= List of films featuring claymation =

Key to the colors used below
	Type of film
C	Clay animated films
H	Films with live action and animation

This is a list of media that showcase claymation, and is divided into three sections: film (both short and feature-length), television (both series and made-for-television films), and music videos. For a list of stop motion films in general, please go here.

== In film ==
	Film	Year	Director(s)	Notes
C	$9.99	2008	Tatia Rosenthal	
C	A Close Shave	1995	Nick Park	The third Wallace & Gromit short film from the franchise.
C	A Grand Day Out	1990	Nick Park	The first Wallace & Gromit short film from the franchise.
C	A Matter of Loaf and Death	2008	Nick Park	The fourth Wallace & Gromit short film from the franchise.
C	A Town Called Panic	2009	Stéphane Aubier, Vincent Patar	
H	A Very Harold & Kumar 3D Christmas	2011	Todd Strauss-Schulson	Laika created the clay animation hallucination segment.
C	Adam	1992	Peter Lord	
C	The Adventures of Mark Twain	1985	Will Vinton	For Fun, Danger, And Excitement!
H	Alice	1988	Jan Švankmajer	
C	The Animated Haggadah	1985	Rony Oren	
C	The Apostle	2012	Fernando Cortizo	
H	Baby Snakes	1979	Frank Zappa	The clay animation sequences were created by Bruce Bickford.
H	Better Off Dead	1985	Savage Steve Holland	The film is a mix between claymation, drawing, and live action. Claymation was by Jimmy Picker.
C	Break!	1985	Garri Bardin	
C	Chicken Run	2000	Peter Lord, Nick Park	A comedy movie about chickens, escaping from a farm that plans to kill the chickens, to make chicken pies.
C	Chicken Run: Dawn of the Nugget	2023	Sam Fell	Sequel to the 2000 film.
C	Clay (or the Origin of Species)	1964	Eli Noyes	
H	Claymation: Three Dimensional Clay Animation	1978	Will Vinton	A documentary film that explores the Will Vinton Studio.
C	Closed Mondays	1974	Will Vinton, Bob Gardiner	
C	Consuming Spirits	2012	Chris Sullivan	
C	Creature Comforts	1989	Nick Park	
C	Early Man	2018	Nick Park	
H	Faust	1994	Jan Švankmajer	
C	Gumbasia	1955	Art Clokey	
C	Gumby: The Movie	1995	Art Clokey	The reference of The 1957 Show.
H	The Happiness of the Katakuris (カタクリ家の幸福, Katakuri-ke no Kōfuku)	2001	Takashi Miike	A surreal horror-comedy that features clay animated sequences.
C	Harvie Krumpet	2003	Adam Elliot	
C	He-Man and She-Bar	1972	Eli Noyes	
C	Hell and Back	2015	Tom Gianas & Ross Shuman	
C	Heungbu-wa Nolbu	1967	Kang Taeung	
C	The House	2022	Emma de Swaef, Marc James Roels, Niki Lindroth von Bahr, Paloma Baeza	Anthology film special comprising three separate stories.
C	John and Michael	2004	Shira Avnni	
C	Jubilee Bunt-a-thon	2012	Nick Park	
C	Last Year's Snow Was Falling	1983	Alexander Tatarsky	
H	The Life Aquatic with Steve Zissou	2004	Wes Anderson	Henry Selick was in charge of the film's clay animation visual effects.
C	Mary and Max	2009	Adam Elliot	
H	Me and Earl and the Dying Girl	2015	Alfonso Gomez-Rejon	The film features sequences that are clay animated.
C	Memoir of a Snail	2024	Adam Elliot	
C	Modeling	1921	Max Fleischer	Part of the animated film series Out of the Inkwell.
H	Monkeybone	2001	Henry Selick	
H	Moonwalker	1988	Jerry Kramer, Colin Chilvers	The film features a clay animation segment by Will Vinton called "Speed Demon".
C	More	1998	Mark Osborne	
C	New Year Song of Ded Moroz	1983	Alexander Tatarsky	
C	The Peanut Vendor	1933	Len Lye	
C	The Pirates! In an Adventure with Scientists!	2012	Peter Lord, Jeff Newitt	
C	Plasticine Crow	1981	Alexander Tatarsky	
C	Plastiphobia	1962	Fred O'Neal, Val Federoff	
C	Pos Eso	2015	Samuel Ortí Martí	
H	Return to Oz	1985	Walter Murch	The Will Vinton Studio created the Nome King sequences; Vinton was nominated for an Oscar.
H	Reveries of a Solitary Walker	2015	Paolo Gaudio	
C	Seryi Volk & Krasnaya Shapochka	1990	Garri Bardin	
C	Shaun the Sheep Movie	2015	Richard Starzak, Mark Burton	
C	A Shaun the Sheep Movie: Farmageddon	2019	Richard Phelan and Will Becher	
H	Sinbad and the Eye of the Tiger	1977	Sam Wanamaker	
C	Stage Fright	1997	Steve Box	
C	Tengers	2007	Michael J. Rix	
C	Tiap-Liap, House Painters	1984	Garri Bardin	
H	Toys in the Attic	2009	Jiří Barta	The film is a mix between claymation, drawing, and live action.
C	Wallace & Gromit: The Curse of the Were-Rabbit	2005	Nick Park, Steve Box	The first Wallace & Gromit feature film from the franchise.
C	Wallace & Gromit: Vengeance Most Fowl	2024	Nick Park, Merlin Crossingham	The second Wallace & Gromit feature film from the franchise.
C	The Wanted 18	2014	Amer Shomali	
C	The Wrong Trousers	1993	Nick Park	The second Wallace & Gromit short film from the franchise.

== In television ==
Show/Series	Year	Creator(s)	Notes
ABC bumpers	1987	Olive Jar Films	
Claymation Christmas Celebration	1987	Will Vinton	
Claymation Easter	1992	Will Vinton	
Arnold Escapes From Church	1988	Craig Bartlett	
Arnold Rides a Chair	1991	Craig Bartlett	
The Arnold Waltz	1990	Craig Bartlett	
Bert and Ernie's Great Adventures	2008	Fransesco Misseri	
Bump in the Night	1994	Danger Productions	
The California Raisin Show	1989	Fred Wolf Films	
Celebrity Deathmatch	1998	Eric Fogel	
Claymation Comedy of Horrors	1989	Will Vinton	
Community	2010	Duke Johnson	Episode: "Abed's Uncontrollable Christmas"
Creation	1980	Will Vinton	
Creature Comforts	1990	Aardman Animations	
Davey and Goliath	1960	Art Clokey, Ruth Clokey, Dick Sutcliffe	
Follow that Goblin	1992	Craig Bartlett	
Gary and Mike	2001	Will Vinton	
Gogs	1993	Deiniol Morris, Michael Mort	
Good Night, Little Ones	1981	Aleksandr Tatarskiy	Animated caption for a TV show under the same name.
The Great Cognito	1982	Will Vinton	
Gumby	1956	Art Clokey	Series consists of The Gumby Show (1956–1968) and Gumby Adventures (1988).
H. P. Lovecraft's The Dunwich Horror and Other Stories	2007	Toei Animation	
I Go Pogo	1979	Stowmar Enterprises	
Inside-Out Boy	1990	Tom Gasek	
Kot v sapogakh	1995	Garri Bardin	
Legacy	1979	Will Vinton	
The Little Prince	1979	Will Vinton	
Mad TV	1995	Corky Quakenbush	Segments: "Raging Rudolph", "The Reinfather", "Clops", "Gumby Old Men" and "A Pack of Gifts Now" (1995–1997)
Martin the Cobbler	1977	Will Vinton	
Meet the Raisins!	1988	Will Vinton, Barry Bruce	
Mio Mao	1974	L+H Films	
Moral Orel	2005	Dino Stamatopoulos	
Morph	1976	Peter Lord, David Sproxton	
Mr. Bill shorts on Saturday Night Live	1976–1981	Walter Williams	
Mr. Go	1996–2006	Argentina	
Oscar and Friends	1995	Cameron Chittock	
Pingu	1986	Otmar Gutmann	
The PJs	1999	Will Vinton	
Plasmo	1996	Anthony Lawrence	
Purple and Brown	2006	Rich Webber	
The Raisins: Sold Out! The California Raisins II	1990	Will Vinton	
The Red and the Blue	1976	L+H Films	
Rex the Runt	1998	Richard Goleszowski	
Rip Van Winkle	1978	Will Vinton	
Robot Chicken	2005	Seth Green, Matthew Senreich	
Shaun the Sheep	2007	Richard Goleszowski, Alison Snowden, David Fine	
Taiko no Tatsujin	2005	Kids Station	
The Trap Door	1984	Terry Brain, Charlie Mills	

== In music videos ==
Song	Year	Musician	Director(s)
"A Christmas Gift"	1980	Paul Stookey	Will Vinton
"Aberdeen"	2011	Cage the Elephant	Isaac Rentz
"All Your Light"	2011	Portugal. The Man	Justin Kramer, Lee Hardcastle
"Astonishing Panorama of the Endtimes"	1999	Marilyn Manson	Pete List
"Bedshaped"	2004	Keane	Corin Hardy
"Bones"	2006	The Killers	Tim Burton
"Darkness"	2013	King Khan and the Shrines	Hylas Film
"The Devil Went Down to Georgia"	1998	Primus	Mike Johnson
"Do for Love"	1998	Tupac Shakur	
"Eazy"	2022	The Game, Kanye West	
"Feels Like We Only Go Backwards"	2012	Tame Impala	Joe Pelling, Becky Sloan
"Innuendo"	1991	Queen	Rudi Dolezal, Hannes Rossacher
"I Stay Away"	1994	Alice in Chains	Nick Donkin
"Jurassic Park"	1993	"Weird Al" Yankovic	Mark Osborne, Scott Nordlund
"Line Up"	1994	Elastica	
"Live for Loving You"	1991	Gloria Estefan	
"Mia"	1999	Chevelle	Jonathan Richter
"Misty"	2011	Kate Bush	
"The Mockingbird & the Crow"	2023	Hardy	Lee Hardcastle
"My Baby Just Cares for Me"	1987	Nina Simone	Peter Lord
"Prison Sex"	1993	Tool	Adam Jones
"Ratamahatta"	1996	Sepultura	Fred Stuhr
"Ready, Able"	2009	Grizzly Bear	Allison Schulnik
"Reet Petite"	1986	Jackie Wilson	Giblets Studio
"Resilient"	2020	Katy Perry	Aya Tanimura
"Rifles Spiral"	2012	The Shins	Jamie Caliri, Alexander Juhasz
"Road to Nowhere"	1985	Talking Heads	Stephen R. Johnson, David Byrne
"Same Ol' Road"	2002	Dredg	American McGee
"Save Me"	2010	Killswitch Engage	Jim Starace
"Sledgehammer"	1986	Peter Gabriel	Stephen R. Johnson
"Snowman"	2020	Sia	Lior Molcho
"Sober"	1993	Tool	Fred Stuhr
"Star Trekkin'"	1987	The Firm	The Film Garage
"Three Little Pigs"	1993	Green Jellÿ	Fred Stuhr
"Underneath the Mistletoe"	2017	Sia	Lior Molcho
"Vanz Kant Danz"	1985	John Fogerty	Will Vinton
"Walkie Talkie Man"	2004	Steriogram	David Kahne
"Weasel Stomping Day"	2006	"Weird Al" Yankovic	The Robot Chicken team
"Speed Demon"	1988	Michael Jackson	Will Vinton
"When It Began"	1991	The Replacements	
"White Winter Hymnal"	2008	Fleet Foxes	Sean Pecknold
