= List of Gumby episodes =

The Gumby Show is an American clay animation television series developed by Art Clokey. In the United States, the first episode of the series originally aired on Howdy Doody in 1955. The series was revived multiple times, with the last episode airing on December 31, 1988. The first season was broadcast on NBC, while the following seasons were made for syndication. A majority of the episodes are available on DVD in multiple regions, as well as via online streaming services.

== Series overview ==
Season	Episodes	Originally released		
Season	Episodes	First released	Last released	Network
Pilots		September 2, 1953; January 29, 1955		NBC
1	43	May 1, 1956	November 9, 1956	NBC
2	87	January 1, 1960	July 9, 1968	Syndication
3	104	January 2, 1988	December 31, 1988	Syndication

== Pilots ==
Art Clokey's first clay animation film was Gumbasia (1953), a short film showcasing a series of clay shapes twisting, turning and contorting in kaleidoscopic patterns. Clokey showed the film to producer Sam Engel, who suggested that Clokey apply the technique to form children's stories. On January 29, 1955, Clokey filmed the first pilot called "Adventures of Gumby", but it never aired. Shortly afterward, Clokey made the second pilot through the financial assistance of Engel, entitled "Gumby on the Moon", which marked Gumby's debut on television. The pilot was then shown on Howdy Doody to much success, and greenlighted development of The Gumby Show.

Title	Directed by	Written by	Original release date
"Gumbasia"	Art Clokey	Art Clokey	September 2, 1953
"Adventures of Gumby: A Sample"	Art Clokey	Art Clokey	January 29, 1955 (Unaired)

== Episodes ==
Since information about the original airdates or original production order is unknown, these listings are reasonable estimates of the original production order. The following was compiled based on the evolution of the voices and appearance of the characters. Most of the 1950s episodes were originally presented as 11-minute stories, but they were split up and presented as separate entries when syndicated along with episodes produced in the 1960s. Several of these abbreviated versions borrow footage from their counterparts, while some had new material filmed specifically for these shorter versions (as evidenced by a brief change in how the characters look in the newer footage). New title sequences were filmed for half of these, while the other half retained the original title sequence. For identification purposes, all 1950s episodes have been listed with the original title of the uncut version followed by any counterparts that were created when these episodes were split up.

=== Season 1 (1956) ===
No. overall	No. in season	Title	Directed by	Written by	Original release date
1 2 3	1 2 3	"Moon Trip"	Art Clokey	Art Clokey	May 1, 1956
After discovering a spaceship in the toy shop, Gumby decides to take a trip to the Moon. Upon arrival, the ship is destroyed by a meteorite, leaving Gumby stranded, and soon a group of elongated pyramid-shaped Moon creatures try to attack him. Meanwhile, his parents spot him through a telescope, prompting his father to go after him with a long fire engine extension ladder. The low temperature of the Moon knocks Gumby out after he alerts his father of his location. His father comes to the rescue and carries Gumby back to Earth. After his mother and father give him medical attention in the hospital, Gumby awakens to full health.
4 5	4 5	"Mirror Land"	Art Clokey	Art Clokey	June 15, 1956
When Gumby loses his coin through one of three mirrors, he begins a search within the virtual images of each. In one of the mirrors, Gumby's reflection assists him. Instructed to do everything backwards in the Mirror Land, Gumby is able to trace the location of his coin. Note: A shortened version of this episode was named "Lost and Found"
6 7	6 7	"The Little Lost Pony"	Art Clokey	Art Clokey	June 22, 1956
A television bulletin warns people to be on the look-out for a lost red pony, with a reward set at 100 ice cream cones. Meanwhile, Gumby goes outside to play and hears a whinny of distress. Rushing to the sound, Gumby finds the pony named Pokey caught on a railroad track and wiggles him free. With hopes of gaining the ice cream cone reward, "G" and "J" Blockhead try to get rid of Gumby and capture Pokey. Notes: Pokey's and the Blockheads' debuts.
8 9	8 9	"The Fantastic Farmer"	Art Clokey	Art Clokey	June 29, 1956
Gumby goes to Farmer Glenn’s Ranch to help Pokey. His crops are not growing properly, so Gumby helps in every way he can and finally divides himself into a lot of Gumbys, which go over the fields with many different farm machines. It turns out that the wild growth of the crops is the result of a gopher who In order to feed his large, hungry family, injects roots of corn plants with a chemical that makes them grow into giant ears and roots. Gumby solves the problem by inventing a root machine that makes tasty roots out of weeds.
10 11	10 11	"The Black Knight"	Art Clokey	Art Clokey	July 6, 1956
Gumby plays with a giant electromagnet on a crane in the toy store, which accidentally strips the armor off of a knight who was passing by. As they sort the mess out, Gumby learns that the knight is looking for someone who can fight fires. Gumby decides to borrow a toy fire engine, and he and the knight arrive at the kingdom, where Gumby learns of the kingdom's food shortage due to several fires, and finds the cause of the fire shortly afterwards: A dragon. Gumby puts out the fires, berates the dragon for its actions, and finds out about the Black Knight, who has placed a spell on the dragon causing the burning of the wheat. Gumby confronts the Black Knight, who challenges Gumby to a duel in exchange for the removal of the spell from the dragon. During the duel, Gumby slips out of his armor and uses it as a decoy to divert the knight's attention. The bad news is, now he doesn't have any armor. The dragon comes back, and seeing the trouble Gumby's in, helps out by spewing flames at the Black Knight. This gives Gumby the opportunity to retrieve the electromagnet, using it to strip the Black Knight's armor off, much to the delight of the audience and the king. After the duel is finished, Gumby and the good knight ride into the castle on the dragon. Gumby is knighted and the dragon becomes the king's pet. Note: A shortened version of this episode was named "Mysterious Fires"
12 13	12 13	"Too Loo"	Art Clokey	Art Clokey	July 13, 1956
Too and Loo are music notes who escape from a cracked record. After Gumby woke up from his nap, he got up to turn off the record player. Two giant sentient notes jump out of it and hide in his mouth from the sour note, which also jumps out of it. When the sour note flies away on the record, the notes, Too and Loo, come out of Gumby's mouth and explain that they want to go home to the instrument they came from. Gumby agrees to take them to Music Land and help them find their home. Unfortunately, they forgot what instrument played them, so Gumby has to try them all, and they go into crying fits with every mistake. Gumby decides to put on a show to cheer them up. Meanwhile, the sour note has found their hiding place and he's using his little flying record to try and catch them. While the real notes hide, Gumby turns himself into Too and Loo. The sour note catches him, but then he turns back and catches the note. The note tells Too and Loo that they came from the flute. Note: This episode was split into two parts (the second and final part as "Gumby Concerto" only) that were released into the public domain.
14 15	14 15	"Robot Rumpus"	Art Clokey	Art Clokey	July 20, 1956
Gumby uses toy robots to do his household chores on Saturdays, but they go haywire. Notes: The second part only was released into the public domain and appeared in the Mystery Science Theater 3000 episode "The Screaming Skull". Alternate title of edit is "Yard Work Made Easy"
16 17	16 17	"Toy Crazy"	Art Clokey	Art Clokey	July 27, 1956
It is Gumby’s birthday and he is permitted to choose his own present from the toy store! Note: This episode was edited into the unofficial Christmas segment without the title card.
18 19	18 19	"Lion Around"	Art Clokey	Art Clokey	August 10, 1956
A lion escapes from the zoo, frightening Gumby and Pokey who have been playing in the park. The lion proves to be friendly and asks Gumby and Pokey to show him how to go about seeing the world. Meanwhile, the zookeeper sets a lion trap to recapture the lion but instead succeeds in capturing Gumby’s father. Richard the lion sets out to see the world in a fast sports car, taking Gumby and Pokey with him. A wild and frightening ride through the streets of the city gets even scarier when they become airborne. Richard wisely decides that life outside the zoo is too much for him.
20 21	20 21	"The Eggs and Trixie"	Art Clokey	Art Clokey	August 17, 1956
Gumby has a daydream adventure with a young dinosaur named Trixie. The pre-historic adventure provides an authentic view of these times. Gumby has an exciting adventure in Dinosaurland. Volcanoes erupting, an earthquake and a dinosaur stampede all cause Gumby trouble before his adventure is over.
22 23	22 23	"Odd Balls"	Art Clokey	Art Clokey	August 24, 1956
Gumby reads a story about two soft marbles that can't hold their shape, and goes on a mission to find which sound will make them round normal marbles again. Note: A shortened version of this episode was named "Outcast Marbles"
24 25	24 25	"Gumby Business"	Art Clokey	Art Clokey	August 31, 1956
Notes: This is the first episode without dialogue. A short version of this episode is called "Toy Fun"
26 27	26 27	"The Mocking Monkey"	Art Clokey	Art Clokey	September 7, 1956
28 29	28 29	"The Magic Show"	Art Clokey	Art Clokey	September 14, 1956
Gumby and Pokey are working at a lemonade stand, where they get a magician as their first customer. When the magician leaves his magic wand behind by accident, Gumby opts to return it to him after it breaks his mom's favorite pitcher. He is then whisked away to a surrealistic world known as "Magic Land", where he must traverse its ever-changing landscape, while fending off a pair of guardians named Red and Whitey, who have been tasked with upholding vague orders that hinder Gumby's efforts. Note: A shortened version of this episode was named "The Magic Wand"
30 31	30 31	"Pokey Express"	Art Clokey	Art Clokey	September 21, 1956
32 33	32 33	"The Racing Game"	Art Clokey	Art Clokey	September 28, 1956
Note: A short version of this episode is called "Gumby Racer"
34 35	34 35	"Rain Spirits"	Art Clokey	Art Clokey	October 5, 1956
Gumby and Pokey are playing in a toy swimming pool when a Hopi boy appears. He asks for their help in summoning the rain spirits because his tribe is in danger of starvation due to a lack of rain. Gumby and Pokey agree to help him, first by returning to the book he came from and then communicating to the spirits for their help. After planting the seeds for the crops, the three witness the spirits in the sky and make it rain.
36 37	36 37	"Toying Around"	Art Clokey	Art Clokey	October 12, 1956
38 39	38 39	"In the Dough"	Art Clokey	Art Clokey	October 19, 1956
Note: A portion of the episode is seen in The Yummy Awards Saturday Morning NBC 1983 preview special.
40 41	40 41	"Tree Trouble"	Art Clokey	Art Clokey	October 26, 1956
Note: This is the first episode to have the frozen title card.
42	42	"Train Trouble"	Art Clokey	Art Clokey	November 2, 1956
Gumby wins a sentient toy train in a contest, but has trouble collecting his prize when the train keeps trying to get away from him.
43	43	"In a Fix"	Art Clokey	Art Clokey	November 9, 1956

=== Syndicated revival (1960–68) ===
No. overall	No. in season	Title	Directed by	Written by	Original release date
44	1	"The Zoops"	Art Clokey	Art Clokey	January 1, 1960
Gumby, who has been selling watermelons to raise money to buy his mother a birthday present, is given a magic potion by a wizard which transforms watermelons into colorful creatures called "Zoops", which move about randomly. Seeing the chance for a fast buck, Gumby sells them to the zoo, then celebrates at an automat. When Pokey says they should only spend the money on the present, Gumby says to lighten up and live a little. Meanwhile at the zoo, when the Zoops are out of control, the zookeeper hoses them with water, causing them to revert to watermelons. Gumby, who already spent half the money celebrating, is made to work it off cleaning cages. Pokey is sorry Gumby's mother will not be getting a present, and when Gumby suggests another moneymaker, Pokey replies "No, Gumby, I have had enough of your ideas".
45	2	"Even Steven"	Art Clokey	Art Clokey	January 3, 1960
46	3	"The Glob"	Art Clokey	Art Clokey	January 15, 1960
Gumby and Pokey share ice cream cones in an art room, and a block of modelling clay chases after them. Note: A clip of this episode appears in Gumby: The Movie.
47	4	"Chicken Feed"	Art Clokey	Art Clokey	January 22, 1960
Gumby uses "Super Gro" chicken feed, which causes his pet hen Tilly to become monstrous and lay gigantic eggs everywhere. The veterinarian comes to the rescue. Note: Tilly's first and only prototypical appearance.
48	5	"Hidden Valley"	Art Clokey	Art Clokey	February 2, 1960
49	6	"The Groobee"	Art Clokey	Art Clokey	February 18, 1960
50	7	"The Witty Witch"	Art Clokey	Art Clokey	February 20, 1960
51	8	"Hot Rod Granny"	Art Clokey	Art Clokey	February 24, 1960
Gumby is taking his hot rod for a spin downtown, at the same time when Granny (his own grandmother) broke her glasses and mistakes the hot rod for her car and Pokey, who is still inside, for her dog Hepzibah. Due to her blurred vision, Granny risks all sorts of accidents, which she blames on "young reckless speedmonsters" and is happy to hear police sirens, only to realize a motorcycle policeman is on the lookout for Gumby's stolen car. Note: Granny's debut, and this is the first day in the limelight episode.
52	9	"Ricochet Pete"	Art Clokey	Art Clokey	February 28, 1960
Gumby, who is working as the Sheriff of Silver City, is challenged by the gun-crazy outlaw, "Ricochet Pete", to a duel at Last Chance Canyon. Although Gumby initially blows him off, he agrees to the duel when Pete agrees to leave town if Gumby can scare him. Working together with Pokey, the duo manage to get one over on Pete. Rather than leave town though, Gumby and Pete manage to work out a different agreement instead.
53	10	"Northland Follies"	Art Clokey	Art Clokey	March 1, 1960
54	11	"The Small Planets"	Art Clokey	Art Clokey	March 12, 1960
Gumby has had enough of parental rule and encourages Pokey to come with him into outer space to find their own planet, despite Pokey's reluctance to leave Earth. They then find three planets all populated by kids who ran away from home.
55	12	"Sad King Ott's Daughter"	Art Clokey	Art Clokey	March 19, 1960
Note: Sad King Ott and his daughter's debut, and a clip of the re-recorded episode is heard in Gumby: The Movie.
56	13	"King for a Day"	Art Clokey	Art Clokey	March 25, 1960
King Ott is challenged to a joust by the Black Knight for ownership of his kingdom. With the King being too old to accept the challenge, Gumby volunteers to fight in his place.
57	14	"Rain for Roo"	Art Clokey	Art Clokey	April 3, 1960
58	15	"Santa-Witch"	Art Clokey	Art Clokey	December 3, 1960
When Santa Claus gets sick, Pokey calls up the witch to fly the sleigh and deliver children their Christmas presents. Note: This is the first episode where Gumby is mentioned.
59	16	"Scrooge Loose"	Art Clokey	Art Clokey	December 10, 1960
60	17	"Pigeon in a Plum Tree"	Art Clokey	Art Clokey	December 17, 1960
61	18	"Dragon Witch"	Art Clokey	Art Clokey	May 1, 1963
Note: Billed as "A Gumby Special", the episode doesn't feature Gumby.
62	19	"Treasure for Henry"	Art Clokey	Art Clokey	May 15, 1963
Note: Billed as "A Gumby Special", the episode doesn't feature Gumby.
63	20	"Who's What"	Art Clokey	Art Clokey	May 22, 1963
Note: Billed as "A Gumby Special", the episode doesn't feature Gumby.
N–A	N–A	"The Space Ball"	Art Clokey	Art Clokey	June 2, 1963
Professor Kapp, in his first appearance, has invented a ball-shaped ship that travels out of his control with a passenger on board. Note: This special is not counted among the 234 episodes. It also does not feature Gumby. This is the first day in the limelight short, and a clip of this short appears in the Gumby episode, "Minga-Sitting".
64	21	"The Reluctant Gargoyles"	Art Clokey	Art Clokey	June 9, 1964
Note: This is the first episode where Gumby is absent. This is also Prickle's and Goo's debut.
65	22	"Tricky Train"	Art Clokey	Art Clokey	June 18, 1964
Note: Nopey's debut.
66	23	"Siege of Boonesborough"	Art Clokey	Art Clokey	June 19, 1964
67	24	"The Missile-Bird"	Art Clokey	Art Clokey	June 23, 1964
Note: This is the first lower-deck episode.
68	25	"Good Knight Story"	Art Clokey	Art Clokey	June 24, 1964
69	26	"The Blue Goo"	Art Clokey	Art Clokey	July 9, 1964
Gumby and Prickle, who are World War One aviators, attempt to put an end to the Black Baron. Goo has her way of helping the heroes. While fighting the Black Baron in his tri-plane, Gumby crashes. Pokey and Prickle vow to carry on the fight for Gumby. Goo is ordered to remain on the ground because she is a girl – but Goo has her own ideas about that – and it is through her efforts that the mission is carried out successfully.
70	27	"A Hair-Raising Adventure"	Art Clokey	Art Clokey	July 10, 1964
71	28	"Goo for Pokey"	Art Clokey	Art Clokey	July 31, 1964
72	29	"Candidate for President"	Art Clokey	Art Clokey	August 2, 1965
Gumby is elected to run for President of the United States (despite his disinterest in the campaign.) To help their friend, Prickle and Goo set off to get some advice from other presidents who ran for office.
73	30	"G.F.D. (Gumby's Fire Department)"	Art Clokey	Art Clokey	August 15, 1965
An experiment causes a fire in Professor Kapp's laboratory. The Gumby Fire Department rushes to save Kapp, only for Gumby, Pokey and Prickle to realize they lost their jump net and other equipment. Goo saves the day by making herself into a net to save Kapp, then uses her clay to snuff the fire.
74	31	"Making Squares"	Art Clokey	Art Clokey	August 22, 1965
75	32	"The Golden Iguana"	Art Clokey	Art Clokey	September 14, 1965
Prickle wins a national pet contest and is awarded a prize golden iguana. The professor mixes a special formula for its food but there is one wrong ingredient. This causes the iguana to double its size. The blockheads decide to take the iguana but Gumby again manages to foil them. Before things are over though, the iguana gives them all a shock.
76	33	"School for Squares"	Art Clokey	Art Clokey	September 18, 1965
Gumby receives a distress signal from the Pesky Indian Reserve. The chief says the Blockheads have kidnapped the Indian children and forced them into their school, which is actually an indoctrination center transforming them into Blockhead children.
77	34	"The Magic Flute"	Art Clokey	Art Clokey	September 21, 1965
78	35	"The Ferris-Wheel Mystery"	Art Clokey	Art Clokey	September 30, 1965
79	36	"Mason Hornet"	Art Clokey	Art Clokey	October 1, 1966
80	37	"Prickle's Problem"	Art Clokey	Art Clokey	October 2, 1966
"Prickle feels that he goes unnoticed and that his life lacks excitement. While eating ice cream with Gumby, Pokey and Goo, Prickle notices a baby about to be hit by a car. He saves the child and becomes famous – but his fame turns out to be a curse, as the evil Doctor Zveegee decides he wants to capture Prickle to add to his collection."
81	38	"The Golden Gosling"	Art Clokey	Art Clokey	October 14, 1966
82	39	"A Groobee Fight"	Art Clokey	Art Clokey	October 18, 1966
83	40	"The Gumby League"	Art Clokey	Art Clokey	October 31, 1966
Gumby's baseball team plays the Blockheads.
84	41	"Pilgrims on the Rocks"	Art Clokey	Art Clokey	November 1, 1966
85	42	"Pokey's Price"	Art Clokey	Art Clokey	November 2, 1966
86	43	"Son of Liberty"	Art Clokey	Art Clokey	November 15, 1966
Gumby and Pokey wind up getting involved with the American Revolutionary War. When the british empire mistake them for spies, the duo must find a way around their stronghold to inform Paul Revere of an ambush they have planned for the american colonists.
87	44	"Gumby Crosses the Delaware"	Art Clokey	Art Clokey	November 18, 1966
88	45	"Of Clay and Critters"	Art Clokey	Art Clokey	November 19, 1967
89	46	"Tricky Ball"	Art Clokey	Art Clokey	November 22, 1967
90	47	"Dragon Daffy"	Art Clokey	Art Clokey	November 25, 1967
Prickle is denied entry from an Ice Cream Parlor for being mistaken for a Dragon. Despite defending that he is a Dinosaur, he seeks help from Gumby and his own mother to prove otherwise.
91	48	"Super-Spray"	Art Clokey	Art Clokey	November 29, 1967
92	49	"The Big Eye"	Art Clokey	Art Clokey	December 1, 1967
93	50	"Lawn Party"	Art Clokey	Art Clokey	December 8, 1967
Note: Contains partial live action.
94	51	"Mystic Magic"	Art Clokey	Art Clokey	December 15, 1967
95	52	"Puppy Dog School"	Art Clokey	Art Clokey	December 22, 1967
Note: First time Nopey says "no" repeatedly.
96	53	"Puppy Talk"	Art Clokey	Art Clokey	December 23, 1967
97	54	"Moon Madness"	Art Clokey	Art Clokey	December 24, 1967
While digging for fossils, Gumby learns that Pokey and Prickle are being chased by a pair of robotic legs. He dismisses them by pointing out that the moon is full, and it's causing them to act funny, but Goo proves otherwise.
98	55	"Shady Lemonade"	Art Clokey	Art Clokey	December 25, 1967
99	56	"Prickle Turns Artist"	Art Clokey	Art Clokey	December 26, 1967
100	57	"Piano Rolling Blues"	Art Clokey	Art Clokey	December 27, 1967
The evil scientist, Doctor Zveegee, who lives next to a pianist, attempts to get rid of his neighbor's piano by hiring the Gumby Piano Moving Company, claiming himself to be the pianist who is no good. Gumby attempts all sorts of ways to get rid of the piano until the mad scientist sees Prickle is one of Gumby's employees, then attempts to capture a living dinosaur.
101	58	"Hot Ice"	Art Clokey	Art Clokey	December 28, 1967
102	59	"Haunted Hot Dog"	Art Clokey	Art Clokey	December 29, 1967
103	60	"The Moon Boggles"	Art Clokey	Art Clokey	December 30, 1967
104	61	"Do-It-Yourself Gumby"	Art Clokey	Art Clokey	December 31, 1967
Gumby invites a machine that can create anything he types into it.
105	62	"Behind the Puff Ball"	Art Clokey	Art Clokey	January 1, 1968
Pokey and Prickle are playing polo until something went wrong with Prickle's ball.
106	63	"Weight and See"	Art Clokey	Art Clokey	January 3, 1968
Gumby and his gang tries out a fortune-telling weight machine.
107	64	"Pokey Minds the Baby"	Art Clokey	Art Clokey	January 15, 1968
108	65	"A Lovely Bunch of Coconuts"	Art Clokey	Art Clokey	January 22, 1968
Gumby fails to grow coconuts and buys a fertilizer, which has its own successful results.
109	66	"Grub Grabber Gumby"	Art Clokey	Art Clokey	February 1, 1968
Gumby's over-eating habitat lead him to a nightmare.
110	67	"All Broken Up"	Art Clokey	Art Clokey	February 20, 1968
111	68	"This Little Piggy"	Art Clokey	Art Clokey	February 26, 1968
112	69	"Wishful Thinking"	Art Clokey	Art Clokey	February 29, 1968
Prickle makes a wish on his birthday, but when his obsession with the wish makes him refuse to come out of his house, Gumby, Pokey, and Goo must try to find a way in.
113	70	"Turnip Trap"	Art Clokey	Art Clokey	March 12, 1968
Prickle remembers what it was that he wished for, but he needs Gumby, Pokey, and Goo's help to build a Corn Crib first. Note: Part two of Wishful Thinking.
114	71	"The Rodeo King"	Art Clokey	Art Clokey	March 17, 1968
115	72	"Gumby Babysits"	Art Clokey	Art Clokey	March 22, 1968
116	73	"El Toro"	Art Clokey	Art Clokey	March 28, 1968
117	74	"Dopey Nopey"	Art Clokey	Art Clokey	April 3, 1968
118	75	"Gold Rush Gumby"	Art Clokey	Art Clokey	April 15, 1968
Gumby, Pokey, and Nopey all go digging for gold in the Pesky Indian Reserve, but their search is interrupted by the natives, who have a problem that only Gumby might be able to solve.
119	76	"Dog Catchers"	Art Clokey	Art Clokey	April 22, 1968
120	77	"Stuck on Books"	Art Clokey	Art Clokey	April 30, 1968
Gumby and Pokey are wanting to go on an adventure, but Nopey stubbornly refuses to enter the book they want to go in.
121	78	"Bully For Gumby"	Art Clokey	Art Clokey	May 1, 1968
122	79	"A Bone for Nopey"	Art Clokey	Art Clokey	May 15, 1968
Note: Final time Nopey is voiced by Dal McKennon.
123	80	"Gabby Auntie"	Art Clokey	Art Clokey	May 22, 1968
124	81	"Foxy Box"	Art Clokey	Art Clokey	May 31, 1968
125	82	"Indian Country"	Art Clokey	Art Clokey	June 9, 1968
126	83	"Tail Tale"	Art Clokey	Art Clokey	June 18, 1968
127	84	"Motor Mania"	Art Clokey	Art Clokey	June 19, 1968
Gumby and Pokey go go-kart racing to win a $500 prize if they can beat the race's champion: Reggie Von Snoot.
128	85	"Sticky Pokey"	Art Clokey	Art Clokey	June 23, 1968
After being chased by the Blockheads one time too many, Pokey seeks help from Gumby, Prickle, and Professor Kapp, who come up with a very sticky solution.
129	86	"Point of Honor"	Art Clokey	Art Clokey	June 24, 1968
Gumby and Prickle face one another in a duel after Prickle rudely upstages Gumby in front of Goo.
130	87	"The Indian Challenge"	Art Clokey	Art Clokey	July 9, 1968

=== Gumby Adventures (1988) ===
The show was revived in 1988 as Gumby Adventures with 99 new episodes and five shorts ("Gone Clayzy", "Gumball Gumby", "Chatter Box", "Clay Trix", and "The Funny Bathtub"). The shorts, as well as the re-recorded editions of The Gumby Show, were included with the revival's syndication.

No. overall	No. in season	Title	Directed by	Written by	Original release date
131	1	"Mirror-Aculous Recovery"	Art Clokey	Art Clokey	January 9, 1988
132	2	"As the Worm Turns"	Art Clokey	Art Clokey	January 9, 1988
133	3	"Lost Treasure"	Art Clokey	Art Clokey	January 16, 1988
134	4	"The Beetle and the Caterpillar"	Art Clokey	Art Clokey	January 16, 1988
135	5	"Gumbot"	Art Clokey	Art Clokey	January 23, 1988
136	6	"Guitar Magic"	Art Clokey	Art Clokey	January 23, 1988
137	7	"A Miner Affair"	Art Clokey	Art Clokey	January 30, 1988
138	8	"All Cooped Up"	Art Clokey	Art Clokey	January 30, 1988
Note: Tilly's first official appearance ever produced.
139	9	"Wild Girls"	Art Clokey	Art Clokey	January 9, 1988
140	10	"A Smashing Hit"	Art Clokey	Art Clokey	January 16, 1988
141	11	"Music Ball"	Art Clokey	Art Clokey	January 2, 1988
A top-secret package is accidentally airdropped into the barn. Its contents are revealed to be a shapeshifting gold ball that reacts to the sound of Gumby and his friends' music. When they consider using it for their next concert, it is stolen by the Blockheads. Note: Tilly's first official appearance ever aired.
142	12	"The Elephant and the Dragon"	Art Clokey	Art Clokey	February 6, 1988
Note: A clip of this episode appeared in Gumby episode, "Geese Grief".
143	13	"Birthday Party in the Middle Ages"	Art Clokey	Art Clokey	February 13, 1988
Note: Final appearances of Nopey and others in this episode, but they moved to the re-recorded episodes.
144	14	"Strange Circus Animals"	Art Clokey	Art Clokey	April 2, 1988
Gumby and his friends opt to run their own circus to support a local missing children charity. While searching for animals to use in their show, Gumby and Pokey befriend an orphaned baby mastodon named Denali, after witnessing its mother's death. Note: Denali's debut.
145	15	"The Fliver 500"	Art Clokey	Art Clokey	February 27, 1988
146	16	"A Gumby Day"	Art Clokey	Art Clokey	April 2, 1988
An average day in the life of the Gumby household is seen as Gumby prepares to start the day. After which, he (and Pokey) visit the farm to practice their circus routine with Denali. Note: Minga's debut.
147	17	"The Search"	Art Clokey	Art Clokey	March 12, 1988
148	18	"Gumby's Circus"	Art Clokey	Art Clokey	January 30, 1988
149	19	"Melon Felons"	Art Clokey	Art Clokey	March 5, 1988
Gumby uses a chemical solution to grow watermelons and sell them, and Denali sprays the solution on the ground; after selling the watermelons that the Blockheads stole, the chemical combined with Denali's ice power causes the watermelons to grow into gigantic, sentient monsters that rampage the town and chase Gumby and his friends.
150	20	"Shrink-a-Dink"	Art Clokey	Art Clokey	January 2, 1988
151	21	"The Big City"	Art Clokey	Art Clokey	February 13, 1988
152	22	"Cottage for Granny"	Art Clokey	Art Clokey	April 2, 1988
While visiting the barn, Granny's glasses are broken by accident, leading to chaos on the road. When Gumby and Goo visit to check on her, they learn that she had been swindled by the Blockheads pretending to be real-estate agents due her poor eyesight.
153	23	"The Big Squirt"	Art Clokey	Art Clokey	March 19, 1988
154	24	"Witch Way"	Art Clokey	Art Clokey	March 26, 1988
Note: The first time Minga has red lips.
155	25	"The Astrobots"	Art Clokey	Art Clokey	May 14, 1988
156	26	"Educational TV"	Art Clokey	Art Clokey	March 12, 1988
Note: The final time Minga has her yellow dress.
157	27	"Denali's House"	Art Clokey	Art Clokey	February 6, 1988
158	28	"Humbug!!"	Art Clokey	Art Clokey	February 20, 1988
159	29	"Dolly for Minga"	Art Clokey	Art Clokey	August 20, 1988
160	30	"The Wind Bag"	Art Clokey	Art Clokey	April 9, 1988
161	31	"Little Girl Lost"	Art Clokey	Art Clokey	March 19, 1988
Note: The first time Minga has her yellow buttons.
162	32	"Children for Sale"	Art Clokey	Art Clokey	March 26, 1988
Note: This is the first episode where Minga does not speak, and a clip from the episode appears during the end credits of Gumby: The Movie.
163	33	"A Lotta Hot Air"	Art Clokey	Art Clokey	April 9, 1988
164	34	"The Wild Horse"	Art Clokey	Art Clokey	April 9, 1988
Note: The final time Minga has red lips.
165	35	"Of Note"	Art Clokey	Art Clokey	February 13, 1988
166	36	"Fun Day"	Art Clokey	Art Clokey	February 20, 1988
Note: A clip from the episode appears during the end credits of Gumby: The Movie.
167	37	"The Plant"	Art Clokey	Art Clokey	April 16, 1988
168	38	"Merry-Go-Pumpkin"	Art Clokey	Art Clokey	March 5, 1988
It's Minga's birthday and Gumby takes her, along with their friends, to a pumpkin-themed amusement park.
169	39	"Minga-Sitting"	Art Clokey	Art Clokey	February 27, 1988
170	40	"A Real Seal"	Art Clokey	Art Clokey	February 27, 1988
171	41	"Naughty Boy"	Art Clokey	Art Clokey	April 16, 1988
A boy named Thomas Pitts plays truant from school, so Gumby volunteers to get him back.
172	42	"Hatching Out"	Art Clokey	Art Clokey	January 2, 1988
After watching a dinosaur documentary, Gumby has a nightmare about being chased and eaten by a Tyrannosaurus Rex. Note: A clip from the episode appears during the end credits of Gumby: The Movie.
173	43	"Time Kapp-Sule"	Art Clokey	Art Clokey	March 5, 1988
174	44	"Band Contest"	Art Clokey	Art Clokey	March 12, 1988
175	45	"Geese Grief"	Art Clokey	Art Clokey	May 21, 1988
After an accident that happened at the park, Minga and Prickle are turned into geese by an evil sorcerer. After finding out what happened, Gumby takes them to see King Ott's personal wizard for a cure.
176	46	"The Fox Hunt"	Art Clokey	Art Clokey	May 21, 1988
A fox attempts to eat Tilly, so Gumby and his friends set out to teach the fox a lesson.
177	47	"The Lost Arrow"	Art Clokey	Art Clokey	August 20, 1988
178	48	"Command Performance"	Art Clokey	Art Clokey	March 19, 1988
179	49	"Sleepy Time Robbers"	Art Clokey	Art Clokey	March 26, 1988
180	50	"Balloonacy"	Art Clokey	Art Clokey	April 23, 1988
181	51	"Picnic"	Art Clokey	Art Clokey	April 23, 1988
182	52	"Wild Train Ride"	Art Clokey	Art Clokey	May 7, 1988
183	53	"Funtasia"	Art Clokey	Rich Zim, Tom Gasek, Stephen Buckley, Mark Peter Maggiore, Mike Belzer & Anthony Scott	April 30, 1988
Note: This is the first episode with credits.
184	54	"Rip Van Prickle"	Art Clokey	Art Clokey	April 30, 1988
Prickle has a nightmare that he's an old dinosaur in the future and none of his friends recognize him.
185	55	"The Great Mastodon Robbery"	Art Clokey	Art Clokey	April 30, 1988
186	56	"Young Granny"	Art Clokey	Art Clokey	April 16, 1988
187	57	"The Abominable Dough Man"	Art Clokey	Art Clokey	May 14, 1988
Minga offers to make bread; while waiting for it to bake, she takes a nap and has a bad dream in which the bread dough gets out of control and turns into a monster that wreaks havoc.
188	58	"Ostrich Feathers"	Art Clokey	Art Clokey	February 6, 1988
189	59	"Blocks in the Head"	Art Clokey	Art Clokey	May 14, 1988
Gumby studies for an exam about cubes and ends up seeing people and his friends having blocks for heads.
190	60	"Gumby's Close Encounter"	Art Clokey	Art Clokey	May 28, 1988
191	61	"Arctic Antics"	Art Clokey	Art Clokey	May 7, 1988
192	62	"Runaway Camel"	Art Clokey	Art Clokey	May 7, 1988
193	63	"Flying Carpets"	Art Clokey	Art Clokey	May 28, 1988
194	64	"Gumbitty Doo-Dah"	Art Clokey	Kristine Albrecht, Kurt Hanson, Tim Hittle, Eric Leighton & Mark Peter Maggiore	January 23, 1988
195	65	"G.M.V. (Gumby Music Video)"	Art Clokey	Art Clokey	August 13, 1988
Gumby and his friends make a music video. Note: A clip from the episode appears during the end credits of Gumby: The Movie.
196	66	"Lost in Chinatown"	Art Clokey	Art Clokey	June 25, 1988
197	67	"Joker's Wild"	Art Clokey	Art Clokey	June 25, 1988
A joker is banished from his card deck for not being funny, so he seeks Gumby's help to be funny and make the card king laugh.
198	68	"Minga's Folly"	Art Clokey	Art Clokey	June 4, 1988
Note: This is the first episode with music selections from previous Gumby episodes by Jerry Gerber.
199	69	"High as a Kite"	Art Clokey	Art Clokey	June 4, 1988
200	70	"The Denali Blues"	Art Clokey	Art Clokey	February 20, 1988
201	71	"Gumbastic"	Art Clokey	Anthony Scott, Kurt Hanson, Angie Glocka & Owen Klatte	April 23, 1988
202	72	"Little Denali Lost"	Art Clokey	Art Clokey	June 18, 1988
Note: Part two of The Denali Blues.
203	73	"Goo and the Queen"	Art Clokey	Art Clokey	June 11, 1988
204	74	"Goo and the Queen"	Art Clokey	Art Clokey	June 11, 1988
Note: This is the final episode where Gumby is mentioned.
205	75	"A Moving Experience"	Art Clokey	Art Clokey	May 28, 1988
206	76	"Prickle's Baby Brudder"	Art Clokey	David Bleiman	June 11, 1988
Prickle's "little" brother, a gigantic fire-breathing dragon, is being hunted by a knight after a series of unexplained fires damage a village; Prickle and Gumby help out to clear the dragon of any guilt and discover the cause of the mysterious fires.
207	77	"My O Maya"	Art Clokey	Art Clokey	July 2, 1988
208	78	"Goo's Music Video"	Art Clokey	Art Clokey	July 23, 1988
Goo suffers from Writer's Block while trying to come up with ideas for a music video with Gumby and the others. She soon find inspiration after having a vivid dream about being chased by a bear in a cave. Note: A clip from the episode appears during the end credits of Gumby: The Movie.
209	79	"Clayfully Yours"	Art Clokey	Stephen Buckley, Karen Kiser and Rich Zim	August 13, 1988
Note: This is the final episode to have the only character who speaks.
210	80	"Proxy Gumby"	Art Clokey	Art Clokey	June 4, 1988
211	81	"Goo's Pies"	Art Clokey	Art Clokey	May 21, 1988
Goo is baking pies that everyone loves and gets robots to make the work easier; however, the Blockheads seek out to ruin her business so people can by their pies.
212	82	"Robot Farm"	Art Clokey	Art Clokey	July 9, 1988
213	83	"The Forbidden Mine"	Art Clokey	Art Clokey	July 9, 1988
214	84	"The Forbidden Mine"	Art Clokey	Art Clokey	July 9, 1988
215	85	"Clay Play"	Art Clokey	Blake Martin, Tony Laudati & Stephen C. Wathen	June 18, 1988
Note: This is the final episode without dialogue, and a clip of this episode appeared in Freddy's Nightmares episode, "The End of the World".
216	86	"The Knight Mare"	Art Clokey	Art Clokey	June 25, 1988
217	87	"Skateboard Rally"	Art Clokey	Art Clokey	July 23, 1988
Gumby takes part in a skateboard exhibition. Before he can partake however, his board is stolen by the Blockheads.
218	88	"Space Oddity"	Art Clokey	Art Clokey	July 16, 1988
219	89	"Space Oddity"	Art Clokey	Art Clokey	July 16, 1988
220	90	"Best in the Block"	Art Clokey	Art Clokey	July 23, 1988
Gumby's cousins are house-hunting, but the only house that's available is too expensive, and being built by the Blockheads. Gumby tries to help out by having the Groobee build several houses for a more affordable price, but the Blockheads try to sabotage them by spiking the Groobee's sawdust.
221	91	"The Lost Birthday Present"	Art Clokey	Art Clokey	July 30, 1988
The Blockheads are accused of stealing Gumby's birthday present (a piano).
222	92	"2 Bee or Knot 2 Bee"	Art Clokey	Art Clokey	July 16, 1988
Note: This is the only episode to have the rebus title.
223	93	"Just Train Crazy"	Art Clokey	Art Clokey	July 30, 1988
224	94	"Wickiups and Bulrushes"	Art Clokey	Art Clokey	July 30, 1988
225	95	"Pokey à la Mode"	Art Clokey	Gloria Clokey	July 2, 1988
Note: This is the final episode where Gumby is absent, and also the final day in the limelight episode, and the only episode to have two characters who speak at the end.
226	96	"Kangaroo Express"	Art Clokey	Art Clokey	August 6, 1988
227	97	"Kid Brother Kids"	Art Clokey	Art Clokey	August 6, 1988
Gumby and his friends are invited to perform a concert at an ice cream-serving saloon, where they are interrupted by two notorious Blockheads referred to as the Kid Brothers and a food fight breaks out. Note: The only appearances of the 1-2 Blockheads.
228	98	"Time Out"	Art Clokey	Ken Pontac	August 13, 1988
229	99	"For the Graduate"	Art Clokey	Art Clokey	August 6, 1988
The final Gumby classic episode, and final lower-deck episode.
230	100	"Gone Clayzy"	Art Clokey	David Bleiman	June 18, 1988
A piece of Gumby's head comes off after he suffers from a nasty fall, rendering him brain-dead. When Prickle tries to place it back on, it gains a chaotic mind of its own.
231	101	"Gumball Gumby"	Art Clokey	Gloria Clokey	July 2, 1988
Gumby tries to get a gumball from a gumball machine, despite having no cash. When he gets stuck inside it, Pokey comes to his rescue.
232	102	"Clay Trix"	Art Clokey	Art Clokey	August 20, 1988
Note: This is the last time Gumby, Pokey, Prickle, and Goo appear together, and the only mime-and-music only short.
233	103	"Chatter Box"	Art Clokey	Gloria Clokey	December 31, 1988
Note: This is the last frozen title card and last episode with credits.
234	104	"The Funny Bathtub"	Art Clokey	Art Clokey	December 31, 1988
Note: Last Gumby classic short, and the sixth and last time to feature live action footage, and second and final day in the limelight short, and final Gumby episode with music selections from previous Gumby episodes by Jerry Gerber. The re-recorded editions of 1955-1969 Gumby episodes with music selections from them by him are aired in the late 1980s.

== Bumpers ==
1. Pokey shoots Gumby out of a cannon.
2. Pokey rolls a giant green ball of clay off the cliff and it becomes nine mini Gumbys.
3. Gumby inflates a balloon, but gets inflated into a bigger and fatter version with Pokey by his side.
4. Pokey throws a baseball, Gumby swings the bat but misses, and then a springy noise is made.
5. Gumby and Pokey are aerial fighters, and Gumby leaves an ammo hole shaped like him.
6. Gumby and Pokey are inside the rocket about the blast off and leave behind a cloud in a shape of Gumby.
7. Gumby and Pokey chess board.
8. Gumby turns into a puddle, Pokey pops out from above the puddle, and enters the conference hall.
9. Gumby (Return) says, "Here comes another adventure with me and all my friends!"
10. Gumby (Commercial Break) says, "Don't go away! I'll be right back with all my pals after this."
11. Pokey (Return) says, "Holy Toledo! Here's another Gumby Adventure!"
12. Prickle (Commercial Break) says, "Hang on. Gumby will be right back after these messages. You can count on it."
13. Goo (Return) says, "Here comes more fun with Gumby and pals!" (Note: This bumper is heard in Freddy's Nightmares episode, The End of the World.)
14. Professor Kapp (Commercial Break) says, "Goodness gracious! There’ll be more Gumby Adventures right after this!"
15. Gumbo and Gumba (Return) – Gumbo says, "Here comes another adventure with our son Gumby, and his friends." Then Gumba says, "I'm so proud of our boy!"
16. Minga (Commercial Break) says, "Stay right here. My brother Gumby will be back after these messages."

== Home media ==
=== Official releases ===
Throughout the 1980s, Family Home Entertainment released a majority of the 1950s and 1960s Gumby episodes on various VHS collections (the only episodes that didn't get a release were "This Little Piggy", "Tricky Train", and "Foxy Box"). These all retained their original audio tracks as they were released prior to the 1987 revival series, in which completely new soundtracks had to be recorded due to licensing issues involving the original soundtracks.

In 2002, Kid Rhino Home Video (a division distributed by Warner Bros. Family Entertainment and WEA) (a subsidiary of AOL Time Warner) released a seven-disc DVD compilation containing 110 episodes from the 1950s and 1960s. The set was not widely distributed, and it received much negative feedback because the film elements used were the 1980s reissues with the redubbed soundtracks and voices. Three years later, Rhino Home Video/Rhino Retrovision released a two-volume set entitled The Very Best New Adventures of Gumby.

Classic Media had a few home media releases of Gumby starting on September 4, 2007, with Gumby Essentials, Volume 1, which contained episodes from each season of the show. In 2008, Classic Media released a director's cut of Gumby: The Movie that included bonus episodes from the series. That same year, the company also released a two-disc DVD set containing four Christmas themed programs. In addition to a compilation of Gumby episodes titled Gumby Season's Greetings, the other programs include Casper the Friendly Ghost, Fat Albert, and George of the Jungle.

In the fall of 2010, Columbia Music Entertainment released two compilation DVDs in Japan titled "Gumby Best Selection" (ガンビー・ベストセレクション) with permission from Premavision and Classic Media. The two DVD series contains the best selected episodes from both 1950s–1960s era to the 1980s era, all digitally remastered and each have Japanese subtitles. Two DVDs were released: Gumby Best Selection: Early Years 50s-60s, released on September 1, 2010, followed by its English subtitled version on November 17, 2010, and Gumby Best Selection: 80s, released on November 17, 2010.

In 2013, Beyond Home Entertainment released the complete series on NTSC DVDs in Australia as a JB Hi-Fi exclusive. This is a seven-disc, collector's edition set within a tin steelbook case and includes Gumbasia, six "bumper" clips, and every episode from the 1950s, 1960s, and 1980s. The film transfers are said to be the Premavision authorized official versions, which are new restorations from the original negatives.

On June 24, 2015, it was announced that NCircle Entertainment has acquired the distribution rights to the original 1950s and 1960s series, the 1980s revival series and Gumby: The Movie in Region 1. It was announced that they would release The Gumby Show: The Complete 50s Series on DVD on September 22, 2015. Despite the DVD's title, it does not feature full episodes of The Gumby Show, which was a hosted variety program featuring interviews, games, comedy sketches and other content between the Gumby episodes. The Gumby Show: The 60s Series Volume 1 followed on February 23, 2016, and The Gumby Show: The 60s Series Volume 2 on September 13, 2016. NCircle opted to release an incomplete 1960s set that omits five Indian-themed episodes: "Siege of Boonesborough", "Pokey's Price", "Gold Rush Gumby", "Indian Country" and "The Indian Challenge". However, these five episodes were included in the Australian set. On October 2, 2018, the first volume of the 1980's series was released followed by volume 2 on August 6, 2019. The movie was released on Blu-ray/DVD combo pack (containing its original theatrical version) July 18, 2017.

=== Unofficial releases ===
There have been many home media releases that were not authorized by Art Clokey or Clokey Productions, and therefore are considered unofficial releases.

In 1994, GoodTimes Entertainment released Christmas with Gumby on VHS. The set features "Scrooge Loose", "Santa-Witch", "Pigeon in a Plum Tree", and "Toy Crazy"/"Toy Joy" edited together as one half-hour program without any episode title sequences. It was re-released on DVD in 2003. GoodTimes Entertainment also released the VHS Fun with Gumby in 1994, containing the episodes "The Kachinas", "Tree Trouble", "Lion Drive", "Yard Work Made Easy", and "The Magic Show" (edited for time).

In 1996, GoodTimes Entertainment released the VHS Gumby's Greatest Adventures. Later released on DVD in 2003, the set features "Toying Around", "Sad King Ott's Daughter", "The Blockheads", "Gumby Crosses the Delaware" (edited for time), "Gumby Concerto", "The Glob", "Gold Rush Gumby", "Baker's Tour" (edited for time), "The Black Knight", and "Gumby Racer".

In 2013, Legend Films released Gumby's Best Episodes (The Original Adventures) on DVD. The set includes: "Tree Trouble", "Lion Drive", "Yard Work Made Easy", "Sad King Otts Daughter", "The Blockheads", "Gumby Concerto", "The Glob", "Bakers Tour", "The Black Knight", "The Kachinas", "In a Fix", "The Witty Witch", "The Groobee", "Gumby Racer", "Rain for Roo", and "Hidden Valley".

=== Public domain ===
Many budget-priced DVD collections can be found at dollar stores because some episodes have fallen into the public domain. Gumby episodes believed to be in the public domain include "Too Loo", "Gumby Concerto", "Robot Rumpus", "Mysterious Fires," "Stuck on Books", "Gold Rush Gumby", and "Tricky Train". These collections also often include Clokey's experimental film, Gumbasia.

=== Restoration ===
From 2005 to 2006 and from 2012 to 2013, a project took place in attempt to restore the entire 1950s and 1960s Gumby library. These versions are all official and authorized as they contain Premavision copyright notices at the beginning. By 2006, a total of 36 restored transfers existed (33 episodes, the pilot cutdown "Gumby on the Moon", the experimental film "Gumbasia" and a stand-alone transfer of the 1964 theme-song intro), with the rest of the series being completed by 2013. The 1950s episodes were assembled back to their original 11-minute format as close as possible with the existing material. These restorations were not perfect as the original negatives for the 11-minute versions appear to be lost and now only exist split into their syndication halves. This is very noticeable as the restoration for "The Magic Show"/"The Magic Wand" retains the 1960s title sequence "The Magic Wand" instead of the original title sequence "The Magic Show". On a similar note, a narration track recorded for the beginning of the syndicated half titled "Gumby Concerto" is still heard on the restoration for "Too Loo"/"Gumby Concerto". These restored versions have since been released on DVD by Classic Media (the rights holder at the time the first batch of restorations were done) and NCircle Entertainment.

=== Online distribution ===
In 2007, the batch of restored versions were made available to view and/or download on various Internet video sites. Most of them were first made available for free viewing on AOL's In2TV, while later a select few became available on YouTube. These episodes were also made available to purchase through Amazon's video-on-demand service Amazon Video. A few of the later additions to YouTube wound up being sourced from 1980s VHS transfers from Family Home Entertainment instead of actually being restored versions, indicating that the project to restore the entire Gumby library might have been either abandoned or temporarily stalled. The complete 1987 series was later added to Amazon. While many of the aforementioned services are no longer active, Legend Films' Gumby's Best Episodes is available for streaming on Hulu.

In November 2014, the entire first and second seasons of Gumby were launched on television and online via the children's on demand network Kabillion.
