= 1918 in animation =

Events in 1918 in animation.

== Events ==
=== June ===
- June 28: The Fleischer Studios launch their Out of the Inkwell series, which marks the debut of Koko the Clown.

=== July ===
- July 20: Winsor McCay releases The Sinking of the Lusitania, a landmark in realistic animation. The cartoon is based on the real-life sinking of the RMS Lusitania, which brought the United States into the First World War.

== Films released ==
- Unknown date – Sin dejar rastros (Argentina)
- February – Urashima Tarō (Japan)
- February 25 – The Pinkerton Pup's Portrait (United States)
- May 18– The Sinking of the Lusitania (United States)

== Births ==
=== January ===
- January 4: Buddy Baker, American composer (Walt Disney Animation Studios, Bon Voyage, Charlie Brown (and Don't Come Back!), The Puppetoon Movie), (d. 2002).
- January 19: Peter Hobbs, French American actor (voice of Jerry in Heavy Traffic, American General in The Nine Lives of Fritz the Cat, General in Wizards), (d. 2011).
- January 26: Vito Scotti, American actor (voice of Peppo in The Aristocats), (d. 1996).
- January 28: Bob Hilliard, American lyricist (Walt Disney Animation Studios), (d. 1971).

=== February ===
- February 13: Al Pabian, American animator (Chuck Jones, Peanuts specials), (d. 2015).
- February 14: William L. Snyder, American film producer (Rembrandt Films), (d. 1998).
- February 16: Patty Andrews, American singer (co-sang the Johnny Fedora and Alice Blue Bonnet segment in Make Mine Music, and Little Toot in Melody Time), (d. 2013).
- February 22: Don Pardo, American announcer (voice of the Announcer in Totally Minnie, himself in The Simpsons episodes "Moe Letter Blues" and "Moonshine River"), (d. 2014).

=== March ===
- March 2:
  - Bob Givens, American animator, character designer and lay-out artist (Walt Disney Company, Warner Bros. Cartoons, Hanna-Barbera, DePatie-Freleng Enterprises), (d. 2017).
  - Michael Rye, American actor (voice of the title character in The Lone Ranger, Apache Chief and Green Lantern in Super Friends, Duke Igthorn, King Gregor, and Sir Gawain in Adventures of the Gummi Bears, J.J. Wagstaff in Fluppy Dogs, Mr. Slaghoople in The Flintstone Kids, Farley Stillwell in Spider-Man), (d. 2012).
- March 3: Dave Monahan, American screenwriter (Warner Bros. Cartoons), (d. 2003).
- March 6: Harold Mack, English animator and comics artist (worked for Gaumont British Animation, British Animated Pictures and Marten Toonder's animation studio, established his own animation studio The Anglo-Dutch Group), (d. 1975).
- March 9: Vance Colvig, American clown and actor (voice of Chopper in The Yogi Bear Show), (d. 1991).
- March 18: Mike Road, American actor (voice of Race Bannon in Jonny Quest, Zandor in The Herculoids, Ugh in Space Ghost and Dino Boy), (d. 2013).
- March 19: Marvin Mirisch, American film producer and brother of Walter Mirisch (The Pink Panther), (d. 2002).
- March 21: Cliff Norton, American actor (voice of Woggle-Bird in Jack and the Beanstalk, Kakofonous A. Dischord in The Phantom Tollbooth, Ed Huddles in Where's Huddles?, Crow #2 in The Mouse and His Child, Timothy in Pandamonium), (d. 2003).
- March 29: Pearl Bailey, American actress and singer (voice of Mrs. Elephant in Tubby the Tuba, Big Mama in The Fox and the Hound), (d. 1990).

=== April ===
- April 4: Gerry Johnson, American actress (voice of Betty Rubble in the final two seasons of The Flintstones), (d. 1990).
- April 14: Dolores Muñoz Ledo, Mexican voice actress (Latin American voice of Chip in Chip 'n' Dale: Rescue Rangers, Sorceress in He-Man and the Masters of the Universe), (d. 2026).
- April 18: Dick Sutcliffe, American animator (co-creator of Davey and Goliath), (d. 2008).
- April 19: William Arthur Smith, American animation writer, comics artist and illustrator (worked for Walter Lantz), (d. 1989).
- April 25: Tom Daly, Canadian film producer (My Financial Career), (d. 2011).

=== June ===
- June 2: Henry G. Saperstein, American film producer and distributor (UPA), (d. 1998).

=== July ===
- July 2: Wim Boost, aka Wibo, Dutch comics artist, cartoonist and animator, (d. 2006).
- July 6: Sebastian Cabot, English actor (voice of the narrator and Sir Ector in The Sword in the Stone, Bagheera in The Jungle Book, narrator in The Many Adventures of Winnie the Pooh), (d. 1977).

=== August ===
- August 17: Mort Marshall, American actor (voice of Stanley Livingstone, Rocky Maninoff and other various characters in Tennessee Tuxedo and His Tales, Klondike Kat in The Beagles, original voice of the Trix Rabbit), (d. 1979).
- August 19: Floyd Huddleston, American songwriter (The Aristocats, Robin Hood), (d. 1991).
- August 26: Dave Barry, American radio host and actor (voice of Humphrey Bogart in 8 Ball Bunny, voice of Bluto in the Popeye cartoon Seein' Red, White 'N' Blue, voice of Elmer Fudd in Pre-Hysterical Hare), (d. 2001).

=== September ===
- September 22: Ken Southworth, English animator (Walt Disney Company, MGM, Walter Lantz, Hanna-Barbera, Filmation, Clokey Productions, Warner Bros. Animation), (d. 2007).
- September 28: Arnold Stang, American actor (voice of the title character in Top Cat), (d. 2009).

=== October ===
- October 27: Jacques Eggermont, Belgian comics artist and animator (worked for CBA), (d. 1998).
- October 31: Carmen D'Avino, American painter, sculptor and film director, (d. 2004).

=== November ===
- November 5: Alan Tilvern, English actor (portrayed R.K. Maroon in Who Framed Roger Rabbit, voice of Innkeeper in The Lord of the Rings), (d. 2003).
- November 11:
  - Howard Purcell, American comics artist, writer and animator, (d. 1981).
  - Seymour Reit, aka Sy Reit, American animator (Fleischer Studios, co-creator of Casper the Friendly Ghost), writer, screenwriter, comics writer and comics artist, (d. 2001).
- November 30: Efrem Zimbalist Jr., American actor (voice of Alfred Pennyworth in the DC Animated Universe, Dr. Octopus in Spider-Man, Justin Hammer in Iron Man), (d. 2014).

=== December ===
- December 31: Virginia Davis, American actress (portrayed Alice in Walt Disney's Alice Comedies), (d. 2009).

== Deaths ==
=== January ===
- January 9: Emile Reynaud, French inventor and animation pioneer (invented the praxinoscope responsible for the first projected animated films), dies at age 73.
