= Minga =

Minga may refer to:

- Minga (surname)
- Munich (Minga in the Austro-Bavarian language), the capital city of Bavaria, Germany
- Minga Branch, a stream in the United States
- Mink'a (hispanicized as minca, minga), a type of traditional communal work in the Andes
- Minga, a television character from The Gumby Show
- Mingə, a village in the Ismailli Rayon of Azerbaijan
