= Joseph W. Clokey =

American academic, organist, and composer (1890–1960)

- Born: August 28, 1890; New Albany, Indiana, U.S.
- Died: September 14, 1960 (aged 70); Covina, California, U.S.
- Occupations: Organist, composer
- Children: Art Clokey

Joseph Waddell Clokey (August 28, 1890, New Albany, Indiana – September 14, 1960, Covina, California) was an American educator, organist and composer of sacred and secular music in the first half of the 20th century.

== Career ==
A student of Edgar Stillman Kelley, he served as dean of the School of Fine Arts at his alma mater, Miami University, from 1939 until 1946, and had previously been professor of organ at Miami University (1916–1923) and Pomona College. He was a faculty initiate of Phi Mu Alpha Sinfonia, and is responsible for several arrangements of music used in the fraternity's initiation ritual. As an undergraduate, he and Joseph M. Bachelor wrote the first song for the fraternity Phrenocon, which later became Phi Kappa Tau.

His work included two symphonies, including the "Dorian" Symphony, two orchestral suites, a string quartet, a cello and violin sonata, twelve choral works in large form, five operas, organ suites, many organ pieces, and more than a hundred published choral works. These include "The Musical Trust," a 1925 ballad about a flautist, a tuba-player, and a drum-and-cymbal combo who cannot make any money on their own so they form a band together. This piece incorporates snatches from familiar American tunes including "Turkey in the Straw," "Ta-ra-ra Boom-de-ay," "The Stars and Stripes Forever," "Dixieland," "Jingle Bells," "How Dry I Am," "Tramp, Tramp, Tramp" and "Columbia, the Gem of the Ocean."

Clokey's father (also named Joseph Clokey) was a Presbyterian pastor, and this was certainly an influence on the younger Joseph Clokey's focus on sacred music. He was one of the most widely sung composers in churches during the 1950s.

He was a National Patron of Delta Omicron, an international professional music fraternity.

== Legacy ==
His adopted son, Art Clokey, was the creator of clay animation characters Gumby, Pokey and Davey and Goliath.

For a time, there was a building on the Miami University campus named Clokey Hall until it was torn down. When Sesquicentennial Chapel was built at Miami University, the organ loft was named after Clokey as well.

In 1987, composer John Ness Beck founded the John Ness Beck Foundation in memory of Clokey and Randall Thompson to promote traditional sacred choral music.
