= Ken Southworth =

- Born: September 22, 1918; Farnworth, Lancashire, England
- Died: December 6, 2007 (aged 89); Anaheim, California, U.S.
- Occupation: Animator
- Years active: 1944–2000
- Employer(s): Walt Disney Productions (1944-1951); John Sutherland Productions (1948-1949); Paul Fennell Pictures (1950); Walter Lantz Productions (1951-1954); MGM Cartoons (1957-1958); Rudy Cataldi Productions/Sam Sing Productions (1950's); Animation Associates (1960-61); Hanna-Barbera (1961-1993); Clokey Productions (1961-1964); Filmation (1968-1974; 1989); Fine Arts Films (1970); Ruby-Spears (1982); Warner Bros. Animation (1989); Porchlight Entertainment (1996)

Ken Southworth (September 22, 1918 – December 6, 2007) was an English-American animator, cartoonist and animation instructor who worked for a number of major animation studios throughout his nearly 60-year career, including Walt Disney Studios, Hanna-Barbera, Filmation, Warner Bros. Animation, the Metro-Goldwyn-Mayer cartoon department, Walter Lantz Productions and Clokey Productions. His credits included Disney's Alice in Wonderland and Legend of Sleepy Hollow, as well as Hanna-Barbera's The Flintstones, Space Ghost and Dino Boy, Scooby-Doo, Where Are You! and The Smurfs among others.

== Early life ==
Ken Southworth was born in Farnworth, Lancashire, England, on September 22, 1918. He won a scholarship to the Chicago Art Institute and moved to the U.S. when he was just 10 years old.

Southworth held dual citizenship in both the United States and the United Kingdom, but mostly worked in the U.S.

== Career ==
Southworth began working as an animator for Walt Disney Productions in 1944. He assisted legendary animator Milt Kahl with Alice in Wonderland (1951) by completing much of the film's rough animation. He also helped animator Frank Thomas with the Wicked Stepmother character in Cinderella. Southworth's other contributions while at Disney included The Adventures of Ichabod and Mister Toad, The Three Caballeros (1944), and Song of the South, as well as a number of shorts featuring iconic Disney characters such as Pluto, Goofy and Donald Duck.

Southworth briefly worked at a number of smaller animation studios after working at Disney, including the Metro-Goldwyn-Mayer cartoon department, Rudy Cataldi Productions and Sam Sing Productions. He is reportedly credited for creating the opening title sequence for Woody Woodpecker while working for Walter Lantz Productions.

He later worked for animation powerhouse Hanna-Barbera for twenty one years. His credits at Hanna-Barbera included Scooby-Doo, Huckleberry Hound, The Flintstones, Jonny Quest, Space Ghost, Top Cat, The Smurfs and Swat Kats. He returned to Hanna-Barbera in the mid-1980s in order to teach courses in basic animation. He directed all 100 episodes of Q. T. Hush, produced by Animation Associates in color, and aired in syndication from September 1960 to February 1961.

Southworth's later work included the Looney Tunes animation which was featured in the live action film, Gremlins 2: The New Batch and the Filmation film, Pinocchio and the Emperor of the Night.

Southworth was also a leading teacher and instructor in the field of animation. Besides Hanna-Barbera, Southworth taught seminars and courses at a number of institutions, including Glendale Animation Studios, the Art Institute of Southern California, the California State University, Fullerton, and VanArts. In 1998, he released a successful three volume series of video Home Instruction course, The Ken Southworth Animation Program in association with Ray Pointer and Inkwell Images.

== Death ==
Ken Southworth died at his home in Anaheim, California, on December 6, 2007, at the age of 89 following a series of strokes.
