= Semper Gumby =

Unofficial motto for US military divisions

Semper Gumby is an unofficial dog Latin motto meaning "Always Flexible," used within the United States Military, NOAA Commissioned Officer Corps, and Federal Emergency Management Agency. It is a play on several official mottos such as Semper Fidelis ("Always Faithful"), Semper Fortis ("Always strong"), Semper Paratus ("Always Ready"), and Semper Servians' ' ("Always Serving"). Semper Gumby refers to the animated clay character Gumby. The real Latin phrase meaning "Always Flexible" would be Semper Flexibilis. The first use of Semper Gumby is often assigned to Captain Jay Farmer of HMM-264 in 1984. He actually flew with a Gumby character toy mounted on the standby compass on the instrument panel of his CH-46E nicknamed "Airwolf". However, the term was in use in 1977/78 in 1st Battalion, 5th Marines at Camp Pendleton. Another popular belief is that the term was first referenced by the 1st Sgt TOW Co. 3rd Tank Battalion 7th Marine Expeditionary Brigade (Task Force Ripper) prior to deployment of Operation Desert Shield from MCAGCC 29 Palms, Ca. on August 15, 1990. "'Marines,' my platoon commander in Nam used to tell us, 'Semper Gumby, Always Flexible.'" The 3rd Battalion, 11th Marines has "always flexible" as part of their official motto. Semper Gumby is also a common phrase used in the field of emergency management.
