= Keyvəndi =

- Municipality
- Location within Azerbaijan
- Coordinates: 40°41′29″N 48°18′57″E
- Country: Azerbaijan
- Rayon: Ismailli

Population
  - Total: 467
- Time zone: UTC+4 (AZT)
  - Summer (DST): UTC+5 (AZT)

Keyvəndi (also, Keyvendi) is a village and municipality in the Ismailli Rayon of Azerbaijan. It has a population of 467. The municipality consists of the villages of Keyvəndi and Mingə.
