= Dallas McKennon =

American actor (1919–2009)

- McKennon c. 1965
- Born: Dallas Raymond McKennon; July 19, 1919; La Grande, Oregon, U.S.
- Died: July 14, 2009 (aged 89); Raymond, Washington, U.S.
- Other names: Dal McKennon; Charles Farrington
- Occupation: Actor
- Years active: 1940–1995
- Spouse: Betty Warner (m. 1942)
- Children: 8

Dallas Raymond McKennon (July 19, 1919 – July 14, 2009), sometimes credited as Dal McKennon, was an American actor. With a career lasting over 50 years, McKennon's best-known voice roles include Gumby for Art Clokey, Archie Andrews in several different Archie series for Filmation, and Buzz Buzzard in the Woody Woodpecker cartoons.

== Early life and career ==
Born near La Grande, Oregon, Mckennon served during World War II in the Army Signal Corps in Alaska. His mother died when he was a child, so he lived on a farm with his aunt and uncle where he was fascinated with nature.

McKennon's best-known voice roles were Gumby for Art Clokey, Archie Andrews in several different Archie series for Filmation, and the primary voice of Buzz Buzzard in the Woody Woodpecker cartoons. In the early 1950s, McKennon created and hosted his own daily kids TV wraparound show, Space Funnies/Capt. Jet, which was aired weekday mornings on KNXT (KCBS-TV) TV Ch. 2 in Los Angeles. It was the first Los Angeles–based kids show to air reruns of The Little Rascals and Laurel & Hardy shorts. He was also the primary voice actor for the 1960 cartoon series Q.T. Hush. McKennon was also the voice of the Hardy Boys' sidekick, Chet Morton, in the 1969 animated mystery series.

McKennon also sang and provided many character voices, mainly for Walt Disney Animation. He has voice acted in Pinocchio, Lady and the Tramp, Sleeping Beauty, One Hundred and One Dalmatians, Mary Poppins, and Bedknobs and Broomsticks; his laughter as a hyena in Lady and the Tramp was later recycled as a stock sound effect for the voice of Ripper Roo in the Crash Bandicoot video game series. He also provided the voices for many Disney attractions such as the Big Thunder Mountain Railroad safety announcement, a pair of laughing hyenas in the Africa Room portion of It's a Small World, Benjamin Franklin's voice in Epcot's The American Adventure, Epcot's WorldKey information kiosks, and Zeke in the Country Bear Jamboree.

McKennon's best-known live action role is the innkeeper Cincinnatus in Daniel Boone. He also had a bit part as a diner cook in The Birds and as a gas station attendant in Clambake. His final movie as a voice director was Gumby: The Movie under the pseudonym Charles Farrington. He voiced Gumby, Fatbuckle, Lucky Claybert, and Professor Kapp.

McKennon was an avid Oregon Trail historian. He visited schools around the Northwest lecturing children about Oregon history and worked at the Oregon Trail Interpretive Center giving instructional speeches, and put together plays, skits, songs, stories, and informational documents leading up to the Oregon Trail's sesquicentennial (150th anniversary).

He also worked with Oregon Public Broadcasting creating The Pappenheimers, an instructional video series to help teach children German. His character lived in a Volkswagen Type 2 and would tell stories about relatives in Germany.

== Personal life ==
In 1942, McKennon married his childhood love interest, Betty Warner, in Portland, Oregon. The couple had six daughters and two sons. They lived in California until 1968, when they moved to Cannon Beach, Oregon, from where McKennon commuted for voice acting and voiceover roles.

== Death ==
McKennon died from natural causes aged 89 on July 14, 2009, at the Willapa Harbor Care Center in Raymond, Washington, five days shy of his 90th birthday.

== Filmography ==
=== Film ===
- Pinocchio (1940) – Donkeys (voice, uncredited)
- Dumbo (1941) – Hippos / Bears (voice, uncredited)
- Peter Pan (1953) – Parrot (voice, uncredited)
- Lady and the Tramp (1955) – Toughy / Pedro / Professor / Hyena (voices)
- Paul Bunyan (1958, Short) – Cal McNab (voice)
- Sleeping Beauty (1959) – Owl/Diablo (voice)
- Bend of the River (1952) – Miner (uncredited)
- Tom Thumb (1959) – Con-Fu-Shon
- The Tingler (1959) – Projectionist (uncredited)
- Have Rocket, Will Travel (1959) – The Unicorn (voice, uncredited)
- One Hundred and One Dalmatians (1961) – Barking Dogs (voice)
- Womanhunt (1962)
- Let No Man Write My Epitaph (1960) – Court Clerk (uncredited)
- Wagon Train (1960) – Hotel Clerk Kelly
- The Silent Call (1961) – Old Man
- Twist Around the Clock (1961) – Motel Proprietor (uncredited)
- Son of Flubber (1963) – 1st Juror (uncredited)
- The Birds (1963) – Sam, the Cook (uncredited)
- House of the Damned (1963) – Mr. Quinby
- Twilight of Honor (1963) – Mr. Phillips (uncredited)
- The Wheeler Dealers (1963) – Sea Captain / Prissy Hotel Clerk (uncredited)
- Come Out Party (1963, Short) – Inspector Willoughby (voice)
- The Misadventures of Merlin Jones (1964) – Detective Hutchins
- A Tiger Walks (1964) – Reporter (uncredited)
- 7 Faces of Dr. Lao (1964) – Lean Cowboy
- Mary Poppins (1964) – Fox / Penguin #2 / Hunting Horse / Merry-Go-Round Operator (voices, uncredited)
- The Glory Guys (1965) – Karl Harpane
- Winnie the Pooh and the Honey Tree (1966) – Bees (voice, uncredited)
- Clambake (1967) – Bearded Gas Station Attendant (uncredited)
- Sissy Sheriff (1967, Short) – Sugarfoot / Dirty McNasty
- Cat and Dupli-cat (1967, Tom and Jerry short) – Jerry Mouse (singing voice)
- The Love God? (1969) – Bird Caller (uncredited)
- Bedknobs and Broomsticks (1971) – Bear (voice)
- Treasure Island (1973) – Captain Flint / Ben Gunn (voice)
- Oliver Twist (1974) – Bookseller / Charlie Bates (voices)
- Journey Back to Oz (1972) – Omby Amby (voice)
- Emilio and His Magical Bull (1975)
- The Many Adventures of Winnie the Pooh (1977) – Bees (voice, uncredited)
- The Rescuers (1977) – Evinrude (voice, uncredited)
- The Cat from Outer Space (1978) – Charlie Cooney
- Hot Lead and Cold Feet (1978) – Saloon Man
- Tourist Trap (1979) – Mask (voice, archived recording of laugh)
- The Fox and the Hound (1981) – Squeaks (voice, uncredited)
- Mystery Mansion (1983) – Sam
- The Adventures of Mark Twain (1985) – Jim Smiley (voice)
- The Black Cauldron (1985) – Cat / Geese / Goat (voice, uncredited)
- The Brave Little Toaster (1987) – Frogs (voice, uncredited)
- The Puppetoon Movie (1987) – Gumby
- Wee Sing: King Cole's Party (1987) – Crooked Old Man
- The Talking Christmas Tree (1990) – Santa Claus
- Frozen Assets (1992) – Stud of the Year Octogenarian
- Gumby: The Movie (1995) – Gumby / Professor Kapp / Fatbuckle / Lucky Claybert / Nobuckle (voice) (credited as Charles Farrington)
- Elf (2003) – Jack-in-the-Box (voice, archived recording of laugh)
- Over the Hedge (2006) - "Rabid" Hammy (voice, archived recording of laugh)

=== Television ===
- Woody Woodpecker (1952–1972) – Buzz Buzzard / Willoughby / Paw (voices)
- Captain Jet and the Little Rascals (1956–1957) – Captain Jet (voice)
- Hergé's Adventures of Tintin (1957) – Tintin / Professor Calculus (voices)
- The Gumby Show (1957, 1960–1964) – Gumby / Pokey / Prickle / Nopey / Gumbo (only in Chicken Feed) / Henry (re-dubbed voice) / Rodgy (re-dubbed voice) / Granny (voices)
- The Woody Woodpecker Show (1957–1958, Walter Lantz Series) – Buzz Buzzard (voice)
- Bucky and Pepito (1959–1960) – Bucky and Pepito (voice)
- Q. T. Hush (1960) – Q.T. Hush / Shamus (voices)
- Inspector Willoughby (1960–1965, Walter Lantz series)
- Gunsmoke (1961–1962) – Jake / Homesteader
- Courageous Cat and Minute Mouse (1960–1962) – Courageous Cat / Minute Mouse / Additional voices
- Ben Casey (1962) – Waco Martin
- Mr. Smith Goes to Washington (1963) – Jim Tolliver
- My Favorite Martian (1963) – Mailman
- Daniel Boone (1964, 80 episodes) – Cincinnatus
- Sinbad Jr. and His Magic Belt (1965–1966) – Sinbad Jr. (voice)
- Bonanza (1966) – Jenkins
- How the Grinch Stole Christmas (1966) – Max (voice)
- The Andy Griffith Show (1967) – Brian Jackson
- Iron Horse (1967) – Gabe
- Dundee and the Culhane (1967, TV Series) – Al
- Did You Hear the One About the Traveling Saleslady? (1968) – Old Soldier
- Lotsa Luck (1968) – (voice)
- Archie's Funhouse (1968) – Archie Andrews / Hot Dog / Mr. Weatherbee (voices)
- The Archie Show (1968) – Archie Andrews / Hot Dog / Mr. Weatherbee (voice)
- The Hardy Boys (1969) – Joe Hardy / Chubby Morton (voice)
- Sabrina the Teenage Witch (1969–1970) – Salem / Archie Andrews / Hot Dog / Mr. Weatherbee / Batso / Ratso (voices)
- The Andersonville Trial (1970, TV Movie) – First Guard
- Sabrina and the Groovie Goolies (1970) – Salem / Archie Andrews / Hot Dog / Mr. Weatherby / Rover / Batso / Ratso (voices)
- Aesop's Fables (1971) – Owl / Frog / Rooster and Beaver (voices)
- Cannon (1971) – Bucky Fosdick
- Daffy Duck and Porky Pig Meet the Groovie Goolies (1972) – Sylvester the Cat (voice, meowing sounds)
- The U.S. of Archie (1974) – Archie Andrews / Hot Dog / Mr. Weatherbee (voices)
- Space Academy (1977) – Johnny Sunseed
- The American Adventure (1982) – Benjamin Franklin / Soldier #2
- Goof Troop (1992) – Old Man in Bathtub (voice)

=== Video games ===
- Crash Bandicoot (1996) – Ripper Roo (laugh only, uncredited)
- Crash Bandicoot 2: Cortex Strikes Back (1997) – Ripper Roo (laugh only, uncredited)
- Vampire Savior (1997) – Laugh sound effect (uncredited)
- Crash Team Racing (1999) – Ripper Roo (laugh only, uncredited)
- M.U.G.E.N (1999) – Various voices (archive recordings)
- Crash Bash (2000) – Ripper Roo (laugh only, uncredited)
- Disney's Magical Mirror Starring Mickey Mouse (2002) – The Ghost (laugh only, uncredited)
- Grabbed by the Ghoulies (2003) – Laugh sound effect (uncredited)
- LocoRoco (2006) – Stock laughter heard in the Dolangomeri level theme; reused in the sequel in the same world's level theme (uncredited)

=== Theme park attractions ===
- Mine Train Through Nature's Wonderland – Narrator
- Big Thunder Mountain Railroad – Safety spiel
- Country Bear Jamboree – Zeke
- The Hall of Presidents – Andrew Jackson
- It's a Small World – Laughing hyenas
- The American Adventure – Benjamin Franklin
- The Haunted Mansion – Deaf Old Man

=== Commercials ===
- Kellogg's Corn Flakes - Cornelius Rooster

=== Walt Disney and other record albums ===
- Story and Songs of Mary Poppins - Bert/Narrator
- Story and Songs of The Jungle Book - Narrator/Bagheera
- More Jungle Book - Narrator/Bagheera
- Story and Songs of Bedknobs and Broomsticks - Emelius/Narrator
- Story of Lady and the Tramp - Tramp
- Story of 20,000 Leagues Under the Sea - Ned Land
- The Story of Sword in the Stone - Sir Ector
- Hector, the Stowaway Pup - Hector
- Donald Duck and His Friends – Scrooge McDuck
- The Wizard of Oz - Scarecrow, other voices
- The Scarecrow of Oz - Captain Andy
- The Tin Woodman of Oz - Scarecrow, other voices
- The Cowardly Lion of Oz - Scarecrow, other voices
- The Story of Treasure Island - Narrator
- The Story of Robin Hood - Narrator
- The Story of The Boatniks - Narrator/Harry
- The Story of The Love Bug - Peter Thorndyke
- Toby Tyler in the Circus - Mr. Tupper
- The Story of Swiss Family Robinson - Father
- The Hall of Presidents Soundtrack - Andrew Jackson
- The Story of 101 Dalmatians - Collie, other voices
- tom thumb Soundtrack - Various Voices
- Woody Woodpecker and His Friends - Inspector Willoughby
- The Animal Village - Various Voices
- Wee Sing Nursery Rhymes and Lullabies (1985) – Narrator / Crooked old man
- Wee Sing America (1987) – Various voices
- Wee Sing Silly Songs (1988 re-recording) – Various voices
- Wee Sing: Fun n Folk (1989) – Various voices
- Wee Sing Around the Campfire (1990 re-recording) – Various voices
- Wee Sing Dinosaurs (1991) – Various voices
- Wee Sing Animals Animals Animals (1999) – Various voices
- Centerpoint: Poetry & Music for Christmas – Featured reader
