= Dick Sutcliffe =

American animator

Richard Towne Sutcliffe (April 18, 1918 – May 11, 2008) was an American animator and one of the creators of the 1960s stop motion religious animated series, Davey and Goliath.

Town was born on April 18, 1918, in Columbia, Pennsylvania. However, he grew up in Taneytown, Maryland. His father, Rev. Alfred Towne Sutcliffe, was a Lutheran minister. He began his career as a journalist and photographer in Roanoke, Virginia.

Sutcliffe developed Davey and Goliath with Gumby creators Art Clokey and Ruth Clokey Goodell. The show was aimed at spreading simple religious messages and morals to young television viewers, while not confusing them with complicated concepts.

Dick Sutcliffe died in Dallas, Texas, from complications of a stroke at the age of 90 on May 11, 2008.
