= Mingə =

- Location within Azerbaijan
- Coordinates: 40°42′31″N 48°19′36″E
- Country: Azerbaijan
- Rayon: Ismailli
- Municipality: Keyvəndi
- Time zone: UTC+4 (AZT)
  - Summer (DST): UTC+5 (AZT)

Mingə is a village in the Ismailli Rayon of Azerbaijan. The village forms part of the municipality of Keyvəndi. The area is renowned for excessive bush and dryness, due to being situated on one of the two highest peaks of Azerbaijan.
