= Q. T. Hush =

- Title screen
- Genre: Detective fiction
- Created by: Rudy Cataldi; Lou Zukor; John Boersema
- Developed by: M & A. Alexander
- Directed by: Rudy Cataldi
- Voices of: Dallas McKennon
- Theme music composer: Hoyt S. Curtin
- Country of origin: United States
- Original language: English
- No. of seasons: 1
- No. of episodes: 100

Production
- Producers: Max Alexander; Arthur Alexander
- Running time: 3 1/2 mins
- Production company: Animation Associates

Original release
- Network: KTTV
- Release: September 24, 1960 – February 8, 1961

Q.T. Hush is a 1960–61 American animated cartoon released in syndication, beginning on September 24, 1960. The show's 100 three-and-a-half-minute episodes, all in color, were directed by veteran animator Rudy Cataldi, and produced by Animation Associates. The series was designed to air either as a daily five-minute cliffhanger in a locally-produced children's show, or packaged as a half-hour program. Each story was ten parts; in the daily version, the story would last for two weeks.

The main character was voiced by veteran voice actor Dallas McKennon.

This was Animation Associates' only show. All of the episodes survive.

== Plot ==
Q.T. was a private detective with two assistants, his bloodhound Shamus (who, like Q.T., wore a deerstalker hat) and Quincy, who wore a trench coat, slouch hat and smoked cigars. Quincy was actually Q.T.'s shadow and could not only speak but slide under doors as well. As with many private eyes, Hush had a love-hate relationship with the local police in the form of Chief Muldoon.

Aside from the serial aspect and being one of the few color cartoons of its era, Q.T. was famous for inventing the cell phone (a pocket radio that could be used to call conventional land lines) and the fax machine (QT could shove documents into a phone mouthpiece and have the identical document appear in the receiver of who he was speaking with).

His initials reinforced his surname by invoking the old expression for quiet secrecy, "on the Q.T."

== Characters ==
- Q.T. Hush (Dallas McKennon) -
- Shamus -
- Police Chief Muldoon -
- Quincy -
- Scavenger Hill Mob -
- Yo Yo -
- Ping Pong -
- Baffles -
- Al Cologne -
- Professor Zappo -
- Gootch -
- Dr. Tickle -
- Mr. Snide -
- One Ton -

== Episodes ==
=== Season 1 ===
| No. overall | No. in season | Title | Directed by | Original release date |
|---|---|---|---|---|
| 1 | 1 | "The Rhyme-Line Caper, Episode 1: Doom in the Room" | Ken Southworth | September 24, 1960 |
| 2 | 2 | "The Rhyme-Line Caper, Episode 2: Terror on the Bridge" | Ken Southworth | September 25, 1960 |
| 3 | 3 | "The Rhyme-Line Caper, Episode 3: He Who Blasts Last" | Ken Southworth | September 26, 1960 |
| 4 | 4 | "The Rhyme-Line Caper, Episode 4: Double crossbow" | Ken Southworth | September 27, 1960 |
| 5 | 5 | "The Rhyme-Line Caper, Episode 5: Deadly Descent" | Ken Southworth | September 28, 1960 |
| 6 | 6 | "The Rhyme-Line Caper, Episode 6: Flaming Fury" | Ken Southworth | October 1, 1960 |
| 7 | 7 | "The Rhyme-Line Caper, Episode 7: Bang with a tang" | Ken Southworth | October 2, 1960 |
| 8 | 8 | "The Rhyme-Line Caper, Episode 8: Hiss of Doom" | Ken Southworth | October 3, 1960 |
| 9 | 9 | "The Rhyme-Line Caper, Episode 9: The Iron Tomb" | Ken Southworth | October 4, 1960 |
| 10 | 10 | "The Rhyme-Line Caper, Episode 10: Farce Meets Force" | Ken Southworth | October 5, 1960 |

=== Season 2 ===
| No. overall | No. in season | Title | Directed by | Original release date |
|---|---|---|---|---|
| 11 | 1 | "The Protection Plan Caper, Episode 1: Fuse Blews" | Ken Southworth | October 6, 1960 |
| 12 | 2 | "The Protection Plan Caper, Episode 2: Rocket Racket" | Ken Southworth | October 9, 1960 |
| 13 | 3 | "The Protection Plan Caper, Episode 3: Watery Grave" | Ken Southworth | October 10, 1960 |
| 14 | 4 | "The Protection Plan Caper, Episode 4: Pinwheel Panic" | Ken Southworth | October 11, 1960 |
| 15 | 5 | "The Protection Plan Caper, Episode 5: Armored Alarm" | Ken Southworth | October 12, 1960 |
| 16 | 6 | "The Protection Plan Caper, Episode 6: Motor Maniac" | Ken Southworth | October 15, 1960 |
| 17 | 7 | "The Protection Plan Caper, Episode 7: Tommy-Gun Trouble" | Ken Southworth | October 16, 1960 |
| 18 | 8 | "The Protection Plan Caper, Episode 8: Leap in the Deep" | Ken Southworth | October 17, 1960 |
| 19 | 9 | "The Protection Plan Caper, Episode 9: High-Dive Dilemma" | Ken Southworth | October 18, 1960 |
| 20 | 10 | "The Protection Plan Caper, Episode 10: Crunch Punch" | Ken Southworth | October 19, 1960 |

=== Season 3 ===
| No. overall | No. in season | Title | Directed by | Original release date |
|---|---|---|---|---|
| 21 | 1 | "The Red-Eyed Raven Caper, Episode 1: Cave-In Calamity" | Ken Southworth | October 22, 1960 |
| 22 | 2 | "The Red-Eyed Raven Caper, Episode 2: Nose Trouble" | Ken Southworth | October 23, 1960 |
| 23 | 3 | "The Red-Eyed Raven Caper, Episode 3: Torture Trap" | Ken Southworth | October 24, 1960 |
| 24 | 4 | "The Red-Eyed Raven Caper, Episode 4: Cat Fright" | Ken Southworth | October 25, 1960 |
| 25 | 5 | "The Red-Eyed Raven Caper, Episode 5: Head Hunter Havoc" | Ken Southworth | October 26, 1960 |
| 26 | 6 | "The Red-Eyed Raven Caper, Episode 6: Watery Doom" | Ken Southworth | October 29, 1960 |
| 27 | 7 | "The Red-Eyed Raven Caper, Episode 7: Pully Peril" | Ken Southworth | October 30, 1960 |
| 28 | 8 | "The Red-Eyed Raven Caper, Episode 8: Snap Trap" | Ken Southworth | October 31, 1960 |
| 29 | 9 | "The Red-Eyed Raven Caper, Episode 9: French-Fry Fright" | Ken Southworth | November 1, 1960 |
| 30 | 10 | "The Red-Eyed Raven Caper, Episode 10: Strange Reward" | Ken Southworth | November 2, 1960 |

=== Season 4 ===
| No. overall | No. in season | Title | Directed by | Original release date |
|---|---|---|---|---|
| 31 | 1 | "The Statue of Liberty Caper, Episode 1: Taking Liberty" | Ken Southworth | November 5, 1960 |
| 32 | 2 | "The Statue of Liberty Caper, Episode 2: Liberty Vanishes" | Ken Southworth | November 6, 1960 |
| 33 | 3 | "The Statue of Liberty Caper, Episode 3: Liberty Mourned" | Ken Southworth | November 7, 1960 |
| 34 | 4 | "The Statue of Liberty Caper, Episode 4: Liberty's Grave" | Ken Southworth | November 8, 1960 |
| 35 | 5 | "The Statue of Liberty Caper, Episode 5: Liberty Speaks" | Ken Southworth | November 9, 1960 |
| 36 | 6 | "The Statue of Liberty Caper, Episode 6: Liberty Dunked" | Ken Southworth | November 12, 1960 |
| 37 | 7 | "The Statue of Liberty Caper, Episode 7: Liberty Bomb" | Ken Southworth | November 13, 1960 |
| 38 | 8 | "The Statue of Liberty Caper, Episode 8: Liberty at Any Price" | Ken Southworth | November 14, 1960 |
| 39 | 9 | "The Statue of Liberty Caper, Episode 9: Liberty Penny Panic" | Ken Southworth | November 15, 1960 |
| 40 | 10 | "The Statue of Liberty Caper, Episode 10: Liberty Restored" | Ken Southworth | November 16, 1960 |

=== Season 5 ===
| No. overall | No. in season | Title | Directed by | Original release date |
|---|---|---|---|---|
| 41 | 1 | "The Magic Mix-Up Caper, Episode 1: Double Trouble" | Ken Southworth | November 19, 1960 |
| 42 | 2 | "The Magic Mix-Up Caper, Episode 2: Tickle or Treat" | Ken Southworth | November 20, 1960 |
| 43 | 3 | "The Magic Mix-Up Caper, Episode 3: Fume Doom" | Ken Southworth | November 21, 1960 |
| 44 | 4 | "The Magic Mix-Up Caper, Episode 4: Turnabout Rout" | Ken Southworth | November 22, 1960 |
| 45 | 5 | "The Magic Mix-Up Caper, Episode 5: Bomb Bowl" | Ken Southworth | November 23, 1960 |
| 46 | 6 | "The Magic Mix-Up Caper, Episode 6: Fire Fear" | Ken Southworth | November 26, 1960 |
| 47 | 7 | "The Magic Mix-Up Caper, Episode 7: Crash Smash" | Ken Southworth | November 27, 1960 |
| 48 | 8 | "The Magic Mix-Up Caper, Episode 8: Oil Foil" | Ken Southworth | November 28, 1960 |
| 49 | 9 | "The Magic Mix-Up Caper, Episode 9: Terrain Terror" | Ken Southworth | November 29, 1960 |
| 50 | 10 | "The Magic Mix-Up Caper, Episode 10: Magic Mix-Up" | Ken Southworth | November 30, 1960 |

=== Season 6 ===
| No. overall | No. in season | Title | Directed by | Original release date |
|---|---|---|---|---|
| 51 | 1 | "The Doomsday Caper, Episode 1: Quicksand of Doom" | Ken Southworth | December 3, 1960 |
| 52 | 2 | "The Doomsday Caper, Episode 2: Flash of Doom" | Ken Southworth | December 4, 1960 |
| 53 | 3 | "The Doomsday Caper, Episode 3: Sound of Doom" | Ken Southworth | December 5, 1960 |
| 54 | 4 | "The Doomsday Caper, Episode 4: Pit of Doom" | Ken Southworth | December 6, 1960 |
| 55 | 5 | "The Doomsday Caper, Episode 5: Light of Doom" | Ken Southworth | December 7, 1960 |
| 56 | 6 | "The Doomsday Caper, Episode 6: Swamp of Doom" | Ken Southworth | December 10, 1960 |
| 57 | 7 | "The Doomsday Caper, Episode 7: Gas of Doom" | Ken Southworth | December 11, 1960 |
| 58 | 8 | "The Doomsday Caper, Episode 8: Brain of Doom" | Ken Southworth | December 12, 1960 |
| 59 | 9 | "The Doomsday Caper, Episode 9: Serpent of Doom" | Ken Southworth | December 13, 1960 |
| 60 | 10 | "The Doomsday Caper, Episode 10: Hour of Doom" | Ken Southworth | December 14, 1960 |

=== Season 7 ===
| No. overall | No. in season | Title | Directed by | Original release date |
|---|---|---|---|---|
| 61 | 1 | "The Goofy Ghost Caper, Episode 1: Ghost Busters" | Ken Southworth | December 17, 1960 |
| 62 | 2 | "The Goofy Ghost Caper, Episode 2: Ghost Berserk" | Ken Southworth | December 18, 1960 |
| 63 | 3 | "The Goofy Ghost Caper, Episode 3: Ghost's Revenge" | Ken Southworth | December 19, 1960 |
| 64 | 4 | "The Goofy Ghost Caper, Episode 4: Ghost is Clear" | Ken Southworth | December 20, 1960 |
| 65 | 5 | "The Goofy Ghost Caper, Episode 5: Ghost of a Chance" | Ken Southworth | December 21, 1960 |
| 66 | 6 | "The Goofy Ghost Caper, Episode 6: Ghostly Image" | Ken Southworth | December 24, 1960 |
| 67 | 7 | "The Goofy Ghost Caper, Episode 7: Giddy Ghosts" | Ken Southworth | December 25, 1960 |
| 68 | 8 | "The Goofy Ghost Caper, Episode 8: Ghost Duel" | Ken Southworth | December 26, 1960 |
| 69 | 9 | "The Goofy Ghost Caper, Episode 9: Ghost Warfare" | Ken Southworth | December 27, 1960 |
| 70 | 10 | "The Goofy Ghost Caper, Episode 10: Ghosts South" | Ken Southworth | December 28, 1960 |

=== Season 8 ===
| No. overall | No. in season | Title | Directed by | Original release date |
|---|---|---|---|---|
| 71 | 1 | "The Big Masquerade Caper, Episode 1: The Big Sphinx Robbery" | Ken Southworth | December 31, 1960 |
| 72 | 2 | "The Big Masquerade Caper, Episode 2: The Big Deep Freeze" | Ken Southworth | January 1, 1961 |
| 73 | 3 | "The Big Masquerade Caper, Episode 3: The Big Dummy-Up" | Ken Southworth | January 2, 1961 |
| 74 | 4 | "The Big Masquerade Caper, Episode 4: The Big Dip" | Ken Southworth | January 3, 1961 |
| 75 | 5 | "The Big Masquerade Caper, Episode 5: The Big Tie-Up" | Ken Southworth | January 4, 1961 |
| 76 | 6 | "The Big Masquerade Caper, Episode 6: The Big Blast" | Ken Southworth | January 7, 1961 |
| 77 | 7 | "The Big Masquerade Caper, Episode 7: The Big Pay-Off" | Ken Southworth | January 8, 1961 |
| 78 | 8 | "The Big Masquerade Caper, Episode 8: The Big Frame Up" | Ken Southworth | January 9, 1961 |
| 79 | 9 | "The Big Masquerade Caper, Episode 9: The Big Squeal" | Ken Southworth | January 10, 1961 |
| 80 | 10 | "The Big Masquerade Caper, Episode 10: The Big Pinch" | Ken Southworth | January 11, 1961 |

=== Season 9 ===
| No. overall | No. in season | Title | Directed by | Original release date |
|---|---|---|---|---|
| 81 | 1 | "The Carnival Caper, Episode 1: Carnival Chaos" | Ken Southworth | January 14, 1961 |
| 82 | 2 | "The Carnival Caper, Episode 2: Canival Creeps" | Ken Southworth | January 15, 1961 |
| 83 | 3 | "The Carnival Caper, Episode 3: Carnival House of Horrors" | Ken Southworth | January 16, 1961 |
| 84 | 4 | "The Carnival Caper, Episode 4: Carnival Cut-Ups" | Ken Southworth | January 17, 1961 |
| 85 | 5 | "The Carnival Caper, Episode 5: Carnival Cannon Balls" | Ken Southworth | January 18, 1961 |
| 86 | 6 | "The Carnival Caper, Episode 6: Carnival Calamity" | Ken Southworth | January 21, 1961 |
| 87 | 7 | "The Carnival Caper, Episode 7: Carnival Tail-Spin" | Ken Southworth | January 22, 1961 |
| 88 | 8 | "The Carnival Caper, Episode 8: Carnival Jumbo" | Ken Southworth | January 23, 1961 |
| 89 | 9 | "The Carnival Caper, Episode 9: Carnival Jinx" | Ken Southworth | January 24, 1961 |
| 90 | 10 | "The Carnival Caper, Episode 10: Carnival Climax" | Ken Southworth | January 25, 1961 |

=== Season 10 ===
| No. overall | No. in season | Title | Directed by | Original release date |
|---|---|---|---|---|
| 91 | 1 | "The Peeky-Poo Caper, Episode 1: Flight of Fright" | Ken Southworth | January 28, 1961 |
| 92 | 2 | "The Peeky-Poo Caper, Episode 2: Slaughter in the Water" | Ken Southworth | February 8, 1961 |
| 93 | 3 | "The Peeky-Poo Caper, Episode 3: Curtains for Certain" | Ken Southworth | January 30, 1961 |
| 94 | 4 | "The Peeky-Poo Caper, Episode 4: Hobnob with the Mob" | Ken Southworth | January 31, 1961 |
| 95 | 5 | "The Peeky-Poo Caper, Episode 5: Winged Dilemma" | Ken Southworth | February 1, 1961 |
| 96 | 6 | "The Peeky-Poo Caper, Episode 6: Furor in the Sewer" | Ken Southworth | February 4, 1961 |
| 97 | 7 | "The Peeky-Poo Caper, Episode 7: Pawnshop Blues" | Ken Southworth | February 5, 1961 |
| 98 | 8 | "The Peeky-Poo Caper, Episode 8: Rock 'n' Roll Ride" | Ken Southworth | February 6, 1961 |
| 99 | 9 | "The Peeky-Poo Caper, Episode 9: Fall of Fear" | Ken Southworth | February 7, 1961 |
| 100 | 10 | "The Peeky-Poo Caper, Episode 10: Yo-Yo Wind-Up" | Ken Southworth | February 8, 1961 |

== Overseas broadcast ==
Japan

In Japan, it was dubbed into Japanese and broadcast on Fuji Television from May 15, 1962 to January 3, 1963 under the name "探偵スカット". The broadcast time was Monday to Saturday, 6:55 PM to 7:00 PM (JST). It was sponsored by Meiji Dairy Company. (now Meiji Co.) Narration was carried out by Junko Sumida. Q.T. was voiced by Kanta Kisaragi, and the narration was performed by Junko Sumida.
