= Gumbasia =

1953 American short film by Art Clokey

- Gumbasia, the first stop-motion clay animation film by Art Clokey
- Directed by: Art Clokey
- Written by: Art Clokey
- Produced by: Art Clokey
- Cinematography: Clokey Productions
- Edited by: Art Clokey
- Music by: "Don-Que-Dee" by Mel Powell
- Distributed by: Clokey Inc.
- Release date: September 2, 1953
- Running time: 3 minutes
- Country: United States

Gumbasia is a 3-minute animated short film released on September 2, 1953, the first clay animation produced by Art Clokey. He used the same technique to create the classic characters Gumby and Davey and Goliath.

== Production ==
Clokey created Gumbasia while a student at the University of Southern California under the direction of Slavko Vorkapić. In his father's garage, he worked the clay on a ping-pong table. The film is a surreal short of pulsating shapes and lumps of clay set to jazz music in a homage of Walt Disney's Fantasia.

Gumbasia was created in a style Vorkapić taught, called Kinesthetic Film Principles and described as "massaging of the eye cells". Based on camera movements and stop-motion editing, this provides much of the look and feel of Gumby films.

== See also ==
- Experimental animation
