= Minga (surname) =

Minga is a surname. Notable people with the surname include:

- Arben Minga (1959–2007), Albanian footballer
- Edson Minga (born 1979), Congolese-born Hong Kong footballer
- Jani Minga (1872–1947), Albanian educator
