= Gumby: The Movie =

1995 film by Art Clokey

- Theatrical release poster
- Directed by: Art Clokey
- Written by: Art Clokey; Gloria Clokey
- Produced by: Art Clokey; Gloria Clokey; Kevin Reher
- Starring: Charles Farrington; Art Clokey; Gloria Clokey
- Cinematography: Art Clokey
- Edited by: Marilyn McCoppen; Lynn Stevenson
- Music by: Jerry Gerber; Marco D'Ambrosio
- Production companies: Clokey Films; Premavision Productions
- Distributed by: Arrow Releasing Inc.
- Release date: October 4, 1995
- Running time: 90 minutes
- Country: United States
- Language: English
- Budget: $2.8 million
- Box office: $57,100

Gumby: The Movie (referred to as its on-screen title Gumby 1) is a 1995 American surrealist claymation adventure comedy film featuring Gumby.

The film was released on October 4, 1995, and received generally negative reviews from critics. The film was also a box office failure that grossed only $57,100 against its $2.8 million budget at the U.S. box office, although much of its financial shortcomings can be attributed to its limited theatrical rollout. It has since gained a cult following among fans of Gumby and was later moderately successful on home video sales.

== Plot ==
While looking for Gumby, Pokey accidentally annoys everyone at the fire station, then gets tangled up with Goo and Prickle on a giant slide, squishing them all into one big lump of clay. Once they're separated, Gumby shows up, intending to gather inspiration for his next concert. Fatbuckle and Thinbuckle round up the gang to head back to the farm-studio, but along the way, they discover farmers collapsed in the road—victims of the Blockheads' E-Z Loan scam that's threatening their farms. To help, Gumby and his band, The Clayboys, decide to put on a benefit concert. During practice, Pokey grows jealous of the time Gumby spends with the new band, while Goo finds a pearl beside Lowbelly, which Gumby takes to Professor Kapp to confirm its legitimacy.

At Gumby's first benefit concert, "Rockin' Arc Park," held at a park bandstand, the music jumbles Professor Kapp's thoughts and makes Lowbelly cry a massive pile of pearls. While Goo, Prickle, and Kapp don't notice, the nearby Blockheads see what's happening, snatch the pearls, and assume the dog makes them whenever he hears music. Later, Gumby and his friends celebrate at a small fast-food place, where Gumby meets Lucky Claybert and lands a deal to appear on TV. Meanwhile, the Blockheads swap Lowbelly for a robotic replica, hoping to use a concert recording to make him produce pearls—unaware he only does so when Gumby changes shapes. Two Gumby groupies, Tara and Ginger, follow the gang back to the farm studio and wait as Lucky stops by to finalize the deal with Gumby in his haystack office. Soon after, the Blockheads, disguised as a TV crew, nab the Clayboys and all their gear—except Gumby—and stash them in the back of their refrigerated truck. Tara and Ginger track the truck to the Blockheads' hideout, where they find Clayboy clones being made, including one programmed to capture Gumby once they realize they need him for the pearls.

Back at the farm, Lowbelly's strange behavior confuses everyone. He gets covered in manure whilst chasing Tilly, prompting them to wash him, while Gumby is quietly kidnapped. The dog sparks and melts into a metal skeleton, revealing he's been replaced. Gumby is cloned and locked up with the others. With their lineup complete, the Blockheads have the robot Clayboys performs, but Lowbelly still won't produce pearls. Tara and Ginger escape just as the Gumby clone is sent to capture Pokey, Prickle, and Goo. They intervene to save Gumby's friends, shut down the bot, and join Lucky to track down the band members. After defeating the Blockheads and rescuing Lowbelly, they begin thawing the band, but the Clayboys melt after being left alone and are taken to Professor Kapp, who revives them with sound waves.

Breaking free from their restraints, the Blockheads reactivate the Gumby clone and send it after Goo. Prickle sees this and warns Gumby, who faces off with the impostor. A wild chase through video cassettes drops them into a Knights of the Round Table movie. Gumby can't pull Excalibur from the stone, but the clone does, kicking off a sword fight as the uninterested knights look on. Gumby is sliced in half but escapes into Battle of the Nebulae, with the clone right behind. They clash with lightsabers; Gumby chops off the clone's hand but is cut again before getting away. In the end, he has his firefighter dad spray the robot with water, shorting it out and melting it. The other robots are destroyed, the Blockheads are trapped by Groobee, and Goo is saved.

Gumby makes it to his videotaping with Claybert, then announces at a picnic that he's starting a farm-focused loan company offering fair loans, with Claybert's help. As punishment, the Blockheads were forced to weed Gumby's garden. After a successful concert, Gumby and Pokey head back to outer space, feeling proud that their efforts saved the farms.

== Cast ==
- Dallas McKennon (credited as Charles Farrington) voices:
  - Gumby – The titular main protagonist
  - Professor Kapp: An exuberant scientist with a Ed Wynn-like voice.
  - Fatbuckle: a red man with a big belt (his name is a play on "Fatty" Arbuckle)
  - Lucky Claybert: A Groucho-like talent agent who makes a music video entitled "Gumbymania" (although it is officially known as "Take Me Away" in the credits)
  - Nobuckle: A New Jersey accented yellow man.
  - Gumby Robot: A robotic doppelganger of Gumby created by The Blockheads and the secondary antagonist.
- Art Clokey voices:
  - Pokey: A talking red horse and Gumby's best friend
  - Prickle: A yellow dinosaur with a Mel Blanc–like voice and a Midwestern accent
  - Gumbo: Gumby's firefighter father
- Gloria Clokey voices Goo: A blue flying mermaid
- Manny La Carruba voices Thinbuckle: A blue teenager with a thin belt
- Patti Morse (speaking voice)/Melisa Kary (singing voice) voices Tara: a light blue female, who initially starting out as Gumby's fan, before becoming his love interest at the climax of the film
- Alice Young voices Ginger: a yellow female and Tara's best friend
- Janet MacDuff voices Gumba: Gumby's mother
- Bonnie Rudolph voices Lowbelly: A skateboard-talented dog, who cries pearls every time he sees Gumby change shapes, and Lowbelly Robot: a robotic version created by The Blockheads to serve as a decoy while they try to exploit the Pearl crying abilities of the real one.
  - Bonnie also voices one of the Farm Ladies
- Ozzie Ahlers voices Radio Announcer
- Kirby Coleman is the lead singer for "This Way 'N That"
- Anthony McNulty voices Burnzy
- David Archer
- Lillian Nicol
- Rick Warren
- Stan Freberg (uncredited)
- Blockheads G and J: Two square-headed silent main antagonists, each with letters on both sides of their heads, who communicate using sign language
- Groobee: Gumby's pet bee
- Minga: Gumby's little sister. She makes a non-speaking cameo appearance at the end of the film

== Production ==
Production on the film was started in 1988 and was fully completed in 1992. Despite this, Premavision was unable to find a distributor for the film until three years later in 1995, when they finally found a small company named Arrow Releasing (not to be confused with Arrow Films) but the film was unable to reach an agreement for a wide release.

The musical score was composed by Jerry Gerber, who previously worked on the television series, and Marco D'Ambrosio. Additionally, Ozzie Ahlers produced the featured songs "Take Me Away", "Ark Park" and "This Way'n That". The lyrics for "Take Me Away" and "This Way'n That" were written by Gloria Clokey. Ahlers was also responsible for hiring frequent collaborator and Starship guitarist Craig Chaquico to play the electric guitar parts.

The film is dedicated to Sri Sathya Sai Baba.

== Reception and legacy ==
=== Box office ===
Gumby: The Movie was released on October 4, 1995, by Arrow Releasing, receiving a limited release in 21 theaters. Due to the film's limited release, the film was a significant box office failure that grossed just $57,100 against its $2.8 million budget.

=== Critical reception ===
On review aggregator Rotten Tomatoes, the film has an approval rating of 20% based on reviews from 5 critics, with an average rating of 3.8/10.

David Kronke of The Los Angeles Times described the screenplay as "tired and listless", and criticized the dialogue as unsophisticated and hastily assembled.

Barry Walters of the San Francisco Examiner wrote that "although the action is slow by contemporary wham-bam standards, the drama eventually picks up as the kooky plot complications pile up. But the pacing is episodic, and the nonstop whimsy gets to be overwhelming: Every few minutes, you can feel yourself anticipating even hoping for a commercial break." Edward Guthmann of the San Francisco Chronicle wrote that "it should have been silly, kitschy, self-spoofing fun, but instead has a sad, enervated quality and frequently inept results."

Common Sense Media rated the movie a two out of five stars, stating, "The animation in this feature film edition might feel old-fashioned and clumsy; the story bland and simplistic. It's slow going, not terribly funny, and it's repetitive. Still it has a quirky charm that kids respond to, especially the grown-up "kids" who are long-time fans and enjoy the memories that repeat viewings provide."

Several critics focused on the animation, particularly how it incorporated less advanced technology than films like Toy Story, Pocahontas (both 1995), and stop-motion features like The Nightmare Before Christmas (1993).

A positive review came from Marylynn Uricchio of the Pittsburgh Post-Gazette, who wrote that it "is nothing more than an elongated version of the TV episodes that run on Nickelodeon, but that's not a criticism. With Gumby, anything is a pleasure."

=== Home media ===
The film was released on home video on VHS by KidVision and Astral Home Video on December 26, 1995; it would be the former company's final release before becoming defunct. The next year, Warner Home Video released the film on VHS, which became a top-10 seller, selling about one million copies overall on this format in total. It was released on DVD by Classic Media on April 22, 2008. NCircle Entertainment released the film on Blu-ray on September 5, 2017.

RiffTrax released their own commentary of the film on May 28, 2021.

=== Cult following ===
The film also achieved a cult status among its fan base to the point where it received a 2007 remastered showing at the Tribeca Film Festival.
