= Gumby =

1957 American clay animation franchise

- Gumby in "Lost Treasure"
- Created by: Art Clokey
- Original work: Gumbasia (1953)
- Owner: Fox Entertainment
- Years: 1953–present

Films and television
- Film: Gumby: The Movie (1995)
- Short films: Gumbasia (1953); Adventures of Gumby: A Sample (1955)
- Television series: Howdy Doody (1955–1956); The Gumby Show (1956–1969); Gumby Adventures (1988)

Games
- Video game: Gumby vs. the Astrobots (2005)

Gumby is an American character and associated media franchise created by Art Clokey. He is a shape shifting green humanoid that is animated with claymation.

Gumby stars in two television series, the film Gumby: The Movie, and other media. Gumby immediately became an American cultural icon, spawning tributes, parodies, and merchandising.

== Overview ==
The Gumby franchise follows Gumby's adventures through different environments and historical eras via entering books. His primary sidekick is Pokey, an orange pony. His archnemeses are the Blockheads, a pair of silent, antagonistic, red humanoid figures with cube-shaped heads; one has the letter G on the side of his head, while the other has a J. Their creation was inspired by the trouble-making Katzenjammer Kids. Other characters include Prickle, a yellow fire-breathing dinosaur who sometimes styles himself as a detective with pipe and deerstalker hat like Sherlock Holmes; Goo, a flying blue shapeshifting mermaid who spits blue goo balls; Gumbo and Gumba, Gumby's parents; and Nopey, Gumby's dog whose entire vocabulary is the word "nope". The 1988 syndicated series added Gumby's sister Minga, mastodon friend Denali, and chicken friend Tilly.

== Characters ==
=== Main Characters ===
- Gumby: The cheerful, flexible green humanoid protagonist of the show who can change his shape and jump inside books.
- Pokey: Gumby's loyal best friend and sidekick, a wise-cracking orange (or red) pony.
- Prickle: A yellow, fire-breathing dinosaur/dragon who enjoys playing detective in a Sherlock Holmes hat and pipe.
- Goo: A flying, blue, shapeshifting mermaid who can turn into objects like Gumby and shoot blue goo balls.
- The Blockheads (G and J): The mischievous, red, cube-headed antagonists who cause trouble. They communicate with sign language as they're mostly silent.

=== Family and Pets ===
- Gumbo and Gumba: Gumby's loving parents. Gumbo is a fireman while Gumba is a housewife.
- Minga: Gumby's energetic little sister, added in the 1988 series.
- Nopey: Gumby's pet dog whose entire vocabulary is just the word "nope".
- Lowbelly: Gumby's second pet dog. He is able to turn his tears into pearls whenever he watches Gumby play music.
- Tilly: Gumby's pet chicken, introduced in the 1988 series.
- Groobee: Gumby's pet bee. He is able to build wooden cages around people and objects at lightning speed.
- Granny: Gumby and Minga's human grandmother and Gumba's mother. Introduced in the 1988 series.

=== Friends and Recurring Characters ===
- Professor Kapp: Gumby's go-to scientist and inventor.
- Denali: A friendly giant mastodon introduced in the 1988 series.
- Tara: Gumby's girlfriend from the movie.
- Henry and Rodgy: Robot characters from classic episodes.
- Dr. Zveegee: A recurring mad scientist villain.
- Fatbuckle, Thinbuckle, and Nobuckle: The members of the band The Clayboys in the movie.

== History ==
=== 1953–1969: Origins ===
Gumby was created by Art Clokey in the early 1950s after he finished film school at the University of Southern California (USC).

Clokey's first animated film was a 1953 three-minute student film titled Gumbasia, a surreal montage of moving and expanding lumps of clay set to music in a parody of Disney's Fantasia. Gumbasia was created in the "kinesthetic" style taught by Clokey's USC professor Slavko Vorkapić, described as "massaging of the eye cells". Much of Gumby's look and feel was inspired by this technique of camera movements and editing.

In 1955, Clokey showed Gumbasia to film producer Sam Engel, who encouraged him to develop his technique by animating figures into children's stories. On January 29, 1955, Clokey produced and filmed the first pilot episode starring Gumby, titled "Adventures of Gumby: A Sample", which never aired.

The name "Gumby" was derived from the muddy clay found at Clokey's grandparents' farm that his family named "gumbo". Gumby's appearance was inspired by a suggestion from Clokey's wife Ruth (née Parkander) that Gumby be based on the Gingerbread Man. Clokey saw the color green as both racially neutral and a symbol of life. Gumby's legs and feet were made wide to pragmatically ensure that the figure would stand erect during stop-motion filming. Gumby's slanted head was based on the hairstyle of Clokey's father, Charles Farrington, in an old photograph.

The pilot episode was seen by NBC executive Thomas Warren Sarnoff, who asked Clokey to make another one. The second episode, "Gumby on the Moon", became a hit when featured on Howdy Doody, so Sarnoff ordered a series in 1955 titled The Gumby Show. In 1955 and 1956, 25 11-minute episodes aired on NBC. In early episodes, Gumby's voice was provided by Ruth Eggleston, wife of the show's art director Al Eggleston, until 1957, when Dallas McKennon assumed the role. Al Eggleston also invented Pokey, the little orange pony who was Gumby's best friend and was introduced during the earliest episodes.

Because of its variety format, The Gumby Show features Clokey's animations plus interviews and games. During this time, the show had two successive hosts, Robert Nicholson and Pinky Lee.

In 1959, The Gumby Show entered syndication, and more episodes were produced in the 1960s. Production started in Hollywood and in 1960 moved to a larger studio in Glendora, California, where it remained until production ended in 1969. During this time, Gumby was primarily voiced by Norma MacMillan and occasionally by Ginny Tyler. The cartoon shorts introduced new characters, including a blue mermaid named Goo and a yellow dinosaur named Prickle.

Several sources claim that Dick Beals also voiced Gumby in the 1960s series. However, Beals refuted this claim in a 2001 interview.

=== 1982–1989: Revival ===
Beginning in 1982, Gumby was parodied by Eddie Murphy on Saturday Night Live. The sketches depict Gumby as an irascible, cigar-chomping celebrity who is highly demanding of the production executives. Whenever they refuse his demands, Gumby asserts his star status by saying "I'm Gumby, dammit!" in an exaggerated Jewish accent. According to Clokey's son Joseph, his father and he "thought Eddie was a genius in the way he played that character". Eddie Murphy's impersonation revived public interest in Gumby. In 1987, the original Gumby shorts were released on home video. In 1988, Gumby appeared in The Puppetoon Movie.

This renewed interest led to a new Gumby Adventures series of 99 seven-minute episodes, produced for television syndication in association with Lorimar-Telepictures in 1988. Dallas McKennon voices Gumby in the new adventures, in which Gumby and his pals travels beyond their toyland setting as a musical band. Gumby Adventures includes new characters, such as Gumby's little sister Minga, a mastodon named Denali and a chicken named Tilly.

The 1988 series includes the 1950s and 1960s shorts with rerecorded voices, and the original music was replaced by Jerry Gerber's synthesizer score. Legal issues prevented Clokey from renewing rights to the original Capitol Records production tracks.

=== 1990–2021: feature film and reruns ===
Starting in 1992, TV channels such as Nickelodeon and Cartoon Network aired reruns of Gumby episodes. In 1995, Clokey's production company produced an independently released theatrical film, Gumby: The Movie, as the character's first feature-length adventure, with John R. Dilworth, creator of Courage the Cowardly Dog, as animation consultant. In the film, the villainous Blockheads replace Gumby and his band with robots and kidnap their dog, Lowbelly. It contains homages to science-fiction films such as Star Wars, The Terminator and 2001: A Space Odyssey. In 1998, the Gumby episode "Robot Rumpus" was featured on Mystery Science Theater 3000.

On March 16, 2007, YouTube announced that all Gumby episodes would appear in their full-length form on its site, digitally remastered and with their original soundtracks. This deal also extended to other video sites, including AOL. In March 2007, KQED-TV broadcast an hour-long documentary titled Gumby Dharma in its Truly CA series. It details Clokey's life and work, and has new animation of Gumby and Pokey. For these sequences, animator Stephen A. Buckley voiced Gumby and Clokey voiced Pokey.

In 2012, MeTV began airing Gumby in its weekend morning animation block until the end of the year.

In 2014, the VOD service Kabillion broadcast Gumby.

=== 2022–present: Fox ownership ===
In February 2022, Fox Entertainment, the TV production division of the Murdoch family's Fox Corporation, announced it had acquired the Gumby intellectual property from the estate of Art's son, Joseph Clokey, encompassing all rights including "film, TV and streaming, consumer products, licensing, publishing, and all other categories", with plans to launch new series across linear and digital platforms, while adding to the classic Gumby material available on its free streaming platform Tubi. Before Fox took ownership of the series, Gumby made a cameo in the 17th season of The Simpsons in the episode "The Girl Who Slept Too Little".

In June 2024, two Gumby series were announced to be in the works: a 2D children's animated series titled Gumby Kids and an adult animated series. Both series were to be produced by Bento Box Entertainment.

On April 18, 2026, Gumby, voiced by Jim MacKenzie, paid tribute to Eddie Murphy during his honor of the AFI Life Achievement Award.

== Cast ==
- Ruth Eggleston: Gumby (1955–1956), Gumba (1955), additional voices
- Dallas McKennon: Gumby (1957, 1960–1964, 1987–1989, 1995), Pokey (1960–1969), Gumbo (1960), Prickle (1964–1969), Professor Kapp (1964–1988, 1995), Denali (1988), Nopey (1964–1969), Henry (1987 redubbed), Rodgy (1987 redubbed), additional voices
- Norma MacMillan: Gumby (1964–1969), Pokey (1967–1968), Goo (1964–1969), Gumba (1967–1968)
- Ginny Tyler: Gumby (1968–1969), Gumba (1957–1962), Granny (1960–1962), Witty Witch (1960–1962), additional voices
- Stephen A. Buckley: Gumby (1987–1991, 1996, 2007)
- Betty Hartford: Gumba (1956)
- Art Clokey: Pokey (1955–1988, 1995, 2007), Prickle (1964–1969, 1987–1989, 1995), Gumbo (1955–1989, 1995), additional voices
- Don Messick: Henry (1963), Rodgy (1963), additional voices
- Paul Frees: Professor Kapp (1963), Additional voices
- Gloria Clokey: Goo (1987–1989, 1995), Gumba (1987–1989)
- Janet MacDuff: Gumba (1988, 1995), Granny (1988), additional voices
- Holly Harman: Minga (1988), Tilly (1987–1989), additional voices
- Hal Smith: Prickle (1964–1969), Dr. Zveegee, Nopey, additional voices
- Dick Beals: Naughty Boy (1960)
- Pinky Lee: Host (1956)
- Bobby Nicholson: Scotty McKee (host) (1956–1967)

== Episodes ==
Season	Episodes	Originally released		
Season	Episodes	First released	Last released	Network
Pilots		September 2, 1953; January 29, 1955		NBC
1	43	May 1, 1956	November 9, 1956	NBC
2	87	January 1, 1960	July 9, 1968	Syndication
3	99	January 2, 1988	December 31, 1988	Syndication

== Reception and legacy ==
In 1985 a pizza chain featuring Gumby, "Gumby's Pizza & Wings," opened in Southwest Gainesville, Florida, near the University of Florida, and then expanded across the Southern, Midwestern, and Northeastern United States. Usually located near college campuses, they feature a signature dish named after Gumby's friend called "Pokey Stix."

In 1993, TV Guide named Gumby the best cartoon series of the 1950s in its issue celebrating 40 years of television.

Beginning in 1994, the Library of Congress used Gumby as a "spokescharacter" for Adventures into Books: Gumby's World, a traveling exhibition promoting the Center for the Book's national reading campaign from 1997 to 2000. By the end of the 1990s, Gumby and Pokey had also appeared in various commercials for Cheerios cereal, with Gumby voiced by Stephen A. Buckley.

On August 4, 2006, the Center for Puppetry Arts in Atlanta opened Art Clokey's Gumby: The First Fifty Years. This exhibition featured many of the original puppets and sets, along with screening of Clokey's films. This event was conceived by David Scheve of T.D.A. Animation and Joe Clokey of Premavision, and was one of several exhibits that opened around the country, celebrating the 50th anniversary of The Gumby Show. The children's book Gumby Goes to the Sun was also published that year to commemorate the anniversary. The book was originally created in the 1980s by Clokey's daughter, Holly Harman (who voiced Gumby's sister, Minga, in the 1988 series).

In 2007, the Gumby comic book series was nominated for two Eisner Awards, Best New Series and Best Publication for a Young Audience, and won the latter. A Gumby graphic novel titled Gumby: 50 Shades of Clay was released in 2017.

On October 12, 2011, a Google Doodle acknowledged Art Clokey's 90th birthday. It was composed of a toy block with a "G" and five clay balls in the Google colors. Clicking each ball revealed the Blockheads, Prickle, Goo, Gumby, and Pokey.

On December 21, 2019, Eddie Murphy reprised his role while hosting Saturday Night Live during a sketch on "Weekend Update".

== Merchandising ==
The video game Gumby vs. the Astrobots

The most prominent of Gumby merchandise is the bendable figure set by Lakeside Toys. Several single packs and multifigure sets were made by Jesco (later Trendmasters), and a 50th-anniversary collection. There are plush dolls, keychains, mugs, a 1988 Colorforms set, a 1995 Trendmasters playset, and a Kubricks set by Medicom. A tribute album, Gumby: The Green Album, produced by Shepard Stern, was released in 1989.

The Gumby images and toys are registered trademarks of Fox Entertainment. Premavision owned the distribution rights to the Gumby cartoons, having been reverted from previous distributor Warner Bros. Television in 2003, and had licensed the rights to Classic Media until September 30, 2012. At this time, Classic Media was officially acquired by DreamWorks Animation and branded as DreamWorks Classics, which became a subsidiary of NBCUniversal in 2016. As of April 2015, NCircle Entertainment owns home video and digital distribution rights to the cartoons.

=== Video game ===
In August 2005, the only video game featuring Gumby, Gumby vs. the Astrobots, was released by Namco for the Game Boy Advance. The plot follows the Blockheads and their cohorts, the Astrobots, capturing Pokey, Prickle, Goo, Gumbo, and Gumba and placing them in books. With his friends and parents in trouble, Gumby sets out to rescue them and defeat the Blockheads. The game is a sidescrolling platformer, where Gumby must navigate stages to reach the end, while avoiding enemies and pitfalls, and defeating a number of bosses from the game's various worlds. Gumby vs. the Astrobots received generally average reviews according to review aggregator Metacritic, with an average score of 63 out of 100, based on four reviews.

== In popular culture ==
Gumby was a recurring target of parody on Mad TV, appearing in several memorable stop-motion claymation sketches during the show's early seasons. In the sketch "Gumboy" in the 19th episode of the 1st season, a raunchy parody where a teenage Gumby (referred as "Gumboy") and Pokey (referred as "Poker") sneak into his dad's room and discover a Clayboy Mansion magazine. They end up visiting a clay Hugh Hefner, leading to chaotic adult-themed claymation antics. In the sketch "CLOPS" in the 22nd episode of the 2nd season, a long-running, recurring parody of the reality crime show COPS, featuring claymation toys. In the first "CLOPS" installment (which actually debuted in Season 1), Gumby is arrested alongside Santa Claus (from the 1964 television special Rudolph the Red-Nosed Reindeer) by Officer John Dough. In the sketch "Gumby Old Men" in the 21st episode of the 3rd season, a direct parody of the film Grumpy Old Men. It features elderly, embittered clay versions of Gumby and Pokey shouting obscenities, fighting over a female piece of clay named Ariel, and inflicting brutal comic violence on each other.

In the official mobile game Family Guy: The Quest for Stuff, featuring an unlockable character skin called Gummy Peter where Peter Griffin is entirely green, flexible, and slides around Quahog like a claymation figure.

In Robot Chicken, the series has regularly targeted Gumby with mature parody sketches. In the sketch "Hollywood Spotlight: The Incredible Hulk", a sketch features a teenage version of Marvel's Incredible Hulk working as Gumby's literal stunt double. In the sketch "Trial of the Blockheads", another sketch features a grim courtroom drama where Gumby's classic red, cube-headed rivals—the Blockheads—are put on trial for his murder.

In the Muppet Babies episode "The Great Muppet Cartoon Show", Miss Piggy demonstrates claymation by flattening Gonzo into a one-dimensional green clay figure shaped exactly like Gumby.

In The Real Ghostbusters episode "Station Identification", features a parody character named Gumbo, a hyper-violent, heavily armed mashup of Gumby and Rambo (from Rambo).

In Mystery Science Theater 3000, the show famously featured and ruthlessly riffed on the classic 1950's Gumby short "Robot Rumpus" in a 1998 episode, mocking the chaotic logic of the clay animation.

In The Pee-wee Herman Show, way back in his 1981 HBO special, Pee-wee Herman had a completely naked, vintage plastic Gumby toy sitting on his desk as a running background prop.

In Home Improvement, in a 1994 episode, the main character Tim Taylor gets confused about terminology and claims that "Gumbo" is just a "flexible green guy that rides Pokey".

In ALF, the sarcastic alien mentions Gumby during the classic episode "Weird Science".

At the end of the "Clay Day" segment from the Gravity Falls episode "Little Gift Shop of Horrors", Soos turns into Gumby. He also says, "Holy toledo!", which was the catchphrase of Pokey.

Pokey appears in the Mad sketch "Lone Rango", a mashup of The Lone Ranger and Rango.

Gumby and Pokey starred in a memorable Honda's Happy Honda Days commercial in 2015, and a General Mills Frosted Cheerios ad where Pokey deadpans, "Hey, we're clay!"

== See also ==
- List of films featuring clay animation
- Morph
- Semper Gumby
- Davey and Goliath
