= Davey and Goliath =

American animated television series

- Title card
- Genre: Animation; Children's; Christian; Educational
- Created by: Art Clokey; Ruth Clokey; Dick Sutcliffe
- Starring: Dick Beals; Norma MacMillan; Hal Smith; Paul Frees; Nancy Wible; Ginny Tyler
- Theme music composer: Martin Luther
- Opening theme: "A Mighty Fortress Is Our God"
- Composers: John Seely; William Loose; Spencer Moore
- Country of origin: United States
- Original language: English
- No. of seasons: 5
- No. of episodes: 66 (+ 7 specials)

Production
- Running time: 15 minutes
- Production companies: Clokey Productions; United Lutheran Church in America (1961); Lutheran Church in America (1962-1973); Evangelical Lutheran Church in America (2004)

Original release
- Network: First-run syndication
- Release: February 25, 1961 – March 7, 1964
- Release: September 11, 1971 – February 24, 1973
- Release: December 19, 2004

Davey and Goliath is an American Christian clay-animated children's television series, whose central characters were created by Art Clokey, Ruth Clokey, and Dick Sutcliffe and which was produced first by the United Lutheran Church in America and later by the Lutheran Church in America. The show was aimed at a youth audience and generally dealt with issues such as respect for authority, sharing, and prejudice. Eventually, these themes included serious issues such as racism, death, religious intolerance, and vandalism.

Each 15-minute episode features the adventures of a boy named Davey Hansen and his "talking" dog Goliath (although only Davey and the viewer can hear him speak) as they learn the love of God through everyday occurrences. Many of the episodes also feature Davey's parents, John and Elaine, and his younger sister, Sally, as well as Davey's friends: Jimmy, Teddy, and Nathaniel in earlier episodes and Jonathan, Nicky, and Francisco in later ones.

In general, the characters find themselves in situations that have to be overcome by placing their faith in God. While the show is explicitly faith-based, it has no content specifically about the Lutheran Church, which made broadcasters more comfortable with the idea of an overtly religious mainstream children's show. The only reference to Lutherans in the show was the theme song, an instrumental version of "A Mighty Fortress Is Our God", and the Luther rose displayed in the opening theme and end credits.

Following Clokey's success with the Gumby series, Davey and Goliath premiered in syndication on February 25, 1961, as a Saturday feature, and lasted until 1965. By May 1961, it was reported that "Millions of children in cities and towns across the United States and Canada are talking about two new television stars, 'Davey and Goliath'."

Davey's friends Nathaniel (in the 1960s episodes) and Jonathan (in the 1970s episodes) were some of the first black characters to appear as friends of a television show's white lead character.

After its initial run, several 30-minute holiday-themed episodes were created in the late 1960s. The series then resumed with some new characters in 1971 and continued until 1973. In 1975, a final 30-minute summer episode was created. In 2004, Joe Clokey and the Evangelical Lutheran Church in America, the successor body to the LCA, produced a new special, Davey and Goliath's Snowboard Christmas.

== History ==
=== Ordering the series ===
In 1958, Franklin Clark Fry, president of the United Lutheran Church in America (ULCA), put aside $1 million to fund production of a future television program for children. Soon after, the ULCA contracted with Clokey Productions, Inc., headed by Gumby creators Art and Ruth Clokey, to create a new children’s show: Davey and Goliath. Scripts were written by children’s-book author Nancy Moore in consultation with the church; Moore went on to pen several episodes of the CBS Radio Mystery Theater in the 1970s and early '80s.

The ULCA and Art Clokey teamed up to make the first Davey and Goliath episode in 1960, called "Lost in a Cave", which would be the first shown in syndication in 1961. In this premiere episode, the figures were entirely clay (with some latex/rubber clothing showing visible seams) and the scenery was also mostly clay. The early voices included Hal Smith (who did a number of voices, including Davey's father), Dick Beals (who was Davey's voice), and Ginny Tyler (who did the voice of Sally and Davey's mother). These three did many other voices, as well.

After making "Lost in a Cave" in 1960, Clokey made "The Wild Goat", "Stranded on an Island", and "The Winner" in early 1961. In these episodes, the clay figures were clothed with real cloth, and more model buildings and trees were added, making the episodes look somewhat more realistic. In 1961, the series of these four episodes began airing free on local television stations nationwide, primarily Big Three (ABC, CBS, and NBC) network affiliates and independent stations, as well as noncommercial educational stations. Occasionally, two or more stations in the same market aired the show, at several times. Many stations ran these episodes leading into network Saturday-morning lineups. Other stations ran them in religious Sunday-morning lineups between other evangelists' programs. By 1964, the show was airing in over 90% of U.S. television markets.

=== 30 minute episodes ===
In 1965, Davey and Goliath returned to television when a 30-minute Christmas special called "Christmas Lost and Found" was aired. The episode was more overtly religious in nature and distanced itself from traditional Christmas figures such as Santa Claus and Rudolph, with religious Christmas songs included. This also was the last episode featuring Dick Beals as the voice of Davey.

In 1967, three 30-minute holiday specials were aired: "Happy Easter" in March, "Halloween Who-Dun-It" in October, and "The New Year Promise" in December. By then, the background music changed to an unknown music library, one that was also used in the Gumby episodes produced during that time. Davey was closer to junior high-school age and was voiced by Norma MacMillan. "Happy Easter" confronted the death of a loved one, as Davey's beloved grandmother dies suddenly (off-camera) within hours of a fun-filled visit.

=== Davey and Goliath's Snowboard Christmas ===
After an almost 30-year hiatus, Davey and Goliath were next seen as part of a Mountain Dew soda commercial in 2001, with the royalties from the commercial used to fund the production of the 2004 Christmas special entitled Davey and Goliath's Snowboard Christmas. The holiday special addressed both religious and racial diversity, as Davey demonstrates his snowboarding expertise to two friends: Sam, a Jewish boy, and Yasmeen, a Muslim girl. During the course of the show, they get caught in an avalanche and end up in a cave. Goliath goes for help, while Davey and his new friends find out that they really are not all that different. The three children wind up learning of each other's holiday celebrations: Jewish Hanukkah, Christian Christmas, and Muslim Eid.

== Television airings ==
The program had become a fixture on Saturday and/or Sunday mornings on TV stations (both religious and secular) across the country during the 1960s and '70s. In the '80s, commercial stations began gradually dropping the series. Religious stations picked it up in many markets and ran it in their blocks of Christian children's programs. By 1990, only a handful of commercial stations still aired the series.

The show continued to air on CatholicTV Network until late in 2009, on Tri-State Christian Television also until 2010, and was still aired on a few local Christian television stations.

On cable, the Odyssey Network ran the entire series commercial-free from 1992 until 1999. Since the network's rebranding as the Hallmark Channel in 2001, it has only aired a few of the holiday specials with several commercial breaks, including the Snowboard Christmas special made in 2004. In 2008, iTunes began offering episodes as free downloads. By December of that year, more than 20 episodes had been made available. Nowadays, the episodes cost 99 cents each.

Until the beginning of October 2018, the series was shown on Trinity Broadcasting Network (TBN) on Saturday afternoons. During the week, it was televised on the TBN-owned Smile of a Child network, which is carried on digital subchannels of TBN affiliates.

== Parodies ==
- He Was Once (1989) is a surrealist, live-action short film by Mary Hestand that features the characters from Davey & Goliath. The plot centers around Davey encountering a bear in the city, but when he tells his parents, they do not believe him, and he is punished. The short includes dream sequences of an Oedipal (though not explicit) nature and scenes of corporal punishment.
- Adult Swim's Moral Orel is a darker, adult-oriented parody of Davey and Goliath. Though it is stylistically and thematically similar, the show's creator, Dino Stamatopoulos, claims Moral Orel had its genesis as a parody of Leave It to Beaver.
- MADtv spoofed Davey and Goliath in their 14th episode with "Davey and Son of Goliath", alluding to the Son of Sam serial killer, who claimed a talking dog had instructed him to kill.
- The Simpsons featured a short, clay-animated segment titled "Gravey and Jobriath". Gravey is portrayed as a religious extremist building a pipe bomb to destroy Planned Parenthood.

== List of episodes ==
| Season | Episodes | Originally released | |
| Season | Episodes | First released | Last released |
|---|---|---|---|
| 1 | 13 | February 25, 1961 | November 4, 1961 |
| 2 | 13 | September 8, 1962 | February 23, 1963 |
| 3 | 13 | September 14, 1963 | March 7, 1964 |
| 4 | 13 | September 11, 1971 | March 4, 1972 |
| 5 | 14 | June 17, 1972 | February 24, 1973 |
| Specials | 7 | January 1, 1965 | December 19, 2004 |

=== Season 1 (1961) ===
| Series # | Title | Original airdate |
|---|---|---|
| 1 | "Lost in a Cave" | February 25, 1961 |
| 2 | "Stranded on an Island" | March 4, 1961 |
| 3 | "The Wild Goat" | March 11, 1961 |
| 4 | "The Winner" | March 18, 1961 |
| 5 | "The New Skates" | September 9, 1961 |
| 6 | "Cousin Barney" | September 16, 1961 |
| 7 | "The Kite" | September 23, 1961 |
| 8 | "The Mechanical Man" | September 30, 1961 |
| 9 | "The Time Machine" | October 7, 1961 |
| 10 | "On the Line" | October 14, 1961 |
| 11 | "The Polka-Dot Tie" | October 21, 1961 |
| 12 | "All Alone" | October 28, 1961 |
| 13 | "The Pilgrim Boy" | November 4, 1961 |

=== Season 2 (1962–63) ===
| Series # | Title | Original airdate |
|---|---|---|
| 14 | "The Silver Mine" | September 8, 1962 |
| 15 | "Ten Little Indians [A.K.A. Ten Pin Alley]" | September 22, 1962 |
| 16 | "Boy Lost" | October 6, 1962 |
| 17 | "A Sudden Storm" | October 20, 1962 |
| 18 | "The Bell Ringer" | November 3, 1962 |
| 19 | "Not for Sale" | November 17, 1962 |
| 20 | "The Shoemaker" | December 1, 1962 |
| 21 | "The Runaway" | December 15, 1962 |
| 22 | "Officer Bob" | December 29, 1962 |
| 23 | "The Parade" | January 12, 1963 |
| 24 | "The Dog Show" | January 26, 1963 |
| 25 | "Down on the Farm" | February 9, 1963 |
| 26 | "The Waterfall" | February 23, 1963 |

=== Season 3 (1963–64) ===
| Series # | Title | Original airdate |
|---|---|---|
| 27 | "Happy Landing" | September 14, 1963 |
| 28 | "Editor-in-Chief" | September 28, 1963 |
| 29 | "Man of the House" | October 12, 1963 |
| 30 | "Bully Up a Tree" | October 26, 1963 |
| 31 | "The Big Apple" | November 9, 1963 |
| 32 | "The Bridge" | November 30, 1963 |
| 33 | "The Gang [A.K.A. The Jickets]" | December 14, 1963 |
| 34 | "The Lemonade Stand" | December 28, 1963 |
| 35 | "Hocus Pocus" | January 11, 1964 |
| 36 | "Good Neighbor" | January 25, 1964 |
| 37 | "A Dillar, A Dollar" | February 8, 1964 |
| 38 | "Rags and Buttons" | February 22, 1964 |
| 39 | "Jeep in the Deep" | March 7, 1964 |

=== Season 4 (1971–72) ===
| Series # | Title | Original airdate |
|---|---|---|
| 40 | "The Stopped Clock" | September 11, 1971 |
| 41 | "Who, Me?" | September 25, 1971 |
| 42 | "If at First, You Don't Succeed..." | October 9, 1971 |
| 43 | "Finder's Keepers" | October 23, 1971 |
| 44 | "Kookaburra" | November 13, 1971 |
| 45 | "The Caretakers" | November 27, 1971 |
| 46 | "The Hard Way" | December 11, 1971 |
| 47 | "Rickety Rackety" | December 25, 1971 |
| 48 | "Help" | January 8, 1972 |
| 49 | "Boy in Trouble" | January 22, 1972 |
| 50 | "The Greatest" | February 5, 1972 |
| 51 | "Blind Man's Bluff" | February 19, 1972 |
| 52 | "Who's George?" | March 4, 1972 |

=== Season 5 (1972–73) ===
| Series # | Title | Original airdate |
|---|---|---|
| 53 | "The Family of God" | June 17, 1972 |
| 54 | "Six-Seven-Six-Three" | September 9, 1972 |
| 55 | "The Zillion-Dollar Combo" | September 23, 1972 |
| 56 | "Upside Down and Backwards" | October 7, 1972 |
| 57 | "Louder, Please" | October 21, 1972 |
| 58 | "Ready or Not" | November 4, 1972 |
| 59 | "Kum-Bay-Ah" | November 18, 1972 |
| 60 | "Whatshisname?" | December 2, 1972 |
| 61 | "Pieces of Eight" | December 16, 1972 |
| 62 | "Chicken" | December 30, 1972 |
| 63 | "Doghouse Dreamhouse" | January 13, 1973 |
| 64 | "Good Bad Luck" | January 27, 1973 |
| 65 | "The Watchdogs" | February 10, 1973 |
| 66 | "Come, Come to the Fair" | February 24, 1973 |

=== Specials (1965–1975, 2004) ===
| Series # | Title | Original airdate |
|---|---|---|
| 1 | "Christmas Lost and Found" | December 25, 1965 |
| 2 | "Happy Easter" | March 26, 1967 |
| 3 | "Halloween Who-Dun-It?" | October 29, 1967 |
| 4 | "The New Year Promise" | December 31, 1967 |
| 5 | "School: Who Needs It?" | August 22, 1971 |
| 6 | "To the Rescue" | June 29, 1975 |
| 7 | "Davey and Goliath's Snowboard Christmas" | December 19, 2004 |

== See also ==
- List of Christian animations
- VeggieTales
