= Art Clokey =

American animator (1921–2010)

- Clokey in 1967
- Born: Arthur Charles Farrington; October 12, 1921; Detroit, Michigan, U.S.
- Died: January 8, 2010 (aged 88); Los Osos, California, U.S.
- Education: Pomona College; Miami University; University of Southern California
- Occupations: Animator; director; producer; screenwriter; voice actor
- Years active: 1953–1995
- Notable work: Creator of Gumby and Davey and Goliath
- Spouses: Ruth Clokey (m. 1948; div. 1966) Gloria Clokey (m. 1976; died 1998)
- Children: 2
- Family: Joseph W. Clokey (father)
- Awards: Inkpot Award (2006)

Arthur Charles Clokey (né Farrington; October 12, 1921 – January 8, 2010) was an American animator, director, producer, screenwriter and voice actor. He was a pioneer in the popularization of stop-motion clay animation, best known as the creator of the character Gumby and the original voice of Gumby's sidekick, Pokey. Clokey's career began in 1953 with a film experiment called Gumbasia, which was influenced by his professor, Slavko Vorkapich, at the University of Southern California. Clokey and his wife Ruth subsequently came up with the clay character Gumby and his pony pal Pokey, who first appeared in the Howdy Doody Show and later got their own series The Adventures of Gumby, from which they became a familiar presence on American television. The characters enjoyed a renewal of interest in the 1980s when American actor and comedian Eddie Murphy parodied Gumby in a skit on Saturday Night Live.

Clokey's second-most famous production is the duo of Davey and Goliath, funded by the Lutheran Church in America (now the Evangelical Lutheran Church in America).

Clokey founded the company Premavision (which has manufacturing subsidiary, Prema Toy Company) around his Gumby and Pokey franchise.

== Early life ==
Arthur Charles Farrington was born in Detroit on October 12, 1921. After his parents' divorce when he was about 8, he lived with his father; when Arthur was 9, his father was killed in an automobile accident. Rejoining his mother in California, the boy was banished by her new husband and placed in a children's home. At about 11, Arthur was adopted by Joseph Waddell Clokey, a well-known composer of sacred and secular music.

At The Webb Schools in Claremont, young Clokey came under the influence of teacher Ray Alf, who took students on expeditions digging for fossils and learning about the world around them. Clokey later studied geology at Pomona College, where his new father Joseph was an organist, before leaving in 1943 to join the Air Corps as a reconnaissance photographer during World War II. He graduated from his father's alma mater, Miami University, in 1948.

== Clay animation ==
Art Clokey also made a few highly experimental and visually inventive short clay animation films for adults, including his first student film Gumbasia (produced in 1953 and released in 1955), the visually rich Mandala (1977)—described by Clokey as a metaphor for evolving human consciousness—and the equally bizarre The Clay Peacock (1959), an elaboration on the animated NBC logo of the time. Consisting of animated clay shapes contorting to a jazz score, Gumbasia so intrigued Samuel G. Engel, then president of the Motion Pictures Producers Association, that he financed the pilot film for what became Clokey's The Gumby Show (1957). The title Gumbasia was in homage to Walt Disney's Fantasia.

In 1987, Clokey provided the voice for the figure Pokey in Arnold Leibovit's film The Puppetoon Movie, and voiced him thereafter.

The Clokeys are credited with the clay-animation title sequences for the 1965 beach movies Dr. Goldfoot and the Bikini Machine and How to Stuff a Wild Bikini. His son, Joe Clokey, continued the Davey and Goliath cartoon in 2004. In March 2007, KQED-TV broadcast the hour-long documentary Gumby Dharma as part of their Truly CA series.

In 1995, Clokey directed and co-wrote (with his second wife, Gloria) Gumby: The Movie, which ultimately served as his final work. The movie which had a limited release was a significant box office failure and was widely panned by critics, although it saw modest success on home media, going on to sell more than a million copies on home media, cementing itself as a cult classic.

== Death and legacy ==
Clokey died in his sleep on January 8, 2010, at age 88, at his home in Los Osos, California, after suffering recurrent bladder infections.

On October 13, 2011, a day after what would have been Clokey's 90th birthday, Google paid homage to his life and works with an interactive logo doodle in the style of his clay animations, including Gumby, produced by Premavision Studios.

== Filmography ==
- Gumbasia (produced in 1953 and released in 1955) (animator, director, producer and writer)
- The Gumby Show (1956–1968) as Pokey (voice; also animator, director, producer and writer)
- Davey and Goliath (1961–1964, 1971–1975) (director, producer and writer)
- The Clay Peacock (1975) (director, producer and camera operator)
- Mandala (1977) (director, producer and camera operator)
- The Puppetoon Movie (1987) as Pokey (voice)
- Gumby Adventures (1988) as Worm and Pokey (voice; also director, producer and head writer)
- Gumby: The Movie (1995) as Pokey, Prickle, and Gumbo (Gumby's Dad) (voice; also director, producer, script writer and animator)
