= List of animated television series created for syndication =

This is a list of American animated television programs that were originally created and produced exclusively for first-run syndication.

== 1950s ==
=== 1950–59 ===
- Crusader Rabbit (August 1, 1950 – December 1, 1959) (the first produced animated television series)
- The Adventures of Paddy the Pelican (September 11 – October 13, 1950)
- Colonel Bleep (September 21, 1957 – May 9, 1960) (the first animated series made and filmed in color)
- The Adventures of Spunky and Tadpole (September 6, 1958 – September 9, 1961)
- The Huckleberry Hound Show (September 29, 1958 – December 1, 1961)
- The Quick Draw McGraw Show (January 1, 1959 – October 20, 1961)
- Clutch Cargo (March 9, 1959 – 1960)
- Bucky and Pepito (September 8, 1959 – March 22, 1960)
- Undetermined
  - Adventures of Pow Wow (1956)
  - Bozo: The World's Most Famous Clown (1958–1962)
  - Capt'n Sailorbird (1959)
  - Mel-O-Toons (1959 – October 1960)
  - New Adventures of the Space Explorers (1959)
  - The Space Explorers (1959)

== 1960s ==
=== 1960 ===
- The Gumby Show (January 1, 1960 – July 9, 1968) (season 2 only)
- Popeye the Sailor (June 10, 1960 – April 23, 1963)
- Courageous Cat and Minute Mouse (September 14, 1960 – November 30, 1962)
- Q.T. Hush (September 24, 1960 – February 8, 1961)
- The Nutty Squirrels Present (September 1960 – 1961)
- Mister Magoo (November 7, 1960 – February 2, 1962)

=== 1961 ===
- The Dick Tracy Show (January 1, 1961 – January 1, 1962)
- The Yogi Bear Show (January 30, 1961 – January 6, 1962)
- The New Adventures of Pinocchio (February 6, 1961 – 1961)
- Tales of the Wizard of Oz (September 2, 1961 – December 1961)
- Undetermined
  - The Underseas Explorers (1961)

=== 1962 ===
- Out of the Inkwell (August 6, 1962 – November 4, 1963)
- The Hanna-Barbera New Cartoon Series (September 3, 1962 – August 26, 1963)
- Undetermined
  - Barney Google and Snuffy Smith (1962–1964)
  - Beetle Bailey (1962–1964)
  - Krazy Kat (1962–1964)
  - Space Angel (1962–1964)

=== 1963 ===
- The Mighty Hercules (September 1, 1963 – May 1, 1966)
- Astro Boy (Note: Animation from Japan.) (September 7, 1963 – August 20, 1965)
- Undetermined
  - The Funny Company (1963)
  - Hergé's Adventures of Tintin (1963–1971)
  - Rod Rocket (1963)

=== 1964 ===
- The Magilla Gorilla Show (January 15, 1964 – December 30, 1967)
- The Peter Potamus Show (September 16, 1964 – October 23, 1965)

=== 1965 ===
- The Astronut Show (August 23, 1965 – 1967)
- Sinbad Jr. and His Magic Belt (September 11, 1965 – May 28, 1966)
- Roger Ramjet (September 11, 1965 – October 31, 1965)
- DoDo, The Kid from Outer Space (September 24, 1965 – March 7, 1970)
- The New 3 Stooges (October 1965 – September 1966)
- Undetermined
  - 8th Man (1965–1966)
  - JOT (1965–1981)
  - The Mighty Mr. Titan (1965)

=== 1966 ===
- Gigantor (January 1966 – 1967)
- Batfink (April 21, 1966 – October 4, 1967)
- The Marvel Super Heroes (September 5 – December 2, 1966)
- Kimba the White Lion (September 1966 – 1977)
- Laurel and Hardy (September 10, 1966 – March 25, 1967)
- Undetermined
  - Arthur! and the Square Knights of the Round Table (1966–1968)

=== 1967 ===
- Rocket Robin Hood (January 2, 1967 – 1969)
- Johnny Cypher in Dimension Zero (March 15, 1967 – September 6, 1968)
- The Abbott and Costello Cartoon Show (September 9, 1967 – June 1, 1968)
- Yogi Bear & Friends (September 16, 1967 – 1968)
- Undetermined
  - The Amazing 3 (1967)
  - Marine Boy (1966–1967)
  - Max, the 2000-Year-Old Mouse (1967)
  - Prince Planet (1967–1968)
  - Speed Racer (1967–1968)

=== 1969 ===
- Winky Dink and You (1969–1973) (color revival series to the CBS live-action/animation TV series of the same name)

== 1970s ==
=== 1970–79 ===
- Spider-Man (March 22 – June 14, 1970) (season 3 only)
- Festival of Family Classics (January 1, 1972 – November 26, 1973)
- Wait Till Your Father Gets Home (September 12, 1972 – October 8, 1974)
- Fred Flintstone and Friends (October 3, 1977 – September 1, 1978)
- Battle of the Planets (September 12, 1978 – May 12, 1980)
- Star Blazers (September 17, 1979 – December 4, 1984)
- Undetermined
  - Hanna–Barbera's World of Super Adventure (1978–1984)
  - Tales of Magic (1977–1988)
  - The Groovie Goolies and Friends (1978–1979)
  - The Wonderful Stories of Professor Kitzel (1972)

== 1980s ==
=== 1980–84 ===
- Force Five (September 8, 1980 – December 4, 1981)
- Spider-Man (September 12, 1981 – March 30, 1982)
- G.I. Joe: A Real American Hero (September 12, 1983 – November 20, 1986)
- Inspector Gadget (September 12, 1983 – February 1, 1986)
- He-Man and the Masters of the Universe (September 26, 1983 – November 21, 1985)
- My Little Pony (April 14, 1984 – September 23, 1987)
- Rainbow Brite (June 27, 1984 – July 24, 1986)
- The Adventures of Fat Albert and the Cosby Kids (September 1, 1984 – August 10, 1985) (final season only)
- Heathcliff (September 5, 1984 – January 12, 1988)
- Challenge of the GoBots (September 8, 1984 – December 13, 1985)
- Voltron (September 10, 1984 – November 18, 1985)
- The Transformers (September 17, 1984 – November 11, 1987)

=== 1985 ===
- Robotech (March 4 – June 28, 1985)
- Galtar and the Golden Lance (September 2, 1985 – January 20, 1986)
- Yogi's Treasure Hunt (September 6, 1985 – March 25, 1988)
- ThunderCats (September 9, 1985 – September 29, 1989)
- Jayce and the Wheeled Warriors (September 9, 1985 – April 27, 1986)
- She-Ra: Princess of Power (September 9, 1985 – December 2, 1986)
- Care Bears (September 14, 1985 – November 23, 1985)
- Sectaurs (September 14 – October 12, 1985)
- Paw Paws (September 15, 1985 – February 2, 1986)
- The Jetsons (September 16, 1985 – November 12, 1987) (season 2–3 only)
- M.A.S.K. (September 30, 1985 – November 26, 1986)
- Jem (October 6, 1985 – May 2, 1988)
- Bigfoot and the Muscle Machines (October 6, 1985 – January 12, 1986)
- Robotix (October 6, 1985 – January 12, 1986)
- Undetermined
  - Tranzor Z (1985)

=== 1986 ===
- Ulysses 31 (April – September 1986)
- Centurions (April 7 – December 12, 1986)
- Captain Harlock and the Queen of a Thousand Years (September 1 – November 28, 1986)
- Ghostbusters (September 8 – December 5, 1986)
- SilverHawks (September 8 – December 5, 1986)
- Defenders of the Earth (September 8, 1986 – May 1, 1987)
- Popples (September 13, 1986 – July 18, 1987)
- The Adventures of the Galaxy Rangers (September 14 – December 11, 1986)
- The New Adventures of Jonny Quest (September 14, 1986 – March 1, 1987)
- Karate Kommandos (September 15–19, 1986)
- Rambo: The Force of Freedom (September 15 – December 26, 1986)
- Inhumanoids (June 29 – October 5, 1986; September 21 – December 14, 1986)
- Dennis the Menace (September 22, 1986 – March 26, 1988)
- The Glo Friends (September 23, 1986 – March 17, 1987)
- Potato Head Kids (September 24, 1986 – February 25, 1987)
- MoonDreamers (September 25, 1986 – January 8, 1987)
- The Adventures of Teddy Ruxpin (December 24, 1986 – October 23, 1987)
- Undetermined
  - Astro Boy (1986)
  - Macron 1 (1986–1987)

=== 1987 ===
- Lady Lovely Locks and the Pixietails (April 4 – August 15, 1987)
- Maple Town (April 13 – 24, 1987)
- Bionic Six (April 19 – November 12, 1987)
- Sky Commanders (July 5 – September 27, 1987)
- The Comic Strip (September 7 – December 4, 1987)
  - The Mini-Monsters (1987–1988)
  - Street Frogs (1987–1988)
  - Karate Cat (1987–1988)
  - TigerSharks (1987–1988)
- The Snorks (September 12, 1987 – March 15, 1989) (season 3–4 only)
- BraveStarr (September 14, 1987 – February 24, 1988)
- Dinosaucers (September 14 – December 11, 1987)
- Saber Rider and the Star Sheriffs (September 14, 1987 – September 2, 1988)
- The Real Ghostbusters (September 15, 1987 – December 10, 1987) (season 2 only)
- DuckTales (September 18, 1987 – November 28, 1990)
- Sylvanian Families (September 18 – December 11, 1987)
- Starcom: The U.S. Space Force (September 20 – December 13, 1987)
- Visionaries: Knights of the Magical Light (September 20 – December 13, 1987)
- Beverly Hills Teens (September 21 – December 18, 1987)
- Spiral Zone (September 21 – December 18, 1987)
- Teenage Mutant Ninja Turtles (December 14, 1987 – March 29, 1991) (moved to CBS in 1990)

=== 1988 ===
- Gumby Adventures (January 9 – December 31, 1988)
- Police Academy (September 10, 1988 – September 2, 1989)
- The New Yogi Bear Show (September 12 – November 11, 1988)
- Denver, the Last Dinosaur (September 12 – November 22, 1988)
- Fantastic Max (September 17, 1988 – January 21, 1990)
- Dino-Riders (October 1 – December 31, 1988)
- RoboCop: The Animated Series (October 1 – December 17, 1988)
- COPS (October 5, 1988 – February 20, 1989)
- Undermined:
  - Care Bears (1988)

=== 1989 ===
- The Further Adventures of SuperTed (January 31 – April 25, 1989)
- G.I. Joe: A Real American Hero (September 2, 1989 – January 20, 1992) (sequel to the former 1985–1986 G.I. Joe series)
- The Super Mario Bros. Super Show! (September 4 – December 1, 1989)
- The Legend of Zelda (aired as part of The Super Mario Bros. Super Show!) (September 8 – December 1, 1989)
- Ring Raiders (September 16 – October 14, 1989)
- Chip 'n Dale: Rescue Rangers (September 11, 1989 – November 19, 1990)
- Paddington Bear (December 2, 1989 – January 21, 1990)
- Undetermined
  - Vytor: The Starfire Champion (1989)
  - Maxie's World (1989-1990)

== 1990s ==
=== 1990 ===
- The Power Team (aired as part of Video Power) (1990–1992)
- Midnight Patrol: Adventures in the Dream Zone (September 1 – November 24, 1990)
- Barnyard Commandos (September 4, 1990 – 1991)
- TaleSpin (September 7, 1990 – August 8, 1991)
- Disney's Adventures of the Gummi Bears (September 10, 1990 – February 22, 1991) (season 6 only)
- The New Adventures of He-Man (September 10 – December 7, 1990)
- The Adventures of Don Coyote and Sancho Panda (September 16, 1990 – December 8, 1991)
- Tiny Toon Adventures (September 17, 1990 – February 24, 1992) (seasons 1-2 only)
- Wake, Rattle, and Roll (September 17, 1990 – January 18, 1991)
- Widget (September 29, 1990 – December 12, 1991)
- Undetermined
  - Dragon Warrior (1990)

=== 1991 ===
- Darkwing Duck (September 6, 1991 – May 20, 1992)
- Bucky O'Hare and the Toad Wars (September 8 – December 1, 1991)
- Young Robin Hood (September 15 – December 8, 1991)
- Mr. Bogus (September 28, 1991 – November 29, 1993)
- James Bond Jr. (September 30, 1991 – March 2, 1992)
- Undetermined
  - Saban's Adventures of the Little Mermaid (1991)

=== 1992 ===
- The Adventures of T-Rex (January 6, 1992 – January 23, 1993)
- Goof Troop (September 5 – December 4, 1992)
- Conan the Adventurer (September 13, 1992 – November 23, 1993)
- King Arthur and the Knights of Justice (September 13, 1992 – December 12, 1993)
- Stunt Dawgs (September 28, 1992 – June 28, 1993)
- Bonkers (September 4, 1993 – February 23, 1994)
- The Pirates of Dark Water (November 8, 1992 – May 8, 1993) (season 2 only)
- Twinkle, the Dream Being (December 5, 1992 – June 25, 1993)
- Undetermined
  - Saban's Around the World in Eighty Dreams (1992–1993)
  - Saban’s Gulliver’s Travels (1992–1993)

=== 1993 ===
- The Bots Master (September 1, 1993 – May 1, 1994)
- Mighty Max (September 1, 1993 – December 2, 1994)
- Adventures of Sonic the Hedgehog (September 6 – December 3, 1993)
- Double Dragon (September 12, 1993 – December 4, 1994)
- Hurricanes (September 12, 1993 – 1994)
- The Pink Panther (September 13, 1993 – April 12, 1995)
- Biker Mice from Mars (September 18, 1993 – February 24, 1996)
- Exosquad (September 18, 1993 – November 3, 1994)
- The New Adventures of Speed Racer (September 18 – December 11, 1993)
- Undetermined
  - Stone Protectors (1993)

=== 1994 ===
- Mutant League (July 2, 1994 – February 24, 1996)
- Aladdin (September 5, 1994 – February 28, 1995) (season 2 only)
- Street Sharks (September 7, 1994 – May 29, 1995)
- BattleTech: The Animated Series (September 10 – December 10, 1994)
- Mega Man (September 11, 1994 – January 19, 1996)
- The Baby Huey Show (September 17, 1994 – December 9, 1995)
- Phantom 2040 (September 18, 1994 – March 3, 1996)
- Iron Man (September 24, 1994 – February 24, 1996)
- Fantastic Four (September 24, 1994 – February 24, 1996)
- Creepy Crawlers (October 4, 1994 – March 30, 1996)
- Gargoyles (October 24, 1994 – May 15, 1996)

=== 1995 ===
- The Shnookums and Meat Funny Cartoon Show (January 2 – March 27, 1995)
- Ronin Warriors (June 26 – August 17, 1995)
- The Lion King's Timon & Pumbaa (September 8, 1995 – November 25, 1996) (only halves of the first two seasons)
- Gadget Boy & Heather (September 9, 1995 – March 16, 1996)
- Princess Gwenevere and the Jewel Riders (September 9, 1995 – December 12, 1996)
- Skysurfer Strike Force (September 10, 1995 – October 26, 1996)
- Sailor Moon (September 11, 1995 - December 22, 1998) (DIC Entertainment series only)
- Tenko and the Guardians of the Magic (September 11 – November 6, 1995)
- Action Man (September 23, 1995 – March 30, 1996)
- G.I. Joe Extreme (September 24, 1995 – February 21, 1997)
- Darkstalkers (September 30 – December 30, 1995)
- Littlest Pet Shop (October 16 – December 8, 1995)
- Undetermined
  - Happy Ness: The Secret of the Loch (1995)
  - Highlander: The Animated Series (1995–1996)
  - Monster Mania (1995)
  - Ultraforce (1995)

=== 1996 ===
- Saban's Adventures of Oliver Twist (February 1, 1996 – February 12, 1997)
- Flash Gordon (September 1996 – 1997)
- Quack Pack (September 3 – November 28, 1996)
- Mighty Ducks: The Animated Series (September 6, 1996 – January 17, 1997)
- Captain Simian & the Space Monkeys (September 7, 1996 – June 21, 1997)
- The Mask: Animated Series (September 7, 1996 –March 29, 1997) (season 2 only)
- Samurai Pizza Cats (September 9 – November 1, 1996)
- Eagle Riders (September 9 – December 6, 1996)
- Dragon Ball Z (September 13, 1996 – May 23, 1998) (seasons 1-2 only) (Saban Entertainment series only)
- The Richie Rich Show (September 14 – December 7, 1996)
- Beast Wars: Transformers (September 16, 1996 – March 7, 1999)
- All Dogs Go to Heaven: The Series (September 21, 1996 – November 6, 1998)
- Bruno the Kid (September 23, 1996 – May 26, 1997)
- Cave Kids (September 29 – November 17, 1996)
- Vor-Tech: Undercover Conversion Squad (October 2 – December 25, 1996)
- Undetermined
  - Dragon Flyz (1996–1997)
  - Sky Dancers (1996–1997)
  - The Legend of Sarmoti: Siegfried & Roy (1996)
  - The Why Why Family (1996)

=== 1997 ===
- Extreme Dinosaurs (September 1 – December 24, 1997)
- Extreme Ghostbusters (September 1 – December 8, 1997)
- 101 Dalmatians: The Series (September 1, 1997 – March 4, 1998) (season 2 only)
- Van-Pires (September 14 – December 7, 1997)
- Mummies Alive! (September 15 – November 25, 1997)
- The Mr. Men Show (September 15, 1997 – June 6, 1999)
- The New Adventures of Zorro (September 20, 1997 – December 12, 1998)
- The Wacky World of Tex Avery (September 29, 1997 – December 2, 1997)

=== 1998 ===
- Hercules (August 31, 1998 – March 1, 1999) (season 1 only)
- RoboCop: Alpha Commando (September 7, 1998 – February 3, 1999)
- Jumanji (September 8, 1998 – March 11, 1999) (season 3)
- Pokémon (September 8, 1998 – November 20, 1998) (season 1 only)
- Voltron: The Third Dimension (September 12, 1998 – February 19, 2000)
- The Lionhearts (September 19 – December 12, 1998)
- Monkey Magic (September 19 – December 12, 1998)
- Undetermined
  - Pocket Dragon Adventures (March 15, 1998 – 1999)
  - War Planets (1998-1999)

=== 1999 ===
- Roswell Conspiracies: Aliens, Myths and Legends (August 27, 1999 – June 3, 2000)
- Sonic Underground (August 30, 1999 – October 22, 1999)
- Monster Rancher (August 30, 1999 – October 7, 2001)
- Roughnecks: Starship Troopers Chronicles (August 30, 1999 – April 3, 2000)

== 2000s ==
- Tama and Friends (2001–2002)
- Heavy Gear (2001-2002)
- Poochini (September 1, 2002 – March 1, 2003)
- Sabrina's Secret Life (November 10, 2003 – February 3, 2004)
- Auto-B-Good (January 17, 2005 – February 27, 2006)
- The Zula Patrol (September 4, 2005 – June 18, 2008)
- Ribert and Robert's Wonderworld (September 4, 2005 – November 30, 2008)
- Magical DoReMi (September 10, 2005 - May 2, 2008) (season 1 only) (4Kids Entertainment series only)
- Danger Rangers (September 5, 2005 – December 26, 2006)
- Trollz (October 3 – November 8, 2005)
- Raggs (February 4, 2008 – February 18, 2009)

== 2010s ==
- Peep and the Big Wide World (January 4, 2010 – October 14, 2011) (seasons 4-5 only)
- King of the Hill (May 3–6, 2010) (last 4 episodes of season 13)
- Space Racers (May 2 – October 24, 2014) (season 1 only)
- Mack & Moxy (February 5 – April 22, 2016)

== 2020s ==
- Mia & Codie (Since January 2, 2025)
- Vegesaurs (Since April 1, 2025)
- Skillsville (Since February 1, 2026)

== Films and specials ==
=== 1960s–70s ===
- The Night Before Christmas (December 1968)
- Christmas Is (December 1970)
- A Christmas Story (December 9, 1972)
- Easter Is (April 1974)
- The City That Forgot About Christmas (December 1974)
- Freedom Is (July 1976)

=== 1980 ===
- Yogi's First Christmas (November 22, 1980)
- The Christmas Raccoons (December 20, 1980)

=== 1982–3 ===
- The Raccoons on Ice (November 21, 1982)
- Peter and the Magic Egg (March 23, 1983)
- The Magic of Herself the Elf (July 30, 1983)
- The Charmkins (October 25, 1983)
- The Raccoons and the Lost Star (November 5, 1983)

=== 1985 ===
- Poochie (June 22, 1984)
- Robotman & Friends (February 11, 1985)
- The Pound Puppies (October 26, 1985)
- Star Fairies (October 26, 1985)

=== 1986 ===
- Christmas Every Day (December 1986)

=== 1987 ===
- A Mirthworm Masquerade (April 11, 1987)
- Meet Julie (September 1987)
- Yogi's Great Escape (September 20, 1987)
- Barbie and the Rockers: Out of this World (September 27, 1987)
- Barbie and the Sensations: Rockin' Back to Earth (September 27, 1987)
- The Jetsons Meet the Flintstones (October 18, 1987)
- Scooby-Doo Meets the Boo Brothers (November 15, 1987)
- Yogi Bear and the Magical Flight of the Spruce Goose (November 22, 1987)

=== 1988 ===
- Top Cat and the Beverly Hills Cats (March 20, 1988)
- The Good, the Bad, and Huckleberry Hound (May 15, 1988)
- Rockin' with Judy Jetson (September 18, 1988)
- Scooby-Doo and the Ghoul School (October 16, 1988)
- Scooby-Doo! and the Reluctant Werewolf (November 13, 1988)
- Yogi and the Invasion of the Space Bears (November 20, 1988)

=== 1989 ===
- Little Golden Book Land (March 24, 1989)
- Mirthworms on Stage (July 20, 1989)
- X-Men: Pryde of the X-Men (September 16, 1989) (pilot for an unproduced series)

=== 1990–97 ===
- Cartoon All-Stars to the Rescue (April 21, 1990)
- The Magic Trolls and the Troll Warriors (1991)
- Super Trolls (1992)
- P. J. Sparkles (November 26, 1992) (failed pilot)
- Peppermint Rose (November 26, 1992)
- Battletoads (November 27, 1992) (failed pilot)
- The Moo Family Holiday Hoe-Down (November 29, 1992)
- Nick & Noel (November 25, 1993)
- Bubsy: What Could Possibly Go Wrong? (November 28, 1993) (failed pilot)
- The Moo Family Stall of Fame (November 28, 1993)
- The Legend of the Hawaiian Slammers (November 25, 1994)
- The Bears Who Saved Christmas (December 8, 1994)
- A Hollywood Hounds Christmas (December 16, 1994)
- Bad Baby (December 31, 1997)

== See also ==
- Weekday cartoon
