= First Night (disambiguation) =

First Night is a New Year's Eve celebration.

First Night may also refer to:

- First Night (TV series), 1963
- "First Night" (The Professionals), a 1978 episode of the television series
- 1st Night, 2010 comedy film
- First Night, a minisode in the Doctor Who spin-off Night and the Doctor
- "The First Night", 1998 song by Monica
- "First Night" (song), song on Survivor's 1984 Vital Signs album
- "First Night", a song on Lyrical Lemonade's 2024 All Is Yellow album
- La Primera Noche, 2003 Colombian film, English title The First Night
- The First Night (film), a 1927 American silent film
- First Night (film), a 1937 British drama film
- First Night 2013 with Jamie Kennedy, a 2012–2013 television special

Uncapitalized, it may refer to:

- Consummation, first night of a marriage in many cultures
  - Droit du seigneur, supposed right of a lord to brides for the prima nocta
- Premiere of a theatrical show, musical composition, film, etc.

== See also ==
- First Knight, 1995 film
