= Jane Shaw (disambiguation) =

Jane Shaw (born 1963) is a British historian and Anglican priest.

Jane Shaw may also refer to:

- Jane Shaw (Scottish author) (1910–2000), Scottish author of books and short stories for children and young adults
- Jane S. Shaw, American free-market environmentalist, editor and journalist

== See also ==
- Jane Shore (disambiguation)
