= Jane Shore (disambiguation) =

Jane Shore (c. 1445 – c. 1527) was the mistress of Edward IV of England.

Jane Shore may also refer to:

- Jane Shore (poet), American poet and professor of English
- Jane Shore (play), a 1714 play by Nicholas Rowe based on the life of Jane Shore, the mistress of Edward IV
- Jane Shore (1911 film)
- Jane Shore (1915 film), a British silent historical film adapted from the 1714 play The Tragedy of Jane Shore
- Jane Shore (1922 film)

== See also ==
- Jane Shaw (disambiguation)
