= Rapsittie Street Kids: Believe in Santa =

2002 animated Christmas TV special

- Promotional image featuring characters from the special in a hand-drawn style
- Written by: Colin Slater; Trisha Koury-Stoops
- Directed by: Colin Slater
- Starring: Walter Emanuel Jones; Mark Hamill; Paige O'Hara; Nancy Cartwright; Jodi Benson; Grey DeLisle; Debra Wilson; Clint Howard; Jack Angel; April Winchell
- Music by: Kevin Saunders Hayes
- Country of origin: United States
- Original language: English

Production
- Executive producers: James De Luca; Chris Rose
- Producers: Colin Slater; J. R. Horsting; Nancy Cartwright
- Editor: Dave Edison
- Running time: 42 minutes
- Production companies: J Rose Productions; Wolf Tracer Studios
- Budget: $650,000

Original release
- Network: Broadcast syndication
- Release: December 2002

Rapsittie Street Kids: Believe in Santa is a 2002 American animated musical Christmas special. One of two films produced by Colin Slater's Wolf Tracer Studios, the special features the voices of Walter Emanuel Jones, Mark Hamill, Jodi Benson, Paige O'Hara and Nancy Cartwright. Believe in Santa tells the story of how suburban boy Ricky Rodgers celebrates Christmas after the death of his mother.

Believe in Santa was broadcast throughout December in broadcast syndication in the top 100 markets, though its most prevalent distribution was through The WB 100+ Station Group, which broadcast The WB over cable and broadcast stations in smaller markets (it did not air on The WB itself as part of its primetime schedule). The special is notable for its production history and overwhelmingly negative reception. Almost every aspect of the special was panned, including its low-quality, uncanny computer animation and amateur plot, though the voice acting received some minor praise. After a small number of broadcasts during the 2002 holiday season, the special was never officially released on home video and faded into obscurity. A copy of the special was secured from producer and director Colin Slater and uploaded to the video-sharing site Vimeo in 2015, where it garnered a small online cult following.

== Plot ==
Ricky Rodgers is a poor preteen boy who lives on Rapsittie Street with his great-grandmother Fran. When his class's Christmas gift exchange is coming up, Ricky wishes to give his teddy bear, a gift from his late mother, to his classmate, Nicole, an affluent, self-centered girl who believes that anything she deems "cheap" is not worth her time. When Ricky gives her the bear after school, she angrily rejects it and throws it away, causing Ricky to run away upset.

After writing a letter to Santa and being teased by Nicole for doing so, Ricky heads to mail off the letters, only to drop one of them, resulting in the wind blowing it to Nicole's house. Nicole reads and learns that, alongside a video game console, Ricky asked Santa to bring toys to all the kids in his class, including Nicole, and that his teddy bear holds sentimental value. Remorseful, Nicole, alongside her best friend Lenee and Ricky's friend Smithy, attempts to find the bear to no avail. After looking through the local garbage man's basement, Smithy suggests the bear may be in the local dump. Upon arrival, the trio is ambushed by guard dogs and class bullies Todd, Tug, and Zeke. Smithy attracts the dogs' attention by throwing his sandwich at Todd, prompting them to attack the bullies as the bullies run away. Smithy finds the bear on top of a car, and Nicole returns it to Ricky, who explains that it was a gift for her and that friendship, like the bear, means a lot to him.

In a subplot, after Nicole makes fun of Lenee for still believing in Santa, Lenee begins to question her belief in Santa Claus, which leaves her depressed. Her father restores her spirits, allowing not only Lenee to continue believing in Santa but also Nicole to believe in Santa, after Fran confesses that she never stopped believing in Santa, much to the pleasure of Nicole's parents. Nicole and Lenee's family, Ricky and Fran, and Smithy all spend Christmas at Lenee's house. Smithy and the others notice Santa with his sleigh and reindeer flying outside the house, and they all proclaim their belief in Santa.

== Voice cast ==
- Walter Emanuel Jones as Ricky Rodgers
- Mark Hamill as Eric
- Paige O'Hara as Nicole
- Nancy Cartwright as Todd
- Jodi Benson as Lenee
- Grey DeLisle as Jenna
- Debra Wilson as Great Grandma Fran Rodgers
- Clint Howard as Tug
- Jack Angel as Robert
- April Winchell as Nana
- Eddie Driscoll as Smithy
- Sarina C. Grant as Ms. Parmington
- Robert Machray as Principal
- Sherry Weston as Peg
- Andi Matheny as Debbie
- J.R. Horsting as Zeke

== Production ==
Believe in Santa was animated using 3D Choreographer, a consumer-grade product not designed for professional production, resulting in an aesthetic described by critics as "hideous".

According to Kennedy Rose, daughter of Chris Rose, one of the special's executive producers, production began in 2002, when her father and a friend formed J Rose Productions. Wolf Tracer Studios, a computer animation company also known for producing the 2004 direct-to-video feature Wolf Tracer's Dinosaur Island (also starring Hamill) and the full-length animated pilot Not Quite Right by Crappco, was hired to animate the film. Rose states that her father trusted the animators to the point where he spent around $500,000 USD on production and never checked in on their work. His first time seeing the animation was on the night the movie premiered on television. Rapsittie Street Kids: Believe in Santa was animated in 3D Choreographer–a consumer-grade CGI animation program–with effects provided by Adobe Photoshop and Adobe After Effects.

== Soundtrack ==
A soundtrack was released sometime in late 2002. It features five songs, most of which are vocally performed in the film.

1. "Ricky's Rap" (performed by Walter Emanuel Jones; composed by Kevin Hayes)
2. "Christmas Chimes" (composed by Jason Ebs)
3. "Best Kid in the World" (performed by Paige O'Hara; composed by James Deluca and Greg Iovine)
4. "Believe in Santa" (performed by Jodi Benson; composed by James Deluca and Greg Iovine)
5. "Through a Child's Eye" (performed by Paige O'Hara and Peabo Bryson; composed by Colin Slater, Barry Coffin and James Deluca)

== Release ==
=== Broadcast ===
As part of its syndicated distribution after its WB 100+ airing, it aired on KFVE-TV in Hawaii on December 7, 2002, WKFT in Raleigh (at the time an independent station, already under the process of selling to Univisión) on December 13, 2002, WSBK-TV in Boston on December 14, 2002, WABC-TV in New York and KABC-TV in Los Angeles on December 21, 2002, WFMJ-TV in Youngstown on December 22, 2002, continuing to air through the United States in larger markets in syndication until Christmas Day (when then-CBS-owned WFRV-TV in Green Bay aired it), though its top-100 market distribution outside of the smaller-market WB 100+ chain cannot be fully ascertained. After the 2002 holiday season, the film eventually fell into obscurity. It was found in 2015 by Dycaite, the founder of the Lost Media Wiki, a website dedicated to documenting lost media, and was uploaded to Vimeo.

In December 2020, an article on Polygon revealed extensive insight into the making of Rapsittie Street Kids, with interviews with members of the production team and Debra Wilson.

== Reception and legacy ==
Rapsittie Street Kids: Believe in Santa has become infamous among fans of bad films. Ever since it aired on television, it received extremely negative reviews from critics and audiences, and has been repeatedly noted for its "hideous" and ugly computer animation and bizarre production history, though the ensemble voice cast received some praise. It also gained popularity for when the great grandmother spoke as her dialogue came out incoherent.

== See also ==
- List of television shows notable for negative reception
