= List of television shows notable for negative reception =

This list includes a number of television shows that are notable for negative critical reception.

== Criteria ==
Factors that can reflect poorly on a television series include inherently poor quality, lack of budget, rapid cancellation, very low viewership (especially when paired with heavy promotion), offensive content, and negative impact on other series on the same channel. Multiple outlets have produced lists ranking the "worst" television series, including TV Guide, Entertainment Weekly and Mail Online. TV Guide published lists in 2002 and 2010, each of which had contemporary shows near the top of the list.

The following is a list of television series notable for negative reception — i.e. shows that are considered to be the "worst of all time" by critics, network executives, and viewers.

This list also includes non-fictional programs (as in the case of sporting events, news broadcasts and talk shows).

== Animated shows ==
All six full episodes of The Adventures of Paddy the Pelican, shown chronologically

The Adventures of Paddy the Pelican
Created and directed by Sam Singer, who is most famously known for very low-budget cartoons. Only six animated episodes of this series were produced, all bearing the date 1950, making it one of the first ever efforts at a made-for-television cartoon (which would not become commonplace until the late 1950s); the characters were originally from a local TV puppet show on Chicago's WENR-TV that began airing in 1950. It is exceedingly rare, but has gained some fame for appearing on Jerry Beck's "Worst Cartoons Ever". Two episodes of this show have appeared on DVD, but Jerry Beck states that he has not found any evidence that it was aired on TV. The show received a 1.4/10 rating on IMDb. This show is known for its seemingly unfinished nature, making use of looped pencil tests, a single voice actor, and general low-budget problems.
Allen Gregory
The Fox series was generally panned by critics and was canceled after 7 episodes. Chris Swanson of WhatCulture gave the first episode a rating of 0.5 out of 5, stating that he was "seriously disappointed" by the episode. Robert Bianco of USA Today also gave the episode a negative review, calling it "nasty and brutish", and "rarely funny". Metacritic has an overall review of 40% for the show.
The Brothers Grunt
Created by Danny Antonucci, who would go on to create Ed, Edd n Eddy, The Brothers Grunt premiered on MTV in August 1994 as an attempt to capitalize on the network's earlier success of Beavis and Butt-Head. The show was canceled after seven months and derided by critics and viewers for its gross-out content. Kenneth R. Clark of the Chicago Tribune wrote that MTV "created the most repulsive creatures ever to show up on a television screen". Charles Solomon of the Los Angeles Times deemed it a "sophomoric half-hour that leaves the viewer longing for the refined good taste of Alice Cooper". The Boston Globe called the show "moronic", while Steve Hall of The Indianapolis Star commented: "Compared to this ... Beavis and Butt-Head looks like a masterpiece of social satire". Jean Prescott of The Pantagraph, in 1999, cited The Brothers Grunt as an "animation disaster". Authors William Beard and Jerry White called the series a "failure". Writer David Hofstede included the show among his selection of "The 100 Dumbest Events In Television History" in 2004: "Given the ... grotesque appearance of the characters, it's not surprising that the series didn't last".
Bucky and Pepito
This 1959 syndicated series has been criticized for its very poor production quality and racial stereotyping. It was produced by Sam Singer, who is referred to as "the Ed Wood of animation" by Jerry Beck for his very low-budget and generally ill-reviewed style. The show was described by Fast Company technology editor Harry McCracken as setting "a standard for awfulness that no contemporary TV cartoon has managed to surpass". Author Alvin H. Marill wrote that the show "managed to set TV animation back to the early crude days", and castigated Pepito—who was voiced by white actor Dallas McKennon — as "pure Mexican stereotype—from the huge sombrero that covered his eyes to [his] slow, lazy ways ... mentioned in the show's theme song". Writer David Perlmutter described Bucky and Pepito as being "racially troubling" and having "very poor animation and cliché-ridden writing". Media historian Hal Erickson called Pepito "non-politically correct [and] stereotyped" and the show's animation "arguably the worst of any TV cartoon of the 1950s". One episode was featured on Beck's Cartoon Brew webseries Cartoon Dump in 2007.
Caillou
This Canadian children's series aired from 1997 to 2010 and then in the United States on PBS from 2000 to 2021. Although Caillou initially received positive reviews during its original run, it has drawn heavy viewer criticism in the years following its debut on TV, notably for the title character's mean-spirited behaviour and reputation for throwing tantrums starting in the first and second seasons; this resulted in four episodes of the show being banned by PBS Kids. Tristin Hopper of National Post, in 2017, called the show "quite possibly the world's most universally reviled children's program". Caroline Bologna of the Huffington Post published a 2017 feature of viewer responses titled "This is How Much People Hate Caillou". Comic Book Resources called the show "the Nickelback of cartoons", and the Detroit Free Press deemed the character "the worst role model to come out of Canada since Justin Bieber". Distractify remarked in 2020, "If you've managed to go your entire life without watching an episode of Caillou, you're one of the lucky ones". The Arizona Republic and The A.V. Club rated Caillou among the worst children's shows.
Father of the Pride
Father of the Pride was a 2004 primetime computer-animated series that centered around a family of white lions whose eponymous patriarch stars in a Siegfried & Roy show in Las Vegas. Pre-release publicity was affected by Roy Horn being attacked by a tiger during a 2003 performance while the show was in production. Despite DreamWorks Animation marketing the show to younger audiences, NBC was forced to return $50,000 in funding to the Family Friendly Programming Forum after airing a series of promos during the 2004 Summer Olympics that showed characters making sexual references, and the program itself was panned by critics for its crude adult-oriented humor. The Las Vegas Sun commented: "Father of the Pride isn't suitable for children. Unless, of course, you consider references to sex acts and bestiality OK for younger ears". The combination of pre-release issues, negative reviews and poor ratings led to the show's cancellation after only thirteen episodes. Newsday named Father of the Pride one of the "worst shows of the 21st century", and The Daily Beast rated it among NBC's "most embarrassing flops of the last decade". Chris Longridge of Digital Spy described the show in 2017 as a "catastrophic misjudgment," and that the incident involving the tiger attack on Horn "didn't help" the show.
The Problem Solverz
This series was created for Cartoon Network by Ben Jones, co-founder of art collective Paper Rad. It received largely negative reviews, with writers of entertainment-related publications criticizing the visual style and writing. Rob Owen writing for the Pittsburgh Post-Gazette called the style reminiscent of Atari 5200 video games and wrote that viewers could "thank" or "blame" Jones for his creation. For the magazine Variety, Brian Lowry disregarded the series as uninteresting and challenging to watch, the visuals and sounds weird for weirdness' sake. Emily Ashby of Common Sense Media defined the series as misguided, its stories as undeveloped, and its visual style as unappealing. The Weekly Alibi's Devin D. O'Leary gave the show a more positive review, acknowledging the style as Paper Rad's own and found the writing more solid than that of Adult Swim's programming for which it could be mistaken. The jokes were not instantly funny according to O'Leary, but the visual style combined with the writing would provide amusement for Paper Rad's existing fans.
Ren & Stimpy "Adult Party Cartoon"
The Ren & Stimpy Show creator John Kricfalusi rebooted his original 1991 series for the relaunch of The National Network as Spike TV, as part of its new adult animation block. Ren & Stimpy "Adult Party Cartoon" premiered in June 2003 and contained significantly more vulgar content than its predecessor, which resulted in only three of six ordered episodes being aired by the network. Rob Owen of the Pittsburgh Post-Gazette described it as "just plain gross. ... They don't pay me enough to watch cartoon characters eating snot". Charles Solomon of the Los Angeles Times criticized the show as "'adult' only in the sense that you wouldn't want kids watching them". Tucson Weekly and Exclaim! both labeled it "disastrous". DVD Talk praised the show's animation, "but the weak stories epitomize empty, heavy-handed shock value". Matt Schimkowitz of Splitsider opined that the show's intended audience was "the 16-year-olds who grew up on the [original] show and are ready to handle such hilarious topics as spousal abuse and eating boogers". Comic Book Resources, in 2018, called it "perhaps the most hated animated reboot ever". The negative reaction to the show tainted Kricfalusi's reputation and resulted in a 2016 pitch for a Ren & Stimpy feature film being rejected by Paramount Pictures. Billy West, who voiced Stimpy in the original series, had turned down Kricfalusi's offer to reprise the part in Adult Party Cartoon: "It would have damaged my career. It was one of the worst things I ever saw".
ThunderCats Roar
A second revival of the original 1980s ThunderCats cartoon, created by Victor Courtright and Marly Halpern-Graser. The show first aired on February 22, 2020, and ended on December 5, 2020, after only one season of 52 episodes. The show was widely panned by fans of the original show, receiving a "1.9/10" score on IMDb. It was seen as a "wild departure" from previous ThunderCats iterations and was "hailed as absolute trash" even before airing. Reviewers noted that "many of the jokes land with a painful thud" and that the "divisive art shift... is actually the least of the problems with the show's visuals." Some criticism also targeted an episode of Teen Titans Go! called "Teen Titans Roar!" that seemingly mocked ThunderCats Roar critics, with fans viewing it as the show's creators being "defensive" and not caring about established fans. Raven Dubique-Ashton of Screen Rant, in a retrospective review, opined that Roar "did so badly that it threatened the integrity of the franchise as a whole," while holding out hope that the upcoming live-action movie could allow the franchise to "recover from its devastating 2020 failure".
Velma
An adult-oriented spin-off of the popular Scooby-Doo media franchise, with the title character voiced by comedian Mindy Kaling, this HBO Max cartoon received overwhelmingly negative reviews from its audiences, and later became one of the lowest-rated television shows on IMDb, receiving a "1.3/10" rating. On Rotten Tomatoes, Velma's first season holds a critic score of 38%, with the consensus stating that it "doesn't have the first clue for how to turn its clever subversion into engaging fun." Asyia Iftikhar of PinkNews noted in her reflection of audience reception that the show had been "accused of perpetuating stereotypes against South Asian women, criticised for poor attempts at self-aware comedy and slammed for losing the essence of what people love about the Scooby Doo gang". Wired's Amos Barshad wrote that while there were likely still reactions of a racist and homophobic nature targeting the show, the main complaints were for it addressing diversity issues in a "flat, one-note manner", and that the portrayal of Velma's sexuality had divided fans. Darren Franich of Entertainment Weekly gave the show a C, describing it as a "self-aware slog" and "so extra it's minus". Richard Roeper of the Chicago Sun-Times gave it two out of four stars and stated that "at times the humor is smart and spot-on, but it quickly becomes exhausting. It's as if a team of very clever scribes gathered in a writers' room and recorded everything they said – and then shoehorned all of it into the series". Joshua Alston of Variety wrote the show is "irreverent to a fault", extolling most of the humor but stating it could belong to any other comedy series. He also felt the Mystery Inc. gang was "really unpleasant".

== Live-action children's shows ==
Barney & Friends
Ranking 50th on the TV Guide 2002 list of worst television shows in American history, Barney & Friends has been widely criticized for a lack of educational value, as well as for being repetitive.
The show is often cited as a contributing factor to the perceived sense of entitlement seen in millennials, who grew up watching the show. One specific criticism is:

His shows do not assist children in learning to deal with negative feelings and emotions. As one commentator puts it, the real danger from Barney is "denial: the refusal to recognize the existence of unpleasant realities. For along with his steady diet of giggles and unconditional love, Barney offers our children a one-dimensional world where everyone must be happy and everything must be resolved right away."

Barney & Friends has been subject to a barrage of vicious and often dark anti-Barney humor and vitriol since its debut in 1992 (as was the 1988 direct-to-video Barney and the Backyard Gang). Barney, and the intense backlash it drew, were the subject of the 2022 documentary miniseries I Love You, You Hate Me, a name partially taken from a schoolyard mockery of Barney's signature song. Media theorist W. J. T. Mitchell said in his book, The Last Dinosaur Book, that "Barney is on the receiving end of more hostility than just about any other popular cultural icon I can think of".
Minipops
This 1983 Channel 4 show featured children between the ages of eight and twelve singing contemporary pop songs, often dressed and made up to resemble the original artists. The programme made many adult viewers uncomfortable when some of the juvenile singers imitated the provocative styles of adult performers. One performance by eight-year-old performer Joanna Fisher sparked outrage when, while performing the Sheena Easton song "9 to 5", she sang the lyrics "Night time is the right time/We make love". Despite the show's popularity, the resulting controversy caused Minipops to be canceled after only six episodes. John Naughton of The Radio Times named Minipops the second-worst UK television show in history in 2006. The Daily Telegraph, in 2019, called Minipops an "all-round televisual travesty".
New Monkees
A first-run syndicated series that ran for 13 episodes in 1987 in an attempt to reboot the hit 1960s sitcom The Monkees, New Monkees drew harsh negative reception and death threats to its stars. With its creators initially only planning to invoke the Monkees name as a working title, the original band members strongly objected to the series using their band's name without their permission.
Tomorrow's Pioneers
Flavorwire called the Hamas-produced series, which first aired in 2007, "an abomination of modern cinematic technology". The Walt Disney Company condemned the show's contents including its use of Farfour, an unauthorized knockoff of Disney's own Mickey Mouse: "It's not just [about] Mickey, it's [about] indoctrinating children like this, teaching them to be evil. The world loves children, and this is just going against the grain of humanity". Film Threat called the series "a non-stop assault on good taste and intelligence", criticizing the cheap production values and anti-Semitism from the characters. It had also been under fire for its anti-American sentiments.
Uncle Croc's Block
This mid-1970s Saturday morning series purported to be a hosted cartoon series, with Charles Nelson Reilly as the titular host, but was written intentionally as the worst imaginable show of its format, including a purposely unfunny parody of the hit dramedy M*A*S*H called Mangy Unwanted Shabby Heroes (M-U-S-H). Executives at ABC—who ordered the series despite hating its premise—failed to grasp executive producer Lou Scheimer's brand of anti-humor, and as the hourlong series progressed, its time slot was shortened to a half-hour and eventually canceled midseason (a rarity for Saturday morning programs of the era) after ratings plummeted. The cancellation did not bother Scheimer, as it meant that he could pocket the advance ABC paid him to produce a full season without producing the rest of the series. In the longer term, the cancellation "nearly ruined (the) studio" that created it, Scheimer's Filmation, as ABC never ordered another series from the studio again. Reviewers of the series, especially those who had seen the show as children, failed to grasp that the series was supposed to be a parody and took the show's poor quality at face value, particularly in light of Filmation's lack of experience with the format (compared to, for example, Sid and Marty Krofft), resulting in harsh reviews.

== Dramas and soap operas ==
African Queens (Queen Cleopatra)
This 2023 docudrama produced for Netflix is about the lives of historical female monarchs from Africa. While the first season about Nzinga, Queen of Ndongo and Matamba (now present day Angola) was received well by audiences and critics, the second season about Cleopatra, Pharaoh of the Ptolemaic Kingdom of Egypt, was universally panned, particularly by Egyptian audiences. Anita Singh of the British newspaper The Telegraph gave the season 2 out of 5 stars and wrote "It's too soapy for serious history fans, and not enough of a soap for viewers who like juicy historical dramas". The biggest critics of the docudrama came from the Egyptian government, Egyptologists, and historians due to the casting choice of Adele James, an actress of English and Jamaican descent, as Cleopatra. Egypt's Ministry of Antiquities stated that the series represented a "falsification of Egyptian history" and Monica Hanna expressed her discontent with the series stating that "it is pushing an Afrocentric agenda ... imposing the identity politics of the 21st century and appropriating the ancient Egyptian past, just as the Eurocentrists and the far-right in Europe are doing". She further added that ancient Egypt "was more of a culture than it was a race". Egyptian historian Sara Khorsid criticised the season for showing a Western and Orientalist depiction of Egypt.
All's Fair
A 2025 legal drama about an all-female law firm specializing in divorce court, starring socialite Kim Kardashian as the lead, received overwhelmingly negative reviews, including an extremely rare zero-star review from The Guardian, in which Lucy Mangan wrote, "I did not know it was still possible to make television this bad. [...] The new series from Ryan Murphy, All's Fair [...] is terrible. Fascinatingly, incomprehensibly, existentially terrible." Ben Dowell of The Times, who also gave a zero-star rating, said of its message, "It thinks it's a feminist fable about spirited lawyers getting their own back on cruel rich men but is in fact a tacky and revolting monument to the same greed, vanity and avarice it supposedly targets. All scripted, it feels, by a toddler who couldn't write 'bum' on a wall." Critics also pointed to Kardashian's stilted and plodding dialogue and acting.
The Borgias (1981)
Intended to be a gripping historical melodrama in the same vein as the earlier BBC series, I, Claudius, the series was not a critical success. There was criticism of its seeming focus on frequent graphic violence and nudity, and leading actor Adolfo Celi's strong Sicilian accent. Screenonline calls it "one of the most panned series of its day, a fixture of 'all-time worst TV' lists ever since"; the editor of The Penguin TV Companion (2006), nominating it as one of the 20 worst programmes ever made, claimed it had even been condemned by the Vatican.
The Cleopatras
A 1983 BBC Television historical drama serial, set in Ancient Egypt during the latter part of the Ptolemaic Dynasty. Intended to be the I, Claudius of the 1980s, it met with a negative reaction, and was regarded and portrayed as a gaudy farce, and produced a number of complaints due to scenes of nudity. It has never been rebroadcast or released on DVD.
The Colbys
The 1985 premiere episode of the Dynasty spin-off garnered high ratings and won a 1986 People's Choice Award for New Dramatic TV Program, but the first season finished in 35th place while Dynasty finished in seventh the same year. After The Colbys dropped to 76th in its second season, the show was canceled after 49 episodes. The Los Angeles Times called it "a clone" of Dynasty, and television historians Tim Brooks and Earle Marsh believed the series failed because it was "too close a copy" of Dynasty. Barbara Holsopple of Pittsburgh Press likened the scripts to Dick and Jane. Barbara Stanwyck left the series after its first season and told co-creator Esther Shapiro, "This is the biggest pile of garbage I ever did ... It's one thing to know you're making a lot of money off vulgarity, but when you don't know it's vulgar – it's plain stupid".
Cop Rock
This musical police procedural, which aired on ABC in 1990 and ended with just 11 episodes, has been cited as one of the worst television series ever as it ranked No. 8 on TV Guide's 50 Worst TV Shows of All Time list in 2002. The show was a critical and commercial failure from the beginning and was canceled by the network after 11 episodes. Owing to the combination of its bizarre nature and its high-powered production talent (including an Emmy win for composer Randy Newman), it became infamous as one of the biggest television failures of the 1990s.
Eldorado
This BBC soap opera from 1992 was, despite heavy advertising, a notorious flop. Many of the cast were inexperienced actors whose limitations were clearly exposed on such a new and ambitious project; the acting was derided as amateurish, while the attempt to appear more 'European' by having people speaking other languages without subtitles or bizarre/unconvincing accents was met by viewers with incomprehension and ridicule. Eldorado is remembered as an embarrassing failure for the BBC, and is sometimes used as a byword for any unsuccessful, poorly received or overhyped television programme.
The Idol
The 2023 HBO series starring Lily-Rose Depp and Abel Tesfaye (The Weeknd) received widespread negative critical reviews, making it HBO's worst-reviewed program. It was deemed "2023's biggest TV disaster" by the BBC, the worst of the year by The Telegraph, and "one of the worst programmes ever made" by The Guardian. Yahoo! included The Idol among "HBO's worst shows ever" while noting Tesfaye's "hopelessly flat" acting. The Hollywood Reporter commented on the "thin plot and an incoherent narrative", and Laura Martin of the BBC expressed her "confusion" over the show's storyline. "It seemed to be many shows masquerading as one: was it an erotic drama, exploring power dynamics in an S&M relationship? Was it a satire on the absurd nature of the music industry?" The Idol was also noted by critics for its exploitative and misogynistic nature, and Rolling Stone reported that the show — called a "dark satire of fame" by director Sam Levinson — was described as a "rape fantasy" and contained a toxic work environment, including Tesfaye's "egomaniacal" behavior and Levinson's script changes "making [the show] less about a troubled starlet falling victim to a predatory industry figure and fighting to reclaim her own agency, and more of a degrading love story with a hollow message". Despite a Cannes Film Festival premiere (being only the fifth TV series ever to premiere at the festival), The Idol suffered from poor ratings and was canceled after only one season of five episodes. Nardos Haile of Salon wrote, "R.I.P. to The Idol — finally. I feel a beautiful sort of vindication that the utterly despised short-lived, controversy-laden HBO drama will never reign as the prestigious television it strived and failed to masquerade as".
Ironside (2013)
NBC's remake of Raymond Burr's 1967 crime drama was canceled after only four episodes due to poor ratings, and drew protest beforehand from disabled actors for casting Blair Underwood as the wheelchair-using title character. NBC responded that an able-bodied actor was needed to perform flashback scenes, but actor Kurt Yaeger likened it to "having a white guy do blackface". Neil Genzlinger of The New York Times wrote that the show's "plodding writing" and Underwood's performance "makes the title character an unpleasant combination of macho and brusque", and Slant noted Underwood's "oppressive, angry" portrayal as "a protagonist who believes his impairment gives him the authority to act like a total ass". The show was described by Complex as "an eye-rolling, monotonous, procedural mess", and by the St. Louis Post-Dispatch as an "unnecessary remake" that was "too grim and unengaging". Tim Goodman of The Hollywood Reporter commented, "It's just another detective show. And it's not even a very good one". The A.V. Club, Rolling Stone, New York Post, and USA Today named Ironside among their worst shows of 2013.
Killer Instinct
A 2005 American crime drama television series that was filmed in Vancouver and originally aired on the Fox Network. The series is set in San Francisco and forces of a group of detectives handling the city's most bizarre crimes. The series received poor reviews from critics. The series has an approval rating of 0% on Rotten Tomatoes based on eight reviews. On Metacritic, the series has a weighted average score of 25 out of 100 based on 13 critics, indicating "generally unfavorable" reviews. Brian Lowry of Variety wrote: "Fox leads better than it follows, which is perhaps why this drama about San Francisco's Deviant Crimes Unit seems so lifeless and uninspired. The producers jettison the pilot's leading lady five minutes into the second hour, though her replacement doesn't really improve things. The evidence points to another Friday-night casualty".
Skins (U.S. remake)
MTV's 2011 remake of the 2007 British series generated controversy over its sexual content and raised accusations of child pornography, since many of the actors were under the age of 18. Outcry from the Parents Television Council, along with numerous companies pulling their advertising from the program, led to the series being canceled after one season of ten episodes. Foster Kramer of Esquire had called it "a horrifically bad show" while Caitlin Dickson of The Atlantic criticized its acting and shock value.
Supertrain
Supertrain was the most expensive series ever aired in the United States at the time. The production was beset by problems including a model train that crashed. While the series was heavily advertised during the 1978–79 season, it suffered from poor reviews and low ratings. Despite attempts to salvage the show by reworking the cast, it never took off and left the air after only three months. NBC, which had produced the show itself, with help from Dark Shadows producer Dan Curtis, was unable to recoup its losses. Combined with the U.S. boycott of the 1980 Summer Olympics the following season, which cost NBC millions in ad revenue, the series nearly bankrupted the network. For these reasons, Supertrain has been called one of the greatest television flops. It would also come to define Fred Silverman’s tumultuous tenure as president of NBC after success at CBS and ABC. The A.V. Club noted that Supertrain has a reputation as "one of the worst television series ever made...it was hugely expensive, little watched, and critically derided".
Triangle
A soap opera about a British ferry that starred Kate O'Mara, Triangle is remembered as "some of the most mockable British television ever produced". The series is even humorously mentioned in passing in the BBC comedy series The Young Ones - "Even Triangle has better furniture than this!"
Viva Laughlin
CBS's 2007 American adaptation of the British series Blackpool lasted only two episodes, one in Australia. Like the aforementioned Cop Rock, the series was an attempt to create a musical TV drama; in this case, the series had a fatal flaw in that the lead actors sang over hit records with the original vocal tracks intact. The opening line of The New York Times review said, "Viva Laughlin on CBS may well be the worst new show of the season, but is it the worst show in the history of television?" Newsday's review started with, "The stud is a dud. And that's only the first of a dozen problems with CBS' admirably ambitious but jaw-droppingly wrongheaded new musical/murder mystery/family drama Viva Laughlin. Let us count the ways it bombs..."

== Fantasy and science fiction shows ==
Galactica 1980
The 1979 cancellation of Battlestar Galactica prompted a letter-writing campaign by fans that convinced ABC to revive the show as Galactica 1980, but with a significantly reduced budget that resulted in the setting being changed to Earth three decades after the events of the original program, while the cast was overhauled save for Lorne Greene and Herbert Jefferson Jr. Galactica 1980 was negatively received as a result and canceled after ten episodes. GamesRadar+ named the show among its "Top 25 Worst Sci-Fi and Fantasy TV Shows Ever" in 2012, lambasting its "cardboard cut-out heroes" and having "more loathsome kids than any other SF show ever". Gordon Jackson of io9 criticized it as "ill-advised" and "lack[ing] any of the zest of the original series". Carol Pinchefsky of Syfy wrote in 2017, "[P]lease, oh please, let’s not think about Galactica 1980", and The Guardian called the show "woeful". Luke Y. Thompson of Nerdist deemed it "extremely difficult to defend", and considered the absence of original series star Richard Hatch a factor in its demise. Hatch had rejected reprising his role as Captain Apollo, as he felt the changes "ruined the story. I just wasn't interested". In 2020, 40 years after the show's broadcast, Medium described Galactica 1980 as "having earned its dubious place in the history of televised science fiction".
Inhumans
The 2017 eight-episode series—based on the Marvel Comics race of the same name—was canceled by ABC after one season due to low ratings, and is regarded by critics as one of the worst works in the Marvel Cinematic Universe. The IMAX premiere of the first two episodes was poorly received and grossed only $2.6 million in its opening weekend, with Comic Book Resources commenting that "Inhumans is already a disaster" that "sounded a sour note with fans". The Hollywood Reporter criticized the "poorly developed characters [and] confusing superpowers", and Entertainment Weekly noted the "terrible acting". The series was described as "look[ing] like the worst Marvel show out there" by The New York Times, "a disappointment on every level" by IGN, "a messy, miserable show" by io9, and by Vox as "jaw-droppingly awful television. Even worse, it's boring". Uproxx opined that Inhumans "has no reason to exist except that Marvel wanted it to, by any means necessary". IndieWire declared that the series was "the worst thing Marvel has done in decades".
Manimal
Manimal was scheduled by NBC opposite CBS's Dallas, and was canceled after eight episodes due to low ratings. It was a part of NBC's 1983 fall line-up, which featured eight other series that were canceled before their first seasons ended (including Jennifer Slept Here and Bay City Blues). John Javna's book The Best of Science Fiction TV rated Manimal among its "Worst Science Fiction Shows of All Time". TV Guide ranked Manimal number 15 on their list of the 50 Worst TV Shows of All Time in 2002. In 2004, readers of the British trade magazine Broadcast voted Manimal as one of the worst television shows ever exported by the US to the UK.

== Game shows ==
Beast Games
The 2024 reality competition television series created by and starring Jimmy "MrBeast" Donaldson. On Rotten Tomatoes it has an approval rating of 13% based on 8 critic reviews with an average rating of 3.8/10, and a Metacritic score of 38 out of 100 based on five critical reviews. Donaldson was criticized for his loud and shallow performance, and the show for its lack of focus on the contestants. Naomi Fry of The New Yorker wrote that the use of contestants' numbers instead of their names made it difficult to empathize with them, unlike other reality shows. IGN, The Guardian, Vox, and PC Gamer criticized the show for closely following the premise of Squid Game while stripping away its dystopian tone. Contestants complained that they were denied food, water, medication, and beds during the production of the show. Additionally, dozens reported that various injuries took place during the first filming sessions, as well as mistreatment, sexual harassment, and not being paid for overtime. On September 16, 2024, a class action lawsuit was filed in the Los Angeles Superior Court. According to a December 2024 Rolling Stone report on the working conditions for Beast Games published earlier that month, a portion of a tower exterior fell on a crew member on September 11, 2024. Later that month, the Ontario Ministry of Labour confirmed that it had opened an investigation into an on-set industrial incident on September 11, 2024. It stated that two of the employers, Blink 49 Studios and Manhattan Beach Studios, were each issued a "requirement." The Toronto Police Service also released a statement saying that they had been called to set for the incident but were not investigating as there was not a criminal element.
Don't Scare the Hare
The premiere of the 2011 British game show hosted by Jason Bradbury drew 1.93 million viewers for a 15% audience share, but was canceled after only three of nine planned episodes due to poor ratings. Jim Shelley of the Daily Mirror wrote: "The idiots playing might have enjoyed themselves but even toddlers would have found the games dull and Jason creepy". The Stage observed: "The actual games are pretty feeble and uninspired, leaving the poor hare and his robotic novelty value to carry the show". John Anson of the Lancashire Evening Post opined: "If you're going to have a gimmick in your game show at least make it entertaining. ... Make the questions simple, involve bunches of kids and hey, presto it works... But primetime Saturday night viewing it ain't". Alex May of Now Then magazine called the show "without question, the worst game show in the world, ever". Complex said in 2011, "Don't Scare The Hare was canceled after only three episodes aired for a reason—the show was absolutely terrible". Caroline Westbrook of Metro listed the "frankly bizarre" show among her 2013 selection of "so bad they're brilliant" game shows. Digital Spy rated Don't Scare the Hare sixth among the "10 of the worst TV shows of all time" in 2016, and Scott Harris-King of Grunge included it in his 2017 list of "dumb game shows someone should've been fired for".
The Million Second Quiz
Marred by a confusing and boring format that jeopardized the health of its contestants, excessive and unwarranted hype, banal questions, and a random decision to inflate the grand prize after it was won solely to set the record for most money won on a single game show, The Million Second Quiz was lambasted by critics and suffered from collapsing ratings throughout its short run in 2013. A review for The A.V. Club was indicative of the reception: "so deeply flawed and so universally unpopular that it is not going to remain in anyone's memory for long".
Naked Jungle
A UK game show on Channel 5 that revolved around naturists performing an assault course, based on Jungle Run. Naked Jungle was savaged by critics, denounced by nudists for being exploitative and even condemned in the House of Commons of the United Kingdom. A group of TV historians later voted it the worst British TV show ever. Host Keith Chegwin later called presenting the show "the worst career move I made in my entire life".
Shafted
A UK game show aired on ITV presented by Robert Kilroy-Silk. It is most notorious for Kilroy-Silk's laughable actions on the show, which have since been frequently mocked on popular satirical show Have I Got News for You since late 2004. Particularly notable is his delivery of the show's tagline, "Their fate will be in each other's hands as they decide whether to share or to shaft", and the associated hand actions. The show was dropped just four episodes after it started in 2001, and was listed as the worst British television show of the 2000s in the Penguin TV Companion (2006). A 2012 postmortem of the show read: "Nothing seemed to work for Shafted from the start. It looked derivative, it sounded derivative, the format was pretty unfair, the host was bad, and it just wasn't that interesting. So basically nothing worked out". In an article on ITV programmes, Stuart Heritage described Shafted as "Hamfisted" and stated it was "deservedly remembered as one of the worst television programmes ever made".
Three's a Crowd
Created and produced by Chuck Barris, and hosted by Jim Peck, this game show aired in syndication from 1979 to 1980. A male contestant was asked pointed personal questions, which were then asked of both his wife and secretary, to find out which of the two knew him better. David Hofstede, author of What Were They Thinking?: The 100 Dumbest Events in Television History wrote that it "offered the chance to watch a marriage dissolve on camera years before Jerry Springer", and noted that it received backlash from the United Auto Workers and the National Organization for Women. By the time the controversy settled in 1980, Three's a Crowd and all three of Barris's other shows (The Dating Game, The Newlywed Game, and The Gong Show) had been canceled. His next two projects, revivals of Treasure Hunt and Camouflage, were also failures; neither lasted beyond one season. Barris, his reputation effectively ruined, would never again create a new game show. He stuck to revivals of his previous shows for the rest of his career.
Who's Whose
The 1951 panel game show was described at the time as "one of the most poorly produced TV shows yet to hit our living room screen", and "a miserable flop". while columnist Rex Lardner wrote that the show was "the worst ever to hit television". Who's Whose, rushed into production to fill a hole caused when The Goldbergs refused to comply with the Hollywood blacklist, was the first television series to be canceled after one episode, and its host, radio personality Phil Baker, had his contract bought out; it would be Baker's only television hosting role.
You're in the Picture
The premiere of this 1961 CBS game show hosted by Jackie Gleason received extremely hostile reviews that the following Friday, Gleason appeared in the same time slot inside a stripped-down studio to give what Time magazine called an "inspiring post-mortem", asking rhetorically "how it was possible for a group of trained people to put on so big a flop". Time later cited You're in the Picture as one piece of evidence that the 1960–61 TV season was the "worst in the [then] 13-year history of U.S. network television".

== News and political commentaries ==
The Morning Program
On January 12, 1987, The Morning Program made its debut on CBS hosted by actress Mariette Hartley and Rolland Smith, former longtime anchor at WCBS-TV in New York City. Radio personality Mark McEwen handled the weather, while Bob Saget did comedy bits. Produced by the network's entertainment division, the show ran for 90 minutes (7:30–9 am local time) behind a briefly expanded 90-minute CBS Early Morning News (6–7:30 am local; although most larger affiliates pre-empted all or part of the 6–7 am hour to produce a local morning newscast), which had dropped "Early" from its title. However, The Morning Program, with its awkward mix of news, entertainment, and comedy, became the joke of the industry, receiving scathing reviews. At one point, it generated the lowest ratings CBS had seen in the morning slot in five years. The format was aborted and the time slot returned to the news division after a ten-and-a-half-month run. Hartley and Smith were dumped, while Saget left to star on the ABC sitcom Full House, which premiered later that same year. A longtime producer summed up this version of the program upon its demise by saying, "...everyone thought we had the lowest ratings you could have in the morning. The Morning Program proved us wrong".
Der schwarze Kanal
Aired weekly from 1960 to October of 1989 on DFF/DDR-FS, Der schwarze Kanal consisted of selected recorded excerpts of West German television followed by a communist commentary usually from chief commentator Karl-Eduard von Schnitzler. Although it initially enjoyed sizeable ratings of around 20% in the 1960s, it rapidly declined with the opening of alternative channels and had to rely on being abruptly aired after popular Monday night films to draw in passive viewers; by 1989, the show had a dismal primetime viewership rate of 5% on one of two official television channels. The show was broadcast due to the availability of West German television signals over much of East Germany, which von Schnitzler sought to "clean" (the title, which means 'the black channel', is a pun on a euphemism for sewers as well as the CDU's usage of black as a political symbol). The intellectually heavy-handed, caustic, and blatant nature of the propaganda in addition to scandals over von Schnitzler and his wife's opulent shopping trips to West Berlin made the show and von Schnitzler a laughing stock among the public with a common GDR joke referencing his name as "von Schni–" as the television would be rapidly turned off upon his name being mentioned. Von Schnitzler's rhetoric in itself was unpopular and controversial: he described Peter Fechter, an 18-year-old killed by border guards while trying to cross the Berlin Wall as "both a victim and a perpetrator" and provided justification and applause to political repression. The show ZDF-Magazin on West German channel ZDF hosted by Gerhard Löwenthal, airing from 1969 to 1988, was seen as the western and anti-communist counter aimed towards East Germans and shared similar rhetoric, although Löwenthal publicised and condemned human rights abuses rather than denying or justifying them, and attracted more viewers. Von Schnitzler and Löwenthal provided templates for each other. With the collapse of East German communism in the autumn of 1989, Der schwarze Kanal was axed as von Schnitzler refused to moderate or reform his rhetoric, airing its last episode on 30 October 1989, less than two weeks before the fall of the Berlin Wall.

== Reality television series ==
Being Bobby Brown
An American reality television series that debuted on Bravo on June 30, 2005. The series depicts the life of R&B singer Bobby Brown, his then-wife, pop/R&B superstar Whitney Houston, and their family and provided a view of the domestic goings-on in the Brown household. The series aired in 2005 and featured Houston and Brown in unflattering moments and received mostly negative reviews. Rolling Stone called it "The Cruel Reality-TV Exploitation of Whitney Houston", Variety referred to the show as a "vanity project [that] almost makes Britney and Kevin's show look deep and revealing -- OK, almost" and Today called the show "disgusting" with reviewer Barry Garron writing that "'Being Bobby Brown', the reality show spotlighting the R&B singer whose rap sheet might be longer than his catalog, is undoubtedly the most disgusting and execrable series ever to ooze its way onto television". Garron also noted that the show contained remarks regarding sexual and excretory functions. Years later, The Guardian opined that through her participation in the show, Houston had lost "the last remnants of her dignity". Despite the so-called train-wreck nature of the show, the series was extremely popular, winning its time slot, and gave Bravo its highest ratings ever.
The Briefcase
An American reality TV series created by Dave Broome that premiered on CBS on May 27, 2015. In each episode, two American families undergoing financial hardship are each given a briefcase containing $101,000, and must decide whether to keep all the money for themselves or give some or all of it to the other family. Over the course of 72 hours, each family learns about the other and makes a decision without knowing that the other family has also been given a briefcase with the same instructions. The Briefcase was met with largely negative reception from critics. Ken Tucker, critic-at-large of Yahoo! TV, described it as "cynical and repulsive" for "passing off its exploitation...as uplifting, inspirational TV". Jason Miller of Time.com called it "the worst reality TV show ever". Others compared the show to fictional films and television that pitted the needy against each other, such as the Twilight Zone episode "Button, Button", or The Hunger Games.
Here Comes Honey Boo Boo
An American reality television series on TLC, featuring the family of child beauty pageant contestant Alana "Honey Boo Boo" Thompson. The show premiered on August 8, 2012. Thompson and her family originally rose to fame on TLC's reality series Toddlers & Tiaras. The show mainly revolves around Alana "Honey Boo Boo" Thompson and "Mama" June Shannon and their family's adventures in the Southern town of McIntyre, Georgia. Critical reaction to the series was largely negative, with some characterizing the show as "offensive", "outrageous", and "exploitative", while others called it "must-see TV". The A.V. Club called the first episode a "horror story posing as a reality television program", with others worrying about potential child exploitation.
Jersey Shore
A string of controversies over the U.S. MTV series documenting members of the Guido subculture made this series one of the most controversial in television history.
Kid Nation
Airing on CBS during the 2007–08 season, Kid Nation focused on children trying to create their own society with little supervision from adults. The show proved controversial, with CBS and the show’s producers facing complaints of child exploitation that would result in investigations by authorities in New Mexico, where production took place. Though no criminal charges were ultimately filed, the show’s ratings never took off and the series was canceled after one season.
The One: Making a Music Star
At the time of its premiere, according to overnight ratings from Nielsen Media Research, the first episode of The One was the lowest-rated series premiere in ABC history, and the second-worst such episode in the history of American broadcast television, scoring only 3.2 million total viewers (1.1 rating in the 18–49 demographic), and fifth place in its timeslot. In Canada, the premiere of The One on CBC had 236,000 viewers, which trailed far behind Canadian Idol on CTV and Rock Star: Supernova on Global, each scoring around one million viewers. The next night's results episode fared even worse in the United States ratings, sinking to a 1.0 rating in the 18–49 demographic. The re-run of night 1's episode (which preceded the results show) plunged to an embarrassingly low 0.6 average in the vital demo ratings. The poor performance of the show helped ABC measure its lowest-rated night in the network's history (among 18–49s), finishing tied for sixth place. The series was ultimately canceled after a second week of poor results. According to CBC executive Kirstine Layfield, in terms of resources and money, The One "had the most backing from ABC than any summer show has ever had (sic)". The One was touted as a show that would dethrone American Idol, then the most-watched show in the United States; such high expectations for the series made the resounding public rejection of it all the more spectacular. Canadian ratings have dipped as low as 150,000 – not necessarily out of step with the CBC's usual summer ratings, although much lower than the broadcaster's stated expectations for primetime audiences, in the one-million range. The CBC initially insisted that despite the cancellation, a planned Canadian version may still go ahead, citing the success of the format in Quebec (Star Académie) and Britain (the BBC's Fame Academy). The network confirmed that the show will not air in fall 2006 – in fact, the show had never been given a fall timeslot – but the show was "still under development". Critical response was limited but generally negative. A 2018 article on TV By the Numbers identified the show as "the nadir of ABC's forays into music competitions", among a list of seven major flops in the format ABC had attempted in the 21st century (the article noted in its headline "ABC is terrible at music shows"). John de Mol Jr. (the creator of The One) would later find much greater success with his next music-based reality contest, The Voice.
The Swan
The 2004 plastic surgery reality series has been panned by multiple critics. Robert Bianco of USA Today called The Swan "hurtful and repellent even by reality's constantly plummeting standards". Journalist Jennifer Pozner, in her book Reality Bites Back, calls The Swan "the most sadistic reality series of the decade". Journalist Chris Hedges also criticized the show in his 2009 book Empire of Illusion, writing "The Swan's transparent message is that once these women have been surgically 'corrected' to resemble mainstream celebrity beauty as closely as possible, their problems will be solved". Feminist scholar Susan J. Douglas criticized the show in her book The Rise of Enlightened Sexism for its continuation of a negative female body image, claiming that "it made all too explicit the narrow physical standards to which women are expected to conform, the sad degree to which women internalize these standards, the lengths needed to get there, and the impossibility for most of us to meet the bar without, well, taking a box cutter to our faces and bodies". Author Alice Marwick believes that this program is an example of "body culture media", which she describes as "a genre of popular culture which positions work on the body as a morally correct solution to personal problems". Marwick also suggests that cosmetic reality television encourages viewers to frame their family, financial, or social problems in bodily terms, and portrays surgical procedures as an everyday and normal solution. The Swan attracted further criticism internationally as British comedian and writer Charlie Brooker launched attacks on it during his Channel 4 show You Have Been Watching, where guest Josie Long suggested the show be renamed "The bullies were right". The show was ranked at No. 1 in Entertainment Weekly's 10 Worst Reality-TV Shows Ever. It was also the subject of the first episode of the 2024 VICE docuseries Dark Side of Reality TV.

== Sitcoms ==
The Fairly OddParents: Fairly Odder
A sequel and spin-off of Nickelodeon's original animated series The Fairly OddParents developed by Christopher J. Nowak. The series aired on Paramount+ on March 31, 2022, for only one season of 13 episodes. It was near-universally panned by critics, viewers, and fans of the original series. It was unfavorably compared to Saturday Night Live sketches and was hailed as a "fucking zombie" before airing. Criticism focused on the show being live-action that "took away the kookiness" the original show had and its weak writing and lack of humor. In January 2023, the show was quietly delisted from Paramount+.

== Specials and television films ==
The Decision
On July 8, 2010, LeBron James announced on a live ESPN special that he would be playing for the Miami Heat for the 2010–11 season. In exchange for the rights to air the special, ESPN agreed to hand over its advertising and airtime to James. James arranged for the special to include an interview by Jim Gray, who had no affiliation with the network and was paid by James's marketing company. The show drew criticism for making viewers wait 28 minutes before James revealed his decision, and for the spectacle involved. The phrase "taking my talents to South Beach", which James said when he revealed his choice, became a punchline for critics. The special drew 13 million viewers, but ESPN's reporting leading up to the program, its decision to air it, and the network relinquishing its editorial independence were called gross violations of journalistic ethics. In 2012, Forbes listed James as one of the world's most disliked athletes on the basis of his move to Miami.
Eaten Alive
This 2014 Discovery Channel special purported to have host Paul Rosolie swallowed whole by an 18-foot (5.5-meter) anaconda. It drew criticism from those who felt Discovery was aiming for sensationalism and shock value. Rosolie was never actually consumed before the stunt was prematurely called off due to safety concerns, which resulted in heavy viewer complaints. PETA criticized the special as an example of "entertainment features ... that show humans interfering with and handling wild animals [that] are detrimental to species conservation". In January 2015, Discovery president Rich Ross admitted the special's promotion was "misleading".
Elvis in Concert
This TV special was a recorded Elvis Presley concert held on June 19, 1977. Presley's deteriorating health was evident in his weight gain and his inability to remember several song lyrics. The network's plans to record another concert and get better footage fell through when Presley died on August 16, 1977. The special, which aired in October 1977 and May 1978, has been called "terrible and embarrassing" and a "travesty". The Presley estate refuses to release the special on VHS or DVD to this day.
First Night 2013 with Jamie Kennedy
On December 31, 2012, KDOC-TV aired a live New Year's Eve special hosted by comedian and actor Jamie Kennedy. It was riddled with mishaps and technical issues, including periods of dead air, unedited explicit language, and Kennedy randomly speaking into his microphone, unaware he was live. A fistfight erupted onstage during the end credits. The special was deemed "the world's worst New Year's broadcast" by The A.V. Club, "the worst New Year's Eve show of all time" by Uproxx, and "the worst in television history" by Gawker. Kotaku called it a "class-five flaming disaster", and Huffington Post noted the special's "astounding level of technical incompetence". In 2018, Good Housekeeping included the show among its selection of the "most dramatic TV catastrophes ever". Comedian Jensen Karp described Brett Kavanaugh's Supreme Court confirmation hearing as "running as smooth as a Jamie Kennedy New Years Eve special". Kennedy claimed the show's miscues were intentional, and defended his work in an interview with The New York Times: "I didn't stab nobody, I didn't shoot nobody. I just made a New Year's Eve special. Is that so bad?"
If I Did It
In November 2006, O. J. Simpson, who had been acquitted of the murder of his ex-wife Nicole Brown Simpson and her friend Ronald Goldman in a trial in 1995, wrote a book describing how he would have committed the murders, if he had done so. He arranged for publisher Judith Regan to interview him about the book in a promotional television special. NBC refused to air it; Fox almost did before backing out at the insistence of its affiliates. The Goldman family, who won a $33,500,000 wrongful death settlement in 1997 against Simpson and insist he is guilty of the murders despite his acquittal, declared the special "an all-time low for television", and arranged for HarperCollins to fire Regan for alleged "anti-Semitic remarks". Regan sued HarperCollins for wrongful termination and won, but Fox CEO Rupert Murdoch admitted the special was an "ill-considered project". The special never aired in its original form, and the book's rights were turned over to the Goldmans, who retitled the book If I Did It: Confessions of the Killer, with the If in much smaller type. In 2018, the special was re-edited, with new bridging segments hosted by Soledad O'Brien, and titled O.J. Simpson: The Lost Confession. The Goldman family approved of the re-edited special, which aired in March 2018.
James Paul McCartney
This 1973 special produced by ATV showcasing Paul McCartney and his band Wings received a highly unfavourable critical reception. The authors Chip Madinger and Mark Easter later remarked that the show "was roundly panned by every critic with a pulse, and was not a stunning success in the ratings either".
Live into 85
The BBC's 1984 New Year's Eve special, broadcast live from the Gleneagles Hotel, was beset by problems, featuring visible and audible interference from intoxicated paying guests after the venue was not booked exclusively for the TV production - including attempts to grope and look up singer Maggie Moone's dress - actor John Grieve forgetting all but the first two lines of a poem he had performed multiple times previously and corpsing under the influence of alcohol, and comedian Chic Murray displaying confusion and inawareness of where the TV cameras were whilst acting as first-footer. The show was pulled from broadcast when host Tom O'Connor was speaking mid-sentence: he later described it as "the show that died of shame". The broadcast was panned by critics, with Norman Harper describing it as "televised tripe". The special marked an end to a tradition of tartanry-heavy, Scottish-based BBC Hogmanay broadcasts being trasmitted across the UK since 1953, with the corporation pledging that viewers would "not hear a bagpipe, an accordion or the swirl of a kilt" during the next New Year's Eve broadcast.
Liz & Dick
This 2012 Lifetime original movie starred Lindsay Lohan in the title role of Elizabeth Taylor. Matt Roush of TV Guide called it an "epic of pathetic miscasting" and "laughably inept". According to David Wiegand of the San Francisco Chronicle, the film is "so terrible, you'll need to ice your face when it's over to ease the pain of wincing for two hours" and "the performances range from barely adequate to terrible. That would be [Grant] Bowler [as Richard Burton] in the "barely adequate" slot and Lohan, well, in the other one". Jeff Simon of The Buffalo News noted, based on a consensus of other reviews, that "it's the howler everyone expected" and openly mused that the film could end Lohan's acting career. At Metacritic, which assigns a normalized rating out of 100 to reviews from mainstream critics, the film received an average score of 26, which indicates "generally unfavorable reviews", based on 27 reviews.
Magical Mystery Tour
A television film starring the Beatles, Magical Mystery Tour was harshly received by both critics and fans of the band, becoming the group's first critical failure. Although shot in colour, its original transmission was on BBC1 on Boxing Day 1967, which only broadcast on black-and-white at that point. The Beatles' producer, George Martin, said that the film "looked awful" in black-and-white and was "a disaster". As one of the main creative forces behind the film, Paul McCartney appeared on ITV's The David Frost Programme several days later to defend the work; according to the band's then-official biographer Hunter Davis, this marked "the first time in memory that any artist felt obliged to make a public apology for his work."
Megalodon: The Monster Shark Lives
As part of their annual Shark Week programming, Discovery Channel aired a special on August 4, 2013, that alleged the continued existence of the megalodon, a long-extinct giant shark species. While the show attracted a record 4.8 million viewers, it was later criticized for fabricating events that were passed off as fact. Huffington Post called Shark Week "a disgrace" in response to the special. The Atlantic wrote, "[T]he last bastion of science-related television was Discovery Channel. But no more". Christie Wilcox of Discover accused the network of "peddling lies and faking stories for ratings". Wired deemed the show "the absolute worst of Shark Week" in that it "mockumentary-ized [reality] using fake experts and videos". John Oliver of The Daily Show called it "a faked two hour shark-gasm", and actor Wil Wheaton wrote that Discovery owed its viewers an apology for airing "a cynical ploy for ratings [that] deliberately lied to its audience and presented fiction as fact". The special was highlighted in a 2014 article by The Verge titled "How Shark Week Screws Scientists". Discovery responded that Megalodon had contained multiple disclaimers that some events were dramatized and that the "institutions or agencies" who appeared therein had no affiliation with the special, nor approved its contents.
The Mystery of Al Capone's Vaults
This 1986 live television special involved opening a newly discovered vault previously owned by mafia boss Al Capone. Promotions heavily implied that the vault was likely to contain artifacts from Capone's life, or even dead bodies. When the vault was opened, it contained a handful of empty moonshine bottles and nothing else. Host Geraldo Rivera had been fired from his job as a reporter for ABC, and this special marked a turning point, pivoting his career from journalism to tabloid entertainment, including his eponymous talk show. The special's anti-climatic nature was received poorly, with the New York Daily News accusing it of failing to take Capone's crimes seriously. A 2023 article by Rolling Stone placed it at number 41 of the 50 worst events in television history.
Poochinski
This unsold pilot aired as a one-off special on NBC in 1990. The show, which featured Peter Boyle as the voice of a detective who is killed and reincarnated as a bulldog, has been mocked for its bizarre premise and copious amounts of toilet humor.
Rapsittie Street Kids: Believe in Santa
Rapsittie Street Kids: Believe in Santa premiered on Kids' WB during the 2002 holiday season, with a voice cast including Mark Hamill, Walter Emanuel Jones, Jodi Benson and Paige O'Hara. It was intended to be the first of a series of films, but its negative reception, particularly for its computer animation, led to those plans being canceled and the special never being broadcast again with no home video release. Dan Neilan of The A.V. Club called it "horrific" and "far beyond terrible", citing the "nightmarish characters that rarely blink and never properly interact with their environment". In 2022, Troy Brownfield of The Saturday Evening Post called it the worst Christmas special due to its "ugly" animation. Polygon and Engadget deemed it the worst holiday film ever made. Writing for Rotten Tomatoes, Alonso Duralde remarked that Hamill "can now claim that he was in a holiday special even worse than the Star Wars one".
Star Wars Holiday Special
This 1978 TV special has been heavily criticized by Star Wars fans and the general public. David Hofstede, author of What Were They Thinking?: The 100 Dumbest Events in Television History, ranked the holiday special at number one, calling it "the worst two hours of television ever". Shepard Smith, a former news anchor for the Fox News Channel, referred to it as a "'70s train wreck, combining the worst of Star Wars with the utter worst of variety television". Actor Phillip Bloch explained on a TV Land special entitled The 100 Most Unexpected TV Moments, that the special, "...just wasn't working. It was just so surreal". On the same program, Ralph Garman, a voice actor for the show Family Guy, explained that "Star Wars Holiday Special is one of the most infamous television programs in history. And it's so bad that it actually comes around to good again, but passes it right up". George Lucas, who had little involvement with the special's production, is quoted as saying, "If I had the time and a sledgehammer, I would track down every copy of that program and smash it". The only aspect of the special that has been generally well-received is the animated segment by Canadian animation studio Nelvana, which introduces Boba Fett, who became a popular character when he appeared in the Star Wars theatrical films.
Who Wants to Marry a Multi-Millionaire?
In this January 2000 special, 50 female contestants competed to immediately marry an unseen multimillionaire. Unbeknownst to the contestants and viewers, Rick Rockwell barely qualified for the title (owning $2,000,000 in assets, including non-liquid ones) and had a record of domestic violence. Rockwell and winner Darva Conger never consummated their relationship, and the marriage was annulled on April 5, 2000. In a 2010 issue of TV Guide, the show was ranked No. 9 on a list of TV's ten biggest "blunders".

== Sports ==
The Baseball Network (Baseball Night in America) (1994–1995)
This short-lived joint venture between ABC, NBC, and Major League Baseball (MLB) premiered immediately after CBS's four-year run as Major League Baseball's over-the-air broadcaster (which was itself a disaster, compared at least once to the Exxon Valdez oil spill). It was a pioneer in that the league produced and owned the rights to the telecasts, including half of the regular season and the postseason, but it was mostly a flop.

The Baseball Network had exclusivity in every market, so in markets with two teams, a Baseball Network game featuring one team prevented all viewers in the market from seeing the other team's game that night. Fans of East Coast teams couldn't see games played on the West Coast (or vice versa) in the team's home market because they started too early or too late. Regionalized coverage lasted well into the postseason. Finally, a players' strike ended the 1994 season in mid-August, cancelling the entire postseason, including the World Series.

Sports Illustrated's Tom Verducci dubbed The Baseball Network "America's regional pastime" and an "abomination". Bob Costas wrote that it was an unprecedented surrender of prestige and a slap to all serious fans. When public address announcer Tom Hutyler mentioned The Baseball Network during the Mariners-Yankees ALDS at Seattle's Kingdome, the crowd erupted in boos.

The Baseball Network shut down at the end of the 1995 season. When ABC Sports president Dennis Swanson announced the dissolution, he said "The fact of the matter is, Major League Baseball seems incapable at this point in time, of living with any long term relationships, whether it's with fans, with players, with the political community in Washington, with the advertising community here in Manhattan, or with its TV partners".
Celebrity Boxing (2002)
This two-episode icon of Fox's "lowbrow" era ranked number 6 on TV Guide's "50 Worst TV Shows of All Time" list. The boxers were mostly "D-list" celebrities and people involved in notorious criminal cases. One match pitted Joey Buttafuoco (taking the place of "Weird Al" Yankovic, who refused to fight a woman) against pro wrestler Chyna; Buttafuoco won in a decision.
Jake Paul vs. Mike Tyson (2024)
This professional boxing match featuring YouTuber and former Disney Channel star-turned-boxer Jake Paul and former undisputed heavyweight champion Mike Tyson was widely criticised for a variety of factors prior to and after the event.

Many viewers and other boxers criticised the event due to the 31-year age difference between the combatants, the largest recorded in the history of professional boxing. Former UFC Middleweight Champion, Sean Strickland stated that the fight should be illegal, and fellow YouTuber-turned-boxer KSI described the bout as "elderly abuse".

At the weigh-in the day prior to the fight, Paul performed a racist gesture towards Tyson by imitating the knuckle-walking done by non-human primates and then proceeding to step on Tyson's toes. In retaliation, Tyson slapped Paul across the face. On the day of the event, many viewers expressed outrage towards Netflix due to the widespread technical difficulties that prevented them from watching the highly anticipated fight.

Paul won the fight by unanimous decision, largely after Tyson shifted his strategy to surviving the bout by avoiding taking punches and making very few shots of his own.
NBA on ABC (2002–present)
Viewer complaints about ABC's telecasts of NBA games since the 2002 season include strange camera angles (including the Floorcam and Skycam angles), shots from too far away, colors that seem faded and dull, and quieting the crowd noise so that announcers can be heard clearly; NBC had allowed crowd noise to occasionally drown out their announcers. The 2003 NBA Finals received very little fanfare on ABC or corporate partner ESPN. Subsequent Finals were promoted more on both networks, but NBA-related advertisements on ABC were still down significantly from promotions on NBC. According to the Sports Business Daily, NBA promos took up 3 minutes and 55 seconds of airtime on ABC during the week of May 23, 2004, compared to 2 minutes and 45 seconds for the Indy 500. Promotions for the Indianapolis 500 outnumbered promotions for the NBA Finals 14:9 from 9:00 pm to 11:00 pm during that week.
NBC Olympic broadcasts (1964, 1988–present [summer]; 1972, 2002–present [winter])
NBC was the inaugural Olympic broadcaster at the 1964 Tokyo Summer Olympics. They later broadcast the 1972 Winter Olympics. NBC brought the broadcast rights to start with the 1988 Summer Olympics, and would obtain rights to broadcast the Winter Olympics starting in 2002. NBCUniversal (a division of Comcast which operates NBC and its cable networks) holds the broadcasting rights for the Olympics until 2032. Since 2000, NBC has received criticism over its tape-delaying practice, which has gotten many complaints from many viewers, yet in 1992, the then-NBC Sports producer Terry O'Neil coined the term "possibly live" for NBC's practices to tape delay live events as if they were live. Some examples include the Women's Gymnastics event during the 2016 Summer Olympics in order to "juice the numbers". In the 2010 Winter Olympics, NBC aired no alpine skiing events in order to showcase high-profile events. Many viewers have expressed outrage, including U.S. senators during the 2010 Winter games, and people were forced to use VPN servers to access the BBC and in Canada, CTV (for the 2010 Winter Games and 2012 Summer Games), and the CBC (for the 2014 Winter Games and 2016 Summer Games) to view them live.

NBC has also frequently been criticized for airing the Olympics as if it is more of a reality television program instead of a live sports event. One example of this includes cutting off a fall from Russian gymnast Ksenia Afanasyeva, which NBC Sports chairman Mark Lazarus did "in the interest of time", although her routine took only 1 minute and 38 seconds. And according to The New York Times, he did this to create suspense on the U.S. Women's Gymnastics team.

In 2016, chief marketing officer John Miller held a press conference prior to the 2016 Summer Olympics about their formatting of NBC's Olympics coverage, citing that the Olympics were "not about the result, [but] about the journey. The people who watch the Olympics are not particularly sports fans. More women watch the Games than men, and for the women, they're less interested in the result and more interested in the journey. It's sort of like the ultimate reality show and mini-series wrapped into one". This led to criticism from the media; Linda Stasi of the New York Daily News claimed it to be "sexist nonsense" and a "pandering, condescending view of the millions of women viewers". Washington Post columnist Sally Jenkins suggested that "it insults the audience — but it sure does insult Olympic athletes, especially female athletes".

NBC was also criticized for frequently editing and tape-delaying the opening and closing ceremonies, with "context" as its main reason. In 2010, NBC aired the opening and closing ceremonies on a tape delay, even for viewers on Pacific Time, despite being 3 hours behind Eastern Time. During the closing ceremony, NBC went into a 65-minute intermission to air a series premiere of The Marriage Ref and local newscasts, and returning to the ceremony at 11:35 PM ET/PT. This spawned outbursts from upset viewers, especially on Twitter, when several performances were cut off.

In 2012, NBC cut a tribute to the victims of the July 7, 2005 London bombings in favor of a Ryan Seacrest interview with U.S. swimmer Michael Phelps during the opening ceremonies. Ultimately, this caused the hashtag #NBCFail to trend on Twitter. The network was criticized for cutting up to 27% of the closing ceremonies to air local newscasts and a sneak preview of the NBC sitcom Animal Practice.

In 2014, NBC also received criticism for cutting the video segments on the Olympic Torch relay and not showing the mascots. It also received criticism for cutting the Olympic Oaths and IOC President Thomas Bach's speech on discrimination and equality. It was also criticized for setting a 90-minute window to air the closing ceremonies. In addition, they used the times before and after the 90-minute window to air a sneak preview of another sitcom, Growing Up Fisher, at 10:30 PM ET/PT, and a documentary on Tonya Harding and Nancy Kerrigan which aired between 7 PM and 8:30 PM ET/PT. In 2016, NBC aired both of the ceremonies in a 1-hour delay (at 8 PM ET/PT) and it also drew criticism for the excessive number of advertisements it aired during the delayed ceremony, and cutting 38% of the closing ceremony.

NBC also received criticism for an alleged pro-American bias despite such bias being far less than other national Olympic broadcasters such as Canada and Russia, and for various comments made by commentators during the Olympics in 2016 and in the opening ceremony of the 2012 Olympics.
NHL on Fox (FoxTrax era)
Fox Sports's decision to implement a CGI-generated glowing hockey puck during their live coverage of the National Hockey League from 1996 to 1998 drew ire from sports fans, who derided the move as a gimmick. Greg Wyshinski called the glowing puck one of the worst ideas in sports history in his book Glow Pucks and Ten-Cent Beer: The 101 Worst Ideas in Sports History.
Olympics Triplecast (1992)
Even before the 1992 Summer Olympics started, many criticized the business model. On July 16, nine days before the opening ceremony, one Philadelphia Inquirer writer called it "the biggest marketing disaster since New Coke". The New York Times called it "sports TV's biggest flop" and said that NBC and Cablevision were "bereft in sanity" in operating it. By 1994, it was referred to as "the Heaven's Gate of television". Albert Kim, the editor of Entertainment Weekly, went on National Public Radio and called it "an unmitigated disaster for NBC". It lost about $100 million (half of which was covered by Cablevision under agreement) and shaped NBC's strategies in covering future Olympics.
Power Slap: Road To The Title (2023)
UFC president Dana White started the Power Slap League in 2022 and signed a deal with TBS to air an eight-episode reality competition series. Its January 2023 debut was delayed a week after White was filmed striking his wife in a nightclub.

The show got negative reception from critics and notable combat sport and political figures due to its violent nature and subsequent concerns over head trauma suffered by contestants. The New York Times wrote, "What's next, who can survive being run over by a tank? Knife fights on national television?" and criticized the league as "a display of pure punishment created for TV ratings, video views and money, money, money". Stuart Heritage of The Guardian commented that Power Slap "has caused a firestorm, not least because it is objectively stupid and dangerous, with slap fighters often ending up swollen and disfigured". Eric Blum of Deadspin called the "needlessly barbaric" show "the worst thing I've ever seen".

Despite airing after AEW Dynamite, Power Slap suffered from poor ratings and was not renewed by TBS for a second season. Former Nevada State Athletic Commission chairman Stephen Cloobeck resigned in December 2022 due to personal regret over his "mistake" of sanctioning the sport.
Thursday Night Football (2006–present)
Since 2006, when the National Football League started playing games on Thursday nights, the TV broadcasts have faced heavy criticism, including: hiring Bryant Gumbel as its first play-by-play announcer, difficulties getting cable providers to carry the NFL Network, poor quality games, a uniform scheme that made it very difficult for viewers with color blindness to tell teams apart, disrupting the league's weekly schedule in a way that potentially puts players at greater risk of injury, and saturating the market, driving down viewership of the league's Sunday and Monday games (the league is forbidden under federal law from televising games on Friday or Saturday for most of the regular season). On at least one occasion, the league has reportedly considered ending the package after its current contracts expire.
XFL on NBC, XFL on TNN and XFL on UPN (2001)
The three programs covering the original incarnation of the XFL are generally treated as one for the purposes of worst television show lists. The series ranked No. 3 on the 2002 TV Guide list of worst TV series of all time, #2 on ESPN's list of biggest sports flops, #21 on TV Guide's 2010 list of the biggest television blunders of all time, and #10 on Entertainment Weekly's list of the biggest bombs in television history. Despite the league's failure, both of its co-founders tried again nearly two decades later: Dick Ebersol with the Alliance of American Football in 2019 (which ran out of money midway through its only season), and Vince McMahon with another XFL in 2020. The second XFL had a longer enduring impact, as three of its teams have survived as members of the United Football League into 2026, after a series of sales and mergers.

== Talk shows ==
The Chevy Chase Show
A late night talk-show hosted by Chevy Chase that aired on Fox in 1993. It received negative reviews from critics, and ranked 16th on TV Guide's list of worst television shows and the same position on its list of biggest television blunders; former Fox chairwoman Lucie Salhany described it as "uncomfortable and embarrassing", and the series was canceled within six weeks of its debut.
The Jay Leno Show
Nightly primetime series hosted by Jay Leno following his departure from The Tonight Show to make way for Conan O’Brien. Airing at 10 p.m. ET/PT, ratings for the show cratered to where it began to have an adverse impact on NBC affiliates’ late local newscasts. NBC proposed moving the show to 11:35 p.m., thereby pushing O’Brien’s Tonight to 12:05. However, O’Brien refused and left the network entirely, giving Tonight back to Leno. Entertainment Weekly later called The Jay Leno Show television's "Biggest Bomb of All Time."
The Jeremy Kyle Show
British tabloid talk show which presented family disputes and the like. Often accused of treating its guests in an exploitative way, it was permanently scrapped in May 2019 when a guest died a week after appearing and failing a lie detector test on the show, apparently taking his own life.
The Jerry Springer Show
The trash TV show topped TV Guide magazine's 2002 list of "The Worst TV Shows Ever". The phrase "Jerry Springer Nation" began to be used by some who see the program as being a bad influence on the morality of the United States.
The Magic Hour
Soon after its debut, the series was panned by critics citing Earvin "Magic" Johnson's apparent nervousness as a host, his overly complimentary tone with his celebrity guests, and lack of chemistry with his sidekick, comedian Craig Shoemaker. The series was quickly retooled with Shoemaker being relegated to the supporting cast (and eventually fired for publicly stating the show was a disaster) which included comedian Steve White and announcer Jimmy Hodson. Comedian and actor Tommy Davidson was brought in as Johnson's new sidekick and Johnson interacted more with the show band leader Sheila E. The format of the show was also changed to include more interview time with celebrity guests. One vocal critic of The Magic Hour was Howard Stern, who was later booked as a guest for one episode as part of a stunt to boost ratings.
Maury
This tabloid talk show hosted by Maury Povich was dubbed by USA Today columnist Whitney Matheson as "the worst show on television" and "miles further down the commode than Jerry Springer". The A.V. Club wrote in 2016 that "Maury has been lowering the daytime TV bar for 25 years" by "ruthlessly exploiting the misery and misfortune of its guests for ratings".

== Variety and sketch comedy shows ==
The ½ Hour News Hour
Fox News Channel's satirical news comedy show was criticized for its obvious intent to imitate Comedy Central's The Daily Show from a more politically conservative slant. The show's initial two episodes received generally poor reviews. MetaCritic's television division gave The 1/2 Hour News Hour pilots a score of 12 out of 100, making it the lowest rated television production ever reviewed on the site. Business Insider ranked it #1 on its list of "The 50 worst TV shows in modern history, according to critics".
Australia's Naughtiest Home Videos
The series was canceled by its network midway through its first airing. Kerry Packer, Australian media magnate and owner of the broadcaster Nine Network, saw the show while out at dinner with friends, and reportedly phoned Nine central control personally, ordering them to "Get that shit off the air!" The network complied and immediately replaced it with reruns of Cheers, citing "technical difficulties". Packer arrived at the network the next day and again referred to the show as "disgusting and offensive shit". The show itself largely consisted of videos involving crude sexual content interspersed with off-color jokes from the show's host, former 2MMM morning host "Uncle" Doug Mulray. The show would not be seen in its entirety until 2008, three years after Packer's death.
Ben Elton Live From Planet Earth
Live From Planet Earth debuted on Channel Nine on 8 February 2011, in the 9:30 pm timeslot. During the broadcast of the first episode, reaction on Twitter was hostile, with many users speculating the show would be axed. Reviews of the first episode were largely negative. Colin Vickery of the Herald Sun called it "an early contender for worst show of the year", and Amanda Meade of The Australian called it "a screaming, embarrassing failure". The Age's Karl Quinn stated there was "more to like than dislike" about the show.
Osbournes Reloaded
This variety show was universally panned by critics, with Roger Catlin of the Hartford Courant even going so far as to call it the "worst variety show ever" and Tom Shales of The Washington Post labeling it "Must-Flee TV". It was canceled after one episode, which itself was cut from 60 to 35 minutes prior to air; 26 affiliates had refused to air the first show or buried it in overnight graveyard slots, and Fox had barely convinced a group of 19 other stations to drop its plans to do the same. Rolling Stone named it one of the 12 worst TV shows of all time.
Pink Lady (also known as Pink Lady and Jeff)
The series ranked No. 35 on TV Guide's Fifty Worst TV Shows of All Time list. The series, which featured Japanese musical duo Pink Lady struggling awkwardly through American disco hits and sketch comedy (as both spoke very little English), was moved to the Friday night death slot after one episode and killed off after five episodes. (A sixth episode was unaired at the time but later included in a DVD release).
Rosie Live
This NBC variety special hosted by comedian and activist Rosie O'Donnell on the day before Thanksgiving 2008 received almost universally negative reviews from critics. The Los Angeles Times critic Mary McNamara wrote, "For those of us who are, and remain, Rosie fans, who think The View will never quite recover from her departure, who think her desire to resurrect the variety show was, and is, a great idea, disappointment does not even begin to describe it". TV Guide critic Matt Roush panned the show as "dead on arrival", while Variety wrote "If Rosie O'Donnell and company were consciously determined to strangle the rebirth of variety shows in the crib, they couldn't have done a better job of it than this pre-holiday turkey". The show had been cleared for a tentative January 2009 launch as a regular series, but the show's poor reception led to the cancellation of those plans.
Saturday Night Live with Howard Cosell
In interviews, director Don Mischer remembered the show as hectic and unprepared. He recalled the time that executive producer Roone Arledge discovered that Lionel Hampton was in New York, and invited the musician to appear on the show an hour before it was set to go on air. The show fared poorly among critics and audiences alike, with TV Guide calling it "dead on arrival, with a cringingly awkward host". Alan King, the show's "executive in charge of comedy", later admitted that it was difficult to turn Cosell into a variety show host, saying that he "made Ed Sullivan look like Buster Keaton". Saturday Night Live with Howard Cosell was canceled on January 17, 1976, after only 18 episodes. A year later, the NBC sketch show Saturday Night finally got permission to use the name Saturday Night Live, and hired many cast members who worked on the ABC version (including Bill Murray, who was hired after Chevy Chase left).
The Tom Green Show
This comedy show written by and starring controversial Canadian comedian Tom Green was ranked No. 41 on TV Guide's 50 Worst TV Shows of All Time list. In 2001, Green also produced the film Freddy Got Fingered, which featured a similar style of humor and is also considered one of the worst films of all time to the point of winning the Golden Raspberry Award for Worst Picture.
Turn-On
Only one partial episode of this 1969 ABC sketch comedy show aired, as it was canceled only ten minutes into its broadcast due to its off-color content. The show was ranked 27th on TV Guide's "50 Worst TV Shows of All Time", and What Were They Thinking?: The 100 Dumbest Events in Television History ranked it at number 25.

The first and only aired episode of Turn-On

The Wilton North Report
Almost from the outset, creative differences arose between the writing team, executive producer Barry Sand, and hosts Phil Cowan and Paul Robins. The hosts thought the writers' material was too sophisticated for mass audiences, and frequently not very funny. The writers thought Cowan and Robins were ignorant, and felt uncomfortable writing for them.

Sand tried to make peace, seeking material that Cowan and Robins would feel comfortable with while encouraging the hosts to tone down their shrill delivery. Pre-debut rehearsals did not impress Sand or Fox executives. On November 29, 1987, the night before the show's scheduled premiere, they decided to push it back to give the crew extra time to gel (the hosts and writers had been together less than a week). Sand also scrapped the opening news review segment, believing it did not mesh with Cowan and Robin's friendly approach, while Fox objected to its crude humor.

When Wilton North finally premiered on December 11, 1987, Clifford Terry of the Chicago Tribune said it took a smug, studious approach to its subject material, while Ken Tucker of the Philadelphia Inquirer thought the "video version of Spy magazine" lacked "genuinely amusing rudeness".

Later episodes relied on long-form videos and feature reporting, such as a report on a dominatrix who specialized in corporal punishment, and a feature on a South Carolina high school basketball team that hadn't won a game in five years (though they pulled off a win when a Wilton North crew filmed them in action). The idea was to have Cowan and Robins serve as presenters and offer comments on what was being shown. Staff writer and commentator Paul Krassner would also be on hand to introduce and discuss "underground videos" with the hosts. Krassner, in what he would later term a "practice" segment, discussed the highlights of 1987 with Cowan and Robins on the January 1 broadcast, with the possibility that such analyses would become permanent the following week (a possibility Krassner was thrilled about, he would recall in a February 1988 Los Angeles Times piece about his time at Wilton North). By then, Fox's affiliates demanded that the show be canceled immediately.

When Fox announced Wilton North's cancellation on January 5, 1988, network president Jamie Kellner called the show "a bit too ambitious". The show's 21st and final episode aired on January 8, 1988.

== See also ==
- List of television series canceled after one episode
- List of television series canceled before airing an episode
- List of films considered the worst
- Low culture
- Hate-watching
- List of television shows considered the best
