= Jane Shaw (Scottish author) =

Scottish children's writer (1910–2000)

- Born: 3 December 1910; Glasgow
- Died: 19 November 2000 (aged 89); Isle of Arran
- Occupation: Writer

Jane Shaw (3 December 1910 – 19 November 2000), born Jean Bell Shaw Patrick, was a Scottish author of fiction for children and young adults. From 1939 to 1969 she appeared with 40 books and numerous short stories. She is best remembered as the author of the "Susan" series.

== Early life ==
Jean Bell Shaw Patrick was born in Glasgow on 3 December 1910, the daughter of John Patrick and Margaret Shaw Patrick. Her father was a medical doctor. She was tutored at home by a governess until the age of eight, when she entered Park School on nearby Lynedoch Street. In her last two years at the school, she edited its magazine, the Park Chronicle. At the University of Glasgow she graduated with a Second Class Honours in English Literature and Language in 1932. She then spent a year in London at the Maria Grey Training College for teaching.

== Career ==
Instead of teaching, Shaw took her first job at the Times Book Club in London. She was then offered a job at William Collins, Sons, where the editor of children's books, Jocelyn Oliver, recognized her talent and encouraged her to write a story. The result was her first book, Breton Holiday, published in 1939. Her house in Dulwich was bombed in World War II and she moved in with friends in Bath and Kent. She continued to write through wartime disruption and the births of two children: a further three books appeared during the war. After the war, several of her short stories were adapted for broadcasting on BBC's Children's Hour.

The family move to Johannesburg in 1952 lay behind Venture to South Africa, telling of the upheaval a British family faces moving overseas. In Johannesburg, she worked at the Children's Book Shop and continued writing books and short stories. Her popular "Susan" series of books has the title character staying in London and having adventures with her cousins, while her parents live in Africa.

Shaw's books became collectibles after she stopped writing in 1970; some were reissued after her death.

== Personal life ==
In 1938, Jean Shaw married Robert Evans, an accountant, whom she had known since childhood. They set up home in Dulwich Village, London. The Evans had two children. In 1952 her husband was offered an accountancy position in Johannesburg, and the family moved there.

In 1978, after Robert Evans's retirement, the family returned to Scotland, setting up home on the Isle of Arran, which had been a favourite holiday destination in her childhood. Her husband died 1987. Jean Evans died in 2000 after a short illness, at age 89. She was buried beside her husband, at the Shiskine cemetery on Arran. Her literary and business papers, including manuscripts of unpublished works, are archived in the National Library of Scotland.

== Selected publications ==
The Holiday series:

- Breton Holiday (1939) reissued in 1953 as Breton Adventure
- Bernese Holiday (1940) reissued in 1953 as Bernese Adventure
- Highland Holiday (1942)

The Moochers series:

- The Moochers (1950)
- The Moochers Abroad (1951)

The Penny series:

- Penny Foolish (1953)
- Twopence Coloured (1954)
- Threepenny Bit (1955)
- Fourpenny Fair (1956)
- Fivepenny Mystery (1958)
- Crooked Sixpence (1958)

The Thomas series:

- Looking After Thomas (1957)
- Willow Green Mystery (1958)
- The Tall Man (1960)

The Northmead series:

- New House at Northmead (1961)
- Northmead Nuisance (1964)

Dizzy and Alison series:

- Anything Can Happen (1964)
- Nothing Happened After All (1965)

Susan series:

- Susan Pulls the Strings (1952)
- Susan's Helping Hand (1955)
- Susan Rushes In (1956)
- Susan Interferes (1957)
- Susan at School (1958)
- Susan Muddles Through (1960)
- Susan's Trying Term (1961)
- No Trouble for Susan (1962)
- Susan's Kind Heart (1965)
- Where is Susan? (1968)
- A Job for Susan (1969)

Individual titles:

- House of the Glimmering Light (1943)
- Magic Ships (1943)
- The Crew of the Belinda (1945)
- Farm Friends (1953)
- Puppy Tales (1953)
- Venture to South Africa (1960)
- Crooks Tour (1962)
- Left-Handed Tumfy (1962), illustrated by Gwyneth Mamlok
