= Sam Singer =

American animator and producer (1912–2001)

- Singer in 1950
- Born: Samuel Singer; August 27, 1912
- Died: January 25, 2001 (aged 88)
- Occupations: TV animator and producer
- Years active: 1930s–1975
- Notable work: Adventures of Pow Wow; The Adventures of Paddy the Pelican; Bucky and Pepito
- Parent(s): Abraham and Ida Singer

Samuel Singer (August 27, 1912 – January 25, 2001) was an American animator and animation producer. He is best known as executive producer of Adventures of Pow Wow, a cartoon which also later appeared as a segment in early episodes of Captain Kangaroo. He also directed The Adventures of Paddy the Pelican and produced Bucky and Pepito. Animation historian Jerry Beck has referred to Singer as "the Ed Wood of animation" for his very low-budget and generally ill-reviewed cartoons.

== Career ==
Sam Singer was born on August 27, 1912, the son of Abraham and Ida Singer. He was Jewish. In his early career, he worked at Walt Disney Productions before leaving to pursue his animation career. Prior to that, Singer also worked for various other animation studios located in Hollywood in the 1930s, moving to Chicago in the 1940s. His first TV show was titled Uncle Mistletoe, which aired from 1948 to 1952. In 1957, Singer created Adventures of Pow Wow, which received generally negative reviews from critics, naming it as one of the worst television series ever made of all time. He also created and executive produced The Adventures of Paddy the Pelican, Bucky and Pepito, and Courageous Cat and Minute Mouse. His final cartoon that he ever worked on was Sinbad Jr. and His Magic Belt. Instead of the show being created by Singer, he served as executive producer while William Hanna and Joseph Barbera (founders of Hanna-Barbera along with George Sidney) created the show due to being unable to fulfill schedule demands. The negative reception of his shows led to his retirement after Sinbad Jr. and His Magic Belt concluded in 1966.

== Death ==
Sam Singer died on January 25, 2001, at the age of 88.

== Filmography ==
=== Television ===
- Uncle Mistletoe (1948–1952)
- Paddy the Pelican (1950) - Creator
- The Adventures of Paddy the Pelican (1954) - Creator, writer, director, and voice actor
- Adventures of Pow Wow (1957–1958) - Creator and director
- Trips the Trapper (1959) - Executive producer
- Bucky and Pepito (1959–1960) - Executive producer
- Courageous Cat and Minute Mouse (1960–1962) - Executive producer
- Sinbad Jr. and His Magic Belt (1965–1966) - Executive producer

=== Film ===
- Tubby the Tuba (1975) - Animation supervisor
