= The Adventures of Paddy the Pelican =

1950 American animated television series

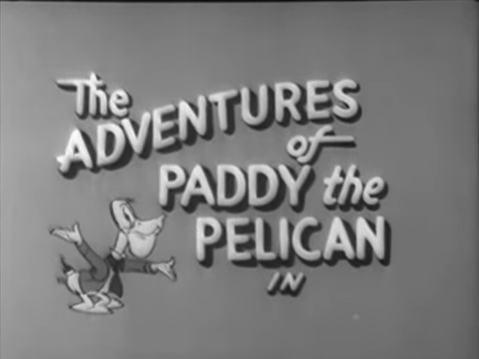
- Genre: Adventure; Comedy
- Created by: Sam Singer
- Directed by: Sam Singer
- Voices of: Sam Singer
- Theme music composer: Charles A. Cavallo
- Country of origin: United States
- Original language: English
- No. of episodes: 6

Production
- Running time: 5 minutes
- Production company: Tempe-Toons (referred to as "Medallion Productions" during the end titles)

Original release
- Network: ABC
- Release: October 23 – October 29, 1954

The Adventures of Paddy the Pelican is an American animated television series created by Sam Singer, that debuted on local stations in Chicago during the 1950s.

== Description ==
In the cartoon, Paddy's adventures were presented in comic strip drawings done by Sam Singer. The show appeared on the ABC network in the fall of 1950, but for only one month. The show aired on the ABC television network weekdays between 5:15 and 5:30pm from September 11, 1950 to October 13, 1950. Singer had also started producing a newspaper, Paddy Pelican Junior Journal.

The show is noted for its pencil tests that were never finalized to the actual animation, reused animation, rambling and apparently improvised voiceovers by the creator himself, a muffled and poorly synchronized soundtrack made by an organ, and general low-budget problems. The only music is a few chords played on an organ, although the title card is accompanied by a man making noises apparently intended to sound like a pelican squawking. All characters were voiced by Sam Singer.

Singer, who worked for Disney and other Hollywood animation studios, also produced a local children's television show, based on the Marshall Field's character "Uncle Mistletoe", as well as other early animated shows.

== Episodes ==
All six full episodes of The Adventures of Paddy the Pelican, shown chronologically

No.	Title	Running time (in minutes)	Original release date
1	"Piggy Bank Robbery"	5:03	October 23, 1954
Paddy is observing Kenny Crow's odd banking habits. Kenny hides his savings in a piggy bank that is stashed in a secret panel of his house. But the evil Freddie Fox discovers the hiding place and conspires to steal the money while framing Paddy for the crime. Freddie plants pelican-shaped muddy footprints across Kenny's floor – and Kenny reacts to the theft by blaming Paddy. Now Paddy must clear his name and figure out who the real culprit is, before he is sent behind bars.
2	"Two Wet Bears"	5:15	October 25, 1954
Amos and Buster the bears are swimming in the ocean when they discover an abandoned boat. A thunderstorm comes and wrecks the boat on the island, where the boat's owner, Beachcomber Bill, threatens to eat the two bears for wrecking his boat. A passing Paddy assists the two bears in getting off the island and out of danger.
3	"The Land of More"	5:17	October 26, 1954
A boy wants to have a bigger balloon, so a mischievous elf makes it so big that it flies him all the way to "The Land of More", where things don't go the way he hoped.: This is the only short that doesn't feature Paddy.
4	"Pirate Pete"	6:01	October 27, 1954
Joco and Mary help the Indians get their gold back from Pirate Pete.: Paddy only makes a brief cameo at the end of the short.
5	"Swania Foiled Again"	5:26	October 28, 1954
When the 50 bushels of corn suddenly disappears on the day they were to repay the fictional country Swania, Paddy does some detective work to find the culprit so they don't lose their land.
6	"Plum Valley"	5:39	October 29, 1954
Paddy and a pie maker go to Plum Valley when there's a plum shortage, only to have trouble getting out of the village afterwards, so Paddy figures out a way to get them out of this.

== Merchandise ==
Sam Singer had a coloring book published called The Paddy Pelican Story and Coloring Mak-A-Book. The Michigan State University Library currently has a copy of this rare coloring book in their possession.

== Reception ==
This show gained infamy for appearing on Jerry Beck's Worst Cartoons Ever. On DVD, two episodes of this show appeared on the DVD. Beck states that he could find evidence that an animated adaptation was aired on TV, although there is no evidence that the Paddy the Pelican character began in 1950 as a local TV puppet show on Chicago's WENR-TV (now WLS-TV), with Helen York and Ray Suber as puppeteers.

== See also ==
- List of television shows notable for negative reception

== Bibliography ==
- Hollis, Tim (2001). Hi There, Boys and Girls! America's Local Children's TV Programs. University Press of Mississippi. ISBN 978-1-578-06396-3. via Project MUSE (subscription required)
- Okuda, Ted; Mulqueen, Jack (2004). The Golden Age of Chicago Children's Television. Lake Claremont Press. ISBN 978-1-893-12117-1.
