= Jot (TV series) =

- Also known as: Jot the Dot
- Genre: Animated television series
- Created by: Ruth Byers; Ted Perry
- Directed by: Paul M. Stevens
- Country of origin: United States
- Original language: English
- No. of episodes: 30

Production
- Executive producer: Southern Baptist Radio and Television Commission
- Producers: Keitz and Herndon; Dan Peeler Productions (Dallas 1980-1981)

Original release
- Network: Syndicated
- Release: January 8, 1965 – July 18, 1974

Jot (also known as Jot the Dot) is an American animated children's television program that originally aired from 1965 to 1974, and again later from 1980 to 1981. The series consisted of 30 four-minute episodes, which were syndicated between 1965 and the 1980s. Jot was executive produced by the Southern Baptist Radio and Television Commission (RATC) as a Baptist version of Davey and Goliath due to the RATC considering Goliath, the talking dog, blasphemous.

== History ==
Not only one of the earliest religious animated series (another was Davey and Goliath), but presumably the first preschool-aimed animated television series, it was created by Ruth Byers, a graduate of Baylor University, and Ted Perry, a writer at the RATC. Both had a background connected to the Dallas Theater Center, with Byers having been director of children's productions. The pair was commissioned by Dr. Paul Stevens, president of the RATC, to develop a television show that would provide simple moral lessons for young children. Keitz & Herndon, an American television production company, worked on Jot, alongside animator Tom Young. Production of the first episodes began in 1959, with the first episode released in 1965. The style of the show was kept deliberately simple, both as a cost-cutting measure (the budget for the early episodes was never more than $25,000, and that amount dropped over time), and to prevent the design from interfering with the delivery of the message.

The main character, Jot, is a white circle with simple facial features (similar to a smiley face), hands and feet. Jot's color and shape would change in response to the struggles presented. This was meant to represent changes in a child's temperament or emotional state, "somewhat like a thermostat," according to one critic. His hands and feet are only seen when he is still; when he is in motion, they disappear. Jot does not have a nose. Jot would sometimes be accompanied by Tug (voiced by Ed Ruth), a "bad" character who would learn a moral lesson in the end.

The voice of Jot was provided by two different women, Lou Kelly (1965–1967, 1968, and 1981) and Colleen Collins (1967).

The series premiered on Peppermint Place, a Sunday children's show produced locally at WFAA-TV in Dallas, and later on The Children's Hour on WBAP-TV (now KXAS-TV) in Fort Worth. The episodes were eventually syndicated throughout the world, translated into 19 different languages. They were also a favorite of Sunday School programs. The response to the program was a volume of over 175,000 letters from children, requiring a volunteer group from 22 churches to write responses. The series remained in regular production until 1974. Additional episodes were produced for the 1980 to 1981 season.

Jot the Dot later was owned by FamilyNet Television and was utilized as the network's mascot for its "Families on FamilyNet" programming block until 2014. The Jot animation was updated for new television spots and Web promotions, and the original cartoon shorts were formerly available at the FamilyNet website.

== Legacy and reception ==
It was also broadcast in other countries, like Chile, as part of an Evangelical television program named Puertas abiertas on TVN, localized as Puntito.

The series was parodied in the Animaniacs (2020) season 2 episode "The Warner's Vault".

In Children's Television: The First Thirty-Five Years, George W. Woolery writes, "The abstract messages captivated and inspired children far beyond anticipation, requiring a volunteer group from twenty-two churches to answer the 175,000 letters that the films prompted."

It was also featured on the Christian variety show Joy Junction.
