= Bucky and Pepito =

American animated television series (1958–1960)

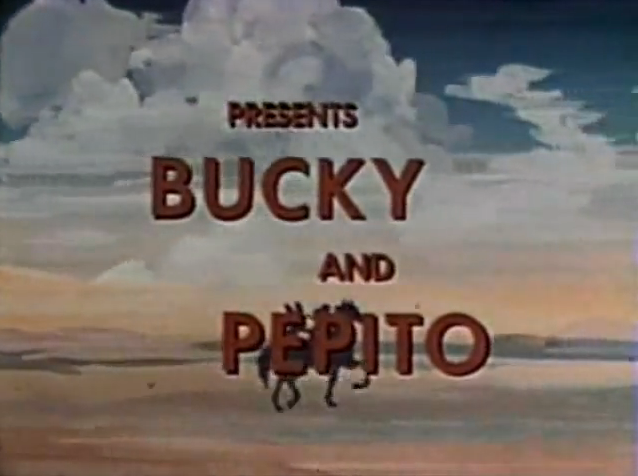
- Created by: Sam Singer
- Directed by: Reuben Timmins; Edwin Rehberg
- Voices of: Dal McKennon
- Theme music composer: Johnny Holiday
- Country of origin: United States
- Original language: English
- No. of episodes: 36

Production
- Executive producer: Sam Singer
- Production company: Trans-Artists Productions

Original release
- Network: Syndication
- Release: September 8, 1959 – March 22, 1960

Bucky and Pepito is a Western-themed American animated television series produced by Sam Singer.

The series is about two young boys. Bucky is an imaginative American child who wears a cowboy hat, and his Mexican friend Pepito is an inventor.

All episodes of the series have entered the public domain due to failure to renew the copyright.

== Premise ==
The series centers around the escapades of two adventurous boys: Bucky, an imaginative American child sporting a cowboy hat, dreams of becoming a legendary cowboy, and Pepito, his clever Mexican friend and inventor, is always ready with a new gadget to help them on their quests. Each episode focuses on their slapstick-filled attempts to outsmart and get rid of the villain of the week (usually a pesky character), using Pepito's gadgets and their wild schemes, leading to different chaotic situations. The show is full of slapstick gags and adventurous mishaps as they deal with the troublemakers in their Western world.

== Cast ==
- Dal McKennon as Bucky and Pepito

== Episodes ==
No.	Title	Original release date
1	"Cal's Mis' Steak"	September 8, 1959
2	"The Coyote Catcher"	September 15, 1959
3	"Crazy Car Capers"	September 22, 1959
4	"Dog Catcher Daze"	September 29, 1959
5	"Cal Coyote Flies Again"	October 6, 1959
6	"Flippin' Over Flapjacks"	October 13, 1959
7	"Flyin' High"	October 20, 1959
8	"Hi-Flyin' Goat"	October 27, 1959
9	"Hot Diggity Dog"	November 3, 1959
10	"The Howlin' Coyote"	November 10, 1959
11	"Hunters Dilemma"	November 17, 1959
12	"Jumpin' Frijoles"	November 24, 1959
13	"A Kingfishy Tale"	December 8, 1959
14	"The Magic Penny"	December 15, 1959
15	"Mambo Rhythm"	December 22, 1959
16	"No Luck Duck"	December 29, 1959
17	"Cat Nappin' Around"	December 29, 1959
18	"Dinosaur Daze"	December 29, 1959
19	"Out of This World"	December 29, 1959
20	"Pony Pal"	December 29, 1959
21	"The Fastest Bird Alive"	December 29, 1959
22	"The Sheepish Coyote"	December 29, 1959
23	"Them's My Boys"	December 29, 1959
24	"Unlucky Horseshoes"	December 29, 1959
25	"Fresh Fish"	December 29, 1959
26	"The Lion Tamer"	January 5, 1960
27	"The Pancake Taking Cure"	January 12, 1960
28	"Pet Duck"	January 19, 1960
29	"Rustlin' Coyote"	January 26, 1960
30	"Sailor's Story"	February 2, 1960
31	"Stooges"	February 9, 1960
32	"Texas Jack and the Bean Patch"	February 16, 1960
33	"Time Machine"	February 23, 1960
34	"The Vexin' Texan"	March 8, 1960
35	"Watch Dog for Hire"	March 15, 1960
36	"The Wandering Elephant"	March 22, 1960

== Production ==
Production took place in a tight timeframe, with animators working long hours to meet episode deadlines. The team employed limited animation techniques, reusing backgrounds and character models to save both time and resources. Sound effects and music were sourced from existing and free-use libraries, enhancing the series' supposed energetic tone without incurring additional costs.

== Release ==
Bucky and Pepito premiered on television in 1959, launching as part of a Saturday morning cartoon lineup aimed at entertaining young audiences. From what little is known, the series struggled to find a dedicated audience and it found itself overshadowed by other animated programs that offered higher production values and more relatable characters. The network's support dwindled as ratings dropped, leading to reduced marketing efforts and less promotion. Ultimately, Bucky and Pepito was canceled after a single season due to its lackluster performance and ongoing criticism.

== Reception ==
Two episodes appeared on a compilation DVD of the worst cartoons ever made, and it was described by Harry McCracken as setting "a standard for awfulness that no contemporary TV cartoon has managed to surpass". Pepito's depiction has been criticized as conforming to racist stereotypes.

== See also ==
- List of television shows notable for negative reception
