= Adventures of Pow Wow =

American animated cartoon

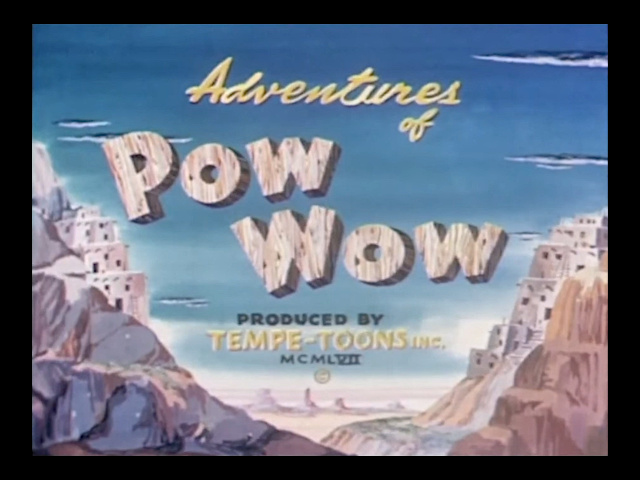
- The series' opening card.
- Genre: Western
- Created by: Sam Singer
- Written by: Ed Nofziger; Ben Hardaway (4 episodes)
- Directed by: Sam Singer
- Presented by: Leo Minskoff; Walter Minskoff
- Theme music composer: Monty Kelly
- Country of origin: United States
- Original language: English
- No. of episodes: 45

Production
- Executive producer: Leon Marcus
- Animator: Tom Baron
- Running time: 5 minutes
- Production company: Tempe-Toons

Original release
- Network: CBS
- Release: 1957 – 1958

Adventures of Pow Wow is an American animated cartoon that was broadcast on the Captain Kangaroo show during the 1950s. The series is in the public domain due to failure in copyright renewal.

== Plot ==
The cartoon features the pre-adolescent Native American boy Pow Wow, as well as the tribe's medicine man, and a Native American girl who is a friend of Pow Wow's. The cartoons often center on Pow Wow's discovery of an animal, hurt or otherwise, and his attempts to protect the forest and wildlife from various threats. When Pow Wow needs help in these missions, he seeks counsel from the wise medicine man.

== Broadcast history ==
The cartoon first aired during the children's show Captain Kangaroo in 1957 and was syndicated by Screen Gems. It continued on Captain Kangaroo as a series of five-minute episodes until 1958. The cartoons were then once again syndicated and appeared locally in New York and Chicago.

== Episodes ==
No.	Title	Directed by	Written by	Original release date
1	"Pow Wow and the Hungry Frog"	Sam Singer	Ed Nofziger	1957
2	"Pow Wow and the Grasshopper"	Sam Singer	Ed Nofziger	1957
3	"All's Well That Ends Well"	TBD	TBD	1957
4	"Ruffy Rabbit and His Lucky Foot"	TBD	TBD	1957
5	"The Snowshoe Rabbit"	Sam Singer	Ed Nofziger	1957
6	"Sleepy Head"	TBD	TBD	1957
7	"Pow Wow and His Lucky Duck"	Sam Singer	Ed Nofziger	1957
8	"Pow Wow Builds a Canoe"	Sam Singer	Ed Nofziger	1957
9	"The Beaver Boys"	TBD	TBD	1957
10	"The Little Builders"	TBD	TBD	1957
11	"Playin' Possum"	Sam Singer	Ed Nofziger	1957
12	"The Bad Egg"	Sam Singer	Ben Hardaway	1957
13	"The Magic Spigot"	Sam Singer	Ed Nofziger	1957
14	"Why Burly Bear Likes Honey"	TBD	TBD	1957
15	"The Magic Powder"	TBD	TBD	1957
16	"Pow Wow Gets Even"	Sam Singer	Ed Nofziger	1957
17	"The Giant Crow"	Sam Singer	Ed Nofziger	1957
18	"Pow Wow in Bear Trouble"	Sam Singer	Ed Nofziger	1957
19	"Kangaroo Mouse"	Sam Singer	Ed Nofziger	1957
20	"Pow Wow's Picnic"	TBD	TBD	1957
21	"The Beginning of the Fire"	TBD	TBD	1957
22	"How the Bear Got a Short Tail"	TBD	TBD	1957
23	"How the Fox Got His White-Tipped Tail"	TBD	TBD	1957
24	"Pow Wow and the Shooting Star"	TBD	TBD	1957
25	"Pow Wow and the Stork"	Sam Singer	Ed Nofziger	1957
26	"Percy Pelican's Fish Dinner"	Sam Singer	Ed Nofziger	1957
27	"Pow Wow and the Lil' Medicine Man"	Sam Singer	Ben Hardaway	1958
28	"The Baby Sitter"	Sam Singer	Ed Nofziger	1958
29	"How Ruffy Rabbit Got His Hop"	TBD	TBD	1958
30	"The Tail of a Tornado"	TBD	TBD	1958
31	"Pow Wow and the Junior Medicine Man"	Sam Singer	Ed Nofziger	1958
32	"Turtle Trouble"	Sam Singer	Ed Nofziger	1958
33	"Pow Wow and the Magic Moccasins"	Edwin Rehberg	Ben Hardaway	1958
34	"Pow Wow the Duck Hunter"	TBD	TBD	1958
35	"The Flying Saucer"	TBD	TBD	1958
36	"The Pogo Stick"	Sam Singer	Ed Nofziger	1958
37	"Pow Wow in Frog Jumping"	TBD	TBD	1958
38	"The Treasure Hunt"	Sam Singer	Ed Nofziger	1958
39	"The Eagle Feathers"	Sam Singer	Ed Nofziger	1958
40	"Don't Fence Me In"	TBD	TBD	1958
41	"The Vagabond Mouse"	Sam Singer	Ed Nofziger	1958
42	"Burro'ing Trouble"	TBD	TBD	1958
43	"Pow Wow's Day of Labor"	Edwin Rehberg	Ben Hardaway	1958
44	"Pow Wow Wins by a Head"	Sam Singer	Ed Nofziger	1958
45	"The Uranium Hunt"	Sam Singer	Ed Nofziger	1958

"Playin' Possum" (1957)
