= First Night 2013 with Jamie Kennedy =

2012 New Year's Eve television special

- Genre: Television special
- Created by: Jamie Kennedy
- Presented by: Jamie Kennedy
- Country of origin: United States

Production
- Producer: Elie Samaha

Original release
- Network: KDOC-TV, KQCA-TV
- Release: December 31, 2012

First Night 2013 with Jamie Kennedy was a New Year's Eve television special in the United States that was hosted by comedian and television producer Jamie Kennedy. Broadcast live on December 31, 2012 from outside Grauman's Chinese Theatre in Hollywood, California, the special included comedy sketches, interviews with celebrities and others in attendance, and live musical performances by Macy Gray and Bone Thugs-n-Harmony. The special was aired locally on the Orange County-based independent station KDOC-TV, and was also broadcast by the Sacramento MyNetworkTV affiliate KQCA.

After its broadcast, First Night became infamous for its low quality, as exhibited in a montage of scenes from the special that became popular after being discovered by comedian Patton Oswalt. The special suffered from many technical problems (including microphone gaffes and communication issues), featured scenes described as being "surreal", the very New Year being counted in too late and spontaneously ended with an impromptu fight breaking out on stage over the credits.

Based on the montage, several media outlets declared First Night to be the "worst New Year's Eve special ever". Kennedy defended the special in an interview with The New York Times, by claiming that First Night was an "anti-New Year's Eve show" that was intentionally unrehearsed and unpredictable. The A.V. Club's Nathan Rabin would praise the special for meeting Kennedy's stated goal.

== Synopsis ==
Kennedy opened the special with a comedy monologue, which among others, included a joke relating to the "percentages" of 2012 (the 99%, 47%, and 8%—the score of his last film on Rotten Tomatoes), along with joking that because of Psy, the packaging of a fortune cookie would no longer be the only thing people think about when they hear the words "Asian rapper". The special was plagued with technical problems throughout the night: a camera shot of Kennedy lingering on-stage was shown at the beginning of an interview with Shannon Elizabeth by Stu Stone, and issues with walkie-talkies affected the level of communication between the show's crew (also leading to several occasions where Kennedy was unsure of whether the show was live). Although several fleeting expletives from open microphones were also broadcast during the special, they were also caused by technical faults and were not intentional. Jessi Cruickshank (who hosted The CW's game show Oh Sit! alongside Kennedy) interviewed guests throughout the show, such as Drake Bell and Olympic gold medalist Dawn Harper. As part of an interview outside a local nightclub, Bridget Marquardt was encouraged by Cruickshank to eat a Turkey Jalapeño burger from show sponsor Carl's Jr. in a sexually suggestive manner. Kennedy also starred in a pre-recorded comedy sketch promoting Commerce Casino; where he played a Mayan chief trying to win back his fortune by participating in a poker tournament.

Prior to the arrival of midnight, singer Macy Gray performed "I Try", along with a medley of other songs. Due to her slurred speech and an occurrence where she thought that the time was only 11:15 p.m. instead of 11:50 p.m., it was speculated by critics that Gray may have been drunk during the performance. Kennedy has personally denied that this was the case, however. During the countdown to 2013, Kennedy was unable to find a clock, and the cast's countdown to 2013 was completed 10 seconds late. Following midnight, the rap group Bone Thugs-n-Harmony performed their songs "1st of tha Month" and "Notorious Thugs". Near the end of the special, Kennedy interviewed a pair of African-American women (one of whom claimed her New Year's resolution was to "get rid of all my haters") and quipped to one of them that "going white" instead of "black" would "keep [her] vagina very tight", followed later by a comedy sketch involving puppets making jokes regarding rape. Whilst signing-off at the end of the show, Kennedy declared that the show was "ending with a fight"; as promised, a fight began to break out on-stage.

== Production ==
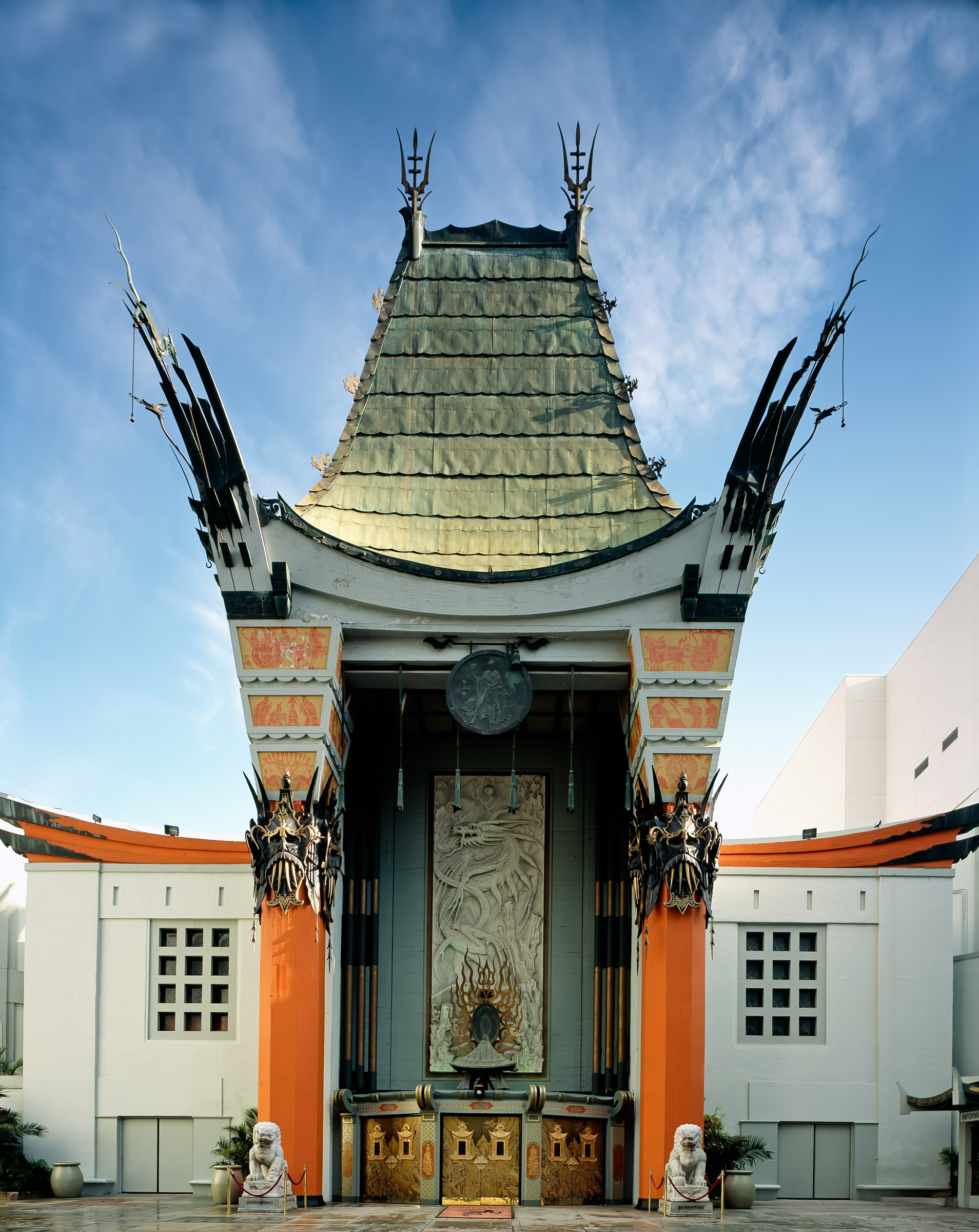
Grauman's Chinese Theatre

Kennedy suggested the idea of hosting a New Year's special on KDOC-TV in November 2012 whilst watching the Macy's Thanksgiving Day Parade with a friend from the station. Following Thanksgiving, he quickly used the final weeks of the year to attract sponsors and guests for the program (such as the restaurant chain Carl's Jr., which served as its primary sponsor). In planning the special, Kennedy was influenced by the style of Jerry Lewis's MDA telethon, promising a broadcast which would be "fun and spontaneous" and leave viewers guessing what would happen next. He intended First Night to be an "anti-New Year's Eve show" with an informal block party atmosphere, held at what he considered to be Hollywood's "apex of craziness", Hollywood Boulevard in front of Grauman's Chinese Theatre.

== Reception ==
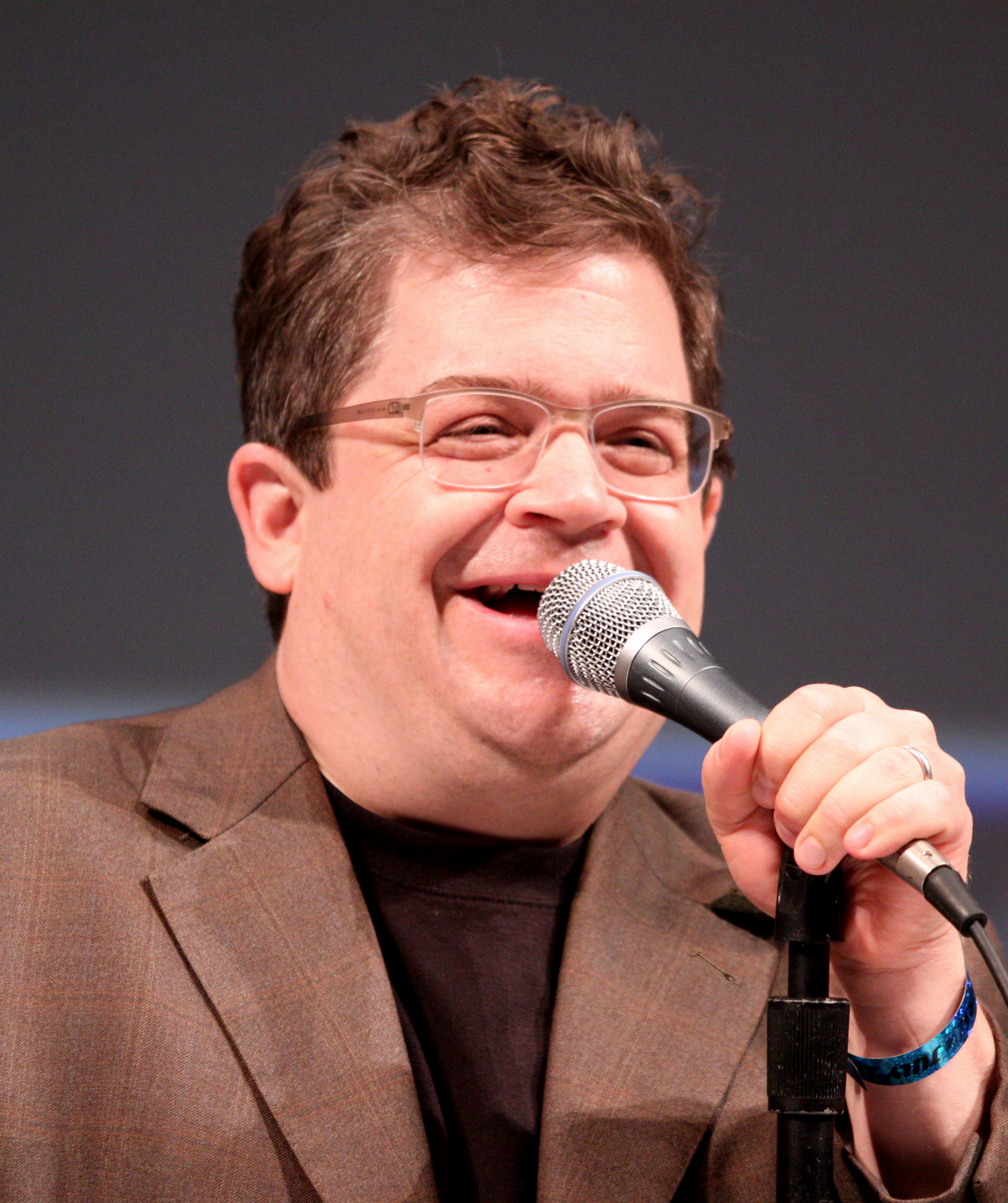
Footage from the special became popular following its discovery by comedian Patton Oswalt.

Following its broadcast, Burbank-based actor and comedian Shaun Broyls posted footage from the special on YouTube. When the footage was posted on Twitter by fellow comedian Patton Oswalt, it quickly became popular, and was picked up by a number of blogs and news outlets. Broyls himself believed that "there was no way that this broadcast was meant to turn out the way it turned out" due to the large number of technical problems that were seen throughout First Night, but acknowledged that the special may have a "rough charm" similar to that of B-movies or The Star Wars Holiday Special. Professional wrestler Adam Pearce attended the event in person, but did not notice any abnormalities aside from the fight at the end. Pearce did not rule out the possibility that certain aspects of the show were intentionally designed to increase the possibility of disorder.

The A.V. Club's Nathan Rabin dubbed the special The Jamie Kennedy Falling Apart At The Seams New Year's Eve 2013 Spectacular; he supported Kennedy's assertion that First Night was an antithesis to other similar specials, suggesting that "if [Dick Clark] is the trusted authority figure who made sure everything went swimmingly, Kennedy is more like the creepy uncle whose idea of discipline and order is making the 15-year-olds he hangs out with promise they’ll get good and drunk before playing with the illegal fireworks he’s bought them." Rabin criticized Kennedy's opening monologue for potentially being anti-comedy or just bad material, and his confrontational attitude towards the audience throughout the show. Jessi Cruickshank was critiqued for her "over-the-top" recognition of Drake Bell's nine Nickelodeon Kids' Choice Awards (which Rabin joked that, in the opinion of the show, was equivalent to winning an Academy Award, ESPY, Grammy, Nobel Prize, and Tony in the same year), and interviews with Dawn Harper and Bridget Marquardt that he felt were "clearly a set up for a plug for Carl’s Jr."

Kennedy was also panned for his Commerce Casino sketch, which Rabin felt was "racist in its grotesque minstrelsy of Native American culture", and not funny. He also felt that Macy Gray's performance was "shambling yet strangely majestic" (speculating that she, and the rest of the production staff, may have been drunk), and felt that the performance by Bone Thugs-n-Harmony would have been a "muddy, dispiriting dirge" even without a backing track. In conclusion, however, Rabin praised the special for its unexpectedly surreal nature, considering it "the least professional and most entertaining New Year’s Eve broadcast I have ever seen." In a December 2013 article highlighting other critically-panned New Year's Eve specials, it was remarked that in comparison to the other seven personalities highlighted (including Andy Williams and Paul Shaffer's stints on Happy New Year, America, Howard Stern, and Merv Griffin), "few hosts, though, have matched Jamie Kennedy's spectacular failure on the Orange County station KDOC last year", and concluded that "As 'Auld Lang Syne' played over on ABC, Kennedy reminded the world that some auld acquaintances really should be forgot."

== See also ==
- List of television shows notable for negative reception
- Live into 85 - UK New Year's Eve special which had a similarly poor reception
