= The Children's Hour (TV program) =

American television series

The Children's Hour is an American children's television program that aired locally on the Dallas-Fort Worth, Texas NBC affiliate, KXAS-TV (known as WBAP-TV when the show premiered), on Sunday mornings. It was a long-running program airing from 1970 to 1992, and was hosted by Bill Kelley with co-host Budd Kneisel for 22 years, taking over from show originator Johnny Hay in 1970.

== Overview ==
This program aired at 8 a.m. (CST) and lasted 1 hour—and briefly for 1.5 hours billed as "The Children's Hour ... and a Half." During a typical episode, Kelly would generally draw cartoons, read the Sunday comics page of the Fort Worth Star-Telegram, or introduce a cartoon, such as an episode of Davey and Goliath or JOT. He would also host recurring visitors from the Dallas Zoo and the Fort Worth Children's Museum, which later became Fort Worth Museum of Science and History. On many broadcasts, as the show neared its close, Kelley would say, "Now kids, we just have time for one more cartoon, then it will be time to leave for church."

When the NBC network began a Sunday edition of Today, the Children's Hour program moved to a Saturday-morning slot, where ratings declined as the show's length was reduced to 30 minutes, the time slot changed repeatedly, and the station chose to stop running animated programs in the surrounding Saturday-morning hours. The Children's Hour was cancelled in early 1992 concurrently with Kelley's departure from the local affiliate.
