= Sinbad Jr. and His Magic Belt =

- Directed by: Joseph Barbera; William Hanna; Rudy Cataldi; Reuben Timmins; Edwin Rehberg; Amby Paliwoda; Sid Marcus; Harvey Toombs
- Voices of: Dallas R. McKennon; Tim Matheson; Mel Blanc
- Theme music composer: Ted Nichols
- Country of origin: United States
- No. of episodes: 35 (103 segments)

Production
- Executive producer: Sam Singer
- Producers: James H. Nicholson and Samuel Z. Arkoff (for American International); Joseph Barbera and William Hanna
- Running time: 5 minutes
- Production companies: American International Pictures; Hanna-Barbera Productions

Original release
- Network: Syndication
- Release: September 11, 1965 – May 28, 1966

Sinbad Jr. and His Magic Belt is a series of five-minute cartoons that originally aired in first-run syndication between 1965 and 1966. The first series, The Adventures of Sinbad, Jr., was produced by the American International Television division of American International Pictures. Hanna-Barbera took over production and changed the title to Sinbad Jr. and His Magic Belt. These cartoons were shown during local children's television programming.

== Synopsis ==
Sinbad Jr. (voiced by Dallas R. McKennon in the American International cartoons and by Tim Matheson in the Hanna-Barbera cartoons) is the teenage son of Sinbad, the famous sailor. He travels around the world in his sailboat along with his parrot friend Salty (voiced by Mel Blanc in the Hanna-Barbera shorts), seeking adventure and wrongs to the right, fighting such villains as the Bluto-like Blubbo and the mad doctor Rotcoddam ("mad doctor" spelled backwards).

Sinbad Jr. gains the strength of 50 men whenever he tightens his magic belt, causing the diamond-shaped buckle to flash like lightning and temporarily transform him into a mighty muscleman.

== Production ==
The series was conceived by Sam Singer's Trans Artists Productions in 1960, with Dal McKennon voicing the title role. The Singer studio produced the initial episodes. American International Pictures (AIP), which had released the film The Magic Voyage of Sinbad, held rights to the "Sinbad" trademark for screen works, and distributed Singer's cartoons to television.

When Singer dropped out, AIP negotiated an agreement under which Hanna-Barbera would produce the remainder of the series, with Tim Matheson replacing McKennon. The syndicated package contained episodes produced by both studios.

Sinbad Jr. and His Magic Belt premiered in first-run syndication on September 11, 1965. The 103 five-minute shorts aired first-run through 1966 within children's television programming.

The series has since been renamed Sinbad Jr., the Sailor, out of deference to the 1962 Toei Studios feature-length cartoon Adventures of Sinbad. MGM's subsidiary Orion Pictures (whose holdings include the AIP library) later acquired the rights to the series.

== Theme music ==
The cartoon's theme song, composed by Johnny Holiday, is a variation on the children's song "Sailing, Sailing (Over the Bounding Main)" that was written in 1880 by Godfrey Marks, a pseudonym of British organist and composer James Frederick Swift (1847–1931). A later version of the theme song, composed by Ted Nichols, has a jazzier beat.

== Episodes ==
Each daily package consisted of three five-minute cartoons.

Nº	Titles	Air date
1	"Dragon Drubbers / Rock Around the Roc / Ronstermon"	September 11, 1965
2	"Captain Sly / Caveman Daze / Circus Hi-Jinks"	September 18, 1965
3	"Look Out, Lookout / Typical Bad Night / Woodchopper Stopper"	September 25, 1965
4	"Arabian Knights / Moon Madness / Sizemograph Laugh"	October 2, 1965
5	"Big Belt Bungle / Jack & the Giant / Turnabout is Foul Play"	October 9, 1965
6	"Elephant on Ice / Jekyll and Hyde / Kooky Spooky"	October 16, 1965
7	"Belted About / Big Deal Seal / The Gold Must Go Through"	October 23, 1965
8	"Belt, Buckle & Boom / Birdnapper / Tiny Tenniputians"	October 30, 1965
9	"Big Bully Blubbo Behaves / Sinbad and the Moon Rocket / The Menace of Venice"	November 6, 1965
10	"Bat Brain / Invisible Villain / Sad Gladiator"	November 13, 1965
11	"Hypnotized Guys / Sizemodoodle Poodle / The Adventures of Abou Ben Blubbo"	November 20, 1965
12	"Faces from Space / Mad Mad Movies / The Truth Hurts"	November 27, 1965
13	"Bird God / Evil Wizard"	December 4, 1965
14	"Boat Race Ace / Knight Fright / My Fair Mermaid"	December 11, 1965
15	"Sea Going Penguin / Sinbad Jr. & the Mighty Magnet / The Adventure of Frozen Fracas"	December 18, 1965
16	"Tin Can Man / Vulture Culture / Wild Wax Works"	December 25, 1965
17	"Irish Stew / Sinbad Jr. & the Counterfeiters / Sea Horse Laughs"	January 8, 1966
18	"Hot Rod Salty / Sunken Treasure / Dodo A Go Go"	January 15, 1966
19	"Gold Mine Muddle / Paleface Race / Surfboard Bully"	January 22, 1966
20	"Magic Belt Factory / Ride'em Sinbad / Sinbad Jr. & the Master Weapon"	January 29, 1966
21	"Fly By Knight / Rainmaker Fakers / Treasure of the Pyramids"	February 5, 1966
22	"Killer Diller / Railroad Ruckus / Teahouse Louse"	February 12, 1966
23	"Blubbo Goes Ape / Super Duper Duplicator / The Good Deed Steed"	February 19, 1966
24	"Blubbo's Goose Goof / Hello Dolphin / The Monster Mosquito"	February 26, 1966
25	"Cry Sheep / Sea Serpent Secret / Wacky Walrus"	March 5, 1966
26	"Cookie Caper / Daze of Old / Way Out Manhunt"	March 12, 1966
27	"Gaucho Blubbo / Claim Jumper / Space Beetles"	March 19, 1966
28	"Dinosaur Horror / Kangaroo Kaper / Siesta Time"	April 9, 1966
29	"Bull Antics / Jigsaw Phantom / Kidnapped"	April 23, 1966
30	"Killer Tiger / Monkey Business / Out West"	April 26, 1966
31	"Pirate Shark / Shake the Bottle / Sinbad Jr. & the Sun Wizard"	April 30, 1966
32	"The Fire Dragon / Sinbad Jr. and the Flying Carpet / The Mummy"	May 7, 1966
33	"The Pluto People Trap / The Tick Bird / The Wind Geni"	May 14, 1966
34	"Web of Evil / Trap Happy Trapper / Whale of a Tale"	May 21, 1966
35	"Wicked Whirlpool"	May 28, 1966

== See also ==
- List of works produced by Hanna-Barbera Productions
- List of Hanna-Barbera characters
