= 1959 in animation =

Events in 1959 in animation.

== Events ==
=== January ===
- January 10: Chuck Jones and Abe Levitow's Bugs Bunny short Baton Bunny, produced by Warner Bros. Cartoons, premieres.
- January 29: Clyde Geronimi, Eric Larson and Wolfgang Reitherman's Sleeping Beauty, produced by the Walt Disney Company, premieres.

=== February ===
- February 14: Robert McKimson's Daffy Duck and Porky Pig cartoon China Jones premieres, produced by Warner Bros. Cartoons. This short has rarely been aired on TV or re-released on home media due to its negative depictions of Eastern Asians.

=== March ===
- March 9: The first episode of Clutch Cargo is broadcast.
- March 21: Friz Freleng's Tweety and Sylvester short Trick or Tweet premieres, produced by Warner Bros. Cartoons. Also starring Sam Cat.

=== April ===
- April 6: 31st Academy Awards: Friz Freleng's Knighty Knight Bugs wins an Academy Award for Best Animated Short, the only Bugs Bunny cartoon to ever win an Oscar.
- April 18: Friz Freleng's Bugs Bunny short Apes of Wrath, produced by Warner Bros. Cartoons, premieres. Daffy Duck makes a cameo at the end. The scene where the gorilla pulls on the rope to bring Bugs over to him after threating to cut it if he steps on it became a internet meme decades later.

=== May ===
- May 9: Chuck Jones' Wile E. Coyote and Road Runner short Hot-Rod and Reel!, produced by Warner Bros. Cartoons, premieres.

=== June ===
- June 13: Robert McKimson's Bugs Bunny short Backwoods Bunny, produced by Warner Bros. Cartoons, premieres.
- June 26: Walt Disney Productions releases Donald in Mathmagic Land.
- June 27: Chuck Jones' Pepé Le Pew cartoon Really Scent premieres, produced by Warner Bros. Cartoons.

=== July ===
- July 4: Friz Freleng's Speedy Gonzales short Mexicali Shmoes, produced by Warner Bros. Cartoons, premieres. The cartoon was nominated for a Academy Award. This short marks the debut of Speedy's cousin Slowpoke Rodriguez.
- July 18: Friz Freleng's Tweety and Sylvester short Tweet and Lovely, produced by Warner Bros. Cartoons, premieres. Also starring Hector the Bulldog.

=== August ===
- August 1: Friz Freleng's Bugs Bunny short Wild and Woolly Hare, produced by Warner Bros. Cartoons, starring Bugs Bunny and Yosemite Sam.
- August 15: Robert McKimson's Sylvester short Cat's Paw premieres, produced by Warner Bros. Cartoons, also starring Sylvester Jr.
- August 29: Friz Freleng's Speedy Gonzales short Here Today, Gone Tamale, produced by Warner Bros. Cartoons, starring Speedy Gonzales & Sylvester the Cat, premieres.

=== September ===
- September 5: Robert McKimson's Bugs Bunny short Bonanza Bunny premieres, produced by Warner Bros. Cartoons.
- September 8: The first episode of Bucky and Pepito is broadcast.
- September 11: The first episode of Noggin the Nog is broadcast.
- September 25: Jiří Trnka's A Midsummer Night's Dream premieres.
- September 26: Robert McKimson's Foghorn Leghorn short A Broken Leghorn premieres, produced by Warner Bros. Cartoons. Also starring Miss Prissy.
- September 28: The first episode of Hanna-Barbera's The Quick Draw McGraw Show is broadcast which also marks the debuts of the segments Augie Doggie and Doggie Daddy and Snooper and Blabber.

=== October ===
- October 2: The first episode of Felix the Cat is broadcast. This leads to a revival in popularity for the classic theatrical cartoon character.
- October 10: Chuck Jones' Wile E. Coyote and Road Runner short Wild About Hurry, produced by Warner Bros. Cartoons, premieres.
- October 11: The first episode of Matty's Funday Funnies is broadcast.
- October 31: Abe Levitow's cartoon A Witch's Tangled Hare premieres, produced by Warner Bros. Cartoons, starring Bugs Bunny and Witch Hazel.

=== November ===
- November 7: The first episode of Cartoon Party is broadcast.
- November 19 The first episode of Rocky and Bullwinkle is broadcast.

=== December ===
- December 1: Jack Kinney's 1001 Arabian Nights premieres.
- December 5: Friz Freleng's Tweety and Sylvester short Tweet Dreams premieres, produced by Warner Bros. Cartoons.
- December 19: Robert McKimson's cartoon People Are Bunny premieres, produced by Warner Bros. Cartoons, starring Bugs Bunny and Daffy Duck.
- December 25: Akira Daikubara and Taiji Yabushita's Magic Boy is first released.
- December 28: The first episode of Ivor the Engine is broadcast.

=== Specific date unknown ===
- The first episode of Capt'n Sailorbird is broadcast.
- Yuri Merkulov's I Was a Satellite of the Sun premieres.
- Ivan Ivanov-Vano, Dmitriy Babichenko and Mikhail Botov's The Adventures of Buratino premieres.
- Qian Jiajun's Chuang Tapestry premieres.
- Gene Deitch establishes Gene Deitch Associates, Inc., funded by William L. Snyder's Rembrandt Films.

== Films released ==
- January 29 - Sleeping Beauty (United States)
- February 10 - Hyoutan suzume (Japan)
- May 5 - I Was a Satellite of the Sun (Soviet Union)
- September 25 - A Midsummer Night's Dream (Czechoslovakia)
- December 1 - 1001 Arabian Nights (United States)
- December 25 - Magic Boy (Japan)
- December 31 - The Adventures of Buratino (Soviet Union)
- Specific date unknown - Chuang Tapestry (China)

== Television series ==
- March 9 - Clutch Cargo debuts in syndication.
- September 2 - Herge's Adventures of Tintin debuts on RTB.
- September 8 - Bucky and Pepito debuts in syndication.
- September 11 - Noggin the Nog debuts on BBC.
- September 19 - Augie Doggie and Doggie Daddy and Snooper and Blabber debut in syndication.
- September 27 - The Quick Draw McGraw Show debuts in syndication.
- October 11 - Matty's Funday Funnies debuts on ABC.
- November 7 - Cartoon Party debuts on CBC.
- November 19 - Aesop and Son, Dudley Do-Right, Fractured Fairy Tales, Peabody's Improbable History, and The Rocky and Bullwinkle Show debut on ABC and NBC.
- December 28 - Ivor the Engine debuts on BBC.
- Specific date unknown - Capt'n Sailorbird and Mel-O-Toons debut in syndication.

== Births ==
=== January ===
- January 1: Anthony DeRosa, American animator (Walt Disney Animation Studios).
- January 5: Clancy Brown, American actor (voice of Lex Luthor in the DC Animated Universe, The Batman, and Superman/Batman: Public Enemies, Eugene H. Krabs in SpongeBob SquarePants, Officer Frank Horn in Lloyd in Space, Vice Principal Pangborn in All Grown Up!, Gorrath in Megas XLR, Gonta in Pom Poko, Otto in Super Robot Monkey Team Hyperforce Go!, Mr. Freeze and Bane in The Batman, Dark Dragon in American Dragon: Jake Long, Long Feng in Avatar: The Last Airbender, Mister Sinister in Wolverine and the X-Men, George Stacy and Rhino in The Spectacular Spider-Man, Destro in G.I. Joe: Renegades, Grune in ThunderCats, Silas in Transformers: Prime, Savage Opress in Star Wars: The Clone Wars, Taskmaster in Ultimate Spider-Man, Nibiru in Scooby-Doo! Mystery Incorporated, Red Hulk in Hulk and the Agents of S.M.A.S.H., Ryder Azadi in Star Wars Rebels, King Frederic in Rapunzel's Tangled Adventure, the Big Bad Wolf in The Wonderful World of Mickey Mouse episode "The Big Good Wolf").
- January 26: Herbert Siguenza, American actor, writer, visual artist, and performer (voice of Tios Oscar and Felipe in Coco).
- January 31: Anthony LaPaglia, Australian actor (voice of Lex Luthor in All-Star Superman, Boss Skua in Happy Feet and Happy Feet Two, Twilight in Legend of the Guardians: The Owls of Ga'Hoole).

=== February ===
- February 4: Pamelyn Ferdin, American voice actress (voice of Lucy Van Pelt from 1969 to 1971, Sally in The Cat in the Hat, Fern Arable in Charlotte's Web).
- February 12: Billy Frolick, American film director and screenwriter (Madagascar, Monster Island, The Big Trip, PAW Patrol: The Movie).
- February 22: Kyle MacLachlan, American actor (voice of Mr. Anderson in the Inside Out franchise, Superman in Justice League: The New Frontier, Marius in Free Jimmy, Bus Driver in the Gravity Falls episode "Weirdmageddon 3: Take Back The Falls", Del in the American Dad! episode "Paranoid Fandroid").
- February 26: Michel Gaudelette, French comic book artist and television writer (Oggy and the Cockroaches).
- February 28: Marcia Mitzman Gaven, American actress (second voice of Maude Flanders, Helen Lovejoy and Miss Hoover in The Simpsons).

=== March ===
- March 6: Tom Arnold, American actor and comedian (voice of Cupid in Hercules, Mr. Wilson in Dennis the Menace: Cruise Control, Ringo the Rat in The Race Begins, Mac Bear in The Goldilocks and 3 Bears Show, Fritz in Buster & Chauncey's Silent Night, Tony Zeal in The Replacements, Shifu in Legend of Kung Fu Rabbit, Dalliwog the Wizard in A Mouse Tale, Coati King in Jungle Shuffle, Rip Van Winkle in the Happily Ever After: Fairy Tales for Every Child episode "Rip Van Winkle", Corporate Santa in The Fairly OddParents episode "Christmas Every Day!", Norm Glidewell in the King of the Hill episode "Megalo Dale", himself in The Simpsons episode "Treehouse of Horror X" and the Space Ghost Coast to Coast episode "Joshua").
- March 7: Donna Murphy, American actress and singer (voice of Mother Gothel in the Tangled franchise).
- March 12: Luenell, American actress (voice of DMV Lady in Lucas Bros. Moving Co., Nellie Ruckus in The Boondocks episode "The Color Ruckus", Moms Mabley in the Black Dynamite episode "Sweet Bill's Badass Singalong Song or Bill Cosby Ain't Himself").
- March 18: Irene Cara, American singer, songwriter and actress (voice of Snow White in Happily Ever After, Marilyn in The Magic Voyage), (d. 2022).
- March 23: Catherine Keener, American actress (voice of Ugga in The Croods franchise, Evelyn Deavor in Incredibles 2).
- March 28: Joel McNeely, American arranger, musician, lyricist, record producer and composer (Tiny Toon Adventures, Darkwing Duck, Disneytoon Studios, American Dad!).

=== April ===
- April 3:
  - David Hyde Pierce, American actor (voice of Dr. Doppler in Treasure Planet, Buttons the Chimp in The Adventures of Hyperman, Baron von Lichtenstamp in Mighty Ducks: The Animated Series, Slim in A Bug's Life, Cecil Terwilliger in The Simpsons, Daedalus in Hercules, Puss in the Happily Ever After: Fairy Tales for Every Child episode "Puss in Boots", Addison in the Gary the Rat episode "Strange Bedfellows", Felix in The Simpsons episode "Clown in the Dumps").
  - James Gelfand, Canadian jazz pianist and composer (CINAR, Sagwa, the Chinese Siamese Cat, Pinocchio 3000, The Mysteries of Alfred Hedgehog).
- April 4: Phil Morris, American actor (voice of Dr. Sweet in Atlantis: The Lost Empire and Atlantis: Milo's Return, Doc Saturday in The Secret Saturdays, Vandal Savage in Justice League, Justice League: Doom, and Lego DC Comics Super Heroes: Justice League – Cosmic Clash, Imperiex in Legion of Super Heroes, General Zod in Young Justice, Jonah Hex in Batman: The Brave and the Bold, Colonel Hank Carter in American Dragon: Jake Long, Saint Walker in Green Lantern: The Animated Series, Earl Williams in Craig of the Creek, George in Bravest Warriors).
- April 8: Mark Baker, English animator (The Hill Farm, The Village, Jolly Roger, Peppa Pig).
- April 11: Oscar González Loyo, Mexican animator and comics artist (Plaza Sésamo), (d. 2021).
- April 15:
  - Emma Thompson, English actress (voice of Captain Amelia in Treasure Planet, Queen Elinor in Brave, Dora in Missing Link).
  - Jim P. Dilworth, American animator, designer and brother of John R. Dilworth (Courage the Cowardly Dog), (d. 2001).
  - Thomas F. Wilson, American actor (voice of Matt Bluestone in Gargoyles, Finn in Epic, Banana in Pig Goat Banana Cricket, Coach Lawrence in the Tales of Arcadia franchise, Biff Tannen in Back to the Future, Cecil Star in The Patrick Star Show, Tony Zucco in the Batman: The Animated Series episode "Robin's Reckoning").
- April 16: David Feiss, American animator and director (creator of Cow & Chicken and I Am Weasel).
- April 20: Clint Howard, American actor (voice of Hathi Jr. in The Jungle Book, Roo in The Many Adventures of Winnie the Pooh).
- April 27: Sheena Easton, Scottish singer and actress (voice of Agnes in David Copperfield, Robyn Canmore, Banshee, Molly, and Finella in Gargoyles, The Groomer in Road Rovers, Sasha La Fleur in All Dogs Go to Heaven 2, All Dogs Go to Heaven: The Series, and An All Dogs Christmas Carol, Robin Doyle in The Legend of Tarzan, Fiona Pembrooke in Scooby-Doo! and the Loch Ness Monster, Doofenshmirtz's girlfriend in the Phineas and Ferb episode "Chez Platypus", Betty in the Duckman episode "Aged Heat 2: Women in Heat", Mother Kangaroo in The Wild Thornberrys episode "Pal Joey", Trixie in The Sylvester & Tweety Mysteries episode "Yelp").
- Specific date unknown: Shuko Akune, American actress (voice of Jinx in G.I. Joe: The Movie).

=== May ===
- May 1: Ken Willard, American animator (Gumby Adventures, The Nightmare Before Christmas, Bump in the Night, Gumby: The Movie, Toy Story), (d. 1995).
- May 2:
  - Brian Tochi, American actor (voice of Alan Chan in The Amazing Chan and the Chan Clan, Bunji Tsukahara in Bionic Six, Liu Kang in Mortal Kombat: Defenders of the Realm, Ken Otsuki in The Real Adventures of Jonny Quest, Master Hama in Johnny Bravo, Shiv in Static Shock, Zhin and Zhang Lao in the Aladdin episode "Opposites Detract", Toshi in the Dexter's Laboratory episode "Last But Not Beast", Yoku in the Teenage Mutant Ninja Turtles episode "White Belt, Black Heart", Li in the Captain Planet and the Planeteers episode "In Zarm's Way").
  - Stephen Worth, American animation producer (Alvin and the Chipmunks, Spümcø, Frederator Studios) and actor (voice of Yogi Bear in Boo Boo Runs Wild).
- May 3: Chris Gifford, American writer and producer (co-creator of and voice of the Grumpy Old Troll, Big Red Chicken, and various other characters in Dora the Explorer).
- May 5:
  - Gary Dubin, American actor (voice of Toulouse in The Aristocats), (d. 2016).
  - William Reeves, Canadian animator and technical director (Pixar).
  - John Frink, American screenwriter and producer (The Simpsons, Extinct).
- May 12: Ving Rhames, American actor (voice of Cobra Bubbles in the Lilo & Stitch franchise, Thaddeus in The Star, Ryan Whittaker in Final Fantasy: The Spirits Within, Buffalo Belzer in Wendell & Wild, Garrett Krebs in The Proud Family episode "A Hero for Halloween").
- May 15: Chris Meledandri, American film producer (20th Century Animation, Illumination).
- May 19: Jim Ward, American voice actor (Count Dracula in The Super Mario Bros. Super Show! episode "Bats in the Basement/Mario and the Beanstalk", voice of Doug Dimmadone and Chet Ubetcha in The Fairly OddParents, Captain Quark in Ratchet & Clank, Commissioner Gordon in Batman: Return of the Caped Crusaders, Hugo Strange in Batman vs. Two-Face, Hun Soldier in Mulan, Diamondhead, XLR8, and Wildvine in Ben 10, Herr Kleiser in Ultimate Avengers, Professor X in Wolverine and the X-Men and The Super Hero Squad Show episode "Mysterious Mayhem at Mutant High!", Baron Strucker and Henry Peter Gyrich in The Avengers: Earth's Mightiest Heroes, Paul Revere in the Time Squad episode "Horse of Horrors", Mordru in the Legion of Super Heroes episode "Trials", Albert Einstein in The Mummy episode "The Black Forest", River Spirit in Spirited Away, provided additional voices for Shrek 2), (d. 2025).
- May 22: Harry Standjofski, Canadian actor (Security Guard in Playmobil: The Movie, voice of Brother Tuck in Young Robin Hood, V.P. Larden in Pig City, Bobby Singer in Supernatural: The Animation, Darkar in Winx Club, The Crow and the Green Fisherman in Pinocchio, provided additional voices for The Country Mouse and the City Mouse Adventures, The Tofus), (d. 2025).
- May 29: Rupert Everett, English actor (voice of Prince Charming in the Shrek franchise, Sota in Justin and the Knights of Valour, Sloan Blackburn in The Wild Thornberrys Movie).

=== June ===
- June 3: Ian Maxtone-Graham, American producer and screenwriter (The Simpsons, Beavis and Butt-Head Do the Universe).
- June 6: Paul Germain, American writer, producer, and director (co-creator of Rugrats, Recess, and Lloyd in Space).
- June 7: Mark Zaslove, American television and film writer, director, producer and novelist (Hanna-Barbera, Disney Television Animation).
- June 8: Billy Kimball, American television producer and writer (The Simpsons).
- June 11: Hugh Laurie, English actor and comedian (voice of Dr. Cockroach in the Monsters vs. Aliens franchise, Steve in Arthur Christmas, Gutsy in Valiant, Frederick Little in Stuart Little, Squire Trelawney in The Legends of Treasure Island, Johnny Town-Mouse in The World of Peter Rabbit and Friends).
- June 12: Scott Thompson, Canadian actor and comedian (voice of Mrs. Pleakley in Lilo & Stitch: The Series, Grady in The Simpsons, the title character in the Aqua Teen Hunger Force episode "Dusty Gozongas", Kid Victory in the SuperMansion episode "A Shop in the Dark", Henchman in the American Dad! episode "The Long Bomb", Thistle in Pinecone & Pony, Ash in Night of the Zoopocalypse).
- June 13: Steven DeNure, Canadian television producer (Captain Star, ReBoot, Decode Entertainment, DHX Media).
- June 18: Joe Ansolabehere, American writer and producer (co-creator of Recess and Lloyd in Space).
- June 29: Gary Rydstrom, American sound designer and film director (Pixar, Strange Magic).

=== July ===
- July 2: David Molina, American animator (The Fox and the Hound, Sullivan Bluth Studios, Tom and Jerry: The Movie), art director, director (Bionicle: Mask of Light, Bionicle 2: Legends of Metru Nui, Bionicle 3: Web of Shadows) and producer (co-creator of Nightmare Ned, co-founder of Creative Capers Entertainment).
- July 7: Billy Campbell, American actor (voice of Dave Secord in The Rocketeer, Captain Thadiun Okonda in Star Trek: Prodigy).
- July 16:
  - Bob Joles, American voice actor and musician (voice of Bill Green in Big City Greens, Bagheera in The Jungle Book 2, Frostbite in Danny Phantom, Mr. Fugu in Chowder, Mr. Nesmith in Planet Sheen, J. Jonah Jameson in Spider-Man, Hades in the Justice League Unlimited episode "The Balance", Skunderbelly in the Duck Dodgers episode "Good Duck Hunting", continued voice of Man Ray in SpongeBob SquarePants).
  - Sherri Stoner, American actress, animator, and writer (Warner Bros. Animation, Casper, The 7D, Work It Out Wombats!, Curious George, Mickey Mouse Mixed-Up Adventures, voice of Slappy Squirrel in the Animaniacs franchise and Nougat the Candy Sprite in The 7D episode "Big Candy Rock Flim-Flam", model for Ariel in The Little Mermaid and Belle in Beauty and the Beast).
- July 26: Kevin Spacey, American actor (voice of Hopper in A Bug's Life).
- July 31:
  - Karen Prell, American puppeteer and animator (Pixar).
  - Kaz, Greek-American cartoonist, illustrator, animator, storyboard artist (Corpse Bride), character designer (KaBlam!) and writer (SpongeBob SquarePants, Camp Lazlo, Phineas and Ferb).

=== August ===
- August 1: Joe Stillman, American writer, producer and director (Beavis and Butt-Head, Shrek, Sanjay and Craig).
- August 2: Victoria Jackson, American actress, comedian and singer (voice of Penelope in Garfield and Friends, Mouse in The Brave Little Toaster to the Rescue, Sarah Needlemeyer in Nightmare Ned, Communication Elf in Santa vs. the Snowman 3D, Floor Nurse in the Duckman episode "A Room with a Bellevue").
- August 3: John C. McGinley, American actor (voice of Richard Damien in Spider-Man: The New Animated Series, Man Cub Master in Lil' Pimp, Ray Palmer / Atom and Phil O'Bannon in Justice League Unlimited, The White Shadow in The Boondocks, The Whammer and Robot on TV in WordGirl, Metallo in Superman/Batman: Public Enemies, Imposter Dan in Dan Vs., Grumblegard in Dragons: Rescue Riders, One-Armed Ronnie and Ranger in the King of the Hill episode "Unfortunate Son", Doug Prepcourse in the Clone High episode "Sleep of Faith: La Rue D'Awakening", Rudolph Farnsworth/White Stripe in the Kim Possible episode "The Fearless Ferret", Executive and Bookie in the Justice League episode "Wild Cards", Dr. Diente in the American Dragon: Jake Long episode "The Legend of the Dragon Tooth", Mahmoud Ahmadinejad and Double Dare Host in the Robot Chicken episode "Chirlaxx").
- August 9: Peter Gaffney, American television producer (Jumanji) and writer (Rugrats, MTV Animation, Beethoven, Disney Television Animation, Jumanji, Roughnecks: Starship Troopers Chronicles, ¡Mucha Lucha!, Higglytown Heroes, The Simpsons, Nella the Princess Knight, Let's Go Luna!, The Bug Diaries, T.O.T.S., Thomas & Friends: All Engines Go, co-creator of Aaahh!!! Real Monsters).
- August 14:
  - Magic Johnson, American former professional basketball player (voiced himself in The Simpsons episode "Homer Defined").
  - Marcia Gay Harden, American actress (voice of Jeanne in A Cat in Paris, Keller in Tron: Uprising, Sally Stageplay in The Cuphead Show!).
- August 17: Benoît Rousseau, Canadian actor (French Canadian dub voice of Hamm in Toy Story, Abe Simpson, Kirk van Houten, and Mr Burns in The Simpsons, Krypto, Black Adam and Anubis in DC League of Super-Pets, Spider-Man Noir in Spider-Man: Into the Spider-Verse, Superman in Teen Titans Go! To the Movies, Lord MacGuffin in Brave), (d. 2026).
- August 25: Ian Falconer, American author and illustrator (creator of Olivia), (d. 2023).
- August 28: Arthur Holden, Canadian actor (voice of Mr. Ratburn in Arthur, Bump in The Busy World of Richard Scarry, Dad in What's with Andy?).

=== September ===
- September 7: Rob Pottorf, American composer (Hermie and Friends, Danger Rangers).
- September 6: Gaetano Varcasia, Italian voice actor (dub voice of Mickey Mouse from 1988 to 1995), (d. 2014).
- September 10: Jim Meskimen, American actor (voice of Ultron in Avengers Assemble, Carlos Gambe in Teenage Mutant Ninja Turtles, Goraldo in Back at the Barnyard, Ron Howard in the Family Guy episode "Griffin Winter Games", Quentin Smithee in The Adventures of Jimmy Neutron, Boy Genius episode "Lights! Camera! Danger!", Chuck in The Batman episode "Joker Express").
- September 15: Mike Reiss, American television producer (The Simpsons, The PJs, The Oblongs), writer and author (The Simpsons, Blue Sky Studios, creator of Queer Duck, co-creator of The Critic).
- September 19: Mark Gustafson, American animator (Claymation Easter, The PJs, Fantastic Mr. Fox, Guillermo del Toro's Pinocchio), (d. 2024).
- September 21:
  - Richard Reeves, Canadian-English animator.
  - Dave Coulier, American actor and comedian (voice of Animal, Bunsen, Camilla, and Statler and Waldorf in Muppet Babies, Peter Venkman in The Real Ghostbusters and Extreme Ghostbusters, Bi-Boh-Bi in Voltron: Legendary Defender, various characters in Robot Chicken, Teenage Boy in the Freakazoid! episode "Freak-a-Panel").
- September 22: David Boat, American actor (voice of the Thing in The Super Hero Squad Show, Ultimate Spider-Man, Avengers Assemble, and Hulk and the Agents of S.M.A.S.H., Thor, Uatu, Adam Warlock, Baron Mordo, and Doc Samson in The Super Hero Squad Show, Vortex in Danny Phantom).
- September 23:
  - Jason Alexander, American actor, comedian, film director, and television presenter (voice of the title character in Duckman, Hugo in The Hunchback of Notre Dame, The Hunchback of Notre Dame II, and House of Mouse, Abis Mal in the Aladdin franchise, Mr. Nibbles in Fish Hooks, Rick in The Tom and Jerry Show, Lil' Lightning in 101 Dalmatians II: Patch's London Adventure, Owl in Dora the Explorer, Mr. Bibb and the Nome King in Tom and Jerry: Back to Oz, Sy Borgman in Harley Quinn, Doctor Noum in Star Trek Prodigy, Sal in the American Dad! episode "White Rice", Bourbon Verlander in The Simpsons episode "The Caper Chase").
  - Elizabeth Peña, American actress, writer and musician (voice of Paran Dul in Justice League and Justice League Unlimited, Rosa Santos in Maya & Miguel, Mirage in The Incredibles, Maria and Gold Digger in the Minoriteam episode "Landon in Love", Store Owner in the American Dad! episode "American Dream Factory"), (d. 2014).
- September 28: Steve Hytner, American actor (voice of Ty Parsec in Buzz Lightyear of Star Command, Alectryon in the Hercules episode "Hercules and the All Nighter", Terry Delgado in The Looney Tunes Show episode "To Bowl or Not to Bowl", Representative in the Solar Opposites episode "The Cubic Lattice Crystallizer").
- September 29: Patric M. Verrone, American television producer and writer (Rugrats, The Critic, Pinky and the Brain, Futurama, The Simpsons, Class of 3000, Disenchantment).

=== October ===
- October 2: Tom Mazzocco, American animator (Ziggy's Gift, Pinocchio and the Emperor of the Night, BraveStarr: The Movie, The New Adventures of Beany and Cecil, The Little Mermaid, Looney Tunes, Hercules, Good Vibes, Brickleberry, Curious George: Royal Monkey), storyboard artist (FernGully: The Last Rainforest, The Land Before Time III: The Time of the Great Giving, Johnny Bravo, The Critic, The Proud Family, Garfield: The Movie, Danger Rangers, Leroy & Stitch, Randy Cunningham: 9th Grade Ninja, Curious George: Go West, Go Wild), sheet timer (Film Roman, Disney Television Animation, Warner Bros. Animation, Futurama, Nickelodeon Animation Studio, The Cleveland Show, Tarantula, Stretch Armstrong and the Flex Fighters, Disenchantment, Bless the Harts) and director (The Critic, What's New, Scooby-Doo?, Wallykazam!, The Powerpuff Girls).
- October 3: Greg Proops, American actor, comedian and television host (voice of the title character in the American dub of Bob the Builder, Harlequin Demon, Devil, and Sax Player in The Nightmare Before Christmas, Fode in Star Wars Episode I: The Phantom Menace, Gommy in Kaena: The Prophecy, Male Lover Bear in Brother Bear, Asmoday the Demon in Hell and Back, Banzou in Duck Duck Goose, Bernard in Stripperella, Tal Merrick in Star Wars: The Clone Wars, Cupid in Uncle Grandpa, Isosceles in The Powerpuff Girls, Jak Sivrak in Star Wars Resistance).
- October 7: Simon Cowell, English television personality and music executive (voiced himself in Scoob!, The Simpsons episode "Smart & Smarter", the Family Guy episodes "Lois Kills Stewie" and "Run, Chris, Run", and The Fairly OddParents episode "Fairy Idol").
- October 8: Nick Bakay, American actor, comedian, writer, producer and sports commentator (voice of Norbert in The Angry Beavers, Salem Saberhagen in Sabrina: The Animated Series and The Simpsons episode "Milhouse Doesn't Live Here Anymore", Warlock in the OK K.O.! Let's Be Heroes episode "OK A.U.!").
- October 10:
  - Leo Benvenuti, American writer and producer (Space Jam).
  - Mari Devon, American retired voice actress (voice of Summer Gleason in Batman: The Animated Series, Tamako Nobi in Doraemon, Togemon and Izzy's mother in Digimon Adventure, Takani Megumi in Ruroni Kenshin, Tokimi in Tenchi Muyo! Ryo-Ohki, Tammy in the Freakazoid! episode "Hero Boy").
  - Bradley Whitford, American actor (voice of Agent Sieve in Infinity Train, Mitch in Jurassic World Camp Cretaceous, King Trevor in Rapunzel's Tangled Adventure).
- October 13:
  - Doug MacLeod, Australian author and screenwriter (co-creator of Dogstar), (d. 2021).
  - Marie Osmond, American singer and actress (voice of the title character in Rose Petal Place, the Queen in Buster and Chauncey's Silent Night, Star in O' Christmas Tree, singing voice in Hugo the Hippo).
- October 15:
  - Emeril Lagasse, American chef and television personality (voice of King Darius in the Hercules episode "Hercules and the Girdle of Hippolyte", Marlon the Gator in The Princess and the Frog).
  - Sarah Ferguson, British author and television personality (Budgie the Little Helicopter, voice of the Queen in The Cat That Looked at a King).
- October 17: Norm Macdonald, Canadian comedian, writer, and actor (voice of Death in the Family Guy episode "Death Is a Bitch", Norm the Genie in The Fairly OddParents, Pigeon in Mike Tyson Mysteries, Glumshanks in Skylanders Academy, Mogens in Klaus), (d. 2021).
- October 22: Marc Shaiman, American composer and lyricist (South Park, Greg the Bunny, The Prince, voiced himself in the South Park episode "Cripple Fight").
- October 23: "Weird Al" Yankovic, American singer, musician and actor (voice of Milo Murphy in Milo Murphy's Law, Cheese Sandwich in My Little Pony: Friendship Is Magic, Darkseid in Teen Titans Go!, Dr. Screwball Jones in Wander Over Yonder, Wreck-Gar in Transformers Animated, Captain Peanut Butter in BoJack Horseman, Banana Man in Adventure Time, Dollmaker in Batman vs. Robin, Probabilitor in the Gravity Falls episode "Dungeons, Dungeons, and More Dungeons", himself in Eek! The Cat, The Simpsons, Johnny Bravo, Robot Chicken, Batman: The Brave and the Bold, Close Enough, and Scooby-Doo and Guess Who?).
- October 25: Collette Sunderman, American voice director (Hanna-Barbera, Cartoon Network Studios, Warner Bros. Animation, Mattel Television, Wow! Wow! Wubbzy!, Ultimate Spider-Man, Xiaolin Chronicles, Fresh Beat Band of Spies, Stretch Armstrong and the Flex Fighters, Avengers Assemble, Muppet Babies, T.O.T.S., Lego City Adventures).
- October 26: François Chau, Cambodian actor (voice of Quick Kick in G.I. Joe: A Real American Hero, Wahn in Raya and the Last Dragon, Monk Gyatso in Avatar Aang: The Last Airbender, Bill in the Aqua Teen Hunger Force episode "Storage Zeebies").
- October 27: Perry Kiefer, American animator (HBO Storybook Musicals, Bugs Bunny's Overtures to Disaster, Rugrats, Tiny Toon Adventures, Timon & Pumbaa), storyboard artist (Animaniacs, Rocko's Modern Life, Gargoyles, Teenage Mutant Ninja Turtles, The Tick, Pepper Ann), background artist (Animaniacs), prop designer (Gargoyles), sheet timer (Jungle Cubs) and director (101 Dalmatians: The Series), (d. 2001).
- October 29: Finola Hughes, English actress (voice of Lady Shiva in Beware the Batman, Anne of Denmark in Pocahontas II: Journey to a New World, Professor Svankmajer in Scooby-Doo! Legend of the Phantosaur, Lara Lor-Van in the Superman: The Animated Series episode "The Last Son of Krypton").

=== November ===
- November 1: Julie Mossberg, American casting director (King of the Hill, Futurama, Olive, the Other Reindeer).
- November 8: Don McManus, American actor (voice of Brachio in Dinosaucers, Caterpillar in The Care Bears Adventure in Wonderland, Carl Tennyson in the Ben 10: Alien Force episode "Grounded").
- November 10: Mackenzie Phillips, American actress (voice of Elizabeth Milder in Milo Murphy's Law, Judge and Jump Instructor in the Phineas and Ferb episode "Act Your Age").
- November 11: Glenn Gilger, American former child actor (voice of Linus van Pelt in It Was a Short Summer, Charlie Brown and A Boy Named Charlie Brown).
- November 19:
  - Ponsonby Britt, American fictional television producer (Jay Ward Productions, The Phox, the Box, and the Lox), (d. 1999).
  - Allison Janney, American actress (voice of Charlene Doofenshmirtz in Phineas and Ferb, Peach in Finding Nemo, Gladys Sharp in Over the Hedge, Mrs. Grunion in Mr. Peabody & Sherman, Madge Nelson in Minions, Margaux Needler in The Addams Family, Goldie O'Gilt in DuckTales, Henrietta van Horne in F Is for Family, Julia in The Simpsons episode "Friends and Family").
- November 22: Lenore Zann, Australian-born Canadian actress (voice of Rogue in X-Men: The Animated Series, Sizzle in Stunt Dawgs, Tigra in The Avengers: United They Stand, Roll in Mega Man NT Warrior, Aisha Clan-Clan in Outlaw Star, Reika Yamamoto in Serial Experiments Lain).
- November 24: Akio Otsuka, Japanese actor (voice of Shigaraki / All For One in My Hero Academia, Anavel Gato in Gundam, Batou in Ghost in the Shell, Kyoraku Shunsui in Bleach, Japanese dub voice of Bobby in Animaniacs, Spider-Man Noir in Spider-Man: Into the Spider-Verse, Dick Dastardly in Wacky Races, and Iron Will in My Little Pony: Friendship Is Magic).
- November 28: Judd Nelson, American actor (voice of Eon and Ben 10,000 in Ben 10: Omniverse, Hot Rod and Rodimus Prime in the Transformers franchise).

=== December ===
- December 9: Steve Mackall, Canadian-American actor (voice of Marsupilami in Raw Toonage and Marsupilami, Nosedive Flashblade in Mighty Ducks: The Animated Series, Owliver in Annabelle's Wish, Dr. Valentine in The Secret of NIMH 2: Timmy to the Rescue, Hyperman in The Adventures of Hyperman).
- December 11: William Joyce, American writer, producer, director, illustrator and filmmaker (Rolie Polie Olie, Meet the Robinsons, Rise of the Guardians, Robots, Epic, The Fantastic Flying Books of Mr. Morris Lessmore, Pixar).
- December 16: Alison La Placa, American actress (voice of the title character in the Batman: The Animated Series episode "Baby-Doll", Marion in the Duckman episode "With Friends Like These").
- December 17: Timothy J. Borquez, American editor (Film Roman, The Ren & Stimpy Show, The Little Mermaid), music editor (Ruby-Spears Enterprises, Bionic Six, Film Roman, What a Cartoon!, Bionicle, The SpongeBob SquarePants Movie), sound editor (Dino-Riders, Film Roman, Disney Television Animation, Nickelodeon Animation Studio, Capitol Critters, Hyperion Pictures, Balto II: Wolf Quest, Lenny & Sid, Gary the Rat, Bionicle, Warner Bros. Animation, Cartoon Network Studios, Robot Chicken, SuperMansion) and re-recording mixer (Film Roman, Disney Television Animation, Nickelodeon Animation Studio, Hyperion Pictures, Hanna-Barbera, Voltron: The Third Dimension, Cartoon Network Studios, Lenny & Sid, Gary the Rat, Bionicle, Warner Bros. Animation, Robot Chicken, SuperMansion).
- December 20: Ivan Tankushev, Bulgarian animator (CINAR), storyboard artist (Arthur) and overseas supervisor (Family Guy).
- December 29: Paula Poundstone, American comedian, author, actor, and commentator (voice of Forgetter Paula in the Inside Out franchise, Paulette in Summer Camp Island, Judge Stone in Science Court, Queen Antagonista in The Fungies! episode "The Twins Bug Seth", first voice of Paula Small in Home Movies).
- December 30: Tracey Ullman, English-American actress, comedian, singer, writer, producer and director (voice of Moonbeam and Thunderella in Happily Ever After, the title character in season 1 of The Little Lulu Show, Nell Van Dort and Hildegarde in Corpse Bride, Ms. Birdwell in Kronk's New Groove, Miggery Sow in The Tale of Despereaux, Grecklin in Onward, Emily Winthrop and Sylvia Winfield in The Simpsons episode "Bart's Dog Gets an "F"", Marla in the Sofia the First episode "Mom's the Word").
- December 31:
  - Ronnie del Carmen, Filipino animator (Widget the World Watcher, Where's Wally?, Batman: The Animated Series), writer, director (Freakazoid!, Inside Out), story artist (DreamWorks Animation), story supervisor and production designer (Pixar).
  - Val Kilmer, American actor (voice of Moses and God in The Prince of Egypt, Bogardus in Delgo, Bravo in Planes), (d. 2025).

=== Specific date unknown ===
- Tilo Schmitz, German actor (German dub voice of John Stewart in Justice League and Justice League Unlimited, Sheriff Stone in Scooby-Doo! Mystery Incorporated, Almighty Tallest Purple in Invader Zim, Dr. Sweet in Atlantis: The Lost Empire, Kilowog in Green Lantern: The Animated Series, Ken in Bee Movie).
- Richard Starzak, English animator, screenwriter, and film director (Aardman Animations).
- Bill Morrison, American comic book artist, writer, editor and art director (Futurama, Disenchantment).
- Keith Chapman, English television writer and producer (creator of Bob the Builder and PAW Patrol).
- Alison Sealy-Smith, Barbadian-born Canadian actress (voice of Snake in Miss Spider's Sunny Patch Friends, Gamora in Silver Surfer, second voice of Storm in X-Men: The Animated Series).
- Calpurnio, Spanish poster artist, animator, illustrator, veejay and comics artist (worked on an animated TV series of his signature comic series Cuttlas), (d. 2022).

== Deaths ==
=== February ===
- February 16: John Foster, American animator and film director (International Film Service, Van Beuren Studios, Terrytoons), dies at age 72.

=== March ===
- March 2: Eric Blore, English actor and comedian (voice of Mr. Toad in The Adventures of Ichabod and Mr. Toad), dies at age 71.

=== May ===
- January 4: George Albert Smith, English filmmaker, inventor, magic lantern lecturer, stage hypnotist, and claimed psychic, (In 1894, Smith started staging magic lantern shows of a series of "dissolving views". Smith's skilful manipulation of the lantern, cutting between lenses (from slide to slide) to show changes in time, perspective and location necessary for storytelling, allowed him to develop many of the skills he would later put to use as a pioneering filmmaker. He is credited with developing the grammar of film editing. He developed special effects by using his own patented process of double-exposure. Smith developed the Lee-Turner Process into the first successful color film process, Kinemacolor), dies at age 95.

=== August ===
- August 28: Heinz Goedecke, German actor (narrator in Die Schlacht um Miggershausen), dies at age 56.

=== September ===
- September 30: Taylor Holmes, American actor (voice of King Stefan in Sleeping Beauty), dies at age 81.

=== November ===
- November 16: Florencio Molina Campos, Argentine illustrator and painter (Walt Disney Animation Studios), dies at age 68.
- November 18: Arthur Q. Bryan, American comedian and actor (voice of Elmer Fudd in Looney Tunes), dies at age 60.

== See also ==
- List of anime by release date (1946–1959)

== Sources ==
- Solomon, Charles (2014). Once Upon a Dream: From Perrault's Sleeping Beauty to Disney's Maleficent. Disney Editions. ISBN 978-1-4231-9902-1.
