= List of animated television series of the 1940s and 1950s =

This is a list of animated television series first aired prior to 1960.

== 1949–52 ==
Title	Episodes	Country	Year	Notes	Technique
Tele-Comics/NBC Comics	165	United States	1949–51	Sequential drawings, not true animation.	Sequential drawings
Jim and Judy in Teleland	52	United States	1949		Traditional
Crusader Rabbit	455	United States	1950–59		Traditional

== 1953–58 ==
Title	Episodes	Country	Year	Notes	Technique
Winky Dink and You	65	United States	1953–57		Traditional
Winky Dink and You	65	United States	1969–73		Traditional
The Adventures of Paddy the Pelican	6	United States	1954		Traditional
Disney anthology television series (various titles)	58	United States	1954–present	Mostly an anthology TV series, originally hosted by Walt Disney, with some episodes dedicated to animation. All of these were compilation episodes, with older Disney cartoons combined with new animation. Most notable are those featuring Ludwig Von Drake as host.	Traditional, Live Action
Mighty Mouse Playhouse	75	United States	1955–67	Compilation show	Traditional
The Mickey Mouse Club	620	United States	1955–96	Mostly live-action with animation inserts, possible real year since BCDB is saying that these animated segments were mostly from 1955.	Traditional, Live Action
A Rubovian Legend	35	United Kingdom	1955	Stop-motion	Stop Motion
Gumby	130	United States	1956–68		Stop Motion
The Gerald McBoing-Boing Show	26	United States	1956–57	Compilation show	Traditional
Tom Terrific	26	United States	1957–59		Traditional
Adventures of Pow Wow	45	United States	1957–58		Traditional
The Ruff and Reddy Show	156	United States	1957–60	Very first ever Hanna-Barbera Studios' animated television cartoon show series.	Traditional
The Woody Woodpecker Show	113	United States	1957–66	Compilation show	Traditional
The Woody Woodpecker Show	113	United States	1970–97	Compilation show	Traditional
Colonel Bleep	104	United States	1957–60	First TV cartoon to be in colour; historic cartoon history landmark	Sequential drawings
Herge's Adventures of Tintin	104	Belgium	1957–64		Traditional
Captain Pugwash	58	United Kingdom	1957–98		Cut-Out
The Adventures of Spunky and Tadpole	19	United States	1958–61		Traditional
Bozo: The World's Most Famous Clown	157	United States	1958–62		Traditional
The Huckleberry Hound Show	68	United States	1958–62		Traditional
Yogi Bear	35	United States	1958–60	Huckleberry Hound Show segment	Traditional
Nalle ritar och berättar	10	Sweden	1958–59		Traditional
Pixie and Dixie and Mr. Jinks	57	United States	1958–62	Huckleberry Hound Show segment	Traditional
The Space Explorers	26	United States	1958		Stop Motion

== 1959 ==
Title	Episodes	Country	Year	Notes	Technique
Clutch Cargo	52	United States	1959		Syncro-Vox
The Adventures of Rocky and Bullwinkle and Friends	163	United States	1959–64		Traditional
Capt'n Sailorbird	190	United States	1959–60	Compilation show	Traditional
The Quick Draw McGraw Show	45	United States	1959–62		Traditional
Matty's Funday Funnies		United States	1959–62	Compilation show	Traditional
New Adventures of the Space Explorers		United States	1959		Stop Motion
Snooper and Blabber	45	United States	1959	Quick Draw McGraw segment	Traditional
Fractured Fairy Tales	91	United States	1959	Rocky and Bullwinkle Show segment	Traditional
Aesop and Son	39	United States	1959	Rocky and Bullwinkle Show segment	Traditional
Peabody's Improbable History	91	United States	1959	Rocky and Bullwinkle Show segment	Traditional
Dudley Do-Right	39	United States	1959	Rocky and Bullwinkle Show segment	Traditional
Augie Doggie and Doggie Daddy	45	United States	1959–61	Quick Draw McGraw segment	Traditional
Felix the Cat	126	United States	1959–61		Traditional
Bucky and Pepito	36	United States	1959		Traditional
Mel-O-Toons	26	United States	1959–60		Traditional
Noggin the Nog	42	United Kingdom	1959–65		Traditional
Ivor the Engine	40	United Kingdom	1959		Traditional
Cartoon Party		Canada	1959–62	Compilation show	Traditional
