= List of T.O.T.S. episodes =

T.O.T.S., also known as Tiny Ones Transport Service, is an American animated children's television series created by Travis Braun. The series debuted on Disney Junior on June 13, 2019.

Like other Disney Junior shows from the time, the episode titles are spoken, but do not appear in text.

== Series overview ==
Season	Episodes	Originally released	
Season	Episodes	First released	Last released
1	25	June 2019	July 10, 2020
2	25	August 7, 2020	June 18, 2021
3	25	July 9, 2021	June 10, 2022

== Episodes ==
=== Season 1 (2019–2020) ===
No. overall	No. in season	Title	Written by	Storyboard directed by	Original release date	Prod. code	US viewers (millions)
1a	1a	"You've Gotta Be Kitten Me"	Travis Braun	Michael J. Smith	June 14, 2019 (USA) June 22, 2019 (Canada)	101	0.64
On their first day at T.O.T.S., Pip and Freddy try to deliver a kitten named Kiki, but she thinks that they are her parents, and wants to stay with them.
1b	1b	"Whale, Hello There"	Travis Braun	Abigail Nesbitt	June 14, 2019 (USA) June 22, 2019 (Canada)	101	0.64
The delivery birds struggle to deliver a whale named Wyatt who is extremely big and heavy.
2a	2a	"Panda Excess"	S : Travis Braun; S/T : Amy Keating Rogers	Michael J. Smith	June 14, 2019 (USA) June 23, 2019 (Canada)	102	0.66
Pip and Freddy try to deliver a panda named Precious. However, the baby hypnotizes Freddy with its cuteness.
2b	2b	"A Stinky Situation"	Guy Toubes	Abigail Nesbitt	June 14, 2019 (USA) June 23, 2019 (Canada)	102	0.66
A skunk named Scooter won't be delivered until later in the day. Pip and Freddy have to play with him, but they must figure how to get around his off-putting smell.
3a	3a	"Cheetah Chase"	Travis Braun	Michael J. Smith	June 21, 2019 (USA) July 1, 2019 (Canada)	103	0.46
A cheetah named Chase doesn't want to nap, but play tag instead. Pip and Freddy need to catch Chase and get him to sleep so they can deliver him.
3b	3b	"Training Daze"	Rick Suvalle	Abigail Nesbitt	June 21, 2019 (USA) July 1, 2019 (Canada)	103	0.46
Pip and Freddy find themselves leading three young storks on a field trip to teach them how to deliver a baby.
4a	4a	"Nursery Schooling"	S : Guy Toubes; T : Becky Friedman	Michael J. Smith	June 28, 2019 (USA) July 7, 2019 (Canada)	104	0.49
K.C. catches a cold, and takes a day off. Pip and Freddy temporarily assume the role in tending the infants.
4b	4b	"Bunny Bunanza"	Amy Keating Rogers	Abigail Nesbitt	June 28, 2019 (USA) July 7, 2019 (Canada)	104	0.49
Pip and Freddy get into a mid-air collision with JP, another delivery bird, causing all their bunnies named Blinky, Bouncy, Blondy, Burpy, Bushy, and Bobtail to spill out. They then must sort out which bunny goes to which family.
5a	5a	"The Purrfect Little Helper"	Travis Braun	Michael J. Smith	July 5, 2019 (USA) July 14, 2019 (Canada)	105	0.71
Pip and Freddy try to make a room at T.O.T.S. for Captain Beakman who is expecting a child. But a kitten named Mia, which they'll deliver later, attempts to add different things to the room.
5b	5b	"The Colorful Chameleon"	Rick Suvalle	Abigail Nesbitt	July 5, 2019 (USA) July 14, 2019 (Canada)	105	0.71
Pip and Freddy attempt to deliver a chameleon named Cam. Confusion sets in when the reptilian comes out of its crate, and begins emulating the colors of anyone he comes across.
6a	6a	"Stripe Out"	Rick Suvalle	Abigail Nesbitt	July 12, 2019 (USA) July 21, 2019 (Canada)	106	0.57
Pip and Freddy try to deliver Tara, an animal they are unfamiliar with. Because Pip's computer tablet runs out of battery, they couldn't identify Tara's species, which makes it difficult to find her parents.
6b	6b	"A Splashy Delivery"	Amy Keating Rogers	Michael J. Smith	July 12, 2019 (USA) July 21, 2019 (Canada)	106	0.57
Pip and Freddy attempt to deliver an octopus named Octavia. Trouble starts when the crate carrying Octavia leaks out water.
7a	7a	"Night Flight"	S : Amy Keating Rogers; S/T : Becky Friedman	Abigail Nesbitt	July 19, 2019 (USA) July 28, 2019 (Canada)	107	0.45
Pip and Freddy have to deliver a bat named Benny at night as bats are uncomfortable with light. But there is one problem: Freddy is scared of darkness.
7b	7b	"Slippery When Wet"	Brandon Violette	Michael J. Smith	July 19, 2019 (USA) July 28, 2019 (Canada)	107	0.45
Pip does not like getting wet because it makes him very slippery. But to his dismay, he needs to make a delivery on a rainy day.
8a	8a	"Hiccup Hazard"	Brandon Violette	Abigail Nesbitt	July 26, 2019 (USA) August 4, 2019 (Canada)	108	N/A
Pip develops a case of the hiccups, which hinders his ability to fly.
8b	8b	"The Great Robot Race"	Rick Suvalle	Michael J. Smith	July 26, 2019 (USA) August 4, 2019 (Canada)	108	N/A
A peacock entrepreneur named Professor Peacock showcases a robot stork he claims could deliver babies faster than any of the fliers. To prove him wrong, Pip and Freddy compete against the robot in a race involving twin bear cubs named Betty and Bobby.
9a	9a	"Back to Cool"	Rick Suvalle	Michael J. Smith	August 1, 2019 (USA) August 11, 2019 (Canada)	109	0.59
After delivering a penguin named Penn, the penguin's parents invite Pip and Freddy to have some fun in the snowy grounds. Can Freddy withstand the freezing climate?
9b	9b	"Baby Breakdown"	Becky Friedman	Abigail Nesbitt	August 1, 2019 (USA) August 11, 2019 (Canada)	109	0.59
Pip and Freddy accidentally damage part of the machine which prepares the infants for delivery. The damage worsens when they try to fix it on their own.
10a	10a	"Lost Lovey"	Jennifer Hamburg	Abigail Nesbitt	August 9, 2019 (USA) August 18, 2019 (Canada)	110	0.46
Pip and Freddy have to find Mia's lovey after it gets lost.
10b	10b	"Diggity Dog"	S : Rick Suvalle; T : Kent Redeker	Michael J. Smith	August 9, 2019 (USA) August 18, 2019 (Canada)	110	0.46
A puppy named Pablo buries Pip's Flypad, putting the delivery in danger.
11a	11a	"Temple of the Tiger"	Guy Toubes	Abigail Nesbitt	August 16, 2019 (USA) August 25, 2019 (Canada)	111	N/A
Pip and Freddy are assigned to deliver a tiger named Tiberius, who is a royal prince. Things get rocky when they reach the tiger's palace which is filled with hazards.
11b	11b	"The Gift-Mazing Birthday"	Rick Suvalle	Michael J. Smith	August 16, 2019 (USA) August 25, 2019 (Canada)	111	N/A
A pig named Pearl becomes Pip and Freddy's infant for delivery. Because her departure day is also her birthday, Freddy wants to elate her with a present.
12a	12a	"Like Cats and Dogs Like Cats and Dogs (rok)"	S : Amy Keating Rogers; T : Karissa Valencia	Michael J. Smith	August 23, 2019 (USA) September 1, 2019 (Canada) (Emoji Google Android 10.0)	113	0.59
When a puppy and kitten named Kenny and Penny are fighting, Pip and Freddy teaches the puppy and kitten to share.
12b	12b	"The Bouncy Bouncy Baby"	S : Amy Keating Rogers; S/T : Becky Friedman	Abigail Nesbitt	August 23, 2019 (USA) September 1, 2019 (Canada) (EMOJI GOOGLE ANDROID 10.0)	113	0.59
Pip gets stuck in a crate where Kiera the Kangaroo is getting delivered.
13a	13a	"For Lion Out Loud"	Rick Suvalle	Abigail Nesbitt	September 13, 2019 (USA) September 22, 2019 (Canada)	115	N/A
Pip and Freddy teach a lion named Linus how to tell the difference between loud and quiet.
13b	13b	"Porcupine Panic"	Brandon Violette	Michael J. Smith	September 13, 2019 (USA) September 22, 2019 (Canada)	115	N/A
Pip, Freddy, and KC help a porcupine named Petey face his fear of tubes.
14a	14a	"The Fearful Flier"	Becky Friedman	Abigail Nesbitt	September 27, 2019 (USA) October 6, 2019 (Canada)	116	N/A
Bodhi faces his fear to earn his final stamp towards becoming a Super Flier.
14b	14b	"Lend Me Your Paw"	S : Travis Braun; S/T : Jennifer Hamburg	Michael J. Smith	September 27, 2019 (USA) October 6, 2019 (Canada)	116	N/A
After Mia gets a thorn stuck in her paw, she worries it will hurt when K.C. tries to take it out.
15a	15a	"Koala Kuisine"	S : Travis Braun; S/T : Brandon Violette	Michael J. Smith	October 18, 2019 (USA) October 20, 2019 (Canada)	117	N/A
When T.O.T.S. is out of stock of a hippo's favorite cereal, K.C. struggles to find an alternative for Henry the hippo to eat.
15b	15b	"Monkeying Around and Around"	Travis Braun and Kent Redeker	Abigail Nesbitt	October 18, 2019 (USA) October 20, 2019 (Canada)	117	N/A
The young monkey, Marty, is interested in Pip and Freddy's job, and starts delivering things to anyone he comes across, even if it means moving away from the two birds who are assigned to deliver him.
16a	16a	"Bringing Back Baby"	Becky Friedman	Abigail Nesbitt	November 8, 2019 (USA) November 10, 2019 (Canada)	118	0.38
Pip and Freddy show Peggy, the Polar Bear, the benefits of having a baby brother named Paul when she tries to return him to T.O.T.S.
16b	16b	"A Penguin in the Desert"	Ron Holsey	Michael J. Smith	November 8, 2019 (USA) November 10, 2019 (Canada)	118	0.38
Pip and Freddy brave the desert heat to deliver a camel named Camille.
17a	17a	"Out Foxed"	Brandon Violette	Abigail Nesbitt	November 22, 2019 (USA) November 24, 2019 (Canada)	119	0.40
Freddy’s status as the best hide-and-seeker is challenged after he and Pip lose a baby fox named Finny.
17b	17b	"Elephant in the Room"	Rick Suvalle	Michael J. Smith	November 22, 2019 (USA) November 24, 2019 (Canada)	119	0.40
Pip and Freddy help K.C. earn her first Golden Feather on Cleaning Day.
18a	18a	"Santa Baby"	Rick Suvalle	Abigail Nesbitt	December 6, 2019 (USA) December 15, 2019 (Canada) January 1, 2020 (Mexico) (New years Day)	114	N/A
Pip and Freddy teach Renny, a magical baby reindeer the joy of Christmas giving.
18b	18b	"Shear Madness"	S : Amy Keating Rogers; T : Guy Toubes	Michael J. Smith	December 6, 2019 (USA) December 15, 2019 (Canada) January 1, 2020 (Mexico) (New years day)	114	N/A
When Pip and Freddy accidentally shave Sheera’s wool, they struggle to fix it before delivering her. Note: This is the last episode to air in the 2010s.
19a	19a	"Rock-a-Bye Birdie"	Brandon Violette	Michael J. Smith	January 3, 2020 (USA) January 12, 2020 (Canada)	121	0.67
When a mockingbird named Mimi starts singing K.C.'s lullaby, she puts everyone at T.O.T.S. to sleep, just as they're about to celebrate their millionth delivery. Note: This is the first episode to air in the 2020s.
19b	19b	"The Fly-Along"	Rick Suvalle	Abigail Nesbitt	January 3, 2020 (USA) January 12, 2020 (Canada)	121	0.67
Pip and Freddy try to impress their boss, Captain Beakman, on a ride-a-long delivery, which involves a baby donkey named Diane.
20a	20a	"The Valentine Spirit"	S : Amy Keating Rogers; S/T : Becky Friedman	Abigail Nesbitt	January 24, 2020 (USA) February 1, 2020 (Canada)	112	0.35
Freddy and Pip rush to deliver Valentines to the babies they’ve delivered to make it back in time for the Valentine’s Day Party.
20b	20b	"Shell Games"	Adam Beechen	Michael J. Smith	January 24, 2020 (USA) February 1, 2020 (Canada)	112	0.35
Freddy, Pip and K.C. try to get a shy turtle named Tallulah out of her shell.
21a	21a	"The Fastest Flier"	Niki Lytton	Abigail Nesbitt	February 21, 2020 (USA) March 1, 2020 (Canada) (Emoji Google Android 10.0 March 2020 Updat)	123	0.32
Ava learns that there's more to being a proper deliverer than just being fast when delivering a baby frog named Flora.
21b	21b	"Best Friends Wherever (Mia and her best friends)"	Becky Friedman	Michael J. Smith	February 21, 2020 (USA) March 1, 2020 (Canada) (EMOJI GOOGLE ANDROID 10.0 MARCH 2020 UPDATE)	123	0.32
Mia refuses to part from Chloe, a cow calf whom she's become close friends with.
22a	22a	"The Ultimate Easter Egg Hunt"	Brandon Violette	Abigail Nesbitt	March 13, 2020 (USA) March 22, 2020 (Canada)	122	0.37
Pip and Freddy’s next delivery gets mixed up with the other eggs for the Annual Easter Egg Hunt.
22b	22b	"A Chewy Challenge"	Becky Friedman	Michael J. Smith	March 13, 2020 (USA) March 22, 2020 (Canada)	122	0.37
Pip and Freddy must deliver a baby beaver named Bernice, who is chewing and gnawing on everything in sight.
23a	23a	"Night at the Nursery"	Brandon Violette	Michael J. Smith	March 20, 2020 (USA) March 29, 2020 (Canada)	124	0.65
The Junior Fliers help Oki, an otter pup, who has trouble sleeping.
23b	23b	"Seas the Day"	Rick Suvalle	Abigail Nesbitt	March 20, 2020 (USA) March 29, 2020 (Canada)	124	0.65
Pip and Freddy make their first underwater delivery by delivering Donny, a baby dolphin. But Freddy, however, isn't a good swimmer.
24a	24a	"Daddy Delivery"	Rick Suvalle	Abigail Nesbitt	June 19, 2020 (USA) July 5, 2020 (Canada)	120	0.41
It's Father's Day at T.O.T.S., and Pip and Freddy are tasked with delivering a baby hedgehog named Hedy to its father.
24b	24b	"Junior Flier JP"	Becky Friedman	Michael J. Smith	June 19, 2020 (USA) July 5, 2020 (Canada)	120	0.41
When JP gets demoted to Junior Flier after failing the Baby Skills test, Pip and Freddy help him regain the rank of Super-Duper Flier, by helping him take care of a baby gorilla named Gus. JP is finally able to make the baby laugh.
25a	25a	"Bringing This Family Home"	Travis Braun	Abigail Nesbitt	July 10, 2020 (USA) July 12, 2020 (Canada)	125	0.36
Pip and Freddy help K.C get home to her family to meet her new baby cousin named Kyla.
25b	25b	"Flight of the Penguin"	Becky Friedman	Michael J. Smith	July 10, 2020 (USA) July 12, 2020 (Canada)	125	0.36
Pip and Freddy attempt to deliver two babies at once.

=== Season 2 (2020–2021) ===
No. overall	No. in season	Title	Written by	Storyboard directed by	Original release date	Prod. code	US viewers (millions)
26a	1a	"Puppy Problems"	Travis Braun	Abigail Nesbitt	August 7, 2020 (USA) September 6, 2020 (Canada)	201A	0.36
Pip, Freddy, and KC prepare a dachshund puppy named Lucky for delivery, but he ends up being a lot of trouble.
26b	1b	"The Mighty Little Dragon"	Rick Suvalle	Michael J. Smith	August 7, 2020 (USA) September 6, 2020 (Canada)	201B	0.36
Pip and Freddy pretend to be knights when delivering a baby Komodo dragon named Dana.
46a	21a	"Mommy's Special Day"	Becky Friedman	Abigail Nesbitt	April 16, 2021 (USA) 2021 (Canada)	202A	N/A
Pip and Freddy help Mia make Captain Beakman the most biggest and most special Mother's Day present ever.
46b	21b	"All Aboard Babies"	Brandon Violette	Michael J. Smith	April 16, 2021 (USA) 2021 (Canada)	202B	0.42
When Lucky takes the baby train for a joyride, the Flyers must stop it.
27a	2a	"Mid-Air Care"	David Shayne	Abigail Nesbitt	August 14, 2020 (USA) September 20, 2020 (Canada)	TBA	0.44
KC joins Pip and Freddy for their first ever mid-air preparation.
27b	2b	"The Itsy Bitsy Baby"	Becky Friedman	Michael J. Smith	August 14, 2020 (USA) September 20, 2020 (Canada)	206	0.44
Pip and Freddy witness a magic show while delivering a caterpillar named Calvin.
28a	3a	"The Big Little Baby"	Rick Suvalle	Abigail Nesbitt	August 21, 2020 (USA) September 27, 2020 (Canada)	TBA	0.52
Mr. Woodbird's latest invention, the Big-O-Nator 9000, accidentally hits a baby gorilla named Gabby, turning her into a giant.
28b	3b	"The Super Secret Mission"	Niki Lytton	Michael J. Smith	August 21, 2020 (USA) September 27, 2020 (Canada)	TBA	0.52
With Mia by their side, Pip and Freddy attempt to uncover what Captain Beakman's secret mission is.
29a	4a	"Junior Junior Fliers"	Brandon Violette	Abigail Nesbitt	August 28, 2020 (USA) October 4, 2020 (Canada)	TBA	0.37
Kid storks Jed, Red, and Zed take on Pip and Freddy's latest delivery, which is a baby moose named Matilda.
29b	4b	"Good Vibrations"	Jeffrey King	Michael J. Smith	August 28, 2020 (USA) October 4, 2020 (Canada)	TBA	0.37
Pip and Freddy become helicopter parents towards their latest delivery, a baby mole named Molly. Song: "Molly Knows Best"
30a	5a	"Mission to the Moon"	Becky Friedman	Abigail Nesbitt	September 11, 2020 (USA) November 1, 2020 (Canada)	203	0.26
Pip and Freddy deliver Willa, a female baby wolf, who dreams of seeing the moon.
30b	5b	"Say Cheese"	Brandon Violette	Michael J. Smith	September 11, 2020 (USA) November 1, 2020 (Canada)	203	0.26
It's Picture Day at T.O.T.S., and Pip and Freddy attempt to get the ever-mischievous puppy, Lucky, ready for the event.
31a	6a	"The Ring Bear"	Niki Lytton	Abigail Nesbitt	September 25, 2020 (USA) November 8, 2020 (Canada)	TBA	0.26
Mia requires help when she misplaces her aunt Cora's wedding ring on her wedding day.
31b	6b	"Bull of Energy"	Rick Suvalle	Michael J. Smith	September 25, 2020 (USA) November 8, 2020 (Canada)	208	0.26
Pip and Freddy watch over an energetic baby bull named Bucky, and try to keep him out of trouble until his mom returns home.
32a	7a	"A Spooky Delivery"	Jennifer Hamburg	Michael J. Smith	October 1, 2020 (USA) October 25, 2020 (Canada)	205a	0.23
Pip and Freddy try to help JP get into the Halloween spirit.
32b	7b	"Under One Roof"	Brandon Violette	Abigail Nesbitt	October 1, 2020 (USA) October 25, 2020 (Canada)	TBA	0.23
After a baby giraffe named Gio is found to be too big for his forever home, Pip and Freddy try to make his whole family a new one they can all fit in.
33a	8a	"Far Far from Home (Far far far away)"	Rick Suvalle	Abigail Nesbitt	November 6, 2020 (USA) November 15, 2020 (Canada)	TBA	0.23
On the duo's first overnight delivery, Freddy worries they won't finish in time for him to sleep, and he struggles to stay awake.
33b	8b	"Toy Trouble"	Becky Friedman	Michael J. Smith	November 6, 2020 (USA) November 15, 2020 (Canada)	TBA	0.23
When Mia has trouble giving away her old toys, Pip and Freddy try to teach her the joys of donating Freddy mouth zoom 3 and box zoom out.
34a	9a	"TOTSgiving"	Brandon Violette	Michael J. Smith	November 13, 2020 (USA) November 22, 2020 (Canada)	TBA	0.32
After Lucky nearly ruins TOTSgiving, Pip, Freddy, and KC set out to save the holiday.
34b	9b	"Woodbird's Wish"	Niki Lytton	Abigail Nesbitt	November 13, 2020 (USA) November 22, 2020 (Canada)	TBA	0.32
Mr. Woodbird always dreamed of making a baby delivery, so Pip and Freddy are here to help.
35a	10a	"The Magical Baby"	Chelsea Beyl	Michael J. Smith	November 20, 2020 (USA) November 29, 2020 (Canada)	TBA	0.25
Freddy believes baby narwhal Nathan is magical.
35b	10b	"Loveys on the Loose"	Brandon Violette	Abigail Nesbitt	November 20, 2020 (USA) November 29, 2020 (Canada)	TBA	0.25
Professor Peacock returns with a new invention, called Lovey-Bots, which unintentionally wreak havoc and threaten the deliveries of Marnie, Zigi, and Ling, as well as Mr. Woodbird's job.
36a	11a	"Hug-a-Pip"	Becky Friedman	Michael J. Smith	December 4, 2020 (USA) December 13, 2020 (Canada) January 1, 2021 (Mexico) (New years day)	TBA	0.27
Lucy the Snow Leopard becomes attached to Pip after losing her lovey.
36b	11b	"Out of Control Tower, Out of Control Tower (rok)"	Rick Suvalle	Abigail Nesbitt	December 4, 2020 (USA) December 13, 2020 (Canada) January 1, 2021 (Mexico) (New years day)	TBA	0.27
Paulie’s glasses break, so Pip, Freddy, and Mia take over his Control Tower duties Freddy mouth zoom in 2.
37b	12b	"The Smiley-est Shark"	Jennifer Hamburg	Abigail Nesbitt	January 8, 2021 (USA) February 7, 2021 (Canada)	TBA	0.24
Pip and Freddy help a baby shark named Stanley make friends, despite his smile scaring the other babies.
37a	12a	"The Super Duper Brother"	Rick Suvalle	Michael J. Smith	January 8, 2021 (USA) February 7, 2021 (Canada)	TBA	0.24
JP's mail carrying brother PJ visits the facility, and he tries to prove he's better than him at something, following a delivery.
38a	13a	"Surfin' Birds"	Brandon Violette	Michael J. Smith	January 22, 2021 (USA) February 14, 2021 (Canada)	TBA	0.22
Pip and Freddy participate in a surfing competition, while delivering Sandy, the baby sea turtle.
38b	13b	"Grandpa’s Great Adventure"	Becky Friedman	Abigail Nesbitt	January 22, 2021 (USA) February 14, 2021 (Canada)	TBA	0.22
Pip and Freddy team up with legendary flier, Grandpa Hank Featherbeak, while delivering a baby stork named Spencer.
39a	14a	"Sled Pup"	Becky Friedman	Abigail Nesbitt	February 12, 2021 (USA) February 21, 2021 (Canada)	TBA	N/A
With Freddy unable to fly, baby husky Hazel, pulls him and Pip sled-style to her delivery, but she keeps getting distracted, helping other babies.
39b	14b	"Baby Boogie"	Niki Lytton	Michael J. Smith & Josh Greer	February 12, 2021 (USA) February 21, 2021 (Canada)	TBA	N/A
On K.C.'s birthday, the T.O.T.S. crew host a talent show starring babies, including a platypus named Penelope, who has a special way of dancing.
40a	15a	"Listen to Your Llama"	Rick Suvalle	Abigail Nesbitt	February 19, 2021 (USA) February 28, 2021 (Canada)	TBA	N/A
Pip and Freddy learn that there are no shortcuts to understanding a baby's true needs, as they struggle to get a llama named Lulu ready.
40b	15b	"Swimming With Seals"	Becky Friedman	Michael J. Smith	February 19, 2021 (USA) February 28, 2021 (Canada)	TBA	N/A
Pip and Freddy show a baby seal named Sebastian how to love the water, due to him being of afraid of it.
41a	16a	"Go Baby Go"	Jennifer Hamburg	Abigail Nesbitt	February 26, 2021 (USA) March 7, 2021 (Canada)	TBA	N/A
Pip and Freddy try to make a baby snail named Sammy faster to help him win a T.O.T.S. race.
41b	16b	"Baby Freddy"	Peter Gaffney	Michael J. Smith	February 26, 2021 (USA) March 7, 2021 (Canada)	TBA	N/A
When Freddy loses his voice, while delivering a baby condor named Carson, a pair of nervous condor parents mistake him for their baby.
42a	17a	"Treasure Hunters"	Brandon Violette	Michael J. Smith & Josh Greer	March 5, 2021 (USA) March 14, 2021 (Canada)	TBA	N/A
In order to deliver a baby meerkat named Maya, a treasure hunt ensues.
42b	17b	"Up Up and Oh No"	Rick Suvalle	Abigail Nesbitt	March 5, 2021 (USA) March 14, 2021 (Canada)	TBA	N/A
Pip and Freddy accidentally let a baby orangutan named Oliver escape from his crate, and must climb after him.
43a	18a	"Pajama Party"	Rick Suvalle	Michael J. Smith & Josh Greer	March 12, 2021 (USA) April 4, 2021 (Canada)	TBA	N/A
When Mia and Lucky won't stop fighting with each other, Pip, Freddy, and K.C. have a pajama party to try and have them get along.
43b	18b	"The Bunny Bunch"	Sarah Eisenberg and Becky Wangberg	Abigail Nesbitt	March 12, 2021 (USA) April 4, 2021 (Canada)	TBA	N/A
Pip and Freddy deliver six baby bunnies to a family named the Hareingtons, but they have to babysit them as the parents construct a new nursery, because they only planned for one.
44a	19a	"Once Upon a Bedtime"	Becky Friedman	Abigail Nesbitt	March 19, 2021 (USA) March 21, 2021 (Canada)	TBA	N/A
Pip and Freddy lead JP and Lucky on an adventure to find Lucky's lost bedtime book titled "The Playful Little Puppy".
44b	19b	"Thunder and Frightening"	Jennifer Hamburg	Michael J. Smith & Josh Greer	March 19, 2021 (USA) March 21, 2021 (Canada)	TBA	N/A
Pip and Freddy go on a stormy delivery to deliver a drum-loving baby ostrich named Orville.
45a	20a	"Early Birds"	Brandon Violette	Michael J. Smith & Josh Greer	March 26, 2021 (USA) March 28, 2021 (Canada)	TBA	N/A
When a baby rooster named Rudy won’t stop waking everyone up, Pip and Freddy teach him when it's time to be quiet.
45b	20b	"Prank You Very Much"	Niki Lytton	Abigail Nesbitt	April 1, 2021 (USA) APRIL FOOLS April 2021 (Canada)	TBA	N/A
Pip and Freddy plan an April Fool's prank for Captain Beakman with their friends and Lucky, but it proves challenging due to her personal experiences.
47a	22a	"Zebra Zebra"	S : Rick Suvalle; S/T : Peter Gaffney	Abigail Nesbitt	April 30, 2021 (USA) May 1, 2021 (Canada)	TBA	N/A
Freddy realizes that twin zebra sisters, Zola and Zora, are unique in their own special ways.
47b	22b	"Snow Place Like Home"	Becky Friedman	Josh Greer	April 30, 2021 (USA) May 1, 2021 (Canada)	TBA	N/A
When Peggy and her family come to stay at T.O.T.S., Pip and Freddy try to make them feel right at home.
48a	23a	"Team Cutie Patooties"	Karissa Valencia	Abigail Nesbitt	May 7, 2021 (USA) May 16, 2021 (Canada)	TBA	N/A
When Freddy selects only babies to be on their team for the big T.O.T.S. ball game, Pip questions his decision.
48b	23b	"The Adorable Artist"	Brandon Violette	Josh Greer	May 7, 2021 (USA) May 16, 2021 (Canada)	TBA	N/A
Pip and Freddy encourage a baby python named Pollock to express himself through art.
49a	24a	"Home Tree Home"	Jennifer Hamburg	Abigail Nesbitt	May 21, 2021 (USA) May 23, 2021 (Canada)	TBA	N/A
Mia discovers a tiny tree sapling and insists on finding it a perfect home like other TOTS babies.
49b	24b	"Copy Cat"	Niki Lytton	Josh Greer	May 21, 2021 (USA) May 23, 2021 (Canada)	TBA	N/A
A game of 'Follow the Leader' with a bobcat named Bobbi, gets out of hand thanks to Lucky.
50a	25a	"Mia Goes to School"	Travis Braun	Abigail Nesbitt	June 18, 2021 (USA) June 20, 2021 (Canada)	TBA	N/A
Pip and Freddy aid a nervous Mia on her first day of school.
50b	25b	"Adventures in Tigersitting"	Guy Toubes	Josh Greer	June 18, 2021 (USA) June 20, 2021 (Canada)	TBA	N/A
When Tiberius accidentally disturbs his new sister, Tabitha, he must embrace his big brother expertise. Note: This is the final episode where Jet Jurgensmeyer voices Pip the Penguin before Tucker Chandler replaces him in Season 3.

=== Season 3 (2021–2022) ===
No. overall	No. in season	Title	Written by	Storyboard directed by	Original release date	Prod. code	US viewers (millions)
51a	1a	"Super Baby"	Brandon Violette	Josh Greer	July 9, 2021 (USA) July 11, 2021 (Canada)	TBA	N/A
A baby crab named Cody, loses his beloved security blankie to a baby dolphin named Darcy, who wants to wear it as a cape and pretend she's a superhero. Note: This is the first episode where Tucker Chandler voices Pip the Penguin, who replaces Jet Jurgensmeyer after the end of Season 2.
51b	1b	"Missing Mia"	Travis Braun	Abigail Nesbitt	July 9, 2021 (USA) July 11, 2021 (Canada)	TBA	N/A
When Mia heads to school for the day, Lucky feels confused and left out.
52a	2a	"Wilburt Woodbird"	Niki Lytton	Abigail Nesbitt	July 16, 2021 (USA) July 18, 2021 (Canada)	TBA	N/A
Mr. Woodbird can't wait to teach his nephew, Wilburt, how to be a builder, but Wilburt wants to take care of babies instead.
52b	2b	"A Nutty Delivery"	Ghia Godfree	Josh Greer	July 16, 2021 (USA) July 18, 2021 (Canada)	TBA	N/A
Pip and Freddy help a young chipmunk named Chico get over his fear of change when his family is moving.
53a	3a	"The Protective Papa"	Brandon Violette	Josh Greer	July 23, 2021 (USA) July 25, 2021 (Canada)	TBA	N/A
JP obsesses over keeping Lucky safe after he gets hurt at his birthday party.
53b	3b	"Freddy and the Furchoos"	Elise Allen	Abigail Nesbitt	July 23, 2021 (USA) July 25, 2021 (Canada)	TBA	N/A
Pip helps Freddy conquer his furchoos before it gets in the way of delivering a furry baby musk ox named Opal.
54a	4a	"Flamingos on Ice"	Niki Lytton	Abigail Nesbitt	July 30, 2021 (USA) August 1, 2021 (Canada)	TBA	N/A
Freddy can’t wait to show baby flamingo, Fiona, all the warm-weather games he loves.
54b	4b	"Bodhi and the Birdie"	John N. Huss	Josh Greer	July 30, 2021 (USA) August 1, 2021 (Canada)	TBA	N/A
After a crash landing, Bodhi must overcome his fear of flying in time to deliver a baby hawk named Hattie.
55b	5b	"Captain for a Day"	Niki Lytton	Abigail Nesbitt	August 20, 2021 (USA) August 22, 2021 (Canada)	TBA	N/A
When Captain Beakman steps out for a day, all the fliers compete for her position.
55a	5a	"The Brightest Baby"	Brandon Violette	Josh Greer	August 20, 2021 (USA) August 22, 2021 (Canada)	TBA	N/A
Pip and Freddy help a baby firefly named Frankie learn to shine her light.
56a	6a	"Manatee Out of Water"	Duke Doyle and Matt Sax	Abigail Nesbitt	September 10, 2021 (USA) September 5, 2021 (Canada)	TBA	N/A
Pip, Freddy, and KC, help a baby manatee named Malika play Bouncy-Ball, so they can break JP's record.
56b	6b	"The Not-So-Spooky Spider"	S : Dave Polsky; T : Ghia Godfree	Josh Greer	September 10, 2021 (USA) September 5, 2021 (Canada)	TBA	N/A
Freddy is too scared to deliver a baby spider named Stuart, but he must face his fear when he and Pip get separated during the little one's delivery.
57a	7a	"Cute as a Button"	Nick "Rocket" Rodriguez	Abigail Nesbitt	September 17, 2021 (USA) September 19, 2021 (Canada)	TBA	N/A
Pip and Freddy's latest delivery, a raccoon named Rae, locks them out of T.O.T.S because of her love for pushing buttons, and they must find a way to deliver her on time.
57b	7b	"It Takes a Village"	Brandon Violette	Josh Greer	September 17, 2021 (USA) September 19, 2021 (Canada)	TBA	N/A
Mr. Woodbird and the FlyBus get stuck in the Sunny Savannah while delivering loveys, so Pip and Freddy team up with some locals to help him out, including a rhino calf named Rusty.
58a	8a	"Trunklebee's Day Off"	Niki Lytton	Abigail Nesbitt	October 8, 2021 (USA) October 10, 2021 (Canada)	TBA	N/A
Pip and Freddy give Miss Trunklebee a day off to show their appreciation, but quickly realize how much they need her while watching Mia, Bucky, and Oki. Note: Oki and Bucky previously appeared in the past two seasons: "Night at the Nursery" from the first season, and "Bull of Energy" from the second season, respectively.
58b	8b	"Happy Go Lucky"	Robyn Brown	Josh Greer	October 8, 2021 (USA) October 10, 2021 (Canada)	TBA	N/A
Pip and Freddy try to help JP cheer up when he’s feeling blue, after his son, Lucky, visits his grandparents on his own for the first time.
59a	9a	"Teeny Tiny Tot"	Brandon Violette	Josh Greer	October 22, 2021 (USA) October 24, 2021 (Canada)	TBA	N/A
Pip and Freddy help a small mouse named Maddie do big things, by shrinking themselves down to her size.
59b	9b	"Ava and the Egg"	Scott Gray	Abigail Nesbitt	October 22, 2021 (USA) October 24, 2021 (Canada)	TBA	N/A
Ava gives up on speeding, after she makes a mistake with her delivery, one of two duckling twins, and Pip and Freddy help her realize everyone makes mistakes.
60a	10a	"Messin' Around"	Ghia Godfree	Josh Greer	November 12, 2021 (USA) November 14, 2021 (Canada)	TBA	N/A
Wilburt learns how to think outside the book when he has trouble keeping a baby warthog named Westley clean.
60b	10b	"Mia First"	Niki Lytton	Abigail Nesbitt	November 12, 2021 (USA) November 14, 2021 (Canada)	TBA	N/A
Mia has trouble letting anyone else have a turn going first when Ms. Trunklebee tells the Sky School students that they'll be throwing a Silly Hat Parade.
61b	11b	"The Ram-bunctious Baby"	Maria Escobedo	Abigail Nesbitt	November 26, 2021 (USA) November 28, 2021 (Canada)	TBA	N/A
JP tries to keep his latest delivery, a baby ram named Ricky, under control. But his attempts just make it more rambunctious. Note: This episode has the same lesson as the second season episode "Bull of Energy" being: rather than try to control someone's energetic personality, find a way for them to use their energy.
61a	11a	"The Great Fredamingo"	Brandon Violette	Josh Greer	November 26, 2021 (USA) November 28, 2021 (Canada)	TBA	N/A
When performing his own magic show, Freddy believes he accidentally turned his best friend Pip, into a lovey.
62a	12a	"Best Feathered Friends"	Niki Lytton	Josh Greer	December 10, 2021 (USA) December 12, 2021 (Canada)	TBA	N/A
When Belly Billy drops off his cousin at the T.O.T.S. Sky School, he and Pip bond with lots of games. This makes Freddy feel left out of Pip and Billy’s games, following a delivery of a baby octopus named Owen.
62b	12b	"The Prancing Pony"	James Eason Garcia	Abigail Nesbitt	December 10, 2021 (USA) December 12, 2021 (Canada)	TBA	N/A
Pip and Freddy struggle to deliver a pony named Preston who won’t stop seeking attention.
63a	13a	"The Family Tree"	Brandon Violette	Josh Greer	December 17, 2021 (USA) December 19, 2021 (Canada) January 1, 2022 (Mexico) (New years day)	TBA	N/A
Pip and Freddy team up with an Emperor Tamarin Family to save their home from a windstorm.
63b	13b	"Freddy's Never-Ending Birthday"	Nick "Rocket" Rodriguez	Abigail Nesbitt	December 17, 2021 (USA) December 19, 2021 (Canada) January 1, 2022 (Mexico) (New years day)	TBA	N/A
Freddy wishes for his birthday to be every day so Mia tries to make his wish come true, only for it to get in the way of delivering a snow owlet named Sheldon.
64a	14a	"Roundup at the Cutie Corral"	Niki Lytton	Josh Greer	January 14, 2022 (USA) January 16, 2022 (Canada)	TBA	N/A
Pip and Freddy give a skittish armadillo pup named Arnie a big cowboy hat to help him be brave.
64b	14b	"Freddy's Flamazing School of Flamanners"	Ghia Godfree	Abigail Nesbitt	January 14, 2022 (USA) January 16, 2022 (Canada)	TBA	N/A
When JP plans a tea party, Pip and Freddy try to help Lucky learn how to be polite.
65a	15a	"Bubble Trouble"	James Eason Garcia	Abigail Nesbitt	January 21, 2022 (USA) January 23, 2022 (Canada)	TBA	N/A
When Pip and Freddy create a bubble for a baby bear named Blossom, she gets carried away playing with it, and they all get trapped inside.
65b	15b	"Builder Birds"	Brandon Violette	Josh Greer	January 21, 2022 (USA) January 23, 2022 (Canada)	TBA	N/A
Pip and Freddy try to build a rocket-esque big kid bed for Sunny the Sloth without instructions. Note: The original title for this episode was "Some Assembly Required", but has since been renamed.
66a	16a	"Oh Brother"	Ghia Godfree	Abigail Nesbitt	February 4, 2022 (USA) February 6, 2022 (Canada)	TBA	N/A
Pip and Freddy deliver Zed's baby brother, Ned, to his family. Zed starts to get jealous of the attention Ned is getting.
66b	16b	"Professor Good Guy"	Niki Lytton	Josh Greer	February 4, 2022 (USA) February 6, 2022 (Canada)	TBA	N/A
Professor Peacock is determined to steal Mr. Woodbird's latest invention, but Halle changes his mind.
67b	17b	"The Helper-Bot Fifty Hundred (five thousand)"	Peter Gaffney	Abigail Nesbitt	February 25, 2022 (USA) February 27, 2022 (Canada)	TBA	N/A
Pip and Freddy enlist Mr. Woodbird's robot to do all their chores for them and trouble ensues.
67a	17a	"When Squirrels Fly"	Ghia Godfree	Josh Greer	February 25, 2022 (USA) February 27, 2022 (Canada)	TBA	N/A
Pip and Freddy discover their latest delivery is Suki.
68a	18a	"Puppy Dog Eyes"	Niki Lytton	Abigail Nesbitt	March 11, 2022 (USA) March 13, 2022 (Canada)	TBA	N/A
Pip and Freddy need to resist Luna's puppy dog eyes if they’re going to deliver her on time, but the latter has trouble doing so.
68b	18b	"Birds of a Feather, Stuck Together"	James Eason Garcia	Josh Greer	March 11, 2022 (USA) March 13, 2022 (Canada)	TBA	N/A
When JP and Freddy get stuck together, they must work together to make a delivery.
69a	19a	"Tooth on the Loose"	Ghia Godfree	Josh Greer	March 25, 2022 (USA) March 27, 2022 (Canada)	TBA	N/A
When Mia has her first baby tooth fall out, it accidentally gets sent on a delivery, after she initially tries to keep it out of fear of losing it to the Tooth Fairy.
69b	19b	"So Much to Sea"	Brandon Violette	Abigail Nesbitt	March 25, 2022 (USA) March 27, 2022 (Canada)	TBA	N/A
When Pip and Freddy go on an underwater adventure to deliver a squid named Stella, they struggle to adjust to a lack of light, and get lost trying to find her home.
70a	20a	"Every Baby Loves Freddy"	Niki Lytton	Abigail Nesbitt	April 1, 2022 (USA) (APRIL FOOLS) April 3, 2022 (Canada)	TBA	N/A
Three babies, a hedgehog, seal, and peacock, invite Freddy to play different games at the same time.
70b	20b	"Baby Bot"	James Eason Garcia	Josh Greer	April 1, 2022 (USA) (APRIL FOOLS) April 3, 2022 (Canada)	TBA	N/A
Red, Zed and Jed must deliver a robotic baby to pass their T.O.T.S. Junior Academy entrance exam, only to have a mix-up with Woodbird's Don't-Eat-My-Snack-O-Nator.
71a	21a.	"Super-Duper Switcheroo"	Brandon Violette	Josh Greer	April 22, 2022 (USA) April 24, 2022 (Canada)	TBA	N/A
On the day a reporter from Stork Magazine is set to do an interview with JP, a mishap causes him and Lucky to switch bodies. Now stuck in his son's fur, JP needs to direct him through a delivery with Pip and Freddy's help.
71b	21b	"Best Bird Detectives"	Nick "Rocket" Rodriguez	Abigail Nesbitt	April 22, 2022 (USA) April 24, 2022 (Canada)	TBA	N/A
Pip and Freddy’s sleuthing skills are put to the test as they team up with an owlet named Orma to find the source of a mysterious squeak sound.
72a	22a	"Family-versary"	Niki Lytton	Josh Greer	April 29, 2022 (USA) May 1, 2022 (Canada)	TBA	N/A
Pip volunteers to take a special family photo for Candace and Mia, but he gets carried away trying to make it perfect.
72b	22b	"Biggest Lovey Ever"	Ghia Godfree	Abigail Nesbitt	April 29, 2022 (USA) May 1, 2022 (Canada)	TBA	N/A
It's Wyatt the Whale's birthday, and Freddy wants to give him the biggest lovey possible as a present. But he, Pip, and Mr. Woodbird struggle to deliver the gift, along with some giant sized baby supplies.
73a	23a	"TOTS in Space"	Brandon Violette	Josh Greer	May 20, 2022 (USA) May 22, 2022 (Canada)	TBA	N/A
Pip and Freddy help Mr. Woodbird visit the Moon, only to end up in the middle of the Camel-Lot Desert.
73b	23b	"Tommy Triplebeak"	James Eason Garcia	Abigail Nesbitt	May 20, 2022 (USA) May 22, 2022 (Canada)	TBA	N/A
Freddy can’t wait to spend the day with Tommy Triplebeak but his idea of fun gets out of control.
74a	24a	"Jingle Birds"	Brandon Violette	Abigail Nesbitt	June 3, 2022 (USA) June 5, 2022 (Canada)	TBA	N/A
Freddy worries that he’ll be on Santa’s naughty list, after accidentally knocking down the T.O.T.S. Christmas tree, so he and Pip fly to the North Pole to clear things up, but the former keeps getting distracted helping people.
74b	24b	"The Iceberg Alley Winter Games"	James Eason Garcia	Josh Greer	June 3, 2022 (USA) June 5, 2022 (Canada)	TBA	N/A
Pip tries to win at the Iceberg Alley Winter Games but a sweater and hat knitted by Freddy hinders his performance.
75a	25a	"Baby Fliers"	Travis Braun	Abigail Nesbitt	June 10, 2022 (USA) June 12, 2022 (Canada)	TBA	N/A
JP reveals how he became a Super Duper Flier, along with how Pip and Freddy first met when they were babies.
75b	25b	"TOTS the Musical"	Niki Lytton	Josh Greer	June 10, 2022 (USA) June 12, 2022 (Canada)	TBA	N/A
A music loving fennec fox named Faye uses Mr Woodbird’s Sing-i-nator to make all T.O.T.S. sing.

== Shorts ==
=== Calling All T.O.T.S. ===
==== Season 1 ====
#	Episode
1	Mia the Kitten
2	Ellie the Elephant
3	Pablo the Puppy
4	Wyatt the Whale
5	Pearl the Piglet
6	Precious the Panda
7	Marty the Monkey
8	Blondie the Bunny
9	Sunny the Sloth
10	Didi the Deer

==== Season 2 ====
#	Episode
1	Sandy the Sea Turtle
2	Sebastian the Seal
3	Gio the Giraffe
4	Bucky the Bull
5	Peggy and Paul the Polar Bears
6	Stanley the Shark
7	Hazel the Husky
8	The Bunny Bunch
9	Mia and Lucky
10	Lily the Lemur
