= Calpurnio =

Spanish comic artist and illustrator (1927–2022)

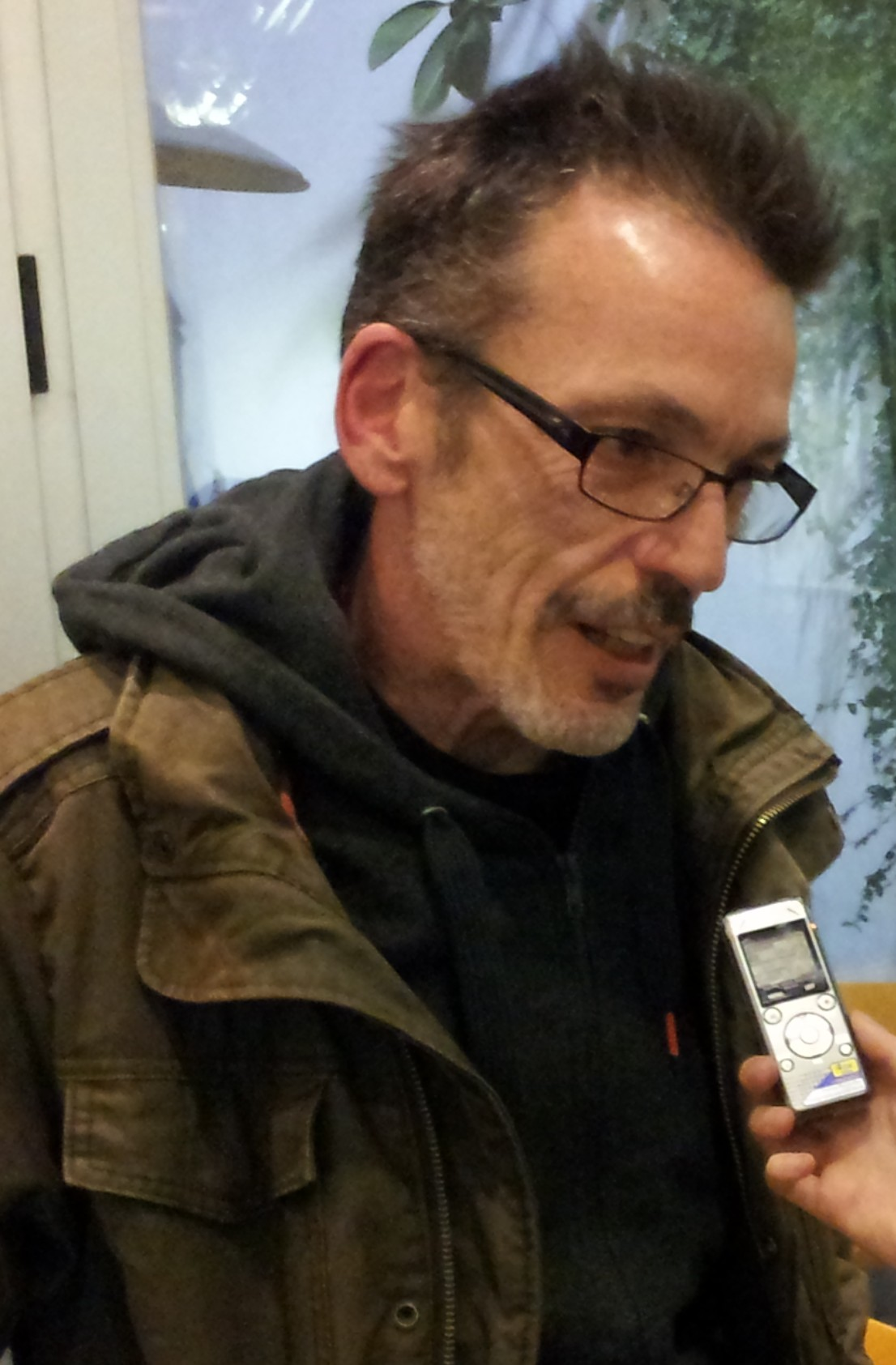
- Born: Eduardo Pelegrín Martínez de Pisón; 1959; Zaragoza, Spain
- Died: 15 December 2022 (aged 63); Valencia, Spain
- Occupation: Cartoonist

Eduardo Pelegrín Martínez de Pisón (1959 – 15 December 2022), best known as Calpurnio or Calpurnio Pisón (after the Roman gens Calpurnii Pisones), was a Spanish comic artist, illustrator, scriptwriter, animator and video jockey.

== Life and career ==
Born in Zaragoza, Pisón started his career in 1983 self-publishing the fanzine El Japo, which included his most famous work, the comic strip El Bueno de Cuttlas. Because of the crudeness of the publication's contents, he decided to hide his identity under the pseudonym Calpurnio. El Bueno de Cuttlas enjoyed a large success, and during the years it was published in a number of publications including Makoki, El Víbora, Heraldo de Aragón, El País, 20 minutos, and Revista Plaza, as well as in some comic albums. In 1991 the character was adapted in an award-winning animated television series, curated by the same Calpurnio. Other Calpurnio's comics include Proyecto X (1994) and Mundo Plasma (2016).

Besides comics, Calpurnio was also active as illustrator, among other things designing posters, merchandising, advertising and decorations in bullrings, as well as illustrating some literary classics such as Homer's Iliad and Odyssey for the Blackie Book series Clásicos Liberados. Starting from 1997 he was also active as a video jockey under the stage name ERRORvideo.

Calpurnio died of cancer on 15 December 2022, at the age of 63. At the time of his death he was working on a comic version of Laozi's Tao Te Ching.
