= Monster Island (2017 film) =

- Official poster
- Directed by: Leopoldo Aguilar
- Written by: Billy Frolick
- Produced by: Fernando de Fuentes; José C. García de Letona
- Starring: Phillip Vasquez; Roger L. Jackson; Johnny Rose; Fiona Hardingham; Katie Leigh; Eric Larsen; Michael Robles; Nancy Sullivan; Jenifer Beth Kaplan
- Edited by: Luciana Jauffred Gorostiza; Rhen Fontaine
- Music by: Kevin Smithers
- Production companies: Ánima Estudios; Discreet Arts Productions
- Distributed by: Corazón Films
- Release dates: 21 July 2017 (United Kingdom); 14 September 2017 (Mexico); 20 February 2021 (Spain)
- Running time: 80 minutes
- Countries: Mexico; Spain; India; United States; Bulgaria
- Languages: English; Spanish
- Budget: $1.04 million
- Box office: MX$18.9 million (US$2.1 million)

Monster Island (released as Isla Calaca in Mexico) is a 2017 English-language Mexican animated horror comedy film directed by Leopoldo Aguilar. The film was produced by Ánima Estudios and animated by India's Discreet Arts Production.

The film was first released in the United Kingdom on 21 July 2017, and later in Mexico on 14 September. The film was released in the United States on 1 September of the same year on home media and VOD platforms.

== Plot ==
Young Lucas finds out he is not human after he transforms into a monster in front of the most popular kids at school. His search for Monster Island and his real roots takes him on a journey that puts him face to face with more tentacles, fangs and far-out situations than he can shake one of his new wings at.

== Voice cast ==
=== Spanish-language cast (original) ===
- Memo Aponte as Lucas
- Octavio Rojas as Nicolas
- Pepe Toño Macías as Norcutt
- Alicia Barragán as Veronica
- Ángela Villanueva Vargas as Carlotta
- Luis Daniel Ramírez as Fergus
- Ricardo Tejedo as Giraldo
- Alan F. Velazquez & Gerardo Alonso as Shiro and Kuro

=== English-language cast (original) ===
- Phillip Adrian Vasquez as Lucas
- Roger L. Jackson as Nicolas
- Johnny Rose as Norcutt
- Alicia Barragán as Veronica
- Katie Leigh as Carlotta / Patrick's Mom
- Eric Larsen as Peter / Ant Monster
- Michael Robles as Cameron
- Nancy Sullivan as Dina / Old Lady / Teacher
- Jenifer Beth Kaplan as Melanie / Cameron's Mom / Patrick
- Joey Camen as Shiro / Fergus / Mayor's Assistant
- Wally Wingert as Kuro / Lagoon Monster
- Chuck Kourouklis as Durgo / Dock Master
- Erik Brada as Giraldo / Mongo
- Luis Daniel Ramírez Santiago as Watson
- Anthony Budai as Mayor

== Production ==
In an interview with El Universal, director Leopoldo Aguilar said the purpose of the film's story is to help the audience understand their roots and learn to accept them. Producer and Ánima COO José C. García de Letona mentioned about the film's "comedy and action" tone, in comparison to the Leyendas franchise.

=== Animation ===
The film was animated entirely in computer-generated imagery, done by India's Discreet Arts Productions which has previously collaborated with Anima Estudios' previous films including Guardians of Oz and Top Cat Begins.

=== Music ===
The film's original music was composed by Kevin Smithers.

== Release ==
To date, the film has been released in Mexico, United States, and the United Kingdom, as well as Asian territories including China and South Korea.

The release in China marked a new first for production company Ánima Estudios, to which Leopoldo Aguilar stated that the film's story was created for a global setting, and not Mexico where the film was produced.

=== Box office ===
The film debuted at #3 in Mexico, grossing $6.86 million (est. US$0.4 million) on its opening weekend. It grossed a total of $18.9 million pesos.

=== Reception ===
The film was met with negative reviews upon its release. On Rotten Tomatoes, it has a "Rotten" score of "18%" based on 11 reviews. On Tomatazos, the film has a score of "10%".

== Awards and nominations ==
=== Awards and nominations ===
Year	Award	Category	Nominees	Result
2017	14th Premios Canacine	Mejor Película de Animación	Leopoldo Aguilar	Won

== See also ==
- Ánima Estudios
- Guardians of Oz
- Top Cat Begins
