= Billy Frolick =

American screenwriter and film director

- Born: William Frolick; Long Island, New York, U.S.
- Education: New York University
- Occupations: Screenwriter; director
- Years active: 2005–present
- Notable work: Madagascar; Monster Island; Paw Patrol: The Movie

William Frolick is an American screenwriter and film director.

== Biography ==
Born and raised in Long Island, New York, Frolick graduated from NYU film school, where he studied under professor (and Martin Scorsese mentor) Haig Manoogian. In the eighties, Frolick moved to Los Angeles and worked at various agencies, studios and production companies as a script reader, agency assistant, and development executive. When the Writers Guild of America, west went on strike in 1988, his career as a journalist began.

His first Premiere Magazine story, “Sink or Float,” served as the prototype for the magazine's popular “Life at the Bottom” column. Frolick's work has also appeared in The New Yorker, Movieline, TV Guide, The Huffington Post, and the Los Angeles Times, for which he interviewed such personalities as Milton Berle and Richard Pryor. He also conducted dozens of videotaped interviews with survivors of the Holocaust for Steven Spielberg’s "Survivors of the Shoah" project.

Frolick has served as the pseudonymous author of several book-length parodies, including The Philistine Prophecy, Dumpisms, and The Ditches of Edison County, a national bestseller which was translated into Japanese and Italian. In 2005, Atria Books, a division of Simon & Schuster, released The Five People You Meet in Hell; the latest, 2013's Downtrodden Abbey, a spoof of the award-winning TV series, is from St. Martin's Press. Frolick's 1995 Dutton book What I Really Want to Do is Direct tracked seven film school graduates over three years. Academy Award-winning director Steven Soderbergh wrote, “If you are reading my words right now, you need to buy this book. Billy Frolick has produced the definitive text on what it's like to make a start in the film business. I found it absolutely riveting.” And from Publishers Weekly: “Essential reading.”

Frolick's directing debut, It is What it Is, a full-length feature from his original screenplay, stars Jonathan Silverman (Weekend at Bernie's) and featured Stephen Tobolowsky (Memento) and Joshua Malina (The West Wing). It is What it Is screened at several global festivals, including the 2003 New York International Independent Film & Video Festival, where it won the Audience Award for Best Picture, as well as prizes for Best Screenplay and Best Directorial Debut. The film's cultural significance was noted by William Safire in his March 5, 2006 New York Times Sunday Magazine column "On Language," entitled "It Is What It Is." "A burst of the sentence's activity," Safire wrote, "followed Billy Frolick's movie with that title in 2001."

For DreamWorks Animation, Frolick has written the feature screenplays Holy Cow (with Chicken Run writer Karey Kirkpatrick) and Madagascar (with directors Eric Darnell and Tom McGrath, and Mark Burton, co-writer of Wallace & Gromit: Curse of the Were-Rabbit). Madagascar stars the voice talents of Ben Stiller, Chris Rock, David Schwimmer and Jada Pinkett Smith, and grossed over a half a billion dollars worldwide during its 2005 theatrical release. Frolick's recent credits include Monster Island from Ánima Estudios in 2017, The Big Trip in 2019, and the 2021 film adaptation of the Nick Jr. Channel's animated series, PAW Patrol.

In addition to moderating and appearing on many international film school and festival panels, Frolick spent five years an adjunct instructor at New York University's Tisch School of the Arts, where he taught screenwriting.

== Filmography ==
- It Is What It Is (2005) - Director and writer
- Madagascar (2005)
- The Jungle Book (2014)
- Monster Island (2017)
- The Big Trip (2019)
- Paw Patrol: The Movie (2021)
