= Paw Patrol: The Movie =

2021 animated film by Cal Brunker

- Theatrical release poster
- Directed by: Cal Brunker
- Screenplay by: Billy Frolick; Cal Brunker; Bob Barlen
- Story by: Billy Frolick
- Based on: Paw Patrol by Keith Chapman
- Produced by: Jennifer Dodge
- Starring: Iain Armitage; Marsai Martin; Yara Shahidi; Kim Kardashian (Note: Credited as Kim Kardashian West.); Randall Park; Dax Shepard; Tyler Perry; Jimmy Kimmel; Will Brisbin
- Edited by: Ed Fuller
- Music by: Heitor Pereira
- Production company: Spin Master Entertainment
- Distributed by: Elevation Pictures (Canada); Paramount Pictures (Worldwide) (Note: Simultaneously released on the Paramount+ streaming service in the United States through Nickelodeon Movies.)
- Release dates: August 8, 2021 (Vue Leicester Square); August 20, 2021 (Canada and United States)
- Running time: 86 minutes
- Country: Canada
- Language: English
- Budget: $26 million
- Box office: $151 million

Paw Patrol: The Movie is a 2021 Canadian animated adventure comedy film based on the television series Paw Patrol created by Keith Chapman. It was directed by Cal Brunker, who co-wrote the screenplay with Billy Frolick and Bob Barlen, and features the voices of Iain Armitage, Marsai Martin, Yara Shahidi, Kim Kardashian, Randall Park, Dax Shepard, Tyler Perry, Jimmy Kimmel, and Will Brisbin. Several cast members from the television series also reprised their roles, and with others joining the cast. In the film, Ryder and the Paw Patrol pups are called to Adventure City in order to stop the recently elected Mayor Humdinger from wreaking havoc.

Ronnen Harary announced that Spin Master Entertainment was "considering whether to extend the Paw Patrol franchise into feature films at some point in the next 12 to 24 months" in November 2017. Development began in February 2020, with Brunker attached to direct, and Barlen and Frolick attached to write the screenplay. Voice casting took place from October 2020 to May 2021. Production was done remotely due to the COVID-19 pandemic. The film was produced almost entirely in Canada; according to Brunker, "95 percent of everything" happened in Canada, with the exception being some audio recording.

Paw Patrol: The Movie premiered at the Vue West End in London on August 8, 2021, and was theatrically released in Canada on August 20, by Elevation Pictures and in the United States by Paramount Pictures. It was also made available on Paramount+ on the same day in the United States. The film received mixed to positive reviews from critics and was a box office success, grossing $151 million against a budget of $26 million. A sequel, Paw Patrol: The Mighty Movie was released in 2023, and a third film, Paw Patrol: The Dino Movie, was released on August 14, 2026.

== Plot ==
After being called by Cap'n Turbot to rescue a truck driver who has crashed through a suspension bridge, the Paw Patrol receives a message from a dachshund named Liberty, who informs them that their arch-nemesis Mayor Humdinger has just taken over nearby Adventure City in a fixed election. Chase initially refuses to go, as he has PTSD from being abandoned by his original owners in the city when he was younger, but reluctantly agrees to go after Ryder assures him everything will be fine.

As Ryder and the pups settle into their new headquarters, Humdinger travels to a meteorology laboratory and commandeers a Cloud Catcher designed to suction up small clouds for research. Despite the warnings of head meteorologist Dr. Kendra Wilson, Humdinger uses the device to keep the city constantly free of rain. He later attempts to set off too many fireworks at once at a show, and the Paw Patrol, aided by Liberty, suit up to respond to the ensuing chaos.

During the response, Chase sees some citizens trapped on a balcony and parachutes down to rescue them, but he forgets to take off his parachute and gets blown over the railing by a wind gust, badly frightening him. The next day, Humdinger unveils a loop-the-loop extension he has designed for the local el train; the structure quickly breaks, leaving a train stranded upside down atop a loop. Ryder sends Chase up to a rooftop to zip-line across and rescue the passengers, but Chase freezes in panic. Skye rescues him, and Marshall saves the passengers instead.

After the train rescue, Ryder advises Chase to take a break. Chase angrily accuses Ryder of betraying his trust and giving up on him, and runs away. However, he is captured and taken to an obedience school converted into a dog pound. Liberty allows herself to be captured as well so she can speak with Chase and the other impounded dogs. The rest of the Paw Patrol follows Liberty, breaking into the pound and releasing the prisoners. As the other pups return to headquarters, Ryder takes Chase to the intersection where he had found Chase as a small puppy, and explains that he adopted Chase because he saw bravery in him.

Later, Humdinger reveals an extension he has added to the city's tallest skyscraper, putting his office at the very top. Kendra attempts to warn an indifferent Humdinger that the Cloud Catcher is being overworked and will soon dangerously malfunction. The machine goes critical, unleashing a hurricane on the town. Kendra calls the Paw Patrol to respond; they suit up, and Ryder names Liberty as their newest member and gives her a motor scooter to ride.

As the pups help the citizens take cover, Ryder ascends to Humdinger's office and convinces him to evacuate by getting on the elevator. Ryder manually releases the elevator cables to quickly lower Humdinger and his kittens to the ground; he attempts to rappel down after them, but the storm blows the tower extension into another building, trapping Ryder in the debris. Seeing the tower fall, Chase uses a special motorcycle with suction cup tires to ride up the side of a skyscraper, arriving at the gap where the falling tower split its neighboring building. After briefly freezing up again when he realizes he cannot use his grappling hook, Chase remembers Ryder's words about his bravery and takes a leap of faith across the gap, finding Ryder trapped in the rubble on the other side and freeing him. They hurry down to safety, while Skye sacrifices her helicopter to destroy the Cloud Catcher and end the storm.

Once the weather clears, Chase arrests Humdinger for gross negligence, public endangerment, and dognapping and he gets removed from office. The Paw Patrol is later given the key to Adventure City in a major ceremony held by Kendra and news reporter Marty Muckraker. As Ryder gives Liberty her own pup tag and collar to make her a true member of the team, one of the former pound dogs calls the team for help, and they happily depart for another rescue.

== Voice cast ==
- Iain Armitage as Chase, a brave 7-year-old German Shepherd who serves as a police pup. Armitage found the role special and enjoyable. He said, "It's a new challenge because you don't get to convey anything with your body movements… that's all the animator's job," he then explained: "You can only use your voice to convey whatever you're trying to show. But it's really fun to do animation." Armitage replaces Justin Paul Kelly from the series.
- Marsai Martin as Liberty, a long-haired Dachshund who grew up and lives in Adventure City and a crowd dog who becomes the newest member of the PAW Patrol. Martin said this particular role was unique because it hits close to home. Martin expressed her feelings about her role, "She's so wild and a free spirit. She's so energetic and fun, and I feel like she'd actually make a perfect fit into the PAW Patrol because of how amazing and wild she is."
- Ron Pardo as:
  - Mayor Humdinger, the Paw Patrol's arch-nemesis from Foggy Bottom who is elected the mayor of nearby Adventure City. Pardo said he drew inspiration for Mayor Humdinger's voice from mixing impressions of a Dudley Do-Right cartoon character with a well-known American entertainer from the 1930s-1950s.
  - Cap'n Turbot, a sea captain and animal expert, and a close friend of the Paw Patrol.
    - Pardo reprises both roles from the series.
- Yara Shahidi as Dr. Kendra Wilson, a scientist who works at a university.
- Kim Kardashian as Delores, a Poodle who is working at an animal shelter after being jailed in the Fuzzy Buddies obedience school. Kardashian said she was excited to voice the part, thrilled that her children now consider her a "cool mom".
- Randall Park as Butch, a burly man and one of Mayor Humdinger's security guards who attempt to keep the pups out of Adventure City.
- Dax Shepard as Ruben, a skinny man and another of Mayor Humdinger's security guards. On voicing his character role, Shepard stated that Paw Patrol "was the first show he was forced to watch after becoming a dad but admitted that he actually enjoys it", adding: "that earned him some serious cred with his kids". He concluded: "I get to reintroduce my kids to that experience of going to the movies that I valued so much growing up".
- Tyler Perry as Gus, a truck driver. Perry, on his role, saying that his 6-year-old son Aman is also thrilled that his father is involved in the film. "He loves Skye and Chase and Zuma. I know the theme song like the back of my mind," he stated in an interview. "...That's the reason I said yes. I really wanted to be a part of something that he could appreciate as much as I do."
- Jimmy Kimmel as Marty Muckraker, the wig-wearing news anchor of the Adventure City News Network. Kimmel also had trouble convincing his kids of his role in the film. "I have been telling them, trying to explain to them that Daddy's in the Paw Patrol movie," the late-night host jokes. "I'm hopeful this will make me a big shot, at least for a couple of days."
- Will Brisbin as Ryder, a 10-year-old boy who leads the Paw Patrol. Brisbin had to keep his role a closely guarded secret for some time, which he found difficult as his nine-year-old brother is a huge Paw Patrol fan. Brisbin replaces Beckett Hipkiss from the series.
- Keegan Hedley as Rubble, a determined 5-year-old English Bulldog who serves as a construction pup. He became the main comic relief character in the film as opposed to the series, so Hedley was encouraged to improvise during his recording. Hedley reprises his role from the series.
- Lilly Bartlam as Skye, a happy-go-lucky 7-year-old Cockapoo who serves as an aviator pup. Bartlam reprises her role from the series.
- Kingsley Marshall as Marshall, a loyal, but clumsy, 6-year-old Dalmatian who serves as a firefighting pup. Marshall reprises his role from the series.
- Callum Shoniker as Rocky, a clever 6-year-old mixed-breed dog who serves as a recycling pup. Shoniker previously voiced the Copycat from the Mighty Pups, Charged Up sub-series and replaces Jackson Reid from the series.
- Shayle Simons as Zuma, an energetic 5-year-old chocolate Labrador who serves as an aquatic rescue pup. Simons reprises his role from the series.
- Kim Roberts as Mayor Goodway, the mayor of Adventure Bay. Roberts reprises her role from the series.
- Paul Braunstein as a tough guy on a subway.
- Monique Alvarez as Carmen, a entrepreneur and the owner of a local bodega/grocery store.
- Neil Crone as Tony, the proprietor of the namesake of his grocery store.
- Jamillah Ross as a camerawoman working for Marty Muckraker.
- Josh Robert Thompson as the fireworks technician that Mayor Humdinger enlisted to pull off his fireworks show.
- Joe Pingue as Barney, an Old English Sheepdog and inmate at Fuzzy Buddies obedience school.
- Charles Gallant as Harris, an overweight Labrador Retriever and inmate at Fuzzy Buddies obedience school.
- Richard Binsley as Rocket, a Jack Russell Terrier and inmate at Fuzzy Buddies obedience school.
- Raoul Bhaneja as dad
- Saara Chaudry as daughter

Five side characters from the series also make non-speaking cameo appearances in the film: Francois Turbot, Katie, Mr. Porter, Farmer Al, and Farmer Yumi.

== Production ==
=== Development ===
In November 2017, Ronnen Harary confirmed that Spin Master was "currently considering whether to extend the Paw Patrol franchise into feature films at some point in the next 12 to 24 months". Animation tests were conducted in 2017 to measure how the characters "would translate onto the big screen" and the company developed a film script.

Development of the film was confirmed on February 21, 2020, with Cal Brunker attached as director while Spin Master Entertainment's president, Jennifer Dodge serves as the film's producer. Production was done in both the United States and Canada. On March 13, 2021, an exclusive first look of the film was shown during the Nickelodeon Kids' Choice Awards 2021.

Dodge stated that they were excited about the partnership with Paramount Pictures and Nickelodeon Movies to bring the franchise to the big screen. She adds, "This first foray into the arena of feature film marks a significant strategic expansion for Spin Master Entertainment and our properties. This demonstrates our commitment to harnessing our own internal entertainment production teams to develop and deliver IP in a motion picture format and allows us to connect our characters to fans through shared theatrical experiences."

Dodge said, "For us, it was important to be able to tell a deeper character story than what they've been able to do with the series." She also explained, "And to tell it in a way that a child really can understand and relate to, and maybe even their parents get a deeper meaning from it. You can have a hard day at school or daycare and you can rise above those difficulties and you can come through on the other side. It doesn't mean you're never scared, it doesn't mean you don't doubt yourself. But, if at the end of the day, you really believe in yourself and you have people around you who believe in you, you can overcome it."

"When the chance came to pitch my take on the movie, I was able to bring all of their experience and what my kids loved about the show to the pitch, and I think that really helped," says Brunker. "Our take was, we really wanted to build this around the emotional journey of one character, so it felt like more of a theatrical experience. You go on a journey with one of these characters overcoming their struggles, and the whole team is involved, but we felt that that was the best way to bring an audience deeper into the story."

=== Casting ===
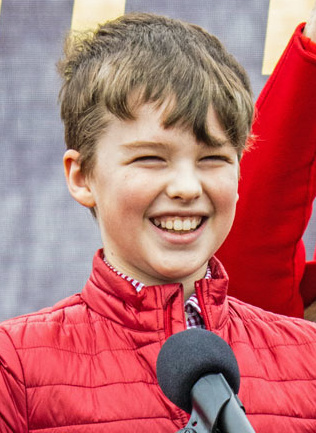
Iain Armitage replaces Justin Paul Kelly as the voice of Chase.

On October 15, 2020, Iain Armitage, Marsai Martin, Yara Shahidi, Kim Kardashian, Randall Park, Dax Shepard, Tyler Perry, and Jimmy Kimmel were announced as part of the cast. On May 3, 2021, the cast and characters were announced. Adam Levine, Perry and Kardashian joined the cast because their respective children were fans of the show. For the role of Ryder, more than 1,000 people auditioned before Will Brisbin, a 15-year-old actor from Sherwood Park, Alberta, Canada, got the role.

On July 14, it was announced that Ronan Keating, Richard Arnold, Sam Faiers and Tom Fletcher were added to the cast as part of the voice cameos for the dubs in the UK and Ireland.

During an interview with Collider, Brunker spoke about enjoying the voice cast overall. "The core cast of pups and Ryder are all kids, and that was new for us and really wonderful. We really worked with them to try to get true, meaningful performances out of all the characters, and I thought they did an amazing job. The character of Chase, played by Iain [Armitage], goes on such a wonderful emotional journey that's a little bit unexpected, and he just brought so much to it. He broke our hearts in some moments. You really end up rooting for him. In terms of improvisation, I would say Marsai's deliveries were the things that were most surprising. She almost couldn't do anything bad. When we were going through the takes, it was like, "This is great. This is great in a different way. And this is great in a different way." She was wonderful and brought so much energy to it. Everybody was wonderful. Dax [Shepard] is the nicest guy, who was game on for everything. Tyler Perry was thrilled to be a part of it. His son is a big fan, and he certainly loves to improvise and do lots of takes. We couldn't have had a better cast or a better experience for recording them."

In an interview with Screen Rant, Iain Armitage spoke about the film and how he aspires to be like his canine counterpart Chase, ahead of the film's home entertainment release. He stated about the film's main character, "Chase is a fun, funny, smart, brave, loyal dog. And he's a police dog, and he's sort of the, I don't think he's the head of the team, but he's really on top of things. I think he's very cool under pressure. He's very helpful. And he always loves to help other people. And he's always very kind, which I think is very important. And I think I try to be like him in everyday life. I don't always succeed, but I try."

According to Armitage, "The cool thing about voice-over is, you can't convey things with your body because, of course, they don't see it. So you sort of have to have everything that you're going to be doing for the character come through in your voice, which is hard, but it's also kind of fun. It's a fun challenge, but on the upside, you can show up to work in pajamas, and they won't get mad at you. So that balances out. But I think just trying to really bring emotion into my voice in some of those scenes and to really make it clear that I care about Ryder [Will Brisbin] and my fellow pups on the team."

=== Writing ===
On February 21, 2020, Bob Barlen announced that he would co-write the screenplay with Billy Frolick. Director Cal Brunker, who also wrote the film along with his childhood friend Bob Barlen and Billy Frolick, came to the film with a solid understanding of the characters thanks to his own kids.

Screenwriter Barlen described the main character to be focused on in the film:

"Chase is kind of like the quarterback. Chase sort of seems like the main character, and so being able to expand and kind of have a character who fails and who has to overcome an obstacle is important. We were able to do more than the TV show time allows. Starting in Adventure Bay, you see him as that same perfect pup from the show where he's executing things flawlessly. That's really where we were able to expand on his backstory and create something that would be worthy of the feature film. So, you're seeing him for the first time really ever make mistakes and mess up and come to terms with not being perfect, and then pushing through and overcoming that fear. That was really something that we were excited about in terms of telling a story."

Brunker adds, "At its core, the movie is about what it means to be scared, and how to overcome your fears. It felt really important to be doing something that we could share with people at this time as the movie comes out. I think people are coming out of this time of fear and uncertainty, and I think the movie has a lot to say about that. And we really feel proud that hopefully this is going to be one of the first movies that people get to see in theaters again."

The film also represented the fulfillment of a lifetime dream for Bob Barlen and Cal Brunker, who had been making films together for decades. Brunker had known Barlen since they attended high school, and would make films with him later into their respective careers: "Back before we ever got a chance to make a movie, Bob and I went to Hollywood for the first time, and we actually paid to go on the Paramount lot tour. You know, you get to see behind the gates. We said to each other, wouldn't it be amazing if one day we were making a movie for Paramount? Well, we're six or seven weeks away from our first movie for Paramount coming out. And to be entrusted with such a beloved brand for so many people and to be able to share that with the world, this is a dream come true for us. It's been something we've been working towards for a long time and, and it's a real gift."

=== Animation ===
On November 8, 2019, it was announced that Mikros Animation in Montreal would handle the animation. There are 250 filmmakers with a team of about 60 devoted to the animation. Their biggest challenge was creating high-quality theatrical animation that didn't lose the style of the series. They were also especially interested in creating action scenes that had more of a realistic quality.

While they wanted to focus on the backstory of one character, it was also important to them to add a new female pup to the crew, since the character Skye is usually the only female on the team. New pups often appear in the series for a specific adventure to round out the team, but then are not necessarily in every episode going forward.

Barlen stated about adding a new pup to the film: "For us, in terms of actually creating Liberty, it was really fun because one of the nice things was that we were able to create a character that maybe was a bit different than the other pups. All the pups in the Paw Patrol are perfect and they're great. They're a certain way, but Liberty has got a little bit of an edge to her, which is nice. Having her experience and seeing her experiencing the film from her point of view, as she relates to the Paw Patrol, is really fun. And then, in terms of Marsai Martin who plays her, she's such an incredible actress. It was such a gift that she agreed to do it because she really brings the character to life. We couldn't imagine her being played in a better way by a better character, so we were really looking to have her on." Brunker says that Liberty is a new character, which allows them to write differently for her than the other pups. They also knew when she grow up in Adventure City, it justifies her having a little bit 'thicker' skin and a tougher way of talking. He stated that it is fun to juxtapose with the attitudes that the other people used to from the regular core team of pups.

Brunker stated: "For me, it started really young with drawing and being a visual thinker and expressing myself visually. The idea of being able to create almost anything you can imagine in animation is something that I find incredibly attractive..." while Barlen agrees, saying, "One of the nice things about animated movies, just from growing up on animated films and loving them well past when I was grown, is that it's so many people coming together and being able to make a film on a large scale that goes out so wide across the world. One of the exciting things about being a filmmaker is that your work is seen by hundreds of thousands or millions of people. Animation allows us to work at a scale where we can do something spectacular and really special on screen."

"My daughter is a huge Skye fan", says Brunker. "She was four when we started making this movie. So, we wanted to give Skye some really big, exciting moments. We also felt, just in terms of bringing something fresh and new to the team, a new girl pup would be wonderful. Because she's new for the movie, we wanted to make her stand out. We thought that because she was from the city we could make her a little tougher, a little more rough around the edges than the other pups are, and that would bring something fresh to that world as well."

Dodge and Brunker both thought the style of the animation needed to remain true to the series, but with some significant adjustments to give it a more theatrical feel. According to Brunker, they wanted to redesign some things noticed in the movie: "The back legs of the dogs actually look and function like real dog legs and in the TV show they're kind of more cartoony; just kind of stick legs. We felt it would allow them to move more like real dogs, and if we could push the realism of the movement, then it would make the fact that they're doing these great big rescues and all this heroic stuff even more exciting."

At a reported budget of $26 million, the CGI animation is more polished and textured than the series, with Brunker and his team reshaping and rebuilding every character, vehicle and environment from scratch. Aside from some voice recording in Los Angeles (including recordings from most of the cast remotely) and orchestral scoring in Nashville, "95 percent of everything" happened in Canada, according to Brunker.

=== Music ===
Heitor Pereira composed the music for the film. He previously collaborated with director Brunker on The Nut Job 2: Nutty by Nature. On June 2, 2021, it was confirmed that Maroon 5 lead singer Adam Levine had provided an original song, titled "Good Mood". It was written by Shellback, Savan Kotecha, Oscar Görres and Adam Levine; Shellback and Oscar Görres are the producers, while Savan Kotecha serves as the executive producer. The track was officially released on August 6, and sent to Italian radio on October 1, 2021.

Another song, titled "The Use in Trying", was announced on August 2, 2021, as well as the official release on August 10, co-written by Alessia Cara (who performs the track) and Jon Levine, who additionally serves as producer. Levine stated that "her one-of-a-kind voice weaves a beautiful song that captures the sadness and uncertainty during a pinnacle moment in the film".

Original songs performed for the film include:

No.	Title	Performer(s)	Length
1.	"Something Right"	Kiki Riggs
2.	"Good Mood"	Adam Levine	3:30
3.	"The Use in Trying"	Alessia Cara	3:12
4.	"Tear the Roof Off"	Spilt Milk
5.	"That's My Girl"	Fifth Harmony	3:24
6.	"Somebody Sometimes"	Fitz and the Tantrums	2:19
7.	"PAW Patrol Theme (Reimagined)"	The Math Club	1:30

== Release ==
=== Theatrical and streaming ===
During Spin Master's first quarter 2019 earnings conference call, an animated theatrical film based on the series was announced to be "in the works" with an August 2021 theatrical release date. On April 24, 2020, the film's theatrical release was announced to be August 20, 2021. The film was also available to stream on Paramount+ in the U.S. on the same day it released in theaters. Because Canadian distribution is handled by Elevation Pictures, the Canadian version of Paramount+ did not initially offer the movie, and it is unknown if it will. In July 2024, the film was made available to stream on Netflix in the United States.

In July 2021, Paramount Pictures UK and Ireland announced that the film would be released in British and Irish theatres on August 9, 2021. This version also retained the voice actors of the British dub.

The film had its red carpet premiere at the Vue Leicester Square in London on August 8, 2021. Paw Patrol: The Movie was released in China on January 14, 2022.

=== Marketing ===
By October 2020, the number of UK marketing partners have signed to promote Paw Patrol: The Movie. It includes Spin Master, Play by Play, Crayola, VTech, Sambro, RMS International, Kiddieland, Blues, Fashion UK, Aykroyd TDP, Amscan, Character World, Worlds Apart, Kinnerton, Seabrook, Yoplait, Beiersdorf, Signature Gifts, Egmont, Danilo, and DNC. On April 26, 2021, it was announced that Jakks Pacific and Disguise acquired the new rights as the toy and costume partner based on the film. The Halloween costumes and accessories from Disguise was available online, at retailers and Halloween specialty stores was also available in fall 2021.

On June 30, 2021, Mattel purchased rights to create a selection of items under its Mega Bloks and Uno brands which include more than 10 products featuring the characters from the film. The line of products was available in fall 2021.

A series of books based on the film was published on July 13, 2021. A line of action figures and toys collection by Spin Master was released on August 1, 2021, after July 15 presale. In June 2021, PetPlate announced its partnership for the launch of the film.

In July, Marston's made a deal with Paramount Pictures to launch the exclusive meal deal and collectible mask offer across 270 pubs ahead of the film release in the UK. The kids' meal deal offer ran throughout August, and it also includes the merchandise, such as six collectible character masks and activity sheets. Additional marketing partners for the film included Build-A-Bear, Hasbro, Kellogg's, Campbell's, Kraft Heinz, and Random House Children's Books, while ViacomCBS has partnered with retailers such as Walmart, Target, Amazon, Kroger, and LIDL.

=== Home media ===
Paramount Home Entertainment released Paw Patrol: The Movie on digital on October 26, 2021, then on DVD and Blu-ray on November 2, 2021. The digital release features hours of entertainment with exclusive bonus content, including a look at the team, additional news reports with reporter Marty Muckraker (voiced by Jimmy Kimmel) and a sing-along with a reimagined Paw Patrol theme song lyric video. It also includes the bonus episodes with one never-before-seen episode from the Nickelodeon series, and a never-before-seen episode of Blaze and the Monster Machines. When the film was released on disc, it entered the national NPD VideoScan First Alert sales chart at No. 2, debuting at No. 3 on the dedicated Blu-ray Disc chart.

=== Television broadcasts ===
Paw Patrol: The Movie aired on Nickelodeon on November 18, 2022. Following its debut, Paw Patrol: The Movie encored on the following Saturday (November 19) and Sunday (November 20).

== Reception ==
=== Box office ===
Paw Patrol: The Movie grossed $40.1 million in the United States and Canada, and $111.3 million in other territories, for a worldwide total of $151.4 million.

In the United States and Canada, Paw Patrol: The Movie was released alongside Reminiscence, The Night House, and The Protégé as well as the limited release of Flag Day and was initially projected to gross around $7–9 million from 3,184 theaters in its opening weekend. After making $4.5 million on its first day, estimates were increased to $12–14 million. It went on to debut to $13 million, finishing second behind holdover Free Guy; 88% of the audience was made up of families, 63% being under the age of 25. The opening was noteworthy because Regal Cinemas, the second-largest chain in the U.S., refused to carry the film due to its day-and-date release. The film fell 50% in its second weekend to $6.6 million, finishing in third. It then made $4 million in its third weekend, declining 40% and finishing in fifth place.

Worldwide, Paw Patrol: The Movie premiered in six markets, making $5.8 million in its first weekend, including a $2.3 million opening in France and a $3.2 million opening in the United Kingdom. In its second weekend, the film made $12.8 million in 39 markets; the top countries were Germany ($2.6 million), the Netherlands ($1.1 million), Mexico ($864,000), France, and the United Kingdom. It also had a South Korean opening in a mere 240 theaters, a decision by the Korea Theater Association to release local titles instead. In its third, the film was screened in 46 markets and grossed $10.3 million, which included #1 openings in Spain, Argentina, and Chile.

=== Critical response ===
On the review aggregator website Rotten Tomatoes, the film holds an approval rating of 82% based on 49 reviews, with an average rating of 6.3/10. On Metacritic, the film has a weighted average score of 50 out of 100, based on 14 critics, indicating "mixed or average reviews". Audiences polled by CinemaScore gave the film an average grade of "A−" on an A+ to F scale, while PostTrak reported 81% of audience members gave it a positive score, with 66% saying they would definitely recommend it.

Randy Myers of The Mercury News gave the film three stars out of four and said, "This old-fashioned, G-rated animated children's film (young children, that is, not teens or tweens) does everything it intends to do. And does it well." Kristen Page-Kirby of The Washington Post gave two and a half stars out of four and said, "A better movie than it needs to be, with some neat visuals, an outstanding score and a story that, while simple, is well told." Glenn Kenny of The New York Times called the film, "Entirely toddler-friendly and irony-free".

Nate Adams of The Only Critic gave the film a B, and wrote in his review, "I think three to six-year-olds are going to wince with glee at the sight of their favorite puppers saving the day, but the parents who are forced to go along for the ride will appreciate the film's cheery sense of humor and educational elements." Lisa Giles-Keddie of HeyUGuys gave the film four stars out of five and said, "A relentlessly entertainment big screen outing for the familiar pups. A perfect slice of summer cinema for all the family." James Mottram of South China Morning Post gave the film three stars out of five, saying "Paw Patrol: The Movie is a solidly entertaining film for kids, with plenty of crash-bang action."

Nell Minow of RogerEbert.com gave the film two and a half stars out of four, saying "Parents will appreciate the way the pups tackle problem-solving, working together to make the best use of each character's talents." Courtney Howard of Variety found that, "Any crass consumerism is eclipsed by disarming, demonstrable themes and meaningful sentiments woven throughout the film's textured fabric." Yolanda Machado of TheWrap gave the film a positive review, stating "Brunker and his co-writers find a way to deliver a multi-layered story that can grab toddlers while keeping older viewers entertained and not groaning at some propagandized messaging." Frank Scheck of The Hollywood Reporter called the film, "Harmless fun for its target audience".

Sarah Bea Milner of Screen Rant gave the film a negative review, saying, "PAW Patrol has enough action to keep young fans entertained, but parents will likely be bored by the dragging pace and convoluted plot." Jude Dry of IndieWire gave the film a D, and wrote in her review, "While it's doubtful the humorless dirge of a movie will make enough of an impression to mold young minds in any lasting way, the critique of PAW Patrol is useful as an amalgamation of certain favorite Hollywood themes that ought to be retired."

Writing for The A.V. Club, Jesse Hassenger criticized the film's merchandise and gave the film a C− saying, "The film version feels most energized when it's amping up to sell toys: fetishizing the clicking of plastic into plastic, and supersizing the characters' armor and vehicles with a deranged zeal matched only by real police departments around the country." Writing for Los Angeles Times, Michael Ordoña criticized the film for writing under the parents despite 'its awesomeness' for very young audiences. He stated, "To very young kids who like cartoon dogs driving shiny vehicles, "PAW Patrol: The Movie" may be awesome. To grown-ups, it may be an aggressively under-written, 88-minute toy commercial." He felt that the voice actors were "unremarkable" and criticized the script, writing, "The dialogue is fairly represented by the line: 'Where is it? There's so many buildings. I wonder which one it is.'"

=== Accolades ===
Award	Date of ceremony	Category	Nominee(s)	Result	Ref.
Directors Guild of Canada	October 23, 2021	Best Sound Editing - Feature Film	J.R. Fountain, Nelson Ferreira, Mark Dejczak, Rob Hegedus, Claudia Pinto, Jack Madigan	Nominated	
Hollywood Music in Media Awards	November 17, 2021	Original Song — Animated Film	"Good Mood" - Karl Johan Schuster, Savan Kotecha, Oscar Görres and Adam Levine	Won	
Canadian Screen Awards	April 8, 2022	Best Sound Editing	J. R. Fountain, Nelson Ferreira, Mark Dejczak, Robert Hegedus and Steve Hammond	Nominated	
Canadian Screen Awards	April 8, 2022	Best Sound Mixing	Bernard Gariépy Strobl, J. R. Fountain and Erik Culp	Nominated	
Canadian Screen Awards	April 8, 2022	Golden Screen Award	Spin Master Entertainment	Won	
Nickelodeon Kids' Choice Awards	April 9, 2022	Favorite Animated Movie	Paw Patrol: The Movie	Nominated	

== Other media ==
=== Video game ===
A video game based on the film was announced on June 10, 2021, titled Paw Patrol The Movie: Adventure City Calls. Developed by Drakhar Studio and published by Outright Games, it was released for PlayStation 4, Xbox One, Nintendo Switch, Microsoft Windows and Stadia on August 13, 2021. The game received mixed reviews. It was the third video game based on the series overall; this game is set before the events of the film where the pups including Chase, Skye, Marshall and the new city girl Liberty embarks on a mission to save Adventure City from Mayor Humdinger who becomes a mayor in a buzzing metropolis with his selfish scheming. Rocky and Zuma are playable characters, but they are not featured in the box art. While Liberty was not wearing her uniform in the box art, she does wear during the games played.

== Future ==
=== Sequels ===
In August 2021, director Cal Brunker stated that he would like to make a sequel to the film. "We've certainly thought about it. There are other stories that we would be excited about telling. But for us, it's really about seeing if people love this one, and then taking it from there."

On November 3, 2021, Spin Master officially announced that a sequel, titled Paw Patrol: The Mighty Movie was in development, with Cal Brunker confirming that he would direct the sequel, while Jennifer Dodge confirmed that she would serve as a producer along with Laura Clunie and Toni Stevens. Six months later, Taraji P. Henson joined the cast in a new role as a meteor-obsessed mad scientist named Victoria Vance.

On January 25, 2023, the film's voice cast was announced, with actors including Kristen Bell, Christian Convery, Mckenna Grace, Lil Rel Howery, James Marsden, Serena Williams, Alan Kim, Brice Gonzalez, North West, Christian Corrao (reprising his role as the voice of Marshall from the show replacing Kingsley Marshall from the first movie), and Nylan Parthipan. It was also announced that Finn Lee-Epp would replace Will Brisbin as the voice of Ryder and Luxton Handspiker would reprise his role as the voice of Rubble from Rubble & Crew replacing Keegan Hedley from the first movie, and that Marsai Martin, Kim Kardashian, Ron Pardo, and Callum Shoniker would be reprising their roles as Liberty, Delores, Mayor Humdinger, and Rocky. It was additionally announced that Pinar Toprak would compose the film's score, replacing Heitor Pereira.

The sequel was released on September 29, 2023.

On September 26, 2023, Spin Master announced that a third film is in development, scheduled to be released on July 31, 2026. On February 27, 2025, it was announced that the title of the movie is Paw Patrol: The Dino Movie. In May 2025, it was announced that the movie had been moved forward to July 24, 2026.

On October 27, 2026, it was announced that a fourth movie is in development, with plans for a theatrical release in 2029.
