= Chuang Tapestry =

1959 film

- Directed by: Qian Jiajun (钱家骏)
- Written by: Xiao Ganniu (萧甘牛)
- Distributed by: Shanghai Animation Film Studio
- Release date: 1959
- Running time: 60 mins
- Country: China
- Language: Mandarin

Chuang Tapestry (Chinese: 一幅僮锦) is a Chinese animated film produced by Shanghai Animation Film Studio. It is also referred to as "Chwang Tapestry".

== Story ==
Once upon a time the Chuang family chopped firewood for a living. Mother Tanja spent three years day and night weaving this tapestry. One day a wind storm came and the tapestry flew away. Kam Tong, one of the children, would venture off to the dangerous Tibet mountains to try to get the tapestry back. Very few have ever survived the cave.

== Creators ==
English Production	Original Version	Crew	Romanized
Screenwriter	編劇	Xiao Ganniu	萧甘牛
Director	导演	Qian Jiajun	钱家骏
Composers	作曲	Wu Ying-Ju; Miao Shuyun	吳應炬 苗淑云
Animation Design	动画设计	Wu Qiang; Yan Dingxian; Pu Jiaxiang; Lu Qing; He Yuwen; Wang Zheng Zhong; Yang Suying; Gegui Yun	邬强 严定宪 浦家祥 陆青 何郁文 王正中 杨素英 葛桂云
Background	背景	Zheng Shaoru; Lei Yu; Fang Xiaoxian; Han Bin; Yinkou Yang	郑少如 雷雨 方澎年 韩斌 尹口羊
Photography by	摄影	Wang Shirong	王世荣
Recording	錄音	Li Wei Xiu	李偉修
Singing	演唱	Shanghai Choir	上海合唱团
Played by	演奏	Shanghai Film Symphony Orchestra	上影乐团
Conducted by	指揮	Chen Chuanxi	陈传熙

== DVD ==
The film has since been republished on a DVD along with other animation movies.

== Awards ==
- The film was nominated in the Czech Republic 1960 Karlovy Vary International Film Festival
