= T.O.T.S. =

Television program

- Promotional poster
- Also known as: Tiny Ones Transport Service
- Genre: Musical; Adventure; Comedy
- Created by: Travis Braun
- Directed by: Chris Gilligan
- Voices of: Jet Jurgensmeyer; Tucker Chandler; Christian J. Simon; Vanessa Williams; Megan Hilty
- Opening theme: "Time to Fly with T.O.T.S." by Jet Jurgensmeyer, Tucker Chandler and Christian J. Simon
- Ending theme: "Time to Fly with T.O.T.S." (instrumental)
- Composers: Rob Cantor; Gregory James Jenkins; Greg Nicolett
- Country of origin: United States
- Original language: English
- No. of seasons: 3
- No. of episodes: 75 (150 segments) (list of episodes)

Production
- Executive producers: Chris Prynoski; Shannon Prynoski; Ben Kalina; Victor Cook; Travis Braun (S2–3)
- Producer: Winnie Chaffee
- Running time: 22 minutes (two 11-minute segments per half-hour)
- Production companies: Titmouse, Inc.; ICON Creative Studios

Original release
- Network: Disney Junior; Disney Channel (2019–2021)
- Release: June 14, 2019 – June 10, 2022

T.O.T.S., also known as Tiny Ones Transport Service, is an American animated children's television series created by Travis Braun. The series aired on Disney Junior from June 14, 2019 to June 10, 2022. It focuses on Pip (a penguin) and his best friend Freddy (a flamingo) who work at T.O.T.S (a transporting service nursery) and tend to baby animals by delivering them to their (the babies') parents' doors expectedly.

== Premise ==
Pip and Freddy are two delivery birds in-training at T.O.T.S. (the Tiny Ones Transport Service). T.O.T.S. is a place where baby animals are nursed before being delivered to their families.

When a baby is ready for delivery, they are placed in a crate having colored edges indicating the gender of the baby: blue (male) or pink (female). When the baby reaches their family, Pip and Freddy, as with all delivery birds, would photograph the family with their computer tablet, called a FlyPad, for confirmation.

Besides delivering babies, Pip and Freddy also learn to solve problems under the guidance of K.C. and Captain Candace Beakman, along with the other delivery storks.

== Episodes ==
Season	Episodes	Originally released	
Season	Episodes	First released	Last released
1	25	June 2019	July 10, 2020
2	25	August 7, 2020	June 18, 2021
3	25	July 9, 2021	June 10, 2022

== Characters ==
=== Main ===
- Pip (voiced by Jet Jurgensmeyer in Seasons 1–2 and Tucker Chandler in Season 3) is a young Adélie penguin who serves as Freddy's navigator and is the main protagonist of the series, along with Freddy. First mentioned in episode "Back to Cool," his birthplace is Iceberg Alley, home of Penn and his parents, and other penguins. His catchphrase is "This penguin's got a plan!". Jet Jurgensmeyer stopped voicing Pip after Season 2 due to puberty, so Tucker Chandler took his place for Season 3.
- Freddy (voiced by Christian J. Simon) an ordinary flamingo who is Pip's partner, and the one who does the flying. Freddy's also the main protagonist, along with Pip. Freddy has long wings that help him fly. His catchphrase is "Flamin-go!"
- Captain Candace Beakman (voiced by Vanessa Williams) is a pelican who is the leader of T.O.T.S. She is also the mother of Mia the Kitten. Captain Beakman has a brother in law named Sam & a younger sister named Cora.
- K.C. (voiced by Megan Hilty) is a koala who works at T.O.T.S. who tends to the babies in the nursery before they get delivered. K.C. is also a guitarist. K.C has a brother, two sisters, a grandmother, and a surrogate uncle who is a cow. K.C. affectionately refers to the babies at T.O.T.S. as "Lil' Nuggets."

=== Recurring ===
- Bodhi (voiced by Parvesh Cheena) is an insecure stork deliverer with the biggest wings at T.O.T.S. Bodhi tends to get spooked by mostly ordinary things, but is willing to help when assistance is needed.
- Ava (voiced by Melanie Minichino) is a street-talking female stork deliverer at T.O.T.S.
- J.P. (voiced by Henri Lubatti) is a prideful French-accented stork deliverer at T.O.T.S.. J.P. is one of the finest deliverers at T.O.T.S. J.P. won "Delivery Bird of the Month" ten consecutive times, thus Pip and Freddy see him as a role model. J.P. was also the company's fastest deliverer until J.P. was succeeded by Ava who in turn was succeeded by Bodhi. In the premiere episode of Season 2, "Puppy Problems", J.P. becomes a father to a dachshund puppy named Lucky who is very mischievous (but J.P. fails to notice this). In the penultimate episode of the series, "Baby Fliers", it's revealed that he delivered Pip and Freddy when they were babies.
- Paulie (voiced by Dee Bradley Baker) is a parrot who is the air traffic controller at T.O.T.S. and often speaks his sentences twice.
- Mr. Woodbird (voiced by Eric Bauza) is a red-headed woodpecker who is the janitor at T.O.T.S. He sometimes gives Pip and Freddy inventions that are solutions to their problems.
- Mia (voiced by Charlie Townsend) a kitten who is the adopted daughter of Captain Beakman. Her catchphrase is "Mia help! Mia help!" when someone wants help with something, but even she needs help. In the episode "Lend Me Your Paw," Mia looks up to Pip and Freddy as her big brothers. Mia is the first baby whose name didn't start with the same letter as her animal species.
- Peggy (voiced by Angelica Hale) is a polar bear who wanted a better baby brother than her brother Paul until Peggy heard he got stuck in a small cave in the episode "Bringing Back Baby". She reappeared in the episode "Snow Place Like Home."
- Lucky (voiced by Alessandra Perez) is a dachshund puppy that loves to act mischievous and is the adopted son of J.P. In "All Aboard Babies," Lucky's shown to love dancing and showing off his moves to other babies.
- Red, (voiced by Hadley Gannaway) Jed, (voiced by Remy Edgerly) and Zed (voiced by Julian Edwards) are the stork triplets who visit T.O.T.S. in the episode "Training Daze" and want to become junior fliers. They appear again having a hard time teaming up to deliver a baby moose in "Junior Junior Fliers."
- Cora (voiced by Yvette Nicole Brown) is a pelican who is Captain Beakman's sister and Mia's adoptive aunt.
- Sam (voiced by Kevin Michael Richardson) is Cora's husband, whom she marries in "The Ring Bear".
- Ms. Trunklebee (voiced by Kari Wahlgren) is an Asian elephant who's a teacher at the Sky School. She has a tendency to easily forget things, such as her reading glasses.
- Wyatt (voiced by Remy Edgerly) is a blue whale calf.
- Precious (voiced by Amari McCoy) is a panda cub.
- Scooter (voiced by Boone Nelson) is a baby skunk.
- Cam (voiced by Hudson Cordero) is a baby chameleon.

== Production ==
In April 2018, T.O.T.S. was greenlit by Disney Junior. It is produced by Titmouse, Inc. facilities in New York City, with animation and additional production handled by the independent Icon Creative Studio in Vancouver.

== Release ==
=== Broadcast ===
T.O.T.S. debuted on Disney Junior, Disney Channel, and DisneyNow in the United States on June 14, 2019. It premiered on Disney Junior in Canada on June 22. In February 2019, the series was renewed for a second season ahead of its broadcast premiere. On August 5, 2020, the series was renewed for a third ahead of the second-season premiere. The second season debuted on August 7, 2020. The third season was released on July 9, 2021. The television series was later made available to stream on Disney+.

The series finale aired on June 10, 2022.

=== Home media ===
Home media is distributed by Walt Disney Studios Home Entertainment.

Region	Title	Episode(s)	Release date	Length	Aspect ratio	Note(s)
1	Bringing This Baby Home	You've Gotta Be Kitten Me/Whale, Hello There; Panda Excess/A Stinky Situation; Cheetah Chase/Training Daze; Nursery Schooling/Bunny Bonanza; The Purrfect Little Helper/The Colorful Chameleon; Stripe Out/A Splashy Delivery; Night Flight/Slippery When Wet	August 13, 2019			

== Reception ==
=== Critical response ===
Alex Reif of LaughingPlace stated, "T.O.T.S. is a winner and kids will want to become deliver fliers themselves, learning to make others happy through good deeds and special deliveries." Emily Ashby of Common Sense Media gave T.O.T.S. a grade of five out of five stars, praised the presence of positive messages, stating the show promotes ingenuity and diversity, and complimented the depiction of positive role models, saying the characters demonstrate self-confidence and perseverance.

Azure Hall and Casey Suglia of Romper included T.O.T.S. in their "Great Shows Your Kids Will Love To Stream On Disney+" list, writing, "Your kids are sure to gush over the adorable animals and heartwarming stories of growing families." Kevin John Siazon of Today's Parent included T.O.T.S. in their "6 Must-Watch Disney Plus Shows And Movies Coming In July 2021" list, asserting, "Little animal lovers will love this show."

=== Accolades ===
Christian J. Simon received a nomination for Outstanding Performer in a Preschool Animated Program at the 2020 Daytime Creative Arts Emmy Awards. T.O.T.S. was nominated for Outstanding Achievement for Character Design in an Animated Television/Broadcast Production at the 2020 Annie Awards.
