= I Was a Satellite of the Sun =

1959 film directed by Yuri Merkulov

- Directed by: Viktor Morgenstern
- Screenplay by: V. Kapitanovsky; V. Shreyberg
- Produced by: V. Morgenstern
- Cinematography: O. Samutsevich; G. Lyakhovich
- Edited by: G. Fradkin
- Music by: A. Sevastyanov
- Production companies: Mosnauchfilm, Soyuzmultfilm
- Release date: 1959 (USSR)
- Running time: 67 minutes
- Country: Soviet Union
- Language: Russian

I Was a Satellite of the Sun - (Russian: Я был спутником Солнца) is a Soviet feature dramatic science-fiction film of 1959 with animation elements.

== Story ==
The story is told as an autobiography of the astronaut character Andrew, and set in the future, where space flight is common.

Scientist/Astronaut Petrovich pioneers the way to the Sun, but his spacecraft is never heard from again. Later, Andrew's laboratory investigates means of protection from deadly radiation. Andrew repeats Petrovich's journey, and risks his life to rescue an orbiting science laboratory, which holds the solution to the problem.

Altered matter near the Sun is responsible for deadly radiation.

Animated scenes explain orbital dynamics, auroras, solar radiation, and other scientific topics.

The first panel reads:

The film is dedicated to the people of Soviet science, engineers and workers who created a new planet of the solar system.

They took the solar satellite from the world of fiction

to the orbit of reality.

== Cast ==
- P. Makhotin - Andrew, a young scientist
- V. Ymelyanov - Igor Petrovich, Andrew's father
- G. Shamshurin - Sergei Ivanovich
- A. Shamshurin - Andrew as young child

In episodes

- N. Vishnevskaya
- G. Vitsin
- K. Erofeev
- P. Samarin

Uncredited

- Felix Jaworski - astronaut
- Mikhail Mayorov

== Crew ==
- Writers: V. Kapitanovsky,
  V. Shreyberg
- Producer: V. Morgenstern
- Operators: O. Samutsevich,
  G. Lyakhovich
- Music: A Sevastiyanov
- Artist: L. Chibisov
- Editor: G. Fradkin
- Director: Yu. Merkulov
- Art Director: L. Model'
- Operator: M. Lruya
- Recording: B. Pekker
- Conductor: V. Smirnov
- Production manager: B. Rodin
- Animation: Soyuzmultfilm studios
- Animation
  - V. Al'tshullev
  - L. Akimov
  - M. Galkin
  - A. Klopotoviskij
  - V. Nikitchenko
  - A. Sokolov
  - V. Sholina
  - Yu. Xolin

== Scientific consultants ==
- A. M. Kasatkin
- V. N. Komarov

== Related facts ==
- The parts of the film correspond to a 300m maximum length for 35mm film rolls standardized in the Soviet Union; the seven parts of this film amount to 1816.7 m.
