= Benoît Rousseau (actor) =

Canadian actor (1959–2026)

- Born: August 17, 1959
- Died: April 24, 2026 (aged 66); Montreal, Quebec, Canada
- Occupation: Actor

Benoît Rousseau (August 17, 1959 – April 24, 2026) was a Canadian actor. He was best known for providing the dubbed voices of Austin Powers, Dr. Evil and Mini-Me in the Quebec version of the Austin Powers films franchise.

In addition to his work in Austin Powers, he provided the dubbed Quebec voices for Nicolas Cage in The Rock, Tim Robbins in Green Lantern, Benicio del Toro in Traffic, Dwayne Johnson in Get Smart, Kevin Bacon in Telling Lies in America, Will Patton in The Client, Michael O'Neill in Transformers, James Gandolfini in Lonely Hearts and Jeffrey Dean Morgan in Red Dawn, and voiced the dubbed Quebec versions of Grampa Simpson, Mr. Burns, Troy McClure, Lenny Leonard, and Duffman in the Fox animated sitcom television series The Simpsons.

Rousseau died in Montreal, Quebec on April 24, 2026, at the age of 66.
