= Capt'n Sailorbird =

- Written by: Israel M. Berman
- Country of origin: United States
- Original language: English
- No. of episodes: 190

Production
- Producer: Saul J. Turell
- Running time: 30 minutes
- Production company: Magic Screen Pictures Inc.

Original release
- Release: 1959

Capt'n Sailorbird is an American syndicated animated television series which debuted in 1959 and aired on television in every weekday in morning hours. An anthology series of sorts, the Sailorbird character, a parrot perched on the top of a windjammer, introduced (via newly animated wraparound segments) foreign language cartoons which were reedited and dubbed into English for the series by Paul Killiam. 190 five-minute episodes were produced, which were inserted into individual stations' children's shows. Longer cartoons were serialized over the course of multiple episodes.

The series was distributed by Sterling Films.
