= Cartoon Party =

Canadian children's television series

- Genre: Children's television
- Presented by: Malcolm the Dog (John Keogh)
- Country of origin: Canada
- Original language: English
- No. of seasons: 3

Production
- Running time: 30 minutes

Original release
- Network: CBC Television
- Release: 7 November 1959 – 25 September 1962

Cartoon Party is a Canadian children's television series which aired on CBC Television from 1959 to 1962.

== Premise ==
Malcolm the Dog (a puppet operated by John Keogh) presents various cartoons.

== Scheduling ==
For the first two seasons, this half-hour series was broadcast on Saturdays at 5:30 p.m. (Eastern) from 7 November to 25 March 1961, with a break between January and April 1960. From 4 April 1961, Cartoon Party moved to a Tuesday 5:30 p.m. time slot where the series then ran during mid-years in 1961 and 1962.
