= Ray Nelson Jr. =

American cartoonist (born 1965)

Ray Nelson
- Born: Raymond Denny Nelson Jr. December 12, 1965 (age 60); Portland, Oregon, U.S.
- Education: Pacific University
- Occupations: Cartoonist, Writer
- Years active: 1983–present
- Notable work: Flying Rhino Junior High (1998-2000)
- Spouse: Theresa Nelson
- Children: 3

Raymond Denny Nelson Jr. (born December 12, 1965), is an American animator, voice actor, cartoonist and writer, best known for creating the Canadian animated series Flying Rhino Junior High. Nelson is also well known for his involvement in the books that inspired the series. He initially started out as an animator at Will Vinton Studios, but left in 1993 to form his personal animation studio, Flying Rhinoceros, which was closed in 2016. He later formed a new studio, Really Big Creative, in 2018.

== Filmography ==
Year	Title	Role	Notes
1985	Return to Oz		Claymation animator (uncredited)
1987	A Claymation Christmas Celebration		Sculptor
1988	Meet the Raisins!		Animator
1991	Claymation Comedy of Horrors		Animator
1992	Claymation Easter		Animator
1992	Brain Donors		Claymation animator
1998–2000	Flying Rhino Junior High		Creator (based on the Flying Rhinoceros books), co-executive producer, writer, director,
2004-2006	On the Farm with Farmer Bob	Sam Sheep (voice)	Creator (based on the Farmer Bob books), writer, director, executive producer
2005-2006	Horned Avenger	Bartholomew Lyle Tiddlywink (voice)	Creator (based on The Battle Against Boredom: How to Draw Cartoons), writer, director, character design (first episode only), voice actor
2006	Get Muggsy!	Muggsy, Trapper #2 (voice)	Writer, creative director, character design, voice actor
2006	Sly Fox and Birdie	Sly Fox (voice)	Writer, creative director, character design, voice actor
2006–2010	Gigi: God's Little Princess		Writer, executive producer, director

=== Internet ===
Year	Title	Role	Notes
1998-2016	BoomToons	Earl P. Sidebottom/The Phantom, Bartholomew Lyle Tiddlywink, Narrator (voice)	Writer, creative director, character design, co-executive producer, voice actor
2011-2016	Kartoon Kow	Kartoon Kow (voice)	Voice actor

== Books ==
=== Written and illustrated ===
- The Incredible Adventures of Donovan Willoughby (1990)
- Flying Rhinoceros books (1993-2000)
- Farmer Bob books (1999-2006)
- Fraboomerang books (1998-2008)
- The Battle Against Boredom: How to Draw Cartoons (1996, reprinted in 2005 by Thomas Nelson),
