= Susan Shadburne =

American screenwriter (1942–2018)

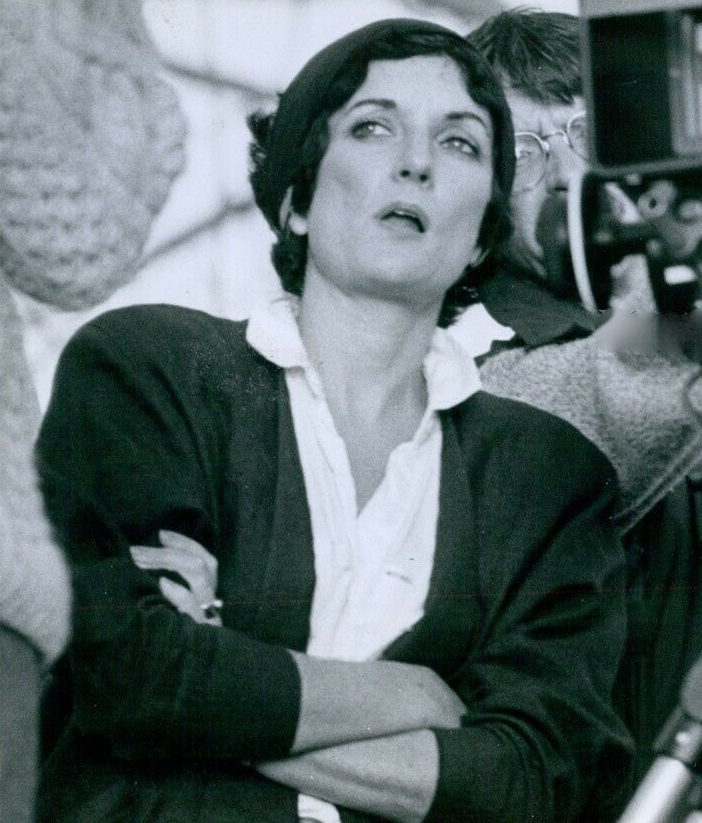
- Shadburne in 1985
- Born: December 16, 1942; Portland, Oregon, U.S.
- Died: April 24, 2018 (aged 75); Vancouver, Washington, U.S.
- Education: Stanford University
- Occupations: Filmmaker; director; screenwriter
- Years active: 1978–1994
- Spouse: Will Vinton (divorced)
- Children: 3

Susan Carol Shadburne (December 16, 1942 – April 24, 2018) was an American screenwriter, director, producer, and filmmaker, best known for her collaborations with her husband, claymation animator Will Vinton. She wrote the screenplay for The Adventures of Mark Twain (1985), directed by Vinton, and wrote and directed the supernatural thriller film Shadow Play (1986). In addition to feature films, Shadburne wrote and directed several short films. Two of the short films Shadburne wrote that Vinton directed—Rip Van Winkle (1978) and The Great Cognito (1983) –were nominated for the Academy Award for Best Animated Short Film.

== Biography ==
Shadburne was born and raised in Portland, Oregon, and graduated from Lincoln High School in 1960. She later attended Stanford University.

Shadburne began writing films in 1978 while married to animator Will Vinton, first a documentary short about Vinton's filmmaking process titled Claymation: Three Dimensional Clay Animation. She subsequently wrote the screenplay for Vinton's short film Rip Van Winkle (1978), which was nominated for the Academy Award for Best Animated Short Film. In 1982, she again wrote the screenplay for Vinton's short The Great Cognito, which was again nominated for the Academy Award for Best Animated Short Film.

She collaborated with Vinton on the 1985 animated feature The Adventures of Mark Twain. Shadburne researched Mark Twain extensively while writing the screenplay, adapting it from his autobiography and integrating direct quotes from him into the dialogue. The following year, she wrote, produced, and directed the supernatural thriller film Shadow Play (1986) starring Dee Wallace and Cloris Leachman.

In her later life, Shadburne worked as a medical intuitive and energy healer.

== Death ==
Shadburne died on April 24, 2018, in Vancouver, Washington, aged 75, after a decades-long battle with multiple sclerosis.

== Filmography ==
Year	Film	Director	Writer	Producer	Notes	Ref.
1978	Claymation: Three Dimensional Clay Animation	No	Yes	No	Documentary short	
1978	Rip Van Winkle	No	Yes	No		
1979	The Little Prince	No	Yes	No	Short film	
1979	Legacy: A Very Short History of Natural Resources	No	Yes	No	Short film	
1979	The Legend of Black Thunder Mountain	No	Yes	No		
1980	Dinosaur	No	Yes	No	Short film	
1980	The Diary of Adam and Eve	No	Yes	No	Short film	
1981	A Family Affair	Yes	Yes	No	Short film	
1982	The Great Cognito	No	Yes	No	Short film	
1985	The Adventures of Mark Twain	No	Yes	No		
1986	Shadow Play	Yes	Yes	Yes		
1987	King Cole's Party	Yes	Yes	Yes		
1987	Turn Around	Yes	Yes	No	Documentary film	
1988	Grandpa's Magical Toys	Yes	Yes	Yes		
1990	The Ultimate Challenge	No	Yes	No	Short film	
1992	We Are Family	Yes	Yes	No	Short film	
1994	Making a Difference	Yes	Yes	No	Short film	

== Accolades ==
Institution	Year	Category	Recipient	Result	Ref.
Academy Awards	1978	Best Animated Short Film	Rip Van Winkle	Nominated	
Academy Awards	1983	Best Animated Short Film	The Great Cognito	Nominated	

== Sources ==
- Atkinson, Doug; Zippan, Fiona (1995). Videos for Kids: The Essential, Indispensable Parent's Guide to Children's Movies on Video. Rocklin, California: Prima Pub. ISBN 978-1-559-58635-1.
- Beck, Jerry (2005). The Animated Movie Guide. Chicago, Illinois: Chicago Review Press. ISBN 978-1-569-76222-6.
- Pitts, Michael R. (2012). Western Movies: A Guide to 5,105 Feature Film (2nd ed.). Jefferson, North Carolina: McFarland. p. 188. ISBN 978-0-786-46372-5.
- Weldon, Michael (1996). The Psychotronic Video Guide To Film. New York City, New York: Macmillan. ISBN 978-0-312-13149-4.
