= The California Raisin Show =

American animated television series

- Genre: animation, family
- Created by: Barry Bruce, Mark Gustafson (original concept)
- Based on: The California Raisins
- Written by: Rowby Goren; Larry DiTillio
- Directed by: Kent Butterworth; Vincent Davis; Walt Kubiak; Ron Myrick
- Creative director: Gary Selvaggio
- Voices of: Dorian Harewood; Brian Cummings; Jim Cummings; Cam Clarke; Brian Stokes Mitchell
- Composers: Dennis C. Brown; Chuck Lorre
- Country of origin: United States
- Original language: English
- No. of seasons: 1
- No. of episodes: 13

Production
- Executive producer: Will Vinton
- Producer: Walt Kubiak
- Editors: Tom Cornwell, Rick Hinson
- Production companies: Fred Wolf Films; Will Vinton Productions

Original release
- Network: CBS
- Release: September 16 – December 9, 1989

The California Raisin Show is a 1989 American animated television series based on the claymation advertising characters The California Raisins. The show is based on the claymation special, Meet the Raisins!, which originally aired on CBS in 1988. After the show's 13-episode run, a sequel to the original special, Raisins: Sold Out!: The California Raisins II, aired in 1990.

While the characters are traditionally depicted in claymation, the TV show was cel animated by Murakami-Wolf-Swenson. It did, however, maintain Will Vinton as creative director and executive producer.

== Plot ==
The series takes place in a world populated by anthropomorphic fruits and vegetables. It focuses on the main characters, a music band called the California Raisins: A.C. (vocals), Beebop (drums), Stretch (bass), and Red (guitar/piano). Each episode has one or more musical numbers, all of which were originally performed by most Motown artists.

== Cast ==
- Cam Clarke as Beebop Arborman
- Brian Cummings as Lick Broccoli
- James Jonah Cummings as A.C. Arborman, and Leonard Limabean
- Brian Mitchell as Red Raisin
- Dorian Harewood as Stretch Thompson, and Red ("No Business Like Shoe Business")
- Gaille Heidemann as Shirelle
- Michele Mariana as Lulu Arborman (Mom)
- Rebecca Gilchrist as Dixie
- Willard E. Pugh
- Cree Summer as Crystal
- Todd Tolces as Rudy Bagaman

== Episodes ==
No.	Title	Written by	Original release date
1	"The Apple, Raisin-Style"	Larry DiTillio	September 16, 1989
The band heads to New York City to find Mom just in time for a gig. Songs: "I Heard It Through the Grapevine", "The Way You Do the Things You Do", "Dancing in the Street"
2	"No Business Like Shoe Business"	Rowby Goren	September 23, 1989
Red is given shoes with a mind of their own. Songs: "Beechwood 4-5789", "Get Ready", "Do You Love Me"
3	"School is Cool"	Larry DiTillio	September 30, 1989
Stretch has to go to high school again, so the others join him. Songs: "Shake Me, Wake Me (When It's Over)", "ABC", "You Got What It Takes"
4	"A Royal Mess"	Rowby Goren	October 7, 1989
The raisins fly to a castle, where they perform for a king. Songs: "Shop Around", "Just My Imagination (Running Away with Me)", "Save the Last Dance for Me"
5	"Lights, Camera, Disaster"	Rowby Goren	October 14, 1989
The band is asked to act for the first time in a big Hollywood feature. Song: "Stop! In the Name of Love"
6	"The Good, the Bad & the Broccoli"	Larry DiTillio	October 21, 1989
The band has their first encounter with Lick Broccoli and his band of vegetables. Songs: "Ain't That Peculiar", "Baby Love"
7	"Abracadabra Beebop"	Rowby Goren	October 28, 1989
Beebop desires to leave the band and become a full-time magician. Songs: "I Like It Like That", "I Can't Get Next to You", "Do You Believe in Magic"
8	"The Grape Outdoors"	Larry DiTillio	November 4, 1989
The raisins go on a camping trip. Songs: "You're All I Need to Get By", "The Wanderer" "Oh How Happy"
9	"Rocket n' Rollin' Raisins"	Rowby Goren	November 11, 1989
The band plays at a futuristic club, only to discover they're being launched into outer space! Songs: "You Keep Me Hangin' On", "Mashed Potato Time", "Going to a Go-Go"
10	"Hold That Jungle"	Rowby Goren	November 18, 1989
The band heads to the jungles of Africa for a wild expedition. Songs: "Nowhere to Run", "Quicksand", "Ain't No Mountain High Enough"
11	"Olivera Street"	Larry DiTillio	November 25, 1989
The raisins are given a star on the sidewalk of the world-famous "Olivera Street." Songs: "Sir Duke", "I'll Be Doggone", "Let's Get Serious"
12	"Picture-Perfect Shirelle"	Rowby Goren	December 2, 1989
Shirelle becomes a model and wants to split with her band-mates. Songs: "Ain't Nothing Like the Real Thing", "My Cherie Amour", "I Second That Emotion"
13	"You Can't Grow Home Again"	Larry DiTillio	December 9, 1989
A.C, Beebop, and Mom head home for a family reunion. Songs: "(I'm a) Road Runner", "This Old Heart of Mine (Is Weak for You)", "I Just Want to Celebrate"

== Home media ==
On November 15, 2011, Hen's Tooth Video released The California Raisins Collection on DVD in Region 1 for the first time. The 2-disc set features all 13 episodes of the series as well as the two original claymation specials, Meet the Raisins! and The Raisins: Sold Out!: The California Raisins II, along with 4 original TV ads.
