= The California Raisins: The Grape Escape =

- Planned box art
- Developers: Radiance; Interactive Designs
- Publisher: Capcom
- Producer: Christopher Riggs
- Designer: Christopher Riggs
- Programmer: Robert Morgan
- Artist: Nancy Nakamoto
- Composer: Scott Etherton
- Platform: Nintendo Entertainment System
- Release: NA: Canceled
- Genres: Action, Platform
- Mode: Single-player

The California Raisins: The Grape Escape is a California Raisins video game developed by Radiance for the Nintendo Entertainment System. Capcom planned to publish the game in 1990, but its release was canceled.

== Gameplay ==
In-game screenshot

In the single player side-scrolling action game, the player controls a California Raisin through five stages in an effort to rescue the band and their musical notes that were stolen by a gang of musicians. The player can walk, jump, climb on vines and shoot an unlimited supply of grape jelly beans as projectiles. During each level, the player can collect 'I' icons that provide temporary invincibility, regular black musical notes for bonus points, 'Sunshine' icons to restore health, and 'Raisinette' icons for an extra life. The player can also locate items by shooting at the thin air or at columns.

As was the case with other Capcom games, such as Mega Man and DuckTales, the player can choose from any of the first four levels. The final level is only available after collecting the musical notes from each of the four levels. The first four levels include The Grape Vine, The Factory, The Maize Maze and The Juicery. The final level takes place in The Clouds.

== Secondary market ==
The beta cartridge for the game was sold for approximately $1,000.
