= The California Raisins =

Anthropomorphic animated musical group

- First appearance: June 19, 1986
- Last appearance: July 31, 1994
- Created by: California Raisin Advisory Board, Foote, Cone & Belding

In-universe information
- Alias: The Singin' Dancin' California Raisins
- Nickname: The Vine-Yls (Meet the Raisins!)
- Nationality: American

The California Raisins are a fictional rhythm and blues animated musical group as well as advertising and merchandising characters composed of anthropomorphized raisins. Lead vocals were sung by musician Buddy Miles. The California Raisins were popular from 1986 to 1994 through claymation TV commercials and animated specials, winning an Emmy Award and one nomination.

== History ==
The concept was created by advertising firm Foote, Cone & Belding (FCB) for a 1986 Sun-Maid commercial on behalf of the California Raisin Advisory Board when one of the writers, Seth Werner (at the time with FCB in San Francisco) came up with an idea for the new raisin commercial, saying, "We have tried everything but dancing raisins singing 'I Heard It Through the Grapevine'" (the 1968 song popularized separately by Marvin Gaye, Gladys Knight and the Pips and Creedence Clearwater Revival).

The California Raisin Industry says developing and testing the first animated 30-second commercial cost $300,000. To their surprise, the commercial became wildly popular, paving the way for several future commercials and opportunities through other media. The commercials were produced by Vinton Studios using their claymation technique, with character designs by Michael Brunsfeld. The following year, the Raisins appeared in the Emmy Award-winning A Claymation Christmas Celebration, singing the Christmas carol "Rudolph the Red-Nosed Reindeer".

The California Raisins released four studio albums in 1987 and 1988, and their signature song, "I Heard It Through the Grapevine", landed on the Billboard Hot 100 and peaked at number 84. For three of the four albums the group issued, they were a consistent vocal group, with Buddy Miles handling most of the lead vocals; Ellis Hall and Niki Haris sang occasional leads, and backing vocals were by Howard McCrary, Howard Smith, and Leslie Smith. (One album, Meet The Raisins!, featured completely different vocal performers, and was issued on a different label and overseen by a different production and musical team. It also did not feature the California Raisins name on the front cover, spine or record label -- just the legend "Meet The Raisins!")

Despite the albums and chart appearance, the Raisins would continue to make their strongest impression through animated endeavors, and the characters proved popular enough that they were used to endorse Post Raisin Bran cereal.

On November 4, 1988, CBS aired a primetime television special called Meet the Raisins! The musical mockumentary was again created by Vinton Studios, and was nominated for a Primetime Emmy Award. It also gave the band members individual names and roles: A.C. (vocals), Beebop (drums), Stretch (bass), and Red (guitar/piano).

A Saturday morning cartoon series, The California Raisin Show, debuted the following year, but lasted only 13 episodes. While cel animated by Murakami-Wolf-Swenson, it maintained Will Vinton's creative direction. A sequel to the original CBS special aired in 1990 under the title The Raisins: Sold Out! - The California Raisins II. This special saw the Raisins hiring a new manager with the goal of making a comeback before The California Raisins 2000.

The Raisins were initially discontinued July 31, 1994, with the collapse of the California Raisin Advisory Board; members of the grape farming industry were growing alarmed at the increased fees, driven by an ever-escalating amount of money being spent on the California Raisins campaign. The structure of the campaign had resulted in all of the profits from the campaign being funneled back to Foote, Cone & Belding for more commercials and merchandise, creating a vicious cycle. Following the closure, the Raisins trademarks and copyrights became property of the state of California, who beginning in 1998 licensed them to a newly formed successor organization, the California Raisin Marketing Board.

== Merchandise ==
Many of the items created for the campaign have become part of the permanent collection of the Smithsonian Institution. Merchandise sales included toys and Raisins images on nearly every conceivable medium: lunch boxes, notebooks, clothing, posters, bedsheets, and even a Halloween costume, just to name a few. A California Raisins Fan Club began in 1987, which included a Grapevine Gazette newsletter and various memorabilia. Blackthorne Publishing also released a six-issue comic book series entitled The California Raisins 3-D which included 3D glasses; these would later be re-released in the Ultimate Collection trade paperback.

Several California Raisins music albums were also released, featuring classic Motown and rock standards. These albums were included in the Smithsonian collection and were illustrated and art-directed by Helane Freeman, who later became famous for her work on Hannah Montana and The Suite Life of Zack & Cody, among other Disney programs.

Perhaps the most memorable piece of California Raisins merchandise, however, came in the form of small, non-poseable California Raisins figures. The Hardee's restaurant chain offered these as part of a promotion for its Cinnamon 'N' Raisin biscuits. Different collections were produced in 1987, 1988, 1991, and finally in 2001 (the latter adding Carl's Jr. due to their late '90s acquisition of Hardee's) for their new stylization. This latest incarnation can still be seen on the California Raisin Marketing Board website.

In the early 1990s, Capcom produced a video game for the Nintendo Entertainment System (NES) titled The California Raisins: The Grape Escape, in which the player controlled a California Raisin through five side-scrolling levels battling various evil fruit and vegetable characters that have stolen the Raisins' music. The game was completed and several video game critics reviewed it, but it was never released on the open market.

Box Office Software produced a different, unrelated California Raisins computer game in 1988 for the Apple II, Commodore 64, and PC compatibles. The plot of the game involved Tiny Goodbite having to rescue his friends who have been kidnapped and held in a cereal factory.

== Post-popularity and legacy ==
On March 28, 1997, Entertainment Weekly published "The 50 Best Commercials of All Time" as its cover story. The article ranked The California Raisins' premiere advertisement, "Lunchbox", at #15 with comments by ad agency executive Claude Jacques and described the Raisins as "The coolest wrinkled musicians this side of the Stones."

The vast amount of California Raisins merchandise has made for a substantial collectors' market. It even led to an unauthorized collectibles guide published in 1998, cataloging the many items based on the clay characters.

In 2002, the Food Network program Unwrapped featured a segment on The California Raisins featuring interviews with Will Vinton, David Altschul, and Mark Gustafson of Vinton Studios. Concept illustrations of the Raisins were also featured as interviewees discussed the characters' creation.

An article published by AnimateClay.com in the late 2000s details the whereabouts of the original claymation sculptures used by Vinton Studios. The figures were kept in a box for several years and headed for the trash before being obtained by Webster Colcord, a former employee of Vinton. Several photos were taken providing a close look at the Raisins' internal armatures and detailing their extremely poor condition, including the absence of the A.C. puppet's head.

In 2015, it was announced that a live-action/CGI reboot of the California Raisins would be produced, with president of The Actors Hall of Fame Foundation, Rusty Citron, as one of the people behind the project. As of 2025, nothing ever came of the concept, and was most likely canceled.

== Discography ==
=== Albums ===
- The California Raisins (also known as The California Raisins Sing the Hit Songs) – 1987, Warner Bros. Records, Priority Records, and BMG (US #60)
- Sweet, Delicious, & Marvelous – 1988, Warner Bros. Records, Priority Records, and BMG
- Meet the Raisins! – 1988, Atlantic Records
- Christmas with The California Raisins – 1988, Warner Bros. Records, Priority Records, and BMG

=== Singles ===
- "What Does It Take (To Win Your Love)" b/w "I Got You (I Feel Good)" – 1988, Purple Vinyl 7"
- "I Heard It Through the Grapevine" – 1988 (single, Billboard Hot 100 #84)

== Awards and nominations ==
- A Claymation Christmas Celebration – Primetime Emmy
- Meet the Raisins! – Primetime Emmy nominee
