= Helane Freeman =

American art director and artist

- Born: September 25, 1964 (age 60); Los Angeles
- Occupation: Artist

Helane Freeman (born September 25, 1964 in Los Angeles, California) is an American art director and artist, best known for the cover of the album Straight Outta Compton. Freeman is also credited on the albums Livin' Like Hustlers and The California Raisins. She has worked in film and television on such productions as Hannah Montana, The Suite Life of Zack and Cody, Cory in the House, The Closer and The Perfect Game.

Freeman attended Westlake High School and ArtCenter College of Design in Pasadena, California.

As of 2014, Freeman was living in Agoura Hills, California.

She has published a book, A Drawing A Day (2015). Freeman was awarded a Hollywood Reporter Key Art Award.
