= Flying Rhino Junior High =

Animated TV series

- Genre: Animated series
- Created by: Ray Nelson Jr.
- Based on: The books by Ray Nelson Jr.
- Directed by: Julian Harris
- Voices of: Ashley Brown; Tracey Moore; Terri Hawkes; Tracy Ryan; Richard Binsley; Ron Rubin; Paul Haddad; Len Carlson; Lindsay Leese; Catherine Gallant; Edward Glen
- Theme music composer: Pure West
- Opening theme: "Anything is Possible at Flying Rhino Junior High"
- Ending theme: "Anything is Possible at Flying Rhino Junior High" (instrumental)
- Composer: Pure West
- Countries of origin: Canada; France
- No. of seasons: 2
- No. of episodes: 26

Production
- Executive producers: Michael Hirsh; Patrick Loubert; Clive Smith
- Running time: 22 minutes
- Production companies: Nelvana Limited; Neurones France s.a.r.l.

Original release
- Network: CBS (CBS Kidshow) (United States); TF1 (TF!)/Teletoon (France); Teletoon (Canada); ITV (CITV) (United Kingdom, Season 1)
- Release: 3 October 1998 – 22 January 2000

Flying Rhino Junior High is a fantasy animated television series co-produced by Nelvana Limited and Neurones France in association with CBS Television, Scottish Television Enterprises (Season 1) and Télétoon (TPS Jeunesse). The show was originally aired from 3 October 1998 until 22 January 2000 on Teletoon in Canada. In the United States, the show aired on CBS (part of the CBS Kidshow block). On 2 February 2000, the show was cancelled.

== Premise ==
The first episode of Flying Rhino Junior High, "Prehysterical".

The show revolves around four children: Billy O'Toole, Marcus Snarkis, Ruby Snarkis, and Lydia Lopez. The show's main antagonists are Earl P. Sidebottom (also known as The Phantom) and his rat sidekick, Ratticus. Earl is a boy genius who, sometime before the show's start, got a "D" grade in shop class and retreated to the school's sub-basement boiler room in shame. There, he built a supercomputer capable of altering reality, which he uses to cause chaos in the school as revenge, leaving the main group to stop him.

== Characters ==
- Billy O'Toole (voiced by Ashley Brown) is an Irish-Canadian boy and the main protagonist of the show. He wears a red baseball cap with a "B" on it because he plays baseball. He dislikes taking baths because he thinks they are boring without his imagination.
- Marcus Snarkis (voiced by Tracey Moore) is an African-Canadian boy who is Billy's best friend and classmate. Marcus has a great knowledge of computers and carries around a mini-computer called a Megamind which helps him solve problems. He is Ruby's younger brother.
- Ruby Snarkis (voiced by Tracy Ryan) is Marcus's older sister. She is sometimes hot-headed, but still cares for her friends and Marcus. Her goal in life is to become an actress.
- Lydia Lopez (voiced by Terri Hawkes) is a Latin-Canadian girl and one of Billy's classmates. She is a redhead who wears braces. She is considered the smartest girl in her class, even by Earl's standards. Lydia is one of the brains of the main group, as her knowledge helps them escape Earl's traps.
- The Phantom/Earl P. Sidebottom (voiced by Richard Binsley) is a boy genius who, in his past, got a bad grade in shop class and went to the boiler-room in shame. He builds a giant supercomputer which alters reality to get revenge. Most of Earl's schemes backfire mainly thanks to the kids and end with the computer being destroyed.
- Raticus (voiced by Ron Rubin) is the Phantom's pet rat and servant. Raticus is not very bright and is often treated badly by Earl due to his lack of intelligence.
- Fred Spurtz (voiced by Edward Glen) is the school pig. He likes eating bugs and fish. He is friends with the main group of characters, and occasionally helps them out with their adventures.
- Mrs. Snodgrass (voiced by Lindsay Leese) is the children's teacher. She is very caring about the students in her class and always makes sure they follow her rules.
- Buzz Mulligan (voiced by Len Carlson) is an anthropomorphic rhinoceros, former pilot, and the principal of Flying Rhino Junior High.
- Buford (voiced by Paul Haddad) is an anthropomorphic pig and the janitor of Flying Rhino Junior High.
- Johnny Descunk (voiced by Edward Glen) is a bully and a troubled classmate of the main group who sometimes gets sent to detention, and hangs out with the other kids.
- Rod Hargrove (voiced by Ron Rubin) is Johnny's best friend.
- Nurse Cutlip (voiced by Catherine Gallant in the first season, Julie Lemieux in the second season) is Flying Rhino Junior High's school nurse.
- Mr. Needlenose (voiced by Paul Haddad) is a drama teacher and former shop teacher who gave Earl his failing grade.

== Episodes ==
=== Season 1 (1998) ===
No. overall	No. in season	Title	Written by	Original CBS air date
1	1	"Prehysterical"	J.D. Smith	3 October 1998
Earl transforms the school into a prehistoric jungle with dinosaurs after "answering" questions to Mrs. Snodgrass's dinosaur edition of Jeopardy!. Billy, Lydia, Marcus and Ruby must wipe out the dinosaurs while dodging them.
2	2	"Phantu's Curse"	Story by : David Finley; Teleplay by : Erika Strobel	10 October 1998
After last night's film of Pharaoh Phinster, Mrs. Snodgrass teaches Egyptian history in class, but Earl transforms the school into a pyramid. Billy, Lydia, Ruby and Marcus must get out of the pyramid before it seals itself, but Lydia takes the golden scarab and unleashes the mummy's curse.
3	3	"Underwaterworld"	David Finley	17 October 1998
During a lesson on undersea environment, Mrs. Snodgrass gives everyone a fish to place in an aquarium tank, when Earl transforms the school into an ocean environment. To reach the drainage pipes to drain the water Billy, Lydia, Ruby and Marcus use a high pressure cooking tank for a sub.
4	4	"Solar Flexus"	Story by : Kathy Slevin; Teleplay by : Brent Piaskoski	24 October 1998
Mrs. Snodgrass is teaching astronomy today. As Marcus and Billy present their science project in class, Earl brings out his project and transforms the school into the Solar System. Marcus observes that the planets are orbiting all wrong which would result in the Earth going into the Sun. Marcus, Billy, Ruby and Lydia travel in their space shuttle to correctly position the planets.
5	5	"Frankensidebottom"	Story by : J.D. Smith; Teleplay by : Kenn Scott & John Pellatt	31 October 1998
Mrs. Snodgrass teaches Mary Shelley's Frankenstein in class, when Lydia comes in late wearing a large pair of braces. Earl sends Ratticus to procure ingredients for his own incarnation of the Frankenstein's monster, but gets a wad of bubblegum instead of a brain. Earl activates and sends the creature (called Milton by Ratticus) and transforms the school into a town out of a horror Movie. While everyone runs away, Lydia who is mocked for her braces befriends Milton.
6	6	"Comic Book Chaos"	Story by : David Finley; Teleplay by : Joseph Mallozzi	7 November 1998
Mrs. Snodgrass is teaching about famous historical villains (excluding comic book ones), but Earl unleashses four comic book villains called Gravity Girl, Wedgie Woman, Magnet Maestro and the Living Vapour. Lydia leads the others to beat them taking advantage of their weak spots. After disposing of three of the villains, they become superheroes to face the newest comic book villain Gravity Girl.
7	7	"A Star Is Boring"	David Finley	14 November 1998
Ruby stars as the lead female role in the school musical, becoming standoffish in front of her friends. Earl multiplies Ruby into hundreds of self multiplying clones, causing chaos throughout the school and scaring the original Ruby. Billy, Marcus and Lydia go to the Janitor to find the real Ruby and erase the clones before everyone in the school "drowns in Rubies".
8	8	"Inverted and Unglued"	Story by : David Finley; Teleplay by : Brent Piaskoski	21 November 1998
Marcus shows a complete collection of America's stamps to a friend of his called Larry. Marcus has a rare stamp called Jenny Inverted worth a million Canadian dollars that arouses greed amongst the class. To complete his own stamp collection, Earl sends Ratticus disguised as Larry to swipe the stamp, but Ratticus loses it. Earl transforms the school into a Victorian era stamp factory to get all the Jenny Inverteds the day they were manufactured.
9	9	"The Game"	Story by : J.D. Smith; Teleplay by : Ian Corlett	28 November 1998
Marcus is intent on finishing designing his video game "Wolf Castle 3D" (based on Wolfenstein 3D) but loses his computer to Billy. Earl remembers how he lost his video game Pongo Bongo to the Confiscated Items Room and transforms the school into "Wolf Castle 3D". Billy and Marcus must survive through the castle and its passages, enemies and traps if they want to undo Earl's doings.
10	10	"Quit Buggin' Me"	Story by : Erika Strobel; Teleplay by : Gary Wheeler	5 December 1998
Everyone has brought an arthropod into class, but Ruby who hates bugs brought what she thought was an inanimate crystallis. Earl remembers a hornet called Hornicus he once had as a good friend but had to cryogenically freeze him after he stung a bully and got squashed. Earl magnifies every bug in the school to a giant size. After that Earl revives, magnifies and unleashes Hornicus. Billy, Lydia and Marcus attempt to stop the bugs while Ruby tries to overcome her fear for bugs.
11	11	"Phantom Christmas"	David Finley	12 December 1998
The Christmas holidays have begun. Earl is hating every bit of Christmas and refusing Ratticus' very kind offers until finally he leaves unhappy. The next morning Earl finds Ratticus as the Phantom. To punish him for rejecting Christmas, Ratticus sends Earl into the school where he suffers humiliation and eventually all the past chaos and terrors he once created until he gets eaten by a big fish. He wakes up from this nightmare with Christmas spirit in him, but his evil ways continue.
12	12	"Weather Waterloo"	Joseph Mallozzi	19 December 1998
Everyone in class has a project related to weather effects, especially Billy with his Weather Nullifier, which is mail order. When Earl's Atmospheric Generator is rejected from the class, he activates it and sends a twister, a mudslide and a nimbostratus cloud to storm the school. The Weather Nullifier doesn't work and totals, so Billy, Lydia, Ruby and Marcus attempt to nullify the bad weather themselves.
13	13	"Pal 9000"	David Finley	26 December 1998
Marcus has created his very own artificial intelligent friend on his Mini Mega Mind called Pal 9000, for the main purpose of running a futuristic school. Envious Earl turns the school into the very one Marcus designed for Pal and proceeds to implant a virus in Pal when his guard is down, which turns Pal against his creator and former friends. Marcus and Billy head to the Main Computer System to restore Pal and get into Earl's mainframe.

=== Season 2 (1999–2000) ===
No. overall	No. in season	Title	Written by	Original CBS air date
14	1	"Live and Let Spy"	Joseph Mallozzi	2 October 1999
The class is learning forms of writing today. Lydia guards her secret journal closely, making the others mimic her privacy. Earl has a hunch they could be writing and gossiping about him. Earl sends spies to swipe the journals and transforms the school into a downtown. Billy, Ruby, Marcus and Lydia try hard to protect their journals and their contents with help from Buford as "009 and a half."
15	2	"Wag the Rat"	Joseph Mallozzi	9 October 1999
Ruby and Billy are both candidates for election as class president. Earl decides to intervene in order to make up for his lost election and close down the school, by having Ratticus with a student identity named Hubert, which gets him a popular state. Meanwhile Ruby and Billy's competition for an election become fierce.
16	3	"It's Greek to Me"	Story by : Joseph Mallozzi; Teleplay by : Michael Leo Donovan	16 October 1999
After a Greek history lesson, the class head to the gym to practice for sports events, when Earl transforms the school into a Greek Era Olympics Theatre. Zeus and the other gods give them a challenge for glory against eternal slavery. The students are untrained in the Olympic events, so they challenge the gods to their own events. Before their glory can be granted, Marcus must beat Achilles in an obstacle course.
17	4	"Yo Ho Ho and the Phantom's a Bum"	Story by : Joseph Mallozzi; Teleplay by : John Mein	23 October 1999
Today, Mrs. Snodgrass is teaching the class about pirates. Johnny and Rod decide to commit piracy. Earl transforms the school into a galleon in the ocean. Lydia, Ruby, Billy, Marcus, Johnny and Rod are put to work by the pirates, whilst trying to come up with a plan.
18	5	"Junior High Noon"	Paul Mullie	30 October 1999
Lydia is made a prefect. As Earl turns the school into a Wild West town, Lydia becomes a sheriff and a mega control freak, jailing people (even her friends) for every offense taken. When the Harwood Gang advances, she releases everyone and gets help from her friends.
19	6	"Out of Time"	Paul Mullie	6 November 1999
Earl completes his time machine to send Lydia, Marcus, Ruby and Billy to the prehistoric times. Instead he manages to send them back 20 years in the school, when Earl was a student. With his help they manage to get back to the present day.
20	7	"Career Day"	Story by : Joseph Mallozzi; Teleplay by : Gary Wheeler	20 November 1999
Today, is career day at Flying Rhino. Insulted by Ruby's flippant remarks, Earl turns the school into a sewer complex. After braving the sewers of its dangers, Lydia, Ruby, Marcus and Billy engineer a dam to turn Earl's flooding against him.
21	8	"Daredevil O'Toole and the Amazon Adventure"	Joseph Mallozzi	27 November 1999
Before Earl can transform the school, he gets trapped in the school's ground floor and takes the guise as a girl called Ursula. Ratticus turns the school into an Amazon jungle with Earl in it with apparent way out.
22	9	"Raging Rubbish"	Shelley Hoffman and Rob Pincombe	4 December 1999
Today, the school is learning about environmental preservation. Earl creates a monster out of a mound of garbage called Garbacus. Lydia, Billy, Ruby and Marcus take steps to biodegrade and melt Garbacus before they finish him off in the Recycletron 2000.
23	10	"Better Safe than Silly"	Story by : Joseph Mallozzi; Teleplay by : John Mein	11 December 1999
Today, Firefighter Chief Don Sizzlestopper comes for a safety inspection around the school. Hoping the inspection will fail, Earl turns the school into a broken and unsafe place getting Sizzlestopper caught in unknown accidents. In addition Earl begins to set the school on fire.
24	11	"Phantomatic Voyage"	Joseph Mallozzi	18 December 1999
Today, Mrs. Snodgnass teaches about body works, and Nurse Cutlip informs Ruby about healthy diets to protect the immune system. Earl transports the school inside his body. First Ruby, Billy, Marcus and Lydia take care of Earl's unhealthy body before they change his mind in his brain.
25	12	"All Green Thumbs"	John Mein	15 January 2000
Today, the class is learning about plants and agriculture. Earl sends Ratticus to deliver an instantaneous plant-mutating fertiliser, which causes the plants to grow fast and gigantic and spread like weeds. Marcus, Lydia, Ruby and Billy attempt to cut off the plants' light and water supply.
26	13	"Seeing Double"	Joseph Mallozzi	22 January 2000
Today, everyone's into the subject of appearances, while Johnny is in trouble for a sink breakage Marcus accidentally caused. Tired of his failures, Earl sends Billy, Marcus, Lydia and Ruby to a parallel universe. The four attempt to avoid Buford's counterpart and seek parallel Earl's help, whilst their parallel selves cause riots back in the first universe.

== Telecast and home media ==
The show was originally aired on Teletoon in Canada from 3 October 1998 until the final episode aired on 22 January 2000. Repeats were formerly aired on YTV in the 2000s until the early 2010s. Internationally, the show is aired on CBS (part of the "CBS Kidshow" block) in the U.S., Cartoon Network in the Netherlands and UK, CITV in the United Kingdom, TF1 in France, Super RTL in Germany, Nickelodeon and HBO Family in the Latin America, Top Kids in Poland, Rai 3 in Italy, and ABC 5 in Philippines. In 1999, Alliance Atlantis released a VHS compilation titled "From the Files of Flying Rhino Junior High", containing the episodes "Underwaterworld", "The Game", and "Comic Book Chaos".
