= Claymation Comedy of Horrors =

1991 short film by Will Vinton

- Screenplay by: Barry Bruce; Mark Gustafson; Ryan Holznagel
- Directed by: Barry Bruce
- Starring: Brian Cummings; Krisha Fairchild; Tim Conner; Michele Mariana; Todd Tolces
- Music by: Jon Newton
- Country of origin: United States
- Original language: English

Production
- Executive producer: Will Vinton
- Producer: Paul Diener
- Cinematography: Bruce McKean
- Animators: John Ashlee Prat; Teresa Drilling; Chuck Duke; Jeff Mulcaster; (lead animators)
- Editor: Scott Sundholm
- Running time: 23 minutes
- Production company: Will Vinton Productions

Original release
- Network: CBS
- Release: May 29, 1991

Claymation Comedy of Horrors (also known as Will Vinton's Claymation Comedy of Horrors) is a 1991 Halloween stop-motion short film by Will Vinton. Animator Teresa Drilling won an Emmy for Outstanding Individual Achievement for her work on this short. It was produced in 1990, and broadcast on CBS on May 29, 1991.

== Plot ==
In the middle of a forest on Halloween, an anthropomorphic pig named Wilshire and his two employees, a snail named Sheldon and another pig named Vince, field-test a new rocket-themed carnival ride, with Vince strapped in as the test subject. The ride consists of a rocket connected to an arm that arcs into the air and violently crashes into an anvil, dislodging any loose change from the pockets of an unsuspecting rider. Ecstatic over the results, Wilshire cranks the machine up full-blast, ignoring Sheldon's protests. However, the ride is unable to take the stress and overloads, causing the rocket module to detach from the arm and fly off into the air with Vince still in it.

Sheldon falls into the blast crater the rocket made and finds a glowing medallion attached to a journal. Upon picking up the journal, he and Wilshire learn about Victor Frankenswine and his backstory: one Halloween night many years ago, he created an all-powerful monster that could "rival the gods", but his castle was raided by an angry mob of peasants. Frankenswine managed to launch his journal through a window but was struck by lightning and killed while confronting the mob. Now that Wilshire and Sheldon have found the lost journal, if they follow the map imprinted on Sheldon's tongue, they can win Frankenswine's monster among other prizes such as a tote bag.

Seeing this as a ticket to money and power, Wilshire successfully brings a reluctant Sheldon along by convincing him that all he wants is the tote bag and not the monster. When the two protagonists arrive at the castle, they are cordially invited in by a green monster who mistakes Wilshire for Dr. Jekyll and Sheldon for Mr. Hyde. The protagonists find that a Halloween Monster Convention is being held inside the castle and that no non-monster mortals, especially themselves, are allowed. After a series of mishaps, such as unsuccessfully demonstrating at a live science demo, the protagonists come across Wilshire's dead grandmother, who finds out that they are still alive and sounds an alarm to inform the other monsters.

With their cover blown, Wilshire and Sheldon make a run for it. While running away from the monsters, they find a pay phone, and Wilshire hits it to check for any loose change until finding a medallion not unlike the one Sheldon found earlier. The protagonists then fall through a trapdoor and find themselves in the lab of Frankenswine. Wilshire and Sheldon find the monster about the size of Wilshire's thumb, lying dormant. A drop of a magical blue elixir falls on the monster's head, bringing it to life. Another drop of elixir makes the monster grow larger and more vicious, but before they can add any more, the other monsters start to break in, causing the protagonists to accidentally knock the diminutive monster into a floor drain.

Confronted by the other monsters, Wilshire pours more elixir down the drain, allowing the monster to grow large enough to destroy the castle within, scaring off the other monsters and forcing them to escape, leaving Wilshire positioned on top of the monster's head. After using up the last of the elixir, Wilshire sings "Climb Ev'ry Mountain" and has the now-gigantic monster take its first steps, ignoring Sheldon's protests. Before the song reaches the climax, Wilshire finds Vince flying on the rocket, buzzing around the monster's head until it punctures its nose, causing it to deflate to its original size, much to Wilshire's dismay. While Vince tries to re-inflate the monster with a bicycle pump, Sheldon announces that he has found the tote bag, which Wilshire pushes off in rejection, unaware that inside of it was another bottle of elixir. During the credits sequence, the elixir can be seen spilling into the ground.

== Voice actors ==
- Brian Cummings: Sheldon Snail, Famine, Blob, Slashmaster Salesman
- Krisha Fairchild: Registration Monster
- Tim Conner: Vince Pig
- Michele Mariana: Wilshire Pig, Wilshire's Grandmother
- Todd Tolces: Dr. Victor Frankenswine, Talking Diary, Vampire Maitre'D

== Reception ==
- review at The Film Reel
