= Fred Savage =

American actor and director (born 1976)

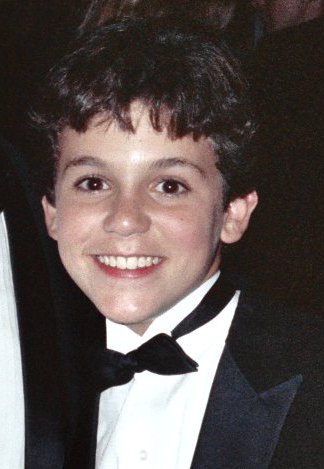
- Savage in 1990
- Born: Frederick Aaron Savage; July 9, 1976 (age 50); Chicago, Illinois, U.S.
- Education: Stanford University
- Occupations: Actor; director
- Years active: 1985–present
- Spouse: Jennifer Lynn Stone (m. 2004)
- Children: 3
- Relatives: Ben Savage (brother); Kala Savage (sister)

Frederick Aaron Savage (born July 9, 1976) is an American actor and director. He is best known for his role as Kevin Arnold in the American television series The Wonder Years (1988–1993). He has earned several awards and nominations, such as People's Choice Awards and Young Artist Awards. He is also known for playing the Grandson in The Princess Bride, and voiced the title protagonist in Oswald. Savage has worked as a director, and in 2005 later starred in the television sitcom Crumbs. Savage returned to acting in the television series The Grinder, as well as the Netflix series Friends from College. He was fired from a The Wonder Years reboot in 2022 after the revelation of various misconduct allegations.

== Early life and education ==
Savage was born in Chicago, to Joanne and Lewis Savage, who was an industrial real estate broker and consultant. Savage grew up in Glencoe, Illinois, before moving to Southern California. His younger brother is actor Ben Savage and his younger sister is actress/musician Kala Savage. His grandparents were of Polish-Jewish, Ukrainian-Jewish, German-Jewish and Latvian-Jewish extract. He was raised in Reform Judaism.

Savage was educated at Brentwood School, a private school in Los Angeles. He graduated from Stanford University in 1999, with a bachelor's degree in English and as a member of Sigma Alpha Epsilon fraternity.

== Career ==
=== Acting ===
Savage's first screen performance was in the television show Morningstar/Eveningstar, at the age of nine. He then appeared onscreen in The Boy Who Could Fly, Dinosaurs!, and several television shows, including The Twilight Zone and Crime Story before gaining national attention as the grandson in the 1987 film The Princess Bride opposite Peter Falk.

In 1988, Savage starred in his most well-known role as Kevin Arnold on the comedy-drama television series The Wonder Years, which earned him two Golden Globe nominations for Best Actor – Television Series Musical or Comedy and two Primetime Emmy nominations for Outstanding Lead Actor in a Comedy Series. At the age of thirteen, he was the youngest actor ever to receive these honors. He remained on the show until it ended in 1993. During this period, he appeared in several films, most notably Vice Versa (1988), and also starred in Little Monsters and The Wizard. After The Wonder Years ended, Savage returned to high school at age 17, and later attended Stanford. His first television role after high school was the NBC sitcom Working, which Savage starred in for its two-season run. Savage also had a series of guest and supporting roles in the late 1990s and the 2000s such as on the show Boy Meets World, (which starred his younger brother Ben Savage), Law & Order: Special Victims Unit, The Legend of Prince Valiant, and the film Austin Powers in Goldmember as The Mole.

Savage has lent his voice to several animated projects, including Family Guy, Kim Possible, Justice League Unlimited, Oswald, and Holidaze: The Christmas That Almost Didn't Happen. His two lead roles since The Wonder Years were on the short-lived sitcoms Working and Crumbs. He ranked at #27 on VH1's 100 Greatest Kid Stars.

In July 2008, Savage guest-starred in the web series The Rascal on Crackle.

In 2015, Savage returned to acting with the Fox series The Grinder. Producer Nick Stoller approached Savage about playing the role of Stewart on The Grinder. Savage was uninterested at first, but agreed to meet with the producers of the series because his children attended school with Stoller's children. Savage eventually agreed to take on the role. The Grinder was canceled by Fox on May 16, 2016.

In 2017, he joined the cast of the Netflix series Friends from College as Max Adler, a gay literary agent.

=== Directing and producing ===
In 1999, Savage began his directing career in which he helmed episodes of over a dozen television series. Savage's first directing credit was on the short-lived NBC sitcom Working which also starred Savage. Following Working, Savage began observing production on the Disney Channel show Even Stevens to further learn the craft of directing. Savage also learned by shadowing Amy Sherman-Palladino, Todd Holland, and James Burrows.

His credits include Zoey 101, Drake & Josh, Ned's Declassified School Survival Guide and Big Time Rush for Nickelodeon, as well as That's So Raven, Hannah Montana, and Wizards of Waverly Place for Disney Channel. Additionally, Savage has directed for prime-time network sitcoms including Modern Family and 2 Broke Girls.

Besides directing several episodes, Savage co-produced the Disney Channel Original Series Phil of the Future. In 2007, he was nominated for a Directors Guild award for the Phil episode "Not-So-Great-Great Grandpa".

Savage has served as a producer for several episodes of It's Always Sunny in Philadelphia, Friends with Benefits, Party Down, Phil of the Future, The Crazy Ones, and Happy Endings.

In 2007, he made his feature film directorial debut with the children's comedy film Daddy Day Camp, for which he was nominated for Worst Director at the 28th Golden Raspberry Awards.

== Misconduct allegations ==
In 1993, Savage, then 16, and his Wonder Years co-star Jason Hervey were accused of sexual harassment in a lawsuit filed by the show's former costume designer. Monique Long alleged the young actors "verbally and physically harassed her daily," with her complaints over their behavior ignored by the show's staff. The lawsuit was settled out of court.

In March 2018, a costume designer on The Grinder accused Savage of assault and intimidation and filed a complaint in Los Angeles Superior Court alleging assault, battery, and gender discrimination. Savage denied the allegations. Fox later stated that an investigation cleared the actor of any wrongdoing.

On May 6, 2022, Savage was fired as executive producer and director of The Wonder Years reboot after an investigation into alleged inappropriate conduct. While Savage stated that "some of the claims were untrue", he also stated that he was going to work on changing any perceived negative behavior.

== Personal life ==
Fred Savage married his childhood friend Jennifer Lynn Stone on August 7, 2004. They have three children.

== Filmography ==
=== Film ===
List of Fred Savage film credits
Year	Title	Functioned as			Notes	Ref.
Year	Title	Actor	Director	Role	Notes	Ref.
1986	The Boy Who Could Fly	Yes	No	Louis Michaelson	Young Artist Award for Best Supporting Young Actor – Motion Picture	
1987	Dinosaurs!	Yes	No	Phillip		
1987	The Princess Bride	Yes	No	The Grandson	Young Artist Award for Best Young Actor – Motion Picture	
1988	Vice Versa	Yes	No	Charlie Seymour / Marshall Seymour	Saturn Award for Best Young Performer	
1989	Little Monsters	Yes	No	Brian Stevenson		
1989	The Wizard	Yes	No	Corey Woods	Nominated – Young Artist Award for Best Young Actor – Motion Picture	
1997	A Guy Walks Into a Bar	Yes	No	Josh Cohen	Short film	
1998	Jungle Book: Mowgli's Story	Yes	No	Himself (Narrator)		
2002	The Rules of Attraction	Yes	No	"A Junkie Named Marc"		
2002	Austin Powers in Goldmember	Yes	No	Number Three / Mole		
2004	The Last Run	Yes	No	Steven Goodson		
2004	Welcome to Mooseport	Yes	No	Bullard		
2007	Daddy Day Camp	No	Yes	—N/a	Feature film directorial debut Nominated – Golden Raspberry Award for Worst Director	
2018	Super Troopers 2	Yes	No	Himself	Cameo in post-film scene	
2018	Once Upon a Deadpool	Yes	No	The Grandson / Himself	PG-13 cut of Deadpool 2	

=== Television ===
List of Fred Savage television credits
Year	Title	Functioned as				Notes	Ref.
Year	Title	Actor	Director	Producer	Role	Notes	Ref.
1986	The Twilight Zone	Yes	No	No	Jeff Mattingly	Episode: "What Are Friends For?/Aqua Vita"	
1986–1987	Morningstar/Eveningstar	Yes	No	No	Alan Bishop	7 episodes	
1987	Convicted: A Mother's Story	Yes	No	No	Matthew Nickerson	Television film	
1987	Hello Kitty's Furry Tale Theater	Uncredited	No	No	Mowser	Episode: "Phantom of the Theater"	
1988	ABC Weekend Special: Runaway Ralph	Yes	No	No	Garfield	Television film	
1988	Run Till You Fall	Yes	No	No	David Reuben	Television film	
1988–1993	The Wonder Years	Yes	No	No	Kevin Arnold	Lead role; 115 episodes People's Choice Award for Favorite TV Performer (1989–90); Viewers for Quality Television Award Award for Best Actor in a Quality Comedy Series (1989–90); Young Artist Award for Best Young Actor in a Television Series (1988–89); Nominated – Golden Globe Award for Best Actor – Television Series Musical or Comedy (1989–90); Nominated – Primetime Emmy Award for Outstanding Lead Actor in a Comedy Series (1989–90)	
1990	When You Remember Me	Yes	No	No	Mike Mills	Television film	
1990	Saturday Night Live	Yes	No	No	Himself	Host; episode: "Fred Savage/Technotronic"	
1991	Christmas on Division Street	Yes	No	No	Trevor Atwood	Television film	
1992	Seinfeld	Yes	No	No	Himself	Episode: "The Trip"	
1996	No One Would Tell	Yes	No	No	Bobby Tennison	Television film	
1996	How Do You Spell God?	Yes	No	No	Himself (Narrator)	Television film	
1997	The Outer Limits	Yes	No	No	Danny Martin	Episode: "Last Supper"	
1997–1999	Working	Yes	Yes	No	Matt Peyser	Lead role; 39 episodes	
1998	Boy Meets World	Yes	No	No	Stuart	Episode: "Everybody Loves Stuart"	
1999–2000	Boy Meets World	No	Yes	No	—N/a	2 episodes	
2001	All About Us	No	Yes	No	—N/a	2 episodes	
2001–2002	Even Stevens	No	Yes	No	—N/a	2 episodes	
2001–2003	Oswald	Yes	No	No	Oswald	Voice, 25 episodes	
2001–2003	Nick Jr.	Yes	No	No	Himself (Host)	Host from September 3, 2001 – August 29, 2003	
2003	Law & Order: Special Victims Unit	Yes	No	No	Michael Gardner	Episode: "Futility"	
2003–2005	That's So Raven	No	Yes	No	—N/a	2 episodes	
2004	Justice League Unlimited	Yes	No	No	Hank Hall / Hawk	Voice, episode: "Hawk and Dove"	
2004	Drake & Josh	No	Yes	No	—N/a	1 episode	
2004–2005	Unfabulous	No	Yes	No	—N/a	5 episodes	
2004–2006	Phil of the Future	No	Yes	Yes	—N/a	9 episodes Nominated – Directors Guild of America Award for Outstanding Directorial Achievement in a Children's Program (Episode: "Not So Great Great Great Grandpa")	
2004–2007	Kim Possible	Yes	No	No	Wego	Voice, 2 episodes	
2004–2007	Ned's Declassified School Survival Guide	No	Yes	No	—N/a	6 episodes	
2005	Kitchen Confidential	No	Yes	No	—N/a	1 episode	
2005	Zoey 101	No	Yes	No	—N/a	2 episodes	
2005	What I Like About You	No	Yes	No	—N/a	1 episode	
2006	Crumbs	Yes	No	No	Mitch Crumb	Lead role; 13 episodes	
2006	Holidaze: The Christmas That Almost Didn't Happen	Yes	No	No	Rusty	Voice, TV special	
2007	Cavemen	No	Yes	No	—N/a	1 episode	
2007	Hannah Montana	No	Yes	No	—N/a	1 episode	
2007–2008	Doozers	No	Yes	No	—N/a	4 episodes	
2007–2008	Wizards of Waverly Place	No	Yes	No	—N/a	3 episodes Nominated – Directors Guild of America Award for Outstanding Directorial Achievement in a Children's Program (Episode "The Crazy 10 Minute Sale")	
2007–2009	It's Always Sunny in Philadelphia	No	Yes	Yes	—N/a	19 episodes	
2008	Ugly Betty	No	Yes	No	—N/a	1 episode	
2008	Worst Week	No	Yes	No	—N/a	1 episode	
2009	Family Guy	Yes	No	No	Himself	Voice, episode: "Fox-y Lady"	
2009	Zeke and Luther	No	Yes	No	—N/a	Pilot episode Nominated – Directors Guild of America Award for Outstanding Directorial Achievement in a Children's Program (Episode "Pilot")	
2009	Ruby & the Rockits	No	Yes	No	—N/a	1 episode	
2009–2010	Greek	No	Yes	No	—N/a	2 episodes	
2009–2010	Party Down	No	Yes	Yes	—N/a	9 episodes; executive producer	
2010	Sons of Tucson	No	Yes	No	—N/a	1 episode	
2010	Big Time Rush	No	Yes	No	—N/a	2 episodes	
2010	Blue Mountain State	No	Yes	No	—N/a	2 episodes	
2010–2013	Generator Rex	Yes	No	No	Noah Nixon	Voice, 22 episodes	
2010–2020	Modern Family	No	Yes	No	—N/a	14 episodes	
2011	Gigantic	No	Yes	No	—N/a	2 episodes	
2011	Breaking In	No	Yes	No	—N/a	1 episode	
2011	Perfect Couples	No	Yes	No	—N/a	2 episodes	
2011	Franklin & Bash	No	Yes	No	—N/a	1 episode	
2011	Friends with Benefits	No	Yes	No	—N/a	1 episode	
2011	Mr. Sunshine	Yes	Yes	No	Himself	Episode: "Celebrity Tennis"	
2011	Happy Endings	Yes	Yes	No	Himself	3 episodes	
2011–2012	How to Be a Gentleman	No	Yes	No	—N/a	2 episodes	
2011–2016	2 Broke Girls	No	Yes	No	—N/a	20 episodes	
2012	Whitney	No	Yes	No	—N/a	1 episode	
2012	Best Friends Forever	No	Yes	Yes	—N/a	6 episodes; executive producer	
2013	The Michael J. Fox Show	No	Yes	No	—N/a	1 episode	
2013	The Crazy Ones	No	Yes	No	—N/a	2 episodes	
2014	Super Fun Night	No	Yes	No	—N/a	1 episode	
2014	Growing Up Fisher	No	Yes	No	—N/a	1 episode	
2014	Friends with Better Lives	No	Yes	No	—N/a	4 episodes	
2014	Playing House	No	Yes	No	—N/a	2 episodes	
2014	Bad Teacher	No	Yes	No	—N/a	1 episode	
2014	Garfunkel and Oates	No	Yes	Yes	—N/a	8 episodes; executive producer	
2014	Marry Me	No	Yes	No	—N/a	1 episode	
2014–2016	BoJack Horseman	Yes	No	No	Goober / Richie Osborne	Voice, 2 episodes	
2014–2019	The Goldbergs	No	Yes	No	—N/a	2 episodes	
2015	Sin City Saints	No	Yes	No	—N/a	2 episodes	
2015–2016	The Grinder	Yes	No	No	Stewart Sanderson	Lead role; 22 episodes Nominated – Critics' Choice Award for Best Actor in a Comedy Series	
2015–2016	Casual	No	Yes	No	—N/a	3 episodes	
2017	Fresh Off the Boat	No	Yes	No	—N/a	1 episode	
2017–2019	Friends from College	Yes	No	No	Max Adler	Main cast; 2 seasons	
2018	Child Support	Yes	No	No	Himself	Host. In 2018, he began to host Child Support (originally called Five to Survive) with Ricky Gervais.	
2018	Robot Chicken	Yes	No	No	Oswald, Steve, Westworld Investor	Voice, episode: "Scoot to the Gute"	
2018	Modern Family	Yes	No	No	Caleb	Episode: "Dear Beloved Family"	
2018	LA to Vegas	No	Yes	No	—N/a	Episode: "Parking Lot B"	
2018	Bob's Burgers	Yes	No	No	Parker	Voice, episode: "Boywatch"	
2018–2019	The Cool Kids	No	Yes	No	—N/a	4 episodes	
2018–2021	The Conners	Yes	Yes	No	Dr. Harding	7 episodes	
2019	What Just Happened??! with Fred Savage	Yes	No	No	Himself	Host	
2019–2020	Single Parents	No	Yes	No	—N/a	4 episodes	
2020	Black-ish	No	Yes	No	—N/a	3 episodes	
2020	Indebted	No	Yes	No	—N/a	1 episode	
2020	Home Movie: The Princess Bride	Yes	No	No	The Grandson	Episode: "Chapter One: As You Wish"	
2020	Dash & Lily	No	Yes	No	—N/a	4 episodes	
2021–2022	The Wonder Years	No	Yes	Executive	—N/a	4 episodes	
2022	The Afterparty	Yes	No	No	Vaughn	Episode: "Danner"	
2024	Three Women	Yes	No	No	Rody	2 episodes	
