= The Great Cognito =

- Directed by: Will Vinton
- Written by: Susan Shadburne; John Morrison
- Produced by: Will Vinton
- Starring: John Morrison (voice)
- Music by: Billy Scream
- Production company: Will Vinton Productions
- Distributed by: Pyramid Films
- Release date: 1982
- Running time: 4 minutes
- Country: United States
- Language: English

The Great Cognito is a 1982 Oscar-nominated claymation short directed by Will Vinton. In 1987, it was edited into Festival of Claymation as the eighth and final segment.

== Plot ==
A stand up comedian, known as "a man with a thousand faces", talks about war, transforming into and adopting the faces of World War II-era figures.

== Accolades ==
- 1983: Nominated for an Academy Award for Best Animated Short Film

== Reception and legacy ==
Film director Paul Bartel stated at the 1983 San Francisco Film Festival that:

He can turn himself into anyone or anything, thanks to clay animation.

The Academy Film Archive preserved The Great Cognito in 2012.
