= Shadow Play (film) =

- Directed by: Susan Shadburne
- Written by: Susan Shadburne
- Produced by: Dan Biggs; Susan Shadburne; Will Vinton
- Starring: Dee Wallace; Cloris Leachman; Ron Kuhlman
- Cinematography: Ron Oriuex
- Music by: Jon Newton
- Production companies: Millennium Productions; Will Vinton Studios
- Distributed by: New World Pictures
- Release date: September 26, 1986 (Los Angeles)
- Running time: 101 minutes
- Country: United States
- Language: English
- Budget: $2 million

Shadow Play is a 1986 American supernatural drama film directed by Susan Shadburne. It stars Dee Wallace and Cloris Leachman. The plot follows a playwright with unresolved grief issues following her lover's suicide, and her return seven years later to the town where he died. A lighthouse, the scene of the tragedy, becomes a symbol of the interplay of light and shadow, and of the terminus between life and the afterlife.

== Plot ==
Playwright Morgan Hanna has been suffering from vivid recurring nightmares since the suicide of her fiancé, Jeremy, seven years ago. No one else was believed present when he apparently jumped from the top of a lighthouse. She feels that she failed him in some way, and that she could have done more to prevent his death. Her grief is causing writer's block, preventing her from finishing an overdue comedy. Her psychologist tells her she isn't processing her grief, and the nightmares are likely to continue. Jeremy's mother, also still grieving both Jeremy and her husband, invites her to visit their hometown, the town where Jeremy died. Morgan seizes this as an opportunity to face her torment.

After settling in, Morgan begins developing a play about loss. The text unintentionally incorporates supernatural elements. Morgan sees glimpses of Jeremy's face in windows and mirrors. As the writing continues, the main character—initially based on Morgan—begins taking on aspects of Jeremy's personality, and she believes he is trying to communicate with her through the play. As the text increasingly deviates from Morgan's intent and seems to write itself, she begins questioning her sanity. Jeremy's brother, John, takes advantage of Morgan's psychological vulnerability to seduce her. Morgan believes Jeremy is using John to join with her physically.

Morgan becomes distraught. In her fragile mental state, she believes that only joining with Jeremy through death will end her pain. After a successful first reading of the play, she heads for the lighthouse to jump to her death.

John tries to stop her by telling her that Jeremy wouldn't want this. Then he breaks his silence about what really happened seven years ago: Jeremy didn't commit suicide, his death was accidental. He was trying to prevent John from jumping to his death.

Relieved of her emotional burden, Morgan leaves the lighthouse. She calls her agent to announce she is returning home with a new play. In her room, she finds a note from Jeremy, releasing her and wishing her happiness.

== Cast ==
- Dee Wallace as Morgan Hanna
- Cloris Leachman as Millie Crown
- Ron Kuhlman as John Crown
- Barry Laws as Jeremy Crown
- Delia Salvi as Bette
- Susan Dixon as Zelda
- Al Strobel as Byron

== Production ==
Shadow Play was directed by Susan Shadburne, a frequently collaborator and then spouse of Will Vinton who served as a producer on the film. Shadburne wrote the film under the initial title of Ghostwriter after having got the idea for the film after a visit to Orcas Island, and was inspired by a stone tower on the island to write a film with such a tower as a focal point. After Millennium Pictures was formed in 1982, Shadburne spent two years taking the screenplay through five drafts and raising capital with her partners. Shadburne sent her script to talent agents in the hopes of attracting name actors with Cloris Leachman responding, who in turn suggested Dee Wallace to Shadburne. and Wallace readily accepted.

Principal photography for Shadow Play began in October 1984 and continued for six weeks. Filming took place in Portland, Oregon and the San Juan Islands in Washington. Despite sometimes having to deal with 80 mph winds on the lighthouse catwalk or a viral outbreak amongst the crew from working 18-20 hour days, the movie was completed on schedule.

== Home media ==
Shadow Play was released on VHS on October 10, 1991, by Starmaker Video. It also aired often on cable TV during the 1980s. The film was released as part of a 6-film DVD set entitled Horror Collection Extravaganza: 6 Terrifying Movies on September 4, 2012. On May 20, 2020, a newly restored edition of the film was released for the first time on Blu-ray by Scorpion Releasing.
