= Rowby Goren =

American writer specializing in comedy

Rowby Goren is an American writer specializing in comedy. He was a part of the writing team of the comedy series Rowan & Martin's Laugh-In, created by George Schlatter. Goren's writing talents range from variety shows to situation comedy, game shows, cartoons, as well as directing Joe Roth and Neal Israel's comedy feature Cracking Up. Goren was Creative Director of Joe Roth and Neal Israel's cult video Tunnel Vision. Goren won an Emmy for writing Hollywood Squares. He also wrote for numerous animated series including Fat Albert and the Cosby Kids, He-Man and the Masters of the Universe, The Berenstain Bears, Tiny Toon Adventures, Teenage Mutant Ninja Turtles, The Busy World of Richard Scarry, The Adventures of Paddington Bear, The Super Mario Bros. Super Show!, Adventures of Sonic the Hedgehog as well as Saturday morning series such as various Sid and Marty Krofft's H.R. Pufnstuf series.

== Screenwriting credits ==
=== Television ===
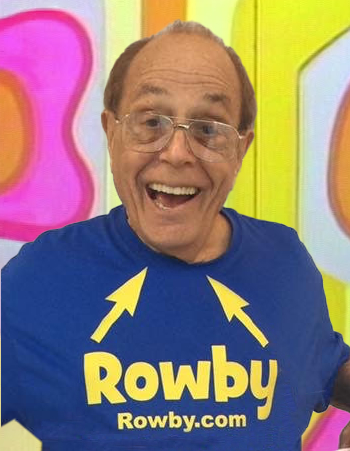
- Rowby Goren in front of Laugh-In Joke Wall Set
  Rowan & Martin’s Laugh-In (1970–1971, 1973)
- Hollywood Squares (1973)
- Tony Orlando and Dawn (1974)
- The Krofft Superstar Hour (1978)
- Three's Company (1979)
- The Super Globetrotters (1979)
- Pink Lady (1980)
- The Little Rascals (1982)
- Hart to Hart (1982)
- Fat Albert and the Cosby Kids (1984)
- Saturday Supercade (1984)
- Alvin and the Chipmunks (1984)
- Pole Position (1984)
- He-Man and the Masters of the Universe (1984–1985)
- The Berenstain Bears (1985–1987)
- Rambo: The Force of Freedom (1986)
- Ghostbusters (1986)
- Potato Head Kids (1986–1987)
- Teen Wolf (1986–1987)
- CBS Storybreak (1987)
- BraveStarr (1987)
- Garbage Pail Kids (1987–1988)
- The New Adventures of Beany and Cecil (1988)
- The California Raisin Show (1989)
- The Super Mario Bros. Super Show! (1989)
- Teenage Mutant Ninja Turtles (1989–1990)
- Barnyard Commandos (1990)
- Tiny Toon Adventures (1990)
- The Adventures of Super Mario Bros. 3 (1990)
- Bill & Ted's Excellent Adventures (1990–1991)
- The Raisins: Sold Out! The California Raisins II (1990)
- Captain Planet and the Planeteers (1991)
- Where's Wally? (1991)
- Super Dave: Daredevil for Hire (1992)
- Adventures of Sonic the Hedgehog (1993)
- Madeline (1993)
- Taz-Mania (1994)
- The Busy World of Richard Scarry (1994–1995)
- Beast Wars: Transformers (1996)
- The Little Lulu Show (1996)
- Arthur (1996)
- The Wacky World of Tex Avery (1997)
- Animal Crackers (1998)
- The Rainbow Fish (2000)
- Gadget & the Gadgetinis (2002)
