= Meet the Raisins! =

1988 claymation television special

- VHS cover for the film.
- Created by: California Raisin Advisory Board
- Based on: The California Raisins
- Screenplay by: Arthur Sellers
- Story by: Barry Bruce; Mark Gustafson; Craig Bartlett; Arthur Sellers
- Directed by: Barry Bruce
- Starring: Karreem; David Scully; David Downing; Ted Roisum; Todd Tolces; P.Q. Baer; Tim Conner; Randy Patterson; Marly Stone
- Country of origin: United States

Production
- Producer: Will Vinton
- Editor: Kelley Baker
- Running time: 27 minutes
- Production company: Will Vinton Productions

Original release
- Network: CBS
- Release: November 4, 1988

Related
- The Raisins: Sold Out!: The California Raisins II (1990)

Meet the Raisins! is a 1988 claymation television special directed by Barry Bruce, featuring the advertising characters The California Raisins. The show was broadcast November 4, 1988, on the U.S. television network CBS during primetime. It was the Raisins' second appearance in a primetime special and their first dedicated feature. Meet the Raisins! was followed by a sequel in 1990, Raisins: Sold Out! This special premiered after one of the This Is America, Charlie Brown specials.

For the first time, the California Raisins were given individual names and characterizations: A.C. Arborman (vocals), his younger brother Beebop Arborman (drums), their cousin Red Raisin (guitar/piano), and their friend Stamford "Stretch" Thompson (bass).

The 24-minute special shortly followed its similarly titled soundtrack album released on August 8, 1988 on Atlantic Records. Aired during the characters' peak in popularity, Meet the Raisins! is presented in a mockumentary style depicting the Raisins' musical career. It was nominated for the 1989 Primetime Emmy Award for Outstanding Animated Program.

== Plot ==
Meet the Raisins! spoofs musical documentaries with its use of anthropomorphic produce characters. Through its historical perspective, the special also provided an opportunity to elaborate on the personalities and introduce names of the simple yet popular characters. It follows the California Raisins' humble beginnings, rise to musical success, fall from stardom, and eventual comeback. This includes "home movie" clips, scenes of the group's early days as the Vine-Yls, concert footage, and interviews with the people behind the success of the California Raisins, including manager Rudy Bagaman. The group is also shown performing various hit songs.

== Reception ==
The special gained praise for its witty, family-friendly humor, as well as its impressive clay animation, which was state-of-the-art at the time.

=== Award nominations ===
- 1989 Primetime Emmy Award nomination for Outstanding Animated Program

== Soundtrack ==
Meet the Raisins!

Soundtrack album by The California Raisins
- Released: August 29, 1988
- Genre: Soundtrack
- Label: Atlantic

Soundtrack
Review scores
| Source | Rating |
|---|---|
| Allmusic | link |

Meet the Raisins! is the official soundtrack to the CBS television special of the same name. It consists of covers early rock & roll hits as well as R&B hits largely from the Motown era.

Although the claymation images of the California Raisins appear throughout the package, the group name "The California Raisins" does not appear on the front cover, the spine or the label of the record, and the artist name would appear to be Meet The Raisins. However, this album is commonly listed as a California Raisins album -- although the version of the California Raisins heard on this album is not the same group as heard on their previous LPs. While Buddy Miles, Ellis Hall and Niki Harris were previously the lead voices of the California Raisins, this recording features the vocals of Karreem, Jay Koonce, Andy Stokes, Linda Hornbuckle and Micheal Brummel. As well, the version of "I Heard It Through the Grapevine" heard here is not the hit version that reached #84 on the Billboard Hot 100 in 1988 (and which was sung by Miles), but a completely different recording.

The soundtrack received praise from Allmusic's Peter Fawthrop who named it an AMG Album Pick.

=== Track listing ===
1. "Signed, Sealed, Delivered I'm Yours"
2. "Shotgun"
3. "Green Onions"
4. "Ain't Too Proud to Beg"
5. "At the Hop"
6. "Get a Job"
7. "Cool Jerk"
8. "Tears on My Pillow"
9. "Tutti Frutti"
10. "Papa Oom Mow Mow"
11. "Sh-Boom"
12. "I Heard It Through the Grapevine"

== Releases ==
Meet the Raisins! was released on VHS on March 14, 1989. It was re-released on September 12, 1990 with a California Raisin plush doll.

The special was released on DVD November 15, 2011. Included in the set is the sequel to the claymation special, The Raisins: Sold Out!: The California Raisins II along with all 13 episodes of the animated series, The California Raisin Show and 4 original TV ads.

== The Raisins Sold Out!: The California Raisins II ==
The Raisins Sold Out!: The California Raisins II
- Created by: California Raisin Advisory Board; Will Vinton Studios
- Based on: The California Raisins
- Written by: Rowby Goren
- Directed by: Will Vinton
- Starring: Brian Cummings; Jim Cummings; Dorian Harewood; Brian Mitchell; David Scully; Todd Tolces
- Country of origin: United States

Production
- Running time: 24 minutes

Original release
- Network: CBS
- Release: August 29, 1990

Related
- Meet the Raisins! (1988)

The Raisins Sold Out!: The California Raisins II is a 1990 claymation television special directed by Will Vinton, featuring the advertising characters The California Raisins. The show was broadcast August 29, 1990, on the U.S. television network CBS during primetime. It was the sequel to the Emmy-nominated special Meet the Raisins! in 1988.

This special has the band hiring a slick-talking new manager, Leonard Limabean, in an attempt to make a comeback. Under his guidance, the Raisins try their hand at various new musical genres, including Disco Polka, Country Rap, and Demolition Rock, to humorous effect. The group's troubles begin to manifest, however, upon the replacement of singer A.C. with their manager's young protégé, Lick Broccoli.

=== Plot ===
The eponymous Raisins (A.C., Beebop, Stretch and Red), under the guidance of manager Rudy Bagaman, are on their way to a recording studio. Along the way they are approached by talent agent Leonard Limabean who offers to be their new manager but gets turned down twice. After arriving at the recording studio (which turns out to be a garage) and performing I Heard it Through the Grapevine, the Raisins grow disappointed at their lack of progress and hire Leonard, much to Rudy's sadness.

Under the guidance of Leonard and his young protégé Lick Broccoli, the Raisins try their hand at various new musical genres such as Disco Polka, Country Rap, and Demolition Rock, to humorous effect. While Beebop, Stretch and Red are enjoying their newfound success, a cynical A.C. suspects that Leonard is exploiting them. Leonard eavesdrops on A.C. and allows Lick to crank up the special effects for the Demolition Rock song. A.C.'s voice gets hoarse during the performance, and he is escorted out of the studio after complaining to Leonard. As A.C. demands to be let back in, Leonard fakes Red's voice through an intercom, telling A.C. that the Raisins no longer want him. Leonard then forges a recording of A.C. deciding to leave the Raisins on his own. With A.C. absent, Leonard has Lick serve as the replacement lead singer.

As A.C. struggles to find a new job, he wanders around and reunites with Rudy at the Le Roach Lounge. Meanwhile the other three Raisins begin to miss A.C. and their own music, but cannot resign since their contract with Leonard is still binding. While watching a rock concert with Lick and the three Raisins on TV, Rudy notices the chained Raisins in a state of pain and sets off to rescue them. The Raisins manage to break free, hop into Rudy's U-Lug van and escape the studio as Leonard chases them with their contract.

A.C. and the other Raisins reconcile at the Le Roach Lounge as they realize that Leonard had deceived them. Guests in the lounge notice the Raisins and have them sing I Heard it Through the Grapevine, attracting a large crowd. Leonard manages to find the Raisins and, with contract in hand, tries to coax Rudy into having them back, but Rudy incinerates the contract with his cigar ashes, nullifying it and reducing Leonard to tears.

With the Raisins having made a successful comeback, Lick Broccoli resorts to performing solos. In the epilogue, Lick is at a bar doing one such solo in front of Leonard, but fails to attract a wide audience as the other patrons pay more attention to a Raisins concert on TV. This angers Lick to the point where he plays his electric guitar and blows a fuse, shutting off everything in the bar save for the TV set. As the credits roll, Leonard and Lick argue while the patrons watch the concert on TV. After the credits, Rudy asks the Raisins if they want to do a television commercial.

=== Reception ===
Valerie Monroe of Entertainment Weekly gave the special a mediocre C+ review. She described it as "a lot like traditional Saturday-morning cartoon fare: harmless, but not especially enriching."

=== Releases ===
As was its predecessor, The Raisins: Sold Out! was released in VHS.

The special was released on DVD November 15, 2011. Included in the set is the original claymation special, Meet the Raisins! along with all 13 episodes of the animated series, The California Raisin Show and 4 original TV ads.
