= Claydream =

2021 American film

Claydream is a 2021 documentary film which explores the career of Oscar-winning animator Will Vinton, known as the "Father of Claymation".
