= Raisin =

Dried grape

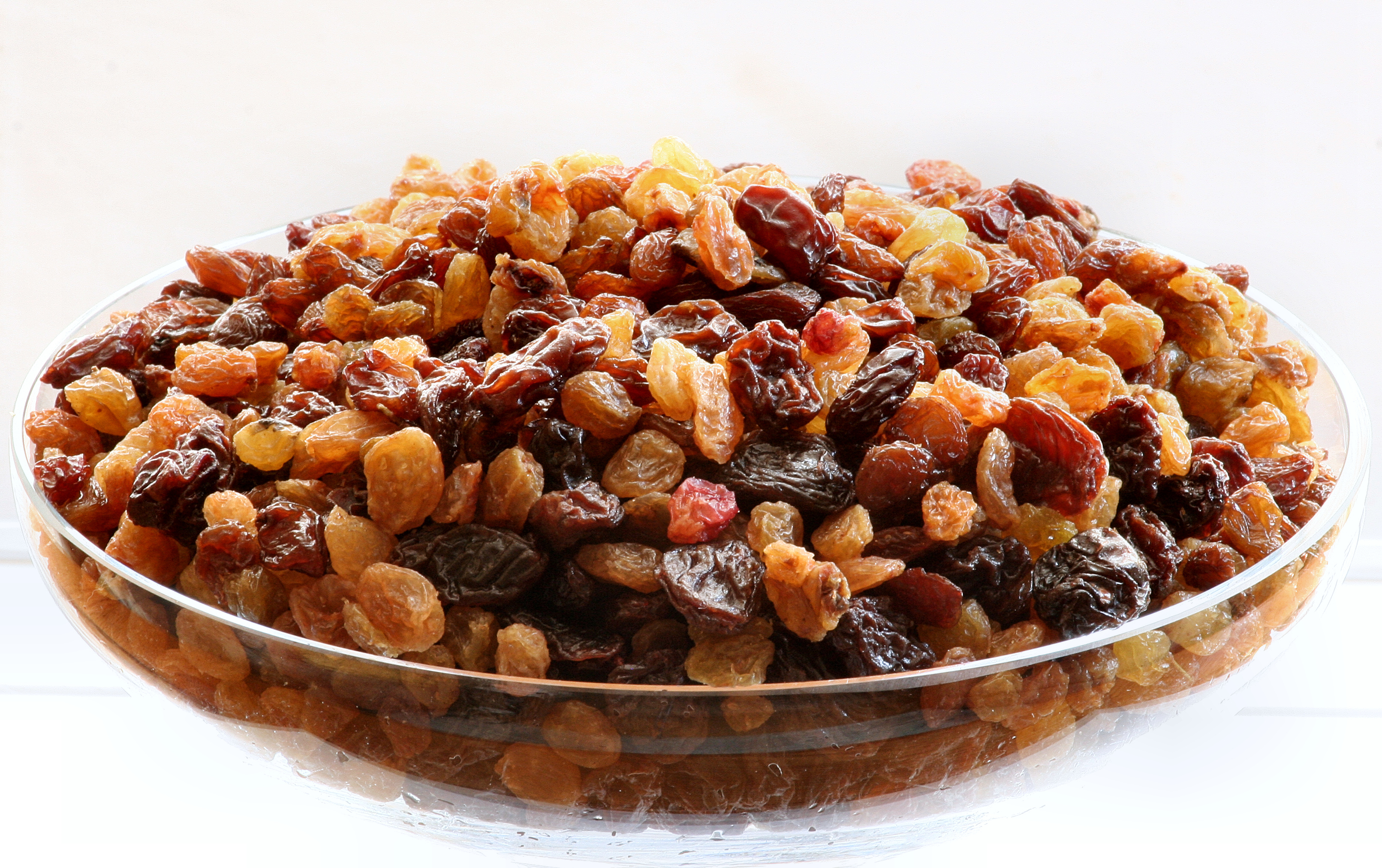
A variety of raisins from different grapes

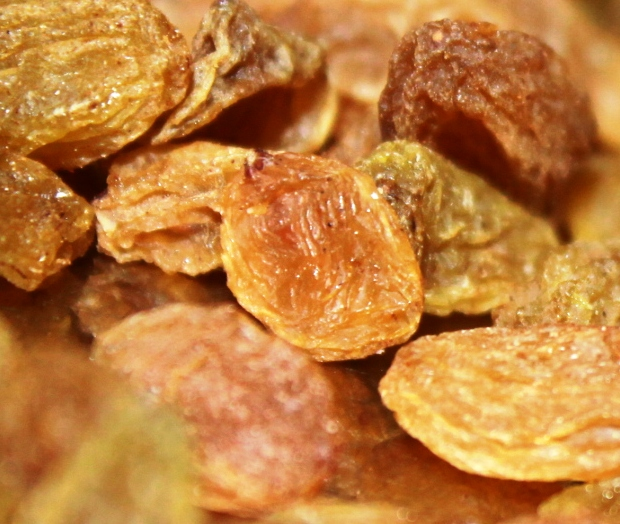
Golden raisins (sultanas)

A raisin is a dried grape. Raisins are produced in many regions of the world and may be eaten raw or used in cooking, baking, and brewing. The word raisin is commonly used for the dried dark-colored seedless grape, while sultana is a golden-colored dried grape, and currant is a dried small Black Corinth seedless grape.

== Varieties ==
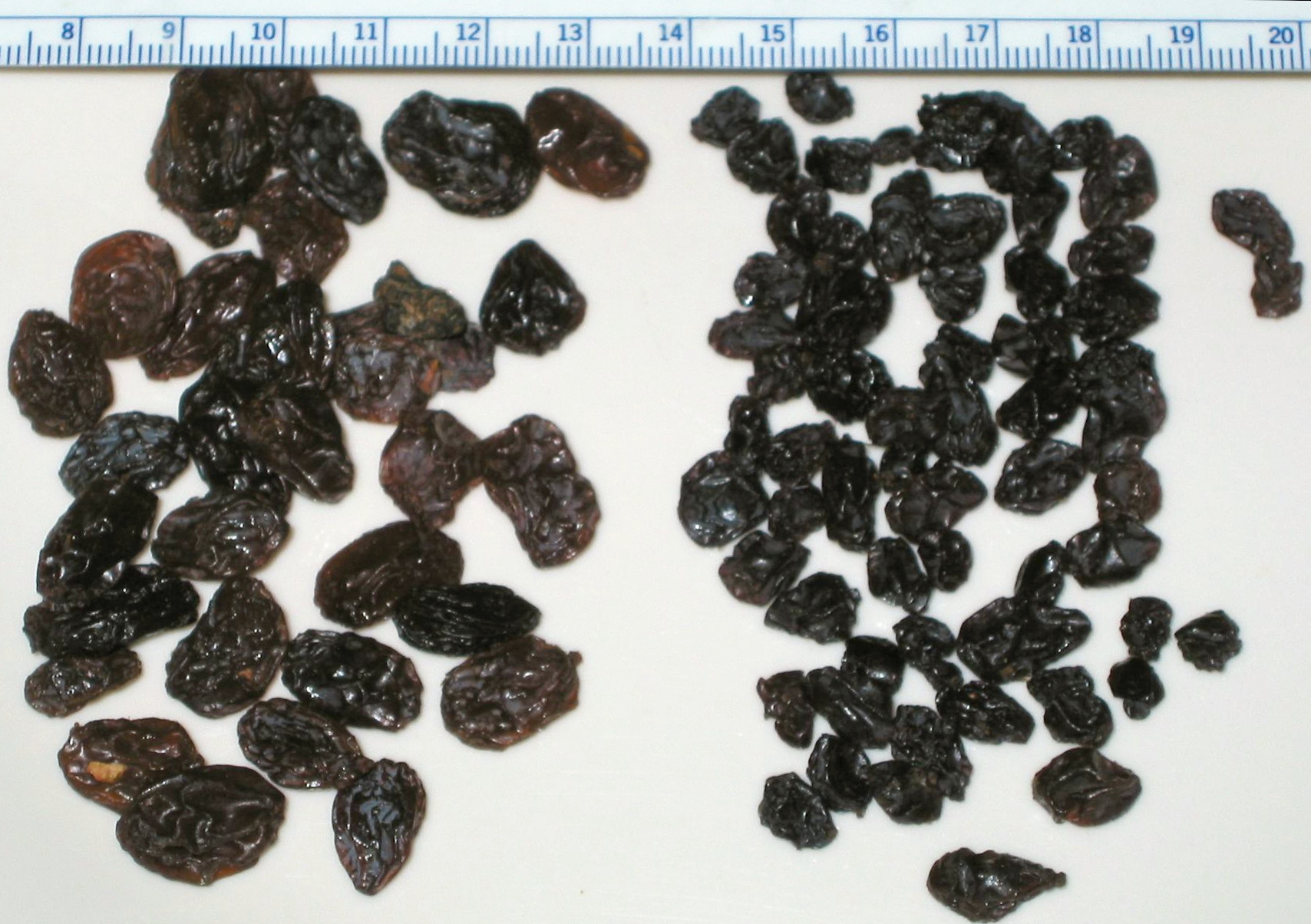
California seedless grape raisins (left) and California Zante currants

Raisin varieties depend on the types of grapes used and appear in a variety of sizes and colors, including black, brown, and yellow. Seedless varieties include sultanas (the common American type is known as Thompson Seedless in the United States), Zante currants (black Corinthian raisins, Vitis vinifera L. var. Apyrena), and Flame grapes. Raisins are traditionally sun-dried but may also be artificially dried in dehydrators with controlled temperature and humidity.

Golden raisins (sultanas) are created with a treatment of sulfur dioxide rather than purely drying them.

Black Corinth or Zante currants are small, sometimes seedless, raisins that are much darker and have a tart, tangy flavor. They are usually called currants. Muscat raisins are larger and sweeter than other varieties.

Grapes used to produce raisins in the Middle East and Asia include the large black monukka (or manucca) grapes that produce large raisins.

== Processing ==
Drying raisins at Gata de Gorgos. Video by Valencian Museum of Ethnology.

Raisins are produced commercially by drying harvested grape berries. For a grape berry to dry, water inside the grape must be removed completely from the interior of the cells onto the surface of the grape where the water droplets can evaporate. However, this diffusion process is very difficult because the grape skin contains wax in its cuticle, which prevents the water from passing through. In addition to this, the physical and chemical mechanisms located on the outer layers of the grape are adapted to prevent water loss. The three steps to commercial raisin production include pre-treatment, drying, and post-drying processes.

=== Pre-treatment ===
Pre-treatment is a necessary step in raisin production to ensure the increased rate of water removal during the drying process. A faster water removal rate decreases the rate of browning and helps to produce more desirable raisins. The historical method of completing this process was developed in the Mediterranean and Asia Minor areas by using a dry emulsion cold dip made of potassium carbonate and ethyl esters of fatty acids. This dip was shown to increase the rate of water loss by two- to three-fold.

Recently, new methods have been developed such as exposing the grapes to oil emulsions or dilute alkaline solutions. These methods can encourage water transfer to the outer surface of grapes, accelerating the drying process.

To produce golden raisins, sulfur dioxide is applied to raisins after the pre-treatment step and before drying to decrease the rate of browning caused by the reaction between polyphenol oxidase and phenolic compounds. Sulfur dioxide treatment can also help to preserve flavor and prevent the loss of certain vitamins during the drying process.

=== Drying ===
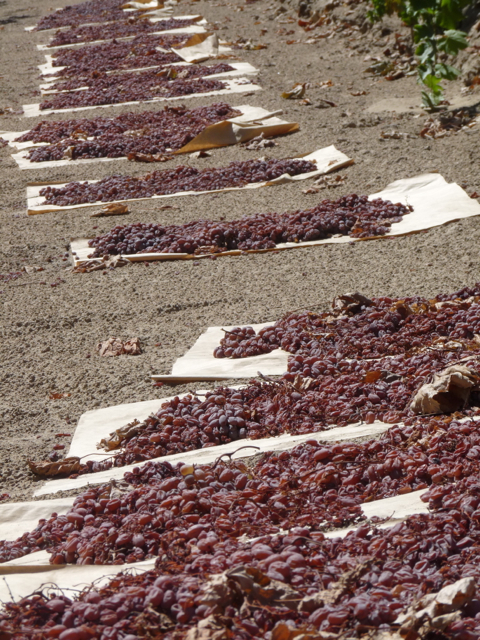
Sun-drying raisins

The three types of drying methods are sun drying, shade drying, and mechanical drying. Sun drying is an inexpensive process; however, environmental contamination, insect infestations or microbial deterioration can occur.

Mechanical drying can be done in a safer and more controlled environment where rapid drying is guaranteed. One method is microwave drying. Water molecules in the grapes absorb microwave energy, resulting in rapid evaporation. Microwave drying produces puffed raisins.

=== Post-drying processes ===
After drying, raisins are sent to processing plants where they are washed to remove foreign material that may have become embedded during the drying process. Stems and off-grade raisins are also removed. The wet raisins are then dried once again to prevent rehydration.

Raisins, seedless
Nutritional value per 100 g (3.5 oz)
- Energy: 299 kcal (1,250 kJ)
- Carbohydrates: 79.3 g
- Sugars: 65.2 g
- Dietary fiber: 4.5 g
- Fat: 0.25 g
- Protein: 3.3 g
Vitamins and minerals
Vitamins	Quantity %DV^{†}
Thiamine (B1)	9% 0.106 mg
Riboflavin (B2)	10% 0.125 mg
Niacin (B3)	5% 0.766 mg
Pantothenic acid (B5)	2% 0.095 mg
Vitamin B6	10% 0.174 mg
Folate (B9)	1% 5 μg
Choline	2% 11.1 mg
Vitamin C	3% 2.3 mg
Vitamin E	1% 0.12 mg
Vitamin K	3% 3.5 μg
Minerals	Quantity %DV^{†}
Calcium	5% 62 mg
Copper	30% 0.27 mg
Iron	10% 1.8 mg
Magnesium	9% 36 mg
Phosphorus	8% 98 mg
Potassium	25% 744 mg
Selenium	1% 0.6 μg
Sodium	1% 26 mg
Zinc	3% 0.36 mg
- Other constituents: Quantity
- Water: 15.5 g
- Link to USDA Database entry
- ^{†}Percentages estimated using US recommendations for adults, except for potassium, which is estimated based on expert recommendation from the National Academies.

== Production ==
Estimated global production of raisins in 2023–24 was 1.1 million tonnes, led by Turkey, China, Iran, and the United States as the largest producers.

== Nutrition ==
Raisins are 15% water, 79% carbohydrates (including 4% fiber), and 3% protein, and contain negligible fat (table). In a reference amount of 100 grams (3.5 oz), raisins supply 299 kilocalories and moderate amounts (10–19% DV) of the Daily Value (DV) of riboflavin, vitamin B6, and several dietary minerals rich in content (above 20% DV), including potassium and copper (table).

== Toxicity in animals ==
Raisins can cause kidney failure in both cats and dogs. The cause of this is not known.

== Gallery ==
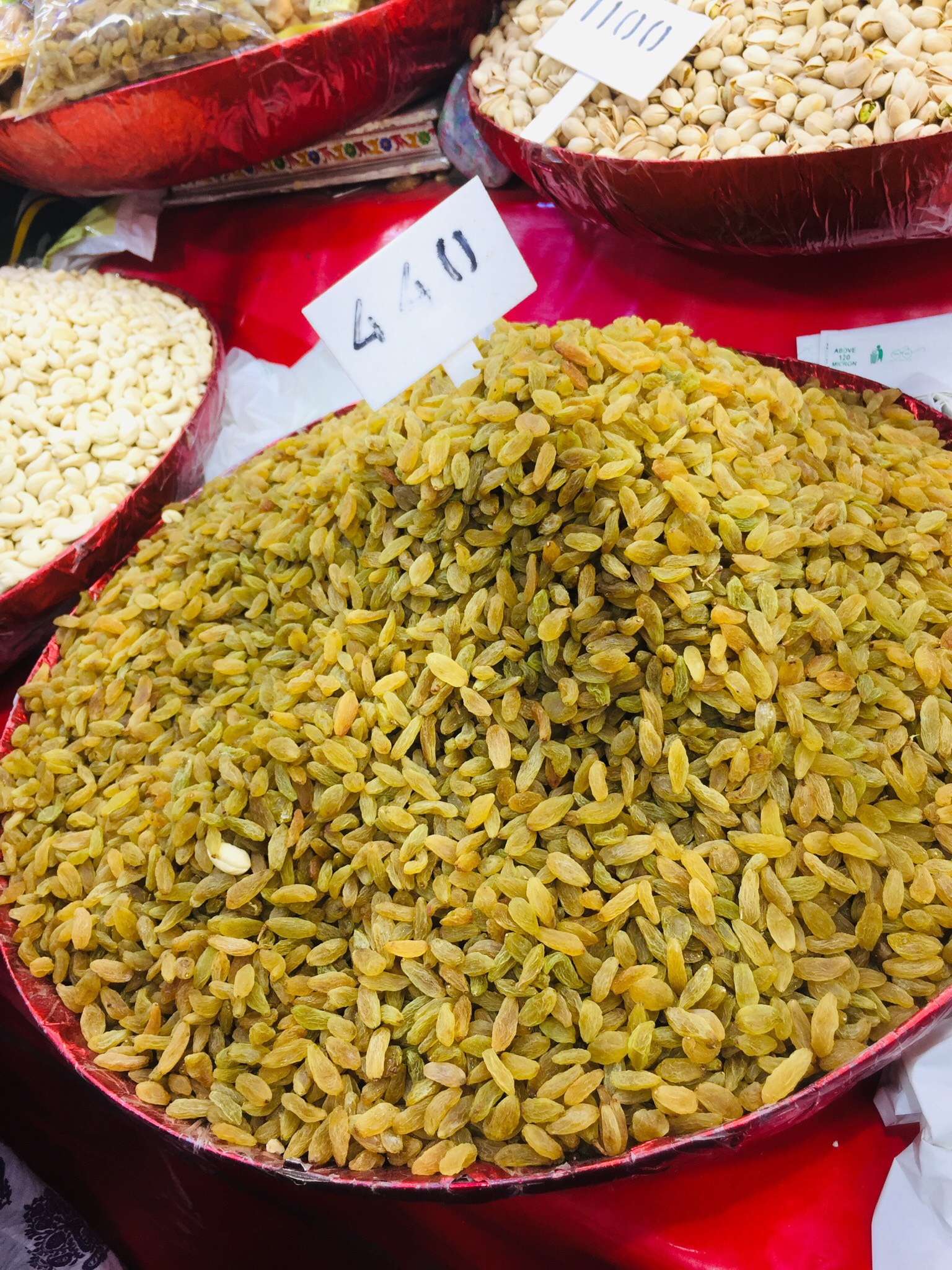
Raisin sale at khari baoli market, Delhi

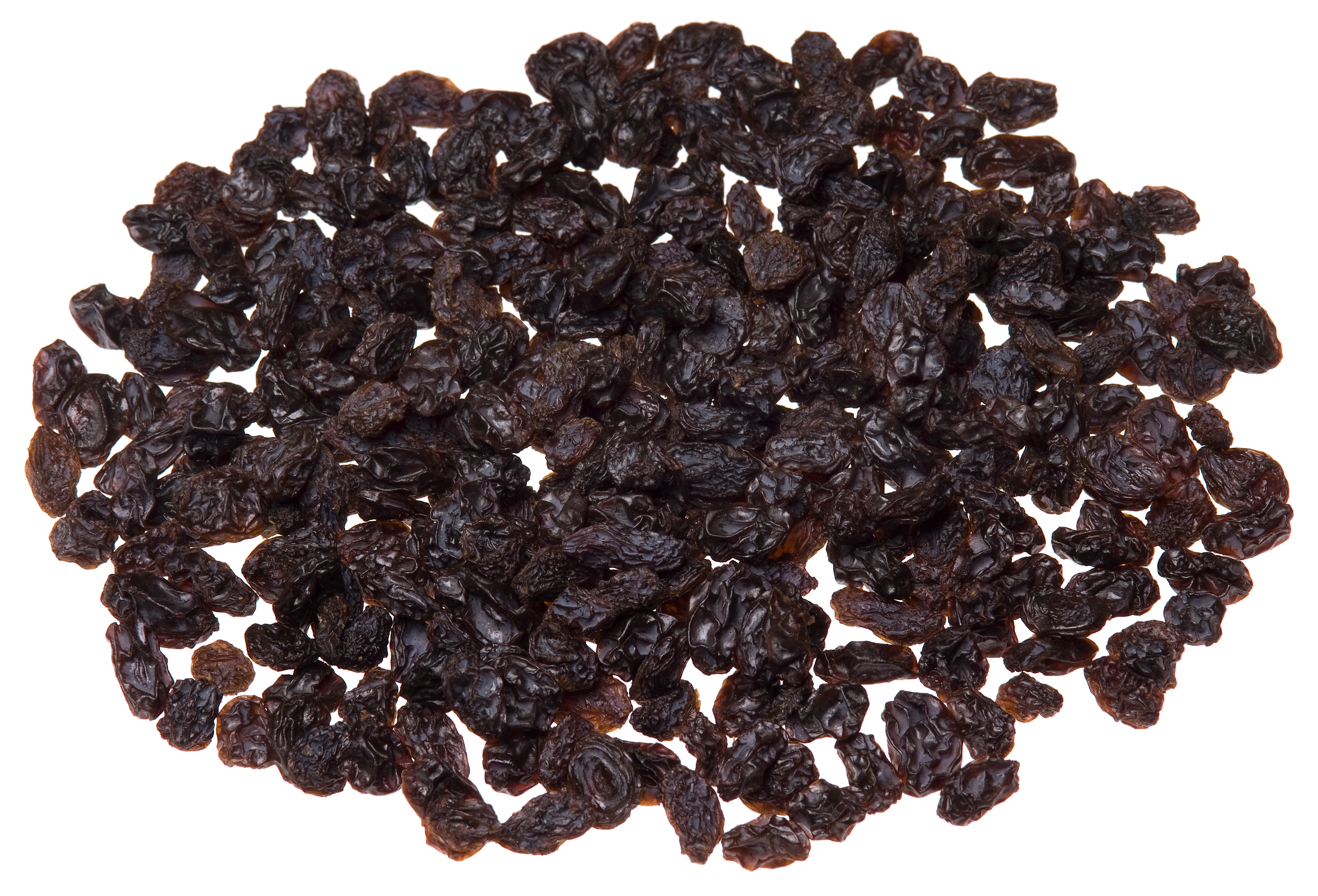
Common commercial raisins

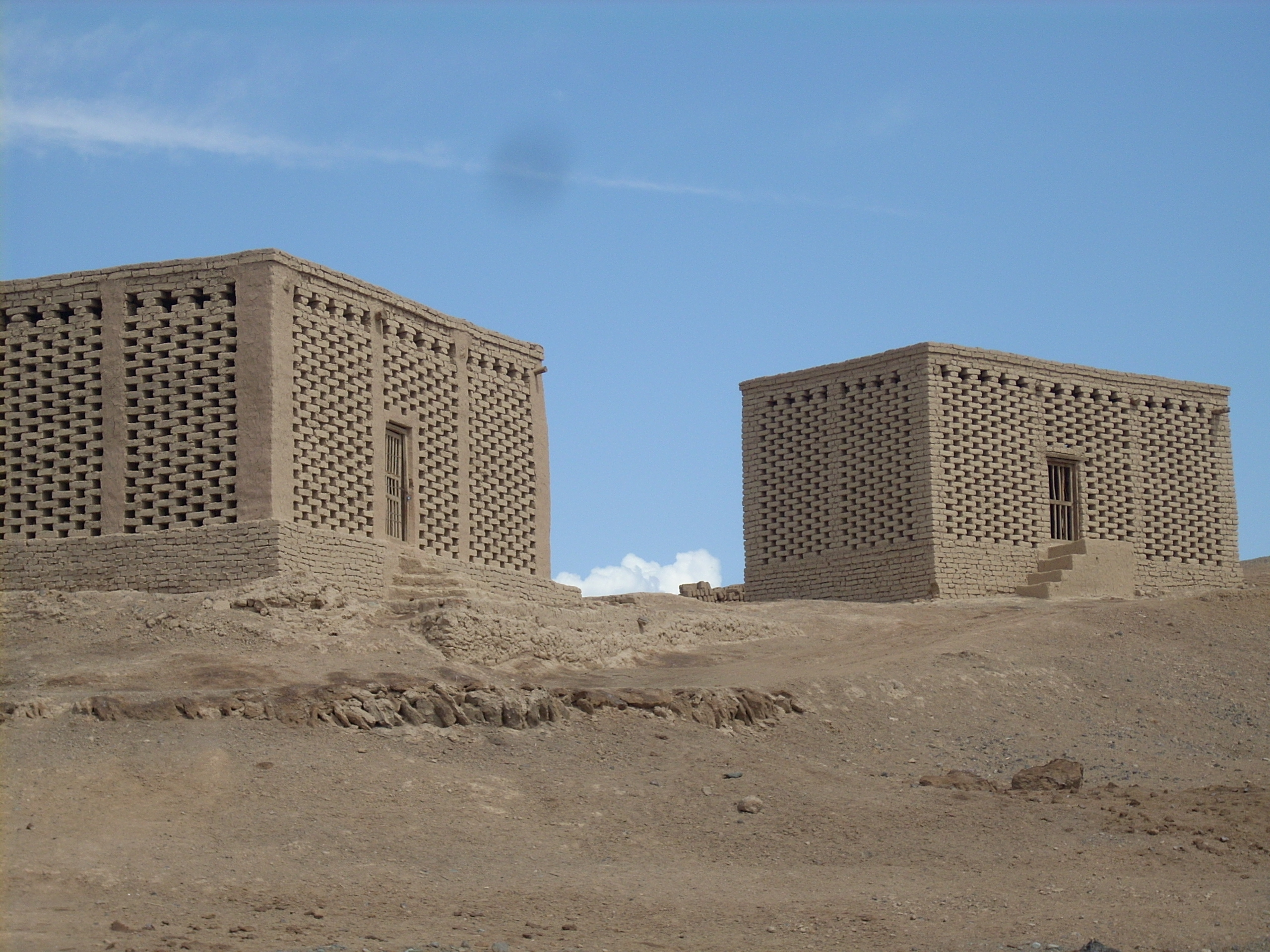
Chunche, ventilated sheds for drying grapes into raisins in Xinjiang

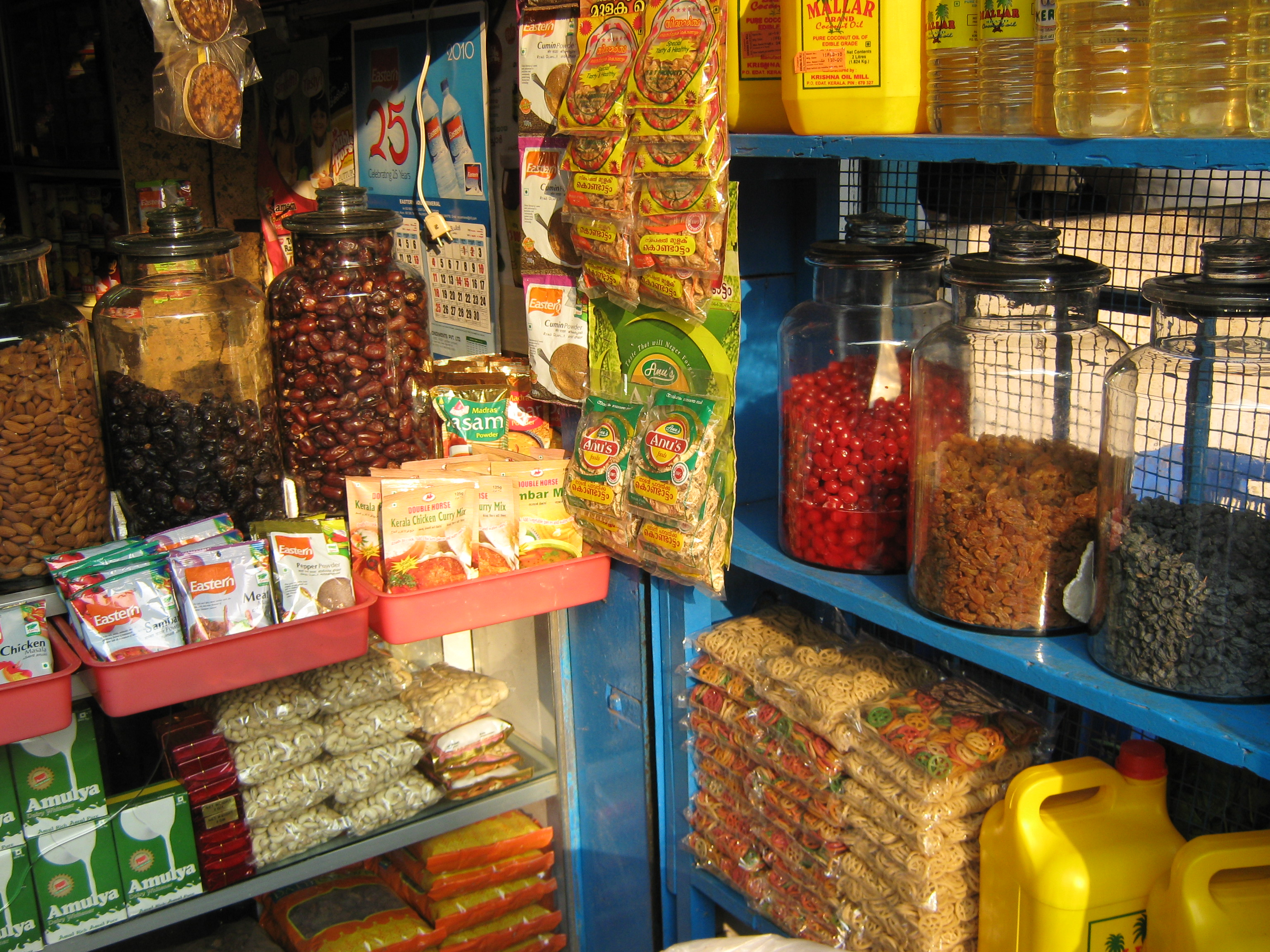
Raisins offered for sale at a market in Taliparamba, India

== See also ==
- Dried fruit
- Raisin cake
- Snap-dragon, a Victorian parlour game that involved raisins being plucked from a bowl of burning brandy
- Sun-Maid, a popular brand of raisins available in North America and the United Kingdom
- The California Raisins, a fictional music group of anthropomorphized raisins created by CalRAB to promote the food on TV
- The chocolate-covered raisin, a candy made by coating the dried fruit in chocolate
- Oatmeal raisin cookie
