= Mark Gustafson =

American animator and film director (1959–2024)

- Gustafson at the 37th Annie Awards in 2010
- Born: September 19, 1959; Portland, Oregon, U.S.
- Died: February 1, 2024 (aged 64)
- Occupation(s): Animator, film director
- Notable work: Guillermo del Toro's Pinocchio

Mark Gustafson (September 19, 1959 – February 1, 2024) was an American animator and film director, best known for co-directing Guillermo del Toro's Pinocchio (2022), which won Best Animated Feature at the 95th Academy Awards.

== Life and career ==
Gustafson began his stop-motion animation career at Will Vinton Studios in the 1980s, working on projects including A Claymation Christmas Celebration, Meet the Raisins!, and The PJs.

He was the animation director of Fantastic Mr. Fox.

Gustafson died of a heart attack on February 1, 2024, at the age of 64.

== Accolades ==
He won Best Animated Feature at the 95th Academy Awards for co-directing Guillermo del Toro's Pinocchio, sharing the award with Guillermo del Toro, Gary Ungar, and Alex Bulkley.

== Filmography ==
- The Adventures of Mark Twain (1985)
- Claymation Easter (1992)
- The PJs (1999)
- Fantastic Mr. Fox (2009)
- Guillermo del Toro's Pinocchio (2022)
