= A Claymation Christmas Celebration =

1987 American television Christmas special

- Opening Titles
- Written by: Ralph Liddle
- Directed by: Will Vinton
- Starring: Tim Conner; Johnny Counterfit
- Music by: Patric Miller
- Country of origin: United States
- Original language: English

Production
- Executive producer: Will Vinton
- Producer: David Altschul
- Running time: 24 minutes

Original release
- Network: CBS
- Release: December 21, 1987

Will Vinton's Claymation Christmas Celebration is an animated Christmas television special originally broadcast on the American CBS TV network on December 21, 1987. The special featured stop motion clay animation and was produced and directed by Will Vinton. The special debuted alongside A Garfield Christmas and the two continued to be aired back to back in subsequent years.

== Synopsis ==
The special is co-hosted by Rex (Johnny Counterfit), an erudite Tyrannosaurus rex, and Herb (Tim Conner), a dimwitted and bespectacled Styracosaurus with a gluttonous appetite. The two appeared in previous Will Vinton videos dating back to 1980 including Dinosaur, but this Christmas special is the first in which they have dialogue and contemporary personalities, vaguely parodying Siskel and Ebert respectively.

Situated in a facsimile of London's Christmas Square, Rex and Herb introduce several stand-alone videos of Christmas carols and holiday standards and discuss the origins of each song relating to different holiday traditions around the world.

Among the musical performances:

- The Biblical Magi (Dan Sachs, Jim Steinberger, Pat Harryman) sing the verses of "We Three Kings" traditionally, while their camels (Ron Tinsley, Patric J. Miller) sing the chorus in the style of doo-wop.
- At Notre Dame Cathedral, The Paris Bell-Harmonic, a group of anthropomorphic church bells who strike their own heads with chime hammers to achieve their respective notes, performs "Carol of the Bells". The low C bell (the tonic) (Tim Conner) constantly dawdles, chimes out of tune and loses his mallet, enraging the maestro, Quasimodo (Johnny Counterfeit), who uses a slingshot on the bell to get the proper tone at the end. announcer: Craig Bartlett other bells: Patric J. Miller
- A children's choir sings "O Christmas Tree", with the video depicting various scenes taking place inside of Christmas ornaments.
- "Angels We Have Heard On High" is set to a walrus couple doing an interpretive ice ballet while several luckless penguins watch.
- At a black church in the countryside, a soul/jazz hybrid rendition of "Joy to the World" plays out in colorful scenes. (This segment, using stylized, flat animation resembling paintings and stained glass windows, is the only segment not rendered in Vinton's trademark Claymation.) Featured vocals: Ron Tinsley, Backing vocals: Patric J. Miller
- The California Raisins perform "Rudolph the Red-Nosed Reindeer," in the style of The Temptations, after they miss the last bus out of town Christmas Eve following a concert—and fly off in the style of Santa Claus's reindeer into the night.

Throughout the program, Rex futilely attempts to clarify the true pronunciation and meaning of the term "wassail', featured in the Christmas carol "Here We Come A-Wassailing". As the show progresses, Rex is accosted by different groups, all singing parodies of the song.

- "Here We Come A-Waffling", by a kennel of dogs selling waffles from a vendor's wagon.
- "Here We Come A-Waddling", by a gaggle of straggling geese carrying baskets of goodies.
- "Here We Come A-Wallowing", by a herd of slovenly pigs on a John Deere-style field wagon gorging themselves on an abundance of assorted fruits.

Rex is convinced that his own pronunciation is correct, but he is continually questioned by the others, including Herb, when the latter is not busy excessively partaking of the various Christmas treats offered by each group; consulting the dictionary provides no meaningful help. Finally, near the program's end, a large truck loaded with cider-swilling Irish elves arrives in Christmas Square singing the correct version of the carol, validating Rex's theory much to his delight. When asked, one of the townies explains the real meaning of wassailing: going around the neighborhood singing Christmas carols, and getting treats and cordials.

At the end, the entire cast performs "Here We Come A-Wassailing", and then "We Wish You a Merry Christmas" as the end credits roll.

== Production ==
Filming took place in Portland, Oregon.

== Awards ==
1988—Primetime Emmy Award for Outstanding Animated Program given to Will Vinton (executive producer/director), David Altschul (producer) and Ralph Liddle (writer)

== Soundtrack and video ==
A companion soundtrack album was released by Atlantic Records in 1988 and was originally available on LP, cassette, and compact disc. The album contains six songs not featured on the special, including an alternate version of "Angels We Have Heard On High". The song "O Christmas Tree", as featured in the special, was excluded from the soundtrack.

The special was released on the Hen's Tooth Video DVD Will Vinton's Claymation Christmas Plus Halloween & Easter Celebrations in 2003.

=== Track list ===
Track No.	Song	Performed by	Songwriter(s)
1	"Rudolph the Red-Nosed Reindeer"	The Streetcorner Singers	Johnny Marks
2	"Good King Swing"	Ron Tinsley, Patric J. Miller	P. Miller (John Mason Neale)
3	"We Three Kings Bop"	Dan Sachs, Jim Steinberger, Pat Harryman, Tinsley, P. Miller	P. Miller (John Henry Hopkins, Jr.)
4	"God Rest Ye"	Calvin Walker	P. Miller (traditional)
5	"Silent Night Jazzy Night"	Linda Hornbuckle	P. Miller (F. X. Gruber)
6	"Carol of the Bells"	Craig Bartlett, Johnny Counterfit, Tim Conner, P. Miller	M. Leontovich, P.J. Wilhousky
7	"Noel"	John Koonce, Marilyn Keller	P. Miller (traditional)
8	"Hark!"	Tinsley, Keller	P. Miller (Charles Wesley, George Whitefield, Felix Mendelssohn)
9	"Up on the Housetop"	Jane Satem, P. Miller	P. Miller (Benjamin Hanby)
10	"Joy!"	Tinsley, P. Miller	P. Miller (Isaac Watts, Lowell Mason)
11	"Waffle, Waddle, Wallow, Wassle"	Conner, Counterfit, Sachs, Reid Stewart, Greg Black, Miller, Will Vinton, Roxy Ragozzino, Bernadette Caughlin, Deborah Miller, Doug Aberle	P. Miller (traditional)
12	"Angels We Have Heard on High"	Keller, Tinsley, Lea Jones	P. Miller (James Chadwick)

Patric J. Miller was granted songwriting credit on all ten songs that were in the public domain at the time, without regard to their actual authors. "Carol of the Bells" includes a credit to its lyricist Wilhousky, though none of his lyrics are used in the recording. Actual songwriters, who were uncredited on the album, are identified in parentheses in the above table.

Musicians:

- Patric J. Miller: keyboards, bass guitar, drums, programming
- Terry Robb: guitar on "Noel"
- Bill Barnett: bass on "Noel"
- Jeff Horman: sax on "Noel" and "Hark"
- Don Latarski: guitar on "God Rest Ye"
- Warren Rand: sax on "Joy"
- Julia Heydon: crum horn on "Wassle"
- Jesse Gram: tuba on "Wassle"

== See also ==
- Claymation Easter
- List of Christmas films
