= Claymation Easter =

1992 short film by Will Vinton

- Screenplay by: Barry Bruce; Mark Gustafson; Ryan Holznagel
- Story by: Barry Bruce; James Mangold; Will Vinton
- Directed by: Mark Gustafson
- Voices of: Tim Conner; Jim Cummings
- Composer: Mark Mothersbaugh
- Country of origin: United States
- Original language: English

Production
- Executive producer: Will Vinton
- Producer: Paul Diener
- Editor: Scott Sundholm
- Running time: 23 minutes
- Production company: Will Vinton Productions

Original release
- Network: CBS
- Release: April 19, 1992

Claymation Easter is a 1992 stop-motion animated short film by Will Vinton. The Easter-themed special won an Emmy for Outstanding Animated Program. The special aired on CBS on April 19, 1992.

== Plot ==
A pig named Wilshire tries to run field tests on a new shark-proof diving suit, using another pig, Vince, and a live shark as his test subjects. After the shark swallows Vince whole, Wilshire considers the test results "inconclusive".

Later, Wilshire, looking at his $1.5 million electricity bill, listens to an interview with the Easter Bunny on the radio. As the host, Spike Rabbit, takes questions from callers, one listener asks the Easter Bunny why he turned down a $5 million endorsement deal for tennis shoes. Wilshire's ears perk up and he calls the station, posing as "Barbara", to ask for more details. The Easter Bunny answers, saying his position is an ancient and sacred trust, refusing to violate it. Intrigued, "Barbara" calls in to ask what would happen if something tragic befell the Easter Bunny, and who would replace him.

Wilshire learns that, according to ancient customs, a new Easter Bunny would be chosen by a contest of champions. Armed with this information, Wilshire hatches a plan to eliminate the Easter Bunny and inherit his position, becoming an "Easter Pig". The next morning, he disguises himself as a salesman for vacuum cleaners, enters the Easter Bunny's cottage, and cranks up his vacuum cleaner, sucking up everything inside the house, including the Easter Bunny himself.

That night, news breaks over the radio that the Easter Bunny is missing and that, if he is not found by Friday, an Easter Race will be held to determine a replacement. Wilshire turns to Spike for help. Wearing a cyan rabbit costume, Wilshire claims that he is a "rabbit trapped in a pig's body" and "wants to come out of the carrot patch" by Friday. Spike agrees to an aggressive transition plan involving reading, harvesting carrots, and freeway crossing—the last of which proves to be Wilshire's weakness as he is repeatedly pummeled by a speeding vehicle as soon as he steps into the roadway. After three collisions, Wilshire recovers in his workshop, where Spike finds the Easter Bunny. To prevent Spike from exposing this secret, Wilshire springs a trapdoor, sending both Spike and the Easter Bunny into a pit.

The Easter Race is held at a large stadium, where Wilshire discovers no rule limiting the competition to rabbits and thus threatens to call the ACLU; organizers, fearing a lawsuit, let Wilshire participate. Meanwhile, Spike and the Easter Bunny are suspended over the shark tank until the shark jumps up and swallows the two rabbits whole. They find Vince, alive and well, playing solitaire.

Phase One of the Easter Race begins and involves hatching an Easter Egg. Wilshire sits on his egg like the other contestants, but grows impatient with the recalcitrant chick. He uses a bomb to force the egg open, taking out a couple of rivals. The crowd boos at Wilshire's victory.

In the shark's belly, Vince suggests building a fire like in Pinocchio as a way of getting out, but Spike points out the excess of stomach acid would be dangerous if lit. Spike soon gets an idea to give the shark an upset stomach by singing "Release Me", which causes the shark to start sobbing and crying.

Wilshire makes it to Phase Two of the Easter Race, which involves delivering eggs to cardboard cutouts of children. While the other rabbits start up their mopeds, Wilshire uses a modified lowrider (unveiled to the song of the same name) with mechanical arms and legs, crushing any competitors that get in the way and injuring others. Wilshire wins again only because he is the last contestant left standing, much to the dismay of the crowd.

The Third and Final Phase of the Easter Race involves Freeway Crossing on a fake freeway. Unlike during his transition, no cars arrive when Wilshire steps into the road, and with no remaining competitors, he easily crosses to victory. He ecstatically breaks into a vulgar victory dance, enduring massive booing from the crowd. As Wilshire gestures crudely, the shark, moved by Spike's singing, spits out the three animals up into the air, sending them right into the amphitheater, and the Easter Bunny lands on the throne before Wilshire can sit down. Wilshire, attempting to disclaim wrongdoing, backs into the fake freeway and is immediately run over by a truck. Spike leads the crowd in a rendition of the Hallelujah chorus as the Easter Bunny wishes everyone a Happy Easter.

During the end credits, one of the rats from Wilshire's lab playfully scurries around one of the bunny guards from the amphitheater, before biting the guard's leg, and the guard's scream can be heard off camera as the Will Vinton Productions logo is shown.

== Cast ==
- Tim Conner as Vince Pig
- Jim Cummings as Dr. Spike Rabbit, Stadium Announcer
- Michele Mariana as Wilshire Pig, Radio Reporter
- Todd Tolces as Easter Bunny, Judges

== See also ==
- A Claymation Christmas Celebration
- List of Easter television episodes
