= Dinosaur (1980 film) =

1980 short film

- Directed by: Will Vinton
- Written by: Susan Shadburne
- Produced by: Will Vinton
- Starring: Michele Mariana
- Animation by: Barry Bruce; Joan C. Gratz; Don Merkt; Matt Wuerker
- Production companies: Will Vinton Productions; Pyramid Films
- Distributed by: Pyramid Films
- Release date: July 18, 1980
- Running time: 14 minutes
- Country: United States
- Language: English

Dinosaurs!
- VHS cover
- Written by: Virginia Theimer Clapper
- Produced by: Dick Baka; Jim Bousa
- Starring: Fred Savage
- Cinematography: Rich Ball; Charles Peich
- Edited by: Suzanne Rosen
- Music by: Charmer
- Distributed by: GoldenVision
- Release date: November 20, 1987
- Running time: 30 minutes
- Country: United States
- Language: English

Dinosaur is an animated short film directed and produced by Will Vinton.

In 1987, the film was edited into Festival of Claymation as the sixth segment, and then later extended and released on video under the title Dinosaurs!. The new footage stars Fred Savage playing a grade school student named Philip who gives a class report on dinosaurs, with the help of an animated chalkboard and Will Vinton's claymation dinosaurs.

== Plot ==
The video - with beginning scenes filmed in 1987 - begins with a young boy named Phillip (played by Fred Savage) sitting in his bedroom, listening to loud music, and struggling to find an idea for a class report on a science topic. While struggling to find some ideas, and irking his mother (who threatens to call his father if he does not turn off the music and go to bed) with his loud music, he plays a song on his boombox (titled "Mesozoic Mind"), and the song provides him with an inspiration for his report: DINOSAURS!

Philip then goes to sleep and has a dream, where he discovers that the search for the truth about these magnificent animals and their astonishing 160-million-year success on Earth is probably the most fascinating speculation there is. Phillip then finishes his report and presents it to the class. The class report is then covered through the 1980 claymation short Dinosaur by Will Vinton Productions.

== Background ==
Originally created in 1980, when it was known more simply as Dinosaur, the 17-minute claymation short by Vinton Productions would later be used for this 1987 video. The popular short is also played at the Smithsonian Museum and has won numerous awards. This film is also played in Rocky Hill, Connecticut at the museum in Dinosaur State Park. It is also played at the Pacific Science Center (in Seattle, Washington) in the Dinosaurs A Journey Through Time exhibit, but cuts out the first two parts and narrows it down to the claymation dinosaur story.

Dinosaurs! was designed as an educational film for young children new to the world of prehistoric life; the video slipsleeve describes the film with "Discover the real monsters who dominated the earth for millions of years!" The cartoon animation of the chalkboard is used to elaborate on attributes such as the extinction of the dinosaurs as well as their brain capacity, while the Vinton claymation illustrates, in a colorful and simplistic manner, the brutal lives of the many dinosaurs. The film also introduces a music video for the song "Mesozoic Mind" by Charmer, featuring cartoon anthropomorphic Mesozoic era dinosaurs performing it.

== Awards ==
- Chicago International Film Festival, 1980
- Gold Hugo
- Gold Award, WorldFest-Houston International Film Festival, 1980

== See also ==
- List of films featuring dinosaurs
- Wallace & Gromit
- Gumby
