= Will Vinton =

American animator (1947-2018)

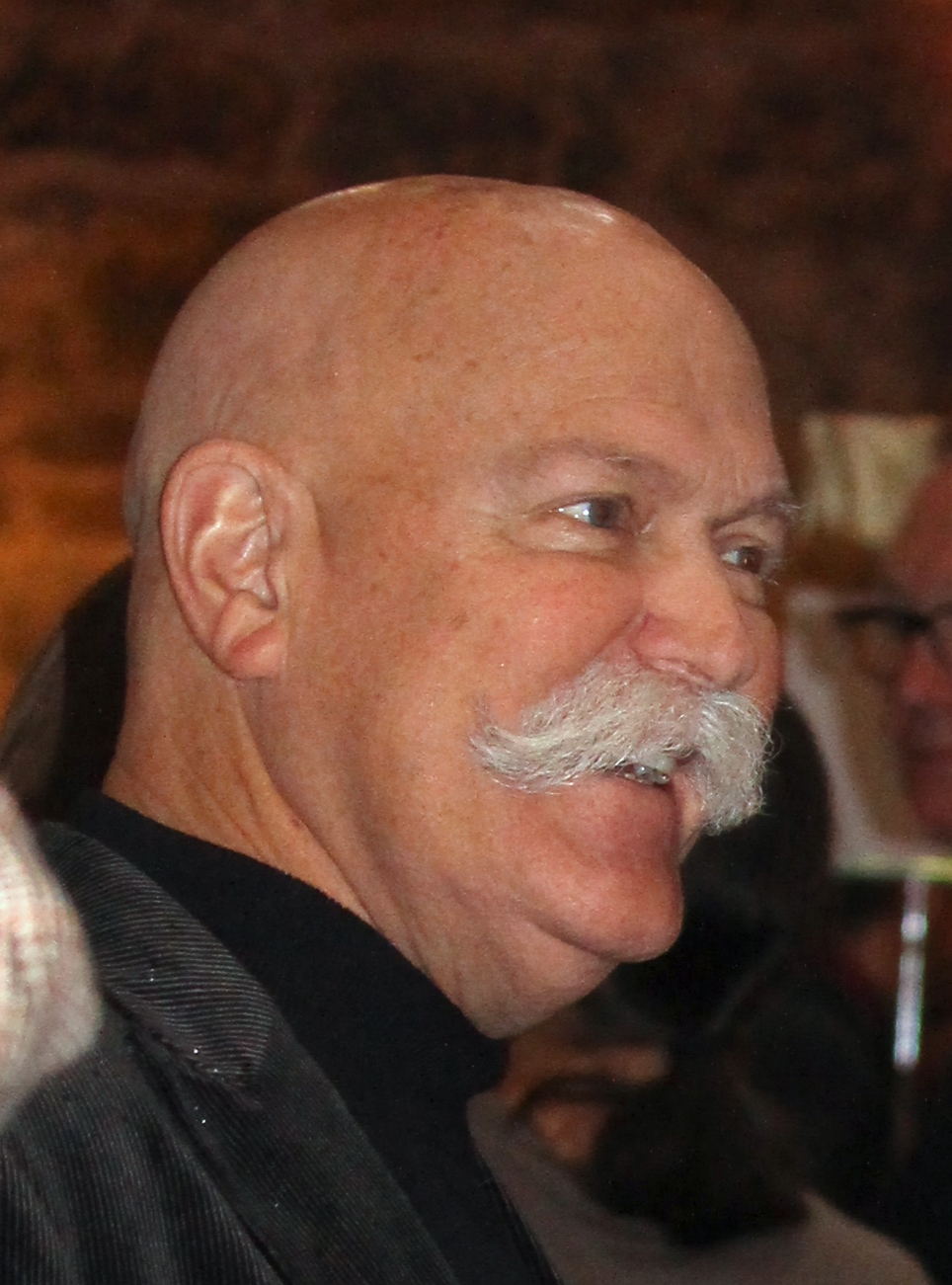
- Vinton in 2015
- Born: William Gale Vinton; November 17, 1947; McMinnville, Oregon, U.S.
- Died: October 4, 2018 (aged 70); Portland, Oregon, U.S.
- Occupations: Animator; filmmaker; editor; screenwriter; voice actor
- Years active: 1969–2014
- Children: 3

William Gale Vinton (November 17, 1947 – October 4, 2018) was an American animator and filmmaker. Vinton was best known for his Claymation work, alongside creating iconic characters such as The California Raisins. He was nominated for five Academy Awards, winning once. He also accepted several Emmy and Clio Awards for his studio's work.

== Life and education ==
Vinton was born on November 17, 1947, to a car dealer father and a bookkeeper mother in McMinnville, Oregon. His paternal grandfather, William T. Vinton, was a well known state senator in Oregon, representing Portland.

During the 1960s, Vinton studied physics, architecture and filmmaking at the University of California, Berkeley, where he was influenced by the work of Antoni Gaudí. During this time, Vinton made a feature-length documentary film about the California counter-culture movement titled Gone for a Better Deal, which toured college campuses in various film festivals of the time. Two more films about student protest followed, Berkeley Games and First Ten Days, as well as a narrative short Reply, and his first animation, Culture Shock.

Vinton received his bachelor's degree in architecture from UC Berkeley in 1970.

== Career ==
=== Collaboration with Bob Gardiner ===
Meeting clay animator Bob Gardiner in the Berkeley, California area in the early 1970s, Vinton brought him to Portland and they commandeered Vinton's home basement to make a quick 1½-minute test film of clay animation (and the supporting armatures) called Wobbly Wino, completed in early 1973. Gardiner refined his sculpting and animation techniques while Vinton built a system for animating his Bolex Rex-5 16mm camera and they began work in mid-1973 on an 8-minute 16mm short film about a drunk wino who stumbles into a closed art museum and interacts with the paintings and sculptures. Completed in late 1974 after 14 months of production, the film combined Gardiner's sculpting skills and comedy writing talent with Vinton's camera skills. Closed Mondays won an Academy Award for Best Animated Short Film in the spring of 1975, the first film produced in Portland to do so.

Vinton and Gardiner parted ways during the production of their second short film, Mountain Music completed by Vinton in 1976. Gardiner focused on producing PSA spots for local political issues (eventually evolving into other artistic media such as music and holograms) while Vinton established Will Vinton Productions (later Will Vinton Studios) in Portland to capitalize on the animation technology Gardiner had developed for their animated short Closed Mondays. Quickly expanding his studio by hiring new animators, Vinton produced dozens of commercials for regional and then national companies.

== Will Vinton Studios ==
Will Vinton Studios
- Type: Animation Studio
- Industry: Film, Entertainment, Advertising
- Founded: 1975; 51 years ago
- Founder: Will Vinton
- Defunct: 2005; 21 years ago
- Fate: Became Laika
- Successors: Free Will Entertainment; Laika
- Headquarters: Portland, Oregon

=== Going solo ===
Still with only a handful of animators, Vinton produced a trilogy of 27-minute films of a short stories like fairy tales in the late 1970s and early 1980s, such as Martin the Cobbler (1977), the Oscar-nominated Rip Van Winkle (1978), and The Little Prince (1979). These films were later released theatrically under the umbrella title Trilogy, and later to video as The Little Prince and Friends. In 1978, Vinton produced the documentary Claymation: Three Dimensional Clay Animation a 17-minute film featuring the behind-the-scenes technical processes used. The term "claymation" was later trademarked by Vinton,.

=== 35mm years ===
Graduating to 35mm film, Vinton produced other short films during this time: Legacy (1979), Dinosaur (1980), The Creation (directed by Joan Gratz, 1981, Academy Award nominee), The Great Cognito (directed by Barry Bruce, 1982, Academy Award nominee), A Christmas Gift, and the music video Vanz Kant Danz (1987) for Creedence Clearwater Revival's John Fogerty. VHS video compilations of these films were released in the 1980s as Festival of Claymation and Son of Combo II.

Vinton, no longer performing animation himself, later produced special effects scenes for TV shows and movies, including a sequence for Bette Midler's Divine Madness! movie (1980), an Emmy-winning sequence for the Moonlighting TV series (1987), and the opening and closing title sequences for the feature comedy film Brain Donors (1992). His company's animation effects for Disney's Return to Oz (1985) were also nominated for the Academy Award for Special Effects. In May 1985, Will Vinton Productions released their first and only theatrical film The Adventures of Mark Twain.

Following his work on Return to Oz, Vinton was hired by the Disney studio to produce animation effects for their Michael Jackson Disneyland-EPCOT Center film, Captain EO in 1986 and the Speed Demon music video for Michael Jackson's musical anthology feature-length film, Moonwalker (1988). Prominent among his hundreds of now international commercial creations were the California Raisins, the Domino's Pizza Noid, and the M&M's Red, Yellow, Blue, Green and Crispy (Orange) characters.

The California Raisins' first big hit was the song "I Heard It Through the Grapevine" in the first of their series of TV spots for the California Raisin Advisory Board. They became such a media phenomenon that they went on to star in their own pair of primetime specials for CBS television, Meet the Raisins (1988), The Raisins Sold Out (1990), and a cel-animated show, The California Raisins Show. A couple of music albums of songs from the specials, produced by Nu Shooz pop rock band leader John Smith were also released.

CBS also commissioned three more prime-time specials, Will Vinton's Claymation Christmas Celebration (1987), Claymation Comedy of Horrors (1991), and Claymation Easter (1992). Will Vinton's Claymation Christmas Celebration and Claymation Easter won a Primetime Emmy Award for Outstanding Animated Program. Claymation Comedy of Horrors was nominated for this category, but lost to The Simpsons. All were later released to video and DVD.

In the 1990s, a variety of Vinton's 400+ animators and technicians helped with new creations and films of their own using the Vinton facilities called the Walkabout Program. Craig Bartlett created his short film Arnold Escapes From Church (1988) and produced two more clay-animated short films, The Arnold Waltz (1990) and Arnold Rides a Chair (1991), the latter of which was featured on Sesame Street; these shorts would later spawn Hey Arnold!, a cel-animated series for Nickelodeon in 1996.

=== Computer animation ===
The mid-1990s also saw Vinton adding computer animation to his output, used most visibly for his M&M's character commercials. A short CGI film, Fluffy, directed by Doug Aberle, was created during this time. Other CGI films—some combined with clay and stop-motion animation—soon followed. Vinton contributed to a consumer-grade computer animation application called Playmation, developed by Hash, Inc., a computer animation company in Vancouver, Washington.

In 1997, Brandon Tartikoff—in what would be his last substantial contribution to television before his death that year—commissioned Vinton to create a Christmas special, The Online Adventures of Ozzie the Elf. Ozzie the Elf was originally created as a mascot for America Online's holiday portal, which Tartikoff (who was working for AOL at the time) saw as a potential crossover property. Vinton had high hopes that the special, which was animated in Claymation, would become a perennially rerun special.

=== Switch from Claymation to Foamation ===
During the late 1990s and early 2000s, the Vinton Studios produced the animated series The PJs for the FOX TV network. The series was conceived and executive-produced by actor and comedian Eddie Murphy. Another animated series was produced for the UPN TV network by the Vinton studio, Gary and Mike. Gary and Mike was shot using digital video capture system developed for the production by two Vinton engineers Miegel Ginsberg and Gary McRobert. Both series used a refinement in Vinton's style of dimensional animation. Most of the clay figures were replaced by models of moulded foam rubber, eliminating many of the limitations and maintenance issues inherent to polymer clay, the management techniques for which had been pushed to their limits by Vinton and his technical team. Vinton soon coined a new term for this process, Foamation. The studio also produced an unaired pilot for Slacker Cats in 2001.

=== Decline and hostile takeover by the Knights ===
By the end of the 1990s, the Vinton studio, seeking funds for more feature-length films, had become big enough to bring in outside investors, which included Nike, Inc., founder Phil Knight and his son, Travis, who had worked at the studio as an animator.

In spring of 2001, the studio's animated shows, The PJs and Gary and Mike, were cancelled, with the latter only airing 13 episodes.

In 2002, Vinton lost control of the studio he founded after Knight became the majority shareholder and Vinton failed to garner funds for further feature production in Los Angeles, eventually being dismissed from the studio. Vinton later sought damages for this and sued for ownership of his name. In 2005, Will Vinton Studios was rebranded as Laika. Premiere stop-motion animator/director Henry Selick joined the studio as a supervising director. The rebranded studio went on to produce critically acclaimed stop-motion features Coraline, ParaNorman, The Boxtrolls, Kubo and the Two Strings, Missing Link, and Wildwood.

=== Aftermath ===
Vinton later founded a new production facility, Will Vinton's Free Will Entertainment, also based in Portland. In 2005, Vinton produced The Morning After, the first short film under the new company. The film combines CGI and live action. He also taught at the Portland branch of The Art Institutes and maintained an office there as an artist in residence. In a 2013 interview he said he was working on some projects, calling one of them a retro project, and another was named Azumma, a co-production South Korean H Culture Studio, but it never materialized. Vinton created a musical titled The Kiss, an adaptation of The Frog Prince with music by David Pomeranz that premiered on March 24, 2014, in Lake Oswego, Oregon. The Creative Artists Agency in Beverly Hills represented Vinton for production projects, which included a graphic novel called Jack Hightower produced in tandem with Dark Horse Comics.

== Illness, retirement, and death ==
In 2006, Vinton was diagnosed with multiple myeloma and retired in 2008 from producing films. He died in Portland, Oregon, on October 4, 2018, after a 12-year battle with the disease at the age of 70. He was the subject of the documentary film Claydream, which was directed by Marq Evans and released at the 2021 Tribeca Film Festival. His family hosted a celebration of life for him at No Vacancy Lounge in Portland on October 21, 2018.

== Archive ==
The moving image collection of Will Vinton is housed at the Academy Film Archive. The Academy Film Archive has preserved several of Vinton's films, including Closed Mondays, The Creation, The Great Cognito, Dinosaur, Legacy, and A Christmas Gift.

== Work ==
=== Feature films ===
- Gone for a Better Deal (1974) – director, producer (live-action documentary)
- Return to Oz (1985) – claymation director (Academy Award nominee)
- The Adventures of Mark Twain (1985) – director, producer (Comet Quest: UK: video title)
- Shadow Play (1986) – producer (live-action thriller)
- Festival of Claymation (1987) – director, producer (compilation of short films)
- Moonwalker (1988) – segment director, producer: Speed Demon by Michael Jackson
- Brain Donors (1992) – segment director (intro and outro)
- The Wild (2006) – executive producer

=== TV series ===
- The California Raisin Show, TV Series 23:00 × 13 (executive producer)
- Klay's TV, TV series pilot (director, executive producer)
- 5 Cecille shorts for Sesame Street, 1:30 min. (producer)
- Adventures in Wonderland (Caterpillar's Stories), 4 min. × 30 (executive producer)
- Hammer Time short for Sesame Street
- The PJs, TV Series 23:00 × 52 (executive producer) Primetime Emmy Award Winner
- Boyer Brother, TV Series Pilot (executive producer)
- Gary & Mike, TV Series 23:00 × 13 (executive producer) Primetime Emmy Award Nominee
- Slacker Cats, TV Series Pilot (executive producer)

=== TV specials ===
- Will Vinton's Claymation Christmas Celebration (1987), 23 min. (director, producer) Prime-time Emmy Winner
- Meet the Raisins! (1988), 23:00 (executive producer, producer) Prime-time Emmy nominee
- The Raisins: Sold Out! The California Raisins II (1990), 23:00 (director, producer) Prime-time Emmy nominee
- Claymation Comedy of Horrors (1991), 23:00 (executive producer, producer) Prime-time Emmy winner
- Claymation Easter (1992), 23:00 (executive producer, producer) Prime-time Emmy Winner
- The Online Adventures of Ozzie the Elf (1997), 21:30 (animator)

=== Short films ===
- Wobbly Wino, 2 min. (director, producer)
- Culture Shock, 17 min. (co-director, producer)
- Closed Mondays (1974), 9 min. (co-director) Academy Award winner
- Mountain Music (1976), 9 min. (director, producer)
- Martin the Cobbler (1977), 26 min. (director, producer)
- Claymation (1978), documentary, 18 min. (director, producer)
- Rip Van Winkle (1978), 26 min. (director, producer) Academy Award Nominee
- The Little Prince (1979), 25 min. (director, producer)
- Legacy: A Very Short History of Natural Resources\ (1979), 7 min. (director, producer)
- Dinosaur (1980), 17 min. (director, producer)
- The Diary of Adam and Eve (1980) , 24 min. (director, producer)
- A Christmas Gift (1980), 7 min. (director, producer)
- The Creation (1981), 7:36 (director, producer) Academy Award Nominee
- The Great Cognito (1982), 5 min. (director, producer) Academy Award Nominee
- Vanz Kant Danz (John Fogerty music video) (1985), 6 min. (director, producer)
- Speed Demon (Michael Jackson music video) (1988) (director, producer, animation director)
- Mr. Resistor (1994), 8 min. (executive producer)
- Go Down Death (1994), 10 min. (director, producer)
- Zerox and Mylar (1995), 5 min. (executive producer)
- Marvin the Martian in the Third Dimension (1996), 13 min. (producer)
- Bride of Resistor (1997), 6 min. (executive producer)
- The Stars Came Dreaming (1998), 12 min. (executive producer)
- The Lost 'M' Adventure (3-D short film featuring the M&M's characters) (2000), 12 min. (executive producer)
- Día de los Muertos (Day of the Dead) (2002), 8 min. (executive producer)
- The Morning After (2005), 7:30 (director, producer)
- The Martial Artist (2007), 20 min. (director, producer, writer)

=== Musical theatre ===
- The Kiss (2014), (director, producer)
