= California Raisin Advisory Board =

Former state marketing commission

The California Raisin Advisory Board (or CALRAB) was a California state marketing commission based in Fresno, California that was created in the mid-1900s to coordinate the regulation and promotion of the state's raisin crop. The group became most noted from 1986 to 1994 for developing an international advertising campaign using The California Raisins claymation characters. The California Raisin campaign was funded by an initial grant of US$3 million from the United States Department of Agriculture. Although popular with the public, the California Raisin campaign eventually failed because its production cost the raisin growers almost twice their earnings. CALRAB was closed on July 31, 1994, after the success of the campaign had triggered a vicious cycle: because it was a nonprofit organization and could not profit from the California Raisins, CALRAB chose to divert earnings from the campaign to fund more advertisements, thereby increasing costs until members revolted. Following the board's collapse, the California Raisins became (intellectual) property of the state of California. In 1998, the California Raisin Marketing Board, funded by raisin growers, was established to replace CALRAB as the promotional organization for the raisin crop.
