= Wally Walrus filmography =

Wally Walrus
- Created by: Walter Lantz
- Original work: The Beach Nut (1944)
- Owner: Walter Lantz Productions
- Years: 1944–1965; 1999–2024

Print publications
- Comics: Dell Comics

Films and television
- Film(s): Woody Woodpecker Goes to Camp (2024)
- Short film(s): Woody Woodpecker cartoons
- Web series: Woody Woodpecker (2018–2022)
- Animated series: The Woody Woodpecker Show (1957–1997); The New Woody Woodpecker Show (1999–2003)
- Television special(s): Appearances (from 1944–2024)
- Direct-to-video: List below

This is a list of Walter Lantz "Cartunes" featuring Wally Walrus. Most are entries in Lantz's Woody Woodpecker, but Wally has also appeared in The Overture to William Tell, Dog Tax Dodgers, Kiddie Koncert, Clash and Carry, and Tricky Trout, which are Musical Miniatures, Andy Panda and Chilly Willy cartunes.

Directors for each short are noted. Several Woody Woodpecker cartoons produced in 1951 and 1952 carry no director credit; Walter Lantz claims to have directed these shorts himself. The fifteen cartoons were released in The Woody Woodpecker and Friends Classic Cartoon Collection.

== Released by Universal Pictures ==
=== 1944 ===
(all cartoons directed by James Culhane)

- The Beach Nut
- Ski for Two

=== 1945 ===
(all cartoons directed by James Culhane)

- Chew-Chew Baby
- The Dippy Diplomat

=== 1946 ===
- Bathing Buddies (Dick Lundy)
- The Reckless Driver (Culhane)

=== 1947 ===
(all cartoons directed by Dick Lundy)

- Smoked Hams
- The Overture to William Tell
- Well Oiled

== Released by United Artists ==
=== 1948 ===
(all cartoons directed by Dick Lundy)

- The Mad Hatter
- Banquet Busters
- Kiddie Koncert
- Wacky-Bye Baby
- Dog Tax Dodgers

== Released by Universal International ==
=== 1951 ===
(all cartoons directed by Walter Lantz - no onscreen credit)

- Sleep Happy
- Slingshot 6 7/8
- The Woody Woodpecker Polka

=== 1952 ===
- Stage Hoax (Lantz - no onscreen credit)

=== 1953 ===
(All cartoons directed by Don Patterson)

- What's Sweepin
- Buccaneer Woodpecker
- Operation Sawdust

=== 1961 ===
(all cartoons directed by Jack Hannah)

- Clash and Carry
- Tricky Trout
