= Eric Bauza filmography =

Eric Bauza in 2026

The following is a list of performances done by Canadian actor Eric Bauza (1979–2026), who had done numerous roles across various films, television series, voice work, and video games.

Bauza voiced various Looney Tunes characters, and won three Emmy Awards for his performances in Looney Tunes Cartoons (2020–2024), Bugs Bunny Builders (2022–2025), and Teen Titans Go! (2024). His other major roles in television and film include Belly Bag in Uncle Grandpa (2013–2017), Buhdeuce in Breadwinners (2014–2016), Puss in Boots in The Adventures of Puss in Boots (2015–2018), Baby Fozzie in Muppet Babies (2018–2022), Splinter in Rise of the Teenage Mutant Ninja Turtles (2018–2020), Luke Skywalker in Lego Star Wars, and Woody Woodpecker in Woody Woodpecker (2017) and Woody Woodpecker Goes to Camp (2024).

== Filmography ==
=== Film ===
Year	Title	Role	Notes	Ref.
2008	Los Campeones de la Lucha Libre	Rey Extremo		
2009	Alvin and the Chipmunks: The Squeakquel	Digger		
2010	DC Super Friends	Flash, Mr. Freeze		
2012	A Cat in Paris	Dom, Dog Owner		
2013	Iron Man: Rise of Technovore	Ezekiel "Zeke" Stane, Technovore	Direct-to-video	
2013	Scooby-Doo! Stage Fright	K.J.	Direct-to-video	
2013	The Naughty List	Older Brother Elf, Pine Cone		
2013	Dick Figures: The Movie	Lord Takagami		
2014	Avengers Confidential: Black Widow & Punisher	Amadeus Cho	Direct-to-video	
2014	Batman: Assault on Arkham	Security Guard	Direct-to-video	
2014	Scooby-Doo! Frankencreepy	Daphomatic, Rock Dude	Direct-to-video	
2014	A Fairly Odd Summer	Foop	Television film	
2014	The Book of Life	Father Domingo, Cave Guardian		
2015	Scooby-Doo! Moon Monster Madness	Clark Sparkman	Direct-to-video	
2015	The Flintstones & WWE: Stone Age SmackDown!	Bamm-Bamm Rubble, Dino, Hoppy	Direct-to-video	
2015	Batman Unlimited: Animal Instincts	Punk #1, Rookie Cop	Direct-to-video	
2015	When Marnie Was There	Marnie's Father	English dub	
2015	The SpongeBob Movie: Sponge Out of Water	Seagull		
2015	Tom and Jerry: Spy Quest	Dr. Benton Quest	Direct-to-video	
2015	Justice League: Gods and Monsters	Ryan Choi	Direct-to-video	
2015	Batman Unlimited: Monster Mayhem	Houston Raines	Direct-to-video	
2015	Lego Marvel Super Heroes: Avengers Reassembled	Amadeus Cho / Iron Spider	Direct-to-video	
2015	Half-Shell Heroes: Blast to the Past	Tiger Claw, Triceraton Soldier #2, Triceraton #3, Guard #1	Television film	
2016	Lego DC Comics Super Heroes: Justice League: Gotham City Breakout	Bane, Commissioner James Gordon	Direct-to-video	
2016	Scooby-Doo! and WWE: Curse of the Speed Demon	Big Earl	Direct-to-video	
2016	Nerdland	Anchorman Eric		
2017	The Jetsons & WWE: Robo-WrestleMania!	Rolf Rodriguez	Direct-to-video	
2017	Batman and Harley Quinn	Wesley	Direct-to-video	
2017	Woody Woodpecker	Woody Woodpecker		
2018	Lego DC Comics Super Heroes: The Flash	The Atom, B'dg, Jimmy Olsen	Direct-to-video	
2018	Batman Ninja	Two-Face, Laughing Mask Samurai, Antiques Dealer	English dub; direct-to-video	
2018	Lego DC Comics Super Heroes: Aquaman – Rage of Atlantis	Jimmy Olsen, Bartender	Direct-to-video	
2018	Teen Titans Go! To the Movies	Aquaman, Stan Lee's Assistant		
2019	Batman vs. Teenage Mutant Ninja Turtles	Leonardo	Direct-to-video	
2019	Lucky	Gnomes	Direct-to-video	
2019	The Banana Splits Movie	Fleegle, Bingo, Drooper, Announcer	Direct-to-video	
2019	Invader Zim: Enter the Florpus	Angry Man, Boy, Announcer, Bracelet Monster	Direct-to-video	
2021	Batman: Soul of the Dragon	Axe Gang Leader	Direct-to-video	
2021	Space Jam: A New Legacy	Daffy Duck, Porky Pig, Elmer Fudd, Foghorn Leghorn, Marvin the Martian, Pepé Le Pew (deleted scene)		
2021	Arlo the Alligator Boy	Bradley Alouicious, Barn Folk, Butler, Photographer		
2022	King Tweety	Tweety, Sylvester, Larry Bird, The Handsome Stewart	Direct-to-video	
2022	Rise of the Teenage Mutant Ninja Turtles: The Movie	Splinter, Foot Soldiers, Radio Newscaster, Secret Agent		
2023	The Super Mario Bros. Movie	Diddy Kong, Toad General		
2023	Taz: Quest for Burger	Sid, Bandicoot Friend		
2024	The Casagrandes Movie	Pedestrian in Suit		
2024	Woody Woodpecker Goes to Camp	Woody Woodpecker		
2024	Thelma the Unicorn	Fan Boy		
2025	The Day the Earth Blew Up	Daffy Duck, Porky Pig		
2026	The Super Mario Galaxy Movie	Toad General		
2026	Buddy	Mr. Mailbox, Worry Well, Couchy, Trashy, Pee Flower		
2026	Coyote vs. Acme	Bugs Bunny, Charlie Dog, Daffy Duck, Dr. Peter Lorre, Foghorn Leghorn, Gossamer, Pepé Le Pew, Porky Pig, Road Runner, Senator Elmer Fudd, Tweety		
2026	Forgotten Island	Gen. Button Wutton, Sarangay		
2026	Daffy Season	Daffy Duck	Animated short; Posthumous release; dedicated in memory	
2026	The Cat in the Hat	Additional voices; Tweety Bird in the Warner Bros. Pictures Animation on-screen logo	Posthumous release	

=== Television ===
Year	Title	Role	Notes	Ref.
2001–2002	The Ripping Friends	Tooth Filling, General Bladderwort, Goat Minister of Propaganda, Secret Service Agent, Future Cat	Recurring role; also production assistant	
2003, 2006	Ren & Stimpy "Adult Party Cartoon"	Stimpy	Main role	
2005–2006	Coconut Fred's Fruit Salad Island!	Slip D'Peel, Slide D'Peel, Butchy, Land Crab	Main role	
2007–2008	El Tigre: The Adventures of Manny Rivera	Rodolfo Rivera / White Pantera, various voices	Main role	
2008	Avatar: The Last Airbender	Additional voices	Episode: "The Boiling Rock"	
2009	G.I. Joe: Resolute	Storm Shadow, Destro, Tunnel Rat	Main role	
2009	The Adventures of Digger and Friends	Digger	Main role; mascot for NASCAR on Fox	
2009–2017	The Fairly OddParents	Foop, various voices	Main role	
2010–2012	Hero: 108	Red-Faced Kwan, Wu Sung, Dog King, Ching Sen, Camel King, Ling Chung's Turtle, Cat King, Swamp Hippo King	Main role	
2010	T.U.F.F. Puppy	Guard #1	Episode: "Doom-Mates"	
2010	Zevo-3	Brad	Episode: "Daddy Dearest"	
2011	The Problem Solverz	Dork Face	Episode: "Zoo Cops"	
2011–2012	Dan Vs.	Ben, Paramedic, Ninja Dave	17 episodes	
2011–2012	Fanboy & Chum Chum	Retchy Lintpockets, Blue Berries, Blueberry Foreman		
2011–2013	The Looney Tunes Show	Marvin the Martian	Main role	
2011–2014	Superjail!	Lord Stingray	Main role	
2012	Iron Man: Armored Adventures	Thunderbolt Ross	Episode: "Rage of the Hulk"	
2012	Adventure Time	Tromo	2 episodes	
2012	Kick Buttowski: Suburban Daredevil	Robobot, Groundedbot	Episode: "Locked Out"	
2012–2014	Ben 10: Omniverse	Dr. Psychobos, Driba, Fistrick, Albedo (Galvan form), Diamondhead, Grey Matter, Arctiguana, Bellicus, Eatle, Ripjaws, Way Big, Upchuck, Toepick, Pax, Thunderpig, Jerry, Buzzshock, Solid Plugg, Rook Da, Raff, Megawhatts, Lackno, Mechaneer, Trombipulor, Sergeant Cast Iron, Poltroon, Cooper, Big Chuck, Chromastone, Contumelia, Pretty Boy Vreedles	Main role	
2012–2015	Black Dynamite	Fiendish Dr. Wu, Chinatown Assassin, Boo Coo Sow, News Reporter, Bill Cosby's Assistant, Television Executive, Child with Explosives, Donny Osmond, Dick Clark		
2013, 2020–2026	Rick and Morty	Various voices		
2013–2014	Xiaolin Chronicles	Raimundo Pedrosa, Jack Spicer, Dr. Toho, PandaBubba, Grand Master Dashi, Mini Dojo, Human Kid, Warden, Patty, Narrator, Monk Guan, Tai Shui	Main role	
2013–2015	Turbo Fast	Chet, various voices	Main role	
2013–2016	Sanjay and Craig	Googa #1, Skater #3, Toyosan, Curly Haired Boy, Suit, Cop on Noodman's Yard		
2013–2017	Ultimate Spider-Man	Amadeus Cho / Iron Spider, Arcade, Swarm, Scorpion	Main role	
2013–2017	Uncle Grandpa	Belly Bag, various voices	Main role	
2013–2025	Teen Titans Go!	Second Santa, Announcer, BTAS Commissioner Gordon, Gordanian Commander		
2014	The Tom and Jerry Show	Skunk, various voices	2 episodes	
2014	Lego Star Wars: The Yoda Chronicles	Luke Skywalker		
2014–2016	Breadwinners	Buhdeuce, various voices	Main role	
2014–2016	TripTank	Various voices		
2014–2017	Teenage Mutant Ninja Turtles	Tiger Claw, Triceratons, various voices	Main role	
2015	The Mr. Peabody & Sherman Show	Galileo Galilei	2 episodes	
2015	Lego Star Wars: Droid Tales	Luke Skywalker, various voices		
2015	Gravity Falls	Ernesto	Episode: "Weirdmageddon 2: Escape from Reality"	
2015–2016	Steven Universe	Belly Bag, Narrator, various voices	Episodes: "Say Uncle" and "Mr. Greg"	
2015–2017	Transformers: Robots in Disguise	Drift, Lt. Ziegler, Headlock, Look-Out, various voices	Main role	
2015–2018	The Adventures of Puss in Boots	Puss in Boots, various voices	Main role	
2015–2019	Star vs. the Forces of Evil	Three-Eyed Potato Baby, Cloudy, Sir Stabby, Spider with a Top Hat	Recurring role	
2015–2019	Mighty Magiswords	Phil the Thief, Hoppus, King Rexxtopher, various voices		
2015–2020	New Looney Tunes	Marvin the Martian, Pepé Le Pew, Hubie, Bertie, Cal, Old Man, Rock Hardcase, various voices	Main role	
2016	Transformers: Rescue Bots	Maven Danger, Skip Scobbie	Episode: "A Brush With Danger"	
2016	Kung Fu Panda: Legends of Awesomeness	Zhihui, Thief #2	2 episodes	
2016	Pig Goat Banana Cricket	Avocado, Cow, Mantis	Episode: "Cow Duck Avocado Mantis"	
2016	SpongeBob SquarePants	Shalmon	Episode: "Sandy's Nutmare"	
2016	Dinotrux	Stix, Gruff Gluphosaurus, Flynt, Auger, Bor-Is		
2016	Mixels	Paladum, Mixapod, Mixopolis Zoo Animals	Episode: "Every Knight Has Its Day"	
2016–2017	TMNT Summer Shorts	Donatello, Leonardo, Grimm	Shorts: "Don vs. Raph", "Turtles Take Time (and Space)" and "Teenage Mecha Ninja Turtles"	
2016–2017	Lego Star Wars: The Freemaker Adventures	Luke Skywalker, Protocol Droid	Recurring role	
2016–2017	Atomic Puppet	Joseph "Joey" Felt, Captain Atomic	Main role	
2016, 2019	Ben 10	Gust-O, Hideki	2 episodes	
2016–2018	Bunnicula	Patches the Weredude, additional voices	Recurring role	
2016–2019	The Powerpuff Girls	Allegro, Largo, Cosmic Bear, Swapper, various voices		
2017	Be Cool, Scooby-Doo!	Various voices		
2017	Ant-Man	Alien Leader		
2017–2018	Stretch Armstrong and the Flex Fighters	The Gentleman, Malouf, various voices		
2017–2018	Guardians of the Galaxy	Adam Warlock, Magus, Shokk, Sphinx	Recurring role	
2017–2020	Unikitty!	Master Frown, Crankybeard, Old Timey Mustache Man, various voices	Main role	
2017–2021	DuckTales	Beagle Boys, Captain Farley Foghorn, various voices	Recurring role	
2018	Legend of the Three Caballeros	José Carioca, Scrooge McDuck, various voices	Main cast	
2018	Lost in Oz	Various voices		
2018	Ask the StoryBots	Jake the Cupcake	Episode: "Why Can't I Eat Dessert All the Time?"	
2018	Dallas & Robo	Whiskey Johnson, Bill Dickman	Episode: "Le Mars"	
2018	Star Wars Resistance	Gorrak Wiles	Episode: "Fuel for the Fire"	
2018	Supernatural	Cousin Slicker	Episode: "Scoobynatural"	
2018	The Adventures of Kid Danger	Mr. Toto	Episode: "The Sushi Sitter"	
2018–2019	The Adventures of Rocky and Bullwinkle	Premier Leader		
2018–2019	Hot Streets	Various voices		
2018–2020	Rise of the Teenage Mutant Ninja Turtles	Splinter / Hamato Yoshi / Lou Jitsu, various voices	Main role	
2018–2022	Muppet Babies	Baby Fozzie, Bunsen Honeydew, various voices	Main role	
2018–2023	Ballmastrz: 9009	Flip Champion	Main role	
2019	Pinky Malinky	Flynn	Episode: "Advanced"	
2019	The Epic Tales of Captain Underpants	Rap Talkwell, Mr. Gigglenose, Robius	3 episodes	
2019	The Lion Guard	Pagala	Episode: "Marsh of Mystery"	
2019	Middle School Moguls	Mogul Frostbottom, Automated Voice, Mogulbot, Incidental Sports Boy	4 episodes	
2019	Where's Waldo?	Koala, Dingo	Episode: "Australian Blunder Down Under"	
2019	Spider-Man	Mister Negative, Cop #2	Episode: "Brand New Day"	
2019–2027	The Loud House	Rex, Janitor Ed	6 episodes	
2019–2020	Big Hero 6: The Series	Uncle Samurai, Announcer, Cop, Detective Kato, Buddy Guardians	Recurring role	
2019–2020	The Rocketeer	Various voices		
2019–2020	Archibald's Next Big Thing	Beatnik Ant, Mikael, Leonard, Additional Voices	Recurring role	
2019–2022	T.O.T.S.	Mr. Woodbird, various voices	Main role	
2019–2022	The Casagrandes	Bruno, Nelson, El Cucuy, various voices	Recurring role	
2020	Harvey Girls Forever!	Stinkie	Episode: "Harvey Endings"	
2020	The Lego Star Wars Holiday Special	Luke Skywalker, Stormtrooper	Disney+ special	
2020–2021	Fast & Furious Spy Racers	Suspicious Man, Van Guy, Agent Medina, Henchman, Radio Show Host		
2020–2022	The Mighty Ones	Ben Stinkbug, Uncle Berry, Gunkus, Narrator, Rat King, Young Bit, Comedy Bit, Acorn, Yohan, Buggzo, Bee 2, Shredsy, Koko, Maple Leaf		
2020–2022	Doug Unplugs	Bob Bot, Seagull, Brad, Chaz, Fancy, Thomas's Grandpa, Frank, Squishy Bots		
2020–2023	Animaniacs	Daffy Duck, Scientist	4 episodes	
2020–2023	Looney Tunes Cartoons	Bugs Bunny, Daffy Duck, Tweety, Marvin the Martian, Barnyard Dawg, Charlie Dog, The Weasel	Main role	
2020–2024	Star Trek: Lower Decks	Cerritos Conn Officer, Snell		
2020–2025	Solar Opposites	Chris the Red Goobler (replacing Justin Roiland), various voices	14 episodes	
2021	To Tell the Truth	Himself		
2021	Lego Star Wars: Terrifying Tales	Luke Skywalker, Guard Droid	Disney+ special	
2021	Amphibia	Mr. Wu	Episode: "True Colors"	
2021	Trese	Nuno, various voices	English dub	
2021	Q-Force	Coeur de la Mer Computer		
2021	A Tale Dark & Grimm	King, Stars, Shillingworth, Soldier, Guard, Ferryman, Couchface, King's Father, Castle Guard		
2021	Maya and the Three	Vucub, the God of Jungle Animals		
2021	Inside Job	Jason Bourne, Joey, DNA Tester, Farmer		
2021	Saturday Morning All Star Hits!	Pasto, Tigor, Derek, Meiko		
2021–2022	Kid Cosmic	Fry, Emerald Wing, Mstr Wlkzn		
2021–2022	Tig n' Seek	Himself, cameo; Various voices		
2021–2022	Yabba-Dabba Dinosaurs	Dino		
2022	Samurai Rabbit: The Usagi Chronicles	Chikabuma, Kagehito, Keisatsukan, Keisatsukan #2, Admiral Nochi, O-Dokuro, Hat-Yokai, Sakuran, Stool-Yokai, Street Tough 2		
2022	We Baby Bears	Broccoli, Celery Blacksmith, Veggie Artist, Sam Spider Spade, Chief of Police, Wasp, Robot Panda, Cashier		
2022	The Boys	Buster Beaver	2 episodes	
2022	The Owl House	Principal Faust	Episode: "Them's the Breaks, Kid"	
2022	Lego Star Wars: Summer Vacation	Luke Skywalker, Stormtroopers	Disney+ special	
2022–2023	Gremlins: Secrets of the Mogwai	Snout, Noggin, various voices		
2022–2025	Bugs Bunny Builders	Bugs Bunny, Daffy Duck, Tweety	Main role	
2022–2025	Hamster & Gretel	CopyCat		
2023	Aqua Teen Hunger Force	Borf, Game Announcer	Episode: "Shaketopia"	
2023	Pluto	Arnold	English dub	
2023	Akuma-kun	Tobayama	English dub	
2023	Harley Quinn	Starro, Bouncing Boy	Episode: "Icons Only"	
2023	Blue Eye Samurai	Brawny Shindo Samurai	Episode: "Hammerscale"	
2023–2024	Hailey's On It!	Paul (filling in for Billy Kametz), various voices		
2023–2025	Star Wars: Young Jedi Adventures	EB-3, Pirate		
2023–2025	Tiny Toons Looniversity	Buster Bunny, Daffy Duck, Gossamer	Main role	
2023–2026	Kiff	Reggie, Roy Fox, various voices		
2023–2026	Pupstruction	Harry, Lloyd, Sniff		
2023–2026	Krapopolis	Various voices	18 episodes	
2023–TBA	Bob's Burgers	Robert "Big Bob" Belcher, Sr. (replacing Bill Hader), Jimmy Pesto (replacing Jay Johnston)	Recurring roles	
2024	Rock Paper Scissors	Ooze Prince, Birthday Cop		
2024	Megamind Rules!	Bad Guy Brad, Reporter, additional voices		
2024	X-Men '97	Sentinels / Master Mold, News Anchor	5 episodes	
2024	Tales of the Teenage Mutant Ninja Turtles	Dad, Goons	Episode: "Donnie Goes Deep"	
2024	The Fairly OddParents: A New Wish	Peri, Irep, additional voices	Main role	
2024–2025	Transformers: EarthSpark	Prowl, Hot Rod, Kid, Shadowy Figure, additional voices		
2024–2026	SuperKitties	Wiggles, Colby Jack, additional voices	15 episodes	
2024–2026	Hot Wheels Let's Race	Coop's Dad, Professor Rearview, Squeakers	12 episodes and "Attack of the T-Rex" special	
2024–2027	Invincible	D.A. Sinclair (replacing Ezra Miller), Magnattack, various voices		
2025	StuGo	Various voices		
2025	Iron Man and His Awesome Friends	Man at Stark Expo	Episode: "Great Expo-tations"	
2025	Ishura	Zigita Zogi the One Thousand and First	English dub	
2025	The Fable	Kenjiro Takoda	English dub	
2026–2027	Avatar: Seven Havens	Jin-Woo, Kosal, Pich, Kuzon, Pudding Guy, various voices		
2026–2027	Regular Show: The Lost Tapes	Translator, Principal Party Horse, Steve, Announcer, Various voices	3 episodes	
2026	Chibiverse	Big Time Beagle	Episode: "Snowball Battle Royale"	
2026	President Curtis	CCTV Operator, Fort Knox Security Guard, John Wilkes Booth Clone		
2026	Lego Star Wars: The Mandalorian	Luke Skywalker, EV-9D9	Disney+ special	
2026	Golden Axe	Rooster		
2026	The Simpsons	Mr. Fong, Harry Metsali	Episode: "Dream Scenari-Moe"; posthumous release; dedicated in memory	
2026	Mickey's Home Alone	Ferv	Television special; posthumous release	

=== Video games ===
Year	Title	Role	Notes	Ref.
2011	Nicktoons MLB	Stimpy		
2012	Ben 10: Omniverse	Driba, Diamondhead, Arctiguana, Megawhatts		
2013	Ben 10: Omniverse 2	Dr. Psychobos, Way Bads		
2014	Teenage Mutant Ninja Turtles: Danger of the Ooze	Tiger Claw		
2014	Looney Tunes Dash	Speedy Gonzales, Count Bloodcount, Hugo the Abominable Snowman		
2015	Adventure Time: Finn & Jake Investigations	Pillowmint Butler, Marshmallow Kid, Gnome		
2016	Teenage Mutant Ninja Turtles: Portal Power	Tiger Claw, Rock Creature		
2016	Ratchet & Clank	Chairman Drek		
2018	Lego DC Super-Villains	Mr. Freeze		
2018	Looney Tunes: World of Mayhem	Bugs Bunny, Daffy Duck, Elmer Fudd, Sylvester the Cat, Yosemite Sam, Foghorn Leghorn, Marvin the Martian, Granny, Wile E. Coyote, Road Runner, Pepé Le Pew, Barnyard Dawg, Speedy Gonzales, Tasmanian Devil, Witch Hazel, Big Chungus		
2020	Battletoads	Rash		
2022	MultiVersus	Bugs Bunny, Tom Cat, Jerry Mouse, Marvin the Martian, Foghorn Leghorn		
2023	DreamWorks All-Star Kart Racing	Puss in Boots		
2024	Like a Dragon: Infinite Wealth	Additional voices		
2024	Teenage Mutant Ninja Turtles: Wrath of the Mutants	Tiger Claw		
2024	Looney Tunes: Wacky World of Sports	Bugs Bunny, Daffy Duck, Porky Pig, Elmer Fudd, Marvin the Martian, Tweety Bird		
2025	Date Everything!	Dishy		
2026	Super Free Play	Jay	Main role, posthumous release	

=== Other ===
Year	Title	Role	Notes	Ref.
2011–2012	Dick Figures	Gerald Butler, Genie, Mall Santa, Golden Lotus Ninjas	Voice, web series	
2013	I Know That Voice	Himself	Documentary	
2014–2018	Bravest Warriors	The Concierge, Karswell, Additional voices	Web series	
2015–2016	Batman Unlimited	Punk	Voice, web series; episode: "Battle in the Streets"	
2017	Critical Role	Frankfurt	Episode: "Bar Room Blitz"	
2018–2022	Woody Woodpecker	Woody Woodpecker, additional voices	Voice, web series	
2019	Cans Without Labels	Slab	Short film	
2019–2023	Ollie & Scoops	Scoops	Voice, web series	
2021	Long Gone Gulch	Mako	Short film	
2021	Kooky the Keukegen	Kooky	Voice	
2021	Bugs & Daffy's Thanksgiving Road Trip	Bugs Bunny, Daffy Duck	Voice, podcast	
2023	The Trident	Puss in Boots	Voice, short from Puss in Boots: The Last Wish	
2025	Bullet Time	Bullet	Short film	
2025	Cow Tales	Enthusiastic Narrator, Walter	Voice, 2 episodes, web series	
2026	Cow Squad	Radio Announcer, Wolf, Squirrels	Voice, 3 episodes, web series	
2026	Air Jordan "Greatness Is Never Out of Reach" campaign	Tweety Bird, Elmer Fudd, Daffy Duck, Bugs Bunny	Voice, commercials, semi-posthumous release	
2026	Space Jam: Beyond the Jam	Bugs Bunny, Himself	Six-part documentary, posthumous release	
