= Sufferin' Cats =

Sufferin' Cats may refer to:

- Sufferin' Cats!, a 1943 Tom and Jerry cartoon
- Sufferin' Cats, a 1961 Woody Woodpecker cartoon
