= Woody Woodpecker (franchise) =

American media franchise

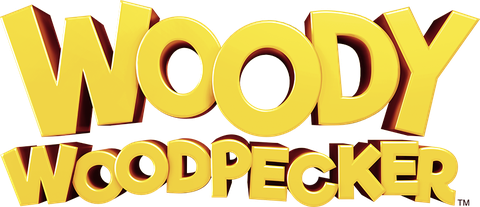
- The title for the 2017 film
- Created by: Walter Lantz
- Original work: Knock Knock (1940)
- Owners: Universal Pictures (NBCUniversal)
- Years: 1940–present

Print publications
- Comics: Dell Comics (1942–1974); Gold Key Comics (1962–1984); Harvey Comics (1991–1994)

Films and television
- Films: Woody Woodpecker (2017); Woody Woodpecker Goes to Camp (2024)
- Short films: Woody Woodpecker shorts (1940–1972)
- Web series: Woody Woodpecker (2018–2022)
- Animated series: The Woody Woodpecker Show (1957–1977); The New Woody Woodpecker Show (1999–2002)

Games
- Video games: List of video games

Miscellaneous
- Theme park attraction: Woody Woodpecker's Nuthouse Coaster

Woody Woodpecker is an American media franchise that originally started in 1940 with the release of the short film Knock Knock. The franchise was created by Walter Lantz and produced by Walter Lantz Productions. It is distributed by Universal Pictures.

The franchise revolves around about the humorous adventures and interactions of the title character and his friends like Winnie Woodpecker, enemies like Buzz Buzzard and other characters. The stories revolve around Woody's cheeky and often chaotic pranks, his attempts to solve problems, and his interactions with other characters such as Andy Panda, Chilly Willy, Winnie Woodpecker, Knothead, Splinter, Buzz Buzzard and others.

== History ==
Woody Woodpecker was made by Walter Lantz, an American animator and cartoonist. He made his first appearance in the short film Knock Knock in 1940. Woody's popularity grew, and he soon became a star in his own right. He appeared in numerous animated shorts, often finding himself in humorous and chaotic situations. Walter Lantz Productions entered into a deal with Universal Pictures in 1940 that allowed Universal to distribute the Woody cartoons.

In 1985, Universal Pictures acquired the rights of Woody Woodpecker and Walter Lantz Productions and added them to its portfolio. Since then, Universal has continued to use Woody, notably in their theme parks. Woody Woodpecker is not so much represented in television and films, but more in other media, such as in the Universal Studios Theme Parks or merchandising. Universal has since produced new projects, including a television series and two live-action/CGI hybrid films released in 2017 and 2024.

== Animated series ==
| Title | Release date |
|---|---|
| The Woody Woodpecker Show | October 3, 1957 |
| The New Woody Woodpecker Show | May 8, 1999 |
| Woody Woodpecker | December 3, 2018 |

== Films ==
| Title | Release date |
|---|---|
| Woody Woodpecker | October 5, 2017 |
| Woody Woodpecker Goes to Camp | April 12, 2024 |
| Untitled third film | TBA |

== Video games ==
| Title | Release date |
|---|---|
| Woody Woodpecker's Frustrated Vacations | October 1996 |
| Woody Woodpecker Racing | November 22, 2000 |
| Woody Woodpecker: Escape from Buzz Buzzard Park | August 14, 2001 |
| Universal Studios Theme Parks Adventure | December 7, 2001 |
| Woody Woodpecker in Crazy Castle 5 | 2002 |

== Comics ==
| Title | Release date | Publisher |
|---|---|---|
| New Funnies | March 1944 | Dell Comics |
| March of Comics | 1947 | Western Publishing |
| Four Color | October 1947 | Dell Comics |
| Woody Woodpecker | December 1952 | Dell Comics |
| Woody Woodpecker | October 1962 | Gold Key Comics |

== Universal Studios theme parks ==
| Title | Opening date | Closing date |
|---|---|---|
| Woody Woodpecker's Nuthouse Coaster | March 13, 1999 | January 15, 2023 |

Woody Woodpecker is popular at the Universal Studios Theme Parks. Universal Studios Florida is the only park with rides, areas and meet and greets.

Universal Studios Hollywood, Universal Studios Singapore, Universal Orlando Resort, Universal Studios Japan and Universal Beijing Resort have no rides, just only events and meet and greet.
