= Beechnut =

Beechnut may refer to:

- The nut of the beech tree
- Beech-Nut baby food
- Beech-Nut, a brand of chewing tobacco produced by the Lorillard Tobacco Company

== See also ==
- The Beach Nut
