= Woody Woodpecker =

Fictional cartoon bird

- Woody Woodpecker character
- First appearance: Night Life of the Bugs (October 9, 1936, early version); Knock Knock (November 25, 1940, official)
- Created by: Walter Lantz; Ben Hardaway
- Designed by: Alex Lovy (1940–1943); Emery Hawkins and Art Heinemann (1944–1947); Dick Lundy and Fred Moore (1947–1949); Laverne Harding (1950 onwards)
- Voiced by: Mel Blanc (1940–1941, 1948–1955 (Note: Blanc's signature laugh would be used from 1942–1951, while his phrase "Guess who?" continued to be used from 1942–1998.)); Danny Webb (1941); Kent Rogers (1941–1943); Dick Nelson (1943, 1954); Ben Hardaway (1944–1949); Grace Stafford (1950–1991 (Note: Archived recordings used in 1995.)); Billy West (1998–2002); Eric Bauza (2017–2024); (see below)
- Years active: 1940–present
- Awards: Hollywood Walk of Fame
- Spinoffs: Appearances

In-universe information
- Species: Pileated woodpecker
- Gender: Male
- Family: Splinter (niece); Knothead (nephew)
- Significant other: Winnie Woodpecker

Woody Woodpecker is a cartoon character created by American animators Walter Lantz and Ben Hardaway. He appeared in theatrical short films produced by Walter Lantz Productions and Universal Pictures' animation studio from 1940 until 1972. The character, depicted as an anthropomorphic pileated woodpecker, evolved significantly in design and personality over the course of his series' run, from an insane bird with an unusually garish appearance to a more refined-looking and acting character in the vein of the later Chuck Jones version of fellow Hardaway creation Bugs Bunny. Woody was originally voiced by prolific voice actor Mel Blanc, who was succeeded in the shorts by Danny Webb and four others.

Woody's cartoons were first broadcast on television in 1957 under the title The Woody Woodpecker Show, bookended by new live-action/animated hybrid footage of Woody and Lantz. Since his theatrical series ended upon the closure of Lantz's studio in 1972, the character has been revived for special productions and occasions; as well as for a Saturday-morning cartoon television series called The New Woody Woodpecker Show, which aired from 1999 to 2002. His recent appearances include a 2017 live-action/CGI hybrid feature film released theatrically in Latin America and direct-to-video elsewhere; a new series of YouTube shorts launched in 2018; and 2024's Woody Woodpecker Goes to Camp on Netflix.

Woody is the official mascot of Universal and has a motion picture star on the Hollywood Walk of Fame at 7000 Hollywood Boulevard. He was also one of many famous cartoon characters to make cameo appearances in the 1988 film Who Framed Roger Rabbit. Woody and his friends are also icons at the Universal Studios Theme Parks worldwide, as well as the PortAventura Park in Spain, in which Universal formerly had a financial stake.

== Origin ==
The character was co-created in 1940 by producer Walter Lantz and animator Ben "Bugs" Hardaway, the latter of whom previously laid the groundwork for Woody's fellow screwball characters Bugs Bunny and Daffy Duck at Leon Schlesinger Productions in the late 1930s. The inspiration for Woody's character allegedly came during Lantz's honeymoon with his wife, Grace, in June Lake, California in 1940, a dubious story given the fact that Woody's first appearance predated the Lantz couple's honeymoon. A noisy acorn woodpecker outside their cabin kept the couple awake at night, and when heavy rain started, they learned that the bird had bored holes in their cabin's roof. Walter and Gracie told Dallas attorney Rod Phelps during a visit that Walter wanted to shoot the bird, but Gracie suggested that her husband make a cartoon about the bird, and thus Woody was born. According to Lantz's biographer Joe Adamson, however, Ben Hardaway and Lowell Elliott had written a story where Andy Panda and his father, Papa Panda, experienced roof troubles caused by a rainstorm. Lantz took one look at the storyboard and found it "too expensive". He needed a roofing problem that was easier to animate, and suggested a pesky bird like a woodpecker (a couple of Lantz's 1930s cartoons, including the 1936 Oswald the Lucky Rabbit cartoon Night Life of the Bugs, had featured incidental woodpeckers). Woody shares many characteristics in common with the pileated woodpecker in terms of both physical appearance as well as his characteristic laugh, which resembles the call of the pileated woodpecker. These similarities are the result of the artistic license of the creators and have caused much confusion within the birding community among those who have attempted to classify Woody's species.

In the short Dumb Like a Fox (1964), a museum offers a 25-dollar reward to anyone who captures a campephilus principalis (ivory-billed woodpecker), which is Woody Woodpecker himself.

== History ==
=== Early years ===
Woody Woodpecker first appeared in the short Knock Knock on November 25, 1940. The cartoon ostensibly stars Andy Panda and Papa Panda, who the woodpecker constantly pesters for his own amusement. Meanwhile, Andy tries to sprinkle salt on Woody's tail, believing that this will capture the bird. To Woody's surprise, Andy's attempts prevail, and Woody is taken away to the psychiatric hospital by equally insane paramedics.

The Woody of Knock Knock was designed by animator Alex Lovy. Woody's original voice actor, Mel Blanc, stopped performing the character after the first three cartoons to work exclusively for Leon Schlesinger Productions (later renamed Warner Bros. Cartoons), producer of the Looney Tunes and Merrie Melodies after signing a loyalty contract in exchange for screen credit. At Leon Schlesinger's, Blanc had already established the voices of two other famous "screwball" characters who preceded Woody, Daffy Duck and Bugs Bunny. Ironically, Blanc's characterization of the Woody Woodpecker laugh had initially been applied to the prototype of Bugs Bunny, in shorts such as those above Elmer's Candid Camera and was later transferred to Woody. Blanc's regular speaking voice for Woody was much like the early Daffy Duck, minus the lisp. Once Warner Bros. signed Blanc to an exclusive contract, Woody's voice-over work was taken over by Danny Webb, followed by Kent Rogers and Dick Nelson, and Ben Hardaway later became Woody's voice after Rogers was sent to the army during World War II and would voice the woodpecker for the rest of the decade. This makes Woody Woodpecker one of the very few cartoon characters initially voiced by Mel Blanc to be voiced by someone else during Blanc's lifetime. Despite this, Blanc continued to voice Woody on a Mutual Network radio show and in recordings for Capitol Records from 1948 until 1955, while his laugh would continue to be used in the shorts until 1951.

Audiences reacted well to Knock Knock, and Lantz realized he had finally hit upon a star to replace the waning Oswald the Lucky Rabbit, a character created by Walt Disney and Ub Iwerks who served as the studio's star before Lantz bought out the studio from Universal Pictures, as well as the low-performing Andy Panda. The character's brash demeanor was a natural hit during World War II. His image appeared on US aircraft as nose art and on mess halls, and audiences on the homefront watched Woody cope with familiar problems such as food shortages. The 1943 Woody cartoon The Dizzy Acrobat was nominated for the 1943 Academy Award for Best Short Subject (Cartoons), which it lost to the MGM Tom and Jerry cartoon The Yankee Doodle Mouse. Woody Woodpecker's debut also marked a change in directing style for Lantz's cartoons, which shifted from Disney-like sentimentality to high-energy slapstick, especially after James Culhane was hired by Lantz from Leon Schlesinger Productions as a director.

Woody Woodpecker and his captive client in The Barber of Seville (1944), directed by Shamus Culhane.

Animator Emery Hawkins and layout artist Art Heinemann streamlined Woody's appearance for the 1944 film The Barber of Seville. The bird became rounder and cuter, while remaining equally demented. He also sported a simplified color scheme and a brighter smile. Nevertheless, Culhane continued to use Woody as an aggressive lunatic, not a domesticated straight man or defensive homebody, as many other studios' characters had become. The follow-up to The Barber of Seville, The Beach Nut, introduced Woody's original chief nemesis, Wally Walrus, who endures continuous harassment from Woody yet is competent enough to occasionally turn the tables.

Woody's wild days were numbered, however. In 1946, Lantz hired Disney veteran Dick Lundy who previously directed a few Andy Panda cartoons to now direct Woody's cartoons. Lundy rejected Culhane's take on the series and made Woody more reasonable; Woody no longer tricked others without provocation. Lundy also paid more attention to animation, making Woody's new films more Disney-esque in their design, style, animation, and timing. Buzz Buzzard, a Lantz character introduced in Wet Blanket Policy (1948), succeeded Wally Walrus as Woody's primary antagonist.

In 1947, contract renewal negotiations between Lantz and Universal (now Universal-International) fell through, and Lantz began distributing his cartoons through United Artists. The UA-distributed Lantz cartoons featured higher-quality animation and the influence of Dick Lundy (the films' budgets remained the same). Former Disney animators such as Fred Moore and Ed Love began working at Lantz and assisted Lundy in adding touches of the Disney style to Woody's cartoons. Despite the Disney style added for the later cartoons, Woody's cartoons maintained the heavy slapstick and madcap humor from the pre-Lundy cartoons.

Wet Blanket Policy, directed by Dick Lundy, introduced Woody's new adversary Buzz Buzzard and featured Woody's Academy Award-nominated theme song, "The Woody Woodpecker Song".

=== "The Woody Woodpecker Song" ===
In 1947, Woody got his theme song when musicians George Tibbles and Ramey Idriss wrote "The Woody Woodpecker Song", making ample use of the character's famous laugh. Kay Kyser's 1948 recording of the song, with Harry Babbitt's laugh interrupting vocalist Gloria Wood, became one of the biggest hit singles of 1948. Other artists did covers, including Woody's original voice actor, Mel Blanc. Lantz first used "The Woody Woodpecker Song" in Wet Blanket Policy (1948), and it became the first and only song from an animated short subject to be nominated for the Academy Award for Best Original Song in 1948, but it lost out to "Buttons and Bows". Lantz soon adopted the song as Woody's theme music.

"The Woody Woodpecker Song" and the Woody Woodpecker cartoons extensively used Woody's famous laugh, upsetting the man who created it, Mel Blanc. He first used the laughter, in a different recording, for the seminal pre-Bugs Bunny character in 1938's Porky's Hare Hunt. Although Blanc had only recorded three shorts as the voice of Woody, his laugh had been recorded as a stock sound effect and used in every subsequent Woody Woodpecker short up until this point. Blanc sued Lantz and lost, but Lantz settled out of court when Blanc filed an appeal. Although Lantz stopped using Blanc's Woody Woodpecker laugh as a stock effect in the early 1950s, Blanc's voice was still heard saying "Guess who?" at the beginning of every cartoon for the duration of the Woody Woodpecker series.

=== Financial impasse/hiatus ===
Financial problems at United Artists during the aftermath of the Paramount case—which forced movie distributors to end the practice of block booking, or selling shorts and features to theaters in packages—affected Lantz's studio. The revenues Lantz received from UA's distribution of his cartoons were much lower than his returns had been from Universal. Once the Lantz studio hit its loan debt cap of $250,000 at the Bank of America, Lantz was forced to shut the studio down. He began a series of staggered layoffs in December 1948 until work on the final 1940s Lantz short, the Woody cartoon Drooler's Delight, was finished at the otherwise shuttered studio in early 1949.

Walter Lantz Productions remained closed for a full calendar year. During this time, Walter Lantz and his wife, actress Grace Stafford, toured Europe to spend money impounded there after World War II and also to entertain the European Universal exchanges still distributing the Universal era Lantz cartoons. By keeping the studio closed while the Universal and United Artists Woody Woodpecker cartoons were still in distribution, Lantz was able to amass enough income to pay off the studio's debts and upgrade the studio, after which time the studio finally reopened with a reduced staff.

=== Later films ===
The revived Lantz studio's first new project was an animated segment of the feature film Destination Moon (1950), produced by Lantz's friend George Pal. In the segment, astronauts are shown an animated educational film featuring Woody Woodpecker explaining rocket propulsion.

Beginning with Destination Moon, Woody's voice was assumed by Grace Stafford. According to the Lantzes, Stafford slipped a recording of herself into a stack of audition tapes, and her husband chose her without knowing her identity. Lantz also began having Stafford supply Woody's laugh due to the court settlement with Mel Blanc, but Stafford was not credited for the role at her request until Misguided Missile (1958), as she felt audiences might reject a woman performing Woody's voice. She also tried to tone down the character through their voice work to appease Universal's complaints about Woody's raucousness.

Lantz signed again with Universal (now Universal-International) in 1950 and began production on two entries that director Dick Lundy and storymen Ben Hardaway and Henry Wilson Allen had begun before the 1948 layoff. These shorts have no director's credit, as Lantz claimed to have directed them himself. Puny Express (1951) was the first to be released, followed by Sleep Happy. These shorts marked a departure from past dialogue-driven shorts. Though Stafford now voiced Woody, her job was limited, as Woody (and other characters) spoke less in the first dozen or so shorts. Because of these entries, Woody became popular outside the English-speaking world, thanks to the lack of a language barrier (The Pink Panther shorts of the 1960s and 1970s also enjoyed worldwide popularity due to this pantomime luxury).

Nine more Lantz-directed Woody cartoons followed before Don Patterson became Woody's new director in 1952. The bird was redesigned again, this time by animator Laverne Harding, who made Woody smaller and cuter, moving his crest forward from its original backward position. The small Lantz Studios logo seen at the start of every cartoon — Woody as an armored knight on horseback carrying a lance — continued for a while to display Woody with his former topknot. For 1955's The Tree Medic, one last makeover was given to the woodpecker, making Woody's eye a simple black dot and removing the green/hazel iris he had had since his beginnings, but Woody's eyes were not changed in the cartoon's intros, and they remained green for the rest of the shorts' production run. During this time, the opening was changed as well. Instead of having Woody's name on-screen and Woody pecking a hole in the screen to introduce himself, Woody now pecked his way onto the screen, greeting the audience with his iconic "Guess who?", then carved out his name on either a brown or gray wood background and jumped around the screen while laughing.

By 1955, Paul J. Smith had taken over as the primary director of Woody's shorts, with periodic fill-in shorts directed by Alex Lovy and Jack Hannah, among others. With Smith on board, the shorts maintained a healthy dose of frenetic energy, while the animation was simplified due to budget constraints.

Woody in 1961's The Bird Who Came to Dinner, directed by Paul J. Smith. This cartoon was made several years after Woody's last redesign.

In addition to Stafford providing Woody's voice, which returned the cartoon to being more dialogue-driven again, voice talents during this period were generally split between Dallas McKennon and Daws Butler. Several of Woody's recurring costars were also introduced during this era, such as Gabby Gator (voiced by Butler in an Ozarks voice, a slightly different southern dialect than he used for Huckleberry Hound). Gabby first appeared in Everglade Raid (as "Al I. Gator"). Other films paired Woody with a girlfriend, Winnie Woodpecker (voiced by Stafford), and a niece and nephew, Splinter and Knothead (both voiced by June Foray). Other antagonists that Woody has dealt with were Ms. Meany (voiced by Stafford) and Dapper Denver Dooley (voiced by McKennon).

=== Woody in the television era ===
As Lantz was struggling financially, Woody's longevity was secured when he made the jump to television in The Woody Woodpecker Show on ABC. The half-hour program consisted of three theatrical Woody shorts followed by a brief look at cartoon creation hosted by Lantz. It ran from 1957 to 1958 then entered syndication until 1966. NBC revived the show in 1970 and 1976. In addition, the woodpecker was no longer dishing out abuse to his foils, but was instead on the receiving end. The first significant short to feature Woody as a serious, put-upon character was 1961's Franken-Stymied. Woody's popularity had been based on his manic craziness, but by 1961, this had all but been eliminated in favor of a more serious Woody, a straight man trying to do good. This was due in part to Woody's large presence on television, which meant Lantz had to meet the stringent rules against violence for children's television. Though production continued until 1972, the cartoons were a definite notch lower than in the 1940s and 1950s.

Woody appeared in new theatrical shorts until 1972, when Lantz closed his studio due to rising production costs. His cartoons returned to syndication in the late 1970s. Lantz sold his library of Woody shorts to MCA/Universal in 1985. Universal repackaged the cartoons for another syndicated Woody Woodpecker Show in 1987. A year later, Woody made a cameo in Who Framed Roger Rabbit, voiced by Cherry Davis, near the end of the film.

Woody Woodpecker reappeared in the series The New Woody Woodpecker Show, which ran on Saturday mornings on Fox Kids and YTV from 1999 to 2002, voiced by Billy West. For this series, Woody was redesigned more like his mid-1940s look (1944 to 1949), pushing back his crest and making his eyes green again. Winnie Woodpecker, who had debuted in Real Gone Woody (1954), became a semi-regular character as Woody's primary love interest. Like Woody, Winnie was redesigned to look almost exactly like Woody did from 1950 until 1972, the obvious differences being that she was a female woodpecker and had blue eyes. Woody's primary antagonist was Wally Walrus, who became Woody's neighbor (Woody lived in a tree house in Mrs. Meany's front yard, and Wally lived next door). Buzz Buzzard often appeared, as did Mrs. Meany and several other older characters.

From 2018 to 2022, a new series of Woody Woodpecker cartoons streamed exclusively for YouTube, simply titled Woody Woodpecker.

In 2023, MeTV acquired the broadcast rights to Walter Lantz cartoons from 1934 to 1972 to air The Woody Woodpecker Show on Saturday morning on September 2, marking its return on TV after 25 years.

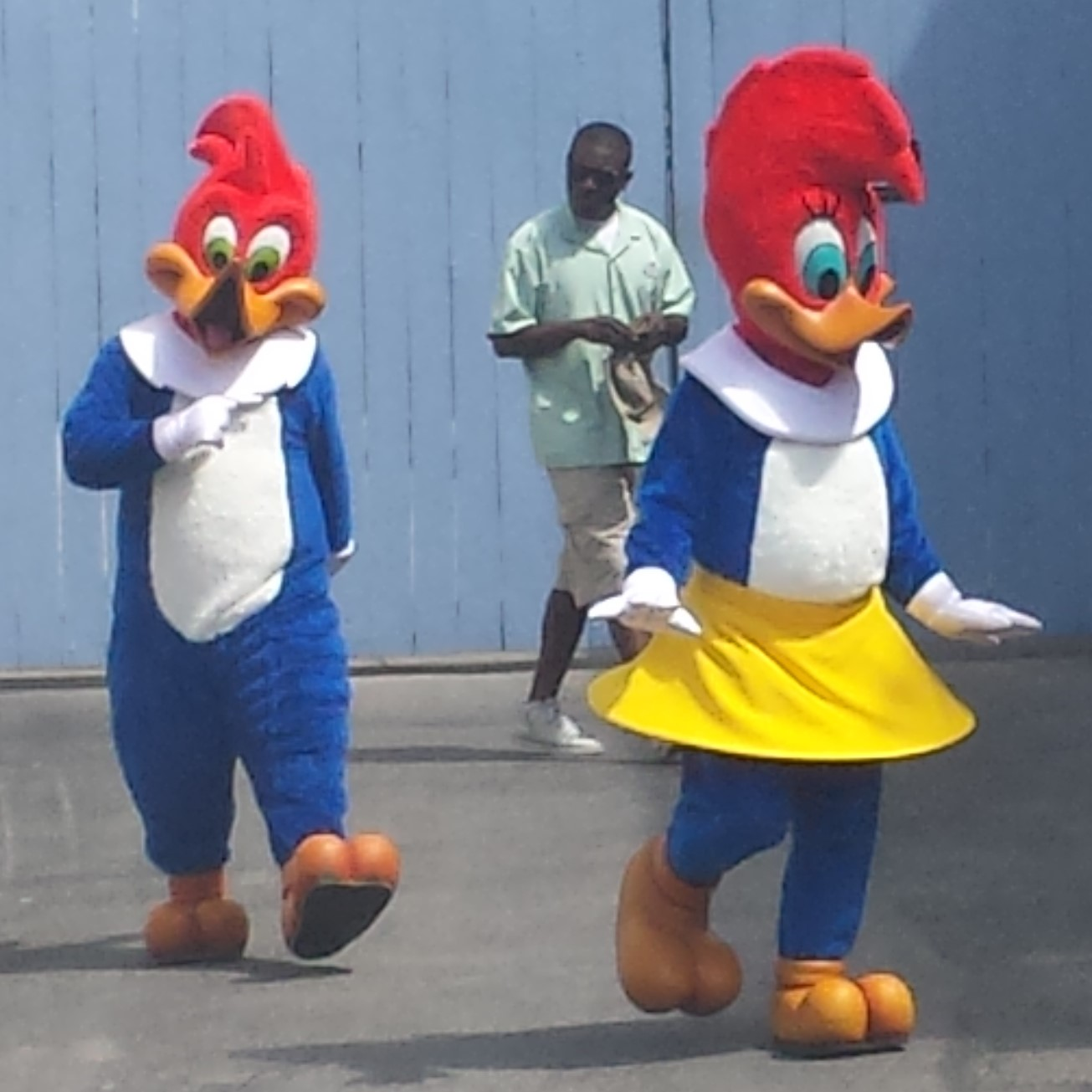
Woody and Winnie Woodpecker, as seen at Universal Studios Florida.

== Reception ==
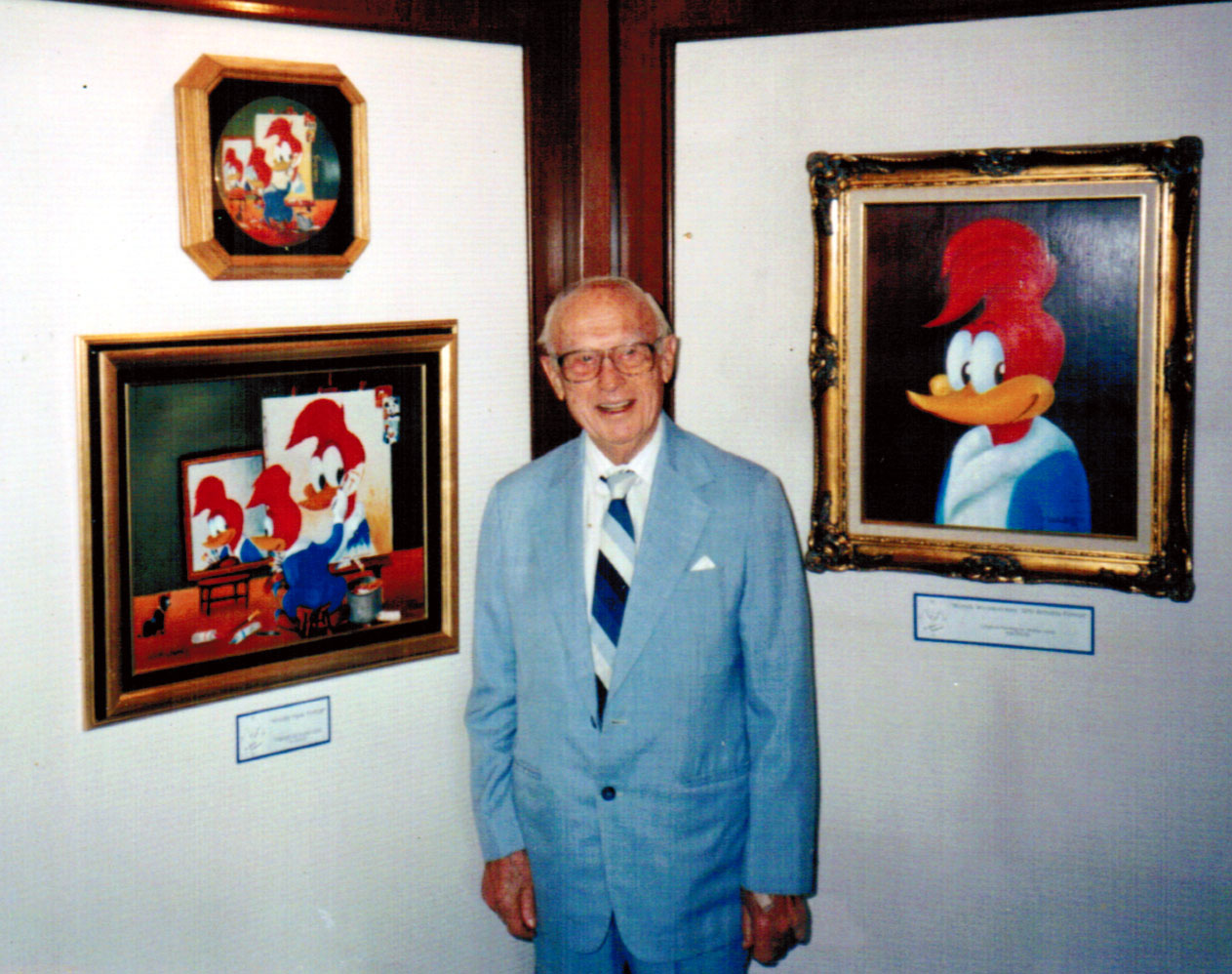
Walter Lantz with paintings of Woody

The Woody Woodpecker Show was named the 88th best animated series by IGN.

=== Legacy ===
Filmmaker David Lynch, surrounded by five Woody Woodpecker dolls, in a 1982 trailer introducing screenings of his 1977 film Eraserhead at the Nuart Theatre

Walter Lantz and movie pioneer George Pal were good friends. Woody Woodpecker cameos in nearly every film that Pal produced or directed; for example, during the 1966 sequence in The Time Machine (1960), a little girl drops her Woody Woodpecker doll as she goes into an air raid shelter. In Doc Savage: The Man of Bronze (1975), Grace Stafford cameos, carrying a Woody Woodpecker doll.

Obvious references to "The Woody Woodpecker Song" can be found in the work of at least two noted jazz innovators: specifically, Charlie Parker, a number of whose solos quote it in passing, and Wayne Shorter, whose 1961 composition "Look at the Birdie" — as heard on Art Blakey and the Jazz Messengers' Roots & Herbs (recorded in 1961, released in 1970) — has been singled out by both composer/trumpeter David Weiss and Shorter's biographer Michelle Mercer as an ingenious variation on the theme. In addition, a full-fledged cover of the song itself was recorded in 1986 by jazz trumpeter Woody Shaw for his 1987 release, Solid.

In 1983–1984, Catapult musicians Aart Mol, Cees Bergman, Elmer Veerhoff, Erwin van Prehn and Geertjan Hessing (under the pseudonym "Adams & Fleisner") wrote and produced "Woodpeckers from Space" by Video Kids, a synth-pop cover of "The Woody Woodpecker Song". Released on 4 September 1984, the song became a number 1 hit in Spain and Norway. The idea for the song began when the children of Gert van den Bosch (co-founder of Boni Records) asked him if he could produce a record based on Woody Woodpecker, whom they were big fans of. The Woody laugh used in the song was first heard in "Let's Break" by Master Genius in 1983, another Cat Music project. The band's animated mascot, a "spacepecker" named Tico Tac, was created and used in place of Woody in order to avoid a lawsuit from Universal. The band lasted from 1984 to 1988.

The Baltimora song "Woody Boogie", released in 1985, notably features a synthesizer replaying Woody Woodpecker's laugh, which is incorporated into the chorus as well as other parts of the song.

Woody was number 46 on TV Guide's list of the 50 Greatest Cartoon Characters of All Time in 2002 and 2003. He came in at number 25 on Animal Planet's list of The 50 Greatest Movie Animals in 2004. The character has been referenced and spoofed on many later television programs, among them The Simpsons, American Dad!, South Park, The Fairly OddParents, Family Guy, Seinfeld, Robot Chicken, Three's Company, and Flash Toons.

Like Bugs Bunny for Warner Bros., Sonic the Hedgehog for Sega, Mario for Nintendo and Mickey Mouse for Disney, Woody Woodpecker serves as the official mascot of Universal Pictures. In 1998 and 1999, Woody appeared on the nose of the Williams Formula One Team, and in 2000, he became the official team mascot of the Honda Motorcycle Racing Team. A Woody Woodpecker balloon had been a staple of the Macy's Thanksgiving Day Parade from 1982 until 1996.

In Brazil, the character is a hugely popular and iconic cartoon character.

== Home media ==
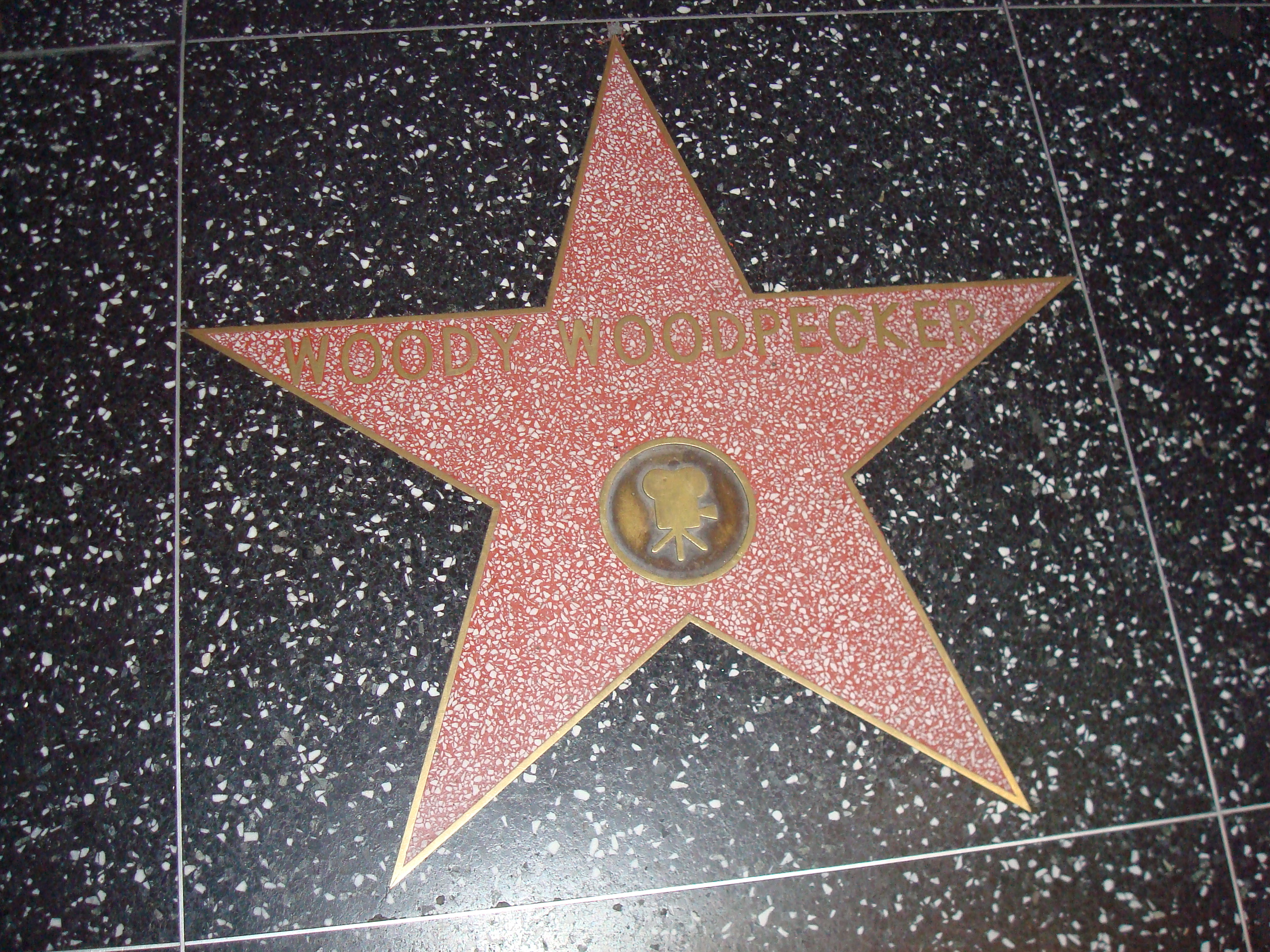
Woody Woodpecker's star on the Hollywood Walk of Fame

A handful of non-comprehensive Woody Woodpecker VHS tapes were issued by Universal in the 1980s and 1990s, usually including Andy Panda and Chilly Willy cartoons as bonuses. A few were widely released on VHS in the mid-1980s by Kid Pics Video, an American company of dubious legality, which packaged the Woody cartoons with bootlegged Disney cartoons. In the early 2000s, a series of mail-order Woody Woodpecker Show VHS tapes and DVDs were made available by mail order through Columbia House.

In 2007, Universal Pictures Home Entertainment released The Woody Woodpecker and Friends Classic Cartoon Collection, a three-disc DVD boxed set compilation of Walter Lantz "Cartunes". The first forty-five Woody Woodpecker shorts from Knock Knock to The Great Who-Dood-It were presented in the box set in chronological order of release, with various Chilly Willy, Andy Panda, Swing Symphonies, and other Lantz shorts also included. The Woody Woodpecker and Friends Classic Cartoon Collection: Volume 2, including the next forty-five Woody cartoons — Termites from Mars through Jittery Jester — was released in 2008. A plain-vanilla best-of release, titled Woody Woodpecker Favorites, was released in 2009, which contained no new-to-DVD material.

Woody Woodpecker shorts were released for the first time on Blu-ray on September 7, 2021; the set was labeled as the "Screwball Collection".

Another majority of his shorts, along with other shorts, was released on The Woody Woodpecker and Friends Golden Age Collection on January 20, 2026.

DVD/Blu-ray release name	Cartoon #	Release date
The Woody Woodpecker and Friends Classic Cartoon Collection (DVD)	45 Woody cartoons, 30 others	July 24, 2007
The Woody Woodpecker and Friends Classic Cartoon Collection: Volume 2 (DVD)	45 Woody cartoons, 30 others	April 15, 2008
Woody Woodpecker Favorites (DVD)	15 Woody cartoons, 5 others	March 10, 2009
Woody Woodpecker and Friends Halloween Favorites (DVD)	5 Woody cartoons, 1 other and 1 episode of The New Woody Woodpecker Show	September 2, 2014
Woody Woodpecker and Friends - Holiday Favorites (DVD)	1 Woody cartoon, 5 others and 1 episode of The New Woody Woodpecker Show	October 7, 2014
The Woody Woodpecker Screwball Collection (Blu-ray)	25 Woody cartoons	September 7, 2021
The Woody Woodpecker and Friends Golden Age Collection (Blu-ray)	8 Woody cartoons, 17 others	January 20, 2026

== Voice actors ==
United States

- Mel Blanc (cartoons: 1940–1941; archive recordings: 1942–1972; Capitol Records: 1948–1955)
- Bernard B. Brown (1941–1947; additional lines and vocal effects)
- Danny Webb (1941; Pantry Panic)
- Kent Rogers (1941–1943, gulping in Wild and Woody! (archive recording))
- Dick Nelson (1943, 1954; Ration Board, conscience in Under the Counter Spy)
- Ben Hardaway (1944–1949)
- Lee Sweetland (1944–1947; singing voice in The Barber of Seville, The Beach Nut, Ski for Two, Chew-Chew Baby, The Dippy Diplomat and Smoked Hams)
- Theodore von Eltz (1947; Sally in Hollywoodland [unaired radio pilot])
- Harry Babbitt (1948; "The Woody Woodpecker Song")
- Danny Kaye (1948; "The Woody Woodpecker Song" cover)
- Grace Stafford (1950–1991, 1995; Destination Moon, cartoons: 1950–1972; The Woody Woodpecker Show, commercials, 51st Academy Awards, Walter, Woody and the World of Animation, laughing in Let's All Recycle, Pepsi commercial (archive recording))
- Gladys Holland (1953; imitating Ga Ga Gazoo in Belle Boys)
- Dallas McKennon (1953, 1964, 1966; growling in Wrestling Wrecks, Indian voice disguise in Saddle-Sore Woody, monster sounds in Monster of Ceremonies)
- Hal Smith (1957; Woody Woodpecker Presents)
- Daws Butler (1963–1964, 1969, 1972; Indian voice disguise in Greedy Gabby Gator, imitating Homer's boss in Freeway Fracas, monster sound in Spook-a-Nanny, yelling in Little Skeeter, imitating Floyd Farkle in Pecking Holes in Poles)
- Benny Rubin (1963; with the Mad Professor's voice in Science Friction)
- Cherry Davis (1988; Who Framed Roger Rabbit)
- Dave Spafford (1991; 63rd Academy Awards)
- Jeff Bennett (1996; Animaniacs (as "Woodpeckerman"))
- Billy West (1998–2002; From the Earth to the Moon, The New Woody Woodpecker Show)
- Eric Kelso (2001; Universal Studios Japan, Universal Studios Theme Parks Adventure)
- Dan Castellaneta (2008; The Simpsons (as a parody named "Robby Robin"))
- Seth Green (2014; Robot Chicken)
- Eric Bauza (2017–2024; Woody Woodpecker (2017), Woody Woodpecker (2018), MeTV promotion, Woody Woodpecker Goes to Camp)

Other countries

- Katsue Miwa (Japan)
- Junko Hori (Japan; DVD dub)
- Koichi Yamadera (Japan; home video dub)
- Kumiko Watanabe (Japan)
- Azusa Ichiba (Japan, 2001; Animation Celebration)
- Olney Cazarré (Brazil) 1960s / 1980s
- Garcia Júnior (Brazil) 1970s
- Marco Antônio Costa (Brazil) 1990s / 2000s
- Sérgio Stern (Brazil) 2017–present
- Guy Piérauld (France) 1960s–2000
- Alessandro Bevilacqua (France, 2017; Woody Woodpecker)
- Geertjan Hessing (Netherlands, 1983; "Let's Break")
- Natalia Gurzo (Russia) 1996–1998/2000s
- Jorge Arvizu (Mexico)
- Stavros Mavridis (Greece) 2005–2007
- Dimitris Marizas (Greece) 2007–2009
- Dieter Kursawe (Germany)
- Mića Tatić (Yugoslavia/Serbia)

Blanc originated the voice, in a characterization similar to his Daffy Duck, minus the lisp, with the recording slightly sped up to give a higher-pitched tone to the voice. He stated that the laugh originated from a type of laugh he used to do at school and he just added the pecking sounds to the laugh. That practice continued with other voice artists.

== Filmography ==
=== TV series ===
Series number	Title	Broadcast run	Original channel	Total # episodes	Total # seasons
1	The Woody Woodpecker Show	1957–1997	ABC, NBC, syndication	113 episodes	5
2	The New Woody Woodpecker Show	1999–2002	Fox Kids	53 episodes	3
3	Woody Woodpecker	2018–2022	YouTube	30 episodes	3

=== Public service ===
- Let's All Recycle with Woody Woodpecker (1991 – PSA Video)

=== Other appearances ===
- Who Framed Roger Rabbit (1988, cameo)
- Kids for Character (1996)

=== Film ===
In the early 2010s, Universal Pictures and Illumination Entertainment planned a Woody Woodpecker feature film. John Altschuler and Dave Krinsky (King of the Hill) were in talks to develop a story, but the project was canceled. In 2013, Bill Kopp was attached to direct an animated feature film with three interwoven stories, but the project was later canceled.

A live-action/CGI hybrid film based on Woody Woodpecker, directed by Alex Zamm and starring Timothy Omundson and Brazilian actress Thaila Ayala, was released theatrically in Brazil on October 5, 2017, and was scheduled for release on April 1, 2018, worldwide. The film had a straight-to-video release in the United States on February 6, 2018. A sequel titled Woody Woodpecker Goes to Camp was released on Netflix on April 12, 2024.

== Comics ==
Woody was the star of a number of comic book series published in the U.S. and around the world. The main title, Walter Lantz Woody Woodpecker, ran from 1952 to 1983.

Woody first appeared as a comic book character in 1942, appearing alongside Andy Panda and Oswald the Lucky Rabbit in Dell Comics' New Funnies, an anthology comic that featured a number of other Lantz characters. Eventually, Woody became the star of New Funnies, leading to Woody Woodpecker solo comics appearing as part of Dell Comics' Four Color Comics one-shot series, beginning in 1947.

Walter Lantz Woody Woodpecker became an independent comic book (starting with issue #16 to reflect the earlier appearances in Four Color) in Dec. 1952-Jan. 1953. It ran for 201 issues, published by Dell and then Western Publishing (Whitman/Gold Key), lasting until 1983.

Woody's niece and nephew Splinter and Knothead first made their appearances in the comics, later appearing in the cartoons.

Notable creators involved with the Woody Woodpecker comic included Carl Fallberg, Paul Murry, Tony Strobl, Frank Thomas, and in the European comics, Freddy Milton.

Woody also starred in a short-lived comic strip, syndicated by Consolidated News Features, in the early 1950s.

Foreign-language versions of the Woody Woodpecker comic were published in many European countries, most actively in Sweden ("Hacke Hackspett"), the Netherlands, France, and Italy ("Picchiarello").

== Video games ==
Several Woody Woodpecker video games were released for Mega Drive/Genesis, PlayStation, PlayStation 2, Microsoft Windows, Game Boy Color, Game Boy Advance, 3DO Interactive Multiplayer and iOS:

- Woody Woodpecker #1, Woody Woodpecker #2, and Woody Woodpecker #3 (1994) for the 3DO
- Férias Frustradas do Pica-Pau (translation: Woody Woodpecker Frustrated Vacation) (1996) for Mega Drive and Master System (made by Tectoy, sold only in Brazil)
- Woody Woodpecker Racing (2000) for PlayStation, Windows, and GBC
- Woody Woodpecker: Escape from Buzz Buzzard Park (2001) for GBC, Windows, and PS2
- Universal Studios Theme Parks Adventure (2001) for GameCube
- Woody Woodpecker in Crazy Castle 5 (2002) for GBA
- Woody Woodpecker: Wacky Challenge (2006) for mobile phone
- Woody Woodpecker In Waterfools (2008) for mobile phone
- Woody Woodpecker (App) (2012) for iOS

Mattel purchased the rights for a Woody Woodpecker Intellivision game, and Grace Stafford recorded new dialog for the game, but was not completed.

Maruhon has released a series of pachinko games in Japan.

Woody Woodpecker appears as a park mascot in a Universal Studios themed Minecraft DLC map.

== See also ==
- Walter Lantz Productions
- List of Walter Lantz cartoon characters
- Mr. Horsepower, a broadly similar-looking company mascot
