= Gabby Gator =

Animated cartoon character

- Woody Woodpecker character
- Gabby Gator first appeared as a prototype in Everglade Raid.
- First appearance: Everglade Raid; August 11, 1958
- Last appearance: Corn Fed Up; June 15, 2002
- Created by: Walter Lantz
- Voiced by: Daws Butler (1958–1963); Jeff Glen Bennett (2002–present)

In-universe information
- Nickname: All. I. Gator
- Species: Alligator
- Gender: Male

Gabby Gator is an animated cartoon character, an anthropomorphic alligator who appeared in several cartoons produced by Walter Lantz and distributed by Universal Pictures.

Gabby lives in old lair in the Okiedokie Swamp, which is a play on Lake Okeechobee and is near Cape Canaveral. This place however does not have many food options, and so always hungry Gabby is forced to attract the food (usually Woody Woodpecker) to his home and attempt to capture him with anything he might have at hand, including highly advanced technology. Though Gabby Gator is intelligent and crafty, Woody always escapes, usually leaving Gabby hungry and with his home destroyed. The strangest thing about Gabby Gator is that he seems to have a vast supply of carrots, which are useless for a carnivorous reptile.

== Appearance ==
Gabby is an always hungry green alligator who has a yellowish-green body and snout. Depending on the episode, he wears a reddish-purple hat, a yellow vest, and has two fangs poking out of his muzzle. He speaks with a southern accent, similar to that of Hanna-Barbera's Huckleberry Hound.

== History ==
Gabby Gator first appeared as "All. I. Gator" in the 1958 short Everglade Raid. In that short, Gabby—or "All"—tries to cook Woody for lunch. "All" appeared again in 1959's Romp in a Swamp. Gabby's first official appearance under his definitive name was in Southern Fried Hospitality, when he hardly never ate and caught Woody to stave off his starvation.

Gabby did not become as famous as Woody's more renowned enemies such as Wally Walrus and Buzz Buzzard. His final theatrical appearance was in Greedy Gabby Gator in 1963. Ms. Meany more or less replaced him as the recurring villain at that moment.

== Later appearance ==
Gabby Gator later appeared in The New Woody Woodpecker Show in the episode "Corn Fed Up".

== List of Gabby Gator's appearances ==
- Everglade Raid (1958)
- Romp in a Swamp (1959)
- Southern Fried Hospitality (1960)
- Gabby's Diner (1961)
- Woody's Kook-Out (1961)
- Rock-a-Bye Gator (1962)
- Rocket Racket (1962)
- Voo-Doo Boo-Boo (1962)
- Little Woody Riding Hood (1962)
- Greedy Gabby Gator (1963)
