= Jack Mather =

American radio and television actor (1907–1966)

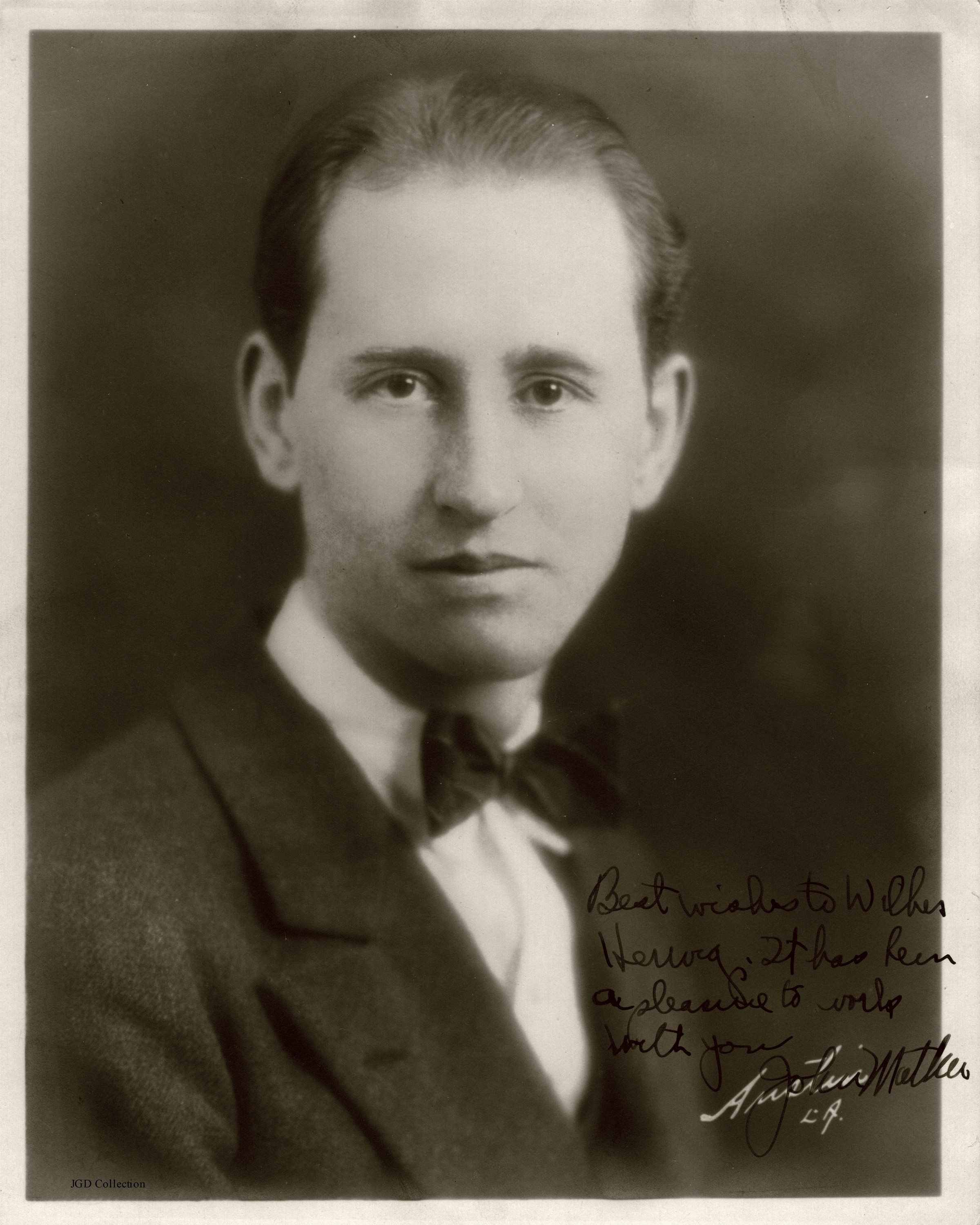
- Born: John E. Mather; September 7, 1907; Illinois, U.S.
- Died: August 16, 1966 (aged 58); Wauconda, Illinois, U.S.
- Occupations: Actor, voice actor
- Years active: 1929–1966
- Spouse: Rosalie Encell Mather
- Children: 2

John Eugene Mather (September 7, 1907 – August 16, 1966) was an American radio and television actor, best known for playing The Cisco Kid on radio and for being the original voice of Wally Walrus.

== Early life and career ==
Mather was born on a farm outside Chicago, Illinois, to John A. and Ella Mather.

One of Mather's earliest roles in entertainment was performing on radio in Chicago as half of a musical duet. Having been a cast member of the First Nighter radio show, he moved to Los Angeles when the show also moved to Los Angeles. Throughout his career, he appeared on popular radio shows including The Jack Benny Program, Lux Radio Theatre, Fibber McGee and Molly, and The Phil Harris-Alice Faye Show.

In animation, Mather occasionally did voice work for George Pal and UPA. In 1943, Walter Lantz cast Mather as Woody Woodpecker's nemesis, Wally Walrus for The Beach Nut (1944). Giving Wally a Swedish accent, Mather maintained the role until Walter Lantz Productions temporarily shut down in 1948. Dallas McKennon and Paul Frees later took over the role following the studio's reopening in 1950.

He also occasionally appeared in films, including The Bravados (1958) and Some Like It Hot (1959).

In 1959, Mather played legendary cattleman Charles Goodnight in the episode, "Old Blue", of the syndicated television anthology series, Death Valley Days, hosted by Stanley Andrews. The episode focuses on Goodnight's lead steer, Old Blue, who is stolen and thereafter adopted as a family pet.

Mather appeared as crooked Judge Hardy in an episode of Maverick in 1959 titled "The Sheriff of Duck'n'Shoot" opposite James Garner and Jack Kelly as Bret and Bart Maverick, and as Col. O'Hearn the following year on Maverick again in the episode "Thunder from the North" starring Roger Moore as Beau Maverick. He also appeared on two other ABC Warner Brothers series, 77 Sunset Strip with Efrem Zimbalist Jr. and Surfside 6. In his last television role in 1962, he was cast as Frank Lathrop in "The Daniel Clay Story" on the Western series Wagon Train with John McIntire.

== The Cisco Kid ==
In 1946, Mather was cast in the title role of Mutual's adaptation of The Cisco Kid, opposite Harry E. Lang as Pancho. The series, which was pre-recorded, ran from 1946 to 1956 and for more than seven hundred episodes. In addition to playing Cisco, Mather also was the announcer for the program in its later years.

== Personal life ==
Mather was married to Rosalie Encell and was the father of two sons Gregory Alan Mather (December 6, 1939 – March 9, 2025) who was a former football star and Robert who managed a cattle ranch.

== Death ==
On August 16, 1966, Mather died in Wauconda, Illinois, of a heart attack. He was cremated and his ashes were scattered in Libertyville, Illinois where he grew up.
