= Ski for Two =

- Directed by: James Culhane
- Story by: Ben Hardaway; Milt Schaffer
- Produced by: Walter Lantz
- Starring: Jack Mather; Ben Hardaway; Lee Sweetland
- Music by: Darrell Calker
- Animation by: Don Williams; Grim Natwick; Dick Lundy (unc.); Emery Hawkins (unc.); Les Kline (unc.); Paul Smith (unc.); Laverne Harding (unc.); Pat Matthews (unc.)
- Layouts by: Art Heinemann
- Backgrounds by: Philip DeGuard
- Color process: Technicolor
- Production company: Walter Lantz Productions
- Distributed by: Universal Pictures
- Release date: November 13, 1944
- Running time: 6:44
- Country: United States
- Language: English

Ski for Two is a 1944 Woody Woodpecker "cartune" directed by James Culhane. Released theatrically on November 13, 1944, the film was produced by Walter Lantz Productions and distributed by Universal Pictures.

== Plot ==
Woody is sifting through some travel magazines when he spots a tempting ad for the Swiss Chard Lodge. The lodge is situated in Idaho, and offers dining for its guests. Woody is ecstatic, and promptly books a train ticket. After disembarking at the train station at Sunstroke Valley, it becomes apparent that the lodge is still an additional 40 miles, with no adjacent roads or any form of transportation. Woody decides to take matters into his own hands by taking a short cut, skiing and singing his way through the mountains.

Upon Woody's arrival, lodge owner Wally Walrus (Jack Mather) advises that the lodge does not accept walk-in guests; he points out a sign next to the front door that says, "Positively No Accommodations Without A Reservation". Woody, of course, was lured in by the promise of "excellent food" and did not bother to inquire about such a rule before showing up. Drawn by the aroma of the warm food inside the lodge, Woody gains entry by disguising himself as Santa Claus. Wally is so excited at the prospect of Kris Kringle arriving that he quickly adorns the lodge with Christmas decorations. It does not take long, though, for the skeptical walrus to discover that it is, in fact, only October, making Santa's arrival somewhat premature.

Woody manages to stuff his Santa toy sack with food from the lodge, and starts singing and skiing his way down the mountain. Upon opening the sack, however, Woody discovers a vengeful Wally Walrus who wrings the little woodpecker's neck in disgust and mocks Woody's trademark laugh.

== Voice cast ==
- Ben Hardaway as Woody Woodpecker
  - Lee Sweetland as Woody Woodpecker (singing voice)
  - Mel Blanc as Woody Woodpecker (laugh)
- Jack Mather as Wally Walrus

== Production notes ==
The title Ski for Two is a pun on the song title "Tea for Two", featured in the 1925 musical No, No, Nanette.

The song Woody performs while skiing to the Swiss Chard Lodge is called "The Sleigh (a la Russe)" (written in 1926 by Richard Kountz and Ivor Tchervanow). According to James Culhane, the composition was used with the belief that it was in the public domain, later to discover that the copyright was still in effect. Lantz sent $50 to the publishing firm for its use in the film. They sent a letter back stating that they would only accept nothing less than a hundred dollars, an amount that Lantz gladly paid. Lee Sweetland, previously the singing voice for Woody in The Barber of Seville, supplied his vocals again for the scene. In one of the surviving dialogue sheets, a noted inscription states "have Sweetland sing Woody's laugh", which he performs near the end.
