= Universal Studios Theme Parks Adventure =

2001 video game

- North American cover art
- Developer: Nai'a Digital Works
- Publisher: Kemco
- Director: Mikio Ueyama
- Composers: Akihito Okawa; Houzou Okazaki
- Platform: GameCube
- Release: JP: December 7, 2001; NA: December 18, 2001; PAL: May 3, 2002
- Genre: Party
- Modes: Single-player, multiplayer

Universal Studios Theme Parks Adventure, known in Japan as Universal Studios Japan Adventure (ユニバーサル・スタジオ・ジャパン・アドベンチャー, Yunibāsaru Sutajio Japan Adobenchā), is a 2001 party video game developed by Nai'a Digital Works and published by Kemco for the GameCube. Set at the Universal Studios Japan park, the object of the game is to explore the park and complete several mini-games loosely based on the real-life attractions. The game was released in Japan on December 7, 2001 to negative reviews, being criticized for its tedious gameplay, poor graphics and anomalous concept.

== Gameplay ==
The object of the game is to collect stamps by going on rides throughout the park. To get on the rides, the player must earn points by picking up trash around the park and putting it into trash cans. The player can also meet and shake hands with costumed characters inside the park for additional points. Points can then be spent on merchandise from the attractions, which are required to get on the rides. Rides include Back to the Future: The Ride, Jaws, Jurassic Park River Adventure, E.T. Adventure, Backdraft, Wild, Wild, Wild West Stunt Show, and Waterworld. Players must earn a target score on these rides to earn a stamp for completion. Minigames, hosted by Woody Woodpecker, include a Universal Studios quiz of film-related questions and puzzle games such as Concentration (memory match).

The park features pre-rendered backgrounds and uses a fixed camera that does not move or zoom in with the player. There are set camera vantages that the player moves in and out of by going outside of the field of view to go to the next camera point.

== Release and reception ==
Reception

Aggregate scores
Aggregator	Score
GameRankings	34.47%
Metacritic	39/100

Review scores
Publication	Score
Electronic Gaming Monthly	4.5/10
Famitsu	5/10, 5/10, 5/10, 5/10
Game Informer	4/10
GameSpot	3.5/10
GameSpy	6/10
IGN	3/10

Universal Studios Theme Parks was released in Japan for the GameCube on December 7, 2001.

The game was heavily criticized. Matt Casamassina of IGN criticized the game's graphics, comparing it to a "bad N64 game", and noted that the game still suffered frame-rate issues. Brad Shoemaker of GameSpot criticized it in his review, saying: "The game is too frustrating and convoluted for kids to have any fun with it, and all but the most desperate adult GameCube fans will find it tedious and unentertaining as well." Matt Casamassina of IGN also criticized it, calling it "a jumbled mess of disorganized goals, sloppy navigation and boring destinations topped off with incredibly dated graphics and an overall adventure that can fairly easily be beaten, if one has the stomach for it" and concluded: "Not recommended for young or adult gamers." It remained NGC Magazine UK's lowest-rated GameCube game until surpassed by Batman: Dark Tomorrow, which, unlike Universal Studios Theme Parks Adventure, is often cited as one of the worst video games ever made.
