= Thaila Ayala =

Brazilian actress and model (born 1986)

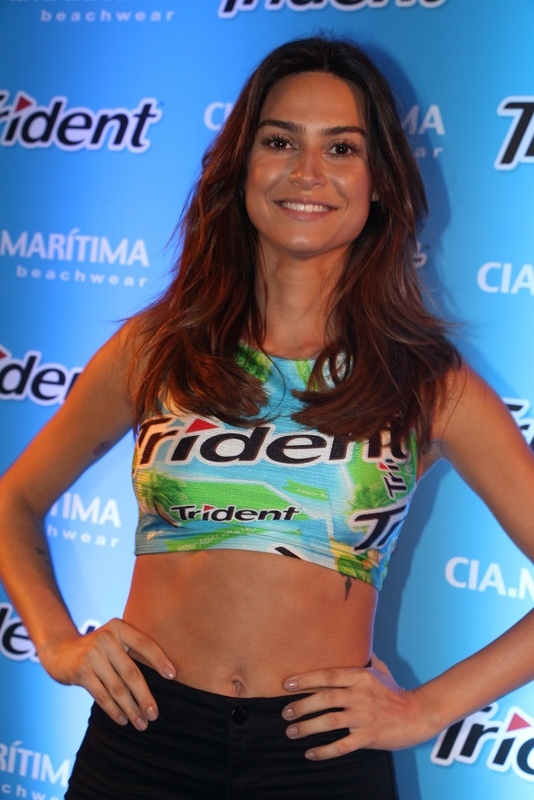
- Ayala at the Cia Marítima and Trident collection parade in 2015
- Born: Thaila Ayala Sales; April 14, 1986 (age 40); Presidente Prudente, São Paulo, Brazil
- Occupations: Actress; model
- Years active: 2002–present
- Spouses: Paulo Vilhena (m. 2011; div. 2013) Renato Góes (m. 2019)
- Children: 2
- Parent: Maria Eunice Ayala (mother)
- Website: http://thailaayala.com.br/

Thaila Ayala Sales (Brazilian Portuguese: [ˈtajlɐ aˈjalɐ]; born April 14, 1986) is a Brazilian actress and model.

== Career ==
Ayala began her modeling career at the age of sixteen. In 2006, she enrolled in the Rede Globo Actors Workshop. At the end of the course, she did tests, and got the role of Marcela, the female protagonist of the fourteenth season of the telenovela Malhação.

In 2007, Ayala was photographed by Terry Richardson for the book, Rio, Wonderful Town, which was released later that same year. She was featured in a photo with her breast showing and biting her lip. Casting producer Luis Fernando Silva later claimed to have repented for participation in the book.

In January 2016, Ayala worked with Indian-American Director Aditya J Patwardhan in the upcoming short film When Red is White, aka The Touch of Aurora.

In 2017, Ayala played Vanessa in the 2017 American film Woody Woodpecker, collaborating with Eric Bauza, Timothy Omundson, Graham Verchere.

== Personal life ==
Ayala married Brazilian actor Paulo Vilhena on November 19, 2011. They split in 2013. In August 2016, Ayala converted to Protestantism and was baptized at the Igreja Pentecostal Anabatista. She is of Italian and Spanish descent. In 2019, she married actor Renato Góes. They have two children.

== Filmography ==
=== Television ===
Year	Title	Role	Notes	Ref.
2006	Páginas da Vida	Felipe's girlfriend	Episode: October 12	
2006	Malhação	Marcela Junqueira Pereira da Silva "Marcela Persí"/ Vanessa Galvão	Season 13	
2007	Malhação	Marcela Junqueira Pereira da Silva "Marcela Persí"	Season 14	
2008	Faça Sua História	Kênia	Episode: "Bandeira 5"	
2009	Caminho das Índias	Shivani Mugdaliar		
2010	Ti Ti Ti	Amanda Moura		
2012	Cheias de Charme	Gisele / Fabiene	Episode: "September 5–6"	
2013	Sangue Bom	Camila Lancaster		
2014	(Des)encontros	Lara	Episode: "Lara e Gael"	
2015	As Canalhas	Danielle	Episode: "Danielle"	
2019-2020	Girls from Ipanema	Helô		
2024	Família É Tudo	Elisa		

=== Film ===
Year	Title	Role	Notes	Ref.
2014	Apnéia	Julia	Short film	
2015	Foreign Tongues	Mariana	Short film	
2016	Stronger than the World	Laura		
2016	Tesla: Drive the Future	Girl	Short film	
2016	Water Warrior	Woman interviewed	Short film	
2017	Sex.Sound.Silence	Thaila	Short film	
2017	O Matador	Renata		
2017	Woody Woodpecker	Vanessa		
2018	When Red is White	Sara	Short film	
2018	Talvez uma História de Amor	Clara		
2018	Coração de Cowboy	Paula		
2019	Lamento	Letícia		
2019	Zeroville	Maria		
2021	Moscow	Val		
2022	Inverno	Beatriz		

== Awards and nominations ==
Year	Ceremony	Category	Work nominated	Results
2007	Prêmio Extra de Televisão	Feminine Revelation	Malhação	Nominated
2009	Capricho Awards	Most Stylish National	Thaila Ayala	Nominated
2010	Capricho Awards	Most Stylish	Thaila Ayala	Nominated
