= Woody Woodpecker filmography =

Filmography

This is a list of animated cartoons that star Woody Woodpecker, who appeared in 204 cartoons (195 Woody shorts and 9 miscellaneous shorts) during and after the Golden age of American animation. All the cartoons were produced by Walter Lantz Productions, and were distributed by Universal Pictures, United Artists and Universal International. Also listed are miscellaneous cartoons that feature Woody but are not a part of the main short series.

== 1940s ==
= Academy Award nominee/winner

=== 1940 ===
#	Title	Date	Director	Notes
N/A	Knock Knock	November 25	Walter Lantz	An Andy Panda short. First appearance of Woody Woodpecker.

=== 1941 ===
#	Title	Date	Director	Notes
1	Woody Woodpecker	July 7	Walter Lantz	Woody's first solo short.; First use of Woody's name.
2	The Screwdriver	August 11	Walter Lantz	The second-to-last Woody Woodpecker short to feature Mel Blanc as Woody's speaking voice.
3	Pantry Panic	November 24	Walter Lantz	The only Woody Woodpecker short to feature both Mel Blanc and Danny Webb as Woody's speaking voice; Blanc had recorded some lines for this short prior to leaving the Lantz studio to work exclusively for Warner Bros. Cartoons, so Webb was hired to finish Woody's remaining lines.; The only Woody Woodpecker short in the public domain as of 2026.
N/A	$21 a Day (Once a Month)	December 1	Walter Lantz	Cameo appearance. A Swing Symphony short.

=== 1942 ===
#	Title	Date	Director	Notes
4	The Hollywood Matador	February 9	Alex Lovy	First Woody short directed by Alex Lovy.; First Woody short to feature Kent Rogers as Woody's voice.
5	Ace in the Hole	June 22	Alex Lovy	
6	The Loan Stranger	October 19	Alex Lovy	

=== 1943 ===
#	Title	Date	Director	Notes
7	The Screwball	February 15	Alex Lovy	
8	The Dizzy Acrobat	May 31	Alex Lovy	Final Woody short to feature Kent Rogers as Woody's voice. Final appearance of Woody with green tail feathers and without his gloves.
9	Ration Bored	July 26	Emery Hawkins; Milt Schaffer	The only Woody Woodpecker short to feature Dick Nelson as Woody's voice.; The only Woody Woodpecker short directed by Emery Hawkins and Milt Schaffer.; First appearance of Woody with a blue tail and white gloves.

=== 1944 ===
#	Title	Date	Director	Notes
10	The Barber of Seville	April 10	James Culhane	First Woody short directed by James Culhane.; First Woody short to feature Ben Hardaway as Woody's voice.; First cartoon featuring Woody's updated design by Art Heinemann.; Last cartoon where Woody had green eyes until 1947.
11	The Beach Nut	October 16	James Culhane	First appearance of Wally Walrus.; First cartoon where Woody had blue eyes.
12	Ski for Two	November 13	James Culhane	

=== 1945 ===
#	Title	Date	Director	Notes
13	Chew-Chew Baby	February 5	James Culhane	
14	Woody Dines Out	May 14	James Culhane	
15	The Dippy Diplomat	August 27	James Culhane	
16	The Loose Nut	December 17	James Culhane	

=== 1946 ===
#	Title	Date	Director	Notes
17	Who's Cookin' Who?	June 24	James Culhane	First appearance of Wolfie Wolf.
18	Bathing Buddies	July 1	Dick Lundy	First Woody short directed by Dick Lundy.
19	The Reckless Driver	August 26	James Culhane	
20	Fair Weather Fiends	November 18	James Culhane	Final Woody short directed by James Culhane.; Last cartoon to have Woody with blue eyes.

=== 1947 ===
#	Title	Date	Director	Notes
N/A	Musical Moments from Chopin	February 24	Dick Lundy	First cartoon where Woody had green eyes again. This short belongs to the Musical Miniatures series, also starring Andy Panda.
21	Smoked Hams	April 28	Dick Lundy	Re-released in 1991 with Problem Child 2.
22	The Coo Coo Bird	June 9	Dick Lundy	
23	Well Oiled	June 30	Dick Lundy	
24	Solid Ivory	August 25	Dick Lundy	
25	Woody the Giant Killer	December 15	Dick Lundy	Final Woody short distributed by Universal Pictures until 1950.

=== 1948 ===
Starting this year until the studio's hiatus, all shorts are distributed by United Artists.

#	Title	Date	Director	Notes
26	The Mad Hatter	February 16	Dick Lundy	First Woody short distributed by United Artists.
27	Banquet Busters	March 3	Dick Lundy	Featuring Andy Panda.
28	Wacky-Bye Baby	May 2	Dick Lundy	
29	Wet Blanket Policy	August 27	Dick Lundy	First appearance of Buzz Buzzard. First cartoon to use the Woody Woodpecker theme. Nominated at the 21st Academy Awards for Best Music (Song) for "The Woody Woodpecker Song", written by Ramey Idriss and George Tibbles. This is the only short film of any kind to ever receive an Oscar nomination in the Song category.
30	Wild and Woody!	December 31	Dick Lundy	Submitted and screened at the 21st Academy Awards for an Oscar consideration, but was not nominated.

=== 1949 ===
#	Title	Date	Director	Notes
31	Drooler's Delight	March 25	Dick Lundy	Final Woody short distributed by United Artists.; Final Woody short produced before a one-year hiatus.; Final Woody short to feature Ben Hardaway as Woody's voice.; Final Woody short to feature Woody's crest backwards until 1999.

== 1950s ==
=== 1950 ===
Starting this year, all shorts are distributed by Universal International.

#	Title	Date	Director	Notes
N/A	Destination Moon	June 27	Walter Lantz	Animated segment for an independent feature film produced by George Pal and directed by Irving Pichel.; First time Grace Stafford provides Woody's voice.; First Walter Lantz production after the studio's brief closure in 1949.; One of the last Woody Woodpecker shorts to use Mel Blanc's laugh.

=== 1951 ===
#	Title	Date	Director	Notes
32	Puny Express	January 22	Walter Lantz; Dick Lundy	First Woody produced after hiatus.; First Woody short featuring Woody's crest forwards.; First Woody short to feature Grace Stafford's Woody Woodpecker laugh, though Mel Blanc's version of the laugh is also heard at one point.; First Woody short distributed once again by Universal, under the 1947-63 Universal International banner.
33	Sleep Happy	March 26	Walter Lantz; Dick Lundy	Final Woody short directed by Dick Lundy; Walter Lantz has claimed to have completed Lundy's uncompleted work. Final short to be written by Ben Hardaway and Heck Allen.
34	Wicket Wacky	May 28	Walter Lantz	First short without any involvement from Ben Hardaway.
35	Slingshot 6 7/8	July 23	Walter Lantz	First pairing of Buzz Buzzard and Wally Walrus. Submitted and screened at the 24th Academy Awards for an Oscar consideration, but was not nominated.
36	The Redwood Sap	October 1	Walter Lantz	
37	The Woody Woodpecker Polka	October 29	Walter Lantz	Featuring Andy Panda and Oswald Rabbit. Mel Blanc's version of Woody's laugh is used for the final time in this short; albeit during the song this short is named after.
38	Destination Meatball	December 24	Walter Lantz	

=== 1952 ===
#	Title	Date	Director	Notes
39	Born to Peck	February 25	Walter Lantz	
40	Stage Hoax	April 21	Walter Lantz	First cartoon with new dialogue spoken by Woody.
41	Woodpecker in the Rough	June 16	Walter Lantz	
42	Scalp Treatment	September 8	Walter Lantz	Final Woody short directed by Walter Lantz.
43	The Great Who-Dood-It	October 20	Don Patterson	First Woody short directed by Don Patterson. First cartoon where staff were credited in the end.
44	Termites from Mars	December 8	Don Patterson	Submitted and screened at the 25th Academy Awards for an Oscar consideration, but was not nominated.

=== 1953 ===
#	Title	Date	Director	Notes
45	What's Sweepin'	January 5	Don Patterson	
46	Buccaneer Woodpecker	April 20	Don Patterson	
47	Operation Sawdust	June 15	Don Patterson	Final pairing of Buzz Buzzard and Wally Walrus.; Final appearance of Wally Walrus until 1961.
48	Wrestling Wrecks	July 20	Don Patterson	Last cartoon where staff were credited in the end.
49	Belle Boys	September 14	Don Patterson	
50	Hypnotic Hick	September 26	Don Patterson	First and only Woody Woodpecker short in 3D; released with Wings of the Hawk 3D. First to use the most iconic version of the Woody theme until 1961. Submitted and screened at the 26th Academy Awards for an Oscar consideration, but was not nominated.
51	Hot Noon (or 12 O'Clock for Sure)	November 15	Paul Smith	First Woody short directed by Paul Smith.

=== 1954 ===
#	Title	Date	Director	Notes
52	Socko in Morocco	January 18	Don Patterson	
53	Alley to Bali	March 15	Don Patterson	
54	Under the Counter Spy	May 10	Don Patterson	
55	Hot Rod Huckster	July 5	Don Patterson	
56	Real Gone Woody	September 20	Paul Smith	First appearance of Winnie Woodpecker.; Story by Michael Maltese.
57	A Fine Feathered Frenzy	October 25	Don Patterson	
58	Convict Concerto	November 22	Don Patterson	Final Woody short directed by Don Patterson.

=== 1955 ===
#	Title	Date	Director	Notes
59	Helter Shelter	January 17	Paul Smith	
60	Witch Crafty	March 14	Paul Smith	
61	Private Eye Pooch	May 9	Paul Smith	First appearance of Professor Dingledong.
62	Bedtime Bedlam	July 4	Paul Smith	
63	Square Shootin' Square	September 26	Paul Smith	First appearance of Dapper Denver Dooley.; Story by Michael Maltese.
64	Bunco Busters	November 21	Paul Smith	Final appearance of Buzz Buzzard until 1969.; Last cartoon where Woody had green eyes until 1999.
65	The Tree Medic	December 19	Alex Lovy	First Woody short for the decade directed by Alex Lovy.; First cartoon where Woody had black eyes.

=== 1956 ===
#	Title	Date	Director	Notes
66	After the Ball	February 13	Paul Smith	
67	Get Lost	March 12	Paul Smith	First appearances of Knothead and Splinter.
68	Chief Charlie Horse	May 7	Paul Smith	
69	Woodpecker from Mars	July 2	Paul Smith	
70	Calling All Cuckoos	September 24	Paul Smith	Submitted and screened at the 29th Academy Awards for an Oscar consideration, but was not nominated.
71	Niagara Fools	October 22	Paul Smith	Shown after the 2017 film.
72	Arts and Flowers	November 19	Paul Smith	
73	Woody Meets Davy Crewcut	December 17	Alex Lovy	

=== 1957 ===
#	Title	Date	Director	Notes
74	Red Riding Hoodlum	February 11	Paul Smith	Final appearance of Wolfie Wolf.
75	Box Car Bandit	April 8	Paul Smith	Submitted and screened at the 30th Academy Awards for an Oscar consideration, but was not nominated.
76	The Unbearable Salesman	June 3	Paul Smith	
77	International Woodpecker	July 1	Paul Smith	Final appearance of Winnie Woodpecker.
78	To Catch a Woodpecker	July 29	Alex Lovy	
79	Round Trip to Mars	September 23	Paul Smith	
80	Dopey Dick the Pink Whale	November 1	Paul Smith	
81	Fodder and Son	November 4	Paul Smith	First appearance of Windy & Breezy.

=== 1958 ===
#	Title	Date	Director	Notes
82	Misguided Missile	January 27	Paul Smith	First time Grace Stafford receives on-screen credit for providing Woody's voice.
83	Watch the Birdie	February 24	Alex Lovy	
84	Half Empty Saddles	April 21	Paul Smith	First appearance of Sugarfoot in a Woody short.
85	His Better Elf	July 14	Paul Smith	
86	Everglade Raid	August 11	Paul Smith	First appearance of All I. Gator.
87	Tree's a Crowd	September 8	Paul Smith	
88	Jittery Jester	November 3	Paul Smith	The most recent Woody Woodpecker short remastered and released on DVD. Submitted and screened at the 31st Academy Awards for an Oscar consideration, but was not nominated.

=== 1959 ===
#	Title	Date	Director	Notes
89	Tomcat Combat	March 2	Paul Smith	First appearance of Inspector Willoughby in a Woody short.
90	Log Jammed	April 20	Paul Smith	Ending is reminiscent of The Legend of Rockabye Point, a Chilly Willy short.
91	Panhandle Scandal	May 18	Alex Lovy	
92	Woodpecker in the Moon	July 13	Alex Lovy	
93	The Tee Bird	August 10	Paul Smith	Final appearance of Dapper Denver Dooley.
94	Romp in a Swamp	October 5	Paul Smith	Final appearance of All I. Gator.
95	Kiddie League	November 3	Paul Smith	Final appearance of Inspector Willoughby in a Woody short. One briefly seen character resembles Mad magazine mascot Alfred E. Neuman.

== 1960s ==
=== 1960 ===
#	Title	Date	Director	Notes
96	Billion Dollar Boner	January 5	Alex Lovy	
97	Pistol Packin' Woodpecker	March 2	Paul Smith	
98	Heap Big Hepcat	March 30	Paul Smith	
99	Ballyhooey	April 20	Alex Lovy	Final Woody short directed by Alex Lovy.
100	How to Stuff a Woodpecker	May 18	Paul Smith	Final appearance of Professor Dingledong.
101	Bats in the Belfry	June 16	Paul Smith	
102	Ozark Lark	July 13	Paul Smith	
103	Southern Fried Hospitality	November 28	Jack Hannah	First Woody short directed by Jack Hannah.; First appearance of Gabby Gator.; Submitted and screened at the 33rd Academy Awards for an Oscar consideration, but was not nominated.
104	Fowled Up Falcon	December 20	Paul Smith	

=== 1961 ===
#	Title	Date	Director	Notes
105	Poop Deck Pirate	January 10	Jack Hannah	
106	The Bird Who Came to Dinner	March 7	Paul Smith	
107	Gabby's Diner	March 28	Jack Hannah	
108	Sufferin' Cats	May 30	Paul Smith	
109	Franken-Stymied	July 4	Jack Hannah	Last cartoon to use the orchestral Woody theme.
110	Busman's Holiday	July 25	Paul Smith	
111	Phantom of the Horse Opera	September 26	Paul Smith	First appearance of Dirty McNasty.
112	Woody's Kook-Out	October 17	Jack Hannah	

=== 1962 ===
#	Title	Date	Director	Notes
113	Rock-a-Bye Gator	January 9	Jack Hannah	
114	Home Sweet Homewrecker	January 30	Paul Smith	
115	Room and Bored	March 6	Paul Smith	First appearance of Smedley Dog in a Woody short.
116	Rocket Racket	April 24	Jack Hannah	
117	Careless Caretaker	May 29	Paul Smith	Final appearance of Smedley Dog in a Woody short.
118	Tragic Magic	July 3	Paul Smith	
N/A	Hyde and Sneak	July 24	Paul Smith	Cameo on an Inspector Willoughby short.
119	Voo-Doo Boo-Boo	August 14	Jack Hannah	Final Woody short directed by Jack Hannah.
120	Little Woody Riding Hood	September 25	Paul Smith	First cartoon to use the third and final rendition of the "Woody Woodpecker Song", a new jazzy theme which featured a xylophone, prominent trumpet and low flute riff. This theme would last until the last short in 1972, when the Walter Lantz studio closed down.
121	Crowin' Pains	October 16	Paul Smith	

=== 1963 ===
#	Title	Date	Director	Notes
122	Robin Hoody Woody	February 12	Paul Smith	
123	Stowaway Woody	March 5	Sid Marcus	Directorial debut for Sid Marcus.
124	Greedy Gabby Gator	March 26	Sid Marcus	Final appearance of Gabby Gator.
125	Shutter Bug	May 7	Paul Smith	
126	Coy Decoy	July 9	Sid Marcus	
127	The Tenant's Racket	August 30	Sid Marcus	
128	Short in the Saddle	September 20	Paul Smith	
129	Tepee for Two	October 29	Sid Marcus	
130	Science Friction	December 3	Sid Marcus	
131	Calling Dr. Woodpecker	December 24	Paul Smith	First appearance of Mrs. Meany.

=== 1964 ===
#	Title	Date	Director	Notes
132	Dumb Like a Fox	January 7	Sid Marcus	First appearance of Fink Fox. Final Woody short under the "Universal International" banner. Starting with the next short "Saddle Sore Woody" the Universal Pictures banner is used in all of the Lantz cartoons until 1972.
133	Saddle Sore Woody	April 7	Paul Smith	First Woody short under the "Universal Pictures" banner.
134	Freeway Fracas	June 9	Paul Smith	
135	Skinfolks	July 7	Sid Marcus	
136	Woody's Clip Joint	August 3	Sid Marcus	
N/A	Roof Top Razzle-Dazzle	September 29	Paul Smith	Cameo in The Beary's Family Album short.
N/A	Spook-a-Nanny	October 21	Sid Marcus; Paul Smith	Final appearance of Smedley Dog, Andy Panda, and Wally Walrus in a Woody short, and also the only appearance of Homer Pigeon in a Woody short.
137	Get Lost! Little Doggy	October 27	Sid Marcus	First appearance of Duffy Dog.
138	Roamin' Roman	November 17	Paul Smith	

=== 1965 ===
Starting this year, all shorts carry the "Universal Pictures" banner.

#	Title	Date	Director	Notes
139	Three Little Woodpeckers	January 1	Sid Marcus	Submitted and screened at the 37th Academy Awards for an Oscar consideration, but was not nominated.
140	Woodpecker Wanted	February 1	Paul Smith	
N/A	Fractured Friendship	March 1	Sid Marcus	Cameo in Chilly Willy short.
141	Birds of a Feather	March 1	Sid Marcus	
142	Canned Dog Feud	April 1	Paul Smith	
143	Janie Get Your Gun	May 1	Paul Smith	
144	Sioux Me	May 1	Sid Marcus	Final appearance of Fink Fox.
145	What's Peckin'	July 1	Paul Smith	First appearance of Professor Grossenfibber.

=== 1966 ===
Starting with Lonesome Ranger, all shorts are directed by Paul Smith.

#	Title	Date	Director	Notes
146	Rough Riding Hood	January 1	Sid Marcus	Final Woody short directed by Sid Marcus.; Final Lantz short with animation by Ray Abrams and Art Davis.
147	Lonesome Ranger	February 1	Paul Smith	
148	Woody and the Beanstalk	March 1	Paul Smith	
149	Hassle in a Castle	March 1	Paul Smith	
150	The Big Bite	April 1	Paul Smith	
151	Astronut Woody	April 1	Paul Smith	
152	Practical Yolk	May 1	Paul Smith	
153	Monster of Ceremonies	June 1	Paul Smith	

=== 1967 ===
Starting with Hot Diggity Dog, all shorts are composed by Walter Greene.

#	Title	Date	Director	Notes
154	Sissy Sheriff	January 1	Paul Smith	
155	Have Gun, Can't Travel	February 1	Paul Smith	
156	The Nautical Nut	March 1	Paul Smith	
157	Hot Diggity Dog	March 1	Paul Smith	
158	Horse Play	April 1	Paul Smith	
159	Secret Agent Woody Woodpecker	May 1	Paul Smith	
N/A	Chilly Chums	June 1		Cameo on Chilly Willy short.

=== 1968 ===
#	Title	Date	Director	Notes
160	Lotsa Luck	January 1	Paul Smith	Final appearance of Dirty McNasty.
161	Woody the Freeloader	April 1	Paul Smith	
162	Fat in the Saddle	May 1	Paul Smith	
163	Feudin Fightin-N-Fussin	June 1	Paul Smith	
164	Peck of Trouble	July 1	Paul Smith	
165	A Lad in Bagdad	August 1	Paul Smith	
166	One Horse Town	October 1	Paul Smith	

=== 1969 ===
#	Title	Date	Director	Notes
167	Hook, Line and Stinker	January 1	Paul Smith	
168	Little Skeeter	March 1	Paul Smith	
169	Woody's Knight Mare	May 1	Paul Smith	
170	Tumble Weed Greed	June 1	Paul Smith	
171	Ship A'hoy Woody	August 1	Paul Smith	
172	Prehistoric Super Salesman	September 1	Paul Smith	Final appearance of Professor Grossenfibber; Dallas McKennon does not voice Grossenfibber, instead Daws Butler does.
173	Phoney Pony	November 1	Paul Smith	

== 1970s ==
=== 1970 ===
#	Title	Date	Director	Notes
174	Seal on the Loose	February 1	Paul Smith	
175	Wild Bill Hiccup	April 1	Paul Smith	
176	Coo Coo Nuts	July 1	Paul Smith	
177	Hi-Rise Wise Guys	August 1	Paul Smith	
178	Buster's Last Stand	October 1	Paul Smith	
179	All Hams on Deck	November 1	Paul Smith	
180	Flim Flam Fountain	December 1	Paul Smith	Final appearances of Knothead and Splinter.

=== 1971 ===
#	Title	Date	Director	Notes
181	The Reluctant Recruit	Jaunary 1	Paul Smith	
182	Sleepy Time Chimes	February 1	Paul Smith	
183	How to Trap a Woodpecker	April 1	Paul Smith	
184	Woody's Magic Touch	May 1	Paul Smith	
185	Kitty from the City	August 1	Paul Smith	
186	The Snoozin' Bruin	September 1	Paul Smith	
187	Shanghai Woody	September 1	Paul Smith	

=== 1972 ===
#	Title	Date	Director	Notes
188	Indian Corn	January 1	Paul Smith	
189	Gold Diggin' Woodpecker	February 1	Paul Smith	Final appearance of Sugarfoot in a Woody Woodpecker short. Final western-themed cartoon in the series.
190	Pecking Holes in Poles	March 1	Paul Smith	
191	Chili Con Corny	May 1	Paul Smith	
192	Show Biz Beagle	June 1	Paul Smith	
193	For the Love of Pizza	July 1	Paul Smith	
194	The Genie with the Light Touch	August 1	Paul Smith	Final appearance of Buzz Buzzard.
195	Bye, Bye, Blackboard	September 1	Paul Smith	Final appearances of Woody, Duffy Dog and Mrs. Meany.; Final Woody short directed by Paul Smith.; Final entry in the original series before the Lantz studio closed its doors forever.
