= Woody Woodpecker (2018 web series) =

American animated web series

- Genre: Comedy; Slapstick
- Based on: Woody Woodpecker by Universal Pictures & Walter Lantz
- Developed by: Alex Zamm
- Directed by: Alex Zamm (season 1); Mike Milo (seasons 2–3)
- Voices of: Eric Bauza; Tara Strong; Tom Kenny; Kevin Michael Richardson; Nika Futterman; Brad Norman (season 1); Dee Bradley Baker (seasons 2–3); Scott Weil
- Narrated by: Corey Burton
- Theme music composer: Alex Geringas
- Opening theme: "Woody Woodpecker Song" by George Tibbles & Ramey Idriss
- Ending theme: "Troublemaker" by George Tribbles & Ramey Idriss, performed by Blaze n Vill
- Composers: Alex Geringas (seasons 1-2); Karam Salem (season 2); Michael Tavera (season 3)
- Country of origin: United States
- Original language: English
- No. of seasons: 3
- No. of episodes: 30

Production
- Executive producers: Mike Young; Steve Rosen; Alex Zamm (season 1); Jeff Kline (season 1)
- Producer: Donna Smith
- Running time: 5–6 minutes
- Production companies: Universal Pictures International; Universal 1440 Entertainment; Universal Animation Studios; Splash Entertainment

Original release
- Network: YouTube
- Release: December 3, 2018 – December 12, 2022

Related
- The New Woody Woodpecker Show (1999–2002)

Woody Woodpecker is an American animated web series featuring the cartoon character of the same name created by Walter Lantz and produced by Splash Entertainment. The series premiered on YouTube on December 3, 2018.

In 2020, Woody Woodpecker and Wally Walrus appeared in a series of PSAs. The second season premiered on October 28 the same year. The third season premiered on November 6, 2022. The tenth episode of the third season, titled "Space Track", was not published on the official Woody Woodpecker channel on YouTube until April 2, 2023. It was available on the official Facebook page and removed at beginning of January the same year.

In 2023, the series became available to watch on Kabillion.

== Voice cast ==
- Eric Bauza – Woody Woodpecker, Ghost, Bird, Yeti
- Tara Strong – Winnie Woodpecker, Splinter, Wendy Walrus, Veronica Buzzard
- Tom Kenny – Wally Walrus, Glorbnorb III, Todd, Big Bulk Mart Announcer, Easter Bunny, Wally's Mother, Cameraman, Basil Beaver, Wally's Boss
- Kevin Michael Richardson – Buzz Buzzard
- Nika Futterman – Knothead
- Brad Norman – Chilly Willy (Season 1)
- Dee Bradley Baker – Chilly Willy (Season 2–3), Bees, Chickasaurus, Blob
- Scott Weil – Andy Panda, Director
- Jeff Bennett – Ari Cari
- Fred Stoller – Peacock
- Bernardo de Paula – Luiz, Sports Announcer
- Roger Craig Smith – Fella Furetti
- Candi Milo – Mother Nature, Mrs. Woodpecker
- Corey Burton – Narrator

== Episodes ==
=== Series overview ===
Season	Episodes	Originally released	
Season	Episodes	First released	Last released
1	10	December 3, 2018	
2	10	October 28, 2020	November 25, 2020
3	10	November 6, 2022	December 12, 2022

=== Season 1 (2018) ===
No.	Title	Written by	Original release date
1	"Invasion of the Birdy Snatchers"	William Robertson and Alex Zamm	December 3, 2018
A pair of bumbling aliens named Glorbnorb III and Todd arrive on Earth in order to abduct an Earthling specimen, but run into Woody.
2	"I'm with Cupid, Stupid"	William Robertson and Alex Zamm	December 3, 2018
Woody does everything he can to avoid being struck by Cupid Andy's love arrows on Valentine's Day so that he won't marry Winnie.
3	"The Pen Is Flightier Than the Sword"	William Robertson and Alex Zamm	December 3, 2018
When Buzz Buzzard gets hold of the animator's stylus, he vengefully turns Woody's life upside down in a surreal way.
4	"Baby It's Cold Inside"	Zac Atkinson	December 3, 2018
During a snowstorm outside Woody's home, Woody's romantic date with Winnie gets interrupted by third wheel Chilly Willy.
5	"No Time Like a Present"	Marty Isenberg	December 3, 2018
Woody and Wally battle over a new game console when there is just one left in the store.
6	"Christmess Eve"	William Robertson and Alex Zamm	December 3, 2018
Wally is determined to harvest the biggest Christmas tree in the forest, which is Woody's home.
7	"The Yolk's on You"	Shaene Siders	December 3, 2018
Woody and his friends compete in the annual Easter egg hunt to which they will stop at nothing to win the grand prize.
8	"Scout's Dishonor"	Eric Acosta	December 3, 2018
Woody tries to help Splinter and Knothead earn their scout badges, with disastrous results.
9	"Quest for the Jade Jaguar"	William Robertson and Alex Zamm	December 3, 2018
While vacationing in Rio de Janeiro, Woody finds a treasure map that results in him, alongside a monkey named Luiz, going on the hunt while Buzz becomes bent on getting to the treasure first.
10	"Blame It on Rio de Janeiro"	Marty Isenberg	December 3, 2018
Woody, Winnie and Luiz end up at a Brazilian championship soccer match where the former inadvertently becomes a national hero.

=== Season 2 (2020) ===
No. overall	No. in season	Title	Written by	Original release date
11	1	"Time Warped"	David Skelly	October 28, 2020
Woody travels on a time machine to fix a mistake that caused his enmity with Wally to end forever.
12	2	"Haunted Hijinks"	Matt Craig	October 28, 2020
Woody enters a haunted house in an attempt to convince Knothead and Splinter that there is no ghost inside.
13	3	"Nature Nuts"	Ken Pontac	November 4, 2020
Woody gets into the work of two documentary filmmakers talking about nature.
14	4	"Birds of a Feather"	Ken Pontac	November 4, 2020
To participate in a carnival parade, Woody needs to steal a peacock's feathers to create a mask.
15	5	"Woody's Wake Up"	Ken Pontac	November 11, 2020
Woody cannot get a well-deserved night to sleep when his nephew and niece Knothead and Splinter decide to visit his home.
16	6	"The Bird and the Bees"	Matt Craig	November 11, 2020
After enraging a large swarm of bees, Woody tries to get rid of them with the help of Wally and Chilly Willy.
17	7	"Chilly Grilly"	Matt Craig	November 18, 2020
When Chilly invades Woody's barbecue and eats all the hamburgers, Woody believes that Wally is to blame.
18	8	"War of the Woods"	David Skelly	November 18, 2020
Woody and Buzz compete against each other to get the huge reward from the Wood Carving Contest.
19	9	"Winnie's Wish"	Ken Pontac	November 25, 2020
Woody thinks Winnie is having a birthday. With that, he tries to present her with several surprise gifts.
20	10	"Fall Guy"	Ken Pontac	November 25, 2020
Woody goes out of his way to drop the Brazilian Falls in a barrel, while Wally, working as a guard, tries to stop him.

=== Season 3 (2022) ===
No. overall	No. in season	Title	Written by	Original release date
21	1	"The Crimson Crest"	Kevin Fleming & Rob Janas	November 6, 2022
Woody and Wally have a wrestling championship in order to get the winner's belt.
22	2	"Meat and Greet"	Kevin Fleming & Rob Janas	November 6, 2022
Woody crashes a master-chef program starring a vegetarian wolf.
23	3	"Finger in the Pie"	Ken Pontac	November 6, 2022
After getting out of jail, Buzz steals Woody's pie recipe.
24	4	"Gold Tusk"	Jim Martin	November 6, 2022
In a James Bond reference, Woody is a spy who infiltrates an impossible mission.
25	5	"Fair Weathered Fools"	Harold McLaughlin & Mike Milo	November 6, 2022
Woody and Wally help in restoring order to Mother Nature... for the worse.
26	6	"The Mother of All Problems"	Matt Craig and Ken Pontac	November 6, 2022
Woody tries to stop Winnie from meeting his mother during a visit on Mother's Day.
27	7	"From Tusk til Dawn"	Kevin Fleming & Rob Janas	November 6, 2022
Wally, as a vampire hunter, needs to save his tusks from little count Chilly Willy. Note: This is the only episode in which Woody does not appear.
28	8	"Jurassic Woody"	Ken Pontac	November 6, 2022
Woody, like a caveman, saves a small dinosaur in a prehistoric adventure.
29	9	"Class Dismissed"	Kevin Fleming & Rob Janas	November 6, 2022
Woody, Knothead and Splinter create a slimy monster after using a science kit.
30	10	"Space Track"	Harold McLaughlin & Mike Milo	December 12, 2022
In a parody of Star Trek, Woody and his friends have an adventure in space. Note: This is the only episode in the series that was not included in the official Woody Woodpecker YouTube channel, only being released on the Woody Woodpecker official Facebook before being removed at the beginning of January 2023. It was eventually released on YouTube on April 2, 2023.

== Production ==
In 2018, Universal 1440 Entertainment was producing a new series of Woody Woodpecker animated shorts exclusively for the official Woody Woodpecker YouTube channels in Brazilian Portuguese, Spanish and English. The first season was directed by Alex Zamm, who also directed the 2017 film. The second and third seasons were directed by Mike Milo.
