= Woody Woodpecker (2017 film) =

2017 film by Alex Zamm

- U.S. home video release poster
- Directed by: Alex Zamm
- Screenplay by: William Robertson; Alex Zamm
- Story by: William Robertson; Alex Zamm; Daniel Altiere; Steven Altiere
- Based on: Woody Woodpecker by Universal Pictures & Walter Lantz
- Produced by: Mike Elliott
- Starring: Timothy Omundson; Thaila Ayala; Graham Verchere; Jordana Largy; Scott McNeil; Adrian Glynn McMorran; Eric Bauza
- Cinematography: Barry Donlevy
- Edited by: Heath Ryan
- Music by: Chris Hajian
- Production companies: Universal Animation Studios; Universal 1440 Entertainment
- Distributed by: Universal Pictures
- Release dates: October 5, 2017 (Brazil); February 6, 2018 (United States)
- Running time: 91 minutes
- Country: United States
- Language: English
- Budget: $10 million
- Box office: $15.3 million

Woody Woodpecker (also known as Woody Woodpecker: The Movie) is a 2017 American live-action animated slapstick comedy film directed by Alex Zamm, loosely based on the cartoon character of the same name and produced by Universal 1440 Entertainment in co-production with Universal Animation Studios and distributed by Universal Pictures. The film stars Timothy Omundson, Graham Verchere, Jordana Largy and Thaila Ayala, and features Eric Bauza as the voice of Woody Woodpecker. The film's plot follows Woody protecting his forest from a real estate lawyer planning to build an investment house in his habitat.

While Woody Woodpecker was filmed in English, it was only released theatrically in the Latin American market, which the film catered to and where the character is most popular. Elsewhere, it was released primarily as a direct-to-video feature. The film received generally negative reviews from critics and grossed $15.3 million against a $10 million budget. A sequel, Woody Woodpecker Goes to Camp, was released on Netflix on April 12, 2024.

== Plot ==
In the Pine Grove forest in Washington, Woody Woodpecker detects brothers Nate and Otis Grimes, two taxidermist poachers who attempt to capture and sell him for money, and causes them to tranquilize each other. In Seattle, Lance Walters, a real estate lawyer, gets fired, after a video of him claiming that wildlife conservation is unprofitable goes viral. He tells his glamorous girlfriend, Vanessa, that he intends to build an investment home on a large piece of property located near the Canadian border, left to him by his grandfather. Lance's ex-wife Linda leaves their son Tommy with him and Vanessa, since she needs to care for her hospitalized father in Philadelphia.

At the Pine Grove forest, Lance, Tommy, and Vanessa meet park ranger Samantha Bartlett. As Lance and Vanessa unpack, Tommy goes into the forest for a walk. There, he discovers and befriends Woody, after he gives him peanut butter cookies. Woody visits the family at lunchtime, and eats almost all of the food. Lance tries to shoo Woody away, but he accidentally wrecks the table and hits Vanessa in the face with a broom. The next morning, construction on the investment home begins, prompting an angered Woody to constantly cause chaos at the site. Later, in a nearby town, Tommy befriends a young musician named Jill, who persuades him to join her band in the annual Firefly Festival. Tommy is then saved from two bullies by Woody.

As days pass, Lance grows more frustrated, because of Woody's constant annoyance, mischief, chaos, and destruction of his project, and he goes to confront Samantha at the ranger station. She reveals that Woody is an endangered species known as the pileated red-crowned woodpecker, which was thought to be extinct for 100 years and Native Americans saw as a god of mischief and chaos. Lance continues with his work, but Vanessa leaves him after Woody blows up their RV with her inside. Lance tries to get Nate and Otis, who secretly still plan to sell Woody, to get rid of him, but he keeps outwitting them. Samantha advises Lance to make peace with Woody. Lance attempts to surrender to Woody by giving him cookies. Woody agrees to let him and the workers continue with their construction, as long as he is given food every day. Eventually, the investment home is completed, despite excessive payment and extended scheduling.

At the town's Firefly Festival, Tommy and Jill's drummer Lyle comes down with food poisoning, prompting Woody to take over using a homemade drum kit. The performance is a success, and Lance is delighted to hear that Woody gave Tommy support. Concluding that having humans around again isn't a bad thing, Woody heads back to the investment home and carves a mural above the fireplace. As he signs his name into the carving, however, he accidentally hits exposed wiring, which causes a house fire. Horrified by his mistake, he flies back to his tree. Angered, Lance calls Nate and Otis, who cut down his tree and tase him unconscious. As they leave, Tommy castigates his father for his actions and runs away. He then forms a plan to rescue Woody and heads to the Grimes' brothers old barn with Jill and Lyle, as the brothers try to sell Woody at an online black market auction. While sifting through the house's wreckage, Lance finds the charred mural that Woody had created. Realizing that the fire was an accident, he enlists Samantha's help and they set out to find both Tommy and Woody, but the entire gang is captured by the brothers. As Nate aims a tranquilizer on Woody, Lance tilts his cage towards Woody's and frees him. After attacking the brothers, Woody chases them as they attempt to flee to the Canada border. He carves a hole in the middle of the bridge, and the brothers fall into the river below, where they later are stopped by the police, and having been fed up with Woody's antics, willfully turn themselves in with Woody saying that it is their turn to live in a cage.

Later, Lance apologizes to Woody for not knowing that the house fire was an accident and therefore replaces Woody's cut-down tree with a birdhouse. Woody accepts both the gift and the gang as his surrogate family.

== Cast ==
=== Live-action cast ===
- Graham Verchere as Tommy Walters, the teenage son of Lance. He is Woody's best friend.
- Timothy Omundson as Lance Walters, a Seattle lawyer who is the ex-husband of Linda, Tommy's father and Vanessa's boyfriend. His name is a reference to Woody's creator Walter Lantz.
- Jordana Largy as Samantha Barlett, the park-ranger of Pine Grove.
- Thaila Ayala as Vanessa, Lance's selfish, arrogant, narcissistic, and cold-hearted girlfriend who ends up being tormented by Woody's antics, causing her to break up with Lance after Woody blows up her RV. Ayala was cast to add appeal in Brazil, and in the Brazilian dubbing, Ayala voiced herself.
- Adrian Glynn McMorran as Otis Grimes, a slow-witted poacher and partner/younger brother of Nate.
- Scott McNeil as Nate Grimes, a cruel poacher who wants to capture and sell Woody in auction.
- Chelsea Miller as Jill Ferguson, a teenager bass guitarist who becomes Tommy's friend.
- Jakob Davies as Lyle, a drummer who is Tommy and Jill's friend.
- Sean Tyson as George, a builder who directs the building of the new house of Lance.
- Emily Holmes as Linda Walters, Lance's ex-wife and mother of Tommy.
- Patrick Lubczyk as Chris, a bully who is the partner of John and harasses Tommy but is humiliated by Woody.
- Ty Consiglio as John, a bully who also harasses Tommy in one part of the film but is humiliated by Woody.
- Karin Konoval as Barbara Krum, the receptionist for Lance.

=== Voice cast ===
- Eric Bauza as Woody Woodpecker, a rare, manic and cheeky pileated woodpecker.

== Production ==
In November 2011, Universal Pictures and Illumination Entertainment planned an animated Woody Woodpecker feature film. John Altschuler and Dave Krinsky (King of the Hill) were in talks to develop a story, but in July 2013, Illumination canceled the project.

In October 2013, Bill Kopp was hired by Universal and Illumination to direct an animated feature film with three interwoven stories. The project was put on hold and then cancelled, as Chris Meledandri confirmed that its concept was too thin for an 85-minute film.

In 2016, Universal 1440 Entertainment was filming a live-action/CGI hybrid Woody Woodpecker film, following the success of Alvin and the Chipmunks. Director and co-writer Alex Zamm was in discussions with Universal executives to direct a Woody Woodpecker film, with co-writer William Robertson following their previous project The Little Rascals Save the Day. He has also watched all 200 Woody Woodpecker cartoons, as preparation for the film. For cost-effective reasons, it was agreed upon for the film to have a more singular approach with Woody Woodpecker being the one surreal element as a photorealistic character in the real world. Filming began that June and ended later in July. Filming was done in Squamish, British Columbia, Canada. The primary audience in mind for the film was that of Brazil. The cartoon has been broadcast in the country for, by 2017, 38 years, and the Brazilian newspaper Folha Vitória stated that the series was popular ("com ótima audiência").

== Release ==
The film was first released theatrically in Brazil (under the name of Pica-Pau: O Filme) on October 5, 2017.

In the week of the premiere of the film, a person/people dressed in a costume of the character came to Brazil and visited several cities such as the capital Brasília, Manaus, Olinda, Curitiba, Rio de Janeiro and São Paulo. The highlight visit was when some scenes from the episode "Niagara Fools" were reproduced in the Iguaçu Falls.

=== Home media ===
Woody Woodpecker was released in the United States and Canada on DVD, Digital HD, and Netflix on February 6, 2018, and on Blu-ray on September 4 the same year. The film was launched on direct-to-video format in the United States and around the world on that day. In the United Kingdom, it was distributed through British home video distributor Dazzler Media, under license from Universal.

== Reception ==
=== Box office ===
As of March 2018, Woody Woodpecker has grossed $15.3 million. It debuted at $1.5 million, finishing second at the Brazilian box office behind Blade Runner 2049. The film increased by +45.4% in its second weekend, moving to first place with $2.1 million.

=== Critical response ===
Reviews for the film were generally negative. On review aggregator website Rotten Tomatoes, the film has a 13% approval rating based on 8 reviews. Common Sense Media rated the film one out of five stars: "Inanely cruel villains, an unoriginal story, ham-handed performances, and reliance on farts and burps are the low lights of this awkward effort to bring back a less-than-engaging cartoon bird". Jodi Smith of entertainment website Pajiba gave the film a negative review: "If I was a super villain and I wanted to harm all of the children of the world, I would fund and release a movie like Woody Woodpecker". Conversely, Fernando Alvarez of the Argentine newspaper Clarín referred to the film as "... effective entertainment for a young audience..." in a positive review.

== Future ==
=== Sequel and possible third installment ===
A sequel, titled Woody Woodpecker Goes to Camp, was released on Netflix on April 12, 2024. The film was in development since September 2021. Filmed in Victoria, Australia, the film was directed by Jon Rosenbaum and produced by Jon Kuyper.

In an interview with Rosenbaum, he expressed hope for a third film in the franchise that would introduce Winnie Woodpecker.
