= Woody Woodpecker Goes to Camp =

2024 film by Jon Rosenbaum

- Release poster
- Directed by: Jon Rosenbaum
- Screenplay by: Cory Edwards; Jim Martin; Stephen Mazur
- Story by: Stephen Mazur; Cory Edwards
- Based on: Woody Woodpecker by Universal Pictures & Walter Lantz
- Produced by: Jon Kuyper
- Starring: Eric Bauza (voice); Kevin Michael Richardson (voice); Tom Kenny (voice); Mary-Louise Parker; Chloe de los Santos; Josh Lawson
- Cinematography: Ross Emery
- Edited by: Jonathan Tappin
- Music by: Michael Lira
- Production companies: Universal Pictures; Universal Animation Studios; Universal 1440 Entertainment
- Distributed by: Netflix
- Release date: April 12, 2024
- Running time: 99 minutes
- Country: United States
- Language: English

Woody Woodpecker Goes to Camp is a 2024 American live-action animated slapstick comedy film directed by Jon Rosenbaum (in his feature directorial debut) and produced by Jon Kuyper, from a screenplay written by Jim Martin, Cory Edwards, and Stephen Mazur, and a story conceived by Mazur and Edwards. The film is based on the cartoon character of the same name and serving as a standalone sequel to the 2017 film Woody Woodpecker and the second installment of the Woody Woodpecker live-action film series. The film was produced by Universal 1440 Entertainment and with Universal Animation Studios and distributed by Netflix, where it was released on April 12, 2024. Like its predecessor, the film received negative reviews from critics.

== Plot ==
After getting kicked out of the forest for tormenting an influencer camper whom he finds too annoying until he can learn teamwork, Woody decides that he can learn about teamwork in the nearby Camp Woo Hoo, but after arriving, an escaped convict named Buzz Buzzard arrives shortly and then poses as the chef of rival camp Camp Hoo Rah, to rob a hidden treasure.

After Woody arrives, he befriends Angie the camp director, and her daughter, Maggie, and causes chaos at the camp, but after Buzz's failed attempts to destroy the camp, and after Woody gets to know the campers, and helps the campers train for an annual camp game event known as the Wilderness Games, he gets framed for causing chaos again after meeting and fighting Buzz. Inspector Wally Walrus arrives and threatens to shut down the camp. Woody convinces the inspector to give the camp one more chance by letting them participate in the Wilderness Games, but Camp Woo Hoo has a history of losing endlessly to Camp Hoo Rah, since they are creative artists and the Hoo Rahs are tough soldiers, thus leaving the campers with low self-esteem. After taking a few losses, however, the Woo Hoos begin to turn their talents into their most effective weapons. As the Games proceed, Buzz observes with dismay and tries to sabotage Woo Hoo's chances of winning, while also communicating on phone calls with his accomplice for finding the treasure.

Before the final challenge, Woody finally discovers Buzz's evil plot to blackmail Zane, the Camp Hoo Rah director and Maggie's uncle, into selling him the two camps, and gets locked in the freezer, but later gets inadvertently freed by the mailman, who delivers all of Buzz's arsenal shopping. As Woody is about to leave, Buzz catches sight of Woody, and they start to fight again. The campers of Camp Woo Hoo discover that their fort was destroyed, but despite having no fortifications, Maggie manages to hatch a plan that eliminates almost all of the Hoo Rahs, leaving only one to defend the flag. Woody is overpowered, but manages to fire a flare gun and rallies both camps back to the main grounds, where Woody exposes Buzz's illegal arsenal purchasing and plans to steal the treasure. Buzz traps Woody and the campers in the kitchen, but they manage to escape. The camps then try to save the chest that Buzz has stolen, but Maggie's belt gets caught and Woody sacrifices his attempt to defeat Buzz and saves Maggie from falling before rendering himself unconscious.

Afterwards, the camps reconcile when they discover that their statue of Obadiah had been the treasure all along, and Woody is filled with emotion when he discovers that he has a long-forgotten ancestor on the land. The two camps then unite into one camp, with the name Camp Woo Hoo Rah, and even put Woody on their camp flag. Before Woody flies back to the forest with his newfound redemption, he hugs Maggie goodbye, saying that he will be back the following summer.

In a mid-credits scene, after accidentally crash-landing their helicopter upon realizing that the chest had nothing but rocks, Buzz and his accomplice Darren find themselves outside a police station, where several police have shown up to re-arrest them, much to their dismay.

== Cast ==
=== Voice cast ===
- Eric Bauza as Woody Woodpecker, a goofy and crazy woodpecker whose antics get him kicked out of his home and sent to learn about teamwork.
- Kevin Michael Richardson as Buzz Buzzard, a black vulture and escaped convict who tries to shut down Camp Woo Hoo in attempt to rob hidden gold and later blackmail rival Camp Hoo Rah director, Zane.
- Tom Kenny as Wally Walrus, a walrus inspector who threatens to shut down Camp Woo Hoo after all its violations and history of being destroyed to Hoo Rah.

=== Live-action cast ===
- Mary-Louise Parker as Angie, the mother of Maggie and the director of Camp Woo Hoo.
- Chloe De Los Santos as Maggie
- Josh Lawson as Zane, a cousin of Angie and director of Woo Hoo's rival camp Hoo Rah, who gets bribed by Buzz into being his cook.
- Savannah La Rain as J.J.
- Esther Son as Rose
- Evan Stanhope as Gus
- George Holahan-Cantwell as Orson
- Kershawn Theodore as Mikey
- CC Dewar as Devin
- Ras-Samuel Weld A'abzgi as Kyler
- Max DePina as Police Officer
- Anthony Craig as Darren, Buzz's escaped cellmate and accomplice

== Production and release ==
In 2021, Universal Pictures and Universal 1440 Entertainment announced a sequel to the 2017 Woody Woodpecker film. It was shot in Melbourne and across regional areas of Victoria from September to December of that year.

The film was released on Netflix on April 12, 2024.

== Reception ==
On the review aggregator website Rotten Tomatoes, 20% of 5 critics' reviews are positive, with an average rating of 4.2/10.

== Possible sequel ==
In an interview with Jon Rosenbaum, he expressed hope for a third film in the franchise that would introduce Winnie Woodpecker.
