= Wally Walrus =

Fictional cartoon walrus (1940s–present)

- Promotional artwork for The New Woody Woodpecker Show
- First appearance: The Beach Nut (1944)
- Created by: Walter Lantz; James Culhane
- Voiced by: Jack Mather (1944–1949); Lee Sweetland (1944); Will Wright (1946); Hans Conried (1946); Walker Edmiston (1947); Herb Lytton (1947); Harry E. Lang (1948–1953); Mel Blanc (1948–1955); Nestor Paiva (1953); Dallas McKennon (1953); Paul Frees (1961); Daws Butler (1962–1964); Billy West (1999–2002; 2017); Tom Kenny (2018–present)
- Years active: 1944–present

In-universe information
- Species: Walrus
- Gender: Male
- Significant other: Wendy Walrus
- Relatives: Willy Walrus (nephew)
- Nationality: Swedish

Wally Walrus is an animated cartoon character created by Walter Lantz and James Culhane. He appeared in several films produced by Walter Lantz Productions from the 1940s through the 1960s.

Wally first appeared in The Beach Nut (1944), and was the first major recurring foil to Woody Woodpecker since his inception, before he was more-or-less replaced by Buzz Buzzard in the late 1940s. Nevertheless, Wally has appeared frequently in Woody-related media since then.

== History ==
Wally is an anthropomorphic walrus. In most of his appearances, he speaks with a pronounced Swedish accent, and is rather slow-witted and prone to anger when provoked. He often hums My Bonnie Lies over the Ocean to himself. He is depicted most frequently as one of Woody Woodpecker's main foils, sharing the same dynamic with him as with Buzz Buzzard.

Wally was voiced in his original appearance and subsequent others by Jack Mather, who voiced The Cisco Kid on radio. Lantz stock player William Wright gave him a growly, non-Swedish voice in The Reckless Driver (1946), where Hans Conried also voiced him for one line, in a reference to Red Skelton's radio character Junior from The Raleigh Cigarette Program, "Ooooohh, I hurt my wittle hand!", though uncredited. Wally also appeared with Andy Panda in Dog Tax Dodgers (1948), and with Chilly Willy in Clash and Carry (1961) and Tricky Trout (1961); in the latter two shorts he was voiced by Paul Frees.

The character's appearance changed somewhat over the years, with a complexion that ranged from dark to light flesh-tone and variously sized tusks, which Wally would be drawn with or without. A frequent animation error in The New Woody Woodpecker Show was to draw Wally's mouth separate from his tusks so it appeared they were protruding from his nostrils.

An unidentified background character resembling Wally made a brief cameo during the final scene of the 1988 film Who Framed Roger Rabbit, and is featured in various print media and merchandise.

Wally is a regular character in The New Woody Woodpecker Show, voiced by Billy West.

A character parodying Wally Walrus appears as a cameo in the fifth season of Samurai Jack on Adult Swim, and is once again voiced by Billy West using a similar voice to his other character Zoidberg on Futurama.

Wally Walrus appears in the 2018 Woody Woodpecker series, voiced by Tom Kenny. In the series, Wally has a girlfriend named Wendy Walrus.

Wally Walrus appears in the 2024 film Woody Woodpecker Goes to Camp, voiced again by Tom Kenny.

== Appearances ==
1. The Beach Nut (1944)
2. Ski for Two (1944)
3. Chew-Chew Baby (1945)
4. The Dippy Diplomat (1945)
5. Bathing Buddies (1946)
6. The Reckless Driver (1946)
7. Smoked Hams (1947)
8. The Overture to William Tell (1947)
9. Well Oiled (1947)
10. The Mad Hatter (1948)
11. Banquet Busters (1948)
12. Kiddie Koncert (1948)
13. Wacky-Bye Baby (1948)
14. Dog Tax Dodgers (1948)
15. Sleep Happy (1951)
16. Slingshot 6 7/8 (1951)
17. The Woody Woodpecker Polka (1951)
18. Stage Hoax (1952)
19. What's Sweepin' (1953)
20. Buccaneer Woodpecker (1953)
21. Operation Sawdust (1953)
22. Clash and Carry (1961)
23. Tricky Trout (1961)
24. Spook-a-Nanny (1964)
