= The Barber of Seville (1944 film) =

1944 film by Shamus Culhane

- Directed by: James Culhane
- Story by: Ben Hardaway; Milt Schaffer
- Produced by: Walter Lantz
- Starring: Ben Hardaway; Lee Sweetland; Dick Nelson
- Music by: Darrell Calker; Gioachino Rossini
- Animation by: Laverne Harding; Les Kline; Emery Hawkins; Pat Matthews; Paul J. Smith; Rudy Zamora
- Layouts by: Art Heinemann
- Backgrounds by: Phil DeGuard
- Color process: Technicolor
- Production company: Walter Lantz Productions
- Distributed by: Universal Pictures
- Release date: April 22, 1944
- Running time: 6:55
- Languages: English; Italian

The Barber of Seville is the tenth animated cartoon short subject in the Woody Woodpecker series. Released theatrically on April 22, 1944, the film was produced by Walter Lantz Productions and distributed by Universal Pictures.

== Plot ==
Woody arrives at "Tony Figaro's" barber shop in hopes of getting a "victory haircut" (a then-contemporary World War II reference). Finding the shop's proprietor out for an Army physical, Woody attempts to cut his own hair and those of other customers. The first customer that comes in is a Native American who asks for a quick shampoo, and Woody then makes a mess shampooing the man's head, which then causes the man's headdress to shrink into a badminton birdie. The angry Native American then threatens to scalp Woody for "giving him the bird", but Woody quickly knocks the customer out cold with a mallet and sends him out the door, where he ends up standing perfectly still on a pedestal in front of a tobacco shop, holding cigars. Shortly afterwards, Woody's second and primary customer is a burly Italian construction worker who asks for "the whole works".

Once Woody blow-torches the man's construction helmet off his head, he proceeds to lather his client's face, chin, mouth, and shoes while singing Rossini's "Largo al factotum". Woody then produces a sharp razor and begins shaving the man. He elevates the barber's chair to the ceiling while singing an aria, allowing the man to fall to the ground and destroy the chair. Woody then begins liberally swinging the razor at his frightened client, who runs to escape him. A chase throughout the barbershop ensues as Woody doubles the tempo of his singing, until the woodpecker corners the man in the barber's chair and proceeds to give him a shave and haircut at manic speed.

The construction worker is dusted off and sent out the door on his way, but the angry client returns to give the woodpecker his karma. The man picks Woody up and slings him through a glass window and back inside the shop, where the woodpecker lands and is bopped by shaving mugs falling from a broken shelf. As a last touch, the barber's pole falls on Woody, whose head is seen caught inside the pole.

== Cast ==
- Ben Hardaway as Woody Woodpecker
- Lee Sweetland as Woody Woodpecker (singing Largo Al Factotum)
- Dick Nelson as Indian Man, Italian Worker

== Production notes ==
The Barber of Seville was the first cartoon to feature a new character design for Woody Woodpecker, by art director Art Heinemann.

In tandem with the use of the new Woody design, The Barber of Seville was the first Woody Woodpecker cartoon to use the standardized opening title card, animated by Hawkins, featuring Woody popping out of a log, asking Guess Who?!, and delivering his trademark laugh. The audio for this opening sequence is lifted from Woody's first starring appearance in the 1941 cartoon Woody Woodpecker, in which Woody was voiced by Mel Blanc.

Ben Hardaway, also the co-storyman on Barber of Seville, provided Woody's voice for the first time, succeeding Dick Nelson and Kent Rogers (the former only voiced Woody in the previous short Ration Bored, while the latter was killed in a World War II plane crash three months after The Barber of Seville's release), and Lee Sweetland performed as Woody's singing voice. Hardaway would become Woody's sole speaking voice for the remainder of the 1940s.

The Barber of Seville was the first Woody cartoon directed by veteran animator James "Shamus" Culhane, who had been working on Lantz's Swing Symphonies for a year prior, and would continue to direct entries in the series until 1946.

A parody of Gioachino Rossini's 1816 opera of the same name, The Barber of Seville is noted for its uses of speed, timing, and music synchronization. During the shaving of the second client, several shots are presented in rapid succession, some lasting only one-fourth of a second. Woody's demeanor and attitude are designed to match the music, and during the famous Figaro portion of the tune, Woody splits into three, then four, then five instances of himself, in less than two seconds of screen time. Culhane later called The Barber of Seville one of the best achievements of his directing career.

By 1944, Rossini's opera was a staple of American cartoon humor, with a noted earlier use in the Looney Tunes short Notes to You (1941) starring Porky Pig. Later cartoons to parody Rossini's music include Rabbit of Seville (1950) starring Bugs Bunny and the MGM cartoons Kitty Foiled starring Tom and Jerry and Magical Maestro starring Butch Dog. In 1994, The Barber of Seville was voted #43 of The 50 Greatest Cartoons of all time, as voted by 1000 animation professionals and edited by Jerry Beck. It is the only Woody Woodpecker entry included in the list.

== See also ==
- List of American films of 1944
