= The Beach Nut =

- Title card
- Directed by: James Culhane
- Story by: Ben Hardaway; Milt Schaffer
- Produced by: Walter Lantz
- Starring: Jack Mather; Ben Hardaway; Lee Sweetland
- Music by: Darrell Calker
- Animation by: Les Kline; Dick Lundy; Emery Hawkins; Don Williams; Laverne Harding; Paul Smith
- Layouts by: Art Heinemann
- Backgrounds by: Philip DeGuard
- Color process: Technicolor
- Production company: Walter Lantz Productions
- Distributed by: Universal Pictures
- Release date: October 16, 1944
- Running time: 6:50
- Language: English

The Beach Nut is the 11th animated cartoon short subject in the Woody Woodpecker series. Released theatrically on October 16, 1944, the film was produced by Walter Lantz Productions and distributed by Universal Pictures. The title is a play on "beech nut".

== Plot ==
The cartoon begins in medias res with vacationer Wally Walrus beating Woody Woodpecker into submission on a beachfront amusement pier. Wally explains to the gathered crowd what happened earlier to provoke his anger.

In a flashback, the walrus decides to go to the beach to relax for his day off, but a surfing Woody continually upsets him by walking over him, stealing his picnic, and building a fire next to the "NO FIRES ALLOWED ON BEACH" sign. Woody accidentally sets Wally's umbrella and beach chair alight, which is the final straw for Wally. The pair battle using the firefighting equipment, and Woody escapes by tunneling under the sand, inside a pole, and coming out of a pelican's beak.

Wally chases Woody to the amusement pier, where the woodpecker pretends to be a palm reader. Wally demands to know where Woody is, and the disguised Woody hits Wally on the head with a mallet. Wally tries to grab at Woody behind some curtains, but crashes offscreen. Woody laughs, only to be grabbed by an infuriated Wally.

Returning to the present, Wally ties Woody to an anchor and hurls him into the ocean. The rope snags on the pier, demolishing first the pier and then the entire marina. The cartoon ends with Woody swimming away toward the horizon, pursued by Wally, and both of them pursued by the other beachgoers.

== Production notes ==
The Beach Nut marked the debut of Woody Woodpecker's recurring antagonist, Wally Walrus. Voiced by actor Jack Mather, Wally became Woody's primary rival until 1948, before being replaced with Buzz Buzzard in Wet Blanket Policy. Woody would lose more battles to Wally than any of his other opponents.
