= Hot and Cold Penguin =

- Directed by: Alex Lovy
- Written by: Alex Lovy
- Produced by: Walter Lantz
- Starring: Daws Butler
- Music by: Clarence Wheeler
- Animation by: Laverne Harding; Ray Abrams; Don Patterson
- Layouts by: Raymond Jacobs
- Color process: Technicolor
- Production company: Walter Lantz Productions
- Distributed by: Universal Pictures
- Release date: October 24, 1955
- Running time: 6 minutes
- Language: English

Hot and Cold Penguin is a 1955 Chilly Willy cartoon directed by Alex Lovy and produced by Walter Lantz.

It was the third Chilly Willy entry in the series and was the first cartoon Alex Lovy directed at the Walter Lantz Studio since his departure in 1943. Although Tex Avery had departed the year prior, he left behind several storyboards ultimately utilized by Lovy for Hot and Cold Penguin, Room and Wrath and Hold That Rock. Lovy remained director of the series for the remainder of the decade.

== Plot ==
Chilly Willy is outside in the snow keeping himself warm with a campfire. A blizzard suddenly blows in and freezes the fire solid. Another blizzard blows in, sending Chilly Willy flying to a "Little America" sign. He looks up and sees a log cabin with a furnace inside and races toward it.

Smedley forces the penguin out with a bayonet pointing at his back. Chilly is then standing in front of a field of signs, with Smedley holding up a "Beware of Dog" sign. He then makes a face to scare the penguin and retreats back to his cabin to rest.

Chilly Willy drills a hole underneath Smedley's head and pushes him off to the side. He shushes him and goes in front of the furnace to get warm. He suddenly realizes what he did and Smedley forces him out by kicking him further away from the cabin.

Smedley goes back to rest. Chilly Willy swipes the rug and Smedley falls down a hole. Outside, Smedley unscrews a cork and plays "Taps" on his trumpet while Chilly Willy sinks into the water. Smedley returns to his cabin to take another rest, but he immediately wakes up after seeing Chilly Willy on the furnace. Back outside, Smedley unscrews another cork, but as he plays "Taps", the ice sinks along with him.

Back inside the cabin, Smedley wrings out his tail and before going back to his nap, he checks the furnace for Chilly Willy. After confirmation, he returns to sleep. Chilly Willy pulls on the chimney, pulling the furnace along with it. Smedley forces the furnace down, but Chilly Willy forces it back up. Smedley climbs to the rooftop and gets an idea. He takes several packs of dynamite and loads them in the furnace. Chilly Willy pulls the furnace up. Nothing happens, and Smedley goes to see Chilly Willy warming himself up. He opens the top of the furnace and gets an explosion to his face.

Back inside the cabin, Smedley hammers the furnace down to the floor as a precautionary measure, but Chilly Willy sees the furnace from beneath and pulls it down. Smedley peeks down the hole and is hit with another explosion. Angry, Smedley yanks the chimney up from the hole.

He ties Chilly Willy to a firework launcher and sends the penguin into orbit. Smedley heads back inside the cabin but heads back out to see Chilly Willy relaxing with a group of aliens around the furnace. Smedley ties himself to a firework launcher, plays "Taps" in a sad pitch, and is launched into orbit. Chilly Willy watches him from the cabin. He then performs the same dance Smedley does and rests on the furnace.

== See also ==
- Chilly Willy - first entry from 1953
- The Legend of Rockabye Point - Oscar-nominated 1955 CW short
- I'm Cold - 1954 short film featuring the debut of Smedley Dog
