= The Woody Woodpecker Show =

American television series

- Title card
- Genre: Comedy
- Created by: Walter Lantz
- Directed by: Paul Smith; Alex Lovy; Sid Marcus
- Voices of: Grace Stafford
- Composers: Walter Greene; Darrell Calker; Clarence Wheeler
- Country of origin: United States
- No. of seasons: 5
- No. of episodes: 113

Production
- Producer: Walter Lantz
- Editors: F.Y. Smith; Norman Suffern
- Running time: 30 minutes
- Production companies: Walter Lantz Productions (seasons 1–4); Universal City Studios (season 5; 1988)

Original release
- Network: ABC (season 1); Syndication (season 2); NBC (seasons 3–5)
- Release: October 3, 1957 – January 29, 1977

Related
- The New Woody Woodpecker Show

The Woody Woodpecker Show is an American television series mainly composed of the animated cartoon shorts of Woody Woodpecker and other Walter Lantz characters including Andy Panda, Chilly Willy, The Beary Family and Inspector Willoughby, all released by Walter Lantz Productions. The series was revived and reformatted several times, but remained popular for nearly four decades and allowed the studio to continue making theatrical cartoons until 1972, when it shut down. It also kept the Walter Lantz/Universal "cartunes" made during the Golden age of American animation as a part of the American consciousness. The Woody Woodpecker Show was named the 88th best animated series by IGN.

== History ==
Movie theater owners in the 1950s were finding that they could release feature films with reissued cartoons, or no cartoons at all, and the audiences would still come. Because of the practice, the theatrical cartoon business was suffering and losing money. By 1956 there were only seven animation producers in the short-subjects field, and by the end of the decade that number would dwindle down to three. Walter Lantz and his distributor, Universal Pictures, knew that the only way to subsidize the rising production costs of new shorts was to release their product to television. Norman Gluck from Universal's short-subjects department made a deal with the Leo Burnett Agency to release some older Lantz product on television. Burnett handled the Kellogg's cereal account and Lantz soon met with the Kellogg's people to sign the contract. Lantz admitted that he was only working in the medium because he was "forced into TV" and "cartoons for theaters would soon be extinct".

The Woody Woodpecker Show debuted on ABC on the afternoon of October 3, 1957. The series was shown once a week, on Thursday afternoons, replacing the first half-hour of the shortened Mickey Mouse Club. Lantz integrated his existing cartoons with new live-action footage, giving the show an updated look that satisfied both viewers and Lantz himself. The live-action and animation segments created for the show, called "A Moment with Walter Lantz", featured an informative look at how the animation process for his "cartunes" worked, as well as how the writers came up with stories and characters. The live-action segments were directed by Jack Hannah, who was fresh from the Walt Disney Animation Studios where he had done similar live-action/animation sequences for the Disney show.

After the initial year on ABC, The Woody Woodpecker Show was syndicated until 1966. The "A Moment with Walter Lantz" segments were eventually replaced with "Woody's Newsreel" and "Around the World with Woody" which used footage of Universal Newsreels and featured voice-over commentary by Walter Lantz and Woody Woodpecker.

In 1970, the show reappeared on network television, with 26 additional episodes assembled by Lantz for NBC. The show ran on NBC until September 2, 1972, which is the same year the Walter Lantz Productions studio shut down. The show was revived again on September 11, 1976, featuring cartoons made from 1935 to 1972. The show ended its network run on September 3, 1977. Local stations continued to air The Woody Woodpecker Show for the next several years.

In 1984, Lantz sold everything outright to MCA/Universal, though he remained active in overseeing how Universal handled his characters (for merchandise, TV, home video, theme parks, limited edition cels, etc.) up until his death in 1994.

In 1987, MCA/Universal and The Program Exchange returned the show to television with a new 90-episode package for syndication. This Woody Woodpecker Show featured a complete overhaul of the series format. Gone were the newsreels, "Around the World" segments, and live-action scenes with Walter Lantz, replaced by vignettes known as "Musical Miniatures", in which new musical compositions were played over montages of classic cartoon footage. New commercial bumpers were added and a new opening sequence was created. This one featured Woody, Andy Panda, Chilly Willy, Smedley the Dog, and Inspector Willoughby along with Woody's nemeses Buzz Buzzard, Gabby Gator, and Wally Walrus as they caused chaos in a small town. Episodes of this Woody Woodpecker Show typically consisted of two Woody cartoons bookending another Lantz cartoon (typically a Chilly Willy cartoon). The series continued airing in syndication until 1998. Around that time, Cartoon Network picked up rerun rights and aired The Woody Woodpecker Show for several months, after which the series disappeared from television for 25 years.

After Cartoon Network dropped The Woody Woodpecker Show, Universal revived most of the Lantz characters in The New Woody Woodpecker Show with Billy West voicing Woody, which ran from 1999 to 2002 as part of the Fox Kids and YTV Saturday morning lineup.

In 2023, MeTV acquired the broadcast rights to Walter Lantz cartoons from 1934 to 1972 to air The Woody Woodpecker Show on Saturday mornings on September 2 as part of MeTV's Saturday Morning Cartoons animation block, marking Woody's return to television after 21 years, and was also picked up by MeTV Toons one year later. They were not aired in the actual The Woody Woodpecker Show anthology episode formats, but the separate theatrical cartoon prints are shown directly from the Universal vaults.

== Episodes ==
Cartoons with an '*' are repeats.

=== Season 1 (1957–58) ===
This season consist of 30s and 40s Walter Lantz cartoons.

#	1st cartoon	2nd cartoon	3rd cartoon	Original air date
1	Who's Cookin' Who? (1946)	The Overture to William Tell (1947)	Bathing Buddies (1946)	October 3, 1957
2	Ace in the Hole (1942)	The Bandmaster (1947)	Banquet Busters (1948)	October 10, 1957
3	Life Begins for Andy Panda (1939)	Pied Piper of Basin Street (1945)	Knock Knock (1940)	October 17, 1957
4	Chew Chew Baby (1945)	The Sleeping Princess (1939)	The Dizzy Acrobat (1943)	October 24, 1957
5	Fish Fry (1944)	Pixie Picnic (1948)	Woody Dines Out (1945)	October 31, 1957
6	The Hollywood Matador (1942)	Adventures of Tom Thumb Jr. (1940)	Well Oiled (1947)	November 7, 1957
7	Andy Panda Goes Fishing (1940)	The Poet and the Peasant (1946)	Ski for Two (1944)	November 14, 1957
8	Fair Weather Fiends (1946)	Scrambled Eggs (1939)	Woody The Giant Killer (1947)	November 21, 1957
9	Mousie Come Home (1946)	Apple Andy (1946)	The Dippy Diplomat (1945)	November 28, 1957
10	Pantry Panic (1941)	Kiddie Koncert (1948)	Wacky Bye Baby (1948)	December 5, 1957
11	The Painter and the Pointer (1944)	Dog Tax Dodgers (1948)	The Mad Hatter (1948)	December 12, 1957
12	The Screwball (1943)	Three Lazy Mice (1935)	Solid Ivory (1947)	December 19, 1957
13	Crow Crazy (1944)	Sliphorn King Of Polaroo (1945)	The Reckless Driver (1946)	December 26, 1957
14	The Wacky Weed (1946)	Musical Moments from Chopin (1947)	The Beach Nut (1944)	January 2, 1958
15	Meatless Tuesday (1943)	Jungle Jive (1944)	The Loose Nut (1945)	January 9, 1958
16	Smoked Hams (1947)	Fox and the Rabbit (1935)	The Barber of Seville (1944)	January 16, 1958
17	100 Pygmies and Andy Panda (1940)	Kitten Mittens (1940)	The Coo Coo Bird (1947)	January 23, 1958
18	The Dizzy Acrobat (1943)*	Toyland Premiere (1935)	Woody Dines Out (1945)*	January 30, 1958
19	Life Begins for Andy Panda (1939)*	Fish Fry (1944)*	The Hollywood Matador (1942)*	February 6, 1958
20	Well Oiled (1947)*	Pixie Picnic (1948)*	Ski for Two (1944)*	February 13, 1958
21	Andy Panda Goes Fishing (1940)*	Adventures of Tom Thumb Jr. (1940)*	Fair Weather Fiends (1946)*	February 20, 1958
22	Woody the Giant Killer (1947)*	The Poet and the Peasant (1946)*	The Dippy Diplomat (1945)*	February 27, 1958
23	Mousie Come Home (1946)*	Scrambled Eggs (1939)*	Pantry Panic (1941)*	March 6, 1958
24	Wacky Bye Baby (1948)*	Apple Andy (1946)*	The Mad Hatter (1948)*	March 13, 1958
25	The Painter and the Pointer (1944)*	Kiddie Koncert (1948)*	The Screwball (1943)*	March 20, 1958
26	Solid Ivory (1947)*	Dog Tax Dodgers (1948)*	The Reckless Driver (1946)*	March 27, 1958

=== Season 2 (1963–64) ===
This season consist of 50s and some 40s Walter Lantz cartoons.

#	1st cartoon	2nd cartoon	3rd cartoon	Original air date
27	I'm Cold (1954)	A Horse's Tale (1954)	Puny Express (1951)	September 4, 1963
28	Slingshot 6 7/8 (1951)	Syncopated Sioux (1940)	Wet Blanket Policy (1948)	September 11, 1963
29	Wild and Woody (1948)	Crazy House (1940)	Dig That Dog (1954)	October 16, 1963
30	What's Sweepin' (1953)	The Mouse and the Lion (1953)	The Legend of Rockabye Point (1955)	September 18, 1963
31	Woodpecker In The Rough (1952)	The Egg Cracker Suite (1943)	Sh-h-h-h-h-h (1955)	September 25, 1963
32	Sleep Happy (1951)	Good-bye Mr. Moth (1942)	Flea For Two (1955)	October 2, 1963
33	Hot Noon (1953)	The Flying Turtle (1953)	Room and Wrath (1956)	October 9, 1963
34	Wrestling Wrecks (1953)	Pig in a Pickle (1954)	Drooler's Delight (1949)	October 23, 1963
35	The Great Who-Dood-It (1952)	Andy Panda's Pop (1941) (Note: Reissued as "Goofy Roofer" for television release.)	Paw's Night Out (1955)	October 30, 1963
36	Real Gone Woody (1954)	Boogie Woogie Sioux (1942) (Note: Reissued as "Indian Beatnick" for television release.)	Chilly Willy (1953) (Note: Reissued as "Deep Freeze" for television release.)	November 6, 1963
37	Get Lost (1956)	The Dog That Cried Wolf (1953)	Hot Rod Huckster (1954)	November 13, 1963
38	Wicket Wacky (1951)	Andy Panda's Victory Garden (1942) (Note: Reissued as "Springtime for Andy" for television release.)	The Ostrich Egg and I (1956)	November 20, 1963
39	The Secret Weapon (1960) (Note: This is the only Space Mouse cartoon.)	Convict Concerto (1954)	I'm Cold (1954)*	November 27, 1963
40	The Redwood Sap (1951)	Crazy Mixed Up Pup (1955)	The Screwdriver (1941) (Note: Reissued as "Woody's Jalopy" for television release.)	December 4, 1963
41	Nutty Pine Cabin (1942)	Scalp Treatment (1952)	The Talking Dog (1956)	December 11, 1963
42	Termites From Mars (1952)	Swing Your Partner (1943)	Hold That Rock (1956)	December 18, 1963
43	Ration Bored (1943) (Note: Reissued as "The Gas Bandit" for television release.)	Scrappy Birthday (1949)	Plywood Panic (1953)	December 25, 1963
44	Hypnotic Hick (1953)	Dizzy Kitty (1941)	Maw & Paw (1953)	January 1, 1964
45	Buccaneer Woodpecker (1953)	The Hams That Couldn't Be Cured (1942)	Hot and Cold Penguin (1955)	January 8, 1964
46	Belle Boys (1953)	Broadway Bow Wow's (1954)	Woody Woodpecker (1941)	January 15, 1964
47	Helter Shelter (1955)	Hot Noon (1953)*	Juke Box Jamboree (1942)	January 22, 1964
48	Jungle Medics (1960) (Note: This is the only Sam & Simian cartoon.)	Real Gone Woody (1954)*	The Legend of Rockabye Point (1955)*	January 29, 1964
49	Alley to Bali (1954)	Destination Meatball (1951) / Under The Spreading Blacksmith Shop (1941) (Note: Reissued as "The Village Blacksmith" for television release.)	Pigeon Holed (1956)	February 5, 1964
50	The Loan Stranger (1942)	Playful Pelican (1948)	Under The Counter Spy (1954)	February 12, 1964
51	Operation Sawdust (1953)	Man's Best Friend (1941)	Hay Rube (1954)	February 19, 1964
52	Convict Concerto (1954)*	Mouse Trappers (1941)	Born to Peck (1952)	February 26, 1964

==== Special episode (1964) ====
#	1st cartoon	2nd cartoon	3rd cartoon	Original air date
-	Playful Pelican (1948)*	Under The Counter Spy (1954)*	Spook-A-Nanny (1964)	October 21, 1964

=== Season 3 (1970–71) ===
From Season 3 onward, the episodes include four cartoons instead of three.

#	1st cartoon	2nd cartoon	3rd cartoon	4th cartoon	Original air date
53	Pistol Packin' Woodpecker (1960)	St. Maritz Blitz (1961)	Fodder and Son (1957)	Freeloading Feline (1960)	September 5, 1970
54	Chief Charlie Horse (1956)	Space Mouse (1959)	After The Ball (1956)	The Big Snooze (1957)	September 12, 1970
55	Box Car Bandit (1957)	The Goofy Gardener (1957)	Woody Meets Davy Crewcut (1956)	Hyde and Sneak (1962)	September 19, 1970
56	Arts and Flowers (1956)	Salmon Yeggs (1958)	Gabby's Diner (1961)	Doc's Last Stand (1961)	September 26, 1970
57	The Woody Woodpecker Polka (1951)	Truant Student (1959)	The Tree Medic (1955)	Witty Kitty (1960)	October 3, 1970
58	Woodpecker In The Moon (1959)	Little Televillain (1958)	Calling All Cuckoos (1956)	The Bongo Punch (1957)	October 10, 1970
59	Misguided Missile (1958)	Bear and the Bees (1961)	Watch The Birdie (1958)	Punchy Pooch (1962)	October 17, 1970
60	Half Empty Saddles (1958)	Fowled Up Party (1957)	Round Trip To Mars (1957)	A Chilly Reception (1958)	October 24, 1970
61	Ballyhooey (1960)	Rough and Tumbleweed (1961)	Franken-Stymied (1961)	Mother's Little Helper (1962)	October 31, 1970
62	The Unbearable Salesman (1957)	Yukon Have It (1959)	Dopey Dick The Pink Whale (1957)	Phoney Express (1962)	November 7, 1970
63	Private Eye Pooch (1955)	Hunger Strife (1960)	Ozark Lark (1960)	Polar Pests (1958)	November 14, 1970
64	Panhandle Scandal (1959)	Eggnapper (1961)	Fowled Up Falcon (1960)	Operation Cold Feet (1957)	November 21, 1970
65	Woodpecker From Mars (1956)	Tricky Trout (1961)	Everglade Raid (1958)	Three Ring Fling (1958)	November 28, 1970
66	International Woodpecker (1957)	Swiss Miss-Fit (1957)	Niagara Fools (1956)	Mississippi Slow Boat (1961)	December 5, 1970
67	Socko in Morocco (1954)	Salmon Loafer (1963)	To Catch a Woodpecker (1957)	Papoose on the Loose (1961)	December 12, 1970
68	Southern Fried Hospitality (1960)	Mackerel Moocher (1962)	Bats in The Belfry (1960)	Case of the Cold Storage Yegg (1963)	December 19, 1970
69	Stage Hoax (1952)	Bee Bopped (1959)	His Better Elf (1958)	Robinson Gruesome (1959)	December 26, 1970
70	Kiddie League (1959)	Charlie's Mother-in-Law (1963)	The Bird Who Came to Dinner (1961)	Fish and Chips (1963)	January 2, 1971
71	Poop Deck Pirate (1961)	Pesky Pelican (1963)	A Fine Feathered Frenzy (1954)	Corny Concerto (1962)	January 9, 1971
72	Log Jammed (1959)	Hi-Seas Hi-Jacker (1963)	The Tee Bird (1959)	Sufferin' Cats (1961)	January 16, 1971
73	Billion Dollar Boner (1960)	Coming Out Party (1963)	Romp in a Swamp (1959)	Pest of Show (1962)	January 23, 1971
74	Red Riding Hoodlum (1957)	Fowled-Up Birthday (1962)	Tree's a Crowd (1958)	Fish Hooked (1960)	January 30, 1971
75	Tomcat Combat (1959)	Goose is Wild (1963)	Heap Big Hepcat (1960)	Tin Can Concert (1961)	February 6, 1971
76	Jittery Jester (1958)	Clash and Carry (1961)	How to Stuff a Woodpecker (1960)	Mouse Trapped (1959)	February 13, 1971
77	Square Shootin' Square (1955)	Plumber of Seville (1957)	Witch Crafty (1955)	Goose in the Rough (1963)	February 20, 1971
78	Bunco Busters (1955)	Case of the Red-Eyed Ruby (1961)	Bedtime Bedlam (1955)	Pigeon Patrol (1942)	February 27, 1971

=== Season 4 (1971–72) ===
#	1st cartoon	2nd cartoon	3rd cartoon	4th cartoon	Original air date
79	Careless Caretaker (1962)	Half Baked Alaska (1965)	Guest Who? (1965)	Busman's Holiday (1961)	September 4, 1971
80	Tragic Magic (1962)	Chilly Chums (1967)	Foot Brawl (1966)	Room and Bored (1962)	September 11, 1971
81	Crowin' Pains (1962)	Fractured Friendship (1965)	Davey Cricket (1965)	Woody's Kook-Out (1961)	September 18, 1971
82	Greedy Gabby Gator (1963)	Deep Freeze Squeeze (1964)	The Case of the Elephant's Trunk (1965)	Shutter Bug (1963)	September 25, 1971
83	Science Friction (1963)	Hot Time on Ice (1967)	Mouse in the House (1967)	Home Sweet Homewrecker (1962)	October 2, 1971
84	Rocket Racket (1962)	Pesty Guest (1965)	Rooftop Razzle Dazzle (1964)	Short in the Saddle (1963)	October 9, 1971
85	Voo-Doo Boo-Boo (1962)	Chilly and the Woodchopper (1967)	Rah-Rah Ruckus (1964)	Skinfolks (1964)	October 16, 1971
86	Stowaway Woody (1963)	Coy Decoy (1963)	Ski-Napper (1964)	Little Woody Riding Hood (1962)	October 23, 1971
87	Freeway Fracas (1964)	Polar Fright (1966)	Window Pains (1967)	Calling Dr. Woodpecker (1963)	October 30, 1971
88	Dumb Like a Fox (1964)	Lighthouse Keeping Blues (1964)	The Case of the Maltese Chicken (1964)	The Tenant's Racket (1963)	November 6, 1971
89	Saddle-Sore Woody (1964)	Vicious Viking (1967)	Snow Place Like Home (1966)	Get Lost! Little Doggy (1964)	November 13, 1971
90	Woody's Clip Joint (1964)	Operation Shanghai (1967)	Tepee for Two (1963)	South Pole Pals (1966)	November 20, 1971
91	Robin Hoody Woody (1963)	Phantom of the Horse Opera (1961)	Teeny Weeny Meany (1966)	Rock-A-Bye Gator (1962)	November 27, 1971

=== Season 5 (1976–77) ===
#	1st cartoon	2nd cartoon	3rd cartoon	4th cartoon	Original air date
92	Astronut Woody (1966)	A Haunting We Will Go (1939)	Airlift a la Carte (1971)	All Hams on Deck (1970)	September 4, 1976
93	The Big Bite (1966)	Tumble Weed Greed (1969)	Bugged in a Rug (1968)	Buster's Last Stand (1970)	September 11, 1976
94	Bye Bye Blackboard (1972)	Moochin Pooch (1971)	Chiller Dillers (1968)	Canned Dog Feud (1965)	September 18, 1976
95	Show Biz Beagle (1972)	Sissy Sheriff (1967)	Let Charlie Do It (1972)	Sioux Me (1965)	September 25, 1976
96	Fat in the Saddle (1968)	What's Peckin' (1965)	Chilly and the Looney Gooney (1969)	Feudin Fightin-N-Fussin (1968)	October 2, 1976
97	Flim Flam Fountain (1970)	Under Sea Dogs (1968)	A Fish Story (1972)	For the Love of Pizza (1972)	October 9, 1976
98	The Genie with the Light Touch (1972)	Wild Bill Hiccup (1970)	Chilly's Cold War (1970)	Gold Diggin' Woodpecker (1972)	October 16, 1976
99	Hassle in a Castle (1966)	Woodpecker Wanted (1965)	Charlie the Rainmaker (1971)	Have Gun, Can't Travel (1967)	October 23, 1976
100	Hi-Rise Wise Guys (1970)	Paste Makes Waste (1968)	Chilly's Hide-a-Way (1971)	Horse Play (1967)	October 30, 1976
101	Hook Line and Stinker (1969)	Woody and the Beanstalk (1966)	Charlie's Campout (1969)	Hot Hot Diggity Dog (1967)	November 6, 1976
102	Janie Get Your Gun (1965)	Rain, Rain, Go Away (1972)	Chilly's Ice Folly (1970)	Indian Corn (1971)	November 13, 1976
103	Kitty from the City (1971)	Sleepy Time Bear (1969)	Charlie's Golf Classic (1970)	A Lad in Bagdad (1968)	November 20, 1976
104	Little Skeeter (1969)	How to Trap a Woodpecker (1971)	A Gooney is Born (1971)	Lonesome Ranger (1966)	November 27, 1976
105	Lotsa Luck (1968)	Woody the Freeloader (1968)	Cool It Charlie (1969)	Monster of Ceremonies (1966)	December 4, 1976
106	The Nautical Nut (1967)	The Bungling Builder (1971)	Gooney's Goofy Landings (1970)	One Horse Town (1968)	December 11, 1976
107	Peck of Trouble (1968)	Woody's Knight-Mare (1969)	Charlie in Hot Water (1970)	Pecking Holes in Poles (1972)	December 18, 1976
108	Phoney Pony (1969)	Unlucky Potluck (1972)	Highway Hecklers (1968)	Practical Yolk (1966)	December 25, 1976
109	Prehistoric Super Salesman (1969)	Woody's Magic Touch (1971)	Gopher Broke (1969)	The Reluctant Recruit (1971)	January 1, 1977
110	Roamin' Roman (1964)	Sleepy Time Chimes (1971)	Project Reject (1969)	Rough Riding Hood (1966)	January 8, 1977
111	Seal on the Loose (1970)	The Snoozin' Bruin (1971)	Jerky Turkey (1968)	Secret Agent Woody Woodpecker (1967)	January 15, 1977
112	Shanghai Woody (1971)	The Unhandy Man (1970)	The Rude Intruder (1972)	Ship A'hoy Woody (1969)	January 22, 1977
113	Chilli Con Corny (1972)	Candyland (1935)	Jolly Little Elves (1935)	Coo Coo Nuts (1970)	January 29, 1977

== Broadcast history ==
Title	Network	Run	Notes
The Woody Woodpecker Show	ABC	October 3, 1957 – September 25, 1958	original animation with bridge animation*
The Woody Woodpecker Show	Syndication	1958–1966	reruns of ABC series, sponsored by Kellogg's new episodes produced in 1963–64*
The Woody Woodpecker Show	NBC	September 12, 1970 – September 2, 1972; September 11, 1976 – September 3, 1977	new episodes without bridge animation
Woody Woodpecker and Friends	Syndication	1977–1987	Package of 185 individual shorts; 170 more added in 1982
The Woody Woodpecker Show	Syndication	January 1988 – 1997	91-episode rerun package with new opening, bridges and music Also broadcast on TNT from 1991 to 1992 and Cartoon Network from 1997 to 1998
The Woody Woodpecker Show	MeTV	2023–present	Package of individual shorts
The Woody Woodpecker Show	MeTV Toons	2024–present	Package of individual shorts

(*) = total of 59 episodes with original animation

== Home media ==
In the early 2000s, a series of mail-order Woody Woodpecker Show VHS tapes and DVDs were made available through Columbia House. Each volume featured "cartunes", bumpers, and 'A Moment with Walter Lantz' or "Newsreel" segments set in the 1957-1977 format of The Woody Woodpecker Show, though Volumes 11-15 hardly feature any "Moments" or "Newsreels". There were complaints about cuts made to the shorts, which ranged from shorts from restored and intact prints to severely cut TV edits.

In 2007, Universal Pictures Home Entertainment released The Woody Woodpecker and Friends Classic Cartoon Collection, six behind-the-scenes segments from The Woody Woodpecker Show and a 1964 episode that contained the cartoon "Spook-a-Nanny" were released on the collection as bonus features. The following year, The Woody Woodpecker and Friends Classic Cartoon Collection: Volume 2 was released, featuring twelve behind-the-scenes segments and two pilot cartoons, "The Secret Weapon" and "Jungle Medics" from The Woody Woodpecker Show.
