= Chilly Willy filmography =

Chilly Willy
- Created by: Paul J. Smith (original); Tex Avery (redesign)
- Original work: Chilly Willy (1953)
- Owner: Walter Lantz Productions
- Years: 1953–2022

Films and television
- Film: Who Framed Roger Rabbit (1988) (mentioned): Woody Woodpecker Goes to Camp (2024) (as statue)
- Short films: Chilly Willy (1953); I'm Cold (1954); Hot and Cold Penguin (1955)
- Web series: Woody Woodpecker (2018–2022)
- Animated series: The Woody Woodpecker Show (1957–1997); The New Woody Woodpecker Show (1999–2002)
- Television special: Appearances (from 1956 to 1997)
- Direct-to-video: Classic Cartoons; Classic Cartoons Volume 2

Official website
- www.chillywillyfan.com

This is a list of Walter Lantz "Cartunes" featuring Chilly Willy. All are entries in Lantz's Chilly Willy series.

Directors for each short are noted. The first five cartoons (Chilly Willy through Room and Wrath) were released in The Woody Woodpecker and Friends Classic Cartoon Collection. Five additional shorts, including Hold That Rock and Half-Baked Alaska, were released in The Woody Woodpecker and Friends Classic Cartoon Collection: Volume 2.

== 1950s ==
=== 1953 ===
| # | Title | Date | Director | Notes |
|---|---|---|---|---|
| 1 | Chilly Willy | December 21 | Paul Smith | First appearance of Chilly.; First Chilly short directed by Paul Smith.; Renamed "Deep Freeze" in the airing of The Woody Woodpecker Show. |

=== 1954 ===
| # | Title | Date | Director | Notes |
|---|---|---|---|---|
| 2 | I'm Cold | December 20 | Tex Avery | First appearance of Smedley Dog.; First Chilly short directed by Tex Avery.; Castle Films title: "Some Like It Not". |

=== 1955 ===
| # | Title | Date | Director | Notes |
|---|---|---|---|---|
| 3 | The Legend of Rockabye Point | April 11 | Tex Avery | Chilly Willy's last short directed by Tex Avery. Nominated for an Academy Award for Best Animated Short Film. |
| 4 | Hot and Cold Penguin | October 24 | Alex Lovy | Chilly Willy's first short directed by Alex Lovy. |

=== 1956 ===
| # | Title | Date | Director | Notes |
|---|---|---|---|---|
| 5 | Room and Wrath | June 4 | Alex Lovy | |
| 6 | Hold That Rock | July 30 | Alex Lovy | |

=== 1957 ===
| # | Title | Date | Director | Notes |
|---|---|---|---|---|
| 7 | Operation Cold Feet | May 6 | Alex Lovy | |
| 8 | The Big Snooze | August 30 | Alex Lovy | |
| 9 | Swiss Miss-Fit | December 2 | Alex Lovy | |

=== 1958 ===
| # | Title | Date | Director | Notes |
|---|---|---|---|---|
| 10 | Polar Pests | May 19 | Alex Lovy | |
| 11 | A Chilly Reception | June 16 | Alex Lovy | |
| 12 | Little Televillain | December 8 | Alex Lovy | |

=== 1959 ===
| # | Title | Date | Director | Notes |
|---|---|---|---|---|
| 13 | Robinson Gruesome | February 2 | Alex Lovy | |
| 14 | Yukon Have It | March 30 | Alex Lovy | Chilly Willy's last short directed by Alex Lovy. |

== 1960s ==
=== 1960 ===
| # | Title | Date | Director | Notes |
|---|---|---|---|---|
| 15 | Fish Hooked | August 10 | Paul Smith | |

=== 1961 ===
| # | Title | Date | Director | Notes |
|---|---|---|---|---|
| 16 | Clash and Carry | April 25 | Jack Hannah | First appearance of Wally Walrus in a Chilly Willy's short.; First Chilly short directed by Jack Hannah. |
| 17 | St. Moritz Blitz | May 16 | Paul Smith | |
| 18 | Tricky Trout | September 5 | Jack Hannah | Final appearance of Wally Walrus in a Chilly Willy's short. |

=== 1962 ===
| # | Title | Date | Director | Notes |
|---|---|---|---|---|
| 19 | Mackerel Moocher | April 10 | Jack Hannah | |

=== 1963 ===
| # | Title | Date | Director | Notes |
|---|---|---|---|---|
| 20 | Fish and Chips | January 8 | Jack Hannah | Chilly Willy's last short directed by Jack Hannah. First cartoon with recreated 1957 theme. |
| 21 | Salmon Loafer | May 28 | Sid Marcus | First Chilly short directed by Sid Marcus. |
| 22 | Pesky Pelican | September 24 | Sid Marcus | Final Chilly short under the Universal International banner. |

=== 1964 ===
| # | Title | Date | Director | Notes |
|---|---|---|---|---|
| 23 | Deep Freeze Squeeze | March 3 | Sid Marcus | First Chilly short under the Universal Pictures banner. |
| 24 | Lighthouse Keeping Blues | August 1 | Sid Marcus | |
| 25 | Ski-Napper | November 1 | Sid Marcus | |

=== 1965 ===
| # | Title | Date | Director | Notes |
|---|---|---|---|---|
| 26 | Fractured Friendship | March 1 | Sid Marcus | Woody Woodpecker makes a short cameo appearance. |
| 27 | Half-Baked Alaska | April 1 | Sid Marcus | Last cartoon with recreated 1957 theme. |
| 28 | Pesty Guest | June 1 | Sid Marcus | First cartoon with new 1965 theme. |

=== 1966 ===
| # | Title | Date | Director | Notes |
|---|---|---|---|---|
| 29 | Snow Place Like Home | February 1 | Paul Smith | |
| 30 | Polar Fright | April 1 | Paul Smith | First appearance of Maxie the Polar Bear. |
| 31 | South Pole Pals | May 1 | Paul Smith | |
| 32 | Teeny Weeny Meany | July 1 | Sid Marcus | |

=== 1967 ===
| # | Title | Date | Director | Notes |
|---|---|---|---|---|
| 33 | Operation Shanghai | January 1 | Sid Marcus | Final Chilly short directed by Sid Marcus. |
| 34 | Vicious Viking | February 1 | Paul Smith | |
| 35 | Hot Time on Ice | March 1 | Paul Smith | |
| 36 | Chilly And The Woodchopper | May 1 | Paul Smith | |
| 37 | Chilly Chums | June 1 | Paul Smith | Woody Woodpecker makes another cameo appearance, as well as his last appearance in a Chilly Willy short. |

=== 1968 ===
| # | Title | Date | Director | Notes |
|---|---|---|---|---|
| 38 | Under Sea Dogs | March 1 | Paul Smith | |
| 39 | Highway Hecklers | September 1 | Paul Smith | First appearance of Colonel Pot Shot. |
| 40 | Chiller Dillers | December 1 | Paul Smith | |

=== 1969 ===
| # | Title | Date | Director | Notes |
|---|---|---|---|---|
| 41 | Project Reject | April 1 | Paul Smith | |
| 42 | Chilly and the Looney Gooney | July 1 | Paul Smith | First appearance of Looney Gooney. |
| 43 | Sleepy Time Bear | December 1 | Paul Smith | |

== 1970s ==
=== 1970 ===
| # | Title | Date | Director | Notes |
|---|---|---|---|---|
| 44 | Gooney's Goofy Landings | March 2 | Paul Smith | |
| 45 | Chilly's Ice Folly | June 8 | Paul Smith | |
| 46 | Chilly's Cold War | November 2 | Paul Smith | |

=== 1971 ===
| # | Title | Date | Director | Notes |
|---|---|---|---|---|
| 47 | A Gooney Is Born | January 1 | Paul Smith | |
| 48 | Airlift A La Carte | May 1 | Paul Smith | Only short that actually has Chilly, Maxie, Looney Gooney, and Smedley all appearing in one cartoon despite the opening. |
| 49 | Chilly's Hide-A-Way | September 1 | Paul Smith | Final appearances of Smedley and Colonel Pot Shot. |

=== 1972 ===
| # | Title | Date | Director | Notes |
|---|---|---|---|---|
| 50 | The Rude Intruder | January 1 | Paul Smith | Final appearances of Chilly Willy, Maxie the Polar Bear, and Looney Gooney.; Final Chilly short directed by Paul Smith.; Final cartoon with a Sid Marcus credit (story).; Last cartoon with new 1970 theme.; Final cartoon by Walter Lantz Productions outside the Woody Woodpecker and The Beary Family shorts. |
