= Daws Butler =

American voice actor (1916–1988)

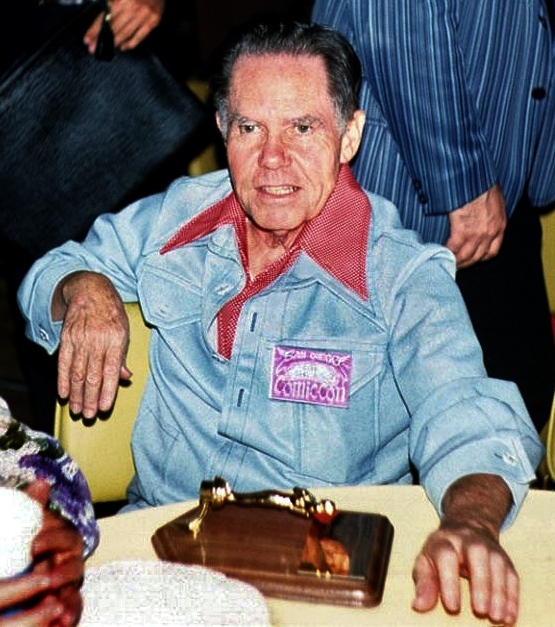
- Butler in 1976
- Born: Charles Dawson Butler; November 16, 1916; Toledo, Ohio, U.S.
- Died: May 18, 1988 (aged 71); Los Angeles, California, U.S.
- Resting place: Holy Cross Cemetery, Culver City
- Other name: Dawes Butler
- Occupation: Voice actor
- Years active: 1935–1988
- Spouse: Myrtis Martin (m. 1943)
- Children: 4
- Awards: Inkpot Award (1975)

Charles Dawson Butler (November 16, 1916 – May 18, 1988) was an American voice actor. He worked mostly for the Hanna-Barbera cartoon production company and the Walter Lantz cartoon studio. He originated the voices of many Hanna-Barbera characters, including Yogi Bear, Huckleberry Hound, Spike the Bulldog, Snagglepuss, Quick Draw McGraw and Baba Looey, Augie Doggie, Loopy De Loop, Wally Gator, Snooper and Blabber, Dixie and Mr. Jinks, Hokey Wolf, Lippy the Lion, Elroy Jetson, Lambsy, Peter Potamus, The Funky Phantom, and Hair Bear. While at Walter Lantz, he did the voices of: Chilly Willy, Smedley, Maxie the Polar Bear, Gooney, and Sam in the Maggie and Sam series.

== Early life and career ==
Butler was born on November 16, 1916, in Toledo, Ohio, the only child of Charles Allen Butler (1890–1972) and Ruth Butler (1899–1960). The family later moved from Ohio to Oak Park, Illinois, where Butler became interested in impersonating people.

In 1935, Butler began performing as an impressionist, entering multiple amateur contests and winning most of them—not with the intention of showing his talent, but as a personal challenge to overcome his shyness. He subsequently won professional engagements at vaudeville theaters.

He then teamed up with fellow performers Jack Lavin and Willard Ovitz, forming the comedy trio The Three Short Waves. They played in theaters, on radio, and in nightclubs, with positive reviews from regional critics and audiences. They dissolved the act in 1941 when Butler joined the United States Navy as America entered World War II. He subsequently met his wife-to-be Myrtis at a wartime function near Washington, D.C.

His first voice work for an animated character was in the animated short Short Snorts on Sports (1948), produced by Screen Gems. At the Metro-Goldwyn-Mayer cartoon department, Tex Avery hired Butler to provide the voice of a British wolf on Little Rural Riding Hood (1949) and also to narrate several of his cartoons.

Throughout the late 1940s and mid-1950s, Butler had roles in many Avery-directed cartoons: the Fox in Out-Foxed, the narrator/cat in The Cuckoo Clock, the Cobbler in The Peachy Cobbler, Mr. Theeves and Spike (one line) in Droopy's Double Trouble, Mysto the Magician in Magical Maestro, John the Cab and John the B-29 Bomber in One Cab's Family and Little Johnny Jet, and Charlie in The Legend of Rockabye Point.

Beginning with The Three Little Pups, Butler provided the voice for a nameless wolf that spoke in a Southern accent and whistled all the time (the tune was Henry C. Work's "Kingdom Coming"). The character also appeared in Sheep Wrecked, Billy Boy, and many other cartoons. At MGM, Avery wanted Butler to take on the voice of Droopy, at a time when Bill Thompson was unavailable due to radio engagements. Butler did a few lines, then recommended Don Messick, another actor and Butler's lifelong friend, who was better at imitating Thompson. Messick voiced Droopy in several shorts.

In 1949, Butler landed a role in a televised puppet show created by former Warner Bros. Cartoons animation director Bob Clampett called Time for Beany. He was teamed with Stan Freberg, with whom he did all the puppets' voices: Butler voiced Beany Boy and Captain Huffenpuff, and Freberg voiced Cecil and Dishonest John. An entire stable of recurring characters were also seen. The show's writers were Charles Shows and Lloyd Turner, whose dependably funny dialog was still always at the mercy of Butler's and Freberg's ad libs. Time for Beany ran from 1949 to 1954, and won several Emmy Awards.

In 1952, Butler starred in the live-action short Nice Try, Virgil.

He briefly turned his attention to writing and voicing television commercials. In the 1950s, Freberg asked him to help him write comedy skits for his Capitol Records albums. Their first collaboration, "St. George and the Dragonet" (based on Dragnet), was the first comedy record to sell over a million copies. Freberg was more of a satirist who did song parodies, but the bulk of his dialogue routines were co-written by and co-starred Butler.

Butler teamed again with Freberg and actress June Foray in a CBS radio series, The Stan Freberg Show, which ran from July to October 1957 as a summer replacement for Jack Benny's program. Freberg's box set, Tip of the Freberg (Rhino Entertainment, 1999), chronicles every aspect of Freberg's career except the cartoon voice-over work, and showcases his career with Butler. In Mr. Magoo, the UPA theatrical animated short series for Columbia Pictures, Butler played Magoo's nephew Waldo (also voiced by Jerry Hausner at various times). In Freberg's "Green Chri$tma$" in 1958, a scathing indictment of the over-commercialization of the holiday, Butler soberly hoped instead that we'd remember "whose birthday we're celebrating".

Butler provided the voices of many nameless Walter Lantz Productions' characters for theatrical shorts later seen on the Woody Woodpecker program. His characters included the penguin Chilly Willy and his best friend Smedley, a Southern-accented dog (the same voice used for Tex Avery's laid-back wolf character and for Hanna-Barbera's Huckleberry Hound).

In 1957, when MGM had closed their animation unit, producers William Hanna and Joseph Barbera quickly formed their own company, and Butler and Don Messick were on hand to provide voices. The first, The Ruff and Reddy Show, with Butler voicing Reddy, set the formula for the rest of the series of cartoons that the two helmed until the mid-1960s. He played the title roles in The Huckleberry Hound Show, The Quick Draw McGraw Show, and The Yogi Bear Show, and portrayed a variety of other characters.

== Characters ==
Some of the characters voiced by Butler from 1948 to 1988 included:

- Aesop's Son (in the "Aesop and Son" segment of The Rocky and Bullwinkle Show)
- Alfy Gator (of Yakky Doodle)
- Albert (Albert in Blunderland/To Be an Ant)
- Ali Gator (in two Lantz theatrical shorts)
- Augie Doggie
- Baba Looey (from Quick Draw McGraw)
- Barney Rubble (from The Flintstones) (1959–1961; The Flagstones pilot and season two episodes 1, 2, 5, 6, and 9 only)
- Big Gruesome
- Bingo (of The Banana Splits)
- "Bring 'Em Back Alive" Clive
- Brutus the Lion (of The Roman Holidays)
- Cap'n Crunch
- Captain Skyhook (of The Space Kidettes)
- Chilly Willy
- Cogswell
- Colonel Pot Shot
- Dixie Mouse (of Pixie and Dixie and Mr. Jinks)
- Droopy (1955; Deputy Droopy)
- Elroy Jetson
- Fibber Fox (of Yakky Doodle)
- Fred Flintstone (1959; The Flagstones pilot only)
- Gabby Gator (of Woody Woodpecker)
- Gooney the "Gooney Bird" Albatross
- Hair Bear (of Help!... It's the Hair Bear Bunch)
- Henry Orbit
- Hokey Wolf
- Huckleberry Hound
- Hustle (of The CB Bears)
- J. Wellington Wimpy in The All New Popeye Hour
- Jonathan Wellington "Mudsy" Muddlemore (of The Funky Phantom)
- Karlos K. Krinkelbein (from the 1971 animated TV special version of The Cat in the Hat)
- Lambsy (of "It's the Wolf" on Cattanooga Cats)
- Lippy the Lion
- Loopy De Loop
- Louie the Labrador (from The Dogfather)
- Maxie the Polar Bear
- Mr. Jinks (of Pixie and Dixie and Mr. Jinks)
- Peter Perfect, Red Max, Rock Slag, Rufus Ruffcut, and Sgt. Blast (from Wacky Races)
- Peter Potamus
- Pug (from The Dogfather; first episode only)
- Quick Draw McGraw
- Quisp
- Raggedy Andy (in The Great Santa Claus Caper (1978) and The Pumpkin Who Couldn't Smile (1979))
- Reddy the dog (from The Ruff & Reddy Show)
- Scooby-Dum (The Scooby-Doo Show)
- Smedley the Dog (from the Chilly Willy cartoons)
- Snagglepuss
- Snap, Crackle and Pop (of Rice Krispies)
- Super Snooper and Blabber Mouse
- Spike the Bulldog (of Spike and Tyke) (1949–1957)
- Stick and Duke (of Posse Impossible)
- The Weather Man, The Senses Taker, The Terrible Trivium, and the Gelatinous Giant from The Phantom Tollbooth
- Undercover Elephant
- Wally Gator
- Wolf (from the Droopy cartoons)
- Yahooey (from Yippee, Yappee and Yahooey)
- Yogi Bear

Butler voiced most of these characters for decades, in both TV shows and in some commercials. The breakfast cereal mascot Cap'n Crunch became an icon of sorts on Saturday morning TV through many commercials produced by Jay Ward. Butler played Cap'n from the 1960s to the 1980s. He based the voice on that of character actor Charles Butterworth. In 1961, while Mel Blanc was recovering from a road accident, Daws Butler substituted for him to voice Barney Rubble in five episodes of The Flintstones (The Hit Songwriter, Droop-Along Flintstone, Fred Flintstone Woos Again, The Rock Quarry Story, The Little White Lie). Butler had previously voiced the characters of Fred Flintstone and Barney Rubble in the 90 second pilot for the series (when it was called The Flagstones).

In 1964, Butler was featured as Huckleberry Hound on a 45 rpm record, "Bingo, Ringo", a comedic story combining The Beatles' drummer Ringo Starr and Lorne Greene's hit record "Ringo".

In Wacky Races, Butler provided the voices for a number of the racers, Rock Slag, Big Gruesome, the Red Max, Sgt. Blast, Peter Perfect, and Rufus Ruffcut. He voiced a penguin and a turtle in the movie Mary Poppins, his only known work for Disney. Along with Stan Freberg, Paul Frees and June Foray, Butler also provided voices for children's records featuring recreations of several successful Disney cartoons and films.

== Inspirations ==
Yogi Bear began as an impression of Art Carney in the role of Ed Norton in The Honeymooners.

Snagglepuss began as an impression of Bert Lahr as The Cowardly Lion in The Wizard of Oz. When Snagglepuss began appearing in commercials for Kellogg's Cocoa Krispies in 1961, Lahr threatened to sue Butler for "stealing" his voice. As part of the settlement, the disclaimer "Snagglepuss voice by Daws Butler" was required to appear on each commercial.

Huckleberry Hound was inspired by a North Carolina neighbor of Butler's wife's family.

== Later life ==
In the 1970s, Butler was the voice of "Hair Bear" on Help!... It's the Hair Bear Bunch! and a few characters in minor cartoons such as C.B. Bears. On Laff-a-Lympics, he was virtually the entire "Yogi Yahooey" team. He also played the title character in The Funky Phantom, and Louie and Pug on The Pink Panther Show. In 1977, he guest-starred as Captain Numo and his lackey Schultz on the What's New, Mr. Magoo? episode "Secret Agent Magoo".

Apart from specials and commercials, Butler was less prolific in the 1970s and 1980s until a revival of The Jetsons and Hanna-Barbera's crossover series Yogi's Treasure Hunt, both in 1985. In 1983, he voiced the title character Wacky WallWalker in Deck the Halls with Wacky Walls.

In 1975, Butler began an acting workshop which spawned such talents as Nancy Cartwright, Corey Burton, Joe Bevilacqua, Bill Farmer, Pat Parris, Tony Pope, Linda Gary, Bob Bergen, Greg Berg, Greg Burson, Mona Marshall, Brian Cummings, Sherry Lynn, Joey Camen, Keith Scott, Sonny Melendrez, Charles Howerton, Hal Rayle, Andre Stojka, and writer Earl Kress.

In the year of his death, The Good, the Bad, and Huckleberry Hound was released, featuring most of his early characters.

== Personal life ==
Daws met and married Myrtis Martin in 1943 while he was in the United States Navy during World War II. They had four sons, David, Don, Paul and Charles, and remained married until his death in 1988.

== Death ==
Butler died of a heart attack on May 18, 1988, at Cedars-Sinai Medical Center at age 71. A few months before he died, he contracted pneumonia, and had suffered a stroke a few months before that. The television special Hanna-Barbera's 50th: A Yabba Dabba Doo Celebration was dedicated to him. Many of his roles were assumed by Greg Burson, whom Butler personally trained until his death.

Myrtis Mayfield Martin Butler (born January 13, 1917, Stanly County, North Carolina) died on November 15, 2018, in Beverly Hills, California at the age of 101. She was buried next to Daws in Holy Cross Cemetery, Culver City.

== Legacy ==
Butler trained many voice actors, including Nancy Cartwright (the voice of Bart Simpson), Corey Burton (the voice of Count Dooku in several animated Star Wars series, as well as Dale in Chip 'n' Dale), Bill Farmer (the 21st-century voice of Goofy, Pluto, and Horace Horsecollar), Bob Bergen (the voice of Porky Pig), Joe Bevilacqua (whom Butler personally taught how to do all his characters), Sherry Lynn, Greg Burson (the voice of Yogi Bear and Bugs Bunny) and Mona Marshall (the voice of various characters in South Park). Butler's voice and scripts were a frequent part of Bevilacqua's now-defunct XM show.

Bevilacqua also wrote Butler's official biography, published by Bear Manor Media. A new book of cartoon scripts written by Butler and Joe Bevilacqua, Uncle Dunkle and Donnie: Fractured Fables, was scheduled for publication in the fall of 2009. A four-volume, 4½-hour audio set of Uncle Dunkle and Donnie was to be simultaneously released, with Bevilacqua performing all 97 characters in 35 stories. Butler also trained Hal Rayle, who said that his best-known character of Doyle Cleverlobe from Galaxy High School should sound like "Elroy Jetson after he finished puberty".

== In popular culture ==
- The video Daws Butler: Voice Magician is a 1987 documentary of Butler's career, from his pre-MGM days through his teaming with Freberg in 1949 and teaming with Don Messick in 1957. It was originally seen as a PBS pledge-drive special.
- Former Butler protégé Joe Bevilacqua hosted a radio series on XM Satellite Radio's Sonic Theater Channel called The Comedy-O-Rama Hour. It had a regular segment, What the Butler Wrote: Scenes from the Daws Butler Workshop, with rare scripts of Butler's performed by his students (including Nancy Cartwright) and rare recordings of Butler himself. Bevilacqua has also co-authored (with Ben Ohmart) the authorized biography book Daws Butler, Characters Actor, and edited the book Scenes for Actors and Voices written by Butler, both published by Bear Manor Media.
- Butler was a contestant on Groucho Marx's quiz show You Bet Your Life in 1960. The studio audience did not recognize him until he began speaking like Huckleberry Hound. He and his partner Marie Gómez split the top prize of $10,000.
- In 1985, Butler was interviewed about his career on Dr. Demento's radio show.

== Filmography ==
=== Animated films and theatrical shorts ===
Year	Title	Roles	Notes
1948	Short Snorts on Sports		Screen Gems (Columbia) Theatrical short
1949	Little Rural Riding Hood	City Wolf / Telegram Boy	MGM Theatrical short
1949	Out-Foxed	Fox / Kennel Master	Droopy Theatrical short
1949	The Sailor and the Seagull	Seagull / Bartender / Boss on phone / Insurance Notary	UPA Theatrical short
1950	Punchy de Leon	Crow (disguised as guard)	UPA Theatrical short
1950	Albert in Blunderland (a.k.a. To Be an Ant)	Albert / Movie Narrator / Guard	John Sutherland Theatrical short distributed by MGM
1950	The Chump Champ	Spike / Master of Ceremonies / Fortune Teller / Queen of Sports	Droopy Theatrical short
1950	The Peachy Cobbler	Narrator / The Cobbler	MGM Theatrical short
1950	The Cuckoo Clock	Narrator (The Cat)	MGM Theatrical short
1951	Jerry and the Goldfish	Chef François	Tom and Jerry Theatrical short
1951	Droopy's Double Trouble	Mr. Theeves / Spike (one line)	Droopy Theatrical short
1951	Fresh Laid Plans	Black Market Crow / Laid Off Worker	John Sutherland theatrical short distributed by Metro-Goldwyn-Mayer
1952	Gift Wrapped	Narrator	Sylvester and Tweety Theatrical short
1952	Magical Maestro	Mysto the Magician	MGM Theatrical short
1952	One Cab's Family	John the Cab / Doctor	MGM Theatrical short
1952	A Case for Hypnosis	Doctor Twiddle	
1953	Little Johnny Jet	John the Bomber	MGM Theatrical short
1953	The T.V. of Tomorrow	Gambler	MGM Theatrical short
1953	The Three Little Pups	Wolf / Narrator	Droopy Theatrical short
1954	Crazy Mixed-Up Pup	Samuel / The Dog/Milkman	Walter Lantz Theatrical short
1954	Billy Boy	Wolf	MGM Theatrical short
1954	Under the Counter Spy	Hammerer	Woody Woodpecker Theatrical short
1954	Pet Peeve	George	Tom and Jerry Theatrical short
1954	Convict Concerto	Police Officer	Woody Woodpecker Theatrical short
1954	I'm Cold	Smedley	Chilly Willy Theatrical short
1955	Pecos Pest	Announcer	Tom and Jerry Theatrical short
1955	Deputy Droopy	Sheriff / Droopy / Tall Robber (ending lines)	Droopy Theatrical short
1955	Hot and Cold Penguin	Smedley	Chilly Willy Theatrical short
1955	Heir-Conditioned	Cat	Sylvester and Tweety Theatrical short
1955	The Tree Medic	Tree Surgeon	Walter Lantz Theatrical short
1955	Sh-h-h-h-h-h	Mr. Twiddle / Doctor / Hotel Manager	Walter Lantz Theatrical short
1955	Pup on a Picnic	Spike	Tom and Jerry Theatrical short
1955	Smarty Cat	Butch	Tom and Jerry Theatrical short
1956	Down Beat Bear	Radio Announcer	Tom and Jerry Theatrical short
1956	Barbary Coast Bunny	Nasty Canasta	Looney Tunes Theatrical short
1956	Wideo Wabbit	Bugs Bunny imitating Groucho Marx / Bugs Bunny imitating Ed Norton	Merrie Melodies Theatrical short
1956	Yankee Dood It	Shoemaker	Looney Tunes Theatrical short
1956	Rocket-Bye Baby	Narrator / Joe Wilbur / Capt. Schmideo / Lecturer	Merrie Melodies Theatrical short
1956	Barbecue Brawl	Spike	Tom and Jerry Theatrical short
1956	Stupor Duck	Narrator / Newspaper Editor / Mountain Climber #2	Daffy Duck Theatrical short
1956	Magoo's Puddle Jumper	Waldo	Mr. Magoo Theatrical short
1956	After the Ball	Lumberjack Bear	Woody Woodpecker short
1956	Woody Meets Davy Crewcut	Davy Crewcut	Woody Woodpecker short
1956	The Ostrich Egg and I	Sam	Walter Lantz short
1956	Operation Cold Feet	Smedley	Chilly Willy short
1956	Hold That Rock	Smedley	Chilly Willy short
1956	Half-Fare Hare	Ralph Kramden / Ed Norton	Bugs Bunny short
1956	The Honey-Mousers	Ralph Krumden / Ned Morton	Looney Tunes short
1956	Raw! Raw! Rooster!	Rhode Island Red	Looney Tunes short
1957	Tops with Pops	Spike	Tom and Jerry Theatrical short
1957	Tom's Photo Finish	George / Spike	Tom and Jerry short
1957	Give and Tyke	Spike / Stray Dog / Dog Catcher	Spike and Tyke short
1957	Scat Cats	Spike / George / Lightning/Meathead	Spike and Tyke short
1957	Blackboard Jumble	Wolf / Teacher	Droopy short
1957	Drafty, Isn't It?	Narrator / Ralph Phillips	Warner Bros short
1957	Mucho Mouse	Tom / Jerry / Lightning	Tom and Jerry short
1957	Go Fly a Kit	Counter Man	Looney Tunes short
1957	International Woodpecker	George Washington	Woody Woodpecker short
1957	The Unbearable Salesman	Bear	Woody Woodpecker short
1957	Cheese It, the Cat!	Ralph Krumden / Ned Morton	Looney Tunes short
1957	Fodder and Son	Windy and Breezy	Walter Lantz short
1958	Mutts About Racing	Announcer	Droopy short
1958	Sheep Wrecked	Wolf	Droopy short
1958	Everglade Raid	Al I. Gator	Woody Woodpecker short
1958	Watch the Birdie	Birdwatcher	Woody Woodpecker short
1958	Tree's a Crowd	Colonel Munch	Woody Woodpecker short
1958	A Bird in a Bonnet	Sewer Worker	Looney Tunes short
1958	A Chilly Reception	Smedley	Chilly Willy short
1958	Polar Pests	Clyde	Chilly Willy short
1958	Little TeleVillain	Smedley / Mr. Stoop / Car Salesman	Chilly Willy short
1958	A Waggily Tale	Junior / Elvis / Dad / Johnny / Melvin	Looney Tunes short
1959	Truant Student	Windy / Breezy / Truant Officer Willoughby	Walter Lantz short
1959	The Alphabet Conspiracy	Jabberwock	TV movie
1959	1001 Arabian Nights	Omar the Rugmaker	UPA's first animated feature film
1959	Robinson Gruesome	Narrator / Robinson Gruesome / Ape	Walter Lantz short
1959	Trick or Tweet	Sam	Sylvester and Tweety short
1959	Yukon Have It	Smedley / Caribou Lou	Chilly Willy short
1959	Merry Minstrel Magoo	Waldo / Dentist	UPA short
1959	Here Today, Gone Tamale	Mice	Looney Tunes short
1959	Romp in a Swamp	Al I. Gator	Woody Woodpecker short
1959–1964	Loopy De Loop	Loopy De Loop / additional voices	48 Theatrical shorts
1960	Mice Follies	Ralph Crumden / Ned Morton	Looney Tunes short
1960	Mouse and Garden	Sam the Cat	Looney Tunes short
1960	Southern Fried Hospitality	Narrator / Gabby Gator	Walter Lantz short
1964	Hey There, It's Yogi Bear	Yogi Bear / Airplane Pilot / Ranger Tom / Twippo	Hanna-Barbera's first animated feature film
1964	Mary Poppins	Turtle / Penguin	His only work for Disney
1970	The Phantom Tollbooth	Weather Man / Senses Taker / The Terrible Trivium / The Gelatinous Giant	Animated feature film
1974-1975	The Dogfather	Louie the Labrador / Pugg (first episode only) / additional voices	Theatrical cartoon series
1980	Yogi's First Christmas	Yogi Bear / Snagglepuss / Huckleberry Hound / Augie Doggie	Animated TV movie
1987	Yogi's Great Escape	Yogi Bear / Quick Draw McGraw / Wally Gator / Snagglepuss	Animated TV movie
1987	The Jetsons Meet the Flintstones	Elroy Jetson / Henry Orbit / Cogswell	Animated TV movie
1987	Yogi Bear and the Magical Flight of the Spruce Goose	Yogi Bear / Huckleberry Hound / Quick Draw McGraw/ Snagglepuss / Augie Doggie	Animated TV movie
1988	The Good, the Bad, and Huckleberry Hound	Huckleberry Hound / Yogi Bear / Quick Draw McGraw / Snagglepuss / Hokey Wolf / Baba Looey / Peter Potamus	Animated TV movie
1988	Rockin' with Judy Jetson	Elroy Jetson	Animated TV movie; posthumously released
1988	Yogi and the Invasion of the Space Bears	Yogi Bear	Animated TV movie; posthumously released (final role)

=== Television ===
Year	Title	Roles	Notes
1949–1954	Time for Beany	Beany Boy / Captain Huffenpuff	His television debut
1957–1960	The Ruff and Reddy Show	Reddy / Pinky / Olaf / Scary Harry / Safari / Killer / various	
1958–1961	The Huckleberry Hound Show	Huckleberry Hound / Yogi Bear / Dixie / Mr. Jinks / Hokey Wolf / various	
1958–1961	Pixie and Dixie and Mr. Jinks	Dixie / Mr. Jinks / additional voices	
1959–1960	Rocky and His Friends	Various "Fractured Fairy Tales" characters	
1959–1961	The Quick Draw McGraw Show	Quick Draw McGraw / Baba Looey / Snuffles / various	
1959–1961	Augie Doggie and Doggie Daddy	Augie Doggie / Snagglepuss / various	
1959–1961	Snooper and Blabber	Super Snooper / Blabber Mouse / various	
1960	The Bugs Bunny Show	Various characters	
1960–1961	Hokey Wolf	Hokey Wolf	
1960–1966	The Flintstones	Barney Rubble / Yogi Bear / additional voices	Note: He appeared in 24 episodes, he played Barney Rubble in six of those episodes, and Yogi Bear in another episode.
1961–1962	The Yogi Bear Show	Yogi Bear / Snagglepuss / Fibber Fox / Alfy Gator / Hokey Wolf / Huckleberry Hound / Quick Draw McGraw / Augie Doggie / Super Snooper / Blabber Mouse / Baba Looey / Dixie / Mr. Jinks / additional voices	
1961–1962	Snagglepuss	Snagglepuss	
1961–1962	Yakky Doodle	Fibber Fox / The Cat / Alfy Gator	
1961	Top Cat	A.T. Jazz (All That Jazz)	Episode: "All That Jazz"
1961	The Bullwinkle Show	Aesop Jr. / Additional voices (voice, uncredited)	
1962	Wally Gator	Wally Gator / additional voices	
1962	Lippy the Lion and Hardy Har Har	Lippy the Lion / additional voices	
1962–1963/1985–1987	The Jetsons	Elroy Jetson / Cogswell Coggs / Henry Orbit	
1964	The Woody Woodpecker Show	Chilly Willy / Andy Panda / Smedley	
1964	Jonny Quest	Maharaja / Corbin / Gunderson	
1964–1965	The Famous Adventures of Mr. Magoo	various voices	
1964–1966	The Peter Potamus Show	Peter Potamus	
1964–1966	Yippee, Yappee and Yahooey	Yahooey	
1966	Alice in Wonderland or What's a Nice Kid like You Doing in a Place like This?	The King of Hearts / The March Hare / Sportscaster	TV special
1966–1967	The Space Kidettes	Captain Skyhook	
1967	George of the Jungle	"Tiger" Titheridge / Additional Voices	
1967–1968	Off to See the Wizard	Scarecrow / Tin Man / Wizard of Oz	
1968	The Bugs Bunny/Road Runner Hour	Various Characters	
1968–1969	Wacky Races	Rock Slag / Big Gruesome / Red Max / Sergeant Blast / Peter Perfect / Rufus Ruffcut	
1968–1969	The New Adventures of Huckleberry Finn	Various voices	
1969	The Banana Splits Adventure Hour	Bingo	
1969–1971	Cattanooga Cats	Lambsy / Crumden	
1970	Harlem Globetrotters		Uncredited
1971	The Cat in the Hat	Karlos K. Krinklebein	Animated TV special
1971	The Funky Phantom	Jonathan Wellington "Mudsy" Muddlemore/Fingers	
1971	Help!... It's the Hair Bear Bunch!	Hair Bear / Bumbo the Elephant / Bananas the Gorilla / Furface the Lion / Film director	
1972	The New Scooby-Doo Movies	Larry Fine / Curly Joe / Various Characters	
1972	A Christmas Story	Gumdrop	TV special
1972	The Roman Holidays	Brutus the Lion	
1972	Yogi's Ark Lark	Yogi Bear / Huckleberry Hound / Quick Draw McGraw / Snagglepuss / Wally Gator / Peter Potamus / Augie Doggie / Lippy the Lion / Dixie / Baba Looey / Lambsy / Top Cat	TV special
1972	The Banana Splits in Hocus Pocus Park	Bingo / Frog / Octopus	TV special
1972	The Adventures of Robin Hoodnik	Scrounger / Richard	TV special
1972	Wait Till Your Father Gets Home	various voices	
1972–1978	Sesame Street	Warning Cartoon Man / J Train Commentator / various voices	7 episodes
1973	Yogi's Gang	Yogi Bear / Huckleberry Hound / Quick Draw McGraw / Snagglepuss / Wally Gator / Peter Potamus / Augie Doggie / Hokey Wolf / Lippy the Lion / Baba Looey / Tantrum	
1974	Hong Kong Phooey	Blubber / Stick / Big Duke	episode: Comedy Cowboys
1976	The Sylvester & Tweety Show	Various Characters	
1977	CB Bears	Hustle / Stick / Duke	
1977	Laff-A-Lympics	Yogi Bear / Augie Doggie / Huckleberry Hound / Quick Draw McGraw / Wally Gator / Snagglepuss / Mr. Jinks / Dixie / Hokey Wolf / Super Snooper / Blabber / Scooby Dum / Dirty Dalton	
1977	Fred Flintstone and Friends		
1978	The Hanna-Barbera Happy Hour		TV special
1978	Yogi's Space Race	Yogi Bear / Huckleberry Hound /Quick Draw McGraw	
1978	Galaxy Goof-Ups	Yogi Bear / Huckleberry Hound	
1978	The All New Popeye Hour	Wimpy	
1978	Hanna-Barbera's All-Star Comedy Ice Revue	Yogi Bear / Hair Bear / Huckleberry Hound / Snagglepuss / Quick Draw McGraw / Bingo	TV special
1979	The Hanna-Barbera Hall of Fame: Yabba Dabba Doo II	Himself – Various Character Voices	TV special
1979	Casper's First Christmas	Yogi Bear / Huckleberry Hound / Quick Draw McGraw / Snagglepuss / Augie Doggie	TV special
1982	Woody Woodpecker and His Friends	Various Voices	
1982	Yogi Bear's All Star Comedy Christmas Caper	Yogi Bear / Huckleberry Hound / Snagglepuss / Quick Draw McGraw / Mr. Jinks / Hokey Wolf / Augie Doggie / Snooper and Blabber / Dixie / Wally Gator	TV special
1985–1988	Yogi's Treasure Hunt	Yogi Bear / Snagglepuss / Huckleberry Hound / Quick Draw McGraw / Augie Doggie / Snooper and Blabber / Baba Looey / Undercover Elephant / Yippee Coyote / Hokey Wolf / Lippy the Lion / Mr. Jinks / Peter Potamus	
1986	The Bugs Bunny and Tweety Show	Various Characters	
1986	The Flintstones' 25th Anniversary Celebration	Yogi Bear / Huckleberry Hound / Quick Draw McGraw	TV special

=== Live-action roles ===
Year	Title	Roles	Notes
1952	Nice Try, Virgil	Virgil	Short film written by Larry Clemmons
1960	You Bet Your Life	Himself	TV Episode
1965 or 1966	Lapwing	Unknown	Silent workprint
1975	Doc Savage: The Man of Bronze	Habeas Corpus	Pig grunts; uncredited
1978	Barnaby and Me	Barnaby the Koala	TV film

Preceded by None	Voice of Yogi Bear; 1958–1988	Succeeded by Greg Burson
Preceded by Arnold Stang	Voice of Top Cat; 1972 film Yogi's Ark Lark	Succeeded by Tom Kenny
