= Spike and Tyke =

1957 short films

- Title card of the Spike and Tyke cartoons.
- Directed by: William Hanna; Joseph Barbera
- Written by: Homer Brightman
- Based on: Tom and Jerry by: William Hanna; Joseph Barbera
- Produced by: William Hanna; Joseph Barbera
- Starring: Daws Butler; William Hanna
- Music by: Scott Bradley
- Production company: MGM Cartoons
- Distributed by: Metro-Goldwyn-Mayer
- Release dates: March 29, 1957 (Give and Tyke); July 26, 1957 (Scat Cats)
- Running time: 6 minutes
- Country: United States
- Language: English

Spike and Tyke is an American theatrical animated short subject series, based upon the English bulldog father-and-son team from Metro-Goldwyn-Mayer's Tom and Jerry cartoons. The characters first appeared in the Tom and Jerry series in the 1940s.

Only two films were made in this spin-off series: Give and Tyke and Scat Cats, both made and released in 1957, and produced in CinemaScope, as the cartoon studio shut down the year the spin-off series was started. Homer Brightman wrote both the episodes.

The cartoons were produced and directed by Tom and Jerry creators William Hanna and Joseph Barbera, and were among the last of the original MGM theatrical cartoons made. The studio was shut down in mid-1957 and Hanna and Barbera would move on to television animation production success with their own Hanna-Barbera Productions.

Spike was voiced by Billy Bletcher, and later Daws Butler. Tyke did not talk in the theatrical shorts (possibly his barks were done by co-creator William Hanna), but did speak on the Fox Kids television series Tom & Jerry Kids, for which the duo appeared in their own segments, and occasionally in the Tom and Jerry segments. Spike and Tyke were voiced by Richard Gautier and Patric Zimmerman, respectively. Later, they appeared in the straight-to-video film Tom and Jerry: The Magic Ring. Spike was voiced by Maurice LaMarche, and Tyke's barks were done by Frank Welker.

When they moved to television, Hanna and Barbera reworked the concept into the Augie Doggie and Doggie Daddy segments of the Quick Draw McGraw show.

== Spike & Tyke shorts ==
#	Title	Release date
1	Give and Tyke	March 29, 1957
2	Scat Cats	July 26, 1957

=== Availability ===
In 2025, both Spike and Tyke solo shorts were released - uncut and restored (in their original CinemaScope aspect ratios) - as bonus shorts on Tom and Jerry: The Complete CinemaScope Collection and Tom and Jerry: The Golden Era Anthology Blu-ray sets from the Warner Archive Collection.

== See also ==
- Spike and Tyke (characters)
- Augie Doggie and Doggie Daddy
