= Chilly Willy (film) =

- Directed by: Paul J. Smith
- Story by: Homer Brightman
- Produced by: Walter Lantz
- Starring: Sara Berner; Dal McKennon
- Music by: Clarence Wheeler
- Animation by: Gil Turner; Laverne Harding; Robert Bentley
- Layouts by: Raymond Jacobs; Art Landy
- Color process: Technicolor
- Production company: Walter Lantz Productions
- Distributed by: Universal-International
- Release date: December 21, 1953
- Running time: 6 minutes
- Language: English

Chilly Willy is a 1953 Chilly Willy cartoon and the first in the Chilly Willy series. Chilly Willy would have a major redesign in his next cartoon, I'm Cold, by cartoon director Tex Avery.

== Plot ==
A schooner anchors at the South Pole, and the skipper goes ashore and leaves the ship's mascot, a St. Bernard, to stand watch and guard the ship. A small penguin, Chilly Willy, sees the ship and tries to get warm by its stove. The watchdog attempts to get rid of him, but Willy manages to get the dog drunk from the rum in its own cask. The captain returns to find Willy saving the ship from sinking, while the dog is found sleeping it off. Chilly Willy is made mascot and the dog is tossed in the ship's brig.
