= The New Woody Woodpecker Show =

American animated television series

- Genre: Comedy
- Based on: Woody Woodpecker by Universal Pictures & Walter Lantz
- Developed by: Bob Jaques; Kelly Armstrong
- Directed by: Mauro Casalese (seasons 1–2); Alfred Gimeno (seasons 1–2); Kurt Anderson (seasons 1–2); Alan Zaslove (seasons 2–3)
- Voices of: Billy West; Mark Hamill; Andrea Martin; B. J. Ward; Jim Cummings; E. G. Daily; Nika Futterman
- Theme music composer: Jim Latham
- Composer: Thomas Chase Jones
- Country of origin: United States
- Original language: English
- No. of seasons: 3
- No. of episodes: 53 (157 segments) (list of episodes)

Production
- Producers: Sean Roche (season 3); Diane A. Crea (season 3)
- Editor: Ken Solomon
- Running time: 20–21 minutes (7 minutes per segment)
- Production company: Universal Cartoon Studios

Original release
- Network: Fox Kids (seasons 1–2); YTV (season 3)
- Release: May 8, 1999 – July 27, 2002

Related
- The Woody Woodpecker Show (1957–1977); Woody Woodpecker (2018–2022)

The New Woody Woodpecker Show (titled on-screen as The Woody Woodpecker Show) is an American animated comedy television series based on the animated short film series created by cartoonist and animator Walter Lantz. It was co-developed by animators Bob Jaques and Kelly Armstrong, and was produced by Universal Cartoon Studios. The first two seasons (or 40 episodes) aired from May 8, 1999, to December 23, 2000, on Fox's Fox Kids programming block; Universal Cartoon Studios aired the remaining 13 episodes on YTV in Canada from May 4 to July 27, 2002.

The series is an updated version of The Woody Woodpecker Show with characters from the original series and a few new ones appearing in their own segments. Each episode consists of two segments featuring Woody Woodpecker dividing one starring Chilly Willy, with Winnie Woodpecker and Knothead & Splinter also starring in some segments. 53 episodes (consisting of 155 segments, as well as one episode-length Christmas special and one classic Chilly Willy cartoon) were produced.

== Characters ==
=== Woody Woodpecker ===
- Woody Woodpecker (voiced by Billy West) is a mischievous pileated woodpecker who lives in a tree-house overlooking his landlady's house in the suburbs of the Southland. His personality mirrors Tom Sawyer, a lazy and crazy moocher or even a freeloader, often looking for ways to get by without lifting a finger. This, however, does not endear him to his rivals, but Woody does not take their resistance lightly. His father is Scottish, and Woody is proud of his Scottish heritage, even though he uses English golf balls and oftentimes shows English traits when being Lord Crinkle, or rather British traits as both countries are from the same location.
- Winnie Woodpecker (voiced by B. J. Ward) is a female pileated woodpecker and Woody's best friend/girlfriend who tends to get into her own misadventures. She has a more dignified persona than Woody's.
- Knothead (voiced by E. G. Daily) and Splinter (voiced by Nika Futterman) are Woody and Winnie's nephew and niece, respectively, a pair of young pileated woodpeckers who can't help but give to their uncle (and anybody else) a hard time.
- Buzz Buzzard (voiced by Mark Hamill) is a sleazy common buzzard who is the main antagonist of the series. He always concocts scams and cons on Woody and Winnie or Knothead and Splinter, though the woodpeckers frequently outsmart him.
  - Tweaky the Lackey (also voiced by Mark Hamill) is a domestic canary who is usually Buzz's henchman, often reluctant about it.
- Wally Walrus (also voiced by Billy West) is a Swedish walrus who is Woody's neighbor and long-time foil but is not as antagonistic as either Buzz or other characters with Woody being always greedy and looking for mischief to ensue. Despite his rivalry with Woody, there are times where the duo team up and work together.
- Ms. Meany (voiced by Andrea Martin) is Woody's ugly old landlady who rents the tree-house Woody lives in and Wally's neighbor. Being more violent than other characters, she is generally more antagonistic and mean-spirited than both Buzz and Wally. She is often portrayed as a hard worker who takes her job seriously and respects those in authority.
- Dapper Denver Dooley (voiced by Jim Cummings) is an obnoxious man-child who always tries to put a damper on Woody's fun.

=== Chilly Willy ===
- Chilly Willy is a mute penguin who lives in Antarctica. His misadventures result from his constant endeavors to fill his empty stomach and/or find relief from the cold. Despite his innocent demeanor, Chilly is a troublemaker.
- Smedley (voiced by Billy West) is a hound dog that is frequently at odds with Chilly, though usually portrayed as more an authority figure than an antagonist. He is very easygoing and generally does not break his calm demeanor, but Chilly always pushes Smedley's patience to the breaking point.
- Chilly Lilly is a female penguin who is Chilly Willy's girlfriend and appears in the episode "Chilly Lilly".
- Maxie the Polar Bear (voiced by Rob Paulsen) is a polar bear with various roles and makes a few appearances on Chilly's segments.
- Sgt. Hogwash (voiced by Blake Clark) is a pig military officer who operates a government base in the Antarctic that's plagued by Chilly's mischievous antics.
- Major Bull (voiced by Kevin Michael Richardson) is a bull who is Hogwash's superior.

=== Other characters ===
- Dr. Doug Nutts (voiced by Billy West) is a physician who is impersonating Don Knotts. He appears in the episodes "Woody & the Termite", "Medical Winnie Pig", "Chilly & the Fur-Bearing Trout", "Silent Treatment" and "Painfaker".
- Mother Nature (voiced by B. J. Ward) is a fairy who usually gets onto Woody for being too lazy to fulfill his role in nature. She appears in the episodes "Woody and the Termite", "Downsized Woody", "Whistle Stop Woody" and "Teacher's Pet". In "Teacher's Pet", her appearance is different from that in the three prior episodes. She retains her original pre-design in Crazy Castle 5.
- Creepy Badger (voiced by Mark Hamill) is a creepy and psychotic badger. While he generally isn't a real villain, he has worked alongside Wally Walrus as an assistant and played the role as the main antagonist in "Hide and Seek". He speaks in a gravelly, deep, and generally creepy voice. He also really loves tobogganing. His catchphrase is "Hi-ya, buddy!".
- Nicky Knickknacker (voiced by Tim Curry) is a high society pileated woodpecker thief who appears in the episode "Eenie, Meany, Out You Go".
- Billy (voiced by John Kassir and Billy West) and Louie (voiced by Rob Paulsen) are a pair of troublemaker dogs that have the tendency to annoy Knothead and Splinter. Billy is the aggressive leader of the duo, while Louie is a little dumb.
- Woody's Father (voiced by Corey Burton) is a pileated woodpecker who is the father of Woody. He is Scottish-accented, similarly to Scrooge McDuck.
- The Wild Cave Woodpecker (voiced by Rob Paulsen) is a caveman who is a woodpecker appearing in the episode "Wild Woodpecker".
- Judge (also voiced by Billy West) is a judge who appears in the episodes "Painfaker", "Stuck on You" and "Couples Therapy".
- Willy Walrus (also voiced by Rob Paulsen) is Wally's nephew who appears in the episodes "Just Say Uncle" and "Stuck on You".
- Cupid (also voiced by Billy West) is a cupid who appears in the episode "Date with Destiny".
- Woodrow Woodpecker (voiced by Carlos Alazraqui) is a nerdy woodpecker who appears in "Teacher's Pet".

=== Additional voices ===
- Jess Harnell
- Peter Jason
- Brogan Roche
- Pamela Adlon
- Julie Brown
- Rodger Bumpass
- Corey Burton
- Joe Lala
- Ellen Idelson
- Eugene Roche
- Jeff Bennett
- Diane A. Crea
- Rob Paulsen
- Dan Castellaneta
- Pat Fraley
- Candi Milo
- Tress MacNeille
- Charles Martin Smith
- Kevin Michael Richardson
- Tom Kenny
- Debi Derryberry
- Grey DeLisle
- Quinton Flynn
- Susan Silo
- Tino Insana

== Episodes ==
=== Series overview ===
Season	Segments	Episodes	Originally released		
Season	Segments	Episodes	First released	Last released	Network
1	69	23	May 8, 1999	December 25, 1999	Fox Kids
2	49	17	September 2, 2000	December 23, 2000	Fox Kids
3	39	13	May 4, 2002	July 27, 2002	YTV

The segments indicate in colors by which characters starred in them:

- Red = Woody Woodpecker (104 segments + Christmas special)
- Blue = Chilly Willy (30 segments + "A Classic Chilly Cartoon")
- Pink = Winnie Woodpecker (11 segments)
- Sky Blue = Knothead & Splinter (10 segments)

=== Season 1 (1999) ===
No. overall	No. in season	Title	Directed by	Written by	Storyboard by	Original release date
1a	1a	"Wiener Wars"	Mauro Casalese	Eric Vesbit	Kurt Anderson & Peter Ferk	May 8, 1999
Woody sells hotdogs after the original owner of his favorite stand says he will stop, but Wally does not agree with his idea.
1b	1b	"Electric Chilly"	Mauro Casalese	Travis Clark, Robbie Thompson & Richard Pursel	Stephen DeStefano, Jim Smith & Wendell Washer	May 8, 1999
Chilly's TV gets repeatedly plugged out by Smedley unintentionally, making Chilly come up with different ideas to stop him.
1c	1c	"Woody & the Termite"	Mauro Casalese	Robbie Thompson	Lane Reichert & Jill Colbert	May 8, 1999
Mother Nature says Woody's behind his pecking quota, so Woody hires a termite to do his job for him. This soon backfires when the termite decides to make mischief.
2a	2a	"Fake Vacation"	Mauro Casalese	Travis Clark, Robbie Thompson & Bill Wray	Mike Fontinelli & Chrystal Klabunde	May 15, 1999
Buzz attempts to fool Woody by making a fake vacation where Woody will see hola-fraus, but Woody then reports him for a scam for trying to steal his cash.
2b	2b	"Medical Winnie Pig"	Mauro Casalese	Travis Clark	Tom Bernardo, Eddie Fitzgerald & David Williams	May 15, 1999
Winnie attempts to get a career in medicine at a hospital, but causes trouble instead, while Dr. Doug Nutts tries to get Winnie into his cloning project.
2c	2c	"Cable Ace"	Mauro Casalese	Travis Clark	Alfred Gimeno & Rafael Rosado	May 15, 1999
Woody tries to watch his favorite show, The Highland Games, on Wally's TV.
3a	3a	"Temper, Temper"	Mauro Casalese	Travis Clark, Drew Daywalt & David Schneider	Butch Hartman & Bob Onorato	May 22, 1999
Ms. Meany is diagnosed with anger issues that may make her lose her mind. It falls on the same day where Woody is celebrating The Highland Games.
3b	3b	"A Classic Chilly Cartoon"	Tex Avery	Michael Maltese	Tex Avery	May 22, 1999
A presentation of The Legend of Rockabye Point from 1955.
3c	3c	"Crash Course"	Mauro Casalese	Travis Clark & Robbie Thompson	Kurt Anderson	May 22, 1999
Winnie sells her TV to use the money for flying lessons, but Woody wants the TV back and decides to make trouble at the flying academy.
4a	4a	"Woody's Ship of Ghouls"	Mauro Casalese	Travis Clark	Kurt Anderson	May 29, 1999
Woody is taken onto a ship by a ghost crew, thinking there is free food. Woody then tries to convince the crew to let him go.
4b	4b	"Bad Hair Day"	Mauro Casalese	Sherri Schrader & Travis Clark	Bob Onorato & Chris Reccardi	May 29, 1999
Winnie opens a hair salon, but Buzz causes trouble for her customers.
4c	4c	"Downsized Woody"	Mauro Casalese	Travis Clark	Chrystal Klabunde	May 29, 1999
Mother Nature downsizes Woody's rank to a pigeon, and now he has to show Mother Nature that he is not lazy.
5a	5a	"Ya Gonna Eat That?"	Mauro Casalese	Travis Clark, Robbie Thompson, Jim Gomez & Bill Wray	Bob Onorato	June 5, 1999
Wally gets a call from the IRS about his finances and thinks he's too rich with all his food. While Woody is watching, he gets an idea to go steal all of his food.
5b	5b	"Chilly & Hungry"	Mauro Casalese	Robbie Thompson & Richard Pursel	Kelly Armstrong, Jim Smith & Dave Williams	June 5, 1999
Chilly tries to find a way to get warmth, but he runs into Maxie, who tries to be a vegetarian and not eat him.
5c	5c	"Brother Cockroach"	Mauro Casalese	Robbie Thompson	Tom Bernardo, Mauro Casalese & Gary Hoffman	June 5, 1999
A cockroach gets into Woody's home, so Woody tries to get rid of him by making him get a job.
6a	6a	"Father's Day"	Mauro Casalese	Robbie Thompson	Kurt Anderson & Stephen DeStefano	June 12, 1999
Woody and his father both plays golf every year, but he wants to win the trophy this year since his father has won last year. They also happen to play on the day a storm appears.
6b	6b	"Camp Buzzard"	Mauro Casalese	Robbie Thompson	Jill Colbert Trousdale	June 12, 1999
Buzz opens a fake camp so that he can get Woody's money through taking care of Knothead and Splinter.
6c	6c	"He Wouldn't Woody"	Mauro Casalese	Travis Clark	Chris Reccardi & Bob Onorato	June 12, 1999
Woody pecks a petrified tree that causes his mind to switch around, and Wally starts to sense something is wrong.
7a	7a	"Wally's Royal Riot"	Mauro Casalese	Eddie Fitzgerald & Travis Clark	Eddie Fitzgerald & Tom Nelson	June 19, 1999
Woody wants to eat at Chez Wally, but Wally only serves rich customers. Since Wally will not serve him, Woody disguises himself several times to get free food.
7b	7b	"Mexican Chilly"	Mauro Casalese	Travis Clark & Robbie Thompson	Bob Onorato	June 19, 1999
Chilly sneaks onto Smedley's cruise ship for a vacation away from the cold, but Smedley wants him off.
7c	7c	"Sleepwalking Woody"	Mauro Casalese	Travis Clark & Richard Pursel	Eddie Fitzgerald, Jim Smith & David Williams	June 19, 1999
Woody falls into sleep-walking during the night, and Wally tries again and again to rid his home of him.
8a	8a	"Pinheads"	Mauro Casalese	Charles Schneider & Robbie Thompson	Bob Onorato	June 26, 1999
Buzz and Tweaky run a bowling place. Woody pays for a lane and challenges Buzz to win against him, but sees that some cheating is happening.
8b	8b	"The Chilly Show"	Mauro Casalese	Robbie Thompson	Bill Frake	June 26, 1999
Chilly runs into Marty and Helga, who want to get Chilly at first to film him, but then Helga wants Maxie. Chilly then helps out Marty to get rid of Helga.
8c	8c	"Silent Treatment"	Mauro Casalese	Robbie Thompson & Jim Gomez	Mike Fontinelli & Bob Onorato	June 26, 1999
Wally keeps getting annoyed of Woody. He then finds out about the silent treatment, so he decides to be silent around Woody whenever he causes trouble.
9a	9a	"Over the Top"	Mauro Casalese	Mauro Casalese, Travis Clark, Richard Pursel & Robbie Thompson	Brian Mitchell, Jim Smith & Bob Onorato	July 3, 1999
Wally and Woody argue about which sport is better, skiing or snowboarding. Both find out that a race is open and decide to challenge each other to see which sport is better.
9b	9b	"Chilly & the Fur-Bearing Trout"	Mauro Casalese	Robbie Thompson & Richard Pursel	Stephen DeStefano, Jim Smith & Bob Onorato	July 3, 1999
Chilly tries to steal Larry's coat, but finds out that he is stealing them himself.
9c	9c	"Painfaker"	Mauro Casalese	Eric Vesbit	Jamie Oliff & Bob Onorato	July 3, 1999
Woody fakes his injuries at the park in order to get Wally to take care of him. Wally is not fond of the idea, but has to go along with it when his house is being watched by his every move.
10a	10a	"Baby Buzzard"	Alfred Gimeno & Mauro Casalese	Travis Clark & Bill Wray	Jill Colbert Trousdale & Chris Reccardi	July 10, 1999
Buzz hears that Woody opens a babysitting job and decides to dress up as a baby in order to steal Woody's furniture.
10b	10b	"Bait & Hook"	Alfred Gimeno & Mauro Casalese	Robbie Thompson	Jeffery Gordon, Tom Nelson & Chris Reccardi	July 10, 1999
Chilly tries to go fishing to get food, but runs into some problems with his bait.
10c	10c	"Bad Weather"	Alfred Gimeno & Mauro Casalese	Robbie Thompson & Jim Gomez	Bob Onorato & Jeffery Gordon	July 10, 1999
Wally buys a weather machine in order to clear the rain and have a pool party. Woody however causes trouble when taking his guest and now Wally decides to mess with his pool party using the weather machine.
11a	11a	"Tee Time"	Kurt Anderson & Alfred Gimeno	Robbie Thompson	Jill Colbert Trousdale	July 17, 1999
Woody enters a competition to get a "hole-in-one" in order to win a free membership. While he is practicing, Wally practices his tuba when he too is invited to play a gig.
11b	11b	"S&K Files"	Kurt Anderson & Alfred Gimeno	Robbie Thompson	Tom Nelson	July 17, 1999
In their efforts to rid the world of space aliens, Splinter and Knothead unknowingly end up ruining Buzz's plans to rob the house.
11c	11c	"Goldiggers"	Kurt Anderson & Alfred Gimeno	Travis Clark	Bob Onorato	July 17, 1999
Woody goes on a trip to find gold, but finds Buzz, who wants to join Woody to steal his secret map in order to take all the gold.
12a	12a	"Mirage Barrage"	Kurt Anderson & Alfred Gimeno	Robbie Thompson	Wendell Washer	July 24, 1999
Woody finds a magic lamp out in the desert, where he finds the great Walrus Genie, Wally, but he is not pleased with Wally's first wish and wishes to be the genie. He then grants Wally's wishes.
12b	12b	"Queen of De-Nile"	Kurt Anderson & Alfred Gimeno	Travis Clark	Llyn Hunter	July 24, 1999
Winnie stumbles upon Wally, who mistakes her for an expert to help him find a tomb. As Winnie helps solves the puzzles inside the tomb, he keeps running into the traps.
12c	12c	"Party Animal"	Kurt Anderson & Alfred Gimeno	Len Janson	Chrystal Klabunde	July 24, 1999
Woody wants to plan a bagpipe appreciation day party, but Ms. Meany won't allow it. He then tries to find ways in order to get the party.
13a	13a	"K-9 Woody-O"	Kurt Anderson & Alfred Gimeno	Len Janson	Tom Nelson	July 31, 1999
Woody has to take care of Ms. Meany's new dog, but he runs into a problem when Wally takes him in and feeds the dog when he's not supposed to.
13b	13b	"Ready for My Close-Up, Mr. Walrus"	Kurt Anderson & Alfred Gimeno	Sean Roche	Jill Colbert Trousdale	July 31, 1999
Winnie wants to be an actor in Hollywood, so she goes to Wally to become a star, but he does not like everything Winnie does, while his boss does.
13c	13c	"Gopher-It"	Kurt Anderson & Alfred Gimeno	Kelly Ward	Bob Onorato	July 31, 1999
Woody goes to play golf, but runs into a pair of gophers who are not letting him play his game.
14a	14a	"Spy-Guy"	Kurt Anderson & Alfred Gimeno	Glenn Leopold	Chrystal Klabunde	August 7, 1999
Woody is given a suitcase to keep safe from any nefarious types, and Buzz wants the suitcase for himself.
14b	14b	"Ye Olde Knothead and Splinter"	Kurt Anderson & Alfred Gimeno	Eleanor Burian-Mohr	Llyn Hunter	August 7, 1999
Knothead and Splinter go to the Ye Olde Time Fair to win games in order to see who's the best.
14c	14c	"Life in the Pass Lane"	Kurt Anderson & Alfred Gimeno	Bruce & Reed Shelly	Wendell Washer	August 7, 1999
Woody and Buzz both enter a Scottish race, but yet again, Buzz is cheating since he wants to win.
15a	15a	"Signed, Sealed, Delivered"	Alfred Gimeno	Rodney Gibbs	Tom Nelson	August 14, 1999
Woody wins an Adventure Box, but is wondering when it will come. When he gets to the post office, Ms. Meany says that he cannot take or open the package until it gets to his home.
15b	15b	"Out to Launch"	Alfred Gimeno	Laren Bright	Jill Colbert Trousdale	August 14, 1999
Winnie returns something to a space program, but gets mistaken for being the astronaut to go to space.
15c	15c	"Spa-Spa Blacksheep"	Alfred Gimeno	Len Janson	Bob Onorato	August 14, 1999
Woody wants to go into a spa when he finds out it is for the rich and famous, but is not allowed since he is not rich by Dooley.
16a	16a	"Pecking Order"	Kurt Anderson	Kelly Ward	Llyn Hunter	August 21, 1999
Woody sends Knothead and Splinter off to a camp in order to get them to improve their behavior.
16b	16b	"Chilly on Ice"	Kurt Anderson	Bill Matheny	Chrystal Klabunde	August 21, 1999
Chilly goes to a sporting event in order to get food, but ends up entering into several events while being chased by Smedley.
16c	16c	"Just Say Uncle"	Kurt Anderson	Travis Clark	Michael V. Bennett	August 21, 1999
Knothead, Splinter and Willy want a certain toy. When they find out there is only one left in stock, they race and fight to see who can get the toy first.
17a	17a	"The Contender"	Alfred Gimeno	Travis Clark	Jill Colbert Trousdale	August 28, 1999
Woody decides to enter a wrestling event for a cash prize, thinking that the "Chump" and sport is easy.
17b	17b	"Snow Way Out"	Alfred Gimeno	Len Janson	Lane Reichert	August 28, 1999
Buzz and Tweaky pretend that they are ski teachers. Woody thinks that something is not right about it, but Knothead and Splinter want to be taught. Woody finally goes in, but wants to watch Buzz and Tweaky to see what they will do.
17c	17c	"Hospital Hi-Jinx"	Alfred Gimeno	Nick DuBois	Tom Nelson & Bob Onorato	August 28, 1999
Woody wants to get free food and care at a hospital, but does not get the good treatment when he meets Ms. Meany as one of the nurses.
18a	18a	"Dr. Buzzard's Time Chamber"	Kurt Anderson	Rick Merwin	Chrystal Klabunde	September 4, 1999
Buzz and Tweaky get Woody to believe that he can travel back in time, so they take his money and get him to believe that he is in the Western world.
18b	18b	"Winnie P.I."	Kurt Anderson	Robbie Thompson	Llyn Hunter	September 4, 1999
Winnie tries to help out in a detective case, but searches into the case more on her own.
18c	18c	"Foiled in Oil"	Kurt Anderson	Ken Solomon & Jack Bornoff	Wendell Washer	September 4, 1999
Woody buys an oil dowser in order to find out where he can get oil to become rich. Wally also gets involved when Woody tells him about the Dowser and looses it as it chases an oil truck, so they both go after it.
19a	19a	"Aunt Pecky"	Alfred Gimeno	Hank Saroyan	Jill Colbert Trousdale	October 30, 1999
Woody wins a free pool, but does not want Ms. Meany to find out about the pool. He then dresses up as his aunt Pecky to drag Meany's mind away from the pool.
19b	19b	"Terror Tots"	Alfred Gimeno	Travis Clark	Tom Nelson	October 30, 1999
Knothead and Splinter decide to go into an abandoned house in order to record some ghosts. Two dog teens also follow them in order to scare them.
19c	19c	"Carney Con"	Alfred Gimeno	Nick DuBois	Lane Reichert	October 30, 1999
Woody, Knothead and Splinter go to a fair, but Buzz is there to cause trouble by cheating in his games that Woody plays.
20a	20a	"Bavariannoying"	Kurt Anderson	Travis Clark	Wendell Washer	November 6, 1999
Woody goes on a vacation in a castle in Bavaria, but soon finds out that he must entertain a kid in order to spend his vacation in the castle.
20b	20b	"Kitchen Magician"	Kurt Anderson	Robbie Thompson	Llyn Hunter	November 6, 1999
Winnie assists Wally in his cooking to help serve the royal queen. While Wally is making his special taffy, Winnie keeps causing trouble whenever trying to help out.
20c	20c	"Cheap Seats Woody"	Kurt Anderson	Robbie Thompson	Chrystal Klabunde	November 6, 1999
Woody buys cheap seats at a baseball game, but his tickets keep getting stolen by Dooley.
21a	21a	"Meany Side of the Street"	Alfred Gimeno	Mary Ann Gallo	Neal Sternecky	November 13, 1999
Ms. Meany wants to move because of Woody annoying her. Woody does not want her to move because of Wally wanting to buy the land and chop his tree-house down, so he follows her to a condo and ruins her experience.
21b	21b	"Chilly to Go"	Alfred Gimeno	Sean Roche	Tom Nelson	November 13, 1999
Chilly wants food and finds out Maxie is working on a plan to steal food, so he tries to get the food before Maxie can.
21c	21c	"Ant Rant"	Alfred Gimeno	Robbie Thompson	Jill Colbert Trousdale	November 13, 1999
A bunch of ants ruin Woody's picnic, so he keeps find ways to get rid of them from stealing his food.
22a	22a	"Woody Watcher"	Alfred Gimeno	Sean Roche	Jill Colbert Trousdale	November 20, 1999
Woody decides to pretend to be a rare spring-footed speckle-headed woodpecker that some bird-watchers want to see.
22b	22b	"Chilly Dog"	Alfred Gimeno	Sean Roche	Bob Onorato	November 20, 1999
Smedley tries to train a dog to be like him, while Chilly pretends to act like a dog.
22c	22c	"Beach Nuts"	Alfred Gimeno	Sean Roche	Tom Nelson	November 20, 1999
Woody decides to go to the beach to enjoy himself, but Ms. Meany is the watcher of the beach that he is on. Every action that Woody does makes her mad.
23a	23a	"A Very Woody Christmas"	Kurt Anderson	Robbie Thompson	Wendell Washer	December 25, 1999
Woody buys toys for Knothead and Splinter and decides to get them wrapped by Buzz and Tweaky, who end up scamming him with rocks. Woody then goes to get them back by dressing up as Santa, tricking Tweaky.
23b	23b	"It's a Chilly Christmas After All"	Kurt Anderson	Travis Clark	Chrystal Klabunde	December 25, 1999
Smedley thinks that he's Santa's number-one elf, so Chilly decides to mess with his plans.
23c	23c	"Yule Get Yours"	Kurt Anderson	Travis Clark	Llyn Hunter	December 25, 1999
Woody videotapes himself doing good deeds to get on Santa's nice list.

=== Season 2 (2000) ===
The first three episodes were produced during season 1's production cycle, but held over until 2000. From episode 27 to the end of the series, all episodes were directed by Alan Zaslove.

No. overall	No. in season	Title	Directed by	Written by	Storyboard by	Original release date
24a	1a	"Automatic Woody"	Kurt Anderson	Sean Roche	Wendell Washer	September 2, 2000
Woody gets a craving for his butterscotch candy. When he finds out that he is out, he goes out during the night to find more to satisfy his cravings.
24b	1b	"Zoom-a to Montezooma"	Alfred Gimeno & Mauro Casalese	Robbie Thompson & Richard Pursel	Chrystal Klabunde, Jim Smith & Kelly Armstrong	September 2, 2000
Smedly wants to capture Chilly in order to use him for a vacation.
24c	1c	"Chicken Woody"	Alfred Gimeno & Mauro Casalese	Robbie Thompson & Richard Pursel	Wendell Washer, Jim Smith & Chris Reccardi	September 2, 2000
Woody decides to become a chicken, but finds out that Meany is using the chickens in order to get money.
25a	2a	"Bonus Round Woody"	Kurt Anderson	Sean Roche	Chrystal Klabunde	September 9, 2000
Woody and Buzz enter a scavenger hunt in a junkyard. They both have to solve clues and find items in order to win.
25b	2b	"Winnie at the Ball"	Alfred Gimeno & Mauro Casalese	Diane A. Crea	Tom Nelson, Jeffery Gordon, Jim Smith & Bob Richardson	September 9, 2000
Winnie decides to take lessons from Wally in order to be proper at the high-society ball she wants to attend.
25c	2c	"Date with Destiny"	Kurt Anderson & Mauro Casalese	Travis Clark, Robbie Thompson & Jim Gomez	Llyn Hunter & Mike Fontinelli	September 9, 2000
Woody and Wally bet that one of them will be the first to get a date, but Woody ends up seeing Wally's advertisement.
26a	3a	"Woody's Roommate"	Alfred Gimeno & Mauro Casalese	Robbie Thompson & Bill Wray	Bob Onorato & Bill Wray	September 16, 2000
Buzz pretends that he is poor and without a home, causing Woody to fall in his trap to let him stay at his place.
26b	3b	"Winnie's New Car"	Alfred Gimeno & Mauro Casalese	Travis Clark & Sherri Schrader	Jill Colbert Trousdale, Jeffery Gordon & Eddie Fitzgerald	September 16, 2000
Winnie and Buzz tell the court their sides of the story about Winnie's car. Buzz then ends up using the judges car to exhibit, painting it red.
26c	3c	"Whistle Stop Woody"	Kurt Anderson	Sean Roche	Llyn Hunter	September 16, 2000
Woody takes a train trip when Winter approaches. Wally thinks of Woody as a freeloader when he only sends his luggage with him inside. Woody causes trouble in the train as Wally chases him.
27a	4a	"Stuck on You"	Alan Zaslove	Travis Clark	Funbag Animation Studios	September 23, 2000
Woody and Wally become stuck to one another when Woody accidentally sends Wally's glue flying, which Wally was using for Willy's gift.
27b	4b	"Freeze Dried Chilly"	Alan Zaslove	Sean Roche	Funbag Animation Studios	September 23, 2000
Smedly wants to find a way to freeze his fish, but Chilly tries to both steal his fish and help him.
27c	4c	"That Healing Feeling"	Alan Zaslove	Don Gillies	Funbag Animation Studios	September 23, 2000
Ms. Meany catches a cold, so Woody is forced to help her get better.
28a	5a	"Lap It Up"	Alan Zaslove	Robbie Thompson	Funbag Animation Studios	September 30, 2000
Woody becomes a racecar driver and competes against Dooley in the race.
28b	5b	"Swiss Family Buzzard"	Alan Zaslove	Sean Roche	Funbag Animation Studios	September 30, 2000
Buzz gets Knothead and Splinter into trouble when he takes them on a boat trip.
28c	5c	"Getting Comfortable"	Alan Zaslove	Charlie Cohen	Funbag Animation Studios	September 30, 2000
Woody tries to become comfortable on his couch, but a pesky feather keeps bothering him.
29a	6a	"Sync or Swim"	Alan Zaslove	Mark Hoffmeier	Funbag Animation Studios	October 7, 2000
Woody and Wally want to cool off, but find out they cannot go to the pool because it is closed for synchronized swimming. Ms. Meany then allows them to compete to see who will be on the team.
29b	6b	"Armed Chilly"	Alan Zaslove	Travis Clark	Funbag Animation Studios	October 7, 2000
Chilly decides to enter boot camp and somehow gets a promotion.
29c	6c	"Difficult Delivery"	Alan Zaslove	Don Gillies	Funbag Animation Studios	October 7, 2000
Woody wants to get free pizza from Dooley's pizza shop, so he keeps messing with Dooley in delivering his order.
30a	7a	"Cabin Fever"	Alan Zaslove	Robbie Thompson	Funbag Animation Studios	October 14, 2000
A snowstorm pops out of nowhere, and now Woody is stuck at Wally's home until the snow melts.
30b	7b	"Everybody's a Critic"	Alan Zaslove	Robbie Thompson	Funbag Animation Studios	October 14, 2000
Winnie opens up a restaurant and wants to please the critic, but she thinks that Wally is the critic and not Ms. Meany.
30c	7c	"Hide and Seek"	Alan Zaslove	Michael Merton	Funbag Animation Studios	October 14, 2000
Woody has a hatred against a bear who stole his car and wants to be kept safe from any trouble before trial. The badger, however, is behind the prisoner and has been hired to assassinate Woody.
31a	8a	"The Ice Rage"	Alan Zaslove	Travis Clark	Funbag Animation Studios	October 21, 2000
Woody wants to cool off in Wally's Fruit Market, but Wally only allows paying customers in his store.
31b	8b	"Endangered Chilly"	Alan Zaslove	Robbie Thompson	Funbag Animation Studios	October 21, 2000
Smedly is trying to help a polar bear, but Chilly wants to be in the bonding as well.
31c	8c	"Attila the Hen"	Alan Zaslove	Travis Clark	Funbag Animation Studios	October 21, 2000
Woody tries to get Attila the Hen's eggs when Woody spots a sign for free eggs, not knowing how hard it can be.
32a	9a	"Frankenwoody"	Alan Zaslove	David Ehrman	Funbag Animation Studios	October 28, 2000
Wally gets jealous of how Woody receives all the attention, so Wally switches bodies with Woody to steal his girl.
32b	9b	"The Meany Witch Project"	Alan Zaslove	Richard Merwin	Funbag Animation Studios	October 28, 2000
Splinter and Knothead think Ms. Meany is a witch and that they will soon be woodpecker stew.
32c	9c	"Fright Movie Woody"	Alan Zaslove	Sean Roche	Funbag Animation Studios	October 28, 2000
Woody tries to dodge Meany at the movie theater where she is taking her new job a bit too seriously.
33a	10a	"This Seat's Taken"	Alan Zaslove	Marlowe Weisman	Funbag Animation Studios	November 4, 2000
Woody becomes a seat taker at a banquet awards ceremony, but finds out that the seat he took was Wally's. Since Wally does not have his ticket, he cannot prove that it is his seat.
33b	10b	"Cajun Chilly"	Alan Zaslove	Travis Clark	Funbag Animation Studios	November 4, 2000
Chilly must escape chef Rufus le Dufus before he is made into gumbo pie.
33c	10c	"Out of Line"	Alan Zaslove	Travis Clark	Funbag Animation Studios	November 4, 2000
An unruly Dooley will do anything to get in line before Woody for the latest spy movie.
34a	11a	"Inn Trouble"	Alan Zaslove	Robbie Thompson	Funbag Animation Studios	November 11, 2000
In order to save Wally's Inn from being bought out, Woody and Wally team up to annoy the customers.
34b	11b	"Wishful Thinking"	Alan Zaslove	Travis Clark	Funbag Animation Studios	November 11, 2000
Splinter and Knothead make a wish on their birthday, but Tweaky gives them an unsatisfactory wish. They then try to stop Tweaky from getting his free vacation.
34c	11c	"Trail Ride Woody"	Alan Zaslove	Robbie Thompson	Funbag Animation Studios	November 11, 2000
Woody bets a cowboy five dollars that he can break in a stubborn old mule.
35a	12a	"Super Woody"	Alan Zaslove	Robbie Thompson	Funbag Animation Studios	November 18, 2000
A bolt of lightning gives Woody and Buzz super powers.
35b	12b	"Skating By"	Alan Zaslove	Robbie Thompson	Funbag Animation Studios	November 18, 2000
Winnie gets a job as a carhop at a Tex-Mex restaurant, but Mrs. Meany is tasked by her manager to train her. Mrs. Meany, however, plans to make Winnie's job very stressful. When Winnie wins over the restaurant's customers, Mrs. Meany plans to get rid of her out of jealousy.
35c	12c	"Be a Sport"	Alan Zaslove	Travis Clark	Funbag Animation Studios	November 18, 2000
Woody's desire for free athletic equipment lands him a stressful coaching job for the destructive Gunther.
36a	13a	"Like Father, Unlike Son"	Alan Zaslove	Len Janson	Funbag Animation Studios	November 25, 2000
Woody goes off the deep end when he agrees to pose as Wally's father in exchange for a free cruise, but a literal mole is spying on them to make sure they are father and son, or else they will be thrown in the brig.
36b	13b	"A Chilly Spy"	Alan Zaslove	Sean Roche	Funbag Animation Studios	November 25, 2000
Sergeant Hogwash is charged with training the ever-disappearing Chilly to be a super spy.
36c	13c	"Country Fair Clam-ity"	Alan Zaslove	Mark Zaslove	Funbag Animation Studios	November 25, 2000
Woody wants to enter the country fair's "Anything Goes" race, but a nasty clam who loves to eat does not want to race with him.
37a	14a	"Eenie, Meany, Out You Go!"	Alan Zaslove	Earl Kress	Funbag Animation Studios	December 2, 2000
A high-society fake weasels his way into Ms. Meany's heart and Woody's treehouse.
37b	14b	"Stage Fright"	Alan Zaslove	Sean Roche	Funbag Animation Studios	December 2, 2000
When Buzz and Tweaky are sentenced to put on a play, they trick Splinter and Knothead into becoming actors for their play.
37c	14c	"Gone Fishin'"	Alan Zaslove	Sean Roche	Funbag Animation Studios	December 2, 2000
Woody and Lefty team up to reel in some gullible fisherman.
38a	15a	"Teacher's Pet"	Alan Zaslove	Sean Roche	Funbag Animation Studios	December 9, 2000
Woody is forced to go to woodpecker school by Mother Nature.
38b	15b	"Dirty Derby"	Alan Zaslove	Travis Clark	Funbag Animation Studios	December 9, 2000
Wally plays dirty in the neighborhood Soap Box Power Derby.
38c	15c	"Hooray for Holly-Woody"	Alan Zaslove	Sean Roche	Funbag Animation Studios	December 9, 2000
Woody receives the star treatment on a visit to Tinseltown.
39a	16a	"Cyrano de Woodypecker"	Alan Zaslove	Julie Prendiville Roux & Christine Coyle	Funbag Animation Studios	December 16, 2000
Woody coaches Wally through Ms. Meany's love potion-induced advances.
39b	16b	"Chilly Lilly"	Alan Zaslove	Sean Roche	Funbag Animation Studios	December 16, 2000
Smedley attempts to find Chilly a soul mate through his online dating service.
39c	16c	"Meany's Date Bait"	Alan Zaslove	Robbie Thompson	Funbag Animation Studios	December 16, 2000
To make an old boyfriend jealous, Ms. Meany forces Woody to be her date at the high school reunion.
40	17	"The Twelve Lies of Christmas"	Alan Zaslove	Sean Roche	Funbag Animation Studios	December 23, 2000
While Splinter and Knothead set up for a live webcast of Santa's arrival, Woody, Wally and Meany fight over who saved Christmas the year Santa was kidnapped by Buzz and Tweaky.

=== Season 3 (2002) ===
Every episode from this season went unaired on the main Fox Kids network, instead making their worldwide debut on the Canadian children's channel YTV.

No. overall	No. in season	Title	Written by	Storyboard by	Original release date
41a	1a	"Woodsy Woody"	Bill Burnett	Andy Bartlett, Jeff Barker & Marlon Deane	May 4, 2002
Woody and some pals go camping and find themselves at the mercy of Wally's ridiculous campground rules.
41b	1b	"Chilly Solar Wars"	David Ehrman	Andy Bartlett, Jeff Barker & Marlon Deane	May 4, 2002
Hogwash becomes heated when Chilly interferes with his plans to spruce up his hot tub and sauna.
41c	1c	"Cue the Pool Shark"	Don Gillies	Andy Bartlett, Jeff Barker & Marlon Deane	May 4, 2002
Buzz and Tweaky are backed into a corner when Woody busts them for cheating at pool.
42a	2a	"Couples Therapy"	Chuck Tately	Glen Lovett, Louie Escauriaga, Marlon Deane & Karen Lloyd	May 11, 2002
A judge sentences Woody and Ms. Meany to therapy sessions to stop their squabbles.
42b	2b	"Chilly Blue Yonder"	Frank Santo Padre	Glen Lovett, Louie Escauriaga, Marlon Deane & Karen Lloyd	May 11, 2002
Smedley's anger is blown sky-high when he discovers Chilly is a stowaway on his plane.
42c	2c	"Hiccup-Ed"	Eric Vesbit & Christine Abad	Glen Lovett, Louie Escauriaga, Marlon Deane & Karen Lloyd	May 11, 2002
Much to Wally's dismay, Woody helps stop his record-setting hiccups.
43a	3a	"Crouching Meany, Hidden Woodpecker"	Steve Bransfield	Jeff Barker, Karen Lloyd & Andy Bartlett	May 18, 2002
If Woody helps Ms. Meany with her karate test, she will give him free rent for a year.
43b	3b	"A Chilly Party Crasher"	Frank Santo Padre	Jeff Barker, Karen Lloyd & Andy Bartlett	May 18, 2002
Chilly realizes he is a lone guest when he crashes Bear's party of the year.
43c	3c	"Junk Funk"	Reed Shelly	Jeff Barker, Karen Lloyd & Andy Bartlett	May 18, 2002
Woody must battle wits with a junkyard dog to get back his Russian satellite.
44a	4a	"Two Woodys, No Waiting"	Bill Burnett	Karen Lloyd, Jason Horychun & Rob Boutilier	May 25, 2002
It is double trouble when Woody clones himself.
44b	4b	"A Chilly Amusement Park"	David Ehrman	Karen Lloyd, Jason Horychun & Rob Boutilier	May 25, 2002
Chilly is cold towards Smedley who is trying to con him out of his land.
44c	4c	"Born to Be Woody"	Steve Bransfield	Karen Lloyd, Jason Horychun & Rob Boutilier	May 25, 2002
Woody, Wally, and Meany remininsce about their hippie days at the commune.
45a	5a	"Mechanical Meany"	Travis Clark	Andy Bartlett, Louie Escauriaga & Jeff Barker	June 1, 2002
Because Ms. Meany is being so nice, Woody and Wally are convinced she is a robot.
45b	5b	"A Chilly Furnace"	Chuck Tately	Andy Bartlett, Louie Escauriaga & Jeff Barker	June 1, 2002
Sergeant Hogwash gets fired up when Chilly steals his furnace fuel.
45c	5c	"Homerun Woody"	David Ehrman	Andy Bartlett, Louie Escauriaga & Jeff Barker	June 1, 2002
Buzz and Tweaky give Woody the run-around with their baseball camp scam.
46a	6a	"Tire Tyrant"	Travis Clark	Rob Boutilier, Marlon Deane & Jeff Barker	June 8, 2002
Woody encounters a playful primate who will not return the tire from his car.
46b	6b	"A Chilly B-B-Q"	Kelly Ward	Rob Boutilier, Marlon Deane & Jeff Barker	June 8, 2002
Chilly makes Hogwash look inferior when he attempts to barbecue for his superior.
46c	6c	"Spring Cleaning"	Charlie Cohen	Rob Boutilier, Marlon Deane & Jeff Barker	June 8, 2002
Woody sports with Ms. Meany when she makes him clean the house.
47a	7a	"The Fabulous Foodbox by Scamco"	Adam Kosloff & Alex Funk	Jeff Barker	June 15, 2002
Woody's hunger causes him to fall for Buzz and Tweaky's culinary con.
47b	7b	"A Chilly Hockey Star"	Frank Santo Padre	Jeff Barker	June 15, 2002
Smedley hunts for the newest hockey sensation and Chilly could be it.
47c	7c	"Corn Fed Up"	Travis Clark	Jeff Barker	June 15, 2002
Woody is swamped with the wrong information from Gabby Gator.
48a	8a	"Infrequent Flyer"	Chris Tsougas	Karen Lloyd, Marlon Deane & Jason Horychun	June 22, 2002
Love is in the air when Woody and Wally are both smitten with the same flight attendant.
48b	8b	"A Chilly Cold & Flu Season"	Jeff Nimoy & Bob Buchholz	Karen Lloyd, Marlon Deane & Jason Horychun	June 22, 2002
Hogwash is sick to death of Chilly.
48c	8c	"Moto-Double Cross"	Earl Kress	Karen Lloyd, Marlon Deane & Jason Horychun	June 22, 2002
Buzz and Tweaky try to run Woody into the ground in a moto-cross competition.
49a	9a	"Wild Woodpecker"	Reed Shelly	Andy Bartlett & Karen Lloyd	June 29, 2002
Woody thinks it is cool when he finds a million-year-old cave-woodpecker frozen in ice.
49b	9b	"A Chilly Fashion Model"	Chuck Tately	Andy Bartlett & Karen Lloyd	June 29, 2002
When a fashion model arrives in Antarctica, Chilly really cramps her style.
49c	9c	"Speed Demon Mountain"	Robbie Thompson	Andy Bartlett & Karen Lloyd	June 29, 2002
When Woody, Knothead and Splinter hit the amusement park, a safety-conscious Wally takes the thrill out of their rides.
50a	10a	"Niece and Quiet"	Travis Clark	Jeff Barker & Russ Crispin	July 6, 2002
Woody wants to nap in peace, but Ms. Meany makes him babysit her niece.
50b	10b	"Chilly Bananas"	Kelly Ward	Jeff Barker & Russ Crispin	July 6, 2002
Chilly pollutes Hogwash's vacation in the biodome.
50c	10c	"Surf Crazy"	Kelly Ward	Jeff Barker & Russ Crispin	July 6, 2002
Buzz and Tweaky's plan to win the big water race sinks when they try to cheat against Woody and Winnie.
51a	11a	"Birdhounded"	Glenn Leopold	Rob Boutilier, Marlon Deane & Gerry Capelle	July 13, 2002
Buzz gets a bird-brained idea to sell Woody to a scientist.
51b	11b	"Run Chilly, Run Deep"	Frank Santo Padre	Rob Boutilier, Marlon Deane & Gerry Capelle	July 13, 2002
Chilly is in deep trouble when he disrupts Smedley's undersea treasure hunt.
51c	11c	"Surviving Woody"	Robbie Thompson	Rob Boutilier, Marlon Deane & Gerry Capelle	July 13, 2002
Woody and Ms. Meany must survive the game show "Extreme Island".
52a	12a	"Firehouse Woody"	Peter Sheridan	Keith Ingham, Karen Lloyd & Jeff Barker	July 20, 2002
Woody gets fired up for some heated competition with a fireman trainee, who is very overconfident.
52b	12b	"Hogwash Junior"	Sean Roche	Keith Ingham, Karen Lloyd & Jeff Barker	July 20, 2002
Chilly torments Hogwash's nephew while he trains for the Antarctic Corp.
52c	12c	"Thrash for Cash"	Sean Roche	Keith Ingham, Karen Lloyd & Jeff Barker	July 20, 2002
Splinter and Knothead skateboard their way to stardom with Woody as their coach.
53a	13a	"Miniature Golf Mayhem"	Cade Chilcoat	Keith Ingham, Russ Crispin & Rob Boutilier	July 27, 2002
Buzz and Tweaky are no match for Woody when it comes to their golf con.
53b	13b	"A Chilly Cliffhanger"	Frank Santo Padre	Keith Ingham, Russ Crispin & Rob Boutilier	July 27, 2002
Smedley gets snowed by Chilly in a mountain climbing expedition.
53c	13c	"I Know What You Did Last Night"	Sean Roche	Keith Ingham, Russ Crispin & Rob Boutilier	July 27, 2002
To be on TV, Woody and Winnie spend the night in a haunted castle.

== Broadcast ==
The New Woody Woodpecker Show aired on Fox Kids from May 8, 1999, through December 23, 2000. The show also aired on YTV in Canada and Cartoon Network in Australia and Latin America. It also aired on CBBC and later on CITV in the UK.

== Home media ==
Three DVDs were released in region 2, which were previously released on VHS. 20 DVDs containing episodes from the Latin Spanish dub of the show was also released throughout mid-to-late 2005. As of February 2018, the first 13 episodes can be viewed on Hulu and Yahoo! View. Previously, all 53 episodes were available for streaming on Netflix and the full series had been part of the NBCUniversal streaming service on Peacock, from its launch on July 15, 2020 to 2024, in high-definition (albeit with some of the intro cut off for Episode 7, older captions for season 3 than seasons 1 and 2, and the first three episodes of season 2 thrown into the season 1 order on Peacock). The show was added to Tubi in 2026. The entire series is also available on YouTube.
