= Homer Brightman =

American screenwriter

- Born: October 1, 1901
- Died: January 31, 1988 (aged 86); Albuquerque, New Mexico
- Occupation: Screenwriter
- Writing career
- Notable works: Cinderella (1950), Bozo: The World's Most Famous Clown (1958–1962) and The Three Caballeros (1944)
- Website: IMDB

Homer Brightman (October 1, 1901 – January 31, 1988) was an American screenwriter who worked for Walt Disney Productions, Walter Lantz Productions, Metro-Goldwyn-Mayer cartoon department, UPA, Larry Harmon Pictures, Cambria Productions and DePatie–Freleng Enterprises.

Brightman was also the original gag writer for Al Taliaferro's Donald Duck newspaper comic strip from 1938 to 1940, before Bob Karp took over.

== Filmography ==
Homer Brightman worked as a writer except as noted.

- Saludos Amigos (Lake Titicaca segment) (1942)
- The Three Caballeros (1944)
- Old Sequoia (1945)
- Make Mine Music (Casey at the Bat segment) (1946)
- Dumb Bell of the Yukon (1946)
- Fun and Fancy Free (Mickey and the Beanstalk segment) (1947)
- Melody Time (1948)
- The Adventures of Ichabod and Mr. Toad (The Wind in the Willows segment) (1949)
- Cinderella (1950)
- The Great Who-Dood-It (1952)
- Buccaneer Woodpecker (1953)
- Operation Sawdust (1953)
- Maw and Paw (1953)
- Hypnotic Hick (1953)
- Belle Boys (1953)
- Hot Noon (or 12 O'Clock for Sure) (1953)
- Socko in Morocco (1954)
- Alley to Bali (1954)
- Under the Counter Spy (1954)
- Hot Rod Huckster (1954)
- Piggy's Dizzy Night (1954)
- A Fine Feathered Frenzy (1954)
- I'm Cold (1954)
- Witch Crafty (1955)
- Private Eye Pooch (1955)
- Bedtime Bedlam (1955)
- The Tree Medic (1955)
- Pigeon Holed (1956)
- The Ostrich Egg and I (1956)
- Room and Wrath (1956)
- Woodpecker from Mars (1956)
- Hold That Rock (1956)
- The Talking Dog (1956)
- Woody Meets Davy Crewcut (1956)
- Arts and Flowers (1956)
- Operation Cold Feet (1956)
- Give and Tyke (1957)
- Box Car Bandit (1957)
- Scat Cats (1957)
- To Catch a Woodpecker (1957)
- The Big Snooze (1957)
- Fowled-Up Party (1957)
- Fodder and Son (1957)
- Dopey Dick the Pink Whale (1957)
- Swiss Miss-Fit (1957)
- One Droopy Knight (1957)
- Misguided Missile (1958)
- Sheep Wrecked (1958)
- Watch the Birdie (1958)
- Salmon Yeggs (1958)
- Mutts About Racing (1958)
- His Better Elf (1958)
- Droopy Leprechaun (1958)
- Everglade Raid (1958)
- Tot Watchers (1958)
- A Chilly Reception (1958)
- Tree's a Crowd (1958)
- Three-Ring Fling (1958)
- Jittery Jester (1958)
- Little Televillain (1958)
- Witty Kitty (1959)
- Truant Student (1959)
- Robinson Gruesome (1959)
- Tomcat Combat (1959)
- Yukon Have It (1959)
- Log Jammed (1959)
- Bee Bopped (1959)
- The Tee Bird (1959)
- Romp in a Swamp (1959)
- Mouse Trapped (1959)
- Ballyhooey (1960)
- Billion Dollar Boner (1960)
- Bats in the Belfry (1960)
- Fish Hooked (1960)
- Fowled Up Falcon (1960)
- The Dick Tracy Show (TV series) (26 episodes) (1961)
- Poop Deck Pirate (1961)
- Rough and Tumble-Weed (1961)
- The Bird Who Came to Dinner (1961)
- Gabby's Diner (1961)
- Clash and Carry (1961)
- St. Moritz Blitz (1961)
- Franken-Stymied (1961)
- Mississippi Slow Boat (1961)
- Bozo: The World's Most Famous Clown (TV series) (52 episodes) (1962)
- Dumb Like a Fox (1964)
- Deep Freeze Squeeze (1964)
- Skin Folks (1964)
- Lighthouse-keeping Blues (1964)
- The New 3 Stooges (TV series) (1965)
- Sioux Me (1965)
- Pesty Guest (1965)
- Operation Shanghai (1966)
- Snow Place Like Home (1966)
- South Pole Pals (1966)
- Teeny Weeny Meany (1966)
- The Super 6 (TV series) (1 episode) (1966)
- Chilly Chums (1967)
- Chiller Dillers (1967)
- Highway Hecklers (1968)
- Project Reject (1969)
- Tumble Weed Greed (1969)
- Chilly and the Looney Gooney (1969)
- Ship a-Hoy Woody (1969)
- Prehistoric Super Salesman (1969)
- Sleepy Time Bear (1969)
- Little Skeeter (1969)
