= Chilly Willy =

Fictional character

- Woody Woodpecker character
- First appearance: Chilly Willy (1953)
- Created by: Paul J. Smith (original); Tex Avery (redesign)
- Designed by: Tex Avery
- Voiced by: Sara Berner (1953); Grace Stafford (1954, 1957, 1963); Nancy Wible (1955) (singing voice in Hot and Cold Penguin opening); Bonnie Baker (1956, 1961) (singing voice in the openings); Gloria Wood (1957); Daws Butler (1964–1972); Brad Norman (2018); Dee Bradley Baker (2020–present)
- Spinoffs: Appearances
- Years active: 1953–present

In-universe information
- Species: Penguin
- Gender: Male
- Significant other: Chilly Lilly

Chilly Willy is a cartoon character created by Paul Smith for Walter Lantz Productions in 1953. He was developed further by Tex Avery in the two subsequent films following Smith's debut entry. He is a diminutive penguin who constantly seeks warmth and shelter without regard of others' safety. Avery's redesign allowed the titular series released by Universal to become the second most popular Walter Lantz character behind Woody Woodpecker. Fifty Chilly Willy cartoons were produced between 1953 and 1972.

== Characteristics ==
Chilly Willy was inspired by mystery writer Stuart Palmer, according to Scott MacGillivray's book Castle Films: A Hobbyist's Guide. Palmer used the Lantz studio as a background for his novel Cold Poison, in which the cartoon star was a penguin character, and Lantz adopted the penguin idea for the screen. The character Pablo the Penguin from the 1945 Disney film The Three Caballeros was the inspiration for Chilly Willy. Paul J. Smith initially based Chilly's design on a generic penguin character from Lantz' 1945 cartoon Sliphorn King of Polaroo. Tex Avery gave the character a distinct appearance in his second cartoon, I'm Cold in 1954.

Chilly Willy appeared in 50 theatrical short subjects produced by Lantz from 1953 to 1972, most of which involve his attempts to stay warm or get food, and often meeting opposition from a dog named Smedly (voiced by Daws Butler). Smedly has a large mouth and sharp-pointed teeth (which he shows off when yawning), but is never shown viciously trying to bite Chilly or anyone else with them. There were times, however, when Chilly and Smedley got along, as they did in Vicious Viking and Fractured Friendship, but Chilly never referred to Smedley by name. Most times that Chilly was in opposition with Smedley, it wound up with the two of them being friends at the end. Chilly was more of a nuisance to Smedley than an enemy, often appearing where he is working, usually for some mean employer.

Two of Chilly's friends in the later cartoons were Maxie the Polar Bear (voiced by Daws Butler) and Gooney the "Gooney Bird" Albatross (voiced by Daws Butler impersonating Joe E. Brown). Maxie has appeared with Chilly more than Gooney has. There have been only two cartoons in which all three characters have appeared together: Gooney's Goofy Landings (where Chilly and Maxie try to perfect Gooney's landings) and Airlift a la Carte (where Chilly, Maxie, and Gooney go to the store owned by Smedley).

In some episodes, Chilly Willy also deals with a hunter named Colonel Pot Shot (voiced by Daws Butler) whom Smedley has been shown to work for in some episodes. Pot Shot would give orders in a calm controlled voice, and then would explode in rage when he told Smedley what would happen should he fail in his objective. Also, two episodes had Chilly Willy outsmarting Wally Walrus when Chilly Willy comes across his fishing projects.

Paul Smith directed the first Chilly Willy cartoon, simply titled Chilly Willy, in 1953. The initial version of Chilly Willy resembled a realistic penguin without many unique characteristics. Tex Avery revived the character for two of his shorts, I'm Cold (1954) and the Academy Award nominated The Legend of Rockabye Point (1955). After Avery left the studio, Alex Lovy assumed as director, starting by directing Hot and Cold Penguin.

Chilly was mute in most of his 1950s cartoons and early 1960s cartoons, although he was voiced by Sara Berner in the initial entry. The next time he spoke was in The Woody Woodpecker Show Halloween special Spook-A-Nanny in 1964, with Daws Butler providing Chilly's voice until the end of the series in a style similar to his Elroy Jetson characterization from The Jetsons. The character always speaks in the comic book stories based on the character. Also in the comic book stories, Chilly had two nephews named Ping and Pong, similar to how Woody Woodpecker is uncle to twins Knothead and Splinter.

When the Lantz cartoons were packaged for television in 1957 as The Woody Woodpecker Show, Chilly Willy was a featured attraction on the show, and has remained such in all later versions of the Woody Woodpecker Show package.

== Other appearances ==
In the 1988 film Who Framed Roger Rabbit, Chilly Willy is mentioned by Eddie's acquaintance Angelo.

Chilly Willy is featured in The New Woody Woodpecker Show where he has no dialogue. Like the shorts, Chilly has gone up against Smedley. Later episodes introduce Sgt. Hogwash (voiced by Blake Clark) and Major Bull (voiced by Kevin Michael Richardson) who operate in an Antarctic military base that Chilly tends to trespass in. The Legend of Rockabye Point was also featured early on, dubbed "A Classic Chilly Cartoon".

Chilly Willy is a supporting character in the 2018 Woody Woodpecker animated series, voiced by Brad Norman and Dee Bradley Baker.

Chilly Willy makes a cameo appearance in the 2024 film Woody Woodpecker Goes to Camp as a wood sculpture that Woody makes.

== See also ==
- Walter Lantz Productions
- List of Walter Lantz cartoon characters
- Freezie
