= Ace in the Hole (1942 film) =

1942 film

- Title card
- Directed by: Alex Lovy
- Story by: Ben Hardaway; Milt Schaffer
- Produced by: Walter Lantz
- Starring: Kent Rogers
- Music by: Darrell Calker
- Animation by: George Dane; Alex Lovy; Laverne Harding
- Color process: Technicolor
- Production company: Walter Lantz Productions
- Distributed by: Universal Pictures
- Release date: June 22, 1942
- Running time: 6:43
- Country: United States
- Language: English

Ace in the Hole is the fifth animated cartoon short subject in the Woody Woodpecker series. Produced by Walter Lantz Productions and distributed by Universal Pictures, the short was released theatrically on June 22, 1942. Like many other animation and film studios in the 1940s, Walter Lantz Productions through its iconic character, Woody Woodpecker, became part of the war effort.

== Plot ==
Woody Woodpecker is at an U.S. Army Air Corps military air base, and is dreaming of taking one of the aircraft up in the air. His enthusiasm in this respect gets him into a lot of trouble with his sergeant, who, fed up with Woody's actions in trying to imitate a pilot, throws Woody out of the barracks and into the pilots' quarters. Woody reads a textbook ("How to Fly a Plane From the Ground Up"). In the quarters, he stumbles over a clothes tree and into a flying suit. Woody's attempts to zipper the suit get him into more trouble as he knocks over a box of flares, one of which lands in the collar of the flying suit.

Attempting to zipper the suit, Woody mistakenly pulls the pin from the flare, and he is violently projected into the air. The suit swells up and bursts, and Woody floats down by parachute into the cockpit of the aircraft (the PU-2). The sergeant orders Woody out of the cockpit, but Woody blindly pulls on a lever, and the aircraft takes off so fast that it leaves all the paint including markings and insignia behind.

Finally, the sergeant lassos the aircraft, and the jolt yanks him out of his uniform. He climbs up to the cockpit through a bottom hatch, and as Woody opens it, bombs fall into the sergeant's union suit underwear. The result is disastrous for the sergeant. Ultimately, the sergeant, sitting bandaged in a wheelchair with a shotgun on his knee, has an unharmed yet upset Woody clipping every horse in the Army.

== Cast ==
- Kent Rogers as Woody Woodpecker, GI Sergeant (uncredited)

== Production notes ==
Ace in the Hole (production #1014) was a World War II era animated short. Some erasure of the penciled title on a production drawing in graphite reveals that at some point the original title for this was "America's Ace In The Hole".

Woody's original design became a little softer in starting with Ace in the Hole. His bucked teeth began to disappear, as Lantz realized this feature was extraneous. In addition, the beak and feet colors became slightly brighter and more vibrant, and his big chin is gone.

A number of 1940s aviation and aeronautics terms were used in Ace in the Hole. The title is a play on the card-playing term "ace in the hole" and the "flying ace" who would score five victories in a fighter aircraft. The "clipper" was a reference to the famous Boeing Clipper that had recently gone into service with Pan American World Airways. Even the fictional "PU-2" bore a striking resemblance to the Curtiss P-40 Warhawk fighter aircraft in service with the United States Army Air Corps.

== Reception ==
Ace in the Hole was the fifth episode of Season 1 of The Woody Woodpecker Show, a "package show" that debuted on ABC on October 3, 1957. The series continued until 1958 on ABC, 1958–1966 in Syndication, 1970-September 2, 1972 on NBC, September 11, 1976 – September 3, 1977 on NBC, 1987–1997 in syndication, and 1997–1998 on Cartoon Network, where it disappeared from television entirely (save for the re-runs on Canada's Teletoon Retro service and MeTV).

=== Controversy ===
In the 1950s, Ace in the Hole became the vocal issue in the controversy that surrounds violence and violent images in the media. The wartime cartoon "became the subject of a famous study on the effects of media violence on children. It would be the first of many, launching a powerful movement".

The Walter Lantz cartoon was the subject of a scientific study conducted by researcher Dr. Roberta Siegel: "As the stimulus from which the children's behavior was subsequently tested, it is regarded as the Experiment ("the E film") and the musical Iwerks' Comicolor cartoon The Little Red Hen (sp) is the Control ("the C film")". The study, completed in early 1955 by Siegel, was published the next year with the title "Film-Mediated Fantasy Aggression and Strength of Aggressive Drive".

Ace in the Hole was characterized as an example of extreme cartoon violence. Siegel wrote that "raw aggression and unrelenting hostility dominate almost every scene of this, the E film". The children in the study were given the choice of toys to play with including benign objects such as a clay, but also, two rubber knives. The choice of the "violent" toy was linked to watching violent images and started a decades-long controversy of the effects of violent images on children's behavior.
