= Joe Bevilacqua =

American radio host, producer, and director (born 1959)

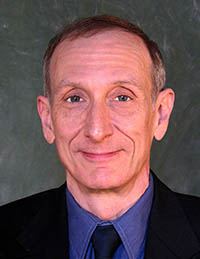
- Bevilacqua in 2013
- Born: Joseph Salvatore Bevilacqua Jr. January 2, 1959 (age 67); Newark, New Jersey, U.S.
- Other names: Joe Bev; Joseph K. Bevilacqua
- Occupations: Radio host, producer, and director; dramatist; humorist; cartoonist; author; actor
- Years active: 1982–present

Joseph Salvatore Bevilacqua Jr., also known as Joe Bev (born January 2, 1959 in Newark), is an American radio host, producer and director, dramatist, and humorist best known for his radio theatre. He has worked for a variety of radio stations, including WBAI, NPR, and WHJY and started his own production company, Waterlogg Productions. He has also written several scripts, stories, and books with his mentor Daws Butler. In addition to his comedy work, Bevilacqua has appeared in several films in bit roles or as an extra, and in television series, primarily as historical figures.

== Early life and education ==
Bevilacqua was born on January 2, 1959, in Newark, New Jersey, the son of Joseph Bevilacqua Sr., a policeman whose family had roots in Apulia, Italy, and Joan Kvidahl. Bevilacqua had a sister, Caryn, and they were raised in Iselin, New Jersey. Bevilacqua began performing as a child; in 1971, his father bought him a tape recorder, which he used to record his first audio stories, Willoughby and the Professor. He performed all of the voices himself, creating live sound effects, and scoring with 78 RPM records he found in his attic. At age 15, he sent a letter to Daws Butler, asking him for advice on becoming a voice actor and sending "Hanna-Barbera style drawings" of the characters from Willoughby and the Professor. Butler responded, discouraging him from pursuing entertainment, but Bevilacqua persisted until Butler requested he send a tape of his work. He sent four 30-minute episodes of Willoughby and the Professor, to which Butler responded by declaring himself Bevilacqua's mentor and sending a cassette of voice acting guidance and advice.

As a teenager, Bevilacqua and his childhood friend Gary Bihler started performing the Abbott and Costello routine Who's on First? in front of audiences. In 1976, the duo appeared on Joe Franklin's show on WWOR-TV. Bevilacqua attended St. Thomas Aquinas High School and Middlesex County College (1977-1980), participating in theatre at both. At Middlesex, he formed the comedy troupe Liquid Comedy. He then transferred to Kean College, where he produced radio dramas weekly for the student radio station, WKNJ-FM, in addition to participating in theatre. While there, he produced a four-hour audio version of Hamlet, which was later picked up by National Federation of Community Broadcasters for national syndicate. His work on WKNJ helped him get a job at WBAI after graduating.

== Career ==
Bevilacqua worked for WBAI for several years and started producing and directing radio plays. These included The Bear, A Freneau Sampler (collection of Philip Freneau's poetry, prose and life), and Daws Butler's A Halloween Happening. Since then, Bevilacqua has worked a number of stations, often simultaneously, including WBGO, Jazz 88, WDZR NPR, KUT, PRI, WNYC, New York Public Radio, WHJY, WWDC, and Sirius XM Radio. In addition to radio theatre, he also produced audio documentaries on subjects including Louis Armstrong and the making of the War of the World broadcast. In 2002, he was promoted to Regional VP/Programming for the Eastern North East area for WHJY, while still working as Rock Brand Manager and program director for the station. In 2005, he became Clear Channel Denver's Regional VP/Programming. He appeared as a guest in episodes of shows including Marketplace, Day to Day, Weekend Edition, and All Things Considered. In the early 2000s, he started a project for NPR that became an essay entitled "A Guy Named Joe Bevilacqua," wherein he called 43 people with the same name and interviewed them.

In 1990, he turned his childhood sketches into the radio show Willoughby and the Professor, which were aired as 30-minute episodes. The same year, Pacific Program Service started airing an anthology called Usually Whimsical: The Joe Bevilacqua Radio Theatre Collection, which included 43 half-hour "original comedies and dramas, continuing series and adaptations of classics." It first played on WNYC, then was broadcast on WBAI starting in 1993. The collection was showcased at the Museum of Television and Radio in 1992. By 1993, Bevilacqua was hosting, directing, producing, and writing a number of shows, including Willoughby and the Professor, The Mis-Adventures of Sherlock Holmes, Old Time Radio Parodies, Scenes from the Daws Butler Workshop, Classics: Old and New, and Radio Theatre. The Sherlock Holmes ten-part series was written in the 1980s with Daws Butler and reimagined the classic tale as a sleuthing Dr. Watson and a bumbling Holmes. The show also aired in Australia in 2000.

By 2014, his lineup had changed but was still active; his production company, Waterlogg Productions, claimed that he had 14 regularly airing radio series, and 34 hours of new radio per month. The Joe Bev Hour was the umbrella name used by radio stations to encompass all of Bevilacqua's shows. Stations running the show included WGTD, WHRO, and Radio New Zealand. In 2013, The Joe Bev 3-Hour Block was streaming on Cult Radio A-Go-Go. The Comedy-O-Rama Hour and The Joe Bev Audio Theater were both improv shows starring Bevilacqua, his wife Lorie, and special guests including Bob Edwards, Al Franken, Rick Overton, Judy Tenuta, and Bob Camp. Jazz-O-Rama was a music show during which Bevilacqua played remastered 78 RPM records and early LPs from his own collection. The Joe Bev Experience was a mix of interviews, comedy, and music. Cartoon Carnival was a show about "the golden age of TV animation," from the 1950s to the 1970s. The Joe Bev Hour Sunday Edition was a rotating lineup of Bevilacqua's other shows.

In March 2014, BearManor Media appointed Bevilacqua as program director of the new Bear Manor Radio Network. In June, he was producing shows including The Voice Actor Show, wherein he interviewed guests including Janet Waldo, David Ossman, Phil Proctor, and June Foray; Lorie's Book Nook, featuring interviews with Bear Manor authors; The J-OTR Show and The Lost OTR Show, an hour of "mash-ups of old and new time radio"; Fred Frees Favorites, an audio book sampler; Audio Classics Archive, a music show hosted by Terry Salomonson; and What's Cookin' with Chef Steve, music and interviews with Steve Mendoza.

Bevilacqua has also applied his knowledge and love of animation to paper. He co-edited Butler's Scenes for Actors and Voices (2003) with Ben Ohmart, and co-authored, compiled, edited, and illustrated Daws Butler's Uncle Dunkle and Donnie, released in 2009. He co-wrote the 2010 book Daws Butler: Characters Actor, the authorized biography of Butler, with Ohmart. In 2011, he signed a deal with Audible to distribute all of his audiobooks; the following year, he signed a new deal with Blackstone Audio. Between 2009 and 2014, they released more than 120 of his audio titles. Bevilacqua drew cover art for six Blackstone Audio titles in 2014 under the collective name A Joe Bev Cartoon. He also maintained the Official Daws Butler Biography Website, where he wrote articles and conducted interviews about Butler's work.

Bevilacqua's stage work includes roles in Equus, Bedroom Farce, Applause, Black Comedy, and other plays. He has toured regularly as Bud Abbott in A Tribute to Bud & Lou with Bob Greenberg as Lou Costello. Bevilacqua has performed at Caroline's on Broadway, Catch a Rising Star, the Comic Strip Live, and The Improv. He has worked with Uncle Floyd, Shelley Berman, and Lewis Black, and has MC'd shows featuring Jerry Seinfeld, Bill Maher and Gilbert Gottfried. Bevilacqua was also the voice of Unicycler Cat in the North Bay Corp animated television commercials.

He taught broadcasting at Marist College in 2006.

== Awards ==
- 2001 – New York Festivals Best Documentary award for Lady Bird Johnson: Legacy of a First Lady
- 2004 – Silver Reel Award from the National Federation of Community Broadcasters for his personal essay, "A Guy Named Joe Bevilacqua".
- 2006 – New York Festivals award for a tribute to Joe Barbera on All Things Considered
- 2012 – Theatre Association of New York (TANYS) Award for Excellence in Ensemble Acting with Bob Greenberg for their portrayals of Bud Abbott and Lou Costello
- 2013 – Kean University Distinguished Alumni Award

== Personal life ==
Bevilacqua and his wife Lorie Kellogg, also a voice actor, lived in the Catskills, New York at a house called Camp Waterlogg. Around 2014, he was diagnosed with a "minor" form of prostate cancer.

== Filmography ==
=== Film ===
Year	Title	Role	Notes	Ref(s)
2014	The Better Angels	Lawyer		
2014	Cold in July	Coroner	Uncredited	
2014	Hits	Angry Townsperson	Uncredited	
2014	John Wick	Man on Bus Reading the New York Times	Uncredited	
2014	The Fly Room	Uncle Dwight		
2015	The Wannabe	Giuseppe	Uncredited	
2017	The Two Worlds of William March	Dr. Edward Glover		
2019	The Gandhi Murder	Abraham Lincoln		
2019	Love Is Blind	Bar Fly Shooting Darts	Uncredited	
2019	The Irishman	Cadillac Linen Service Worker	Uncredited	
2019	Just in Time	Alan Mackey	Short Film	

=== Television ===
Year	Title	Role	Notes	Ref(s)
1999	Star Trek: Voyager	Crew Member	Episode: "Course: Oblivion"; uncredited	
2013	Deadly Devotion	IRS Agent	Documentary; 2 episodes	
2014	The World Wars	Field Marshal Bernard Montgomery	Documentary; Episode: "Never Surrender"	
2014	Mysteries at the Monument	Nikola Tesla	Episode: "The King and the Spanish Dancer; a Communist Comes to America; Filth Party"	
2014	Boardwalk Empire	David Sarnoff	Episode: "Eldorado"	
2014	Greatest Mysteries	General Smedley Butler	Documentary; Episode: "White House"	
2014–2016	Mysteries at the Museum	Devil Anse Hatfield / French Resistance Decoder / Art Expert	Documentary; 3 episodes	
2015	Redrum	Terry King	Episode: "Families and Foes"	
2015	The Haunting of...	Alysia Reiner's Father / Alan Ladd	2 episodes	
2016	Blood Feuds	Randall McCoy	Episode: "Hatfields and McCoys"	
