= I'm Cold =

- Directed by: Tex Avery
- Story by: Homer Brightman
- Produced by: Walter Lantz
- Starring: Daws Butler; Tex Avery; Grace Stafford
- Music by: Clarence Wheeler
- Animation by: Ray Abrams; Laverne Harding; Don Patterson
- Layouts by: Raymond Jacobs
- Color process: Technicolor
- Production company: Walter Lantz Productions
- Distributed by: Universal Pictures
- Release date: December 20, 1954
- Running time: 6 minutes
- Language: English

I'm Cold is a 1954 Chilly Willy cartoon directed by Tex Avery and produced by Walter Lantz. It was the first Chilly Willy cartoon directed by Avery. Chilly Willy also got a major redesign by Avery. This cartoon features the debut of Smedley Dog (voiced by Daws Butler in his "Huckleberry Hound" voice), who would appear in later Chilly Willy shorts.

== Summary ==
Chilly is freezing at his igloo home and burns everything (one log and pages of a book) in his fireplace until he pulls off an ad for a fur factory guarded by Smedley and realizes that warmth is only a visit away.

== Cast ==
- Grace Stafford - Chilly Willy (uncredited)
- Daws Butler - Smedley
- Tex Avery - Smedley (yawning)

== See also ==
- The Legend of Rockabye Point (1955)
- Tex Avery
