= Clarence Wheeler =

American musician and composer

- Born: September 27, 1885; Walnut, Kansas
- Died: December 28, 1966 (aged 81)
- Other name: Hoju
- Occupations: musician and composer
- Known for: Woody Woodpecker music

Clarence E. Wheeler (September 27, 1885 – December 28, 1966) was an American musician and composer. He created the music for many of Woody Woodpecker series cartoons under Walter Lantz Productions along with films in the 1950s.

== Biography ==
Wheeler was born in Walnut, Kansas. He formed an orchestra that appeared on the radio in Chicago in the 1930s, playing on The Terminix All-Star Program in May 1933 on WBBM. He was music director of the station from 1935 to 1938 and was replaced by Caesar Petrillo, brother of future American Federation of Musicians boss James Petrillo. He arrived in Hollywood that year and began writing music published by Alberto Colombo. Among his compositions were Cinemaland Parade, Silhouette in Rhythm, Sing For Our Fallen Brave, There Must Be a Way, Hey There, Mr. Labor, That Night in Donegal, Tiny Little Big Shot, Hello Broadway, London Calling, the last four with James J. May.

He soon went into scoring short films. His first credit was in the 1941 Columbia Pictures release The Carpenters, directed by former Warner Bros. animator Paul Fennell, where radio commentator Raymond Gram Swing reviewed the history of the invasion of Poland. He was hired in 1944 by George Pal to provide the scores for his Puppetoons and live-action shorts such as This is Oil (1949), released by Paramount Pictures. Wheeler also worked on features, providing orchestrations for Shirley Temple's teen star vehicle, Miss Annie Rooney (1942), the all-star extravaganza Tales of Manhattan (1942), and a number of the Blondie movies released by Columbia in the 1940s.

Wheeler also scored for early television programs, being hired by Jerry Fairbanks to write music for the series Public Prosecutor in 1948. That same year Wheeler also created the original opening and closing theme for the animated series Crusader Rabbit, adapting and arranging the folk melodies The Trail to Mexico (known on cue sheets as "Rabbit Fanfare") and Ten Little Indians (known as "Main Title Rabbit").

Some of Wheeler's film music was recompiled as stock music and leased to television producers, for airing on programs such as Topper, The Untouchables, Wyatt Earp and Gumby.

His first animated cartoon score was The 3 Minnies: Sota, Tonka and Ha-Ha! (1949), distributed by Republic Pictures. When Walter Lantz re-opened his studio in 1950 he hired Wheeler to score all his cartoons, almost 140 in total, beginning with Puny Express through The Nautical Nut, which was released in 1967 after Wheeler's death.
