= The Legend of Rockabye Point =

- Directed by: Tex Avery
- Story by: Michael Maltese
- Produced by: Walter Lantz
- Starring: Dal McKennon; Tex Avery (both uncredited)
- Music by: Clarence Wheeler
- Animation by: Ray Abrams; Don Patterson; Laverne Harding
- Layouts by: Tex Avery (uncredited)
- Backgrounds by: Raymond Jacobs
- Color process: Technicolor
- Production company: Walter Lantz Productions
- Distributed by: Universal Pictures
- Release date: April 11, 1955
- Running time: 6 minutes
- Language: English

The Legend of Rockabye Point is a 1955 Chilly Willy cartoon directed by Tex Avery. It was produced by Walter Lantz Productions and was released on April 11, 1955. The cartoon was nominated for the Academy Award for Best Animated Short Film in the same year, but would lose to the Merrie Melodies short Speedy Gonzales.

This is also the second (and last) Chilly Willy cartoon directed by Tex Avery. The plot of the cartoon resembles an earlier cartoon Avery directed, that being the 1952 short Rock-a-Bye Bear for MGM. Charlie the Polarbear would also serve as a precursor to the character Maxie the Polarbear, who would first appear in the short Polar Fright eleven years later.

== Plot ==
A still from the short, animated by Ray Abrams

An old fisherman tells the legend of a starving polar bear (Charlie) and Chilly Willy, who attempted to steal bluefin tuna from his ship 20 years before. As both Charlie and Chilly Willy rush over to the boat – each with a sack in hand to steal themselves a haul of fish, Charlie manages to tie up Chilly Willy in his own sack and tosses him away, hoping to get all the fish for himself. Charlie however runs afoul of a vicious guard dog aboard the ship, who bites him in his rear end.

Through the rest of the film, Chilly tries to foil Charlie's plot of stealing all the fish by waking up the dog numerous times, which involve using black pepper, roller skates, anvils, sticks of dynamite and a clarinet. To keep the dog from waking up, Charlie rocks him in his arms, and sings "Rock-A-Bye Baby" to him to make him nod off, which serves as a running gag throughout the short.

Charlie eventually decides to take the dog outside into the snow where he cannot cause him any more harm. He runs back inside the ship where he finds Chilly with a bulging full sack. Charlie steals the sack and flicks Chilly away with his toe, then boards a motorboat and speeds off to a nearby tall iceberg. Charlie runs to the top of the peak, ready to eat what he thinks is a large pile of fresh fish, but as he empties the sack, the guard dog falls out. Charlie panics and quickly grabs the dog and sings him to sleep yet again.

At the end of the film, the fisherman finishes the story and says to the audience that if they listen carefully, they can to this day still hear the lullaby at night. Indeed, at the peak, the pair still stand – now both very old and grey – with Charlie holding the dog tenderly and continuing to sing "Rock-A-Bye Baby" at the dog's request.

== Cast ==
- Dallas McKennon – Captain / Guard Dog / Polar Bear Charlie
- Tex Avery – Vocal Effects

== Awards ==
The Legend of Rockabye Point was nominated for an Academy Award for Best Animated Short Film, but lost to Warner Bros.' Speedy Gonzales.
