= List of theatrical animated short film series =

The following is a list of film theatrical short animated cartoon series ordered by the decade and year their first episode was first publicly presented. Most notable among these series were produced during the silent era and the golden era of Hollywood. All series below are from the United States of America except as noted. A real time interval of the first public screenings can be wider than indicated here due to incompleteness of reliable information about a series.

== 1900s ==
- Fantoche (1908, 1911, 1921, from France)

== 1910s ==
- The Newlyweds (1913–1914)
- Travelaughs (1913, 1915–1918, 1921–1923)
- Doc Yak (1913–1915)
- Colonel Heeza Liar (1913–1917, 1922–1924)
- Hesanut (1914–1915)
- Joe Boko (1914–1916)
- The Police Dog (1914–1916)
- Bertlevyettes (1915)
- Kriterion Komic Kartoons (1915)
- The Animated Grouch Chasers (1915)
- Dreamy Dud (1915–1916)
- Otto Luck (1915)
- Bobby Bumps (1915–1923, 1925)
- Mile-a-Minute Monty (1915)
- Keeping Up with the Joneses (1915–1916)
- Canimated Nooz Pictorial (1915–1917)
- Vernon Howe Bailey's Sketchbook (1915–1916)
- Phables (1915–1916 (initial name), 1916, 1919 (Joys and Gloom))
- The Travels of Teddy (1915)
- Sammie Johnsin (1916–1917)
- Mr. Nobody Holme (1916)
- Farmer Al Falfa (1916–1917, 1920, 1922–1923 (silent cartoons), 1931–1937 (sound cartoons))
- Maud the Mule (1916)
- Parcel Post Pete (1916)
- Mutt and Jeff (1916–1923, 1925–1926)
- Miss Nanny Goat (1916–1917)
- Krazy Kat (1916–1917, 1920–1921, 1925–1929 (silent cartoons), 1929–1934 (sound black-and-white cartoons), 1935–1940 (sound cartoons in color))
- The Trick Kids (1916)
- Historical cartoons (1916–1919)
- Kartoon Komics (1916–1917)
- Toyland (1916)
- Inbad the Sailor (1916)
- The Boob Weekly (1916)
- Fuller Pep (1916–1917)
- Charlie (1916, 1918–1919)
- Hans and Fritz (1916)
- Grogg the Sailor Man (1916–1922, from Sweden)
- Happy Hooligan (1916–1921)
- Jerry on the Job (1916–1917, 1919–1920)
- Bringing Up Father (1916–1918)
- The Katzenjammer Kids (1916–1918 (initial name, silent cartoons), 1920 (The Shenanigan Kids, silent cartoons), 1938–1939 (The Captain and the Kids, sound cartoons))
- Boomer Bill (1917)
- Hardrock Dome (1917)
- Quacky Doodles (1917)
- Picto Puzzles (1917)
- The Cartoons of Benjamin Rabier (French: Les Dessins animés de Benjamin Rabier) (1917–1920, 1922–1923, from France)
- Flambeau (1917, 1919, 1922, 1923 from France)
- Terry Feature Burlesques (1917)
- Terry Human Interest Reels (1917)
- Les Aventures des Pieds Nickelés (1917–1918, from France)
- Box Car Bill (1917)
- Hammon Eggs (1917)
- Abie the Agent (1917)
- Rhyme Reels (1917)
- Goodrich Dirt (1917–1919)
- Out of the Inkwell (1918–1927 (initial name), 1927–1929 (Inkwell Imps))
- Animated Technical Drawings (1918)
- B.D.F. Cartoons (1918–1919, 1921–1926)
- Von Loon (1918)
- Judge Rummy (1918–1921)
- Tad Cartoons (1918–1920)
- Us Fellers (1919–1920)
- Felix the Cat (1919–1920, 1922–1928 (silent cartoons), 1929–1930 (sound black-and-white cartoons), 1936 (sound cartoons in color))
- Cinema Luke (1919–1920)
- Bécassotte (1919–1920, from France)

== 1920s ==
- Screen Follies (1920)
- Bud and Susie (1920–1921)
- Lampoons (1920)
- Ginger Snaps (1920)
- The Gumps (1920–1921)
- Silly Hoots (1920–1921)
- Such is Life (1920–1922)
- Peanut Comedies (1920–1921)
- Aesop's Fables (1920–1929 (silent cartoons), 1928–1933, 1945, 1950–1953, 1955, 1960 (sound cartoons))
- Scat Cat (1920)
- Laugh-O-Grams (1921–1922, 1927)
- Tony Sarg's Almanac (1921–1923)
- Sketchografs (1921–1923, 1926)
- Dreams of a Rarebit Fiend (1921)
- Le Canard en ciné (1921–1923, from France)
- Mécanicas (1921, 1923–1925, from France)
- Toby (1921, from France)
- Toto (1921–1924, 1926, 1931, from France)
- Potiron (1921–1922, from France)
- American Picture Book (1922)
- Roving Thomas (1922–1923)
- Hodge Podge (1922–1929)
- Technical Romances (1922–1923)
- Ink-Ravings (1922–1923)
- Silliettes (1923–1925)
- Fun from the Press (1923)
- Tom and Jerry (1923)
- Red Head Comedies (1923)
- Alice Comedies (1924–1927)
- Song Car-Tunes (1924–1927 (initial name, black-and-white cartoons), 1929–1938 (Screen Songs, black-and-white cartoons), 1947–1951 (Screen Songs, cartoons in color))
- Historiets (1924)
- Dinky Doodle (1924–1926)
- Animated Hair (1924–1927)
- Animated Crosswords (1925)
- Judge's Crossword Puzzles (1925)
- Ebenezer Ebony (1925)
- Un-Natural History (1925–1927)
- Little Ebony (1925–1926)
- Colored Cartoon Comics (1925)
- Popular Song Parodies (1926)
- Scenic Sketchographs (1926)
- Pete the Pup (1926–1927)
- Camera Mysteries (1926)
- Outlandish History (1926)
- Oswald the Lucky Rabbit (1927–1928 (silent cartoons), 1929–1938, 1943 (sound cartoons))
- Newslaffs (1927–1928)
- Inklings (1927–1928)
- Mickey Mouse (1928–1942, 1947–1948, 1951–1953, 1983, 1990, 1995, 2013)
- Silly Symphonies (1929–1939)
- Talkartoons (1929–1932)

== 1930s ==
- Flip the Frog (1930–1933)
- Looney Tunes (1930–1969, 1987–2014)
- Toby the Pup (1930–1931)
- Merrie Melodies (1931–1969, 1988)
- Scrappy (1931–1941)
- Tom and Jerry (1931–1933)
- Betty Boop (1932–1939)
- Pooch the Pup (1932–1933)
- Cubby the Bear (1933–1934)
- Little King (1933–1934)
- Popeye the Sailor (1933–1957)
- Fanny Zilch (1933–1935)
- Willie Whopper (1933–1934)
- ComiColor Cartoons (1933–1936)
- Amos & Andy (1934)
- Burt Gillett's Toddle Tales (1934)
- Color Classics (1934–1941)
- Happy Harmonies (1934–1938)
- Rainbow Parade (1934–1936)
- Walter Lantz Cartune Specials (1934–1961)
- Color Rhapsodies (1934–1949)
- Puddy the Pup (1935–1942)
- Barney Google (1935–1936)
- Mish Mish Effendi (1936–1951)
- Kiko the Kangaroo (1936–1937)
- Meany, Miny, and Moe (1936–1937)
- Nicky Nome (1936–1939)
- Donald Duck (1937–1961)
- Oil Can Harry (1937)
- Pluto (1937–1951)
- Metro-Goldwyn-Mayer Cartoons (1937–1967)
- Baby-Face Mouse (1938–1939)
- Gandy Goose (1938–1955)
- Walt Disney Specials (1938–present)
- Andy Panda (1939–1949)
- Barney Bear (1939–1945, 1948–1949, 1952–1954)
- Count Screwloose (1939)
- Goofy (1939–1965, 2007)
- Fables (1939–1942)
- Phantasies (1939–1948)
- Lil' Eightball (1939)
- Dinky Duck (1939–1958)

== 1940s ==
- Animated Antics (1940–1941)
- Stone Age Cartoons (1940–1941)
- Tom and Jerry (1940–1958, 1961–1967, 2005)
- Gabby (1940–1941)
- Woody Woodpecker (1941–1972)
- George Pal's Puppetoons (1941–1947)
- Paramount Cartoon Specials (1941–1992)
- Superman (1941–1943)
- Swing Symphonies (1941–1945)
- Nancy (1942)
- Mighty Mouse (1942–1961)
- Abu (1943–1945; from the United Kingdom; by Halas and Batchelor)
- Figaro (1943–1947)
- Noveltoons (1943–1967)
- Little Lulu (1943–1948)
- Droopy (1943–1958)
- Red (1943–1949)
- The Fox and the Crow (1943–1949)
- Screwy Squirrel (1944–1946)
- Li'l Abner (1944)
- Flippy and Flop (1946–1947)
- Charley (1946–1947; from the United Kingdom)
- George and Junior (1946–1948)
- Heckle and Jeckle (1946–1966)
- Musical Miniatures (1946–1948)
- Bubble and Squeek (1946–1948; from the United Kingdom)
- Charlie Horse (1947)
- Animaland (1948–1949; from the United Kingdom)
- Musical Paintbox (1948–1949; from the United Kingdom)
- Spike (1949–1957)
- Jerky Journeys (1949)
- Jolly Frolics (1949–1953)

== 1950s ==
- Dingbat (1950)
- The Nearsighted Mister Magoo (1950–1959)
- Little Roquefort (1950–1955)
- Casper the Friendly Ghost (1950–1959)
- Chip 'n' Dale (1951–1954)
- Half Pint (1951)
- Kartunes (1951–1953)
- Terry Bears (1951–1956)
- Herman and Katnip (1952–1959)
- Adventures in Music (1953)
- Chilly Willy (1953–1972)
- Maw and Paw (1953–1955)
- UPA Cartoon Specials (1953–1956)
- Gerald McBoing-Boing (1953–1956)
- Dimwit (1953–1957)
- Sugarfoot (1954)
- Phony Baloney (1954–1957)
- Willie Walrus (1954–1955)
- Maggie and Sam (1955–1957)
- Good Deed Daly (1955–1956)
- Humphrey the Bear (1956)
- Mole (1956–present; from Czechoslovakia/Czech Republic)
- John Doormat (1957–1959)
- Spike and Tyke (1957)
- Gaston Le Crayon (1957–1959)
- Clint Clobber (1957–1959)
- Windy & Breezy (1958–1959)
- Ham and Hattie (1958–1959)
- Modern Madcaps (1958–1967)
- Sidney the Elephant (1958–1963)
- Foofle (1959–1960)
- Hector Heathcote (1959–1971)
- Hickory, Dickory, and Doc (later Doc, 1959–1962)
- Loopy De Loop (1959–1965)
- Hashimoto-san (1959–1963)

== 1960s ==
- Jeepers and Creepers (1960)
- Fatso the Bear (1960–1961)
- Mr. Rossi (1960–1974; from Italy)
- The Cat (1961)
- Inspector Willoughby (1961–1965)
- Comic Kings (1962–1963)
- Deputy Dawg (1962–1963)
- The Beary Family (1962–1972)
- Luno the White Stallion (1963–1964)
- Duckwood (1964)
- Astronut (1964–1971)
- Swifty and Shorty (1964–1965)
- Pink Panther (1964–1980, 1995)
- Sad Cat (1965–1968)
- Possible Possum (1965–1971)
- Honey Halfwitch (1965–1967)
- The Inspector (1965–1969)
- Nudnik (1965–1967; from Czechoslovakia/Czech Republic)
- James Hound (1966–1967)
- Martian Moochers (1966)
- Winnie the Pooh (1966–1983)
- Mortadelo y Filemón, Agencia de Información (Mort and Phil, Information Agency) (1966–1970; from Spain)
- Mighty Heroes (1966–1967)
- Merry Makers (1967)
- GoGo Toons (1967)
- Fractured Fables (1967)
- Cossacks (1967–1995; from the Soviet Union/Russia and Ukraine)
- Roland and Rattfink (1968–1971)
- Warner Bros. Cartoon Specials (1968)
- The Ant and the Aardvark (1969–1971)
- Tijuana Toads/Texas Toads (1969–1972)
- Nu, pogodi! (1969–2006; from the Soviet Union/Russia)
- Vinni Pukh (1969–1972; from the Soviet Union/Russia)
- Cheburashka (1969–1983; from the Soviet Union/Russia)

== 1970s ==
- The Three Fools (1970–1990; from Bulgaria)
- The Blue Racer (1972–1974)
- Hoot Kloot (1973–1974)
- The Dogfather (1974–1976)
- 38 Parrots (1976–1991; from the Soviet Union/Russia)

== 1980s ==
- Doraemon (1981–present; from Japan)
- Pixar Shorts (1984–2018)
- Adventures of the Piglet Foontic (1986–1988; from the Soviet Union/Russia)
- Roger Rabbit (1989–1993)
- Wallace and Gromit (1989–present; from the United Kingdom)

== 1990s ==
- Let's Go! Anpanman (1990–present; from Japan)
- Pikachu shorts (1998–present; from Japan)
- Astro Boy (1999–2004; from Japan)

== 2000s ==
- Dahov (2007–2010; from Russia)
- The ChubbChubbs! (2002–2007)
- DreamWorks Shorts (2005–2025)
- Cars Toons: Mater's Tall Tales (2008–2012)

== 2010s ==
- Toy Story Toons (2011–2012)
- Maggie Simpson (2012–2020)
- Cars Toons: Tales from Radiator Springs (2013–2014)
- Minions (2016–2024)
- SparkShorts (2019–2024)

== 2020s ==
- Short Circuit (2020–2026)

== Sources ==
- Beck, Jerry; Friedwald, Will (1989). Looney Tunes and Merrie Melodies: A Complete Illustrated Guide to the Warner Bros. Cartoons (1st ed.). New York, NY: Henry Holt and Company, Inc. ISBN 978-0-8050-0894-4.
- Bendazzi, Giannalberto (2016). Animation: A World History. Vol. 1. Boca Raton, FL: CRC Press. ISBN 978-1-1388-5452-9.
- Crafton, Donald (1990). Emile Cohl, caricature, and film. Princeton, NJ: Princeton University Press. ISBN 978-0-691-05581-7.
- Lenburg, Jeff (2009). The Encyclopedia of Animated Cartoons (3rd ed.). New York, NY: Facts On File. ISBN 978-0-8160-6599-8.
- Merritt, Russell; Kaufman, J.B. (1993). Walt in Wonderland: The Silent Films of Walt Disney. Baltimore, MD: Johns Hopkins University Press. ISBN 978-0-8018-4907-7.
- Hamonic, Gerald (2017). Terrytoons: The Story of Paul Terry and His Classic Cartoon Factory. Indiana University Press. pp. 347–362. ISBN 978-0-86196-729-2.
