= Space Mouse =

Comic book character

- "Space Mouse" logo (art by Walter Lantz Productions)

Ownership information
- Space Mouse, 1953: Avon Publications
- Space Mouse, 1959: Walter Lantz Productions/ Universal Pictures
- Space Mouse, 1960: Created by Dell Comics for Walter Lantz Productions/ Universal Pictures

The first Space Mouse is a comic book character published from 1953 to around 1956 by Avon Publications. Space Mouse is also the name of a 1959 Universal Pictures cartoon featuring two mice and a cat named Hickory, Dickory, and Doc. A second Space Mouse character was published by Dell Comics (and later by Gold Key Comics) from 1960 to around 1965. The Dell Comics version was also featured in a 1960 cartoon produced by Walter Lantz, entitled The Secret Weapon.

== Incarnations ==
=== Avon Publications ===
Space Mouse (1953)
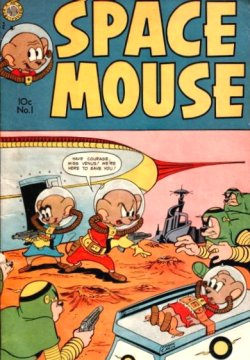
- Avon's Space Mouse (art by Frank Carin)

Publication information
- Publisher: Avon Publications
- Format: Comic book
- First appearance: Space Mouse #1 (Avon, April 1953)
- Last appearance: Possibly Peter Rabbit #33 (Avon, June–July 1956)
- Creators: Artwork by Frank Carin

Character information
- Secret identity: Unrevealed
- Place of origin: Earth
- Species: Anthropomorphic mouse
- Supporting cast: Millie (girlfriend)

The original Space Mouse first appeared in Space Mouse #1, cover dated April 1953. He appeared regularly in a number of Avon titles throughout 1953, then only sporadically from 1954 to around 1956.

The introductory story of Space Mouse is entitled "The Great Electro!" A large, brutish cat named Electro calls Earth from Mercury. He informs Space Mouse that a group of Earth's explorers had landed on Mercury, and have been captured and are being held prisoner. They will be held as slaves as a warning to the rest of Earth. Space Mouse and his girlfriend Millie head off to Mercury in the hero's rocket ship. As they approach the planet, Electro shoots bolts of lightning at them, to no effect. Next they are hit with sound waves, and need to pull out of range. They soon learn that the entire city is covered with electrical wiring. The duo try to sneak in, but Electro is watching. They are captured and imprisoned, but Space Mouse spots some loose wires and successfully blows a fuse. The hero short-circuits Electro with his ray gun, causing the cat to become frail. Space Mouse discovers that the explorers have been turned into horses, but he is easily able to turn them back to normal with his ray gun. The hero then escorts the freed explorers back to Earth.

The last story in that first issue, "Atomic Attack!", appears to be the earliest chronological adventure of Space Mouse (the hero shows Millie a rocket ship which he has just built, which is the same rocket ship used in the previous stories). In this tale, Space Mouse and Millie notice a strange growth in the backyard and discover that it is being caused by an atomic ray from Mars. Space Mouse believes that the whole Earth will be covered with the growth, choking off all forms of life. The hero takes Millie to the roof and shows her a new rocket ship that he has built, which they will take to Mars. After landing, they wander around the planet, not finding a soul. While they are sleeping, however, Millie is kidnapped. Space Mouse chases the kidnapper to a strange-looking city, where he discovers a ray machine projecting the atomic growth onto the Earth. He throws a monkey wrench into the machine, destroying it. The hero is captured by canine soldiers and brought before the Great Master, ruler of the planet Mars, a gigantic metallic dog holding Millie in his hand. The soldiers leave Space Mouse with the Master, who explains that the duo have interfered with his plans to invade Earth and turn everyone into slaves. For that crime, he sentences them to death. Space Mouse realizes the Great Master is just a big mechanical man, and discovers an ordinary cat inside. He forces the cat to release Millie, and the two race back to their rocket ship, but the cat follows, begging Space Mouse to take him with them. The Martian soldiers found out what he is, and are now in pursuit. Back on Earth, after making the cat clean the growth from his yard, Space Mouse hands him over to the police.

In other tales from this issue, Space Mouse visits a moon of Jupiter named ICHI (in "Terry and the Dream-Makers"), and visits both the planets Venus (in "Beauty Contest!") and Jupiter (in "Flying Saucers!") for the first time. Space Mouse is occasionally spelled "Spacemouse", and Millie is also spelled "Milly" in "Atomic Attack!" (in a later issue, she is referred to as "Molly").

Publication history (list may not be complete):

- Space Mouse (Avon Publications) #1 (Apr 1953), #2 (?? 1953), #3 (?? 1953), #4 (Jan–Feb 1954), #5 (Apr–May 1954)
- Funny Tunes (Avon Publications) #1 (Jul 1953), #2 (Sep 1953), #3 (Dec 1953 – Jan 1954), series continues as Space Comics #4
- Peter Rabbit (Avon Publications) #18 (Jul 1953), #19 (?? 1953), #20 (Dec 1953 – Jan 1954), #30 (Dec 1955 – Jan 1956), #32 (Apr–May 1956), #33 (Jun–Jul 1956)
- Space Comics (Avon Publications) #4 (Mar–Apr 1954) - #5 (May–Jun 1954)
- Space Comics (I. W. Publications) #8 (1958, reprints cover of Avon's Space Comics #4 and one Space Mouse story)
- Famous Funnies (I. W. Publications) #18 (1964, reprints two Space Mouse stories)

=== The "Space Mouse" cartoon featuring Hickory, Dickory, and Doc (1959) ===
Space Mouse (1959)
- Opening title for the 1959 cartoon Space Mouse featuring Hickory, Dickory, and Doc (art by Walter Lantz Productions).

Film information
- Film studio: Universal Pictures
- Format: Animated cartoon
- Debut: Space Mouse (Sep 7, 1959)
- Production #: U-103
- Runtime: 6 minutes
- Creators: Produced by Walter Lantz, directed by Alex Lovy, Paul Frees as Doc, Dal McKennon as Hickory, Grace Stafford as Dickory, music by Clarence Wheeler

Episode details
- Main cast: Hickory, Dickory, and Doc
- Species: Anthropomorphic mice and cat
- Setting: Earth

In the 1959 "Space Mouse" theatrical short by Universal Pictures, a cat named Doc attempts to capture and sell two mice, Hickory and Dickory, to NASA for laboratory tests. Hickory, Dickory, and Doc appeared together in two more shorts. Doc subsequently appeared solo in six more Universal cartoons.

List of cartoons featuring Hickory, Dickory, and Doc:

- "Space Mouse" (Prod #U-103, Sep 7, 1959)
- "Mouse Trapped" (Prod #U-104, Dec 8, 1959)
- "Witty Kitty" (Prod #U-106, Jan 5, 1960 or Feb 2, 1960?)

List of cartoons featuring Doc (solo):

- "Freeloading Feline" (Prod #U-116, Jun 15, 1960 or Sep 7, 1960?)
- "Tin Can Concert Presents The Cinderella Overture by Rossini" (Prod #U-137, Oct 1, 1961 or Oct 31, 1961?)
- "Doc's Last Stand" (Prod #U-139, Dec 19, 1961)
- "Pest Of Show" (Prod #U-143, Feb 13, 1962)
- "Punchy Pooch" (Prod #U-145, Sep 4, 1962)
- "Corny Concerto" (Prod #U-157, Oct 30, 1962)

=== Walter Lantz' Space Mouse comic book and cartoon character (1960) ===
Space Mouse (1960)
- Four Color #1132 (Dell Comics, Aug–Oct 1960), art by John Carey

Publication information
- Publisher: Dell Publishing
- Format: Comic book
- First appearance: Four Color, Series II #1132 (Dell, Aug–Oct 1960)
- Last appearance: Possibly Woody Woodpecker #85 (Gold Key Comics, June 1965)
- Creators: Concept by Chase Craig, artwork by John Carey, written by Carl Fallberg

Film information
- Film studio: Universal Pictures
- Format: Animated cartoon
- Debut: The Secret Weapon (?? 1960)
- Production #: SM-1
- Runtime: 6 minutes
- Creators: Produced by Walter Lantz, directed by ?, Johnny Coons as Space Mouse, music by ?

Character information
- Secret identity: Unrevealed
- Place of origin: Rodentia
- Species: Anthropomorphic mouse
- Supporting cast: King Size

In 1959, Western Publishing held the license to produce comics based on the properties of Walter Lantz, such as Woody Woodpecker, Chilly Willy, and Andy Panda. Western realized that they were paying a lot of money to Lantz for the rights to his characters, but they were not getting as many different titles out of the arrangement as they would have liked. Western's executives instructed their senior editor, Chase Craig, to launch another comic book based on a Lantz property. He looked over the available characters and decided that none of them could sustain their own series.

Chase then spotted a press release from Walter Lantz Productions that indicated they were producing a cartoon short entitled Space Mouse. He imagined a Buck Rogers style strip, starring a mouse in a space suit, and felt it would make a great comic. Chase called Lantz's office and had them send over a copy of the Space Mouse storyboard. It turned out that the cartoon was not what Chase had been expecting at all. It was merely the title of the first cartoon in an intended series, starring Earth-bound characters named Hickory, Dickory, and Doc. Believing that a sci-fi mouse was still a great idea, Chase got together with his writers and artists and began working on the comic book he had in mind.

At that time, Dell Publishing paid Western to prepare and print the contents of their Dell Comics line, while Dell controlled the distribution. Throughout the years of their business arrangement, almost all of their comics featured licensed material, but a small battle was going on between the two companies over the ownership of properties appearing in the non-licensed comics. Dell claimed to own them because they were financing the books, while Western felt that these were creations of their employees, and thus belonged to them. As a result of these squabbles, there were periods when Western decided they would not create any new characters, and Space Mouse was conceived during one of those periods. Not wanting to find himself in the middle of an ownership fight, Chase decided to simply turn the concept over to Walter Lantz. After a few pages of the new strip were completed, Chase took them over to Lantz's office and asked for permission to publish the comic as a Lantz property and Lantz, who would own the copyright, agreed.

Following the publication of the initial issue, Four Color, Series II #1132, Walter Lantz produced a Space Mouse pilot entitled The Secret Weapon. The short was directed by Alex Lovy and featured the voice of Johnny Coons as Space Mouse. It was released in theaters in 1960, and was later shown on television in 1963 as part of The Woody Woodpecker Show. The character failed to graduate to a regular animated series, but Space Mouse did continue to appear in a handful of Dell Comics from 1960 through 1962. Then, following a dispute about money, Dell and Western finally parted ways. Afterwards, Western essentially kept the same comic book lines going, now financing the various series themselves, labeling their comics with Gold Key Comics logos. Gold Key continued publishing the adventures of Space Mouse at least into 1965.

The introductory story of the Walter Lantz Space Mouse is "The Secret Weapon". Space Mouse lives on the planet Rodentia, but he prefers to spend his time flying around the galaxy in his Lunar Schooner. The planet is ruled by King Size, who lives in Camembert Castle, located in Miceapolis, the capital of Rodentia. One day, the king receives an urgent message from his secret operator on his super-private inter-cosmic radio. King Size informs his Secretary of Finance, Count de Penny, that he has been warned that the cats on the planet Felinia are planning to invade Rodentia. The king contacts Space Mouse for help. The hero dons a disguise, posing as a Siamese-type cat named Charlie Chin, and lands on the outskirts of Catolina, the capital of Felinia. He soon investigates the headquarters of the dreaded Meow Meows, the gang behind the planned invasion. Inside is Black Tom, the leader, with a beautiful but mysterious girl named Persian Pearl. Space Mouse poses as their waiter, and learns about a fleet of rocket ships at a secret base near the Catnip Works. When his disguise tears at the pants, he is discovered. As Black Tom attempts to capture Space Mouse, he is hit over the head with a chair by Persian Pearl, who then helps Space Mouse escape. She reveals that she is in reality a mouse, King Size's secret agent. Later, when Space Mouse is surrounded by Black Tom and his gang, the hero swallows a pill given to him by the king, which renders him invisible. He makes it to his ship, but has failed in his mission. He radios ahead to Rodentia to warn them that the cats are on their way. The mice go underground and the invading cats soon take over the city. The cats then surround the castle. Inside, King Size receives a call from Space Mouse on his super-private inter-cosmic radio. The hero tells the king that he is coming with his secret weapon. Space Mouse's ship lands and the cats race towards him. The hero whistles, and four ferocious dogs leap out, chasing the cats away. Space Mouse explains to the king that they are his canine friends from the Dog Star.

Other stories in this issue introduce the king's nephew Rodney and Police Chief Cheddar. Villains include the wolves of Sky Raiders, Inc. and the Vermin Brothers. Space Mouse also visits the planet Goofoffus, home of the laziest characters in the universe. Also depicted are Rodentia's Space Rangers.

Publication history (list may not be complete):

- Four Color, Series II (Dell Comics) #1132: "Space Mouse" (Aug–Oct 1960)
- Dell Giant (Dell Comics) #40: "Woody Woodpecker's Christmas Parade" (Dec 1960)
- Four Color, Series II (Dell Comics) #1244: "Space Mouse" (Nov 1961 – Jan 1962)
- Dell Giant (Dell Comics) #54: "Woody Woodpecker's Christmas Party" (Dec 1961)
- Comic Album (Dell Comics) #17: "Space Mouse" (Mar–May 1962)
- Walter Lantz' Space Mouse (Gold Key Comics) #1 (Nov 1962)
- Walter Lantz' Woody Woodpecker (Gold Key Comics) #74 (Dec 1962)
- Walter Lantz' Space Mouse (Gold Key Comics) #2 (Feb 1963)
- Walter Lantz' Woody Woodpecker (Gold Key Comics) #75 (Mar 1963)
- Walter Lantz' Space Mouse (Gold Key Comics) #3 (May 1963)
- Walter Lantz' Space Mouse (Gold Key Comics) #4 (Aug 1963)
- Walter Lantz' Space Mouse (Gold Key Comics) #5 (Nov 1963)
- Walter Lantz' Woody Woodpecker (Gold Key Comics) #85 (Jun 1965)
- Golden Comics Digest (Gold Key Comics) #3 (Jul 1969, reprints one story from Walter Lantz' Space Mouse #1)
- Golden Comics Digest (Gold Key Comics) #8 (Jan 1970, reprints one story from Walter Lantz' Space Mouse #3)
- Golden Comics Digest (Gold Key Comics) #12 (Aug 1970, reprints one story from Walter Lantz' Space Mouse #3)
- Golden Comics Digest (Gold Key Comics) #15 (Jan 1971, reprints one story from Walter Lantz' Space Mouse #5)
- Golden Comics Digest (Gold Key Comics) #24 (Jul 1972, reprints one story from Four Color #1244)
- Golden Comics Digest (Gold Key Comics) #32 (Sep 1973, reprints one story from Four Color #1244)

The plot of Space Mouse's theatrical debut, "The Secret Weapon", is virtually identical to the initial comic book story of the same name. Minor differences between the two include the change of the Secretary of Finance's name from "Count de Penny" to "Count de Pennies" and the secret agent being given the official title of "Agent X".

The animated Space Mouse next appeared in the 1964 Halloween episode of The Woody Woodpecker Show entitled "Spook-A-Nanny". In addition to Woody Woodpecker and Space Mouse, the Halloween party guests included Splinter & Knothead, Andy Panda, Chilly Willy, Smedley the dog, Buzz Buzzard, Wally Walrus, Homer Pigeon, and Sugarfoot the horse.

According to some sources, that was not the end of Space Mouse. In 1999, Fox Kids aired The New Woody Woodpecker Show, using the traditional format of three segments featuring different characters. Woody's supporting segments starred Chilly Willy and, allegedly, Space Mouse. It was later discovered that Space Mouse got scrapped from the 1999 show due to some executive meddling, although the character, with his 1999 scrapped show redesign, was featured in a comic version at that time, published by the Mexican publisher Grupo Editorial Vid in the comic book El Pájaro Loco, illustrated by Alejandro Palomares. Space Mouse also was featured as an unlockable racer in the video game Woody Woodpecker Racing, using his 1999 scrapped show redesign.

List of cartoons featuring Space Mouse:

- Space Mouse in "The Secret Weapon" (Prod #SM-1, 1960) - available on "Woody Woodpecker and Friends", Vol. 1 (DVD; Columbia House, Jan 1, 2003?) and "Woody Woodpecker and Friends Classic Cartoon Collection", Vol. 2, Disc 2 (DVD; Universal, Apr 15, 2008)
- The Woody Woodpecker Show episode, "Spook-A-Nanny" (Prod #TC-3, Oct 1964) - available on "Woody Woodpecker and Friends Classic Cartoon Collection", Vol. 1, Disc 3 (DVD; Universal, Jul 24, 2007)

== See also ==
- Walter Lantz Productions
- List of Walter Lantz cartoon characters
- Avon Publications
- I. W. Publications
- Dell Publishing
- Gold Key Comics
