= Scrub Me Mama with a Boogie Beat =

1941 film by Walter Lantz

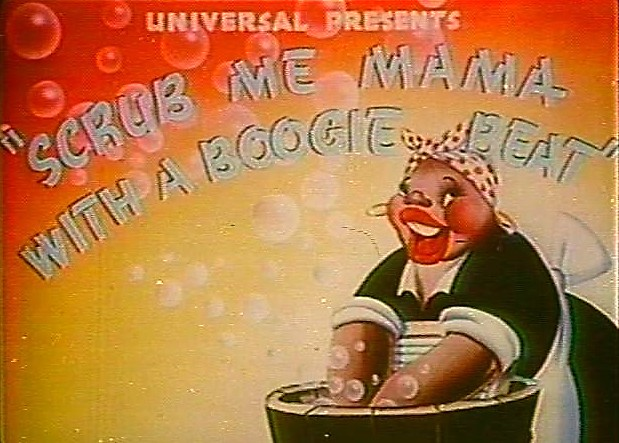
- Original title card
- Directed by: Walter Lantz
- Story by: Ben Hardaway
- Produced by: Walter Lantz
- Starring: Mel Blanc
- Music by: Darrell Calker
- Animation by: Alex Lovy; Frank Tipper
- Color process: Technicolor
- Production company: Walter Lantz Productions
- Distributed by: Universal Pictures
- Release date: March 28, 1941
- Running time: 7 min (one reel)
- Country: United States
- Language: English

Scrub Me Mama with a Boogie Beat

"Scrub Me Mama with a Boogie Beat" is a 1940 hit boogie-woogie song written by Don Raye. A bawdy, jazzy tune, the song describes a laundry woman from Harlem, New York whose technique is so unusual that people come from all around just to watch her scrub. The Andrews Sisters and Will Bradley & His Orchestra recorded the most successful pop versions of the song, but it is today best recognized as the centerpiece of an eponymous and controversial Walter Lantz cartoon from 1941, distributed by Universal Pictures. The short was denounced by the NAACP for its racist and stereotypical imagery of African-Americans.

== Plot ==
The short opens to an orchestral rendition of Stephen Foster's "Old Folks at Home" (1851), immediately setting the scene in the rural South of blackface minstrelsy. The setting is Lazy Town, described as a town where neither the town's residents (all stereotypes of dark-skinned African-Americans) nor the animals can be bothered to leave their reclining positions to do anything at all. Their pastoral existence is interrupted by the arrival of a riverboat, carrying a svelte, sophisticated, light-skinned black woman from Harlem (resembling Lena Horne), whose physical beauty inspires the entire populace to spring into action.

The visiting urbanite admonishes one of the town's residents: "Listen, Mammy. That ain't no way to wash clothes! What you all need is rhythm!" She then proceeds to sing "Scrub Me Mama with a Boogie Beat", which the townsfolk gradually join her in performing. Thus begins a montage which is the short's centerpiece. The townsfolk are infected by the song's rhythm and proceed to go about playing instruments, and dancing suggestively. By the time the young light-skinned black woman from Harlem is due to get on her riverboat and return home, she has succeeded in turning Lazy Town into a lively community of swing musicians simply by singing. The cartoon concludes with the mammy washerwoman bending over, displaying the words "The End" across the undergarments covering her end.

== Production ==
The short version, released on March 28, 1941, by Universal Pictures, features no director credit (although Woody Woodpecker creator Walter Lantz claimed to have directed the cartoon himself), with a story by Ben Hardaway, animation by Alex Lovy and Frank Tipper, and voiceover work by Mel Blanc and Nellie Lutcher. The short uses blackface caricatures based upon stereotypes of African Americans in the rural Southern United States.

The "Scrub Me Mama" short is today in the public domain. Clips from it are featured in the Spike Lee satirical film about African-American stereotypes, Bamboozled (2000).

== Reviews ==
Several tabloids during the spring of 1941, such as Boxoffice, The Film Daily, Motion Picture Exhibitor, and Motion Picture Herald, gave the film positive reviews, praising the story, animation, character's portrayal, and use of swing music, although The Film Daily considered the silhouette shots of skirts and exaggerated body movements within the film questionable for children's audiences.

== Controversy ==
The short was re-released in the fall of 1948, but on October 20, the NAACP wrote a letter to Universal Pictures. It objected to the "vicious caricature of Negro life in the South", and called the film "insulting", "derogatory" and "offensive". They found the short to depict Black people as lazy and only activated by swing music. They also objected to the images of scantily clad, dancing young women. They requested the end of distribution for the film and better judgment from Universal.

Nine days later, a representative of Universal wrote to the NAACP. He pointed out that none of the company's theaters had received complaints concerning the film. A few days later, on November 3, Madison Jones, Jr, who represented the NAACP, met with E.L. McEvoy, the Universal short sales distribution chief, at the New York City office of the studio. McEvoy defended the racist humor of the film. Jones responded that the NAACP was holding an education campaign against this type of humor.

McEvoy offered to let the NAACP contact the West Coast offices of the company, but he warned that in consequence for taking action, "niggers" would be prevented from getting work in the industry. He also claimed the NAACP members were better educated than the average audience member, who would not object to seeing racist images. Jones responded that this was a reason to avoid the racist films, that the audience might think them to be based on fact.

McEvoy pointed out that caricatures of Negroes, Jews, Germans, and Irish used to all be top entertainment. He emphasized that the office language at Universal also included the terms "sheenie" and "kike" (both used for Jews). He noted that the film had only been re-released since the Walter Lantz Studio had temporarily shut down (and stopped producing new content).

Later on November 20, the Los Angeles Tribune published an article on the complaints of the NAACP. In February 1949, Universal withdrew the film, following the protest. A memo dated February 19 of the same year revealed that the Jewish Labor Committee had co-operated with the NAACP in protesting the film.

== Gallery ==
Screen from short version
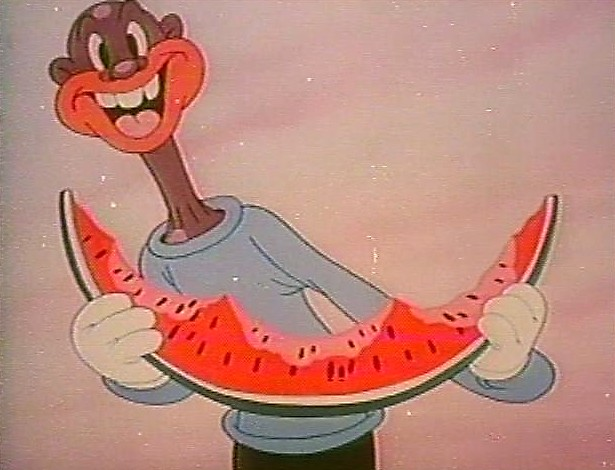
Dark-skinned man eating watermelon.

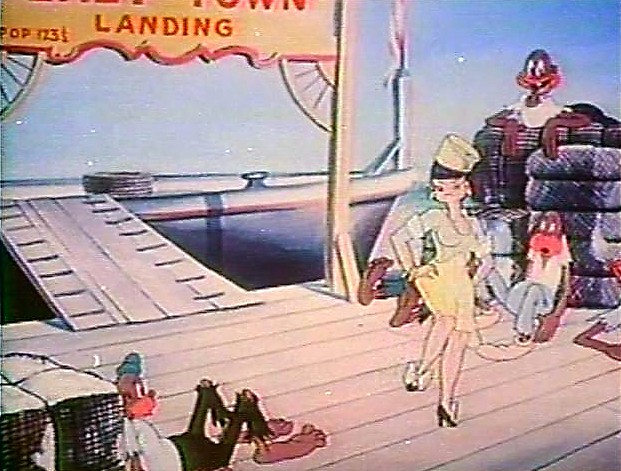
The dark-skinned residents of Lazy Town are excited upon the arrival of the unnamed light-skinned woman.

== See also ==
- Censored Eleven
- List of animated films in the public domain in the United States

== Bibliography ==
- Cohen, Karl F. (2004) [1997], "Racism and Resistance: Stereotypes in Animation", Forbidden Animation: Censored Cartoons and Blacklisted Animators in America, McFarland & Company, ISBN 978-0-7864-2032-2
