= Homer Pigeon =

- Homer Pigeon (art by Walter Lantz Studios)
- First appearance: Pigeon Patrol (1942)
- Last appearance: Spook-A-Nanny (1964)
- Created by: Walter Lantz; Alex Lovy
- Voiced by: Kent Rogers (1942–1943); Dallas McKennon (1956); Mel Blanc (1957); Gloria Wood (1957)

In-universe information
- Species: Pigeon
- Gender: Male

Homer Pigeon is an animated character created by Walter Lantz, who made his first appearance in the cartoon "Pigeon Patrol" in 1942. His final appearance was in 1964, in The Woody Woodpecker Show episode "Spook-A-Nanny".

The character's voice was based on Red Skelton's rube character, Clem Kadiddlehopper.

== List of appearances ==
- Pigeon Patrol (August 3, 1942)
- Swing Your Partner (April 26, 1943)
- The Auto-Lite Sparkys (1951)
- Pigeon Holed (January 16, 1956)
- Spook-A-Nanny (October 10, 1964)

== Comics ==
- Animal Comics (1943) (Dell)
- New Funnies (1943) (Dell)
- Walter Lantz New Funnies (1946) (Dell)
- Walter Lantz Andy Panda (1952) (Dell)
- Walter Lantz Woody Woodpecker (1952) (Dell)
- Woody Woodpecker's Back to School (1952) (Dell)
- Woody Woodpecker's Country Fair (1956) (Dell)
- Golden Comics Digest (1969) (Gold Key)
- Walter Lantz Andy Panda (1973) (Gold Key)

== See also ==
- Walter Lantz Productions
- List of Walter Lantz cartoon characters
