= Maggie & Sam =

Cartoon characters

- Maggie and Sam, as seen in "Crazy Mixed Up Pup" (art by Walter Lantz Studios).
- First appearance: Crazy Mixed Up Pup (1955)
- Last appearance: Fowled Up Party (1957) (Maggie); Woody and the Beanstalk (1966) (Sam)
- Created by: Walter Lantz; Tex Avery
- Voiced by: Daws Butler (Sam); Grace Stafford (Maggie)

In-universe information
- Species: Humans
- Gender: Male (Sam); Female (Maggie)

Sam in "The Ostrich Egg And I", art by Walter Lantz Studios.

Maggie and Sam are animated characters created by Walter Lantz, who made their first appearance in the cartoon "Crazy Mixed Up Pup" in 1955. Their final appearance was in 1957, in "Fowled Up Party". They were created by Tex Avery. Maggie was voiced by Grace Stafford and Sam by Daws Butler.

Sam appeared alone in a handful of Woody Woodpecker cartoons during the 1960s.

Maggie in "The Ostrich Egg And I", art by Walter Lantz Studios.

== List of appearances ==
- Crazy Mixed Up Pup (02/14/1955)
- The Ostrich Egg And I (04/09/1956)
- The Talking Dog (08/27/1956)
- Fowled Up Party (01/14/1957)
- Crowin' Pains (Sam, alone, 09/25/1962)
- The Tenant's Racket (Sam, alone, 08/30/1963)

== See also ==
- Walter Lantz Productions
- List of Walter Lantz cartoon characters
