= Crazy Mixed Up Pup =

- Directed by: Tex Avery
- Story by: Homer Brightman
- Produced by: Walter Lantz
- Starring: Daws Butler; Grace Stafford; Tex Avery
- Music by: Clarence Wheeler
- Animation by: Ray Abrams; Laverne Harding; Don Patterson
- Layouts by: Raymond Jacobs
- Color process: Technicolor
- Production company: Walter Lantz Productions
- Distributed by: Universal Pictures
- Release date: February 14, 1955
- Running time: 6 minutes
- Language: English

Crazy Mixed Up Pup is a 1955 cartoon directed by Tex Avery and produced by Walter Lantz. It was nominated for an Academy Award, but lost to the Mr. Magoo short When Magoo Flew.

== Plot ==
A man named Samuel "Sam" and his dog Rover are both flattened by a car whilst crossing the street. An ambulance then arrives and the medic accidentally gives them their opposite plasmas. After recovering, Sam begins to take on more doglike attributes, while Rover takes on more human attributes. Both cause strife in their home, which annoys Sam's wife, Margaret "Maggie" and her pet poodle, Fifi. Maggie finally gets fed up and leaves, taking Fifi with her. Then they get flattened themselves as Sam and Rover did. The same ambulance as before arrives, with the same medic who again mixes up the plasmas. Sam and Rover are despondent until Maggie comes bounding back on all fours, and Fifi returns in a bipedal stance. Sam and Maggie bark and bound with joy, while Rover and Fifi embrace, able to converse in English.
