= Buzz Buzzard =

- Woody Woodpecker character
- First appearance: Wet Blanket Policy (1948)
- Created by: Walter Lantz; Dick Lundy
- Designed by: Walter Lantz Productions
- Voiced by: Lionel Stander (1948–1951); Dick Nelson (1952); Dallas McKennon (1952-1972); John T. Smith (1953–1954); Daws Butler (1964); Mark Hamill (1999–2002); Kevin Michael Richardson (2018–present)
- Years active: 1948–present

In-universe information
- Species: Vulture
- Gender: Male

Buzz Buzzard is an animated character who appeared in several Woody Woodpecker films produced by Walter Lantz Productions.

== History ==
Buzz is an anthropomorphic vulture and scammer who targets Woody Woodpecker with scams meant to deprive him of money or food. In other appearances, Buzz has been a cowboy, a carnival barker, and a soda jerk yet he still remained a royal pain to Woody. For most of Woody's career, Buzz was the primary foil for Woody, bearing roughly the same relationship to that character as Yosemite Sam had to Bugs Bunny in Warner Bros. Animation' Looney Tunes animated shorts, Joker had to Batman in DC, and Bluto to Popeye in the Fleischer and Famous Studios Popeye shorts, both from the same era.

Buzz's first appearance was opposite Woody in 1948's Wet Blanket Policy, the first and only animated short subject to be nominated for the Academy Award for Best Song, at which time he was more or less replacing Wally Walrus as Woody Woodpecker's primary foil. Character actor Lionel Stander provided his voice in the 1940s with Dallas McKennon taking over the role in the 1950s. Buzz would continue to appear in Woody Woodpecker shorts until the mid 1950s, and was eventually replaced as the woodpecker's rival himself by Dapper Denver Dooley (also voiced by McKennon) and later Gabby Gator. Bunco Busters would be Buzz Buzzard's final appearance in a Woody theatrical cartoon until Tumble Weed Greed in 1969, though Buzz continued to make appearances in Lantz comic books and on other licensed merchandise. During the 14-year theatrical hiatus, Buzz made an appearance in the 1964 television special Spook-a-Nanny, but was voiced by Daws Butler.

The character's appearance changed dramatically throughout the years with a vest and five o'clock shadow that disappears, different feather colors, and head feathers that disappeared entirely and reappeared sporadically.

== Buzz Buzzard appearances ==
1. Wet Blanket Policy (August 27, 1948)
2. Wild and Woody! (December 31, 1948)
3. Drooler's Delight (March 25, 1949)
4. Puny Express (January 22, 1951)
5. Slingshot 6 7/8 (July 23, 1951)
6. Destination Meatball (December 24, 1951)
7. Stage Hoax (April 21, 1952)
8. Scalp Treatment (September 18, 1952)
9. The Great Who-Dood-It (October 20, 1952)
10. Buccaneer Woodpecker (April 20, 1953)
11. Operation Sawdust (June 15, 1953)
12. Belle Boys (September 14, 1953)
13. Hypnotic Hick (September 26, 1953)
14. Hot Noon (or 12 O'Clock For Sure) (October 12, 1953)
15. Socko in Morocco (January 18, 1954)
16. Alley to Bali (March 15, 1954)
17. Hot Rod Huckster (July 5, 1954)
18. Real Gone Woody (September 20, 1954)
19. Bunco Busters (November 21, 1955)
20. Spook-a-Nanny (October 10, 1964)
21. Tumble Weed Greed (June 1, 1969)
22. Ship A'hoy Woody (August 1, 1969)
23. Flim Flam Fountain (January 5, 1971)
24. Indian Corn (January 1, 1972)
25. Show Biz Beagle (June 1, 1972)
26. The Genie with the Light Touch (August 1, 1972)

== Other media ==
- Buzz was going to have a cameo in Who Framed Roger Rabbit, but was later dropped for unknown reasons.
- Buzz appears as a regular character on The New Woody Woodpecker Show, voiced by Mark Hamill.
- Buzz appears in the 2018 Woody Woodpecker animated series, voiced by Kevin Michael Richardson. He has a love interest named Veronica.
- Buzz appears in the film Woody Woodpecker Goes to Camp as the main antagonist, voiced again by Kevin Michael Richardson.
- A few video games from Woody Woodpecker also featured Buzz Buzzard:
  - Woody Woodpecker Racing (2000) for PlayStation, Dreamcast, PC and Game Boy Color.
  - Woody Woodpecker: Escape from Buzz Buzzard Park (2001) for Game Boy Color, PC and PlayStation 2.

== See also ==
- Walter Lantz Productions
- List of Walter Lantz cartoon characters
