= Baby-Face Mouse =

- Baby-Face Mouse as seen in The Big Cat And The Little Mousie (art by Walter Lantz Studios)
- First appearance: Cheese-Nappers (1938)
- Last appearance: Snuffy's Party (1939)
- Created by: Walter Lantz; Alex Lovy
- Voiced by: Bernice Hansen (Cheese-Nappers); Margaret Hill-Talbot (1938–1939)

In-universe information
- Species: Mouse
- Gender: Male

Baby-Face Mouse is an animated character created by Walter Lantz, who made his first appearance in the cartoon Cheese-Nappers in 1938. He starred in nine cartoons over two years, with his final appearance in 1939, in Snuffy's Party as a cameo.

== List of appearances ==
- Cheese-Nappers (07/04/1938)
- The Big Cat And The Little Mousie (08/15/1938) - reissued as The Big Cat And The Little Mouse
- The Cat And The Bell (10/03/1938)
- Sailor Mouse (11/07/1938) - reissued as Willie Mouse - Sailor Boy
- The Disobedient Mouse (11/28/1938) - reissued as Baby Face Battler
- I'm Just A Jitterbug (01/23/1939) - sketch in background only
- The Magic Beans (02/13/1939) - Baby-Face Mouse as Beanie
- Little Tough Mice (03/13/1939) - reissued as Crime Buster
- Arabs With Dirty Fezzes (07/31/1939) - reissued as The Arabs With Dirty Fezzes
- Snuffy's Party (08/07/1939) - cameo appearance

== See also ==
- Walter Lantz Productions
- List of Walter Lantz cartoon characters
