= List of Walter Lantz cartoon characters =

The following is a list of cartoon characters produced by Walter Lantz Productions. All of the animal characters listed below are anthropomorphic.

- Woody Woodpecker (1940, woodpecker, friend of Andy)

- Buzz Buzzard (1948, vulture, arch-nemesis of Woody)
- Dapper Denver Dooley (1955, human)
- Duffy Dog (1963, dog)
- Gabby Gator (1960, alligator)
- Ms. Meany (1963, human)
- Professor Dingledong (1955, human)
- Professor Großenfibber (1965, human)
- Splinter & Knothead (1956, woodpeckers, niece and nephew of Woody)
- Wally Walrus (1944, walrus)
- Winnie Woodpecker (1954, woodpecker, girlfriend of Woody)

- Andy Panda (1939, panda, friend of Woody)

- Charlie Chicken (1942, chicken)
- Milo (1945, dog)
- Miranda Panda (1949, panda, girlfriend of Andy)
- Mr. Whippletree (1939, turtle)
- Poppa Panda (1939, panda)

- Baby-Face Mouse (1938, mouse)
- The Beary Family (1962, bears)

- Charlie Beary (Papa)
- Bessie Beary (Mama)
- Junior Beary (son)
- Suzy Beary (daughter)
- Goose (pet goose)

- Chilly Willy (1953, penguin)

- Chilly Lilly (2001, penguin, girlfriend of Willy)
- Gooney the "Gooney Bird" Albatross (1969, albatross)
- Maxie the Polar Bear (1966, polar bear)
- Smedley (1954, dog)

- Doxie Dachshund (1937, dog)
- Doc (1959, cat)

- Cecil (1959, dog)
- Champ (1960, dog)
- Hickory & Dickory (mice)

- Elmer the Great Dane (1935, dog)
- Cuddles the Great Dane (1954, dog)
- Fatso the Bear (1960, bear)
- Hickory & Dickory (1959, mice)

- Cecil (dog)
- Doc (cat)

- Homer Pigeon (1942, pigeon)
- Inspector Willoughby a.k.a. Secret Agent 6 & 7/8 (1958, human)
- Lil' Eightball (1939, human)
- Maggie & Sam (1955, humans)
- Maw and Paw (1953, humans)

- more than a dozen of their kids
- Milford (pet pig)

- Meany, Miny, and Moe (1935, monkeys)
- Oswald the Lucky Rabbit (1929, rabbit; originally a Disney character)
  - Kitty (1930, cat; originally a Disney character, now known as Ortensia the Cat)
  - Pete (1929; originally a Disney character)
- Pepito Chickeeto (1957, chicken, who made his first and only appearance in the cartoon "The Bongo Punch")
- Mr. Percy P. Pettipoint (1954, human)
- Peterkin (1939, mythological faun)
- Pooch the Pup (1932, dog)
- Sam & Simian ("Jungle Medics", 1960, monkeys)
- Space Mouse (1960, mouse)
- Sugarfoot (1954, horse)
- Windy & Breezy (1957, bears)

== See also ==
- Walter Lantz Productions
- Golden age of American animation
