= Merlin the Magic Mouse (film) =

- Lobby card
- Directed by: Alex Lovy
- Story by: Cal Howard
- Produced by: William L. Hendricks
- Starring: Daws Butler
- Edited by: Hal Geer
- Music by: William Lava
- Animation by: Ted Bonnicksen; Laverne Harding; Volus Jones; Ed Solomon
- Layouts by: Robert Givens
- Backgrounds by: Bob Abrams
- Color process: Technicolor
- Production company: Warner Bros.-Seven Arts Animation
- Distributed by: Warner Bros.-Seven Arts; The Vitaphone Corporation
- Release date: November 18, 1967
- Running time: 6:17
- Language: English

Merlin the Magic Mouse is a 1967 Warner Bros.-Seven Arts Merrie Melodies cartoon directed by Alex Lovy. The short was released on November 18, 1967 and features the first appearance of Merlin the Magic Mouse and Second Banana, both voiced by Daws Butler. This cartoon also saw the final appearance of Sam Cat in a Warner Bros. cartoon.

== Plot ==
Merlin puts on a magic show but he is not really popular. Upon their entry into the auditorium, Merlin's sidekick Second Banana counts the house, where he finds only one member of the audience: a cat (Sam Cat). He tells Merlin that there will be trouble if the cat finds out that Merlin's a mouse. Cleverly, Merlin puts on a fake mustache to disguise himself. The curtain rises and, when Merlin introduces himself, the cat boos. Second Banana is instructed to create applause using a machine that has several hands on a wheel.

For his first trick, Merlin decides to pull a live rabbit from his empty hat. When Merlin puts in his hand, the rabbit bites his thumb, which causes it to throb. From the side of the stage, Second Banana tells Merlin to use the carrot. Merlin pulls out the carrot and the rabbit reaches out its paw to grab it, pulling Merlin into the hat along with him, prompting Merlin to say, "I shall have a talk with that rabbit later."

After getting his hat back to normal, Merlin proclaims that, for his next "feat of legerdemain," he will need a volunteer from the crowd. He chooses the cat, who is incredulous, and the cat comes up on stage. Merlin informs him that he is going to saw him in half. While Second Banana retrieves the box, the cat runs away, not wanting to be sawed in half by Merlin. He trips and Merlin grabs him by the tail. Pulling him across the stage, Merlin says to the cat, "Get back here! It's only a trick. Besides, you've got nine lives; what have you got to lose?"

The cat starts crying because he knows what is going to happen. He bawls, "You're gonna hurt my itsy-bitsy body... with a sharp saw... boo-hoo-hoo-hoo-hoo!" Merlin has Second Banana go get the (rubber) saw in the trunk. Second Banana finds trick cards and magic flowers but no rubber saw, so he is forced to give Merlin a real one. Merlin starts sawing the box and Second Banana finally finds the rubber saw. Merlin throws the real one away and he apologizes to the cat. When he bends over, his mustache falls off. The cat says, "Hey! You're a mouse! I hate mouses!" The cat breaks out of the box and goes after the two mice. Merlin calls on some real magic to turn out the lights and, once the lights come back on, the cat is entangled in a locked chain. The cat chomps down on the chain, breaking it. He then goes back to the mice. They stop him and Merlin tells him that they have a gift for him, and he "will get a bang out of it." It is actually a large piece of dynamite. The cat blows out the one fuse, not knowing there is one at the bottom. The fuse ends and it blows up.

Merlin and Second Banana are still trying to run away when they get to a brick wall. Merlin pulls out his Indian trick rope and they climb up it. The cat follows but, once at the top, the mice are nowhere to be found. Merlin says that he should join them down below and he pulls the rope, causing the cat to fall to the ground.

Merlin and Second Banana go out the back door. Merlin pulls out his magic carpet. He says, "Escadido...Atascadero...and all that jazz!" He flies off, but he accidentally leaves Second Banana behind. Noticing the cat is in hot pursuit, Second Banana calls for Merlin to come back to get him. Merlin returns and the two fly off, seemingly leaving the cat behind.

While in the air, Merlin asks Second Banana where their next booking is, which is revealed to be in Peoria. Merlin proclaims, "Peoria, here we come!" The cat, paddling a gravity-defying canoe-like boat suspended by balloons, remarks, "And Peoria, here I come!" Merlin then says, "In that case, we open in Hoboken." He chuckles and the screen fades to black.

== Home media ==
The short is included as an extra on Looney Tunes Mouse Chronicles: The Chuck Jones Collection.
