= Woody Woodpecker: Escape from Buzz Buzzard Park =

2001 video game

- North American PlayStation 2 cover art
- Developers: Eko Software (PC, PS2); Planet Interactive Development (GBC)
- Publishers: EU: Cryo Interactive; NA: DreamCatcher Interactive
- Platforms: Game Boy Color; Windows; PlayStation 2
- Release: Game Boy Color: FRA: June 7, 2001; UK: August 3, 2001; NA: August 14, 2001; Windows: FRA: November 14, 2001; NA: November 20, 2001; PlayStation 2: FRA: November 14, 2001; UK: December 14, 2001; NA: February 19, 2002
- Genre: Platform-adventure
- Mode: Single-player

Woody Woodpecker: Escape from Buzz Buzzard Park is a set of two video games based on the animated series The New Woody Woodpecker Show. One is for PlayStation 2 and Windows, and the other is for the Game Boy Color.

== Synopsis ==
This game occurs in the cartoon universe, and for much of this adventure, the main character is Woody Woodpecker. During Woody's absence, his nephew Knothead and niece Splinter are abducted by Buzz Buzzard, which requires an exorbitant ransom for a release. Instead of paying, Woody searches for his missing nephew and niece in Buzz's dangerous amusement park.

== Gameplay ==
Woody Woodpecker: Escape from Buzz Buzzard Park is an adventure game in the third person, in which the player controls his character in an environment modelled in computer graphics and real-time 3D, with the camera placed behind or around the figure. The game consists of twenty-one levels of type platform. The progress in the game is based primarily on the skill and dexterity needed to overcome obstacles that present themselves (to cross chasms, climb walls) or unblock access to the following level by manipulating objects (Woody sometimes needs use his beak to that effect). Woody should indicate the exact target location before skipping across for a better aim. The game features a battle against Buzz Buzzard's minions, where Woody can use his beak or special attacks to fight. Besides Woody Woodpecker himself, the player can also choose to play Knothead or Splinter once Woody finds one of them.

== Reception ==
Reception

Aggregate scores
Aggregator	Score
GameRankings	57.50% (GBC); 58.67% (PS2)
Metacritic	64/100 (PS2)

The game received a favorable critical reception at its release. The Windows version of the game got an 81 out of 100 of the French magazine Joystick, which they judged "fairly good". Jeuxvideo.com gave 16/20, praising the gameplay, graphics and cartoon atmosphere, but was critical of the game's short length, the small number of different environments and sometimes repetitive music. German critic site Games Mania gave the game 78%, while PC Gameplay gave it a 73 out of 100. The version for PlayStation 2 was also well received: Game Vortex gave it 83%, PGNX Media gave it 80%, and Jeuxvideo.com gave it 15/20. GameZone, by contrast, gave the game a score of 59 out of 100 reproaching the geometric graphics, repetitive music, sometimes annoying camera movements, and level paths being quite linear.
