= Merlin the Magic Mouse =

Warner Bros. theatrical cartoon character

Merlin the Magic Mouse and Second Banana
- Looney Tunes character
- First appearance: Merlin the Magic Mouse (1967)
- Created by: Alex Lovy
- Designed by: Jaime Diaz
- Voiced by: Daws Butler (1967); Larry Storch (1968–1969); J. P. Karliak (2023–present)

In-universe information
- Species: Mouse
- Gender: Male

Merlin the Magic Mouse is an animated cartoon mouse who starred in five Warner Bros. Looney Tunes shorts late in the series, from 1967 to 1969. The first cartoon was Merlin the Magic Mouse, directed by Alex Lovy.

In 1967, Jack L. Warner reorganized the Warner Bros. animation department and hired Lovy away from Hanna-Barbera Productions to create new characters for Warner Bros. The two that Lovy came up with were Merlin the Magic Mouse and Cool Cat.

== History ==
Merlin was a nightclub magician (he usually preferred to be called a prestidigitator, though he could never pronounce this correctly) who traveled around for work. Much of the humor of the character derived from the fact that, while he was often regarded as a cheap stage magician, he knew some very real and powerful magic tricks. His magic words were typically "Atascadero Escondido!" Merlin also has a sidekick, appropriately named Second Banana, which is a slang term for a magician's assistant.

Daws Butler provided the voice of Merlin and Second Banana in the first short, Merlin the Magic Mouse; Larry Storch performed their voices for the other four films. Merlin's vocal mannerisms are based on that of W.C. Fields.

He was featured in Tiny Toons Looniversity, voiced by J. P. Karliak. He appears in the episode "Extra, So Extra", serving as the mentor of Buster Bunny.

== Starring shorts ==
- Merlin the Magic Mouse (1967)
- Hocus Pocus Pow Wow (1968)
- Feud with a Dude (1968)
- Fistic Mystic (1969)
- Shamrock and Roll (1969)
