= Inspector Willoughby =

Fictional character

- First appearance: Salmon Yeggs (1958) (as Willoughby); Rough and Tumbleweed (1961) (as Inspector Willoughby)
- Last appearance: The Case of the Elephant's Trunk (1965)
- Created by: Walter Lantz; Paul J. Smith
- Adapted by: Walter Lantz Productions
- Voiced by: Daws Butler (1958–1960); Dallas McKennon (1959–1965)

In-universe information
- Alias: Inspector Seward Willoughby
- Nickname: Secret Agent 6 7/8
- Species: Human
- Gender: Male
- Occupation: Secret agent

Inspector Seward Willoughby is a cartoon character created by Walter Lantz and Paul J. Smith, named after the Hollywood avenue which runs alongside the building where Lantz's office was housed (at 861 Seward Street).

Initially created as a recurring secondary character, Willoughby starred in his own series of shorts with him as a crime fighting secret agent. His cartoons were often shown on The Woody Woodpecker Show alongside Woody Woodpecker, Chilly Willy and Andy Panda.

== Biography ==
Inspector Willoughby (AKA Secret Agent 6 7/8) initially made his first appearance in the 1958 Windy & Breezy cartoon Salmon Yeggs as a cannery security guard. He would serve as a recurring character for several more cartoons with Windy & Breezy, as well as with Woody Woodpecker and Fatso the Bear, before receiving his own series in 1961.

The Inspector Willoughby series mainly focuses on Willoughby as a secret agent who solves mysteries and fights crime. He is characterized with droopy eyes, a bushy mustache, and laconic voice. He was very similar to Tex Avery's Droopy in voice and stature. When on the job, he always goes after any villains which ends with them behind bars. Despite his diminutive height, he is able to physically restrain and use impressive judo moves on men twice his size. It was established in the cartoon short "Mississippi Slow Boat" that his first name is Seward.

== Filmography ==
=== Windy and Breezy shorts ===
- Salmon Yeggs (1958)
- Truant Student (1959)
- Bee Bopped (1959) (as a bee)

=== Woody Woodpecker shorts ===
- Tomcat Combat (1959)
- Kiddie League (1959)

=== Fatso The Bear shorts ===
- Hunger Strife (1960)
- Eggnapper (1961)

=== Inspector Willoughby shorts ===
- Rough and Tumbleweed (1961)
- Mississippi Slow Boat (1961)
- The Case of the Red-Eyed Ruby (1961)
- Phoney Express (1962)
- Hyde and Sneak (1962)
- Coming Out Party (1963)
- Case of the Cold Storage Yegg (1963)
- Hi-Seas Hi-Jacker (1963)
- The Case of the Maltese Chicken (1964)
- The Case of the Elephant's Trunk (1965)
