= Hickory, Dickory, and Doc =

- Screenshot from Space Mouse (1959)
- First appearance: Space Mouse (September 7, 1959)
- Created by: Alex Lovy
- Voiced by: Paul Frees (Doc); Grace Stafford (Hickory); Dallas McKennon (Dickory)
- Developed by: Jack Hannah

In-universe information
- Full name: Dynamo Doc (Doc)
- Species: Anthropomorphic mice and cat

Hickory, Dickory, and Doc are fictional cartoon characters created by Alex Lovy for Walter Lantz Productions. Lovy would feature the trio in three cartoons until his departure in 1960. Jack Hannah would later feature Doc in six solo cartoons soon afterwards.

== History ==
Alex Lovy first introduced Hickory, Dickory, and Doc in the 1959 cartoon Space Mouse, in which Doc attempts to sell the mice to NASA as test animals. Lovy's shorts mainly follow the contemporary cat-and-mouse chase formula of the time, with Doc usually failing to catch the more cunning Hickory and Dickory. These cartoons also featured the bulldog character Cecil, who often beats up Doc whenever he falls victim to his failed chases.

Lovy would eventually leave Lantz for Hanna-Barbera in 1960, with his role of director soon taken by Jack Hannah. Hannah would continue to use Doc in six more cartoons without Hickory and Dickory, instead pairing him with a loyal bulldog companion named Champ. Hannah's shorts put much more emphasis on Doc's city life, as he schemes with Champ to find ways to make a quick buck. Doc and Champ lastly appeared in Corny Concerto (1962) before they were retired.

Three of the cartoons, "Mouse Trapped" (Hickory, Dickory, and Doc), "Pest Of Show" and "Doc's Last Stand" (Doc and Champ) were released as 8mm and 16mm home film editions by Castle Films with the star character renamed Dynamo Doc.

== Filmography ==
No.	Title	Directed by	Written by	Original release date	Prod. code
1	"Space Mouse"	Alex Lovy	Homer Brightman	September 7, 1959	U-103
Doc attempts to capture and sell two mice, Hickory and Dickory, to NASA for laboratory tests. Note: First appearance of Hickory, Dickory, and Doc.
2	"Mouse Trapped"	Alex Lovy	Homer Brightman	December 8, 1959	U-104
Today on Friday the 13th, the mayor and the police commissioner have proclaimed all black cats a menace to the city's safety and are having them apprehended, including Doc.
3	"Witty Kitty"	Alex Lovy	Homer Brightman	February 2, 1960	U-106
Two hungry alley cats set up a raffle to con Doc into snatching a turkey from a house watchdog named Cecil. Doc makes a number of unsuccessful attempts to get past Cecil, and Hickory and Dickory only complicate matters. Note: Final appearance of Hickory, Dickory and Cecil.
4	"Freeloading Feline"	Jack Hannah	Jack Hannah	September 7, 1960	U-116
Doc and Champ trick their way into a penthouse party, where Champ is mistaken for a staff member and prevents Doc from freeloading his way in. The battle between Doc and Champ ultimately leaves the party a shambles. Notes: First appearance of Champ.; Available on "Woody Woodpecker and Friends", Vol. 11 (DVD; Columbia House Club, July 2004).
5	"Tin Can Concert Presents: The Cinderella Overture by Rossini"	Jack Hannah	Jack Hannah	October 31, 1961	U-137
Doc conducts an all-cat symphony orchestra in a rendition of Gioachino Rossini's Cinderella Overture, all the while disturbing a mouse inside the grandfather clock Doc is using a podium. Note: Champ does not appear in this episode.
6	"Doc's Last Stand"	Jack Hannah	Al Bertino and Dick Kinney	December 19, 1961	U-139
Doc and Champ travel across the Wild West to do some sales business, but Doc has Champ dress up as a lady to satisfy a love-crazed customer. Note: Available on "Woody Woodpecker and Friends", Vol. 7 (DVD; Columbia House Club, October 2003).
7	"Pest Of Show"	Jack Hannah	Frank Priest	February 13, 1962	U-143
Doc prepares Champ for the upcoming dog show that offers a $50,000 prize and a banquet to the winner. Champ wins the prize but Doc ruins his entire banquet. Note: Available on "Woody Woodpecker and Friends", Vol. 14 (DVD; Columbia House Club, Autumn 2004) and "Woody Woodpecker Favorites" (DVD; Universal, 03/10/2009).
8	"Punchy Pooch"	Jack Hannah	Bill Danch	September 4, 1962	U-145
At a carnival, Doc enters Champ in a boxing match against "The Australian Bounder", a fighting kangaroo. Doc and Champ find out that the kangaroo and his manager don't fight fair. Notes: A.K.A. "Punch Pooch" or "Pouchy Pooch".; Available on "Woody Woodpecker and Friends", Vol. 12 (DVD; Columbia House Club, Summer 2004).
9	"Corny Concerto"	Jack Hannah	Dave Detiege	October 30, 1962	U-157
Doc and Champ are offered a foot whacking part in a club. Champ becomes a star until he finally won't take it anymore and makes Doc the star instead. Notes: Available on "Woody Woodpecker and Friends", Vol. 14 (DVD; Columbia House Club, Autumn 2004).; Final appearance of Doc and Champ.

== See also ==
- Walter Lantz Productions
- List of Walter Lantz cartoon characters
