= Maw and Paw =

American animated film characters by Walter Lantz

- Maw and Paw (art by Walter Lantz Studios)
- First appearance: "Maw and Paw"; 1953
- Last appearance: "Feudin Fightin-N-Fussin"; 1968
- Created by: Walter Lantz Productions

Maw and Paw are animated characters created by Walter Lantz, who made their first appearance in the cartoon "Maw and Paw" in 1953. Their final appearance was in 1968, in "Feudin Fightin-N-Fussin". They are based on the Universal's popular live-action Ma and Pa Kettle film series.

== Overview ==
Maw (Grace Stafford) and Paw (Dal McKennon) are a married couple who live with their children and dog in a rural part of the US. Their pet pig Milford appears to be the most educated and therefore the brightest in the family.

A well-known running gag in the cartoons involves Paw stepping on a loose lumber of their house, causing his nose to get stuck in the hole of that wood as it flips. His eldest son would try to help him by punching his nose.

Paw is naïve and occasionally absent-minded. This naïveté sometimes results in him getting knocked out by his wife.

== List of cartoons ==
List of appearances:

- "Maw And Paw" (08/10/1953) - later released on the DVD Woody Woodpecker and Friends volume 2.
- "Plywood Panic" (09/28/1953)
- "Pig In A Pickle" (08/30/1954) - later reissued by Castle Films as "The Piggy That Stayed Home"
- "Paw's Night Out" (08/01/1955) - this cartoon appeared in the music video for Bamboo's Bamboogie. Later reissued by Castle Films as "Piggy's Dizzy Nite".
- "Feudin Fightin-N-Fussin" (1968)

== Other characters ==
"The Kids"

"Milford" The Smart One

== See also ==
- Walter Lantz Productions
- List of Walter Lantz cartoon characters
