= Wet Blanket Policy =

- Directed by: Dick Lundy
- Story by: Ben Hardaway; Heck Allen
- Produced by: Walter Lantz
- Starring: Lionel Stander; Ben Hardaway
- Music by: Darrell Calker
- Animation by: Les Kline; Ken O'Brien; Laverne Harding (unc.); Fred Moore (unc.); Ed Love (unc.); Pat Matthews (unc.); Sid Pillet (unc.)
- Backgrounds by: Fred Brunish
- Color process: Technicolor
- Production company: Walter Lantz Productions
- Distributed by: United Artists
- Release date: August 27, 1948
- Running time: 6:24
- Language: English

Wet Blanket Policy is a 1948 Woody Woodpecker "cartune" directed by Dick Lundy. Released theatrically on August 27, 1948, the film was produced by Walter Lantz Productions and distributed by United Artists. The cartoon is noted for being the first appearance of Buzz Buzzard, and the film would later be reissued by Universal International, Lantz's former distributor.

The title is a play-on-words about a type of insurance policy.

== Plot ==
At his insurance office, confidence man Buzz Buzzard is looking for a fresh sucker to swindle. Looking off in the distance, Buzz sees a happy-go-lucky Woody Woodpecker, minding his own business while whistling down the street. The cunning buzzard quickly greases the sidewalk, causing Woody to slide directly through the front door.

Buzz tries to convince Woody that he needs an insurance policy. Buzz tells Woody that "one never knows when a little accident might prove fatal". Woody is then bamboozled into signing a policy, with the fine print clearly stating that it will pay Buzz $10,000 in case of accidental death. Woody soon realizes what is going on and challenges him to try to carry out his plan, mocking him by saying "If you think you're going to bump ME off and collect $10,000...you're crazy! Anytime you can get $10,000 from me, it'll be over my dead body, you dirty crook!"

Buzz then tries his best to kill Woody so he can collect, resulting in a battle of wits between them, only to have the tables turned on him when Woody knocks him into a pit full of alligators. As Buzz flees from his attackers (Woody and the gators), screaming into the distance, Woody laughs and tears up the policy.

== Production notes ==
Wet Blanket Policy is the first cartoon to introduce Woody's new theme song, "The Woody Woodpecker Song". Written by George Tibbles and Ramey Idriss, the song was performed by Kay Kyser, with Gloria Wood providing vocals and Harry Babbitt chiming in with Woody's trademark laugh. The song was a smash hit, selling over 250,000 records within ten days of its release. Cashing in on the unexpected popularity, Walter Lantz hastily inserted the tune into Wet Blanket Policy, his latest film in production at the time (which explains why the action and music do not match up for the first minute of the film). As a result of including "The Woody Woodpecker Song" in Wet Blanket Policy, the song became the first and only tune from an animated short subject to be nominated for the Academy Award for Best Original Song, losing the award to "Buttons and Bows" from The Paleface. Lantz adopted the song as Woody's theme music from then on.

The cartoon also prominently featured Woody's new adversary, Buzz Buzzard. Buzz proved to be a more popular foil for Woody than Wally Walrus, who appeared less frequently in Woody cartoons after this film. Buzz would appear regularly with Woody until 1955's Bunco Busters, when he was replaced by Dapper Denver Dooley (who debuted in 1955's Square Shootin' Square and used until 1959's The Tee Bird), Gabby Gator (who debuted in 1960's Southern Fried Hospitality and appeared recurrently until 1963's Greedy Gabby Gator), and Ms. Meany (who debuted in 1963's Calling Dr. Woodpecker and stayed throughout the rest of the shorts' run) as Woody's main antagonist in the series; Buzz would only reappear ten years after Dooley's final appearance, in 1969's Tumble Weed Greed.

Lionel Stander provided the voice of Buzz Buzzard for his earliest appearances. When Stander was blacklisted in 1951, Dal McKennon stepped in as Buzz as well as Wally and Dooley.
