= Meany, Miny, and Moe =

- Meany, Miny, and Moe as seen in The Golfers
- First appearance: Monkey Wretches (1935)
- Last appearance: The Air Express (1937)
- Created by: Walter Lantz
- Voiced by: Mel Blanc (The Stevedores; drunk singing); Danny Webb (Ostrich Feathers; explorer voice)

In-universe information
- Species: Monkeys
- Gender: Males

Meany, Miny, and Moe are animated characters created by Walter Lantz, who made their first appearance in the Oswald the Lucky Rabbit cartoon Monkey Wretches (1935). Their final animated appearance was in 1937 in The Air Express.

== Personalities and development ==
According to their theme song, the trio are "just three monkeys from the sticks / just a bunch of jungle hicks / but they know a lot of tricks". At first portrayed as unclothed identical triplets in the Oswald cartoons, the monkeys began wearing clothes and behaving individually when they graduated to their own series. Meany is a wannabe tough guy, often bullying his shyer, clumsier brothers. In animation, the trio rarely speak coherent English, instead rapidly gibbering in an imitation of real-life monkeys.

While usually depicted as monkeys with tails, the three brothers are occasionally drawn tailless, making them look more like chimpanzees.

== List of appearances ==
No.	Title	Release date	Notes
N/A.	"Monkey Wretches"	November 11, 1935	In an Oswald the Lucky Rabbit cartoon. The first appearance of Meany, Miney and Moe.
N/A.	"Beauty Shoppe"	March 30, 1936	In an Oswald the Lucky Rabbit cartoon
N/A.	"Farming Fools"	May 25, 1936	In an Oswald the Lucky Rabbit cartoon
N/A.	"Battle Royal"	June 22, 1936	In an Oswald the Lucky Rabbit cartoon
1	"Turkey Dinner"	November 30, 1936	The first Meany, Miny and Moe cartoon
2	"Knights For The Day"	December 25, 1936	
3	"The Golfers"	January 11, 1937	
4	"House Of Magic"	February 8, 1937	
5	"The Big Race"	March 8, 1937	
6	"The Lumber Camp"	March 15, 1937	
7	"The Steel Workers"	April 26, 1937	
8	"The Stevedores"	May 24, 1937	The first cartoon that the characters speak.
9	"The Country Store"	July 5, 1937	
10	"Firemen's Picnic"	August 16, 1937	
11	"The Rest Resort"	August 23, 1937	
12	"Ostrich Feathers"	September 6, 1937	
13	"The Air Express"	September 20, 1937	The last Meany, Miny, and Moe cartoon. The last appearance of Meany, Miney and Moe.

== Comic appearances ==
In the later Lantz comic books Woody Woodpecker Back to School #1 and 2 (1952–53), the three monkeys starred in comic stories of their own. The spelling of their names changed to Meeny, Miney and (sometimes) Mo. In the comics, the trio spoke English in a style roughly mimicking the Three Stooges. While Meeny's name no longer exactly matched the word "meany", he was still portrayed as a wannabe tough guy.

== See also ==
- Walter Lantz Productions
- List of Walter Lantz cartoon characters
