= The Beary Family =

- Charlie and Bessie Beary as seen in "Cool It Charlie"
- First appearance: Fowled-Up Birthday (1962)
- Last appearance: Unlucky Potluck (1972)
- Created by: Jack Hannah; Walter Lantz
- Voiced by: Paul Frees; Grace Stafford; Nancy Wible
- Members: Charlie Beary (Papa); Bessie Beary (Mama); Junior Beary (son); Suzy Beary (daughter)
- No. of shorts: 28

In-universe information
- Race: Grizzly bears
- Gender: Male (Charlie and Junior); Female (Bessie and Suzy)
- Family: Granny Beary (Bessie's Mother)
- Significant other: Pete (Charlie's Friend)

The Beary Family (also known as The Beary's Family Album) is an American animated and cartoon animal theatrical series created by Jack Hannah for Walter Lantz Productions. Twenty-eight shorts were made from 1962 to 1972, when the studio closed.

== History ==
Suzy and Junior in "Fowled-Up Birthday"

The series focused on Charlie Beary, the incompetent and stubborn family man, his nagging wife Bessie, their mischievous but slightly dim-witted teenage son Junior and their younger well-meaning, innocent daughter Suzy, who later got a pet named Goose Beary, who never gets along with Charlie. Jack Hannah initially conceived the series based on a family of five (four family members and a pet), but Hannah would later leave the studio after directing the first two shorts. When Paul J. Smith became the series primary director, the concept would be significantly redeveloped. Suzy and Goose Beary would be phased out to focus more on the dynamic between Charlie and Junior. Bessie would also received a redesign in Rah Rah Ruckus (1964) and portrayed more as a nagging housewife who chastises Charlie over his mistakes. Smith would continue the series until 1972, when the studio closed.

Critics have since called the series dry and witless under Smith's direction. Animation historian Jerry Beck included the series in a list of TV cartoons that should be forgotten on Cartoon Research, citing its "ugly" art, and "corny" verbal gags and visuals.

== Voice actors ==
- Paul Frees – Charlie Beary, Junior Beary, and Goose Beary
- Grace Stafford – Bessie and Suzy Beary
- Nancy Wible – Suzy Beary ("Fowled-Up Birthday")

== Filmography ==
- Fowled-Up Birthday (1962)
- Mother's Little Helper (1962)
- Charlie's Mother-In-Law (1963)
- Goose in the Rough (1963)
- Goose is Wild (1963)
- Rah Rah Ruckus (1964)
- Roof Top Razzle-Dazzle (1964)
- Guest Who? (1965)
- Davey Cricket (1965)
- Foot Brawl (1966), www.bcdb.com
- Window Pains (1967)
- Mouse in the House (1967)
- Jerky Turkey (1968)
- Paste Makes Waste (1968)
- Bugged in a Rug (1968)
- Gopher Broke (1969)
- Charlie's Campout (1969)
- Cool it Charlie (1969)
- Charlie in Hot Water (1970)
- Charlie's Golf Classic (1970)
- The Unhandy Man (1970)
- Charlie the Rain Maker (1971)
- The Bungling Builder (1971)
- Moochin Pooch (1971)
- Let Charlie Do It (1972)
- A Fish Story (1972)
- Rain, Rain, Go Away (1972)
- Unlucky Potluck (1972)

== See also ==
- Walter Lantz Productions
- List of Walter Lantz cartoon characters
