= Windy & Breezy =

- Windy & Breezy (art by Walter Lantz Studios)

Character information
- First app.: "Fodder and Son" (1957)
- Last app.: "Bee Bopped" (1959)
- Created by: Walter Lantz Productions

Windy & Breezy are animated characters created by Walter Lantz, who made their first appearance in the cartoon "Fodder and Son" in 1957. Their final appearance was in 1959, in "Bee Bopped".

== List of appearances ==
- "Fodder and Son" (11/4/1957)
- "Salmon Yeggs" (03/24/1958)
- "Three Ring Fling" (10/06/1958)
- "Truant Student" (01/05/1959)
- "Bee Bopped" (06/15/1959)

== See also ==
- Walter Lantz Productions
- List of Walter Lantz cartoon characters
