= Lil' Eightball =

- Lil' Eightball, as seen in "A Haunting We Will Go" (art by Walter Lantz Studios).
- First appearance: The Stubborn Mule (1939)
- Last appearance: A Haunting We Will Go (1939)
- Created by: Burt Gillett & Walter Lantz
- Adapted by: Walter Lantz Productions
- Designed by: Walter Lantz
- Voiced by: Mel Blanc

In-universe information
- Species: Human
- Gender: Male

Silly Superstition (1939)

Lil' Eightball is a Walter Lantz character voiced by Mel Blanc who made his first appearance in the cartoon "The Stubborn Mule" in 1939. His final appearance was in 1939, in "A Haunting We Will Go". A comic strip starring the character was canceled for racial discrimination.

"A Haunting We Will Go" is the first Walter Lantz cartoon made in three-strip Technicolor. From this point onward, all of the Lantz cartoons would be produced in color.

== Film appearances ==
- "The Stubborn Mule" (July 3, 1939)
- "Silly Superstition" (August 28, 1939)
- "A Haunting We Will Go" (September 4, 1939)

== Comic books ==
Lil' Eightball first appeared in comic books in Dell Comics' The Funnies issue #64 (May 1942), appearing on both the cover and in a story inside. Lil' Eightball then appeared in Lantz's monthly anthology comic book New Funnies starting with issue #65 (July 1942).

Responding to pressure from the African American community, the character was dropped from New Funnies. The last appearance of the character was in issue #126, the August 1947 issue.

== Reception ==
Responding in 1947 to a group of eight-year-old schoolchildren who had complained about the character, Dell's managing editor Oskar Lebeck wrote:

Dear Boys and Girls:
Aren't you a little unfair to imply that our editors discriminated against the colored people in our Li'l Eight Ball stories? I can assure all of you it was not our intention to make fun of the Negroes as you put it in your letter. If you were right, wouldn't we also discriminate against all the white children when we caricature boys and girls, such as in our Little Lulu strips or Henry or many others? Should we leave out the Irish cop or the funny Italian organ-grinder or the fat German delicatessen man, etc., etc.?
However, in order that there should be no doubt in anyone's mind, I have decided to discontinue the Li'l Eight Ball stories effective with the September issue. We certainly do not want, in these troubled times, to add anything which might cause friction and hamper the efforts to build a happy and peaceful world.

== See also ==
- Walter Lantz Productions
- List of Walter Lantz cartoon characters
