= Fuller Pep =

Fuller Pep was a series of animated cartoon films produced in 1916 and 1917 by Pat Powers Productions. Nine films were made. They appear to have been lost.

Six motion pictures in the series were copyrighted in 1917.

The film was shown as part of a supporting program accompanying feature films. The films were distributed in Britain.

Animator F. M. Follett (Foster M. Follett) made the films. He is also credited with other animated shorts including the Quacky Doodles films. Quacky Doodles was created by Johnny Gruelle and the film adaptations were produced by Bray Productions.

== Filmography ==
- Mr. Fuller Pep - He Tries Mesmerism (1916)
- Mr. Fuller Pep - He Dabbles In The Pond (1916)
- Mr. Fuller Pep - He Breaks For The Beach (1916)
- Mr. Fuller Pep - He Celebrates His Wedding Anniversary (1917)
- Mr. Fuller Pep - He Goes To The Country (1917)
- Mr. Fuller Pep - His Wife Goes For A Rest (1917)
- Mr. Fuller Pep - He Does Some Quick Moving (1917)
- Mr. Fuller Pep - His Days Of Rest (1917)
- Mr. Fuller Pep - An Old Bird Pays Him A Visit (1917)
