= Misguided Missile =

Misguided Missile may refer to:

- A misguided missile, see Missile guidance
- Misguided Missile, an animated cartoon featuring Woody Woodpecker, see Woody Woodpecker filmography
- "Misguided Missile", a song by Manic Street Preachers from Futurology
