= Fatso the Bear =

Fictional character

Fatso The Bear
- Fatso in "The Bear and the Bees"
- First appearance: Hunger Strife (October 5, 1960)
- Last appearance: The Bear and the Bees (May 1, 1961)
- Created by: Jack Hannah
- Voiced by: Daws Butler (1960); Dallas McKennon (1961)

In-universe information
- Species: Grizzly bear
- Gender: Male

Fatso the Bear is an animated character created by Jack Hannah for Walter Lantz Productions. He made his first appearance in the cartoon "Hunger Strife" in 1960, and last appeared in "The Bear and the Bees" in 1961.

The bear is essentially a "clone" of Walt Disney's Humphrey the Bear, in terms of physical appearance, gruff voice, and personality. Hannah also co-created Humphrey, and had directed most of the Donald Duck and Humphrey cartoons at Disney back in the mid-1940s into the 1950s.

== Filmography ==
- "Hunger Strife" (October 5, 1960)
- "Eggnapper" (February 14, 1961)
- "The Bear and the Bees" (May 1, 1961)

== See also ==
- Walter Lantz Productions
- List of Walter Lantz cartoon characters
