= Walter Lantz =

American animator (1899–1994)

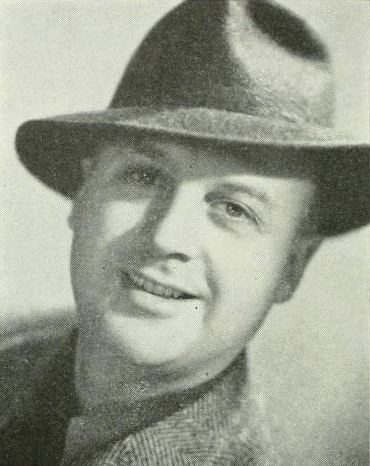
- Lantz in 1939
- Born: Walter Benjamin Lantz; April 27, 1899; New Rochelle, New York, U.S.
- Died: March 22, 1994 (aged 94); Burbank, California, U.S.
- Resting place: Forest Lawn Memorial Park (Hollywood Hills)
- Other name: Walt Lantz
- Occupations: Animator; producer; director; screenwriter
- Years active: 1912–1972
- Employer: Walter Lantz Productions
- Notable work: Woody Woodpecker; Chilly Willy; Oswald the Lucky Rabbit; Andy Panda
- Television: The Woody Woodpecker Show (1957–1958)
- Spouses: Doris Hollister (m. 1930; div. 1940) Grace Stafford (m. 1940; died 1992)
- Relatives: Michael Lantz (brother)
- Awards: Academy Honorary Award; 1979 Lifetime Achievement; Winsor McCay Award; 1973 Lifetime Achievement

Signature
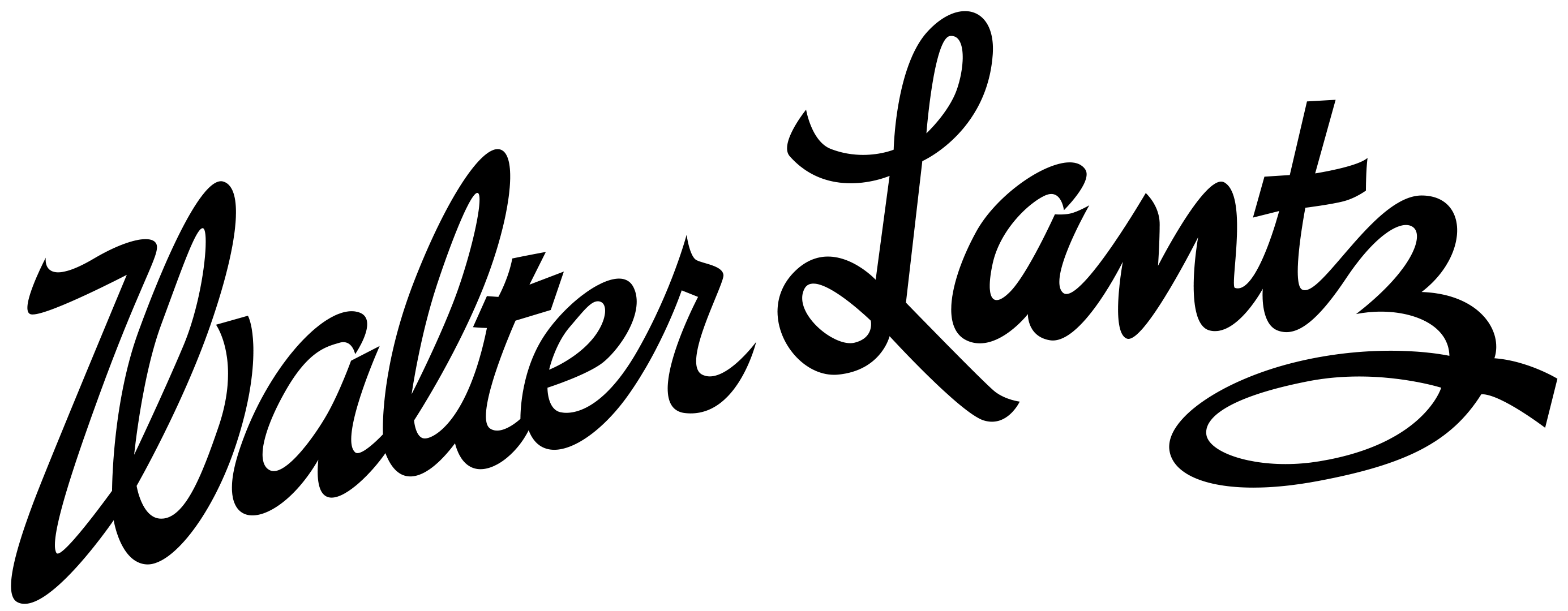

Walter Benjamin Lantz (April 27, 1899 – March 22, 1994) was an American cartoonist, animator, producer and director best known for founding Walter Lantz Productions and creating Woody Woodpecker.

== Biography ==
=== Early years and start in animation ===
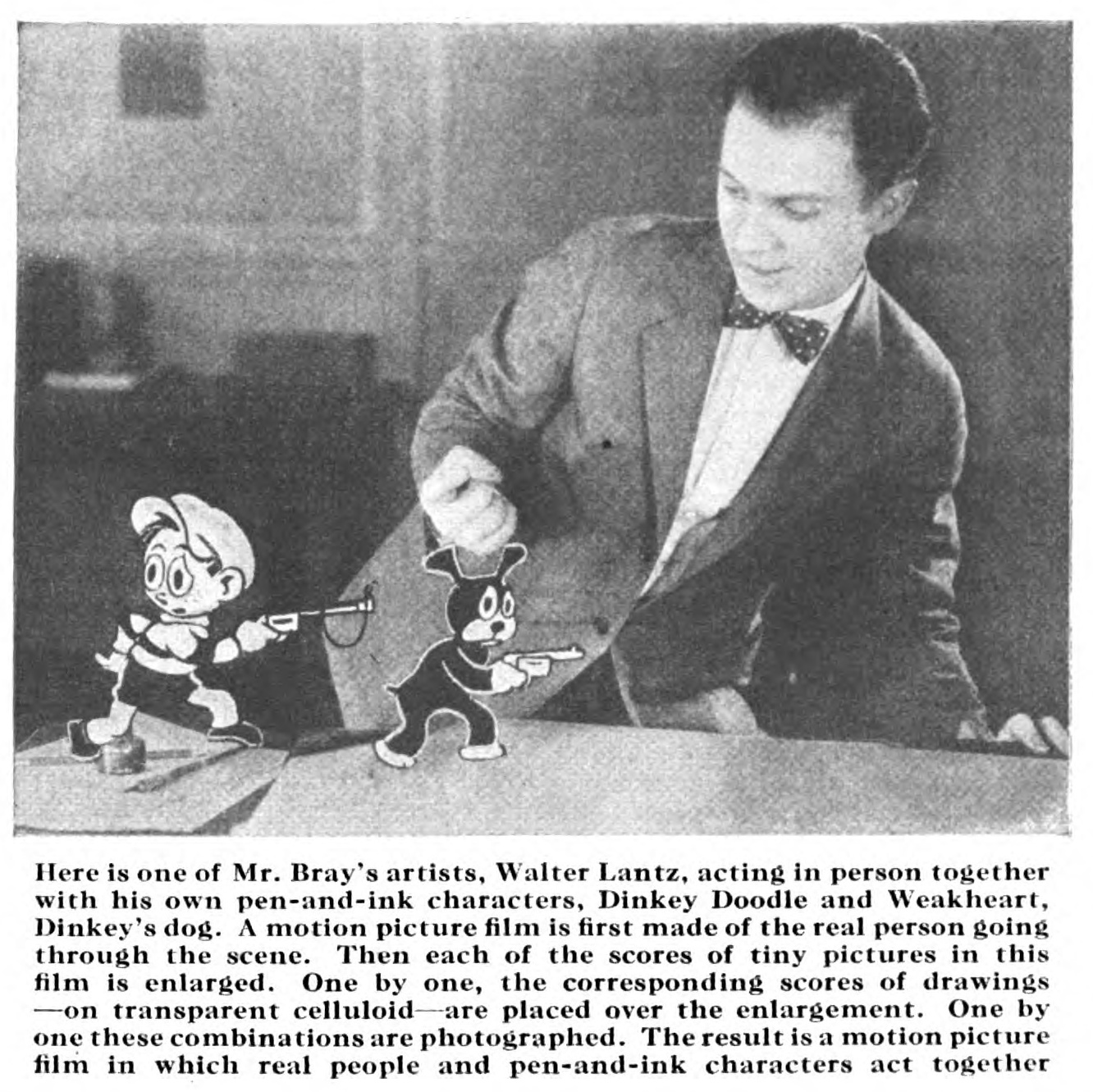
Lantz in the January 1925 edition of The American Magazine

Lantz was born on April 27, 1899, in New Rochelle, New York, to Italian immigrant parents Francesco Paolo Lantz (formerly Lanza) from Castiglione Cosentino, Italy and Maria Gervasi (changed to Jarvis to avoid prejudice) from Calitri. Walter's father ran a grocery. His mother, Maria, died while giving birth to Walter's younger brother, Michael Lantz. Walter's father, Francesco, soon became physically incapacitated leaving Walter to run the grocery store at a young age. According to Joe Adamson's biography The Walter Lantz Story, Lantz's father was given his new surname by an immigration official who anglicized it. Walter Lantz was always interested in art, completing a mail-order drawing class at age 12. He was inspired when he saw Winsor McCay's animated short Gertie the Dinosaur.

While working as an auto mechanic, Lantz got his first break. Wealthy customer Fred Kafka liked his drawings on the garage's bulletin board and financed Lantz's studies at the Art Students League of New York. Kafka also helped him land a job as a copy boy at the New York American, owned by William Randolph Hearst. Lantz worked at the newspaper and attended art school at night.

By the age of 16, Lantz was working in the animation department of International Film Service studio under director Gregory La Cava. Lantz then worked at the John R. Bray Studios on the Jerry on the Job series. In 1924, Lantz directed, animated and even starred in his first cartoon series "Dinky Doodle", which included the popular fairy tale animated shorts Cinderella (1925) and Little Red Riding Hood (1925). Lantz soon replaced George "Vernon" Stallings as head of production at Bray in 1924. At the urging of his friend Robert G. Vignola, Lantz moved to Hollywood, California, after Bray switched to a publicity film studio in 1927, where he attempted to set up his own cartoon studio with Pinto Colvig, but their sound cartoons never got produced. In the meantime, he worked briefly for director Frank Capra and was a gag writer for Mack Sennett comedies. He also resorted to odd jobs, one of them being a chauffeur.

=== The Oswald era ===
In 1928, Lantz was hired by Charles B. Mintz as a replacement of Walt Disney to direct and produce Disney's Oswald the Lucky Rabbit cartoon series for Universal Pictures. Earlier that year, Mintz and his brother-in-law George Winkler had succeeded in getting several animators from the Walt Disney Studio to work for their own studio instead. Universal president Carl Laemmle grew dissatisfied with the Mintz-Winkler product and fired them, deciding instead to produce the Oswalds on the Universal lot. While schmoozing with Laemmle, Lantz wagered that if he could beat Laemmle in a game of poker, the character would be his. As fate would have it, Lantz won the bet and acquired the rights to Oswald and related characters including Pete. Despite this, Walt Disney reacted positively to Lantz's takeover of the series, with the two Walts forming a friendly rivalry that lasted until Disney's death.

Lantz inherited many of his initial staff, including animator Tom Palmer and musician Bert Fiske from the Winkler studio, but importantly he chose fellow New York animator Bill Nolan to help develop the series. Nolan's previous credentials included inventing the panorama background and developing a new, streamlined "Felix the Cat". Nolan was (and still is) best known for perfecting the "rubber hose" style of animation. In September 1929, Lantz released his first cartoon, "Race Riot".

The character went to Lantz's operation in 1933.

By 1935, he parted company with Nolan. Lantz became an independent producer, supplying cartoons to Universal instead of merely overseeing the animation department. By 1940, he was negotiating ownership for the characters with whom he had been working.

=== The Woody Woodpecker era ===
When Oswald's popularity dwindled due to the success of Walt Disney's Mickey Mouse series, Lantz needed a new character. Lantz and his staff conceptualized the characters Meany, Miny and Moe (three ne'er-do-well chimps), Baby-Face Mouse, Snuffy Skunk, Doxie the dachshund, and Jock and Jill (monkeys that resembled Bosko). One character, Andy Panda, stood out and soon became Lantz's headline star for the 1939–1940 production season.

Woody Woodpecker made his first appearance in an Andy Panda short entitled Knock Knock on November 25, 1940. 3 months earlier on August 28, 1940, Lantz married actress Grace Stafford in Reno, Nevada. According to Lantz himself, he came up with the character during his honeymoon at a ranch nearby. He and Stafford kept hearing a woodpecker incessantly pecking on their roof. Grace suggested that Walter use the bird for inspiration as a cartoon character. Taking her advice, though a bit skeptical, Lantz created the brash woodpecker character, similar to the early Daffy Duck. Woody Woodpecker became an instant hit and got his own series during 1941.

Lantz claimed that Alex Lovy created the original design for Woody, although many animators at the studio agreed that Ben Hardaway, who liked screwball characters (with him creating the preliminary version of Bugs Bunny), drew the original design. Hardaway showed a prototype drawing of Woody to voice actor Mel Blanc, asking what he thought of it, to which he jokingly responded "Ugliest damn thing I ever saw". The design was not used in the final cartoon. Blanc wrote the following in his autobiography That's Not All Folks: "The original Woody was repulsive with a capital R: He had a peaked head topped with a sharply angled comb that looked like it had been styled in a wind tunnel. A narrow beak so long, its pointy tip was a zip code away. Short, swollen arms and legs. In all, a sorry spectacle."

Mel Blanc supplied Woody's voice for the first four cartoons. When Blanc accepted a full-time contract with Warner Bros., he was replaced as Woody's voice by Danny Webb, who only partially voiced the character in Pantry Panic, which contains some spoken lines Blanc had recorded prior to leaving Lantz, before Webb himself was replaced by Kent Rogers. After Rogers went into the service due to World War II, Dick Nelson voiced Woody in 1943's Ration Bored before gagman Ben Hardaway, the man who was the main force behind Knock Knock, became the bird's voice the following year, starting with The Barber of Seville. Despite this, Blanc's distinctive laugh was still used throughout the cartoons until 1951.

In 1948, the Lantz studio created a hit Academy Award-nominated song titled "The Woody Woodpecker Song", featuring Blanc's laugh. The song was featured in the film Wet Blanket Policy. Mel Blanc sued Lantz for half a million dollars, claiming that Lantz had used his voice in later cartoons without permission. The judge ruled for Lantz, saying that Blanc had failed to copyright his voice or his contributions. Though Lantz won the case, he paid Blanc in an out-of-court settlement when Blanc filed an appeal, and Lantz began searching for a new voice for Woody Woodpecker.

In 1950, Lantz held anonymous auditions. Grace, Lantz's wife, offered to do Woody's voice, but Lantz turned her down because Woody was a male character. Not discouraged in the least, Grace made her own anonymous audition tape and submitted it to the studio. Not knowing who was behind the voice, Lantz chose Grace's voice for Woody Woodpecker. Grace supplied Woody's voice until the end of production in 1972 and also performed in non-Woody cartoons. At first, Grace voiced Woody without screen credit, thinking that it would disappoint viewers both young and old to know that Woody Woodpecker was voiced by a woman. However, she soon began to enjoy being known as the voice of Woody Woodpecker and, starting with 1958's Misguided Missile, her name was credited on the screen. Her version of Woody was cuter and friendlier than the manic Woody of the 1940s, and Lantz's artists redesigned the character to suit the new personality. Grace also recorded her own version of Woody's trademark laugh, which was used in the shorts from 1950's Puny Express onward, but Mel Blanc's voice was still heard saying "Guess who!?" in the opening titles.

Lantz's harmonious relationship with Universal, the studio releasing his cartoons, was jarred when new ownership transformed the company into Universal-International and ended many of Universal's company policies. The new management insisted on owning licensing and merchandising rights to Lantz's characters. Lantz refused and withdrew from the parent company by the end of 1947, releasing 12 cartoons independently through United Artists in 1948 and into the beginning of 1949. Financial difficulties forced Lantz to shut down his studio in 1949. Universal-International re-released Lantz's UA cartoons (and several earlier ones) during the shutdown and eventually came to terms with Lantz, who resumed production in 1951.

=== New directors, new styles ===
Tex Avery worked at the Winkler studio and later for Walter Lantz on the Oswald the Lucky Rabbit series from 1928 to 1935, during which he was promoted from inker to animator and occasional director. After being poached by Leon Schlesinger Productions and developing his trademark fast-paced animation style at the studio and Metro-Goldwyn-Mayer, Walter Lantz persuaded him to rejoin the Lantz studio, where he directed four cartoons in 1954–55: Crazy Mixed Up Pup, Sh-h-h-h-h-h, and the Chilly Willy cartoons I'm Cold and The Legend of Rockabye Point. Avery's wild approach to cartoon gags influenced the Lantz staff and temporarily revitalized the Lantz cartoons; The Legend of Rockabye Point and Crazy Mixed Up Pup were nominated for Academy Awards.

Since the early 1950s, Walter Lantz Productions was forced to economize due to losses, no longer using the lush, artistic backgrounds and stylings that had distinguished his 1940s work and causing a salary dispute with Avery. This resulted in Avery leaving the studio, effectively ending Avery's career in theatrical animation. Avery left three new Chilly Willy storyboards behind; these were later made into cartoons by director Alex Lovy.

Lovy left in 1959 to join Hanna-Barbera. While the animation departments of other studios like Paramount and Terrytoons were being entrusted to younger creative directors, Walter Lantz preferred established, veteran directors of the 1930s and '40s. Lantz replaced Lovy with Disney director Jack Hannah. Hannah brought his own sense of humor to the studio, but soon became disillusioned by the Lantz studio's lower standards: "Walter Lantz himself is one of the nicest, sweetest guys. He was great to pick up talent already developed. The only trouble is, once you've been at Disney's, it was just a job. The people you worked with were second-rate [compared to Disney's], and no extra effort was expected. I wasn't used to that. So as a result, I just got bored there." Another industry veteran, Sid Marcus, replaced Hannah in 1962.

=== Later career ===
Walter Lantz brought his old theatrical cartoons to network television in 1957, with The Woody Woodpecker Show (1957-58). Each half-hour program featured new live-action segments with Lantz himself, hosting the show and demonstrating the animation process. The series, originally telecast on ABC, was later syndicated to local stations until 1966. The Woody Woodpecker Show returned to NBC's Saturday-morning schedule in 1970, minus the live-action appearances by Lantz, and again in 1976.

Lantz entertained the troops during the Vietnam War and visited hospitalized veterans. Walter Lantz was a good friend of special-effects animator George Pal.

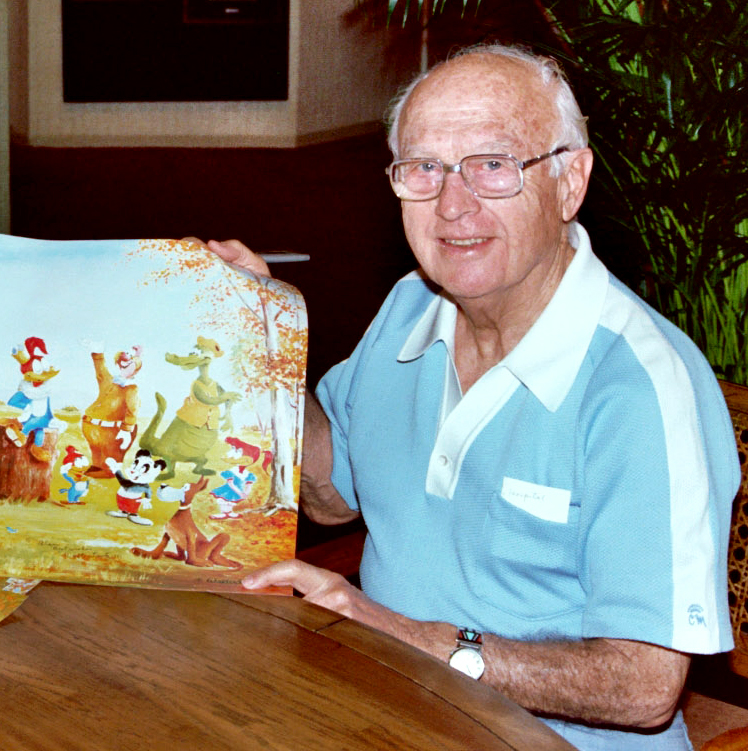
Lantz at an art store in Honolulu, 1983

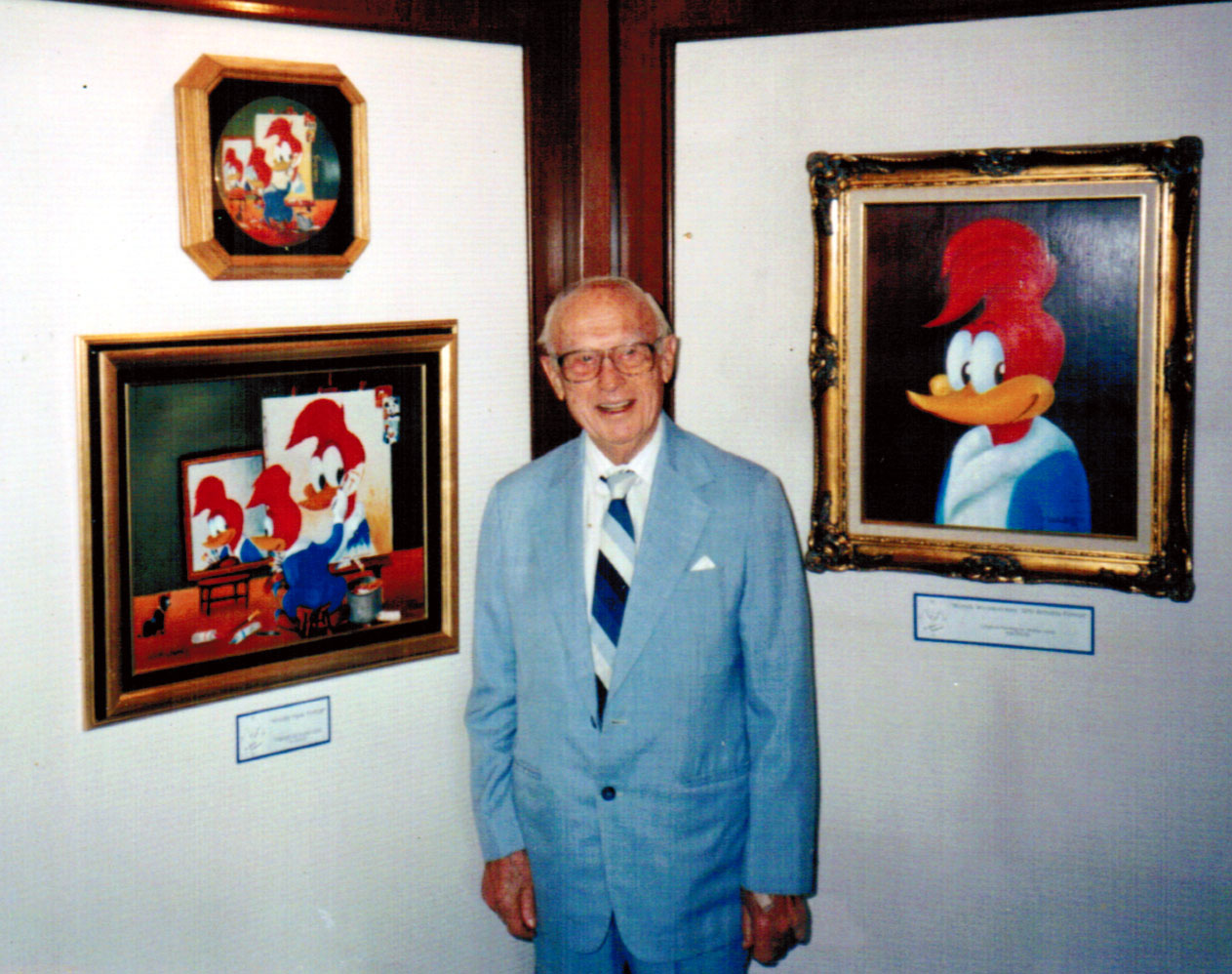
Lantz in 1990 with paintings of Woody Woodpecker

By the late 1960s, other movie studios had discontinued their animation departments, leaving Lantz as one of two producers still making cartoons for theaters (the other was DePatie-Freleng Enterprises). Lantz finally closed his studio's doors for good in 1972, because by then, he explained, it was economically impossible to continue producing them and stay in business as rising inflation had strained his profits, and Universal serviced the remaining demand with reissues of his older cartoons.

== Retirement and death ==
In retirement, Lantz continued to manage his properties by licensing them to media. He continued to draw and paint, selling his paintings of Woody Woodpecker rapidly. On top of that, he worked with Little League and other youth groups in his area. In 1982, Lantz donated 17 artifacts to the Smithsonian Institution's National Museum of American History, among them a wooden model of Woody Woodpecker from the cartoon character's debut in 1940. The Lantzes also made time to visit hospitals and other institutions where Walter would draw Woody and Grace would do the Woody laugh for patients.

During the 1980s and 1990s, Lantz served on the advisory board of the National Student Film Institute.

In 1990, Woody Woodpecker was honored with a star on the Hollywood Walk of Fame. In 1993, Lantz established a $10,000 scholarship and prize for animators in his name at California Institute of the Arts in Valencia, Santa Clarita.

Lantz died at St. Joseph Medical Center in Burbank, California from heart failure on March 22, 1994, at age 94. His ashes were interred beside his wife Gracie (1903–1992), at Hollywood Hills Forest Lawn Memorial Park in Hollywood Hills, Los Angeles County, California, CA., in the Courts of Remembrance section, Columbarium of Radiant Dawn.

== Characters ==
Some characters in the Walter Lantz cartoons (both cartoons and comics) are Oswald the Lucky Rabbit, Andy Panda, The Beary Family, Maggie & Sam, Maw and Paw, Space Mouse, Woody Woodpecker, Inspector Willoughby, Homer Pigeon, Chilly Willy, Lil' Eightball, Charlie Chicken, Cartune, Wally Walrus, and many more.

== Awards ==
- In 1959, Lantz was honored by the Los Angeles City Council as "one of America's most outstanding animated film cartoonists".
- In 1970, Lantz received the Golden Plate Award of the American Academy of Achievement.
- In 1973, the international animation society, ASIFA/Hollywood, presented him with its Annie Award.
- In 1979, he was given a special Academy Award "for bringing joy and laughter to every part of the world through his unique animated motion pictures", being the second animator to receive this award (the first was Walt Disney, who received it three times, while Chuck Jones was in 1995 the third to receive the merit).
- In 1986, he received a star on the Hollywood Walk of Fame.

== See also ==
- The Golden Age of American animation
- The Fantasy Film Worlds of George Pal (1985) (produced and directed by Arnold Leibovit) – a documentary about George Pal in which Lantz appeared as himself.
- Walter Lantz Productions

== Bibliography ==
- The Walter Lantz Story with Woody Woodpecker and Friends by Joe Adamson (1985) ISBN 978-0399130960
