= Grace Stafford =

American actress (1903–1992)

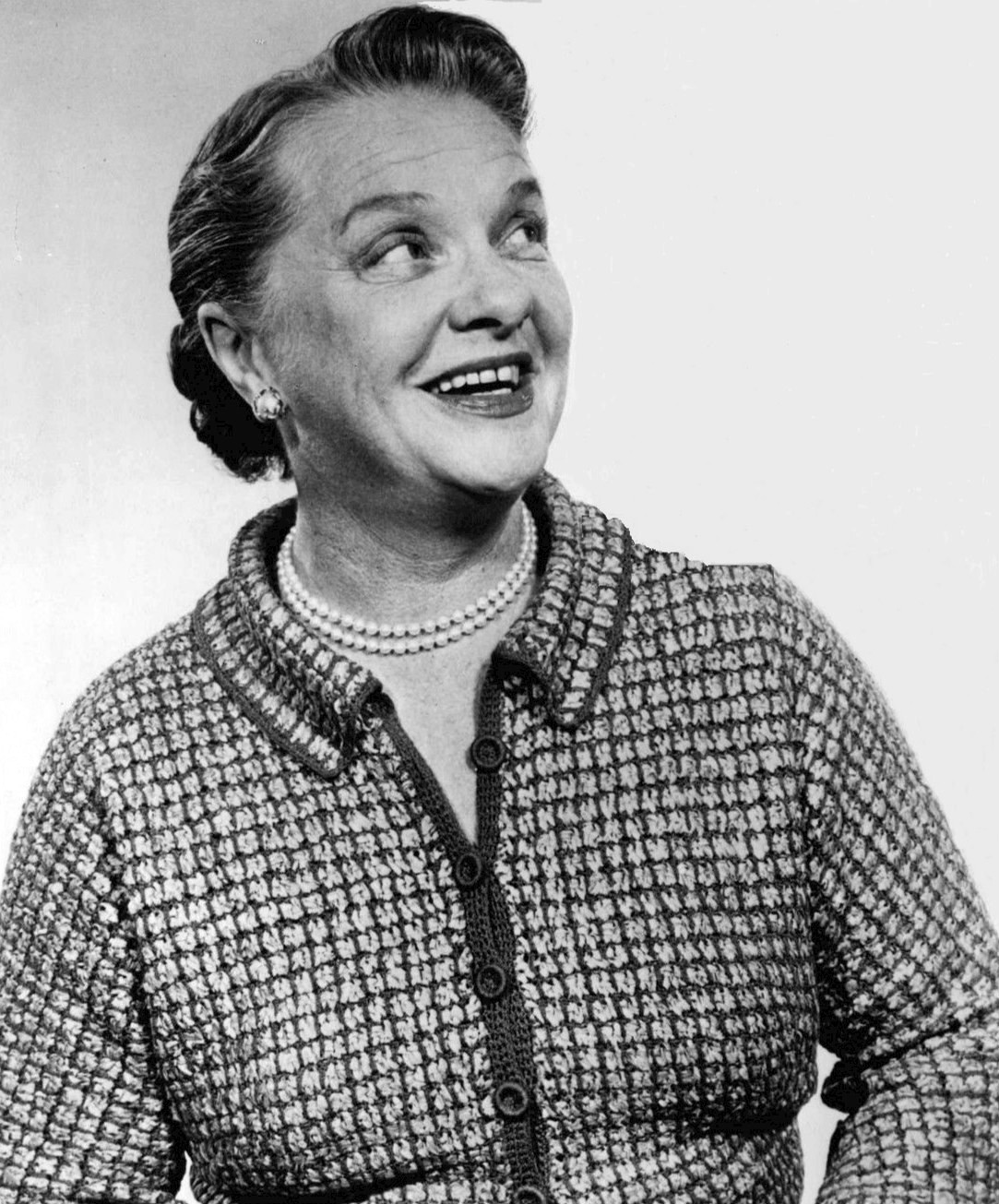
- Stafford in 1958.
- Born: Grace Boyle; November 7, 1903; New York City, U.S.
- Died: March 17, 1992 (aged 88); Burbank, California, U.S.
- Resting place: Forest Lawn Memorial Park (Hollywood Hills)
- Occupation: Actress
- Years active: 1935–1991
- Known for: Woody Woodpecker
- Spouses: Tom Keene (m. 1919; div. 1940) Walter Lantz (m. 1940)

Grace Lantz (née Boyle, November 7, 1903 – March 17, 1992), also known by her stage name Grace Stafford, was an American actress and the wife of animation producer Walter Lantz. Stafford is best known for providing the voice of Woody Woodpecker, a creation of Lantz's, from 1950 to 1991.

== Career ==
Stafford started in Hollywood on stage, at a joint venture between Harold Lloyd's Beverly Hills Little Theatre for Professionals and the Vine Street Theatre, in 1935. She then appeared in feature live-action films from 1935's Dr. Socrates to 1975's Doc Savage: The Man of Bronze. Some of her more notable roles were in the films Anthony Adverse and Blossoms in the Dust. Most of her screen credits were filmed between 1939 and 1942, several for Universal Pictures. There she met the studio's cartoon producer Walter Lantz, and they were married in 1940 after her divorce from cowboy actor Tom Keene.

Ben Hardaway had been the voice of Woody Woodpecker since 1944's The Barber of Seville. In 1948, around the time the Woody short Drooler's Delight was in production, Mel Blanc, who had originally supplied Woody's voice and laugh, filed a lawsuit against Walter Lantz, claiming that Lantz had used his voice in later cartoons (in the title sequences) without permission. The judge, however, ruled for Lantz, saying that Blanc had failed to copyright his voice or his contributions. Though Lantz won the case, he paid Blanc in an out-of-court settlement when Blanc filed an appeal. Wanting to avoid any future retaliation from anyone wanting to sue him, Lantz opted to find a new actor for Woody's speaking voice, as well as a definitive version of the laugh for his star woodpecker.

In 1950, Lantz held anonymous auditions. Stafford offered to do Woody's voice, but Lantz turned her down because Woody was a male character. Not discouraged in the least, Grace made her own anonymous audition tape and submitted it to Walter Lantz Productions. Not knowing who was behind the voice he heard, Lantz picked Grace's voice for Woody Woodpecker, and Grace then identified herself as the mystery performer.

Grace Stafford provided Woody's voice from 1950 to 1972, and also performed in non-Woody cartoons (as well as recording a gag voice track for the 1958 Rowan and Martin feature Once Upon a Horse). She later voiced the Woody character on several rare occasions after the Lantz studio's permanent shut down in 1972, particularly Woody's cameo at the 51st Academy Awards ceremony in 1979.

At first, she asked not to be credited in the role, as she believed that audiences both young and old would be "disillusioned" if they knew Woody was voiced by a woman. But she soon came to enjoy being known as Woody's voice and, starting with 1958's Misguided Missile, finally allowed her name to be credited on screen. Her version of Woody was cuter and friendlier than the manic Woody of the 1940s.

Stafford also appeared on an episode of What's My Line? on November 10, 1963.

== Death ==
Gracie Lantz died of spinal cancer on March 17, 1992, at age 88.

== Filmography ==
- Dr. Socrates (1935) as Caroline Suggs
- I Married a Doctor (1936) as Vera Sherwin
- Anthony Adverse (1936) as Lucia
- The Man Who Dared (1939) as Mary McCrary
- Confessions of a Nazi Spy (1939) as Mrs. Schneider
- The Greener Hills (1939, Short) as Harriet Miller
- Indianapolis Speedway (1939) as Martha Connors
- Hawaiian Nights (1939) as Secretary (uncredited)
- Blondie Brings Up Baby (1939) as Miss White
- Flight Angels (1940) as Buxton
- I Can't Give You Anything But Love, Baby (1940) as Second Operator (uncredited)
- La Conga Nights (1940) as Secretary (uncredited)
- Margie (1940) as Miss Bradley
- A Dispatch from Reuter's (1940) as Woman Dancing with Geller (uncredited)
- Santa Fe Trail (1940) as Farmer's Wife (uncredited)
- Model Wife (1941) as Miss Manahan (uncredited)
- Affectionately Yours (1941) as Miss Anderson
- Blossoms In the Dust (1941) as Molly (uncredited)
- Unfinished Business (1941) as Woman (uncredited)
- Dr. Kildare's Victory (1942) as Mrs. Betty Richards (uncredited)
- What's Cookin'? (1942) as Bob's Assistant (uncredited)
- Larceny, Inc. (1942) as McCarthy's Secretary (uncredited)
- You're Telling Me (1942) as Switchboard Operator (uncredited)
- Destination Moon (1950) as Woody Woodpecker (voice, uncredited)
- Woody Woodpecker theatrical shorts (1951–1972) as Woody Woodpecker / Additional voices (voice)
- Doc Savage: The Man of Bronze (1975) as Little Lady (final film role)
