= Walter Lantz Productions =

American animation studio

- Logo used from 1944 to 1949 and then from 1950 to 1956
- Formerly: Universal Cartoon Pictures (1928–1935)
- Industry: Animation
- Predecessor: Bray Productions; Winkler Pictures
- Founded: 1928; 98 years ago (original); 1950; 76 years ago (reopening)
- Founder: Walter Lantz; Bill Nolan
- Defunct: 1949; 77 years ago (first closure); March 10, 1972; 54 years ago (second closure)
- Fate: Dissolved
- Successor: Universal Animation Studios
- Headquarters: 100 Universal City Plaza, Universal City, California, U.S. (1928–1947, 1950–1972); 861 Seward Street, Hollywood, California, U.S. (1947–1949)
- Key people: Walter Lantz; Bill Nolan; Laverne Harding; Alex Lovy; James Culhane; Dick Lundy; Don Patterson; Paul J. Smith; Tex Avery; Jack Hannah; Sid Marcus
- Products: Theatrical animated short films
- Parent: Universal Pictures (1928–1935)

Walter Lantz Productions was an American animation studio. It was in operation from 1928 to 1949 and then from 1950 to 1972, and was the principal supplier of animation for Universal Pictures.

The studio was originally formed as Universal Cartoon Studios on the initiative of Universal movie mogul Carl Laemmle, who was tired of the continuous company politics he was dealing with concerning contracting cartoons outside animation studios. Animator Bill Nolan and Walter Lantz, who was Laemmle's part-time chauffeur and a veteran of the John R. Bray Studios with considerable experience in all elements of animation production, were selected to run the department.

In 1935, Lantz managed to buy out his studio and gain the copyrights to his characters. The cartoons continued to be distributed by Universal through 1947, changing to United Artists distribution from 1947 until its first closure in 1949, and by Universal again from 1950 until its second and official closure in 1972.

The most prominent characters for the studio were Woody Woodpecker, Andy Panda, Chilly Willy, and Oswald the Lucky Rabbit. Additionally, the music-oriented Swing Symphony cartoons were another successful staple, but ended after swing music's popularity faded after the end of World War II.

== History ==
=== 1928–1935: Early years as Universal Cartoon Studios ===
Walter Lantz began his career at the art department of William Randolph Hearst's New York American during the 1910s, having his start in the cartoon industry at Hearst's International Film Service, which in 1918 transferred its entire staff to Bray Productions. By the mid-1920s, Lantz was directing (and acting in) the studio's top cartoon, Dinky Doodle, also becoming a producer as Bray attempted to compete with Hal Roach and Mack Sennett by making live-action comedies. Bray Productions closed shop in 1928, and Lantz moved to Hollywood, trying to start a studio while trying to make a living in a succession of odd jobs, including driving Universal Pictures owner Carl Laemmle's limousine. The chauffeur job also landed Lantz a job at Winkler Pictures, which, under producer Charles Mintz, produced the Oswald the Lucky Rabbit cartoons for Universal Pictures. Lantz became one of the Oswald series' directors alongside Hugh Harman and Rudolf Ising, after series creators Walt Disney and Ub Iwerks left the company.

The popularity of the Oswald series began to fall because of a decline in quality, alongside a series of heated confrontations between Mintz and Harman & Ising, and then between Laemmle and Harman & Ising, which led Laemmle to fire Mintz and terminate the Winkler contract in early 1929. Laemmle was now looking for someone to run a new in-house animation studio for Universal, and Walter Lantz won the job in a poker game with Laemmle. He reunited with his Bray colleague and former Winkler director Bill Nolan, who led the newly founded studio with him. The first "Oswald" cartoon produced by Lantz at the new Universal Cartoon Studios was Race Riot, released on September 2, 1929. The first animators for the studio included Winkler veterans Rollin Hamilton, Tom Palmer and "rubber-hose" pioneer Bill Nolan. Bert Fiske scored the first cartoons, having done this for the few Winkler sound "Oswalds". Additions to the staff included Pinto Colvig and Tex Avery.

The earliest Lantz cartoons from 1929 were built around set plots and stories, in the tradition of the earlier Disney and Winkler shorts. The conversion of Oswald cartoons into musicals was a different matter, but by mid-1930, Lantz and his staff achieved this goal. In the process however, Oswald's personality became less consistent. It could and did change drastically to fit a particular gag. Lantz's musical directors changed as well. To replace David Broekman, Lantz brought in James Dietrich, a member of the Paul Whiteman Orchestra, making the jazz-era sound of the 1920s a quintessential element in the early Lantz cartoons. He remained as the permanent studio musical director until 1937. Lantz and Nolan worked in a character called "Fanny the Mule" for a 13-cartoon series announced by Laemmle in early 1930, but these cartoons were never produced.

In 1931, Lantz faced economic difficulties and was forced to make cutbacks, shortening the lengths of his films and post-synchronizing a handful of the early Disney-era Oswald cartoons. Another way out of the hole was to gain attention by creating a secondary series of shorts featuring a new star, Pooch the Pup. Lantz and Nolan divided the studio into two separate units. Lantz directed the Pooch cartoons, while Nolan worked on the Oswalds, with both series referencing the dire straits of the Depression. Pooch never became very popular and the series was dropped in 1933. The following year, Nolan left the studio, and the Cartune Classics series of Technicolor shorts began, lasting for a year.

=== 1935–1940: The decline of Oswald and new stars ===
Control of Universal by founder Carl Laemmle and his family was slipping away because of financial difficulties and came to an end in 1936. John Cheever Cowdin became Universal's new president. With the change in management, Lantz seized the opportunity to ask Universal for permission to make his studio independent. Universal agreed, and on November 16, 1935, Lantz broke off and claimed the studio for his own, becoming the Walter Lantz Studio, even though it remained on the Universal lot.

During the mid- to late 1930s, Oswald's popularity declined, and Lantz experimented with other characters to replace him with characters such as Meany, Miny, and Moe, Baby-Face Mouse and Lil' Eightball, but all of them proved unsuccessful. After a succession of failed attempts, Lantz created the character Andy Panda, who debuted in the 1939 short Life Begins for Andy Panda, directed by Alex Lovy. Andy was a hit with audiences, and eventually replaced Oswald (who was retired the year prior) as the studio's leading star. Lantz also switched to all-color production in 1939, shortly before Andy's debut.

In 1940, Lantz's studio was in trouble. Universal once again was facing severe financial difficulties and possible bankruptcy and decided to cut their weekly advance to the now-independent Lantz studio. This was further perpetuated by the brief tenure of Burt Gillett, a former Disney/Van Beuren director which Lantz claimed to have a perfectionist mindset that further strained the studio's finances. Lantz was left scrambling for alternative sources for funds, forcing him to shut down the studio temporarily. Lantz was able to gain the rights to the characters of his films (including Oswald the Lucky Rabbit) and an Andy Panda cartoon, Crazy House, was developed into Lantz's first independently financed film. Lantz used the film as a final appeal to the heads of Universal and, in the end, was able to reach a satisfactory settlement with them. By fall of 1940, Lantz's studio was back in business again.

1940 also marked the debut of Lantz's biggest star: Woody Woodpecker, who debuted in the Andy Panda cartoon Knock Knock. In the short, Woody pesters the Panda family by pecking holes through the roof, but is eventually stopped after Andy sprinkles salt onto his tail. Lantz claimed that the creation of Woody stemmed from a noisy woodpecker he encounter during a honeymoon with his fiancé Grace Stafford. According to Joe Adamson, however, Woody was created by Lantz as a budgetary solution for the aforementioned cartoon. He said that Lantz saw the storyboards for Knock Knock during production and he found that using a rainstorm to create the conflict was "too expensive". He suggested to the writers to use something else that was easier to animate, such as a woodpecker.

=== 1940–1947: Continued success and new talent ===
Scrub Me Mama with a Boogie Beat

Woody quickly became extremely popular, being given his own series in early 1941, and became one of the most famous examples of the "brash bird" cartoon characters of the late 1930s/early 1940s such as Donald Duck (also created by Disney). The success of Scrub Me Mama With A Boogie Beat and Boogie Woogie Bugle Boy of Company B (the former becoming subject to controversy and even protest soon after its release over racial stereotypes, and the latter nominated for an Academy Award) also led to the introduction of the Swing Symphony series that fall, often featuring popular musicians of the time. The series ended in 1945 at the twilight of the big band era.

After the studio's 1930s cartoons were scored by a succession of composers, including James Dietrich, Victor Records producer Nat Shilkret, and Harman-Ising veteran Frank Marsales, Darrell Calker took over in late 1940. Calker's arrangements became noted for their distinctive swing flavor.

After Disney's success with Snow White and the Seven Dwarfs (1937), the Lantz studio planned to make a feature, Aladdin and His Lamp, featuring Universal's comedy team Abbott and Costello in live action, but after Mr. Bug Goes to Town (1941) bombed at the box office, Aladdin never made it to actual production. Late in the decade, Lantz considered making a feature-length cartoon again, but it never came to fruition.

With the studio managing only one production unit, Lantz's output was perhaps the smallest out of any major West Coast animation studio at the time. He and animator Alex Lovy were the primary cartoons directors by the early 40's, although the former would step back from directing by 1942. Lovy was an experienced workhorse who have been directing shorts since 1938, however, his cartoons around this time were considered slower-paced derivatives of the Looney Tunes shorts. In 1943, he was drafted into the U.S. Navy and was replaced by James Culhane in March of that year. Culhane quickly developed a distinct direction and visual style characterized for its use of Russian avant-garde influences, minimalist backgrounds and fast cutting. His influence on the Woody Woodpecker series in particular helped refine both the character and the manic slapstick the series would be known for.

Culhane eventually left Lantz in October 1945 over pay disputes. He was replaced by former Disney director Dick Lundy, who had already joined the studio two years prior. Unlike Culhane, Lundy focused more on visual gags and sophisticated animation. He helped train Lantz's animators by giving them extended sequences that "amply display their talents".

=== 1947–1949: United Artists and first closure ===
In 1947, Lantz renegotiated his seven-year Universal contract with Matty Fox, the new vice president of Universal. The deal was interrupted when new ownership transformed the company into Universal-International and did away with most of Universal's company policies. The new management insisted on getting licensing and merchandising rights to Lantz's characters. Lantz refused and withdrew from the parent company in 1947, vacated Universal City, moving into the former Screen Gems cartoon studio at 861 Seward Street in Hollywood, and releasing 12 cartoons independently through United Artists during 1947 and early 1949. The cartoons from this period stand out for their slicker animation compared to the previous Universal releases, not only because of Lundy's influences, but also the hiring of other Disney veterans, such as Ed Love and Fred Moore.

This era marked the end of the Andy Panda series, whose popularity was waning. Woody remained popular however, with him even getting a hit record, "The Woody Woodpecker Song", by songwriters George Tibbles and Ramey Idriss. This song was included in the 1948 short Wet Blanket Policy, which received an Academy Award nomination for Best Original Song.

Under the deal with United Artists, Lantz was supposed to receive percentages of box-office receipts to pay for the production costs of his cartoons. UA however attributed a tiny portion of the dollar amounts to Lantz's shorts from the features. This was because UA was, at the time, a struggling studio attempting to re-establish the position in the industry it had in the 1920s. The result was that Lantz exceeded his standing loan of $250,000 from Bank of America (he had left Irving Trust in 1942). At the recommendation of BAC president Joe Rosenberg, Lantz decided to shut down his studio temporarily at the end of 1949 until the loan was reduced. He asked Universal to reissue his older films during the hiatus, a request accepted by Universal-International president Nate Blumberg.

In the interim, Lantz made a series of film ads for Coca-Cola. He also went to Europe to look for studios that could animate his films there, approaching government incentives not found stateside, and lower labor costs. The postwar economic situation of these countries as well as the presence of stronger unions than in Hollywood, however, led him to back out and keep making films in America.

=== 1950–1967: Reopening and venture to television ===
In 1950, Walter Lantz Productions opened its doors once again. The first effort the studio produced was a brief sequence featuring Woody Woodpecker for the George Pal feature Destination Moon, released on June 27 the same year. Lantz then renegotiated with Universal-International for seven cartoons to be released the following year, provided that they all featured Woody Woodpecker. Lantz and his crew immediately set to work on the new batch of shorts. Two of these new films — Puny Express and Sleep Happy — were previously story boarded by Ben Hardaway and Heck Allen during the United Artists period. In 1951, the new cartoons were finally released and became instant hits with audiences. They were so successful that Universal commissioned six more shorts for the following year. Lantz wrote and directed these new shorts on until 1952, when roles were given to animator Don Patterson, and writer Homer Brightman. Despite never directing a cartoon before, Patterson showed great aptitude for the position. His shorts, which included Termites from Mars (1952), Hypnotic Hick (1953), A Fine Feathered Frenzy (1954), and Convict Concerto (1954), were praised by animation historians.

In 1953, both MGM and Warner Bros. Pictures briefly closed their entire animation facilities due to the advent of 3-D films. This gave Lantz the opportunity to expand his studio again by hiring some of its displaced staff, including writer Michael Maltese, animators Herman Cohen, Gil Turner, Robert Bentley, and a returning Tex Avery, who replaced Patterson from his role of director and briefly revitalized the studio with the same brand humor he applied to Warner and MGM. A second unit would be established and helmed by Paul J. Smith, a veteran animator for Lantz who would be known for having a much more conservative directorial style. Nevertheless, Smith would find early success by creating the character Chilly Willy, who was then refined by Avery later on. A third unit, managed by former MGM animators Ray Patterson and Grant Simmons, was also established before it was closed when the duo left to form Grantray-Lawrence Animation with Robert Lawrence in 1954. That same year, black-and-white Lantz shorts would enter television syndication by the Motion Pictures for Television, and they were repackaged as Oswald Rabbit Presents.

By the mid-1950s, the film industry was suffering and losing money, meaning lower budgets for cartoons. Avery himself left Lantz in 1955 over pay disputes, and was succeeded by a returning Alex Lovy, who attempted to copy Avery's brand of humor with varying results. Lantz and Universal knew that the only way to subsidize the rising costs of new shorts was to release their product to television. Norman Gluck, from U-I's short subjects department, made a deal with the Leo Burnett Agency to release some older Lantz product on television. Burnett also handled the Kellogg's cereal account and Lantz soon met with the Kellogg's people to sign the contract. At first, Lantz was not very eager and admitted that he was only working in the medium because he was "forced into TV" and "cartoons for theaters would soon be extinct".

The Woody Woodpecker Show debuted on ABC on the afternoon of October 3, 1957, and lasted until September 1958. The series was seen once a week, on Thursday afternoons, replacing the first half hour of the shortened The Mickey Mouse Club. Lantz integrated his existing cartoons with new live-action footage, giving the show an updated look that satisfied both viewers and Lantz himself. The live-action and animation segments created for the show, called "A Moment with Walter Lantz", featured an informative look at how the animation process for his "cartunes" worked and how the writers came up with stories and characters. The live-action segments were directed by Jack Hannah, who was fresh from the Disney Studio, where he had done similar live-action/animation sequences for the Disney show.

Hannah eventually would direct theatrical shorts in 1960 after Lovy left for Hanna-Barbera. Although he was working with more stricter budgets then ever before, his shorts had sophisticated style and brand of humor similar to Dick Lundy. Hannah created characters such as Fatso the Bear (a clone of his character Humphrey the Bear from Disney) and The Beary Family before he left in 1962, with his position given to writer Sid Marcus. In 1964, with new Universal owner MCA Inc. dropping the International name, the cartoons were introduced with the new "Universal presents" opening. Lantz eventually reduced the number of units back to one, leaving Smith as the sole director of all theatrical shorts by 1966.

=== 1967–1972: Official final years ===
By 1969, other film studios had discontinued their animation departments, leaving Walter Lantz as one of the only two producers still making cartoons for theaters. The other one was the start-up DePatie–Freleng Enterprises, working for Lantz' former contractor, United Artists.

From 1967 until the studio's second and official closure in 1972, Universal distributed the Lantz cartoons as packages, and theaters would play them in no particular order. Lantz finally closed up the studio in 1972; he later explained that by then, it was economically impossible to continue producing them and stay in business, as rising inflation had strained his profits, and Universal serviced the remaining demand with reissues of his older cartoons. Bye Bye Blackboard, a Woody Woodpecker cartoon, was part of the final slate of cartoons made at the Walter Lantz studio. Thirteen were completed for the 1972 season: one with Chilly Willy, four starring the Beary Family, and the rest with Lantz' star character, Woody Woodpecker. Upon discovering that it would take a decade for his shorts to show a profit, Lantz himself decided to shut down company operations, and threw a farewell luncheon with his staff at the announcement on March 10 the same year, with him handing Woody watches to them.

=== 1972–1985: Post-second closure ===
In 1985, Lantz sold everything outright to MCA Inc., which supplied his shorts to theaters as late as 1990. In retirement, he painted landscapes and still lifes of his cartoon characters. Since then, Universal has continued to use Woody Woodpecker in theme parks and merchandising. Universal has since produced new projects, including television series and films.

== Legacy ==
Unlike other American major animation studios, the Lantz studio never continued full-time during the classic period of American animation, closing down in 1949 and reopening its doors the following year. It was finally shut down permanently in 1972, after the end of the golden age of American animation. Since then, the studio's characters have continued to be used in syndicated television series, and in licensed merchandise. Lantz reissued six of the 1931–32 Disney Oswald cartoons, including Trolley Troubles, Great Guns! and The Ocean Hop.

Throughout the studio's history, it maintained a reputation as an animation house of medium quality. Lantz's animated shorts (dubbed "Cartunes") were considered superior to Terrytoons, Screen Gems, and Famous Studios, but they never gained the artistic acclaim of Walt Disney Productions, Warner Bros. Cartoons, MGM Cartoons, Fleischer Studios or UPA. The studio, however, benefited from gaining talent from the other studios who were tired of the management there and usually found the Lantz studio a more enjoyable working environment. Tex Avery was just one of the many talents Walter Lantz Productions benefited from on the rebound.

In February 2006, NBCUniversal (which still owns the Lantz library) sold the trademark rights to Oswald the Lucky Rabbit along with the copyright to the original 26 cartoons produced by Walt Disney to The Walt Disney Company. The sale was part of a deal that centered around both the rights to Oswald and NBC's acquisition of the rights to the NFL's weekly Sunday night game; in exchange for NBCUniversal selling the rights to Oswald to Disney, Al Michaels was freed from his contractual obligations with ESPN and ABC so he could join NBC and become the Sunday Night Football play-by-play man.

In July 2007, Universal Pictures Home Entertainment released The Woody Woodpecker and Friends Classic Cartoon Collection, a three-disc DVD box-set compilation of Lantz Cartunes. A second volume was released in April 2008, followed by a plain vanilla release in 2009, Woody Woodpecker Favorites, which contained no new-to-DVD material. Animation historian Jerry Beck, partly involved in the production of the DVD releases, has stated that plans for further volumes are currently on hold.

In 2008, Illumination, an animation production company founded by Chris Meledandri, made a deal with Universal Pictures which positioned Illumination as NBCUniversal's family entertainment arm that would produce one to two films per year starting in 2010. Like Walter Lantz Productions, Illumination retains creative control, and Universal exclusively distributes the films.

Free-to-air linear channel MeTV officially brought back the Walter Lantz cartoons output on American television on September 2, 2023, airing every Saturday as part of the Saturday Morning Cartoons 3-hour block (one hour of which, dedicated to Lantz, being The Woody Woodpecker Show) plus on weekdays as part of Toon In with Me. The Lantz cartoons are also shown daily on the MeTV Toons channel.

== Filmography ==
Theatrical short film series

Title	Years	Cartoons	Notes
Oswald the Lucky Rabbit	1929–1938	138	First series Walter Lantz made; continued from Winkler Productions.
Pooch the Pup	1932–1933	13	
Cartune Classics	1934–1935	6	
Meany, Miny, and Moe	1936–1937	13	
New Universal Cartoons	1938	15	
Cartune Comedies	1938	6	
Cartune	1938–1942; 1953–1957	33	Miscellaneous characters.
Mello-Drama	1939	2	
Nertsery Rhyme	1939	2	
Lil' Eightball	1939	2	
Andy Panda	1939–1949	26	
Peterkin	1939	1	
Woody Woodpecker	1941–1972	196	
Swing Symphony	1941–1945	14	Musical cartoons, often featuring top boogie-woogie musicians.
Musical Miniatures	1946–1948	6	Offshoot of the Swing Symphony series, featuring classical melodies.
Coca-Cola commercials	1948–1953	20	
Foolish Fables	1953	2	
Maw and Paw	1953–1955	4	
Chilly Willy	1953–1972	50	
Sugarfoot	1954	2	
Maggie & Sam	1956–1957	3	
Hercules	1957	2	
Windy & Breezy	1957–1959	5	
Inspector Willoughby	1958–1965	12	
Hickory, Dickory, and Doc	1959–1962	9	
The Beary Family	1962–1972	28	

== Walter Lantz Productions staff: 1928–1972 ==
=== Producers ===
- Walter Lantz

=== Directors ===
- Walter Lantz
- Bill Nolan
- Tex Avery
- Alex Lovy
- Les Kline
- Rudy Zamora
- Fred Kopietz
- Patrick Lenihan
- Burt Gillett
- Elmer Perkins
- Ben Hardaway
- Emery Hawkins
- James Culhane
- Dick Lundy
- Don Patterson
- Paul J. Smith
- Ray Patterson
- Grant Simmons
- Jack Hannah
- Sid Marcus

=== Storyboard artists/writers ===
- Walter Lantz
- Homer Brightman
- Dalton Sandifer
- Tedd Pierce
- Al Bertino
- Dick Kinney
- Cal Howard
- Sid Marcus
- Dale Hale

=== Music ===
- James Dietrich (1930–1938)
- Scott Bradley (1938)
- Frank Marsales (1938–1940)
- Darrell Calker (1940–1949, 1961–1964)
- Clarence Wheeler (1951–1966)
- Walter Greene (1962–1972)

== See also ==
- List of Walter Lantz cartoon characters
- Golden age of American animation
- "Scrub Me Mama with a Boogie Beat"
