= Alex Lovy =

American animator (1913–1992)

- Born: Alexander Lovy; September 2, 1913; Passaic, New Jersey, United States
- Died: February 14, 1992 (aged 78); Valencia, California, United States
- Occupation: Animator
- Years active: 1933–1992
- Employer(s): The Van Beuren Corporation (1933–1936); Walt Disney Productions (1936-1937?); Walter Lantz Productions (1937–1942; 1955–1959); Screen Gems (1945-1946); Hanna-Barbera Productions, Inc. (1959–1967; 1968–1992); Warner Bros.–Seven Arts Animation (1967–1968)
- Known for: director at Walter Lantz Productions; Producer at Hanna-Barbera supervised at Warner Bros.

Alexander Lovy (September 2, 1913 – February 14, 1992) was an American animator. He spent the majority of his career as an animator and director at Walter Lantz Productions. He was later a producer at Hanna-Barbera, and also supervised the cartoon unit at Warner Bros. during its final days.

== Life and career ==
Born in Passaic, New Jersey, Lovy's early career was spent as a comic artist at DC Comics. Later, he became an animator at the Lantz studio in the late 1930s. His first credit as a director was for Feed the Kitty in 1938. Studio head Walter Lantz was taking a hiatus from directing at this time, this gave Lovy an opportunity to direct many of the studio's shorts in the 1938–1940 period. He stepped down to become an animator in 1940 after Lantz reverted to being director. However, he continued to play an important role in the production of the shorts, and stepped up to being the studio's lead director of Woody Woodpecker shorts when Lantz retired from directing in 1942. The following year, however, Lovy was drafted into the US Navy and left the studio; Shamus Culhane in the meantime replaced Lovy.

After the end of World War II, Lovy worked briefly for Columbia Pictures' cartoon unit, Screen Gems, directing five shorts before it was closed down, and in 1955 made his return to the Lantz studio, initially to finish some cartoons that Tex Avery had produced during a brief stint as director there. He carried on directing at the Lantz studio until the end of the decade, at which point he moved over to Hanna-Barbera. There, he worked mainly as a producer and storyboard artist, and often supervised the studio's voice recording sessions. In 1967, Lovy moved to the newly re-opened Warner Bros. cartoon studio, where he created the characters Cool Cat and Merlin the Magic Mouse, in addition to directing cartoons with classic characters Daffy Duck and Speedy Gonzales. After just over a year at Warner Bros., Lovy returned to Hanna-Barbera, and worked there in various capacities until shortly before his death on Valentine's Day, 1992.

According to Lantz, Lovy was ambidextrous, and could draw two storyboards at the same time, one with each hand.
