= Tricks and Treats =

Tricks and Treats may refer to:

- "Tricks and Treats" (American Horror Story), 2012 episode of American Horror Story
- "Tricks and Treats" (Freaks and Geeks), an episode of Freaks and Geeks
- "Tricks and Treats" (Hokey Wolf), 1960 episode of The Huckleberry Hound Show
