= Pixie and Dixie and Mr. Jinks =

American animated television series

- Title card
- Genre: Slapstick; Comedy
- Written by: Charles Shows (season 1); Warren Foster (seasons 2-4)
- Directed by: William Hanna; Joseph Barbera
- Voices of: Don Messick; Daws Butler
- Country of origin: United States
- Original language: English
- No. of seasons: 4
- No. of episodes: 57

Production
- Producers: William Hanna; Joseph Barbera
- Running time: 7 minutes
- Production company: Hanna-Barbera Productions

Original release
- Network: Syndication
- Release: October 2, 1958 – October 13, 1961

Related
- Yogi Bear; The Huckleberry Hound Show; Hokey Wolf

Pixie and Dixie and Mr. Jinks is one of the three segments of The Huckleberry Hound Show. This show was produced by Hanna-Barbera Productions between October 2, 1958, and October 13, 1961, and consists of 57 episodes.

== Plot ==
The cartoon series stars two mice, the bow-tied Pixie (voiced by Don Messick) and the vested Dixie (voiced by Daws Butler), and Mr. Jinks the cat (also voiced by Butler) who is always outfoxed by the mice, causing him to utter his catchphrase "I hate meeces to pieces!"

The show's plot itself and its characters followed the same basic concept as Tom and Jerry, the film series Hanna-Barbera had developed for MGM; because Hanna-Barbera were constrained by the smaller budgets for television, Pixie and Dixie and Mr. Jinks emphasized verbal humor to compensate for the more limited animation compared to the more physical comedy used by the mostly mute Tom and Jerry shorts.

== Cast ==
- Don Messick as Pixie
- Daws Butler as Dixie and Mr. Jinks

== Episodes ==
=== Season 1 (1958–59) ===
Every episode this season was written by Charles Shows.

No. overall	No. in series	Title	Animation	Layout	Backgrounds	Original release date	Prod. code
1	1	"Cousin Tex"	Carlo Vinci & Mike Lah	Ed Benedict	Fernando Montealegre	October 2, 1958	E-14
Pixie and Dixie's cousin Tex arrives from Texas, and proves to be more than a match for Jinks, who in turn summons his cousin Pecos.
2	2	"Judo Jack"	Ken Muse & Mike Lah	Dick Bickenbach	Frank Tipper	October 9, 1958	E-5
Pixie and Dixie call upon Judo Jack to teach them how defend themselves against Jinks in the martial art of judo.
3	3	"Kit Kat Kit"	Ken Muse	Ed Benedict	Frank Tipper	October 16, 1958	E-10
Jinks builds a robot cat to take care of Pixie and Dixie; their efforts against it don't work until they make it think Jinks is a mouse.
4	4	"Jinks’ Mice Device"	Ken Muse & Mike Lah	Mike Lah	Fernando Montealegre	October 23, 1958	E-16
Jinks builds a machine he thinks will liquidate Pixie and Dixie. It makes the mice invisible and they drive Jinks mad with their tricks.
5	5	"Pistol Packin' Pirate"	Ken Muse & Mike Lah	Dick Bickenbach	Frank Tipper	October 30, 1958	E-4
On a pirate ship, the captain threatens to make Jinks walk the plank if Pixie and Dixie are not taken care of.
6	6	"Scaredycat Dog"	Lew Marshall	Dick Bickenbach	Fernando Montealegre	November 6, 1958	E-12
Pixie and Dixie buy a dog for $5 to get Jinks, but the dog is scared of cats. The dog's twin brother then comes to the rescue.
7	7	"Little Bird-Mouse"	Lew Marshall & Mike Lah	Ed Benedict	Fernando Montealegre	November 13, 1958	E-6
Dixie picks up a flying talent and uses it to save Pixie and their teacher from Jinks, who tries to catch Dixie for a lot of money.
8	8	"Jiggers... It's Jinks!"	Carlo Vinci	Paul Sommer	Dick Thomas	November 20, 1958	E-102
Pixie, Dixie and Jinks live happily in a cheese factory. Jinks is replaced by a cat named Bullet. All three try creative ways to get back in.
9	9	"The Ghost with the Most"	Ken Muse & Mike Lah	Dick Bickenbach	Bob Gentle	November 27, 1958	E-17
Jinks thinks he killed Dixie. Dixie dresses as a ghost to haunt Jinks and get him to obey him. Jinks finds out and plays his own trick.
10	10	"The Ace of Space"	Ken Muse & Mike Lah	Walt Clinton	Bob Gentle	December 4, 1958	E-22
After being chased by Jinks, Dixie dreams he meets Captain Micetro and becomes an invader against Jinks.
11	11	"Jinks Junior"	Lew Marshall & Mike Lah	Dick Bickenbach	Fernando Montealegre	December 11, 1958	E-23
Jinks tries to teach his boy to catch mice. He is slow at learning but after success, hasn't learned about relationship with dogs.
12	12	"Jinks the Butler"	Ken Muse	Ed Benedict	Fernando Montealegre	December 25, 1958	E-27
Jinks is under orders to guard a banquet. Pixie and Dixie try incessantly to crash the party, until Jinks plants a firecracker in an apple.
13	13	"Jinks Flying Carpet"	Ken Muse	Dick Bickenbach	Fernando Montealegre	January 1, 1959	E-48
Jinks receives a package with a flying carpet. He tries it out on Pixie and Dixie but he loses it out of the window.
14	14	"Puppet Pals"	Lew Marshall	Mike Lah	Fernando Montealegre	January 15, 1959	E-26
After his usual chase routine, Jinks befriends Bow Wow. Pixie and Dixie decide to break up their friendship, but fail.
15	15	"Mark of the Mouse"	Carlo Vinci	Dick Bickenbach	Sam Clayberger	January 22, 1959	E-30
Dixie attempts to scare Jinks with a Mark of the Mouse costume. Jinks plays along, but then he duels the real Mark of the Mouse.
16	16	"Dinky Jinks"	Carlo Vinci	Dick Bickenbach	Bob Gentle	February 5, 1959	TBA
Jinks mixes a formula that shrinks him to mouse size. He fails to get Pixie and Dixie and seeks their help from a chasing dog.
17	17	"Hypnotize Surprise"	Lew Marshall	Walt Clinton	Fernando Montealegre	February 12, 1959	TBA
Pixie and Dixie try some hypnotism on Jinks. It all goes wrong when they make Jinks think he's a mouse and he makes himself a train.
18	18	"Nice Mice"	Ken Muse	Dick Bickenbach	Art Lozzi	February 26, 1959	E-53
Pixie and Dixie helps a dumped kitten. Jinks tries to stop the mice taking his milk. When he sees the kitten, he takes over caring for it.
19	19	"King-Size Surprise"	Lew Marshall	Walt Clinton	Bob Gentle	March 5, 1959	E-56
Pixie and Dixie help a dog called King-Size retrieve his license. In return, he helps them against Jinks until he is taken by a dog catcher.
20	20	"Cat-Nap Cat"	Ken Muse	Dick Bickenbach	Bob Gentle	March 12, 1959	TBA
Jinks has been rewarded for mouse catching. Knowing his secret, Pixie and Dixie decide to interrupt his cat nap.
21	21	"Mouse-Nappers"	Ken Muse	Dick Bickenbach	Bob Gentle	March 19, 1959	E-62
A cat takes Pixie and Dixie away and Jinks begins a fight with him until both of them share the mice.
22	22	"Boxing Buddy"	Ken Muse	Dick Bickenbach	Art Lozzi	March 26, 1959	E-65
Pixie and Dixie meet a kangaroo called Ka-Pow, who Jinks mistakes for an oversized mouse; Ka-Pow is soon reclaimed to star on television.

=== Season 2 (1959–60) ===
Every episode hereafter were written by Warren Foster.

No. overall	No. in series	Title	Animation	Layout	Backgrounds	Original release date	Prod. code
23	1	"Hi-Fido"	Manuel Perez	Ed Benedict	Dick Thomas	September 12, 1959	K-27
Pixie and Dixie try to scare Jinks with ventriloquism, which soon stops working... until it summons a bulldog in the house.
24	2	"Rapid Robot"	Carlo Vinci	Dick Bickenbach	Joe Montell	September 19, 1959	K-28
Jinks gets a cat robot to catch Pixie and Dixie for him. To get even, the mice get a dog robot; in the end, both robots cause chaos.
25	3	"Sour Puss"	Ed Love	Dick Bickenbach	Dick Thomas	September 26, 1959	K-29
Jinks is thrown out by the house butler after disposing of Pixie and Dixie. Jinks gets them back, but the butler takes his job shortly.
26	4	"King Size Poodle"	Carlo Vinci	Dick Bickenbach	Dick Thomas	October 3, 1959	K-30
Pixie and Dixie disguise an escaped lion as a giant poodle, who misleads Jinks to protect his cover.
27	5	"Mighty Mite"	Lew Marshall	Ed Benedict	Dick Thomas	October 10, 1959	K-31
Pixie and Dixie invite Champion Rooster El Puncho in their house, who then gives Jinks a punching fight.
28	6	"Bird Brained Cat"	Don Patterson	Dick Bickenbach	Bob Gentle	October 17, 1959	K-32
When the neighbors leave their pet canary with Jinks' owners while they're away, Jinks comes down with a serious case of what he calls "canaryitis"; he turns to Pixie and Dixie for help in resisting catching the canary.
29	7	"Batty Bat"	Don Williams	Walt Clinton	Dick Thomas	October 24, 1959	K-33
Jinks keeps Pixie and Dixie cloistered, when Dixie's cousin Batty arrives to help them; Jinks' every attempt to get Batty is futile.
30	8	"Lend-Lease Meece"	George Nicholas	Walt Clinton	Art Lozzi	October 31, 1959	K-34
A new cat named Charlie moves in next door, whom Jinks quickly befriends. When Charlie informs Jinks that the new house has no mice yet, Jinks sends Pixie and Dixie over to Charlie's place until Charlie gets mice of his own. However, the two mice begin enjoying their stay, all the while Jinks begins feeling lonesome. Everyone later comes to a compromise when a new mouse arrives on the scene.
31	9	"A Good Good Fairy"	Lew Marshall	Dick Bickenbach	Dick Thomas	November 7, 1959	K-35
Pixie and Dixie rely on a fairy mouse godmother to take care of the bullying Jinks. She plays tricks on him, until he feels unwell.
32	10	"Heavens to Jinksy"	Ken Muse	Ed Benedict	Joe Montell	November 14, 1959	K-36
In an unconscious dream, Jinks is on a thin line between the afterlifes, but has a chance to make up for antagonizing Pixie and Dixie.
33	11	"Goldfish Fever"	Dick Lundy	Dick Bickenbach	Bob Gentle	November 21, 1959	K-37
Jinks tries to catch the neighbor's goldfish, whilst running into the bulldog; Pixie and Dixie try to snap Jinks out of his obsession.
34	12	"Pushy Cat"	Carlo Vinci	Paul Sommer	Dick Thomas	November 28, 1959	K-38
A cat, claiming to be Jinks' buddy Arnold, barges in; Arnold's true intention, however, is to catch both Pixie and Dixie.
35	13	"Puss in Boats"	Dick Lundy	Paul Sommer	Dick Thomas	December 5, 1959	K-39
Pixie and Dixie depart for vacation, but Jinks can't bear to part with them; when the mice begin to feel homesick, they call for Jinks' help.

=== Season 3 (1960–61) ===
No. overall	No. in series	Title	Animation	Layout	Backgrounds	Original release date	Prod. code
36	1	"High Jinks"	Dick Lundy	Tony Rivera	Art Lozzi	September 11, 1960	K-43
Jinks forces Pixie and Dixie to take part in his project of going to the Moon; Jinks then has to rescue them from a cheese factory.
37	2	"Price for Mice"	Ken Muse	Walt Clinton	Fernando Montealegre	September 18, 1960	K-41
Jinks tricks Pixie and Dixie into getting painted white, so he can sell them to a lab. His curiosity soon gets him on a launch to the moon.
38	3	"Plutocrat Cat"	Lew Marshall	Walt Clinton	Bob Gentle	September 25, 1960	K-42
Pixie and Dixie move to a rich cat's place to escape from Jinks; while Jinks is lonesome, some luxuries disagree with the mice.
39	4	"Pied Piper Pipe"	Don Patterson	Walt Clinton	Bob Gentle	October 2, 1960	K-40
Jinks picks up the idea from a book of controlling Pixie and Dixie with a pipe; in turn, the two trick him with a dog whistle.
40	5	"Woo for Two"	Bob Carr	Tony Rivera	Bob Gentle	October 9, 1960	K-45
Jinks is in love with Bridgette. To his surprise, she's engaged to another cat. Pixie and Dixie try to sort the problem out.
41	6	"Party Peeper Jinks"	Dick Lundy	Tony Rivera	Bob Gentle	October 16, 1960	K-44
After Jinks excludes Pixie and Dixie from his party, Rocky decides to teach Jinks a lesson, which makes Jinks distrust his invited friends.
42	7	"A Wise Quack"	Bob Carr	Paul Sommer	Vera Hanson	October 23, 1960	K-46
Jinks sends a duckling out of the house, but Pixie and Dixie convince him to save the duckling from the duck hunting season.
43	8	"Missile Bound Cat"	Lew Marshall	Tony Rivera	Dick Thomas	October 30, 1960	K-48
Jinks insists to Pixie and Dixie, that "Space Cat" is only a TV show. Space Cat arrives to take Jinks to his planet where Jinks changes his priorities.
44	9	"Kind to Meeces Week"	Hicks Lokey	Paul Sommer	Vera Hanson	November 6, 1960	K-47
Spike tries to convince Jinks it is "Be Kind to Animals Week". When Jinks gets the message, Pixie and Dixie take advantage of this.
45	10	"Crew Cat"	Brad Case	Paul Sommer	Dick Thomas	November 13, 1960	K-49
Jinks takes Pixie and Dixie aboard a ship to get the job of getting rid of mice. Knowing they've been used, the mice deliver payback to Jinks.
46	11	"Jinxed Jinks"	Art Davis	Paul Sommer	Bob Gentle	November 20, 1960	K-50
Jinks gets Pixie and Dixie an insurance policy, for his own personal gain. He tries to get the mice in an accident but runs into one of his own.
47	12	"Light Headed Cat"	Lew Marshall	Paul Sommer	Dick Thomas	November 27, 1960	K-51
Jinks has applied for a job, which unknown to him will have his gravity removed. A monkey keeps Jinks in anti-gravity for a long time.
48	13	"Mouse for Rent"	Bob Carr	Tony Rivera	Dick Thomas	December 4, 1960	K-52
Jinks starts up a renting service, where cats can rent Pixie and Dixie. When the business starts to prosper, the mice take over.

=== Season 4 (1961-62) ===
No. overall	No. in series	Title	Animation	Layout	Backgrounds	Original release date
49	1	"Jinks' Jinx"	Emil Carle	Jack Huber	Art Lozzi	August 18, 1961
When Jinks' old pal Howard visits, the two begin having fun with Pixie and Dixie, who take it upon themselves to convince Jinks that Howard brings bad luck (since Howard is a black cat).
50	2	"Fresh Heir"	LaVerne Harding	Tony Rivera	Dick Thomas	August 25, 1961
Jinks has inherited from Mrs. Smithers an old mansion and moves in, leaving Pixie and Dixie behind. The two mice make the place haunted to scare Jinks into going back home.
51	3	"Strong Mouse"	Hicks Lokey	Tony Rivera	Dick Thomas	September 1, 1961
Jinks is taken to meet master cat Gus, while Pixie and Dixie's cousin Hercules comes and unknowingly saves Jinks' bacon from Gus.
52	4	"Bombay Mouse"	John Boersema	Tony Rivera	Dick Thomas	September 8, 1961
An Indian mouse named Tabu meets Pixie and Dixie and demonstrates some magic on Jinks. Tabu leaves a few magic tricks behind as he departs.
53	5	"Mouse Trapped"	Ken O'Brien	Lance Nolley	Art Lozzi	September 15, 1961
Jinks builds a robot mouse dame to get Pixie and Dixie to squabble over her affection. When they see through the trick, they use the robot mouse against Jinks.
54	6	"Magician Jinks"	Ed Parks	Jerry Eisenberg	Art Lozzi	September 22, 1961
Jinks receives a magic kit. With it, he makes Pixie and Dixie disappear. The mice aided by a bulldog to get even with him.
55	7	"Meece Missiles"	Carlo Vinci	Tony Rivera	Dick Thomas	September 29, 1961
Jinks tries to dispose of Pixie and Dixie in a balloon. The mice are tailed by the air force and broadcast on television.
56	8	"Homeless Jinks"	Ken O'Brien & Carlo Vinci	Tony Rivera	Dick Thomas	October 6, 1961
Jinks' master throws him out due to his messes. Pixie and Dixie summon mice to overrun the house making Jinks wanted back into the house.
57	9	"Home Flea"	John Boersema	James Carmichael	Dick Thomas	October 13, 1961
A homeward bound flea with great strength takes refuge on Jinks and prevents him from bullying Pixie and Dixie.

== Home media ==
In 1989, Hanna-Barbera Home Video released some episodes on the VHS release entitled "Pixie and Dixie: Love Those Meeces to Pieces".

The episodes "King Size Surprise", "Judo Jack", and "Jinks Jr." were released on another VHS tape by Hanna-Barbera Home Video in 1990.

On November 15, 2005, Warner Home Video released The Huckleberry Hound Show–Vol 1. Some cartoons are available on this DVD release.

The "Heavens to Jinksy" short is available on the Cartoon Network Cartoon Crack Ups VHS and DVD.

On August 26, 2025, Warner Archive Collection released The Huckleberry Hound Show: The Complete Original Series, an 11-disc Blu-ray box set that contains all 68 episodes (including the 57 Pixie and Dixie and Mr. Jinks segments) restored with the original opening/closing credits and bridging material intact, as well as all the extras from the 2005 DVD.

== In other languages ==
- Brazilian Portuguese: Plic e Ploc e Chuvisco
- Bulgarian: Пикси, Дикси и мистър Джинкс
- Czech: Pišta a Fišta (Mr. Jinks is called Fous, meaning Whiskers)
- French: Pixie, Dixie et Jules
- German: Pixie und Dixie
- Hungarian: Inci, Finci és Kandúr Bandi
- Italian: Pixie e Dixie
- Japanese: チュースケとチュータ (Chuusuke to Chuuta), (Mr. Jinks is called both Jinks and Doraneko)
- Polish: Pixie, Dixie i Pan Jinks
- Serbian: Piksi i Diksi
- Spanish: Pixie, Dixie y el Gato Jinks. The characters were dubbed in an unusual way, each one speaking Spanish with a distinct accent. Mr. Jinks had a strong Southern Spanish (Andalusian) accent, Dixie was Cuban and Pixie was Mexican.
- Turkish: Bıcır, Gıcır & Tırmık

== Other appearances ==
- Pixie and Dixie made a non-speaking cameo appearance in the Christmas special Casper's First Christmas as brother and sister.
- Pixie and Dixie and Mr. Jinks appeared in the Christmas special Yogi Bear's All Star Comedy Christmas Caper.
- Pixie and Dixie and Mr. Jinks appeared in The Yogi Bear Show episode "Yogi's Birthday Party."
- Pixie and Dixie and Mr. Jinks made non-speaking cameos and in the opening title of Yogi's Gang.
- Pixie, Dixie and Mr. Jinks were featured in the Laff-A-Lympics as members of the Yogi Yahooeys.
- Pixie and Dixie and Mr. Jinks appeared in some episodes of Yogi's Treasure Hunt.
- Pixie and Dixie appeared in the "Fender Bender 500" segment of Wake, Rattle, and Roll driving a cheese-modeled monster truck called the Chedder Shredder. While Pixie was still voiced by Don Messick, Dixie was voiced by Patric Zimmerman.
- Pixie and Dixie appeared in the Scooby-Doo, Where Are You! episode "Foul Play in Funland". When Shaggy and Scooby were in the Hall of Mirrors, Scooby sees a giant reflection of a mouse that is reminiscent of Pixie and Dixie in a mirror, shortly before Charlie the Funland Robot catches them.
- Pixie and Dixie were going to have a cameo in the 1988 film Who Framed Roger Rabbit, but were later dropped for unknown reasons.
- In Yo Yogi!, Pixie and Dixie (voiced again by Don Messick and Patric Zimmerman) live in a cheese store run by Mr. Jinks (voiced by Greg Burson). In "Of Meece and Men," Dick Dastardly and Muttley teach Mr. Jinks to act tough in order to get the two mice out of his cheese store causing the L.A.F. Squad to intervene.
- Pixie, Dixie and Mr. Jinks (all voiced by Jeff Bergman) appeared in the Cartoon Network/Boomerang short "Harasscat". Pixie and Dixie get a restraining order on Jinks for stalking.
- Cartoon Network had a bumper with Pixie, Dixie, and Mr. Jinks spoofing The Shining which was a Halloween eyecatch.
- In 1961, Mr. Jinks served as the UK mascot of Coco Pops.
- Pixie and Dixie make cameos in the Harvey Birdman, Attorney at Law episodes "Shazzan", "Juror in Court" and "The Death of Harvey".
- The series was parodied in the 1998–2001 Hungarian gag dub Narancs, Tetves és Dugó.
- Pixie, Dixie and Mr. Jinks appeared in DC Comics Deathstroke/Yogi Bear Special #1 as captured animals alongside other Hanna-Barbera characters.
- Pixie, Dixie and Mr. Jinks appeared in Jellystone! with Mr. Jinks voiced again by Jeff Bergman and Pixie voiced by Jenny Lorenzo. Dixie is a girl in this series and appears mute. Mr. Jinks works as Mayor Huckleberry Hound's personal assistant and the mice are mentioned to own a candy store.

== See also ==
- List of The Huckleberry Hound Show episodes
- List of works produced by Hanna-Barbera
- List of Hanna-Barbera characters
