= Huckleberry Hound Meets Wee Willie =

- The Huckleberry Hound Show episode
- Title card for the episode
- Episode no.: Season 1 Episode 1a
- Directed by: William Hanna; Joseph Barbera
- Written by: Charles Shows; Dan Gordon
- Cinematography by: Kenneth Muse (animator)
- Original air date: September 29, 1958
- Running time: 7:16 minutes

Guest appearance
- Don Messick as Wee Willie

Episode chronology
← Previous —	Next → "Cousin Tex"

"Huckleberry Hound Meets Wee Willie" is the first episode of the first season of The Huckleberry Hound Show. It premiered on September 29, 1958, and was produced and directed by William Hanna and Joseph Barbera, while the story was crafted by Charles Shows and Dan Gordon. The pilot employs physical comedy.

== Plot ==
Huckleberry Hound is serving as a police officer and patrolling the streets until he receives a radio call to apprehend a 350-pound (160 kg) gorilla named Wee Willie who has gotten loose throughout the city. After coming across his suspect, the playful ape has no intention of being taken in and quickly runs away into a busy construction site where both he and Huckleberry Hound begin to match wits. The cartoon ends with officer Huckleberry eventually trapping Wee Willie inside a barrel until he later escapes again, taking Huckleberry's entire patrol car with him.

== Reception ==
After watching the episode, Larry Wolters said the television show would become a "smash hit" for both adults and children.

== See also ==
- The Huckleberry Hound Show
  - List of The Huckleberry Hound Show episodes
  - Huckleberry Hound (character)
- List of works produced by Hanna-Barbera Productions
