= Tricks and Treats (The Huckleberry Hound Show) =

- The Huckleberry Hound Show episode
- Title card for the episode
- Episode no.: Season 3 Episode 1c
- Directed by: William Hanna; Joseph Barbera
- Written by: Warren Foster
- Cinematography by: Don Patterson (animator)
- Original air date: September 11, 1960
- Running time: 7:11 minutes

Guest appearance
- Doug Young as Farmer Smith

Episode chronology
← Previous "High Jinks"	Next → "Legion Bound Hound"

"Tricks and Treats" is the first Hokey Wolf segment; this segment is from the season premiere of the third season of the American animated television series The Huckleberry Hound Show, and aired on September 11, 1960. The episode was written by Warren Foster and directed by William Hanna and Joseph Barbera.

== Plot ==
Hokey Wolf and his young companion Ding-A-Ling Wolf are trotting through the countryside. Ding mentions he is tired and hungry; Hokey has a plan that will allow them to "dine sumptuously". In Hokey's possession is a briefcase containing his makeshift "survival kit", which includes a wolf trap, a camera, and a newspaper; all used to frame an unsuspecting farmer and eventually work their way into a hot meal. When they arrive at a farmer's house, they go up to the chicken coop where Hokey assembles the survival kit, planting his foot inside the wolf trap. Hokey starts howling until farmer Smith rushes up to him. Ding begins taking pictures documenting the farmer's supposed cruelty and Hokey's innocent act.

Pretending to have a crippled leg, Hokey shows the farmer the newspaper which declares it is "Be Kind to Animals Week". He informs Smith that he will be taking him to court for animal cruelty, but the farmer instead invites Hokey into his house to "talk it over". Hokey, comfortable in bed, suggests he will feel even better if he had something to eat. The farmer brings him a bowl of hot barley water and returns to his plowing. Annoyed, Hokey decides to raid the fridge. Ding is worried the farmer will catch them, but Hokey guarantees their protection by phoning the Humane Society and arranging for someone to come over to do a story about the situation. The farmer, worried about how Hokey is doing, looks through a window to see both wolves eating his food and dancing to music on the radio. Angered, the farmer threatens to shoot Hokey – and follows through, although Hokey plugs the barrel with a finger. As Smith chases Hokey, promising to "tear you apart with my bare hands, wolf", two people from the Humane Society arrive for publicity photographs. The cartoon ends with Hokey once again resting in bed and farmer Smith forced into providing foster care for both Hokey and Ding-A-Ling.

== See also ==
- List of works produced by Hanna-Barbera Productions
