= Huckleberry Hound =

American animated television character

- The Huckleberry Hound Show character
- First appearance: Huckleberry Hound Meets Wee Willie (1958)
- Created by: William Hanna; Joseph Barbera
- Voiced by: Daws Butler (1958–1988); Gilbert Mack (Note: Quick Draw McGraw and Huckleberry Hound LP (1959)); Jack Mercer (Note: Movie Wheels Present Huckleberry Hound and Yogi Bear (1960)); Sascha Burland (Note: Howl Along with Huckleberry Hound and Yogi Bear (1960)); Frank Milano (Note: Hokey Wolf and Ding-A-Ling/A Wolf's Work is Never Done (1961)); Paul Frees (Note: Huckleberry Hound Tells Stories of Uncle Remus (1965)); Chuck McCann (Note: Wake Up, America! LP (1965)); Greg Burson (1988–2003); Greg Berg (Yo Yogi!); Keith Scott (Hanna-Barbera Gala Celebrity Nite); Jeff Bergman (Cartoon Network commercial, 1999–present); Karl Wiedergott (The Simpsons); Billy West (Everybody in Leather commercial, Wacky Races); James Arnold Taylor (Johnny Bravo, Cartoon Network commercials, Boomerang commercials); Tom Kenny (Evil Con Carne); Jim Conroy (Jellystone!); Chris Finney (The Freddy Funko Show)

In-universe information
- Nickname: Huck
- Species: Dog
- Gender: Male
- Occupation: Folk ballad singer
- Musical instrument: Guitar; Banjo

Huckleberry "Huck" Hound is a fictional cartoon character, an anthropomorphic blue dog who speaks with a North Carolina accent. He first appeared in the series The Huckleberry Hound Show. The cartoon was one of six TV shows to win an Emmy Award in 1960 as a Primetime Emmy Award for Outstanding Children's Program; the first animated series to receive such an award.

In most of his cartoons he has different jobs with results that backfire, yet he usually comes out on top, either through slow persistence or sheer luck. He has been a Roman gladiator, a medieval knight, a dogcatcher, a policeman and a rocket scientist. He also appears in futuristic cartoons, as an intergalactic space policeman, alongside other Hanna-Barbera characters. His off-key and inaccurate rendition of "Oh My Darling, Clementine" was often used as a running gag.

== Concept and creation ==
In 1953, Tex Avery created a character known as the Southern Wolf (later Dixie Wolf in The Tom & Jerry Show) for his MGM cartoons The Three Little Pups and Billy Boy. Introduced as an antagonist to Droopy, the wolf had a southern drawl and laid-back mannerisms provided by Daws Butler. The most memorable trait of the character was that whenever something painful or unpleasant happened to him, the Wolf never lost his cool; instead, he calmly talked to the audience or kept whistling the song "Year of Jubilo". After Avery left MGM, William Hanna and Joseph Barbera produced two more shorts with the character. In two of his cartoons (Billy Boy and Blackboard Jumble), the wolf plays a role that was exactly like a usual Huckleberry Hound short, aside from his frequent use of slang, and the echo-like repetition of words he had only in Billy Boy. Sheep Wrecked was the wolf's final appearance.

Huck's name is a reference to the 1884 American novel Adventures of Huckleberry Finn, written by Mark Twain. Hanna and Barbera almost named Yogi Bear "Huckleberry Bear".

He was voiced in the original cartoons in 1958 by Daws Butler, who had given a similar voice and characterization to the dog characters Reddy in The Ruff and Reddy Show and Smedley in Walter Lantz's Chilly Willy shorts. The voice for Huck was actually inspired by a neighbor of Butler's wife, Myrtis Martin, in her hometown Albemarle, North Carolina. Butler would visit Myrtis and her family and would talk to the neighbor who was a veterinarian. Butler found the man's voice amusing and remembered it when it came time to voice Huck. The voice bore similarities to that of Andy Griffith, who likewise based his character accent on a rural North Carolina town (in Griffith's case, Mount Airy), and Hanna-Barbera was known for its characters' voices being parodies of known celebrities; Butler, who had been using the accent for about a decade before Griffith became famous, denied this rumor.

== Role in later productions ==
Following The Huckleberry Hound Show Huck appeared in The Yogi Bear Show episode "Yogi's Birthday Party" where he and the others help celebrate Yogi Bear's birthday. He later made a cameo in the Top Cat episode "King for a Day", in a comic cover along with Yogi. Following a decade hiatus, Huck reunites with Yogi, Boo-Boo, Snagglepuss, Quick Draw McGraw, Magilla Gorilla and others traveling around America in the half-hour series Yogi's Gang. Debuting in 1973, the characters traveled in a ship called Yogi's Ark, which resembles Noah's Ark with a helicopter propeller added, solving problems including Mr. Waste's pollution, Mr. Bigot's bigotry, and other various issues.

Huckleberry appeared as a member of "The Yogi Yahooeys" team on Scooby's All-Star Laff-A-Lympics from 1977 to 1979. The Galaxy Goof-Ups segment of the 1978 series Yogi's Space Race featured new characters Captain Snerdley, Scare Bear, and Quack-Up the Duck with returnees Huck and Yogi, traveling through space to multiple planets in a race throughout the galaxy. The one episode of Yogi's Space Race also reveals Huck's origin in Memphis, Tennessee. The series soon split off to its own half-hour program where Huck, Yogi, Scare Bear, and Quack-Up are bumbling intergalactic police officers.

In 1979, Huck appeared alongside Yogi and the gang in Casper's First Christmas, in which they meet Casper the Friendly Ghost and Hairy Scary from Casper and the Angels. The following year, Yogi's First Christmas featured Huck and others helping Yogi Bear prevent Jellystone Lodge's owner from tearing it down. In Yogi Bear's All Star Comedy Christmas Caper (1982), Huck drives in a van, bringing Snagglepuss, Hokey Wolf, Quick Draw McGraw, Augie Doggie and Doggie Daddy, and Snooper and Blabber to Jellystone Park, before discovering that Yogi and Boo-Boo have escaped to a department store.

The syndicated series The Funtastic World of Hanna-Barbera included a segment in 1985 called Yogi's Treasure Hunt; Huckleberry appeared alongside characters including Yogi and Boo-Boo, Ranger Smith, Quick Draw McGraw, Snagglepuss, Dick Dastardly and Muttley, and Top Cat. This show also debuted Huck's superhero alter-ego called "Huckle Hero". In 1987, Huck appeared in the television film Yogi Bear and the Magical Flight of the Spruce Goose, traveling around the world, saving animals and fending off the Dread Baron and Mumbly.

Huck's return to the spotlight was in the Western television film The Good, the Bad, and Huckleberry Hound (1988), where he is portrayed as a reluctant town sheriff who attempts to outwit the menacing Dalton Gang and falls in love with a Native American girl named Desert Flower, for whom he performs a different song "By the Light of the Silvery Moon". The same year, Huck was originally slated to make a cameo in the 1988 film Who Framed Roger Rabbit.

In the Wake, Rattle, and Roll (1990) segment, Fender Bender 500, Huck teams up with Snagglepuss in their monster truck called "Half Dog, Half Cat, Half Track" throughout the racecourses. The following year, Huck appeared as a teenager in the 1991 series Yo Yogi!, voiced by Greg Berg. One of his enemies, Wee Willie, was also featured as an adolescent, vocalized by Rob Paulsen. In 1997, Huck, along with other Hanna-Barbera characters including Fred Flintstone, Barney Rubble, Wilma Flintstone, Betty Rubble, Yogi Bear, Scooby-Doo and George Jetson, made appearances in the live show Hanna-Barbera Gala Celebrity Nite at the Australian amusement park Wonderland Sydney in 1997. Keith Scott provided the voices of all the characters (except Wilma and Betty) including Huck himself.

On June 11, 2000, Cartoon Network aired a short film called "Sound Hound" as part of a series of short animations called "Cartoon Network Shorties" that would eventually be moved with the short musical animations known as "Cartoon Network Groovies" to its other channel devoted to old classics, Boomerang. The short features Huckleberry as the lead character. Attempting to sing his signature song "Oh My Darling, Clementine", he is repeatedly interrupted by the sounds of New York City, like car horns, jackhammers, and birds, and a visibly irritated Huckleberry zips a radio host's mouth closed, interrupts a man and woman's phone calls, and silences two teenagers rocking in a car, all rendered with cutout animation. As he finally begins to sing, all the people he silenced begin to scream in agony, due to his singing being so terribly loud.

Huck appears in the series Jellystone!, voiced by Jim Conroy, as the mayor of Jellystone, with Mr. Jinks serving as his personal assistant. His voice in the series is more based on children's television host Fred Rogers. Huck is confirmed to be gay in the Season 3 episode "Disco Fever".

In terms of guest appearances, Huck made a cameo appearance in the Animaniacs segment "Suffragette City", and in 2000, appeared in The Simpsons episode "Behind the Laughter", voiced by Karl Wiedergott. Near the end of the episode, he confesses: "I was so gay, but I couldn't tell anyone". Huck briefly appeared in a MetLife commercial that aired in 2012, and in 2023, made several cameos in the Teen Titans Go! episode "Warner Bros. 100th Anniversary".

== In other media ==
- Huckleberry is the singing narrator of a parody recording of Lorne Greene's song, "Ringo", called "Bingo, Ringo" where the hound meets a man who appears to resemble The Beatles drummer, Ringo Starr, punctuated with considerable percussion.
- Huckleberry Hound in Hollywood Capers is a 1993 computer game for MS-DOS, Amiga, and Atari ST, released only in Europe. It was adapted from an earlier game, Dino Jr. in Canyon Capers.
- Huck appeared as a closeted dog who is Snagglepuss's friend and Quick Draw McGraw's lover in the six-issue comic book miniseries Exit, Stage Left!: The Snagglepuss Chronicles.
- Huck starred in Green Lantern/Huckleberry Hound Special #1, a crossover comic where he teams up with Green Lantern.
- Huck appears in The Freddy Funko Show as Freddy's co-host, voiced by Chris Finney.

== See also ==
- The Huckleberry Hound Show
  - List of The Huckleberry Hound Show episodes
- List of Hanna-Barbera characters
