= Laurel and Hardy (TV series) =

US animated television series based on Laurel and Hardy (1966–67)

- Genre: Comedy
- Voices of: Larry Harmon; Jim MacGeorge; Paul Frees; Allan Melvin; Don Messick; Hal Smith; Janet Waldo; Doug Young
- Narrated by: Paul Frees
- Theme music composer: Ted Nichols
- Opening theme: "Dance of The Cuckoos" (original) "Have A Party With Laurel And Hardy" (1990's airings)
- Country of origin: United States
- Original language: English
- No. of seasons: 1
- No. of episodes: 156

Production
- Producers: William Hanna; Joseph Barbera; David L. Wolper
- Running time: 5 minutes
- Production companies: Larry Harmon Pictures; David L. Wolper Productions; Hanna-Barbera Productions

Original release
- Release: September 10, 1966 – March 25, 1967

Laurel and Hardy is a 1966–1967 American animated comedy television series and an updated version of Stan Laurel and Oliver Hardy's comedic acts by the animation studio Hanna-Barbera and Larry Harmon Productions. Harmon had been developing the series since 1961, while Stan Laurel was still alive, although Laurel had very little involvement.

A total of 156 shorts were made, each having its own opening and closing wrap-arounds, to make them easy to air in syndication. As Oliver Hardy and Stan Laurel had died in 1957 and 1965 respectively, Jim MacGeorge provided the voice of Ollie, while Harmon voiced Stan. They would later reprise their roles in an episode of The New Scooby-Doo Movies.

The majority of the cartoons usually ended with Stanley whimpering in a high register whenever things went wrong for the both of them, as they were running away after causing the damages to their situations.

== Reception ==
The one-season show was not well received. Critic Leonard Maltin said, "To criticize these cartoons is pointless. Any imitation, even a good one, simply cannot be Laurel and Hardy... No one can duplicate Laurel and Hardy's greatness because they were unique."

== Voices ==
- Larry Harmon as Stan Laurel
- Jim MacGeorge as Oliver Hardy

Additional Voices: Paul Frees, Allan Melvin, Don Messick, Hal Smith, Janet Waldo, Doug Young

== Episodes ==
- 1. Can't Keep a Secret Agent
- 2. Mutt Rut
- 3. How Green Was My Lawn Mower
- 4. Prairie Panicked
- 5. Missile Hassle
- 6. No Moose Is A Good Moose
- 7. The Bullnick
- 8. High Fly Guys
- 9. False Alarms
- 10. Hillbilly Bully
- 11. Ball Maul
- 12. Handle with Care
- 13. You And Your Big Mouse
- 14. Sitting Roomers
- 15. Babes in Sea Land
- 16. Rome Roamers
- 17. Rocket Wreckers
- 18. Hot Rod Hardy
- 19. Knight Mare
- 20. Defective Story
- 21. Crash & Carry
- 22. Desert Knight
- 23. Tale of a Sale
- 24. Fancy Trance
- 25. Suspect in Custody
- 26. Auto-Matic Panic
- 27. Shiver Mr. Timbers
- 28. Stand Out, Stand In
- 29. Big Bear Bungle
- 30. Shrinking Shrieks
- 31. Mounty Rout
- 32. Bond Bombed
- 33. What Fur?
- 34. Spook Loot
- 35. Camera Bugged
- 36. Plumber Pudding
- 37. Robust Robot
- 38. Vet Fret
- 39. Copper Bopper
- 40. Feud For Thought
- 41. Love Me, Love My Puppy
- 42. Squawking Squatter
- 43. Goofy Gopher Goof-Up
- 44. Sassy Sea Serpent
- 45. Wacky Quackers
- 46. Truant Ruined
- 47. Country Buzzin'
- 48. Naps & Saps
- 49. Bad Day In Baghdad
- 50. The Missing Fink
- 51. Always Leave 'Em Giggling
- 52. Badge Budgers
- 53. Two for the Crow
- 54. Good Hoods
- 55. Animal Shelter
- 56. Tragic Magic
- 57. Ring-A-Ding King
- 58. Ups & Downs
- 59. Beanstalk Boobs
- 60. Leaping Leprechaun
- 61. Tourist Trouble
- 62. The Genie Was Meanie
- 63. Mars Little Helper
- 64. Curfew For Kids
- 65. Lion Around
- 66. Shoot-Down at Sundown
- 67. Horse Detectives
- 68. The Two Musketeers
- 69. Ali Boo Boo
- 70. Ghost Town Clowns
- 71. Hurricane Hood
- 72. Ride and Seek
- 73. Tee Pee TV
- 74. Shoe-Shoe Baby
- 75. Train Strain
- 76. Monster Bash
- 77. Say Uncle, Ants
- 78. Kitty Pity
- 79. Frigid-Ray-Gun
- 80. Southern Hospital-Ity
- 81. Frog Frolic
- 82. Shutter Bugged
- 83. Circus Run Aways
- 84. Witch Switch
- 85. Pie in the Sky
- 86. Slipper Slip-Up
- 87. Sign of the Times
- 88. Two Many Cooks
- 89. Flea's A Crowd
- 90. Dingbats
- 91. We Clothe at Five
- 92. The Stone Age Kid
- 93. Quick Change
- 94. Whing Ding
- 95. Termite Might
- 96. To Bee or Not to Bee
- 97. Mistaken Identi-Tree
- 98. Rodeo Doug
- 99. Pet Shop Polly
- 100. Laff Staff
- 101. Try and Get It
- 102. Riverboat Detectives
- 103. Unhealthy Wealthy
- 104. Honesty Always Pays
- 105. Plant Rant
- 106. Sky-High Noon
- 107. Get Tough
- 108. Handy Dandy Diary
- 109. Jumpin Judo
- 110. They Take The Cake
- 111. Gold Storage
- 112. Lots of Bad Luck
- 113. Kangaroo Kaper
- 114. The Finks Robbery
- 115. Strictly for the Birds
- 116. Birds of a Feather
- 117. Bird Brains
- 118. Switcheroony
- 119. Mechanical Mess-Up
- 120. Horsey Sense
- 121. Bowling Boobs
- 122. Dog Tired
- 123. Wayout Campers
- 124. Goofer Upper Golfers
- 125. My Friend the Inventor
- 126. Hard Day's Work
- 127. Sky-Scraper-Scape
- 128. Sleepy King
- 129. Fair Play
- 130. Fly Foot Flat Feet
- 131. Baboon Tycoon
- 132. A Real Live Wife
- 133. Wishy Washy Fishy Tale
- 134. Stuporman
- 135. Wheel and Deal Seal
- 136. Wolf in Sheep's Clothing
- 137. Lumber Jerks
- 138. That's Snow Biz
- 139. A Clothes Call
- 140. Boot Hill Bill
- 141. Stop Action Faction
- 142. Molecule Rule
- 143. Peek A Boo Pachyderm
- 144. Mummy Dummy
- 145. Nitey Knight
- 146. Fly Spy
- 147. Franken-Stan
- 148. A Real Tycoon
- 149. Puppet Show Down
- 150. Madcap Mischief
- 151. Secret Agents 000
- 152. Flight of the Bumble-Brains
- 153. Salt Water Daffy
- 154. From Wrecks to Riches
- 155. Truant or Consequences
- 156. Flipped Van Winkles

== Comic book ==
From 1969–1974, Thorpe & Porter in the United Kingdom published a color comic book series based on the Laurel & Hardy cartoon, which lasted 141 issues plus eight extra large issues.

In 1972, DC Comics published a single issue of a comic book series based on the Laurel and Hardy cartoon series. The cover for the unpublished second issue appears in The DC Vault.

== Home media ==
The series has been made available in VHS and DVD formats over the last 35 years.

=== VHS ===
- Congress Video Group released two volumes in 1986 consisting of the following entries:
  - Volume 1 – "Can't Keep a Secret Agent", "How Green Was My Lawn Mower", "Handle With Care", "Camera Bugged", "Plumber Pudding", "Robust Robot".
  - Volume 2 – "Copper Bopper", "Feud For Thought", "Love Me, Love My Puppy", "Squawking Squatter", "Goofy Gopher Goof-Up", and "Sassy Sea Serpent".
- Video Gems released the first 20 episodes on VHS over two volumes in 1988:
  - Crash and Carry – episodes 1-10
  - Can't Keep a Secret Agent – episodes 21-30
- Parkfield Entertainment released three volumes in 1988.
  - Volume 1 – episodes 51-60, 71-72
  - Volume 2 – episodes 61-70, 73-74
  - Volume 3 – episodes 81-96
- Gemini Entertainment LTD released 12 entries in 1991 as Always Leave 'Em Giggling

=== DVD ===
The complete series was released on DVD in France in November 2012; it included 68 episodes in English with French subtitles.

== See also ==
- List of works produced by Hanna-Barbera Productions
- List of Hanna-Barbera characters
- The New 3 Stooges
- The Abbott and Costello Cartoon Show
- The New Scooby-Doo Movies
