= Yogi's Treasure Hunt =

American animated television series

- Genre: Adventure; Mystery; Comedy
- Directed by: Oscar Dufau (season 1); Bill Hutten (season 1); Tony Love (season 1); Alan Zaslove (seasons 1–2); Rudy Zamora (seasons 1, 3); Don Lusk (season 2); Carl Urbano (season 2); Art Davis (season 3); Charlie Downs (season 3); Paul Sommer (season 3)
- Voices of: Daws Butler; Don Messick; Arnold Stang; John Stephenson; Paul Winchell
- Theme music composer: Hoyt Curtin; Gary Grant; Jerry Hey
- Opening theme: "Funtastic Treasure Hunt", performed by Jon Bauman & The Funtastic Singers from The Funtastic World of Hanna-Barbera
- Ending theme: "Funtastic Treasure Hunt" (Instrumental)
- Composer: Hoyt Curtin
- Country of origin: United States
- Original language: English
- No. of seasons: 3
- No. of episodes: 27

Production
- Executive producers: William Hanna; Joseph Barbera
- Producers: Bob Hathcock (seasons 1–2); Charles Grosvenor (season 3)
- Editor: Gil Iverson
- Running time: 19 minutes
- Production company: Hanna-Barbera Productions

Original release
- Network: First-run syndication (The Funtastic World of Hanna-Barbera)
- Release: September 6, 1985 – March 25, 1988

Yogi's Treasure Hunt is an American animated television series, and the fifth entry in the Yogi Bear franchise, produced by Hanna-Barbera Productions. Featuring Yogi Bear and various other Hanna-Barbera characters, it premiered in syndication on September 6, 1985 as part of The Funtastic World of Hanna-Barbera. This is the last series to feature Daws Butler as the voice of Yogi Bear and his other characters before his death in 1988. While all 27 episodes were made in digital ink and paint across three seasons, its opening credits were produced in traditional cel animation.

== Plot ==
Yogi and his friends Boo-Boo Bear, Huckleberry Hound, Quick Draw McGraw, Snagglepuss, Augie Doggie and Doggie Daddy, and Snooper and Blabber, are assigned by Top Cat to go on treasure hunts around the world with Ranger Smith serving as their field commander who also makes sure that Yogi does his part in the treasure hunts. They travel aboard their ship the S.S. Jelly Roger and solve different riddles that would lead them to the treasure in question. Dick Dastardly and Muttley travel on their ship, the S.S. Dirty Tricks, and try to beat Yogi and friends to the treasure by engaging in their usual dirty tricks.

== Voice cast ==
=== Main voices ===
- Daws Butler – Yogi Bear, Huckleberry Hound, Augie Doggie, Quick Draw McGraw, Snagglepuss, Snooper and Blabber, Wally Gator, Mr. Jinks, Peter Potamus (in "Yogi's Beanstalk"), Baba Looey, Hokey Wolf, Lippy the Lion, Undercover Elephant (in "Search for the Moaning Liza," "Yogi's Heroes"), Yippee Coyote (in "The Return of El Kabong")
- Don Messick – Boo Boo, Ranger Smith, Muttley, Narrator, Touché Turtle (in "Search for the Moaning Liza"), Ruff, Ricochet Rabbit (in "Snow White & the 7 Treasure Hunters"), President of Amnesia (in "Secret Agent Bear")
- Arnold Stang – Top Cat
- John Stephenson – Doggie Daddy, Officer Dibble (in "Yogi & the Beanstalk"), The President of Rhubarbia (in "Secret Agent Bear"), Magnifico the Great, King Tutti-Frutti (in "The Curse of Tutti-Frutti")
- Paul Winchell – Dick Dastardly

=== Additional voices ===
- Charlie Adler (seasons 2 & 3) – Greed Monster (in "The Greed Monster")
- Jon Bauman (season 2) – Theme Song Performer
- Julie Bennett (season 3) – Cindy Bear (in "Secret Agent Bear"), United Nations Speaker (in "The Attack of Dr. Mars")
- Susan Blu (season 3) – Nathan (in "The Greed Monster")
- Julie Brown (season 3) – Connie Kindly (in "Yogi Bear on the Air")
- Hamilton Camp (season 3) – Mike Walnuts (in "20,000 Leaks Under the Sea")
- Pat Carroll (season 2) – Evil Queen (in "Snow White & the 7 Treasure Hunters")
- Vance Colvig (season 2) – Chopper (in "Snow White & the 7 Treasure Hunters")
- Walker Edmiston (season 3)
- Dick Erdman (season 1) – Happy Bing (in "Yogi and the Unicorn")
- Teresa Ganzel (season 3) – Receptionist (in "The Greed Monster")
- Linda Gary (season 2) – Lady Creampuff (in "The Case of the Hopeless Diamond")
- Dick Gautier (season 1) – Inka-Dinka Tribal Chief (in "The Attack of Dr. Mars")
- Rebecca Gilchrist (season 3)
- Arlene Golonka (season 1)
- Bob Holt (season 1)
- Stacy Keach, Sr. (season 1) – Dinky Dalton (in "The Return of El Kabong")
- Gail Matthius (season 1) – Square Rock (in "Riddle in the Middle of the Earth")
- Edie McClurg (season 2) – Dr. Mars (in "The Attack of Dr. Mars") and Sally's Mom (in "The Attack of Dr. Mars")
- Allan Melvin (season 2) – Magilla Gorilla (in "Search for the Moaning Liza")
- Rob Paulsen (seasons 1 & 2) – Hansel (in "Yogi and the Unicorn")
- Joni Robbins (season 1) – Magic Mirror (ep. "Merlin's Lost Book of Magic")
- David Ruprecht (season 3)
- Michael Rye (season 2)
- Ann Ryerson (seasons 1 & 3)
- Marilyn Schreffler (season 2) – Penelope Pitstop as Snow White (in "Snow White and the Seven Treasure Hunters") and Sally (in "The Attack of Dr. Mars")
- Mimi Seton (season 3)
- Andre Stojka (season 1) – Professor Whobigone Sprock (in "Riddle in the Middle of the Earth")
- Russi Taylor (season 3) – Girl (in "The Greed Monster"), Luke (in "The Greed Monster"), Mother (in "The Greed Monster")
- Jean Vander Pyl (seasons 2 & 3) – Ma Rugg (in "Search for the Moaning Liza," "Yogi's Beanstalk")
- Janet Waldo (season 1) – Cindy Bear (in "To Bee or Not To Bee"), Little Red Riding Hood (in "Yogi and the Unicorn"), Gretel (in "Yogi and the Unicorn") and the Candy House Witch (in "Yogi and the Unicorn")
- Lennie Weinrib (season 2) – The Pink Pussycat (in "Search of the Moaning Liza"), Homer Gazelle (in "Search for the Moaning Liza")
- Jimmy Weldon (seasons 2 & 3) – Yakky Doodle (in "Snow White & the 7 Treasure Hunters," "Yogi's Beanstalk")
- Frank Welker (seasons 2 & 3) – The President (in "The Great American Treasure"), College Dean (in "Goodbye, Mr. Chump"), Jabberjaw (in "Goodbye, Mr. Chump"), Ziltch (in "Heavens to Planetoid"), Good Night Show Host (in "The Great American Treasure"), Gorilla (in "Bungle in the Jungle"), Leon the Lion (in "Bungle in the Jungle"), Leon's Son (in "Bungle in the Jungle")
- Jonathan Winters (season 1) – Ollie the Red-Nosed Viking (in "Ollie the Red-Nosed Viking")

== Episodes ==
=== Series overview ===
Season	Episodes	Originally released	
Season	Episodes	First released	Last released
1	10	September 6, 1985	November 8, 1985
2	8	November 7, 1986	January 16, 1987
3	9	November 6, 1987	March 25, 1988

=== Season 1 (1985) ===
No. overall	No. in season	Title	Story by	Original release date
1	1	"Riddle in the Middle of the Earth"	George Atkins	September 6, 1985
Yogi and his friends sail on the SS Jelly Roger in search of "The Diamond Orb" located in the Earth's core.
2	2	"Bungle in the Jungle"	Tom Ruegger	September 13, 1985
Yogi and his friends sets out for an uncharted island off the coast of Africa where a treasure called "The Golden Gorilla" has the power to stop its volcano from erupting.
3	3	"Countdown Drac"	Alex Lovy; Chuck Couch; Earl Kress	September 20, 1985
Top Cat sends the gang to Transylvania, where it is rumored to be the resting place of the vampire Count Dracula.
4	4	"The Return of El Kabong"	Earl Kress	September 27, 1985
Quick Draw goes back to his old crime-fighting identity of El Kabong, thus allowing him to get one up on the other teams and be the first to find the treasure, until Dastardly and Muttley show up.
5	5	"Ole the Red Nose Viking"	George Atkins	October 4, 1985
Yogi and his friends find "The Chalice of Valhalla" in an old Viking settlement.
6	6	"The Curse of Tutti-Frutti"	John K. Ludin	October 11, 1985
While hunting for "The Mummy Case of King Tutti-Frutti", Quick Draw, Snagglepuss and Doggie Daddy become possessed by a curse of greed and now everyone must find the treasure to reverse the spell.
7	7	"Yogi and the Unicorn"	Earl Kress	October 18, 1985
Top Cat assigns the gang to travel to the Land of Fairy Tales in search for "The Mythical Gold Unicorn" and protect it from a mean greedy circus ringmaster named Happy Bing, as well as Dick Dastardly and Muttley.
8	8	"The Case of the Hopeless Diamond"	John K. Ludin	October 25, 1985
Told by Snooper, the treasure the team must find this time is "The Hopeless Diamond Ring", a possession of Lady Creampuff, but every time they seem to have found it, it turns out to be a fake. Simultaneously, Yogi is mistaken for a bear criminal resembling himself and gets arrested, leading the rest of the boys to help him get out.
9	9	"Merlin's Lost Book of Magic"	Tony Fuller; John K. Ludin	November 1, 1985
While in London, Yogi and the class search for "Merlin's Lost Book of Magic". Then Dick Dastardly and Muttley steal it so they can use it to try to get to the treasure first.
10	10	"Beverly Hills Flop"	Earl Kress	November 8, 1985
Top Cat sends the gang to Hollywood after a jewel statue named "The Emerald Flamingo", used in a movie of the same name.

=== Season 2 (1986–87) ===
No. overall	No. in season	Title	Story by	Original release date
11	1	"Follow the Yellow Brick Gold"	Jack Hanrahan; John K. Ludin	November 7, 1986
Top Cat gives the gang clues in Ireland to look for "The Pot of Gold" to donate to a children's home, which is on the brink of financial crisis.
12	2	"To Bee or Not to Bee"	Peter Anderegg; Chuck Couch	November 14, 1986
The gang arrives at Cindy Bear's Honey Farm, where they learn that Cindy's bees have mysteriously stopped honey production (Snooper states the bees are on "a 'permanent' coffee break"). Cindy's mortgage payment is almost due, and with no honey, Cindy has gone bankrupt and is at great risk of losing her farm. In order to save her farm from closing down, the gang looks for "The Pirate Treasure of Jacques Latoot".
13	3	"Heavens to Planetoid"	Gordon Bressack	November 21, 1986
Yogi and his friends ventures into deep space in search of "The Murgatroyd Ruby", which is actually the remains of what was once the planet Murgatroyd.
14	4	"Beswitched, Buddha'd and Bewildered"	John K. Ludin	December 5, 1986
While in Japan, Dick Dastardly's latest contraption causes everyone to swap bodies, causing confusion and non-cooperation while trying to find "The Jade Buddha".
15	5	"There's No Place Like Nome"	Earl Kress; Tom Ruegger	December 12, 1986
On the trail of "The Giant Gold Nugget" lost in Nome, Alaska, Yogi's class overcomes a town's chilly reception.
16	6	"The Great American Treasure"	John K. Ludin	January 2, 1987
Guest starring on The Good Night Show, Top Cat tells how he formed the treasure hunting team, in which Yogi and his gang found out the great American treasure isn't actually treasure.
17	7	"Huckle Hero"	Tom Ruegger	January 9, 1987
When the gang get captured, it's up to Huckleberry (with the use of his new superhero alter ego, Huckle Hero) to save the day.
18	8	"The Moaning Liza"	George Atkins	January 16, 1987
In a parody of The Pink Panther, a criminal named the Pink Pussycat (who's identical to Snagglepuss) arrives and steals the painting The Moaning Liza from the Louvre Museum in Paris. Undercover Elephant holds a press conference where he announces that Yogi's Treasure Hunters are on the case.

=== Season 3 (1987–88) ===
No. overall	No. in season	Title	Written by	Original release date
19	1	"Snow White & the 7 Treasure Hunters"	Earl Kress; John Ludin; Tom Ruegger	November 6, 1987
Told in storybook-format by Chopper and Yakky Doodle, Yogi and his friends protect Snow White (Penelope Pitstop) from Dick Dastardly, Muttley, and the Evil Queen while her Seven Dwarfs are on vacation.
20	2	"Yogi's Heroes"	John K. Ludin	November 13, 1987
Top Cat announces Dicaragua and Bearzil, two countries ruled by Dick Dastardly and Yogi, respectively, are on the brink of war. To make matters worse, the Crown Jewels of Bearzil have gone missing. Absent: Ranger Smith
21	3	"The Attack of Dr. Mars"	Charles M. Howell, IV; John Ludin; Tom Ruegger	November 20, 1987
A female Martian, Dr. Mars, makes a special intergalactic guest appearance at the United Nations claiming the Earth will be destroyed... unless a treasure chest (which is really a time bomb), called "The Big Dipper Booty" (lost somewhere in the Beach), is returned to her. Absent: Ranger Smith
22	4	"20,000 Leaks Under the Sea"	Earl Kress	December 4, 1987
The team searches for sunken treasure, while putting up with a snobby talk show host named Mike Walnuts, host of 16 Minutes. Note: This episode is a parody of the CBS nightly news program 60 Minutes.
23	5	"Goodbye, Mr. Chump"	Wayne Kaatz	December 11, 1987
Yogi and the class are called in to save a college on the brink of financial crisis. Absent: Ranger Smith
24	6	"Yogi Bear on the Air"	Reed Robbins; Earl Kress	February 5, 1988
Top Cat informs the gang that the TV Zone's "Golden Transmitter" (which is used to air TV programs) has gone missing and goes on the hunt to find it. Note: This episode features parodies of Hill Street Blues, Siskel & Ebert, Mister Rogers' Neighborhood, Star Trek, Star Wars and The Smurfs (a sister Hanna-Barbera series to Yogi's Treasure Hunt)
25	7	"Yogi and the Beanstalk"	Dan Gilvezan	February 12, 1988
Yogi and the gang find themselves in the story of Jack and the Beanstalk where they assist Hokey Wolf in rescuing a missing harp from a giant version of Peter Potamus while competing with Dick Dastardly and Muttley.
26	8	"The Greed Monster"	Story by : Tom Ruegger; Teleplay by : Wayne Kaatz	February 19, 1988
Told through rhyme, Yogi and his friends depict how all the toys in the world disappear, mysterious flute music draws toys away from their homes to a distant planet. Absent: Ranger Smith
27	9	"Secret Agent Bear"	Earl Kress; Kent Zbornak	March 25, 1988
Yogi and friends are secret agents attempting to stop Dick Dastardly from discovering the Fountain of Youth and use its power to transform everyone on the planet into children. However, Dick crashes their boat, which flings them into the fountain and turns them into toddlers. Absent: Ranger Smith Note: The opening of this episode parodies the iconic opening of the James Bond movies.

== Home media ==
Hanna-Barbera Home Video released the episodes "The Curse of Tutti-Frutti" (which is retitled "Raiders of the Lost and Found") "To Bee or Not to Bee", "Heavens to Planetoid", "There's No Place Like Nome", "The Moaning Liza" (which is retitled "The Search for the Moaning Lisa") and "The Greed Monster" on individual VHS tapes in the Spring of 1990, to promote the opening of The Funtastic World of Hanna-Barbera simulator movie ride at Universal Studios Florida.

The tapes opened with a promo for the ride and a trailer for Jetsons: The Movie. They also included a trivia question before the credits and a Yogi Bear short at the end as a bonus.

== Trivia ==
The show's original working title was The Funtastic Treasure Hunt.

== In other languages ==
- Arabic: الدب يوغي- فريق المهمات الصعبة (Yogi Bear: The Tough Mission Team)
- Japanese: ハンナ・バーベラ秘宝探検団 (Hanna Bābera Hihō Tanken-Dan) (Hanna-Barbera Treasure Hunters)
- Italian: La caccia al tesoro di Yoghi (Same as English title)
- Brazilian Portuguese: Zé Colmeia e os Caça-Tesouros (Yogi Bear and the Treasure Hunters)
- European Portuguese: A Caça ao Tesouro do Zé Colmeia (Yogi Bear's Treasure Hunt)
- Latin American Spanish: Yogui y la búsqueda del tesoro (Yogi and the Treasure Hunt)

== See also ==
- List of works produced by Hanna-Barbera
