= Loopy De Loop =

American animated theatrical short series

- Title card
- Directed by: William Hanna; Joseph Barbera
- Written by: Michael Maltese; Warren Foster; Tony Benedict; Dalton Sandifer
- Produced by: William Hanna; Joseph Barbera
- Starring: Daws Butler
- Music by: Hoyt Curtin (musical director)
- Production company: Hanna-Barbera Productions (Note: The rights to the individual characters are presently owned by Warner Bros.)
- Distributed by: Columbia Pictures
- Running time: 7 minutes per short
- Country: United States
- Language: English

Loopy De Loop is an American animated theatrical series produced and directed by William Hanna and Joseph Barbera after leaving MGM and opening their new studio, Hanna-Barbera Productions. 48 cartoons were produced between 1959 and 1965, and released to theatres by Columbia Pictures. It was one of the final theatrical cartoon series to be released by Columbia, as well as the only one to be produced by the studio.

== Overview ==
Loopy (voiced by Daws Butler) is a gentleman wolf from Canada who speaks English with a marked Québecois accent, and always wears a characteristic tuque knit cap and scarf. A self-appointed good Samaritan, he dauntlessly fights to clear the bad name of wolves and opens every short with his trademark introduction "I am Loopy De Loop, the good wolf." Though he is always kind and helpful, his exploits usually get him beaten up or chased out of town by the very people he has helped, all for no other reason than the prejudice of being a wolf. Still, he never loses faith, and considers himself "kind, considerate and charming."

The character's name is a combination of plays on words:

- "Loop the loop" is a 360-degree back flip performed by airplane stunt pilots.
- Canis lupus is the Latin-based scientific name for the grey wolf species of the dog family, with the species' name of lupus being the basis for loup, the French word for wolf.
- "Loopy" is a synonym for "crazy" or "eccentric"

== List of theatrical shorts ==
=== 1959 ===
No.	Title	Written by	Animated by	Release date	PN
1	"Wolf Hounded"	Michael Maltese	Ken Muse	November 5, 1959	4701
A nice Québecois accented wolf named Loopy De Loop who recalls the true story of Little Red Riding Hood (voiced by June Foray) in which he rescued her basket from the Three Little Pigs, but sustained multiple injuries and charmed Grandma (also voiced by June Foray).
2	"Little Bo Bopped"	Michael Maltese	Ken Muse	December 3, 1959	4702
Loopy tries to help Little Bo Peep (voiced by Jean Vander Pyl) by finding her sheep lost in a large flock guarded by a sheepdog. Then it is the sheepdog that returns the lost sheep instead.

=== 1960 ===
No.	Title	Written by	Animated by	Release date	PN
3	"Tale of a Wolf"	Warren Foster	Carlo Vinci	March 3, 1960	4703
Loopy tries to give wolf-kind a good reputation, but his efforts get him into multiple beat ups from a watch dog (who bears a resemblance to Quick Draw McGraw's dog Snuffles and voiced by Paul Frees).
4	"Life with Loopy"	Warren Foster	Lewis Marshall	April 7, 1960	4704
Loopy tells a therapist a story of how he tried to fit in as a wolfdog pet. It worked until he confessed to his master (voiced by Don Messick) he was an actual wolf. Afterwards, the therapist realizes that Loopy is a wolf and drives him out of his office with his gun.
5	"Creepy Time Pal"	Warren Foster	Carlo Vinci	May 19, 1960	4705
Loopy goes off to save Hansel and Gretel (voiced by Jean Vander Pyl and Don Messick) from the witch's gingerbread house, despite their refusal.
6	"Snoopy Loopy"	Warren Foster	Ken Muse	June 16, 1960	4706
Loopy tries to deliver a baby gorilla (voiced by Don Messick) to the zoo, but it keeps running off and causing trouble for Loopy.
7	"The Do-Good Wolf"	Warren Foster	Ken Muse	July 14, 1960	4707
Loopy assists Snow White (voiced by Jean Vander Pyl) and she moves into the house of the Seven Dwarfs who don't trust wolves.
8	"Here Kiddie, Kiddie"	Warren Foster	Ken Muse	September 1, 1960	5702
Loopy is a zoo wolf and keeps getting blamed for taking a mother's baby by her and the zookeeper (voiced by Don Messick).
9	"No Biz Like Shoe Biz"	Warren Foster	Carlo Vinci	September 8, 1960	5701
In a take-off of Cinderella, Loopy plays "fairy godmother" to a young woman (voiced by Jean Vander Pyl) who is not invited to a ball and wants to see the prince (voiced by Don Messick).

=== 1961 ===
No.	Title	Written by	Animated by	Release date	PN
10	"Count Down Clown"	Warren Foster	Dick Lundy	January 5, 1961	5703
Thinking he is not needed by anyone, Loopy joins a space program and participates in tests by going to the Moon.
11	"Happy Go Loopy"	Warren Foster	Ed Love	March 2, 1961	5704
Loopy goes to a masquerade party and is mistaken for a guy named "Charlie" in a wolf costume; Loopy livens the party up by doing impressions of Maurice Chevalier, Peter Lorre, Ed Sullivan and Jimmy Durante.
12	"Two Faced Wolf"	Warren Foster	George Nicholas	April 6, 1961	TBA
Loopy unknowingly befriends a scientist (voiced by Hal Smith) who turns into a monster on and off without Loopy knowing that the monster is really him.
13	"This Is My Ducky Day"	Michael Maltese	Bill Keil	May 4, 1961	TBA
After despairing about how his good deeds do not pay, Loopy raises a duck (voiced by Red Coffey). Even that does not improve matters for Loopy.
14	"Fee Fie Foes"	Michael Maltese	Robert Bentley	June 9, 1961	TBA
A take-off on Jack and the Beanstalk where Loopy participates in the well-known fairy tale by climbing a beanstalk by bringing back Jack (voiced by Don Messick) to his mother (voiced by Jean Vander Pyl) and meets the giant.
15	"Zoo Is Company"	Michael Maltese	George Nicholas	July 6, 1961	TBA
Loopy helps an elephant (who sounds like Wally Gator) with a mouse problem and that mouse is Bigelow Mouse (voiced by Doug Young).
16	"Child Sock-Cology"	Tony Benedict	Dick Lundy	August 10, 1961	TBA
Loopy encounters a lost giant gorilla baby (voiced by Don Messick) and brings him back to the zoo.
17	"Catch Meow"	Tony Benedict	George Nicholas	September 14, 1961	TBA
Loopy unsuccessfully tries to negotiate a peace between a cat and a mouse (both voiced by Don Messick). But when it works, it doesn't improve matters for the duo.
18	"Kooky Loopy"	Warren Foster	Jack Ozark	November 16, 1961	TBA
Loopy meets The Big Bad Wolf (voiced by Arnold Stang) of the Little Red Riding Hood story and wants him to be a good wolf.
19	"Loopy's Hare-do"	Warren Foster	Bob Carr	December 14, 1961	TBA
Loopy volunteers to be a hunter's (voiced by Don Messick) hunting dog and at the same time protect the rabbit. By the time the hunting is well, the hunters spots a $50 wolf bounty opportunity.

=== 1962 ===
No.	Title	Written by	Animated by	Release date
20	"Bungle Uncle"	Michael Maltese	Jack Ozark	January 18, 1962
Loopy's nephew Bon-Bon keeps taking a lamb from a swearing watchdog (voiced by Don Messick) and he thinks Loopy keeps taking the lamb.
21	"Beef For and After"	Michael Maltese	Dick Lundy	March 1, 1962
Loopy's nephew Bon-Bon again takes another animal from the swearing watchdog (voiced by Don Messick), this time, a cow and blames Loopy for taking the cow (voiced by Doug Young).
22	"Swash Buckled"	Michael Maltese	Jack Ozark	April 5, 1962
In France, Loopy meets the four musketeers and one of them goes to rescue a princess (voiced by Jean Vander Pyl) and Loopy goes with him to see him in action.
23	"Common Scents"	Tony Benedict	Dick Lundy	May 10, 1962
Loopy protects a skunk (voiced by Mel Blanc, uncredited) on the verge of suicidal tendencies. The skunk stops this when he meets a girl skunk (voiced by Julie Bennett) with equal sorrows.
24	"Bearly Able"	Michael Maltese	Jack Ozark	June 28, 1962
Without Goldilocks, the Three Bears leave it to Loopy to babysit their baby bear, who makes Loopy's job a difficult one.
25	"Slippery Slippers"	Warren Foster	Jack Ozark	September 7, 1962
Loopy helps Prince Charming (voiced by Arnold Stang) find his beloved Cinderella (voiced by Jean Vander Pyl). After various mistakes, Loopy's search is successful.
26	"Chicken Fraca-See"	Dalton Sandifer	Carlo Vinci	October 11, 1962
After a fox (voiced by Doug Young) steals a chicken egg from the swearing watchdog (voiced by Don Messick), it hatches a baby chick (also voiced by Don Messick) which follows Loopy calling him "Mama" and the watchdog keeps thinking Loopy is the chicken thief.
27	"Rancid Ransom"	Dalton Sandifer	Dick Lundy	November 15, 1962
Out west, Loopy does two good deeds and a bounty hunter (voiced by Don Messick) goes after him for money.
28	"Bunnies Abundant"	Dalton Sandifer	George Nicholas	December 13, 1962
Loopy protects an army of rabbits from a hungry wolf (voiced by Doug Young).

=== 1963 ===
No.	Title	Written by	Animated by	Release date
29	"Just a Wolf at Heart"	Dalton Sandifer	Jack Ozark	February 14, 1963
Valentine's Day: Loopy is crazy in love with a cute girl wolf named "Gaga" (voiced by Jean Vander Pyl) and she wants him to bring her sheep from his sheepdog friend (voiced by Don Messick).
30	"Chicken Hearted Wolf"	Warren Foster	Don Patterson	March 14, 1963
Loopy tries to prove wolves can be good and tries to teach a lesson to chicken thief Sam Wolf (voiced by Doug Young) about stealing chickens from a farmer (voiced by Don Messick).
31	"Watcha Watchin'?"	Dalton Sandifer	Bob Carr	April 18, 1963
The watchdog (voiced by Don Messick) (who is friends with Loopy?) is tired after staying out all night and falls asleep on watch duty and Loopy attempts to help him keep his job.
32	"A Fallible Fable"	Dalton Sandifer	Jack Ozark	May 16, 1963
When the Big Bad Wolf walks out on a Little Red Riding Hood re-enactment, Loopy stands in for him unaware of how serious the other actors take the story.
33	"Sheep Stealers Anonymous"	Dalton Sandifer	George Nicholas and George Goepper	June 13, 1963
Loopy helps wolves be cured of sheep-stealing and helps Sam Wolf (who was in "Chicken Hearted Wolf" with a different design and voice and is voiced by Doug Young) be cured of sheep, but he keeps taking sheep from the swearing watchdog (voiced by Don Messick).
34	"Wolf in Sheep Dog's Clothing"	Tony Benedict	Bill Keil	July 11, 1963
With the watchdog sick, a farmer (voiced by Don Messick) hires Loopy to be a watchdog. Loopy poses as one and must stop another wolf from stealing sheep.
35	"Not In Nottingham"	Dalton Sandifer	Jack Ozark	September 5, 1963
Robin Hood (voiced by Don Messick) sends Loopy on a mission to rescue Maid Marian from the Nottingdoing Castle, but Loopy blunders and takes out the Sheriff of Nottingham's (also voiced by Don Messick) wife.
36	"Drum-Sticked"	Michael Maltese	Jack Ozark	October 3, 1963
On Thanksgiving, Loopy protects a turkey (voiced by Doug Young) from a farmer and his dog (both voiced by Don Messick) who always says "Shee" whenever the farmer doesn't notice what's going on with Loopy hiding him.
37	"Bear Up!"	Michael Maltese	Jerry Hathcock and Ken Muse	November 7, 1963
Loopy is minding his own business out in the woods until he comes across The Three Bears and their baby keeps wandering off and they keep assuming Loopy is taking their baby.
38	"Crook Who Cried Wolf"	Dalton Sandifer	Don Patterson	December 12, 1963
Loopy comes across a pair of crooks hiding in his cave and they mistake him for "Big Louie" thinking he's in a wolf mask.
39	"Habit Rabbit"	Michael Maltese	Bill Keil and George Goepper	December 31, 1963
Loopy helps cure a rabbit named Raymond (voiced by Howard Morris) of his crazy carrot addiction which worries his wife, but not his daughter (both voiced by Janet Waldo) who keeps skipping rope.

=== 1964 ===
No.	Title	Written by	Animated by	Release date
40	"Raggedy Rug"	Michael Maltese	Dick Lundy	January 2, 1964
A hunter named Quincy (voiced by Don Messick) promises his wife Genevieve (voiced by Jean Vander Pyl), by bringing back an animal rug for her and does it by not blasting Loopy, but his dog (also voiced by Don Messick) suspects Loopy is alive.
41	"Elephantastic"	Michael Maltese	Ed Parks and Chuck Harriton	February 6, 1964
Loopy helps deliver the elephant from "Zoo Is Company"(who is green this time) to the circus from a hunter and encounters Bigelow the mouse (voiced by Doug Young) again who antagonises the elephant.
42	"Bear Hug"	Michael Maltese	George Nicholas and Bill Keil	March 5, 1964
Loopy helps a bear named Braxton (voiced by Mel Blanc) who has a mad, crazy jealous streak to win over his girlfriend Emmy-Lou (voiced by Janet Waldo) who has other suitors. After some rivaling with Loopy, Braxton falls for Emmy-Lou's cousin, Jenny-Lee (also voiced by Janet Waldo).
43	"Trouble Bruin"	Michael Maltese	Ken Muse and Jerry Hathcock	September 17, 1964
The second short subject to feature Loopy helping Braxton (voiced by Mel Blanc) cure his insane jealously problem of Emmy-Lou (voiced by Nancy Wible) having other suitors coming in her home.
44	"Bear Knuckles"	Michael Maltese	George Nicholas and George Goepper	October 15, 1964
Braxton (voiced by Mel Blanc) wants to propose to Emmy-Lou (voiced by Janet Waldo), but his jealousy kicks in once more, and it's Loopy to the rescue again.

=== 1965 ===
No.	Title	Written by	Animated by	Release date
45	"Horse Shoo"	Michael Maltese	Don Patterson	January 7, 1965
Twister, a rodeo horse (voiced by Doug Young) who sounds like Doggie Daddy, thinks that his rodeo owner (voiced by Hal Smith) is getting rid of him cause he's no good no more, so he runs into Loopy and he tries hiding him out from his rodeo owner.
46	"Pork Chop Phooey"	Dalton Sandifer	Jack Ozark	March 18, 1965
Loopy's nephew Bon-Bon reads a story of the Three Little Pigs and goes out to find them where he tries to blow down their houses. Loopy tries to stop him, but he only makes things worse.
47	"Crow's Fete"	Dalton Sandifer	Ed Aardal and Chuck Harriton	April 14, 1965
When Farmer Brown (voiced by Mel Blanc) goes crazy after attempting to catch a corny crow (also voiced by Mel Blanc), Loopy attempts to get him, but he messes with poor Loopy.
48	"Big Mouse Take"	Michael Maltese	Carlo Vinci and Hugh Fraser	June 17, 1965
Unable to deal with Bigelow Mouse (voiced by Doug Young), Chatterly Cat accepts Loopy's help. After a successful mouse catch, both Chatterly and Bigelow with his family move in with Loopy.

== Television version ==
In 1969, Loopy's film shorts were gathered together into a syndicated television series, simply titled Loopy de Loop.

== Cast ==
- Daws Butler as Loopy De Loop
- Other voices include Julie Bennett, Mel Blanc, Red Coffey, June Foray, Paul Frees, Don Messick, Howard Morris, Hal Smith, Arnold Stang, Jean Vander Pyl, Janet Waldo, Nancy Wible, and Doug Young.

== Other appearances ==
- A brief scene from "Two Faced Wolf" appears in The Monkees' film Head.
- Loopy appeared in the 1991 NBC series Yo Yogi!, voiced by Greg Burson. He appears as an employee and owner of The Picnic Basket at Jellystone Mall's food court.
- Loopy appeared in the Harvey Birdman, Attorney at Law episode "Juror in Court". He escapes from the prison along with many Harvey's clients, when his cases are sent to the review. It is unknown why he was there because he never appeared in the show before and was not a client of Harvey. Loopy also appears in a recap of the previous episode in "The Death of Harvey".
- A genderbend version of Loopy appears in the Max show Jellystone! voiced by Ulka Simone Mohanty in a French accent. In contrast to the classic version's optimistic outlook, Loopy here is equipped with a more cynical and deadpan personality. She works with Jabberjaw in Magilla Gorilla's haberdashery.

== Home media ==
On September 9, 2014, Warner Home Video (via Warner Archive) released Loopy De Loop: The Complete Collection on DVD in Region 1 as part of their Hanna–Barbera Classics Collection.

On February 24, 2026, Warner Archive released the complete series on Blu-ray.

== In other languages ==
- Italian: Lupo de Lupis
- Brazilian Portuguese: Loopy Le Beau
- Portuguese: similar to English
- Spanish: Loopy de Loop, el lobo bueno
- Finnish: Hurmaava Hukka
- Serbian: Лупи Добрић, добри вук (Lupi Dobrić, dobri vuk)
