= List of The Huckleberry Hound Show episodes =

The following is an episode list for the American animated television series The Huckleberry Hound Show, which was produced by Hanna-Barbera Productions. Each episode of the first two seasons comprises a Huckleberry Hound cartoon, a Pixie and Dixie and Mr. Jinks cartoon, and a Yogi Bear cartoon. In seasons three and four, Hokey Wolf cartoons replace the Yogi Bear segments since he was getting his own spin-off series in 1961.

The series was originally sponsored by Kellogg's through its advertising agency, Leo Burnett. The air dates varied in each city, depending on what day and time slot the Burnett agency was able to buy. The dates for the first season below are based on when an episode aired for the first time; that was on a Monday in some cities, though the same episode would have been seen, for example, in Los Angeles on Tuesday and New York on Thursday.

== Series overview ==
At present, the first season has been released on DVD by Warner Home Video. The complete series was released on blu-ray by Warner Archive on August 26th, 2025.

Season	Segments	Episodes	Originally released	
Season	Segments	Episodes	First released	Last released
1	66	26	September 29, 1958	March 23, 1959
2	39	13	September 14, 1959	February 22, 1960
3	39	13	September 11, 1960	December 4, 1960
4	34	16	August 18, 1961	December 1, 1961

== Episodes ==
- HH = Huckleberry Hound
- PDJ = Pixie and Dixie and Mr. Jinks
- YB = Yogi Bear
- HW = Hokey Wolf

Note: Some episodes repeat cartoons from earlier episodes. In the following list, —rr— denotes a previously-aired (rerun) cartoon.

=== Season 1 (1958–59) ===
No. overall	No. in season	Cartoons: HH / PDJ / YB	Original release date
1	1	"Huckleberry Hound Meets Wee Willie / Cousin Tex / Yogi Bear's Big Break"	September 29, 1958
HH – Huckleberry Hound Meets Wee Willie: Huckleberry Hound seeks a 350-pound gorilla named Wee Willie who is loose in the city. PDJ – Cousin Tex: Pixie and Dixie's cousin Tex arrives from Texas, and proves to be more than a match for Jinks, who in turn summons his cousin Pecos. YB – Yogi Bear's Big Break: Tired of being patronized by tourists, Yogi tries to break out of Jellystone Park. He finally succeeds, only to want back in to avoid bear hunters.
2	2	"Lion-Hearted Huck / Judo Jack / Slumber Party Smarty"	October 6, 1958
HH – Lion-Hearted Huck: Huck goes to Africa to bag a lion but the lion uses all sorts of modern devices to outwit Huck. Finally, the brainy lion is himself bested by a jeep motor. PDJ – Judo Jack: Pixie and Dixie call upon Judo Jack to teach them how defend themselves against Jinks in the arts of Judo. YB – Slumber Party Smarty: Yogi's hibernation is hindered by a troublesome duckling.
3	3	"Tricky Trapper / Kit Kat Kit / Pie-Pirates"	October 13, 1958
HH – Tricky Trapper: Northwest Mounted Police Officer Huckleberry Hound tries to capture the fugitive Powerful Pierre. PDJ – Kit Kat Kit: Jinks builds a robot cat to take care of Pixie and Dixie. Their efforts against it don't work until they make it think Jinks is a mouse. YB – Pie-Pirates: This is the earliest example of Yogi craving human food, as he tries to get around a dog to steal a pie from someone's home.
4	4	"Sir Huckleberry Hound / Jinks' Mice Device / Big Bad Bully"	October 20, 1958
HH – Sir Huckleberry Hound: To rescue a fair maiden in distress, Huck the brave knight must defeat the Black Night. PDJ – Jinks' Mice Device: Jinks builds a machine he thinks will liquidate Pixie and Dixie. It makes the mice invisible and they drive Jinks mad with their tricks. YB – Big Bad Bully: Hungry bears Yogi and Boo-Boo must outsmart a bull to access a honey-bearing beehive.
5	5	"Sheriff Huckleberry / Pistol Packin' Pirate / Foxy Hound-Dog"	October 27, 1958
HH – Sheriff Huckleberry: Huck goes out to bring in Dinky Dalton the desperado. Dinky turns out to be a giant and Huck is able to capture him only after some fast thinking. PDJ – Pistol Packin' Pirate: On a pirate ship, the captain threatens to make Jinks walk the plank if Pixie and Dixie are not taken care of. YB – Foxy Hound-Dog: Yogi protects a little fox from a hunter and his yowping dog until hunting season ends.
6	6	"Rustler Hustler Huck / Scaredycat Dog / The Brave Little Brave"	November 3, 1958
HH – Rustler Hustler Huck: Huckleberry Hound must protect his cattle from a rustler in the Old West. The rustler is a tricky one, but so is Huck. PDJ – Scaredycat Dog: Pixie and Dixie buy a dog for $5 to get Jinks, but the dog is scared of cats. The dog's twin brother then comes to the rescue. YB – The Brave Little Brave: Yogi is forced to protect a young Native American boy on his first hunt.
7	7	"Freeway Patrol / Little Bird-Mouse / Tally Ho Ho Ho"	November 10, 1958
HH – Freeway Patrol: Police Officer Huckleberry Hound, at the wheel of a squad car, is ordered to bring in a fleeing bank robber. PDJ – Little Bird-Mouse: Dixie picks up a flying talent and uses it to save Pixie and their teacher from Jinks, who tries to catch Dixie for a lot of money. YB – Tally Ho Ho Ho: Yogi tricks a hunter during bear hunting season and raids a refrigerator for the first time.
8	8	"Cock-A-Doodle Huck / Jiggers... It's Jinks! / High Fly Guy"	November 24, 1958
HH – Cock-A-Doodle Huck: Farmer Huckleberry Hound meets a foxy fox discovered prowling in Huck's hen house. PDJ – Jiggers... It's Jinks!: Pixie, Dixie and Jinks live happily in a cheese factory. Jinks is replaced by a cat named Bullet. All three try creative ways to get back in. YB – High Fly Guy: Yogi tries to help a newborn eagle get off the ground and discovers that "flyin' is strictly for the birds!"
9	9	"Two Corny Crows / The Ghost with the Most / Baffled Bear"	November 27, 1958
HH – Two Corny Crows: Farmer Huckleberry Hound is losing rows on rows of his corn crop to Iggy and Ziggy, a pair of crafty black birds who manage to outwit Huck at every turn. PDJ – The Ghost with the Most: Jinks thinks he killed Dixie. Dixie dresses as a ghost to haunt Jinks and get him to obey him. Jinks finds out and plays his own trick. YB – Baffled Bear: While Yogi hibernates one winter, the forest he is in gets turned into a highway laden with traffic that may strand him permanently if none of his gadgets or trickery work.
10	10	"Huckleberry Hound Meets Wee Willie / The Ace of Space / Big Brave Bear"	December 1, 1958
HH – -rr-:A repeat of "Huckleberry Hound Meets Wee Willie". PDJ – The Ace of Space: After being chased by Jinks, Dixie dreams he meets Captain Micetro and becomes an invader against Jinks. YB – Big Brave Bear: Two bank robbers, so vicious that the Highway Patrol has a "shoot to kill" order against them, think they can hide in Yogi's cave.
11	11	"Fireman Huck / Jinks Junior / Yogi Bear's Big Break"	December 8, 1958
HH – Fireman Huck: Huckleberry Hound is assigned by his boss, the fire chief, to rescue a kitten chased up a tree by a lively dog. PDJ – Jinks Junior: Jinks tries to teach his boy, Jinks Junior, to catch mice. He is slow at learning but after success, hasn't learned about relationship with dogs. YB – -rr-: A repeat of "Yogi Bear's Big Break".
12	12	"Dragon-Slayer Huck / Cousin Tex / The Stout Trout"	December 15, 1958
HH – Dragon-Slayer Huck: Sir Huck is reluctant to ride forth in search of the fire-breathing dragon which has terrified the realm. PDJ – -rr-:A repeat of "Cousin Tex". YB – The Stout Trout: Yogi tries to catch a trout, but the trout is having none of it.
13	13	"Lion-Hearted Huck / Jinks the Butler / The Buzzin' Bear"	December 22, 1958
HH – -rr-:A repeat of "Lion-Hearted Huck". PDJ – Jinks the Butler: Jinks is under orders to guard a banquet. Pixie and Dixie try incessantly to crash the party, until Jinks plants a firecracker in an apple. YB – The Buzzin' Bear: Yogi wants to fly the park's helicopter, but can't land it.
14	14	"Hookey Daze / Jinks' Flying Carpet / Slumber Party Smarty"	December 29, 1958
HH – Hookey Daze:Truant Officer Huckleberry has to get the hooky-playing Vanderblip kids to school, but it proves to be quite a challenge. PDJ – Jinks' Flying Carpet: Jinks receives a package with a flying carpet. He tries it out on Pixie and Dixie but he loses it out of the window. YB – -rr-: A repeat of "Slumber Party Smarty".
15	15	"Skeeter Trouble / Judo Jack / The Runaway Bear"	January 5, 1959
HH – Skeeter Trouble: Huck's attempt to enjoy a camping trip to the great outdoors is thwarted by a mosquito, assisted by skeeter buddies that even follow the beleaguered blue hound underwater. PDJ – -rr-:A repeat of "Judo Jack". YB – The Runaway Bear: A big game hunter wants Yogi's head as a trophy on his wall when he flees away from a circus on roller-skates.
16	16	"Tricky Trapper / Puppet Pals / Be My Guest Pest"	January 12, 1959
HH – -rr-:A repeat of "Tricky Trapper". PDJ – Puppet Pals: After his usual chase routine, Jinks befriends Bow Wow. Pixie and Dixie decide to break up their friendship, but fail. YB – Be My Guest Pest: Yogi takes up the offer of a tourist's invite to visit his New York apartment, but has to avoid his wife.
17	17	"Sheep-Shape Sheepherder / Mark of the Mouse / Pie-Pirates"	January 19, 1959
HH – Sheep-Shape Sheepherder: A crafty wolf uses a younger wolf to distract Sheepherder Huck so he can attack the lambs. But Huck is not to be distracted. None of the wolf's other ruses, including the use of blasting powder, keep Huck from attending to his duties and the hound emerges triumphant. PDJ – Mark of the Mouse: Dixie attempts to scare Jinks with a Mark of the Mouse costume. Jinks plays along, but then he duels the real Mark of the Mouse. YB – -rr-: A repeat of "Pie-Pirates".
18	18	"Barbecue Hound / Kit Kat Kit / Duck in Luck"	January 26, 1959
HH – Barbecue Hound: Huck tries to barbecue a steak but a dog keeps stealing it. PDJ – -rr-:A repeat of "Kit Kat Kit". YB – Duck in Luck: Yogi has to protect Biddy Buddy from a hunter and Yowp, the yowping dog.
19	19	"Sir Huckleberry Hound / Dinky Jinks / Bear on a Picnic"	February 2, 1959
HH – -rr-:A repeat of "Sir Huckleberry Hound". PDJ – Dinky Jinks: Jinks mixes a formula that shrinks him to mouse size. He fails to get Pixie and Dixie and seeks their help from a chasing dog. YB – Bear on a Picnic: Yogi has to keep an eye on a wandering baby, but his good deeds are met with violence from the baby's ignorant parents . . . and a mountain lion who Yogi fears has evil intent against the child.
20	20	"Hokum Smokum / Hypnotize Surprise / Big Bad Bully"	February 9, 1959
HH – Hokum Smokum: Grandpappy Huck Hound tells his grandson about his days as an Indian fighter. He is delighted to hear Grandpappy say he won the West singlehandedly, until the truth is told. PDJ – Hypnotize Surprise: Pixie and Dixie try some hypnotism on Jinks. It all goes wrong when they make Jinks think he's a mouse and he makes himself a train. YB – -rr-: A repeat of "Big Bad Bully".
21	21	"Bird House Blues / Jinks' Mice Device / Prize Fight Fright"	February 16, 1959
HH – Bird House Blues: Huckleberry Hound, nature loving citizen that he is, builds a bird house atop a pole. To Huck's dismay, crows move in instead of gentle songbirds, and Huck suffers several mishaps in his attempts to evict them. PDJ – -rr-: A repeat of "Jinks' Mice Device". YB – Prize Fight Fright: For a free meal ticket, Yogi takes on a boxing champion.
22	22	"Postman Panic / Nice Mice / Brainy Bear"	February 23, 1959
HH – Postman Panic: A ferocious watchdog bars Huck's way while he is trying to deliver a letter. Huck tries all sorts of tricks to get the mail through. When he finally does make the delivery, he discovers the letter should go next door. As he departs, the guardian canine phones his bulldog pal next door to alert him. PDJ – Nice Mice: Pixie and Dixie helps a dumped kitten. Jinks tries to stop the mice taking his milk. When he sees the kitten, he takes over caring for it. YB – Brainy Bear: Yogi is lured by a crazy scientist into a brain experiment.
23	23	"Ski Champ Chump / King-Size Surprise / Robin Hood Yogi"	March 2, 1959
HH – Ski Champ Chump: Huckleberry Hound and Powerful Pierre compete for the ski championship. PDJ – King-Size Surprise: Pixie and Dixie help a dog called King-Size retrieve his license. In return, he helps them against Jinks until he is taken by a dog catcher. YB – Robin Hood Yogi: Yogi turns to archery to get food, a la Robin Hood.
24	24	"Lion Tamer Huck / Cat-Nap Cat / Daffy Daddy"	March 9, 1959
HH – Lion Tamer Huck: Persistent Huckleberry Hound has read a book on lion taming and is undaunted by the lion. Huck tries to enter the lion's cage with comically disastrous results. PDJ – Cat-Nap Cat: Jinks has been rewarded for mouse catching. Knowing his secret, Pixie and Dixie decide to interrupt his cat nap. YB – Daffy Daddy: Yogi gets harassed by a small, cowboy-crazy child whose parents ignore him.
25	25	"Little Red Riding Huck / Mouse-Nappers / Scooter Looter"	March 16, 1959
HH – Little Red Riding Huck: The Little Red Riding Hood story is given a decidedly new twist. Grandma calls the police and accuses Huck of false impersonation and trying to spoil the story. PDJ – Mouse-Nappers: A cat takes Pixie and Dixie away and Jinks begins a fight with him until both of them share the mice. YB – Scooter Looter: Yogi goes joy riding on a scooter throughout Jellystone, which he can't stop.
26	26	"The Tough Little Termite / Boxing Buddy / Hide and Go Peek"	March 23, 1959
HH – The Tough Little Termite: Huckleberry Hound encounters a termite that eats not only the wood in Huck's house, furniture and station wagon, but even the metal airplane in which Huck is trying to escape. PDJ – Boxing Buddy: Pixie and Dixie meet a kangaroo named Ka-Pow, who Jinks mistakes for an oversized mouse. Ka-Pow is soon reclaimed to star on television. YB – Hide and Go Peek: Yogi helps an escaped circus elephant hide from two ruthless guards.

=== Season 2 (1959–60) ===
No. overall	No. in season	Cartoons: HH / PDJ / YB	Original release date
27	1	"Ten Pin Alley / Hi-Fido / Show Biz Bear"	September 14, 1959
HH – Ten Pin Alley: Huckleberry Hound is bowling against Powerful Pierre for the world title. Huck is a sure loser because of Pierre's unfair tactics, until one of Pierre's tricks misfires and Huck walks off with the championship. PDJ – Hi-Fido: Pixie and Dixie try to scare Jinks with ventriloquism, which soon stops working... until it summons a bulldog in the house. YB – Show Biz Bear: After a movie company begins filming in Jellystone Park, the director offers a role to starstruck Yogi.
28	2	"Grim Pilgrim / Rapid Robot / Lullabye-Bye Bear"	September 21, 1959
HH – Grim Pilgrim: Pilgrim Huckleberry Hound stalks a turkey with his musket, which becomes complicated with the arrival of a Native American. PDJ – Rapid Robot: Jinks gets a cat robot to catch Pixie and Dixie for him. To get even, the mice get a dog robot; in the end, both robots cause chaos. YB – Lullabye-Bye Bear: Yogi tries to stay awake all winter.
29	3	"Jolly Roger and Out / Sour Puss / Bare Face Bear"	September 28, 1959
HH – Jolly Roger and Out: Huckleberry Hound as Admiral Horatio Huckleberry is sent by Parliament to bring back Jolly Roger, the scourge of the seas. He succeeds when he discovers Rogers' weakness: he's ticklish. PDJ – Sour Puss: Jinks is thrown out by the house butler after disposing of Pixie and Dixie. Jinks gets them back, but the butler takes his job shortly. YB – Bare Face Bear: A jewel thief puts on a bear suit to hide out in Jellystone Park. A lawman and his bloodhound Ole Yelp pursue him. Yogi, fooled by the thief's disguise, helps him elude his pursuers. The jewel thief is caught and the credit goes to Yogi, to the chagrin of Ole Yelp who was the only one not fooled by the thief's disguise.
30	4	"Somebody's Lion / King Size Poodle / Papa Yogi"	October 26, 1959
HH – Somebody's Lion: Huck Hound, the big game hunter, makes the mistake of declaring, on a TV interview program, that he is off to capture Leroy, the cleverest lion in the jungle. Leroy is waiting for Huck with a fantastic collection of tricks and gadgets. PDJ – King Size Poodle: Pixie and Dixie disguise an escaped lion as a giant poodle, who misleads Jinks to protect his cover. YB – Papa Yogi: Yogi and Boo Boo disguise themselves to attend a "fathers and sons" picnic in Jellystone Park, much to the displeasure of Ranger Smith.
31	5	"A Bully Dog / Mighty Mite / Stranger Ranger"	November 2, 1959
HH – A Bully Dog: Huck is delivering a telegram. He gets to the house only to be harassed by the watch dog. After being tormented, he discovers the message is not to the dog's master, but a birthday greeting to the watchdog himself, and Huck must sing it. PDJ – Mighty Mite: Pixie and Dixie invite Champion Rooster El Puncho in their house, who then gives Jinks a punching fight. YB – Stranger Ranger: Yogi thinks that a gorilla wearing a ranger's uniform is working for the vacationing Ranger Smith.
32	6	"Nottingham and Yeggs / Bird Brained Cat / Rah Rah Bear"	November 23, 1959
HH – Nottingham and Yeggs: Robin Huck is stealing from the rich and giving to the poor. Men with similar ideals flocked to join Robin Huck In Sherwood Forest. Then all changed as Robin claimed a rich inheritance. PDJ – Bird Brained Cat: When the neighbors leave their pet canary with Jinks' owners while they're away, Jinks comes down with a serious case of what he calls "canaryitis". He turns to Pixie and Dixie for help in resisting catching the canary. YB – Rah Rah Bear: Yogi's favorite football team gets a new star when Yogi appears in the gridiron lineup!
33	7	"Huck the Giant Killer / Batty Bat / Bear for Punishment"	November 30, 1959
HH – Huck the Giant Killer: Huckleberry Hound, the expert and imperturbable giant exterminator of the realm, looks over his schedule for the day and finds he will have time for one giant before the closing hour. PDJ – Batty Bat: Jinks keeps Pixie and Dixie cloistered, when Dixie's cousin, Batty, arrives to help them. Jinks' every attempt to get Batty is futile. YB – Bear for Punishment: Yogi makes a magician turn him and Boo-Boo invisible so they can steal picnic baskets.
34	8	"Cop and Saucer / Lend-Lease Meece / Nowhere Bear"	December 21, 1959
HH – Cop and Saucer: Officer Huckleberry Hound tries to give a ticket for a parking violation to a gibberish-speaking Martian who has parked his saucer in a no-parking zone. PDJ – Lend-Lease Meece: A new cat, Charlie, moves in next door, whom Jinks quickly befriends. When Charlie informs Jinks that the new house has no mice yet, Jinks sends Pixie and Dixie over to Charlie's place until Charlie gets mice of his own. YB – Nowhere Bear: After faking being hypnotized by Ranger Smith, Yogi hypnotizes Boo Boo into thinking he's a bird, and soon Boo Boo needs to be rescued from a nest.
35	9	"Pony Boy Huck / A Good, Good Fairy / Wound-Up Bear"	December 28, 1959
HH – Pony Boy Huck: Huckleberry Hound is the pony express rider, who lives up to the motto of the mail must go through. Huck lives through all sorts of experiences as Chief Crazy Coyote tries to capture and prevent him from crossing the Indian domain. PDJ – A Good, Good Fairy: Pixie and Dixie rely on a fairy mouse godmother to take care of the bullying Jinks. She plays tricks on him, until he feels unwell. YB – Wound-Up Bear: Yogi disguises Boo Boo, then himself, as wind-up toys to get goodies -- producing a mystery for Ranger Smith.
36	10	"Pet Vet / Heavens to Jinksy / Bewitched Bear"	January 18, 1960
HH – Pet Vet: Dr. Huckleberry Hound is the finest veterinarian in the land and he is particularly skilled as a dentist. Huck tries to carry out the most difficult task he has encountered in his years of practice. PDJ – Heavens to Jinksy: In an unconscious dream, Jinks is on a thin line between the afterlifes, but has a chance to make up for antagonizing Pixie and Dixie. YB – Bewitched Bear: Yogi steals a witch's broom to steal picnic baskets in aerial raids.
37	11	"Piccadilly Dilly / Goldfish Fever / Hoodwinked Bear"	January 25, 1960
HH – Piccadilly Dilly: Huckleberry Hound is instructed to apprehend Picadilly Dilly. Dilly has a blood-curdling laugh and the ability to change himself into a Mr. Hyde-like character at will. He outwits not only London Bobby Huck but also Huck's boss. PDJ – Goldfish Fever: Jinks tries to catch the neighbor's goldfish, whilst running into the bulldog. Pixie and Dixie tries to snap Jinks out of his obsession. YB – Hoodwinked Bear: Yogi intervenes in the story of Little Red Riding Hood to help rescue Granny from the wolf.
38	12	"Wiki Waki Huck / Pushy Cat / Snow White Bear"	February 15, 1960
HH – Waki Waki Huck: Huck is a beach-boy, travelogue commentator, and host of a Hawaiian luau. When the baby pig with an apple in its mouth, realizes Huck intends to use him as part of the feast, rather than as guest of it, the pig escapes. PDJ – Pushy Cat: A cat, claiming to be Jinks' buddy, Arnold, barges in; Arnold's true intention, however, is to catch Pixie and Dixie. YB – Snow White Bear: Yogi and Boo Boo's winter sleep is interrupted by the characters from "Snow White."
39	13	"Huck's Hack / Puss in Boats / Space Bear"	February 22, 1960
HH – Huck's Hack: Taxi driver Huckleberry Hound's passenger is a bank robber. Huck takes his customer to the bank, waits at the curb while he robs it and carries him safely to his hideout. PDJ – Puss in Boats: Pixie and Dixie depart for vacation, but Jinks can't bear to part with them. When the mice begin to feel homesick, they call for Jinks' help. YB – Space Bear: An alien disguises himself as Yogi and terrorizes Jellystone with a disintegration gun.

=== Season 3 (1960) ===
No. overall	No. in season	Cartoons: HH / PDJ / HW	Original release date
40	1	"Spud Dud / High Jinks / Tricks and Treats"	September 11, 1960
HH – Spud Dud: Professor Huckleberry Hound is called on by the nation's leaders to save mankind from an Idaho potato, which has not only eyes but also a brain and is terrorizing the citizens. PDJ – High Jinks: Jinks forces Pixie and Dixie to take part in his project of going to the moon; Jinks then has to rescue them from a cheese factory. HW – Tricks and Treats: Hokey and Ding-A-Ling set up Farmer Smith to gain free food handouts. Hokey then summons the news press to ensure his success.
41	2	"Legion Bound Hound / Price for Mice / Hokey Dokey"	September 18, 1960
HH – Legion Bound Hound: Sergeant Huckleberry Hound of the Foreign Legion sets out to bring in Powerful Pierre, the renegade scourge of the desert. Pierre nearly bests Huckleberry, but loses when Huckleberry opens a door, just as Pierre is about to ram it. PDJ – Price for Mice: Jinks tricks Pixie and Dixie into getting painted white, so he can sell them to a lab. His curiosity soon gets him on a launch to the moon. HW – Hokey Dokey: Hokey and Ding-A-Ling go house hunting. Hokey scares the three little pigs out of their house, but the pigs and the Big Bad Wolf teach him a lesson.
42	3	"Science Friction / Plutocrat Cat / Lamb-Basted Wolf"	September 25, 1960
HH – Science Friction: Chief Plumbottom of Scotland Yard assigns Inspector Huckleberry Hound to go to the quiet little town of Shropshire and investigate the terrifying sounds emanating from an abandoned castle. PDJ: Plutocrat Cat: Pixie and Dixie move to a rich cat's place to escape from Jinks. While Jinks is lonesome, some luxuries disagree with the mice. HW – Lamb-Basted Wolf: After Hokey reads Ding-A-Ling the story of "The Boy who Cried Wolf", Hokey uses the idea to nab some sheep, but his plans backfire on him.
43	4	"Nuts Over Mutts / Pied Piper Pipe / Which Witch Is Which"	October 2, 1960
HH – Nuts Over Mutts: The kindly city dogcatcher, humane Huckleberry Hound tries to capture Duffy, a madcap canine, to provide food and shelter for the pitiful beast. But Duffy has seen dogcatchers come and go. PDJ – Pied Piper Pipe: Jinks picks up the idea from a book of controlling Pixie and Dixie with a pipe. In turn, the two trick him with a dog whistle. HW – Which Witch Is Which: Hokey and Ding-A-Ling nibble a witch's gingerbread house but she drives them away. She then summons them back for her stew, but the wolves escape with her broom.
44	5	"Knight School / Woo for Two / Pick a Chick"	October 9, 1960
HH – Knight School: After many ordeals Huckleberry Hound earns membership as a Knight of the Round Table. When cards are drawn to see which knight must go slay a newly-arrived dragon, Huck is high with a three. PDJ – Woo for Two: Jinks is in love with Brigette. To his surprise, she's engaged to another cat. Pixie and Dixie try to sort the problem out. HW – Pick a Chick: Hokey and Ding-A-Ling go to raid the farmer's hen house. First, they have to trick watchdog Douglas. Little do they know is that the farmer wants to be rid of those chickens.
45	6	"Huck Hound's Tale / Party Peeper Jinks / Robot Plot"	October 16, 1960
HH – Huck Hound's Tale: Buffalo Huck sees his popularity wane. What's worse, attendance at the Wild West Show is falling off. It' s because Crazy Coyote has jumped the reservation and defied Buffalo Huck to come get him. PDJ – Party Peeper Jinks: After Jinks rejects Pixie and Dixie from his party, Rocky decides to teach Jinks' a lesson, which makes Jinks distrust his invited friends. HW – Robot Plot: A chicken farmer fed up with Hokey's egg snatching, makes a robot to dispose of him. After a brief chase, Hokey reprograms the robot to get the farmer.
46	7	"The Unmasked Avenger / A Wise Quack / Boobs in the Woods"	October 23, 1960
HH – The Unmasked Avenger: The masked Purple Pumpernickle (Huck) battles a fiendish, tax-imposing lord. PDJ – A Wise Quack: Jinks sends a duckling out of the house, but Pixie and Dixie convince him to save the duckling from the duck hunting season. HW – Boobs in the Woods: Alternative title to "Bean Pod'ners".
47	8	"Hillbilly Huck / Missile Bound Cat / Castle Hassle"	October 30, 1960
HH – Hillbilly Huck: Huck gets involved in a mountain feud between his ancestors and the Doodleberrys. PDJ – Missile Bound Cat: Jinks insists to Pixie and Dixie, that "Space Cat" is the only TV show. Space Cat arrives to take Jinks to his planet where Jinks changes his priorities. HW – Castle Hassle: Hokey and Ding-A-Ling explore a castle, empty except for the cacophonic Evil Queen. When the Queen sends the wolves to deliver an apple to Snow White at the house of the Seven Dwarfs, they sabotage her plan.
48	9	"Fast Gun Huck / Kind to Meeces Week / Booty on the Bounty"	November 6, 1960
HH – Fast Gun Huck: Huck, the fastest gun in the West, brings in Teeny Terwilliger, the second-fastest gun in the West. PDJ – Kind to Meeces Week: Spike tries to convince Jinks it is "Be Kind to Animals Week". When Jinks gets the message, Pixie and Dixie take advantage of this. HW – Booty on the Bounty: Hokey and Ding-A-Ling turn themselves over to an assistant warden for the reward bounty followed by a bail. They repeat this scheme many times successfully.
49	10	"Astro-nut Huck / Crew Cat / Hokey in the Pokey"	November 13, 1960
HH – Astro-nut Huck: Scientists gather to hear from that super scientist, Huck Hound. When Professor Huck tells the group he is ready to send a man into space and needs a volunteer, the room empties and Huck finds himself alone. PDJ – Crew Cat: Jinks takes Pixie and Dixie aboard ship to get the job of ship's cat. Knowing they've been used, the mice deliver payback to Jinks. HW – Hokey in the Pokey: Two thieves have stolen a valuable painting and hide in Hokey's cave. Ten months later they try to take the painting from the wolves at gunpoint until the wolves turn over to the police.
50	11	"Huck and Ladder / Jinxed Jinks / Who's Zoo"	November 20, 1960
HH – Huck and Ladder: Firefighter Huck helps a circus owner to recapture a gorilla on the loose. PDJ – Jinxed Jinks: Jinks gets Pixie and Dixie an insurance policy, for his own personal gain. He tries to get the mice in an accident but runs into one of his own. HW – Who's Zoo: Hokey and Ding-A-Ling go to the lion cage at the zoo to try to get the meat from the lion. After several failed attempts, they join up in the wolf cage.
51	12	"Lawman Huck / Light Headed Cat / Dogged Sheep Dog"	November 27, 1960
HH – Lawman Huck: Huckleberry Hound is performing all the duties for the derelict sheriff, who considers most duties beneath him. When Dinky Dolton is put in Huck's charge, Dinky's seven brothers, who all come to rescue Dinky. PDJ – Light Headed Cat: Jinks has applied for a job, which unknown to him will have his gravity removed. A monkey keeps Jinks in anti-gravity for a long time. HW – Dogged Sheep Dog: Hokey convinces a sheep dog to train Ding-A-Ling as a sheep dog in order to steal a lamb. But the training is hindering Hokey's attempts.
52	13	"Cluck and Dagger / Mouse for Rent / Too Much to Bear"	December 4, 1960
HH – Cluck and Dagger: The secret agency's top operative is the man of the thousand faces, Huck Hound. Huck is to deliver a case of top secrets to our ambassador in Rutabaga. Huck buys a ticket on the spy train headed for Rutabaga. PDJ – Mouse for Rent: Jinks starts up a renting service, where cats can rent Pixie and Dixie. When the business starts to prosper, the mice take over. HW – Too Much to Bear: Hokey and Ding-A-Ling go the Three Bears house to acquire their food and beds under the pretext of detective work, until they are met with the house burglar Light fingers Louie.

=== Season 4 (1961) ===
No. overall	No. in season	Cartoons: HH / PDJ / HW	Original release date
53	1	"Caveman Huck / Jinks' Jinx / Movies Are Bitter Than Ever"	August 18, 1961
HH – Caveman Huck: Huckleberry Hound leaves his prehistoric cave in search of dinosaur meat for his hungry prehistoric dog, so he sets his sights on a big dinosaur. Unfortunately for Caveman Huck, the dinosaur has other plans. PDJ – Jinks' Jinx: When Jinks' old pal Howard visits, the two begin having fun with Pixie and Dixie, who take it upon themselves to convince Jinks that Howard brings bad luck. HW – Movies Are Bitter Than Ever: Hokey uses a movie set to sneak out some sheep being herded by a sheep dog. The farmer and sheep dog wise up to the wolves' trick and chase after them.
54	2	"Huck of the Irish / Fresh Heir / Poached Yeggs"	August 25, 1961
HH – Huck of the Irish: News photographer Huckleberry Hound is assigned by Strife Magazine to go to Ireland to photograph the never-before photographed Leprechaun. PDJ – Fresh Heir: Jinks has inherited from Mrs. Smithers an old mansion and moves in, leaving Pixie and Dixie behind. The two mice make the place haunted to scare Jinks into going back home. HW – Poached Yeggs: Hokey and Ding-A-Ling capture a fire-breathing dragon and turn him into a prince to kiss Sleeping Beauty. But things don't turn out right for the dragon and wolves.
55	3	"Jungle Bungle / Strong Mouse / Rushing Wolf Hound"	September 1, 1961
HH – Jungle Bungle: Jungle Huck lives in the jungle, swings from tree to tree, saves baby monkeys from hungry lions, and summons elephants with his piercing jungle call. Persuaded to demonstrate before the camera, things don't seem to go right. PDJ – Strong Mouse: Jinks is taken to meet Master cat Gus, while Pixie and Dixie's cousin Hercules comes and unknowingly saves Jinks' bacon from Gus. HW – Rushing Wolf Hound: A farmer buys an exotic watchdog called Wau-Wau who hates wolves. After many failed attempts, Hokey turns the watchdog against the farmer.
56	4	"Bullfighter Huck / Bombay Mouse / The Glass Sneaker"	September 8, 1961
HH – Bullfighter Huck: Bullfighter Huckleberry Hound never looked handsomer than at the moment he entered the ring. Outfought and outwitted by his opponent in the Plaza do Toros, Senor Huckleberry decides that the bull has never attended bullfighting school. PDJ – Bombay Mouse: An Indian mouse, Tabu, meets Pixie and Dixie and demonstrates some magic on Jinks. Tabu leaves a few magic tricks behind as he departs. HW – The Glass Sneaker: Prince Charming hires Hokey and Ding-A-Ling as detectives to track down Cinderella. He overlooks her and tangles with her two stepsisters before giving her the glass sneaker.
57	5	"Ben Huck / Mouse Trapped / Indian Giver"	September 15, 1961
HH – Ben Huck: Ben Huck took a beating from the Mad Barbarian. It was so bad Ben hid disguised as a statue in Rome. A travel narrator who discovers his secret, is sworn by Huckleberry to silence because the Mad Barbarian is still searching for him. PDJ – Mouse Trapped: Jinks builds a robot mouse dame to get Pixie and Dixie to squabble over her affection. When they see through the trick, they use the robot mouse against Jinks. HW – Indian Giver: The young Indian Hiawatha hunts down Hokey and eventually brings him back to his tribe.
58	6	"Huck de Paree / Magician Jinks / Chock Full Chuck Wagon"	September 22, 1961
HH – Huck de Paree: While Gendarme Huck is on patrol in Paris, Powerful Pierre robs a bank. PDJ – Magician Jinks: Jinks receives a magic kit. With it he makes Pixie and Dixie, disappear. The mice aided by a bulldog, get even with him. HW – Chock Full Chuck Wagon: Hokey attempts to get close to a Chuck wagon to swipe some of the sheriff's food. Just when the wolves drive the sheriff away, marauding buffalo drive them away.
59	7	"Bars and Stripes / Meece Missiles / Bring 'Em Back a Live One"	September 29, 1961
HH – Bars and Stripes: Huckleberry Hound is the warden of Alkatrash Prison, which no man has ever escaped. Nowhere outside of the walls will the inmates find the luxuries he provides. There's a waiting list to enjoy the food, the swimming pool and the theater inside. PDJ – Meece Missiles (PDJ): Jinks tries to dispose of Pixie and Dixie in a balloon. The mice are tailed by the air force and broadcast on TV. HW – Bring 'Em Back a Live One: After falling for one of Hokey's tricks, Farmer Smith hires a professional hunter and his hunting dog to capture Hokey alive. Sure enough, there's no escape from the hunter.
60	8	"The Scrubby Brush Man / Homeless Jinks / A Star is Bored"	October 6, 1961
HH – The Scrubby Brush Man: Nobody has been able to sell brushes to the householders of the 13th district. The company's top sales genius, Huckleberry Hound, is sent out to the terrible 13th. PDJ – Homeless Jinks: Geeves the Butler throws Jinks out due to his messes. Pixie and Dixie summon mice to overrun the house making Jinks wanted back into the house. HW – A Star is Bored: Hokey and Ding-A-Ling come to Hollywood, Los Angeles to become stars. After bypassing security, the only part they play is sweeping the studio.
61	9	"Two for Tee Vee / Home Flea / West of the Pesos"	October 13, 1961
HH – Two for Tee Vee: Huckleberry Hound is called to repair a TV set for a lady, but the family bulldog has other ideas. PDJ – Home Flea: A homeward bound flea with great strength takes refuge on Jinks and prevents him from bullying Pixie and Dixie. HW – West of the Pesos: Hokey and Ding-A-Ling enter Dry Gap Gulch Flat. With some trickery, they arrest Orful Meany, but Hokey is then stuck as a sheriff.
62	10	"Bird House Blues / Dinky Jinks / Phony-O and Juliet"	October 20, 1961
HH – -rr- A repeat of "Bird House Blues."; PDJ – -rr- A repeat of "Dinky Jinks." HW' – Phony-O and Juliet: After another failed attempt at wooing Juliet, Romeo sends for Hokey to reclaim his love. He succeeds, but ends up empty-handed.
63	11	"Hokum Smokum / Hypnotize Surprise / Hokey's Missing Millions"	October 27, 1961
HH – -rr- A repeat of "Hokum Smokum."; PDJ – -rr- A repeat of "Hypnotize Surprise." HW – Hokey's Missing Millions: Billionaire J.B. Goldstone gives Hokey and Ding-A-Ling a large sum of money. Unfortunately, Hokey misses his opportunity and tries to get the money the hard way, all for nothing.
64	12	"Postman Panic / Nice Mice / Loot to Boot"	November 3, 1961
HH – -rr- A repeat of "Postman Panic."; PDJ – -rr- A repeat of "Nice Mice." HW – Loot to Boot: Hokey and Ding-A-Ling apply for a watchdog job at Mula Manor. When a burglar robs the place, the wolves get the blame until Hokey clears the matter up.
65	13	"Ski Champ Chump / King-Size Surprise / Guesting Games"	November 10, 1961
HH – -rr- A repeat of "Ski Champ Chump."; PDJ – -rr- A repeat of "King-Size Surprise." HW – Guesting Games: Hokey and Ding-A-Ling try to barge into a hotel, but the hotel detective won't allow them around. Later, the police force them to leave.
66	14	"Lion Tamer Huck / Cat-Nap Cat / Sick Sense"	November 17, 1961
HH – -rr- A repeat of "Lion Tamer Huck."; PDJ – -rr- A repeat of "Cat-Nap Cat." HW – Sick Sense: The Animal Hospital has had enough of Hokey's freeloading under a false pretense of sickness. Hokey manages to trick them again, but this time an operation is in store for him.
67	15	"Little Red Riding Huck / Mouse-Nappers / Aladdin's Lamb Chops"	November 24, 1961
HH – -rr- A repeat of "Little Red Riding Huck."; PDJ – -rr- A repeat of "Mouse-Nappers." HW – Aladdin's Lamb Chops: Hokey and Ding-A-Ling disguise themselves as genies to fool Farmer Jones into giving them food. Jones soon discovers their game and also learns that the lamp really has a genie.
68	16	"The Tough Little Termite / Boxing Buddy / Bean Pod'ners"	December 1, 1961
HH – -rr- A repeat of "The Tough Little Termite."; PDJ – -rr- A repeat of "Boxing Buddy." HW – Bean Pod'ners: Hokey accidentally grows a giant beanstalk. Up the beanstalk, they enter a castle inhabited by a nice giant and his dog. Of course the wolves run and chop down the beanstalk.

== See also ==
- List of works produced by Hanna-Barbera Productions
- List of Hanna-Barbera characters
- The Good, the Bad, and Huckleberry Hound (1988)
- The Yogi Bear Show (1961)
