= Doug Young (actor) =

American voice actor (1919-2018)

- Born: Douglas Hiram Young; December 21, 1919; Los Angeles, California, U.S.
- Died: January 7, 2018 (aged 98); Seattle, Washington, U.S.
- Occupation: Voice actor
- Years active: 1941–2018
- Spouse: Eileene Mary McKay (1969 – 2007, her death)
- Children: 2

Douglas Hiram Young (December 21, 1919 – January 7, 2018) was an American voice actor who worked on radio programs and in animated cartoons.

== Biography ==
Young was born in Los Angeles, California, on December 21, 1919.

Early in his career, Young appeared in classic radio shows including The Cisco Kid, The New Adventures of Sherlock Holmes, Red Ryder and The Whistler. He was also the announcer on the syndicated radio comedy The Anderson Family, which starred fellow cartoon voice artist Walter Tetley, and aired from 1946 to 1948. Young later went to work for Hanna-Barbera; a master of accent and dialect, he often based his voices on those of famous performers, such as Jimmy Durante and Buddy Hackett.

He used a Jimmy Durante imitation for Doggie Daddy's voice, but the role was later taken over by John Stephenson. Young was also well known as the "Grand Poobah" of The Loyal Order of Water Buffaloes in The Flintstones series. As of March 2003, Young had been doing freelance voice work in Seattle, Washington.

In 1969, Young married Eileene Mary McKay. They remained married until she died in 2007. They had two daughters.

Young died in Seattle, Washington, on January 7, 2018, 17 days after his 98th birthday.

== Television ==
- Loopy De Loop - Additional voices (1959-1965)
- The Quick Draw McGraw Show - Doggie Daddy / additional voices (1959-1961)
- The Huckleberry Hound Show - Ding-A-Ling Wolf (1960-1961)
- The Yogi Bear Show - Bigelow / Doggie Daddy / additional voices (1961-1962)
- The Flintstones - 31 episodes - Grand Poobah / additional voices (1962-1966)
- The Magilla Gorilla Show - J. Whimple Dimple / additional voices (1964)
- Jonny Quest - Additional voices (1964-1965)
- The Peter Potamus Show - Yippee / Additional voices (1964-1965)
- Winsome Witch - Additional voices (1965)
- A Laurel and Hardy Cartoon series - Various Characters (1966)
- Animal Follies - Video - Yippee / Doggie Daddy (1988)
