= The Huckleberry Hound Show =

American animated television series

- Genre: Comedy
- Created by: William Hanna; Joseph Barbera
- Written by: Joseph Barbera; Charles Shows; Dan Gordon; Michael Maltese; Warren Foster; Tony Benedict
- Directed by: William Hanna; Joseph Barbera
- Voices of: Daws Butler; Don Messick; Doug Young
- Narrated by: Daws Butler; Don Messick
- Composer: Hoyt Curtin
- Country of origin: United States
- Original language: English
- No. of seasons: 4
- No. of episodes: 68 (list of episodes)

Production
- Producers: William Hanna; Joseph Barbera
- Running time: 22 minutes (7 minutes per segment)
- Production company: Hanna-Barbera Productions

Original release
- Network: First-run syndication
- Release: September 29, 1958 – December 1, 1961

Related
- The Ruff and Reddy Show (1957); The Quick Draw McGraw Show (1959); The Yogi Bear Show; Pixie and Dixie and Mr. Jinks; Hokey Wolf

The Huckleberry Hound Show is an American animated comedy television series produced by Hanna-Barbera Productions, and the second series produced by the studio following The Ruff and Reddy Show. The show first aired in syndication on September 29, 1958, and was sponsored by Kellogg's. Three segments were included in the program: one featuring the title character, Huckleberry Hound, another with Pixie and Dixie and Mr. Jinks, which starred two mice who in each short found a new way to outwit the cat Mr. Jinks, and a third starring Yogi Bear and his friend Boo-Boo. The series last aired on December 1, 1961.

The Yogi Bear segment of the show became extremely popular, and as a result, it spawned its own series in 1961. A segment featuring Hokey Wolf and Ding-A-Ling was added, replacing Yogi during the 1960–61 season. The show contributed to making Hanna-Barbera a household name, and is often credited with legitimizing the concept of animation produced specifically for television. In 1960, it became the first animated program to be honored with an Emmy Award.

== Background/production ==
=== Conception and development ===
Joseph Barbera went to Chicago to pitch the program to Kellogg's executives through their ad agency, Leo Burnett. "I had never sold a show before because I didn't have to. If we got an idea, we just made it, for over twenty years. All of a sudden, I'm a salesman, and I'm in a room with forty-five people staring at me, and I'm pushing Huckleberry Hound and Yogi Bear and 'the Meeces', and they bought it."

Barbera once recalled about Daws Butler's voice acting versatility:

I can remember distinctly when I first met [Daws], I said, 'I kind of like this voice, but I think I'm gonna make it kind of a Southern voice because Southern voices are warm and friendly.' Daws said, 'Well, now I can do a Southern voice which is like North Carolina, or I can do a Southern voice that would be like Florida, that would be a cracker kind of voice, or if you want to get a little harder, we could get into Texas,' and by gosh, he had about twelve different Southerners.

=== Format ===
The series features three seven-minute cartoons, animated specifically for television. The first always stars Huckleberry, and the next two feature other characters. Each of three cartoons are in between the wraparound segments, which originally set in the circus tent where Huck acts like a showman in the late 1950s.

=== Distribution ===
The show was originally intended to be part of a line-up of kid programs sponsored by Kellogg and broadcast on ABC-TV, joining Woody Woodpecker, Superman and Wild Bill Hickok in an early evening, weekday line-up. However, Kellogg's agency, Leo Burnett, decided instead to syndicate the show and buy air time on individual stations. The show was originally distributed by Screen Gems (the television division at the time of Columbia Pictures) which held a part-ownership of Hanna-Barbera at the time, over 150 stations. In April 1967, Screen Gems announced the show had been released from advertiser control, and would be made available to stations on a syndicated basis with available bridges to create 92 half-hour shows.

The distribution was later passed to Worldvision Enterprises, after it became a sister company to Hanna-Barbera. It was later distributed by Turner Program Services, after Turner's purchase of Hanna-Barbera; the current distributor Warner Bros. Television picked up ownership of the show following the 1996 acquisition of Turner by parent company, Time Warner.

=== Original syndication ===
The show was not broadcast on the same day of the week, or the same time, in every city; airing depended on the deal for time that the Leo Burnett Agency brokered with individual stations. However, the first time the Huck series appeared on television was on Monday, September 29, 1958; it was first seen at 6 p.m. on WOOD-TV in Grand Rapids, Michigan, which also served Battle Creek, home of Kellogg cereals. A few other stations airing it that day were WLWI in Indianapolis (at 6:30 p.m.) and WTAE in Pittsburgh (at 7:30 p.m.). The show debuted on other days that same week in other cities; Huck originally aired in Los Angeles on Tuesdays on KNXT, Chicago on Wednesdays on WGN-TV, and New York City on Thursdays on WPIX. The show first aired in Canada on Thursday, October 2, 1958, at 7 p.m. on CKLW-TV in Windsor, Ontario. The show first aired in Australia on Monday, February 16, 1959, on the National Television Network (now the Nine Network), and the show first aired in the United Kingdom on Friday, July 3, 1959, on ITV.

== Plot and characters ==
Each of the three segments features one or two main characters acting as a duo and numerous one-off or supporting characters.

=== Huckleberry Hound ===
Huck's voice is Butler's impression of a family friend. He used it in earlier work, such as Reddy in The Ruff and Reddy Show, Smedley the Dog in the Chilly Willy cartoons, and earlier characters in the MGM cartoon library. Butler's son Charles confirmed that the voice was based on the neighbor of his wife, Myrtis; Butler would speak with said neighbor when visiting North Carolina.

=== Pixie & Dixie and Mr. Jinks ===
Pixie (voiced by Don Messick) and Dixie (voiced by Daws Butler) are two mice who every day end up being chased by a cat named Mr. Jinks (voiced by Daws Butler).

=== Yogi Bear ===
Yogi Bear (voiced by Daws Butler impersonating Art Carney's Ed Norton character from The Honeymooners) and his friend Boo Boo Bear (voiced by Don Messick) live in Jellystone Park and occasionally try to steal picnic baskets while evading Ranger Smith (also voiced by Don Messick).

=== Hokey Wolf ===
Hokey Wolf (voiced by Daws Butler impersonating Phil Silvers) is a con-artist wolf who is always trying to cheat his way to the simple life (much like other Hanna-Barbera characters, Top Cat and Yogi Bear). He is accompanied in this by his diminutive, bowler hat-wearing sidekick Ding-A-Ling Wolf (voiced by Doug Young impersonating Buddy Hackett).

== Voice cast ==
- Daws Butler - Huckleberry Hound, Yogi Bear, Dixie, Mr. Jinks, Hokey Wolf, Various
- Don Messick - Boo Boo Bear, Ranger Smith, Pixie, Narrator, Various
- Doug Young - Ding-A-Ling Wolf, Various

Additional Voices

- Bea Benaderet - Grandma (in "Little Red Riding Huck"), Lillie Belle Figley (in "Be My Guest Pest"), Humane Society woman (in "Tricks and Treats"), Various
- Julie Bennett - Little Red Riding Hood (in "Little Red Riding Huck")
- Mel Blanc - Chuck Wagon man (in "Chock Full Chuck Wagon")
- Red Coffey
- June Foray
- GeGe Pearson
- Penny Singleton - Damsel in Distress (in "Sir Huckleberry Hound"), Mama Bear (in "Too Much to Bear")
- Hal Smith
- Ginny Tyler
- Jean Vander Pyl

== Credits ==
- Producers and Directors: Joseph Barbera and William Hanna
- Voices: Daws Butler, Don Messick, Doug Young
- Story Directors: Alex Lovy, Paul Sommer, Arthur Davis, John Freeman, Lew Marshall
- Story: Warren Foster
- Story Sketch: Dan Gordon, Charles Shows
- Titles: Lawrence Goble
- Musical Director/Composer: Theme Music: Hoyt Curtin
- Designer: Frank Tipper
- Production Supervisor: Howard Hanson
- Animators: Kenneth Muse, Lewis Marshall, Carlo Vinci, Dick Lundy, George Nicholas, Don Patterson, Allen Wilzbach, Ed DeMattia, Manny Perez, Brad Case, Arthur Davis, Ken Southworth, Ken O'Brien, Emil Carle, George Goepper, Don Towsley, Ralph Somerville, C.L. Hartman, John Boersema, Bob Carr, Hicks Lokey, Don Williams, Gerard Baldwin, Ed Parks, Dick Bickenbach, Ed Love, Michael Lah
- Layout: Dick Bickenbach, Walter Clinton, Tony Rivera, Ed Benedict, Michael Lah, Paul Sommer, Dan Noonan, Lance Nolley, Jim Carmichael, Jerry Eisenberg, Jack Huber, Sam Weiss
- Background: Montealegre, Robert Gentle, Art Lozzi, Richard H. Thomas, Joseph Montell, Vera Hanson, Sam Clayberger, Neenah Maxwell, Frank Tipper

== Episodes ==
Season	Segments	Episodes	Originally released	
Season	Segments	Episodes	First released	Last released
1	66	26	September 29, 1958	March 23, 1959
2	39	13	September 14, 1959	February 22, 1960
3	39	13	September 11, 1960	December 4, 1960
4	34	16	August 18, 1961	December 1, 1961

== Legacy ==
In the film Breakfast at Tiffany's (1961), Holly Golightly (Audrey Hepburn) briefly dons a mask of Huckleberry. The name for Rock et Belles Oreilles, a Québécois comedy group popular during the 1980s, is a pun on the name of Huckleberry Hound ("Roquet Belles Oreilles" in French). Australian prison slang vernacular includes "huckleberry hound", a term originated in the 1960s, meaning "a punishment cell, solitary confinement." In January 2009, IGN named The Huckleberry Hound Show as the 63rd best in its "Top 100 Animated TV Shows".

In 1960s Hungary, the series – there called Foxi Maxi – gained an instant following, also among adults. The reason for this was that legendary scriptwriter József Romhányi had penned dialog with his trademark puns and humor, and some of the most popular actors of the day had supplied the voices. Romhányi and some of the same actors later worked on the Hungarian version of The Flintstones.

== Media information ==
=== Home media ===
On November 15, 2005, Warner Home Video released The Huckleberry Hound Show – Volume 1 for the Hanna-Barbera Classics Collection, featuring the complete first season of 26 episodes (66 segments) from the series on DVD, all presented remastered and restored. However, the episodes in the Volume 1 DVD set were the edited versions with only the individual segments, instead of the uncut and unedited original broadcast versions with the original opening and closing titles and interstitial segments.

After Volume 1, no further volumes of The Huckleberry Hound Show were released on DVD. According to Warner Archive President George Feltenstein, since many early Hanna-Barbera shows used stock music from Capitol Records, there were rights issues between WB and the estates of the composers over the music cues used in the show that prevented further seasons from being released.

However in 2025, Warner Archive Collection cleared the rights and announced The Huckleberry Hound Show: The Complete Original Series, an 11-disc Blu-ray box set that contains all 68 episodes (178 segments) restored with the original opening/closing credits and bridging material intact, as well as all the extras from the 2005 DVD. The set was released on August 26, 2025.

Homevideo title	Ep #	Release date	Additional information
The Huckleberry Hound Show – Volume 1 (The First Season) (DVD)	26 episodes (66 segments)	November 15, 2005	A bonus collectible animation cel; Featurette on reconstructing the premiere episode; Never-before-seen bumpers and bridge; Segment tributing Daws Butler, voice actor
The Huckleberry Hound Show: The Complete Original Series (Blu-ray)	68 episodes (178 segments)	August 26, 2025	Same as the DVDs. Minus reconstruction of the original pilot episode.

=== Licensing ===
The characters from The Huckleberry Hound Show spawned various product, publishing, and other licensing deals. Colpix Records, the recording company of Columbia Pictures/Screen Gems, released the first Huckleberry Hound album in October 1958, with stuffed animals and games also hawked in record stores.

No later than 1961, the characters began appearing "in person" at events across America. Hanna-Barbera commissioned costumed characters of Huckleberry Hound, Yogi Bear, and Quick Draw McGraw, which appeared at events like the Florida State Fair.

Hanna-Barbera's owner Taft Broadcasting started opening theme parks in 1972, beginning with Kings Island. These parks included areas themed to the company's cartoons, and included walk-around characters of Huckleberry Hound, Yogi Bear, and others. The characters were also featured on rides, including carousels. Licensed Huckleberry products included an Aladdin-brand Thermos.

=== Books adaptations ===
- Huckleberry Hound Christmas, P. Scherr, Golden Press, 25 cents.
- Huckleberry Hound: The Case of the Friendly Monster, Ottenheimer Publishers, 1978, 96 pages.

== See also ==
- List of works produced by Hanna-Barbera Productions
- List of Hanna-Barbera characters
- The Yogi Bear Show
- Pixie and Dixie and Mr. Jinks
- Hokey Wolf
