= Hokey Wolf =

American animated television series

- Title card
- Genre: Comedy
- Created by: William Hanna; Joseph Barbera
- Written by: Joseph Barbera; Warren Foster; Dan Gordon; Michael Maltese; Charles Shows
- Directed by: William Hanna; Joseph Barbera
- Voices of: Daws Butler; Doug Young
- Composer: Hoyt Curtin
- Country of origin: United States
- Original language: English
- No. of seasons: 2
- No. of episodes: 28

Production
- Producers: William Hanna; Joseph Barbera
- Running time: 7 minutes per short
- Production company: Hanna-Barbera Productions

Original release
- Network: Syndication
- Release: September 11, 1960 – December 1, 1961

Related
- Yogi Bear (1958–1960); The Huckleberry Hound Show (1958)

Hokey Wolf is one of the three segments of The Huckleberry Hound Show. Produced by Hanna-Barbera Productions, this show details the adventures of Hokey Wolf, a con-artist wolf who is always trying to cheat his way into the simple life. He is often accompanied alongside by his young, diminutive sidekick Ding-A-Ling Wolf, both of whom are featured as part of The Huckleberry Hound Show in their own segment that replaces Yogi Bear segments during the third and fourth seasons.

== History ==
The initial creation of Hokey Wolf occurred when another follow-up segment was needed, because Yogi Bear's rising popularity in preceding appearances warranted a promotion to his own self-titled show. As a result of the change in schedule, Hokey Wolf had made its debut midway through the third season of The Huckleberry Hound Show and became a regular appearance afterward on this segment. Hokey's theme music for his segment of the show was composed by Hoyt Curtin and used an instrumental version of the refrain from "Hail, Hail, the Gang's All Here".

The segment follows the everyday misadventures of its protagonist, Hokey Wolf, and his small companion Ding-A-Ling Wolf, through their typical con-artist routines of getting what they need in their daily lives. Through each episode, Hokey would usually try to fool different characters with food-stealing schemes and/or finding a place to stay without cost, only for most of these tricks to backfire on him in one way or another.

On occasion, Hokey and Ding-A-Ling would run afoul of a farmer when trying to target either his chickens or his sheep.

== Character information ==
Both of the cartoon's feature characters were designed by animation artist and character designer Ed Benedict.

=== Hokey Wolf ===
Hokey Wolf (voiced by Daws Butler) is the smooth-talking title character throughout each cartoon. His main hobby in life was to outsmart and coax the clueless out of free meals or places to stay, much of which he seemed to do so with ease, despite possible consequences later on. Hokey typically wears his trademark green bow tie with white collar and a violet-colored hat. His personality would later be recycled for fellow Hanna-Barbera characters such as Top Cat, who starred in a prime-time sitcom that ran from 1961 to 1962 that followed a very similar concept. His voice is inspired by Phil Silvers.

=== Ding-A-Ling Wolf ===
Ding-A-Ling Wolf (voiced by Doug Young) is the young sidekick of Hokey Wolf who always accompanies him throughout each misadventure. He is usually eager to follow in his mentor's ambitious con-artist footsteps, but often reconsiders the plans he will come up with in many situations. Ding typically wears a bowler hat (sometimes red, sometimes black), a sleeveless green shirt, and a black vest. His voice is inspired by Buddy Hackett.

=== Farmer ===
A farmer (voiced by Daws Butler) whose name varies per episode runs a farm where he raises his livestock. He would often work to keep them from falling into Hokey and Ding-A-Ling's hands which varying results for all three of them.

== Segments on The Huckleberry Hound Show ==
In total, Hokey and Ding-A-Ling Wolf starred in 28 seven-minute cartoons throughout the third and fourth seasons (1960–1961) of The Huckleberry Hound Show. Their pilot episode was Tricks and Treats. The Hokey Wolf series would come to an end with the episode "Bean Pod’ners", airing on December 1, 1961. Below is a complete listing of all cartoon shorts with the protagonist Hokey Wolf:

=== Season 1 (1960) ===
No. overall	No. in season	Title	Original release date
1	1	"Tricks and Treats"	September 11, 1960
Hokey and Ding-A-Ling set up Farmer Smith to gain free food handouts. Hokey then summons the press to ensure his success.
2	2	"Hokey Dokey"	September 18, 1960
Hokey and Ding-A-Ling go house hunting. Hokey scares the Three Little Pigs out of their house, but the pigs and the Big Bad Wolf teach him a lesson.
3	3	"Lamb-Basted Wolf"	September 25, 1960
After Hokey reads Ding-A-Ling the story of "The Boy who Cried Wolf", Hokey uses the idea to nab some sheep from the farmer, but his plans backfire on him.
4	4	"Which Witch Is Which"	October 2, 1960
Hokey and Ding-A-Ling nibble a witch's gingerbread house but she drives them away. She then summons them back for her stew, but the wolves escape with her broom.
5	5	"Pick a Chick"	October 9, 1960
Hokey and Ding-A-Ling go to raid the farmer's hen house. First they have to trick watchdog Douglas. Little do they know, the farmer wants to be rid of those chickens.
6	6	"Robot Plot"	October 16, 1960
A chicken farmer fed up with Hokey's egg snatching makes a robot to dispose of him. After a brief chase, Hokey reprograms the robot to get the farmer.
7	7	"Castle Hassle"	October 30, 1960
Hokey and Ding-A-Ling explore a castle, empty except for the cacophonic Evil Queen. When the Queen sends the wolves to deliver an apple to Snow White at the house of the Seven Dwarfs, they sabotage her plan.
8	8	"Booty on the Bounty"	November 6, 1960
Hokey and Ding-A-Ling turn themselves over to an assistant warden for the reward bounty followed by a bail. They repeat this scheme many times successfully.
9	9	"Hokey in the Pokey"	November 13, 1960
Two thieves have stolen a valuable painting and hide in Hokey's cave. Ten months later, they try to take the painting from the wolves at gunpoint until the wolves turn them over to the police.
10	10	"Who’s Zoo"	November 20, 1960
Hokey and Ding-A-Ling go to the lion cage at the zoo to try to get the meat from the lion. After several failed attempts, they join up in the wolf cage.
11	11	"Dogged Sheep Dog"	November 27, 1960
Hokey convinces a sheep dog to train Ding-A-Ling as a sheep dog to steal a lamb. But the training is hindering Hokey's attempts.
12	12	"Too Much to Bear"	December 4, 1960
Under the pretext of detective work, Hokey and Ding-A-Ling go to The Three Bears' house to acquire their food and beds. But they are met with the burglar Lightfingers Louie.

=== Season 2 (1961) ===
No. overall	No. in season	Title	Original release date
13	1	"Movies Are Bitter than Ever"	August 18, 1961
Hokey uses a movie set to sneak out some sheep being herded by a sheep dog. The farmer and sheep dog wise up to the wolves' trick and chase after them.
14	2	"Poached Yeggs"	August 25, 1961
Hokey and Ding-A-Ling capture a fire-breathing dragon and turn him into a prince to kiss Sleeping Beauty. But things don't turn out right for the dragon and wolves.
15	3	"Rushing Wolf Hound"	September 1, 1961
A farmer buys an exotic watchdog called Wau-Wau who hates wolves. After many failed attempts, Hokey turns the watchdog against the farmer.
16	4	"The Glass Sneaker"	September 8, 1961
Prince Charming hires Hokey and Ding-A-Ling as detectives to track down Cinderella. He overlooks her and tangles with her two stepsisters before giving her the glass sneaker.
17	5	"Indian Giver"	September 15, 1961
The young "Injun" Hiawatha hunts down Hokey and eventually brings him back to his tribe. Hokey then attracts the attention of more young "Injuns."
18	6	"Chock Full Chuck Wagon"	September 22, 1961
Hokey attempts to get close to a chuck wagon to swipe some of the sheriff's food. Just when the wolves have driven the sheriff away, an actual cattle stampede drives them away.
19	7	"Bring 'Em Back a Live One"	September 29, 1961
After falling for one of Hokey's tricks, Farmer Smith hires a professional hunter and his hunting dog to capture Hokey alive. Sure enough, there's no escape from the hunter.
20	8	"A Star Is Bored"	October 10, 1961
Hokey and Ding-A-Ling come to Hollywood to become stars. After bypassing security, the only part they play is sweeping the studio.
21	9	"West of the Pesos"	October 13, 1961
Hokey and Ding-A-Ling enter Dry Gap Gulch Flat. With some trickery, they arrest Orful Meany, but Hokey is then stuck as a sheriff.
22	10	"Phony-O and Juliet"	October 20, 1961
After another failed attempt at wooing Juliet, Romeo sends for Hokey to reclaim his love. He succeeds, but ends up empty-handed.
23	11	"Hokey's Missing Millions"	October 27, 1961
Billionaire J.B. Goldstone gives Hokey and Ding-A-Ling a large sum of money. Unfortunately, Hokey misses his opportunity and tries to get the money the hard way, all for nothing.
24	12	"Loot to Boot"	November 3, 1961
Hokey and Ding-A-Ling apply for a watchdog job at Mula Manor. When a burglar robs the place, the wolves get the blame until Hokey clears the matter up.
25	13	"Guesting Games"	November 11, 1961
Hokey and Ding-A-Ling try to barge into a hotel, but the hotel detective won't allow them around. Later, the police force them to leave.
26	14	"Sick Sense"	November 17, 1961
The Animal Hospital has had enough of Hokey's freeloading under a false pretense of sickness. Hokey manages to trick them again, but this time an operation is in store for him.
27	15	"Aladdin's Lamb Chops"	November 24, 1961
Hokey and Ding-A-Ling disguise themselves as genies to fool Farmer Jones into giving them food. Jones soon discovers their game and also learns that the lamp really has a genie.
28	16	"Bean Pod'ners"	December 1, 1961
Hokey accidentally grows a giant beanstalk. Up the beanstalk, they enter a castle inhabited by a nice giant and his dog. Of course, the wolves run and chop down the beanstalk. Note: The often-listed erroneous cartoon title Boobs in the Woods is actually an alternate or working title for Bean Pod'ners.

== Home media ==
The episodes Tricks and Treats and Castle Hassle are on the DVD Hanna-Barbera 25 Cartoon Collection, part of The Best of Warner Bros. collection series.

On August 26, 2025, Warner Archive Collection released The Huckleberry Hound Show: The Complete Original Series, an 11-disc Blu-ray box set that contains all 68 episodes (including the 28 Hokey Wolf segments) restored with the original opening/closing credits and bridging material intact, as well as all the extras from the 2005 DVD.

== Further appearances ==
=== Hanna-Barbera series ===
While the initial series ended in December 1961, Hokey Wolf went on to appear in four other animated Hanna-Barbera series alongside other classic characters. These were as follows:

- Yogi's Gang (1973) – Hokey was a member of the crew.
- Laff-A-Lympics (1977–1978) – Hokey Wolf played as a team member of The Yogi Yahooeys.
- Yogi's Treasure Hunt (1985–1988) – Hokey was a regular guest star in several episodes.
- Yo Yogi! (1991) – Hokey Wolf (voiced by Matt Hurwitz) co-starred as the Mayor of Jellystone Town. His younger companion Ding-A-Ling also made a brief non-speaking cameo as Hokey's photographer in the episode "Super Duper Snag", but he has a speaking role in the episode "Polly Want a Safe Cracker" voiced by Patric Zimmerman.

=== Hanna-Barbera films ===
- In the last episode of The Yogi Bear Show (1962), Hokey Wolf, along with his sidekick Ding-A-Ling, were among the guests who showed up to wish their friend Yogi Bear a happy birthday.
- In the 1972 television movie Yogi's Ark Lark, both Hokey Wolf and Ding-A-Ling appeared together as part of the gang. The film was part of The ABC Saturday Superstar Movie and also the pilot for Yogi's Gang.
- In the 1982 television special Yogi Bear's All Star Comedy Christmas Caper, Hokey Wolf co-starred as a member of the group that visited Yogi in Jellystone Park. Hokey Wolf also mentioned to Ranger Smith that he is friends with the United States Secretary of the Interior.
- In the 1988 feature-length television film The Good, the Bad, and Huckleberry Hound, Hokey Wolf co-starred in and played the mayor of a western town named Two-Bit.

=== Other appearances ===
- Both Hokey Wolf and Ding-A-Ling appeared on Harvey Birdman, Attorney at Law.
  - Hokey made non-speaking cameo appearances in the episodes "Peanut Puberty", "Evolutionary War", "Juror in Court", and "The Death of Harvey".
  - Ding-A-Ling (voiced by Neil Ross) was a plaintiff in "SPF" when his name was being used without his consent as a URL for a pornographic website. He also made cameo appearances in "Identity Theft", "Juror in Court", and "The Death of Harvey".
- In Wacky Races episode "The Wacky Always Races Twice", Ding-A-Ling plays a thug of Professor Bella.
- Hokey Wolf and Ding-A-Ling both appear in the HBO Max original series Jellystone!. Ding-A-Ling is portrayed as a child in the series.

== In other languages ==
- Brazilian Portuguese: Joca & Dingue-Lingue
- Finnish: Hokey Susi
- Polish: Hokej Wilk
- Hebrew: הוקי וולף
- Russian: Хоки Волк
- Danish: Hokey Ulv
- Greek: Χόκεϊ Γουλφ
- French: Garoup le Loup
- Czech: Hokej Vlk
- Italian: Ugo Lupo
- Bulgarian: Хоки Вълк
- Dutch: Opgesmukt Wolf
- Swedish: Hokey Varg
- Japanese: Hokey のオオカミ (Hokey Ookami)
- Spanish: El Lobo Hokey
- Norwegian: Hokey Ulv
- Hungarian: Lompos Lajos
- Serbian: Vuk Vučko

== See also ==
- The Huckleberry Hound Show
  - List of The Huckleberry Hound Show episodes
- List of works produced by Hanna-Barbera
- List of Hanna-Barbera characters
