= List of animated television series of 1998 =

This is a list of animated television series first aired in 1998.

Animated television series first aired in 1998
Title	Seasons	Episodes	Country	Year	Original channel	Technique
The Adventures of Captain Pugwash	1	26	United Kingdom	1998–2001	ITV	Traditional
Anatole	1	26	Canada, France, United Kingdom	1998–99	CBS	Traditional
Angry Kid	4	70	United Kingdom	1998–2019	Channel 4 (1998–2002); BBC Three (2003–06); YouTube (2007–19)	Stop-Motion; Live action
Animal Stories	4	52	United Kingdom	1998–2001	ITV	Traditional
Archibald the Koala	3	52	United Kingdom	1998–2000	ITV; France 3 and Canal J	Traditional
Bad Dog	2	40	Canada, United States	1998–2000	Fox Kids; Fox Family Channel; Teletoon	Traditional
Bakkar		11	Egypt	1998–2016	Egyptian Television Channel One	Traditional
Bio Cop Wingo	1	14	South Korea	1998	MBC	Traditional
Birdz	1	13	Canada	1998–99	CBS	Traditional
Bob and Margaret	4	52	Canada, United Kingdom (seasons 1–2)	1998–2001	Comedy Central; Global; Channel 4 (seasons 1–2)	Traditional
Bob Morane	1	26	Canada, France	1998	Canal+ Super Écran	Traditional
Bobtales	1	13	Australia	1998	SBS	Traditional
CatDog	4	68	United States	1998–2005	Nickelodeon	Traditional
Celebrity Deathmatch	6	93	Canada (seasons 5–6), United States (entire run)	1998–2007	MTV (1998–2002); MTV2 (2006–07); The Comedy Network (2006–07)	Stop-Motion
Chucklewood Critters	2	26	United States	1998–99	ABC	Traditional
The Country Mouse and the City Mouse Adventures	2	52	Canada, France	1998–99	Canal J France 3 TVOntario (season 1); YTV; Ici Radio-Canada Télé	Traditional
Les Dieux de l'Olympe	1	26	France	1998	Canal+	Traditional
The Digswell Dog Show	1	13	Australia	1998	Network Ten	Traditional
Dumb Bunnies	1	26	Australia, Canada	1998–99	CBS	Traditional
Esquimales en el Caribe	1		Spain	1998	La Primera	CGI
F.A.E.L.L.	2	60	France	1998	Canal+	CGI
Flying Rhino Junior High	2	26	Canada, France, United Kingdom, United States	1998–2000	CBS; TF1/Teletoon; ITV; Scottish Television	Traditional
Godzilla: The Series	2	40	Japan, United States	1998–2001	Fox Kids	Traditional
Grand-Mère est une Sorcière	1	26	France	1998	Canal+	Traditional
Hercules: The Animated Series	2	65	United States	1998–99	Syndication; ABC	Traditional
Histeria!	2	52	United States	1998–2000	Kids' WB	Traditional
Invasion America	1	13	United States	1998	The WB	Traditional
Jay Jay the Jet Plane	4	50	United States	1998–2005	TLC (seasons 1–2); PBS (season 3)	CGI; Live action
Jean-Luc & Dondoozat	1	35	France	1998	Canal+	Traditional
Jellabies	10	97	Australia, United Kingdom	1998–2001	ABC for Kids; GMTV	CGI
Joe Cartoon			United States	1998–present	Mondo Mini Shows/Mondo Media	Flash
Keluang Man	7	144	Malaysia	1998–2005	TV1	Traditional
Ketchup: Cats Who Cook	1	65	Australia, Japan	1998–99	NHK Educational TV; Nine Network	Traditional
Lascars	2	60	France	1998–2007	Canal+	Traditional
Lights... Camera... Action!	1	26	Spain	1998	Antena 3	Traditional
The Lionhearts	1	13	United States	1998	Syndication	Traditional
The Little King	1	65	Germany	1998–2013	Der Kinderkanal	Traditional
Little Monsters	1	52	United Kingdom	1998	CBBC	Traditional
Mad Jack the Pirate	1	13	United States	1998–99	Fox Kids	Traditional
Michel Strogoff	1	26	France	1998	France 3	Traditional
Monster Farm	1	13	United States	1998–99	Fox Family Channel; Fox Kids	Traditional
Mumble Bumble	1	65	Canada, Denmark	1998–2000	CBC Television	Traditional
Mythic Warriors	2	26	Canada, China, France	1998–2000	CBS	Traditional
Noddy	2	66	Canada	1998–99	TVOntario/CBC Television	Stop-motion; Live action
Oh Yeah! Cartoons	3	34	United States	1998–2002	Nickelodeon	Traditional
Papyrus	2	52	Belgium, Canada, France	1998–2000	TF1	Traditional
PB Bear and Friends	1	30	United Kingdom	1998	Channel 5	Stop-Motion
PB&J Otter	3	65	United States	1998–2000	Playhouse Disney	Traditional
Petals	1	30	Australia	1998–99	ABC	Traditional
Pinky, Elmyra & the Brain	1	13	United States	1998–99	Kids' WB	Traditional
Pocket Dragon Adventures	1	52	Spain, United States	1998–99	TVE; Syndication	Traditional
The Powerpuff Girls (1998)	6	78	United States	1998–2005	Cartoon Network	Traditional
Raven the Little Rascal		26	Germany	1998–2005	Der Kinderkanal	Traditional
Renaade	2	72	Germany	1998–99	Der Kinderkanal	Traditional
Rex the Runt	2	26	Denmark, France, United Kingdom	1998–2005	BBC Two (1998–2001); BBC Four (2005); Canal+ (series 1)	Stop-Motion, Live-Action
RoboCop: Alpha Commando	1	40	Canada, United States	1998–99	Syndication	Traditional
Rocky and the Dodos	2	26	United Kingdom	1998–99	ITV	Stop-Motion
Rolie Polie Olie	6	78	Canada, France	1998–2004	CBC Television; La Cinquième/France 5 Playhouse Disney	CGI
Rotten Ralph	1	55	Canada, United Kingdom	1998–2001	CBBC; Nickelodeon	Stop-Motion
Salty's Lighthouse	1	40	Canada, United States	1998	Syndication; TLC	Traditional
Sandokan: The Tiger of Malaysia	1	26	France, Italy	1998–99	Rai Uno	Traditional
The Secret Files of the Spy Dogs	2	22	United States	1998–99	Fox Kids	Traditional
Shadow Raiders	2	26	Canada	1998–99	YTV	CGI
Silver Surfer	1	13	Canada, United States	1998	Fox Kids	Traditional
Skippy: Adventures in Bushtown	1	26	Australia, France, Germany	1998–99	Nine Network	Traditional
Le Soleil est une Girafe Jaune	1	10	France	1998	La Cinquième	Traditional
SOS Croco!	1	65	France	1998–2000	TF1	Traditional
Speed King Bungae	1	26	South Korea	1998	SBS	Traditional
Starhill Ponies	2	26	United Kingdom	1998–2002	CBBC; S4C	Stop-Motion
Stressed Eric	2	13	Hungary (series 2), United Kingdom, United States (series 1)	1998–2000	BBC Two; NBC (series 1 only)	Traditional
The Three Friends and Jerry	3	39	Germany, Sweden, United Kingdom	1998–1999	SVT; Fox Kids; Der Kinderkanal; Nickelodeon	Traditional
Timbuctoo	2	26	United Kingdom	1998–2000	CITV	Traditional
Tom-Tom et Nana	1	52	France	1998–99	France 3 Canal J	Traditional
Toonsylvania	2	21	United States	1998–99	Fox Kids	Traditional
Triple Z	1	52	France	1998–2000	Canal J	Traditional
Trouble with Sophie	1	26	France	1998–99	France 3	Traditional
The Ugly Duckling	2	104	Spain	1998	La Primera	Traditional
Voltron: The Third Dimension	2	26	United States	1998–2000	Syndication	CGI
The Wacky Adventures of Ronald McDonald	1	6	United States	1998–2003	Direct-to-video	Traditional
Wiggly Park	2	26	United Kingdom	1998–99	BBC Two	Traditional
The Wild Thornberrys	5	91	United States	1998–2004	Nickelodeon	Traditional

Anime television series first aired in 1998

Title	Seasons	Episodes	Country	Year	Original channel	Technique
The Adventures of Mini-Goddess	1	48	Japan	1998–99		Traditional
Alice SOS	1	14	Japan	1998–99	NHK	Traditional
All Purpose Cultural Cat Girl Nuku Nuku	1	12	Japan	1998		Traditional
Android Announcer Maico 2010	1	24	Japan	1998		Traditional
Anime Syuukan DX! Mi-Pha-Pu	1	47	Japan	1998–99		Traditional
AWOL	1	12	Japan	1998		Traditional
Bakusō Kyōdai Let's & Go!! MAX	1	51	Japan	1998		Traditional
Beast Wars II: Super Life-Form Transformers	1	43	Japan	1998–99		Traditional
Bomberman B-Daman Bakugaiden	1	48	Japan	1998–99		Traditional
Brain Powerd	1	26	Japan	1998		Traditional
Bubblegum Crisis Tokyo 2040	1	26	Japan	1998–99		Traditional
Cardcaptor Sakura	3	70	Japan	1998–2000		Traditional
Cowboy Bebop	1	26	Japan	1998–99		Traditional
Cyber Team in Akihabara	1	26	Japan	1998		Traditional
Devil Lady	1	26	Japan	1998–99		Traditional
Dokkiri Doctor	1	27	Japan	1998–99		Traditional
DT Eightron	1	26	Japan	1998		Traditional
Eat-Man '98	1	12	Japan	1998		Traditional
El-Hazard: The Alternative World	1	13	Japan	1998		Traditional
Fancy Lala	1	26	Japan	1998		Traditional
Flint the Time Detective	1	39	Japan	1998–99	TV Tokyo	Traditional
Fushigi Mahou Fan Fan Pharmacy	1	48	Japan	1998–99		Traditional
Gasaraki	1	25	Japan	1998–99		Traditional
Generator Gawl	1	12	Japan	1998		Traditional
Ginga Hyōryū Vifam 13	1	26	Japan	1998		Traditional
Grander Musashi RV	1	39	Japan	1998		Traditional
Hatsumei Boy Kanipan	1	31	Japan	1998–99		Traditional
Heli-Tako Pū-chan	1	42	Japan	1998–99		Traditional
Himitsu no Akko-chan (1998)	1	44	Japan	1998–99		Traditional
If I See You in My Dreams	1	16	Japan	1998		Traditional
Initial D First Stage	1	26	Japan	1998		Traditional
Kare Kano	1	26	Japan	1998–99		Traditional
Kocchi Muite! Miiko	1	42	Japan	1998–99		Traditional
Kurogane Communication	1	24	Japan	1998–99		Traditional
Legend of Basara	1	13	Japan	1998		Traditional
Lost Universe	1	26	Japan	1998		Traditional
Mamotte Shugogetten	1	22	Japan	1998–99		Traditional
Master Keaton	1	24	Japan	1998–99		Traditional
Monkey Magic	1	13	Japan	1998		Traditional
Nazca	1	12	Japan	1998		Traditional
Neo Ranga	2	48	Japan	1998–99		Traditional
Nightwalker: The Midnight Detective	1	12	Japan	1998		Traditional
Ojarumaru	26	1998+	Japan	1998–present		Traditional
Outlaw Star	1	26	Japan	1998		Traditional
Popolocrois Monogatari	1	25	Japan	1998–99		Traditional
Princess Nine	1	26	Japan	1998		Traditional
Record of Lodoss War: Chronicles of the Heroic Knight	1	27	Japan	1998		Traditional
Saber Marionette J to X	1	26	Japan	1998–99		Traditional
Sentimental Journey	1	12	Japan	1998		Traditional
Serial Experiments Lain	1	13	Japan	1998		Traditional
Sexy Commando Gaiden: Sugoi yo!! Masaru-san	1	48	Japan	1998		Traditional
Shadow Skill: Eigi	1	26	Japan	1998		Traditional
Silent Möbius	1	26	Japan	1998		Traditional
Sorcerous Stabber Orphen	1	24	Japan	1998–99		Traditional
St. Luminous Mission High School	1	13	Japan	1998		Traditional
Steam Detectives	1	26	Japan	1998–99		Traditional
Super Doll Licca-chan	1	52	Japan	1998–99		Traditional
Super Milk Chan	1	14	Japan	1998		Traditional
Super Radical Gag Family	1	33	Japan	1998		Traditional
Super Yo-Yo	1	22	Japan	1998–99		Traditional
Takoyaki Mantoman	1	77	Japan	1998–99		Traditional
Trigun	1	26	Japan	1998		Traditional
Weiß Kreuz	1	25	Japan	1998		Traditional
YAT Anshin! Uchū Ryokō 2	1	25	Japan	1998		Traditional
Yoiko	1	20	Japan	1998–99		Traditional
Yu-Gi-Oh!	1	27	Japan	1998	ANN	Traditional

== See also ==
- List of animated feature films of 1998
- List of Japanese animation television series of 1998
