= List of animated feature films of 1998 =

This is a list of animated feature films first released in 1998.

== List ==
| Title | Country | Director | Production company | Animation technique | Format | Notes | Release date | Duration |
|---|---|---|---|---|---|---|---|---|
| 10+2: The Magic Trail; 10+2: La nit màgica | Spain | Miquel Pujol (also a storyboard director) | Accio; Infinit Animacions S.L. Televisió de Catalunya (TV3); Televisión Española (TVE); Victory Media Group | Traditional | Television special | A sequel to this special followed three years later, 10+2: The Great Secret (2001). | December 27, 1998 | 43 minutes |
| Ahmed, Prince of Alhambra; Ahmed, el principe de la Alhambra | Spain | Juan Berasategi | Canal Sur Televisión (participation); Euskal Irrati Telebista (EiTB) (participation); Euskal Média S.A. Lotura Films; Ministerio de Cultura (funding) | Traditional | Theatrical | Winner of the Best Music Award at the 2nd Festival of European Animated Feature Films and TV Specials. | July 17, 1998 | 70 minutes |
| An All Dogs Christmas Carol | United States | Paul Sabella; Gary Selvaggio | Metro-Goldwyn-Mayer Animation | Traditional | Direct-to-video | Third and final installment in the All Dogs Go to Heaven series; also serves as the series finale to the animated television series based on the films. | November 17, 1998 | 73 minutes |
| An American Tail: The Treasure of Manhattan Island | United States | Larry Latham | Universal Cartoon Studios | Traditional | Direct-to-video | Third installment in the An American Tail film series. | November 16, 1998 | 79 minutes |
| Go! Anpanman: The Palm of the Hand to the Sun ja:それいけ!アンパンマン てのひらを太陽に | Japan | Akinori Nagaoka | Anpanman Production Committee, TMS Entertainment | Traditional | | | July 25, 1998 | 55 minutes |
| Ancient Alien | United States | Steven Churchill | Odyssey Productions | Computer | Direct-to-video; Art film Compilation film | Second installment of The Mind's Eye Presents sister series, a follow-up of the original Mind's Eye series. | July 10, 1998 | 45 minutes |
| The Animated Adventures of Tom Sawyer | United States | William R. Kowalchuk Jr. | Artisan Entertainment; BLT Productions; Colorland Animation Productions; Tundra Productions | Traditional | Direct-to-video | | July 21, 1998 | 73 minutes |
| Antz | United States | Eric Darnell; Tim Johnson | DreamWorks Pictures; DreamWorks Animation; Pacific Data Images | Computer | Theatrical | First film produced by DreamWorks Animation. | October 2, 1998 | 83 minutes |
| Batman & Mr. Freeze: SubZero | United States | Boyd Kirkland | Warner Bros. Animation | Traditional | Direct-to-video | | March 17, 1998 | 70 minutes |
| Beast Wars II: Lio Convoy's Close Call! ビーストウォーズII ライオコンボイ危機一髪! (Bīsuto Wōzu Sekando: Raio Konboi Kiki Ippatsu!) | Japan | Akira Nishimori | Ashi Productions; Nihon Ad Systems; Toei Company (distributor) | Traditional | Theatrical | | December 19, 1998 | 47 minutes |
| Belle's Magical World | United States | Cullen Blaine; Daniel de la Vega; Barbara Dourmashkin; Dale Kase; Bob Kline; Burt Medall; Mitch Rochon | Walt Disney Television Animation; Disney Video Premiere | Traditional | Direct-to-video | Third installment in the Beauty and the Beast series; compiled from three completed episodes from the proposed animated television series based on the 1991 film. | February 17, 1998 | 70 minutes |
| The Brave Little Toaster Goes to Mars | United States; United Kingdom | Robert C. Ramirez | Hyperion Animation; The Kushner-Locke Company | Traditional | Direct-to-video | Third and final installment in The Brave Little Toaster film series; based on the 1988 novel of the same name by original author Thomas M. Disch. | May 18, 1998 | 73 minutes |
| A Bug's Life | United States | John Lasseter | Walt Disney Pictures (distributor); Pixar Animation Studios | Computer | Theatrical | | November 25, 1998 | 95 minutes |
| Buster & Chauncey's Silent Night | United States | Buzz Potamkin | Columbia TriStar Home Video (distributor); Project X Productions; Tundra Productions | Traditional | Direct-to-video | | October 13, 1998 | 49 minutes |
| Camelot | United States | Greg Garcia | Golden Films; Sony Wonder (distributor) | Traditional | Direct-to-video | | February 17, 1998 | 48 minutes |
| Camelot | Australia | | Burbank Animation Studios | Traditional | Direct-to-video | | March 24, 1998 | 50 minutes |
| Camelot: The Legend | United States | William R. Kowalchuk Jr. | Phoenix Animation Studios; Tundra Productions | Traditional | Direct-to-video | | May 2, 1998 | 60 minutes |
| The Christmas Story Keepers | United States | Jimmy T. Murakami | Shepherd Film Productions; Zondervan | Traditional | Direct-to-video; Compilation film | Compilation film of episodes 1, 6, 7 and 13 of the animation television series The Story Keepers, that ran for a total of thirteen half-hour episodes. | July 1, 1998 | 70 minutes |
| Circleen: City Mouse; Cirkeline - Storbyens Mus | Denmark | Jannik Hastrup | Dansk Tegnefilm | Traditional | Theatrical | | December 4, 1998 | 62 minutes |
| Coco & Drila Adventures: The Magic Sack of Santa Claus | Spain | Julián Tarragó | Avo Film Edizioni | Traditional | Direct-to-video | | | 50 minutes |
| Computer Animation Celebration | United States | | Odyssey Productions | Computer | Direct-to-video; Art film Compilation film | Sixth installment of the Computer Animation sub-series, a spin-off from the Mind's Eye series. | January 1, 1998 | 50 minutes |
| Crayon Shin-chan: Blitzkrieg! Pig's Hoof's Secret Mission クレヨンしんちゃん 電撃! ブタのヒヅメ大作戦 (Crayon Shin-chan: Dengeki! Buta no Hizume Daisakusen) | Japan | Keiichi Hara | Toho; Shin-Ei Animation; Asatsu-DK | Traditional | Theatrical | | April 18, 1998 | 99 minutes |
| Detective Conan: The Fourteenth Target 名探偵コナン 14番目の標的（ターゲット） (Meitantei Conan: Jūyon Banme no Target) | Japan | Kenji Kodama | Toho Company; TMS Entertainment | Traditional | Theatrical | | April 18, 1998 | 99 minutes |
| Dibu 2: Nasty's Revenge; Dibu 2, la venganza de Nasty | Spain | Carlos Galettini; Emiliano Torres | Buena Vista International (distributor); Patagonik Film Group; Televisión Federal (Telefe) | Traditional/Live action | Theatrical; Live-action animated film | | July 2, 1998 | 86 minutes |
| Doraemon: Nobita's Great Adventure in the South Seas 映画ドラえもん のび太の南海大冒険 (Eiga Doraemon: Nobita no Nankai Daibōken) | Japan | Tsutomu Shibayama | Toho Company; Shin-Ei Animation | Traditional | Theatrical | | March 7, 1998 | 91 minutes |
| The Easter Story Keepers | United States | Jimmy T. Murakami | Shepherd Film Productions; Zondervan | Traditional | Direct-to-video; Compilation film | Compilation film of episodes 10—12 of the animation television series The Story Keepers, that ran for a total of thirteen half-hour episodes. | February 28, 1998 | 70 minutes |
| Fake フェイク (Feiku) | Japan | Iku Suzuki | J.C.Staff | Traditional | Direct-to-video; OVA | | April 21, 1998 | 58 minutes |
| FernGully 2: The Magical Rescue | United States | Phil Robinson; Dave Marshall | WildBrain; Wang Film Productions | Traditional | Direct-to-video | Sequel to FernGully: The Last Rainforest (1992). | March 17, 1998 | 72 minutes |
| Fire Force DNAsights 999.9 火聖旅団 ダナサイト999.9 (Kasei Ryodan Danasaito 999.9) | Japan | Masayuki Kojima | Madhouse h.m.p. | Traditional | Theatrical | | December 18, 1998 | 50 minutes |
| Galaxy Express 999: Eternal Fantasy 銀河鉄道９９９ エターナルファンタジー (Ginga Tetsudō Surī Nain: Eternal Fantasy) | Japan | Kazuo Yamazaki | Toei Animation | Traditional | Theatrical | | March 7, 1998 | 121 minutes |
| Gen^{13} | United States | Kevin Altieri | WildStorm Productions; Aegis Entertainment | Traditional | | | July 17, 1998 | 86 minutes |
| General Chaos: Uncensored Animation | United States | Keith Alcorn; Laurence Arcadias; Joel Brinkerhoff; Vince Collins; David Donar; Stefan Eling; Eric Fogel; Mr. Lawrence; Brandon McKinney; Tony Nittoli; Bill Plympton; Walter Santucci; Jeff Sturgis | | Various | Anthology film | | February 6, 1998 | 81 minutes |
| Golgo 13: Queen Bee ゴルゴ13〜QUEEN BEE〜 (Gorugo Sātīn: Kuīn Bī) | Japan | Osamu Dezaki | BMG Victor; Filmlink International; Goodhill Vision; Tezuka Productions | Traditional | Direct-to-video; OVA | | May 21, 1998 | 57 minutes |
| Grandma and Her Ghosts 魔法阿媽 (Mofa ama) | Taiwan | Wang Saudi; Lee Chun-Man | Plus One Entertainment; Inada Film Studio; Rice Film International Co. Ltd. | Traditional | Theatrical | | April 3, 1998 | 80 minutes |
| Gundam Wing: Endless Waltz -Special Edition- 新機動戦記ガンダムＷ Endless Waltz 特別篇 (Shin Kidō Senki Gandamu Uingu: Endoresu Warutsu Supesharu) | Japan | Yasunao Aoki | Sunrise | Traditional | Theatrical | Originally released as a three-part OVA. | August 1, 1998 | 90 minutes |
| Gurin with the Foxtail; Solan, Ludvig og Gurin med reverompa | Norway | John M. Jacobsen; Nille Tystad | Filmkameratene A/S; AnimagicNet A/S; Svensk Filmindustri (SF) | Traditional | Theatrical | First animated feature from Norway. | August 7, 1998 | 76 minutes |
| H.C. Andersen's The Long Shadow; H.C. Andersen og den skæve skygge | Denmark | Jannik Hastrup | Dansk Tegnefilm Kompagni; Konsortiet H.C. Andersens Lange Skygge; Northern Lights (co-production); SVT Drama (co-production); Trust Film Svenska (co-production); Zentropa Productions | Traditional | Theatrical | | January 16, 1998 | 78 minutes |
| Hercules | Italy | Peter Choi | Mondo TV; Hahn Shin Corporation (animation production, uncredited) | Traditional | Television film Compilation film | Compilation film of the four-episode storyline from the animated television series Super Little Fanta Heroes, an anthology series that ran a total of thirty half-hour episodes. | | 89 minutes |
| Hercules and Xena – The Animated Movie: The Battle for Mount Olympus | United States | Lynne Naylor | Renaissance Pictures; Universal Cartoon Studios | Traditional | Direct-to-video | | January 6, 1998 | 80 minutes |
| The King of Kings: Jesus | Italy; South Korea | Su-yong Jeong | Antoniano di Bologna; Mondo TV; RAI Radiotelevisione Italiana (in association with); Hahn Shin Corporation (animation production, uncredited) | Traditional | Television film Compilation film | Compilation film of the animated television series Jesus: A Kingdom Without Frontiers, that ran for a total of 26 half-hour episodes. | February 14, 1998 | 89 minutes |
| Kirikou and the Sorceress; Kirikou et la Sorcière | France; Belgium; Luxembourg | Michel Ocelot | France 3 Cinéma; Les Armateurs; Monipoly Productions; Odec Kid Cartoons; Rija Studio; Studio O Trans Europe Film | Traditional | Theatrical | | December 9, 1998 | 71 minutes |
| Królestwo Zielonej Polany. Powrót; The Kingdom of Green Glade. Return | Poland | Krzysztof Kiwerski; Longin Szmyd | Studio Filmów Animowanych w Krakowie; Agencja Produkcji Filmowej | Traditional | | | April 24, 1998 | 68 minutes |
| The Land Before Time VI: The Secret of Saurus Rock | United States | Charles Grosvenor | Universal Cartoon Studios | Traditional | Direct-to-video | Sixth installment in The Land Before Time film series and the final installment to use cel animation. | December 1, 1998 | 76 minutes |
| The Legend of Mulan | Netherlands | Darko Perovic | Django Studios | Traditional | Direct-to-video | | | 50 minutes |
| The Legend of Su-Ling | United States | Diane Eskenazi (uncredited) | Golden Films; Sony Pictures (distributor) | Traditional | Direct-to-video | | May 26, 1998 | 48 minutes |
| The Lion King II: Simba's Pride | United States | Darrell Rooney | Walt Disney Television Animation; Disney Video Premiere | Traditional | Direct-to-video | Sequel to The Lion King (1994). | October 27, 1998 | 82 minutes |
| The Little Magic Flute; Die kleine Zauberflöte | Germany | Curt Linda | Linda Film; MFA+ FilmDistribution. (distributor) | Traditional | Theatrical | | January 8, 1998 | 62 minutes |
| The Little Mermaid | Australia | Geoff Beak; Susan Beak | Burbank Animation Studios | Traditional | Direct-to-video | | | 50 minutes |
| Lucky and Zorba; La gabbianella e il gatto | Italy | Enzo D'Alò | La Lanterna Magica | Traditional | Theatrical | Winner a special Nastro d'Argento and the audience award at the Montréal International Children's Film Festival. | December 23, 1998 | 75 minutes |
| Lupin III: Crisis in Tokyo; Rupan Sansei: Honō no Kioku ~Tokyo Crisis~ (ルパン三世『炎の記憶 ～Tokyo Crisis』) | Japan | Toshiya Shinohara | Tokyo Movie Shinsha; Nippon TV | Traditional | Television special | | July 24, 1998 | 95 minutes |
| Luminous Visions | United States | Steven Churchill | Odyssey Productions | Computer | Direct-to-video; Art film Compilation film | Third installment of The Mind's Eye Presents sister series, a follow-up of the original Mind's Eye series. | December 25, 1998 | 45 minutes |
| The Magic Forest; Hänsel und Gretel im Zauberwald | Germany | Volker Collmann | Fama Film AG; Iris Group; Iris Productions | Traditional | Television film | | | 60 minutes |
| The Magic Pipe; Волшебная свирель (Volshebnaya Svirel) | Russia | Mikhail Tumelya | AF-Zentr (participation); FAF Entertainment | Stop motion | Television film | | | 47 minutes |
| MAZE ☆ The Mega-Burst Space: The Giant of Temporary Threat ＭＡＺＥ☆爆熱時空 天変脅威の大巨人 (Maze Bakunetsu Jikū: Tenpen Kyōi no Giant) | Japan | Iku Suzuki | J.C. Staff; Toei Company | Traditional | Theatrical | | April 25, 1998 | 42 minutes |
| The Mighty Kong | United States | Art Scott | L.A. Animation; Lana Productions; Hahn Shin Corporation | Traditional | Direct-to-video | Animated musical adaptation of the 1933 film King Kong. | June 16, 1998 | 71 minutes |
| Mobile Suit Gundam: The 08th MS Team – Miller's Report 機動戦士ガンダム 第08MS小隊 ミラーズ・リポート (Kidō Senshi Gundam: Dai 08 MS Shōtai – Miller's Report) | Japan | Mitsuko Kase; Takeyuki Kanda; Umanosuke Iida | Sunrise | Traditional | Theatrical | Originally released as a twelve-part OVA. | August 1, 1998 | 51 minutes |
| Money, A Mythology of Darkness | Greece | Vassilis Mazomenos | Greek Film Centre; Horme Pictures; Oionos | Computer | Theatrical | First European 3D animation feature film. | November 17, 1998 | 70 minutes |
| Moses: Egypt's Great Prince | United States | Horseman Cao; Arthur Wu (uncredited) | Schwartz & Company (uncredited); UAV Entertainment; Animation Ink; Hong Ying Animation Company; Suzhou Hong Ying Animation Company (uncredited) | Traditional | Direct-to-video | | July 13, 1998 | 51 minutes |
| Mu-lan | Italy | Alessandro Bulath | Avo Film Edizioni | Traditional | Direct-to-video | | | 60 minutes |
| Mulan | Australia | Geoff Beak; Susan Beak | Burbank Animation Studios | Traditional | Direct-to-video | | | 50 minutes |
| Mulan | United States | Tony Bancroft; Barry Cook | Walt Disney Feature Animation | Traditional | Theatrical | First film fully produced at the Florida division of Walt Disney Feature Animation. | June 19, 1998 | 87 minutes |
| Otoko wa Tsurai yo: Torajirō Wasure na Kusa 男はつらいよ ～寅次郎忘れな草～ (It's Tough Being a Man: Tora-san's Forget Me Not) | Japan | Setsuko Shibuichi | Eiken; Magic Bus; Tokyo Broadcasting System | Traditional | Television special | Animated adaptation of the 1973 film Tora-san's Forget Me Not, the eleventh installment of the Otoko wa Tsurai yo film series. | August 7, 1998 | 114 minutes |
| Papyrus: Seth's Revenge; Une aventure de Papyrus - La vengeance de Seth (A Papyrus Adventure - The Vengeance of Seth) | French; Canada | Michel Gauthier | Dupuis Audiovisuel; MediaToon; Medver Inc. TF1 (distributor) | Traditional | Television film Compilation film | Compilation film of episodes 1–3, 6–8, 13 and 14 of the animated television series Papyrus, based on the comic series of the same title by Lucien De Gieter. | | 73 minutes |
| Pocahontas II: Journey to a New World | United States | Tom Ellery; Bradley Raymond | Walt Disney Television Animation; Disney Video Premiere | Traditional | Direct-to-video | Sequel to Pocahontas (1995). | August 25, 1998 | 72 minutes |
| Pokémon: The First Movie – Mewtwo Strikes Back 劇場版ポケットモンスター ミュウツーの逆襲 (Gekijōban Poketto Monsutā: Myūtsū no Gyakushū) | Japan | Kunihiko Yuyama | Toho; Warner Bros. Pictures; OLM, Inc. | Traditional | Theatrical | First installment of the Pokémon film series. | July 18, 1998 | 75 minutes |
| The Prince of Egypt | United States | Simon Wells; Brenda Chapman; Steve Hickner | DreamWorks Pictures; DreamWorks Animation | Traditional | Theatrical | The highest grossing non-Disney traditionally animated feature until The Simpsons Movie (2007). | December 18, 1998 | 99 minutes |
| Prince of the Nile: The Story of Moses | Australia | | Burbank Animation Studios | Traditional | Direct-to-video | | | 50 minutes |
| Quest for Camelot | United States | Frederik Du Chau | Warner Bros. Animation | Traditional | Theatrical | | May 15, 1998 | 86 minutes |
| Reise um die Erde in 80 Tagen; Around the World in Eighty Days | China; Germany | Manfred Durniok; Hong Hu Zhao | Shanghai Animation Film Studio | Stop motion | Theatrical | | November 8, 1998 | 90 minutes |
| Rudolph the Red-Nosed Reindeer: The Movie | United States | William R. Kowalchuk | Golden Books Family Entertainment; Tundra Productions | Traditional | Direct-to-video | | October 16, 1998 | 92 minutes |
| The Rugrats Movie | United States | Igor Kovalyov; Norton Virgien | Paramount Pictures (distributor); Nickelodeon Movies; Klasky Csupo | Traditional | Theatrical | First non-Disney animated film to gross over $100,000,000 at the box office. | November 20, 1998 | 80 minutes |
| Scooby-Doo on Zombie Island | United States | Jim Stenstrum | Hanna-Barbera; Warner Bros. Animation | Traditional | Direct-to-video | The sixth Scooby-Doo film overall, and the first installment in the franchise's direct-to-video series. | September 22, 1998 | 77 minutes |
| The Secret of Mulan | United States; China | Peter Fernandez (also a voice director) | Schwartz & Co. Hong Ying Animation | Traditional | Direct-to-video | Third and final film in the UAV The Secret of... series. | July 10, 1998 | 50 minutes |
| The Secret of NIMH 2: Timmy to the Rescue | United States | Dick Sebast | Metro-Goldwyn-Mayer Animation | Traditional | Direct-to-video | Sequel to The Secret of NIMH (1982). | December 22, 1998 | 69 minutes |
| Silant Legend; Silat Legenda | Malaysia | Hassan Abd Muthalib | | Traditional | Theatrical | | August 27, 1998 | 90 minutes |
| Slayers Gorgeous スレイヤーズごうじゃす (Sureiyāzu gōjasu) | Japan | Hiroshi Watanabe | J.C.Staff | Traditional | Theatrical | Fourth installment in the Slayers film series. | August 1, 1998 | 64 minutes |
| Socialisation of the Bull? Socializacija bika? | Slovenia | Zvonko Coh; Milan Eric | E-motion Film; RTV Slovenija; SKUC | Traditional | Theatrical | First animated feature from Slovenia. | May 20, 1998 | 78 minutes |
| The Spirit of Mickey | Australia | | Walt Disney Productions; Walt Disney Home Video | Traditional | Direct-to-video; Compilation film | Film compiled from Disney theatrical animated shorts and footage from Walt Disney's Wonderful World of Color and The Mickey Mouse Club; originally made to coincide with Mickey Mouse's 70th anniversary that year. | July 14, 1998 | 83 minutes |
| Soreike! Anpanman Tenohira o Taiyō ni それいけ! アンパンマン てのひらを太陽に (Let's Go! Anpanman: The Palm of the Hand to the Sun) | Japan | Akinori Nagaoka | Shochiku-Fuji Ltd. (distributor); Tokyo Movie Shinsha | Traditional | Theatrical | | July 25, 1998 | 55 minutes |
| Spriggan スプリガン (Supurigan) | Japan | Hirotsugu Kawasaki | Toho (distributor); Studio 4°C | Traditional | Theatrical | | September 5, 1998 | 91 minutes |
| The Story of Rennyo 蓮如物語 (Rennyo Monogatari) | Japan | Osamu Kasai | Toei Animation | Traditional | Theatrical | | | |
| The Swan Princess: The Mystery of the Enchanted Kingdom a. k. a. The Mystery of the Enchanted Treasure | United States | Richard Rich | Nest Family Entertainment; Rich Animation Studios | Traditional | Direct-to-video | Third installment in The Swan Princess film series. | August 4, 1998 | 71 minutes |
| A Tale of Egypt | United States | | Golden Films; Sony Wonder (distributor) | Traditional | Direct-to-video | | June 19, 1998 | 46 minutes |
| Touch: Miss Lonely Yesterday タッチ Miss Lonely Yesterday あれから君は… (Tatchi Misu Rōnrī Iesutādei Are kara Kimi ha...) | Japan | Gisaburō Sugii (chief); Akinori Nagaoka; Ryūichi Kimura (assistant) | Group TAC; Nippon TV | Traditional | Television special | | December 11, 1998 | 93 minutes |
| The Untouchables vs Al Catone; Los Intocables contra Al Catone | Spain | | BRB Internacional S.A. | Traditional | Television film Compilation film | Compilation film of the animated television series The Untouchables of Elliot Mouse, that ran from 1996 until 1997 for a total of 26 half-hour episodes. | | 75 minutes |
| Visitor | Japan | Atsushi Tokuda | GAGA Pictures avex JIC; WOWOW; Amuse Soft Entertainment, Inc. | Computer/Traditional | Television film | | November 7, 1998 | 84 minutes |
| What Neighbours are Animals! ¡Qué vecinos tan animales! | Spain | Maite Ruiz de Austri | Extra Extremadura de Audiovisuales S.A. Artes Audiovisuales; Libre; Junta de Extremadura; Ayuntamiento de Ciceres | Traditional | Theatrical | | September 4, 1998 | 66 minutes |
| The Whip Master; Der Peitschenmeister | Germany | Daniel Nocke | Filmakademie Baden-Württemberg; Zweites Deutsches Fernsehen (ZDF) | Stop motion | | | | 56 minutes |
| Le Voyage de la Souris; The Fantastic Journey of a Special Mouse | France | Anne Caprile | Archimède International | Stop motion | Compilation film | Film compiled from independent animated shorts. | | 65 minutes |

== Highest-grossing animated films of the year ==
| Rank | Title | Studio | Worldwide gross | Ref. |
|---|---|---|---|---|
| 1 | A Bug's Life | Pixar | $363,398,565 | |
| 2 | Mulan | Walt Disney Animation | $304,320,254 | |
| 3 | The Prince of Egypt | DreamWorks | $218,613,188 | |
| 4 | Antz | DreamWorks / Pacific Data Images | $171,757,863 | |
| 5 | Pokémon: The First Movie | OLM, Inc. | $163,644,622 | |
| 6 | The Rugrats Movie | Nickelodeon Movies / Klasky Csupo | $140,894,675 | |
| 7 | Quest for Camelot | Warner Bros. Feature Animation | $38,172,500 | |
| 8 | Doraemon: Nobita's Great Adventure in the South Seas | Asatsu | $21,010,000 | |
| 9 | Case Closed: The Fourteenth Target | TMS Entertainment | $14,528,588 | |
| 10 | Crayon Shin-chan: Blitzkrieg! Pig's Hoof's Secret Mission | Shin-Ei Animation | $8,243,000 | |

== See also ==
- List of animated television series of 1998
