= List of Monkey Magic TV episodes =

This is a list of episodes from the anime series Monkey Magic.

== Episodes ==
No.	Title	Japanese air date	English air date
1	"Enter Stone Monkey"; Transliteration: "Stone Monkey, the World's Strongest!" (Japanese: 世界一強い石ザル)	December 31, 1999	September 19, 1998
Dearth Voyd discovers that a meteor is going to fall on the Earth. So, he sends Batty to find the Meteor and bring it back for his use. Meanwhile, an egg begins to hatch on top of a mountain that could change monkeys forever...
2	"Wild Trance-formation"; Transliteration: "Settle It with the Clone-Technique" (Japanese: 分身術でキメろ!)	January 7, 2000	September 26, 1998
As Stone Monkey climbs the mountain, Subodye's disciples stop him. They challenge him. Stone Monkey passes their test, but they won't let him through. Subodye sees this and takes action, letting him through himself. Subodye then shows all of his disciples the clone technique, but it's not that simple. He tells his disciples that who ever discovers that technique first will be ranked number one!
3	"Zooming On The Jet Cloud"; Transliteration: "It's Mine! The Flying Cloud" (Japanese: いただき!キント雲)	January 14, 2000	October 3, 1998
Kongo gets excited after he sees the master on a cloud, thinking that would be his new technique that he would have to learn. Thus, he follows Subodye through the forest, and finds his little hideout.
4	"Duel With Prince Nata"; Transliteration: "The Battle With Prince Nata" (Japanese: ナーダ太子との戦い)	January 21, 2000	October 10, 1998
Prince Nata stops Kongo, and they begin to fight! Kongo uses the cloning technique, tricks Prince Nata, and goes back home to save everyone. Prince Nata eventually arrives to defeat Kongo in a re-match. The two fight in a duel and Kongo wins! Just as he's about to finish off Prince Nata, Fania arrives and tells him to spare Nata. Kongo listens to her and lets him go.
5	"The Celestial Fleet Cruises Out"; Transliteration: "Attack of the Galaxy Fleet" (Japanese: 銀河艦隊の襲撃だ!)	January 28, 2000	October 17, 1998
Kongo organizes a special team of monkey commandos to intercept the Celestial Heavens' warships. Capturing one of the ships, Kongo begins his attack upon the fleet. In the Celestial Heavens, the Prime Minister proposes an idea: "Appease Kongo by giving him a job in the Celestial Heavens!"
6	"The Celestial Heavens"; Transliteration: "Major Victory" (Japanese: 大勝利)	February 4, 2000	October 24, 1998
While Kongo accepts this honor, he later finds out that his job is the lowest-ranking one in all of Celestial Heavens. Furious, Kongo demands the prime minister's job.
7	"Supervisor of The Imperial Stable"; Transliteration: "I'm the great hitsubaon!" (Japanese: 俺さまはヒツバオン!)	February 11, 2000	October 31, 1998
Facing one of the strongest warriors in all of the Celestial Heavens, Kong must defeat him in order to realize his wish. Will Kongo overcome this newest opponent?!
8	"Peach Party Pandemonium"; Transliteration: "A formidable foe! Jirôma" (Japanese: 強敵!次郎真君)	February 18, 2000	November 7, 1998
A huge party is held in the Celestial Heavens! Will Kongo be able to make the party in time for his arrival?
9	"The Mighty Power Rod"; Transliteration: "The ultimate weapon: Nyoi-bô" (Japanese: 最終兵器·如意棒)	February 25, 2000	November 14, 1998
Kongo and Lord Refang begin their fight. Kongo continuously scurries in fear, while Refang himself almost purposely in perception destroys many of the heavenly pillars holding up the roof of the area they had been within. After much destruction, Refang is forced to chase after the fleeing Kongo. This is so, until Kongo decides to fight back against Refang. After Kongo sees that Refang can manipulate his weapon at will, Kongo himself fights back with many weapons - thanks to Wowser. Refang however seems to favor his axe, in which he strikes down on Kongo's head. After Lao Tzu tells Refang to cease for a moment, Kongo turns into a bird to flee from Refang's sight. Refang this transforms himself into a larger bird, and continues to overpower Kongo in his transformations. Refeng then follows by chasing after the fearful Kongo until Kongo ends up in Lao Tzu's immortal furnace. Thus Refang rejoices in his triumph, until Kongo emerges alives, angry and wielding the unbeatable power rod.
10	"The Invincible Guardian"; Transliteration: "An Encounter With Buddha" (Japanese: 釈迦との遭遇)	March 4, 2000	November 21, 1998
The Celestial Heavens, nearly in flames by Kongo's anger over his job. Goddess Blossom plays along acting as she had been defeated until Kongo had even gone to the extent of holding the Jade Emperor himself hostage. Then Goddess Blossom effectively summons The Guardian to help before Kongo does more evil. When The Guardian appears before Kongo, he experiments with his abilities -- The Guardian will see if Kongo can escape from the very palm of his hand; if Kongo happens to succeed (in which it is impossible), The Guardian will grant Kongo the title of Jade Emperor. After Kongo is astounded over his failure, The Guardian banishes Kongo to the earth with a large stone hand sealed over him.
11	"Sanzoh to the Rescue"; Transliteration: "Burn, Sanzô!" (Japanese: 燃えよ三蔵!)	March 11, 2000	November 28, 1998
After Kongo is subdued for over the time period of 50 decades, Lady Blossom had regularly appeared before Kongo at random times as a canary to feed Kongo and deliver him insight -- never at any point did Kongo actually realize that this bird was truly Lady Blossom. Soon enough, Lady Blossom contacts Sanzo in her canary form and indirectly tells him about his future journey. Later, we then see Sanzoh. He walked up to a large stone hand before his eyes and realize that a small monkey is calling for his help beneath it. Soon enough after Kongo promises Sanzoh that he will protect him with his life during their journey, Sanzoh recites a buddhist mantra that unseals the large stone atop Kongo. After Kongo is effectively freed, both Sanzoh and his new ally head out on their journey further west. After Sanzoh continued on his journey, he is at first confronted by a set of six bandits. When Kongo strikes fear into the bandits' hearts, they all flee for their lives;
12	"The Quest Begins"; Transliteration: "Surrender at Kinkokan!" (Japanese: キンコカンで降参だ!)	March 18, 2000	December 5, 1998
After both Sanzoh and Kongo had continued on their journey westward, they soon ran into this little girl who is an apparition. Kongo flees after her, for he knows that she is truly a demon dragon only in human form. Soon enough, Sanzoh would receive the gold banded headband from Lady Blossom; it would be put on Kongo to control him. Following this point, Sanzoh would end up finding a neighboring village to stay in. When Kongo was with him during a following banquet, Sanzoh convinced that this gold headband was the "new fashion". Thus, Kongo is easily tricked into wearing this headband. Sanzoh would once again rise to the occasion when Kongo tries attacking the small young girl for the second time -- Sanzo recites his binding spell which binds Kongo in place. After Kongo leaves and Sanzoh ends up being taken away to a neighboring mountain - to be used as a meal - Sanzoh expresses a level of regret towards his previous sayings to Kongo.
13	"Slimelord, The Monster Eel"; Transliteration: "Heading to India" (Japanese: 天竺への旅立ち)	March 25, 2000	December 12, 1998
After the little girl "Runlay" stole Sanzoh and effectively placed him before Slime Lord, Slime Lord would then make the preparations of boiling Sanzoh as a specific type of food -- an action that Dearth Voyd hopes will make Kongo ally with the Underworld. After Kongo enters in as a fly and attempts to cut Sanzoh's bonds loose, Slime Lord pursues Kongo with due persistence. After Kongo creates a fake Sanzoh with his hairs, Slime Lord becomes distracted, while Kongo then heads back to free the real Sanzoh. Soon enough however, Slime Lord would return in good time and duel it out with Kongo with his large cleaving sword. After some time passes and Kongo realizes that his hits have no effect on Slime Lord - his body is of rubbery slime like substance - Slime Lord suddenly unleashes his true form -- as a very large eel. Before Slime Lord has a chance to destroy Kongo in his true state, the young girl would transform herself into a dragon and duel it out with Slime Lord in defiance. After Kongo manages to retrieve her dragon stone, the young girl is able to defeat the Slime Lord with true ease. Following this point, Slime Lord would be seen as a small eel (small enough to fit in a small sack). Through Sanzoh's orders, Kongo frees the now rather small Slime Lord into a neighboring pond and then continues on their very long journey west.
