= List of Record of Lodoss War episodes =

Two anime series based on the Record of Lodoss War novels and role playing games have been released in Japan in various forms. The first series, a 13 episode original video animation (OVA) produced by Madhouse Studios, was released in VHS format from June 30, 1990, through November 20, 1991. In 1998, AIC produced a 27-episode anime television series that continued the story of the first OVA series, but ignored its last third in order to adapt the original novel series more faithfully. Record of Lodoss War: Chronicles of the Heroic Knight premiered on TV Tokyo on April 1, 1998, and ran until its conclusion on September 30, 1998. A theatrical short, Welcome to Lodoss Island was released on April 25, 1998. Directed by Kōichi Chigira, the short features a series of comedy skits.

Both Record of Lodoss War and Record of Lodoss War: Chronicles of the Heroic Knight were licensed for an English language release in North America by Central Park Media.

== Episode list ==
=== Record of Lodoss War (1990) ===
No.	Title	Original release date
1	"Prologue to the Legend"; Transliteration: "Densetsu e no Joshō" (Japanese: 伝説への序章)	June 30, 1990
A group of adventurers, Parn the knight, Deedlit the elf, Ghim the dwarf, Woodchuck the thief, Slayn the wizard, and Etoh the cleric, enter the ruins of a great dwarven hall. After fending off an attack by gargoyles, they continue further into the hall, certain they are not alone. Deedlit is caught in a trap, and when Parn tries to rescue her, he is caught himself and they are separated from the others. In a flashback, we learn that Parn and his group have been tasked by King Fahn to find the sage, Wort, to see if he can provide them any information about Karla, the Grey Witch. Deedlit and Parn find a mural depicting an epic battle between the gods twenty years ago. As they continue through the catacombs, they awaken a green dragon. Unable to fight it, they attempt to run past it but are trapped when the rest of their group arrives. Together they are able to defeat the dragon, but his thrashing body causes the catacombs to collapse and force the group to flee the hall.
2	"Blazing Departure"; Transliteration: "Honō no Tabidachi" (Japanese: 炎の出発)	August 30, 1990
In an origin episode, Ghim sets out to find Leylia, Neese's daughter who has disappeared. Meanwhile Parn steps in to save Liara from a group of attacking goblins. Once the goblins have dispersed Etoh appears and together they return to Parn's village. However the locals are unhappy at the death of one of the goblins as they know the goblins will want retribution against the village. It is revealed that Parn's father was a disgraced knight. Elsewhere Ghim meets up with Slayn, whilst an elf notices goblins on the march. Parn dons his father's armour and Etoh accompanies him to destroy the goblins. After killing two goblins they are notified by the elf that the village is under attack. They hurry back while Slayn arrives at the village and kills several goblins. Parn fights the goblin leader and is nearly defeated but finally kills him after being given strength by Slayn. The locals are annoyed with Parn for bringing about the attack on the village but the elder decides instead on banishment that Parn should investigate the source of the evil befalling Lodoss. Etoh, Ghim and Slayn join him whilst the elf looks down from above.
3	"The Black Knight"; Transliteration: "Kokui no Kishi" (Japanese: 黒衣の騎士)	September 30, 1990
Deedlit, the elf, makes herself known to Parn. Suddenly they are attacked by a dark elf leading a band of kobolds. The others arrive and scare the attackers away before the group are arrested by Alanian soldiers. In the dungeon the group meet Woodchuck who updates them about the invasion of Alania and Kannon by Marmo and he also tells them the strongest knights are in Valis. The dark elf reports back to Lord Ashram and Karla send Ashram to attack fortress Myce where the group are held. Meanwhile Beld and Wagnard's army are on the verge of conquering Shining Hill in Kanon. Back at the dungeon the captain of the guards meets the group and realises Etoh is a priest and releases the group and also confirms Woodchuck's information. Later that night Ashram's army attacks and overwhelm the fortress defences. The heavily wounded captain saves Deedlit by killing the dark elf and Parn rescues Woodchuck from the dungeons. He instructs the group to leave Myce before riding out to meet Ashram where he is killed.
4	"The Grey Witch"; Transliteration: "Haiiro no Majo" (Japanese: 灰色の魔女)	October 31, 1990
Unable to enter Alan, the capital of Alania, the group is informed that Alania will not resist Marmo but will not become its slaves. When Lodoss hears of the invasion, King Fahn of Valis dispatches his own daughter, Princess Fianna, to establish an alliance with Alania to oppose Beld. Meanwhile Karla decides to intercept the princess on behalf of Beld. The group decide to go straight to Valis via the Forest Of No Return to save time. Deedlit protects the group during their passage through but Woodchuck, Ghim and Parn are almost killed after seeing hallucinations including one where Ghim sees Leylia and tries to follow her. The group manage to make it to the other side and Ghim tells the group about his task to find Leylia. They chance upon the princess' carriage under attack by Karla's magic. Ghim identifies Karla as Leylia and due to her respect of the group's courage, she releases Princess Fannia before disappearing. Beld remembers Fahn actions from 30 years ago and swears that Valis is next. The episode ends with the dragon Narse calling out to Wagnard who thinks it is Kardis herself causing his powers to flare up.
5	"The Desert King"; Transliteration: "Sabaku no Ō" (Japanese: 砂漠の王)	November 30, 1990
King Kashue, the mercenary king of Flaim, makes his way towards Valis to meet King Fahn. On his way he briefly meets Prince Jester of Moss and later Karla introduces herself to him. The group are given an audience with King Fahn and they celebrate their rescue of Princess Fannia. King Kashue makes his entrance and Parn seems particularly awestruck with him, to Deedlit's annoyance. Woodchuck quietly slips out and plays dice with the guards. When he is discovered cheating he is kicked out the guards barracks. He wanders round the castle and notices dead guards who have been slain by the prisoner Naba whom Karla has released. Rushing back to the celebration ball which Naba has crashed as he attempts to kill Kashue, Woodchuck throws Parn a sword and he distracts Naba long enough for Kashue to kill him. Later when Kashue is teaching Parn to swordfight Karla makes another appearance. Unsure of her motivations King Fahn, Kashue and Prince Jester decide to send Parn to travel to Wort to discover more about Karla. Meanwhile an advance raiding party led by Lord Ashram wipe out the Valis border guards enabling Beld to advance into Valis.
6	"The Sword of the Dark Emperor"; Transliteration: "Ankokuō no Ken" (Japanese: 暗黒王の剣)	December 20, 1990
The Marmo forces attack Valis leaving nothing behind but scorched earth in a ploy to draw Fahn out to Beld. Having learnt Karla's intentions from Wort, the group races back to Valis. Upon meeting some badly injured villagers, Parn, Deedlit and Woodchuck leave to inform King Fahn of what is happening while the others stay to help the injured. Parn informs King Fahn that if the balance of power in Lodoss is tipped, Karla makes an appearance to affect the course of history. Parn is offered the armour of a Holy Knight of Valis but politely refuses in favour of wearing his father's, but does accept the shield. King Fahn recounts to Parn a tale of how he and his knights united Valis long ago. He tells of Shooting Star, a dragon the people of Flaim, and the tribesmen demanded Princess Fianna as a sacrifice to appease the dragon. Fahn agrees but his knight Tesseus (Parn's disgraced father) hatches a plan to go rogue and rescue her. The plan is successful and Tesseus leaves to the front disgraced. Emperor Beld realises the Narse is restless and ponders who is summoning it. Kashue's army engages the enemy and suffers huge losses as King Fahn's forces prepare to move out.
7	"The War of Heroes"; Transliteration: "Eiyū Sensō" (Japanese: 英雄戦争)	February 28, 1991
As Fahn's army marches out they receive news that Kashue's troops are being cut down. Rushing off to help, they fail to realise in the fog that it is a trap to lure Fahn out. As the fog clears, a brutal battle ensues. Parn recognises Lord Ashram and attacks him. Deedlit tries to help but is distracted by Pirotess, the dark elf. Managing to outfight the Marmo army Fahn calls out to Beld to face him. Beld appears and the two old friends engage in a duel to the death. During their fight Parn hears Wort's message to remove Karla's true, her circlet on her head. Wort says that Karla aims to keep Lodoss at war to avoiding tipping the balance of power in one direction but it will mean greater disasters will befall Lodoss. Beld manages to strike down Fahn but is then killed by Karla as Wagnard observes from afar. A magical storm brews awakening the dragons and Lord Ashram takes Beld's magical sword before leading away the Marmo army. Parn surveys the carnage and vows to end Karla's campaign of suffering.
8	"Requiem for Warriors"; Transliteration: "Senshi no Requiem" (Japanese: 戦士の鎮魂歌)	April 30, 1991
After mistaking Deedlit for a Marmo dark elf, out-of-work mercenaries Shiris and Orson attack Parn, Woodchuck, Etoh and Deedlit. When Parn disarms Shiris, Orson shows himself to be a berserker, someone possessed by a Hyuri (a spirit of anger). Shiris realises her mistake and tries eventually calms Orson down. Meanwhile Ghim is growing more anxious to free Leylia from Karla's possession and travels to Karla. He implores Karla to leave Leylia but she refuses and attacks him just as the rest of the group arrive. Karla shows Parn her old home of Kastuul, which was destroyed. She justifies that by killing Beld she prevented power over Lodoss from being under the control in just one place and that a war prevents total destruction of Lodoss, avoiding a repeat of Kastuul. She offers Parn to join her to help guide Lodoss with her but it angers him that she treats people as pawns. As the group tries to remove the circlet Karla unleashes her powers on them but Ghim is able to remove it at the cost of his life after bearing the brunt of her power. Leylia is freed from Karla but after Woodchuck disappears it is revealed that Karla has possession over him.
9	"The Scepter of Domination"; Transliteration: "Shihai no Ōshaku" (Japanese: 支配の王錫)	June 30, 1991
Marmo is in chaos, and Lord Ashram is now the ruler. Wagnard demands a high elf sacrifice to call forth Kardis' power so he sends Pirotess to acquire one, which worries Karla. Wagnard tells Ashram that having the Dark Sword means he rules Marmo but by having the Scepter of Domination rules all Lodoss, but it is located in Fire Dragon Mountain. It's dragon, Shooting Star, is terrorising the local villages forcing Kashue to lead a small army to battle against the dragon. Parn is depressed following Ghim and Fahn's deaths, the disappearance of Woodchuck and being refused by Kashue to join his quest for being too reckless. Pirotess tries to kidnap Deedlit, but Parn with the help of Shiris and Orson drive her away. Deedlit tells Parn that the Marmo are headed to Fire Dragon Mountain, where Kashue is going, and Parn rushes off to help, alongside Orson, Shiris and Deedlit.
10	"The Demon Dragon of Fire Dragon Mountain"; Transliteration: "Karyū-zan no Maryū" (Japanese: 火竜山の魔竜)	July 31, 1991
Parn is able to temporarily halt Shooting Star's rampage but in his recklessness burns his hands. Afterwards Shadom informs the group of the dragon's path, a back entrance into Fire Dragon Mountain. He goes on to tell about the three lances possessed by Mairie, the god of war, which can kill the dragon. Parn is allowed to tag along but warned about his recklessness. Meanwhile Ashram's group enters the mountain and retrieves the sceptre, alerting Shooting Star who rushes back to stop him. Deedlit and Pirotess detect each other and the two groups engage each other. The skirmish is broken up when Shooting Star returns. Ashram is saved from Shooting Star by Pirotess who nearly falls to her death but is in turned saved by Ashram. While a spy obtains the sceptre on Wagnard's behalf Orson manages to stab the dragon with the first lance. The dragon writhes in pain causing the cavern to start to collapse, and Kashue leads Parn to stab the dragon with the final two lances with the aid of Deedlit's magic. Pirotess once again saves Ashram from Shooting Star's fire breath before collapsing exhausted in his arms. Ashram finally reciprocates her feelings for him as the platform they are on collapses, an image that stays with Parn as the group exit.
11	"The Wizard's Ambition"; Transliteration: "Madōshi no Yabō" (Japanese: 魔導師の野望)	August 31, 1991
Back at Valis, Deedlit and Parn begin to realise their feelings for each other. King Kashue receives news that Marmo seems to be rejuvenating. Ashram has survived Fire Dragon Mountain and still holds the sword but only Pirotess' circlet remains. Karla tells him to return to Marmo as all Lodoss will go there as Wagnard will attempt to gain Kardis' power. Kashue tasks Parn to deliver a message to the country of Moss to gain more allies and Deedlit recounts the legend of the Scepter of Domination. In Marmo, Wagnard gains immense power from the sceptre and travels out to kidnap the high elf Deedlit in order to resurrect Kardis. Slayn, Leylia, Shiris and Orson notice the dark magic over Parn's location and rush to save him. Wagnard easily defeats Parn and takes Deedlit. Parn reawakens in Valis, having been saved from death by the others. Orson and Shiris carry the message to Prince Jester in Moss while Ashram and Kashue's army make their ways towards Marmo. Princess Fannia lends King Fahn's sword, The Holy Sword, to Parn.
12	"Final Battle! Marmo - The Dark Island"; Transliteration: "Kessen! Ankoku no Marmo" (Japanese: 決戦!暗黒の島)	September 30, 1991
Wagnard begins the resurrection ceremony with Deedlit as the high elf sacrifice. Parn, Etoh, Slayn and Leylia have made it to Marmo and are fighting their way towards the castle. Kashue's army meets up with Prince Jester with Shiris and Orson whilst sailing towards Marmo. Ashram is also fighting his way towards the castle as the ceremonial altar travels deeper beneath Narse the dragon and the buried city. As Kashue's group arrive on Marmo, Narse emerges and guards the castle, blocking anyone from getting near. However Mycen, the golden dragon, arrives and engages Narse. Parn's group has already made it inside but Slayn, Leylia and Etoh battle the monsters and spirits in the buried city allowing Parn to continue deeper to save Deedlit. Ashram is already at the altar and interrupts the ceremony. An angry Wagnard, determined to wield Kardis' power, turns to fight Ashram as Deedlit struggles to hold on to her life.
13	"Lodoss - The Burning Continent"; Transliteration: "Shakunetsu no Lodoss" (Japanese: 灼熱の大地)	November 20, 1991
Parn reaches the bottom and is surprised to see the still alive Ashram struggling against Wagnard as Deedlit slowly loses her life. Topside, Kashue's soldiers are also struggling against creatures that are being continually resurrected by Narse. Wort implores Karla to intervene to protect Lodoss but Karla refuses to act. As Wagnard is distracted by Parn, Ashram strikes the evil wizard down and then turns to face off against Parn. Ashram defeats Parn and is about to finish him when suddenly Wagnard, still alive, grabs him and violently strangles him. Ashram runs Wagnard through delivering a mortal wound before collapsing coughing up blood. Knowing he won't be able to live to control Kardis, in his last act Wagnard destroys the sceptre. Parn takes Ashram's Demon sword and together with King Fahn's Holy sword is able to break the magical hold Kardis has over Deedlit. Mycen finally defeats Narse, destroying the undead monsters on the ground. With the evil forces defeated, Lodoss celebrates. In Valis, Parn is presented with a new sword from King Kashue and promises to meet again before riding off with Deedlit.

=== Record of Lodoss War: Chronicles of the Heroic Knight (1998) ===
No.	Title	Original release date
1	"The Free Knight... A New Legend Begins"; Transliteration: "Jiyū Kishi...Aratanaru Densetsu no Hajimari" (Japanese: 自由騎士...新たなる伝説の始まり)	April 1, 1998
Ashram arrives at the Temple Of Marfa and demands to know about Bramd the ice dragon's treasure, which is one of the Governor's Treasures, to take for himself. His goal is to acquire the Governor's Treasures in order to fulfill his late master's wish by obtaining the Sceptre Of Domination. He reveals to Neese that he killed Bramd and she informs him the treasure was sold off and thus is not the treasure he is after. When Ashram leaves she sends a summons for Leylia, Slayn and their daughter Neese from Zaxon. Elsewhere, Shiris, Orson and a few other enforcers head to Zaxon to collect overdue taxes for Duke Raster. But Cecil, a sorcerer, protects the village so Shiris draws him out into a trap. Deedlit and Parn save Cecil but Orson goes into a berserker rage when Parn defeats Shiris, only calming down as a result of Deedlit's spells. Slayn, Leylia and Neese arrive shortly afterwards informing Parn to go with them back to consult the elder Neese.
2	"Dragon... The Guardian of the Lost History"; Transliteration: "Ryū...Ushinawareta Rekishi no Bannin" (Japanese: 竜...失われた歴史の番人)	April 8, 1998
While Orson is recovering from his battle with Parn, Leylia recalls the story of the fall of the magical kingdom of Kastuul. Following a failed experiment for the sorcerers to gain more powerful magicks, Kastuul was destroyed leading the barbarians to revolt and destroy the city of Kuudo. Kuudo's governor, Saluvan, had dispatched his dragons over Lodoss to guard his treasures so that one day the power of Kastuul would one day be revived. Another Kuudo noble, the sorceress Karla, is killed in the battle but is able to remain immortal by forever transferring her soul to others using the circlet on her head. Slayn recruits Parn, Cecil and Deedlit to stop Ashram from collecting these treasures and Shiris and Orson join them. They deduce where Ashram is heading next and head towards Flaim to recruit King Kashue. In Flaim itself, Ashram attempts to recruit Hobb the priest of Myrii, the god of war, to help him overthrow King Kashue in order to unite Lodoss.
3	"King... The Long Sought Hero"; Transliteration: "Ō...Motomerareta Eiyū" (Japanese: 王...求められた英雄)	April 15, 1998
The group arrive and meet with King Kashue in the capital, Blade, where there is a food shortage due to a large influx of refugees from Western Flaim. They are fleeing the feeding grounds of Shooting Star, the fire dragon, who has taken to attacking the area. Kashue's forces are preparing to kill Shooting Star to free the region to ease the food shortages. Parn offers to help but Slayn points out that Abram, the dragon of Blue Dragon Island, may also have the Sceptre Of Domination and Ashram may be able to acquire it first. He suggests that Parn and Deedlit go with Kashue's army while the rest go to Blue Dragon Island, under the leadership of Orson as a way to help him overcome his berserker rages. Later that night Shiris dances with Parn making Deedlit jealous. Kashue introduces Parn to Spark and suggests that Parn one day becomes the king of Alanis and informs him that Etoh has become the king of Falis. Elsewhere Hobb and Ashram's party survey the damage in Western Flaim.
4	"Pirates... The Ship of Dark Ambitions"; Transliteration: "Kaizoku...Kuroki Yabō o Noseta Fune" (Japanese: 海賊...黒き野望を乗せた船)	April 22, 1998
King Kashue's army rides out to battle Shooting Star, having found out the Hobb has joined Ashram, and Deedlit struggles with her feelings for Parn. In the waters around the port town of Raiden, Alhaib the pirate, under the employ of Ashram, has put a stop to the shipping. Ashram arrives to kill Abram with his group that includes the dark elf Astar and Groder, a sorcerer working for Wagnard who also requires the Sceptre Of Domination as well as the Soul Crystal Ball to resurrect Kardis. Hobb voices his suspicions about Groder to Ashram who is already suspicious of him, as well as the others as agents for other Marmo parties. Orson's group fail to get a ship in Raiden due to the pirate activity and so he decides they will remove the pirate threat, with the aid of Maar the bard, and then take their ship. Later that night Orson attempts to face his demons head on only to end up in a berserker rage and nearly kills the sleeping Shiris but is only just able to stop himself. In Western Flaim, Shooting Star turns to attack Kashue's army.
5	"Demon Sword... The Power to Crush Souls"; Transliteration: "Maken...Tama o Kudaku Chikara" (Japanese: 魔剣...魂を砕く力)	April 29, 1998
While Slayn and Leylia remain in Raiden, Orson and the others locate the pirate ship thanks to Maar and are astonished to find Ashram there. The group is defeated and captured by Ashram's band and Ashram's demon sword calms the spirit of anger behind Orson's berserker rage leading him to be captured as well. Back in Flaim, Shooting Star decimates King Kashue's army. When Kashue wounds the dragon, it vows to kill every last human in revenge. Realising the need for a powerful magic user Kashue decides to go to Raiden to recruit Slayn's help. Ashram sets sail for Blue Dragon Island taking Orson's group with them.
6	"Heart... Tears Reborn"; Transliteration: "Kokoro...Yomigaeru Namida" (Japanese: 心...よみがえる涙)	May 6, 1998
Shiris develops a rivalry with Smeddy, who defeated her earlier. Ashram's ship arrives on Blue Dragon Island and Groder attempts to negotiate with Abram. He learns that the dragon does not guard the Sceptre Of Domination but does have the Soul Crystal Ball. He manipulates the dragon into fighting Ashram's group and, with the help of Hobb's incantation, they kill Abram with Orson as a witness, whose spirit of anger is weakened by the dragon's roar. The events with Ashram help Orson regain his emotions. Groder takes the Soul Crystal Ball and informs Wagnard of its acquisition but when he is ordered to bring it immediately to Wagnard he grows suspicious of him. On the journey back Maar escapes after using magic to put everyone including Orson's group to sleep and then steals the Soul Crystal Ball. Kashue's group arrive in Raiden and meet up with Leylia and Slayn and later with Maar. They defeat Alhaib's pirates and discover that Ashram has already departed for Fire Dragon Mountain. After rescuing Orson's group they witness Shooting Star burn Raiden to the ground. Deciding that stopping Ashram is more important, Kashue and the rest head after Ashram.
7	"Death... A Gentle Heart Bequeathed"; Transliteration: "Shi...Tsutaerareta Yasashiki Kokoro" (Japanese: 死...伝えられた優しき心)	May 13, 1998
The group nearly catches up to Ashram. Whilst resting Orson declares his love for Shiris but since she's annoyed she defiantly states she loves Parn. After an argument she slaps Orson and storms off. When Shooting Star heads off to feed, Ashram and Hobb enter Fire Dragon Mountain leaving the rest to guard against Kashue's group. When the group arrives at the entrance to the mountain a fight ensues. Kashue follows Ashram while the rest battle the guards. Groder summons dragon tooth soldiers to aid them and a magical battle also ensues between the sorcerers. Deedlit battles Astar to a stalemate while Slayn and Cecil engages Groder. Leylia manages to kill Gaberra but Groder escapes. Once again Shiris is defeated by Smeddy and Orson is unable to enter a berserker rage having been cured. He begs the spirit of rage of make him strong again to protect Shiris and the spirit obliges. The berserk Orson cuts down Smeddy and Astar but is mortally wounded. Shiris sees he will die and asks him to strike her down so they can be together forever but he dies before he can kill her.
8	"The Scepter of Domination... The Dream of a United Lodoss"; Transliteration: "Shihai no Ōshaku...Rōdosu Tōitsu Yume" (Japanese: 支配の王錫...ロードス統一の夢)	May 20, 1998
Ashram reaches the chamber containing the Sceptre Of Domination but Shooting Star returns due to the conditions of guarding the treasure. Kashue catches up to Ashram inside the mountain and proposes that they work together to defeat the dragon and duel afterwards for the treasure. Ashram agrees as Parn and the others arrive inside the chamber. Cecil, Deedlit, Leylia and Hobb all cast spells to protect them and the spells distract the dragon long enough for Ashram and Parn to stab Shooting Star in the head causing the dragon to fall into the lava. Ashram and Kashue duel and Kashue is the victor. A desperate Ashram grabs the sceptre but Parn knocks it out of his hands into the lava. Ashram realises he cannot fulfil Emperor Beld's ambition and dives into the lava. The rest leave the chamber and head home with Lodoss safe from all threats.
9	"The Young Knight... Tested Strength"; Transliteration: "Wakaki Kishi...Tamesareru Chikara" (Japanese: 若き騎士...試される力)	May 27, 1998
10 years have passed since the events at Fire Mountain. The elder Neese has since died but had revealed to Slayn that Leylia is actually the reincarnation of Queen Naneel, high priestess of Kardis. Spark is now older but fails to be named as a knight of Flaim. He requests that he joins King Kashue's forces in defeating Marmo's forces but is refused as Kashue wants him to think about things other than war if he Spark is to become king of the flame tribe. Parn is also in Flaim for the banquet to ask Kashue for help in the fight against Marmo. Kashue promises aid once Duke Raster of Alania, who has just allied with the Marmo, is defeated. Meanwhile, outside the treasure house Spark is attacked within the castle walls by a dark elf.
10	"Recovery... A Mission Assigned"; Transliteration: "Dakkai...Ataerareta Ninmu" (Japanese: 奪回...与えられた任務)	June 3, 1998
Spark realises that he is outnumbered by the dark elves and so attempts to sound the alarm but is badly wounded. Parn hears the alarm but the dark elves have already escaped with the treasure, which was guarded by Slayn's magic spell, meaning that a more powerful sorcerer was behind the theft. Spark is healed by the Greevus, a priest of Myrii, while Slayn and King Kashue explain to Parn and Deedlit what was stolen. Wagnard is back and attempting to resurrect Kardis and needs the two keys and the Doorway to do so. The Soul Crystal Ball, one of the keys, was stolen by the dark elves and the other key is the Staff Of Life, kept at the temple of Falis in Valis. The doorway is a live sacrifice but has yet to be revealed. Kashue hires mercenaries Garrack and Leaf the half-elf as well as Greevus and Aldonova the wizard, all under Spark's command, to pursue the dark elves and retrieve the Soul Crystal Ball and deliver a dispatch to King Etoh of Valis. They set off after the dark elves oblivious that Neese is following them at a distance. Parn and Deedlit decide to return to Kanon.
11	"Light... A Girl Guided by the Gods"; Transliteration: "Hikari...Kami ni Michibikareta Shōjo" (Japanese: 光...神に導かれた少女)	June 10, 1998
Randy and Ryna are being pursued by the dark elves and Randy is pierced by the elf magic. Spark's group reach the Southern fortress where the dark elves were spotted and they meet Ryna and a critically ill Randy. Garrack is suspicious of Ryna as why the dark elves did not kill them off. Garrack's suspicions are answered when Greevus attempts to heal Randy but inadvertently sets off a magical trap. Out of Randy's body grows a gigantic multiple headed monster that attacks the fortress. Greevus deduces that to kill the monster they must kill Randy. The group struggle to fight it but eventually work together as a team but Spark's hesitancy to kill Randy means it is now difficult to kill him. However Neese defeats the monster with her magick, killing Randy. Ryna vows to avenge him by joining Spark's mission.
12	"Sallying Forth... Pursuing a Dark Shadow"; Transliteration: "Shutsujin...Kuroi Kage o Otte" (Japanese: 出陣...黒い影を追って)	June 17, 1998
Cecil's forces in Zaxon are forced evacuate to Tarba when they are overrun by a sudden attack by Raster's forces as a new war ignites over Lodoss. Duke Raster has plans to rule over the whole of Lodoss. Spark's group arrive in Hiruto and Spark meets with Governor Randal. Spark is getting frustrated that he cannot help in the war but Randal tries to teach him about responsibilities. Meanwhile Garrack is still suspicious of Ryna's motivations but she allays his fears. She learns that Garrack is not a mercenary but a noble protecting Spark as he may be king of Flaim one day. When news of the dark elves being spotted reaches Hiruto, the group set out joined by Neese, who claims to follow Spark due to being led by her dark nightmare.
13	"Nightmare... The Creeping Dark Power"; Transliteration: "Akumu...Shinobiyoru Ankoku no Chikara" (Japanese: 悪夢...忍び寄る暗黒の力)	June 24, 1998
The group catches up to the dark elves and engage them. After a tough battle in which the dark elves are killed and Ryna is badly wounded, they discover that the dark elves sacrificed themselves as decoys and do not possess the Soul Crystal Ball. After heading back to Hiruto, Neese heals Ryna while the others rest and wait for news. When Ryna wakes she reveals to Spark that she is actually a thief. Disappointed he allows her to stay without turning her over to the authorities. Later that night, Neese's dream is invaded by Wagnard who reveals her to be the Doorway and she is caught by his magick. She lets out a scream that alerts the group and they enter her room to see her surrounded by a dark magical aura.
14	"Doorway... The Truth Proclaimed"; Transliteration: "Tobira...Tsugerareta Shinjitsu" (Japanese: 扉...告げられた真実)	July 1, 1998
Spark and Greevus manage to save Neese from being taken away by the "dark knightmare". Aldonova reveals the truth about Neese and her dark knightmare: In order to resurrect Kardis Wagnard needs her as the Doorway as she has Queen Naneel's blood whereas Leylia is no longer pure after having a child. He also reveals that Wagnard is in extreme pain when he uses dark magicks due to a curse and therefore will not try the same thing again any time soon. Using Ryna's knowledge as a thief to predict the plans of the courier carrying the Soul Crystal Ball, the group head to Valis. There they can protect the Staff of Life as well as deliver the dispatch to King Etoh and intercept the courier at the port of Roid in Valis. Elsewhere in Marmo-controlled Kanon, Parn with Deedlit and Maar meet with the Kanon free army led by Prince Reona and are welcome by Hobb. Hobb informs them that Rabido, the Marmo governor of Kanon, is to be replaced. Outside the governor's residence, Rabido is observed by three dark figures: Ashram, Groder and Pirotess.
15	"An Old Enemy... Reunion with the Black Knight"; Transliteration: "Shukuteki...Kurokishi to no Saikai" (Japanese: 宿敵...黒騎士との再会)	July 8, 1998
Ashram who was saved by Groder from the lava and as a result Wagnard bound Groder's powers confronts the egomaniacal Rabido. However he allows Rabido to head out to defeat the free army in order to totally conquer Kanon and remain as governor. Ashram does not reveal that he is the new governor. As insurance against the free army, Rabido uses the villagers as a shield and hostages to be executed should his forces lose. A spy inform Prince Reona of the hostage situation and so he sends Parn, Hobb, Deedlit and Maar to save them. Meanwhile the free army ambush Rabido's Marmo army and Rabido is killed. Parn enters the village and is surprised to find it empty. Ashram has saved the villagers from Rabido's tyranny and they are now on their way to Rood which Marmo will defend heavily. He intends to unite all of Lodoss as before and so Parn fights him as Pirotess prevents any interference. Ashram easily defeats Parn but refuses to kill him as he says that a king needs subjects and subjects need a king who protects them. But as he walks away he says that their battle will never be over.
16	"The Holy City... Pursuing a Clue"; Transliteration: "Seinaru Miyako...Tegakari o Motomete" (Japanese: 聖なる都...手がかりを求めて)	July 15, 1998
Spark arrives at Valis and delivers the message to King Etoh. The message includes new orders for Spark to return to Flaim if he has failed to retrieve the Soul Crystal Ball. Aldonova helps console Spark by suggesting the group go sightseeing in Roid as cover for finding the courier before the evening banquet. Once there Ryna's knowledge again come in useful and suggests heading to the taverns spreading a rumour about wanting to travel to Kanon, in Marmo territory, to find work as mercenaries. Eventually the strategy seems pays off and a group of men find them, however they are undercover Valis soldiers who attack them for wanting to join Marmo. Aldonova and Leaf cast spells to help the group escape but they are separated. Spark is saved by a man calling himself Jay, who says he will transport them to Kanon.
17	"Decision... An Option Compelled"; Transliteration: "Ketsudan...Semarareta Sentaku" (Japanese: 決断...迫られた選択)	July 22, 1998
In Western Lodoss, the kingdom of Moss is in the midst of a civil war. Duke Redrick, allied with now Queen Shiris, commands the Daragon Eyes dragon riders and the kingdom will soon be reunified. In Alania, King Kashue's army defeats Duke Raster's army and then lays siege to the capital, Alan. When Raster refuses to surrender Kashue knows that this drawn out siege will tie up his forces away from the war against Marmo. In Valis Spark returns to the group and informs them of Jay. Garrack deduces that Jay commands a Marmo warship meaning that Valis will soon be attacked for the Staff Of Life. However Spark is worried that he may disappoint Kashue for refusing his orders to return and also anger Etoh due to the groups's activities earlier, create a crack between the Flaim-Valis alliance without having any solid evidence to back up his theory. Just as they leave to the banquet, they realise Neese has gone to the temple where the staff is kept. Immediately, Spark realises the course of action to take and informs an understanding Etoh of what has transpired. At that point flames are seen near the Temple Of Falis. The group rushes off to save Neese.
18	"Mission... The Path One Follows"; Transliteration: "Shimei...Mizukara Susumu Michi" (Japanese: 使命...自ら進む道)	July 29, 1998
The group arrive near the temple and engage a small Marmo force. Spark goes to find Neese while Garrack and the others hold off the Marmo soldiers. Neese is unable to stop some dark elves from stealing the Staff Of Life when she encounters Jay. Not realising she is the doorway they attack her only for her to be saved by Spark. After killing Jay, the Marmo flee having accomplished their mission and another dark nightmare appears to kidnap Neese. Spark with the help of Garrack, Greevus and Aldonova slow the dark nightmare enough for Neese to wake up and close the portal. Neese decides to go to Marmo to retrieve the keys and the other decide to join her. Etoh gives the group a ship ride to Kanon. Karla is concerned about Wagnard resurrecting Kardis and confronts him about his intentions.
19	"Reunion... In a Distant War-torn Land"; Transliteration: "Saikai...Tōki Senran no Ikoku de" (Japanese: 再会...遠き戦乱の異国で)	August 5, 1998
The group arrive in Marmo-occupied Kanon and decide to head directly to Rood where they can organise transport to Marmo. Neese is eager to prove her use in a fight but Spark feels the need to protect her as his duty. As they travel they come across a scorched village and Neese is attacked by a monster but is saved by Spark. They determine that the monster was brought over from Marmo. At night they take refuge in a cave and Leaf is able to scavenge for food. Spark and Greevus are standing guard when the cave is surrounded by monsters and a Marmo soldier. Garrack, Ryna, Greevus and Leaf engage the monsters whilst Spark, Aldonova followed by Neese try to circle round. Due to their lack of knowledge of the area they become trapped. The soldier summons a large ogre to kill them but Neese casts a spell that saves them and allows Spark to kill it. Back near the cave they discover that the Marmo were transporting food to their frontline and they are interrupted by the Kanon free army. Proving they were sent by King Etoh Parn makes an appearance.
20	"Counterattack... The Stolen Last Hope"; Transliteration: "Raishū...Ubawareta Saigo no Kibō" (Japanese: 来襲...奪われた最後の希望)	August 12, 1998
The group updates Parn about the situation regarding Neese and in turn update the group about the war. King Kashue has killed Duke Raster and Alania has fallen. King Etoh is leading a holy war to rid Valis of the Marmo and King Kashue has now both mobilised his army towards Kanon. Spark leads an ambush by the free army on the Kanon supply lines but they are getting more heavily defended. Having successfully carried out the ambush the free army host a banquet later that night. After Neese heals a small wound on Spark the others tease them about their growing feelings for each other. At the banquet Ryna and Leaf get Spark and Neese to spend even more time together. As they are sharing a tender moment alone Wagnard himself appears and kidnaps Neese and now possesses all the components required to resurrect Kardis.
21	"A Vow... A Step Towards the Future"; Transliteration: "Chikai...Mirai e Susumu Ippo" (Japanese: 誓い...未来へ進む一歩)	August 19, 1998
Spark is distraught as Neese is transported to Marmo and unable to escape. Wagnard reveals that his plan for Kardis is to destroy Lodoss so that he, as a necromancer, can have a kingdom of the dead to rule over. Parn leads the group and the free army to Rood to link up with Prince Reona's forces. Rood is heavily defended by Ashram and Reona charges Spark's group the critical task of taking the city centre due to their abilities whilst the free army take out the strongholds defending the city. In Rood, reports of Karla's movements and sightings reaches Lord Ashram. He knows she is not there to help the free army and Groder informs him that the Marmo council has ordered that the Marmo in Rood will defend to the last man. Ashram is therefore left suspicious of Wagnard's plans and orders Pirotess to assemble as many ships as she can.
22	"Liberation... A Path Opened"; Transliteration: "Kaihō...Akareta Michi" (Japanese: 解放...開かれた道)	August 26, 1998
The attack on Rood begins. Spark's team aim for the city centre whilst the free army simultaneously attack four strongholds around the city, preventing the Marmo army from consolidating. Ashram disobeys the Marmo council and orders Groder to evacuate the wounded onto the ships. Once the city centre is secure, Parn and Deedlit head up to the governor's mansion to face Ashram but only find Pirotess. She is able to delay them long enough for Ashram and the Marmo to escape. He realises that Lodoss will never accept them. As per his duty to look after his people, he leads them out to sea to a safe land once he picks up the others still on Marmo. After Rood has fallen, King Kashue arrives and signs a treaty with Prince Reona uniting all of Lodoss. He then charges Spark to go to Marmo and rescue Neese and prevent Kardis' resurrection. Wagnard begins the ceremony whilst an uneasy Karla decides to ensure the balance of power on Lodoss is maintained.
23	"Landing... The Terrifying Dark Island"; Transliteration: "Jōriku...Osorubeki Ankoku no Shima" (Japanese: 上陸...恐るべき暗黒の島)	September 2, 1998
The group along with Parn, Deedlit, Maar, Hobb and Neese's parents arrive on Marmo and head towards Conquera, where the ceremony will take place. As they travel through the dark forest, the elves sense danger. Karla concludes that the group will disrupt the balance of power on Lodoss and decides to test them to see if they, as representatives of the light, are too strong. Maar and the warriors of the group get separated from the rest and are attacked by mud creatures sent by Karla. They are able to destroy them and return to help the others who are being attacked by gargoyles. Back on Lodoss, the main forces of Flaim, Kanon and Valis set out to Marmo along with Queen Shiris who leads her dragon riders to support them. Unfortunately, Spark's group stumble upon the final test: the awakened dragon Narse.
24	"The Witch... The One Who Maintains the Balance of Power"; Transliteration: "Majo...Chikara no Kinkō o Tamotsumono" (Japanese: 魔女...力の均衡を保つ者)	September 9, 1998
The group are unable to get around Narse as it is too powerful. Maar is about to be killed when Queen Shiris and the dragons riders of Highland appear. They engage the dragon allowing the group to press onwards to Conquera. Ashram prepares to move the Marmo citizens off the island to forge a new kingdom elsewhere away from Lodoss. Karla appears before the group and Spark learns of her nature. Karla offers them a choice: Sacrifice their lives and she will stop the resurrection of Kardis or they can choose to live and she will not stop it. Her reason is that by uniting Lodoss the balance of power is too far into the light and that darkness needs to be restored. Spark angrily refuses and they opt to save Lodoss with their own hands. Just as the dragon riders are about to be defeated Mycen appears and defeats Narse. The group approaches Conquera.
25	"Decision... The Black Knight's Option"; Transliteration: "Kecchaku...Kurokishi no Sentaku" (Japanese: 決着...黒騎士の選択)	September 16, 1998
The resurrection is nearly complete. The group enter Conquera with Leylia using her senses to guide the group but they soon are confronted by Ashram. Parn, Hobb, Deedlit and Maar stay behind whilst an ever-increasingly impatient Spark and the rest continue. Parn and Ashram engage in a swordfight as do Deedlit and Pirotess. Ashram explains his intentions of a safe home for the Marmo people. The reason behind the invasion was to escape their cursed island full of monsters and now Ashram intends to look for a safe place outside of Lodoss. They finish their fight and Ashram and Pirotess leave. Parn tells Hobb to follow his 'true hero' and Maar, looking to finish his ballad, joins him. The others reach a dead end but Garrack finds a secret staircase. At the bottom, they witness the near completion of the ceremony with Kardis having taken over Neese.
26	"Destruction... The Evil God Released"; Transliteration: "Hametsu...Tokihanatareta Jashin" (Japanese: 破滅...解き放たれた邪神)	September 23, 1998
The ceremony is nearly complete: All that is required is to open the Doorway. The warriors attack Wagnard head-on but he casts dangerous spells that can kill in an instant. The magic users go around but are trapped by Karla. Slayn informs that they must remove Karla's circlet without killing her and Greevus warns that they must stop Wagnard from completing the final spell. Spark has calmed down and hatches a plan to use himself as a decoy with Garrack just behind him to deliver the final blow to Wagnard. Garrack charges just before Spark and sacrifices himself as the decoy allowing Spark to run Wagnard through, halting the spell. However Karla was casting the same spell and Parn is just too late in removing the circlet and the spell is finished, completing the resurrection ceremony. Magic spirits are released over Marmo and begin killing every living creature.
27	"Hero... The Birth of a New Knight"; Transliteration: "Eiyū...Aratanaru Kishi no Tanjō" (Japanese: 英雄...新たなる騎士の誕生)	September 30, 1998
The spirits are reaching the Lodoss mainland and begin killing the people there. King Etoh and a band of priests arrive to cast a protective light spell. Spark attempts to reach out to Neese but Kardis blocks him. In the spiritual plane, Naneel is confronted by Neese, her current reincarnation. Neese rejects hers and prays for Marfa to banish her but this only strengthens Kardis. Spark is drawn into the spiritual plane and meets Neese and Naneel. He tells Neese he will never give up on her and he wants her the way she belongs. Neese then accepts Naneel into her and, as the Doorway, this act of benevolence surrounds the evil power and allows Marfa to descend. Marfa gives Spark a choice: Open the doorway allowing Marfa to be reborn and Lodoss can have eternal peace but Neese will be destroyed; or take back Neese and Lodoss will be as it was. He reasons that peace should be achieved by those who live there and opts to take back Neese. Neese is returned, Garrack is revived and a new light shines over Marmo and Leylia collects Karla's circlet. At the celebrations Parn is named the Knight Of Lodoss and King Kashue finally awards Spark his knighthood.
