= List of Master Keaton episodes =

Cover of an English DVD release, featuring Taichi Hiraga-Keaton

Master Keaton is a Japanese anime series, based on the manga series of the same name created by Hokusei Katsushika, Naoki Urasawa, and Takashi Nagasaki. The series was produced by Madhouse, Nippon TV, Shogakukan and VAP and directed by Masayuki Kojima, with Tatsuhiko Urahata handling series composition, Kitarō Kōsaka designing the characters and Kuniaki Haishima composing the music. It was broadcast on Nippon TV between October 6, 1998, and March 30, 1999. Originally consisting of 24 episodes, an additional 15 episodes were created and released as original video animations, bringing the total to 39 episodes. The anime is narrated by Keaton Yamada.

The series follows Taichi Hiraga-Keaton, a freelance insurance investigator who solves cases worldwide, thanks to his archaeological studies at the University of Oxford and his survival and combat training in the Special Air Service. The opening theme "Railtown" is by Kuniaki Haishima. The ending theme for episodes 1–13 is "Eternal Wind" by Blüe, "Tameiki" (ため息; 'A Sigh') by Kneuklid Romance for episodes 14–26, and "From Beginning" by Kuniaki Haishima for episodes 27–39. New ending themes were used for the anime's 2007 rebroadcast; "Tsuki to Kimi to Boku no Kankei" (月と君と僕の関係; 'Connection Between Me, You and the Moon') by Kneuklid Romance for episodes 1–13 and "Eber" by Blüe for episodes 14–24.

The anime and OVAs were licensed in North America by Pioneer Entertainment (later named Geneon), with an English dub produced by The Ocean Group. They released eight DVDs between June 10, 2003, and August 10, 2004.

== Episodes ==
=== TV series (1998–99) ===
No. overall	No. in season	Title	Directed by	Written by	Original air date
1	1	"Man in a Maze"; Transliteration: "Meikyū no Otoko" (Japanese: 迷宮の男)	Shinichi Masaki	Shinzō Fujita	October 6, 1998
A former mercenary soldier named Leon Papas suspiciously falls to his death off a cliff in Isidoros Village. A visiting lecturer named Taichi Hiraga-Keaton learns that he received a call from insurance market Lloyd's of London, and he travels to the Dodecanese in order to investigate Papas's death. Papas had a girlfriend named Sofia, but his beneficiary is a shady art dealer named Ox Bayer. At the cliff, Keaton crosses paths with Bayer before meeting Sofia and introduces himself as an insurance investigator. Sofia takes Keaton to her house, where she recounts that Papas started collecting ancient underwater relics when he returned from the Western Sahara War. However, Papas was exhorted to give up the relics to Bayer. When Papas and Bayer were a part of the Polisario Front, Papas was forced to destroy the Capitoline Temple at Volubilis, where seven men died. Realizing that Bayer is after ancient treasure that Papas had salvaged but never relinquished, Keaton takes Sofia with him in order to escape Bayer's gunfire. After remembering Keaton as his former survival training instructor, Bayer is defeated by Keaton. Sofia reveals that Papas refused to give up the rare coins of Ithaca, which led Bayer to push Papas off the cliff. The coins depict the profile of Ulysses, who took ten years before reaching Ithaca and fell in love with a woman there. Sofia gives one coin to Keaton out of gratitude before he takes his leave.
2	2	"Little Giant"; Transliteration: "Chīsana Kyojin" (Japanese: 小さな巨人)	Masayuki Kojima	Shinzō Fujita	October 13, 1998
Bounty hunters Stuart Pitock, Tonio and Walter stake out terrorist cell in Düsseldorf, targeting Rosa Raine and Frederick Hoffman, two members of the Red Army Faction. When the bounty hunters see Keaton nearby, they invite him at their headquarters. Although Rosa participated in numerous terrorist attacks, Keaton mentions that Rosa wants to surrender despite the large bounty on her head. Later on, the bounty hunters spot Thomas Mueller and Augusto Atcar, two other members of the Red Army Faction, heading to a hideout. As Pitock finds Keaton near the hideout, Keaton knows that Pitock is after Heinz Becker, a world-renowned member of the Red Army Faction who plans to torture Rosa for her betrayal. When Walter is soon captured by Becker, Pitock initiates a rescue operation. Keaton offers his assistance, and a raid is scheduled for the next morning. However, Keaton arrives back in a van and breaks into the second floor of the hideout in order to rescue Rosa and Walter. The bounty hunters infiltrate the hideout, only to find Becker, Mueller and Atcar trapped on the first floor. In the hospital, after Keaton reports to Pitock that Rosa turned herself in, Pitock mentions that Becker, Mueller and Atcar went to the first floor but were caught off guard when Keaton broke into the second floor. Pitock visits Walter in his hospital room and gives him background information about Keaton, who was a former member of the Special Air Service after graduating from the University of Oxford.
3	3	"Strange Tale of Lasagna"; Transliteration: "Razānye Kitan" (Japanese: ラザーニェ奇譚)	Mamoru Kanbe	Tomoko Ogawa	October 20, 1998
A funeral is held for the death of Marco Belnine in Florence. Marco's mother Mrs. Belnine asks Keaton to grant custody of Marco's daughter Flora Belnine from Marco's wife Ann Belnine. Keaton previously went to Marseille and spoke with Ann, who viewed Mrs. Belnine as a horrible woman and hoped to live with Flora. Ann then broke ties with her lover Alan. After Keaton is thrown out by Mrs. Belnine's bodyguard Franco, Keaton is surprised to see Flora inside his car, as they drive away from Franco. Keaton and Flora decide to eat at a restaurant, where Flora recalls when she once danced with Marco. When Keaton and Flora leave the restaurant, they are suddenly chased by Franco, though they manage to escape him by boarding a train in time. Flora learns that Keaton is divorced. At a hotel, Keaton later finds Flora in tears due to a nightmare. Flora fears that Ann will remarry because it has been a year since Marco's death, but Keaton says that Ann will not remarry and is waiting for Flora. The next day, Keaton and Flora travel towards Marseille, but they encounter Mrs. Belnine and Franco on the way. After Keaton defeats Franco, Flora reveals to Mrs. Belnine that she knew that Ann was seeing Alan despite being married to Marco. Flora expresses her admiration for Ann, causing Mrs. Belnine to drive off in disappointment. Before reaching Marseille, Keaton tells Flora a joke about skunks, and they share a dance under the moonlight.
4	4	"Immortal Man"; Transliteration: "Fujimi no Otoko" (Japanese: 不死身の男)	Hiroshi Hara	Hideo Takayashiki	October 27, 1998
In the Świętokrzyskie Mountains, Keaton runs into a man named Andrei Semionov while driving on the road. After picking up Semionov, Keaton learns that Semionov is a teacher for the Russian Mafia, but he owes them 100,000 dollars. Keaton and Semionov escape the Russian Mafia by detonating the car. A blizzard occurs when Keaton and Semionov walk in the snow. After Semionov passes out, Keaton takes him inside an igloo in order to warm themselves up. They discuss that Nicholas II of Russia and his family left a fortune of 500 tons of gold roubles following their execution in Siberia. Although Keaton believes that the gold roubles were transported towards Siberia, Semionov says that they were transported towards England instead. Semionov mentions that Nikita Volkonsky was given a top-secret mission to transport the gold roubles, but he encountered a humpback whale in the Arctic Ocean, assuming it was a U-boat at first. Volkonsky wrecked his ship into an iceberg and sank the treasure. While setting foot to the east in order to avoid the Russian Revolution, his wife died and his son became an orphan in China. The next day, Keaton and Semionov encounter the Russian Mafia from a distance while walking in the snow. Despite Semionov being shot in the chest, he survives due to a diary of Volkonsky that he keeps in his coat pocket, much to Keaton's surprise. As they head to town, it is implied that Semionov is the son of Volkonsky.
5	5	"Paris Under the Roof"; Transliteration: "Yane no Shita no Pari" (Japanese: 屋根の下の巴里)	Shinsaku Sasaki	Hideo Takayashiki	November 3, 1998
At the Simmons Adult Education Center in Paris, Keaton gives a special presentation about European civilizations originating in Egypt. The adult school president informs Keaton that the forty-year-old building will soon be demolished. Moreau, the Minister of Culture, plans to construct a retirement home in its place and preserve a mural. When Keaton returns to his apartment, he is shocked that his daughter Yuriko Hiraga has arrived. While they eat on the rooftop, Keaton expresses his desire to study archaeology, equating it with attics. The next day, Yuriko attends the second special presentation, in which Keaton reveals the possibility of European civilizations originating along the drainage basin of the Danube. The lecture is interrupted by Moreau, who is busy examining the mural. Keaton wants to come back to Japan in order to be near Yuriko and live out his dream as an archaeologist. In the past, Keaton failed his thesis, but Professor Yuri Scott gave Keaton a key to a study room during nighttime, allowing him to research more about the Danube. However, after Scott left the college, Keaton learned that the theory about the Danube came from Scott, who encouraged him to follow his dream. In the present, Keaton concludes with the last special presentation on the following day and even stops Moreau from interrupting. Keaton explains that Scott still lectured at the college during The Blitz. After the building is later demolished, Keaton attends a farewell party at night and reunites with Scott, who appraises his excellent work.
6	6	"White Goddess"; Transliteration: "Shiroi Megami" (Japanese: 白い女神)	Hiroshi Aoyama	Tatsuhiko Urahata	November 10, 1998
At the Isles of Scilly, Keaton meets with Anna Plummer, a colleague and professor, near the Tomb of Queen Guinevere, and it turns out that Plummer is protecting the tomb from being turned into a hairpin turn. Edward Langley, the son of the owner of the tomb, arrives with bulldozers and plans to pave a race track in the area. As Plummer chases Edward away, Edward mentions that the construction will commence the next morning. Keaton and Plummer travel inside the tomb, where Guinevere was a priestess of the druids. While they restore a mural found deep inside the tomb, they are approached by Lady Langley, the mother of Edward. Keaton tells Lady Langley that the ruins were constructed by a different race guided by a religious faith. The mural may hold the key to the holy shrine. Plummer tells Lady Langley that it was her mother's will to prove her theory. It is revealed that Plummer's mother died in a coma after she devoted her life to raise Plummer following the war. With the mural fully restored, Keaton later tells Plummer that they must reenact what Plummer's mother did during the war. The next morning, Keaton and Plummer spill a large bucket of soapy water in order to stop Edward in his tracks. With the bulldozers unable to operate, Lady Langley slaps Edward in the face and tells him to go back home. As Keaton prepares to leave, Plummer compliments Keaton's maturity.
7	7	"Memories of Summer Pudding"; Transliteration: "Harukanaru Samā Pudingu" (Japanese: 遥かなるサマープディング)	Nanako Shimazaki	Hideo Takayashiki	November 17, 1998
In Japan, Keaton and Yuriko meet up with Taihei Hiraga, Keaton's father who studies zoology. Taihei's friend Akemi drops him off at a cottage for summer vacation. At the cottage, Yuriko wants Keaton and Taihei to reconcile with their ex-wives and reunite the family. While Yuriko visits neighbors Mr. Shinjo and Mrs. Shinjo, Keaton and Taihei discuss about Patricia Hiraga, Taihei's ex-wife. Yuriko tells neighbor Mrs. Murata about how both Keaton and Taihei were both divorced by their ex-wives. Keaton and Taihei try to make buckwheat noodles and summer pudding. When Yuriko returns home, it is shown that Taihei realizes that the horseradishes have rotted in the garden while Keaton finds the recipe for summer pudding. When Keaton deduces that the summer pudding was made with pennyroyal mint, he borrows Taihei's dog Taisuke in order to find the field of pennyroyal mint previously planted by Patricia. At night, Keaton and Taihei work together to build a windpump in order to water the field, despite disturbing the neighbors. The next day, after Keaton believes that Patricia returned to Cornwall because of the pennyroyal mint grown there, Yuriko alerts Taihei that he received a phone call from Akemi. Keaton tells Yuriko that Patricia's hometown was filled with the scenic view of pennyroyal mint. Taihei writes a letter informing that he has departed back to Tokyo, taking a box of buckwheat and horseradishes with him. Keaton and Yuriko make summer pudding together, having hauled back a basket full of pennyroyal mint.
8	8	"Negotiator's Rule"; Transliteration: "Kōshō Hito no Rūru" (Japanese: 交渉人のルール)	Mitsuo Hashimoto	Hideo Takayashiki	November 24, 1998
In Cardiff, the plant manager of Yazawa Electronics named Shuji Takita was kidnapped in Sherwood Forest with a ransom of 25 million pounds. Shuji's wife Mrs. Takita reported the incident to Fumio Hisayama, the president of the United Kingdom division of Yazawa Electronics. Superintendent Costner informs Inspector Douglas of the incident. It is revealed that Keaton was sent by Lloyd's of London as a negotiator for the kidnapping. Keaton advises only Mrs. Takita to answer the kidnapper's phone calls in order to guarantee Shuji's safety. After Mrs. Takita learns that Shuji has been strangled in Milford Haven, Hisayama learns that Shuji quit his job on the day before the kidnapping. Mrs. Takita tells Keaton and Shuji's father Kozue Takita that Shuji was busy with his work even to the point of coming home late at night on his birthday. Douglas tells Keaton that an employee named Jack Carol was the lead suspect since he was on bad terms with Shuji. The kidnapper lowers the ransom to ten million pounds, directing Mrs. Takita to a telephone booth containing a photo of Shuji. Keaton shows the photo to Carol, showing the misleading image of Shuji having a severed finger. When the kidnapper agrees to lower the ransom to just under three million pounds, Mrs. Takita takes the ransom to the drop-off location. Mrs. Takita receives a phone call from Shuji at a pay phone, reassuring his safety. Costner and Douglas prepare to find and arrest the kidnapper.
9	9	"Journey With a Lady"; Transliteration: "Kifujin to no Tabi" (Japanese: 貴婦人との旅)	Hiroshi Hara	Tomoko Konparu	December 1, 1998
In a train at Düsseldorf, Keaton meets an arrogant lady. After passing through Cologne, the lady loses her purse containing her ticket, passport and wallet. Keaton offers to pay for her ticket since they are both heading to Basel. The lady gives Keaton an heirloom jewel, but she extorts him into making a stop at Koblenz. Waiting for the next train, the lady claims that her name is Louise von Hohenstaufen, who had a lineage of nobility in Bohemia. Her family became poor during World War II, and her lover Heinrich told her to relocate his private property in West Germany, which resulted in her being pursued by the StB ever since then. With her passport lost and only one stop before reaching Basel, the lady is encouraged by Keaton to sing a folk song in order to avoid the customs officers. Once there, Keaton exploits her for being German and not Swiss. The lady reveals that her real name is Helmina Welf, and her wealthy family from Saxony was barricaded by the Inner German border in West Germany. Her son Otto and her husband Rudolf each disappeared to East Germany but never returned even after ten years. Heinrich told her that Rudolf died and Otto joined the military. The lady gives her ring to Keaton as genuine proof. Upon meeting his business partner Daniel O'Connell in a bar, Keaton learns that the gemstone of the ring originated in Saxony. Keaton eventually realizes that the lady was telling the truth.
10	10	"Charlie"; Transliteration: "Chārī" (Japanese: チャーリー)	Jōji Shimura	Shinzō Fujita	December 8, 1998
A legendary detective named Charlie Chapman arrives at a crime scene and interrogates lead suspect Garner, who claims that he is being framed of murdering an art dealer named Edward Dorfman. Charlie persuades Garner that committing suicide is not the best option, suggesting that he defends himself in court. Soon after, Charlie comes across his childhood friend, who just so happens to be Keaton. Later on, Keaton meets with Charlie at a formal party in his house. Charlie shares details of the murder case with his guests, explaining that Dorfman's wife Janet witnessed Garner holding a gun and the dead body of Dorfman. During his investigation, Charlie learned that Garner was taking bribes from Dorfman, while Dorfman was being very generous to a painter named McBain, who specialized in forgery paintings from notable painters. Dorfman replaced the real paintings with fake ones, while Garner dealt with any entanglements. Charlie concludes that the rifling of Garner's gun matches the marks on Dorfman's body. After Charlie takes Keaton to the evidence room, Keaton speaks with Garner in jail, asking about a greasy piece of leather. Although Charlie believes that the case is closed, Keaton recovers a cartridge that was found near Garner's swimming pool. Keaton theorizes that the real culprit shot a bullet into the swimming pool, then wrapped the piece of leather around the bullet before eventually shooting Dorfman and framing Garner. Thanks to Keaton, Charlie realizes that the real culprit is McBain, who was having an affair with Janet.
11	11	"Special Menu"; Transliteration: "Tokubetsu na Menyū" (Japanese: 特別なメニュー)	Hiroshi Aoyama	Hideo Takayashiki	December 15, 1998
At a restaurant in Chinatown, London called Golden Lotus, a Chinese waitress named Son-Rei serves Keaton and Daniel some shark fin soup as an appetizer. A British kitchen porter named Roddy serves them deep-fried sweet and sour pork on the house from the Chinese head chef named Huk-Shu, who is Son-Rei's father. After the restaurant closes for the night, Huk-Shu fires Roddy for attempting to cook, despite Son-Rei trying to defend Roddy for his passion of learning about Chinese cuisine. Later at the bar, Son-Rei requests Keaton and Daniel to sample Roddy's cooking. Roddy first became obsessed with Chinese cuisine while his father worked as a chef in Hong Kong specializing in French cuisine. Keaton and Daniel agree to convince Huk-Shu in sampling Roddy's cooking and prove Roddy worthy as a chef. Keaton contacts Taihei about the recipe for deep-fried sweet and sour pork. Taihei and Yuriko then take a trip to a restaurant in Yokohama Chinatown called Taishokaku in order to find that recipe. Keaton and Daniel talks with an elderly man named Shou, who mentions that Sun Yat-sen used to work as a chef at Golden Lotus. Yuriko soon contacts Keaton and confirms that the recipe was originally created by Sun. Keaton and Daniel invite Huk-Shu to sample whiskey deep-fried sweet and sour pork and dried persimmon mooncakes served by Son-Rei. After being shocked that Roddy cooked the food from the recipe, Huk-Shu rehires Roddy, while Keaton and Daniel celebrate their success at the bar.
12	12	"A Case for Ladies"; Transliteration: "Gofujin-tachi no Jiken" (Japanese: 御婦人たちの事件)	Nanako Shimazaki	Shinzō Fujita	December 22, 1998
A middle-aged woman named Liddy Wain was found dead in her house, and her nephew Thomas Little is considered the person of interest. At Liddy's house, Keaton meets an elderly woman named Jerry Burnham, who is certain that Thomas is innocent. In Liddy's kitchen, Burnham shows Keaton a pot on the stove, a pie in the oven and a perfume bottle in the cabinet all as evidence, implying that Liddy was involved with a secret lover. Burnham also shows Keaton a bathrobe with the engraved initials "W.G.", found in Liddy's closet. Keaton learns that a man, who usually buys a bouquet of tree lupins, was seen wearing a watch with a family crest. Burnham views a politician on television named Walter Goldman with his wife Doris Goldman, spotting the watch around Walter's wrist. At the coffee shop, Doris attempts to bribe Keaton and Burnham from revealing the political scandal, but Burnham refuses the money. In the park, Walter admits to Keaton and Burnham that he was Liddy's lover, but he only chose to marry Doris in order to start a political career. Keaton and Burnham execute their plan of blackmail at the bridge during the night. When a speeding car approaches them, Keaton throws a nut into the windshield and causes the car to drive off the bridge. Keaton dives into the water and surprisingly finds Doris in the car. While Doris confesses the murder to the police, Burnham tells Keaton that both Doris and Liddy wore the same perfume.
13	13	"A Peaceful Death"; Transliteration: "Odayaka na Shi" (Japanese: 穏やかな死)	Masayuki Kojima	Tatsuhiko Urahata	January 5, 1998
Richard Connelly, a bomb expert in the Irish Republican Army, creates a bomb inside a bag for terrorist Gerald Donavan to be concealed and detonated in the Benson & Son's shopping center. Connelly speaks with an old man at a bus stop, which brings up a memory when his late grandfather gave him a chocolate bar. After attending his grandfather's funeral at a church, Connelly encounters Keaton outside a pastry shop and takes him to a hotel. Confirming that two bombs were defused by Keaton in the past, Connelly enlists Keaton to locate and defuse the bomb concealed in the shopping center. Keaton and Connelly head to the basement of the shopping center, where Donavan's bomb is planted, and Connelly is able to defuse the bomb since it has a shaped charge. They eventually realize that Connelly's bomb is hiding in the middle of the top floor of the shopping center. Connelly intercepts a boy from touching the bomb found under a bench and gives him a chocolate bar, but Connelly ends up wounded from landing on the ground. Since the bomb can be triggered by vibrations, Keaton carefully opens the bag and injects a solidifying liquid which coagulates after ten minutes. After unscrewing the box, Connelly is shocked that the copper inside is already melting. Keaton rushes to purchase two chocolate bars, using them to defuse the bomb in time. Connelly returns to the funeral and places a chocolate bar inside his grandfather's coffin.
14	14	"Wall in One's Heart"; Transliteration: "Kokoro no Kabe" (Japanese: 心の壁)	Hiroshi Hara	Hideo Takayashiki	January 12, 1999
Keaton is tasked by Shreider to help find his former wife Louise, who was left behind in East Germany when she was pregnant eighteen years ago. In Dresden, Kohl confirms that Louise gave birth to her daughter named Rosa, who became fond of a music box played by Louise, but Rosa disappeared after Louise was among the casualties in a concentration camp. Keaton learns that Shreider was a military computer developer in an underground operation. A pregnant Louise stayed behind and allowed Shreider and his assistant Teresa to cross the border into West Germany. Gotrope, the driver for a commandant named Klause, gives Keaton and Shreider an envelope with a list of adopted children from the concentration camp. Outside a house for sale, a brunette lady informs them that Rosa caused a scandal five years ago, running away from the house after gravely injuring her adoptive father Molitz. At night in a bar, a blonde woman, owning the music box since six months ago, tells them that Rosa sought revenge against her biological father for being abandoned. Based on a photograph, Keaton and Shreider shockingly discover that Rosa is actually Hanna, the babysitter of Teresa's daughter Clara. A flashback shows that Rosa choked Molitz with his necktie after almost being molested by him. Before Shreider and Keaton arrive, Rosa is caught off guard when Clara sings the tune of the music box, tearfully realizing that Shreider was the one who gave the music box to Louise all those years ago.
15	15	"Long Hot Day"; Transliteration: "Nagaku Atsui Hi" (Japanese: 長く暑い日)	Kō Matsuo	Tatsuhiko Urahata	January 19, 1999
Keaton tracks down Michael Robert, a man living in the Cazarus Mountain Lodge who owes back a settlement from the insurance consortium for a false claim. Michael secretly releases his dog Johnny to attack Keaton's taxi driver, who was waiting in the shade. Keaton hitchhikes to a bar, where Johnny follows. The bartender suggests Keaton to walk to Burguete in order to take a bus heading to Pamplona. Keaton is eventually attacked by Johnny in the woods, and Keaton tries to escape Johnny at a stream. Luckily, a man named Hunter fires a bullet in the sky in order to scare Johnny away. Inside Hunter's cabin, Keaton sees Johnny waiting outside. Keaton soon finds out that Johnny is a military dog sent by Michael, who received an insurance check worth 1.5 million dollars by faking a suicide. Michael was with the special forces in the Vietnam War, and he studied veterinary medicine at the University of Massachusetts Amherst, concluding that he was an attack dog trainer. Johnny creates a diversion and leads Hunter to his pigpen, where Johnny suddenly jumps off the roof and attacks Hunter. However, Keaton throws a rock at Johnny, causing Johnny to retreat while holding Hunter's rifle in its mouth. Before sundown, Keaton lures Johnny from the pigpen to the cabin, then leads Johnny to the stream. Keaton manages to trap Johnny underwater before it tries to bite him. Michael is arrested afterwards, shocked to see Keaton still alive and Johnny in a cage.
16	16	"The Elm Tree Forever"; Transliteration: "Eien no Nire no Ki" (Japanese: 永遠の楡の木)	Hiroshi Aoyama	Tomoko Konparu	January 26, 1999
Keaton meets a piano composer named Robert Fenders, whose father Lord Fenders has declared bankruptcy from his business two years ago. Lord Fenders was forced to sell all of his property and possessions in order to pay out an insurance claim. Robert is glad about this because he was kicked out of the mansion ten years ago due to his ambitions. Lord Fenders frequently visits the site of the mansion, where he once burned Robert's piano composition near an age-old elm. In a bar, Robert tells Keaton that Lord Fenders always watches the elm, which was struck by lightning prior to losing his business. Robert further explains that his motivation as a piano composer came from his hatred for Lord Fenders's arrogance and pompousness. However, Robert has now lost his passion as a piano composer since Lord Fenders has become more reserved. Lord Fenders later declines a business proposition from Mr. Greenpark, who then confirms to Keaton and Robert that Lord Fenders has changed. Keaton encourages Robert to restore the elm back to its former glory. Keaton and Greenpark invite Lord Fenders to a restaurant, where Robert plays a performance on stage. Lord Fenders, becoming nostalgic of the tune, returns to the mansion and looks at the elm. Once Keaton and Robert arrive, Lord Fenders shows them that the elm is growing new buds in the ground as a sign of renewal. Lord Fenders plans to accept Greenpark's business proposition, leaving Robert with encouraging words to continue his ambitions.
17	17	"A Mansion of Roses"; Transliteration: "Bara no Yakata" (Japanese: バラの館)	Toshiharu Sato	Shinzō Fujita	February 9, 1999
During a funeral held for a businessman named Edmund Lyman, Charlie prevents Keaton from talking to Edmund's widow Flora Lyman, who hired Charlie as her bodyguard. Daniel tells Keaton that Edmund was found murdered in his rose garden, and Edmund's gardener Eric Lyndon is the prime suspect but has disappeared. Charlie and Flora survive a car accident into a tree after the brake fluid was mysteriously emptied. While Charlie watches Flora tend to the rose garden, Keaton gathers evidence of the murder. Charlie soon discovers that Flora's dog was poisoned from drinking milk. Keaton finds Flora tending to an unnamed rose species, noticing a plot recently dug up. As they eat cherry pie, Keaton informs Charlie that Edmund was murdered near the Sterling Silver roses, the variety with the fewest thorns, but Edmund's autopsy displayed numerous abrasions on his face. Keaton later finds the poisonous chemicals and Eric's bloodstains on the wall inside Edmund's garden shed. Keaton deduces that Eric was also murdered, theorizing that Flora is the real culprit. As Keaton pieces together the evidence that all point to Flora, she admits that she killed Edmund after her affair with Eric. However, she refused to turn herself in to the police and killed Eric, having buried his body in the plot. Keaton reveals that Eric was going to register the unnamed rose species as the Graceful Flora roses. Flora is consequently arrested, and Charlie leaves a rose on the police car before sadly walking away with Keaton.
18	18	"Miscalculation of a Faker"; Transliteration: "Feikā no Gosan" (Japanese: フェイカーの誤算)	Fumihiro Yoshimura	Hideo Takayashiki	February 16, 1999
The frail Professor Benington accidentally crashes his car into Travis. After learning from Galade that Travis's right leg and arm are supposedly paralyzed, Benington vows to repay his debt to Travis. However, Travis and Galade secretly are con men who staged the car accident, hoping to swindle Benington. At Lambeth College, Benington talks to Keaton about his candidacy for chancellor against the son-in-law of the current Chancellor, the snarky Professor William Stephane, who plans to sell off the grounds and move the school to the suburbs. Galade later tells Keaton and Benington that Travis's atlas is supposedly fractured. Fellow con man Webb informs Travis and Galade that Benington took out an expensive second mortgage. Keaton becomes suspicious when he accidentally spills hot tea on Travis's right hand. All three con men eventually realize that Benington should win the election against Stephane. Benington is surprised that he will be endorsed by the Chancellor, who had received an anonymous letter from Webb containing accusations of improper conduct. The Chancellor coincidentally is hospitalized after suffering a heart attack. Keaton finds an unusual pill behind a potted plant, and Benington accuses Stephane of switching the Chancellor's heart medication. The con men stage a publicly seen hit and run against Stephane, who then crashes his car into a lamppost. Keaton visits a genuinely injured Travis at the hospital, where Travis admits to being a con man. Benington is elected as the new chancellor and the school is saved.
19	19	"Into the Vast Sky..."; Transliteration: "Sora E..." (Japanese: 空へ...)	Satoshi Kuwabara	Tsutomu Kaneko	February 23, 1999
At the train station, Yuriko bumps into her childhood friend named Shinsuke Funase, who has smuggled a hawk inside his backpack. Shinsuke's mother tells Keaton about Shinsuke's suicide note, while Shinsuke's father shows Keaton an empty birdcage. Meanwhile, Yuriko and Shinsuke take a bus to Musashi Province. In the mountains, Shinsuke tells Yuriko that he desires to finally free the hawk after it has been confined inside the birdcage. While driving, Keaton learns from Shinsuke's father that Shinsuke attempted to free the hawk a month ago, but the hawk bruised Shinsuke's father on his face after he tried to restrain Shinsuke. Keaton reassures Shinsuke's father that Yuriko and Shinsuke are okay in the mountains. After Yuriko expresses her undecided career path, Shinsuke fears that he is unable to live up to the expectations of pursuing a career as a doctor since his grades are slipping. Yuriko and Shinsuke steal two tomatoes from a crop and eat them after venturing deeper into the mountains. Keaton and Shinsuke's father soon find the crop and follow the trail. While Shinsuke's father realizes that Shinsuke was comparing himself to the hawk, Keaton perceives that Shinsuke will find a sky where he belongs. At a waterfall, Yuriko and Shinsuke witness the hawk refusing to fly away. Upon their arrival at the waterfall, Keaton says that the hawk needs time to survive in the wild, while Shinsuke's father agrees to help Shinsuke teach the hawk some survival skills in the mountains.
20	20	"The Island of the Cowards"; Transliteration: "Okubyōmono no Shima" (Japanese: 臆病者の島)	Nanako Shimazaki	Shinzō Fujita	March 2, 1999
In Cara Island, Keaton and Eric Graves, whose late father was a hotel manager, are soon served some tea by waiter Jonathan. Eric dreams of being a soldier in the Special Air Service. After Keaton and Eric witness alcoholic Mr. Foster harassing waitress Helen, gunshots are heard nearby. Keaton and Eric find an unknown man dead and Detective Rupert heavily wounded at the quay. When they carry Rupert back to the lobby of the hotel, they are surrounded by an armed Polish mafia, whose members are Mr. Herman, Otto and Karol. Having to wait six hours until the sandbar reappears from the tides, the Polish mafia force Keaton, Eric, Rupert, Foster, Jonathan and Helen to a second floor hotel room. Rupert reveals that he intervened when Oscar Neal, a researcher for Lessing Pharmaceuticals, gave the Polish mafia a stolen floppy disk containing a secret asthma cure, but Oscar was shot dead by the Polish mafia, who plan to manufacture and distribute the asthma cure. The Polish mafia take Keaton to the boathouse in order to repair a wrecked boat, while the others stay behind in the hotel room. Using Eric as bait in order to reach the lobby, Foster attempts to shoot the Polish mafia with a revolver, but Herman subdues him. Foster, revealed to be a former colonel, stalls Herman until Keaton smashes through the window and apprehends Herman. With Foster and Rupert still recovering, Keaton hears from Eric about how Foster was a "brave coward".
21	21	"The Thistle Emblem"; Transliteration: "Azami no Monshō" (Japanese: アザミの紋章)	Shinsaku Sasaki	Tomoko Konparu	March 9, 1999
In Edinburgh, Taihei brings a bottle of sake to Keaton inside a bar. After ordering a bottle of Scotch whisky, Keaton explains to Taihei that he is waiting for Professor Amada to show up so they can compare the two bottles. Keaton shows Taihei a Scottish antique watch engraved with a coat of arms and stored in a box, which was previously preserved in a Japanese shrine. Tasked to find the original owner of the watch, Keaton points out to Taihei that the box and the coat of arms both feature a thistle. Keaton previously went to the National Archives of Scotland and learned that the coat of arms might have come from Strathspey. He surprisingly found out that the bottle of Scotch whisky features the same coat of arms. Upon discovering the history of Angus T. Charmichael, known as the Lord of Scotch, Keaton did some investigating. Keaton tells Taihei about the tragic life of Angus during the Reformation, detailing his orphanage in a monastery, his grievance over the death of his lover Ann Macrae and his shipwreck at sea with his servant Fiddich. Moreover, Keaton tells the legend of a tengu from the sea being forbidden to fall in love with a merchant's daughter by an entire village. Taihei realizes that the bottle of sake also features a thistle, but Keaton notices a slight difference with the coat of arms. Amada finally shows up, and it is implied that he is a descendant of Angus.
22	22	"Chateau Lajonchee 1944"; Transliteration: "Shatō Rajonshu 1944" (Japanese: シャトー・ラジョンシュ1944)	Kitarō Kōsaka	Tomoko Konparu	March 16, 1999
In Burgundy, Victor Chanbonne was mentored by his servant Libero in winemaking since childhood, including a vintage wine called Chateau Lajonchee 1944. Victor's wife and château owner Marguerite says that Libero is opposed to expanding the winery since part of the vineyard would be pulled out. Victor and Marguerite each tell Libero that he needs to modernize his outdated tradition in winemaking. Meanwhile, Keaton learns the origin of Chateau Lajonchee 1944, though the château owner plans to pay off debt by selling the last bottle of Chateau Lajonchee 1944 ever made for 10 million francs to a whisky company called Horizon. While visiting the château, Keaton tours the winery. Marguerite plans to replace the oak barrels with stainless steel and the wooden tanks with plastic in order to improve the process of fermentation. Victor and Libero then show Keaton the bottle of Chateau Lajonchee 1944. After Marguerite has an investment meeting with Horizon, Victor tells Keaton that Libero protected him from being spotted in a haystack by the Germans during World War II. During a dinner party, Victor drops the bottle of Chateau Lajonchee 1944 into pieces before preparing to give it to Jan Michel Queff, the chief executive officer of Horizon. The next day, as Keaton learns that Marguerite never visited the vineyard ever since her parents died, Libero previously switched the bottle with another vintage wine after anticipating that Victor would purposely drop it. Both Victor and Marguerite taste one last wineglass of Chateau Lajonchee 1944.
23	23	"No Way Out"; Transliteration: "Deguchi Nashi" (Japanese: 出口なし)	Toshiharu Sato	Shinzō Fujita	March 23, 1999
In the Lake District, Keaton captures criminal Bruce Kendall at a petrol station. Because Keaton's life is in danger, he plans to walk along the side road that leads to Coniston Water in order to hand Bruce over to the policemen on standby there. While a disillusioned supporter of Bruce named Andy locates and shoots two policemen on standby, Keaton deals with three other supporters of Bruce at the petrol station and confiscates their shotgun. The bog and marsh surrounding the side road act like quicksand. Bruce murdered the leader of a labor union and robbed banks and shops as a protest to a coal mining and quarrying company called the Morcom Group, but the corporation's accountant testified at the hearing that Bruce worked for the Morcom Group and that the robberies helped the company to obtain insurance payments. Keaton and Bruce arrive in a pub, where another supporter of Bruce named Jack hesitates to shoot Keaton when Bruce restrains Keaton. When Bruce takes the shotgun and points it at Keaton, the latter removes the bullet before the former pulls the trigger. Although Bruce bends the shotgun, Keaton prevents Bruce from escaping. Andy appears disguised as a policeman at the end of the side road, soon forcing Keaton and Bruce to walk into the bog and marsh. However, Keaton fires a bullet from the bent shotgun, wounding Andy and causing Bruce to surrender. Keaton and Bruce carry Andy as they walk on the side road heading to a hospital.
24	24	"The Day the Op Was Born"; Transliteration: "Opu no Umareta Hi" (Japanese: オプの生まれた日)	Hiroshi Aoyama	Tatsuhiko Urahata	March 30, 1999
Ten years ago in White Wells, Daniel approaches archaeological site supervisor Davis in order to write up a report concerning assistant archaeology professor Stuart Atkins, who died from a falling accident in the lake on the previous week. Keaton works part-time at the archaeological site, having dug up a man's brooch of Celtic origin. Professor Stevens and Professor Powell present Keaton and Daniel with the clothes worn by Atkins before his death. Daniel found a chip from a wine flagon in the front breast pocket of Atkins's shirt, and Keaton speculates that Atkins may have been attacked, leading Daniel to conclude that Atkins was struck on the forehead before his death. Powell tells Daniel that Davis and Atkins disagreed over the adequacy of the workers' wages. Davis confesses to Daniel that he drank wine with Atkins after their disagreement. At night, Keaton informs Daniel that the chip from the wine flagon still has a faint smell of fresh wine. The next day, Keaton and Daniel shockingly find another chip from the wine flagon hidden behind a porcelain plate inside Powell's office. Holding Keaton and Daniel at gunpoint, Powell explains that he was forced to strike Atkins with the wine flagon after an envious Atkins nearly choked a frightened Powell, who wanted to celebrate being engaged to Stevens's daughter Dolly. Keaton quickly apprehends Powell before the latter pulls the trigger. Following Powell's arrest, Daniel offers Keaton to be his business partner.

=== OVA (1999–2000) ===
No. overall	No. in season	Title	Directed by	Written by	Original release date
25	1	"Kalihman of the Desert"; Transliteration: "Sabaku no Kāriman" (Japanese: 砂漠のカーリマン)	Hiroshi Hara	Tomoko Konparu	June 21, 1999
In the Xinjiang Uygur Autonomous Region, Taichi Hiraga-Keaton visits an archaeological site at the Taklamakan Desert led by Professor Takakura. While touring the archaeological site with Assistant Professor Yamamoto, Keaton momentarily meets Karim Muhammad, the Sheikh of the Uyghurs who allowed the excavation to be possible, as well as Abdullah Abbas, Muhammad's problem son who despises outsiders setting foot on the land. Professor Collins and Mr. Harney disagree with Takakura wanting to excavate an ancient wall, in which Keaton and Yamamoto soon learn from Muhammad that it is a sacred monument of the legendary hero Sadiq. Muhammad soon dies after overwhelmingly witnessing the monument being excavated on Takakura's orders despite Keaton's plea. Seeking revenge for his father's death, Abbas leaves Keaton, Takakura, Yamamoto, Collins and Harney in the middle of the desert. Keaton puts his survival skills to the test, digging a hole in a dune in order to provide shade, setting up a trap in order to catch a desert rat for food and creating a latrine using six waterproof bags in order to gather clean water. While leading them to safety, Keaton guarantees the others that Abbas will not pursue them if they make it out of the desert alive, according to the story of Sadiq. After four days in the desert within two miles towards the southern road, Abbas is surprised to see Keaton still living. Abbas orders his men to give Keaton some water, honoring him as a legendary hero.
26	2	"Family"; Transliteration: "Kazoku" (Japanese: 家族)	Toshiharu Sato	Hideo Takayashiki	July 23, 1999
In Leipzig, Karl Neumann, a former Olympic swimmer, shares an abandoned building with a hospitable group of refugees from Yugoslavia. Neumann lets go of his past by giving his gold medal to a boy named Eliah, whom he later protects by standing up to three bullying nationalist skinheads. Passing by the building, Keaton shares his sake with the refugees while they eat grilled sausages. However, the skinheads return and try to force the refugees out of the building. As Neumann and Eliah show up outside the building, the skinheads realize that Neumann broke a world record by doping. Keaton and the refugees throw icicles at the skinheads, chasing them away. With his heart in critical condition, Neumann reveals to Keaton that he used performance-enhancing drugs during the swimming competition at the 1988 Summer Olympics just to beat his rival Thomas Wenner. Keaton admits that he was hired by Wenner in order to find Neumann, who confirms that he is suffering from muscle fatigue. When Keaton later brings Wenner to the building, it is shown that Neumann already left the building while Eliah followed him. Eliah accidentally drops the gold medal into the riverbank and falls into the river below, prompting Neumann to dive in and rescue Eliah back to the riverbank. Neumann drowns in the river, only to wake up surrounded by the refugees. Keaton mentions that Wenner saved Neumann from drowning. Neumann decides to stay with the refugees and build a snowman with Eliah.
27	3	"The Red Wind"; Transliteration: "Akai Kaze" (Japanese: 赤い風)	Kō Matsuo	Seishi Minakami	August 21, 1999
Three boys named Stefan Razin, Mikhail and Nikolai made a childhood pact to become fine upstanding gentlemen. In the present, Stefan works as an economics reformer from Moscow. Keaton learns about the death of Stefan's first bodyguard Dmitri Donskoi, determining that Donskoi was pierced with a twig through his medulla oblongata. After Keaton is introduced to Stefan's second bodyguard Vladimir Kovalenko, Stefan invites Keaton to attend an upcoming air show in Corringham. Stefan soon finds out that Kovalenko was strangled to death with his necktie hung from a doorknob. Because of this, Stefan enlists Keaton to protect him from a potential assassin. Keaton encounters his former commanding officer Captain West, who believes that an operative of the KGB nicknamed Red Wind is responsible for murdering the two bodyguards by using available objects. Stefan faints after realizing his handkerchief quotes the pact that he made with his comrades. In a hotel, Keaton later learns that Stefan, Mikhail and Nikolai each wrote love letters to their teacher Natalya Raskolnikov, who inspired them to make the pact. Keaton soon deduces that Mikhail is actually Red Wind and that Stefan betrayed the pact by becoming an economics reformer. At night, Keaton is captured by Mikhail, who accuses Stefan of killing Nikolai in the past. Keaton frees himself and attempts to help Stefan escape from Mikhail, but to no avail. At the stairwell, Stefan and Mikhail end up killing each other, since they both technically had betrayed their pact with Nikolai.
28	4	"A Message from Alexeyev"; Transliteration: "Arekuseiefu Kara no Dengon" (Japanese: アレクセイエフからの伝言)	Masayuki Kojima	Daisuke Aranishi	September 22, 1999
On a stormy day at a resort in Formentera, Sendel takes his briefcase and walks to the beach. As the rain clears up, Sendel handcuffs himself to the briefcase and chucks the key into the sea. Keaton finds an ornamental seashell at the beach, concluding that oriental agriculture reached Formentera about 7,000 years ago. Sendel tells Keaton about a nearby mansion belonging to Velasco, whose mistress makes an appearance at the resort. Noticing that Keaton is both perceptive and whimsical, Sendel tasks Keaton to discreetly observe Velasco at a restaurant. After Velasco leaves, Keaton deduces that Velasco is unhappy with his fortunate lifestyle. Sendel explains how he was involved in the Spanish Civil War fifty years ago, when he fought alongside Tomski and Alexeyev, who were two Russian spies. During a display of fireworks celebrating their victory, the three of them became good friends. However, they eventually parted ways after they passionately but secretly betrayed each other. It is revealed that Tomski is in fact Velasco, while Alexeyev was a fugitive for forty years. Sendel received the briefcase from Alexeyev containing a message to keep his pocket watch if he does not return. Although the briefcase actually contains a bomb, Sendel has a change of heart, thanks to Keaton's positive outlook on life. Keaton unlocks Sendel's handcuffs using tweezers, taking the briefcase to the beach and letting the bomb safely detonate. Remembering the display of fireworks, Sendel finally has closure to pardon his past.
29	5	"The Forbidden Fruit"; Transliteration: "Kindan no Mi" (Japanese: 禁断の実)	Yasuhiro Matsumura	Tomoko Ogawa	October 21, 1999
When Keaton has a faulty carburetor, James Kelling picks up Keaton, who is nurturing a sparrow back to health. James takes Keaton to the Arthur Malthus country estate, a premiere accounting firm which is located on a ridge overlooking Blackdown. Fellow board members Eugene Hart, Harold Smith, Pat Campbell and Oscar Hammer are introduced. While waiting for Frank Miller, who is engaged to Eugene's daughter Janet Hart, Keaton is reluctant to find out that his car will not be repaired until the next day, meaning that he will spend the night with the board members. When Frank and Janet finally arrive, the board members have a toast celebrating Frank as the newest and youngest board member. It is revealed that James offered a proposal ten years ago to set up a holding company in Brunei, which would be tax exempt from Malaysia, Hong Kong and the United Kingdom. When Keaton brings up the suspicious deaths of three former board members, he mentions that they were poisoned by a plant called monkshood. After Russian tea is served, Keaton reveals his true motive of investigating the deaths and prevents everyone from drinking their Russian tea. He suspects James as the culprit, seeing as the three former board members were poisoned before their promotions. James drinks Frank's Russian tea, and he recalls that he poisoned his own brother during childhood. In order to avoid being arrested, James runs out the window and falls to his death into the ridge below.
30	6	"The Highlands in Your Eyes"; Transliteration: "Hitomi no Naka no Hairando" (Japanese: 瞳の中のハイランド)	Shinsaku Sasaki	Toshiki Inoue	November 21, 1999
At a building in Finchingfield, Keaton attempts to rescue elderly artist Douglas, who has extreme myopia. Unfortunately, bodyguard Morris forces Douglas to forge a painting by Edgar Degas for art dealer Clifford Ferris. Keaton is captured by Morris, who injures Keaton's shin with a paddle before leaving. Keaton uses Douglas's easel to create an impromptu splint. Although Douglas has little interest in escaping, he secretly has sketched the scenery of the Scottish Highlands. Douglas developed myopia as a boy due to his love for drawing, but he eventually forged paintings for work as a man after his sketches did not bring him much income. He felt confident after forging a painting by Vincent van Gogh, but he began having recurring nightmares of walking aimlessly in a strange forest as a boy. However, he later had a dream that he found a mountain path outside the forest, resulting in his sketch of the Scottish Highlands. Explaining that humans have a passion for taking what is seen and expressing it in their own style, Keaton fills up a light bulb with charcoal and oil thinner and stuffs it inside a bust, fooling Morris into an explosion when he arrives. Keaton and Douglas try to escape with the sketch, but Clifford shoots at them. Clifford impales Douglas with his rifle, and Douglas's eyesight is miraculously restored, only for Clifford to destroy the sketch. Keaton and Douglas work together to knock out Clifford before they drive off from the burning building.
31	7	"The Scent Is the Key"; Transliteration: "Nioi no Kagi" (Japanese: 匂いの鍵)	Hiroshi Hara	Shinzō Fujita	December 22, 1999
In Dresden, Heinen tasks Keaton to investigate the untimely death of his friend Seidel. Mrs. Wagner, a neighbor who has a hobby for potpourri, mentions that Seidel had a characteristic scent when he collapsed. Ascott, a painter who lives across the street, says that he witnessed Seidel walking inside the front entrance of the apartment building. A congested doctor informs that Seidel was a war veteran with a burn mark. Heinen soon reveals that Seidel lacked the scent of death. Ascott remembers that Seidel was secretly watched by a man holding an umbrella near the front entrance of the apartment building. The doctor confirms that Seidel's burn mark was on the inner surface of his right arm. Wagner recalls that Seidel had a distinct scent of peaches when he died. While taking his dog Kurt for a walk, Heinen comes across the man, concealing a gas gun under the umbrella that contains potassium cyanide with an aroma of peaches. Kurt inhales the fumes and dies. After Keaton chases away the man, recognized as Johan Kurten, it is revealed that Heinen and Seidel were informants for the government of East Germany, while Kurten was their supervisor working for the Stasi. Mentioning that Seidel's burn mark covered a tattoo of the Schutzstaffel symbol, Heinen admits that he was blackmailed and manipulated by the government. Kurten tried to cover his tracks after the war relieved Heinen and Seidel of being informants. Heinen carries Kurt in his arms, lamenting that he lost two friends.
32	8	"The Back Street"; Transliteration: "Senaka no Ura Machi" (Japanese: 背中の裏街)	Nanako Shimazaki	Tomoko Konparu	January 21, 2000
Keaton visits Taihei Hiraga at the cottage, where his friend Naomi is staying for a while. After tracking down display window designer Kayoko Kida, who believes that Taihei is her biological father, Keaton is taken to her apartment. When she was six years old, she frequently followed Taihei to his former apartment in the slums and saw him on the second floor. Keaton leaves the apartment after returning money that Kayoko gave to Taihei, but he quickly comes back, finding her passed out from drug overdose. When she recovers, she says that her mother advised her that all men who are always kind at first end up using and hurting women. After recalling that Taihei called her dog cute when she was six years old, Kayoko reveals that her mother committed suicide after Taihei disappeared. Kayoko was sent to an orphanage and received a scholarship, making up her mind to learn a skill and live on her own merit. However, she fell in love with her business partner Usami, who left her after stealing her registered seal and computer discs containing her database. Arriving at Usami's apartment, Keaton breaks in and uses Taisuke to sniff Kayoko's handkerchief, soon locating the computer discs behind Usami's bed. Kayoko drops off Keaton, hoping to see him again. At the cottage, Keaton confirms that Taihei lived on the third floor of the apartment in the slums. The man living on the second floor was actually a pimp, who was stabbed to death by Kayoko's mother.
33	9	"Devil Like an Angel"; Transliteration: "Tenshi no Yōna Akuma" (Japanese: 天使のような悪魔)	Susumu Ishizaki	Daisuke Aranishi	February 21, 2000
In Florence, Keaton searches for Hiroshi Matsui, a Japanese exchange student studying at the Masaccio Art Institute of Higher Learning, in order for him to sign his deceased mother's will as the beneficiary. With Matsui's sudden disappearance, Keaton is told to look for a man named Pietro Moralli. At Moralli's apartment, Keaton learns that Moralli offered to hide Matsui there due to being involved in a political movement, but Matsui has gone missing. Keaton secretly takes a painting knife left at the apartment. He eventually encounters two detectives, who believe that Matsui is involved with a man named Francesco Meda, a terrorist from the Red Brigades. Moralli follows Keaton to the ruins of Serravalle Duomo on the outskirts of Florence, where Moralli attempts to stab Keaton with a cinquedea. Meanwhile, the detectives learn that Moralli and Meda are the same person, in which he is targeting Matsui for the insurance claim. Keaton defends with the painting knife, but he is unexpectedly knocked out by Matsui. Meda urges Matsui to sign the will worth 400 million lira over to him. With Keaton trapped inside the ruins, he uses his survival skills to escape. When Matsui refuses to sign the will over to Meda, Keaton arrives in time and defeats Meda in combat. The next day, after Meda is arrested, Matsui tells Keaton that his mother supported his ambition for painting. However, Matsui was unable to finish a painting of the ruins as a gift to his mother.
34	10	"The Agate Color of Time"; Transliteration: "Menō-iro no Jikan" (Japanese: 瑪瑙色の時間)	Masayuki Kojima; Masaaki Kumatani	Yoshiaki Kawajiri	March 23, 2000
While traveling by train through Cornwall, Keaton tell Yuriko tells the story of his childhood. At St Ives in 1967, Keaton was told by bus driver Christopher "Chris" Watkins that he will be a "master of life". At a pier, Keaton had a scuffle with three boys named Dean, Ralph and Phil, who were jealous that Keaton stayed at his grandmother's summer house. Chris once told a married couple as well as a smoker named John to leave the bus for disruptive behavior. After telling Keaton that the poor locals customarily resent the wealthy outsiders every summer, Chris took him to a special spot at Land's End, where the sea sparkled red. Keaton was soon invited by Dean, Ralph and Phil to cross Bodmin Moor. Chris parted ways with Keaton after lamenting his miserable life. Keaton, Dean, Ralph and Phil cross Bodmin Moor, despite the fact that Dean threw out Keaton's water canteen. Luckily, Keaton dug up water inside an ancient tomb, but the four of them were forced to stay there all night. The next morning, the mothers of Dean, Ralph and Phil were relieved for their safety. However, Dean accused Keaton of coercing him to cross Bodmin Moor. Chris arrived to vouch for Keaton and take him home. Chris took Keaton back to Land's End, where the sea sparkled green. In the present, Keaton reveals to Yuriko that Chris, the father of Dean, remarried his ex-wife Carol. Keaton still remembers the unforgettable color of the sea.
35	11	"Love in May"; Transliteration: "Gogatsu no Koi" (Japanese: 五月の恋)	Kitarō Kōsaka	Tomoko Konparu	April 21, 2000
During her Golden Week vacation, Yuriko leaves Daniel O'Connell to look after Keaton, who is in the hospital with a broken left leg. In Piccadilly Circus, Yuriko encounters an elderly Japanese woman named Sachiko Shiatori, whose handbag was snatched by a luggage thief. Unfortunately, the handbag contained a gift for a long-lost friend of Sachiko. Identifying the luggage thief as Olaf Helmer, a detective in the Scotland Yard says that there needs to be concrete evidence before making a move. Yuriko learns that it has been fifty years since Sachiko saw her lost-long friend, revealed as a British university entomology professor from Marlow named Paul Wilkins, who first met Sachiko after fainting in the street behind her family's wholesale textile business and stayed a week in her guest house to recover while thinking about the koinobori on display. Yuriko and Sachiko encounter and follow Helmer to a harbor shed, working together to defeat him and get back the handbag. While traveling by train to Marlow, Sachiko explains that Paul wrote several letters to her before and after the war, but her father thought Paul was a spy and disposed of the letters. They are unable to find Paul once reaching Marlow, but Yuriko decides to hang the gift, revealed as a carp streamer, on a clock tower. Gladly, Sachiko is fetched to reunite with Paul, who saw the carp streamer from his hospital window. Sachiko tells Yuriko that she has decided to live in Marlow and stay with Paul.
36	12	"Blue Friday"; Transliteration: "Burū Furaidē" (Japanese: ブルーフライデー)	Hiroshi Hara	Tomoko Konparu	May 24, 2000
Keaton reports to Daniel about an elusive insurance beneficiary named Edgar Fisher, who was an illegitimate child of the deceased Mr. Reed. At a bar, Daniel introduces Keaton to his beautiful date named Louise Brown, a secretary for her uncle's precious metals firm. During his investigation to find Edgar, Keaton learns that Edgar used to play the bass in the indie rock band Fires under the name Ted Thunderstorm. When Keaton goes to Edgar's apartment, Edgar sneaks up and knocks out Keaton with a beer bottle before running away. The next day, Keaton finds out that Edgar was fired from a music store due to storming off after receiving an anonymous phone call. As Keaton suspects that someone is secretly contacting Edgar in order to avoid him, Keaton finds and subdues Edgar in an alleyway, only to learn that Edgar has been repeatedly warned about the cops from receiving random phone calls. Before Louise tries to meet Daniel inside the bar, Keaton stands in her way. Louise admits that she was assigned to intervene somehow so that Edgar would not split the insurance money and estate with Reed's three legitimate sons. She used Daniel by getting information about Keaton's plans and anonymously tipped off Edgar so Keaton would not meet him. Although it was a job for her, she enjoyed being around Daniel despite having an incarcerated husband. Keaton goes to the bar and hangs out with Daniel, while an ashamed Louise rides off in a bus.
37	13	"Interview Day"; Transliteration: "Mensetsu no Hi" (Japanese: 面接の日)	Shigeru Kimiya	Tatsuhiko Urahata	May 24, 2000
At the cottage, Yuriko schedules Keaton for a job interview for tomorrow afternoon at Tozai University. Taihei later arrives to borrow some money from Keaton, who is advised to avoid becoming indebted to a woman. After using the money to buy ten kilograms of beef, Tahei is halted by two Chinese gunrunners asking the whereabouts of a certain Mei Lin. Taihei manages to escape thanks to Taisuke's distraction and Keaton's unseen aid. After Keaton witnesses Taihei buying ten more kilograms of beef the next day, Keaton follows Taihei to an abandoned warehouse. Keaton encounters Pai Li, a young Taiwanese woman who is nurturing Mei Lin, a Malayan tiger. Pai Li's father died a year ago after a mafia of gunrunners called the Red Dragon assumed his enormous debt by confiscating his animal shop. The Red Dragon legally sold Mei Lin to Japan for research purposes, but Taihei and Pai Li managed to rescue Mei Lin and use the warehouse as a hideout. Unfortunately, Taisuke leads the Red Dragon directly to the warehouse. The Red Dragon fall prey to several booby traps set up by Keaton, Taihei and Pai Li, but the mafia boss eventually takes Pai Li as a hostage. Luckily, Mei Lin appears and attacks the mafia boss in time. After the Red Dragon is apprehended, Keaton deduces that the Red Dragon actually wanted to smuggle Tokarev pistols hidden underneath the warehouse floorboards. Due to the incident, Keaton missed out on attending the job interview.
38	14	"Hunting Season: Part One"; Transliteration: "Kariudo no Kisetsu (Zenpen)" (Japanese: 狩人の季節 (前編))	Shinsaku Sasaki	Shinzō Fujita	June 21, 2000
Chief Otter leads an investigation concerning James Wolf, a former staff sergeant skilled with military fighting knives. In Whitechapel, James saved Clare from three members from the Corsican mafia and murdered one of them named Robin, a hoodlum from Mayfair. In Earl's Court, James previously killed Paul Sparrow, a former military agent who was a heroin smuggler in Afghanistan. Otter confirms with Colonel Fox that the main culprit is James, who left the Special Air Service after attacking a colleague. Meanwhile, James shelters Clare, who worked for Leon Hannah, the Corsican mafia boss involved in drug trafficking and human trafficking. As it is revealed that Clare is a cocaine addict, James later attempts to offer Hannah 300,000 pounds in exchange for Clare's freedom. Personally summoned by Fox in order to hunt down James, Keaton recalls that James was his former instructor but left the Special Air Service in order to take care of his daughter Karen Wolf. James tells Clare to meet him at an inn in Southport. Keaton learns that Paul cut James out of the cocaine smuggling business and worked with the Corsican mafia instead. At an estate in Ilford, Keaton and Otter visit Lord Swan, a sponsor in the business, but Swan does not heed their warning about James. Otter triggers a laser sensor alarm when he tries to follow Keaton to the backyard. After becoming surrounded by Corsican mafia guards and their Dobermanns, Keaton clears up the confusion, allowing him and Otter to leave unharmed.
39	15	"Hunting Season: Part Two"; Transliteration: "Kariudo no Kisetsu (Kōhen)" (Japanese: 狩人の季節 (後編))	Masayuki Kojima	Shinzō Fujita	June 21, 2000
Before driving away from the estate, Otter learns that Keaton's skilled fencing instructor James attacked Keaton's sadistic combat instructor Al Flare during a training demonstration. Hannah plans to use Clare as bait to catch James. After James's sister explains that James's daughter Karen became a drug addict and died in a car accident after running away, she begs Keaton to save James from sacrificing his life. Otter relays a message for Keaton to meet James at Ladywell. James tells Keaton that he shot at a brown rabbit during childhood, but it escaped with an injured left hind leg. The Corsican mafia guards remind Hannah that he is only supposed to capture Clare, but Hannah goes against the deal and plans to kill James by himself. Although James's business partner Paul and financier Swan previously sold James out of the drug smuggling business, James murdered Paul for having sold drugs to Karen, who was later killed by an oncoming truck. At night, Keaton and James infiltrate the estate, managing to get past the Dobermanns and the Corsican mafia guards. Keaton rescues Clare from captivity, while James murders Hannah, though incurring a wound on his arm in the process. Otter arrests Swan at a dock and prevents him from drug smuggling. James says farewell to Keaton as it begins to snow. In the inn, Clare spots a white rabbit outside, noting that it has the courage to fight even if it gets cornered.
