= List of animated television series of 1994 =

This is a list of animated television series first aired in 1994.

Animated television series first aired in 1994
| Title | Seasons | Episodes | Country | Year | Original channel | Technique |
|---|---|---|---|---|---|---|
| Aaahh!!! Real Monsters | 4 | 52 | United States | 1994–97 | Nickelodeon | Traditional |
| Aladdin: The Series | 3 | 86 | United States | 1994–95 | The Disney Channel (1994); Syndication (1994–95); CBS (1995) | Traditional |
| The Baby Huey Show | 2 | 26 | United States; Canada (season 1) | 1994–95 | Syndication | Traditional |
| BattleTech: The Animated Series | 1 | 13 | United States | 1994 | Syndication | Traditional |
| Beethoven | 1 | 13 | United States | 1994 | CBS | Traditional |
| The Brothers Grunt | 1 | 42 | Canada; United States | 1994–95 | MTV | Traditional |
| Budgie the Little Helicopter | 3 | 39 | United Kingdom | 1994–96 | ITV | Traditional |
| Bump in the Night | 2 | 26 | United States | 1994–95 | ABC | Stop-Motion; Live-action |
| The Busy World of Richard Scarry | 5 | 65 | Canada; France | 1994–96 | Family Channel; Ici Radio-Canada Télé; France 3 Canal J | Traditional |
| Caroline et ses amis | 2 | 52 | France | 1994–96 | France 2 | Traditional |
| Conan and the Young Warriors | 1 | 13 | United States | 1994 | CBS | Traditional |
| Les Contes du chat perché | 1 | 15 | France | 1994 | Canal+ | Traditional |
| Creepy Crawlers | 2 | 23 | United States; France | 1994–96 | Syndication | Traditional |
| The Critic | 2 | 23 | United States | 1994–95 | ABC (1994); Fox (1995) | Traditional |
| Davy Crockett | 1 | 26 | France | 1994 | TF1 | Traditional |
| Dino Babies | 2 | 26 | Canada; Ireland; United Kingdom; United States; China | 1994–96 | BBC One | Traditional |
| Dr. Zitbag's Transylvania Pet Shop | 4 | 65 | France; United Kingdom | 1994–97 | TF1; CITV | Traditional |
| Duckman | 4 | 70 | United States | 1994–97 | USA Network | Traditional |
| Fantastic Four | 2 | 26 | United States | 1994–96 | Syndication | Traditional |
| Fourways Farm | 1 | 25 | United Kingdom | 1994–96 | Channel 4 | Stop motion |
| Free Willy | 2 | 21 | United States; Canada; France; Netherlands | 1994–95 | ABC; Global Television Network; Canal+ S.A. | Traditional |
| Gargoyles | 3 | 78 | United States; Canada (season 3); Japan (seasons 1–2) | 1994–97 | Syndication (1994–96); ABC (1996–97) | Traditional |
| The Head | 2 | 14 | United States | 1994–96 | MTV | Traditional |
| Highlander: The Animated Series | 2 | 40 | France; Canada; United States | 1994–96 | USA Network (1994–95); Syndication; M6 | Traditional |
| Insektors | 2 | 26 | France | 1994–95 | Canal+ France 3 RTBF 1 | CGI |
| Iron Man | 2 | 26 | United States | 1994–96 | Syndication | Traditional |
| Jay Jay the Jet Plane | 4 | 62 | United States | 1994–95 | Direct-to-video | CGI |
| Jin Jin and the Panda Patrol | 1 | 26 | United States; China | 1994 | Syndication | Traditional |
| Katie and Orbie | 6 | 78 | Canada | 1994–2003 | Family Channel | Traditional (1994–2001); Flash (2002–03) |
| Léo et Popi | 5 | 104 | France | 1994–97 | France 3 | Traditional |
| Life with Louie | 3 | 39 | United States | 1994–98 | Fox Kids | Traditional |
| Magic Adventures of Mumfie | 3 | 79 | United Kingdom | 1994–98 | ITV (season 1); Fox Family Channel and Nick Jr. (seasons 2–3) | Traditional |
| The Magic House | 3 | 52 | United Kingdom | 1994–96 | ITV (CITV) | Stop motion |
| The Magic School Bus | 4 | 52 | United States; Canada | 1994–97 | PBS | Traditional |
| The Magicletters | 1 | 26 | Spain | 1994 | TV3 | Traditional |
| Mega Man | 2 | 27 | United States; Japan | 1994–96 | Syndication | Traditional |
| Mon Âne | 2 | 30 | France | 1994–96 | France 3 | Stop motion |
| Monster Force | 1 | 13 | United States; Canada | 1994 | Syndication | Traditional |
| Monty | 1 | 13 | United Kingdom | 1994–95 | BBC1 | Traditional |
| Mutant League | 2 | 40 | United States | 1994–96 | Syndication | Traditional |
| Once Upon a Time... The Discoverers | 1 | 26 | France | 1994 | Canal+ | Traditional |
| Les Pastagums | 1 | 26 | France | 1994 | France 3 | Traditional |
| Phantom 2040 | 1 | 35 | France; United States | 1994–96 | Syndication | Traditional |
| ReBoot | 4 | 48 | Canada | 1994–2001 | YTV | CGI |
| Red Planet | 1 | 3 | United States | 1994 | Fox Kids | Traditional |
| Robinson Sucroe | 1 | 26 | Canada; France; United Kingdom | 1994–95 | Canal+ | Traditional |
| Short Circutz | 1 | 32 | Canada | 1994–96 | YTV | CGI |
| The Silver Brumby | 3 | 39 | Australia | 1994–98 | Network Ten | Traditional |
| Skeleton Warriors | 1 | 13 | United States | 1994 | CBS | Traditional |
| Space Ghost Coast to Coast | 11 | 109 | United States | 1994–2008 | Cartoon Network (1994–2001); Adult Swim (2001–04); GameTap (2006–08) | Traditional (1994–96); Flash (1997–2008) |
| Spider-Man: The Animated Series | 5 | 65 | United States | 1994–98 | Fox Kids Network | Traditional |
| Street Sharks | 3 | 40 | United States | 1994–97 | Syndication(seasons 1–2); ABC (season 3) | Traditional |
| Teddy Trucks | 1 | 13 | United Kingdom | 1994 | BBC1 | Traditional |
| The Tick | 3 | 36 | United States | 1994–96 | Fox Kids | Traditional |
| Vartmaan | 1 | 26 | India | 1994–95 | DD National | CGI |
| Where on Earth Is Carmen Sandiego? | 4 | 40 | United States | 1994–99 | Fox Kids (1994–98); Fox Family Channel (1998–99) | Traditional |
| Wild C.A.T.s | 1 | 13 | United States; Canada | 1994–95 | CBS | Traditional |
| William's Wish Wellingtons | 2 | 26 | United Kingdom | 1994–96 | BBC One (episodes 1–12 and 21–26); BBC Two (episodes 1–12 and 21–26) | Traditional |
| Willy Fog 2 | 1 | 26 | Spain | 1994–95 | La 2 | Traditional |
| Zoo Cup | 1 | 52 | France | 1994 | Canal+ | Traditional |

Anime television series first aired in 1994

| Title | Seasons | Episodes | Country | Year | Original channel | Technique |
|---|---|---|---|---|---|---|
| Akazukin Chacha | 1 | 74 | Japan | 1994–95 | TV Tokyo | Traditional |
| Asobou! Hello Kitty | 1 | 26 | Japan | 1994 | TV Tokyo | Traditional |
| Blue Seed | 1 | 26 | Japan | 1994–95 | TV Tokyo | Traditional |
| The Brave Police J-Decker | 1 | 48 | Japan | 1994–95 | ANN (Nagoya TV) | Traditional |
| Captain Tsubasa J | 1 | 47 | Japan | 1994–95 | Fuji TV | Traditional |
| Chō Kuse ni Narisō | 1 | 39 | Japan | 1994–95 | NHK | Traditional |
| Daisuki! Nendomama | 1 | 9 | Japan | 1994–95 | NHK | Stop motion |
| DNA² | 1 | 12 | Japan | 1994 | Nippon TV | Traditional |
| Gakkō no Kowai Uwasa: Hanako-san ga Kita!! | 4 | 35 | Japan | 1994–95 | Fuji TV | Traditional |
| Gene Diver | 1 | 56 | Japan | 1994–95 | NHK | Traditional |
| Ginga Sengoku Gun'yūden Rai | 1 | 52 | Japan | 1994–95 | TV Tokyo | Traditional |
| Goal FH | 1 | 39 | Japan | 1994 | NHK | Traditional |
| Haō Taikei Ryū Knight | 1 | 52 | Japan | 1994–95 | TV Tokyo | Traditional |
| Huckleberry Finn Monogatari | 1 | 26 | Japan | 1994–95 | NHK | Traditional |
| Karaoke Senshi Mike Jirō | 1 | 20 | Japan | 1994–95 | NHK | Traditional |
| Kyōfu no Kyō-chan | 1 | 7 | Japan | 1994–95 | Fuji TV | Traditional |
| The Legend of Snow White | 1 | 52 | Japan | 1994–95 | NHK | Traditional |
| Macross 7 | 1 | 49 | Japan | 1994–95 | MBS | Traditional |
| Magic Knight Rayearth | 1 | 20 | Japan | 1994–95 | NNS (ytv) | Traditional |
| Magical Circle Guru Guru | 1 | 45 | Japan | 1994–95 | TV Asahi | Traditional |
| Marmalade Boy | 1 | 76 | Japan | 1994–95 | TV Asahi | Traditional |
| Metal Fighter Miku | 1 | 13 | Japan | 1994 | TV Tokyo | Traditional |
| Mobile Fighter G Gundam | 1 | 49 | Japan | 1994–95 | TV Asahi | Traditional |
| Montana Jones | 1 | 52 | Japan; Italy | 1994–95 | NHK | Traditional |
| Omakase Scrappers | 1 | 39 | Japan | 1994–95 | NHK | Traditional |
| Oyako Club | | 1818 | Japan | 1994–2013 | Fuji TV | Traditional |
| Pacusi | 1 | 18 | Japan | 1994–95 | NHK | Stop motion |
| Red Baron | 1 | 49 | Japan | 1994–95 | Nippon TV | Traditional |
| Robot Pulta | | 47 | Japan | 1994–present | NHK | Stop motion |
| Sailor Moon S | 1 | 38 | Japan | 1994–95 | TV Asahi | Traditional |
| Shinken Densetsu: Tight Road | 1 | 13 | Japan | 1994 | TV Tokyo | Traditional |
| Soccer Fever | 1 | 51 | Japan; Italy | 1994–95 | NHK | Traditional |
| Tico of the Seven Seas | 1 | 39 | Japan | 1994 | Fuji TV | Traditional |
| Tonde Burin | 1 | 51 | Japan | 1994–95 | MBS | Traditional |
| Tottemo! Luckyman | 1 | 50 | Japan | 1994–95 | TV Tokyo | Traditional |
| Yamato Takeru | 1 | 37 | Japan | 1994 | JNN (TBS) | Traditional |

== See also ==
- List of animated feature films of 1994
- List of Japanese animation television series of 1994
