= List of animated feature films of 1994 =

This is a list of animated feature films first released in 1994.

== List ==
Title	Country	Director	Production company	Animation technique	Format	Notes	Release date	Duration
A Troll in Central Park	United States	Don Bluth; Gary Goldman	Don Bluth Entertainment; Warner Bros. Family Entertainment (distributor)	Traditional	Theatrical		October 7, 1994	76 minutes
Asterix Conquers America; Asterix in Amerika; Astérix et les Indiens	Germany; France	Gerhard Hahn	Extrafilm Produktion GmbH; Jugendfilm; 20th Century Fox (distributor)	Traditional	Theatrical	Seventh installment in the Asterix film semiries; Plot loosely adapted from volume 22 of the comic book series.	September 29, 1994	85 minutes
Baki the Grappler グラップラー刃牙 (Gurappurā Baki)	Japan	Yuji Asada	Knack Productions	Traditional	Direct-to-video; OVA		August 21, 1994	45 minutes
Blue Seagull 블루시걸 (Beullusigeol)	South Korea	Oh Jung-il	Yong Seong CineCom; Cine Line Korea	Traditional	Theatrical		November 5, 1994	85 minutes
Captain Tsubasa: The Most Powerful Opponent! Holland Youth キャプテン翼 最強の敵! オランダユース (Kyaputen Tsubasa: Saikyu no Tenki! Hollanda Youth)	Japan	Yoriyasu Kogawa	J.C.Staff; Yomiko Advertising, Inc. Shueisha; Shonen Jump Video	Traditional	Theatrical; OVA	First released theatrically this year as a part of the film festival Jump Super Anime Tour '94 before its intended home video debut one year and eleven months later on December 16, 1995.	August 21, 1994	48 minutes
A Christmas Carol	United States; Japan	Toshiyuki Hiruma; Takashi	Jetlag Productions	Traditional	Direct-to-video		November 5, 1994	49 minutes
Cinderella	United States; Japan	Toshiyuki Hiruma; Takashi	Jetlag Productions	Traditional	Direct-to-video		April 15, 1994	48 minutes
Cosmic Fantasy: Galaxy Cougar's Trap コズミック・ファンタジー 銀河女豹の罠 (Kozumikku Fantajī Ginga Mehyō no Wana)	Japan	Kazuhiro Ochi	Jitensha; Tokuma Shoten	Traditional	Direct-to-video; OVA	OVA tie-in to Cosmic Fantasy 4: Ginga Shōnen Densetsu, the two-part fourth and final installment of the Cosmic Fantasy video game series which lasted from 1990 to 1994.	August 25, 1994	42 minutes
Crayon Shin-chan: The Secret Treasure of Buri Buri Kingdom クレヨンしんちゃん ブリブリ王国の秘宝 (Kureyon Shinchan: Buriburi Ōkoku no Hihō)	Japan	Hiro Yūki	Shin-Ei Animation; Toho (distributor)	Traditional	Theatrical		April 23, 1994	93 minutes
Darkside Blues ダークサイド・ブルース (Dākusaido Burūsu)	Japan	Yoshimichi Furukawa	J.C.Staff	Traditional	Theatrical		October 8, 1994	83 minutes
Dengeki Oshioki Musume Gōtaman: Gōtaman Tanjō-hen 臀撃おしおき娘 ゴータマン ゴータマン誕生編 (Butt Attack Punisher Girl Gotaman: The Birth of Gotaman Edition)	Japan	Iku Suzuki	Hero; Movic; Studio Kikan; Bandai Visual (distributor)	Traditional	Direct-to-video; OVA		May 24, 1994	45 minutes
Dengeki Oshioki Musume Gōtaman R: Ai to Kanashimi no Final Battle 臀撃おしおき娘 ゴータマンＲ 愛と悲しみのファイナル・バトル (Butt Attack Punisher Girl Gotaman R: Final Battle of Love and Sorrow)	Japan	Hiroshi Yoshida	Studio Kikan; Bandai Visual (distributor)	Traditional	Direct-to-video; OVA		October 24, 1994	46 minutes
The Devils of the Dohyō 土俵の鬼たち (Dohyō no Oni-tachi)	Japan	Naoyuki Yoshinaga	Studio Deen; Shochiku (distributor)	Traditional	Theatrical	Fictionalisation of the life story of Wakanohana Kanji I (March 16, 1928 – September 1, 2010), a Japanese professional sumo wrestler.	May 21, 1994	95 minutes
Doraemon: Nobita's Three Visionary Swordsmen ドラえもん のび太と夢幻三剣士 (Doraemon: Nobita to Mugen Sankenshi)	Japan	Tsutomu Shibayama	Asatsu; Shin-Ei Animation; Toho	Traditional	Theatrical		March 12, 1994	99 minutes
Dosukoi! Wanpaku Dohyō どすこい！わんぱく土俵 (Sumo Exclamation! Naughty Dohyō)	Japan	Seijiro Kamiyama	Mook Animation; Shochiku (distributor)	Traditional	Theatrical	Originally first shown as a double feature with Dohyō no Oni-tachi.	May 21, 1994	55 minutes
Dot in Space	Australia	Yoram Gross	Yoram Gross Studios	Traditional	Theatrical	Ninth and final installment in the Australian Dot animated film series.	June 19, 1994	63 minutes
Dragon Ball Z: Bio-Broly ドラゴンボールZ 超戦士撃破!!勝つのはオレだ (Doragon Bōru Zetto Sūpā Senshi Gekiha!! Katsu No wa Ore da)	Japan	Yoshihiro Ueda	Toei Animation	Traditional	Theatrical		July 9, 1994	46 minutes
Dragon Ball Z: Broly – Second Coming ドラゴンボールZ 危険なふたり!超戦士はねむれない (Doragon Bōru Zetto Kiken na Futari! Sūpā Senshi wa Nemurenai)	Japan	Shigeyasu Yamauchi	Toei Animation	Traditional	Theatrical		March 12, 1994	52 minutes
Fatal Fury: The Motion Picture 餓狼伝説 -THE MOTION PICTURE- (Garō Densetsu Za Mōshon Pikuchā)	Japan	Masami Ōbari	Studio Cockpit; Shochiku	Traditional	Theatrical		July 16, 1994	100 minutes
Felidae	Germany	Michael Schaack	Trickompany; A. Film A/S	Traditional	Theatrical		November 3, 1994	82 minutes
A Flintstones Christmas Carol	United States	Joanna Romersa	Hanna-Barbera	Traditional	Television film		November 21, 1994	70 minutes
The Gate to the Mind's Eye	United States	Michael Boydstun	Miramar Images Inc.	Computer	Direct-to-video; Art film Compilation film	Third installment in the Mind's Eye film series.	October 25, 1994	55 minutes
Ghost Sweeper Mikami: The Great Paradise Battle!! GS美神 極楽大作戦!! (Gōsuto Suīpā Mikami Gokuraku Daisakusen!!)	Japan	Atsutoshi Umezawa	Toei Animation	Traditional	Theatrical		August 20, 1994	60 minutes
Goldilocks and the Three Bears	Australia	Richard Slapczynski	Burbank Animation Studios	Traditional	Direct-to-video		January 1, 1994	49 minutes
Happy, the Littlest Bunny	United States; Japan	Toshiyuki Hiruma; Takashi	Jetlag Productions	Traditional	Direct-to-video		March 19, 1994	47 minutes
Harold and the Ghosts; Harold und die Geister	Germany	Curt Linda	Linda Film; Stockmann Filmverlag	Traditional	Theatrical; Live-action animated film			83 minutes
The Hero of Two Worlds; L'eroe dei due mondi	Italy	Guido Manuli	Istituto Luce-Italnoleggio Cinematografico; Rai 2	Traditional			December 23, 1994	82 minutes
J League o 100-bai Tanoshiku Miru Hōhō!! Jリーグを100倍楽しく見る方法!! (How to Watch the J League 100 Times More Fun!!)	Japan	Itsumichi Isomura	Ajia-do Animation Works; Project Team Sarah; TBS; Toho (distributor)	Traditional	Theatrical		June 11, 1994	105 minutes
The Jungle King	United States	Diane Eskenazi (uncredited)	Golden Films; Sony Wonder (distributor)	Traditional	Direct-to-video		June 21, 1994	48 minutes
Kattobase! Dreamers ―Carp Tanjō Monogatari― かっ飛ばせ！ドリーマーズ ―カープ誕生物語― (Skip It! Dreamers ―Carp Birth Story―)	Japan	Yoshinori Kanemori	Hiroshima Movie Center; Madhouse	Traditional	Theatrical		January 22, 1994	86 minutes
Kibun wa Uaa Jitsuzai OL Kōza 気分は形而上[うああ] 実在OL講座 ("Mood is Metaphysical (Uah) Real Office Lady Lecture)	Japan	Tetsuo Yasumi	Group TAC; Toho (distributor)	Traditional	Direct-to-video; OVA		January 14, 1994	45 minutes
The Land Before Time II: The Great Valley Adventure	United States	Roy Allen Smith	Universal Cartoon Studios	Traditional	Direct-to-video	Second installment in The Land Before Time film series.	December 23, 1994	73 minutes
The Land Surveyor; Землемер (Zemlemer)	Russia	Valentin Telegin; Dmitry Nahumov		Traditional				46 minutes
Leo the Lion: King of the Jungle	United States; Japan	Toshiyuki Hiruma; Takashi	Jetlag Productions	Traditional	Direct-to-video		July 20, 1994	46 minutes
The Life of Guskou Budori グスコーブドリの伝記 (Gusukō Budori no Denki)	Japan	Ryutaro Nakamura	Kyōdō Eiga Zenkoku Keiretsu Kaigi; Bandai Visual; Animaruya	Traditional	Theatrical		July 16, 1994	85 minutes
The Lion King	United States	Roger Allers; Rob Minkoff	Walt Disney Feature Animation	Traditional	Theatrical	The highest grossing traditional animated feature of all time.	June 24, 1994	88 minutes
Lupin III: Dragon of Doom ルパン三世『燃えよ斬鉄剣』 (Rupan Sansei: Moeyo Zantetsuken)	Japan	Masaharu Okuwaki	Tokyo Movie Shinsha; Nippon TV	Traditional	Television special		July 29, 1994	90 minutes
The Magic Flute	United States	Ron Myrick; Marlene Robinson May	Ruby-Spears	Traditional	Television special	Originally aired on the ABC anthology series ABC Weekend Special as a two-part installment on the series' sixteenth season.	April 30, 1994	44 minutes
The Night Before Christmas	United States	Hazel Morgan; Diane Eskenazi (uncredited)	Golden Films; Sony Wonder (distributor)	Traditional	Direct-to-video		October 4, 1994	48 minutes
Once Upon a Time; Det var en gang (It Was Once)	Norway	Ketil Jakobsen		Traditional	Theatrical		August 19, 1994	62 minutes
The Pagemaster	United States	Joe Johnston; Pixote Hunt	Turner Pictures	Traditional/Live action	Theatrical; Live-action animated film		November 23, 1994	75 minutes
Plastic Little プラスチックリトル (Purasuchikku Ritoru)	Japan	Kinji Yoshimoto	Animate; KSS; MOVIC; Pierrot; Sony Music Entertainment	Traditional	Direct-to-video; OVA		March 21, 1994	47 minutes
Pocahontas	United States; Japan	Toshiyuki Hiruma; Takashi	Jetlag Productions	Traditional	Direct-to-video		October 19, 1994	45 minutes
Pom Poko 平成狸合戦ぽんぽこ (Heisei Tanuki Gassen Ponpoko)	Japan	Isao Takahata	Studio Ghibli; Toho	Traditional	Theatrical		July 16, 1994	119 minutes
Pumuckl and the Blue Klabauter; Pumuckl und der blaue Klabauter	Germany	Alfred Deutsch; Horst Schier	Infafilm; Videovox Stúdió (co-production); Bayerischer Rundfunk (BR) (co-production); Buena Vista International (distributor)	Traditional/Live action	Theatrical; Live-action animated film	Second film based on the German children's radio and television series Meister Eder und sein Pumuckl created by Ellis Kaut.	March 24, 1994	86 minutes
The Return of Jafar	United States	Tad Stones; Alan Zaslove	Walt Disney Television Animation	Traditional	Direct-to-video	First Disney direct-to-video animated film.	May 20, 1994	69 minutes
The Return of the North Wind; El regreso del viento del Norte	Spain	Maite Ruiz de Austri	?	Traditional	?	?	?	77 minutes
Sailor Moon S: The Movie 劇場版 美少女戦士セーラームーンＳ (Gekijō-ban Bishōjo Senshi Sērā Mūn Sūpā)	Japan	Hiroki Shibata	Toei Animation	Traditional	Theatrical		December 4, 1994	61 minutes
Saitama Bōsō Saizensen Flag! Shinimonogurui no Seishun!! 埼玉暴走最前線 フラッグ! 死にものぐるいの青春!!	Japan	Tetsu Dezaki	Magic Bus	Traditional	Direct-to-video; OVA		December 1, 1994	45 minutes
Samurai Shodown: The Motion Picture; SAMURAI SPIRITS 〜破天降魔の章〜 (Samurai Spirits: Haten Gōma no Shō)	Japan	Hiroshi Ishiodori	Studio Comet; Studio Gazelle	Traditional	Television film		September 8, 1994	68 minutes
Sangokushi (dai 3-bu): Harukanaru Taichi 三国志（第３部）遙かなる大地 (Romance of the Three Kingdoms (Part 3): The Faraway Earth)	Japan	Tomoharu Katsumata	Toei Animation; Enoki Films	Traditional	Theatrical	Part three of a three-part animated film series based on the Chinese novel Romance of the Three Kingdoms	April 9, 1994	147 minutes
Scooby-Doo in Arabian Nights	United States	Jun Falkenstein; Joanna Romersa	Hanna-Barbera	Traditional	Television film		September 3, 1994	69 minutes
The Secret Garden	United States	Dave Edwards	Mike Young Productions; Greengrass Productions; DIC Entertainment	Traditional	Television special	Originally aired on the ABC anthology series ABC Weekend Special as the first installment on the series' seventeenth and final season.	November 5, 1994	69 minutes
Slam Dunk: Conquer the Nation, Hanamichi Sakuragi! スラムダンク 全国制覇だ！桜木花道	Japan	Nobutaka Nishizawa	Toei Animation	Traditional	Theatrical		July 9, 1994	45 minutes
Soreike! Anpanman Ririkaru Majikaru Mahō no Gakkō それいけ! アンパンマン リリカル☆マジカルまほうの学校 (Let's Go! Anpanman: The Lyrical Magical Witch's School)	Japan	Akinori Nagaoka; Hiroyuki Yano	Tokyo Movie Shinsha	Traditional	Theatrical		July 16, 1994	60 minutes
The Story of Christmas	United States; France	Henri Heidsieck	Nest Family Entertainment; Hemdale Home Video	Traditional	Direct-to-video		October 19, 1994	47 minutes
Street Fighter II: The Animated Movie ストリートファイターII MOVIE (Sutorīto Faitā Tsū Mūbī)	Japan	Gisaburō Sugii	Group TAC	Traditional	Theatrical		August 6, 1994	102 minutes
Super Kid 슈퍼 차일드 (Syupeochaildeu)	South Korea	Eom Lee-yong	UM Production	Traditional	Theatrical		July 23, 1994	100 minutes
The Swan Princess	United States	Richard Rich	Nest Family Entertainment; Rich Animation Studios	Traditional	Theatrical		November 18, 1994	90 minutes
Taxandria	Belgium	Raoul Servais	ANAGRAM	Traditional/Live action	Theatrical		October 4, 1994	82 minutes
Thumbelina	United States; Ireland	Don Bluth; Gary Goldman	Don Bluth Entertainment; Warner Bros. Family Entertainment (distributor)	Traditional	Theatrical		March 30, 1994	86 minutes
Urotsukidōji III: Return of the Overfiend Director's Edition 超神伝説うろつき童子 未来篇 ディレクターズ・エディション Chōjin Densetsu Urotsukidōji: Mirai-hen Director's Edition	Japan	Hideki Takayama	West Cape; Team Mu	Traditional	Theatrical	Compilation film of the four-part OVA series that ran from October 1, 1992, to August 21, 1993.	February 21, 1994	120 minutes
Yogi the Easter Bear	United States	Robert Alvarez	Hanna-Barbera	Traditional	Television special		April 3, 1994	46 minutes
Yu Yu Hakusho the Movie: Poltergeist Report 幽☆遊☆白書 冥界死闘篇 炎の絆 (Yū Yū Hakusho: Meikai Shitō Hen – Honō no Kizuna)	Japan	Masakatsu Iijima	Studio Pierrot; Movic; Toho (distributor)	Traditional	Theatrical		April 9, 1994	95 minutes

== Highest-grossing animated films of the year ==
Rank	Title	Studio	Worldwide gross	Ref.
1	The Lion King	Walt Disney Feature Animation	$979,163,108	
2	Pom Poko	Studio Ghibli	$27,275,730 (¥2.63 billion)	
3	Street Fighter II: The Animated Movie	Group TAC; Capcom	$16,000,000	
4	Dragon Ball Z 10: Broly – Second Coming	Toei Animation	$15,037,950 (¥1.45 billion)	
5	Doraemon: Nobita's Three Visionary Swordsmen	Asatsu	$14,000,850 (¥1.35 billion)	
6	The Pagemaster	Turner Pictures	$13,670,688	
7	Thumbelina	Don Bluth Entertainment	$11,373,501	
8	The Swan Princess	New Line Cinema	$9,771,658	

== See also ==
- List of animated television series of 1994
