= Katie and Orbie =

Children's animated TV series

- Orbie (left) and Katie (right). Image taken from the Season 6 episode "Hearts!".
- Genre: Children's television series
- Created by: Ben Wicks and Susan Wicks
- Written by: Mary Mackay-Smith; Ben Wicks; Susan Wicks
- Directed by: Lee Williams; Hana Kukal; Richard Vanatte; Maryl T. Morris; Daisy von Scherler Mayer
- Voices of: Chris Wightman; Amanda Tripp
- Narrated by: Leslie Nielsen
- Composer: Edmund Eagan
- Country of origin: Canada
- Original language: English
- No. of seasons: 6
- No. of episodes: 78 (234 segments) (list of episodes)

Production
- Executive producer: Sheldon S. Wiseman
- Producers: Mark Edwards; Weldon Poapst
- Running time: 26 minutes
- Production companies: Lacewood Productions (1994–1996); Amberwood Entertainment (2001–2003)

Original release
- Network: Family Channel
- Release: January 3, 1994 – June 9, 2003

Katie and Orbie is a Canadian animated television series aimed at preschoolers, originally broadcast in Canada from 1994 to 2003 on Family Channel and later aired in the USA on PBS from 1995 to 1997 and cable television network Disney Channel (part of Playhouse Disney) from 1997 to 2000. In Canada, the series aired uninterruptedly on Family Channel and beginning in 2007, on Disney Junior (formerly called Playhouse Disney) until December 31, 2012. A total of 78 episodes were produced over six seasons. The series has also aired in different countries around the world.

== Characters ==
=== Main ===
- Katie – A five-year-old blonde-haired human girl, who is imaginative, playful, curious and usually quite happy. She almost always wears a green and white striped sleeved shirt with blue overalls and brown shoes. She lives with her best friend/adoptive brother Orbie and her parents. She is very kind and friendly with most people. While she does not attend school yet, she takes dancing classes in some episodes. Her sound effects include a characteristic laugh, as well as a bit sighing, yelling and crying sounds. Those sound effects, as well as her "voice" during the Did You Know? segments, were made by Amanda Tripp.
- Orbie – A small pink alien from an unknown planet from outside Earth's Solar System. "Katie and Orbie Pick Up the Garbage", one of the books on which the series is based, explains that he was sent away from his home planet because it was too polluted to sustain life, and the fate of his native family or his species is unknown (this is, however, never mentioned in the actual series). While travelling in a small spaceship, he reached Earth and just happened to land in Katie's backyard, and immediately he and Katie became best friends, resulting in him being "adopted" by Katie's parents, essentially becoming Katie's brother. He is the same age as Katie, and shares many aspects of her personality. He speaks in a unique series of squeaks and chirps, as well as honk sounds made with his nose, that people appear to be able to understand despite the fact that he is not speaking any known language. He has red polka dots on his body (early episodes show him as being capable of changing the color of his spots, depending on his mood). People are shown to be oblivious to the fact that he's an alien, and treat him like a normal person, and in any cases where a character is surprised at first glance by Orbie, he warms up to him after getting to know him better. He is naked, but he will wear clothing and boots if it's raining, cold or snowing. He is also a natural acrobat, often breaking into leaps and flips out of pure joy and has pads on his fingers and toes which enable him to climb walls and hang from the ceiling. He can also use these pads to help him climb other things, but they work best on flat surfaces. He sleeps in Katie's closet, hanging upside down from the bar like a bat. His sound effects were made by Chris Wightman.
- Wayne – Katie's father and Orbie's adoptive father. He is always referred to as Dad, but his real name is mentioned in the episode "The Thunderstorm". He works at an office building, but his actual job is never mentioned. He is very thoughtful towards Katie, Orbie, and his wife, Susan, and often acts in a funny way to amuse them. He was born and raised in the city, where his parents still live.
- Susan – Katie's mother and Orbie's adoptive mother. She is always referred to as Mom, but her real name is mentioned in the episode "Mrs. Parette's Picture". Although she is mostly seen at home, she apparently holds an unknown job too, being shown in some episodes as making or taking business calls, mentioned as doing paperwork, going into the city to attend meetings and even winning an award for her work. Her parents live in the same suburb as the family.

=== Recurring ===
- Mrs. Elaine Parette – A friend of the family, an elderly woman who likes children and is usually seen baking cakes or cookies for them. She has a big willow tree in her garden which serves as a hideout for Katie, Orbie and their friends. She also likes painting. She has at least one daughter, as well as at least two grandchildren. She is always referred simply as Mrs. Parette, being one of the few characters that has a surname. Her name, Elaine, was mentioned by Susan in the story "Mrs. Parette's Picture", which was her first appearance.
- Chance – The family's pet cat. She has orange fur, except for her left ear which has white fur.
- Andy – A blond-haired boy (of a lighter blonde than Katie). His parents are divorced and he lives with his mother and his stepfather named Harry. He is one of the three regular friends of the main characters, the others being Arthur and Yee Ping.
- Arthur – A redheaded Jewish boy who was initially a bully who got angry easily, and could even hit someone who bothered him (Katie on only one occasion for some reason). After that episode, his character changed to that of a simple boy, although a bit mischievous, who plays normally with the other kids.
- Yee Ping – A black-haired Chinese girl who is very friendly and has even educated Katie and Orbie on Chinese traditions occasionally. After Orbie, she was Katie's second friend introduced in the series. At the start of the series, her skin was of a light brown color, but it became white by the end.
- Kyra – A girl with the same hair color as Andy, wearing a light blue diadem over it. She has asthma and, in a later appearance, also wears glasses. She mostly appears during seasons 2 and 3. Along with Dakota, she is rarely seen during seasons 4–6.
- Phoebe and Bryn – Two sisters who are always seen together. Phoebe is the youngest and Bryn is the oldest. Phoebe has blonde hair, and Bryn has brown hair. Bryn has an egg allergy.
- Dakota – A First Nations boy. Although a common character in seasons 1–3, he is practically written out on seasons 4–6, only appearing a few times, and is "replaced" by the Latino character Miguel.
- Micah – A nine-year-old boy who has Down syndrome (the first character with said condition to appear in an animated series). He lives on a farm with his mother, Ara, who is also a longtime friend of Susan. He is very good at playing drums and caring for the farm animals.
- Tom – A young adult man who usually serves as Katie and Orbie's babysitter.
- Polly – Tom's girlfriend. Like Tom, she likes children very much and loves to play with them. Orbie once had a crush on her. She only appears on a few stories. Her appearance changed between episodes; at first, she had curly red hair and white skin, and later, she had straight, black hair tied in a ponytail, and dark skin.
- Belkis – A dark-skinned foreign girl who does not speak English and comes from an unspecified country along with her mother.
- Charisse – A dark-skinned black girl who has cerebral palsy and uses a wheelchair, she lives with her mother in a 17th floor apartment. Her appearances are scarce.
- Miguel is a Latino boy who joins the series by the end of the fourth season although his appearances are scarce. He strongly resembles Dakota, except he has a lighter skin colour.
- Charlie and Megan Cobbington – Siblings who are neighbors to Katie and Orbie, along with their parents, and they also have four other siblings. Charlie and the parents are written out of the series after season 2, but Megan still makes brief appearances on season 3 and some cameos on seasons 4–6.
- Greg, Jenny and Megan – A young couple and their baby daughter who are neighbours of Katie and Orbie's family. They appear only in a few stories. They also have a dog named Bruce.
- Kerry is a dark-skinned black girl who had been Katie's best friend for an unspecified time, and in her only appearance (in the episode "Close to My Heart"), she and her parents moved to another town because her father had got a new job. Ironically, despite being referred to as Katie's best friend, she never appeared before and is never seen or mentioned after the aforementioned story. Mrs. Parette gave her and Katie two heart-shaped collars with photos of both, so they could remember their friendship whenever they felt alone.

== Episodes ==
Season	Episodes	Originally released	
Season	Episodes	First released	Last released
1	13	January 3, 1994	March 28, 1994
2	13	April 28, 1995	July 21, 1995
3	13	July 28, 1996	October 20, 1996
4	13	April 4, 2001	June 27, 2001
5	13	September 5, 2001	November 28, 2001
6	13	November 25, 2002	June 9, 2003

Ontario-based animation studio Lacewood Productions began work on the series in 1993, creating 13 half-hour episodes, which premiered in 1994 on Family Channel and quickly became a success, prompting Lacewood to create two further seasons in 1995 and 1996. In the third season, the series switched to digital ink and paint for colouring. The series switched to Flash animation in the sixth season.

In 1997, Lacewood Productions closed down and was taken over by Paragon Entertainment. In 1999, Amberwood Entertainment, a studio founded by Sheldon Wiseman after Lacewood's closure, acquired some of its assets from Paragon, including the series, and along with Entertainment Rights began production of 26 more episodes, which premiered on the Family Channel in 2001. However, in 2003 after the sixth season the series definitely ended production.

A total of 234 individual stories were produced, three per each half-hour episode. Each episode also had two interstitial segments titled Did You Know? which tells viewers small pieces of information regarding several subjects, such as plants, food, animals, the body and arts. These segments are narrated off-screen by Katie (voiced by Amanda Tripp).

Each episode is structured by the opening theme, the first story, a Did You Know? interstitial segment, the second story, another Did You Know? interstitial segment, the third story and the closing credits.

== Production ==
The animated series is based on a series of four environment-themed children's books titled Katie and Orbie Save the Planet, illustrated by Canadian cartoonist Ben Wicks and written by his daughter Susan Wicks, which were published in 1991. In 1993, Lacewood Productions adapted the characters into an animated series which was originally in production until 1996, being revived four years later by Amberwood Entertainment and then ending in 2003. Contrary to the original books, the series isn't strictly environment-themed, having stories that range from having a new pet or helping their friends, to address themes like children with divorced parents, Down syndrome and cerebral palsy, one of the few series aimed at preschoolers to do so.

The theme song was written by Edmund Eagan and performed by his niece, Mireille Eagan.

Unlike most TV series, Katie and Orbie was animated in a technique referred to by producer Sheldon Wiseman as "picture-mation", similar to a Play-a-sound book, instead of coming to life. Even though the animation in the series itself is very limited, there are brief moments of actual animation, such as at the end of the opening credits when a butterfly can be seen flying by, when the characters blink or they're eating. Also, none of the characters actually speak, so a variety of cartoonish sound effects are used during the stories, with a narrator telling the story. The series is narrated by Leslie Nielsen.

== DVD releases ==
Seasons 1, 4, 5 and 6 were available on DVD on the online store of the now-defunct Canadian retailer Express Media; however, seasons 2 and 3 were not.

Two DVDs were released in Australia in 2010 with season 6 episodes.
