= List of Katie and Orbie episodes =

This is an episode list for the animated series Katie and Orbie. A total of 78 half-hour episodes, or 234 segments, were produced. The series intentionally featured slideshow-like limited animation to create an effect similar to reading a storybook. In 1996, the series switched to digital ink and paint for coloring. The first 39 episodes were produced by Lacewood Productions from 1994 to 1996, and another 39 episodes were produced by Amberwood Entertainment from 2001 to 2003. Each half-hour episode consists of three seven-minute separate stories.

== Series overview ==
Season	Episodes	Originally released	
Season	Episodes	First released	Last released
1	13	January 3, 1994	March 28, 1994
2	13	April 28, 1995	July 21, 1995
3	13	July 28, 1996	October 20, 1996
4	13	April 4, 2001	June 27, 2001
5	13	September 5, 2001	November 28, 2001
6	13	November 25, 2002	June 9, 2003

== Episodes ==
=== Season 1 (1994) ===
The season was produced in 1993.

No. overall	No. in season	Title	Original release date
1	1	"The Thunderstorm / The Rabbit and How to Make It Stay / I Don't Want to be Different"	January 3, 1994 (La Chaîne TVO); February 5, 1994 (Family Channel)
2	2	"Yee Ping / 6 Cents Don't Go That Far / Mrs. Parette's Picture"	January 10, 1994 (French); February 12, 1994 (English)
3	3	"Katie's First Sleep Over / Burnt Toast / Where Does the Wind Go?"	January 17, 1994 (French); February 19, 1994 (English)
4	4	"The Day Orbie Learned His Address / Deadly Dick the Dreadful Dragon / The Babysitter"	January 24, 1994 (French); February 26, 1994 (English)
5	5	"Sore Throat / The Lemonade Stand / Where Have All the Ducks Gone?"	January 31, 1994 (French); March 5, 1994 (English)
6	6	"Park Swings / The Tree / The Day Chance Found a New Home"	February 7, 1994 (French); March 12, 1994 (English)
7	7	"Pizza with Pizzazz / I Didn't Break the Lamp / Toboggan"	February 14, 1994 (French); March 19, 1994 (English)
8	8	"Disappearing in The Dark / Puzzle Race / Skates"	February 21, 1994 (French); March 26, 1994 (English)
9	9	"Orbie and the Tuba / Great Uncle David / Andy's Birthday Present"	February 28, 1994 (French); April 2, 1994 (English)
10	10	"Taking Care of Chance / Story Dress / Katie and the Sad World"	March 7, 1994 (French); April 9, 1994 (English)
11	11	"Charisse / Book Work / Right Around the Corner"	March 14, 1994 (French); April 16, 1994 (English)
12	12	"Beach / Family Wall / Pow Wow"	March 21, 1994 (French); April 23, 1994 (English)
13	13	"Dinosaur Bones Aren't For Climbing / Dad of the Month / Drumsticks"	March 28, 1994 (French); April 30, 1994 (English)

=== Season 2 (1995) ===
No. overall	No. in season	Title	Original release date
14	1	"Made to Order Pancakes / The Chicken Pox Party / No Chance"	April 28, 1995
15	2	"How Orbie Helped the Easter Bunny / Stone Cold Soup / Orbie's Wish"	May 5, 1995
16	3	"Does it Have Eggs in It? / The Cottage / Am I Invisible?"	May 12, 1995
17	4	"Mrs. Parette and the Disappearing Berries / The Baby Bird and Old Mr. Cobbs / The Day Arthur Smacked Katie"	May 19, 1995
18	5	"The Circus / Chance and the Bird Bath / The Annual Bathtub Race"	May 26, 1995
19	6	"The Movie / Nasty Night / Dashing Through the Snow"	June 2, 1995
20	7	"The Umbrella / The Great Idea / Everybody Counts"	June 9, 1995
21	8	"How Does the Band Fit in the Radio? / The Garage Sale / A Big Heart"	June 16, 1995
22	9	"Katie's First Dance Class / Frozen Fin Cafe / Close to My Heart"	June 23, 1995
23	10	"The Farm / Splash / Lulu"	June 30, 1995
24	11	"Too Spooky For Me! / Wild Flower Bouquet / Two Fathers"	July 7, 1995
25	12	"Nobody's Perfect / Bugs / Katie and the Fine Point"	July 14, 1995
26	13	"T-Ball / Happy New Year / Kyra"	July 21, 1995

=== Season 3 (1996) ===
This is the first season which uses digital ink and paint for coloring, and the last produced by Lacewood.

No. overall	No. in season	Title	Original release date
27	1	"Surprise! / Katie's Music Box / Shop and Seek"	July 28, 1996
28	2	"The Library / Roller Skates / The Scary Movie"	August 4, 1996
29	3	"Flying High / The Block Castle / Wet"	August 11, 1996
30	4	"Fabulous Fashions / Happy Winter / Sunk"	August 18, 1996
31	5	"The Attic / The Zoo / Katie Up a Tree"	August 25, 1996
32	6	"The New Baby / Leaky Pipes / Orbits"	September 1, 1996
33	7	"Hopscotch / The Paddle Boat / Everybody Gets the Blues"	September 8, 1996
34	8	"The Shooting Star / Snow! / The Trip"	September 15, 1996
35	9	"Bruce / Too Old to Play / Yummy Dessert"	September 22, 1996
36	10	"The Treasure Hunt / The Piñata / The Bank"	September 29, 1996
37	11	"The Memory Box / Too Many Treasures / Don't Talk to Strangers"	October 6, 1996
38	12	"Mermaid / Chez K and O / That's Not My Name"	October 13, 1996
39	13	"Camping / Troll Under the Bed / Puppy Love"	October 20, 1996

=== Season 4 (2001) ===
The first seasons produced by Amberwood Entertainment. Later on, it was produced by Entertainment Rights. Marked the return of the series after a 4-year hiatus.

No. overall	No. in season	Title	Original release date
40	1	"The New Bike / Sorry / Orbie and the Tooth Fairy"	April 4, 2001
41	2	"In Kyra's Pocket / Sandbox / Yee Ping's Appendix"	April 11, 2001
42	3	"Mrs. Parette's Necklace / Orbie and the Pumpkin Seed / Bryn's New Bracelet"	April 18, 2001
43	4	"Chill / Christian / Seventh Wave"	April 25, 2001
44	5	"Pizza / Sidewalk Storybook / The Argument"	May 2, 2001
45	6	"The Snake in the Grass / Sprite / Homegrown Supper"	May 9, 2001
46	7	"Street Hockey / Bubble Trouble / Chopsticks"	May 16, 2001
47	8	"The Bike Path / The Neighborhood Picnic / Cleaning Out the Basement"	May 23, 2001
48	9	"Spider / Cowboy Boots / Footprints"	May 30, 2001
49	10	"Big City / Market / The Chocolate Factory"	June 6, 2001
50	11	"Tom's Pool Party / Dancing Fairies / Orbie and the Skunk"	June 13, 2001
51	12	"Belkis / Pretty Like Polly / The Wallet"	June 20, 2001
52	13	"Sticky Fingers / The Train Museum / Babysitting Megan"	June 27, 2001

=== Season 5 (2001) ===
No. overall	No. in season	Title	Original release date
53	1	"Katie's Paper Flower / The Car Wash / Just Doing My Job"	September 5, 2001
54	2	"Science! / "911" / The Bedspread Painting Party"	September 12, 2001
55	3	"My Favorite Song / The Milk Monster / Pills"	September 19, 2001
56	4	"Katie's New Life / Snow Art / Tag Wrestling"	September 26, 2001
57	5	"Hot Fudge Sundaes / The Badminton Game / The Fuse"	October 3, 2001
58	6	"The Lumpy Bed / Vincent and the Art Gallery / The Buskers"	October 10, 2001
59	7	"A Scary Story / John the Music Man / Orbie the Grouch"	October 17, 2001
60	8	"The New Neighbour / A Perfect Place for Us / Charisse and the Soccer Game"	October 24, 2001
61	9	"Star / Later / Rainy Day Zombies"	October 31, 2001
62	10	"Burr! / Gutter Balls / The Nibbler"	November 7, 2001
63	11	"Shannon / Grandma / Birds!"	November 14, 2001
64	12	"Orbie and the Bullfrog / Two Brothers / The Loon"	November 21, 2001
65	13	"Raccoon Rescue / Cheer Up Pals / Maple Sugar"	November 28, 2001

=== Season 6 (2002–2003) ===
No. overall	No. in season	Title	Original release date
66	1	"The Wishing Fountain / Bunton Q. Bunny / Boo Who?"	November 25, 2002
67	2	"The Fairground / Gray Day / Hearts!"	December 2, 2002
68	3	"Orbie's Special Thing / Mine! / The Summer Grocery Store"	December 9, 2002
69	4	"Tick Tock Dance / Katie's Rogue's Gallery / The Drawing Contest"	December 16, 2002
70	5	"Willow Whispers / Pink! / The Pond Prince"	December 23, 2002
71	6	"Decorate Your Bike Day / Lights! / Beach Bouncing"	December 30, 2002
72	7	"100% / The Snow Princess / Brave?"	January 6, 2003
73	8	"Garden Fairies / Ice Dance / Stones"	March 3, 2003
74	9	"Night Lights / The Garden Hose / The Notebook"	March 10, 2003
75	10	"The Troll's Wish / Bears / Mist"	March 17, 2003
76	11	"The Orchestra / The Winter Party / The Glitter Ball and the Magic Day"	March 24, 2003
77	12	"The Steam Engine / Orbie in Snow / The Water Sprite's Pearl"	May 5, 2003
78	13	"Tap Shoes / The Letter / I Really Love You"	June 9, 2003
