= List of Akazukin Chacha episodes =

This is a list of all 74 episodes of Akazukin Chacha, an anime television series based on a manga series of the same title by Min Ayahana. The television series began airing in Japan on 7 January 1994 at 6:00 pm on the TV Tokyo Network in Japan. The series ran for one and a half years, with episode 74 airing on 30 June 1995.

This list also contains the three 30-minute OVAs which were released in 1995 and 1996 following the end of the television series.

== Summary of series ==
Each television episode is about 25 minutes long.

=== Television series (1994-1995) ===
No.	Title	Original release date
1	"The Troublesome Witch Makes Her Appearance"; Transliteration: "Osawagase Mahōtsukai Tōjō" (Japanese: お騒がせ魔法使い登場)	7 January 1994
After performing a spell correctly, Chacha is told by Seravy, her master, that she can attend the local magic school. He gives her three magical items which can protect her when then their power is combined. She is told to give two of the items to her two best friends once she makes friends at the school. However, the Daimaō is not amused and has his chief underling, Sorges, send someone to stop her by having Seravy kidnapped by his rival, Dorothy. Chacha and her werewolf best friend Riiya set off to rescue Seravy. Dorothy's apprentice, Shiine, becomes enamored of Chacha and sets out to separate Chacha from Riiya as he believes he is a better match for Chacha. Chacha is oblivious to the romantic intentions of Shiine, though, and gives him one of the magical items, giving the other one to Riiya. They are then able to defeat the evil which had possessed Dorothy, and Seravy is saved. The opening theme was "Kimi-iro Omoi" (君色思い), performed by SMAP during the original broadcast and Shoko Sawada on the DVD release. The ending theme was "Egao ga Sukidakara" (笑顔が好きだから), also by Shoko Sawada.
2	"My Rival is Black-hooded"; Transliteration: "Raibaru wa Kurozukin" (Japanese: ライバルは黒ずきん)	14 January 1994
Chacha, Riiya, and Shiine begin attending the same school Dorothy and Seravy once attended. They meet their teacher, Mr. Rascal, a very emotional man who likes to "whip" his students into shape and is protective of his students. Sent by Sorges and disguised as a blackboard eraser in order to keep an eye on Chacha, a spy hits the principal and causes Mr. Rascal begins to act peculiar. On top of that, Yakko, one of their classmates, becomes jealous that Chacha has been "hogging" Seravy in the mountains for so long and challenges her to a duel.
3	"The Selfish Mermaid Marin!"; Transliteration: "Burikko Ningyo Marin!" (Japanese: ぶりっこ人魚マリン!)	21 January 1994
The class goes to the beach with Chacha, Riiya, and Shiine ending up on an island just offshore. Riiya falls into the ocean and Chacha knocks him out with a giant anchor while trying to rescue him. This causes him to have amnesia. A mermaid named Marin rescues Riiya as he is sinking toward the bottom, then instantly falls in love with him. She spends the rest of the episode trying to keep Chacha away from Riiya so she can keep him all to herself.
4	"Certain Strike! The Three Little Pigs Attack"; Transliteration: "Hissatsu! Sanbiki no Kobuta Kōgeki" (Japanese: 必殺!三匹の子ぶた攻撃)	28 January 1994
Marin transfers to the same school as Chacha to get closer to Riiya but ends up in a different class. Yakko gives Marin a love potion which makes anyone who drinks the potion fall in love with her. Through a series of accidents, the potion is mixed in with the school lunch, causing everyone in the Banana Class to fall in love with Marin.
5	"A Date with Kyū-chan"; Transliteration: "Kyū-chan to Dēto" (Japanese: きゅーちゃんとデート)	4 February 1994
The school goes camping with Marin tricking Chacha into searching for more firewood in the forest. Marine then mixes up the signs, causing Chacha to become lost. She manages to get back home safely with Seravy's help, but ends up being kidnapped, along with Marin, by a vampire who lives in a castle in the forest. They pretend to want to go on a date with the vampire while looking for a way to escape.
6	"Babies' Magic Is Weaker"; Transliteration: "Akachan wa Mahō ga Oheta" (Japanese: 赤ちゃんは魔法がお下手)	11 February 1994
The twin witches Lan Lan and Kan Kan transform Chacha, Shiine, and Riiya into babies and Seravy and Dorothy into children. Later, they try to defeat Seravy in his newly weakened state in order to take the children to the Daimaō.
7	"Cold Explosion! The Teacher is a Snow Woman"; Transliteration: "Samusa Bakuhatsu! Sensei wa Yuki Onna" (Japanese: 寒さ爆発!先生は雪女)	18 February 1994
Mr. Rascal is hit by a truck and cannot make it to school, so a teacher named Ms. Oyuki is asked to substitute in his classroom. Due to being a yuki-onna, she creates a blizzard whenever she is frustrated or not sure of herself. Soon, the whole classroom is transported to Ms. Oyuki's mental dimension where they have to find a way back home. An evil mole is sent by Sorges tries to capture Chacha, but Ms. Oyuki intervenes just in time in order to protect her students.
8	"My Cake is the Best"; Transliteration: "Watashi no Kēki wa Ichiban Zansu" (Japanese: 私のケーキは一番ざんす)	25 February 1994
As Riiya's grandpa stops by after getting lost in the woods, the principal pities him and gives him all of the school lunches to eat, leaving everyone at school to starve. While Riiya, Chacha, and Shiine are walking through the woods, they stumble across a house that has a delightful smell of cookies. However, the witch who lives there was sent by Sorges to eliminate Chacha. She invites them in and lets them eat her cakes, which taste terrible. Feeling insulted, she challenges Chacha to a baking duel: if Chacha can make a better cake than her, the witch will release her and her friends. With a little help from Seravy, Chacha makes a cake that tastes better than the witch, but she tries to kill Chacha anyway, saying nobody should be a better baker than her. Chacha transforms into the Magical Princess and defeats her.
9	"Launch! Nyandaber Z"; Transliteration: "Hasshin! Nyandabā Zeddo" (Japanese: 発進!ニャンダバーZ)	4 March 1994
Marin invites Riiya to her Hinamatsuri party and Chacha asks Seravy if she can throw one too. However, Dorothy tells Chacha that she needs the dolls to celebrate Hinamatsuri and the dolls Seravy owns are for Boy's Day. Feeling tricked, Chacha runs away with Riiya and Shiine following. They stumble across man named Mikeneko who models his invention after cats. He invites them into his crazy home and they are nearly killed by his inventions because he was sent by Sorges to kill Chacha. After all his attempts at killing them fail, he unleashes a giant cat robot. Chacha transforms into the Magical Princess and defeats him. Together with Hinamatsuri dolls, the trio are hungry shortly after they defeat him until a feast of luxurious food arrives. This is Seravy's way of apologizing to Chacha about what had happened earlier and Chacha forgives him.
10	"Kyū-chan Strikes Back!"; Transliteration: "Kyū-chan no Gyakushū!" (Japanese: きゅーちゃんの逆襲!)	11 March 1994
After being defeated the first time by Chacha and her friends, Kyū-chan has trained himself to overcome his weaknesses as a vampire. Sorges gives him another chance to defeat Chacha, and begins by having his bats kidnap Riiya while he is on the way home from school with Chacha and Shiine, with Marin chasing behind them. Chacha and Shiine try to rescue Riiya but are instead knocked into a fast-moving river just as Marin catches up. Thinking that Riiya has fallen into the river too, she summons a seashell boat and heads down the river searching for him. Upon rescuing Riiya tied up in a shooting gallery, Kyū-chan appears and puts him into a large plastic container so the three friends cannot activate the magical items which allow Chacha to transform. Eventually, they are able to get Riiya out of the plastic container with the inadvertent help of Marin, and Chacha is able to active the magical items and defeat Kyū-chan.
11	"Decide!? Sushi Champion"; Transliteration: "Kettei!? Sushi Chanpion" (Japanese: 決定！？すしチャンピオン)	18 March 1994
On the annual school festival, Sorges sends Sushi, an evil sushi chef, to destroy Chacha. Riiya's giant grandfather shows up and offers to make sushi for everyone, with Riiya telling everyone what a good sushi chef he is. However, he is out of everything except egg. Marin summons all kinds of seafood and Riiya's grandfather makes a lot of giant sushi for everyone and Marin goes back to her class. In the hallway, she is attacked by Sushi and made into a giant makizushi. Chacha finds her and Sushi is about to attack her but Seravy arrives and offers to make sushi for everyone. It turns out that Seravy is an excellent sushi chef and everyone loves his sushi. Sushi asks Seravy to teach him his techniques. After some discussion, Seravy decides to teach him, and puts him through a lot of seemingly pointless exercises. After he masters Seravy's sushi technique, he attacks Chacha and her friends but loses after being tricked by Seravy into letting them go. The Daimaō is not happy with Sorges.
12	"Orin-chan's First Love"; Transliteration: "Orin-chan no Hatsukoi" (Japanese: お鈴ちゃんの初恋)	25 March 1994
Orin is caught sleeping in class (on the ceiling, no less) and falls onto Shiine when Mr. Rascal throws chalk at her to wake her up. When she looks up at Shiine after the untangle themselves, she becomes smitten with him but does not know what the feelings are. meanwhile, Sorges has plans to defeat Chacha by using the cursed blade Kōtetsu. Orin follows Chacha and company home, and they end up visiting her house and staying for dinner after being introduced to the traps in the ninja house. The next day, Orin's grandfather receives an unexpected delivery: the cursed blade Kōtetsu. He becomes possessed by the evil aura of the blade and sets out to destroy Chacha. However, his back is weak and he cannot complete his mission. When Chacha and friends are trying to help him as he has collapsed on the ground, Orin comes upon them and misinterprets their actions and decides to finish her grandfather's work by defeating by summoning a giant toad. The trio is chased to the school by Orin and her toad, with her grandfather in pursuit. He is tricked by Seravy into dropping the sword, which loses its hold over him. However, the sword has a mind of its own and moves of its own accord toward the toad, which picks it up with its tongue and becomes possessed in the process. It begins attacking everyone until Chacha and her friends release the Magical Princess Holy Up power and defeat the sword.
13	"Do Your Best, House-sitter!"; Transliteration: "Ganbare Orusuban!" (Japanese: がんばれ お留守番!)	1 April 1994
Seravy and Dorothy go to a sale at a magic shop in a distant town, and Chacha is left to watch the house while they are gone. She promises to not talk to strangers, to not play with fire, and to not wreck the house, though she causes a big hole in the house soon after Seravy leaves by accidentally summoning a barbecued sandal instead of a barbecued pig. The Daimaō knows Seravy will be gone and has Sorges send a kitsune to get rid go Chacha while Seravy is gone. The kitsune's first attempt is to get Chacha to eat a poisoned banana. It tries to sell the bananas to them, but they do not have any money so it offers Chacha one for free. When Riiya tries to eat the banana, Marin appears out of nowhere and kicks the kitsune out of the house. The kitsune changes plan and comes back trying to get into the house by pretending to be wanting Seravy to look for his wallet. Yakko shows up and punches him out of the house. She thinks Chacha is hiding Seravy and challenges. Eventually the kitsune gets into the house by pretending to be a handyman who can fix all the damage done to the house, after which he changes into a giant monster and begins attacking them. Chacha and her friends defeat the monster in the normal way, but destroy the entire house in the process. Seravy comes home and is disappointed that Chacha did not follow directions but is happy everyone is safe.
14	"The Dark Lord is Angry"; Transliteration: "Daimaō-sama wa Oikari Degesu" (Japanese: 大魔王様はお怒りでゲス)	8 April 1994
Recalling past events, the Daimaō is questioning Sorges as to why he has not yet defeated Chacha, and Sorges explains all of his efforts so far. The episode ends with the Daimaō ordering Sorges to stop playing around and to defeat Chacha or he will be beheaded. As Chacha is coming home from school, Seravy is peering into his crystal ball and commenting on how he can feel the dark energy spreading everywhere.
15	"Birth! Franken-chan"; Transliteration: "Tanjō! Furanken-chan" (Japanese: 誕生！フランケンちゃん)	15 April 1994
The Daimaō is tired of Sorges' failures and has Professor Hawking implement a plan for defeating Chacha. He leaves a large egg on the path to the school where Chacha and her friends will find it. She takes the egg home and hatches Franken-chan out of it. The first person he sees is Chacha, and he imprints on her as his mother. Chacha begins raising him, even taking him to school. However, Professor Hawking has other plans, and causes Franken-chan to transform into a maonster who begins attacking Chacha and the other students. Riiya's grandfather comes to the school to help out, but even he is no match for Franken-chan's strength. Chacha transforms into the Magical Princess, but can not bring herself to shoot Franken-chan until Seravy explains that only a mother's love can help him. After the battle, Riiya's grandfather invites Franken-chan to work with him as a lumberjack.
16	"Umibōzu's Little Sister Appears!"; Transliteration: "Deta! Umibōzu no Imōto" (Japanese: 出た!海坊主の妹)	22 April 1994
The school is on a trip to the beach. Unbeknownst to them, the area is infested with one-eyed jellyfish, and Riiya and Shiine get stung. The only hope to save them is an herb from down the coast, but the inlet where the herb is found is guarded by a horrible monster. Chacha, Orin, Marin, and Mr. Rascal go to the inlet to get the herb, but they are discovered by the monster, who turns out to be Umibōko, the younger sister of Umibōzu, Marin's would-be boyfriend. She is out for revenge on Marin for rejecting Umibōzu, but Marin disappeared into the cave while the monster was preoccupied with the others. After she gathers the herb, Marin heads back to find Riiya, but the monster notices her and attacks, causing her to drop all of the herbs into the ocean. Just as Umibōko is about to kill both Chacha and Marin, Umibōzu appears and convinces his sister to leave them alone and leave with him. This does not please the one-eyed jellyfish, who merge into the Evil King Jellyfish and begin attacking Chacha and her friends. Marin gets knocked into the water and finds one of the herbs. Just as Chacha is about to be electrocuted by the Evil King Jellyfish, Shiine and Riiya receive the herb and are cured. Chacha then defeats the Evil King Jellyfish and the episode ends with Chacha and her friends singing by the ocean.
17	"Nyandaber Returns"; Transliteration: "Kaettekita Nyandabā" (Japanese: 帰ってきたニャンダバー)	29 April 1994
Riiya is complaining about his brothers and how they steal his food, but while Chacha feels bad for him, Shiine says it is typical of werewolves. Sorges has a new plan involving Dr. Mikeneko, and his brothers and sister who have offered to help him in his plan to make a new Nyandaber to fight Chacha. Upon being chased through the forest by robot horses and hippos, they are tricked into a small dead end canyon where they are attacked by Dr. Mikeneko and his family. After Chacha and her friends beat the first attack, Dr. Mikeneko summons the five parts of his new improved Nyandaber ZZ. Chacha and her friends are impressed by the new machine until it begins attacking them. In the middle of the attack, Seravy shows up in disguise, and Mikeneko's siblings begin fighting with each other for a brief time. They resolve their differences, though and attack Chacha and her friends. She transforms into the Magical Princess and defeats Nyandaber ZZ.
18	"Zombie Warning! Urara Academy"; Transliteration: "Zonbi Keihō! Urara Gakuen" (Japanese: ゾンビ警報!うらら学園)	6 May 1994
The Daimaō is beginning to be tired of Sorges' failures, but Sorges has a new plan he believes will not fail: he will send Cupid Fell (a demonic version of Cupid who looks like a minotaur) to the school to turn everyone into zombies. Chacha and her friends are playing hide-and-seek when they eventually end up at a local shrine dedicated to Cupid. Shiine is captured by Cupid Fell while trying to find a place to hide from Orin. He offers to take care of Shiine's infatuation with Chacha if he allows Cupid Fell to borrow his body so he can fire his tiny bow and arrow more effectively. After attempting several times to hit Chacha with Cupid Fell's arrows, Shiine's friend notice there is something weird going on and cause Cupid Fell to come back out of Shiine. Unfortunately, the demon tricks Riiya and possesses him instead. However, Riiya's clumsiness makes it impossible for him to hit Chacha with an arrow so he possesses Mr. Rascal. The principal is onto him, however, and causes him to leave Rascal after she protects the students from his arrows. Cupid Fell then turns all the trees and bushes in the schoolyard into zombies who then attack Chacha and her friends. Orin is able to shield them from Cupid Fells attacks with a smoke screen long enough for Chacha to change into the Magical Princess and defeat the demon, though it took more effort than in the past.
19	"Horror! Dorothy's Little Sister?"; Transliteration: "Kyōfu! Doroshī no Imōto?" (Japanese: 恐怖!どろしーの妹?)	13 May 1994
As Dorothy is about to go shopping, but Seravy tricks her into watching Chacha and friends while he runs some errands. While they are out shopping for food, Riiya is hit by a fancy car which turns out to be owned by Doris, Dorothy's younger sister. She bribes everyone to come have a sumptuous feast prepared by her best chef, but her real plan is to trap Dorothy and get Seravy all to herself. After trapping Dorothy, she dresses like her older sister and tries to trick Chacha and her friends, but Riiya can tell it is Doris by her smell. She then tries to bribe them into letting her take Dorothy's place, but they won't be bribed. Suddenly, Dorothy appears, having broken out of the wizard prison Doris constructed. However, it is actually Seravy disguised as Dorothy, which makes Doris very happy. Seravy runs away, but Doris chases after him, asking why he does not want her around. It turns out Doris is actually a man (Dorothy's brother), who is in love with Seravy. As Doris is chasing Seravy, Chacha and friends are attacked by Battle Barber, one of Sorges' henchmen. Chacha transforms into the Magical Princess and defeats the demon barber. Everyone goes home, forgetting that Dorothy is still trapped in the dungeon.
20	"The Challenge of the Phantom Thief, Nezumi Kid"; Transliteration: "Kaitō Nezumi Kiddo no Chōsen" (Japanese: 怪盗ネズミキッドの挑戦)	20 May 1994
The Daimaō orders Sorges to defeat Chacha again, and Sorges asks why he is so interested in Chacha, but gets no answer. Meanwhile, Chacha and her classmates are graduating, but the Nezumi Kid has announced his intention to steal the Graduation Stamp, thereby preventing the students from graduating. It turns out that Nezumi Kid attended the school the same year as Seravy and Dorothy, and left the school after losing a disguise contest to Seravy. Chacha and her friends, along with Mr. Rascal and the principal, are guarding the stampe when Seravy stops by disguised as a "just passing by" master detective (and assistant, played by Elizabeth). Later, he drops by again only to have a second "just passing by" detective come in, and both look the same. The students are able to determine the fake (Nezumi Kid) as he does not have an assistant, but the lights get turned off. After they come back on, there are two Mr. Rascals and Seravy is gone. The Nezumi Kid is able to trick the kids into believing he is the real Mr. Rascal, and escape with the stamp as Chacha and her friends realize their mistake and begin chasing him. While attempting to grab the stamp, Orin gets trapped in a bag designed to tighten as she struggles more. Seravy (still disguised as the detective) then stops Nezumi Kid from running and tells Chacha, Shiine, and Riiya to take care of Nezumi Kid. Nezumi Kid tosses the stamp up into the air where Sorges is waiting in a helicopter, but Shiine summons a cannon and shoots it down. Nezumi Kid has other ideas and sends a duplicating robot after them which duplicates whenever it is attacked. The more they try to destroy the robots, the more those are created. Chacha summons a giant cat statue and smashes them all, but they merge into a giant rat robot which then attacks. Chacha transforms into the Magical Princess, being only briefly interrupted by Marin, and defeats the robot. However, the stamp has been taken away by Sorges. His damaged helicopter crashes into the mountains and the episode ends.
21	"The Perilous Outdoor Bath"; Transliteration: "Kiken ga Ippai Rotenburo" (Japanese: 危険がいっぱい露天風呂)	27 May 1994
Chacha and her friends, along with Mr. Rascal and the Principal, discover the helicopter wreckage in the mountains, but Sorges and the stamp are gone. They head off into the forest after Sorges and the stamp after Riiya sniffs out the trail. Meanwhile, Sorges is relaxing in the nearby onsen. He tells the Daimaō he will return with the stamp as soon as he is healed. The kids are still wandering around trying to relocate the trail as Riiya suddenly lost track of it. It turns out they are near the onsen and the sulfur smell has masked the scent. Seravy and Dorothy are on their way to Gokuraku Onsen and run into Chacha and her friends and they all decide to go to the onsen, too. It turns out the onsen is a mixed-bath onsen, so everyone bathes together. Shiine and Riiya str embarrassed by this until they find out all the girls and Dorothy are wearing swimsuits. While in the bath, they meet Sorges, but none of them know who he is since they've never seen him up close. As Sorges is all bandaged up, they wish him a quick healing due to the sulfurous waters as they go to their rooms for the night. Sorges then bribes Beppu, the owner of the inn, into getting rid of Chacha. Although Seravy did not order one, Beppu leads them to a room prepared with a feast, and Chacha and her friends begin eating while Dorothy and Seravy go outside to take in the night views. Seravy calls everyone to come look at the Moon right before Beppu causes the ceiling to crash down on the table where they were just eating. The ceiling keeps going, though, and also crushes Sorges in the room just below them. Beppu then sends the kids on a bungee basket ride, then causes the water below them to begin boiling. Before they can fall in, they are able to escape, but Beppu grabs Marin and Orin and carries them off. The others give chase and eventually catch up, but Beppu traps them and continues to attack, even turning into a giant clay statue and pursuing them. While they are trying to escape Riiya realizes his nose has gotten accustomed to the smell of the onsen and he can now smell the stamp and Sorges. Chacha changes into the Magical Princess and defeats Beppu. Defeating Beppu causes the area to become very seismically active and everyone is trying to get away while Chacha, Shiine, and Riiya are hunting for the stamp. Sorges drops the stamp and it is sent high into the sky by an eruption.
22	"Surprise! First Experience with Being a Sacrifice"; Transliteration: "Bikkuri! Ikenie Shōtaiken" (Japanese: びっくり!いけにえ初体験)	3 June 1994
Mr. Rascal and the Principal are back at the school while Chacha and friends continue searching for the Graduation Stamp. Sorges is consulting with his subordinate, Oroshi, to find out if it had seen where the stamp went. Chacha and her friends are traveling through a wasteland and are getting very thirsty. Chacha summons a giant can of juice, but not even Riiya can open it. Marin appears and summons water, but it is salt water and causes them to become more thirsty. Chacha's magical ring and amulet begin glowing and the larger gems detaches itself and begins leading them across the wilderness where they find an apparently deserted village. The village is not actually deserted, and the villagers welcome them with a feast, but it is interrupted with one of the village children saying he is hungry. The villagers then tell Chacha and friends about Oroshi, an eight-headed hydra, which has damaged their fields and the village, and the only way to appease the hydra is to offer a maiden as a sacrifice. The villagers state they want one of the two girls in the group (Marin or Chacha) as that sacrifice. The two girls aren't very supportive of the idea, but the villagers beg them and bring in the sacrificial bier which happens to have the Graduation Stamp used as a decoration. Chacha and friends decide to go through with it and defeat Oroshi so they can take the stamp and graduate. Chacha is dressed as the maiden sacrifice, and the villagers explain they need two sacrifices and Marin will be the second. The bier is taken to the sacrificial spot and Oroshi appears with Sorges riding one of the heads. Chacha and Marin cause Oroshi to get drunk, but Sorges sobers the hydra. As the hydra grabs Chacha, Marin grabs the stamp and runs away with it and finds Riiya and Shiine on their way to rescue Chacha. After a brief fight, Chacha transforms and defeats Oroshi. Back at the school, everyone is happy the stamp is back. However, Chacha and friends were not aware there was still a week of studying for the final exam before they graduated.
23	"Fight! Graduation Exam"; Transliteration: "Tatakae! Sotsugyō Shiken" (Japanese: 戦え!卒業試験)	10 June 1994
Chacha is excited to take the exam until Dorothy causes her and Riiya to become depressed over the possibility they could fail. Seravy cheers them up, though and they head off to the school excited again. The Daimaō is extremely displeased at all of SOrges' failures, but Sorges assures him he will personally deal with the issue. The Principal has just finished writing the final exam when Sorges appears and states it is too easy. He tells her to allow him to administer the exam, and Mr. Rascal bursts in stating he thinks that would be a fine idea as he thinks the exam should be difficult. Sorges goes into the classroom to administer the exam and summons a small mountain with a flag on top. He says that, after the written exam, anyone who reaches the top of the mountain passes. His henchmen, Yordas and Haideyansu, bring in the written exam and give Chacha an ensorcelled exam which switches the answers written on it after a few minutes. However, Yakko pretends to break Chacha's pencil twice and gives her a pencil which magically changes the answers written with it, effectively cancelling out Sorges' plan. After everyone passes the written exam, everyone moves to the small mountain outside and begins by swimming across a lake to get to it. Marin tries to stop her by summoning a giant clam, but Chacha escapes by summoning a weird monster (caused by her unintelligible words spoken underwater). Sorges has Yordas and Haideyansu try to stop Chacha using a giant octopus robot, but it gets stuck when Yakko freezes the lake. After battling giant iron balls, then a monster brought to life from merging the balls with Yordas and Haideyansu, Chacha and her friends are trapped by the monster, which causes her to transform. She then defeats the monster and everyone makes it to the goal. Sorges tries to blame his failure on Yordas and Haideyansu, but the Daimaō is not pleased.
24	"I'm the Legendary Princess?"; Transliteration: "Watashi ga Densetsu Ōjo-sama?" (Japanese: 私が伝説の王女様?)	17 June 1994
Everyone is happy during the graduation ceremony. Chacha is chosen to receive the diploma for her class. After summoning a lit hotel instead of glowing fireflies, everyone breaks down in tears because they are graduating and going their separate ways. When Chacha, Seravy, Riiya, Shiine, Dorothy, and Riiya's grandfather are almost back to Seravy's house, Dorothy summons her castle to be next door to it so Shiine does not have to travel far to see Chacha, but Seravy sends the castle back where it was. They then decide to have a party instead. When the arrive at the house, they unexpectedly find a feast all prepared by Yakko, who is ready to move in with her beloved Seravy. Yakko confesses her plan to become Seravy's student. and then his bride. Seravy leaves the room, asking Chacha to take care of Yakko for him. Chacha begins by having Yakko try to pass a test to see if she can become Seravy's student. The Daimaō is not pleased with Sorges, but in the middle of disciplining him, a falcon flies into the room and delivers a message: Access is coming back. Sorges goes off to clean the castle and discovers a hidden room full of extremely lifelike statues, including one of the previous king and queen. The Daimaō walks up behind him and explains that it is so lifelike because it really is the previous king and queen. Chacha begins the quiz show to test Yakko and see if she can become Seravy's apprentice by seeing how much she knows about him. The Daimaō is not happy Sorges has discovered his secret and tells him he must now die. Sorges is chased to the entrance of the castle, but the Daimaō is unable to chase him further as Genius, the former king (and Chacha's grandfather), created a barrier to keep the Daimaō from ever being able to leave the castle. Sorges flees and is pursued by Yordas and Haideyansu, who are also trying to kill him so they can take his place. Sorges escapes them and crashes into Chach's quiz show set, where he pleads for help from Seravy as Haideyansu arrives and attacks after transforming into a Tyrannosaur. Yakko tries to defeat it, but accidentally makes it larger, so she passes out from fright. Chacha changes into the Magical Princess and defeats it, and Sorges thanks her by telling her she is the rightful heir to the kingdom. Yakko wakes up to find a formidable man on a horse in front of her on a hill overlooking Seravy's house.
25	"Why Oh Why! The Arrow Is Worn Out"; Transliteration: "Naze Naze! Arō Yabureru" (Japanese: なぜなぜ!アロー破れる)	24 June 1994
Chacha is still learning to accept the fact that she is a princess. Seravy starts by telling everyone he used to be captain of the palace guard, and that a great war had been fought between the demons and the people of the land. A Magical Princess had rallied the people of the land from certain defeat and driven the demons to exile on an island far to the north by using three magical weapons. She had formed a magical barrier around the island which prevented the demons from escaping. The Magical Princess became the first queen of the land. While the story is being told, Yordas is discovered hiding outside the window and plotting to capture Sorges. Riiya chases after him, with Chacha and Shiine right behind him. They lose him in the forest and split up to try to find him. Yordas traps Shiine using a photo of Chacha in a swimsuit, then hypnotizing him into becoming a rebel by pointing out the Chacha seems to like Riiya better. Riiya returns to Seravy's house before the others looking like he is possessed and sporting a new rebellious attitude. Seravy continues the story by explaining that a powerful demon was able to break through the barrier and attack the castle where he turned the king and queen into a statue. Chacha becomes emotional when she learns that she has a mother and father. Seravy explains that even King Genius couldn't defeat the Daimaō, so they should be careful to not underestimate his power. Seravy was charged to take care of the baby Princess Chacha and was given the Princess Medallion which allows Chacha to transform into the Magical Princess. King Genius then trapped the Daimaō inside the castle right before the Daimaō finished transforming King Genius into a jewel. This jewel was placed into the Princess Medallion. The only way for Chacha to free her parents and King Genius is to defeat the Daimaō. Access has now found out where Chacha and Seravy live Meanwhile, Shiine has begun dressing like a bōsōzoku and begins fighting with Riiya. Yordas appears and states this was his purpose all along: to make it so Chacha could not transform into the Magical Princess because the three were not getting along. He transforms into a giant crab, but finds he can not move forward to attack Chacha (since crabs walk sideways). Haideyansu appears and changes into a giant lobster which Yordas can ride so he can move forward. Chacha tries to transform into the Magical Princess, but Shiine does not cooperate, saying he wants to be first after Chacha instead of Riiya. After Riiya gets mad tells Shiine it has always been the three of them working together, Shiine snaps out of his rebellious phase and Chacha transforms and defeats the two henchmen. Sorges tells Chacha to heal the two henchmen's hearts with her arrow, but Access appears and blocks both of her attempts. He rides off as Seravy and Dorothy fly up. Seravy tells her she must find the Phoenix Sword in order to be able to rescue her parents. Shiine and Riiya tell her they will come along with her as she searches for it.
26	"Get Out of the Way, Love's Obstruction"; Transliteration: "Doke Doke Koi no Ojamamushi" (Japanese: どけどけ恋のおじゃま虫)	1 July 1994
Chacha and her friends are looking for the Phoenix, and Seravy leaves on an errand. While he is gone, Yakko drops by to spend some time with her beloved, not realizing he is not there. Flashbacks are used to show Yakko's infatuation with Seravy. Then Marin shows up looking for Riiya, but he is off in the woods looking for clues about the Phoenix. Flashbacks are used to show when Marin met Riiya. Marin and Yakko continue to reminisce about how Chacha is always foiling their plans for getting in the Riiya and Seravy (respectively) while Chacha is listening and nodding off to sleep. After she falls asleep, Yakko and Marin leave, and Seravy comes home shortly afterward.
27	"The Fiery Scene of Chacha's Power"; Transliteration: "Kajiba no Chacha Pawā" (Japanese: 火事場のチャチャパワー)	8 July 1994
Access is talking to Haideyansu and Yordas and planning his strategy against Chacha. The Beauty Selene Arrow is no longer always effective, and Chacha and her friends are off to seek the Phoenix Sword. They head to Mount Bōbō, where they've heard a phoenix lives, in the hope that there may be some connection to the sword. When they get there, they discover the entire mountain is rich in petroleum deposits and is very flammable. Seravy and Dorothy show up in disguise and give a presentation on fire safety, after which the trio continues on their way up the mountain. After looking around for a while, they find a caterpillar who likes to eat fireworks, but it offers no help, stating it has never heard of any phoenix. After they leave, Haideyansu and Yordas offer a deal to the caterpillar if it helps them defeat Chacha, so it heads after them. Once it catches up it begins setting the entire mountain on fire with its fireworks breath. It then spins a cocoon to protect itself from the fire, but Haideyansu and Yordas roll the cocoon into the fire. This causes the caterpillar to become a Phoenix Moth and it begins attacking Haideyansu and Yordas, as well as Chacha and her friends. Eventually, though, Chacha defeats it with her Beauty Selene Arrow, causing all the fire on the mountain to disappear and be replaced with beautiful flowers. They are sad there was no phoenix on the mountain, but they will keep looking for the sword.
28	"Phoenix Pond Explorers"; Transliteration: "Fushichō no Numa Tankentai" (Japanese: 不死鳥の沼探検隊)	15 July 1994
Chacha, Seravy, Shiine, and Riiya are eating breakfast and discussing what happened at Mount Bōbō. Seravy, after being reminded by Elizabeth, mentions that he has heard of a bird which resurrects itself every thousand years in an area call the Three Ponds. Chacha and her two friends discuss how to get there while ignoring Seravy's speech about how there are many dangers and it won't be easy. Meanwhile, Haideyansu and Yordas volunteer to stop Chacha and her friends in order to be accepted by the Daimaō. Chacha, Riiya, and Shiine are on their way toward the Three Ponds when they find a dango and tea house run by Mr. Rascal and Principal Urara. Since everyone graduated, they've been running the small business until more students enroll. It turns out that Marin, Yakko, and Orin are also working there, each for their own reasons. Haideyansu and Yordas are also working there, and they try to slip something into Chacha's water, but Mr. Rascal inadvertently prevents them from giving her the water and demands that they only serve tea as they are in a tea house. After receiving their tea, the trio explains they are on the way to the Three Ponds to try finding the phoenix. Mr. Rascal and the Principal tell them of the legend: that when the three ponds turn black, green, and red, the bird resurrects, but that the forest around the ponds is dangerous and apparently no one who goes there ever returns. Marin and Orin volunteer to go with them, but Yakko stays behind to try to get Seravy while Chacha is gone. Haideyansu and Yordas also sneak off after Chacha. After walking through a creepy forest, the group finds the three ponds. Marin turns one of the ponds black by summoning an octopus and having it spray ink into the pond. Orin uses her ninja skills to known a tree top into one of the ponds, using the leaves to turn it green. Chacha tries a few times to turn the pond red, but only succeeds accidentally when Haideyansu and Yordas try to pull her into the third pond but grab Marine instead. Everyone works together to pull Marine out of the pond (thanks to Riiya's great strength), and Haideyansu and Yordas are thrown into a tree, knocking it down and letting the sunset through the trees, coloring the pond red. The large stone marker in the middle of the three ponds begins glowing and cracking, then crumbling to the ground. A large frog rises from the dust, asking who summoned it. It turns out to be a frog that can read minds (this is a play on words with the pronunciation of "phoenix resurrection" in Japanese). It turns out it is the Evil Frog King, Tori, from the demon world, and he begins attacking the group. He easily defeats everyone as he can read their minds. He has trouble reading Chacha's mind, though, and begins attacking her. The Frog King reads their minds while Chacha transforms, and he recites all the words they say during the transformation. Even so, the Magical Princess is able to seal him back inside the stone marker. Haideyansu and Yordas escape after seeing their plans foiled. They did not find the Phoenix Sword, though.
29	"Welcome to the Home of the Phoenix!"; Transliteration: "Yōkoso! Fushichō no Sato e" (Japanese: ようこそ!不死鳥の里へ)	22 July 1994
Chacha and friends are at Chacha's home considering their next move. Seravy is considering the local supermarket ads to determine what to have for dinner when he finds an ad for "The Home of the Phoenix", a new development nearby. Haideyansu and Yordas are considering their next move against Chacha. Chacha and her friends go to the Home of the Phoenix only to find it is a just a tourist attraction, and Chacha and Riiya spend all their money buying cute trinkets and snacks. They run into a woman who is familiar with the legend of the phoenix, and she takes them to a beach which used to attract the phoenix. However, since the Daimaō came to power, the river flowing from the castle is full of filthy, polluted water which has made the beach dirty and covered in garbage. The phoenix no longer comes because of that. Haideyansu and Yordas keep trying to shoot Chacha with an arrow, but people keep getting in the way. The savvy shop owner sells them a poorly drawn map to where a phoenix is supposedly buried. As they are searching, Haideyansu and Yordas try a third time to shoot Chacha, but the arrow flies astray and strikes a tree which happens to be a demonic tree. They apologize and convince it to work for them. Meanwhile, Chacha and friends are searching for the phoenix, and after a little help from Seravy (dressed as a just-passing compass), they determine where to dig and find a treasure chest. Just as they are about to open it, the demonic tree attacks them. The tree is about to defeat them when Chacha's pendant begins to glow, causing the demonic tree to release them. Chacha transforms into the Magical Princess and defeats the tree despite everything it throws at her. After the tree disappears, the store owner runs up and congratulates them on finding the chest. They open it and find a phoenix feather. The shop owner tells them the feather will show them the way to go if they really want to find the phoenix and release the feather in the wind. They release the feather and it draws a picture of a mountain and then flies off, showing them which way to go.
30	"This Is the Rumored Wing Kris"; Transliteration: "Kore ga Uwasa no Uingu Kurisu" (Japanese: これが噂の不死鳥の剣(ウイングクリス))	29 July 1994
Haideyansu and Yordas tell the Daimaō that they've found the phoenix: it is at Mount Arigatō. They leave to find the phoenix sword there, and the Daimaō tells Access to not worry as Gandar will defeat Chacha if Haideyansu and Yordas can not do it. Chacha and her friends are hiking through the woods to find the mountain when they fall into a large hole. After climbing out, they notice there are large holes all over the area, including a fairly new one next to a deserted village. A small, very round bird comes up to them while they are looking at the newest hole and Shiine transforms into a bird so he can understand it. Apparently a rock giant, Gandar, has gathered up all the birds in the area so he can try to fly, but he has not been successful yet. All the villagers fled after he kept crashing into the ground nearby. Haideyansu and Yordas find Gandar in a large cave full of thousands of imprisoned birds. Meanwhile, Chacha and her friends are climbing the mountain, but the small round bird is having trouble keeping up. Shiine and Riiya suggest they leave the bird behind, but Chacha refuses to do so. She also names the bird "Piisuke" because it is pink and says, "Pii, pii, pii" all the time. Chacha decides to teach Piisuke how to fly, but does not have any luck. Shiine tries to help, but only scares Piisuke and causing Riiya to almost eat Piisuke. The rock giant flies out of the mountain using all the birds, thanks to help from Haideyansu and Yordas, but Shiine changes into a pair of giant shears and Riiya throws them at the cords between the rock giant, causing it to fall to the earth. Chacha transforms and attacks the rock giant with the Beauty Selene Arrow, but the rock giant deflects or absorbs the shots until one causes a blinding light and it appears to be defeated. However, it then grabs the Magical Princess, Shiine, and Riiya with electrified tendrils, shocking them repeatedly. Piisuke gets upset and attacks the rock giant, flying up its nose and causing it to sneeze, making the tendrils release the Magical Princess and her friends. The rock giant then tries to step on them, and they are about to be crushed when Piisuke gets made and a bright lights expands out from it, knocking the giant over as Piisuke transforms into the phoenix. Piisuke then flies past the rock giant and lands on the Magical Princess' hand, transforming into the Wing Kris when she says, "Lightning Feather, Skill Up!". She uses it to defeat the rock giant. The Daimaō then tells Access it is his turn to go after Chacha.
31	"Lots of Training!"; Transliteration: "Tokkun ga Ippai!" (Japanese: 特訓がいっぱい!)	5 August 1994
The opening animation changes with this episode, though the opening theme song remains the same. Chacha, Riiya, and Shiine explain to Seravy and Dorothy what happened with the rock giant and Piisuke. Meanwhile, the Daimaō sends Access to defeat Chacha at any cost, and send Haideyansu and Yordas to keep an eye on Access ad report on his actions. Seravy tells Chacha they need to try out her strength with the Phoenix Sword (Wing Kris). She summons the phoenix using the words "Saint Fairy Navigation" while firing a Beauty Selene Arrow. She attacks the monster summoned by Seravy only to find out it is a balloon which easily dodges her first attack. The Magical Princess tries again, but the Wing Kris Burning Flash attack gets out of control, chasing Riiya and Shiine and burning Dorothy. Seravy tells Chacha she'll need to practice more in order to master the sword. They go to the school in order to have their teachers help train them. After Mr. Rascal offers to help train them, they determine he knows nothing about swords and go to visit Orin where her grandfather offers to teach Chacha what she needs to know. While they trained hard, they did not learn too much in the way of actual sword fighting. After leaving Orin's home, while singing about defeating the Daimaō, they run into Access. He easily defeats Riiya and Shiine and goes after Chacha next. After Chacha and her friends try multiple things to distract Access, Chacha transforms and summons the Phoenix Sword, but Access knocks it out of her hands with one strike. Before killing them, Access tells them who he is, and Riiya and Shiine introduce themselves as well. When Shiine says who he is, Access pauses in surprise long enough for Chacha to summon her will to protect them. The Phoenix Sword leaps into her hands and she now understands how to control its power. She attacks access and drives him to the edge of a cliff. He tells them he'll come and fight them another day, summons his horse and rides off. Haideyansu and Yordas report back to the Daimaō what happened, and Chacha and friends tell Seravy and Dorothy all about their encounter.
32	"Dangerous Love Triangle"; Transliteration: "Kiken na Koi no Toraianguru" (Japanese: 危険な恋のトライアングル)	12 August 1994
Chacha and friends are telling the story of their latest encounter with Access over and over to Seravy. Meanwhile, Access tells the Daimaō that he can know use all of his skills to fight Chacha now that she has mastered the Phoenix Sword and become a worthy opponent. After he disappears, the Daimaō summons a suit of cursed armor which he intends to send after Chacha. Dorothy is in her castle worrying about a sudden weight gain when Access comes in and greets her. When Shiine arrives home for lunch, he sees Access and Dorothy walk out of the castle together, but he can not hear what they are saying. Access is telling Dorothy that he left his son with her, and Dorothy confirms that the Shiine who was with Chacha is his son. When Dorothy asks him if he still loves his son, Shiine overhears part of the conversation and instead thinks Dorothy is asking Access if he loves her. Hoping to avoid an imagined love triangle between Seravy, Access, and Dorothy, Shiine heads off to speak with Seravy before Dorothy can finish making lunch. Seravy tells Shiine that he loves Dorothy. Shiine completely misunderstands (due to his previous misunderstanding) and heads home to ask Dorothy how she feels about Seravy. He leaves before he can take the cake Seravy was making for Dorothy, so Seravy heads off after him and leaves Chacha and Riiya to watch the house. As they are discussing what the Daimaō would be like, the cursed armor attacks them. Seravy arrives just as Shiine is getting ready to ask Dorothy what she thinks of Seravy. He tells Shiine that he thinks Chacha is being attacked by evil cursed armor, and Shiine leaves. Riiya throws a giant boulder at the armor, but it does not seem to affect it. The cursed armor chases them up the mountain and through a lake before Shiine finally arrives to help them. Chacha transforms into the Magical Princess, summons the Phoenix Sword, and defeats the armor. The episode ends with everyone eating pancakes and Seravy wondering to himself why Dorothy and Shiine seem lost in thought. This episode features new ending animation and a new ending theme, "Leaving It to Chacha" (チャチャにおまかせ, Chacha ni Omakase) by Masami Suzuki, Tomo Sakurai, and Mayumi Akado.
33	"Shiine-chan's Grudge Match"; Transliteration: "Shiine-chan Shukumei no Taiketsu" (Japanese: しいねちゃん宿命の対決)	19 August 1994
Chacha, Seravy, Shiine, and Riiya are playing cards (and Seravy is cheating so he can win), but Shiine is still thinking about the exchange between Dorothy and Access where he overheard what he believed was a confession of lover between them. Meanwhile, Access tells the Daimaō that he needs some time in order to defeat Chacha. Seravy cheats again in order to win the card game again, and Shiine, still deep in thought and not paying attention to the game, decides to go home. Dorothy is taking a bubble bath and contemplating the possibility of Shiine fighting his father, Access, and decides she needs to ask Seravy about it. Shiine thinks she is going to meet Access, though, and he continues to daydream about various possibilities of a marriage between the two. Dorothy asks Shiine to clean up the place and have dinner ready when she gets back. Haideyansu and Yordas follow Access to the Spider Nest Prison but almost lose track of him as he disappears when riding past it. Shiine is cleaning up the books in her library when he happens across an old diary. It is mostly empty, but one page describes how Access brought the infant Shiine to Dorothy. At that moment, Shiine notices Access outside the window (on his horse, standing in the air far above the ground), and he blurts out his question about Access being his father. Access tells him that it is his choice to follow in his footsteps, but either way, he is going to defeat Chacha. Haideyansu and Yordas are below and overhear the conversation. Dorothy is at Seravy's home trying to figure out how to broach the subject when Seravy comments that Access is on his way there. Seravy asks Dorothy to go back to her castle and have Shiine come to help Chacha and Riiya with Access. When she returns to her castle, however, Shiine is not there, and she sees her diary open to the page about Shiine's past. Chacha and Riiya go outside and confront Access, trying to buy some time for Shiine to arrive. Just as Access is about to defeat them, Shiine arrives and attacks Access. However, his magic is not strong enough to defeat Access. Chacha transforms and summons the Phoenix Sword, and begins her test as Magical Princess. Seravy prevents Shiine and Riiya from assisting, telling them that she must deal with it on her own, and that he would have helped her already if he could. The Magical Princess eventually defeats Access, who then tells Shiine he brought him here so that he could grow up free of the Demon World. Dorothy says that Shiine's mother was being held captive by the Daimaō and this was the reason Access couldn't disobey the Daimaō. Chacha and Riiya promise to help Shiine free his mother.
34	"Reunion! Tearful Lullaby"; Transliteration: "Saikai! Namida no Komoriuta" (Japanese: 再会!涙の子守歌)	26 August 1994
Shiine, with Dorothy's help, is taking care of his father. Seravy explains that the Phoenix Sword can only remove evil and does not kill. Access keeps murmuring about a Spider Nest Prison, and Seravy says it is far to the west in a wasteland, where the Daimaō imprisoned those who disobeyed him. Chacha and Riiya again tell Shiine they want to help him free his mother. The Daimaō explains that to Haideyansu and Yordas that he had them keep an eye on Access because he knew Shiine was his son. He sends the two to Spider Nest Prison to work with Spydia (the guardian of the prison) to defeat the adventurous trio. As Chacha and her friends draw closer to the prison, they can hear the voice of a woman singing. While Haideyansu and Yordas are inside the prison trying to flatter Spydia, Chacha and her friends are outside the prison trying to get in. The prison is guarded by a spirit shield. Haideyansu and Yordas tell the trio that they'll never guess what the password is, so they start yelling things out. Eventually, Shiine figures out the password and they get in and Spydia traps Shiine by pretending to be his mother. After trapping Riiya as well, she begins chasing Chacha. Seravy and Dorothy, disguised as passing thread winders, free Riiya and Shiine while Spydia is occupied with Chacha, and they go to help Chacha. Spydia changes into a huge spider monster and begins attacking them. Chacha transforms and quickly dispatches the monster. Once the monster is defeated, they hear singing again, and Shiine finds his mother. When they get back to Seravy's house, Access has recovered and has had all the evil removed from him. He and Shiine's mother leave him in the care of Dorothy while they go off into seclusion for a while.
35	"You're So Persistent! Nyandaber"; Transliteration: "Shitsukoi zo! Nyandabā" (Japanese: しつこいぞ!ニャンダバー)	2 September 1994
Shironeko faints outside Seravy's house. After they carry her in, she tricks them into thinking she needs a place to stay and they offer to let her stay there. She puts a sleeping potion into the tea after contacting Dr. Mikeneko (her brother), but then drops the platter of teacups when Seravy offers her the best piece of cake, mistaking his offering her the piece with chocolate as a declaration of love. Dorothy blows her top when she hears and subsequently destroys Seravy's house. Shironeko later tries to replace Chacha's Princess Medallion with a fake while Chacha is bathing, but is stopped by Yakko who suspects her of trying to peek on Seravy bathing. After Seravy tells her Shironeko is a guest, Yakko warns her not to try seducing Seravy, then leaves. Later, when Chacha is asleep, Shironeko tries again, but the medallion keeps moving around, keeping just out of her reach until she uses a butterfly net. The next day Chacha and her friends see her off to meet her brother, Dr. Mikeneko. She offers them the Kitten House, a portable house shaped like a kitten head. Just when they are trying to figure out who she is, Dr. Mikeneko launches the Super Nyandaber robot. Chacha tries to transform, but then discovers the medallion is a fake. Dr. Mekeneko tries to attack them, but finds out the Super Nyandaber robot is too heavy to move just as Seravy arrives disguised as just-passing Renjishi Dancer. This distracts Shironeko so that she drops the real medallion, allowing Chacha to catch it and transform into the Magical Princess and summon the Phoenix Sword. She literally disarms the Super Nyandaber robot, and it crashes to the ground. Afterward, Chacha asks Seravy if she can keep the Kitten House since it was left behind, and he agrees to let her keep it.
36	"The Mirror of Truth Is a Liar!"; Transliteration: "Shinjitsu no Kagami wa Usotsuki da!" (Japanese: 真実の鏡はウソツキだ!)	9 September 1994
Shiine receives a letter from his father, causing Chacha to want to save her parents so she can do things with them. Seravy explains that there is a way to get back into the castle which is guarded by a magical barrier. Riiya's grandfather brings a giant map showing a secret passageway into the castle, but it is too heavy to carry, even for Riiya. Seravy shrinks it down to manageable size and the trio heads off to adventure. Unfortunately for them, the Daimaō also has a map of the passageway, and he has cursed the path to only allow those who are evil to pass. He also gives Haideyansu and Yordas the Mirror Sword and tells them to go to the Shrine of the Mirror of Truth, which is found along the secret path. They are to give the sword to Mirādo, the guardian of the Mirror of Truth. After passing through Mirādo and a hall of mirrors, they arrive at the Mirror of Truth. They start speaking to the mirror, but it starts saying the opposite of what they really think, causing them to all get upset and flustered with each other. Just as Haideyansu, Yordas, and Mirādo are gloating and about to attack, Yakko, Marin, ad Orin arrive trampling them. While everyone is distracted by all the confessions of love, Mirādo attacks them. While Orin distracts him, Chacha tries to transform but can not because they are not in synchronization as friends. Marin and Yakko try to jump in and take care of things, but they can not agree on a name for their duo. Orin then tries to fight Mirādo using her ninja skills, but Mirādo duplicates them and continues his lightning attack on Chacha, Riiya, and Shiine. Marin, Yakko, and Orin try the Mirror of Truth and find out what it is really doing. With the actual truth evident, Chacha is able to transform into the Magical Princess and summon the Phoenix Sword. Mirādo attempts to blind the Magical Princess, but she just closes her eyes and defeats him by listening to him. The Mirror of Truth is restored to its normal status and a strange coin appears on the ground where Mirādo was. Chacha and her friends are playing around in front of the mirror when the Daimaō begins speaking to them through it. He congratulates them on defeating Mirādo and making it this far, and invites them to continue if they dare. They join hands and step through the mirror. This episode features a new eyecatch in the middle of the episode.
37	"Barabaraman, the Flower-sprouting Teacher"; Transliteration: "Hanasaka Sensei Barabaraman" (Japanese: 花咲か先生バラバラマン)	16 September 1994
Chacha, Riiya, and Shiine are continuing on their quest, but have gotten lost. Riiya offers to sniff things out and finds Mr. Barabaraman nearby. He is so happy to see them he sprouts thorns all over and accidentally stabs Riiya with them. Yakko was apparently on the way to Mr. Barabaraman's family estate to help him figure out what is wrong there. Since that is where Chacha and her friends are going, they decide to travel together. When they arrive at the Flower Plateau, the place is overrun with huge rose brambles which attack them when they get too close. Yakko tries to help by removing the thorns from the branches with one of her potions, but only succeeds in having the thorns fly around after them. They then see the rest of the plants on the plateau have gone wild as well (as well as mobile), and flowers begin attacking them as they travel across the plateau. Haideyansu and Yordas are at Mr. Barabaraman's family home with their latest underling, who is using a breath weapon to change all the flowers. He does not seem to be able to affect the Madonna Rose at the center of the gardon. As Chacha and her friends approach the family home, Chacha tries to smell a rose, but it shatters when she touches it. When Mr. Barabara see this, he is heartbroken. Haideyansu and Yordas run up while carrying their underling, who explains to Chacha and her friends that the Madonna Rose has been doing these horrible things to the flowers on the plateau, and that his family been trying for generations to defeat it, but can not. Chacha and her friends begin attacking the rose until Mr. Barabaraman runs up and tells them to leave it alone. Makkin (the underling) then shows his true colors and begins attacking Chacha and her friends, all the while being cheered on by Haideyansu and Yordas. As they are about to be impaled by extremely thorny roses, Seravy and Dorothy appear as just-passing gardeners and trim the attacking roses. Makkin suddenly grows larger and more dangerous in appearance and begins attacking Chacha in earnest. The Madonna Rose is able to distract Makkin long enough for Chacha to transform and summon the Phoenix Sword, and she handily defeats it, causing it to release a coin.
38	"Everyone's an Animal!"; Transliteration: "Minna de Animaru!" (Japanese: みんなでアニマル!)	23 September 1994
The Kitten House seems intent on playing with them when they wake up in the morning. After being flooded out of the house, Chach, Riiya, ad Shiine notice a giant panda tent in their way. Kan-Kan and Lan-Lan, the evil acrobat twins are there to try to defeat Chacha again, but Chacha and her friends do not recognize them. The acrobats first try to defeat them with a ball bomb, but Marin suddenly appears and sends the bomb back at Kan-Kan just when he presses the detonator. They next try knife throwing using Shiine as the somewhat-willing volunteer, but Orin appears and deflects all the knives. Kan-Kan and Lan-Lan try their last trick: a bewitched serving of tea and Chinese meat buns which turn them all into animals. After they notice they've all changed, the evil twins capture them. Shiine, who has become a prairie dog, escapes by tunnelling underneath them, and causing the evil twins to fall into a hole and become unconscious. Shiien then helps everyone escape ad they begin searching for the potion which will change them back to normal. They find Yakko going through the potions in the evil twins' tent, but she consumes the bewitched buns and tea and changes into an inoshishi. The twins then capture everyone again, excepting Shiine and Orin. After disabling the twins again and stealing the potion, they use the potion to change everyone back to human so they can confront their captors on equal ground. The twins have a secret trick, though, and change the giant panda tent into King Panda, an evil underling of the Daimaō. Chacha transforms into the Magical Princess and summons the Phoenix Sword. After a short battle, she defeats King Panda and it drops a coin.
39	"Cucumber Rolls in the Dragon Palace"; Transliteration: "Ryūgūjō de Kappamaki" (Japanese: 竜宮城でカッパ巻き)	30 September 1994
Chacha has been having bad dreams about her parents, where they turn into the Daimaō, but she does not know what they mean. Later that day, they reach the very wide Yonzu River. They can not see any way across, but a ferry comes along (piloted by Haideyansu and Yordas). Partway across the river, Haideyansu and Yordas convince Riiya to pull the plug in the bottom of the boat, and everyone is sucked down into the Dragon Palace (including marin, who tries to rescue Riiya after hearing him drown). When they regain consciousness, they find they are surrounded by beautiful young girls, who dance for them and present them an amazing feast of all cucumber dishes. After the meal, Shiine is relaxing in a large open bath when he hears some of the girls from earlier talking about them. He takes a peek and sees that they are all kappa, and they are planning to eat Chacha and her friends. Shiine runs back to tell the others but is stopped by Princess Otto, the leader of the kappa. Chacha, Marin, and Riiya run up, and Princess Otto begins attacking them as well. Umibōzu hears Marin's cries for help and attacks Princess Otto. Just when Umibōzu is about to be defeated, Chacha transforms, summons the Phoenix Sword, and defeats Princess Otto. The explosion from the defeat of Princess Otto throws them back onto the shore where they started, and a rainbow bridge appears across the river. As they turn to go toward it, an ornate box tied with a purple cord appears. Chacha opens it and finds another coin, and they proceed across the rainbow bridge.
40	"Breakfast in the Kitten House"; Transliteration: "Nyanko Hausu de Chōshoku o" (Japanese: ニャンコハウスで朝食を)	7 October 1994
Shiine finds out that Chacha and Riiya are not morning people until they want to wake up. The episode consists of Shiine remembering past events where he feels slighted by Riiya, mostly because Chacha and Riiya have grown up together and so are always comfortable doing things with each other. All of these scenes are interspersed with scenes of breakfast where Shiine continues to feel slighted by Riiya's frank and carefree attitude. At the very end, both Chacha and Riiya offer food to Shiine as he has not been eating all during breakfast.
41	"The Drowsy Demon Erupts!"; Transliteration: "Nebusoku Majin Daifunka!" (Japanese: ねぶそく魔人大噴火!)	14 October 1994
Seravy is commenting to Dorothy about how quiet things are without Chacha, Shiine, and Riiya around. Meanwhile, Chacha and her friends are traveling through the Moon Desert, straight toward Aru Aru Oasis, home of the mighty rock genie Kazandan. Haideyansu and Yordas go ahead to the oasis and contact Kazandan, who hates being woken up. After they calm him down, Chacha and friends come along and promptly wake him up. As he chases them around, they try all sorts of magic to stop him, but nothing seems to work. They finally distract Kazandan long enough for Chacha to transform and she blasts him into rubble. Unfortunately, that only wakes him up the rest of the way and he begins attacking Chacha and her friends again. She transforms into the Magical Princess again and summons the Phoenix Sword, but Kazandan smashes her attack and knocks her to the ground. As Shiine and Riiya protect Chacha, Kazandan continues a furious attack and prepares to finish them off. Just as the final attack is about to destroy them, the Magical Princess begins to glow and rises, using the strong feelings from Riiya and Shiine to defeat Kazandan with a very powerful Wing Kris attack. However, she is unable to also stop Kazandan's attack and is almost destroyed until Seravy and Dorothy appear and block the last attack. After everyone recovers, Seravy tells Chacha she needs to find the final weapon, and another coin falls out of the sky.
42	"Search for the Legendary Shield!"; Transliteration: "Densetsu no Shīrudo o Sagase!" (Japanese: 伝説のシールドを探せ!)	21 October 1994
Chacha is recovering from her last flight, and Seravy tells her that she needs to find Mūra Māsa, the royal weaponsmith and have him make the third weapon: the Bird Shield for defense. Chacha and her friends leave to go find the weaponsmith. Haideyansu and Yordas have sent an underling to take care of things. When Chacha finds Mūra Māsa, he is very friendly until he finds out who they are, at which point he runs away and meets Barikimassu Rū, a very large and strong man. He helps them gather the materials for Mūra Māsa (the son of the original Mūra Māsa) and he creates a Bird Shield, albeit one without any decorations. Barikimassu Rū then tells them who he really is: a denizen of the Demon World and the best blacksmith there. He attacks Mūra Māsa, Chacha, and her friends, and Mūra Māsa runs away. He does not get far, though, before meeting Seravy, who tells him he needs to stop running. Meanwhile, Chacha has transformed and Barikimassu Rū is taking everything she can throw at him. The Bird Shield is strong enough to withstand even her most powerful attacks. Seravy convinces Mūra Māsa to help the princess, and he returns and tells her the shield isn't the real Bird Shield. Seravay also tells Riiya and Shiine to believe in Chacha and project their confidence into her. She is then able to defeat Barikimassu Rū. Mūra Māsa tells them he needs the Angel Iron Sand in order to make the real Bird Shield.
43	"Mission Accomplished! Bird Shield"; Transliteration: "Kansei! Bādo Shīrudo" (Japanese: 完成!バードシールド)	28 October 1994
Mūra Māsa explains the origin of the three weapons. Magical Queen Joan I defeated the demons and did so by using the three weapons. His family of blacksmiths has held the secret for generations. The must go to the Eden Mine to find the sand, and it is a long dangerous journey to get there. Just before reaching the top of a mountain where they are going to camp, they find an old trumpeting man named Cloud who happens to be returning to Eden. Haideyansu and Yordas spot them while they are crossing a bridge, and they notify the Daimaō that she is on the way to Eden. He instructs them to contact Kiyotōra, a demon who lives there, and let him handle Chacha. When Chacha and her friends reach Eden, the town is deserted except for a lot of stone statues of people among the ruined buildings. As they are looking around, they notice an old woman spying on them, but she runs away. They chase her and find out she is an old friend of Cloud's. She tells them a demon riding a tiger has been terrorizing the area. Anyone who defies him is turned to stone. She also tells them the deposits of Angel Iron Sand have been depleted. While Chacha, Riiya, Shiine, and Mūra Māsa are investigating the mine, Kiyotōra raids the village again, and Bonnie (Cloud's friend) is turned to stone while protecting Cloud from being changed. Haideyansu and Yordas finally meet up with Kyotōra and give him the message from the Daimaō. Meanwhile, Cloud offers his trumpet, which is made from Angel Iron Sand, to Chacha so the Bird Shield can be made, and Mūra Māsa gets to work making the shield. He finishes it, but before Chacha can take it, Kiyotōra's giant tiger attacks them, leading them to where Kiyotōra is waiting. Chacha transforms into the Magical Princess and summons the Phoenix Sword. Kiyotōra attacks, but Chacha blocks his first attack easily. He then transforms into a much larger version of himself (along with his tiger), and begins attacking with his giant spears which explode on contact. While the princess is trying to avoid Kiyotōra's attacks, Mūra Māsa tells her to use the shield. She looks over inside the building where it was being made and notices it beginning to glow. It floats up toward her and Mūra Māsa tells her to activate it by saying, "Bird Shield, Build Up!" She activates the shield and successful blocks a spear before dispatching Kiyotōra. Once Kiyotōra is defeated, all the townsfolk return to normal and Chacha and her friends continue on their way.
44	"Shining! Urara Academy Class Reunion"; Transliteration: "Kagayake! Urara Gakuen Dōsōkai" (Japanese: 輝け!うらら学園同窓会)	4 November 1994
Chacha receives an invitation to a class reunion, and everyone is excited to go. The Daimaō is not pleased that Chacha has found all three of the legendary weapons. Harpy volunteers to destroy Chacha due to her hatred of the former king (he banished her after she tried to seduce him into making her Queen). Seravy and Dorothy are worried about the three young adventurers as the enemies they've been fighting have become stronger and stronger. Dorothy suggests that they can always "pass by" and help them as in the past, but Seravy says that only those with royal blood can defeat the Daimaō. Dorothy has an idea, though. She suggests being disguised as monsters and attacking the trio in order to analyze their weaknesses, then helping them out with those later. Shiine overhears them talking and tells Riiya and Chacha about it. Shortly afterward, Marin, Yakko, Mr. Rascal, Mr. Barabaraman, and the principal arrive, followed by all of their former classmates, so the class reunion begins. Chacha goes into the restroom to wash her hands, and Harpy starts to attack, but is thrown off guard when Chacha thinks she is Seravy in disguise. Yakko arrives, and accidentally blasts her out of the building by using the wrong potion. Harpy charges back in and is mistaken as a former student by Mr. Barabaraman, then roped into being the target for the principal's knife throwing show. Seravy and Dorothy show up in the monster disguises at that point and Harpy begins attacking. Chacha transforms and summons the Phoenix Sword, attacking Harpy before Seravy can stop her. The Wing Kris Burning Flash only causes Harpy to grow as she absorbs the magical power. She then blasts the Magical Princess and seizes her along with Shiine and Riiya. Seravy wants to assist, but Dorothy stops him. Yako and Marin try to help, but their attacks are shrugged off, as are attempts by the principal, Orin, Mr. Barabaraman, and Mr. Rascal. Harpy tells Chacha that after she kills her, she will smash the statue of her parents, thus destroying the royal family and allow demons to rule the world. Chacha is able to summon the Bird Shield and reflect Harpy's own attack back onto her, thus destroying her. After the battle, Seravy tells Chacha it is time to go to the castle.
45	"Who's the Real One!"; Transliteration: "Honmono wa Dare na no!" (Japanese: 本物はだれなのー!)	11 November 1994
Chacha and friends are entering the dungeon, and Haideyansu and Yordas are convincing the resident mimic monster, Modoking, to stop Chacha. Chacha and her friends stumble across Yakko, who is looking for rare herbs only found in that dungeon. Chacha sees a mouse and run off down the passage, setting off a trap that traps her behind the wall. While Riiya is breaking down the walls that keep popping up, Shiine tries some magic but bumps another trap which puts him behind another wall where he steps on one of the mimics sent out by Modoking. Another mimic tricks Riiya into stepping on it in order to duplicate him as well. Meanwhile, Chacha runs into Modoking. She calls out for Riiya and Shiine when Modoking begins to attack, and the show up just in time to help her transform. However, they do not say the transformation words correctly and she does not change into the Magical Princess. She runs away and triggers another trap leading into a cave full of molten lava, but Yakko saves her with a levitation potion just before she enters the lava. Modoking attacks again and she attempts another transformation. Again, it does not work and she flees again only to set off another trap. Yakko saves her again. Riiya is still chasing after the food, which is being carried by one of the mimics. As he rounds a corner, he knocks Shiine into it and the mimic transforms into another Shiine. Realizing what has been happening, Shiine grabs Riiya and races back to where they last saw Chacha. Chacha is still trying to transform, but the fakes keep messing up the transformation with the wrong words. Suddenly, the real Shiine and Riiya burst through the ceiling of the cavern, knocking a huge boulder on top of Modoking. The fakes escape and Chacha really transforms this time and blasts Modoking with a Beauty Selene Arrow, making him disappear in a flash of light. Just as they think everything is over, the Magical Princess steps on a piece of Modoking, transforming it into the Dark Princess. It summons a dark version of the Phoenix Sword, as well as a Bird Shield. Just when it looks like Modoking might win, Shiine distracts it long enough for Chacha to Attack with her Wing Kris Burning Flash and defeat Modoking. Once they get outside the cave, they find another coin.
46	"Advance! Magical Ninja Corps"; Transliteration: "Susume! Majikaru Ninja Butai" (Japanese: 進め!マジカル忍者部隊)	18 November 1994
Chacha and friends are almost to Goldsmith, the town where all the currency for the kingdom is minted. The Daimaō has had Gekkō, an evil ninja, forge a large amount of cursed coins so that anyone holding one of the coins will become extremely greedy. When Chacha and her friends are almost to Goldsmith, they are suddenly surrounded by ninja who are after the mayor of the town. Chach is able to defeat the first round, but Gekkō almost has them when Orin and her grandfather show up to even the odds. Gekkō leaves them, but warns he will show no mercy if he sees them again. The mayor then explains how the cursed coins came to be created and asks for their help in saving the town. Chacha and friends sneak into the inner city where Gekkō has all the villagers imprisoned to work on minting the coins, but they are caught by his minions. After a short battle, Gekkō has Orin and her grandfather at his mercy, so Chacha and her friends reveal who they really are. She then transforms into the Magical Princess and summons the Phoenix Sword. After a far ranging battle, they meet on the rooftops for their showdown. A brief battle ensues and Chacha is able to defeat Gekkō in the end, finding another coin where he last stood. The villagers are very grateful for being freed, but the Daimaō is not pleased with Chacha.
47	"Crossing the Bridge of a Burning Friendship"; Transliteration: "Atsuki Yūjō no Hashi o Watare!" (Japanese: 熱き友情の橋を渡れ!)	25 November 1994
The Daimaō demands that Haideyansu and Yordas stop failing in their attempts to stop Chacha. Meanwhile, Chacha and her friends come upon a narrow but very deep valley, and only way across (short of climbing down into the valley) is abridge which has been destroyed. They try several ways to cross it, but none of them work. Haideyansu and Yordas disguise themselves and "sell" a powered balloon to Chacha and friends for free. Partway across the valley, however, the balloon explodes and the fall into the valley, only to get caught on a very long log being held out by Riiya's grandfather. Suddenly, the ground starts shaking and a large man in armor, Garrok, who attacks Riiya's grandfather and almost takes him into the deep valley. He explains that Garrok was the designer and builder of the bridge, and when the Daimaō took over, Riiya's grandfather destroyed the bridge to allow Seravy to escape. The Daimaō used Garrok's sadness and turned him to the side of evil. Garrok, who had been collapsed on a ledge far below, is commanded by the Daimaō to destroy Chacha, so he jumps back to the top and slices off the remainder of the bridge where Chacha and her friends are standing, causing it to fall into the deep valley below. Riiya's grandfather jumps in after them, catches up to them, and protects them as they continue falling. The bottom of the valley is full of molten lava, though, and Chacha gets separated from the others which allows Garrok to attack her. Before she can fall into the lava, though, she transforms and summons the Phoenix Sword. Garrok causes darkness to fall all around her so she can not see where he is. After several attacks, however, Chacha is able to determine where he is and attacks him with the Burning Flash, destroying his cursed armor, and obtaining another coin in the process. Riiya's grandfather throws them up to the top of the valley, allowing them to get across. He then tells Garrok why he destroyed the bridge, and that he mustn't give up. In order to save Garrok, he then transforms into a werewolf and blocks the lava with a huge pile of rocks in order to allow Garrok to get to safety and climb to the top. As they turn to continue their journey, they can see the castle.
48	"Tanuki Battle! The Bunbuku Teapot"; Transliteration: "Tanuki Gassen! Bunbuku Chagama" (Japanese: 狸合戦!ぶんぶく茶がま)	2 December 1994
Dorothy is over for lunch at Seravy's again, and they check in on how their young charges are dong. As Chacha and friends travel through the creepy forest on the way to the castle, they come upon a crying woman. Shiine thinks there is something strange happening, but Chacha and Riiya want to help the woman. Right before they are about to give her the coins they have been collecting, Shiine notices she is a tanuki. Riiya changes into the wolf cub when he sees her tail, and she runs away in fright. While Dorothy and Seravy are discussing their progress, Haideyansu and Yordas are giving a pep talk to a group of tanuki, convincing them to keep trying even though Riiya can turn into a wolf. They also give the tanuki a spray which hides their scent so Riiya can not smell them. The tanuki then transform into a Goddess of Love Fountain, telling Chacha and her friends that they just need to throw in a coin to have their wish of love granted. The trick works and the tanuki are able to steal all the coins. Chacha and her friends chase after the tanuki and eventually catch up, so the tanuki merge into a giant version and attack. As Chacha and her friends run away, they escape down a hole in the ground. The tanuki try to smoke them out, but they just go deeper into the hole and find a hidden chamber with murals about the ancient fight with the demons led by Queen Joan I. As they are discussing the possibilities for ancient use of the chamber, the large magic circle in the middle of the chamber begins to glow and the chamber raises them up to the surface where they can see the castle. The giant tanuki attacks them, but a magical barrier prevents them from getting hurt. Chacha then transforms into the Magical Princess and summons the Phoenix Sword. The tanuki transform into a giant bunbuku teapot which fires missiles at Chacha, but the magical barrier protects them again. Chacha is able to defeat the tanuki, and the stolen coins come raining down, each falling into one of the circles within the larger magic circle on the former chamber floor and causing the entire circle to glow. Chacha, Riiya, and Shiine each start glowing, and then are transported to one of the circles, with Chacha in the middle. Seravy, Dorothy, Orin, Yakko, and Marin are all transported to the circle as well, and Seravy tells the Daimaō that the Eight Holy Warriors have returned. The next step is to confront the Daimaō directly.
49	"Let's Go, Legendary Warriors!"; Transliteration: "Yuke! Densetsu no Senshi-tachi" (Japanese: ゆけ!伝説の戦士たち)	9 December 1994
The Eight Holy Warriors are on their way to the castle, and the Daimaō is preparing a welcoming party for them. As the warriors enter the castle, they set off a trap which separates them into three groups. Marin, Orin, and Yakko are attacked by Kyū-chan the vampire. Marin and Orin hide so he can not hurt them, but Yakko uses her Sun Potion to blind him. Orin then attacks him with fire bombs, Marin attacks him with sea urchins, and Yakko uses her Most Ugly Face potion. Finally, they all scream, "You're the ugliest!" and defeat him. The Daimaō tells Haideyansu and Yordas that every minion who is defeated only adds to his personal power. Meanwhile, Dorothy and Seravy run into Kazandan (literally), who asks Dorothy to marry him when she gets mad at him for getting mad at her. Seravy tells him he does not really want to marry her since she can not do most domestic things very well. This causes him to get upset and attack Seravy for getting in the way of his love, but Seravy handily defeats him. Chacha, Riiya, and Shiine are being attacked by the Demonic Armor, though there are several of them this time. After defeating them, the Daimaō begins appearing in front of them, and Chacha transforms into the Magical Princess and summons the Phoenix Sword. The Daimaō mocks her and hits her with an energy blast, knocking her to the ground. He then starts to attack Riiya and Shiine, but the Magical Princess stops him. She summons the Bird Shield as she is getting hit with multiple energy blasts, but she escapes unharmed. He attacks her again, but this time she is able to return the attack to him, blasting him out of the castle and causing a huge explosion high in the air above it. As the Eight Holy Warriors celebrate the defeat, Seravy notices that the body of the Daimaō has transformed into the bodies of Haideyansu and Yordas. He was using them as puppets to test Chacha. Chacha must now prepare herself for the real final showdown with the Daimaō.
50	"The Final Battle of Love, Courage, and Hope"; Transliteration: "Ai to Yūki to Kibō no Daikessen" (Japanese: 愛と勇気と希望の大決戦)	16 December 1994
The Eight Holy Warriors have resumed their search for where the Daimaō is within the castle. They eventually find their way to the throne room where he eventually appears. After a short battle with Seravy and Dorothy, the Daimaō seals them within bubbles and floats them up out of the way to deal with later. He then takes out the rest of Chacha's friends one by one until Chacha is the only one left conscious. She is somehow able to manage spells which would normally be effective, but the Daimaō shrugs them off. While the Daimaō is distracted with Chacha, Seravy notices that Elizabeth is lying on the ground and animates her so she can wake up Shiine and Riiya in order to allow Chacha to transform. Just as the Daimaō is about to turn Chacha into dust, Shiine and Riiya arrive and she is able to transform and summon the Phoenix Sword. The Daimaō attacks her with a huge energy blast, and the Bird Shield only blunts the attack. As she continues her fight, she finds that she just does not have enough power to beat him. Riiya and Shiine try to help again, but the Daimaō causes the walls and ceiling to collapse on them. The Daimaō then blasts a hole in the wall behind Chacha, showing her the statue of her parents. He then tells her again that he is now going to kill her. While she is contemplating this, she hears Elizabeth telling her that she has the power of everyone there. Everyone then jumps up and tells her they all support her. Yakko then throws a love potion at Seravy, where it breaks on the bubble encasing him. He frees Dorothy and tells everyone to stand on the great magic circle. The Daimaō did not know about the circle and is confused by this, but it lights up when Chacha steps into the middle of it. Everyone begins glowing and Chacha is infused with their strength. Chacha launches an attack on the Daimaō, but he then threatens to destroy the statue of her parents. Riiya and Shiine distract him long enough for Chacha to launch a Burning Kris attack powered by all of the Eight Holy Warriors, which defeats the Daimaō in a huge flash seen for miles across the land. Afterward, everyone is congratulating each other when the Princess Medallion begins to glow and the gem floats out and down to the floor, where it duplicates and shoots out a burst of smoke. When the smoke dissipates, King Genius (Chacha's grandfather) is standing there. As she is hugging him, a glow begins emanating from behind her, and all the people turned into statues by the Daimaō are suddenly brought back to life. Chacha runs to embrace her parents and explains how everyone helped her defeat the Daimaō.
51	"A Princess' Day Off"; Transliteration: "Purinsesu no Kyūjitsu" (Japanese: プリンセスの休日)	23 December 1994
Everyone in the kingdom is celebrating the defeat of the Daimaō, but Chacha seems to have disappeared somewhere in the castle so Shiine and Riiya are searching for her. Chacha is on one of the highest parapets of the castle reminiscing about her journey so far. The episode features key scenes showing when she received the Princess Medallion, met Shiine and Riiya, found the Phoenix sword, received the Bird Shield, and defeated the Daimaō. When Shiine and Riiya finally find her, her mother is asking her to tell both her and Chacha's father all about her adventures. They walk off hand-in-hand.
52	"Escape! Escape! A Big Mistake"; Transliteration: "Dassō! Dassō! Dai Shippai" (Japanese: 脱走!脱走!大しっぱい)	6 January 1995
The official celebrations are beginning at the castle. King Genius presents the EIght Holy Warriors to the gathered crowd, and Chacha trips will walking down the stairs. A week later, Seravy and Dorothy are having tea and commenting how quiet things are with the three youngsters gone. Riiya's grandfather brings a letter from Chacha to Seravy in which she tells him everything is going well. However, Chacha and her friends are beginning to tire of all the structure and protocol while living at the castle. King Genius tells Chacha it is time to give her a new magical item, so he brings a large chest and begins sorting through items for them. Chacha's father sends Access on a quest to find the Kingdom Crest. Chacha tells King Genius that they want to escape, but he tells them it is not possible even though he felt the same way when he was their age. They try to escape anyway, but are prevented from leaving the castle by a magical barrier erected by their teacher. As punishment for trying to escape their lessons, he has them clean King Genius' magical item storage room, which is extremely dirty and dusty. As they are looking around, they find a pitcher of endless water, and use that to fill up a chest so they can begin cleaning. However, something in the chest absorbs all the water and begins attacking them. As they run away from the monster, King Genius sees them as well as the sponge giant which is following them. The sponge giant finally corners them when Professor Desumasu comes in to protect them. The sponge giant quickly neutralizes him, though, so Chacha transforms into the Magical Princess. As she attacks the sponge giant, King Genius points out that as long as it has the pitcher of endless water it will be invincible. Shiine has Riiya change into the wolf cub, changes into a bazooka, and has King Genius fire Riiya at the pitcher, knocking it out of the grasp of the sponge giant. Chacha then defeats it with a Burning Flash attack, releasing a flood of water through the castle. After most of it has drained away, she apologizes to her father for the mess, but King Genius tells her that her father used to do worse. Chacha's father then gives her the application for attending Urara Academy Middle School, so they are all excited to be heading back to school.
53	"I Became the Best in the World!"; Transliteration: "Sekaiichi ni Natchatta!" (Japanese: 世界一になっちゃった!)	13 January 1995
Chacha and her friends are excited to be going back to school. Seravy is concerned that Chacha's magic has not really improved even though she defeated the Daimaō. The principal is happy to have students back at the school, so she breaks into song (along with everyone else at the school). Everyone is in the same classes as before (much to Marin's annoyance), and Mr. Rascal is excited to be their teacher again. At the beginning of class, though, a reporter from the monthly Magical Fan magazine comes in looking for Chacha, who has apparently challenged Seravy for title of Best Magician in the World. She was unaware this had happened and everyone is surprised. Seravy has done this to help Chacha grow as a witch. The battle begins in the school yard with all sorts of bizarre summonings, and Marin is trying to study in her classroom. Finally, Chacha summons a herd of Yakkos which swarm Seravy, but he is able to defeat them. She then summons photos of Dorothy when she was younger, which then punch Seravy, and he falls to the ground. Chacha is declared the winner and the Best Magician in the World. As she and her friends are celebrating when Hurricane Ken arrives and challenges Seravy. He points out that Chacha just beat him and leaves. He begins attacking, but his powers get sealed by Mr. Rascal. He tells them that he became violent due to being small and a crybaby when he was younger. After they let him go, and he starts up his hurricane again as soon as he reaches the gates. Yakko and Orin try to stop him, as does the principal, but they are unable to beat him. As he begins damaging the school, Chacha gets upset at his careless actions and transforms, summoning the Phoenix Sword and Bird Shield. She then defeats him, and the school settles back into its regular routine.
54	"A Succession of Challengers"; Transliteration: "Chōsensha Zoro Zoro" (Japanese: 挑戦者ゾロゾロ)	20 January 1995
Dorothy-chan is upset that seravy lost to chacha. chacha is outside being interviewed by a large group of reporters but when they ask what chacha did to beat seravy she answered katsutamahou (katsu -bread meat, tama -common cat name, hou -sound of an owl) the interviewers left. when she arrives at school her classmates ran to her and asked her to a challenge.
55	"Don't Forget the King's Seal"; Transliteration: "Wasurecha Dame yo Kokuō no Shirushi" (Japanese: 忘れちゃだめよ国王の印)	27 January 1995
Access is called by the King and Queen to retrieve the King's Crest which is revealed to be the Holy Bird. The Bird was commanded by the King and Queen during the Dark Lord's takeover, amidst the chaos to hide in a place where evil will not find it. Seravy tells Chacha, Riiya, Shiine and Dorothy that the bird (which transforms into a harp) when played by someone whose soul is good and pure brings out the beauty in the world; however when played by someone with a dark and evil soul, it will bring chaos and ruin the beauty of the world. Chacha, Riiya and Shiine are surprised by Access' messenger bird and brought to where Access was captured during his quest to find the King's Crest. Access had found the Holy Bird in a temple on top of a hidden mountain but before he could get it, two evil (yet musical) siblings appeared: Soprano and Baritone. Though they had no idea what the golden bird was, they would not let Access escape with it. Chacha, Riiya and Shiine are led by Access' bird and developed a plan to help Access free. In the process, Chacha transforms and ultimately defeats the siblings. However, Soprano was able to escape along with the golden bird after having found out that it was the King's Crest, the Holy Bird. It is now up to Chacha to retrieve the bird once more before Soprano opens the gates to Hell.
56	"Goodbye Holy Up"; Transliteration: "Sayonara Hōrī Appu" (Japanese: さよならホーリーアップ)	3 February 1995
Chacha, Shiine and Riiya fly to where Seravy suspects Soprano will head: where the gates of Hell can be opened. Despite their efforts, Soprano is successful in opening the gate and unleashes a number of monsters and demons that the Magical Princess had to defeat (with the help of Riiya, Shiine, Dorothy and Seravy) and defeating Soprano in the process. They retrieve the Holy Bird but a huge hole in the earth cannot be sealed by magic. Seravy proposes the only way to seal it: placing the three holy items (Chacha's medallion, Shiine's ring and Riiya's bracelet) around the hole where magic will ultimately seal the items inside the hole. The kids are reluctant to bid farewell to the Magical Princess but Chacha realizes that any sacrifice is worth seeing the world at its beauty. So they give up the items and the Holy Bird is brought back to the castle to be played by the Queen, bringing beauty once more to the world. Piisuke also returns. Though Chacha has lost her powers to Holy Up, the King, Queen and Grand King bestowed three other items from their own childhood to Chacha: the Aurora Crescent Bracelet, a magical compact that allows communication between her and her mother any time and a magical brooch that stores practically anything in it.
57	"Let's Aim to Be the World's Best Skaters!"; Transliteration: "Sekaiichi ni Mukatte Subero!" (Japanese: 世界一に向ってすべろ!)	3 March 1995
The Urara Magical School students compete in a skating competition where the winner will be crowned greatest magician in the world. In the end, Chacha ends up winning, retaining her title.
58	"Elizabeth SOS!"; Transliteration: "Erizabesu Esu Ō Esu!" (Japanese: エリザベスSOS!)	10 March 1995
Seravy leaves Chacha in charge of the house as he and Dorothy attend his school reunion and leaves Elizabeth behind (after being persuaded by Dorothy). As Chacha, Riiya and Shiine play along with Elizabeth they cast magical mishap after another which results in a stretched out Eizabeth. Chacha panics but luckily stumbles upon the greatest dollmaker in the world and asks him to repair Elizabeth. He brings the children to his home and introduces his other dolls that have come to life. One particular doll (who is a magician as well) becomes jealous of Chacha and her magical items and her World's Greatest Magician title and challenges Chacha to a duel. Chacha refuses to fight and continues to play with the other toys, which only angers the magicial doll more.
59	"An Incredibly Small Love Story"; Transliteration: "Suggoku Chiisana Koi Monogatari" (Japanese: すっごく小さな恋物語)	17 March 1995
A very small magician who can fly named Mosqui comes to Urara School and spears Chacha's friends with poison, challenging Chacha to retrieve the spear from her to cure her friends and stop them from turning into stone within an hour. During the chase, Ossu is seen to have fallen in love with Mosqui and in the end, Mosqui realizes she does not need to become the World's Greatest Magician to be noticed because someone has fallen in love with her. Chacha's friends are speared just in time.
60	"Love Ya, Love Ya, Yakko-chan!"; Transliteration: "Suki Suki Yakko-chan" (Japanese: すきすきやっこちゃん!)	24 March 1995
Chacha tries to help stuttering Pickle-kun with his crush on Yakko-chan by planning to lose a challenge match to him. Seravy insta-defeats Chacha and battles Pickle-kun instead. Shiine and Riiya free Chacha and she then teams up with Pickle-kun against Seravy. After a valiant battle Seravy remains the world magical champion.
61	"The Adventure of a Young Seravy"; Transliteration: "Yangu Seravī no Bōken" (Japanese: ヤングセラヴィーの冒険)	31 March 1995
Chacha, Riiya and Shiine are left at home and decide to explore Seravy's collection of magic stuff in the basement. They accidentally time slip and find themselves in front of younger Dorothy's (and Doris') mansion, as little Dorothy tries to run away to become the World's Greatest Magician's apprentice. They also encounter Seravy who is crazy about Dorothy and realize that he cannot do magic, which means he can not help them return in time. Seravy and the children go after Dorothy to save her from the infamous, then-World's Greatest Magician, Piikapon. Piikapon plots to keep Dorothy for ransom and the children are kept out of the mountain where Piikapon resides.
62	"Scoop! The Pink Secret"; Transliteration: "Sukūpu! Pinku no Himitsu" (Japanese: スクープ!ピンクの秘密)	7 April 1995
Chacha, young Seravy, Riiya and Shiine are able to get inside Piikapon's mansion and discover his secret: he is bald and very insecure about it, trying to find a hair growth spell throughout the years. Eventually, Seravy develops magic skills just by mimicking Piikapon and does it naturally. After young Dorothy drops a huge block of ice on Piikapon, defeating him, she wins the World's Greatest Magician title. Seravy is thrilled that Dorothy won and she realizes Seravy genuinely likes her and is not after the title after all. Seravy conjures up a big bouquet of flowers which hits Dorothy. Seravy is then declared the World's Greatest Magician which angers Dorothy. Seravy refuses to fight his precious Dorothy so Dorothy changes her curly blonde hair to straight pink hair which upsets Seravy. This is the beginning of their argument and constant bickering relating to Dorothy's "pink ugly hair". Chacha, Riiya and Shiine eventually get back to the present time with the help of a 'time slipper'.
63	"Thorny Thorny Three-legged Race"; Transliteration: "Toge Toge Ninin Sankyaku" (Japanese: とげとげ二人三脚)	14 April 1995
Chacha and Teacher Barabaraman are paired together for the three-legged race for school.
64	"Surprise! Riiya's Mama?"; Transliteration: "Bikkuri! Rīya Mama?" (Japanese: びっくり!リーヤママ?)	21 April 1995
During a class field trip, Riiya accidentally falls off a bridge inside a cave and gets lost ashore somewhere inside the cave. A mother monster rescues him and tends to him like a baby. The Banana class searches for him and finds the mother monster and thinks she will hurt Riiya. They scare the monster away, hurting her feelings. After a long pursuit, everything is resolved when the class finds the monster's actual baby and reuniting them together, and the monster releases Riiya.
65	"Nostalgic Nyandaber"; Transliteration: "Natsukashi zo Nyandabā" (Japanese: 懐かしいぞニャンダバー)	28 April 1995
Dr. Mikeneko & Shironeko, along with their family members, return to challenge ChaCha and Seravy again. Most of the episode recaps their previous defeats at the hands of Magical Princess. However, they are disappointed when Seravy reveals that there is no reason to fight anymore due to the gates of Hell being sealed by Magical Princess's sacrifice. Fortunately, Seravy recommends the post of Curator of the Science Museum to Dr. Mikeneko, and he happily accepts.
66	"Mayachon, the Strict Teacher"; Transliteration: "Butōha Sensei Mayachon" (Japanese: 武闘派先生まやちょん)	5 May 1995
The Urara students are required to take an exam in order to go up a grade level. Teacher Rascal is determined to have his Banana class students all pass, competing with the Orange class teacher, Mayachon. Riiya, Chacha, Yakko, Orin and some students fail the first part (together with Marine) and are given a second and third chance at passing, much to Rascal's dismay. Mayachon has already sent her students home because they all passed the first try. Riiya is the only student left who has not passed and Teacher Rascal will not give up. Mayachon seems to challenge Rascal for the next day in front of the carnival. When Riiya passes (by sheer luck), Rascal prepares for his match and brings Chacha, Shiine and Riiya to witness his sure feat. To his surprise, Mayachon shows up all dressed up with a picnic basket. She is embarrassed and is angry at Rascal once more.
67	"Dread! Friday the 12th" Transliteration: "Kyōfu! Jūichi Nichi no Kinyōbi" (Japanese: 恐怖!12日の金曜日)	12 May 1995
Chacha and her Urara Magic School classmates are camping out together with their teachers Rascal, Barabaraman and the principal. During the campfire the principal tells the tale of Jason (similar to Jason from Friday the 13th). Chacha, together with the girls from Banana class, Orin, Yakko, Mary, etc. sleep together in one cabin but Chacha and Orin have to go the bathroom. Yakko, tired of their noise, accompanies them to the washroom and guards the door. They encounter a masked man calling out "Jason" and a chase ensues, with Marin eventually getting caught (She was trying to sneak into Riiya's cabin). The girls discover Jason's cabin and finds his collection of masks, while Jason suddenly appears. However, Jason simply returns a seashell earring that Yakko dropped during the day and reveals that he is just a humble woodcutter that collects masks. The girls return to camp where their classmates and teachers tell them of how Jason wrecked the entire camp site. The girls realize that they were the cause, but can not bring themselves to confess the truth.
68	"Umibōko's Great First Love Battle!"; Transliteration: "Umibōko! Hatsukoi Dai Batoru" (Japanese: 海坊子!初恋大バトル)	19 May 1995
After Marine insults Umibozo again, Umibōko decides to avenge her brother by kidnapping Teacher Rascal, refusing to return him unless Marine apologizes, which proves difficult especially because Marine had been elected Mermaid Queen, inflating her ego.
69	"A Dance Party Is a Surefire Hit!"; Transliteration: "Hisshō! Dansu Pātī" (Japanese: 必勝!ダンスパーティー)	26 May 1995
Shiine and Riiya are invited by Seravy to a sleepover at their home. Chacha agrees to go to the school dance with Riiya, leaving Shiine heartbroken and jealous. During their bathtime, Shiine freezes Riiya in the tub which causes Riiya to get sick the next day, having to miss out on the school dance. Shiine is delighted because he can now take Chacha to the dance. Riiya, disobeying Seravy's orders to stay in bed, escapes and heads to school determined to dance with Chacha. However, his colds and fever get the best of him so he is taken to the school clinic where a very creepy, pale-faced nurse tends to him. He tries his best to escape, thought efforts go futile. At the dance, Chacha and Shiine feel guilty and too sad to enjoy the dance. They however inform Teacher Rascal and Principal that Riiya is being taken care of by the nurse. They soon realize that the school has no nurse and is now being haunted by a Nighting Ghost, a group of ghosts who "take care" of their patients, causing more pain and illness to worsen according to legend. They eventually rescue Riiya but discover that the ghost means no harm; in fact, she cured Riiya. Much to Shiine's dismay, Riiya gets to dance with Chacha all night, leaving no dance for Shiine alone with Chacha.
70	"Yakko-chan's First Love Lecture"; Transliteration: "Yakko-chan no Hatsukoi Dangi" (Japanese: やっこちゃんの初恋談義)	2 June 1995
An ill Seravy sends Yakko to search for reagents to make a cold medicine. She takes Chacha which leaves Seravy to rest and recover. Yakko recalls on how she met Seravy years ago when she was little to Shiine, Riiya and Chacha. She also recalls some silly kids she met during her adventure, unaware that they were actually Shiine, Riiya and Chacha as kids.
71	"Once Again! The Return of Tono"; Transliteration: "Futatabi! Tono no Onārī" (Japanese: 再び!殿のおな〜り〜)	9 June 1995
The episode begins with Seravy and Dorothy having an argument. Dorothy is about the leave Seravy's house but is met by a messenger delivering wine for Seravy. Dorothy takes it instead and leaves. Later on, Shiine, Chacha and Riiya are playing outside the house when Dorothy (wearing a ridiculous head wrap) appears and tells them she and Shiine are moving to a far away place. Riiya and Chacha try to convince Dorothy not to leave but she insists on leaving right away before Seravy realizes why. While trying to stop them, Riiya causes Dorothy's head wrap to fall off, revealing her now-blond hair. Suddenly, Seravy appears and is more than delighted to see his Dorothy back to normal. Seravy's obsession with Dorothy ensues while the children try to figure out why Dorothy's hair has become blonde as well as her losing her magical abilities the same time. Piikapon (who they call Tono) appears from the tree and challenges Seravy to another duel, revealing that it was he who gave Seravy the wine that was spiked with a potion to make him lose his magic. However, Piikapon soon realizes that Seravy still has his powers and it was Dorothy who had drunk his concoction which is why she is blonde and left without powers. Piikapon flees but is pursued by the children while Seravy continues to ignore everybody else but Dorothy who has now become unfazed. Piikapon is once again defeated by the children and Dorothy's hair turn pink again after her magical abilities are restored at sundown, the time when the potion loses its effects. Seravy is left bitter and upset at Dorothy's pink hair.
72	"Shiine-chan's Biggest Mistake"; Transliteration: "Shiine-chan Saidai no Shippai" (Japanese: しいねちゃん最大の失敗)	16 June 1995
Riiya and Shiine try to earn money to buy a suitable present for Chacha's upcoming birthday.
73	"The Riddle of Dorothy's Castle"; Transliteration: "Doroshī-jō no Nazo" (Japanese: どろしー城の謎)	23 June 1995
Seravy and Dorothy argue once more because Seravy taunted Dorothy about her "ugly pink hair". Dorothy flees Mount Mochimochi while Seravy, along with Riiya, are accidentally shrunk by magic. Seravy's powers have shrunk as well so he cannot return himself back to normal. Chacha, Riiya and Shiine decide that Dorothy is the only one who can help but since they are fighting, how can they convince Dorothy to help Seravy? They travel to Dorothy's castle and find their way inside for the potion to bring them both back to their normal size. They stumble upon obstacles (including a vengeful Dorothy) and Seravy almost drowns in Dorothy's bathtub. Dorothy, according to the kids, saved Seravy and was distraught thinking that he might die. In the end, Seravy and Riiya accidentally become bigger than Dorothy's castle.
74	"The Excitement! A Marriage Proposal?"; Transliteration: "Osawagase! Kekkon Sengen?" (Japanese: お騒がせ!結婚宣言?)	30 June 1995
Riiya's Grandpa comments how perfect a couple Seravy and Dorothy make. This gives Chacha, Riiya and Shiine the idea of a wedding! Soon, rumors start flying that a wedding will take place. Dorothy tells Seravy about the rumor and she is surprised with a proposal by Seravy; he says that he still loves her regardless of her pink hair. The wedding is attended by everybody including Nyandaber and his sister, Garokk, Umibozu and more! The end results to the wedding being cancelled because Seravy still tried to change Dorothy's pink hair. Because Seravy and Dorothy are meant for each other, Chacha's parents assure the children that they wedding is only postponed, not cancelled.

=== OVA series (1995-1996) ===
No.	Title	Original release date
1	"Here Comes Popy-kun!"; Transliteration: "Popi-kun ga Yattekita!" (Japanese: ポピィくんがやってきた!)	6 December 1995
2	"Catching the Trip to the Hot Springs!"; Transliteration: "Onsen Ryokō o Tsukamaero!" (Japanese: 温泉旅行をつかまえろ!)	3 February 1996
3	"Goodbye Chacha! A Tearful Hana Ichi Monme"; Transliteration: "Sayonara Chacha! Namida no Hana Ichi Monme" (Japanese: さよならチャチャ!涙の花いちもんめ)	6 March 1996
See also Hana Ichi Monme.
