= List of adventure films of the 1990s =

A list of adventure films released in the 1990s.

== 1990 ==
| Title | Director | Cast | Country | Subgenre/Notes |
|---|---|---|---|---|
| 1001 Nights | Philippe de Broca | Catherine Zeta-Jones, Thierry Lhermitte, Gérard Jugnot | France | Fantasy adventure, adventure comedy |
| Air America | Roger Spottiswoode | Mel Gibson, Robert Downey Jr. | United States | |
| Amazon | Mika Kaurismäki | Kari Väänänen, Robert Davi, Rae Dawn Chong | Finland; United States; France; Brazil | |
| Bullet in the Head | John Woo | Jacky Cheung, Waise Lee, Simon Yam | Hong Kong | War adventure |
| Captain Fracassa's Journey | Ettore Scola | Vincent Perez, Emmanuelle Béart, Massimo Troisi, Ornella Muti, Ciccio Ingrassia | Italy; France | Adventure comedy |
| A Chinese Ghost Story II | Ching Siu Tung | Leslie Cheung, Joey Wong, Michelle Reis | Hong Kong | Fantasy adventure |
| A Cry in the Wild | Mark Griffiths | Jared Rushton, Ned Beatty, Pamela Sue Martin | United States | |
| Cyrano de Bergerac | Jean-Paul Rappeneau | Gérard Depardieu, Vincent Perez, Anne Brochet | France | |
| Dragonfight | Warren A. Stevens | Robert Z'Dar, Paul Coufos, Michael Paré | United States | Science fiction adventure, fantasy adventure |
| Dreams | Akira Kurosawa | Akira Terao, Martin Scorsese, Mitsunori Isaki, Chishū Ryū | Japan; United States | Fantasy adventure |
| DuckTales the Movie: Treasure of the Lost Lamp | Bob Hathcock | Alan Young (voice), Terence McGovern (voice), Russi Taylor (voice) | United States | Animated film, family-oriented adventure |
| Havana | Sydney Pollack | Robert Redford, Lena Olin, Raúl Juliá, Tomas Milian | United States | |
| The Hunt for Red October | John McTiernan | Sean Connery, Alec Baldwin | United States | Sea adventure |
| Ivory Hunters | Joseph Sargent | John Lithgow, Isabella Rossellini, James Earl Jones | United States | |
| Jean Galmot, aventurier | Alain Maline | Christophe Malavoy, Roger Hanin, Désirée Nosbusch, Ute Lemper | France | |
| Jetsons: The Movie | William Hanna, Joseph Barbera | George O'Hanlon (voice), Mel Blanc (voice), Penny Singleton (voice), Tiffany (voice), Patric Zimmerman (voice), Don Messick (voice) | United States | |
| King of the Wind | Peter Duffell | Navin Chowdhry, Richard Harris, Glenda Jackson, Frank Finlay, Jenny Agutter | United Kingdom | |
| Lord of the Flies | Harry Hook | Balthazar Getty, Chris Furrh, Danuel Pipoly | United States | Adventure drama |
| Mal d'Africa | Sergio Martino | Richard Hatch, Daniel Greene, Eleonora Brigliadori, James Mitchum | Italy | |
| Mountains of the Moon | Bob Rafelson | Patrick Bergin, Iain Glen, Richard E. Grant | United States | Adventure drama |
| No, or the Vain Glory of Command | Manoel de Oliveira | Luís Miguel Cintra, Diogo Dória, Miguel Guilherme | Portugal | |
| A Nymphoid Barbarian in Dinosaur Hell | Brett Piper | Paul Guzzi, Linda Corwin, Alex Pirnie | United States | Fantasy adventure |
| Old Explorers | Bill Pohlad | José Ferrer, James Whitmore | United States | |
| The Old Man and the Sea | Jud Taylor | Anthony Quinn | United States | Sea adventure |
| Panama Sugar | Marcello Avallone | Scott Plank, Oliver Reed, Lucrezia Lante della Rovere | Italy | |
| Predator 2 | Stephen Hopkins | Danny Glover, Gary Busey | United States | |
| Prey for the Hunter | John H. Parr | Todd Jensen | United States | |
| The Rescuers Down Under | Hendel Butoy, Mike Gabriel | | United States | Animated film, family-oriented adventure, fantasy adventure |
| Saga of the Phoenix | Lam Ngai Kai | Yuen Biao | Hong Kong | Fantasy adventure |
| Schweitzer | Gray Hofmeyr | Malcolm McDowell | United States | |
| The Serpent of Death | Anwar Kawadri | Jeff Fahey, Camilla More | United States; United Kingdom; Egypt | |
| The Sheltering Sky | Bernardo Bertolucci | Debra Winger, John Malkovich | Italy; United Kingdom; United States | Adventure drama, romantic adventure |
| Shipwrecked | Nils Gaup | Stian Smestad, Gabriel Byrne, Louisa Milwood-Haigh, Trond Peter Stamsø Munch | Norway; Sweden; United States | |
| Sulle tracce del condor | Sergio Martino | Daniel Greene, Brent Huff, Christine Leigh, Charles Napier | Italy | |
| Till There Was You | John Seale | Mark Harmon, Jeroen Krabbé, Deborah Kara Unger | Australia; United States | |
| Total Recall | Paul Verhoeven | Arnold Schwarzenegger, Rachel Ticotin, Sharon Stone | United States | Space adventure |
| Treasure Island | Fraser Clarke Heston | Charlton Heston, Christian Bale, Oliver Reed, Christopher Lee | United States; United Kingdom | |
| White Hunter Black Heart | Clint Eastwood | Clint Eastwood | United States | |

== 1991 ==
| Title | Director | Cast | Country | Subgenre/Notes |
|---|---|---|---|---|
| An American Tail: Fievel Goes West | Phil Nibbelink, Simon Wells | | United States | Animated film, western, family-oriented adventure |
| Armour of God II: Operation Condor | Jackie Chan | Jackie Chan, Carol Cheng, Eva Cobo | Hong Kong | Adventure comedy |
| At Play in the Fields of the Lord | Héctor Babenco | Tom Berenger, John Lithgow, Daryl Hannah, Aidan Quinn, Kathy Bates, Tom Waits | United States | |
| Black Robe | Bruce Beresford | Lothaire Bluteau | Canada; Australia | Adventure drama, western |
| Cabeza de Vaca | Nicolás Echevarría | Juan Diego | Mexico | |
| Caccia allo scorpione d'oro | Umberto Lenzi | Andy J. Forest, Christine Leigh, David Brandon | Italy | |
| A Chinese Ghost Story 3 | Ching Siu Tung | Joey Wong, Jacky Cheung | Hong Kong | Fantasy adventure |
| City Slickers | Ron Underwood | Billy Crystal, Daniel Stern, Bruno Kirby, Jack Palance | United States | Western, adventure comedy |
| Curse of the Crystal Eye | Joe Tornatore | Jameson Parker, Cynthia Rhodes | United States; South Africa | |
| Highlander II: The Quickening | Russell Mulcahy | Christopher Lambert, Sean Connery, Virginia Madsen, Michael Ironside | United Kingdom; France; Argentina | Fantasy adventure |
| Hook | Steven Spielberg | Robin Williams, Dustin Hoffman, Julia Roberts, Bob Hoskins, Maggie Smith | United States | Fantasy adventure, pirate film, family-oriented adventure |
| Indio 2: The Revolt | Antonio Margheriti | Marvelous Marvin Hagler, Charles Napier | Italy | |
| Isabelle Eberhardt | Ian Pringle | Mathilda May, Tchéky Karyo, Peter O'Toole | Australia; France | |
| K2 | Franc Roddam | Michael Biehn, Matt Craven, Raymond J. Barry | United Kingdom | Mountaineering adventure |
| The Last Match | Fabrizio De Angelis | Oliver Tobias, Ernest Borgnine, Charles Napier, Henry Silva, Martin Balsam | Italy; United States | |
| Motorama | Barry Shils | Jordan Christopher Michael, Martha Quinn | United States | |
| The NeverEnding Story II: The Next Chapter | George Miller | Jonathan Brandis, Kenny Morrison, Clarissa Burt | United States; Germany | Fantasy adventure, family-oriented adventure |
| Once Upon a Time in China | Tsui Hark | Jet Li, Yuen Biao, Jacky Cheung | Hong Kong | |
| Pure Luck | Nadia Tass | Martin Short, Danny Glover | United States | Adventure comedy |
| Return to the Blue Lagoon | William A. Graham | Milla Jovovich, Brian Krause, Lisa Pelikan | United States | Adventure drama |
| Robin Hood: Prince of Thieves | Kevin Reynolds | Kevin Costner, Alan Rickman, Morgan Freeman, Mary Elizabeth Mastrantonio, Christian Slater, Sean Connery | United States | |
| Robin Hood | John Irvin | Patrick Bergin, Uma Thurman, Jürgen Prochnow, Edward Fox, Jeroen Krabbé | United Kingdom | |
| The Rocketeer | Joe Johnston | Billy Campbell, Timothy Dalton, Jennifer Connelly, Alan Arkin, Paul Sorvino | United States | Science fiction adventure |
| Scream of Stone | Werner Herzog | Vittorio Mezzogiorno, Mathilda May, Stefan Glowacz, Donald Sutherland | Canada; Germany; France | Mountaineering adventure |
| Star Trek VI: The Undiscovered Country | Nicholas Meyer | William Shatner, Leonard Nimoy, DeForest Kelley | United States | Space adventure |
| Thelma & Louise | Ridley Scott | Susan Sarandon, Geena Davis | United States | |
| La Totale! | Claude Zidi | Thierry Lhermitte, Miou-Miou, Eddy Mitchell | France | Adventure comedy |
| Until the End of the World | Wim Wenders | William Hurt, Solveig Dommartin, Sam Neill, Max von Sydow, Jeanne Moreau, Rüdiger Vogler | United States; Germany; France; Australia | |
| White Fang | Randal Kleiser | Klaus Maria Brandauer, Ethan Hawke, Seymour Cassel | United States | Family-oriented adventure |
| The White Viking | Hrafn Gunnlaugsson | Gotti Sigurdarson, Maria Bonnevie | Iceland | |
| Wizards of the Demon Sword | Fred Olen Ray | Russ Taymblyn, Lyle Waggoner, Blake Bahner | United States | Fantasy adventure |

== 1992 ==
| Title | Director | Cast | Country | Subgenre/Notes |
|---|---|---|---|---|
| 1492: Conquest of Paradise | Ridley Scott | Gérard Depardieu, Armand Assante, Sigourney Weaver, Ángela Molina, Fernando Rey, Tchéky Karyo, Frank Langella | United Kingdom; Spain; France | Adventure drama |
| Adventures in Dinosaur City | Brett Thompson | Omri Katz, Tiffanie Poston | United States | Science fiction adventure, family-oriented adventure |
| Aladdin | Ron Clements, John Musker | Robin Williams (voice), Scott Weinger (voice), Linda Larkin (voice) | United States | Animated film, musical, fantasy adventure, family-oriented adventure |
| Army of Darkness | Sam Raimi | Bruce Campbell | United States | Fantasy adventure |
| L'Atlantide | Bob Swaim | Tchéky Karyo, Christopher Thompson, Victoria Mahoney, Anna Galiena, Jean Rochefort | France; Italy | |
| Batman Returns | Tim Burton | Michael Keaton, Danny DeVito, Michelle Pfeiffer | United States | |
| Captain Ron | Thom Eberhardt | Kurt Russell, Martin Short, Mary Kay Place | United States | Adventure comedy, sea adventure |
| Christopher Columbus: The Discovery | John Glen | Marlon Brando, Tom Selleck, Georges Corraface, Rachel Ward, Robert Davi, Catherine Zeta-Jones, Benicio del Toro | United States; United Kingdom; Spain | Adventure drama |
| Far and Away | Ron Howard | Tom Cruise, Nicole Kidman | United States | |
| Fifty/Fifty | Charles Martin Smith | Peter Weller, Robert Hays | United States | |
| The Last of the Mohicans | Michael Mann | Daniel Day-Lewis, Madeleine Stowe, Russell Means, Eric Schweig, Jodhi May, Steven Waddington, Wes Studi, Maurice Roëves, Patrice Chéreau, Dylan Baker, Edward Blatchford, Tracey Ellis, Terry Kinney, Sebastian Roché, Justin M. Rice, Dennis Banks, Pete Postlethwaite, Colm Meaney, Mac Andrews, Benton Jennings, Jared Harris | United States | Western |
| The Lost World | Timothy Bond | John Rhys-Davies, David Warner | Canada | Fantasy adventure |
| Medicine Man | John McTiernan | Sean Connery, Lorraine Bracco | United States | |
| New Dragon Gate Inn | Raymond Lee | Maggie Cheung, Brigitte Lin | Hong Kong | Romantic adventure |
| Porco Rosso | Hayao Miyazaki | | Japan | Animated film, fantasy adventure |
| Return to the Lost World | Timothy Bond | John Rhys-Davies, David Warner | Canada | Fantasy adventure |
| Royal Tramp | Corey Yuen, Gordon Chan | Cheung Man, Kenny Bee, Andy Lau | Hong Kong | Adventure comedy |
| Royal Tramp 2 | Corey Yuen, Gordon Chan | Brigitte Lin, Stephen Chow | Hong Kong | Adventure comedy |
| Ruby Cairo | Graeme Clifford | Andie MacDowell, Liam Neeson, Viggo Mortensen | United States | |
| Wind | Carroll Ballard | Matthew Modine, Jennifer Grey, Stellan Skarsgård | United States; Japan | Sea adventure |

== 1993 ==
| Title | Director | Cast | Country | Subgenre/Notes |
|---|---|---|---|---|
| The Adventures of Huck Finn | Stephen Sommers | Elijah Wood, Courtney B. Vance, Jason Robards, Robbie Coltrane, Ron Perlman, Anne Heche | United States | Family-oriented adventure |
| Alive | Frank Marshall | Ethan Hawke, Vincent Spano, Josh Hamilton | United States | Adventure drama |
| Arctic Blue | Peter Masterson | Rutger Hauer, Dylan Walsh | United States | |
| The Bride with White Hair | Philip Kwok, Ronny Yu | Brigitte Lin, Leslie Cheung, Nam Kit-Ying | Hong Kong | Fantasy adventure |
| Cliffhanger | Renny Harlin | Sylvester Stallone, John Lithgow, Janine Turner | United States | Mountaineering adventure |
| Cool Runnings | Jon Turteltaub | Leon, Doug E. Doug, Rawle D. Lewis, Malik Yoba, John Candy | United States | |
| Dennis the Menace | Nick Castle | Mason Gamble, Joan Plowright, Lea Thompson, Christopher Lloyd, Walter Matthau | United States | |
| Eight Hundred Leagues Down the Amazon | Luis Llosa | Barry Bostwick, Daphne Zuniga, Tom Verica, Adam Baldwin | United States; Peru | |
| L'Enfant lion | Patrick Grandperret | Wéré Wéré Liking, Souleyman Koli, Salif Keita | France | |
| A Far Off Place | Mikael Salomon | Reese Witherspoon, Ethan Randall, Jack Thompson | United Kingdom | Adventure drama |
| Fire on the Amazon | Luis Llosa | Craig Sheffer, Sandra Bullock | United States; Peru | |
| Fong Sai-yuk | Corey Yuen | Jet Li, Adam Cheng, Josephine Siao Fong-fong | Hong Kong | Adventure comedy |
| Fong Sai-yuk II | Corey Yuen | Jet Li, Sibelle Hu, Amy Kwok | Hong Kong | Adventure comedy |
| Free Willy | Simon Wincer | Jason James Richter, Lori Petty, Jayne Atkinson | United States | Family-oriented adventure |
| The Fugitive | Andrew Davis | Harrison Ford, Tommy Lee Jones, Sela Ward, Julianne Moore, Joe Pantoliano | United States | |
| Green Snake | Tsui Hark | Maggie Cheung, Joey Wong, Zhao Wenzhuo | Hong Kong | Fantasy adventure |
| Heart of Darkness | Nicolas Roeg | John Malkovich, Tim Roth, Isaach De Bankolé, James Fox | United States | Adventure drama |
| The Heroic Trio | Johnnie To | Maggie Cheung, Michelle Yeoh, Anita Mui | Hong Kong | Fantasy adventure |
| Homeward Bound: The Incredible Journey | Duwayne Dunham | Robert Hays, Kim Greist, Jean Smart | United States | Family-oriented adventure |
| Huck and the King of Hearts | Michael Keusch | Chauncey Leopardi, Joe Piscopo, John Astin | United States | Family-oriented adventure |
| Hunt for the Blue Diamond | Otto Retzer | Barry Newman, Ernest Borgnine, Pierre Brice, Harald Leipnitz, Laura Johnson, Sonja Kirchberger, Brent Huff | Germany | |
| Into the West | Mike Newell | Gabriel Byrne, Ellen Barkin, Ciaran Fitzgerald | Ireland; United Kingdom; United States; Japan | Family-oriented adventure |
| Iron Monkey | Yuen Woo Ping | Yu Rongguang, Donnie Yen, Jean Wang | Hong Kong | |
| Justinien Trouvé ou le Bâtard de Dieu | Christian Fechner | Pierre-Olivier Mornas, Bernard-Pierre Donnadieu, Kathie Kriegel, Ticky Holgado | France | |
| Jurassic Park | Steven Spielberg | Sam Neill, Laura Dern, Jeff Goldblum, Richard Attenborough | United States | Science fiction adventure |
| Ordeal in the Arctic | Mark Sobel | Richard Chamberlain, Catherine Mary Stewart, Melanie Mayron, Scott Hylands, Page Fletcher | Canada | Arctic adventure |
| Puss in Boots | Richard Slapczynski | | Australia | Animated film |
| Quest of the Delta Knights | James Dodson | Corbin Allred, David Warner, Olivia Hussey | United States | |
| Robin Hood: Men in Tights | Mel Brooks | Cary Elwes, Richard Lewis | United States | Adventure comedy |
| The Sea Wolf | Michael Anderson | Charles Bronson, Christopher Reeve, Catherine Mary Stewart | United States | Sea adventure |
| Super Mario Bros. | Annabel Jankel, Rocky Morton | Bob Hoskins, John Leguizamo, Dennis Hopper | United States | Fantasy adventure |
| The Three Musketeers | Stephen Herek | Chris O'Donnell, Kiefer Sutherland, Charlie Sheen, Oliver Platt, Tim Curry, Rebecca De Mornay, Julie Delpy | United States | |
| Tropical Heat | Jag Mundhra | Maryam d'Abo, Rick Rossovich | United States | Romantic adventure, mystery |

== 1994 ==
| Title | Director | Cast | Country | Subgenre/Notes |
|---|---|---|---|---|
| The Ascent | Donald Shebib | Vincent Spano, Ben Cross, Rachel Ward | Canada; United States | War adventure, mountaineering adventure |
| Ashes of Time | Wong Kar-wai | Brigitte Lin, Leslie Cheung, Maggie Cheung | Hong Kong | |
| Baby's Day Out | Patrick Read Johnson | Joe Mantegna, Lara Flynn Boyle, Joe Pantoliano | United States | Family-oriented adventure |
| Cabin Boy | Adam Resnick | Chris Elliott, Ritch Brinkley, Melora Walters | United States | Adventure comedy, sea adventure |
| City Slickers II: The Legend of Curly's Gold | Paul Weiland | Billy Crystal, Jack Palance, Daniel Stern, Jon Lovitz | United States | Western, adventure comedy |
| Clear and Present Danger | Phillip Noyce | Harrison Ford, Willem Dafoe, Anne Archer, James Earl Jones | United States | |
| Good King Wenceslas | Michael Tuchner | Jonathan Brandis, Joan Fontaine, Stefanie Powers, Leo McKern | United States | |
| Gunmen | Deran Sarafian | Christopher Lambert, Mario Van Peebles, Denis Leary, Patrick Stewart | United States | Action adventure |
| Highlander III: The Sorcerer | Andy Morahan | Christopher Lambert, Mario Van Peebles, Deborah Kara Unger | Canada; United Kingdom; France | Fantasy adventure |
| Iron Will | Charles Haid | MacKenzie Astin, Kevin Spacey, David Ogden Stiers | United States | Adventure drama |
| The Jungle Book | Stephen Sommers | Jason Scott Lee, Sam Neill, Lena Heady | United States | Adventure drama |
| Lassie | Daniel Petrie | Tom Guiry, Helen Slater, Jon Tenney | United States | Family-oriented adventure |
| The Lion King | Roger Allers, Rob Minkoff | James Earl Jones (voice), Matthew Broderick (voice), Moira Kelly (voice) | United States | Animated film, family-oriented adventure |
| Little Indian, Big City | Hervé Palud | Thierry Lhermitte, Patrick Timsit, Ludwig Briand | France | Adventure comedy |
| Men of War | Perry Lang | Dolph Lundgren, Charlotte Lewis | United States | |
| No Escape | Martin Campbell | Ray Liotta, Lance Henriksen, Stuart Wilson, Kevin Dillon | United States | Action adventure, science fiction adventure |
| On Deadly Ground | Steven Seagal | Steven Seagal, Michael Caine, Joan Chen, R. Lee Ermey | United States | Arctic adventure, action adventure |
| The Pagemaster | Joe Johnston | Macaulay Culkin (voice), Christopher Lloyd (voice), Ed Begley, Jr. (voice), Mel Harris (voice) | United States | Live-action/animated film, fantasy adventure |
| Princess Caraboo | Michael Austin | Phoebe Cates, Jim Broadbent, Wendy Hughes | United Kingdom; United States | |
| The Return of Jafar | Tad Stones, Alan Zaslove | | United States | Animated film, family-oriented adventure |
| Revenge of the Musketeers | Bertrand Tavernier | Sophie Marceau, Philippe Noiret, Claude Rich, Sami Frey | France | |
| The River Wild | Curtis Hanson | Meryl Streep, Kevin Bacon, David Strathairn | United States | |
| The Secret of Roan Inish | John Sayles | Mick Lally, Eileen Colgan, John Lynch | United States | Adventure drama, fantasy adventure |
| Squanto: A Warrior's Tale | Xavier Koller | Adam Beach, Irene Bedard, Eric Schweig | United States | |
| Star Trek Generations | David Carson | Patrick Stewart, William Shatner, Malcolm McDowell | United States | Space adventure |
| Stargate | Roland Emmerich | Kurt Russell, James Spader, Jaye Davidson | United States | Science fiction adventure |
| Surviving the Game | Ernest Dickerson | Ice-T, Rutger Hauer, Gary Busey, F. Murray Abraham | United States | |
| Taxandria | Raoul Servais | Armin Mueller-Stahl, Richard Kattan, Elliott Spiers, Katja Studt | Belgium; Germany; France; Netherlands; Hungary | Fantasy adventure |
| White Fang 2: Myth of the White Wolf | Ken Olin | Ethan Hawke, Scott Bairstow | United States | Family-oriented adventure |

== 1995 ==
| Title | Director | Cast | Country | Subgenre/Notes |
|---|---|---|---|---|
| The Adventures of Captain Zoom in Outer Space | Max Tash | Nichelle Nichols, Ron Perlman | United States | Space adventure |
| The Amazing Panda Adventure | Christopher Cain | Stephen Lang, Ryan Slater | United States | Family-oriented adventure |
| Apollo 13 | Ron Howard | Tom Hanks, Bill Paxton, Kevin Bacon, Gary Sinise | United States | |
| Balto | Simon Wells | | United States | Animated film, family-oriented adventure |
| Batman Forever | Joel Schumacher | Val Kilmer, Tommy Lee Jones, Jim Carrey, Nicole Kidman, Chris O'Donnell | United States | |
| Beyond Rangoon | John Boorman | Patricia Arquette, U Aung Ko, Frances McDormand, Adelle Lutz | United States | Adventure drama |
| Braveheart | Mel Gibson | Mel Gibson, Patrick McGoohan, Sophie Marceau | United States | |
| The City of Lost Children | Marc Caro, Jean-Pierre Jeunet | Ron Perlman, Daniel Emilfork, Judith Vittet | France; Germany; Spain | Fantasy adventure |
| Congo | Frank Marshall | Dylan Walsh, Laura Linney, Ernie Hudson, Tim Curry, Joe Don Baker | United States | Adventure drama |
| Cutthroat Island | Renny Harlin | Geena Davis, Matthew Modine, Frank Langella | United States | Pirate film |
| Die Hard with a Vengeance | John McTiernan | Bruce Willis, Jeremy Irons, Samuel L. Jackson | United States | |
| Far From Home: The Adventures of Yellow Dog | Phillip Borsos | Mimi Rogers, Bruce Davison | United States | Family-oriented adventure |
| First Knight | Jerry Zucker | Sean Connery, Richard Gere, Julia Ormond, Ben Cross, John Gielgud | United States | Romantic adventure |
| Gold Diggers: The Secret of Bear Mountain | Kevin James Dobson | Christina Ricci, Anna Chlumsky | United States; Canada | |
| GoldenEye | Martin Campbell | Pierce Brosnan, Sean Bean, Izabella Scorupco, Famke Janssen | United Kingdom | |
| The Horseman on the Roof | Jean-Paul Rappeneau | Olivier Martinez, Juliette Binoche, Isabelle Carré | France | Romantic adventure |
| Jumanji | Joe Johnston | Robin Williams, Bonnie Hunt, Kirsten Dunst | United States | Fantasy adventure |
| Kidnapped | Ivan Passer | Armand Assante, Brian McCardie | United States | |
| Mortal Kombat | Paul W. S. Anderson | Robin Shou, Linden Ashby, Bridgette Wilson, Christopher Lambert, Talisa Soto | United States | Fantasy adventure |
| Napoleon | Mario Andreacchio | Jamie Croft (voice), Philip Quast (voice) | Australia; Japan | Family-oriented adventure |
| Pocahontas | Mike Gabriel, Eric Goldberg | Mel Gibson (voice), Irene Bedard (voice), David Ogden Stiers (voice) | United States | Animated film, family-oriented adventure |
| Rob Roy | Michael Caton-Jones | Liam Neeson, Jessica Lange, John Hurt, Tim Roth | United States | |
| Sahara | Brian Trenchard-Smith | Jim Belushi | United States; Australia | War adventure |
| Sleeping Beauty | Toshi Hiruma | Andrea Libman, Scott McNeil, Richard Newman | United States | Animated film, family-oriented adventure |
| Tom and Huck | Peter Hewitt | Jonathan Taylor Thomas, Brad Renfro, Michael McShane | United States | Family-oriented adventure |
| Toy Story | John Lasseter | Tom Hanks (voice), Tim Allen (voice), Jim Varney (voice) | United States | Animated film, family-oriented adventure |
| Waterworld | Kevin Reynolds | Kevin Costner, Dennis Hopper | United States | Sea adventure, science fiction adventure |
| Young Ivanhoe | Ralph L. Thomas | Kris Holden-Ried, Stacy Keach, Margot Kidder, Nick Mancuso | Canada; United Kingdom; France | |

== 1996 ==
| Title | Director | Cast | Country | Subgenre/Notes |
|---|---|---|---|---|
| 101 Dalmatians | Stephen Herek | Glenn Close, Jeff Daniels, Joely Richardson | United States | Adventure comedy, family-oriented adventure |
| Aladdin and the King of Thieves | Tad Stones | Scott Weinger (voice), Robin Williams (voice), John Rhys-Davies (voice), Linda Larkin (voice) | United States | Animated film, family-oriented adventure |
| Alaska | Fraser C. Heston | Thora Birch, Vincent Kartheiser, Dirk Benedict | United States | Family-oriented adventure |
| Beaumarchais | Édouard Molinaro | Fabrice Luchini, Sandrine Kiberlain, Manuel Blanc, Michel Serrault, Michel Piccoli, Jean-Claude Brialy | France | |
| The Conquest | Gábor Koltay | Franco Nero | Hungary | |
| Danger Zone | Allan Eastman | Billy Zane, Robert Downey Jr., Cary-Hiroyuki Tagawa, Ron Silver | United States; Canada; South Africa | |
| Dragonheart | Rob Cohen | Dennis Quaid, David Thewlis, Pete Postlethwaite | United States | Fantasy adventure |
| The English Patient | Anthony Minghella | Ralph Fiennes, Kristin Scott Thomas, Willem Dafoe, Juliette Binoche | United Kingdom; United States | Romantic adventure |
| Executive Decision | Stuart Baird | Kurt Russell, Steven Seagal | United States | |
| Flipper | Alan Shapiro | Paul Hogan, Elijah Wood | United States | Family-oriented adventure |
| Fly Away Home | Carroll Ballard | Jeff Daniels, Anna Paquin | United States; Canada; New Zealand | Family-oriented adventure |
| The Ghost and the Darkness | Stephen Hopkins | Michael Douglas, Val Kilmer, Tom Wilkinson | United States | Adventure drama |
| Homeward Bound II: Lost in San Francisco | David R. Ellis | | United States | Family-oriented adventure |
| Independence Day | Roland Emmerich | Will Smith, Jeff Goldblum, Bill Pullman | United States | |
| The Island of Dr. Moreau | John Frankenheimer | Marlon Brando, Val Kilmer, David Thewlis, Fairuza Balk, Temuera Morrison, Mark Dacascos, Ron Perlman | United States | |
| Le Jaguar | Francis Veber | Jean Reno, Patrick Bruel, Harrisson Lowe | France | Adventure comedy |
| Matilda | Danny DeVito | Mara Wilson, Danny DeVito, Rhea Perlman | United States | Family-oriented adventure |
| Mercenary | Avi Nesher | Olivier Gruner, John Ritter, Robert Culp, Ed Lauter, Martin Kove | United States | |
| Mission: Impossible | Brian De Palma | Tom Cruise, Emmanuelle Béart, Jean Reno, Jon Voight, Ving Rhames, Vanessa Redgrave | United States | |
| Muppet Treasure Island | Brian Henson | Tim Curry, Jennifer Saunders, Kevin Bishop | United States | Pirate film, adventure comedy, family-oriented adventure |
| The NeverEnding Story III | Peter MacDonald | Jason James Richter, Melody Kay | United States; Germany | Fantasy adventure, family-oriented adventure |
| North Star | Nils Gaup | Christopher Lambert, James Caan, Catherine McCormack, Burt Young | United States | |
| Out in the Open | Luis Armando Roche | Roy Dupuis, Christian Vadim, Carlos Cruz, Dora Mazzone, Wolfgang Preiss | Venezuela | |
| The Phantom | Simon Wincer | Billy Zane, Treat Williams, Kristy Swanson, Catherine Zeta-Jones, James Remar, Patrick McGoohan | United States; Australia | |
| Project Shadowchaser IV | Mark Roper | Frank Zagarino | United States | Science fiction adventure |
| The Quest | Jean-Claude Van Damme | Jean-Claude Van Damme, Roger Moore, James Remar | United States | |
| Space Jam | Joe Pytka | Michael Jordan, Wayne Knight | United States | |
| Star Trek: First Contact | Jonathan Frakes | Patrick Stewart, Jonathan Frakes, Brent Spiner | United States | Space adventure |
| Victory | Mark Peploe | Willem Dafoe, Sam Neill, Irène Jacob, Rufus Sewell, Jean Yanne, Irm Hermann | United Kingdom; France; Germany | |
| White Squall | Ridley Scott | Jeff Bridges, Caroline Goodall, John Savage | United States | Sea adventure, adventure drama |

== 1997 ==
| Title | Director | Cast | Country | Subgenre/Notes |
|---|---|---|---|---|
| 20,000 Leagues Under the Sea | Michael Anderson | Richard Crenna, Ben Cross | United States | Sea adventure, science fiction adventure |
| 20,000 Leagues Under the Sea | Rod Hardy | Michael Caine, Patrick Dempsey, Mia Sara, Bryan Brown | United States; Australia | Sea adventure |
| Amistad | Steven Spielberg | Morgan Freeman, Djimon Hounsou, Anthony Hopkins, Matthew McConaughey | United States | |
| Anaconda | Luis Llosa | Jennifer Lopez, Ice Cube, Jon Voight, Eric Stoltz, Owen Wilson | United States | Horror adventure |
| El aroma del Copal | Antonio Gonzalo | James Brolin, Jay Roberts Jr., Seidy López | Spain; United States | |
| Austin Powers: International Man of Mystery | Jay Roach | Mike Myers, Elizabeth Hurley, Michael York | United States | |
| Batman & Robin | Joel Schumacher, Peter MacDonald | Arnold Schwarzenegger, George Clooney, Chris O'Donnell, Uma Thurman, Alicia Silverstone | United States; United Kingdom | |
| The Call of the Wild: Dog of the Yukon | Peter Svatek | Rutger Hauer | United States | |
| Dante's Peak | Roger Donaldson | Pierce Brosnan, Linda Hamilton, Charles Hallahan | United States | Adventure drama |
| Dark Planet | Albert Magnoli | Paul Mercurio, Harley Jane Kozak, Michael York | United States | Space adventure |
| The Edge | Lee Tamahori | Anthony Hopkins, Alec Baldwin, Elle Macpherson | United States | Adventure drama |
| Eye of the Eagle | Peter Flinth | Nijas Ørnbak-Fjeldmose, Lasse Baunkilde | Denmark | |
| The Fifth Element | Luc Besson | Bruce Willis, Milla Jovovich, Gary Oldman, Ian Holm | France | Space adventure |
| Forbidden Territory: Stanley's Search for Livingstone | Simon Langton | Aidan Quinn, Nigel Hawthorne, Kabir Bedi, Edward Fox | United States | |
| Into Thin Air: Death on Everest | Robert Markowitz | Nathaniel Parker, Richard Jenkins, Peter Horton | United States | Adventure drama |
| Joey | Ian Barry | Jamie Croft, Alex McKenna, Rebecca Gibney | Australia | Family-oriented adventure |
| A Kid in Aladdin's Palace | Robert L. Levy | Thomas Ian Nicholas, Rhona Mitra, Nicholas Irons | United States | Fantasy adventure, family-oriented adventure |
| Kull the Conqueror | John Nicolella | Kevin Sorbo, Tia Carrere, Thomas Ian Griffith | United States | Fantasy adventure |
| Legend of the Lost Tomb | Jonathan Winfrey | Stacy Keach, Brock Pierce, Kimberlee Peterson, Rick Rossovich | United States | Family-oriented adventure |
| The Lost World: Jurassic Park | Steven Spielberg | Jeff Goldblum, Julianne Moore, Pete Postlethwaite, Arliss Howard | United States | Science fiction adventure |
| Men in Black | Barry Sonnenfeld | Tommy Lee Jones, Will Smith | United States | |
| Mortal Kombat Annihilation | John R. Leonetti | Robin Shou, Talisa Soto, James Remar | United States | Fantasy adventure |
| On Guard | Philippe de Broca | Daniel Auteuil, Fabrice Luchini, Vincent Perez, Marie Gillain, Philippe Noiret | France; Italy; Germany | |
| Passion in the Desert | Lavinia Currier | Ben Daniels, Michel Piccoli | United States | |
| Paws | Karl Zwicky | Billy Connolly, Nathan Cavaleri | Australia | Family-oriented adventure |
| The Postman | Kevin Costner | Kevin Costner | United States | |
| Prince Valiant | Anthony Hickox | Stephen Moyer, Katherine Heigl, Thomas Kretschmann, Edward Fox, Udo Kier, Joanna Lumley, Ron Perlman | Ireland; United Kingdom; Germany | |
| Princess Mononoke | Hayao Miyazaki | | Japan | Animated film, fantasy adventure |
| Robinson Crusoe | Rod Hardy, George T. Miller | Pierce Brosnan, William Takaku | United States | Adventure drama |
| The Second Jungle Book: Mowgli & Baloo | Duncan McLachlan | Jamie Williams, Billy Campbell, Roddy McDowall | United States | Family-oriented adventure |
| Seven Years in Tibet | Jean-Jacques Annaud | Brad Pitt | United States | |
| Solomon | Roger Young | Ben Cross | United States | |
| Starship Troopers | Paul Verhoeven | Casper Van Dien, Dina Meyer, Denise Richards | United States | War adventure, space adventure |
| Titanic | James Cameron | Leonardo DiCaprio, Kate Winslet, Billy Zane | United States | Sea adventure |
| Tomorrow Never Dies | Roger Spottiswoode | Pierce Brosnan, Jonathan Pryce, Michelle Yeoh, Teri Hatcher | United Kingdom; United States | |
| True Heart | Catherine Cyran | Kirsten Dunst, Zachery Ty Bryan, August Schellenberg | United States | Family-oriented adventure |
| Twilight of the Ice Nymphs | Guy Maddin | Pascale Bussières, Nigel Whitmey, Shelley Duvall | Canada | Fantasy adventure |
| Zeus and Roxanne | George Miller | Steve Guttenberg, Kathleen Quinlan, Arnold Vosloo | United States | Family-oriented adventure, adventure comedy |

== 1998 ==
| Title | Director | Cast | Country | Subgenre/Notes |
|---|---|---|---|---|
| Almost Heroes | Christopher Guest | Chris Farley, Matthew Perry | United States | Adventure comedy |
| An American Tail: The Treasure of Manhattan Island | Larry Latham | | United States | Animated film, family-oriented adventure |
| Armageddon | Michael Bay | Bruce Willis, Billy Bob Thornton, Ben Affleck, Liv Tyler | United States | |
| A Bug's Life | John Lasseter, Andrew Stanton | Dave Foley (voice), Kevin Spacey (voice), Julia Louis-Dreyfus (voice) | United States | Animated film, family-oriented adventure |
| Don Juan | Jacques Weber | Jacques Weber, Emmanuelle Béart, Penélope Cruz, Michael Lonsdale, Michel Boujenah | France | |
| Fear and Loathing in Las Vegas | Terry Gilliam | Johnny Depp, Benicio del Toro, Tobey Maguire, Christina Ricci, Ellen Barkin, Gary Busey | United States | |
| Frenchman's Creek | Ferdinand Fairfax | Tara Fitzgerald, Anthony Delon | United Kingdom | |
| The Garden of Eden | Alessandro D'Alatri | Kim Rossi Stuart | Italy | |
| Goldrush: A Real Life Alaskan Adventure | John Power | Alyssa Milano, Bruce Campbell | United States | |
| The Herd | Peter Lynch | Colm Feore | Canada | Docudrama |
| Hideous Kinky | Gillies MacKinnon | Kate Winslet, Saïd Taghmaoui, Pierre Clémenti | United States | Adventure drama |
| The Incredible Adventures of Marco Polo | George Erschbamer | Don Diamont, Oliver Reed, Jack Palance | United States; Ukraine | |
| Kirikou and the Sorceress | Michel Ocelot | | France; Belgium; Luxembourg | Animated film, fantasy adventure |
| Legionnaire | Peter MacDonald | Jean-Claude Van Damme, Steven Berkoff | United States | |
| The Lion King II: Simba's Pride | Darrell Rooney, Rob LaDuca | Matthew Broderick (voice), Moira Kelly (voice), Neve Campbell (voice) | United States | Animated film, family-oriented adventure |
| Lost in Space | Stephen Hopkins | William Hurt, Mimi Rogers, Heather Graham, Gary Oldman | United States | Space adventure |
| The Man in the Iron Mask | Randall Wallace | Leonardo DiCaprio, Jeremy Irons, John Malkovich, Gérard Depardieu, Gabriel Byrne, Anne Parillaud | United States | Adventure drama |
| The Mask of Zorro | Martin Campbell | Antonio Banderas, Anthony Hopkins, Catherine Zeta-Jones | United States | |
| McCinsey's Island | Sam Firstenberg | Hulk Hogan, Grace Jones, Robert Vaughn | United States | |
| Mercenary II: Thick & Thin | Philippe Mora | Olivier Gruner, Robert Townsend, Nicholas Turturro | United States | |
| Merlin | Steve Barron | Sam Neill, Miranda Richardson, Isabella Rossellini, Martin Short, Paul Curran, Helena Bonham Carter, Rutger Hauer, James Earl Jones, John Gielgud | United States | Fantasy adventure |
| Mulan | Barry Cook, Tony Bancroft | Ming-Na Wen, Eddie Murphy, BD Wong | United States | Animated film |
| The New Swiss Family Robinson | Stewart Raffill | Jane Seymour, James Keach, David Carradine | United States | Sea adventure |
| Pocahontas II: Journey to a New World | Tom Ellery, Bradley Raymond | Billy Zane (voice), Irene Bedard (voice), David Ogden Stiers (voice) | United States | Animated film, family-oriented adventure |
| The Prince of Egypt | Brenda Chapman, Steve Hickner, Simon Wells | Val Kilmer (voice), Ralph Fiennes (voice), Michelle Pfeiffer (voice), Sandra Bullock (voice) | United States | |
| The Real Macaw | Mario Andreacchio | Jason Robards, Jamie Croft, Deborra-Lee Furness, John Goodman (voice) | Australia | Family-oriented adventure |
| Running Wild | Timothy Bond | Gregory Harrison, Lori Hallier, Simon MacCorkindale | United States | Family-oriented adventure |
| Secret of the Andes | Alejandro Azzano | Camilla Belle, David Keith, Nancy Allen, Roshan Seth, John Rhys-Davies | Argentina; United States | Family-oriented adventure |
| Six Days, Seven Nights | Ivan Reitman | Harrison Ford, Anne Heche | United States | Adventure comedy |
| Sphere | Barry Levinson | Dustin Hoffman, Sharon Stone, Samuel L. Jackson | United States | Science fiction adventure, sea adventure |
| Star Trek: Insurrection | Jonathan Frakes | Patrick Stewart, Jonathan Frakes, Brent Spiner | United States | Space adventure |
| Tarzan and the Lost City | Carl Schenkel | Casper Van Dien, Jane March | Germany; United States; Australia | |
| La vuelta de El Coyote | Mario Camus | José Coronado, Nigel Davenport | Spain | |

== 1999 ==
| Title | Director | Cast | Country | Subgenre/Notes |
|---|---|---|---|---|
| The 13th Warrior | John McTiernan | Antonio Banderas, Omar Sharif | United States | |
| The Adventures of Elmo in Grouchland | Gary Halvorson | | United States; Germany | Family-oriented adventure |
| Arthur's Quest | Neil Mandt | Eric Christian Olsen, Arye Gross, Catherine Oxenberg, Alexandra Paul, Clint Howard, Zach Galligan | United States | Fantasy adventure, family-oriented adventure |
| Asterix & Obelix Take On Caesar | Claude Zidi | Christian Clavier, Gérard Depardieu, Laetitia Casta, Roberto Benigni, Gottfried John | France; Germany; Italy | Adventure comedy |
| The Astronaut's Wife | Rand Ravich | Johnny Depp, Charlize Theron | United States | |
| Austin Powers: The Spy Who Shagged Me | Jay Roach | Mike Myers, Heather Graham, Will Ferrell | United States | |
| Captive in Yemen | Peter Patzak | Peter Maffay | Germany | |
| Deep Blue Sea | Renny Harlin | Thomas Jane, Saffron Burrows, Samuel L. Jackson | United States | Sea adventure |
| The Frenchman's Son | Gérard Lauzier | Fanny Ardant, Josiane Balasko, David-Alexandre Parquier | France | Adventure comedy |
| Galaxy Quest | Dean Parisot | Tim Allen, Sigourney Weaver, Alan Rickman, Tony Shalhoub | United States | |
| The Iron Giant | Brad Bird | Jennifer Aniston, Harry Connick Jr., Vin Diesel | United States | Family-oriented adventure, science fiction adventure |
| The Messenger: The Story of Joan of Arc | Luc Besson | Milla Jovovich, Vincent Cassel, Faye Dunaway, Dustin Hoffman | France | |
| The Mummy | Stephen Sommers | Brendan Fraser, Rachel Weisz, John Hannah, Arnold Vosloo | United States | Adventure comedy |
| Muppets from Space | Tim Hill | Andie MacDowell, F. Murray Abraham, Hulk Hogan | United States | Adventure comedy, family-oriented adventure, science fiction adventure |
| Plunkett & Macleane | Jake Scott | Robert Carlyle, Jonny Lee Miller, Liv Tyler, Alan Cumming | United States | |
| Star Wars: Episode I – The Phantom Menace | George Lucas | Ewan McGregor, Liam Neeson, Natalie Portman | United States | Space adventure |
| Tarzan | Chris Buck, Kevin Lima | | United States | Animated film, family-oriented adventure |
| Three Kings | David O. Russell | George Clooney, Mark Wahlberg, Ice Cube | United States | War adventure |
| To Walk with Lions | Carl Schultz | Richard Harris, Ian Bannen, Honor Blackman, Geraldine Chaplin, John Michie | Canada; United Kingdom; Kenya | |
| Toy Story 2 | John Lasseter, Lee Unkrich, Ash Brannon | Tom Hanks (voice), Tim Allen (voice), Joan Cusack (voice) | United States | Animated film, family-oriented adventure |
| Treasure Island | Peter Rowe | Jack Palance | Canada; United Kingdom | Sea adventure |
| Virus | John Bruno | Jamie Lee Curtis, Donald Sutherland, William Baldwin, Joanna Pacuła | United States | Science fiction adventure, sea adventure |
| The Vivero Letter | H. Gordon Boos | Robert Patrick, Fred Ward, Chiara Caselli | United States | |
| Wild Wild West | Barry Sonnenfeld | Will Smith, Kevin Kline, Kenneth Branagh, Salma Hayek | United States | |
| With Fire and Sword | Jerzy Hoffman | Izabella Scorupco, Michał Żebrowski, Aleksandr Domogarov, Daniel Olbrychski | Poland | |
| The World Is Not Enough | Michael Apted | Pierce Brosnan, Sophie Marceau, Robert Carlyle, Denise Richards, Judi Dench, Robbie Coltrane | United Kingdom | |
