= Bedhead =

Bedhead may refer to:

- Bed Head, a range of haircare products
- Bedhead (band), a Texas-based indie rock band active in the 1990s
- BedHead, a 2014 Australian web series broadcast by ABC iview
- Bedhead (album), a 2021 album by British alternative rock band bar italia
- Bedhead (film), a 1991 short film made by director Robert Rodriguez
- Headboard (furniture), a piece of furniture that attaches to the head of a bed
