= List of fantasy films of the 1990s =

A list of fantasy films released in the 1990s.

== List ==
Title	Director	Cast	Country	Notes
1990
Les 1001 Nuits	Philippe de Broca	Catherine Zeta-Jones, Thierry Lhermitte, Gérard Jugnot	France	Fantasy comedy
A Chinese Ghost Story Part II	Ching Siu Tung	Leslie Cheung, Joey Wong, Michelle Reis	Hong Kong	
Don Juan, Mi Querido Fantasma	Antonio Mercero	Juan Luis Galiardo, María Barranco, Verónica Forqué	Spain	
Dreams	Akira Kurosawa	Akira Terao, Martin Scorsese, Mitsunori Isaki, Chishū Ryū	Japan; United States	
Edward Scissorhands	Tim Burton	Johnny Depp, Winona Ryder, Dianne Wiest	United States	Gothic romantic science fiction
Erotic Ghost Story	Ngai Kai-Lam	Leslie Cheung	Hong Kong	
Ghost	Jerry Zucker	Patrick Swayze, Demi Moore, Whoopi Goldberg, Tony Goldwyn	United States	
Ghost Dad	Sidney Poitier	Bill Cosby, Kimberly Russell, Denise Nicholas	United States	
Heart Condition	James D. Parriott	Bob Hoskins, Denzel Washington, Chloe Webb	United States	
Little Nemo: Adventures in Slumberland	Masami Hata and William T. Hurtz	Gabriel Damon, Mickey Rooney, Bernard Erhard, Laura Mooney	Japan, United States	
Mr. Destiny	James Orr	James Belushi, Michael Caine, Linda Hamilton	United States	
Nouvelle Vague	Jean-Luc Godard	Alain Delon, Domiziana Giordano, Roland Amstutz	France; Switzerland	
The Nutcracker Prince	Paul Schibli		Canada	
Quest for the Mighty Sword	Joe D'Amato	Eric Allan Kramer, Margaret Lenzey, Donald O'Brien	Italy	
The Rescuers Down Under	Hendel Butoy, Mike Gabriel		United States	Animated film
Saga of the Phoenix	Ngai Kai Lam, Sze Yu Lau	Gloria Yip, Yuen Biao, Hiroshi Abe	Hong Kong	
Teenage Mutant Ninja Turtles	Steven Barron	Judith Hoag, Elias Koteas, Ray Serra	United States	
Wings of Fame	Otakar Votocek	Peter O'Toole, Colin Firth	Netherlands	
The Witches	Nicolas Roeg	Anjelica Huston, Mai Zetterling, Jasen Fisher	United Kingdom; United States	
1991
Beastmaster 2: Through the Portal of Time	Sylvio Tabet	Marc Singer, Kari Wührer, Wings Hauser	United States	
Beauty and the Beast	Gary Trousdale, Kirk Wise		United States	Animated film
Bill & Ted's Bogus Journey	Peter Hewitt	Keanu Reeves, Alex Winter, Bill Sadler	United States	
Cast a Deadly Spell	Martin Campbell	Fred Ward, Julianne Moore, Clancy Brown	United States	Television film
Defending Your Life	Albert Brooks	Albert Brooks, Meryl Streep, Rip Torn	United States	
Delirious	Tom Mankiewicz	John Candy, Mariel Hemingway, Emma Samms	United States	
The Double Life of Veronique	Krzysztof Kieslowski	Irène Jacob	Poland; France	
Fantaghirò	Lamberto Bava	Alessandra Martines	Italy	
The Fisher King	Terry Gilliam	Robin Williams, Jeff Bridges, Mercedes Ruehl	United States	
Hook	Steven Spielberg	Robin Williams, Dustin Hoffman, Julia Roberts	United States	
The NeverEnding Story II: The Next Chapter	George T. Miller	Jonathan Brandis, Clarissa Burt	United States; Germany	
The Polar Bear King	Ola Solum	Jack Fjeldstad, Maria Bonnevie, Tobias Hoesl,	Norway; Germany	Also called Kvitebjørn Kong Valemon
Prospero's Books	Peter Greenaway	John Gielgud, Michael Clark, Michel Blanc	United Kingdom; France	
Truly, Madly, Deeply	Anthony Minghella	Juliet Stevenson, Alan Rickman, Bill Paterson	United Kingdom	
Wizards of the Demon Sword	Fred Olen Ray	Blake Bahmer, Lyle Waggoner, Heidi Paine	United States	
1992
Aladdin	Ron Clements, John Musker		United States	Animated film
Army of Darkness	Sam Raimi	Bruce Campbell, Embeth Davidtz, Marcus Gilbert	United States	
Death Becomes Her	Robert Zemeckis	Meryl Streep, Goldie Hawn, Bruce Willis	United States	
Doctor Mordrid	Albert Band, Charles Band	Jeffrey Combs, Jay Acovone, Brian Thompson, Yvette Nipar	United States	
Fantaghirò 2	Lamberto Bava	Alessandra Martines	Italy	
FernGully: The Last Rainforest	Bill Kroyer	Jonathan Ward, Samantha Mathis, Tim Curry	United States; Australia	
Freddie as F.R.O.7	Jon Acevski		United States; United Kingdom	Animated film
Into the West	Mike Newell	Gabriel Byrne, Ciaran Fitzgerald, Ruaidhri Conroy	Ireland	
Orlando	Sally Potter	Tilda Swinton, Billy Zane, Lothaire Bluteau	United Kingdom; Italy; France; Netherlands	
Porco Rosso	Hayao Miyazaki		Japan	Anime film
Prelude to a Kiss	Norman Rene	Alec Baldwin, Meg Ryan, Kathy Bates	Jamaica; United States	
1993
The Bride With White Hair	Philip Kwok, Ronny Yu	Brigitte Lin, Leslie Cheung, Nam Kit-Ying	Hong Kong	
The Bride with White Hair 2	Ronny Yu, David Wu	Sunny Chan, Christy Chung, Joey Maan Yee-man	Hong Kong	
Double, Double, Toil and Trouble	Stuart Margolin	Mary-Kate Olsen, Ashley Olsen	United States	
Fantaghirò 3	Lamberto Bava	Alessandra Martines	Italy	
Green Snake	Tsui Hark	Maggie Cheung, Joey Wong, Zhao Wenzhuo	Hong Kong	
Groundhog Day	Harold Ramis	Bill Murray, Andie MacDowell, Chris Elliott	United States	
Heart and Souls	Ron Underwood	Robert Downey Jr., Charles Grodin, Alfre Woodard	United States	
Hocus Pocus	Kenny Ortega	Bette Midler, Sarah Jessica Parker, Kathy Najimy	United States	
Last Action Hero	John McTiernan	Arnold Schwarzenegger, Austin O'Brien, F. Murray Abraham	United States	
Legend of the Liquid Sword			Hong Kong	
The Nightmare Before Christmas	Henry Selick		United States	Stop-motion film
Ninja Scroll	Yoshiaki Kawajiri		Japan	Anime film
The Secret Garden	Agnieszka Holland	Kate Maberly, Maggie Smith	United Kingdom	
Super Mario Bros.	Annabel Jankel, Rocky Morton	Bob Hoskins, John Leguizamo, Dennis Hopper	United States	
Teenage Mutant Ninja Turtles III	Stuart Gillard	Elias Koteas, Paige Turco, Stuart Wilson	United States	
Les Visiteurs	Jean-Marie Poire	Christian Clavier, Jean Reno, Valérie Lemercier	France	
Wishman	Mike Marvin	Paul Le Mat, Geoffrey Lewis, Paul Gleason, Quin Kessler	United States	
Zero Patience	John Greyson	John Robinson, Dianne Heatherington, Bernard Behrens	Canada	
1994
The Princess and the Goblin	József Gémes	Joss Ackland, Claire Bloom, Roy Kinnear, Sally Ann Marsh	United States	Animated film
Thumbelina	Don Bluth, Gary Goldma	Jodi Benson, Gino Conforti, Barbara Cook	United States	Animated film
The Crow	Alex Proyas	Brandon Lee, Ernie Hudson, Michael Wincott	United States	
Faust	Jan Švankmajer		Czech Republic; France; United Kingdom; Germany	Stop-motion film
North	Rob Reiner	Elijah Wood, Bruce Willis, Jon Lovitz	United States	
Pom Poko	Isao Takahata		Japan	Anime film
The Lion King	Roger Allers, Rob Minkoff		United States	Animated film
The Mask	Chuck Russell	Jim Carrey, Cameron Diaz, Peter Riegert	United States	
The NeverEnding Story III	Peter MacDonald	Jason James Richter, Melody Kay, Freddie Jones	United Kingdom; Germany	
The Pagemaster	Joe Johnston	Macaulay Culkin, Christopher Lloyd, Ed Begley, Jr.	United States	Animated film
The Santa Clause	John Pasquin, Bill Elvin	Tim Allen, Judge Reinhold, Wendy Crewson	United States	
The Swan Princess	Richard Rich		United States	Animated film
1995
Babe	Chris Noonan	James Cromwell, Magda Szubanski	Australia	
The City of Lost Children	Marc Caro, Jean-Pierre Jeunet	Ron Perlman, Daniel Emilfork, Judith Vittet	France; Spain; Germany	
Casper	Brad Silberling	Christina Ricci, Bill Pullman, Cathy Moriarty	United States	
Don't Die Without Telling Me Where You're Going	Eliseo Subiela	Darío Grandinetti, Mariana Arias	Argentina	
The Indian in the Cupboard	Frank Oz	Hal Scardino, Litefoot, Lindsay Crouse	United States	
Jumanji	Joe Johnston	Robin Williams, Bonnie Hunt, Kirsten Dunst	United States	
A Kid in King Arthur's Court	Michael Gottlieb	Debora Weston, Barry Stanton, Shane Rimmer	United States	
Memories	Katsuhiro Otomo, Koji Morimoto, Tensai Okamura		Japan	Anime film
Mighty Morphin Power Rangers: The Movie	Bryan Spicer	Karen Ashley, Johnny Yong Bosch, Steve Cardenas	United States	
Mortal Kombat	Paul W. S. Anderson	Robin Shou, Linden Ashby, Bridgette Wilson	United States	
Rough Magic	Clare Peploe	Bridget Fonda, Russell Crowe, Jim Broadbent	France; United Kingdom	
Slayers The Motion Picture	Kazuo Yamazaki		Japan	Anime film
Sleeping Beauty	Toshi Hiruma	Andrea Libman, Scott McNeil, Richard Newman	United States	Animated film, family-oriented adventure
Toy Story	John Lasseter		United States	Animated film
1996
101 Dalmatians	Stephen Herek	Glenn Close	United States	
The Adventures of Pinocchio	Steven Barron	Martin Landau; Jonathan Taylor Thomas; Udo Kier	United States; United Kingdom; France; Germany	
The Craft	Andrew Fleming	Fairuza Balk, Neve Campbell, Robin Tunney	United States	
The Crow: City of Angels	Tim Pope	Vincent Perez, Mia Kirshner, Richard Brooks	United States	
Dragonheart	Rob Cohen	Dennis Quaid, David Thewlis, Pete Postlethwaite	United States	
The Hunchback of Notre Dame	Gary Trousdale, Kirk Wise	Tom Hulce, Demi Moore, Tony Jay, Kevin Kline, Paul Kandel, Jason Alexander, Charles Kimbrough, Mary Wickes, David Ogden Stiers	United States	Animated film
Jack	Francis Ford Coppola	Robin Williams, Diane Lane, Jennifer Lopez, Bill Cosby	United States	
James and the Giant Peach	Henry Selick	Paul Terry, Simon Callow, Richard Dreyfuss	United States	Stop-motion film
Kazaam	Paul Michael Glaser	Shaquille O'Neal, Francis Capra, Ally Walker	United States	
Matilda	Danny DeVito	Mara Wilson, Danny DeVito, Rhea Perlman	United States	
Phenomenon	Jon Turteltaub	John Travolta, Kyra Sedgwick, Forest Whitaker	United States	
The Preacher's Wife	Penny Marshall	Denzel Washington, Whitney Houston, Courtney Vance	United States	
Slayers Return	Kunihiko Yuyama		Japan	Anime film
To the Ends of time	Markus Rothkranz	Joss Ackland, Christine Taylor, Tom Schultz, Sarah Douglas	United States	
1997
The Borrowers	Peter Hewitt	John Goodman, Jim Broadbent, Mark Williams	United Kingdom	Film remake
FairyTale: A True Story	Charles Sturridge	Florence Hoath, Peter O'Toole, Elizabeth Earl	United Kingdom	
Flubber	Les Mayfield	Robin Williams, Marcia Gay Harden, Christopher McDonald	United States	
Hercules	Ron Clements, John Musker		United States	Animated film
A Life Less Ordinary	Danny Boyle	Ewan McGregor, Cameron Diaz, Holly Hunter	United Kingdom	
Princess Mononoke	Hayao Miyazaki		Japan	Anime film
Kull the Conqueror	John Nicolella	Kevin Sorbo, Tia Carrere, Thomas Ian Griffith	United States	
Mortal Kombat Annihilation	John R. Leonetti	Robin Shou, Talisa Soto, James Remar	United States	
Photographing Fairies	Nick Willing	Toby Stephens, Emily Woof, Ben Kingsley	United Kingdom	
A Simple Wish	Michael Ritchie	Martin Short, Mara Wilson, Francis Capra, Kathleen Turner	United States	
Slayers Great	Kunihiko Yuyama		Japan	Anime film
Snow White: A Tale of Terror	Michael Cohn	Sigourney Weaver, Sam Neill, Monica Keena	United States	
Spawn	Mark A.Z. Dippé	John Leguizamo, Michael Jai White, Martin Sheen	United States	
Twilight of the Ice Nymphs	Guy Maddin	Pascale Bussières, Nigel Whitmey, Shelley Duvall	Canada	
Warriors of Virtue	Ronny Yu	Angus MacFadyen, Mario Yedidia, Marley Shelton	United States	
1998
A Bug's Life	John Lasseter, Andrew Stanton		United States	Animated film
A Very Unlucky Leprechaun	Brian Kelly	Warwick Davis, Danielle Lombardi, Stephanie Lombardi	Ireland; United States	
After Life	Hirokazu Koreeda	Arata, Erika Oda, Susumu Terajima	Japan	
Antz	Eric Darnell, Tim Johnson		United States	Animated film
Babe: Pig in the City	George Miller	Magda Szubanski, James Cromwell, Mary Stein	United States	
Blade	Stephen Norrington	Wesley Snipes, Stephen Dorff, Kris Kristofferson	United States	
City of Angels	Brad Silberling	Nicolas Cage, Meg Ryan, Andre Braugher	United States	
Jacob Two Two Meets the Hooded Fang	George Bloomfield	Gary Busey, Miranda Richardson, Ice-T	Canada	
Kirikou and the Sorceress	Michel Ocelot	Doudou Gueye Thiaw, Maimouna N'Diaye, Awa Sene Sarr	France	Animated film
Meet Joe Black	Martin Brest	Brad Pitt, Anthony Hopkins, Claire Forlani	United States	
Practical Magic	Griffin Dunne	Sandra Bullock, Nicole Kidman	United States	
Quest for Camelot	Frederik Du Chau		United States	Animated film
Sliding Doors	Peter Howitt	Gwyneth Paltrow, John Hannah, John Lynch	United States	
Slayers Gorgeous	Hiroshi Watanabe		Japan	Anime film
Small Soldiers	Joe Dante	Frank Langella, Tommy Lee Jones, Ernest Borgnine	United States	Science fiction
The Storm Riders	Andrew Lau	Aaron Kwok, Ekin Cheng, Sonny Chiba	Hong Kong	
What Dreams May Come	Vincent Ward	Robin Williams, Cuba Gooding, Jr., Annabella Sciorra	United States	
The Wolves of Kromer	Will Gould	Lee Williams, James Layton, Rita Davies	United Kingdom	
1999
The 13th Warrior	John McTiernan	Antonio Banderas, Diane Venora, Dennis Storhoi	Canada; United States	
Being John Malkovich	Spike Jonze	John Cusack, Cameron Diaz, Catherine Keener	United States	
Dogma	Kevin Smith	Ben Affleck, Matt Damon, Linda Fiorentino	United States	
Fantasia 2000	Various directors		United States	Animated film
The Green Mile	Frank Darabont	Tom Hanks, David Morse, Bonnie Hunt	United States	
The Mummy	Stephen Sommers	Brendan Fraser, Rachel Weisz, John Hannah, Arnold Vosloo	United States	
Mystery Men	Kinka Usher	Ben Stiller, Hank Azaria, William H. Macy	United States	
Tarzan	Chris Buck, Kevin Lima		United States	Animated film
Toy Story 2	John Lasseter, Lee Unkrich, Ash Brannon		United States	Animated film
Tuvalu	Veit Helmer	Denis Lavant, Chulpan Khamatova, Philippe Clay	Germany	
