= Petra Yared =

Australian actress

- Born: Petra Georgina Yared; 18 January 1979 (age 47); Melbourne, Victoria, Australia
- Occupation: Actress
- Years active: 1993-present

Petra Georgina Yared (born 18 January 1979) is an Australian actress. She has also been credited as Petra Jared.

== Early life ==
Yared was born in Melbourne to Rick and Shelley, having an older sister, Sara, and younger brother, Nicholas. Yared is of Lebanese descent. At nine, she took part in acting workshops at the National Theatre in Melbourne, going on to audition and gain small television roles. She graduated with a Bachelor of Arts degree in History from the University of Melbourne, specialising in the history of the Middle East.

She began her career in children's television series including Sky Trackers and The Genie From Down Under 2.

== Career ==
With a major role as Jo Tiegan, in the Australian-New Zealand television production Mirror, Mirror, she won the Australian Film Institute award for Best New Talent.

In 1996, she appeared in Neighbours as Georgia ("George") Brown. She returned to the soap in late 2007 in the recurring role of Mia Silvani.

Yared also had significant roles in series including Blue Heelers and The Secret Life of Us, and guest roles on All Saints (2008), City Homicide (2010), Rescue (2011) and Crownies (2011).

From 2002 to 2005, she was a main cast member on MDA, playing a friendly receptionist who was of the Baháʼí Faith. She plays FOCA analyst Joanne Peters, in Underbelly, episode "Badness".

Appearances in films include The Real Macaw and Journey to the Center of the Earth (1999).

She appeared in the Melbourne Theatre Company's stage production of Pride and Prejudice in Melbourne in 1999.

On being an actress, she says "I never know what type of role will appeal to me until I read the script, and then it's usually an instinctive response. I sometimes just 'get' the character immediately and I know how I want to play her". Being an actress, she says, allows her to explore different worlds, "whether it's trying to understand the psychology of someone suffering from post-traumatic stress disorder or researching a different religion or learning how to fire a gun."

== Personal life ==
Yared is married to actor and playwright Travis Cotton. The couple have two children, Theodore (born 2011) and Vivien (born 2013). They live in Melbourne.

== Filmography ==
=== Film ===
Year	Title	Role	Type
1998	The Real Macaw	Kathy Girdis	Feature film
2000	Muggers	Sophie	Feature film
2001	Sparky D Comes to Town	Emma	TV movie
2002	Holding Your Breath	Voice	Short film
2002	Blurred	Yolanda the Limo Girl	Feature film
2022	Slant	Elizabeth	Short film

=== Television ===
Year	Title	Role	Type
1990	Choices		TV miniseries
1993	RFDS	Sarah Aldridge	TV series, 1 episode
1993	The Late Show	Jo, aged 14	TV series, 1 episode
1994	Law of the Land	Caroline Rodwell	TV series, 1 episode
1994	Sky Trackers	Nikki Colbert	TV series, 26 episodes
1995	Mirror, Mirror	Josephine 'Jo' Tiegan	TV series, 20 episodes
1995	Eat My Shorts	Debbie	TV series, 1 episode
1996	Ocean Girl	Patti	TV series, 1 episode
1997	Good Guys Bad Guys	Taylor	TV series, 1 episode
1998	The Genie From Down Under 2	Marcia Huntly	TV series, 8 episodes
1999	Halifax f.p.	Alicia Polk	TV series, season 4 episode 3: A Murder of Crows
1999	Journey to the Center of the Earth	Ralna	TV miniseries, 2 episodes
1994-99	Blue Heelers	Molly Malloy / Debbie Perkins / Kym Stewart	TV series, 4 episodes
2002	BeastMaster	Alima	TV series, 1 episode
2002-05	MDA	Layla Young	TV series, 56 episodes
2001-05	The Secret Life of Us	Shannon / Ingrid	TV series, 4 episodes
1996-2008	Neighbours	Georgia 'George' Brown / Mia Silvani	TV series, 37 episodes
2008	All Saints	Rhiannon Wilson	TV series, 11 episodes
2010	Cops LAC	Marielle	TV series, 1 episode
2007-10	City Homicide	Megan Chisholm-Walsh / Michelle Johnson	TV series, 2 episodes
2011	The Jesters	Mickey	TV series, 1 episode
2011	Rescue Special Ops	Zoe Hulme	TV series, 5 episodes
2011	Crownies	Paula Corvini	TV series, 8 episodes
2012	Underbelly Badness	Joanne Peters, FOCA Analyst	TV series, 4 episodes
2014	Offspring	Mia Buchdahl	TV series, 2 episodes
2016	The Doctor Blake Mysteries	Beryl Routledge	TV series, 1 episode
2014-17	House Husbands	Real Estate Agent / Elissa	TV series, 2 episodes
2018	Playing for Keeps	Lenita	TV series, 1 episode
2019-	Sonia & Cherry	Sonia	Web series

== Awards ==
- Australian Film Institute Young Actor Award 1996, for Mirror, Mirror
