= Hiruma =

Hiruma is a Japanese surname. Notable people with the surname include:

- Toshi Hiruma, American film producer

== Fictional characters ==
- Yoichi Hiruma, a character in the manga series Eyeshield 21
- Hiruma Brothers, a pair of characters in the manga series Rurouni Kenshin
