= Rowan Schlosberg =

British actor

- Born: Rowan Schlosberg
- Occupation: Actor
- Years active: 1995-present

Rowan Schlosberg is a British actor, best known for his television work in the UK, USA and Australia.

== Career ==
Schlosberg graduated from Australia's National Institute of Dramatic Art (NIDA) with a degree in Performing Arts (Acting). After beginning his career in Australia he went on to perform in television productions in both the UK, Australia and North America, including Smallpox, E=MC2, headLand, East West 101 and Obsession: Dark Desires. He was also cast in the stage productions of Tim Firth's premier Absolutely Frank at the Queen's Theatre in Hornchurch and the West End production of Miracle. In 2014, he took on the role of Theo in the Canadian/UK television production of Olympus, as well as joining the cast in Bravo's sitcom Girlfriends' Guide to Divorce. By the start of 2015 he was cast in a guest role on Supernatural for the CW Network and in 2016 joined the cast of "The Arrangement" for E! Entertainment in a recurring role as Nate Dancourt. In 2017, he shot 4 episodes as Connor for the Netflix series of Lost in Space, as well as 2 episodes in Ghost Wars for the Syfy network as Dr. Nate Fisher. In October 2017 he was cast as Vivek for 2 episodes of ABC's new drama The Crossing. He went on to play William Shakespeare in DC Legends of Tomorrow before reprising his role of Connor in Lost in Space and joining the cast of NBC's Debris.

== Filmography ==
=== Film ===
Year	Title	Role	Notes
1995	Boston Kickout	Young Ted	
2005	Stealth	EDI Technician	
2010	Godkiller	Wes	

=== Television ===
Year	Title	Role	Notes
2005	Nova	Besso	Episode: "E=mc²: Einstein's Big Idea"
2010	headLand	Gareth Williams	Recurring role, 9 episodes
2011	East West 101	David Solderman	Episode: "Jerusalem"
2013	Obsession: Dark Desires	Jim Martin	Episode: "Silent Scream"
2014	Olympus	Theo	Episode: "The Temple of Gaia"
2014	Girlfriends' Guide to Divorce	Publishing House Assistant	Recurring role, 2 episodes
2015	Supernatural	Nebbishy Demon	Episode: "Inside Man"
2017	The Arrangement	Nate Dancourt	Recurring role, 4 episodes
2017	Ghost Wars	Dr Nate Fisher	Recurring role, 2 episodes
2018	The Crossing	Vivek	Recurring role, 2 episodes
2018	Lost in Space	Connor	Recurring role, 4 episodes
2018	The Crossing	Vivek	Recurring role, 2 episodes
2020	Legends of Tomorrow	William Shakespeare	Episode: "Romeo v Juliet: Dawn of Justness"
2021	Debris	Holloway	Recurring role, 2 episodes
