= Jody Kennedy =

Australian actress

Jody Kennedy (born 8 July 1981) is an Australian actress. Along with an extensive list of theatre credits, including with the Bell Shakespeare Company, she appeared in the television drama headLand, as smart university student Maddie McKinnon. She has also appeared in the short-lived Australian hidden camera show Monster House, Matthew Newton's feature film Three Blind Mice and the web series BedHead.
