= Monster House (Australian TV series) =

- Genre: Reality/Comedy
- Presented by: Bernard Curry
- Starring: Rebel Wilson; Celia Ireland; Travis Cotton; Jody Kennedy; Julie Herbert; Glenn Butcher
- Country of origin: Australia
- Original language: English
- No. of seasons: 1
- No. of episodes: 10

Production
- Production location: TCN-9 studios Sydney, Australia

Original release
- Network: Nine Network
- Release: 12 February – 19 February 2008

Monster House was an Australian reality/comedy television series broadcast on the Nine Network. Debuting on 12 February 2008, the program was hosted by Bernard Curry, brother of Stephen and Andrew Curry.

The show centred on the Webb family, played by actors Rebel Wilson, Celia Ireland, Travis Cotton, Jody Kennedy, Julie Herbert and Glenn Butcher, who act as a fictional family in a house purpose-built with hidden cameras to capture their performances and those of the unsuspecting guests who get brought into the family's "web".

The show debuted with an unimpressive 793,000 viewers tuning in. It was pulled from schedules after its second episode, and axed by the network the following day. Nine had commissioned ten unaired episodes of the show, which were filmed in December 2007 and January 2008.

Nine stated it would air the remaining episodes later in the year, and did so as counter-programming during the 2008 Summer Olympics.

== See also ==
- List of programs broadcast by Nine Network
- List of Australian television series
