= HeadLand =

Australian television series

headLand
- Created by: Bevan Lee
- Country of origin: Australia
- Original language: English
- No. of seasons: 2
- No. of episodes: 58

Production
- Running time: c. 42 minutes per episode (plus commercials)

Original release
- Network: Seven Network
- Release: 15 November 2005 – 21 January 2006

Related
- Home and Away

headLand is an Australian drama television series produced by the Seven Network which ran from 15 November 2005 to 21 January 2006. The Seven Network filmed 52 episodes in the first series. Production on the second series had begun before any episodes were aired.

Set at a university, headLand premiered in Australia on Tuesday, 15 November 2005 at 7:30 pm. On 23 January 2006, the Seven Network officially announced that the series has been cancelled. The show aired on weekdays at 7:30 pm in the United Kingdom on E4, re-formatted as half-hour episodes. E4 eventually dropped the show, but episodes continued to be broadcast on Channel 4 at 12:30 pm, this time in the original hour-long format.

== Storylines ==
The show's biggest storyline during its short run was the mystery of the crash which killed four people and put its driver Craig Palmer in a coma. The car crash gave Craig amnesia, but then he remembered Angela McKinnon, his girlfriend and one of the people who died in the crash, was doing drugs at the party and some of her drugs were accidentally consumed by John, Craig's best friend and another person who died in the crash. He also remembered as John had overdosed Angela was screaming at someone in a car, and after the crash their phones were stolen by someone Craig would meet later during the investigation, Detective Sam Wiley. Sam claimed he was doing detective work at the party. Craig was found guilty but after a testament by Sam, Craig was given a two-year jail sentence, but the judge reduced it to 100 hours of community sentence.

Another storyline was Adam Wilde's relationship with his estranged father, Ben Wilde. His father had spent 15 years in prison for murdering his mother after she said Adam wasn't his. There was even belief that bartender Mick McKinnon, who had an affair with Adam's mother before he was born, was Adam's biological father. After a DNA test, it showed Ben was Adam's biological father.

== Cast ==
=== Main ===
- Sam Atwell as Craig Palmer
- Conrad Coleby as Adam Wilde
- Brooke Harman as Kate Monk
- Sophie Katinis as Mel Bennett
- Jody Kennedy as Maddie McKinnon
- Adrienne Pickering as Elly Tate
- Steve Rodgers as Mick McKinnon
- Josh Quong Tart as Will Monk
- Reshad Strik as Andy Llewellyn
- Libby Tanner as Grace Palmer
- Rachael Taylor as Sasha Forbes
- Matthew Walker as Heath Forbes
- Yvonne Strahovski as Freya Lewis
- Rowan Schlosberg as Gareth Williams
- Denise Roberts as Jessica Andrews

=== Recurring ===
- Gyton Grantley as Dane Pickerstaff (11 episodes)
- Penny McNamee as Charlie Cooper (8 episodes)
- Rohan Nichol as Det. Luke Palermo
- John Brumpton as Ben Wilde
- Peta Sergeant as Rachael (10 episodes)

=== Guests ===
- Amanda Muggleton as Geraldine Pye (2 episodes)
- Barry Otto as Professor Day (2 episodes)
- Carole Skinner as Supervisor (3 episodes)
- Craig Horner (2 episodes)
- Dustin Clare as Gareth Williams (2 episodes)
- Grant Piro as Dr Baker (1 episode)
- Luke Ford as Seth Baxter (5 episodes)
- Murray Bartlett as James Brogan (5 episodes)
- Penne Hackforth-Jones as Judge Hildegarde Rosedale (2 episodes)
- Roy Billing as Col (4 episodes)
- Russell Kiefel as Lionel Travers (2 episodes)
- Sarah Chadwick as Diane Forbes (5 episodes)
- Vanessa Downing as Pamela Martin (3 episodes)

== Development and production ==
In 2002, Seven Network's script executive Bevan Lee was asked to create a Home and Away spin-off with the hope of attracting the UK broadcaster Five as a co-producer. He created a show called Away From Home that told the story of Home and Away characters at the Yabbie Creek University. Five were not interested for various reasons, and a big reworking of the original concept was undertaken, and the show was renamed Campus, and later Ten Degrees South – a title eventually rejected due to a possible confusion with UK series 55 Degrees North.

In early 2005, the show's title was finalised as headLand and filming began, with the series earmarked for a July premiere. However, with the pilot reportedly failing initial audience test screenings, some major changes were made, and the pilot was reshot. This and other minor production delays pushed the airdate to much later that year.

== Filming locations ==
The show's exterior scenes were filmed on location in Austinmer, New South Wales. A disused psychiatric hospital at the Sydney College of Arts, Rozelle and the University of Wollongong, doubled as the fictional South Coast University. Studio scenes are filmed at White Bay Studios in Sydney, making it the first Seven Network Sydney drama not to be filmed at the ATN-7 studios in Epping.

== Australian broadcast ==
headLand was originally scheduled to screen at 7:30 pm on Tuesday and Thursday nights throughout the summer, continuing into 2006. However, after a strong debut, the show quickly suffered a large slump in the ratings. With Home and Away on summer hiatus, the show was shifted to the earlier 7 pm slot and broadcast on Monday, Tuesday, Wednesday and Thursday in hope of building up more interest in the show during the non-ratings period. However, ratings failed to pick up and the show even suffered its lowest viewership during the period.

Because of this, on 1 December 2005, Seven announced to industry insiders that headLand would be removed from the schedule after Thursday, 22 December 2005. A day later they reversed their decision, but a little over a week later rumours started surfacing that headLand would be removed from prime time as early as Monday, 12 December 2005. This was confirmed to be just a rumour, as Seven announced headLand would remain in its current timeslot until 12 January 2006. Beginning 16 January 2006, headLand was removed from its Monday-Thursday 7:00 pm slot due to the return of Home and Away and the airing of the Australian Open tennis tournament. Further episodes of headLand were aired in a Saturday timeslot until the start of the 2006 ratings season.

The remaining episodes that had not been broadcast on the Seven Network were eventually aired on its digital channel 7two at 11 am weekdays. The series ended with Grace and Luc getting engaged, but many other storylines were left up in the air at the end.

== Home media ==
In March 2020, the complete series was made available on 7plus.

Season	Format	Episodes #	Release date	Expiry date	Special features	Distributor
Season 1	Streaming	Episodes 52	20 March 2020	20 March 2021	None	7plus
Season 2	Streaming	Episodes 06	20 March 2020	20 March 2021	None	7plus

== Reception ==
A Herald Sun reporter stated headLand was "destined to go down as one of the worst soaps this country has produced."
