= The Pact (2003 film) =

- Directed by: Strathford Hamilton
- Produced by: Phillip Avalon
- Starring: Sigrid Thornton; Robert Mammone
- Release date: 2003
- Country: Australia
- Language: English
- Box office: A$982,317 (Australia)

The Pact is a 2003 Australian film.

The movie was privately financed.

== Plot ==
Teenage friends Susan, Wilga, Patricia and Kenny are train surfers, seeking an adrenaline high. One day they run out of luck when Patricia is impaled on a water pipe. Following her death, the others make a pact to do something good to honour her name - or come back and ride the train again in 15 years to their death. 15 years later Susan and Kenny have forgotten about the pact, but Wilga, having spent his time in prisons and mental wards over the years has come to collect on the pact. Wilga murders Susan's boyfriend and kidnaps her daughter to blackmail her into riding with him to the end of the line.

== Cast ==
- Sigrid Thornton as Susan Tuttle
- Robert Mammone as Wilga Roberts
- Peter O'Brien as Roy Folksdale
- Essie Davis as Helene Davis
- Saskia Burmeister as Young Susan Tuttle
- Jamie Croft as Young Wilga Roberts
- Ellie Saffron as Patricia Roberts
- Bernard Wheatley as Kenny Da Silva
- Mitchell McMahon as Young Kenny Da Silva
- Basia A'Hern as Brittany Vickson
- Christopher Pate as Andrew Ogilvie
- Warwick Young as Detective Broadhurst
- Jason Chong as Detective Moeller
- Grant Dodwell as Officer Clem
- Gandhi MacIntyre as Motel Manager
- Toby Truslove as Attendant
