= Blurred (film) =

2002 film

- DVD cover
- Directed by: Evan Clarry
- Written by: Stephen Davis, Kier Shorey (screenplay)
- Starring: Matthew Newton; Craig Horner; Kristian Schmid; Veronica Sywak; Mark Priestley; Travis Cotton; Petra Yared; Charlotte Rees; Nathalie Roy; Jessica Gower; Tony Brockman; Jamie Croft; Gyton Grantley; Damien Garvey
- Release date: 2002
- Country: Australia
- Language: English
- Box office: $1,454,428 (Australia)

Blurred is a 2002 Australian film about groups of school leavers travelling for schoolies week on the Gold Coast. It was directed by Evan Clarry and written by Stephen Davis and Kier Shorey.

== Cast ==
- Matthew Newton as Mason the Chauffeur
- Craig Horner as Pete the Bus Nerd
- Kristian Schmid as Danny the Bus Nerd
- Veronica Sywak as Lynette the Bus Nerdette
- Mark Priestley as Calvin Jutsom the Holden Boy
- Travis Cotton as Wayne the Holden Boy
- Petra Yared as Yolanda the Limo Girl
- Charlotte Rees as Amanda the Limo Girl
- Nathalie Roy as Freda the Apartment Girl
- Jessica Gower as Jillian the Train Girl
- Tony Brockman as Bradley the Train Boy
- Jamie Croft as Zack the Innocent
- Gyton Grantley as Gavin
- Damien Garvey as Pigman

== Awards ==
- 2003 Australian Film Institute Awards – Best Screenplay, Adapted from another Source (nominated)

== Box office ==
Blurred grossed $1,454,428 at the box office in Australia.

== See also ==
- Cinema of Australia
