= The Jesters (TV series) =

Australian comedy television series

- Genre: Comedy
- Created by: Kevin Brumpton; Angus FitzSimons
- Written by: Kevin Brumpton; Angus FitzSimons
- Directed by: Kimble Rendall
- Starring: Mick Molloy; Emily Taheny; Ben Geurens; Christian Barratt-Hill; Andrew Ryan; Travis Cotton; Susie Porter; Deborah Kennedy
- Theme music composer: Kyls Burtland
- Composers: Rory O'Donoghue; Kyls Burtland
- Country of origin: Australia
- Original language: English
- No. of seasons: 2
- No. of episodes: 16

Production
- Executive producers: Kevin Brumpton; Angus FitzSimons; Ted Robinson (Movie Network)
- Producers: Adam Bowen; Barbara Gibbs
- Cinematography: Hugh Miller
- Editor: Julie-Anne Deruvo
- Running time: 29 minutes
- Production companies: Return Fire Productions; Movie Network

Original release
- Network: Movie Extra
- Release: 8 September 2009 – 12 April 2011

The Jesters is an Australian comedy series produced for Movie Extra subscription television channel. The series is a satire about the day-to-day battles of a sketch comedy veteran turned producer.

== Cast ==
- Mick Molloy as Dave Davies
- Emily Taheny as Kat Bailey
- Ben Geurens as Steve Morris
- Christian Barratt-Hill as Michael Stevens
- Andrew Ryan as Zak Green
- Travis Cotton as Tony Coggan
- Susie Porter as Julia Wilson
- Deborah Kennedy as Di Sunnington
- Dave Gibson as Ernie
- Petra Yared as Mickey
- Helen Thomson as Harriet
- Danny Adcock as Bob

== Overview ==
The Jesters is a slick and darkly comic look behind-the-scenes of a TV comedy show.

== Episodes ==
=== Season 1 ===
#	Title	Airdate	Timeslot
1	"Hard Time Getting Soft Time"	8 September 2009	Tuesday 9:30 pm–10:00 pm
2	"The Female Voice"	15 September 2009	Tuesday 9:30 pm–10:00 pm
3	"Breakfast Clubbed"	22 September 2009	Tuesday 9:30 pm–10:00 pm
4	"Going Corporate"	29 September 2009	Tuesday 9:30 pm–10:00 pm
5	"All Nighter"	6 October 2009	Tuesday 9:30 pm–10:00 pm
6	"Real Talent"	13 October 2009	Tuesday 9:30 pm–10:00 pm
7	"And The Loser Is..."	20 October 2009	Tuesday 9:30 pm–10:00 pm
8	"Wrap Up"	27 October 2009	Tuesday 9:30 pm–10:00 pm

=== Season 2 ===
#	Title	Airdate	Timeslot
1	"Don't Look Back"	22 February 2011	Tuesday 8:30 pm–9:00 pm
2	"The Fallout"	1 March 2011	Tuesday 8:30 pm–9:00 pm
3	"A Bit on the Side"	8 March 2011	Tuesday 8:30 pm–9:00 pm
4	"The Reunion"	15 March 2011	Tuesday 8:30 pm–9:00 pm
5	"Staged"	22 March 2011	Tuesday 8:30 pm–9:00 pm
6	"Weekend at Davies"	29 March 2011	Tuesday 8:30 pm–9:00 pm
7	"Stunted"	5 April 2011	Tuesday 8:30 pm–9:00 pm
8	"Go For Gold"	12 April 2011	Tuesday 8:30 pm–9:00 pm

== See also ==
- List of Australian television series
