= Disappearance (2002 film) =

2002 American television film by Walter Klenhard

- Promotional release poster
- Genre: Mystery; Thriller
- Written by: Walter Klenhard
- Directed by: Walter Klenhard
- Starring: Harry Hamlin; Susan Dey; Jeremy Lelliott; Basia A'Hern; Jamie Croft
- Music by: Shirley Walker
- Country of origin: United States
- Original language: English

Production
- Executive producer: Laurie Goldstein
- Producer: Michael O. Gallant
- Cinematography: David Connell
- Editor: Scott Smith
- Running time: 92 minutes
- Production companies: Nightstar Productions; Robert Greenwald Productions

Original release
- Network: TBS
- Release: April 21, 2002

Disappearance is a 2002 American mystery thriller television film written and directed by Walter Klenhard and starring Harry Hamlin, Susan Dey, Jeremy Lelliott, Basia A'Hern, and Jamie Croft. In the film, a family on a road trip through the Nevada desert stumbles upon a mysterious ghost town.

Disappearance was filmed in Adelaide, Australia. It aired on TBS on April 21, 2002.

== Plot ==
While driving through Nevada, the Henley family – Jim, his wife Patty, their daughter Kate, and son Matt, along with Matt's friend Ethan – discover the existence of Weaver, a ghost town, and decide to take a detour to it to take pictures. Stopping at a diner in the neighboring town of Two Wells, the family asks about Weaver but the patrons, all seeming dazed, claim not to have heard of the town, although a gas station attendant warns Jim to "stay on the pavement". The Henleys make their way to Weaver, where they find a wall with a mysterious symbol and a human-sized dried skin. They discover a videotape which shows previous visitors being taken by an unseen force, and then ending with a girl running from the unknown threat. Unnerved, the family tries to leave but the SUV won't start and they spend the night in one of the abandoned buildings.

The next morning, the family discover their SUV missing, along with a flashlight and Jim's sweater. Deciding to split up, Kate, Patty, and Matt remain in the building while Jim and Ethan set out for the diner. The two discover a large expanse of glass in the middle of the desert, a plaque in the center revealing it to be a 1948 neutron bomb test site called "Ground Zero". Ethan walks just ahead of Jim over a ridge, and when Jim makes his way over the ridge, Ethan is nowhere to be seen. Jim glimpses a car graveyard in the distance. He rushes there, hoping to find Ethan but instead discovers his SUV parked with other cars in the same pattern as the symbol on the wall.

Back in Weaver, Patty, away from the others to use the bathroom, senses something watching her, then falls through rotten boards into a mine shaft. She hears growling sounds from below, and climbs up, discovering many discarded items including her husband's sweater. Matt and Kate are searching for their mother and Matt climbs down the mine to help her. The source of the growling rushes in the dark toward Patty and Matt. Patty fires a gun toward the sound which stops, although no body is discovered.

In the vehicle graveyard, as Jim salvages a battery for his SUV from another vehicle, he feels stalked by one or more unseen creatures. He manages to evade them and successfully puts a replacement battery in and drives back to Weaver. He rescues his family, only for a seemingly driverless school bus and truck to block their way, so Jim drives them both into a clapboard outbuilding to escape. They stop to use a telephone at the diner, but it is useless. Jim and Matt spot a dust cloud moving in their direction from the vicinity of Weaver.

Jim visits Sheriff Richards in Two Wells, telling him about Ethan's disappearance, the town of Weaver where the townspeople vanished without a trace, and the unseen beings attacking them. Richards denies all knowledge of the town, but while he is away, Jim is pulled aside by an old inmate named Lester who says the town does exist and the unseen force is possibly the mutated, deformed offspring of the townspeople who refused evacuation before the bomb was dropped or the spirits of Indians interred in a burial ground under the town, or even Area 51, although he doesn't believe aliens are necessarily the explanation for the unseen forces in Weaver. Jim is not certain if any of this is true or simply the ramblings of a madman.

Kate finds the girl from the video alive and working at a local restaurant. When Kate returns with the rest of the family, the girl is nowhere to be seen and she is told that she's "gone off-shift". Sheriff Richards agrees to search for Ethan the next day. The family stays in a motel, but when Kate senses one of the creatures watching them from the window, the family decides to leave at once. Meanwhile, the Sheriff takes the inmate Lester to the desert, lights a fire, and leaves him for "the beings".

As the Henleys attempt to flee, they are stopped by the Sheriff, who tells them that he found Ethan. The four of them pick up Ethan from the jail, Jim noticing Lester's empty cell. As the five of them drive off, Ethan tells them he fell and does not remember anything else, while Matt questions the events. As Jim is distracted, the car hits an unseen creature, causing the SUV to flip over. The viewpoint of one of the unseen creatures makes its way to the wrecked car, and the Henleys are heard screaming.

Six months later, Jim is now the gas station attendant, while Patty works as a waitress in the diner, all of them in the same dazed state as the other members of the town of Two Wells. After Patty has served Sheriff Richards at the diner, Kate feeds one of the crows as several bikers turn up at the diner.

== Cast ==
- Harry Hamlin as Jim Henley
- Susan Dey as Patty Henley
- Jeremy Lelliott as Matt Henley
- Basia A'Hern as Kate Henley
- Jamie Croft as Ethan
- Jeremy Kewley as Sheriff Richards
- Roger Newcombe as Lester
- Victoria Dixon-Whittle as Lisa
- Annie Carter as Tammy
- Ian Boyce as Old Man
- Robert MacPherson as Assistant Deputy
- Nikki Fort as Ice Cream Waitress
- Christopher James Taylor as Steve
- Charlotte Rees as Rachel
- Paul Reichstein as Brian
- Dominic Pedlar as Bill the Cook
- Claude Revi as Biker #1
- Clive Cunningham as Biker #2

== Production ==
Disappearance reunites actors Harry Hamlin and Susan Dey, who co-starred in the TV series L.A. Law. Filming began in February 2001 in Adelaide, Australia.

== Release ==
Disappearance aired in the United States on TBS on April 21, 2002. It was released on DVD on January 21, 2003.
