= Travis Cotton =

Australian actor and playwright

- Born: May 18, 1975 (age 51)
- Occupations: Actor & Playwright

Travis Cotton (born 18 May 1975) is an Australian actor and playwright. He studied acting at the Western Australian Academy of Performing Arts.

== Film and television credits ==
=== Film ===
- My Year Without Sex (2009) - Howard
- Blurred (2002) - Wayne

=== Television ===
- The Jesters (2009–10) (TV) - Tony Coggan
- Rush (2008) (TV) - Jeremy
- Monster House (2008) (TV) - Jack Webb
- Satisfaction (2008) (TV) - Bobby Brooks
- Kick (2007) (TV) - John
- Bastard Boys (2007) (TV) - The Feral
- In A Pickle (2005) - Johnny
- Right Here, Right Now (2004) - Simon
- Blue Heelers (2003) (TV) - Bart Purdy
- Always Greener (2003) (TV) - Darren Nieuwenhutzen
- Neighbours (2022) (TV) - Dean Covey

== Awards ==
- 2005 Naked Theatre Company Award Best Writer of a Short Play, God, the Devil and the True History of Mankind
- 2003 Naked Theatre Company Award Best Writer of a Short Play, The 5th at Randwick
- 2001 Equity Guild Awards Best Newcomer, Away
