= List of animated feature films of 1995 =

This is a list of animated feature films first released in 1995.

== List ==
Title	Country	Director	Production company	Animation technique	Format	Notes	Release date	Duration
The Adventures of Mole	United Kingdom	Martin Gates	Martin Gates Productions; BMG Entertainment	Traditional	Television film		December 24, 1995	52 minutes
Alice in Wonderland	United States; Japan	Toshiyuki Hiruma; Takashi	Jetlag Productions	Traditional	Direct-to-video		March 12, 1995	45 minutes
Balto	United States; United Kingdom	Simon Wells	Amblin Entertainment; Amblimation	Traditional	Theatrical	Fictionalisation of the true story of Balto and the 1925 serum run to Nome, and the third and final production from Amblimation, the animation studio founded by Steven Spielberg.	December 22, 1995	77 minutes
Black Beauty	United States; Japan	Toshiyuki Hiruma; Takashi	Jetlag Productions	Traditional	Direct-to-video		May 9, 1995	49 minutes
Capitán Cardozo	Argentina	Pablo Rodríguez Jáuregui; Gabriel Yuvone		Traditional / Stop motion / Computer / Live action	Live-action animated film	Nominated at the Tercer Premio Coral for Animation at the 17th Festival Internacional del Nuevo Cine Latinoamericano.		90 minutes
Casper	United States	Brad Silberling	Amblin Entertainment; The Harvey Entertainment Company	Computer / Live action	Theatrical		May 26, 1995	101 minutes
Catnapped! とつぜん！猫の国 バニパルウィット (Totsuzen! Neko no Kuni Baniparu Uitto)	Japan	Takashi Nakamura	Triangle Staff	Traditional	Theatrical		June 10, 1995	77 minutes
The Christmas Elves	United States	Chris Bartleman; Diane Eskenazi (uncredited)	Golden Films	Traditional	Direct-to-video		August 29, 1995	48 minutes
Cinderella: Conspiracy at the Emerald Castle; Cenerentola e il Castello di Esmeraldo	Italy	Orlando Corradi	Tatsunoko Production; Mondo TV	Traditional	Compilation film	Third compilation film of the animated television series Cinderella (Shinderera Monogatari) that later ran from April 4 until October 3, 1996, for a total of 26 episodes.		78 minutes
Crayon Shin-chan: Unkokusai's Ambition クレヨンしんちゃん 雲黒斎の野望 (Kureyon Shinchan: Unkokusai no Yabō)	Japan	Mitsuru Hongo	Shin-Ei Animation; TV Asahi; ADK	Traditional	Theatrical		April 15, 1995	94 minutes
Curly, the Littlest Puppy	United States; Japan	Toshiyuki Hiruma; Takashi	Jetlag Productions	Traditional	Direct-to-video		August 9, 1995	47 minutes
Days of Rage: A Requiem for Europe; Μέρες οργής, ένα requiem για την Ευρώπη (Meres orgis, ena requiem gia tin Evropi)	Greece	Vassilis Mazomenos	Horme pictures	Traditional		First Greek animated film.	November 1995	73 minutes
The Diary of Anne Frank アンネの日記 (Anne no Nikki)	Japan	Akinori Nagaoka	Madhouse	Traditional	Theatrical		August 19, 1995	102 minutes
Dol-a-on yeong-ung Hong Gil-dong 돌아온 영웅 홍길동 (The Return of the Hero – Hong Gil-dong)	South Korea	Shin Dong-heon	Dol Flower Company	Traditional	Theatrical		December 24, 1995	75 minutes
Doraemon: Nobita's Diary of the Creation of the World ドラえもん のび太の創世日記 (Doraemon: Nobita no Sousei nikki)	Japan	Tsutomu Shibayama	Shin-Ei Animation	Traditional	Theatrical		March 4, 1995	97 minutes
Dragon Ball Z: Fusion Reborn ドラゴンボールZ 復活のフュージョン!!悟空とベジータ (Dragon Ball Z Fukkatsu no Fusion!! Gokū to Bejīta)	Japan	Shigeyasu Yamauchi	Toei Animation	Traditional	Theatrical		March 4, 1995	51 minutes
Dragon Ball Z: Wrath of the Dragon ドラゴンボールZ 龍拳爆発!!悟空がやらねば誰がやる？ (Dragon Ball Z Ryū-Ken Bakuhatsu!! Gokū ga Yaraneba Dare ga Yaru?)	Japan	Mitsuo Hashimoto	Toei Animation	Traditional	Theatrical		July 15, 1995	52 minutes
Dragon Knight: Another Knight on the Town ドラゴンナイト外伝 (Doragon Naito Gaiden)	Japan	Kaoru Toyooka	All Products; Triple X	Traditional	Direct-to-video; OVA		February 25, 1995	47 minutes
Drawn from Memory	United States	Paul Fierlinger		Traditional	Television film		October 30, 1995	56 minutes
Elementalors 精霊使い (Seirei Tsukai)	Japan	Katsuhito Akiyama	AIC; Kadokawa Shoten; Sony Music Entertainment; Tsuburaya Productions	Traditional	Direct-to-video; OVA		April 1, 1995	48 minutes
The Elixir; Эликсир (Eliksir)	Russia			Traditional				44 minutes
Gargoyles the Movie: The Heroes Awaken	United States	Saburo Hashimoto; Takamitsu Kawamura; Kazuo Terada	Walt Disney Television Animation	Traditional	Direct-to-video	Reedited alternate version of the five-part storyline "Awakening", the pilot of the television series Gargoyles that aired from October 24, 1994 to February 15, 1997 for a total of 78 half-hour episodes.	January 31, 1995	92 minutes
Ghost in the Shell; Ghost in the Shell/攻殻機動隊 (Gōsuto in za Sheru/Kōkaku Kidōtai)	Japan; United Kingdom	Mamoru Oshii	Palm Pictures; Production I.G; Bandai Visual; Manga Entertainment	Traditional	Theatrical		November 18, 1995	82 minutes
A Goofy Movie	United States	Kevin Lima	Walt Disney Television Animation; Disneytoon Studios	Traditional	Theatrical		April 7, 1995	78 minutes
Gumby: The Movie	United States	Art Clokey	Clokey Films; Premavision Productions	Stop motion	Theatrical		October 4, 1995	90 minutes
Heidi	United States; Japan	Toshiyuki Hiruma; Takashi	Jetlag Productions	Traditional	Direct-to-video		1995	47 minutes
Hercules	United States; Japan	Toshiyuki Hiruma; Takashi	Jetlag Productions	Traditional	Direct-to-video		February 6, 1995	50 minutes
The Hungry Best 5 헝그리 베스트5 (Heonggeuri Beseuteu 5)	South Korea	Lee Gyu-hyeong	Young Production Co., Ltd.	Traditional	Theatrical		December 23, 1995	90 minutes
In the Country of Alhoks	Ukraine	Evgeniy Bugaev	Odesa Animation Studio	Traditional	Theatrical		1995	135 minutes
Jonny Quest vs. The Cyber Insects	United States	Mario Piluso	Hanna-Barbera Cartoons; Fil-Cartoons	Traditional	Television film		November 19, 1995	90 minutes
Jungle Book	United States; Japan	Toshiyuki Hiruma; Takashi	Jetlag Productions	Traditional	Direct-to-video		October 17, 1995	48 minutes
Junkers Come Here ユンカース・カム・ヒア (Yunkāsu Kamu Hia)	Japan	Junichi Sato	Bandai Visual; Triangle Staff	Traditional	Theatrical		July 20, 1995	100 minutes
The Katta-kun Story カッタ君物語 (Katta-kun Monogatari)	Japan	Kenji Yoshida	"Katta-kun Monogatari" Production Committee; Ube City; Tokyo Kids; Nabe Studio; Aubeck	Traditional	Theatrical		July 12, 1995	75 minutes
Kazu & Yasu Hero Tanjō; KAZU&YASU ヒーロー誕生 (Kazu & Yasu: Birth of a Hero)	Japan	Kazuki Akane	Triangle Staff	Traditional	Theatrical		July 22, 1995	86 minutes
The Kingdom of Green Glade; Krolestwo Zielonej Polany	Poland	Krzysztof Kiwerski	Studio Filmów Animowanych w Krakowie; Telewizja Polska; Filmar	Traditional			January 20, 1995	64 minutes
Koushi-den 孔子傳 (The Biography of Confucius)	Japan; South Korea; Taiwan	Osamu Dezaki		Traditional	Television film			90 minutes
The Land Before Time III: The Time of the Great Giving	United States	Roy Allen Smith	Universal Cartoon Studios	Traditional	Direct-to-video	Third installment in The Land Before Time film series.	December 15, 1995	70 minutes
Legend of Crystania: The Motion Picture はじまりの冒険者たち レジェンド・オブ・クリスタニア (Hajimari no Bōkenshatachi: Rejendo obu Kurisutania)	Japan	Ryūtarō Nakamura	Triangle Staff	Traditional	Theatrical		July 29, 1995	80 minutes
The Legend of the Blue Wolves 銀河帝国の滅亡・外伝 蒼き狼たちの伝説 (Ginga Teikoku no Metsubō Gaiden: Aoki Ōkami-tachi no Densetsu)	Japan	Yasunori Urata	Phoenix Entertainment; Yako Corporation; Happinet Pictures	Traditional	Direct-to-video; OVA		December 18, 1995	45 minutes
Lesson of Darkness 淫獣家庭教師 (The Dirty Beastly Tutor)	Japan	Tsutomu Ono; Tsutomu Yabuki	Pink Pineapple	Traditional	Direct-to-video; OVA		November 29, 1995	45 minutes
Lesson XX	Japan	Rin Hiroo	Sido Limited	Traditional	Direct-to-video; OVA		April 7, 1995	49 minutes
The Life of Buddha	Singapore		Animata Productions; Buddhist Library	Traditional		First feature-length animated film produced in Singapore		75 minutes
Little Red Riding Hood	United States; Japan	Toshiyuki Hiruma; Takashi	Jetlag Productions	Traditional	Direct-to-video		July 31, 1995	49 minutes
Ludwig & Richard	France; Germany	Dieter Olaf Klama	Kristian Kühn Film; Les Films de l'Atalante	Cutout	Theatrical			53 minutes
Lupin III: Farewell to Nostradamus ルパン三世 くたばれ!ノストラダムス (Rupan Sansei: Kutabare! Nosutoradamusu)	Japan	Shunya Itō; Takeshi Shirato	Tokyo Movie Shinsha; Telecom Animation Film	Traditional	Theatrical		April 22, 1995	100 minutes
Lupin III: The Pursuit of Harimao's Treasure ルパン三世 ハリマオの財宝を追え!! (Rupan Sansei: Harimao no Zaihō o oe!!)	Japan	Osamu Dezaki	Tokyo Movie Shinsha	Traditional	Television special		August 4, 1995	90 minutes
Macross Plus: Movie Edition マクロスプラス (Makurosu Purasu)	Japan	Shōji Kawamori; Shinichirō Watanabe	Triangle Staff	Traditional	Theatrical	First anime feature directed by Shinichirō Watanabe.	August 27, 1995	115 minutes
Magic Gift of the Snowman	United States; Japan	Toshiyuki Hiruma; Takashi	Jetlag Productions	Traditional	Direct-to-video		November 9, 1995	47 minutes
Memories メモリーズ (Memorîzu)	Japan	Kōji Morimoto; Tensai Okamura; Katsuhiro Otomo	Madhouse; Studio 4°C	Traditional	Theatrical		December 23, 1995	113 minutes
The Mirror of Wonders; Lo specchio delle meraviglie	Italy	Stelio Passacantando	Studio Passacantando	Stop motion				73 minutes
The Monkeys and the Secret Weapon; Aberne og det hemmelige våben	Denmark	Jannik Hastrup	Dansk Tegnefilm Kompagni; Per Holst Filmproduktion	Traditional	Theatrical		February 3, 1995	71 minutes
The New Adventures of Mother Goose	United States	Chris Delaney	Martindale-Hiller Entertainment	Traditional/Live action	Television special Live-action animated film		April 15, 1995	60 minutes
The New Adventures of Peter Rabbit	United States	Diane Eskenazi (uncredited)	Golden Films	Traditional	Direct-to-video		March 7, 1995	48 minutes
Noah's Ark	United States	Hazel Morgan; Diane Eskenazi (uncredited)	Golden Films	Traditional	Direct-to-video		August 29, 1995	48 minutes
The Nutcracker	United States; Japan	Toshiyuki Hiruma; Takashi	Jetlag Productions	Traditional	Direct-to-video		July 31, 1995	47 minutes
Pearl Island; İnci Adası	Turkey	Derviş Pasin	Ella Cartoon Studio	Traditional	Television film			62 minutes
The Pebble and the Penguin	United States	Don Bluth; Gary Goldman	Don Bluth Ireland Limited	Traditional	Theatrical	Final Don Bluth film to use animation cels, and the final production overall from Don Bluth Entertainment.	April 12, 1995	74 minutes
People: A Musical Celebration	United States	Aleksey Alekseev; Vladlen Barbe; Joshua M. Greene; Svetlana Grossou; Oleg Kuzovkov; Dmitriy Naumov; Igor Veichtaguin; Valeriy Zhirnov	Disney Channel (in association with); Klassika Studio (animation production); Shanghai Animation Film Studio; Shanghai Morning Sun Animation (animation production); Shanghai Yi Li Mei Animation Co. (animation production)	Traditional / Stop motion	Television special	Based on the 1980 book People by Peter Spier.	November 28, 1995	54 minutes
Peter and the Wolf	United States	George Daugherty; Jean Flynn	IF/X Productions; Cosgrove Hall Productions	Traditional / Live action	Television special Live-action animated film		December 8, 1995	48 minutes
Pocahontas	United States	Mike Gabriel; Eric Goldberg	Walt Disney Feature Animation	Traditional	Theatrical		June 23, 1995	81 minutes
Pocahontas	United States	Diane Eskenazi (uncredited)	Golden Films	Traditional	Direct-to-video		April 11, 1995	48 minutes
Pocahontas	Germany	Roswitha Haas	Dingo Pictures	Limited	Direct-to-video			53 minutes
Pocahontas	Australia		Burbank Animation Studios	Traditional	Direct-to-video		October 16, 1995	50 minutes
The Prince and the Pauper	United States	Hazel Morgan; Diane Eskenazi (uncredited)	Golden Films	Traditional	Direct-to-video		May 2, 1995	48 minutes
The Real Shlemiel; Die Schelme von Schelm	France; Germany; Hungary	Albert Hanan Kaminski	Les Films de l'Arlequin; TMO Loonland; Project Images Films; Videovox Stúdió	Traditional			October 12, 1995	77 minutes, 79 minutes, 80 minutes
The Red Hawk 붉은 매 (Bulg-eunmae)	South Korea	Sim Sang-il; Hwang Jeong-ryeol	Daewon Dongwha	Traditional	Theatrical		August 5, 1995	85 minutes
Run ５等になりたい。 (Gotō ni Naritai.)	Japan	Mei Kato	GoGo Visual Planning; Tama Production; Shanghai Yilimei	Traditional	Theatrical		June 18, 1995	75 minutes
Sailor Moon SuperS: The Movie 美少女戦士セーラームーンSuperS セーラー9戦士集結!ブラック・ドリーム・ホールの奇跡 (Bishōjo Senshi Sērā Mūn Sūpāzu: Sērā Kyū Senshi Shūketsu! Burakku Dorīmu Hōru no Kiseki)	Japan	Hiroki Shibata	Toei Animation	Traditional	Theatrical		December 23, 1995	60 minutes
Saitama Bōsō Saizensen Flag! Shinimonogurui no Seishun!! 埼玉県暴走最前線 フラッグ! 死にものぐるいの青春!!	Japan	Satoshi Dezaki	Magic Bus	Traditional	Direct-to-video; OVA		December 1, 1995	46 minutes
Silent Service 沈黙の艦隊 (Chinmoku no Kantai)	Japan	Ryousuke Takahashi	Bandai Visual; Sunrise	Computer / Traditional	Television special	First released direct-to-video on December 18 this year before being officially broadcast on television on March 3, 1996, a year later.	December 18, 1995	214 minutes
Slayers The Motion Picture スレイヤーズ (Sureiyāzu)	Japan	Kazuo Yamazaki; Hiroshi Watanabe	J.C.Staff	Traditional	Theatrical	First installment in the Slayers film series.	August 5, 1995	62 minutes
Sleeping Beauty	United States; Japan	Toshiyuki Hiruma; Takashi	Jetlag Productions	Traditional	Direct-to-video		March 17, 1995	48 minutes
The Snow Queen	United Kingdom	Martin Gates	Martin Gates Productions	Traditional	Television film		November 21, 1995	78 minutes
Snow White	United States; Japan	Toshiyuki Hiruma; Takashi	Jetlag Productions	Traditional	Direct-to-video		April 27, 1995	46 minutes
Soreike! Anpanman Yūreisen o Yattsukero!! それいけ! アンパンマン ゆうれい船をやっつけろ!! (Let's Go! Anpanman: Let's Defeat the Haunted Ship!!)	Japan	Hiroyuki Yano	Tokyo Movie Shinsha	Traditional	Theatrical		July 29, 1995	86 minutes
The Tale of Tillie's Dragon	United States	Mike Stribling	Stribling Productions	Traditional	Direct-to-video		September 1995	44 minutes
Tank Girl	United States	Rachel Talalay	United Artists	Traditional /Live action	Theatrical		March 31, 1995	104 minutes
Tobe! Pegasus: Kokoro ni Goal ni Shoot 翔べ! ペガサス 心のゴールにシュート (Fly! Pegasus: Shoot at the Goal of the Heart)	Japan	Seiji Okuda	Shinano Kikaku Co., Ltd.	Traditional	Theatrical		June 3, 1995	74 minutes
Toy Story	United States	John Lasseter	Pixar Animation Studios	Computer	Theatrical	First ever computer-animated feature film.	November 22, 1995	81 minutes
Whisper of the Heart 耳をすませば (Mimi o Sumaseba)	Japan	Yoshifumi Kondō	Studio Ghibli	Traditional	Theatrical		July 15, 1995	111 minutes
The Wind in the Willows	United Kingdom	Dave Unwin	TVC	Traditional / Live action	Television film		December 25, 1995	73 minutes
Zukkoke Sanningumi: Kusunoki Yashiki no Guruguru-sama ズッコケ三人組 楠屋敷のグルグル様 (Zukkoke Trio: Guruguru-sama of Kusunoki Mansion)	Japan	Iku Suzuki	Yomiko Advertising; J.C. Staff	Traditional	Television special		November 11, 1995	45 minutes

== Highest-grossing animated films of the year ==
Rank	Title	Studio	Worldwide gross	Ref.
1	Toy Story	Pixar Animation Studios	$401,157,969	
2	Pocahontas	Walt Disney Feature Animation	$346,079,773	
3	A Goofy Movie	Disney MovieToons	$35,348,597	
4	Whisper of the Heart	Studio Ghibli	$22,803,100 (¥1.85 billion)	
5	Doraemon: Nobita's Diary of the Creation of the World	Asatsu	$16,023,800 (¥1.30 billion)	
6	Dragon Ball Z: Fusion Reborn	Toei Animation	$15,654,020 (¥1.27 billion)	
7	Sailor Moon SuperS: The Movie	Toei Animation	$12,942,300 (¥1.05 billion)	
8	Balto	Amblimation	$11,348,324	
9	Crayon Shin-chan: Unkokusai's Ambition	Shin-Ei Animation	$10,344,250	
10	Ghost in the Shell	Production I.G	$10,000,000	
11	The Pebble and the Penguin	Don Bluth Entertainment	$3,983,912	
12	Gumby: The Movie	Premavision Productions	$57,100	

== See also ==
- List of animated television series of 1995
