= The Real Macaw (film) =

- DVD cover
- Directed by: Mario Andreacchio
- Screenplay by: Bruce Hancock; Matthew Perry
- Produced by: Margot McDonald
- Starring: Jamie Croft; Deborra-Lee Furness; Joe Petruzzi; John Waters; Jason Robards
- Cinematography: David Foreman
- Edited by: Edward McQueen-Mason
- Music by: Bill Conti
- Production companies: Adelaide Motion Picture Company; Becker Entertainment; Bellwether Films
- Distributed by: REP Distribution
- Release date: 24 September 1998
- Running time: 91 minutes
- Country: Australia
- Language: English
- Budget: $5 million (estimated)
- Box office: $741,876

The Real Macaw is a 1998 Australian adventure film written by Bruce Hancock and Matthew Perry and directed by Mario Andreacchio. It was produced and distributed by Becker Entertainment in association with the Australian Film Finance Corporation, The South Australian Film Corporation, The New South Wales Film and Television Office and The Queensland Government through Film Queensland, and filmed on location in Brisbane, Queensland. The film was released in Australia on 24 September 1998 and released on VHS in the United States and Canada on 11 July 2000 by Paramount Home Video. It stars Jamie Croft as Sam Girdis, Deborra-Lee Furness as Beth Girdis, Joe Petruzzi as Rick Girdis, John Waters as Dr. Lance Hagen, and Jason Robards as Grandpa Girdis. The voice of Mac the Parrot was performed by Daniel Murphy in the Australian version and by John Goodman in the North American version.

== Plot ==
In the Amazon rainforest, Mac, a young macaw, explores an ancient temple full of treasure. When a group of pirates arrive to steal the treasure, they capture Mac, and return to the ship, where the pirate captain gives Mac a jeweled ring. When Mac escapes, the ship is set on fire and sinks. Mac lands on Coral Island in the South Pacific. The pirate captain escapes there too, along with a treasure chest he salvaged. He buries the treasure and marks the spot with an “X”, as Mac watches on.

A century later, Mac, now 149, can now secretly speak as a human and lives in Australia with an old man, whose grandson, Sam (who has a rough relationship with his father Rick) often visits. One day, Rick reveals that he is in debt and has had to sell Grandpa's house.

Mac shows his ring to Sam, who believes that selling it could save the house. A museum curator, Dr. Hagen offers Sam $3,000 for the ring, but when they realise it won't be enough, Mac tells Sam about the treasure buried on Coral Island. They decide to sell the ring, to pay for flights to the island, but Sam lets it slip to Dr Hagen about the treasure. In reality, Hagen is a thief who steals museum artifacts and sells them for money. Grandpa realises where Sam is going and the family set off to the airport to follow him. Unbeknownst to them, Dr. Hagen is also in pursuit.

At Coral Island, Sam and Mac discover that a resort now exists on the island. The pair try to check in to the hotel, but the desk clerk kicks them out upon seeing Mac. That night, Sam and Mac search for the treasure and see Dr. Hagen. The hotel guard returns, forcing them to hide in an air vent. Sam finds a ladder that leads to a stage at the hotel restaurant, where the pair perform a comedy act. The hotel manager offers them a complimentary suite, with the promise that they perform again the following night.

The next morning, the pair discover that Dr. Hagen has dug multiple holes around the area. Hagen kidnaps Sam. Mac finally finds the tree marked with an “X”. Sam escapes and finds a way under the resort. Sam and Mac finally make it to the spot under the tree. Back at the airport, Grandpa berates Rick and tells him that Sam ran away because Rick lost his sense of joy, causing Rick to reflect.

While digging for the treasure, Sam begins to lose hope and Mac berates him for giving up. The pair fall out and Mac leaves. After encountering Hagen again, Sam escapes and heads up the ladder and onstage again, where he reunites with Mac and they reconcile. During their second performance, the guard arrives with backup, but Mac heads back to the maintenance room and feigns a fire alarm.

Making an escape back to the sewer tunnel, Mac and Sam finally find the treasure. Dr. Hagen arrives, forcing the pair to jump into a river leading to the harbor. Sam is captured by Dr. Hagen, who takes him and the treasure on a boat out to sea. Meanwhile, Sam's family follows them via police helicopter. Dr. Hagen tries to throw Sam overboard, but Sam survives, sneaks the treasure onto a lifeboat and cuts the boat's fuel line.

Mac arrives and attacks Hagen, stealing his cigar. He drops the cigar into the gasoline from the damaged fuel line and the boat explodes. Mac is knocked out, and is presumed dead. Rick finds Sam and saves him, and they reconcile. Mac is revealed to still be alive, and is rescued too. Sam reunites with his family and Dr. Hagen is arrested. Rick apologizes to Grandpa and promises to let him keep his home.

The treasure is recovered, but Grandpa declines it and says that the treasure belongs to the people. Sam returns the treasure to the Amazon and is hailed a hero. Mac decides to stay in the rainforest, realising it's where he belongs. After bidding farewell, Mac finally reunites with his mother.

== Cast ==
- Jamie Croft as Sam Girdis
- Deborra-Lee Furness as Beth Girdis
- Joe Petruzzi as Rick Girdis
- John Waters as Dr. Lance Hagen
- Jason Robards as Grandpa Girdis
- John Goodman as Mac the Parrot (voice) (North American version)
- Gerry Connolly as Lou Rickets
- Robert Coleby as Mr. St. John
- Petra Yared as Kathy Girdis
- Nathan Kotzur as Scarlatta
- Kevin Hides as Business Man on Plane
- Penny Everingham as Nurse Gimlet
- Murray Shoring as Dr. Thompson
- Daniel Murphy as Pet Store Owner/Mac the Parrot (voice) (Australian version)
- Anna-Maria La Spina as Museum Receptionist

== Box office ==
The Real Macaw grossed $741,876 at the box office in Australia.

== Reception ==
Australian film critics gave it generally positive reviews. Michael Bodey of The Age said that the film is "not sophisticated in plotting, but it is sophisticated enough to stand a Monty Python bird-poo reference before sweeping across generational troubles. It charms with its swashbuckling style and maturity and has a lot to recommend it". Vicky Roach of The Daily Telegraph said that "Mac certainly gets the parrot's share of the best lines in the film. [...] Mind you, despite his stereotypical shortcomings, he still had the younger members of the audience sitting on the edge of their seats. Sam's family also leave a lot to be desired. Even so, The Real Macaw is an appealing children's film with a wonderful central character (voice by Daniel Murphy) and a nicely-pitched, feel-good "green" ending" Des Partridge of The Courier Mail said that "children, the target audience of this Australian-made adventure with a 15-year-old hero (Jamie Croft), may be more forgiving of the implausibilities of the storyline than any accompanying adults will be. Treasure Island this isn't but the race for the buried treasure is moderately exciting and interest is added by the abundance of familiar Brisbane and south-east Queensland locations. [...] In keeping with the G-tradition, there's a happy ending, with family wounds healed when adventurer Sam is reunited with his mother (Deborra-Lee Furness), father, sister and grandfather. The scene is swamped by the treacly theme song that is heard over opening and closing credits before a feel-good finish that again demonstrates it is better to give than receive." Rob Lowing of The Sun-Herald said that it "doesn't match the technical standards of Babe—Mac's chats are strictly voice-over jobs with rollicking foreign accent—but the one-liners and constant references to movies are fun for the kids. There are plenty of animals scattered throughout the film and fast, funny slapstick involving a hotel restaurant and a ventriloquist show. The clear, unfussy directing is perfect for younger viewers and a credit to Napoleon director Mario Andreacchio. He's a definite talent to watch where crowd-pleasing family movies are concerned. The music is bright pop, from the likes of John Farnham and Mental As Anything. The cast is relaxed and obviously enjoying their straightforward roles. Veteran American import Robards does solid work as Grandpa, while Waters expertly plays larger than life as head villain. Some littlies could lose the plot, but there's no doubt that pre-teens will adore the mischievously bright-eyed talking parrot." Stan James of The Advertiser said that "Murphy/Mac spits out the gags faster than you can say 'feathers' and pretty they are in gold and blue. The children may miss the point with some of the gags but there's enough slapstick, squawks and fun to cover every generation which turns up to see a macaw make a monkey out of humans. Here, Andreacchio cuts to the chase again as he hurtles the action towards a spectacular and exciting climax." A reviewer in The Sunday Telegraph took a dimmer view of the movie, saying that "it's all pretty excruciating and lacking in originality. Even that great performer Robards finds it difficult to take this seriously. And the parrot is dubbed—but not with wit or grace." Dougal Macdonald seconded this sentiment in his review for The Canberra Times, where he remarked that "films about pirate treasure are supposed to be fun. Being rather short of pirates, The Real Macaw is a more than anything else a disappointment because, when you get down to its bones, it's not even about a macaw."

On Rotten Tomatoes The Real Macaw has two reviews listed: one positive; one negative.

=== Accolades ===
| Award | Category | Subject | Result |
|---|---|---|---|
| DVD Exclusive Awards | Best Supporting Actor | Jason Robards | Won |
| DVD Exclusive Awards | Best Original Score | Bill Conti | Nominated |

== See also ==
- Cinema of Australia
