= Jamie Croft =

Australian actor (born 1981)

- Born: 4 August 1981 (age 45); Sydney, Australia
- Occupation: Actor
- Years active: 1991–present
- Spouse: Saskia Burmeister (m. 2008)
- Children: 2

Jamie Croft (born 4 August 1981 in Sydney) is an Australian actor of television, film and voice, and television presenter.

== Career ==
Croft began his career in the television soap opera A Country Practice. He went on to appear in Police Rescue, Water Rats, Above the Law, Sun on the Stubble (a.k.a. The Valley Between), Farscape and Hercules.

Croft was one of the original hosts of Nickelodeon variety show Sarvo, alongside Josh Quong Tart.

He has also appeared in several films including, That Eye, The Sky, 20th Century Fox's Mighty Morphin Power Rangers: The Movie, The Real Macaw, Disappearance, Blurred and The Pact.

More recently, Croft has undertaken a substantial array of voice work for animated films and television series.

== Filmography ==
=== Film ===
Year	Title	Role	Type
1994	That Eye, The Sky	Morton 'Ort' Flack	Feature film
1995	Mighty Morphin Power Rangers: The Movie	Fred Kelman	Feature film
1995	Napoleon	Napoleon (voice)	Feature film
1996	The Territorians	Josh McCabe	TV movie
1997	Joey	Billy McGregor	Feature film
1998	The Real Macaw	Sam Girdis	Feature film
1998	Poppy's Head	Zeb	Short film
1999	Passion	Barrow Boy	Feature film
2002	Disappearance	Ethan	TV movie
2002	Blurred	Zack the Innocent	Feature film
2003	The Pact	Young Wilga Robers	Feature film
2004	Mary's Child		Short film
2004	The Lifting		Short film
2007	Gumnutz: A Juicy Tale	Claude (voice)	Animated TV movie
2008	Sunset Over Water	John	Short film
2012	My Mind's Own Melody	Medical Student	Short film
2014	YOLO	Ollie	Short film
2014	Between the Sand and the Sky		Video

=== Television ===
Year	Title	Role	Type
1991-93	A Country Practice	Billy Moss / Ashley Baker	TV series, 111 episodes
1994	G.P.	Troy O'Grady	TV series, 1 episode
1995	Police Rescue	Eddie	TV series, 1 episode
1995	Bordertown	Doon	TV miniseries, 1 episode
1995	Mission Top Secret	David Fowler	TV series, 6 episodes
1996	Fire	Ben Bain	TV series, 1 episode
1996	Sun on the Stubble (a.k.a. The Valley Between)	Bruno Gunther	TV miniseries, 6 episodes
1998, 2001	Water Rats	Rick Hawker / Danny Banks	TV series, 2 episodes
2000	All Saints	Adam Buckley	TV series, 1 episode
2000	Above the Law	Ryan Murcott	TV series, 3 episodes
2000	The Lost World	Rob Dillon	TV miniseries, 1 episode
2001	The Farm	Young Fred Cooper	TV miniseries, 3 episodes
2002	Farscape	Young John Crichton	TV series, 1 episode
2002–03	Sarvo	Host	TV series
2005	Hercules	Young Hercules	TV miniseries, 2 episodes
2007	Sea Princesses	Caramello (voice)	Animated TV series
2009	Pixel Pinkie	Coolest Luke (voice)	Animated TV series
2009	Zigby	Clem / Stink (voices)	Animated TV series, 52 episodes
2010	The Legend of Enyo	Enyo (voice)	Animated TV series, 26 episodes
2011	The DaVincibles	Pablo DaVinci / Mascot (voices)	Animated TV series, 1 episode
2012	Mrs Biggs	Sam	TV miniseries, 2 episodes
2015–16	Heidi	Karl / Sebastian / Mr Keller / William Hopfer (voices)	Animated TV series, 19 episodes
2016	The Wild Adventures of Blinky Bill	Bill Koala - Blinky's Dad (voice)	Animated TV series, episode 23A: "Home to Roost"

== Personal life ==
Croft is the brother of fellow actress Rebecca Croft.

In February 2008, he married his long-time girlfriend Saskia Burmeister. Their first son, Jackson Jay "JJ", was born in May 2012, and their second son, Bodhi Phoenix, was born in June 2014.
