= BedHead =

Australian comedy web series created by Jon Dalgaard

- Genre: Comedy
- Created by: Jon Dalgaard, Claire Phillips, Tom Keele, Reece A. Jones & Benjamin Mathews
- Written by: Jon Dalgaard, Claire Phillips, Tom Keele, Reece A. Jones & Benjamin Mathews
- Directed by: Benjamin Mathews
- Starring: Paul Ayre; Sarah Bishop; Andrew Steele; Jody Kennedy
- Country of origin: Australia
- Original language: English
- No. of seasons: 1
- No. of episodes: 5

Production
- Producers: Claire Phillips, Ben Mathews, Jon Dalgaard, Tom Keele & Miguel Rosado Boulet
- Production location: Sydney, Australia
- Editor: Anil Griffin
- Running time: 5 minutes
- Production company: Muffled Laughter

Original release
- Network: ABC iview
- Release: June 22, 2014

BedHead is a comedy web series created by Jon Dalgaard, Claire Phillips, Tom Keele, Reece A. Jones & Benjamin Mathews. Filmed in Sydney, Australia, the series allows the audience to hear the thoughts of two old friends, Paul and Sarah, who end up in bed together when Sarah comes to stay for the weekend.

== History ==
The series was conceived by Claire Phillips, Ben Mathews, Jon Dalgaard, Tom Keele and Reece A. Jones while studying together at the Australian Film, Television and Radio School. In February 2014, BedHead was selected as one of twenty-four finalists as part of FreshBlood, an initiative founded by the Australian Broadcasting Corporation and Screen Australia to “unearth the next generation of comedy creators.”

=== Plot ===
Paul finally decides to make a move when his old friend Sarah comes to stay for the weekend. But things don't quite go to plan and instead of triggering a weekend of passionate sex, Sarah's visit results in a series of disastrous, awkward encounters in Paul's bed that threaten to ruin their friendship forever.

== Release ==
BedHead was released on ABC iView on 22 June 2014 as the fourth and final installment of FreshBlood.

== Cast ==
- Paul Ayre
- Sarah Bishop
- Andrew Steele
- Jody Kennedy
