= Jetlag Productions =

American animation studio

- Type: Private
- Industry: Animation
- Genre: Children's films, direct-to-video productions
- Founded: 1988; 38 years ago
- Founder: Cayre Brothers
- Defunct: 1996; 30 years ago
- Fate: Assets acquired by Gaiam after GoodTimes Entertainment's bankruptcy
- Successor: Blye Migicovsky Productions
- Area served: Worldwide
- Key people: Joe Cayre, Ken Cayre, and Stan Cayre
- Products: Animated films and television series
- Services: Animation production
- Owner: GoodTimes Entertainment
- Parent: GoodTimes Entertainment

Jetlag Productions was a Japanese-American animation studio that specialized on developing several animated films based on popular fairy tales and public domain literature, and original productions during the 1990s. Its films were animated in Japan by KKC&D Asia and Animaru Ya, among other South Korean companies. They were originally released directly to VHS through the GoodTimes Home Video distribution company.

With the introduction of DVD, the films were later distributed via a newer department of the same company, GoodTimes Home Entertainment. The films in Jetlag's catalogue were dubbed into many different languages and distributed by international departments of the GoodTimes corporation. Since 2005, the Gaiam company has held the copyrights to Jetlag Productions' animated films following GoodTimes Entertainment's bankruptcy.

== History ==
Jetlag Productions started out as a small animation studio, assisting in the productions of series such as The New Adventures of He-Man and Heroes on Hot Wheels in 1990, and Conan the Adventurer in 1992, until it was approached by Joe, Ken, and Stan Cayre (known artistically as the Cayre Brothers) of GoodTimes Entertainment. The company then replaced Golden Films as GoodTimes's provider of budget animated productions, when the contract with Golden Film expired.

Under the name of their new establishment, the Cayre Brothers produced Children's Classics, a series of animated films that were very similar to those from Golden Films in style. Beginning their releases in 1994, Jetlag Productions produced a total of 17 different animated films, 13 adaptations of existing material, and four original features. All 17 films were around 45 minutes in length, and were released as direct-to-video VHS features, under the "GoodTimes" name by GoodTimes Home Video.

Their last release was The Hunchback of Notre Dame, which was released on April 30, 1996, just before GoodTimes turned to a new company, Blye Migicovsky Productions, for their new line of animation releases. Jetlag Productions' films were revived on DVD under a "Collectible Classics" label in 2002 by GoodTimes Entertainment. The new releases were widely available until GoodTimes filed for bankruptcy in 2005 and all assets were transferred to Gaiam.

== Title listing ==
=== TV series ===
- The New Adventures of He-Man (1990)
- Heroes on Hot Wheels (1990)
- Conan the Adventurer (1992)
- The Bots Master (1993)

=== Myths and legends adaptations ===
- Pocahontas (1994), also known as The Adventures of Pocahontas: Indian Princess, based on the life of Pocahontas
- Hercules (1995), based on the legendary hero from Greek mythology

=== Fairy tale and short story adaptations ===
- Cinderella (1994), based on Charles Perrault's fairy tale and also on the Brothers Grimm's 1697 and 1812 fairy tale
- Little Red Riding Hood (1995), based on Charles Perrault's fairy tale and the Brothers Grimm's 1697 and 1812 fairy tale
- Sleeping Beauty (1995), based on Charles Perrault's fairy tale and the Brothers Grimm's 1697 and 1812 fairy tale
- Snow White (1995), based on the Brothers Grimm's 1812 fairy tale
- The Nutcracker (1995), based on E. T. A. Hoffmann's 1816 short story
- The Jungle Book (1995), based on the "Mowgli" stories from Rudyard Kipling's 1894 short story collection

=== Literary novel adaptations ===
- The Hunchback of Notre Dame (1996), based on Victor Hugo's 1831 novel
- A Christmas Carol (1994), based on Charles Dickens's 1843 novella
- Alice in Wonderland (1995), based on Lewis Carroll's 1865 novel
- Black Beauty (1995), based on Anna Sewell's 1877 novel
- Heidi (1995), based on Johanna Spyri's 1880 novel

=== Original works ===
- Leo the Lion: King of the Jungle (1994), written by George Bloom
- Happy, the Littlest Bunny (1994), written by Larry Hartstein
- Magic Gift of the Snowman (1995), written by Larry Hartstein
- Curly, the Littlest Puppy (1995), written by Larry Hartstein

== Music ==
Unlike its predecessor, Golden Films, Jetlag Productions did not rely on familiar classical compositions as the soundtrack to their films (the only exception would be Heidi, which featured a variation of Edvard Grieg's "Morning Mood"). Instead, a variety of original compositions were created from scratch, produced by Andrew Dimitroff.

=== Original songs ===
As a general rule that went unbroken in all of their seventeen animated films, each film featured three original songs performed by a variety of singers. Jetlag Productions' successor for GoodTimes Entertainment, Blye Migicovsky Productions, continued this trend in their films. The instrumental bases to these original songs were sometimes used as part of the soundtrack outside the main musical numbers, as was the case in Hercules (1995) and Little Red Riding Hood (1995), among others. Though these musical numbers were placed into the films in often formulaic patterns, there were a few exceptions: A Christmas Carol (1994) was the only film to not feature an opening musical number, while Hercules (1995) was unusual in that it ended with an instrumental version of "Son of Zeus" rather than a vocal version. Though the vast majority of the songs were performed by off-screen voices, Snow White (1995)'s "Hip Hip Hooray", Magic Gift of the Snowman (1995)'s "Sleep and Dream", Cinderella (1994)'s "(It's the) Chance of a Lifetime", and Leo the Lion: King of the Jungle (1994)'s "Out on My Own" were sung by actual characters within the films; Cinderella (1994)'s "When Love Has Gone Away" was the only duet performed by characters from the film, sung by Cinderella and the prince, respectively. The songs from Jetlag's films included "Dream On, Cinderella" from Cinderella, "Start With A Smile", "This Is Home" and "(We're) The Very Best Of Friends" from Heidi, "Never Give Up" from Hercules, "Hold Your Head High" from Black Beauty, among various others.

=== Musicians ===
The composers and lyricists involved in original soundtracks. Among these credits, the following artists were credited as:

- Music producer: Andrew Dimitroff
- Composers: Nick Carr, Ray Crossley and Andrew Dimitroff
- Lyricist: Joellyn Cooperman

==== Credited musicians ====
- Ray Crossley
- Andrew Dimitroff
- Milcho Leviev
- Mel Steinberg
- Leslie Woodbury

==== Uncredited vocalists ====
- Kathleen Barr (as the singing voice of Tooey in Leo the Lion: King of the Jungle (1994), performing "Out on My Own")
- Garry Chalk (as the voice of Leo in Leo the Lion: King of the Jungle (1994), performing "I'm a Really Nice Guy")
- Wendy K. Hamilton-Caddey (for songs such as "A Little Bit of Magic", "The Season of Love", "Keep Christmas in Your Heart", and "Land of Pocahontas", among others)
