= Toshi Hiruma =

American film producer

Toshiyuki "Toshi" Hiruma (比留間 敏之, Hiruma Toshiyuki) is a Japanese film producer, who has produced Batman: Gotham Knight, The Batman, Kangaroo Jack: G'Day U.S.A.!, Daffy Duck for President, Justice League and What's New, Scooby-Doo?. He directed many animated movies in the 1990s with fellow director Takashi Masunaga for Jetlag Productions.

== TV Series ==
- Lupin the 3rd Part II (1979)
- The New Adventures of Gigantor (1980)
- Jarinko Chie (1981)
- Inspector Gadget (1983) - TMS Entertainment/Telecom Animation Film, K.K. DIC
- Rainbow Brite (1984) - TMS Entertainment/Telecom Animation Film, K.K. DIC
- Heathcliff and the Catillac Cats (1984) - TMS Entertainment/Telecom Animation Film, K.K. DIC
- Galaxy High School (1986) - TMS Entertainment/Telecom Animation Film
- Bionic Six (1987) - TMS Entertainment/Telecom Animation Film
- Fox's Peter Pan & the Pirates (1990) - TMS Entertainment/Telecom Animation Film
- King Arthur and the Knights of Justice (1992)
- The Adventures of T-Rex (1992)
- The Bots Master (1993)
- Project G.e.e.K.e.R. (1996) - Hanho Heung-Up
- Extreme Ghostbusters (1997) - Koko Enterprises
- Men in Black: The Series (1997) - Mook, Koko Enterprises
- Channel Umptee-3 (1997) - Koko Enterprises
- Godzilla: The Series (1998) - DR Movie, Dong Woo Animation, Lotto, New Millennium, Samwon
- Dragon Tales (1999 Season1) - Big Star, Dongwoo, Lotto, Sunwoo, Wang Film, Yearim, Yeson
- Big Guy and Rusty the Boy Robot (1999) - DR Movie, Dong Woo Animation, Koko Enterprises, Lotto Animation, Samwon
- Jackie Chan Adventures (2000 Season1) - Dong Woo Animation, Rough Draft Korea

== Movie ==
- Lupin III: The Castle of Cagliostro (1979)
- Chie the Brat (1981)
- SANSHIRO (1981※TV Movie)
- Ohayō! Spank (1982)

== Video ==
- Cinderella (? 1994)
- Leo the Lion: King of the Jungle (20 July 1994)
- Pocahontas (19 October 1994)
- Snow White (27 April 1995)
- Alice in Wonderland (31 July 1995)
- Little Red Riding Hood (31 July 1995)
