= Lists of animated television series =

These are lists of animated television series. Animated television series are television programs produced by means of animation. Animated series produced for theaters are not included in this lists; for those, see List of animated short film series. These lists include compilation series of theatrical shorts such as The Bugs Bunny Show since they often feature some new wrap-around animation.

== Lists by decade ==
- List of animated television series of the 1940s and 1950s
- List of animated television series of the 1960s
- List of animated television series of the 1970s
- List of animated television series of the 1980s
- List of animated television series of the 1990s
- List of animated television series of the 2000s
- List of animated television series of the 2010s
- List of animated television series of the 2020s
- List of animated television series of the 2030s
- List of animated television series of the 2040s
- List of animated television series of the 2050s
- List of animated television series of the 2060s
- List of animated television series of the 2070s
- List of animated television series of the 2080s
- List of animated television series of the 2090s
- List of animated television series of the 2100s
- List of animated television series of the 2110s
- List of animated television series of the 2120s
- List of animated television series of the 2130s
- List of animated television series of the 2140s
- List of animated television series of the 2150s
- List of animated television series of the 2160s
- List of animated television series of the 2170s
- List of animated television series of the 2180s
- List of animated television series of the 2190s
- List of animated television series of the 2200s
- List of animated television series of the 2210s
- List of animated television series of the 2220s
- List of animated television series of the 2230s
- List of animated television series of the 2240s
- List of animated television series of the 2250s

== Other lists ==
- List of animated television series created for syndication
- List of animated television series by episode count
- List of children's animated television series
- List of adult animated television series
- List of anime series by episode count
- List of anime franchises by episode count
- List of American animated television series
- List of Canadian animated television series
- List of Chinese animated television series
- List of French animated television series
- List of Indian animated television series
- List of Korean animated series
- List of Philippine animated television series
- List of South African animated television series
- List of Flash animated television series
- List of computer-animated television series
- List of animated series with LGBTQ characters

== See also ==
- Lists of animated films
