= List of animated television series of 1995 =

This is a list of animated television series first aired in 1995.

Animated television series first aired in 1995
Title	Seasons	Episodes	Country	Year	Original channel	Technique
Die Abenteuer von Max und Molly	1	13	Germany	1995–1996	Das Erste	Traditional
Ace Ventura: Pet Detective	3	41	Canada, US	1995–2000	CBS, Nickelodeon	Traditional
Action Man	1	26	US, UK	1995–1996	Syndication	Traditional, Live-Action
The Adventures of Hyperman	1	13	US	1995–1996	CBS	Traditional
The Babaloos	1	103	Canada, France	1995–1998	CBC Television	Traditional
Les Belles Histoires de Pomme d’Api	2	52	France	1995–1998	Canal J	Traditional
Big-Headed Kid and Small-Headed Father		156	China	1995	CCTV-1	Traditional
Bugs 'n' Daffy	2	130	US	1995–1997	Kids' WB	Traditional
The Caribou Kitchen	4	52	UK	1995	ITV	Traditional
Cartoon Planet	3	146	US	1995–1998; 2012–2014	Cartoon Network	Traditional
Les Contes de la rue Broca	1	26	France	1995	Canal J	Traditional
Crapston Villas	2	20	UK	1995–1998	Channel 4	Stop-Motion
Cyber Flash		350	France	1995–1997	Canal+	CGI
Darkstalkers	1	13	US	1995	Syndication	Traditional
Dodo, le retour	1	65	France	1995	Canal J	Traditional
Dr. Katz, Professional Therapist	6	81	US	1995–2002	Comedy Central	Traditional
Dumb and Dumber	1	13	US	1995–1996	ABC	Traditional
Earthworm Jim	2	23	US	1995–1996	Kids' WB	Traditional
Fantomcat	2	26	UK	1995–1996	ITV	Traditional
Foodie Fables	1	26	France	1995	France 3	Stop-Motion
The Forgotten Toys	1	26	UK	1995–1996	ITV	Traditional
Freakazoid!	2	24	US	1995–1997	Kids' WB	Traditional
G.I. Joe Extreme	2	26	US	1995–1997	Syndication	Traditional
Gadget Boy & Heather	2	52	France, US	1995–1998	M6, Syndication	Traditional
Happily Ever After: Fairy Tales for Every Child	3	39	US	1995–2000	HBO	Traditional
Happy Ness: The Secret of the Loch	1	13	UK	1995	Syndication	Traditional
The Hot Rod Dogs and Cool Car Cats	2	26	UK	1995–1996	CITV	Traditional
Hugo & Egon	1	20	Germany	1995		Traditional
Il était une fois...	1	26	France	1995	France 2	Traditional
Iznogoud	1	52	France	1995	Canal+	Traditional
Klutter!	1	8	US	1995–1996	Fox Kids	Traditional
Koby-Koby	3	30	South Korea	1995–1997	KBS2	Traditional
Little Bear	5	65	Canada, US	1995–2001	CBC, Nickelodeon	Traditional
The Little Lulu Show	3	52	US, Canada	1995–1999	HBO Family	Traditional
Littlest Pet Shop	1	40	US	1995	Syndication	Traditional
Lizzie's Library	1	26	Australia	1995	ABC	Stop-Motion
The Mask: Animated Series	3	54	US	1995–1997	CBS	Traditional
The Maxx	1	13	US	1995	MTV	Traditional
Mecki und seine Freunde	1	13	Germany, Hungary	1995	Das Erste	Traditional
Mina and the Count	1	6	US	1995–1999	Cartoon Network, Nickelodeon	Traditional
Monster Mania	1	26	US	1995-1996	Syndication	Traditional
Mortadelo y Filemón	2	26	Spain	1995	Antena 3	Traditional
Mot	1	26	France	1995	Canal+, France 3	Traditional
The Mozart Band	1	26	Spain	1995	TVE2	Traditional
Mr. Men and Little Miss	3	103	UK, France	1995–1997	ITV	Traditional
Les Multoches !	1	52	France	1995	Canal+	Traditional
The Neverending Story	1	26	Germany, Canada, France	1995–1996	HBO	Traditional
Nogalo	1	39	Croatia	1995	Croatian Radiotelevision	Traditional
Oakie Doke	2	26	UK	1995–1997	BBC One, BBC Two	Stop-Motion
Oscar and Friends	3	26	New Zealand	1995–1996	TV3	Stop-Motion
Oscar's Orchestra	3	39	UK, France	1995–1996	BBC	Traditional
Pinky and the Brain	4	65	US	1995–1998	Kids' WB	Traditional
Princess Gwenevere and the Jewel Riders	2	26	US	1995–1996	Syndication	Traditional
Les Sales Blagues de l'Écho	2	53	France	1995–1998	Canal+	Traditional
Santo Bugito	1	13	US	1995	CBS	Traditional
The Savage Dragon	2	26	US, Canada	1995–1996	USA Network	Traditional
The Shnookums & Meat Funny Cartoon Show	1	13	US	1995	Syndication	Traditional
Skysurfer Strike Force	2	26	US	1995–1996	Syndication	Traditional
Space Strikers	1	26	US, France	1995	M6, UPN	Traditional
Street Fighter	2	26	Canada, US	1995–1997	USA Network	Traditional
The Superman/Batman Adventures	1		US	1995	USA Network	Traditional
Sylvan	1	65	Spain	1995	TV3	Traditional
The Triplets	2	104	Spain	1995-2004	TV3, K3	Traditional
The Sylvester & Tweety Mysteries	5	52	US	1995–2002	Kids' WB	Traditional
Tenko and the Guardians of the Magic	1	13	US	1995–1996	Syndication	Traditional
Timon & Pumbaa	3	85	US	1995–1999	Syndication, CBS	Traditional
The Twisted Tales of Felix the Cat	2	21	US	1995–1997	CBS	Traditional
Ultraforce	1	13	Canada, US	1995	USA Network	Traditional
What a Cartoon!	1	16	US	1995–1997	Cartoon Network	Traditional
What-a-Mess	1	47	US	1995–1996	ABC	Traditional
Wolves, Witches and Giants	4	52	UK	1995–1998	ITV	Traditional

Anime television series first aired in 1995

Title	Seasons	Episodes	Country	Year	Original channel	Technique
Azuki-chan	3	117	Japan	1995–1998		Traditional
Bamboo Bears	1	52	Japan, France, Germany, Spain	1995–1996	TF1	Traditional
Bonobono	1	48	Japan	1995–1996		Traditional
The Brave of Gold Goldran	1	48	Japan	1995–1996		Traditional
Chibi Maruko-chan		1369+	Japan	1995–present		Traditional
Dokkan! Robotendon	1	26	Japan	1995–1996		Traditional
El-Hazard: The Wanderers	1	26	Japan	1995–1996		Traditional
Fushigi Yûgi	1	52	Japan	1995–1996		Traditional
Gulliver Boy	1	50	Japan	1995		Traditional
H2	1	41	Japan	1995–1996		Traditional
Jura Tripper	1	39	Japan	1995		Traditional
Juuni Senshi Bakuretsu Eto Ranger	1	39	Japan	1995–1996		Traditional
Magic Knight Rayearth 2	1	29	Japan	1995		Traditional
Mama Loves the Poyopoyo-Saurus	1	52	Japan	1995–1996		Traditional
Mobile Suit Gundam Wing	1	49	Japan	1995–1996		Traditional
Mojacko	1	74	Japan	1995–1997		Traditional
Neighborhood Story	1	50	Japan	1995–1996		Traditional
Neon Genesis Evangelion	1	26	Japan	1995–1996		Traditional
Ninku	1	55	Japan	1995–1996		Traditional
Nurse Angel Ririka SOS	1	35	Japan	1995–1996		Traditional
The Ping Pong Club	1	26	Japan	1995		Traditional
Romeo and the Black Brothers	1	33	Japan	1995		Traditional
Sailor Moon SuperS	1	39	Japan	1995–1996		Traditional
Saint Tail	1	43	Japan	1995–1996		Traditional
Slayers	1	26	Japan	1995		Traditional
Soar High! Isami	1	50	Japan	1995–1996		Traditional
Sorcerer Hunters	1	26	Japan	1995–1996		Traditional
Street Fighter II V	1	29	Japan	1995		Traditional
Tenchi Universe	1	26	Japan	1995		Traditional
Virtua Fighter	1	35	Japan	1995–1996		Traditional
Wedding Peach	1	51	Japan	1995–1996		Traditional
Wild Knights Gulkeeva	1	26	Japan	1995		Traditional
World Fairy Tale Series	1	26	Japan	1995		Traditional
Zenki	1	51	Japan	1995		Traditional

== See also ==
- List of animated feature films of 1995
- List of Japanese animation television series of 1995
