= Casa Del Kung Fu =

Casa Del Kung Fu are a theatre/performance/film group based in Vienna, Austria.

Founded by the infamous "Verein zur Förderung subventionierter Kunst" (German lit. "Society for the advancement of subsidized art") around 1993, they have put on many theatre plays and films screenings throughout Vienna.

Their most notable productions:

at the WUK theatre:

- The Supersonic Shakespeare Remix (1992)
- Die magische Flöte (The Magic Flute) (1993)
- Vietnamania (1995)
- Vietnamania II (1999)

at the Theater im Rabenhof:

- Die Räuber (2005) - Review in Austrian daily Der Standard (in German)
- Crackhouse of Horrors (2006) Review

Otakoo Saloon is an irregular film and performance night put on by Casa Del Kung Fu at venues throughout Austria since 1996. It features short films by a variety of contributors, as well as short performances and sketches written by Austrian writer & playwright Peter Waldeck.

Three characters, "Jimmy Magic Salsa", "New York Potato Department - N.Y.P.D." and "Fantastical Fly", featured frequently in short films and performances at the Otakoo Saloon nights have also starred in a 100-part web cartoon series by the same name: Otakoo Saloon Cartoon
