= List of animated television series of 1990 =

This is a list of animated television series first aired in 1990.

Animated television series first aired in 1990
Title	Seasons	Episodes	Country	Year	Original Channel	Technique
The Adventures of Don Coyote and Sancho Panda	2	26	United States; Italy	1990–91	Syndication; RAIUNO	Traditional
The Adventures of Super Mario Bros. 3	1	13	United States	1990	NBC	Traditional
Agro's Cartoon Connection	9	400	Australia	1990–97	Seven Network	Traditional/puppetry/Live-action
Attack of the Killer Tomatoes	2	21	United States	1990–91	Fox Children's Network	Traditional
Barnyard Commandos	1	13	United States; France	1990	Syndication	Traditional
Bertie the Bat	1	10	United Kingdom	1990	CITV	Traditional
Bill & Ted's Excellent Adventures	2	21	United States; Canada	1990–91	CBS; Fox	Traditional
Bobby's World	7	81	United States	1990–98	Fox Kids	Traditional/Live-action
Bump	2	27	United Kingdom	1990–94	BBC1	Traditional
C.L.Y.D.E.	1	26	Canada; France	1990–91	TF1; Family Channel; Global; YTV; Radio-Canada	Traditional
Captain Planet and the Planeteers	6	113	United States	1990–96	TBS; Syndication	Traditional
The Dreamstone	4	52	United Kingdom	1990–95	ITV	Traditional
Les Fables géométriques	5	50	France	1990–92	Canal+	CGI
Fender Bender 500	1	50	United States	1990–91	Syndication	Traditional
The Flying Superboard	5	54	South Korea	1990–2002	KBS2	Traditional
The Fruitties	1	91	Spain	1990–92	TVE	Traditional
Four-Mations	1	21	United Kingdom	1990–98	Channel 4	Traditional/CGI/Stop-Motion
Le Grand Ouah Ouah Bleu	1	15	France	1990	FR3	CGI
Gravedale High	1	13	United States	1990	NBC	Traditional
Kid 'n Play	1	13	United States	1990	NBC	Traditional
The Little Flying Bears	1	39	Canada; Croatia	1990–91	Family Channel	Traditional
Little Rosey	1	13	Canada; United States	1990	ABC	Traditional
Manu	2	133	France	1990–93	La Cinq; France 2	Traditional
Marianne 1ère	1	26	France	1990	Canal+	Traditional
Merrie Melodies Starring Bugs Bunny & Friends	1	65	United States	1990–94	Syndication (1990–92); Fox Kids (1992–94)	Traditional
Midnight Patrol: Adventures in the Dream Zone	1	13	United Kingdom; United States	1990	BBC1; The Children's Channel; Syndication	Traditional
Monster Tails	1	50	United States	1990–91	Syndication	Traditional
Nellie the Elephant	2	30	United Kingdom	1990	ITV	Traditional
The New Adventures of He-Man	1	65	United States	1990	Syndication	Traditional
New Kids on the Block	1	15	United States	1990	ABC	Traditional
Peter Pan & the Pirates	1	65	United States; Australia; Japan	1990–91	Fox Children's Network	Traditional
Piggsburg Pigs!	1	13	United States; Canada	1990	Fox Children's Network	Traditional
Pingu	6	156	Switzerland (original); United Kingdom (revival)	1990–2006	Schweizer Fernsehen; CBeebies (2003–06)	Stop-Motion
The Power Team	1	40	United States	1990–91	USA Network	Traditional
Quarxs	1	12	France	1990–93	Canal+	CGI
Sharky & George	2	52	Canada; France	1990–92	Canal+	Traditional
Sophie & Virginie	2	52	France	1990–92	TF1	Traditional
Swamp Thing	1	5	United States	1990–91	Fox Children's Network	Traditional
TaleSpin	1	65	United States	1990–91	The Disney Channel (preview); First-run syndication	Traditional
Tifou	1	25	Belgium	1990	France 3	Traditional
Tiny Toon Adventures	3	98	United States	1990–92	CBS (1990); Syndication (1990–92); Fox Kids (1992)	Traditional
Tom & Jerry Kids	4	65	United States	1990–1993	Fox Children's Network	Traditional
Toucan Tecs	1	26	United Kingdom	1990	ITV; S4C	Traditional
Wake, Rattle, and Roll	1	50	United States	1990–91	The Disney Channel; Syndication	Traditional
Wicked Willie	1	11	United Kingdom	1990–91	Channel 5	Traditional
Widget	2	65	United States	1990–91	Syndication; USA Network	Traditional
The Wizard of Oz	1	13	United States	1990	ABC	Traditional
Yeongsimi	1	13	South Korea	1990	KBS2	Traditional
Yesnal Yesjeog-e	1	13	South Korea	1990	KBS2	Traditional
Zazoo U	1	13	United States	1990	Fox Children's Network	Traditional

Anime television series first aired in 1990

Title	Seasons	Episodes	Country	Year	Original Channel	Technique
Brave Exkaiser	1	48	Japan	1990–91	Nagoya TV	Traditional
Chibi Maruko-chan	1	142	Japan	1990–92	Fuji TV	Traditional
Heisei Tensai Bakabon	1	46	Japan	1990	Fuji TV	Traditional
Idol Angel Yokoso Yoko	1	43	Japan	1990–91	TV Setouchi	Traditional
Karasu Tengu Kabuto	1	39	Japan	1990–91	NHK	Traditional
Kyatto Ninden Teyandee	1	54	Japan	1990–91	TV Tokyo	Traditional
Magical Angel Sweet Mint	1	47	Japan	1990–91	TV Tokyo	Traditional
Magical Taruruto	1	87	Japan	1990–92	TV Asahi	Traditional
Mashin Hero Wataru 2	1	46	Japan	1990–91	Nippon TV	Traditional
Mitsume ga Tōru	1	48	Japan	1990–91	TV Tokyo	Traditional
Moomin	1	78	Japan	1990–91	TV Tokyo	Traditional
Mōretsu Atarō (1990)	1	34	Japan	1990	TV Asahi	Traditional
Musashi, the Samurai Lord	1	50	Japan	1990–91	Nippon TV	Traditional
My Daddy Long Legs	1	40	Japan	1990	Fuji TV	Traditional
Nadia: The Secret of Blue Water	1	39	Japan	1990–91	NHK	Traditional
NG Knight Ramune & 40	1	38	Japan	1990–91	TV Tokyo	Traditional
Robin Hood	1	52	Japan	1990–92	NHK	Traditional
Sunset on Third Street	1	27	Japan	1990–91	TBS	Traditional
Tasuke, the Samurai Cop	1	22	Japan	1990–91	TV Tokyo	Traditional

== See also ==
- List of animated feature films of 1990
- List of Japanese animation television series of 1990
