= List of animated television series of the 1990s =

Lists of animated television series first aired in the 1990s organized by year:

- List of animated television series of 1990
- List of animated television series of 1991
- List of animated television series of 1992
- List of animated television series of 1993
- List of animated television series of 1994
- List of animated television series of 1995
- List of animated television series of 1996
- List of animated television series of 1997
- List of animated television series of 1998
- List of animated television series of 1999
