= List of animated television series of the 1970s =

Lists of animated television series first aired in the 1970s organized by year:

- List of animated television series of 1970
- List of animated television series of 1971
- List of animated television series of 1972
- List of animated television series of 1973
- List of animated television series of 1974
- List of animated television series of 1975
- List of animated television series of 1976
- List of animated television series of 1977
- List of animated television series of 1978
- List of animated television series of 1979
