= List of animated feature films of 1970 =

This is a list of animated feature films first released in 1970.

== List ==
Title	Country	Director	Production company	Animation technique	Format	Notes	Release date	Duration
30,000 Miles Under the Sea 海底3万マイル (Kaitei San-man Mile)	Japan	Takeshi Tamiya	Toei Animation	Traditional	Theatrical		July 19, 1970	60 minutes
Aladdin and His Magic Lamp; Aladin et la Lampe merveilleuse	France	Jean Image	Films Jean Image	Traditional	Theatrical		January 28, 1970	71 minutes
The Aristocats	United States	Wolfgang Reitherman	Walt Disney Productions	Traditional	Theatrical	One of the first Disney projects produced after Walt Disney's death in December 1966.	December 24, 1970	79 minutes
Attack No.1: The Movie アタック No.1 (Atakku Nanbā Wan)	Japan	Eiji Okabe	Tokyo Movie Shinsha	Traditional	Theatrical		March 21, 1970	63 minutes
Attack No.1: Revolution アタック No.1涙の回転レシーブ (Atakku Nanbā Wan: Namida no Kaiten Receive)	Japan	Eiji Okabe	Tokyo Movie Shinsha	Traditional	Theatrical		August 1, 1970	60 minutes
Attack No.1: World Championship アタック No.1涙の世界選手権 (Atakku Nanbā Wan: Namida no Sekai Senshuken)	Japan	Eiji Okabe	Tokyo Movie Shinsha	Traditional	Theatrical		December 19, 1970	63 minutes
The Blue Bird; Синяя птица (Sinyaya ptitsa)	Soviet Union	Vasily Livanov	Soyuzmultfilm	Traditional/Cutout	Theatrical			99 minutes
Cleopatra クレオパトラ (Kureopatora)	Japan	Eiichi Yamamoto; Osamu Tezuka	Mushi Production; Nippon Herald Films	Traditional	Theatrical	Second film in the anthology film series Animerama.	September 15, 1970	112 minutes
A Connecticut Yankee in King Arthur's Court	Australia	Zoran Janjic	Air Programs International	Traditional	Television film	Originally aired as the second installment of the CBS animated anthology series Famous Classic Tales (1970–1984).	November 26, 1970	74 minutes
Dougal and the Blue Cat; Pollux et le Chat bleu	United Kingdom; France	Serge Danot	Goodtimes Enterprises	Stop motion	Theatrical		December 23, 1970	85 minutes
...ere erera baleibu izik subua aruaren...	Spain	José Antonio Sistiaga	X Films	Hand painted	Theatrical; Experimental film		November 1970	75 minutes
Fablio the Magician; Fablio le magicien	France; Hungary; Bulgaria; Romania	Georges de la Grandière; Attila Dargay; Radka Badcharova; Victor Antonescu	Pannónia Filmstúdió; E D. I. C. Films; Animafilm Studio; Sofia Animation Studio	Traditional				72 minutes
The Mad, Mad, Mad Comedians	United States; Japan	Jules Bass; Arthur Rankin Jr.	Rankin/Bass; Mushi Production	Traditional	Television special		April 7, 1970	60 minutes
Mort & Phil's Second Festival; Segundo festival de Mortadelo y Filemón	Spain	Rafael Vara	Estudios Vara; Antonio Salado Crespo (distributor)	Traditional	Theatrical	Second compilation film of the Spanish animated short film series Mortadelo y Filemón (1966-1971), that ran for 23 6-minute installments and was based on the comic strip of the same title by Francisco Ibáñez.		64 minutes
Nobody's Boy ちびっ子レミと名犬カピ (Chibikko Rémi to Meiken Capi)	Japan	Yugo Serikawa	Toei Animation	Traditional	Theatrical		March 17, 1970	81 minutes
The Phantom Tollbooth	United States	Chuck Jones; Abe Levitow; Dave Monahan (live action)	MGM Animation/Visual Arts	Traditional/Live action	Theatrical	The film was the final animated production released by MGM, as they left the animation industry completely; produced in 1968, but held up from release until late 1970.	November 7, 1970	89 minutes
Santa and the Three Bears	United States	Tony Benedict; Barry Mahon (live action)		Traditional/Live action	Theatrical		November 7, 1970	46 minutes
Santa Claus Is Comin' to Town	United States; Japan	Jules Bass; Arthur Rankin Jr.	Rankin/Bass; Video Tokyo Production	Stop motion	Television special		December 14, 1970	48 minutes
Shinbone Alley	United States	John David Wilson	Fine Arts Films	Traditional	Theatrical	Rated G for theatrical and early video releases, re-rated PG for DVD release.	June 26, 1970	85 minutes
Star of the Giants: Big League Ball 巨人の星 大リーグボール (Kyojin no Hoshi: Dai League Ball)	Japan	Tadao Nagahama	Tokyo Movie Shinsha	Traditional	Theatrical	Film compiled from episodes 70 ("Hidari Mon no Yokoku Houmuran") and 77 ("Hanagata Sutemi no Chousen") of the anime television series, which aired from March 30, 1968, until September 18, 1971, for a total of 182 episodes.	March 21, 1970	70 minutes
Star of the Giants: The Fateful Showdown 巨人の星 宿命の対決 (Kyojin no Hoshi: Shukumei no Taiketsu)	Japan	Tadao Nagahama	Tokyo Movie Shinsha	Traditional	Theatrical	Film compiled from episodes 79 ("Ourusutaa no Deki Goto") and 83 ("Kizu Darake no Houmuin") of the anime television series, which aired from March 30, 1968, until September 18, 1971, for a total of 182 episodes.	August 1, 1970	65 minutes
Tales of Washington Irving	Australia; United States	Zoran Janjic	Air Programs International	Traditional	Anthology film Television special	Originally aired as the first installment of the CBS animated anthology series Famous Classic Tales (1970–1984).	November 1, 1970	60 minutes
Tiger Mask タイガーマスク (Taigā Masuku)	Japan	Takeshi Tamiya	Toei Animation	Traditional	Theatrical	Film compiled from episodes 9 ("The Starved Gorilla Man") and 10 ("Fresh-Bomb Megaton Drop") of the anime television series, which aired from October 2, 1969, until September 30, 1971, for a total of 105 episodes.	March 17, 1970	47 minutes
Tiger Mask: War Against the League of Masked Wrestlers タイガーマスク ふく面リーグ戦 (Taigā Masuku: Fuku Men League Sen)	Japan	Takeshi Tamiya	Toei Animation	Traditional	Theatrical	Film compiled from episodes 23 ("Tiger Risks His Life") and 26 ("Beyond the Glory") of the anime television series, which aired from October 2, 1969, until September 30, 1971, for a total of 105 episodes.	July 19, 1970	53 minutes
Uncle Sam Magoo	United States	Abe Levitow	United Productions of America; NBC	Traditional	Television special	Sponsored by Maxwell House; this special was UPA's last attempt to bring Mr. Magoo to prime time.	February 15, 1970	60 minutes

== See also ==
- List of animated television series of 1970
