= List of animated television series of the 2020s =

These are lists of animated television series first aired in the 2020s, organized by year:

- List of animated television series of 2020
- List of animated television series of 2021
- List of animated television series of 2022
- List of animated television series of 2023
- List of animated television series of 2024
- List of animated television series of 2025
- List of animated television series of 2026
- List of animated television series of 2027
- List of animated television series of 2028
- List of animated television series of 2029
