= Nogalo (TV series) =

Croatian animated television series

- Also known as: Footsy
- Genre: Animated television series
- Created by: Ivica Šegvić
- Country of origin: Croatia
- No. of episodes: 39

Production
- Running time: 2–3 minutes
- Production company: Croatian Radiotelevision

Original release
- Network: Croatian Radiotelevision
- Release: 1995

Nogalo (English: Footsy) is a Croatian animated television series created by Ivica Šegvić for Croatian Radiotelevision.

== Synopsis ==
The series is centered on a blue humanoid creature whose head and feet are of the same shape, making the interchangeable. The short is accompanied by music often in sync with the animation.

== History ==
=== Creation ===
The initial idea for the show came at an animation workshop for beginners, in front of the Kinoteka in Split, Croatia, where Ivica Šegvić eventually assembled a team to fully flesh out his idea.

=== Broadcast ===
The first episode, "Glava za kapu", was shown at festivals in Zagreb and Chicago (1994), as well as Cannes, France, where it got a positive reception. Croatian Radiotelevision produced a total of 39 episodes, and the show was also broadcast abroad in countries like Hong Kong, Israel, France, Germany, Sweden, Italy, Slovenia and Bosnia and Herzegovina. The show is animated using the traditional 2D hand-drawn technique, and each episode is roughly 3 minutes long. Notable animator Joško Marušić was employed as a supervisor.
