= List of animated television series of the 2010s =

These are lists of animated television series first aired in the 2010s, organized by year:

- List of animated television series of 2010
- List of animated television series of 2011
- List of animated television series of 2012
- List of animated television series of 2013
- List of animated television series of 2014
- List of animated television series of 2015
- List of animated television series of 2016
- List of animated television series of 2017
- List of animated television series of 2018
- List of animated television series of 2019
