= List of Tenchi Universe episodes =

Tenchi Universe (Tenchi Muyo! in Japan) is a Japanese television series produced by AIC and Pioneer LDC. An alternate re-telling of the original seasons of Tenchi Muyo! Ryo-Ohki, the 26-episode series aired on TV Tokyo from April 2, 1995, to September 24, 1995. In the US, the show aired on Cartoon Network's Toonami block from July 20, 2000, to August 24, 2000. The series is split into three arcs.

== Episodes ==
=== Earth Adventure ["Chikyū-hen" (地球篇)] (episodes 1-10) ===
No.	Title	Original release date	US airdate
1	"No Need for Discussions!"; Transliteration: "Mondō Muyō!" (Japanese: 問答無用!)	April 2, 1995	November 26, 1996
Pursued by Galaxy Police Detective Mihoshi, Ryoko crash lands on Earth and interjects herself into the lives of the Masaki family, particularly the teenage son Tenchi.
2	"No Need for a Princess!"; Transliteration: "Ōjo Muyō!" (Japanese: 皇女無用!)	April 9, 1995	November 26, 1996
Mihoshi activates a distress signal, to which Princess Ayeka responds. Rivalries between Ryoko and Ayeka ignite and all wind up stuck on Earth.
3	"No Need for Worries!"; Transliteration: "Shinpai Muyō!" (Japanese: 心配無用!)	April 16, 1995	November 26, 1996
Sasami goes in search of her older sister Ayeka and is caught up in the growing and conflicting household.
4	"No Need for Monsters!"; Transliteration: "Yōkai Muyō!" (Japanese: 妖怪無用!)	April 23, 1995	November 26, 1996
During local festivities, Ryoko becomes fascinated with the legend about a monster entombed in a cave shrine. Conflicts with Ayeka ensue and the monster is revealed to be Washu, a mad scientist.
5	"No Need for Partners!"; Transliteration: "Aibō Muyō!" (Japanese: 相棒無用!)	April 30, 1995	February 25, 1997
Kiyone gleefully celebrates the "passing" of her mismatched partner Mihoshi until superiors ask her to investigate the possibility that Mihoshi might be alive on the isolated planet Earth.
6	"No Need for Resident Officers!"; Transliteration: "Chūzai Muyō!" (Japanese: 駐在無用!)	May 7, 1995	February 25, 1997
Mihoshi and Kiyone are reassigned to Earth, much to Kiyone's chagrin. Having to adjust to the high cost of living, both take a series of part-time jobs while still being on-call for galaxy police emergencies.
7	"No Need for a Carnival!"; Transliteration: "Ennichi Muyō!" (Japanese: 縁日無用!)	May 14, 1995	February 25, 1997
The extraterrestrial group participates at all levels when festivities are held at the Masaki Shrine.
8	"No Need for a Genius!"; Transliteration: "Tensai Muyō!" (Japanese: 天才無用!)	May 21, 1995	April 29, 1997
Washu is determined to get back in the game with a series of inventions, starting with a mecha clone of herself; plans go awry when Mihoshi gets involved.
9	"No Need for Memories!"; Transliteration: "Tsuioku Muyō!" (Japanese: 追憶無用!)	May 28, 1995	April 29, 1997
A winter snowfall elicits various responses from the household, culminating in the annual observation of the death of Tenchi's mother.
10	"No Need for an Arch Rival!"; Transliteration: "Shukuteki Muyō!" (Japanese: 宿敵無用!)	June 4, 1995	April 29, 1997
Bounty hunter Nagi catches up with Ryoko and kidnaps Tenchi to lure her away from the safety of the group.

=== Time and Space Adventures ["Tokubetsu Kōgyō" (特別興行)] (episodes 11-13) ===
These episodes are an adaptation of the drama CD Tenchi Muyo! Special: Creation of the Universe Journey across Space-Time with the exception of Ayeka's and Kiyone's tales, which were created for episodes 11 and 12 respectively. The former tale was supposed to be on the aforementioned CD but was cut out due to time constraints.

No.	Title	Original release date	US airdate
11	"Time and Space Adventures: Part I"; Transliteration: "Tenchikaibyaku Jikū Michiyu – Zenpen" (Japanese: 天地開闢 時空道行 前編)	June 11, 1995	June 3, 1997
Washu invents a machine capable of generating alternative realities to the specifics of the user. Curious and competing members of the extraterrestrial group overwhelm the machine and disappear into the new realities. In the First Part, the group participates in Ayeka's world in Heian period Japan where she and Tenchi are arranged to be married only after he defeats the Rashomon who is Ryoko.
12	"Time and Space Adventures: Part II"; Transliteration: "Tenchikaibyaku Jikū Michiyu – Chūhen" (Japanese: 天地開闢 時空道行 中編)	June 18, 1995	June 3, 1997
Washu continues repairs and attempts to bring them back by eliminating worlds one at a time. In the second part, Kiyone imagines life as a drifter in a local inn after an abrupt career change. In Sasami's world, she becomes a magical girl heroine who interjects herself in the high school love triangle of Ayeka, Tenchi, and Ryoko.
13	"Time and Space Adventures: Part III"; Transliteration: "Tenchikaibyaku Jikū Michiyu – Kōhen" (Japanese: 天地開闢 時空道行 後編)	June 25, 1995	June 3, 1997
Repairs and rescue by Washu are almost complete. In Mihoshi's world, she is a housewife married to Tenchi, while Ayeka and Ryoko are her critical sister-in-law and flirting neighbor, respectively. In Ryoko's world, Tenchi and she are Bonnie and Clyde characters on the run from FBI Agents Kiyone and Mihoshi.

=== Space Adventure ["Uchū-hen" (宇宙篇)] (Episodes 14-26) ===
No.	Title	Original release date	US airdate
14	"No Need for a Rebellion!"; Transliteration: "Hanran Muyō!" (Japanese: 反乱無用!)	July 2, 1995	June 24, 1997
Incredible events within the Jurai monarchy result in the arrest of Princess Ayeka, Sasami, and Ryoko by royal guards and Kiyone and Mihoshi are recalled to Galaxy Police headquarters. The Masaki family, Washu, and Ryo-ohki launch a rescue mission.
15	"No Need for an Escape!"; Transliteration: "Tōbō Muyō!" (Japanese: 逃亡無用!)	July 9, 1995	June 24, 1997
The Masaki family, Washu, and now Mihoshi and Kiyone help the captives escape from Galaxy Police Headquarters.
16	"No Need for Hiding!"; Transliteration: "Senpuku Muyō!" (Japanese: 潜伏無用!)	July 16, 1995	June 24, 1997
Determined to get to Jurai and low on resources, the group opens a bar with themselves as bartenders and hostesses. Nagi drops in determined to capture Ryoko.
17	"No Need for Hunger!"; Transliteration: "Kōfuku Muyō!" (Japanese: 空腹無用!)	July 23, 1995	August 26, 1997
A combination of engine troubles and low supplies strands the group without any food. Ryoko takes last of the cash on hand and vows to return with food.
18	"No Need for a Ghost!"; Transliteration: "Yūrei Muyō!" (Japanese: 幽霊無用!)	July 30, 1995	August 26, 1997
The group's space ship inexplicably breaks down in an unusual area of space. After encountering an abandoned passenger ship, Sasami disappears following an ethereal young girl.
19	"No Need for Runaways!"; Transliteration: "Bakuhashi Muyō!" (Japanese: 爆走無用!)	August 6, 1995	August 26, 1997
The group's space ship is hijacked by juvenile delinquents during a rest stop.
20	"No Need for Swimsuits!"; Transliteration: "Mizugi Muyō!" (Japanese: 水着無用!)	August 13, 1995	August 26, 1997
Again low on cash, the group sets up a snack shop and takes part-time jobs on a beach resort. Rivalries ignite again during a swimsuit competition and are further exacerbated by Nagi's participation.
21	"No Need for a Checkpoint!"; Transliteration: "Sekisho Muyō!" (Japanese: 関所無用!)	August 20, 1995	August 26, 1997
To get to Jurai, the group attempt to cross a necessary checkpoint disguised as members of a school field trip.
22	"No Need for Knights!"; Transliteration: "Kishi Muyō!" (Japanese: 騎士無用!)	August 27, 1995	August 26, 1997
The group inadvertently crash lands on a mysterious property within the Jurai galaxy at Grandfather Katsuhito's request. Such esoteric knowledge becomes a revelation about the Masaki family and grandfather enlists the help of fabled knights to restore the monarchy.
23	"No Need for Karma!"; Transliteration: "Innen Muyō!" (Japanese: 因縁無用!)	September 3, 1995	December 16, 1997
Katsuhito recounts the enmity between himself and Kagato, who is trying to usurp Katsuhito's legitimate position within the Jurai monarchy. They confront one another and Ayeka is kidnapped.
24	"No Need for Ryoko!"; Transliteration: "Ryōko Muyō!" (Japanese: 魎呼無用!)	September 10, 1995	December 16, 1997
Motivated to rescue Ayeka and stop Kagato, the group initiates an assault on the Jurai Palace. Ryoko takes the lead in a diversionary plan against Jurai forces.
25	"No Need for a Showdown!"; Transliteration: "Kessen Muyō!" (Japanese: 決戦無用!)	September 17, 1995	December 16, 1997
Tenchi and the fabled knights battle their way to the throne room, culminating in a face-off between Kagato and himself.
26	"No Need for a Conclusion!"; Transliteration: "Ketsuron Muyō!" (Japanese: 結論無用!)	September 24, 1995	December 16, 1997
In an epilogue, Tenchi discusses the fate of most of the group, all of whom have their reputations restored or rewarded. Despite such acknowledgements, all become fond of their experience on Earth and return to the Masaki household.

== Home media ==
Tenchi Universe was licensed in the US by Geneon Entertainment in 1996, who brought the show onto LaserDisc, VHS, and DVD before ceasing production in September 2007. In 2010, Funimation Entertainment announced the licenses of a handful of Geneon titles including Tenchi Universe. An official boxset was released on October 16, 2012.

North American DVD releases
Vol. #	Title	Release date	Disc	Episode count
1	On Earth I	June 26, 2000; January 6, 2004 (Note: Signature Series)	1	4
2	On Earth II	August 22, 2000; March 9, 2004	1	3
3	On Earth III	September 26, 2000; May 11, 2004	1	3
4	Time & Space Adventures	November 11, 2000; July 13, 2004	1	3
5	Space I	December 26, 2000; September 14, 2004	1	3
6	Space II	January 30, 2001; November 6, 2004	1	3
7	Space III	February 27, 2001; January 5, 2005	1	3
8	The Last Battle	March 27, 2001; March 1, 2005	1	4
N/A	Box Set	October 19, 2001	8	26
N/A	Complete Collection	June 19, 2007	8	26
N/A	The Complete Series	October 16, 2012	4	26

North American LaserDisc releases
Vol. #	Title	Release date	Discs / sides	Episode count
1	The Tenchi Universe Collection I Tenchi Muyo on Earth 1 TV Series	10 Dec 1996	2 / 4	4
2	The Tenchi Universe Collection II; Tenchi Muyo on Earth 2 TV Series	25 Feb 1997	2 / 3	3
3	The Tenchi Universe Collection III; Tenchi Muyo on Earth 3 TV Series	29 Apr 1997	2 / 3	3
4	The Tenchi Universe Collection; Tenchi Muyo Time Travel and Space Adventures TV Series	3 Jun 1997	2 / 3	3
5	The Tenchi Universe Collection Space I Tenchi Muyo in Space 1 TV Series	1 Jul 1997	2 / 3	3
6	The Tenchi Universe Collection Space II; Tenchi Muyo in Space 2 TV Series	2 Sep 1997	2 / 3	3
7	The Tenchi Universe Collection Space III; Tenchi Muyo in Space 3 TV Series	25 Nov 1997	2 / 3	3
8	The Tenchi Universe Collection; Tenchi Muyo: The Last Battle TV Series	27 Jan 1998	2 / 4	4
