= List of Philippine animated television series =

The following are a list of Philippine animated television series. Included are works which is in-full or partially produced by a production studio or entity based in the Philippines.

This excludes:

- Live action television series that happens to heavily uses computer-generated imagery (CGI) both in a single episode or across multiple episodes. Unless such works had to be described by reliable sources such works in whole as live-action animation.
- Television series produced by international studios which were subcontracted to Philippine-based firms (outsourced) or just happens to have individual Filipinos among its production team. (e.g. Top Draw with My Little Pony, Toon City with seasons 1 and 2 of Rick and Morty and season 1 of Hazbin Hotel).

== List ==
| Date | Title | Creator(s) | Network | Technique | Episodes | Synopsis | Ref. |
|---|---|---|---|---|---|---|---|
| 1980s | Poptech | Nonoy Marcelo | N/A | Traditional | 4 (lost) | N/A | |
| 1986–1988 | Ang Panday | Geraldo A. Garccia | RPN | Traditional | 3 (partially lost) (Note: While the remaining partially-lost clip of three episodes found, almost all of the episodes were lost.) | Based on a komic character by Carlo J. Caparas and Steve Gan and 1980 film of the same name by Ronwaldo Reyes, the series take place after the storyline of the first film. | |
| 1987 | Captain Barbell | N/A | RPN | Traditional | N/A | Based on a komik superhero of the same name by Mars Ravelo and Jim Fernandez. | |
| 1987 | Darna | N/A | Channel 7 | Traditional | N/A | Based on a komik superheroine of the same name by Mars Ravelo and Nestor Redondo, the story begins with a village young woman named Narda who finds a small white stone, a tiny meteorite from outer space. Narda swallows the stone and shouts "Darna!" she becomes a mighty warrior ready to defend Earth from evil forces. | |
| 2007 | The Nutshack | Ramon Lopez and Jesse Hernandez | Myx TV | Flash | 16 (two seasons) | The series revolves two distant cousins, Phil, from the San Francisco Bay Area, and Jack, from the Philippines, who live with their uncle, Tito Dick, in south-suburban Daly City. | |
| 2006–2010 | Captain Flamingo | Suzanne Bolch and John May | GMA Network | Flash | 52 (three seasons) | Captain Flamingo strives to become the pint-sized hero all kids can turn to. | |
| 2009–2011 | Super Inggo at ang Super Tropa | Enrico C. Santos | ABS-CBN | Anime-inspired | 14 | The series tells the story of Budong, a poor boy who has a secret life as the superhero Super Inggo. | |
| 2014 | Next Quest | Matt Barretto | YouTube | Flash | 3 | An animated miniseries about the four scrubs on a quest to become badasses | |
| 2015–2016 | Alamat | Jeffrey John Imutan | GMA Pictures | Flash | 12 (two seasons) | Animated anthology series featuring famous stories from Philippine folklore. | |
| 2018–2021 | Barangay 143 | Katski Flores | GMA Network (season 1); POPTV (season 2) | Anime-inspired | 26 (two seasons) | A young man of Filipino and Korean descent who went to Manila to search for his long-lost father, all while he entered a local basketball league at a barangay in Tondo. | |
| 2021 | Jelly, Ben and Pogo | Jalysa Leva | PBS Kids | Flash | 21 | Adventures of a brother and sister and a sea monster while learning some Filipino culture. | |
| 2021 | Heneral Tuna | Avid Liongoren | Kumu | Flash | 7 | Heneral Tuna, an alien cat from the Planet Mingming is tasked to invade Earth and accidentally crashlands in Barangay Hiraya in the Philippines. Not wanting to waste time, he starts a reconnaissance mission to observe the locals as part of a preparation for an invasion. He learns about Filipino values and culture in the process. | |
| 2021 | Manila Memories | Renti Bautista | YouTube | Anime-inspired | 5 | The miniseries follows two friends Maya and Jana, who visit Manila's iconic places in the hopes of bringing back Maya's memories. | |
| 2021 | Trese | Budjette Tan; Kajo Baldisimo | Netflix | Anime-inspired | 6 | Set in Manila, where the mythical creatures of Philippine folklore live in hiding amongst humans, Alexandra Trese finds herself going head to head with a criminal underworld consisting of malevolent supernatural beings. | |
| 2021–2022 | Hero City Kids Force | Nono Pardalis | iWantTFC | Flash | 13 | The superheroes and their friends go on missions to battle supervillain Dr. Sternberg, the evil genius responsible for creating monsters that wreak havoc in Hero City, and his sidekick Cyborgana. | |
| 2022 | Mga Kwentong Epik: Ang Alamat ni Maria Makiling | Regene Estolatan | Netflix | Live action; Motion comic | 6 | It focuses on Ria, who goes to find an enigmatic shamanic community in a secluded area in Laguna. In her journey to follow the path of her adoptive mother who used to train with magic, learning the craft eventually leads Ria to discover a truth about herself: she is the goddess Maria Makiling. | |
| 2023 | 333: The Rise of Heroes | PUNX Studios | N/A | Anime-inspired; AI | 7 | The AI series delves into the historical struggles of the Philippines during the Spanish colonization, presenting a compelling narrative. | |
| 2024 | The Filipino Story: Animated Series | Tony Olaes | YouTube | Traditional | 3 | It tells the unifying story of the Filipino people in an entertaining and inspiring way. | |
| TBA | Jobert and the Crop Circle Warriors | Edward L. Tan | N/A | Anime-inspired | 13 | | |
| TBA | Full Mental Populist | Mark Mendoza | YouTube | Traditional | N/A | An animated political satire set in the fictional Southeast Asian nation of Kanau. | |
| TBA | Solemn Vow | Lawrence Panganiban | N/A | Anime-inspired | 13 | A fictional universe of magic and mystical creatures follows super powered spouses, Cef and Lia, who try to fix their marriage after the death of their young son. But their struggles worsen as their mercenary work leads them to a war between two tropical island nations, unleashing a serpent god that may destroy the world. | |
| TBA | Sun Chaser | Bernard Badion; Bobby Pontillas | N/A | Traditional | N/A | A fantasy adventure series where one teen’s summer trip to the Philippines turns into an island-hopping, monster-fighting mythic quest to protect his homeland. | |
