= List of animated television series of the 1980s =

Lists of animated television series first aired in the 1980s organized by year:

- List of animated television series of 1980
- List of animated television series of 1981
- List of animated television series of 1982
- List of animated television series of 1983
- List of animated television series of 1984
- List of animated television series of 1985
- List of animated television series of 1986
- List of animated television series of 1987
- List of animated television series of 1988
- List of animated television series of 1989
