= List of Samurai Pizza Cats episodes =

Samurai Pizza Cats was originally made in Japan by Tatsunoko Pro. as Kyatto Ninden Teyandee. 54 episodes aired from February 1, 1990, to February 12, 1991, on TV Tokyo.

52 episodes were dubbed into English and introduced to western audiences by Saban as Samurai Pizza Cats. Saban did not receive good English translations for the episodes, so the company opted to edit the video and create new stories and dialog. There are significant plot differences between many of the Japanese and English episodes. This list has the English episode descriptions.

== Episodes ==
No. overall	No. in season	Title	Original release date	Additional release dates
1	1	"Stop Dragon My Cat Around!"Secret Ninja Group, Nyankii Dispatch! Transliteration: "Himitsu ninjatai Nyankii shutshudou!" (Japanese: 秘密忍者隊ニャンキー出動!)	February 1, 1990	September 12, 1992 (Canada); September 9, 1996 (United States)
Speedy is serving a pizza to Lucille, but then Guido pops up and steals the pizza to deliver it for Lucille himself. As they continue to reach their destination, they continuously steal the pizza from each other. When Speedy gives it to Lucille, Guido says that Lucille and he are in love, and the two get into a brawl. Lucille stops them by blowing them. Meanwhile, Bad Bird sends out a giant robotic dragon and it wreaks havoc on Little Tokyo. Speedy and Guido notice Ninja Crows inside the Dragon and decide to defeat this machine before it demolishes every structure in the city.
2	2	"If You Knew Sushi Like I Know Sushi"The Town Is Full of Sushi! Panic! Transliteration: "Machijuu osushi da! Panikku da!" (Japanese: 街中おスシだ!パニックだ!)	February 8, 1990	September 19, 1992 (Canada); September 10, 1996 (United States)
Lucille's brother, Wally, is captured by the Ninja Crows and hypnotized into being the driver of a giant sushi-making robot.
3	3	"Underground, Underwater, Undercooked"Dig Dig a Hole and Dig More! Transliteration: "Hore hore ana hore motto hore!" (Japanese: ホレホレ穴掘れもっと掘れ!)	February 15, 1990	September 26, 1992 (Canada); September 11, 1996 (United States)
Bad Bird finds a document which says that gold is hidden beneath the Little Tokyo castle. With the help of Ninja Crows, he manages to hijack the train, with Lucille being one of the passengers. They are ordered to dig to find the gold. Meanwhile, the Pizza Cats realize that Lucille hasn't returned home yet. Speedy suggests that she is aboard that hijacked train, and the Pizza Cats go to the tunnel to find her.
4	4	"The Great Golden Cluck"Have a Worry? A Card Will Solve It! Transliteration: "Nayami o kaiketsu? Kaado de tiin!" (Japanese: 悩みを解決?カードでチーン!)	February 22, 1990	October 3, 1992 (Canada); September 12, 1996 (United States)
A huge golden statue which grants wishes, for a fee, is used by the bad guys as a trojan horse to get into a rich man's house.
5	6	"Singing Samurai Sensai-tion"An Idol is Born? Sweet Trap of the Entertainment World; Transliteration: "Aidoru tanjou? Geinoukai no amai wana" (Japanese: アイドル誕生?芸能界の甘いワナ)	March 1, 1990	October 17, 1992 (Canada); September 13, 1996 (United States)
Polly Esther and Lucille become a hit in Little Tokyo as the singing group The Pointless Sisters. Little do they know that they are really a front for the bad guys' attempt to hypnotize the population.
6	5	"Let the Cellar Beware!"Exploration! Amusement Park for a Tomboy Princess; Transliteration: "Tanken! Otenba hime no yuuenchi" (Japanese: 探検!オテンバ姫の遊園地)	March 8, 1990	October 10, 1992 (Canada); September 16, 1996 (United States)
Princess Vi enlists Speedy to help search for a ghost in the palace.
7	7	"The Nuclear Potato"Is it True!? Karamaru Becomes a Hero? Transliteration: "Maji!? Karamaru ga hiirou ni naru hi?" (Japanese: マジ!?カラ丸がヒーローになる日?)	March 15, 1990	October 24, 1992 (Canada); September 17, 1996 (United States)
Little Tokyo becomes a dump for toxic potato peelings, in exchange for the rich getting richer. Meanwhile, the Big Cheese tries to steal a Nuclear Potato that is on the ship.
8	8	"Kind of a Drag"Is It Dreadful? Koon no Kami's Se-cr-et; Transliteration: "Kowaai? Ko-no-Kami no hi-mi-tsu" (Japanese: こわーい?コーン守のヒ・ミ・ツ)	March 22, 1990	October 31, 1992 (Canada); September 18, 1996 (United States)
Guido meets a pretty girl, but Big Cheese has sent the Ninja Crows after her.
9	9	"Double Trouble for Princess Vi"The Princess is Excited! Everyone is Worried! Transliteration: "Hime wa uki-uki! Minna hara-hara!" (Japanese: 姫はウキウキ!みんなハラハラ!)	March 29, 1990	November 7, 1992 (Canada); September 19, 1996 (United States)
Princess Vi puts on a disguise and sneaks out of the palace to attend the festival as a commoner. The Pizza Cats are sent to protect her.
10	-	"Samurai Pizza Cats: The First 9 Episodes in 30 Minutes"; Transliteration: "Teyandee! Kore ga Nyankii dee" (Japanese: てやんでえ!これがニャンキーでえ)	April 3, 1990	-
A "clip show" with scenes from the first 9 episodes.
11	10	"Hot & Kold Kitties"Father of the Bullied Child is a Gifted Scientist?! Transliteration: "Ijimerarekko no papa wa tensai kagakusha!?" (Japanese: いじめられっ子のパパは天才科学者!?)	April 10, 1990	November 14, 1992 (Canada); September 20, 1996 (United States)
Speedy helps a kid search for his father, the inventor Prof. Ohm, who claims to have invented something to increase the power of any kind of energy. The Big Cheese is holding him hostage to get him to apply his invention to their weather machine.
12	11	"Candid Kitty"Unusual Play, Wonderful Play! The Weakness of Nyankii! Transliteration: "Chin puree kou puree! Nyankii no jakuten!" (Japanese: 珍プレー好プレー!ニャンキーの弱点!)	April 17, 1990	November 21, 1992 (Canada); September 23, 1996 (United States)
The Bad Guys gather in a movie theater to watch their past mistakes and look for the Pizza Cats' weakness.
13	12	"The Pizza Cats Are Only Human (Part One) The Defeat of the Pizza Cats?, The Rude Noise Has Arrived!"Nyankii Defeat? The Dark 4 Ninja Appear! Transliteration: "Nyankii haiboku? Yami no yonninshuu arawaru!" (Japanese: ニャンキー敗北?ヤミの四忍衆あらわる!)	April 24, 1990	November 28, 1992 (Canada); September 24, 1996 (United States)
After discovering the Pizza Cats are solar-powered, the Big Cheese has a satellite launched that will block out the sun. The Pizza Cats try to stop the launch but come up against the Rude Noise.
14	13	"The Pizza Cats Are Only Human (Part Two) Goonie Bird + Pizza Cats = Extra Toppling Mode!"Reversion! Nyankii Fly Through the Air; Transliteration: "Gyakuten! Nyankii sora wo tobu" (Japanese: 逆転!ニャンキー空を飛ぶ)	May 1, 1990	December 5, 1992 (Canada); September 25, 1996 (United States)
The Pizza Cats turn to Guru Lou in hopes that he can help them defeat the Rude Noise.
15	14	"Those Transformin' Felines"Wish! Koon no Kami Wants to Be Popular; Transliteration: "Onegai! Ko-no-Kami wa ninki ga hoshii" (Japanese: お願い!コーン守は人気がほしい)	May 8, 1990	September 26, 1996 (United States)
The Pizza Cats have been getting a big reputation in Little Tokyo. The Big Cheese, now jealous, decides to build his reputation by sending a robot out to attack, but make the Big Cheese look like the hero instead of the Cats.
16	15	"The Case of the Bogus Billionaire"A Lie! The Shogun Is an Imposter!? Transliteration: "Ussou! Shougunsama wa nisemono?" (Japanese: ウッソー!将軍さまはニセモノ!?)	May 15, 1990	September 27, 1996 (United States)
The Big Cheese gets a picture of a potato farmer who looks mysteriously like Emperor Fred. Al Dente then sends the Pizza Cats to find the nanny that raised the Emperor, in hopes that she can identify the true Emperor. However, Big Cheese knows of the plan and sends the Ninja Crows and the Rude Noise to get her first.
17	16	"The Big Cheese's I.Q. Corral"Where? The Professor Disappeared; Transliteration: "Doko da? Kieta daisensei" (Japanese: ドコだ?消えた大先生)	May 22, 1990	September 30, 1996 (United States)
The Big Cheese is having scientists kidnapped to be forced to work on his secret weapon. Now the Ninja Crows are after Guru Lou.
18	17	"Field of Screwballs"Courtship, Courtship a Baseball Challenge; Transliteration: "Miatte miatte yakyuu de shoubu" (Japanese: 見合って見合って野球で勝負)	May 29, 1990	December 12, 1992 (Canada); October 1, 1996 (United States)
The Bad Guys use a mind-controlling robot on a popular baseball player Princess Vi has a crush on. To impress her, they challenge the Pizza Cats to a baseball game.
19	18	"Speedy's Double-Time Trick"Double Date It Is Full of Danger; Transliteration: "W (daburu) deeto wa kiken ga ippai!" (Japanese: Wデートは危険がイッパイ!)	June 5, 1990	December 19, 1992 (Canada); October 2, 1996 (United States)
Speedy makes a date with Lucille, but he forgets that he also made a date with Polly to run some low-level missions. He decides to zip back and forth between his engagements. Between dates, he uncovers the Big Cheese's plan to attack Little Tokyo with a giant Hot Tub robot.
20	19	"Samurai Charm School"Eh!? Pururun's Debutante Declaration; Transliteration: "Eh!? Pururun no ojousama sengen" (Japanese: エッ!?プルルンのお嬢様宣言)	June 12, 1990	December 26, 1992 (Canada); October 3, 1996 (United States)
Polly decides she needs to be less temperamental, so she goes to a model school, which is really a front for the Big Cheese's plan to hire some women warriors.
21	20	"Drumming Up Trouble With A Big Bad Beat"Boom-Boom a Tanuki Makes a Fuss! Transliteration: "Ponpoko tanuki de oosawagi!" (Japanese: ポンポコタヌキで大騒ぎ!)	June 19, 1990	October 4, 1996 (United States)
Big Cheese builds a robot that can bang out a hypnotic drum beat, thus enslaving the town.
22	21	"Pizza Bird Delivers!"A Crow with Pizza, Limited Express Delivery? Transliteration: "Karasu ga piza motte tokkyubin?" (Japanese: カラスがピザ持って特急便?)	June 26, 1990	January 2, 1993 (Canada); October 7, 1996 (United States)
The Big Cheese is short on cash and can no longer afford to pay his minions. As a result, the Ninja Crows have to go find day jobs. Bad Bird takes a job at the Pizza Cat pizzeria. For the first time in his life, Bad Bird knows real satisfaction and is torn between his duty to live up to the evil legacy of his father and his desire to seek his own path to personal happiness. Note:The episode foreshadows events to come in the series finale and Bad Bird and Speedy form a bond of friendship.
23	22	"Big Cheese Shows His Filmy Substance"Crash! Who Is the Star of the Movie? Transliteration: "Gekitotsu! Eiga no shuuyaku dareda?" (Japanese: 激突!映画の主役はだれだ?)	July 3, 1990	January 9, 1993 (Canada); October 8, 1996 (United States)
Princess Vi wants to make a movie, so the Big Cheese, Guido and Speedy run an obstacle course that will determine the male lead.
24	23	"Son of Big Cheese"Strange? Koon no Kami Has a Child!? Transliteration: "Rereh? Ko-no-Kami ni kodomo!?" (Japanese: れれっ?コーン守に子供!?)	July 10, 1990	January 16, 1993 (Canada); October 9, 1996 (United States)
A child becomes attached to the Big Cheese, so Princess Vi orders him to open a diaper-cleaning service. The kid and the cleaning causes delays with his latest giant robot, the Samurai Stomper.
25	24	"Gender Bender Butterflies!"Cute? Yattaro Turns Into a Girl; Transliteration: "Kawaii? Yattarou onna ni naru" (Japanese: かわいい?ヤッ太郎女になる)	July 17, 1990	January 23, 1993 (Canada)
Francine's date with a deer named Bucky is ruined when the Bad Guys release a swarm of butterflies that can make people act like the opposite gender.
26	25	"Cold and Crabby in Little Tokyo"A Big Adventure! Search for the Zekko Bird; Transliteration: "Daibouken! Zekkou chou wo sagase" (Japanese: 大冒険!ゼッコー鳥をさがせ)	July 24, 1990	February 6, 1993 (Canada); October 10, 1996 (United States)
Emperor Fred comes down with a bad cold. Big Al Dente summons the Pizza Cats to go to Mount Coochie to bring back the CooCoo bird, which will restore Emperor Fred's insanity and cure his cold. But the Big Cheese also has a cold and he sends Bad Bird to get the CooCoo bird first.
27	26	"The Terror of Prisoner Island"Unpleasant! We Are Banished to an Island? Transliteration: "Yada! Oiratachi ga shimanagashi?" (Japanese: ヤダ!オイラ達が島流し?)	July 31, 1990	February 13, 1993 (Canada); October 11, 1996 (United States)
There is a flaw in the palace. The Pizza Cats are sent to find the architect, who has been banished to an island by Princess Vi, but the Ninja Crows are after him too.
28	27	"Pizza Cat Performance Review"Is It So? The Nyankii Are Disbanded?! Transliteration: "Heh? Nyankii ga kaisan?!" (Japanese: ヘッ?ニャンキーが解散?!)	August 7, 1990	January 30, 1993 (Canada)
Big Al isn't satisfied with the Pizza Cats' work, so he sends them to the suburbs, while the Rescue Team Cats take over the main shop.
29	28	"Destructo Robots at Popular Prices"Exposed!? Nyankii's True Character; Transliteration: "Bareta?! Nyankii no shoutai" (Japanese: バレた!?ニャンキーの正体)	August 14, 1990	February 20, 1993 (Canada); October 14, 1996 (United States)
The Rude Noise spy on the Pizza Cats to try to find a way to beat them.
30	29	"No Talent Guido"Legendary Idol? Sukashi Dispatched; Transliteration: "Aidoru densetsu? Sukashii no shutsudou" (Japanese: アイドル伝説?スカシー出動)	August 21, 1990	February 27, 1993 (Canada); October 15, 1996 (United States)
Guido feels left out when Speedy, Polly, and even Lucille become music stars. But now it's up to him to save the city from Big Cheese's singing.
31	30	"All You Need is Love"Karamaru in Pain! A Ninja's Love; Transliteration: "Tsuraize Karamaru! Ninja no koi" (Japanese: つらいぜカラ丸!忍者の恋)	August 28, 1990	March 6, 1993 (Canada)
Big Cheese decides to marry his way up, so the Bad Guys make a cupid robot to make Princess Vi fall in love with him, but things don't go as planned.
32	31	"Polly's Magical Flute"Pururun's Flute has a Story; Transliteration: "Pururun no fue wa otogibanashi?!" (Japanese: プルルンの笛はおとぎ話?!)	September 4, 1990	March 13, 1993 (Canada)
Big Cheese discovers a legend about a flute that can be used to find a treasure, so he collects all the flutes in the city, including Polly's.
33	32	"Close Encounters of the Pig Kind"Mysterious?! A Friend from the Stars! Transliteration: "Fushigi?! Hoshi kara kita otomodachi!" (Japanese: ふしぎ?!星から来たお友だち!)	September 11, 1990	March 20, 1993 (Canada); October 16, 1996 (United States)
Speedy befriends a pig from space, but this pig's appetite is out of control.
34	33	"Big Cheese's High Definition TV"A Plan for Certain Victory! The Karakara Clan is Strong; Transliteration: "Hissatsu sakusen! Tsuyoi zo Karakara ichizoku" (Japanese: 必勝作戦!強いぞカラカラ一族)	September 18, 1990	March 27, 1993 (Canada)
After reviewing their previous encounters with the Pizza Cats, the Big Cheese decides to combine the features from previous robots into one.
35	34	"Pizza Delivery of Doom!"Sagase! Nekkii Disappeared at the Lake; Transliteration: "Sagase! Mizu-umi ni kieta Nekkii" (Japanese: さがせ!湖に消えたネッキー)	September 25, 1990	April 6, 1993 (Canada); October 17, 1996 (United States)
Spritz disappears while making a delivery to a lakeside village, where mysterious creatures have been frightening the locals.
36	35	"Youth Is for Exploding"Youth Burn with Passion! Also, the Professor returns. Transliteration: "Moyase seishun! Mata deta daisensei" (Japanese: もやせ青春!また出た大先生)	October 2, 1990	April 10, 1993 (Canada); October 18, 1996 (United States)
The city is in terrorized by a group of exploding robot teens. And to make things worse, Guru Lou is testing his new formula.
37	36	"Bad Bird Uncaged (Part One) We'll Fight At Sundown!"Really!? Yattaro Dies at Sundown; Transliteration: "Masaka?! Yattarou yuuhi ni shisu" (Japanese: まさか?!ヤッ太郎夕日に死す)	October 9, 1990	April 17, 1993 (Canada); October 21, 1996 (United States)
Bad Bird is back with powerful new weapons, and challenges Speedy to a battle. Can Speedy defeat him?
38	37	"Bad Bird Uncaged (Part Two) Speedy's Comeback or: How I learned to stop Worrying and trust Guru Lou"Defeat Karamaru! Tears, Tears of a Big Revival; Transliteration: "Taose Karamaru! Namida, namida no daifukkatsu" (Japanese: たおせカラ丸!涙, 涙の大復活)	October 16, 1990	April 24, 1993 (Canada); October 22, 1996 (United States)
Speedy goes to Guru Lou to learn the secret of the Pizza Cats' power.
39	38	"A Mission in Manhattan"Hello! Yattaro Flies to Another Country; Transliteration: "Haroo! Yattarou kaigai he tobu" (Japanese: ハロー!ヤッ太郎海外へ飛ぶ)	October 23, 1990	May 1, 1993 (Canada)
The Pizza Cats travel to meet the New York Pizza Cats. The Big Cheese also goes to New York for a crime conference.
40	39	"Unidentified Flying Oddballs"UFO!? Nyankii vs Aliens; Transliteration: "UFO? Nyankii tai uchuujin" (Japanese: UFO!?ニャンキー対宇宙人)	October 30, 1990	May 8, 1993 (Canada); October 23, 1996 (United States)
A flying saucer appears, and kidnaps Princess Vi. The Pizza Cats have to rescue her.
41	40	"Princess Vi's Hippy-Dippy Mom"Touching! Mother Returns Home; Transliteration: "Tonderu! Kaette kita hahaue" (Japanese: とんでる!帰ってきた母上)	November 6, 1990	May 15, 1993 (Canada); October 24, 1996 (United States)
Princess Vi's mother returns, and gives Vi a gem that the Big Cheese needs for his latest robot.
42	41	"A Wet & Wild Weekend"A Big, Confusing Fight at the Spa? Transliteration: "Tairansen de ii yu dana!?" (Japanese: 大乱戦でいい湯だな!?)	November 13, 1990	May 22, 1993 (Canada); October 25, 1996 (United States)
The Pizza Cats go to a spa to protect Emperor Fred and Princess Vi, but Big Cheese and the Ninja Crows are there too, trying to get some rest and relaxation.
43	42	"Kung Fu Kitty Kontest"Everyone is Coming! A Contest to Decide Who Is #1 in the Land; Transliteration: "Zen-in shutsugou! Tenka no daishiai" (Japanese: 全員集合!天下一の大試合)	November 20, 1990	May 29, 1993 (Canada)
Princess Vi holds a martial arts fighting contest to see who is the top fighter in the city. The Pizza Cats, Lucille, Bad Bird and one of Big Cheese's robots are among the entrants into battle.
44	43	"Gone with the Ginzu"Pinch! The Masamasa is Stolen; Transliteration: "Pinchi! Nusumareta Masamasa" (Japanese: ピンチ!盗まれたマサマサ)	November 27, 1990	June 5, 1993 (Canada)
The bad guys steal the Speedy's magical Ginzu Sword and make a copy of it.
45	44	"A Little Bit 'O Luck"Disappointment! The Misery of Koon no Kami; Transliteration: "Gakuh! Mijime na Ko-no-Kami" (Japanese: ガクッ!みじめなコーン守)	December 4, 1990	June 12, 1993 (Canada)
Jerry and Bad Bird builds a robot that brings luck. It was supposed to be delivered to Big Cheese, but was lost to Speedy instead. While trying to get the robot back, they give the Bad Luck robot to the Big Cheese.
46	45	"Samurai Savings Time"Nyankii are Stuck in Time; Transliteration: "Toki wo kakeru Nyankii" (Japanese: 時をかけるニャンキー!)	December 11, 1990	June 19, 1993 (Canada); October 28, 1996 (United States)
The Big Cheese builds a robot that can travel through time. His plan is to travel back in time to stop the Pizza Cats from being formed. Unbeknownst to him, the Pizza Cats are on their way to the palace to celebrate the anniversary of their formation. Big Cheese, Bad Bird, and the Cats accidentally get sent back in time with the robot and the Cats try to stop Big Cheese from meeting up with Jerry Atric and the Ninja Crows.
47	46	"Phoney Baloney Cat"They Appeared! Imitation Nyankii; Transliteration: "Deta! Nise Nyankii" (Japanese: 出た!にせニャンキー)	December 18, 1990	June 26, 1993 (Canada); October 29, 1996 (United States)
Big Cheese, Jerry, and Bad Bird dress up like the Pizza Cats to ruin the cats' reputations.
48	47	"The Cheese Who Stole Christmas"Nyankii Santas Fly Through the Air; Transliteration: "Nyankii santa sora wo yuku" (Japanese: ニャンキーサンタ空を行く)	December 25, 1990	December 25, 1993 (Canada)
Big Cheese is having a bad Christmas, so he dress up like Santa and gives kids masks that won't come off.
49	48	"Emperor Fred Does Hard Time"Tired Yattaro is Banished to an Island; Transliteration: "Yattarou otsukare shimanagashi" (Japanese: ヤッ太郎おつかれ島流し)	January 8, 1991	July 3, 1993 (Canada); October 30, 1996 (United States)
Speedy gives Princess Vi's pizza to Emperor Fred, who ruins it. The Princess has a temper tantrum and banishes both of them.
50	49	"Quake, Rattle & Roll"Gennarisai's "WAHAHA" Big Plan! Transliteration: "Gennarisai no wahaha daisakusen!" (Japanese: 幻ナリ斎のワハハ大作戦!)	January 15, 1991	July 10, 1993 (Canada)
The Ninja Crows build an earthquake-creating robot, which terrifies Speedy and Big Cheese.
51	-	"The Very Best of Big Cheese's Failures"; Transliteration: "Kiih! Ko-no-Kami no daikenkyuu" (Japanese: きーっ!コーン守の大研究)	January 22, 1991	-
Clip Show
52	50	"The Big Comet Caper (Part One) Big Cheese's Biggest Plan Ever!"Koon no Kami's Biggest Operation Ever! Transliteration: "Ko-no-Kami shijou saidai no sakusen!" (Japanese: コーン守史上最大の作戦!)	January 29, 1991	July 17, 1993 (Canada); October 31, 1996 (United States)
In a last desperate act, the Big Cheese diverts a comet towards Little Tokyo and blackmails the city. Can the Pizza Cats stop the Big Cheese before he destroys Little Tokyo...?
53	51	"The Big Comet Caper (Part Two) The Absolute Beauty of Tomorrow!"Tomorrow will be Absolute Beautiful! Transliteration: "Ashita mo zettai nihonbare!" (Japanese: 明日もぜったい日本晴れ!)	February 5, 1991	July 24, 1993 (Canada); November 1, 1996 (United States)
Speedy and Bad Bird join forces to save the world from the comet.
54	52	"The Cats Cop Cartoon Careers!/ Pizza Cats 4EVAH! (True²)"Nyankii is Forever! Transliteration: "Nyankii wa fumetsu desu!" (Japanese: ニャンキーは不滅です!)	February 12, 1991	July 31, 1993 (Canada)
A look back at some of the characters' best moments in the series.
