= List of animated television series of 1970 =

A list of animated television series first aired in 1970.

Animated television series first aired in 1970
Title	Episodes	Country	Year	Notes	Technique
The Adventures of Hutch the Honeybee	91	Japan	1970–71		Anime
The Adventures of Parsley	32	United Kingdom	1970–71		Stop-Motion
Akakichi no Eleven	52	Japan	1970–71		Anime
Ashita no Joe	79	Japan	1970–71		Anime
Bakuhatsu Gorô	26	Japan	1970		Anime
Dôbutsu Mura Monogatari	100	Japan	1970		Anime
Doctor Dolittle	17	United States	1970–71		Traditional
Famous Classic Tales	31	United States; Australia	1970–84		Traditional
Groovie Goolies	16	United States	1970–72		Traditional
Harlem Globetrotters	22	United States	1970–71		Traditional
Ijiwaru Bā-san	39	Japan	1970–71		Anime
Inakappe Taishō	104	Japan	1970–72		Anime
Itazura Tenshi Chippo-Chan	240	Japan	1970		Anime
Josie and the Pussycats	32	United States	1970–72		Traditional
Kick no Oni	26	Japan	1970–71		Anime
Mahō no Mako-chan	48	Japan	1970–71		Anime
Manga Jinbutsushi	365	Japan	1970–71		Anime
Nihon Tanjô	5	Japan	1970		Anime
Norakuro	26	Japan	1970–71		Anime
Otanoshimi Anime Gekijô	26	Japan	1970		Anime
Otoko Do Ahô! Kôshien	12	Japan	1970–71		Anime
The Reluctant Dragon & Mr. Toad Show	17	United States (production); Canada (voice actors); Japan (animated)	1970–71		Traditional
Sabrina and the Groovie Goolies	31	United States	1970–74	Package series	Traditional
The Tomfoolery Show	17	United States; United Kingdom	1970–71		Traditional
Warera Salary man Dô	26	Japan	1970–71		Anime
Where's Huddles?	10	United States	1970		Traditional
Will the Real Jerry Lewis Please Sit Down	18	United States	1970–71		Traditional

== See also ==
- List of animated feature films of 1970
- List of Japanese animation television series of 1970
