= List of Chibi Maruko-chan episodes =

This is a list of episodes from the anime series Chibi Maruko-chan.

The first series run ran from January 7, 1990, to September 27, 1992, airing a total of 142 episodes, one opening theme, and two ending themes.

The second run began on January 8, 1995, and is still currently airing today. 1495 episodes have aired as of August 31st, 2025.

== Series 1 (1990–1992) ==
=== 1990 ===
No.	Title	Original release date
1	"Maru-chan's Sibling Rivalry!" (Japanese: まるちゃんきょうだいげんかをする)	January 7, 1990
1	"Maru-chan's in the New Year Mood!" (Japanese: まるちゃんはまだおとそ気分)	January 7, 1990
Tensions rise between Maruko and Sakiko when a new notebook enters the picture. Then, Maruko's peaceful New Year is threatened by responsiblities looming over the horizon.
2	"Here Comes the Tutor!" (Japanese: 家庭教師がやってきた)	January 14, 1990
2	"Maru-chan buys an Alarm Clock!" (Japanese: まるちゃん目覚まし時計を買う)	January 14, 1990
Sakiko gets a tutor that doesn't meet Maruko's exacting standards. Then, sick of being late for class, Maruko decides to buy an alarm clock.
3	"Today is Sensei's Home Visit!" (Japanese: 今日は家庭訪問)	January 21, 1990
3	"Let's Meet the Pretentious Kid!" (Japanese: 生き物係のキザ野郎参上)	January 21, 1990
While Maruko hopes this year's home visit from her sensei will go smoothly, her capacity for self-sabotage has other ideas. Then, Maruko's hopes for an easy role in class are dashed when she finds out she's paired with the pretentious go-getter Hanawa.
4	"Maru-chan Learns to Ride a Bike!" (Japanese: まるちゃん自転車の練習をする)	January 28, 1990
When all the kids her age become obsessed with riding bicycles, Maruko has no choice but to suffer the trials and tribulations of learning how to ride one.
5	"Maru-chan Gets a Certificate!" (Japanese: まるちゃん賞状をもらう)	February 4, 1990
5	"Maru-chan Catches a Cold!" (Japanese: まるちゃんカゼをひく)	February 4, 1990
Maruko is thrilled to be getting a certificate for her submission to an art contest, but complications arise by the time she has to actually go on stage. Then, Maruko's hubris gets the better of her when she's allowed to stay home from school after she catches a cold.
6	"Maru-chan And Friends Find a Puppy!" (Japanese: まるちゃんたち犬をひろう)	February 11, 1990
Maruko and Tama-chan find a stray puppy and begin keeping her in a cardboard box behind the school while they try to find a home for her.
7	"My Family Eats French Cuisine!" (Japanese: みんなでフランス料理を食べに行く)	February 18, 1990
7	"Maru-chan Hates Marathons!" (Japanese: まるちゃんはマラソンがイヤ)	February 18, 1990
Maruko's family heads to a French restaurant to broaden their palettes, but nobody is quite ready for what they'll encounter there. Then, the dreaded school marathon has finally arrived, much to Maruko's chagrin.
8	"The Valentine's Day of Sadness" (Japanese: 悲しきバレンタインデー)	February 25, 1990
8	"Hanawa Enters a Singing Contest" (Japanese: 花輪君子供歌合戦に出場する)	February 25, 1990
It's Valentine's Day, and Maruko struggles with the decision of who she should give chocolate to. Then, Maruko goes to cheer on Hanawa when he's scheduled to make an appearance on a televised singing contest.
9	"Maru-chan Practises the Recorder!" (Japanese: まるちゃん笛の練習をする)	March 4, 1990
9	"I Want To Eat Snow!" (Japanese: 雪を食べたい)	March 4, 1990
Maruko struggles to learn the recorder before an upcoming test. Then, Maruko reminisces about her first trip to snow country.
10	"Maru-chan Visits Faraway Relatives!" (Japanese: まるちゃん遠くのしんせきの家に行く)	March 11, 1990
After a lecture from her mother about how she's wasting her spring break, Maruko decides to take a trip by herself to visit her grandparents in the next town over.
11	"A Citizen's Devotion to Disaster Drills!" (Japanese: 避難訓練に余念のない県民)	March 18, 1990
11	"Maru-chan Gets Her Report Card!" (Japanese: まるちゃん通信簿をもらう)	March 18, 1990
Maruko's school puts their earthquake-readiness to the test with a disaster drill. Then, Maruko contemplates what she should ask for as a reward for getting a good report card, without actually knowing if her report card deserves one.
12	"The Legendary Tsuchinoko Company Limited!" (Japanese: まぼろしの“ツチノコ株式会社”)	March 25, 1990
12	"Maru-chan Likes Preparing for Field Trips!" (Japanese: まるちゃんは遠足の準備が好き)	March 25, 1990
Maruko and her friends try to strike it rich by hunting a legendary snake. Then, Maruko is overjoyed about an upcoming field trip, but it's for reasons that no one would ever expect.
13	"Maru-chan Goes on a Field Trip!" (Japanese: まるちゃん遠足に行く)	April 1, 1990
Maruko goes on the field trip she was preparing for in the last episode.
14	"The Yearned-For Nosebleed!" (Japanese: あこがれの鼻血)	April 8, 1990
14	"Home Alone With Sakiko!" (Japanese: ふたりだけの留守番)	April 8, 1990
When she notices the sympathy they elicit from others, Maruko starts longing for a nosebleed of her own. Then, Maruko and Sakiko are stuck watching the house while their mother goes shopping.
15	"Finally! Maruo and the Class Election!" (Japanese: 丸尾君学級委員選挙いよいよ出馬)	April 15, 1990
16	"Maru-chan Gets Appendicitis!" (Japanese: 「まるちゃん盲腸になる」の巻)	April 22, 1990
16	"Maru-chan Gets Her Fortune Told!" (Japanese: まるちゃん占いをされる)	April 22, 1990
Maruko is stuck between a rock and a hard place when absolutely no one in her family believes that she has excruciating stomach pain. Then, Maruko gets swept away by everyone else's fortune-telling fever.
17	"Maru-chan Really Wants a Bird!" (Japanese: まるちゃん小鳥がほしくなる)	April 29, 1990
17	"Maru-chan Has a Birthday Party!" (Japanese: まるちゃんお誕生会を開く)	April 29, 1990
Maruko has sparrow fever and begs her parents non-stop to buy one for her. Then, Maruko's dreams of a grand birthday party are dashed when her mother exercises her executive authority over the guest list.
18	"Mom's Treasure!" (Japanese: おかあさんの宝物)	May 6, 1990
18	"Maru-chan's Late Night Feast!" (Japanese: まるちゃん深夜の宴会)	May 6, 1990
Maruko accidentally loses her mother's valuable opal ring. Then, entranced by classmate's tales of waking up during the night to find adults eating delicious treats, Maruko vows to catch her parents in the act one night as well.
19	"Mother's Day!" (Japanese: おかあさんの日)	May 13, 1990
Swept away on Mother's Day sentiments, Maruko wants nothing more than to make the day a special one for her mother, even with her limited budget.
20	"The Boy from the Orient in May!" (Japanese: 5月のオリエンタル小僧)	May 20, 1990
20	"The Parental Visit of Melancholy!" (Japanese: ゆううつな参観日)	May 20, 1990
A boy of unknown heritage causes a stir when he transfers into Maruko's class, much to his chagrin. Then, Maruko's mother insists on attending her class's parental visit, much to Maruko's chagrin.
21	"Maru-chan and the School Arts Festival!" (Japanese: まるちゃん学芸会に出る)	May 27, 1990
Maruko ends up with a lead role in the class play, much to her chagrin.
22	"Maru-chan Gets Pen Pals!" (Japanese: まるちゃん文通をはじめる)	June 3, 1990
22	"I Love Free Study Time" (Japanese: 自習時間大好き)	June 3, 1990
Maruko tries keeping up correspondence with two pen pals from across the country, hoping beyond hope that they'll send some presents her way. Then, Maruko catches a lucky break when her sensei calls in sick on a day when she's forgotten to do her homework.
23	"Maru-chan's Town Gets Flooded!" (Japanese: まるちゃんの町は大洪水)	June 10, 1990
After her town gets flooded, Maruko goes to gawk at the aftermath and then help clean up her classroom.
24	"Maru-chan's Tooth Hurts!" (Japanese: まるちゃん虫歯が痛い)	June 17, 1990
24	"Ah! The Physical Examination!" (Japanese: ああ身体検査)	June 17, 1990
25	"The Stomachache at School!" (Japanese: まるちゃん学校でお腹が痛くなる)	June 24, 1990
26	"Pool's Open" (Japanese: プールびらき)	July 1, 1990
27	"The Tanabata Wish!" (Japanese: 七夕の願い事)	July 8, 1990
28	"Maru-chan Gets a New Umbrella!" (Japanese: まるちゃん傘を買ってもらう)	July 15, 1990
28	"Maru-chan's Summer Memories!" (Japanese: まるちゃんの夏の思い出)	July 15, 1990
Overjoyed with her new umbrella, Maruko starts bringing it to school everyday which leads to teasing from her classmates. Then, Maruko remembers a time in kindergarten when she refused to go in to the class pool.
29	"Maru-chan's Bathtub Is Broken!" (Japanese: まるちゃんの家のお風呂がこわれた)	July 22, 1990
29	"The Old Man's Magic Cards!" (Japanese: おっちゃんの魔法カード)	July 22, 1990
Maruko becomes enamored with the public bath when the bathtub breaks in the Sakura family household. Then, in an adaptation of the very first chapter of the manga, Maruko and her sister try to scrounge up money to buy a set of magic cards from a shady character.
30	"Maru-chan Goes to School During Summer Break!" (Japanese: まるちゃんは夏休みも学校へ通う)	July 29, 1990
Maruko's plans for a lazy summer are interrupted when she's forced to come to the school to take care of the class rabbits for a week.
31	"Maru-chan Goes to the South-Island! (Part 1)" (Japanese: まるちゃん南の島へ行く (前編))	August 5, 1990
When Grandpa wins a trip to the South Island in Thailand, Maruko is the only family member able to go.
32	"Maru-chan Goes to the South-Island! (Part 2)" (Japanese: まるちゃん南の島へ行く (後編))	August 12, 1990
On her grand trip to the South Island, Maruko befriends the daughter of the resort manager and goes on a bunch of amazing adventures.
33	"Maru-chan Goes to a Haunted House" (Japanese: まるちゃんお化け屋敷に行く)	August 19, 1990
Maru-chan boldly asserts her desire to go to a haunted house attraction hosted at a nearby department store, but when her father takes her, she realizes she bit off more than she can chew.
34	"Maru-chan Didn't Finish Her Homework!" (Japanese: 宿題をためたまる子ちゃん)	August 26, 1990
A lazy summer vacation catches up to Maruko when she's forced to finish an entire summer vacation's worth of homework in a single day.a
35	"Maru-chan Goes to a Photographer!" (Japanese: まるちゃん写真屋さんに行く)	September 2, 1990
35	"What Happened on a Stormy Night" (Japanese: 嵐の夜の出来事)	September 2, 1990
After she kicks up a fuss when she realizes her photo album is much more sparse than her sister's, Maruko is off to a professional photographer. Then, Maruko faces a comedy of errors on a stormy night when she attempts to hide a failed test.
36	"Maru-chan Gets Tropical Fish!" (Japanese: まるちゃん熱帯魚を買う)	September 9, 1990
Maruko's tropical fish fantasies come true when Sakiko receives some guppies from one of her friends.
37	"The Bobbed-Haired Kappa" (Japanese: おかっぱ・かっぱ)	September 16, 1990
38	"Maru-chan Goes Hiking" (Japanese: まるちゃんハイキングに行く)	September 23, 1990
39	"Maru-chan Finds Money" (Japanese: まるちゃんお金を見つける)	September 30, 1990
40	"The Great Boy vs. Girl War" (Japanese: 男子対女子大戦争)	October 7, 1990
41	"Maru-chan Changes Her Desk" (Japanese: まるちゃん席替えをする)	October 14, 1990
41	"Maru-chan Goes to a Bar" (Japanese: まるちゃん飲み屋さんに行く)	October 14, 1990
42	"Maru-chan Loses Her Celebrity Photo"	October 21, 1990
43	"Maru-chan Experiments" (Japanese: まるちゃん実験をする)	October 28, 1990
44	"Maru-chan's "Wish Upon a Star"" (Japanese: まるちゃんの“星に願いを”)	November 4, 1990
45	"Cousin's Shichigosan" (Japanese: いとこの七五三)	November 11, 1990
46	"Cleaning the Scary Chicken Coop" (Japanese: 恐怖のにわとり小屋そうじ)	November 18, 1990
46	"A Sunday on My Own" (Japanese: 一人っきりの日曜日)	November 18, 1990
47	"Mom and Dad Have an Argument" (Japanese: お父さんとお母さん けんかする)	November 25, 1990
48	"Maru-chan Wants Her Own Room" (Japanese: まるちゃん自分の部屋が欲しくなる)	December 2, 1990
49	"Maru-chan Writes a New Years Card" (Japanese: まるちゃん年賀状を書く)	December 9, 1990
50	"The Family is Poor" (Japanese: うちはびんぼう)	December 16, 1990
51	"Maru-chan Attends a Christmas Party" (Japanese: まるちゃんクリスマス会に参加する)	December 23, 1990
52	"Happy New Year Maruko-chan" (Japanese: 年越し まる子ちゃん)	December 30, 1990

=== 1991 ===
No.	Title	Original release date
53	"An Ordinary New Year's Day" (Japanese: いつものお正月)	January 6, 1991
54	"Maru-chan's Sleepless Night" (Japanese: まるちゃん 眠れない夜)	January 13, 1991
55	"Children Are Like the Wind" (Japanese: 子供は風の子)	January 20, 1991
56	"Maru-chan's Happy Day" (Japanese: まるちゃん ご機嫌な一日)	January 27, 1991
57	"Maruko Wards Off an Oni" (Japanese: まる子 豆まきをする)	February 3, 1991
58	"Maru-chan Gets Lost in the Department Store" (Japanese: まるちゃんデパートで迷子になる)	February 10, 1991
59	"Maru-chan's Balloon Story" (Japanese: まるちゃんの風船物語)	February 17, 1991
60	"The Yearned-for Class Closure!" (Japanese: 憧れの学級閉鎖)	February 24, 1991
61	"Maru-chan's Hinamatsuri!" (Japanese: まるちゃんおひな祭りに呼ばれる)	March 3, 1991
62	"Sounds Like a Whistle" (Japanese: 口笛が聞こえる)	March 10, 1991
63	"The After-School Class Assembly" (Japanese: 放課後の学級会)	March 17, 1991
64	"Maru-chan's Hydroponics" (Japanese: まるちゃんの水栽培)	March 24, 1991
65	"Maru-chan Goes to a Health Club" (Japanese: まるちゃんヘルスセンターに行く)	March 31, 1991
66	"Maru-chan Goes Cherry Blossom Viewing" (Japanese: まるちゃん お花見に行く)	April 7, 1991
67	"Maruko's Group Takes Care of the First-Years" (Japanese: まる子達 一年生の世話をやく)	April 14, 1991
68	"Maru-chan Writes an Essay!"	April 21, 1991
69	"Maruko Worries About a Nostradamus Prediction" (Japanese: まる子ノストラダムスの予言を気にする)	April 28, 1991
70	"Maruko's Children Day!" (Japanese: まるちゃん 子供の日)	May 5, 1991
71	"Grandpa's a Contestant on Belt Quiz (Part 1)" (Japanese: おじいちゃんベルトクイズに出る (前編))	May 12, 1991
72	"Grandpa's a Contestant on Belt Quiz (Part 2)" (Japanese: おじいちゃんベルトクイズに出る (後編))	May 19, 1991
73	"Maruko Visits the Planetarium" (Japanese: まる子 プラネタリウムに行く)	May 26, 1991
74	"Maru-chan Starts a Class Newspaper" (Japanese: まるちゃん 学級新聞を作る)	June 2, 1991
75	"Detective Maruko!" (Japanese: まるちゃんは名探偵)	June 9, 1991
76	"Maruko Wants to be a Prima Donna!" (Japanese: まる子プリマドンナに憧れる)	June 16, 1991
76	"Maruko Can't Stop Scratching Her Ears!" (Japanese: まる子 耳かきぐせが直らない)	June 16, 1991
77	"Maruko Goes to Momoe-chan's Concert!"	June 23, 1991
78	"Maru-chan Goes to a Wedding" (Japanese: まるちゃん 結婚式に出席する)	June 30, 1991
79	"Maru-chan's Tanabata Movie Club" (Japanese: まるちゃんの七夕映画会)	July 7, 1991
79	"How to Spend 270,000 Yen" (Japanese: 賞金27万円の使い道)	July 7, 1991
80	"Maru-chan Gets a Blazer!" (Japanese: まる子 洋服を作ってもらう)	July 14, 1991
80	"Maruko Makes Shaved Ice!" (Japanese: まる子 かき氷を作る)	July 14, 1991
81	"Maruko and the Mysterious Mansion" (Japanese: まる子まぼろしの洋館を見る)	July 28, 1991
82	"Maru-chan Goes on a Sleepover" (Japanese: まるちゃんお泊まりに行く)	August 4, 1991
83	"Maru-chan Despises Radio Calisthenics" (Japanese: まるちゃんラジオ体操がイヤで仕方無い)	August 11, 1991
84	"Maruko is Envious of Twins" (Japanese: まる子双子がうらやましい)	August 18, 1991
85	"Maruko Cleans the Shrine" (Japanese: まる子 神社の大掃除をする)	August 25, 1991
85	"Maruko’s Forgotten Weather Report!" (Japanese: まる子 夏休みのお天気調べを忘れる)	August 25, 1991
86	"The South Island Souvenir Shuffle!" (Japanese: まる子 南の島のおみやげ分配に困る)	September 1, 1991
87	"Maruko and Hamaji, Sitting in a Tree!" (Japanese: まる子 はまじとウワサになる)	September 8, 1991
88	"Grandpa's Round-the-World Trip" (Japanese: おじいちゃんの世界一周)	September 15, 1991
89	"Maruko Goes to an Amusement Park" (Japanese: まる子 遊園地に行く)	September 22, 1991
Maruko's father is forced to suffer as chaperone when Maruko and her sister beg to go on a theme park trip put together by their neighborhood organization.
90	"The Household Cultural Classroom!" (Japanese: 家庭内カルチャー教室)	September 29, 1991
When Maruko finds out most of the kids in her class have after-school activities, she starts longing for an after-school activity of her own. In response, Maruko's parents attempt to pass on some of their skills, with less-than-stellar results.
91	"Maru-chan Goes on a Field Trip!" (Japanese: まるちゃん 社会科見学に行く)	October 6, 1991
Maruko's dreams come true when she finds out the destination for her class field trip is a candy factory.
92	"Maruko Eats Matsutake Mushrooms" (Japanese: まる子 松茸を食べる)	October 13, 1991
92	"Maruko Wants a Bubblebath" (Japanese: まる子 泡風呂に憧れる)	October 13, 1991
Maruko gets a chance to try a renowned Japanese delicacy, but finds herself underwhelmed. Then, Hanawa sells Maruko on the concept of a bubble bath, but she finds it's easier said than done when it comes to having one in a Japanese household bathtub.
93	"The Longed-For Lunch Menu Meeting!" (Japanese: お楽しみ給食会)	October 20, 1991
Maruko's class gets the honor of planning the lunch menu for a day.
94	"Watch Out for Kidnappers!" (Japanese: 誘拐犯に気をつけろ)	October 27, 1991
95	"Dad Borrows an 8mm Camera!" (Japanese: お父さん8ミリカメラを借りてくる)	November 3, 1991
In order to record the family's daily life for posterity, Maruko's father borrows an 8mm camera. Whether or not he can film anything of value is another matter, especially when two unwanted guests show up.
96	"Maruko Goes to a Festival!" (Japanese: まる子 お祭りに行く)	November 10, 1991
96	"Girls and Boys!" (Japanese: 女の子・男の子)	November 10, 1991
Maruko goes to a local festival with her grandfather. Then, a series of events leads Maruko to argue with her father about who rules and who drools when it comes to girls and boys.
97	"Everyone’s Picking on Maruko!" (Japanese: まる子みんなにばかにされる)	November 17, 1991
Maruko's reach exceeds her grasp when she decides to devote herself to living up to the standards set by some of the most respected people of all time.
98	"Maruko Goes Picking Mikans" (Japanese: まる子 みかん狩りに行く)	November 24, 1991
A fun field trip is in store when Maruko's sensei takes her class to go pick mikans.
99	"The School Bazaar!" (Japanese: 学校のバザー)	December 1, 1991
The school holds its annual bazaar, and Maruko's family uses this opportunity to donate their old junk and clean out the house.
100	"Finally, We Go to Hanawa’s House!" (Japanese: 花輪邸ついに公開)	December 8, 1991
Overcome with curiosity, Maruko and her friends invite themselves over to Hanawa's house to see how the other half lives.
101	"Hanawa’s Friend Returns Home" (Japanese: 花輪クンちに来た友人帰る)	December 15, 1991
After a fun winter break spent getting to know Hanawa's friend Mark, it's time for him to head back to New York. Maruko learns that despite all his wealth, there are still some things that Hanawa lacks.
102	"Christmas at Home!" (Japanese: 家庭内クリスマス)	December 22, 1991
Maruko and her family prepare for another Christmas at home, but the festivities turn out to not be Christmas-y enough for Maruko's tastes.
103	"The Homemade Detergent!" (Japanese: 自家製洗濯石鹸)	December 29, 1991
103	"Mom Makes Candied Sweetfish!" (Japanese: お母さん鮎の甘露煮を作る)	December 29, 1991
Maruko's mother gives a recipe for homemade laundry detergent a try. Then, a solution is found for an abundance of unpleasant-tasting sweetfish caught by Maruko's father, but the result might be too tasty for its own good.

=== 1992 ===
No.	Title	Original release date
104	"Maruko Go Flies a Kite!" (Japanese: まる子 凧上げをする)	January 5, 1992
104	"Maruko Wants to Eat New Year's Porridge!" (Japanese: まる子 七草がゆが食べたい)	January 5, 1992
Maruko wants a kite of her own to fly for New Year's. Then, Maruko becomes obsessed with tracking down all the ingredients necessary to make good and proper New Year's porridge.
105	"Maruko's Bank Book!" (Japanese: まる子の貯金通帳)	January 12, 1992
105	"Maruko Tries Knitting!" (Japanese: まる子 編み物をする)	January 12, 1992
Maruko catches her mother off guard by insisting on evidence that the money she had given up for safekeeping was indeed deposited into a bank account. Then, a class-wide knitting craze inspires Maruko to take up the hobby herself.
106	"Maruko Wants a Hot Water Bottle!" (Japanese: まる子 湯たんぽを欲しがる)	January 19, 1992
Fed up with chilly nights, Maruko decides to start sleeping under the kotatsu whenever she can, much to her mother's chagrin.
107	"The School's Skating Class!" (Japanese: 学校のスケート教室)	January 26, 1992
Maruko's school is going to spend a day at the skating rink, but there's just one problem -- Maruko doesn't know how to skate.
108	"Here Comes the Snake Shop!" (Japanese: 町にへび屋がやって来た)	February 2, 1992
108	"Maruko Can’t Stop Drinking Amazake!" (Japanese: まる子 甘酒ばかり飲む)	February 2, 1992
Some travelling snake handlers pass through town and put on a demonstration of the numerous snakes in their care, which thrills Maruko to no end. Then, Maruko discovers that you can actually get too much of a good thing when she starts gorging herself on amazake, a low-alcohol sweet drink made from the byproducts of sake production.
109	"Midori-chan’s Valentine’s Day!" (Japanese: みどりちゃんのバレンタインデー)	February 9, 1992
Maruko finds herself in the unlikely role of Cupid when Midori begs her for her help in landing Fujiki's heart
110	"Maruko Wants Some Star Sand" (Japanese: まる子星の砂が欲しい)	February 16, 1992
110	"Maruko Feeds the Sparrows" (Japanese: まる子 雀の餌づけをする)	February 16, 1992
Maruko becomes enamored with star sand, but she's going to need to break the bank if she wants to get her hands on some. Then, Maruko gets struck with bird fever again, and decides to capture a sparrow.
111	"Miyako Has a Baby!" (Japanese: みやこお姉ちゃんの赤ちゃん)	February 23, 1992
Maruko's cousin Miyako gives birth, and Maruko has conflicting emotions over Miyako moving on to a new stage in her life.
112	"Let’s Go to Sensei’s House!" (Japanese: 先生の家に遊びに行こう)	March 1, 1992
After developing an interest in what the home life of their sensei must be like, Maruko and her classmates plan a trip to visit him at his home.
113	"Maruko is Chased by Stray Dogs!" (Japanese: まる子ノラ犬に追いかけられる)	March 8, 1992
Stray dogs start prowling around Maruko's neighborhood, and they end up setting their sights on her.
114	"Hanawa and Maruo" (Japanese: 丸尾君と花輪君)	March 15, 1992
114	"Termites? In My House?" (Japanese: 我が家に白アリが!)	March 15, 1992
Hanawa's rise in popularity puts Maruo's position as class representative at risk... at least, that's what Maruo thinks. Then, Maruko's family deals with a termite infestation in their bathroom wall.
115	"Maruko Helps Release Koi" (Japanese: まる子 鯉の放流に参加する)	March 22, 1992
115	"The Hay Fever Hootenanny" (Japanese: 花粉症騒動)	March 22, 1992
Maruko hopes the releasing of a large bunch of koi into a Shimizu river will put Shimizu on the map. Then, Maruko learns what hay fever is when Grandpa and a bunch of other people start sneezing uncontrollably.
116	"Nagasawa’s Home Burns Down" (Japanese: 永沢君の家、火事になる)	March 29, 1992
When Nagasawa loses his home because of a fire, Maruko and her classmates attempt to reach out to him in the most awkward way possible.
117	"A Sympathy Visit for Nagasawa" (Japanese: 永沢君ちの火事見舞い)	April 5, 1992
In the aftermath of Nagasawa's house burning down, Maruko and her friends reach out to him in his hour of need.
118	"Maruko Receives a Chain Letter" (Japanese: まる子 不幸の手紙をもらう)	April 12, 1992
Maruko's life is turned upside down when she receives a chain letter that vows misfortune if she doesn't continue to spread it on.
119	"Keep Your Notebook Neat!" (Japanese: ノートはきれいに!)	April 19, 1992
119	"Maruko the Space Case" (Japanese: ボンヤリまる子)	April 19, 1992
Maruko tries to improve her note-taking ability after seeing the truly impressive notebooks of some of her classmates. Then, Maruko tries to come to terms with her constant spacing out.
120	"Maruko is Picky Over the Taste of Tea" (Japanese: まる子 お茶の味にうるさい)	April 26, 1992
121	"Maruko's Solo Journey of Connections!" (Japanese: まる子 ふれあいの一人旅)	May 3, 1992
Maruko becomes obsessed with the idea of taking a solo journey, one where she makes a heartfelt connection with a stranger.
122	"Come on Over, Swallow!" (Japanese: ツバメよ来い来い)	May 10, 1992
122	"The Class Birthday Party" (Japanese: クラスのお誕生日会)	May 10, 1992
A frustrated Maruko tries to figure out how to get swallows to nest at her house. Then, Maruko's class holds a class birthday party for everyone with a birthday in May, and Maruko is one of the lucky guests of honor.
123	"Drawing Contest at the Zoo"	May 17, 1992
Maruko is left in the lurch when a drawing contest at the zoo requires a chaperone but neither of her parents want to attend.
124	"Non-Stop Hiccups!" (Japanese: しゃっくりが止まらない)	May 24, 1992
124	"Dad Goes to Hokkaido" (Japanese: お父さん 北海道へ行く)	May 24, 1992
Maruko is thrown into a tizzy when she hears a rumor that someone can die if they hiccup 100 times in a row. Then, Maruko looks forward to souvenirs when her father goes on a trip to Hokkaido.
125	"Yocchan’s Girlfriend" (Japanese: ヨッちゃんの彼女)	May 31, 1992
The Sakura household is set abuzz when Maruko's cousin Yocchan decides to pay a visit alongside his new girlfriend.
126	"The Bullfrog Brouhaha!" (Japanese: 食用ガエルで大騒ぎ)	June 7, 1992
Chaos is unleashed when Maruko and her friends bring a pair of bullfrogs to school.
127	"The Lid Won’t Budge!" (Japanese: フタが開かない)	June 14, 1992
127	"Maruko Wants an Hourglass" (Japanese: まる子 砂時計が欲しい)	June 14, 1992
Maruko's entire family is confounded by a hard-to-open jar. Then, Maruko becomes fixated on getting an hourglass that comes as a bonus with a tube of toothpaste.
128	"Maruko’s Big Panic!" (Japanese: まる子 大パニック)	June 21, 1992
After developing a taste for reading creepy stories, Maruko's worst fears are realized when she ends up trapped in a bathroom stall.
129	"The Joy of Ochuugen" (Japanese: うれしい お中元)	June 28, 1992
It's the ochuugen summer gift-giving season, and Maruko and her friends go to Hanawa's house to see what kind of gifts the rich receive.
130	"The Downtown Tanabata Festival" (Japanese: 商店街の七夕祭り)	July 5, 1992
It's time for the Tanabata Festival once again, and Maruko drags her father along to get him to buy her a bunch of stuff.
131	"Maruko Gets Swept Away By Bargains!" (Japanese: まる子 バーゲンの広告につられる)	July 12, 1992
Maruko gets swept up by bargain fever, only to be stunned when her mother and Sakiko end up going even more nuts than her.
132	"Tomorrow Summer Vacation Begins!" (Japanese: 明日から夏休み)	July 19, 1992
It's the last day before summer vacation, but a never-ending list of chores before school can be let out takes the wind out of Maruko's sails.
133	"The Passion of Goldfish Scooping!" (Japanese: 金魚すくいに情熱を)	July 26, 1992
Maruko, Sakiko, and Grandpa wreak havoc at a nearby fish store when they compete to determine who is the best at scooping goldfish.
134	"The Summer Vacation Mandatory Attendance Day!" (Japanese: 夏休みの登校日)	August 2, 1992
A mandatory school attendance day 10 days into summer vacation is the cure for Maruko's summertime blues, at least until she remembers some schoolwork that needs to be finished before then.
135	"Maruko Goes to the Beach" (Japanese: まる子 海水浴に行く)	August 9, 1992
Maruko and her family take a trip to the beach and make a bunch of happy (and not-so-happy) memories.
136	"Mosquitoes Suck!" (Japanese: 蚊がうるさい)	August 16, 1992
Maruko and Sakiko suffer a night of torment when they're besieged by some particularly persistent mosquitoes.
137	"Tomoegawa Fireworks Festival" (Japanese: 巴川の花火大会)	August 23, 1992
Maruko and her family get in the mood for a local fireworks festival by launching some fireworks of their own.
138	"Maruko is Afraid of Cockroaches" (Japanese: まる子 ゴキブリをこわがる)	August 30, 1992
Maruko's enjoyment of insects is put to the test when a cockroach infestation strikes home.
139	"Hanawa Teaches Maruko English" (Japanese: まる子花輪クンに英会話を習う)	September 6, 1992
Inspired by a chance encounter with a foreign tourist, Maruko decides to become a worldly cosmopolitan and begs Hanawa to teach her English.
140	"Maruko Goes Fishing" (Japanese: まる子 つりに行く)	September 13, 1992
Maruko begs to go fishing with her father, and a chance encounter with a stranger leads to unexpected results.
141	"Hanawa Has a Sweetheart?!" (Japanese: 花輪クンに恋人が!)	September 20, 1992
When the schoolyard is abuzz with rumors that Hanawa has found a girlfriend, it's up to Maruko to keep Migiwa from losing her mind.
142	"The Sakura Household’s Moon Viewing" (Japanese: さくら家のお月見)	September 27, 1992
In the finale for series 1 of Chibi Maruko-chan, Maruko and her family get ready to celebrate the annual moon-viewing festival.

== Series 2 (1995–present) ==
=== 1995 ===
No.	Title	Original release date
1	"Soccer Boy Kenta" (Japanese: サッカー少年ケン太)	January 8, 1995
Maruko’s classmate Kenta is good at soccer and trains harder than anyone. His dream is to become a pro, and Maruko quietly cheers him on.
2	"Hot Pot Disturbance" (Japanese: まる子 鍋モノさわぎ)	January 15, 1995
Blowfish is for dinner, but Maruko is unimpressed until Tamachan expresses her envy. Maruko begins to worry after learning the delicacy is poisonous.
3	"Maruko Wants to Know What's in the Box" (Japanese: まる子 つづらの中身を知りたい)	January 22, 1995
Maruko finds a wicker hamper in the closet and thinks it might hold ghouls like in an old fairy tale. She begs her family to open it, but no one will.
4	"Maruko Sings a Song" (Japanese: まる子 おフロで歌を歌う)	January 29, 1995
Maruko has a great time singing in the tub with her dad. Grandpa is moved to tears when she sings along to a record the next day.
5	"I love you, Tamachan!" (Japanese: たまちゃん大好き)	February 5, 1995
Maruko and Tamachan make a time capsule with letters for each other to read in 20 years’ time. Unfortunately, things don’t turn out as planned.
6	"Maruko Wants to Give Out Chocolate" (Japanese: まる子 誰かにチョコをあげたい)	February 12, 1995
It’s Valentine’s Day. Maruko goes to buy chocolate for her dad because Tamachan said it would make him happy, but she’s out of cash for Grandpa.
7	"Maruko Loses to the Cold" (Japanese: まる子 寒さに負ける)	February 19, 1995
It’s so cold, Maruko is glued to the kotatsu heater and won’t even go play with Tamachan. She finally gets up when Mom yells at her to take a bath.
8	"Sakiko Finally Let's Maruko Have Fun" (Japanese: お姉ちゃん ついにまる子にあいそをつかす)	February 26, 1995
Worried about Maruko’s laziness, her mom asks her sister to tutor her. Sakiko does nothing but berate Maruko as she shows no intention of studying.
9	"Maruko Wastes Money at a Picture Story Show" (Japanese: まる子 紙芝居屋で浪費する)	March 5, 1995
The picture story showman is in town. Maruko loves the sweets you can buy before the show, so she empties her piggy bank and heads over to the park.
10	"Let's Exchange Diaries!" (Japanese: 交換日記をしよう)	March 12, 1995
After Maruko learns Sakiko is exchanging a diary with her classmate, she starts doing the same with Tamachan. Then Misuzu says she wants to join in.
11	"Nagasawa's Housewarming Party" (Japanese: 永沢君ち 新築パーティー)	March 19, 1995
Nagasawa is happy to be at the center of attention for once at his housewarming party, but Yamada comes over uninvited and ruins his good mood.
12	"Take Back the Letter I Sent!!" (Japanese: 出した手紙をとりもどせ!!)	March 26, 1995
Grandpa worries that his friend will never pay him back. Soon after he follows Maruko’s suggestion to send his friend a letter, a package arrives.
13	"April Fool's Day" (Japanese: エイプリルフール)	April 2, 1995
Maruko gets tricked by her sister when she forgets about April Fool’s Day. She tries to fool others, but her schemes don’t go according to plan.
14	"Professional Baseball Season Begins" (Japanese: プロ野球開幕)	April 9, 1995
Hiroshi makes the rest of his family unhappy with his obsession when he starts hogging the TV to watch professional baseball.
15	"Today is Saint George's Day" (Japanese: 今日はサンジョルディーの日)	April 16, 1995
Maruko talks to her friends about giving books to the people they like after learning about Saint George’s Day customs from her sister.
16	"Gathering of friends" (Japanese: なかよしの集い)	April 23, 1995
17	"Maruko Forgot Something" (Japanese: まる子 忘れ物をする)	April 30, 1995
18	"Maruko goes to a Sushi Restaurant" (Japanese: まる子 フェスタしずおかへ行く)	May 7, 1995
19	"Maruko really wants a Roller Through Gogo!!" (Japanese: まる子 ローラースルーゴーゴーが どうしても欲しい!!)	May 14, 1995
31	"Maruko goes to Festa Shizuoka" (Japanese: まる子 フェスタしずおかへ行く)	August 6, 1995
40	"Takashi-kun" (Japanese: たかしくん)	October 8, 1995
Maruko wants to stop Sekiguchi from bullying Takashi, who loves dogs and puppies.
41	"Maruko Grows Shiitake Mushrooms" (Japanese: まる子 シイタケの栽培をする)	October 15, 1995
42	"Maruko Goes to See a Drama Filming" (Japanese: まる子 ドラマのロケを見に行く)	October 22, 1995
43	"Let's Have a Halloween Party" (Japanese: ハロウィンパーティーをやろう)	October 29, 1995

=== 1996 ===
No.	Title	Original release date
53	"N/A"	January 7, 1996
64	"The Beatles and the Zutorubi"	March 24, 1996
Maruko discovers The Beatles and joins a Zutorubi fan club against her will.

=== 1997 ===
No.	Title	Original release date
102	"N/A"	January 5, 1997

=== 1998 ===
No.	Title	Original release date
154	"N/A"	January 4, 1998

=== 1999 ===
No.	Title	Original release date
205	"N/A"	January 3, 1999

=== 2000 ===
No.	Title	Original release date
254	"N/A"	January 9, 2000

=== 2001 ===
No.	Title	Original release date
341	"N/A"	October 7, 2001
Maruko’s next-door neighbor practices piano for a company event, but his lack of talent proves stressful for the Sakura household.
342	"N/A"	October 14, 2001
Maruko is shocked to be named as alternate for the team relay on Sports Day. Things only get worse when she has to replace an injured team member.
343	"N/A"	October 21, 2001
Crybaby Midori has a crush on Fujiki, so she asks Maruko to bring Fujiki along with her to her birthday party. Maruko isn’t exactly happy about this.
344	"N/A"	October 28, 2001
Maruko is envious of Tamachan’s photos of her recent trip to see fall scenery. The Sakuras plan their own outing, but traffic gets in their way.
345	"N/A"	November 4, 2001
The ceiling in Maruko’s room leaks! When the carpenter who fixes it extols the view from the roof, Maruko and Tamachan decide to see for themselves.
346	"N/A"	November 11, 2001
Maruko is upset to find her winter knits have moth holes. Her sister fixes them with appliqués, but that comes with its own set of problems.
347	"N/A"	November 18, 2001
One day Migiwa’s unfriendly-looking dog runs off. Maruko and friends are recruited to help find it and bring it home.
348	"N/A"	November 25, 2001
Maruko’s class decides on its performance for the arts festival. They pick the story of a samurai-era battle, and Maruko is given a leading role.
349	"N/A"	December 2, 2001
Maruko pours her heart into the class play rehearsals and makes a great warrior. However, Fujiki struggles quite a bit with his role.
350	(Japanese: 「マンガ禁止令」の巻)	December 9, 2001
350	(Japanese: 「まる子、微熱をだす」の巻)	December 9, 2001
When Maruko doesn’t do her chores, her mother takes away her comic books. Next, Maruko gets a slight fever during gym class and everyone makes a fuss.

=== 2002 ===
No.	Title	Original release date
354	(Japanese: 「まる子、たまちゃんちにお泊まりする」の巻)	January 6, 2002
354	(Japanese: 「まる子、おみくじに振り回される」の巻)	January 6, 2002

=== 2003 ===
No.	Title	Original release date
404	(Japanese: 「まる子、初売りに行く」の巻)	January 12, 2003
404	(Japanese: 「まる子、香りを探す」の巻)	January 12, 2003

=== 2004 ===
No.	Title	Original release date
455	(Japanese: 「お正月ボケを治そう」の巻)	January 4, 2004
455	(Japanese: 「家のお宝」の巻)	January 4, 2004

=== 2005 ===
No.	Title	Original release date
502	(Japanese: 「まる子、睡眠不足になる」の巻)	January 16, 2005
502	(Japanese: 「キャッチフレーズを作ろう」の巻)	January 16, 2005

=== 2006 ===
No.	Title	Original release date
551	(Japanese: 「羽根つきをしよう」の巻)	January 8, 2006
551	(Japanese: 「夢のかまくら」の巻)	January 8, 2006

=== 2007 ===
No.	Title	Original release date
598	(Japanese: 「まる子、おしるこが待ち遠しい」の巻)	January 7, 2007
598	(Japanese: 「まる子のオリジナル」の巻)	January 7, 2007

=== 2008 ===
No.	Title	Original release date
648	(Japanese: 「新春! カルタ大会」の巻)	January 6, 2008
648	(Japanese: 「さくら家の鏡びらき」の巻)	January 6, 2008

=== 2009 ===
No.	Title	Original release date
698	(Japanese: 「まる子、今年の運勢は?」の巻)	January 4, 2009
698	(Japanese: 「まる子、初夢を見たい」の巻)	January 4, 2009

=== 2010 ===
No.	Title	Original release date
790	"Grandma and a cat" (Japanese: 「「台所で勉強を」の巻)	December 19, 2010
790	"Maruko caring her skin" (Japanese: 「オトナの女性を目指そう!」の巻)	December 19, 2010

=== 2011 ===
No.	English Dub title Original Japanese title	Original release date
792	"Maruko wants to be bitten by Shishimai" (Japanese: 「まる子、獅子舞にかまれたい」の巻)	January 9, 2011
792	"Maruko wishes that the New Year's Holiday Mood would linger" (Japanese: 「お正月気分をもう少し」の巻)	January 9, 2011
793	"Maruko hosts her Uncle" (Japanese: 「「まる子、おじさんをもてなす」の巻)	January 16, 2011
793	"Friendship in the Marathon Race" (Japanese: 「マラソン大会の友情」の巻)	January 16, 2011
794	"Ways to prevent catching a cold" (Japanese: 「風邪をひかない方法」の巻)	January 23, 2011
794	"Maruko wants to eat Nabeyaki-Udon" (Japanese: 「まる子、鍋焼きうどんが食べたい」の巻)	January 23, 2011
795	"Mr. Togawa's Birthday" (Japanese: 「戸川先生の誕生日」の巻)	January 30, 2011
795	"Setsubun Party at Hanawa Residence" (Japanese: 「花輪くんちの節分パーティー」の巻)	January 30, 2011
796	"Dad's secret base" (Japanese: 「お父さんの秘密基地」の巻)	February 6, 2011
796	"Our Notebook" (Japanese: 「みんなのノート」の巻)	February 6, 2011
797	"Valentine for Maruo-kun" (Japanese: 「丸尾くんのバレンタイン」の巻)	February 13, 2011
797	"Treat in the winter" (Japanese: 「冬のごちそう」の巻)	February 13, 2011
798	"Migiwa-san, a girl in Love" (Japanese: 「恋する乙女、みぎわさん」の巻)	February 20, 2011
798	"Dining out with the Family" (Japanese: 「みんなでレストランに行こう」の巻)	February 20, 2011
799	"Maeda-san's vase" (Japanese: 「前田さんの花びん」の巻)	February 27, 2011
799	"Maruko wishes to have a lucky one" (Japanese: 「まる子、幸せの一本が欲しい」の巻)	February 27, 2011
800	"Noguchi-san on ice" (Japanese: 「氷上の野口さん」の巻)	March 6, 2011
800	"I spot a little spring!" (Japanese: 「小さな春、見―つけた!」の巻)	March 6, 2011
811	"I Feel blue on a Parents' Visiting Day" (Japanese: 「ゆううつな参観日」の巻)	May 29, 2011
811	"A Tutor comes to My House" (Japanese: 「家庭教師がやってきた」の巻)	May 29, 2011

=== 2012 ===
No.	English Dub title Original Japanese title	Original release date
844	"Maruko wants to give chocolate to someone" (Japanese: 「まる子、だれかにチョコをあげたい」の巻)	February 5, 2012
844	"Maruko hates woolen panties" (Japanese: 「まる子、毛糸のパンツをいやがる」の巻)	February 5, 2012
873	(Japanese: 「100年後のまる子」の巻)	September 16, 2012
873	(Japanese: 「花輪くんがいなくなった!?」の巻)	September 16, 2012

=== 2013 ===
No.	Title	Original release date
888	(Japanese: 「野口さん、羽根つきに燃える?」の巻)	January 6, 2013

=== 2014 ===
No.	Title	Original release date
937	(Japanese: 「さくら家の元旦」の巻)	January 5, 2014

=== 2015 ===
No.	English Dub title Original Japanese title	Original release date
1032	"Maruko buys baked sweet potatoes" (Japanese: 「まる子、いしやきいもを買う」の巻)	December 6, 2015
1032	"The cold weather gets the better of Maruko" (Japanese: 「まる子、寒さに負ける」の巻)	December 6, 2015

=== 2016 ===
No.	English Dub title Original Japanese title	Original release date
1035	(Japanese: 「まる子、お年玉で蟹を買う」の巻)	January 10, 2016
1035	(Japanese: 「まる子、手帳を使う」の巻)	January 10, 2016

=== 2017 ===
No.	English Dub title Original Japanese title	Original release date
1084	(Japanese: 「おじいちゃん、年賀状の事を気にする」の巻)	January 8, 2017
1084	"continued (no title)"	January 8, 2017

=== 2018 ===
No.	English Dub title Original Japanese title	Original release date
1132	(Japanese: 「藤木、新年最初に話したい」の巻)	January 7, 2018
1132	(Japanese: 「まる子、お年玉で夢を買う」の巻)	January 7, 2018

=== 2019 ===
No.	English Dub title Original Japanese title	Original release date
1179	(Japanese: 「まる子、早くもお正月が待ち遠しい」の巻)	January 13, 2019
1179	(Japanese: 「中野さん、お年玉で悩む」の巻)	January 13, 2019

=== 2024 ===
No.	English Dub title Original Japanese title	Original release date
1447	"Hiroshi Teaches Baseball" (Japanese: 「ヒロシ、野球を教える」の巻)	September 15, 2024
1447	"Mom Wants to Cut Maruko's Hair" (Japanese: 「お母さん、まる子の髪を切りたい」の巻)	September 15, 2024
Hiroshi plays in a local baseball game and ends up teaching some of the boys baseball. Then, when Maruko's hair becomes long, Mom cuts it for her. Maruko isn't very happy about this and wants to go a beauty salon.
1458	"Sakiko Makes a Hideki Corner" (Japanese: お姉ちゃん、ヒデキコーナーを作る)	November 17, 2024
1458	"Take a Picture Towards the Sunset!" (Japanese: 夕陽に向かって撮れ！)	November 17, 2024
Sakiko makes a Hideki Saijo corner and Maruko follows suit with a Momoe Yamaguchi corner. Then, Tamae's dad goes to take pictures of the sunset with Maruko and Tamae.
