= List of animated short films of the 1940s =

Films are sorted by year and then alphabetically. They include theatrical, television, and direct-to-video films with less than 40 minutes runtime. For a list of films with over 40 minutes of runtime, see List of animated feature films of the 1940s.

== 1940 ==
Name	Country	Technique
100 Pygmies and Andy Panda	United States	Traditional Animation
Africa Squeaks	United States	Traditional Animation
Ali-Baba Bound	United States	Traditional Animation
Andy Panda Goes Fishing	United States	Traditional Animation
Ants in the Plants	United States	Traditional Animation
The Bear's Tale	United States	Traditional Animation
Bedtime for Sniffles	United States	Traditional Animation
Billposters	United States	Traditional Animation
Billy Mouse's Akwakade	United States	Traditional Animation
Blackboard Revue	United States	Traditional Animation
Boogie-Doodle	Canada	Traditional Animation
Bone Trouble	United States	Traditional Animation
A Boy, a Gun and Birds	United States	Traditional Animation
Bring Himself Back Alive	United States	Traditional Animation
Busy Bakers	United States	Traditional Animation
Calling Dr. Porky	United States	Traditional Animation
Catnip Capers	United States	Traditional Animation
Ceiling Hero	United States	Traditional Animation
The Chewin' Bruin	United States	Traditional Animation
Circus Today	United States	Traditional Animation
Club Life in the Stone Age	United States	Traditional Animation
Confederate Honey	United States	Traditional Animation
The Constable	United States	Traditional Animation
Crazy House	United States	Traditional Animation
Cross-Country Detours	United States	Traditional Animation
The Dandy Lion	United States	Traditional Animation
A Dog in a Mansion	United States	Traditional Animation
Doing Impossikible Stunts	United States	Traditional Animation
Donald's Dog Laundry	United States	Traditional Animation
Donald's Vacation	United States	Traditional Animation
Dots	Canada	Abstract Animation
The Early Worm Gets the Bird	United States	Traditional Animation
The Egg Collector	United States	Traditional Animation
The Egg Hunt	United States	Traditional Animation
Elmer's Candid Camera	United States	Traditional Animation
Females is Fickle	United States	Traditional Animation
Fightin' Pals	United States	Traditional Animation
Fire Chief	United States	Traditional Animation
Fish Follies	United States	Traditional Animation
The Fishing Bear	United States	Traditional Animation
Gallopin' Gals	United States	Traditional Animation
A Gander at Mother Goose	United States	Traditional Animation
Ghost Wanted	United States	Traditional Animation
Good Night Elmer	United States	Traditional Animation
Goofy's Glider	United States	Traditional Animation
Granite Hotel	United States	Traditional Animation
The Greyhound and the Rabbit	United States	Traditional Animation
Happy Holidays	United States	Traditional Animation
Happy Hunting Grounds	United States	Traditional Animation
The Happy Tots' Expedition	United States	Traditional Animation
The Hardship of Miles Standish	United States	Traditional Animation
The Hare and the Hounds	United States	Traditional Animation
Harvest Time	United States	Traditional Animation
Holiday Highlights	United States	Traditional Animation
Home on the Range	United States	Traditional Animation
The Homeless Flea	United States	Traditional Animation
How Wet Was My Ocean	United States	Traditional Animation
Just a Little Bull	United States	Traditional Animation
King for a Day	United States	Traditional Animation
Knock Knock	United States	Traditional Animation
Landing of the Pilgrims	United States	Traditional Animation
Little Blabbermouse	United States	Traditional Animation
Little Lambkins	United States	Traditional Animation
The Lonesome Stranger	United States	Traditional Animation
Loops	Canada	Abstract Animation
The Mad Hatter	United States	Traditional Animation
Malibu Beach Party	United States	Traditional Animation
Man of Tin	United States	Traditional Animation
Me Feelins is Hurt	United States	Traditional Animation
Mighty Hunters	United States	Traditional Animation
The Milky Way	United States	Traditional Animation
Mommy Loves Puppy	United States	Traditional Animation
The Mouse Exterminator	United States	Traditional Animation
Mr. Duck Steps Out	United States	Traditional Animation
Mr. Elephant Goes to Town	United States	Traditional Animation
Mr. Mouse Takes a Trip	United States	Traditional Animation
Mrs. Ladybug	United States	Traditional Animation
My Pop, My Pop	United States	Traditional Animation
News Oddities	United States	Traditional Animation
Nurse-Mates	United States	Traditional Animation
Of Fox and Hounds	United States	Traditional Animation
Onion Pacific	United States	Traditional Animation
Patient Porky	United States	Traditional Animation
Pilgrim Porky	United States	Traditional Animation
Pluto's Dream House	United States	Traditional Animation
Popeye Meets William Tell	United States	Traditional Animation
Popeye Presents Eugene, the Jeep	United States	Traditional Animation
Porky's Baseball Broadcast	United States	Traditional Animation
Porky's Hired Hand	United States	Traditional Animation
Porky's Last Stand	United States	Traditional Animation
Porky's Poor Fish	United States	Traditional Animation
Prehistoric Porky	United States	Traditional Animation
Puss Gets the Boot	United States	Traditional Animation
Put-Put Troubles	United States	Traditional Animation
The Riveter	United States	Traditional Animation
Romeo in Rhythm	United States	Traditional Animation
Rover's Rescue	United States	Traditional Animation
Rupert the Runt	United States	Traditional Animation
School Boy Dreams	United States	Traditional Animation
Shakespearean Spinach	United States	Traditional Animation
Shop Look & Listen	United States	Traditional Animation
Slap-Happy Pappy	United States	Traditional Animation
Sneak, Snoop, and Snitch	United States	Traditional Animation
Sniffles Takes a Trip	United States	Traditional Animation
The Sour Puss	United States	Traditional Animation
Stage Fright	United States	Traditional Animation
Stealin Aint Honest	United States	Traditional Animation
Der Störenfried	Germany	Traditional Animation
Tangled Television	United States	Traditional Animation
The Temperamental Lion	United States	Traditional Animation
The Timid Pup	United States	Traditional Animation
The Timid Toreador	United States	Traditional Animation
Tom Thumb in Trouble	United States	Traditional Animation
Touchdown Demons	United States	Traditional Animation
Tugboat Mickey	United States	Traditional Animation
The Volunteer Worker	United States	Traditional Animation
Wacky Wildlife	United States	Traditional Animation
A Wild Hare	United States	Traditional Animation
Wimmin Hadn't Oughta Drive	United States	Traditional Animation
Wimmin is a Myskery	United States	Traditional Animation
Window Cleaners	United States	Traditional Animation
Wise Owl	United States	Traditional Animation
Ye Olde Swap Shoppe	United States	Traditional Animation
You Ought to Be in Pictures	United States	Live-action/traditional

== 1941 ==
Name	Country	Technique
7 Wise Dwarfs	Canada	Traditional Animation
A Coy Decoy	United States	Traditional Animation
All This and Rabbit Stew	United States	Traditional Animation
The Alley Cat	United States	Traditional Animation
All's Well	United States	Traditional Animation
Andy Panda's Pop	United States	Traditional Animation
The Art of Self Defense	United States	Traditional Animation
The Art of Skiing	United States	Traditional Animation
Aviation Vacation	United States	Traditional Animation
Baggage Buster	United States	Traditional Animation
Boogie Woogie Bugle Boy of Company B	United States	Traditional Animation
The Bug Parade	United States	Traditional Animation
The Cagey Canary	United States	Traditional Animation
Canine Caddy	United States	Traditional Animation
Child Psykolojiky	United States	Traditional Animation
The Crackpot Quail	United States	Traditional Animation
The Crystal Gazer	United States	Traditional Animation
The Cuckoo I.Q.	United States	Traditional Animation
The Cute Recruit	United States	Traditional Animation
Dizzy Kitty	United States	Traditional Animation
Il dottor Churkill	Italy	Traditional Animation
Down on the Farm	United States	Traditional Animation
Elmer's Pet Rabbit	United States	Traditional Animation
Fire Cheese	United States	Traditional Animation
Flies Ain't Human	United States	Traditional Animation
The Flying Bear	United States	Traditional Animation
The Fox and the Grapes	United States	Traditional Animation
Gabby Goes Fishing	United States	Traditional Animation
A Gentleman's Gentleman	United States	Traditional Animation
Goofy Groceries	United States	Traditional Animation
The Haunted Mouse	United States	Traditional Animation
The Heckling Hare	United States	Traditional Animation
A Helping Paw	United States	Traditional Animation
The Henpecked Duck	United States	Traditional Animation
Hiawatha's Rabbit Hunt	United States	Traditional Animation
Hollywood Steps Out	United States	Traditional Animation
How to Bridge a Gorge	United States	Stop-motion Animation
How War Came	United States	Traditional Animation
The Hungry Wolf	United States	Traditional Animation
It's a Hap-Hap-Happy Day	United States	Traditional Animation
I'll Never Crow Again	United States	Traditional Animation
The Land of Fun	United States	Traditional Animation
Lend a Paw	United States	Traditional Animation
The Little Theatre	United States	Traditional Animation
The Little Whirlwind	United States	Traditional Animation
The Mechanical Monsters	United States	Traditional Animation
The Merry Mouse Cafe	United States	Traditional Animation
The Midnight Snack	United States	Traditional Animation
The Mighty Navy	United States	Traditional Animation
Mouse Trappers	United States	Traditional Animation
The Nifty Nineties	United States	Traditional Animation
The Night Before Christmas	United States	Traditional Animation
Nix on Hypnotricks	United States	Traditional Animation
Officer Pooch	United States	Traditional Animation
Olive's Boithday Presink	United States	Traditional Animation
Olive's Sweepstake Ticket	United States	Traditional Animation
Orphans' Benefit	United States	Traditional Animation
Pantry Panic	United States	Traditional Animation
Pest Pilot	United States	Traditional Animation
Popeye Meets Rip Van Winkle	United States	Traditional Animation
Porky's Pooch	United States	Traditional Animation
Porky's Preview	United States	Traditional Animation
Problem Pappy	United States	Traditional Animation
The Prospecting Bear	United States	Traditional Animation
Quiet! Pleeze	United States	Traditional Animation
Raggedy Ann and Raggedy Andy	United States	Traditional Animation
Red Riding Hood Rides Again	United States	Traditional Animation
Rhapsody in Rivets	United States	Traditional Animation
Rhythm in the Ranks	United States	Stop-motion Animation
The Rookie Bear	United States	Traditional Animation
$21 a Day (Once a Month)	United States	Traditional Animation
The Screwdriver	United States	Traditional Animation
Scrub Me Mama with a Boogie Beat	United States	Traditional Animation
Superman	United States	Traditional Animation
Swing Cleaning	United States	Traditional Animation
The Tangled Angler	United States	Traditional Animation
There's Music in Your Hair	United States	Traditional Animation
The Thrifty Pig	Canada	Traditional Animation
Timber	United States	Traditional Animation
Tom Thumb's Brother	United States	Traditional Animation
Tortoise Beats Hare	United States	Traditional Animation
Truant Officer Donald	United States	Traditional Animation
Two for the Zoo	United States	Traditional Animation
Wabbit Twouble	United States	Traditional Animation
The Wallflower	United States	Traditional Animation
The Way of All Pests	United States	Traditional Animation
When Knights Were Bold	United States	Traditional Animation
Who's Zoo in Hollywood	United States	Traditional Animation
Woody Woodpecker	United States	Traditional Animation

== 1942 ==
Name	Country	Technique
Ace in the Hole	United States	Traditional Animation
Air Raid Warden	United States	Traditional Animation
All Out for 'V'	United States	Traditional Animation
All Together	Canada, United States	Traditional Animation
Aloha Hooey	United States	Traditional Animation
Alona on the Sarong Seas	United States	Traditional Animation
All About Dogs	United States	Traditional Animation
Andy Panda's Victory Garden	United States	Traditional Animation
Any Bonds Today?	United States	Traditional Animation
The Arctic Giant	United States	Traditional Animation
Baby Wants a Bottleship	United States	Traditional Animation
A Battle for a Bottle	United States	Traditional Animation
Bats in the Belfry	United States	Traditional Animation
Barney Bear's Victory Garden	United States	Traditional Animation
The Bear and the Beavers	United States	Traditional Animation
Bellboy Donald	United States	Traditional Animation
Billion Dollar Limited	United States	Traditional Animation
The Bird Came C.O.D.	United States	Traditional Animation
Blitz Wolf	United States	Traditional Animation
Blunder Below	United States	Traditional Animation
Boogie Woogie Sioux	United States	Traditional Animation
The Bowling Alley-Cat	United States	Traditional Animation
Bugs Bunny Gets the Boid	United States	Traditional Animation
The Bulleteers	United States	Traditional Animation
El capitán Tormentoso	Spain	Traditional Animation
Case of the Missing Hare	United States	Traditional Animation
Chips Off the Old Block	United States	Traditional Animation
Cholly Polly	United States	Traditional Animation
Cinderella Goes to a Party	United States	Traditional Animation
Concerto in B Flat Minor	United States	Traditional Animation
Conrad the Sailor	United States	Traditional Animation
Crazy Cruise	United States	Traditional Animation
The Daffy Duckaroo	United States	Traditional Animation
Der Fuehrer's Face	United States	Traditional Animation
Destruction, Inc.	United States	Traditional Animation
Ding Dog Daddy	United States	Traditional Animation
Dog Meets Dog	United States	Traditional Animation
Dog Trouble	United States	Traditional Animation
Doing Their Bit	United States	Traditional Animation
Donald's Decision	Canada, United States	Traditional Animation
The Dover Boys	United States	Traditional Animation
The Ducktators	United States	Traditional Animation
The Dumbconscious Mind	United States	Traditional Animation
The Early Bird Dood It!	United States	Traditional Animation
Electric Earthquake	United States	Traditional Animation
Eleventh Hour	United States	Traditional Animation
Fine Feathered Friend	United States	Traditional Animation
Fleets of Stren'th	United States	Traditional Animation
Food Will Win the War	United States	Traditional Animation
Fraidy Cat	United States	Traditional Animation
Frankenstein's Cat	United States	Traditional Animation
Fresh Hare	United States	Traditional Animation
Gopher Goofy	United States	Traditional Animation
Good-Bye Mr. Moth	United States	Traditional Animation
The Gullible Canary	United States	Traditional Animation
The Hams That Couldn't Be Cured	United States	Traditional Animation
Happy Circus Days	United States	Traditional Animation
The Hare-Brained Hypnotist	United States	Traditional Animation
Hen Hop	Canada	Traditional Animation
The Hep Cat	United States	Traditional Animation
Hold the Lion, Please	United States	Traditional Animation
A Hollywood Detour	United States	Traditional Animation
The Hollywood Matador	United States	Traditional Animation
Horton Hatches the Egg	United States	Traditional Animation
A Hull of a Mess	United States	Traditional Animation
The Hungry Wolf	United States	Traditional Animation
Ickle Meets Pickle	United States	Traditional Animation
Japoteurs	United States	Traditional Animation
Jasper and the Haunted House	United States	Stop-motion Animation
Juke Box Jamboree	United States	Traditional Animation
Kickin' the Conga 'Round	United States	Traditional Animation
Life with Fido	United States	Traditional Animation
The Loan Stranger	United States	Traditional Animation
The Magnetic Telescope	United States	Traditional Animation
Malice in Slumberland	United States	Traditional Animation
Many Tanks	United States	Traditional Animation
Me Musical Nephews	United States	Traditional Animation
Mickey's Birthday Party	United States	Traditional Animation
The Mouse of Tomorrow	United States	Traditional Animation
My Favorite Duck	United States	Traditional Animation
The New Spirit	United States	Traditional Animation
Nutty News	United States	Traditional Animation
Nutty Pine Cabin	United States	Traditional Animation
Oh, Gentle Spring	United States	Traditional Animation
Old Blackout Joe	United States	Traditional Animation
Olive Oyl and Water Don't Mix	United States	Traditional Animation
Out of the Frying Pan into the Firing Line	United States	Traditional Animation
Pipeye, Pupeye, Poopeye, and Peepeye	United States	Traditional Animation
Pigs in a Polka	United States	Traditional Animation
Porky's Cafe	United States	Traditional Animation
Porky's Pastry Pirates	United States	Traditional Animation
Puss n' Toots	United States	Traditional Animation
The Raven	United States	Traditional Animation
Scrap the Japs	United States	Traditional Animation
Sham Battle Shenanigans	United States	Traditional Animation
Showdown	United States	Traditional Animation
The Sleepwalker	United States	Traditional Animation
Somewhere in the Pacific	United States	Traditional Animation
The Squawkin' Hawk	United States	Traditional Animation
Stop That Tank!	Canada	Traditional Animation
The Stork's Mistake	United States	Traditional Animation
Symphony Hour	United States	Traditional Animation
A Tale of Two Kitties	United States	Traditional Animation
Terror on the Midway	United States	Traditional Animation
Tulips Shall Grow	United States	Stop-motion Animation
Under the Shedding Chestnut Tree	United States	Traditional Animation
Under the Spreading Blacksmith Shop	United States	Traditional Animation
Volcano	United States	Traditional Animation
The Wabbit Who Came to Supper	United States	Traditional Animation
Wacky Blackout	United States	Traditional Animation
The Wacky Wabbit	United States	Traditional Animation
Wacky Wigwams	United States	Traditional Animation
The Wild and Woozy West	United States	Traditional Animation
Wild Honey (Or How to Get Along Without a Ration Book!)	United States	Traditional Animation
Wilful Willie	United States	Traditional Animation
Woodman, Spare Me That Tree	United States	Traditional Animation
Yankee Doodle Swing Shift	United States	Traditional Animation
You're a Sap, Mr. Jap	United States	Traditional Animation

== 1943 ==
Name	Country	Technique
The 500 Hats of Bartholomew Cubbins	United States	Traditional Animation
The Aristo-Cat	United States	Traditional Animation
Baby Puss	United States	Traditional Animation
Bah Wilderness	United States	Traditional Animation
Barney Bear and the Uninvited Pest	United States	Traditional Animation
The Boy and the Wolf	United States	Traditional Animation
Canine Commandos	United States	Traditional Animation
Cartoons Ain't Human	United States	Traditional Animation
Chicken Little	United States	Traditional Animation
Coal Black and de Sebben Dwarfs	United States	Traditional Animation
Coming!! Snafu	United States	Traditional Animation
Confusions of a Nutzy Spy	United States	Traditional Animation
A Corny Concerto	United States	Traditional Animation
Cow-Cow Boogie	United States	Traditional Animation
Daffy – The Commando	United States	Traditional Animation
Defense Against Invasion	United States	Traditional Animation
The Dizzy Acrobat	United States	Traditional Animation
Dizzy Newsreel	United States	Traditional Animation
Down with Cats	United States	Traditional Animation
Dumb-Hounded	United States	Traditional Animation
Duty and the Beast	United States	Traditional Animation
Education for Death	United States	Traditional Animation
Eggs Don't Bounce	United States	Traditional Animation
Falling Hare	United States	Traditional Animation
The Fifth-Column Mouse	United States	Traditional Animation
Fighting Tools	United States	Traditional Animation
Flop Goes the Weasel	United States	Traditional Animation
The Goldbrick	United States	Traditional Animation
The Grain That Built a Hemisphere	United States	Traditional Animation
Greetings Bait	United States	Traditional Animation
Gripes	United States	Traditional Animation
Guadalcanal	United States	Stop-motion Animation
Happy Birthdaze	United States	Traditional Animation
He Dood It Again	United States	Traditional Animation
Her Honor the Mare	United States	Traditional Animation
Hiss and Make Up	United States	Traditional Animation
The Home Front	United States	Traditional Animation
Hop and Go	United States	Traditional Animation
The Hungry Goat	United States	Traditional Animation
Imagination	United States	Traditional Animation
The Infantry Blues	United States	Traditional Animation
Inki and the Minah Bird	United States	Traditional Animation
An Itch in Time	United States	Traditional Animation
Jack-Wabbit and the Beanstalk	United States	Traditional Animation
A Jolly Good Furlough	United States	Traditional Animation
Jungle Drums	United States	Traditional Animation
Kindly Scram	United States	Traditional Animation
Kumo to Tulip	Japan	Anime
The Lion and the Mouse	United States	Traditional Animation
The Lonesome Mouse	United States	Traditional Animation
The Marry-Go-Round	United States	Traditional Animation
Mass Mouse Meeting	United States	Traditional Animation
Meatless Tuesday	United States	Traditional Animation
Momotarō no Umiwashi	Japan	Anime
The Mummy Strikes	United States	Traditional Animation
No Mutton fer Nuttin'	United States	Traditional Animation
Patriotic Pooches	United States	Traditional Animation
Pandora's Box	United States	Traditional Animation
Pluto and the Armadillo	United States	Traditional Animation
Porky Pig's Feat	United States	Traditional Animation
Puss n' Booty	United States	Traditional Animation
Ration Bored	United States	Traditional Animation
Ration Fer the Duration	United States	Traditional Animation
Reason and Emotion	United States	Traditional Animation
Red Hot Riding Hood	United States	Traditional Animation
Room and Bored	United States	Traditional Animation
Rumors	United States	Traditional Animation
Scrap for Victory	United States	Traditional Animation
Scrap Happy Daffy	United States	Traditional Animation
The Screwball	United States	Traditional Animation
Secret Agent	United States	Traditional Animation
Seein' Red, White 'N' Blue	United States	Traditional Animation
Spies	United States	Traditional Animation
Spinach Fer Britain	United States	Traditional Animation
The Spirit of '43	United States	Traditional Animation
The Stork's Holiday	United States	Traditional Animation
Sufferin' Cats!	United States	Traditional Animation
Super Mouse Rides Again	United States	Traditional Animation
Super-Rabbit	United States	Traditional Animation
Take Heed Mr. Tojo	United States	Traditional Animation
Tin Pan Alley Cats	United States	Traditional Animation
To Duck or Not to Duck	United States	Traditional Animation
Tokio Jokio	United States	Traditional Animation
Too Weak to Work	United States	Traditional Animation
Tortoise Wins by a Hare	United States	Traditional Animation
The Unbearable Bear	United States	Traditional Animation
The Underground World	United States	Traditional Animation
Verwitterte Melodie	Germany	Traditional Animation
The Vitamin G-Man	United States	Traditional Animation
Wackiki Wabbit	United States	Traditional Animation
War Dogs	United States	Traditional Animation
Way Down Yonder in the Corn	United States	Traditional Animation
What's Buzzin' Buzzard?	United States	Traditional Animation
Who Killed Who?	United States	Traditional Animation
Willoughby's Magic Hat	United States	Traditional Animation
The Winged Scourge	United States	Traditional Animation
The Wise Quacking Duck	United States	Traditional Animation
Wood-Peckin'	United States	Traditional Animation
Yankee Doodle Daffy	United States	Traditional Animation
The Yankee Doodle Mouse	United States	Traditional Animation

== 1944 ==
Name	Country	Technique
Amoozin' but Confoozin'	United States	Traditional Animation
And to Think That I Saw It on Mulberry Street	United States	Traditional Animation
Angel Puss	United States	Traditional Animation
The Anvil Chorus Girl	United States	Traditional Animation
As the Fly Flies	United States	Traditional Animation
At the Circus	United States	Traditional Animation
The Barber of Seville	United States	Traditional Animation
Barney Bear's Polar Pest	United States	Traditional Animation
Be Patient, Patient	United States	Traditional Animation
Bear Raid Warden	United States	Traditional Animation
The Beach Nut	United States	Traditional Animation
Big Heel-Watha	United States	Traditional Animation
Birdy and the Beast	United States	Traditional Animation
The Bodyguard	United States	Traditional Animation
Booby Hatched	United States	Traditional Animation
Booby Traps	United States	Traditional Animation
Brother Brat	United States	Traditional Animation
Buckaroo Bugs	United States	Traditional Animation
Bugs Bunny and the Three Bears	United States	Traditional Animation
Bugs Bunny Nips the Nips	United States	Traditional Animation
The Butcher of Seville	United States	Traditional Animation
Camouflage	United States	Traditional Animation
Carmen's Veranda	United States	Traditional Animation
The Case of the Screaming Bishop	United States	Traditional Animation
The Cat Came Back	United States	Traditional Animation
Censored	United States	Traditional Animation
The Champion of Justice	United States	Traditional Animation
The Chow Hound	United States	Traditional Animation
Cilly Goose	United States	Traditional Animation
Commando Duck	United States	Traditional Animation
Contrary Condor	United States	Traditional Animation
A Day in June	United States	Traditional Animation
Dear Old Switzerland	United States	Traditional Animation
Dog, Cat and Canary	United States	Traditional Animation
Donald Duck and the Gorilla	United States	Traditional Animation
Donald's Off Day	United States	Traditional Animation
The Dream Kids	United States	Traditional Animation
Das dumme Gänslein	Germany	Traditional Animation
Duck Soup to Nuts	United States	Traditional Animation
The Egg-Yegg	United States	Traditional Animation
Eggs Don't Bounce	United States	Traditional Animation
Eliza on the Ice	United States	Traditional Animation
Fish Fry	United States	Traditional Animation
The Frog and the Princess	United States	Traditional Animation
From Hand to Mouse	United States	Traditional Animation
Gabriel Churchkitten	United States	Traditional Animation
Gas	United States	Traditional Animation
Giddy-Yapping	United States	Traditional Animation
Goldilocks and the Jivin' Bears	United States	Traditional Animation
The Green Line	United States	Traditional Animation
Happy-Go-Nutty	United States	Traditional Animation
Hare Force	United States	Traditional Animation
Hare Ribbin'	United States	Traditional Animation
The Helicopter	United States	Traditional Animation
Hell-Bent for Election	United States	Traditional Animation
The Henpecked Rooster	United States	Traditional Animation
How to Play Football	United States	Traditional Animation
How to Play Golf	United States	Traditional Animation
Hullaba-Lulu	United States	Traditional Animation
I'm Just Curious	United States	Traditional Animation
Inflation	United States	Limited
It's Nifty to Be Thrifty	United States	Traditional Animation
Jasper Goes Hunting	United States	Stop-motion Animation
Kickapoo Juice	United States	Traditional Animation
A Lecture on Camouflage	United States	Traditional Animation
Lionel Lion	United States	Traditional Animation
Little Red Riding Rabbit	United States	Traditional Animation
Lost and Foundling	United States	Traditional Animation
Lucky Lulu	United States	Traditional Animation
Lulu at the Zoo	United States	Traditional Animation
Lulu Gets the Birdie	United States	Traditional Animation
Lulu in Hollywood	United States	Traditional Animation
Lulu's Birthday Party	United States	Traditional Animation
Lulu's Indoor Outing	United States	Traditional Animation
Magic Strength	United States	Traditional Animation
Meatless Flyday	United States	Traditional Animation
Mighty Mouse and the Two Barbers	United States	Traditional Animation
Mighty Mouse Meets Jekyll and Hyde Cat	United States	Traditional Animation
The Million Dollar Cat	United States	Traditional Animation
Mouse Trouble	United States	Traditional Animation
Moving Aweigh	United States	Traditional Animation
Mr. Fore by Fore	United States	Traditional Animation
Mutt 'n' Bones	United States	Traditional Animation
My Boy Johnny	United States	Traditional Animation
Les Noirs jouent et gagnent la révolte des notes	France	Traditional Animation
The Old Grey Hare	United States	Traditional Animation
Outpost	United States	Traditional Animation
The Painter and The Pointer	United States	Traditional Animation
Payday	United States	Traditional Animation
A Pee-kool-yar Sit-chee-ay-shun	United States	Traditional Animation
The Pelican and the Snipe	United States	Traditional Animation
Pitchin' Woo at the Zoo	United States	Traditional Animation
Plane Daffy	United States	Traditional Animation
The Plastics Inventor	United States	Traditional Animation
Polly Wants a Doctor	United States	Traditional Animation
Porkuliar Piggy	United States	Traditional Animation
Private Snafu vs. Malaria Mike	United States	Traditional Animation
Puppet Love	United States	Traditional Animation
Puttin' On the Dog	United States	Traditional Animation
Red Hot Riding Hood	United States	Traditional Animation
Russian Rhapsody	United States	Traditional Animation
Sadie Hawkins Day	United States	Traditional Animation
Der Schneemann	Germany	Traditional Animation
Screwball Squirrel	United States	Traditional Animation
She-Sick Sailors	United States	Traditional Animation
Ski for Two	United States	Traditional Animation
Slightly Daffy	United States	Traditional Animation
Snafuperman	United States	Traditional Animation
Spinach Packin' Popeye	United States	Traditional Animation
Springtime for Pluto	United States	Traditional Animation
Stage Door Cartoon	United States	Traditional Animation
The Stupid Cupid	United States	Traditional Animation
Suddenly It's Spring	United States	Traditional Animation
The Sultan's Birthday	United States	Traditional Animation
Swooner Crooner	United States	Traditional Animation
Tangled Travels	United States	Traditional Animation
Three Brothers	United States	Traditional Animation
Tick Tock Tuckered	United States	Traditional Animation
Tom Turk and Daffy	United States	Traditional Animation
Trombone Trouble	United States	Traditional Animation
The Weakly Reporter	United States	Traditional Animation
What's Cookin' Doc?	United States	Traditional Animation
We're On Our Way to Rio	United States	Traditional Animation
Wolf! Wolf!	United States	Traditional Animation
A Wolf's Tale	United States	Traditional Animation
The Wreck of the Hesperus	United States	Traditional Animation
Yankee Doodle Donkey	United States	Traditional Animation
The Zoot Cat	United States	Traditional Animation

== 1945 ==
Name	Country	Technique
Ain't That Ducky	United States	Traditional Animation
Ants in Your Pantry	United States	Traditional Animation
The Bashful Buzzard	United States	Traditional Animation
Beau Ties	United States	Traditional Animation
Behind the Meat-Ball	United States	Traditional Animation
Booby Socks	United States	Traditional Animation
Brotherhood of Man	United States	Traditional Animation
Chew-Chew Baby	United States	Traditional Animation
Cleaning Mess Gear	United States	Limited
The Clock Watcher	United States	Traditional Animation
Crow Crazy	United States	Traditional Animation
Cured Duck	United States	Traditional Animation
Daffydilly Daddy	United States	Traditional Animation
The Dippy Diplomat	United States	Traditional Animation
Donald's Crime	United States	Traditional Animation
Draftee Daffy	United States	Traditional Animation
Drinking Water	United States	Limited
Duck Pimples	United States	Traditional Animation
The Enemy Bacteria	United States	Traditional Animation
The Eyes Have It	United States	Traditional Animation
A Few Quick Facts About Fear	United States	Limited
Flirty Birdy	United States	Traditional Animation
The Fox and the Duck	United States	Traditional Animation
The Friendly Ghost	United States	Traditional Animation
The Good Egg	United States	Traditional Animation
Goofy News Views	United States	Traditional Animation
A Gruesome Twosome	United States	Traditional Animation
Hare Conditioned	United States	Traditional Animation
Hare Tonic	United States	Traditional Animation
Hare Trigger	United States	Traditional Animation
Herr Meets Hare	United States	Traditional Animation
Hockey Homicide	United States	Traditional Animation
Hot Spot	United States	Traditional Animation
In the Aleutians – Isles of Enchantment	United States	Traditional Animation
It's Murder She Says	United States	Traditional Animation
Japan	United States	Limited
Jasper and the Beanstalk	United States	Stop-motion Animation
Jerky Turkey	United States	Stop-motion Animation
Krakatoa	United States	Traditional Animation
A Lamb in a Jam	United States	Traditional Animation
Life with Feathers	United States	Traditional Animation
The Loose Nut	United States	Traditional Animation
Magica-Lulu	United States	Traditional Animation
Man's Pest Friend	United States	Traditional Animation
Mighty Mouse and the Pirates	United States	Traditional Animation
Mighty Mouse and the Wolf	United States	Traditional Animation
Mighty Mouse in Gypsy Life	United States	Traditional Animation
Mighty Mouse Meets Bad Bill Bunion	United States	Traditional Animation
The Mosquito	United States	Traditional Animation
The Mouse Comes to Dinner	United States	Traditional Animation
Mouse in Manhattan	United States	Traditional Animation
Nasty Quacks	United States	Traditional Animation
Native Food	United States	Limited
No Buddy Atoll	United States	Traditional Animation
No Sail	United States	Traditional Animation
Odor-able Kitty	United States	Traditional Animation
Old Sequoia	United States	Traditional Animation
Operation Snafu	United States	Traditional Animation
Personal Cleanliness	United States	Limited
The Poet and the Peasant	United States	Traditional Animation
Pop-Pie a la Mode	United States	Traditional Animation
The Port of Missing Mice	United States	Traditional Animation
Quiet Please!	United States	Traditional Animation
Raiding the Raiders	United States	Traditional Animation
The Return of Mr. Hook	United States	Traditional Animation
Rippling Romance	United States	Traditional Animation
Scrappily Married	United States	Traditional Animation
The Screwy Truant	United States	Traditional Animation
A Self-Made Mongrel	United States	Traditional Animation
The Shooting of Dan McGoo	United States	Traditional Animation
The Silver Streak	United States	Traditional Animation
Simple Siren	United States	Traditional Animation
Smoky Joe	United States	Traditional Animation
Snap Happy	United States	Traditional Animation
Svatba v korálovém moři	Czechoslovakia	Traditional Animation
Swing Shift Cinderella	United States	Traditional Animation
Taking Medicine	United States	Limited
Tale of Two Mice	United States	Traditional Animation
Tee for Two	United States	Traditional Animation
Tokyo Woes	United States	Traditional Animation
Trap Happy Porky	United States	Traditional Animation
The Unruly Hare	United States	Traditional Animation
The Unwelcome Guest	United States	Traditional Animation
Use Your Head	United States	Limited
Wagon Heels	United States	Traditional Animation
The Watchdog	United States	Traditional Animation
When G.I. Johnny Comes Home	United States	Traditional Animation
Wild and Woolfy	United States	Traditional Animation
Winky the Watchman	United States	Traditional Animation
Woody Dines Out	United States	Traditional Animation

== 1946 ==
Name	Country	Technique
The ABC of Hand Tools	United States	Traditional Animation
Acrobatty Bunny	United States	Traditional Animation
Apple Andy	United States	Traditional Animation
Baby Bottleneck	United States	Traditional Animation
Bargain Counter Attack	United States	Traditional Animation
Baseball Bugs	United States	Traditional Animation
Bath Day	United States	Traditional Animation
Bathing Buddies	United States	Traditional Animation
Bathing Time for Baby	United States	Traditional Animation
Beanstalk Jack	United States	Traditional Animation
The Big City	United Kingdom	Traditional Animation
The Big Snooze	United States	Traditional Animation
Book Revue	United States	Traditional Animation
Bored of Education	United States	Traditional Animation
The Building of a Tire	United States	Traditional Animation
Casey at the Bat	United States	Traditional Animation
Cheese Burglar	United States	Traditional Animation
Chick and Double Chick	United States	Traditional Animation
The Crackpot King	United States	Traditional Animation
Daffy Doodles	United States	Traditional Animation
Dinky Finds a Home	United States	Traditional Animation
Donald's Double Trouble	United States	Traditional Animation
Double Dribble	United States	Traditional Animation
Dumb Bell of the Yukon	United States	Traditional Animation
Easy Does It	United States	Traditional Animation
The Electronic Mouse Trap	United States	Traditional Animation
Environmental Sanitation	United States	Traditional Animation
Fair Weather Fiends	United States	Traditional Animation
A Feather in His Collar	United States	Traditional Animation
La Flûte magique	France	Traditional Animation
Fortune Hunters	United States	Traditional Animation
Frank Duck Brings 'Em Back Alive	United States	Traditional Animation
Fresh Airedale	United States	Traditional Animation
The Goal Rush	United States	Traditional Animation
The Golden Hen	United States	Traditional Animation
The Great Piggy Bank Robbery	United States	Traditional Animation
Hair-Raising Hare	United States	Traditional Animation
Hare Remover	United States	Traditional Animation
Henpecked Hoboes	United States	Traditional Animation
Hollywood Daffy	United States	Traditional Animation
The Housing Problem	United States	Traditional Animation
In Dutch	United States	Traditional Animation
It's All In the Stars	United States	Traditional Animation
The Jail Break	United States	Traditional Animation
Jasper in a Jam	United States	Stop-motion Animation
John Henry and the Inky-Poo	United States	Stop-motion Animation
Johnnie Fedora and Alice Bluebonnet	United States	Traditional Animation
The Johnstown Flood	United States	Traditional Animation
Kitty Kornered	United States	Traditional Animation
A Knight for a Day	United States	Traditional Animation
Kongo-Roo	United States	Traditional Animation
Lighthouse Keeping	United States	Traditional Animation
Lonesome Lenny	United States	Traditional Animation
The Martins and the Coys	United States	Traditional Animation
Mighty Mouse and the Hep Cat	United States	Traditional Animation
The Milky Waif	United States	Traditional Animation
Mother Goose Stories	United States	Stop-motion Animation
Mousie Come Home	United States	Traditional Animation
Musical Moments from Chopin	United States	Traditional Animation
My Old Kentucky Home	United States	Traditional Animation
Nasty Quacks	United States	Traditional Animation
Northwest Hounded Police	United States	Traditional Animation
Old MacDonald Had a Farm	United States	Traditional Animation
Peace-Time Football	United States	Traditional Animation
Peck Up Your Troubles	United States	Traditional Animation
Peter and the Wolf	United States	Traditional Animation
Planning for Good Eating	United States	Traditional Animation
The Poet & Peasant	United States	Traditional Animation
Pluto's Kid Brother	United States	Traditional Animation
Private Snafu Presents Seaman Tarfu in the Navy	United States	Traditional Animation
The Purloined Pup	United States	Traditional Animation
Racketeer Rabbit	United States	Traditional Animation
The Reckless Driver	United States	Traditional Animation
Rhapsodie de Saturne	France	Traditional Animation
Rhapsody Rabbit	United States	Traditional Animation
The Schooner the Better	United States	Traditional Animation
Sheep Shape	United States	Traditional Animation
Snap Happy Traps	United States	Traditional Animation
The Snow Man	United States	Traditional Animation
Solid Serenade	United States	Traditional Animation
Spree for All	United States	Traditional Animation
Springtime for Thomas	United States	Traditional Animation
Squatter's Rights	United States	Traditional Animation
The Story of Menstruation	United States	Traditional Animation
Sudden Fried Chicken	United States	Traditional Animation
Svengali's Cat	United States	Traditional Animation
The Talking Magpies	United States	Traditional Animation
Throwing the Bull	United States	Traditional Animation
Together in the Weather	United States	Stop-motion Animation
The Tortoise Wins Again	United States	Traditional Animation
Trap Happy	United States	Traditional Animation
Treasure from the Sea	United States	Traditional Animation
The Trojan Horse	United States	Traditional Animation
The Uninvited Pests	United States	Traditional Animation
The Wacky Weed	United States	Traditional Animation
Walky Talky Hawky	United States	Traditional Animation
Wet Paint	United States	Traditional Animation
Who's Cookin' Who?	United States	Traditional Animation
Willie the Operatic Whale	United States	Traditional Animation
The Wicked Wolf	United States	Traditional Animation
Winning the West	United States	Traditional Animation

== 1947 ==
Name	Country	Technique
Aladdin's Lamp	United States	Traditional Animation
Along Came Daffy	United States	Traditional Animation
The Baby Sitter	United States	Traditional Animation
The Bandmaster	United States	Traditional Animation
Big House Blues	United States	Traditional Animation
Birth of a Notion	United States	Traditional Animation
Bongo	United States	Traditional Animation
Bootle Beetle	United States	Traditional Animation
A Bout with a Trout	United States	Traditional Animation
Cad and Caddy	United States	Traditional Animation
The Cat Concerto	United States	Traditional Animation
Cat Fishin'	United States	Traditional Animation
Cat Trouble	United States	Traditional Animation
Catch as Cats Can	United States	Traditional Animation
Chip an' Dale	United States	Traditional Animation
The Circus Comes to Clown	United States	Traditional Animation
Clown of the Jungle	United States	Traditional Animation
Cockatoos for Two	United States	Traditional Animation
The Coo Coo Bird	United States	Traditional Animation
Crazy with the Heat	United States	Traditional Animation
Crowing Pains	United States	Traditional Animation
Crying Wolf	United States	Traditional Animation
A Date for Dinner	United States	Traditional Animation
The Dead End Cats	United States	Traditional Animation
Doggone Cats	United States	Traditional Animation
Donald's Dilemma	United States	Traditional Animation
Dr. Jekyll and Mr. Mouse	United States	Traditional Animation
Easter Yeggs	United States	Traditional Animation
The Enchanted Square	United States	Traditional Animation
A Fight to the Finish	United States	Traditional Animation
The First Snow	United States	Traditional Animation
Fishing By the Sea	United States	Traditional Animation
Flying South	United States	Traditional Animation
Foot Brawl	United States	Traditional Animation
Foul Hunting	United States	Traditional Animation
The Foxy Duckling	United States	Traditional Animation
Fun Fair	United Kingdom	Traditional Animation
The Gay Anties	United States	Traditional Animation
The Goofy Gophers	United States	Traditional Animation
Happy Go Lucky	United States	Traditional Animation
A Hare Grows in Manhattan	United States	Traditional Animation
The Hitch Hikers	United States	Traditional Animation
Hobo Bobo	United States	Traditional Animation
Hound Hunters	United States	Traditional Animation
A Horse Fly Fleas	United States	Traditional Animation
House Hunting Mice	United States	Traditional Animation
Inki at the Circus	United States	Traditional Animation
The Intruders	United States	Traditional Animation
The Invisible Mouse	United States	Traditional Animation
It's a Grand Old Nag	United States	Traditional Animation
King-Size Canary	United States	Traditional Animation
Kitty Caddy	United States	Traditional Animation
Lazy Little Beaver	United States	Traditional Animation
Leave Us Chase It	United States	Traditional Animation
Little Orphan Airedale	United States	Traditional Animation
Loose in the Caboose	United States	Traditional Animation
Madhattan Island	United States	Traditional Animation
McDougal's Rest Farm	United States	Traditional Animation
Mexican Joyride	United States	Traditional Animation
Mickey and the Beanstalk	United States	Traditional Animation
Mickey's Delayed Date	United States	Traditional Animation
Mighty Mouse Meets Deadeye Dick	United States	Traditional Animation
The Mild West	United States	Traditional Animation
Motion Painting No. 1	United States	Paint-on-glass
A Mouse in the House	United States	Traditional Animation
Much Ado About Mutton	United States	Traditional Animation
Musica-Lulu	United States	Traditional Animation
Musical Moments from Chopin	United States	Traditional Animation
Naughty but Mice	United States	Traditional Animation
Old Manor House	United Kingdom	Traditional Animation
One Meat Brawl	United States	Traditional Animation
Part Time Pal	United States	Traditional Animation
A Pest in the House	United States	Traditional Animation
Le petit Soldat	France	Traditional Animation
Pluto's Blue Note	United States	Traditional Animation
Popeye and the Pirates	United States	Traditional Animation
Rabbit Transit	United States	Traditional Animation
Red Hot Rangers	United States	Traditional Animation
Salt Water Tabby	United States	Traditional Animation
Santa's Surprise	United States	Traditional Animation
Scent-imental Over You	United States	Traditional Animation
A Scout with the Gout	United States	Traditional Animation
The Sky Is Falling	United States	Traditional Animation
Sleepy Time Donald	United States	Traditional Animation
Slick Hare	United States	Traditional Animation
Smoked Hams	United States	Traditional Animation
Solid Ivory	United States	Traditional Animation
Straight Shooters	United States	Traditional Animation
The Stupidstitious Cat	United States	Traditional Animation
Super Lulu	United States	Traditional Animation
The Super Salesman	United States	Traditional Animation
Swiss Cheese Family Robinson	United States	Traditional Animation
Tooth or Consequences	United States	Traditional Animation
Tubby the Tuba	United States	Stop-motion Animation
Tweetie Pie	United States	Traditional Animation
Uncle Tom's Cabaña	United States	Traditional Animation
The Uncultured Vulture	United States	Traditional Animation
Wacky Quacky	United States	Traditional Animation
The Wee Men	United States	Traditional Animation
The Way of Peace	United States	Stop-motion Animation
Well Oiled	United States	Traditional Animation
Wide Open Spaces	United States	Traditional Animation
The Wolf's Pardon	United States	Traditional Animation
Woody the Giant Killer	United States	Traditional Animation

== 1948 ==
Name	Country	Technique
A-Lad-In His Lamp	United States	Traditional Animation
Back Alley Oproar	United States	Traditional Animation
Banquet Busters	United States	Traditional Animation
Base Brawl	United States	Traditional Animation
The Bear and the Bean	United States	Traditional Animation
The Bear and the Hare	United States	Traditional Animation
The Big Wash	United States	Traditional Animation
Blame It on the Samba	United States	Traditional Animation
Bone Sweet Bone	United States	Traditional Animation
The Bored Cuckoo	United States	Traditional Animation
Buccaneer Bunny	United States	Traditional Animation
Bugs Bunny Rides Again	United States	Traditional Animation
Butterscotch and Soda	United States	Traditional Animation
Camptown Races	United States	Traditional Animation
Cat O' Nine Ails	United States	Traditional Animation
The Cat That Hated People	United States	Traditional Animation
The Chipper Chipmunk	United States	Traditional Animation
The Cuckoo	United Kingdom	Traditional Animation
Daddy Duck	United States	Traditional Animation
Daffy Dilly	United States	Traditional Animation
Daffy Duck Slept Here	United States	Traditional Animation
The Dog Show-Off	United States	Traditional Animation
Dog Tax Dodgers	United States	Traditional Animation
Donald's Dream Voice	United States	Traditional Animation
Dough Ray Me-ow	United States	Traditional Animation
Drip Dippy Donald	United States	Traditional Animation
A Feather in His Hare	United States	Traditional Animation
Felix the Fox	United States	Traditional Animation
The Feudin' Hillbillies	United States	Traditional Animation
Flip Flap	United States	Traditional Animation
Flora	United States	Traditional Animation
The Foghorn Leghorn	United States	Traditional Animation
Free Enterprise	United States	Traditional Animation
The Golden State	United States	Traditional Animation
Goony Golfers	United States	Traditional Animation
Gorilla My Dreams	United States	Traditional Animation
Half-Pint Pygmy	United States	Traditional Animation
Hare Splitter	United States	Traditional Animation
Haredevil Hare	United States	Traditional Animation
Hector's Hectic Life	United States	Traditional Animation
A Hick, a Slick, and a Chick	United States	Traditional Animation
Home Sweet Home	United Kingdom	Traditional Animation
Hop, Look and Listen	United States	Traditional Animation
Hot Cross Bunny	United States	Traditional Animation
Hounding the Hares	United States	Traditional Animation
The House-Cat (Felis Vulgaris)	United Kingdom	Traditional Animation
I Taw a Putty Tat	United States	Traditional Animation
Inferior Decorator	United States	Traditional Animation
Johnny Appleseed	United States	Traditional Animation
Kit for Cat	United States	Traditional Animation
Kitty Foiled	United States	Traditional Animation
The Land of the Lost	United States	Traditional Animation
The Lion (Felis Leo)	United Kingdom	Traditional Animation
Little Brown Jug	United States	Traditional Animation
Little 'Tinker	United States	Traditional Animation
Little Toot	United States	Traditional Animation
Lo, the Poor Buffal	United States	Traditional Animation
Loch Ness Legend	United Kingdom	Traditional Animation
The Lone Star State	United States	Traditional Animation
Loves Labor Won	United States	Traditional Animation
Little Ducky	United States	Traditional Animation
The Mad Hatter	United States	Traditional Animation
The Magic Slipper	United States	Traditional Animation
Magpie Madness	United States	Traditional Animation
Make Mine Freedom	United States	Traditional Animation
Mickey and the Seal	United States	Traditional Animation
Mickey Down Under	United States	Traditional Animation
Mighty Mouse and the Magician	United States	Traditional Animation
The Mite Makes Right	United States	Traditional Animation
Mouse Cleaning	United States	Traditional Animation
My Bunny Lies over the Sea	United States	Traditional Animation
The Mysterious Stranger	United States	Traditional Animation
Mystery in the Moonlight	United States	Traditional Animation
Nothing But the Tooth	United States	Traditional Animation
Odor of the Day	United States	Traditional Animation
Old Rockin' Chair Tom	United States	Traditional Animation
The Old Shell Game	United States	Traditional Animation
Olive Oyl for President	United States	Traditional Animation
Once Upon a Wintertime	United States	Traditional Animation
Out Again in Again	United States	Traditional Animation
Pecos Bill	United States	Traditional Animation
The Pest That Came to Dinner	United States	Traditional Animation
Pickled Puss	United States	Traditional Animation
Playful Pelican	United States	Traditional Animation
Popeye Meets Hercules	United States	Traditional Animation
Pre-Hysterical Man	United States	Traditional Animation
Professor Tom	United States	Traditional Animation
Rabbit Punch	United States	Traditional Animation
The Racket Buster	United States	Traditional Animation
The Rattled Rooster	United States	Traditional Animation
Readin', Ritin' and Rhythmetic	United States	Traditional Animation
Riff Raffy Daffy	United States	Traditional Animation
Robin Hoodlum	United States	Traditional Animation
Robin Hood-Winked	United States	Traditional Animation
Rudolph the Red-Nosed Reindeer	United States	Traditional Animation
Scaredy Cat	United States	Traditional Animation
Seeing Ghosts	United States	Traditional Animation
The Shell Shocked Egg	United States	Traditional Animation
Short Snorts on Sports	United States	Traditional Animation
Sing or Swim	United States	Traditional Animation
A Sleepless Night	United States	Traditional Animation
Snow Place Like Home	United States	Traditional Animation
Soup's On	United States	Traditional Animation
Spinach vs Hamburgers	United States	Traditional Animation
The Stupor Salesman	United States	Traditional Animation
Symphony in Spinach	United States	Traditional Animation
Taming the Cat	United States	Traditional Animation
Tea for Two Hundred	United States	Traditional Animation
The Thames	United Kingdom	Traditional Animation
There's Good Boos To-Night	United States	Traditional Animation
They're Off	United States	Traditional Animation
Three for Breakfast	United States	Traditional Animation
Topsy Turkey	United States	Traditional Animation
The Trial of Donald Duck	United States	Traditional Animation
The Truce Hurts	United States	Traditional Animation
Two Gophers from Texas	United States	Traditional Animation
The Up-Standing Sitter	United States	Traditional Animation
Wacky-Bye Baby	United States	Traditional Animation
Wales	United Kingdom	Traditional Animation
We're in the Honey	United States	Traditional Animation
Wet Blanket Policy	United States	Traditional Animation
What Makes Daffy Duck	United States	Traditional Animation
What Price Fleadom?	United States	Traditional Animation
What's Brewin', Bruin?	United States	Traditional Animation
Wigwam Whoopee	United States	Traditional Animation
Wild and Woody!	United States	Traditional Animation
Winter Draws On	United States	Traditional Animation
The Witch's Cat	United States	Traditional Animation
A Wolf in Sheik's Clothing	United States	Traditional Animation
You Were Never Duckier	United States	Traditional Animation

== 1949 ==
Name	Country	Technique
All in a Nutshell	United States	Traditional Animation
Awful Orphan	United States	Traditional Animation
Bad Luck Blackie	United States	Traditional Animation
Bad Ol' Putty Tat	United States	Traditional Animation
A Balmy Swami	United States	Traditional Animation
Barking Dogs Don't Fite	United States	Traditional Animation
Bear Feat	United States	Traditional Animation
The Bee-Deviled Bruin	United States	Traditional Animation
Begone Dull Care	Canada	Traditional Animation
The Big Drip	United States	Traditional Animation
The Big Flame Up	United States	Traditional Animation
Big Tim	United States	Traditional Animation
Bowery Bugs	United States	Traditional Animation
Bubble Bee	United States	Traditional Animation
Bye, Bye Bluebeard	United States	Traditional Animation
Campus Capers	United States	Traditional Animation
Canary Row	United States	Traditional Animation
The Cat and the Mermouse	United States	Traditional Animation
The Catnip Gang	United States	Traditional Animation
Cat-Tastrophy	United States	Traditional Animation
A Cold Romance	United States	Traditional Animation
Comin' Round the Mountain	United States	Traditional Animation
The Coo-Coo Bird Dog	United States	Traditional Animation
The Counterfeit Cat	United States	Traditional Animation
Curtain Razor	United States	Traditional Animation
Daffy Duck Hunt	United States	Traditional Animation
Dancing Shoes	United States	Traditional Animation
Dingbat Land	United States	Traditional Animation
Donald's Happy Birthday	United States	Traditional Animation
Dough for the Do-Do	United States	Traditional Animation
Drooler's Delight	United States	Traditional Animation
Each Dawn I Crow	United States	Traditional Animation
The Emerald Isle	United States	Traditional Animation
Farm Foolery	United States	Traditional Animation
Fast and Furry-ous	United States	Traditional Animation
The Fly's Last Flight	United States	Traditional Animation
Flying Cups and Saucers	United States	Traditional Animation
For Scent-imental Reasons	United States	Traditional Animation
Frigid Hare	United States	Traditional Animation
The Funshine State	United States	Traditional Animation
Gauche the Cellist	Japan	Anime
Goggle Fishing Bear	United States	Traditional Animation
Goofy Gymnastics	United States	Traditional Animation
Grape Nutty	United States	Traditional Animation
The Greener Yard	United States	Traditional Animation
The Grey Hounded Hare	United States	Traditional Animation
A Ham in a Role	United States	Traditional Animation
Happy Landing	United States	Traditional Animation
Hare Do	United States	Traditional Animation
Hatch Up Your Troubles	United States	Traditional Animation
A Haunting We Will Go	United States	Traditional Animation
Heavenly Puss	United States	Traditional Animation
Henhouse Henery	United States	Traditional Animation
Hep Cat Symphony	United States	Traditional Animation
High Diving Hare	United States	Traditional Animation
Hippety Hopper	United States	Traditional Animation
Holiday for Drumsticks	United States	Traditional Animation
Honey Harvester	United States	Traditional Animation
Hot Air Aces	United States	Traditional Animation
The House of Tomorrow	United States	Traditional Animation
Hula Hula Land	United States	Traditional Animation
Jerry's Diary	United States	Traditional Animation
The Kitten Sitter	United States	Traditional Animation
Knights Must Fall	United States	Traditional Animation
The Legend of Sleepy Hollow	United States	Traditional Animation
Leprechauns Gold	United States	Traditional Animation
The Lion Hunt	United States	Traditional Animation
The Little Cut-Up	United States	Traditional Animation
The Little Orphan	United States	Traditional Animation
Little Red School Mouse	United States	Traditional Animation
Little Rural Riding Hood	United States	Traditional Animation
Long-Haired Hare	United States	Traditional Animation
The Lost Dream	United States	Traditional Animation
Love That Pup	United States	Traditional Animation
Lumberjack and Jill	United States	Traditional Animation
The Lyin' Lion	United States	Traditional Animation
The Magic Fluke	United States	Traditional Animation
Marriage Wows	United States	Traditional Animation
Meet King Joe	United States	Traditional Animation
Mississippi Hare	United States	Traditional Animation
Monsieur Tout-le-Monde	France	Traditional Animation
Mouse Mazurka	United States	Traditional Animation
Mouse Wreckers	United States	Traditional Animation
Mrs. Jones' Rest Farm	United States	Traditional Animation
A Mutt in a Rut	United States	Traditional Animation
Often an Orphan	United States	Traditional Animation
Our Funny Finny Friends	United States	Traditional Animation
Out-Foxed	United States	Traditional Animation
Paint Pot Symphony	United States	Traditional Animation
Paying the Piper	United States	Traditional Animation
The Perils of Pearl Pureheart	United States	Traditional Animation
Pluto's Surprise Package	United States	Traditional Animation
Pluto's Sweater	United States	Traditional Animation
Polka-Dot Puss	United States	Traditional Animation
Popeye's Premiere	United States	Traditional Animation
Porky Chops	United States	Traditional Animation
The Power of Thought	United States	Traditional Animation
Pueblo Pluto	United States	Traditional Animation
Rabbit Hood	United States	Traditional Animation
The Ragtime Bear	United States	Traditional Animation
Rebel Rabbit	United States	Traditional Animation
The Sailor and the Seagull	United States	Traditional Animation
Scrappy Birthday	United States	Traditional Animation
Sea Salts	United States	Traditional Animation
Señor Droopy	United States	Traditional Animation
Sheep Dog	United States	Traditional Animation
Silly Hillbilly	United States	Traditional Animation
The Ski's the Limit	United States	Traditional Animation
Slide, Donald, Slide	United States	Traditional Animation
Snow Foolin'	United States	Traditional Animation
So Much for So Little	United States	Traditional Animation
Song of the Birds	United States	Traditional Animation
Spring Song	United States	Traditional Animation
Stop, Look and Listen	United States	Traditional Animation
The Stork Market	United States	Traditional Animation
The Story of Little Red Riding Hood	United States	Stop-motion Animation
The Stowaways	United States	Traditional Animation
Strolling Thru the Park	United States	Traditional Animation
Swallow the Leader	United States	Traditional Animation
Tar with a Star	United States	Traditional Animation
Tennis Chumps	United States	Traditional Animation
Tennis Racquet	United States	Traditional Animation
Toy Tinkers	United States	Traditional Animation
Toys Will Be Toys	United States	Traditional Animation
A Truckload of Trouble	United States	Traditional Animation
Wags to Riches	United States	Traditional Animation
Which Is Witch	United States	Traditional Animation
Why Play Leap Frog?	United States	Traditional Animation
Wind in the Willows	United States	Traditional Animation
The Windblown Hare	United States	Traditional Animation
Winter Storage	United States	Traditional Animation
Wise Quackers	United States	Traditional Animation
The Wooden Indian	United States	Traditional Animation
