= Andy Panda filmography =

Andy Panda
- Created by: Walter Lantz; Alex Lovy
- Original work: Life Begins for Andy Panda (1939)
- Owner: Walter Lantz Productions
- Years: 1939–1949; 1951–2022

Print publications
- Comics: Dell Comics

Films and television
- Short film(s): Life Begins for Andy Panda (1939); Andy Panda Goes Fishing (1940); Knock Knock (1940)
- Web series: Woody Woodpecker (2018–2022)
- Animated series: The Woody Woodpecker Show (1957–1997); The New Woody Woodpecker Show (1999–2002)
- Direct-to-video: List below

This is a list of Walter Lantz "Cartunes" featuring Andy Panda. All are entries in Lantz's Andy Panda series, except for $21 a Day (Once a Month) (a Swing Symphony cartoon), Musical Moments from Chopin (a Musical Miniatures cartoon), and Banquet Busters and The Woody Woodpecker Polka, two Woody Woodpecker cartoons.

Directors for each short are noted. Several Andy Panda cartoons produced in 1940, 1941, and 1942 carry no director credit; Walter Lantz claims to have directed these shorts himself. Six Andy Panda cartoons (Life Begins for Andy Panda, Knock Knock, Fish Fry, Apple Andy, The Bandmaster, and Scrappy Birthday) along with Musical Moments from Chopin and Banquet Busters were released in The Woody Woodpecker and Friends Classic Cartoon Collection.

== 1939 ==
#	Title	Date	Director	Notes
1	Life Begins for Andy Panda	October 9	Alex Lovy	First appearance of Andy Panda.; First Andy short directed by Alex Lovy.

== 1940 ==
#	Title	Date	Director	Notes
2	Andy Panda Goes Fishing	January 22	Burt Gillett	Only Andy short directed by Burt Gillett.
3	100 Pygmies and Andy Panda	April 22	Alex Lovy	Final appearance of Mr. Whippletree.
4	Crazy House	September 23	Walter Lantz	First Andy short directed by Walter Lantz.
5	Knock Knock	November 25	Walter Lantz	First appearance of Woody Woodpecker.

== 1941 ==
#	Title	Date	Director	Notes
6	Mouse Trappers	January 27	Alex Lovy	Last cartoon with Sara Berner as Andy Panda.
7	Dizzy Kitty	May 26	Walter Lantz	
N/A	Andy Panda's Pop	July 28	Alex Lovy	A cartoon short reissued as Goofy Roofer for television, "Cartune" short.
N/A	$21 a Day (Once a Month)	December 1	Walter Lantz	Swing Symphony short.

== 1942 ==
#	Title	Date	Director	Notes
8	Under the Spreading Blacksmith Shop	January 12	Alex Lovy	Final appearance of Poppa Panda. First cartoon with Margaret Hill-Talbot as Andy Panda.
9	Good-Bye Mr. Moth	May 11	Walter Lantz	
10	Nutty Pine Cabin	June 1	Alex Lovy	First appearance of Andy Panda as an adult.
11	Andy Panda's Victory Garden	September 7	Alex Lovy	First appearance of Charlie Chicken.
12	Air Raid Warden	December 21	Alex Lovy	Last cartoon with Margaret Hill-Talbot as Andy Panda.

== 1943 ==
#	Title	Date	Director	Notes
13	Canine Commandos	June 28	Alex Lovy	Final Andy short directed by Alex Lovy.
14	Meatless Tuesday	October 25	James Culhane	First Andy short directed by James Culhane.

== 1944 ==
#	Title	Date	Director	Notes
15	Fish Fry	June 19	James Culhane	
16	The Painter and The Pointer	December 18	James Culhane	First cartoon with Walter Tetley as Andy Panda.

== 1945 ==
#	Title	Date	Director	Notes
17	Crow Crazy	July 9	Dick Lundy	First appearance of Milo.; First Andy short directed by Dick Lundy.

== 1946 ==
#	Title	Date	Director	Notes
18	The Poet and Peasant	March 18	Dick Lundy	
19	Mousie Come Home	April 15	James Culhane	Final Andy short directed by James Culhane.
20	Apple Andy	May 20	Dick Lundy	Featured song performed by Del Porter.
21	The Wacky Weed	December 16	Dick Lundy	Final Andy short distributed by Universal Pictures.

== 1947 ==
#	Title	Date	Director	Notes
N/A	Musical Moments from Chopin	February 24	Dick Lundy	Musical Miniatures short.
N/A	Well Oiled	June 30	Dick Lundy	Woody Woodpecker short.; Andy Panda makes a cameo appearance in a billboard.
22	The Bandmaster	December 22	Dick Lundy	First Andy short distributed by United Artists.

== 1948 ==
#	Title	Date	Director	Notes
N/A	Banquet Busters	March 3	Dick Lundy	Woody Woodpecker short.
N/A	Wet Blanket Policy	August 27	Dick Lundy	Woody Woodpecker short.; Andy Panda makes a cameo appearance in an advertisement.
23	Playful Pelican	October 8	Dick Lundy	
24	Dog Tax Dodgers	November 19	Dick Lundy	Only appearance of Wally Walrus in an Andy Panda short.

== 1949 ==
#	Title	Date	Director	Notes
25	Scrappy Birthday	February 11	Dick Lundy	First and only appearance of Miranda Panda.; The last Andy Panda short directed by Dick Lundy.; The last Andy Panda short distributed by United Artists.

== 1951 ==
#	Title	Date	Director	Notes
N/A	The Woody Woodpecker Polka	October 29	Walter Lantz	Final appearance of Andy Panda, even though he appears multiple times in one scene. This is a Woody Woodpecker short.
