= Fish Fry (film) =

Andy Panda cartoon

- Directed by: James Culhane
- Story by: Ben Hardaway; Milt Schaffer
- Produced by: Walter Lantz
- Music by: Musical direction: Darrell Calker
- Animation by: Laverne Harding; Emery Hawkins; Uncredited animation: Pat Matthews; Les Kline; Paul Smith; Dick Lundy; Milt Schaffer; Don Williams
- Layouts by: Art Heineman
- Backgrounds by: Philip DeGuard
- Color process: Technicolor
- Production company: Walter Lantz Productions
- Distributed by: Universal Pictures
- Release date: June 19, 1944
- Running time: 6 minutes
- Country: United States
- Language: English

Fish Fry is a 1944 Andy Panda cartoon directed by James Culhane and produced by Walter Lantz Productions. The plot centers around a street cat's endless attempts to eat Andy's goldfish after ordering it from a pet shop.

== Plot ==
Andy Panda is captivated by a cute little goldfish in a pet shop window. He buys it and begins to take it home, but he is stalked by a mangy, hungry alley cat that wants to eat the fish. The cat attempts to catch the fish by sneaking up and grabbing it, then by disguising itself as a parched desert traveler, and finally by resorting to crude yet effective brute force. In his haste, the cat loses the fish down a gutter, retrieves it, and then loses it again while trying to cook it. After escaping from a cement mixer into which he was kicked, Andy catches the fish and is promptly chased back to the pet shop. The cat's ambush outside the shop is thwarted by a large bulldog at Andy's side, who disposes of the cat without raising an eyebrow.

== Notes ==
- Production Number: D-6
- The cartoon was nominated for the 1944 Academy Award for Best Animated Short Film, but lost to MGM's Mouse Trouble, starring Tom and Jerry.
