= Crazy House (1940 film) =

- Directed by: Walter Lantz (uncredited)
- Story by: Ben Hardaway (uncredited)
- Produced by: Walter Lantz
- Starring: Sara Berner; Danny Webb; Walter Lantz (all uncredited)
- Music by: Frank Marsales (uncredited)
- Animation by: Alex Lovy; Laverne Harding; Les Kline; George Dane; Ray Fahringer; Frank Tipper (all uncredited)
- Backgrounds by: Ed Kiechle (uncredited)
- Color process: Technicolor
- Production company: Walter Lantz Productions
- Distributed by: Universal Pictures
- Release date: September 23, 1940
- Running time: 8 minutes
- Country: United States
- Language: English

Crazy House is the fourth Andy Panda cartoon directed and produced by Walter Lantz. The cartoon was released on September 23, 1940.

== Plot ==
Andy and his father seek shelter from a flood in an abandoned building, which in reality is a funhouse, filled with such things as hidden practical jokes, a noisy merry-go-round and a dancing floor.

== Notes ==
- The cartoon is recognized as Lantz's first fully independent film. In early 1940, Universal Pictures, which was facing severe financial problems, decided to cut Lantz's weekly advance, forcing the producer to shut down the studio for a while. Crazy House was produced during the closure, as Lantz managed to gain full rights to the studio's characters in case Universal had been unable to keep distributing the cartoons.
