= Lou Lilly =

American animator, screenwriter and director

Louie Haskall Lilly (February 26, 1909 – August 9, 1999) was an American animator, screenwriter and director best known for his work on the Looney Tunes and Merrie Melodies series of cartoons from Warner Bros.

== Awards ==
- 1985 Golden Award

== Filmography ==
- 1947 Doctor Jim
- 1945 Draftee Daffy
- 1944 Angel Puss
- 1942 The Wild and Woozy West
- 1942 Horton Hatches the Egg
- 1941 The Merry Mouse Cafe
- 1941 Dumb Like a Fox
- 1941 Kitty Gets the Bird
- 1941 It Happened to Crusoe
- 1940 Mouse Meets Lion
- 1940 Farmer Tom Thumb
- 1940 A Peep in the Deep
- 1940 The Pooch Parade
- 1939 Park Your Baby
- 1939 The Little Lost Sheep
- 1939 Golf Chumps
- 1938 The Lone Mountie
- 1938 Hot Dogs on Ice

== Writer ==
- 1951 Front Page Detective
- 1947 Doctor Jim
- 1946 Speaking of Animals No. Y6-1: Stork Crazy
- 1946 The Lonesome Stranger
- 1945 Draftee Daffy
- 1944 Buckaroo Bugs
- 1944 Hare Ribbin'
- 1944 Angel Puss (One of the Censored Eleven)
- 1944 Russian Rhapsody

== Director ==
- 1946 Speaking of Animals No. Y6-1: Stork Crazy
- 1946 The Lonesome Stranger
- 1944 Who's Who in Animal Land
- 1942 The Wild and Woozy West
- 1941 Speaking of Animals Down on the Farm
- 1941 Playing the Pied Piper
