= The Egg Cracker Suite =

- Title card
- Directed by: Ben Hardaway; Emery Hawkins
- Story by: Milt Schaffer
- Produced by: Walter Lantz
- Starring: June Foray; Dorothy Lloyd (both unc.)
- Music by: Darrell Calker
- Animation by: Lester Kline
- Production company: Walter Lantz Productions
- Distributed by: Universal Pictures
- Release date: March 22, 1943
- Running time: 7 minutes
- Language: English

The Egg Cracker Suite is a 1943 Easter-themed animated short produced by Walter Lantz, co-directed by Ben Hardaway and Emery Hawkins (also a character designer) and animated by Les Kline (solely credited as Lester Kline), Laverne Harding and Paul J. Smith (both uncredited) that features a redesigned Oswald the Lucky Rabbit. This is the last animated short to feature Oswald until Get a Horse! in 2013.

== Plot ==
Oswald leads a line of rabbits, anchored by a small brown bunny, into Bunnyville, where they are to ready Easter baskets for the holiday. He enters one tree, which is a hen house dubbed "Egg Plant No. 1", and conducts them in a symphony to get them to lay eggs. Outside, each rabbit in the line gets an egg. Oswald finishes the symphony getting the lone ostrich to lay her huge egg, which as luck would have it, the small brown bunny winds up with.

The rest of the cartoon involves the creation of the Easter baskets. One rabbit hard boils the eggs, finds one spoiled, and rings for it to be taken away by the health department truck. The next scene shows rabbits making egg dye with plant and flower leaves. In the next scene, one rabbit is painting designs on eggs, but one egg hatches as he is painting it. He paints the chick instead, which causes the chick to yell in a fast chipmunk voice and paint the rabbit's face in retaliation.

The subsequent scene revisits the small brown bunny with the ostrich egg. Cheerfully pushing it toward a large vat of egg dye, the bunny struggles to push it up and over the plank. He tries running back to get more momentum, but when the egg falls into the vat, the plank collapses and the bunny crashes into the vat's side.

Next, rabbits are carrying baskets on wheelbarrows to first be filled with grass, then one egg surrounded by candy eggs, then each topped with a blue bow. They then take them to Bunnyville Airport where they are loaded into planes resembling B-18 bombers. As they ready for takeoff, the small brown bunny is shown running with the ostrich egg towards a plane, but the egg hatches before he can get there and the newborn ostrich that came out picks him up and throws him into a plane.

The planes take off one by one and are seen flying in formation when they open their bomb bay doors and drop the baskets all over the country. The bows open up like parachutes to slow their fall. The final scene is an apparently empty basket falling, but the brown bunny pops up and looks down initially horrified, but then his bow opens up and he relaxes then he waves to all of the viewers as the cartoon ends.

== See also ==
- List of Easter films
- Funny Little Bunnies
