= The Little Lost Sheep =

- Directed by: Allen Rose
- Produced by: Charles Mintz
- Starring: Danny Webb; Sara Berner
- Music by: Joe DeNat
- Animation by: Harry Love; Louie Lilly
- Color process: Black and white
- Production company: Charles Mintz Studio
- Distributed by: Columbia Pictures
- Release date: October 2, 1939
- Running time: 6:40
- Language: English

The Little Lost Sheep is a 1939 short animated film produced by Columbia Pictures. It is one of the two penultimate films in the Krazy Kat series, the other being Krazy's Shoe Shop, as both were released on the same day. Despite starring Krazy Kat, this is the first installment in the Fables series.

== Plot ==
A lady shepherd owns dozens of lambs. She even runs a school where she teaches them. One day, while giving roll call in a class, she notices one of her lambs is missing. She then abandons her teaching session, and goes out to find the lost one.

Out in the open, the missing lamb is playing with some blossoms instead of attending school. She is momentarily spotted by a jackal in a luxury car. To deceive the lamb, the jackal, disguised as a person in a mask, greets and offers her a ride, but the lamb is uninterested and just walks away. In his second plan, the jackal dresses as a sheep and carries a picnic basket. He then asks the lamb if she would like to come along. This time the lamb accepts.

Meanwhile, the lady shepherd, after being unable to locate her lamb, comes to a detective agency owned by Krazy Kat. When he hears about her problem, Krazy takes out a pair of hounds, and sets off.

Up on a hill in the open, the missing lamb and the jackal, who is still in his sheep disguise, are having their "picnic". Eventually, Krazy and the hounds come to the scene. Krazy warns the lamb that her companion is actually a vicious jackal. When the lamb is doubtful of the idea, the hounds rush forth at the impostor sheep, tearing up his disguise. Upon getting exposed, the jackal quickly picks up the lamb, and flees in a nearby car. Krazy and the hounds go on a chase and struggle to rescue the lamb. Moments later, the agitated lamb strikes the jackal who then loses control, causing both of them to be thrown out of the car. Before he could do anything else, the jackal is tackled by the hounds.

Krazy returns to the lady shepherd's school, dragging the jackal with him. The other lambs celebrate his deed in cheering him on.

== See also ==
- Krazy Kat filmography
