= Swing Symphony =

American animated film series

- The title card used from 1942 to 1945
- Produced by: Walter Lantz
- Music by: Darrell Calker
- Color process: Technicolor
- Production companies: Walter Lantz Productions; Universal Studios
- Distributed by: Universal Pictures
- Running time: 7 minutes
- Country: United States
- Language: English

Swing Symphony is an American animated musical short film series produced by Walter Lantz Productions from 1941 to 1945. The shorts were a more contemporary pastiche on Walt Disney's Silly Symphonies, and often featured top boogie-woogie musicians of the era.

The series mainly features a variety of different characters created exclusively for these shorts, although cameos by Woody Woodpecker and Andy Panda do appear in the first cartoon. Oswald the Lucky Rabbit also made an appearance in one short as well.

== Background ==
Walter Lantz Productions first developed the format with the cartoon Scrub Me Mama with a Boogie Beat, released on March 28, 1941. The short is considered a precursor as it contains many elements seen in the series, such as utilizing a popular swing song at the time. Lantz also produced Boogie Woogie Bugle Boy of Company 'B' later in September which followed the same formula and would be nominated for an Academy Award. The first cartoon that would go under Swing Symphony would not be released until December of that year.

One of the main writers that worked on the series was Ben Hardaway, who left Warner Bros. in 1940 and was hired by Walter Lantz to work on the storyboards for Universal Studios' cartoons. From 1938 to 1940, Hardaway was notably one of the last holdouts to co-direct several Merrie Melodies cartoons that featured lengthy musical sequences. He also supplied his voice for Woody Woodpecker in 1944 until 1949. Darrell Calker, who was involved in jazz circles, composed the music and brought in famous musicians like Nat King Cole, Meade Lux Lewis and Jack Teagarden to play them. Pianist Bob Zurke did a recording for the cartoon Jungle Jive before he died aged 32.

In 1942, Juke Box Jamboree was nominated for an Academy Award for Best Animated Short Film but lost to Disney's Der Fuehrer's Face. Few of Lantz's cartoons were highlighted for stereotyping and racism, but were said by Joe Adamson as not intended to be offensive.

The series was discontinued in 1945 due to swing music fading in popularity following the end of World War II. Dick Lundy, who directed the last Swing Symphony cartoon, later developed Musical Miniatures, a musical series focusing on classical music. Four cartoons were produced in 1947–1948.

== Filmography ==
#	Title	Directed by	Written by	Drawn by (animator)	Characters	Release date	Availability
1	$21 a Day (Once a Month)	Walter Lantz	Lowell Elliot; Ben Hardaway	Alex Lovy; Frank Tipper	Woody Woodpecker; Andy Panda	December 1, 1941	DVD - The Woody Woodpecker and Friends Classic Cartoon Collection
2	The Hams That Couldn't Be Cured	Walter Lantz	Lowell Elliot; Ben Hardaway	Alex Lovy; R. Somerville	Algernon Wolf; Three Little Pigs	March 4, 1942	DVD - The Woody Woodpecker and Friends Classic Cartoon Collection: Volume 2
3	Juke Box Jamboree	Alex Lovy	Ben Hardaway; Chuck Couch	Laverne Harding		July 27, 1942	DVD - The Woody Woodpecker and Friends Classic Cartoon Collection: Volume 2
4	Yankee Doodle Swing Shift	Alex Lovy	Ben Hardaway; Milt Schaffer	Harold Mason		September 21, 1942	
5	Boogie Woogie Sioux	Alex Lovy	Ben Hardaway; Milt Schaffer	Robert Bentley		November 30, 1942	DVD - Woody Woodpecker and Friends: Volume 5
6	Cow-Cow Boogie	Alex Lovy	Ben Hardaway; Milt Schaffer	Harold Mason		January 3, 1943	
7	The Egg Cracker Suite	Emery Hawkins; Ben Hardaway	Milt Schaffer	Les Kline	Oswald the Lucky Rabbit	March 22, 1943	DVD - Woody Woodpecker and Friends: Volume 3
8	Swing Your Partner	Alex Lovy	Ben Hardaway; Milt Schaffer	Paul J. Smith	Homer Pigeon	April 26, 1943	DVD - Woody Woodpecker and Friends: Volume 4
9	Pass The Biscuits Mirandy!	James Culhane	Ben Hardaway; Milt Schaffer	Paul Smith	Mirandy; The Foys and Bartons	August 23, 1943	DVD - The Woody Woodpecker and Friends Classic Cartoon Collection
10	Boogie Woogie Man; Will Get You If You Don't Watch Out	James Culhane	Ben Hardaway; Milt Schaffer	Laverne Harding; Les Kline	Boogie Woogie	September 27, 1943	DVD - The Woody Woodpecker and Friends Classic Cartoon Collection: Volume 2
11	The Greatest Man In Siam	James Culhane	Ben Hardaway; Milt Schaffer	Pat Matthews; Emery Hawkins	Miss X	March 27, 1944	DVD - The Woody Woodpecker and Friends Classic Cartoon Collection
12	Jungle Jive	James Culhane	Ben Hardaway; Milt Schaffer	Paul J. Smith; Emery Hawkins		May 15, 1944	DVD - Woody Woodpecker and Friends: Volume 6
13	Abou Ben Boogie	James Culhane	Ben Hardaway; Milt Schaffer	Paul J. Smith; Pat Matthews	Miss X	September 18, 1944	DVD - The Woody Woodpecker and Friends Classic Cartoon Collection
14	The Pied Piper Of Basin Street	James Culhane	Ben Hardaway; Milt Schaffer	Laverne Harding; Pat Matthews	The Pied Piper	January 15, 1945	DVD - The Woody Woodpecker and Friends Classic Cartoon Collection
15	Sliphorn King Of Polaroo	Dick Lundy	Ben Hardaway; Milt Schaffer	Pat Matthews	Jackson	March 19, 1945	DVD - Woody Woodpecker and Friends: Volume 4

=== Musical Miniatures ===
#	Title	Directed by	Written by	Drawn by (animator)	Characters	Release date	Availability
1	Musical Moments from Chopin	Dick Lundy	Ben Hardaway, Milt Schaffer	Laverne Harding, Les Kline	Andy Panda, Woody Woodpecker	February 24, 1947	DVD - The Woody Woodpecker and Friends Classic Cartoon Collection
2	The Overture to William Tell	Dick Lundy	Ben Hardaway, Milt Schaffer	Laverne Harding, S.C. Onaitis	Wally Walrus	June 16, 1947	DVD - The Woody Woodpecker and Friends Classic Cartoon Collection: Volume 2
3	Kiddie Koncert	Dick Lundy	Ben Hardaway, Jack Cosgriff	Ed Love, Sidney Pillet	Wally Walrus	April 21, 1948	
4	Pixie Picnic	Dick Lundy	Ben Hardaway, Jack Cosgriff	Laverne Harding, Fred Moore	Pixies	May 28, 1948	DVD - The Woody Woodpecker and Friends Classic Cartoon Collection: Volume 2

== See also ==
- Walter Lantz Productions
- Silly Symphony
