= Bubble and Squeak =

Bubble and squeak is a British dish made from cooked potatoes and cabbage.

Bubble and Squeak may also refer to:

- Bubble and Squeak (video game), a 1994 video game
- Bubble and Squeak (EP), a 1996 album
- Bubble and Squeek, a 1946 cartoon series
- Bubble & Squeak (film), a 2025 American drama film
