= Meatless Tuesday =

- Title card
- Directed by: James Culhane
- Story by: Ben Hardaway; Milt Schaffer
- Produced by: Walter Lantz
- Music by: Darrell Calker
- Animation by: Paul Smith; Pat Matthews; Laverne Harding (unc.); Les Kline (unc.); Paul Busch (unc.); Rudy Zamora (unc.)
- Backgrounds by: Philip DeGuard (unc.)
- Color process: Technicolor
- Production company: Walter Lantz Productions
- Distributed by: Universal Pictures
- Release date: October 25, 1943
- Running time: 7 minutes
- Country: United States
- Language: English

Meatless Tuesday is a 1943 Andy Panda cartoon directed by James Culhane, and was released on October 25, 1943. It was produced by Walter Lantz Productions and distributed by Universal Pictures.

The title refers to Meatless Monday, which was a prominent campaign during World War II that encouraged people to ration meat and other goods during the war.

== Plot ==
Taking place entirely in pantomime, Andy Panda is going through a cookbook looking for something to prepare on a Meatless Tuesday when he hears a rooster crow outside, giving him the idea to make roast chicken for supper. Unfortunately, the farmyard rooster is far from cooperative, as Andy pursues him to a chicken coop, in which the rooster locks himself. Andy tries a few methods to get the rooster out, such as using bird seeds as bait and prying the coop door open, but none of them appear to work. Andy then uses a shovel to dig his way into the coop, but the rooster and the other hens re-position the coop above a fountain, causing Andy to be spit out of the earth and into his cellar.

Andy emerges from the cellar with an axe and begins chasing the rooster once more. He eventually catches up with him and prepares to sever his head from his neck, but he hesitates. The rooster responds by putting a blindfold on Andy, who then proceeds to hack off his head, but the axe blade, however, flies off the handle and lands on the neck of the rooster. With the upper hand, the rooster pursues Andy up a telephone pole, which he then chops down, causing it to crash into Andy's garden. The rooster lets out one more victorious crow, only to be pelted with a tomato by Andy in return.

== Home media ==
- Walter Lantz Presents: The World of Andy Panda (VHS; Universal/MCA)
- Woody Woodpecker and Friends: Volume 6 (DVD; Columbia House)
