= Emery Hawkins =

American animator (1912–1989)

- Born: Emery Otis Hawkins; April 30, 1912; Jerome, Arizona, U.S.
- Died: June 1, 1989 (aged 77); Taos, New Mexico, U.S.
- Other name: Emory Hawkins
- Occupations: Animator, Director
- Years active: 1935–1982
- Employer(s): The Charles Mintz Studio/Screen Gems (1932–1937, 1941–1942); MGM (1937–1938); Walt Disney Productions (1938–1941, 1942, 1945–1946); Walter Lantz Productions (1942–1945); Warner Bros. Cartoons (1946–1950); John Sutherland Productions (1950–1959); Dibujos Animados (1953–1954); Richard Williams Productions (1975–1982)
- Spouses: Mary Angeline Felton (m. 1938; div. 1959) Odette Alice Flood (m. 1959)
- Children: 3

Emery Otis Hawkins (April 30, 1912 – June 1, 1989) was an American animator, best known for his work during the Golden age of American animation, working in various studios in the industry.

== Early life and career ==
Emery Hawkins was born in Jerome, Arizona to a father who was a all-round cowboy for two years and to a mother who was a painter. He started drawing when he was two years old and his family had a lot of history with artistic careers, including his aunts. He went to North Hollywood High School but was a college dropout. Hawkins always animated on flipbooks. At the age of 16 in 1928, he did an animation of a clown walking and dancing, showed it to Disney, and they thought it was a copy of their animation.

Hawkins began his career in the animation industry as a cel inker at the Charles Mintz studio, where he would later be promoted to animator. He would then work at MGM and then move to Walt Disney Productions in the late 30's but would leave in 1941 during the Disney animators' strike because his colleagues said they would never talk to him again if he did strike. Initially going back to Mintz's Studio (now renamed Screen Gems), he would later move to Walter Lantz Productions, where he would co-redesign their flagship character Woody Woodpecker with Art Heinemann. Later in mid-1946 he would move to Warner Bros. Cartoons to animate for Arthur Davis, Robert McKimson, Chuck Jones, and Friz Freleng up until 1950. Hawkins later worked in John Sutherland Productions as well as working and directing the 1954 Mexican cartoon Manolin Torero with his former colleague Pat Matthews at Dibujos Animados. He briefly did commercials for different companies in the 1950s, including Playhouse Pictures, Storyboard Inc., Pelican Films, Quartet Films and Bill Melendez Productions.

== Later career and death ==
Hawkins later years had him working in Richard Williams' animation studio. There he worked on the Greedy scene in Raggedy Ann & Andy: A Musical Adventure with assistant animator Dan Haskett (who disliked the job), as well as animating The Thief and the Cobbler, that latter which he worked with other colleagues he knew in the industry, such as Ken Harris and Grim Natwick. The film itself wouldn't see an official release until 1993.

Hawkins developed Alzheimer's disease in his later years and was forced to retire. He died in 1989 at the age of 77.

== List of animated works ==
- The Captain and the Kids (1938–1939) (character animation)
- Count Screwloose (1939) (character animation)
- Donald Duck (1939–1947) (character animation)
- Woody Woodpecker (1940s) (character animation) (co-directed: Ration Bored) (character design: Ration Bored)
- Andy Panda (1940s) (character animation)
- Swing Symphony (1940s) (character animation) (co-direction: The Egg Cracker Suite) (character design: The Egg Cracker Suite)
- Mickey Mouse (1941) (character animation)
- Looney Tunes (1947–early 1950s) (character animation)
- Merrie Melodies (1947–early 1950s) (character animation)
- The Bugs Bunny Show (1960) (character animator)
- Manolin Totero (1962) (director), a production of Dibujos Animados, S.A. supported by the US Information Agency
- The Bugs Bunny/Road Runner Hour (1968) (character animation)
- Play It Again, Charlie Brown (1971) (graphic blandishment)
- Snoopy Come Home (1972) (graphic blandishment)
- Raggedy Ann and Andy: A Musical Adventure (1977) (animated The Greedy)
- The Bugs Bunny Mystery Special (1980) (character animation)
- Gnomes (film) (1980) (character animation)
- The Looney, Looney, Looney Bugs Bunny Movie (1981) (character animation)
- Daffy Duck's Movie: Fantastic Island (1983) (character animation)
- The Bugs Bunny and Tweety Show (1986) (character animation)
- Daffy Duck's Quackbusters (1988) (character animation)
- The Thief and the Cobbler (1993) (lead character animator)
