= Who's Who in Animal Land =

1944 film directed by Lou Lilly

- Directed by: Lou Lilly
- Written by: Justin Herman
- Produced by: Jerry Fairbanks
- Starring: Ken Carpenter
- Distributed by: Paramount Pictures
- Release date: December 2, 1944
- Running time: 10 minutes
- Country: United States
- Language: English

Who's Who in Animal Land is a 1944 American short comedy film directed by Lou Lilly. In 1945, it won an Oscar for Best Short Subject (One-Reel) at the 17th Academy Awards.

== Cast ==
- Ken Carpenter - Narrator
