= Angel Puss =

1944 animated film by Chuck Jones

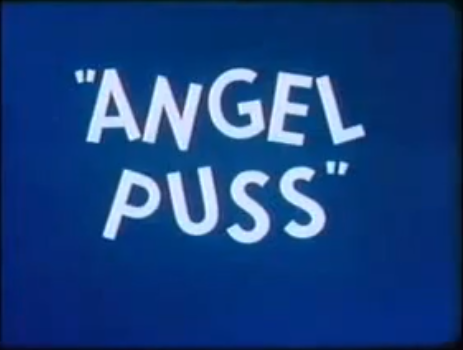
- Title card
- Directed by: Charles M. Jones
- Story by: Lou Lilly
- Produced by: Leon Schlesinger
- Music by: Carl W. Stalling
- Animation by: Ken Harris
- Color process: Technicolor
- Distributed by: Warner Bros. Pictures; The Vitaphone Corporation
- Release date: June 3, 1944
- Running time: 7 minutes

Angel Puss is a 1944 Warner Bros. Looney Tunes cartoon directed by Chuck Jones. The short was released on June 3, 1944.

The protagonist is a "Li'l Sambo" type blackface character who exhibits common racial stereotypes in speech, intelligence and fear of the supernatural. The African-American weekly newspaper The Pittsburgh Courier objected strongly to the cartoon, especially because it was run in Los Angeles alongside the March of Time short Americans All, on the theme of fighting prejudice and stereotypes. The film press did not acknowledge these concerns.

The short is one of the "Censored Eleven", a group of Warner Bros. animated shorts that are withheld from circulation due to their dated racist stereotyping and portrayals. This is also the only Looney Tunes short in the Censored Eleven, as the other shorts are Merrie Melodies, and the only short of the Censored Eleven Jones directed.

== Plot ==
A young African-American boy (drawn in blackface style) carries a sack to a river and laments that he has agreed to drown a cat. While the boy stares at the water, the cat slips out of the sack and fills it with bricks. When the boy says that he can't go through with the task, the hidden cat, pretending to be the boy's conscience, says, "Go ahead, Sambo, go ahead, boy," and reminds him that he has been paid "four bits" to do the job. Sambo reluctantly drops the bag in the river rather than return the money.

The cat then disguises itself as its own ghost, painting itself white and donning wings and a halo, and proceeds to "haunt" Sambo by repeatedly sneaking up on him and whispering "boo". Sambo runs away, but the cat rattles a pair of dice, causing Sambo to fall into a trance and unconsciously walk back to the cat (part of a running gag in Warner Bros. cartoons that stereotypes African-Americans as being addicted to gambling).

The hauntings continue until Sambo and the cat fall in a pond, washing off the cat's paint. When Sambo realizes that he has been tricked, he kills the cat with a shotgun blast. Immediately afterward, a line of nine ghost cats (representing a cat's nine lives) marches toward Sambo, saying, "And this time, brother, us ain't kiddin'."

== Reception ==
On October 7, 1944, Herman Hill wrote an editorial for the African-American weekly The Pittsburgh Courier titled Angel Puss vs. Americans for All. Hill wrote, "Basis for the spontaneous protest by the long and patient suffering Negro theater-going public were the many forth-right expressions of condemnation regarding Warner Brothers' animated cartoon Angel Puss. Almost in direct irony was the picture's showing in Los Angeles, in that it was sandwiched between the main feature and March of Time's Americans for All, which theme is directly aimed at the lessening of racisms. It has since been learned that the Warner Brothers had ordered the somewhat considered controversial Americans for All to be shown in each of their theatres throughout the country as a contributory effort towards breaking down the evils of race prejudice. In a further attempt to throw light on the subject of caricatures, March of Time offices here were contacted. A spokesman stated that they had nothing to do with the placing of their film on the same program as Angel Puss or any other such picture. It was admitted, however, that in consideration of the type of cartoon, poor taste was shown in the matter."

However, this concern was not expressed in the film press, which echoed and celebrated the film's stereotypes. On June 24, Boxoffice said: "A delectable bit of cartoon animation catches the natural aversion of a Colored boy to any form of supernatural suggestion as represented by a cat that was supposed to be drowned by the boy, but escaped. The cat makes life extremely miserable for the boy by dressing up as a spirit, but comes to an unfortunate end. There are lots of hearty chuckles in the reel."
