= Musical Moments from Chopin =

- Directed by: Dick Lundy
- Story by: Ben Hardaway; Milt Schaffer
- Produced by: Walter Lantz
- Music by: Darrell Calker
- Animation by: Laverne Harding; Les Kline; Grim Natwick (unc.); Paul J. Smith (unc.); Casey Onaitis (unc.); Sid Pillet (effects, unc.)
- Backgrounds by: Fred Brunish
- Color process: Technicolor
- Production company: Walter Lantz Productions
- Distributed by: Universal Pictures
- Release date: February 25, 1947
- Running time: 7:46
- Language: English

Musical Moments from Chopin (also known as Chopin's Musical Moments) is a Musical Miniatures cartoon, co-starring Andy Panda and Woody Woodpecker. It was directed by Dick Lundy and released on February 25, 1947.

It was nominated for an Academy Award for best short subject in 1946, losing to MGM's Tom and Jerry cartoon The Cat Concerto, which also featured a piano concert setting.

== Plot ==
This short starts with Andy Panda performing a Chopin polonaise on stage. As he does so, Woody Woodpecker wanders out and starts polishing the piano, and seems impressed by Andy's playing. Woody then plays along with Andy on the following pieces, either on the same or another grand piano, with increasing cut-aways to the animal audience and their own antics.

At some point, an intoxicated horse up in the rafters who was trying to light his cigar tries to use a ceiling lamp to light it, but accidentally causes it to fall and spread a fire onto the stage. Andy manages to finish his piano performance while Woody extinguishes the flames.

== Analysis ==
The short would be the first Musical Miniatures cartoon produced by the studio, and is the only entry to receive an Academy Award nomination for best short subject. This was Lantz's eighth Academy Award nomination.

Dick Lundy previously tested the concept in the 1946 Andy Panda cartoon, The Poet & Peasant. It was proven to be successful as it was also nominated for an Academy Award. Lundy would direct all of the remaining Musical Miniatures cartoons until the series ended after the studios brief closure.

The short features music by Frédéric Chopin played by Woody and Andy. The songs that were played include:

- Polonaise in A major, Op. 40, No. 1 (played in the opening theme)
- Polonaise in A♭ major, Op. 53
- Fantaisie-Impromptu in C♯ minor, Op. 66
- Ecossaise in D major, Op.72/3
- Mazurka in B♭ major, Op. 7/1
- Scherzo No. 2 in B♭ minor, Op. 31

In 1958, the television show The Woody Woodpecker Show premiered, and continued on the air in various forms for the next four decades. Episode 18 of its first season included Musical Moments from Chopin along with other Lantz cartoons, and a making-of involving Lantz and storyboarding.
