= Draftee Daffy =

1945 animated short film directed by Bob Clampett

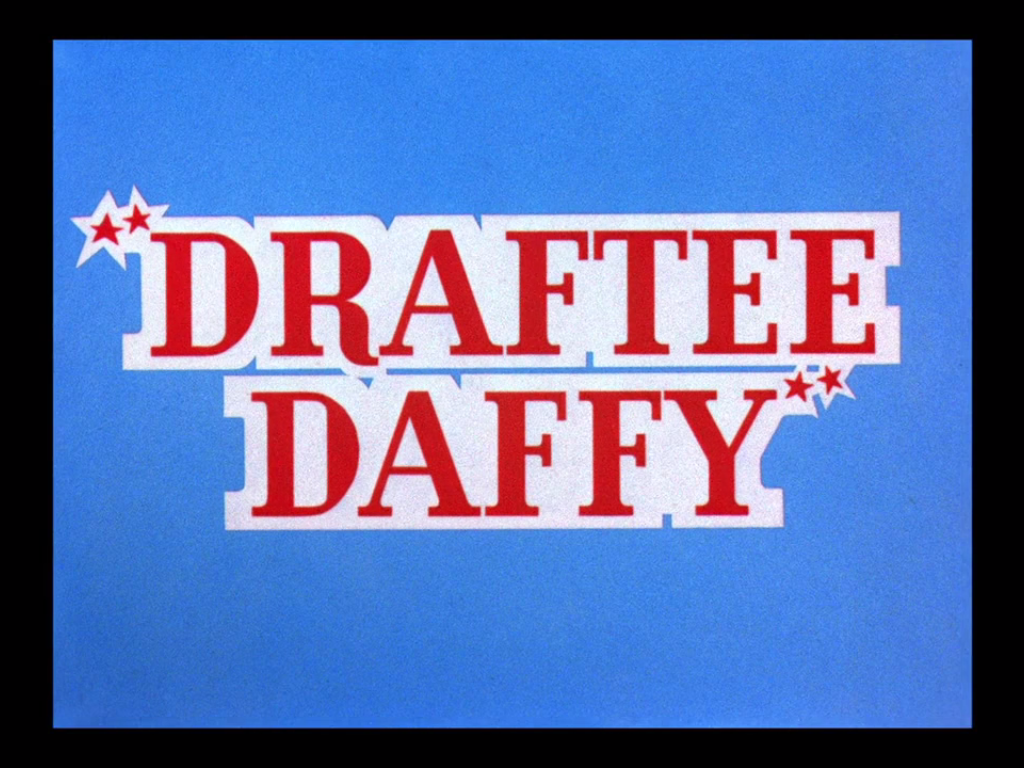
- Title card
- Directed by: Robert Clampett
- Story by: Lou Lilly
- Starring: Mel Blanc (uncredited)
- Music by: Carl W. Stalling
- Animation by: Rod Scribner
- Color process: Technicolor
- Production company: Warner Bros. Cartoons
- Distributed by: Warner Bros. Pictures; The Vitaphone Corporation
- Release date: January 27, 1945 (U.S.)
- Running time: 7 minutes
- Country: United States
- Language: English

Draftee Daffy is a 1945 Warner Bros. Looney Tunes cartoon directed by Bob Clampett. The cartoon was released on January 27, 1945, and stars Daffy Duck.

The film depicts Daffy as a draft dodger, who desperately tries to avoid an agent of the draft board. Part of the film is set in hell, but Daffy is unable to end this pursuit.

== Plot ==
Daffy Duck finds himself in a patriotic mood after reading about the United States Armed Forces' success in pushing back Nazi German troops during World War II. However, his mood quickly turns to fear when he receives a phone call from the draft board.

Determined to evade conscription, Daffy engages in a series of frantic attempts to escape the persistent draft board representative. Despite his efforts, Daffy's plans backfire, and he ultimately crash-lands in Hell. To his dismay, he discovers that the demon pursuing him is none other than the man from the draft board, signaling that he cannot escape his fate.

== Voice Cast ==
- Mel Blanc as Daffy Duck / Little Man from the Draft Board (impersonation of The Great Gildersleeve)
- Bob Clampett as "Beeyooop" vocal effect (archival audio from The Henpecked Duck)

== Reception ==
Animation historian Jerry Beck writes that in this film, Clampett "gives Daffy Duck the first nuance to his zany personality—something Chuck Jones would expand upon in later shorts—by making the duck an out-and-out coward. Even funnier, the little man from the draft board is portrayed by a nerdy 4F reject, who personifies government intrusion in our lives."

== Home media ==
- VHS & Laserdisc 1989 - Bugs & Daffy: The Wartime Cartoons - MGM/UA Home Video
- Laserdisc 1992 - The Golden Age of Looney Tunes: Volume 2 - MGM/UA Home Video
- VHS 1999 - Looney Tunes: The Collectors Edition, Vol. 7 - Welcome To Wackyland - Warner Home Video/Columbia House
- DVD 2005 - Looney Tunes Golden Collection: Volume 3 (restored) - Warner Home Video
- DVD 2009 - Looney Tunes Spotlight Collection: Volume 7 (restored) - Warner Home Video
- Blu-Ray & DVD 2014 - Looney Tunes Platinum Collection: Volume 3 (restored) - Warner Home Video

== See also ==
- Daffy Duck filmography
- Looney Tunes and Merrie Melodies filmography (1940–1949)
