= Bob Zurke =

American jazz musician (1912–1944)

Bob Zurke (January 7, 1912 – February 16, 1944) was an American jazz pianist, arranger, composer and briefly a bandleader during the Swing era.

== Biography ==
Born Boguslaw Albert Zukowski in Hamtramck, Michigan, United States, he was already using the name Bob Zurke professionally by the age of 16, when he first recorded with a group led by pioneering female jazz bassist Thelma Terry. At that time, Zurke also began to work as a copyist for the Detroit-based booking agency run by Jean Goldkette. Through the end of 1936, Zurke worked in various Detroit clubs, mostly as a band pianist, and occasionally went on tour with other groups; it was in this period that Zurke developed a long friendship with pianist Marvin Ash, who would later go on to record some of Zurke's compositions.

At the beginning of 1937, Zurke was hired by bandleader Bob Crosby to fill in for Joe Sullivan, then ailing with tuberculosis. It was with Crosby that Zurke gained notice; he contributed arrangements to the band's book and was a featured soloist on several numbers, including his arrangement of Meade Lux Lewis' "Honky Tonk Train Blues", which became a hit. In 1938, Bob Zurke was named the winner in the piano category in the Reader's Poll from Down Beat and, in the course of Alan Lomax's Library of Congress interviews, was singled out by Jelly Roll Morton as the "only one (jazz pianist of the present time) that has a tendency to be on the right track."

In March 1939, Joe Sullivan returned to the Bob Crosby Orchestra and Zurke subsequently worked with the William Morris Agency to form his own band. They debuted at an RCA Victor recording session in July 1939, as Bob Zurke and his Delta Rhythm Orchestra, recording, among other things, Zurke's best known original compositions "Hobson Street Blues" and "Old Tom-Cat on the Keys". Critical and public reception of both the records and the Delta Rhythm Band's first appearances were initially positive, but Zurke proved to be unreliable, unpredictable and somewhat volatile as a leader, partly due to his alcohol dependency and alleged drug use. The band came to a halt not long after its final RCA Victor session in May 1940, which also proved Zurke's last visit to the commercial recording studio; afterward Zurke served a jail sentence in Detroit for failing to pay alimony to his first wife, whom he had divorced in the late 1930s.

After a period of wandering from job to job following his release from jail, Zurke remarried and resettled in Los Angeles in mid-1942. In August 1942, he began an engagement at the Hangover Club in Los Angeles that he held until the end of his days. In December 1943, Zurke made one final recording, synchronizing an original piano part to the Walter Lantz cartoon Jungle Jive (in the Swing Symphony series), one of his most difficult and challenging solos. On February 15, 1944, Bob Zurke collapsed at the Hangover Club and was taken to the hospital; he died the following day of complications of pneumonia, aggravated by acute alcohol poisoning, aged 32.

== Legacy ==
According to pianist Norma Teagarden, Zurke had small hands and needed to develop special techniques to adjust for his lack of reach; this led to him developing a technique and style uniquely his own.

During his lifetime, Zurke was considered one of the finest white boogie-woogie pianists at a time when such players were few. His ability as an arranger and transcriber helped to put pieces by non-readers into a playable, published form, such as in his transcription of Joe Sullivan's "Little Rock Getaway".

Zurke published two folios of jazz piano solos and several sheet music editions of single pieces; in addition to that, 14 original compositions from Zurke are known to exist.

== Selected discography ==
- Bob Zurke: Tom Cat on the Keys, RCA Victor LP JM-1013
- Bob Zurke: Honky Tonk Train Blues, Hep CD 1076
- Bob Crosby's Bob Cats: The Complete Bob Cats, Vol. 1 - In the Beginning
