= A Horse Fly Fleas =

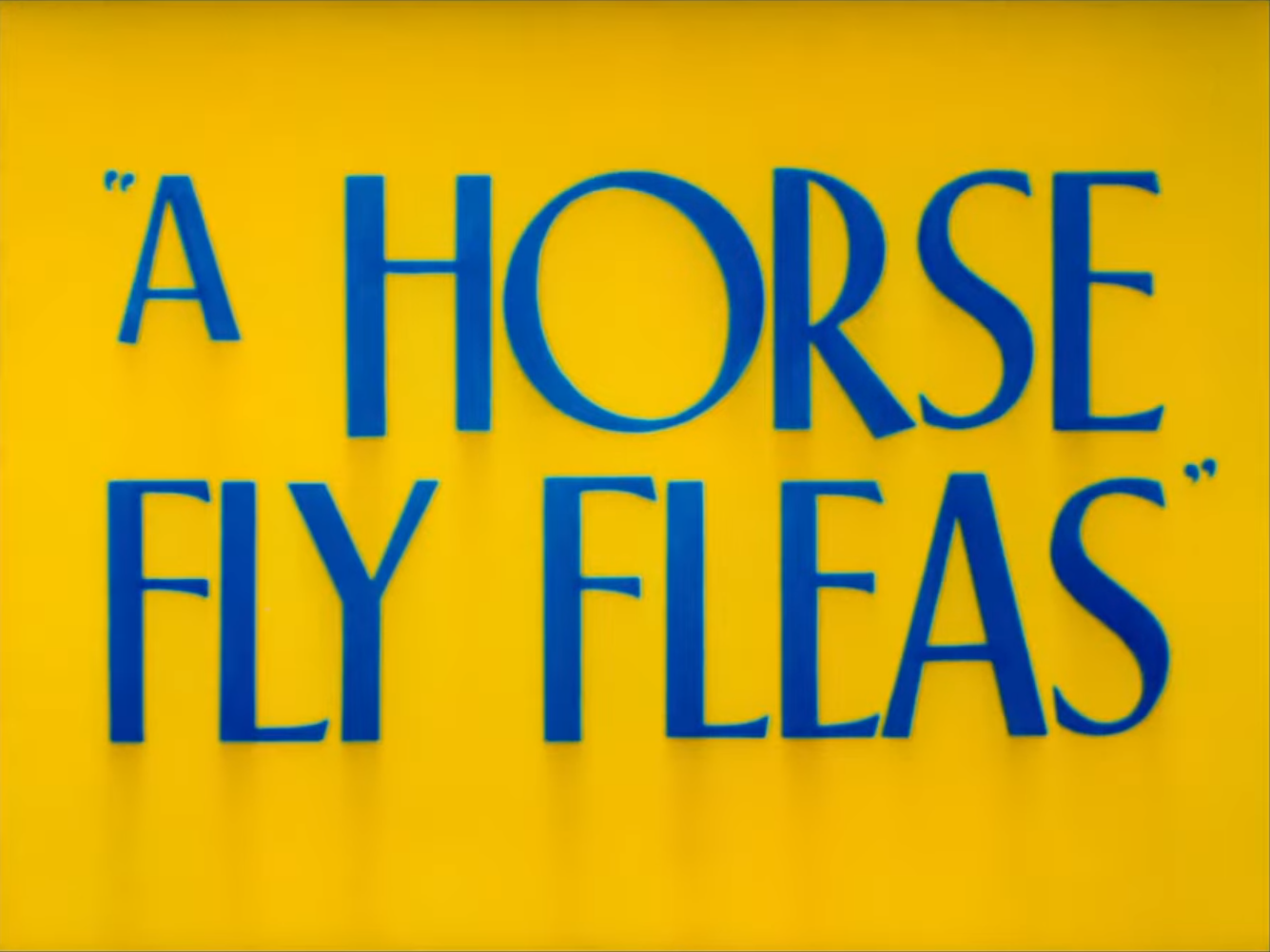
- Original title card
- Directed by: Robert McKimson
- Story by: Warren Foster
- Starring: Mel Blanc
- Music by: Carl Stalling
- Animation by: Charles McKimson; Phil DeLara; Manny Gould; John Carey; Fred Abranz (uncredited); A. C. Gamer (effects animation)
- Layouts by: Cornett Wood
- Backgrounds by: Richard H. Thomas
- Color process: Cinecolor (original release), Technicolor (reissue)
- Production company: Warner Bros. Cartoons
- Distributed by: Warner Bros. Pictures
- Release dates: December 13, 1947 (USA); July 7, 1956 (reissue)
- Running time: 7 minutes
- Language: English

A Horse Fly Fleas (reissued as A Horsefly Fleas) is a 1947 Warner Bros. Looney Tunes cartoon short. It was written by Warren Foster and directed by Robert McKimson. The short was released on December 13, 1947.

The short stars A. Flea, the nearly-microscopic protagonist of An Itch in Time from 1943. Originally released in Cinecolor, the cartoon was reissued in three-strip Technicolor during the 1955–56 season.

== Plot ==
Screenshot of a flea Native American.

A. Flea tries to find a good home. He is also accompanied by a horse fly. They then settle on a dog, not knowing that it is the house of an Indian flea.

== Home media ==
This cartoon was released on DVD and Blu-ray with the original titles and Cinecolor version restored on the Looney Tunes Platinum Collection: Volume 2.
