= Knock Knock (1940 film) =

- Title card
- Directed by: Walter Lantz; Alex Lovy; (both uncredited and disputed)
- Story by: Ben Hardaway; L.E. Elliott
- Produced by: Walter Lantz
- Starring: Mel Blanc; Sara Berner (both uncredited)
- Music by: Frank Marsales
- Animation by: Alex Lovy; Frank Tipper; Les Kline (uncredited); Laverne Harding (uncredited)
- Backgrounds by: Ed Kiechle (uncredited)
- Color process: Technicolor
- Production company: Walter Lantz Productions
- Distributed by: Universal Pictures
- Release date: November 25, 1940
- Running time: 7 minutes
- Language: English

Knock Knock is an animated Andy Panda short film, produced by Walter Lantz. The cartoon is noted for being the first appearance of Woody Woodpecker, and was released by Universal Pictures on November 25, 1940.

== Plot ==
The cartoon ostensibly stars Andy Panda and his father, Papa Panda, but it is Woody Woodpecker who steals the show. Woody constantly pesters Andy Panda and Papa Panda just for the fun of it by pecking at his house roof, tempting him to try to kill the woodpecker with his shotgun. Andy, meanwhile, tries to sprinkle salt on Woody's tail in the belief that this will somehow capture the bird. To Woody's surprise, Andy's attempts prevail (comically, the mound of salt placed on Woody's tail is so heavy that he cannot run away).

== Cast ==
- Sara Berner - Andy Panda
- Mel Blanc - Papa Panda / Woody Woodpecker

== Production notes ==
Like most of the early 1940s Lantz cartoons, Knock Knock carried no director's credit. Lantz himself has claimed to have directed this cartoon, although more recent information has indicated that Alex Lovy was the actual director. The cartoon features animation by Lovy and Frank Tipper, a story by Ben Hardaway and Lowell Elliott, and music by Frank Marsales. Knock Knock was Marsales' final score for Lantz, as well as his only score for a short featuring Woody Woodpecker; subsequent shorts for the rest of the 1940s were composed by Darrell Calker.

As the first appearance of Woody Woodpecker, Knock Knock is also the first cartoon to feature Woody's trademark laugh, a gurgling cackle that voice artist Mel Blanc had been perfecting since high school. This is also the laugh Blanc used for a predecessor to Bugs Bunny in numerous cartoons directed by Hardaway at Leon Schlesinger Productions. This cartoon is also notable for featuring a crude Woody design, something that was softened by 1942 and later changed into a much more realistic and easier to animate woodpecker by 1944. This first design featured Woody with red "vest feathers" (instead of white), buck teeth in some shots, thick ringed legs, two green tail feathers and a big chin which made him look more like a pelican than a woodpecker. The short almost never saw the light of the day because then distributor Bernie Krieser (representing Universal) thought Woody was the ugliest thing he had ever seen, but Lantz convinced Krieser to include the character in the short.

Woody's first words are his trademark "Guess who?" as he pops through the roof of Andy Panda's house, except the voice is normal-sounding instead of sped-up as Woody's voice normally would be.

== See also ==
- Woody Woodpecker filmography
