= An Itch in Time =

1943 film by Robert Clampett

- Blue Ribbon reissue title card
- Directed by: Robert Clampett
- Story by: Warren Foster
- Produced by: Leon Schlesinger
- Music by: Carl W. Stalling
- Animation by: Bob McKimson
- Color process: Technicolor
- Production company: Leon Schlesinger Productions
- Distributed by: Warner Bros. Pictures
- Release date: December 4, 1943
- Running time: 8 min
- Country: United States
- Language: English

An Itch in Time is a 1943 American animated comedy short film directed by Robert Clampett. The cartoon was released on December 4, 1943. It is part of the Merrie Melodies series and the twentieth cartoon to feature Elmer Fudd. The short is notable for featuring A. Flea, who would make another appearance in 1947's A Horse Fly Fleas, directed by Robert McKimson, in which the "A" in the flea's name is revealed to stand for "Anthony".

It was re-released as a "Blue Ribbon" reissue in 1948, rendering the original film and credits lost. Despite copyright neglect by Warner Bros. Pictures, the company realized the mistake and copyrighted the Blue Ribbon reissue, allowing the original film to lapse into the public domain while United Artists renewed the reissue's copyright.

== Plot ==
Elmer Fudd is laughing while lounging in his easy chair and reading his comic book (which is later revealed to have Bugs Bunny and Porky Pig on its cover), his dog nearby, sleeping comfortably in front of the fireplace. All is peaceful until a flea comes bouncing by, dressed in a farmer's-type outfit with a big straw hat, and carrying a satchel inscribed "A. Flea". Pulling out his telescope and spotting the dog, he whistles and shouts in excitement before beginning to sing "Food Around the Corner", which becomes a recurring theme throughout the cartoon. Having awakened the dog by bouncing off his nose, the flea, hiding by the animal's ear, begins softly crooning so as to lull him back to sleep. This is successful, so the flea finds a suitable portion to begin eating (not forgetting to detach the appropriate ration stamp). He takes a bite, which immediately jolts the dog awake, "Yipe! Agony, agony, agony!" He then begins scratching and biting, causing A. Flea to run, though he manages to make it so the dog bites himself.

Elmer reacts, after the dog has leapt, whining, into his lap, by employing the use of flea powder. The flea is not fazed, he simply skates on the powder as if it is ice. Elmer threatens to give the dog a bath if he witnesses him scratching again, which the dog – thinking about how much he hates baths – promises not to do. A. Flea continues searching for and measuring out various selections of the dog's person; he makes use of pickaxes, jackhammers and even explosives while the dog tries to withstand the itching and the overall pain. At one point, he deliberately angers the cat in order to enjoy the claws scratching his back. An angry-looking Elmer catches them and they both retreat as if they have been scolded.

Finally, after A. Flea sets off an explosion in his fur, the dog cannot stand it any longer. Yelping and dragging his posterior across the floor, at one point he stops briefly and says to the viewers, "Hey, I better cut this out. I may get to like it." (reportedly an attempt by Clampett to bait the Hays Office censors, who ultimately left the gag intact). Elmer advances and the dog, realizing a bath is imminent, brakes and slides to a halt. He begs not to be taken for the bath, but Elmer grabs him and begins dragging him toward the inevitable. Suddenly, the flea is on Elmer, who begins to scratch. The dog then proceeds to carry him for a bath. There is a bar of soap on the floor on which the dog slips, landing both of them in the kitchen sink. The flea soon carries the two away on a plate, labelled as a "Blue Plate special", while singing about no more Meatless Tuesdays. Upon witnessing A. Flea carrying the dog and Elmer out of the house, Elmer's cat remarks, "Well, now I've seen everything." He then commits suicide by shooting himself in the head with a revolver (the shooting is cut from all modern airings).

== Production ==
Director Bob Clampett wrote the flea's song, "Food Around the Corner".

== Reception ==
Animator Michael Sporn writes, "In Bob McKimson's animation, the film is as funny as it is artful. McKimson remade the film a few years later in a half-hearted attempt called A Horse Fly Fleas (1947), adding a now controversial scene with American Indians; his direction wasn't nearly as good as Clampett's in the earlier film."

== Home media ==
The short was released on disc 4 of the Looney Tunes Golden Collection: Volume 3 DVD set and disc 2 of the Looney Tunes Platinum Collection: Volume 2 Blu-ray set.

== See also ==
- Elmer Fudd filmography
- Looney Tunes and Merrie Melodies filmography (1940–1949)
