= Sara Berner =

American actress (1912–1969)

- Berner in 1948
- Born: Lillian Ann Herdan; January 12, 1912; Albany, New York, U.S.
- Died: December 19, 1969 (aged 57); Van Nuys, California, U.S.
- Resting place: Mount Sinai Memorial Park Cemetery, Los Angeles, California, U.S.
- Occupation: Actress
- Years active: 1936–1969
- Spouse(s): Arthur Solomon (unknown–his death 1943) Milton Rosner (m. 1951; div. 1958)
- Children: 1

Sara Berner (born Lillian Ann Herdan; January 12, 1912 – December 19, 1969) was an American actress. Known for her expertise in dialect and characterization, she began her career as a performer in vaudeville before becoming a voice actress for radio, TV, and animated shorts. She starred in her own radio show on NBC, Sara's Private Caper, and was best known as telephone operator Mabel Flapsaddle on The Jack Benny Program.

Columnist Erskine Johnson described Berner in 1944 as "the most famous voice in Hollywood."

== Early life and career ==
Born Lillian Ann Herdan in 1912 in Albany, New York, she adopted her stage name by combining her mother's first name (Sarah) and her maiden name of Berner. She was the oldest of four children, and her family relocated to Tulsa, Oklahoma when she was a teenager. She became interested in performing after watching silent movies and vaudeville shows at a theater and then imitating scenes in front of the women's restroom attendant.

Berner performed in an adaptation of Abie's Irish Rose after graduation, and she studied drama for two years at the University of Tulsa. She and her family then moved to Philadelphia, Pennsylvania, where she worked in a Wanamaker's department store until she was fired for mimicking a customer. Berner hosted her own fifteen-minute program (written by Arthur Q. Bryan) thereafter on a local radio station, then returned to New York City in hopes of pursuing a show-business career. She worked in a Broadway millinery in the meantime, and studied dialect by observing customers' Brooklyn accents. She snuck out during a shift to audition for Major Edward Bowes' amateur hour, and was hired the next day. Beginning in 1937, Berner toured the country as part of Bowes' sixteen-member "all-girl unit" of vaudeville acts over the next four years, and created a gimmick of a fired saleslady who performed imitations of celebrities such as Mae West and Katharine Hepburn.

== Career ==
=== Radio ===
After the Major Bowes tour ended, Berner began working in network radio in Hollywood, with recurring roles on Fibber McGee & Molly and The George Burns and Gracie Allen Show. On The Jack Benny Program, she voiced one-time parts before joining the principal cast as the recurring characters of Jack Benny's girlfriend Gladys Zybisco, and wisecracking telephone operator Mabel Flapsaddle, who gossiped about Benny with her colleague Gertrude Gearshift (Bea Benaderet), while Benny waited impatiently on the other end of the line for them to connect his call. Intended as a one-time appearance, they began recurring roles in the 1945–46 season, and in early 1947, Berner and Benaderet momentarily took over the actual NBC switchboards in Hollywood for publicity photos. Other radio work included waitress Dreamboat Mulvany on Arthur's Place; Mrs. Horowitz on Life with Luigi; Helen Wilson on Amos 'n' Andy; and an Italian housekeeper on The Jimmy Durante Show. She was cast alongside Rudy Vallée on his show The Fleischmann's Yeast Hour; however, she sued Vallée in 1945 for $19,500 in damages over claims he reneged on an "oral agreement" that he would hire her for 39 appearances on his show at $500 weekly.

==== Sara's Private Caper ====
As a result of her radio successes, Berner was given her own series on NBC, Sara's Private Caper, in which she starred as a police department stenographer who moonlighted as an amateur sleuth to solve crimes. Billed as "a satire on private detective stories" that claimed to feature Berner's actual voice, the show premiered on June 15, 1950, but was canceled after just eleven weeks, with its final broadcast on August 24. It had been hampered by multiple title changes prior to its debut, as well as confusion over whether to market the program as a mystery, comedy, or drama. Berner returned to supporting roles, but was temporarily removed from The Jack Benny Program for an eighteen-month period between 1954 and 1955 due to an undisclosed dispute with Benny, and was substituted by Shirley Mitchell as Mabel Flapsaddle in that duration.

=== Animation ===
Berner was active in vocal characterization for animated cartoons, working with several studios from the late 1930s through the 1940s. She was initially utilized for her imitations of Hollywood film actresses, such as Katharine Hepburn, Bette Davis, Joan Crawford, and Martha Raye. This led to her being cast in celebrity-ensemble shorts such as Disney's Mother Goose Goes Hollywood (1938) and The Autograph Hound (1939); Walter Lantz Productions' Hollywood Bowl (1938); and Warner Bros.' Hollywood Steps Out (1941).

Her mimicking of Hepburn led to her being hired by Lantz as the debut voice of Andy Panda, which she played only twice, in Life Begins for Andy Panda (1939) and Knock Knock (1940). Berner focused on voicing animals thereafter, with her work for Warner Bros. Cartoons (where she replaced Bernice Hansen) ranging from Mama Buzzard in Bugs Bunny Gets the Boid (1942) and The Bashful Buzzard (1945); to A. Flea in the short An Itch in Time (1943); and as part of an ensemble of voices in Book Revue (1946). For the Metro-Goldwyn-Mayer cartoon department, Berner portrayed minor characters in the Tom and Jerry shorts The Zoot Cat (1944) and The Mouse Comes to Dinner (1945). In the MGM live-action film Anchors Aweigh (1945), she voiced the otherwise-silent Jerry Mouse for the animated dance sequence with star Gene Kelly.

In August 1953, Berner provided the debut voice of another Walter Lantz character, the anthropomorphic penguin Chilly Willy. Though she received onscreen credit for her work, her duties consisted only of her singing the cartoon's opening theme, as the character himself was mute until his speaking voice was developed by Daws Butler in the 1960s.

=== Film and television ===
Berner with Frank Cady in Rear Window (1954)

Berner filmed supporting roles in motion pictures from 1942 to 1957, including voicing a camel named Mabel in Road to Morocco (1942). During production, the film's casting director introduced her to Paramount Pictures executive Buddy DeSylva as "Mrs. Camel" instead of her actual name. DeSylva, who had to approve her voice for the character, addressed Berner by the title thereafter, which she disdained. In Alfred Hitchcock's Rear Window (1954), she and Frank Cady portrayed a married couple living in a Greenwich Village apartment complex shared by the film's temporarily immobile main character (played by James Stewart).

Aside from playing Mabel Flapsaddle in three episodes of The Jack Benny Program, Berner appeared on television mainly on variety shows and anthology series through the 1950s, and was the guest of honor on a December 10, 1952 episode of Ralph Edwards' reality series This Is Your Life. However, she worked little in the 1960s, aside from performing at the 1961 Grammy Awards in a comic-relief role alongside Mort Sahl, and appearing as a guest on Gypsy Rose Lee's daytime talk show in November 1966. Her final acting role was on an episode of CBS Playhouse that aired on January 29, 1967.

== Personal life and death ==
In November 1950, Berner was photographed outside a mobile X-ray unit as part of an awareness campaign by the Los Angeles County X-ray Survey Foundation that encouraged screenings to help combat the spread of tuberculosis.

Berner married her theatrical agent, Milton Rosner, in Las Vegas, Nevada, on August 11, 1951; the couple had one daughter, Eugenie, whom they adopted two years later at eight months old. Rosner remained Berner's agent despite their separation in 1954, but she filed for divorce in May 1958, citing "extreme" verbal cruelty. Though she was awarded custody of their daughter, Berner was arrested in December 1959 on a misdemeanor charge of child endangerment.

Berner adhered to Judaism throughout her life and was a regular parishioner at the Temple Israel of Hollywood. Her Jewish heritage and multi-ethnic upbringing frequently aided her facility with vocal dialects, such as her role as Mrs. Horowitz on the radio program Life with Luigi. Politically, Berner was a registered Democrat and an active member of the Hollywood Democratic Committee. Throughout her life, she publicly championed the party's platforms and supported the administrations and campaigns of Franklin D. Roosevelt, Harry S. Truman, Adlai Stevenson, Lyndon Johnson, Robert Kennedy, and John F. Kennedy.

Berner died at age 57 on December 19, 1969, and was interred at Mount Sinai Memorial Park Cemetery in Los Angeles, but her death was not made public until her family placed a memorial in the Van Nuys News in November 1970. She had been recovering from major surgery at a Culver City convalescent home two months before her death. Berner's personal property was sold at auction in Van Nuys in November 1971.

== Acting style and reception ==
Berner's range of dialects included French, Spanish, Italian, Southern American, and New York English, which she learned by interacting with people who spoke in such accents. Her radio voice work gained unwelcome attention after a columnist described it as "being in bad taste". This in turn led to radio producers ordering her not to use foreign accents to get laughs, a ruling which Berner overturned: "I know I haven't offended anybody because in all the years I've been doing [accents] I've never, not even once, got a nasty letter." Eddie Cantor, with whom Berner first worked in the early 1930s on The Chase and Sanborn Hour, considered her then as "the greatest impersonator and dialectician of all time." Journalist Kay Gardella remarked in 1953 that interviewing Berner was "a Herculean feat" and "like trying to interview a trapeze artist while he's performing" due to Berner's switching to multiple dialects.

Berner was an in-demand entertainer for American servicemen during World War II, giving over 300 performances at Army bases in addition to 84 appearances at the Hollywood Canteen and one on the Saratoga in 1944.

== Filmography ==
=== Shorts ===
==== MGM ====
- Red Hot Riding Hood (1943, Tex Avery) (voices)
- The Zoot Cat (1944, Tom and Jerry) (voice)
- Swing Shift Cinderella (1945) (voice)
- The Mouse Comes to Dinner (1945) (voice)
- Lonesome Lenny (1946) (voice)
- King-Size Canary (1947) (voice)

==== Warner Bros. ====
- Daffy Duck in Hollywood (1938) (voice)
- Confederate Honey (1940) (voice)
- The Hardship of Miles Standish (1940) (voice)
- The Henpecked Duck (1941) (voice)
- The Daffy Duckaroo (1942) (voice)
- The Hep Cat (1942) (voice)
- Bugs Bunny Gets the Boid (1942) (voice)
- An Itch in Time (1943) (voice)
- Goldilocks and the Jivin' Bears (1944) (voices)
- A Gruesome Twosome (1945) (voice)
- The Bashful Buzzard (1945) (voice)
- Book Revue (1946) (voices)
- Baby Bottleneck (1946) (voice)
- Bacall to Arms (1946) (voice)
- Hare Splitter (1948) (voice)

==== Walter Lantz Productions ====
- Life Begins for Andy Panda (1939) (voice)
- Knock Knock (1940) (voice)
- Chilly Willy (1953) (voice, opening theme only)

==== Walt Disney Productions ====
- Mother Goose Goes Hollywood (1938) (voices)
- The Autograph Hound (1939) (voices)

=== Radio ===
- Fibber McGee and Molly (1939)
- The George Burns and Gracie Allen Show (1940-1949)
- The Jack Benny Program (1940-1955)
- Command Performance (1942-1948)
- Lux Radio Theatre (1942-1948)
- The Red Skelton Program (1944-1949)
- Cavalcade of America (1944)
- The Rudy Vallee Show (1945-1946)
- The Baby Snooks Show (1946)
- The Eddie Cantor Pabst Blue Ribbon Show (1947-1948)
- Sara's Private Caper (1950)
- Life with Luigi (1950-1952)
- The Amos 'n' Andy Show (1950-1955)
- The Jimmy Durante Show

=== Film ===
Year	Title	Role	Notes
1942	Road to Morocco	Mabel the Camel	Voice, Uncredited
1943	Lucky Jordan	Helen	Uncredited
1945	Anchors Aweigh	Jerry Mouse	Voice, Uncredited
1945	The Sailor Takes a Wife	Elevator Girl	Uncredited
1947	Wife Wanted	Agnes	
1947	Backlash	Dorothy the maid	
1948	The Gay Intruders	Ethel	
1949	City Across the River	Selma	
1949	The Story of Molly X	Amy	
1952	Carrie	Mrs. Oransky	
1954	Rear Window	Wife living above the Thorwalds	
1955	The Naked Street	Millie Swadke	
1957	Spring Reunion	Paula Kratz	

=== Television ===
Year	Title	Role	Notes
1949	Oboler Comedy Theater	Unknown	Episode: "Ostrich in Bed"
1952-1953, 1955	The Jack Benny Program	Mabel Flapsaddle; Slim-Finger Sara	3 episodes 1 episode
1952	This Is Your Life	Herself	1 episode; guest of honor
1953	Four Star Revue	Guest Comedic Actress	
1955	The Red Skelton Show	Woman	Episode: "The Cop and the Anthem"
1959	Hour of Stars	Woman Shopper	Episode: "The Miracle on 34th Street"
1959	Border Patrol	Landlady	Episode: "In a Deadly Fashion"
1959	Playhouse 90	Receptionist	Episode: "A Marriage of Strangers"
1967	CBS Playhouse	Shuffler Woman	Episode: "The Final War of Olly Winter"
