= The Lonesome Stranger =

1940 film by Hugh Harman

- Title card
- Directed by: Hugh Harman
- Produced by: Hugh Harman; Fred Quimby (uncredited)
- Music by: Scott Bradley (uncredited)
- Color process: Technicolor
- Production company: Metro-Goldwyn-Mayer
- Distributed by: Loew's, Inc.
- Release date: November 21, 1940
- Running time: 9 min
- Country: United States
- Language: English

The Lonesome Stranger is a 1940 American animated short film directed by Hugh Harman. It is one in numerous one-shot cartoons directed by Harman for Metro-Goldwyn-Mayer.

== Plot ==
The short opens with a shot of a wanted poster, reading "Wanted: The Killer Diller Boys: Dead or Alive." Subsequently, three nasty banditos arrive in a Western town, mocking the town's sheriff by firing the message 'the sheriff is a sissy' via bulletholes into his door. Upon attempting to challenge them, the sheriff is killed by the trio.

Meanwhile, the Lonesome Stranger (a parody of the Lone Ranger) and his horse, Sliver (a caricature of Rochester from the Jack Benny Program) are sitting alone in the hills. Then an Indian from Western Onion (parody of Western Union) arrives on a scooter. The Indian messenger recites a telegram addressed to the duo, announcing that "the sheriff has been shot" to the tune of "The Farmer in the Dell". The messenger turns to reveal the phrase "The Vanishing American" on the back of his shirt, as he subsequently vanishes.

Lonesome takes Silver to the bar, riding to town. He encounters the banditos, who shoot in the bar. Lonesome uses two guns and one bandito takes them. Lonesome is tied to a barrel of gunpowder. One bandito sets fire to the rope for the explosion. The bandito reads the schedule as three of them go outside to ride their horses. Silver is tied to the stick and the banditos are on their horses. The stagecoach comes with two horses. The Indian from Western Onion arrives again, with another telegram for the wrong message. A different message on the telegram says "The bandits come heap big holdup." The stagecoach leaves and the Indian vanishes again.

The banditos ride on their horses and follow the stagecoach. The stagecoach goes fast as the whole bridge goes in the abyss. The banditos hang on the poles without the bridge and follow the stagecoach. Back at the bar, Lonesome tied to the gunpowder barrel and Silver tied to a stick unties himself to save Lonesome. The banditos are riding their horses to rob the stagecoach. The horses put their heads in the ground and the carriage comes apart and the stagecoach puts it back together. The horses take their heads out of the ground. They continue riding and the gunpowder goes off like a rocket exploding the banditos and the stagecoach. Lonesome bumps into the sign that says "See Colorado" and runs away as the cartoon ends.
