= Darrell Calker =

American composer (1905–1964)

Darrell Wallace Calker (February 18, 1905 – February 20, 1964) was an American composer and arranger who worked on films and animated cartoons.

== Early life and education ==
Calker was born in Washington, D.C. to Morris H. and Lugenia E. (Lily) Wallace of Philadelphia. He grew up with his younger sister Rena in the District of Columbia, where he attended Episcopal Cathedral School and sang with a church choir in his teens. He studied with Edgar Priest and David Pell, graduating from the Curtis Institute of Music in Philadelphia.

== Career ==
Calker's early work in Hollywood included orchestration for Victor Young. He was also active as the composer of scores for the Ballets Russes de Monte Carlo and Sadlers Wells Royal Ballet. Among his compositions were the suites for orchestra, Golden Land and Penguin Island.

After arriving in Los Angeles by the mid-1930s, Calker worked as a session musician, and composed songs including Strings Full of Swing and Dixieland Strut. He formed his own band, which appeared on radio in the early 1940s.

It was at this time Walter Lantz hired Calker to be his musical director in December 1940, replacing former Warner Bros. composer Frank Marsales. Calker was an uncredited composer (along with Michael Michelet and Clarence Wheeler) on Shirley Temple's teen star vehicle, Miss Annie Rooney (1942). His first cartoon was the Andy Panda short Mouse Trappers (Released in January 1941) and Calker composed the scores for all Walter Lantz Productions' cartoons until Drooler's Delight (1949) when the studio temporarily closed. Included were the Swing Symphony cartoons featuring musicians like Nat King Cole, Meade Lux Lewis, Jack Teagarden and Bob Zurke, whom Calker knew and convinced to work on the cartoons. His classical music scores for The Poet and Peasant (1946) and Musical Moments from Chopin (1947) earned the studio Academy Award nominations for Best Musical Short and a Musical Courier Citation in 1947 for best cartoon score. Calker also scored animated shorts for Screen Gems (the cartoon division of Columbia Pictures) until it closed in 1946. He would also score a few cartoons by John Sutherland.

== Feature films ==
Calker's first feature film was the independently made Dangerous Millions (1946). The musical supervisor was David Chudnow, who later took music that had been composed for films he worked on and released it as television stock music in the Mutel Library. He also composed, with Del Porter, the Reddy Polka in 1945, used in industrial films about Reddy Kilowatt, the cartoon spokesman for electrical power.

Calker spent the 1950s working on B movies for Eagle-Lion Films, such as Forbidden Jungle (1950), Allied Artists, such as From Hell It Came (1957) and American International Pictures, including Voodoo Woman (1957) and Beyond the Time Barrier and the independent production The Flying Saucer (1960). He also composed the scores for Rolling Home (1946), Albuquerque (1948), El Paso, and Superman and the Mole Men (1951), which functioned as a pilot for the 1950s television series.

He returned to the Lantz studio in 1961 and scored twelve cartoons before his death, aged 59, in Los Angeles, California. He composed the themes to the Beary Family, Willoughby (both with Judy Zahler) and Homer Pigeon (with Porter) cartoons. His last picture was Rah Rah Ruckus (1964).
