= Bubble and Squeek =

British series of short animated films

Bubble And Squeek
- Early Character Title Card As Seen In The Cartoon’s
- Produced by: George Moreno Jr.
- Animation by: George Moreno Jr.; H. Mack; Hugh Gladwish; Pam French; Jimmie Holt; Fag Thompson
- Color process: Technicolor
- Production company: British Animated Productions
- Distributed by: Pathe Pictures
- Country: United Kingdom
- Language: English

Bubble and Squeek is a British animated cartoon series created in 1946 by George Moreno Jr. It was released by British Animated Productions in Harringay, and was distributed by Pathe Pictures. The films revolve around the adventures of the two main characters: Bubble and Squeek. Their names are derived from the British dish bubble and squeak. All shorts were produced in Technicolor.

The series contained 4 films and 1 spin-off which were produced between 1946 and 1948. The cartoons have faded into obscurity and the only copies online are poor-quality copies from videotapes.

== History ==
George Moreno Jr. was an American animator for both Universal/Lantz and Fleischer Studios from 1938 until 1940, where he also worked on Gulliver's Travels, among other series. During World War II, he befriended Richard Smith shortly after a war-time meeting between a U.S. soldier, some British artists, and a chartered accountant. Moreno Jr. then showed him the concept of the two main characters, Bubble and Squeak. After the war, Moreno Jr. and Smith developed their own animation studio inside a backroom of a building that was previously bombed during the war called British Animation Productions, and immediately produced the characters and cartoons after establishment. Initially being planned as a full theatrical series, the company soon collapsed after the United Kingdom lifted its restriction on foreign products, thus bringing in a flood of American-made cartoons to the market.

== Plot ==
The cartoons revolve around the adventures of its two main characters. Bubble is a taxi driver. Squeek is the taxi whom Bubble drives. The cartoons visit a variety of places, from the funfair to a haunted house. Their adventures are light-hearted.

== Characters ==
=== Bubble ===
Bubble is a taxi driver who drives Squeek. He wears a green scarf, blue trousers, a yellow t-shirt, brown jacket and a hat.

=== Squeek ===
Squeek is the taxi that is driven by Bubble. He has a blue body and yellow wheels.

=== Recurring characters ===
Colonel Rat is featured in Old Manor House and also in Loch Ness Legend as he tries to get the Loch Ness Monster.

Willie the Worm is only featured in Loch Ness Legend. Willie helps Colonel catch the monster by using himself as bait.

== Shorts ==
Release Date	Title	Producer	Director	Animation	Layouts and backgrounds	Music
August 14, 1946	The Big City	George Moreno Jr.	N/A	George Moreno Jr.; H. Mack	N/A	José Norman
Bubble and Squeek set off to London to find work. However, Squeek is terrified of the busy traffic and potential customers are being stolen by other taxis. They set off back home until Bubble has an idea. Bubble and Squeek are now picking up customers at a fast rate when their customers' tires mysteriously burst. We find out why their customers tires are bursting in the final shot when Bubble sees a car coming and throws a thumbtack on the road; hence the mysterious bursting.: Was later recolored in the 1970’s.; The First Bubble and Squeek cartoon made by the studio.
1947	Fun Fair	George Moreno Jr.	Harold F. Mack	Pam French; Hugh Gladwish; Jimmie Holt	Claude A. Lipscombe	José Norman
Bubble is awoken by a newspaper which features an advert for a funfair. Bubble is intrigued and seems eager; but Squeek would rather work. However, Squeek quickly changes his mind when he sees a shining three-tone horn for grand prize. They can't get knock the coconut down, which is how they will get the horn. Until, a fortune-teller gives them another ball to knock it down, but that does not work. Ashamed and empty-handed, Bubble tries to kill himself via a self inflicted gunshot in the head, but Squeek diverts the gun and ends up destroying the funfair and the coconut, which makes them win the grand prize.: The staff that worked on the cartoon are credited via caricatures, and were referred to in first name only (with the exception of Moreno).
1948	Home Sweet Home	George Moreno Jr.	Harold F. Mack	Hugh Gladwish; Pam French; Jimmie Holt; H. Mack	Claude A. Lipscombe	José Norman
A flea-bitten tramp visits the Bubble household and takes over Little Squeeker's chair, so she devises a plan to get rid of him. Her plans don't work and she changes her mind when she thinks of what will happen if the tramp is out of the house and welcomes the tramp into the house.: First short to introduce Squeeker and Rags the Tramp.
October 29, 1948	Old Manor House	George Moreno Jr.	Harold F. Mack	Hugh Gladwish; Pam French; Jimmie Holt; H. Mack	Claude A. Lipscombe	José Norman
Caught between a storm. Bubble and Squeek take refuge in an abandoned mansion, which is owned by Colonel Rat. Colonel Rat is determined to catch the intruders. Both Bubble and Squeek think the mansion is haunted and hide when Colonel Rat is firing cannonballs at them. During the battle, Colonel gets tangled in a net which makes him look like a ghost. Squeek gets caught on armor. Bubble tries to be heroic by going after the 'ghost' but is surprised to find that he was just a little rat.: First short to introduce Colonel Rat.
1948	Loch Ness Legend	George Moreno Jr.	George Moreno Jr.	Hugh Gladwish; Fag Thompson	Claude A. Lipscombe	José Norman
Colonel Rat and Willie the Worm turn detective. They set off to find if the Loch Ness monster is genuine after it ruins his meal. He ends up finding it in a river with the help of Willie the Worm as bait, where the monster informs the rat that she is a legend. After telling Colonel, the monster then skips off the mountains.: The shorts a spinoff and mainly stars Colonel Rat and Willie.; The Last Bubble and Squeek cartoon made by the studio before closing.
