= Andy Panda =

- Woody Woodpecker character
- First appearance: Life Begins for Andy Panda (1939)
- Created by: Walter Lantz; Alex Lovy
- Adapted by: Walter Lantz Productions
- Designed by: Walter Lantz
- Voiced by: Sara Berner (1939–1941, 1947); Margaret Hill-Talbot (1942); Dick Nelson (1943); Harry E. Lang (1944, 1948; whistling); Walter Tetley (1944–1949); Dick Beals (1952); Mel Blanc (1957); Daws Butler (1964); Scott Weil (2018)
- Years active: 1939–present

In-universe information
- Full name: Andy Panda
- Species: Panda
- Gender: Male
- Family: Papa Panda (father)

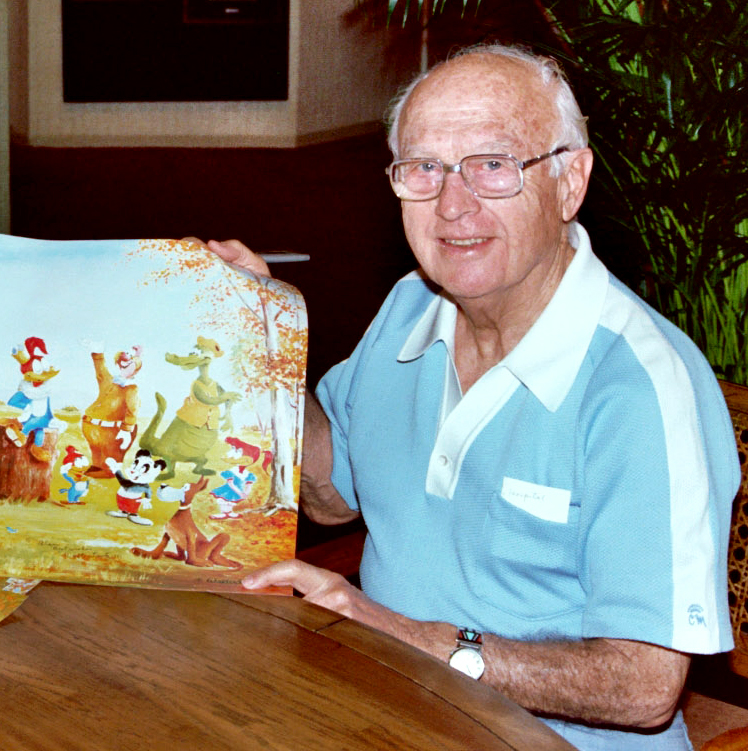
Walter Lantz with Woody Woodpecker painting, 1983

Andy Panda is a cartoon character who starred in his own series of animated cartoon short subjects produced by Walter Lantz. These "cartunes" were released by Universal Pictures from 1939 to 1947, and United Artists from 1948 to 1949. The title character is an anthropomorphic cartoon character, a cute panda. Andy became the second star of the Walter Lantz cartoons after Oswald the Lucky Rabbit (formerly). He achieved considerable popularity until being eventually supplanted by Woody Woodpecker.

== History ==
When Oswald the Lucky Rabbit retired in 1938, following a nine-year run, Walter Lantz's studio went for months without recurring characters. It was not until late 1937, when Lantz had a trip to a zoo. There, the main attraction of the place was a young panda of which Lantz drew pictures. He would then use his drawings to construct a new character.

Andy's first cartoon was the aptly titled Life Begins for Andy Panda in 1939. This was obvious wordplay on the perky titles of the popular Andy Hardy films of that era. Coincidentally, a later Andy Hardy film was actually titled Life Begins for Andy Hardy.

In the first three cartoons of the series, Andy's companion was a feisty turtle named Mr. Whippletree (voiced by Danny Webb) who was a caricature of Eddie Anderson. Andy's father, the bragging Papa Panda (voiced at various times by Danny Webb, Mel Blanc, and Dick Nelson) was often the fall guy for Andy's pranks. When Mr. Whippletree disappeared from the series, Papa began to function as both companion and foil.

Andy was at first a mischievous cub, whose blustery Papa is frequently trying to prove himself as a good role model. Later, Andy became a stand-alone star in the vein of Mickey Mouse, and even acquired a Pluto-like dog named Milo (voiced by Bill Shaw) as a pet.

The 1940 Andy Panda short Knock Knock featured the first appearance of Lantz's most famous character, Woody Woodpecker.

By 1942, Andy Panda started wearing clothes and shoes in Nutty Pine Cabin. The character was then given a major overhaul by director Shamus Culhane for the 1944 short The Painter and the Pointer, with a far more malicious personality than he had ever shown previously. In these shorts, Andy was depicted as having little patience for his canine companion and would occasionally threaten violence on him. This new version was disliked by both Lantz and audiences, and was not used again. Lantz continued to produce Andy Panda shorts until he closed his studio in 1949. Andy's last short was Scrappy Birthday (1949), which featured his girlfriend, Miranda Panda (voiced by Grace Stafford). When the studio reopened in 1950, the Andy Panda series never returned to production, but he would make one more appearance in the Woody Woodpecker Halloween television special Spook-A-Nanny (1964), this time voiced by Daws Butler.

Andy led a major part of his career in comic books, in Dell Comics' Crackajack Comics and New Funnies. One early Andy Panda comic book adventure was drawn by Carl Barks (New Funnies #76, 1943). John Stanley also did Andy Panda comic book work.

In two 1943 cartoons, Andy Panda's Victory Garden and Meatless Tuesday, Andy's foil was a nameless rooster. In late 1943, this rooster became Andy's comic book sidekick, Charlie Chicken: "hatched" in NF #79 and rapidly growing into the cartoon model. Stories about Andy's and Charlie's often-bizarre adventures ran for many years. Some were reprinted domestically as recently as the 1990s, and in Sweden as recently as 2001.

== Other appearances ==
Andy also appeared alongside Woody in shorts such as Banquet Busters and Musical Moments from Chopin. He also had a cameo in The Woody Woodpecker Polka with Miranda Panda, Oswald Rabbit, and Charlie Chicken. In print, Andy Panda appeared in a Whitman Publishing 1943–1944 Better Little Book "Andy Panda and Tiny Tom" which differed from the usual Big Little Book format by having art on every page instead of art on alternate pages. Andy was scheduled to appear as a cameo in the film Who Framed Roger Rabbit in the deleted scene "Acme's Funeral", but a gold-colored Papa made the cut.

The character appears in the 2018 Woody Woodpecker series, voiced by Scott Weil. Andy also has a more mature voice with a Southern twang in this series.

== See also ==
- List of fictional bears
- List of Walter Lantz cartoon characters
