= Laverne Harding =

American animator and cartoonist (1905–1984)

- Born: Emily La Verne Harding; October 10, 1905; Shreveport, Louisiana, U.S.
- Died: September 25, 1984 (aged 78); Los Angeles, California, U.S.
- Other names: LaVerne Harding; Verne Harding; Emily Harding
- Education: Chouinard Art Institute
- Occupations: Animator, cartoonist, writer, storyboard artist
- Years active: 1932–1974
- Employer(s): Walter Lantz Productions (1932–1960); Hanna-Barbera (1960–1964); DePatie–Freleng Enterprises (1964–1967); Warner Bros.–Seven Arts Animation (1967–1969); Filmation (1969–1974)
- Notable work: Woody Woodpecker; Cynical Susie
- Awards: Winsor McCay Award, 1980

Emily Laverne Harding (October 10, 1905 – September 25, 1984) was an American animator and cartoonist. Harding, who worked for the Walter Lantz studio for much of her half-century career in animation, is among the earliest woman animators. She is also one of the few women to receive a Winsor McCay Award for lifetime achievement, one of the most prestigious awards in animation (only nine women have been recognized out of 161 awards given). She won this award in 1980.

== Early life ==
Harding was born on October 10, 1905, to Christians John B. Harding and Pearle W. Harding in Shreveport, Louisiana. Her family moved to Los Angeles in 1911. Harding attended the Chouinard Art Institute from 1930 to 1932. She was a member of the Delta Kappa Sorority and attended at social events.

== Career ==
Working for the Lantz studio from 1932 until 1960, Harding was particularly noted for her work on Woody Woodpecker cartoons; she designed the version of the character that was in use from 1950 to 1998. When Tex Avery offered her to go with him to Warner Bros. Cartoons, she refused. At first, she was an inker, but in 1934, she was ranked up to animator, and from 1940 to 1960, Harding was credited as such. From 1954 to 1955, Harding reunited with Avery to animate on his cartoons at Lantz. While working for the Lantz studios, Harding also drew a humorous newspaper strip, Cynical Susie, for United Feature Syndicate from 1932 to 1934. Cynical Susie revolved around the exploits of the titular heroine (a dwarf woman) and her pet cow, Lily Whey. After leaving Lantz, she animated for Hanna-Barbera cartoons such as Yogi Bear. She later worked for DePatie–Freleng Enterprises on Pink Panther cartoons, and was briefly employed at Warner Bros. and Filmation as well.

== Death ==
Harding died in her home on September 25, 1984, in Los Angeles.
