= Falling Hare =

1943 film by Robert Clampett

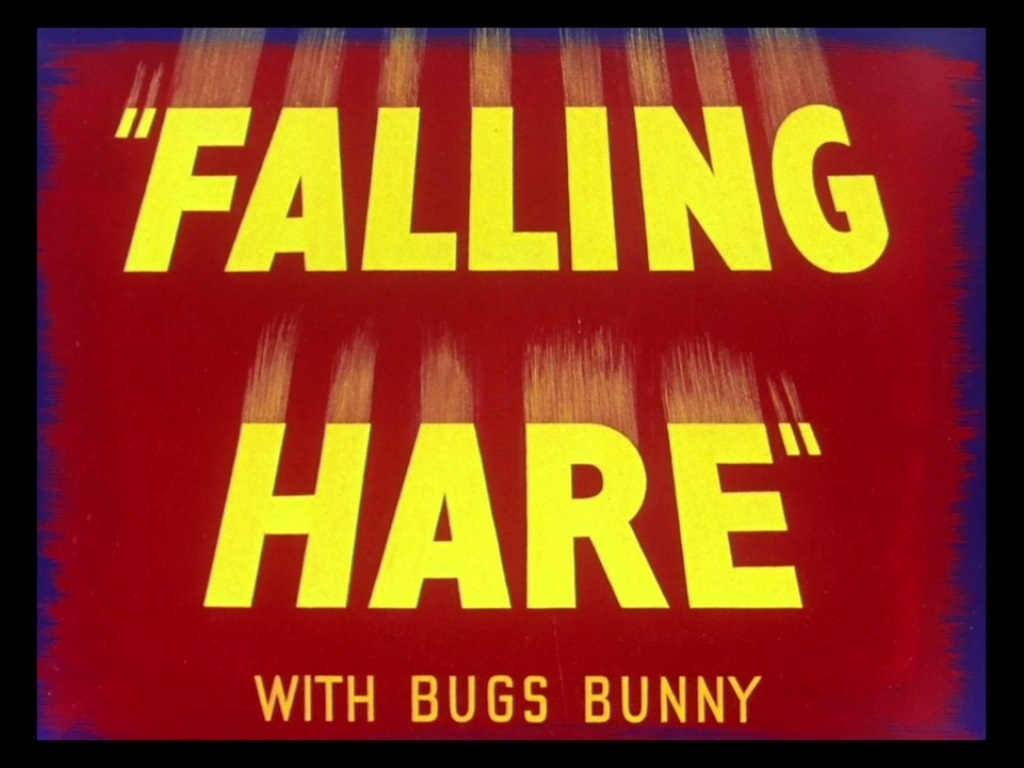
- Title card
- Directed by: Robert Clampett
- Story by: Warren Foster
- Produced by: Leon Schlesinger
- Music by: Carl W. Stalling
- Animation by: Rod Scribner
- Color process: Technicolor
- Production company: Leon Schlesinger Productions
- Distributed by: Warner Bros. Pictures
- Release date: October 30, 1943
- Running time: 8 min
- Country: United States
- Language: English

Falling Hare is a 1943 American animated comedy short film directed by Robert Clampett. It is part of the Merrie Melodies series and the 23rd cartoon to feature Bugs Bunny.

In this film, Bugs Bunny tries to prevent the wrecking of an American military aircraft by a gremlin. The setting is a base of the United States Army Air Forces. The film's finale explicitly refers to wartime rationing in the United States. The short entered the public domain in 1972, due to United Artists, the holder of the short at the time, failing to renew the copyright by that year.

== Plot ==
At a U.S. Army Air Field (which information is censored - the location, number of men and planes is censored as military secrets - and "What Men Think Of Top Sergeant" is "CENSORED!!" in much larger letters, as such language could not pass the muster of the Hays Office), Bugs Bunny, who's reading a book "Victory Thru Hare Power", laughs at the portion about gremlins, creatures that wreck planes with "diabolical sabotage". As he laughs, a gremlin appears and begins to hit the tip of the Block Buster bomb, on which Bugs is resting, with a huge mallet. Bugs offers to hit it for him, but stops at the very last moment after realizing what is he doing. As he turns to confront the gremlin, he finds it gone.

As Bugs wonders about the creature he just talked to, the gremlin reappears and hits him on the foot with a wrench. Furious, Bugs chases the gremlin, who traps the former into a plane and starts it into takeoff. After a struggle during the flight, which also involves avoiding skyscrapers in the city, the plane goes into a super fast nosedive towards earth. However, just as it is about to hit the ground, the plane stops in midair, with both the gremlin and Bugs proclaiming to the audience that "they've run out of gas," and made a reference to wartime rationing of gasoline for non-essential civilians.

== Production ==
Falling Hare went into production under the title Bugs Bunny and the Gremlin. Walt Disney Productions was developing a feature based on Roald Dahl's novel The Gremlins, and asked other animation studios not to produce any films involving gremlins. However, Warner Bros. was too far into production on this cartoon and Russian Rhapsody to remove the references to gremlins, so Leon Schlesinger merely re-titled the cartoons as a compromise. Bugs Bunny's reading at the opening scene of the short of Victory thru Hare Power is a deft reference to Disney's propaganda film Victory through Air Power.

== Release ==
Because of the cartoon's public domain status, it can be found on budget compilations in lower quality prints, while Warner Home Video issued a restored print on Looney Tunes Golden Collection: Volume 3 and Looney Tunes Platinum Collection: Volume 3, with optional audio commentary by John Kricfalusi and Bill Melendez (Melendez was one of the animators on the cartoon). In 1989, it was included in the MGM/UA Home Video release Bugs & Daffy: The Wartime Cartoons.

When the Southern Television broadcast interruption occurred in the United Kingdom, the interruption ended shortly before the start of this cartoon.

Elements from the short have been used in other Warner Bros. works.

- Footage of this cartoon's climax was incorporated as a flashback into a later Bugs Bunny cartoon, His Hare-Raising Tale (1951). Bugs, narrating to his nephew Clyde, describes himself as a World War II test pilot who narrowly escaped death in a near-crash (fortunately, as in Falling Hare, he ran out of gas). There is no mention of the Gremlin character, and one of Bugs' screams ("Yow-ooo-ooo-ooo-ooo!!") from earlier in the cartoon is inserted into the soundtrack. The scene fades out as it zooms in on the stalled aircraft suspended inches above the ground.
- Black-and-white footage from the cartoon was featured in the second trailer for Gremlins 2: The New Batch (directed by Joe Dante). Though no footage was used in the theatrical cut of the film, a clip from the cartoon appeared in the VHS and Japanese LaserDisc versions.
- The Gremlin nemesis makes two reappearances in Tiny Toon Adventures. In "Journey to the Center of Acme Acres", the Gremlin appears (with several look-alikes) as the cause of earthquakes in Acme Acres after their gold is stolen by Montana Max. Clampett is given an acknowledgement in the credits for their design. In the special Night Ghoulery, a singular Gremlin antagonizes Plucky Duck in the segment titled "Gremlin on a Wing" (a spoof of the Twilight Zone episode "Nightmare at 20,000 Feet").
- It also made a brief cameo in "Plane Pals" (an episode from Animaniacs) as a passenger.
- The scene in which a flattened Bugs mutters "I'm only 3½ years old" and rolls on the floor flat as a pancake is used in "Who Bopped Bugs Bunny?" (an episode from Tiny Toon Adventures).
- The ending "out of gas" gag is referenced in the 2003 theatrical release Looney Tunes Back in Action. Bugs, Daffy, and the live-action characters in the spy car are suspended above the ground until one character comments on the situation's lack of realism, prompting the car to fall the remaining few feet.
- The short was loosely adapted into the 2021 Looney Tunes Cartoons short "High Speed Hare". In this short, Bugs fights the Gremlin while testing a self-driving car, and it shares the ending "out of gas" gag, except the car explodes just when Bugs and the Gremlin break the fourth wall.

== Reception ==
Animator and director David Bowers writes, "Falling Hare is wonderful for many reasons, but the most fun to be had is seeing someone finally get the better of Bugs Bunny... The final big joke is a masterpiece of comic staging. Clampett pours on the suspense as Bugs and the gremlin hurtle toward the earth in a crashing bomber. Falling Hare is filled with great sight gags, but it is also exciting edge-of-your-seat stuff, decades ahead of its time in terms of action staging and cutting."

== Copyright status ==
The short entered the public domain in 1972, due to United Artists, the holder of the short at the time, failing to renew the copyright by that year. While the Gremlin character became a public domain character as a result, Bugs Bunny did not as the short did not debut his appearance.

== Home media ==
Falling Hare is available on Looney Tunes Golden Collection: Volume 3 and Looney Tunes Platinum Collection: Volume 3.

== Voice cast ==
- Mel Blanc as Bugs Bunny and the Gremlin
- Bob Clampett: vocal effects

== In popular culture ==
The climactic scene in Falling Hare is described in detail in the Douglas Adams novel The Long Dark Tea-Time of the Soul.

== See also ==
- List of animated films in the public domain in the United States
- The Gremlins
- Gremlin
- Gremlins
- Bugs Bunny filmography
- Looney Tunes and Merrie Melodies filmography (1940–1949)

Preceded by A Corny Concerto (not explicitly billed a Bugs Bunny cartoon)	Bugs Bunny Cartoons; 1943	Succeeded by Little Red Riding Rabbit
