= Pillion (horse) =

British Thoroughbred racehorse

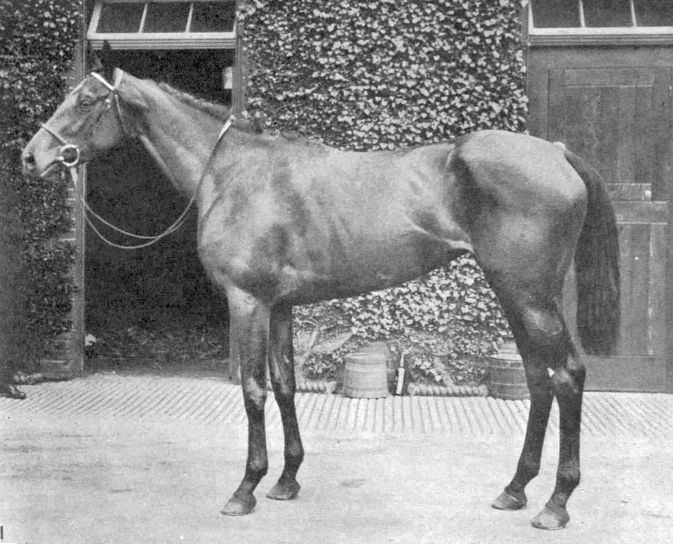
- Pillion in 1926.
- Sire: Chaucer
- Grandsire: St Simon
- Dam: Double Back
- Damsire: Bachelor's Double
- Sex: Mare
- Foaled: 1923
- Country: United Kingdom
- Colour: Bay
- Breeder: Anthony Gustav de Rothschild
- Owner: Anthony Gustav de Rothschild
- Trainer: John Watson
- Record: 8: 3-3-0

Major wins
- 1000 Guineas (1926)

Pillion (1923 – 1940) was a British Thoroughbred racehorse and broodmare. As a juvenile in 1925 she showed promising form by winning once and finishing second in three races including the Rous Memorial Stakes and the Cheveley Park Stakes. On her three-year-old debut she recorded a 25/1 upset victory in the 1000 Guineas. She was retired from racing at the end of the season and had some influence as a broodmare.

== Background ==
Pillion was a bay mare bred and owned by Anthony Gustav de Rothschild. She was set into training with John Watson at the Palace House stable in Newmarket in Suffolk.

Her sire Chaucer won the Gimcrack Stakes as a juvenile in 1902, and later proved himself a high-class performer in handicap races. As a breeding stallion he sired the 1000 Guineas winner Canyon and was the damsire of Fairway, Hyperion, Pharos and Sickle. Pillion's dam Double Back also produced the Coventry Stakes winner Reflector and was a descendant of the influential broodmare Sunray.

== Racing career ==
=== 1925: two-year-old season ===
In 1925 Pillion recorded her only win from five starts at Nottingham Racecourse in summer when she won the £1,000 Nottinghamshire Breeders' Foal Plate. In the Rous Memorial Stakes at Goodwood Racecourse in July she ran well but was no match for the colt Coronach. In October, Pillion finished second to Karra in the Cheveley Park Stakes over six furlongs at Newmarket Racecourse. In her two other races that year the filly finished second in the Houghton Stakes and ran fourth in the Champion Breeders' Foal Stakes at Derby.

In the Free Handicap, ranking of the year's best two-year-olds, Pillion was placed in joint 24th place, fourteen pounds behind the top-rated Colorado.

=== 1926: three-year-old season ===
On 30 April Pillion, ridden by Dick Perryman, started a 25/1 outsider in a twenty-nine runner field for the 113th running of the 1000 Guineas over the Rowley Mile course at Newmarket Racecourse. Karra started favourite but made no impact as Pillion went to the front a quarter of a mile from the finish and won "nicely" by a length from Trilogy with half a length back to Short Story in third.

In the Oaks Stakes over one and a half miles at Epsom Racecourse a month later Pillion started 11/2 second favourite but after disputing the lead until the final turn she tired in the last quarter mile and finished fifth of the sixteen runners behind Short Story. Later that year, the filly reportedly won the Stewards Handicap at Nottingham.

== Assessment and honours ==
In their book, A Century of Champions, based on the Timeform rating system, John Randall and Tony Morris rated Pillion an "inferior" winner of the 1000 Guineas.

== Breeding record ==
At the end of her racing career, Pillion was retired to become a broodmare. She produced at least three foals between 1932 and 1938:

- Tandem, a bay colt, foaled in 1932, sired by Tetratema
- Magic Carpet, chesnut gelding, 1937, by Miracle
- Pilch, bay filly, 1938, by Windsor Lad. Dam of Aldborough (Doncaster Cup) and granddam of Kythnos (Irish 2000 Guineas).

Pillion was euthanised in 1940 after being barren since 1938.

== Pedigree ==
Pedigree of Pillion (GB), bay mare, 1923
| Sire Chaucer (GB) 1900 | St Simon (GB); 1881 | Galopin | Vedette |
| Sire Chaucer (GB) 1900 | St Simon (GB); 1881 | Galopin | Flying Duchess |
| Sire Chaucer (GB) 1900 | St Simon (GB); 1881 | St Angela | King Tom |
| Sire Chaucer (GB) 1900 | St Simon (GB); 1881 | St Angela | Adeline |
| Sire Chaucer (GB) 1900 | Canterbury Pilgrim (GB); 1893 | Tristan | Hermit |
| Sire Chaucer (GB) 1900 | Canterbury Pilgrim (GB); 1893 | Tristan | Thrift |
| Sire Chaucer (GB) 1900 | Canterbury Pilgrim (GB); 1893 | Pilgrimage | The Palmer |
| Sire Chaucer (GB) 1900 | Canterbury Pilgrim (GB); 1893 | Pilgrimage | Lady Audley |
| Dam Double Back (IRE) 1913 | Bachelor's Double (IRE); 1906 | Tredennis (GB) | Kendal |
| Dam Double Back (IRE) 1913 | Bachelor's Double (IRE); 1906 | Tredennis (GB) | St Marguerite |
| Dam Double Back (IRE) 1913 | Bachelor's Double (IRE); 1906 | Lady Bawn | Le Noir (GB) |
| Dam Double Back (IRE) 1913 | Bachelor's Double (IRE); 1906 | Lady Bawn | Milady (GB) |
| Dam Double Back (IRE) 1913 | Will Return (GB); 1908 | William the Third | St Simon |
| Dam Double Back (IRE) 1913 | Will Return (GB); 1908 | William the Third | Gravity |
| Dam Double Back (IRE) 1913 | Will Return (GB); 1908 | Recall | Retreat |
| Dam Double Back (IRE) 1913 | Will Return (GB); 1908 | Recall | Spring Ray (Family 1-i) |

- Pillion was inbred 2 × 4 to St Simon, meaning that this stallion appears in both the second and fourth generations of her pedigree.
