= Felicitation =

British-bred Thoroughbred racehorse

- Sire: Colorado
- Grandsire: Phalaris
- Dam: Felicita
- Damsire: Cantilever
- Sex: Stallion
- Foaled: 1930
- Country: United Kingdom
- Colour: Bay
- Breeder: Aga Khan III
- Owner: Aga Khan III
- Trainer: Frank Butters
- Record: 23: 8-3-4
- Earnings: £14,575

Major wins
- Middle Park Stakes (1932); Churchill Stakes (1934); Ascot Gold Cup (1934); John Porter Stakes (1934); Jockey Club Cup (1934); Yorkshire Cup (1935)

Felicitation (foaled 1930) was a British Thoroughbred racehorse and sire. A specialist stayer, owned and bred by the Aga Khan he was best known for his emphatic victory over a very strong international field in the 1934 Ascot Gold Cup. He was one of the best two-year-olds of his generation in England in 1932 when he was awarded the Middle Park Stakes on the disqualification of Manitoba. He failed to win in eight starts as a three-year-old but ran well to finish second in to Hyperion in the St Leger. In the summer of 1934 he established himself as one of the best horses in Europe by winning the Ascot Gold Cup, John Porter Stakes and Jockey Club Cup as well as finishing third in the Prix de l'Arc de Triomphe. He was injured when winning the Yorkshire Cup as a five-year-old and was retired from racing. He stood as a breeding stallion in England and Brazil with moderate results.

== Background ==
Felicitation was a bay horse with a white star bred in the United Kingdom by his owner the Aga Khan. He was probably the best horse sired in a brief stud career by Colorado who won the 2000 Guineas in 1926 and the Eclipse Stakes in 1927. His dam Felicita was closely related to The Derby winner Papyrus. The colt was sent into training with the Aga Khan's veteran trainer Frank Butters at his stable in Newmarket, Suffolk.

== Racing career ==
=== 1932: two-year-old season ===
After being beaten in his first three races, including a second place at Goodwood, Felicitation recorded his first success in the Autumn Foal Plate at Newbury Racecourse. He was then moved up in class and started at odds of 3/1 for the Middle Park Stakes at Newmarket Racecourse in October and finished second to Manitoba. After the race however, Felictation's connections lodged a protest against the winner for causing interference ("crossing") and Manitoba was disqualified by the racecourse stewards. Felicitation was well-fancied for the Dewhurst Stakes later that month but finished fourth of the six runners behind Hyperion.

=== 1933: three-year-old season ===
Felicitation took time to find his best form in 1933 and was well beaten in his early races. He finished unplaced in the Free Handicap at Newmarket in April, seventh in the 2000 Guineas and fourth when favourite for the Newmarket Stakes in May. On 31 May, ridden by Charlie Elliott, he ran in The Derby but made no impact and finished sixteenth in a race won by Hyperion. He went on to finish fourth in the King Edward VII Stakes in June and fourth in the Royal Plate at Newbury Racecourse.

Felicitation began to improve in the autumn of 1933. In the St Leger at Doncaster Racecourse he was no match for Hyperion, who led from the start and won easily, but he finished strongly to take second place, three lengths behind the winner. On his final appearance of the season he finished second again in the Jockey Club Stakes over fourteen furlongs at Newmarket.

=== 1934: four-year-old season ===
On his debut as a four-year-old, Felicitation finished third behind Hyperion and Angelico in the March Stakes at Newmarket on 3 May. In an attempt to improve the colt's attitude he was tried with blinkers in training. The experiment was successful, and he wore the headgear in his subsequent races. On 20 June at Royal Ascot the colt recorded his first win for more than twenty months when he led from the start and drew of his opponents in the straight to win the two-mile Churchill Stakes by ten lengths from Solar Boy with Angelico in third. On the following day he started at odds of 9/2 for the Ascot Gold Cup, in which his opponents included Hyperion, Thor (Prix du Jockey Club), the Italian colt Crapom (Prix de l'Arc de Triomphe) and the American challenger Mate. Ridden by Gordon Richards, Felicitation took the lead from the start, dominated the race, and won "in a common canter" by eight lengths from Thor with Hyperion in third. In August, Felicitation took his third consecutive win when he took the Eglington Plate at Ayr Racecourse.

In September, Felicitation started odds-on favourite for the John Porter Stakes at Newbury and won from Cecil. In October he was sent to France to contest the fifteenth running of the Prix de l'Arc de Triomphe over 2400 metres on heavy ground at Longchamp Racecourse. He took an early lead and maintained his advantage into the straight before being overtaken and finishing third of the thirteen runners behind Brantôme and Assuerus. On his final appearance of the season he won the Jockey Club Cup over two and a quarter miles at Newmarket by ten lengths from Armour Bright at odds of 1/4.

Felicitation ended the year with earnings of £9,255 making him the third most financially successful horse of the season in Britain behind the three-year-old Windsor Lad and the two-year-old Bahram.

The Aga Khan had intended that Felicitation would be retired to stud at the end of 1934. He was scheduled to begin his career as a breeding stallion at the Egerton Stud at a fee of 250 guineas. Before the end of the year, however, these plans were revised and it was announced that the horse would stay in training. The Aga Khan reportedly felt that Felicitation had not shown his best form at Longchamp and planned to match him against Brantôme and Windsor Lad in the 1935 Ascot Gold Cup.

=== 1935: five-year-old season ===
Felicitation returned as a five-year-old in 1935 with the Gold Cup as his objective. Te prospect of a showdown between Felicitation, Brantôme and Windsor Lad created great interest, with bookmakers publishing ante-post odds from the race as early as February. Felicitation began his fourth season by finishing third to Tai-Yang and Tiberius in the Chippenham Stakes over one and a half miles at Newmarket in early May. He recorded his final major success later that month when he won the Yorkshire Cup over two miles at York Racecourse. He sustained an injury in the race and did not race contest the Gold Cup, which was won by Tiberius. His retirement from racing was announced shortly afterwards.

== Assessment ==
In the 1932 Free Handicap, a rating of the best two-year-olds to race in Britain, Felicitation was assigned a weight of 123 pounds making him the eighth best juvenile of the season and the fourth best two-year-old colt. The three top rated horses Myrobella, Betty and Brown Betty were all fillies whilst the others rated ahead of Felicitation were Manitoba, Hyperion, Jim Thomas and Supervisor (another filly).

In their book A Century of Champions, based on a modified version of the Timeform system, John Randall and Tony Morris rated Felicitation the one hundred and twentieth best racehorse of twentieth century, the fifty-second best horse of the century to have been trained in Britain and Ireland, and the second best horse foaled in 1930 behind Hyperion.

== Stud record ==
Felicitation began his career as a breeding stallion at the Highclere Stud at a fee of 198 guineas. He stood in England for several years before being sold and exported to Brazil in 1945. The best of his British offspring was Morogoro (foaled in 1938), who won the Craven Stakes and finished second in both the 2000 Guineas and the Derby in 1941. His last foals were born in 1949.

== Pedigree ==
Pedigree of Felicitation (GB), bay stallion, 1930
Sire Colorado (GB) 1923	Phalaris (GB); 1913	Polymelus	Cyllene
Sire Colorado (GB) 1923	Phalaris (GB); 1913	Polymelus	Maid Marian
Sire Colorado (GB) 1923	Phalaris (GB); 1913	Bromus	Sainfoin
Sire Colorado (GB) 1923	Phalaris (GB); 1913	Bromus	Cheery
Sire Colorado (GB) 1923	Canyon (GB); 1913	Chaucer	St Simon
Sire Colorado (GB) 1923	Canyon (GB); 1913	Chaucer	Canterbury Pilgrim
Sire Colorado (GB) 1923	Canyon (GB); 1913	Glasalt	Isinglass
Sire Colorado (GB) 1923	Canyon (GB); 1913	Glasalt	Broad Corrie
Dam Felicita (GB) 1923	Cantilever (GB); 1910	Bridge of Canny	Love Wisely
Dam Felicita (GB) 1923	Cantilever (GB); 1910	Bridge of Canny	Santa Brigida
Dam Felicita (GB) 1923	Cantilever (GB); 1910	Lighthead	Zealot
Dam Felicita (GB) 1923	Cantilever (GB); 1910	Lighthead	Whitelock
Dam Felicita (GB) 1923	Best Wishes (GB); 1913	Neil Gow	Marco
Dam Felicita (GB) 1923	Best Wishes (GB); 1913	Neil Gow	Chelandry
Dam Felicita (GB) 1923	Best Wishes (GB); 1913	Simonath	St Simon
Dam Felicita (GB) 1923	Best Wishes (GB); 1913	Simonath	Philomath (Family:16-f)
