= Fifinella =

Mascot of the U.S. Women Airforce Service Pilots (WASP) in World War II

Fifinella, the Women Airforce Service Pilots (WASP) mascot, created by The Walt Disney Company.

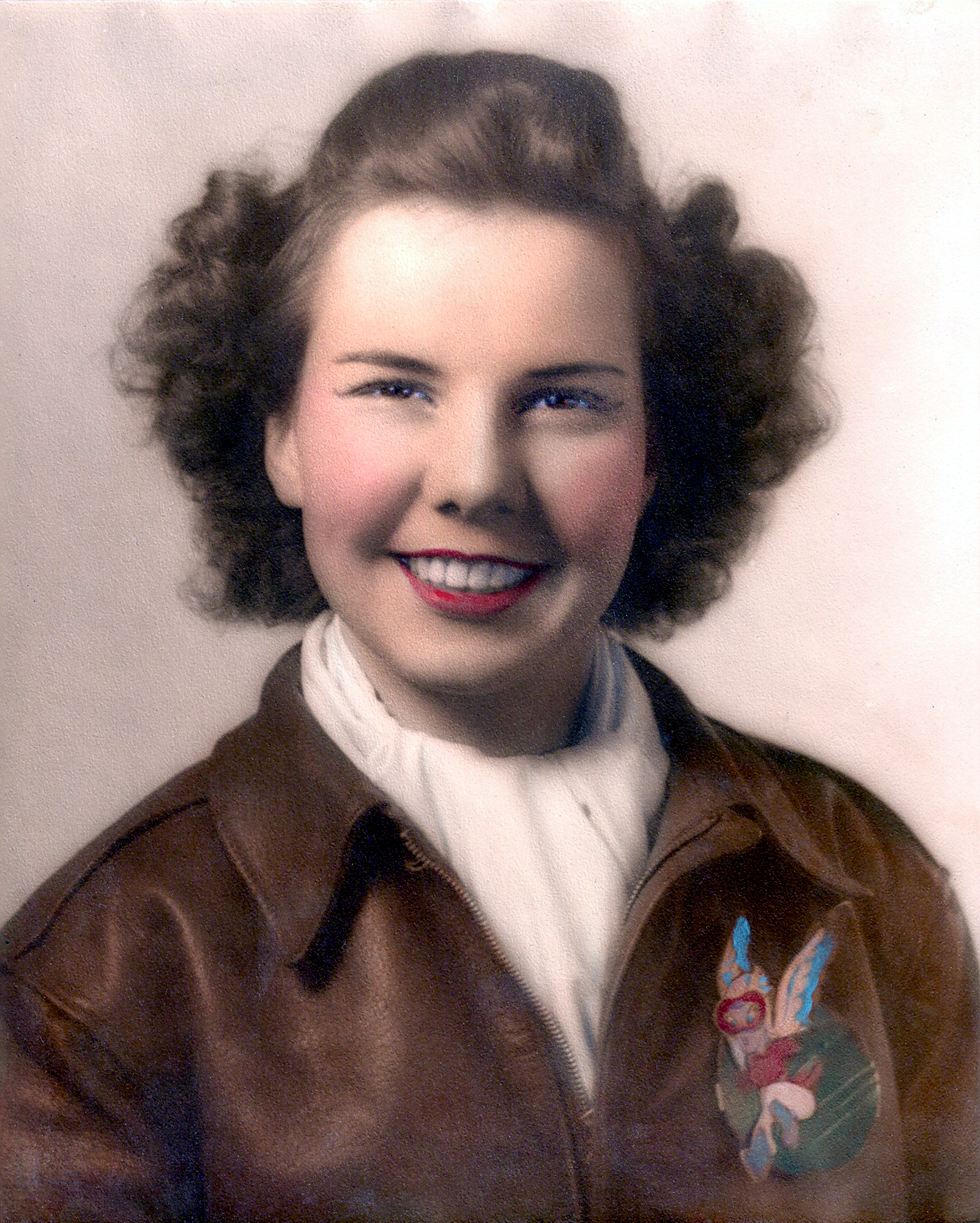
WASP Dorothy Olsen wears an A-2 jacket with a Fifinella patch

Fifinella was a female gremlin designed by Walt Disney for a proposed film from Roald Dahl's book The Gremlins. During World War II, the Women Airforce Service Pilots (WASP) asked permission to use the image as their official mascot, and the Disney Company granted them the rights.

== Origins ==
The story of Fifinella began in 1942 when Roald Dahl, who had been removed from flying with the RAF due to injury, wrote The Gremlins, a fairy tale about the hazards of combat flying; in this incarnation, the word "fifinella" only refers to female gremlins as opposed to any specific one. Dahl took the name from the great "flying" filly, Fifinella, who won The Derby and Epsom Oaks in 1916, the year Dahl was born. As an RAF-trained pilot, he was familiar with prewar RAF folklore about the Gremlin, the mischievous source of any unknown problem. Although gremlins predated Murphy's Law that "whatever can go wrong, will go wrong," they were obviously motivated by the same principles.

== The Gremlins ==
The Gremlins is a children's book, written by Roald Dahl. It was published in 1943 by Random House for Walt Disney and serialized in Cosmopolitan. It was Dahl's first children's book, and was written for Walt Disney Productions, as a promotional device for a feature-length animated film that was never made. (Note: Dahl claimed that the gremlins were exclusively a Royal Air Force icon, but the elf-like figures had a very convoluted origin that predated his original writings.) With Dahl's assistance, a series of gremlin characters was developed, and although pre-production began, the film project was eventually abandoned, in part because the studio could not establish the precise rights of the "gremlin" story, and in part because the British Air Ministry, which was heavily involved in the production because Dahl was on leave from his wartime Washington posting, insisted on final approval of script and production. (Note: Dahl was given permission by the Air Ministry to work in Hollywood and an arrangement had been made that all proceeds from the film would be split between the RAF Benevolent Fund and Dahl.)

The publication of The Gremlins by Random House consisted of a 50,000 run for the U.S. market (Note: Both paperback and hardcover versions were printed in 1943.) with Dahl ordering 50 copies for himself as promotional material, handing them out to everyone he knew, including Lord Halifax and First Lady Eleanor Roosevelt, who read the book to her grandchildren. The book was considered an international success with 30,000 more sold in Australia but initial efforts to reprint the book were precluded by a wartime paper shortage. Reviewed in major publications, Dahl was considered a writer-of-note and his appearances in Hollywood to follow up with the film project were met with notices in Hedda Hopper's columns. (Note: In 1950, Collins Publishing (New York) published a limited reprint of The Gremlins.)

Facing copyright problems and realizing that the Air Ministry's "Clause 12" in the original film contract would restrict the studio, Walt Disney, who had a personal interest in The Gremlins, reluctantly began to "wind down" the project. By August 1943, Disney had even reconsidered an animated "short" based on The Gremlins and indicated to Dahl by correspondence that further work would not continue. After a year of story conferences and related research, Dahl realized that his book would be the only tangible product emanating from the aborted film.

== Design ==
The original design had the small winged figure coming in for a landing with a red circle in the background; she is portrayed with horns, a yellow flight cap, a red top, yellow slacks, long black gloves, red high-top boots, and goggles. The WASPs, however, rather than having the figure in a landing pose, added a large bomb astride which the figure sat. They dressed her in a red coat and purple trousers and added a dark blue circle for extra impact. Still, there were many custom patches made, so form and color varied from patch to patch.

== Use ==
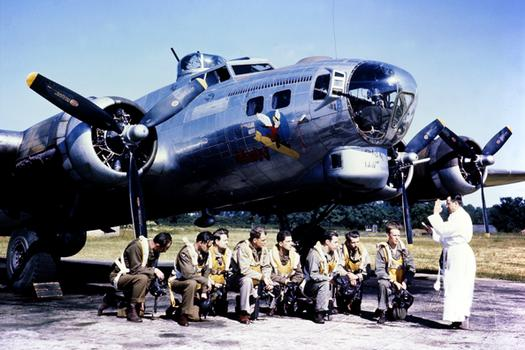
B-17G Flying Fortress, 91st Bomb Group has nose art of a Fifinella on it.

Dahl's gremlins were subsequently used by Warner Bros. in several World War II cartoons, some involving Bugs Bunny and another called Russian Rhapsody, which featured scores of Russian-accented "Gremlins from the Kremlin" attacking an aircraft piloted by Adolf Hitler.

Fifinella put in appearances on WASP flight jackets and in many variations on the noses of bombers. One B-17G Flying Fortress, Fifinella (Serial #42-107030) of the 91st Bomb Group, was named after her. Fifinella was lost on August 13, 1944, on a bombing raid at Le Manoir, France. During the Korean War there was also a B-29 Superfortress (Serial #42-6569) of the 19th Bomb Group named Fifinella.

== See also ==
- Gremlin
- Women Airforce Service Pilots
