= T. Hee =

American film director

- Born: Thornton Francis Hee; March 26, 1911; Oklahoma City, Oklahoma U.S.
- Died: October 30, 1988 (aged 77); Montana U.S.
- Occupation: Animator
- Employer(s): Leon Schlesinger Productions (1936–1938); Walt Disney Productions (1938–1946, 1958–1961); Walter Lantz Productions (1946–1951); UPA (1951–1958); Hal Roach Studios (1953); Terrytoons (1961–1963); WED Enterprises (1964-?)
- Spouse: Patti Arthur Price
- Children: 2

Thornton Hee (March 26, 1911 – October 30, 1988), commonly known as T. Hee, was an American animator, director, and teacher. He taught character design and caricature.

== Career ==
Hee started his career at the Hal Roach Studios at Metro-Goldwyn-Mayer drawing caricatures of studio staff and stars for the publicity department. He worked for Leon Schlesinger at Warner Bros. Cartoons from 1936 to 1938 as a character designer. He designed many of the celebrity caricatures used in The CooCoo Nut Grove (1936) and The Woods Are Full of Cuckoos (1937). A 1936 Christmas card that he drew, featuring caricatures of the Schlesinger animators, was used to design the gremlins in the 1944 animated short Russian Rhapsody.

Hee joined Walt Disney Productions' animation unit in 1938. His first job was to draw caricatures of Hollywood stars for the Oscar-nominated short Mother Goose Goes Hollywood (1938). He later directed the Honest John and his sidekick Gideon the Cat sequence in Pinocchio (1940). He is most recognized for co-directing the Dance of the Hours segment of Fantasia. He left Disney in 1939, but returned to work there from 1940 to 1946. During this period he prepared the titles for The Reluctant Dragon (1941) and worked on the stories for Victory Through Air Power (1943) and Make Mine Music (1946). He left Disney and worked for United Productions of America as a writer-designer on several Gerald McBoing-Boing and Christopher Crumpet shorts. Hee provided the illustrations during the opening credits of The Life of Riley television show of the 1950s. He also worked on two of Frank Capra's educational films for The Bell System Science Series: Hemo the Magnificent and The Strange Case of the Cosmic Rays (both 1957).

He returned to Disney again from 1958 to 1961, working on the short Noah's Ark (1959) and The Shaggy Dog. Hee also worked for Terrytoons (1961 to 1963). In 1964, he joined WED Enterprises working on projects at Disneyland and Walt Disney World as well as at the 1964 New York World's Fair.

From 1948, he taught at the Chouinard Art Institute in Los Angeles, where he briefly became department chairman. Hee was also one of the co-founders, with Jack Hannah, of the Character Animation program at the California Institute of the Arts. He later served as chairman of the Film Arts Department.

He was head of the Short Films branch of the Academy of Motion Picture Arts and Sciences and was also chairman of its student film awards. He served on the Board of Governors from 1971 to 1982.
