= Fifinella (horse) =

British-bred Thoroughbred racehorse

- Sire: Polymelus
- Grandsire: Cyllene
- Dam: Silver Fowl
- Damsire: Wildfowler
- Sex: Mare
- Foaled: 1913
- Country: United Kingdom of Great Britain and Ireland
- Colour: Chestnut
- Breeder: Sir Edward Hulton
- Owner: Sir Edward Hulton
- Trainer: Dick Dawson
- Record: 7: 4-2-1
- Earnings: £5,937

Major wins
- Cheveley Park Stakes (1915); New Derby (1916); New Oaks (1916)

Awards
- Unofficial British Champion Two-Year-Old (1915)
- Last updated on 23 October 2011

Fifinella (1913–1931) was a British Thoroughbred racehorse and broodmare. In a career that lasted from 1915 until 1917 she ran seven times and won four races. She was the highest-rated British two-year-old of either sex in 1915 and went on to greater success the following season. As a three-year-old in 1916 she won the Derby and Oaks both of which were run that year at Newmarket. She was the sixth and most recent filly to win the Derby.

== Background ==
Fifinella a chestnut filly with a narrow white blaze and two white socks, was bred by her owner, the publisher Edward Hulton. She was sired by Polymelus out of the mare, Silver Fowl. Polymelus was a highly successful racehorse who won the Champion Stakes and the Cambridgeshire in 1906 before going on to be a five time Champion Sire and, through his son Phalaris, the male-line ancestor of most modern thoroughbreds. Silver Fowl was a highly successful broodmare who produced ten other winners including Silver Tag (Cambridgeshire), Silvern (Coronation Cup) and Tai-Yang (Jockey Club Stakes).

Fifinella was sent into training at Newmarket, Suffolk, with Richard C. Dawson who at that time was Hulton's private trainer. Or so the "official" story has stated for over fifty years. The truth is slightly different. Hulton had several trainers over the years but they were always public. After the retirement of Richard Wootton he kept some horses with Wootton's sons but the bulk went to Dawson at Whatcombe. At the end of the 1916 season Hulton and Dawson parted company and Fifinella and the rest of the Hulton string left Whatcombe and went briefly to Billy Walters at Newmarket. Walters tried without much success to bring Fifinella to the racecourse throughout 1917 though she managed to run third to Phalaris in a little plate at Newmarket on 14 September. For what it's worth Dawson himself was briefly based at Newmarket in 1918 but this was long after Fifinella's time. She was not an easy or pleasant filly to train, being described by Dawson as "catty and peevish".

== 1915: two-year-old season ==
As a two-year-old Fifinella, ridden by Steve Donoghue, won two of her three races, all of which were run at Newmarket. She began her career with an easy win in the Fulbourne Stakes (beating the King's colt Marconi). In the Bibury Club Stakes she was beaten a head by Telephone Girl, to whom she was conceding ten pounds. As Telephone Girl had given weight and a beating to the leading colt Argos, Fifinella's form looked very strong. On her final start of the year she won the Cheveley Park Stakes by eight lengths. In the Free Handicap, a ranking of the best British two-year-olds, Fifinella was rated the best juvenile of 1915.

== 1916: three-year-old season ==
As a three-year-old, Fifinella was ridden by Joe Childs. On her debut she was made odds-on favourite for the 1000 Guineas over one mile at Newmarket on 5 May. She was unco-operative before the race and Childs struck her hard with his whip. The filly responded badly and did not show her best form in the race, being beaten three quarters of a length by Canyon.

When the original entries for the 1916 Derby were made, Fifinella had not been entered. The outbreak of war in 1914 however, led to the race, and all the entries, being cancelled and then re-opened when it was agreed to run a substitute race at Newmarket. Fifinella was therefore eligible for the race which was run on 29 May. Fifinella started at odds of 11/2 against nine colts in front of a smaller crowd than usual. She produced a strong late run along the rails to win by a neck from Kwang-Su, with Nassovian a head further back in third. The Derby win by the "flying filly" was the third in eight years by a female, following Signorinetta (1908) and Tagalie (1912).

Two days later, over the same course and distance, Fifinella started 8/13 favourite in a field of seven for the "New Oaks". She won "in a canter" by five lengths from Salamandra, with Market Girl third. The impressive winning time of 2:35.0 was 1.6 faster than that she had recorded when winning the Derby.

Hopes for a September meeting between Fifinella and the year's best colt Hurry On in a Newmarket substitute "St Leger" were not fulfilled as the filly went "amiss" and was unable to run. As a four-year-old in the Autumn of the following year, with Vic Smyth up, she finished third of three runners behind Phalaris in the Bury St Edmunds Plate at Newmarket beaten by six and three-quarter lengths.

== Breeding record ==
Fifinella was retired to her owners stud, where she remained until 1928 when she was sold for 12,000 guineas to Lord Woolavington. She was a successful broodmare, despite her tendency to pass on her difficult temperament, producing six winners. The best of her offspring was the colt Press Gang who won the Middle Park and the Princess of Wales's Stakes. Fifinella died in late April 1931 after giving birth to a filly by Hurry On. One of her modern direct descendants was the multiple Grade I National Hunt winner Oscar Whisky.

== Assessment ==
In their book A Century of Champions, John Randall and Tony Morris rated Fifinella the eighth best British-trained filly of the 20th Century.

== Popular culture ==
Author Roald Dahl, born the year of Fifinella's great racing successes, used her name for his female characters in his 1943 book, The Gremlins. The character's image, designed by Walt Disney, became the mascot of the Women Airforce Service Pilots, who called themselves the "Order of Fifinella".

== Pedigree ==
Pedigree of Fifinella (GB), chestnut mare, 1913
Sire Polymelus (GB) 1902	Cyllene; 1895	Bona Vista	Bend Or
Sire Polymelus (GB) 1902	Cyllene; 1895	Bona Vista	Vista
Sire Polymelus (GB) 1902	Cyllene; 1895	Arcadia	Isonomy*
Sire Polymelus (GB) 1902	Cyllene; 1895	Arcadia	Distant Shore
Sire Polymelus (GB) 1902	Maid Marian; 1886	Hampton	Lord Clifden
Sire Polymelus (GB) 1902	Maid Marian; 1886	Hampton	Lady Langden
Sire Polymelus (GB) 1902	Maid Marian; 1886	Quiver	Toxophilite
Sire Polymelus (GB) 1902	Maid Marian; 1886	Quiver	Young Melbourne mare
Dam Silver Fowl (GB) 1904	Wildfowler; 1895	Gallinule	Isonomy*
Dam Silver Fowl (GB) 1904	Wildfowler; 1895	Gallinule	Moorhen
Dam Silver Fowl (GB) 1904	Wildfowler; 1895	Tragedy	Ben Battle
Dam Silver Fowl (GB) 1904	Wildfowler; 1895	Tragedy	The White Witch
Dam Silver Fowl (GB) 1904	L’Argent; 1893	Jacobite	Rosicrucian
Dam Silver Fowl (GB) 1904	L’Argent; 1893	Jacobite	Twine the Plaiden
Dam Silver Fowl (GB) 1904	L’Argent; 1893	Aura	Umpire
Dam Silver Fowl (GB) 1904	L’Argent; 1893	Aura	Somnambula (Family: 3-i)

- Fifinella was inbred 4x4 to Isonomy. This means that the stallion appears twice in the fourth generation of her pedigree.
