= Bugs & Daffy: The Wartime Cartoons =

1989 direct-to-video program

- VHS cover
- Produced by: Ralph Tribbey
- Starring: Mel Blanc (voice)
- Edited by: Johen Bohn
- Distributed by: MGM/UA Home Video
- Release date: March 7, 1989
- Running time: 90 minutes
- Country: United States
- Language: English

Bugs & Daffy: The Wartime Cartoons is a 1989 direct-to-video program by MGM/UA Home Video, containing 11 Looney Tunes and Merrie Melodies shorts, all of which are centered on World War II. Film critic Leonard Maltin (Entertainment Tonight) tells trivia and facts about each animated short.

== Features ==
#	Title	Release date	Director	DVD availability
1	The Weakly Reporter	March 25, 1944	Chuck Jones	Looney Tunes Golden Collection: Volume 6
2	Draftee Daffy	January 27, 1945	Bob Clampett	Looney Tunes Golden Collection: Volume 3
3	Super-Rabbit	April 3, 1943	Chuck Jones	Looney Tunes Golden Collection: Volume 3
4	The Fifth-Column Mouse (Note: Public domain in the United States)	March 6, 1943	Friz Freleng	Looney Tunes Golden Collection: Volume 6
5	Falling Hare	October 30, 1943	Bob Clampett	Looney Tunes Golden Collection: Volume 3
6	Daffy – The Commando	November 20, 1943	Friz Freleng	Looney Tunes Golden Collection: Volume 6
7	Swooner Crooner	May 6, 1944	Frank Tashlin	Looney Tunes Golden Collection: Volume 3
8	Little Red Riding Rabbit	January 8, 1944	Friz Freleng	Looney Tunes Golden Collection: Volume 2
9	Plane Daffy	September 16, 1944	Frank Tashlin	Looney Tunes Golden Collection: Volume 4
10	Herr Meets Hare	January 13, 1945	Friz Freleng	Looney Tunes Golden Collection: Volume 6
11	Russian Rhapsody	May 20, 1944	Bob Clampett	Looney Tunes Golden Collection: Volume 6

== Voice cast ==
- Mel Blanc: Bugs Bunny, The Gremlins from the Kremlin, Daffy Duck, Porky Pig, additional voices (archive footage)
- Billy Bletcher: Wolf (archive footage)
- Sara Berner: Hatta Mari (archive footage)
- Bea Benaderet: Little Red Riding Hood, additional voices (archive footage)
- Richard Bickenbach: Crosby rooster (archive footage)
- Robert C. Bruce: Radio announcer, Narrator (archive footage)
- Kent Rogers: Professor Canafrazz (archive footage)
- Tedd Pierce: Observer (archive footage)
