= Some Time Never: A Fable for Supermen =

1948 novel by Roald Dahl

- First edition (US)
- Author: Roald Dahl
- Language: English
- Genre: Fantasy novel, Satire
- Publisher: Scribner's (United States); Collins (UK)
- Publication date: 1948
- Publication place: United States
- Media type: Print (Hardback)
- Pages: 244 pp

Some Time Never: A Fable for Supermen is a 1948 book by Roald Dahl, his first adult novel. Dahl began writing it after editor Maxwell Perkins expressed an interest in publishing a novel-length book if Dahl were to write it. The book was a critical failure, although it is historically noteworthy as one of the first novels about nuclear war to be published after the atomic bombings of Hiroshima and Nagasaki. The story is a darker take on the same premise as Dahl's first book for children, The Gremlins.

== Synopsis ==
In 1943, RAF pilot Peternip discovers a gremlin or miniature being, drilling holes on the wing of his aircraft, so he sets off with his squadron to unearth the story behind them. Many years ago gremlins were the rulers of the world, but they were forced underground by the spread of humanity and have spent the time since then planning their revenge. They briefly emerge during the Battle of Britain, but the experience makes them decide that mankind would destroy itself without their intervention. The gremlins wait until the time is right - after World War III and World War IV decimate the earth, they emerge and take over the world. The story ends with the gremlins, unable to exist in a world without humans, disappearing too; finally, only the worm remains.

== Reception ==
Sometime Never was met with mostly negative reviews, but did receive some praise from the Glasgow Herald and The Saturday Review.

== Editions ==
The work was first published by Scribner's in the United States in 1948 under the title Some Time Never: A Fable for Supermen. The UK edition, entitled simply Sometime Never, was published by Collins in 1949. The final chapter of the UK version was revised slightly to elaborate on the ultimate disappearance of the Gremlins.

As of 2026, the work has never been reprinted in English, although a Dutch translation (Ooit en te nimmer) has run through several editions.
