= The Weakly Reporter =

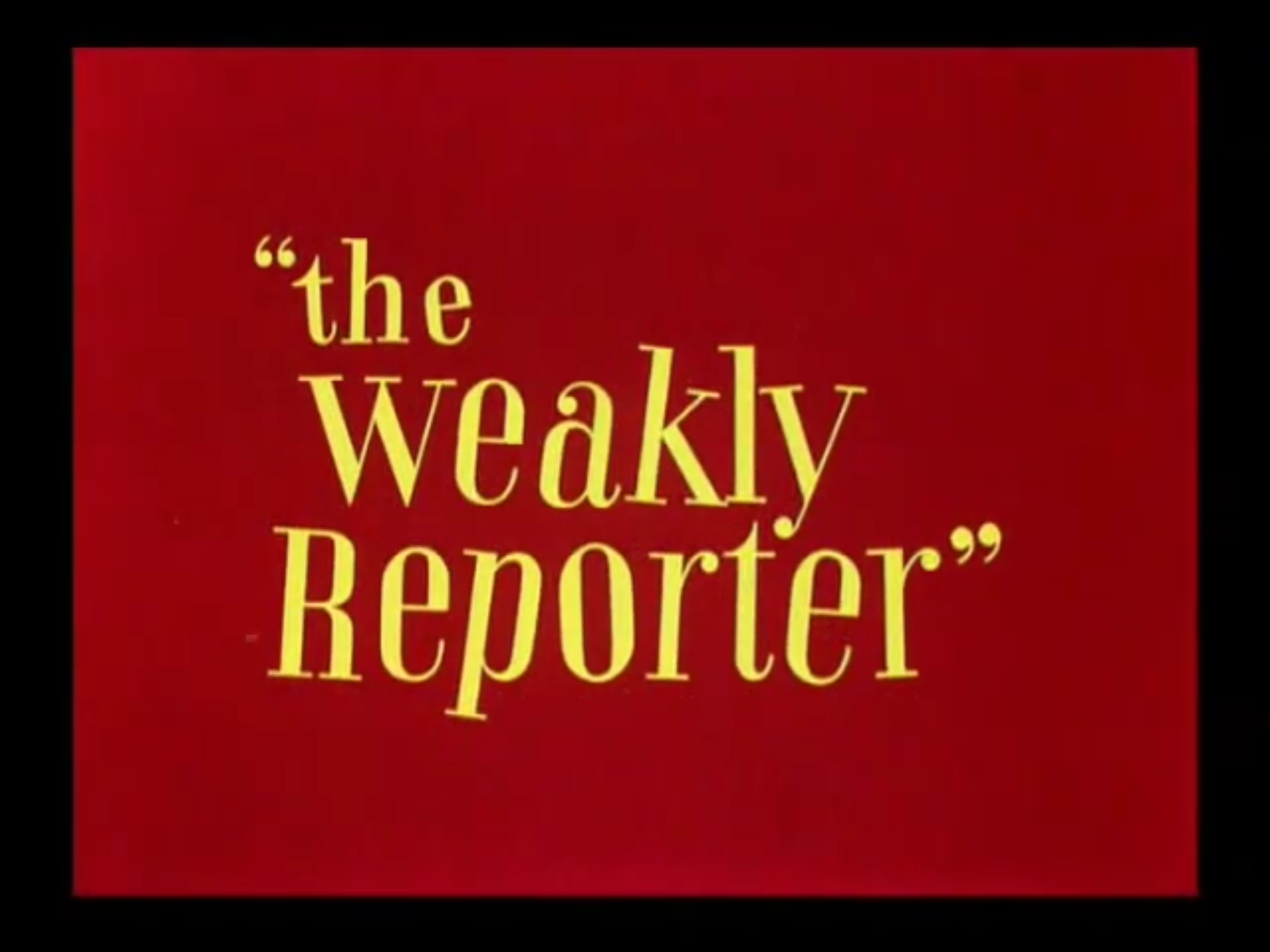
- Title card
- Directed by: Charles M. Jones
- Story by: Michael Maltese
- Produced by: Leon Schlesinger
- Narrated by: Robert C. Bruce
- Music by: Carl W. Stalling
- Animation by: Ben Washam
- Color process: Technicolor
- Production company: Leon Schlesinger Productions
- Distributed by: Warner Bros. Pictures; The Vitaphone Corporation
- Release date: March 25, 1944 (US)
- Running time: 7 minutes
- Language: English

The Weakly Reporter is a Warner Bros. cartoon released on March 25, 1944. Directed by Chuck Jones, written by Michael Maltese, and with music directed by Carl Stalling, this cartoon is a spoof of sacrifices made by those on the homefront during World War II.

== Plot ==
The opening sequence is set to My Country, 'Tis Of Thee and shows the Statue of Liberty and the presidents of Mount Rushmore in wartime garbs, such as air raid wardens and civil defense personnel. An uncredited Frank Graham is the narrator.

The second sequence, to the tune of California, Here I Come, states that Florida loves California "for the duration". Several scenes following, set to the tune of In My Merry Oldsmobile, deal with the lack of automobile traffic. One of those scenes shows a policeman chasing someone only to zoom out to show a foot chase. The policeman makes a reference to early race car driver Barney Oldfield.

To the tune of Memories, a scene shows a trio of armored car guards carrying a pound of butter, while the next scene shows a lady at a butcher shop asking if the butcher has Porterhouse steak. The butcher replies, "We certainly do ma'am." and allows the lady to sniff the beef, then charges her $1.19 (equal to $21.76 today) for the privilege of sniffing.

The cartoon then switches to a man tossing and turning in bed and, to the tune of A Cup Of Coffee, A Sandwich And You, discusses the rationing of coffee, both before and after rationing. The sequence after that deals with hoarding, and to the tune of Yankee Doodle, says about war bonds, "You can't hoard too many of these!" A scene, to the tune of Oh, You Beautiful Doll, deals with women regularly visiting beauty salons to improve wartime morale, and one lady is shown wearing a welder's mask as a nod to Rosie the Riveter.

An armed robbery of a jeweler nets an alarm clock. Following sequences deal with feminine intrigue as well as women joining the Army (to the title tune of Captains of the Clouds) and taking jobs vacated by men who have gone off to war. One "feminine intrigue" scene shows a woman with an accent being affectionate to an American man in front of what appears to be a German castle, saying, "I can't go back without them. Please! Please!" As the camera zooms out, the castle is actually on a calendar advertising meat in a butcher shop. The butcher says, "Oh, very well. Here, that will be fifty cents" (equal to $9.14 today) as he wraps two ham steaks up for the woman.

The cartoon closes with scenes dealing with factory workers building ships, planes, and guns faster than they had ever been built before, and features a scene where a female repair person empties her toolbox and starts a stalled machine (and the entire factory) with a hairpin.

The closing scene shows a formally dressed man standing with a woman (who is holding a bottle of champagne) at an empty dry dock, ready to launch a ship. The woman asks the man, "But, where's the boat?" The man replies, "Just start swinging, lady!" As she swings the bottle of champagne, the ship rises out of nowhere, gets struck by the bottle and launches to the tune of Columbia, the Gem of the Ocean. The camera pans to a shack, and then closes in on a shot showing the shack's door window marked "Henry J. Kaiser - Private" and a sign hanging from a nail on the shack's door which read "Back in 2 minutes - out to launch". Iris out.

== Home media ==
The Weakly Reporter can be found uncut, uncensored, and digitally remastered on Disc 2 ("Patriotic Pals") of the Looney Tunes Golden Collection: Volume 6. It was also included on the 1989 MGM Home Video release, "Bugs & Daffy: The Wartime Cartoons".
