= Little Red Riding Rabbit =

1943 film by Isadore Freleng

- Title card
- Directed by: Isadore Freleng
- Story by: Michael Maltese
- Produced by: Leon Schlesinger
- Starring: Mel Blanc; Bea Benaderet (uncredited); Billy Bletcher (uncredited)
- Music by: Carl W. Stalling
- Animation by: Manuel Perez
- Color process: Technicolor
- Production company: Leon Schlesinger Productions
- Distributed by: Warner Bros. Pictures
- Release date: December 30, 1943
- Running time: 7 min
- Country: United States
- Language: English

Little Red Riding Rabbit is a 1943 American animated comedy short film directed by Isadore Freleng. It is part of the Merrie Melodies series and the 24th cartoon to feature Bugs Bunny. It was released on December 30, 1943. It is a parody of the Little Red Riding Hood story, and is the first time in which Mel Blanc receives a voice credit.

In 1994, Little Red Riding Rabbit was voted #39 of the 50 Greatest Cartoons of all time by members of the animation field.

== Plot ==
Red placed over a pile of coals in the cartoon's infamous final scene.

Little Red Riding Hood is depicted as an exaggerated parody of a 1940s teenage girl, a "bobby soxer" with an extremely loud and grating voice (inspired by screen and radio comedian Cass Daley) voiced by Bea Benaderet, bringing a rabbit to her grandmother in a basket. As she skips along singing the first verse of "Five O'Clock Whistle", the rabbit pops out of her basket, revealing himself to be Bugs Bunny.

The "Big Bad Wolf" (voiced by Billy Bletcher) tricks Little Red Riding Hood into taking an unnecessarily long mountain path to her grandmother's house by switching a "Shortcut to Grandma's" sign, and sneaks into her grandmother's house while she is away "working the swing shift at Lockheed". After kicking out a group of rival wolves who are all waiting in the house dressed as Little Red Riding Hood's grandmother, the wolf dresses as her grandmother and climbs into bed, hoping to eat the girl when she arrives.

When Little Red Riding Hood does arrive, she tells her "grandmother" that she brought a rabbit for dinner, prompting the wolf to turn his appetite toward Bugs instead. She then begins to remark on the wolf's large eyes — only to be impatiently interrupted by the wolf, who quickly shuffles her out the door so that he can eat the rabbit. Bugs slips out of the basket and evades the wolf, but the wolf chases him through the house, with Bugs playing "stool-pigeon" and making him look in ridiculous hiding places. The wolf, however, is constantly interrupted by Little Red Riding Hood, who continues trying to act out the original story, oblivious to the chase. The wolf finally flirts with her in a faux French accent before yelling at her to get out and giving her the "heave-ho", only to be given similar treatment by Bugs.

When cornered by the wolf, Bugs irritates him by mimicking his speech and gestures, finally tricking him into singing and dancing to "Put on Your Old Grey Bonnet" (prompting Bugs to hold up a sign saying "Silly, isn't he?"). After once again evading the wolf thanks to another Little Red Riding Hood interruption, Bugs sneaks up on him by hiding inside his nightdress and scorches his backside with a hot coal. As the wolf howls with pain and leaps into the air, Bugs dumps a shovelful of hot coals on the floor to burn him when he lands, but the wolf manages to avoid them by doing a split and bracing himself between a bench and a chair.

Bugs proceeds to dump various heavy objects into the wolf's arms, trying to weigh the wolf down and make him fall on the pile of coals. Just as Bugs is about to drop a single piece of straw on top of the tower of heavy objects, Little Red Riding Hood once again loudly barges into the room. Finally sick of Little Red Riding Hood's interruptions (and despite realizing that he'll "probably hate [himself] in the morning"), Bugs frees the wolf and puts her in his place. The short ends with Little Red Riding Hood desperately trying to hold her backside over the pile of hot coals while weighed down with the pile of heavy objects as Bugs and the wolf watch in amusement while sharing a carrot.

== Home media ==
This cartoon is found on the 1989 MGM Home Video release Bugs & Daffy: The Wartime Cartoons, and on the Warner Home Video releases Looney Tunes Golden Collection: Volume 2 and Looney Tunes Platinum Collection: Volume 3.

== See also ==
- Bugs Bunny filmography
- Looney Tunes and Merrie Melodies filmography (1940–1949)

== Sources ==
- Beckett, Sandra (2008). "Epilogue". Red Riding Hood for All Ages: A Fairy-tale Icon in Cross-cultural Contexts. Wayne State University Press. ISBN 978-0814333068.
- Beckett, Sandra (2008). "Little Red Riding Hood". In Haase, Donald (ed.). The Greenwood Encyclopedia of Folktales and Fairy Tales: G-P. Greenwood Publishing Group. ISBN 978-0313334436.
- Sandler, Kevin S. (1998). "Introduction". Reading the Rabbit: Explorations in Warner Bros. Animation. Rutgers University Press. ISBN 978-0813525389.
- Zipes, Jack (2011). "Animated Fairy-Tale Cartoons:Celebrating the Carnival Art of the Ridiculous". The Enchanted Screen: The Unknown History of Fairy-Tale Films. Routledge. ISBN 978-1135853952.
- Zipes, Jack (2011). "The Trials and Tribulations of Little Red Riding Hood Revisited and Reviewed". The Enchanted Screen: The Unknown History of Fairy-Tale Films. Routledge. ISBN 978-1135853952.

Preceded by Falling Hare	Bugs Bunny Cartoons; 1944	Succeeded by What's Cookin' Doc?
