= Gremlin =

Fictional mischievous creature

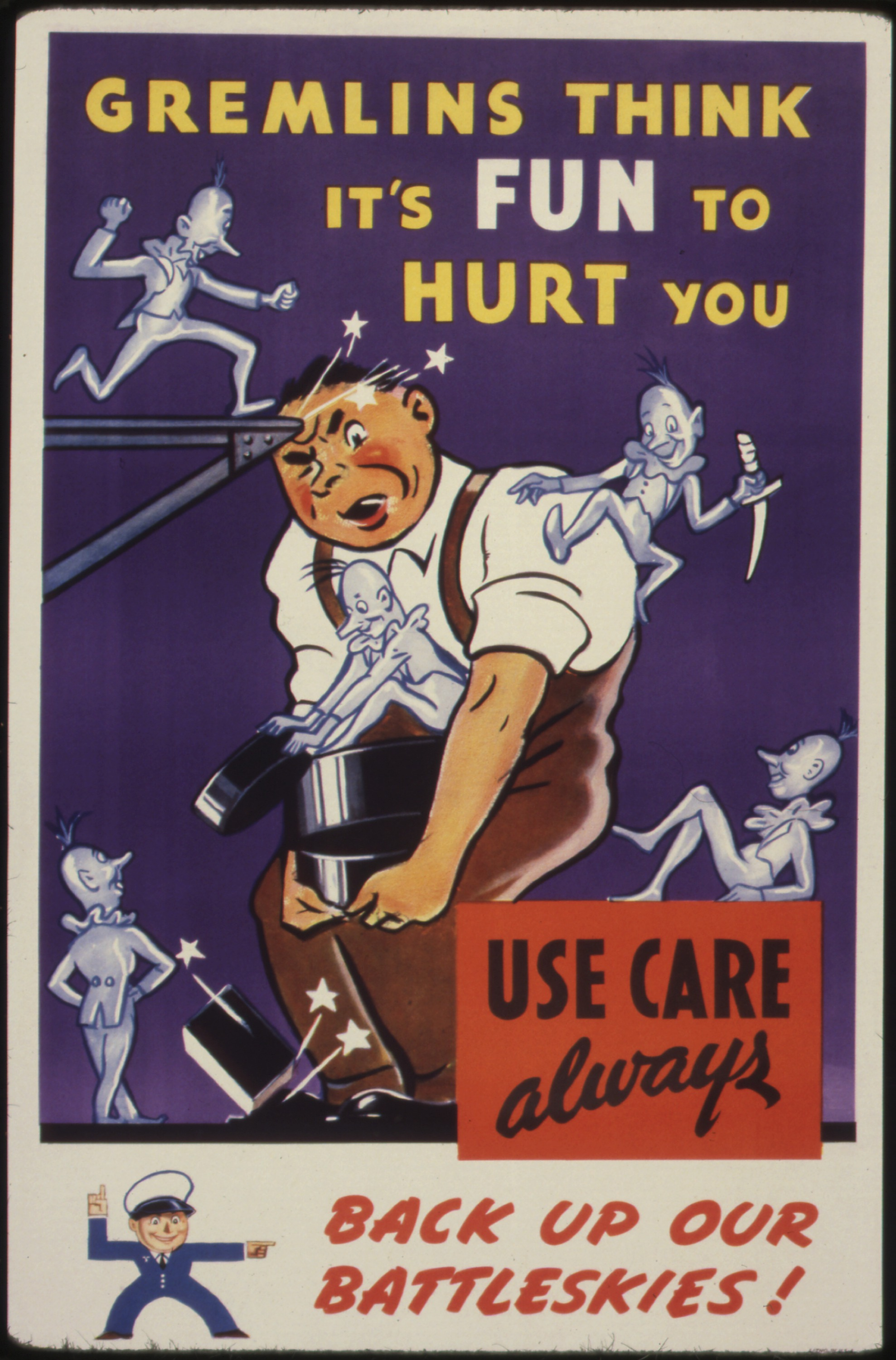
A World War II gremlin-themed industrial safety poster

A gremlin is a mischievous fictional creature invented at the beginning of the 20th century originally to explain malfunctions in aircraft, and later in other machinery, processes and their operators. Depictions of these creatures vary widely. Stories about them and references to them as the causes of especially inexplicable technical and mental problems of pilots were especially popular during and after World War II.

Use of the term in the sense of a mischievous creature that sabotages aircraft first arose in Royal Air Force (RAF) slang among British pilots stationed in Malta, the Middle East and India in the 1920s, with the earliest printed record in a poem published in the journal Aeroplane in Malta on 10 April 1929. Later sources have sometimes claimed that the concept goes back to World War I, but there is no print evidence of this. (Note: Hazen also claims: "It was not until 1922 that anyone dared mention their name.")

There is evidence of an even earlier reference in the 1920s, stating that the term was used in the RAF to refer to a lowly menial person, such as a low-ranking officer or enlisted man saddled with oppressive assignments.

== Aviation origins ==
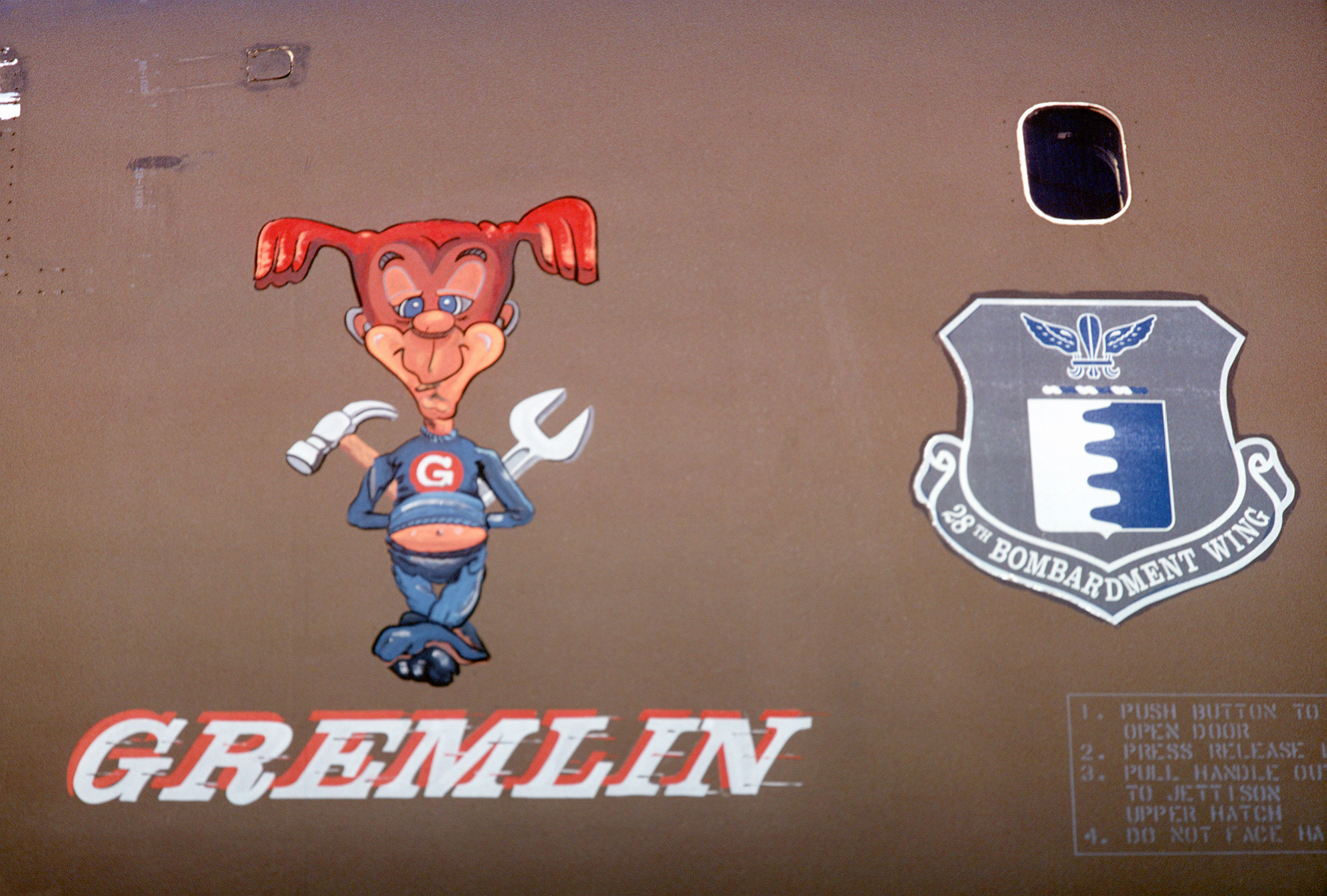
Gremlin depicted in nose art of a Rockwell B-1 Lancer aircraft of the 28th Bomb Wing.

Although their origin is found in myths among airmen claiming that gremlins were responsible for sabotaging aircraft, the folklorist John W. Hazen states that some people derive the name from the Old English word gremian, "to vex", while Carol Rose, in her book Spirits, Fairies, Leprechauns, and Goblins: An Encyclopedia, attributes the name to a portmanteau of Grimm's Fairy Tales and Fremlin Beer. According to Paul Quinion, it is plausible that the term is a blend of the word "goblin" with the name of the manufacturer of the most common beer available in the RAF in the 1920s, Fremlin.

An early reference to the gremlin is in aviator Pauline Gower's 1938 novel The ATA: Women with Wings, where Scotland is described as "gremlin country", a mystical and rugged territory where scissor-wielding gremlins cut the wires of biplanes when unsuspecting pilots were about. An article by Hubert Griffith in the servicemen's fortnightly Royal Air Force Journal dated 18 April 1942, also chronicles the appearance of gremlins, although the article states the stories had been in existence for several years, with later recollections of it having been told by Battle of Britain Spitfire pilots as early as 1940.

This concept of gremlins was popularized during World War II among airmen of the Royal Air Force (RAF) units, in particular the men of the high-altitude Photographic Reconnaissance Units (PRU) of RAF Benson, RAF Wick and RAF St Eval. The flight crews blamed gremlins for otherwise inexplicable accidents which sometimes occurred during their flights. Gremlins were also thought at one point to have enemy sympathies, but investigations revealed that enemy aircraft had similar and equally inexplicable mechanical problems. As such, gremlins were portrayed as equal opportunity tricksters, taking no sides in the conflict, but acting out their mischief from their own self-interest. In reality, the gremlins were a form of "buck passing" or deflecting blame. This led John Hazen to note that "the gremlin has been looked on as [a] new phenomenon, a product of the machine age – the age of air". The concept of gremlins as a scapegoat was important to the morale of pilots according to the author and historian Marlin Bressi:

"Gremlins, while imaginary, played a very important role to the airmen of the Royal Air Force. Gremlin tales helped build morale among pilots, which, in turn, helped them repel the Luftwaffe invasion during the Battle of Britain during the summer of 1940. The war may have had a very different outcome if the R.A.F. pilots had lost their morale and allowed Germany's plans for Operation Sea Lion (the planned invasion of the U.K.) to develop. In a way, it could be argued that gremlins, troublesome as they were, ultimately helped the Allies win the war." Bressi also noted: "Morale among the R.A.F. pilots would have suffered if they pointed the finger of blame at each other. It was far better to make the scapegoat a fantastic and comical creature than another member of your own squadron."

Examples of Gremlins can be seen in the IBCC Digital Archive.

World War II posters warning of gremlins

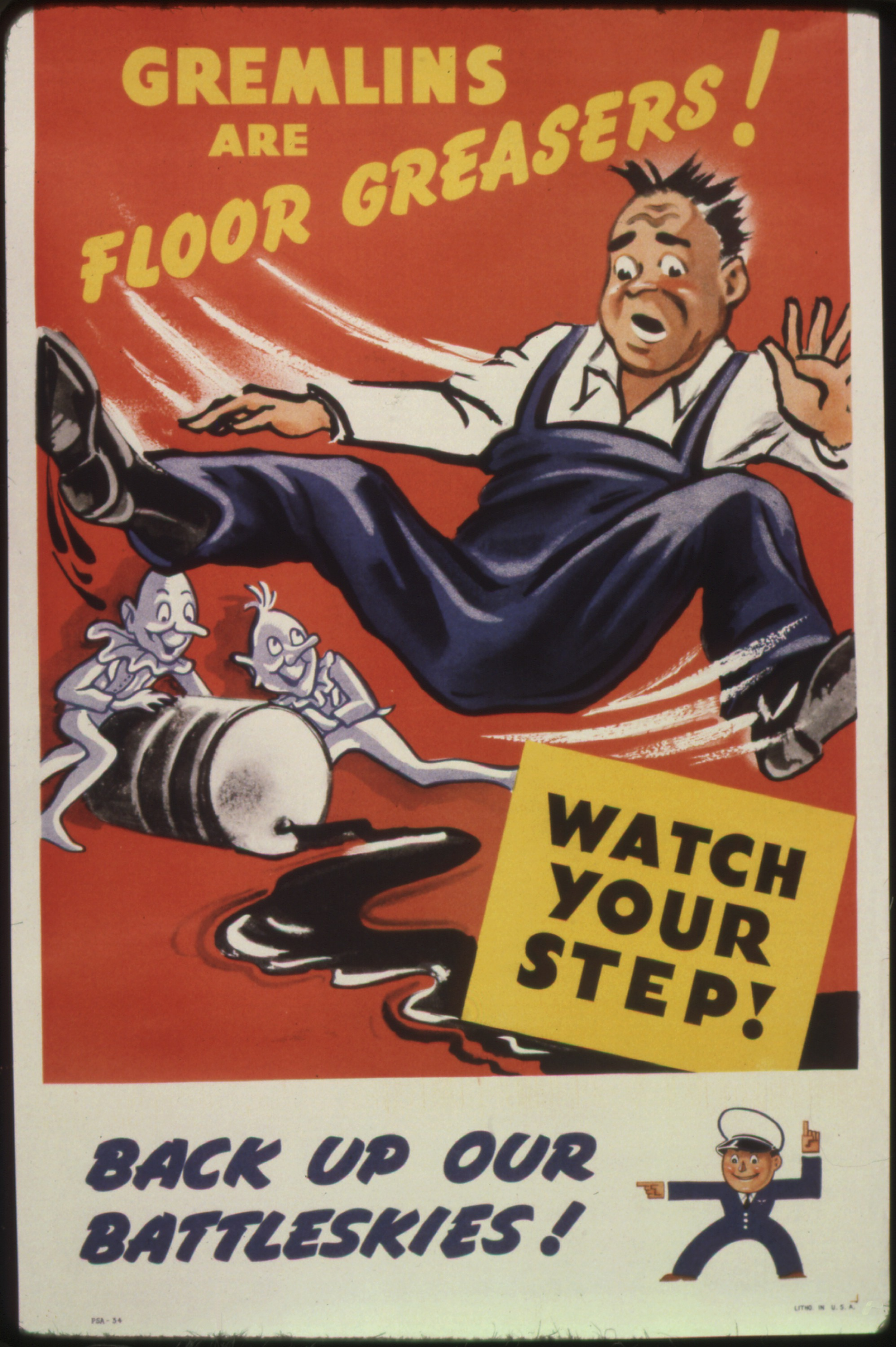

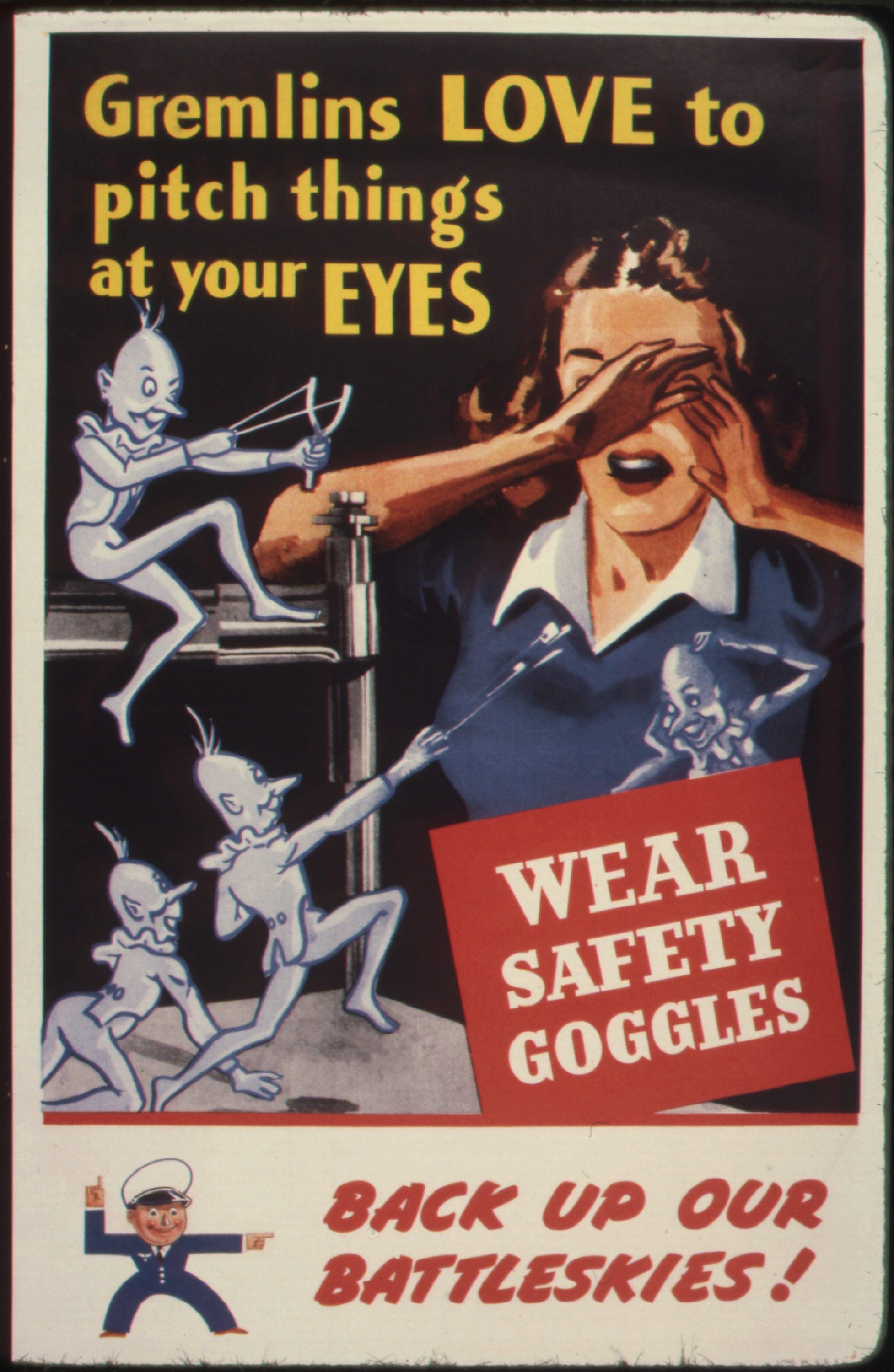

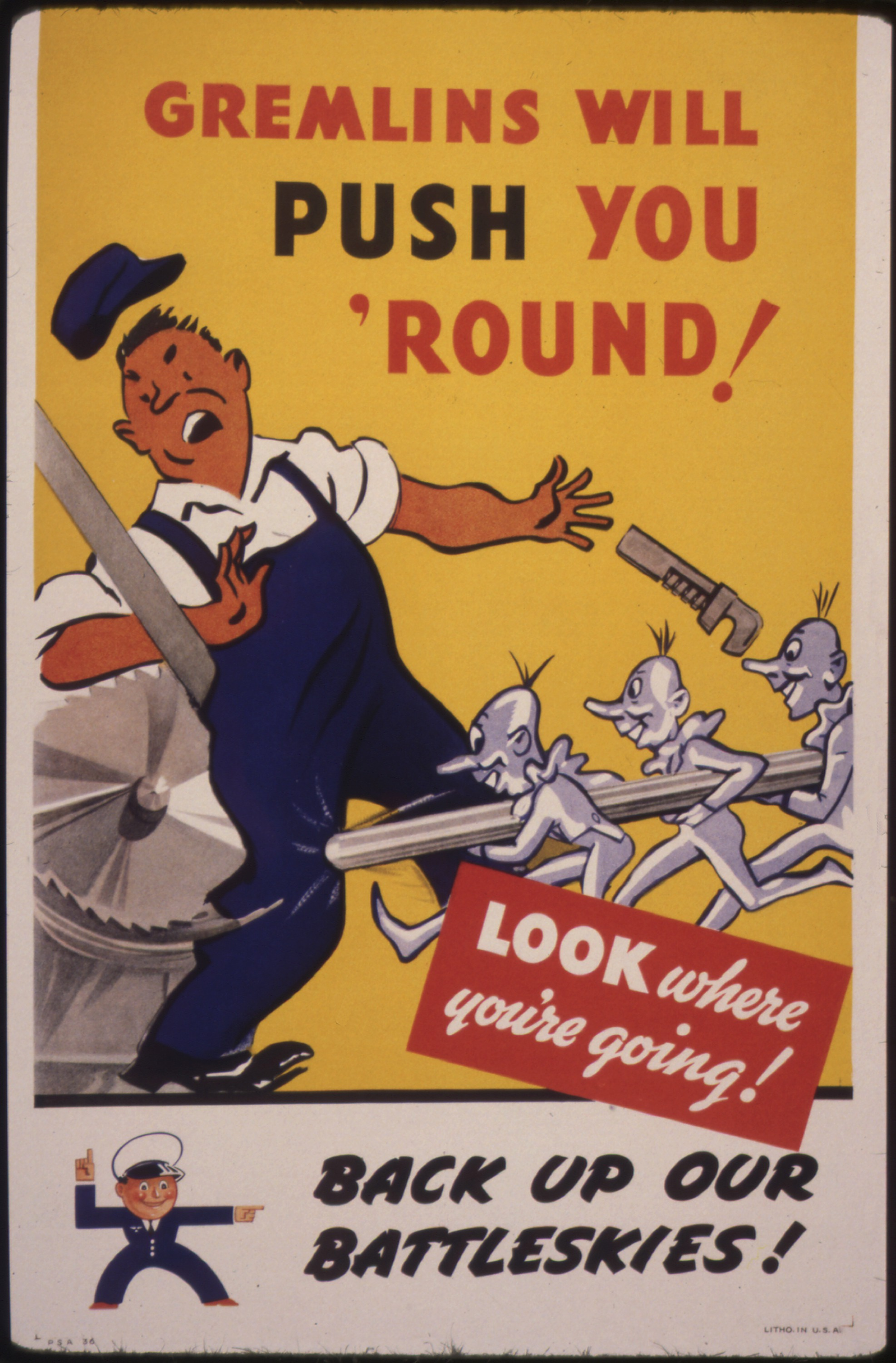

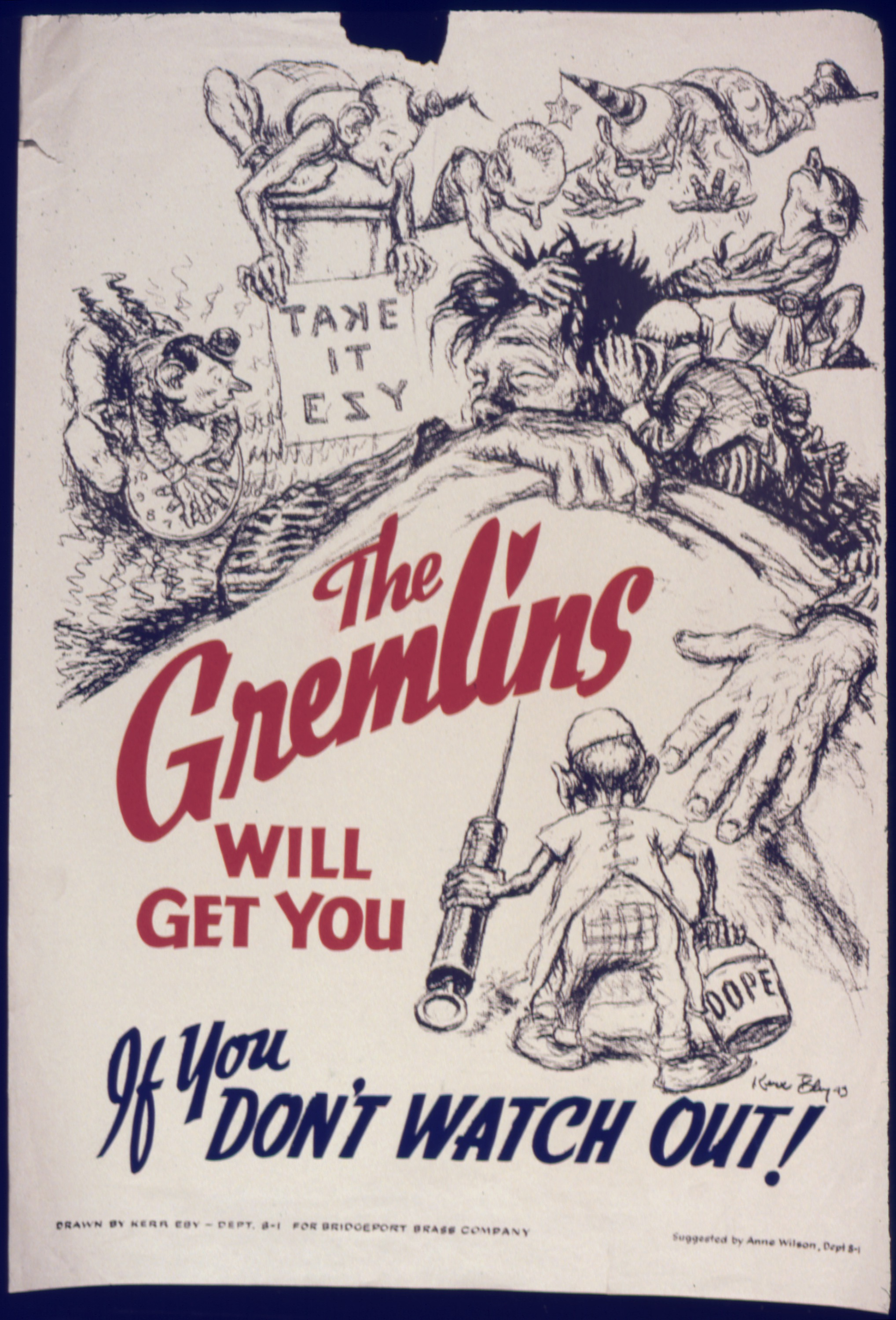

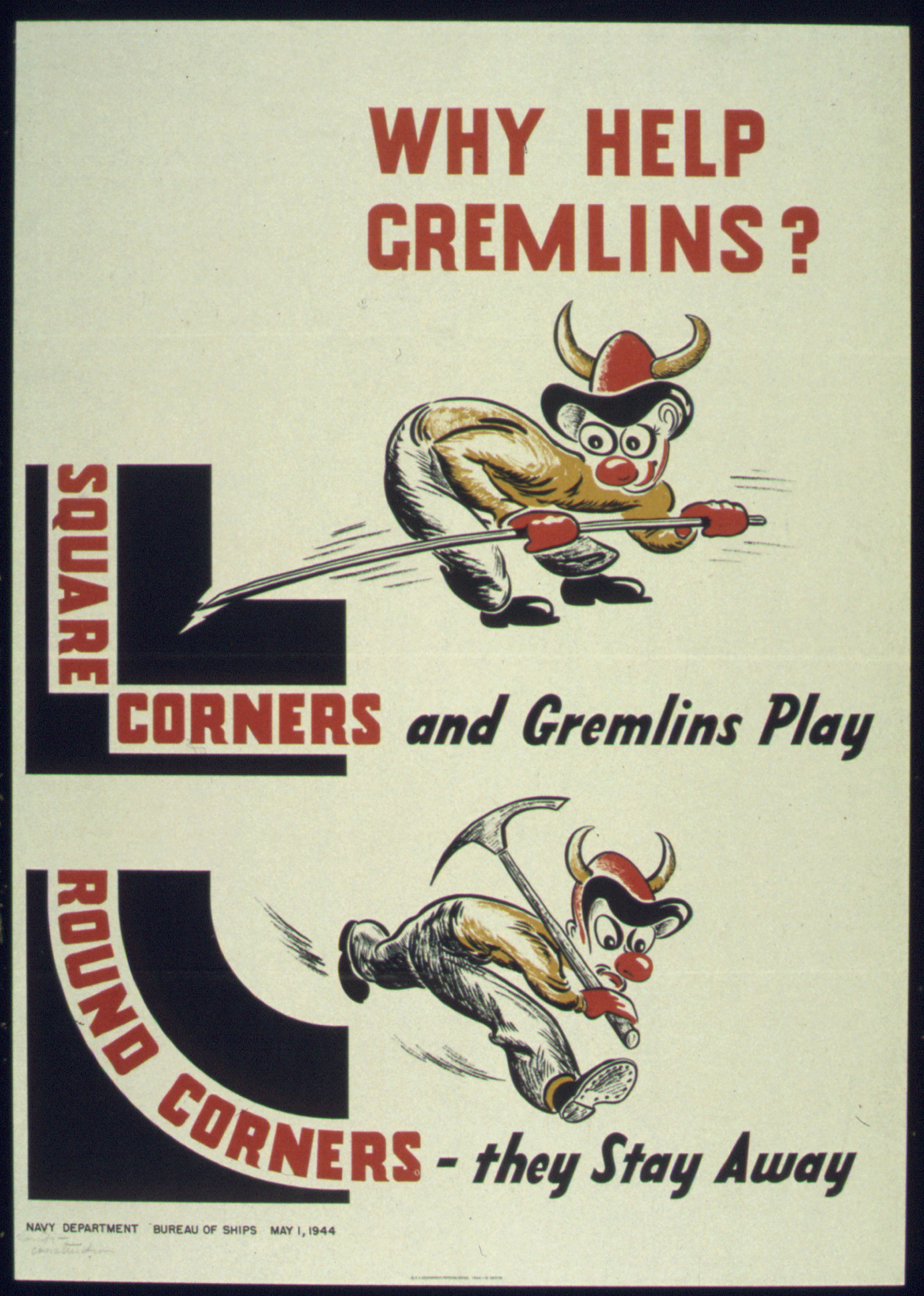

== Popularization by Roald Dahl ==
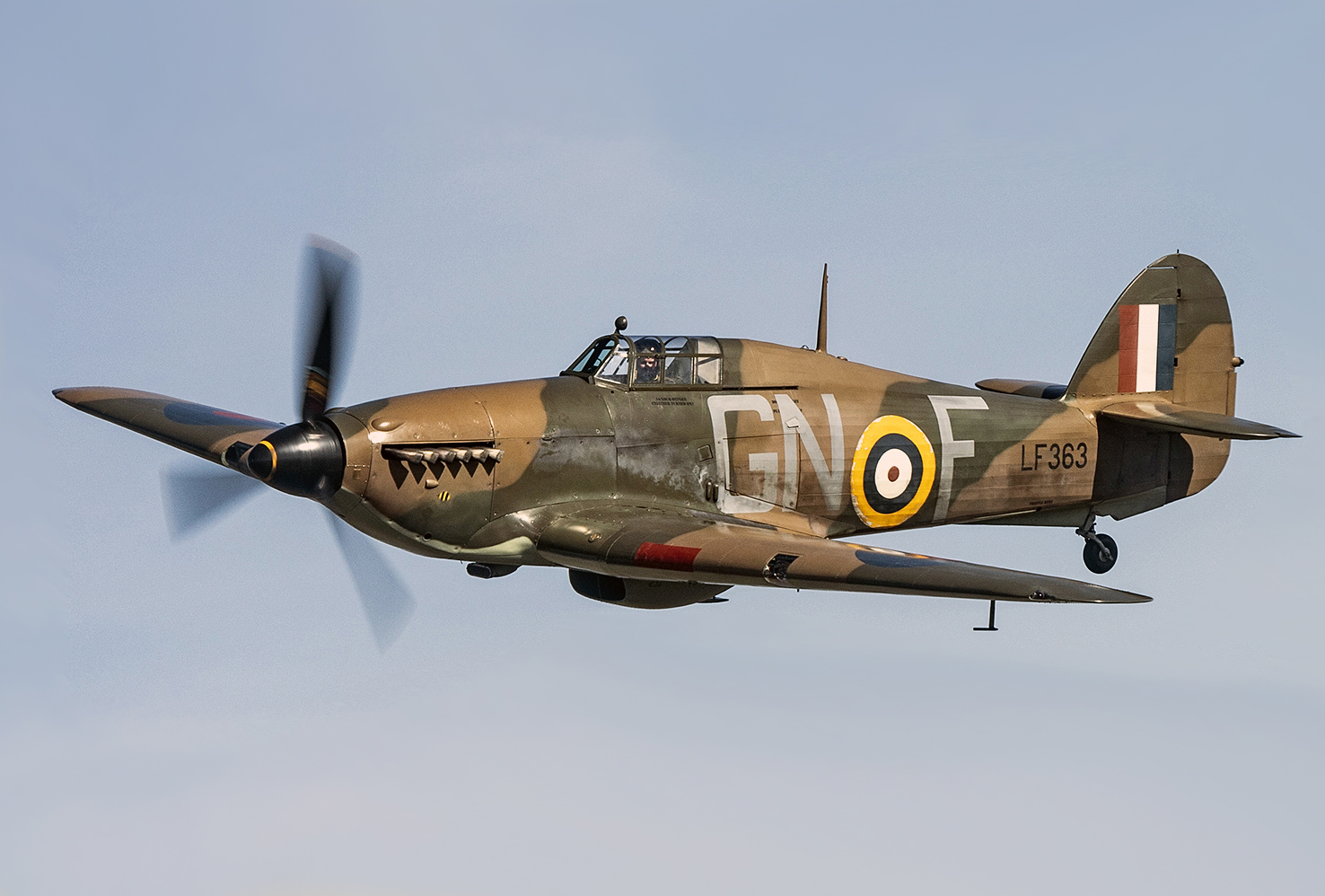
Royal Air Force pilot and author Roald Dahl flew a Hawker Hurricane during WWII which he incorporated into his 1943 children's novel The Gremlins

British author Roald Dahl is credited with getting the gremlins known outside the Royal Air Force. He would have been familiar with the myth, having carried out his military service in 80 Squadron of the Royal Air Force in the Middle East. Dahl had his own experience in an accidental crash-landing in the Western Desert when he ran out of fuel. In January 1942, he was transferred to Washington, D.C. as Assistant Air attaché at the British Embassy. It was there that he wrote his first children's novel, The Gremlins, in which "Gremlins" were tiny men who lived on RAF fighters. In the same novel, Dahl called the wives of gremlins "Fifinellas", their male children "Widgets", and their female children "Flibbertigibbets". Dahl showed the finished manuscript to Sidney Bernstein, the head of the British Information Service, who came up with the idea to send it to Walt Disney. (Note: Dahl claimed that the gremlins were exclusively a Royal Air Force icon and he originated the term, but the elf-like figures had a very convoluted origin that predated his original writings.)

The manuscript arrived in Disney's hands in July 1942, and he considered using it as material for a live action/animated full-length feature film, offering Dahl a contract. (Note: Dahl was given permission by the British Air Ministry to work in Hollywood and an arrangement had been made that all proceeds from the eventual film would be split between the RAF Benevolent Fund and Dahl.) The film project was changed to an animated feature and entered pre-production, with characters "roughed out" and storyboards created. Disney managed to have the story published in the December 1942 issue of Cosmopolitan magazine. At Dahl's urging, in early 1943, a revised version of the story, again titled The Gremlins, was published as a picture book by Random House. (It was later updated and re-published in 2006 by Dark Horse Comics). (Note: The book had an autobiographical connection as Dahl had flown as a Hurricane fighter pilot in the RAF, and was temporarily on leave from operational flying after serious injuries sustained in a crash landing in Libya. He later returned to flying.)

The 1943 publication of The Gremlins by Random House consisted of 50,000 copies, with Dahl ordering 50 copies for himself as promotional material for himself and the upcoming film, handing them out to everyone he knew, including the British ambassador in Washington Lord Halifax, and the US First Lady Eleanor Roosevelt who read it to her grandchildren. The book was considered an international success with 30,000 more sold in Australia but initial efforts to reprint the book were precluded by a wartime paper shortage. Reviewed in major publications, Dahl was considered a writer-of-note and his appearances in Hollywood to follow up with the film project were met with notices in Hedda Hopper's columns. (Note: In 1950, Collins Publishing (New York) published a limited reprint of The Gremlins.)

The film project was reduced to an animated short and eventually cancelled in August 1943, when copyright and RAF rights could not be resolved. But thanks mainly to Disney, the story had its share of publicity, which helped in introducing the concept to a wider audience. Issues #33–41 of Walt Disney's Comics and Stories published between June 1943 and February 1944 contained a nine-episode series of short silent stories featuring a Gremlin Gus as their star. The first was drawn by Vivie Risto, and the rest of them by Walt Kelly. This served as their introduction to the comic book audience as they are human gremlins who lived in their own village as little flying human people.

While Roald Dahl was famous for making gremlins known worldwide, many returning Air Servicemen swear they saw creatures tinkering with their equipment. One crewman swore he saw one before an engine malfunction that caused his North American B-25 Mitchell bomber to rapidly lose altitude, forcing the aircraft to return to base. Folklorist Hazen likewise offers his own alleged eyewitness testimony of these creatures, which appeared in an academically praised and peer-reviewed publication, describing an occasion he found "a parted cable which bore obvious tooth marks in spite of the fact that the break occurred in a most inaccessible part of the plane". At this point, Hazen states he heard "a gruff voice" demand, "How many times must you be told to obey orders and not tackle jobs you aren't qualified for? – This is how it should be done." Upon which Hazen heard a "musical twang" and another cable was parted.

Critics of this idea state that the stress of combat and the dizzying heights caused such hallucinations, often believed to be a coping mechanism of the mind to help explain the many problems aircraft faced while in combat.

Differences between Dahl versions
| | In The Gremlins | In Sometime Never |
|---|---|---|
| Habitat | Formerly in the prima forest and swamps of England, later in hangars (the Spandules, a different breed of Gremlins, live in clouds) | In one forest in England before the Industrial Revolution then moved underground |
| Food source | Used postage stamps | Snozzberries |
| Social Structure | Uncertain; rivalry between gremlins of different habitats; no established families | Ruled by one Leader, human-like society |
| Intelligence | Comparable to children, no clear culture of their own | Fully comparable to human; read human books |

== In media ==
=== Film ===
- In 1943, Bob Clampett directed Falling Hare, a Merrie Melodies cartoon featuring Bugs Bunny. Inspired by Roald Dahl's book and Walt Disney's proposed film, this short is one of the earliest films to include multiple gremlins, though only one was consequential. It features Bugs Bunny in conflict with a gremlin, first at an airfield and then in an airborne plane. It was followed in 1944 by Russian Rhapsody, another Merrie Melodies short showing Russian gremlins (modeled on Warner Brothers animation staff) sabotaging an aircraft piloted by Adolf Hitler. The gremlin in "Falling Hare" has a color scheme reflecting one used on U.S. Army Air Forces training aircraft of the time, using dark blue (as on such an aircraft's fuselage) and a deep orange-yellow color (as used on the wings and tail surfaces).
- The 1944 romantic comedy Johnny Doesn't Live Here Anymore features animated gremlins, who are voiced by an uncredited Mel Blanc.
- The 1981 animated film Heavy Metal contains a segment titled "B-17" had creatures referred to as "Gremlins" in which the sole surviving pilot of a battle weary aircraft is ravaged by the reanimated corpses of his fellow crew.
- The 1984 film Gremlins, produced by Steven Spielberg and directed by Joe Dante, is loosely inspired by Roald Dahl's characters, featuring evil and destructive monsters which mutate from small furry creatures. Murray Futterman, a WWII veteran, calls the creatures "Real Gremlins". A sequel followed in 1990, called Gremlins 2: The New Batch.
- In Cast a Deadly Spell, a 1991 HBO television film, gremlins are said to have been "brought back from the pacific" to the United States in World War II and are seen damaging cars and houses.
- In Madagascar: Escape 2 Africa (2008), Alex sees Mort (mistaking him for a gremlin) messing with the engine and falling off the aircraft.
- In the Hotel Transylvania franchise, the gremlins are seen as guests of the monster hotel built by Count Dracula. The third film, Summer Vacation, establishes that the gremlins run their own airline.
- A batlike gremlin appears in the 2020 film Shadow in the Cloud. The film starts with a depiction of gremlins in WWII circa posters as a creative scapegoat used by airmen to deflect negligence in maintenance and responsibility for their aircraft. Once the protagonist boards the aircraft, she finds an actual gremlin is sabotaging the aircraft. The creature looks like a cross between a large bat with razor-sharp claws and a monkey with a long tail. The gremlin sabotages the aircraft by taking out an engine, attacking the protagonist in the lower turret and another crew member in the upper turret.

=== Television ===
William Shatner and the Gremlin (far shot, not in full costume) in The Twilight Zone episode "Nightmare at 20,000 Feet" (1963)

- The Twilight Zone episode "Nightmare at 20,000 Feet" (1963), directed by Richard Donner and based on the short story of the same name by Richard Matheson, features a gremlin attacking an airliner. In the original television episode, the gremlin appears as a stocky ape-like creature who damages the airplane's wing while curiously inspecting it. The gremlin is fended off by Robert Wilson (portrayed by William Shatner), a passenger who witnessed it earlier. This episode was remade as a segment of Twilight Zone: The Movie (1983), with John Lithgow playing a similar character named John Valentine. In this version of events, the gremlin intentionally damages the plane's wing.
- The 1975 Doctor Who serial "The Ark in Space" is set on a supposedly impervious, yet now decrepit space station. In it, the Doctor's companion Harry Sullivan explains the station's fate, saying, "Gremlins can get into everything, old girl. First law of the sea."
- A gremlin appears in The Simpsons episode "Treehouse of Horror IV" (1993) as part of the segment "Terror at 5½ Feet", which parodies The Twilight Zone's "Nightmare at 20,000 Feet". In the segment, a gremlin attempts to destroy the wheel of Bart Simpson's school bus. After fending off the gremlin with a flare gun, Bart is taken away in a straitjacket and later sees the gremlin outside of the ambulance.
- The Eek! The Cat episode "The Eex Files" (1994) starts out with Eek on an aircraft beside a man claiming to see someone outside on the wing. When he looks, there is no one there. At the end of the episode, Eek is dropped off by an alien on the wing of the aircraft and meets the gremlin, then promptly offers to help him "find his wallet". The final scene shows the half-crazed man looking out the window and "spazzing out" when he sees them both tearing up the wing.
- The Tiny Toon Adventures special "Night Ghoulery" (1995) includes a spoof of Night Gallery, with Babs Bunny presenting in Rod Serling's style. The episode also has a segment named "Gremlin on a Wing" which parodies "Nightmare at 20,000 Feet", with Plucky Duck in the place of Robert Wilson.
- At the end of episode 9 of Muppets Tonight, Miss Piggy sees a gremlin outside of her airplane window. William Shatner is seen sitting next to her as he claims that he has been complaining about the gremlin for years, but nobody does anything about it.
- The Real Ghostbusters episode "Don't Forget the Motor City" (1987) has the Ghostbusters traveling to Detroit to battle gremlins who are sabotaging a factory run by a fictional analog of General Motors.
- A gremlin appears in the Are You Afraid of the Dark? episode "The Tale of the Curious Camera" (1994). After getting his portraits back from the basketball team, Matt finds that he did not show up in the photos. To make it up to him, the photographer gives him an antique camera because it has apparently chosen him. Matt soon learns that anything or anyone he takes a picture of will have something bad happen to it whether he wants it or not. It is later revealed that a gremlin is inhabiting the camera.
- In the Thomas & Friends episode "Gordon and the Gremlin" (1998), gremlins are blamed for Gordon's fire not lighting and problems with the turntable. This episode references Gremlins (1984).
- In the Extreme Ghostbusters episode "Grease" (1997), the Ghostbusters have to capture a gremlin that was damaging New York's machines, while at the same time the FBI believes them to be the cause of the sabotage.
- In So Weird (1999), the gang stop at a town called "Simplicity" where gremlins are destroying everything mechanical. In the fiction of the episode, gremlins were the original inventors and were upset with humans for taking their technology for granted. The gremlins are only appeased by the gang re-writing a locally based tech conglomerate's jingle to be about simple living.
- The American Dragon: Jake Long episode "Jake Takes the Cake" (2005) features gremlins who mess with any type of mechanical devices and cause a lot of trouble until they are put to sleep and captured.
- The 2013 entry for the Kamen Rider series titled Kamen Rider Wizard features a Phantom known as Gremlin. His human name Sora is Japanese for "sky", possibly an allusion to planes. He wields a pair of swords modeled after scissor blades, reflecting the claims that gremlins use scissors to cut wires in biplanes.
- The Ben 10 alien Juryrigg is modeled after a gremlin. He is highly skilled with machines, allowing him to rapidly disassemble and reassemble machines into new forms.
- The 2010 Super Sentai series, Tensou Sentai Goseiger featured the antagonistic cryptid-themed monster group Yuumajuu. One of their members is the bratty Waraikozou of the Gremlin, who has the secondary theme of flea. Like stereotypical gremlins, Waraikozou is capable of destroying mechanical objects.
- Mr. Bogus are a gremlin like and based on the French / Belgian clay animation series of shorts simply titled, Bogus.
- An animated television series based on the 1984 film Gremlins was released for HBO Max, entitled Gremlins: Secrets of the Mogwai. It was released in 2023 following delays. It serves as a prequel to the original films, expanding on the lore of the small furry creatures known as Mogwai, who reproduce when wet and become evil Gremlins when fed after midnight, as well as how the Wing family, namely 10 year old Sam, came into possession of Gizmo.

=== Radio ===
- On 21 December 1942, CBS aired "Gremlins", a whimsical story written by Lucille Fletcher, on an episode of Orson Welles's patriotic radio series Ceiling Unlimited. U.S. Army Air Forces officers discuss their experiences with the irritating creatures, and conclude that feeding them transforms them into an asset rather than a hindrance to aviation.
- On 3 Dec 2021, Tasgeel Podcast produced a Gremlin influenced short audio film "The Trip".

=== Music ===
- On Robert Calvert's 1974 concept album Captain Lockheed and the Starfighters, the Song of the Gremlin and the Song of the Gremlin Part 2, describing how gremlins sabotage all man's attempts to fly.
- Used in Kodak Black's 2022 song "Super Gremlin".

=== Literature ===
- The 1947 novel by Roald Dahl, Sometime Never: A Fable for Supermen, had the Gremlin leader as the protagonist of the second half of the book. He is described as leading an ancient nature-loving race away from the wars between humans and trying to let his race survive the destruction of humanity.
- The first issue of the Monster in My Pocket comic book series has Gremlin prominently among the good monsters. He is able to create fire from his fingertips. In the second through fourth issues, this power is given to Hobgoblin, and Gremlin is never seen again.
- In the micro-series of the My Little Pony: Friendship Is Magic comic book series, there is a species called Cloud Gremlins, which cast a spell in Ponyville. In the end, they are defeated by Rainbow Dash.
- In The Paladin Prophecy, the main character is attacked while on a plane, by creatures he calls "gremlins"
- Gremlin Americanus: A Scrap Book Collection of Gremlins by artist and pilot Eric Sloane may predate the Roald Dahl publication. Published in 1942 by B.F. Jay & Co, the central characters are characterized as "pixies of the air" and are friends of both RAF and USAAF pilots. The gremlins are mischievous and give pilots a great deal of trouble, but they have never been known to cause fatal accidents but can be blamed for any untoward incident or "bonehead play", qualities that endear them to all flyers. (Note: On the front pastedown endpaper, Sloane's book featured a sketch of an aircraft in flight, with the pilot saying, "The Gremlins will get you if you don't watch out!!" and giving a thumbs up.)
- Ssh! Gremlins by H.W., illustrated by Ronald Neighbour ("Neb" of the Daily Mail), published in 1942 by H. W. John Crowther Publication, England, features numerous humorous illustrations describing the gremlins as whimsical but essentially friendly folk. According to "H.W.", contrary to some reports, gremlins are a universal phenomenon and by no means only the friends of flying men. (Note: The booklet was published posthumously as Wilson had died in 1940.)

=== Card games ===
- In the 2016 released set of Magic: The Gathering, Kaladesh, Gremlins (portrayed as four-armed, human-sized mammals with anteater-like snouts) appear on the technologically progressive plane and destroy the artifacts and inventions of many people on the plane, and are considered a public safety hazard. This was the first gremlin card in Magic since Gremlin Mine printed in the 2011 set New Phyrexia. Prior to that, the earliest gremlin card was Phyrexian Gremlins printed in the 1994 Antiquities set.
- In the Yu-Gi-Oh! Trading Card Game, the cards "Feral Imp", "Des Feral Imp", and "King of the Feral Imps" are based on gremlins.

=== Video games ===
- In 1984, the video game Gremlins was released as a tie-in to the film of the same name.
- In 1990, Gremlins 2: The New Batch was released, also a tie-in to the film of the same name.
- In 1992, an enemy named Gremlin appears in Monster in My Pocket as the boss of stage four.
- In the Epic Mickey games (2010, 2012), Gremlins assist Mickey Mouse after he releases them.
- In Spiral Knights (2011), Gremlins serve as an enemy faction and multiple different enemies.
- In Skylanders, gremlins appear in game. However, they are shown as rabbit-like creatures than humanoid. Pop Fizz (voiced by Bobcat Goldthwait) and Trigger Happy (voiced by Dave Wittenberg) are gremlins who are known Skylanders.
- In the 2016 video game XCOM 2, the Specialist soldier class utilises drones called GREMLINs for a range of actions in combat.
- In Pokémon Sword and Shield, Impidimp and its evolutions are Dark/Fairy type Pokémon based on the gremlin.
- In Dwarf Fortress, the gremlins are small intelligent underground creatures that can cause great disorder by playing with levers.
- In Heroes of Might and Magic 3, gremlins are first-level recruitable creatures from the town, Tower.
- In Slay the Spire, gremlins are a recurring enemy throughout the game.

== See also ==
- AMC Gremlin Automobile
- Demon
- Fairy
- Fearsome critters, folkloric creatures that arose contemporaneously with that of the gremlin
- Femlins, female gremlins featured in Playboy magazine
- Fifinella a Disney characterization
- Froggy the Gremlin, a character on an American TV show in the 1950s
- Goblin
- Gremlin Graphics, the now-defunct video games studio
- Imp
- Jinn
- Klabautermann
- Kobold
- Machine Elf
- Titivillus bedeviled medieval scribes
