= Canyon (horse) =

British-bred Thoroughbred racehorse

- Sire: Chaucer
- Grandsire: St Simon
- Dam: Glasalt
- Damsire: Isinglass
- Sex: Mare
- Foaled: 18 March 1913
- Country: United Kingdom
- Colour: Bay
- Breeder: 17th Earl of Derby
- Owner: 17th Earl of Derby
- Trainer: George Lambton
- Record: 9: 4-2-0

Major wins
- 1000 Guineas (1916)

Canyon (1913 – April 1939) was a British Thoroughbred racehorse and broodmare. As a two-year-old in 1915 she won three races including the Bedford Stakes and the Bretby Stakes as well as finishing second in the Dewhurst Stakes. In the following spring she recorded her biggest win when defeating Fifinella in the 1000 Guineas. Canyon failed to win again but after her retirement from racing she became a very successful broodmare, whose offspring included Colorado and two other major winners.

== Background ==
Canyon was a bay mare bred and owned by Edward Stanley, 17th Earl of Derby. She was trained throughout his career by Lord Derby's private trainer George Lambton at the Stanley House stable at Newmarket, Suffolk. She stood 15 2½ hands high and in appearance was described as showing "superb quality", "great length" and "immense power".

Her sire Chaucer won the Gimcrack Stakes as a juvenile in 1902, and later proved himself a high-class performer in handicap races. As a breeding stallion he sired the 1000 Guineas winner Pillion and was the damsire of Fairway, Hyperion, Pharos and Sickle. Canyon's dam Glatisant was an influential broodmare whose other descendants included Toboggan, Citation and Gate Dancer.

Canyon's racing career took place during World War I. Many racecourses were closed for the duration of the conflict and all five of traditional British Classic Races were run at Newmarket.

== Racing career ==
=== 1915: two-year-old season ===
Canyon recorded her first success in a maiden race maiden race and followed up by taking the Bedford Stakes at Newmarket Racecourse in May. She was beaten when attempting to concede 10 pounds to Melga in the Triennial Stakes at Ascot but then reversed the form by beating Melga at level weights in the Bretby Stakes. In the important Dewhurst Stakes over seven furlongs at Newmarket in October she finished second, beaten a head by the colt Atheling. She finished unplaced in her only other race that year.

=== 1916: three-year-old season ===
On her three-year-old debut Canyon started at odds of 9/2 for the 1000 Guineas over one mile at Newmarket on 5 May. Ridden by Fred Rickaby, she went to the front two furlongs out and held off a strong challenge from the odds-on favourite Fifinella to win by three quarters of a length. The pair finished three lengths clear of the other eight runners, which were headed by Salamandra.

Canyon was regarded as a serious contender for the "New Derby" at Newmarket on 29 May but reportedly "went amiss" shortly before the race. She took her place in the field but after contesting the lead for most of the way she faded in the closing stages and finished unplaced behind Fifinella. In September Canyon contested the September Stakes, a substitute for the Doncaster St Leger run over fourteen furlongs at Newmarket and finished last of the five runners behind Hurry On, Clarissimus, Atheling and Flaming Fire.

== Assessment and honours ==
In their book, A Century of Champions, based on the Timeform rating system, John Randall and Tony Morris rated Canyon an "inferior" winner of the 1000 Guineas.

== Breeding record ==
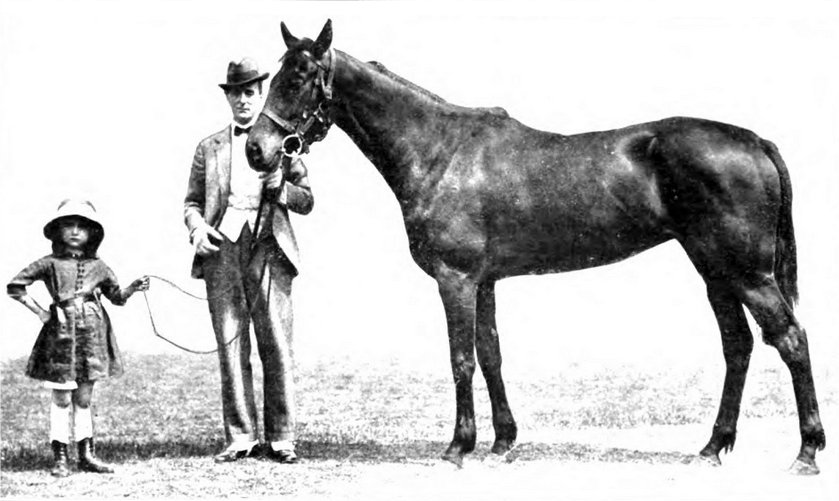
Canyon in retirement with her trainer George Lambton and his daughter Nancy, c. 1917.

Canyon was retired from racing to become a broodmare for Lord Derby's stud. She produced at least nine foals between 1920 and 1936:

- Sierra Leone, a brown colt (later gelded), foaled in 1920, sired by Great Sport. Runner-up in the Chester Cup.
- Halcyon, chestnut filly, 1921, by Phalaris. Won Richmond Stakes.
- Colorado, brown colt, 1923, by Phalaris. Won 2000 Guineas, Eclipse Stakes.
- Gonfalon, bay filly, 1926, by Gay Crusader
- Caerleon, brown colt, 1927, by Phalaris. Won Eclipse Stakes.
- Canaletto, chestnut colt, 1929, by Gainsborough
- Bright Angel, brown filly, 1930, by Phalaris
- Overthrow, bay colt, 1934, by Bosworth
- Cougar, bay colt, 1936, by Hill Cat

Canyon was destroyed in April 1939.

== Pedigree ==
Pedigree of Canyon (GB), bay mare, 1913
Sire Chaucer (GB) 1900	St Simon (GB); 1881	Galopin	Vedette
Sire Chaucer (GB) 1900	St Simon (GB); 1881	Galopin	Flying Duchess
Sire Chaucer (GB) 1900	St Simon (GB); 1881	St Angela	King Tom
Sire Chaucer (GB) 1900	St Simon (GB); 1881	St Angela	Adeline
Sire Chaucer (GB) 1900	Canterbury Pilgrim (GB); 1893	Tristan	Hermit
Sire Chaucer (GB) 1900	Canterbury Pilgrim (GB); 1893	Tristan	Thrift
Sire Chaucer (GB) 1900	Canterbury Pilgrim (GB); 1893	Pilgrimage	The Palmer
Sire Chaucer (GB) 1900	Canterbury Pilgrim (GB); 1893	Pilgrimage	Lady Audley
Dam Glasalt (GB) 1898	Isinglass (GB); 1890	Isonomy	Sterling
Dam Glasalt (GB) 1898	Isinglass (GB); 1890	Isonomy	Isola Bella
Dam Glasalt (GB) 1898	Isinglass (GB); 1890	Dead Lock	Wenlock
Dam Glasalt (GB) 1898	Isinglass (GB); 1890	Dead Lock	Malpractice
Dam Glasalt (GB) 1898	Broad Corrie (GB); 1889	Hampton	Lord Clifden
Dam Glasalt (GB) 1898	Broad Corrie (GB); 1889	Hampton	Lady Langden
Dam Glasalt (GB) 1898	Broad Corrie (GB); 1889	Corrie Roy	Galopin
Dam Glasalt (GB) 1898	Broad Corrie (GB); 1889	Corrie Roy	Corrie (Family 3-l)

- Canyon was inbred 3 × 4 to Galopin, meaning that this stallion appears in both the third and fourth generations of her pedigree.
