= Colorado (horse) =

British-bred Thoroughbred racehorse

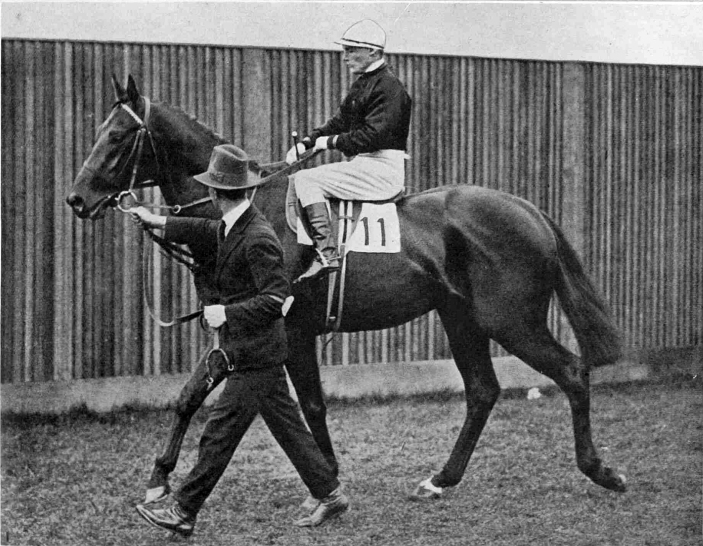
- Colorado after winning the 2000 Guineas in 1926.
- Sire: Phalaris
- Grandsire: Polymelus
- Dam: Canyon
- Damsire: Chaucer
- Sex: Stallion
- Foaled: 1923
- Country: Great Britain
- Colour: Dark Bay or Brown
- Breeder: Lord Derby
- Owner: Lord Derby
- Trainer: George Lambton
- Record: 16: 9-1-2
- Earnings: £30,358

Major wins
- Coventry Stakes (1925); 2000 Guineas (1926); Princess of Wales's Stakes (1927); Eclipse Stakes (1927)
- Last updated on January 10, 2008

Colorado (1923–1929) was a British Thoroughbred racehorse and sire. He won the 2000 Guineas in 1926 and the Eclipse Stakes in 1927. He was also noted for his rivalry with the Derby winner Coronach whom he defeated on three of their four meetings.

== Background ==
Until the emergence of Fairway at the end of the decade, Colorado was regarded as the best racehorse sired by Phalaris, who became the most influential stallion of the 20th Century. His dam, Canyon, won the 1000 Guineas in 1916 and was a successful broodmare. In addition to Colorado she produced the Eclipse Stakes winner Caerleon.

He was a small, but powerfully built colt standing just over 15 hands, known to be a particular favourite of his owner, Lord Derby. He was trained at Lord Derby's Stanley House stable by George Lambton who found him a difficult horse to prepare because of his habit of "choking" in exercise gallops.

== Racing career ==
=== 1925: two-year-old season ===
Colorado was a leading two-year-old in 1925, winning the Coventry Stakes at Royal Ascot. In the Free Handicap, an official assessment of the year's two-year-olds, Colorado was assesses on 118lbs, eight pounds below the joint topweights Coronach and Legatee.

=== 1926: three-year-old season ===
At three he won the Union Jack Stakes over a mile at Liverpool in March but worked poorly before the 2000 Guineas and started at 100/8 behind the strongly favoured Coronach. Colorado "dashed" into the lead in the final furlong and went clear to win by five lengths, giving Lord Derby his first win in the race.

He started favourite for the Derby but Coronach reversed the placings, winning by five lengths, with Colorado losing second place by a short head to Lancegaye. Weston, was certain that he would have at least been closer at Epsom if he had not been instructed to employ exaggerated waiting tactics. His cause was not helped when he had to swerve when a spectator's dog ran onto the course. In his next race Colorado started odds-on favourite for the Rous Memorial Stakes at Royal Ascot, but finished third of the four runners.

=== 1927: four-year-old season ===
After having taken a long time to recover his form after the Derby, Colorado returned to beat Coronach in their two meetings in 1927. He was unplaced on his debut, but won the one and a half mile Newbury Summer Cup in June.

In a much anticipated race for the Princess of Wales's Stakes Tommy Weston tracked Coronach in the early stages before moving Colorado up to challenge for the lead. After a brief "duel" Colorado pulled away to win by eight lengths. In the Eclipse Stakes he beat the three-year-old Mario by six lengths with Coronach a length further back in third. In the Champion Stakes at Newmarket in October he was narrowly beaten by the French-trained Asterus and was retired to stud as the winner of nine races, worth £30,358.

== Stud career ==
Colorado died on 16 September 1929, after only two seasons at stud, of gastroenteritis. He had made a promising start as a stallion, siring Felicitation who defeated Hyperion in the 1934 Ascot Gold Cup. He also got the Eclipse Stakes winner Loaningdale, Scarlet Tiger, who was third in the St. Leger, the top sprinter Coroado and the very versatile Colorado Kid.

== Pedigree ==
Pedigree of Colorado (GB), brown stallion, 1923
Sire Phalaris (GB) 1913	Polymelus (GB); 1902	Cyllene	Bona Vista
Sire Phalaris (GB) 1913	Polymelus (GB); 1902	Cyllene	Arcadia
Sire Phalaris (GB) 1913	Polymelus (GB); 1902	Maid Marian	Hampton
Sire Phalaris (GB) 1913	Polymelus (GB); 1902	Maid Marian	Quiver
Sire Phalaris (GB) 1913	Bromus (GB); 1905	Sainfoin	Springfield
Sire Phalaris (GB) 1913	Bromus (GB); 1905	Sainfoin	Sanda
Sire Phalaris (GB) 1913	Bromus (GB); 1905	Cheery	St. Simon
Sire Phalaris (GB) 1913	Bromus (GB); 1905	Cheery	Sunrise
Dam Canyon (GB) 1913	Chaucer (GB); 1900	St. Simon	Galopin
Dam Canyon (GB) 1913	Chaucer (GB); 1900	St. Simon	St. Angela
Dam Canyon (GB) 1913	Chaucer (GB); 1900	Canterbury Pilgrim	Tristan
Dam Canyon (GB) 1913	Chaucer (GB); 1900	Canterbury Pilgrim	Pilgrimage
Dam Canyon (GB) 1913	Glasalt (GB); 1898	Isinglass	Isonomy
Dam Canyon (GB) 1913	Glasalt (GB); 1898	Isinglass	Dead Lock
Dam Canyon (GB) 1913	Glasalt (GB); 1898	Broad Corrie	Hampton
Dam Canyon (GB) 1913	Glasalt (GB); 1898	Broad Corrie	Corrie Roy (Family 3-l)

- Colorado was inbred 3 × 4 to St Simon, meaning that this stallion appears in both the third and fourth generations of his pedigree.
