= Russian Rhapsody (film) =

1944 film by Bob Clampett

- Title card
- Directed by: Robert Clampett
- Story by: Lou Lilly
- Produced by: Leon Schlesinger
- Music by: Carl W. Stalling
- Animation by: Rod Scribner
- Backgrounds by: Michael Sasanoff
- Color process: Technicolor
- Production company: Leon Schlesinger Productions
- Distributed by: Warner Bros. Pictures
- Release date: May 20, 1944
- Running time: 7:01
- Language: English

Russian Rhapsody is a 1944 Warner Bros. Merrie Melodies cartoon directed by Bob Clampett. The short was released on May 20, 1944.

== Plot ==
In 1941, Nazi German bombers are failing to make it to Moscow in World War II; infuriated by his soldiers' constant failure, Führer Adolf Hitler announces his decision via a radio broadcast at a "New Odor" rally that he will personally fly a heavy bomber to attack the Russians and bomb Joseph Stalin and "that Irish general Tim O'Shenko." On the way to Moscow, Russian gremlins sneak onto the plane in flight and without Hitler's being aware of what is going on, begin to dismantle it while singing "We Are Gremlins from the Kremlin" to the tunes of "Ochi Chyornye" ("Dark Eyes") and "Eh, ukhnem" ("Song of the Volga Boatmen"), and the sabotage includes a "termiteski" busily devouring the plane's wing (with loud burps) and a microscopic gremlin smashing the control panel dials with an enormous wooden mallet and announcing "I'm only three and a half years old!"

Hitler eventually discovers the gremlins after he has been stabbed in the buttocks and tries to retaliate. He fails, being severely frightened by several gremlins holding a mask of Joseph Stalin. The gremlins succeed in ejecting him from the bomber by cutting a hole in the fuselage beneath him. As he falls, Hitler comes to and realizes the plane is right behind him in a power dive. He tries to outrun the plane and to hide behind a small sapling upon landing, but the plane alters course as seen by its shadow. Both Hitler and the plane are driven into the ground. The plane's tail with its swastika insignia erupts from the ground as a headstone.

The cartoon ends with the gremlins celebrating in victory as Hitler pops out of the ground, with his face grimacing into the one of comedian Lew Lehr, and paraphrasing his famous catchphrase: "Monkeys is the cwaziest [craziest] peoples!" (only changing the word "monkeys" into "Nutzies," referring to Nazis). A gremlin pounds Hitler back into the ground with a sledgehammer, ending the film under Clampett's signature "bee-woop" vocalization.

== Voice actors ==
Mel Blanc voiced the parts of the gremlins and Adolf Hitler. Robert C. Bruce is heard as the radio announcer. The Sherry Allen Group sang "We Are Gremlins from the Kremlin".

== Production ==
- Many of the gremlins are caricatures of the Warner Bros. animation department staff. The style is reminiscent of a 1936 Christmas card showcasing the staff as drawn by T. Hee. Among the recognizable gremlins are Leon Schlesinger (who is shown tapping the heads off of rivets with a hammer as he is being raised by a rope), Bob Clampett (shown nude with a pickaxe), Friz Freleng (the little green gremlin sawing), Chuck Jones (the fat blonde haired gremlin who nearly hits Freleng with a mallet), Michael Maltese, Bob Bentley, Rod Scribner, Melvin Millar, Mike Sasanoff, Johnny Burton, Lou Cavette, Henry Binder and Ray Katz. Freleng and Binder are also referenced during Hitler's fake German rant at the beginning of the cartoon. What's Cookin' Doc? (also directed by Bob Clampett) is referenced as well.
- The lyrics reference the 1942 Disney cartoon and the 1942 song (composed by Oliver Wallace and recorded by Spike Jones) both titled Der Fuhrer's Face.
- The gag showing a gremlin swapping windshield stickers is a reference to wartime U.S. gasoline rationing.
- Initially, this short was to be titled "Gremlins from the Kremlin", but Walt Disney was already in production of an adaptation of Roald Dahl's The Gremlins, which ended up never getting made.

== Reception ==
Animator Mark Kausler writes, "Russian Rhapsody is a funny musical cartoon about a man who was certainly the antithesis of comedy. The breadth and depth of Hitler's hatred of Jews and crimes against humanity were not fully known in 1944, when this cartoon was released. Director Bob Clampett, as usual, cast his animators well, giving Bob McKimson a showcase for his exceptional performing and drawing ability in the extended animated close-up of Hitler addressing the Nazi party faithful. McKimson makes Hitler a monster with huge shoulders and huge hands that reach out toward the camera in sweeping gestures. The range of emotions that Hitler goes through in his speech—from slobbering hatred as he rolls his r's, to teary resignation as he recalls the "Irish" General Tim O'Shenko (Russian Marshal Timoshenko), to his "Who else?" quip at the end, an impression of Yiddish comedian Artie Auerbach—are not just funny but also among the sharpest political observations created in the golden age of animation."

== Home media ==
- VHS, Laserdisc - Cartoon Moviestars: Bugs & Daffy: The Wartime Cartoons
- Laserdisc - The Golden Age of Looney Tunes, Vol. 3, Side 6: Tashlin/Clampett
- Laserdisc Canada Copy (1995 Dubbed Version) on Bugs Bunny and Friends
- DVD - Looney Tunes Golden Collection: Volume 6, Disc 2
- DVD - TCM Spotlight: Errol Flynn Adventures: Uncertain Glory (included as a bonus)
- Blu-Ray, DVD - Looney Tunes Platinum Collection: Volume 2, Disc 2

== Hitler's speech ==
In Hitler's opening speech, he says, "Stoupnegel hamburger mit der frankfurter und der sauerbraten! Mit der zoot suit, mit der reat pleat, zoot! Shtunk Friz Freleng, mit der Heinrich Binder, und der What's Cooking Doc! Pumpernickel mit sauerkrauten from der delicatessen, mit liverwurst, hasenpfeffer, und der Chattanooga Choo-Choo! Gesundheit! We will bomben der Moscow, bomben Stalin, bomben der Irish General Tim O'Shenko! *sobs* O'Shenko! To bomb Moscow, I will send the best pilot in the Reich! The greatest superman of all time!"

== See also ==
- List of World War II short films
