= The Gremlins =

1943 novel by Roald Dahl

- Cover of 2006 Dark Horse edition of The Gremlins
- Author: Roald Dahl
- Illustrator: Bill Justice; Al Dempster
- Language: English
- Published: 1943 Walt Disney Company (original); Dark Horse Comics (current)
- Publication place: United Kingdom
- Media type: Hardback
- ISBN: 1-59307-496-4

The Gremlins is a children's novel written by British author Roald Dahl and published in 1943. In writing the book, Dahl draws on his own experience as a Royal Air Force (RAF) pilot during the Second World War. The story's principal character Gus, an RAF pilot, has his Hawker Hurricane destroyed over the English Channel by a gremlin—mischievous creatures who were part of RAF folklore. As they parachute into the water, Gus convinces the gremlins to join forces against a common enemy: Hitler and the Nazis. It was Dahl's first book and was written for Walt Disney Productions, in anticipation of a feature-length animated film that was never made. (Note: Dahl claimed that the gremlins were exclusively a Royal Air Force icon and that he was the original author and creator, but the elf-like figures had a very convoluted origin that predated his original writings.)

With Dahl's assistance, a series of gremlin characters were developed, and while pre-production had begun, the film project was eventually abandoned, in part because the studio could not establish the precise rights of the "gremlin" story, and in part because the British Air Ministry was heavily involved in the production because Dahl, who was on leave from his wartime Washington posting, insisted on final approval of script and production. (Note: Dahl was given permission by the Air Ministry to work in Hollywood and an arrangement had been made that all proceeds from the film would be split between the RAF Benevolent Fund and Dahl.)

== Plot ==
The story concerns mischievous mythical creatures, the gremlins of the title, often invoked by Royal Air Force pilots as an explanation of mechanical troubles and mishaps. In Dahl's book, the gremlins' motivation for sabotaging British aircraft is revenge for the destruction of their forest home, which was razed to make way for an aircraft factory.

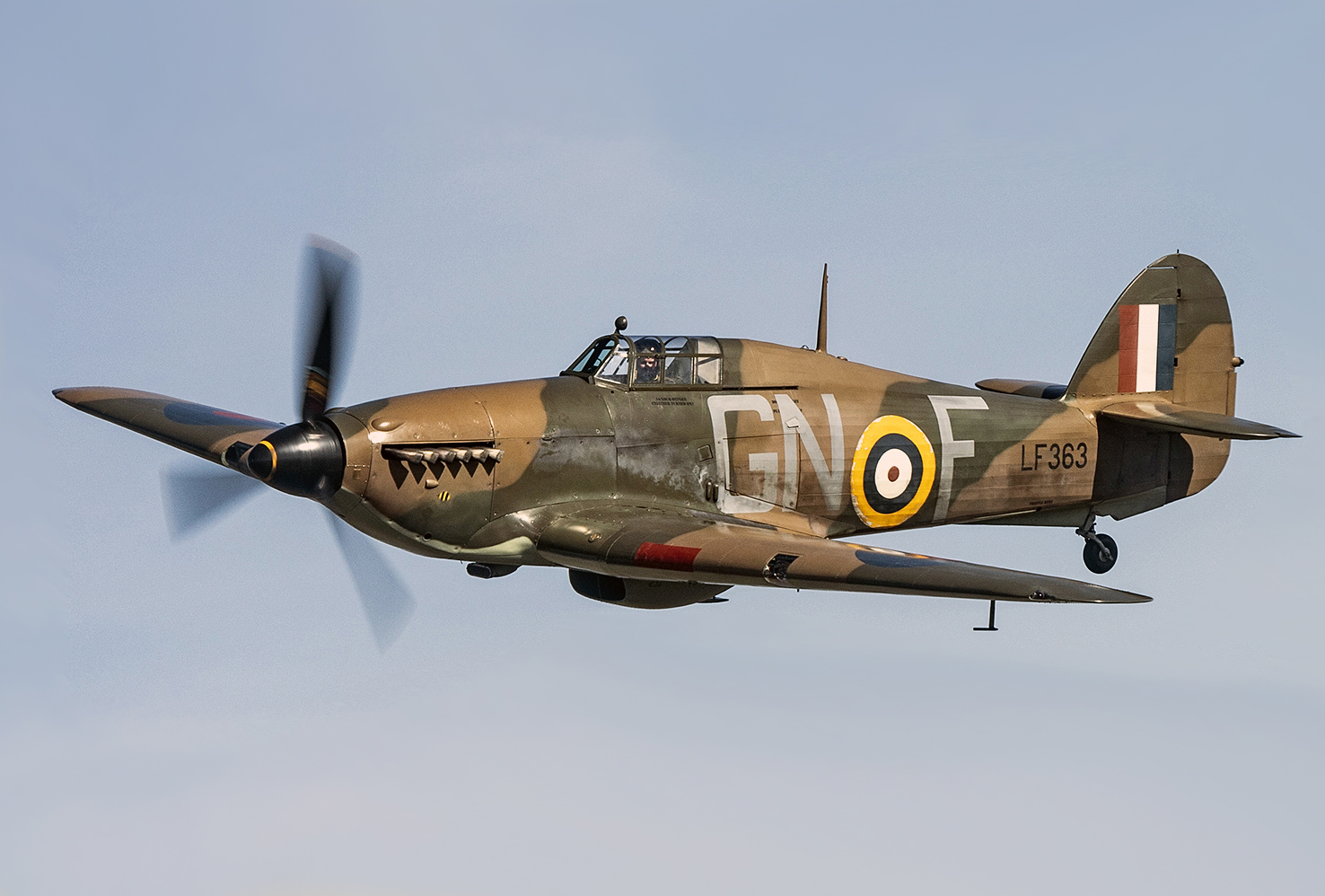
Dahl incorporates a Hawker Hurricane (which as a Royal Air Force pilot he flew during WWII) into the story

The principal character in the book, Gus, has his Hawker Hurricane fighter destroyed over the English Channel by a gremlin during the Battle of Britain, but is able to convince the gremlins as they parachute into the water that they should join forces against a common enemy, Hitler and the Nazis, rather than fight each other.

Eventually, the gremlins are re-trained by the Royal Air Force to repair rather than sabotage aircraft, and restore Gus to active flight status after a particularly severe crash. (Note: The book had an autobiographical connection as Dahl had flown as a Hurricane fighter pilot in the RAF, and was temporarily on leave from operational flying after serious injuries sustained in a crash landing in Libya. He later returned to flying.) The book also contains picturesque details about the ordinary lives of gremlins: baby gremlins, for instance, are known as widgets, and females as fifinellas, a name taken from the great "flying" filly racehorse Fifinella, that won both the Epsom Derby and Epsom Oaks in 1916, the year Dahl was born.

== Publication ==
The publication of The Gremlins by Random House consisted of a 50,000 run for the U.S. market (Note: Both paperback and hardcover versions were printed in 1943.) with Dahl ordering 50 copies for himself as promotional material, handing them out to everyone he knew, including the British Ambassador in Washington Lord Halifax, and the First Lady of the U.S. Eleanor Roosevelt, who loved to read it to her grandchildren. The book was considered an international success with 30,000 more sold in Australia but initial efforts to reprint the book were precluded by a wartime paper shortage. Reviewed in major publications, Dahl was considered a writer-of-note and his appearances in Hollywood to follow up with the film project were met with notices in Hedda Hopper's columns. (Note: In 1950, Collins Publishing (New York) published a limited reprint of The Gremlins.)

Facing copyright problems and realising that the Air Ministry's "Clause 12" in the original film contract would restrict the studio, Walt Disney, who had a personal interest in The Gremlins, reluctantly began to "wind down" the project. By August 1943, Disney had even reconsidered an animated "short" based on The Gremlins and indicated to Dahl by correspondence that further work would not continue. After a year of story conferences and related research, Dahl realised that his book would be the only tangible product emanating from the aborted film.

== Subsequent use ==
The story of gremlins appeared in Issues #33-#41 of Walt Disney's Comics and Stories published by Walt Disney Productions between June 1943 and February 1944; it contained a nine-episode series of short, silent stories featuring a Gremlin Gus as their star. The first was drawn by Vivie Risto and the rest of them by Walt Kelly. This served as their introduction to the comic book audience. These comics were subsequently reprinted in 1987 by Gladstone Publishing Ltd.

Dahl's later novel Some Time Never: A Fable for Supermen is a darker take on the same basic premise.

== Reprints ==
A special edition of the book was produced to commemorate the 60th Anniversary of the United States Air Force and was distributed exclusively through the Army and Air Force Exchange Service. The USAF special edition featured a unique dust jacket that bore the commemorative seal of the 60th USAF Anniversary. The inside flap of the dust jacket featured a brief history of the book's role in improving morale for airmen and their families. The initial distribution of the USAF 60th Anniversary commemorative edition sold out at all participating AAFES locations on the first day of sale.

== Popular culture ==
Used copies of the first edition book are highly sought after by collectors of both Roald Dahl's works and Disney's; these copies may be valued anywhere between US$100 and US$10,000.

In September 2006, Dark Horse Comics published The Gremlins: The Lost Walt Disney Production, a faithfully restored and updated version of The Gremlins including an introduction by acclaimed film historian Leonard Maltin as well as creating a series of Gremlin-inspired toys and figurines, that were patterned after the original Dahl-inspired characters as well as Return of the Gremlins, a comic sequel mini-series in which the grandson of pilot Gus meets the gremlins when inheriting his grandfather's house in England.

The gremlins appear in the Epic Mickey franchise as the mechanics of the Wasteland. Their leader Gus (voiced by Bob Joles in the first game and Cary Elwes in the second) serves as a conscience figure to Mickey (as Jiminy Cricket is to Pinocchio). Unlike in the book, the gremlins have the ability to teleport.
