= Believe It or Else =

1939 film by Fred Avery

- Title card
- Directed by: Fred Avery
- Story by: Dave Monahan
- Produced by: Leon Schlesinger
- Starring: Mel Blanc; Danny Webb
- Music by: Carl W. Stalling
- Animation by: Virgil Ross
- Color process: Technicolor
- Production company: Leon Schlesinger Productions
- Distributed by: Warner Bros. Pictures
- Release date: June 3, 1939
- Running time: 8 min
- Country: United States
- Language: English

Believe It or Else is a 1939 animated comedy short film directed by Fred Avery. It was released on June 3, 1939. It is part of the Merrie Melodies series and the eighth cartoon to feature Elmer Fudd. It is a parody of the Ripley's Believe It or Not! franchise, which The Vitaphone Corporation had previously adapted into live-action short films.

== Plot ==
The narrator, a caricature of Robert Ripley, collected individual facts from his experiences around the world to inform the audience, while being periodically disrupted by Elmer Fudd holding a sign that reads, "I don't believe it".

Holstein Cudd has consumed 50 quarts of milk a day for the last two years to the point he is only able to moo. A Hindu snake-charmer is humorously being charmed by a snake playing the flute. A man who specializes in building mini ships in bottles is seem building an actual ship from within a bottle. Adolphus Hambone, the world's loudest hog caller, calls pigs in Washington from his home in Arkansas, which they respond in song. A man has not been out of his room for 50 years, who is revealed to be simply a man in prison serving a life sentence. A Californian university student is able to use his abdomen as a basketball.

The narrator introduces an optical illusion, which does not work when the audience peeks. He then introduces a match trick, which is invalidated when he adds matches instead of simply moving them. The narrator shows a video of Mars as seen from. the Samuel Oschin telescope at Palomar Observatory, where spaceships travel through a bustling landscape, including one carrying Buck Dodgers (a caricature of Buck Rogers), who advertises his radio show. The narrator notes that there is no life on the moon, but is astonished to find a trio of singers who are on their way to a radio show at Cleveland but had lost their way.

The narrator finds a wishing well in Egypt, where a man wishes for a million dollars, which the wishing well wish it had the money to give him in the first place. The world's fastest wood-chopper, Chopoffski, chops what seems to be a large tree but is actually a stump as demonstration. Nathaniel Nevermiss, the country's most accurate knife-thrower, accidentally kills his sidekick while demonstrating his prowess. He then introduces the live "berth" of a baby, and the noises of an ant, who screams loudly for his mate. Finally, he introduces Horace Buzzsaw, who can saw a man in half and uses a passing Elmer as demonstration. Elmer believes it to be fake, only for his legs to run off as he chases it out of the stage.

== Cast ==
- Mel Blanc as Hog Caller, Buck Dodgers, Major Bowes, Wishing Well, Knife Thower, Ant
- Danny Webb as Elmer Fudd, Old Man in Jail, Chippofoski
- Cliff Nazarro as Narrator

== Availability ==
- LaserDisc - The Golden Age of Looney Tunes, Vol. 3, Side 8: The Evolution of Egghead

== See also ==
- Elmer Fudd filmography
- Looney Tunes and Merrie Melodies filmography (1930–1939)
