= Ripley's Believe It or Not! =

American media franchise

Logo used since 2023

Ripley's Believe It or Not! is an American franchise founded by Robert Ripley, which deals with bizarre events and items that readers might question the claims. Originally a newspaper panel, the Believe It or Not feature proved popular and was later adapted into a wide variety of formats, including radio, film, television, comic books, a chain of museums, and a book-series.

The Ripley collection includes 20,000 photographs, 30,000 artifacts and more than 100,000 cartoon panels. With 80-plus attractions, the Orlando, Florida-based Ripley Entertainment, Inc. (a division of the Jim Pattison Group) hosts more than 12 million guests annually. Ripley Entertainment's publishing and broadcast divisions oversee a number of projects, including the syndicated TV series, the newspaper cartoon panel, books, posters, and games.

== Syndicated feature panel ==
Ripley's Believe It or Not!
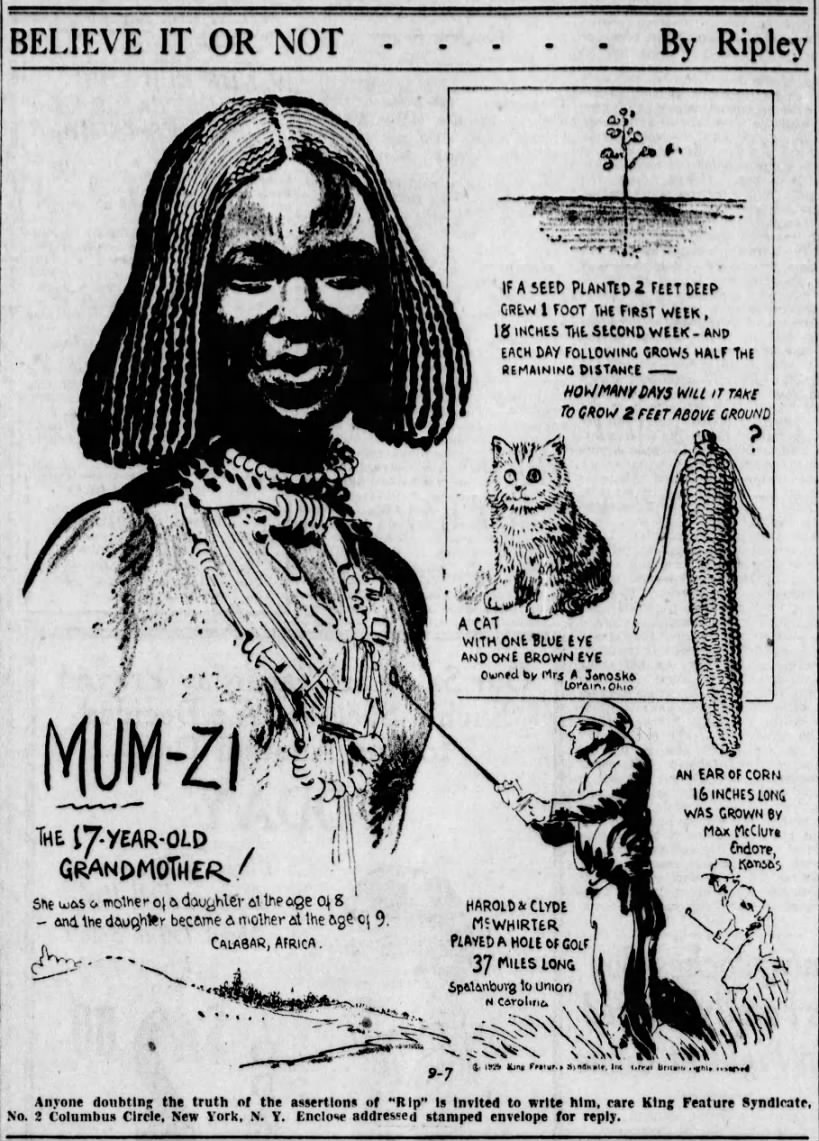
- Robert Ripley's Believe It or Not (September 7, 1929)
- Authors: Robert Ripley (1919–1949); Paul Frehm (1949–1978); Walter Frehm (1978–1989); Don Wimmer (1989–2004); John Graziano (2004–2021); Kieran Castaño (2021–2026)
- Launch date: December 19, 1918 (107 years ago)
- Alternate name(s): Champs and Chumps (1918–1919)
- Syndicates: Associated Newspapers (1924–1929); King Features Syndicate (1930–1989); United Feature Syndicate (1989–present)
- Genre: Bizarre facts

Ripley called his cartoon feature (originally involving sports feats) Champs and Chumps when it premiered on December 19, 1918 in The New York Globe. He began adding items unrelated to sports and in October 1919, he changed the title to Believe It or Not. When the Globe folded in 1923, he moved to the New York Evening Post. In 1924, the panel began being syndicated by Associated Newspapers (formed as part of a cooperative that had included the Globe). That same year, Ripley hired Norbert Pearlroth as his researcher, and Pearlroth spent the next 52 years of his life in the New York Public Library, working ten hours a day and six days a week in order to find unusual facts for Ripley.

Other writers and researchers included Lester Byck. In 1930, Ripley moved to the New York American and was picked up by the King Features Syndicate, being quickly syndicated on an international basis.

Ripley died in 1949; those working on the syndicated newspaper panel after his death included Paul Frehm (1938–1978; he became the full-time artist in 1949), and his brother Walter Frehm (1948–1989); Walter worked part-time with his brother Paul and became a full-time Ripley artist from 1978 to 1989. Others who assisted included Clem Gretter (1941–1949), Bob Clarke (1943–1944), Joe Campbell (1946–1956), Art Sloggatt (1971–1975), Carl Dorese, and Stan Randall. Paul Frehm won the National Cartoonists Society's Newspaper Panel Cartoon Award for 1976 for his work on the series. Clarke later created parodies of Believe It or Not! for Mad, as did Wally Wood and Ernie Kovacs, who also did a recurring satire called "Strangely Believe It!" on his TV programs. Other strips and books borrowed the Ripley design and format, such as Ralph Graczak's Our Own Oddities, John Hix's Strange as It Seems, and Gordon Johnston's It Happened in Canada. Don Wimmer took up the panel from 1989 to 2004, John Graziano from 2005 to 2021, and Kieran Castaño from 2021 until February 2026.

At the peak of its popularity, the syndicated feature was read daily by about 80 million readers; during the first three weeks of May 1932 alone, Ripley received over two million pieces of fan mail. Dozens of paperback editions reprinting the newspaper panels have been published over the decades. Recent Ripley's Believe It or Not! books containing new material have supplemented illustrations with photographs.

Peanuts creator Charles M. Schulz's first publication of artwork was published by Ripley. It was a cartoon claiming his dog Spike was "a hunting dog who eats pins, tacks, screws, nails and razor blades". The dog would later became the model for Snoopy.

== Books ==
Some notable books include:

- Ripley's Believe It or Not (1929), reprinted in 2004
- Ripley's Mammoth Book of Believe It or Not (1953)
- Ripley's Giant Book of Believe It or Not (1976)
- Ripley's 35th Anniversary Believe It or Not (1954)
- Ripley's 50th Anniversary Believe It or Not (1968)
- Ripley's Believe It or Not Special Edition 2012 (2011)

A series of paperback books containing annotated sketches from the newspaper feature:

- Ripley's Believe It or Not 1st Series (1941)
- Ripley's Believe It or Not 2nd Series (1948)
- Ripley's Believe It or Not 3rd Series (1954)
- Ripley's Believe It or Not 4th Series (1982)

Ripley Entertainment produces a range of books featuring unusual facts, news stories and photographs. In 2004, Ripley Entertainment founded Ripley Publishing Ltd, based in the United Kingdom, to publish new Believe It or Not titles. The company produces the New York Times bestselling Ripley's Believe It or Not! Annuals, the children's fiction series Ripley's RBI, an educational series called the Ripley's Twists, the Ripley's Believe It or Not! Special Edition in conjunction with Scholastic USA and a number of other titles. At the height of his popularity, Robert Ripley received thousands of letters a day from the public and Ripley Entertainment continues to encourage submissions from readers who have strange stories and photographs that could be featured in Ripley's Believe It or Not! books and media.

The people whose items are featured in such books as Strikingly True have what Edward Meyer, Vice President of Exhibits and Archives at Ripley Entertainment Inc., describes as an obsession: "Whatever it is they're after, it is so important to them that all the rest of the world can go on without them. They want to make something that makes them immortal, makes them a little different than you and me". Despite the wide range of true and unbelievable art, sculpture, photographs, interactive devices, animal oddities, and recycled objects contained within the collection, alien or witchcraft-type stories are rarely considered as they are (according to Meyers) difficult to prove. To be included in Ripley's Believe It or Not books, museums or television shows, items must undergo scrutiny from the staff and be 100% authenticated.

== Comic books ==
In 1953, Harvey Comics published the first Ripley's Believe It or Not! comic book, titled Ripley's Believe It or Not! Magazine and lasted for four issues until March 1954.

From June 1965 until February 1980, Gold Key Comics published the second Ripley's Believe It or Not! comic book, which lasted for 94 issues. George Wilson drew several covers for the comic book series.

In 2002, Dark Horse Comics published the third Ripley's Believe It or Not! comic book, written by Haden Blackman, which lasted for three issues and was later collected in a trade paperback published by Dark Horse in May 2003, entitled Ripley's Believe It or Not! (ISBN 1-56971-909-8)

In 2015, Zenescope published a two issue comic edited by Terry Kavanagh.

== Radio ==
On April 14, 1930, Ripley brought Believe It or Not to radio, the first of several series heard on NBC, CBS and the Mutual Broadcasting System. As noted by the website Ripley On Radio, Ripley's broadcasts varied in length from 15 minutes to 30 minutes and aired in multiple different formats. When Ripley's 1930 debut on The Collier Hour brought a strong listener reaction, he was given a Monday night NBC series beginning April 14, 1930, followed by a 1931–32 series airing twice a week. After his strange stories were dramatized on NBC's Saturday Party, Ripley was the host of The Baker's Broadcast from 1935 to 1937. He was scheduled in several different 1937–38 NBC timeslots and then took to the road with popular remote broadcasts. See America First with Bob Ripley (1938–40) on CBS expanded geographically into See All the Americas, a 1942 program with Latin music. In 1944, he was heard five nights a week on Mutual in shows with an emphasis on World War II. Romance, Rhythm and Ripley aired on CBS in 1945, followed by Pages from Robert L. Ripley's Radio Scrapbook (1947–48).

Robert Ripley is known for several radio firsts. He was the first to broadcast nationwide on a radio network from mid-ocean and he also participated in the first broadcast from Buenos Aires to New York City. Assisted by a corps of translators, he was the first to broadcast to every nation in the world simultaneously.

As the years went on, the show became less about oddities and featured guest-driven entertainment such as comedy routines. Sponsors over the course of the program included Pall Mall cigarettes and General Foods. The program ended its successful run in 1948 as Ripley prepared to convert the show format to television.

== Films, television, Internet, and computer game ==
The newspaper feature has been adapted into more than a few films and TV shows.

=== Film ===
- Ripley hosted a series of two dozen Believe It or Not! theatrical short films between 1930 and 1932 for Warner Bros. Pictures and The Vitaphone Corporation. A 2-DVD release featuring 24 of these theatrical shorts is available in the United States beginning March 16, 2010, from Warner Home Video, through their Warner Archive manufacture-on-demand program. Directors on the shorts included Murray Roth (on the first five), Roy Mack and Alfred J. Goulding (latter half of second season). Leo Donnelly assisted later on commentary.
- He also appeared in a Vitaphone musical short, Seasons Greetings (1931), with Ruth Etting, Joe Penner, Ted Husing, Thelma White, Ray Collins, and others.
- Ripley's short films were parodied in a 1939 Warner Bros. Merrie Melodies cartoon titled Believe It or Else. Released on June 25, 1939, directed by Tex Avery and written by Dave Monahan, it featured a running gag in which a prototype Elmer Fudd appeared to declare, "I don't believe it!" On November 5 of the same year, another Avery documentary parody, Fresh Fish, was released. Written by Jack Miller, this cartoon's running gag was a two-headed fish that kept swimming onto the screen to ask, "Pardon me, but can you tell me where I can find Mister Ripley?"
- 20th Century Fox produced another short film, Acquitted by the Sea, that was produced by Truman Talley and directed by Earl Allvine. It was released on September 27, 1940 and told an unusual story involving the Titanic.

==== Proposed film ====
In October 2004, Paramount Pictures announced plans for a film that would chronicle the life of Robert Ripley. The film was to be produced by James Jacks and his Alphaville Films company, associated with Paramount. Scott Alexander and Larry Karaszewski were hired to write the script. Jacks explained: "It's about the exploits of Robert Ripley, one of the most popular newspaper cartoonists in the '30s and '40s, who was well known for going around the world and looking for oddities and getting into adventures while doing so. We want to make a series of movies that, if not quite the truth, are the adventures that should have happened. We want to turn it into an Indiana Jones, a goofy version, as played by Johnny Depp. When they saw we had the writers from Larry Flynt, they thought that we wanted to make the kinky version, but we saw a chance to do a Spielberg-type movie with one of their characters."

In November 2005, Tim Burton was attached to direct the film, with Jim Carrey starring as Robert Ripley. Filming was to begin in October 2006, for a 2007 release. Paramount hinted that the film, if successful, could be the start of a Ripley's film series. In addition to Jacks, Sean Daniel and Richard D. Zanuck were to serve as producers for the film. Zanuck spent six weeks in China to scout filming locations for the project.

In June 2006, Paramount delayed the start of production on the film for at least a year because its projected budget went over the allowed $150 million. Carrey had waived his entire upfront salary to help keep costs low, but the project remained over budget. Burton and Carrey also wanted to have Alexander and Karaszewski make changes to the film's script to focus more on Ripley's Believe It or Not column. Carrey was adamant on avoiding what happened with his previous project Fun with Dick and Jane, which required reshoots and additional editing as a result of beginning production without a script. Filming had been scheduled to begin in China in November 2006. Although Paramount could have delayed production to spring 2007, the film was delayed further to allow Burton to film Sweeney Todd.

In December 2006, Burton and Carrey approved writer Steve Oedekerk to rewrite the script. Oedekerk had worked with Carrey on several previous projects. Production was to begin in China in winter 2008, for a 2009 release. Later in January, Zanuck said he was no longer involved with the project, and that he was unaware that it was proceeding. Oedekerk's draft was completed in June 2007, and was approved that month by Paramount, Burton, and Carrey. At that time, Carrey hoped to have production finished by summer 2008. Later that month, Paramount was searching for a new director.

In October 2008, Chris Columbus pitched an idea for the film that was approved by Carrey and Paramount. Columbus' idea involved scrapping the previous China-based storyline entirely. Negotiations were underway that month to hire Columbus as director, with plans to hire a writer afterwards. Paramount planned to release the film in 2011, and hoped that it would be the start of a Ripley's film series. In January 2011, Eric Roth was hired to write the script, with Carrey still attached to star. Ken Atchity and Chi-Li Wong joined the project as producers, alongside Jacks and Daniel.

=== Television ===
- The first Believe It or Not TV series, a live show hosted by Ripley, premiered on the NBC television network on March 1, 1949. Shortly after the 13th episode, on May 27, Ripley died of a heart-attack and several of his friends substituted as host, including future Ripley's Believe It or Not! president Doug Storer. Robert St. John served as host from the second season until the series ended on October 5, 1950.
- In 1956, an unsold pilot was made by Trident Productions. Stories include the invention of streptomycin and a story on George Gershwin.
- A revival of the original series, Ripley's Believe It or Not!, aired from 1982 to 1986 on the ABC television network. Based on three pilots/specials conceived, produced and directed by Ron Lyon and Jack Haley, Jr. (1980–81), the series was a Haley/Lyon/Rastar production in association with Columbia Pictures Television. Featuring film star Jack Palance who hosted the popular series throughout its run, the series had three different co-hosts who appeared from season to season (initially actress Catherine Shirriff, followed by Palance's daughter, Holly Palance, and later singer Marie Osmond). The 1980s series reran on the British and American versions of the Sci-Fi Channel during the 1990s; it last aired on NBCUniversal's horror/suspense-themed cable channel Chiller.
- A Canadian animated series, Ripley's Believe It or Not!, was produced for Fox Family in 1999 by Cinar (now WildBrain), and followed the adventures of "Michael Ripley", Robert Ripley's nephew. The show was aimed at a younger audience, and would often feature Michael going around the world.
- Another revival, once again titled Ripley's Believe It or Not!, aired from 2000 to 2003, produced by Columbia TriStar Television and shown on TBS. Hosted by actor Dean Cain, executive-produced by Dan Jbara and co-executive-produced by Dennis Lortz, the series took a slightly more sensationalistic approach to its subject matter and "premiered as the highest-rated original series on cable" at that time. The series was canceled in October 2003 after four seasons. Like the previous syndicated live-action series, this latest edition was later aired on The Biography Channel, Chiller and Decades for reruns.
- In 2006, the Philippines made a local adaptation of Ripley's Believe it or Not! with a local host. ABC 5 (now known as TV5) was the first to make it with Raymond Bagatsing as host. The show however was short-lived.
- In 2008, GMA Network bought the rights and revived Ripley's Believe It or Not! in the Philippines. This time Chris Tiu of the Ateneo Blue Eagles was chosen as host. It is part of the Bilib Ka Ba? Nights/Araw-araw (Do You Believe? Nights/Daily) programming block of the network which premiered on August 18, 2008, and lasted until September 22, 2010.
- In 2012, a composite parody of Ripley's Believe It or Not! and Guinness World Records dubbed The Guinness O'Ripley Enormous Book of Curiosities, Oddities, and World Records served as the focus of the SpongeBob SquarePants episode "Squirrel Record", in which the title character assists his friend Sandy Cheeks in breaking the records within.
- Another revival, Ripley's Believe It or Not! (produced by Texas Crew Productions with Bruce Campbell as host), premiered on the Travel Channel in 2019.

=== Internet and games ===
- A point-and-click adventure computer game, Ripley's Believe It or Not!: The Riddle of Master Lu, was published and developed by Sanctuary Woods and released in 1995.
- In 2004, a Ripley's Believe It or Not! pinball machine was released.
- In 2006, the Ripleys.com website held a "Dear Mr. Ripley" contest in which contestants submitted "unbelievable" stories and with a public vote selecting a winner. The submissions included stories about a two-faced kitten, a car hurdler, a painting on human flesh canvas, a snake swallowing a golf ball, an unopened deck of cards in a thin-necked bottle, a collector of Converse shoes with over 400 pairs, a man who survived a dump truck falling on him, a painting made of nail polish, a child who played sports while hopping on a pogo stick, and a tongue swallower. The winners were announced on December 15 of the same year.

== Museums ("Odditoriums") ==
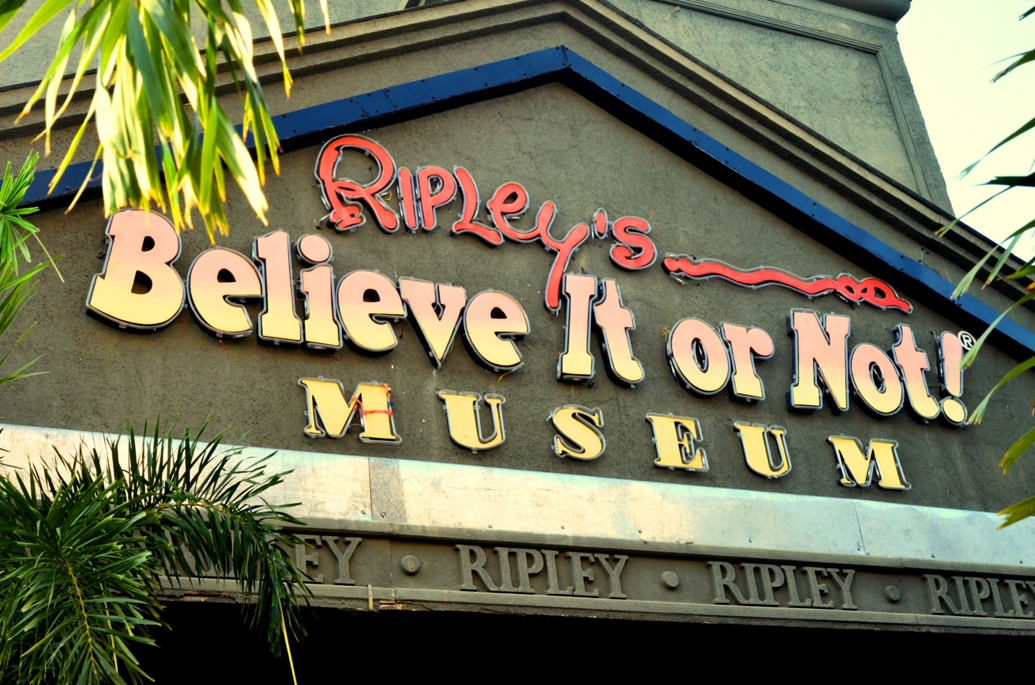
Ripley's Believe It Or Not museum at Innovative Film City in Bangalore, India

When Ripley first displayed his collection to the public at the Chicago World's Fair in 1933, it was labeled Ripley's Odditorium and attracted over two million visitors during the run of the fair (in an apparent promotional gimmick, beds were provided in the Odditorium for people who "fainted" daily). That successful exhibition led to trailer shows across the country during the 1930s and his collections were exhibited at a number of major fairs and expositions, including San Francisco, San Diego, Dallas, and Cleveland. In New York City, the famed Times Square exhibit opened in 1939 on Broadway. In 1950, a year after Ripley's death, the first permanent Odditorium opened in St. Augustine, Florida. The Odditorium is housed in the Castle Warden, built in 1888 by an associate of Henry Flagler, President of the Florida East Coast Railway.

As of May 2023, there are 28 Ripley's Believe It or Not! Odditoriums around the world. Odditoriums (in the spirit of Believe It or Not!) are often more than simple museums cluttered with curiosities. Some include theaters and arcades, such as the ones in Gatlinburg, Tennessee, and Wisconsin Dells, Wisconsin. Others are constructed oddly, such as the Orlando, Florida, Odditorium which is built off-level as if the building is sinking (a commemoration of a sinkhole that opened on the site while construction was in progress).

=== Asia ===
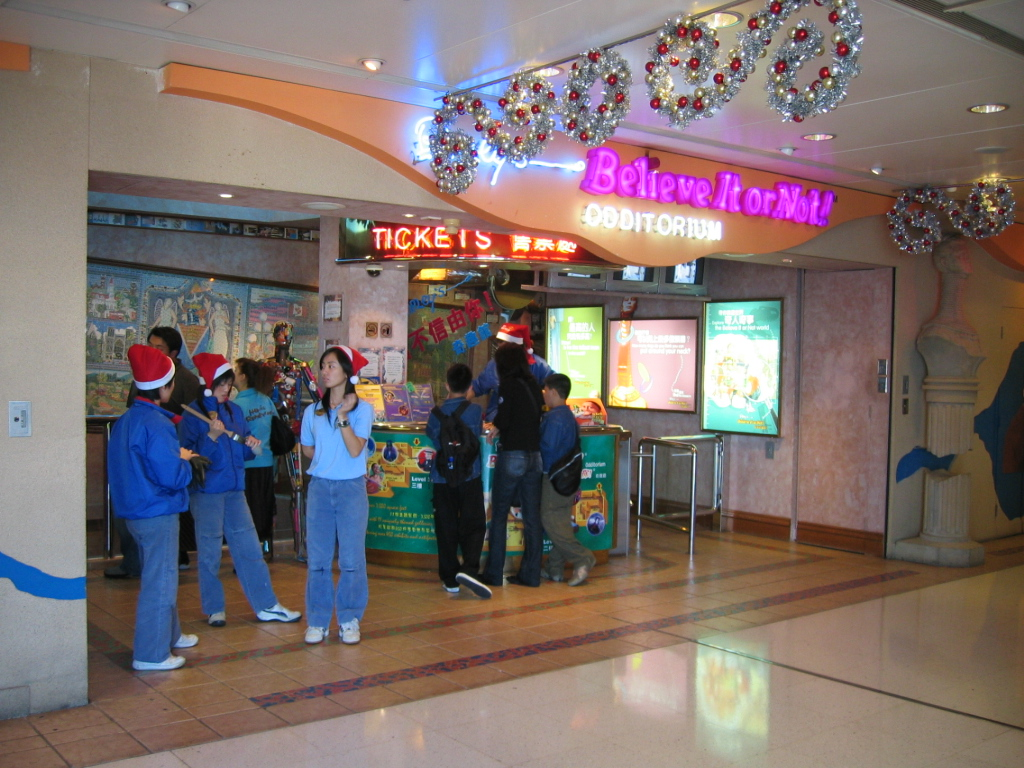
Hong Kong Ripley's Believe It or Not! Odditorium in 2004

Alphabetical, by country or district:

- Shanghai, China (closed) – This location was located at Huangpu River.
- Victoria Peak, Hong Kong (closed) – There was an Odditorium in The Peak that opened in 1998 and closed on March 20, 2005.
- Jakarta, Indonesia (closed) – This location (called the "Fun Odditorium") was located in the Pondok Indah Mall complex. It was the largest Ripley's Odditorium in the world (2,000 m^{2}; 22,000 sq ft). It opened on September 28, 1995 and closed in the late 1990s due to the 1997 Asian financial crisis.
- Genting Highlands, Malaysia – This location was located in the First World Plaza. It reopened as Ripley's Adventureland located on level 4 in SkyAvenue.
- Mandaluyong, Philippines (closed) – This location was in the Shangri-La Mall in Ortigas and was closed after the end of its franchising agreement.
- Jeju Island, South Korea (closed) – This is located at the Jeju Jungmun resort.
- Pattaya, Thailand – This is located at Pattaya's Royal Garden Plaza. It appears as if an airplane has crashed into it.

=== Europe ===
==== Denmark ====
- Copenhagen – This location is a smaller one located close to the city hall and next to a museum of Hans Christian Andersen.

==== The Netherlands ====
- Amsterdam – This location opened on June 23, 2016, at the Dam Square, Dam 21, in a building that belongs to the Heritage of Amsterdam. It has more than 500 exhibits.

==== United Kingdom ====
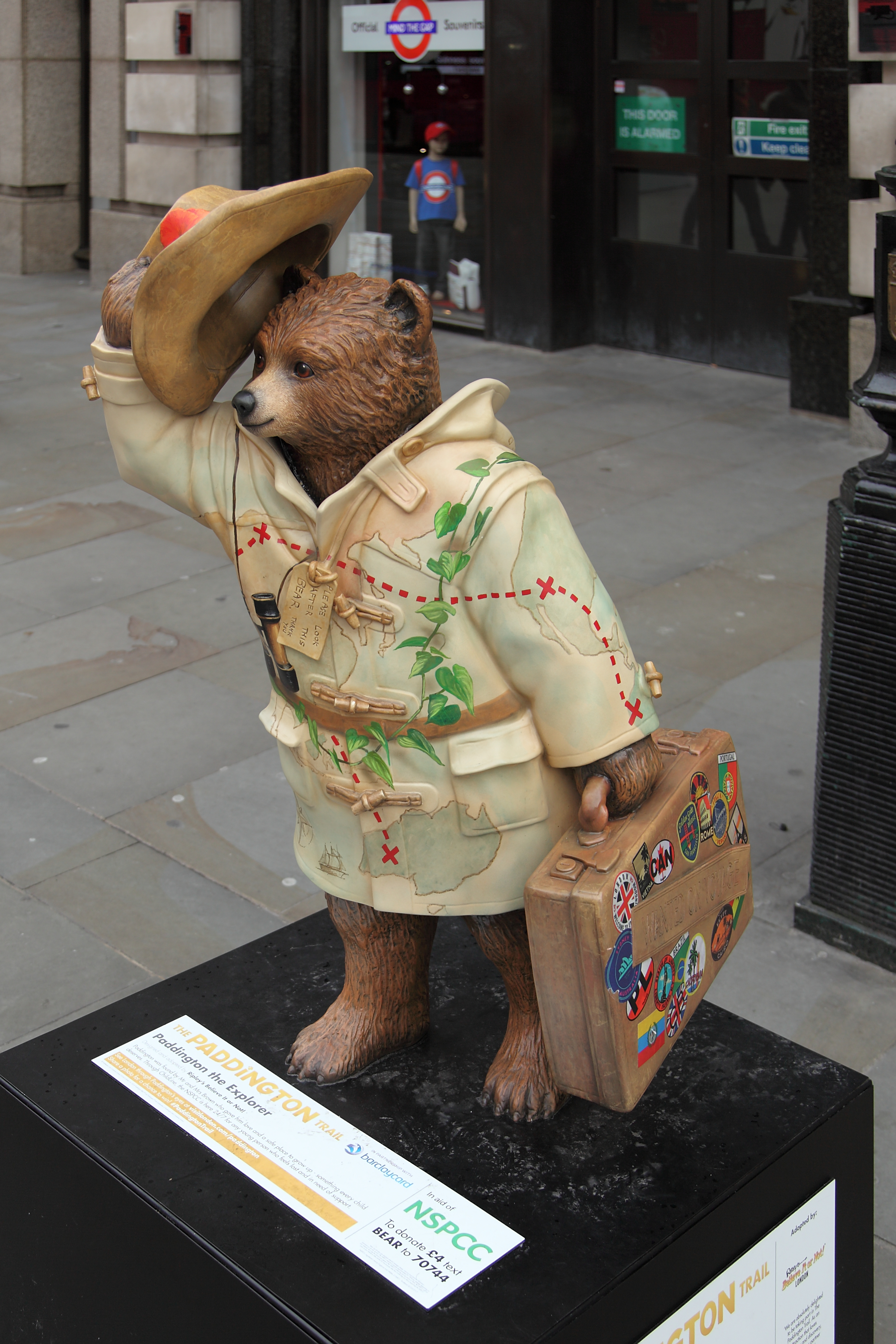
A "Ripley's Believe It or Not!"-designed Paddington Bear statue in London, one of fifty auctioned for the NSPCC

- Blackpool – Located at Blackpool Pleasure Beach, this location is based in the popular holiday destination of Blackpool.
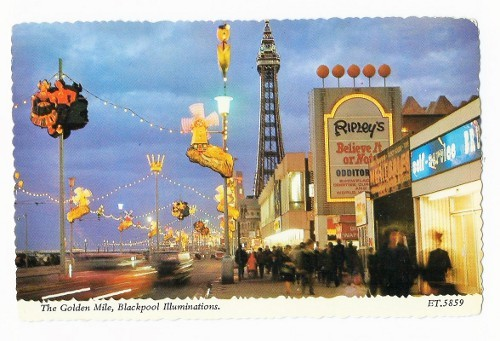
  The Golden Mile, Blackpool Illuminations 1977. Ripley's Believe It or Not!

It was located further north in the 1980s at a location adjacent to Central Pier.

- Great Yarmouth (closed) – There was an Odditorium in Great Yarmouth on the east coast of England. It opened in 1993 and closed in 1997. It is now an indoor miniature golf course that uses some of the leftovers from the Odditorium as scenery for the holes.
- London (closed) – This location was the world's largest and it opened on August 20, 2008 at the London Pavilion and closed on September 25, 2017. It housed over 500 exhibits. It was famed for its large collection of Marilyn Monroe's personal belongings and interactive exhibits over five floors, including a mirror maze and illusion tunnel.

=== Middle East ===
- Kuwait City, Kuwait (closed) – This location was located in the Hadiqat Al Sheaab Amusement Park.
- Dubai, United Arab Emirates – This is located in Global Village features a mirror maze and a moving 4D theater.

=== North America ===
==== Canada ====
- Cavendish, Prince Edward Island – This is located in a concentrated area of tourist attractions adjacent to the Prince Edward Island National Park. A lighthouse (the top being broken) features the Ripley's sign. The museum is adjoined to a wax museum and also features a mini-golf attraction.

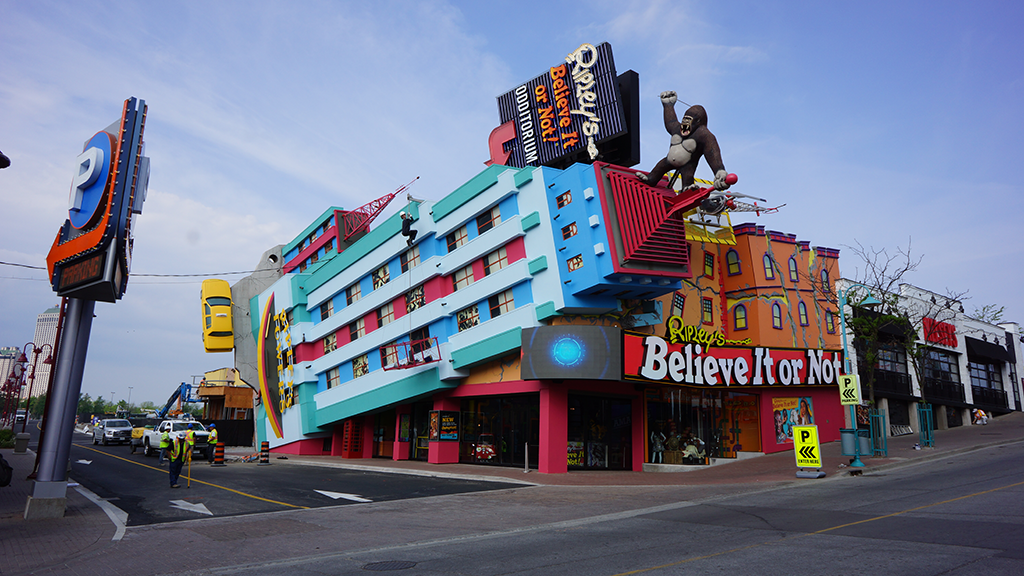
Ripley's Believe it or Not! Odditorium in Niagara Falls

- Niagara Falls, Ontario – This location is shaped like a toppled over Empire State Building with King Kong standing on top of it. This is the second oldest Ripley's Museum in the world and is one of three in Canada. The museum was closed for major renovations between November 2015 and May 2016. The newly updated museum is the largest and most valuable museum for the company. Located across the street is a Ripley's Selfie Studio, and up the street there is a Louis Tussaud's Wax Works which is owned by Ripley's.
- Toronto, Ontario – The Ripley's Aquarium of Canada opened in October 2013 next to the CN Tower and Metro Toronto Convention Centre. The 150,000-square-foot (14,000 m^{2}) structure boasts the longest underwater tunnel in North America. The aquarium was originally set to open in Niagara Falls, Ontario (near Great Wolf Lodge) in 2007, but relocated to Toronto.

==== Mexico ====
- Guadalajara – Opened in 1994, this location is a small one like Mexico City's location. It is near downtown.
- Mexico City – Opened in 1992, this location is shaped like a medieval castle and has 14 exhibition halls within it. This was the first of three locations to open in Latin America.
- Veracruz – Opened in 2011, this location is small and available in a mall with the associated Veracruz Aquarium and Wax Museum, has 150 figures on display, and features a mirror maze and rotating tunnel.
- Cancún – Opened in 2021, this location is in La Isla Mall and features a mirror maze and laser maze.

==== United States ====
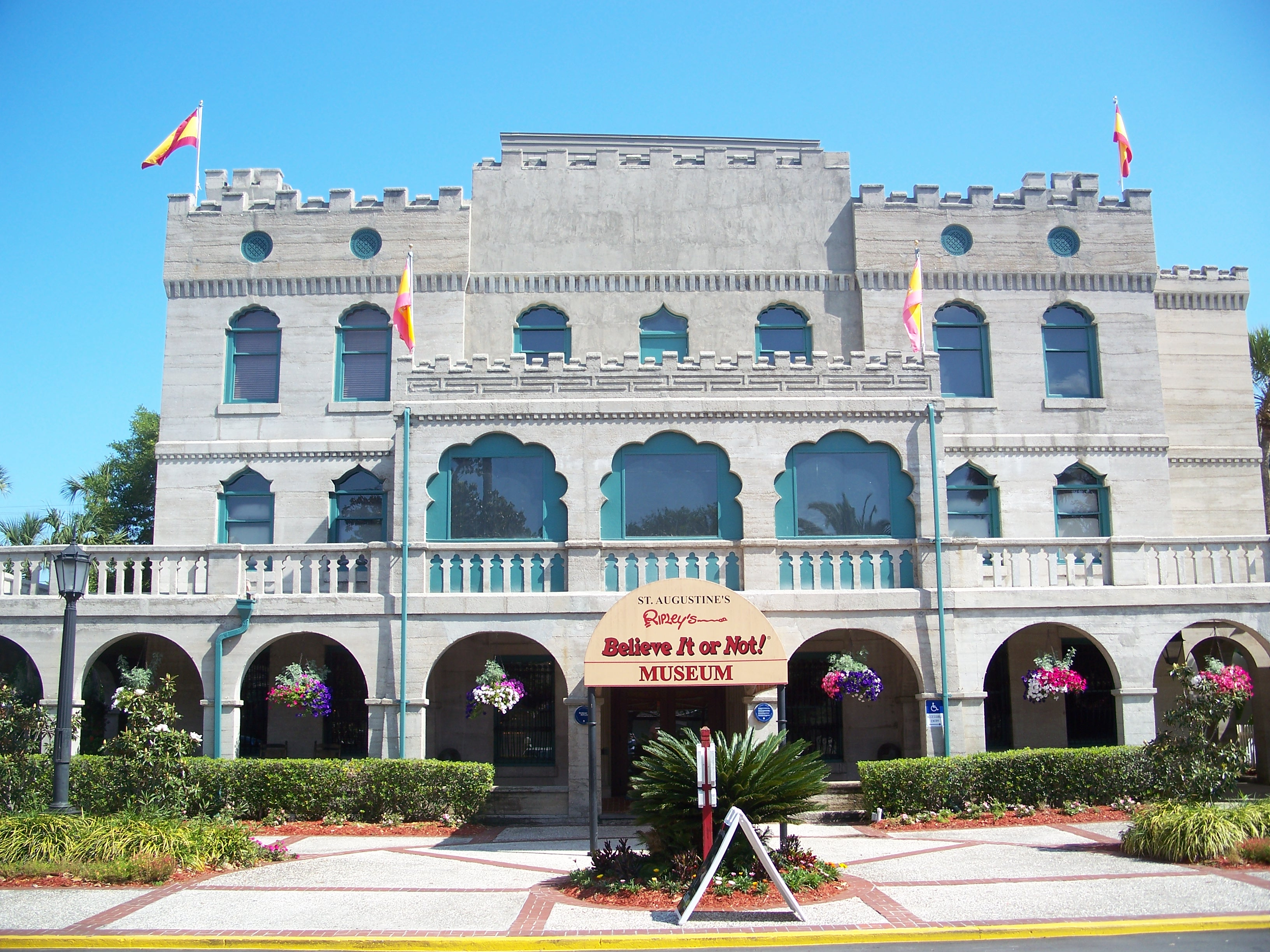
St. Augustine, Florida, Odditorium

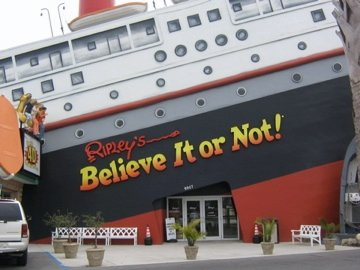
Panama City Beach, Florida, Odditorium

Ripley's shark being produced for the Ocean City location

===== California =====
- Buena Park (closed) – This location was located in Buena Park's E-Zone district on Beach Boulevard, close to Knott's Berry Farm. It opened in August 1990 and closed on March 30, 2009.
- Hollywood – This location is in the Bank of America Building on Hollywood Boulevard.
- San Francisco – This location is near Fisherman's Wharf, San Francisco.

===== Florida =====
- Key West (closed) – Opened on April 15, 1993 in the former Strand Theatre, this location was located on Duval Street. It then relocated to the former Planet Hollywood building nearby on July 6, 2003. It closed permanently in 2020 due to the COVID-19 pandemic.
- Orlando – Opened in July 1992, this is located on the busy International Drive tourist corridor and is built to appear as though it is dropping into a sinkhole.
- Panama City Beach – Opened in June 2006, this location is at the intersection of Front Beach Road, Middle Beach Road and Thomas Drive on Panama City Beach and is designed to look like a 1950s luxury cruise liner that has run aground on the beach. It also has a moving 4D theater.
- St. Augustine – This is the oldest Ripley's Believe It or Not! Odditorium, located in the Castle Warden. It was purchased shortly after Ripley's death in 1949 and opened in 1950. Before becoming home to his vast collections from his travels, "The Castle", as it is known, was once a hotel which played host to a number of famous guests, including Ripley and author/owner Marjorie Kinnan Rawlings. It was originally a Moorish Revival style mansion, built in 1887 by millionaire William G. Warden as a winter home. Its popularity and success led Ripley's associates to open new establishments throughout the United States and the world. Perhaps not surprisingly, it is rumored to be haunted. Segments of the most recent Ripley's TV series were filmed here, including the opening credits. Among the attractions here are a mummified cat, a 1/12 scale model of the original Ferris wheel made out of erector sets, life and death masks of famous celebrities (including Abraham Lincoln), and shamanistic apparati from cultures around the world.

===== Illinois =====
- Chicago (closed) – Opened on November 21, 1968, this location was located on Wells Street in the Chicago Old Town area until its closure in 1987.

===== Maryland =====
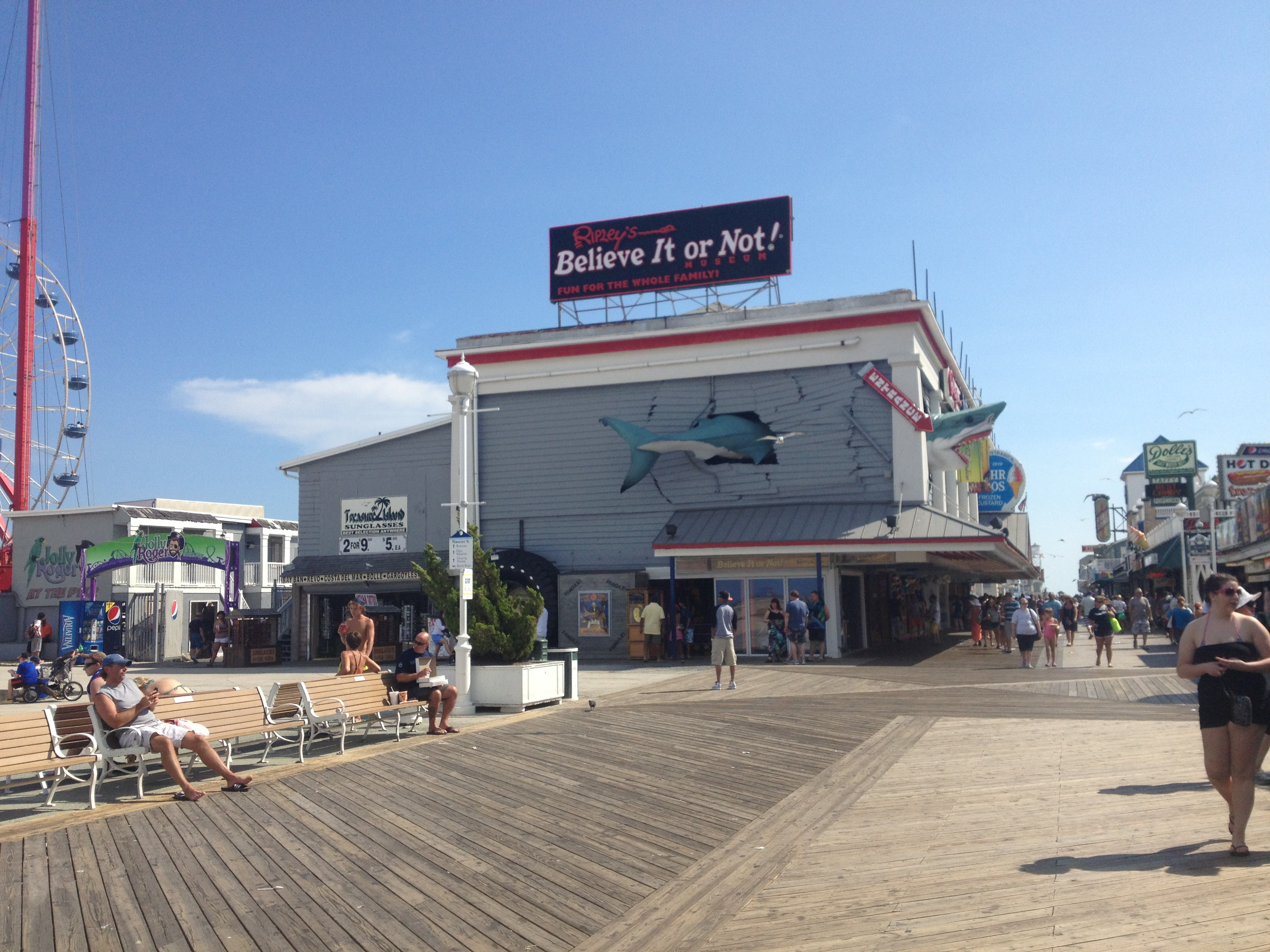
Ripley's Believe It or Not! Odditorium in Ocean City, Maryland

- Baltimore (closed) – This location opened on June 26, 2012, in the Light Street Pavilion's former food court at Harborplace in the Inner Harbor. The museum's entrance featured a sculpture of a sea monster known as Chessie. It was dismantled and closed permanently in May 2020.
- Ocean City – This location opened in 2001 and is located on the boardwalk at Wicomico Street. It is a popular destination for tourists and it sits at the entrance to Jolly Roger's Pier Amusement Park. It features a large model of a shark that appears as if it has crashed through the museum.

===== Missouri =====
- Branson – This location looks like a stone edifice that was cracked by an earthquake.

===== Nevada =====
- Las Vegas (closed) – Located at the Four Queens hotel-casino, it opened on October 1, 1985, and closed in 1993.

===== New Jersey =====
- Atlantic City (closed) – This location was located on the Boardwalk. It opened in late June 1996 and closed on December 31, 2022.

===== New York =====
- New York City (closed) – This location opened in Manhattan on 42nd Street in July 2007. This was the largest Ripley's in the world, housing over 1000 authentic artifacts and interactive exhibits. It closed on November 28, 2021.

===== Oregon =====
- Newport – This location was funded by Jacob Walters and built in 1986. It is at the Historic Bayfront and one of two amusements known as Mariner Square, the other being Wax Works.

===== South Carolina =====
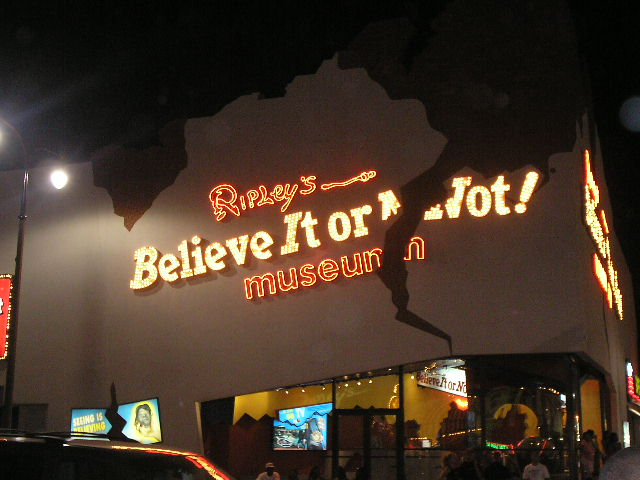
Odditorium in Myrtle Beach

- Myrtle Beach – The artifact museum is located near the center of Myrtle Beach's Ocean Boulevard. It opened in 1976. Also in Myrtle Beach is Ripley's Crazy Golf, a mirror maze, Ripley's Haunted Adventure, Ripley's Illusion Lab, and Ripley's Aquarium of Myrtle Beach. The aquarium, opened in 1997 at Broadway at the Beach, does scientific research and veterinary care for sharks, turtles and other fish.

===== Tennessee =====
- Gatlinburg – The original museum was built in 1970. On July 14, 1992, a fire started from a neon light fixture in a neighboring T-shirt shop. It quickly spread and engulfed a total of twelve businesses in one city block and damaged almost every building along the main street. From that Tuesday night to Wednesday morning, firefighters managed to get the situation under control, but the Ripley's Odditorium was one of the twelve to be completely consumed. Some of Ripley's most prized and unique possessions were lost in the fire, although some artifacts were able to be salvaged. The museum was rebuilt and opened in 1994 with nearly twice the amount of exhibit space, plus a tribute to the city's firefighters included among the collections. Artifacts salvaged from the blaze sport decals saying "I Survived the Fire". As with other Ripley museums, it has an architectural theme by looking as if it has survived a major earthquake, with interior and exterior feature cracks throughout. The Ripley's Company has since opened several other attractions in the Gatlinburg-Pigeon Forge area, including a "four-dimensional" theater, a state-of-the-art aquarium, a haunted factory, several arcades, two miniature golf courses, and a mirror maze, all of which carry the Ripley's brand name and logo.

===== Texas =====
- Grand Prairie – This is located at 601 East Safari Parkway in Grand Prairie, Texas. It is west of downtown Dallas on IH-30 and is on the northwest intersection of Belt Line Road and IH-30, 7 miles (11 km) east of Six Flags Over Texas.
- San Antonio – This is located across from the historic Alamo. Next door is Louis Tussaud's Waxworks and just a short walk down the road is Ripley's Haunted Adventure.

===== Virginia =====
- Williamsburg – This location opened in 2006. It has 11 galleries and over 350 exhibits. There was also a 4D theater that shows 3D movies with added effects (air, water, scent, etc.), however this feature is no longer open.

===== Wisconsin =====
- Wisconsin Dells – This location is owned by Concept Attractions. It opened in May 1990. The exterior of the original museum is designed as a temple with a plane crashed into its side. It feature 3 floors with 11 galleries with illusions and puzzles. It is located on Broadway, the downtown strip of Wisconsin Dells. The museum recently relocated to a larger building about two doors from its original location on July 8, 2023.

=== Oceania ===
==== Australia ====
- Gold Coast – This location is at the popular tourist destination Surfers Paradise. It reopened in the new Soul Centre on January 22, 2010, featuring a band of human oddities playing songs at the entrance.

== Inaccuracies ==
Authorities at the company insist that they thoroughly investigate everything and ensure their accuracy before they publish their research. This is emphasized on its television show, where they often say "If you see it on Ripley's, you can bet that it's real". However, two claims appearing in their books have been dubbed "myths" by the Discovery Channel television show MythBusters. One claim which had previously appeared in Ripley's books, concerning an "accidental" execution of 1,200 Turkish prisoners when something uttered by Napoleon Bonaparte was misunderstood, has had its accuracy challenged by Snopes.

Ripley's has reported the urban legend of Frank Tower – an individual who was supposed to have survived the sinkings of the RMS Titanic, RMS Empress of Ireland, and RMS Lusitania – as being factual, but this story has been debunked by several sources.

Ripley's has also repeated the Muhlenberg legend, which claims that German was once one vote short of becoming the official language of the United States.

Ripley's has mentioned a well-known myth that claims the Great Wall of China is visible from the Moon with the naked human eye.

== In popular culture ==
Warner Bros. Cartoons parodied the franchise in a 1939 Merrie Melodies cartoon Believe It or Else.

The 2013 video game Grand Theft Auto V features a business called Bishop's WTF on Vinewood Boulevard, based on the Ripley's located on Hollywood Boulevard. The name is a reference to the Alien franchise, specifically Ellen Ripley's ally Bishop.

In the 1999 movie The Iron Giant there is a scene where the film's protagonist Hogarth is in the woods pondering what to do with the giant robot. At which point, he says "So we can't call Ripley's Believe It or Not, because… they wouldn't believe it."

In Season 35, Episode 12 of Saturday Night Live, an SNL Digital Short called Laser Cats 5 was featured which parodies various James Cameron films, including Aliens. Sigourney Weaver makes an appearance in the short as her character Ellen Ripley and a throwaway line is used which references Ripley’s Believe It or Not!

In the 1955 novel The Talented Mr. Ripley by Patricia Highsmith, the title character refers to himself in chapter 18 as "believe-it-or-not Ripley."

== See also ==
- Strange as It Seems, a rival publication
- Museum of Jurassic Technology, an oddities museum
