= Scrambled eggs (disambiguation) =

Scrambled eggs is an egg dish.

Scrambled eggs may also refer to:

- Scrambled egg (uniform) - nickname for military visor insignia
- Scrambled Eggs (1939 film), a 1939 Walter Lantz cartoon
- Scrambled Eggs (1976 film), a 1976 French film
- Corydalis aurea, a plant commonly referred to as scrambled eggs
- "Scrambled Eggs" (Garfield and Friends), episode of Garfield and Friends from 1989
- "Scrambled Eggs" - the working title for the tune "Yesterday" by The Beatles
- Scrambled Eggs, a board game variant of Lines of Action
- Scrambled eggs, a game of Technōs Japan
- "Scrambled Eggs" (Hazbin Hotel), an episode of the first season of Hazbin Hotel
