= Ripley's Believe It or Not (1949 TV series) =

American TV series (1949–1950)

- Based on: Ripley's Believe It or Not!
- Written by: Ben Kagen; Bill Alley; Sam Cauter
- Directed by: Harry Herrmann; Richard Goode
- Presented by: Robert Ripley; Bugs Baer; Robert St. John
- Country of origin: United States
- Original language: English

Original release
- Network: NBC
- Release: March 1, 1949 – October 15, 1950

Related
- Ripley's Believe It or Not! television series

Ripley's Believe It or Not is an American television series that was broadcast on NBC from March 1, 1949, through October 5, 1950.

== Format ==
Ripley's Believe It or Not was an adaptation of the radio program Believe It or Not, which was broadcast in various iterations on four networks from April 14, 1930, through September 3, 1948. Episodes of the TV program initially featured dramatizations of content of Robert Ripley's syndicated Believe It or Not newspaper comic feature. Each early episode featured a live reenactment of an almost unbelievable incident along with films that Ripley took during his travels.

Ripley was the host until his death on May 27, 1949. Bugs Baer was the host on the May 31, 1949, episode. Robert St. John later became the permanent host. Ming and Ling, "The Chinese Hillbillies", appeared on episodes along with Peggy Corday and Fritz De Wilde. Guests on the program included Charles Velo, who set an endurance record of riding a bicycle for 85 hours and 12 minutes. The premiere episode featured Kuda Bux riding in a bicycle race while he was blinded by having "putty, lead foil, cotton, and yards of bandages" over his eyes. Highlights of other episodes included the story behind "Taps", the bugle call played at military funerals.

Beginning January 4, 1950, the format shifted to presentation of "mystery and horror yarns said to be based on authentic records". Episodes broadcast in the revised format included "Murder in Duplicate" (January 25, 1950) and "The Dead Will Speak" (September 12, 1950).

== Production ==
Douglas Storer was the packager. Producers included Richard Hurdle, Roger Muir, and Harry Herrmann. Directors included Herrmann and Richard Goode. Writers included Ben Kagen, Bill Alley, and Sam Cauter. Sponsors included Motorola and Ballantine Beer. The program originated from WNBT.

The program was initially broadcast on Tuesdays from 9:30 to 10 p.m. Eastern Time. It was moved to Wednesdays from 10 to 10:30 p.m. E. T. in July 1949, and it remained in that slot through September 1949. In October and November 1949 it appeared at various times. In January 1950 it was moved to Wednesdays from 8 to 8:30 p.m. E. T.; during May 1950 it was seen on Thursdays from 8 to 8:30 p.m. E. T. When it was canceled, it was replaced by The Peter Lind Hayes Show.

== Critical response ==
A review in the trade publication Variety said that in the premiere episode Ripley was "pretty wooden" and "plenty uncomfortable". It added that the episode had too many segments, which resulted in diminished treatment of each element. Some of Ripley's explanations, the review said, "were sketchy and incomplete". Overall, the review indicated that much needed to be done to improve the program.

A review of the January 25, 1950, episode in the trade publication Billboard complimented the acting, direction, and camera work, although it noted one "grisly bit which might well have been omitted by imaginative direction."

== Audience measurement experiment ==
The August 24, 1949, episode of Ripley's Believe It or Not was used by Schwerin Research Corporation and NBC as the first in a series of tests related to TV programs. The trade publication Variety reported, "the system is claimed to give prospective sponsors a method to test program ideas in advance and current sponsors a way of testing effectiveness of their shows and commercials." Prior to the episode's broadcast, 2,000 New York City residents who owned TV sets received ballots to be used in the survey. A "split-signal system" made small numbers on the screen visible only to viewers in New York City, so that the numbers on the screen would "cue viewers when to note their reactions". Another component of the project had 300 people in a studio viewing a kinescope of the program.
