= Ripley Entertainment =

American entertainment company

- Type: Subsidiary
- Founded: 1918; 108 years ago
- Founder: Robert Ripley
- Headquarters: Orlando, Florida
- Key people: Jim Pattison (CEO)
- Parent: Jim Pattison Group
- Divisions: Ripley Publishing
- Website: ripleyentertainment.com

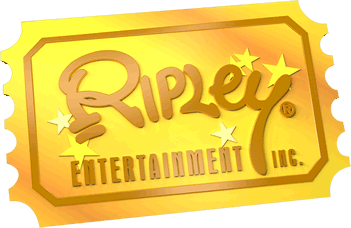
Old logo of Ripley Entertainment

Ripley Entertainment Inc. is an entertainment and edutainment holding company owned by the Jim Pattison Group of Vancouver, British Columbia, Canada. The company, headquartered in an unincorporated part of southern Orange County, Florida, was founded by cartoonist and amateur anthropologist Robert Ripley, the namesake of the company, in 1918.

The company primarily deals in amusement attractions, most notably the Ripley's Believe It or Not! museums, which feature various collections of oddities. They additionally own a publishing division, Ripley Publishing, which publishes the Ripley's Believe It or Not Annual alongside other books under the Ripley name.

== Properties ==
=== Current ===
Name	Location(s)	Year opened	Year acquired	Notes
Guinness World Records attractions				
Louis Tussaud's Waxworks	==== United States ==== : Newport, Oregon; Grand Prairie, Texas; San Antonio, Texas; ==== Other countries ==== : Cancún, Mexico; Niagara Falls, Canada; Pattaya, Thailand		2004 (Grand Prairie)	
Ripley's Aquarium	Toronto, Ontario; Myrtle Beach, South Carolina; Gatlinburg, Tennessee	October 16, 2013 (Toronto)		
Ripley's Believe it or Not! Odditoriums	==== Mexico ==== : Cancún; Guadalajara; Mexico City; Veracruz; ==== United States ==== : Los Angeles, California; San Francisco, California; Orlando, Florida; Panama City Beach, Florida; St. Augustine, Florida; Ocean City, Maryland; Branson, Missouri; Newport, Oregon; Myrtle Beach, South Carolina; Gatlinburg, Tennessee; Grand Prairie, Texas; San Antonio, Texas; Williamsburg, Virginia; Wisconsin Dells, Wisconsin; ==== Other countries ==== : Surfers Paradise, Australia; Cavendish, Prince Edward Island, Canada; Niagara Falls, Canada; Copenhagen, Denmark; Blackpool, England; Genting Highlands, Malaysia; Amsterdam, Netherlands; Pattaya, Thailand			
Ripley's Haunted Adventure	Myrtle Beach, South Carolina; Gatlinburg, Tennessee; San Antonio, Texas; Pattaya, Thailand	1999 (Gatlinburg); 2001 (Myrtle Beach); 2002 (San Antonio); 2004 (Pattaya)		
Ripley's Mini-Golf and Arcade	Gatlinburg, Tennessee			
Ripley's Moving Theater				
Ripley's Red Train Tours	St. Augustine, Florida			
Ripley's Mirror Maze	Orlando, Florida; Ocean City, Maryland; Myrtle Beach, South Carolina; Gatlinburg, Tennessee; San Antonio, Texas			
Ripley's Davy Crockett Mini-Golf	Gatlinburg, Tennessee			
Ripley's Old McDonald Mini-Golf	Sevierville, Tennessee			

=== Former ===
Name	Location(s)	Year opened/acquired	Year closed/sold	Notes
Ride the Ducks	Branson, Missouri	1970 (opened); 2017 (acquired)	2019	Permanently closed following the Table Rock Lake duck boat accident.
