= Ripley's Bureau of Investigation =

Children's book series

Ripley's Bureau of Investigation is a series of children's fiction books published by Ripley Publishing in the United States and distributed by Random House in the United Kingdom and Icewater Press in Australia. It consists of eight published books. Two later books in the series, Danger Underground and Haunted Hotel, remained unpublished until they appeared on the children's Pickatale reading app. The series was intended to have twelve books in total, but was discontinued.

The series follows seven extraordinary pupils at the fictional 'Ripley High' school, based on "Ripley's Believe it or Not!" founder Robert Ripley's real-life mansion on a private island in Long Island Sound on the East Coast of the United States. In the books Robert Ripley is represented by a supercomputer. The chosen pupils, each with unique powers and skills, form the Ripley's Bureau of Investigation, tasked with investigating unusual stories and facts around the world.

== Characters ==
=== D.U.L. Agents ===
The "Department of Unbelievable Lies" are mysterious villains in the RBI stories who work against the RBI agents.

=== RBI Agents and other characters ===
Agent	Age	Nationality	Powers
Alek Filipov	15	Russian	Gymnast, incredibly strong and flexible.
Kobe Shakur	15	Kenyan	Physical endurance and tracking skills, as well as telepathic abilities.
Kate Jones	14	English	Photographic memory and can learn languages in minutes.
Max Johnson	14	American	Technology genius, creates robots and hacks computers.
Li Yong	15	Chinese	Musical genius, expert hearing, can identify and imitate any sound.
Jack Stevens	14	Australian	Able to communicate with animals.
Zia Mendoza	13	Venezuelan	Ability to conduct high levels of electricity, may be able to influence the weather.

Other regular characters include the teachers Mr Cain and Dr Maxwell, who assist the RBI in their missions.

== Titles ==
Title	Subject	Agents Involved
Book 1 A Scaly Tale	Creature in the swamps of the Florida Everglades	Kobe, Jack, Zia
Book 2 The Dragon's Triangle	Reports of a dragon off the coast of Japan	Max, Alek, Zia
Book 3 Running Wild	Feral child in the mountains of China	Jack, Kate, Kobe
Book 4 Secrets of the Deep	Search for an underwater city in the Mediterranean	Kate, Li, Alek
Book 5 Wings of Fear	Unidentified flying object over London	Max, Jack, Li
Book 6 Sub-Zero Survival	Hunt for an artifact left by Robert Ripley in the ice of Antarctica	Alek, Kate, Max
Book 7 Shock Horror	Investigating mysterious blackouts and exploding trees in Canada	Zia, Li, Max
Book 8 Lost Island	Tracking down a furry two-trunked elephant and an island filled with unbelievable animals on an island in East Africa	Jack, Li, Kobe
Book 9 Danger Underground (unpublished, ebook)	Mysterious explosion at an isolated gas station in the Australian Outback	Zia, Alek, Jack, Kobe
Book 10 Haunted Hotel (unpublished, ebook)	Ghostly happenings at Castle Warden in Florida	Max, Kate, Li
