= The CooCoo Nut Grove =

1936 cartoon by Isadore Freleng

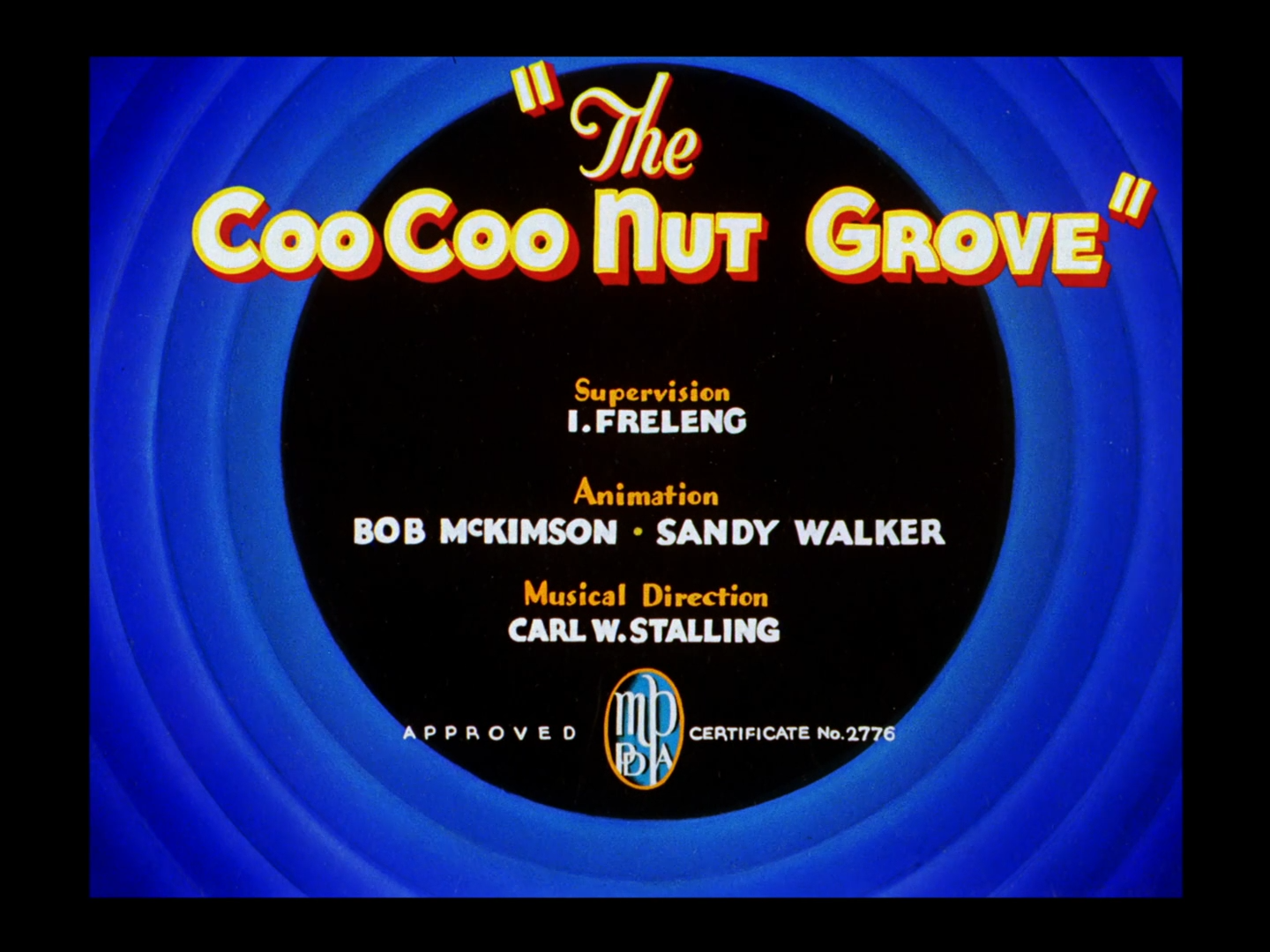
- Title card
- Directed by: Isadore Freleng
- Produced by: Leon Schlesinger
- Starring: Bernice Hansen; Tedd Pierce; The Rhythmettes; Verna Deane; Danny Webb; Peter Lind Hayes; Dave Barry
- Edited by: Treg Brown
- Music by: Carl W. Stalling
- Animation by: Bob McKimson; Sandy Walker
- Color process: Technicolor
- Production company: Leon Schlesinger Productions
- Distributed by: Warner Bros. Productions; The Vitaphone Corporation
- Release date: November 28, 1936
- Running time: 6 mins
- Country: United States
- Language: English

The CooCoo Nut Grove is a 1936 American animated comedy short film directed by Isadore Freleng. The short was released on November 28, 1936. It is the 67th film in the Merrie Melodies series.

== Plot ==
At the CooCoo Nut Grove nightclub – a parody of the Cocoanut Grove in the Ambassador Hotel in Los Angeles – we see Ralph Barton-esque caricatures of Hollywood celebrities, including Charles Laughton, Joe E. Brown, Bette Davis, Fred Astaire and Lionel Barrymore.

Master of ceremonies Ben Birdie, a caricature of Ben Bernie, is accosted by Walter Windpipe, a caricature of Walter Winchell; Birdie blows Windpipe out of the tuba from which he has emerged. Other caricatures are then shown, such as Hugh Herbert, W. C. Squeals (a caricature of W. C. Fields as a pig that previously appeared in At Your Service Madame) flirting with a caricature of Katharine Hepburn as a horse, Ned Sparks cursing his loneliness, and Lupe Vélez and her then-husband Johnny Weissmuller, dressed as Tarzan; Weissmuller does the Tarzan yell.

Meanwhile, John Barrymore "The Great Profile", walks to his table keeping his head positioned in order to display his perfect profile. Harpo Marx of the Marx Brothers chases a shrieking woman.

Birdie suggests the club members start dancing; all, depicted as birds, do so. Many of the male birds are wearing turtlenecks and smoking. A bird caricature of Mae West dances with a turtle caricature of George Arliss. Laurel and Hardy appearing as a pig (Hardy) and a monkey (Laurel), watch the dancing and share a coconut.

Greta Garbo and Clark Gable watch Edna May Oliver dancing to "The Lady in Red". Gable claps his large ears instead of his hands. Gary Cooper walks by, attracting criticism from three monkeys, who say he is "pixilated" (from Mr. Deeds Goes to Town).

The next to perform are the Dionne quintuplets, who sing "My Old Man". Vélez and Weissmuller applaud, only for Weissmuller to pass out from fright as a mouse runs by, causing an annoyed Vélez to do the Tarzan yell and swing away with him. The woman chased by Harpo Marx is revealed to be Groucho Marx, causing Harpo to run away.

A caricature of Helen Morgan sings "The Little Things You Used To Do" while crying on a piano. Wallace Beery is moved to tears, squeezing a banana like a tube onto a knife and consuming the fruit while continuing to shed tears. The camera shows Morgan crying again, before switching to Harpo wiping away his tears with a windshield wiper on his hat. Actors Edward G. Robinson and George Raft continue with their tough guy personas before giving up, bursting into sobs and embracing each other. The tears soon flood the nightclub as the tables float away, followed by turtle George Arliss rowing on his shell, Birdie bids the audience good night as the stage also floats away.

== Production ==
Cartoonist T. Hee was hired for this short after Frank Tashlin saw his caricatures appearing in the San Francisco Examiner (particularly his caricatures of Greta Garbo and Clark Gable). Hee was then heavily in demand by the animation studios and was engaged by Walt Disney Productions, where he worked on the classic Mother Goose Goes Hollywood.

== Home media ==
The short was released on disc 2 of the Looney Tunes Golden Collection: Volume 3 DVD set.
