= Norbert Pearlroth =

Polish-American researcher

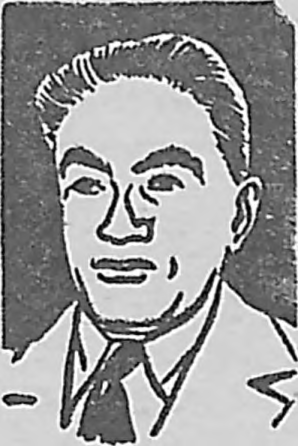
- Drawing of Pearlroth from The Jewish Post column
- Born: May 7, 1893; Tarnów, Poland
- Died: April 14, 1983 (aged 89); Brooklyn, New York
- Known for: Researcher for Ripley's Believe It or Not!

Norbert Pearlroth (May 7, 1893 – April 14, 1983) was a Polish-born American professional researcher and polyglot, and the primary researcher for the Ripley's Believe It or Not! cartoon panel from 1923 until 1975.

== Biography ==
Believe It or Not! for January 12, 1941

Pearlroth was born on May 7, 1893, in Tarnów, in what is now southern Poland, at the time part of the Habsburg Empire. He attended university in Kraków and was planning to become a lawyer, but the events of World War I took him away from his studies. He came to the United States in 1920. Working as a bank teller in New York City in 1923 he met Robert Ripley, who was in the process of expanding his syndicated Believe It or Not! newspaper panel from sports trivia to general interest and was looking for someone who could read foreign journals. Pearlroth was fluent in 14 languages, and an avid reader of foreign publications, and he had an unusual memory for miscellany. After his initial interview with Ripley, Pearlroth produced three features for Believe It or Not! and was eventually hired for $25 for an hour's work a week (equivalent to $470 in 2025).

As Ripley's sole researcher, he worked ten hours a day, six (sometimes seven) days a week at the Main Reading Room of the New York Public Library Main Branch. The library estimated that Pearlroth examined some 7,000 books every year. "Everyone has always believed that all of this information was found wandering the world," said Pearlroth's son, Arthur. "But it was really found on 42nd Street and Fifth Avenue at the Main Library."

Each morning, Pearlroth left his home in Brooklyn, where he lived with his wife, Susan, and two children, and took the subway into Manhattan. He worked at his office until noon, answering some of the 3000 letters that arrived each week from readers all over the world. "The readers always had some argument with me," he said, but claimed he was wrong only once—about a man named Seaborn who he said was born at sea. (He was actually born aboard a ship at anchor in a harbor.) He never ate lunch; at noon he headed to the library, where he worked through the afternoon and evening, taking half an hour for dinner, returning home when the library closed at 10 pm. He sometimes worked on Sundays if he fell behind in locating items. His deadline was on Friday, and he always worked several weeks in advance. This routine continued for 26 years, interrupted only when he accompanied Ripley on several of his exotic and highly publicized world journeys.

By the 1940s, Believe It or Not! had approximately 80 million readers worldwide. After Ripley's death on May 27, 1949, King Features Syndicate purchased the rights to the panel, and Pearlroth continued researching it for another 26 years, contributing exactly 24 items each week. He worked virtually without recognition for 52 years, although he is credited as "Research Director" in Ripley's Believe It or Not! 50th Anniversary Edition.

In addition to his work for Ripley's Believe It or Not!, Pearlroth also wrote a weekly column, "Your Name", for the Jewish Post of New York, answering reader inquiries about the origins of Jewish surnames. The newspaper claimed that his column received more mail than any other feature that the Jewish Post published, and that none of his interpretations of Jewish names had ever been refuted.

Although Pearlroth never missed a deadline, King Features replaced him in 1975. Even after his forced retirement, he continued to contribute items as a freelancer, despite receiving no pension nor any royalties from any of the popular Believe It or Not! books; though Ripley left Pearlroth a personal bequest of $5,000 (equivalent to $68,000 in 2025) and paid for his son's schooling.

He died on April 14, 1983, at Maimonides Hospital in Brooklyn, a few weeks shy of his 90th birthday.
