= Danny Webb (American actor) =

American voice actor

- Born: David Weberman; May 24, 1906; New York City, U.S.
- Died: September 16, 1983 (aged 77); New York City, U.S.
- Other name: Dave Weber
- Occupations: Actor, comedian
- Years active: 1935–1951

Danny Webb (born David Weberman May 24, 1906 — September 16, 1983), also known professionally as Dave Weber, was an American voice actor, vaudeville comic, and radio/TV comedian.

== Early life ==
Webb was born David Weberman on May 24, 1906, in New York City to Herman Weberman, a Hungarian Jewish furrier, and Lena (née Rubin) Weberman. Herman left Budapest and moved to the United States in 1887. He worked as a salesman.

== Voice actor ==
The young comedian arrived in Hollywood in 1935, using the professional name Dave Weber. He did celebrity impersonations on the Burns & Allen anniversary show along with doing voice work for a Screen Gems cartoon called Sing Time, where he impersonated Bing Crosby, Rudy Vallee, Eddie Cantor, Andy Devine, and others. He started working for Warner Bros. Cartoons in the mid-1930s and his first cartoon was The Coo-Coo Nut Grove. He also voiced Egghead in Daffy Duck & Egghead, Elmer Fudd in Cinderella Meets Fella (1938) and in Believe It or Else (1939). Weber also did voices for the 1939 Merrie Melodies short A Day at the Zoo.

Weber voiced the Disney character Goofy for four years, after Goofy's traditional voice Pinto Colvig had a falling out with Walt Disney and left the studio temporarily.

== Actor in Hollywood films ==
Dave Weber's comedic versatility was noticed by Columbia Pictures. In September 1938 Columbia signed him to star in 12 two-reel comedies. Columbia changed his professional name from Dave Weber to Danny Webb, and his first film was to be Behind the Eight Ball. The film was released as A Star Is Shorn (1939), directed by Mack Sennett veteran Del Lord, with Webb as a hot-shot talent agent. Webb's screen personality resembled that of 1950s star Bobby Van. Columnist Erskine Johnson reported, "When Jules White, the producer of the comedy shorts, saw Danny Webb on the screen for the first time, he said: 'That Danny Webb is terrific -- we'll ballyhoo him as another Eddie Buzzell.'" (Buzzell had appeared in Columbia shorts in the early 1930s before becoming a director.)

Danny Webb's short-subject series was abruptly called off, however, after the one film. Webb was transferred to Columbia's Community Sing series -- also directed by Del Lord that season -- where Webb made comic remarks between vocals by the King Sisters. While at Columbia he was scheduled to work with action star Jack Holt in Wreckage, (released as Flight into Nowhere), but Webb does not appear in the finished film.

Webb left Columbia for industrial-film producer Wilding Pictures, where he worked on promotional films for Chrysler automobiles, and then joined Warner Bros. as an actor.

== Return to voice work ==
Webb returned to Columbia to provide voices for its animated cartoons, and continued to work behind the scenes in Hollywood, offering his trick voices in feature films like Universal's Sing Another Chorus and Hellzapoppin' (both 1941). Also in 1941, after Mel Blanc signed a contract with Leon Schlesinger in which he exclusively did voice work for Warner Bros., Webb became the first person to succeed Blanc as the voice of Woody Woodpecker for Walter Lantz Productions. He only partially voiced the character in Pantry Panic, which also contained a few spoken lines Blanc had recorded prior to leaving the Lantz studio, before Webb enlisted in the army and was succeeded by Kent Rogers (sources claiming that Ben Hardaway was the first person to succeed Blanc as Woody's voice are incorrect, as Hardaway would not voice the character until The Barber of Seville in 1944).

Webb enlisted in the U.S. Army Signal Corps, worked his way up to staff sergeant, and entertained troops in North Africa. Dwight D. Eisenhower was sufficiently impressed by his technique to call him a "Comedy Commando", a tag which stuck for several years after World War II had ended. Webb later returned to radio, became the voice of Sad Sack, and hosted the quiz show "Guess Who" starting May 11, 1945, replacing Peter Donald.

== Television ==
Danny Webb joined local New York television station WPIX-TV in 1949 as a children's entertainer. He co-starred with Toby Sommers on Comics on Parade -- the "comics" referring not to comedians but to newspaper comics. "Uncle" Danny Webb and Toby Sommers would read comic strips on the air on this seven-days-a week, 15-minute program. Webb followed this with another limited-run kids' show, Small Time. During 1950 Webb was also "The Little Professor", commercial spokesman for Dr. Posner's Shoes, seen during broadcasts of WPIX's Six-Gun Playhouse. On December 9, 1950 Webb debuted as the emcee of a juvenile amateur show, Junior Talent Time.

Danny Webb and Toby Sommers were reteamed on April 21, 1951 in The Danny Webb Show, a Saturday-morning comedy series starring Webb as an Army private opposite Sommers as a USO hostess. The 15-minute programs were aired by WPIX until June 16, 1951.

Webb remained in television behind the scenes. In 1957 he joined NBC's Wide Wide World as an assistant producer, alongside producer-director Ed Pierce and unit manager Ed Faught. It turned out, as Variety reported, that all three were former vaudevillians who "worked the same bill together at the Metropolitan in Boston 15 years ago", where Webb was the emcee and comedian. Webb remained with NBC as an assistant producer (and later production supervisor) for other programs, like the network's annual broadcasts of the Macy's Thanksgiving Day Parade.

== Death ==
Danny Webb died on September 16, 1983, according to The New York Times; he was 77. He died of Parkinson's disease.

== Filmography ==
=== Film ===
Year	Title	Role	Notes
1936	The Coo-Coo Nut Grove	Walter Windpipe	Voice, uncredited
1937	Porky's Duck Hunt	Joe Penner	Voice, uncredited
1937	Clean Pastures	Various	Voice, uncredited
1937	Porky's Super Service		Voice, uncredited
1937	Egghead Rides Again	Egghead	Voice, uncredited
1937	Plenty of Money and You		Voice, uncredited
1937	September in the Rain	Various	Voice, uncredited
1938	Daffy Duck & Egghead	Egghead	Voice, uncredited
1938	Yokel Boy Makes Good	Snuffy Skunk	Voice, uncredited
1938	Poor Elmer		Voice, uncredited
1938	Boy Meets Dog	Typewriting Elf	Voice, uncredited
1938	The Big Birdcast	Joe Penner Bird	Voice, uncredited
1938	Katnip Kollege		Voice, uncredited
1938	Cinderella Meets Fella	Elmer Fudd	Voice, uncredited
1938	A-Lad-In Bagdad	Egghead	Voice, uncredited
1938	Pals of the Saddle	Russian Musician	as Dave Weber
1938	Porky in Wackyland		Voice, uncredited
1938	Porky in Egypt	Humpty Bumpty	Voice, uncredited
1938	You're an Education		Voice, uncredited
1938	Count Me Out	Egghead	Voice, uncredited
1938	The Disobedient Mouse		Voice, uncredited
1938	Mother Goose Goes Hollywood	Eddie Cantor, Charlie McCarthy, Joe Penner, Edward G. Robinson, Fats Waller, Stepin Fetchit	Voice, uncredited
1939	The Lone Stranger and Porky	Indian in Mirror	Voice, uncredited
1939	It's an Ill Wind	Mysterious Voice	Voice, uncredited
1939	Jitterbug Follies	Tough Guy	Voice, uncredited
1939	A Day at the Zoo	Second Elk, Owl, Parrot, Second Panther, Jailbird	Voice, uncredited
1939	Porky's Movie Mystery	Police Chief	Voice, uncredited
1939	Goofy and Wilbur	Goofy	Voice, uncredited
1939	Chicken Jitters	Fox	Voice, uncredited
1939	The House That Jack Built	Bear, Boss Termite	Voice, uncredited
1939	A Star Is Shorn	Speedy Williams	Starring role in two-reel comedy
1939	Bars and Stripes Forever	Prison Guard, Other Prisoners	Voice, uncredited
1939	Thugs with Dirty Mugs	Killer Diller	Voice, uncredited
1939	Songs of Romance (Community Sing No. 10)	Himself	Master of ceremonies in King Sisters musical
1939	Believe It or Else	Elmer Fudd, Old Man in Jail, Chippofoski	Voice, uncredited
1939	Snuffy's Party	Mr. Whippletree	Voice, uncredited
1939	Life Begins for Andy Panda	Mr. Whippletree, Finchell Broadcasting Station, Pygmies	Voice, uncredited
1939	Naughty Neighbors	Duck	Voice, uncredited
1939	Pied Piper Porky	Mouse	Voice, uncredited
1939	Fresh Fish	Fish Teacher	Voice, uncredited
1939	Scrambled Eggs	Various	Voice, uncredited
1939	Laugh It Off	Indian Wahoon in Production Number	Uncredited
1940	Porky's Last Stand	Various	Voice, uncredited
1940	Andy Panda Goes Fishing	Mr. Whippletree, Pygmies	Voice, uncredited
1940	The Mouse Exterminator	Krazy Kat	Voice, uncredited
1940	Slap-Happy Pappy	Andy Devine Chicken, Ned Sparks Chicken, Walter Winchell Bird	Voice, uncredited
1940	100 Pygmies and Andy Panda	Mr. Whippletree, Pygmies	Voice, uncredited
1940	Tugboat Mickey	Goofy	Voice, uncredited
1940	Billposters	Goofy	Voice, uncredited
1940	Barnyard Babies	Various	Voice, uncredited
1940	News Oddities	Various	Voice, uncredited
1940	Tangled Television	Various	Voice, uncredited
1940	Mr. Elephant Goes to Town	Various	Voice, uncredited
1940	It Happened to Crusoe	Various	Voice, uncredited
1940	Malibu Beach Party	Ned Sparks, Most Male Actors	Voice, uncredited
1940	Crazy House	Mysterious Voice	Voice, uncredited
1940	Goofy's Glider	Goofy	Voice, uncredited
1941	City of Missing Girls	William Short	
1941	Baggage Buster	Goofy	Voice, uncredited
1941	Woody Woodpecker	Owl	Voice, uncredited
1941	Boogie Woogie Bugle Boy of Company "B"	Drill Sergeant	Voice, uncredited
1941	Sing Another Chorus	Imitator	Uncredited
1941	Pantry Panic	Woody Woodpecker, Korny Kat, Moose	Voice, uncredited; shared the role with Mel Blanc and Kent Rogers.
1941	Hellzapoppin'	"Calling all devils" bass voice	Voice, uncredited
1942	Old Blackout Joe	Air Raid Warden	Voice, uncredited
1952	Magical Maestro	Blackface singer, bass voice	Voice, uncredited

=== Radio ===
Year	Title	Role	Notes
1936	The Baker's Broadcast	Himself	Episode: "The Old Joe"
