= Porky's Movie Mystery =

1939 film by Robert Clampett

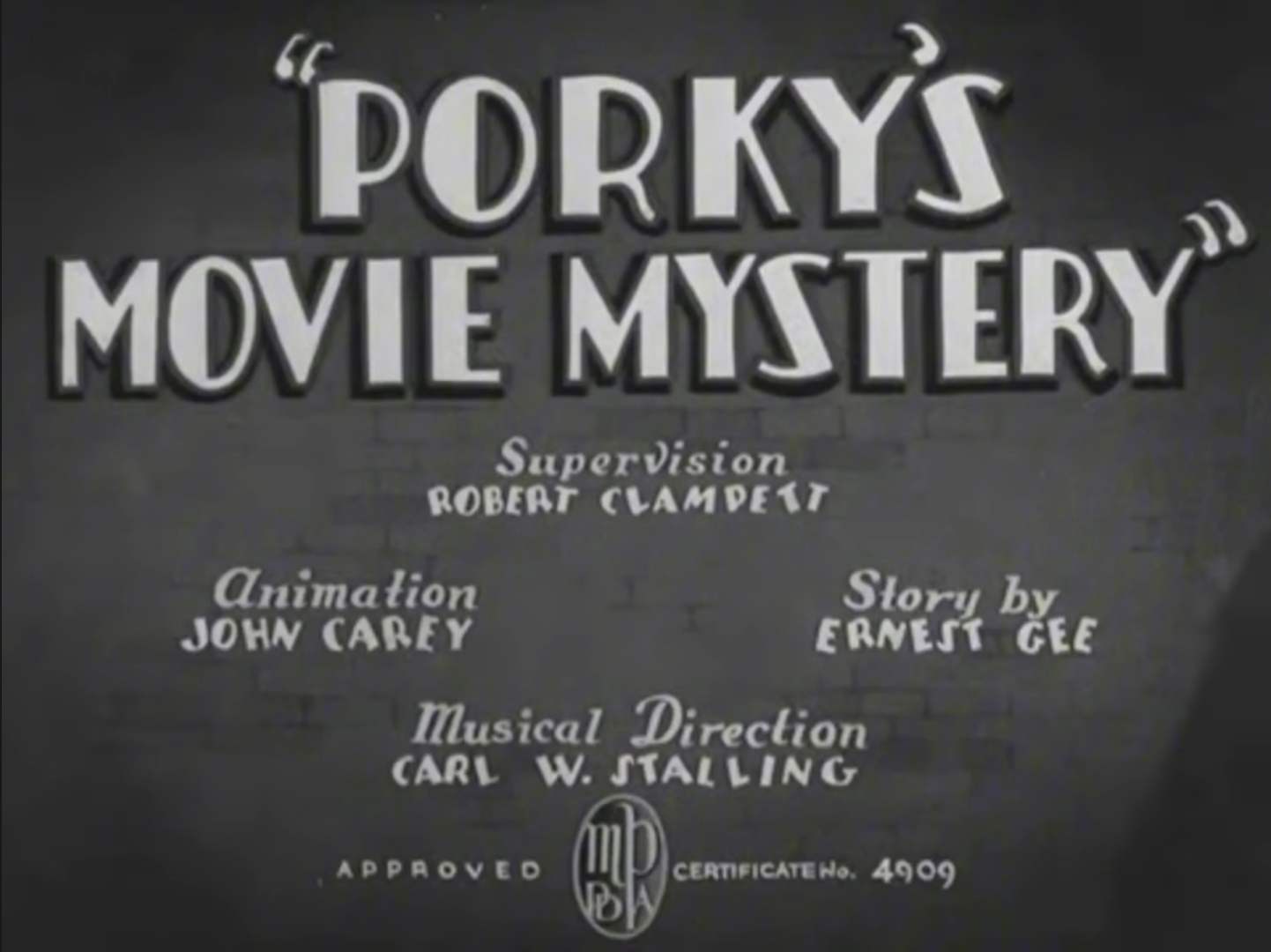
- Title card
- Directed by: Robert Clampett
- Story by: Ernest Gee
- Produced by: Leon Schlesinger
- Starring: Mel Blanc; Sara Berner; Billy Bletcher; Danny Webb
- Music by: Carl W. Stalling
- Animation by: John Carey
- Color process: Black-and-white
- Production company: Leon Schlesinger Productions
- Distributed by: Warner Bros. Pictures; The Vitaphone Corporation
- Release date: March 11, 1939 (USA)
- Running time: 7 min
- Country: United States
- Language: English

Porky's Movie Mystery is a 1939 American animated comedy short film directed by Robert Clampett. The short was released on March 11, 1939. It is part of the Looney Tunes series and the 54th cartoon to feature Porky Pig. It is a parody of the Mr. Moto series; due to its stereotypical depiction of Asians, it is rarely shown on television or released on home media.

== Plot ==
A radio news report from Walter Windshield (a spoof of Walter Winchell) says that a mysterious phantom has been haunting Hollywood for weeks, ruining pictures and frightening stars. At Warmer Bros Studios, the phantom is on his rampage. Studio cops look all around the lot for the phantom. They even question famous movie monsters like Frankenstein, who bites his fingernails as a cop grills him with questions. Later, the phantom climbs a spiral staircase all the way to the ceiling, then slides back down the pole to the top floor. He sneaks into The Invisible Man's dressing room and reveals himself to be The Invisible Man himself who dons a cape purely for spectacle. He reveals his intentions to be retaliation for being fired after starring in his own film, due to his invisibility dooming his career. The public and the police call upon Mr. Motto (Porky Pig) to stop him. Unfortunately, Mr. Motto is currently on vacation. The police chief doesn't care if Mr. Motto is on vacation and demands that they summon him.

Mr. Motto is on a tiny island reading a book about Ju Jitsu. He suddenly receives a phone call and answers the coconut. After being informed, the tiny island is revealed to be a speedboat which crashes onto a bridge, sending Mr. Motto into his plane where he flies to Hollywood. He crash lands in the chief's office and greets the chief with a throw down. Mr. Motto apologizes and goes to work at once.

While Mr. Motto searches for the phantom, The Invisible Man phantom spots him, takes off his black attire and blends into a poster showing an actress named Lotta Dimples in a film called Great Guns. Mr. Motto came by, continues his search, and gets kicked by The Invisible Man. The Invisible Man then grabs an ax and attempts to kill Mr. Motto. The Invisible Man corners Mr. Motto at a wall but before he could finish him off, Mr. Motto read his book again, grabs the ax and attacks the phantom. Mr. Motto even puts the ax down. Mr. Motto punches the phantom, throws him around and finishes him off. Then as the reporter reports on what's about to happen, Mr. Motto grabs his anti-invisible juice and sprays it all over the phantom. The Invisible Man is revealed to be Hugh Herbert.

== Home media ==
- LaserDisc - Guffaw and Order: Looney Tunes Fight Crime
- DVD - Porky Pig 101

== See also ==
- Porky Pig filmography
- Looney Tunes and Merrie Melodies filmography (1930–1939)
