= Ripley's Haunted Adventure =

Haunted houses by Ridley Entertainment

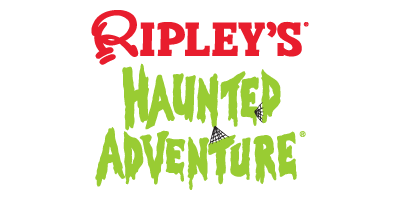
Brand logo

Ripley's Haunted Adventure is a tourist attraction brand owned by Ripley Entertainment, known for its Ripley's Believe It or Not! franchise and located along commercial strips and mostly in resort cities. All but one location is in the United States (one in Thailand).

The attraction is based on tradition of haunted houses with animation and live actors. The first haunted house opened in Gatlinburg in 1999.

== Locations ==
The Haunted Adventure attractions are located within or near existing Ripley properties:

- Gatlinburg, Tennessee - opened in 1999 and located next to Ripley's 5D Moving Theater on Parkway (US-441S) and short drive from within Ripley Aquarium (c. 1997)
- Myrtle Beach, South Carolina - opened in 2001 located along with Ripley Moving Theater and Aquarium on N Ocean Boulevard across from the beach front Plyler Park
- San Antonio, Texas - opened on March 22, 2002, next to Ripley Museum and Madame Tussaud's Waxworks on North Alamo Street and across from The Alamo in the Downtown area.
- Pattaya, Thailand - opened on October 30, 2004, within Ripley Museum on the second floor of the Royal Garden Plaza shopping complex (c. 1993) on Pattaya 1 or Beach Road with in the resort city.
