= Billposters =

1940 Donald Duck and Goofy cartoon

- Theatrical poster
- Directed by: Clyde Geronimi
- Produced by: Walt Disney
- Starring: Clarence Nash; Danny Webb
- Color process: Technicolor
- Production company: Walt Disney Productions
- Distributed by: RKO Radio Pictures
- Release date: May 17, 1940 (US)
- Running time: 8 minutes
- Country: United States
- Language: English

Billposters is a 1940 Donald Duck and Goofy cartoon. It was the third Donald & Goofy cartoon produced. This was the first cartoon to feature the 1940-1946 Donald Duck theme music in the opening titles.

== Plot ==
Donald and Goofy have been hired to display posters, or bills, for a no name soup company. While entering, they both gleefully sing "Whistle While You Work" from the then recently released Snow White and the Seven Dwarfs. Goofy attempts, unsuccessfully, to paste his bills onto a nearby windmill, while Donald battles with a local farmyard goat, who's intent on eating everything it can. The battle ensues into a chase between Donald and the goat, ultimately concluding with the goat headbutting Donald and Goofy perpetually around the windmill blades.

== Voice cast ==
- Clarence Nash as Donald Duck
- Danny Webb as Goofy

== Home media ==
The short film was released on May 18, 2004, on Walt Disney Treasures: The Chronological Donald, Volume One: 1934-1941.
