= Ripley Publishing =

American publisher

- Parent company: Jim Pattison Group
- Status: Active
- Founded: 2008
- Founder: Ripley Entertainment
- Country of origin: United States
- Headquarters location: Orlando, Florida
- Distribution: Simon & Schuster (US)
- Publication types: Books
- Nonfiction topics: Family reference, children's fiction
- Official website: www.ripleybooks.com

Ripley Publishing is a publisher based in Orlando, Florida, United States. The company was set up in 2008 by Ripley Entertainment (owned by the Jim Pattison Group), owner of the Ripley's Believe It or Not! brand of museums, cartoons, television shows and books. The company publishes the New York Times bestselling Ripley's Believe It or Not! Annual and a range of other Believe It or Not! titles.

== Selected titles ==
- Ripley's Believe It or Not Annual
- Ripley's RBI children's fiction series
- Ripley's Twists reference series
- Scholastic Special Edition
