= Ripley's Believe It or Not! (Vitaphone shorts) =

The title card for the Vitaphone shorts.

Ripley's Believe It or Not! is a series of black and white theatrical short sound films produced by Warner Bros. with Vitaphone from 1930 to 1932. Each short is hosted by Robert Ripley, creator and founder of the franchise of the same name. These shorts were usually shown in Ripley's Museums. The shorts were then sold to United Artists, who in turn sold to Metro-Goldwyn-Mayer, who in turn sold these shorts to Ted Turner under Turner Entertainment, and ran these shorts on Turner Classic Movies. In addition, the rights were given back to Warner Bros. in 1996 after their merger with Turner Entertainment.

== Episodes ==
The titles of the series were all numbered accordingly:

  - No. 1 / Vitaphone No. 1005, released May 4, 1930
  - No. 2 / Vitaphone No. 1038, June 11, 1930
  - No. 3 / Vitaphone No. 1053, August 31, 1930 (Film Daily review date)
  - No. 4 / Vitaphone No. 1067, released September 5, 1930
  - No. 5 / Vitaphone No. 1093, released September 12, 1930
  - No. 6 / Vitaphone No. 1109, November 5, 1930
  - No. 7 / Vitaphone No. 1148, January 5, 1931 (features Medal of Honor recipient Daniel R. Edwards)
  - No. 8 / Vitaphone No. 1172, February 20, 1931
  - No. 9 / Vitaphone No. 1189, released May 2, 1931
  - No. 10 / Vitaphone No. 1197, released July 5, 1931
  - No. 11 / Vitaphone No. 1211, released July 12, 1931
  - No. 12 / Vitaphone No. 1267, released September 1931 (with extensive travelogue footage of Egypt)
  - No. 2-1 / Vitaphone No. 1282, released November 5, 1931 (focuses on Algeria, Egypt, and Morocco)
  - No. 2-2 / Vitaphone No. 1294, released December 3, 1931
  - No. 2-3 / Vitaphone No. 1304, released December 1931
  - No. 2-4 / Vitaphone No. 1320, released January 2, 1932 (features child actor Billy Hayes visiting "Believe It or Not Land")
  - No. 2-5 / Vitaphone No. 1336, released March 20, 1932
  - No. 2-6 / Vitaphone No. 1346, released March 13, 1932
  - No. 2-7 / Vitaphone No. 1361
  - No. 2-8 / Vitaphone No. 1362
  - No. 2-9 / Vitaphone No. 1363, April 23, 1932
  - No. 2-10 / Vitaphone No. 1364, April 23, 1932
  - No. 2-11 / Vitaphone No. 1412, released June 1932
  - No. 2-12 / Vitaphone No. 1427, July 1932

== Home media ==
A 2-DVD release featuring 24 of these theatrical shorts is available in the United States beginning March 16, 2010, from Warner Home Video, through their Warner Archive manufacture-on-demand program. Directors on the shorts included Murray Roth (on the first five), Roy Mack and Alfred J. Goulding (latter half of second season). Leo Donnelly assisted later in the commentary.
