= Woody Woodpecker (1941 film) =

1941 film by Walter Lantz

- Title card
- Directed by: Walter Lantz (unc.)
- Story by: Ben Hardaway; Jack Cosgriff
- Produced by: Walter Lantz
- Starring: Mel Blanc; Margaret Hill-Talbot; Danny Webb; Ben Hardaway (all unc.)
- Music by: Darrell Calker
- Animation by: Alex Lovy; Ray Fahringer; Les Kline (unc.); Laverne Harding (unc.)
- Backgrounds by: Ed Kiechle (unc.)
- Color process: Technicolor
- Production company: Walter Lantz Productions
- Distributed by: Universal Pictures
- Release date: July 7, 1941
- Running time: 6:55
- Country: United States
- Language: English

Woody Woodpecker is the first animated cartoon short subject in the Woody Woodpecker series. Released theatrically on July 7, 1941, the film was produced by Walter Lantz Productions and distributed by Universal Pictures.

This is the second appearance of Woody Woodpecker; his debut was in an Andy Panda cartoon, Knock Knock.

The working title of this cartoon is 'Cracked Nut'. This title would later be used on a 1960s theatrical rerelease and in reruns on The Woody Woodpecker Show.

== Plot ==
The inhabitants of the forest that Woody Woodpecker lives in have started spreading the word that Woody is crazy, due to all of his screwball antics. After telling him (and many others) this several times, Woody also begins to question his sanity. Woody Woodpecker spends his day singing loudly and pecking holes in trees. He infuriates the other woodland creatures, when he is not baffling them with his bizarre behavior. Woody overhears a squirrel and a group of birds gossiping about him. Even though he just sang a song proclaiming his craziness, he denies their whispered accusations that he is nuts. After they trick him into knocking his head on a statue, the poor bird hears voices in his head and decides the animals might be right. He decides to see a doctor, but Woody chooses to see Dr. Horace N. Buggy, a Scottish-brogue-burring fox who is even crazier than he is. The story ends with Woody hurled into a movie theater audience, watching the doctor crack up on screen, and annoying the people beside him ("That doctor sure is a card, isn't he? But I don't think he's near as funny as the woodpecker! Do you think so, mister? Huh? DO you, mister? HUH? I like cartoons! Don't YOU like cartoons??"). One of the people then puts up Woody's seat, leaving him stuck. Then, he screams for help from his seat. As for the people beside him, they smile gladly as the cartoon ends.

== Notes ==
There is no director credit for the film. Lantz himself has claimed to have directed Woody Woodpecker.
