= Pantry Panic =

1941 film by Walter Lantz

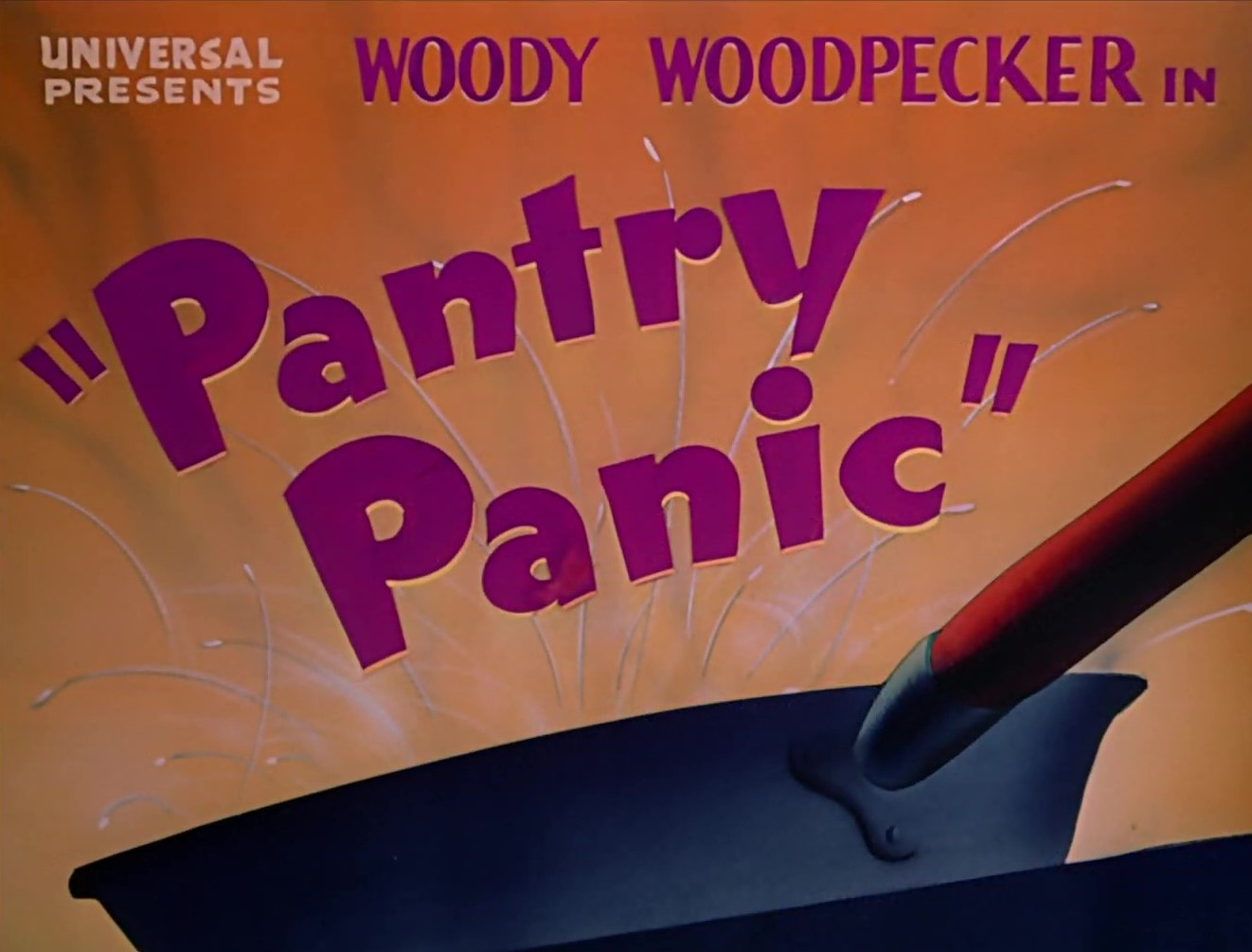
- Title card
- Directed by: Walter Lantz
- Story by: Ben Hardaway; L.E. Elliott
- Produced by: Walter Lantz
- Starring: Danny Webb; Mel Blanc; Marge Tarlton; Margaret McKay; Kent Rogers
- Music by: Darrell Calker
- Animation by: Alex Lovy; Lester Kline; Laverne Harding; Frank Tipper; Hal Mason
- Backgrounds by: Ed Kiechle
- Color process: Technicolor
- Production company: Walter Lantz Productions
- Distributed by: Universal Pictures
- Release date: November 24, 1941
- Running time: 7:03
- Country: United States
- Language: English

Pantry Panic is the third animated cartoon short in the Woody Woodpecker series. Released theatrically on November 24, 1941, the film was produced by Walter Lantz Productions and distributed by Universal Pictures. This short is one of the few cartoons where Woody does not say "Guess Who?" in the opening titles, although his trademark laugh in the cartoon itself is still present.

== Plot ==
The full short

The local groundhog warns a community of birds that a winter storm is imminent; the birds all quickly head south before it arrives, except Woody, who wants to continue swimming. Winter suddenly arrives, freezing the swimming hole solid while Woody is mid-dive ("must be hard water"); Woody is initially unfazed, as he has stockpiled much food to wait the winter out—until a funnel cloud breaks down Woody's door and sucks away all of his food.

Two weeks later, Woody is literally staring starvation, personified as something vaguely resembling the Grim Reaper, in the face. A month later, a hungry cat happens upon Woody's cabin (aware of the viewers reading one of the title cards and its description of said "hungry little kitty cat"), and conspires to eat the woodpecker, who likewise seeks to eat the cat. A battle ensues. Eventually, a moose appears at Woody's open door, and the starving cat and woodpecker chase after it to capture and eat it. Afterwards, however, the meal proves not to be enough to satisfy Woody or the cat, who instantly resume their game of trying to eat each other.

== Voice cast ==
- Danny Webb as Woody Woodpecker (some lines), Korny Kat, and Moose
  - Mel Blanc as Woody Woodpecker (some lines and trademark laugh)
  - Kent Rogers as Woody Woodpecker (one line), Birds
- Margaret McKay as Birds
- Marjorie Tarlton as Birds

== Production notes ==
Like most of early 1940s Lantz cartoons, Pantry Panic carried no director's credit. Lantz himself has claimed to have directed this cartoon.

Pantry Panic was the third cartoon in the Woody Woodpecker series, featuring an early, garish Woody Woodpecker design. It was the only short with Danny Webb as Woody's voice, and also the last short to feature Mel Blanc since the latter had recorded some of Woody's dialogue for this short before he got an exclusive contract to do voice work for cartoons solely for Leon Schlesinger Productions, so Webb was hired to fill in for Blanc to complete Woody's remaining dialogue. Blanc's recording of the woodpecker's trademark laugh, however, would continue to be recycled until 1951, when Grace Stafford rerecorded a softer version, while Woody's "Guess Who?", also provided by Blanc, would continue to be used in the opening titles until the end of the series and permanent closure of the Lantz studio in 1972.

Pantry Panic was reworked in 1946 as Who's Cookin' Who?. The starvation personification would also reappear in the remake as well as 1951's The Redwood Sap. Due to copyright neglect, this entry is currently the only Woody Woodpecker cartoon in the public domain as of 2026. As such, it is freely distributed, and can be downloaded from the Internet Archive and seen on YouTube.
