= Ripley's Believe It or Not Special Edition =

Ripley's Believe It or Not! Special Edition is a hardback non-fiction book published annually from 2001 to 2017, branded as the following year. The book is aimed at young readers and presents weird stories and photographs in a similar format to the larger, more mature Ripley’s Believe It or Not! Annual. The book is produced by Ripley Publishing in the United Kingdom for Scholastic USA.

Origin

The first Ripley’s special edition was published by Scholastic in 2001. The last was published on August 29, 2017.

Edition List

Ripley’s Believe It Or Not Special Edition. Published September 2001. On the cover: Many, including the Lighthouse Man of Chongqing, and a frog with a dumbbell.

Ripley’s Believe It Or Not Special Edition 2004. Published September 2003. On the cover: Many, including The Lizardman, a dog with dentures, and Liew Thow Lin.

Ripley’s Believe It Or Not Special Edition 2005. Published September 2004. On the cover: Many, including Tom Leppard and an alien with a TV remote.

Ripley’s Believe It Or Not Special Edition 2006. Published September 2005. On the cover: Many, including The Lizardman and a two headed cat.

Ripley’s Believe It Or Not Special Edition 2007. Published September 2006. On the cover, many, including Elaine Davidson and a dog with golf balls in its mouth.

Ripley’s believe it or not Special Edition 2008. Published September 2007. On the cover: Marco Hort, a Swiss performer with around 400 straws in his mouth.
