= Paul Frehm =

Comic strip cartoonist

Paul Frehm (1904–1986) was a cartoonist who worked on the comic strip Ripley's Believe It or Not. He received the National Cartoonist Society Newspaper Panel Cartoon Award for his work on the strip in 1976.
