= Scrambled Eggs (1939 film) =

- Title card
- Directed by: Alex Lovy
- Story by: Elaine Pogany
- Produced by: Walter Lantz
- Starring: Marjorie Tarlton; Sara Berner; Danny Webb; Victor McLeod
- Music by: Frank Marsales
- Animation by: Hicks Lokey; Frank Tipper; Willy Pogany
- Backgrounds by: Ed Kiechle
- Color process: Technicolor
- Production company: Walter Lantz Productions
- Distributed by: Universal Pictures
- Release date: November 20, 1939
- Running time: 10 minutes
- Country: United States
- Language: English

Scrambled Eggs is a cartoon produced by Walter Lantz Productions in 1939 by Universal Pictures featuring a mischievous satyr-like creature named Peterkin.

== Plot ==
It is dawn in the woods. Mother and Father Swan, with their little cygnets, coast across a pond. The Night Watchman of the forest, Mr. Owl, awakens. He looks down at the sleeping Peterkin, a young boy faun, waking up, and wonders what mischief he will get into today. The mother birds are all preparing for the arrival of their babies, knitting clothes for them, while the father birds pace back and forth on a branch. Peterkin, seeing a croaking frog, picks up his flute and starts to play it loudly. The birds in their nests up above tell him to be quiet. Dr. Fred Allen Stork, using a candle to reveal a baby bird playing tic-tac-toe, announces that the eggs will hatch in an hour, and while the father birds celebrate with cigars (one of which explodes in Mr. Finch's face, after which Mr. Finch angrily chirps at Mr. Parrot), the mother birds boast about their own babies (i.e., their eggs). Peterkin, annoyed by "All that bragging", decides to get back at them.

He sneaks up the massive "Maternity Tree", and covertly switches all the eggs in all the nests. Soon, the eggs hatch - each bird couple has a baby bird of a type different from themselves: for example, the English sparrows hatch a mockingbird, who quickly begins "mocking" the sparrow father by speaking in an English accent, the canaries hatch a parrot who speaks like a pirate, and the tiny finches hatch a huge blackbird who speaks African-American Vernacular English, all the while Peterkin laughs to himself about the mischief and confusion. The father birds look suspiciously at their wives, and walk off to "live at the club", while the mother birds are "going home to mother". Peterkin is about to play his flute again, but this mass desertion by all the parent birds leaves the baby birds hungry, and crying for food and attention.

Peterkin is the only one left to take care of them, a task he gamely tries, but one for which he finds he is totally unsuited. Worn out, an exhausted Peterkin goes to the club, where the father birds are moping, sighing, missing their wives, and confesses his shenanigans to the father birds, hoping they will take over their parental duties. Mr. Blackbird, the father birds, and Mr. Owl, however, growing suspicious at his confession, are outraged and furious, and chase after a retreating Peterkin in order to catch and punish him. In the end, all the families are restored to normal, and Peterkin is sentenced to laundry duty. Although Peterkin promises not to do any such mischief ever again, he winks at the camera and says that he will find something mischievous to do next time, revealing that he had his fingers crossed before the cartoon ends.

== Cast ==
- Marjorie Tarlton as Peterkin, Mrs. Canary, Baby Voices (uncredited)
- Sara Berner as Mrs. Woodpecker, Mrs. Parrot, Mrs. Sparrow, Baby Mockingbird (uncredited)
- Victor McLeod as Owl (uncredited)
- Danny Webb as Fred Allen Stork, English Sparrow, Blackbird, Baby Bird Yelling (uncredited)

== Production ==
Scrambled Eggs was production #984 for Walter Lantz Productions, the fourth in the Cartune Classics series.

The story is by Elaine Pogany, with designs and backgrounds by her husband Willy Pogany, both of whom are given prominent credit. There were no other Peterkin cartoons produced by Walter Lantz, although the character was featured the following year in a children's book called Peterkin, created together by the Poganys, with Elaine doing the story and Willy doing the artwork.

This cartoon was one of the first done in color by Lantz. It can be found on The Woody Woodpecker and Friends Classic Cartoon Collection DVD box set.
