= Robert Ripley =

American cartoonist (1890–1949)

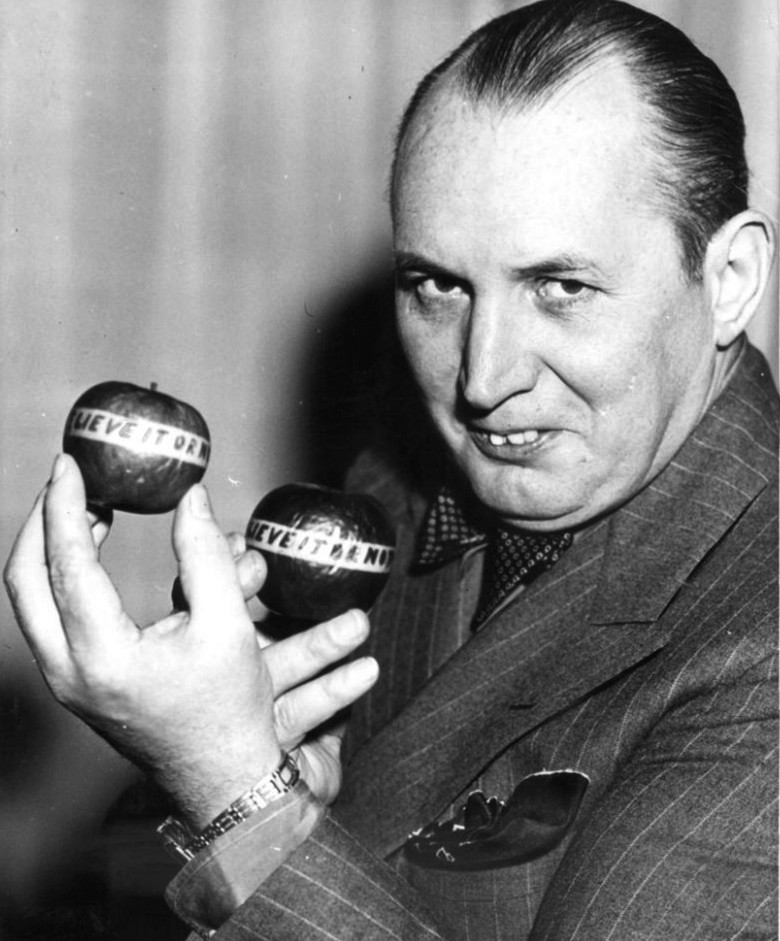
- Ripley in 1940
- Born: February 22, 1890; Santa Rosa, California, U.S.
- Died: May 27, 1949 (aged 59); New York City, U.S.
- Resting place: Santa Rosa Odd Fellows Cemetery, Santa Rosa, California, U.S.
- Occupations: Cartoonist; entrepreneur; curator; anthropologist
- Years active: 1920s–1949
- Known for: Creator of Ripley's Believe It or Not!
- Board member of: Ripley Entertainment
- Spouse: Beatrice Roberts (m. 1919; div. 1923)

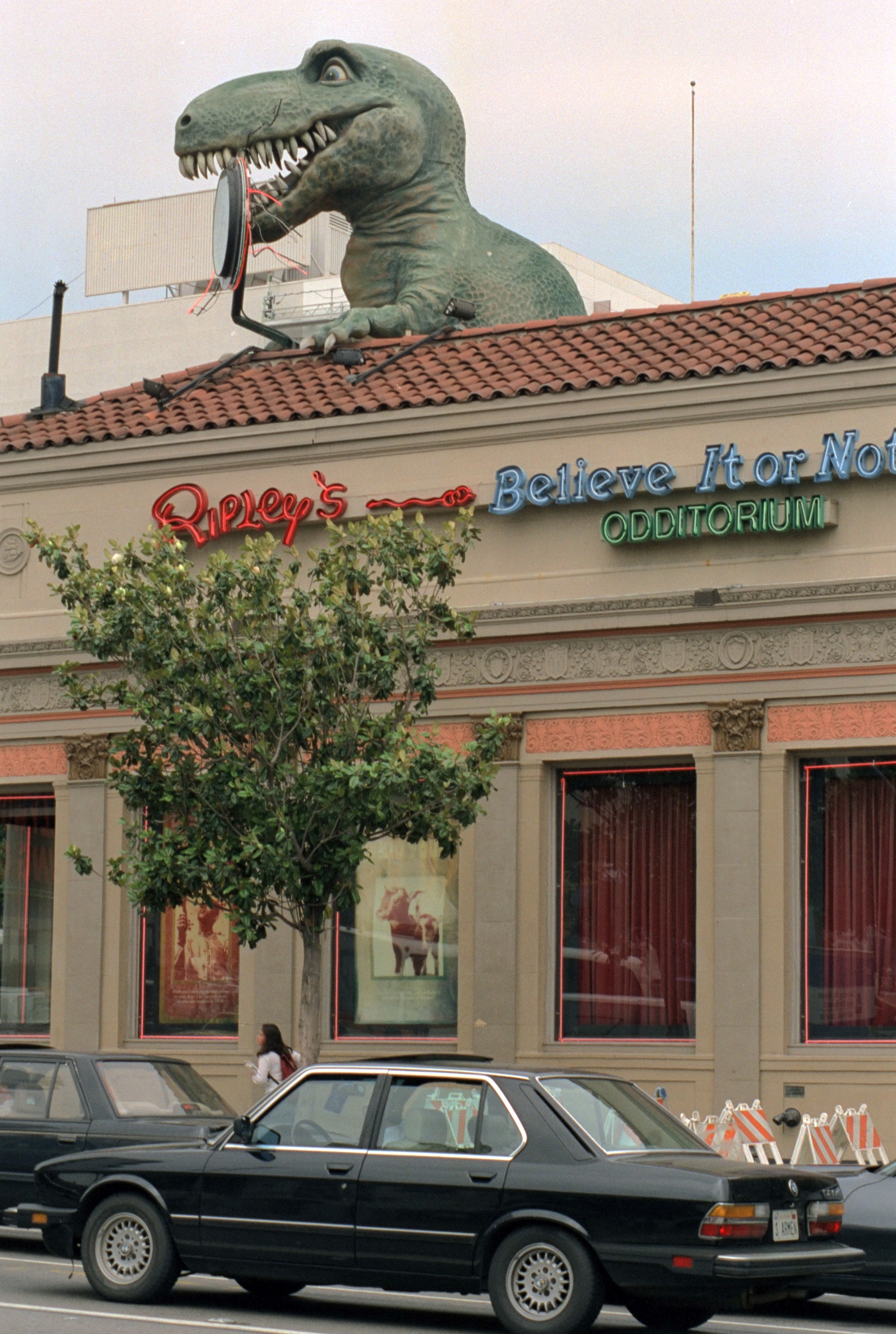
Ripley's Odditorium in Hollywood

LeRoy Robert Ripley (February 22, 1890 – May 27, 1949) was an American cartoonist, entrepreneur, and amateur anthropologist, who is known for creating the Ripley's Believe It or Not! newspaper panel series, television show, and radio show, which feature odd facts from around the world.

Subjects covered in Ripley's cartoons and text ranged from sports feats to little-known facts about unusual and exotic sites. He also included items submitted by readers, who supplied photographs of a wide variety of small-town American trivia ranging from unusually shaped vegetables to oddly marked domestic animals, all documented by photographs and then depicted by his drawings.

== Biography ==
LeRoy Robert Ripley was born on February 22, 1890, in Santa Rosa, California, although his exact birthdate is disputed. He dropped out of high school after his father's death to help his family, and at age 16, he began working as a sports cartoonist for various newspapers. In 1913, he moved to New York City. He moved to New York and dropped the name LeRoy for Robert. While drawing cartoons for The New York Globe newspaper, he created his first "Believe It or Not!" cartoon, published in the December 19, 1918, issue. With a positive response from readers, the cartoon began appearing weekly.

In 1919, Ripley married 18-year-old model and Follies dancer Beatrice Roberts, originally of Medford, Massachusetts. They separated a few years later before the divorce was finalized in 1923. He made his first trip around the world in 1922, publishing his travel journal in the newspapers. He became fascinated with unusual and exotic foreign locales and cultures. Because he took the veracity of his claims quite seriously, in 1923, he hired a researcher and polyglot named Norbert Pearlroth as a full-time assistant. In 1926, Ripley's cartoons moved from the New York Globe to the New York Post.

Throughout the 1920s, Ripley continued to broaden the scope of his work and his popularity increased greatly. He published a guide to the game of American handball in 1925. In 1926, he became the New York State handball champion and also wrote a book on boxing. With a proven track record as a versatile writer and artist, he attracted the attention of publishing mogul William Randolph Hearst, who managed the King Features Syndicate. In 1929, Hearst was responsible for Believe It or Not! making its syndicated debut in 360 newspapers and 17 languages worldwide. With the success of this series assured, Ripley capitalized on his fame by getting the first book collection of his newspaper panel series published.

On November 3, 1929, he drew a panel in his syndicated cartoon saying "Believe It or Not, America has no national anthem." Despite the widespread belief that "The Star-Spangled Banner", with its lyrics by Francis Scott Key set to the music of the English drinking song "To Anacreon in Heaven", was the United States national anthem, Congress had never officially made it so. In 1931, John Philip Sousa published his opinion in favor of giving the song official status, stating, "it is the spirit of the music that inspires" as much as it is Key's "soul-stirring" words. By a law signed on March 3, 1931, by President Herbert Hoover, "The Star-Spangled Banner" was adopted as the national anthem of the United States.

Ripley prospered during the Great Depression, netting $500,000 a year by the end of the 1930s. He employed a large staff of researchers, artists, translators, and secretaries to handle a deluge of suggestions for new oddities to report – and he traveled the world in search of curiosities and expanded his media to include radio and Hollywood. He started building museums in major cities. Funding for Ripley's highly publicized global travels were provided by the Hearst organization. Always in search of the bizarre, he recorded live radio shows underwater and from the sky, the Carlsbad Caverns, the bottom of the Grand Canyon, snake pits, and other exotic locales. The next year, he hosted the first of a series of two dozen Believe It or Not! theatrical short films for Warner Bros. and Vitaphone, and King Features published a second collected volume of Believe it or Not! panels. He also appeared in a Vitaphone musical short, Seasons Greetings (1931), with Ruth Etting, Joe Penner, Ted Husing, Thelma White, Ray Collins, and others. After a trip to Asia in 1932, he opened his first museum, the Odditorium, in Chicago in 1933. The concept was a success, and at one point, Odditoriums were in San Diego, Dallas, Cleveland, San Francisco, and New York City. By this point in his life, Ripley had been voted the most popular man in America by The New York Times, and Dartmouth College awarded him an honorary degree.

World travel became impossible during World War II, so Ripley concentrated on charity pursuit. In 1948, the year of the 20th anniversary of the Believe it or Not! cartoon series, the Believe it or Not! radio show drew to a close and was replaced with a Believe it or Not! television series. This was a rather bold move on Ripley's part, because of the small number of Americans with access to television at this early time in the medium's development. He completed only 13 episodes of the series before he became incapacitated by severe health problems. On May 27, 1949, at age 59, he died from a heart attack in New York City. He was buried in his home town of Santa Rosa in the Santa Rosa Odd Fellows Cemetery, which is adjacent to the Santa Rosa Rural Cemetery.

== The comic strip ==
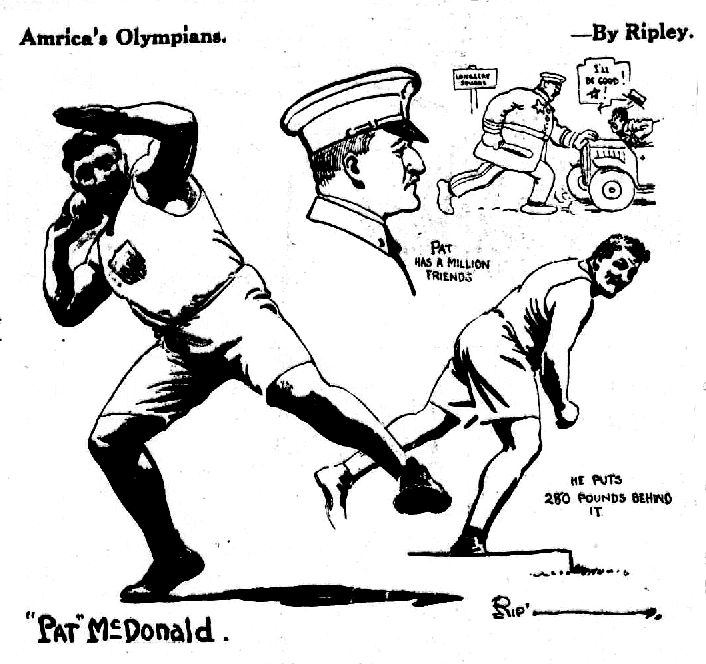
Early cartoon by Ripley, pre-"Believe It or Not," published in 1920. Pat McDonald, American Olympian.

Ripley's cartoon series was estimated to have 80 million readers worldwide, and he is said to have received more mail than the President of the United States. He became a wealthy man, with homes in New York and Florida, but he always retained close ties to his home town of Santa Rosa, California, and he made a point of bringing attention to the Church of One Tree, a church built entirely from the wood of a single 300-ft (91.4-m)-tall redwood tree, which stands on the north side of Juilliard Park in downtown Santa Rosa.

Ripley claimed to be able to "prove every statement he made" because he worked with professional fact researcher Norbert Pearlroth, who assembled Believe it or Not!'s array of odd facts and also verified the small-town claims submitted by readers. Pearlroth spent 52 years as the feature's researcher, finding and verifying unusual facts for Ripley, and after Ripley's death, for the King Features syndicate editors who took over management of the Believe it or Not! panel. Another employee who edited the newspaper cartoon series over the years was Lester Byck. Others who drew the series after Ripley's death include Don Wimmer, Joe Campbell (1946–1956), Art Slogg, Clem Gretter (1941–1949), Carl Dorese, Bob Clarke (1943–1944), Stan Randall, Paul Frehm (1938–1975), who became the panel's full-time artist in 1949, and his brother Walter Frehm (1948–1989).

== Legacy ==
Ripley's ideas and legacy live on in Ripley Entertainment, a company bearing his name and owned since 1985 by the Jim Pattison Group, a privately held company based in Canada. Ripley Entertainment airs national television shows, features publications of oddities, and has holdings in a variety of public attractions, including Ripley's Aquarium, Ripley's Believe it or Not! Museums, Ripley's Haunted Adventure, Ripley's Mini-Golf and Arcade, Ripley's Moving Theater, Ripley's Sightseeing Trains, Guinness World Records Attractions, and Louis Tussaud's Wax Museums.
