= Ripley's Believe It or Not Annual =

Hardback reference book

Ripley's Believe It or Not! Annual is a hardback reference book of unusual stories and images. The books consist of hundreds of snippets and longer in-depth articles, illustrated with glossy photographs. Twelve books have been produced since 2005 and they are published worldwide by Ripley Publishing. The Ripley's annual has featured on the New York Times bestseller list on multiple occasions.

== Published annuals ==
- Ripley’s Believe It or Not! (2005) ISBN 978-1-893951-73-0
- Planet Eccentric (2006) ISBN 978-1-893951-10-5
- Expect the Unexpected (2007) ISBN 978-1-893951-12-9
- The Remarkable Revealed (2008) ISBN 978-1-893951-22-8
- Prepare to be Shocked (2009) ISBN 978-1-893951-31-0
- Seeing is Believing (2010) ISBN 978-1-893951-45-7
- Enter If You Dare! (2011) ISBN 978-1-893951-63-1
- Strikingly True (2012) ISBN 978-1-60991-000-6
- Download the Weird (2013) ISBN 978-1-60991-032-7
- Dare to Look! (2014) ISBN 978-1-60991-077-8
- Reality Shock! (2015) ISBN 978-1-60991-109-6
- Eye-popping Oddities (2016) ISBN 978-1-84794-752-9
- Unlock the Weird (2017) ISBN 978-1-60991-165-2
- Shatter Your Senses! (2018) ISBN 978-1-60991-178-2
- A Century of Strange (UK title: A Whirlwind of Weird) (2019) ISBN 978-1-84794-833-5
- Beyond the Bizarre (UK title: All Weird! All True) (2020) ISBN 978-1-60991-242-0
- Mind Blown (2021) ISBN 978-1-60991-339-7
- Out of the Box (UK title: All True! All Weird! All Wild!) (2022) ISBN 978-1-60991-480-6
- Escape the Ordinary (2023)
- Level Up! (UK title: All True! Weird! New!) (2024)
- Dare to Discover (UK title: Spark Your Curiosity) (2025)
- Seek the Strange (2026)

In the US, the year is not included on the cover of the book. In the UK, it is.

== Upcoming annuals ==
1. Wired into Weird (2027)

== Notable individuals featured ==
- Chayne Hultgren: "The Space Cowboy"
- Brian Dettmer
- Herbert Nitsch
- Ueli Gegenschatz
- Khagendra Thapa Magar
- Erik Sprague
