= List of World War II short films =

Below is a list of short films or animated cartoons that pertain to World War II, or the years leading up to it.

== Restrictions ==
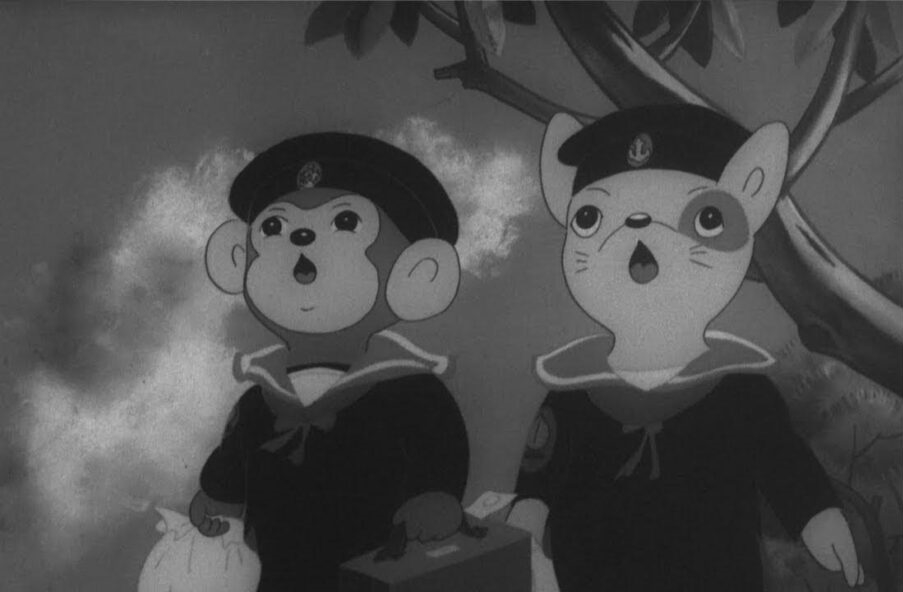
Momotarō's Sea Eagles (1943)

- The film must be concerned with Hitler's rise, the Spanish Civil War, the Sino-Japanese War, or World War II itself.
- Feature-length live-action films are excluded.
- For documentaries, see: List of World War II documentary films.

== Films made before the war ==
=== 1930s ===
Year	Country	Title	Director	Events depicted	View online
1938	United States	Ferdinand the Bull	Dick Rickard (uncredited)	Pacifist Disney cartoon.	YouTube
1938	United States	Porky the Gob	Ben Hardaway, Cal Dalton	Pro-preparedness cartoon where Porky Pig's battleship engages a "pirate submarine".	YouTube
1938	United States	What Price Porky	Robert Clampett	Pro-preparedness cartoon where farmer Porky Pig must mobilize his chickens against a heavily armed "ducktator" (Daffy Duck).	YouTube
1938	Japan	Sora no Arawashi or The Eagles of the Sky	Noburō Ōfuji	Japanese animal pilots shoot at images of Popeye and Joseph Stalin in the clouds.	Lost
1939	United States	Peaceful Neighbors	Sid Marcus	Pacifist cartoon.	YouTube

=== Year undetermined ===
Country	Title	Director	Events depicted	View online
United Kingdom	Local Boy Makes Good: A Story With a Moral	?	Cartoon in which an RAF bomber is able to shoot down German fighters once the pilot and turret gunner put on their respirators.	YouTube

== Films made during the war ==
=== 1939 ===
Country	Title	Director	Events depicted	IMDb BCDB	View online
United Kingdom	Hitler Dances to Stalin's Tune	Anson Dyer	Cartoon mocking the Soviet–Nazi pact, the friendship between Stalin and Hitler.		ITN; YouTube
United States	Peace on Earth	Hugh Harman	Anti-war cartoon.		YouTube

=== 1940 ===
Country	Title	Director	Events depicted	IMDb BCDB	View online
United States	Boobs in Arms	Jules White	Comedy with the Three Stooges in an unspecified army.		YouTube; IA
United Kingdom	Channel Incident	Anthony Asquith	Dramatic film about a yachtsman at Dunkirk.		
Nazi Germany	Der Störenfried	Hans Held	Cartoon in which a fox threatens a family of hares only to be strafed in turn by wasps of the Luftwaffe.		YouTube
Fascist Italy	Inghilterra contro Europa	Luigi Liberio Pensuti	Anti-British cartoon.		Archivio Luce
Fascist Italy	Il principio della fine	Luigi Liberio Pensuti	Anti-British cartoon.		Archivio Luce
Nazi Germany	Vom Bäumlein, das andere Blätter hat gewollt Das güldene Bäumchen	Heinz Tischmeyer	Anti-Semitic cartoon where a Jew plucks all the leaves from a golden tree, leaving it empty.		YouTube
United States	You Nazty Spy!	Jules White	Comedy with the Three Stooges.		YouTube; IA

=== 1941 ===
Country	Title	Director	Events depicted	IMDb BCDB	View online
Soviet Union	Fascist Boots Shall Not Trample Our Motherland (Не тoптать фашистскому сапогу Нашей Родины)	A. Ivanov, I. Vano	Anti-Nazi cartoon with German pig soldier vs. Soviet cavalry and tanks. Music by Prokofiev from Alexander Nevsky (1938).		YouTube
United States	I'll Never Heil Again	Jules White	Comedy with the Three Stooges; sequel to You Nazty Spy! (1940).		YouTube; IA
Soviet Union	A Journal of Political Satire № 2 (Журнал политсатиры № 2)	Zinaida Brumberg, Alexander Ivanov, Valentina Brumberg, Olga Khodatayeva, Ivan Ivanov-Vano	Anti-Nazi cartoon, in 4 parts, exhorting Soviets to resist "Fascist pirates" (Бей фашистских пиратов).		YouTube
United States	Meet John Doughboy	Robert Clampett	Cartoon feature with Porky Pig, announced as "Draftee 158 3/4", presenting a war-themed "spot gag" newsreel titled "America's Defense Effort".		IA
United States	The Mighty Navy	Dave Fleischer	Cartoon about Popeye joining the Navy to fight against 'The Enemy'.		YouTube
United States	The Rookie Bear	Rudolf Ising	Cartoon feature Barney Bear drafted into the Army during his hibernation.		IA
United States	Rookie Revue	Friz Freleng	Cartoon which shows the different elements of the US Army: infantry, cavalry, armour, USAAF, artillery, and lampoons (accurately) makeshift weaponry.		YouTube
United Kingdom	Rush Hour	Anthony Asquith	Comedy film asking casual travellers to leave transport to workers.		
Canada; United States	7 Wise Dwarfs	Dick Lyford & Ford Beebe	Cartoon, animated for the NFB by Disney, in which the Seven Dwarfs invest their gems in Canadian War Savings Certificates.		YouTube
Canada; United States	The Thrifty Pig	Walt Disney (producer)	Cartoon, animated for the NFB by Disney, in which the Big Bad Nazi Wolf is defeated by a house flying Canada's national flag and built of Canadian War Savings Certificates.		IA
Canada	V for Victory	Norman McLaren	Cartoon in support of a war bond drive. Music by John Philip Sousa.		
United States	The Flying Bear	Rudolf Ising; Bob Allen	MGM Cartoon featured Barney Bear as an Air Force mechanic during WWII.		IA
Soviet Union	The Vultures (Стервятники)	Panteleimon Sazonov (uncredited)	Anti-Nazi cartoon where German vultures become bombers only to be shot out of the skies by Red Air Force fighters.		YouTube

=== 1942 ===
Country	Title	Director	Events depicted	View online	
United States	Ace in the Hole	Alex Lovy	A Woody Woodpecker cartoon that centers around Woody's shenanigans at a military air force.	YouTube; IA	
United States	All Out for "V"	Mannie Davis	A Terrytoons cartoon in which Forest animals give their all for war defense.	YouTube	
Canada; United States	All Together	Walt Disney (producer)	Cartoon, animated for the NFB by Disney, in which Pinocchio, Donald Duck, Pluto, Mickey Mouse, Goofy and the Seven Dwarfs parade at Centre Block for Canadian War Savings Certificates.	IA	
United States	Air Raid Warden	Alex Lovy	Cartoon featuring Andy Panda.		
United States	Andy Panda's Victory Garden aka Springtime for Andy	Alex Lovy	Cartoon in which Andy Panda's attempts to grow a victory garden are spoiled by a hungry rooster.	YouTube	
United States	Any Bonds Today?	Bob Clampett	War bond drive advertisement featuring Bugs Bunny performing in blackface for the war effort. The title song is by Irving Berlin.	YouTube	
United States	Barney Bear's Victory Garden	Rudolf Ising	MGM Cartoon featured Barney Bear planning his own victory garden during the days of World War II.	IA	
United States	Blitz Wolf	Tex Avery	Anti-Nazi cartoon featuring the three little pigs and the big bad wolf.	YouTube; IA	
United States	Blunder Below	Dave Fleischer	Cartoon featuring Popeye, depicting him defeating a Japanese submarine.	IA	
Soviet Union	Cinema Circus (Кино-цирк)	Olga Khodatayeva & Leonid Amalrik	Anti-Nazi cartoon featuring Hitler with his trained dogs, Mussolini, Horthy and Antonescu, and his mentor Napoleon, at a circus hosted by clown Karandash.	YouTube	
Fascist Italy	Il Dottor Churkill	Luigi Liberio Pensuti	Anti-British cartoon involving a Jekyll and Hyde story where Mr. Hyde becomes Dr. Jekyll (Winston Churchill).		YouTube
United States	The Devil with Hitler	Gordon Douglas	Comedy film where the Devil's job in Hell is threatened by Hitler.	YouTube	
United States	Donald Gets Drafted	Jack King (uncredited)	Disney cartoon in which Donald Fauntleroy Duck volunteers for the US Army.	YouTube	
Canada; United States	Donald's Decision	Walt Disney (producer)	Cartoon, animated for the NFB by Disney, in which Donald Duck's conscience makes him invest in Canadian War Savings Certificates.	IA	
United States	The Draft Horse	Chuck Jones	Cartoon in which a farm horse wants to enlist to help the war effort.	IA	
United States	The Ducktators	Norman McCabe	Anti-Axis cartoon which portrays Hitler, Mussolini and Tōjō as barnyard fowl.	IA	
United States	Eleventh Hour	Dan Gordon	Anti-Japanese cartoon portraying Superman as a saboteur at the Yokohama Navy Yard in Japan.	IA	
Canada	Empty Rooms Mean Idle Machines	Philip Ragan	Cartoon which encourages citizens to rent their spare room to a munitions plant labourer.	NFB	
United States	Fleets of Stren'th	Dave Fleischer	Cartoon featuring Popeye, fighting against a fleet of enemy planes.	IA	
United States	Food Will Win the War	Walt Disney (producer)	Morale-boosting cartoon to educate about the importance of American agriculture in the war effort and also to offset fears and panic of Americans who thought too many supplies were being sent overseas.	IA	
Canada	Hen Hop	Norman McLaren	Low-key cartoon in which a chicken dancing to "Turkey in the Straw" encourages Canadians to "save" for "V" (Victory).	YouTube; NFB	
United States	Japoteurs	Seymour Kneitel	Anti-Japanese cartoon featuring Superman and a group of Japanese spies trying to hijack a bomber.	IA; YouTube	
United Kingdom	Kill or Be Killed	Len Lye	Dramatic film of a confrontation between a Tommy and a German sniper.	YouTube	
United States	The New Spirit	Walt Disney (producer)	Anti-Axis Disney cartoon in which Donald Duck learns to pay his taxes and fight the Axis, using only a "tax blank", pen, ink, and a blotter.	IA; YouTube	
United States	Old Blackout Joe	Paul Sommer John Hubley	A Phantasy cartoon that satirizes blackout drills.	YouTube	
United States	Out of the Frying Pan into the Firing Line	Walt Disney (producer)	Cartoon in which Minnie Mouse and Pluto learn the uses of food fat and grease for war material production.	IA	
United States	Safeguarding Military Information	Preston Sturges	Dramatic film.	IA	
United Kingdom	Schichlegruber - Doing the Lambeth Walk	Charles A. Ridley (uncredited)	Short comedy film featuring clips from Triumph of the Will edited in such a way so as to make it appear that Hitler and other Nazis are dancing to The Lambeth Walk (a dance craze popular at the time but despised by the Nazis). This film was supplied uncredited to newsreel companies that gave the film other titles such as Lambeth Walk - Nazi Style, Gen. Adolf Takes Over, Germany Calling, Hitler Doing the Lambeth Walk, Hoch der Lambeth Valk: A Laugh-Time Interlude and Panzer Ballet. The newsreel companies world also supply their own narration	IA; YouTube	
United States	Scrap the Japs	Seymour Kneitel	Cartoon featuring Popeye, battling against Japanese planes and naval ships.	YouTube	
United States	Sky Trooper	Jack King	Disney cartoon in which Pvt. Donald Duck becomes a reluctant paratrooper.	YouTube	
United States	Song of Victory	Bob Wickersham Frank Tashlin (supervision)	A Color Rhapsody cartoon that portrays the Axis dictators as animals terrorizing a forest populated by small woodland creatures.	YouTube	
Canada; United States	Stop That Tank!	Ub Iwerks (uncredited) Walt Disney (producer)	Instructional cartoon, animated for the DND and NFB by Disney, showing Canadian Tommies using the Boys ATR against German armour, sending Hitler straight to Hell.	YouTube (part 1); YouTube (part 2); IA	
United States	Tulips Shall Grow	George Pal	Anti-Nazi Puppetoon where a Dutch windmill is attacked by the Screwballs.	IA	
Canada	Unmanned Machines Mean Unarmed Men	Philip Ragan	Cartoon which stresses the need for defense workers to be always on the job, not idle.	NFB	
United States	The Vanishing Private	Jack King	Disney cartoon in which Pvt. Donald Duck has trouble with camouflage paint.	YouTube	
United States	The Wacky Wabbit	Bob Clampett	Bugs Bunny cartoon with him heckling Elmer Fudd who's prospecting for gold in the American desert to help the war effort (with a sign advertising buying Defense bonds).	IA	
United States	Wolf Chases Pigs	Bob Wickersham Frank Tashlin (supervision)	A Colombia Fable which, similar to MGM's Blitz Wolf, puts The Three Little Pigs in a wartime setting.	YouTube	
United States	Yankee Doodle Swing Shift	Alex Lovy	A Swing Symphony cartoon that centers around a swing band working in a defense plant.	YouTube	
United States	You're a Sap, Mr. Jap	Dan Gordon	Anti-Japanese cartoon featuring Popeye, depicting him fighting a Japanese navy ship.	YouTube	

=== 1943 ===
Country	Title	Director	Events depicted	View online
United States	An Itch in Time	Bob Clampett	A hungry flea tries to make a snack out of Elmer Fudd's dog, ending the cartoon celebrating that "Meatless Tuesdays" are over.	IA
United States	Back From the Front	Jules White	A comedy with The Three Stooges turning the tables on Nazis on the S.S. Schicklgruber	YouTube; IA
United Kingdom	Bury the Axis	Lou Bunin		YouTube
United States	Canine Commandos	Alex Lovy	Cartoon featuring Andy Panda.	IA
United States	Chicken Little	Clyde Geronimi (uncredited)	Disney cartoon in which the fox employs modern propaganda techniques to seize control of the farmyard.	YouTube
United States	Coal Black and de Sebben Dwarfs	Bob Clampett	Patriotic cartoon featuring an all-Negro jazz retelling of Snow White, where the dwarfs are US soldiers.	YouTube; IA
United States	Confusions of a Nutzy Spy	Norman McCabe	Cartoon featuring policeman Porky Pig searching for a Nazi spy. The title parodies Confessions of a Nazi Spy.	YouTube; IA
United States	Daffy – The Commando	Friz Freleng	Anti-Nazi cartoon featuring Daffy Duck on a mission to Berlin against Hitler.	YouTube; IA
United States	Der Fuehrer's Face	Jack Kinney	Anti-Axis Disney cartoon in which Donald Duck imagines life working in a German munitions plant.	YouTube
United States	Dizzy Pilots	Jules White	Comedy with the Three Stooges.	IA
United States	Donald's Tire Trouble	Dick Lundy	Disney cartoon featuring Donald Duck.	YouTube
United States	Education for Death: The Making of the Nazi	Clyde Geronimi	Anti-Nazi Disney cartoon illustrating the indoctrination of a young boy into Nazism.	IA; YouTube
United States	Fall Out Fall In	Jack King	Animated cartoon featuring Donald Duck as an army private marching with the soldiers.	YouTube
United States	Falling Hare	Robert Clampett	Cartoon in which Bugs Bunny is heckled by a gremlin.	YouTube; IA
United States	The Fifth-Column Mouse	Friz Freleng	Cartoon in which mice resist feline oppression and prepare for war.	YouTube; IA
United States	Freedom Comes High	Lewis Allen	Dramatic film.	IA
United States	He Can't Make It Stick	Paul Sommer John Hubley	Color Rhapsody cartoon that satirizes Hitlers rise of power in Germany, the latter of which is symbolized as a widow with 3 children. Half of the cartoon visuals remains lost.	
United States	Home Defense	Jack King	Disney cartoon featured Donald Duck and his three nephews serving as civilian aircraft spotters during World War II.	YouTube
United States	Hop and Go	Norman McCabe	Cartoon features WWII-related content near the end of the film.	YouTube
United States	A Jolly Good Furlough	Dan Gordon	Cartoon where Popeye's nephews practice their home defense techniques on Popeye.	IA
United States	Jungle Drums	Dan Gordon	Cartoon in which Superman destroys a Nazi outpost using a giant jungle idol as a base to control the natives.	IA
United States	Meatless Tuesday	James Culhane	Cartoon in which Andy Panda tries to prepare a roast chicken meal for Meatless Tuesday, but the rooster he intends using won't cooperate.	YouTube
Imperial Japan	Momotarō's Sea Eagles (桃太郎の海鷲)	Mitsuyo Seo	Feature-length anti-Allied cartoon.	YouTube
United States	Nazty Nuisance aka The Last Three	Glenn Tryon	Comedy film with Hitler and his cronies in the tropics.	IA
United Kingdom	The New Lot	Carol Reed	Dramatic film in which five civilians are conscripted.	
United States	The Old Army Game	Jack King	Disney cartoon in which Pvt. Donald Duck goes AWOL.	YouTube
United States	Pass The Biscuits Mirandy!	James Culhane (uncredited)	A Swing Symphony cartoon that depicts the feuding Foy and Barton families eventually working together in a WWII battlefield.	IA
United States	Ration Bored	Emery Hawkins; Milt Schaffer	A Woody Woodpecker cartoon that satirizes rationing in the home front.	IA
United States	Ration Fer the Duration	Seymour Kneitel	Cartoon featuring Popeye and his victory garden.	IA
United States	Recognition of the Japanese Zero Fighter	Bernard Vorhaus	Part-animated dramatic film detailing differences between a Zero and a P-40.	IA
United States	Scrap Happy Daffy	Frank Tashlin	Cartoon where Daffy Duck's efforts to salvage scrap are spoiled by Hitler's metal-eating goat.	YouTube; IA
United States	Secret Agent	Seymour Kneitel	Cartoon where Superman battles Nazi saboteurs.	IA; YouTube
United States	Seein' Red, White 'n' Blue	Dan Gordon	Anti-Axis cartoon where draft board Popeye plummels some tiny Tojos, Hirohito, then Hitler, making Göring cry.	YouTube
United Kingdom	The Silent Village	Humphrey Jennings	Dramatic film in which the Nazi massacre at Lidice in Czechoslovakia is recreated in a Welsh village.	YouTube
United States	Spinach Fer Britain	Izzy Sparber	Cartoon featuring Popeye delivering spinach to Great Britain while avoiding a Nazi submarine.	YouTube
United States	The Spirit of '43	Jack King	Disney cartoon.	YouTube
United States	Take Heed Mr. Tojo	James Culhane (uncredited)	Anti-Japanese cartoon.	IA
United States	They Stooge to Conga	Del Lord	Comedy with the Three Stooges.	IA
United States	Tokio Jokio	Cpl. Norman McCabe	Anti-Japanese cartoon.	YouTube; IA
Occupied Netherlands	Van den vos Reynaerde	Egbert van Putten	Anti-Semitic cartoon based on Van den vos Reynaerde, an anti-Semitic children's story, which was in turn based on the legend of Reynard the Fox.	YouTube (fragments with seemingly pro-Nazi commentary)
United States	Victory Vehicles	Jack Kinney	Disney cartoon where Goofy develops solutions to the home front transportation crisis.	YouTube
United States	War Dogs	William Hanna & Joseph Barbera	This cartoon follows the life of a dim-witted dog going through military training.	YouTube
United States	What's Buzzin' Buzzard	Tex Avery	This cartoon follows two starving vultures first trying to catch a rabbit, then trying to eat each other; when they finally catch the rabbit, he reminds them that today is "Meatless Tuesday".	IA
Bohemia and Moravia	Wedding in the Coral Sea (Hochzeit im Korallenmeer)	Horst von Möllendorff (credited)	Cartoon where the wedding of two fish can only occur once a Russian pirate octopus is defeated.	YouTube
United States	The Yankee Doodle Mouse	William Hanna & Joseph Barbera	Cartoon of Tom and Jerry's cellar battle during World War II in which where Jerry's various tactics include deploying a brassiere parachute when his egg carton plane is shot down.	IA
United States	You, John Jones!	Mervyn LeRoy	Dramatic film about an air raid warden.	IA

=== 1944 ===
Country	Title	Director	Events depicted	View online
United Kingdom	Aventure malgache	Alfred Hitchcock	Anti-Vichy film (in French) about resistance to the Vichy takeover in Madagascar.	Oldcinemovies; YouTube (part 1)
United States	Bear Raid Warden	George Gordon	Barney Bear cartoon where he takes his role as an air raid warden too seriously.	YouTube
United States	Big Heel-Watha	Tex Avery	A Screwy Squirrel cartoon in which, because of rationing, a Native American Chief offers his daughter to anyone who can get meat for the tribe.	IA
United States	Buckaroo Bugs	Robert Clampett	Bugs Bunny cartoon in which Bugs as "The Masked Marauder" steals all the carrots from a town's Victory garden and later supposedly robs a train of rationed items.	IA
United States	Bugs Bunny Nips the Nips	Friz Freleng	Anti-Japanese cartoon in which Bugs Bunny targets Japanese soldiers with explosive ice cream.	YouTube
United States	Commando Duck	Jack King	Anti-Japanese Disney cartoon.	YouTube
United States	Hell-Bent for Election	Charles M. Jones	Cartoon, commissioned by the UAW, promoting the 1944 re-election of President Roosevelt.	YouTube
United States	How to Be a Sailor	Jack Kinney	Anti-Japanese Disney cartoon where Goofy, the torpedo, sinks IJN warships.	IA
United States	I Got Plenty of Mutton	Frank Tashlin	Cartoon about a wolf who, deprived of meat by war rationing, tries to steal a sheep from a flock guarded by ram "Killer Diller".	IA
Canada	Keep Your Mouth Shut	Norman McLaren	Animated film in which a death's head thanks Canadians for revealing military secrets.	NFB
United States	Lend Lease	Unknown	Cartoon written by Phil Eastman.	
United States	Little Red Riding Rabbit	Friz Freleng	Cartoon parody of Little Red Riding Hood with Bugs Bunny in which the teenaged Red's grandmother works the swing shift at Lockheed.	IA
United States	Meatless Flyday	Friz Freleng	This cartoon follows a spider trying to catch and eat a fly, only to find that that particular day is "Meatless Tuesday"..	IA
Vichy France	Nimbus libéré	Raymond Jeannin	Pro-Nazi cartoon in which bombers flown by Mickey Mouse, Donald Duck, Popeye, Goofy and Felix the Cat kill Frenchmen.	YouTube
United States	Plane Daffy	Frank Tashlin	Cartoon featuring Daffy Duck against the Nazi spy Hatta Mari.	IA
Canada	Proudest Girl in the World	Julian Roffman	Morale-boosting film in which a chorus of CWACs sing the title song. Music by Louis Applebaum and Wayne and Shuster.	NFB
United States	Russian Rhapsody	Robert Clampett	Anti-Nazi cartoon where Hitler in his bomber takes on the "Gremlins from the Kremlin".	YouTube
United States	Swooner Crooner	Frank Tashlin	Porky Pig's wartime egg farm production is disrupted by his hens going crazy over a crooning Frank Sinatra rooster, so a crooning Bing Crosby rooster steps in to help get production going again.	YouTube
United Kingdom	Two Fathers	Anthony Asquith	Dramatic film about two fathers, English and French, with children in the war.	
United States	The Weakly Reporter	Charles M. Jones	Cartoon lampooning sacrifices made on the homefront.	YouTube
United States	Yankee Doodle Donkey	I. Sparber	A Noveltoons cartoon that features Spunky the Donkey drafting himself to the WAG (a reference to the WAC, but with dogs instead).	YouTube

=== 1945 ===
Country	Title	Director	Events depicted	View online
United States	Behind the Meat-Ball	Frank Tashlin	A Looney Tunes cartoon that centers around a dog named Fido who hates having food with no meat, so when a steak is dropped by a meat delivery truck, Fido and two other dogs fight over it.	IA
United States	Draftee Daffy	Robert Clampett	A Looney Tunes cartoon that centers around Daffy Duck trying to evade the Little Man from the Draft Board.	IA
United States	Herr Meets Hare	Friz Freleng	Anti-Nazi cartoon where Bugs Bunny, who has mistakenly arrived in Germany, meets Hermann Göring, then imitates both Hitler and Stalin.	YouTube
United States	Jerky Turkey	Tex Avery	A cartoon lampooning rationing and wartime shortages taking place during the early days of the Pilgrims in which a Pilgrim goes hunting for a Thanksgiving turkey.	IA
Imperial Japan	Momotarō's Devine Sea Warriors (桃太郎 海の神兵)	Mitsuyo Seo	Feature-length anti-Allied cartoon.	YouTube
United States	Swing Shift Cinderella	Tex Avery	Cartoon where a voluptuous glamour girl also works at the aircraft plant.	IA
Greece	The Duce Dictates (Ο Ντούτσε αφηγείται)	Stamatis Polenakis	The first animation made in Greece. Mussolini in his castle dictates the exploits of the fascist army during the Italian invasion of Greece to a personification of Italian history.	YouTube
United States	The Shooting of Dan McGoo	Tex Avery	A Droopy cartoon in which a voluptuous glamour girl represents and sings about the different branches of the Armed Forces.	IA
United States	When G.I. Johnny Comes Home	Seymour Kneitel	Musical cartoon with soldiers and sailors coming home.	IA

== Films made after the war ==
=== 1940s to 1980s ===
Year	Country	Title	Director	Events depicted	View online
1946	United States	G.I. Wanna Home (G.I. Wanna Go Home)	Jules White	Comedy with the Three Stooges.	
1946	Czechoslovakia	Springman and the SS (Pérák a SS)	Jiří Brdečka & Jiří Trnka	Anti-Nazi cartoon where the SS arrest any Czech subversive, like a bird whistling "Yankee Doodle", before the SS are stopped by the superhero Pérák, the Spring Man of Prague.	YouTube
1955	United States	Good Will to Men	William Hanna & Joseph Barbera	Anti-war cartoon. Remake of Peace on Earth.	YouTube
1963	West Germany	Machorka-Muff	Jean-Marie Straub & Danièle Huillet (uncredited)	Drama about lingering Nazi thought among German veterans, based on a story by Heinrich Böll.	
1970	Spain	Estado de sitio	Jaime Chávarri; Jaime Chávarri	Spanish Civil War.	
1971	Soviet Union	The Pioneer's Violin (Скрипка пионера) (Skripka pionera)	Boris Stepantsev	About one of the Pioneers-heroes.	YouTube
1983	United States	What Have We Learned, Charlie Brown?	Bill Melendez	Animated TV programme in which the Peanuts characters visit war memorials.	YouTube; YouTube; YouTube
1985	United States	An Officer and a Duck	Jack King	Disney compilation cartoon detailing the adventures of Pvt. Donald Duck.	IA
1988	Japan	Grave of the Fireflies (火垂るの墓)	Isao Takahata	Feature-length Anime based on the novel of Akiyuki Nosaka. Story about a boy and his sister in the last days of the war.	

=== 1990s ===
Year	Country	Title	Director	Events depicted	View online
1991	United States	Ein Neuer Anfang from The Rocketeer	Mark Dindal	Fake pro-Nazi cartoon.	YouTube
1994	Spain	Alsasua 1936	Helena Taberna	Spanish Civil War.	
1994	United States	Of Course, You Know This Means Warners from Animaniacs	Lenord Robinson & Dave Marshall	Retrospective cartoon showing how everyone, including Hollywood stars (Warner Bros.), helped fight on the home front.	
1995	United States	Carrotblanca	Douglas McCarthy	Cartoon featuring Bugs Bunny. The film parodies Casablanca.	YouTube
1999	Australia	Harry's War	Richard Frankland	The story of an Aboriginal Australian during World War II.	

=== 2000s ===
Year	Country	Title	Director	Events depicted	View online
2003	France	The Release	Sebastien Laban	Animated film.	YouTube
2003	United States; Japan	Urda: The Third Reich	Romanov Higa	Anime in which the Nazi Party discovers a marooned spaceship capable of time travel when the war is going badly for them.	YouTube (episodes 1–5)
2004	New Zealand	Tama Tū	Taika Waititi	Six Māori Battalion soldiers camped in Italian ruins wait for night to fall. In the silence the bros-in-arms distract themselves with jokes. A tohu (sign) brings them back to reality and they gather to say a karakia before returning to the fray.	
2005	Germany; France	The Colonial Friend (L'ami y'a bon)	Rachid Bouchareb	Animated film.	YouTube
2005	Romania; France	Tertium non-datur	Lucian Pintilie		YouTube (end credits)
2007	United States	End of a Rope	Daniel Lahr	A Nazi prisoner faces ghosts from his past before meeting his end. Based on the short story, "An Occurrence at Owl Creek Bridge".	
2008	United States	The Bridge	Sheldon Schwartz	Film where a Japanese-American soldier in Italy embarks on a dangerous mission.	YouTube
2008	United Kingdom	Red Letter	Edilberto Restino	Drama where a German soldier tries to kill Hitler in Paris, 1942. Followed by Brunette Kiss.	YouTube (trailer)
2008	Canada	Servants of War	Gillian MacLeod	Drama depicting lives of sisters torn apart by Imperial Japanese Army soldiers invading their home	
2009	Spain	Campás	Jairo Iglesias	Spanish Civil War.	YouTube (trailer)
2009	Philippines	Pedro	Regeene Ho	Drama. A man, who refuses to surrender to Japanese soldiers, on his journey to go back to his wife & daughter after escaping from hanging execution.	YouTube (trailer)

=== 2010s ===
Year	Country	Title	Director	Events depicted	View online
2010	United States	The Bridge	Marlon Torres	Drama in which a deceased US Army medic meets soldiers from his past.	Vimeo (trailer)
2010	Brazil	Brunette Kiss	Edilberto Restino	Drama in which a German soldier tells his life story to his grandson, a boy with Down syndrome and a prodigious memory. Sequel to Red Letter.	YouTube (trailer)
2010	Canada	I Was a Child of Holocaust Survivors	Ann Marie Fleming	Animated film.	NFB (clip)
2010	Serbia; Switzerland	X & O	Acim Vasic	Short film. In the depths of a snowy forest in an unknown wartime, two soldiers from opposing armies try to outwit each other in a perilous game of cat and mouse - until they find themselves outplayed by destiny.	(short film)
2011	United States	Breakdown	Thomas Lynskey	Short film. A vignette driven film about a Soviet trap against a squad of German soldiers.	(short film)
2011	United States	Courage Too Late	Thomas Lynskey	Short film. A romance brews between a male and female Soviet soldier while their platoon is sent to capture a German colonel.	(short film)
2012	Turkey	Biomen Shampoo commercial		Ad featuring film clip from Triumph of the Will	YouTube
2013	Japan	艦隊これくしょん -艦これ-	Kusakawa Keizou	Anime which describes IJN warship to girls.	
2016	United Kingdom	Our Father	Calum Rhys	Short film. The Second World War is experienced through the journey of Private Cole - an odyssey of friendship, innocence and adventure set against a canvas of war-torn France.	
2016	Finland	Radio Dolores	Katariina Lillqvist	Stop motion puppet film of a Finnish volunteer of the Spanish Civil War.	YouTube (director's interview)
2017	United States	Freund	Nathan Cragun	A German sniper questions the morality of his actions after coming face to face with his enemy.	YouTube
2017	United States	Esperanca	Nathan Cragun	After being separated from his unit during the battle for Montese, a Brazilian soldier fights a battle with himself to continue on. He must see if he has the hope and will to move on.	YouTube
2017	Australia	Daily Bread	Ruby Challenger	In a WWII internment camp in Indonesia, Jeanne and a group of Dutch women and children face a daily struggle against abuse, disease, and starvation. Meanwhile, the camp commandant's beloved white fluffy cat is fed fresh juicy meat.	
2019	United States	Minor Accident of War	Diane Fredel-Weis	In 1945, WWII veteran Edward Field, now 95 years of age, flew 27 missions over Germany during the war. On his 3rd mission, his plane was hit by flak and crash landed in the North sea. This is the story of Field's survival.	Official Website

== See also ==
- Bugs & Daffy: The Wartime Cartoons
- List of Private Snafu shorts featuring Private Snafu character

Other cartoons of feature length

- Victory Through Air Power (1943)
- Castle in the Sky (1986)
- Graveyard of the Fireflies (1988)
- Rocks in My Pockets (2004) - partially set during World War II but also includes scenes set both before and after the war
- Valiant (2005)

Earlier war cartoons

- The Sinking of the Lusitania (1918)
- China in Flames (1925) – Soviet cartoon about the Chinese Civil War
- Dinky Doodle in the Army (192?) with Dinky Doodle
- Great Guns! (1927) with Oswald the Lucky Rabbit
- I'm in the Army Now (1936) with Popeye and Bluto

Other films of World War II

- List of World War II films – fictional features and miniseries
  - List of World War II TV series – fictional TV series
- List of Allied propaganda films of World War II
- List of Holocaust films – fictional and documentary
- List of German films 1933–1945
- List of films based on war books – includes World War II section
