= Donald's Tire Trouble =

1943 Donald Duck cartoon

- Theatrical release poster
- Directed by: Dick Lundy
- Story by: Carl Barks; Harry Reeves
- Produced by: Walt Disney
- Starring: Clarence Nash
- Music by: Oliver Wallace
- Animation by: Bob Carlson
- Layouts by: Kendall O'Connor
- Color process: Technicolor
- Production company: Walt Disney Productions
- Distributed by: RKO Radio Pictures
- Release date: January 29, 1943; (USA)
- Running time: 7 minutes
- Country: United States
- Language: English

Donald's Tire Trouble is a cartoon by Walt Disney Productions, featuring their character Donald Duck. It was directed by Dick Lundy and released in 1943. The cartoon pokes fun at the difficulties involved in America's rubber rationing, a consequence of World War II.

== Plot ==
Donald Duck is happily driving along the road in his car when he suddenly gets a flat tire. Confident in his mechanical skills, he sets out to change the tire—but things quickly spiral into chaos.

As Donald struggles to remove the old tire, everything seems to go wrong. He fights with the jack, which refuses to cooperate, and wrestles with the lug nuts, which won’t budge. When he finally manages to get the tire off, he faces an even greater challenge: putting the new tire on!

His short temper gets the best of him as the tire bounces away, causing Donald to chase after it in frustration. In the end, after many failures and a lot of angry quacking, Donald finally succeeds—only for all four tires to pop and Donald drives away unsatisfied.

== Voice cast ==
- Donald Duck: Clarence Nash

== Releases ==
- 1943 – theatrical release
- c. 1972 – The Mouse Factory, episode #34: "Automobiles" (TV)
- c. 1983 – Good Morning, Mickey!, episode #36 (TV)
- 1997 – The Ink and Paint Club, episode #1.56: "Wartime Disney" (TV)
- 2011 – Have a Laugh!, episode #26 (TV)
- 2019 – Disney+ (streaming)

== Home media ==
The short was released on December 6, 2005, on Walt Disney Treasures: The Chronological Donald, Volume Two: 1942-1946.

Additional releases include:

- 1984 – "Cartoon Classics - Limited Gold Edition: Donald" (VHS)

== See also ==
- List of World War II short films
- Porky's Tire Trouble
