= Edilberto Restino =

Brazilian/Italian film director

- Born: Edilberto Restino

Edilberto Restino, sociologist and political scientist, is better known as a film director and actor. He created the Tango puzzle method for actors. With 21 awards, Restino is one of the most awarded directors in the UK.

Restino (known in Brazil as Restini) started his career as a photographer for magazines in parallel with an actor career in theatre and as choreographer. He has worked with publicity for many years, has directed plays, and wrote 5 books, "Tao, Tango and Temptation", "Blood Bank", "Reflexos", "Ser, Nao Estar "and "COH, Onirico!". He had his own advertisement agency and actor agency in Brazil for six years. As a sociologist, he was invited by the environmental organization Projeto Planeta Verde in São Paulo, and became their director of communication for 13 years. He was as well vice-president of SOS Fauna Brazil for 5 years, an organization that fights against wild traffic in the Brazilian forests. While doing those works, he was invited to run as candidate for State Deputy elections for São Paulo state and MP elections in São Paulo city. In UK he lived and worked with adults with learning disabilities for 4 years in charity organizations. He used his technique to teach dance to them.

In 2007, in UK, Restino produced, directed and did the cinematography for "Red Letter" (a teaser/pilot for the feature Timeless Eye) which became the first short film from Brighton Film Studios to be chosen by the British Society of Cinematographers (BSC) to be premiered at the Pinewood Studios New Cinematographers Night in 2008 and be shortlisted to Student Academy Awards, Oscar. To date, Red Letter has won 13 awards from film festivals across the UK and US including Best Director, Best Visual/Cinematography twice, Best Set Design and Best Short Film three times.

He did the cinematography of the feature "The Scandalous Four" in 2009, and it was awarded in 2011 at British Independent Film Festival and in California International Film Festival.

In 2009/10, Restino directed "Beijo de Morena" ( A Brunette Kiss) marking his first collaboration with Oscar-winning composer Stephen Warbeck, multi-award-winning cinematographer Tony Imi and producer Paul E. Brooker. " A Brunette Kiss" was finalized in June 2010, winning Best Director Award at Rob Knox Film Festival 2011, the Best Visual Award at Limelight Film Awards in London 2010, The Grand Prix Award, The Best Set Design Award and Best Performance in a Film Award at The EOTP International Film Festival 2011/12, and it is nominated in various other festivals.

With Tony Imi and Bridie he also shot Bridge Over Blue in 2010. That won Best Director Award and the Best Actress award at the Rob Knox Film Festival, in London in 2015.

Restino has been teaching tango for actors for 20 years extending his way to other teachers in Brazil and the UK.

== See also ==
- The End of the Pier International Film Festival
