= Rationing in the United States =

Government-controlled distribution of scarce goods in the US

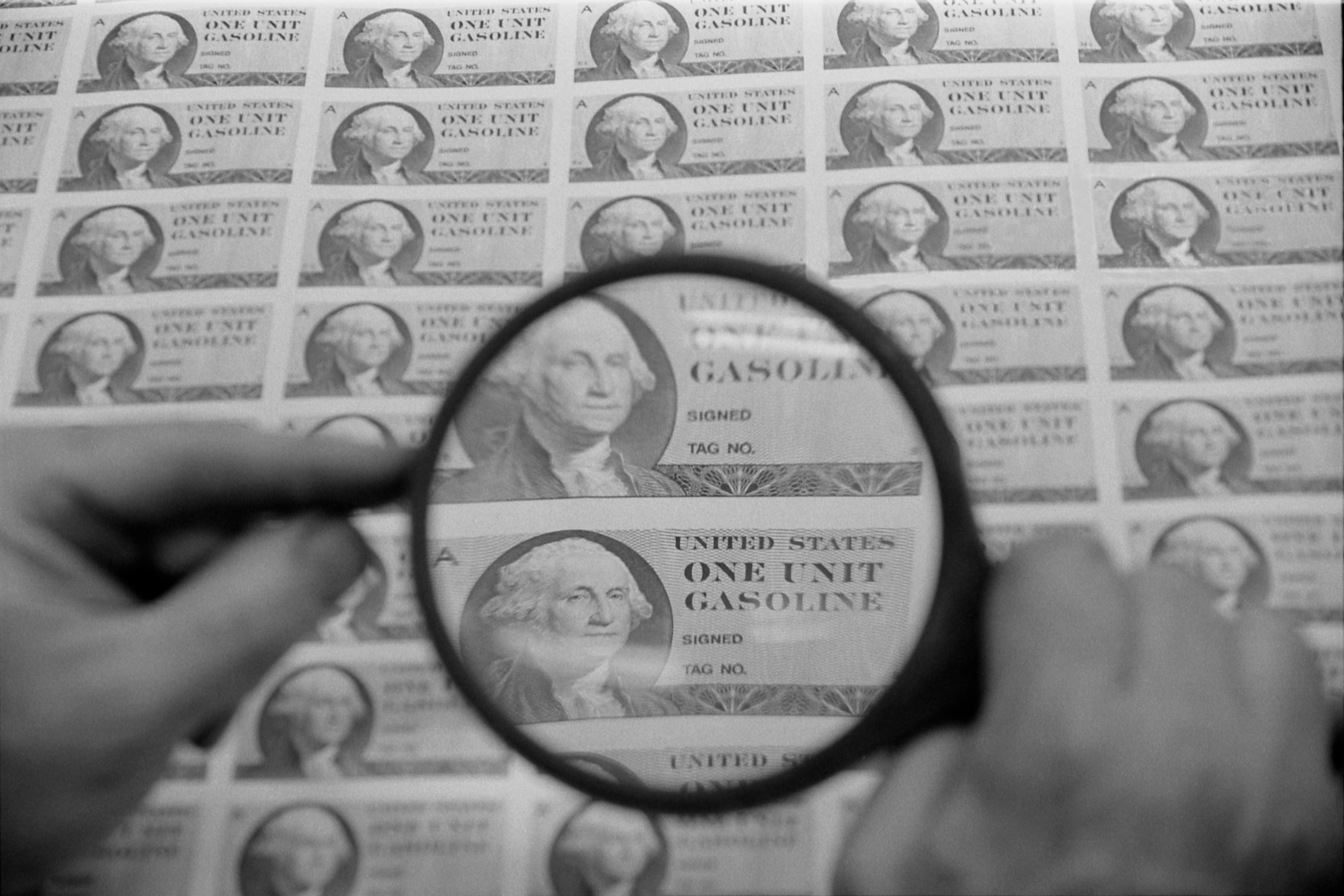
Ration stamps printed, but not used, as a result of the 1973 oil crisis

Rationing in the United States was introduced in stages during World War II, with the last of the restrictions ending in June 1946. In the wake of the 1973 oil crisis, gas stations across the country enacted different rationing policies and standby rationing plans were introduced.

== World War I ==
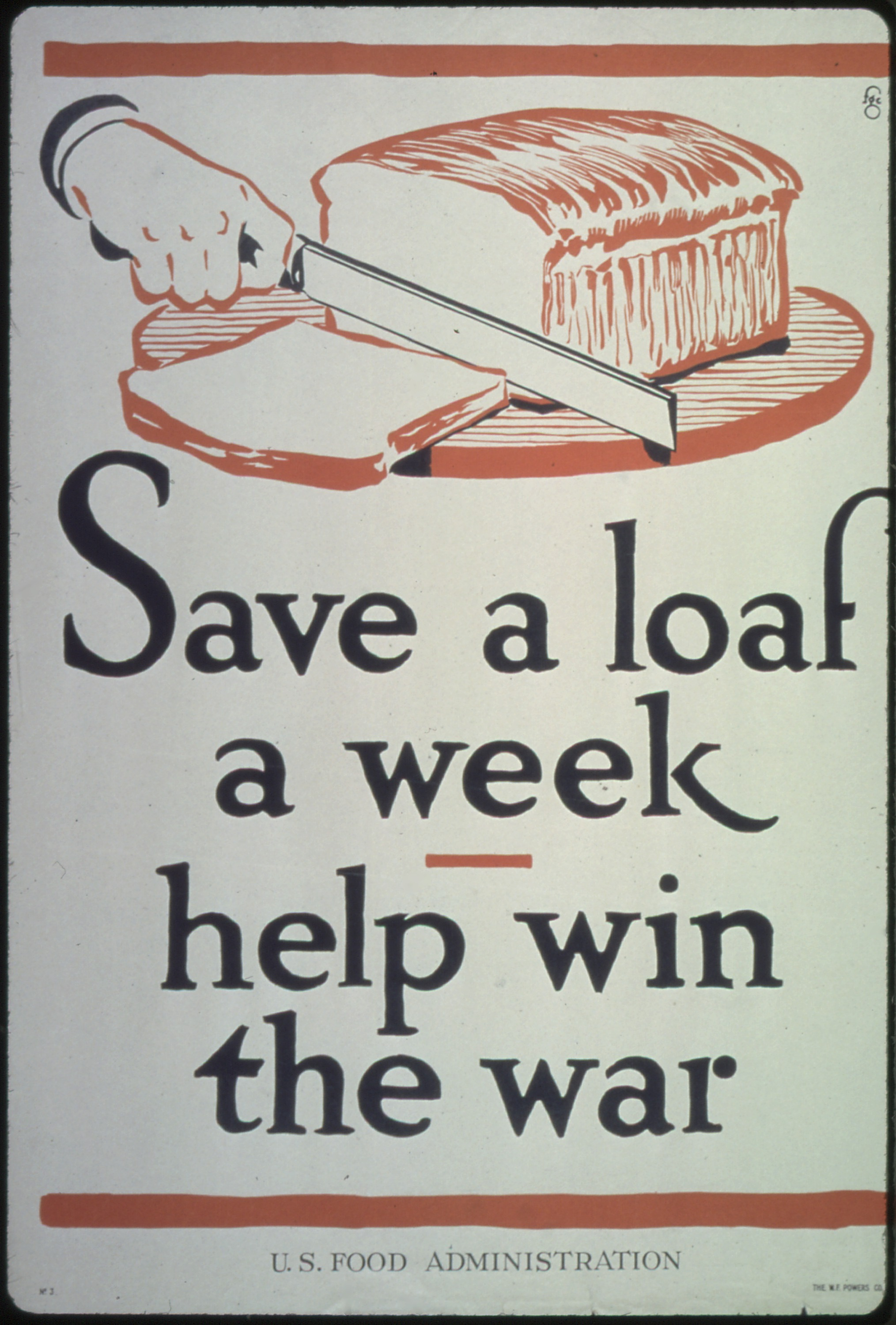
The U.S. Food Administration managed the wartime supply and distribution of food, and promoted a voluntary austerity program that supported the war effort.

Although the United States did not have food rationing in World War I, it relied heavily on propaganda campaigns to persuade people to curb their food consumption. Propaganda was targeted disproportionally towards middle class white women, and their organization provided some of the most substantial support for Hoover's program to limit consumption. Women's groups, like the Women's committees of the State Council of Defense, organized in a variety of ways to try to provide relief from the shortages. In Wisconsin, they organized to can and preserve the food that grew in the gardens of unoccupied houses. Some states also implemented their own programs to help conserve foods which were in limited supply due to the war. In Wisconsin, the Council of Defense asked wholesale bakers to sign a pledge to keep bread on the shelves for longer durations.

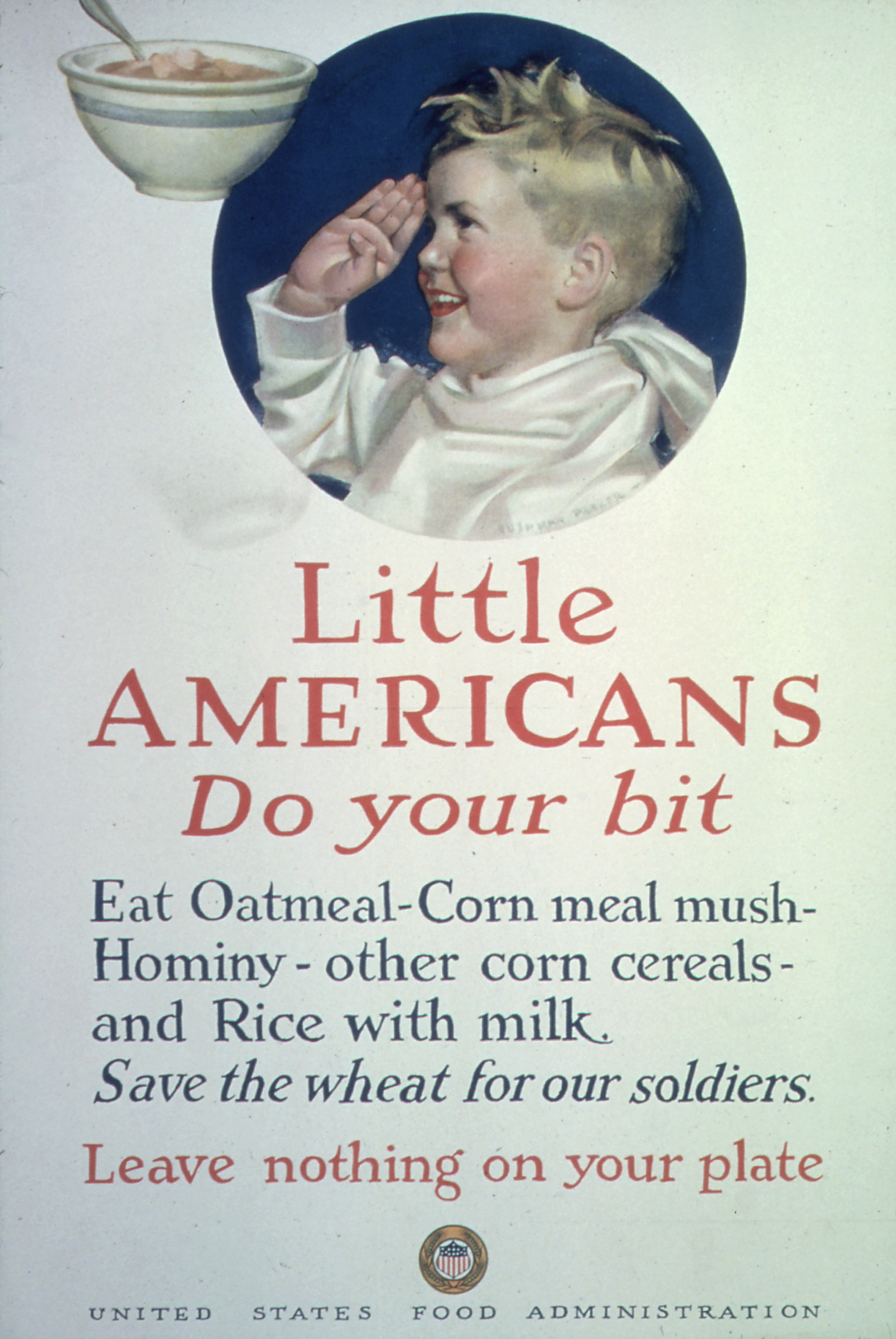
The U.S. Food Administration encouraged children to consume other types of grain, and not wheat cereals during World War I.

Food conservation, as the US government called it, was seen as an act of patriotism. People were encouraged to keep victory gardens or shop locally in order to conserve transportation for the war effort. People were also encouraged to participate in 'Meatless Mondays', and when meat was served, all parts of the animal were to be eaten, including the offal. Wheat alternatives were encouraged, such as barley, corn, oats and hominy.

== World War II ==
We discovered that the American people are basically honest and talk too much.

— A ration board member

In the summer of 1941, rationing in the United Kingdom increased because of military needs, and German attacks on shipping in the Battle of the Atlantic. The British government appealed to Americans to conserve food to help the UK. The Office of Price Administration (OPA) warned Americans of potential gasoline, steel, aluminum, and electricity shortages. It believed that with factories converting to military production and consuming many critical supplies, rationing would become necessary if the country entered the war. The OPA established a rationing system after the attack on Pearl Harbor on 7 December 1941.

=== Ration books, stamps, and tokens ===
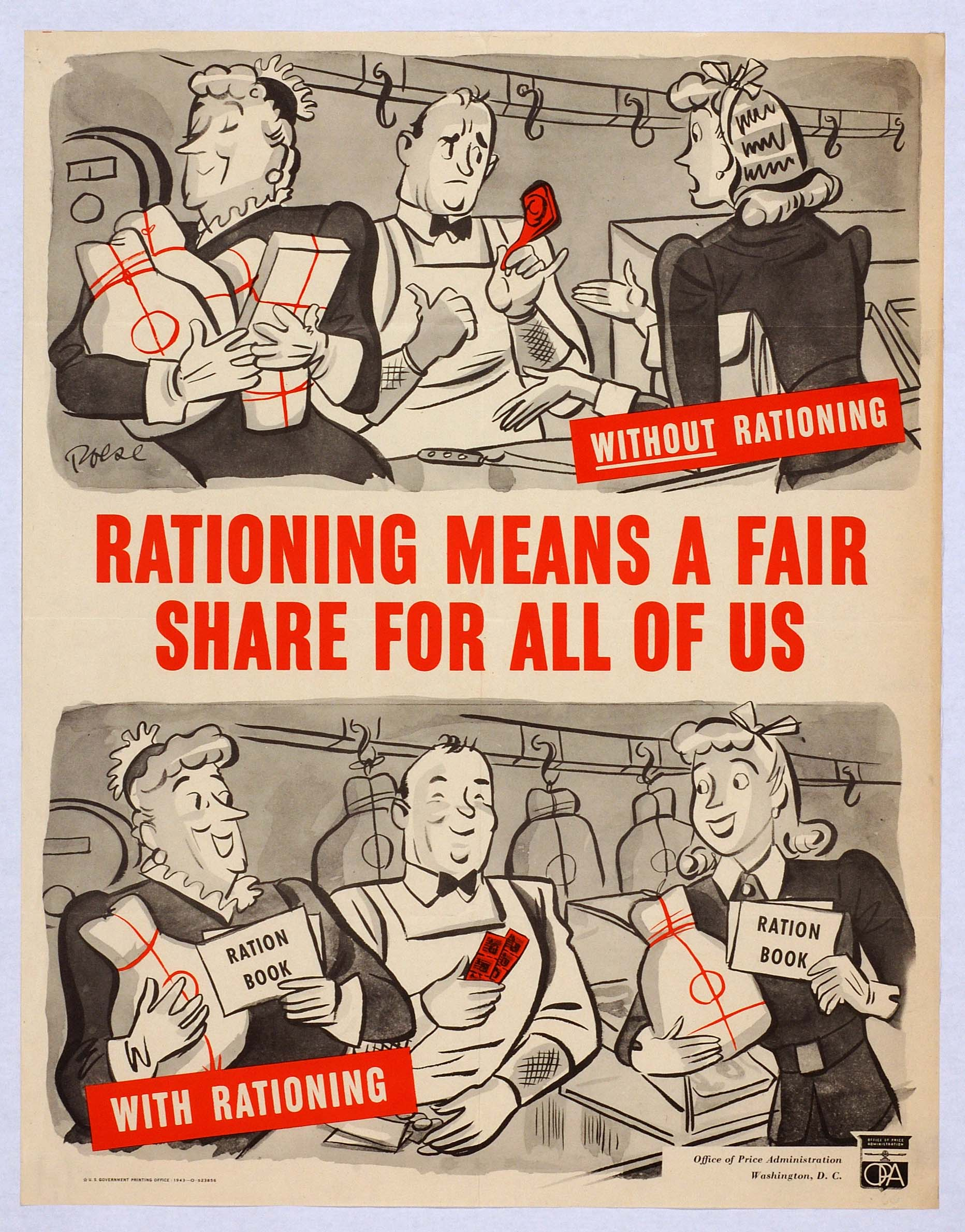
An anti-hoarding, pro-rationing poster from the United States in World War II

The work of issuing ration books and exchanging used stamps for certificates was handled by some 5,500 local ration boards of mostly volunteer workers selected by local officials. Many levels of rationing went into effect. Some items, such as sugar, were distributed evenly based on the number of people in a household. Other items, like gasoline or fuel oil, were rationed only to those who could justify a need. Restaurant owners and other merchants were accorded more availability, but had to collect ration stamps to restock their supplies. In exchange for used ration stamps, ration boards delivered certificates to restaurants and merchants to authorize procurement of more products.

Each ration stamp had a generic drawing of an airplane, gun, tank, aircraft carrier, ear of wheat, fruit, etc. and a serial number. Some stamps also had alphabetic lettering. The kind and amount of rationed commodities were not specified on most of the stamps and were not defined until later when local newspapers published, for example, that beginning on a specified date, one airplane stamp was required (in addition to cash) to buy one pair of shoes and one stamp number 30 from ration book four was required to buy five pounds of sugar. The commodity amounts changed from time to time depending on availability. Red stamps were used to ration meat and butter, and blue stamps were used to ration processed foods.

To enable making change for ration stamps, the government issued "red point" tokens to be given in change for red stamps, and "blue point" tokens in change for blue stamps. The red and blue tokens were about the size of dimes (16 millimetres (0.63 in)) and were made of thin compressed wood fiber material, because metals were in short supply.

There was a black market in stamps. To prevent this, the OPA ordered vendors not to accept stamps that they themselves did not tear out of books. Buyers, however, circumvented this by saying (sometimes accurately, as the books were not well-made) that the stamps had "fallen out". In actuality, they may have acquired stamps from other family members or friends, or the black market.

Most rationing restrictions ended in August 1945 except for sugar rationing, which lasted until 1946 in some parts of the country.

=== Tires, gasoline, and automobiles ===
Tires were the first item to be rationed by the OPA, which ordered the temporary end of sales on 11 December 1941 while it created 7,500 unpaid, volunteer three-person tire ration boards around the country. By 5 January 1942 the boards were ready. Each received a monthly allotment of tires based on the number of local vehicle registrations, and allocated them to applicants based on OPA rules. There was a shortage of natural rubber for tires since the Japanese quickly conquered the rubber-producing regions of Southeast Asia. Although synthetic rubber had been invented before the war, it had been unable to compete with natural rubber commercially, so the US did not have enough manufacturing capacity at the start of the war to replace the lost imports of natural rubber, moreover, wartime synthetic rubber was significantly inferior in quality to natural rubber. Throughout the war, rationing of gasoline was motivated by a desire to conserve rubber as much as by a desire to conserve gasoline.

The War Production Board (WPB) ordered the temporary cessation of all civilian automobile sales on 1 January 1942, leaving dealers with one half million unsold cars. Ration boards grew in size as they began evaluating automobile sales in February (only certain professions, such as doctors and clergymen, qualified to purchase the remaining inventory of new automobiles), typewriters in March, and bicycles in May. Automobile factories stopped manufacturing civilian models by early February 1942 and converted to producing tanks, aircraft, weapons, and other military products, with the United States government as the only customer.

A national speed limit of 35 miles per hour (56 km/h) was imposed to save fuel and rubber for tires. Later that month volunteers again helped distribute gasoline cards in 17 Atlantic and Pacific Northwest states.

To get a classification and rationing stamps, one had to appear before a local War Price and Rationing Board which reported to the OPA. Each person in a household received a ration book, including babies and small children who qualified for canned milk not available to others. To receive a gasoline ration card, a person had to certify a need for gasoline and ownership of no more than five tires. All tires in excess of five per driver were confiscated by the government, because of rubber shortages.

An "A" sticker on a car was the lowest priority of gasoline rationing and entitled the car owner to 3 to 4 US gallons (11 to 15 L; 2.5 to 3.3 imp gal) of gasoline per week. "B" stickers were issued to workers in the military industry, entitling their holder to up to 8 US gallons (30 L; 6.7 imp gal) of gasoline per week. "C" stickers were granted to persons deemed very essential to the war effort, such as doctors. Motorcycles had D papers and motorcycle users who were essential to the war got "M" papers. "E" and "R" stickers applied to small and heavy highway machinery, respectively. "T" stickers were made available for truckers. Lastly, "X" stickers on cars entitled the holder to unlimited supplies and were the highest priority in the system. Clergy, police, firemen, and civil defense workers were in this category. A scandal erupted when 200 Congressmen received these X stickers. Referring to the lowest tier of this system, American motorists jokingly said that OPA stood for "Only a Puny A-Card".

As a result of the gasoline rationing, all forms of automobile racing, including the Indianapolis 500, were banned. Sightseeing driving was also banned. In some regions, breaking the gas rationing was so prevalent that night courts were set up to supplement the number of violators caught; the first gasoline-ration night court was created at Pittsburgh's Fulton Building on May 26, 1943.

With the pending capitulation of Japan, the printing of ration books for 1946 was halted by the OPA on August 13, 1945. It was thought that "even if Japan does not fold now, the war will certainly be over before the books can be used". After just two days, on August 15, 1945, Japan surrendered, and World War II gas rationing was ended on the West Coast of the United States.

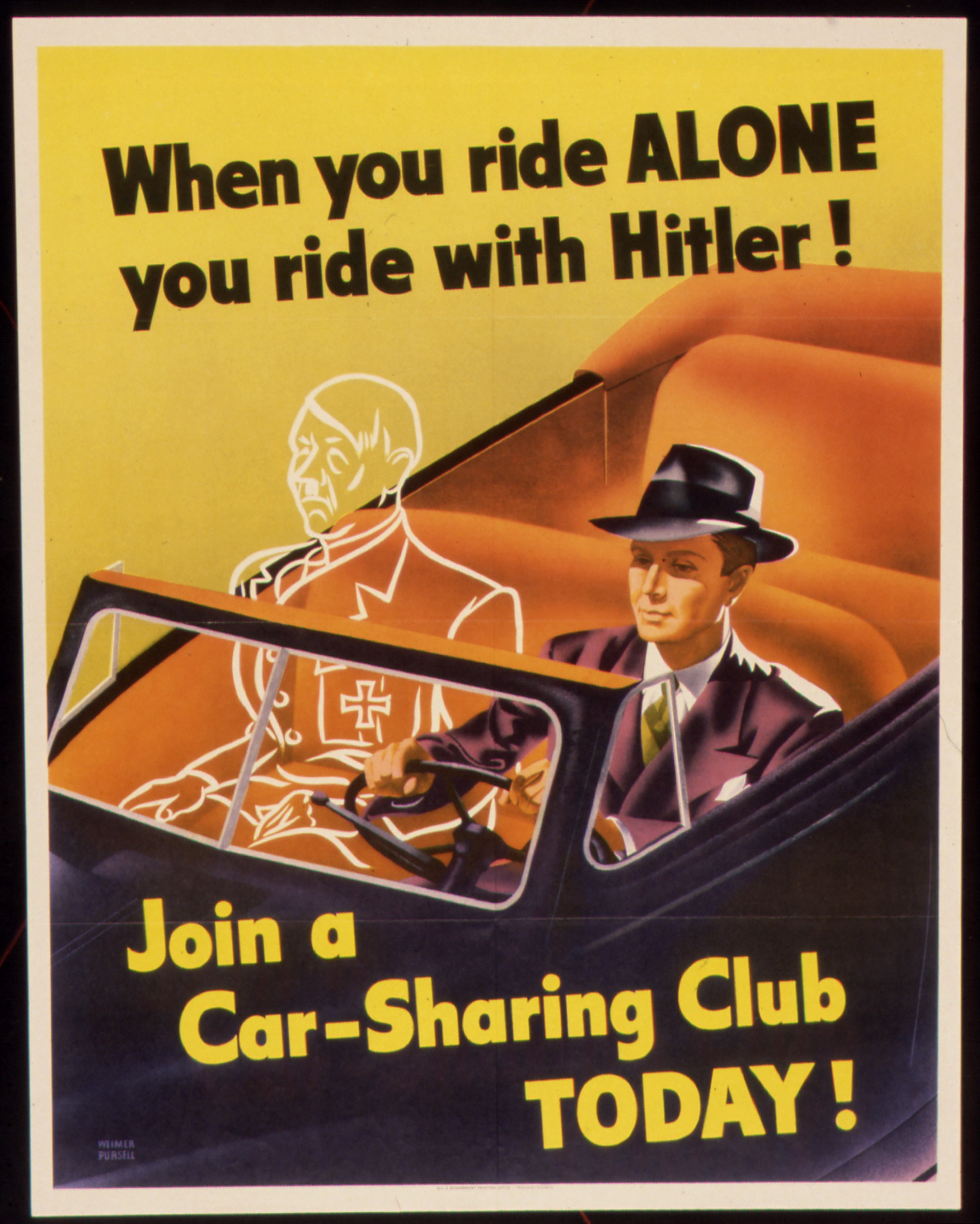
Posters with, 'When you ride ALONE you ride with Hitler!' were created to reinforce the message that it is the Americans patriotic duty to share rides to help the war cause.

From the time that the United States entered the war at the end of 1941 to the August 1945 Japanese surrender, there was a dramatic shift in behavior: Americans drove cars less, carpooled when they did drive, walked and used their bicycles more, and increased the use of public transportation. Between 1941 and 1944 the total amount of gas consumed from highway use in the United States dropped to 32 percent. The federal agency named the Office of Defense Transportation (ODT) was established during the war to focus on controlling domestic transportation and was responsible for collecting data, conducting research and analysis, setting goals for fuel consumption and helping determine rationing coupon values. ODT-imposed rationing of gasoline to civilians caused car owners to drive less, thus extending tire life and conserving fuel to maximize the oil and rubber available for military use.

In January 1942 there was a study published by the Public Roads Administration that discovered that driving 35 mph (56 km/h) helped tires last four times as long as if the speed was 65 mph (105 km/h). In order to extend the lifespan of tires and reduce their use, the ODT contacted the governors of all the states to establish lower speed limits. In March of the same year, to decrease the large number of drivers without passengers, car sharing programs were encouraged by the ODT and the Highway Traffic Advisory Committee for workplaces that had more than 100 employees.

=== Food and consumer goods ===
As of 1 March 1942, dog food could no longer be sold in tin cans, and manufacturers switched to dehydrated versions. As of 1 April 1942, anyone wishing to purchase a new toothpaste tube, then made from metal, had to turn in an empty one.

Sugar was the first consumer commodity rationed, with all sales ended on 27 April 1942 and resumed on 5 May with a ration of 1/2 pound (8 oz; 227 g) per person per week, half of normal consumption. Bakeries, ice cream makers, and other commercial users received rations of about 70% of normal usage.

Civilians first received ration books—War Ration Book Number One, or the "Sugar Book"—on 4 May 1942, through more than 100,000 schoolteachers, PTA groups, and other volunteers.

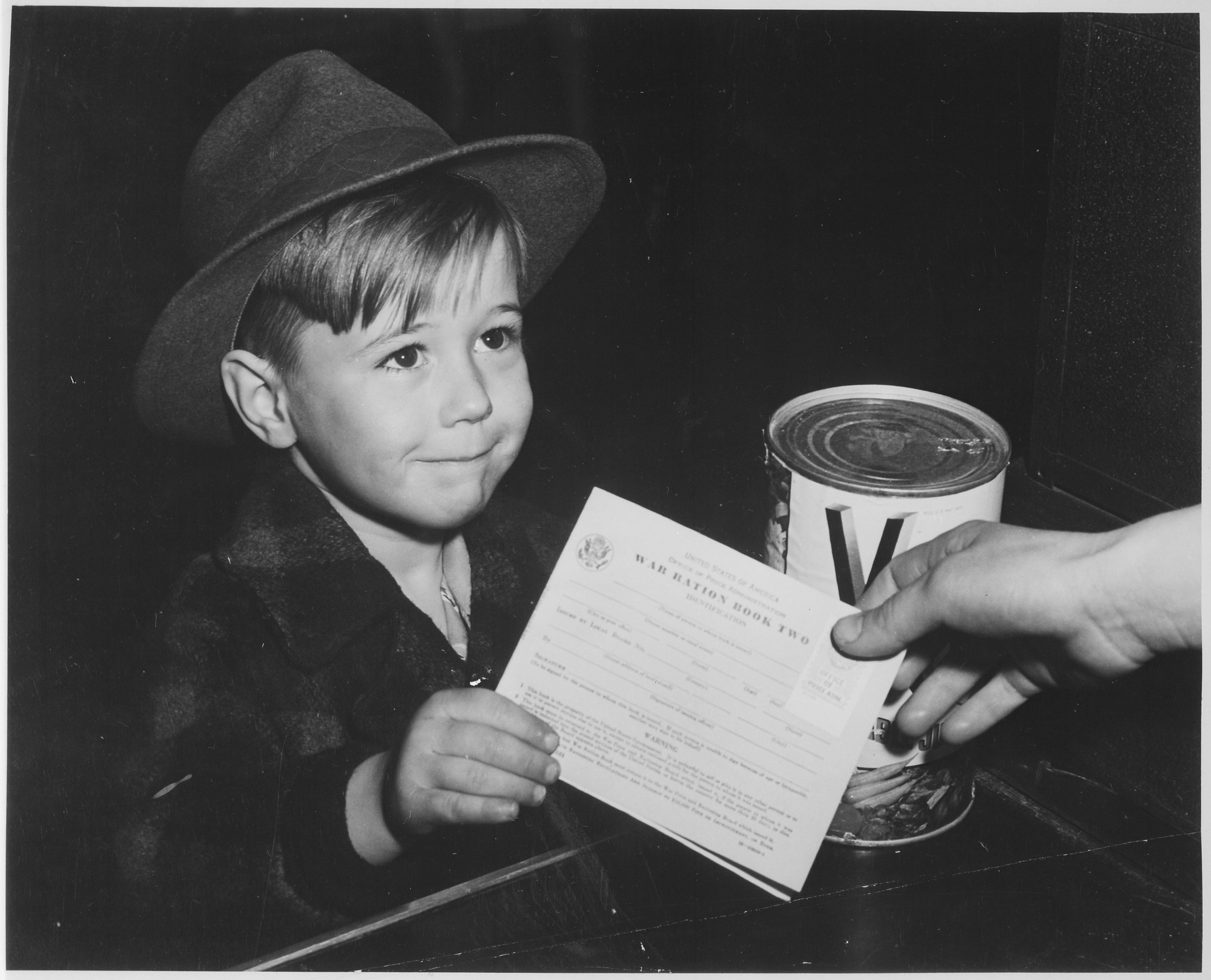
An American child purchases a can of V8 juice, handing the grocer his ration book.

Point Rationing of Foods, a 1943 animated propaganda short directed by Chuck Jones

By June 1942 companies also stopped manufacturing metal office furniture, radios, television sets, phonographs, refrigerators, vacuum cleaners, washing machines, and sewing machines for civilians.

Coffee was rationed nationally on 29 November 1942 to 1 pound (454 g) every five weeks, about half of normal consumption, in part because of German attacks on shipping from Brazil.

By the end of 1942, ration coupons were used for nine other items: typewriters, gasoline, bicycles, shoes, rubber footwear, silk, nylon, fuel oil, and stoves. Meat, lard, shortening and food oils, cheese, butter, margarine, processed foods (canned, bottled, and frozen), dried fruits, canned milk, firewood and coal, jams, jellies, and fruit butter were rationed by November 1943.

Many retailers welcomed rationing because they were already experiencing shortages of many items due to rumors and panics, such as flashlights and batteries after Pearl Harbor.

Unlike in the United Kingdom, the United States did not ration clothing and fabric. However, the War Production Board issued rules to manufacturers prescribing shorter hemlines; narrower lapels and sleeves; fewer pockets; and banning hoods, cuffs, pleats, and frills, to reduce civilian cloth consumption by 15% and conserve resources for uniforms, parachutes, and other military applications.

=== Medicines ===
Scarce medicines such as penicillin were rationed by triage officers in the US military during World War II. Civilian hospitals received only small amounts of penicillin during the war, because it was not mass-produced for civilian use until after the war. A triage panel at each hospital decided which patients would receive the penicillin.

== Gasoline rationing in the 1970s ==
Rationing policies were enacted in response to both the 1973 oil crisis and the 1979 oil crisis, and policies varied by states. In California, even-odd rationing systems were created which alternated the days on which even- and odd-numbered license plates could get gas. Gas stations throughout the country shortened their hours and on some days only served emergency vehicles. These policies were often met with hostility from consumers. In Baltimore, the fuel shortage peaked in February 1974 with gas station lines up to 5 miles long and violent threats made towards gas station owners.

After the 1973 embargo, debates began over the necessity of gas rationing and rotation plans. President Richard Nixon reacted by creating the Federal Energy Office (FEO) which created a rationing plan that involved printing 4.8 billion rationing coupons that were to be distributed to driver's license holders, with the availability of mass transit being taken into account. In 1975, Congress passed the Energy Policy and Conservation Act which required that rationing plans undergo congressional review. The next plan to be submitted was that of President Gerald Ford, before he left office in January 1977.

After assuming the presidency, Jimmy Carter withdrew Ford's plan, citing issues with the efficiency and implementation of the plan. These plans faced scrutiny from the Chamber of Commerce, who stated in 1979 that they "opposed any form of rationing or allocation as solutions to current or future energy problems". Throughout the country, rationing plans were a point of contention. One Gallup poll in 1979 found that 40% of Americans polled favored a rationing program that would require Americans to drive one fourth less. Initially, Carter's proposed plan kept the part of Johnson's plan that called for gas to be equally distributed by drivers' licenses. This drew widespread criticism because it did not allow for differences between the amounts of gas needed in different areas. This criticism caused Carter to amend the plan, basing the allocation instead around historic consumption. Another amendment was added at the request of the Republican opposition which would require a 20% shortage for 30 days in order to enact the plan. The Senate voted in favor of this plan based around historic consumption by 58 to 39, but it failed in the House by 159 to 246. After this failure, the Carter administration negotiated with Congress, resulting in the Emergency Energy Conservation Act being signed into law, which provided that Congress was not required to approve the plan, and instead could only vote to reject it. On July 30, 1980, Carter's plan was enacted and the United States had a standby plan for rationing gasoline, based around historic consumption, with provisions for special usage for certain industries and a white market.

== Gallery ==
World War II rationing documents, United States, around 1943

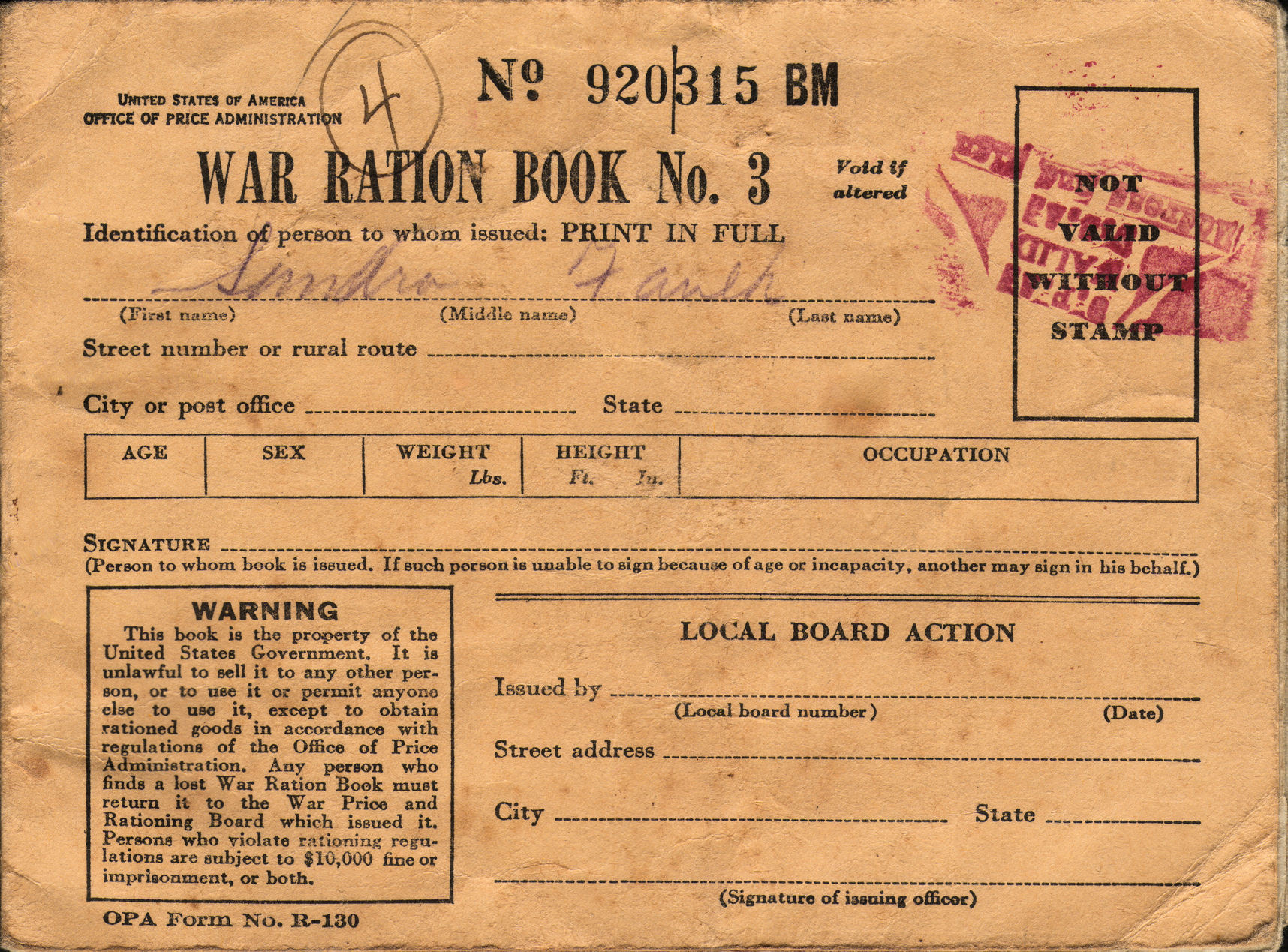
USA Ration Book No. 3 circa 1943, front

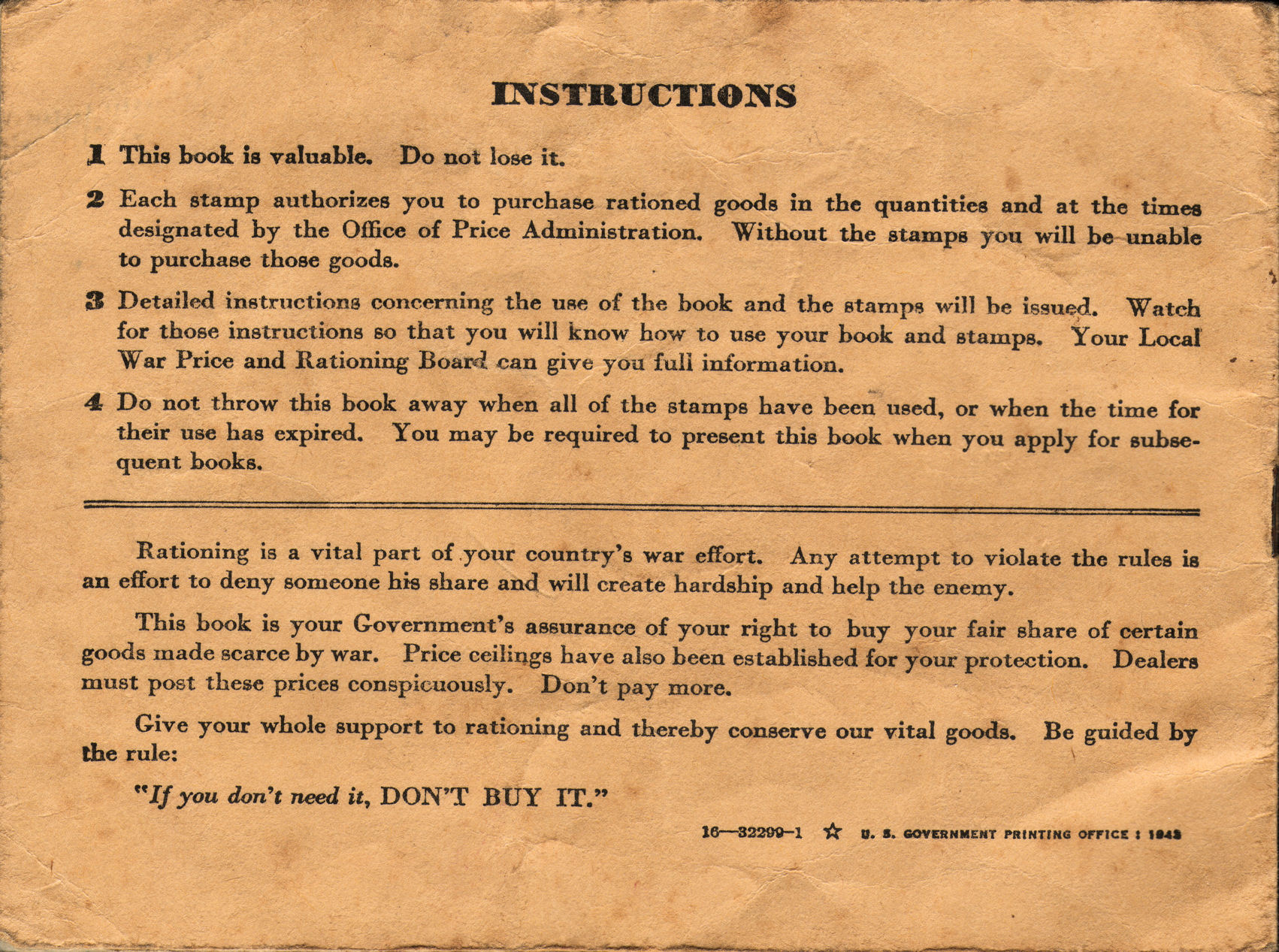
Back of ration book

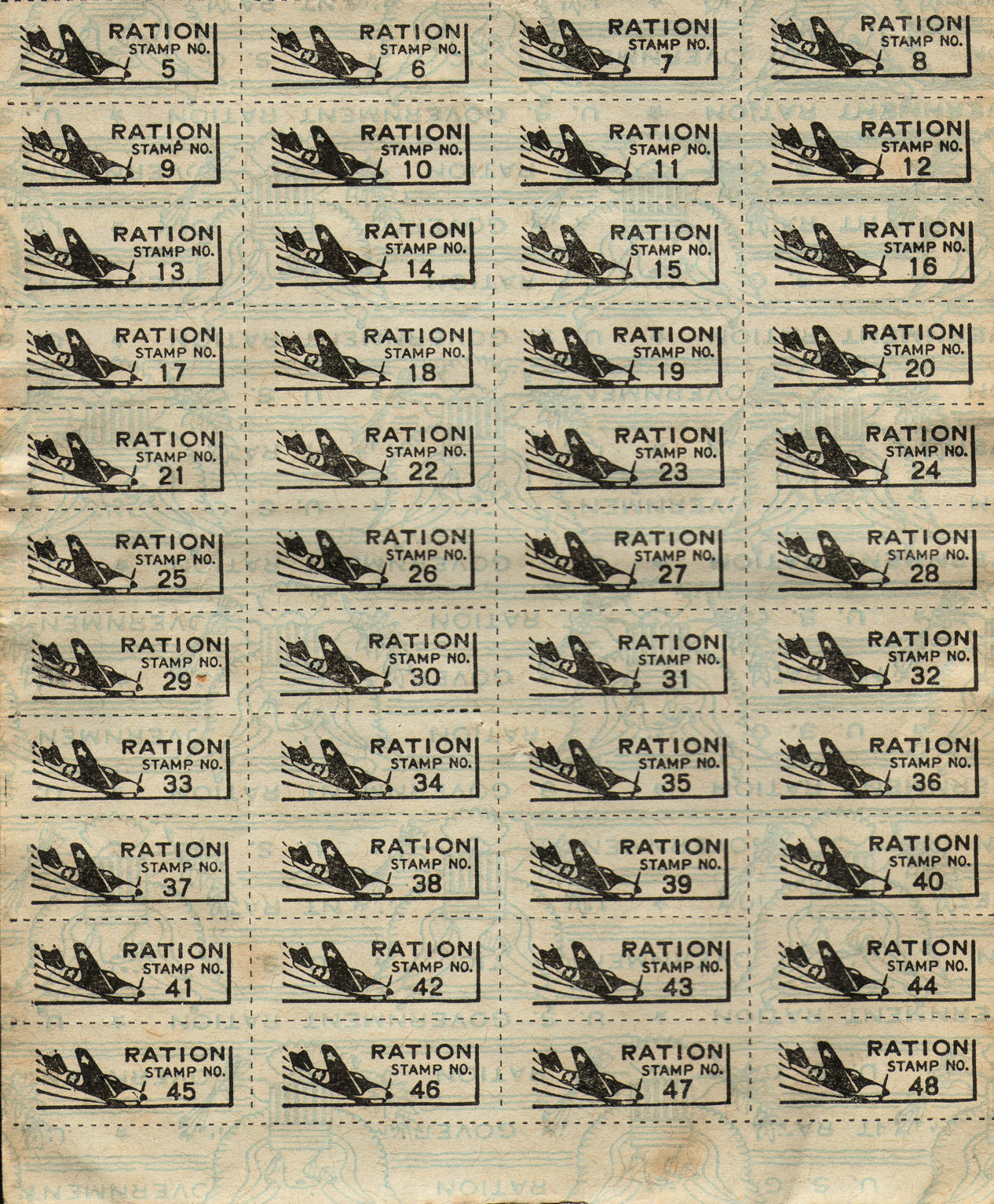
Fighter plane ration stamp

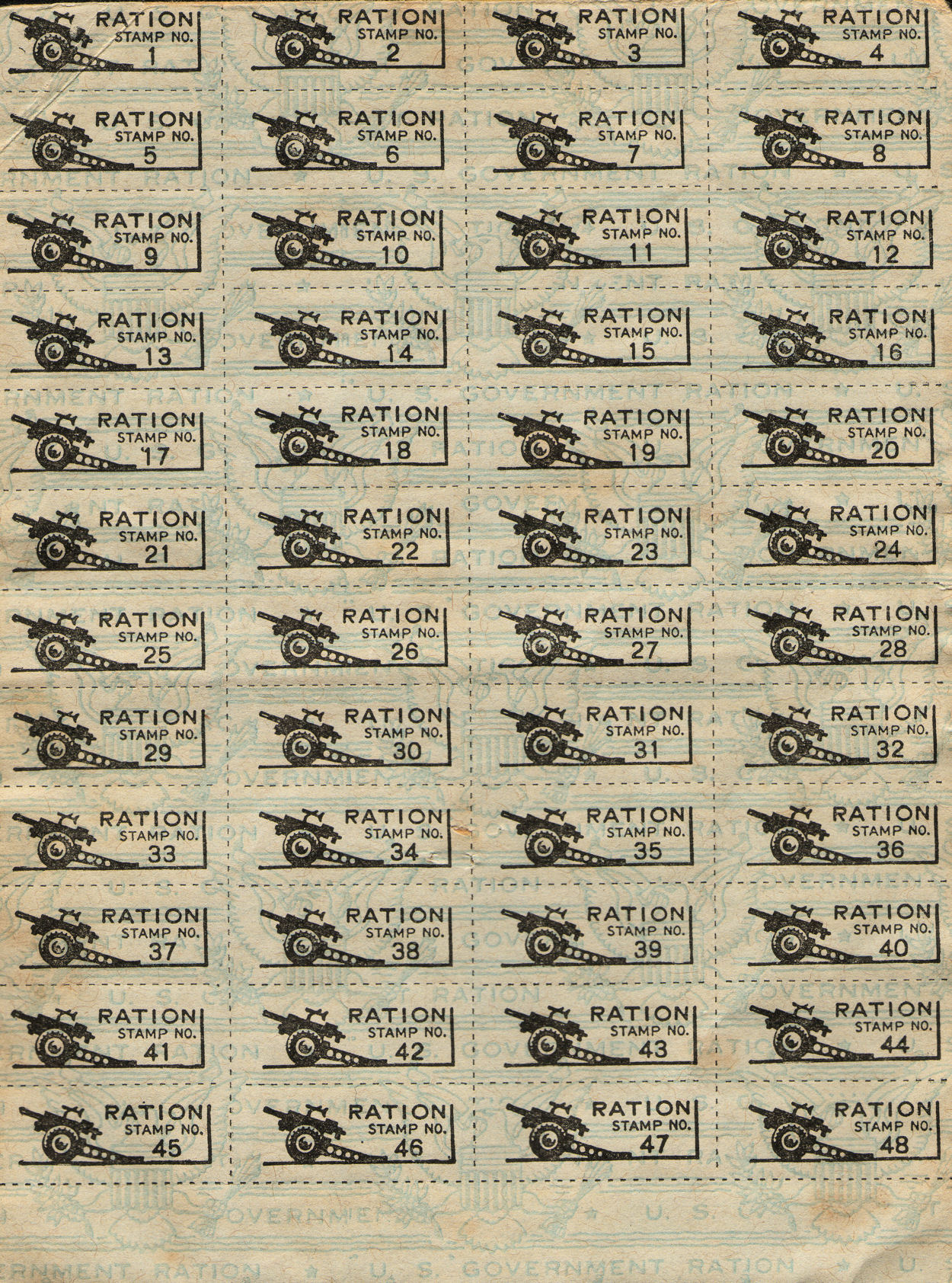
Artillery ration stamp

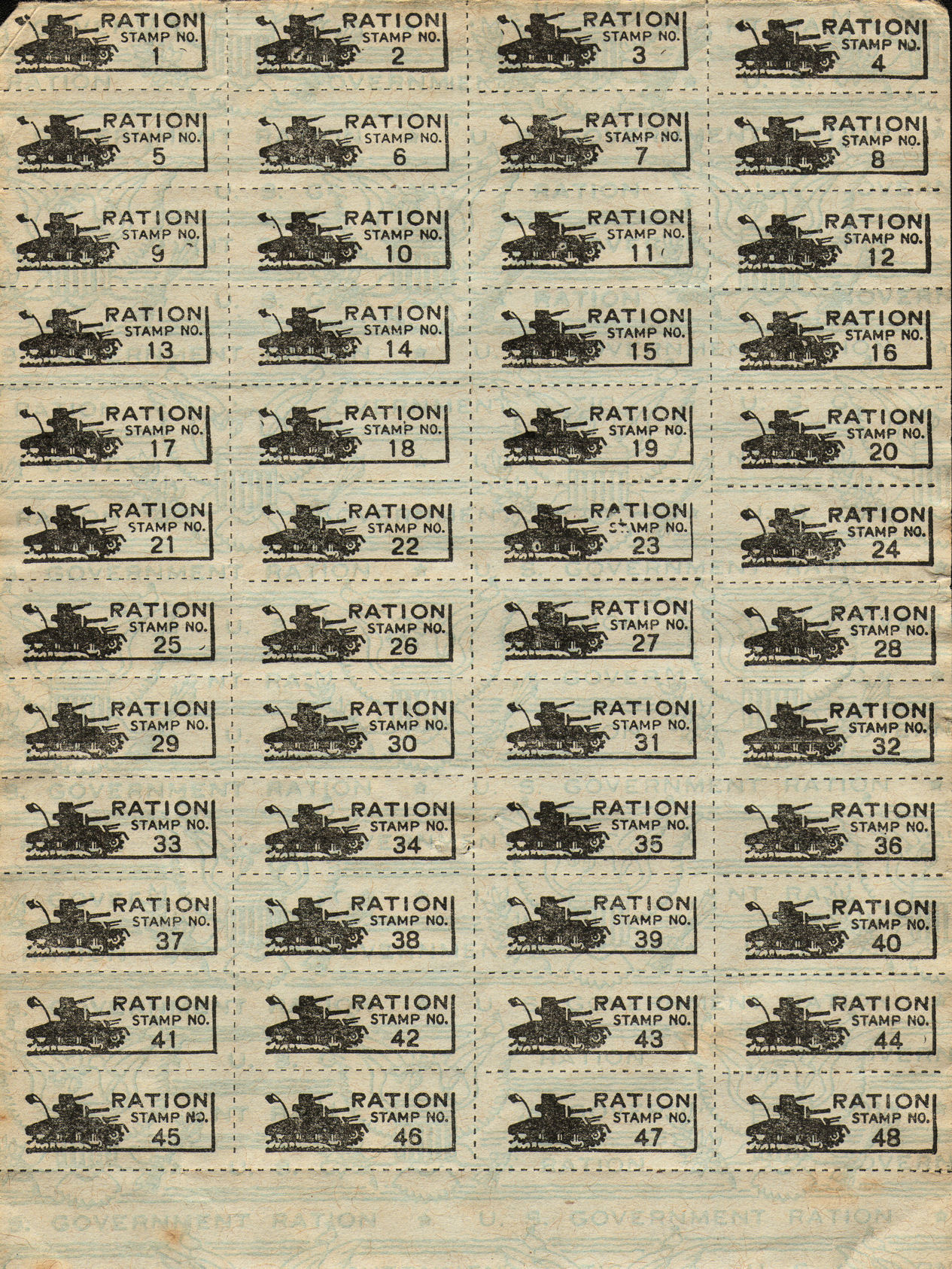
Tank ration stamp

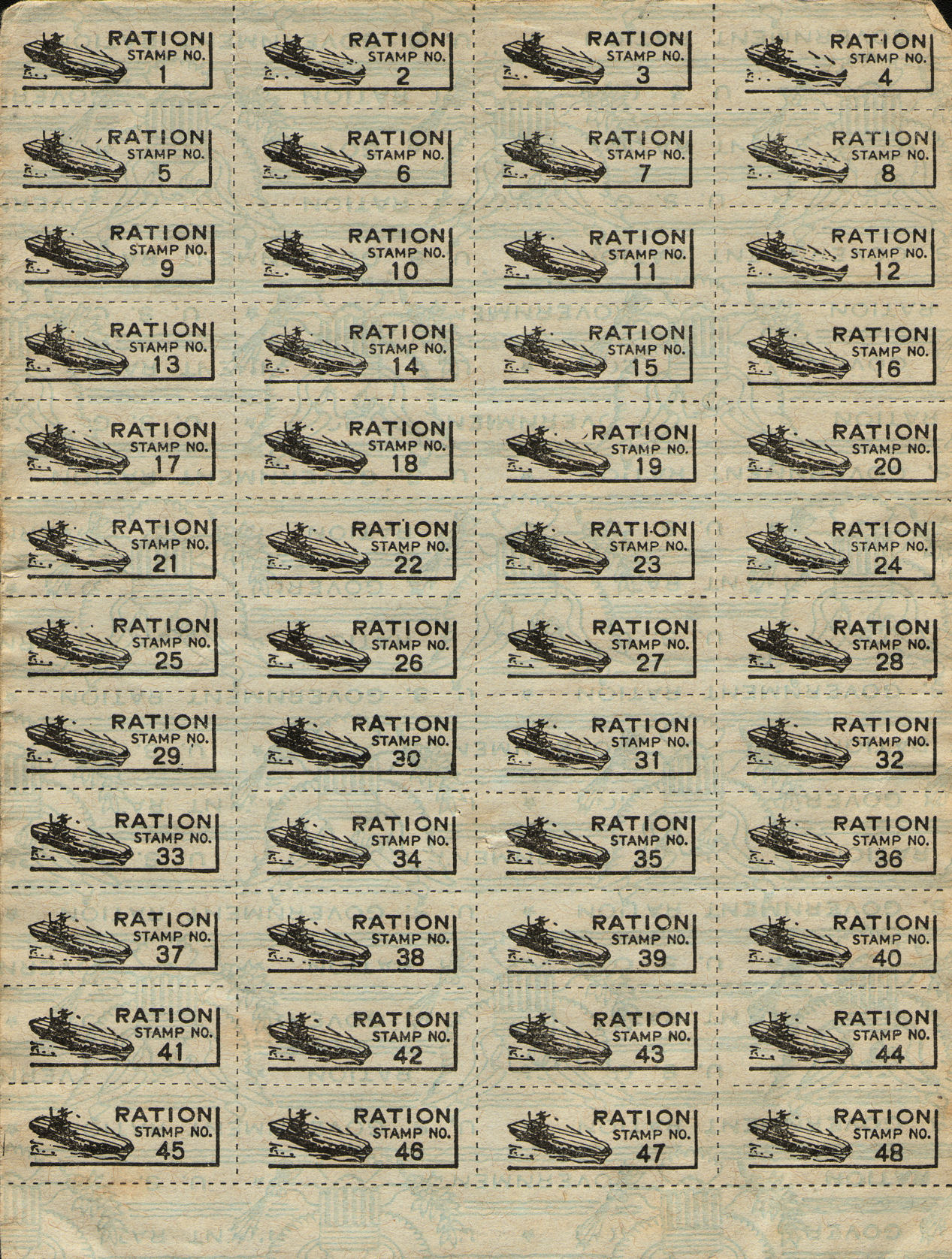
Aircraft Carrier ration stamp

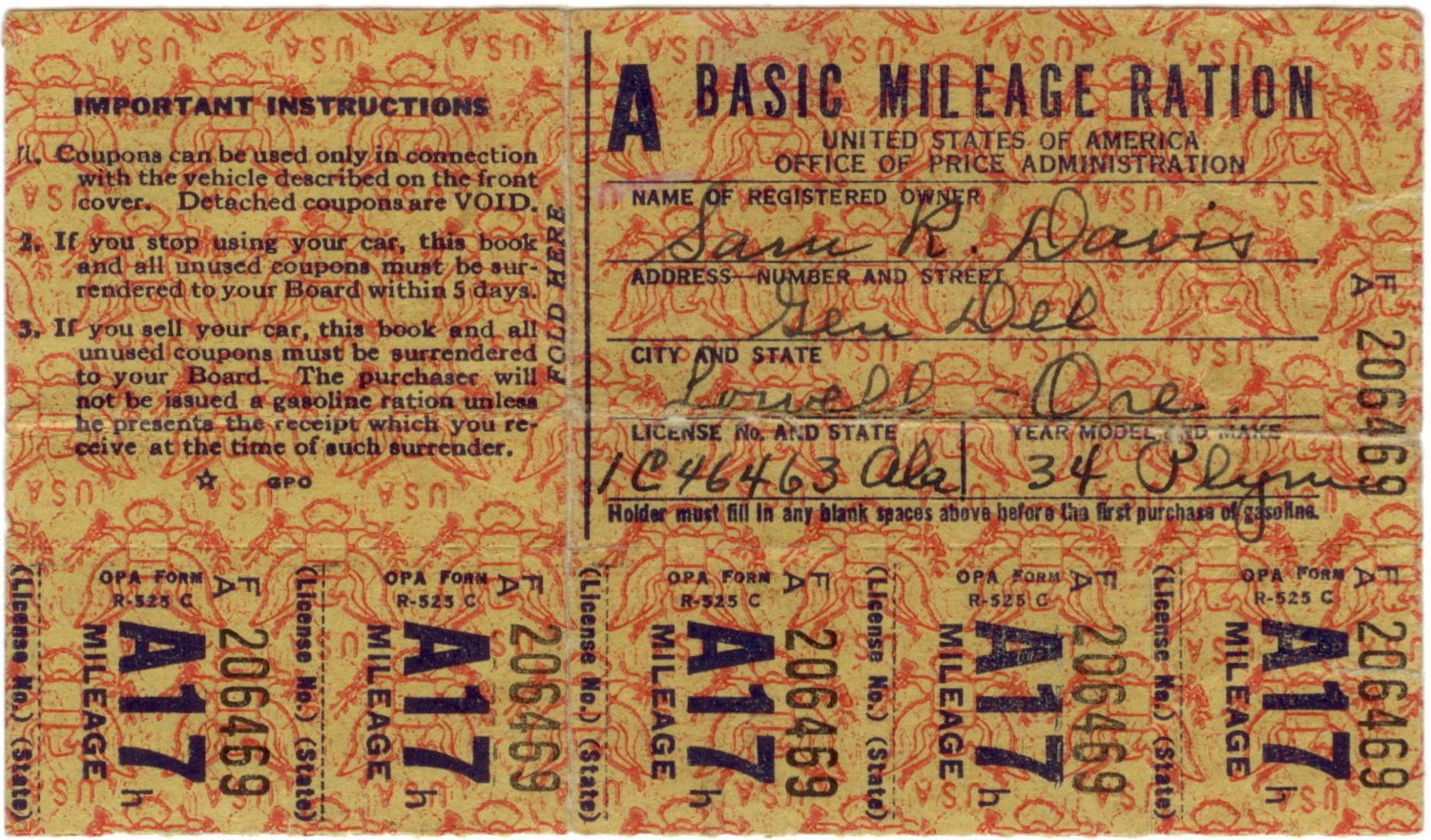
Basic mileage ration stamps for 1934 Plymouth

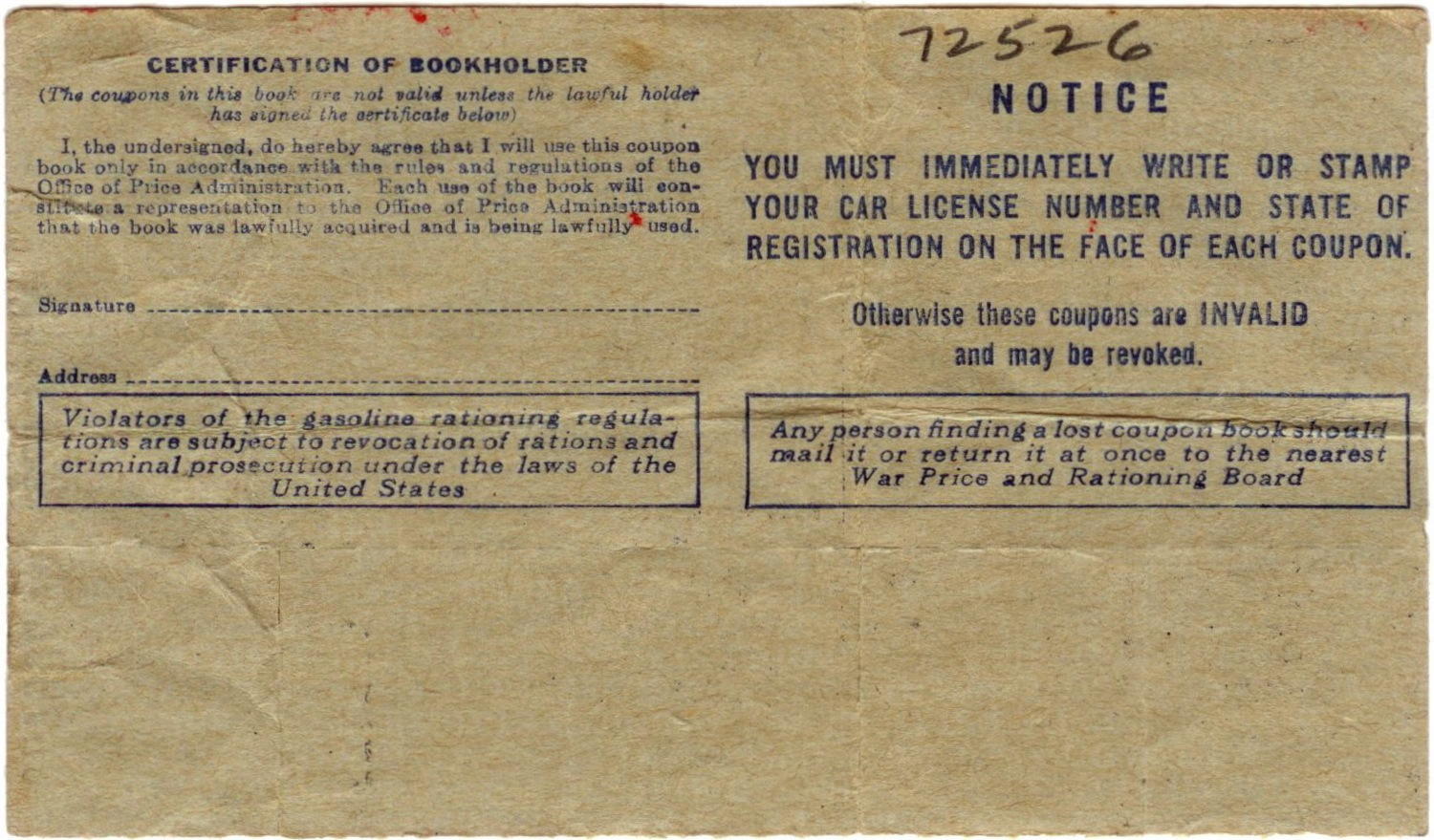
Back of mileage stamps

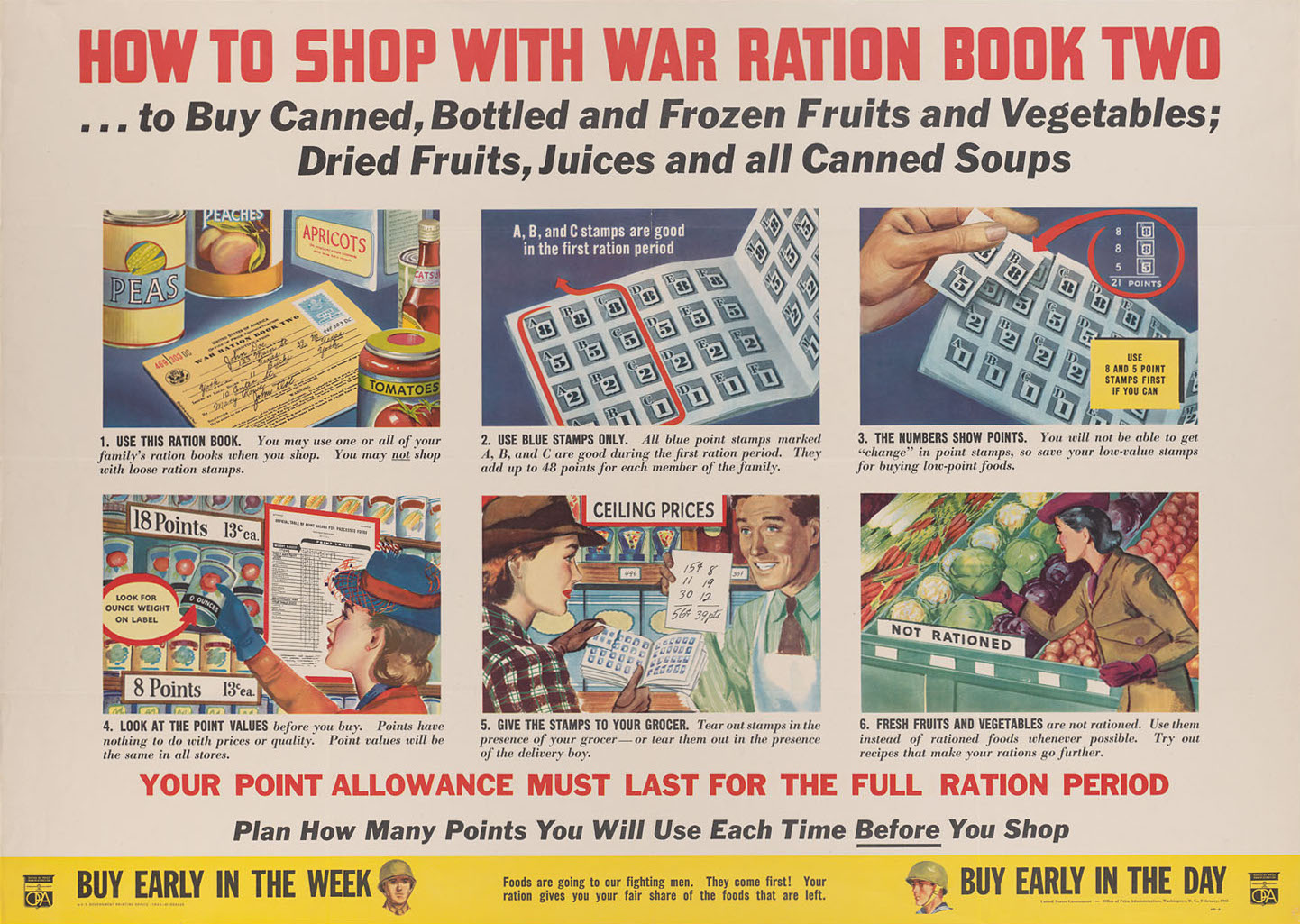
"How to Shop With Ration Book Two", 1943 poster

== See also ==
- Rationing
- Rationing in the United Kingdom
- Ration stamp
