= List of Terrytoons animated shorts =

This is a list of animated short films produced by Terrytoons from 1929 to 1968 and released theatrically. Terrytoons co-founder Paul Terry was active until 1955 when the studio was sold to CBS. The list includes cartoons originally produced for television that were later screened in theaters from 1959 to 1975. The list does not include cartoons produced by Paul Terry before the founding of Terrytoons, such as Aesop's Fables and cartoons he produced while working at Van Beuren Studios.

== Preservation ==
French Fried was preserved and restored by the UCLA Film & Television Archive from a 35mm nitrate composite dupe negative. Restoration funding was provided by ASIFA-Hollywood. The restoration had its world premiere at the 2024 UCLA Festival of Preservation.

== 1930s ==
=== 1930 ===
No.	Title	Release	Director	Distributor	Film	Notes
1	Caviar	February 23, 1930	Frank Moser	Educational Pictures		Released in France and its colonies by Jacques Haïk as Placide moujik.
2	Pretzels	March 9, 1930	Frank Moser	Educational Pictures		Released in France and its colonies by Jacques Haïk as Placide amoureux.
3	Spanish Onions	March 23, 1930	Frank Moser	Educational Pictures		Released in France and its colonies by Jacques Haïk as Placide toreador.
4	Indian Pudding	April 6, 1930	Frank Moser	Educational Pictures		
5	Roman Punch	April 20, 1930	Frank Moser	Educational Pictures		
6	Hot Turkey	May 4, 1930	Frank Moser	Educational Pictures	This Cartoon Was Released On The Same Day As Hawaiian Pineapples	Released in France and its colonies by Jacques Haïk as Placide au Sérail.
7	Hawaiian Pineapples	May 4, 1930	Frank Moser	Educational Pictures	This Cartoon Was Released On The Same Day As Hot Turkey	Released in France and its colonies by Jacques Haïk as Placide aviateur.
8	Swiss Cheese	May 18, 1930	Frank Moser	Educational Pictures		
9	Codfish Balls	June 1, 1930	Frank Moser	Educational Pictures		
10	Hungarian Goulash	June 15, 1930	Frank Moser	Educational Pictures	Features Original Titles	Released in France and its colonies by Jacques Haïk as Placide bohéme.
11	Bully Beef	July 13, 1930	Frank Moser	Educational Pictures		Released in France and its colonies by Jacques Haïk as Placide s'en va-t-en Guerre.
12	Kangaroo Steak	July 27, 1930	Frank Moser	Educational Pictures		
13	Monkey Meat	August 10, 1930	Frank Moser	Educational Pictures		
14	Chop Suey	August 24, 1930	Frank Moser	Educational Pictures	Warning: Features Racist Imagery	Released in France and its colonies by Jacques Haïk as Les Chinoiseries de Placide. Not seen on television due to Chinese stereotypes.
15	French Fried	September 7, 1930	Frank Moser	Educational Pictures		First short to feature Farmer Al Falfa.
16	Dutch Treat	September 21, 1930	Frank Moser	Educational Pictures		Aired on Arte Cartoon Factory as Holland Days (German: Holländische Impressionen).
17	Irish Stew	October 5, 1930	Frank Moser	Educational Pictures		
18	Fried Chicken	October 19, 1930	Frank Moser	Educational Pictures	Lost	Believed lost
19	Jumping Beans	November 2, 1930	Frank Moser	Educational Pictures		
20	Scotch Highball	November 16, 1930	Frank Moser	Educational Pictures		
21	Salt Water Taffy	November 30, 1930	Frank Moser & Paul Terry	Educational Pictures	Features Original Titles	Released in France and its colonies by Jacques Haïk as Placide Marin.
22	Golf Nuts	December 14, 1930	Frank Moser	Educational Pictures		Released in France and its colonies by Jacques Haïk as Placide aux Enfers.
23	Pigskin Capers	December 28, 1930	Frank Moser	Educational Pictures		

=== 1931 ===
No.	Title	Release	Director	Distributor	Notes
24	Popcorn	January 11, 1931	Frank Moser	Educational Pictures	
25	Club Sandwich	January 25, 1931	Frank Moser	Educational Pictures	Features Farmer Al Falfa. Edited for television.
26	Razzberries	February 8, 1931	Frank Moser	Educational Pictures	Features Farmer Al Falfa
27	Go West, Big Boy	February 22, 1931	Frank Moser	Educational Pictures	
28	Quack, Quack	March 8, 1931	Frank Moser	Educational Pictures	
29	The Explorer	March 22, 1931	Frank Moser	Educational Pictures	Features Farmer Al Falfa
30	Clowning	April 5, 1931	Frank Moser	Educational Pictures	
31	Sing, Sing Prison	April 19, 1931	Frank Moser	Educational Pictures	
32	The Fireman's Bride	May 3, 1931	Frank Moser	Educational Pictures	Believed lost.
33	The Sultan's Cat	May 17, 1931	Frank Moser	Educational Pictures	Features Farmer Al Falfa. Believed lost.
34	A Day To Live	May 31, 1931	Frank Moser	Educational Pictures	Believed lost.
35	2000 B.C	June 14, 1931	Frank Moser	Educational Pictures	
36	Blues	June 28, 1931	Frank Moser	Educational Pictures	
37	By The Sea	July 12, 1931	Frank Moser	Educational Pictures	
38	Her First Egg	July 26, 1931	Frank Moser	Educational Pictures	
39	Jazz Mad	August 9, 1931	Frank Moser	Educational Pictures	Features Farmer Al Falfa
40	Canadian Capers	August 23, 1931	Frank Moser	Educational Pictures	Features Farmer Al Falfa
41	Jesse And James	September 6, 1931	Frank Moser	Educational Pictures	
42	The Champ	September 20, 1931	Frank Moser	Educational Pictures	Features Farmer Al Falfa
43	Around The World	October 4, 1931	Frank Moser	Educational Pictures	Believed lost.
44	Jingle Bells	October 18, 1931	Frank Moser	Educational Pictures	Believed lost.
45	The Black Spider	November 1, 1931	Frank Moser	Educational Pictures	
46	China	November 15, 1931	Frank Moser	Educational Pictures	Believed lost.
47	The Lorelei	November 29, 1931	Frank Moser	Educational Pictures	
48	Summertime	December 13, 1931	Frank Moser	Educational Pictures	
49	Aladdin's Lamp	December 27, 1931	Frank Moser	Educational Pictures	

=== 1932 ===
No.	Title	Release	Director	Distributor	Film	Notes
50	The Villain's Curse	January 10, 1932	Frank Moser	Educational Pictures	Copyright renewed.	Believed lost.
51	Noah's Outing	January 24, 1932	Frank Moser	Educational Pictures		Features Farmer Al Falfa. In the public domain due to a lack of renewal.
52	The Spider Talks	February 7, 1932	Frank Moser	Educational Pictures	Copyright renewed.	Negative exists at the British Film Institute.
53	Peg Leg Pete	February 21, 1932	Frank Moser	Educational Pictures	Copyright renewed.	Not to be confused with Terrytoon's later cartoon “Peg Leg Pete, The Pirate”.
54	Play Ball	March 6, 1932	Frank Moser	Educational Pictures	Copyright renewed.	A 16mm safety print exists via a videotape copy at UCLA Film & Television Archive.
55	Ye Olde Songs	March 20, 1932	Frank Moser	Educational Pictures	Copyright renewed.	Features Farmer Al Falfa
56	Bull-ero	April 3, 1932	Frank Moser	Educational Pictures	Copyright renewed.	
57	Radio Girl	April 17, 1932	Frank Moser	Educational Pictures	Copyright renewed.	
58	Woodland	May 1, 1932	Frank Moser	Educational Pictures	Copyright renewed.	Features Farmer Al Falfa
59	Romance	May 15, 1932	Frank Moser	Educational Pictures	Copyright renewed.	
60	Bluebeard's Brother	May 29, 1932	Frank Moser	Educational Pictures	Copyright renewed.	
61	Farmer Al Falfa's Bedtime Story	June 12, 1932	Frank Moser	Educational Pictures	Copyright renewed.	Incorrectly named sometimes as just “Bedtime Story”.
62	The Mad King	June 26, 1932	Frank Moser	Educational Pictures	Copyright renewed.	
63	Cocky Cockroach	July 10, 1932	Frank Moser	Educational Pictures	Copyright renewed.	
64	Spring Is Here	July 24, 1932	Frank Moser	Educational Pictures	Copyright renewed.	Features Farmer Al Falfa.
65	Farmer Al Falfa's Ape Girl	August 7, 1932	Frank Moser	Educational Pictures	Copyright renewed.	
66	Sherman Was Right	August 21, 1932	Frank Moser	Educational Pictures	Copyright renewed.	
67	Burlesque	September 4, 1932	Frank Moser	Educational Pictures	Copyright renewed.	
68	Southern Rhythm	September 18, 1932	Frank Moser	Educational Pictures	Copyright renewed.	Believed lost.
69	Farmer Al Falfa's Birthday Party	October 2, 1932	Frank Moser	Educational Pictures	Copyright renewed.	
70	College Spirit	October 16, 1932	Frank Moser	Educational Pictures	Copyright renewed.	
71	Hook and Ladder No. 1	October 30, 1932	Frank Moser	Educational Pictures	Copyright renewed.	
72	The Forty Thieves	November 13, 1932	Frank Moser	Educational Pictures	Copyright renewed.	
73	Toyland	November 27, 1932	Frank Moser	Educational Pictures	Copyright renewed.	
74	Hollywood Diet	December 11, 1932	Frank Moser	Educational Pictures	Copyright renewed.	
75	Ireland Or Bust	December 25, 1932	Frank Moser	Educational Pictures	Copyright renewed.	

=== 1933 ===
No.	Title	Release	Director	Distributor	Film	Notes
76	Jealous Lover	January 8, 1933	Frank Moser	Educational Pictures	Copyright renewed.	
77	Robin Hood	January 22, 1933	Frank Moser	Educational Pictures	Copyright renewed.	
78	Hansel And Gretel	February 5, 1933	Frank Moser	Educational Pictures	Copyright renewed.	
79	The Tale Of A Shirt	February 19, 1933	Frank Moser	Educational Pictures	Copyright renewed.	
80	Down On The Levee	March 5, 1933	Frank Moser	Educational Pictures	Copyright renewed.	
81	Who Killed Cock Robin	March 19, 1933	Frank Moser	Educational Pictures	Copyright renewed.	
82	Oh! Susanna	April 2, 1933	Frank Moser	Educational Pictures	Copyright renewed.	
83	Romeo And Juilet	April 16, 1933	Frank Moser	Educational Pictures	Copyright renewed.	Based on the classic tale of the same name.
84	Pirate Ship	April 30, 1933	Frank Moser	Educational Pictures	Copyright renewed.	
85	Tropical Fish	May 14, 1933	Frank Moser	Educational Pictures	Copyright renewed.	Features Farmer Al Falfa.
86	Cinderella	May 28, 1933	Frank Moser	Educational Pictures	Copyright renewed.	
87	King Zilch	June 11, 1933	Frank Moser	Educational Pictures	Copyright renewed.	The first appearance of reoccurring character "Zilch" who would make appearances in more Terrytoons in the future.
88	The Banker's Daughter	June 25, 1933	Frank Moser	Educational Pictures	Copyright renewed.	The first of 5 "Fanny Zilch" cartoons and was Paul Terry's first experiment on television like episode plots.
89	The Oil Can Mystery	July 9, 1933	Frank Moser	Educational Pictures	Copyright renewed.	A Fanny Zilch Cartoon.
90	Fanny In The Lion's Den	July 23, 1933	Frank Moser	Educational Pictures	Copyright renewed.	A Fanny Zilch Cartoon.
91	Hypnotic Eyes	August 1, 1933	Frank Moser	Educational Pictures	Copyright renewed.	A Fanny Zilch Cartoon.
92	Grand Uproar	August 25, 1933	Frank Moser	Educational Pictures	Copyright renewed.	
93	Pick-Necking	September 8, 1933	Frank Moser	Educational Pictures	Copyright renewed.	A Farmer Al Falfa Cartoon.
94	Fanny's Wedding Day	September 22, 1933	Frank Moser	Educational Pictures	Copyright renewed.	The Last Fanny Zilch Cartoon.
95	A Gypsy Fiddler	October 6, 1933	Frank Moser	Educational Pictures	Copyright renewed.	
96	Beanstalk Jack	October 20, 1933	Frank Moser	Educational Pictures	Copyright renewed.	
97	The Village Blacksmith	November 3, 1933	Frank Moser	Educational Pictures	Copyright renewed.	Features Farmer Al Falfa.
98	Robinson Crusoe	November 17, 1933	Frank Moser	Educational Pictures		Features Farmer Al Falfa. In the public domain due to a lack of copyright renewal.
99	Little Boy Blue	November 30, 1933	Frank Moser	Educational Pictures	Copyright renewed.	
100	In Venice	December 15, 1933	Frank Moser	Educational Pictures	Copyright renewed.	
101	The Sunny South	December 29, 1933	Frank Moser	Educational Pictures	Copyright renewed.	Believed lost.

=== 1934 ===
No.	Title	Release	Director	Distributor	Notes
102	Holland Days	January 12, 1934	Frank Moser & Paul Terry	Educational Pictures	Features Farmer Al Falfa.
103	The Three Bears	January 26, 1934	Frank Moser & Paul Terry	Educational Pictures	Was remade in 1939.
104	Rip Van Winkle	February 9, 1934	Frank Moser & Paul Terry	Educational Pictures	Features Farmer Al Falfa.
105	The Last Straw	February 23, 1934	Frank Moser & Paul Terry	Educational Pictures	
106	The Owl and the Pussycat	March 9, 1934	Frank Moser & Paul Terry	Educational Pictures	Features Farmer Al Falfa.
107	A Mad House	March 23, 1934	Frank Moser & Paul Terry	Educational Pictures	
108	Joe's Lunch Wagon	April 6, 1934	Frank Moser & Paul Terry	Educational Pictures	
109	Just A Clown	April 20, 1934	Frank Moser & Paul Terry	Educational Pictures	
110	The King's Daughter	May 4, 1934	Frank Moser & Paul Terry	Educational Pictures	
111	The Lion's Friend.	May 18, 1934	Frank Moser & Paul Terry	Educational Pictures	
112	Pandora	June 1, 1934	Frank Moser & Paul Terry	Educational Pictures	
113	Slow But Sure	June 15, 1934	Frank Moser & Paul Terry	Educational Pictures	
114	See The World	June 29, 1934	Frank Moser & Paul Terry	Educational Pictures	
115	My Lady's Garden	July 13, 1934	Frank Moser & Paul Terry	Educational Pictures	
116	Irish Sweepstakes	July 27, 1934	Frank Moser & Paul Terry	Educational Pictures	
117	Busted Blossoms	August 10, 1934	Frank Moser	Educational Pictures	
118	Mice In Council	August 24, 1934	Frank Moser & Paul Terry	Educational Pictures	
119	Why Mules Leave Home	September 7, 1934	Frank Moser & Paul Terry	Educational Pictures	Features Farmer Al Falfa.
120	Jail Birds	September 21, 1934	Frank Moser & Paul Terry	Educational Pictures	
121	The Black Sheep	October 5, 1934	Frank Moser	Educational Pictures	
122	The Magic Fish	October 19, 1934	Frank Moser & Paul Terry	Educational Pictures	
123	Hot Sands	November 2, 1934	Frank Moser & Paul Terry	Educational Pictures	
124	Tom, Tom The Piper's Son	November 16, 1934	Frank Moser & Paul Terry	Educational Pictures	
125	Jack's Shack	November 30, 1934	Frank Moser & Paul Terry	Educational Pictures	Features Farmer Al Falfa.
126	South Pole Or Bust	December 14, 1934	Frank Moser & Paul Terry	Educational Pictures	
127	The Dog Show	December 28, 1934	Frank Moser & Paul Terry	Educational Pictures	

=== 1935 ===
No.	Title	Release	Director	Distributor	Notes
128	The First Snow	January 11, 1935	Frank Moser & Paul Terry	Educational Pictures	
129	What A Night	January 25, 1935	Frank Moser & Paul Terry	Educational Pictures	Features Farmer Al Falfa
130	The Bull Fight	February 8, 1935	Frank Moser & Paul Terry	Educational Pictures	The foirst cartoon that featured Puddy The Pup.
131	Fireman, Save My Child	February 22, 1935	Frank Moser & Paul Terry	Educational Pictures	
132	The Moth And The Spider	March 8, 1935	Frank Moser & Paul Terry	Educational Pictures	
133	Old Dog Tray	March 21, 1935	Frank Moser & Paul Terry	Educational Pictures	Features Farmer Al Falfa.
134	Flying Oil	April 5, 1935	Frank Moser & Paul Terry	Educational Pictures	Features Farmer Al Falfa
135	Five Puplets	April 19, 1935	Frank Moser & Paul Terry	Educational Pictures	
136	Peg Leg Pete, The Pirate	May 3, 1935	Frank Moser & Paul Terry	Educational Pictures	
137	A Modern Red Riding Hood	May 17, 1935	Frank Moser & Paul Terry	Educational Pictures	Commonly misnamed as “Modern Red Hood”.
138	Opera Night	May 31, 1935	Frank Moser & Paul Terry	Educational Pictures	
139	King Looney XIV	June 14, 1935	Frank Moser & Paul Terry	Educational Pictures	
140	Moans and Groans	June 28, 1935	Frank Moser & Paul Terry	Educational Pictures	Features Farmer Al Falfa.
141	Amateur Night	July 5, 1935	Frank Moser & Paul Terry	Educational Pictures	A negative exists at UCLA Film & Television Archive.
142	The Foxy-Fox	July 19, 1935	Frank Moser & Paul Terry	Educational Pictures	
143	Chain Letters	July 26, 1935	Frank Moser & Paul Terry	Educational Pictures	A negative exists at UCLA Film & Television Archive.
144	Birdland	August 23, 1935	Frank Moser & Paul Terry	Educational Pictures	
145	Circus Days	September 6, 1935	Frank Moser & Paul Terry	Educational Pictures	
146	Hey Diddle Diddle	September 20, 1935	Frank Moser & Paul Terry	Educational Pictures	
147	Foiled Again	October 4, 1935	Frank Moser	Educational Pictures	Fanny Zilch made a brief comeback in this cartoon.
148	Football	October 18, 1935	Frank Moser & Paul Terry	Educational Pictures	
149	A June Bride	November 1, 1935	Frank Moser & Paul Terry	Educational Pictures	Features Farmer Al Falfa
150	Aladdin's Lamp	November 15, 1935	Frank Moser & Paul Terry	Educational Pictures	Believed lost.
151	Southern Horse - Pitality	November 29, 1935	Frank Moser & Paul Terry	Educational Pictures	
152	Ye Olde Toy Shop	December 13, 1935	Frank Moser & Paul Terry	Educational Pictures	
153	The Mayflower	December 27, 1935	Frank Moser & Paul Terry	Educational Pictures	

=== 1936 ===
No.	Title	Release	Director	Distributor	Notes
154	The Feud	January 10, 1936	Frank Moser & Paul Terry	Educational Pictures	
155	The 19th Hole Club	January 24, 1936	Frank Moser & Paul Terry	Educational Pictures	Features Farmer Al Falfa
156	Home Town Olympics	February 7, 1936	Frank Moser & Paul Terry	Educational Pictures	Features Farmer Al Falfa.
157	The Alpine Yodeler	February 21, 1936	Frank Moser & Paul Terry	Educational Pictures	Features Farmer Al Falfa.
158	Barnyard Amateurs	March 6, 1936	Frank Moser & Paul Terry	Educational Pictures	Features Farmer Al Falfa.
159	Off To China	March 20, 1936	Frank Moser & Paul Terry	Educational Pictures	
160	The Western Trail	April 3, 1936	Frank Moser & Paul Terry	Educational Pictures	Features Farmer Al Falfa.
161	A Wolf In Cheap Clothing	April 17, 1936	Frank Moser	Educational Pictures	
162	Rolling Stones	May 1, 1936	Frank Moser	Educational Pictures	Features Farmer Al Falfa.
163	The Runt	May 15, 1936	Frank Moser	Educational Pictures	Features Farmer Al Falfa.
164	The Busy Bee	May 29, 1936	Frank Moser	Educational Pictures	
165	The Sailor's Home	June 12, 1936	Frank Moser & Paul Terry	Educational Pictures	
166	A Tough Egg	June 26, 1936	Mannie Davis, George Gordon & Paul Terry	Educational Pictures	
167	The Hot Spell	July 10, 1936	Mannie Davis & George Gordon	Educational Pictures	Features Farmer Al Falfa.
168	Puddy Pup and the Gypies	July 24, 1936	Mannie Davis & George Gordon	Educational Pictures	
169	Farmer Al Falfa's Prize Package	July 31, 1936	Mannie Davis & George Gordon	Educational Pictures	Features Farmer Al Falfa.
170	Kiko And The Honey Bears	August 21, 1936	Mannie Davis & George Gordon	Educational Pictures	First solo Kiko cartoon.
171	The Health Farm	September 4, 1936	Mannie Davis & George Gordon	Educational Pictures	Features Farmer Al Falfa.
172	A Bully Frog	September 18, 1936	Mannie Davis & George Gordon	Educational Pictures	
173	Kiko Foils The Fox	October 2, 1936	Mannie Davis & George Gordon	Educational Pictures	
174	Sunken Treasures	October 16, 1936	Mannie Davis & George Gordon	Educational Pictures	
175	A Battle Royal	October 30, 1936	Mannie Davis & George Gordon	Educational Pictures	Features Farmer Al Falfa.
176	An Arrow Escape	November 13, 1936	Mannie Davis & George Gordon	Educational Pictures	
177	Farmer Al Falfa's 20th Anniversary	November 27, 1936	Mannie Davis & George Gordon	Educational Pictures	Was made to celebrate Farmer Al Falfa's 20th anniversary since hs first appearance in 1916.
178	Cats In The Bag	December 11, 1936	Mannie Davis & George Gordon	Educational Pictures	Features Puddy The Pup.
179	Skunked Again	December 25, 1936	Mannie Davis & George Gordon	Educational Pictures	Features Kiko The Kangaroo.

=== 1937 ===
No.	Title	Release	Director	Distributor	Notes
180	Salty Mcguire	January 8, 1937	Mannie Davis & George Gordon	Educational Pictures	
181	The Tin Can Tourist	January 22, 1937	Mannie Davis & George Gordon	Educational Pictures	Features Farmer Al Falfa & Puddy The Pup.
182	The Book Shop	February 5, 1937	Mannie Davis & George Gordon	Educational Pictures	Features Puddy The Pup.
183	The Big Game Hunt	February 19, 1937	Mannie Davis & George Gordon	Educational Pictures	Features Farmer Al Falfa.
184	Red Hot Music	March 5, 1937	Mannie Davis & George Gordon	Educational Pictures	Features Kiko The Kangaroo.
185	Flying South	March 19, 1937	Mannie Davis & George Gordon	Educational Pictures	Features Farmer Al Falfa.
186	The Hay Ride	April 2, 1937	Mannie Davis & George Gordon	Educational Pictures	Features Kiko The Kangaroo.
187	Bug Carnival	April 16, 1937	Mannie Davis & George Gordon	Educational Pictures	
188	School Birds	April 30, 1937	Mannie Davis & George Gordon	Educational Pictures	
189	Puddy's Coronation	May 14, 1937	Mannie Davis & George Gordon	Educational Pictures	Features Puddy The Pup and Kiko The Kangaroo.
190	Ozzie Ostrich Comes To Town	May 28, 1937	Mannie Davis & George Gordon	Educational Pictures	Features Kiko The Kangaroo and Ozzie Ostrich.
191	Play Ball	June 11, 1937	Mannie Davis & George Gordon	Educational Pictures	Features Kiko The Kangaroo.
192	The Mechanical Cow	June 25, 1937	Paul Terry & Jack Zander	Educational Pictures	Features Farmer Al Falfa.
193	Pink Elephants	July 9, 1937	George Gordon	Educational Pictures	Features Farmer Al Falfa.
194	The Homeless Pup	July 23, 1937	George Gordon	Educational Pictures	Features Puddy The Pup.
195	The Paper Hangers	July 30, 1937	Mannie Davis	Educational Pictures	
196	Trailer Life	August 20, 1937	Mannie Davis & George Gordon	Educational Pictures	Features Farmer Al Falfa.
197	The Villain Still Pursued Her	September 3, 1937	Connie Rasinski	Educational Pictures	Features Oil Can Harry.
198	Kiko's Cleaning Day	September 17, 1937	George Gordon	Educational Pictures	Features Kiko The Kangaroo and Ozzie Ostrich.
199	A Close Shave	October 1, 1937	Mannie Davis	Educational Pictures	Features Farmer Al Falfa.
200	The Dancing Bear	October 15, 1937	John Foster	Educational Pictures	
201	The Saw Mill Mystery	October 29, 1937	Connie Rasinski & Paul Terry	Educational Pictures	Features Zanny Filch.
202	The Dog And The Bone	November 12, 1937	George Gordon	Educational Pictures	Features Puddy The Pup.
203	The Timid Rabbit	November 26, 1937	Mannie Davis	Educational Pictures	Released by Castle Films from 1947 - 1949.
204	The Billy Goat's Whiskers	December 10, 1937	John Foster	Educational Pictures	Features Farmer Al Falfa.
205	Barnyard Boss	December 24, 1937	Connie Rasinski	Educational Pictures	

=== 1938 ===
No.	Title	Release	Director	Distributor	Notes
206	The Lion Hunt	January 7, 1938	Mannie Davis	Educational Pictures	
207	Bugs Beetle And His Orchestra	January 21, 1938	John Foster & Paul Terry	Educational Pictures	
208	His Off Day	February 4, 1938	Connie Rasinski	Educational Pictures	Features Puddy The Pup.
209	Just Ask Jupiter	February 18, 1938	Mannie Davis	Educational Pictures	
210	Gandy The Goose	March 4, 1938	John Foster	Educational Pictures	The debut appearance of Gandy Goose.
211	Happy and Lucky	March 18, 1938	Connie Rasinski	Educational Pictures	Features Puddy The Pup.
212	A Mountain Romance	April 1, 1938	Mannie Davis	Educational Pictures	
213	Robinson Crusoe's Broadcast	April 15, 1938	John Foster	Educational Pictures	
214	Maid In China	April 29, 1938	Connie Rasinski	Educational Pictures	
215	The Big Top	May 12, 1938	Mannie Davis	Educational Pictures	Features Puddy The Pup.
216	Devil Of The Deep	May 27, 1938	John Foster	Educational Pictures	
217	Here's To Good Old Jail	June 10, 1938	Eddie Donnelly	Educational Pictures	
218	The Last Indian	June 24, 1938	Connie Rasinski	Educational Pictures	
219	Milk For Baby	July 8, 1938	Mannie Davis	Educational Pictures	
220	Mrs. O'Leary's Cow	July 22, 1938	Eddie Donnelly	Educational Pictures	
221	Eliza Runs Again	July 29, 1938	Connie Rasinski	Educational Pictures	Final cartoon to be released by Educational Pictures. Was reworked as "Eliza on the Ice" with Mighty Mouse from 1944. Negatives exist at the British Film Institute and the National Film & Sound Archive of Australia.
222	Chris Columbo	August 12, 1938	Eddie Donnelly	20th Century Fox	First cartoon to be released by 20th Century Fox.
223	String Bean Jack	August 26, 1938	John Foster	20th Century Fox	A remake of the 1933 Cartoon "Beanstalk Jack". First Terrytoon in Technicolor.
224	The Goose Flies High	September 9, 1938	John Foster	20th Century Fox	
225	The Wolf's Side Of The Story	September 23, 1938	Connie Rasinski	20th Century Fox	
226	The Glass Slipper	October 7, 1938	Mannie Davis	20th Century Fox	
227	The Newcomer	October 21, 1938	Mannie Davis	20th Century Fox	
228	The Stranger Rides Again	November 4, 1938	Mannie Davis	20th Century Fox	Remade as "The Mysterious Cowboy" in 1952. A negative exists at the UCLA Film & Television Archive.
229	Housewife Herman	November 18, 1938	Eddie Donnelly	20th Century Fox	
230	The Village Blacksmith	December 2, 1938	Mannie Davis	20th Century Fox	Remade as "Time Gallops On" in 1952. A negative exists at the British Film Institute.
231	Doomsday	December 16, 1938	Connie Rasinski	20th Century Fox	Features Gandy The Goose.
232	The Frame-Up	December 30, 1938	Connie Rasinski	20th Century Fox	Features Gandy The Goose.

=== 1939 ===
	Title	Release	Director	Distributor	Notes
233	The Owl and the Pussycat	January 13, 1939	Eddie Donnelly & Connie Rasinski	20th Century Fox	A remake of the 1934 cartoon of the same name. The first cartoon to feature Sourpuss who originally appeared ginger, but was later recolored to black and was used in Terrytoons appearing with Gandy Goose until the late 1940s.
234	One Gun Gary In Nick of Time	January 27, 1939	Eddie Donnelly & Connie Rasinski	20th Century Fox	
235	The Three Bears	February 10, 1939	Mannie Davis & Connie Rasinski	20th Century Fox	A remake of the 1934 cartoon of the same name.
236	Frozen Feet	February 24, 1939	Connie Rasinski	20th Century Fox	
237	G-Man Jitters	March 10, 1939	Eddie Donnelly & Connie Rasinski	20th Century Fox	Features Gandy Goose.
238	The Nutty Network	March 24, 1939	Mannie Davis	20th Century Fox	
239	The Cuckoo Bird	April 7, 1939	Mannie Davis & Connie Rasinski	20th Century Fox	
240	Their Last Bean	April 21, 1939	Eddie Donnelly & Connie Rasinski	20th Century Fox	
241	Barnyard Egg-Citement	May 5, 1939	Connie Rasinski	20th Century Fox	
242	Nick's Coffee Pot	May 19, 1939	Connie Rasinski	20th Century Fox	
243	The Prize Guest	June 2, 1939	Mannie Davis & Connie Rasinski	20th Century Fox	
244	A Bully Romance	June 16, 1939	Eddie Donnelly	20th Century Fox	Features Gandy Goose.
245	Africa Squawks	June 30, 1939	Connie Rasinski	20th Century Fox	
246	Barnyard Baseball	July 14, 1939	Mannie Davis & Connie Rasinski	20th Century Fox	Features Gandy Goose.
247	The Old Fire Horse	July 28, 1939	Eddie Donnelly & Connie Rasinski	20th Century Fox	Was once considered lost but was later rediscovered by cartoon98100 in 2023. Remade as "Smokey Joe" from 1945.
248	The Two-Headed Giant	August 11, 1939	Connie Rasinski	20th Century Fox	
249	The Golden West	August 25, 1939	Mannie Davis & Connie Rasinski	20th Century Fox	
250	Hook, Line and Sinker	September 8, 1939	Eddie Donnelly	20th Century Fox	The first cartoon to feature Gandy Goose and Sourpuss together.
251	Sheep In The Meadow	September 22, 1939	Mannie Davis & Connie Rasinski	20th Century Fox	
252	The Orphan Duck	October 6, 1939	Connie Rasinski	20th Century Fox	The first cartoon to feature Dinky Duck.
253	The Watchdog	October 20, 1939	Connie Rasinski	20th Century Fox	
254	One Mouse In A Million	November 3, 1939	Connie Rasinski	20th Century Fox	
255	A Wicky Wacky Romance	November 17, 1939	Mannie Davis & Connie Rasinski	20th Century Fox	
256	The Hitch-Hiker	December 1, 1939	Eddie Donnelly & Connie Rasinski	20th Century Fox	Features Gandy Goose.
257	The Ice Pond	December 15, 1939	Mannie Davis	20th Century Fox	Features Oscar the Timid Pig
258	The First Robin	December 29, 1939	Connie Rasinski	20th Century Fox	

== 1940s ==
=== 1940 ===
No.	Series	Title	Release	Director	Distributor	Notes
259	—N/a	A Dog In A Mansion	January 12, 1940	Eddie Donnelly	20th Century Fox	
260	—N/a	Edgar Runs Again	January 26, 1940	Mannie Davis	20th Century Fox	
261	—N/a	Harvest Time	February 9, 1940	Connie Rasinski	20th Century Fox	
262	—N/a	Hare and Hounds	February 23, 1940	Eddie Donnelly	20th Century Fox	
263	—N/a	All's Well That Ends Well	March 8, 1940	Mannie Davis	20th Century Fox	
264	—N/a	Much Ado About Nothing	March 22, 1940	Connie Rasinski	20th Century Fox	Features Dinky Duck.
265	—N/a	It Must Be Love	April 5, 1940	Connie Rasinski	20th Century Fox	Features Gandy Goose.
266	—N/a	Just A Little Bull	April 19, 1940	Eddie Donnelly	20th Century Fox	
267	—N/a	Wots All the Shootin' Fer	May 3, 1940	Volney White	20th Century Fox	
268	—N/a	Swiss Ski Yodelers	May 17, 1940	Eddie Donnelly	20th Century Fox	Features Oscar the Timid Pig.
269	—N/a	Catnip Capers	May 31, 1940	Mannie Davis	20th Century Fox	
270	—N/a	Professor Offkeyski	June 14, 1940	Connie Rasinski	20th Century Fox	Remade in 1947 as "One Note Tony". A negative exists at the British Film Institute.
271	—N/a	Rover's Rescue	June 28, 1940	Volney White	20th Century Fox	
272	—N/a	Rupert the Runt	July 12, 1940	Mannie Davis	20th Century Fox	
273	—N/a	Love In A Cottage	July 28, 1940	Volney White	20th Century Fox	
274	—N/a	Billy Mouse's Akwakade	August 9, 1940	Eddie Donnelly	20th Century Fox	
275	—N/a	Club Life In the Stone Age	August 23, 1940	Mannie Davis	20th Century Fox	
276	—N/a	The Lucky Ducky	September 6, 1940	Connie Rasinski	20th Century Fox	Features Dinky Duck.
277	—N/a	Touchdown Demons	September 20, 1940	Volney White	20th Century Fox	
278	—N/a	How Wet Was My Ocean	October 4, 1940	Eddie Donnelly	20th Century Fox	Features Oscar the Timid Pig and Sourpuss.
279	—N/a	Happy Hunting Grounds	October 18, 1940	Mannie Davis	20th Century Fox	Features Oscar the Timid Pig. Remade as "Seeing Ghosts" in 1948. A negative exists at the UCLA Film & Television Archive.
280	—N/a	Landing of the Pilgrims	November 1, 1940	Connie Rasinski	20th Century Fox	
281	—N/a	The Magic Pencil	November 15, 1940	Volney White	20th Century Fox	Features Gandy Goose and Sourpuss.
282	—N/a	Plane Goofy	November 29, 1940	Eddie Donnelly	20th Century Fox	Features Farmer Al Falfa. The first appearance of Farmer Al Falfa in color.
283	—N/a	The Snow Man	December 13, 1940	Mannie Davis	20th Century Fox	
284	—N/a	The Temperamental Lion	December 27, 1940	Connie Rasinski	20th Century Fox	Features Looey the Lion.

=== 1941 ===
No.	Series	Title	Release	Director	Distributor	Notes
285	—N/a	What A Little Sneeze Will Do	January 10, 1941	Eddie Donnelly	20th Century Fox	Features Oscar the Timid Pig.
286	—N/a	Hairless Hector	January 24, 1941	Volney White	20th Century Fox	
287	—N/a	Mississippi Swing	February 7, 1941	Connie Rasinski	20th Century Fox	
288	—N/a	Fishing Made Easy	February 21, 1941	Eddie Donnelly	20th Century Fox	Features Sourpuss.
289	—N/a	The Home Guard	March 7, 1941	Mannie Davis	20th Century Fox	Features Gandy Goose.
290	—N/a	When Knights Were Bold	March 21, 1941	Volney White	20th Century Fox	
291	—N/a	The Baby Seal	April 10, 1941	Connie Rasinski	20th Century Fox	Remade as "Flipper Frolics" from 1952.
292	—N/a	Uncle Joey	April 18, 1941	Mannie Davis	20th Century Fox	
293	—N/a	A Dog's Dream	May 2, 1941	Eddie Donnelly	20th Century Fox	
294	—N/a	The Magic Shell	May 16, 1941	Mannie Davis	20th Century Fox	Remade as "Seaside Adventures" in 1952. A negative exists at the British Film Institute.
295	—N/a	What Happens At Night	May 30, 1941	Connie Rasinski	20th Century Fox	
296	—N/a	Horsefly Opera	June 13, 1941	Eddie Donnelly	20th Century Fox	
297	—N/a	Good Old Irish Tunes	June 27, 1941	Connie Rasinski	20th Century Fox	Features Gandy Goose. Remade as "Songs of Erin" in 1951. A negative exists at the British Film Institute.
298	—N/a	Bringing Home the Bacon	July 11, 1941	Mannie Davis	20th Century Fox	
299	—N/a	Twelve O'clock and All Ain't Well	July 25, 1941	Eddie Donnelly	20th Century Fox	
300	—N/a	The Old Oaken Bucket	August 8, 1941	Connie Rasinski	20th Century Fox	
301	—N/a	The Ice Carnival	August 22, 1941	Eddie Donnelly	20th Century Fox	
302	—N/a	The One-Man Navy	September 5, 1941	Mannie Davis	20th Century Fox	Features Gandy Goose.
303	—N/a	Uncle Joey Comes To Town	September 19, 1941	Mannie Davis	20th Century Fox	
304	—N/a	Welcome Little Stranger	October 3, 1941	Connie Rasinski	20th Century Fox	Features Dinky Duck.
305	—N/a	The Frozen North	October 17, 1941	Connie Rasinski	20th Century Fox	
306	—N/a	Slap Happy Hunters	October 31, 1941	Eddie Donnelly	20th Century Fox	Features Gandy Goose and Sourpuss.
307	—N/a	Back to the Soil	November 14, 1941	Eddie Donnelly	20th Century Fox	Features Oscar the Timid Pig.
308	—N/a	The Bird Tower	November 28, 1941	Mannie Davis	20th Century Fox	
309	—N/a	A Yarn About Yarn	December 12, 1941	Connie Rasinski	20th Century Fox	
310	—N/a	Flying Fever	December 26, 1941	Mannie Davis	20th Century Fox	Features Gandy Goose.

=== 1942 ===
No.	Series	Title	Release	Director	Distributor	Notes
311	—N/a	A Torrid Toreador	January 9, 1942	Eddie Donnelly	20th Century Fox	Features Sourpuss.
312	—N/a	Happy Circus Days	January 23, 1942	Connie Rasinski	20th Century Fox	
313	—N/a	Funny Bunny Business	February 6, 1942	Eddie Donnelly	20th Century Fox	Features Farmer Al Falfa. Remade as "Hounding the Hares" from 1948.
314	—N/a	Cat Meets Mouse	February 20, 1942	Mannie Davis	20th Century Fox	
315	—N/a	Eat Me Kitty, Eight to the Bar	March 6, 1942	Mannie Davis	20th Century Fox	
316	—N/a	Sham Battle Shenanigans	March 20, 1942	Connie Rasinski	20th Century Fox	Features Gandy Goose and Sourpuss.
317	—N/a	Oh, Gentle Spring	April 3, 1942	Connie Rasinski	20th Century Fox	
318	Gandy Goose	Lights Out	April 17, 1942	Eddie Donnelly	20th Century Fox	Co-starring Sourpuss.
319	—N/a	Tricky Business	May 1, 1942	Eddie Donnelly	20th Century Fox	Features Gandy Goose and Sourpuss.
320	—N/a	Neck and Neck	May 15, 1942	Mannie Davis	20th Century Fox	A negative exists at the British Film Institute.
321	—N/a	The Stork's Mistake	May 29, 1942	Eddie Donnelly	20th Century Fox	
322	—N/a	All About Dogs	June 12, 1942	Connie Rasinski	20th Century Fox	
323	—N/a	Wilful Willie	June 26, 1942	Connie Rasinski	20th Century Fox	
324	—N/a	The Outpost	July 10, 1942	Mannie Davis	20th Century Fox	Features Gandy Goose and Sourpuss. The First cartoon featuring Gandy Goose & Sourpuss to have a World War 2 theme. A negative exists at the UCLA Film & Television Archive.
325	—N/a	Tire Trouble	July 24, 1942	Eddie Donnelly	20th Century Fox	Features Gandy Goose.
326	Nancy	Doing Their Bit	August 3, 1942	Connie Rasinski	20th Century Fox	First of two cartoons featuring Nancy, character from United Features Syndicate comics.
327	—N/a	All Out for 'V'	August 7, 1942	Mannie Davis	20th Century Fox	
328	The Lucky Duck	Life with Fido	August 21, 1942	Connie Rasinski	20th Century Fox	Features Dinky Duck credited as The Lucky Duck.
329	—N/a	The Big Build-Up	September 4, 1942	Mannie Davis	20th Century Fox	Features Puddy the Pup.
330	Nancy	School Daze	September 18, 1942	Eddie Donnelly	20th Century Fox	Last Terrytoons cartoon to feature Nancy.
331	—N/a	Night Life in the Army	October 12, 1942	Mannie Davis	20th Century Fox	Features Gandy Goose.
332	Super Mouse	The Mouse of Tomorrow	October 16, 1942	Eddie Donnelly	20th Century Fox	The first appearance of Super Mouse later renamed Mighty Mouse.
333	—N/a	Ickle Meets Pickle	November 6, 1942	Connie Rasinski	20th Century Fox	The last short film produced in black and white by Terrytoons.
334	Super Mouse	Frankenstein's Cat	November 27, 1942	Mannie Davis	20th Century Fox	
335	—N/a	Barnyard WAAC	December 11, 1942	Eddie Donnelly	20th Century Fox	
336	—N/a	Somewhere in the Pacific	December 25, 1942	Mannie Davis	20th Century Fox	A negative exists at the British Film Institute.

=== 1943 ===
No.	Series	Title	Release	Director	Distributor	Notes
337	Gandy Goose	Scrap For Victory	January 22, 1943	Connie Rasinski	20th Century Fox	
338	Super Mouse	He Dood It Again	February 5, 1943	Eddie Donnelly	20th Century Fox	
339	Gandy Goose	Barnyard Blackout	March 5, 1943	Mannie Davis	20th Century Fox	
340	—N/a	Shipyard Symphony	March 19, 1943	Eddie Donnelly	20th Century Fox	
341	—N/a	Patriotic Pooches	April 9, 1943	Connie Rasinski	20th Century Fox	A negative exists at the British Film Institute.
342	Gandy Goose	The Last Roundup	May 14, 1943	Mannie Davis	20th Century Fox	
343	—N/a	Keep ‘em Growing	May 28, 1943	Mannie Davis	20th Century Fox	
344	Super Mouse	Pandora’s Box	June 11, 1943	Connie Rasinski	20th Century Fox	
345	—N/a	Mopping Up	June 25, 1943	Eddie Donnelly	20th Century Fox	Features Gandy Goose And Sourpuss. A negative exists at the UCLA Film & Television Archive.
346	Super Mouse	Super Mouse Rides Again	August 6, 1943	Mannie Davis	20th Century Fox	
347	—N/a	Camouflage	August 27, 1943	Eddie Donnelly	20th Century Fox	Features Gandy Goose and Sourpuss. A negative exists at the UCLA Film & Television Archive.
348	Gandy Goose	Somewhere In Egypt	September 17, 1943	Mannie Davis	20th Century Fox	
349	Super Mouse	Down With Cats	October 7, 1943	Connie Rasinski	20th Century Fox	
350	—N/a	Aladdin's Lamp	October 22, 1943	Eddie Donnelly	20th Century Fox	Features Gandy Goose and Sourpuss.
351	—N/a	The Lion and the Mouse	November 12, 1943	Mannie Davis	20th Century Fox	Features Super Mouse. Remake Of The 1934 Cartoon "The Lion's Friend".
352	—N/a	Yokel Duck Makes Good	November 26, 1943	Eddie Donnelly	20th Century Fox	
353	—N/a	The Hopeful Donkey	December 17, 1943	Mannie Davis	20th Century Fox	

=== 1944 ===
No.	Series	Title	Release	Director	Distributor	Notes
354	Mighty Mouse	The Wreck of the Hesperus	February 11, 1944	Mannie Davis	20th Century Fox	The first cartoon to name Mighty Mouse as such.
355	—N/a	The Butcher of Seville	January 7, 1944	Eddie Donnelly	20th Century Fox	
356	—N/a	The Helicopter	January 21, 1944	Eddie Donnelly	20th Century Fox	
357	—N/a	A Day In June	March 3, 1944	Eddie Donnelly	20th Century Fox	
358	Mighty Mouse	The Champion of Justice	March 17, 1944	Mannie Davis	20th Century Fox	
359	—N/a	The Frog and the Princess	April 7, 1944	Eddie Donnelly	20th Century Fox	Features Gandy Goose and Sourpuss.
360	Mighty Mouse	Mighty Mouse Meets Jekyll and Hyde Cat	April 28, 1944	Mannie Davis	20th Century Fox	
361	Mighty Mouse	Wolf! Wolf!	June 2, 1944	Mannie Davis	20th Century Fox	In the public domain due to a lack of copyright renewal.
362	—N/a	My Boy Johnny	May 12, 1944	Eddie Donnelly	20th Century Fox	
363	Mighty Mouse	The Green Line	July 7, 1944	Eddie Donnelly	20th Century Fox	
364	Mighty Mouse	Eliza On the Ice	June 16, 1944	Connie Rasinski	20th Century Fox	
365	—N/a	Carmen's Veranda	July 28, 1944	Mannie Davis	20th Century Fox	Features Gandy Goose and Sourpuss.
366	—N/a	The Cat Came Back	August 18, 1944	Connie Rasinski	20th Century Fox	Features Farmer Al Falfa.
367	Mighty Mouse	The Two Barbers	September 1, 1944	Eddie Donnelly	20th Century Fox	
368	Gandy Goose	The Ghost Town	September 22, 1944	Mannie Davis	20th Century Fox	
369	Mighty Mouse	The Sultan's Birthday	October 13, 1944	Bill Tytla	20th Century Fox	
370	—N/a	A Wolf's Tale	October 27, 1944	Connie Rasinski	20th Century Fox	Remake of the 1938 cartoon “The Wolf's Side Of The Story”
371	Mighty Mouse	At the Circus	November 17, 1944	Eddie Donnelly	20th Century Fox	
372	Gandy Goose	Gandy's Dream Girl	December 8, 1944	Mannie Davis	20th Century Fox	
373	—N/a	Dear Old Switzerland	December 22, 1944	Eddie Donnelly	20th Century Fox	Features Oscar the Timid Pig.

=== 1945 ===
No.	Series	Title	Release	Director	Distributor	Notes
374	Mighty Mouse	Mighty Mouse and the Pirates	January 12, 1945	Mannie Davis & Connie Rasinski	20th Century Fox	
375	Mighty Mouse	The Port of Missing Mice	February 2, 1945	Eddie Donnelly	20th Century Fox	
376	—N/a	Ants In Your Pantry	February 16, 1945	Mannie Davis	20th Century Fox	
377	Mighty Mouse	Raiding the Raiders	March 9, 1945	Connie Rasinski	20th Century Fox	
378	Gandy Goose	Post War Inventions	March 23, 1945	Connie Rasinski	20th Century Fox	
379	Gandy Goose	Fisherman's Luck	March 23, 1945	Eddie Donnelly	20th Century Fox	
380	Mighty Mouse	The Kilkenny Cats	April 13, 1945	Mannie Davis	20th Century Fox	
381	Gandy Goose	Mother Goose Nightmare	May 4, 1945	Connie Rasinski	20th Century Fox	
382	—N/a	Smoky Joe	May 25, 1945	Connie Rasinski	20th Century Fox	
383	Mighty Mouse	The Silver Streak	June 8, 1945	Eddie Donnelly	20th Century Fox	
384	Aesops Fable	The Mosquito	June 29, 1945	Mannie Davis	20th Century Fox	Features Gandy Goose and Sourpuss
385	Mighty Mouse	Mighty Mouse and the Wolf	July 20, 1945	Eddie Donnelly	20th Century Fox	
386	Mighty Mouse	Gypsy Life	August 3, 1945	Connie Rasinski	20th Century Fox	
387	Aesops Fable	The Fox and the Duck	August 24, 1945	Mannie Davis	20th Century Fox	
388	—N/a	Swooning the Swooners	September 14, 1945	Connie Rasinski	20th Century Fox	Features Farmer Al Falfa
389	Aesops Fable	The Watchdog	September 28, 1945	Eddie Donnelly	20th Century Fox	
390	Gandy Goose	Who's Who In the Jungle	October 19, 1945	Eddie Donnelly	20th Century Fox	
391	Mighty Mouse	Mighty Mouse Meets Bad Bill Bunion	November 9, 1945	Mannie Davis	20th Century Fox	
392	Gandy Goose	The Exterminator	November 23, 1945	Eddie Donnelly	20th Century Fox	
393	Mighty Mouse	Krakatoa	December 14, 1945	Connie Rasinski	20th Century Fox	

=== 1946 ===
No.	Series	Title	Release	Director	Distributor	Notes
394	—N/a	The Talking Magpies	January 4, 1946	Mannie Davis	20th Century Fox	Features Farmer Al Falfa and prototypes for Dimwit and Heckle & Jeckle. In the public domain due to a lack of copyright renewal.
395	Mighty Mouse	Svengali's Cat	January 18, 1946	Eddie Donnelly	20th Century Fox	
396	Gandy Goose	Fortune Hunters	February 8, 1946	Connie Rasinski	20th Century Fox	
397	Mighty Mouse	The Wicked Wolf	March 8, 1946	Mannie Davis	20th Century Fox	
398	Mighty Mouse	My Old Kentucky Home	March 29, 1946	Eddie Donnelly	20th Century Fox	
399	Gandy Goose	It's All In the Stars	April 12, 1946	Connie Rasinski	20th Century Fox	
400	Mighty Mouse	Throwing the Bull	May 3, 1946	Connie Rasinski	20th Century Fox	
401	Gandy Goose	The Golden Hen	May 24, 1946	Mannie Davis	20th Century Fox	
402	—N/a	Dinky Finds A Home	June 7, 1946	Eddie Donnelly	20th Century Fox	Features Dinky Duck
403	Mighty Mouse	The Johnstown Flood	June 28, 1946	Connie Rasinski	20th Century Fox	
404	Gandy Goose	Peace-Time Football	July 19, 1946	Mannie Davis	20th Century Fox	
405	Mighty Mouse	The Trojan Horse	July 26, 1946	Mannie Davis	20th Century Fox	
406	—N/a	The Tortoise Wins Again	August 9, 1946	Connie Rasinski	20th Century Fox	
407	Mighty Mouse	Winning the West	August 16, 1946	Eddie Donnelly	20th Century Fox	
408	Mighty Mouse	The Electronic Mouse Trap	September 6, 1946	Mannie Davis	20th Century Fox	
409	Mighty Mouse	The Jail Break	September 20, 1946	Mannie Davis	20th Century Fox	
410	—N/a	The Snow Man	October 11, 1946	Connie Rasinski	20th Century Fox	
411	—N/a	The Housing Problem	October 25, 1946	Mannie Davis	20th Century Fox	Features Oscar the Timid Pig.
412	Mighty Mouse	The Crackpot King	November 15, 1946	Eddie Donnelly	20th Century Fox	
413	—N/a	The Uninvited Pests	November 29, 1946	Connie Rasinski	20th Century Fox	Features Farmer Al Falfa. First appearance of Heckle & Jeckle.
414	Mighty Mouse	The Hep Cat	December 6, 1946	Mannie Davis	20th Century Fox	
415	—N/a	Beanstalk Jack	December 20, 1946	Eddie Donnelly	20th Century Fox	

=== 1947 ===
No.	Series	Title	Release	Director	Distributor	Notes
416	Mighty Mouse	Crying Wolf	January 10, 1947	Connie Rasinski	20th Century Fox	
417	Heckle & Jeckle	McDougal's Rest Farm	January 31, 1947	Mannie Davis	20th Century Fox	
418	Mighty Mouse	The Dead End Cats	February 14, 1947	Eddie Donnelly	20th Century Fox	
419	Heckle & Jeckle	Happy Go Lucky	February 28, 1947	Connie Rasinski	20th Century Fox	
420	Gandy Goose	Mexican Baseball	March 14, 1947	Mannie Davis	20th Century Fox	
421	Mighty Mouse	Aladdin's Lamp	March 28, 1947	Eddie Donnelly	20th Century Fox	
422	Heckle & Jeckle	Cat Trouble	April 11, 1947	Connie Rasinski	20th Century Fox	
423	Mighty Mouse	The Sky Is Falling	April 25, 1947	Mannie Davis	20th Century Fox	
424	Heckle & Jeckle	The Intruders	May 9, 1947	Eddie Donnelly	20th Century Fox	
425	Mighty Mouse	Mighty Mouse Meets Deadeye Dick	May 30, 1947	Connie Rasinski	20th Century Fox	
426	Heckle & Jeckle	Flying South	August 15, 1947	Mannie Davis	20th Century Fox	
427	Mighty Mouse	A Date For Dinner	August 29, 1947	Eddie Donnelly	20th Century Fox	
428	Heckle & Jeckle	Fishing By the Sea	September 19, 1947	Connie Rasinski	20th Century Fox	
429	Mighty Mouse	The First Snow	October 10, 1947	Mannie Davis	20th Century Fox	
430	—N/a	One Note Tony	October 22, 1947	Connie Rasinski	20th Century Fox	
431	Heckle and Jeckle	The Super Salesman	October 24, 1947	Eddie Donnelly	20th Century Fox	
432	Mighty Mouse	A Fight to the Finish	November 14, 1947	Connie Rasinski	20th Century Fox	
433	—N/a	The Wolf's Pardon	December 5, 1947	Eddie Donnelly	20th Century Fox	
434	Heckle & Jeckle	The Hitch Hikers	December 12, 1947	Connie Rasinski	20th Century Fox	
435	Mighty Mouse	Swiss Cheese Family Robinson	December 19, 1947	Mannie Davis	20th Century Fox	
436	Mighty Mouse	Lazy Little Beaver	December 26, 1947	Eddie Donnelly	20th Century Fox	

=== 1948 ===
No.	Series	Title	Release	Director	Distributor	Notes
437	Mighty Mouse	Mighty Mouse and the Magician	January 10, 1948	Eddie Donnelly	20th Century Fox	
438	Gandy Goose	The Chipper Chipmunk	March 9, 1948	Mannie Davis	20th Century Fox	
439	—N/a	Felix the Fox	March 10, 1948	Mannie Davis	20th Century Fox	Features Dimwit
440	Heckle and Jeckle	Taming the Cat	April 14, 1948	Connie Rasinski	20th Century Fox	Reissued in July of 1975
441	Mighty Mouse	The Feudin' Hillbillies	April 23, 1948	Connie Rasinski	20th Century Fox	
442	—N/a	Seeing Ghosts	June 1, 1948	Mannie Davis	20th Century Fox	Features Oscar the Timid Pig
443	—N/a	Hounding the Hares	June 9, 1948	Eddie Donnelly	20th Century Fox	Features Farmer Al Falfa
444	—N/a	Mystery In the Moonlight	June 14, 1948	Eddie Donnelly	20th Century Fox	
445	Heckle and Jeckle	A Sleepless Night	August 24, 1948	Connie Rasinski	20th Century Fox	Reissued in March of 1975
446	Mighty Mouse	The Witch's Cat	September 15, 1948	Mannie Davis	20th Century Fox	
447	—N/a	The Hard Boiled Egg	September 29, 1948	Connie Rasinski	20th Century Fox	Features Dingbat
448	Mighty Mouse	Triple Trouble	September 30, 1948	Eddie Donnelly	20th Century Fox	
449	Mighty Mouse	Love's Labor Won	October 15, 1948	Mannie Davis	20th Century Fox	
450	Heckle and Jeckle	Out Again In Again	November 1, 1948	Connie Rasinski	20th Century Fox	
451	Heckle and Jeckle	Magpie Madness	November 2, 1948	Eddie Donnelly	20th Century Fox	Reissue in September of 1975
452	Heckle and Jeckle	Free Enterprise	November 23, 1948	Mannie Davis	20th Century Fox	Reissued in December of 1975
453	Heckle and Jeckle	Gooney Golfers	December 1, 1948	Connie Rasinski	20th Century Fox	
454	Mighty Mouse	The Magic Slipper	December 2, 1948	Mannie Davis	20th Century Fox	
455	Mighty Mouse	The Mysterious Stranger	December 21, 1948	Mannie Davis	20th Century Fox	
456	Mighty Mouse	Racket Buster	December 26, 1948	Mannie Davis	20th Century Fox	
457	Heckle & Jeckle	The Power of Thought	December 31, 1948	Eddie Donnelly	20th Century Fox	Reissue in June of 1974
458	—N/a	The Wooden Indian	December 31, 1948	Connie Rasinski	20th Century Fox	

=== 1949 ===
No.	Series	Title	Release	Director	Distributor	Notes
459	—N/a	The Kitten Sitter	May 1, 1949	Eddie Donnelly	20th Century Fox	
460	Heckle & Jeckle	The Lion Hunt	May 13, 1949	Eddie Donnelly	20th Century Fox	
461	—N/a	Dingbat Land	May 27, 1949	Connie Rasinski	20th Century Fox	Features Gandy Goose, Sourpuss and Dingbat
462	—N/a	The Lyin' Lion	May 30, 1949	Connie Rasinski	20th Century Fox	Features Looey the Lion
463	Mighty Mouse	The Catnip Gang	June 2, 1949	Eddie Donnelly	20th Century Fox	
464	Heckle and Jeckle	Happy Landing	June 5, 1949	Mannie Davis	20th Century Fox	Also features Looey the Lion
465	Mighty Mouse	A Cold Romance	June 10, 1949	Mannie Davis	20th Century Fox	
466	Heckle and Jeckle	Hula Hula Land	June 22, 1949	Mannie Davis	20th Century Fox	
467	Heckle and Jeckle	The Stowaways	July 1, 1949	Connie Rasinski	20th Century Fox	
468	—N/a	The Covered Pushcart	August 26, 1949	Mannie Davis	20th Century Fox	Features Gandy Goose and Sourpuss
469	—N/a	Mrs. Jones' Rest Farm	October 12, 1949	Eddie Donnelly	20th Century Fox	Features Looey the Lion
470	—N/a	A Truckload of Trouble	October 25, 1949	Connie Rasinski	20th Century Fox	
471	Mighty Mouse	Perils of Pearl Pureheart	November 11, 1949	Eddie Donnelly	20th Century Fox	
472	Heckle and Jeckle	Dancing Shoes	November 11, 1949	Mannie Davis	20th Century Fox	
473	—N/a	Paint Pot Symphony	November 27, 1949	Connie Rasinski	20th Century Fox	
474	Mighty Mouse	Stop, Look, and Listen	December 1, 1949	Eddie Donnelly	20th Century Fox	
475	—N/a	Flying Cups and Saucers	December 2, 1949	Connie Rasinski	20th Century Fox	Features Dimwit
476	—N/a	Comic Book Land	December 23, 1949	Mannie Davis	20th Century Fox	Features Sourpuss paired with Gandy Goose. This cartoon also features cameo appearances of Dimwit, Heckle & Jeckle, and Mighty Mouse.

== 1950s ==
=== 1950 ===
No.	Series	Title	Release	Director	Distributor	Notes
477	Heckle & Jeckle	The Fox Hunt	February 17, 1950	Connie Rasinski	20th Century Fox	
478	Heckle & Jeckle	A Merry Chase	February 21, 1950	Mannie Davis	20th Century Fox	Reissued in 1976
479	Aesop's Fable	Foiling the Fox	March 11, 1950	Connie Rasinski	20th Century Fox	Features Dingbat
480	Victor The Volunteer	Better Late Than Never	March 17, 1950	Eddie Donnelly	20th Century Fox	
481	Dinky Duck	The Beauty Shop	April 28, 1950	Eddie Donnelly	20th Century Fox	
482	Mighty Mouse	Anti-Cats	May 19, 1950	Mannie Davis	20th Century Fox	
483	—N/a	The Dog Show	May 26, 1950	Eddie Donnelly	20th Century Fox	
484	Gandy Goose	Dream Walking	June 9, 1950	Connie Rasinski	20th Century Fox	Co-starring Sourpuss
485	Mighty Mouse	Law and Order	June 23, 1950	Eddie Donnelly	20th Century Fox	
486	—N/a	The Red-Headed Monkey	July 7, 1950	Mannie Davis	20th Century Fox	
487	Mighty Mouse	Beauty On the Beach	July 21, 1950	Connie Rasinski	20th Century Fox	
488	Dingbat	All This and Rabbit Stew	August 4, 1950	Connie Rasinski	20th Century Fox	
489	Little Roquefort	Cat Happy	August 18, 1950	Connie Rasinski	20th Century Fox	Also Features Percy the Cat
490	Little Roquefort	Mouse and Garden	September 1, 1950	Mannie Davis	20th Century Fox	Also Features Percy the Cat
491	—N/a	If Cats Could Sing	September 15, 1950	Eddie Donnelly	20th Century Fox	
492	Heckle & Jeckle	King Tut's Tomb	September 29, 1950	Mannie Davis	20th Century Fox	
493	Mighty Mouse	Mother Goose's Birthday Party	October 13, 1950	Connie Rasinski	20th Century Fox	
494	—N/a	Squirrel Crazy	October 15, 1950	Mannie Davis	20th Century Fox	Features Nutsy Squirrel
495	Gandy Goose	Wide Open Spaces	November 1, 1950	Eddie Donnelly	20th Century Fox	
496	Heckle & Jeckle	Rival Romeos	November 7, 1950	Eddie Donnelly	20th Century Fox	
497	Dingbat	Sour Grapes	November 22, 1950	Mannie Davis	20th Century Fox	
498	Little Roquefort	Three Is A Crowd	December 22, 1950	Connie Rasinski	20th Century Fox	
499	Half Pint	Stage Struck	December 24, 1950	Mannie Davis	20th Century Fox	
500	—N/a	Woodman, Spare That Tree	December 28, 1950	Eddie Donnelly	20th Century Fox	
501	Mighty Mouse	Sunny Italy	December 30, 1950	Connie Rasinski	20th Century Fox	

=== 1951 ===
No.	Series	Title	Release	Director	Distributor	Notes
502	Gandy Goose	Songs of Erin	February 25, 1951	Connie Rasinski	20th Century Fox	
503	Heckle & Jeckle	Bulldozing the Bull	March 11, 1951	Eddie Donnelly	20th Century Fox	
504	Gandy Goose	Spring Fever	March 18, 1951	Mannie Davis	20th Century Fox	
505	Mighty Mouse	Goons From the Moon	April 1, 1951	Connie Rasinski	20th Century Fox	
506	Little Roquefort	Musical Madness	April 11, 1951	Eddie Donnelly	20th Century Fox	Also features Percy
507	Half Pint	The Elephant Mouse	April 25, 1951	Mannie Davis	20th Century Fox	
508	Heckle & Jeckle	The Rainmakers	May 13, 1951	Connie Rasinski	20th Century Fox	
509	Mighty Mouse	Injun Trouble	May 23, 1951	Eddie Donnelly	20th Century Fox	
510	Little Roquefort	Seasick Sailors	May 30, 1951	Mannie Davis	20th Century Fox	
511	Terry Bears	Tall Timber Tale	June 6, 1951	Connie Rasinski	20th Century Fox	
512	—N/a	Golden Egg Goosie	June 13, 1951	Eddie Donnelly	20th Century Fox	
513	Mighty Mouse	A Swiss Miss	June 20, 1951	Mannie Davis	20th Century Fox	
514	Heckle & Jeckle	Steeple Jacks	June 27, 1951	Connie Rasinski	20th Century Fox	
515	Terry Bears	Little Problems	July 22, 1951	Eddie Donnelly	20th Century Fox	
516	Little Roquefort	Pastry Panic	July 25, 1951	Mannie Davis	20th Century Fox	
517	—N/a	The Helpful Geni	August 15, 1951	Connie Rasinski	20th Century Fox	Features Percy the Cat
518	Heckle & Jeckle	Sno Fun	August 22, 1951	Eddie Donnelly	20th Century Fox	
519	Mighty Mouse	A Cat's Tale	August 29, 1951	Mannie Davis	20th Century Fox	
520	—N/a	Beaver Trouble	September 2, 1951	Connie Rasinski	20th Century Fox	
521	Little Roquefort	Flop Secret	September 12, 1951	Eddie Donnelly	20th Century Fox	
522	Little Roquefort	The Haunted Cat	September 23, 1951	Eddie Donnelly	20th Century Fox	
523	Terry Bears	Papa's Little Helpers	October 31, 1951	Mannie Davis	20th Century Fox	
524	Heckle & Jeckle	Movie Madness	November 7, 1951	Connie Rasinski	20th Century Fox	Reissue in January of 1974
525	—N/a	Mechanical Bird	November 21, 1951	Eddie Donnelly	20th Century Fox	
526	Terry Bears	Papa's Day of Rest	December 8, 1951	Mannie Davis	20th Century Fox	
527	—N/a	Seaside Adventures	December 14, 1951	Mannie Davis	20th Century Fox	
528	Mighty Mouse	Prehistoric Perils	December 28, 1951	Connie Rasinski	20th Century Fox	
529	Little Roquefort	City Slicker	December 31, 1951	Mannie Davis	20th Century Fox	Also Features Percy

=== 1952 ===
No.	Series	Title	Release	Director	Distributor	Notes
530	Dinky Duck	Flat Foot Fledgling	January 25, 1952	Mannie Davis	20th Century Fox	
531	—N/a	Time Gallops On	February 1, 1952	Mannie Davis	20th Century Fox	
532	Heckle and Jeckle	Off to the Opera	February 22, 1952	Connie Rasinski	20th Century Fox	
533	—N/a	The Happy Cobblers	February 29, 1952	Eddie Donnelly	20th Century Fox	
534	Mighty Mouse	Hero For A Day	March 3, 1952	Mannie Davis	20th Century Fox	
535	Little Roquefort	Hypnotized	March 7, 1952	Mannie Davis	20th Century Fox	
536	Mighty Mouse	Hansel and Gretel	March 28, 1952	Connie Rasinski	20th Century Fox	
537	—N/a	Flipper Frolics	April 11, 1952	Connie Rasinski	20th Century Fox	
538	The Terry Bears	Little Anglers	May 2, 1952	Connie Rasinski	20th Century Fox	
539	Dinky Duck	The Foolish Duckling	May 16, 1952	Mannie Davis	20th Century Fox	
540	Heckle and Jeckle	House Busters	June 6, 1952	Connie Rasinski	20th Century Fox	
541	—N/a	The Mysterious Cowboy	July 4, 1952	Mannie Davis	20th Century Fox	
542	Little Roquefort	Good Mousekeeping	July 18, 1952	Mannie Davis	20th Century Fox	
543	The Terry Bears	Nice Doggy	July 25, 1952	Eddie Donnelly	20th Century Fox	
544	Mighty Mouse	Happy Holland	August 1, 1952	Eddie Donnelly	20th Century Fox	
545	Heckle and Jeckle	Moose On the Loose	August 22, 1952	Mannie Davis	20th Century Fox	Reissue in April of 1974
546	Dinky Duck	Sink Or Swim	August 29, 1952	Connie Rasinski	20th Century Fox	
547	Aesop's Fable	Happy Valley	September 1, 1952	Eddie Donnelly	20th Century Fox	
548	The Terry Bears	Picnic With Papa	September 26, 1952	Mannie Davis	20th Century Fox	
549	Mighty Mouse	A Soapy Opera	September 27, 1952	Connie Rasinski	20th Century Fox	
550	The Terry Bears	Thrifty Cubs	October 4, 1952	Mannie Davis	20th Century Fox	
551	Heckle and Jeckle	Hair Cut-Ups	October 11, 1952	Eddie Donnelly	20th Century Fox	
552	Little Roquefort	Mouse Meets Bird	November 15, 1952	Connie Rasinski	20th Century Fox	
553	The Terry Bears	Snappy Snap Shots	November 15, 1952	Eddie Donnelly	20th Century Fox	
554	Heckle and Jeckle	Pill Peddlers	December 13, 1952	Connie Rasinski	20th Century Fox	

=== 1953 ===
No.	Series	Title	Release	Director	Distributor	Notes
555	Dinky Duck	Wise Quacks	February 1, 1953	Mannie Davis	20th Century Fox	
556	Dinky Duck	Featherweight Champ	February 6, 1953	Eddie Donnelly	20th Century Fox	
557	Little Roquefort	Playful Puss	February 13, 1953	Mannie Davis	20th Century Fox	
558	The Terry Bears	Plumber's Helpers	March 27, 1953	Connie Rasinski	20th Century Fox	
559	Heckle and Jeckle	Ten Pin Terrors	April 7, 1953	Connie Rasinski	20th Century Fox	
560	Dinky Duck	The Orphan Egg	April 24, 1953	Eddie Donnelly	20th Century Fox	
561	Little Roquefort	Friday the 13th	May 8, 1953	Mannie Davis	20th Century Fox	
562	Mighty Mouse	Hot Rods	May 19, 1953	Eddie Donnelly	20th Century Fox	
563	Mighty Mouse	When Mousehood Was In Flower	May 21, 1953	Connie Rasinski	20th Century Fox	
564	The Terry Bears	Open House	June 5, 1953	Eddie Donnelly	20th Century Fox	
565	The Terry Bears	The Reluctant Pup	June 10, 1953	Mannie Davis	20th Century Fox	
566	Heckle and Jeckle	Bargain Daze	June 12, 1953	Mannie Davis	20th Century Fox	
567	—N/a	Sparky the Firefly	June 13, 1953	Connie Rasinski	20th Century Fox	
568	Little Roquefort	Mouse Menace	July 3, 1953	Eddie Donnelly	20th Century Fox	
569	—N/a	How to Keep Cool	July 31, 1953	Connie Rasinski	20th Century Fox	Features Dimwit
570	Dinky Duck	The Timid Scarecrow	August 28, 1953	Eddie Donnelly	20th Century Fox	
571	Heckle and Jeckle	Log Rollers	September 4, 1953	Mannie Davis	20th Century Fox	
572	Mighty Mouse	Spare the Rod	September 8, 1953	Connie Rasinski	20th Century Fox	
573	The Terry Bears	Growing Pains	October 2, 1953	Eddie Donnelly	20th Century Fox	
574	Little Roquefort	Runaway Mouse	October 23, 1953	Mannie Davis	20th Century Fox	
575	Dimwit	How to Relax	October 30, 1953	Connie Rasinski	20th Century Fox	
576	Heckle and Jeckle	Blind Date	November 27, 1953	Eddie Donnelly	20th Century Fox	
577	Mighty Mouse	The Helpless Hippo	December 25, 1953	Connie Rasinski	20th Century Fox	

=== 1954 ===
No.	Series	Title	Release	Director	Distributor	Notes
578	The Terry Bears	Pet Problems	January 1, 1954	Eddie Donnelly	20th Century Fox	
579	Little Roquefort	Prescription For Percy	January 29, 1954	Mannie Davis	20th Century Fox	
580	Heckle and Jeckle	Satisfied Customers	February 4, 1954	Connie Rasinski	20th Century Fox	
581	—N/a	Nonsense Newsreel	March 1, 1954	Mannie Davis	20th Century Fox	
582	—N/a	Arctic Rivals	April 7, 1954	Mannie Davis	20th Century Fox	Features Willie the Walrus
583	The Terry Bears	A Howling Success	May 20, 1954	Connie Rasinski	20th Century Fox	
584	Little Roquefort	The Cat's Revenge	June 18, 1954	Mannie Davis	20th Century Fox	
585	Phoney Baloney	The Tall Tale Teller	July 2, 1954	Connie Rasinski	20th Century Fox	
586	Mighty Mouse	The Reformed Wolf	July 9, 1954	Connie Rasinski	20th Century Fox	
587	Percival Sleuthhound	Pride of the Yard	July 26, 1954	Eddie Donnelly	20th Century Fox	
588	Heckle and Jeckle	Blue Plate Symphony	October 29, 1954	Connie Rasinski	20th Century Fox	

=== 1955 ===
No.	Series	Title	Release	Director	Distributor	Notes
589	—N/a	A Yokohama Yankee	January 1, 1955	Connie Rasinski	20th Century Fox	
590	Gandy Goose	Barnyard Actor	January 25, 1955	Connie Rasinski	20th Century Fox	
591	The Terry Bears	Duck Fever	February 16, 1955	Connie Rasinski	20th Century Fox	
592	Aesop's Fable	The First Flying Fish	March 1, 1955	Connie Rasinski	20th Century Fox	
593	Little Roquefort	No Sleep For Percy	March 11, 1955	Connie Rasinski	20th Century Fox	
594	—N/a	Daddy's Little Darling	April 1, 1955	Connie Rasinski	20th Century Fox	Features Dimwit
595	—N/a	An Igloo For Two	May 1, 1955	Connie Rasinski	20th Century Fox	Features Willie the Walrus
596	—N/a	Good Deed Daly	June 1, 1955	Connie Rasinski	20th Century Fox	Features Good Deed Daly
597	—N/a	Bird Symphony	June 1, 1955	Connie Rasinski	20th Century Fox	
598	—N/a	Phony News Flashes	August 1, 1955	Connie Rasinski	20th Century Fox	
599	—N/a	Foxed By A Fox	August 1, 1955	Connie Rasinski	20th Century Fox	Features Spoofy the Fox
600	—N/a	The Last Mouse of Hamelin	August 1, 1955	Connie Rasinski	20th Century Fox	
601	—N/a	Little Red Hen	August 1, 1955	Connie Rasinski	20th Century Fox	
602	Heckle and Jeckle	Miami Maniacs	November 12, 1955	Connie Rasinski	20th Century Fox	
603	Heckle and Jeckle	Pirate's Gold	December 14, 1955	Eddie Donnelly	20th Century Fox	
604	The Terry Bears	Baffling Bunnies	December 31, 1955	Connie Rasinski	20th Century Fox	

=== 1956 ===
No.	Series	Title	Release	Director	Distributor	Notes
605	—N/a	The Clockmaker's Dog	January 1, 1956	Connie Rasinski	20th Century Fox	
606	—N/a	Park Avenue Pussycat	January 1, 1956	Connie Rasinski	20th Century Fox	
607	—N/a	Uranium Blues	February 1, 1956	Connie Rasinski	20th Century Fox	Features Farmer Al Falfa
608	—N/a	Hep Mother Hubbard	March 1, 1956	Connie Rasinski	20th Century Fox	
609	—N/a	Scouts to the Rescue	March 1, 1956	Connie Rasinski	20th Century Fox	Features Good Deed Daly
610	—N/a	Oceans of Love	April 1, 1956	Connie Rasinski	20th Century Fox	
611	—N/a	Lucky Dog	May 1, 1956	Connie Rasinski	20th Century Fox	
612	Clancy the Bull	Police Dogged	June 1, 1956	Connie Rasinski	20th Century Fox	
613	—N/a	The Brave Little Brave	July 1, 1956	Mannie Davis	20th Century Fox	
614	—N/a	Cloak and Stagger	August 1, 1956	Connie Rasinski	20th Century Fox	Features Good Deed Daly

=== 1957 ===
No.	Series	Title	Release	Director	Distributor	Notes
615	John Doormat	Topsy TV	January 1, 1957	Gene Deitch & Connie Rasinski	20th Century Fox	
616	—N/a	A Hare-Breadth Finish	February 1, 1957	Connie Rasinski	20th Century Fox	
617	—N/a	African Jungle Hunt	March 1, 1957	Connie Rasinski	20th Century Fox	Features Phoney Baloney
618	—N/a	The Bone Ranger	April 1, 1957	Gene Deitch & Connie Rasinski	20th Century Fox	
619	—N/a	Love Is Blind	May 1, 1957	Mannie Davis	20th Century Fox	
620	Gaston Le Crayon	Gaston Is Here	May 1, 1957	Gene Deitch & Connie Rasinski	20th Century Fox	
621	John Doormat	Shove Thy Neighbor	June 1, 1957	Gene Deitch & Connie Rasinski	20th Century Fox	
622	—N/a	A Bum Steer	June 20, 1957	Mannie Davis & Gene Deitch	20th Century Fox	
623	Clint Clobber	Clint Clobber's Cat	July 1, 1957	Gene Deitch & Connie Rasinski	20th Century Fox	
624	Spoofy	Gag Buster	July 10, 1957	Gene Deitch & Connie Rasinski	20th Century Fox	
625	—N/a	Flebus	August 1, 1957	Gene Deitch & Ernest Pintoff	20th Century Fox	Features Flebus
626	Dinky Duck	It's A Living	November 15, 1957	Gene Deitch, Winfield Hoskins & Mannie Davis	20th Century Fox	

=== 1958 ===
No.	Series	Title	Release	Director	Distributor	Notes
627	Gaston Le Crayon	Gaston's Baby	March 1, 1958	Gene Deitch & Connie Rasinski	20th Century Fox	
628	Clint Clobber	Springtime For Clobber	April 1, 1958	Gene Deitch & Connie Rasinski	20th Century Fox	
629	—N/a	The Juggler of Our Lady	April 1, 1958	Gene Deitch & Al Kouzel	20th Century Fox	
630	Gaston Le Crayon	Gaston Go Home	May 1, 1958	Gene Deitch & Connie Rasinski	20th Century Fox	
631	John Doormat	Dustcap Doormat	June 1, 1958	Gene Deitch & Al Kouzel	20th Century Fox	
632	—N/a	Sick, Sick Sidney	June 4, 1958	Art Bartsch & Gene Deitch	20th Century Fox	Features Sidney the Elephant
633	Clint Clobber	Camp Clobber	July 22, 1958	Gene Deitch & Dave Tendlar	20th Century Fox	
634	Clint Clobber	Old Mother Clobber	September 2, 1958	Gene Deitch & Connie Rasinski	20th Century Fox	
635	Gaston Le Crayon	Gaston's Easel Life	October 1, 1958	Gene Deitch & Dave Tendlar	20th Century Fox	
636	Clint Clobber	Signed, Sealed, and Clobbered	November 1, 1958	Gene Deitch & Connie Rasinski	20th Century Fox	
637	—N/a	Sidney's Family Tree	December 1, 1958	Art Bartsch & Gene Deitch	20th Century Fox	Features Sidney the Elephant. Nominated for the Academy Award for Best Short Subject.

=== 1959 ===
No.	Series	Title	Release	Director	Distributor	Notes
638	Clint Clobber	Clobber's Ballet Ache	January 1, 1959	Gene Deitch & Connie Rasinski	20th Century Fox	
639	—N/a	The Tale of A Dog	February 1, 1959	Gene Deitch & Dave Tendlar	20th Century Fox	
640	John Doormat	Another Day, Another Doormat	April 1, 1959	Gene Deitch & Al Kouzel	20th Century Fox	
641	Clint Clobber	The Flamboyant Arms	April 1, 1959	Gene Deitch & Connie Rasinski	20th Century Fox	
642	—N/a	Foofle's Train Ride	May 13, 1959	Gene Deitch & Dave Tendlar	20th Century Fox	Features Foofle
643	Gaston Le Crayon	Gaston's Mama Lisa	June 1, 1959	Gene Deitch & Connie Rasinski	20th Century Fox	
644	—N/a	The Minute and A ½ Man	July 4, 1959	Dave Tendlar	20th Century Fox	Features Hector Heathcote
645	—N/a	The Fabulous Firework Family	August 1, 1959	Gene Deitch & Al Kouzel	20th Century Fox	
646	—N/a	Hashimoto-San	September 6, 1959	Bob Kuwahara & Dave Tendlar	20th Century Fox	Features Hashimoto
647	Heckle and Jeckle	Wild Life	September 9, 1959	Martin Taras	20th Century Fox	
648	Mighty Mouse	Outer Space Visitor	November 1, 1959	Dave Tendlar	20th Century Fox	
649	—N/a	The Leaky Faucet	December 1, 1959	Martin Taras	20th Century Fox	Features Dimwit
650	—N/a	Hide and Go Sidney	December 2, 1959	Art Bartsch	20th Century Fox	Features Sidney the Elephant

== 1960s ==
=== 1960 ===
No.	Title	Release	Director	Distributor	Notes
651	The Space Varmint	January 1, 1960	Connie Rasinski	20th Century Fox	Features Deputy Dawg & Astronut. Some sources state that it was released 1962. Originally premiered on television first.
652	The Misunderstood Giant	February 1, 1960	Connie Rasinski	20th Century Fox	
653	Foofle's Picnic	March 1, 1960	Dave Tendlar	20th Century Fox	Features Foofle
654	The Tiger King	March 1, 1960	Connie Rasinski	20th Century Fox	
655	The Famous Ride	April 1, 1960	Connie Rasinski	20th Century Fox	Features Hector Heathcote
656	Tusk, Tusk	April 3, 1960	Martin Taras	20th Century Fox	Features Sidney the Elephant
657	Thousand Smile Check-Up	April 24, 1960	Martin Taras	20th Century Fox	Features Heckle & Jeckle
658	Hearts and Glowers	June 1, 1960	Martin Taras	20th Century Fox	
659	Trapeze, Pleeze	June 12, 1960	Connie Rasinski	20th Century Fox	Features Heckle & Jeckle
660	Mint Men	June 23, 1960	Dave Tendlar	20th Century Fox	Features Heckle & Jeckle
661	The Wayward Hat	July 1, 1960	Dave Tendlar	20th Century Fox	Features Foofle
662	The Littlest Bully	August 9, 1960	Martin Taras	20th Century Fox	Features Sidney the Elephant
663	Two Ton Baby Sitter	September 4, 1960	Dave Tendlar	20th Century Fox	Features Sidney the Elephant
664	Deep Sea Doodle	September 16, 1960	Dave Tendlar	20th Century Fox	Features Heckle & Jeckle
665	Tin Pan Alley Cat	October 1, 1960	Dave Tendlar	20th Century Fox	
666	Stunt Men	November 23, 1960	Martin Taras	20th Century Fox	Features Heckle & Jeckle
667	House of Hashimoto	November 30, 1960	Connie Rasinski	20th Century Fox	Features Hashimoto
668	Daniel Boone Jr.	December 8, 1960	Dave Tendlar	20th Century Fox	Features Hector Heathcote
669	The Mysterious Package	December 15, 1960	Mannie Davis	20th Century Fox	Features Mighty Mouse

=== 1961 ===
No.	Title	Release	Director	Distributor	Notes
670	Night Life In Tokyo	February 1, 1961	Mannie Davis	20th Century Fox	Features Hashimoto.
671	So Sorry Pussycat	March 1, 1961	Art Bartsch	20th Century Fox	Features Hashimoto.
672	Drum Roll	March 31, 1961	Dave Tendlar	20th Century Fox	Features Hector Heathcote
673	Son of Hashimoto	April 12, 1961	Connie Rasinski	20th Century Fox	Features Hashimoto
674	Railroaded to Fame	May 7, 1961	Dave Tendlar	20th Century Fox	Features Hector Heathcote.
675	Strange Companion	May 12, 1961	Mannie Davis	20th Century Fox	Features Hashimoto
676	The First Fast Mail	May 19, 1961		20th Century Fox	Features Hector Heathcote
677	Honorable Cat Story	June 1, 1961	Connie Rasinski	20th Century Fox	Features Hashimoto.
678	Crossing the Delaware	June 9, 1961	Art Bartsch	20th Century Fox	Features Hector Heathcote
679	Banana Binge	July 12, 1961	Connie Rasinski	20th Century Fox	Features Sidney the Elephant
680	Unsung Hero	July 21, 1961		20th Century Fox	Features Hector Heathcote
681	Meat, Drink and Be Merry	August 1, 1961	Dave Tendlar	20th Century Fox	Features Sidney the Elephant.
682	Really Big Act	September 20, 1961	Connie Rasinski	20th Century Fox	Features Sidney the Elephant
683	Clown Jewels	October 1, 1961	Dave Tendlar	20th Century Fox	Features Sidney the Elephant.
684	Tree Spree	November 1, 1961	Larz Bourne	20th Century Fox	Features Sidney the Elephant.
685	Sappy New Year	November 10, 1961	Dave Tendlar	20th Century Fox	Features Heckle & Jeckle.
686	Cat Alarm	December 31, 1961	Connie Rasinski	20th Century Fox	Features Mighty Mouse. Final appearance of Mighty Mouse.

=== 1962 ===
No.	Title	Release	Director	Distributor	Notes
687	Honorable House Cat	January 1, 1962	Mannie Davis	20th Century Fox	Features Hashimoto
688	Klondike Strikes Out	January 1, 1962	Dave Tendlar	20th Century Fox	Features Hector Heathcote
689	Where There's Smoke	February 1, 1962	Bob Kuwahara	20th Century Fox	Features Deputy Dawg. Originally premiered on television first.
690	He-Man Seaman	March 1, 1962	Art Bartsch	20th Century Fox	Features Hector Heathcote
691	Honorable Family Problem	March 30, 1962	Bob Kuwahara	20th Century Fox	Features Hashimoto
692	Nobody's Ghoul	April 1, 1962	Dave Tendlar	20th Century Fox	Features Deputy Dawg. Originally premiered on television first.
693	Peanut Battle	April 25, 1962	Connie Rasinski	20th Century Fox	Features Sidney the Elephant. A negative exists at the British Film Institute.
694	Loyal Royalty	May 18, 1962	Bob Kuwahara	20th Century Fox	Features Hashimoto
695	Riverboat Mission	May 20, 1962	Dave Tendlar	20th Century Fox	Features Hector Heathcote
696	Rebel Trouble	June 1, 1962	Dave Tendlar	20th Century Fox	Features Deputy Dawg. Originally premiered on television first.
697	Send Your Elephant to Camp	July 4, 1962	Art Bartsch	20th Century Fox	Features Sidney the Elephant
698	Shotgun Shambles	August 1, 1962	Dave Tendlar	20th Century Fox	Features Deputy Dawg. Originally premiered on television first.
699	Honorable Paint In the Neck	August 22, 1962	Bob Kuwahara	20th Century Fox	Features Hashimoto
700	Cotton Pickin' Picnic	September 22, 1962	Connie Rasinski	20th Century Fox	Features Deputy Dawg
701	The Fleet's Out	October 1, 1962	Connie Rasinski	20th Century Fox	Features Sidney the Elephant.
702	First Flight Up	October 30, 1962	Bill Tytla	20th Century Fox	Features Hector Heathcote
703	Home Life	November 1, 1962	Connie Rasinski	20th Century Fox	Features Sidney the Elephant. Only survives fully in French.
704	Big Chief No Treaty	November 10, 1962	Bob Kuwahara	20th Century Fox	Features Deputy Dawg. Originally premiered on television first.
705	To Be Or Not to Be	December 29, 1962	Connie Rasinski	20th Century Fox	Features Sidney the Elephant

=== 1963 ===
No.	Title	Release	Director	Distributor	Notes
706	A Flight to the Finish	January 1, 1963	Dave Tendlar	20th Century Fox	Features Hector Heathcote
707	Tea House Mouse	January 1, 1963	Bob Kuwahara	20th Century Fox	Features Hashimoto. Believed lost.
708	To Be or Not to Be	February 1, 1963		20th Century Fox	A negative exists at British Film Institute.
709	Astronut	March 1, 1963	Connie Rasinski	20th Century Fox	Features Deputy Dawg
710	Tea Party	April 1, 1963	Dave Tendlar	20th Century Fox	Features Hector Heathcote.
711	The Hungry Astronut	April 27, 1963	Bob Kuwahara	20th Century Fox	Features Deputy Dawg & Astronut
712	Pearl Crazy	May 1, 1963	Bob Kuwahara	20th Century Fox	Features Hashimoto.
713	Sidney's White Elephant	May 1, 1963	Art Bartsch	20th Century Fox	Features Sidney the Elephant. Believed lost.
714	Cherry Blossom Festival	June 17, 1963	Bob Kuwahara	20th Century Fox	Features Hashimoto
715	The Missing Genie	June 19, 1963	Connie Rasinski	20th Century Fox	Features Luno the White Stallion
716	Driven to Extraction	June 28, 1963	Art Bartsch	20th Century Fox	Features Sidney the Elephant
717	A Bell For Philadelphia	July 1, 1963	Bob Kuwahara	20th Century Fox	Features Hector Heathcote. Believed lost
718	Valley Forge Hero	August 28, 1963	Dave Tendlar	20th Century Fox	Features Hector Heathcote. Originally premiered on television first.
719	The Big Clean-Up	September 1, 1963	Dave Tendlar	20th Century Fox	Features Hector Heathcote
720	Foxed by a Fox	September 1, 1963		20th Century Fox	Features Hector Heathcote. Believed lost.
721	Trouble In Baghdad	September 13, 1963	Connie Rasinski	20th Century Fox	Features Luno the White Stallion
722	Split-Level Treehouse	October 30, 1963	Art Bartsch	20th Century Fox	Features Sidney the Elephant
723	Expert Explorer	November 6, 1963		20th Century Fox	Features Hector Heathcote. Originally premiered on television first.
724	Spooky-Yaki	November 13, 1963	Bob Kuwahara	20th Century Fox	Features Hashimoto
725	King Rounder	December 31, 1963	Connie Rasinski	20th Century Fox	Features Luno the White Stallion

=== 1964 ===
No.	Title	Release	Director	Distributor	Notes
726	Roc-A-Bye Sinbad	January 1, 1964			Features Luno the White Stallion
727	Hold the Fort!	January 4, 1964			Features Hector Heathcote. Originally premiered on television first.
728	Search for a Symbol	January 18, 1964			Features Hector Heathcote
729	The First Telephone	January 25, 1964			Features Hector Heathcote.
730	High Flyer	February 1, 1964			Features Hector Heathcote.
731	The Red Tractor	February 1, 1964	Dave Tendlar	20th Century Fox	Features Duckwood
732	Messy Messenger	February 29, 1964		20th Century Fox	Features Hector Heathcote.
733	Brother From Outer Space	March 1, 1964	Connie Rasinski	20th Century Fox	Features Astronut
734	Short-Term Sheriff	May 1, 1964	Connie Rasinski	20th Century Fox	Features Duckwood
735	Kisser Plant	June 1, 1964	Connie Rasinski	20th Century Fox	Features Astronut
736	Adventure By the Sea	July 15, 1964	Art Bartsch	20th Century Fox	Features Luno the White Stallion
737	Oil Thru the Day	August 1, 1964	Dave Tendlar	20th Century Fox	Features Duckwood
738	Hats Off to Hector!	August 18, 1964	Dave Tendlar	20th Century Fox	Features Hector Heathcote. Originally premiered on television first.
739	Outer Galaxy Gazette	September 2, 1964	Connie Rasinski	20th Century Fox	Features Astronut
740	The Gold Dust Bandit	October 1, 1964	Art Bartsch	20th Century Fox	Features Luno the White Stallion
741	Search For Misery	November 1, 1964	Bob Kuwahara	20th Century Fox	Features Pitiful Penelope
742	Molecular Mixup	December 26, 1964	Dave Tendlar	20th Century Fox	Features Astronut

=== 1965 ===
No.	Title	Release	Director	Distributor	Notes
743	The Sky's the Limit	February 1, 1965	Dave Tendlar	20th Century Fox	Features Astronut
744	Freight Fright	March 1, 1965	Connie Rasinski	20th Century Fox	Features Possible Possum. Originally premiered on television first.
745	Gadmouse the Apprentice Good Fairy	March 10, 1965	Ralph Bakshi	20th Century Fox	Features Sad Cat
746	Weather Magic	May 1, 1965	Cosmo Anzilotti	20th Century Fox	Features Astronut
747	Don't Spill the Beans	May 26, 1965	Ralph Bakshi	20th Century Fox	Features Sad Cat
748	Darn Barn	June 1, 1965	Connie Rasinski	20th Century Fox	Features Possible Possum. Originally premiered on television first.
749	Dress Reversal	July 1, 1965	Ralph Bakshi	20th Century Fox	Features Sad Cat
750	Robots In Toyland	August 1, 1965	Connie Rasinski	20th Century Fox	Features Astronut
751	Git That Guitar	September 1, 1965	Art Bartsch	20th Century Fox	Features Possible Possum. Originally premiered on television first.
752	Twinkle Twinkle Little Telestar	November 1, 1965	Art Bartsch	20th Century Fox	Features Astronut
753	The Toothless Beaver	December 20, 1965	Connie Rasinski	20th Century Fox	Features Possible Possum. Originally premiered on television first.
754	The Third Musketeer	December 23, 1965	Ralph Bakshi	20th Century Fox	Features Sad Cat

=== 1966 ===
No.	Title	Release	Director	Distributor	Notes
755	Gems From Gemini	January 1, 1966	Dave Tendlar	20th Century Fox	Features Astronut
756	Dr. Ha-Ha	March 30, 1966	Ralph Bakshi	20th Century Fox	Features James Hound
757	Champion Chump	April 1, 1966	Art Bartsch & Connie Rasinski	20th Century Fox	Features Martian Moochers
758	Haunted House Cleaning	May 1, 1966	Connie Rasinski	20th Century Fox	Features Astronut.
759	Messed Up Movie Makers	June 1, 1966	George Bakes & Al Chiarito	20th Century Fox	Features Heckle & Jeckle. Final appearance of Heckle & Jeckle.
760	Scuba Duba Do	July 1, 1966	Ralph Bakshi	20th Century Fox	Features Sad Cat
761	Cowardly Watchdog	August 1, 1966	Dave Tendlar	20th Century Fox	Features Martian Moochers
762	The Monster Master	September 2, 1966	Cosmo Anzilotti & Ralph Bakshi	20th Century Fox	Features James Hound
763	Watch the Butterfly	October 1, 1966	Dave Tendlar	20th Century Fox	Features Possible Possum. Originally premiered on television first.
764	The Rain Drain	October 12, 1966	Art Bartsch & Dave Tendlar	20th Century Fox	Features James Hound
765	Dreamnapping	December 29, 1966	Art Bartsch & Dave Tendlar	20th Century Fox	Features James Hound
766	The Phantom Skyscraper	December 31, 1966	Art Bartsch & Dave Tendlar	20th Century Fox	Features James Hound.

=== 1967 ===
No.	Title	Release	Director	Distributor	Notes
767	The Heat's Off	April 26, 1967	Ralph Bakshi, Cosmo Anzilotti & Art Bartsch	20th Century Fox	Features James Hound
768	It's For the Birds	May 26, 1967	Ralph Bakshi, Cosmo Anzilotti & Art Bartsch	20th Century Fox	Features James Hound. Believed lost.
769	A Voodoo Spell	June 7, 1967	Ralph Bakshi, Cosmo Anzilotti & Art Bartsch	20th Century Fox	Features James Hound.
770	Give Me Liberty	August 1, 1967	Ralph Bakshi, Cosmo Anzilotti & Art Bartsch	20th Century Fox	Features James Hound
771	Which Is Witch	October 6, 1967	Ralph Bakshi, Cosmo Anzilotti & Art Bartsch	20th Century Fox	Features James Hound. Lost in its original English version.
772	Dr. Rhinestone's Theory	November 5, 1967	Ralph Bakshi, Cosmo Anzilotti & Art Bartsch	20th Century Fox	Features James Hound
773	Traffic Trouble	November 24, 1967	Ralph Bakshi, Cosmo Anzilotti & Art Bartsch	20th Century Fox	Features James Hound
774	Mr. Winlucky	November 29, 1967	Ralph Bakshi, Cosmo Anzilotti & Art Bartsch	20th Century Fox	Features James Hound
775	Fancy Plants	November 30, 1967	Ralph Bakshi, Cosmo Anzilotti & Art Bartsch	20th Century Fox	Features James Hound
776	Bugged By a Bug	December 1, 1967	Ralph Bakshi, Cosmo Anzilotti & Art Bartsch	20th Century Fox	Features James Hound
777	Frozen Sparklers	December 7, 1967	Ralph Bakshi, Cosmo Anzilotti & Art Bartsch	20th Century Fox	Features James Hound. Believed lost.
778	Baron Von Go-Go	December 31, 1967	Ralph Bakshi, Cosmo Anzilotti & Art Bartsch	20th Century Fox	Features James Hound.

=== 1968 ===
No.	Title	Release	Director	Distributor	Notes
779	Dribble Drabble	January 1, 1968	Art Bartsch	20th Century Fox	Features Sad Cat.
780	Judo Kudos	January 1, 1968	Art Bartsch	20th Century Fox	Features Sad Cat
781	Big Game Fishing	February 1, 1968	Al Kouzel	20th Century Fox	Features Sad Cat
782	Grand Prix Winner	March 1, 1968	Art Bartsch	20th Century Fox	Features Sad Cat.
783	Big Bad Bobcat	April 1, 1968	Cosmo Anzilotti	20th Century Fox	Features Possible Possum. Originally produced for television in 1966
784	Commander Great Guy	May 1, 1968	Art Bartsch	20th Century Fox	Features Sad Cat
785	All Teed Off	June 1, 1968	Art Bartsch	20th Century Fox	Features Sad Cat
786	Surprisin' Exercisin'	July 1, 1968	Cosmo Anzilotti	20th Century Fox	Features Possible Possum. Originally produced for television in 1966.
787	The Abominable Mountaineers	September 1, 1968	Art Bartsch	20th Century Fox	Features Sad Cat.
788	The Rock Hound	October 1, 1968	Dave Tendlar	20th Century Fox	Features Possible Possum. Originally produced for television in 1966.
789	Loops and Swoops	November 1, 1968	Art Bartsch	20th Century Fox	Features Sad Cat. Final theatrical cartoon produced by the studio.
790	Mount Piney	December 1, 1968	Art Bartsch	20th Century Fox	Features Possible Possum. Originally produced for television in 1966.
791	Sally Sargent	1968	Fred Calvert		

=== 1969 ===
No.	Title	Release	Director	Distributor	Notes
792	The Ruby Eye of the Monkey God	January 1, 1969	Fred Calvert	20th Century Fox	Final short commissioned by the studio. Outsourced by Fred Calvert Productions.
793	The General's Little Helper	February 1, 1969	Art Bartsch?	20th Century Fox	Features Possible Possum. Originally produced for television in 1966.
794	Space Pet	March 1, 1969	Cosmo Anzilotti	20th Century Fox	Features Astronut. Originally produced for television in 1966.
795	The Stretcher	April 1, 1969	Ralph Bakshi & Robert Taylor	20th Century Fox	Features Mighty Heroes. Originally produced for television in 1966.
796	The Red Swamp Pox	May 1, 1969	Ralph Bakshi & Robert Taylor	20th Century Fox	Features Possible Possum. Lost in its original English version. Originally produced for television in 1966.
797	The Bold Eagle	May 1, 1969	Art Bartsch	20th Century Fox	Features Possible Possum. Originally produced for television in 1965.
798	Scientific Sideshow	June 1, 1969	Art Bartsch	20th Century Fox	Features Astronut. Believed lost. Originally produced for television in 1965.
799	The Shrinker	July 1, 1969	Robert Taylor	20th Century Fox	Features The Mighty Heroes
800	Balloon Snatcher	September 7, 1969	Cosmo Anzilotti	20th Century Fox	Features Astronut. Originally produced for television in 1965.
801	The Frog	October 1, 1969	Ralph Bakshi & Robert Taylor	20th Century Fox	Features Mighty Heroes. Originally produced for television in 1966
802	Swamp Snapper	November 1, 1969	Art Bartsch	20th Century Fox	Features Possible Possum. Originally produced for television in 1966.
803	The Toy Man	December 1, 1969	Ralph Bakshi & Robert Taylor	20th Century Fox	Features Mighty Heroes. Originally produced for television in 1966.

== 1970s ==
=== 1970 ===
No.	Title	Release	Director	Distributor	Notes
804	Going Ape	January 1, 1970	Connie Rasinski	20th Century Fox	Features Astronut. Originally produced for television in 1965.
805	Land Grab	February 1, 1970	Dave Tendlar	20th Century Fox	Features Hector Heathcote. Originally produced for television in 1963.
806	Surface Surf Aces	March 1, 1970	Cosmo Anzilotti	20th Century Fox	Features Possible Possum. Originally produced for television in 1965.
807	The Ghost Monster	April 1, 1970	Ralph Bakshi & Robert Taylor	20th Century Fox	Features Mighty Heroes. Originally produced for television in 1966.
808	Martian Moochers	May 1, 1970	Bob Kuwahara	20th Century Fox	Features Astronut & Martian Moochers. Originally produced for television in 1964.
809	Lost and Foundation	June 1, 1970	Ralph Bakshi	20th Century Fox	Features Hector Heathcote. Originally produced for television in 1963.
810	Swamp Water Taffy	July 1, 1970	Cosmo Anzilotti & Art Bartsch	20th Century Fox	Features Possible Possum. Originally produced for television in 1965.
811	The Drifter	August 1, 1970	Ralph Bakshi	20th Century Fox	Features The Mighty Heroes. Copyrighted September 30, 1966.
812	The Proton Pulsator	September 1, 1970	Ralph Bakshi & Robert Taylor	20th Century Fox	Features Astronut. Originally produced for television in 1965.
813	Belabour Thy Neighbor	October 1, 1970	Cosmo Anzilotti	20th Century Fox	Features Hector Heathcote. Believed lost. Originally produced for television in 1963.
814	Slinky Mink	November 1, 1970	Art Bartsch & Connie Rasinski	20th Century Fox	Features Possible Possum. Lost in its original English version. Originally produced for television in 1965.
815	The Shocker	December 1, 1970	Ralph Bakshi & Robert Taylor	20th Century Fox	Features Mighty Heroes. Originally produced for television in 1966

=== 1971 ===
No.	Title	Release	Director	Distributor	Notes
816	Oscar's Birthday Present	January 1, 1971	Bob Kuwahara	20th Century Fox	Features Astronut. Originally produced for television in 1966.
817	Train Terrain	February 1, 1971	Art Bartsch	20th Century Fox	Features Hector Heathcote. Originally produced for television in 1963.
818	Berry Funny	March 1, 1971	Cosmo Anzilotti	20th Century Fox	Features Possible Possum. Lost in its original English version. Originally produced for television in 1966
819	The Enlarger	April 1, 1971	Ralph Bakshi & Robert Taylor	20th Century Fox	Features Mighty Heroes. Originally produced for television in 1966.
820	Oscar's Thinking Cap	May 1, 1971	Art Bartsch	20th Century Fox	Features Astronut. Originally produced for television in 1965.
821	Wind Bag	June 1, 1971	Art Bartsch	20th Century Fox	Features Hector Heathcote. Produced for television in 1963.
822	Big Mo	July 1, 1971	Art Bartsch	20th Century Fox	Features Possible Possum. Originally produced for television in 1966 and copyrighted July 8, 1968.
823	The Dusters	August 1, 1971	Ralph Bakshi & Robert Taylor	20th Century Fox	Features Mighty Heroes. Originally produced for television in 1967.
824	Ice Cream For Help	October 1, 1971	Art Bartsch	20th Century Fox	Features Hector Heathcote. Originally produced for television in 1963.
825	No Space Like Home	October 1, 1971		20th Century Fox	Features Astronut. Originally produced for television in 1965.
826	Kooky Cucumbers	November 1, 1971	Dave Tendlar	20th Century Fox	Features Possible Possum. Originally produced for television in 1965.
827	The Big Freeze	December 1, 1971	Ralph Bakshi & Robert Taylor	20th Century Fox	Features Mighty Heroes. Originally produced for television in 1967.

=== 1972 ===
No.	Title	Release	Director	Distributor	Notes
828	The Invisibeam	January 1, 1972		20th Century Fox	Features Astronut. Originally produced for television in 1965
829	Happy Hollow Hay Ride	March 1, 1972	Art Bartsch	20th Century Fox	Features Possible Possum. Originally produced for television in 1966 and Copyrighted on July 8, 1968
830	The Timekeeper	April 1, 1972		20th Century Fox	Features The Mighty Heroes.
831	Movie Magic	May 1, 1972		20th Century Fox	Features Astronut
832	Barrel of Fun	June 1, 1972		20th Century Fox	Features Hector Heathcote. Produced for television in 1964.
833	Don't Burro Trouble	July 1, 1972	Connie Rasinski	20th Century Fox	Features Possible Possum. Produced in 1966.
834	The Scarecrow	August 1, 1972		20th Century Fox	Features The Mighty Heros
835	Hokey Home Movies	September 1, 1972	Bob Kuwahara	20th Century Fox	Features Astronut. Produced in 1964.
836	Trestle Hassle	November 1, 1972		20th Century Fox	Features Possible Possum
837	The Time Eraser	December 1, 1972		20th Century Fox	Features The Mighty Heroes

=== 1973 ===
No.	Title	Release	Director	Distributor	Notes
838	Oscar's Moving Day	January 1, 1973		20th Century Fox	Features Astronut.
839	The Chestnut Nut	March 1, 1973		20th Century Fox	Features Possible Possum. Produced for television in 1966
840	The Return of the Monsterizer	April 1, 1973		20th Century Fox	Features The Mighty Heroes
841	Space Cowboy	May 1, 1973		20th Century Fox	Features Astronut
842	Peace Pipe	June 1, 1973		20th Century Fox	Features Hector Heathcote. Produced for television in 1963.
843	Pirate Plunder Blunder	July 1, 1973	Art Bartsch	20th Century Fox	Features Possible Possum
844	The Paper Monster	August 1, 1973		20th Century Fox	Features The Mighty Heroes
845	Who's Dragon	September 1, 1973		20th Century Fox	Features Luno
846	The Hectormobile	October 1, 1973		20th Century Fox	Features Hector Heathcote. Produced for television in 1963.
847	Harm Sweet Home	November 1, 1973		20th Century Fox	Features Possible Possum.
848	The Square Planet	December 1, 1973		20th Century Fox	Features Luno

=== 1974 ===
No.	Title	Release	Director	Distributor	Notes
849	The Raven	March 1, 1974		20th Century Fox	Features The Mighty Heroes
850	Jungle Jack	May 1, 1974		20th Century Fox	Features Luno
851	The Bigger Digger	August 1, 1974		20th Century Fox	Features The Mighty Heroes
852	Mixed Up Matador	October 1, 1974		20th Century Fox	Features Luno
853	Har Har Hapoon	November 1, 1974		20th Century Fox	Features Hector Heathcote. Produced for television in 1963.
854	Hobo Hassle	December 1, 1974		20th Century Fox	Features Possible Possum. Produced in 1965.

=== 1975 ===
No.	Title	Release	Director	Distributor	Notes
855	The Plastic Blaster	January 1, 1975		20th Century Fox	Features The Mighty Heroes
856	Li'l Whooper	February 1, 1975	Dave Tendlar	20th Century Fox	Features Deputy Dawg
857	Melvin The Magnificent	April 1, 1975		20th Century Fox	Features Luno
858	Friend Fox	May 1, 1975	Dave Tendlar	20th Century Fox	Features Deputy Dawg
859	The Junker	June 1, 1975		20th Century Fox	Features The Mighty Heroes
860	Dog Gone Catfish	August 1, 1975	Connie Rasinski	20th Century Fox	Features Deputy Dawg
861	The Monsterizer	October 1, 1975		20th Century Fox	Features The Mighty Heroes
862	People's Choice	November 1, 1975	Connie Rasinski	20th Century Fox	Features Deputy Dawg
