= Puddy the Pup =

Cartoon character

Puddy the Pup is a Terrytoons cartoon character who featured in a theatrical short film series from 1935 to 1942. He also appeared as Farmer Al Falfa's sidekick in other Terrytoon shorts, such as Tin Can Tourist and Farmer Al Falfa's Prize Package. The character is a white dog with a black ear, a design similar to generic dogs in various Terrytoons.

== Filmography ==
#	Title	Director	Release date	Reissue title	Curiosities
1	The Bull Fight	Paul Terry, Frank Moser	February 8, 1935		
2	Cats in a Bag	Mannie Davis, George Gordon	July 10, 1936		
3	Puddy the Pup and the Gypsies	Mannie Davis, George Gordon	July 24, 1936	Farm Frolics (Castle Films)	
4	Sunken Treasures	Mannie Davis, George Gordon	October 16, 1936	Down in the Deep (Castle Films)	
5	The Hot Spell	Mannie Davis, George Gordon	December 12, 1936		
6	The Book Shop	Mannie Davis, George Gordon	February 5, 1937		
7	Puddy's Coronation	Mannie Davis, George Gordon	May 14, 1937	Hail the King (Castle Films). Mistakenly regarded as an episode of Kiko the Kangaroo in the Castle Films reissue.	
8	The Homeless Pup	George Gordon	July 23, 1937		
9	The Dog and the Bone	George Gordon	November 12, 1937	Puddy Picks a Bone! (Castle Films)	
10	His Off Day (aka His Day Off)	Connie Rasinski	February 4, 1938	Tricky Troubles (Castle Films)	
11	Happy and Lucky	Connie Rasinski	March 18, 1938	Dog Wanted! (Castle Films)	
12	The Big Top	Mannie Davis	May 12, 1938	Circus Capers (Castle Films)	
13	The Big Build-up	Mannie Davis	September 4, 1942		Here, Puddy appears more different, he is no longer furry, his ears are thin and, in addition to his black, he has a black ball under his ear, half of his face is colored black, on the same side as the ear. It bears a resemblance to the dog from A Dog's Dream (1941), only without the black coloring on the ear, the black ball under its tail and half of its face.

- A Puddy-esque dog appears in A Dog's Dream (1941), but without black spots on one of his ears, on his tail, he has long ears and is not furry and, mistakenly, was considered as an episode of Puddy in reissue version.
