= On the Scent =

On the Scent may refer to

- On the Scent (installation), a theatrical piece of olfactory art
- Skunked Again, which was released with an alternative title
