= Kiko and the Honey Bears =

1936 traditionally animated buddy comedy short film

- Directed by: George Gordon; Mannie Davis
- Story by: Joseph Barbera
- Produced by: Paul Terry
- Color process: Black and white
- Production company: Terrytoons
- Distributed by: 20th Century Fox
- Release date: August 21, 1936
- Running time: 6 minutes
- Language: English

Kiko and the Honey Bears is a 1936 traditionally animated buddy comedy short film created at Terrytoons, and distributed by 20th Century Fox. It is the second film to feature Kiko the Kangaroo as well as the character's first solo short film.

== Plot ==
When a mother bear gets burdened by the pesky antics of her cubs, she places a sign in front of her house to hire a caretaker. Immediately Kiko, who is passing by, reads the ad and takes the job.

Kiko plays with the cubs in the woods. The ways he assists them include being their diving board and seesaw. After such a play, Kiko takes a nap under a tree. Moments later, a hunter and pack of hounds come to the woods. The cubs attempt to run and hide from their pursuers. When the hunter fires a gun, Kiko is awakened and very surprised. Kiko brawls with the hunter and the hounds, knocking the pursuers out of the scene. He then takes the cubs and leaves.

Kiko returns to the home of the cubs, much to the delight of the mother bear. Singing in the melody of Kiko's theme song, the cubs tell their mother how Kiko saved them in the woods.

Preceded by Farmer Al Falfa's Prize Package	Kiko the Kangaroo Cartoons; 1936	Succeeded by Kiko Foils the Fox
