= Red Hot Music =

1937 animated short film

- Screenshot
- Directed by: Mannie Davis; George Gordon
- Produced by: Paul Terry
- Music by: Philip A. Scheib
- Animation by: Carlo Vinci
- Color process: Black and white
- Production company: Terrytoons
- Distributed by: 20th Century Fox
- Release date: March 5, 1937
- Running time: 6:04
- Language: English

Red Hot Music is a 1937 animated short produced by Terrytoons, starring Kiko the Kangaroo. It is the fifth cartoon in the character's series. In the Castle Films reissue, the cartoon was retitled Red Hot Rhythm!

== Plot ==
The film starts in a radio station building which is, for some reason, named after Kiko. Inside, an orchestra is performing upbeat jazz music. Their melody is well received by everybody just outside. As the musicians work hard on their performance, fires mysteriously break out in the building.

At a nearby fire department, the alarm rings. The lead fireman, who is none other than Kiko the Kangaroo, leaps out of bed, and slides down the pole. He then heads his fellow firefighters toward the blazing building.

Kiko and the firemen arrive at the radio station on time, and begin to spray their water cannons at it. While he struggles to enter the building, Kiko retrieves the victims collected by his colleagues. When he finally gets inside, he finds the rooms flooded as a result of being heavily showered by the cannons. Kiko then finds a plug which he pulls, thus draining out all the water. After being carried out into the street by the current, Kiko celebrates his accomplished mission by conducting some music while his fellow firemen become his orchestra.
