= The Hay Ride =

- Directed by: Mannie Davis; George Gordon
- Produced by: Paul Terry
- Color process: Black and white
- Production company: Terrytoons
- Distributed by: 20th Century Fox
- Release date: April 2, 1937
- Running time: 6:14
- Language: English

The Hay Ride is a 1937 short animated film produced by Terrytoons, and is the sixth of the nine cartoons featuring Kiko the Kangaroo. It was released years later for home viewing by Castle Films with the alternate title of Danger on Ice.

== Plot ==
It is winter time in the outdoors, and everybody comes to the frozen lake to do some skating. Also going there is Kiko who pulls his sled which his bear cub friends are riding on. While everybody else simply skate, Kiko and the bears play hockey. Despite lacking a goal to send the puck into, they are contented of just hitting it around. They are so focused in their game that they often obliviously collide with other skaters.

Having enough of their rugged play, a nearby police officer calls for their capture. Kiko immediately flees, pulling the sled with the little bears on it. The police pursues them for several yards. On the way, the kangaroo and the cubs find a shed which they hide themselves in. When the police go way past the shed, Kiko and the little bears joyously come out.
