= Play Ball (film) =

- Directed by: Mannie Davis; George Gordon
- Produced by: Paul Terry
- Color process: Black and white
- Production company: Terrytoons
- Distributed by: 20th Century Fox
- Release date: June 11, 1937
- Running time: 6:19
- Language: English

Play Ball is a 1937 animated short film by Terrytoons. It is the penultimate film featuring Kiko the Kangaroo. In reissue prints, the film goes by its alternate title Kiko at the Bat!

== Plot ==
Kiko is a baseball player who leads a team of joeys at the baseball diamond. Their opponents are a team consists of various other animals.

The other team is first to bat. Their first batter, an ostrich, is out immediately after failing to hit the ball three times in a row. Their second batter who is a spider monkey, however, manages to score a home run on first hit. Their third batter, a pig, also scores a point on first attempt. Their fourth batter, an elephant, hits the ball so hard and sends it a great distance but Kiko's team manages to catch it, thus preventing a third score.

Finally Kiko's team gets to bat. One of the joeys is first in being the batter, and misses on first attempt, but that joey manages to hit the ball on second attempt despite a sneaky trick from the spider monkey who is now the pitcher. The joey also makes it safe after running back and forth between bases.

Next, Kiko becomes the batter. As Kiko hits the ball and runs to the bases, a joey jumps out his shorts, and another one jumps out of that joey's shorts, and so on, all of which are going in the same direction. The ostrich in the outfield tries to catch the ball, only to accidentally swallow it. While the players in the other team struggle to extract the ball from the ostrich's esophagus, Kiko and the joeys continue to run on the bases, scoring multiple points.
