= Kiko the Kangaroo =

Fictional kangaroo created by Terrytoons

Cover for film set package.

Kiko the Kangaroo is a fictional kangaroo appearing in theatrical cartoons produced by Terrytoons. He is featured in ten cartoons made between 1936 and 1937.

== Fictional biography ==
As with various anthropomorphic animals at the time, Kiko wears shorts and shoes. While he does not speak, the marsupial is skilled in hand-to-hand fighting, and would use his prowess to defend his troubled friends or subdue an opponent in a boxing match. He can also use his tail for various purposes.

Kiko was created by Terrytoons in a desperate attempt to rival characters of other studios. He first appeared in Farmer Al Falfa's Prize Package as a pet sent to the farmer by the latter's brother. Since then, the kangaroo would spend the rest of his short theatrical run in a series of his own. After only ten cartoons were released, plans were made to create another cartoon featuring him, only to be not approved by Paul Terry.

Kiko is also among the few characters of the studio to have a theme song. He also has merchandise including plush toys.

== Filmography ==
Below is a list of films in their original titles. Some of them later came with alternate names when distributed by other companies like Castle Films.

Film	Release date
Farmer Al Falfa's Prize Package	July 31, 1936
Kiko and the Honey Bears	August 21, 1936
Kiko Foils the Fox	October 2, 1936
A Battle Royal	October 30, 1936
Skunked Again	December 25, 1936
Red Hot Music	March 5, 1937
The Hay Ride	April 12, 1937
Ozzie Ostrich Comes to Town	May 28, 1937
Play Ball	June 11, 1937
Kiko's Cleaning Day	September 17, 1937
