= Official Films =

Producer and distributor of 8- & 16-mm movies

Official Films Incorporated
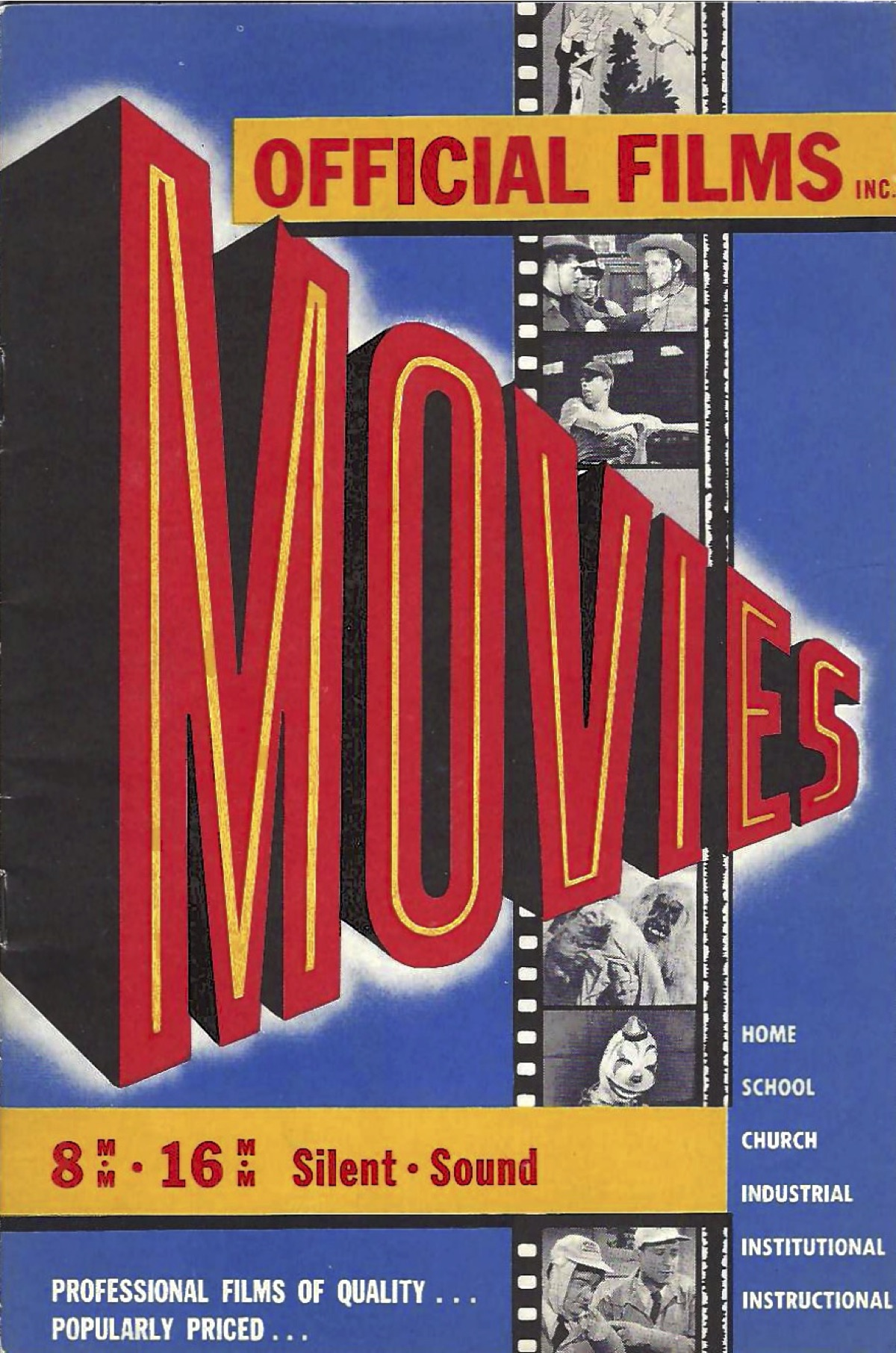
- Official Films Catalogue (1949)
- Formerly: Official Industries (1969 — 1971)
- Type: Private
- Industry: Home Movie; Television
- Founded: 1939
- Founder: Leslie Winik
- Defunct: Late-1980’s
- Fate: Acquired By International Creative Exchange

Official Films, Incorporated (Inc.) was founded by Leslie Winik in 1939 to produce educational shorts. Soon, after buying some negatives of public-domain Keystone Chaplin films, the company found itself in the home movie business.

== Home movies products ==
It obtained several dozen cartoons from Ub Iwerks and Van Beuren. Six Flip the Frog cartoons were released from the Iwerks studios (Castle Films would later license the Iwerks ComiColor films). These kept the original series and film titles. Official Films retitled the Van Beuren cartoons and changed the name of Cubby Bear to "Brownie Bear". The human Tom and Jerry characters were renamed "Dick and Larry" to avoid confusion with MGM's cat and mouse characters Tom and Jerry.

In addition to cartoons, Official offered sports films, newsreels (as the "News Thrills" series), and specialties including a souvenir film of the 1939 New York World's Fair (which remained available until 1980). Another Official perennial, also in continual release until 1980, was Broadway Handicap, originally released theatrically in 1935 as an audience-participation game like Screeno. Official's home-movie version adapted the set of horse-racing films into a family board game, with printed betting slips and play money accompanying the visual action of the films.

A popular wartime home movie was Schichlegruber [sic] Does the Lambeth Walk (Assisted by the Gestapo "Hep Cats"), an Americanized reprint of British filmmaker Charles A. Ridley's trick film Lambeth Walk: German Style (1941). Ridley re-edited clips of the Austrian Painter and German troops from the propaganda film Triumph of the Will, using back-and-forth reverse printing and special splicing to make it appear that the troops were doing the popular Lambeth Walk dance step.

Most of Official's home-movie releases were in the one-reel, 10-minute length, which was then the industry standard. The company experimented with longer-length, 20-minute subjects in the 1940s. A few independently produced musicals with Lena Horne or Ethel Waters were reprinted by Official. In 1945 Official issued some comedy shorts released theatrically in 1937-38 by E. W. Hammons's Educational Pictures; these starred Willie Howard, Bert Lahr, singers Niela Goodelle and Lee Sullivan, and Imogene Coca. In 1949, Official licensed a number of short subjects from Columbia Pictures; the two-reel, 20-minute comedies featured Andy Clyde, El Brendel, Buster Keaton, Charley Chase, Johnny Arthur and Tom Kennedy, and Johnny Downs. Official added other Columbia short subjects: cartoons with Krazy Kat and Scrappy, and "Community Sing" and "Famous Bands" musicals.

In the late 1940s, Robert R. Young's Pathé Industries acquired Official; through which it obtained home-movie rights to the Young-owned Producers Releasing Corporation's feature films. Most of these PRC subjects were issued as extra-length featurettes running 30 to 40 minutes each, including westerns retitled "Bronco Buckaroos" starring Dave O'Brien and James Newill, and Buster Crabbe and Al (Fuzzy) St. John, and mysteries starring Hugh Beaumont or Alan Curtis.

Official also purchased the backlog of the Soundies Distributing Corporation of America, releasing numerous three-minute musicals. Most were new reprints, issued individually or in three-film compilations ("Musical Film Revues"), but Official also sold used prints of Soundies that had seen service in coin-operated movie jukeboxes of the 1940s.

In 1950, Official licensed Hal Roach's Our Gang comedies for home-movie release; due to trademark conflicts involving the names "Our Gang" and "The Little Rascals", Official gave the series a generic name: "Hal Roach's Famous Kids Comedies".

== Television products ==
Official became an early syndicator of theatrical cartoons for television. The company also packaged its Soundies musicals for television, under the title "Music Hall Varieties." Official later also syndicated live-action television series such as Peter Gunn, Yancy Derringer, The Adventures of Robin Hood, Decoy, H.G. Wells: The Invisible Man, Mr. Lucky, The Adventures of Sir Lancelot, Four Star Playhouse, The Buccaneers, Colonel March of Scotland Yard, The Stu Erwin Show, My Little Margie, Rocky Jones Space Ranger, Deadline, and the original Biography during this period.

With the company concentrating on TV syndication, Official's home-movie operations diminished in the 1950s and 1960s; many older items were discontinued and few if any new titles were added, except for a silent 8mm documentary on Marilyn Monroe edited from "Biography." By the late 1960s, Official's TV syndication business had also dwindled, with an aging backlog of black-and-white shows and with no new series to offer; the company became inactive. Official Films continued to fill orders for its home-movie line until 1980. The catalog was then restricted to the company's all-time best-sellers, with many titles from the late 1940s still in print.

From 1969 to 1971, the company was known as Official Industries. In the late 1980s, Official Films was acquired by International Creative Exchange. In 1994, A&E acquired the original Biography series from ICE; A&E Networks also acquired Battle Line from ICE in 1999. The Official Films library is currently controlled by Multicom Entertainment Group and the Peter Rodgers Organization.

== See also ==
- Castle Films
- Hollywood Film Enterprises
