= Skunked Again =

- Screenshot
- Directed by: Mannie Davis; George Gordon
- Produced by: Paul Terry
- Color process: Black and white
- Production company: Terrytoons
- Distributed by: 20th Century Fox
- Release date: December 25, 1936
- Running time: 11:00 (silent print); 6:45 (sound print)
- Language: English

Skunked Again is a 1936 animated short produced by Terrytoons and distributed by 20th Century Fox, and is the fourth of nine cartoons starring Kiko the Kangaroo. When it was released for home viewing years later by Castle Films, the alternate title of On the Scent! was used.

== Summary ==
Farmer Al Falfa, Kiko the Kangaroo, and numerous other animals are on a trip to the North Pole. To get there, they board an airship at Lakehurst, NJ, which became famous a year later for being the site of the crash of the Hindenburg. Interested in joining their travel are two skunks who are on a small craft tied to the back of the airship. Al, who is the pilot of the dirigible, finds them unfitting and therefore disconnects their craft.

After such a voyage, the airship reaches the North Pole, and everybody on board comes out with their sleds and skis. When Al and Kiko ride their sled, they carelessly bash into a walrus and some dark birds who didn't take their moves too kindly. When the marsupial and the old man fall into a pond in the ice cap, they are then captured by the dark birds.

The dark birds put Al and Kiko on trial. The judge of the event turns out to be the walrus. While the dark birds are quick to give the guilty verdict, the two skunks, who were supposed to be left behind hours ago, somehow reach the area and come down by parachute. The dark birds and the walrus run away immediately upon seeing the little pole cats.

Al, Kiko, and their fellow travelers return to the airship and take off as they don't want to get into any more trouble with the locals.
