= On the Scent (installation) =

On the Scent was a theatrical form of olfactory art about the connection of smells and memory in a domestic setting which was devised and performed by Leslie Hill, Helen Paris and Lois Weaver. It was first performed at the Fierce! festival in Birmingham and subsequently went on a global tour with over 500 performances.
