= Kiko Foils the Fox =

- Directed by: Mannie Davis; George Gordon
- Produced by: Paul Terry
- Color process: Black and white
- Production company: Terrytoons
- Distributed by: 20th Century Fox
- Release date: October 2, 1936
- Running time: 6:15
- Language: English

Kiko Foils the Fox is a 1936 short animated film produced by Terrytoons and distributed by 20th Century Fox. It is the third film to feature Kiko the Kangaroo, and the second one where the character goes solo. The film was also reissued by Castle Films under the alternate title of The Foxy Fox!

== Plot ==
Kiko is playing his flute in the woods, and spending some time with the birds, especially three young ones in a nest. The father of the birds comes to feed them with some grapes. While they are having their meal, a vicious fox approaches and scales their tree. Fortunately, Kiko and the birds spot the fox on time as they begin pelting grapes, prompting the predator to retreat into a cave below the cliff.

It appears that the current day is the time that the young birds should be able to fly. They then take off from the edge of the cliff. One of them, however, still isn't ready, and therefore plunges into the bottom next to the cave. The fox sees this as an opportunity, and comes out. Kiko, upon noticing the trouble, jumps into the bottom and pounces on the fox. Kiko brawls with the fox but receives hits as well. Despite switching to defensive mode, the kangaroo is able to hurl the fox into a great distance.

Kiko celebrates his win by marching on a country road, and playing on his flute Yankee Doodle. He is also accompanied by some birds who are beating drums.
