= Farmer Al Falfa's Prize Package =

- Directed by: Mannie Davis; George Gordon
- Produced by: Paul Terry
- Color process: Black and white
- Production company: Terrytoons
- Distributed by: 20th Century Fox
- Release date: July 31, 1936
- Running time: 5:48
- Language: English

Farmer Al Falfa's Prize Package is a 1936 short animated film released by 20th Century Fox. It is among the theatrical cartoons, featuring Farmer Al Falfa and Kiko the Kangaroo. When released for home viewing by Castle Films, the film wore the alternate title of The Prize Package.

== Plot ==
Farmer Al Falfa is napping in front of his countryside house until he receives a letter. The letter is from his brother Hank who is sending him a pet named Kiko. Al is excited by this at first. Momentarily the package with the pet arrives, and it appears Kiko is a kangaroo.

Al seems dismayed about Kiko being a kangaroo. Nevertheless, he gives Kiko a decent welcome to the house as well as doing some shining on Kiko's shoes. After bathing inside, Kiko comes out to play with Al but the old farmer doesn't find the marsupial's antics enjoyable.

Moments afterward, a pack of cops confront Al and tell him it's "illegal" to keep a kangaroo. When they attempt to arrest him, Kiko brawls with the cops. Kiko then forces the cops back into their vehicle which the kangaroo then pushes further into the horizon. Al is most thankful and begins to adore his pet.
