= George Gordon (animator) =

American animator and film director (1906–1986)

- Born: September 2, 1906; Scranton, Pennsylvania
- Died: May 24, 1986 (aged 79); Apple Valley, California
- Occupations: Animator, director, storyboard artist
- Employer(s): Out Of The Inkwell Studios/Fleischer Studios (1926–1931); Terrytoons (1930–1937); MGM Cartoons (1937–1943); John Sutherland Productions (1945–1967); DePatie–Freleng Enterprises (1967–1980); Hanna-Barbera (1979–1986)
- Relatives: Dan Gordon (brother)

George Gordon (September 2, 1906 – May 24, 1986) was an American film and television animator and director of animated films. Starting in film in 1930, he animated and directed for Terrytoons and Metro-Goldwyn-Mayer and later on moved to Television in its early days. Gordon is credited with hundreds of cartoons from 1937 through 1983.

== Biography ==
Gordon began working with animation in 1930 at the Terrytoons Studio as an animator on the Jesse and James and Farmer Al Falfa Cartoons. Gordon was later promoted to a director on animations such as:

- A Bully Frog (1936)
- The Busy Bee (1936)
- Robin Hood in an Arrow Escape (1936)
- Farmer Al Falfa
- Kiko the Kangaroo
- Puddy the Pup

In 1937, Gordon left Terrytoons for the Metro-Goldwyn-Mayer cartoon department to work as an animator. He animated for Rudolf Ising's unit on the Barney Bear series, and The Milky Way which would win an Oscar for Best Animated Short Subject in 1940. He would also animate for William Hanna and Joseph Barbera's unit for the Tom and Jerry shorts. After Ising left MGM to join the Army Air Forces animation unit, Gordon would inherit his old unit in July 1942. He directed the short The Storks Holiday (his only credited short) and the short lived Ol' Doc Donkey series. He finished his tenure directing Barney Bear shorts until he left MGM in 1943.

After departing MGM, Gordon found employment at John Sutherland Productions. While there, he directed the animated short The Trainer Within. The film was preserved at the United States National Library of Medicine as of 1988. He supervised stories for the UPA cartoon Mr. Magoo. He also directed Your Safety First (1956). By the 1960s Gordon served as director for DePatie–Freleng's The Ant and the Aardvark series of shorts.

Gordon spent his final years at Hanna-Barbera, where he directed various episodes of The Kwicky Koala Show, Trollkins and The New Scooby and Scrappy-Doo Show.

George's older brother, Dan Gordon, worked for Hanna-Barbera as well. He had a daughter named Sally Lucas.

== Works ==
- Scooby-Doo
- Scrappy-Doo
- Casper and the Angels
- The Little Rascals
- Super Friends for Hanna-Barbera Productions
- Barney Bear
- Tom and Jerry
