= Castle Films =

American film company

- Castle Films logo, 1938
- Type: Private
- Industry: Home Movies
- Founded: 1918 (industrial films), 1937 (home movies)
- Founder: Eugene W. Castle
- Defunct: 1977
- Fate: absorbed by Universal Pictures; discontinued in 1984
- Headquarters: New York City, United States

Castle Films was a film company founded in California by former newsreel cameraman Eugene W. Castle (1897–1960) in 1918. Originally, Castle produced industrial and advertising films, and relocated to New York City. Then in 1937, the company pioneered the production and distribution of 8 mm and 16 mm films for home-movie use, starting with the phenomenally successful Hindenburg Explodes! (1937), a newsreel souvenir showing the recent airship disaster.

Castle Films became a subsidiary of Universal Pictures in 1947, and prospered until 1977. Universal then renamed the firm Universal 8, which lasted for seven more years. Competition from the new home video cassettes caused the home-movie enterprise to close in 1984.

== History ==
In 1937, Castle branched out into 8 mm and 16 mm home movies, buying newsreel footage and old theatrical films for home use. Castle's first home movie was a newsreel of the Hindenburg explosion. That same year, Castle launched his "News Parade" series, a year-in-review newsreel; travelogues followed in 1938. Castle also eventually compiled sports films, animal adventures, and "old time movies" excerpted from silent theatrical films. The films were issued as one-reel subjects, running about nine minutes, and as three-minute "headline" versions condensing the action. The films, affordably priced and packaged in customized cardboard cartons, were sold at camera shops, in department stores, and in mail-order catalogs. Castle Films were extensively advertised in national magazines.

Castle Films 1942 newsreel about the Doolittle Raid, Yanks Bomb Tokyo

Castle obtained home-movie rights to theatrical cartoons from several animation studios, including Terrytoons (1938) and Ub Iwerks (1941). During World War II it produced numerous documentary and training films for the U.S. armed services. In the late 1940s and early 1950s, Castle released a series of 16 mm "Music Albums" assembled from the Soundies musical shorts, combining three 3-minute songs into each nine-minute subject.

Castle Films distributed two dozen Christmas subjects between 1939 and 1959, the first being Christmas-Time in Toyland (1939) and the last being The First Christmas (1959). The perennial in this category was The Night Before Christmas (1946), a live-action dramatization of the poem; it remained in print for 26 years.

=== Subsidiary of Universal ===
United World Films, Inc., the non-theatrical subsidiary of Universal Pictures, purchased a majority stake in Castle Films. Both Universal and Castle announced that the companies were merging, but in fact Universal took control on January 1, 1947. Eugene Castle became vice president of United World, but resigned in 1949. Castle Films thus became the brand name of the United World subsidiary, and began drawing upon Universal's library of vintage films (with Abbott and Costello, W. C. Fields, Boris Karloff, James Stewart, and other popular stars). The Universal ownership also brought to Castle many cartoons produced by Walter Lantz, with Woody Woodpecker, Andy Panda, Oswald Rabbit, and Chilly Willy.

In the 1950s, Castle released a highly successful series of Hopalong Cassidy excerpts, licensed from the series' star William Boyd. When Universal was purchased by MCA Inc. in 1962, Castle also gained non-theatrical access to the pre-1950 Paramount Pictures sound feature films owned by MCA TV division, releasing sequences from Cecil B. DeMille's spectaculars and Marx Brothers comedies, among other Paramount titles. Newsreels edited from NASA footage of U.S. space flights were timely in the 1960s.

Castle's most popular series was its line of science-fiction and horror films, many featuring the Universal Classic Monsters Dracula, Frankenstein, The Wolf Man, The Mummy, Creature from the Black Lagoon, and The Invisible Man. The series launched in 1957 and grew to 30 titles.

=== Name change, decline, and closing ===
Castle Films' name was changed to Universal 8 in 1977 and the new management experimented with longer-length films. Universal 8 dealt mostly in movie excerpts and shorts in the Super 8 film and 16 mm formats, along with six full-length feature films and a complete serial in the Super 8 format.

The advent of home video saw the establishment in 1980 of Universal Pictures Home Entertainment, which offered complete feature films on videotape. Between the then-high cost of silver (making motion picture film too expensive for casual consumers) and the popularity of home video, collectors abandoned the excerpts in favor of the complete films. Universal's home-movie division was now redundant with the home-video division, and the film subsidiary was discontinued in 1984.

== Competitors ==
The largest U.S. competitor of Castle Films was Official Films, founded in 1939. In the 1960s rival movie studios entered the marketplace: Columbia Pictures, then Warner Bros., United Artists, and 20th Century-Fox (all three releasing 8mm subjects under the Ken Films brand name).

== Legacy ==
The complete inventory of Castle Films (more than 1,000 titles over 40 years) is listed in Scott MacGillivray's book Castle Films: A Hobbyist's Guide.

== Landmark films ==
- Hindenburg Explodes! (1937), the first of the Castle home movies, originally released under the Pathé brand name and distributed by Castle
- The News Parade, an annual nine-minute roundup of the year's news events, issued from 1937 to 1975
- Christmas-Time in Toyland (1939), the first in a long series of Christmas releases
- Jack Frost (1941), first in a series of Ub Iwerks storybook cartoons, released in then-unusual Cinecolor
- The Chimp's Adventure (1943), first of the live-action "Shorty the Chimp" comedies (originally released in the 1930s by Paramount)
- Stampede! (1947), excerpted from a Rod Cameron western; first in a long series of "Hollywood highlights", almost always from Universal and Paramount
- No Indians, Please! (1948), first of Castle's very successful string of Abbott & Costello comedies
- U. S. Space Pioneer (1961), first of many space-exploration subjects
- Operation Tall Ships (1976), the last of the Castle Films

== See also ==
- Official Films
