= List of films directed by Tex Avery =

Tex Avery was an American animator, cartoonist, voice actor, and director. He became famous for producing animated cartoons during the Golden age of American animation and produced his most significant work while employed by the Warner Bros. and Metro-Goldwyn-Mayer studios.

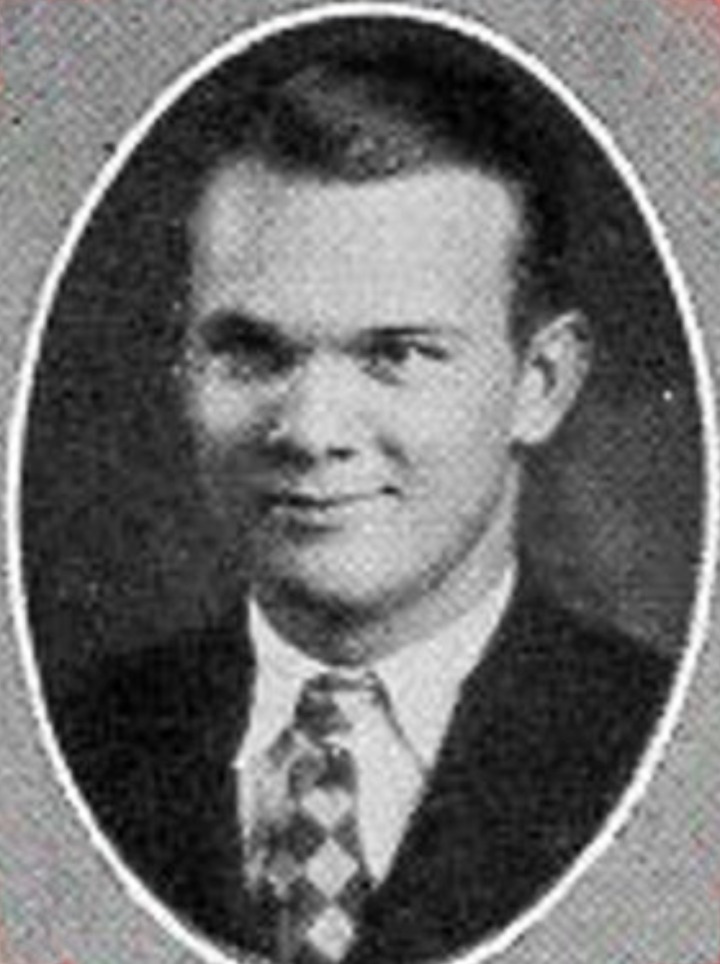
Avery in 1926

He created the characters of Daffy Duck in Porky's Duck Hunt (1937), Egghead in Egghead Rides Again (1937), Elmer Fudd in Little Red Walking Hood (1937), Bugs Bunny in A Wild Hare (1940), Cecil Turtle in Tortoise Beats Hare (1941), Droopy in Dumb-Hounded (1943), Screwy Squirrel in Screwball Squirrel (1944), George and Junior in Henpecked Hoboes (1946), Spike/Butch the Bulldog (Tex Avery's version) in Bad Luck Blackie (1949), and Smedley Dog in I'm Cold (1954). He developed the characters of Porky Pig from the Warner Bros. studio and Chilly Willy from Walter Lantz Productions into the personas for which they are best remembered.

Avery first began his animation career at the Walter Lantz studio in the early 1930s, working on the majority of the Oswald the Lucky Rabbit cartoons from 1931-35. He is listed as "animator" on the original title card credits on the Oswald cartoons. He later claimed to have directed two cartoons during this time. By 1942, Avery was in the employ of Metro-Goldwyn-Mayer, working in their cartoon division under the supervision of Fred Quimby. At MGM, Avery's creativity reached its peak. A burnt-out Avery left MGM in 1953 to return to the Walter Lantz studio. Avery's return to the Lantz studio did not last long. He directed four cartoons in 1954-1955: the one-shots Crazy Mixed-Up Pup and Shh-h-h-h-h, and I'm Cold and The Legend of Rockabye Point, in which he defined the character of Chilly Willy the penguin.

== Films directed or co-directed by Tex Avery ==
=== 1935: Carl Laemmle/Walter Lantz era ===
Title	Year	Notes	Ref(s).
Towne Hall Follies	1935	First cartoon directed by Avery at Lantz and credited as an animator; Co-directed by Walter Lantz	
The Quail Hunt	1935	Co-directed by Walter Lantz	

=== 1935–1942: Leon Schlesinger Productions era ===
No.	Title	Year	Notes	DVD/Blu-Ray Availability	Ref(s).
1	Gold Diggers of '49	1935	First cartoon directed by Tex Avery at Leon Schlesinger Productions.; Featuring Beans and Porky Pig	DVD: Looney Tunes Golden Collection: Volume 5; DVD: Porky Pig 101	
2	Miss Glory	1936	First color cartoon by Tex Avery, where he is uncredited.	DVD: Looney Tunes Golden Collection: Volume 6; Blu-Ray: Looney Tunes Platinum Collection: Volume 2	
3	The Blow Out	1936		DVD: Porky Pig 101	
4	Plane Dippy	1936		DVD: Porky Pig 101	
5	I'd Love to Take Orders from You	1936		Blu-Ray: Looney Tunes Collector's Vault: Volume 1	
6	I Love to Singa	1936		DVD: Looney Tunes Golden Collection: Volume 2; Blu-Ray: Looney Tunes Platinum Collection: Volume 1	
7	Porky the Rain Maker	1936		DVD: Porky Pig 101	
8	Milk and Money	1936		DVD: Looney Tunes Golden Collection: Volume 5; DVD: Porky Pig 101	
9	Don't Look Now	1936		Blu-Ray: Looney Tunes Collector's Vault: Volume 3	
10	The Village Smithy	1936		DVD: Porky Pig 101	
11	Porky the Wrestler	1937		DVD: Porky Pig 101	
12	Picador Porky	1937	First cartoon to have voices by Mel Blanc.	DVD: Porky Pig 101	
13	I Only Have Eyes for You	1937		Blu-Ray: Looney Tunes Collector's Choice: Volume 3	
14	Porky's Duck Hunt	1937	First appearance of the character Daffy Duck.	DVD: The Essential Daffy Duck; DVD: Porky Pig 101; Blu-Ray: Looney Tunes Collector's Vault: Volume 1	
15	Ain't We Got Fun	1937		DVD: The Life of Emile Zola (bonus feature, unrestored)	
16	Uncle Tom's Bungalow	1937	Part of the Censored Eleven.		
17	Egghead Rides Again	1937	First appearance of Egghead.	Blu-Ray: Looney Tunes Collector's Choice: Volume 3	
18	A Sunbonnet Blue	1937		Blu-Ray: The Prince and the Pauper (bonus feature, restored)	
19	Porky's Garden	1937		DVD: Porky Pig 101	
20	I Wanna Be a Sailor	1937		Blu-Ray: Looney Tunes Collector's Choice: Volume 2	
21	Little Red Walking Hood	1937	First appearance of Elmer Fudd.	DVD: Looney Tunes Golden Collection: Volume 5	
22	Daffy Duck & Egghead	1938		DVD: Looney Tunes Golden Collection: Volume 3	
23	The Sneezing Weasel	1938		Blu-Ray: Looney Tunes Collector's Choice: Volume 4	
24	The Penguin Parade	1938		Blu-Ray: Looney Tunes Collector's Choice: Volume 2	
25	The Isle of Pingo Pongo	1938	Part of the Censored Eleven.		
26	Cinderella Meets Fella	1938		Blu-Ray: Looney Tunes Collector's Choice: Volume 3	
27	A Feud There Was	1938		Blu-Ray: Looney Tunes Collector's Choice: Volume 3	
28	Johnny Smith and Poker-Huntas	1938			
29	Daffy Duck in Hollywood	1938	Final Daffy Duck cartoon directed by Tex Avery.	DVD: Looney Tunes Golden Collection: Volume 3	
30	The Mice Will Play	1938		Blu-Ray: Looney Tunes Mouse Chronicles: The Chuck Jones Collection (bonus feature, unrestored)	
31	Hamateur Night	1939		Blu-Ray: Looney Tunes Collector's Choice: Volume 2	
32	A Day at the Zoo	1939	In the public domain	Blu-Ray: Looney Tunes Collector's Vault: Volume 1	
33	Thugs with Dirty Mugs	1939		DVD: Looney Tunes Golden Collection: Volume 3	
34	Believe It or Else	1939			
35	Dangerous Dan McFoo	1939		DVD & Blu-Ray: Dodge City (bonus feature, unrestored); Blu-Ray: Looney Tunes Collector's Choice: Volume 4 (restored)	
36	Detouring America	1939		Blu-Ray/DVD: Each Dawn I Die (bonus feature, unrestored)	
37	Land of the Midnight Fun	1939		DVD: Allegheny Uprising (bonus feature, unrestored)	
38	Fresh Fish	1939			
39	Screwball Football	1939			
40	The Early Worm Gets the Bird	1940	In the public domain		
41	Cross Country Detours	1940		Blu-Ray: Looney Tunes Collector's Choice: Volume 2	
42	The Bear's Tale	1940		DVD: Looney Tunes Golden Collection: Volume 5	
43	A Gander at Mother Goose	1940		DVD: Looney Tunes Golden Collection: Volume 5	
44	Circus Today	1940			
45	A Wild Hare	1940	First Bugs Bunny cartoon by Avery	DVD: Looney Tunes Golden Collection: Volume 3 (bonus feature, unrestored); DVD: Looney Tunes Golden Collection: Volume 4 (bonus feature, unrestored); DVD: Warner Bros. Home Entertainment Academy Awards Animation Collection (restored); Blu-ray: Looney Tunes Platinum Collection: Volume 2 (restored); Blu-ray: Bugs Bunny 80th Anniversary Collection (restored)	
46	Ceiling Hero	1940			
47	Holiday Highlights	1940		DVD: Bugs Bunny's Cupid Capers (bonus feature, unrestored); Blu-Ray: Mr. and Mrs. Smith (bonus feature, restored)	
48	Wacky Wild Life	1940			
49	Of Fox and Hounds	1940	First appearance of Willoughby.	Blu-Ray: Looney Tunes Collector's Vault: Volume 1	
50	The Crackpot Quail	1941	The raspberry noises the quail makes in this cartoon were replaced with whistles instead; the audio track was found by Warner Bros. and restored.	Blu-Ray: Tex Avery Screwball Classics: Volume 3 (bonus feature, restored)	
51	The Haunted Mouse	1941			
52	Tortoise Beats Hare	1941	First appearance of the character Cecil Turtle.	DVD: Looney Tunes Golden Collection: Volume 2; Blu-Ray: Looney Tunes Platinum Collection: Volume 2	
53	Porky's Preview	1941	Final Porky Pig cartoon directed by Tex Avery.	DVD: Looney Tunes Golden Collection: Volume 5; DVD: Porky Pig 101	
54	Hollywood Steps Out	1941	Partially lost film.	DVD: Looney Tunes Golden Collection: Volume 2; Blu-Ray: Looney Tunes Platinum Collection: Volume 2	
55	The Heckling Hare	1941	Featuring Bugs Bunny	DVD: Looney Tunes Golden Collection: Volume 2; Blu-Ray: Looney Tunes Collector's Vault: Volume 2	
56	Aviation Vacation	1941			
57	All This and Rabbit Stew	1941	Part of the Censored Eleven.		
58	The Bug Parade	1941	Final cartoon that Avery completed by himself.		
59	The Cagey Canary	1941	Finished by Bob Clampett.	Blu-Ray: Looney Tunes Collector's Choice: Volume 4	
60	Wabbit Twouble	1941	Finished by Bob Clampett, who is credited in Avery's place.; Final Bugs Bunny cartoon directed by Avery until he started directing Kool Aid ads in the 1960s.	DVD: Looney Tunes Golden Collection: Volume 1; Blu-Ray/DVD: Looney Tunes Platinum Collection: Volume 2	
61	Aloha Hooey	1942	Finished by Bob Clampett.		
62	Crazy Cruise	1942	Planned by Avery and direction started by Bob Clampett after his departure.	DVD: Looney Tunes Golden Collection: Volume 5	

=== 1941: Paramount era ===
All films are in the Speaking of Animals series.

Title	Year	Notes	Ref(s).
Down on the Farm	1941	Co-directed with Lou Lilly.	
In a Pet Shop	1941	Co-directed with Lou Lilly.	
In the Zoo	1941	Co-directed with Lou Lilly.	

=== 1942–1957: MGM era ===
#	Title	Year	Notes	DVD & Blu-Ray Availability	Ref(s).
1	Blitz Wolf	1942	Rarely airs on television due to Nazi imagery.; First appearance of the Wolf.	DVD: Warner Bros. Home Entertainment Academy Awards Animation Collection (restored); Blu-Ray: Looney Tunes Platinum Collection: Volume 2 (bonus feature, restored); Blu-Ray: Tex Avery Screwball Classics: Volume 3 (restored)	
2	The Early Bird Dood It!	1942	First produced MGM cartoon directed by Avery.	Blu-Ray: Tex Avery Screwball Classics: Volume 3	
3	Dumb-Hounded	1943	First appearance of Droopy	DVD: Droopy: The Complete Theatrical Collection; Blu-Ray: Tex Avery Screwball Classics: Volume 1	
4	Red Hot Riding Hood	1943	First appearance of Red.	Blu-Ray: Looney Tunes Platinum Collection: Volume 2 (bonus feature, unrestored); Blu-Ray: Tex Avery Screwball Classics: Volume 1 (restored)	
5	Who Killed Who?	1943		Blu-Ray: Tex Avery Screwball Classics: Volume 1	
6	One Ham's Family	1943		Blu-Ray: Tex Avery Screwball Classics: Volume 3	
7	What's Buzzin' Buzzard	1943		Blu-Ray: Tex Avery Screwball Classics: Volume 1	
8	Screwball Squirrel	1944	First appearance of the character Screwy Squirrel.	Blu-Ray: Looney Tunes Platinum Collection: Volume 2 (bonus feature, unrestored); Blu-Ray: Tex Avery Screwball Classics: Volume 1 (restored)	
9	Batty Baseball	1944		Blu-Ray: Tex Avery Screwball Classics: Volume 1	
10	Happy-Go-Nutty	1944		Blu-Ray: Tex Avery Screwball Classics: Volume 3	
11	Big Heel-Watha	1944		Tex Avery Screwball Classics: Volume 1	
12	The Screwy Truant	1945		Blu-Ray: Tex Avery Screwball Classics: Volume 1	
13	The Shooting of Dan McGoo	1945		DVD: Droopy: The Complete Theatrical Collection; Blu-Ray: Tex Avery Screwball Classics: Volume 3	
14	Jerky Turkey	1945	In the public domain.	Blu-Ray: Tex Avery Screwball Classics: Volume 3	
15	Swing Shift Cinderella	1945	Working title was Red Hot Cindy during production	Blu-Ray: Looney Tunes Platinum Collection: Volume 2 (bonus feature, unrestored); Blu-Ray: Tex Avery Screwball Classics: Volume 3	
16	Wild and Woolfy	1945		DVD: Droopy: The Complete Theatrical Collection; Blu-Ray: Tex Avery Screwball Classics: Volume 3	
17	Lonesome Lenny	1946	Final appearance of the character Screwy Squirrel.	Blu-Ray: Tex Avery Screwball Classics: Volume 1	
18	The Hick Chick	1946		Blu-Ray: Tex Avery Screwball Classics: Volume 1	
19	Northwest Hounded Police	1946		DVD: Droopy: The Complete Theatrical Collection; Blu-Ray: Tex Avery Screwball Classics: Volume 3	
20	Henpecked Hoboes	1946	First appearance of the characters George and Junior.	DVD: Till the Clouds Roll By (bonus feature, unrestored)	
21	Hound Hunters	1947	Originally titled What Price Fleadom during production, named used for another Avery cartoon the following year.	Blu-Ray: Tex Avery Screwball Classics: Volume 1	
22	Red Hot Rangers	1947		Blu-Ray: Tex Avery Screwball Classics: Volume 1	
23	Uncle Tom's Cabaña	1947	Banned from television due to racial stereotypes.	LaserDisc: The Compleat Tex Avery	
24	Slap Happy Lion	1947	A clerical error led to the reissued version's ending card being mixed up with the Tom and Jerry cartoon Smarty Cat.	Blu-Ray: Tex Avery Screwball Classics: Volume 3	
25	King-Size Canary	1947		Blu-Ray: Looney Tunes Platinum Collection: Volume 2 (bonus feature, unrestored); Blu-Ray: Tex Avery Screwball Classics: Volume 3 (restored)	
26	What Price Fleadom	1948	Sequel to Rudolf Ising's The Homeless Flea (1940).	Blu-Ray: Tex Avery Screwball Classics: Volume 3	
27	Little 'Tinker	1948		Blu-Ray: Tex Avery Screwball Classics: Volume 3	
28	Half-Pint Pygmy	1948	George and Junior are designed differently in this cartoon.; Final appearances of George and Junior.; Banned from television due to racial stereotypes.	LaserDisc: The Compleat Tex Avery	
29	Lucky Ducky	1948		LaserDisc: The Compleat Tex Avery	
30	The Cat That Hated People	1948	First appearance of the character Blackie.	Blu-Ray: Tex Avery Screwball Classics: Volume 2	
31	Bad Luck Blackie	1949		Blu-Ray: Looney Tunes Platinum Collection: Volume 2 (bonus feature, unrestored); Blu-Ray: Tex Avery Screwball Classics: Volume 1 (restored)	
32	Señor Droopy	1949	First cartoon in which the character Droopy is named as such.	DVD: Droopy: The Complete Theatrical Collection; Blu-Ray: Looney Tunes Platinum Collection: Volume 2 (bonus feature, unrestored); Blu-Ray: Tex Avery Screwball Classics: Volume 3 (restored)	
33	The House of Tomorrow	1949		Blu-Ray: Tex Avery Screwball Classics: Volume 2	
34	Doggone Tired	1949	In the public domain	Blu-Ray: Tex Avery Screwball Classics: Volume 2	
35	Wags to Riches	1949	First appearance of the character Butch.; Later got a CinemaScope remake called Millionaire Droopy.	DVD: Droopy: The Complete Theatrical Collection; Blu-Ray: Looney Tunes Platinum Collection: Volume 2 (bonus feature, unrestored); Blu-Ray: Tex Avery Screwball Classics: Volume 1 (restored)	
36	Little Rural Riding Hood	1949	Last appearance of Red.	Blu-Ray: Tex Avery Screwball Classics: Volume 2	
37	Out-Foxed	1949		DVD: Droopy: The Complete Theatrical Collection; Blu-Ray: Tex Avery Screwball Classics: Volume 2	
38	The Counterfeit Cat	1949		Blu-Ray: Tex Avery Screwball Classics: Volume 2	
39	Ventriloquist Cat	1950	Later got a CinemaScope remake titled Cat's Meow.	Blu-Ray: Tex Avery Screwball Classics: Volume 2	
40	The Cuckoo Clock	1950		Blu-Ray: Tex Avery Screwball Classics: Volume 2	
41	Garden Gopher	1950		Blu-Ray: Tex Avery Screwball Classics: Volume 1	
42	The Chump Champ	1950		DVD: Droopy: The Complete Theatrical Collection; Blu-Ray: Tex Avery Screwball Classics: Volume 1	
43	The Peachy Cobbler	1951		Blu-Ray: Tex Avery Screwball Classics: Volume 1	
44	Cock-a-Doodle Dog	1951		Blu-Ray: Tex Avery Screwball Classics: Volume 3	
45	Daredevil Droopy	1951		DVD: Droopy: The Complete Theatrical Collection; Blu-Ray: Tex Avery Screwball Classics: Volume 1	
46	Droopy's Good Deed	1951		DVD: Droopy: The Complete Theatrical Collection	
47	Symphony in Slang	1951		Blu-Ray: Looney Tunes Platinum Collection: Volume 2 (bonus feature, unrestored); Blu-Ray: Tex Avery Screwball Classics: Volume 1 (restored)	
48	Car of Tomorrow	1951		Blu-Ray: Tex Avery Screwball Classics: Volume 2	
49	Droopy's Double Trouble	1951		DVD: Droopy: The Complete Theatrical Collection; Blu-Ray: Tex Avery Screwball Classics: Volume 2	
50	Magical Maestro	1952		Blu-Ray: Looney Tunes Platinum Collection: Volume 2 (bonus feature, unrestored); Blu-Ray: Tex Avery Screwball Classics: Volume 2 (restored)	
51	One Cab's Family	1952		Blu-Ray: Tex Avery Screwball Classics: Volume 2	
52	Rock-a-Bye Bear	1952	Final cartoon directed by Avery before his year-long sabbatical.	Blu-Ray: Looney Tunes Platinum Collection: Volume 2 (bonus feature, unrestored); Blu-Ray: Tex Avery Screwball Classics: Volume 3 (restored)	
53	Little Johnny Jet	1953	First cartoon directed by Avery after return from his sabbatical.	DVD: Warner Bros. Home Entertainment Academy Awards Animation Collection; Blu-Ray: Tex Avery Screwball Classics: Volume 3	
54	T.V. of Tomorrow	1953		Blu-Ray: Tex Avery Screwball Classics: Volume 2	
55	The Three Little Pups	1953	First appearance of the Southern Wolf.; Final live-action/animated cartoon.	DVD: Droopy: The Complete Theatrical Collection; Blu-Ray: Tex Avery Screwball Classics: Volume 2	
56	Drag-a-Long Droopy	1954		DVD: Droopy: The Complete Theatrical Collection; Blu-Ray: Tex Avery Screwball Classics: Volume 2	
57	Billy Boy	1954	Started by Dick Lundy as a prospective Barney Bear cartoon, but reworked by Avery upon his return.	Blu-Ray: Tex Avery Screwball Classics: Volume 3	
58	Homesteader Droopy	1954		DVD: Droopy: The Complete Theatrical Collection; Blu-Ray: Tex Avery Screwball Classics: Volume 2	
59	The Farm of Tomorrow	1954		Blu-Ray: Tex Avery Screwball Classics: Volume 2	
60	The Flea Circus	1954		Blu-Ray: Tex Avery Screwball Classics: Volume 2	
61	Dixieland Droopy	1954		DVD: Droopy: The Complete Theatrical Collection; Blu-Ray: Tex Avery Screwball Classics: Volume 2	
62	Field and Scream	1955		Blu-Ray: Tex Avery Screwball Classics: Volume 2	
63	The First Bad Man	1955		Blu-Ray: Tex Avery Screwball Classics: Volume 2	
64	Deputy Droopy	1955	Finished by Michael Lah.	DVD: Droopy: The Complete Theatrical Collection; Blu-Ray: Tex Avery Screwball Classics: Volume 3 (restored)	
65	Cellbound	1955	Finished by Michael Lah.; Last MGM cartoon directed by Tex Avery.	Blu-Ray: Tex Avery Screwball Classics: Volume 3	
66	Millionaire Droopy	1956	Credit only; CinemaScope remake of Wags to Riches (1949).	DVD: Droopy: The Complete Theatrical Collection	
67	Cat's Meow	1957	Credit only; CinemaScope remake of Ventriloquist Cat (1950).		

=== 1954–1955: Universal & Walter Lantz era ===
#	Title	Year	Notes	Availability	Ref(s).
1	I'm Cold	1954	A Chilly Willy cartoon.; First appearance of the character Smedley Dog.	DVD: The Woody Woodpecker and Friends Classic Cartoon Collection	
2	Crazy Mixed Up Pup	1955		DVD: The Woody Woodpecker and Friends Classic Cartoon Collection	
3	The Legend of Rockabye Point	1955	A Chilly Willy cartoon.	DVD: The Woody Woodpecker and Friends Classic Cartoon Collection	
4	Sh-h-h-h-h-h	1955		DVD: The Woody Woodpecker and Friends Classic Cartoon Collection	

=== 1979: Hanna-Barbera era ===
Title	Year	Notes	Ref(s).
Casper's First Christmas	1979	Credited as Musical Sequence Director	
