= Tex Avery Screwball Classics =

Blu-ray/DVD set collection of theatrical Tex Avery cartoons

Tex Avery Screwball Classics is a series of single-disc Blu-ray and DVD sets by Warner Bros. Home Entertainment's Warner Archive unit collecting various theatrical cartoons from animation director Tex Avery during his tenure at Metro-Goldwyn-Mayer's cartoon department between the years of 1942 and 1955. It is the first comprehensive collection of Avery's MGM shorts to be released on home media in North America since The Compleat Tex Avery series of laserdiscs in the 1990s, with many of the shorts having been previously unreleased on DVD or Blu-ray.

Volume 1 was released on Blu-ray on February 18, 2020, and on DVD on December 1 with 19 shorts, all presented uncut and digitally restored. Volume 2 was released on both Blu-ray as well as on DVD on December 15, 2020, with 21 shorts. Volume 3 was released on October 5, 2021, with 20 shorts. A four-disc set, Tex Avery: The Definitive Screwball Classics Collection, a complete box set containing the entire Avery library, the original release prints of The Shooting of Dan McGoo (1945), Wild and Woolfy (1945), and Lucky Ducky (1948), in addition to the Michael Lah Droopy cartoons, is in development and will release on December 11, 2026; Volume 4, containing 14 shorts individually, will be released the same day.

== Background ==
Tex Avery worked at Leon Schlesinger Productions directing Looney Tunes and Merrie Melodies shorts for Warner Bros. Pictures between 1936 and 1941. Here, Avery had developed the Looney Tunes signature style of cartoon humor and was essential in the creation and/or development of many of the studio's star characters, including Porky Pig, Daffy Duck, Elmer Fudd and most notably Bugs Bunny. In 1941, after a dispute with Schlesinger over the ending of the Bugs Bunny cartoon The Heckling Hare, Avery was "suspended" from the studio.

After spending a few months at Paramount Pictures developing a short-lived series of live-action comedy shorts named Speaking of Animals, Avery was hired by the MGM cartoon studio. Between the years of 1942 and 1955, Avery directed over 60 one-shot cartoons with only a handful of reoccurring characters such as Screwy Squirrel, George and Junior and Droopy. Many animation fans and historians consider this period of Avery's career to be his finest output and amongst the best cartoons of the Golden Age of American Animation. Five of Avery's MGM cartoons, Red Hot Riding Hood (1943), King-Size Canary (1947), Bad Luck Blackie (1949), Little Rural Riding Hood (1949) and Northwest Hounded Police (1946), were included in The 50 Greatest Cartoons book in 1994 as selected by 1,000 animation professionals. In addition, Blitz Wolf (1942) and Little Johnny Jet (1953) were nominated for an Academy Award for Best Animated Short Film in 1942 and 1952 respectively, and Magical Maestro was deemed "culturally, historically and aesthetically important" by the Library of Congress and was selected for preservation in the National Film Registry in 1993.

Throughout the 1980s and 1990s, MGM and Turner Entertainment Co. released VHS and LaserDisc collections of Avery's work, such as the Tex Avery Screwball Classics sub-series of Cartoon Moviestars VHS tapes, and The Compleat Tex Avery LaserDisc collection in 1993.

Throughout the 2000s and 2010s, Tex Avery's MGM cartoons were notably absent on DVD and Blu-ray. According to animation historian Jerry Beck and Warner Archive Senior Vice President George Feltenstein, this lack of availability was because most of the original film negatives to pre-1951 MGM cartoons were destroyed in the 1978 film vault fire at the George Eastman House leaving only inferior duplicate copies, mainly mid-1990s Turner broadcast television masters as seen on the Ted Turner-owned cable networks Cartoon Network and Boomerang that were unsuitable for HD releases. In France, a DVD box set containing almost all of Avery's MGM cartoons was released in 2002, sourced from the 1990s Turner remasters with many censored for racial content, including omitting two cartoons, Uncle Tom's Cabaña (1947) and Half-Pint Pygmy (1948). Several cartoons were also included as bonus features on various classic Warner Bros. owned feature films as well on the bonus disc of the Looney Tunes Platinum Collection: Volume 2 Blu-ray in 2012. In 2007, Warner Home Video released Tex Avery's Droopy: The Complete Theatrical Collection a two-disc set that collected all 24 Droopy cartoons, once again sourced from the Turner prints (except for a few post-1951 cartoons such as Dixieland Droopy and all CinemaScope shorts). The cartoons were uncensored but contained massive amounts of Digital Noise Reduction. The set was made to "test the waters" and see if there was a potential market for future releases of Tex Avery cartoons on DVD; however, poor fan reception and low sales forced any of these plans to be scrapped.

In January 2020, as part of a Warner company-wide initiative to restore and preserve its film library, Warner Archive Collection announced they were releasing Tex Avery Screwball Classics: Volume 1, a single-disc Blu-ray that collected 19 Tex Avery MGM cartoons. Unlike the previous releases, these cartoons were digitally restored using color reversal internegatives, separation masters and other second-generation film elements that were made when the cartoons were being re-issued in the 1950s, resulting in a much more clean and pristine image quality. However, some of the second-generation material to certain cartoons are also missing, hence why the shorts are arranged in a "best of" fashion rather than in chronological order. Warner Bros. conducted a worldwide search for the best available film elements of Tex Avery's MGM cartoons. In March 2020 due to the high sales of Volume 1, Warner Archive announced they were working on Tex Avery Screwball Classics: Volume 2, which was released in December 2020 containing 21 restored and uncut shorts as well as Tex Avery: The King of Cartoons, an archival documentary as a special feature.

According to Jerry Beck production on Volume 2 started in March 2020 with an entirely different selection of cartoons and was intended for a release date of June 2020. However, due to the COVID-19 pandemic, lockdown restrictions prevented the restoration team from working at their facilities, and were forced to use shorts that were already being restored by HBO Max independently - which was incidentally a completely different line up of cartoons than what the Warner Archive team initially had planned. The set had to be delayed from June to December because the initial restoration quality of the shorts done by HBO Max was so poor that it was deemed "unreleasable" and the transfers had to be sent back multiple times to be redone and fix the problems. Initially, 25 cartoons were planned, but only 21 of them lived up to Warner Archives' high standards and made the final cut. Since cartoons were not restored by the regular Warner Archive team when Volume 2 was released on December 15, 2020, the set received a somewhat mixed reception from fans noting some minor issues with DVNR, color correction, as well as titles being redone with Photoshop.

The next volume was delayed and at one point was put on hiatus due to numerous layoffs at Warner Bros. in January 2021, including George Feltenstein. As a result, most of the volume's production was done without his oversight and plans for using an original 35mm film print for The Shooting of Dan McGoo (1945) courtesy of animator Mark Kausler, and a documentary about the original titles to MGM cartoons featuring the original titles for Wild and Woolfy (1945) had to be cut. However, George was able to return in August of that year and has since taken back his role at Warner Archive. Volume 3 was released on October 5, 2021.

After the release of Volume 3, Warner Archive took a break from the Tex Avery Screwball Classics series to focus on other classic animated titles such as Looney Tunes Collector's Choice and Looney Tunes Collector's Vault. On October 12, 2026, Warner Archive announced a fourth volume of Tex Avery Screwball Classics consisting of 14 shorts, including the five previously unreleased Tex Avery MGM cartoons: Henpecked Hoboes (1946), Uncle Tom's Cabaña (1947), Half-Pint Pygmy (1948), Lucky Ducky (1948), and Cat's Meow (1957) — the latter being a CinemaScope remake of Ventriloquist Cat (1950) — made after Avery's departure, Droopy's Good Deed (1951) and Millionaire Droopy (1956), and the Michael Lah Droopy cartoons, as well as a complete box set containing all four volumes titled Tex Avery: The Definitive Screwball Classics Collection, which includes the original release prints of The Shooting of Dan McGoo (1945) and Wild and Woolfy (1945); both are scheduled to be released exclusively on Blu-ray on December 11, 2026.

== Tex Avery Screwball Classics: Volume 1 ==
Tex Avery Screwball Classics: Volume 1
- Directed by: Tex Avery
- Written by: Heck Allen; Rich Hogan
- Produced by: Fred Quimby
- Starring: Bill Thompson; Frank Graham; Dick Nelson; Wally Maher; Sara Berner; Tex Avery
- Music by: Scott Bradley
- Distributed by: Warner Bros. Home Entertainment
- Release dates: February 18, 2020 (Blu-ray); December 1, 2020 (DVD)
- Country: United States
- Language: English

Tex Avery Screwball Classics: Volume 1 was released on Blu-ray on February 18, 2020, and on DVD on December 1 with 19 shorts. All shorts are presented uncut (with a warning stating that the cartoons shown are products of their time and may contain jokes that, by today's standards, are considered racially insensitive) and digitally restored. The shorts are arranged in the following sections:

=== Tex Avery Screwball Classics ===
- Red Hot Riding Hood (1943)
- Who Killed Who (1943)
- What's Buzzin' Buzzard (1943)
- Batty Baseball (1944)
- The Hick Chick (1946)
- Bad Luck Blackie (1949)
- Garden Gopher (1950)
- The Peachy Cobbler (1950)
- Symphony in Slang (1951)

=== Screwy Squirrel ===
- Screwball Squirrel (1944)
- The Screwy Truant (1945)
- Big Heel-Watha (1944)
- Lonesome Lenny (1946)

=== George and Junior ===
- Hound Hunters (1947)
- Red Hot Rangers (1947)

=== Droopy ===
- Dumb-Hounded (1943)
- Wags to Riches (1949)
- The Chump Champ (1950)
- Daredevil Droopy (1951)

== Tex Avery Screwball Classics: Volume 2 ==
Tex Avery Screwball Classics: Volume 2
- Directed by: Tex Avery
- Written by: Heck Allen; Rich Hogan; Jack Cosgriff
- Produced by: Fred Quimby
- Starring: Bill Thompson; Frank Graham; Daws Butler; Pinto Colvig; Colleen Collins; Carlos Ramierz; June Foray; Pat McGeehan; Sara Berner; Tex Ritter; Paul Frees; Tex Avery
- Music by: Scott Bradley
- Distributed by: Warner Bros. Home Entertainment
- Release dates: December 15, 2020 (U.S. Blu-ray and DVD)
- Country: United States
- Language: English

Tex Avery Screwball Classics: Volume 2 was released on both Blu-ray and DVD on December 15, 2020, with 21 shorts. All shorts are presented uncut (with a warning stating that the cartoons shown are products of their time and may contain jokes that, by today's standards, are considered racially insensitive). The shorts are arranged in the following sections:

=== Tex Avery Screwball Classics ===
- Little Rural Riding Hood (1949)
- The Cuckoo Clock (1950)
- Magical Maestro (1952)
- One Cab's Family (1952)
- The Cat That Hated People (1948)
- Doggone Tired (1949)
- The Flea Circus (1954)
- Field and Scream (1955)
- The First Bad Man (1955)

=== Droopy ===
- Out-Foxed (1949)
- Droopy's Double Trouble (1951)
- The Three Little Pups (1953)
- Drag-a-Long Droopy (1954)
- Homesteader Droopy (1954)
- Dixieland Droopy (1954)

=== Spike ===
- The Counterfeit Cat (1949)
- Ventriloquist Cat (1950)

=== Cartoons of Tomorrow ===
- The House of Tomorrow (1949)
- Car of Tomorrow (1951)
- T.V. of Tomorrow (1953)
- The Farm of Tomorrow (1954)

=== Special features ===
- Tex Avery: The King of Cartoons, a 1988 British documentary about the life and career of Tex Avery featuring rare artwork and interviews from Chuck Jones, June Foray, Heck Allen, Ed Love and Michael Lah.

== Tex Avery Screwball Classics: Volume 3 ==
Tex Avery Screwball Classics: Volume 3
- Directed by: Tex Avery; Michael Lah
- Written by: Heck Allen; Rich Hogan
- Produced by: Fred Quimby
- Starring: Bill Thompson; Frank Graham; Pinto Colvig; Wally Maher; Kent Rogers; Sara Berner; Pat McGeehan; Daws Butler; Paul Frees; Tex Avery
- Music by: Scott Bradley
- Distributed by: Warner Bros. Home Entertainment (Studio Distribution Services)
- Release dates: October 5, 2021 (U.S. Blu-ray and DVD)
- Country: United States
- Language: English

Tex Avery Screwball Classics: Volume 3 was released on both Blu-ray and DVD on October 5, 2021, with 20 shorts. All shorts are presented uncut (with a warning stating that the cartoons shown are products of their time and may contain jokes that, by today's standards, are considered racially insensitive). The shorts are presented in the following order:

- Blitz Wolf (1942)
- The Early Bird Dood It! (1942)
- One Ham's Family (1943)
- Happy-Go-Nutty (1944)
- Jerky Turkey (1945)
- The Shooting of Dan McGoo (1945)
- Swing Shift Cinderella (1945)
- Wild and Woolfy (1945)
- Northwest Hounded Police (1946)
- Slap Happy Lion (1947)
- King-Size Canary (1947)
- What Price Fleadom (1948)
- Little 'Tinker (1948)
- Señor Droopy (1949)
- Cock-a-Doodle Dog (1951)
- Rock-a-Bye Bear (1952)
- Little Johnny Jet (1953)
- Billy Boy (1954)
- Deputy Droopy (1955)
- Cellbound (1955)

=== Special features ===
- The Crackpot Quail (1941): a Merrie Melodies short directed by Avery whilst at Warner Bros., featuring its original 1941 soundtrack.

== Tex Avery Screwball Classics: Volume 4 ==
Tex Avery Screwball Classics: Volume 4
- Directed by: Tex Avery; Michael Lah; Dick Lundy
- Written by: Heck Allen; Rich Hogan; Jack Cosgriff
- Produced by: Fred Quimby; William Hanna; Joseph Barbera
- Starring: Bill Thompson; Frank Graham; Pinto Colvig; Wally Maher; Kent Rogers; Sara Berner; Pat McGeehan; Daws Butler; Paul Frees; Tex Avery
- Music by: Scott Bradley
- Distributed by: Warner Bros. Home Entertainment (Studio Distribution Services)
- Release dates: December 1, 2026 (U.S. Blu-ray and DVD)
- Country: United States
- Language: English

Tex Avery Screwball Classics: Volume 4 will be released on Blu-ray and DVD on December 11, 2026, with 14 shorts. All shorts are presented uncut (with a warning stating that the cartoons shown are products of their time and may contain jokes that, by today's standards, are considered racially insensitive).

- Henpecked Hoboes (1946)
- Uncle Tom's Cabaña (1947)
- Half-Pint Pygmy (1948)
- Lucky Ducky (1948)
- Droopy's Good Deed (1951)
- Caballero Droopy (1952)
- Millionaire Droopy (1956)
- Cat's Meow (1957)
- Grin and Share It (1957)
- Blackboard Jumble (1957)
- One Droopy Knight (1958)
- Sheep Wrecked (1958)
- Mutts About Racing (1958)
- Droopy Leprechaun (1958)
