= The Tex Avery Show =

American animated showcase series

- Title card seen at the end of the show intro
- Country of origin: United States
- Original language: English
- No. of episodes: 99

Production
- Running time: 22 minutes

Original release
- Network: Cartoon Network
- Release: June 2, 1996 – 2002

The Tex Avery Show is an American animated showcase series of Metro-Goldwyn-Mayer and Warner Bros. cartoon shorts prominently by animator Tex Avery (a.k.a. Fred Avery). In between the shorts, Don Kennedy gives short facts about the cartoons. The showcase premiered on the Cartoon Network in 1996 (not long after the Time Warner-Turner merger allowed for common ownership of all but four of Avery's cartoons), and ended in 2002, while reruns continued to be shown on Cartoon Network until it was taken off the air on April 11, 2004. It was soon re-broadcast on Boomerang. Some cartoons, like 1947's Uncle Tom's Cabaña, were omitted from the package as they were deemed offensive to some audiences.

== List of featured Tex Avery cartoons ==
- I Love to Singa
- Egghead Rides Again
- Hamateur Night
- Believe It or Else
- Dangerous Dan McFoo
- A Wild Hare
- Tortoise Beats Hare
- The Heckling Hare
- Aviation Vacation
- The Cagey Canary
- The Early Bird Dood It!
- Dumb-Hounded
- Red Hot Riding Hood
- Who Killed Who?
- One Ham's Family
- What's Buzzin' Buzzard?
- Screwball Squirrel
- Batty Baseball
- Happy-Go-Nutty
- Big Heel-Watha
- The Screwy Truant
- The Shooting of Dan McGoo
- Jerky Turkey
- Swing Shift Cinderella
- Wild and Woolfy
- Of Fox and Hounds
- Lonesome Lenny
- The Hick Chick
- Northwest Hounded Police
- Henpecked Hoboes
- Hound Hunters
- Red Hot Rangers
- Slap Happy Lion
- King-Size Canary
- What Price Fleadom
- Little 'Tinker
- Lucky Ducky
- The Cat That Hated People
- Bad Luck Blackie
- Sénor Droopy
- The House of Tomorrow
- Doggone Tired
- Wags To Riches
- Little Rural Riding Hood
- Out-Foxed
- The Counterfeit Cat
- Ventriloquist Cat
- The Cuckoo Clock
- Garden Gopher
- The Chump Champ
- The Peachy Cobbler
- Cock-a-Doodle Dog
- Daredevil Droopy
- Droopy's Good Deed
- Symphony in Slang
- Car of Tomorrow
- Droopy's Double Trouble
- Magical Maestro
- One Cab's Family
- Rock-a-Bye Bear
- Little Johnny Jet
- The T.V. of Tomorrow
- The Three Little Pups
- Drag-a-Long Droopy
- Billy Boy
- Homesteader Droopy
- The Farm of Tomorrow
- The Flea Circus
- Dixieland Droopy
- Field and Scream
- The First Bad Man
- Deputy Droopy
- Cellbound
- Millionaire Droopy

== See also ==
- List of programs broadcast by Cartoon Network
- Cartoon Alley
- ToonHeads
- The Bob Clampett Show
- The Popeye Show
- The Wacky World of Tex Avery
