= One Droopy Knight =

- Directed by: Michael Lah
- Story by: Homer Brightman
- Produced by: William Hanna; Joseph Barbera
- Starring: Bill Thompson (as Droopy)
- Edited by: Jim Faris
- Music by: Scott Bradley; Hoyt Curtin (musical supervisor, uncredited)
- Animation by: Ken Southworth; Irvin Spence; Bill Schipek; Herman Cohen
- Layouts by: Ed Benedict
- Backgrounds by: F. Montealegre
- Color process: Technicolor
- Production company: Metro-Goldwyn-Mayer Cartoons
- Distributed by: Metro-Goldwyn-Mayer
- Release date: December 6, 1957
- Running time: 6 minutes 49 seconds
- Country: United States
- Language: English

One Droopy Knight is a 1957 animated short subject in the Droopy series, directed by Michael Lah and produced by William Hanna and Joseph Barbera for Metro-Goldwyn-Mayer in CinemaScope.

== Plot ==
Essentially a remake of 1949's Señor Droopy, but taking place in a medieval setting rather than the country of Mexico, One Droopy Knight casts Droopy and his rival Butch as medieval knights out to slay a dragon and win the hand of a beautiful human princess. The dragon is merely inconvenienced by the knights' repeated attacks. Droopy's attacks are harmless, and receives little harm in return when the dragon evicts him. The bellicose Butch is dealt with more forcefully.

Eventually, both knights give up. Droopy laments his failure to a picture of the princess. The dragon draws a French moustache on the picture and laughs. An angered Droopy assaults and defeats the dragon. The camera pulls back from the scene of the fleeing dragon to show that it is framed within a book. The book is being read to the princess by Droopy. Droopy finishes the story, claims that the story is true, and kisses the princess' hand. He takes out a cigar, and the dragon appears from behind the chair to light it.

== Reception ==
It was nominated for an Academy Award for Best Animated Short Film in 1958, but lost to Birds Anonymous, a Sylvester & Tweety cartoon from Warner Bros.
