= Butch (animated character) =

Fictional character

- Droopy character
- Butch in the cartoon Grin and Share It (1957)
- First appearance: Bad Luck Blackie (early version); January 22, 1949; Wags to Riches (official version); August 13, 1949
- Created by: Tex Avery
- Designed by: Louie Schmitt
- Voiced by: Tex Avery (1949–1952, 1956–1957); William Hanna (1949–1950, 1952, 1955–1956); Sara Berner (1949–1950, 1952, 1956); Daws Butler (1950–1951); Bill Thompson (1951, 1957–1958); Carlos Julio Ramírez (1952); Frank Ross (1952); Mary Kaye (1952); Paul Frees (1952, 1955); Norman Kaye (1952); Mel Blanc (1952); Jeff Bergman (2000, 2010); Jim Cummings (2002); Joe Alaskey (2011–2016); Bill Farmer (2019–present)

In-universe information
- Aliases: Spike; Poochini
- Species: Dog (Bulldog)
- Gender: Male

Butch (formerly known as Spike) is an animated cartoon character created by American animator Tex Avery for Metro-Goldwyn-Mayer. Portrayed as an anthropomorphic Irish bulldog, the character was a recurring antagonist in the Droopy shorts, and appeared in his own series of solo shorts as well.

== History ==
A prototype of Butch first appeared in the 1949 short Bad Luck Blackie directed by Tex Avery where he antagonises a small kitten. In this short, he was designed as a large grey bulldog with a spiky collar and a hench build similar to that of Spike from the Tom and Jerry shorts. He would officially debut in the same year in the short Wags to Riches in his finalised design, being tan colored and slightly more anthropomorphised, where he would take on the role as Droopy's rival. From there on, Avery would continue regularly pitting the character against Droopy as well as featuring him in his own shorts such as being pitted against Blackie Cat (The Counterfeit Cat, 1949 and Ventriloquist Cat, 1950), a rooster (Cock-a-Doodle Dog, 1951) and keeping watch of a sleeping bear (Rock-A-Bye Bear, 1952). His name was officially changed to Butch in 1957's Grin and Share It as he was occasionally referred to as Spike. This change was made to avoid confusion with Spike from the Tom and Jerry cartoons (ironically the name Butch is also used in the Tom and Jerry cartoons for the name of a rival alley cat). All of the original 1940s and 1950s shorts were directed by Avery and Michael Lah at the Metro-Goldwyn-Mayer cartoon studio. Butch would not appear in new material again until Tom and Jerry: The Magic Ring in 2002.

== Filmography ==
#	Title	Release date	Director	Produced by	Notes
1	Bad Luck Blackie	January 22, 1949	Tex Avery	Fred Quimby	Prototype.
2	Wags to Riches	August 13, 1949	Tex Avery	Fred Quimby	First appearance with Droopy. Academy Award shortlisted cartoon.
3	The Counterfeit Cat	December 24, 1949	Tex Avery	Fred Quimby	
4	Ventriloquist Cat	May 27, 1950	Tex Avery	Fred Quimby	
5	Garden Gopher	September 30, 1950	Tex Avery	Fred Quimby	
6	The Chump Champ	November 4, 1950	Tex Avery	Fred Quimby	As Gorgeous Gorillawitz.
7	Cock-a-Doodle Dog	February 10, 1951	Tex Avery	Fred Quimby	
8	Daredevil Droopy	March 31, 1951	Tex Avery	Fred Quimby	
9	Droopy's Good Deed	May 5, 1951	Tex Avery	Fred Quimby	
10	Droopy's Double Trouble	November 17, 1951	Tex Avery	Fred Quimby	
11	Magical Maestro	February 9, 1952	Tex Avery	Fred Quimby	As The Great Poochini.
12	Rock-a-Bye Bear	July 12, 1952	Tex Avery	Fred Quimby	
13	Cellbound	November 25, 1955	Tex Avery	Fred Quimby	
14	Millionaire Droopy	September 21, 1956	Tex Avery; Michael Lah (uncredited)	William Hanna; Joseph Barbera	A CinemaScope remake of Wags to Riches. Despite Avery being credited, he had no involvement in this short.
15	Cat's Meow	January 25, 1957	Tex Avery; Michael Lah (uncredited)	William Hanna; Joseph Barbera	A CinemaScope remake of Ventriloquist Cat. Final short where he isn't paired with Droopy. Last as Spike
16	Grin and Share It	May 17, 1957	Michael Lah	William Hanna; Joseph Barbera	First as Butch.
17	One Droopy Knight	December 6, 1957	Michael Lah	William Hanna; Joseph Barbera	A pseudo-remake of Señor Droopy, Academy Award nominee. As Sir Butch-a-Lot.
18	Mutts About Racing	April 4, 1958	Michael Lah	William Hanna; Joseph Barbera	As Daredevil Butch.
19	Droopy Leprechaun	July 4, 1958	Michael Lah	William Hanna; Joseph Barbera	Final Golden Age appearance.

== Later appearances ==
Butch would re-appear in the Tom and Jerry direct-to-DVD films throughout the 2000s such as Tom and Jerry: The Magic Ring as an antagonist and Tom and Jerry Meet Sherlock Holmes, alongside Droopy.

His latest appearance was in 2014's The Tom and Jerry Show. He appeared in the episode "Double Dog Trouble", where Spike and Butch are two separate characters who are twins, in order to poke at the character's retitling, while detectives Tom and Jerry mistake each one for the other after Spike buys a room at the town's motel.

== Voice actors ==
- Tex Avery (Bad Luck Blackie, Wags to Riches, The Counterfeit Cat, Ventriloquist Cat, Garden Gopher, Cock-a-Doodle Dog, Daredevil Droopy, Droopy's Good Deed, Magical Maestro, Rock-a-Bye Bear, Millionaire Droopy, Cat's Meow)
- William Hanna (screaming in Wags to Riches, Garden Gopher, Rock-a-Bye Bear, Cellbound and Millionaire Droopy)
- Sara Berner (laughing in Wags to Riches, Garden Gopher, Rock-a-Bye Bear and Millionaire Droopy, screaming in Wags to Riches and Millionaire Droopy)
- Daws Butler (The Chump Champ, Droopy's Double Trouble)
- Bill Thompson (Droopy's Double Trouble, Grin and Share It, One Droopy Knight, Mutts About Racing, Droopy Leprechaun)
- Carlos Julio Ramírez (Magical Maestro)
- Frank Ross (Magical Maestro)
- Mary Kaye (Magical Maestro)
- Paul Frees (Magical Maestro, Cellbound)
- Norman Kaye (Magical Maestro)
- Mel Blanc (sneezing in Rock-a-Bye Bear (reused from The Hungry Wolf))
- Jeff Bergman (Cartoon Network bumper, Tom and Jerry Meet Sherlock Holmes)
- Jim Cummings (Tom and Jerry: The Magic Ring)
- Joe Alaskey (Tom and Jerry and the Wizard of Oz, Tom and Jerry: Back to Oz)
- Bill Farmer (The Tom and Jerry Show)
