= Daredevil Droopy =

- Directed by: Tex Avery
- Story by: Rich Hogan
- Produced by: Fred Quimby
- Starring: Bill Thompson; Tex Avery
- Music by: Scott Bradley
- Animation by: Grant Simmons; Walter Clinton; Michael Lah
- Backgrounds by: John Didrik Johnsen
- Color process: Technicolor
- Production company: MGM Cartoons
- Distributed by: Metro-Goldwyn-Mayer
- Release date: March 31, 1951
- Running time: 6:28
- Country: United States
- Language: English

Daredevil Droopy is a 1951 animated cartoon short, one of the few cartoons in which Droopy was paired with the dog Spike.

== Plot ==
When a circus arrives to town, it features its famous attractions, including "The Great Barko and His Famous Acrobatic Dogs". And under the commercial posters, an advertisement stands, titled "Dare Devil Dog Wanted", advertising a job for Barko's new dog-acrobats, under the condition "Must be Fearless!". This attracts both Droopy and Spike's attention to apply for the job.

Satisfied with the applications of the two dogs, Barko decides to put the situation on the competitive basis: "The one that gives me the best performance in strength and daring, gets the job!", to which the dogs agree. During the try-outs on every circus attraction – "see Simpson the Strong Man" test of strength, ringing the bell, "Pop the Balloons" shooting, "See a Woman Sawed in Half", "The Flying Human" flight test with a propeller on the head, riding a car through a solid brick wall, "The Sharp Shooter", juggling, riding on a motorcycle through a ring of fire, flying on the trapeze, tightrope-walking, figure skating and "The Human Bullet" shooting out of the cannon – Spike tries to outperform Droopy and sabotage his performances. But the former fails every time, and gets himself injured a couple of times.

During Droopy's final act, Spike tries to sabotage his competitor again, by burning his foot with a matchstick. But this leads Droopy to perform faster, leaving the audience to applaud. It also gives Droopy a minor burn on the foot. Impressed with Droopy's successful performances, Barko chooses the later to be one of his Acrobatic Dogs. Outraged for being rejected, Spike chops one of the trapeze poles to bring it down on both Droopy and Barko, but instead, it lands on Spike ("TIM- *crash* -ber."), leaving him the loser.

== Voice Cast ==
All voices are uncredited:

- Bill Thompson as Droopy
- Tex Avery as Spike (vocal effects)

It is currently unknown who provided the voice of The Circus Owner, but it is speculated to be either Shepard Menken or Stan Freberg.
