= Droopy's Double Trouble =

- Directed by: Tex Avery
- Story by: Rich Hogan
- Produced by: Fred Quimby
- Starring: Bill Thompson; Daws Butler
- Music by: Scott Bradley
- Animation by: Michael Lah; Walter Clinton; Grant Simmons
- Layouts by: John Didrik Johnsen
- Backgrounds by: John Didrik Johnsen
- Color process: Technicolor
- Production company: MGM Cartoons
- Distributed by: Metro-Goldwyn-Mayer
- Release date: November 17, 1951
- Running time: 7:07
- Language: English

Droopy's Double Trouble is the 11th animated short featuring Droopy. It was the first short to introduce one of Droopy's relatives.

== Plot ==
Droopy is presented here as a manservant working for an unseen master, who is going away for a few days with the head butler, Mr. Theeves. As they are packing the master's clothes, Mr. Theeves requests that Droopy acquire someone to help him around the house while they are away, and the first person to come to Droopy's mind is his identical twin brother, Drippy. Droopy contacts Drippy at O'Brien's Gymnasium and explains the situation to him.

Drippy arrives later on and displays his superhuman strength by punching his way through the front door before greeting Droopy. Droopy introduces Drippy to Mr. Theeves, who is briefly astonished by Drippy's uncanny resemblance to Droopy, immediately started jumping up to the chandelier, thinking he was seeing double. However, Mr. Theeves is relieved enough to come down from the chandelier and is also on the receiving end of Drippy's immense strength while shaking his hand. Mr. Theeves then explains Drippy's duties to him and tells him that no matter what, no strangers are allowed on the premises.

However, while Droopy loads the master's suitcase into his limousine, Spike the Irish Dog drops in and asks if Droopy can put him up for a little while since he has had little to no good luck recently. Droopy reluctantly agrees and has Spike go to the back door, but forgets to inform Drippy. As Spike snidely muses about taking advantage of Droopy, the back door opens, but what Spike is unaware of is that it is Drippy who has answered. Spike promptly demands, "Let me have it, pal," and Drippy responds by punching Spike across the terrace, musing "No strangers". Spike gets caught in a veranda which swings him back into the door as Drippy closes it. Droopy then appears and lets a bewildered Spike inside, but as Droopy fetches some food, Drippy comes back into the kitchen and hits Spike outside with the kitchen table. Droopy, unaware, take Spike's food outside, assuming Spike wanted to eat in the patio. As Droopy goes back for mustard, Drippy appears again and throws Spike down into the swimming pool, leaving him dazed. Droopy then rescues Spike, assuming he wanted to go for a swim, and takes him inside the house.

Droopy puts some dry clothes on Spike, but while he goes for some shoes, Drippy appears again and knocks Spike out cold. Droopy, assuming Spike was sleepy, tucks him in bed. Spike wakes up and begins to enjoy the comfort, but when he tries to call Droopy, Drippy responds instead and punches Spike into the bathroom, where Droopy is shaving. Spike accuses Droopy of assaulting him, but Droopy responds by recommending a cold shower for Spike. Strangely, Drippy goes for a shower as well and hits Spike out, stark naked. Droopy offers to get Spike some clothes, but this time Spike demands that he accompany Droopy. As Droopy enters a closet to get some clothes, Drippy appears from inside another right beside it and hits Spike with a baseball bat (referred to by Spike as a "shillelagh"). Spike angrily demands that Droopy hand it over, but Droopy denies having one, confusing Spike. Each time Spike puts Droopy in the closet, Drippy appears from the other and hits him. Now assuming that Droopy is responsible for hurting him, Spike demands that he stop, but Droopy denies having touched Spike all day. Now believing that Droopy may be going crazy, Spike discreetly calls for an ambulance.

When the ambulance arrives, Spike calls Droopy, but this time, both Droopy and Drippy answer. Shocked at the sight of "two Droopys," Spike goes insane and gets taken away by the ambulance.

== Voice cast ==
- Bill Thompson as Droopy / Drippy / Spike
- Daws Butler as Mr. Theeves / Spike (one line: "Ah, that's great, pal!")
