= Magical Maestro =

1952 film by Tex Avery

- Directed by: Tex Avery
- Story by: Rich Hogan
- Produced by: Fred Quimby
- Starring: Daws Butler (voices of Mysto and Cowboy, uncredited); Carlos Julio Ramírez; Tex Avery; Bill Thompson; Frank Ross (voices of Poochini, uncredited); The Mary Kaye Trio (Vocalists, uncredited)
- Music by: Scott Bradley
- Animation by: Grant Simmons; Michael Lah; Walter Clinton
- Color process: Technicolor
- Production company: MGM Cartoons
- Distributed by: Metro-Goldwyn-Mayer
- Release date: February 9, 1952
- Running time: 6 minutes and 30 seconds
- Language: English

Magical Maestro is a 1952 American animated short comedy film directed by Tex Avery and produced by Fred Quimby for MGM Cartoons. Distributed by Metro-Goldwyn-Mayer, the short was released on February 9, 1952. It features the Great Poochini (played by Butch Dog), a canine opera singer who spurns a magician. The magician is able to replace Poochini's normal conductor prior to the show through disguise. In 1993, Magical Maestro was selected for preservation in the United States National Film Registry by the Library of Congress as being "culturally, historically, or aesthetically significant", making it the only Tex Avery cartoon so far to be inducted.

== Plot ==
Attention-craving Mysto the Magician rudely interrupts a world-famous opera singer, the great Poochini (a pun on opera composer Giacomo Puccini), in the midst of rehearsal and asks to perform an opening act at the show that night. Mysto's tricks primarily come from his magic wand, which can summon flowers and rabbits. Poochini is not impressed by Mysto's tricks and kicks him bodily out of the opera house.

Mysto realizes that he can pass himself off as the orchestra conductor, using his wand as a baton, and get revenge on Poochini. As the performance begins, he freezes the conductor in place; steals his tuxedo, nose, and wig; and takes his place to conduct the music. As Poochini (performed by the Colombian baritone Carlos Julio Ramírez) sings the Largo al factotum aria from Gioacchino Rossini's 1816 opera The Barber of Seville, Mysto unleashes a variety of tricks with his wand. He begins by summoning rabbits and flowers and tricking Poochini into removing his own pants, changes his clothing several times, and causes him to sing in other styles (including a Chinese stereotype, a cowboy singing, "Oh My Darling, Clementine", a square dancer, and a Shirley Temple style child actor singing "A-Tisket, A-Tasket"). At one point, Poochini notices a hair protruding onto the screen (the "hair gag"; see below) and briefly pauses in his singing to pluck it loose and toss it aside.

An irate audience member in a balcony seat interferes with the performance three times. He first throws an armload of fruit at Poochini, turning him into a Carmen Miranda-esque singer, then sprays him with black ink from a fountain pen, causing him to sing tenor in the fashion of the Ink Spots. Finally the man drops an anvil on Poochini's head, crushing him to a shorter height and changing his vocals to a spoken bass line in a parody of the group's "Top & Bottom" format. After one rabbit washes the ink off Poochini's face with a fire hose and another one works his arm like an automobile jack to get him back up to full height, Mysto turns him into a Hawaiian singer.

In the final bars of the aria, Mysto's borrowed wig falls off and Poochini recognizes him. He takes the wig and wand for himself and levitates Mysto onto the stage when he tries to flee. Poochini uses several of the magician's own gimmicks against him in quick succession, with the curtain falling to flatten Mysto and his rabbits and end the cartoon.

== Voice cast ==
- Daws Butler as Mysto the Magician
- Carlos Ramirez as The Great Poochini (main singing voice - archival audio originally recorded for Anchors Aweigh)
  - The Mary Kaye Trio as some of Pocchini's comic voices
    - Mary Kaye as Carmen Miranda Poochini (Mamãe eu quero)
    - Frank Ross as Chinese, Square Dancer and Little Boy Poochini
    - Frank Ross and Norman Kaye as Hawaiian singers
  - Daws Butler as Cowboy Poochini (Oh My Darling, Clementine)
  - Bill Thompson as blackface tenor Poochini
  - Danny Webb as blackface bass Poochini
- Tex Avery as Poochini's speaking voice for a single line: "NO!"

== History ==
The concept of cartoons with insinuating situations is hardly new—Tex Avery especially featured a few quick jokes of this nature in his cartoons. Magical Maestro, for example, shows Poochini with a male and female rabbit on each arm. He lowers his arms behind his back and when he raises them again, he now has an additional dozen baby rabbits on them, six on each arm.

This cartoon features a gimmick only seen in Tex Avery films, the "hair gag". If a film loaded into a projector at a movie theater had acquired some dirt and dust while being handled, a fragment of hair or fiber could become caught in the projector gate and would sometimes skitter and move, causing the image of a gigantic hair to appear on the screen. While singing, Poochini notices a hair on the bottom edge of the screen and pauses briefly to pluck it and toss it aside, one of many ways in which Avery's characters broke the fourth wall. The gag had previously been used in the 1941 short Aviation Vacation, also directed by Avery.

The role of Poochini is portrayed by Butch the Irish dog, a frequent star of Avery's cartoons of that era (often alongside Droopy).

== Influence ==
The "hair gag" would later be used by English comedian Benny Hill in the closing chase sequence of his April 25, 1984 show. As he is being chased by medical staff and an ambulance in and around a hospital area, he notices a hair moving around the bottom right corner of the screen, and at a certain point stops his pursuers long enough for him to pluck the hair out before the chase resumes.

The Tom and Jerry Tales episode "Way-Off Broadway" features a gag similar to Poochini's transformations, in that Tom is forced to adapt to various pieces of music when Jerry changes them on a radio.

== Availability ==
- Tex Avery Screwball Classics: Volume 2 (Blu-Ray)

== See also ==
- Long-Haired Hare, a 1949 Warner Brothers cartoon directed by Chuck Jones that also features an opera singer being tormented by an enemy posing as a conductor during a recital
