= The Counterfeit Cat =

- Directed by: Tex Avery
- Story by: Rich Hogan; Jack Cosgriff
- Produced by: Fred Quimby
- Starring: Tex Avery; Bill Thompson; Colleen Collins
- Music by: Scott Bradley
- Animation by: Walter Clinton; Michael Lah; Grant Simmons; Louie Schmitt
- Backgrounds by: John Didrik Johnsen
- Color process: Technicolor
- Production company: MGM Cartoons
- Distributed by: Metro-Goldwyn-Mayer
- Release date: December 24, 1949
- Running time: 7 minutes
- Country: United States
- Language: English

The Counterfeit Cat is a 1949 animated short film directed by Tex Avery and produced by Fred Quimby for MGM Cartoons. Distributed by Metro-Goldwyn-Mayer, the short was released in the US on December 24, 1949. The short stars Blackie the Cat, Spike, The Canary and The Lady of the House.

== Synopsis ==
Blackie the Cat steals the headpiece of a dog to deceive Spike and to catch and eat the yellow canary he is guarding.

== Voice cast ==
- Colleen Collins as The Lady of the House
- Bill Thompson as Blackie the Cat ("Bow-Wow")
- Tex Avery as Spike ("Me-Ow-Wow!")
- Marion Darlington as The Canary (re-used audio from Happy Harmonies)
