= The Haunted Mouse =

1941 film by Fred Avery

- Title card
- Directed by: Fred Avery
- Story by: Michael Maltese
- Produced by: Leon Schlesinger
- Music by: Carl W. Stalling
- Animation by: Sid Sutherland
- Color process: Black and white
- Production company: Leon Schlesinger Productions
- Distributed by: Warner Bros. Pictures
- Release date: February 15, 1941
- Running time: 7:45
- Country: United States
- Language: English

The Haunted Mouse is a 1941 American animated comedy short film directed by Fred Avery. The short was released on February 15, 1941. It is the first cartoon in the Looney Tunes series to not feature any pre-existing characters akin to the Merrie Melodies series, as well as the first cartoon with major contributions by prominent storyman Michael Maltese.

== Plot ==
A video in the restored version for the short.

A starving cat sees a sign that says "Ma's Place/Home Cooking/3 Miles". The cat follows the sign only to learn that the sign leads to an abandoned ghost town (population: 100 ghosts), with "ghost" puns like "Waldorf-Ghostoria" on a hotel sign and "Mr. Smith Ghost to Washington" on a theater marquee. He enters Ma's, now closed and haunted by the ghost of a mouse (somewhat resembling Jerry), who targets the cat in revenge for all of the cats who tormented him all his life. The ghost mouse convinces the cat to pursue the mouse for dinner, leading to a series of gags in which the mouse uses his phantom form to full advantage. The mouse's final gag, lighting the cat's foot on fire, backfires when the cat jumps in pain out a multiple-story window and dies; thinking he has won the fight, the mouse is shocked when the cat returns as a ghost, now on even footing. The cat begins chasing the mouse through and out of the town, dropping the population to 99 ghosts.
