= The First Bad Man =

- Title card
- Directed by: Tex Avery
- Story by: Heck Allen
- Produced by: Fred Quimby
- Starring: Tex Ritter; Tex Avery; June Foray
- Narrated by: Tex Ritter
- Music by: Scott Bradley
- Animation by: Walt Clinton; Michael Lah; Ray Patterson; Grant Simmons
- Layouts by: Ed Benedict (uncredited)
- Backgrounds by: John Didrik Johnsen
- Color process: Technicolor
- Production company: MGM cartoon studio
- Distributed by: MGM
- Release date: September 30, 1955
- Running time: 6 min (one reel)
- Language: English

The First Bad Man is an American animated cartoon directed by Tex Avery, and features narration by singing cowboy Tex Ritter. It was released by MGM on September 30, 1955.

== Plot ==
An unnamed narrator tells a story about the history of Texas set one million years ago, when Dinosaur Dan, the eponymous villain, terrorized the state. He rustles all the cattle (brontosaurs with the heads of Texas longhorns), and runs off with all the pretty women. The primitive Texans finally corner Dan in his mountain hideout, and cleverly chisel away the outer rock, leaving behind a small rock jail with Dan inside. The final scene shows the jail still standing in modern-day Dallas, and reveals that the narrator is really Dinosaur Dan, still in jail and sadly asking: "When are y'all gonna let me out of here?"

== Voice Cast ==
- Tex Ritter as The Narrator (Dinosaur Dan) / Caveman # 1
- June Foray as Nagging Cavewoman (uncredited)
- Tex Avery as Caveman # 2 (uncredited)

== Notes ==
- Ed Benedict provided uncredited layout designs for this cartoon. Benedict would later work for Hanna-Barbera Studios (which was started by MGM alumni William Hanna and Joseph Barbera), where he would use some of the caveman designs from this cartoon as the basis for characters in The Flintstones.
- The Wacky World of Tex Avery used this short as the primary inspiration for Einstone, one of the show's characters.
