= Aviation Vacation =

1941 film by Fred Avery

- Title card
- Directed by: Fred Avery
- Story by: Dave Monahan
- Produced by: Leon Schlesinger
- Music by: Carl W. Stalling
- Animation by: Sidney Sutherland
- Color process: Technicolor
- Production company: Leon Schlesinger Productions
- Distributed by: Warner Bros. Pictures
- Release date: August 2, 1941
- Running time: 7 min
- Language: English

Aviation Vacation is a 1941 American animated comedy short film directed by Fred Avery. The cartoon was released on August 2, 1941. It is part of the Merrie Melodies series and the final cartoon to credit Avery, as he left Leon Schlesinger Productions over a dispute concerning the ending of The Heckling Hare.

== Plot ==
A small airplane takes its passengers on a world tour. Some excerpts:

- The plane, as well as its shadow, are remarkably flexible. The plane takes off like a bird, running and jumping and flapping its wings. The plane's shadow, seen from above, dodges ground-level obstacles.
- The plane passes Mount Rushmore, which is seen to also include the two major candidates from the 1940 election, Franklin D. Roosevelt ("For Democrats") and Wendell Willkie ("For Republicans").
- Two airplanes pass by each other, with the narrator staring at the passengers of the other plane, including a faintly recognizable Adolf Hitler.
- In Ireland, an Irish tenor (in rotoscoping) sings "When Irish Eyes Are Smiling", while a (cartooned) stray hair keeps appearing in the frame, as if stuck in the projector. The Irishman abruptly stops singing and yells at the top of his lungs to the projectionist, "Hey, you, up there! Get that hair out of here!" This joke was later reused in Avery's cartoon Magical Maestro (1952).
- At the darkest interior of "Darkest Africa", natives are listening to jungle drumbeats which are used for communication. One native asks another what the drums are saying, and the second native (illustrating the age of this kind of joke), responds, "Boop-ditty, boop-ditty, boop-boop-de-boop!" (This could possibly be a reference to Betty Boop.)
- Also in Africa, a native is using a blowgun, and is revealed that he was merely aiming at a practice target. His target calls him a "terrible shot".
- A group of ostriches hide their heads in the sand. Another ostrich arrives, perplexed, wondering where everyone went.
- A series of cocoons opens up, all of them producing beautiful butterflies, except for a weak and scrawny one: "Well, I've been sick!"
- The cartoon ends with the plane lost in fog while returning to New York City. When the fog finally clears, the plane is discovered to be attached to a carousel ride, and as it circles, "The Merry-Go-Round Broke Down" is playing. In this unique instance for a WB cartoon, the Looney Tunes theme segues into the Merrie Melodies theme at the fade-out.

== See also ==
- Looney Tunes and Merrie Melodies filmography (1940–1949)
