= Porky the Rain-Maker =

1936 film by Fred Avery

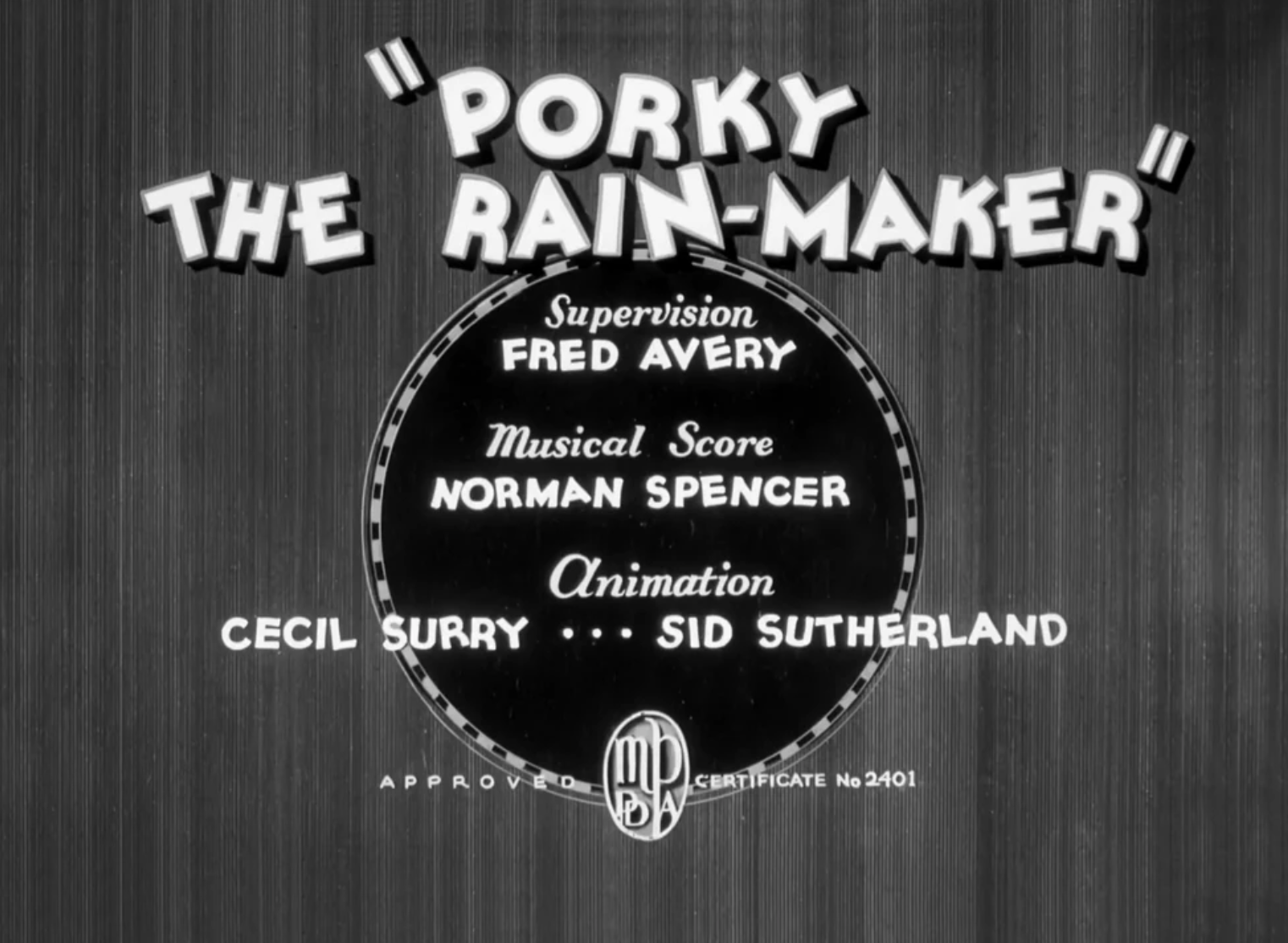
- Title card
- Directed by: Fred Avery
- Produced by: Leon Schlesinger
- Starring: Joe Dougherty
- Music by: Norman Spencer
- Animation by: Cecil Surry; Sid Sutherland
- Color process: Black and white
- Production company: Leon Schlesinger Productions
- Distributed by: Warner Bros. Productions The Vitaphone Corporation
- Release date: August 1, 1936
- Running time: 7 min
- Country: United States
- Language: English

Porky the Rain-Maker is a 1936 American animated comedy short film directed by Fred Avery. The short was released on August 1, 1936. It is the 73rd film in the Looney Tunes series and the eleventh cartoon to feature Porky Pig.

== Plot ==
A heat wave occurs and a drought ensues, causing crops in Phineas Pig's farm to wither humorously, including watermelons literally having the water inside boiled and eggplants cracking to reveal eggs that fry on the ground. To Phineas and his son Porky's horror, the animals go on strike due to a lack of food. Phineas instructs Porky to buy food for the animals with his last remaining dollar.

Porky walks to the animal feed store, but notices Dr. Quack trying to sell a set of weather pills for a dollar. He hands the crowd umbrellas and uses a rain pill, causing rainfall and confirming his pills to be legitimate. Porky buys a box and is angrily scolded by his father, who unintentionally drops the pills in front of the animals. A chicken eats the lightning pill and is electrocuted. A horse eats a fog pill and is confused by the effects, while a duck eats the wind and thunder pills and is thrown backwards. A hen eats a cyclone pill before Porky could pick it up, causing it to spin and lose its plumage alongside its tail to its disbelief, as well as an earthquake pill. The duck eats the rain pill, but Porky manages to allow the pill to launch to the sky and bring rainfall, which reinvigorates the plants and brings a great harvest, including a large amount of eggs from the hen. Porky and Phineas rejoice, only for the animals who had eaten the pills to act out again, including the duck who accidentally walks out of the iris shot and saved by Porky.

== Home media ==
Porky the Rain-Maker is available on disc 1 of the Porky Pig 101 DVD set.

== See also ==
- Porky Pig filmography
- Looney Tunes and Merrie Melodies filmography (1930–1939)
