= The Crackpot Quail =

1941 film by Fred Avery

- Title card
- Directed by: Fred Avery
- Story by: Rich Hogan
- Produced by: Leon Schlesinger
- Starring: Mel Blanc; Fred Avery
- Music by: Carl W. Stalling
- Animation by: Robert McKimson
- Production company: Leon Schlesinger Productions
- Distributed by: Warner Bros. Pictures
- Release date: February 15, 1941
- Running time: 7 minutes
- Country: United States
- Language: English

The Crackpot Quail is a 1941 American animated comedy short film directed by Fred Avery. It was released on February 15, 1941. It is part of the Merrie Melodies series and the second cartoon to feature Willoughby, who was redesigned to his current appearance.

== Plot ==
Willoughby stares at a billboard advertising dog food and aspires to be a great hunting dog as shown on the billboard. He chooses to hunt Quentin the California quail as a starter, only to spot one as he runs into a tree, a running gag throughout the film. Quentin is seen to emit a razzing sound involuntarily due to his lack of control of his topknot, who hinders his eyesight and breathing.

Willoughby sniffs his way to Quentin, spitting on him in an attempt to replicate the quail's razzing sound. Quentin deceives him by imitating actual quails before spitting into his ear once Willoughby realizes the situation. Quentin leads him underwater, using his topknot as a windshield once he emerges. Quentin is cornered, but improvises a distraction with a stick. Willoughby is angered, but he single-mindedly crashes through a hunting lodge and multiple trees.

== Home media ==
- LaserDisc - The Golden Age of Looney Tunes Volume 1, Side 3: Tex Avery
- VHS - The Golden Age of Looney Tunes Volume 3: Tex Avery
- VHS - Looney Tunes: The Collector's Edition Volume 8: Tex-Book Looney (1995 Turner dubbed version)
- Streaming - HBO Max (restored)
- Blu-ray, DVD - Tex Avery Screwball Classics Volume 3 (extra, restored)

== Razzing sounds ==
When this cartoon was originally released in theaters, the quail would constantly make a razzing noise in order to keep his top knot from falling down over his eyes. However, around the time the short was sold to Associated Artists Productions, the razzing noise was replaced by a whistle. The "whistle" version is the version that airs frequently on television. The original film remained lost until historian Mark Kausler tracked down a print with the original soundtrack; it was released as part of Tex Avery Screwball Classics: Volume 3.
