= Speaking of Animals and Their Families =

1942 film

- Directed by: Robert Carlisle; Jerry Fairbanks
- Written by: Walter Anthony
- Produced by: Robert Carlisle; Jerry Fairbanks
- Starring: Sara Berner; Mel Blanc; Pinto Colvig; Bernice Hansen; Kent Rogers; The Sportsmen Quartet
- Narrated by: Ken Carpenter
- Cinematography: Jerry Fairbanks
- Edited by: Robert Carlisle
- Music by: Edward Paul
- Animation by: Anna Osborn
- Distributed by: Paramount Pictures
- Release date: June 4, 1942
- Running time: 8 minutes
- Country: United States
- Language: English

Speaking of Animals and Their Families is a 1942 American short comedy film directed by Robert Carlisle and Jerry Fairbanks. In 1943, at the 15th Academy Awards, it won an Oscar for Best Short Subject (One-Reel). It is part of a series of Speaking of Animals short films featuring animals given voice via special effects. The film series includes Speaking of Animals: In a Harem and Speaking of Animals: Tails of the Border.

== Cast ==
- Ken Carpenter as Narrator
- Mel Blanc as Wolf (voice, uncredited)
- Kent Rogers as Hippo Baby (voice, uncredited)
- Pinto Colvig as Giraffe (voice, uncredited)
- Sara Berner as Hippo Mother (voice, uncredited)
