= Lucky Ducky (film) =

1948 film by Tex Avery

- Directed by: Tex Avery
- Story by: Rich Hogan
- Produced by: Fred Quimby
- Music by: Scott Bradley
- Animation by: Walter Clinton; Preston Blair; Louie Schmitt; Grant Simmons
- Layouts by: Louie Schmitt (uncredited)
- Backgrounds by: John Didrik Johnsen (uncredited)
- Color process: Black and White (scene only); Color (Technicolor)
- Production company: Metro-Goldwyn-Mayer Cartoons
- Distributed by: Metro-Goldwyn-Mayer
- Release date: October 9, 1948
- Running time: 7:38
- Country: United States
- Language: English

Lucky Ducky is a 1948 American animated cartoon from Metro-Goldwyn-Mayer. It was directed by Tex Avery, animated by Walt Clinton (here credited as Walter Clinton), Preston Blair, Louie Schmitt, and Grant Simmons, with musical direction by Scott Bradley.

This short was originally in development as a George and Junior entry, but was ultimately produced with two random dog characters instead of the two bears, who might share the same names as them.

== Plot ==
The foreword of the cartoon tells:

Dedicated
to those duck hunters
who leave at dawn
with loaded gun...
and come home late loaded...

Many ducks are swimming and flying around a pond. They are also doing a conga line around two dogs who were meant to be the two bears, George and Junior, but are now dogs, then are hunting, waiting in their boat, probably they're meant to share the same names as the two bears. Nearby at a tree, a sign reads "No Hunting Before 6:AM. As the clock finally strikes six, all the ducks fly away before the dogs have the chance to shoot one. Then the dogs spot a mother duck having her nest with an egg in it strapped to herself. The dogs fire, but miss the shot, then watch as the strap breaks, dropping the egg onto the boat and hatching. Just then, a small duckling appears, starts dancing and taking off the egg shell, and jumps into the water. George and Junior point their guns into the water, but hear that no shooting is heard. The dogs lift their guns, revealing that the duckling had tied the point of their guns together in a knot. The duckling laughs and jumps back into the water. The duckling goes under the boat and pulls out a drill and puts a hole in the boat. The dogs notice the leaking, and as the small dog covers the hole with his hands, water starts coming out of his ears, but are stopped by the large dog, who covers the small dog with his hands. Suddenly, water starts coming out of Junior's ears, and is stopped by the big dog, who stops the water by using Junior's nose like a faucet. George uncovers the hole, and the duckling honks his nose, laughs, and dives back in. The small dog points his gun into the hole, and tries to shoot the duckling, but fails when the duckling snaps it shut with a clip. The small dog pulls up his gun, but as the big lets go of the clip, the gun explodes in the small dog's face much to his chagrin. The duckling then lifts the boat and hits it against the water. The duckling laughs and swims away.

The small dog then heads to the motor, and tries to start the engine, but fails when it has problems trying to start. The large dog lifts the anchor and uses the small dog's head to start the boat. As the dogs chase the duckling at super-sonic speed, the boat's rudder blades cut the water in half, then the land in half, sinking a tree. Continuing the chase in the boat on dry land, the blades proceed to turn a log, two trees and a rock mountain into a bridge, staircase and ladder, and Mount Rushmore, respectively. The duckling and the boat go into a hole in a tree and go through another tree that has a hole. The duckling passes between two trees with the big tree suddenly lifting the small tree before the boat can do something to it. After crossing a muddy puddle and squeezing between two other trees, the chase temporarily ends with the boat and everybody crashing into a rock and getting flattened. Now chasing the duckling on foot, they stop upon a "Stop School Crossing" sign with an actual schoolhouse crossing the road. Chasing the duckling into a forest, everything suddenly turns black and white, the trio having passed a sign indicating "Technicolor Ends Here" where they go to have a look at it to read it. Going back into the color portion of the forest, the duckling stops at the edge of a cliff and spots Junior coming toward him and screams, prompting the duckling to pull out a bottle of "Quick Grow" and instantly turning a small plant into a tree which the large dog crashes into. The large dog then grabs an ax, and then puts it down to spit on his hands. The small dog comes back, and the large dog blindly uses him instead of the ax. The large dog notices this, and puts the small dog down. Then the small dog spits out a little pile of logs.

Back at the pond, the large dog is sniffing out the scent of the duckling who dumps pepper into the large dog's nose and places a pie in his hands. The large dog sneeze blows the pie out of his hands and all over the small dog's, the whipped cream and cherry filling looking like an outfit of Santa Claus.

The duckling jumps into a hole in a log. The large dog then reaches his hand into the log, but fails to catch the duckling, who makes a slingshot, slinging the large dog's hand into his head. The large dog then points his gun toward the hole, but fails to catch the duckling, as he pulls out a frightening mask, scaring and shrinking the gun, which screams and fires a shot and lets out some bullets. The large dog grabs the small dog's gun, and tries to shoot the duckling, but fails when it doesn't shoot. Junior pulls out the bullet and hands it to the small dog, who gets shot in the face, leaving him in blackface. Crossed, the small dog hands the large dog the bullet, which also got him left in blackface.

Next, the duckling leaves his footprints in the ground. The dogs's guns point to where the duckling is: in three different paths. The small dog then gets out a duck call, and blows to call for the duckling, but is shocked when the duckling answers back with a smaller duck call. The chase on water resumes by the dogs in their repaired boat. The duckling suddenly stops, and just as the dogs are about to shoot, the duckling pulls out a STOP sign and points to the clock from the beginning which now has a sign showing "NO SHOOTING AFTER 5:00 PM". The bell rings, much to the dogs's horror, but as they both scream in terror, the ducks come back, swimming, flying and doing another conga line, while the disgruntled the dogs sit angry that they didn't even shoot one single duck. Meanwhile, on the boat, the duckling has now joined the conga line as the camera irises out on him in timing.

== Voice Cast ==
- Tex Avery as Large Dog Sneezing

== Credits ==
- Director: Tex Avery
- Story: Rich Hogan
- Animation: Walter Clinton, Preston Blair, Louie Schmitt, Grant Simmons
- Music: Scott Bradley
