= Henpecked Hoboes =

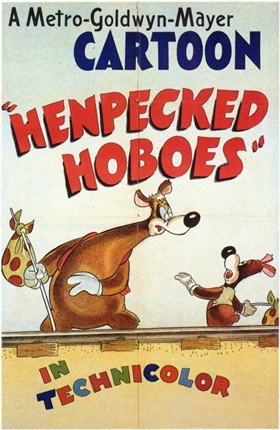
- Original poster
- Directed by: Tex Avery
- Story by: Heck Allen
- Produced by: Fred Quimby
- Music by: Scott Bradley
- Animation by: Ed Love; Walter Clinton; Preston Blair; Ray Abrams
- Color process: Technicolor
- Production company: Metro-Goldwyn-Mayer cartoon studio
- Distributed by: Metro-Goldwyn-Mayer
- Release date: October 26, 1946
- Running time: 8 minutes
- Country: United States
- Language: English

Henpecked Hoboes is a theatrical cartoon short released on October 26, 1946 directed by Tex Avery. It stars George and Junior in their first appearance. According to model sheets, the cartoon's working title was Bums Away.

== Plot ==
George and Junior are hobos who want a chicken dinner. George's plans for catching a hen are constantly sabotaged by Junior's detrimental assistance. The duo take on more than they can chew as they attempt to get their hands on an alluring hen. George dons a rooster suit to lure away the hen from her guardian rooster, who is sent rocketing to the North Pole.

While the rooster walks back to civilization, George and Junior wreak havoc upon each other. They dress up as a worm (that is eaten by the hen) and a giant chick who is mothered to near-death. All in an attempt to get the alluring female onto the dinner table. At the end George, after one too many screwups, kicks Junior in the rear hard into the air. The hen then delivers a hard kick of her own to George, sending him flying.

Satisfied, the hen wipes her hands. She then feels a hand tap on her shoulder, and turns around. She is shocked to find that the rooster has returned. He is not happy about his trek back home, and motions for her to bend over. He gets his revenge by delivering countless kicks to the hen's backside, all the way back to the barn.

== Voice Cast ==
- Dick Nelson as George / Blackface Rochester voice
- Tex Avery as Junior
