= Bad Luck Blackie =

- The bulldog, about to get even more bad luck
- Directed by: Tex Avery
- Story by: Rich Hogan
- Produced by: Fred Quimby
- Starring: Patrick McGeehan; Tex Avery (both uncredited)
- Music by: Scott Bradley
- Animation by: Grant Simmons; Walter Clinton; Preston Blair; Louie Schmitt
- Color process: Technicolor; Perspecta (reissue)
- Production company: MGM Cartoons
- Distributed by: Metro-Goldwyn-Mayer
- Release date: January 22, 1949
- Running time: 7:06
- Language: English

Bad Luck Blackie is a 1949 American animated comedy short film produced by Metro-Goldwyn-Mayer.

The Tex Avery-directed short was voted the 15th-best cartoon of all-time in a 1994 poll of 1,000 animation industry professionals, as referenced in the book The 50 Greatest Cartoons.

The title is a play on Boston Blackie, a popular radio show at the time. The cartoon marks the first appearance of Tex Avery's version of Spike the Bulldog (later renamed as Butch the Irish Dog in 1957's Grin and Share It), who would later appear in Droopy cartoons in the late-1940s into the 1950s.

== Synopsis ==
As the story begins, a small, light-gray kitten with dark-gray markings is being mercilessly tormented by a large, mean bulldog. The kitten manages to escape, and while hiding for safety behind a garbage can, he is met by a bowler hat-wearing, cigar-chomping black cat, who offers to protect the kitten (his business card reads "Black Cat — Bad Luck Company — Paths Crossed–Guaranteed Bad Luck"). The black cat demonstrates his skills by crossing the path of the rapidly approaching bulldog (to the tune of "Comin' Through the Rye"), who is then knocked out by a flowerpot that falls from the sky. The black cat leaves the scene after giving the kitten a whistle, to be blown in case of emergency.

The bulldog revives, and tries multiple times to attack the kitten, but every attempt is foiled in the same way: the kitten blows the whistle, the black cat crosses the bulldog's path regardless of circumstances, and the dog is pummeled by various objects falling from the sky, including a cash register, a piano, and a set of good luck horseshoes (not to mention the horse they belong to). At one point, the bulldog seizes the kitten before the kitten can blow his whistle. Though the kitten manages to hold on to the whistle with his paw, the bulldog covers the kitten's mouth with his own paw to silence him. Then a fly lands on the bulldog's nose and causes him irritation. When the bulldog can no longer bear it, he swats the fly with the paw he has been using to silence the kitten. The kitten then blows the whistle yet again, the black cat crosses the bulldog's path, and the bulldog is knocked out cold by another falling object, an object whose presence dogs normally welcome - a fire hydrant.

Eventually, the bulldog frightens the kitten into giving up the whistle, and (after a couple of false starts) he gains the upper hand on the black cat in a construction site by luring him under a large paintbrush, turning him white and rendering his bad luck powers useless. The bulldog then seizes the now-white cat and tauntingly blows the whistle in his face. However, the kitten saves the day by painting himself black and crossing the bulldog's path. The bulldog is conked by a falling anvil just as he is about to beat up the formerly-black cat, and he instead puts the cat down gently on the ground. The bulldog then falls to the ground on his back and ends up swallowing the whistle by accident, triggering a case of the hiccups, each one of which causes the whistle to go off. As a result, all manner of huge objects plummet from the sky (ranging from a kitchen sink all the way to a battleship), causing the bulldog to flee in terror. The formerly-black cat gives the kitten his bowler hat as a sign of gratitude for saving his life. The kitten faces the viewer (to the tune of "Auld Lang Syne," which is a melodic variant of "Comin' Through the Rye") with a huge grin, and then he snickers in delight when he realizes his new purpose in life as a bad luck cat. The cartoon ends with the kitten offering a goofy smile with his tongue visible.

== Reception ==
The Film Daily (April 8, 1949): "Jet black Blackie brought bad luck to everyone who crossed his path until he met his match in large fanged bull-dog. Blackie turns white and not with age, as they work things out. This cartoon has lots of action and laughs."

Boxoffice (Feb 5, 1949): "Very Good. Blackie, a jet black cat, befriends a white kitten being tormented by a bulldog. Every time the dog crosses Blackie's path, practically everything falls on him out of the sky, from bricks to pianos. When the dog finally removes the spell on him by painting Blackie white, the kitten goes in for black paint, and assorted articles as large as airplanes rain down on the dog. Well drawn and really funny."

== Credits ==
- Director: Tex Avery
- Story: Rich Hogan
- Animation: Grant Simmons, Walter Clinton, Preston Blair, Louie Schmitt
- Music: Scott Bradley

== Voice cast ==
- Patrick McGeehan as Blackie the Cat
- Tex Avery as Spike (laughs and vocal noises) / Blackie (panting) / the kitten, whom Blackie calls "Shorty" (vocal noises and laugh at the end).

== Availability ==
VHS

- Tex Avery's Screwball Classics

Laserdisc

- Tex Avery's Screwball Classics
- The Compleat Tex Avery

DVD

- Kitty Foyle

Blu-ray

- Looney Tunes Platinum Collection: Volume 2
- Tex Avery Screwball Classics: Volume 1 (restored)

Streaming

- Boomerang App
- Max
- Tubi

== In popular culture ==
- In the first couple of minutes of the cartoon, the bulldog presses the kitten between two books in a bookcase where the kitten has been hiding. The bulldogs then pulls the kitten, now in the shape of a book, off the bookcase shelf and the kitten-cum-book bears the title "KITTY FOILED" on the cover. This is a pun on the title of a 1939 novel, Kitty Foyle, which in 1940 was made into a movie starring Ginger Rogers in the title role.
- Several clips from Bad Luck Blackie were used by the rockabilly band The Stray Cats in the music video for their 1983 hit "Stray Cat Strut".
- Marv Wolfman based the Marvel Comics character Felicia Hardy / Black Cat on Bad Luck Blackie. The character debuted in The Amazing Spider-Man #194 in July 1979.
