= Ventriloquist Cat =

1950 cartoon by Tex Avery

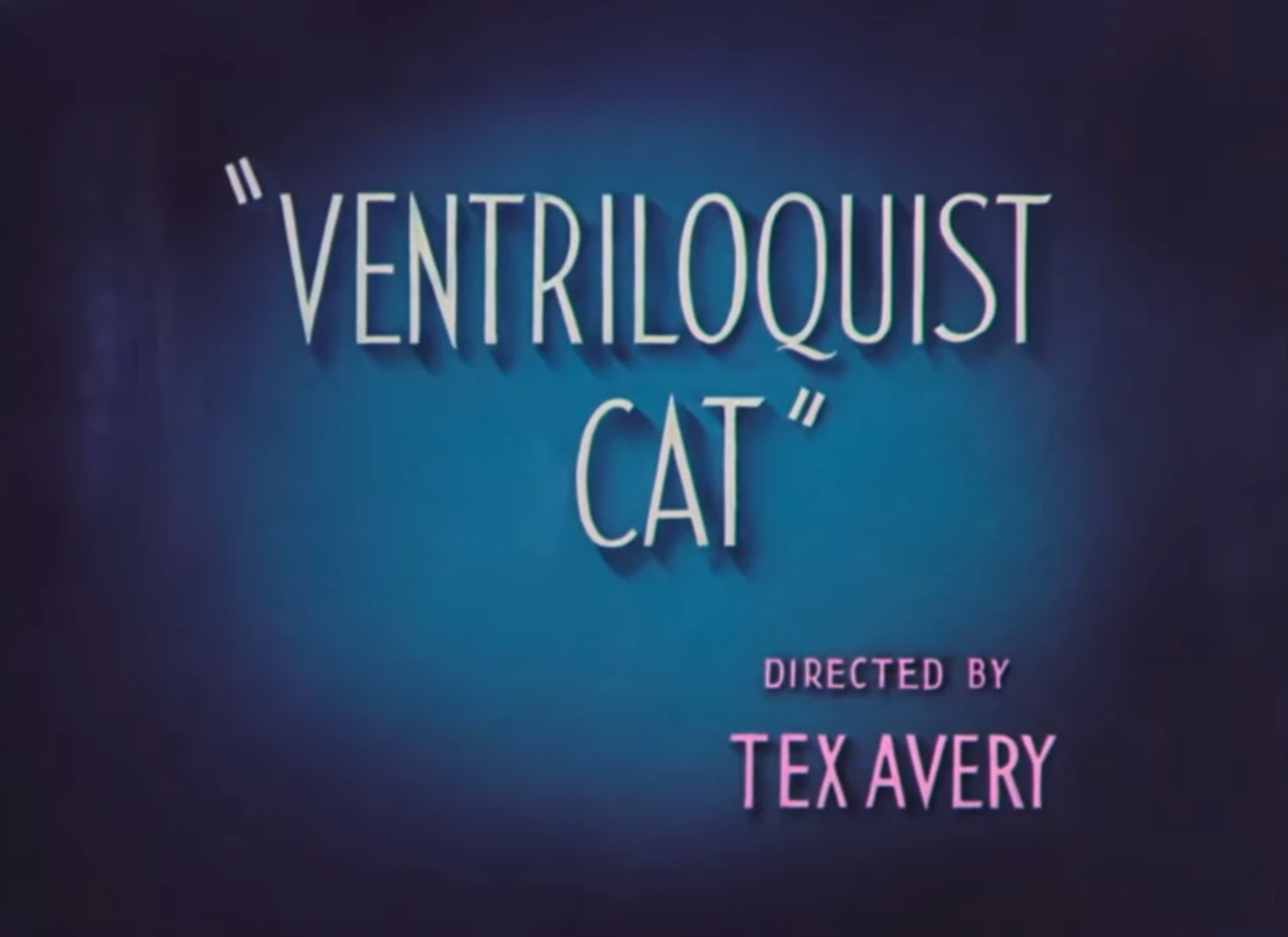
- Title card
- Directed by: Tex Avery
- Story by: Rich Hogan
- Produced by: Fred Quimby
- Starring: Tex Avery; Red Coffey
- Music by: Scott Bradley
- Animation by: Walter Clinton; Michael Lah; Grant Simmons
- Backgrounds by: Don Driscoll
- Production company: MGM Cartoons
- Distributed by: Metro-Goldwyn-Mayer; Loew's Incorporated
- Release date: May 27, 1950
- Running time: 6:39
- Language: English

Ventriloquist Cat is a 1950 animated short film directed by Tex Avery and produced by Fred Quimby for MGM Cartoons. The film was released in the US with the movie The Big Hangover on May 27, 1950, by Metro-Goldwyn-Mayer. The short stars Spike and Blackie the Cat.

== Plot ==
Blackie the Cat is being chased by Spike after he is caught writing "I hate Dogs!" on the fence. In order to escape, Blackie inadvertently jumps into a box full of assorted tricks and discovers a ventriloquist's device for throwing his voice. With his newly acquired powers of ventriloquism, Blackie plays a series of practical jokes on the bulldog. Ultimately, the jokes backfire on Blackie after he discards the device.

== Voice cast ==
- Red Coffey and Tex Avery as Blackie the Cat
- Tex Avery as Spike (vocal noises)

== Remake as Cat's Meow ==
Cat's Meow
- Theatrical release poster
- Directed by: Tex Avery
- Story by: Rich Hogan
- Produced by: William Hanna; Joseph Barbera
- Starring: Tex Avery; Red Coffey
- Music by: Scott Bradley
- Animation by: Walter Clinton; Michael Lah; Grant Simmons
- Backgrounds by: Don Driscoll
- Production company: MGM Cartoons
- Distributed by: Metro-Goldwyn-Mayer; Loew's Incorporated
- Release date: January 25, 1957
- Running time: 6:39
- Language: English

Ventriloquist Cat was later remade in CinemaScope as Cat's Meow, which was released on January 25, 1957. It was one of two Avery MGM cartoons to have been reworked in the widescreen format (the other was the 1949 Droopy cartoon Wags to Riches, which was redone as Millionaire Droopy); as Avery himself was long gone from MGM at the time of these remakes, the new versions were worked on by the Hanna-Barbera unit, despite having Avery's name credited on the title card.
