= Cellbound =

- Directed by: Tex Avery; Michael Lah
- Story by: Heck Allen
- Produced by: Fred Quimby
- Starring: Paul Frees; William Hanna (both uncredited)
- Music by: Scott Bradley
- Animation by: Kenneth Muse; Ed Barge; Irvin Spence; Michael Lah
- Layouts by: Ed Benedict (uncredited)
- Backgrounds by: Vera Ohman
- Production company: MGM Cartoons
- Distributed by: Metro-Goldwyn-Mayer
- Release date: November 25, 1955
- Running time: 6:25
- Language: English

Cellbound is a 1955 MGM Cartoon featuring Butch and directed by Tex Avery and Michael Lah. The story was by Heck Allen, and Paul Frees voiced all the characters. Its title is a pun on "spellbound".

This was the last cartoon directed by Tex Avery for MGM, before he left to return to Walter Lantz Productions in 1953, where his career in animation began. Due to his animation unit being disbanded by MGM that same year, Avery and co-director Michael Lah had to utilize the Hanna-Barbera unit for its animation, alongside the 1955 Droopy cartoon Deputy Droopy. The same year that Cellbound was released, Avery began his career in television at Cascade Studios, which Lah introduced him to, working on commercials for Raid and Kool-Aid (advertisements for the latter featured Bugs Bunny, who Cascade was unaware Avery had created). In 1978, the studio shut down, and Avery began working at Hanna-Barbera a year later; it would be his final job before his death.

It was also the last 1950s MGM cartoon that was not filmed in CinemaScope. This cartoon and Good Will to Men were the last two to be produced by Fred Quimby before his retirement.

== Plot ==
Butch plays a prisoner doing 500 years at Sing Song Prison. He attempts to escape by digging a tunnel under his cell floor using a teaspoon, only temporarily stopping whenever a guard or the warden walks by. 20 years (and 6,500,004,385,632 teaspoons) later, Butch finally digs up through the outside of the prison wall, after he exclaimed: "Daylight! Freedom after 20 years!". He returns to his cell to get his disguises, but stops all escape activity when the warden comes walking by again. When Butch mentions to the warden it is his 20th anniversary in prison, the warden suddenly remembers it is his wedding anniversary and runs out to get his wife a gift. Butch takes his disguises, escapes through the tunnel, and enters a train boxcar, where he guts out a television set to hide in it. Unbeknownst to Butch, the TV is not only destined for Sing Song Prison; it is in fact the warden's gift for his wife.

The warden, unaware the TV is non-functional and Butch is inside, proceeds to check the channels using TV listings from the newspaper, and Butch realizes he must play out everything the warden wants to watch, using his disguises and careful positioning on the TV screen to do it. After acting out a Western film, Butch simulates a boxing match by punching himself and playing the referee. When the warden tries to watch horse racing, Butch, who does not have equestrian disguises, uses a watering can to simulate rain and a card that claims the races were called off due to weather. The warden decides on a musical program instead, with Butch playing a "one-man band" that he greatly enjoys and even dances to. After this, the warden turns the TV off, satisfied that his wife will enjoy it. An exhausted Butch breaks through the bottom of the TV set and starts digging through the ground just as the warden picks the TV up and heads home with it.

After tunneling away, Butch reaches the end of his path, only to end up back inside the same TV set, now in the warden's living room. The warden proceeds to show his wife how well it works, but when he "turns it on", Butch pops up, prompting the warden to say to his wife, "I saw him today, you'll like this guy; he's crazy." Realizing that he must do the same routines again, Butch screams and goes into a mental breakdown.

== Voice cast ==
- Paul Frees as Butch / The Warden / The Warden's Wife / Two Prisoners saying "Good Morning, Warden" (offscreen)
  - Gus Bivona plays Butch's harmonica solo at the beginning
