= Bill Thompson (voice actor) =

American radio personality and actor (1913–1971)

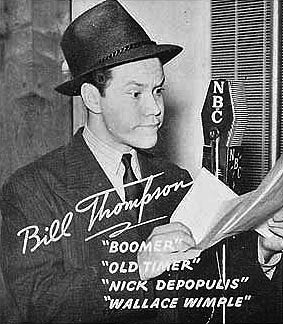
- Thompson circa 1939
- Born: July 8, 1913; Terre Haute, Indiana, U.S.
- Died: July 15, 1971 (aged 58); Culver City, California, U.S.
- Occupations: Radio personality, voice actor
- Years active: 1934–1971
- Known for: Voice of Droopy in the Metro-Goldwyn-Mayer cartoon department (1943–1945, 1949–1958); Voice of White Rabbit and Capt. Dodo in Alice in Wonderland (1951); Voice of Mr. Smee in Peter Pan (1953); Voice of Jock in Lady and the Tramp (1955); Voice of King Hubert in Sleeping Beauty (1959); Voice of Uncle Waldo in The Aristocats (1970)
- Spouse: Mary Elizabeth McBride (m. 1950; div. 1952)

William H. Thompson (July 8, 1913 – July 15, 1971) was an American radio personality and voice actor, whose career stretched from the 1930s until his death. He was a featured comedian playing multiple roles on the Fibber McGee and Molly radio series, and was the voice of Droopy in most of the Metro-Goldwyn-Mayer cartoon department theatrical cartoons from 1943 to 1958.

== Early life and career ==
Thompson was born to vaudevillian parents and was of Scottish ancestry. He began his career in Chicago radio, where his early appearances included as a regular on Don McNeill's morning variety series The Breakfast Club in 1934 and a stint as a choir member on the musical variety series The Sinclair Weiner Minstrels around 1937. While on the former series, Thompson originated a meek, mush-mouthed character occasionally referred to in publicity as Mr. Wimple.

Thompson soon achieved his greatest fame after he joined the cast of the radio comedy Fibber McGee and Molly around 1936. On Fibber McGee and Molly, Thompson brought back the Wimple voice in 1941, and essayed a variety of roles, including a boisterous con man with a W. C. Fields voice, originally named Widdicomb Blotto but soon rechristened Horatio K. Boomer; and Nick Depopulis, the Greek restaurant owner. His two most famous roles on the series, however, were as The Old Timer and Wallace Wimple. The Old Timer, introduced in 1937, was a garrulous old gent who dropped in and listened to McGee's rambling stories and jokes. He inexplicably referred to McGee as "Johnny", as in: "That's pretty good, Johnny, but that ain't the way I heerd it!" This soon became a national catchphrase and surfaced in Warner Bros. Cartoons, notably Tortoise Wins by a Hare in which Bugs Bunny disguises himself as a bearded old man and tries to trick Cecil Turtle into telling him "how he beat that wabbit!").

== Wallace Wimple ==
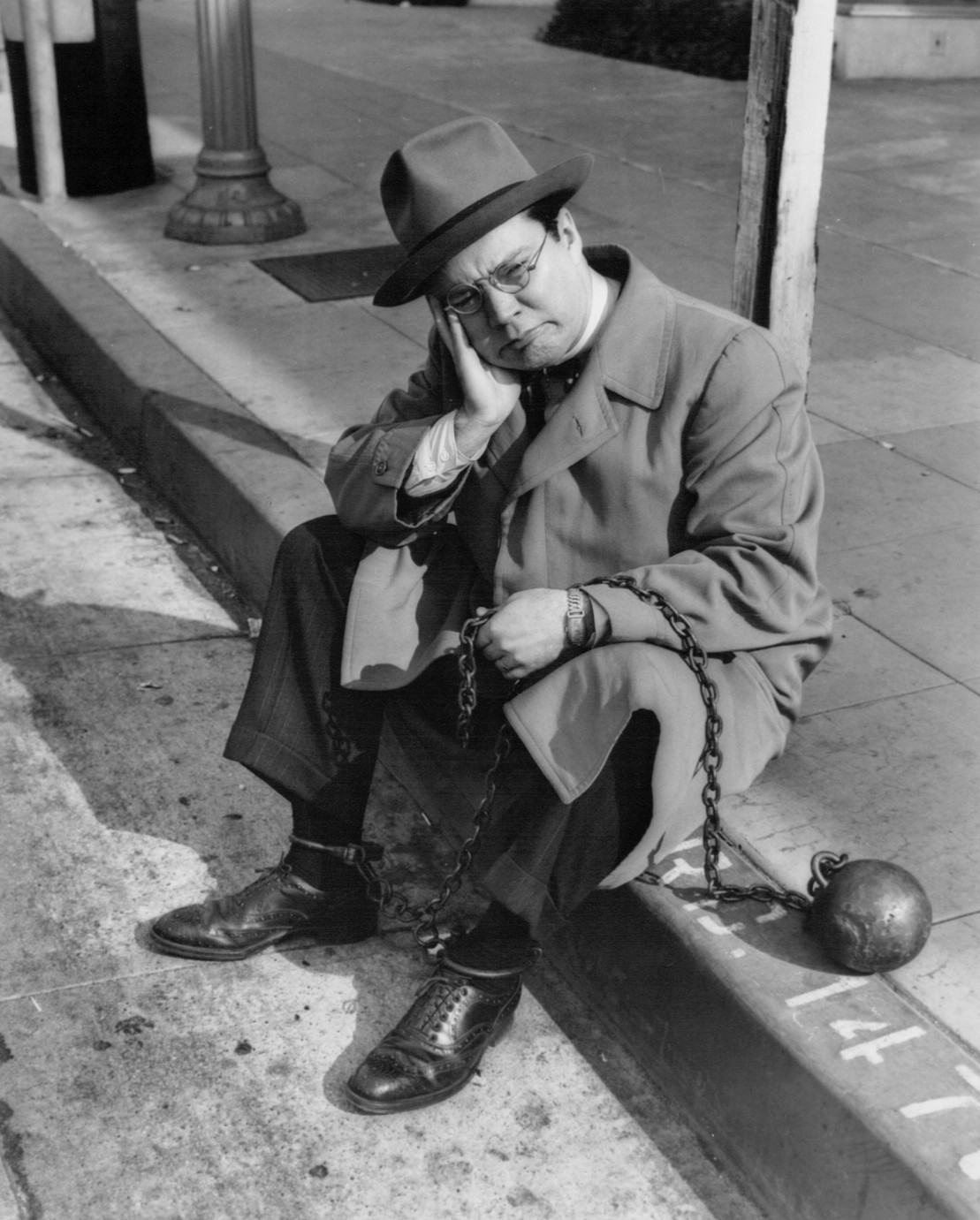
Thompson posing as Wallace Wimple

Wallace Wimple, an expansion of Thompson's Breakfast Club role, was his most enduring character. Wimple was a timid birdwatcher, appropriately nicknamed "Wimp" by McGee, who lived in constant terror of his "big old wife", nicknamed "Sweetie Face", who was often mentioned, but never heard. (The term "wimp" for an unmanly character was in common usage already, as with the cartoon character J. Wellington Wimpy). The character, whose greeting was a mild "Hello, folks", became very popular, and inspired animation director Tex Avery to build a dog character around the voice. This character, eventually named Droopy, was also voiced by Thompson in most of his appearances. Thompson also played the title role, an Adolf Hitler take-off, in Avery's Academy Award-nominated short Blitz Wolf.

== World War II ==
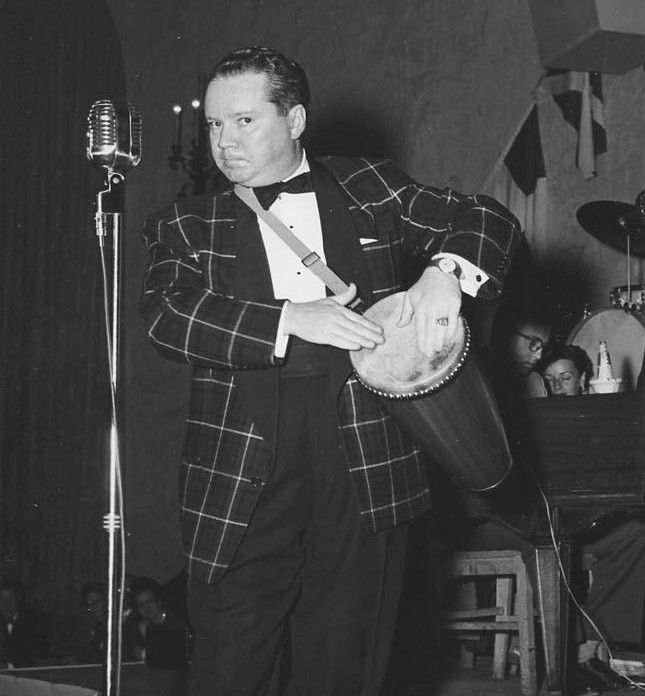
Thompson entertaining at a US Navy benefit in 1953

Around 1943, however, Thompson's thriving career was interrupted when he joined the US Navy during World War II, and all of his radio characters were temporarily dropped. He returned to Fibber McGee full-time in 1946, however, and also became a semi-regular on Edgar Bergen's radio series as lecturer "Professor" Thompson.

Thompson continued to work in radio until the late 1950s, notably in several episodes of CBS Radio Workshop, and his animation voice-over career also began to build during the 1950s. At the Metro-Goldwyn-Mayer cartoon department, he returned as Droopy and also played Droopy's recurring bulldog nemesis Spike (later known as Butch) after Avery's departure from MGM. Over the years he played many other characters in the studio's cartoon shorts (he used the Wimple/Droopy voice for the titular Native American caricature in 1944's Big Heel-Watha and for Tom's lookalike cousin George in 1957's Tom and Jerry entry Timid Tabby, for two examples).

== Walt Disney Studios ==
For Walt Disney Studios, Bill Thompson was heard in many shorts and features, often in either dialect parts or a variation of his Wimple/Droopy voice. His animated feature film credits included the parts of the White Rabbit and the Dodo in Alice in Wonderland, Mr. Smee and some of the other pirates in Peter Pan (reprising his roles in radio adaptations for Lux Radio Theater), and King Hubert in Sleeping Beauty. Many of the characters he played in Disney productions are now voiced by Corey Burton and Jeff Bennett.

His best showcase may well have been in Lady and the Tramp (1955), where he was heard in no fewer than five dialect parts: Jock the Scottish Terrier, Bull the cockney bulldog, Dachsie the German dachshund, Joe the Italian cook, and the Irish policeman in the zoo. In Disney's short subjects, he was heard as Ranger J. Audubon Woodlore in several Donald Duck and Humphrey the Bear entries and as Professor Owl in two music-related shorts, Melody and Toot Whistle Plunk and Boom, among many others; he reprised both of these roles in Disney's various television series. He also voiced Irish station manager Flannery in Pigs Is Pigs, and was the first actor to voice the comic-book character Scrooge McDuck (the theatrical featurette Scrooge McDuck and Money).

== Later career ==
In 1957, Thompson joined the Los Angeles branch of Union Oil as an executive, working in community relations and occasionally reprising his radio characters. During this period, around 1958, Thompson appeared as a guest challenger on the TV panel show To Tell the Truth.

Thompson remained sporadically active in animation, and went on to voice King Hubert in Disney's Sleeping Beauty and (using the Wallace Wimple voice) Touché Turtle for Hanna-Barbera's Touché Turtle and Dum Dum TV cartoons. Also, Thompson was originally cast as Fred Flintstone in The Flintstones, but William Hanna and Joseph Barbera decided to recast the role and Alan Reed redubbed Fred's voice in the episodes Thompson had already recorded (Thompson can still be heard in some bit roles in the early episodes).

== Personal life ==
On February 21, 1950, Bill Thompson married the daughter of cartoonist Clifford McBride, Mary Elizabeth McBride (not the radio personality Mary Margaret McBride). The couple divorced in January 1952.

Thompson received a star on the Hollywood Walk of Fame for his work in radio, on February 8, 1960.

== Death ==
Thompson's final assignment was the voice of Uncle Waldo in The Aristocats, which was released less than a year before his sudden death from septic shock on July 15, 1971, just a week after his 58th birthday.

== Selected filmography ==
- 1936: Custer's Last Stand – Renegade (uncredited)
- 1939: $1,000 a Touchdown – Animal And Bird Impersonator (uncredited)
- 1940: Comin' Round the Mountain – Barney Smoot
- 1941: Look Who's Laughing – Veteran (uncredited)
- 1942: Here We Go Again – Wallace Wimple
- 1951: Alice in Wonderland – White Rabbit / Dodo (voices)
- 1953: Peter Pan – Mr. Smee / Pirates (voices)
- 1953: Ben and Me – Governor Keith / Human Tour Guide / Miscellaneous Men (voices)
- 1955: Lady and the Tramp (1955) – Jock / Bull / Policeman at Zoo / Dachsie / Joe / Jim's Friend #1 (voices)
- 1959: Sleeping Beauty – King Hubert (voice)
- 1960: The Flintstones "The Engagement Ring" – Mister Slate (voice)
- 1960: Nature's Better Built Homes – J. Audubon Woodlore (voice)
- 1962-1963: The Hanna-Barbera New Cartoon Series – Touché Turtle (voice)
- 1967: Scrooge McDuck and Money – Scrooge McDuck (voice)
- 1957-1969: The Magical World of Disney – Ranger J. Audubon Woodlore / Oldtimer / Professor Owl / Ajax Employment Agency Proprietor (voices)
- 1969: Hell's Belles – L.G.
- 1970: The Aristocats – Uncle Waldo (voice; final film role)

== Sources ==
- Dunning, John. On the Air: The Encyclopedia of Old-Time Radio. New York: Oxford University Press, 1998. ISBN 0-19-507678-8
