= Tex Avery =

American animator (1908–1980)

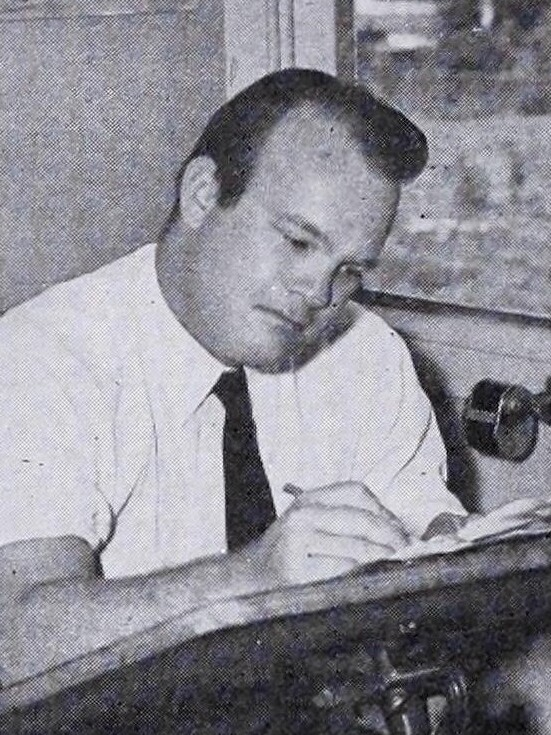
- Avery in 1941
- Born: Frederick Bean Avery; February 26, 1908; Taylor, Texas, U.S.
- Died: August 26, 1980 (aged 72); Burbank, California, U.S.
- Resting place: Forest Lawn Memorial Park, Hollywood Hills
- Other names: Fred Avery; Texas Avery
- Occupations: Animator; voice actor
- Years active: 1928–1980
- Employers: Winkler Pictures (1928–1929); Walter Lantz Productions (1929–1935; 1953–1955); Leon Schlesinger Productions (1935–1941); Paramount Pictures (1941); MGM (1942–1955); Cascade Studios (1955–1978); Hanna-Barbera (1978–1980)
- Spouse: Patricia Johnson (m. 1935; div. 1972)
- Children: 2

Frederick Bean "Tex" Avery (/ˈeɪvəri/; February 26, 1908 – August 26, 1980) was an American animator, film director and voice actor. He was known for directing and producing animated cartoons during the golden age of American animation. His most significant work was for Leon Schlesinger Productions and Metro-Goldwyn-Mayer's cartoon department, where he was crucial in the creation and evolution of famous animated characters such as Bugs Bunny, Daffy Duck, Porky Pig and Elmer Fudd for Warner Bros. and Droopy, Butch Dog, Screwy Squirrel, The Wolf, Red Hot Riding Hood, and George and Junior for Metro-Goldwyn-Mayer.

He gained influence for his technical innovation, directorial style, and brand of humor that appealed especially towards adults. Avery's attitude toward animation was opposite that of Walt Disney and other conventional family cartoons at the time. Avery's cartoons were known for their dark humor, sarcasm, irony, surreal, and sometimes sexual tone in nature. They focused on visual gags, meta humor, physically impossible gags, social satire, surrealist humor, rapid pacing, racial stereotypes, and violent slapstick occurring around brash, outlandish characters who broke the fourth wall, stating that cartoons are meant to do anything.

== Early life and education ==
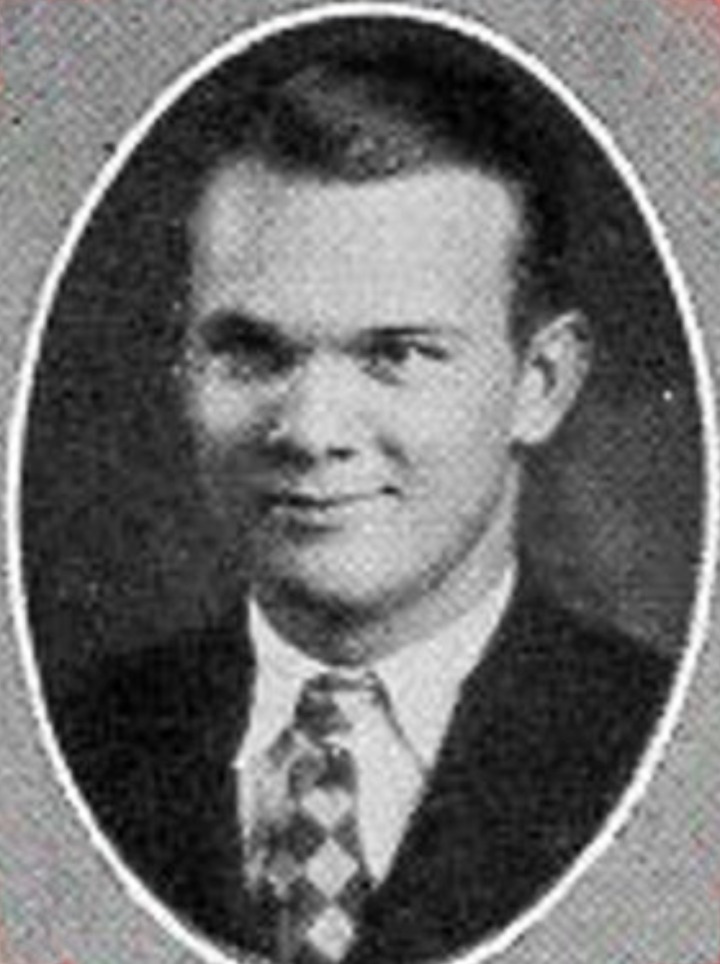
Avery's yearbook photo, North Dallas High School, 1926

Avery was born to Mary Augusta "Jessie" (née Bean; 1886–1931) and George Walton Avery (1867–1935) in Taylor, Texas, a suburb of Austin. His father was born in Alabama and his mother was born in Chickasaw County, Mississippi.

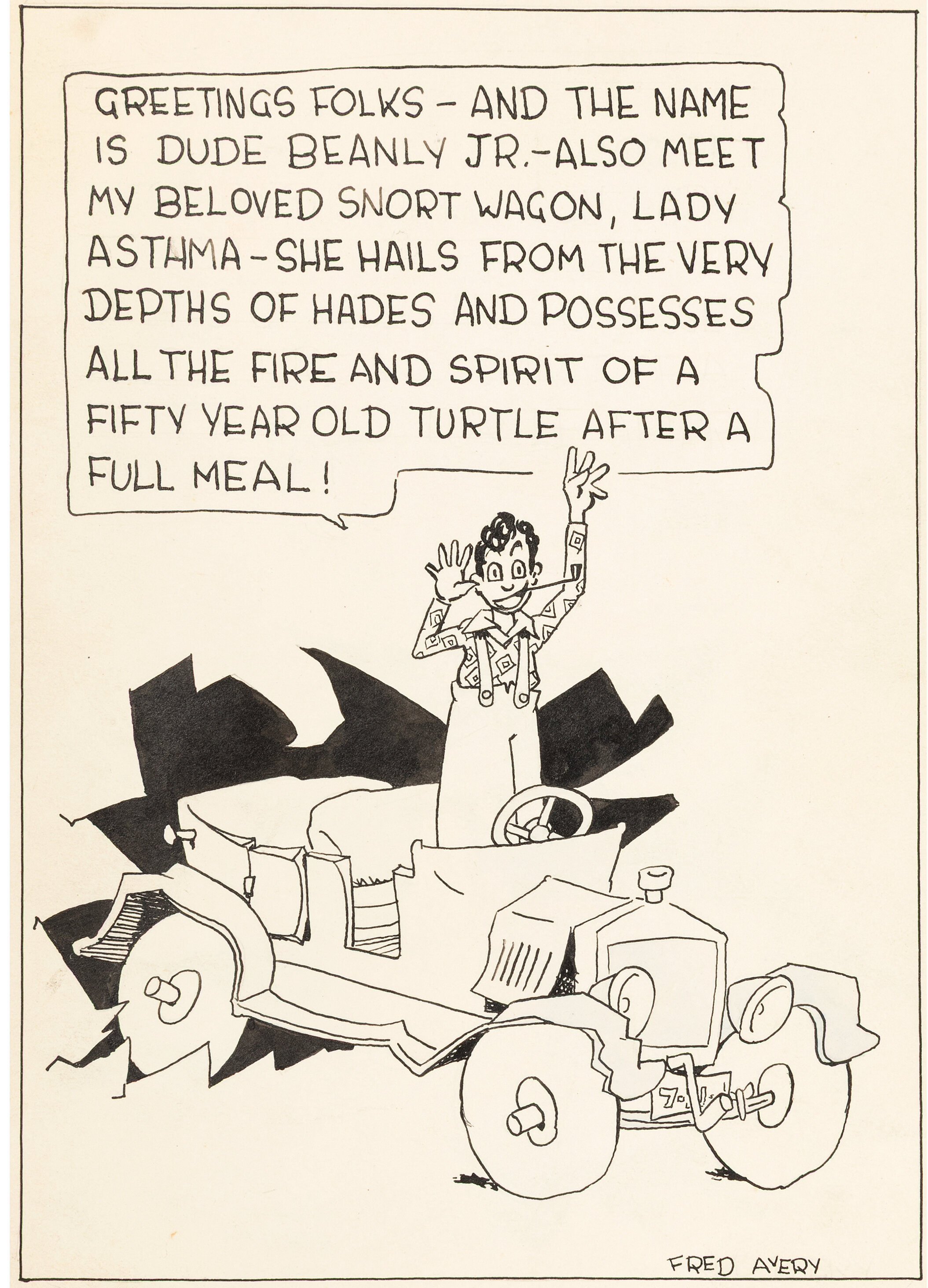
"Dude Beanly Jr.", a comic strip that Avery drew for the North Dallas High School monthly magazine

Avery graduated in 1926 from North Dallas High School. A popular catchphrase at his school was "What's up, doc?", which he later used for Bugs Bunny in the 1940s. Interested in becoming a newspaper cartoonist, he took a three-month summer course at the Art Institute of Chicago but left after a month.

Tex Avery's major inspirations were comedians such as Laurel & Hardy, Charlie Chaplin, Buster Keaton, Harold Lloyd and especially The Marx Brothers; the latter of which was inspiration for Bugs Bunny. He was especially inspired by Winsor McCay, Pat Sullivan, Otto Messmer, Max Fleischer and Walt Disney in terms of animation field. He additionally liked the works of newspaper comic strip artist Virgil Partch, mainly praising his surrealist gags.

== Animation career ==
On January 1, 1928, Avery arrived in Los Angeles. He spent the next few months working in menial jobs. According to animation historian Michael Barrier, these jobs included working in a warehouse, working on the docks at night, loading fruits and vegetables, and painting cars. He began his animation career when hired by Winkler Pictures as an inker, inking cels for animated short films in the Oswald the Lucky Rabbit series; he was one of numerous new hires, including director Walter Lantz, after creators Walt Disney and Ub Iwerks departed the company. After his co-workers, Hugh Harman and Rudolf Ising, proposed taking over the series to Universal Pictures executive Carl Laemmle, Laemmle instead assigned Lantz to operate an in-house animation studio; Avery followed Lantz to the new studio. He was again employed as an inker, but moved rapidly up the studio's hierarchy. By 1930, Avery had been promoted to the position of animator.

Avery continued working at Universal into the early 1930s. He worked on most of the Oswald the Lucky Rabbit cartoons from 1931 to 1935 and is credited as an animator. He later claimed to have directed two cartoons during this time.

=== Accident to eye ===
During some office horseplay at Universal, a thumbtack or paper clip flew into Avery's left eye and caused him to lose sight in that eye. Some speculate it was his lack of depth perception that gave him his unique look at animation and bizarre directorial style, but it did not stop his creative career. The incident is described in some detail by Barrier, based in part on old interviews with Avery. Part of the typical crude horseplay at the Universal studio was using a rubber band or a paper spitball to target the back of a colleague's head. An animator called Charles Hastings decided to take the game one step further, by using a wire paper clip, instead. Avery heard one of his colleagues telling him to look out. He reacted by turning around. Instead of the back of his head, the paper clip hit Avery in his left eye. He instantly lost the use of his eye. Avery subsequently had surgery to have the damaged eye removed and replaced with a realistic glass prosthetic.

=== From inker to storyboards ===
As an animator, Avery worked under director Bill Nolan. Nolan reportedly delegated work to Avery, whenever Avery had to animate a sequence. Nolan's instructions for a scene involving Oswald being chased by bees were reportedly simple. He would describe in which direction Oswald was running ("right to left") and for how many feet. The rest of the details were left up to Avery. Avery started handing out work to other animators working under Nolan.

Avery wanted still greater control over the creative process and served as a de facto director for a couple of films. Based on Avery's recollections, here is a description of how this happened. He was submitting sight gags for use in the short films. Some of them were used in the actual films, and some funny ones were left out. He wanted to somehow get all his gags in the finished film. So, he asked Nolan to let him create the entire storyboard for a film. Nolan instructed Avery to not only draw the storyboard, but also to work on the timing and the layout on his own. Avery completed two films using this process. An older Avery recalled that both films "were terrible", though they got accepted for release.

Avery was reportedly displeased with his salary and had started giving up on his work. After about six weeks of substandard work, Avery left with Virgil Ross, Sid Sutherland and Cecil Surry, angering Lantz.

=== "Termite Terrace" ===
Later in 1935, Avery applied for a job at Leon Schlesinger Productions. Avery reportedly managed to convince producer Leon Schlesinger that he was an experienced director, a false claim. In Avery's own words:

'Hey, I'm, a director.' Hell! I was no more a director than nothing, but with my loud mouth, I talked him into it.

By 1935, when Avery was hired, the Schlesinger studio had only two full-time, regular film directors: Friz Freleng and Jack King. Avery became the third regular director. The staff of the Schlesinger studio had become too large to be housed in a single building at the Warner Bros. backlot on Sunset Boulevard. The new Avery unit of the studio was granted their own building, a five-room bungalow. The unit staff dubbed their quarters "Termite Terrace", due to its significant termite population. "Termite Terrace" later became the nickname for the entire Schlesinger/Warner Bros. studio, primarily because Avery and his unit were the ones who defined what became known as "the Warner Bros. cartoon".

Avery was granted exclusive use of four animators: Bob Clampett, Chuck Jones, Sid Sutherland, and Virgil Ross. The first cartoon produced by this unit was Gold Diggers of '49 (1935), the third Looney Tunes film starring Beans. The film had a Western setting and cast Beans as a gold miner; it featured a great amount of tongue-in-cheek humor not found in most prior Looney Tunes shorts. Also featured in the film was a redesigned Porky Pig, making his second appearance. The Avery unit was assigned to work primarily on the black-and-white Looney Tunes instead of the Technicolor Merrie Melodies, but was allowed to make color Merrie Melodies beginning with Miss Glory from 1936. Avery was also noted to be the first to stray away from using song breaks in color cartoons starting with the 1937 short Uncle Tom's Bungalow, later saying that "We were forced to use a song, which would just ruin the cartoon. You'd try like a fool to get funny, but it was seldom you did."

The Haunted Mouse (1941)

Avery stopped using Beans following Gold Diggers of '49, but continued using Porky as a star character. According to Michael Barrier, Beans was more of a straight man. However, Porky had to be redesigned again. The early Porky was decidedly "piglike" in appearance. In Michael Barrier's description, Porky was very fat, had small eyes, a large snout, and pronounced jowls. He was like a porcine version of Roscoe Arbuckle. Starting with Porky the Rain-Maker (1936), his fourth animated short starring Porky, Avery introduced a cuter version of Porky. The new design gave Porky more prominent eyes and a smaller snout. The jowls were replaced by chubby cheeks. Porky's body now had a rounder shape; its defining trait was not fatness, but softness. Barrier notes that the new design by Avery departed from the "Disneyish" realism in the previous drawing style. Porky became a less realistic pig and looked more like a cartoon character.

Avery c. 1930s-1940s

According to Martha Sigall, Avery was one of the few directors to visit the ink and paint department — where he would answer questions and was always in good humor — as he liked to see how his cartoons were developing. When some of the artists humorously criticized the wild action in his animated shorts, Avery would take time to explain his rationale. He recalled that under Schlesinger's leadership, the animators had a great deal of liberty, and were subject to very little censorship.

=== Creation of Looney Tunes stars ===
Avery, with the assistance of Clampett, Jones, and the new associate director Frank Tashlin, laid the foundation for a style of animation that rivaled Walt Disney Productions as the leader in animated short films, and created a group of cartoon characters that are still known today. Avery, in particular, was deeply involved. He crafted gags for the shorts, sometimes provided voices for them (including his trademark belly laugh), and held such control over the timing of the shorts that he would add or cut frames out of the final negative if he felt a gag's timing was not quite right.

Porky's Duck Hunt (1937) introduced the character of Daffy Duck, who possessed a new form of "lunacy" and zaniness that had not been seen before in animated cartoons. Daffy was an almost completely crazy "darn fool duck" who frequently bounced around the film frame in double-speed, screaming "Hoo-hoo!" in a high-pitched, sped-up voice provided by voice artist Mel Blanc, who, with this cartoon, also took over providing the voice of Porky Pig. Avery directed two more Daffy Duck cartoons: Daffy Duck & Egghead and Daffy Duck in Hollywood. Egghead was a character inspired by comedian Joe Penner and first appeared in Avery's Egghead Rides Again.

Little Red Walking Hood first introduced the early character of Elmer Fudd as a character mostly taking part of some running gag. Elmer in this early form had green clothes, a brown bowler hat, and a pink nose. He was also named "Elmer" on the lobby cards for The Isle of Pingo Pongo (1938), his second appearance, Cinderella Meets Fella (1938), his third appearance, and was fully called "Elmer Fudd" on screen in A Feud There Was (1938), also his fourth appearance. Elmer even appears on early merchandise and in the early Looney Tunes books in 1938 and 1939. He was later promoted as "Egghead's Brother" on the Vitaphone Release Sheet for Cinderella Meets Fella because Elmer was also voiced by Danny Webb in his Joe Penner voice that was also used for Egghead.

Ben Hardaway, Cal Dalton, and Chuck Jones directed a series of shorts that featured a Daffy Duck-like rabbit, nicknamed "Bugs," created by Hardaway. Like most directors, each put his own personal stamp on the characters, stories, and overall feel of a work; and each of these cartoons treated the rabbit differently. The next to try out the rabbit, known around Termite Terrace as "Bugs' bunny", was Avery. Since the recycling of storylines among the directors was commonplace, A Wild Hare was a double throwback. Avery had directed the short Porky's Duck Hunt featuring Porky Pig, which also introduced Daffy Duck.

Hardaway remade it as Porky's Hare Hunt, introducing the rabbit. So, Avery went back to the "hunter and prey" framework, incorporating Jones's Elmer's Candid Camera gag for gag and altering the new design of Elmer Fudd, polishing the timing, and expanding the Groucho Marx smart-aleck attitude already present in Porky's Hare Hunt; he made Bugs Bunny a kind of slick Brooklynesque rabbit who was always in control of the situation. Avery has stated that it was very common to refer to folks in Texas as "doc", much like "pal", "dude", or "bud". In A Wild Hare, Bugs adopts this colloquialism when he casually walks up to Elmer, who is "hunting wabbits" and while carefully inspecting a rabbit hole, shotgun in hand, the first words out of Bugs' mouth is a coolly calm, "What's up, doc?" Audiences reacted riotously to the juxtaposition of Bugs' nonchalance and the potentially dangerous situation. "What's up, doc?" instantly became the rabbit's catchphrase. Originally, Avery wanted Bugs Bunny to be called Jack E. Rabbit because he hunted for jack rabbits when he was a kid. Numerous suggestions for names came up, but publicist Rose Horsely liked the name that was on Thorson's model sheet, saying that it was cute and they will "play it two ways." Avery argued on his stance for the name "Jack E. Rabbit" saying that "Mine's a rabbit! A tall, lanky, mean rabbit. He isn't a fuzzy little bunny." He also said the name Bugs Bunny sounded like a Disney character. Nevertheless, Schlesinger settled on Bugs Bunny.

Avery ended up directing only four Bugs Bunny cartoons: A Wild Hare, Tortoise Beats Hare, The Heckling Hare, and All This and Rabbit Stew. During this period, he also directed a number of one-shot shorts, including travelogue parody (The Isle of Pingo Pongo, which is the second cartoon to feature an early character that evolved into Elmer Fudd); fractured fairy-tales (The Bear's Tale); Hollywood caricature films (Hollywood Steps Out); and cartoons featuring Bugs Bunny clones (The Crackpot Quail).

Avery's tenure at the Schlesinger studio ended in late 1941 when the producer and he quarreled over the ending to The Heckling Hare. In Avery's original version, Bugs and the hunting dog were to fall off a cliff three times, making it an early example of the wild take. According to a DVD commentary for the cartoon, historian and animator Greg Ford explained that the problem Schlesinger had with the ending was that, just before falling off the third time, Bugs and the dog were to turn to the screen, with Bugs saying, "Hold on to your hats, folks, here we go again!", a punchline to a potentially risqué joke of the day. However, Barrier uncovered a typewritten dialogue transcript of the cartoon that mentions the three falls at the end, but the "Hold on to your hats" line is absent, with the rest of the dialogue in the cartoon transcribed accurately. This implied that Avery either misremembered or embellished the story and Schlesinger made the cut not because of any risqué content, but because he did not think that it was funny that Avery was killing Bugs three times, and the ending simply dragged on for too long. The Hollywood Reporter reported on the quarrel on July 2, 1941. Avery was slapped with a four-week, unpaid suspension.

=== Speaking of Animals ===
While at Schlesinger, Avery created a concept of animating lip movement to live-action footage of animals. Schlesinger was not interested in Avery's idea, so Avery approached Jerry Fairbanks, a friend of his who produced the Unusual Occupations series of short subjects for Paramount Pictures. Fairbanks liked the idea and the Speaking of Animals series of shorts was launched. When Avery left the Schlesinger studio in mid-1941, he went straight to Paramount to work on the first three shorts in the series before joining Metro-Goldwyn-Mayer (MGM). The series continued without him, lasting seven years.

=== Avery at MGM ===
Jerky Turkey (1945)

On September 2, 1941, the Reporter announced that Avery had signed a five-year contract with Metro-Goldwyn-Mayer, where he was to form his own animation unit and direct shorts in Technicolor. By 1942, Avery was in the employ of MGM, working in their cartoon division under the supervision of Fred Quimby and taking over Hugh Harman's unit. Avery felt that Schlesinger had stifled him. When asked if he missed the Looney Tunes characters, he responded: "Sometimes, but I don't miss anything else. MGM is a heck of a better place to work, in every way, and the people here are just as great."

At MGM, Avery's creativity reached its peak. His cartoons became known for their sheer lunacy, breakneck pace, and penchant for playing with the medium of animation and film in general that few other directors dared to approach. MGM also offered him larger budgets and a higher quality production level than the Warner Bros. studio; plus, his unit was filled with talented ex-Disney artists such as Preston Blair and Ed Love. These changes were evident in Avery's first short released by MGM, Blitz Wolf, an Adolf Hitler parody of the "Three Little Pigs" story, which was nominated for the Academy Award for Best Short Subject (Cartoons) in 1942.

Avery's best-known MGM character debuted in Dumb-Hounded (1943). Droopy (originally "Happy Hound") was a small, calm, slow-moving, and slow-talking dog who always won out in the end, whatever difficulties he faced. He also created a series of risqué cartoons, beginning with Red Hot Riding Hood (also 1943), featuring a sexy female star who never had a set name, but has been unofficially referred to as "Red" by fans. Her visual design and voice varied somewhat between shorts. Other Avery characters at MGM included Screwy Squirrel, Butch Dog and the Of Mice and Men-inspired duo of George and Junior.

Other MGM cartoons directed by Avery include Bad Luck Blackie, Cellbound, Magical Maestro, Lucky Ducky, Ventriloquist Cat, and King-Size Canary. Avery began his stint at MGM working with lush colors and realistic backgrounds, but he slowly abandoned this style for a more frenetic, less realistic approach. The newer, more stylized look reflected the influence of the up-and-coming UPA studio, the need to cut costs as budgets grew higher, and Avery's own desire to leave reality behind and make cartoons that were not tied to the real world of live action. During this period, he made a series of films that explored the technology of the future: The House of Tomorrow, The Car of Tomorrow, The Farm of Tomorrow, and T.V. of Tomorrow (spoofing common live-action promotional shorts of the time). He also introduced a slow-talking wolf character, who was the prototype for MGM associates Hanna-Barbera's Huckleberry Hound character, right down to the voice by Daws Butler.

Avery took a year's sabbatical from MGM beginning in 1950 (to recover from overwork), during which time Dick Lundy, recently arrived from the Walter Lantz studio, took over his unit and made one Droopy cartoon, as well as a string of shorts featuring Barney Bear. Avery returned to MGM in October 1951 and began working again. Avery's last two original cartoons for MGM were Deputy Droopy and Cellbound, completed in 1953 and released in 1955. They were co-directed by the Avery unit animator Michael Lah. Lah began directing a handful of CinemaScope Droopy shorts on his own. On March 1, 1953, Avery's unit was terminated and he was fired from MGM. Fred Quimby spoke of bringing back the unit, but in December of that year, Walter Lantz announced that Avery would be working for him.

=== Return to Walter Lantz Productions ===
Avery directed four cartoons for Walter Lantz Productions in 1954–55: Crazy Mixed Up Pup, Sh-h-h-h-h-h, I'm Cold, and The Legend of Rockabye Point, in which he defined the character of Chilly Willy the penguin. He brought his signature wild gags and fast pacing to the Lantz studio, and the Lantz cartoons received new energy and recognition. The Legend of Rockabye Point and Crazy Mixed Up Pup were nominated for Academy Awards.

Avery had agreed to a salary and a percentage of the profits. He did not realize that his share came out of the net profits: "I made about four cartoons for [Lantz], then I started thinking about the contract. I took it to an attorney, and he said, 'Oh, brother! You'll never get a dime out of this. You're getting charged for everything but the paving out in front of the studio.' I was getting my percentage off the bottom instead of off the top. By the time all the charges went in, why, my goodness, there was nothing left. So, I gave up there." Avery left behind three new Chilly Willy storyboards, which were later made into cartoons by director Alex Lovy.

=== Cascade Studios ===
Pepsodent commercial, c. 1950s

Avery turned to animated television commercials at Cascade Studios, including those for Raid (1950s through 1970s), in which cartoon insects, confronted by the bug killer, screamed "RAID!" and died flamboyantly, and Frito-Lay's controversial mascot, the Frito Bandito. Avery also produced ads for Kool-Aid fruit drinks starring Bugs Bunny and Elmer Fudd; executives at Cascade Studios were not informed about his involvement with the characters' creation. His earliest commercial work is advertisements for the toothpaste brand Pepsodent.

During the 1960s and 1970s, Avery became increasingly reserved and depressed due to the suicide of his son and the break-up of his marriage, although he continued to draw respect from his peers. After Cascade, he briefly animated commercials for his own company, Tex Avery Cartoons, from June to July 1973. In 1975, independent animator Steve Peck showed his unofficial Looney Tunes cartoon to Avery at the Fox Venice Theater in Los Angeles, titled Rabbit Habit. The short depicted Bugs Bunny, Daffy Duck, Elmer Fudd and Yosemite Sam as junkies and drug dealers in 1970s New York City. Avery loved the cartoon, telling Peck, "I wish I had a job to give you," while Chuck Jones disliked the cartoon due to its portrayal of the characters. Avery then went back to Cascade, and closed the cartoon department in 1978. He had an offer from Friz Freleng, to write for DePatie–Freleng Enterprises, but was not interested.

=== Hanna-Barbera Productions ===
From 1979 until his death, his final employer was Hanna-Barbera Productions, where he wrote gags for Saturday morning cartoons such as Fred and Barney Meet the Thing and the Droopy-esque Kwicky Koala. According to an interview by John Dunn in his diary, Avery did not like the late animation industry at the time, feeling that it lacked quality.

== Innovation ==
Gary Morris described Avery's innovative approach:

Above all, [Avery] steered the Warner Bros. house style away from Disney-esque sentimentality and made cartoons that appealed equally to adults, who appreciated Avery's speed, sarcasm, and irony, and to kids, who liked the nonstop action. Disney's "cute and cuddly" creatures, under Avery's guidance, were transformed into unflappable wits like Bugs Bunny, endearing buffoons like Porky Pig, or dazzling crazies like Daffy Duck. Even the classic fairy tale, a market that Disney had cornered, was appropriated by Avery, who made innocent heroines like Red Riding Hood into sexy jazz babes, more than a match for any Wolf. Avery also endeared himself to intellectuals by constantly breaking through the artifice of the cartoon, having characters leap out of the end credits, loudly object to the plot of the cartoon they were starring in, or speak directly to the audience.

As noted by Lambiek, Tex Avery's cartoons would often include realistic backgrounds but depart from reality or break the fourth wall by having the characters perform physically impossible gags or talk to the audience.

== Directing style ==
Avery had developed a directing style unlike anything moviegoers had ever seen, a distinct, signature style at Warner Bros. Studio, which had breakneck pacing, outlandish, over-the-top acting from his characters, and seemingly nonstop jokes and gags. Avery's style of directing encouraged animators to stretch the boundaries of the medium to do things in a cartoon that could not be done in the world of a live-action film. An often-quoted line about Avery's cartoons was, "In a cartoon, you can do anything." He also performed a great deal of voice work in his cartoons, usually throwaway bits. He also occasionally filled in for Bill Thompson as Droopy.

== Personal life and death ==
Two days after being fired from Universal in spring 1935, Avery married his girlfriend, Patricia Johnson. She was also employed at Universal as an inker. The newlyweds spent a long honeymoon in Oregon, but had to return to Los Angeles when they ran out of money.

On Tuesday, August 26, 1980, Avery died from gastroesophageal junction adenocarcinoma at St. Joseph's Hospital in Burbank, California, at the age of 72. At the time of his death, he was developing a character named "Cave Mouse" for a new Flintstones series. According to Chuck Jones, when watching a baseball game with another animator, Avery's last words were, "I don't know where animators go when they die, but I guess there must be a lot of them. They could probably use a good director, though." He is buried in Forest Lawn Memorial Park, Hollywood Hills.

== Influence and legacy ==
Although Tex Avery was no longer alive to experience the renaissance age of animation from the late-1980s to onwards, his own works were completely rediscovered, began to receive widespread attention, and were widely praised by the modern animation and modern film communities. His work also influenced modern cartoons and live action movies such as Who Framed Roger Rabbit, Tiny Toon Adventures, The Ren & Stimpy Show, the Genie from Aladdin, Animaniacs, Rocko's Modern Life, The Mask, SpongeBob SquarePants, Courage the Cowardly Dog, and Cat Burglar. An Avery-esque cowboy cartoon character bore Avery's name in the otherwise animated series The Wacky World of Tex Avery. Tex Avery's work has been featured on The Tex Avery Show and Cartoon Alley.

In the mid-1990s, Dark Horse Comics released a trio of three-issue miniseries that were openly labelled tributes to Avery's MGM cartoons, Wolf & Red, Droopy, and Screwy Squirrel, in which his characters make appearances in the comics such as those from George and Junior and Spike. Avery, unlike most Warner Bros. directors, kept many original title cards of his cartoons; several were otherwise lost due to Blue Ribbon Reissues. Rare prints and art containing original titles and unedited animation from Avery's MGM and Warner Bros. cartoons are now usually sold on eBay or in the collections of animators and cartoon enthusiasts. In 2008, France issued three postage stamps honoring Tex Avery for his 100th birthday, depicting Droopy, Red, and the Wolf.

All of his MGM shorts were released in a North American MGM/UA laserdisc set called The Compleat [sic] Tex Avery. While two cartoons in the set were edited (the blackface gags in Droopy's Good Deed and Garden Gopher), others, including the controversial Uncle Tom's Cabaña and Half-Pint Pygmy, were included intact; the latter were removed from the Region 2 DVD release, now out of print. Several of his cartoons were released on VHS, in four volumes of Tex Avery's Screwball Classics, two VHS Droopy collections, and various inclusions on MGM animation collection releases, with many gags left in that had been edited out for television.

Avery's Droopy cartoons are available on the DVD set Tex Avery's Droopy: The Complete Theatrical Collection. The seven Droopy cartoons produced in CinemaScope were included here in their original widescreen versions (letter-boxed), instead of the pan-and-scan versions regularly broadcast on television.

Also, some of his works could be found on home video releases (from VHS to Blu-ray) of Warner Bros.' Merrie Melodies and Looney Tunes shorts, and the same is true of his few Lantz Studio cartoons included in the DVD set The Woody Woodpecker and Friends Classic Cartoon Collection.

Just like with the Bob Clampett Humanitarian Award, first awarded to Forrest J Ackerman in 1984, and the Friz Freleng Lifetime Achievement of Excellence, first awarded to Freleng himself in 1994, the Texas Avery Award was first awarded to Brad Bird in 2005, 25 years after Avery's death. First presented by the Deep Ellum Film Festival, it is now presented by Reel FX. Notable recipients include Henry Selick, Pete Docter, Dean DeBlois and Chris Sanders for How to Train Your Dragon, John Kricfalusi for his contributions to the animation industry, and Phil Lord and Christopher Miller.

Avery is honored by Texas Historical Marker #17073, which was unveiled in his hometown of Taylor, Texas, in 2014. The marker says Avery spent "a lifetime...reinventing the American cartoon."

In February 2020, Warner Archive released Tex Avery Screwball Classics Volume 1 on Blu-ray containing 19 of his MGM cartoons. According to Jerry Beck, most of MGM's pre-1951 cartoons had their original negatives destroyed in the 1978 George Eastman House fire, causing great difficulties in terms of restoration. However, using the best surviving archival elements, all 19 shorts on the set have been digitally restored in HD and are uncut. In March 2020, Warner Archive announced they were working on Tex Avery Screwball Classics Volume 2, which was released in December 2020 and contained 21 restored and uncut shorts as well as Tex Avery: The King of Cartoons, an archival documentary as a special feature. Volume 3 was released on October 5, 2021, with an additional 20 uncut restored cartoons with the Avery directed Merrie Melodies short, The Crackpot Quail, as a bonus feature restored with its original 1941 soundtrack.

== Filmography ==
Many of Avery's cartoons have been released on home video over the years:

Release	Film	Media	Notes
1985	The Adventures Of Droopy	VHS	features 7 animated shorts
1988	Cartoon Moviestars: Tex Avery Screwball Classics	VHS	features 8 animated shorts
1989	Tex Avery Screwball Classics Vol. 2	VHS	features 8 animated shorts
1990	Here Comes Droopy	VHS	features 6 animated shorts
1991	Tex Avery Screwball Classics Vol. 3	VHS	features 6 animated shorts
1992	Tex Avery Screwball Classics Vol. 4	VHS	features 6 animated shorts
1993	The Compleat Tex Avery	LaserDisc	features 67 animated shorts on five discs (nine sides)
2007	Tex Avery's Droopy - The Complete Theatrical Collection	DVD	features 24 animated shorts on two discs
2020	Tex Avery Screwball Classics Vol. 1	Blu-ray	features 19 animated shorts
2020	Tex Avery Screwball Classics Vol. 2	Blu-ray	features 21 animated shorts
2021	Tex Avery Screwball Classics Vol. 3	Blu-ray	features 20 animated shorts

== Sources ==
- Barrier, Michael (2003), "Warner Bros., 1933-1940", Hollywood Cartoons: American Animation in Its Golden Age, Oxford University Press, ISBN 978-0199839223
- Cohen, Karl F. (2004), "Censorship of Theatrical Animation", Forbidden Animation: Censored Cartoons and Blacklisted Animators in America, McFarland & Company, ISBN 978-0786420322
- Sigall, Martha (2005). "The Boys of Termite Terrace". Living Life Inside the Lines: Tales from the Golden Age of Animation. University Press of Mississippi. ISBN 9781578067497.
