= Michael Lah =

American animator (1912–1995)

Michael Richard Lah (September 1, 1912 – October 13, 1995) was an American animator of Slovene origin. He is best remembered for his work at the Metro-Goldwyn-Mayer cartoon department, primarily as a member of Tex Avery's animation unit. He first worked on Tom and Jerry shorts before going to work on Droopy/Tex Avery shorts.

== Early life and career ==
Lah was born in Illinois. He worked briefly at Walt Disney Studios before joining Harman-Ising Productions in the mid-1930s. He later worked for MGM as an animator and director, remaining until the studio closed in 1957. During his MGM tenure, he animated for both the William Hanna/Joseph Barbera and Tex Avery units, and co-directed at various times with Preston Blair and Avery. He was promoted to the post of full-time director after Hanna and Barbera were made studio producers.

After he left MGM, he briefly rejoined Hanna and Barbera at their Hanna-Barbera television cartoon studio as an animator on The Huckleberry Hound Show and various other shows, then joined Quartet Films, a commercial animation studio that created television commercials for Kelloggs and Green Giant Foods. Some characters that Lah designed include Tony the Tiger, the Jolly Green Giant, Snap, Crackle and Pop, the Hamm's Beer Bear, and the Baltimore Orioles.

He was an active member of ASIFA-Hollywood, serving on the board for several years. In 1984, Lah received the Winsor McCay Award for his lifetime of work in the animation field.

== Personal life and death ==
He was married to Alberta Wogatzke, the twin sister of Violet Wogatzke (William Hanna's wife). Lah died on October 13, 1995, in Los Angeles, California.
