= See Ya Later Gladiator =

- Directed by: Alex Lovy
- Story by: Cal Howard
- Produced by: William L. Hendricks
- Starring: Mel Blanc
- Edited by: Hal Geer
- Music by: William Lava
- Animation by: Ted Bonnicksen; Laverne Harding; Volus Jones; Ed Solomon
- Layouts by: Bob Givens; Jaime Diaz
- Backgrounds by: Bob Abrams
- Color process: Technicolor
- Production company: Warner Bros.-Seven Arts Animation
- Distributed by: Warner Bros.-Seven Arts; Vitagraph Company of America
- Release date: June 29, 1968
- Running time: 7 minutes
- Language: English

See Ya Later Gladiator is a 1968 Warner Bros.-Seven Arts Looney Tunes cartoon directed by Alex Lovy. The short was released on June 29, 1968, and stars Daffy Duck and Speedy Gonzales.

Daffy and Speedy had been paired together in a series of cartoons from 1965 to 1968. This was their final theatrical pairing, and this was also the final theatrical short to star "classic" Warner Bros. characters as well as the last Golden Age of American Animation cartoon to feature Daffy or Speedy. After this short, until the cartoon division closed in 1969, new characters like Cool Cat, Bunny and Claude, Merlin the Magic Mouse, and a few one-shot cartoons made up all of WB's output.

== Plot ==
The plot concerns Daffy and Speedy accidentally being sent back in time via a time machine to Roma, 65 A.D. There, they offend a centurion who sends them to the lions as entertainment for Emperor Nero in a gladiator arena. Daffy and Speedy work together to thwart a lion. A pole catapults Daffy and Speedy to Nero's lap, breaking his fiddle. Nero, enraged, chases the two.

Back in the present timeline, the scientist discovers Daffy and Speedy being chased by a furious Nero, and brings all three of them to the present. However, Nero is horrified by this. Speedy helps him adjust until the scientist can bring him home. Daffy is about to go to bed when he hears music playing from outside from his room. Much to his dismay, it is Speedy's band playing again. Adding to his annoyance is that Nero has joined the band by playing his fiddle.

== See also ==
- List of American films of 1968
