= Golden age of American animation =

Period of animation in which theatrical sound cartoons were common and popular

Steamboat Willie (1928), the public debut of Mickey and Minnie Mouse and one of the earliest golden-age shorts

The golden age of American animation was a period that began with the popularization of sound synchronized cartoons in 1928 starting with Steamboat Willie, and gradually ended throughout the 1960s when theatrical animated cartoon film shorts lost ground to the newer medium of television. Animated media from after the golden age, especially on television, were produced on cheaper budgets and with more limited techniques starting in the late 1950s. Furthermore, the history of animation became very important artistically in the United States.

Multiple highly popular animated cartoon characters emerged from this period, including:

- Walt Disney Productions' Mickey Mouse, Minnie Mouse, Horace Horsecollar, Clarabelle Cow, Donald Duck, Daisy Duck, Scrooge McDuck, Ludwig Von Drake, Goofy, Pluto, Chip 'n' Dale, Humphrey the Bear, and Pete
- Fleischer Studios' Betty Boop, Bimbo, Koko the Clown, Popeye, Olive Oyl, Bluto, and Superman
- Warner Bros. Cartoons' Bugs Bunny, Daffy Duck, Porky Pig, Elmer Fudd, Wile E. Coyote and the Road Runner, Tweety, Sylvester, Granny, Yosemite Sam, Marvin the Martian, Tasmanian Devil, Foghorn Leghorn, Pepé Le Pew, and Speedy Gonzales
- MGM's Bosko, Barney Bear, Tom and Jerry and Droopy
- Walter Lantz Productions' Oswald the Lucky Rabbit, Woody Woodpecker, Andy Panda, and Chilly Willy
- Van Beuren Studios' The Little King, Molly Moo-Cow, Cubby Bear, and Milton Mouse
- Famous Studios' Little Audrey, Casper the Friendly Ghost, Herman and Katnip, Little Lulu, and Baby Huey
- Screen Gems' the Fox and the Crow, Krazy Kat, Scrappy, Li'l Abner, and Flippy and Flop
- Terrytoons' Farmer Al Falfa, Kiko the Kangaroo, Mighty Mouse, Heckle and Jeckle, Gandy Goose, Astronut, and Deputy Dawg
- UPA's Mr. Magoo and Gerald McBoing-Boing
- Pat Sullivan's Felix the Cat
- Jay Ward's Crusader Rabbit and early versions of Dudley Do-Right and Rocky and Bullwinkle
- Hanna-Barbera's Huckleberry Hound, Yogi Bear, Boo-Boo Bear, Loopy De Loop, Fred Flintstone, and Barney Rubble
- DePatie–Freleng Enterprises' the Pink Panther, the Inspector, and the Ant and the Aardvark

Over the course of these four decades, the quality of the media released throughout the golden age has often been debated. The peak of this era is usually cited as during the 1930s and 1940s. In later decades, namely between the 1950s and 1960s, the era is sometimes divided into a "silver age" due to the emergence of studios such as UPA, DePatie–Freleng Enterprises, Hanna-Barbera Productions, and Jay Ward Productions; these companies' presence in the industry grew significantly with the rise of television following the golden age's conclusion. At the same time, as the popularity of television animation grew, theatrical animation following the golden age fell into a creative slump and a period of low-budget production—generally referred to as the "bronze age"—spanning the 1970s and early 1980s.

Feature-length animation began during this period, most notably with Disney's "Walt-era" films, spanning from 1937's Snow White and the Seven Dwarfs and 1940's Pinocchio to 1967's The Jungle Book and 1970's The Aristocats (last animated films produced before Walt Disney's death in 1966). Including the contribution of the Fleischer Studios to the development of the animated feature film with Gulliver's Travels (1939) and Mr. Bug Goes to Town (1941). During this period, several live-action films incorporated animation, such as Saludos Amigos (1942), Anchors Aweigh (1945), Song of the South (1946), Fun and Fancy Free (1947), Dangerous When Wet (1953), Mary Poppins (1964) and Bedknobs and Broomsticks (1971). In addition, stop motion and special effects were also developed, with films such as King Kong (1933), The War of the Worlds (1953), The Beast from 20,000 Fathoms (1953), Them! (1954), Hansel and Gretel: An Opera Fantasy (1954), 20,000 Leagues Under the Sea (1954), Forbidden Planet (1956), The 7th Voyage of Sinbad (1958), Jason and the Argonauts (1963), Fantastic Voyage (1966) and 2001: A Space Odyssey (1968).

Animation also began on television during this period with Telecomics (the first animated series broadcast in 1949), Jim and Judy in Teleland (1949), and Crusader Rabbit (1950). The rise of television animation is often considered to be a factor that hastened the golden age's end. However, various authors include Hanna-Barbera's earliest animated series through 1962 as part of the golden age, with shows like Ruff and Reddy (1957), Huckleberry Hound (1958), Quick Draw McGraw (1959), The Flintstones (1960), Yogi Bear (1961), Top Cat (1961), Wally Gator (1962) and The Jetsons (1962), including the theatrical cartoons released by Columbia Pictures such as Loopy De Loop (1959) and the feature films released between 1964 and 1966. Huckleberry Hound became the first animated television series to win an Emmy Award (for Outstanding Children's Program).

== Major studios ==
=== Walt Disney Productions ===
Mickey Mouse, Disney's flagship mascot, gained popularity worldwide.

==== Beginnings ====
Walt Disney had originally planned to become a newspaper cartoonist drawing political caricatures and comic strips. However, nobody would hire him, so his older brother Roy, who was working as a banker at the time, got him a job at the Pesmen-Rubin Art Studio where he created advertisements for newspapers, magazines, and movie theaters. Here he met fellow cartoonist Ub Iwerks. The two quickly became friends, and in January 1920, when their time at the studio expired, they decided to open up their own advertising agency together called Iwerks-Disney Commercial Artists. The business, however, got off to a rough start and Disney temporarily left for the Kansas City Film and Ad Co. to raise money for the fleeting company and Iwerks soon followed as he was unable to run the business alone.

While working there he made commercials for local theaters using crude cut-out animation. Disney became fascinated by the art and decided to become an animator. He then borrowed a camera from work and rented a book from the local library called Animated Cartoons: How They Are Made, Their Origin and Development by Edwin G. Lutz, decided that cel animation would produce better quality, and decided to open up his own animation studio. Disney then teamed up with Fred Harman and made their first film, The Little Artist which was nothing more than an artist (Disney) taking a cigarette break at his work desk. Harman soon dropped out of the venture, but Disney was able to strike a deal with local theater owner Frank L. Newman and animated a cartoon by himself entitled Newman Laugh-O-Grams screened in roughly February 1921. Disney then quit his job at the film and ad company and incorporated Laugh-O-Gram Films in May 1922, and hired former advertising colleagues as unpaid "students" of animation including Ub Iwerks and Fred Harman's brother, Hugh Harman.

Throughout 1922, the Disney company produced a series of "modernized" adaptations of fairy tales including Little Red Riding Hood, The Four Musicians of Bremen, Jack and the Beanstalk, Jack the Giant Killer, Goldielocks and the Three Bears, Puss in Boots, Cinderella and Tommy Tucker's Tooth, the latter being mostly a live-action film about dental hygiene. None of these films turned a profit. The last film made by the Disney company was a short called Alice's Wonderland. Loosely inspired by Lewis Carroll's Alice's Adventures in Wonderland, the short featured a live-action five-year-old girl named Alice (Virginia Davis) who had adventures in a fully animated world. The film was never fully completed, however, as the studio went bankrupt in the summer of 1923.

Upon the closure of Laugh-O-Grams, Walt Disney worked as a freelance filmmaker before selling his camera for a one-way ticket to Los Angeles. Upon arrival, he moved in with his Uncle Robert and his brother Roy, who was recovering at a nearby government hospital from tuberculosis he had suffered during World War I. After failing to get a job as a director of live-action films he sent the unfinished Alice's Wonderland reel to short-subjects distributor Margaret J. Winkler of Winkler Pictures in New York. Winkler was distributing both the Felix the Cat and Out of the Inkwell cartoons at the time, but the Fleischer brothers were about to leave to set up their own distribution company, Red Seal Films, and Felix producer Pat Sullivan was constantly fighting with Winkler; therefore, Winkler agreed to produce and distribute Disney's Alice Comedies as a kind of insurance policy.

Once Walt Disney received the notice on October 15, he convinced Roy to leave the hospital and help him set up his business. The next day, on October 16, 1923, Disney Bros. Cartoon Studio opened its doors at a small rented office two blocks away from his uncle's house with Roy managing business and Walt handling creative affairs. He persuaded Virginia Davis's parents to bring her to Los Angeles to star in the films. The first official Alice short, Alice's Day at Sea, was released on January 1, 1924, delayed by eleven days. Ub Iwerks was re-hired in February 1925 and the quality of animation on the Alice series improved; this prompted Hugh Harman, Rudolf Ising, and Carman Maxwell to follow Disney west in June 1925. Around that time, Davis was replaced with Maggie Gay and the cartoons started to focus less on the live-action scenes and more the fully animated scenes, particularly those featuring Alice's pet sidekick Julius, who bore an uncanny resemblance to Felix the Cat, which Winkler distributed. In February 1926, Disney moved to a larger studio at 2719 Hyperion Avenue.

In November 1923, Winkler married Charles Mintz and handed over the business to him when she became pregnant a few months later. Mintz was often described as a cold, stern and ruthless chain-smoking tyrant; one employee remembered him as "a grim-faced man, with a pair of cold eyes glittering behind the pince nez" who "never talked to the staff. He looked us over like an admiral surveying a row of stanchions." While Winkler had offered gentle critiques and encouragement, Mintz communicated to Disney in a harsh and cruel tone. In 1927, Mintz ordered Disney to stop producing Alice Comedies due to the costs of combining live-action and animation.

Mintz managed to gain a distribution deal with Universal Pictures after dropping Winkler's own distribution services. Disney and lead animator Ub Iwerks created the successful Oswald the Lucky Rabbit series, who debuted in Trolley Troubles short in 1927.

In the spring of 1928, Disney travelled to New York to ask Mintz for a budget increase. His request was harshly denied by Mintz, who pointed out that in the contract Mintz had signed with Universal, it was Universal—not Disney—that owned the rights to the character. Mintz revealed to Disney that he had hired most of his staff away from the studio (except for Ub Iwerks, Les Clark and Wilfred Jackson who refused to leave) and threatened that unless he took a 20 percent budget decrease, he would drop Disney and continue the Oswald series by himself. Disney refused and left the company with Iwerks, Roy O. Disney and some animators. Winkler continued to mismanage the studio, leading to Universal reclaiming the character and opening an in-house studio, led by Winkler employees Walter Lantz and Bill Nolan, to produce the series.

==== Mickey Mouse ====
While Walt Disney was finishing the remaining cartoons for Mintz, he and his staff secretly came up with a new cartoon character to replace Oswald: Mickey Mouse. In 1928, Plane Crazy became the first entry into the Mickey Mouse series; however, it was not released because of a poor reaction from test screenings and failed to gain a distributor. The second Mickey Mouse cartoon The Gallopin' Gaucho also failed to gain the attention of a distributor. Disney knew what was missing: sound. Sound film had been captivating audiences since 1927 with The Jazz Singer and Walt decided that the next cartoon Steamboat Willie would have sound. Steamboat Willie was not the first sound cartoon, Max and Dave Fleischer had produced Song Car-Tunes since 1926 after the release of the sound film Don Juan. However, they failed to keep the sound synchronized with the animation and the main focus of the cartoons were the bouncing ball sing-a-longs. The Song Car-Tunes were not a success and some staff members doubted whether a cartoon with sound would be successful. Disney arranged a special preview screening with the music and sound effects being played live behind stage through a microphone. The Steamboat Willie test screening was a success and managed to gain a distributor, Celebrity Pictures chief Pat Powers. However, the first attempt to synchronize the sound with the animation was a disaster. In order to finance the second recording, Disney sold his car. This time he used a click track to keep his musicians on the beat (he later learned that it was easier to record the dialogue, music and sound effects first and animate to the sound). Little more than a month before Steamboat Willie′s premiere, Paul Terry released his sound cartoon Dinner Time; however it was not a financial success and Disney described it as "a bunch of racket".

==== The Golden Age of Disney ====
Golden Age of Disney Film era
- Years: 1937–1942

Films and television
- Films: Snow White and the Seven Dwarfs; Pinocchio; Fantasia; Dumbo; Bambi
- Short films: The Barn Dance; Flowers and Trees; Three Little Pigs; The Chain Gang; Mickey's Revue; The Wise Little Hen; The Band Concert; The Old Mill
- Animated series: Silly Symphony

Audio
- Original music: "Who's Afraid of the Big Bad Wolf?"

===== Beginnings (1920s–1930s) =====
Steamboat Willie was released on November 18, 1928, and was a massive success. Disney quickly gained huge dominance in the animation field using sound in his future cartoons by dubbing Plane Crazy, The Gallopin' Gaucho and the nearly completed The Barn Dance. Mickey Mouse's popularity put the animated character into the ranks of the most popular screen personalities in the world. Disney's biggest competitor, Pat Sullivan with his Felix the Cat, was eclipsed by Mickey's popularity and the studio closed in 1932.

Merchandising based on Disney cartoons rescued a number of companies from bankruptcy during the depths of the Depression, and Disney took advantage of this popularity to move forward with further innovations in animation. In 1929, he launched a new anthology series titled Silly Symphony. However, they did not become as popular as the Mickey Mouse cartoon series.

In 1930, after a falling-out with Powers, Disney switched distributors to Columbia Pictures. However, Ub Iwerks left Disney after an offer from Powers to be in charge of his own studio.

In 1932, Mickey Mouse had become an international sensation, but the Silly Symphonies had not. Columbia Pictures had backed out of its distribution of the series and Disney was lured to move the Silly Symphonies to United Artists by a budget increase. Disney then worked with the Technicolor company to create the first full three-strip color cartoon, Flowers and Trees. Another great success, it became the first cartoon to win the Academy Award for Best Animated Short Film. Shortly afterward, Disney negotiated an exclusive, but temporary, deal with Technicolor so only he could use the three-strip process in animated films—no other studio was permitted to use it. However, he withheld making Mickey Mouse in color because he thought that Technicolor might boost the Silly Symphonies′ popularity.

By 1932, Disney had realized that the success of animated films depended upon telling emotionally gripping stories that would grab the audience and not let go. This realization led to an important innovation around 1932–1933: a "story department", separate from the animators, with storyboard artists who would be dedicated to working on a "story development" phase of the production pipeline. In turn, Disney's continued emphasis on story development and characterization resulted in another hit in 1933: Three Little Pigs, which is seen as the first cartoon in which multiple characters displayed unique, individual personalities and has been described as the most successful animated short of all time, and also featured the hit song that became the anthem in fighting the Great Depression: "Who's Afraid of the Big Bad Wolf". In the Mickey Mouse series, he continued to add personality to his characters; this resulted in the creation of new characters such as Pluto with The Chain Gang in 1930, Goofy with Mickey's Revue in 1932, and Donald Duck in 1934 with The Wise Little Hen (under the Silly Symphony series). When Disney's contract with Technicolor expired, the Mickey Mouse series was moved into Technicolor starting with The Band Concert in 1935. In addition, Mickey was partially redesigned for Technicolor later that year. In 1937, William Garity developed Disney's multiplane camera, which gave a sophisticated illusion of depth to his animated productions. He first used this on the Academy Award-winning Silly Symphony cartoon The Old Mill. Much of Disney's work was heavily influenced by European stories and myths, and the work of illustrators such as Doré and Busch. Also in 1937, Disney changed distributors for the Silly Symphonies to RKO Radio Pictures, remaining with this distributor until the early 1950s, when they were re-issued and re-released by Disney's new distribution company, Buena Vista Distribution.

===== Snow White and the Seven Dwarfs (1937) =====
In 1937, Disney produced Snow White and the Seven Dwarfs, the first American feature-length animated musical fantasy film. This was the culmination of four years of effort by Disney studios. Disney was convinced that short cartoons would not keep his studio profitable in the long run, so he took what was seen as an enormous gamble. The critics predicted that Snow White would result in financial ruin for the studio. They said that the colors would be too bright for the audience and they would get sick of the gags and leave. However, the critics were proven wrong. Snow White was a worldwide box office success, and was universally acclaimed as a landmark in the development of animation as a serious art form.

===== Pinocchio and Fantasia (1940) =====
After the success of Snow White, Disney went on to produce Pinocchio, which was released in 1940. However, costing twice as much to make as Snow White, Pinocchio was not a financial success, since World War II (which began in Europe in 1939) had cut off 40 percent of Disney's foreign release market. Although it was a moderate success in the United States, the domestic gross alone was not enough to make back its production budget. However, the film did receive very positive reviews and has made millions from subsequent re-releases. Later that year, Disney produced Fantasia. It originally started with the Mickey Mouse cartoon The Sorcerer's Apprentice in an attempt to recapture Mickey's popularity, which had sharply declined due to the popularity of Max Fleischer's Popeye and Disney's Donald Duck. In the Sorcerer's Apprentice, Mickey Mouse was redesigned by Fred Moore. This redesign of Mickey is still in use today. The short featured no dialogue, only music which was conducted by Leopold Stokowski. When the budget for the short grew very expensive, Stokowski suggested to Disney that it could be a feature film with other pieces of classical music matched to animation. Disney agreed and production started. Fantasia also became the first commercial film to be released in stereophonic sound. However, like Pinocchio, Fantasia was not a financial success. Fantasia was also the first Disney film not to be received well, receiving mixed reviews from the critics. It was looked down upon by music critics and audiences, who felt that Disney was striving for something beyond his reach by trying to introduce mainstream animation to abstract art, classical music, and "elite" subjects. However, the film would be re-evaluated in later years and considered an animated masterpiece.

===== Dumbo and Bambi (1941–1942) =====
In 1941, in order to compensate for the relative poor box office of Pinocchio and Fantasia, Disney produced a low-budget feature film, Dumbo. Just a few days after rough animation was complete on Dumbo, the Disney animators' strike broke out. This was caused by the Screen Cartoonist's Guild (which had been formed in 1938), who severed many ties between Walt Disney and his staff, while encouraging many members of the Disney studio to leave and seek greener pastures. Later that year, Dumbo became a big success, the first for Disney since Snow White. The critically acclaimed film brought in much-needed revenue and kept the studio afloat. A few months after Dumbo was released in 1941, the United States entered the war after the attack on Pearl Harbor. This led to the mobilization of all movie studios (including their cartoon divisions) to produce propaganda material to bolster public confidence and encourage support for the war effort. The war (along with the strike) shook Disney's empire, as the US Army had seized Disney's studio as soon as the US entered World War II in December 1941. As a result, Disney put the feature films Song of the South (1946), Mickey and the Beanstalk and Bongo (ultimately combined as the feature Fun and Fancy Free, 1947), The Wind in the Willows (ultimately released as part of the feature The Adventures of Ichabod and Mr. Toad, 1949), Alice in Wonderland (1951), and Peter Pan (1953), on hold until the war was over.

The only feature film that was allowed to continue production was Bambi, which was released in 1942. Bambi was groundbreaking in terms of animating animals realistically. However, due to the war, the film failed at the box office and received mixed reviews from the critics. This failure was to be short-lived as it grossed a considerable amount of money in the 1947 re-release.

==== Wartime Era of Disney ====
Wartime Era of Disney Film era
- Years: 1943–1949

Films and television
- Films: Saludos Amigos; The Three Caballeros; Make Mine Music; Song of the South; Fun and Fancy Free; Melody Time; So Dear to My Heart; The Adventures of Ichabod and Mr. Toad
- Short films: Der Fuehrer's Face; Education for Death; Reason and Emotion; The New Spirit; Commando Duck

Disney was now fully committed to the war effort and contributed by producing propaganda shorts and a feature film entitled Victory Through Air Power. This feature did poorly at the box office and the studio lost around $500,000 as a result. The required propaganda cartoon shorts were less popular than Disney's regular shorts, and by the time the Army ended its stay at Walt Disney Studios with the end of the war in 1945, Disney struggled to restart his studio, and had little cash on hand. Further Disney feature films of the 1940s were modestly budgeted collections of animated short segments put together to make a feature film. These began with Saludos Amigos in 1942 and continued during the war with The Three Caballeros in 1944 and after the war with Make Mine Music in 1946, Fun and Fancy Free in 1947, Melody Time in 1948, and The Adventures of Ichabod and Mr. Toad in 1949. The planned feature films Mickey and the Beanstalk, Bongo, and The Wind in the Willows were condensed into the package films Fun and Fancy Free and The Adventures of Ichabod and Mr. Toad since he feared that the low-budget animation would not become profitable. The most ambitious Disney film of this period was the 1946 film Song of the South, a musical film blending live-action and animation which drew criticism in later years for accusations of racial stereotyping.

==== The Silver Age of Disney (1950–1971) ====
Silver Age of Disney Film era
- Years: 1950–1971

Films and television
- Films: Cinderella; Alice in Wonderland; Peter Pan; Lady and the Tramp; Sleeping Beauty; One Hundred and One Dalmatians; The Sword in the Stone; Mary Poppins; The Jungle Book; The Love Bug; The Aristocats; Bedknobs and Broomsticks
- Short films: The Simple Things; The Litterbug; Winnie the Pooh and the Honey Tree; Scrooge McDuck and Money; Winnie the Pooh and the Blustery Day; It's Tough to Be a Bird

===== Early 1950s =====
In 1950, Disney produced Cinderella. This was an enormous success, becoming the highest-grossing film of 1950, and became Disney's most successful film since Snow White and the Seven Dwarfs and Disney's first single-narrative feature film to be entirely animated since Bambi, as the films since then had either been anthology films or involved some live-action. Disney's company started to diversify, producing live-action feature films beginning with Treasure Island (1950) and nature documentaries, the first of which was Seal Island (1948). As a result, Disney was needed on several different units at one time and spent less time on animation. In 1951, he released Alice in Wonderland, a project he had been working on since the late 1930s, though it was shelved during the war. Alice in Wonderland was initially moderately successful and received mixed reviews from the critics. A few decades later, the film was hailed as one of Disney's greatest classics, making millions in subsequent theatrical and home video releases. In 1953, he released Peter Pan, which, like Alice in Wonderland, had been in production since the late 1930s/early 1940s and was shelved during the war. However, unlike Alice, Peter Pan was a big success both critically and financially on its first release.

When Disney's contract with RKO expired at the end of 1953, he was concerned about RKO's instability due to owner Howard Hughes' increasingly erratic control of the studio. Rather than renewing the RKO contract, Disney started distributing films through the newly created Buena Vista Distribution subsidiary. This allowed a higher budget for shorts and features than the last few years of cartoons made for RKO dictated, which made it possible to make some of the cartoons in the new CinemaScope format. However, the budget per short was nowhere near as high as it had been in the 1940s as Disney had been focusing more on live action, television, and feature animation and less on short animation. In 1953, shortly after the switch from RKO to Buena Vista, Disney released its final Mickey Mouse short, The Simple Things. From there, the studio produced fewer animated shorts by the year until the animated shorts division was eventually closed in 1956. After that, any future short cartoon work was done through the feature animation division until 1969. The last Disney animated short of the golden age of American animation, the Oscar-winning It's Tough to Be a Bird!, was released in 1969.

===== Late 1950s – 1960s =====
In 1955, Disney created Lady and the Tramp, the first animated film in CinemaScope. Upon building Disneyland in 1955, Walt Disney regained a huge amount of popularity among the public, and turned his focus to producing his most ambitious movie: Sleeping Beauty. This was filmed in Super Technirama 70 mm film and in stereophonic sound like Fantasia. Sleeping Beauty also signaled a change in the style of drawing, with cartoony and angular characters, taking influence from UPA. Although it was the second-highest-grossing film of 1959 (just behind Ben-Hur), Sleeping Beauty went over budget, costing $6 million, and the film failed to make back its expenditure. The studio was in serious debt and had to cut the cost of animation. In 1960, this resulted in Disney switching to xerography, which replaced the traditional hand-inking. The first feature films that used Xerox cels were 101 Dalmatians (1961) and The Sword in the Stone (1963) which were box-office successes. However, the Xerox resulted in films with a "sketchier" look and lacked the quality of the hand-inked films. According to Floyd Norman, who was working at Disney at the time, it felt like the end of an era.

The Silver Age came to a defining close with the passing of Walt Disney on December 15, 1966. His death left the studio without its visionary leader, causing uncertainty about its future direction. Many of the projects he had personally overseen were completed posthumously, and the company began a gradual transition toward a new creative era, carrying forward his legacy while facing the challenge of maintaining the distinct artistic and storytelling standards he had set.

=== Paramount Pictures ===
Paramount distributed Pat Sullivan's Felix the Cat series before Sullivan settled with Winkler Pictures, who ironically also sought distribution from Paramount for their Krazy Kat series. Winkler's contract was terminated after the company lost Oswald the Lucky Rabbit to Universal Pictures.

==== Creation ====
One of Walt Disney's main competitors was Max Fleischer, the head of Fleischer Studios, which produced cartoons for Paramount Pictures. Fleischer Studios was a family-owned business, operated by Max Fleischer and his younger brother Dave, who supervised the production of the cartoons. The Fleischers scored successes with the Betty Boop cartoons and the Popeye the Sailor series. Popeye's popularity during the 1930s rivaled Mickey Mouse at times, and Popeye fan clubs sprang up across the country in imitation of Mickey's fan clubs; in 1935, polls showed that Popeye was even more popular than Mickey Mouse. However, during the early 1930s, stricter censorship rules enforced by the new Production Code in 1934 required animation producers to remove risqué humor. The Fleischers, in particular, had to tone down the content of their Betty Boop cartoons, which waned in popularity afterwards. The Fleischers also produced a number of Color Classics cartoons during the 1930s which attempted to emulate Walt Disney's use of color, but the series was not a success.

===== Feature-length films =====
In 1934, Max Fleischer became interested in producing an animated feature film shortly after Walt Disney's announcement of Snow White, but Paramount vetoed the idea. In 1936, Fleischer Studios produced the first of three two-reel Popeye Technicolor features: Popeye the Sailor Meets Sindbad the Sailor in 1936, Popeye the Sailor Meets Ali Baba's Forty Thieves in 1937, and Aladdin and His Wonderful Lamp in 1939. In 1938, after Disney's success with Snow White and the Seven Dwarfs, Paramount gave the Fleischers permission to produce an animated feature film and Fleischer studio relocated itself from New York to Miami, Florida in order to avoid organized unions, which became a threat to the studio after a five-month strike occurred among Fleischer Studio workers in late 1937. Fleischer Studios also sought to rapidly expand the studio's staff by hiring numerous West Coast artists, including animators and writers from Disney, Warner, and MGM. Here the Fleischers produced Gulliver's Travels which was released in 1939. It was a small success and encouraged the Fleischers to produce more.

===== Superman and the fall of Fleischer =====
On May 24, 1941, the Fleischers gave Paramount full ownership of the studio as collateral to pay off their increasing debts left from the loans they had obtained from the studio, as well as to offset the lack of revenue from unsuccessful cartoons like Stone Age, Gabby, and Animated Antics. However, they still maintained their positions as heads of their studio's production. Under Paramount rule, the Fleischers brought Popeye into the Navy and contributed to the war effort, and gained more success by beginning a series of spectacular Superman cartoons (the first of which was nominated for an Oscar) that have become legendary in themselves. Despite the success Superman gave the studio, a major blow to the studio occurred when the married Dave started having an adulterous affair with a secretary. This led to many disputes between the Fleischer brothers until Max and Dave were no longer speaking to each other.

The studio planned to release their next film, Mr. Bug Goes to Town, on Christmas day. But following initial press screening on December 4, the film was shelved for unknown reasons, though these screenings occurred just two days before the Attack on Pearl Harbor. Mr. Bug saw a very limited release by Paramount in the UK, California, and New York the following year, causing it to fail at the box office. Dave Fleischer, still maintaining his position as co-chief of his studio, had already left Fleischer Studios to work for Columbia Pictures' Screen Gems studio on November 22, 1941. Max also resigned in December and confirmed to Paramount president Barney Balaban in January the following year. Max and Dave agreed to surrender all studio assets to Paramount, which severed the brothers' control from Fleischer Studios completely.

Paramount renamed the studio to Famous Studios on May 22, 1942, but did not fully incorporate the studio until three days later, when the company's contract with the Fleischer brothers ran its course. The studio, in the meantime, continued to release a backlog of completed Fleischer cartoons until August of that year, with the Superman short Terror on the Midway (1942) being the last cartoon released under the Fleischer Studios brand.

==== Famous Studios ====
===== Turnaround efforts by Paramount =====
In the wake of the Fleischer brothers' departure, Paramount promoted three top employees, Isadore Sparber, Seymour Kneitel (Max Fleischer's son-in-law), and Dan Gordon as production supervisors, while Sam Buchwald was designated as executive producer. Paramount also discontinued the expensive Superman cartoons in 1943, instead adapting Marge's Little Lulu comic strip to theaters, as well as downsizing the studio and moving it back to New York City earlier that year.

In concept, Famous Studios continued where Fleischer Studios ended off, with the studio continuing to produce Popeye cartoons, which shifted to color in 1943, as well as creating Noveltoons, an anthology short series similar to Fleischer's Color Classics. The Noveltoons shorts series introduced many of Famous' recurring characters such as Blackie the Lamb, Wolfie (Blackie's main rival), Casper the Friendly Ghost (created by Joe Oriolo and Seymour Reit from an unpublished children's book), Little Audrey (a character similar to and replacing Little Lulu), Herman and Katnip (a cat and mouse duel similar to Tom and Jerry), and Baby Huey. Famous also revived Screen Songs, another series inherited from Fleischer Studios. The series was renamed Kartunes in 1951 and continued for two more years before being discontinued. Buchwald died from a heart attack in 1951, leaving Sparber and Kneitel as the sole producers. Dave Tendlar was promoted to director in 1953.

===== Decline and closure =====
The departure of the Fleischer brothers had a prolonged effect on the studio: the Paramount cartoons of the 1940s continued to be entertaining and popular and still retained most of the Fleischer style and gloss; however, animation fans and historians noted the studio's diverging tone by the turn of the decade, as the style was criticized for its highly formulaic story telling, a shifted appeal geared more towards children, unusually violent gags, and a lack of artistic ambition or sophistication that management under the Fleischer brothers had striven for.

By October 1956, Paramount gained further control of the studio by downsizing it again and renaming it to Paramount Cartoon Studios. The following year, the studio ended Popeye's theatrical run, with Spooky Swabs (directed by Sparber, who died the next year) being the last short of the series. Stricter budgets forced the studio to use limited animation techniques comparable to television animation at the time. Paramount continued to release theatrical cartoons into the 1960s, but also began dabbling in television production, such as co-producing the Popeye the Sailor TV series, The New Casper Cartoon Show and Felix the Cat. Their new theatrical cartoons at this time included Modern Madcaps, The Cat, Swifty and Shorty, and Comic Kings. Paramount also distributed a handful of cartoons from Rembrandt Films, most notably a series of shorts featuring the character Nudnik, created by Gene Deitch.

Kneitel's death in 1964 brought sudden changes to the studio as Paramount now had to look for new artists. Cartoonist Howard Post was initially placed as the studio's primary director, and created Honey Halfwitch. However, Post's tenure was not successful, and even angered Paramount's board of directors with the cartoon Two By Two (1966), a lampoon of Noah's Ark that not only included a clone of Warner's Daffy Duck, but was also accused of having anti-religious overtones. Post was replaced in late 1965 by James Culhane who wanted to diversify the studio's content, but he also left in 1967 due to growing conflicts with studio management. Ex-Terrytoons animator Ralph Bakshi succeeded Culhane that year, and quickly put several shorts into production. But Paramount's new owners, Gulf+Western, began the process to shut the cartoon studio, which was completed by December.

=== Warner Bros. ===
A Tale of Two Kitties (1942), the debut of Tweety

==== Harman-Ising era ====
In 1929, former Disney animators Hugh Harman and Rudolf Ising made a proof-of-concept cartoon for their character Bosko and tried to sell it to a distributor in 1930. Warner Bros. Pictures, which had previously made an unsuccessful attempt to set up a cartoon studio in New York in order to compete with Disney, agreed to distribute the series. Under producer Leon Schlesinger's guidance, Harman-Ising Productions created Looney Tunes (the title being a variation on Disney's award-winning Silly Symphonies) starring Bosko. A second Harman-Ising series, Merrie Melodies, followed in 1931. Both series showed the strong influence of the early Disney movies.

==== Harman-Ising break away ====
After disputes over money, Harman-Ising parted ways with Schlesinger (who rejected their demands for raised budgets) in 1933, taking Bosko with them to work with Metro-Goldwyn-Mayer. Schlesinger began his own cartoon operation under the new name Leon Schlesinger Productions. Animators Tom Palmer and Earl Duvall were assigned as directors, with Palmer creating a Bosko clone known as Buddy; meanwhile, Schlesinger responded to Walt Disney's use of color by making Merrie Melodies cartoons in color starting in 1934. However, since Disney had an exclusive deal with Technicolor, Schlesinger was forced to use Cinecolor and two-strip Technicolor until 1935 when Disney's contract with Technicolor had expired.

The new studio had a rocky start as Buddy failed to be a successful replacement for Bosko due to his bland personality. Tom Palmer's inexperience as a director resulted in him being terminated by Schlesinger. Duvall was also later fired following a drunken confrontation. Schlesinger decided to re-hire several Harman-Ising animators (including Friz Freleng) to run the studio instead. Buddy was phased out by 1935.

==== Creation of new stars ====
Friz Freleng's 1935 cartoon I Haven't Got a Hat was the first screen appearance of Porky Pig. That same year, Schlesinger hired a new animation director who proceeded to revitalize the studio: Tex Avery. Schlesinger put Avery in charge of the low-budget Looney Tunes in a low run-down old building the animators named Termite Terrace. Under Avery, Porky Pig replaced the Buddy series and became the first Warner Bros. cartoon character to achieve star power. Also at Termite Terrace, animator Bob Clampett redesigned Porky from a fat, chubby pig to a more cute and childlike character.

Unlike the other cartoon producers at the time, Avery had no intention of competing with Walt Disney, but instead brought a new wacky, zany style of animation to the studio that increased the Warner Bros. cartoons' popularity in the crowded marketplace. This was firmly established in 1937 when Tex Avery directed Porky's Duck Hunt. During production of the short, lead animator Bob Clampett elaborated the exit of the duck character by having him jump up and down on his head, flip around and holler off into the sunset. This created the character of Daffy Duck. After Daffy was created, he added even more success to Warner Bros. cartoons and replaced Porky Pig as the studio's most popular animated character. The high demand for more cartoons resulted in Schlesinger subcontracting Ub Iwerks to make some shorts with his own animation unit, with Clampett and Chuck Jones being brought in to assist. Iwerks directed only two shorts before he was succeeded by Clampett.

Freleng left Warner Bros. for two years in 1938 when he was lured to a newly formed animation department by MGM. In the meantime, his replacements, writer Ben Hardaway and animator Cal Dalton, created a rabbit character who first appeared in Porky's Hare Hunt (1938). The character, having a personality similar to Daffy's, became the basis of development for Warner Bros.' biggest star, Bugs Bunny. Bugs made his official debut in Avery's 1940 Academy Award-nominated cartoon A Wild Hare, paired with Elmer Fudd (who had also been created by Avery in preliminary form three years prior). Bugs quickly replaced Daffy as the studio's top star. By 1942, he had become the most popular cartoon character. Because of the success of Bugs, Daffy and Porky, the Schlesinger studio now had risen to new heights, and Bugs quickly became the star of the color Merrie Melodies cartoons, which had previously been used for one-shot character appearances. Avery left Warner Bros. in 1941 and moved to MGM after having feuds with Scheshinger over the ending of The Heckling Hare and the rejection for an idea of a short series of live-action animals with animated mouths (which he later sold to Paramount Pictures to create the Speaking with Animals series of shorts). Clampett took over Avery's unit while Norman McCabe took over Clampett's black-and-white unit. By 1942, Warners' shorts had surpassed Disney's in sales and popularity.

Frank Tashlin also worked with Avery in the Merrie Melodies department. He began at Warner in 1933 as an animator but was fired and joined Iwerks in 1934. Tashlin returned to Warners in 1936, taking over direction of the Merrie Melodies department, but left again in 1938, with his position soon taken by Chuck Jones. He returned in 1943 after McCabe was drafted into the army, but left again for the final time in late 1944 to direct live-action films. Robert McKimson, who had an extensive career at the studio up to that point, was appointed to director to replace Tashlin.

==== Warner Bros. Cartoons ====
Schlesinger sold his studio to Warner Bros. Pictures in August 1944, and Edward Selzer was in turn named the new producer. By this time, Warner cartoons' top directors were Friz Freleng, Chuck Jones, Bob Clampett and Robert McKimson. Their cartoons are now considered classics of the medium. They directed some of the most beloved animated shorts of all time, including Clampett's Porky in Wackyland, Wabbit Twouble, A Corny Concerto, The Great Piggy Bank Robbery, and The Big Snooze; Freleng's You Ought to Be in Pictures, Rhapsody in Rivets, Little Red Riding Rabbit, Birds Anonymous, and Knighty Knight Bugs; Jones's Rabbit Fire, Duck Amuck, Duck Dodgers in the 24½th Century, One Froggy Evening, and What's Opera, Doc?; and McKimson's Walky Talky Hawky, Hillbilly Hare, Devil May Hare, The Hole Idea and Stupor Duck.

Besides McKimson being promoted to director in the mid-1940s, Arthur Davis took over Clampett's unit in mid-1945 after Clampett abruptly left the studio. Clampett went to work on Beany and Cecil. Many of the studios most well-known recurring characters were created or reestablished following the Warner acquisition. These included Tweety (1942), Pepé Le Pew (1945), Sylvester the Cat (1945), Yosemite Sam (1945), Foghorn Leghorn (1946), the Goofy Gophers (1947), Marvin the Martian (1948), Wile E. Coyote and the Road Runner (1949), Granny (1950), Speedy Gonzales (1953), and The Tasmanian Devil (1954), among others. Davis' unit was shut down in late 1947 by Warner's due to budget issues, causing him to move to Freleng's unit to become one of his key animators.

In 1948, Warners could no longer force theaters to buy their movies and shorts together as packages, due to the United States v. Paramount Pictures, Inc. anti-trust case that year. It resulted in the shorts having to be produced on increasingly tighter budgets as time went on. Warner Bros. also closed their entire animation department in 1953 due to the immense popularity of 3D films, but reopened the following year after the end of the 3-D craze. Selzer retired in 1958, with production manager John W. Burton taking his place. David H. DePatie assumed the role as producer in 1960 after Burton also left the studio.

==== DePatie–Freleng Enterprises and Warner Bros.–Seven Arts ====
After more than two decades at the top, Warner Bros. shut down the original Termite Terrace studio in 1963. That same year, Freleng and DePatie formed their own studio, DePatie–Freleng Enterprises, which assumed production of Looney Tunes following an agreement with Warner Bros. Most of the Looney Tunes characters were retired from theaters during this time, including Warner's biggest star, Bugs Bunny. Daffy Duck, however, still appeared in theatrical cartoons, mostly paired with Speedy Gonzales.

Fourteen original Wile E. Coyote and Road Runner cartoons were also commissioned, 11 of which were outsourced to Format Films as DePatie–Freleng was swamped with work while also producing The Pink Panther cartoons for United Artists. The outsourced cartoons, directed by former Chuck Jones animator Rudy Larriva and nicknamed "The Larriva Eleven", were not well received and were criticized for their inability to recapture the spirit and charm of Jones' original cartoons.

After DePatie–Freleng ceased production of Looney Tunes in 1967, William L. Hendricks was put in charge of production of the newly renamed Warner Bros.–Seven Arts animation studio and hired veterans such as Alex Lovy and LaVerne Harding from the Walter Lantz studio; Volus Jones and Ed Solomon from Disney; Jaime Diaz, who later worked on The Fairly OddParents as director; and David Hanan, who previously worked on Roger Ramjet. Hendricks brought only three of the original Looney Tunes veterans to the studio: Ted Bonniscken, Norman McCabe, and Robert Givens. Under Hendricks and Lovy, the studios continued making Daffy-Speedy cartoons and created new characters such as Cool Cat and Merlin the Magic Mouse. Despite this, the cartoons of this era were critically panned and are widely considered to be the worst in the studio's history (despite Norman Normal gaining a cult following).

Lovy left the studio in 1968 and Robert McKimson was brought back to take over. McKimson used the pre-1967 characters only in bumpers for The Bugs Bunny-Road Runner Show and in advertisements; otherwise, he mostly focused on the recurring characters Alex Lovy had created and two of his own creation, Bunny and Claude. The last of the original Looney Tunes shorts produced was Bugged by a Bee (1969) and the last Merrie Melodies short was Injun Trouble (1969), which shares its name with another Looney Tunes short from 1938. The Warner Bros.–Seven Arts studio finally shut down in 1969. A total of 1,039 Looney Tunes shorts had been created.

A decade later, after the success of the film, The Bugs Bunny/Road Runner Movie, which consisted predominantly of footage from the classic shorts by Jones, a new in-house studio to produce original animation opened its doors in 1980 named Warner Bros. Animation, which exists to this day.

=== Metro-Goldwyn-Mayer ===
==== Ub Iwerks' cartoons ====
At first, Mickey Mouse was drawn by Walt Disney's long-time partner and friend Ub Iwerks, who was also a technical innovator in cartoons, and drew an average of 600 drawings for Disney on a daily basis; Disney was responsible for the ideas in the cartoons, and Iwerks was responsible for bringing them to life. However, Iwerks left the Disney studio in 1930 to form his own company, which was financially backed by Celebrity Pictures owner Pat Powers. After his departure, Disney eventually found a number of different animators to replace Iwerks.

Iwerks produced two cartoon series during the 1930s: Flip the Frog and Willie Whopper. However, none of these cartoons came close to matching the success of Disney or Fleischer cartoons and, in 1933, MGM, Iwerks' cartoon distributor since 1930, ended distribution of his cartoons, with Iwerks leaving after his contract expired in 1934.

==== Harman-Ising and the establishment of MGM Cartoons ====
After MGM dropped Iwerks, they hired Harman and Ising following their split from Leon Schlesinger and Warner Bros. Pictures and appointed them heads of the studio. They began producing Happy Harmonies cartoons, occasionally featuring Bosko, which were emulative of Disney's Silly Symphonies. Harman and Ising gained success with shorts such as The Calico Dragon (1935), The Old Mill Pond (1936, both nominated for Academy Awards) and To Spring (1936). But much like their time at Warner Bros., the duo experienced cost overruns on a regular basis. By 1937, MGM, in attempt to make cheaper cartoons, decided to fire the duo and establish a new in-house animation studio with Fred Quimby as producer.

With a new studio formed, Quimby kept a number of Harman and Ising's staff and scouted other animation studios for talent (including Warner director Friz Freleng and a bulk of animators from the Terrytoons studio). The first series he produced was an animated adaptation of the comic strip series The Captain and the Kids (which itself was a version of The Katzenjammer Kids, produced by that strip's original creator Rudolph Dirks but for a different syndicate). The Captain and The Kids series was unsuccessful. In 1939, however, Quimby gained success after rehiring Harman and Ising. After returning to MGM, Ising created MGM's first successful animated star named Barney Bear, who first appeared in The Bear That Couldn't Sleep (1939). Harman directed his masterpiece Peace on Earth (1939) in the meantime, and was also nominated for an Oscar.

==== Hanna-Barbera's Tom and Jerry ====
In 1939, William Hanna and Joseph Barbera started a partnership that lasted for more than six decades until Hanna's death in 2001. The duo's first cartoon together was Puss Gets the Boot (1940), featuring an unnamed mouse's attempts to outwit a house cat named Jasper. Though released without fanfare, the short was financially and critically successful, earning an Academy Award nomination for Best Short Subject (Cartoons) of 1940. On the strength of the Oscar nomination and public demand, Hanna and Barbera set themselves to producing a long-running series of cat-and-mouse cartoons, soon naming the characters Tom and Jerry. Puss Gets the Boot did not win the 1940 Academy Award for Best Cartoon, but another MGM cartoon, Rudolf Ising's The Milky Way (1940) did, making MGM the first studio to wrestle the Cartoon Academy Award away from Walt Disney. After appearing in Puss Gets the Boot, Tom and Jerry quickly became the stars of MGM cartoons. With Hanna-Barbera working for them, MGM was finally able to compete with Walt Disney in the field of animated cartoons. The shorts were successful at the box office, many licensed products (comic books, toys, etc.) were released to the market, and the series earned twelve more Academy Award for Short Subjects (Cartoons) nominations, with seven of the Tom and Jerry shorts going on to win the Academy Award: The Yankee Doodle Mouse (1943), Mouse Trouble (1944), Quiet Please! (1945), The Cat Concerto (1946), The Little Orphan (1948), The Two Mouseketeers (1951), and Johann Mouse (1952). Tom and Jerry was eventually tied with Disney's Silly Symphonies as the most-awarded theatrical cartoon series. No other character-based theatrical animated series has won more awards. In addition to the classic Tom and Jerry shorts, Hanna and Barbera also produced/directed six one-shot theatrical shorts besides it, including Gallopin' Gals (1940), Officer Pooch (1941), War Dogs (1943) and Good Will to Men (a remake of Peace on Earth, 1955).

Key to the successes of Tom and Jerry and other MGM cartoons was the work of Scott Bradley, who scored nearly all of the cartoons for the studio from 1934 to 1958. Bradley's scores made use of both classical and jazz sensibilities. In addition, he often used songs from the scores of MGM's feature films, the most frequent of them being "The Trolley Song" from Meet Me in St. Louis (1944) and "Sing Before Breakfast" from Broadway Melody of 1936 (1935).

==== Tex Avery's cartoons ====
Hugh Harman left for the final time in April 1941, prompting Quimby to search for a replacement. He hired Tex Avery in September, who at that point had left Warner Bros. after internal feuds with Leon Schlesinger. Avery revitalized their cartoon studio with the same spark that had infused the Warner animators. The wild surreal masterpieces of his MGM studio days set new standards for "adult" entertainment in Code-era cartoons, most famously exemplified in his series of shorts featuring Red Hot Riding Hood.

Tex Avery did not like to use recurring characters but did stay faithful to a character throughout his career at MGM with Droopy, who was created in Dumb-Hounded in 1943. Avery also created Screwy Squirrel the following year, a character known for his outrageously brash and erratic personality who torments his adversaries, but he grew less fond of him and discontinued the series after five cartoons. He also created the Of Mice and Men-inspired duo George and Junior in 1946, but only four cartoons were produced. In 1949, Avery would debut Butch (formerly named Spike) who would be a recurring antagonist in the Droopy films but also as a star in his own films such as Rock-a-Bye-Bear (1952) and Cellbound (1955) which was Avery's final cartoon for MGM. Avery's other notable films for MGM include Blitz Wolf (1942, also nominated), Northwest Hounded Police (1946), King-Size Canary (1947), The Cat That Hated People (1948), Bad Luck Blackie (1949), and Magical Maestro (1952).

Avery's influence was particularly felt within the studio, with Hanna and Barbera adapting his brand of humor and violence into their Tom & Jerry shorts. The only exception to this was Rudolf Ising, who was unable to adjust to Avery's style and instead continued to direct cartoons with more meticulous influences. He too left MGM in 1942 to work for the Army Air Force film unit as an animation supervisor.

==== Other developments and later years ====
After Ising left MGM, Hanna-Barbera animator George Gordon was promoted to director to take his place. He mainly directed a handful of Barney Bear shorts as well as a few other cartoons such as The Storks Holiday, and the short lived Ol' Doc Donkey series. Gordon's non Barney Bear shorts are often regarded as having a direction different to that of Hanna-Barbera and Tex Avery, often choosing to anthropomorphize inanimate objects in his shorts. Gordon was uncredited for most of the cartoons he directed, and he left the studio in 1943. Later in 1946, animators Michael Lah and Preston Blair were paired together to direct three more Barney Bear cartoons. Lah and Blair's three Barney cartoons were noted for having a direction more in tone to that of Hanna-Barbera and Tex Avery, but the series halted abruptly again when MGM closed Lah and Blair's unit in favor of releasing education films produced by John Sutherland Productions.

Later in 1950, Tex Avery left MGM to take a year's sabbatical. Ex-Disney/Lantz animator Dick Lundy was brought in to take his position during this period. He directed one Droopy cartoon, Caballero Droopy, as well as ten additional Barney Bear cartoons, in which Barney was voiced by Paul Frees. Avery returned in October 1951, with Lundy leaving soon after.

In 1953, Metro-Goldwyn-Mayer closed down Avery's unit. While Quimby did consider to re-open the unit later on, Avery and most of his animators soon moved to Walter Lantz Productions, while MGM later promoted Lah to director again to take Avery's place. Fred Quimby retired in 1955, with Hanna and Barbera replacing him as producers on the remaining MGM cartoons (including the last seven of Lah's Droopy cartoons) until 1957, when the studio closed entirely, ending all the animation productions. The duo founded their own studio, Hanna-Barbera, that year, bringing in most of the studio's staff in the process. The last cartoon from the MGM Cartoons unit, Tot Watchers, was released on August 1, 1958.

==== Rembrandt Films and MGM Animation/Visual Arts ====
By 1960, the high demand for more Tom and Jerry cartoons prompted MGM to search for another animation studio to produce the series, as Hanna and Barbera were now busy producing their own cartoons for television and Columbia Pictures. Through the help of MGM president Joe Vogel, the studio eventually signed a deal with the Czechoslovakia-based animation studio Rembrandt Films to produce 13 more Tom and Jerry shorts. Gene Deitch, an American animator who considered himself a "UPA man" and who generally disliked slapstick-based cartoons, directed the series, while William L. Snyder served as the producer. Unlike the in-house cartoons, Deitch had to work with a much smaller budget of $10,000 and overall limited resources. This resulted in his films having an odd surrealist nature, which Deitch did not intend. His Tom and Jerry shorts were noted for their jerky, occasionally praiseworthy animation, simplistic yet stylish backgrounds, and heavy use of reverberation in the soundtrack. Another aspect to this era was the addition of a new human owner for Tom who appeared in three of the 13 shorts; he is noted for being much more short-tempered and violent then any of Tom's previous owners.

Despite Deitch's shorts being commercially successful, many fans and critics considered them to be the worst of Tom and Jerry′s output up to that time. However, some fans appreciated Deitch's shorts for their quirkiness. After Vogel was fired, MGM decided not to renew their contract with Rembrandt. The last Rembrandt Tom and Jerry cartoon, Carmen Get It, was released on December 21, 1962.

Meanwhile, Chuck Jones started his own studio Sib Tower 12 Productions after he, and his unit of animators, were fired by Warner Bros. Cartoons for violating his exclusive contract by working on the UPA film Gay Purr-ee. Jones signed a contract with MGM in 1963 to produce an additional 34 Tom and Jerry shorts, all of which carried his distinct style and influence he strived for during his time at Warners. Jones's Tom and Jerry shorts were more reminiscent of his Wile E. Coyote and the Road Runner cartoons due to their use of blackout gags and specific jokes that can be found in the former shorts. MGM later purchased Jones's studio and renamed it MGM Animation/Visual Arts in 1964. Around this time Jones also directed a handful of one-shot cartoons for MGM such as 1965's The Dot and the Line and 1967's The Bear That Wasn't, the former of which won the 1965 Academy Award for Best Animated Short Film. Jones's shorts were better received and saw varying degrees of success, but MGM eventually decided to cease production of new Tom and Jerry shorts in 1967.

Jones's studio's other works included the 1966 TV adaptation of Dr. Seuss' How the Grinch Stole Christmas!, 1970's Horton Hears a Who! and the feature-length film The Phantom Tollbooth that same year. The studio eventually closed in late 1970, with Jones establishing another studio, Chuck Jones Enterprises, soon afterwards.

=== Columbia Pictures ===
==== Charles Mintz and Screen Gems ====
===== Initial Years and Color Rhapsodies =====
Columbia Pictures distributed Walt Disney Productions' films from 1930 to 1932. While Charles Mintz's West Coast branch had all defected to Disney, Harman-Ising or Universal, the East Coast studio producing Krazy Kat cartoons was unaffected; they switched distributors to Columbia Pictures after Paramount dropped them in favor of the Fleischers. After creating Toby the Pup for RKO Pictures, who later discontinued it in favor of Van Beuren Studios, he soon moved to create more shorts for Columbia. His most notable series was one featuring a boy named Scrappy, created by Dick Huemer in 1931. Although Scrappy was a big break for Mintz and was also his most successful creation, Huemer was fired from the Mintz Studio in 1933. In 1934, Mintz, like most other animation studios at the time, also responded to Disney's use of Technicolor and began making color cartoons through the Color Rhapsodies series; the series was originally in either Cinecolor or two-strip Technicolor, but moved to three-strip Technicolor after Disney's contract with Technicolor expired in 1935.

With the exception of Holiday Land (1934) and The Little Match Girl (1937), both of which were nominated for an Academy Award, the series failed to garner attention, and by 1939, Mintz was largely indebted to Columbia Pictures. As a result, Mintz sold his studio to Columbia. Columbia renamed the studio to Screen Gems, and Mintz died by the end of the year. Columbia also sub-contracted Ub Iwerks to produce cartoons from his own studio from 1937 until 1940.

===== Change of management and decline =====
Mintz's brother-in-law George Winkler briefly assumed the role of producer before he was succeeded by Frank Tashlin, who had initially worked as a storyman. Tashlin had significant influence on the studio as he hired a surplus of ex-Disney animators from the 1941 Disney animators' strike, and directed the short The Fox and the Grapes (1941), which unexpectedly created the studio's most popular characters, The Fox and the Crow. Around the same time, Columbia would layoff the majority of its Mintz-era animators to make way for the surplus of new artists.

Tashlin maintained his position until he was replaced by Ben Schwalb in 1942. He continued to act as the studio supervisor until he left abruptly in June, citing a feud with Columbia higher-ups. Tashlin and Schwalb were then replaced by Dave Fleischer, who was reportedly much more detached from his animators. He was later fired and replaced by a revolving door of producers. Critics and animation historians noted the quality of the studio's output had either stagnated or declined as Screen Gems was unable to rebound from its loss of Tashlin. It was argued that Columbia's mismanagement and its inability to find skillful writers and directors were key factors of the decline. Michael Barrier described their work at the time as "imitation Warner Bros."

The other recurring characters Columbia developed at this time included Willoughby Wren, Flippy and Flop, Igor Puzzlewitz, Professor Small and Mr. Tall, Tito and his Burrito, and an adaptation of Al Capp's Li'l Abner, with which Capp was not pleased due to its oversimplification of his characters. Columbia remained dissatisfied with the studio's output and eventually closed it in 1946, with a back catalog that lasted until 1949. The Screen Gems name was reused for a television subsidiary the same year.

==== United Productions of America ====
===== Early productions =====
John Hubley was one of many ex-Disney staffers who were hired by Tashlin to work at the Screen Gems studio, initially working as a writer and later a director with Paul Sommer. While Hubley later admitted to disliking his work for Screen Gems, he had much creative freedom due to Dave Fleischer's detachment from the employees. The cartoons Hubley and Sommer directed were noted for their greater use of human characters, minimalistic backgrounds and abstract character designs. Much of it was inspired by limited animation techniques Chuck Jones had established for his cartoon The Dover Boys, with Hubley and Sommer even going as far as directing a "clone" with the cartoon The Rocky Road to Ruin.

Hubley left Screen Gems in 1943 after he was enlisted in the United States Armed Forces. At the same time, he helped to establish a new studio with former Disney animators Stephen Bosustow, Zack Schwartz and David Hilberman, who—like Hubley—had left Disney's company during the animators' strike. It was a newer, smaller animation studio that focused on pursuing Hubley's own vision of trying out newer, more abstract and experimental styles of animation. Bosustow, Hilberman, and Schwartz named the new studio Industrial Film and Poster Service (IFPS). Artistically, the studio also used limited animation as its main art style. The first short from the newly formed studio was Sparks and Chips Get the Blitz (1943). Their second short was Hell-Bent for Election (1944), a cartoon made for the re-election campaign of Franklin D. Roosevelt. Although these new films were a success, it did not break the boundaries that Hubley and his staffers had hoped. It wasn't until the third short, Robert Cannon's Brotherhood of Man, that the studio began producing shorts aggressively stylized in contrast to the films of the other studios. Cannon's film even preached a message that was looked down upon—racial tolerance. By 1946, the studio was renamed United Productions of America (UPA), and Hilberman and Schwartz had sold their shares of the studio stock to Bosustow.

===== Success under Columbia =====
In 1948, UPA also found a home for itself at Columbia Pictures and began producing theatrical cartoons for the general public, instead of just using propaganda and military training themes; UPA also earned itself two Academy Award nominations for new cartoons starring The Fox and the Crow during its first two years in production. Unlike with Screen Gems, Columbia was much more hands-off in terms of management. From there, the UPA animators began producing a series of cartoons that immediately stood out among the crowded field of mirror-image, copycat cartoons of the other studios. The success of UPA's Mr. Magoo series made the other studios take notice, and when the UPA short Gerald McBoing-Boing (1950) won an Oscar, the effect on Hollywood was immediate and electrifying. The UPA style was markedly different from everything else on movie screens, and audiences responded to the change that UPA offered from the repetition of the usual cat and mouse battles. Mr. Magoo became the studio's most successful cartoon character.

By 1953, UPA had gained great influence within the industry. The Hollywood cartoon studios gradually moved away from the lush, realistic detail of the 1940s to a more simplistic, less realistic style of animation. By this time, even Disney was attempting to mimic UPA. Disney's 1953 shorts Melody and Toot, Whistle, Plunk and Boom in particular were experiments in stylization that followed in the footsteps of the newly formed studio. However, UPA suffered a major blow after John Hubley was fired from the studio during the McCarthy Era in 1952, due to suspicions of him having ties to Communism; Steve Bosustow took over, but was not as successful as Hubley, and the studio was eventually sold to Henry Saperstein in 1960.

===== Feature-length films and decline =====
In 1959, UPA released 1001 Arabian Nights starring Mr. Magoo; however, this was a failure and cost UPA their distribution deal with Columbia Pictures. They tried once more in 1962, when UPA released Gay Purr-ee with the voice talent of Judy Garland, this time distributed by Warner Bros. While the film was well received, it too was a financial failure. In 1964, UPA decided to abandon animation and simply become a distribution company, going on to distribute some of the Godzilla movies in America.

==== Hanna-Barbera ====
Prior to UPA's termination, Columbia struck a ten-year distribution deal with Hanna-Barbera, which had just left the freshly shut down Metro-Goldwyn-Mayer Cartoon Studio. This deal was mostly involved with Columbia's television division, Screen Gems, which ironically had borrowed the name from the animation studio. In 1959, Hanna-Barbera began producing its only theatrical series for Columbia, Loopy De Loop. This series was a success and ran until 1965. Hanna-Barbera also produced two feature-length movies for Columbia, Hey There, It's Yogi Bear! and The Man Called Flintstone. Columbia's ten-year contract with Hanna-Barbera expired in 1967 and was not renewed, thus ending Columbia's association with Hanna-Barbera.

=== Universal Pictures/Walter Lantz Productions ===
==== Early developments ====
In 1928, Walter Lantz replaced Charles Mintz as producer of Universal Studios cartoons. Walter Lantz's main character at this time was Oswald the Lucky Rabbit, whose earlier cartoons had been produced by both Walt Disney and Mintz. Lantz also started to experiment with color cartoons, and the first one, called Jolly Little Elves, was released in 1934. In 1935, Walter Lantz made his studio independent from Universal Studios, and the studio was now only the distributor of his cartoons, instead of the direct owner. After seeing Disney's success with their first feature film Snow White and the Seven Dwarfs, Lantz planned to produce a full-length animated film based on the Aladdin story, starring Abbott and Costello. However, the project was not developed after Mr. Bug Goes to Town failed at the box office.

==== New stars and United Artists ====
By the late 30s, Oswald began to lose popularity. Lantz and his staff worked on several ideas for possible new cartoon characters (among them Meany, Miny, and Moe, Lil' Eightball, and Baby-Face Mouse). The studio eventually settled on Andy Panda, who gained popularity starting with his debut short, Life Begins for Andy Panda (1939). However successful Andy was, the character's fifth cartoon, Knock Knock (1940), marked the debut of a real breakthrough character: Woody Woodpecker, who became Lantz's most successful creation.

By the early 1940s, Lantz and animator Alex Lovy directed cartoons through the use of a singular unit until 1943, when James Culhane (an ex-Disney/Fleischer animator who recently had a brief stint at Warner Bros.) took their roles as director, starting with the cartoon Pass the Biscuits Mirandy! (1943). Culhane's tenure at Lantz was noted for introducing Russian avant-garde-influenced experimentation, minimalist backgrounds and fast cutting, which helped his shorts stand out from the studio's previous work. Lantz also introduced a new film series under the name Swing Symphony, which consisted of musical shorts based on contemporary swing music. Culhane later left Lantz in late-1945 following a pay dispute. Ex-Disney animator Dick Lundy assumed the role as director after Culhane's departure. Unlike Culhane, Lundy focused much more on sight gags and the animation. Critics noted the animation's jump in quality in the late 1940s, mainly due to Lundy's influence as well as the arrival of more ex-Disney animators, such as Ed Love, Fred Moore, and Ken O'Brien.

In 1947, Lantz was negotiating with Universal about his seven-year contract when a merger caused the studio to be reorganized as Universal-International. Universal-International's new management insisted on keeping the merchandising and licensing rights of Lantz's characters. Lantz refused and instead withdrew his cartoons from Universal-International and arranged to have them distributed by United Artists between 1947 and 1949. This was also the era where Andy Panda cartoons were officially discontinued due to the character's waning popularity. In total, Lantz released 12 shorts through United Artists.

==== Restructuring and later years ====
Lantz's studio went through severe financial problems during its time with United Artists, which caused him to close the studio in 1949. It opened again in 1950 with a smaller staff, mainly because Lantz was able to recover from his losses and signed a deal with Universal-International for more Woody Woodpecker cartoons, starting with Puny Express (1951). Woody continued to appear until the early 1970s. Lantz served as the sole director and writer for his own cartoons for two years before those jobs were assumed by animator Don Patterson and writer Homer Brightman. With MGM reducing its animation studio and Warner Bros. briefly closing its entire animation department in the 1950s, Lantz was able to acquire enough staff to establish a second unit. Paul J. Smith, a Warner Bros. veteran who worked for Lantz in the 1940s, was the director for this new unit.

In 1953, Smith created Chilly Willy, who became another prominent character for the Lantz studio. He was refined by Tex Avery (who had left MGM earlier that decade) in the following year. Avery directed four shorts during his time at Walter Lantz Productions, until he left in 1955 over pay disputes. Additional directorial contributions came from Jack Hannah, Sid Marcus, and Alex Lovy, who returned to the studio in the mid 1950s. The Lantz studio also created several more recurring characters in this era, such as Maw and Paw, Maggie & Sam, Windy & Breezy, Inspector Willoughby, Hickory, Dickory, and Doc, and The Beary Family.

Lantz closed his studio's doors for the final time in 1972, saying that continuing to produce shorts would be impossible due to rising production costs. However, Woody Woodpecker remained in the public eye, as The Woody Woodpecker Show, featuring Lantz cartoons starring Woody and other characters, had debuted on television in the 1957-1958 season. Additional seasons were produced from 1963 to 1964, from 1970 to 1971, and from 1976 to 1977, with the show airing in syndication well into the 1990s. Lantz sold all of the Woody Woodpecker shorts to Universal, then part of MCA.

=== Terrytoons ===
==== Pre-Terrytoons era ====
Before Paul Terry created his own studio, he was employed by Bray Productions in 1916, where he created his recognizable character, Farmer Al Falfa. In 1921, he worked at Fables Pictures, Inc, founded by Keith-Albee-Orpheum and soon purchased by Amedee J. Van Beuren in 1928. There, he worked on the Aesop's Film Fables cartoon series. Van Beuren however became anxious due to the phenomenon of a new film format of pre-synchronized sound in film. Beuren urged Terry to produce films in this format, but he refused, forcing him to fire Terry in 1929.

==== Formation and financial backing ====
After losing his Aesop's Film Fables series to Van Beuren Studios in 1929, Terry established a new studio called Terrytoons. The studio produced 26 cartoons a year for E.W. Hammons' Educational Pictures, which in turn supplied short-subject products to the Fox Film Corporation. When Fox Film was later reformed into 20th Century Fox in 1935, the studio withdrew support from Educational Pictures and financially backed Terry's studio instead. Educational Pictures folded in the late 1930s. Terry's cartoons of the thirties were mainly produced in black and white and had very few recurring characters, with the exception of Farmer Al Falfa, who had appeared in Terry's cartoons since the silent era.

The 1930s and 1940s brought Terry's most popular and successful characters, Gandy Goose beginning in 1938, Mighty Mouse beginning in 1942, and Heckle and Jeckle, a team developed by combining what was originally a husband-and-wife pair of mischievous magpies from the 1946 Farmer Al Falfa cartoon The Talking Magpies with Terry's notion that twin brothers or look-alikes had comedic possibilities. Other characters included Dinky Duck in 1939, Dimwit the Dog (originally paired with Heckle and Jeckle), and Sourpuss (usually paired with Gandy Goose). Under Terry's ownership, Terrytoons was nominated three times for the Academy Award for Best Animated Short Film, for All Out for V (1942), My Boy, Johnny (1944), and Mighty Mouse in Gypsy Life (1945).

Despite its success, the Terrytoons cartoons were known for having the smallest budgets of any major animation studio at the time, as well as being the slowest to adapt to new animation standards. Paul Terry mainly produced cartoons from a business point of view rather than their artistic value; he said, "Let Walt Disney be the Tiffany's of the business. I want to be the Woolworth's!" However, Terrytoons is considered to have been an early stepping stone for several prominent animators, such as Joseph Barbera and Art Babbitt.

==== The CBS era ====
Terry retired after selling his company and its backlog to CBS in 1956. CBS continued to operate the studio for the rest of its lifetime, with Gene Deitch now in charge as creative director. Terrytoons underwent significant changes under Deitch's leadership. Unlike Terry, Deitch wanted to divert the studio from its strict contemporary format and instead produce cartoons in a more minimalist style, similar to UPA. Terrytoons was also divided between producing theatrical shorts and cartoons for television, as well as having new characters such as Tom Terrific, Lariat Sam, Sidney the Elephant, Gaston Le Crayon, John Doormat, and Clint Clobber. Deitch discontinued the Mighty Mouse and Heckle and Jeckle cartoons so that focus could be put more on his new characters. The Sidney cartoon, Sidney's Family Tree (1958), earned Terrytoons another Academy Award nomination.

Deitch was fired in 1959 by executive producer William M. Weiss, who reverted a few of Deitch's decisions. Mighty Mouse and Heckle and Jeckle returned to production for some time, alongside the creation of new characters, such as Hector Heathcote, Luno the White Stallion, Hashimoto-san, Sad Cat and Deputy Dawg. Animator Ralph Bakshi also gained prominence, originally starting out as an opaquer (who paints opaque colors on areas drawn on animators' cels by inkers) and later a director. Bakshi later moved to Famous Studios in 1967. Terrytoons continued operations until the studio declined and closed in 1972.

== Other notable studios ==
=== The Van Beuren Corporation ===
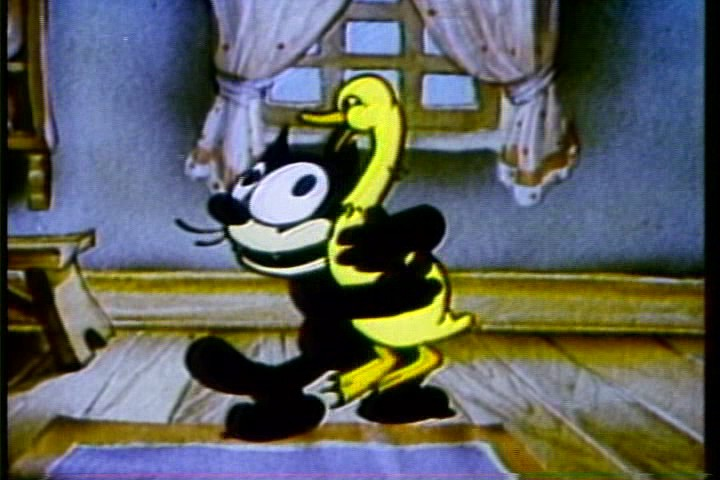
Felix the Cat in The Goose That Laid the Golden Egg (1936) by Van Beuren

In 1928, producer Amadee J. Van Beuren bought Keith-Albee-Orpheum's Fables Pictures Studio and formed a partnership with Paul Terry for the production of the Aesop's Film Fables cartoon series. In 1929, Terry left to start his own studio and was replaced by John Foster who took over the animation department, and renamed the studio Van Beuren Studios. Van Beuren continued the Aesop's Fables series, created new characters such as Cubby Bear, and unsuccessfully tried a cartoon adaptation of radio blackface comedians Amos 'n Andy. Other Van Beuren cartoons featured Tom and Jerry (not the cat and mouse, but a Mutt and Jeff-like human duo) and Otto Soglow's comic strip character The Little King. Frank Tashlin and Joseph Barbera were among animators who worked briefly for the studio during its short life. Van Beuren also sub-contracted Harman-Ising Productions to produce a handful of Cubby Bear cartoons before Harman-Ising contracted with MGM in 1934.

That same year, as other studios were making animated cartoons in Technicolor in response to Disney's Silly Symphonies cartoon series, Van Beuren Studio abandoned its remaining cartoons and created the Rainbow Parade series, which was all color. However, the series was not a success, and by 1936, RKO Pictures, the distributor of Van Beuren's cartoons, ended their contract with them to distribute Disney's cartoons instead. Van Beuren closed the studio in 1938 and died soon afterwards. Most of its staff either moved to Terrytoons, Fleischer Studios, or other studios in the East or West Coast.

Van Beuren Studios and Fleischer Studios were cited as causing the formation of the Screen Cartoonist's Guild in 1938, with the former studio being noted for its poor treatment of union workers by either Van Beuren himself or director Burt Gillett. Van Beuren has said to have closed his studio as he refused to accept unionization within his business.

=== Animated Pictures/Cartoon Films Ltd. ===
In 1930, distributor Pat Powers convinced Walt Disney animator Ub Iwerks to leave the Disney studio and create his own, believing that Iwerks was responsible for much of Disney's early success. Iwerks opened his studio Animated Pictures that year with Powers as his financial backer. Animated Pictures first made cartoons for Metro-Goldwyn-Mayer, creating characters such as Flip the Frog and Willie Whopper. MGM later ended distributing his cartoons in favor of releasing Harman-Ising's cartoons.

After his stay with MGM, Iwerks' cartoons were distributed by Celebrity Pictures, and Iwerks responded to Disney's use of Technicolor by creating the ComiColor Cartoon series, films made in two-strip Cinecolor. However, by 1936, Animated Pictures began to experience financial setbacks after Powers withdrew financial aid. After animating at Warner Bros. Pictures, creating Gabby Goat and subcontracting cartoons for Columbia Pictures for some time, Iwerks returned to Disney in 1940, where he worked as the head of the special effects development division until his death in 1971.

Iwerks left behind his animation studio following his return to Disney. It was soon reorganized as Cartoon Films Ltd., with British-based angel investor Lawson Harris becoming the studio producer and Paul Fennell the director. The studio's main output was commercial animation, but it was most known for its specialties for Columbia. One short-lived series, The Changing World, starring journalist Raymond Gram Swing, was planned to have six shorts produced documenting events before and during World War II, but was scrapped after two shorts. Another short entitled The Carpenters (1941) was produced and featured the antics of Mr. Teewilliger and his bumbling employees Clancy and Herman. The studio continued to produce animated commercials following their work with Columbia.

=== Republic Pictures ===
Following his termination from Screen Gems, Dave Fleischer approached Republic Pictures with an elf-like character named Snippy, who first appeared in the 1944 film Trocadero. He also produced a lengthy animated sequence in That's My Baby! that same year. Later in 1946, Republic incorporated a piece of animation by Walter Lantz Productions into its film Sioux City, a western starring Gene Autry. The next year, Republic signed a deal with ex-Warner director Bob Clampett to produce a series of shorts starring his latest creation, Charlie Horse. Clampett directed one cartoon entitled It's a Grand Old Nag (1947) before the company cancelled a potential animated series.

Later in 1949, Republic started another cartoon series called Jerky Journeys, led by radio comedy writer Leonard L. Levinson. The cartoons were noted for using limited animation, and were described as satirical travelogue films with small budgets. Art Heinemann was the lead layout designer, Miles Pike provided the special effects and Warner artists Robert Gribbroek, Peter Alvarado and Paul Julian provided the background paintings.

=== George Pal Productions ===
George Pal was a Hungarian filmmaker who originally produced traditionally animated and puppetry shorts in Europe during the 1930s. Unlike other films that feature puppetry, Pal's puppet shorts used a stop motion technique known as "replacement animation" (or the Pal-Doll technique), which uses a series of unique carved wooden puppets for each frame to emulate movement rather than using a single puppet. Some of Pal's earlier shorts were advertisements for specific products, such as the Philips Radio system in The Ship of the Ether (1934), Philips Cavalcade (1934) and The Sleeping Beauty (1939). Pal moved to the United States in 1939 and was contracted by Paramount to produce more stop-motion shorts under the name Madcap Models, later rebranded as Puppetoons.

Seven Puppetoon films from 1941 to 1947 were nominated for the Academy Award for Best Animated Short Film, and the series created several recurring characters, such as Jasper, Mr. Strauss, and Punchy & Judy, as well as producing industrial animation for the Shell Oil Company. Due to his European origin, Pal refrained from using overtly negative depictions of African Americans in his films. He also produced shorts that commemorated African American culture, such as the shorts John Henry and the Inky-Poo (1946) and Dates with Duke (1947).

By 1947, production costs had inflated to nearly $50,000 per short, a price to which Paramount objected. Paramount suggested that Pal should shift his focus from stop-motion to live action films, which he did, effectively ending the Puppetoons series. He still incorporated stop-motion sequences in his films, such as in The Great Rupert (1949), Tom Thumb (1958), and The Wonderful World of the Brothers Grimm (1963). Pal's 1950 film Destination Moon also notably incorporated a traditionally animated sequence by Walter Lantz Productions, featuring Woody Woodpecker. The sequence was produced immediately after Lantz, a close friend of Pal's, reopened his studio that same year.

=== John Sutherland Productions ===
John Sutherland founded his own studio John Sutherland Productions in 1945 after working in Walt Disney Productions and the US Army with a series of World War II training films. The studio was mainly known for producing educational and instruction-based animation granted by the Harding College with the help of Alfred P. Sloan. One of their more notable films is Make Mine Freedom, a 1948 cartoon that was the first in a series of pro-free enterprise films produced by the studio. Sutherland was able to hire prominent artists in the industry such as Emery Hawkins, Phil Roman and a large bulk of ex-Harman-Ising animators to work on his cartoons. Sutherland's studio was able to develop a relationship with MGM, who distributed some of their shorts in the late 1940s and early 50s. Sutherland also dabbled in stop-motion animation, such as producing the Daffy Ditty shorts with Larry Morey for United Artists. He produced 45 films from 1945 until his retirement in 1973.

=== Jerry Fairbanks Productions ===
While not mainly involved in animation, Jerry Fairbanks did work on several projects in the medium. In 1941, Fairbanks produced the successful Speaking of Animals short films, based on an idea conceptualized by Tex Avery at Warner Bros., and was nominated twice for an Academy Award for Best Live Action Short Film. In the late 1940s and early 50s, Fairbanks also produced industrial films with occasional animated sequences by Manny Gould, Lou Lilly and Anna Osborn. Fairbanks also worked on Crusader Rabbit as a supervising producer.

=== Jay Ward Productions ===
Founded in 1948 by animator Jay Ward, Jay Ward Productions aired the first cartoon made for television, Crusader Rabbit, and is also remembered for The Adventures of Rocky and Bullwinkle and Friends (1959–1964), as well as several iconic advertisements, such as those for breakfast cereals. Employing a limited animation style, the success of Jay Ward cartoons laid in their densely packed visual gags and wordplay.

=== The Jam Handy Organization ===
Jam Handy, an Olympic swimmer and water polo player, was known for founding his own Chicago-based studio, The Jam Handy Organization, after working as an industrial representative for Bray Productions. Though he is best known for producing films for the auto industry, Handy also dabbled in animation. He made numerous animated shorts featuring Nicky Nome, a character made to advertise the Chevrolet for General Motors.

Perhaps Handy's best known animated short was the 1948 adaptation of Rudolph the Red-Nosed Reindeer, sponsored by Montgomery Ward. It was the first known animated adaptation of Rudolph and was produced and directed by Max Fleischer.

=== McCrory Studios Inc. ===
In 1926, John Robert McCrory, an author and World War I soldier turned animator, formed his own animation studio based in New York after gaining experience from Bray Productions and Walt Disney's Laugh-O-Gram Studio. He reached a deal with Life magazine to produce a series of shorts featuring his character Mike the Monk, a humanoid monkey character accompanied by his girlfriend. Mike spun off into another series entitled Krazy Kids, which lasted about a year.

Later in 1930, Leon Schlesinger was offering a contract for an animation studio to produce the Looney Tunes series. While animators Hugh Harman and Rudolf Ising pitched a series based on their character Bosko, McCrory attempted to win the offer by hastily producing a cartoon featuring his newest character Buster Bear, which was originally produced as two or four separate cartoons. In the end, Schlesinger signed Harman and Ising to produce the series, as McCrory's cartoon was not up to standard, as well as the rumor of McCrory brutalizing his staff if deadlines weren't met. McCrory did not quit the industry, as he later created a short-lived series based on Little Orphan Annie, Buck Rogers and Dick Tracy, as well as gaining success by redistributing his Buster Bear and Annie cartoons through toy projectors and home media. In 1938, the studio was rebranded as Knowledge Builders and continued operations into the 1960s.

=== Ted Eshbaugh Studios ===
Ted Eshbaugh, an American animator/filmmaker, initially created a Los Angeles-based animation studio in the early 1930s after experimenting with early forms of color processing for cartoons in the late 20s. His studio was an early producer of color animation, with shorts such as Goofy Goat (1931, which used Multicolor) and The Snowman (1933, which used Technicolor). Eshbaugh also produced an adaptation of L. Frank Baum's The Wonderful Wizard of Oz, which was also planned to be a full series. The film was not released due to Technicolor signing an exclusivity deal with Disney around the same time, and Baum's son, Frank Joslyn Baum, rejecting its release due to missed deadlines.

Eshbaugh later worked at the Van Beuren Studio until 1935, when he founded another studio based in New York. One of the first productions was a satirical cartoon based on Franklin D. Roosevelt's New Deal entitled A Fable of the New Deal, which was made as part of a political campaign to satirize Roosevelt's 1936 presidential campaign. It was reportedly censored after initial screenings when its sponsor, Sentinels of the Republic, found the caricatures representing Roosevelt to be too grotesque. Other early projects included a color series featuring a character named Peter Panda and a short made for Planters Nut & Chocolate Co. entitled Mr. Peanut and His Family Tree for their 1939 World's Fair exhibit. Eshbaugh also made a few shorts promoting the war effort during World War II, such as Sammy Salvage (1943) and Cap'n Cub (1945). Eshbaugh's studio continued operations into the late 1950s.

== Trends ==
=== Sound in animation ===
While much of the focus in an animated cartoon is on the visuals, the vocal talents and symphonic scores that accompanied the images were also very important to the animated cartoons' success. As motion pictures drew audiences away from their radio sets, it also drew talented actors and vocal impressionists into film and animation. Mel Blanc gave voice to most of Warner Bros.' more popular characters, including Bugs Bunny, Porky Pig (starting in 1937), and Daffy Duck. Other voices and personalities from vaudeville and radio contributed to the popularity of animated films in the Golden Era. Some of these (generally uncredited) actors included Cliff Edwards (also known as Ukulele Ike), Arthur Q. Bryan, Stan Freberg, Bea Benaderet, Bill Thompson, Grace Stafford, Jim Backus, June Foray, and Daws Butler.

Cartoons of this era also included scores played by studio orchestras. Carl Stalling, Scott Bradley, Sammy Timberg, Winston Sharples, Darrell Calker, Clarence Wheeler, and Oliver Wallace composed numerous cartoon soundtracks, creating original material as well as incorporating familiar classical and popular melodies. Many of the early cartoons, particularly those of Disney's Silly Symphonies series, were built around classical pieces. These cartoons sometimes featured star characters, but many had simple nature themes.

=== Stop motion and special effects ===
For a great part of the history of Hollywood animation, the production of animated films was an exclusive industry that did not branch off very often into other areas. The various animation studios worked almost exclusively on producing animated cartoons and animated titles for movies. Only occasionally was animation used for other aspects of the movie industry. The low-budget Superman serials of the 1940s used animated sequences of Superman flying and performing super-powered feats which were used in the place of live-action special effects, but this was not a common practice.

The exclusivity of animation also resulted in the birth of a sister industry that was used almost exclusively for motion picture special effects: stop motion animation. In spite of their similarities, the two genres of stop-motion and hand-drawn animation rarely came together during the Golden Age of Hollywood. Stop-motion animation made a name for itself with the 1933 box-office hit King Kong, in which animator Willis O'Brien defined many of the major stop motion techniques used for the next 50 years. The success of King Kong led to a number of other early special effects films, including Mighty Joe Young, which was also animated by O'Brien and helped to start the careers of several animators, including Ray Harryhausen, who came into his own in the 1950s. George Pal was the only stop-motion animator to produce a series of stop-motion animated cartoons for theatrical release, the Puppetoon series for Paramount, some of which were animated by Ray Harryhausen. Pal went on to produce several live-action special effects-laden feature films.

Stop motion animation reached the height of its popularity during the 1950s. The exploding popularity of science fiction films led to an exponential development in the field of special effects, and George Pal became the producer of several popular special effects-laden films. Meanwhile, Ray Harryhausen's work on such films as The Beast from 20,000 Fathoms, Earth vs. the Flying Saucers, and The Seventh Voyage of Sinbad drew in large crowds and encouraged the development of "realistic" special effects in films. These effects used many of the same techniques as cel animation, but still the two media did not often come together. Stop motion developed to the point that the effects in Fantastic Voyage and 2001: A Space Odyssey seemed lifelike to an unearthly degree.

Hollywood special effects continued to develop in a manner that largely avoided cel animation, though several memorable animated sequences were included in live-action feature films of the era. The most famous of these was a scene during the movie Anchors Aweigh, in which actor Gene Kelly danced with an animated Jerry Mouse (of Tom and Jerry fame). But except for occasional sequences of this sort, the only real integration of cel animation into live-action films came in the development of animated credit and title sequences. Saul Bass's opening sequences for Alfred Hitchcock's films (including Vertigo, North by Northwest, and Psycho) are highly praised, and inspired several imitators.

=== The wartime era ===
The major Hollywood studios contributed greatly to the war effort, and their cartoon studios pitched in as well with various contributions. At the Fleischer studios, Popeye the Sailor joined the Navy and began fighting Nazis, Italian Fascists, and "Japs"; while the Warner Bros. studio produced a series of Private Snafu instructional film cartoons especially for viewing by enlisted soldiers. Even Disney was involved in the war effort, producing both satirical comedies such as Der Fuhrer's Face and commentaries such as Education for Death.

== Decline of theatrical shorts ==
=== DePatie–Freleng Enterprises ===
The 1960s saw some creative sparks in the theatrical film medium, in particular from DePatie–Freleng Enterprises. Their first and most successful project was animating the opening titles for the 1964 film, The Pink Panther, starring Peter Sellers. The film and its animated sequences were so successful that United Artists commissioned the studio to produce a cartoon series featuring the title character. The first short, The Pink Phink, won the Academy Award for Best Animated Short Film of 1964. The studio also produced other successful cartoon series such as The Inspector and The Ant and the Aardvark.

From 1964 to 1967, DePatie–Freleng produced Looney Tunes and Merrie Melodies shorts under contract with Warner Bros. These cartoons can be recognized easily because they use the modern abstract WB logos instead of the famous bullseye WB shield concentric circles. The studio also subcontracted eleven Wile E. Coyote and the Road Runner cartoons to Format Films. DePatie–Freleng ceased production of Looney Tunes (leaving Warner Bros. to produce its own cartoons, which it did from 1967 to 1969) and moved to the San Fernando Valley in 1967 to continue production of their Pink Panther cartoons, producing the final original theatrical cartoon in 1977. The subsequent Pink Panther shorts released between 1978 and 1981 were originally produced for television and then released into theaters. In 1981, DePatie–Freleng Enterprises was purchased by Marvel Comics and renamed Marvel Productions.

=== Hanna-Barbera ===
In 1946, the animation union of the time negotiated a pay increase of 25%, making cartoons more expensive to produce on a general basis. After the 1948 verdict following the Hollywood antitrust case, studios could not guarantee that their cartoons would be booked into theaters, making animation a more risky business. Because of this, less resources were invested in the theatrical shorts, causing a gradual decline. By the beginning of the 1950s, the medium of television was beginning to gain more momentum, and the animation industry began to change as a result. At the head of this change were the tandem of William Hanna and Joseph Barbera, the creators of Tom and Jerry. The new Hanna-Barbera utilized the limited animation style that UPA had pioneered. With this limited animation, Hanna and Barbera created several characters including Huckleberry Hound, The Flintstones, Yogi Bear, Top Cat and The Jetsons. With television's growing popularity, which included the Saturday morning cartoons, a much more significant decline began in moviegoing in the 1960s. To face the competition from television, theaters did what they could to reduce their own costs. One way of doing so was booking features only and avoiding the expenses of shorts, which were considered unnecessary. Those few shorts that found their way to the theaters despite this are often viewed by critics as inferior to their predecessors.

=== MGM Animation/Visual Arts ===
Meanwhile, Chuck Jones, who had been fired from Warner Bros., moved to MGM to produce thirty-four theatrical Tom and Jerry cartoons in late 1963. These cartoons were animated in his distinctive style, but they never quite matched the popularity of the Hanna-Barbera originals of the 1940s and 1950s heyday. However, they were more successful than the Gene Deitch Tom and Jerry shorts, which were produced in Prague, Czechoslovakia, during 1961 and 1962.

== Timeline ==
This is a timeline of golden age of American animation studios' active production of regularly released animated cartoon shorts for theatrical exhibition. Some studios continue to release animated shorts to theaters on an infrequent basis. The colors correspond to the animation studio's associated theatrical distributor.

== Legacy ==
Among the films from this era, seven animated features from Disney (Snow White and the Seven Dwarfs, Pinocchio, Fantasia, Dumbo, Bambi, Cinderella, Lady and the Tramp, and Sleeping Beauty) and several animated cartoon shorts (Steamboat Willie, Betty Boop's version of Snow White, Three Little Pigs, Popeye Meets Sinbad the Sailor, Porky in Wackyland, Gerald McBoing Boing, The Tell-Tale Heart, Duck Amuck, and What's Opera Doc?) have been inducted into the National Film Registry. The aforementioned shorts were also part of animation historian's Jerry Beck's 1994 book survey of The 50 Greatest Cartoons.

=== Depictions in the modern popular culture ===
The 1988 live-action animated feature film Who Framed Roger Rabbit honored both the golden age of American animation and the classical Hollywood cinema. The film featured cameos of popular cartoon characters from various studios such as Walt Disney, Warner Bros., Fleischer Studios, MGM, Walter Lantz, and Terrytoons. The film marked the only time that Walt Disney Studios' Mickey Mouse and Donald Duck cross over with Warner Bros. Studios' Bugs Bunny and Daffy Duck, respectively, on screen. The golden age of American animation also influenced certain animated television shows such as Animaniacs, Tiny Toon Adventures, Pinky and the Brain, Taz-Mania, The Sylvester & Tweety Mysteries, Duck Dodgers, and The Ren & Stimpy Show (influenced by classic Warner Bros. cartoons and classic MGM cartoons), the animated series of Batman and Superman (influenced by classic Superman animated cartoons), and Mickey Mouse Works and House of Mouse (influenced by Walt Disney cartoons).

Likewise, Fleischer's aesthetic of the animated Superman series influenced the futuristic designs of Batman Beyond and The Spectacular Spider-Man, while the Chuck Jones, Maurice Noble, Hanna-Barbera and UPA aesthetics influenced the retro designs of Disney's Kim Possible. Other television productions influenced by classic theatrical animation include most of the animated series in The Disney Afternoon programming block (Adventures of the Gummi Bears, DuckTales, Chip 'n Dale: Rescue Rangers, TaleSpin, Darkwing Duck, Goof Troop, Bonkers, Gargoyles, Timon & Pumbaa, and Quack Pack). Ray Harryhausen's stop-motion animation served as inspiration for the production of Jurassic Park and The Nightmare Before Christmas. Several animated films by Don Bluth, such as Rock-a-Doodle and The Pebble and the Penguin, are recognized as some of the last productions to use traditional cels for their designs during the rise of computer animation.

Most of the Disney Renaissance movies and the feature film The Princess and the Frog were made with similar animation techniques to those of the golden age. In addition, the 1999 feature film Fantasia 2000 is a direct sequel to the original 1940 feature film Fantasia. Furthermore, CGI feature films like Cars, Tangled, Frozen, Zootopia, Puss in Boots: The Last Wish, and The Wild Robot, were also inspired by classic animated works. Disney's 1973 feature film Robin Hood was produced using recycled animation and designs from earlier Walt Disney films, while the short film Mickey's Christmas Carol (1983) was recognized for the return of classic Disney characters to theatrical animation. In fact, the golden age has also influenced other animated short films, such as Paperman, Get a Horse!, Prise de Bec, The Brave Locomotive, the animated segments of the 1977 musical film Pete's Dragon, and the Pudgy and Grunge cartoon segment of Mrs. Doubtfire. Though only one minute of the cartoon is shown during the film, Jones and his team animated five minutes of footage. Likewise, the first Winnie the Pooh animated shorts were combined with a new one in the feature film The Many Adventures of Winnie the Pooh, with Disney's version of Winnie the Pooh becoming a popular franchise.

Other animated feature films such as The Rescuers, The Brave Little Toaster, Oliver & Company, The Land Before Time, All Dogs Go to Heaven, The Nutcracker Prince, Thumbelina, The Swan Princess, Balto, Cats Don't Dance, Anastasia, The King and I, The Iron Giant, and Brother Bear, were also influenced by the aesthetics in the animations of the golden age. This trend of making animations with classic designs was very relevant during the renaissance age of American animation, a period in which the nostalgia market was particularly strong among the audience, starting with The Great Mouse Detective and An American Tail. On the other hand, The Fox and the Hound was the last animated film in which Disney veterans participated as a group. Animated movies like Titan A.E., Atlantis: The Lost Empire, and Lilo & Stitch experimented with combining science fiction with classic animated styles, while Tom Sawyer, The Emperor's New Groove, and Home on the Range experimented with classic comedy styles. Due to the rise in popularity of the classic characters in the 1980s and 1990s, Disney produced the animated short films Sport Goofy in Soccermania, The Prince and the Pauper, and Runaway Brain. Later, children's programs were also developed such as The Flintstone Kids, Tom & Jerry Kids, Baby Looney Tunes, Mickey Mouse Clubhouse, and Mickey Mouse Funhouse. Likewise, Mickey, Donald, Goofy: The Three Musketeers was an attempt to recover classic Disney characters at the height of CGI. Other animated characters from American music videos, such as MC Skat Kat, were directly influenced by the classic cartoon aesthetic.

Chuck Jones and Tex Avery's cartoons initially served as the main inspiration for the development of various video game franchises, such like: Bubsy, Gex, Crash Bandicoot, Spyro the Dragon, Jak and Daxter, Ratchet & Clank, Ty the Tasmanian Tiger, and Kao the Kangaroo, as well as heavily influencing the designs and slapstick humor of the original Ice Age, Madagascar, and Kung Fu Panda trilogies. Similarly, Banjo-Kazooie, Yooka-Laylee, and Lucky's Tale were made to attract a wide audience and with reference to Walter Lantz and Walt Disney's classic cartoons, while the video game franchise Sly Cooper was influenced by the designs of classic cel animated films. Additionally, Disney's period during the silent era and the golden age influenced the development of the video games Epic Mickey and Epic Mickey 2: The Power of Two. Furthermore, many classic Disney characters appear as protagonists in the video game franchise Kingdom Hearts. In addition, the 2017 video games Bendy and the Ink Machine and Cuphead, the 2022 interactive film Cat Burglar, the 2023 video game Enchanted Portals, and the 2026 video game Mouse: P.I. for Hire feature a classic animated art style influenced by the works of Walt Disney, Max Fleischer, and Tex Avery from this period.

=== Impact beyond the United States ===
The golden age of American animation, especially Walt Disney's cartoons, was very influential around the world, particularly:

- In Australia, classic American animations served as inspiration for Yoram Gross, leading to the creation of the films Dot and the Kangaroo (1977) and Blinky Bill: The Mischievous Koala (1992), as well as animated series such as Skippy: Adventures in Bushtown (1998).
- In Belgium, Walt Disney's cartoons served as inspiration for Morris in the designs of the Franco-Belgian comic Lucky Luke.
- In China, the Wan brothers animators were influenced by Disney and Fleischer animated feature films in making Princess Iron Fan (1941) and Havoc in Heaven (1961).
- In France, the animator Jean Image was influenced by the theatrical cartoons of this period. Likewise, Paul Grimault was influenced by Disney's animated feature films in making his magnum opus The King and the Mockingbird (first released in 1952 and starring Peter Ustinov as the mockingbird; in 1980 Grimault released his own version after acquiring the rights to the film).
- In Germany, animator Hans Fischerkoesen was influenced by the theatrical cartoons of this period. Likewise, Walt Disney's cartoons served as inspiration for Rolf Kauka in German comics, especially with Fix and Foxi, and the 1973 feature film Once Upon a Time.
- In Italy, the uncompleted animated feature film The Adventures of Pinocchio (1936) almost managed to compete with Walt Disney's animated productions. On the other hand, Bruno Bozzetto's 1976 film Allegro non troppo spoofs Fantasia.
- In Japan, the artist Osamu Tezuka was greatly influenced by Walt Disney's animation alongside the Fleischers. This allowed him to make the drawings of Kimba the White Lion, Astro Boy, and Princess Knight. Likewise, Fleischer and Walt Disney's cartoons served as inspiration for Shigeru Miyamoto, developing the Super Mario franchise, while Tex Avery's cartoons served to develop the videogame Dynamite Düx. Similarly, Naoto Ohshima was inspired by the mixed designs of Felix the Cat and Mickey Mouse to create the video game character Sonic the Hedgehog. In addition, Popeye and King Kong served as inspiration in making the 1981 arcade video game Donkey Kong, while the Rhedosaurus served as inspiration for Ishirō Honda in the production of the 1954 Japanese feature film Godzilla, developing the kaiju film genre during the Atomic Age. Furthermore, Pac-Man's playful chase dynamic was inspired by the back-and-forth antics seen in Tom and Jerry, and the Pac-Man ghosts were roughly inspired by Casper the Friendly Ghost, as stated by creator Toru Iwatani.
- In Russia, the animator Lev Atamanov was influenced by Disney's animated feature films in making The Snow Queen (1957).
- In Spain, the golden age influenced animators such as Arturo Moreno, José María Blay, Cruz Delgado, Sergio Pablos or the Cifesa studio. Highlighting feature films: Garbancito de la Mancha (1945), Alegres vacaciones (1948), Érase una vez... (1950), Los sueños de Tay-Pi (1952), Mágica aventura (1973), Los viajes de Gulliver (1983) and Klaus (2019), as well as the popular animated adaptations of Don Quixote (1979) and Los Trotamúsicos (1989). Likewise, Walt Disney's cartoons served as inspiration for José Sanchis Grau in Spanish comics, especially with El Soldadito Pepe and Pumby.
- In the United Kingdom, animated short films about war propaganda influenced the production of the feature film Animal Farm (1954), while Ray Harryhausen's stop motion inspired First Men in the Moon (1964), One Million Years B.C. (1966) and Clash of the Titans (1981).

== See also ==
- History of animation
- Animated cartoon
- Animation
- Cartoon
- List of animation shorts
- Animation in the United States during the silent era
- Golden Age of Comic Books
- Golden Age of Hollywood
- Golden Age of Radio
- Golden Age of Television
- Rubber hose animation - First American Animated style from the late-1920s to the mid-1930s
- The 50 Greatest Cartoons - a book featuring various animated cartoons from the golden age
- Who Framed Roger Rabbit - An 1988 live-action animated film heavily inspired by the Golden age of American animation
- Toon In with Me - the MeTV program featuring golden age cartoons from the 1920s to the 1960s

== Bibliography ==
- Barrier, Michael (1999). Hollywood Cartoons: American Animation in Its Golden Age. Oxford University Press. ISBN 9780198020790.
- Maltin, Leonard (1987): Of Mice and Magic: A History of American Animated Cartoons. Penguin Books.
- Ryfle, Steve; Godziszewski, Ed (2017). Ishiro Honda: A Life in Film, from Godzilla to Kurosawa. Wesleyan University Press. ISBN 9780819570871.
- Solomon, Charles (1994): The History of Animation: Enchanted Drawings. Outlet Books Company.
