= Bugged by a Bee =

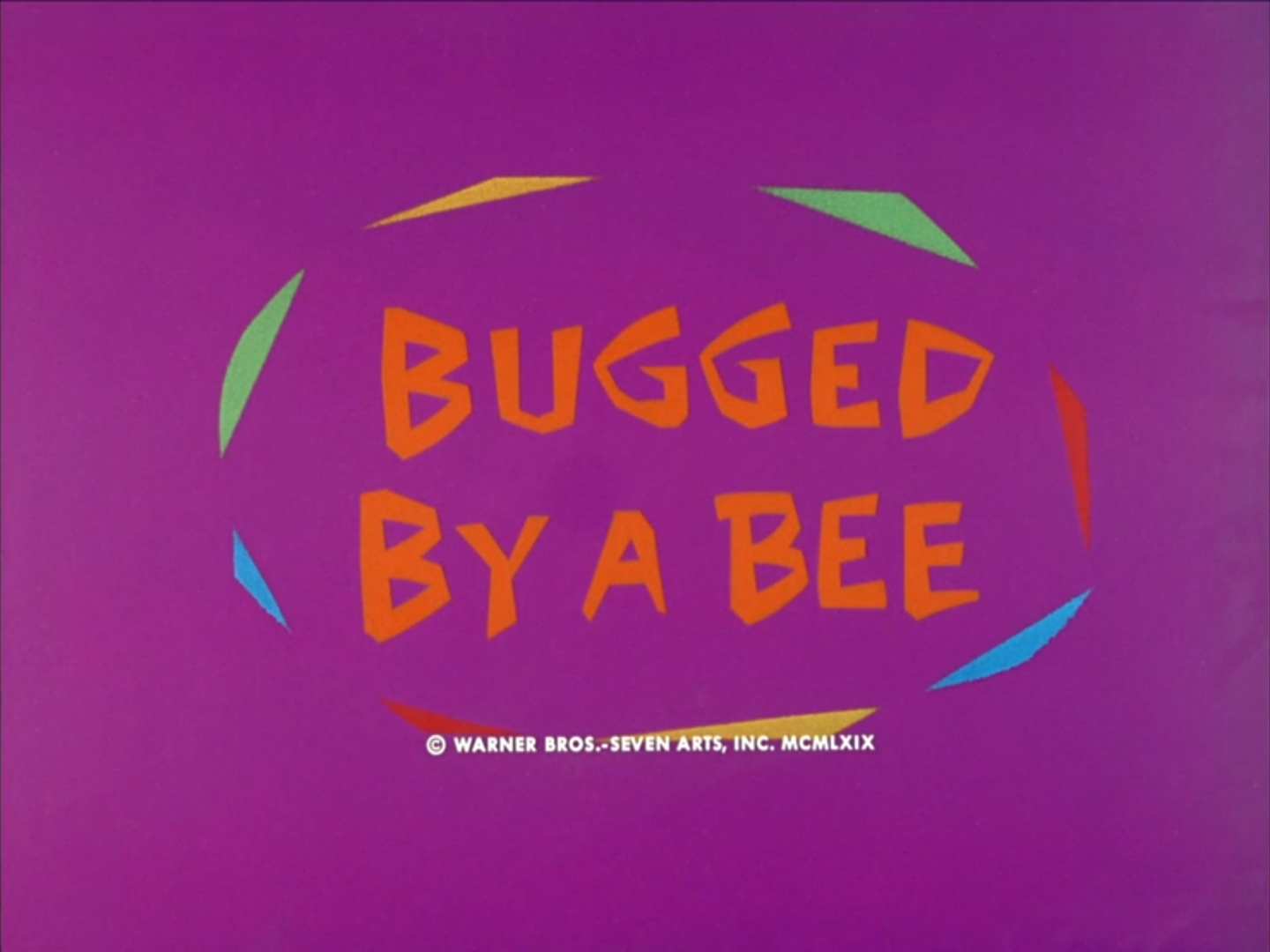
- Title card
- Directed by: Robert McKimson
- Story by: Cal Howard
- Produced by: William L. Hendricks
- Starring: Larry Storch
- Edited by: Don Douglas; Hal Geer
- Music by: William Lava
- Animation by: Ted Bonnicksen; Laverne Harding; Jim Davis; Ed Solomon
- Layouts by: Bob Givens; Jaime Diaz
- Backgrounds by: Bob Abrams
- Color process: Technicolor
- Production company: Warner Bros.-Seven Arts Animation
- Distributed by: Warner Bros.-Seven Arts; The Vitaphone Corporation
- Release date: July 26, 1969
- Running time: 6:21 min
- Language: English

Bugged by a Bee is a 1969 Warner Bros.-Seven Arts Looney Tunes animated cartoon directed by Robert McKimson. It starred Cool Cat, and was the final cartoon from the original Looney Tunes/Merrie Melodies series to bear the Looney Tunes name, and the last from that era to be widely released. One more cartoon, Injun Trouble, would follow Bugged by a Bee, but it was in the Merrie Melodies series.

This cartoon was the last Looney Tunes short until 1987's The Duxorcist.

== Synopsis ==
Cool Cat, a student at Disco Tech, sings about how he's "workin' through college to gain a lotta knowledge." A bee disturbs him which he swats to the ground with his guitar. As the angry bee sharpens its stinger, Cool Cat checks out the college's sports programs and decides to try out pole vaulting to impress the female students. His first attempt goes wrong when his pole gets stuck in a chipmunk's hole, and when he goes again the bee stings him as he begins his run-up. The pain gives Cool Cat enough power in his run-up to set a record-breaking vault over the pole and the college's baseball coach is impressed enough to let him try out for the team.

In his first baseball match Cool Cat tries to swat the bee instead of hitting the ball and records two strikes. On the crucial third ball Cool Cat hits a home run, which he completes with help from the bee's sting. The bee also helps him to triumph in rowing and hurdling. In an important football match which is 0–0 in the final few minutes, Cool Cat is stung causing him to swallow the ball and dart around the stadium, while the other players ask each other who has got the ball. Cool Cat flops down on the touchline and is stung once again, causing him to spit the ball out and score the winning touchdown.

The college holds a ceremony to honor Cool Cat's achievements, which have propelled Disco Tech to the top of the sports leagues. To Cool Cat's chagrin, however, the bee is celebrated at the ceremony rather than himself.

== See also ==
- List of American films of 1969

Preceded by 3 Ring Wing Ding	Cool Cat shorts 1969	Succeeded by Injun Trouble
