= Injun Trouble (1969 film) =

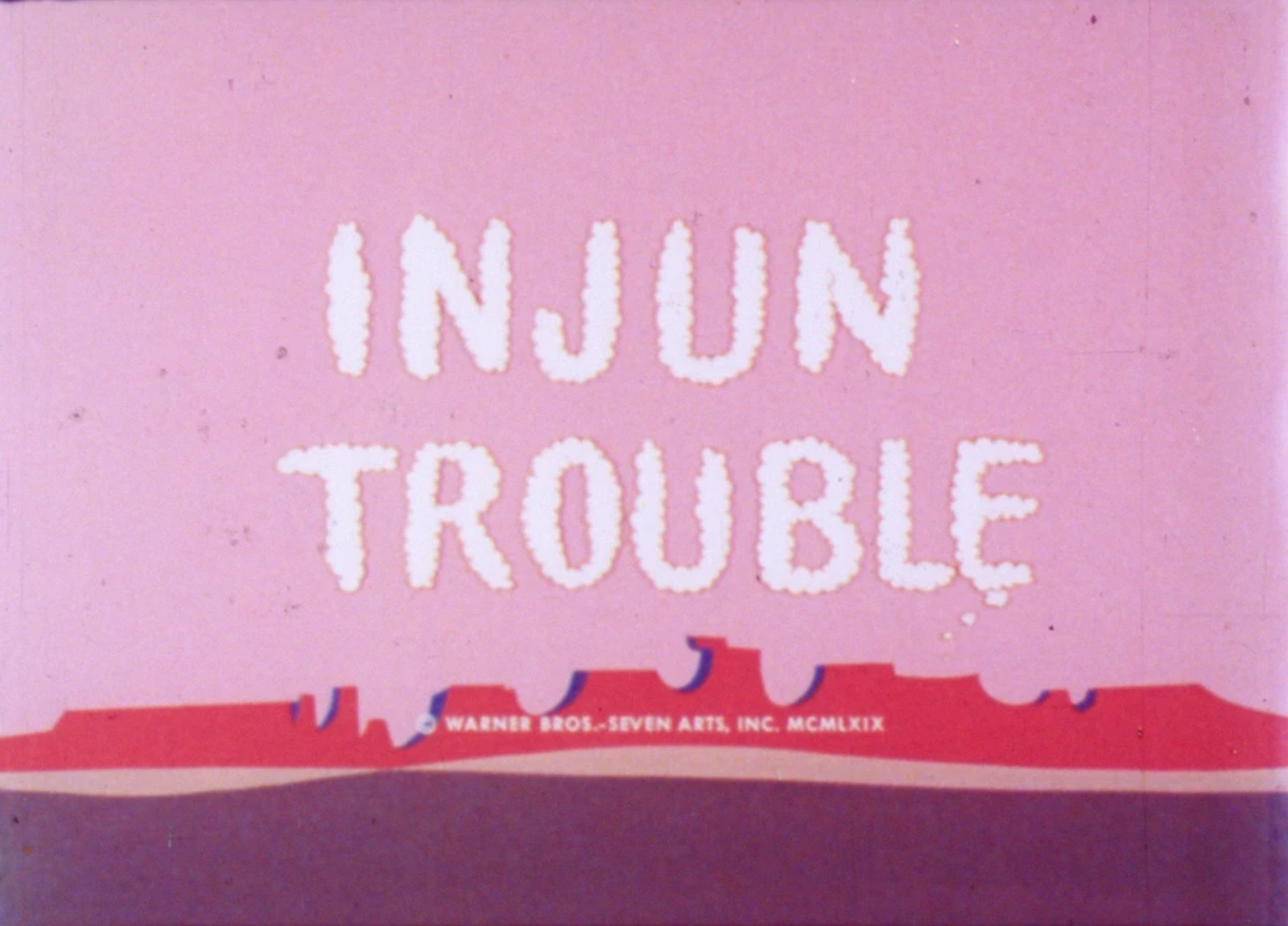
- Title card
- Directed by: Bob McKimson
- Story by: Cal Howard
- Produced by: Bill L. Hendricks
- Starring: Larry Storch
- Edited by: Hal Geer; Don Douglas
- Music by: William Lava
- Animation by: Ted Bonnicksen; Laverne Harding; Jim Davis; Ed Solomon
- Layouts by: Bob Givens; Jaime Diaz
- Backgrounds by: Bob McIntosh
- Color process: Technicolor
- Production company: Warner Bros.-Seven Arts Animation
- Distributed by: Warner Bros.-Seven Arts
- Release date: September 20, 1969
- Running time: 6:18
- Language: English

Injun Trouble is a 1969 Merrie Melodies cartoon, directed by Robert McKimson. The cartoon was released on September 20, 1969, and features Cool Cat. It is noted for being the last cartoon in the original Merrie Melodies series, ending a run that had continued since 1931, as well as the whole original Looney Tunes/Merrie Melodies series from 1930–1969. Additionally, this was the 1,000th cartoon short released by Warner Bros.

This cartoon was the last Merrie Melodies cartoon until The Fright Before Christmas ten years later in 1979. This cartoon was also the last Warner Bros. cartoon to be produced before Warner Bros.-Seven Arts Animation was shut down on October 10, 1969, and the second of the only two Cool Cat shorts directed by Robert McKimson, as well as the last Warner Bros. cartoon to be directed by him. The cartoon shares its name with an earlier short directed by Bob Clampett, which features Porky Pig.

== Plot ==
Cool Cat is driving to the town of Hotfoot, when his route happens to take him through an Indian reservation. Two scouts spot him and one of them gives chase, only to fall into a chasm when the weight of him and his horse causes the makeshift bridge to collapse. As Cool Cat drives along, he encounters more Native Americans in the following scenarios:

- Cool Cat is first stopped by a Native American man who gives his obese daughter away, much to Cool Cat's frustration.
- Cool Cat is not seen in the next gag, in which a Native American attempts to paint a stripe on his teepee, but quits in frustration after he finds that he failed to paint it in a complete circle. Then he paints a face on an aluminum pail and puts it over his head, calling himself a "pail-face".
- Cool Cat finds a bow and arrow on the ground, and he uses the bow to fire the arrow into the sky. An agitated Native American man with an arrow in his scalp approaches Cool Cat, and punches him in the nose.
- In another scene without the cat, a Native American uses a stenograph-like device to create smoke signals that read "Cool Cat go home."
- Cool Cat is then stopped by a more attractive woman that invites him for an "Indian Wrestle" - which turns out to be a fight with a man who is far larger than Cool Cat.
- Cool Cat is stopped by a Groucho Marx imitator who asks him, "Why?". Cool Cat remarks that he thought Native Americans asked "how". The Native American pulls out a cigar, remarks "Me know how, now I wanna know why.", and walks away.
- Cool Cat is stopped by one last Native American who asks him to hold his shirt. When Cool Cat asks why, the Native American states he is literally riding "bareback".

Finally arriving in Hotfoot, Cool Cat spots two horses playing with human shoes, a "Horse Doctor" who really is an equine, and a showdown between two gunslingers that ends with one's belt being shot, causing his pants to drop. Cool Cat does not express his astonishment, but verbalizes his lust on spotting a "Topless Saloon." He heads in, but discovers that the only topless person inside is the bartender, a rather burly man. An outlaw named Gower Gulch then arrives and seemingly challenges Cool Cat to a duel, but then settles for a game of poker. Cool Cat gets a good hand with four Aces, only for Gulch to say, "I've got a pair of deuces, and a six shooter." Announcing that he is "cutting out," Cool Cat produces a pair of scissors and cuts a hole out of the background, which he then disappears into. He then reappears for a moment and ends the cartoon (and the original series' run) with the words "So cool it now, ya hear?"

== Controversy ==
Owing to controversy over its stereotyping of Native Americans (and some racy puns such as "Indian wrestling" with a curvy Native American woman and the "topless saloon", along with the use of the ethnic slur "Injun" and being used as the reel's title), the cartoon has never been shown by American television broadcasters such as Cartoon Network, or released on any home video format. While bootleg versions are available (most commonly with a timecode on the image), it is one of the rarest of all Warner Bros. cartoons, owing to the relative unpopularity of cartoons from this era of the studio (unlike the "Censored Eleven", which were produced during the studio's heyday).

Preceded by Bugged by a Bee	Cool Cat shorts 1969	Succeeded by None (Final Episode)
