= Hal Geer =

American film producer (1916–2017)

- Born: Harold Eugene Geer; September 13, 1916; Oronogo, Missouri, U.S.
- Died: January 26, 2017 (aged 100); Simi Valley, California, U.S.
- Resting place: Pierce Brothers Valley Oaks Memorial Park
- Occupations: Filmmaker, film producer, animator
- Years active: 1950–1987
- Works: Looney Tunes; Merrie Melodies
- Spouses: Nancy Walker (m. 1939; died 1980) Carol Jones (m. 1983)
- Children: 2

Harold Eugene Geer (September 13, 1916 – January 26, 2017) was an American producer, filmmaker and animator, noteworthy for his association with the Looney Tunes franchise.

== Military career ==
Prior to his career in the entertainment industry, Geer served as a combat cameraman with the 16th Combat Camera Unit, enlisting just two weeks after the attack on Pearl Harbor. As a sergeant he participated in several major projects, including the film documentary China Crisis. He received a field commission to lieutenant, and took part in 86 combat missions during World War II. He remained in the Army Reserves for 24 years, achieving the rank of major. In addition to his flight duties, he also worked as a newsreel cameraman during the war, and his experience in this job helped him secure a position in the special effects department at Warner Bros. Cartoons after the war ended on September 2, 1945.

== Film career ==
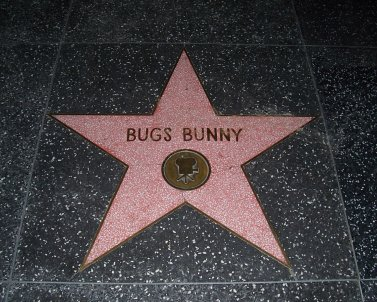
Bugs Bunny's star on the Hollywood Walk of Fame

Geer subsequently worked at Walt Disney Productions from 1950 to 1955 in the special effects department. Following his employment at Disney, Geer worked at a number of independent production companies before being brought back to Warner Bros. by producer William L. Hendricks in 1967, beginning a twenty-year association with Looney Tunes. Initially he served as the film editor (which, in the animation industry, means sound effects editor) on the Looney Tunes and Merrie Melodies cartoons, which lasted until 1969, when Warner Bros. ceased production of their theatrical shorts. However, Geer was retained in order to assist in production of The Bugs Bunny Show, and eventually elevated to co-producer of the show in 1975.

Following the retirement of Hendricks two years later, Geer took over his position and became the de facto head of the Looney Tunes series. In 1980, Warner Bros. officially re-established its cartoon studio as Warner Bros. Animation, with Geer installed as its first head. He was soon joined by veteran Looney Tunes director Friz Freleng, and together the two produced a number of compilation films and television specials, including The Looney Looney Looney Bugs Bunny Movie and Bugs Bunny's 3rd Movie: 1001 Rabbit Tales. During his stewardship of the new animation studio, Geer spearheaded a campaign to give Bugs Bunny his own star on the Hollywood Walk of Fame, which was granted in 1985.

== Later career ==
Geer retired from both Warner Bros. and the film industry in 1987, and subsequently took on a career of lecturing aboard cruise ships. He turned 100 on September 13, 2016 and died on January 26, 2017, in Simi Valley, California.

== See also ==
- List of centenarians (actors, filmmakers and entertainers)
