= Cool Cat (Looney Tunes) =

Warner Bros. theatrical cartoon character

- Looney Tunes character
- First appearance: Cool Cat (1967)
- Created by: Alex Lovy
- Designed by: Jaime Diaz
- Voiced by: Larry Storch (1967–1969); Joe Alaskey (1996); Jim Cummings (1999–2019); Eric Bauza (2018); Fred Tatasciore (2023)

In-universe information
- Species: Bengal tiger
- Gender: Male
- Nationality: American

Cool Cat is a fictional cartoon character created by director Alex Lovy for Warner Bros.-Seven Arts Animation. He was the final star of the original Warner Bros. theatrical cartoons. His first appearance was in an eponymous short in 1967. He was voiced by Larry Storch. Robert McKimson took over as director for the last two cartoons in this series.

In 1967, Jack L. Warner reorganized the Warner Bros. animation department, and hired Lovy away from Hanna-Barbera Productions to handle Warner's last two classic characters (Daffy Duck, Speedy Gonzales) and create some new cartoon series. The two series that Lovy developed were Cool Cat and Merlin the Magic Mouse.

Cool Cat is depicted as a humanoid Bengal tiger who wears a green beret and a scarf. His design resembles two other feline characters from the 1960s, the Pink Panther and Snagglepuss. He primarily speaks in beatnik slang, and acts as a typical laid-back teenager. He was mostly depicted while strumming his guitar or traveling in his dune buggy. Only one film depicted him playing varsity American football for his university.

== Biography ==
Cool Cat is a hip Bengal tiger (whose design was very similar to that of the Pink Panther and Snagglepuss) who wore a stylish green beret and scarf. Unlike most other Looney Tunes characters, Cool Cat was unapologetically a product of his time. He spoke in 1960s-style beatnik slang and acted much like a stereotypical laid-back 1960s teenager – he was often seen strumming a guitar or traveling cross-country in his dune buggy. One cartoon – McKimson's Bugged by a Bee – depicted him as an alumnus of "Disco Tech" playing varsity football against the long-haired team from "Hippie University".

However, most of Cool Cat's cartoons dealt with his encounters with Colonel Rimfire (also voiced by Storch), a fussy, British-accented big-game hunter armed with a blunderbuss. Rimfire essentially acted as the Elmer Fudd to Cool Cat's Bugs Bunny, but was used only by Lovy. Cool Cat bears the distinction of starring in the very last cartoon produced at the original Warner Bros. Cartoons studio prior to its shutdown: Injun Trouble in 1969.

His cartoons can easily be distinguished from most of the other Looney Tunes cartoons, as they feature an updated Looney Tunes logo with stylized animation, a 1967 remix of "The Merry-Go-Round Broke Down" by William Lava, and featuring the then-current Warner Bros.-Seven Arts logo (a combination of a simple W and 7 inside a stylized shield outline).

Cool Cat reappeared later in The Sylvester & Tweety Mysteries TV series, for which he was voiced by Joe Alaskey. He made brief cameos in most, if not all of the episodes, appearing on posters in the background, walking by in street scenes, etc. His appearances aren't entirely overlooked by the cast, as Tweety once responded to Cool Cat's appearance in the episode "Good Bird Hunting" with "You realize we had to stick this guy in someplace."

Cool Cat and Colonel Rimfire both appear in the 2000 direct-to-video movie Tweety's High-Flying Adventure. Granny makes a bet with Colonel Rimfire that Tweety is smarter than felines. As stipulated in the bet, Tweety will tour the world and collect 80 cats' paw prints in 80 days. Cool Cat makes a cameo appearance as a background member of Granny and Colonel Rimfire's Looney Club. Cool Cat was voiced by Jim Cummings and Colonel Rimfire was voiced by Joe Alaskey.

He later appears in the Looney Tunes Cartoons short "Happy Birthday Bugs Bunny!" in the opening crowd shot.

Cool Cat, Colonel Rimfire, Merlin the Magic Mouse, and Spooky the Ghost are the only W-7 Arts characters to make any further appearances, beyond the original shows, to date.

Cool Cat appears in an episode of Tiny Toons Looniversity, voiced by Fred Tatasciore.

Cool Cat makes a cameo in Coyote vs. Acme as a volunteer for the Acme Corporation's secret experiments, before going insane as a result of Project Sisyphus.

== Titles ==
- Cool Cat (1967)
- Big Game Haunt (1968)
- Hippydrome Tiger (1968)
- 3 Ring Wing-Ding (1968)
- Bugged by a Bee (1969)
- Injun Trouble (1969)
