= Warner Bros. Cartoons =

American animation studio (1930–1963)

Warner Bros. Cartoons, Inc.
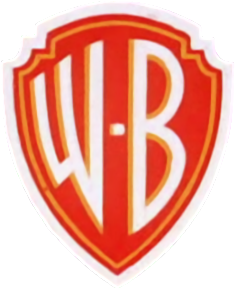
- Final logo, used from 1943 to 1949 and from 1954 to 1964
- Formerly: Leon Schlesinger Productions (1933–1944)
- Type: Private (1933–1944); Subsidiary (1944–1963)
- Industry: Animation; Motion pictures
- Founded: 1933; 93 years ago
- Founder: Leon Schlesinger
- Defunct: May 1963; 63 years ago
- Fate: Closed
- Successors: DePatie–Freleng Enterprises (1964–1980); Warner Bros.–Seven Arts Animation (1966–1969); Chuck Jones Enterprises (1970–2000); Warner Bros. Animation (1980–present)
- Headquarters: Los Angeles, California, U.S. (1933–1956); Burbank, California, U.S. (1956–1963)
- Key people: Leon Schlesinger; Edward Selzer; Friz Freleng; Chuck Jones; Robert McKimson; Tex Avery; Bob Clampett; Arthur Davis; Frank Tashlin; Mel Blanc; John W. Burton Sr. David H. DePatie
- Products: Animated theatrical short subjects Television shows
- Parent: Warner Bros. Pictures (1944–1963)

Warner Bros. Cartoons, Inc. was an American animation studio founded in 1933 by Leon Schlesinger after breaking up with Harman-Ising Productions. It produced the Looney Tunes and Merrie Melodies series of animated short films for Warner Bros. Pictures during the Golden Age of American animation, serving as the in-house animation division of Warner Bros. Pictures after Schlesinger sold the company to Warner Bros. in 1944. Its characters, including Bugs Bunny, Daffy Duck, and Porky Pig, are among the most famous and recognizable characters in the world. Many of the creative staff members at the studio, including directors and animators such as Chuck Jones, Friz Freleng, Ben Hardaway, Robert McKimson, Tex Avery, Bob Clampett, Arthur Davis, and Frank Tashlin, are considered major figures in the art and history of traditional animation.

The studio closed in 1963, and Looney Tunes and Merrie Melodies were subsequently subcontracted to Freleng's DePatie–Freleng Enterprises studio from 1964 to 1967. Warner Bros. Cartoons re-opened that year, under Warner Bros.–Seven Arts, before closing again in 1969. It was succeeded by Warner Bros. Animation, which was established in 1980.

== History ==
=== 1930–1933: Harman-Ising Productions ===
Leon Schlesinger worked in theaters as an usher, songbook agent, actor, and manager, including at the Palace Theatre in Buffalo, New York. He founded Pacific Title & Art Studio in 1919, where most of his business was producing title cards for silent films. As talking pictures ("talkies") replaced silents in 1929 and 1930, Schlesinger looked for ways to capitalize on the new technology and stay in business. He discovered animators Hugh Harman and Rudolf Ising, who founded Harman-Ising Productions in Hollywood, California and pitched the Looney Tunes series starring Bosko to Schlesinger. Schlesinger was impressed by the test film and negotiated a distribution deal with Warner Bros. Pictures through his connections. Ising started the Merrie Melodies series in 1931, allowing the studio to be profitable by promoting records of songs owned by Warner Bros.' subsidiaries. Outside of cartoons, Schlesinger also produced six Western films starring John Wayne in 1932 and 1933, which were lambasted by Wayne for their extremely low budgets.

In 1933, Harman and Ising parted company with Schlesinger over financial disputes, taking all characters they established with them to Metro-Goldwyn-Mayer. To maintain his contract with Warner Bros., Schlesinger set up his own studio on the Warner Bros. lot on Sunset Boulevard in Hollywood. The studio location was the former Vitaphone building at the corner of Van Ness and Fernwood.

=== 1933–1944: Leon Schlesinger Productions ===
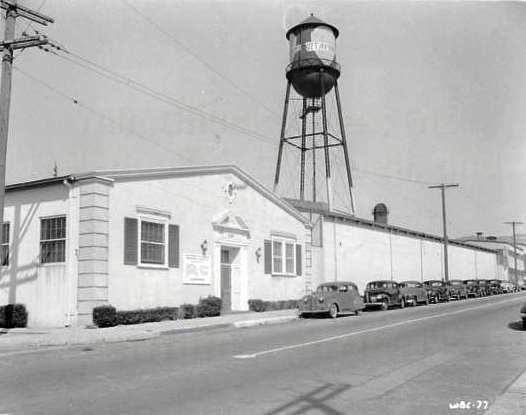
Leon Schlesinger Productions studio, part of the Old Warner Brothers Studio, 1351 North Van Ness Avenue, Los Angeles, California.

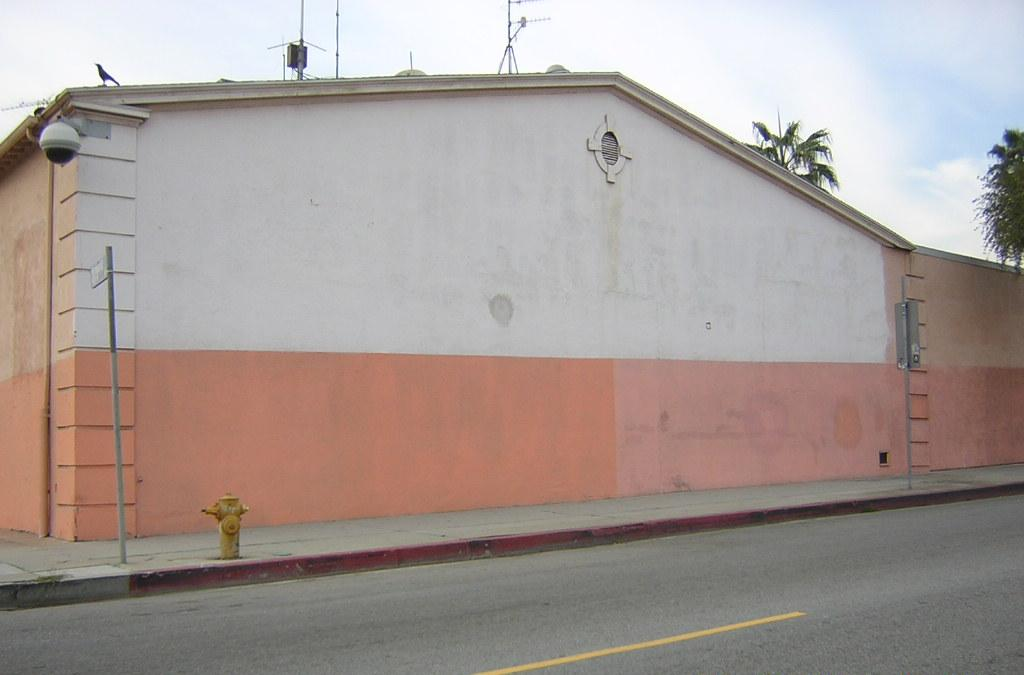
Former Leon Schlesinger-Warner Bros. Cartoons studio, 2003

The Schlesinger studio got off to a slow start, hiring Harman-Ising staff such as Bob Clampett and Robert McKimson, as well as poaching staff from Walt Disney Productions; the studio continued their one-shot Merrie Melodies and introduced Buddy to serve as the new star of Looney Tunes. Harman-Ising alumnus Friz Freleng was poached to replace the studio's first director, Tom Palmer, after Palmer was fired for unsatisfactory work. The studio then formed the three-unit structure that it would retain throughout most of its history, with one unit headed by Freleng, one unit headed by Ben "Bugs" Hardaway, and one by Earl Duvall, who was replaced by Jack King a year later.

In 1935, after Buddy proved to be unsuccessful, Freleng directed the Merrie Melodies cartoon I Haven't Got a Hat, which introduced the characters Beans and Porky Pig. While Beans was intended to be the series' new protagonist, he was quickly overshadowed by Porky and retired, in part due to the popularity of solo Porky cartoons directed by Universal Pictures alumnus Fred Avery and newly rejoined director Frank Tashlin, which established Porky as one of the studio's leading stars for decades. Schlesinger also gradually moved the Merrie Melodies cartoons from black and white, to two-strip Technicolor in 1934, and finally to full three-strip Technicolor in 1935. The Looney Tunes series would be produced in black-and-white for much longer, until 1943. Both series also evolved away from its roots in promoting music to focusing on humor.

Because of the limited spacing conditions in the Schlesinger building at 1351 N. Van Ness on the Warner Sunset lot, Avery and his unit – including animators Bob Clampett and Chuck Jones – were moved into a small building elsewhere on the Sunset lot, which Avery and his team affectionately dubbed "Termite Terrace". Although the Avery unit moved out of the building after a year, moving into the Van Ness studio location, "Termite Terrace" later became a metonym for the classic Warner Bros. animation department in general, even for years after the building was abandoned, condemned, and torn down. During this period, four cartoons were outsourced to Animated Pictures; despite the quality being on par with the studio's output, Ub Iwerks disliked the experience and left midway, allowing Clampett to gain directorial experience while finishing two of the four cartoons. Schlesinger was so impressed by Clampett's work on these shorts that he opened a fourth unit for Clampett to lead. Its management was overseen by Ray Katz due to tax reasons; this unit was not allowed to produce Technicolor cartoons to save costs.

Animation directors and animators such as Freleng, Hardaway, Avery, Clampett, Jones, McKimson, Arthur Davis, and Tashlin worked at the studio. During this period, these creators introduced several of the most popular cartoon characters to date, including Daffy Duck, Elmer Fudd, Bugs Bunny and Tweety. Freleng first left the studio in 1937 to work for Metro-Goldwyn-Mayer and Tashlin took over Freleng's former unit, while Tashlin's own position as the director of the Schlesinger studio was taken by Cal Howard and Cal Dalton; Howard's role, in turn, barely lasted a year, before Howard left for Fleischer Studios, and Ben Hardaway returned to the studio as director to replace him. Tashlin left the studio in 1938, and his second unit was taken over by Chuck Jones. Freleng returned to the studio in 1939 to take over the former Hardaway/Dalton unit. Avery left the studio in 1941 following a series of disputes with Schlesinger, bringing vital staff of his unit such as Rich Hogan to MGM. Schlesinger shortly after closed the studio for two weeks due to a minor strike similar to the better known one that occurred at Disney. A few months earlier he banished all unionized employees in what became known in retrospect as the "Looney Tune Lockout"; this time Schlesinger lost nearly all of his employees of the Avery unit, excluding its key animators. Clampett and several of his own artists took over Avery's former unit, while Clampett's own position as director of the Schlesinger-Katz studio was taken by Norman McCabe, who lasted barely a year before being drafted. Frank Tashlin returned to the studio in late 1942 to replace McCabe in the Schlesinger-Katz unit until 1944.

By 1942, the Schlesinger studio had surpassed Walt Disney Productions as the most successful producer of animated shorts in the United States. Between 1942 and 1945, the Schlesinger studio produced a number of films for the United States military in support of its efforts in World War II. Under the command of the US Air Force's First Motion Picture Unit, headed from 1942 to 1944 by Major Theodor Seuss Geisel (better known as Dr. Seuss), the studio produced the Private Snafu and (with Walter Lantz Productions) Mr. Hook cartoons for the servicemen's entertainment.

=== 1944–1963: Warner Bros. Cartoons ===
'No Buddy Atoll', Private Snafu cartoon directed by Chuck Jones in 1945

On July 1, 1944, Schlesinger sold his studio to Warner Bros. for $700,000; Warners renamed the company Warner Bros. Cartoons, Inc., and Edward Selzer – who by Jones' and Freleng's accounts had no sense of humor or admiration of cartoons – was appointed by Warner Bros. as the new head of the cartoon studio after Schlesinger retired. Frank Tashlin left in September 1944, and Bob Clampett left in May 1945. Tashlin's Katz-managed unit was taken over by Robert McKimson. The remaining animators of Clampett's second unit were assigned to Arthur Davis. McKimson and Davis worked with lower budgets than Jones and Freleng.

In 1948, the studio moved to a larger building on the Sunset Boulevard lot. Davis' separate unit was dissolved in November 1947, and he became an animator for Freleng.

The directors became noted by their respective styles; Jones' cartoons, with the largest budgets, featured a more visual and sophisticated art style, and focused more on unique story telling and characterization over traditional gags. Freleng's cartoons developed a conservative directorial style that featured sharp timing, slapstick and use of music for comedic effect. Tashlin's cartoons were known for their cinematic influences, subtle innuendos and irreverent humor, traits that carried to his live-action films after he left the studio. Clampett's cartoons were known for a highly elastic and energetic animation style mixed with sexual innuendos, surreal humor and overt cartoon violence. McKimson's cartoons focused on more refined animation and straightforward humor that references radio and television, though his later cartoons were notably safer in direction. Davis' cartoons are similar to his works Screen Gems, often focusing on animation and gags over the stories.

Among the Warner Bros. cartoon stars who were created after Schlesinger's departure include Pepé Le Pew (1945, Odor-able Kitty by Jones), Sylvester (1945, Life with Feathers by Freleng), Yosemite Sam (1945, Hare Trigger by Freleng), Foghorn Leghorn (1946, Walky Talky Hawky by McKimson), Marvin the Martian (1948, Haredevil Hare by Jones), Wile E. Coyote and the Road Runner (1949, Fast and Furry-ous by Jones), Granny (1950, Canary Row by Freleng), Speedy Gonzales (1953, Cat-Tails for Two by McKimson) and The Tasmanian Devil (1954, Devil May Hare by McKimson). In later years, even more minor Looney Tunes characters such as Freleng's Rocky and Mugsy, Jones's Gossamer and Michigan J. Frog, Clampett/Davis' Goofy Gophers and McKimson's Pete Puma have become significantly popular.

After the verdict of the United States v. Paramount Pictures, Inc. anti-trust case in 1948 ended the practice of "block booking", Warner Bros. could no longer force theaters into buying their features and shorts together as packages; shorts had to be sold separately. Theater owners were only willing to pay so much for cartoon shorts, and as a result, by the late-1950s the budgets at Warner Bros. Cartoons became tighter. Selzer forced a stringent five-week production schedule on each cartoon. At least one director, Chuck Jones, cheated the system by spending more time on special cartoons such as What's Opera, Doc?, and less time on simpler productions such as Road Runner entries, and had his crew forge their time cards. With less money for full animation, the Warner Bros. writers — Michael Maltese, Tedd Pierce, and Warren Foster — began to focus more of their cartoons on dialogue. While story artists were assigned to directors at random during the 1930s and 1940s, by the 1950s each story man worked almost exclusively with one director: Maltese with Jones, Foster with Freleng, and Pierce with McKimson.

With the advent of the 3-D film craze in 1953, Warner Bros. shut its cartoon studio down in June of that year, fearing that 3-D cartoon production would be too expensive (only one Warner Bros. cartoon was ever produced in 3-D, Jones' Lumber Jack-Rabbit starring Bugs Bunny). The creative staff dispersed (Jones, for example, went to work at Disney on Sleeping Beauty, Maltese went to Walter Lantz Productions, and Freleng went into commercial work). Warner Bros. Cartoons re-opened five months after its closure, following the end of the 3-D craze. In 1955, the staff moved into a brand new facility on the main Warner Bros. lot in Burbank. KTLA television took over the old studio location on Van Ness; the old Warner Sunset Studios is today called Sunset Bronson Studios.

By 1958, Selzer had retired, and veteran Warner Cartoons production manager John Burton took his place. Warner Bros. also lost its trio of staff storymen at this time. Foster and Maltese found work at Hanna-Barbera Productions, while Pierce worked on a freelance basis with writing partner Bill Danch. John Dunn and Dave Detiege, both former Disney men, were hired to replace Foster and Maltese.

==== Entry into Television ====
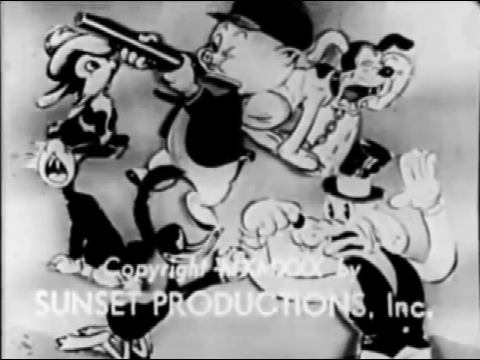
A Sunset Productions notice on a TV print of a Warner Bros. cartoon

Warner Bros. Pictures had formed a television production and licensing subsidiary named Sunset Productions, Inc. in the 1950s, headed by Jack M. Warner and separate from Warner Bros. Television. Its first planned production was a series of half-hour shows titled Men of the Sky, but this did not come to fruition. On February 12, 1955, Warner Bros. sold the TV distribution rights to 191 of their black-and-white cartoons through this subsidiary to Guild Films. The cartoons part of the deal were all black-and-white Looney Tunes shorts and all black-and-white non-Harman/Ising Merrie Melodies shorts. All references to Warner Bros. in the cartoons were removed because Warner did not want to antagonize theater owners as a result of their television deals. In April 1957, Sunset Productions changed its name to Warner Bros. TV Commercial and Industrial Films and on January 20, 1960, it was announced that this subsidiary was being merged into Warner Bros. Cartoons following the resignation of John Burton from the latter. Guild Films would hold onto the TV rights it had until its bankruptcy on March 6, 1961, after which those rights would return to Warner Bros. and then be acquired by Seven Arts Associated.

In the fall of 1960, ABC premiered Warner Bros. Television's The Bugs Bunny Show, which was a package program featuring three theatrical Warner Bros. cartoons, with newly produced wraparounds to introduce each short. The program remained on the air under various names and on all three major networks for four decades from 1960 to 2000. All versions of The Bugs Bunny Show featured Warner Bros. cartoons released after July 31, 1948, as all of the Technicolor cartoons released before that date were sold to Associated Artists Productions on June 11, 1956.

David H. DePatie became the last executive in charge of the original Warner Bros. Cartoons studio in 1961. The same year, Chuck Jones moonlighted to write the script for a UPA-produced feature titled Gay Purr-ee. When that film was picked up by Warner Bros. for distribution in 1962, the studio learned that Jones had violated his exclusive contract with Warners and he was terminated in July. Most of Jones' former unit subsequently re-joined him at Sib Tower 12 Productions to work on a new series of Tom and Jerry cartoons for MGM.

In late 1962, at the height of television popularity and decline in moviegoing, DePatie was called to a board meeting in New York, and he was informed that the cartoon studio was going to be shut down. DePatie completed the task by 1963. The final project at the studio was making the animated sequences, directed by McKimson, for the 1964 Warner Bros. feature The Incredible Mr. Limpet. With the studio closed, Hal Seeger Productions in New York had to be contracted to produce the opening and closing credits for The Porky Pig Show, which debuted on ABC on September 20, 1964. This marked one of the first times that the Looney Tunes characters were animated outside of the Los Angeles area.

=== 1964–1967: DePatie–Freleng Enterprises and Format Productions ===
David H. DePatie and Friz Freleng started DePatie–Freleng Enterprises in 1963, and leased the old Warner Bros. Cartoons studio as their headquarters. In 1964, Warner Bros. contracted DePatie–Freleng to produce more Looney Tunes and Merrie Melodies, an arrangement that lasted until 1967. The vast majority of these paired off Daffy Duck against Speedy Gonzales, and after a few initial cartoons directed by Freleng, Robert McKimson was hired to direct most of the remaining DePatie–Freleng Looney Tunes.

In addition to DePatie–Freleng's cartoons, a series of new shorts featuring Wile E. Coyote and the Road Runner was commissioned from an independent animation studio, Herbert Klynn's Format Productions. Veteran Warner animator Rudy Larriva, who had worked for years under Road Runner creator Chuck Jones, assumed directorial duties for these films, and a few other former associates of Jones (Bob Bransford, Ernie Nordli) came aboard. Even with the Jones connections, Larriva's Road Runner shorts were considered to be inferior and witless compared to Jones' by critics. McKimson also directed an additional two Road Runner shorts with the main DePatie–Freleng team, which are more highly regarded than Larriva's efforts.

After three years of outsourced cartoons, Warner Bros. decided to bring production back in-house. DePatie–Freleng had their contract terminated (they subsequently moved to new studios in the San Fernando Valley), and Format was commissioned to produce three "buffer" cartoons with Daffy and Speedy (again, directed by Rudy Larriva) to fill the gap until Warner Bros.'s own studio was up and running again.

=== 1967–1969: Warner Bros.–Seven Arts Animation ===
Warner Bros.–Seven Arts Animation
- Formerly: Warner Bros. Animation (1966–1967)
- Predecessor: Warner Bros. Cartoons
- Founded: May 17, 1966; 60 years ago
- Founder: William L. Hendricks
- Defunct: October 10, 1969; 57 years ago
- Fate: Closed
- Successor: Warner Bros. Animation
- Key people: Alex Lovy; Robert McKimson; Cal Howard; Bob Kurtz; William L. Hendricks; Mel Blanc; Larry Storch; William Lava; Hal Geer; Don Douglas; David Hanan; Robert Givens; Laverne Harding; Lin Larsen; Bob Abrams; Bob Inman; Bob McIntosh
- Products: Cool Cat; Speedy Gonzales; Daffy Duck
- Parent: Warner Bros.–Seven Arts

The studio was originally founded in May 1966 as Warner Bros. Animation, after its contract with DePatie–Freleng Enterprises expired. The new cartoon studio was to be founded and headed by studio executive William L. Hendricks, and after an unsuccessful attempt at luring Bob Clampett out of retirement, former Walter Lantz Productions and Hanna-Barbera animator Alex Lovy was appointed director at the new studio. He brought his longtime collaborator, Laverne Harding to be the new studio's chief animator, and brought in Disney animator Volus Jones and Ed Solomon who also started at Disney as an assistant, which contributed to make cartoons from this era of the studio stylistically quite different from the studio's "Golden Age". Lovy also brought in animator Ted Bonnicksen and layout artist Bob Givens, both veterans of the original studio. Shortly after the studio opened, Warner Bros. Pictures was bought out by Seven Arts Associates, and the studio renamed Warner Bros.–Seven Arts.

Initially, Lovy's new team produced more Daffy Duck and Speedy Gonzales cartoons, but soon moved to create new characters such as Cool Cat and Merlin the Magic Mouse, and even occasional experimental works such as Norman Normal (1968), the only cartoon not to be in either series. Warner Bros.–Seven Arts intended to develop more original characters during Lovy's tenure, but most of them never went into fruition. Some of these character pitches included The Super Snooper (which was recently used on The Quick Draw McGraw Show and a Daffy Duck cartoon from 1952), a pirate character named Jolly Roger (who is described in retrospect as a clone of Yosemite Sam), a Tasmanian Devil-esque rival for Speedy named Butch Catsidy, a series based on the character Spooky from the Cool Cat cartoon Big Game Haunt (1968), and new a Road Runner and Coyote series starring the Bird Watcher, in a parody of nature documentaries. Other scrapped pitches included adaptations of Mack Sennett's Keystone Cops and Puff the Magic Dragon, and a television series based on Al Capp's Li'l Abner comics. A number of pitches however were retrofitted into either Cool-Cat/Merlin cartoons or as one-shots.

Lovy's cartoons were not well received, and many enthusiasts regard them (particularly his Daffy and Speedy efforts) as the worst cartoons ever produced by the studio. After a year, Alex Lovy left and returned to Hanna-Barbera along with Volus Jones, and Robert McKimson from DePatie–Freleng was hired to replace Lovy with Jim Davis taking over for Volus Jones. McKimson focused on using the characters that Lovy had created (and two of his own creation: Bunny and Claude). The studio's classic characters appeared only in advertisements (as for Plymouth Road Runner) and cartoon show bumpers. McKimson's films were regarded as an improvement over Lovy's. On October 10, 1969, three months after Warner Bros.–Seven Arts was acquired by Kinney National Company, Warner Bros. ceased production on all its short subjects and shut the studio down for good. The back catalog of Looney Tunes and Merrie Melodies shorts would remain a popular broadcast and syndication package for Warner Bros. Television well into the 2000s, by which time it had reacquired the distribution rights to the pre-August 1948 shorts it sold to Associated Artists Productions (known as a.a.p.) on June 11, 1956.

== Warner Bros. Cartoons, Inc. staff: (1933–1969) ==
=== Studio heads ===
- Leon Schlesinger (1933–1944)
- Eddie Selzer (1944–1958)
- John Burton (1958–1961)
- David H. DePatie (1961–1964)
- William L. Hendricks (1967–1969)

=== Directors ===
- Tex Avery (1935–1942) (credited as Fred Avery)
- Ted Bonnicksen (1963)
- Bernard B. Brown (1934)
- Gerry Chiniquy (1964)
- Bob Clampett (1937–1946) (credited as Robert Clampett)
- Cal Dalton (1938–1940)
- Arthur Davis (1946–1949, 1962)
- Earl Duvall (1933–1934)
- Friz Freleng (1934–1938, 1940–1964) (credited until late 1935 as Isadore Freleng and until late 1955 as I. Freleng)
- Ben Hardaway (1934–1935, 1938–1940)
- Ken Harris (1959)
- Cal Howard (1938)
- Ub Iwerks (1937)
- Chuck Jones (1938–1964) (credited until late 1940 as Charles Jones and until late 1955 as Charles M. Jones)
- Jack King (1934–1936)
- Abe Levitow (1959–1962)
- Alex Lovy (1967–1968)
- Norman McCabe (1940–1943)
- Robert McKimson (1946–1964, 1968–1969)
- Phil Monroe (1963–1964)
- Maurice Noble (1961–1964)
- Tom Palmer (1933)
- Hawley Pratt (1961–1964)
- Frank Tashlin (1936–1938, 1943–1946)
- Richard Thompson (1963)

=== Storyboard artists/writers ===
- Howard Baldwin
- Nick Bennion
- David Detiege
- John Dunn
- Warren Foster
- Ben Hardaway
- George Hill
- Cal Howard
- Rich Hogan
- Lew Landsman
- Lou Lilly
- Sid Marcus
- Michael Maltese
- George Manuell
- Melvin Millar
- Jack Miller
- Dave Monahan
- Fred Neiman
- Tedd Pierce
- Bill Scott
- Lloyd Turner
- Sid Sutherland
- Michael Sasanoff
- John Elliotte
- Webb Smith

=== Layout/Background artists/designers ===
- Pete Alvarado
- Philip DeGuard
- Gene Fleury
- Nic Gibson
- Robert Givens
- Robert Gribbroek
- Alex Ignatiev
- John Didrik Johnsen
- Willie Ito
- Paul Julian
- Earl Klein
- John McGrew
- Tom McKimson
- Maurice Noble
- Ernie Nordli
- Tom O'Loughlin
- Hawley Pratt
- David Rose
- Michael Sasanoff
- Don Smith
- William Butler
- Richard H. Thomas
- Cornett Wood
- Irv Wyner
- Gene Hazelton

=== Animators ===
- Fred Abranz
- Art Babbitt
- Warren Batchelder
- Robert Bentley
- Richard Bickenbach
- Ted Bonnicksen
- Jack Bradbury
- Bob Bransford
- Pete Burness
- George Cannata
- Robert Cannon
- John Carey
- Jack Carr
- Ken Champin
- Gerry Chiniquy
- Bob Clampett
- Ben Clopton
- Herman Cohen
- James Culhane
- Cal Dalton
- Keith Darling
- Basil Davidovich
- Arthur Davis
- Jim Davis
- Phil DeLara
- Jaime Diaz
- Joe D'Igalo
- Russ Dyson
- Robert Edmunds
- Isadore Ellis
- Paul Fennell
- John Freeman
- Ed Friedman
- A. C. Gamer
- John Gibbs
- George Grandpre
- Manny Gould
- Lee Halpern
- Rollin Hamilton
- Laverne Harding
- Ken Harris
- Emery Hawkins
- Alex Ignatiev
- Chuck Jones
- Fred Jones
- Volus Jones
- Jack King
- Anatolle Kirsanoff
- Rudy Larriva
- Art Leonardi
- Abe Levitow
- Harry Love
- Bob Matz
- Norman McCabe
- Tom McDonald
- John McGrew
- Charles McKimson
- Robert McKimson
- Thomas McKimson
- Bill Melendez
- Phil Monroe
- Al Pabian
- Jim Pabian
- Ray Patin
- Manuel Perez
- Tom Ray
- Bob Richardson
- Vive Risto
- Virgil Ross
- Rod Scribner
- Hank Smith
- Paul Smith
- Ed Solomon
- Irven Spence
- Robert Stokes
- Cecil Surry
- Sid Sutherland
- Bob Taylor
- Richard Thompson
- Riley Thomson
- Frank Tipper
- Gil Turner
- Lloyd Vaughan
- Sandy Walker
- Elmer Wait
- Ben Washam
- Volney White
- Bob Wickersham
- Don Williams

=== Voices ===
- Friz Freleng
- Chuck Jones
- Carl W. Stalling
- Mel Blanc
- Tex Avery
- Dave Barry
- Dick Beals
- Bea Benaderet
- Julie Bennett
- Sara Berner
- Billy Bletcher
- Lucille Bliss
- Billy Booth
- Robert C. Bruce
- Arthur Q. Bryan
- Daws Butler
- Pinto Colvig
- Joe Dougherty
- June Foray
- Stan Freberg
- Joan Gerber
- Frank Graham
- Bernice Hansen
- Margaret Hill-Talbot
- Cal Howard
- Paul Julian
- Abe Lyman
- Michael Maltese
- Tedd Pierce
- Alan Reed
- Marian Richman
- Kent Rogers
- Hal Smith
- John T. Smith
- Larry Storch
- Bill Thompson
- Danny Webb
- Nancy Wible

=== Music ===
==== Musical Directors ====
- Bernard B. Brown (1933–1936)
- Norman Spencer (1933–1936)
- Carl W. Stalling (1936–1958) (credited from 1946 to 1958 as Carl Stalling)
- Eugene Poddany (1951)
- Milt Franklyn (1954–1962)
- John Seely (1958)
- William Lava (1962–1964, 1967–1969) (credited until 1967 as Bill Lava)

==== Orchestrations ====
- Milt Franklyn (1936–1962)

=== Film (sound effects) editors ===
- Treg Brown
- Irvin Jay
- Lee Gunther
- Hal Geer

== See also ==
- Harman-Ising Productions
- The Golden Age of American animation
- Looney Tunes
- Merrie Melodies
- Warner Bros. Animation
- List of animation studios owned by Warner Bros. Discovery

== Bibliography ==
- Maltin, Leonard (1987) [1980]. Of Mice and Magic: A History of American Animated Cartoons. New York: Plume. ISBN 0-452-25993-2.
- Barrier, Michael (1999). Hollywood Cartoons: American Animation in Its Golden Age. Oxford: Oxford University Press. ISBN 0-19-516729-5.
- Jones, Chuck (1989). Chuck Amuck : The Life and Times of an Animated Cartoonist. New York: Farrar Straus & Giroux. ISBN 0-374-12348-9.
- Beck, Jerry (1989). Looney Tunes and Merrie Melodies: A Complete Illustrated Guide to the Warner Bros. Cartoons. New York: Holt Paperbacks. ISBN 0-8050-0894-2.
