= William L. Hendricks =

American film producer (1904–1992)

William L. Hendricks (May 3, 1904 – March 29, 1992) was a former USMCR Colonel who was the key figure in setting up the "Toys for Tots" program. Aside from his USMCR career, he also worked in the film industry for many years, initially as a documentary producer for the United States Army, then as a production executive at Warner Bros.-Seven Arts, where he eventually became the final producer of the Looney Tunes series.

In 1947, Hendricks, then a Major in the USMCR was asked by his wife Diane to donate some toys (including ones she had made herself) to an organization that gave out toys to needy children. However, his research found that no such organization existed, and he resolved to start one himself. He led a toy collection in the Los Angeles area with several family and friends that eventually amassed some 5,000 toys. This pilot program proved so successful that the Marine Corps adopted it as an official campaign the following year, and Hendricks helped make it even more of a success by using his contacts through Warner Bros.-Seven Arts to persuade many celebrities to support the charity.

His career as a documentary producer saw him win an Academy Honorary Award in 1961 for his part in the Marine Corps documentary A Force in Readiness. In 1966 he was asked by Warner Bros.-Seven Arts to take over as head of their newly reformed animation studio, as well as becoming overall head of the Looney Tunes franchise. The new animation studio started producing cartoons in 1967 and lasted only two years and produced few cartoons of note before shutting down in 1969. However, Hendricks remained in a supervisory role, overseeing production on The Bugs Bunny Show and other television shows featuring Looney Tunes cartoons. He remained in this role until 1977 when he finally retired from the film industry at the age of 73.
