= Slick McWolf =

Cartoon character

- Droopy character
- Slick McWolf and Red in the 1945 animated short Swing Shift Cinderella.
- First appearance: Blitz Wolf (August 22, 1942; 84 years ago)
- Created by: Tex Avery
- Voiced by: Bill Thompson (1942); Frank Graham (1943–1946); Kent Rogers (1943); Billy Bletcher (1945); Patrick McGeehan (1945); William Hanna (1946); Daws Butler (1949); Manuel Paris (1952); Frank Welker (1980–1993); Lou Scheimer (1980); Will Ryan (1999); Dave Redl (2001); John DiMaggio (2012); Stephen Stanton (2018–present)

In-universe information
- Full name: Slick McWolf
- Aliases: Slick Wolf; Wally Wolf; Killer Joe; Wolfie
- Species: Gray wolf
- Gender: Male

Slick McWolf, also known as Slick Wolf or simply the Big Bad Wolf, is a cartoon character created by animation director Tex Avery for Metro-Goldwyn-Mayer. One of Avery's most prominent characters and a frequent antagonist of Droopy, he is a lecherous and scheming individual who never succeeds thanks to the consequences of his own actions. Due to his frequent sexual harassment of female characters, he is the namesake of wolf-whistling.

== History ==
Slick McWolf debuted in Blitz Wolf (1942) as Adolf Wolf, a caricature of Adolf Hitler. The Avery Wolf returned as a Hollywood swinger in Red Hot Riding Hood (1943), memorably aroused by Red's song and dance performance. Further girl-chasing roles came to the Wolf in Swing Shift Cinderella, Wild and Woolfy and Little Rural Riding Hood; simultaneously, the Wolf was used as foe against Avery's Droopy, a role he would keep into the 1950s. He would later reprise the role in the "Droopy and Dripple" segments of Hanna-Barbera's Tom & Jerry Kids (1990).

Slick McWolf was voiced by Bill Thompson (Blitz Wolf), Frank Graham (Dumb-Hounded, Red Hot Riding Hood, The Shooting of Dan McGoo, Swing Shift Cinderella, Northwest Hounded Police), Kent Rogers (Red Hot Riding Hood and One Ham's Family), Billy Bletcher (The Screwy Truant), Patrick McGeehan (The Screwy Truant and Wild and Woolfy), Tex Avery (Wild and Woolfy), Daws Butler (Little Rural Riding Hood), Manuel Paris (Caballero Droopy), Frank Welker (The Tom and Jerry Comedy Show, Tom & Jerry Kids, Droopy Master Detective), Lou Scheimer (The Tom and Jerry Comedy Show), Will Ryan (Thanks a Latte), Dave Redl (Web Premiere Toons), John DiMaggio (Tom and Jerry: Robin Hood and His Merry Mouse) and Stephen Stanton (The Tom and Jerry Show).

The Wolf's actual name has varied over time. It was seldom given in the 1940s, but a 1945 studio announcement called him Wally Wolf. In modern-day appearances, the Wolf's name is often given as Slick Wolf or McWolf.

The Avery Wolf was referenced in the film The Mask (1994), when Stanley/The Mask (performed by Jim Carrey) briefly transforms into him while watching Tina Carlyle perform in a Red Hot Riding Hood-like performance, howling and whistling at her and then banging his head with a mallet. The Mask also changes into his wolf-like form on occasion in the spin-off animated series of the same name, particularly in the animated crossover featuring Ace Ventura: Pet Detective.

=== Featured shorts ===
No.	Title	Released	Notes
1	Blitz Wolf	August 22, 1942	Oscar nominee. The Wolf's debut.
2	Dumb-Hounded	March 20, 1943	First time paired with Droopy.
3	Red Hot Riding Hood	May 8, 1943	First time paired with Red. Ranked as #7 of The 50 Greatest Cartoons list.
4	One Ham's Family	August 14, 1943	
5	The Screwy Truant	January 13, 1945	Cameo appearance.
6	The Shooting of Dan McGoo	March 3, 1945	First time paired with Droopy and Red.
7	Swing Shift Cinderella	August 25, 1945	
8	Wild and Woolfy	November 3, 1945	
9	Lonesome Lenny	March 9, 1946	Cameo appearance.
10	Northwest Hounded Police	August 3, 1946	Remake. Ranked as #28 of The 50 Greatest Cartoons list.
11	Hound Hunters	April 12, 1947	Cameo appearance.
12	Señor Droopy	April 9, 1949	Non-speaking appearance.
13	Little Rural Riding Hood	September 17, 1949	Ranked as #23 of The 50 Greatest Cartoons list. Final appearance alongside Red.
14	Caballero Droopy	September 27, 1952	
