= 1943 in animation =

Events in 1943 in animation.

== Events ==
=== January ===
- January 1: Jack Kinney's war-time propaganda Donald Duck cartoon Der Fuehrer's Face, produced by Walt Disney Animation Studios, is first released.
- January 4: Bill Justice and Bill Roberts' war-time propaganda cartoon The Grain That Built a Hemisphere premieres, produced by Walt Disney Animation Studios.
- January 7: Jack King's war-time propaganda cartoon The Spirit of '43 premieres, produced by the Walt Disney Animation Studios, in which Donald Duck promotes paying income taxes to help the war effort.
- January 15: Clyde Geronimi's war-time propaganda cartoon Education for Death, produced by the Walt Disney Animation Studios, premieres.
- January 16:
  - Bob Clampett's Coal Black and de Sebben Dwarfs, produced by Leon Schlesinger Productions, is first released.
  - Hanna-Barbera's Tom and Jerry cartoon Sufferin' Cats! premieres, produced by MGM's Cartoon Studio and marks the debut of the alley cat Meathead.
- January 22: The war-time propaganda Popeye cartoon Spinach Fer Britain, directed by Isadore Sparber, produced by Famous Studios, premieres, in which Popeye fights Nazi marines.
- January 23: Norman McCabe's Porky Pig cartoon Confusions of a Nutzy Spy, a war-time propaganda cartoon produced by Leon Schlesinger Productions, is first released.
- January 29: Dick Lundy's Donald Duck short Donald's Tire Trouble premieres, produced by Walt Disney Animation Studios. While not directly referencing World War II it does mention rationing.

=== February ===
- February 2: Friz Freleng's Pigs in a Polka, produced by Leon Schlesinger Productions, is first seen in theaters.
- February 19: The war-time propaganda Popeye cartoon Seein' Red, White 'N' Blue, directed by Dan Gordon, produced by Famous Studios, premieres, in which Popeye and Bluto fight Japanese spies. Hirohito, Adolf Hitler and Hermann Göring have cameos too.
- February 20: Bob Clampett's Bugs Bunny cartoon Tortoise Wins by a Hare premieres, produced by Leon Schlesinger Productions and also starring Cecil Turtle. It is the sequel to Tex Avery's Tortoise Beats Hare (1941).

=== March ===
- March 4: 15th Academy Awards: Der Fuehrer's Face, produced by Walt Disney Animation Studios, wins the Academy Award for Best Animated Short Film.
- March 6:
  - Friz Freleng's The Fifth-Column Mouse is first released, a war-time propaganda cartoon produced by Leon Schlesinger Productions.
  - Chuck Jones' To Duck or Not to Duck premieres, produced by Leon Schlesinger Productions which stars Elmer Fudd and Daffy Duck eventually fighting it out in a boxing ring.
- March 12: Dick Lundy's Donald Duck cartoon The Flying Jalopy premieres, produced by Walt Disney Animation Studios.
- March 20: Tex Avery's Dumb-Hounded, produced by MGM's Cartoon Studio and marking the debut of Droopy, premieres. Also starring Slick McWolf.
- March 25: The Japanese war-time propaganda short Momotarō no Umiwashi is first released.
- March 26: The Superman war-time propaganda short, Jungle Drums, produced by Famous Studios, has Superman fighting Nazis, with a caricature of Adolf Hitler appearing at the end.

=== April ===
- April 2: Clyde Geronimi's Pluto cartoon Private Pluto, produced by Walt Disney Animation Studios, premieres. It marks the debut of Chip 'n' Dale.
- April 3: Chuck Jones' Bugs Bunny cartoon Super-Rabbit premieres, produced by Leon Schlesinger Productions.
- April 15: Kenzo Masaoka's Kumo to Tulip is first released.
- April 23: Jack King's war-time propaganda Donald Duck cartoon Fall Out Fall In, produced by the Walt Disney Animation Studios, premieres.

=== May ===
- May 1: Bob Clampett's Daffy Duck short The Wise Quacking Duck premieres, produced by Leon Schlesinger Productions.
- May 8: Tex Avery's Red Hot Riding Hood premieres, produced by MGM's Cartoon Studio, starring Slick McWolf and Red (in which the latter makes her debut in).
- May 15: Norman McCabe's war-time propaganda cartoon Tokio Jokio premieres, produced by Leon Schlesinger Productions. It is his last picture for the studio before his enlistment in the Army.
- May 22: William Hanna and Joseph Barbera's Tom and Jerry cartoon The Lonesome Mouse premieres, produced by MGM's Cartoon Studio and also stars Mammy Two Shoes. This short is known for having the titular cat and mouse speak for the first time. It features a moment where Jerry draws Adolf Hitler's hair and moustache on a picture of Tom.

=== June ===
- June 5: Friz Freleng's Daffy Duck and Porky Pig cartoon Yankee Doodle Daffy, produced by Leon Schlesinger Productions is first released.
- June 12: Friz Freleng's Bugs Bunny cartoon Jack-Wabbit and the Beanstalk premieres, produced by Leon Schlesinger Productions.
- June 19:
  - Tex Avery's Who Killed Who? premieres, produced by MGM's Cartoon Studio.
  - Chuck Jones' cartoon The Aristo-Cat produced by produced by Leon Schlesinger Productions. This short marks the debut of the characters Claude Cat & Hubie and Bertie.
- June 26: Hanna-Barbera's Tom and Jerry cartoon The Yankee Doodle Mouse premieres, produced by MGM's Cartoon Studio. While not directly referencing World War II, much of their fight mirrors a military battle, making it a war-time propaganda short. This was the first cartoon in the series to win an Academy Award for Best animated short film.
- June 28: Leon Schlesinger Productions starts producing the Private Snafu wartime propaganda military instruction cartoons, of which the first entry in the series is Coming!! Snafu.

=== July ===
- July 3: Chuck Jones' Bugs Bunny cartoon Wackiki Wabbit, produced by Leon Schlesinger Productions, is first released.
- July 17:
  - Frank Tashlin's Daffy Duck and Porky Pig cartoon Porky Pig's Feat, produced by Leon Schlesinger Productions, is first released, It's the first cartoon in the Looney Tunes series to use "Powerhouse", and the first time Bugs Bunny appears onscreen with Daffy.
  - Bob Clampett's Tin Pan Alley Cats, produced by Leon Schlesinger Productions, is first released.
  - H.C. Potter's live-action war-time propaganda film Victory Through Air Power, which features animated scenes directed by James Algar, Clyde Geronimi and Jack Kinney, produced by Walt Disney Animation Studios, is first released. It also marks more focus by Disney on producing educational animated films.

=== August ===
- August 14: Tex Avery's One Ham's Family premieres, produced by MGM's Cartoon Studio and stars Slick McWolf.
- August 21: Frank Tashlin's war-time propaganda Daffy Duck cartoon Scrap Happy Daffy premieres, produced by Leon Schlesinger Productions.
- August 28: Bill Roberts' war-time propaganda short Reason and Emotion, produced by Walt Disney Animation Studios, premieres.

=== September ===
- September 25: Bob Clampett's cartoon A Corny Concerto, produced by Leon Schlesinger Productions, is first released. It stars Elmer Fudd, Porky Pig, Bugs Bunny, and Daffy Duck (as a duckling). It's also notable for being a parody of Disney's Fantasia.

=== October ===
- October 9: Hanna-Barbera's war-time propaganda short War Dogs, produced by MGM's Cartoon Studio, premieres.
- October 30:
  - Bob Clampett's Bugs Bunny cartoon Falling Hare premieres, produced by Leon Schlesinger Productions in which Bugs fights a Gremlin.
  - Hanna-Barbera's Tom and Jerry cartoon Baby Puss premieres, produced by MGM's Cartoon Studio in which Tom's cat friends Butch and Topsy make their debut. Also starring Meathead.

=== November ===
- November 5: Jack King's war-time propaganda Donald Duck cartoon The Old Army Game premieres, produced by Walt Disney Animation Studios. Also starring Pete.
- November 20: Friz Freleng's war-time propaganda cartoon Daffy - The Commando is first released, produced by Leon Schlesinger Productions. In the cartoon Daffy Duck outsmarts a Nazi officer and memorably hits Adolf Hitler on the head with a mallet.
- November 27: Tex Avery's What's Buzzin' Buzzard premieres, produced by MGM's Cartoon Studio.

=== December ===
- December 18: Clyde Geronimi's Chicken Little, produced by Walt Disney Animation Studios is first released.
- December 28: The Donald Duck war-time propaganda short Home Defense, directed by Jack King and produced by Walt Disney Animation Studios, premieres. Also starring Huey, Dewey, and Louie.

== Films released ==
- July 17 - Victory Through Air Power (United States)

== Births ==
=== January ===
- January 1: Don Novello, American actor, comedian, singer, writer, film director and producer (voice of Leonardo da Vinci in Histeria!, Vinny Santorini in Atlantis: The Lost Empire and Atlantis: Milo's Return, Inmate in the Clone High episode "Litter Kills: Litterally").
- January 3: Van Dyke Parks, American musician, songwriter, arranger, record producer and composer (The Brave Little Toaster, Harold and the Purple Crayon, Stuart Little).
- January 13: Richard Moll, American actor (voice of Two-Face in the DC Animated Universe and the Batman: The Brave and the Bold episode "Chill of the Night!", Norman in Mighty Max, Abomination in The Incredible Hulk, Scorpion in Spider-Man, Vorn the Unspeakable in the Freakazoid! episode "Statuesque", Org's Dad in The Wacky Adventures of Ronald McDonald episode "The Visitors from Outer Space", Rodin Krick in The Zeta Project episode "Lost and Found", Dinky in the Happily Ever After: Fairy Tales for Every Child episode "The Pied Piper", Emperor Spooj in the Superman: The Animated Series episode "The Main Man"), (d. 2023).
- January 14: Holland Taylor, American actress (voice of Prudence in the Cinderella franchise, Mrs. Cornwall in the Fillmore! episode "A Cold Day at X", Mrs. Dawson in the American Dad! episode "Big Trouble in Little Langley", Madame Gummery in the Spirit Riding Free episode "Lucky and the New Frontier", Goldie in The Great North episode "As Goldie as It Gets Adventure").
- January 18: Peter Angelis, English actor (voice of George Harrison, Ringo Starr, and the Chief Blue Meanie in Yellow Submarine), (d. 2009).
- January 23: Gil Gerard, American actor (voice of Megatronus/The Fallen in Transformers: Robots in Disguise), (d. 2025).

=== February ===
- February 2: Gay Autterson, American actress (voice of Betty Rubble from 1971 to 1981).
- February 3: Blythe Danner, American actress (voice of Madam Suliman in Howl's Moving Castle, Sylvia Jones in Ridley Jones).
- February 25:
  - George Harrison, English musician, singer-songwriter and member of The Beatles (voiced himself in The Simpsons episode "Homer's Barbershop Quartet"), (d. 2001).
  - Stanislav Holý, Czech graphic artist, caricaturist, animation designer, children's book illustrator and animator (Mr. Pip), (d. 1998).
- February 27: Gary Conrad, American animator (A Garfield Christmas Special, This Is America, Charlie Brown, Garfield's Babes and Bullets), storyboard artist (Bobby's World), sheet timer (The Fairly OddParents, Danny Phantom, Big City Greens), writer (The Fairly OddParents), producer (Bobby's World) and director (Bobby's World, Nickelodeon Animation Studio).
- February 28: Richard Romanus, American actor (voice of Weehawk in Wizards, Harry Canyon in Heavy Metal, Vinnie in Hey Good Lookin'), (d. 2023).

=== March ===
- March 5: G.G. Santiago, American animator (Rainbow Brite and the Star Stealer), (d. 2026).
- March 12: Ed Scharlach, American television producer and writer (Duckman, The Wild Thornberrys, Invader Zim, Warner Bros. Animation, The Emperor's New School).
- March 28: Conchata Ferrell, American actress (voice of Roxanne in Duckman, Bob's Mom in Frankenweenie, Ma Munchapper in Buzz Lightyear of Star Command, Dr. Greer in The Zeta Project episode "The Next Gen", Miss Effluvium in the Lloyd in Space episode "Incident at Luna Vista"), (d. 2020).
- March 29: Eric Idle, English actor, comedian and singer (voice of Wreck-Gar in The Transformers: The Movie, Evil Martin in The Secret of NIMH 2: Timmy to the Rescue, Devon in Quest for Camelot, Slyly in Rudolph the Red-Nosed Reindeer: The Movie, Dr. Vosnocker in South Park: Bigger, Longer and Uncut, Merlin in Shrek the Third, Mr. Parentheses in Hercules, Pluto Angel in House of Mouse, Declan Desmond in The Simpsons, Galileo in Recess, Scrapperton in Super Robot Monkey Team Hyperforce Go!, Pinky's Parents in the Pinky and the Brain episode "The Family That Poits Together, Narfs Together").
- March 31: Christopher Walken, American actor (voice of Colonel Cutter in Antz, King Louie in The Jungle Book).

=== April ===
- April 6: Susan Tolsky, American actress (voice of Aunt Ruth in Bobby's World, Binkie Muddlefoot in Darkwing Duck, Aunt Janie in Pepper Ann, Mrs. Pesky in The Buzz on Maggie), (d. 2022).
- April 10: Tom Pollock, American studio executive and film producer (Alienators: Evolution Continues), (d. 2020).
- April 16: Ruth Madoc, English actress (voice of Whale in the Tinga Tinga Tales episode "Why Whale Spouts"), (d. 2022).

=== May ===
- May 5: Michael Palin, English actor, comedian, writer, television presenter, and public speaker (voice of Rat in The Wind in the Willows, Gariiiiiii/Gary in Robbie the Reindeer, Ernie Clicker in Arthur Christmas, narrator in Clangers, Museum Curator in The Simpsons episode "I, Carumbus").
- May 13: Frederic Parke, American computer graphics researcher and academic (A Computer Animated Hand).
- May 16: Dominique Benicheti, French film director and producer, (d. 2011).
- May 27:
  - Diane Pershing, American actress (voice of Poison Ivy in the DC Animated Universe, Isis in The Freedom Force, Pearl Pureheart in The New Adventures of Mighty Mouse and Heckle & Jeckle, Dale Arden in The New Adventures of Flash Gordon, Crystal Kane in The Centurions, Netossa and Spinnerella in She-Ra: Princess of Power, additional voices in The Smurfs, Saber Rider and the Star Sheriffs, and Dungeons & Dragons).
  - Bruce Weitz, American actor (voice of Bruno Mannheim in Superman: The Animated Series, Lock-Up in the Batman: The Animated Series episode "Lock-Up").
- May 28: Jacques Drouin, Canadian animator and director (National Film Board of Canada), (d. 2021).
- May 31: Joe Namath, American former football quarterback (voiced himself in The Simpsons episodes "Bart Star" and "Four Regrettings and a Funeral").

=== June ===
- June 2: Charles Haid, American actor (voice of Lucky Jack in Home on the Range).
- June 13: Malcolm McDowell, English actor (voice of Metallo in the DC Animated Universe, Abraham Whistler in Spider-Man, Mad Mod in Teen Titans, Dr. Calico in Bolt, Vater Orlaag in Metalocalypse, Reginald Fletcher in Phineas and Ferb, Lord Fathom in Jake and the Never Land Pirates, Professor Lampwick in We Bare Bears, Varney in Castlevania, Minister Hydan in Star Wars Rebels, Baron Von Ghoulish in The Grim Adventures of Billy & Mandy episode "Billy and Mandy Save Christmas", Arkady Duvall in the Batman: The Animated Series episode "Showdown", Percival Rockhound in the SpongeBob SquarePants episode "Pet the Rock", himself in the Scooby-Doo and Guess Who? episode "A Run Cycle Through Time!").
- June 16: Joan Van Ark, American actress (voice of Spider-Woman in Spider-Woman, Ruth in the Archer episode "Placebo Effect").
- June 17:
  - Peter Orton, English media entrepreneur and television producer (HiT Entertainment), (d. 2007).
  - Barry Manilow, American singer and songwriter (Oliver & Company, Thumbelina, The Pebble and the Penguin, voiced himself in the Family Guy episode "Back to the Woods", narrator in Cranberry Christmas).
- June 23: James Levine, American conductor (Fantasia 2000), (d. 2021).

=== July ===
- July 3: Kurtwood Smith, American actor (voice of Gene in Regular Show, Agent Bennet in The Zeta Project, Kanjar Ro in Green Lantern: First Flight, Agent H in Men in Black: The Series, Robert Johnson in Squirrel Boy, Mr. Wheelie in Robot and Monster, Jim Gordon in Beware the Batman, Angry Old Raisin in Pig Goat Banana Cricket, Shyir Rev in the Green Lantern: The Animated Series episode "Beware My Power", General Nathan in the Rick and Morty episode "Get Schwifty").
- July 5: David Matalon, American studio executive (TriStar Pictures, Regency Enterprises), (d. 2025).
- July 11: Suzan Pitt, American animator (Asparagus), (d. 2019).
- July 12: Walter Murch, American film editor, director, (Return to Oz, the Star Wars: The Clone Wars episode "The General"), writer (Return to Oz), and sound designer.
- July 20: John Lodge, English musician (voiced himself in The Simpsons episode "Viva Ned Flanders"), (d. 2025).
- July 24: John Bryson, American politician and former director of The Walt Disney Company, (d. 2025).
- July 31: Ryan Larkin, Canadian animator (Walking, Street Musique) (d. 2007).

=== August ===
- August 6: Ray Buktenica, American actor (voice of Hugo Strange in the Batman: The Animated Series episode "The Strange Secret of Bruce Wayne").
- August 13:
  - Dell Hake, American conductor and orchestrator (The Powerpuff Girls Movie, The Simpsons), (d. 2017).
  - Pauline Newstone, Canadian actress (voice of Airazor in Beast Wars: Transformers, Frieza in the Ocean Productions dub of Dragon Ball Z, Agatha Harkness in X-Men: Evolution, Heka in Mummies Alive!), (d. 2023).
- August 17: Robert De Niro, American actor (voice of Don Lino in Shark Tale, Emperor Sifrat XVI in Arthur and the Invisibles).
- August 18: Martin Mull, American actor, comedian and musician (voice of Vlad Masters in Danny Phantom, Skip Binsford in Family Dog, Paul Prickly in Recess, Governor Kevin in Teamo Supremo, Father Donovan in American Dad!, Seth in The Simpsons episode "D'oh-in' in the Wind", Mr. Harris in the Family Guy episode "If I'm Dyin', I'm Lyin'", Dennis Tucker in The Wild Thornberrys episode "Birthday Quake", M.A.R. 10 in the Dexter's Laboratory episode "Lab on the Run", Shopkeeper in the Bob's Burgers episode "Local She-ro"), (d. 2024).
- August 20: Jim Self, American tubist and composer (Finding Nemo, Finding Dory, Cars, Cars 3, Planes, Beauty and the Beast, Aladdin, The Princess and the Frog, Batman: The Animated Series, Superman: The Animated Series, Mulan, The Little Mermaid), (d. 2025).

=== September ===
- September 8: Alvy Ray Smith, American computer scientist (co-founder of Pixar).
- September 16: Masami Suda, Japanese animator and character designer (Fist of the North Star, Slam Dunk, Speed Racer), (d. 2021).
- September 18: Gailard Sartain, American actor (voice of Case Manager in the King of the Hill pilot, Big Daddy in The Simpsons episode "The Simpsons Spin-Off Showcase", Big O in The Angry Beavers episode "Sqotters") and screenwriter (The Angry Beavers), (d. 2025).
- September 23: Cedric Smith, English-born Canadian actor (voice of Professor X in X-Men: The Animated Series and Spider-Man, A'lars in the Silver Surfer episode "Learning Curve").
- September 24: Randall Duk Kim, American actor (voice of Oogway in the Kung Fu Panda franchise).
- September 27: Enrico Bertorelli, Italian actor (dub voice of Cell and Commander Red in Dragon Ball Z, Jim Gordon in Batman: The Animated Series), (d. 2020).

=== October ===
- October 12: Katsue Miwa, Japanese voice actress (voice of Unico in the Unico franchise. Hiroshi in The Monster Kid, Miki in Acrobunch, Azusa Yamoto in Superbook, Lilo in One Piece, Orga in Phoenix 2772, Japanese dub voice of Dr. Ann Sinian in Swat Kats: The Radical Squadron, Lucy Van Pelt in the Peanuts franchise), (d. 2024).
- October 15: Penny Marshall, American actress, film director and producer (voice of Laverne DeFazio in Laverne & Shirley in the Army, Ms. Botz in The Simpsons episode "Some Enchanted Evening", The Elder in Scooby-Doo! and Kiss: Rock and Roll Mystery), (d. 2018).
- October 19: Rodger Parsons, American voice actor (voice of the Narrator in Pokémon).
- October 27: Michel Ocelot, French writer, designer, storyboard artist and director (Kirikou and the Sorceress).
- October 31: Melendy Britt, American actress (voice of Adora/She-Ra and Catra in She-Ra: Princess of Power, Penny and the Chief in The Plastic Man Comedy/Adventure Show, Princess Aura in The New Adventures of Flash Gordon, Batgirl and Catwoman in The New Adventures of Batman, Gran Gran in Avatar: The Last Airbender).

=== November ===
- November 12: Wallace Shawn, American actor (voice of Rex in the Toy Story franchise, The Little Man in The Pink Panther, Principal Mazur in A Goofy Movie, Bertram in Family Guy, Gilbert Huph in The Incredibles, Crosby Stickler in Teacher's Pet, Wally the White in OK K.O.! Let's Be Heroes, Humphrey Westwood in Amphibia).
- November 14:
  - Michèle Cournoyer, Canadian animator.
  - Michael Yama, American actor (voice of Torpedo in G.I. Joe: A Real American Hero, Ancient One in Doctor Strange: The Sorcerer Supreme, Cain in Todd McFarlane's Spawn, Shyu in the Avatar: The Last Airbender, episode "Winter Solstice, Part 2: Avatar Roku", Otaku in the Spicy City episode Love is a Download", Oni in the Rocket Power episode "Tito-Thon", additional voices in The Invincible Iron Man), (d. 2020).
- November 16:
  - Wai Ching Ho, Hong Kong actress (voice of Grandma Wu in Turning Red), (d. 2026).
  - Bob Foster, American animator, storyboard artist, comics writer, editor (worked for Filmation, Hanna-Barbera, DePatie-Freleng, Marvel Animation and on Mickey Mouse Clubhouse, My Friends Tigger and Pooh) and president of The Animation Guild, (d. 2024).
- November 18: Osamu Dezaki, Japanese film director, producer (co-founder of Madhouse) and screenwriter, (d. 2011).
- November 28: Randy Newman, American singer-songwriter, arranger, composer, and pianist (Pixar).

=== December ===
- December 12: Buster Jones, American actor (voice of Black Vulcan in Super Friends, Doc in G.I. Joe: A Real American Hero, Blaster in The Transformers, Winston Zeddemore in seasons 4-7 of The Real Ghostbusters, and Extreme Ghostbusters), (d. 2014).
- December 14: Britt Allcroft, English writer, producer, director and voice actress (creator of Thomas and Friends and Magic Adventures of Mumfie), (d. 2024).
- December 16: Patti Deutsch, American actress and comedian (voice of Mata in The Emperor's New Groove franchise, Tantor's mother in Tarzan, Mrs. Dave in As Told by Ginger, Lucy-2 in Jetsons: The Movie), (d. 2017).
- December 23:
  - Harry Shearer, American actor, comedian, writer (The Simpsons), musician, radio host, director, producer and member of Spinal Tap (voice of Keen Hacksaw, Mayor of Animalympic Island, Burnt Woody and Mark Spritz in Animalympics, Mr. Burns, Waylon Smithers, Ned Flanders, Dr. Hibbert, Reverend Lovejoy, Seymour Skinner, Kent Brockman and other various characters in The Simpsons, Punch-It in Small Soldiers, Dog Announcer in Chicken Little, Ned Flat in the Animaniacs episode "Fair Game", Matthew Burke in the Quack Pack episode "Ducky Dearest", himself in the Dr. Katz, Professional Therapist episode "Feng Shui", announcer for Cartoon Network).
  - Elizabeth Hartman, American actress (voice of Mrs. Brisby in The Secret of NIMH), (d. 1987).
- December 24: Kazuo Komatsubara, Japanese animator, character designer and director (Toei Animation, Oh! Production), (d. 2000).
- December 29: Jürgen Kluckert, German actor (German dub voice of Mr. Krabs in SpongeBob SquarePants, The King in Cinderella II: Dreams Come True and Cinderella III: A Twist in Time, Scuttle in The Little Mermaid, Genie in Aladdin, Mr. Swackhammer in Space Jam, Vladimir in Anastasia, Finis Everglot in Corpse Bride, Doctor Robotnik in Sonic Underground, King Dedede in Kirby: Right Back at Ya!), (d. 2023).
- December 31:
  - Ben Kingsley, English actor (voice of the title character in Freddie as F.R.O.7, General Woundwort in Watership Down, Archibald Snatcher in The Boxtrolls, Bagheera in The Jungle Book).
  - Victor Raider-Wexler, American actor (voice of Ray in American Dad!, Vendel in the Tales of Arcadia franchise, Frederic Estes in The Boss Baby: Back in Business, Yin Des Neerg in the Legion of Super Heroes episode "Cry Wolf").

=== Specific date unknown ===
- John Canemaker, American independent animator, animator historian, author, teacher and lecturer (The Moon and the Son: An Imagined Conversation).

== Deaths ==
=== December ===
- December 1: Julienne Mathieu, French actress, screenwriter, and special effects artist, (acted in the silent film Hôtel électrique, one of the first films to incorporate stop motion animation; she was a specialist in the use of stop-motion animation, pixilation, overprinting, dissolving, and the tracking shot for special effects), dies at age 69.

=== Specific date unknown ===
- Graystone Bird, English photographer, (much of Bird's most notable work, created during a peak period of his career in the 1890s and very early 1900s, involved creating pictorialist-style photographic images for publication-and-use as magic lantern slides. This was, at the time, a popular form of entertainment in private homes and public shows), dies at age 80-81.

== See also ==
- List of anime by release date (1939–1945)
