= Wolf-whistling =

Distinct sound used to show interest with an attractive person

Wolf whistle
A quiet wolf whistle.

A wolf whistle is a distinctive two-note glissando whistled sound made to show high interest in or approval of something or someone (usually a woman), especially at someone viewed as physically or sexually attractive. A modern wolf whistle directed at a person is sometimes considered a precursor to sexual harassment, or a form of sexual harassment in itself.

The name comes from Slick McWolf, a character created by Tex Avery for Metro-Goldwyn-Mayer, who frequently sexually harasses Red Hot Riding Hood by whistling in vain attempts to seduce her in the cartoon of the same name. The term appears in North American newspapers as early as 1943. It appears in British newspapers from 1949 onwards.

According to Adam Edwards of Daily Express, the wolf whistle originates from the navy General Call made with a boatswain's pipe. The General Call is made on a ship to get the attention of all hands for an announcement. Sailors in harbour would whistle the General Call upon seeing an attractive woman to draw fellow sailors' attention to her. It was eventually picked up by passers-by, not knowing the real meaning of the whistle, and passed on. During a 2015 broadcast of A Way with Words, doubt was cast upon this explanation by lexicographer Grant Barrett, who noted that it was very thinly supported. The Turn To Call is far closer to the wolf whistle than the General Call.

== See also ==
- Cat-calling
