= Dangerous Dan McFoo =

1939 film by Fred Avery

- Directed by: Fred Avery
- Story by: Rich Hogan
- Based on: "The Shooting of Dan McGrew" by Robert W. Service
- Produced by: Leon Schlesinger
- Starring: Mel Blanc; Robert C. Bruce; Arthur Q. Bryan; Sara Berner; (all uncredited)
- Music by: Carl W. Stalling
- Animation by: Paul Smith
- Color process: Technicolor
- Production company: Leon Schlesinger Productions
- Distributed by: Warner Bros. Pictures
- Release date: July 15, 1939
- Running time: 8 min
- Country: United States
- Language: English

Dangerous Dan McFoo is a 1939 American animated comedy short film directed by Fred Avery. The title is based on Robert W. Service's 1907 poem "The Shooting of Dan McGrew". The short was released on July 15, 1939. It is part of the Merrie Melodies series and the first to star Arthur Q. Bryan, who would become a fixture in the series by voicing Elmer Fudd. It was re-released as a "Blue Ribbon" reissue in 1948, rendering the original film and credits lost. After moving to Metro-Goldwyn-Mayer, Avery directed a spiritual successor starring Droopy in 1945, titled The Shooting of Dan McGoo.

== Plot ==
At the Malibu Saloon, numerous dogs sing and play music. Dan McFoo plays pinball and stretches the spring launcher as far as it can go, but nevertheless does not score. A villain enters and sees Dan's love interest, Sue, and is instantly smitten with the Bette Davis lookalike; she tells the villain in the voice (and catchphrase) of Katharine Hepburn: "I hope Dan mows you down, really I do."

A boxing match ensues, and a streetcar plunges into the saloon through the swinging doors, the conductor ringing its bell at the start of each round. Dan is able to dodge most of the villain's blows for most of round 1. In round 2, after getting a shave and a haircut, the villain gains the upper hand by using him as a punching bag, knocking Dan unconscious. When Dan's ghost revives him with a bucket of water, Dan accuses the villain of cheating; four horseshoes – and a horse – are found in his boxing glove. In round 3, now with a blow-by-blow commentator and freeze-frame shot analysis, Dan goes on the offensive, but the fight remains evenly matched; the narrator then gives the combatants pistols to duel and finish the fight once and for all. The lights go out and shots are fired. The two are seemingly shot dead, but Dan is revived and wins the match.

== Home media ==
- VHS – The Golden Age of Looney Tunes, Vol. 3: Tex Avery (unrestored)
- Laserdisc – The Golden Age of Looney Tunes, Volume 1, Side 3 (unrestored)
- DVD – Dodge City (USA 1995 dubbed print included as a bonus)
- Blu-Ray – Dodge City (USA 1995 dubbed print included as a bonus)
- Blu-Ray – Looney Tunes Collector's Choice: Volume 4 (restored)

== Notes ==
- Six years later, Avery would direct a similar cartoon for Metro-Goldwyn-Mayer called The Shooting of Dan McGoo. This short stars Droopy.
- Arthur Q. Bryan voiced Dan McFoo, Mel Blanc voiced the Stranger, Sara Berner voiced Sue, Robert C. Bruce voiced the Narrator, the Referee, and the Dog with the Cigarette, and The Sportsmen Quartet voiced The Three Singing Dogs.
- This cartoon was re-released into the Blue Ribbon Merrie Melodies program on January 30, 1948.
- This cartoon is notable for being the first to be re-released in the Blue Ribbon Merrie Melodies program with custom letter font titles. Also, this cartoon is notable for first using the voice that would later be associated with the Looney Tunes character, Elmer Fudd.
- A chorus in the bar at the start performs an excerpt from When I Saw Sweet Nellie Home.
- The work had its copyright renewed in 1967 and it will be under copyright until January 1, 2035. (Note: Under R413288)
