= Doggone Tired =

- Film poster
- Directed by: Tex Avery
- Story by: Rich Hogan; Jack Cosgriff
- Produced by: Fred Quimby
- Starring: Tex Avery; Patrick McGeehan; Sara Berner
- Music by: Scott Bradley
- Animation by: Robert Cannon; Michael Lah; Grant Simmons; Walter Clinton
- Color process: Technicolor
- Production company: MGM Cartoons
- Distributed by: Metro-Goldwyn-Mayer
- Release dates: July 30, 1949; April 6, 1956 (rereleased)
- Running time: 7:35
- Language: English

Doggone Tired is a 1949 cartoon short directed by Tex Avery. Doggone Tired is one of three MGM cartoons currently in the public domain in the United States.

== Plot ==
The short from 1949, restored.

Later that night, on the Out in Happy Hunting Lodge, Speedy the dog is brought to a cabin in the woods by his owner to hunt rabbits. Despite his eagerness, Speedy is told by his owner that it's too late to go hunting and to come inside to get some sleep.

The rabbit comes out of the hole and overhears the owner telling Speedy that he needs a good sleep to hunt the rabbit, so the rabbit harasses Speedy throughout the night to keep him awake.

Despite Speedy stopping each plot by the rabbit, he continues to not get sleep. After keeping Speedy up all night, the rabbit also is tired in the morning. Speedy's owner attempts to get him to hunt the rabbit, but Speedy is unable to due to his tiredness. In the end, Speedy and the rabbit both end up sleeping in the rabbit's nest. When the rabbit asked Speedy to blow out the candle, it turns out that the candle exploded right in Speedy's mouth.

== Credits ==
- Director: Tex Avery
- Story: Rich Hogan, Jack Cosgriff
- Animation: Robert Cannon, Michael Lah, Grant Simmons, Walter Clinton
- Music: Scott Bradley
- Producer: Fred Quimby

== Voice cast ==
- Patrick McGeehan as The Hunter
- Tex Avery (along with William Hanna and Billy Bletcher) as Speedy (vocal noises)
- Sara Berner as The Telephone Operator (sped-up)

== Release ==
The short was played in front of various different films during its initial release including The Red Danube and Come to the Stable. During its 1956 re-release, the short played in front of Ransom! and The Swan. As part of the public domain, the short can easily be found online and in various collections including the Tex Avery Screwball Classics Volume 2.

== Legacy ==
=== Appearances in other media ===
The video for "Again" by Lenny Kravitz features the short playing on a television at the beginning of the music video.

== See also ==
- To Spring (1936)
- Jerky Turkey (1945)
