= Mary Kate McGeehan =

American actress

- Other names: Kate McGeehan, Mary Kathleen McGeehan-Hatch
- Occupation: Actress
- Years active: 1981–2012
- Spouse: Kerry Hatch
- Children: 1

Mary Kate McGeehan is an American actress. Her acting career has spanned several decades and she has appeared in a number of TV productions throughout the 1980s, 90s and 2000s into the 2010s. She is the daughter of American actor Patrick McGeehan and Lawrence Welk biographer Bernice McGeehan.

== Career ==
She is best known to television viewers for her role as Linda Gioberti (originally Linda Caproni) in the 1980s prime-time drama series Falcon Crest. She appeared in the series from 1982 to 1984, when her character was killed in a plane crash. McGeehan read for a small role at Lorimar that led to being added to the cast as a regular. Prior to her work on Falcon Crest, she played a nurse extra for several years on General Hospital.

In the mid-80s, she also appeared in the highly successful American sci-fi-action-adventure TV series Knight Rider, starring as "Jennifer Knight" in the episode titled "Knight of the Juggernaut" from 1985.

She worked as the dialogue coach for Dylan Sprouse and Cole Sprouse following the 2004 pilot of the Disney Channel's The Suite Life of Zack and Cody (2005). She is also on the staff at Gary Spatz's The Playground - A Young Actors Conservatory (2006).

She and her writing partner, Susan Shaughnessy, won 5th place in the American Screenwriters Association International Screenplay Competition, for their black comedy script, "Bearded Ladies" (May 2005).

== Patent ==
In 1994, she filed for a patent for an apparatus to allow for easier scenery changes, specifically intended for decorating children's rooms. The patent was granted on June 4, 1996.

== Selected TV credits ==
- Falcon Crest (as Linda Caproni, Linda Gioberti)
- Fantasy Island
- The A-Team
- Thicke of the Night
- Knight Rider (as Jennifer Knight)
- Simon and Simon
- Magnum P.I.
- Remington Steele
- The Love Boat
- Hotel
- Airwolf
- Murder, She Wrote
- Voyagers!
- The Renegades
- Houston Knights (as Andrea Webber)
- Beverly Hills, 90210
- The Suite Life on Deck
- Smart Guy
- The Suite Life of Zack & Cody
- Mike & Molly

== Filmography ==
- Danielle Steel's Full Circle (1996)

== Personal life ==
She married Kerry Hatch of Oingo Boingo in September 1984. In 2016, Kerry Hatch filed for divorce, but the case was dismissed.
