= Dixieland Droopy =

1954 film by Tex Avery

- Directed by: Tex Avery
- Story by: Heck Allen
- Produced by: Fred Quimby
- Starring: Bill Thompson; John Brown; Tex Avery
- Narrated by: John Brown
- Music by: Scott Bradley
- Animation by: Walt Clinton; Michael Lah; Grant Simmons
- Backgrounds by: Joe Montell
- Color process: Technicolor
- Production company: MGM Cartoons
- Distributed by: Metro-Goldwyn-Mayer
- Release date: December 4, 1954
- Running time: 7 minutes 44 seconds
- Country: United States
- Language: English

Dixieland Droopy is a 1954 animated short subject in the Droopy series, directed by Tex Avery and produced by Fred Quimby for Metro-Goldwyn-Mayer.

The soundtrack version of this cartoon without dialogue as part of Tom and Jerry and Tex Avery Too!: Volume 1: The 1950s soundtrack album by Scott Bradley Disc 1, 9th track in 2006.

== Plot summary ==
An unseen narrator (in a voice by John Brown imitating Pee Wee Hunt) tells the story of a Dixieland-music-loving dog named John Pettybone (Droopy, voice of Bill Thompson). Pettybone's one love is listening to a record of Dixieland jazz, specifically "Tiger Rag", and pretending to conduct the music. Unfortunately, the manager of the dump where Pettybone lives is not a fan of Dixieland, and he evicts the hapless dog from the dump.

Pettybone travels to several locations (a cafe, an organ grinder, an ice cream truck and a merry-go-round) in an attempt to play his music, but is thrown out each time. Pettybone is heartbroken when his record is accidentally smashed, but his luck changes when he discovers a flea circus with a group of fleas called "Pee Wee Runt and his All-Flea Dixieland Band". He goes in the circus tent with its sign saying that dogs aren't allowed inside. As Pettybone hoped, the fleas choose to go with him and for him to be their conductor, but the flea circus owner is not pleased by Pettybone taking his fleas and demands them returned. Pettybone refuses to comply, and so is pursued by him throughout the city, with the fleas playing all the time (putting the fur of Pettybone's rear back on him after a meat market owner cuts it off, stopping when Pettybone slows and creeps quickly to go through a hospital zone and restarting by his command after doing so, slowing down as he is slowed by tar and even taking a smoke break).

The pursuit continues with the owner chasing Pettybone inside Jazza Plaza, where Pettybone ultimately escapes the owner by hiding inside a theatrical agent's office. The agent does not approve of dog acts, and demands for Pettybone to leave, but upon inadvertently starting up the flea band's music once again and hearing it, he mistakenly believes that Pettybone is making the music himself. Pettybone becomes famous as "John Pettybone, Dog of Mystery", and realizes his dream of playing the Hollywood Bowl.

As the cartoon concludes with a close-up of the flea circus band, the narrator states no one ever discovered the secret to Pettybone's music and never will. Because only Pee Wee Runt knew and would never tell as he, the trumpeter, Pee Wee Runt, reveals, "For you see, he - that flea, Pee Wee - is me! See?"

== Voice Cast ==
- Bill Thompson as John Irving Pettybone (Droopy)
- John Brown as The Narrator (Pee-Wee Runt) / The Theatrical Agent
- Tex Avery as The Flea Band Owner

== See also ==
- Pee Wee Erwin
- Pee Wee Hunt
