= Droopy's Tennis Open =

2002 video game

- Developers: Bit Managers; Warthog Games
- Publishers: Light & Shadow Production
- Platform: Game Boy Advance
- Release: PAL: October 18, 2002
- Genre: Tennis
- Modes: Single-player, multiplayer

Droopy's Tennis Open is a tennis video game developed by Bit Managers and published by Light & Shadow Production for the Game Boy Advance exclusively in Europe. The game is based on MGM Cartoons' Droopy animated franchise, and features several characters and locations from the series.

== Summary ==
Similarly to other tennis-based videogames, like Mario Tennis, the basic gameplay consists of traditional tennis matches. Each of the playable characters, including: Droopy, McWolf, Butch, Bubbles Vavoom, Dripple, and Screwy Squirrel have their own unique stats and strengths. The game includes six courts based on locations from the franchise, like the North Pole and Wild West.

The game includes Arcade, Tournament, and Multiplayer modes. Arcade Mode's "Cartoon" option allows players to distract and attack their opponent with traps, time bombs, multiple balls, a net, hammer rackets, steam rollers, springs, meteorite balls, and cages. The game's multiplayer allows for up to four players, via the Link Cable accessory and multi-card support.

== Reception ==
Reception

Aggregate score
Aggregator	Score
GameRankings	76%

Review score
Publication	Score
GamesMaster	72/100

The game received mixed-to-positive reviews. GamesMaster gave it a score of 72 out of 100, while EAGB Advance rated it four out of five stars.

== See also ==
- List of Tom and Jerry video games
