= Red Hot Riding Hood =

1943 American animated short film directed by Tex Avery

- Theatrical poster
- Directed by: Tex Avery
- Story by: Rich Hogan
- Produced by: Fred Quimby (uncredited)
- Starring: Frank Graham; Kent Rogers; Sara Berner; Elvia Allman; Connie Russell; Pinto Colvig; (all uncredited)
- Cinematography: Gene Moore
- Music by: Scott Bradley
- Animation by: Preston Blair; Ray Abrams; Ed Love; Irven Spence; (all uncredited)
- Backgrounds by: John Didrik Johnsen (uncredited)
- Color process: Technicolor
- Production company: Metro-Goldwyn-Mayer Cartoon Studio
- Distributed by: Loews Inc.
- Release date: May 8, 1943
- Running time: 7 minutes
- Country: United States
- Language: English

Red Hot Riding Hood is a 1943 American animated short film, directed by Tex Avery and released with the movie Dr. Gillespie's Criminal Case on May 8, 1943, by Metro-Goldwyn-Mayer. In 1994, it was voted number 7 of The 50 Greatest Cartoons of all time by members of the animation field, making it the highest ranked MGM cartoon on the list. It is one of Avery's most popular cartoons, inspiring several of his own "sequel" shorts as well as influencing other cartoons and feature films for years afterward.

== Plot ==
20-second excerpt from Red Hot Riding Hood, where the Wolf exaggeratedly ogles Red Hot Riding Hood

The story begins with a standard, narrated version of Little Red Riding Hood (with the wolf from Dumb-Hounded, the cartoon which saw the debut of Avery's Droopy). Little Red Riding Hood, the Big Bad Wolf, and Little Red Riding Hood's grandma rebel at this stale and derivative staging of the story and demand a fresh approach. The annoyed narrator accedes to their demands and starts the story again in a dramatically different arrangement.

The story begins again, now told in a contemporary urban setting. The narrator explains that Little Red Riding Hood (now portrayed as an adult) is an attractive performer in a Hollywood nightclub under the stage name "Red Hot Riding Hood", and the Big Bad Wolf, now a Hollywood swinger, follows Red to the club where she is performing. Red performs onstage (a rendition of the 1941 classic hit song "Daddy") and the wolf goes mad with desire. He brings her to his table and tries wooing her, but she wants nothing to do with him. Red escapes the Wolf, saying she is going to her Grandma's place, but nevertheless the Wolf manages to get there first. Grandma's place is a penthouse at the top of a 36-story skyscraper. Red's grandma is an oversexed man-chaser who falls head over heels for the Wolf.

The Wolf tries to escape, but Grandma blocks the exit and comes onto him. She locks the door, drops the key down the front of her evening gown, and poses provocatively for him. She dons a bright red shade of lipstick and a chase scene ensues. Whenever the Wolf attempts an exit, Grandma waits behind the door with puckered lips. He finally makes his escape by jumping out a window, severely injuring himself on the pavement many floors below.

He makes his way back to the nightclub, covered with bandages and bruises, swearing he is done with women and would kill himself before looking at another woman. Immediately, Red takes the stage and begins another performance. The Wolf pulls out two guns and commits suicide, but his ghost rises from his dead body and howls and whistles at Red as he did earlier.

== Voice cast ==
- Frank Graham as Narrator / The Wolf / Showroom Announcer / Cab Driver
  - Kent Rogers as Wolf (three lines - "What's your answer to that, babe?", "Hey, follow that cab" and "Grandma, control yourself.")
  - Pinto Colvig as Wolf howls
- Sara Berner as Red Hot Riding Hood / Cigarette Girls
  - Connie Russell as Red Hot Riding Hood (singing voice)
- Elvia Allman as Grandma

== Crew ==
- Directed by: Tex Avery
- Story: Rich Hogan
- Animation: Preston Blair, Ray Abrams, Ed Love, Irven Spence
- Character Design: Claude Smith
- Layout and Backgrounds: John Didrik Johnsen
- Camera: Gene Moore
- Film Editor: Fred McAlpin
- Sound Editor: Fred McAlpin
- Music: Scott Bradley
- Co-Producer: William Hanna
- Produced by: Fred Quimby

== Censorship ==
The element is the musical scene where Red performs and "Wolfie", as she calls him, reacts in a highly lustful fashion. Those reactions were considered so energetic that the censors at the time demanded cuts in this scene and others. Avery claimed that a censor made him edit out footage of the Wolf getting sexually aroused at the sight of Red performing. However, an army officer at Washington, D.C., then heard about the censored prints and asked Louis B. Mayer for uncut ones. The print was shown to military audiences overseas and went over great with them. Preston Blair, who animated Red, did not recall any cuts to the film, but did recall that the military went nuts over it.

=== Original Ending ===
The film's original conclusion had Grandma marrying the wolf at a shotgun wedding (with a caricature of Tex Avery as the Justice of the Peace who marries them), and having the unhappy couple and their half-human half-wolf children attend Red's show. The chase scene with Grandma and the Wolf ends in the completed film with him jumping out of a window. In the early script, the Wolf crawls back inside and explains that he is about to commit suicide. The chase continues and Red joins the two other characters. The Wolf is tied up and Grannie instructs Red to get a preacher. She then kisses the Wolf. The two get married at a shotgun wedding. The Wolf says "I do" with Red aiming an anti-aircraft gun at his back. The final scene takes place at a nightclub. Grannie and the Wolf attend a performance of Red. Three baby wolves at their table go wild over Red. This ending was indeed animated and stills of the wedding scene are included in the MGM photo library. The images were fully inked and painted.

Blair had his own censorship tale. According to him, the censor was dirty minded and thought the film promoted bestiality between a woman and a wolf. Blair was instructed to animate a new ending, where the wolf's face is torn off as a mask and he is revealed to be a man. He completed the additional footage, though disgusted with the unnecessary censorship. At the end, the studio never used this ending and Blair was unaware if the print survived.

This ending, deleted for reasons of implied bestiality and how it made light of marriage (something that was considered taboo by the Hays Office's Production Code), was replaced with one (that has also been edited, but only on television) where The Wolf is back at the nightclub and tells the audience he is done chasing women, and if he ever even looks at a woman again, he will kill himself. When Red soon appears onstage to perform again, the Wolf takes out two pistols and blasts himself in the head. The Wolf then drops dead, but his ghost appears and begins to howl and whistle at Red same as before.

A rumor surfaced at the 1992 Conference of the Society for Animation Studies, that there was another alternate ending. According to this rumor, Wolf married Red and had a baby with her. Blair declared there was no such sequence. Mark Kausler provided a copy of a continuity script that clarified that Wolf married Grandma and not Red.

== Follow-ups ==
- Avery made several follow-ups to the film, including Swing Shift Cinderella (1945), The Shooting of Dan McGoo and Wild and Woolfy (both 1945 and starring Droopy), Uncle Tom's Cabaña (1947), and Little Rural Riding Hood (1949) and The Hick Chick (1946, cameo as a nurse at the end of the cartoon). Red's voice actresses included Sara Berner, Imogene Lynn, and Ann Pickard.
- Red made a comeback in the Saturday morning cartoon series Tom & Jerry Kids and Droopy, Master Detective (voiced by Teresa Ganzel), given the name "Miss Vavoom" in the Droopy and Dripple shorts and "Mystery Lady" in Calaboose Cal. As in the original MGM cartoons, Red plays the "damsel in distress" while the Wolf (here known as "McWolf") and Droopy compete for her affections.
- Red appeared in several of the Tom and Jerry direct-to-video movies produced from 2010 to 2017, where Tom and Jerry crossed over with other Warner-owned properties. This included Tom and Jerry Meet Sherlock Holmes, Tom and Jerry: Robin Hood and His Merry Mouse, and Tom and Jerry's Giant Adventure (voiced by Grey DeLisle), where she was a primary character to the films' plots. The Wolf also made a few appearances, even becoming her groom in Meet Sherlock Holmes.
- The chase sequence through a Toontown hi-rise in the 1988 film Who Framed Roger Rabbit is heavily inspired by the Wolf/Grandma chase sequence in Red Hot Riding Hood, including several gags (ex: the door that opens to the outside of the building) directly lifted from the short. Author Gary K. Wolf based Jessica Rabbit primarily on Red.
- Red made a cameo appearance in the 1998 Warner Bros. animated film, Quest for Camelot, where she appeared briefly during the third verse of "If I Didn't Have You" with Cornwall, before she turned into Devon's head.
- The Coco Bongo scene in the 1994 film The Mask, was based on the cartoon, with the Mask, completely acting and sometimes looking like the wolf. The Mask bangs himself on the head with a mallet, and ends up dancing with Tina. Stanley Ipkiss also has a tape of this cartoon and watches it in his room.

== Distribution ==
- Tex Avery Screwball Classics: Volume 1 Blu-Ray and DVD (restored)
