= Patrick McGeehan =

American actor (1907–1988)

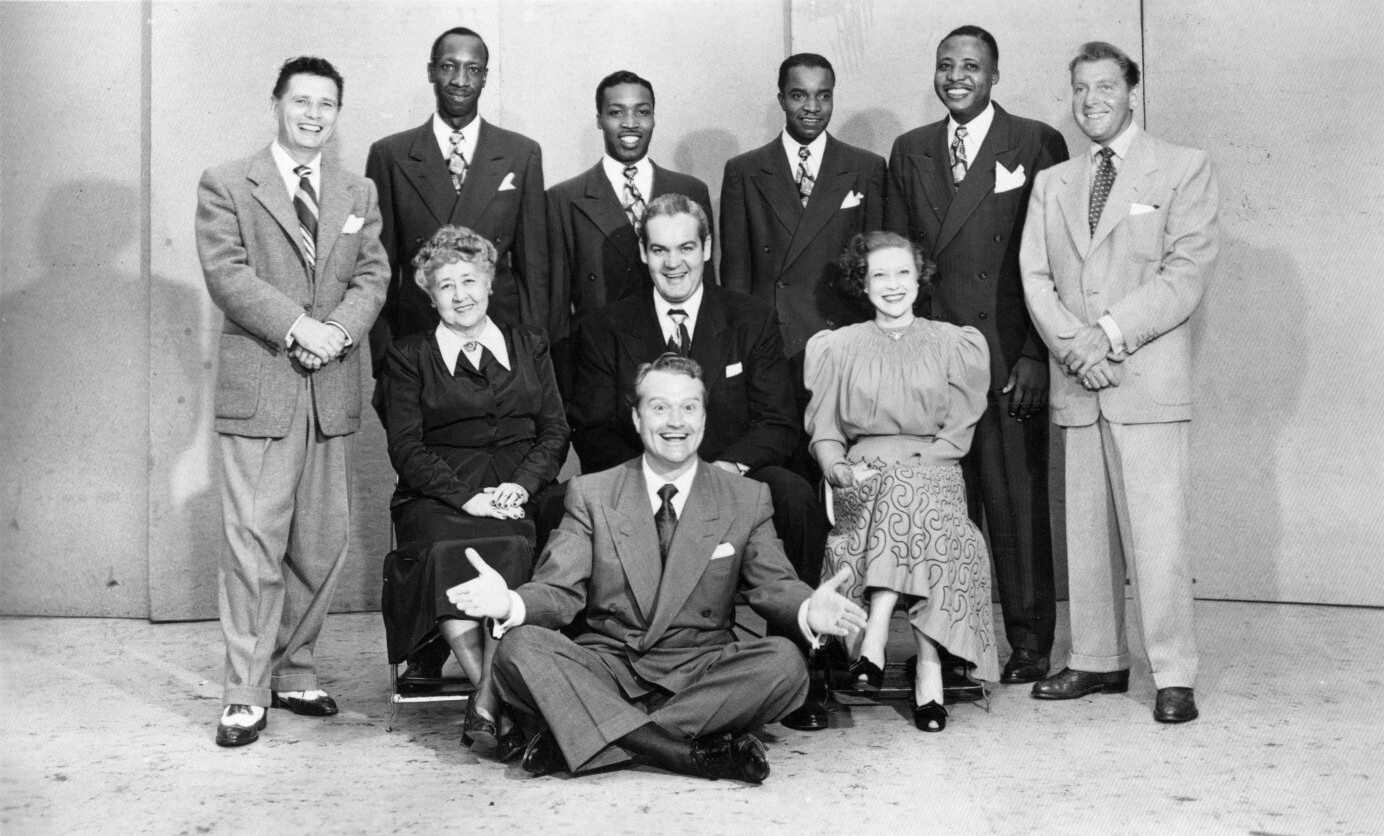
- (from back to front) McGeehan, The Four Knights, David Rose, Verna Felton, Rod O'Connor, Lurene Tuttle, and Red Skelton
- Born: Patrick Joseph McGeehan; March 4, 1907; Harrisburg, Pennsylvania, U.S.
- Died: January 3, 1988 (aged 80); Burbank, California, U.S.
- Occupation: Actor
- Years active: 1935–1988
- Known for: Announcer on The Red Skelton Show; Bear on Rock-a-Bye Bear; Doggone Tired; The Cat That Hated People
- Spouse: Bernice McGeehan
- Children: 2, including Mary Kate McGeehan

Patrick Joseph McGeehan (March 4, 1907 – January 3, 1988) was an American actor.

== Early life ==
Patrick Joseph McGeehan was born in Harrisburg, Pennsylvania on March 4, 1907. He left home at age 14 when he went to sea, later working in vaudeville, and was a tightrope walker's assistant with the Barnum & Bailey Circus.

== Career ==
McGeehan began his career in 1935 on radio.

He played Ben Calvert on the NBC radio soap, Aunt Mary (1942-1951). He was the narrator for Ceiling Unlimited on CBS (1942-1943). He played Detective Bill Lance on The Adventures of Bill Lance on CBS (1945). He was a comic foil for Red Skelton and the announcer for The Red Skelton Show on NBC (1951-1965).

For many years, McGeehan was one of a series of announcers who were the brunt of some of Skelton’s best known-lines. He was also an actor on The Adventures of Maisie (as Eddie Jordan) on the Mutual Radio Network (1949-1952), Stars over Hollywood on CBS (1941-1954), The Jack Benny Program (1932-1955) and Fibber McGee and Molly (1959). At his peak, McGeehan did more than 40 shows a week. He was the voice of The Hour of St. Francis, a Catholic radio show, where he gained worldwide recognition for his recitation of the peace prayer of St. Francis.

Throughout the 1940s and early 1950s, he had roles in many cartoons at the Metro-Goldwyn-Mayer cartoon department; the Jimmy Durante Vulture in What's Buzzin' Buzzard (1943, Tex Avery), the Wolf in The Screwy Truant (1945, Avery), the Piano Player in The Shooting of Dan McGoo (1945, Avery), Joe Wolf and the Bar Patrons in Wild and Woolfy (1945, Avery), the Cat in The Cat That Hated People (1948, Avery) and Bad Luck Blackie (1949, Avery), the Hunter in Doggone Tired (1949, Avery), the Lawyer and Dogcatcher in Wags to Riches (1949, Avery), Spike in Love That Pup (1949, William Hanna and Joseph Barbera), Jerry Mouse's Devil in Smitten Kitten (1952, Hanna-Barbera), and the Pound Worker and Joe Bear in Rock-a-Bye Bear (1952, Avery).

== Personal life ==
He was married to Bernice McGeehan. They had two children, including actress Mary Kate McGeehan.

== Death ==
McGeehan died at St. Joseph’s Medical Center in Burbank after suffering a cerebral hemorrhage on January 3, 1988. He was 80.

== Filmography ==
=== Film ===
Year	Title	Role	Notes	Ref(s).
1941	Hoola Boola	Jim Dandy	Voice	
1943	Nursery Crimes	J. Snuffington Snodgrass	Voice, uncredited	
1943	What's Buzzin' Buzzard	Jimmy Durante Vulture	Voice, uncredited	
1945	The Screwy Truant	Wolf	Voice, uncredited	
1945	The Shooting of Dan McGoo	Piano Player	Voice, uncredited	
1945	Wild and Woolfy	Joe Wolf, Bar Patrons	Voice, uncredited	
1946	Screen Snapshots No. 1: Radio Characters	Announcer - The Red Skelton Show	Voice, uncredited	
1947	The Uncultured Vulture	Vultures	Voice, uncredited	
1948	The Cat That Hated People	Cat	Voice, uncredited	
1948	The Dark Past	Commentator	Voice, uncredited	
1949	Bad Luck Blackie	Cat	Voice, uncredited	
1949	Doggone Tired	Hunter	Voice, uncredited	
1949	Wags to Riches	Lawyer, Dogcatcher	Voice, uncredited	
1949	Love That Pup	Spike	Voice, uncredited	
1952	Smitten Kitten	Jerry's Devil	Voice, uncredited	
1952	Rock-a-Bye Bear	Pound Worker, Joe Bear	Voice, uncredited	
1953	The Fossil Story	Narrator	Voice	
1953	Son of the Renegade	Narrator	Voice	
1954	Challenge the Wild			
1956	Millionaire Droopy	Lawyer, Dogcatcher	Voice, uncredited	
1957	Tops with Pops	Spike	Voice, uncredited	
1959	Okefenokee	Narrator	Voice	

=== Television ===
Year	Title	Role	Notes	Ref(s).
1950	NBC Comics			
1951–1965	The Red Skelton Show	Self - Announcer		42 episodes
1953–1954	The Bob Hope Show	Self - Announcer		7 episodes
1955–1958	People Are Funny	Self - Announcer		2 episodes
1958–1959	The Loretta Young Show	Narrator	Voice	3 episodes
1959	Fibber McGee and Molly	Self - Announcer		17 episodes
1960	Mel-O-Toons	Self - Announcer		3 episodes
1960–1963	Insight	Narrator	Voice	7 episodes
1961	The Law and Mr. Jones			Episode: "Exit"

=== Radio ===
Year	Title	Role	Notes	Ref(s).
1942–1943	Ceiling Unlimited	Narrator		
1942–1951	Aunt Mary	Ben Calvert		
1945	The Adventures of Bill Lance	Bill Lance		
1948	The George Burns and Gracie Allen Show	Guest	"Thanksgiving Program"	
1949–1952	The Adventures of Maisie	Eddie Jordan		
