= Who Killed Who? =

1943 film by Tex Avery

- The original release poster
- Directed by: Tex Avery
- Story by: Rich Hogan
- Produced by: Fred Quimby (unc.)
- Starring: Robert Emmett O'Connor; Billy Bletcher (voice); Kent Rogers (voice); Sara Berner (voice) (all uncredited)
- Music by: Scott Bradley (unc.)
- Animation by: Preston Blair; Ray Abrams; Ed Love; Al Grandmain (Effects) (All uncredited)
- Backgrounds by: John Didrik Johnsen (unc.)
- Production company: Metro-Goldwyn-Mayer
- Distributed by: Loew's Inc.
- Release date: June 19, 1943
- Running time: 8 minutes 7"55 minutes (edit)
- Country: United States
- Language: English

Who Killed Who? is a 1943 Metro-Goldwyn-Mayer film noir animated short directed by Tex Avery. The cartoon is a parody of whodunit stories and employs many clichés of the genre for humor; for example, the score is performed not by the MGM orchestra but by a solo organ, imitating the style of many radio dramas of the era.

== Plot ==
A live-action host (portrayed by Robert Emmett O'Connor) opens with a disclaimer about the nature of the cartoon, namely, that the short is meant to "prove beyond the shadow of a doubt that crime does not pay" (a direct reference to MGM's concurrent "Crime Does Not Pay" short subject series, which also opened with an actor pretending to be a law enforcement officer).

The story begins on a dark and stormy night as the victim (voiced by Kent Rogers doing an impression of Richard Haydn), presumably the master of the very large "Gruesome Gables" mansion, is reading a book based on the cartoon in which he appears. Frightened, he muses that, according to the book, he is about to be "bumped off". Someone throws a dagger with a letter attached, telling the master that he will die at 11:30. When he objects, another letter informs him that the time has been moved to midnight.

True to form, on the final stroke of midnight a mysterious killer in a heavy black cloak and hood shoots him dead with a rather large pistol (how dead he is, though, is a matter of question), and a police detective (voiced by Billy Bletcher, modeled on characters portrayed in film by Fred Kelsey) and demanding to know "Who done it?!", immediately begins to investigate. After checking out the premises and the suspicious "red herring" servants, the officer gives a lengthy chase of the real killer.

The mansion is filled with surreal pitfalls, strange characters—including a red skeleton (a parody of Red Skelton) and a ghost that is terrified of mice—and booby traps that slow and obstruct the detective. Behind a closed door marked "Do Not Open Until Xmas", he finds an angry Santa Claus. The detective eventually traps the killer and unmasks him, revealing him to be the opening-sequence host, who confesses "I dood it"—one of Skelton's catchphrases—before bursting out crying.

== Cast ==
=== Voice cast ===
- Billy Bletcher as Evil Laugh, Police Officer, Ghost (uncredited)
- Sara Berner as Screams, Cuckoo Clock Bird, Maid (uncredited)
- Kent Rogers as The Victim, Bulter, Skeletons, Falling Body, Santa Claus and the Masked Figure (uncredited)

=== Live-action cast ===
- Robert Emmett O'Connor as Host (uncredited)

== Availability ==
- Tex Avery Screwball Classics: Volume 1 Blu-ray (restored)
