= Jerky Turkey =

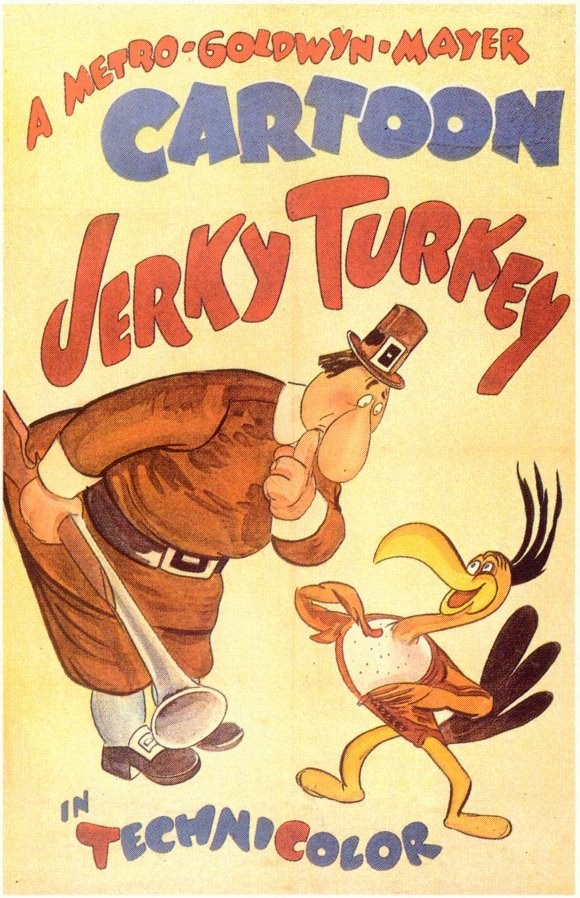
- Film poster
- Directed by: Tex Avery
- Story by: Heck Allen
- Starring: Tex Avery; Frank Graham; Leone LeDoux; Wally Maher (all uncredited)
- Music by: Scott Bradley
- Animation by: Preston Blair; Ed Love; Ray Abrams
- Color process: Technicolor
- Production company: MGM Cartoons
- Distributed by: Metro-Goldwyn-Mayer
- Release date: April 7, 1945
- Running time: 7 minutes
- Language: English

Jerky Turkey is a 1945 Metro-Goldwyn-Mayer (MGM) cartoon directed by Tex Avery. Jerky Turkey is one of three MGM cartoons in the public domain in the United States as its copyright was not renewed.

== Plot ==
The complete short.

In 1620 7/8, Pilgrims, riding a caricatured Mayflower with a number of World War II-era anachronisms (such as a navy gunnery deck, a Henry J. Kaiser nameplate and a fuel rationing card) land at Plymouth Rock and establish a colony, where they quickly separate into "Ye Democrats" and "Ye Republicans." The Pilgrims all stand in line for cigarettes (some are caricatures of Tex Avery's animation crew), while the town crier bemoans that he has been made eligible for the draft with a card bearing his "1-A" eligibility in his hand.

A pear-shaped Pilgrim, who speaks with the milquetoast mannerisms of Bill Thompson (here impersonated because he had been drafted and was unavailable), emerges from his dilapidated teardrop trailer home and goes hunting for a turkey for a Thanksgiving dinner. The turkey emerges from the "House of Seven Gobbles" (followed by a literal black market in disguise) and, seeing an easy mark and speaking in an impersonation of Jimmy Durante, offers himself to the pilgrim, only to use this as the start of a series of rapid-fire gags that stretch the limits of even cartoon physics, with the turkey consistently getting the best of his increasingly befuddled and frustrated opponent.

Eventually the two make up and decide to "eat at Joe's," following the advice of a clapboard-wearing bear advertising his steakhouse that appears throughout the short. When they reach Joe's steakhouse, the door closes, loud crashes and thuds are heard, and the bear is seen coming out of the restaurant without his sandwich board; on his back is a tattoo which reads "I'm Joe". Joe the bear is grinning and picking his teeth, as the swallowed-whole turkey and pilgrim sulk in Joe's stomach. The pilgrim closes the cartoon by holding up a sign of his own: "DON'T eat at Joe's."

== Voice cast ==
- Tex Avery as Crows Nest Pilgrim, Turkey Call, Turkey Gobble, Junior Pilgrim
- Frank Graham as Indian
- Leone LeDoux as Crying Pilgrim
- Wally Maher as Jimmy Durante Turkey

== Production ==
Some voices were provided by radio actors Wally Maher and Leone LeDoux, who had previously voiced Screwy Squirrel and who specialized in baby cries, respectively. Some internet sources cite voice actor Daws Butler as the voice of jerky turkey, but he did not make his first voice appearance until 1948 in Screen Gems' Short Snorts on Sports. Butler would go on to voice numerous characters in later Avery productions, including 1948’s Little Rural Riding Hood his first with the company. Much like other Avery shorts, this cartoon features a celebrity voice impersonation. In this short it is a Jimmy Durante impression.

While it's not known if he would have had a cameo, The Turkey from the short can be seen in a storyboard of a deleted scene from Who Framed Roger Rabbit entitled "Acme's Funeral".

== See also ==
- To Spring (1936)
- Doggone Tired (1949)
