= The Cat That Hated People =

- Directed by: Tex Avery
- Story by: Heck Allen
- Produced by: Fred Quimby
- Starring: Patrick McGeehan; Colleen Collins; Pinto Colvig; Harry E. Lang
- Music by: Scott Bradley
- Animation by: Walter Clinton; Louie Schmitt; William Shull; Grant Simmons
- Layouts by: Louie Schmitt (uncredited)
- Backgrounds by: John Didrik Johnsen (uncredited)
- Color process: Technicolor
- Production company: MGM cartoon studio
- Distributed by: Metro-Goldwyn-Mayer
- Release date: November 20, 1948
- Running time: 7 minutes
- Language: English

The Cat That Hated People is a 1948 American animated short film directed by Tex Avery and produced by Fred Quimby, featuring Blackie the Cat. Blackie's voice was supplied by Patrick McGeehan in the style of Jimmy Durante; incidental music was directed by Scott Bradley. The film borrows elements from the Warner Bros.-produced Looney Tunes cartoons Porky in Wackyland and Tin Pan Alley Cats, both directed by Bob Clampett.

== Plot ==
Blackie the Cat expresses his animosity towards people and laments how they complicate his life in the city (likely Manhattan). Due to interference, he struggles to find food easily or perform a proper serenade. Additionally, he does not get along with children, babies, housewives, or dog owners. He is frustrated by not being allowed to go outside the house or to court female cats.

Blackie continues to complain about people as he walks along a busy sidewalk, with people stepping on him. One person kicks him down the street as he declares that he wants to go to the Moon, before he notices that he is at the front of the "Moonbeam Rocket Company". He notices rockets to Mars, Venus, a miniature rocket to Palm Springs, and a "Moon Special," which he enters.

Blackie pushes the ignition, and takes off immediately. Buildings and stars duck out of the way and signs reading "NO VACANCY" appear on planets as he passes them. The rocket skywrites "Eat at Joe's" and punches a hole in the Big Dipper before the Little Dipper moves to catch the leakage. The rocket then bounces pinball-style from star to star (with points being displayed for each "bounce") until it registers "TILT" upon lunar impact.

After the crash, Blackie revels in his newfound solitude, but the silence is quickly cut short as he finds the moon is full of surreal Lunarian beings. Realizing that his original home was much better in comparison to his new surroundings on the moon, Blackie pulls down a backdrop of a golf course, places himself on a tee and sends himself back to Earth with one swing of a golf club. He returns to the same sidewalk he left in "the good ol' U.S.A." and expresses his newfound appreciation of his home and people, who continue to walk all over him.

== Voice Cast ==
- Patrick McGeehan as Blackie the Cat
  - Harry E. Lang as Blackie the Cat screeching (re-used audio from the Tom and Jerry series).
- Colleen Collins as The Housewife
- Pinto Colvig as The Laughing Lips (re-used audio, sped-up)

== Availability ==
- VHS/LaserDisc - Tex Avery's Screwball Classics
- LaserDisc - The Compleat Tex Avery
- DVD - Words and Music (USA 1995 Turner dubbed version)
- Streaming - Boomerang App (USA 1995 Turner dubbed version)
- Streaming - HBO Max
- DVD/Blu-ray - Tex Avery Screwball Classics: Volume 2 (remastered)
