= The Shooting of Dan McGoo =

1945 American cartoon directed by Tex Avery

- Original Theatrical Release poster
- Directed by: Tex Avery
- Written by: Heck Allen
- Based on: "The Shooting of Dan McGrew" by Robert W. Service
- Produced by: Fred Quimby
- Starring: Bill Thompson; Tex Avery; Frank Graham; Patrick McGeehan; Sara Berner; Imogene Lynn; Pinto Colvig
- Edited by: Fred McAlpin
- Music by: Scott Bradley
- Animation by: Ed Love; Ray Abrams; Preston Blair
- Layouts by: John Didrik Johnsen
- Backgrounds by: John Didrik Johnsen
- Color process: Technicolor
- Production company: MGM Cartoons
- Distributed by: Metro-Goldwyn-Mayer
- Release date: March 3, 1945
- Running time: 7 minutes 52 seconds
- Country: United States
- Language: English

The Shooting of Dan McGoo is a cartoon directed by Tex Avery and starring Frank Graham as the Wolf. Both Bill Thompson and Avery himself voiced the lead character Droopy. Sara Berner did the speaking voice of Lou, while her singing was provided by Imogene Lynn. The cartoon was edited for a 1951 re-release. It is a loose remake of Avery's 1939 cartoon for Warner Bros., Dangerous Dan McFoo.

== Plot ==
The cartoon starts off as a spoof of Robert W. Service's poem The Shooting of Dan McGrew, complete with a literal depiction of a man with one foot in the grave. But when Dan McGoo turns out to be Droopy, it turns into a Droopy-versus-the Wolf/Wolf-goes-ape-for-the-girl gagfest.

The story begins in Coldernell, Alaska—Population 324 and getting smaller—a wild, rough town where gold is king and gambling, drinking, and shooting each other are the major activities. Droopy is "Dangerous Dan McGoo", a lone gambler, whose only love is the girl they call "Lou", played by Red (from Red Hot Riding Hood). The wolf drags himself into the Malamute Saloon from the 50-below cold and immediately pays for "drinks on the house".

In a gag, the wolf wants a drink of whiskey (Old Block Buster 4000 lb proof). After he chugs it down, the film shows his stomach being blasted from the drink. His eyes go red and smoke comes out of his ears. He flies around the room and comes back down to the bar. Leaning over to the bartender, he complains: "This stuff's been cut!". Droopy makes a little remark to the wolf about the price of the whiskey, as if it were the price of gasoline. The wolf resents his joke ("T'ain't funny, McGoo"—a play on a catchphrase from the radio show Fibber McGee and Molly) and draws out a giant switchblade knife, about to end Droopy's life, until he stops and hears the fanfare for the lady known as Lou making her appearance.

As always, the wolf falls for Lou and tries to drag her off, but not before he goes on a shooting spree against anyone who objects to it. He shoots at a man who hides behind the table, but the table, somehow, hides behind the would-be victim. Then he shoots at the drinkers at the bar, one at a time, dropped dead from their wounds; their ghosts, however, resumed their drinking. The mortician, named Rig R. Mortis, is present at the bar, tallying the victims; his business is thriving. The wolf shoots at a different table where the card players are sitting at, the group ran away with the whole table and made their exit. Then, he shoots at the bartender covering the painting. The latter gasps and hides under the bar, revealing the woman in the half-finished painting, it says, "I ain't got no body" in the middle.

The wolf, carrying Lou, tries to make good his escape, but Droopy was waiting for him. That was when "the lights went out! A woman screamed and two guns blazed in the dark!" When the lights go back on, Droopy is victorious and receives a kiss from Lou, which he reacts to in the same way that the wolf had earlier.

== Voice cast ==
- Frank Graham as The Wolf / Bartender / Narrator / M.C.
- Tex Avery as Droopy
  - Bill Thompson as Droopy for one line: "Hello, all you happy taxpayers" (reused from Big Heel-Watha)
- Pinto Colvig as The Wolf and Droopy howling (reused from Red Hot Riding Hood)
- Sara Berner as Lou (speaking voice)
  - Imogene Lynn as Lou (singing voice)
- Patrick McGeehan as Piano Player (reused from What's Buzzin' Buzzard)
