= Dick Lundy =

Dick Lundy is the name of:

- Dick Lundy (animator) (1907–1990), American animator and film director
- Dick Lundy (baseball) (1898–1962), Negro leagues baseball player
