= The Screwy Truant =

- Title card
- Directed by: Tex Avery
- Story by: Heck Allen
- Produced by: Fred Quimby
- Starring: Wally Maher; Pinto Colvig; Patrick McGeehan; Billy Bletcher; William Hanna
- Music by: Scott Bradley
- Animation by: Preston Blair; Ed Love; Ray Abrams
- Layouts by: Claude Smith
- Color process: Technicolor
- Production company: MGM cartoon studio
- Distributed by: Metro-Goldwyn-Mayer
- Release date: January 13, 1945
- Running time: 7 minutes
- Language: English

The Screwy Truant is a 1945 Screwy Squirrel cartoon directed by Tex Avery and released by MGM.

== Summary ==
The cartoon centers around an adolescent version of Screwy Squirrel, who skips school to go fishing, which causes truant officer Meathead Dog (here seen with a different color palette but otherwise the same) to go around attempting to arrest Screwy, with various failures. At the end, Meathead finally catches Screwy and demands to know why he is not in school. Screwy tells him the reason is because he has measles, much to the horror of Meathead, who has now contracted measles from him.

== Voice cast ==
- Wally Maher as Screwy Squirrel (uncredited)
- Pinto Colvig as Meathead (uncredited)
- Sara Berner as Red Riding Hood (uncredited)
- Patrick McGeehan as Wolf (uncredited)

== Cameo ==
Tex Avery's versions of Little Red Riding Hood and the Big Bad Wolf (from Swing Shift Cinderella) make a cameo appearance. In the middle of the cartoon, the two characters interrupt one of Screwy's antics with "Wolfie" chasing Little Red Riding Hood across the screen, only for Screwy to interrupt that action by showing the wolf the title of the cartoon and informing him that he is in the wrong "picture". Swing Shift Cinderella would not premiere until seven months after the release of The Screwy Truant, so it could be inferred that its script was still being written at the time and Avery wanted to provide theater audiences with a "teaser" for that upcoming short.

== Home media releases ==
The Screwy Truant was released on LaserDisc by MGM Home Entertainment as part of All This and Tex Avery Too! in 1992 and The Compleat Tex Avery in 1993. It was released on Blu-ray by Warner Archive Collection as part of Tex Avery Screwball Classics: Volume 1 on February 18, 2020.
