= Red Hot Riding Hood (character) =

Fictional character

- Slick McWolf and Red in the 1945 animated short Swing Shift Cinderella.
- First appearance: Red Hot Riding Hood; May 8, 1943
- Created by: Tex Avery
- Designed by: Claude Smith
- Voiced by: Sara Berner (1943–1945); Connie Russell (1943; singing); Imogene Lynn (1945–1947; singing); Ann Pickard (1945; singing); Colleen Collins (1949); Teresa Ganzel (1990–1993); Grey Griffin (1996, 2010–present)

In-universe information
- Species: Human
- Gender: Female

Red Hot Riding Hood, also known as Red and Miss Vavoom in the 1990s, is an American animated character, created by Tex Avery, who appears in several MGM short films and Tom and Jerry films. She is a fictional nightclub singer and dancer who is constantly pursued by Slick McWolf. Red debuted in MGM's Red Hot Riding Hood (May 8, 1943), a modern-day variant of the fairy tale "Little Red Riding Hood".

She appeared in seven animated shorts in the Golden age of American animation, and was revived to appear in many Hanna-Barbera TV cartoon series from the 1990s until 2013.

== History ==
According to Avery, the character originated in the army, where he helped the sergeant plan training films for the animators at MGM. When the film was finished, Avery got down to the projection room, where he always "ran the picture for the producer and the whole group". When the sergeant spotted the picture, much like the wolf, he roared. Word soon spread about the picture among the army. The version he showed was the uncensored version, which had a scene where the grandma marries the wolf and has children with him, and the Hays Office found that the scene strongly suggested bestiality. The scene was ultimately cut for the theatrical release.

The character was designed by Claude Smith and animated by Preston Blair, who said that the picture originally was just planned around the wolf and the grandmother (her design was inspired by the caricatures of Peter Arno), but they soon focused mainly on Red. In fact, the character was not rotoscoped, but was drawn from his imagination. The first cartoon, garnering 15,000 bookings, was so successful that it garnered various sequels, the first being The Shooting of Dan McGoo.

Jessica Rabbit of Who Framed Roger Rabbit was inspired by Red.

== Appearances ==
=== Shorts ===
#	Title	Release date	Notes
1	Red Hot Riding Hood	May 8, 1943	Red's debut.
2	Who Killed Who?	June 19, 1943	Cameo, seen on the picture.
3	Big Heel-Watha	October 21, 1944	In a Screwy Squirrel cartoon; as Minnie Hot-Cha in unmasked Native American Indian form.
4	The Shooting of Dan McGoo	March 3, 1945	In a Droopy cartoon; as Lou
5	Swing Shift Cinderella	August 25, 1945	As Cinderella
6	Wild and Woolfy	November 3, 1945	In a Droopy cartoon
7	The Hick Chick	June 15, 1946	Cameo, as a nurse in hen form.
8	Uncle Tom's Cabaña	July 19, 1947	As Little Eva
9	Little Rural Riding Hood	September 17, 1949	Red's final theatrical cartoon, reused footage from Swing Shift Cinderella.
10	Thanks a Latte	1999	Cameo, in production with Cartoon Network.

=== Television ===
- Tom & Jerry Kids (1990–1993) as Miss Vavoom
- Droopy, Master Detective (1993) as Miss Vavoom

=== Films ===
- Quest for Camelot (1998) (Cameo)
- Tom and Jerry Meet Sherlock Holmes (2010)
- Tom and Jerry: Robin Hood and His Merry Mouse (2012) as Maid Marian
- Tom and Jerry's Giant Adventure (2013) as the Red Fairy

=== Video games ===
- Droopy's Tennis Open (2002) as Bubbles Vavoom

=== Comics ===
- Wolf & Red (1995) (Dark Horse Comics)
- Droopy (1995) (Dark Horse Comics)
- San Diego Comic Con Comics (1995) #4 (Dark Horse Comics)
- Screwball Squirrel (1995) (Dark Horse Comics)
- Comics and Stories (1996) (Dark Horse Comics)

== Voices ==
Red is voiced by the following known actresses:

- Sara Berner (Debut, 1943–1945) Speaking Voice
- Connie Russell (Debut, 1943) Singing Voice
- Imogene Lynn (1945–1947) Singing Voice
- Ann Pickard (1945) Singing Voice
- Colleen Collins (1949) Speaking Voice
- Teresa Ganzel (1990–1993) as Miss Vavoom
- Grey DeLisle (1996, 2010–2013)
