= Ed Love =

American animator (1910–1996)

- Born: Edward H. Love; May 24, 1910; Tremont, Pennsylvania, U.S.
- Died: May 6, 1996 (aged 85); Valencia, California, U.S.
- Occupations: Animator; Animation director
- Years active: 1930–1994
- Employer(s): Walt Disney Productions (1930-1934, 1936–1941); Animated Pictures (1934-1936); MGM Cartoons (1941–1946); Republic Pictures (1946); Walter Lantz Productions (1946–1948); Hanna-Barbera (1959–1980s)
- Website: Url

Edward H. Love (May 24, 1910 – May 6, 1996) was an American animator who worked at various studios during the Golden age of American animation. He is well known for contributing to Walt Disney Animation productions such as Mickey's Trailer and Fantasia, and, later in his career, as an animator for Tex Avery at the Metro-Goldwyn-Mayer cartoon department. Love won the Golden Award at the 1984 Motion Pictures Screen Cartoonists Awards in 1984.

== Career ==
Love was born on May 24, 1910, in Tremont, Pennsylvania. Love came to Los Angeles in 1930. The effects of The Great Depression caused Love to search for a job in 1931. He discovered an opening as a Disney cartoonist in the local newspaper. Love was interested, used a phone book to find an animator, and learned how to animate in four months. Besides drawings as a child, his entire animation experience consisted of only those four months of learning. Love walked into Walt Disney's office, unscheduled, and showed him a stop-motion animation sample of Mickey Mouse playing the violin. Walt Disney was satisfied and hired him to work at Disney as an animator that same day. Love was initially paid $18 a week and animated Goofy and Pluto more frequently than other characters. Disney gave their animators a lot of freedom by giving them the option if they want to add additional frames. Love worked with the effects manager but not with other animators. Love would briefly leave the studio to work at Mickey Mouse co-creator Ub Iwerks' studio. He would come back to Disney in 1936 after the studio folded due to lack of funding. Love left the studio for good after participating in the Disney animators' strike in 1941. At that time, Love was making $50 a week.

Love, along with several other ex-Disney personnel, were offered jobs at the Metro-Goldwyn-Mayer cartoon department. There he would work in Tex Avery's unit until 1945. At MGM, Love would animate as much as 5,600 of the 8,800 frames for a short film, which is about 4 out of 6 minutes of animation. He and other animators were limited to only 480 frames a week, a limitation which allowed MGM to provide openings for new animators. It also restricted the present animators from being paid more, regardless of whether or not they produced more frames. In 1945, he was fired by Fred Quimby due to an incident at a Christmas party in which Cal Howard brought alcohol into the ink and paint department with Love taking the blame for it. Love would briefly work in Hugh Harman's animation studio and also help animate Bob Clampett's cartoon It's a Grand Old Nag for Republic Pictures, before settling into Walter Lantz Productions in 1947. However, the state of Lantz's studio was rapidly decreasing because Lantz did not have funds for the studio, forcing him to close it down in 1949. Love would not return following the studio's reopening.

== Later career and death ==
Love would move to commercial animation in the 1950s for companies such as Paul Fennell's studio, but returned to work full-time at Hanna-Barbera Productions in 1959 for their television shows, such as Yogi Bear, The Flintstones and The Jetsons. He would also serve as an animator for DePatie–Freleng Enterprises in the 1960s and 70s. Love would continue to work in the industry, in which he worked on shows like the Adventures of Sonic the Hedgehog pilot, up until the 1990s, where he mainly served as an animation director.

Love died of heart failure on May 6, 1996, in Valencia, California at age 85.

== Selected filmography ==
=== Shorts ===
- Mickey's Amateurs (1937)
- Lonesome Ghosts (1937)
- Mickey's Trailer (1938)
- The Autograph Hound (1939)
- Officer Duck (1939)
- Billposters (1940)
- Timber (1941)
- Symphony Hour (1942)
- Blitz Wolf (1942)
- The Early Bird Dood It! (1942)
- Dumb-Hounded (1943)
- Red Hot Riding Hood (1943)
- What's Buzzin' Buzzard (1943)
- Screwball Squirrel (1944)
- Happy-Go-Nutty (1944)
- Big Heel-Watha (1944)
- The Screwy Truant (1945)
- Jerky Turkey (1945)
- The Shooting of Dan McGoo (1945)
- Wild and Wolfy (1945)
- Swing Shift Cinderella (1945)
- Lonesome Lenny (1946)
- The Hick Chick (1946)
- Northwest Hounded Police (1946)
- Hound Hunters (1947)
- Red Hot Rangers (1947)
- It's a Grand Old Nag (As Edward Love, 1947)
- Woody the Giant Killer (1947)
- Banquet Busters (1948)
- Wacky-Bye Baby (1948)
- Wet Blanket Policy (1948)
- Pixie Picnic (1948)
- Playful Pelican (1948)
- Wild and Woody! (1948)
- Scrappy Birthday (1949)
- Drooler's Delight (1949)

=== Feature films ===
- Fantasia (1940) (The Sorcerer's Apprentice sequence)
- Jetsons: The Movie (1990)

=== Television shows ===
- The Flintstones (1960)
- Yogi Bear (1961)
- Scooby Doo, Where Are You? (1969)
- The Smurfs (1981)
- Adventures of Sonic the Hedgehog (pilot episode, 1992)
