= Stanislav Holý =

Czech graphic artist

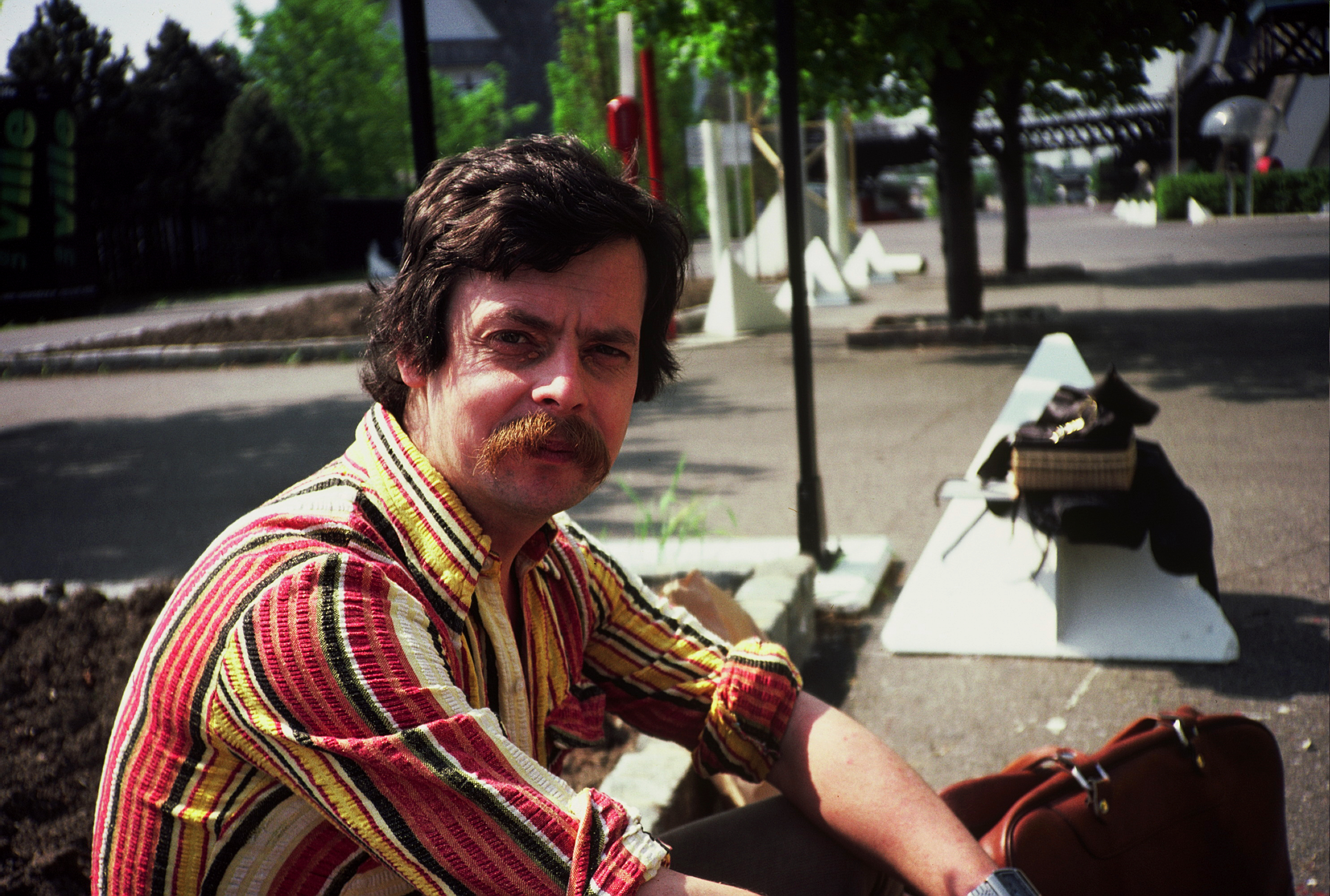
- Born: Stanislav Holý; 25 February 1943; Prague, Protectorate of Bohemia and Moravia
- Died: 14 August 1998 (aged 55); Prague, Czech Republic
- Known for: Graphic arts, caricature, animated film design

Stanislav Holý (25 February 1943 – 14 August 1998) was a Czech graphic artist, caricaturist, and a designer of animated films.

== Career ==
He studied at the Applied Arts Academy in Prague. He is known as an author and illustrator of a series of children's books. As a cartoonist, he is known as the creator of the cartoon character Mr. Pip (Czech: Pan Pip).

== Books authored ==
- 1969 – Algebrion
- 1978 – Procházky pana Pipa (Mr. Pip's Trips 1) . Praha: Albatros.
- 1982 – Námluvy pana Pipa. Praha: Albatros.
- 1988 – Jů, Hele, neděle! Praha: Panorama.
- 1989 – Svět je báječné místo k narození : kniha kresleného humoru. Praha: ČTK Repro.
- 2000 – Jů, Hele, pondělí. Praha: Pan Pip Studio Publishing.
- 2011 – Procházky pana Pipa 2 (Mr. Pip's Trips 2), rozš. vyd. Benešov: ELTSEN.
