= Gary Spatz =

American acting coach

- Born: April 1, 1951 (age 74); New York City, United States
- Years active: 1989 – present
- Spouse: Jill Nyren
- Website: http://www.garyspatz.com/

Gary Spatz is a Los Angeles–based acting coach who specializes in working with young performers. He has worked with many entertainers who later went on to success in their careers. His work on The All New Mickey Mouse Club with performers like Justin Timberlake, Britney Spears, Ryan Gosling and Keri Russell began a long career of coaching young actors for film and television projects.

== Early life ==
Gary Spatz was born in New York on April 1, 1951, and raised in New York and Miami, Florida. He then moved to Washington D.C. where he attended the American University and studied history. After attending a summer acting program at the Arena Stage Theater in D.C. he decided to move to Los Angeles in 1977.

In Los Angeles, Gary Spatz continued to study acting with Paul Sills and American Theater Arts from 1978 through 1985.

== Career ==
Gary began working with Disney on the movie Honey I shrunk the kids' where he served as the acting coach for the child actors Jared Rushton, Thomas Wilson Brown, Robert Oliveri, and Amy O'Neill.

Since the beginning, Gary has credited his then girlfriend, TV post-production executive and now wife and partner, Jill Nyren, as being instrumental in procuring and negotiating his "on-set" coaching career.

He continued working with Disney Channel as a creative consultant from 1990 to 1995 and was also part of The All New Mickey Mouse Club (MMC) where he coached the young performers including Christina Aguilera and J C Chasez in addition to those mentioned earlier.

Gary continued his work as an acting coach for young actors on several television programs between 1990 and 2009 including Roseanne, Everybody Loves Raymond and The Suite Life of Zack & Cody.

In 2005 Gary founded The Playground, A Young Actors' Conservatory in Century City California where young actors are trained using a curriculum that Gary is constantly revising based on his industry experience. The school was set up to reflect working conditions and features sets, cameras and monitors. He is currently active as the Director of the conservatory.

The Playground is both a lesson-based conservatory and also the place where Gary provides private coaching to young actors in order to help them prepare for auditions, callbacks and roles in feature films, theater, and episodic television. There have already been several students of the conservatory who have careers in the entertainment industry including Kay Panabaker, Tiffany Espensen, Ashley Argota, India Eisley, Nate Hartley, Joel Courtney, Megan Goodman, Sari Arambulo, and Jadagrace Gordy.

In 2010 The Playground and Gary were chosen to provide coaching services for the feature film Judy Moody and the Not Bummer Summer (2011 release) based on the work of Megan McDonald.

=== Acting teacher ===
- The Playground – young actors' conservatory (owner and director) / 2005 – present
- Actorsite – children and adult workshops, scene study, improvisation / 2000–2003
- Young Actors' Space – scene study, improvisation for children (6–18) / 1985–2000
- VanMar Academy – scene study for adults / 1981–1984

=== Acting coach ===
- "Judy Moody and the Not Bummer Summer" – Smokewood Entertainment – Feature / 2011
- "The Suite Life of Zack and Cody" – The Disney Channel / 2004–2008
- "Everybody Loves Raymond" – CBS / 2003–2005
- "Triple Play" – (Pilot) – Disney Channel / 2004
- "Magicbox" – (IMAX/3-D) – Director / Brett Leonard
- "Sister, Sister" – Paramount / 1994–1998
- "The Smart Guy" – Disney Television
- "Roseanne" – Carsey / Werner / 1990–1997
- "Jeff Foxworthy Show" – Brillstein / Grey / NBC
- "Daisy Mom" – (Pilot) Director / Andy Weyman / ABC Production / 1996
- "Mickey Mouse Club" – Disney Television / 1990–1995
- "Davis Rules" – Carsey / Werner
- "Honey, I Shrunk The Kids" – Disney Feature
- Creative Consultant to The Disney Channel / 1990–1995

=== On-screen appearances (as himself) ===
- E! True Hollywood Story – Young Hollywood: A to Zac / 2008
- Biography – Justin Timberlake / 2008
- Biography – The New Mickey Mouse Club / 2008

== Former students and clients ==
Christina Aguilera	Chad Allen	Ashley Argota
Penn Badgley	Elizabeth Berkley	Jessica Biel
Michael Bower	Jenna Boyd	Thomas Wilson Brown
Amanda Bynes	Brandon Call	Aaron Carter
Sarah Chalke	JC Chasez	Joel Courtney
Caleb Courtney	Nikki Deloach	Ahmet Zappa
Stephen Dorff	Hilary Duff	Luke Edwards
India Eisley	Ethan Embry	Lindsay Felton
Michael Fishman	Dale Godboldo	Jadagrace Gordy
Robert Gorman	Ryan Gosling	Brian Austin Green
Maggie Gyllenhaal	Armie Hammer	Nate Hartley
Rebecca Herbst	Christine Lakin	Maggie Lawson
Maggie Linderman	Jeremy Lelliott	Tony Lucca
Stephen Lungsford	Allison Mack	Kellie Martin
Christopher Masterson	Danny Masterson	Crystal McKellar
Danica McKellar	Matt Morris	Tahj Mowry
Tamera Mowry	Tia Mowry	Ashleigh Norman
Kay Panabaker	Danielle Panabaker	Nicholas Pappone
Janel Parrish	Sydney Tamiia Poitier	Lindsey Price
Cassidy Rae	Ariana Richards	Camilla Rosso
Becky Rosso	Keri Russell	Taran Noah Smith
Britney Spears	Dylan Sprouse	Cole Sprouse
Sadie Stratton	Paul Sutera	Hilary Swank
Jodie Sweetin	Madylin Sweeten	Sawyer Sweeten
Sullivan Sweeten	Justin Timberlake	David Tom
Heather Tom	Nicholle Tom	Alexa Vega
Scott Whyte	Elijah Wood	Marc Worden
Brian Dietzen	Logan Shroyer	Lauren Donzis
Trinity Bliss
