= Wild and Woolfy =

- Title card
- Directed by: Tex Avery
- Written by: Heck Allen
- Produced by: Fred Quimby (credited in reissue)
- Starring: Tex Avery; Patrick McGeehan; Frank Graham; Pinto Colvig; Sara Berner
- Music by: Scott Bradley
- Animation by: Ed Love; Ray Abrams; Preston Blair; Walter Clinton (credited in original issue)
- Production company: Metro-Goldwyn Mayer Cartoons
- Distributed by: Metro-Goldwyn-Mayer
- Release date: November 3, 1945
- Running time: 7:37
- Country: United States
- Language: English

Wild and Woolfy is a 1945 animated cartoon short, one of six cartoons in which Droopy was paired with a wolf as his acting partner. It is one of a very few cartoons in the series where Bill Thompson did not voice Droopy, instead Tex Avery himself provided the voice.

== Plot ==
In this western-themed cartoon, the Big Bad Wolf, now playing a cowboy criminal called "Joe" Wolf in this cartoon, kidnaps the cowgirl singer, Red (played by Red Hot from Red Hot Riding Hood) from Rig-R-Mortis saloon, where their motto is "Come in and get stiff." Droopy and a posse of cowboys doggedly follow him all over the Great Plains (mainly Droopy), but the wolf is far ahead. However, like in the previous cartoons, Droopy shows up in the places the wolf doesn't expect, forcing him to call for the waiter to keep Droopy away from him.

Finally, in his hideout, the wolf, thinking Red is underneath a sheet, unveils it, and kisses Droopy, who happens to be underneath and sitting on a stack of books. Desperate, the wolf asks him just who the heck he is and why he kept following him throughout the cartoon. Droopy replies, "Why, haven't you heard? I'm the hero," and promptly knocks out the wolf. He calls for the waiter to take the wolf off to jail. After receiving a "My Hero" kiss from Red, Droopy goes crazy and kidnaps Red himself.

== Voice cast ==
- Tex Avery as Droopy / The Horse
- Patrick McGeehan as The Wolf / Posse Leader
  - Tex Avery also voices The Wolf for lines: "Gimme a Neapolitan" and "Whoahhhh!"
  - Pinto Colvig as The Wolf howling (reused from Red Hot Riding Hood)
- Sara Berner as Red (speaking voice)
  - Ann Pickard as Red singing Out on the Texas Plains
  - Obed Pickard, Jr and Ruth Pickard as backing musicians.
- Frank Graham as Race Caller
- Heck Allen as Slim the Bar Patron

== Notes ==
- Wild and Woolfy is basically a color remake of the 1935 Oswald the Lucky Rabbit cartoon Towne Hall Follies, also directed by Avery (albeit just credited in the other cartoon as a "lead animator") and it featured an identical storyline, despite being set in a different historical context.
