= What's Buzzin' Buzzard? =

- Directed by: Tex Avery
- Story by: Rich Hogan
- Produced by: Fred Quimby
- Starring: Patrick McGeehan; Kent Rogers; John Wald; William Hanna
- Music by: Scott Bradley
- Animation by: Ray Abrams; Preston Blair; Ed Love; Irven Spence (uncredited)
- Layouts by: Bernard Wolf (uncredited)
- Backgrounds by: John Didrik Johnsen (uncredited)
- Color process: Technicolor
- Production company: MGM Cartoons
- Distributed by: Metro-Goldwyn-Mayer
- Release date: November 27, 1943
- Running time: 8:13
- Country: United States
- Language: English

What's Buzzin' Buzzard? is a 1943 American animated short film directed by Tex Avery, produced by Fred Quimby, and featuring musical score by Scott Bradley. The short's plot, poking fun at the food shortages common in the United States at the time, focuses on two turkey vultures struggling to find food in the desert. It was released to theaters on November 27, 1943 by Metro-Goldwyn-Mayer.

The cartoon's working title was Vulture A La King, which was changed to reference the 1943 film What's Buzzin', Cousin?. It is currently available on the Tex Avery Screwball Classics: Volume 1 Blu-Ray.

== Plot ==
The short begins in the Painted Desert as a Jimmy Durante sound alike turkey vulture (voiced and impersonated by Patrick McGeehan) complains to his friend Joe (voiced by Kent Rogers) about his hunger that his stomach literally starts to talk back to him, "Send down one hamburger! Everything on it!" The Durante Vulture quotes "See what I mean!" When Joe is asked by the Durante Vulture how he's doing, Joe opens his mouth where there is a spider web with a sign that reads "Closed for the duration". The Durante Vulture expresses his desire for a T-bone steak. A picture of a steak is shown on the screen for a couple seconds followed by a sign that reads "3 minute intermission for drooling - The Management".

They later spot a jackrabbit (also voiced by Rogers) and fight over him. They get caught up in their fight and the rabbit gets away. The vultures then start to plot against each other and try eating other. The Durante vulture sits next to a rock and Joe sneakily makes a sandwich with his hand. The Durante vulture lets out a yelp (voiced by William Hanna), and when he questions Joe's actions he lies and explains he has a toothache. He asks him to examine his tooth while and tries to bite his head. Joe begins to salt the Durante vulture's tail before he hits him on the head with a mallet. The Durante Vulture starts to read a book on cooking and is unknowingly being cooked in a pot by Joe. The Durante Vulture soon realizes this and runs into a log cabin. Joe tricks him into coming outside by pretending to see a beautiful woman. The Durante Vulture comes out and Joe hits him on the head and then covers him with butter before Joe gets up and runs. The two vultures chase after each other until The Durante Vulture pretends to be a rattlesnake which causes Joe to faint. However immediately afterwards, the Durante Vulture sees a real one and faints himself.

The Durante Vulture later paints a rock to look like a steak and calls Joe over to eat it. Joe eats it perfectly as if it were a real steak. The Durante Vulture tries to do the same only to break his teeth. The vultures get in a scuffle that turns into a whirlwind. Joe escapes and pulls a pot under Durante Vulture only to notice that he has disappeared. The Durante Vulture is revealed to have put a broiling pan under Joe, which he slams a lid on, puts in an oven and locks the oven shut. The Durante Vulture sits on top of the stove which is revealed to be a conveyor belt to a meat slicer. The Durante Vulture barely escapes being sliced and runs into a hole, and Joe uses a pickaxe to get to him. The Durante Vulture pops up from another hole behind him and while trying to decapitate Joe proceeds to chop the cactus. The Durante Vulture grows tired and surrenders. He goes over to have himself beheaded and Joe almost does, but the Durante Vulture runs after Joe with the butcher knife.

The vultures chase each other with various weapons around a rock until the Durante Vulture notices that the rabbit has returned. They capture the rabbit and fight over him only for the rabbit to break it up and asks if they know what day it is as he shows them the calendar date that says "Meatless Tuesday". Having realized they fought over the rabbit for nothing, the vultures bawl hysterically.

Before the cartoon can end, a "Patrons Attention" title card appears as the announcer (voiced by John Wald) quotes the following:

Ladies and gentlemen, your attention please. Due to the numerous requests received in the last five minutes, we're going to show you the steak again.

The picture of the T-bone steak is shown again with "Auld Lang Syne" playing in the background as the cartoon ends.

== Voice Cast ==
- Kent Rogers as Joe Buzzard / Jack Rabbit / Echo: "Send down one hamburger!"
- Patrick McGeehan as Jimmy Durante Buzzard
- John Wald as Announcer
- William Hanna as Additional Vocal Effects

== Credits ==
- Director: Tex Avery
- Story: Rich Hogan
- Animation: Ed Love, Ray Abrams, Preston Blair
- Music: Scott Bradley

== Availability ==
- Tex Avery Screwball Classics: Volume 1 (Blu-Ray)

== See also ==
- The House of Tomorrow – another MGM cartoon that had a "Patrons Attention" at the end of it
