= Little Rural Riding Hood =

- Film poster
- Directed by: Tex Avery
- Story by: Rich Hogan; Jack Cosgriff
- Produced by: Fred Quimby
- Starring: Colleen Collins; Pinto Colvig; Imogene Lynn; Daws Butler (all uncredited)
- Music by: Scott Bradley
- Animation by: Grant Simmons; Walter Clinton; Robert Cannon; Michael Lah; Preston Blair (reused animation, uncredited)
- Backgrounds by: John Didrik Johnsen
- Color process: Technicolor; Perspecta (reissue)
- Production company: MGM cartoon studio
- Distributed by: Metro-Goldwyn-Mayer
- Release date: September 17, 1949
- Running time: 6:00
- Country: United States
- Language: English

Little Rural Riding Hood is a 1949 MGM animated cartoon short subject directed by Tex Avery, conceived as a follow-up to his 1943 cartoon Red Hot Riding Hood.

In 1994, the cartoon was ranked in 23rd place of The 50 Greatest Cartoons. It is essentially a retelling of the Aesop fable, "The Town Mouse and the Country Mouse".

== Plot ==
The film opens with a stereotypical hillbilly version of Little Red Riding Hood (voiced by Colleen Collins), telling the audience that she is taking "nourishment" (as she holds up a cliché moonshine bottle) to her grandma, who lives on a country farm. At the farmhouse, a wolf (voiced by Pinto Colvig) reveals himself to the audience, but confesses that he doesn't want to eat Red. He is actually in love with her and wishes to kiss her.

After a comical chase around the farmhouse, the wolf catches Red, and both prepare to kiss each other when a telegram arrives for the wolf from his city cousin (voiced by Daws Butler impersonating George Sanders), inviting him to meet the city's equivalent of his Red (the same version seen in Red Hot Riding Hood). Upon seeing her photograph, the country wolf immediately falls in love with her and departs for the city.

Unlike his rural cousin, the city wolf is rich, suave, and sophisticated. The city wolf takes his cousin to a local nightclub where the city's Red performs her seductive song-and-dance routine, a rendition of "Oh Johnny, Oh Johnny, Oh!" called "Oh Wolfie" (elements of this scene were recycled from Avery's 1945 cartoon Swing Shift Cinderella). The country wolf whistles and leers throughout the performance, becoming completely aroused by Red. However, before he can rush onto the stage to join her, his city cousin stops him (by grabbing his suspenders, placing a hammer in it, then letting go so it would snap back and knock him out), and takes him back to the country, feeling that city life is too much for him.

Upon their arrival at the farmhouse, they find the country's Red waiting for them. Upon seeing country-Red, the city wolf, surprisingly, becomes wildly attracted to her, and runs to her, but is stopped by his country cousin the same way the city cousin had stopped him earlier. Seeing an opportunity to see the city's Red again, the country wolf promptly decides to take his city cousin back home, claiming that he feels the country life is too much for him, and drives off back to the city.

== Voice Cast ==
- Pinto Colvig as Country Wolf
- Colleen Collins as Country Red
- Daws Butler as City Wolf and Telegram Boy
- Imogene Lynn as City Red (via archival footage from Swing Shift Cinderella)

== Credits ==
- Directed by: Tex Avery
- Story: Rich Hogan, Jack Cosgriff
- Animation: Walter Clinton, Robert Cannon, Grant Simmons, Michael Lah
- Backgrounds: John Didrik Johnsen (uncredited)
- Music: Scott Bradley
- Produced by: Fred Quimby

== Availability ==
- Tex Avery Screwball Classics: Volume 2 (Blu-Ray)
