= Droopy, Master Detective =

American animated television series

- Genre: Film noir; Comedy; Satire
- Based on: Droopy by Tex Avery
- Voices of: Don Messick; Charlie Adler; William Callaway; Teresa Ganzel; Frank Welker
- Narrated by: Don Messick; Gary Owens; Frank Welker
- Theme music composer: Gary Lionelli
- Composer: Gary Lionelli
- Country of origin: United States
- Original language: English
- No. of episodes: 13 (39 segments)

Production
- Executive producer: Joseph Barbera
- Producers: Joseph Barbera; Don Jurwich; Larry Huber; Kay Wright
- Running time: 22 minutes (7 minutes per segment)
- Production companies: Hanna-Barbera Cartoons (Note: Animation outsourced to Fil-Cartoons and Mr. Big Cartoons.); Turner Entertainment

Original release
- Network: Fox Kids
- Release: September 11 – December 4, 1993

Related
- Tom & Jerry Kids

Droopy, Master Detective is an American animated television series produced by Hanna-Barbera Cartoons in association with Turner Entertainment, and a spin-off of Tom & Jerry Kids. It debuted on Fox's Saturday morning block Fox Kids and ran for 13 episodes from September 11, 1993 to Jan 1, 1994; it was dropped from Fox's Saturday morning schedule in January 1994, and returned on weekday afternoons in August and September.

== Premise ==
Droopy, Master Detective is a spoof of detective films and cop shows, featuring Droopy and his son, Dripple, as detectives on the mean streets of a big city. Newly made seven-minute episodes were mixed in with new seven-minute cartoons featuring the Tom and Jerry Kids characters. The rest of the half-hour program mostly was taken up by Screwy Squirrel, another Tex Avery creation from the 1940s.

In these new cartoons, Screwy made his home in a public park, making life miserable for hot-headed park attendant Dweeble and his dog Rumpley — both, rather typical Hanna-Barbera comedy foes rather than Tex Avery-inspired characters. It also included two more characters from the previous show: Wild Mouse and Lightning Bolt the Super Squirrel.

== Cast ==
=== Main ===
- Don Messick as Droopy
- Charlie Adler as Dripple, Screwball Squirrel, Lightning Bolt the Super Squirrel
- William Callaway as Rumpley
- Teresa Ganzel as Miss Vavoom, Misty Mouse (in "Primeval Prey")
- Frank Welker as McWolf, Dweeble, Wild Mouse, Grunch the Caveman

=== Additional voices ===
- Brandon Adams
- Joe Alaskey
- Patricia Alice Albrecht
- Lewis Arquette
- René Auberjonois
- Michael Bell as Roqueford Le Poulet (in "The Case of Pierre Le Poulet")
- Jeff Bennett
- Gregg Berger
- Sheryl Bernstein as Miss Mysterious
- Susan Blu as Auntie Snoople (in "Aunt Snoople")
- Sorrell Booke
- Charlie Brill
- Nicole Brown
- Julie McWhirter as Tera Boom-Boom (in "Droopy and the Cyberdolts")
- S. Scott Bullock
- Arthur Burghardt
- Greg Burson
- Hamilton Camp
- Nancy Cartwright
- Marsha Clark
- Selette Cole
- Townsend Coleman
- Danny Cooksey
- Bud Cort
- Jesse Corti
- Peter Cullen
- Brian Cummings
- Jim Cummings as The Blobfather (in "The Monster Mob"), Baby Bandit (in "The Babyman Bank Heists"), Frankenator (in "The Monster Mob"), McWolf's Horse, Pierre Le Poulet (in "The Case of Pierre Le Poulet"), The Raj
- Tim Curry
- Jennifer Darling as Fifi
- Mari Devon
- Nancy Dussault
- Maggie Egan
- June Foray
- Pat Fraley as The Yolker (in "Return of the Yolker")
- Brad Garrett
- Kathy Garver
- Dick Gautier
- Barry Gordon
- Joan Gerber
- Archie Hahn
- Phil Hartman
- Pamela Hayden
- George Hearn
- Dana Hill
- Jerry Houser
- Charity James
- Nick Jameson
- Tony Jay
- Arte Johnson as Shadowman (in "Shadowman and the Blue Pigeon")
- Vicki Juditz
- Zale Kessler
- Kip King
- Paul Kreppel
- Maurice LaMarche as Thundergut the Super Squirrel (in "Battle of the Super Squirrels")
- David Lander
- Nancy Linari as Zombina (in "The Monster Mob")
- Allan Lurie
- Sherry Lynn
- Tress MacNeille
- Danny Mann
- Kenneth Mars
- Chuck McCann as King of the Sea (in "Droopy's Deep Sea Mystery"), Baby Bandit's Henchman (in "The Babyman Bank Heists")
- Edie McClurg
- Diane Michelle
- Brian Stokes Mitchell
- Alan Oppenheimer
- Bibi Osterwald
- Gary Owens as the Narrator
- Valery Pappas
- Patricia Parris
- Rob Paulsen as Edna Evergreen, Crummy McMummy (in "The Monster Mob"), Prime Minister Luck-Nuck, Oliver J. Tudball (in "The Case of the Snooty Star")
- Patrick Pinney
- Henry Polic II
- Tony Pope
- Hal Rayle
- Clive Revill
- Robert Ridgely
- Kimmy Robertson
- Stuart Robinson
- Roger Rose as Johnsy Megabucks
- Neil Ross
- Ronnie Schell
- Susan Silo
- Sarah Silverman as Melody WOOO-WOOO Stardust (in "The Case of the Snooty Star")
- Hal Smith
- Kath Soucie
- Michael Stanton
- Sally Struthers
- Barbara Stuart
- Marcelo Tubert
- Janet Waldo as Wild Mouse's Mother (in "Primeval Prey")
- B.J. Ward as The Mistress of Baskerville Manor (in "Sherlock Droopy Gets Hounded")
- Jimmy Weldon
- Jane Wiedlin
- Lee Wilkof
- April Winchell
- Paul Winchell as Rumpley's Dad
- Joanne Worley
- Kris Zimmerman
- Patric Zimmerman

== Episodes ==
The segments indicate in colors by which characters starred in them:

- Red = Detective Droopy & Dripple (23 segments)
- Orange = Screwball Squirrel (13 segments)
- Purple = Lightning Bolt, The Super Squirrel (2 segments)
- Green = Wildmouse (1 segment)

No.	Title	Written by	Storyboard by	Original release date
1a	"Droopy's Deep Sea Mystery"	Stewart St. John	Jerry Eisenberg & Joel Seibel	September 11, 1993
When a beautiful mermaid enlists the help of super sleuths Droopy and Dripple to find her father's magic golden shell, the evil Matoona sets out to stop them!
1b	"How Can We Miss You If You Won't Go Away?"	Jim Ryan	Jerry Eisenberg	September 11, 1993
Dweeble and Rumply try every trick in the book to rid the park of Screwball.
1c	"Droopy and the Case of the Missing Dragon"	Don Nelson & Arthur Alsberg	Jerry Eisenberg & Floyd Norman	September 11, 1993
Droopy, hired by a mysterious woman to find the stolen Dragon used in the Chinese New Year's parade, also finds danger from the villainous double of the mysterious woman.
2a	"The Babyman Bank Heists"	Arthur Alsberg & Don Nelson	Jerry Eisenberg	September 18, 1993
Elliot Droopness and Son come face to face and baby carriage to baby carriage, with the arch criminal Babyman, in uncovering a series of unusual bank robberies.
2b	"Dweeble's Night Out"	Jim Ryan	Jerry Eisenberg & David Feiss	September 18, 1993
Dweeble comes home from a big night out only to find he's unprepared for a surprise visit from the park inspector.
2c	"The Deep Space Chase"	Stewart St. John	Bob Singer	September 18, 1993
When a space alien is framed for polluting her planet, she enlists the aid of super-sleuth detectives Droopy and Dripple to clear her name.
3a	"The Case of the Snooty Star"	Sandy Fries	Bob Singer & Joel Seibel	September 25, 1993
Droopy saves a Hollywood actress from being sabotaged by that nefarious bad guy, Oliver J. Tudball.
3b	"A Screwball Romance"	Sandy Fries	Bob Singer	September 25, 1993
Screwball gives Rumply pointers on the finer art of wooing when Rumply falls for a pretty poodle.
3c	"Round 'Em Up Bub"	Sandy Fries	Joel Seibel	September 25, 1993
Droopy and Dripple do battle against Butch McWolf in the Old West.
4a	"The Monster Mob"	Jim Ryan	Jerry Eisenberg & Tom Ellery	October 2, 1993
One by one, the world's worst organized crime gang, the Monster Mob, go after Detectives Droopy and Dripple.
4b	"Everybody Out"	Jim Ryan	Jerry Eisenberg	October 2, 1993
Dweeble hires a junkyard dog to get rid of Screwball. The dog is an overachiever who throws out Dweeble and Rumply.
4c	"Sherlock Droopy"	Jim Ryan	Bob Singer	October 2, 1993
Droopy is the famous British Detective Sherlock Droopy. He and Dr. Dripple do battle with the infamous Professor Wolfiatity, their arch-nemesis. They stop him in Queen Victoria's bedroom.
5a	"Queen of the Mutant Weirdo Vampires"	Jim Ryan	Jerry Eisenberg & Floyd Norman	October 9, 1993
Droopy and Dripple are called to the set of "Queen of the Mutant Weirdo Vampires". Zuzu le Pew, the star of the film, threatens to quit unless she has protection and the villain is revealed.
5b	"Screwball Snowballs"	Sandy Fries	Barrington Bunce & Lew Saw	October 9, 1993
It is all out war when Screwball, Rumply, and Dweeble have a snowball fight during the first snow of winter.
5c	"Shadowman and the Blue Pigeon"	Don Nelson & Arthur Alsberg	Bob Singer & Tom Ellery	October 9, 1993
Droopy and Dripple face off against a shadowy criminal in order to protect a precious gem.
6a	"Dueling Detectives"	Stewart St. John	Bob Singer	October 16, 1993
Droopy and Dripple face off against McClue McWolf to see who has the best detective agency.
6b	"Squirrelicus Obnoxiousness"	Steward St. John	Jerry Eisenberg & Joel Seibel	October 16, 1993
Screwball takes full advantage of the Endangered Committee when they come to the park to protect certain species.
6c	"Sherlock Droopy Gets Hounded"	Arthur Alsberg & Don Nelson	Barrington Bunce	October 16, 1993
While trying to protect a client, Droopy and Dripple come face to face with the Hound of Baskerville.
7a	"Droopy and the Cyberdolts"	Bruce Morris	Bob Singer	October 23, 1993
Droopy and Dripple set out to find a stolen power source.
7b	"Pickax Max"	Jim Ryan	Bob Singer	October 23, 1993
The peace and quiet of Dweeble Park is rudely interrupted by the cantankerous Pickax Max who comes digging for gold.
7c	"Hey! Where's Arnold?"	Sandy Fries	Jerry Eisenberg & Joel Seibel	October 23, 1993
Droopy tracks down a rare species of elephant in the jungle kingdom of Tushyrumba.
8a	"Auntie Snoople"	Jim Ryan	Jerry Eisenberg & Floyd Norman	October 30, 1993
Droopy and Dripple are ably assisted by their meddlesome Auntie Snoople as they hunt down and capture mean McWolf, world's rottenest jail breaker.
8b	"Demolition Disorder"	Bruce Morris	Bob Singer & Joel Sebiel	October 30, 1993
Screwball enlists the aid of Dweeble and his dog Rumply to fight off a hostile takeover of his park by millionaire developer Chauncey Megabucks, who wants to turn Screwball's pastoral paradise into a high rise parking garage.
8c	"Mushu McWolf"	Jim Ryan, Don Jurwich & Jerry Eisenberg	Jerry Eisenberg & Joel Seibel	October 30, 1993
Droopy and Dripple set out to bring in a criminal named Mushu McWolf who is a self proclaimed martial arts master.
9a	"Return of the Yolker"	Jim Ryan	Bob Singer	November 6, 1993
Droopy and Dripple must stop The Yolker from stealing a very valuable egg.
9b	"A Chip Off the Old Blockhead"	Sandy Fries & Tony Craig	Barrington Bunce & Tony Craig	November 6, 1993
Rumpley's father comes to visit Rumpley to teach him his squirrel-catching ways.
9c	"Mighty McWolf"	Jim Ryan	Curt Walstead & Jerry Eisenberg	November 6, 1993
Droopy and Dripple must stop a former hero named Mighty McWolf when he turns to a life of crime.
10a	"Sheep Thrills"	Sandy Fries, Don Jurwich & Jerry Eisenberg	Bob Singer	November 13, 1993
When sheep start disappearing, Droopy and Dripple are hired to investigate.
10b	"Screwball Out West"	Stewart St. John	Bob Singer & Lew Saw	November 13, 1993
When Dweeble's doctor prescribes a two week stay at Diamond Dave's Dandy Dude Ranch to get away from Screwball, it seems like a dream come true. Screwball wins a free trip to the same ranch, it turns into a real hootenanny of a time.
10c	"The Maltese Fossil"	Jim Ryan	Jerry Eisenberg & Curt Walstead	November 13, 1993
Droopy and Dripple are hired to retrieve a dinosaur fossil from a rampaging caveman.
11a	"Deep Swamp Droopy"	Sandy Fries, Don Jurwich & Jerry Eisenberg	Joel Seibel & Jerry Eisenberg	November 20, 1993
The competition is fierce on the swamp when Droopy and Dripple face off against McWolf in a riverboat race.
11b	"Dog Breath Dweeble"	Sandy Fries	Barrington Bunce	November 20, 1993
Dweeble dreams of living his life on the high seas as that rotten no good pirate Dog Breath Dweeble.
11c	"Hogs Wild"	Jim Ryan	Roman Arambula	November 20, 1993
A motorcycle gang of hogs terrify a local town and it is up to Lightning Bolt to stop them.
12a	"The Case of Pierre le Poulet"	Sandy Fries, Don Jurwich & Jerry Eisenberg	Barrington Bunce & Jerry Eisenberg	November 27, 1993
Master detectives Droopy and Dripple face their toughest case yet when a big city crime boss wants them eliminated from the scene.
12b	"Commotion on the Ocean"	Sandy Fries	Curt Walstead	November 27, 1993
While on a cruise ship, Dweeble and Rumply discover an uninvited guest in Screwball.
12c	"Alligator Droopy"	Arthur Alsberg & Don Nelson	Joel Seibel	November 27, 1993
Droopy and Dripple set out to find a missing kangaroo.
13a	"Primeval Prey"	Jim Ryan	Joel Seibel & Jerry Eisenberg	December 4, 1993
Wild Mouse tries to evade capture from an explorer.
13b	"Dweeble's Worst Nightmare"	Jim Ryan	Curt Walstead	December 4, 1993
Dweeble's worst nightmare comes true when he confronts Screwball in his dreams. Screwball drives him super-nuts until Dweeble finally awakens.
13c	"Battle of the Super Squirrels"	Jim Ryan & Jerry Eisenberg	Joel Seibel & Jerry Eisenberg	December 4, 1993
Lightning Bolt battles Thundergut in a superhero showdown to prove who is better.

== Home media ==
As of October 15, 2023 it is currently available on iTunes Store in SD.
