= Dumb-Hounded =

- Poster
- Directed by: Tex Avery
- Written by: Rich Hogan
- Produced by: Fred Quimby
- Starring: Bill Thompson; Frank Graham (both uncredited)
- Music by: Scott Bradley
- Animation by: Ed Love; Irven Spence; Ray Abrams; Preston Blair; (all uncredited)
- Layouts by: Irvin Levine; Bernard Wolf (both uncredited)
- Backgrounds by: John Didrik Johnsen (uncredited)
- Production company: MGM Cartoons
- Distributed by: Metro-Goldwyn-Mayer
- Release date: March 20, 1943
- Running time: 8:00
- Country: United States
- Language: English

Dumb-Hounded is a 1943 American animated short film directed by Tex Avery and written by Rich Hogan. It was the first cartoon to feature Droopy. The film was released on March 20, 1943 by Metro-Goldwyn-Mayer.

== Plot ==
When an imprisoned killer (played by Tex Avery's Big Bad Wolf character) escapes from Swing Swing Prison (a parody of Sing Sing Prison), numerous bloodhounds are released to track him down, including Droopy, who lags far behind the rest. He greets the audience and announces himself as the story's hero. Initially moving slowly, Droopy still manages to quickly locate the Wolf, who spends the entire story trying to escape from him. At one point, the Wolf even attempts to flee from Droopy by boarding a taxi, train, ship, and aircraft in succession. However, no matter where the Wolf flees, Droopy appears and greets him sarcastically. When the Wolf asks Droopy how he manages to keep up, Droopy laconically responds “Let’s not get nosy, bub.”

Ultimately, Droopy ends the futile chase by dropping a massive boulder onto the Wolf from above a rooftop to crush him (commenting to the audience that it is indeed gruesome), resulting in the Wolf's capture. Droopy receives his cash reward from the town mayor, upon which he jumps about cheering loudly in complete enthusiasm, before pausing, and, once again in his signature slow, deadpan characterization, informing the audience, "I'm happy".

== Voice cast ==
- Bill Thompson as Droopy (uncredited)
- Frank Graham as the Killer (Big Bad Wolf) / Mayor (uncredited)

== Crew ==
- Directed by: Tex Avery
- Written by: Rich Hogan
- Animation: Ray Abrams, Preston Blair, Ed Love, Irven Spence
- Character Design: Irvin Levine
- Layout: Irvin Levine, Bernard Wolf
- Backgrounds: John Didrik Johnsen
- Film and Sound Editor: Fred McAlpin
- Music: Scott Bradley
- Co-Producer: William Hanna
- Produced by: Fred Quimby

== Legacy ==
- Northwest Hounded Police (1946) features Droopy and the Wolf character in a similar set-up. Again, the Wolf flees from Droopy, who keeps popping up in unexpected places.
- In the early 2000s a Cartoon Network short Thanks a Latté features Droopy and the Wolf character in a nearly-similar set-up; where he works at a coffee shop and forces a stingy wolf into giving him a tip when the wolf leaves the shop without paying for his latte.
- In 2020, Dumb Hounded was released and digitally restored on the Tex Avery Screwball Classics: Volume 1 Blu-Ray by Warner Archive.
