= Droopy =

Fictional cartoon dog

- Droopy character
- First appearance: Dumb-Hounded (1943)
- Created by: Tex Avery
- Designed by: Irving Levine
- Voiced by: Bill Thompson (1943, 1945, 1949–1958); Tex Avery (1943, 1945–1946, 1955); Don Messick (1949–1950, 1956, 1989–1993); Daws Butler (1955); Frank Welker (1980, 2002); Richard Williams (1988–1989); Corey Burton (1990–1993); Billy West (1996–1997); Jeff Bergman (1999–2010, 2017–2021); Jeff Bennett (2002); Maurice LaMarche (2003–2004); Joe Alaskey (2004, 2010–2016); Don Brown (2006); Michael Donovan (2006–2007); Joey D'Auria (2019, 2021) (see below)

In-universe information
- Alias: Happy Hound
- Species: Dog (Basset Hound)
- Gender: Male
- Family: Drippy (twin brother); Dripple (son)

Droopy is an animated character created by Tex Avery for theatrical cartoon shorts produced by the Metro-Goldwyn-Mayer cartoon studio during the golden age of American animation. He is an anthropomorphic white Basset Hound with a droopy face. Essentially the polar opposite of Avery's other MGM character, the loud and wacky Screwy Squirrel, Droopy is deadpan, diminutive and hardly imposing, speaking a jowly monotone voice; his personality is a façade that hides his incredible strength and competence in outwitting his enemies.

The character first appeared, nameless, in Avery's 1943 cartoon Dumb-Hounded. Though he was not called "Droopy" onscreen until his fifth cartoon, Señor Droopy (1949), the character was already named "Droopy" in model sheets for his first cartoon. He was officially first labeled "Happy Hound", a name used in the character's appearances in Our Gang Comics. He starred in 24 theatrical cartoons, ending in 1958 when MGM closed its cartoon department. The character has been revived several times for new productions including films and television shows also featuring MGM's other famous cartoon stars, Tom and Jerry, either as their ally or adversary. He hosted Turner Broadcasting System's Cartoon Network in its earliest days since its launch in 1992.

In the cartoon Northwest Hounded Police, Droopy's last name was given as "McPoodle". In The Chump Champ, it was given as "Poodle". Nevertheless, Droopy is generally understood to be a Basset Hound.

== History ==
=== Metro-Goldwyn-Mayer ===
Droopy first appeared in the MGM cartoon Dumb-Hounded, released on March 20, 1943. Droopy's first scene is when he saunters into view, looks at the audience, and declares, "Hello, all you happy people ... you know what? I'm the hero." In the cartoon, Droopy is tracking an escaped convict and is always waiting for the crook wherever he turns up. Avery had used a similar gag in his Merrie Melodies short Tortoise Beats Hare (1941) starring Bugs Bunny, which in turn was an expansion/exaggeration of the premise of his The Blow Out (1936) with Porky Pig. In fact, this cartoon shows that early ideas about Droopy's personality were already germinating, as that film's Cecil Turtle has similarities to Droopy.

Droopy's meek, deadpan voice and personality were modeled after the character Wallace Wimple on the radio comedy Fibber McGee and Molly; actor Bill Thompson, who played Wimple, was the original voice of Droopy. While Thompson served in the US Navy during World War II, Droopy's voice was provided by other voice actors, including Don Messick, who reprised the role in the 1990s. Avery's preferred gag man Heck Allen said that Avery himself provided the voice on several occasions, and "You couldn't tell the difference." Droopy himself was a versatile actor: he could play a Mountie, a cowboy, a deputy, an heir, or a Dixieland-loving everyday Joe with equal ease. The same voice was used for Big Heel-Watha in the Screwy Squirrel cartoon of the same name and for a Pilgrim who chases a turkey modeled after Jimmy Durante in Avery's 1945 short Jerky Turkey. In his earliest films, Droopy is shown to be equally capable of greed, hyperactivity and lechery (towards Red) as his adversaries upon receiving monetary gain, but still having sufficient self control to maintain his personality; this would be downplayed as Droopy gradually appeared in more cartoons after Northwest Hounded Police (1946).

One of Droopy's more surprising traits is his incredible strength, given his diminutive stature and unassuming looks and personality, but this was usually reserved for when he was upset (with a few rare exceptions, where he very easily moved his adversary without harming him), at which time he would say in a monotone voice "You know what? That makes me mad" prior to thrashing the hapless villain of the piece. One such occasion was in Señor Droopy, where he did this to a bull. It happened again in One Droopy Knight, where a dragon was Droopy's victim. In the second case, he also broke the dragon's tail off and knocked him very far away with it like a baseball bat (apparently, it regenerated like a lizard's tail, given the unharmed dragon later became Droopy's servant/pet). This was also once done by a baby version of Droopy in the Western-themed short Homesteader Droopy. One example of Droopy showing his strength without being provoked was in The Chump Champ in which Spike (as "Gorgeous Gorillawitz") stuffs an anvil in a speed bag. Droopy easily punches the bag several times but when Spike takes a swipe at it, half of him shatters to the ground. Another running gag that occurred during many of Droopy's cartoons was whenever Droopy's adversaries chopped down a tree. As the tree started coming down and was about to crush the unsuspecting Droopy, the adversary would run far the opposite way, point to the sky, and shout, "TIM.....". Then, in a moment of surprise, the tree would change direction and end up crushing the adversary instead and he would finish by saying, ".....ber" while still pointing to the sky with a look of confusion on his face. In most of his cartoons, Droopy matches wits with either a slick anthropomorphic Wolf (the Wolf character "portrays" the crooks in both Dumb-Hounded and its semi-remake, Northwest Hounded Police (1946)) or a bulldog named "Spike", sometimes silent, sometimes sporting a Gaelic accent. Two Droopy cartoons – The Shooting of Dan McGoo and Wild and Woolfy – also feature appearances from the curvy cutie of Avery's Red Hot Riding Hood (1943) as a damsel in distress being pursued by the Wolf. Three later Droopy cartoons –Three Little Pups (1953), Blackboard Jumble (1957), and Sheep Wrecked (1958) – feature a slow-moving southern wolf character. Voiced by Daws Butler in a dialect Butler later used for Hanna-Barbera's Huckleberry Hound, this wolf was a more deadpan character with a tendency to whistle "Kingdom Coming" (aka "Jubalio") to himself (much like Huckleberry would sing "Oh My Darling Clementine" to himself).

Avery took a year-long break from MGM from 1950 to 1951, during which time Dick Lundy took over his unit to do one Droopy cartoon, Caballero Droopy, and several Barney Bear cartoons. Avery returned in late 1951 and continued with Droopy and his one-shots until the Avery unit was dissolved by MGM in 1953. Michael Lah, an Avery animator, stayed on long enough to help William Hanna and Joseph Barbera complete Deputy Droopy after Avery had left the studio. Lah himself then left MGM, but returned in 1955 to direct CinemaScope Droopy cartoons costarring either Spike (now called Butch because of the same-named bulldog in Hanna and Barbera's Tom and Jerry cartoons) or the "Kingdom Coming"-whistling wolf. The opening title card was replaced with a newly drawn sequence in which Droopy gives his deadpan greeting: "Hello, all you happy people." Seven Droopy cartoons were created under the H-B production stable. One of these, One Droopy Knight (1957), was nominated for the 1957 Academy Award for Best Short Subject (Cartoons). However, by the time of One Droopy Knight's release in December 1957, the MGM cartoon studio had been closed for six months, a casualty of corporate downsizing.

=== Later appearances ===
In 1980, Filmation produced a series of lower-budget Droopy shorts for television as part of its Tom and Jerry TV series The Tom and Jerry Comedy Show. In the 1990s Hanna-Barbera series Tom & Jerry Kids, Droopy had a young son named Dripple (voiced by Charlie Adler), an older version of the infant we see in Homesteader Droopy. The mild success of the show provided perhaps the most Droopy merchandise: plush toys, gummy snacks, figurines, etc. In 1993, Tom & Jerry Kids had a spin-off series, Droopy, Master Detective, which cast Droopy and son as film noir style detectives. Droopy also had cameos in two theatrical features: as an elevator operator in Who Framed Roger Rabbit (where he was voiced by the film's animation director Richard Williams), and in Tom and Jerry: The Movie. Droopy also had cameos in all three subsequent Disney-produced Roger Rabbit shorts, Tummy Trouble (again he's an elevator operator), Roller Coaster Rabbit (he plays a bad guy dressed as Snidely Whiplash), and Trail Mix-Up (he plays a scuba diver), and the 1992 animated TV special The Rosey and Buddy Show. Droopy also appears in the 2006 cartoon series Tom and Jerry Tales, and has appeared in almost every Tom and Jerry direct-to-video movie, beginning with Tom and Jerry: The Magic Ring, either as an ally or an enemy.

Droopy appeared on various Cartoon Network specials and bumpers throughout the 1990s. When the network launched on October 1, 1992, Droopy was the host of the special "Droopy's Guide to the Cartoon Network", which served as an orientation for the new channel. In 1997, Droopy appeared in the faux cartoon blooper reel bumper Bloopers of the Cartoon Stars. Here, he says his signature line "I'm so happy" while actually smiling.

In June 1999, Droopy appeared in a Cartoon Network short entitled Thanks a Latté, in which he works at a coffee shop and forces a stingy wolf into giving him a tip. In said short, the character is depicted with a bald head and was voiced by Jeff Bergman. The short aired on Cartoon Network's sister channel Boomerang until 2015. During the same period, Droopy was also featured in Adult Swim's Harvey Birdman, Attorney at Law in the episode "Droopy Botox", voiced by Maurice LaMarche. He is seen seeking a settlement after a cosmetic surgeon injected him with too much botox (a running gag in this episode was the fact that Droopy was often seen crying despite having a huge grin frozen on his face, a reverse of the classic cartoons where a sad-faced Droopy often said, "You know what? I'm happy"). A memorable Cartoon Network promotional spot featured Droopy (voiced by Don Messick) and Shaggy from Hanna-Barbera's Scooby-Doo parodying a dialog scene between Jules and Vincent in Pulp Fiction.

A three-issue Droopy comic book miniseries was released in the mid-1990s by Dark Horse Comics.

== Voice actors ==
The following is the list of voice actors who have portrayed Droopy, the years they regularly voiced the character, and the films and/or television series they did the voice in:

- Bill Thompson (1943, 1945, 1949, 1951–1958; Dumb-Hounded, The Shooting of Dan McGoo (one line reused from Big Heel-Watha), Señor Droopy, Out-Foxed, The Chump Champ, Daredevil Droopy, Droopy's Good Deed, Droopy's Double Trouble, Caballero Droopy, The Three Little Pups, Drag-A-Long Droopy, Homesteader Droopy, Dixieland Droopy, Deputy Droopy, Grin and Share It, Blackboard Jumble, One Droopy Knight, Sheep Wrecked, Mutts About Racing, Droopy Leprechaun)
- Tex Avery (1943, 1945–1946, 1955; enthusiastic screaming in Dumb-Hounded, The Shooting of Dan McGoo, Wild and Woolfy, Northwest Hounded Police, Deputy Droopy)
- Pinto Colvig (1945; howling in The Shooting of Dan McGoo (reused from Red Hot Riding Hood))
- Don Messick (1949–1950, 1956, 1989–1993, 1997; Wags to Riches, The Chump Champ, Millionaire Droopy, Tom & Jerry Kids, Tom and Jerry: The Movie, Droopy, Master Detective, Cartoon Network bumpers)
- Daws Butler (1955; Deputy Droopy)
- Frank Welker (1980, 2002; The Tom and Jerry Comedy Show, Scooby Month promotion)
- Richard Williams (1988–1989; Who Framed Roger Rabbit, Tummy Trouble)
- Corey Burton (1990–1993; Roller Coaster Rabbit, Trail Mix-Up)
- Billy West (1996–1997; The Tex Avery Show promotion, Bloopers of the Cartoon Stars)
- Marc Silk (1997; Cartoon Network bumpers)
- Jeff Bergman (1999–2010, 2017–2021; Thanks a Latté, Tom and Jerry Meet Sherlock Holmes, Tom and Jerry: Willy Wonka and the Chocolate Factory, Tom & Jerry)
- Daren Tillinger (2001; Web Premiere Toons)
- Jeff Bennett (2002; Tom and Jerry: The Magic Ring)
- Maurice LaMarche (2003–2004; Cartoon Network NBA All-Star Slam, Harvey Birdman, Attorney at Law)
- Joe Alaskey (2004, 2010–2016; Boomerang UK and Ireland bumpers, Tom and Jerry and the Wizard of Oz, Tom and Jerry: Robin Hood and His Merry Mouse, Tom and Jerry's Giant Adventure, Tom and Jerry: Spy Quest, Tom and Jerry: Back to Oz)
- Don Brown (2006; Tom and Jerry Tales (season 1))
- Michael Donovan (2007; Tom and Jerry Tales (season 2))
- Joey D'Auria (2019, 2021; The Tom and Jerry Show)

Voiced by in unofficial material:

- Seth MacFarlane (2009, 2014, 2017; Family Guy)
- Trey Parker (2010, 2025; South Park; as Disabled Kid #3 in "Crippled Summer")
- Jim Meskimen (2012; Mad)

== Filmography ==
The Droopy cartoons were directed by Tex Avery (1943–1955), Dick Lundy (1952), Michael Lah (1955–1958) and William Hanna and Joseph Barbera (1956), at the Metro-Goldwyn-Mayer cartoon studio in Hollywood, California. All cartoons were released to theaters by Metro-Goldwyn-Mayer. Fred Quimby was the producer of the first 17 cartoons from 1943 to 1955. Quimby retired in 1955 and from 1956 to 1958, Hanna and Barbera produced the cartoons until MGM closed the cartoon studio in 1957, and the last cartoon was released in 1958. Most of these cartoons were produced in the standard Academy ratio (1.37:1); seven cartoons were produced in widescreen CinemaScope format only.

Like any other studio, MGM reissued and edited its cartoons when re-released to theaters. Many pre-1951 cartoons were reissued with Perspecta Sound, which was introduced in 1954. MGM also reissued its cartoons before the introduction of Perspecta Sound. Because of the 1965 MGM vault fire, the original negatives and pre-reissue versions of pre-1951 MGM cartoons are lost.

Title	Director(s)	Producer(s)	Original release date	Notes
Dumb-Hounded	Tex Avery	Fred Quimby	March 20, 1943	
The Shooting of Dan McGoo	Tex Avery	Fred Quimby	March 3, 1945	
Wild and Woolfy	Tex Avery	Fred Quimby	November 3, 1945	
Northwest Hounded Police	Tex Avery	Fred Quimby	August 3, 1946	
Señor Droopy	Tex Avery	Fred Quimby	April 9, 1949	Guest appearance of Lina Romay in a live-action sequence in the end.
Wags to Riches	Tex Avery	Fred Quimby	August 13, 1949	Remade as Millionaire Droopy (1956); Submitted and screened at the 21st Academy Awards for an Oscar consideration, but was not nominated.
Out-Foxed	Tex Avery	Fred Quimby	November 5, 1949	
The Chump Champ	Tex Avery	Fred Quimby	November 4, 1950	Released posthumously after Frank Graham's death two months prior to the project
Daredevil Droopy	Tex Avery	Fred Quimby	March 31, 1951	
Droopy's Good Deed	Tex Avery	Fred Quimby	May 5, 1951	
Droopy's Double Trouble	Tex Avery	Fred Quimby	November 17, 1951	Introduction of Droopy's twin brother, Drippy
Caballero Droopy	Dick Lundy	Fred Quimby	September 27, 1952	Only Droopy cartoon directed by Dick Lundy
The Three Little Pups	Tex Avery	Fred Quimby	December 26, 1953	Live-action sequence
Drag-a-Long Droopy	Tex Avery	Fred Quimby	February 20, 1954	
Homesteader Droopy	Tex Avery	Fred Quimby	July 10, 1954	Introduction of Droopy's infant son, Dripple (as Droopy Jr.)
Dixieland Droopy	Tex Avery	Fred Quimby	December 4, 1954	
Deputy Droopy	Tex Avery; Michael Lah	Fred Quimby	October 28, 1955	
Millionaire Droopy	William Hanna; Joseph Barbera; Tex Avery	William Hanna; Joseph Barbera	September 21, 1956	CinemaScope remake of Wags To Riches. Tex Avery is given director credit as the cartoon retains the soundtrack and timing from Wags to Riches with revised animation and backgrounds. Only Droopy cartoon directed by William Hanna and Joseph Barbera
Grin and Share It	Michael Lah	William Hanna; Joseph Barbera	May 17, 1957	Produced in CinemaScope
Blackboard Jumble	Michael Lah	William Hanna; Joseph Barbera	October 4, 1957	Produced in CinemaScope
One Droopy Knight	Michael Lah	William Hanna; Joseph Barbera	December 6, 1957	Produced in CinemaScope; Nominated–Academy Award for Best Animated Short Film
Sheep Wrecked	Michael Lah	William Hanna; Joseph Barbera	February 7, 1958	Produced in CinemaScope
Mutts About Racing	Michael Lah	William Hanna; Joseph Barbera	April 4, 1958	Produced in CinemaScope
Droopy Leprechaun	Michael Lah	William Hanna; Joseph Barbera	July 4, 1958	Produced in CinemaScope

== Cameos ==
Title	Director(s)	Producer(s)	Original release date	Notes
Who Framed Roger Rabbit			June 22, 1988	Appears as an Elevator operator for Eddie.
Tummy Trouble			June 23, 1989	
Roller Coaster Rabbit			June 15, 1990	
Trail Mix-Up			March 12, 1993	
Tom and Jerry: The Movie			July 30, 1993	Briefly appears as one of the captured animals trapped in Dr. Applecheek's basement.
Tom & Jerry			February 26, 2021	Briefly appears in the pound that Tom and Jerry were taken to.
Coyote vs. Acme			August 28, 2026	Briefly appears on a "No Pets Allowed" sign in the Prickly Pear motel.

== Home media ==
- Seven Droopy shorts on VHS as The Adventures of Droopy released in 1989.
- Six Droopy shorts on VHS as Here Comes Droopy! released on October 10, 1990.
- Four Droopy shorts on VHS as Droopy and Company released on February 29, 1992.
- Seventeen Droopy shorts on LaserDisc as The Compleat Tex Avery released on January 13, 1993.
- On May 15, 2007, Warner Home Video released all of Droopy's MGM cartoons on DVD as Tex Avery's Droopy: The Complete Theatrical Collection, complete and uncut. The seven Droopy cartoons produced in CinemaScope were released in their original widescreen versions, instead of the pan and scan versions regularly broadcast on television.
- On February 18, 2020, four Droopy shorts appeared uncut and digitally restored in HD on Tex Avery Screwball Classics: Volume 1 Blu-ray from Warner Archive Collection. An additional six Droopy cartoons appeared uncut and digitally restored on Tex Avery Screwball Classics: Volume 2 released on December 15, 2020. An additional five Droopy cartoons appeared uncut and digitally restored on Tex Avery Screwball Classics: Volume 3 released on October 5, 2021. An additional nine Droopy cartoons will appear uncut and digitally restored on Tex Avery Screwball Classics: Volume 4, releasing on December 11, 2026.

These cartoons can also be found as extras on DVDs of classic Metro-Goldwyn-Mayer films of the period:

- Wild and Woolfy is on the DVD of Thrill of a Romance
- Northwest Hounded Police is on the DVD of Courage of Lassie
- Wags to Riches is on the DVD of The Barkleys of Broadway
- Senor Droopy is on the DVD of That Midnight Kiss
- Out Foxed is on the DVD of Madame Bovary
- The Chump Champ is on the DVD of Pagan Love Song
- Droopy's Double Trouble is on the DVD of Royal Wedding
- Dixieland Droopy is on the DVD of The Long, Long Trailer
- Blackboard Jumble is on the DVD of Blackboard Jungle
- Millionaire Droopy is on the DVD of High Society
- Deputy Droopy is on the DVD of It's Always Fair Weather
- The Three Little Pups is on the DVD of The Band Wagon

== See also ==
- The Tom & Jerry Comedy Show
- Tom & Jerry Kids
- Tom and Jerry Tales
- Droopy, Master Detective
- Droopy's Tennis Open
- The Rosey and Buddy Show
