= Rich Hogan =

American screenwriter (1913–1981)

- Born: Richard Adams Hogan; June 7, 1913; Buffalo, New York, U.S.
- Died: January 28, 1981 (aged 67); Los Angeles, California, U.S.
- Occupation: Animation screenwriter
- Years active: 1938–1950
- Employer(s): Leon Schlesinger Productions (1938–1941); Metro-Goldwyn-Mayer (1941–1950)
- Spouse: Margaret Kramer (m. 1946)
- Children: 4

Richard Adams Hogan (June 7, 1913 – January 28, 1981) was an American screenwriter best known for his work at Warner Bros. Cartoons and Metro-Goldwyn-Mayer.

== Biography ==
Hogan was born in Buffalo, New York on June 7, 1913 to John Martin Hogan and Florence L. Adams. His father was a customer service manager for Buffalo General Electric Co. Hogan studied at St. Joseph's Collegiate Institute and Pratt Institute, graduating from the latter in 1937.

Hogan was hired after graduation by Leon Schlesinger Productions as a screenwriter for the Looney Tunes and Merrie Melodies series, as Tedd Pierce had left for Fleischer Studios. According to Hogan, the studio's work experience was "a combination of three-ring circus, insane asylum and newspaper at final edition time". His first credited film was Frank Tashlin's The Major Lied 'Til Dawn (1938). Hogan cooperated frequently with director Tex Avery, greatly contributing to his films' ironic style of humor and dialogue. He helped write A Wild Hare (1940), refining Bugs Bunny's characterization and popularizing him.

Hogan left the studio after Avery was suspended by Leon Schlesinger over a planned ending of The Heckling Hare (1941). He wrote Blitz Wolf (1942) on a freelance capacity before joining Avery at Metro-Goldwyn-Mayer (MGM). He served in World War II for the United States Army from 1942 to 1946; he was replaced by Heck Allen as Avery's primary screenwriter. He wasted no time in returning to MGM, where he continued to write cartoons for Avery. Hogan left MGM after Avery took a sabbatical and Dick Lundy took over his unit in 1950, settled in Sherman Oaks, where he became a real estate agent with Coldwell Banker.

== Personal life ==
Hogan married Margaret "Marge" Matilda Kramer on March 27, 1946 in New Orleans, Louisiana. They had four children. He died on January 28, 1981.
