= Sleepy-Time Squirrel =

- Directed by: Dick Lundy
- Story by: Heck Allen; Jack Cosgriff
- Produced by: Fred Quimby
- Starring: Paul Frees
- Music by: Scott Bradley
- Animation by: Robert Bentley; Michael Lah; Walter Clinton; Grant Simmons; Ray Patterson
- Backgrounds by: John Didrik Johnsen
- Color process: Technicolor
- Production company: MGM Cartoons
- Distributed by: Metro-Goldwyn-Mayer
- Release date: June 19, 1954
- Language: English

Sleepy-Time Squirrel is a 1954 MGM cartoon featuring Barney Bear. It is the 25th Barney Bear short.

== Plot ==
Barney gets ready to hibernate for the winter, but notices that he is out of firewood, so he chops a nearby tree to get some. Unbeknownst to him, the tree was the home of a squirrel named Jimmy who was also hibernating, so Barney calms the irate squirrel by letting him sleep in his cabinet drawer. Jimmy turns out to be noisy, breaking crockery, opening a window, and giving off loud noises while eating nuts. When Jimmy does fall asleep, he has nightmares of being chased by an angry purple turtle, waking him up again. So Barney takes the turtle out of the dream, but it disappears right after it bit his finger.

Barney gives Jimmy a sleeping pill to make him doze off immediately, but Jimmy snores so loudly that he keeps Barney awake. Barney puts a hose onto Jimmy's mouth and puts the other end in a tree outside his house to divert the noise. However, inside the tree, a sleeping striped wild cat is awakened by the noise, and angrily follows the hose, which the squirrel has now placed over Barney's mouth. The cat blows into the hose in revenge and inflates Barney into a balloon. Barney whooshes around the house before shrinking and landing in Jimmy's lap, who happily adopts him as a teddy bear and, cuddling Barney, finally goes to sleep.

== See also ==
- The Bear That Couldn't Sleep
- Bah Wilderness
- Barney's Hungry Cousin
- Wee-Willie Wildcat
- Bird-Brain Bird Dog
