= Barney's Hungry Cousin =

- Directed by: Dick Lundy
- Story by: Jack Cosgriff; Heck Allen
- Produced by: Fred Quimby
- Starring: Paul Frees
- Music by: Scott Bradley
- Animation by: Robert Bentley; Michael Lah; Walter Clinton; Grant Simmons; Ray Patterson
- Backgrounds by: John Didrik Johnsen
- Color process: Technicolor
- Production company: MGM Cartoons
- Distributed by: Metro-Goldwyn-Mayer
- Release date: January 31, 1953
- Language: English

Barney's Hungry Cousin is a 1953 MGM cartoon featuring Barney Bear. It is the 19th Barney Bear short. This cartoon is the first known mention of Jellystone National Park, which would go on to become the home of Hanna-Barbera's cartoon star Yogi Bear—who, like the title character in this short, has a penchant for stealing picnic baskets.

== Plot ==
As Barney Bear arrives at Jellystone National Park for a picnic, he is spotted by a resident wild bear. The bear quickly removes and buries all the "Do Not Feed The Bears" signs and proceeds to lay out a welcoming area for the unsuspecting Barney. As soon as Barney settles down to eat his stash, the wild bear keeps on stealing the food before Barney even has a chance to bite into it.

Barney tries his best to rid himself of the hungry bear, including driving to the top of a giant tree, feeding the bear dynamite, and throwing him off a cliff, chained inside a telephone booth. But the peckish pest outwits Barney every time and continues to gobble up his food.

Frustrated, Barney eventually gives up and decides to just hand over his last sandwich to the hungry bear. Strangely, the bear refuses to accept it, and instead proceeds to put up the "Do Not Feed The Bears" signs he had previously buried. He then whistles loudly on a whistle, summoning the "U.S. Rangers Anti-Bear Feeding Patrol", who arrive swiftly and arrest Barney, imprisoning him in their armored truck.

Finally Barney, inside the armored truck, takes out a lollipop from his coat, but before he can lick it, it is snatched from him by none other than the hungry bear who turns out to be the driver of the armored truck.

== See also ==
- The Bear That Couldn't Sleep
- Bah Wilderness
- Goggle Fishing Bear
- Wee-Willie Wildcat
- Bird-Brain Bird Dog
- The Fishing Bear
