= Cowslip =

Cowslip may refer to:

== Plants ==
- Primula veris, an Old World flowering plant commonly known as cowslip, common cowslip, or cowslip primrose (syn. Primula officinalis),
- Primula deorum, also known as Rila primrose, Rila cowslip or God's cowslip, alpine flower native to Bulgaria
- Primula florindae, a flowering plant known as giant cowslip and Tibetan cowslip, native to southeastern Tibet
- Primula sikkimensis, a flowering plant known as Himalayan cowslip and Sikkim cowslip
- Caltha palustris, a northern hemisphere flowering plant known as marsh marigold, kingcup and in America sometimes as cowslip
- Pulmonaria angustifolia, blue cowslip or narrow-leaved lungwort of central/northern Europe

== Naval ships ==
- USCGC Cowslip (WLB-277), a sea going buoy tender
- USS Cowslip (1863), a United States Navy steamship
- HMS Cowslip, a Flower-class corvette commissioned 9 August 1941 and scrapped in 1949

== Other uses ==
- Cowslip (racehorse), a competitor in the 1836 Grand National
- Cowslip (Watership Down), a rabbit in the novel Watership Down
- Cowslip (bovine podiatry), a tough plastic shoe used to treat lameness in cattle
