= Billy Boy (1954 film) =

- Directed by: Planned by: Dick Lundy (unc.); Finished by: Tex Avery
- Story by: Heck Allen; Jack Cosgriff (unc.)
- Produced by: Fred Quimby
- Starring: Daws Butler (unc.)
- Music by: Scott Bradley
- Animation by: Michael Lah; Walter Clinton; Grant Simmons; Ray Patterson; Robert Bentley
- Layouts by: Ed Benedict (unc.)
- Backgrounds by: Vera Ohman (unc.)
- Color process: Technicolor
- Production company: MGM Cartoons
- Distributed by: Metro-Goldwyn-Mayer
- Release date: May 8, 1954
- Running time: 6:00
- Language: English

Billy Boy is a 1954 Southern Wolf animated short cartoon in the MGM cartoon Theatrical Series released by Metro-Goldwyn-Mayer, produced by Fred Quimby, and directed by Tex Avery.

== Plot ==
The Southern-accented Wolf is having breakfast on his farm when there is a knock on his door. A letter is pushed under it, which reads:

Please take care of my little Billy goat. P.S. You will have no trouble feeding him — HE EATS ANYTHING.

True to the letter's contents, the wolf opens the door and finds a basket with a baby goat, Billy, who walks around inside the wolf's house, eating anything in his path, such as the carpet, part of the sofa, the wallpaper, the calendar, the globe, the curtains, and the wolf's trousers. The wolf, here presented with palilalia, addresses the audience: "You know? Now there's a pretty hungry little billy goat-goat-goat-goat-goat-goat." Oblivious to Billy's limitless hunger, the wolf gives him a bottle of milk, but Billy spills the milk and eats the bottle, the pacifier, the cutlery and crockery (like a sandwich), the coffeepot (along with all the coffee inside it), and the napkin.

Realizing that Billy will be more than a handful to deal with, the wolf tries to tie him in the garden to a hook hammered into the ground, but Billy eats the rope and comically eats the top part of the wolf's shoe when he tries to stop him. The wolf checks his foot and finds all ten of his toes still there, to his relief. Billy then tries to eat the wolf's spare tire, but is unable to chew the rubber and ends up shaped like the tire as soon as he swallows it whole.

The wolf then tries tying Billy to the windmill, but once again, Billy eats not only the rope, but the entire windmill, leaving the blades spinning at the top even with no support. He then attempts to take him away in a wheelbarrow and release him into the wild, but Billy eats the wheelbarrow and the wheel. The wolf ties Billy to a kite and releases him into the sky, but Billy eats the kite, the string and starts chewing on the wolf's arm. Unaffected, the wolf merely tells him to stop. He wraps Billy in chains and tries to tie him to a tree on a small island, but Billy proceeds to eat some of the film itself.

Next, the wolf places Billy in the trunk of his car and tries to drive him somewhere, but Billy somehow eats his way through the car and ends up devouring the motor. The wolf then ties Billy to a horse and hits it on the bottom to make it run away and take Billy with it. However, Billy eats the horse's hair, and the angry horse returns to repeat the same tactic with the wolf, whose hair Billy eats as well. The wolf also returns, looks irritably at the horse and says "Copycat".

As a final attempt to rid himself of Billy for good, the wolf places pepper on a railroad track and has Billy eat the railway, following it all the way to California, which is 2360 miles away. With Billy gone, the wolf tucks himself into bed. That night, Billy returns, eating the other side of the railway and covered in stamps of all the States he crossed eating the railway. The wolf suddenly awakens to see that Billy has eaten his entire house. Feigning joy, the wolf welcomes Billy back but ties him to a rocket, which the wolf sends to the moon. Even this isn't enough to satisfy the little goat, as Billy then eats the moon, taking the moonlight along with it and leaving the Earth in darkness. The wolf lights a match and says "Goodnight, y'all-y'all-y'all-y'all" as the cartoon closes.

== Voice cast ==
- Daws Butler as The Southern Wolf
