= List of plants known as cowslip =

Cowslip is a common name for several plants and may refer to:

- Primula veris, a flowering plant commonly known as cowslip
- Primula deorum, a flowering plant known as God's cowslip and rila cowslip
- Primula florindae, a flowering plant known as giant cowslip and Tibetan cowslip
- Primula sikkimensis, a flowering plant known as Himalayan cowslip and Sikkim cowslip
- Caltha palustris, a flowering plant known as marsh marigold and sometimes as cowslip
- Pulmonaria angustifolia, blue cowslip or narrow-leaved lungwort
