= List of The Yogi Bear Show episodes =

The following is a list of episodes of The Yogi Bear Show, an American animated television series produced by Hanna-Barbera Productions. All the episodes were produced and directed by William Hanna and Joseph Barbera.

With the exception of the final episode, each episode consists of a Yogi Bear cartoon, a Snagglepuss cartoon, and a Yakky Doodle cartoon.

== Series overview ==
Season	Segments	Episodes	Originally released	
Season	Segments	Episodes	First released	Last released
1	48	16	January 30, 1961	May 15, 1961
2	49	17	September 16, 1961	January 6, 1962

== Episodes ==
- Cartoons:
  - YB = Yogi Bear
  - SP = Snagglepuss
  - YD = Yakky Doodle
- No. = Overall episode number
- Ep = Episode number by season

=== Season 1 (1961) ===
No. overall	No. in season	Title	Written by	Animation	Original release date
1	1	"Oinks and Boinks"	Warren Foster	Don Patterson	January 30, 1961
1	1	"Major Operation"	Michael Maltese	Lewis Marshall	January 30, 1961
1	1	"Out of Luck Duck"	Michael Maltese	Lewis Marshall	January 30, 1961
Oinks and Boinks (YB): Yogi and Boo Boo are tricked by the Three Little Pigs into moving into the straw house, then the wood house, just before each is blown down by the wolf.; Major Operation (SP): To avoid being ejected from the Adventurers Club, Major Minor tries to hunt Snagglepuss again, despite the fact that the lion is now in a zoo.; Out of Luck Duck (YD): Unable to keep up with the other migrating ducks, Yakky falls into Chopper's water dish and meets the bulldog for the first time.
2	2	"Booby Trapped Bear"	Warren Foster	Lewis Marshall	February 6, 1961
2	2	"Feud for Thought"	Michael Maltese	Brad Case	February 6, 1961
2	2	"Hop, Duck and Listen"	Michael Maltese	Hicks Lokey	February 6, 1961
Booby Trapped Bear (YB): After Yogi poses as a health inspector in order to take tourists' picnic baskets, Ranger Smith sets out some booby-trapped baskets to teach Yogi a lesson.; Feud for Thought (SP): Two hill people are competing for a woman's hand in marriage, and she says that she will choose the one who brings her a lion fur coat; naturally, the suitors both hunt Snagglepuss.; Hop, Duck and Listen (YD): Flying to Missouri, Yakky gets lost and finds himself in Australia, where he befriends a baby kangaroo who "adopts" him as his brother.
3	3	"Gleesome Threesome"	Warren Foster	Carlo Vinci	February 13, 1961
3	3	"Live and Lion"	Michael Maltese	Lewis Marshall	February 13, 1961
3	3	"Dog Flight"	Michael Maltese	Lewis Marshall	February 13, 1961
Gleesome Threesome (YB): Ranger Smith goes on vacation in Miami Beach, Florida; Yogi and Boo Boo mistakenly think that they are invited so they show up at Miami Beach and drives poor Ranger Smith out of his mind.; Live and Lion (SP): Finding Yakky Doodle hiding in his mailbox, Snagglepuss contemplates eating him, but instead finds himself protecting Yakky from duck hunters.; Dog Flight (YD): Learning that Chopper wishes he could fly, Yakky tries to teach him, with painful results.
4	4	"A Bear Pair"	Warren Foster	Kenneth Muse	February 20, 1961
4	4	"Fraidy Cat Lion"	Michael Maltese	Art Davis	February 20, 1961
4	4	"Easter Duck"	Warren Foster	Don Patterson	February 20, 1961
A Bear Pair (YB): Boo Boo enters a mail-in puzzle contest and wins a trip for two to Paris; he takes Yogi along, who causes havoc there.; Fraidy Cat Lion (SP): Snagglepuss shows up at the home of Mr. & Mrs. J. Evil Scientist, begging for food; J. Evil hires him to get rid of a mouse, which Junior had transformed into a giant.; Easter Duck (YD): A lady buys Yakky from a pet store as an Easter gift for her granddaughter; the lady's cat, however, has different plans for the duckling.
5	5	"Spy Guy"	Warren Foster	Ed Love	February 27, 1961
5	5	"Royal Ruckus"	Michael Maltese	Don Patterson	February 27, 1961
5	5	"Foxy Duck"	Michael Maltese	Art Davis	February 27, 1961
Spy Guy (YB): Ranger Smith has a system of closed-circuit cameras set up throughout Jellystone so he can keep an eye on Yogi.; Royal Ruckus (SP): In a Medieval kingdom, Snagglepuss tries to rescue the Queen, who has been kidnapped by Count Down.; Foxy Duck (YD): Fibber Fox (in his first appearance) disguises himself as Yakky's mother as part of a plot to get at the chickens in the henhouse Chopper is guarding.
6	6	"Do or Diet"	Warren Foster	Ed DeMattia	March 6, 1961
6	6	"The Roaring Lion"	Michael Maltese	Lewis Marshall	March 6, 1961
6	6	"Railroaded Duck"	Michael Maltese	William Keil	March 6, 1961
Do or Diet (YB): At Ranger Smith's request, a doctor tells Yogi that his health will be in jeopardy if he does not stick to a diet of nuts and berries.; The Roaring Lion (SP): A hungry Snagglepuss infiltrates a college because he heard they have "sheepskins", and he reasons that they must have sheep; he winds up being the quarterback of the football team.; Railroaded Duck (YD): Yakky and Chopper are traveling by train, and so is a cat who keeps trying to eat Yakky.
7	7	"Bears and Bees"	Warren Foster	Hicks Lokey	March 13, 1961
7	7	"Paws for Applause"	Michael Maltese	Don Patterson	March 13, 1961
7	7	"Duck Hunting"	Warren Foster	Robert Bentley	March 13, 1961
Bears and Bees (YB): Yogi finds a hollow log filled with bees' honey, and trades jars of it for goodies from the tourists.; Paws for Applause (SP): Snagglepuss gets a job as a television actor, but it turns out to be a lot rougher than he had expected.; Duck Hunting (YD): Duhh-glas the Dog is supposed to help his master hunt ducks, but the dog cannot stand to see Yakky get shot.
8	8	"Biggest Show Off on Earth"	Warren Foster	Ed DeMattia	March 20, 1961
8	8	"Knights and Daze"	Michael Maltese	Laverne Harding	March 20, 1961
8	8	"Whistle-Stop and Go"	Michael Maltese	Art Davis	March 20, 1961
Biggest Show Off on Earth (YB): An escaped circus bear trades places with Yogi; Yogi has a terrible time trying to perform dangerous acts, while the more feral circus bear proves to be impossible for the rangers to control.; Knights and Daze (SP): Hoping to become a member of King Arthur's Round Table, Snagglepuss does battle with the Stormy Knight.; Whistle-Stop and Go (YD): In gratitude for being released from a dog catcher's wagon, Chopper gives Yakky a whistle, which the duck uses to call for help when Fibber Fox tries to eat him.
9	9	"Genial Genie"	Warren Foster	Dick Lundy	March 27, 1961
9	9	"The Gangsters All Here"	Michael Maltese	Lewis Marshall	March 27, 1961
9	9	"Duck the Music"	Michael Maltese	C. L. Hartman	March 27, 1961
Genial Genie (YB): Yogi and Boo Boo find a lamp containing a genie, and Yogi wishes for a flying carpet.; The Gangsters All Here (SP): Two gangsters use Snagglepuss' cave as a hideout.; Duck the Music (YD): Yakky's terrible singing drives a cat to distraction.
10	10	"Cub Scout Boo Boo"	Warren Foster	Bob Carr	April 3, 1961
10	10	"Having a Bowl"	Michael Maltese	Art Davis	April 3, 1961
10	10	"School Fool"	Michael Maltese	William Keil	April 3, 1961
Cub Scout Boo Boo (YB): When a Boy Scout troop sets up camp in Jellystone, Yogi and Boo Boo pose as Scouts to get some food.; Having a Bowl (SP): The Major's baby nephew runs away from home, and when Snagglepuss brings him back, the Major attempts to shoot him.; School Fool (YD): Yakky goes to school and is picked on by a bigger kid; Chopper disguises himself as a student so he can keep an eye on Yakky.
11	11	"Home-Sweet Jellystone"	Warren Foster	Brad Case	April 10, 1961
11	11	"Diaper Desperado"	Michael Maltese	Robert Bentley	April 10, 1961
11	11	"Oh Duckter"	Michael Maltese	Allen Wilzbach	April 10, 1961
Home-Sweet Jellystone (YB): When he inherits wealth and a mansion, Ranger Smith moves away from Jellystone.; Diaper Desperado (SP): An outlaw called Big Hombre orders Snagglepuss to look after his baby, Little Hombre, while he goes off to rob a bank.; Oh Duckter (YD): Yakky visits Chopper in the animal hospital, and Fibber Fox sneaks in to try to catch Yakky.
12	12	"Love-Bugged Bear"	Warren Foster	Bob Carr	April 17, 1961
12	12	"Arrow Error"	Michael Maltese	Hicks Lokey	April 17, 1961
12	12	"It's a Duck's Life"	Michael Maltese	Art Davis	April 17, 1961
Love-Bugged Bear (YB): Yogi has been struck by Cupid's arrow (literally), and he is too busy pursuing a female bear to go after picnic baskets.; Arrow Error (SP): Inspired by the story of Robin Hood, Snagglepuss sets out to be a champion for all in need – including an elephant who has escaped from the zoo.; It's a Duck's Life (YD): Chopper's master is going duck hunting, and Chopper is trying to keep Yakky from being shot.
13	13	"Bearface Disguise"	Warren Foster	Art Davis	April 24, 1961
13	13	"Twice Shy"	Michael Maltese	Phil Duncan	April 24, 1961
13	13	"Happy Birthdaze"	Michael Maltese	C. L. Hartman	April 24, 1961
Bearface Disguise (YB): Ranger Smith disguises himself as a polar bear to do a test on Yogi.; Twice Shy (SP): The Major's identical twin brother, Sir Clyde, believes that all animals should be free; Snagglepuss is confused when the Major keeps locking him in a cage and Sir Clyde keeps freeing him.; Happy Birthdaze (YD): Yakky gets a birthday present for Chopper – a dinosaur bone from a museum.
14	14	"Slap Happy Birthday"	Warren Foster	George Nicholas	May 1, 1961
14	14	"Cloak and Stagger"	Michael Maltese	Hicks Lokey	May 1, 1961
14	14	"Horse Collared"	Michael Maltese	Hicks Lokey	May 1, 1961
Slap Happy Birthday (YB): Ranger Smith is trying to find out what Yogi is up to, not realizing that the bear is putting together a surprise birthday party for him.; Cloak and Stagger (SP): When Snagglepuss tries to join the Three Musketeers, they trick him into thinking that the king is a spy.; Horse Collared (YD): A farmer's old plow-horse mistakenly thinks that the farmer wants to shoot him, so Yakky helps him hide.
15	15	"A Bear Living"	Warren Foster	Art Davis	May 8, 1961
15	15	"Remember Your Lions"	Michael Maltese	Gil Turner	May 8, 1961
15	15	"Ha-Choo to You!"	Michael Maltese	Ralph Somerville	May 8, 1961
A Bear Living (YB): Yogi sets up a wishing well in the park, and uses the money people throw in to buy things.; Remember Your Lions (SP): Snagglepuss finally gets to perform Shakespeare on stage, but Major Minor is sitting in the audience and he interrupts his performance.; Ha-Choo to You! (YD): Chopper has a cold, so Yakky brings him a basket full of goodies, which Fibber Fox tries to intercept (in the style of "Little Red Riding Hood").
16	16	"Disguise and Gals"	Warren Foster	Don Patterson	May 15, 1961
16	16	"Remember the Daze"	Michael Maltese	William Keil	May 15, 1961
16	16	"Foxy Proxy"	Michael Maltese	Dick Lundy	May 15, 1961
Disguise and Gals (YB): Two bank robbers disguised as little old ladies hide out in Jellystone and conceal their loot in a picnic basket; naturally, Yogi gets involved.; Remember the Daze (SP): The Major and Snagglepuss are guests on a television show called This Is Your Strife (a parody of This Is Your Life), and the former chases the latter through various TV studios, including the one Yogi Bear's show is in. This cartoon also includes parodies of You Bet Your Life, Western shows, game shows, Frankenstein, and science fiction shows.; Foxy Proxy (YD): When Yakky thinks that Fibber Fox is his mother, the fox finds that he cannot bring himself to eat the duckling; this drives Fibber to see a psychiatrist.

=== Season 2 (1961–62) ===
No. overall	No. in season	Title	Written by	Animation	Original release date
17	1	"Touch and Go-Go-Go"	Warren Foster	Bob Carr	September 16, 1961
17	1	"Express Trained Lion"	Michael Maltese	Laverne Harding	September 16, 1961
17	1	"Count to Tenant"	Michael Maltese	Robert Bentley	September 16, 1961
Touch and Go-Go-Go (YB): The bears' fairy godmother grants Yogi the power to turn anything he touches into a picnic basket (à la Midas).; Express Trained Lion (SP): A mouse named Bigelow, whom Snagglepuss once freed from a mousetrap, is intent on freeing Snag from a zookeeper, despite the fact that the lion does not want to be freed. The main action takes place on a train, hence the title.; Count to Tenant (YD): After a flea named Clarence is "evicted" from a dog's hide, kind-hearted Yakky offers to let the flea live on Chopper.
18	2	"Acrobatty Yogi"	Warren Foster	Robert Bentley	September 23, 1961
18	2	"Jangled Jungle"	Michael Maltese	Don Patterson	September 23, 1961
18	2	"Shrunken Headache"	Tony Benedict	Carlo Vinci	September 23, 1961
Acrobatty Yogi (YB): Cindy Bear (in her first appearance) is in a circus, so Yogi runs off to join it; the circus owner gets him a job as a lion tamer.; Jangled Jungle (SP): Sick and tired of being part of a lion taming act, Snagglepuss runs away from the circus and goes back to the jungle, expecting to be the king of the beasts.* Shrunken Headache (YD): Using a child's chemistry set, Fibber Fox creates a formula that shrinks Chopper down to Yakky's size, and the fox chases after the two of them.
19	3	"Ring-a-Ding Picnic Basket"	Warren Foster	Lewis Marshall	September 30, 1961
19	3	"Lion Tracks"	Michael Maltese	Hicks Lokey	September 30, 1961
19	3	"The Most Ghost"	Michael Maltese	Allen Wilzbach	September 30, 1961
Ring-a-Ding Picnic Basket (YB): Ranger Smith tries to trap Yogi with an alarm-rigged picnic basket, and his plan fails; Later, Yogi mistakenly thinks the Ranger wants him shot.; Lion Tracks (SP): A railroad company tries to put a track through Snagglepuss' cave, but Snag thwarts their efforts; the railroad then hires Major Minor to handle the situation.; The Most Ghost (YD): Chopper and Yakky stay in an abandoned house for the night; Fibber Fox disguises himself as a ghost, hoping to scare Chopper away so he can catch Yakky.
20	4	"Iron Hand Jones"	Warren Foster	William Keil	October 7, 1961
20	4	"Fight Fright"	Michael Maltese	Bob Carr	October 7, 1961
20	4	"Stamp Scamp"	Michael Maltese	C. L. Hartman	October 7, 1961
Iron Hand Jones (YB): When Ranger Smith goes on vacation, his seat is filled by an Army Ranger named "Iron Hand" Jones, who is an ex-paratrooper and more strict than Yogi can stand.; Fight Fright (SP): At the county fair, Snagglepuss is tired of being the target in an "African dodger" type of game; he is talked into boxing with a kangaroo instead.; Stamp Scamp (YD): Chopper gives Yakky a trading stamp so his book will be completely filled, but a wind keeps blows the stamp away from them.
21	5	"Yogi's Pest Guest"	Warren Foster	Don Williams	October 14, 1961
21	5	"Lions Share Sheriff"	Michael Maltese	George Nicholas	October 14, 1961
21	5	"All's Well That Eats Well"	Tony Benedict	Carlo Vinci	October 14, 1961
Yogi's Pest Guest (YB): Yo Yo, a Japanese bear who is a martial artist, is transferred to Jellystone, and Yogi finds him in his cave and to become friends, he gets him a picnic basket and Yo Yo becomes addicted to picnic baskets.; Lions Share Sheriff (SP): An outlaw is intent on shooting the sheriff of a Western town; after their sheriff runs away, the people appoint Snagglepuss their sheriff.; All's Well That Eats Well (YD): Alfy Gator (in his first appearance) tries to catch Yakky so the 'gator can dine on roast duck.
22	6	"Missile Bound Yogi"	Warren Foster	C. L. Hartman	October 21, 1961
22	6	"Cagey Lion"	Michael Maltese	Laverne Harding	October 21, 1961
22	6	"Foxy Friends"	Michael Maltese	Bob Carr	October 21, 1961
Missile Bound Yogi (YB): The army has its war games in a sealed-off part of the park; when Yogi wanders in, he thinks Jellystone has been invaded.; Cagey Lion (SP): Snagglepuss is being transported to the zoo on a riverboat; he escapes from his cage and poses as a riverboat gambler.; Foxy Friends (YD): Bigelow the Mouse (from the Snagglepuss cartoon "Express Trained Lion") helps Yakky to stay out of Fibber Fox's clutches.
23	7	"Loco Locomotive"	Warren Foster	Kenneth Muse	October 28, 1961
23	7	"Charge That Lion"	Michael Maltese	Art Davis	October 28, 1961
23	7	"Mad Mix Up"	Michael Maltese	Bob Carr	October 28, 1961
Loco Locomotive (YB): When a kiddie train is added to the park, Yogi becomes determined to ride it.; Charge That Lion (SP): To evade hunters, Snagglepuss disguises himself as a soldier and winds up in an army camp.; Mad Mix Up (YD): A mad scientist switches Chopper's and Yakky's brains, and the two of them drive Fibber Fox crazy.
24	8	"Missile-Bound Bear"	Warren Foster	William Keil	November 4, 1961
24	8	"Be My Ghost"	Michael Maltese	C. L. Hartman	November 4, 1961
24	8	"Beach Brawl"	Michael Maltese	Don Patterson	November 4, 1961
Missile-Bound Bear (YB): The military builds a secret rocket-launching base in Jellystone, and Yogi, Boo Boo, and Ranger Smith all wind up inside a space-bound rocket. This cartoon contains a great deal of satire of the military.; Be My Ghost (SP): Snagglepuss visits an old English castle, which is haunted by a pair of mischievous ghosts.; Beach Brawl (YD): Yakky and Chopper enjoy a day at the beach, until Fibber Fox starts chasing after Yakky again.
25	9	"A Wooin' Bruin"	Warren Foster	Bob Carr	November 11, 1961
25	9	"Spring Hits a Snag"	Michael Maltese	Ken Southworth	November 11, 1961
25	9	"Duck Seasoning"	Tony Benedict	Don Williams	November 11, 1961
A Wooin' Bruin (YB): Yogi and another bear compete for Cindy's affections by bringing her gifts, committing a rash of thefts throughout the park in the process.; Spring Hits a Snag (SP): Snagglepuss protects a lioness named Lila (in her first appearance) from hunters by giving her shelter in his cave, but he soon finds her company less bearable than the hunters' bullets.; Duck Seasoning (YD): Alfy Gator is hunting Yakky again; in this cartoon, Yakky is unusually self-reliant as he fights back against Alfy.
26	10	"Yogi in the City"	Warren Foster	Ed Love	November 18, 1961
26	10	"Legal Eagle Lion"	Michael Maltese	Jack Carr	November 18, 1961
26	10	"Hasty Tasty"	Tony Benedict	Clarke Mallery	November 18, 1961
Yogi in the City (YB): After falling asleep in a tourist's trailer because of a drip in his cave, Yogi finds himself in the big city dodging cars and wounding up on the ledge of a building.; Legal Eagle Lion (SP): A circuit judge is afraid to try a bank robber in a rough Western town, so Snagglepuss steps in as judge, prosecutor, and a pair of witnesses.; Hasty Tasty (YD): Fibber Fox and Alfy Gator are both after Yakky, and the two of them fight over who is going to get him.
27	11	"Queen Bee for a Day"	Warren Foster	Don Williams	November 25, 1961
27	11	"Don't Know It Poet"	Michael Maltese	Allen Wilzbach	November 25, 1961
27	11	"Nobody Home Duck"	Michael Maltese	Robert Bentley	November 25, 1961
Queen Bee for a Day (YB): Yogi has Boo Boo dress up as a queen bee to lure bees away from their honey-filled hive, but an entomologist starts chasing Boo Boo.; Don't Know It Poet (SP): In this takeoff of Cyrano de Bergerac, professional poet Cyril D. Snagglepuss is hired to help a suitor win a lady's heart, but something has gone wrong.; Nobody Home Duck (YD): Yakky's wings are too weak to take him south for the impending winter, so Chopper tries to find him a home.
28	12	"Batty Bear"	Warren Foster	Robert Bentley	December 2, 1961
28	12	"Tail Wag Snag"	Michael Maltese	Allen Wilzbach	December 2, 1961
28	12	"Dog Pounded"	Tony Benedict	Hicks Lokey	December 2, 1961
Batty Bear (YB): After sending in thousands of boxtops to a television show, Yogi receives a "Bat Guy" costume with functional bat-like wings, which he uses to swoop down on campers and steal their picnic baskets.; Tail Wag Snag (SP): Major Minor tries again to catch Snagglepuss, this time with the aid of Snuffles.; Dog Pounded (YD): Fibber Fox steals Chopper's dog tags and gets him captured by the dog catcher, thus leaving Yakky defenseless.
29	13	"Droop-a-Long Yogi"	Warren Foster	Ralph Somerville	December 9, 1961
29	13	"Rent and Rave"	Michael Maltese	Jack Ozarks	December 9, 1961
29	13	"Witch Duck-ter"	Michael Maltese	Don Towsley	December 9, 1961
Droop-a-Long Yogi (YB): A television station is using part of Jellystone to shoot a Western program, and Yogi and Ranger Smith get parts on the show.; Rent and Rave (SP): To raise money for a trip, Snagglepuss rents out part of his cave, but his new tenant – Lila – (who is colored yellow) is more than he can stand.; Witch Duck-ter (YD): A witch is brewing a special recipe to celebrate her 110th birthday, and one of the ingredients is Yakky.
30	14	"Threadbare Bear"	Warren Foster	Robert Bentley	December 16, 1961
30	14	"Footlight Fright"	Michael Maltese	Robert Bentley	December 16, 1961
30	14	"Full Course Meal"	Tony Benedict	Don Towsley	December 16, 1961
Threadbare Bear (YB): While being transported to the zoo, Yogi and Boo Boo escape into the woods, and start stealing food from stores and houses. The zoo they are intended to be transported to is the Cincinnati Zoo – coincidentally, Hanna-Barbera would be purchased by the Cincinnati-based Taft Broadcasting in 1967.; Footlight Fright (SP): Major Minor uses psychology to capture Snagglepuss, by playing on his dreams of becoming an actor.; Full Course Meal (YD): Alfy Gator invites Yakky to dinner, without mentioning that the duckling will be the main course; Yakky, however, brings his friend Chopper with him.
31	15	"Ice Box Raider"	Warren Foster	N/A	December 23, 1961
31	15	"One Two Many"	Michael Maltese	Don Towsley	December 23, 1961
31	15	"Baddie Buddies"	Tony Benedict	Dick Lundy	December 23, 1961
Ice Box Raider (YB): To prove that Yogi has been raiding his refrigerator, Ranger Smith rigs it with a practical joke; later, Yogi hatches a plan to get even.; One Two Many (SP): Snagglepuss' identical twin brother Snaggletooth comes to stay for the summer, and the two of them inadvertently confuse Lila.; Baddie Buddies (YD): Lost in the desert, Yakky tries to be friends with a dangerous outlaw, and his attentions prove to be detrimental to the outlaw.
32	16	"Bear Foot Soldiers"	Warren Foster	Robert Bentley	December 30, 1961
32	16	"Royal Rodent"	Michael Maltese	Dick Lundy	December 30, 1961
32	16	"Judo Ex-Expert"	Michael Maltese	Harry Holt	December 30, 1961
Bear Foot Soldiers (YB): The army is playing war games in Jellystone, and one of the teams is disguising their soldiers as bears; of course, Yogi and Boo Boo get caught up in the games.; Royal Rodent (SP): The king hires Snagglepuss to rid his castle of Bigelow the Mouse.; Judo Ex-Expert (YD): Yakky believes that he is now a Judo expert, and tries to fight Fibber Fox; Chopper secretly lends a hand.
33	17	"Yogi's Birthday Party"	Warren Foster	Dick Lundy (supervisor)	January 6, 1962
In this episode-length cartoon, Yogi is told that he will be appearing on a television program. He tries to prepare for the show by taking lessons from Fred Upstairs, Boppy Barrin, and Lee B. Rocky (spoofs of Fred Astaire, Bobby Darin, and Liberace, respectively), but the lessons do not go well. Yogi is afraid that he will ruin the show, but at the last minute he discovers that it is actually a surprise birthday tribute for him and that he does not have to do anything. The "guests" who show up to honor Yogi include Ranger Smith, Huckleberry Hound, Quick Draw McGraw and Baba Looey, Pixie and Dixie and Mr. Jinks, Snooper and Blabber, Snagglepuss, Hokey Wolf and Ding-A-Ling, Augie Doggie and Doggie Daddy, Cindy Bear, Boo Boo, and Yakky Doodle.
