= The Farm of Tomorrow =

1954 animated short film

- Directed by: Tex Avery
- Story by: Heck Allen
- Produced by: Fred Quimby
- Starring: June Foray; Tex Avery
- Narrated by: Paul Frees; Billy Bletcher; Colleen Collins
- Music by: Scott Bradley
- Animation by: Robert Bentley; Walter Clinton; Michael Lah; Grant Simmons
- Layouts by: Gene Hazelton
- Backgrounds by: Joe Montell
- Color process: Technicolor
- Production company: Metro-Goldwyn-Mayer cartoon studio
- Distributed by: Metro-Goldwyn-Mayer
- Release date: September 18, 1954
- Running time: 6 minutes
- Country: United States
- Language: English

The Farm of Tomorrow is a 1954 one-reel animated short subject directed by Tex Avery and produced by Fred Quimby. It was released theatrically with the feature filmmovie Rogue Cop on 18 September 1954 and distributed by Metro-Goldwyn-Mayer.

This cartoon is one of Avery's future technology cartoons including The House of Tomorrow, The Car of Tomorrow and T.V. of Tomorrow.

== Summary ==
The narrator (voiced by Paul Frees) introduces the Farm of Tomorrow, a wonderland of modern and mechanical inventions together with the advanced scientifically improved livestock.

A series of gags showing how much more productive farms would be if farmers started crossbreeding their animals to create weird (but very useful) hybrids.

Each of the inventions and hybrids are explained:

- In the old days, hatching eggs would take 3 weeks. A toaster-like incubator that hatches chicks requires only a few seconds. It is mentioned that caution should be used in setting the selector: set it to dark and the chicks come up black.
- Another problem in the old days would be the grading of eggs for size. A pinball machine-like egg grader was created for this purpose. One small egg rolls through the machine and hatches a small chick who runs back inside the machine calling for his mom.
- Picking up corn used to waste vast amounts of energy, so corn was crossed with Mexican jumping beans; they jump directly into the chicken's mouth.
- A chicken was crossed with a talking parrot, with the result that the hybrid (voiced by June Foray) lays an egg and shouts "Come and get it!"
- A chicken was crossed with an ostrich to provide bigger drumsticks.
- A chicken was crossed with a centipede to get more drumsticks.
- To increase egg production, a chicken was crossed with a slot machine. A farmer lifts the chicken's left wing and eggs are released, which the farmer collects.
- To guarantee absolute freshness in every egg, a full-proof Smell-O-Meter was created. A rotten egg is detected and discarded. It subsequently hatches a small skunk.
- To solve the fly problem around the dairy, a cow was crossed with a beaver. The beaver tail is perfect for swatting flies.
- Milking the cow had, in the past, taken much of the farmer's valuable time. To speed things up, a cow was crossed with a kangaroo. A milkman retrieves milk bottles from its pouch.
- A silkworm was crossed with a garter snake resulting in a beautiful calf (a woman's).
- A female narrator (voiced by Colleen Collins) talks about how a Hampshire hog was crossed with a kitchen sink to create a garbage disposal unit for the ladies.
- The female narrator talks about how, for lady flower lovers, a shaded buttercup was crossed with a milkweed to create a pink cowslip (a literal cow in a literal slip).
- Speaking of the new look in poultry, a duck was crossed with a banana. "You don't have to pick him girls, just peel him!"
- No more frostbitten fruit for the citrus farmer because an orange was crossed with a fir tree. This gives the orange a fur coat.
- For frustrated grocers, a tomato was crossed with a grapefruit to discourage the vegetable-squeezing customers. A female shopper squeezes this hybrid, which squirts juice in her face.
- An umbrella was crossed with a Christmas tree to solve the annual problem on what to do with the tree after Christmas.
- For the apartment dweller with limited garden space, a potluck multi-plant was perfected.
- For the sheep ranchers, a lamb was crossed with a dachshund, giving it five yards more wool per sheep.
- Sheep shearing was simplified; a sheep was crossed with a pair of long underwear to produce long underwear-like wool. The farmer uses a plank to knock the sheep out of that wool.
- For the $2.00 betters, a giraffe was crossed with a racehorse. "He's a cinch to win by a neck!" This is seen when the hybrid lowers its neck as the racers approach the finish line.
- A stork was crossed with a stag elk to accommodate the impatient newlyweds who can't wait to have a big family. There are 13 babies being carried in its antlers.

Before ending the cartoon, the male narrator talks to the viewers about the animals in the Reject Barn who are in need of a home. They consist of:

- A dove crossed with a high chair to make a stool pigeon.
- A 10 ft (3.0 m) pole crossed with a cat to make a 10 ft. polecat.
- An owl crossed with a billy goat to make a hootenanny.
