= T.V. of Tomorrow =

1953 film by Tex Avery

- Directed by: Tex Avery
- Story by: Heck Allen
- Produced by: Fred Quimby
- Starring: Daws Butler; Dave O'Brien
- Narrated by: Paul Frees; John Brown
- Music by: Scott Bradley
- Animation by: Michael Lah; Ray Patterson; Robert Bentley; Walter Clinton; Grant Simmons
- Color process: Technicolor
- Production company: MGM Cartoons
- Distributed by: Metro-Goldwyn-Mayer
- Release date: June 6, 1953
- Running time: 7:00
- Language: English

T.V. of Tomorrow is a 1953 animated theatrical short directed by Tex Avery. It was produced by Fred Quimby and released by Metro-Goldwyn-Mayer on June 6, 1953.

== Production ==
It was part of series of cartoons Avery did satirizing technology of the future that included The House of Tomorrow, The Car of Tomorrow and The Farm of Tomorrow. These were parodies of live-action promotional films that were commonly shown in theaters at the time.

The short is narrated showcase of different kinds of Television sets of the future, most of them solving normal problems with T.V.'s, like picture distortions or mobility.

== Summary ==
The cartoon begins with "Your Town, U.S.A.", a quiet, peaceful neighborhood as explained by the narrator (voiced by Paul Frees). But overnight, television mania takes over the town, flooding the rooftops with TV antennas. However as the narrator explains, television comes with problems: eye strain, image distortion, and picture jumping. But these problems will be eliminated by the "Television sets of tomorrow":

- A set that is part television / part stove so you will not have to drag Dad away from the TV for dinner. But actually as the narrator says, the house of tomorrow will be built around the TV.
- A set that gets rid of picture distortion caused by passing airplanes by shooting down the planes. However, a drawback to this is that the living room becomes cluttered with crashed planes.
- A set with "one simple knob" to control the TV, instead of the billion that came before (However, the knob is just as complicated).
- A set with a long, small horizontal screen for people who squint.
- A set with a built-in water cooler for people who drink a lot of water.
- A lighter with a built-in TV screen for those who smoke. The cartoon also explains that 4 out of 5 people now own televisions (a line up of five people show that four of them look extremely tired).
- A set with a windshield wiper to clear up fuzzy distortion.
- A model with a built-in repair man.
- A set for that "never satisfied know-it-all" who thinks he can tune your set better than you (a gun pops out of the TV and shoots him).
- A set with an indoor aerial.
- A "watch-while-you-wash" model - a washing machine with a TV screen on the door that tilts back and forth (The face on the screen is Tex Avery himself).
- A "contract console" ("for that fourth at bridge") that shuffles cards for any card game.
- A model for the bathroom with a "turn-about screen" to avoid people on the screen (Dave O'Brien) watching you.
- A set with a built-in garbage disposal for lengthy commercials.
- A new color TV that's half-paid for - so one side of the screen is in color while the other is in black and white.
- The next scene talks about the "tremendous variety of programs" to choose from. However, a man at home discovers that all of the channels are showing westerns. He is so angry, he smashes the screen with his fist and goes to a local movie theater that's showing a romance called "My Beloved" which turns out to be a western.
- A set for the busy barber who is so distracted by the TV, he cuts all the hair off his female assistant instead of the customer.
- A set with a screen in the shape of a keyhole for "Peeping Toms".
- A "Thrifty Scotsman" model in the shape of a flashlight.
- A bachelor's model with a "new low for plunging necklines", where the bottom of the screen resembles an outline of a bust.
- For businessmen who don't have the time for fishing trips, this set has a lake on the screen for you to fish in which pulls one man in.
- A "Santa Anita" TV designed for businessmen who enjoy betting on horse racing. The lower cabinet holds a gambling station.
- A "Las Vegas special" which has three screens so you can gamble on your channels.
- A model with two screens, upper and lower, so you can see all of the picture.

Finally, the short ends with a direct telecast from Mars. A TV in an observatory has millions of scientists gather around the screen as the planet becomes more visible. Finally, the picture is revealed to be the western we saw earlier.

== Voice cast ==
- Paul Frees as The Narrator / Future Narrator (at the end)
- John Brown as The Mission Control Operator ("Come in Mars... We're getting a picture" etc.) / The Narrator (One Scene: "The Las Vegas Special")
- Daws Butler as The Gambler
- Dave O'Brien as himself (in the TV screen)

== See also ==
- United States in the 1950s
- Modernist film
- Social effects of television
