= 6,000 Enemies =

1939 film by George B. Seitz

- US film poster
- Directed by: George B. Seitz
- Written by: Wilmon Menard; Leo L. Stanley
- Produced by: Lucien Hubbard
- Starring: Walter Pidgeon; Rita Johnson
- Cinematography: John F. Seitz
- Edited by: Conrad A. Nervig
- Music by: Edward Ward
- Distributed by: Metro-Goldwyn-Mayer
- Release date: June 9, 1939
- Running time: 62 minutes
- Country: United States
- Language: English
- Budget: $204,000
- Box office: $358,000

6,000 Enemies is a 1939 American drama film directed by George B. Seitz and starring Walter Pidgeon as a successful District Attorney who is framed on charge of bribery. Although innocent, he is sent to prison where he fights to clear his name. The film also stars Rita Johnson.

== Plot summary ==
Steve Donegan is an elected district attorney and launches an anti-organized crime campaign. Joe Silenus, a crime boss, plots to frame Donegan for accepting a bribe. Donegan is sentenced to prison, where he re-encounters all the men he convicted during his anti-crime crusade. Martin receives orders to eliminate Donegan. Anne Barry, the embezzlement convict, saves his life by alerting the guards to her screams.

Steve’s brother pursues Silenus, disguised as a chauffeur in order to prove his innocence. ‘Socks’ Martin knocks Steve Donegan down six times, but he keeps getting up and fighting. Two revolvers are smuggled into the prison inside a fruit basket meant for the warden. ‘Socks suggests that Steve join him in the prison break. When Phil arrives at the prison to see Steve, he is shot in the drive by just outside the gates. The prisoners riot as a result of the shots, and the rumored prison break begins.

== Cast ==
- Walter Pidgeon as Steve Donegan
- Rita Johnson as Anne Barry
- Paul Kelly as Dr. Malcolm Scott
- Nat Pendleton as 'Socks' Martin
- Harold Huber as Joe Silenus
- Grant Mitchell as Warden Alvin Parkhurst
- John Arledge as Phil Donegan
- J.M. Kerrigan as Dan Barrett
- Adrian Morris as 'Bull' Snyder
- Guinn 'Big Boy' Williams as Maxie (as Guinn Williams)
- Arthur Aylesworth as 'Bluebeard' Dawson
- Raymond Hatton as Prisoner 'Wibbie' Yern
- Lionel Royce as Prisoner 'Dutch' Myers
- Tom Neal as Prisoner Ransom
- Willie Fung as Wang

== Box office ==
According to MGM records, the film earned $233,000 in the US and Canada and $125,000 elsewhere, resulting in a profit of $22,000. It also featured the short "The Bear That Couldn't Sleep", which was the first Barney Bear short.
