= Feud for Thought =

Feud for Thought may refer to:

- "Feud for Thought" (Home Improvement)
- "Feud for Thought" (Sylvanian Families)
- "Feud for Thought" (Time Squad)
- "Feud for Thought", an episode of Laurel and Hardy
- "Feud for Thought", a Snagglepuss episode of The Yogi Bear Show
