= The Prospecting Bear =

1941 film by Rudolf Ising

- Directed by: Rudolf Ising
- Produced by: Rudolf Ising; Fred Quimby (uncredited)
- Music by: Scott Bradley (uncredited)
- Color process: Technicolor
- Production company: Metro-Goldwyn-Mayer
- Distributed by: Loew's, Inc.
- Release date: March 8, 1941
- Running time: 8 min
- Country: United States
- Language: English

The Prospecting Bear is a 1941 American animated short film directed by Rudolf Ising. It is the third appearance of the then-unnamed Barney Bear.

== Plot ==
Barney Bear searches for gold during a gold rush while a mule carries his equipment. He accidentally leaves behind the gear to Barney's chagrin. He quickly finds a gold deposit behind a small hole but is betrayed by his unwieldy pickaxe. He finds the mule eating dynamite and attempts to blow up the hole, but it is too weak to make any impact. He accidentally lights up the box of dynamite and wastes them. He finds the mule sniffing TNT and takes the barrel of TNT, unknowingly spilling some into his pants. While Barney uses the rest of his explosives, the mule eats more dynamite and sends himself and Barney into the gold deposit, which is destroyed as Barney furiously sulks on top of the remains of the area he was on, unable to get down.
