= The House of Tomorrow (1949 film) =

- Directed by: Tex Avery
- Story by: Jack Cosgriff; Rich Hogan
- Produced by: Fred Quimby
- Starring: Frank Graham; Tex Avery; Joi Lansing
- Narrated by: Frank Graham; Don Messick
- Music by: Scott Bradley
- Animation by: Walter Clinton; Michael Lah; Grant Simmons
- Color process: Technicolor
- Production company: MGM cartoon studio
- Distributed by: Metro-Goldwyn-Mayer
- Release date: June 11, 1949
- Running time: 7:00
- Language: English

The House of Tomorrow is a 1949 animated theatrical short directed by Tex Avery. It was part of a series of cartoons Avery did satirizing technology of the future which included: The Car of Tomorrow, The T.V. of Tomorrow, and The Farm of Tomorrow. These were spoofs of live-action promotional films that were commonly shown in theaters at the time.

The film is a straightforward narrated showcase of appliances said to be found in a typical house in the year 2050, roughly a hundred years after the cartoon was made, each one actually an outlandish joke. Most of the time, the inventions follow a similar pattern of being made for each member of the family, but ending with a fatal version for the "mother-in-law".

== Plot ==
An off-screen narrator introduces The House of Tomorrow, a pre-fabricated luxury residence that unfolds from a tiny gift box. The house has separate entrances for each member of the family: for Fido, a tiny door surrounded by bones; for Junior, a door covered in muddy handprints; for the mother, a wide and curvy door to accommodate her large form from eating sweets; for the father, a saloon door; and, for the mother-in-law, a heavily barricaded door with a welcome mat that reads "SCRAM!"

Once inside, the narrator offers a tour of the house's modern conveniences, presented as a series of brief vignettes consisting of sight gags. The house contains all of the following:

- Carpeting so lush and deep that a passing butler sinks into it up to his neck.
- A climate control system that, with the push of a button, sends a raining thundercloud across the room
- A trophy room where animal heads share space with a liquor bottle that was "killed" one New Year's Eve.
- A button to fool tax assessors by transforming the home's appearance and its inhabitants into that of a dilapidated hovel resided in by poor people.
- A machine to handle Junior's nonstop questions by yelling "Ahh, shaddap!" and plugging his mouth with a toilet plunger.
- An automatic sandwich maker that shuffles slices of bread and cold cuts like playing cards before "dealing" the sandwiches to diners.
- A tanning machine that flips the user with a giant spatula.
- A guest chair that can adjust its shape for any visitor, whether tall, short, or the mother-in law (for her, it transforms into an electric chair).
- A three-screen television set the whole family can watch at once: a cooking show for the mother, a western for Junior, and, for the "tired businessman," a film of a beautiful woman (Joi Lansing) in a bathing suit.
- Individual medicine cabinets for each member of the family; the father's and mother's are filled with various hygiene implements, Junior's contains a single large bottle of castor oil with a spoon, and the mother-in-law's is filled with vials of poison.
- An electric shaver that can remove not only stubble, but also almost all of a man's facial features.
- A toaster that pops its users up in the air instead of the toast.
- A juicer that removes the seeds from oranges by noisily spitting them into a spittoon.
- A frying pan that prevents bacon from curling by hitting it with a tiny mallet.
- An oven with a window to let one see everything inside (a roasting chicken screams for its modesty and pulls down a blind).
- A device to remove the burps from radishes by pressing each one as it passes through, forcing out a literal burping sound.
- A pressure cooker that can cook an entire meal at once; it's shown that it does so via the heat from a catastrophic explosion which sends all the food airborne, along with the stunned housewife herself.
- A refrigerator with a built-in window for those curious about whether the light turns off when the door is closed. It reveals a little gnome-like creature pushing an "off" button each time.

As the narrator signs off, a typewritten letter suddenly appears on the screen:

PATRONS ATTENTION!!
Due to numerous requests of the tired business-men in the audience, we are going to show you the girl again.
The Management

The short then ends with a repeat of the film of Joi Lansing in her swimsuit.

== Voice Cast ==
- Frank Graham as The Narrator / Child Silencing Machine ("Ahhh shut up!")
- Don Messick as The Narrator of The Pressure Cooker Sequence (since Frank Graham was unavailable for pick ups).
- Tex Avery as The Burp Remover
- Joi Lansing as Woman on TV (in Live-Action)

It is unknown who voiced The Bratty Child.

== Credits ==
- Director: Tex Avery
- Story: Jack Cosgriff, Rich Hogan
- Animation: Walter Clinton, Michael Lah, Grant Simmons
- Music: Scott Bradley
- Producer: Fred Quimby

== See also ==
- What's Buzzin' Buzzard - A previous cartoon that also had a "Patrons Attention" at the end of it.
