= A Good Time for a Dime =

1941 Donald Duck cartoon

- Theatrical release poster
- Directed by: Dick Lundy
- Produced by: Walt Disney
- Starring: Clarence Nash
- Music by: Leigh Harline
- Animation by: Ted Bonnicksen; Bob Carlson; Walt Clinton; John Elliotte; Jack Gayek; Art Fitzpatrick
- Color process: Technicolor
- Production company: Walt Disney Productions
- Distributed by: RKO Radio Pictures
- Release date: May 9, 1941
- Running time: 7:37
- Country: United States
- Language: English

A Good Time for a Dime is a 1941 Disney short film in which Donald Duck watches a risqué Daisy perform the "Dance of the Seven Veils" in a Mutoscope at a penny arcade nickelodeon peep show. Donald also struggles with a crane drop machine and a miniature airplane ride.

== Plot ==
Inside a penny arcade, Donald sees several Mutoscopes, each charging a penny. Most are family friendly, such as "A Day for a Busy Bee" or "Scenic View of Niagara Falls", which Donald dismisses, until a more risque-sounding "Dance of the Seven Veils" catches his eye. The pictures show dances of a Daisy Duck looking dancer dropping veils in succession until Donald's viewing is rudely interrupted by a black out, which lights back up only to see the ultimate "The End" slide. Next Donald tries out a crane machine to win a camera, but he finishes empty handed when he sneezes all the prizes back in the crane machine. Finally, Donald pays a nickel to use a coin-operated airplane ride, but his ride is very short. Donald angrily grabs the throttle and uses it to start up the propeller blades to get himself a free ride. However, as he had removed the control stick, the plane goes out of control. Donald gets thrown out of the ride and stays afloat by flapping his arms, briefly behaving like a real world duck in flight. Donald risks getting caught in the propeller, but the ride bucks and Donald is reinserted into the cockpit. The ride then returns safely to the ground, although this has made Donald quite airsick. With that, Donald leaves the arcade, stumbling and groaning to himself.

== Voice cast ==
- Clarence Nash as Donald Duck

== Reception ==
Concerning the "somewhat orientalized Daisy", the Encyclopedia of Walt Disney's Animated Characters says that her appearance is "a brief and anonymous one; it is also her sexiest." However, it has been criticized as "unproblematically [representing] all of the Western stereotypes about the harem. A Good Time for a Dime manufactures the harem as a setting separate from any social phenomena and full of obliging women happily catering to male sexual fantasies."

The Film Daily called the short a "dandy cartoon", saying that "Donald Duck is back with a plenitude of hearty laughs for audiences in this short."

Motion Picture Herald said that A Good Time for a Dime is "an excellent Donald Duck color cartoon that pleased everyone", and "one of Disney's funniest".

== Home media ==
The short was released on May 18, 2004, on Walt Disney Treasures: The Chronological Donald, Volume One: 1934-1941.
