= The Rookie Bear =

- Directed by: Rudolf Ising
- Produced by: Rudolf Ising
- Starring: Gayne Whitman; Rudolf Ising
- Color process: Technicolor
- Production company: MGM Cartoons
- Distributed by: Metro-Goldwyn-Mayer
- Release date: May 17, 1941 (USA)
- Running time: 7:59
- Language: English

The Rookie Bear is a 1941 MGM cartoon featuring Barney Bear. It is the fourth cartoon in the Barney Bear series.

== Plot ==
Barney Bear is selected by a drawn Draft Number to enlist in the United States Army. His hibernation is interrupted when a telegram is delivered to him. He misinterprets the words on the telegram, and assumes that it is an actual vacation. Barney enters the base with vacation supplies, but discovers his true purpose when bumping into the heavy artillery. He is refused departure.

He enlists through answering "simple" questions, having his photo taken, his physicality examined, his flat feet inflated, his teeth fixed and in the end, when he has passed all his exams, has his butt stamped. He finally gets his uniform, gun and gas mask "which is thoroughly tested".

After putting on a pair of heavy shoes, Barney goes marching for 10,000 mi (16,000 km), but is tired (as well as his shoes, literally) after just 10 mi (16 km). His shoes get hotter and hotter until they sprout out popcorn.

The whole thing turns out to be a dream when a spit from Barney's fireplace wakes him up by burning his rear. Before Barney can go back to sleep, he receives a telegram telling him to enlist in the army, along with a P.S., saying "And this time, buddy, it ain't no dream!", much to Barney's dismay.

== Reception ==
The Rookie Bear was nominated for an Academy Award for Best Animated Short Film, but lost to Disney's Lend a Paw.

== See also ==
- The Bear That Couldn't Sleep
- Bah Wilderness
- Goggle Fishing Bear
- Wee-Willie Wildcat
- Bird-Brain Bird Dog
