= Little 'Tinker =

- Reissue title card of the cartoon.
- Directed by: Tex Avery
- Story by: Heck Allen
- Produced by: Fred Quimby
- Starring: Walter Craig; Bill Roberts; Dick Nelson; Sara Berner; Lillian Randolph; William Hanna (all uncredited)
- Music by: Scott Bradley
- Animation by: William Shull; Grant Simmons; Walter Clinton; Robert Bentley
- Layouts by: Louie Schmitt (uncredited)
- Backgrounds by: John Didrik Johnsen (uncredited)
- Color process: Technicolor
- Production company: Metro-Goldwyn-Mayer cartoon studio
- Distributed by: Metro-Goldwyn-Mayer
- Release date: May 15, 1948
- Running time: 7 minutes
- Language: English

Little 'Tinker is a 1948 MGM cartoon directed by Tex Avery. It was produced by Fred Quimby with the soundtrack composed by Scott Bradley.

The short revolves around a little skunk on a pursuit for a mate.

== Plot ==
The story begins at the home of B.O. Skunk, which contains many fans. B.O. takes a shower with O-Bouy soap (a parody of Lifebuoy soap, complete with its jingle) and overly douses himself with expiring perfume.

Then he goes out for a walk. The flowers along the path from his home wither and fall as he passes them. As B.O. walks to the forest, he sees a pretty squirrel who calls him closer. But as B.O. goes to the squirrel with wilted flowers and she smells his stench, she runs out to her home and puts up a sign that reads "NO VACANCY". The point is that B.O. has an offensive odor from which everyone runs. B.O. then sees a pretty female rabbit. He first gives her a flower to smell, and then substitutes himself. The female rabbit screams in horror and runs into her hole and "zips" it. B.O. cries, not knowing what to do.

Then, Cupid appears and gives the skunk a book: Advice to the Love-Lorn by Beatrice Bare Fax (a reference to famed newspaper advice columnist Beatrice Fairfax). The first chapter says to try the great lover routine. B.O. then goes to another female squirrel sitting on a branch and attracts her by speaking in the manner of Charles Boyer. All goes well until the squirrel smells B.O. and runs away. B.O., thinking he is kissing the squirrel, kisses the branches of the tree and then a sleepy owl. The owl falls onto the ground, unconscious.

The second chapter says to try the balcony routine. B.O. dresses like Romeo and climbs a tree to serenade a female raccoon with a part of the sextet, "Chi mi frena in tal momento" from Act II of Gaetano Donizetti's Lucia di Lammermoor. At first, the raccoon is attracted to B.O.'s wooing, but when she smells him, she throws a pot at him, sending B.O. falling into a nearby pond. Even the fish are repelled by B.O.'s smell and then they run away from the pond.

Then, a big female rabbit goes to B.O., grabs him and wants to kiss him. But even she runs from his smell and tosses B.O. into a trash can and hides herself in a rabbit hole, which moves as she flees.

The next chapter of book says "Swoon 'em!" B.O. then gets a Frank Sinatra suit and pours water on it to shrink it to fit him. Then, B.O.-Sinatra sings "Rhapsody in Pew" (really "All or Nothing at All", sung and impersonated by Bill Roberts). All the females in the forest run to hear B.O.'s singing. All of them swoon, and even an old female rabbit jumps in the air and yells "FRANKIE!" B.O. continues to sing with more gags and then ends as all the females jump on him. But then they all run out, having detected his smell.

Despairing, B.O. then attempts suicide by drinking a bottle of poison because no one loves him. But Cupid stops him and shows the last piece of advice: camouflage! B.O. then sees a pretty fox and disguises himself as a male fox. B.O. whistles to the fox. The fox likes B.O. and she kisses him. B.O. is excited and then walks with the fox on a trunk lying horizontally above the river. B.O. and the fox then lose their balance and fall into the river. Downcast, B.O. thinks that now the fox will run away from him, as the paint has washed out. But the "fox" is really a painted skunk too, as is revealed when paint washes out of her fur.

Now aware that they are both skunks, they kiss longingly. Iris out, and B.O. throws the advice book out of the scene.

== Voice cast ==
- Dick Nelson as Cupid
- Walter Craig as B.O. Skunk (Charles Boyer scene)
  - William "Bill" Roberts as the singing voice of B.O. Skunk, (performing both Lucia di Lammermoor in operatic style, and All or Nothing at All impersonating Frank Sinatra).
- Sara Berner as The Screaming Rabbit / The Tall Rabbit / The Swooning Rabbits / The Old Rabbit
  - William Hanna as The Old Rabbit screaming (re-used audio from The Million Dollar Cat).
- Lillian Randolph as The Black Rabbit

== Reception ==
Animation historian Jerry Beck claimed Little 'Tinker to be his favorite Tex Avery cartoon, stating: "It's as strong as any other MGM Avery for laughs, but this one has one other thing – 'heart' – something unusual for Avery during this period. We care about this little guy – and there is a happy ending that makes all his travails worth the effort... If I had to show one Avery to someone who has never seen his cartoons, this is the one I'd pick. Makes me laugh, and care, every time."

Animation historian John Canemaker describes Little 'Tinker as: "...a softer, more sentimental Avery peaks through the unusual hard-edged gag feasts. Though he dismissed them as “cutey-cutey”, films like Little 'Tinker, One Cab's Family... Little Johnny Jet... and Dixieland Droopy... have, underneath the non-stop gags, a surprisingly sincere affection for the characters and an empathy for their predicaments..." Canemaker also notes: "The erotic effect of his [B.O. Skunk's] laid-back performance on a bevy of lady bunnies is an unleading female sexual heart to rival Avery's Wolf..."

== Home Media ==
- VHS (1987): MGM Cartoon Magic Vol. 4 - Little Cesario
- VHS (1988): Tex Avery's Screwball Classics
- Laserdisc (1990): Tex Avery's Screwball Classics
- Laserdisc (1993): The Compleat Tex Avery, Side 4
- DVD (2003 France): La Collection Tex Avery (The Tex Avery Collection), Disc 2 (unrestored)
- DVD (2004): The Bachelor and the Bobby Soxer (extra, unrestored)
- Blu-Ray/DVD (2021): Tex Avery Screwball Classics: Vol. 3 (restored)

== See also ==
- Pepé Le Pew - a character with an identical premise from competitor Warner Bros.

== Notes ==
- The black rabbit in the Frank Sinatra scene (who says, "Love dat man") has been edited out of some copies for stereotypical reasons.

During production the short was originally titled Smellbound (a play on Alfred Hitchcock's 1945 film Spellbound) - but it was later changed to Little 'Tinker.
