= Ray Patterson (animator) =

American animator (1911–2001)

- Born: Raymond Patterson; November 23, 1911; Hollywood, California, U.S.
- Died: December 30, 2001 (aged 90); Encino, California, U.S.
- Occupations: Animator, director, producer, storyboard artist, writer
- Employers: Screen Gems (1929–1940, 1941–1943); Walt Disney Productions (1940–1941); MGM (1943–1955); Walter Lantz Productions (1954); Grantray-Lawrence Animation (1954–1968); Hanna-Barbera (1967–1993)
- Spouse: June Walker Patterson
- Children: four daughters

Raymond Patterson (November 23, 1911 – December 30, 2001) was an American animator, producer, and director. He was born in Hollywood, California, and was the younger brother of animator Don Patterson.

== Career ==
Patterson's earliest works in animation were for Charles Mintz's Krazy Kat/Screen Gems studio, where he started as an inker in 1929. He remained at Mintz for eleven years. In 1940, he moved to Walt Disney Productions, where he animated on Fantasia and Dumbo, as well as several Pluto shorts (Bone Trouble and Pluto's Playmate). By 1942, he mostly worked on Donald Duck shorts such as Donald Gets Drafted.

Patterson left Disney in 1941 during an animation strike. He would briefly reunite with Screen Gems, now creatively supervised by Frank Tashlin, before moving to the Metro-Goldwyn-Mayer cartoon department in 1943, with his first short for them being War Dogs, followed by Baby Puss, his debut on the Tom and Jerry series. While he mostly worked in the studio's Hanna-Barbera unit, he occasionally provided animation for Tex Avery's unit in the 1950s (as well as Avery's substitute director Dick Lundy). He worked on several Academy Award-winning animation shorts: Mouse Trouble (1944), Quiet Please! (1945), The Little Orphan (1948), and Johann Mouse (1952). Patterson (along with his colleague Irven Spence) would briefly leave MGM in the mid 40's. During this period, he would help organize and educate animators from David Hand's Gaumount British Animation Studio. He and Spence would later move back to MGM in the late 40's.

Patterson left MGM permanently in 1953 and was briefly hired by Walter Lantz. He (alongside former Tex Avery animator Grant Simmons) would direct two shorts, Broadways Bow Wows and Dig that Dog. Months afterwards, Patterson and Simmons left Walter Lantz Productions and co-founded their own studio, Grantray-Lawrence Animation, which he operated until 1967. GrantRay-Lawrence's early work was providing animation for television commercials, including the original "Winston Tastes Good" campaign. The company later moved on to producing such animated television series as Spider-Man and The Marvel Superheroes.

After GrantRay-Lawrence folded in 1967, Patterson joined his former bosses at Hanna-Barbera, where he worked as a supervising director on several animated television series. Patterson was eventually promoted to vice president in charge of animation direction, a position he held until his retirement in 1993.

Patterson was awarded the 1999 Winsor McCay Award by the International Animated Film Society, ASIFA-Hollywood for his lifetime of contributions to the animation field.

== Personal life and death ==
Ray was married to June Walker Patterson. June worked at Disney as a cel painter. They had four daughters.

Patterson died of natural causes in Encino, California on December 30, 2001, a month after his 90th birthday.

== Filmography ==
=== Short films ===
Year	Series	Title	Credits
1943	Tom and Jerry	Baby Puss	animator
1944	Tom and Jerry	The Zoot Cat	animator
1944	Tom and Jerry	The Million Dollar Cat	animator
1944	Tom and Jerry	The Bodyguard	animator
1944	Tom and Jerry	Puttin' on the Dog	animator
1944	Tom and Jerry	Mouse Trouble	animator
1945	Tom and Jerry	The Mouse Comes to Dinner	animator
1945	Tom and Jerry	Mouse in Manhattan	animator
1945	Tom and Jerry	Tee for Two	animator
1945	Tom and Jerry	Flirty Birdy	animator
1945	Tom and Jerry	Quiet Please!	animator
1946	Tom and Jerry	Springtime for Thomas	animator
1946	Tom and Jerry	Solid Serenade	animator
1947	Tom and Jerry	Salt Water Tabby	animator
1948	Tom and Jerry	The Truce Hurts	animator
1948	Tom and Jerry	Old Rockin' Chair Tom	animator
1948	Tom and Jerry	Professor Tom	animator
1948	Tom and Jerry	Mouse Cleaning	animator
1949	Tom and Jerry	Polka Dot Puss	animator
1949	Tom and Jerry	The Little Orphan	animator
1949	Tom and Jerry	Hatch Up Your Troubles	animator
1949	Tom and Jerry	Heavenly Puss	animator
1949	Tom and Jerry	The Cat and the Mermouse	animator
1949	Tom and Jerry	Love That Pup	animator
1949	Tom and Jerry	Tennis Chumps	animator
1950	Tom and Jerry	Little Quacker	animator
1950	Tom and Jerry	Saturday Evening Puss	animator
1950	Tom and Jerry	Texas Tom	animator
1950	Tom and Jerry	Jerry and the Lion	animator
1950	Tom and Jerry	Safety Second	animator
1950	Tom and Jerry	Tom and Jerry in the Hollywood Bowl	animator
1950	Tom and Jerry	The Framed Cat	animator
1950	Tom and Jerry	Cueball Cat	animator
1951	Tom and Jerry	Casanova Cat	animator
1951	Tom and Jerry	Jerry and the Goldfish	animator
1951	Tom and Jerry	Jerry's Cousin	animator
1951	Tom and Jerry	Sleepy-Time Tom	animator
1951	Tom and Jerry	His Mouse Friday	animator
1951	Tom and Jerry	Slicked-Up Pup	animator
1951	Tom and Jerry	Nit-Witty Kitty	animator
1951	Tom and Jerry	Cat Napping	animator
1952	Tom and Jerry	The Flying Cat	animator
1952	Tom and Jerry	The Duck Doctor	animator
1952	Tom and Jerry	Triplet Trouble	animator
1952	Tom and Jerry	Little Runaway	animator
1952	Tom and Jerry	Fit to Be Tied	animator
1952	Droopy	Caballero Droopy	animator
1952	Tom and Jerry	Cruise Cat	animator
1952	Barney Bear	The Little Wise Quacker	animator
1952	Tom and Jerry	The Dog House	animator
1953	Tom and Jerry	The Missing Mouse	animator
1953	Barney Bear	Barney's Hungry Cousin	animator
1953	Tom and Jerry	Johann Mouse	animator
1953		Little Johnny Jet	animator
1953	Tom and Jerry	That's My Pup!	animator
1953		T.V. of Tomorrow	animator
1953	Barney Bear	Wee-Willie Wildcat	animator
1953	Tom and Jerry	Just Ducky	animator
1953	Tom and Jerry	Two Little Indians	animator
1953	Droopy	Three Little Pups	animator
1954	Tom and Jerry	Posse Cat	animator
1954	Droopy	Drag-A-Long Droopy	animator
1954	Tom and Jerry	Hic-cup Pup	animator
1954		Billy Boy	animator
1954	Tom and Jerry	Mice Follies	animator
1954	Tom and Jerry	Neapolitan Mouse	animator
1954	Tom and Jerry	Downhearted Duckling	animator
1955	Tom and Jerry	Pup on a Picnic	animator
1955	Tom and Jerry	Mouse for Sale	animator
1955		The First Bad Man	animator
1955	Droopy	Deputy Droopy	animator
1955	Tom and Jerry	Pecos Pest	animator
1956	Tom and Jerry	The Egg and Jerry	animator
1957	Tom and Jerry	Tops with Pops	animator
1957	Tom and Jerry	Feedin' the Kiddie	animator

=== Feature films ===
Year	Title	Credits	Notes
1940	Fantasia	Animator - Segment "Dance of the Hours"	
1941	Dumbo	Animator	
1946	Holiday in Mexico	Animator	
1962	Gay Purr-ee	Animator	
1964	Hey There, It's Yogi Bear!	Animator	
1973	Charlotte's Web	Animator	
1975	Coonskin	Animator	
1986	GoBots: Battle of the Rock Lords	Director	

=== Television ===
Year	Title	Credits	Notes
1979	The Flintstones Meet Rockula and Frankenstone	director	TV special
1979	Scooby Goes Hollywood	director	TV movie
1980	The Flintstones: Fred's Final Fling	director	TV special
1980	Yogi's First Christmas	director	TV movie
1981	The Flintstones: Jogging Fever	director	TV special
1982	Christmas Comes to Pac-Land	director	TV special
1987	Tis The Season to Be Smurfy	director	TV movie
1988	Scooby-Doo! and the Reluctant Werewolf	director	TV movie
1993	A Flintstone Family Christmas	director	TV movie
