= Wee-Willie Wildcat =

- Directed by: Dick Lundy
- Story by: Jack Cosgriff; Heck Allen
- Produced by: Fred Quimby
- Starring: Paul Frees; William Hanna (screaming - uncredited)
- Music by: Scott Bradley
- Animation by: Michael Lah; Walter Clinton; Grant Simmons; Ray Patterson; Robert Bentley
- Backgrounds by: John Didrik Johnsen
- Color process: Technicolor
- Production company: MGM cartoon studio
- Distributed by: Metro-Goldwyn-Mayer
- Release date: June 20, 1953
- Running time: 6 minutes
- Language: English

Wee-Willie Wildcat is a 1953 Barney Bear cartoon. It is the 22nd Barney Bear short. It was directed by Dick Lundy using the Tex Avery unit while Avery was gone from the studio.

== Plot ==
The cartoon begins at Barney's house, who lives next door to William Wildcat. Barney overhears William Wildcat scolding his son, Willie Wildcat. Barney walks next door just in time to find Willie running from his dad. William catches his son and sits down on a rock by a tree while turning Willie over his knee. He pulls down his pants and begins a blistering spanking on his bare bottom.

Without realizing that Willie was being punished for being disobedient, Barney takes him to his house and attempts to get along with him through child psychology. Willie starts his troubles by burning Barney's foot and putting it in gasoline. Barney tries playing "Pin the Tail on the Donkey" with Willie, but accidentally pins the tail on a real donkey and ends up getting kicked into a sign by the donkey. Barney then tries playing football with Willie, but Willie puts a rock inside the football and Barney hurts his foot after trying to kick it. Barney then decides to "go along with the gag" by pretending to be a damsel in distress on a toy train track, but Willie uses a real train to run over Barney.

Barney decides to "develop Willie's love of true nature" by gardening, but Willie pours Quick-Grow Plant Food on the two trees that Barney's hammock is tied to and they grow very tall and Barney lands in a barrel of tar which Willie wheelbarrows him down to a clothes washing machine. Barney then tries to "give him a hobby" through photography but Willie slips a giant bullet into the camera and turns it around, making Barney fire himself. Barney then tries "winning his undying attention" by baking him a cake but Willie puts a gashose into the cake, which turns into a bomb cake that explodes when Barney lights the candle.

Barney then reads the final rule of the child psychology book he was reading throughout the cartoon, which reads "If all else fails, Bottom's Up!" So Barney puts Willie over his knee and he and William both spank Willie's bottom. This time making the mistake of not baring his bottom, only to have sore hands because of Willie hiding the book in his pants.

== See also ==
- The Bear That Couldn't Sleep
- The Rookie Bear
- Bah Wilderness
- Goggle Fishing Bear
- Bird-Brain Bird Dog
- The Fishing Bear
