= Don Williams (animator) =

American illustrator

Don "Ducky" Williams
- Born: 1946 or 1947 (age 79–80); Springfield, Massachusetts, U.S.
- Occupations: Character Artist; Illustrator
- Known for: Ability to draw almost every Disney character as well as other famous characters

Don Williams, also known by the nickname Ducky, is an American illustrator employed by The Walt Disney Company. Williams has worked at Disney for more than thirty years, at a number of different positions, finally ending up in the marketing division as an animator.

Williams is not to be confused with the American animator Don Harold Williams, who worked at various animation studios (including Disney) during the golden age of animation.

== Early life ==
Don Williams was born in Springfield, Massachusetts. He is of Scottish descent and still has strong ties to Scotland. He grew up poor during the 1950s. His mother was a single mother raising eight children including Don. His mother nicknamed Don "Ducky", because she loved the Donald Duck comic books.

Williams always knew he wanted to be an artist. When he was just 10 years old he wrote his first letter to Walt Disney asking for a job. Walt Disney wrote him back saying that he was sorry but he did not have any jobs for a 10-year-old cartoonist; however, he encouraged him to keep drawing. He graduated high school in the early 1960s and was immediately drafted into the Vietnam War. He joined the Navy, and served for four years in the Navy.

After he left the navy he went back to Massachusetts, where he got a job as a teller at a local bank; after a few months of work he was promoted to branch manager. He managed the bank for 10 years.

== Life before Disney ==
While working at the bank, Williams continued to draw. During the Christmas season at the bank he would hang up his drawings around the bank. The drawings caught the eye of one of the patrons of the bank, who happened to be an anchor for the local 6pm news. The anchor then did a piece on Williams and his drawings. A friend of Williams's, unbeknownst to him, wrote a letter and sent a copy of the tape to Disney animation studios in California. Two weeks after the tape was sent, he received a letter from the animation department of Disney saying that while they liked his drawings there were no job openings available at that time. However, he was told that if he wanted to pursue a career as a Disney artist he should contact Ralph Kent, the director of the Marketing Art department for Walt Disney World in Florida. He then sent his tape and a new letter to Kent.

Williams waited quite some time for a response but never received one. Williams took matters in his own hands and called Kent. He spoke to Kent's Secretary who said that Kent had not had time to watch his tape, and that if he really wanted feedback then he should come down to Florida himself. He then went to Florida where he met with two artists and Kent, who told him that his work was unpolished because he did not go to an art school. They told him that he had talent, and he just needed work. They sent him off with official Disney model sheets of characters and gave him contact information of veteran character artist who worked with Disney World named Russell Schroeder.

He went back to work at the bank and began drawing 100 pictures a week and sending them off to Schroeder for critique. He drew 100 pictures a week for two years before he finally decided that he could no longer pursue his dream in Massachusetts, so he moved to Florida. He attempted to get a job at Disney World for three months, with no luck. He instead got a job right outside the park at a restaurant. After two weeks at the restaurant he was desperate to get any job inside the park. He was finally offered a job at the park as a custodian during the graveyard shift, but after a little digging he found out there was a job painting patrons portraits. Even while working at Disney, he still sent in his 100 pictures a week to Schroeder. After six weeks as a portrait artist the division was shut down, and he was sent to work as a clerk in Tomorrowland. After five weeks in Tomorrowland, he found out about a temporary opening in the art department.

He landed the job thanks to Schroeder and the massive amount of drawings he had sent him over the years. It was a 30-day trial period. After 30 days of work, no one said anything to Williams so he just kept showing up for work, and he has been working there ever since.

== Life at Disney ==
Williams started at the Marketing Art department, later called Disney Parks and Resorts Advertising Creative, then Disney's Yellow Shoes Global Creative Group There were originally staffed 16 illustrator, but the number dwindled down to just him, with his co-workers going off to work in more computer-based media.

Williams stayed behind, saying: "I am not an animator, I am an illustrator." He can use computers, he just prefers paint. He became the sole and last Senior Character Artist for the Walt Disney Marketing. He continues to create illustrations for mailers, brochures, guide books, and specialty items. He also illustrates almost anything that has to do with advertising of the Disney company in the Orlando area.

Williams has also created art inside the Disney Parks, providing paintings, signage and china for the Lady and the Tramp themed restaurant, Tony's Town Square Cafe. He also helped put together the original Mickey Mouse house that was located in Mickey's Birthday Land. Today he gives presentations across America and on Disney Cruise line ships. He is a popular speaker and celebrity, often one of the most respected artists at the Epcot International Festival of the Arts. He has also painted hundreds of limited-edition lithographs for Disney Cruise Line, Disney Vacation Club and other Walt Disney Company divisions.

== Works as illustrator ==
When Williams first started working at Disney he became a colleague of Russell Schroeder, who subsequently recommended him his first illustrating job. Williams painted and Schroeder drew the pictures for Mickey's Prince and the Pauper. Since then he has done around 200 different Disney children's book illustrations. The books he has illustrated include:

- Disney's Pocahontas, Golden Books, 2013
- Walt Disney's 101 Dalmatians, Golden Books, 1994
- Disney's Hercules, Golden Books, 1997
- Disney's The Lion King, Golden Pr, 1994
- Belle Explores the Castle, Disney Pr. 1992
- Always Friends (Super Coloring Book), Golden Disney, 2004
- Rudolph's Bright Christmas, Golden Books, 2003
- Funny Hunny Christmas, RH Disney, 2003
- Deck the Halls, Golden Books, 2003
- Raining Cats and Dogs, Random House Books for Young Readers, 2003
- Good Night, Sweet Princess, RH Disney, 2002
- Don't Forget to Remember, Random House for Young Readers, 2002
- Disney Princess: Royal Rooms and Pretty Places, RH Disney, 2002
- Peter Pan, RH Disney, 2002
- A Whale of Time, RH Disney, 2002
- Lost and Found, Random House for Young Readers, 2001
- Taking Care of Quetzal, Random House for Young Readers, 2001
- Simba's Daring Rescue, RH Disney, 2001
- Simba's Jungle Hunt, RH Disney, 2001
- Cassie's Runaway Kite, Random House for Young Readers, 2001
- Weezie Loses her Voice, Random House for Young Readers, 2001
- Dragon Tales Cassie Loves a Parade, Tandem Library, 2000
- Santa's Little Helper Paint Box with Paint Brush and Paint Pots, Tandem Library, 1999
- La Cenicienta, Grupo Editorial Norma, 1999
- Bounce Around, Tigger, Golden Books Publishing Company, 1999
- Picture Me Dancing with Minnie, Picture Me Books, 1998
- Picture me on Vacation with Mickey, Picture Me Books, 1998
- Ariel's Light-Up Cake, Mouse Works, 1998
- Snow Whites Apple Pie: A Little Look Book, Golden Books Publishing Company, 1997
- Disney's Pocahontas: The Voice of the Wind, Golden Books, 1995
- Walt Disney's 101 Dalmatians: Pongo to the Rescue, Golden PR, 1994
- Disney's Aladdin: Monkey Business, Golden PR, 1993
- Walt Disney's Cinderella, Golden Pr, 1993
- Belle Explores the Castle, Disney Pr, 1992
- Walt Disney Pictures Presents: The Prince and the Pauper, Golden Pr, 1990
