= Goggle Fishing Bear =

- Poster
- Directed by: Supervised by: Michael Lah; Preston Blair
- Story by: Jack Cosgriff
- Produced by: Fred Quimby
- Music by: Scott Bradley
- Animation by: Ray Abrams; Gil Turner; Don Patterson
- Color process: Technicolor
- Production company: MGM Cartoons
- Distributed by: Metro-Goldwyn-Mayer
- Release date: January 15, 1949 (USA)
- Running time: 7:19
- Language: English

Goggle Fishing Bear is a 1949 cartoon from MGM, featuring the character Barney Bear who attempts to go goggle fishing, with the aid of a sea lion. It is the 16th Barney Bear cartoon and the last Barney Bear cartoon to be supervised by Michael Lah and Preston Blair.

== Plot ==
The cartoon starts with Barney driving a motor boat at sea, where he attempts to fish. After he drops the anchor, a sea lion assumes that they are playing catch and brings the anchor back. Barney tricks the sea lion into swimming the other way, by pretending to throw the anchor in one direction, then throwing it in another — but his foot is tied to the rope. Barney falls in and the sea lion saves him.

A fish is stuck in Barney's suit, in which the sea lion, in an attempt to catch the fish with a trident, pokes Barney's backside. The fish gets out of Barney's suit, lands back in the water and the sea lion aides Barney in catching it. After chasing it into a cave, the sea lion tries to warn Barney of an oncoming shark, but Barney dismisses his warning, instead he shoos it away. The sea lion came back, trying to warn him again, but eventually flees after seeing the shark is coming and leaving the unnoticed bear alone.

The shark swims up behind Barney, bumping his bottom to face him. Barney, now thinking that is more of the sea lion's goading; he turns around and pokes it with his trident violently. Barney then stops, realizing that was not a sea lion, but the enraged shark that the sea lion was warning him about before. Barney tries evading the shark by pretending to be an underwater king, which fails.

Barney tries hiding under a rock, which is soon revealed to be an octopus that swims away in fear, and the shark tries eating Barney. The sea lion tries to stop it by keeping the jaws open, to which the shark's teeth nibbles Barney in the rear. Barney and the sea lion get back to the boat with the shark in pursuit. The shark uses its fin to saw the boat in half and Barney tries reconnecting it. Using its tail as a propeller, the shark strikes the boat. But before the shark finally eats Barney, the anchor suddenly lands on its head and Barney and the sea lion use the shark to ride back to land as the cartoon irises out.

== See also ==
- The Bear That Couldn't Sleep
- The Rookie Bear
- Bah Wilderness
- Wee-Willie Wildcat
- Bird-Brain Bird Dog
