= USS Cowslip =

Gunboat of the United States Navy

History

United States
- Ordered: as Meteor
- Laid down: date unknown
- Launched: 1863
- Acquired: 21 December 1863
- Commissioned: 27 January 1864
- Decommissioned: 1866 (est.)
- Stricken: 1866 (est.)
- Fate: Sold, 28 August 1866

General characteristics
- Displacement: 220 tons
- Length: 123 ft (37 m)
- Beam: 24 ft (7.3 m)
- Draught: 7 ft (2.1 m)
- Propulsion: steam engine; side wheel-propelled
- Speed: not known
- Complement: 36
- Armament: one 20-pounder rifled gun; two 24-pounder smoothbores

USS Cowslip was a steamer acquired by the Union Navy during the American Civil War.

She was used as a gunboat by the Union Navy to patrol navigable waterways of the Confederacy to prevent the South from trading with other countries. She was also used in other operational roles, such as an ammunition ship, a dispatch boat, and a rescue and salvage vessel.

== Built in New York in 1863 ==
Cowslip, a side wheel steamer, was built in 1863 at Newburgh, New York, as Meteor; purchased 21 December 1863 from James How and C. W. Copeland; outfitted at New York Navy Yard; and commissioned 27 January 1864, Acting Ensign R. Canfield in command.

== Civil War operations ==
=== Assigned to the West Gulf Blockade ===
Assigned to the West Gulf Blockading Squadron, Cowslip departed New York City 2 February 1864 and arrived at New Orleans, Louisiana, 26 February. Constantly active, she carried officers and men and delivered mail, stores, guns, and ammunition for her squadron and provisions for refugees. She was used as a tow and convoy steamer, performed rescue and salvage work, and served as a picket and patrol vessel.

=== Combat action during blockade duty ===
Her actions against the Confederates included the capture of a sailboat with five men on board off Pascagoula, Mississippi, 15 April 1864; the sloop Last Push, 29 May; and a raid up Biloxi Bay, Mississippi, on which she captured five sloops and a small steamer, and destroyed six large boats, three flat boats, and four salt works.

During July and August 1864 she operated off Mobile, Alabama, participating in the preparations for the Battle of Mobile Bay 5 August and in Admiral David G. Farragut's brilliant action on that day which culminated in victory for the Union Navy.

=== Cowslip active in at-sea rescue work ===
Cowslip was also active in rescue work. She saved the crew of USS Narcissus 8 December 1864 after their ship had been blown up by a torpedo (mine) at Edgemont Key, Florida, and salvaged USS Narcissus’ guns and ammunition. Cowslip rescued six wounded survivors from USS Sciota, after Sciota was torpedoed 14 April 1865.

=== Rescuing three ships when Marshall’s warehouse exploded ===
Cowslip rendered efficient and valuable assistance by towing three ships out of the danger zone when Marshall's warehouse in Mobile, Alabama, was wrecked by an explosion 25 May 1865.

== Post-war decommissioning and sale ==
Her service complete, Cowslip was sold 28 August 1866 at Pensacola, Florida.
