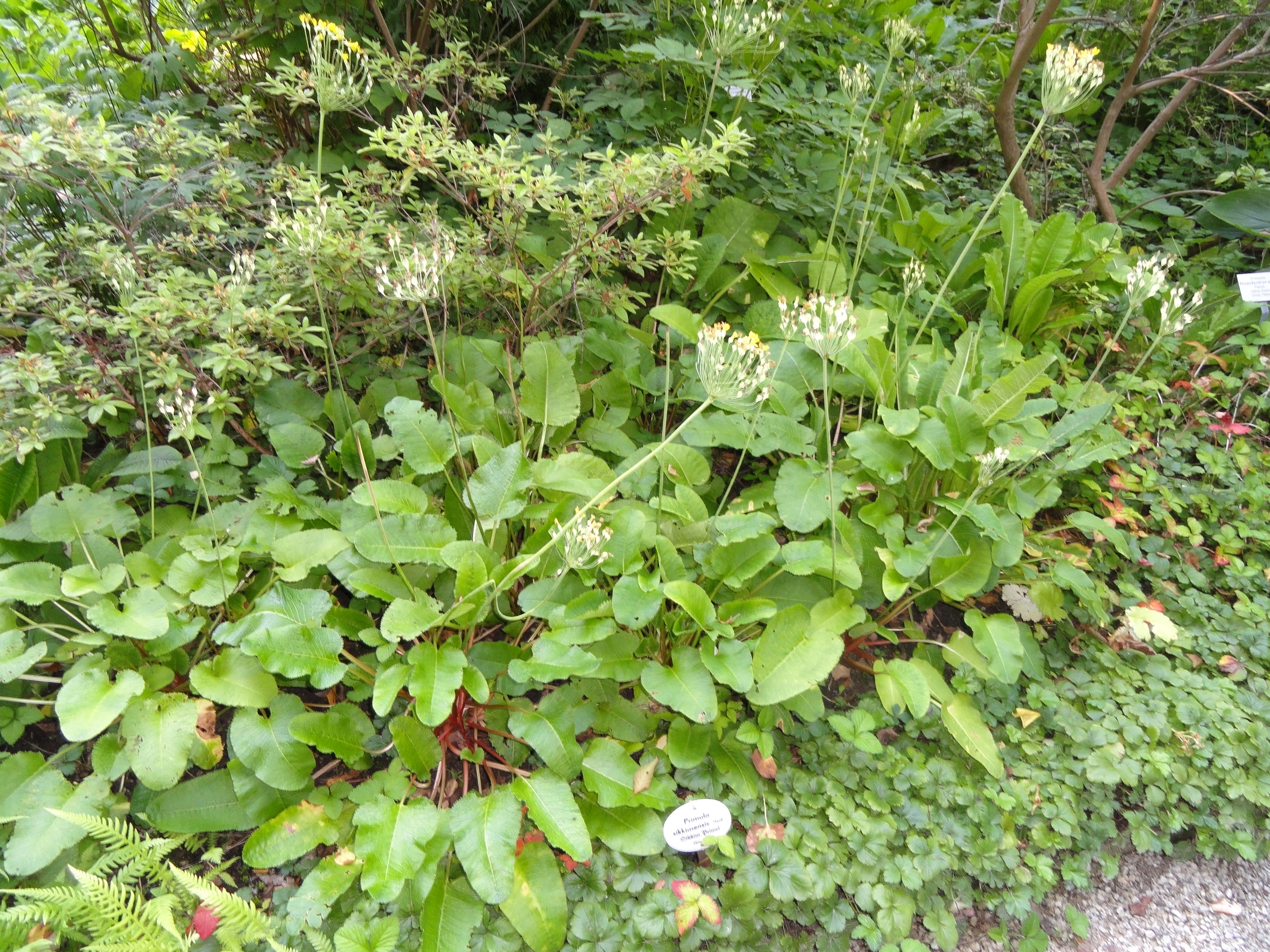

Scientific classification
- Kingdom: Plantae
- Clade: Tracheophytes
- Clade: Angiosperms
- Clade: Eudicots
- Clade: Asterids
- Order: Ericales
- Family: Primulaceae
- Genus: Primula
- Species: P. sikkimensis

Binomial name
- Primula sikkimensis Hook.

= Primula sikkimensis =

Species of flowering plant

Primula sikkimensis (Himalayan cowslip, Sikkim cowslip, Chinese: 鍾花報春; pinyin: zhōng huā bàochūn) is a species of flowering plant in the family Primulaceae, native to the Himalayan region at altitudes of 3,200–4,400 m (10,499–14,436 ft), from western Nepal to south west China. It is an herbaceous perennial growing to 90 cm (35 in) tall by 60 cm (24 in) broad, with umbels of fragrant yellow flowers, appearing in summer on slender stems which arise from basal rosettes of leaves. The flowers may be covered by a mealy-white layer (farina).

This plant is suitable for cultivation in partial shade, in soil that remains moist at all times. It has gained the Royal Horticultural Society's Award of Garden Merit.
