= Barney Bear =

Animated film series

- The opening sequence
- Directed by: Rudolf Ising; George Gordon; Preston Blair; Michael Lah; Dick Lundy
- Story by: Heck Allen; Jack Cosgriff
- Produced by: Rudolf Ising (1939–1943) Fred Quimby (1939–1954)
- Starring: Rudolf Ising; Pinto Colvig William Hanna Frank Bingman; Paul Frees; Billy Bletcher; Daws Butler; Harlow Wilcox; Jeanne Dunn
- Music by: Scott Bradley
- Production company: Metro-Goldwyn-Mayer
- Distributed by: Loew's, Inc.
- Running time: 6–9 minutes (per short)
- Country: United States
- Language: English

Barney Bear is an American series of animated cartoon short subjects produced and distributed by Metro-Goldwyn-Mayer. The title character is an anthropomorphic cartoon character, a sluggish, sleepy bear who often is in pursuit of nothing except for peace and quiet. 26 cartoons were produced between 1939 and 1954. The series is currently owned by Turner Entertainment Co.

== History ==
The character was created for Metro-Goldwyn-Mayer by director Rudolf Ising, who based the bear's grumpy yet pleasant disposition on his own and derived many of his mannerisms from the screen actor Wallace Beery. The character was voiced by Rudolf Ising from 1939 to 1943, Pinto Colvig in 1941, Billy Bletcher from 1944 to 1949, Paul Frees from 1952 until 1954, Frank Welker in 1980, Lou Scheimer in 1980, Jeff Bergman in 2004, and Richard McGonagle from 2012 to 2013. Barney Bear, then unnamed and addressed as simply Mr. Bear, made his first appearance in The Bear That Couldn't Sleep in 1939, and, by 1941, was the star of his own series, getting an Oscar nomination for his fourth cartoon, the 1941 short The Rookie Bear. Ising left the studio in 1943. Three additional cartoons were produced and directed by George Gordon before he too left in 1945.

Ising's original Barney design contained a plethora of detail: shaggy fur, wrinkled clothing, and six eyebrows; as the series progressed, the design was gradually simplified and streamlined, reaching its peak in three late 1940s shorts, the only output of the short-lived directorial team of Michael Lah and Preston Blair. Lah and Blair's cartoons had a direction much more closer to cartoons by Hanna-Barbera (not that surprising as the first of the three cartoons was supervised by William Hanna and Joseph Barbera) and Tex Avery. Both worked as animators (and Lah ultimately as co-director) on several of Avery's pictures. The last original Barney Bear cartoons were released between 1952 and 1954, directed by Ex-Disney/Lantz animator Dick Lundy. Lundy used Avery's unit to produce these cartoons while the latter was taking a one-year sabbatical from the studio. In the films from the late 1940s and early 1950s, Barney's design was streamlined and simplified, much the same as those of Tom and Jerry.

In the 1941 cartoon The Prospecting Bear, Barney is paired with a donkey named Benny Burro. Though Benny would only make two further cartoon appearances, he would later feature as Barney's partner in numerous comic book stories. In the 1944 Avery cartoon Screwball Squirrel, Barney Bear is mentioned by Sammy Squirrel as he talks to Screwy Squirrel at the beginning.

Barney Bear would not appear in new material again until Filmation's The Tom and Jerry Comedy Show in 1980. More recently, Barney Bear appeared in the direct-to-video films Tom and Jerry: Robin Hood and His Merry Mouse in 2012 and Tom and Jerry's Giant Adventure in 2013. Giant Adventure once again paired Barney with Benny Burro. Barney Bear also made cameo appearances in Tom and Jerry Meet Sherlock Holmes in 2010 and Tom and Jerry: Back to Oz in 2016.

== Plot ==
The series begins with the title character, Barney Bear, usually trying to accomplish a task in his series. He can be a bit lazy, but not too lazy. But he tends to overdo or do his task the wrong way. He also has a hard time going to sleep, but when he finally does go to sleep, he is a heavy sleeper. Mostly, he doesn't talk, but sometimes, he does.

At times, he was paired with Benny Burro, a curious donkey who accompanies him on several occasions, but mostly when he's in the west (Benny never spoke, but he did in the comic books).

== MGM filmography ==
#	Title	Directed by	Produced by	Release date	Notes
1	The Bear That Couldn't Sleep	Rudolf Ising	Rudolf Ising; Fred Quimby	June 10, 1939	The first Barney Bear cartoon.
2	The Fishing Bear	Rudolf Ising	Rudolf Ising; Fred Quimby	January 20, 1940	
3	The Prospecting Bear	Rudolf Ising	Rudolf Ising; Fred Quimby	March 8, 1941	
4	The Rookie Bear	Rudolf Ising	Rudolf Ising; Fred Quimby	May 17, 1941	Oscar nominee
5	The Flying Bear	Rudolf Ising Robert Allen	Rudolf Ising; Fred Quimby	November 1, 1941	
6	The Bear and the Beavers	Rudolf Ising	Rudolf Ising; Fred Quimby	March 28, 1942	
7	Wild Honey (Or How to Get Along Without a Ration Book!)	Rudolf Ising	Rudolf Ising; Fred Quimby	November 7, 1942	
8	Barney Bear's Victory Garden	Rudolf Ising	Rudolf Ising; Fred Quimby	December 26, 1942	First cartoon to name the titular character as Barney Bear.
9	Bah Wilderness	Rudolf Ising	Rudolf Ising; Fred Quimby	February 13, 1943	
10	Barney Bear and the Uninvited Pest	Rudolf Ising	Rudolf Ising; Fred Quimby	July 17, 1943	
11	Bear Raid Warden	George Gordon	Fred Quimby	September 9, 1944	
12	Barney Bear's Polar Pest	George Gordon	Fred Quimby	December 30, 1944	
13	The Unwelcome Guest	Michael Lah	Fred Quimby	February 17, 1945	Lah claimed to have also directed this cartoon. George Gordon left before production started.
14	The Bear and the Bean	Preston Blair; Michael Lah	Fred Quimby	January 30, 1948	Also supervised by William Hanna and Joseph Barbera
15	The Bear and the Hare	Preston Blair; Michael Lah	Fred Quimby	June 26, 1948	
16	Goggle Fishing Bear	Preston Blair; Michael Lah	Fred Quimby	January 15, 1949	
17	The Little Wise Quacker	Dick Lundy	Fred Quimby	November 8, 1952	
18	Busybody Bear	Dick Lundy	Fred Quimby	December 20, 1952	
19	Barney's Hungry Cousin	Dick Lundy	Fred Quimby	January 31, 1953	
20	Cobs and Robbers	Dick Lundy	Fred Quimby	March 14, 1953	
21	Heir Bear	Dick Lundy	Fred Quimby	May 30, 1953	
22	Wee-Willie Wildcat	Dick Lundy	Fred Quimby	June 20, 1953	
23	Half-Pint Palomino	Dick Lundy	Fred Quimby	September 26, 1953	
24	The Impossible Possum	Dick Lundy	Fred Quimby	March 20, 1954	
25	Sleepy-Time Squirrel	Dick Lundy	Fred Quimby	June 19, 1954	
26	Bird-Brain Bird Dog	Dick Lundy	Fred Quimby	July 31, 1954	Last Barney Bear cartoon.

== Home media ==
A selection of Barney Bear cartoons have been released on VHS tapes and Happy Harmonies Cartoon Classics LaserDisc by MGM/UA Home Video in the 1980s and 1990s.

The following cartoons can be found as extras on DVDs or Blu-rays of classic films of the period released by Warner Home Video:

- The Fishing Bear is on the DVD and the Blu-ray of Pride and Prejudice
- The Rookie Bear is on the DVD of Lady Be Good
- Bah Wilderness is on the DVD and Blu-ray of Du Barry Was a Lady
- Bear Raid Warden is on the DVD of Thirty Seconds Over Tokyo
- The Unwelcome Guest is on the DVD of Easy to Wed
- The Bear and the Hare is on the DVD of On an Island with You (albeit with fake stereo sound)
- Barney's Hungry Cousin is on the Blu-ray of Kiss Me Kate
- Cobs and Robbers is on the DVD of Easy to Love (albeit with fake stereo sound)
- The Impossible Possum is on the Blu-Ray of Lili

In 2017, most of the Barney Bear shorts were released on the Boomerang streaming app.

== Comic books ==
Barney Bear began appearing in comic books in 1942. Dell Comics licensed various MGM characters, including Barney Bear. He appeared in backup stories in Our Gang Comics (1942–49) starting in the first issue; then—from 1949—in Tom and Jerry Comics (later just Tom and Jerry) and its spinoffs. From Our Gang #11-36 (1944-1947), Carl Barks took over the writing and drawing of the series. Barks regularly teamed Barney up with Benny Burro; later, the obnoxious neighbor Mooseface McElk was also introduced.

Mooseface was created for Barks by Western Publishing colleague Gil Turner, who wrote and drew the Barney stories for several years after Barks' run ended. Later, post-Turner talents introduced other characters, including Barney's nephews Fuzzy and Wuzzy. Another artist who worked on Barney Bear was Lynn Karp.

In 2011, Yoe Books issued a hardback volume collecting Carl Barks' work on the series.

=== List of comics ===
- Our Gang Comics (1947) (Dell)
- Our Gang With Tom & Jerry (1949) (Dell)
- Barney Bear Comics (1949) (Magazine Management-Australia)
- Barney Bear's Bumper Book Of Comics (1950) (Rosnock-Australia)
- Woody Woodpecker Back to School (1952) (Dell)
- Tom & Jerry Winter Carnival (1952) (Dell)
- M.G.M.'s Tom & Jerry's Winter Fun #3 (1954) (Dell)
- M.G.M.'s Tom & Jerry's Winter Fun #4 (1955) (Dell)
- M.G.M.'s Tom & Jerry's Winter Fun #5 (1956) (Dell)
- M.G.M.'s Tom & Jerry's Winter Fun #6 (1957) (Dell)
- M.G.M's The Mouse Musketeers (1957) (Dell)
- Tom and Jerry's Summer Fun (1957) (Dell)
- M.G.M.'s Tom & Jerry's Winter Fun #7 (1958) (Dell)
- Tom & Jerry Picnic Time (1958) (Dell)
- Tom and Jerry Comics (1962) (Dell)
- Golden Comics Digest (1970) (Gold Key)
- TV Comic Annual (1975) (Polystyle)
- Tom and Jerry Winter Special (1977)
- Tom and Jerry Holiday Special (1978) (Polystyle)
- Tom and Jerry (1979) (Gold Key)
- Barks Bear Book (1979) (Editions Enfin)
- Tom & Jerry Julehefte (1987) (Semic International)
- Tex Avery's Wolf & Red #1 (1995) (Dark Horse Comics) (appearance as a plush toy bear)
- Carl Barks' Big Book of Barney Bear (2011) (IDW Publishing)
