= The Bear That Couldn't Sleep =

1939 film by Rudolf Ising

- Title card
- Directed by: Rudolf Ising
- Produced by: Rudolf Ising; Fred Quimby (uncredited)
- Music by: Scott Bradley (uncredited)
- Color process: Technicolor
- Production company: Metro-Goldwyn-Mayer
- Distributed by: Loew's, Inc.
- Release date: June 10, 1939
- Running time: 8 min
- Country: United States
- Language: English

The Bear That Couldn't Sleep is a 1939 American animated short film directed by Rudolf Ising. Released with the feature film 6,000 Enemies on June 10, 1939, it is the first appearance of the then-unnamed Barney Bear, who became the studio's first break-out star. It was released as a Gold Medal Reprint in 1953, rendering the original film lost.

== Plot ==
As autumn draws to a close, and snow covers the forest, Barney Bear prepares for his winter's hibernation. But water leaks, a loose shutter, a noisy fire, a teakettle left on, and some stray embers all get in the way and keep him up until spring.

After Barney puts a "Do Not Disturb until Spring" sign on his front door, he locks it and sets his alarm to go off at Spring. When he finally heads to bed, he ties up a leaking root but his hot water bottle starts leaking as well. Before he is able to cry about it, the leaky root he tied up also bursts, pouring water all over him. Soon afterwards his window bursts open, thanks to the wind, and blows a bunch of snow all over him. Barney finally boards the window up, and tries to go to sleep until the fireplace cracks and makes the kettle whistle. Barney pulls it from the fire, and the whine dies down, but when he looks at the kettle, it whines again and shoots him in the face with a puff of steam.

He turns to set the kettle down, but a pair of coals pop and dance into his pajama bottoms. He returns to bed, and whenever the coals pop inside his pants, he looks back at the fire angrily to try and hush it. He climbs into bed, entirely unaware of the smoke pouring out of his bottom. But, soon enough, he starts to sniff and smell the smoke, and after a good doubletake, he finally understands it is coming from him. However, he is too late, and the coals pop loudly and sharply under his backside, and he is sent flying in a cloud of smoke towards the ceiling, and then back down roughly onto his bed. He runs to find some way to put out the fire as alarms blare on the soundtrack, and finally, he decides to unlock his front door, and then zips to the nearest snowhill and soothes his burnt rear in the calming snow.

All better now, with the fire put out for good, Barney can only watch helplessly as the wind not only shuts his front door with him on the outside of it, but fate smacks him, too, by allowing the locks to engage themselves on its closure. Barney remembers his window, but does not remember the barricade that he built inside of it, and when he tries to dive through it, his progress is painfully impeded by the wall of furniture and household goods. Barney takes two casual steps back, and after pausing briefly, turns into a whirlwind of fury and smashes clean through the barricade! As the camera strolls through his cave, the destruction is almost total: every piece of anything inside Barney domicile is smashed to bits, and as he stares in numb shock at the camera, a spring from his bed pops up and smacks him in the chin.

Barney crashes through his boarded up window and is still insomniac, mainly because of his record player which he destroys in seconds.

After tapping his foot and staring at the ticking clock, Barney lies back down and tries counting sheep. His rough, exhausted voice counts out each number as he keeps a deathgrip on his pillow, his reddened eyes droopy and filled with spidery cracks. As he counts, the ticking of the clock grows louder, and the eerie faces of baaing sheep and lambs are superimposed over closeups of clock gears, springs and alarm bells. Barney count reaches the 500's, and then he ends up at "one million, nine hundred and seventy-nine thousand, seven hundred and ninety-nine", and when he is shown in his bed, he is half in and half out of his dream of vast crowds of cute, baaing lambs. He finally falls into snoring, but just as he does, Barney awakens to the clanging of his month alarm, and spies with horror that a little buzzer announcing the arrival of Spring has gone off, as well. He hears the happy chirping of a bluebird outside his home, and he sticks his head out of his window to see its beauty. Shocked, he says simply and wearily, "Spring..." but then is hit in the head with more drops of water. He looks up, and discovers it is the melting snow from his roof, as the bluebird chirps us through iris out

== See also ==
- The Rookie Bear
- Bah Wilderness
- Goggle Fishing Bear
- Wee-Willie Wildcat
- Bird-Brain Bird Dog
