= The Fishing Bear =

1940 film by Rudolf Ising

- Title card
- Directed by: Rudolf Ising
- Produced by: Rudolf Ising; Fred Quimby (uncredited)
- Music by: Scott Bradley (uncredited)
- Color process: Technicolor
- Production company: Metro-Goldwyn-Mayer
- Distributed by: Loew's, Inc.
- Release date: January 10, 1940
- Running time: 7 min
- Country: United States
- Language: English

The Fishing Bear is a 1940 American animated short film directed by Rudolf Ising. It is the second appearance of the then-unnamed Barney Bear. It was released as a Gold Medal Reprint in 1947 and 1957, rendering the original film lost, though the original title card was discovered in an auction.

== Plot ==
Barney Bear arrives a pond to fish just as the fish begin to emerge. He uses bait to lure fish, including a fish who wants to join the army after being intrigued by a coupon on the box. A duck sabotages Barney's efforts. In an attempt to shoo the duck, he drops his bait which the fish steal. He engages in a chase with the fish and the duck. The fish lures an electric eel to the fishing pole, electrocuting Barney and the duck. Barney sinks into the water and gives up.
