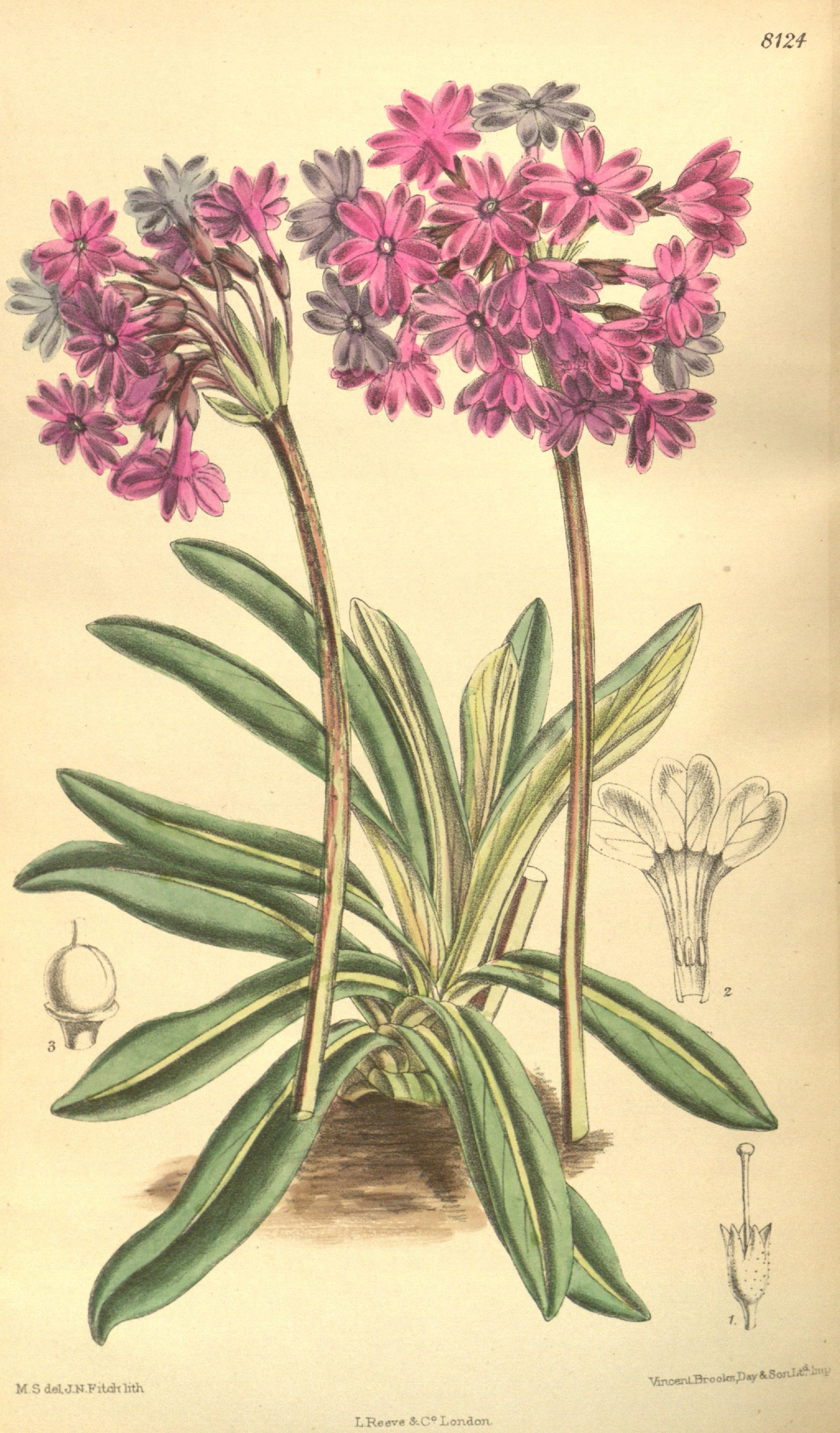

Conservation status
- Data Deficient (IUCN 3.1)

Scientific classification
- Kingdom: Plantae
- Clade: Tracheophytes
- Clade: Angiosperms
- Clade: Eudicots
- Clade: Asterids
- Order: Ericales
- Family: Primulaceae
- Genus: Primula
- Species: P. deorum

Binomial name
- Primula deorum Velen.

= Primula deorum =

Species of flowering plant

Primula deorum, also known as Rila primrose, Rila cowslip or God's cowslip, is a flowering dicot plant of the genus Primula in the family Primulaceae. This alpine plant is endemic to roughly 63 km^{2} (24 sq mi) above the tree-line (especially around 2,200 metres (7,220 ft) in the Rila mountains in Bulgaria, where it grows in small groups in acid, boggy soil near streams and pools and in boggy soil. Its elongate green leaves form rosettes. The blooms are red-purple, borne in asymmetrical umbels high above the leaves. This plant has survived the last glacial period as a relict organism.

It is sometimes offered as an ornamental, but is difficult to cause to flower. The best success comes from a well-aerated, wet medium consisting partly or entirely of sphagnum; flowing water is advisable.

The name "God's cowslip" and the species epithet deorum refer to the presence of this species on Musala, "God's Mountain", though it is much more common above Malyovitsa, where it is the dominant plant in suitable spots.

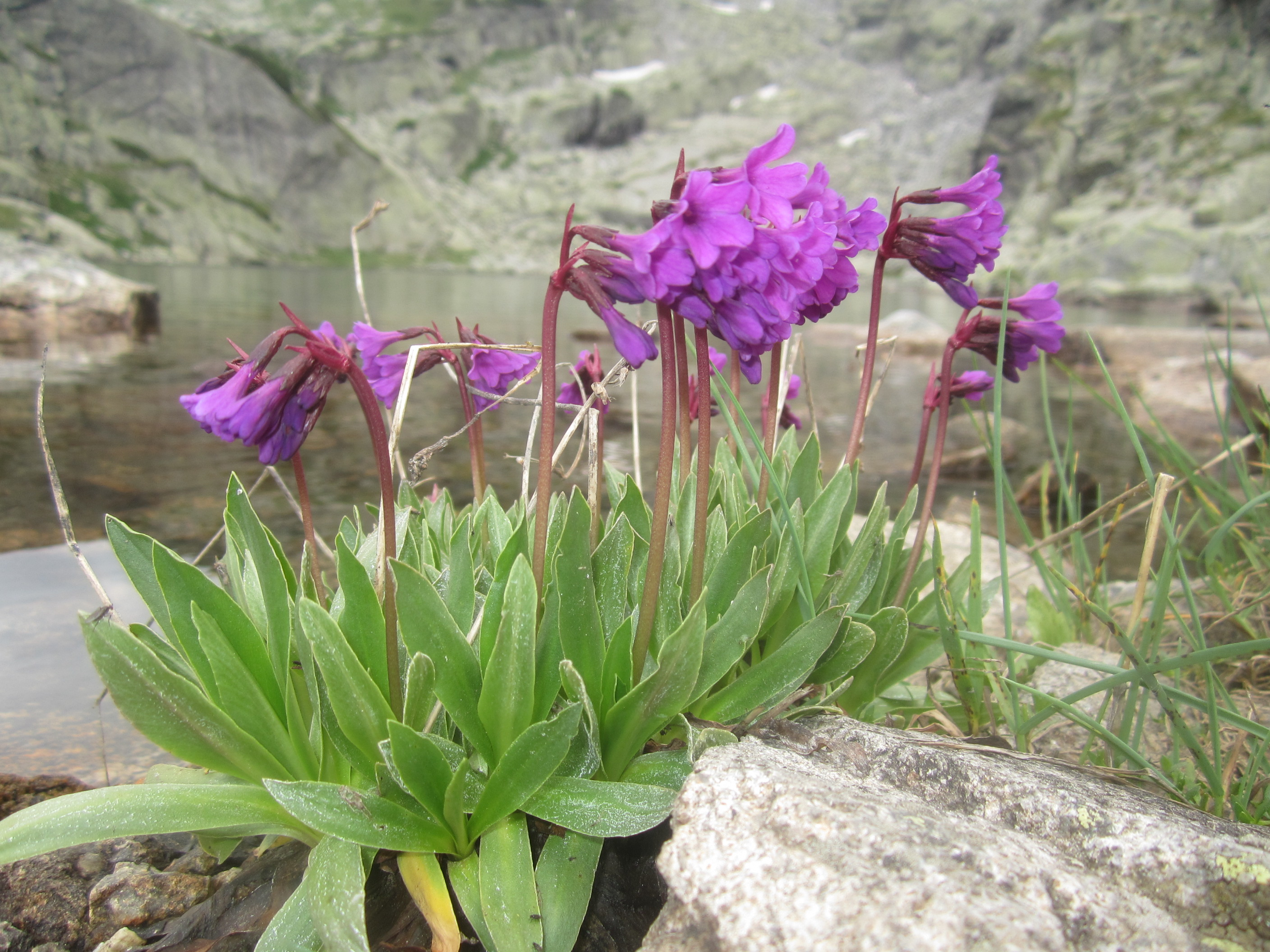
Primula deorum
