= Bah Wilderness =

- Directed by: Rudolf Ising
- Produced by: Fred Quimby; Rudolf Ising
- Starring: Harlow Wilcox; Jeanne Dunn
- Music by: Scott Bradley
- Animation by: Michael Lah; Carl Urbano; Don Williams; Rudy Zamora (all uncredited)
- Color process: Technicolor
- Production company: MGM Cartoons
- Distributed by: Metro-Goldwyn-Mayer
- Release date: February 13, 1943
- Running time: 7:14
- Language: English

Bah Wilderness is an MGM cartoon, featuring Barney Bear, who goes camping out in the forest, similar to his first cartoon, The Bear That Couldn't Sleep. It is the ninth Barney Bear cartoon.

== Plot ==
Barney Bear goes camping in a forest. He finds a small clearing in the woods and begins to set up camp. He starts off by inflating a "Snuggly Wuggly Water Mattress Sleeping Bag", then gets changed to his pajamas, with all the animals watching him. Barney scares them off, puts on his PJs and throws his boot at a noisy wolf, only to have it thrown back at him.

Unbeknownst to him, a porcupine had snuck under Barney's covers. He finally goes to bed and runs up a tree when the porcupine spikes his bottom. Barney gets back down and sets up bear traps and mouse traps around his camp, only to fall for them himself when a squirrel wakes him up with the radio.

Barney falls asleep after hearing a lullaby, but the air tube of his water mattress gets sucked into his mouth causing him to accidentally pump a lot more air into his sleeping bag, overinflating it in his sleep, but he suddenly awakens just about a second before his sleeping bag bursts, causing a flood that Barney decides to sleep under.

== See also ==
- The Bear That Couldn't Sleep
- The Rookie Bear
- Goggle Fishing Bear
- Wee-Willie Wildcat
- Bird-Brain Bird Dog
- The Fishing Bear
