= Bird-Brain Bird Dog =

Bird Brain Bird Dog
- Directed by: Dick Lundy
- Story by: Heck Allen; Jack Cosgriff
- Produced by: Fred Quimby
- Music by: Scott Bradley
- Animation by: Robert Bentley; Walter Clinton; Grant Simmons
- Color process: Technicolor
- Production company: MGM Cartoons
- Distributed by: Metro-Goldwyn-Mayer
- Release date: July 31, 1954
- Running time: 6:31
- Language: English

Bird-Brain Bird Dog is a 1954 animated short film, directed by Dick Lundy for MGM as part of Metro-Goldwyn-Mayer's Barney Bear series, involving Barney getting himself an uncooperative dog to hunt birds. It is the 26th Barney Bear short. This is also the last Barney Bear cartoon in the 1950s and in the original era.

== Plot ==
As quail season opens, Barney Bear goes downtown to buy himself a bird dog to hunt quail. Unbeknownst to him, he ends up getting a bird-loving dog. While out hunting, he tells the dog to get him "something to shoot at", so it sets up some cans along the fence for him. But when Barney tells him to hunt for birds with him, the dog refuses, showing off his Bird Lovers card. The dog then runs out into the woods to save a baby quail while Barney tries hunting for it.

The dog tries to trick Barney by pulling off a disappearing magic trick, but is busted and the bird escapes. Barney tries to shoot it but the dog pulls an entire blade of grass out from under Barney like a mat, tripping him. Barney chases the bird and hides behind a tree, to which the dog sneaks up behind him and draws the quail on his trouser seat. The dog shows it to Barney and, thinking it is the real bird, shoots himself in the rear.

Barney then coaxes the bird out of hiding, by placing a trail of bird seed that leads into his gun. Barney attempts to run home with the bird, but is tripped again by the dog and his gun is broken in half. The bird once again escapes to the railroad tracks. Barney tries shooting the bird again, and the bird runs away from the oncoming bullets. After the dog switches the tracks, the bullets fly around and hit Barney's bottom again.

The chase continues until Barney has the dog and bird cornered in a bush and fires at them. The dog pours ketchup all over him and pretends to have been shot. Barney ends up saying "Please don't die. I'll do anything!" to which the dog holds up a Bird Lover's Pledge to never harm another bird again, which Barney reluctantly signs. A bird closes Barney's eyes which has his eyelid say "The End" and that concludes "Bird-Brain Bird Dog".

== See also ==
- The Bear That Couldn't Sleep
- The Rookie Bear
- Bah Wilderness
- Goggle Fishing Bear
- Wee-Willie Wildcat
