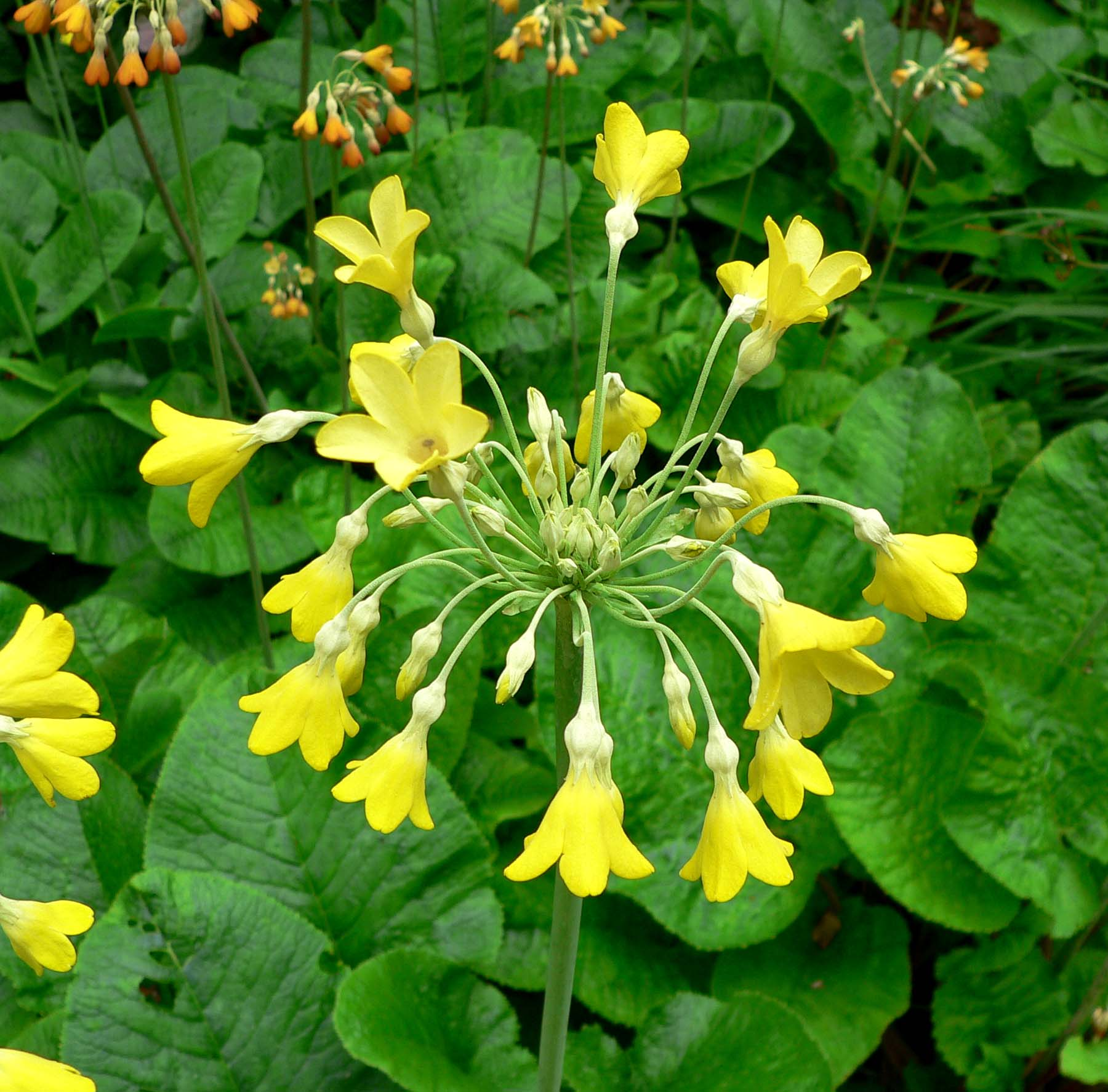

Scientific classification
- Kingdom: Plantae
- Clade: Tracheophytes
- Clade: Angiosperms
- Clade: Eudicots
- Clade: Asterids
- Order: Ericales
- Family: Primulaceae
- Genus: Primula
- Species: P. florindae

Binomial name
- Primula florindae Kingdon-Ward

Synonyms
- Aleuritia florindae (Kingdon-Ward) Soják

= Primula florindae =

Species of flowering plant

Primula florindae, the Tibetan cowslip or giant cowslip, is a species of flowering plant in the family Primulaceae. It is native to southeastern Tibet, where it grows in huge numbers close to rivers such as the Tsangpo. It is a substantial herbaceous perennial growing to 120 cm (47 in) tall by 90 cm (35 in) wide. In summer the flower stalks rise from basal rosettes of 5–20 cm (2–8 in) long leaves. They bear clusters of 20–40 yellow, pendant, bell-like, delicately scented flowers with a mealy white bloom.

The plant was first collected for western horticulture in 1924 by the British botanist Frank Kingdon-Ward, and was named after his wife Florinda.

This plant grows best in very moist conditions as its home is the margins of rivers. It is cold-hardy as long as its roots are not allowed to dry out.

It has gained the Royal Horticultural Society's Award of Garden Merit.
