= Robert Bentley (animator) =

American animator (1907–2000)

- Born: Robert Jarvis Bentley; March 11, 1907; Philadelphia, Pennsylvania, U.S.
- Died: November 28, 2000 (aged 93)
- Other name: Bob Bentley
- Occupation: Animator
- Years active: 1929–1973
- Known for: Animation work with Warner Bros., Fleischer Studios, MGM, Tex Avery, Walter Lantz Productions, UPA, Hanna-Barbera, Filmation
- Notable work: Gulliver's Travels, Andy Panda, Woody Woodpecker, Star Trek: The Animated Series, Spider-Man (1967)

Robert Jarvis Bentley (March 11, 1907 – November 28, 2000) was an American animator who worked for Warner Bros. Cartoons, Fleischer Studios, the Metro-Goldwyn-Mayer cartoon department, Tex Avery, Walter Lantz Productions, UPA, Hanna-Barbera and Filmation among others.

== Early life ==
Bentley was born in Philadelphia on March 11, 1907, the eldest child of three to John Harrison Bentley, Jr. and Hannah Helen Jarvis Bentley. John Harrison Bentley died in 1918, and later Hannah Helen married pioneer animator Leslie Elton, although this marriage did not last.

== Career ==
Bentley started his animation career in 1929 as an assistant animator at the Van Beuren cartoon studio in New York City, later working for Les Elton's independent studio on his 1931 cartoon "Simon the Monk". He moved to the West Coast in 1935 to work briefly at Walt Disney's studio, then spent the next few years as a full-fledged animator in Frank Tashlin's unit at Leon Schlesinger's cartoon studio for Warner Bros. Pictures. In 1939, Bentley, along with other Tashlin animators like Joe D'Igalo and Nelson Demorest, moved to Miami to work for Fleischer Studios, as they were hiring experienced West Coast animators to tool up for their first animated feature, Gulliver's Travels.

In the early 40s, Bentley returned to California to animate for the Walter Lantz studio on Andy Panda and Woody Woodpecker cartoons, and by the mid-40s was a top animator of both Tex Avery's and Dick Lundy's animation units at MGM's cartoon department. Bentley spent the majority of the 50s animating back at Lantz's studio, before being hired by Hanna-Barbera to work primarily on TV animation. From then on, he bounced between stints at numerous television animation studios like DePatie-Freleng and Filmation, where he contributed to such animated productions as Star Trek: The Animated Series (1973–1974), Spider-Man (1967), and others.

== Selected filmography ==
- Little Beau Porky
- Porky's Romance
- Porky's Railroad
- The Case of the Stuttering Pig
- The Woods Are Full of Cuckoos
- Wholly Smoke
- The Fresh Vegetable Mystery
- Gulliver's Travels
- Fightin Pals
- Under the Spreading Blacksmith Shop
- Good-Bye Mr. Moth
- Nutty Pine Cabin
- Ration Bored
- Uncle Tom's Cabaña
- Slap Happy Lion
- King-Size Canary
- Little 'Tinker
- Barney's Hungry Cousin
- Maw and Paw
- Hot Noon (or 12 O'Clock for Sure)
- Chilly Willy
- The Three Little Pups
- Sleepy-Time Squirrel
- Homesteader Droopy
- Bird-Brain Bird Dog
- The Farm of Tomorrow
- Witch Crafty
- Private Eye Pooch
- Bedtime Bedlam
- After the Ball
- Chief Charlie Horse
- Woodpecker from Mars
- Niagara Fools
- Red Riding Hoodlum
- Round Trip to Mars
- Mister Magoo (TV Series)
- Pistol Packin' Woodpecker
- The Yogi Bear Show (TV Series)
- Beetle Bailey (TV Series)
- Linus the Lionhearted (TV Series)
- The Marvel Super Heroes (TV Series)
- The Archie Show (TV Series)
- The Batman/Superman Hour (TV Series)
- Fantastic Voyage (TV Series)
- Here Comes the Grump
- Spider-Man (TV Series)
- Doctor Dolittle (TV Series)
- Don't Hustle an Ant with Muscle
- Treasure Island
- Lassie's Rescue Rangers (TV Series)
- Mission: Magic! (TV Series)
- My Favorite Martians (TV Series)
- Star Trek: The Animated Series
- Oliver Twist
