= Dick Lundy (animator) =

American animator and director (1907–1990)

- Born: Richard James Lundy; August 14, 1907; Sault Ste. Marie, Michigan, U.S.
- Died: April 7, 1990 (aged 82); San Diego, California, U.S.
- Occupations: Animator, film director
- Employer(s): Walt Disney Productions (1929–1943); Walter Lantz Productions (1943–1949); MGM (1949–1953); Hanna-Barbera (1959–1973)
- Known for: Creation of Donald Duck

Richard James "Dick" Lundy (August 14, 1907 – April 7, 1990) was an American animator and film director who worked at several animation studios including Walt Disney Productions, MGM, Walter Lantz Productions, and Hanna-Barbera. Lundy was a pioneer of personality animation and is best remembered as one of the creators of Donald Duck. Throughout his career, he worked as a primary animator on at least 60 films, both short and feature-length, and directed 51 shorts.

== Early life ==
Lundy was born in Sault Ste. Marie, Michigan, to James and Minnie Lundy, their only child. Shortly after his birth the family moved to Detroit, where Lundy's father worked as an inspector for the Burroughs adding machine Company.

When Lundy was ten years old, his parents separated and he and his mother went to live in Port Huron north of Detroit. They later moved back to the city where Lundy's mother worked as a waitress. Lundy moved to Los Angeles in the late 1920s.

== Career ==
In 1929, Lundy was employed by Walt Disney Productions, becoming the studio's dance specialist; animating many of the musical numbers in early Silly Symphony and Mickey Mouse shorts. He later worked on Three Little Pigs (1933) and Orphan's Benefit (1934). After working on Snow White and the Seven Dwarfs (1937), Lundy became a director at Disney.

In late 1943, Lundy was left without anymore directorial assignments before being fired by Disney. Initially devastated, Lundy soon found work at Walter Lantz Productions. He started as an animator and again became a director. He directed shorts featuring Andy Panda, Woody Woodpecker, and the Swing Symphonies. Lundy became the studios primary director in late-1946, and was noted for shifting the studios direction to a style more in vain to works made by Disney and MGM, a stark contrast when compared to work by the studio's previous director, James Culhane. Lundy worked for Wolff Productions after the Lantz studio temporarily closed in 1949. The Lantz studio would reopen in 1950 and remain in business until 1972, but Lundy never worked at Lantz again. While at Wolff, Lundy worked on television commercials. In 1950, he worked for MGM on Barney Bear shorts and the Droopy film Caballero Droopy.

In 1959 Lundy worked for Hanna-Barbera on The Flintstones, Yogi Bear, and Scooby-Doo. He retired in 1973, but continued to do freelance work for several years thereafter.

== Donald Duck ==
Lundy was not the first to draw or even animate Donald Duck. The character was created by Swiss-born designer Albert Hurter and animated by Art Babbitt and Dick Huemer for the short film The Wise Little Hen (1934). This was Donald's first appearance, although the story offered little opportunity for character development. This would come in Donald's second appearance, Orphan's Benefit (also 1934), in which Lundy was the sole animator of Donald. According to common animation practice, the audio and voices of the film were recorded first and were then played for the animators to reference. In listening to voice actor Clarence Nash portray the Duck in Orphan's Benefit, Lundy said "[I] decided that [Donald] was an ego-show-off. If anything crossed him, he got mad and blew his top."

== Personal life ==
Lundy was married three times. His first marriage with Anne Lundy resulted in two children. The two divorced and he moved to Toluca Lake, Los Angeles. In 1932, he married Juanita Sheridan, who also worked at the Disney studio. This marriage was short and ended in divorce in 1934.

By 1939, Lundy was remarried to Mabel Lundy. Together they had one daughter Llewellyn.

== Filmography ==
=== Films ===
==== Disney (and other films) period ====
In this period, most of the films in which Lundy worked belong to Disney

- Playful Pan (animator - uncredited) (1930)
- Pioneer Days (animator - uncredited) (1930)
- Winter (animator - uncredited) (1930)
- The Picnic (animator - uncredited) (1930)
- The Gorilla Mystery (animator - uncredited) (1930)
- Monkey Melodies (animator - uncredited) (1930)
- The Chain Gang (animator - uncredited) (1930)
- Night (animator - uncredited) (1930)
- The Shindig (animator - uncredited) (1930)
- Midnight in a Toy Shop (animator - uncredited) (1930)
- The Ugly Duckling (animator - uncredited) (1931)
- Mickey's Orphans (animator - uncredited) (1931)
- Mickey Cuts Up (animator - uncredited) (1931)
- The Beach Party (animator - uncredited) (1931)
- Blue Rhythm (animator - uncredited) (1931)
- The China Plate (animator - uncredited) (1931)
- The Moose Hunt (animator) (1931)
- Mother Goose Melodies (animator - uncredited) (1931)
- The Castaway (animator) (1931)
- Traffic Troubles (animator - uncredited) (1931)
- Birds of a Feather (animator - uncredited) (1931)
- The Birthday Party (animator - uncredited) (1931)
- Mickey's Good Deed (animator - uncredited) (1932)
- The Duck Hunt (animator - uncredited) (1932)
- Babes in the Woods (animator - uncredited) (1932)
- The Whoopee Party (animator - uncredited) (1932)
- Trader Mickey (animator - uncredited) (1932)
- Flowers and Trees (animator - uncredited) (1932)
- Just Dogs (animator - uncredited) 1932
- Mickey in Arabia (animator - uncredited) (1932)
- Puppy Love (animator - uncredited) (1933)
- Mickey's Mechanical Man (animator - uncredited) (1933)
- Mickey's Gala Premier (animator - uncredited) (1933)
- Three Little Pigs (animator - uncredited) (1933)
- Father Noah's Ark (animator - uncredited) (1933)
- Building a Building (animator - uncredited) (1933)
- The Dognapper (animator - uncredited) (1934)
- Mickey Plays Papa (animator - uncredited) (1934)
- Orphan's Benefit (animator - uncredited) (1934)
- The Wise Little Hen (animator - uncredited) (1934)
- Gulliver Mickey (animator - uncredited) (1934)
- Funny Little Bunnies (animator - uncredited) ( 1934)
- Playful Pluto (animator) (1934)
- The Grasshopper and the Ants (animator - uncredited) (1934)
- Shanghaied (animator - uncredited) (1934)
- Music Land (animator - uncredited) (1935)
- Pluto's Judgement Day (animator) (1935)
- Who Killed Cock Robin? (animator: "Dan Cupid" - uncredited) (1935)
- Mickey's Kangaroo (animator - uncredited) (1935)
- Mickey's Service Station (animator - uncredited) (1935)
- The Tortoise and the Hare (animator - uncredited) (1935)
- Toby Tortoise Returns (animator - uncredited) (1936)
- Thru the Mirror (animator - uncredited) (1936)
- Three Little Wolves (animator - uncredited) (1936)
- Mickey's Grand Opera (animator - uncredited) (1936)
- Orphans' Picnic (animator - uncredited) (1936)
- Snow White and the Seven Dwarfs (animator) (1937)
- Woodland Café (animator - uncredited) (1937)
- Mickey's Parrot (animator - uncredited) (1938)
- Donald's Cousin Gus (animator - uncredited) (1939)
- Society Dog Show (animator - uncredited) (1939)
- Sea Scouts (director) (1939)
- Donald's Lucky Day (animator - uncredited) (1939)
- Mr. Mouse Takes a Trip (animator - uncredited) (1940)
- The Riveter (director) (1940)
- Window Cleaners (animator - uncredited) (1940)
- Pluto's Dream House (animator - uncredited) (1940)
- Mr. Duck Steps Out (animator - uncredited) (1940)
- Timber (animator - uncredited) (1941)
- A Good Time for a Dime (director) (1941)
- Donald's Camera (director) (1941)
- Donald's Gold Mine (animator and director) (1942)
- Donald's Garden (director) (1942)
- The Village Smithy (director-uncredited) (1942)
- The Flying Jalopy (director-uncredited) (1943)
- Donald's Tire Trouble (director) (1943)
- Home Defense (animator) (1943)
- Commando Duck (animator - uncredited) (1944)

==== Woody Woodpecker (and other films) period ====
In this period, most of the films in which Lundy worked belong to Woody Woodpecker's film series

- Fish Fry (animator - uncredited) (1944)
- The Beach Nut (animator) (1944)
- Ski for Two (animator - uncredited) (1944)
- Abou Ben Boogie (animator - uncredited) (1944)
- Chew-Chew Baby (animator - uncredited) (1945)
- Sliphorn King of Polaroo (director) (1945)
- The Enemy Bacteria (director) (1945)
- Crow Crazy (director) (1945)
- The Pied Piper of Basin Street (animator - uncredited) (1945)
- The Poet & Peasant (director) (1946)
- Apple Andy (director) (1946)
- Bathing Buddies (director) (1946)
- Reddy Made Magic (director) (1946)
- The Wacky Weed (director) (1946)
- Musical Moments from Chopin (director) (1946)
- The Egg and I (director) (1947)
- Smoked Hams (director) (1947)
- The Coo Coo Bird (director) (1947)
- The Story of Human Energy (director) (1947)
- The Overture to 'William Tell' (director) (1947)
- Well Oiled (director) (1947)
- Solid Ivory (director) (1947)
- Woody the Giant Killer (director) (1947)
- The Bandmaster (director) (1947)
- The Mad Hatter (director) (1948)
- Banquet Busters (director) (1948)
- Wacky-Bye Baby (director) (1948)
- Pixie Picnic (director) (1948)
- Wet Blanket Policy (director) (1948)
- Wild and Woody! (director) (1948)
- Playful Pelican (director) (1948)
- Dog Tax Dodgers (director) (1948)
- Kiddie Koncert (director) (1948)
- Scrappy Birthday (director) (1949)
- Drooler's Delight (director) (1949)
- Puny Express (director-uncredited, with Walter Lantz) (1950)
- Sleep Happy (director-uncredited, with Walter Lantz) (1951)

==== Metro-Goldwyn-Mayer period ====
In this period, most of the films in which Lundy worked belong to Barney Bear's film series

- Busybody Bear (director) (1952)
- The Little Wise Quacker (director) (1952)
- Caballero Droopy (director) (1952)
- Tom Schuler: Cobbler Statesman (director-uncredited) (1953)
- Half-Pint Palomino (director) (1953)
- Wee-Willie Wildcat (director) (1953)
- Heir Bear (director) (1953)
- Cobs and Robbers (director) (1953)
- Barney's Hungry Cousin (director) (1953)
- The Impossible Possum (director) (1954)
- Sleepy-Time Squirrel (director) (1954)
- Bird-Brain Bird Dog (director) (1954)
- Billy Boy (director-uncredited, with Tex Avery) (1954)

==== Last years as animator ====
- The Man Called Flintstone (animator - credited as Richard Lundy) (1966)
- Fritz the Cat (animator and second layout - credited as Richard Lundy) (1972)
- Charlotte's Web (key animator) (1973)
- Mickey Mouse Disco (animator) (1980)

=== TV ===
- The Woody Woodpecker Show (director) (1957)
- The Huckleberry Hound Show (animator - 7 episodes) (1959–1960)
  - Bear for Punishment/Batty Bat/Huck the Giant Killer (1959)
  - Stranger Ranger/Mighty Mite/A Bully Dog (1959)
  - Papa Yogi/King Size Poodle/Somebody's Lion (1959)
  - Huck Hound's Tale/Party Peeper Jinks/Robot Plot (1960)
  - Spud Dud/High Jinks/Tricks and Treats (1960) (segment "High Jinks")
  - Space Bear/Puss in Boats/Huck's Hack (1960)
  - Hoodwinked Bear/Goldfish Fever/Picadilly Dilly (1960)
- The Quick Draw McGraw Show (animator - 14 episodes) (1959–1961)
- The Flintstones (animator - 60 episodes) (1960–1966)
- Child Sock-Cology (Short) (animator) (1961)
- Count Down Clown (Short) (animator) (1961)
- Snagglepuss (TV Series) (animator - 1 episode) (1961)
  - Royal Rodent (1961)
- Top Cat (animator - 2 episodes) (1961–1962)
  - All That Jazz (1961)
  - Dibble's Double (1962)
- Beef for and After (Short) (animator) (1962)
- The Yogi Bear Show (animator - 6 episodes, 1961 - 1962)
  - Bear Foot Soldiers/Royal Rodent/Judo Ex-Expert (segment "Royal Rodent") (1961)
  - Ice Box Raider/One Two Many/Baddie Buddies (segment "Baddie Buddies") (1961)
  - Disguise and Gals/Remember the Daze/Foxy Proxy (segment "Foxy Proxy") (1961)
  - Genial Genie/The Gangsters All Here/Duck the Music (segment "Genial Genie") (1961)
  - Yogi's Birthday Party (animator/animation supervisor) (1962)
- The Jetsons (animator - 4 episodes) (1962–1963)
  - The Venus (1962)
  - Uniblab (1962)
  - The Coming of Astro (1962)
  - The Little Man (1963)
- Rancid Ransom (Short) (animator) (1962)
- The Hanna-Barbera New Cartoon Series (animator - 2 episodes) (1962)
  - Gator-Napper/Water-Melon Felon/Zero Hero
  - Droopy Dragon/See-Saw/Whale of a Tale
- Common Scents (Short) (animator) (1962)
- Raggedy Rug (Short) (animator) (1964)
- The Magilla Gorilla Show (animator - 9 episodes) (1964–1965)
  - Fairy Godmother (1964)
  - Masquerade Party (1964)
  - Airlift (1964)
  - Mad Avenue Madness (1965)
  - Magilla Mix-Up (1965)
  - Montana Magilla (1965)
  - That Was the Geek That Was (1965)
  - Love at First Fight (1965)
  - Bird Brained (1965)
- The Secret Squirrel Show (animator - 1 episode) (1965)
  - Sub Swiper/Way Out Squiddly/Prince of a Pup
- The Atom Ant Show (animator - 2 episodes) (1966)
  - Killer Diller Gorilla (uncredited)
  - Bully for Atom Ant
- Frankenstein Jr. and The Impossibles (animator) (1966)
- Moby Dick and the Mighty Mightor (animator) (1967)
- The New Adventures of Huckleberry Finn (animator - 5 episodes) (1968–1969)
  - The Magic Shillelah (1968)
  - Huck of La Mancha (1968)
  - The Last Labor of Hercules (1968)
  - The Eye of Doorgah (1968)
  - Mission of Captain Mordecai (1969)
- The Adventures of Gulliver (animator - 1 episode) (1968)
- The Forbidden Pool (1968)
- The Perils of Penelope Pitstop (animator - 6 episodes) (1969)
  - The Treacherous Movie Lot Plot
  - Carnival Calamity
  - Wild West Peril
  - The Boardwalk Booby Trap
  - The Terrible Trolley Trap
  - Jungle Jeopardy
- Josie and the Pussycats (animator - 1 episode) (1970)
  - Plateau of the Apes Plot
- Scooby Doo, Where Are You! (animator - 8 episodes) (1970)
  - Don't Fool with a Phantom
  - Who's Afraid of the Big Bad Werewolf?
  - A Tiki Scare Is No Fair
  - Haunted House Hang-Up
  - Jeepers, It's the Creeper
  - Scooby's Night with a Frozen Fright
  - Mystery Mask Mix-Up
  - Nowhere to Hyde
- Where's Huddles? (animator - 10 episodes) (1970)
  - One Man's Family
  - A Sticky Affair
  - The Odd Trio
  - Get That Letter Back
  - To Catch a Thief
  - Hot Dog Hannah
  - The Offensives
  - The Ramblin' Wreck
  - A Weighty Problem
  - The Old Swimming Hole
- The New Scooby-Doo Movies (animator - 16 episodes) (1972)
- The Roman Holidays (animator - 3 episodes) (1972)
  - Cyrano deHappius
  - Hectic Holiday
  - Double Date
- The ABC Saturday Superstar Movie (animator - 1 episode) (1972)
  - Yogi's Ark Lark
- The Flintstone Comedy Hour (animator - 1972)
- Love, American Style (animator - 1 episode) (1972)
  - Love and the Bachelor Party/Love and the Latin Lover/Love and the Old-Fashioned Father/Love and the Test of Manhood (segment "Love and the Old-Fashioned Father")
- Yogi's Gang (animator - 2 episodes) (1973)
  - Mr. Hothead
  - Dr. Bigot
- ABC Afterschool Specials (animator - 1 episode) (1974)
  - Cyrano (1974)
- Captain Caveman and the Teen Angels (animator - 8 episodes) (1977)
  - Playing Footsie with Bigfoot
  - The Strange Case of the Creature from Space
  - The Fur Freight Fright
  - Cavey and the Weirdo Wolfman
  - The Creepy Claw Caper
  - Double Dribble Riddle
  - The Creepy Case of the Creaky Charter Boat
  - The Mixed Up Mystery of Deadman's Reef
- Woody Woodpecker and His Friends (Video documentary) (original material) (1982)
- Walter, Woody and the World of Animation (Documentary short) (original material) (1982)
- The King of Ads (Documentary) (segment "Coca-Cola commercial") (1991)
