= Mouse Cleaning =

1948 Tom and Jerry cartoon

- Reissue title card
- Directed by: William Hanna; Joseph Barbera
- Story by: William Hanna; Joseph Barbera (both uncredited)
- Produced by: Fred Quimby
- Starring: Lillian Randolph; William Hanna (both uncredited)
- Cinematography: Jack Stevens (uncredited)
- Edited by: Fred McAlpin (uncredited)
- Music by: Scott Bradley
- Animation by: Irven Spence; Kenneth Muse; Ed Barge; Ray Patterson
- Layouts by: Richard Bickenbach (uncredited)
- Backgrounds by: Robert Gentle (uncredited)
- Color process: Technicolor
- Production company: MGM Cartoons
- Distributed by: Metro-Goldwyn-Mayer
- Release date: December 11, 1948 (U.S.)
- Running time: 7:08
- Language: English

Mouse Cleaning is a 1948 one-reel animated cartoon and the 38th Tom and Jerry short. The title is a play on "house cleaning". It was produced in Technicolor and released to theatres on December 11, 1948, by Metro-Goldwyn-Mayer and again on February 18, 1956. It was animated by Irven Spence, Kenneth Muse, Ed Barge and Ray Patterson, who were the usual animators for the Tom and Jerry cartoons in the early 1940s up until the late 1950s. It was produced by Fred Quimby and directed by William Hanna and Joseph Barbera; both men were not credited. The music was scored by Scott Bradley and the backgrounds were created by Robert Gentle.

== Plot ==
While chasing Jerry in the garden, Tom runs through a mud puddle and then into the house, tracking mud on the kitchen floor right after Mammy Two-Shoes has finished cleaning. As punishment, Mammy makes Tom clean the floor and orders him to keep the house clean, while she leaves to go shopping, or "we is gonna be minus one cat around here."

Once she is gone, Jerry wants to sabotage Tom, so he begins making a mess around the house by, among other things, emptying the ashtray onto the floor, squirting ink from a fountain pen into a pail, juggling food, bringing an old horse and pushing an ink stamp pad onto Tom's paws while he takes a nap, causing the cat to leave a long trail of paw prints in the living room.

Tom throws Jerry down the laundry chute into the basement and quickly cleans the room. As he does so, a coal truck arrives at the house to make a delivery, and Jerry uses a rope to pull the truck's delivery chute up to the living room window, causing the house to flood with coal. When Mammy returns from shopping and discovers this, she blames Tom, who flees. As he runs, Mammy throws lumps of coal at him, one of which knocks him out.

== Voice cast ==
Note: All voice actors are uncredited

- Lillian Randolph as Mammy Two Shoes (original)
  - Thea Vidale as Mammy Two Shoes (1990 dubbed version)
- William Hanna as Tom's vocal effects

It is currently unknown who provided the voice of Tom's blackface Stepin Fetchit-style dialect.

== Reception ==
Boxoffice reviewed the short on December 12, 1948, saying, "This is a repeat performance of a common film cartoon gag but amusing nevertheless." Film critic and historian Leonard Maltin praised the short saying it "... typifies the development of this series taking the same story idea as Puss Gets the Boot and playing it in modern Tom-and-Jerry fashion, with hilarious gags, razor-sharp timing, and riveting "takes", or reactions. For sheer belly laughs, this cartoon is difficult to top."

In 2007, this short and Casanova Cat were pulled from the Tom and Jerry Spotlight Collection - Volume 3 DVD compilation by Warner Home Video due to racial stereotypes. It had been announced that Mouse Cleaning would be available on the Tom and Jerry Golden Collection - Volume 2 on DVD and Blu-ray, with the short being presented uncut, uncensored, and restored from its original nitrate elements that had been recently discovered. However, on February 6, 2013, it was announced by TVShowsOnDVD.com that Mouse Cleaning was not part of the list of cartoons on this release, as well as the cartoon Casanova Cat, which was also skipped over on the Spotlight Collection, Volume 3 DVD release. The Golden Collection series was ultimately cancelled due to the negative reception.

On September 9, 2025, it was announced that the Blu-ray and DVD release of Tom and Jerry: The Golden Era Anthology (1940–1958), which was released on December 2, 2025, would include both of the previously banned shorts, marking their first official release on a physical format in North America.

== Production ==
- Written & Directed by William Hanna & Joseph Barbera
- Animation: Ray Patterson, Irv Spence, Kenneth Muse & Ed Barge
- Layouts: Richard Bickenbach
- Backgrounds: Robert Gentle
- Music: Scott Bradley
- Produced by Fred Quimby

== Availability ==
=== VHS ===
- Tom and Jerry's 50th Birthday Classics 3.

=== DVD ===
- Tom and Jerry: The Classic Collection
- Tom and Jerry: The Golden Era Anthology

=== Blu-ray ===
- Tom and Jerry: The Golden Era Anthology
