= Tom and Jerry Golden Collection =

Home video collection

Tom and Jerry Golden Collection was a scrapped series of two-disc DVD and Blu-ray sets produced by Warner Home Video that was expected to collect all 161 theatrical Tom and Jerry cartoon shorts released by Metro-Goldwyn-Mayer from the 1940s through the 1960s. Only the first of the three planned volumes was released, on October 25, 2011. It features 37 shorts, roughly one-third of the 113 Tom and Jerry shorts that had been included in the Tom and Jerry Spotlight Collection, a previous DVD series that focused on the shorts directed by William Hanna and Joseph Barbera from 1940 to 1958.

A second volume, containing the next 42 shorts, was initially scheduled to be released on June 11, 2013, but was later canceled indefinitely.

The first volume Blu-ray was reissued, released this time by Warner Archive Collection, on March 17, 2020, after having been out-of-print for several years.

In late 2025, the Tom and Jerry Golden Collection series was superseded by the Tom and Jerry: The Golden Era Anthology Blu-ray set.

== Differences with Spotlight Collection ==
Warner Home Video had previously released the majority of the original 114 Hanna-Barbera-directed shorts in the Spotlight Collection over three volumes. The primary differences between the Spotlight Collection and the Golden Collection is that the latter was intended to feature the shorts in chronological order and uncensored. Also, because most of the original pre-1951 MGM cartoon negatives were destroyed in the MGM vault fire of 1965, the Golden Collection features new, restored transfers from CRI negative elements, as opposed to the Turner broadcast television prints previously used. The Golden Collection is being released on both DVD and Blu-ray (the latter restored to HD quality), whereas the Spotlight Collection was only available on DVD. Some of the first shorts were already remastered for the second volume of the Spotlight Collection and these versions also are used in this release.

Lastly, according to animation historian Jerry Beck on his March 2012 appearance on Stu's Show, the Golden Collection series will feature the later, 1960s shorts directed by Gene Deitch and Chuck Jones in addition to the Hanna-Barbera shorts. Although the shorts are presented digitally restored (just like how it was shown in theaters), however, because many of the original pre-1951 MGM cartoon negatives are destroyed in the aforementioned GEH fire, some of the pre-1951 Tom and Jerry cartoons were restored using their Metrocolor negatives which were their 1960s television transfers so some of the cartoons couldn't be presented in pristine condition.

=== Controversy ===
It had been announced that Mouse Cleaning would be available on the Tom and Jerry Golden Collection - Volume 2 on DVD and Blu-ray, with the short being presented uncut, uncensored, remastered, and restored from its original nitrate elements that had been recently discovered. The set was originally scheduled to be released on June 11, 2013. However, on February 6, 2013, it was announced by TVShowsOnDVD.com that Mouse Cleaning was not a part of the list of cartoons set to be on the release, as well as the cartoon Casanova Cat, which was also skipped over on the Spotlight Collection, Volume 3 DVD release in 2007 - both cartoons featured controversial content: specifically brief scenes of the characters of Tom and Jerry in blackface. When asked for an interview request, a Warner Bros. spokesperson said: "The company felt that certain content would be exceedingly inappropriate for the intended audience and therefore excluded several shorts." Many collectors and fans proceeded to post negative reviews of the product on Amazon and other various websites in protest. Many of them also noted the hypocrisy of this decision, pointing out that several other cartoons with similar – and in some cases, even more offensive – racial stereotypes were also planned to be included on the set uncut – including the infamous His Mouse Friday – with no objections from the Warner Bros. legal team. In addition, Jerry Beck, who already wrote liner notes for both shorts for the release, was shocked to hear about the omissions, saying that he wrote notes for both cartoons and that they were supposed to be included on the set.

On April 1, 2013, following the numerous complaints from fans and collectors, the second set was confirmed to be canceled indefinitely. Restored prints made for the set can be purchased on the iTunes Store.

== Releases ==
=== Golden Collection, Vol. 1 ===
DVD release of Volume 1

Volume One was released on October 25, 2011, in the US and in France on November 23, 2011. All of the shorts are shown in their original 4:3 aspect ratio.

==== Disc 1 ====
1. Puss Gets the Boot# (1940)
2. The Midnight Snack (1941)
3. The Night Before Christmas# (1941)
4. Fraidy Cat (1942)
5. Dog Trouble (1942)
6. Puss n' Toots* (1942) CRI
7. The Bowling Alley Cat* (1942) CRI
8. Fine Feathered Friend (1942)
9. Sufferin' Cats!* (1943) CRI
10. The Lonesome Mouse* (1943) CRI
11. The Yankee Doodle Mouse# (1943)
12. Baby Puss (1943)
13. The Zoot Cat* (1944) CRI
14. The Million Dollar Cat* (1944) CRI
15. The Bodyguard (1944)
16. Puttin' on the Dog* (1944) CRI
17. Mouse Trouble*# (1944) CRI
18. The Mouse Comes to Dinner (1945)
19. Mouse in Manhattan (1945)
20. Tee for Two (1945)

An asterisk (*) indicates that the cartoon is restored with washed-out colors and has the 1960 MGM Metrocolor logo with Leo the Lion due to Metrocolor.

A hash (#) indicates that the cartoon has been previously seen on either the Warner Bros. Home Entertainment Academy Awards Animation Collection or the Spotlight Collection Volume 2 DVD sets.

==== Special features ====
- The Midnight Snack pencil test
- Commentaries by Animators and Historians on five titles
1. Mark Kausler on Puss Gets the Boot
2. Nicole Parker and Earl Kress on Puss Gets the Boot
3. Michael Mallory on The Night Before Christmas
4. Nicole Parker and Earl Kress on The Night Before Christmas
5. Michael Mallory on The Yankee Doodle Mouse
6. Jerry Beck on The Zoot Cat
7. Michael Mallory on Mouse Trouble

==== Disc 2 ====
1. Flirty Birdy (1945)
2. Quiet Please!*# (1945) CRI
3. Springtime for Thomas (1946)
4. The Milky Waif* (1946) CRI
5. Trap Happy (1946)
6. Solid Serenade (1946)
7. Cat Fishin' (1947)
8. Part Time Pal (1947)
9. The Cat Concerto# (1947)
10. Dr. Jekyll and Mr. Mouse# (1947)
11. Salt Water Tabby (1947)
12. A Mouse in the House (1947)
13. The Invisible Mouse (1947)
14. Kitty Foiled (1948)
15. The Truce Hurts (1948)
16. Old Rockin' Chair Tom (1948)
17. Professor Tom (1948)

An asterisk (*) indicates that the cartoon is restored with washed-out colors and has the 1960 MGM Metrocolor logo with Leo the Lion due to Metrocolor.

A hash (#) indicates that the cartoon has been previously seen on the Warner Bros. Home Entertainment Academy Awards Animation Collection DVD set.

==== Special features ====
- Vaudeville, Slapstick and Tom and Jerry featurette (HD quality)
- How Bill and Joe Met Tom and Jerry featurette
- The Comedy Stylings of Tom and Jerry featurette
- Excerpt from Anchors Aweigh
- Commentaries by Animators and Historians on four titles
1. Mark Kausler on Quiet Please!
2. Eric Goldberg on The Cat Concerto
3. Michael Mallory on Dr. Jekyll and Mr. Mouse
4. Nicole Parker and Earl Kress on Dr. Jekyll and Mr. Mouse
5. Jerry Beck on Kitty Foiled

=== Golden Collection, Vol. 2 ===
Volume Two was scheduled for release on June 11, 2013, before being canceled by Warner Home Video.

==== Disc 1 ====
1. Mouse Cleaning^ x (1948)
2. Polka-Dot Puss (1949)
3. The Little Orphan# (1949)
4. Hatch Up Your Troubles# (1949)
5. Heavenly Puss* (1949)
6. The Cat and the Mermouse (1949)
7. Love That Pup (1949)
8. Jerry's Diary* (1949)
9. Tennis Chumps (1949)
10. Little Quacker^ (1950)
11. Saturday Evening Puss (1950)
12. Texas Tom (1950)
13. Jerry and the Lion (1950)
14. Safety Second (1950)
15. The Hollywood Bowl (1950)
16. The Framed Cat (1950)
17. Cue Ball Cat (1950)
18. Casanova Cat x (1951)
19. Jerry and the Goldfish (1951)
20. Jerry's Cousin# (1951)
21. Sleepy-Time Tom (1951)

An asterisk (*) indicates that the cartoon has been restored with washed-out colors due to Metrocolor.

A hash (#) indicates that the cartoon has previously been seen on the Academy Awards Animation Collection.

^ denotes that it is restored with its original opening titles.

An X indicates that it was intended for the set but was removed by Warner Home Video.

==== Disc 2 ====
1. His Mouse Friday (1951)
2. Slicked-up Pup (1951)
3. Nit-Witty Kitty (1951)
4. Cat Napping (1951)
5. The Flying Cat (1952)
6. The Duck Doctor (1952)
7. The Two Mouseketeers (1952)
8. Smitten Kitten (1952)
9. Triplet Trouble (1952)
10. Little Runaway (1952)
11. Fit to Be Tied (1952)
12. Push-Button Kitty (1952)
13. Cruise Cat (1952)
14. The Dog House (1952)
15. The Missing Mouse (1953)
16. Jerry and Jumbo (1953)
17. Johann Mouse #(1953)
18. That's My Pup! (1953)
19. Just Ducky (1953)
20. Two Little Indians (1953)
21. Life with Tom (1953)

A hash (#) indicates that the cartoon has previously been seen on the Academy Awards Animation Collection.

==== Special features ====
- Animal Hijinks: The Friends and Foes of Tom and Jerry featurette
- Behind the Tunes: The MGM Orchestra featurette
- Animators as Actors featurette
- Cat and Mouse: The Tale of Tom and Jerry featurette
- Commentaries by Animators and Historians on Eight Cartoons
1. Michael Mallory on The Little Orphan
2. Michael Mallory on Hatch Up Your Troubles
3. Jerry Beck on Heavenly Puss
4. Nicole Parker and Earl Kress on Saturday Evening Puss
5. Jerry Beck on Jerry’s Cousin
6. Jerry Beck on The Two Mouseketeers
7. Mark Kausler on Push-Button Kitty
8. Mark Kausler on Johann Mouse
- Excerpt from Dangerous When Wet
