= Jerry's Diary =

1949 animated short film directed by William Hanna and Joseph Barbera

- Directed by: William Hanna; Joseph Barbera
- Story by: William Hanna; Joseph Barbera (both uncredited)
- Produced by: Fred Quimby
- Starring: Joseph Forte; William Hanna (both uncredited)
- Cinematography: Jack Stevens (uncredited)
- Edited by: Fred McAlpin (uncredited)
- Music by: Scott Bradley
- Animation by: Kenneth Muse; Archived footage: Ed Barge; Pete Burness (unc.); George Gordon (unc.)
- Layouts by: Richard Bickenbach (uncredited)
- Backgrounds by: Robert Gentle (uncredited)
- Color process: Technicolor
- Production company: MGM Cartoons
- Distributed by: Metro-Goldwyn-Mayer
- Release date: October 5, 1949
- Running time: 6:25
- Language: English

Jerry's Diary is a 1949 one-reel animated cartoon that is the 45th Tom and Jerry short released by Metro-Goldwyn-Mayer as early as October 5, 1949 It directed by William Hanna and Joseph Barbera, produced by Fred Quimby, scored by Scott Bradley, and animated by Kenneth Muse and Ed Barge. It is the first of several compilation Tom and Jerry shorts, integrating footage from previous shorts into the plot.

== Plot ==
Tom sets up traps in front of Jerry's home, but is interrupted by a radio announcement declaring it "Be Kind to Animals" week. He replaces the traps with gifts, but discovers that Jerry is not at home. Instead, he finds Jerry's diary and reads about their past encounters:

- Two scenes from the episode Tee for Two where Jerry has to play the role of Tom's golf ball tee;
- A scene from Mouse Trouble where Tom sets a trap by arousing Jerry's curiosity, only for Jerry to respond in kind;
- The kitchen chase scene from Solid Serenade;
- Scenes from The Yankee Doodle Mouse where Jerry tricks Tom into getting himself blasted by firecrackers.

Each successive entry fans Tom's anger, making him destroy his presents and finally rip up the diary. When the unsuspecting Jerry returns home, Tom tries to grab him, but the radio reminds him to be kind. As a sarcastic response to that message, Tom smashes his last remaining gift - a pie - into Jerry's face, leaving him baffled.

== Voice cast ==
- Joseph Forte as Uncle Dudley
- William Hanna as Tom Cat
- Harry E. Lang as Tom laughing (via archival footage from Mouse Trouble)

== Availability ==
=== VHS ===
- Tom and Jerry's Greatest Chases, Vol. 1 (2000)

=== LaserDisc ===
- The Art of Tom & Jerry: Volume I, Side 9 (1993)

=== DVD ===
- Tom and Jerry's Greatest Chases, Vol. 1 (2000)
- Tom and Jerry: The Classic Collection Volume 2, Side 2 (2004)
- Tom and Jerry Spotlight Collection Vol. 3, Disc One (2007)
- Tom and Jerry: The Golden Era Anthology (2025)

=== Blu-ray ===
- Tom and Jerry: The Golden Era Anthology (2025)
