= Tom and Jerry: The Classic Collection =

Collection of DVDs from Warner Home Video

Tom and Jerry: The Classic Collection is a series of Region 2 DVD sets released by Warner Home Video in 2004. The sets include almost every original theatrical Tom and Jerry short, all in (for the most part) chronological order, on each volume. These DVDs are available in 6 double-sided DVDs (issued in the United Kingdom) and 12 single-layer DVDs (issued throughout Europe and Australia). The DVDs in the UK were re-released as "Collector Editions", which were Digipak versions with 2 volumes inside.

The UK box set version

None of the cartoons in the set have been restored; all were sourced by TV prints created by Turner Entertainment in the 1990s for Cartoon Network and Boomerang airings. Some of the cartoons in these DVD sets are censored due to perceived racial stereotypes.

Shorts produced in CinemaScope are presented in pan and scan for showing on the 4:3 aspect ratio television screen, except for remake shorts The Egg and Jerry, Tops with Pops and Feedin' the Kiddie. These shorts are not in anamorphic widescreen, like the American Spotlight collections; instead, they are in a 4:3 windowbox format and appear to be sourced from the LaserDisc set (The Art of Tom and Jerry) or are an early release of the copies found on the Spotlight releases.

== Key ==
^{2} denotes Cinemascope cartoons in pan and scan
^{3} denotes Oscar winners
^{4} denotes edited TV prints, mainly redubbed Mammy Two Shoes. Other edits as noted.

Released on 5 April 2004 (UK version)

Collector's Edition released on 12 April 2004

== Volume 1 ==
=== Side 1 (Volume 1) ===
1. Puss Gets the Boot^{4}
2. The Midnight Snack^{4}
3. The Night Before Christmas
4. Fraidy Cat^{4}
5. Dog Trouble^{4}
6. Puss n' Toots^{4}
7. The Bowling Alley-Cat^{3}
8. Fine Feathered Friend
9. Sufferin' Cats!
10. The Lonesome Mouse^{4}
11. The Yankee Doodle Mouse
12. Baby Puss

=== Side 2 (Volume 2) ===
1. The Zoot Cat
2. The Bodyguard
3. Puttin' on the Dog
4. Mouse Trouble^{3}
5. The Mouse Comes to Dinner
6. Mouse in Manhattan
7. Tee for Two
8. Flirty Birdy^{4} (muted dialog of the bird, except for the two times he says "Yoo-hoo!")
9. Quiet Please!^{3}
10. Springtime for Thomas
11. The Milky Waif^{4} (blackface gag cut)
12. Trap Happy

== Volume 2 ==
Released on 3 May 2004

=== Side 1 (Volume 3) ===
1. Solid Serenade
2. Cat Fishin'
3. Part Time Pal
4. The Cat Concerto^{3}
5. Dr. Jekyll and Mr. Mouse
6. Salt Water Tabby
7. A Mouse in the House^{4} (blackface gag cut)
8. The Invisible Mouse
9. Kitty Foiled
10. The Truce Hurts^{4} (blackface gag cut)
11. Old Rockin' Chair Tom^{4}
12. Professor Tom
13. Mouse Cleaning (uncut)

=== Side 2 (Volume 4) ===
1. Polka-Dot Puss^{4}
2. The Little Orphan^{34} (blackface gag cut)
3. Hatch Up Your Troubles
4. Heavenly Puss
5. The Cat and the Mermouse
6. Love That Pup
7. Jerry's Diary
8. Tennis Chumps
9. Little Quacker
10. Saturday Evening Puss^{4}
11. Texas Tom
12. Jerry and the Lion
13. Safety Second

== Volume 3 ==
=== Side 1 (Volume 5) ===
1. The Hollywood Bowl
2. The Framed Cat^{4}
3. Cue Ball Cat
4. Casanova Cat (uncut)
5. Jerry and the Goldfish
6. Jerry's Cousin
7. Sleepy-Time Tom^{4}
8. His Mouse Friday^{4} (edited)
9. Slicked-up Pup
10. Nit-Witty Kitty^{4}
11. Cat Napping
12. The Flying Cat
13. The Duck Doctor

=== Side 2 (Volume 6) ===
1. The Two Mouseketeers^{3}
2. Smitten Kitten
3. Triplet Trouble
4. Little Runaway
5. Fit To Be Tied
6. Push-Button Kitty^{4}
7. Cruise Cat
8. The Dog House
9. The Missing Mouse
10. Jerry and Jumbo
11. Johann Mouse^{3}
12. That's My Pup!
13. Just Ducky

== Volume 4 ==
=== Side 1 (Volume 7) ===
1. Two Little Indians
2. Life with Tom^{4} (blackface gag from The Little Orphan's cut)
3. Puppy Tale
4. Posse Cat
5. Hic-cup Pup
6. Little School Mouse
7. Baby Butch
8. Mice Follies
9. Neapolitan Mouse
10. Downhearted Duckling
11. Pet Peeve^{2}
12. Touché, Pussy Cat!^{2}
13. Southbound Duckling^{2}

=== Side 2 (Volume 8) ===
1. Pup on a Picnic
2. Mouse for Sale
3. Designs on Jerry
4. Tom and Chérie^{2}
5. Smarty Cat
6. Pecos Pest
7. That's My Mommy^{2}
8. The Flying Sorceress^{2}
9. The Egg and Jerry
10. Muscle Beach Tom^{2}
11. Down Beat Bear^{2}
12. Blue Cat Blues^{2}
13. Barbecue Brawl^{2}

== Volume 5 ==
=== Side 1 (Volume 9) ===
1. Tops with Pops
2. Timid Tabby^{2}
3. Feedin' the Kiddie^{4}
4. Mucho Mouse^{2}
5. Tom's Photo Finish^{2}
6. Happy Go Ducky^{2}
7. Royal Cat Nap^{2}
8. The Vanishing Duck^{2}
9. Robin Hoodwinked^{2}
10. Tot Watchers^{2}

=== Side 2 (Volume 10) ===
This side contains all 13 of the Gene Deitch shorts.

1. Switchin' Kitten
2. Down and Outing
3. It's Greek to Me-ow!
4. High Steaks
5. Mouse into Space
6. Landing Stripling
7. Calypso Cat
8. Dicky Moe
9. The Tom and Jerry Cartoon Kit
10. Tall in the Trap
11. Sorry Safari
12. Buddies Thicker Than Water
13. Carmen Get It!

== Volume 6 ==
Volume 6 includes the 4:3 versions of the Chuck Jones shorts, as opposed to The Chuck Jones Collection, which crops them to a widescreen format.

=== Disc 1 (Volume 11) ===
1. Pent-House Mouse
2. The Cat Above and the Mouse Below
3. Is There a Doctor in the Mouse?
4. Much Ado About Mousing
5. Snowbody Loves Me
6. The Unshrinkable Jerry Mouse
7. Ah, Sweet Mouse-Story of Life
8. Tom-ic Energy
9. Bad Day at Cat Rock
10. The Brothers Carry-Mouse-Off
11. Haunted Mouse
12. I'm Just Wild About Jerry
13. Of Feline Bondage
14. The Year of the Mouse
15. The Cat's Me-Ouch!
16. Duel Personality
17. Jerry, Jerry, Quite Contrary

=== Disc 2 (Volume 12) ===
1. Jerry-Go-Round
2. Love Me, Love My Mouse
3. Puss 'n' Boats
4. Filet Meow
5. Matinee Mouse
6. The A-Tom-Inable Snowman
7. Catty Cornered
8. Cat and Dupli-cat
9. O-Solar Meow
10. Guided Mouse-ille
11. Rock 'n' Rodent
12. Cannery Rodent
13. The Mouse from H.U.N.G.E.R.
14. Surf-Bored Cat
15. Shutter Bugged Cat
16. Advance and Be Mechanized
17. Purr-Chance to Dream

== Other notes on set ==
Two cartoons, The Million Dollar Cat and Busy Buddies, are not included for unknown reasons. However, they were included in the US version (Spotlight Collection Vol 1 and Vol 3).

== See also ==
- Tom and Jerry Spotlight Collection
