= Tom and Jerry: The Golden Era Anthology =

Home video box set from Warner Archive

- Directed by: William Hanna; Joseph Barbera
- Produced by: Fred Quimby; William Hanna; Joseph Barbera; Rudolf Ising
- Starring: Tom Cat; Jerry Mouse
- Music by: Scott Bradley; Edward Plumb ("The Missing Mouse")
- Distributed by: Warner Bros. Home Entertainment
- Release date: December 2, 2025

Tom and Jerry: The Golden Era Anthology is a five-disc DVD and six-disc Blu-ray set produced by the Warner Archive Collection and Warner Bros. Home Entertainment that collects the entirety of the original 114 theatrical Tom and Jerry cartoon shorts directed by William Hanna and Joseph Barbera and released by Metro-Goldwyn-Mayer from 1940 to 1958.

In contrast to the previous Spotlight Collections and Golden Collections, this set is the first Tom and Jerry collection to present all 114 original shorts in chronological order, uncut, and restored from the best available elements. The set includes Mouse Cleaning and Casanova Cat – their first home release in the United States – as well as His Mouse Friday, which (for the very first time on any home media format) is presented completely uncut.

The set contains all 114 Tom and Jerry cartoons on the first five discs (with 20 audio commentaries), while the Blu-ray version contains an exclusive sixth bonus disc with 3 hours of special features (including two newly released featurettes: Lady of the House: The Story of Mammy Two-Shoes and Animal Hijinks: The Friends and Foes of Tom and Jerry) and a packaged collectible 32-page booklet with artwork and essays.

Tom and Jerry: The Golden Era Anthology was released on December 2, 2025 to commemorate the 85th anniversary of the franchise. It is similar to the Tom and Jerry Spotlight and Golden Collections, two previous DVD series that focused on the Hanna-Barbera era shorts, and supersedes the scrapped Golden Collection series.

== Background ==
In the past, Tom and Jerry has had problematic DVD and Blu-ray releases, mostly because the majority of the film negatives for the original pre-1951 MGM cartoons were destroyed in the George Eastman House fire of 1978, leaving only inferior duplicate copies; original titles were also removed from said negatives.

Between 2004 and 2007, Warner Home Video released three volumes of the Tom and Jerry Spotlight Collection DVD sets, which collected 112 of the original 114 Hanna-Barbera-directed shorts. Two cartoons – Mouse Cleaning and Casanova Cat – were omitted due to brief blackface gags. While some cartoons were restored (including all the CinemaScope cartoons) – the majority of the shorts used unrestored 1990s Turner prints made for TNT and Cartoon Network. Several cartoons on Volumes 1 & 2 contained edits, this was corrected through a disc replacement program, and modern pressings have the shorts unedited. Volume 3 contained an edited copy of His Mouse Friday (which was never corrected), and the CinemaScope cartoon Pup on a Picnic was cropped to the 16:9 TV-filling 1.78:1 aspect ratio.

In 2011, Warner Home Video released the Tom and Jerry Golden Collection: Volume 1 Blu-ray set, which contained the first 37 Tom and Jerry cartoons uncut and in chronological order. This time the 27 cartoons were restored using Color Reversal Intermedites (CRIs), which restulted in more pristine image quality. 10 of these cartoons (Puss N' Toots, The Bowling Alley Cat, Sufferin' Cats!, Lonesome Mouse, The Zoot Cat, The Million Dollar Cat, Puttin' on the Dog, Mouse Trouble, Quiet Please! and The Milky Waif) were sourced from washed out 1960s Metrocolor prints, resulting in an inferior image quality and criticism from fans and collectors.

A second volume of the Golden Collection series was scheduled to be released in June 2013. In February 2013, it was announced that Mouse Cleaning and Casanova Cat would once again not be included. The product received negative reviews on Amazon and various other websites, which eventually led Warner Home Video to cancel Volume 2 and the Golden Collection series. The transfers made for Volume 2 (excluding Mouse Cleaning and Casanova Cat) were eventually made available on the ITunes Store and YouTube Movies. All of these cartoons were presented uncut and all of them were restored from CRIs with two exceptions: Heavenly Puss and Jerry's Diary, which were restored from the 1960s Metrocolor prints.

In February 2025, to coincide with Tom and Jerry's 85th Anniversary, Warner Archive Collection released Tom and Jerry: The Complete CinemaScope Collection, a single-disc Blu-ray set which contained all 23 CinemaScope Tom and Jerry cartoons presented in their correct aspect ratios, including Pup on a Picnic. The set also included three non-Tom and Jerry CinemaScope cartoons by Hanna and Barbera – Good Will to Men (1955), Give and Tyke and Scat Cats (both 1957) – which were included as extras. This set received mostly positive feedback from fans and collectors.

In September 2025, Warner Archive announced Tom and Jerry: The Golden Era Anthology, a multi-disc Blu-ray set collecting the entirety of the original 114 Hanna-Barbera era shorts. Released on December 2, 2025, the set presents all 114 shorts in chronological order and uncut – including Mouse Cleaning and Casanova Cat – as well as (for the first time on any home media format) an unedited version of His Mouse Friday. According to Jerry Beck, Warner Archive President George Feltenstein was finally able to convince the higher-ups at Warner Bros. Home Entertainment to release the two long withheld cartoons by explaining to them that the market for physical media had become increasingly niche and more geared towards adult collectors rather than family audiences.

The set also features brand new transfers of 11 cartoons (including Mouse Cleaning, which was restored from one of the few surviving nitrate negatives), as well as quality improvements made to many others. In addition, 5 out of the 12 cartoons originally restored from the '60s Metrocolor prints (The Bowling Alley-Cat, Sufferin' Cats!, The Zoot Cat, The Million Dollar Cat and Puttin' on the Dog) received new transfers from CRIs resulting in a more pristine, if still inferior, image quality. The remaining 103 cartoons were the same high-definition transfers made for the Golden Collection and CinemaScope Collection Blu-rays as well as HBO Max and MeTV. This includes the remaining 7 cartoons (Puss n' Toots, The Lonesome Mouse, Mouse Trouble, Quiet Please!, The Milky Waif, Heavenly Puss and Jerry's Diary) restored from the inferior Metrocolor prints.

According to Feltenstein, he gave specific instructions to re-restore all 12 of the "Metrocolor" cartoons from CRIs – the mastering team informed him that the CRIs to 7 of them had either been lost or suffered severe damage over the past several decades, and the Metrocolor prints were currently the best surviving source (whereas the older Turner Prints were taken from the CRIs when they were still available). Feltenstein acknowledged: "...there are just a small handful of shorts [on this set] that don’t look as great as I wish they did. But our team did the best that we could with the best elements we have…"

The set included two featurettes, originally created for the cancelled Tom and Jerry Golden Collection Blu-rays, but only released with this set: Lady of the House: The Story of Mammy Two-Shoes and Animal Hijinks: The Friends and Foes of Tom and Jerry (originally scheduled for Volume 2). The majority of the extras from the previous Spotlight, Golden and CinemaScope collections were carried over to this release, including 20 audio commentaries (6 of which were made for the aborted Golden Collection: Vol. 2 and finally released on this set).

== Contents ==
The set was released on December 2, 2025 in the US. All of the shorts are shown in their original aspect ratios.

An Spade (♠) indicates that the cartoon is restored from a washed-out Metrocolor print.

Two asterisks (**) indicates that the cartoon is re-restored using new transfers.

=== Disc 1 ===
1. Puss Gets the Boot (1940)
2. The Midnight Snack (1941)
3. The Night Before Christmas (1941)
4. Fraidy Cat (1942)
5. Dog Trouble (1942)
6. Puss n' Toots♠ (1942)
7. The Bowling Alley-Cat** (1942)
8. Fine Feathered Friend (1942)
9. Sufferin' Cats!** (1943)
10. The Lonesome Mouse♠ (1943)
11. The Yankee Doodle Mouse** (1943)
12. Baby Puss (1943)
13. The Zoot Cat** (1944)
14. The Million Dollar Cat** (1944)
15. The Bodyguard (1944)
16. Puttin' on the Dog** (1944)
17. Mouse Trouble♠ (1944)
18. The Mouse Comes to Dinner (1945)
19. Mouse in Manhattan (1945)
20. Tee for Two (1945)
21. Flirty Birdy (1945)
22. Quiet Please!♠ (1945)

==== Commentaries ====
- Mark Kausler on Puss Gets the Boot
- Earl Kress and Nichole Parker on Puss Gets the Boot
- Michael Mallory on The Night Before Christmas
- Earl Kress and Nichole Parker on The Night Before Christmas
- Michael Mallory on The Yankee Doodle Mouse
- Jerry Beck on The Zoot Cat
- Michael Mallory on Mouse Trouble
- Mark Kausler on Quiet Please!

=== Disc 2 ===
1. Springtime for Thomas (1946)
2. The Milky Waif♠ (1946)
3. Trap Happy (1946)
4. Solid Serenade (1946)
5. Cat Fishin' (1947)
6. Part Time Pal (1947)
7. The Cat Concerto (1947)
8. Dr. Jekyll and Mr. Mouse (1947)
9. Salt Water Tabby (1947)
10. A Mouse in the House (1947)
11. The Invisible Mouse (1947)
12. Kitty Foiled (1948)
13. The Truce Hurts (1948)
14. Old Rockin' Chair Tom (1948)
15. Professor Tom (1948)
16. Mouse Cleaning (1948)
17. Polka-Dot Puss (1949)
18. The Little Orphan (1949)
19. Hatch Up Your Troubles** (1949)
20. Heavenly Puss♠ (1949)
21. The Cat and the Mermouse (1949)
22. Love That Pup (1949)
23. Jerry's Diary♠ (1949)
24. Tennis Chumps (1949)

==== Commentaries ====
- Eric Goldberg on The Cat Concerto
- Michael Mallory on Dr. Jekyll and Mr. Mouse
- Earl Kress and Nichole Parker on Dr. Jekyll and Mr. Mouse
- Jerry Beck on Kitty Foiled
- Michael Mallory on The Little Orphan
- Michael Mallory on Hatch Up Your Troubles
- Jerry Beck on Heavenly Puss

=== Disc 3 ===
1. Little Quacker (1950)
2. Saturday Evening Puss (1950)
3. Texas Tom (1950)
4. Jerry and the Lion (1950)
5. Safety Second (1950)
6. The Hollywood Bowl (1950)
7. The Framed Cat (1950)
8. Cue Ball Cat (1950)
9. Casanova Cat (1951)
10. Jerry and the Goldfish (1951)
11. Jerry's Cousin (1951)
12. Sleepy-Time Tom (1951)
13. His Mouse Friday (1951)
14. Slicked-up Pup (1951)
15. Nit-Witty Kitty (1951)
16. Cat Napping (1951)
17. The Flying Cat (1952)
18. The Duck Doctor (1952)
19. The Two Mouseketeers (1952)
20. Smitten Kitten (1952)
21. Triplet Trouble (1952)
22. Little Runaway (1952)
23. Fit to Be Tied** (1952)
24. Push-Button Kitty (1952)
25. Cruise Cat (1952)
26. The Dog House (1952)

==== Commentaries ====
- Earl Kress and Nichole Parker on Saturday Evening Puss
- Jerry Beck on Jerry's Cousin
- Jerry Beck on The Two Mouseketeers
- Mark Kausler on Push-Button Kitty

=== Disc 4 ===
1. The Missing Mouse (1953)
2. Jerry and Jumbo** (1953)
3. Johann Mouse (1953)
4. That's My Pup! (1953)
5. Just Ducky (1953)
6. Two Little Indians (1953)
7. Life with Tom (1953)
8. Puppy Tale (1954)
9. Posse Cat (1954)
10. Hic-cup Pup (1954)
11. Little School Mouse (1954)
12. Baby Butch (1954)
13. Mice Follies (1954)
14. Neapolitan Mouse (1954)
15. Downhearted Duckling (1954)
16. Pet Peeve$ (1954)
17. Touché, Pussy Cat!$ (1954)
18. Southbound Duckling$ (1955)
19. Pup on a Picnic$ (1955)
20. Mouse for Sale (1955)
21. Designs on Jerry (1955)
22. Tom and Chérie$ (1955)
23. Smarty Cat (1955)
24. Pecos Pest (1955)
25. That's My Mommy$ (1955)

$ in Cinemascope

==== Commentaries ====
- Mark Kausler on Johann Mouse

=== Disc 5 ===
(All shorts on disc in Cinemascope)

1. The Flying Sorceress (1956)
2. The Egg and Jerry (1956)
3. Busy Buddies (1956)
4. Muscle Beach Tom (1956)
5. Down Beat Bear (1956)
6. Blue Cat Blues (1956)
7. Barbecue Brawl (1956)
8. Tops with Pops (1957)
9. Timid Tabby (1957)
10. Feedin' the Kiddie (1957)
11. Mucho Mouse (1957)
12. Tom's Photo Finish (1957)
13. Happy Go Ducky (1958)
14. Royal Cat Nap (1958)
15. The Vanishing Duck (1958)
16. Robin Hoodwinked (1958)
17. Tot Watchers (1958)

=== Disc 6: Special Features ===
- Lady of the House: The Story of Mammy Two-Shoes (NEW!)
- Animal Hijinks: The Friends and Foes of Tom and Jerry (originally planned for Golden Collection Vol. 2)
- The Midnight Snack Pencil Test – Side by Side
- Cat and Mouse: The Tale of Tom and Jerry
- Tom and Jerry: Behind the Tunes
- Animators as Actors
- 1953 Excerpt from Dangerous When Wet (provided in HD)
- How Bill and Joe Met Tom and Jerry
- Vaudeville, Slapstick and Tom and Jerry
- The Comedy Stylings of Tom and Jerry
- The Worry Song from Anchors Aweigh (provided in HD)
- 3 Bonus Cartoons (taken from The Complete CinemaScope Collection)
  - Good Will to Men (1955)
  - Give and Tyke (1957)
  - Scat Cats (1957)

== Reception ==
Tom and Jerry: The Golden Era Anthology received a positive reception from fans and collectors.

Film preservationist and animation historian, Thad Komorowski, wrote a lukewarm review of the set, writing "...the picture and audio ranges from excellent to serviceable on most titles (the newly unleashed Mouse Cleaning in particular looks fantastic)..." He criticized the seven cartoons still sourced from 1960s Metrocolor prints, which he described as "[looking] as rotten as ever here, though technicians tried to 'hide it' by getting rid of the '60s MGM lion, as if no one could tell the difference by what the actual cartoon looks like... (In Lonesome Mouse's case, they forgot and left the '60s lion on!)..." In particular, he criticized the transfer on Heavenly Puss, describing it as: "...the biggest disappointment of the whole set, an utter embarrassment that all but obliterates any of this unique cartoon's detail and art direction." He also criticized the color grading on the cartoons originally restored for the Golden Collection Vol. 2 set, saying "[the colors were] just too crushed and dark... They're acceptable and better than not having them in HD, but it would have been nice to see these get some reworking (with actual whites) done, if not a complete reprieve. (Fit to Be Tied and Jerry and Jumbo are two that got new restorations, and they show what all of these cartoons should look like.)" Still, he ultimately recommended the set, saying "... there has never been any kind of comprehensive home video collection [of Tom and Jerry] where errors didn't get through... By far: this is the best comprehensive presentation Tom & Jerry has ever received on home video. It took over thirty years to improve upon the scope of the Beck/Feltenstein Art of Tom & Jerry LaserDisc collections, and to upgrade the middling jobs previously done on DVD and Blu-ray. We all expected most of these would end up on Blu-ray, never all of them with how much the characters remain an evergreen kids and family property. Everyone involved clearly went the extra mile with next to no time to do it, and we've all been rewarded with an unprecedented complete and uncensored collection."

== See also ==
- Tom and Jerry: The Classic Collection
- Tom and Jerry Spotlight Collection
- Tom and Jerry: The Chuck Jones Collection
- Tom and Jerry Golden Collection
- Tom and Jerry: The Gene Deitch Collection
