= Casanova Cat =

1951 animated short film directed by William Hanna and Joseph Barbera

- Reissue title card
- Directed by: William Hanna; Joseph Barbera
- Story by: William Hanna; Joseph Barbera (both uncredited)
- Produced by: Fred Quimby
- Starring: William Hanna; Jerry Mann (both uncredited)
- Music by: Scott Bradley
- Animation by: Irven Spence; Ray Patterson; Ed Barge; Kenneth Muse
- Layouts by: Richard Bickenbach (uncredited)
- Color process: Technicolor; Perspecta (1958 reissue)
- Production company: MGM Cartoons
- Distributed by: Metro-Goldwyn-Mayer
- Release dates: January 6, 1951 (U.S. original issue); March 8, 1958 (U.S. reissue)
- Running time: 6:49

Casanova Cat is a 1951 one-reel animated cartoon and is the 55th Tom and Jerry short directed by William Hanna and Joseph Barbera and produced by Fred Quimby.

== Plot ==
Tom heads to Toodles' home to woo her with flowers upon learning that she has recently inherited $1,000,000, dragging Jerry, tied to a bow, with him. Once inside, Tom winds Jerry into a doll and forces him to roll on a ball, impressing Toodles. Tom then blackens Jerry's face with cigar smoke and blowing it. He forces Jerry to tap-dance by lighting up a metal plate. Tom then gives Jerry as a present to Toodles, but asks for a kiss in return. Just as Tom and Toodles are about to kiss, Jerry jams Tom's tail into an automatic ashtray, causing Tom to scream in Toodles' face.

Jerry escapes to the window ledge and spots Butch singing a couple of lines from "Over the Rainbow" (his singing was provided by Jerry Mann) in a nearby alley and launches the newspaper headline towards Butch. Tom and Butch proceed to fight each other to win Toodles' heart, while Toodles, sitting on the couch, watches them. Butch slaps Tom (because he slapped him with his glove) into a fishbowl, but Tom ties Butch's tail to a pole. Toodles then tosses sweets into Tom's mouth, but Butch drops a bowling ball into Tom. Butch kisses Toodles' arm, but Tom places a mousetrap onto her arm to trap Butch's kissing mouth. Tom then traps Butch between two doors and kisses Toodles' cheek. Butch then grabs Toodles and goes to kiss her, but Tom also turns around to also kiss Toodles, but the two kiss each other instead and Tom turns around and attacks Butch in the face.

Jerry then kisses Toodles on the cheek, causing her to take an interest in Jerry. Tom and Butch chase Jerry, but Jerry hides in a vent, ties Butch and Tom's tails into a knot, and pull their tails to make them pull each other into the wall repeatedly. Butch then runs forward, squeezing Tom through the vent. Tom then pops out of the vent as a cube and bangs into Butch. Then they untangle themselves. Afterwards, they looked on the couch for Toodles and search for her. However, they then hear a noise outside. Both cats ran to the window to look at what is happening and see a car leaving. Toodles and Jerry are in the back seat, then after Jerry has put down the shade in the car, he and Toodles share a love-kiss.

== Voice cast ==
- Jerry Mann as Butch singing Over the Rainbow (uncredited)
- William Hanna as Tom screaming (uncredited, archival audio)

== Production ==
- Directed by William Hanna and Joseph Barbera
- Animation: Irven Spence, Ray Patterson, Ed Barge, Kenneth Muse
- Story: William Hanna and Joseph Barbera
- Layout: Richard Bickenbach
- Music: Scott Bradley
- Produced by: Fred Quimby

== Availability ==
=== VHS ===
- Tom and Jerry's Cartoon Cavalcade (uncensored)

=== DVD ===
- Tom and Jerry: The Classic Collection (Region 2 DVD, uncensored)
- This cartoon was omitted from the Spotlight Collection, Volume 3 DVD release in 2007. It had been announced that Casanova Cat would be available on the Tom and Jerry Golden Collection – Volume 2 on DVD and Blu-ray, with the short being presented uncut, uncensored, and restored. However, on February 6, 2013, it was announced by TVShowsOnDVD.com that Casanova Cat was not part of the list of cartoons on this release, as well as the cartoon Mouse Cleaning, which was also skipped over on the Spotlight Collection, Volume 3 DVD release. Furthermore, the Golden Collection series was cancelled following a negative reception.
- Tom and Jerry: The Golden Era Anthology (1940–1958) (Region 1 DVD, uncensored)

=== Blu-ray ===
- Tom and Jerry: The Golden Era Anthology (1940–1958) (Region A/1 Blu-ray, uncensored)

== Censorship and bans ==
Because of the cartoon involving Jerry's blackface dance scene from Tom's cigar smoke on a hot plate, this short like Mouse Cleaning was banned from being released on DVD in the United States by Warner Home Video, as well as the Tom and Jerry Golden Collection – Volume 2, this short was not aired on Cartoon Network or Boomerang because of racial stereotyping of African Americans. The episode did, however, air on May 1, 2021 on MeTV with the censored Turner print, cutting out the blackface.

On September 9, 2025, it was announced that the Tom and Jerry: The Golden Era Anthology (1940–1958) Blu-ray/DVD set, which was released on December 2, 2025, would feature all 114 of the original Hanna-Barbera shorts uncut and uncensored, including the two aforementioned banned shorts as well as His Mouse Friday, marking the former two's first official release on a physical format in North America.
