= The Hollywood Bowl (film) =

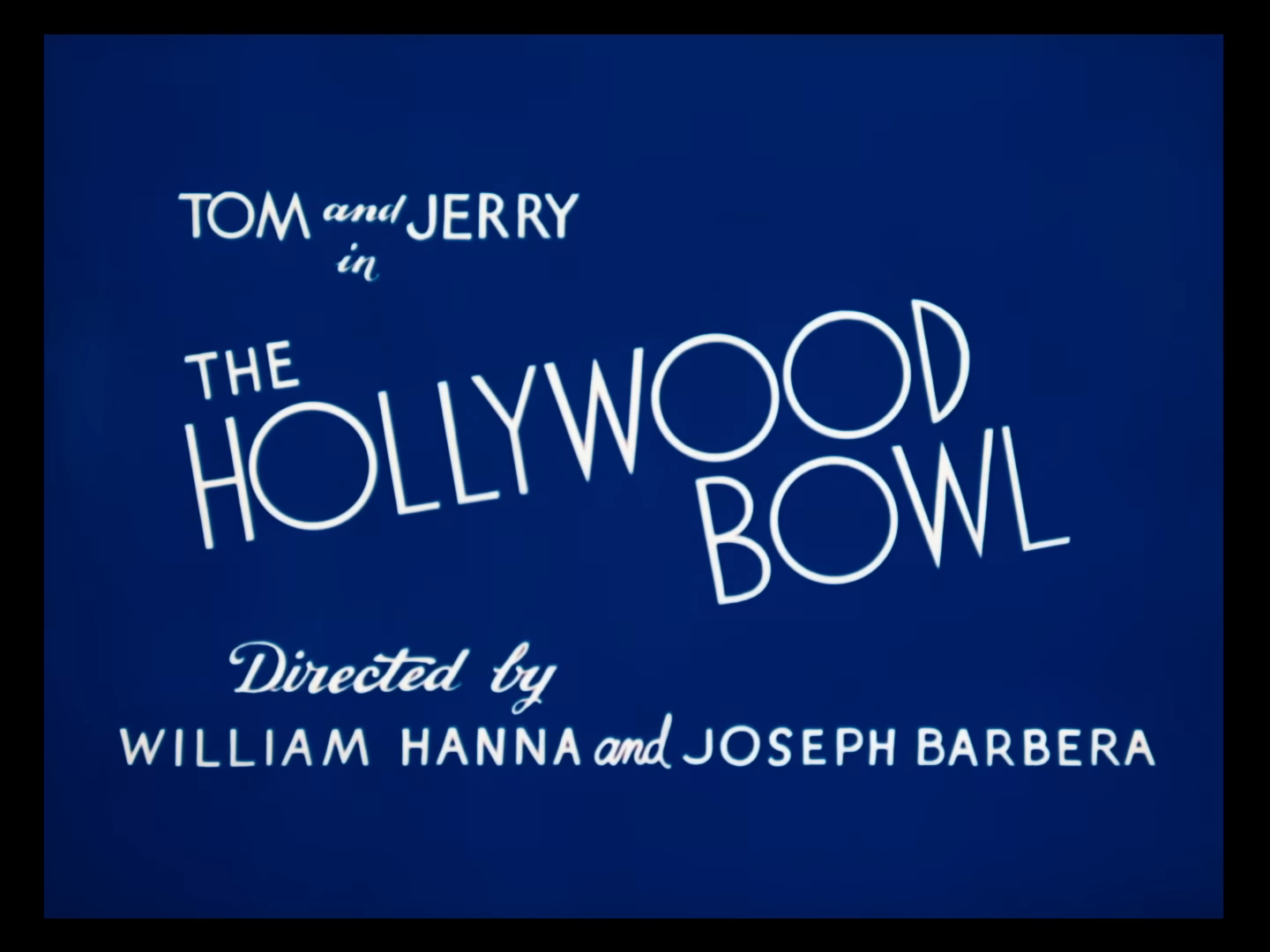
- Directed by: William Hanna; Joseph Barbera
- Story by: William Hanna; Joseph Barbera (both uncredited)
- Produced by: Fred Quimby
- Cinematography: Jack Stevens (uncredited)
- Edited by: Jim Faris (uncredited)
- Music by: Musical direction: Scott Bradley
- Animation by: Kenneth Muse; Irven Spence; Ray Patterson; Ed Barge
- Layouts by: Richard Bickenbach (uncredited)
- Backgrounds by: Robert Gentle (uncredited)
- Color process: Technicolor
- Production company: MGM Cartoons
- Distributed by: Metro-Goldwyn-Mayer
- Release date: September 16, 1950
- Running time: 7:22
- Country: United States

The Hollywood Bowl (also known as Tom and Jerry in the Hollywood Bowl) is a 1950 American one-reel animated cartoon and is the 52nd Tom and Jerry short directed by William Hanna and Joseph Barbera and produced by Fred Quimby. The cartoon, as the title suggests, is set at the Hollywood Bowl in California, where Tom is conducting a large orchestra.

The cartoon was animated by Kenneth Muse, Irven Spence, Ray Patterson and Ed Barge. It was released to theaters on September 16, 1950, and reissued in Perspecta sound on December 20, 1957.

The music was scored by Scott Bradley, making use of Johann Strauss II's overture of his 1874 operetta Die Fledermaus, with intro and outro making use of Franz Liszt's 1854 symphonic poem, Les préludes.

== Plot ==
Tom walks onto the stage, ready to conduct a cat orchestra to the overture to "Die Fledermaus". Jerry emerges from his mouse hole and rushes to the podium to try to take over from Tom. Tom tries to whack Jerry with his baton, but Jerry continues to conduct the music from Tom's baton. Tom then stuffs Jerry into his suit, but Jerry pops out from Tom's sleeves. After Jerry pops out of Tom's dickey, Tom stretches Jerry on his baton and catapults him onto a harp. Jerry then offers to dance the Du und du with Tom. After they dance together, Jerry sends Tom spinning into a cello, where he is "strung" by the cello player. Tom then gets his revenge and tricks Jerry into dancing with him before walloping Jerry and hurling him into a sousaphone, where he is "squirted" by the sousaphone player.

Tom and Jerry continue to try to one-up the other and win the right to conduct the orchestra. When Jerry pleads Tom to let him conduct the orchestra, Tom uses his baton as a snooker cue to knock Jerry off the podium before using Jerry's baton as a toothpick and throwing it away. Jerry retaliates by snapping Tom's baton in half, only for Tom to produce a spare baton from his pocket and stick his tongue at Jerry. Jerry, fed up, uses a hammer to put nails into some wheels onto the podium and pushes it (with Tom still on it) out of the amphitheater and onto the road, where an unaware Tom is flattened by a passing bus.

Tom, returning with his tailcoat ripped and his eyes blackened, grabs Jerry and dangles him between two cymbals, which are bashed together, flattening Jerry and killing him. Jerry's flattened ghost floats down to the floor before reviving and popping back to his full size and structure. Enraged and deciding to sabotage the concert, Jerry grabs a saw and saws underneath the floor of the entire orchestra, causing the feline members of the orchestra to fall and disappear under the floor. Tom is left aimlessly running around to play the instruments until Jerry finishes conducting the symphony. As expected, Jerry takes all applause and credit for himself, and then points to the "One-man orchestra" Tom, who is now exhausted. Then Tom manages to stand up and nod to the crowd before he also falls off through the floor like the feline orchestra.

== Production ==
- Directed by William Hanna and Joseph Barbera
- Story: William Hanna and Joseph Barbera
- Animation: Kenneth Muse, Irven Spence, Ray Patterson and Ed Barge
- Layout: Richard Bickenbach
- Backgrounds: Robert Gentle
- Camera Operator: Jack Stevens
- Film Editor: Jim Faris
- Voice Characterizations: William Hanna
- Music: Scott Bradley
- Produced by: Fred Quimby

== Availability ==
=== VHS ===
- Tom & Jerry Cartoon Festival Volume 3 (1983)

=== LaserDisc ===
- The Art of Tom & Jerry: Volume I, Side 7 (1993)

=== DVD ===
- Tom and Jerry: The Classic Collection Volume 3, Side 1 (2004)
- Tom and Jerry Spotlight Collection Volume 1, Disc 2 (2004)
- Tom and Jerry: The Golden Era Anthology, Disc 3 (2025)

=== Blu-ray ===
- Tom and Jerry: The Golden Era Anthology, Disc 3 (2025)
