= The Lonesome Mouse =

- Theatrical poster
- Directed by: William Hanna; Joseph Barbera
- Story by: William Hanna; Joseph Barbera; (both uncredited)
- Produced by: Fred Quimby
- Starring: Lillian Randolph; Harry E. Lang; William Hanna; (all uncredited)
- Cinematography: Gene Moore (uncredited)
- Edited by: Fred McAlpin (uncredited)
- Music by: Scott Bradley
- Animation by: Al Grandmain; Irven Spence; Pete Burness; Kenneth Muse; George Gordon; Jack Zander
- Layouts by: Harvey Eisenberg (uncredited)
- Production company: MGM Cartoons
- Distributed by: Metro-Goldwyn-Mayer
- Release date: May 22, 1943
- Running time: 8 minutes
- Country: United States
- Language: English

The Lonesome Mouse is a 1943 American animated short film and the tenth Tom and Jerry short directed by William Hanna and Joseph Barbera, and produced by Fred Quimby. It contains the first speaking role of the cat and mouse duo, and the only one with significant dialogue between the two main characters. Both Tom and Jerry were voiced by Harry E. Lang. It was created and released in 1943, and re-released to theatres on November 5, 1949.

== Plot ==
Tom is sleeping by the fireplace, but Jerry drops a vase onto his head, framing Tom and causing Mammy Two-Shoes to throw Tom out of the house. Jerry teases Tom from inside, and spends the whole day having lots of fun with Tom's stuff, but at the end of the day, he soon becomes lonely without the cat. Watching Tom from the window, Jerry's conscience convinces him that he could get Tom back in the house if he wanted to. Jerry runs outside and makes a deal with Tom in a whisper to get him back in the house,

In the kitchen, Mammy is cooking some dinner, before Jerry comes in and snaps Mammy's sock, before shaking a terrified Mammy on a stool. Jerry then cuts a leg off the stool, and Mammy falls with a big crash, calling for Tom to save her. Tom and Jerry play patty-cake behind a curtain, mimicking fighting sounds, before Jerry turns on the cooker, which Mammy is cowering on. Tom rips a drumstick from a cooked chicken, and shares it with Jerry behind a wall. Tom then chases Jerry into a cupboard, where the mouse pretends to choke Tom before they use the pots and pans as a drum set.

The two then exit the cupboard, staging a fight with a knife and fork, and poke Mammy several times. Tom then grabs a meat cleaver and chops a table leg, a curtain, a table in half, and an apple on top of Jerry's head in half. Jerry notices that last one was a close shave, and as Tom chases after him, he asks, "Hey, we're still kiddin', ain't we?" Tom assures him that they are, then chases Jerry around Mammy, who clumsily hits the cat three times with a broom, aiming for the mouse, before Tom snaps it in half. Jerry then runs under the carpet, with Mammy in pursuit, before he escapes and Tom puts a tomato down in his place. Mammy hits the tomato and Tom feigns mourning, laying down flowers.

Later, Tom receives a reward for taking care of Jerry, a lemon meringue pie. Jerry starts to eat it, but Tom refuses to share it with him, causing Jerry to angrily kick the selfish Tom's face into the pie. Jerry walks off mumbling angrily to himself, "Why, that dirty double crossin', good for nothin', two-timin'..." and the cartoon ends.

== Voice cast ==
Note: All voice actors are uncredited

- Harry E. Lang as Tom and Jerry (both speaking voices and vocal effects) / Jerry's Inner Conscience
- Lillian Randolph as Mammy Two-Shoes (original)
  - Thea Vidale as Mammy Two-Shoes (redubbed)

== Controversy ==
The Lonesome Mouse has drawn attention for a brief wartime visual gag referencing Adolf Hitler. In one scene, Jerry uses a burnt match to alter a picture of Tom so that the cat’s face resembles Hitler, complete with hair and a small mustache, and then spits on the image. The gag reflects the cartoon’s 1943 production context during World War II and aligns with contemporary anti-Nazi sentiment.

In later decades, the scene became the subject of broadcast edits and censorship. When the short aired on American television networks such as Cartoon Network and Boomerang, the Hitler-referencing shot was often removed from the broadcast version due to concerns about its potentially offensive or insensitive depiction, even though it was intended as mockery of a widely condemned historical figure.

Because of this and other sensitive material, including racial stereotypes associated with the character Mammy Two-Shoes, The Lonesome Mouse is among the Tom and Jerry shorts that are rarely shown unedited in modern television rotation.

== Availability ==
=== LaserDisc ===
- The Art of Tom & Jerry: Volume I, Side 2 (1993)

=== DVD ===
- Tom and Jerry Spotlight Collection Volume 2, Disc 1 (2005)
- Tom and Jerry: The Deluxe Anniversary Collection, Disc 1 (2010)
- Tom and Jerry Golden Collection Volume 1, Disc 1 (2011)
- Tom and Jerry: The Golden Era Anthology, Disc 1 (2025)

=== Blu-ray ===
- Tom and Jerry Golden Collection Volume 1, Disc 1 (2011)
- Tom and Jerry: The Golden Era Anthology, Disc 1 (2025)

== See also ==
- Song of the South
