= Solid Serenade =

1946 animated short film directed by William Hanna & Joseph Barbera

- Re-release title card of Solid Serenade.
- Directed by: William Hanna; Joseph Barbera
- Story by: William Hanna; Joseph Barbera
- Produced by: Fred Quimby
- Starring: William Hanna; Ira "Buck" Woods; Earl Keen; Harry E. Lang; Jerry Mann; Billy Bletcher
- Music by: Scott Bradley
- Animation by: Ed Barge; Michael Lah; Kenneth Muse; Ray Patterson (uncredited); Pete Burness (uncredited)
- Color process: Technicolor
- Production company: MGM Cartoons
- Distributed by: Metro-Goldwyn-Mayer
- Release date: August 31, 1946
- Running time: 7:22
- Language: English

Solid Serenade is a 1946 animated cartoon and is the 26th Tom and Jerry short, produced in Technicolor and released to theatres on August 31, 1946 by Metro-Goldwyn Mayer. It was produced by Fred Quimby, directed by William Hanna and Joseph Barbera, and the musical supervision was by Scott Bradley. Ed Barge, Michael Lah, and Kenneth Muse animated it. Excerpts of this cartoon are seen in three other Tom and Jerry shorts: Jerry's Diary, Smitten Kitten, and Smarty Cat, the latter instance with altered audio and an added scene of Tom whistling.

== Plot ==
In a backyard is a doghouse labeled "Killer" with the dog (Spike) inside. Tom pokes his head over the wall and spots Toodles in the window. Tom has brought a string instrument (which appears to be a hybrid of a double bass and a cello). He leaps over the fence and neutralizes Spike by whistling at him and hitting him on the head with a mallet and tying him up. Tom then uses the cello like a pogo stick to jump his way over to the window, stopping to flick Spike's nose along the way.

Tom performs "Is You Is or Is You Ain't My Baby" to Toodles, which wakes Jerry, who was sleeping inside his mousehole (located in a mail box). Annoyed by the sounds, he pokes out of the mail slot and spots Tom playing the instrument. He goes back to his bed and covers himself with the pillow, however the sound waves from the instrument shake Jerry's mousehole, causing Jerry to fall out of bed (while still trying to cover his ears) and vibrate his way under a table, meanwhile a flower pot is vibrated across the table directly above Jerry's head and falls on him when both reach the edge of the table. Outside, Tom uses the instrument as a bow to shoot himself to Spike, who is still tied up, tortures the dog by plucking its mouth, and runs back to the string instrument. The camera goes back inside Jerry's mousehole, whose stuff is messed up and broken by the vibration. Jerry continues being moved to under the mail hole's lid right before a match holding it falls, making the lid slam Jerry. Having had enough, Jerry throws off his nightcap, goes out of the mousehole to the kitchen and decides to get revenge by stuffing an iron into a pie which he then hurls at Tom through an open window; the cat is angered, but continues with a few more bars. Seconds later, he is hit in the face again – this time with a pie covered in whipped cream. Spotting Jerry, Tom chases him through the house.

Both animals dive off an ironing board; with Jerry ahead of Tom, Jerry drains the kitchen sink he landed in, leaving Tom to crash into the crockery. Tom follows Jerry through the open window, but Jerry pulls the window stop out of the window, which falls on Tom's neck, and Tom shrieks in pain. Jerry then runs out and unties Spike, who lets out a loud bull roar. Spike swaps his regular teeth for larger ones, blows off some pent-up steam, and goes after Tom.

Tom ducks as Spike's teeth come at him, which instead get lodged in a tree trunk. Tom then barely avoids getting his tail bitten and hides behind a wall, holding a brick up ready to attack. Spike sees the brick and investigates, but gets knocked on the head with it. Jerry revives Spike by hitting him with a wooden plank on his rear end. After slamming Spike, Spike leaps high in the air screaming in pain just as Jerry hands off the board to Tom, framing the cat.

Knowing he is in trouble, Tom tricks Spike into believing the board is a stick by playing "fetch". Spike obliges and fetches but then realizes he's been tricked. Tom and Spike then begin a back and forth chase with Toodles Galore watching on. Tom stops periodically to kiss the cat. Catching on to this habit, Spike blocks Tom from kissing Toodles on the third pass. Tom does not realize he is being tricked and woos Spike in a Charles Boyer voice, thinking it's Toodles (through archive lines from The Zoot Cat), but stops his speech abruptly when he sees the female cat dumbstruck. Realizing his mistake, he slams Spike's head onto the ground.

Tom hides from Spike's rampage until Jerry walks around the corner; he chases Jerry into Spike's house, closing the door with a maniacal laugh and Dracula leer. A second later, the door opens and Jerry emerges with Spike helping him out of the doghouse, Spike then does exactly the same Tom did as he withdraws inside. The entire dog house thrashes about as Spike beats up Tom, who attempts to flee only to be snatched by Spike. Tom manages to write his last will before he's wrenched back in and beaten to within an inch of his life. In the end, Tom becomes part of his instrument in place of the strings with Spike strumming the cat's tail while Jerry bows a dramatic ostinato on Tom's whiskers and Toodles watches.

== Voice cast ==
- Ira "Buck" Woods as Tom singing Is You Is Or Is You Ain't My Baby
  - Harry E. Lang as Tom's vocal effects and speaking voice (one line: "Come on boy! Go get it! Come on!")
  - Jerry Mann as Tom impersonating Charles Boyer (archival recording from The Zoot Cat)
- Earl Keen as Killer's (Spike's) barking effects
- Billy Bletcher as both Tom and Spike's evil laugh (archival recording from Who Killed Who?)

== Production ==
- Directed by: William Hanna and Joseph Barbera
- Story: William Hanna, Joseph Barbera
- Animation: Ed Barge, Michael Lah, Kenneth Muse, Ray Patterson, Pete Burness
- Music: Scott Bradley
- Co-Producer: William Hanna
- Produced by: Fred Quimby

== Availability ==
The short was included on several DVDs and one Blu-ray: Tom and Jerry's Greatest Chases, Vol. 1; Tom and Jerry Spotlight Collection Vol. 1, Disc One; Tom and Jerry Golden Collection Volume One, Disc Two; and Tom and Jerry: The Golden Era Anthology.

== Reception ==
Animation historian Michael Barrier wrote that Tom's appearance stabilized by the time of Solid Serenade, giving him a more streamlined and less inconsistent look. Jerry, whose appearance was already economical, only became cuter, according to Barrier. Describing music director Scott Bradley's work, academic Daniel Ira Goldmark called Solid Serenade "an excellent overview of Bradley's techniques", as it uses both popular songs and an original score.
