= Mammy Two Shoes =

Character in the Tom and Jerry series

- Tom and Jerry (MGM) character
- Mammy Two Shoes in a scene from the Tom & Jerry short Saturday Evening Puss. This is the only time her facial features are clearly seen, although for only a few frames.
- First appearance: Puss Gets the Boot (1940)
- Last appearance: Push-Button Kitty (1952)
- Created by: William Hanna; Joseph Barbera
- Voiced by: Lillian Randolph (original); Anita Brown (The Mouse Comes to Dinner); June Foray (1960s redubbed shorts); Thea Vidale (1990s redubbed shorts)

In-universe information
- Nicknames: Dinah (1940s Tom and Jerry comics)
- Family: Tom (pet)

"Mammy Two Shoes" is the name commonly attributed to a fictional character in Metro-Goldwyn-Mayer's Tom and Jerry cartoons. She is a middle-aged African-American woman based on the mammy stereotype who serves as Tom's owner.

As a partially-seen character, her head was rarely seen, except in a few cartoons including Part Time Pal (1947), A Mouse in the House (1947), Mouse Cleaning (1948), and Saturday Evening Puss (1950).

Mammy appeared in 19 cartoons, from Puss Gets the Boot (1940) to Push-Button Kitty (1952). The character was removed from the series after 1953 due to protests from the NAACP. Her appearances have often been edited out, dubbed, or re-animated in later television showings, since the mammy stereotype is now usually considered racist. Her creation points to the ubiquity of stereotype in American popular culture.

== Theatrical Tom and Jerry cartoons ==
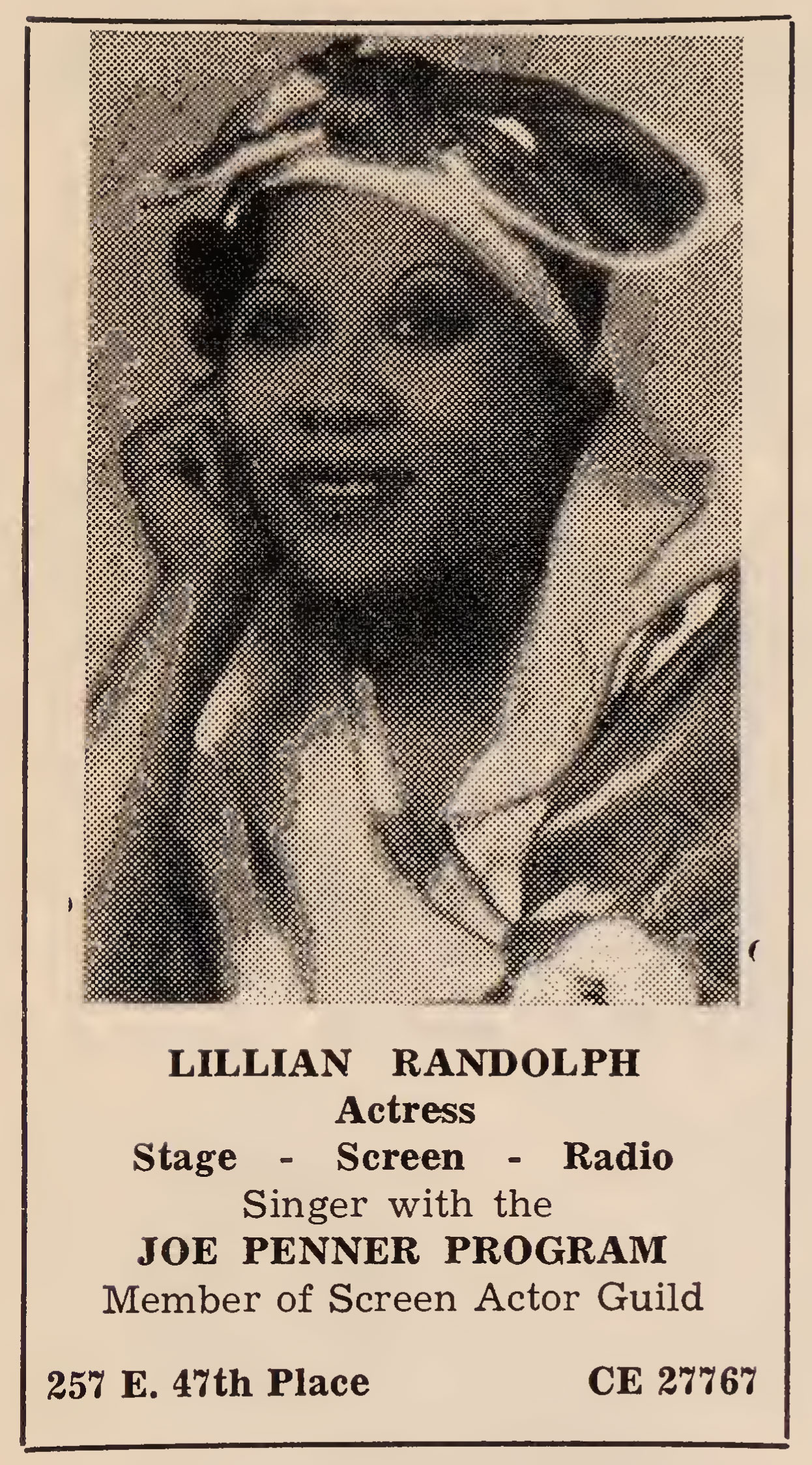
Actress Lillian Randolph in an ad listing from 1939, the year she began voicing the character

The housekeeper's debut appearance was in Puss Gets the Boot (1940), while her last appearance was in Push-Button Kitty (1952). She was originally voiced by well-known African-American character actress Lillian Randolph. She was the second prominent black character of the Metro-Goldwyn-Mayer cartoon department, following Bosko. She appeared in 19 Tom and Jerry animated shorts between 1940 and 1952.

One of her roles in the films was to set up the plot by warning Tom that she will toss him out of the house if he failed to act according to her wishes. She invariably catches Tom acting against her orders, and there are grave consequences. Naturally, it is Jerry who sabotages Tom to get him in trouble. She always called Tom by his full name Thomas (originally Jasper), and frequently used African-American Vernacular English with a Southern accent. Her signature quotes are "Land Sakes!" and "What in the world is going on in here?"—the latter of which is usually delivered upon rushing in to investigate the commotion being caused by Tom and Jerry.

Cultural norms at the time led viewers to believe she was the maid due to her apron and ethnicity. Housing, financial, and residential segregation of Black Americans was the norm before the Civil Rights Act of 1964. Later, through dialogue and occasional behavior, it was suggested that the house was her own. One example is that, because she has her own bedroom in the short Sleepy-Time Tom (1951), it raises the possibility of her being the owner of the house, as no other human is present in the house in shorts where she appears. She refers to it as "my house" in Saturday Evening Puss. Nevertheless, the cutting continuity filed with each short at the Library of Congress always referred to the character as "Maid".

"Mammy Two-Shoes" was never the name of the housekeeper in any of the classic Tom and Jerry cartoons. In a 1975 article in Film Comment, she was incorrectly identified as "Mammy Two-Shoes", a moniker that has been inaccurately attributed to the character ever since. The name "Mammy Two-Shoes" originated on the Disney model sheets for a character in a Silly Symphony cartoon, though the name was never spoken in the cartoon. A similar housekeeper then appeared in MGM Bosko cartoons, also without a name. At no time was the name ever used in any Tom and Jerry cartoon. The author of the 1975 article later apologized, but by then, the incorrect information had become widely accepted, including on the DVD releases of the cartoons. In the script read by Whoopi Goldberg on the Tom and Jerry Spotlight Collection: Vol. 2 DVD set—while explaining the importance of African-American representation in the cartoon series, however stereotyped—the incorrect name is mentioned numerous times.

The housekeeper character was retired from the Tom and Jerry cartoons by William Hanna and Joseph Barbera following several years of protests and condemnations from the NAACP. A 1949 reissue of the 1943 short The Lonesome Mouse prompted the start of the NAACP's campaign against Tom and Jerry. In this short, she is scared by Jerry onto a stool and shakes with fear as a diamond ring, false teeth, a pair of dice, and a straight razor fall from beneath her dress.

In response to the NAACP's campaign and angry about the potential loss of acting roles, Lillian Randolph questioned the authority of then-NAACP president Walter White, stating that the light-complexioned White was "only one-eighth Negro and not qualified to speak for Negroes". When Randolph departed from Tom and Jerry to appear on television, Hanna and Barbera declined to recast the voice role and the character ceased to appear in the cartoons.

== Censorship, discontinuation, and callbacks ==
Rembrandt Films produced 13 Tom and Jerry shorts and they were released from 1961 to 1962. Director Gene Deitch stated in an interview that he opted not to use the character in the 13 shorts, as he felt a "stereotypical black housekeeper" character "didn't work in a modern context".

MGM Animation/Visual Arts, under the supervision of Chuck Jones, created replacement characters for the Tom and Jerry cartoons featuring her for television. These versions used rotoscoping techniques to replace the housekeeper on-screen with a similarly stocky white woman (in most shorts) or a thin white woman (in Saturday Evening Puss); Randolph's voice on the soundtracks was replaced by an Irish-accented (or, in Puss, generic young adult) voice performed by actress June Foray.

After Turner Broadcasting System acquired Tom and Jerry from MGM in 1986, the cartoons featuring this character were edited again. This time, Lillian Randolph's voice was replaced with that of Thea Vidale, who re-recorded the dialogue to remove the stereotype from 1989 to 2001. These re-recorded versions of the cartoons would air on Turner's Cartoon Network–related cable channels, and have at times turned up on DVD as well. However, some European TV showings of these cartoons, especially the UK, as well as the US DVD release of Tom and Jerry Spotlight Collection, Warner Bros. Home Entertainment Academy Awards Animation Collection, and Tom and Jerry: The Deluxe Anniversary Collection and the US DVD and Blu-ray releases of Tom and Jerry Golden Collection and Tom and Jerry: The Golden Era Anthology, retain Randolph's original voice. The Region 2 "Tom and Jerry: The Classic Collection" DVD boxset has Vidale's voice on the first DVD and Randolph in a number of the shorts after that (such as A Mouse in the House and Mouse Cleaning).

A white woman named "Mrs. Two-Shoes" appeared in some episodes of Tom and Jerry Tales, which marks the first time the "Two-Shoes" name was used. She had most aspects of the original character's personality with a similar name.

== Name ==
Within the animated canon of Tom and Jerry, the character is never referred to by any name. In the known written publications of the period by the studio, she is referred to by generic terms such as "the housekeeper" or "the maid". The first known official name given to the character was Dinah, which originated in the comic book series Our Gang Comics.

A very similar character, who was also played by Lillian Randolph, had appeared previously in Disney's Silly Symphony series, most notably Three Orphan Kittens (1935). This is the character that originated the name Mammy Two-Shoes, but only on the model sheets, not in the finished cartoon. In the context of the book, "Mammy Twoshoes" is a nickname playfully given to her by the kittens, due to the fact that her big shoes is what stands out about her in their perspective.

The similarity between the two characters would cause the conflation of their identities. In a 1975 article in Film Comment, animator Mark Kausler referred to the Tom and Jerry character as Mammy Two-Shoes, elaborating that she was "so named because her face was never shown; only shots from the mid-shoulders down". The name would then establish its usage in official material. For example, the 2005 DVD Tom and Jerry Spotlight Collection: Vol. 2 includes an introduction featuring Whoopi Goldberg explaining the racial stereotyping in the cartoons, where she explicitly refers to the character as "Mammy Two Shoes". However, Kausler later recanted and apologized for the error. The article stood unchanged and was used as reference, which was followed by more articles and features with the inaccuracy.

== Featured shorts ==
Title	Released	Lillian Randolph	June Foray	Thea Vidale
Puss Gets the Boot	February 10, 1940	Yes	Yes	Yes
The Midnight Snack	July 19, 1941	Yes		Yes
Fraidy Cat	January 17, 1942	Yes		Yes
Dog Trouble	April 18, 1942	Yes	Yes (recolored)	Yes
Puss n' Toots	May 30, 1942	Yes		Yes
The Lonesome Mouse	May 22, 1943	Yes		Yes
The Mouse Comes to Dinner	May 5, 1945	No (Anita Brown)		Yes
Part Time Pal	March 15, 1947	Yes		Yes
A Mouse in the House	August 30, 1947	Yes		Yes
Old Rockin' Chair Tom	September 18, 1948	Yes	Yes	Yes
Mouse Cleaning	December 11, 1948	Yes		Yes
Polka-Dot Puss	February 26, 1949	Yes		Yes
The Little Orphan	April 30, 1949	No (cameo)		
Saturday Evening Puss	January 14, 1950	Yes	Yes (reanimated)	Yes
The Framed Cat	October 21, 1950	Yes	Yes (reanimated)	Yes
Sleepy-Time Tom	May 26, 1951	Yes		Yes
Nit-Witty Kitty	October 6, 1951	Yes	Yes (recolored)	Yes
Triplet Trouble	May 3, 1952	Yes	Yes (recolored)	Yes
Push-Button Kitty	September 6, 1952	Yes	Yes (recolored)	Yes
