= The Two Mouseketeers =

1952 animated short film by William Hanna and Joseph Barbera

- Theatrical release poster
- Directed by: William Hanna; Joseph Barbera
- Story by: William Hanna; Joseph Barbera (both uncredited)
- Produced by: Fred Quimby
- Starring: William Hanna; Francoise Brun-Cottan; Arthur Q. Bryan; The King's Men (all uncredited)
- Edited by: Jim Faris (uncredited)
- Music by: Scott Bradley
- Animation by: Ed Barge; Kenneth Muse; Irven Spence
- Layouts by: Richard Bickenbach (uncredited)
- Backgrounds by: Robert Gentle (uncredited)
- Color process: Technicolor
- Production company: MGM Cartoons
- Distributed by: Metro-Goldwyn-Mayer
- Release date: January 27, 1952; (earliest known date)
- Running time: 7:26
- Country: United States
- Languages: French; English

The Two Mouseketeers is a 1952 American one-reel animated cartoon and is the 68th Tom and Jerry short, produced in Technicolor and released to theaters as early as January 27, 1952 by Metro-Goldwyn-Mayer. It was produced by Fred Quimby and directed by William Hanna and Joseph Barbera. The short is a spoof of Alexandre Dumas' 1844 novel The Three Musketeers and its film adaptations, featuring the mice Jerry and his best friend, Nibbles as the "Mouseketeers" trying to raid the French king's banquet table, which is protected by Tom as a guard. Three years after the cartoon's release, the term "Mousketeer" was also used to refer to the child cast members of the television show, The Mickey Mouse Club.

The cartoon was animated by Ed Barge, Kenneth Muse, and Irven Spence. Musical supervision was done by Scott Bradley, using a version of the theme music by Nelson Eddy and the Sportsmen Quartet named "Soldier of Fortune", from the film The Girl of the Golden West. The character of Nibbles speaks French in this short and was voiced by six-year-old Francoise Brun-Cottan.

The Two Mouseketeers won the series' sixth Oscar for Best Animated Short Film. Such was the cartoon's success, that Hanna and Barbera created a total of four adventures in the Mouseketeers series; the second, 1954's Touché, Pussy Cat! received an Oscar nomination. The third, Tom and Chérie, followed in 1955, and Royal Cat Nap in 1958. The premise was also featured in comic books from Dell Comics.

== Plot ==
In 17th century Paris, Mouseketeers Jerry and Nibbles decide to help themselves to a lavish royal banquet. Tom, in the service of Captaine Rochefort, has been ordered to guard the spread from the King's Mouseketeers with his life, under threat of execution by guillotine if he fails.

Jerry and Nibbles enter the castle and infiltrate the banquet hall. While helping themselves to the food, they unwittingly catch Tom's attention by accidentally showering him with champagne. After hiding from Tom by disguising themselves as parts of the table decorations, Jerry decides to retreat, but Nibbles begins making a ham sandwich while singing "Alouette" to himself. Tom sneaks up on Nibbles and captures him by putting his rapier through Nibbles's tabard. Jerry stabs Tom in the rear end to rescue Nibbles and throws a custard in Tom's face for good measure. A swordfight ensues, ending with Tom catching Jerry. Nibbles tips a halberd toward Tom, which shaves the tabard and all the fur off the cat's backside.

Nibbles runs away, but is sent flying by Tom into a full wine glass. Jerry saves him by hurling a tomato at Tom, followed by multiple vegetables and meat chunks. After impaling them all on his rapier, Tom heats and eats them like a shish kebab. Nibbles, now drunk, climbs out of the glass and pokes Tom in the rear end, but as he runs away, Tom catches him. Jerry hits Tom on the head with a mace before having another swordfight with him. While this goes on, Nibbles brings along a cannon and stuffs it with everything on the banquet table. Just as Tom catches Jerry, Nibbles lights the cannon, which violently blasts Tom with its load.

In the aftermath, Jerry and Nibbles are seen walking triumphantly down the street with some of the stolen banquet food until they see a guillotine in the distance. Accompanied by a drum roll, the blade rises up and comes down, heavily implying that Tom has been executed for failing to uphold Rochefort's orders. Both mice gulp, and Nibbles sighs: "Pauvre, pauvre pussycat" ("Poor, poor pussycat"). Then he shrugs, saying: "C'est la guerre!" ("This is war!"), and the two Mouseketeers continue their victory march.

== Production ==
- Directed by William Hanna and Joseph Barbera
- Animation by Ed Barge, Kenneth Muse, and Irven Spence
- Music by Scott Bradley
- Produced by Fred Quimby

== Voice cast ==
Note: All voice actors are uncredited

- William Hanna as Tom (vocal effects) / Tom's yell (archival recording) / Jerry (vocal effects)
- Francoise Brun-Cottan as Nibbles
- Arthur Q. Bryan as Captaine Rochefort
- The King's Men singing Soldiers of Fortune

== Availability ==
=== LaserDisc ===
- The Art of Tom & Jerry: Volume I, Side 9 (1993)

=== DVD ===
- Tom and Jerry: The Classic Collection Volume 3, Side 2 (2004)
- Tom and Jerry Spotlight Collection Volume 1, Disc 2 (2004)
- Warner Bros. Home Entertainment Academy Awards Animation Collection, Disc 1 (2008)
- Tom and Jerry's Greatest Chases, Volume 3 (2009)
- Tom and Jerry: The Deluxe Anniversary Collection, Disc 1 (2010)
- Tom and Jerry: The Golden Era Anthology, Disc 3 (2025)

=== Blu-ray ===
- Tom and Jerry: The Golden Era Anthology, Disc 3 (2025)
