= Johann Mouse =

1953 Tom and Jerry short film

- Directed by: William Hanna; Joseph Barbera
- Story by: William Hanna; Joseph Barbera; (both uncredited)
- Produced by: Fred Quimby
- Narrated by: Hans Conried
- Cinematography: Jack Stevens (uncredited)
- Edited by: Jim Faris (uncredited)
- Music by: Scott Bradley; Johann Strauss; Piano arrangement: Jakob Gimpel
- Animation by: Kenneth Muse; Ray Patterson; Ed Barge; Irven Spence
- Layouts by: Richard Bickenbach (uncredited)
- Backgrounds by: Robert Gentle
- Color process: Technicolor
- Production company: MGM Cartoons
- Distributed by: Metro-Goldwyn-Mayer
- Release date: February 17, 1953; (earliest known date)
- Running time: 7:57
- Language: English

Johann Mouse is an American one-reel animated cartoon and the 75th Tom and Jerry cartoon, released in theaters (at least) as early as February 17, 1953 by Metro-Goldwyn-Mayer. The short is directed by William Hanna and Joseph Barbera, composed by Scott Bradley, and animated by Kenneth Muse, Ray Patterson, Ed Barge, and Irven Spence. It won the 1952 Academy Award for Best Short Subject: Cartoons, the seventh and last Oscar given to a Tom and Jerry short.

== Plot ==
In 19th century Vienna, Tom Cat and Johann Mouse played by Jerry Mouse live in the house of composer Johann Strauss. Whenever Strauss plays the piano, Johann comes out of his hole to dance to the music, and Tom repeatedly tries to catch him to no avail. One day, Strauss goes away on a journey, much to Tom's dismay. Tom realizes that the key to catching Johann would be through music, so he begins teaching himself how to play the piano using Strauss' written tutorial, "How to Play the Waltz in Six Easy Lessons." As Tom plays the piano, he is able to lure out and capture Johann, but his playing is immediately praised by the house servants, and so he lets go of Johann and happily continues his performance.

Tom's piano playing and Johann's dancing spread by word-of-mouth across Vienna, eventually reaching the Emperor of Austria Franz Joseph I. Tom and Johann are then commanded to perform at the palace before the emperor. Tom and Johann perform with vigor and delight at the palace, but Tom eventually succumbs to his instincts and tries to chase after Johann, only to fail once again and making the audience clap once again.

== Voice cast ==
- Hans Conried as The Narrator

== Production ==
As with every short of Tom and Jerry during its first two decades, Johann Mouse is directed by William Hanna and Joseph Barbera, with its score composed by Scott Bradley. The piano arrangement for the short was created and played by Jakob Gimpel, a Polish-born concert pianist (who also played the piano for Bugs Bunny in Rhapsody Rabbit). Within the Tom and Jerry series, Johann Mouse is unique for having a record album directly adapted from the short itself, released in May 1953 and with Bret Morrison substituting Hans Conried as narrator. While release date for the cartoon is unknown, most sources state that the short was released in March 21, 1953. The earliest release date was on February 17, 1953.

== Reception ==
Ben Simon of Animated Views praised Johann Mouse for its "extraordinarily exquisite watercolor production values", and noted that Hans Conried was "having fun as the narrator". Writer and historian Michael Samerdyke considered the short to be "simply adorable", and observed that continues "Tom and Jerry's romance with classic music." Samerdyke also wrote that the short has "a lovely, bittersweet feel. The storybook narration and the darling action is all sweet, but beneath it all lies the awareness that the world of Strauss waltzes and their elegance is over."

Joseph Barbera later considered Johann Mouse, alongside The Cat Concerto, to be his favorite Tom and Jerry cartoon.

== Home media ==
=== VHS ===
- Tom & Jerry Cartoon Festival Featuring Academy Award Winner Johann Mouse (1985)
- Tom & Jerry's 50th Birthday Classics III (1990)
- Tom and Jerry's Greatest Chases, Vol. 1 (2000)

=== LaserDisc ===
- The Art of Tom & Jerry: Volume I, Side 10 (1993)

=== DVD ===
- Tom and Jerry's Greatest Chases, Vol. 1 (2000)
- Tom and Jerry: The Classic Collection Volume 3, Side 2 (2004)
- Tom and Jerry Spotlight Collection Volume 1, Disc 2 (2004)
- Warner Bros. Home Entertainment Academy Awards Animation Collection: 15 Winners, Disc 1 (2008)
- Warner Bros. Home Entertainment Academy Awards Animation Collection: 15 Winners - 26 Nominees, Disc 1 (2008)
- Tom and Jerry: The Deluxe Anniversary Collection, Disc 1 (2010)
- Tom and Jerry: The Golden Era Anthology, Disc 4 (2025)

=== Blu-ray ===
- Tom and Jerry: The Golden Era Anthology, Disc 4 (2025)
