= The Little Orphan =

1949 animated short film by William Hanna, Joseph Barbera

- The title card of The Little Orphan, featuring the Oscar
- Directed by: William Hanna; Joseph Barbera
- Story by: William Hanna; Joseph Barbera (both uncredited)
- Produced by: Fred Quimby
- Starring: William Hanna (uncredited)
- Music by: Scott Bradley
- Animation by: Irven Spence; Kenneth Muse; Ed Barge; Ray Patterson
- Layouts by: Richard Bickenbach (uncredited)
- Production company: MGM Cartoons
- Distributed by: Metro-Goldwyn-Mayer
- Release date: April 30, 1949
- Running time: 7:50
- Language: English

The Little Orphan is a 1949 American one-reel animated cartoon and the 40th Tom and Jerry cartoon, released in theaters on April 30, 1949 by Metro-Goldwyn Mayer. It was produced by Fred Quimby and directed by William Hanna and Joseph Barbera, with music by Scott Bradley. The cartoon was animated by Irven Spence, Kenneth Muse, Ed Barge and Ray Patterson. The short features Nibbles, a young mouse who is insatiably hungry.

The Little Orphan won the 1948 Academy Award for Best Short Subject: Cartoons, the fifth Oscar (of seven) given to Tom and Jerry. Though the cartoon was released in 1949, it won its Oscar the previous year, tying them with Disney's Silly Symphonies with the record of the most Oscars.

== Plot ==
Jerry is sitting in a chaise longue reading and eating cheese off a mousetrap. When his doorbell rings, he opens the door and finds a small, young mouse named Nibbles. A note pinned to Nibbles' red scarf states that Nibbles is the orphan Jerry had agreed to host for Thanksgiving. A postscript on the note warns: "He's always hungry".

Jerry's cupboards are empty, so he carefully leads Nibbles to a bowl of milk in front of where Tom is sleeping, and holds him over the bowl. Nibbles takes a loud slurp, awaking Tom, but Jerry pulls Nibbles back into hiding. Tom does not see anyone, so he drinks his milk and goes back to sleep. Jerry holds Nibbles out to catch the last big drop that falls from Tom's whisker, but the bowl is now empty.

Then Jerry and Nibbles see Mammy Two Shoes place a large turkey on the already laden table. The two mice climb onto the table, and Nibbles begins to take bites of all kinds of food, exposing himself to risks Jerry has to rescue him from. Using table decorations, Jerry and Nibbles dress as pilgrims with hats and a blunderbuss. Nibbles then swallows a whole orange, swelling him, but Jerry hits Nibbles on the back of the head, causing the orange to fly out of Nibbles and into Tom's mouth, waking him up.

Tom, seeing the mice getting into the Thanksgiving dinner, puts on a feather duster, first as a general camouflage, then as a Native American headdress. Tom approaches Nibbles, who points his toy blunderbuss at Tom. Tom lowers his chin, daring him to hit him, until Jerry pops a champagne cork right into his face. Tom then grabs Jerry, but Nibbles, carrying a fork, ricochets off a jello and stabs Tom in the hind end. Tom in turn uses the fork to catch Nibbles, and Jerry whacks Tom in the face with a large spoon, knocking him back.

Sneaking back to the table, Tom sets a bowl of cattails on fire one at a time, throwing them like spears. The cattails burn or melt the various hiding places Jerry and Nibbles find. With the third one, Jerry lifts a serving dome, which reverses the cattail back toward Tom. Then Tom throws a knife into the turkey; Jerry runs into the blunt edge and knocks himself out.

Nibbles now launches an all-out attack: he bends back a knife handle to launch a pie, and using a string between the turkey's legs, he slingshots a candle, which lands on Tom's tail and burns him up to a crisp. Then he cuts a cork off a champagne bottle, which rockets at Tom and launches him into a cabinet, destroying it and all the dishes inside. Conceding defeat, Tom waves a white surrender flag from under the pile of broken dishes.

Finally, with order on the table restored, all three sit down to dinner. After Jerry has said grace, and just as he and Tom pick up their cutlery, Nibbles ravenously mows through the entire turkey, leaving nothing but the bones on the plate. Nibbles, now finally full, pats his huge stomach in delight.

== Voice cast ==
- William Hanna as vocal effects for Tom, Jerry and Nibbles (uncredited)

== Production ==
As per every short of Tom and Jerry during its first two decades, The Little Orphan was directed by William Hanna and Joseph Barbera, with its score composed by Scott Bradley. The short is produced by Fred Quimby and animated by Irven Spence, Kenneth Muse, Ed Barge, Ray Patterson, with layouts done by Richard Bickenbach.

The cartoon was remade in CinemaScope using thicker lines and more stylised backgrounds as Feedin' the Kiddie.

== Reception ==
Ben Simon of Animated Views considered the short as "a great example of a cat and mouse cartoon working well on all levels". For writer and historian Michael Samerdyke, The Little Orphan is "[o]ne of the most fondly remembered" Tom and Jerry cartoons, noting that the short "added some priceless images" to the cartoon series. He surmised that the short "unlocked something in Hanna and Barbera's imaginations. In the Fifties, instead of having their characters pretend they were in a different historical era, they would place the rivalry of Tom & Jerry in other times and places."

Animation historian Michael Barrier saw the character of Nibbles in The Little Orphan as an example of the growing sentimentality seen in Tom and Jerry in the late 1940s, as manifested in the character's "formulaic adorability".

== Home media ==
- Tom and Jerry's Greatest Chases, Vol. 1 (2000)
- Tom and Jerry Spotlight Collection (2004)
- Warner Bros. Home Entertainment Academy Awards Animation Collection: 15 Winners (2008)
- Warner Bros. Home Entertainment Academy Awards Animation Collection (2008)
- Tom and Jerry: The Deluxe Anniversary Collection (2010)
- Tom and Jerry: The Golden Era Anthology (2025)
