= Mouse Trouble =

1944 film by Joseph Barbera, William Hanna

- 1951 Reissue Poster for Mouse Trouble
- Directed by: William Hanna; Joseph Barbera
- Written by: William Hanna; Joseph Barbera (both uncredited)
- Produced by: Fred Quimby
- Starring: William Hanna; Harry E. Lang; Sara Berner (all uncredited)
- Edited by: Fred McAlpin (uncredited)
- Music by: Scott Bradley
- Animation by: Ray Patterson; Irven Spence; Kenneth Muse; Pete Burness
- Layouts by: Harvey Eisenberg (uncredited)
- Color process: Technicolor
- Production company: MGM Cartoons
- Distributed by: Metro-Goldwyn-Mayer
- Release dates: November 23, 1944; December 12, 1951 (re-release)
- Running time: 7:08
- Language: English

Mouse Trouble is a 1944 American one-reel animated cartoon short and is the 17th Tom and Jerry short produced by Fred Quimby. It was directed by William Hanna and Joseph Barbera, with music direction by Scott Bradley. The cartoon was animated by Ray Patterson, Irven Spence, Kenneth Muse, and Pete Burness. Mouse Trouble won the 1944 Oscar for Best Animated Short Film, the second consecutive award bestowed upon the series. It was released in theatres on November 23, 1944 by Metro-Goldwyn Mayer and reissued on December 12, 1951.

== Plot ==
Tom receives a book on catching mice and tries various traps and techniques outlined in it to capture Jerry. Despite his efforts, Jerry outsmarts Tom at every turn, leading to escalating chaos and violence. In a final act of desperation, Tom resorts to extreme measures, which ultimately backfire, resulting in his demise. Meanwhile, Jerry survives the ordeal, leaving Tom's spirit to ascend to the afterlife, still haunted by the book's mocking advice.

== Voice cast ==
- William Hanna as vocal effects for Tom and Jerry (uncredited)
  - Harry E. Lang as Tom laughing (uncredited)
- Sara Berner as The Mouse Toy (uncredited)

== Production ==
- Directed by: William Hanna, Joseph Barbera
- Story: William Hanna, Joseph Barbera
- Animation: Ray Patterson, Irven Spence, Kenneth Muse, Pete Burness
- Assistant Animation: Barney Posner
- Layouts: Harvey Eisenberg
- Film Editor: Fred McAlpin
- Music: Scott Bradley
- Co-Producer: William Hanna
- Produced by: Fred Quimby

== Availability ==
=== VHS ===
- Tom & Jerry's 50th Birthday Classics III (1990)

=== LaserDisc ===
- The Art of Tom & Jerry: Volume I, Side 3 (1993)

=== DVD ===
- Tom and Jerry: The Classic Collection Volume 1, Side 2 (2004)
- Tom and Jerry Spotlight Collection Volume 1, Disc 1 (2004)
- Warner Bros. Home Entertainment Academy Awards Animation Collection, Disc 1 (2008)
- Tom and Jerry's Greatest Chases Volume 2 (2009)
- Tom and Jerry: The Deluxe Anniversary Collection, Disc 1 (2010)
- Tom and Jerry Golden Collection Volume 1, Disc 1 (2011)
- Tom and Jerry: The Golden Era Anthology, Disc 1 (2025)

=== Blu-ray ===
- Tom and Jerry Golden Collection Volume 1, Disc 1 (2011)
- Tom and Jerry: The Golden Era Anthology, Disc 1 (2025)
