= The Zoot Cat =

1944 animated short film directed by Joseph Barbera

- Reissue title card
- Directed by: William Hanna; Joseph Barbera
- Produced by: Fred Quimby (uncredited on original issue)
- Starring: William Hanna; Jerry Mann; Sara Berner (all uncredited)
- Edited by: Fred McAlpin (uncredited)
- Music by: Scott Bradley
- Animation by: Ray Patterson; Kenneth Muse; Irven Spence; Pete Burness; Assisted by: Tony Ligerra; Barney Posner (both uncredited)
- Layouts by: Harvey Eisenberg (uncredited)
- Color process: Technicolor
- Production company: MGM Cartoons
- Distributed by: Metro-Goldwyn-Mayer
- Release dates: January 27, 1944 (Premiere); February 10, 1944 (United States)
- Running time: 7:03
- Language: English

The Zoot Cat is a 1944 American Technicolor one-reel animated short and is the 13th Tom and Jerry short. It was released to theatres on February 10, 1944 by Metro-Goldwyn-Mayer.

== Plot ==
Tom prepares a Valentine's Day surprise for Toots, complete with a gift box containing a note from Jerry. Despite his efforts to impress her with music, dance, Toots rejects Tom's advances, calling him, "corny", and leaving him humiliated.

After Tom hears from Toots' radio of the latest style, he dons a homemade zoot suit to impress her. Not recognising Tom, she is smitten by him and they begin dancing to music. Jerry, seizing the opportunity, teases Tom relentlessly, eventually outsmarting him. After Tom is repeatedly shoved into a fishbowl, the suit rapidly shrinks, falls out of Tom and is worn by Jerry who then struts.

== Voice cast ==
Note: All voice actors are uncredited

- Jerry Mann as Tom (both his regular voice and him impersonating Charles Boyer) / The Radio Announcer
  - William Hanna as Tom's yells (archival audio)
- Sara Berner as Jerry (with a "What's Cooking?" catchphrase) / Toots

== Availability ==
VHS

- Tom & Jerry Cartoon Festival Featuring Academy Award Winner Johann Mouse (1985)
- Tom & Jerry's 50th Birthday Classics II (1990)
- Tom and Jerry's Greatest Chases, Vol. 1 (2000)

LaserDisc

- The Art of Tom & Jerry: Volume 1, Side 2 (1993)

DVD

- Tom and Jerry's Greatest Chases, Vol. 1 (2000)
- Tom and Jerry: The Classic Collection Volume 1, Side 2 (2004)
- Tom and Jerry Spotlight Collection Vol. 1, Disc 1 (2004)
- Tom and Jerry Golden Collection Volume 1, Disc 1 (2011)
- Tom and Jerry: The Golden Era Anthology, Disc 1 (2025)

Blu-ray

- Tom and Jerry Golden Collection Volume 1, Disc 1 (2011)
- Tom and Jerry: The Golden Era Anthology, Disc 1 (2025)

iTunes

- Tom and Jerry Vol. 1

Streaming

- Boomerang App

== Censorship ==
Because of the United Kingdom's ban of TV characters smoking, Jerry smoking a cigar and a cigarette and Jerry putting the cigarette on Tom's nose is faded out.
