= Tom and Jerry Spotlight Collection =

2004 Tom and Jerry DVD collection

- Directed by: William Hanna; Joseph Barbera
- Produced by: Hanna-Barbera; M-G-M Cartoon Studio; Fred Quimby; William Hanna; Joseph Barbera; Rudolf Ising
- Starring: Tom Cat; Jerry Mouse
- Music by: Scott Bradley; Edward Plumb ("The Missing Mouse")
- Distributed by: Warner Home Video
- Release dates: October 19, 2004 (Volume 1); October 25, 2005 (Volume 2); September 11, 2007 (Volume 3)

The Tom and Jerry Spotlight Collection is a series of two-disc DVD sets released by Warner Home Video. Originally planned as an uncensored, chronological set, the issued Spotlight Collection sets include selected Tom and Jerry shorts on each volume. Volume 1 was released on October 19, 2004, Volume 2 on October 25, 2005, and the third and final volume on September 11, 2007. On October 15, 2019, the set, which consists of 4 discs, was repackaged with some errors fixed.

== Contents ==
The following 112 shorts were directed by William Hanna and Joseph Barbera at the Metro-Goldwyn-Mayer cartoon studio in Hollywood, California. All shorts were released to theaters by Metro-Goldwyn-Mayer between 1940 and 1958. The original MGM Hanna-Barbera classics are a total of 114 shorts.

=== Spotlight Collection ===
A superscripted one ( ^{1} ) denotes cartoons presented in the CinemaScope aspect ratio using a new anamorphic widescreen transfer.

==== Disc 1 ====
Disc one contains shorts from the 1940s.

1. The Yankee Doodle Mouse
2. Sufferin' Cats!
3. Baby Puss
4. The Zoot Cat
5. The Million Dollar Cat
6. The Bodyguard
7. Mouse Trouble
8. Tee for Two
9. Flirty Birdy
10. Quiet Please!
11. The Milky Waif
12. Solid Serenade
13. Cat Fishin'
14. The Cat Concerto
15. Kitty Foiled
16. The Truce Hurts
17. Salt Water Tabby
18. The Invisible Mouse
19. The Little Orphan
20. Heavenly Puss

==== Disc 2 ====
Disc 2 contains shorts from the 1950s.

1. Texas Tom
2. Jerry and the Lion
3. The Hollywood Bowl
4. Jerry and the Goldfish
5. Cue Ball Cat
6. Slicked-up Pup
7. Jerry's Cousin
8. Cat Napping
9. The Flying Cat
10. The Two Mouseketeers
11. Smitten Kitten
12. Johann Mouse
13. Two Little Indians
14. Baby Butch
15. Mice Follies
16. Designs on Jerry
17. Pecos Pest
18. Touché, Pussy Cat! ^{1}
19. The Flying Sorceress ^{1}
20. Blue Cat Blues ^{1}

==== Bonus features ====
- Commentary by Jerry Beck on: The Zoot Cat, Kitty Foiled, and Heavenly Puss
- "Behind the Tunes: The MGM Orchestra" (documentary on the music of Tom and Jerry)
- "How Bill and Joe Met Tom and Jerry" (documentary on the origin of the series)
- Jerry Dances with Gene Kelly (excerpt from Anchors Aweigh)
- Tom and Jerry Swim with Esther Williams (excerpt from Dangerous When Wet)

=== Spotlight Collection, Vol. 2 ===

A superscripted one ( ^{1} ) denotes cartoons in the standard Academy ratio presented in newly remastered versions. A superscripted two ( ^{2} ) denotes cartoons presented in the CinemaScope aspect ratio using a new anamorphic widescreen transfer.

==== Disc 1 ====
Disc 1 contains shorts from the 1940s.

1. Puss Gets the Boot ^{1}
2. The Midnight Snack ^{1}
3. The Night Before Christmas
4. Fraidy Cat ^{1}
5. Dog Trouble ^{1}
6. Puss n' Toots ^{1}
7. The Bowling Alley Cat
8. Fine Feathered Friend
9. The Lonesome Mouse
10. Puttin' on the Dog
11. The Mouse Comes to Dinner
12. Mouse in Manhattan
13. Springtime for Thomas
14. Trap Happy
15. Part Time Pal
16. Dr. Jekyll and Mr. Mouse
17. Old Rockin' Chair Tom
18. Professor Tom
19. The Cat and the Mermouse
20. Polka-Dot Puss

==== Disc 2 ====
Disc two contains shorts from the 1950s.

1. Saturday Evening Puss
2. Little Quacker
3. Texas Tom (repeat)
4. Safety Second
5. Sleepy-Time Tom
6. Nit-Witty Kitty
7. Cruise Cat
8. Triplet Trouble
9. Push-Button Kitty
10. The Missing Mouse
11. Jerry and Jumbo
12. Just Ducky
13. Little School Mouse
14. Tom and Chérie ^{2}
15. Muscle Beach Tom ^{2}
16. Down Beat Bear ^{2}
17. Mucho Mouse ^{2}
18. Tot Watchers ^{2}

==== Bonus features ====
- An introduction by Whoopi Goldberg where Goldberg explains that the Tom and Jerry cartoons may contain racial stereotyping (particularly centered on the appearance of Mammy Two-Shoes) that may offend some modern-day viewers. A similar introduction is in the third volume of the Looney Tunes Golden Collection.
- Commentary tracks on Puss Gets the Boot, The Night Before Christmas, Dr. Jekyll and Mr. Mouse, and Saturday Evening Puss by MADtv castmember Nicole Parker and animation historian Earl Kress
- "Animators as Actors": Actor's workshop of where the inspiration for character personalities come from
- "The Comedy Stylings of Tom and Jerry" (featuring appearances by Mark Kausler, Jerry Beck, and MADtv castmembers Nicole Parker and Ike Barinholtz)
- "Silent Pencil Sketch: 'The Midnight Snack'"

=== Spotlight Collection, Vol. 3 ===

Vol. 3 completes the Hanna-Barbera Tom and Jerry cartoons, save for Mouse Cleaning and Casanova Cat. According to a Warner Home Video press release, these cartoons were omitted from the set for racial stereotyping. (These cartoons are presented uncut on the European PAL DVD set Tom and Jerry: The Classic Collection, with Mouse Cleaning appearing on Vol. 2 and Casanova Cat appearing on Vol. 3 of that series.)

==== Disc 1 ====
Disc one contains non-CinemaScope shorts.

1. A Mouse in the House
2. Hatch Up Your Troubles
3. Love That Pup
4. Jerry's Diary
5. Tennis Chumps
6. The Framed Cat
7. His Mouse Friday (Edited)
8. The Duck Doctor
9. Little Runaway
10. Fit to Be Tied
11. The Dog House
12. That's My Pup!
13. Life with Tom
14. Puppy Tale
15. Posse Cat
16. Hic-cup Pup
17. Downhearted Duckling
18. Neapolitan Mouse
19. Mouse for Sale
20. Smarty Cat

==== Disc 2 ====
Disc two contains shorts presented in the CinemaScope format, all in new anamorphic widescreen transfers. However, one short, Pup on a Picnic, is presented in a cropped and zoomed 16:9 version rather than in its true 2.35:1 proportions. This short was later released by Warner on streaming in its correct aspect ratio.

1. Pet Peeve
2. Southbound Duckling
3. Pup on a Picnic
4. That's My Mommy
5. The Egg and Jerry
6. Busy Buddies
7. Barbecue Brawl
8. Tops with Pops
9. Timid Tabby
10. Feedin' the Kiddie
11. Tom's Photo Finish
12. Happy Go Ducky
13. Royal Cat Nap
14. The Vanishing Duck
15. Robin Hoodwinked

==== Bonus features ====
- "Cat and Mouse: The Tale of Tom and Jerry": a documentary on the history of the Tom and Jerry shorts, and the censorship issues the series has had to deal with.
- The Karate Guard, a 2005 Tom and Jerry short directed by co-creator Joseph Barbera.

== Censorship ==
The Tom and Jerry Spotlight Collection sets contain shorts that have been altered from their original versions.

The first volume contains three shorts (The Milky Waif, The Truce Hurts, and The Little Orphan) that include depictions of blackface. Censored versions of these were in the 2004 release, though Warner corrected this through a disc replacement program, which began in 2006. Subsequent releases are not censored.

The second volume contains four shorts (The Lonesome Mouse, Polka-Dot Puss, Saturday Evening Puss and Nit-Witty Kitty) with edited sound tracks. These four shorts contained a redubbed Mammy Two Shoes audio track, instead of the original. Similarly to the first volume, Warner instated a disc replacement program, and later reprints contain the original Mammy Two Shoes tracks.

The final volume contains an edited version of His Mouse Friday (1951). The shorts Mouse Cleaning (1948) and Casanova Cat (1951) were omitted from the set due to their inappropriate racial stereotypes, according to a statement from Warner Home Video. These two shorts were the only original Tom and Jerry shorts not present in the Spotlight Collection series; however, the two shorts are on the European Classic Collection.

== See also ==
- Tom and Jerry Golden Collection
- Tom and Jerry: The Chuck Jones Collection
- Tom and Jerry: The Gene Deitch Collection
