= Puss Gets the Boot =

1940 film by William Hanna and Joseph Barbera

- Title card
- Directed by: William Hanna; Joseph Barbera; (both uncredited)
- Produced by: Rudolf Ising; Fred Quimby; (uncredited)
- Starring: Lillian Randolph; Harry E. Lang; (both uncredited)
- Music by: Scott Bradley (uncredited)
- Color process: Technicolor
- Production company: Metro-Goldwyn-Mayer
- Distributed by: Loew's, Inc.
- Release date: February 10, 1940
- Running time: 9 min
- Country: United States
- Language: English

Puss Gets the Boot is a 1940 American animated comedy short film directed by William Hanna and Joseph Barbera. It is the first appearances of Tom Cat and Jerry Mouse in what would become the Tom and Jerry cartoon series, though neither are yet referred to by these names. It was Barbera's directorial debut, with Hanna and Barbera directing under producer Rudolf Ising's unit, where they served as storymen; neither were credited as a result.

In this short, the cat is named Jasper, and appears to be a scruffy, battle-hardened street cat, more malicious than the character that Tom would develop into over time. The unnamed mouse (referred to as Pee-Wee in an official MGM magazine), is similar to who would become the Jerry character, albeit slightly thinner. The basic premise is one that would become familiar to audiences; in The Art of Hanna-Barbera, Ted Sennett sums it up as "cat stalks and chases mouse in a frenzy of mayhem and slapstick violence". Though the studio executives were unimpressed, audiences loved the film and it was nominated for an Academy Award. This short ultimately lost to The Milky Way, another MGM short directed by Ising.

== Plot ==
The first appearance of Tom and Jerry.

A cat named Jasper takes great pleasure in tormenting an unnamed mouse (referred to in a magazine as Pee-Wee), who is trying to run away while he keeps grabbing the tail to keep him from running anywhere. Eventually, the mouse breaks free but goes into Jasper's mouth, narrowly escaping. Jasper then draws a hole on the wall to trick the mouse into entering it. The mouse bangs against the wall so hard that it knocks him out. Jasper revives him using water from the fish tank and picks him up. Having slowly realized the situation, the mouse punches Jasper in the eye, causing him to yelp and screech in pain. The angry cat chases the mouse and accidentally bumps into a Greek pillar, where it breaks upon falling onto him along with the flowerpot that was standing on it.

The maid enters the room and scolds Jasper for his unacceptable behavior despite it being an accident, issuing him an ultimatum that if she catches him having broke something again, he will get kicked out of the house. Jasper sulks off, the mouse chuckles at him and this causes Jasper to chase him, but when the mouse holds a glass over the edge of the table, Jasper backs off after seeing the maid furiously walking away with the remains of the broken flowerpot, fearing that he will begin to get himself into trouble again.

After the mouse puts the glass down, Jasper sees his chance and rushes at him, but the mouse holds Jasper back by threatening to drop the glass again. Then the mouse drops the glass and Jasper rushes to catch it. The mouse throws more cups, making it very hard for Jasper to catch them all. As the mouse walks away with the last cup, feeling confident that he has the advantage, Jasper drops a bunch of pillows on the ground. When the mouse tries to expel Jasper by dropping the glass, it stays intact when it lands on the soft surface of one of the pillows. The mouse tries to escape but Jasper catches him by the tail, causing the former to recite "Now I Lay Me Down to Sleep". Jasper inadvertently throws the mouse onto a shelf, where he escapes and begins pelting him with several dishes, making sure that Jasper will "get the boot." Jasper begins to feel tired of holding all the dishes, and can only watch as the mouse drops one last dish on the ground, breaking it, and thus alerting the maid into thinking Jasper violated her ultimatum.

The maid once again enters the room in frustration just as the mouse swims in Jasper's milk bowl, uses his tail as a towel and finally kicks Jasper, causing him to drop all of the dishes, creating a huge mess and framing him for making it. The mouse flees the scene and dives into his hole just as the maid hits Jasper with a broom, throws him out of the house and slams the door shut. As Jasper is dragged away, the mouse waves to him, sticks his tongue out, puts a HOME SWEET HOME sign (seen earlier in the hole on the wall trick) in front of his hole, and enters it.

== Voice cast ==
- Harry E. Lang as Jasper and an unnamed mouse (vocal effects) (uncredited)
- Lillian Randolph as The Maid (original) (uncredited)
  - June Foray and Thea Vidale as The Maid (re-edited) (uncredited)

== Production and release ==
In June 1937, Terrytoons alumnus and storyman Joseph Barbera began to work for Rudolf Ising's unit at Metro-Goldwyn-Mayer's cartoon department, where he became acquainted with fellow Ising unit storyman William Hanna. He learned that co-owner Louis B. Mayer wished to boost the animation department by encouraging the artists to develop some new cartoon characters, following the lack of success with its earlier cartoon series based on The Captain and the Kids comic strip. Barbera then teamed with Hanna and pitched new ideas, among them was the concept of two "equal characters who were always in conflict with each other". An early thought involved a fox and a dog before they settled on a cat and mouse. The pair discussed their ideas with producer Fred Quimby, then the head of the short film department who, despite a lack of interest in it, gave them the green-light to produce one cartoon short. Rudolf Ising was credited as producer, with the directors remaining unknown until Hanna and Barbera acknowledged their involvement.

The short, Puss Gets the Boot, featured a cat named Jasper and an unnamed mouse, and an African American housemaid. Leonard Maltin described it as "very new and special [...] that was to change the course of MGM cartoon production" and established the successful Tom and Jerry formula of comical cat and mouse chases with slapstick gags. It was released onto the theatre circuit on February 10, 1940, and the pair, having been advised by management not to produce any more, focused on other cartoons including Gallopin' Gals (1940) and Officer Pooch (1941). Matters changed, however, when Texas businesswoman Bessa Short sent a letter to MGM asking whether more cat and mouse shorts would be produced, which helped convince management to commission a series. After MGM gave the green-light for Hanna and Barbera to continue, Hanna and Barbera were given their own unit of animators and entered production on The Midnight Snack (1941). A studio contest held to rename both characters was won by animator John Carr, who suggested Tom the cat and Jerry the mouse after the popular Christmastime cocktail, itself derived from the names of two characters in an 1821 stage play by William Moncrieff, an adaptation of 1821 Pierce Egan's book titled Life in London where the names originated, which was based on George Cruikshank's, Isaac Robert Cruikshank's, and Egan's own careers. Carr was awarded a first place prize of $50. Puss Gets the Boot was a critical success, earning an Academy Award nomination for Best Short Subject: Cartoons in 1941. Despite the film's popularity, it was not reissued for unknown reasons, leading it to keep its original titles as a result.

== Reception ==
Motion Picture Exhibitor reviewed the short on March 6, 1940: "Puss teases the mouse but when the latter learns that breakage in the house will lead to Puss being thrown out, the fun begins. Windup has the crockery crashing, the mouse victorious, Puss getting the boot."

== Availability ==
Blu-ray

- Tom and Jerry Golden Collection, Volume 1, Disc 1
- Tom and Jerry: The Golden Era Anthology, Disc 1

DVD

- Tom and Jerry Spotlight Collection: Double Feature, Disc 1
- Warner Bros. Home Entertainment Academy Award-Nominated Animation: Cinema Favorites
- Tom and Jerry Golden Collection, Volume 1, Disc 1
- Tom and Jerry: The Deluxe Anniversary Collection, Disc 1
- Warner Bros. Home Entertainment Academy Awards Animation Collection, Disc 2
- Tom and Jerry Spotlight Collection, Volume 2, Disc 1
- Tom and Jerry: The Golden Era Anthology, Disc 1

VHS

- Tom & Jerry's 50th Birthday Classics

Laserdisc

- The Art of Tom and Jerry Volume 1, Disc 1, Side 1
- Tom & Jerry Classics

iTunes

- Tom and Jerry, Volume 2
