= The Night Before Christmas (1941 film) =

1941 film by Joseph Barbera, William Hanna

- Directed by: Supervised by: William Hanna; Joseph Barbera
- Story by: William Hanna; Joseph Barbera (both uncredited)
- Produced by: Co-produced by: Fred Quimby (uncredited); William Hanna (uncredited)
- Starring: William Hanna; Harry E. Lang (both uncredited)
- Narrated by: Frank Graham (uncredited)
- Music by: Scott Bradley (uncredited)
- Animation by: Uncredited animation: George Gordon; Bill Littlejohn; Cecil Surry; Irven Spence; Jack Zander
- Layouts by: Harvey Eisenberg; Robert Gentle (both uncredited)
- Backgrounds by: Joseph Smith (uncredited)
- Color process: Technicolor
- Production company: MGM Cartoons
- Distributed by: Metro-Goldwyn-Mayer
- Release date: December 6, 1941
- Running time: 8:38
- Language: English

The Night Before Christmas is a 1941 American one-reel animated cartoon and is the third Tom and Jerry short directed by William Hanna and Joseph Barbera, produced by Fred Quimby and animated by Jack Zander, George Gordon, Irven Spence and Bill Littlejohn. It was nominated for the 1941 Academy Award for Best Short Subject: Cartoons, but lost to the Mickey Mouse short film Lend a Paw, making it the only Tom and Jerry cartoon to lose to a Disney film.

== Plot ==
'Twas the Night Before Christmas and all through the house, not a creature was stirring, not even a mouse. But Jerry emerges from his hole avoiding a Christmas-themed mousetrap placed by his hole. Jerry nears the Christmas presents, jumping merrily around the tree, licking candy canes and jumping onto a plush toy lion that squeaks. Jerry continues jumping on the soft toy, but bounces too hard and lands on Tom, who he inadvertently wakes up. Tom snarls and just before he can eat Jerry, the quick-thinking mouse grabs a nearby "Do Not Open 'Til Xmas" sticker and slaps it on Tom's mouth.

Jerry is chased among the myriad of toys (briefly stopping to fire a trick field gun's cork stopper at Tom) and hides inside a Christmas fairy light, causing him to glow. Not fooled, Tom grabs Jerry and is promptly electrocuted. Jerry hides among some toy soldiers, but Tom spots him and the mouse runs off, saluting the cat like a real soldier would. Tom chases Jerry but is stopped by the barrier of a miniature level crossing. A toy train passes by, with many carriages. Jerry sits on top of the caboose, waving cheekily at Tom and pulling faces. As the train enters a model of a tunnel and Jerry hits his head, knocking him onto the track. He runs through the tunnel, pursued by Tom, who knocks the tunnel over. Jerry hides inside a boxing glove and boxes the puzzled cat in the face before running off behind the Christmas tree. Tom, now arming himself with a boxing glove of his own, follows him and spots him jumping into a jack-in-the-box. Opening up the box, Tom is punched by the boxing glove stuck on Jack's head and is knocked out. Jerry jumps out and holds it up in victory like a boxing referee.

Tom chases Jerry once again, but Jerry holds out a piece of mistletoe in front of him and persuades an embarrassed Tom to kiss him. Tom blushes and while his back is turned, Jerry kicks him in the rear. The mouse darts through the letterbox slot into the outdoors. As Tom opens the lid of the letterbox to see where Jerry has gone, Jerry hurls a snowball at his face. In response, Tom angrily barricades the slot to prevent Jerry from getting back into the house.

While Jerry trudges up and down in the heavy snow in a vain attempt to keep warm, Tom fluffs up his cushion and prepares to sleep. He is unable to settle himself; heavenly choirs sing carols breaking their silence, pricking Tom's conscience with the message of Christmas peace and goodwill. He first props open the slot to allow Jerry back in and when the mouse does not reappear, ventures anxiously outside to find a hypothermic Jerry, frozen into a solid popsicle. Fearing for Jerry's life, he brings the frozen mouse indoors and warms him up by the fire, saving his life. Slowly, Jerry regains consciousness but is still wary of the cat. Tom hands Jerry a candy cane, his Christmas present. A delighted Jerry licks his cane, but then quickly reacts to prevent Tom drinking from his bowl of milk. He dips his cane into the bowl and a loud snap is heard. Jerry uses the cane to fish a mousetrap that he had earlier planted in the bowl. Tom appreciates Jerry's warning and the mouse runs back to his hole. He uses his candy cane to hook the cheese off the mousetrap. Instead of snapping like a usual mousetrap does, however, the spring slowly comes down, ringing the tune of "Jingle Bells" as Jerry smiles in admiration to the "musical mousetrap".

== Voice cast ==
- Harry E. Lang and William Hanna as both Tom Cat and Jerry Mouse (various vocal effects)
- Frank Graham as The Narrator
- The King's Men (Bud Linn, Jon Dodson, Rad Robinson, Ken Darby) and The Debutantes (Betty Noyes, Marge Briggs, Dorothy Compton) as the choir singing Christmas carols

== Crew ==
- Supervised by: William Hanna, Joseph Barbera
- Story: Joseph Barbera, William Hanna
- Animation: George Gordon, Bill Littlejohn, Irven Spence, Jack Zander, Cecil Surry
- Backgrounds: Joseph Smith
- Music: Scott Bradley
- Co-Produced by: Fred Quimby, William Hanna

== Release and reception ==
”The Night Before Christmas was released on December 6, 1941 – the day before the Imperial Japanese Navy initiated their surprise attack on Pearl Harbor. This cartoon’s message of peace during Christmas might’ve been the last semblance of goodwill amongst American audiences before the country entered World War II.”, wrote Devon Baxter of CartoonResearch.com.

== Home media ==
DVD

- Tom and Jerry's Greatest Chases, Vol. 3
- Tom and Jerry Golden Collection Volume One, Disc 1
- Tom and Jerry Spotlight Collection Volume Two, Disc 1
- Warner Bros. Home Entertainment Academy Awards Animation Collection, Disc 2
- Warner Bros. Home Entertainment Academy Award-Nominated Animation – Cinema Favorites
- Tom and Jerry Spotlight Collection Double Feature, Disc 1
- Tom and Jerry: Santa's Little Helpers, Disc 1
- Tom and Jerry: The Golden Era Anthology, Disc 1

Blu-ray

- Tom and Jerry Golden Collection Volume One, Disc 1
- Tom and Jerry: A Nutcracker Tale Special Edition, Disc 1
- Tom and Jerry: The Golden Era Anthology, Disc 1

VHS

- Tom & Jerry's 50th Birthday Classics 3
- Tom & Jerry's The Night Before Christmas

LaserDisc

- The Art of Tom & Jerry Vol. 1, Side 1

Streaming

- HBO Max

== Trivia ==
This third cartoon uses what has become the basic "cat stalks mouse" premise, but also hints at a softening in Tom's character: when Jerry is out in the freezing cold, Tom worries about him, indicating that their rivalry may not be entirely a fight to the death.

This short was aired as part of the MeTV Christmas special titled "MeTV's Super Colossal Cartoon Christmas" that was hosted by characters from Toon In with Me and Svengoolie.

It is also one of the first two Tom and Jerry Christmas-themed shorts produced by Metro-Goldwyn-Mayer, followed by The Tom and Jerry Comedy Show's "Snowbrawl" episode (co-produced by MGM Television and Filmation). Ted Turner acquired the rights for Tom and Jerry and other characters from MGM Cartoon Studio in 1986 (later merged with Warner Bros. since 1996).

Other Tom and Jerry Christmas-themed specials are the Tom and Jerry Tales episode "Ho Ho Horrors", several direct-to-video holiday movies starring Tom and Jerry (including Tom and Jerry: A Nutcracker Tale and Tom and Jerry: Snowman's Land) and several episodes (including one TV special) from The Tom and Jerry Show (2014), including Santa's Little Helpers, The Plight Before Christmas and Dragon Down the Holidays.

The phenomenon where Tom attempts to revive Jerry is also reused in the 1960s Tom and Jerry short film, Snowbody Loves Me, this time by wrapping Jerry in a scarf and having him drink a warm schnapps.

== See also ==
- List of Christmas films
