= Quiet Please! =

1945 film directed by William Hanna and Joseph Barbera

- Theatrical Poster
- Directed by: William Hanna; Joseph Barbera
- Produced by: Fred Quimby
- Starring: William Hanna (uncredited); Harry E. Lang (uncredited); Billy Bletcher (uncredited)
- Cinematography: Jack Stevens (uncredited)
- Edited by: Fred MacAlpin (uncredited)
- Music by: Scott Bradley
- Animation by: Kenneth Muse; Ray Patterson; Irven Spence; Ed Barge
- Layouts by: Harvey Eisenberg (uncredited)
- Backgrounds by: Robert Gentle (uncredited)
- Color process: Technicolor
- Production company: MGM Cartoons
- Distributed by: Metro-Goldwyn-Mayer
- Release dates: December 22, 1945; March 28, 1953 (re-issue)
- Running time: 7:36
- Language: English

Quiet Please! is a 1945 American one-reel animated cartoon and is the 22nd Tom and Jerry short. It was produced by Fred Quimby, directed by William Hanna and Joseph Barbera, with the music score by Scott Bradley. It was animated by Kenneth Muse, Ray Patterson, Irven Spence, and Ed Barge. Harvey Eisenberg worked as the layout artist and Robert Gentle functioned as the background artist. Both were uncredited. Quiet Please! won the 1945 Oscar for Best Animated Short Film, Tom and Jerry's third consecutive award. Quiet Please! was released on December 22, 1945, with the reissue being released on March 28, 1953.

In this short, Spike, whose nap is being interrupted by Tom's racket while chasing Jerry, warns Tom not to wake him up. Overhearing this, Jerry tries to wake Spike up in various ways, forcing Tom to stop him.

== Plot ==
Tom (left) is repeatedly trying to hit Jerry, (middle) much to Spike's (right) annoyance.

Spike is trying to take a nap, but Tom disturbs him while chasing Jerry. Before going to sleep, Spike, exasperated with the constant noise, grabs Tom, tells him to keep it down and threatens to skin him alive if he doesn't. Overhearing this, Jerry proceeds to do many things to try to wake Spike throughout the short, which in turn, forces Tom to prevent Spike from waking up. At one point, Jerry makes Tom drop multiple light bulbs, waking Spike up for a second, but Tom quickly makes Spike fall back to sleep by singing Rock-a-bye Baby.

To prevent Spike from waking up again, Tom gives him a medication called "knock out drops". Jerry doesn't realize this, as he starts playing a drum loudly. Tom takes the drum and starts playing it on the asleep Spike and shows Jerry the medication, to his shock. Upon realizing this, Jerry runs to the kitchen and writes a will with it promising a custard pie. Tom asks Jerry to have the pie with Jerry throwing the pie at Tom's face. After this, Jerry would try many ways to wake Spike up, but none of them would work due to the medications given to him earlier.

After getting his toe flattened by Jerry hitting it with a hammer, Tom sees Jerry lighting a stick of dynamite under Spike. As he tries to remove the dynamite, Spike's medication wears off as he wakes up. Since Tom woke him up, Spike growls at Tom which forces Tom to leave him to get blown up by the explosive. This infuriates Spike as he beats Tom up. After this, an injured and blind Tom with casts and patches all over his body rocks Spike and Jerry in a cradle.

== Voice cast ==
- William Hanna as Tom's vocal effects
  - Harry E. Lang for Tom's speaking voice
- Billy Bletcher as Spike

== Production ==
Production drawings by Irven Spence

Quiet Please! was directed by William Hanna and Joseph Barbera, who directed every Tom and Jerry short produced by the MGM Cartoon Studio. Fred Quimby produced the short, and the music score was done by Scott Bradley. Ray Patterson, Irven Spence, Kenneth Muse, and Ed Barge all animated the cartoon. Uncredited work was done by Harvey Eisenberg and Robert Gentle; the former of which was the layout artist, and the latter was the background artist. Animation production started as early as May 20, 1944, with the production number being #131. The short Love Boids, which was later renamed to Flirty Birdy before release, preceded Quiet Please! in terms of production and release date which makes it the 22nd Tom and Jerry short to be released. Mouse in Manhattan follows the Quiet Please! in terms of production, but was released before the cartoon.

By this short, the four key animators of Tom and Jerry which consists of Kenneth Muse, Ray Patterson, Irven Spence, and Ed Barge was formed. Ray Patterson, a former Disney animator, animated the first scene with Tom chasing Jerry with various weapons and the scene where Spike warns Tom not to disrupt his nap. Animation historian Mark Kausler presumes that Patterson liked animating scenes with Spike because of his experience with animating Pluto at Disney. Irven Spence, often referred to as the "cartoony" animator, animated the scene where Tom hides behind a couch. His work is continued until Tom covers Spike's ears. Kausler stated that Spence animated "speed lines" whenever a character ran.

Kenneth Muse, a former Disney animator, and a former assistant to Fred Moore during that tenure, animated the following sequence until Jerry runs into the kitchen. Kausler states that Muse drew characters in a more "solid" form, and that Muse animated Tom with crossed whiskers. Ed Barge, a former assistant to Spence, animated the scene where Jerry throws a pie at Tom's face. Barge also animated the sequence where Tom catches a hiding Jerry, after being previously chased by Tom as animated by Spence. After Barge's work, Muse animated the scene of Tom getting his foot flattened by a hammer. After that, Spence animates of Tom trying to remove a stick of dynamite under Spike. Muse animated the rest of the short which shows Tom rocking Spike and Jerry in a cradle.

== Reception ==
Ben Simon states that Quiet Please! "plays on a similar premise as [The] Million Dollar Cat". In terms of its formulaic approach, he states that "it's often amazing to see them picking up plaudits for generally routine outings or cartoons based on others' ideas, situations and gags." Author Thad Komorowski praises the cartoon as it is "[f]unny stuff," though he finds it strange as it is "an Oscar-winner, for some reason." In contrast, author Michael Lyons states that it is a "quintessential Tom and Jerry short that deserved its Oscar win." A Motion Picture Herald editor says that it is a "[g]ood cartoon with a lot of laughs". Another editor called it "everything a cartoon should be," as "it is hilarious, well made and satisfying to the audience."

In a commentary for Tom and Jerry Golden Collection, Historian Mark Kausler compliments the animation:

"They stand out even more... [with] the exaggerations in Tom and Jerry because the style is not stylized. It's very constructive, everything's drawn with circles, ovals [and] connecting lines. And I think that makes the exaggerations seem even more wild and abstract just because the contrast with the more conservative design of the characters."

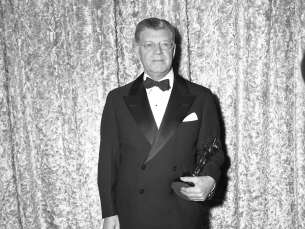
Fred Quimby, the producer of the cartoon, with the short's Oscar in hand

Quiet Please! won the 1945 Oscar for Best Animated Short Subject, making it the 3rd out of 4 consecutive wins Tom and Jerry won from 1943 to 1946.

== Release ==
Quiet Please! was released to theaters on December 22, 1945. Quiet Please! was reissued, as for most Tom and Jerry shorts released in the 1940s, on March 28, 1953.
