= Harry E. Lang =

American actor (1894–1953)

- Born: Harry Edward Lang; December 29, 1894; New York City, U.S.
- Died: August 5, 1953 (aged 58); Hollywood, California, U.S.
- Occupation: Actor
- Years active: 1929–1953

Harry Edward Lang (December 29, 1894 – August 5, 1953) was an American actor who appeared in The Cisco Kid. He was known for working at the Metro-Goldwyn-Mayer cartoon department.

== Biography ==
Lang was born on December 29, 1894, in New York City. He made his film debut in the 1929 Vitaphone short, Who's Who?, in which he and partner Bernice Haley performed an early version of Who's on First? Lang and Haley also performed in a 1930 comedy skit named "Who's Your Boss?".

He provided vocal effects for Tom in the Tom and Jerry cartoons from 1940 to 1953, and occasionally did the speaking voice for Tom from 1943 to 1946.

In 1946, he was cast as Pancho in The Cisco Kid radio series, opposite Jack Mather in the title role.

== Death ==
In 1953, Lang fell ill with heart trouble and was forced to leave The Cisco Kid. After a brief return to the show, he died from a heart attack on August 5 that year, at his home in Hollywood, California. Mel Blanc replaced him as Pancho until the series ended in 1956.

== Filmography ==
=== Film ===
Year	Title	Role	Notes	Ref(s).
1929	Who's Who?	Skit Performer	Uncredited	
1933	Parade of the Wooden Soldiers	Voice, uncredited		
1936	Wash Your Step			
1937	The Wayward Pups	Cat	Voice, uncredited	
1938	Buried Treasure	Leopard	Voice, uncredited	
1938	There Goes My Heart	Newsboy	Uncredited	
1939	Jitterbug Follies	Announcer, Heckling Penguin singing	Voice, uncredited	
1939	The Little Goldfish	Undersea Creatures	Voice, uncredited	
1939	Bad Boy	Vanetti	Uncredited	
1939	Dick Tracy's G-Men	Barossa	Uncredited	
1939	Rio	Taxi Driver	Uncredited	
1940	Puss Gets the Boot	Jasper	Voice, uncredited	
1940	The Egg Hunt	Jeeves, Platypus	Voice, uncredited	
1941	The Alley Cat	Tom, Toodles Galore, Butler	Voice, uncredited	
1941	The Midnight Snack	Tom Cat	Voice, uncredited	
1941	Sing for Your Supper	Musician	Uncredited	
1941	The Fox and the Grapes	Fox (whistling)	Voice, uncredited	
1941	The Tangled Angler	Fish (whistling)	Voice, uncredited	
1941	The Night Before Christmas	Tom Cat	Voice, uncredited	
1942	Fraidy Cat	Tom Cat	Voice, uncredited	
1942	Chips off the Old Block	Butch	Voice, uncredited	
1942	A Battle for a Bottle	Cat	Voice, uncredited	
1942	Old Blackout Joe	Air Raid Warden, "All clear!"	Voice, uncredited	
1942	Song of Victory	Hitler Vulture	Voice, uncredited	
1942	The Gullible Canary	Crow	Voice, uncredited	
1942	Fine Feathered Friend	Tom Cat	Voice, uncredited	
1942	Malice in Slumberland	Vocal effects	Voice, uncredited	
1943	Sufferin' Cats!	Tom Cat, Meathead, Tom's Conscience	Voice, uncredited	
1943	Kindly Scram	Igor Puzzlewitz, Bull	Voice, uncredited	
1943	Plenty Below Zero	Crow (saying "Moron")	Voice, uncredited	
1943	The Lonesome Mouse	Tom Cat, Jerry Mouse, Jerry's Inner Voice	Voice, uncredited	
1943	Reason and Emotion	Radio News Voice, Listener, Dummy, Donkey Man, Adolf Hitler	Voice, uncredited	
1943	Nursery Crimes	Mouse	Voice, uncredited	
1943	The Cocky Bantam	Freddy Falcon, Japanese	Voice, uncredited	
1943	Baby Puss	Tom Cat, Topsy Cat	Voice, uncredited	
1943	The Herring Murder Mystery	Igor Puzzlewitz, Sherlock Shad, Bailiff, Smoked Salmon, Mackerel, Sliverfish, Herring	Voice, uncredited	
1944	The Greatest Man in Siam	King Size, Smartest Man in Siam, Draft Board Man, Richest Man in Siam, Fastest Man in Siam, Hottest Man in Siam, additional voices	Voice, uncredited	
1944	Giddy Yapping	Igor Puzzlewitz	Voice, uncredited	
1944	Mr. Fore by Fore	Igor Puzzlewitz, Bull	Voice, uncredited	
1944	Fish Fry	Andy Panda	Voice, uncredited	
1944	The Bodyguard	Tom Cat, Jerry Mouse	Voice, uncredited	
1944	As the Fly Flies	Igor Puzzlewitz	Voice, uncredited	
1944	Mouse Trouble	Tom Cat	Voice, uncredited	
1945	Dog, Cat and Canary	Flippity and Flop	Voice, uncredited	
1945	The Pied Piper of Basin Street	Mayor	Voice, uncredited	
1945	Mouse in Manhattan	Jerry Mouse, Alley Cat	Voice, uncredited	
1945	Booby Socks	Cat	Voice, uncredited	
1945	Donald's Crime	Donald's Conscience	Voice, uncredited	
1945	Duck Pimples	Leslie J. Clark	Voice, uncredited	
1945	Phoney Baloney	Newsboy #2	Voice, uncredited	
1945	Captain Tugboat Annie	Man	Uncredited	
1945	Speaking of Animals: From A to Zoo	Hippopotamus	Voice, uncredited	
1945	Quiet Please!	Tom Cat	Voice, uncredited	
1946	Catnipped	Surgeons, Flippity and Flop	Voice, uncredited	
1946	The Hick Chick	Charles (screeching sounds)	Voice, uncredited	
1946	Solid Serenade	Tom Cat	Voice, uncredited	
1946	Cagey Bird	Flippity	Voice, uncredited	
1946	Mysto Fox	M.C.	Voice, uncredited	
1946	Silent Tweetment	Flippity	Voice, uncredited	
1947	Woody the Giant Killer	Buck Beaver	Voice, uncredited	
1947	Down the Drain	Cat	Voice, uncredited	
1947	Speaking of Animals: Ain't Nature Grand	Rabbit	Voice, uncredited	
1947	Speaking of Animals: Dog Crazy	Mr. Jackson the Dog, and the Goat	Voice, uncredited	
1948	Kiddie Koncert	Wally Walrus, Sniffs, "That's my boy", "Food!!"	Voice, uncredited	
1948	Playful Pelican	Andy Panda (whistling), Paddy Pelican, Baby Pelican	Voice, uncredited	
1949	Jerry's Diary	Uncle Dudley, Tom Cat		
1950	A Lady Without Passport	Clerk	Uncredited	
1951	Soldiers Three	Shopkeeper	Uncredited	
1952	Triplet Trouble	Tom Cat	Voice, uncredited	
1952	Push-Button Kitty	Tom Cat	Voice, uncredited	
1952	Cruise Cat	Tom Cat	Voice, uncredited	
1953	The Missing Mouse	Tom Cat	Voice, uncredited	
1953	Abbott and Costello Go to Mars	French Waiter	Uncredited	
1953	The Golden Blade	Magician	Uncredited, released posthumously	
1953	Two Little Indians	Tom's Coonskin Cap	Archive recording, uncredited released posthumously	
1953	The Three Little Pups	Cat Puppet	Archive recording from The Alley Cat, uncredited, released posthumously	
1954	Socko in Morocco	Legionnaire Sergeant	Voice, uncredited, released posthumously	

=== Radio ===
Year	Title	Role	Notes	Ref(s).
1946–1953	The Cisco Kid	Pancho		
