= Thea Vidale =

American comedian and actress (born 1956)

- Born: Thea R. Vidale; November 20, 1956 (age 69); Washington, D.C., United States
- Notable work: Thea
- Children: 4

Comedy career
- Years active: 1986–present
- Medium: Stand-up; television; film
- Genres: Black comedy; Blue comedy; observational comedy
- Subjects: Race relations; human sexuality; African-American culture

Thea R. Vidale (born November 20, 1956) is an American stand-up comedian and actress. Vidale is perhaps best known for her role as Thea Armstrong-Turrell in the ABC sitcom Thea, which originally aired from 1993 until 1994. Vidale is noted as the first African American female comedian to have a television series named after her.

== Early life and education ==
Vidale was born in Washington, D.C. into a military family with three sisters and moved around frequently. Her family moved to Victoria, Texas when she was 12 years old. She graduated from Victoria High School in 1975 or 1976. After high school, Vidale worked as a waitress in Pasadena, Texas before friends encouraged her to be a comedian.

== Career ==
Vidale began her career in 1986 performing at amateur stand-up comedy nights in Houston before quickly progressing to comedy clubs in Washington, D.C., New York City, and Los Angeles. She appeared in the cable comedy special Rodney Dangerfield: Opening Night at Rodney's Place on HBO in 1989. On the same special were such notables as Tim Allen, Jeff Foxworthy, and Sam Kinison. She performed on Late Night with David Letterman and toured internationally. Vidale's most prominent featured role on a TV series was as the title character, a single mother, on the short-lived 1993 sitcom Thea. The show lasted only one season in which it was noted to be "ranked near 50 out of approximately 75 shows in the weekly Nielsen ratings" Nevertheless, she was nominated for a People's Choice Award as Favorite Female in a New Series. She was regularly a judge on the BET comedy competition TV series Comic View. She has performed on numerous sitcoms, including Ellen, The Wayans Bros., The Drew Carey Show, and My Wife and Kids. Vidale made a guest appearance, playing a hairdresser, in the episode "Queens for a Day" (2007) of the television series Ugly Betty. That same year, she played the part of Helen's grandmother on the Drake & Josh episode "Really Big Shrimp". Vidale provided the voice of Mammy Two-Shoes in re-dubbed versions of 19 Tom and Jerry cartoons from 1989 to 2001. She has performed in feature films such as 1995's Dr. Jekyll and Ms. Hyde, Jerry Springer's Ringmaster in 1998, and the 2006 Master P comedy Repos.

=== Later stand-up career ===
Her national comedy tour in 1999 was titled Thea Vidale, Down & Dirty. In 2007, she competed on the reality television show Last Comic Standing, making it to the second round. In 2009, Vidale was part of the Hot Tamales Live! presented by Kiki Melendez comedy tour, which was filmed for Showtime. On December 12, 2012, she appeared on Standup in Stilettos, a standup comedy show on the TV Guide Network. She performed on the third and seventh episode of the first season of the Gabriel Iglesias stand-up series Stand Up Revolution. In 2022 and 2024, Vidale worked with Carnival Cruise Lines as one of their comedians, and still works with Carnival cruises line as of April 3, 2025.

=== Other media appearances ===
In 1999, Vidale appeared at the Philadelphia LGBT Pride Fest, her first LGBT event, with comic Etta May. Both were honored by the city's mayor, who officially named the day simultaneously "Thea Vidale Day" and "Etta May Day". Vidale served as co-host for both the 2005 and 2009 AVN Awards.

=== Professional wrestling ===
Vidale performed on World Wrestling Entertainment (WWE) in 2006. She appeared as the mother to wrestler Shelton Benjamin, who had been going through difficulties in the preceding weeks. Her first appearance was on the January 2 episode of Raw. Over the next several weeks, "Momma Benjamin" was involved in several backstage skits resulting in her challenging wrestlers to matches on Shelton's behalf. Shelton won the majority of these matches, breaking his losing streak that existed before her arrival.

On the February 6, 2006, episode of RAW, Momma Benjamin attempted to interfere in Shelton's match with the Big Show, only to have the Big Show turn to her and scream in her face. After he turned back to finish the match (which he won), Momma Benjamin fainted to the ground, prompting EMTs to rush to her side and wheel her backstage. The official WWE website later announced that she was resting at home after suffering from a heart arrhythmia, which was what caused her to pass out. Momma Benjamin returned to Raw the next week, but with an oxygen tank attached to her wheelchair that started being used as a weapon, especially on the February 20 episode when she led Shelton to winning the WWE Intercontinental Championship, in the process turning them both heel. Momma Benjamin was mentioned for the final time on WWE television on March 13, with Shelton announcing to the crowd that she was having heart surgery, and had no plans to return to WWE.

== Personal life ==
Vidale has spoken often about her troubled marriage where she suffered physical abuse from her husband. She has four children from that marriage and later left the children with her ex-husband when she was touring. She has spoken frequently about her faith in God.

On October 21, 2010, Vidale was a guest on The Howard Stern Show, where she announced she had decided to have gastric bypass surgery because she had developed complications resulting from type 2 diabetes. She stated, "I have four children. This is not about vanity...I want it to be like a rebirth. A new me. A healthier me."

== Filmography ==
=== Film ===
Year	Title	Role	Notes
1988	Comedy's Dirtiest Dozen	—N/a	Documentary
1995	Dr. Jekyll and Ms. Hyde	Valerie	
1998	Ringmaster	Juanita	
2000	Punks	Nurse	
2006	Repos	Coffee's Mama	Direct-to-video
2009	Why We Laugh: Black Comedians on Black Comedy	—N/a	Documentary
2011	Queen of Media	Salon Manager	
2013	Douglass U	Mrs. Windsor	
2013	Lineage	Louise	
2013	Scavenger Killers	Velma Rodriguez	
2015	Love Won't Let Me Wait	Aunt Willia Mae	

=== Television ===
Year	Title	Role	Notes
1990	...Where's Rodney?	Teacher	Television film
1993–1994	Thea	Thea Turrell	19 episodes
1994	Totally Bill Hicks	—N/a	Television film
1995	Ellen	Technician	Episode: "Two Mammograms and a Wedding"
1997	The Wayans Bros.	Big Mama	2 episodes
2001	The Drew Carey Show	Mimi's Double	Episode: "What's Wrong with This Episode IV"
2002	My Wife and Kids	Aunt Evelyn	Episode: "Get Out"
2003	Whoopi	Arbitrator	Episode: "The Fat and the Frivolous"
2004	Law & Order: Criminal Intent	Crystal Fergin	Episode: "Mad Hops"
2006	WWE Raw	Mama Benjamin	10 episodes
2006	Ugly Betty	Cholli	Episode: "Queens for a Day"
2006	WWE New Year's Revolution	Mama Benjamin	Television special
2006	Royal Rumble	Mama Benjamin	Television special
2007	Drake & Josh	Lula DuBois	Episode: "Really Big Shrimp"
