= Richard Bickenbach =

American animator (1907–1994)

- Born: Richard Frederick Bickenbach; August 9, 1907; Indiana, U.S.
- Died: June 28, 1994 (aged 86); San Bernardino, California, U.S.
- Other name: Dick Bickenbach
- Occupations: Animator, layout artist, voice actor
- Years active: 1930–1987
- Employer(s): Animated Pictures (1930–1936); Walter Lantz Studio (1936–1937); MGM (1937–1939, 1946–1957); Leon Schlesinger Productions/Warner Bros. Cartoons (1939–1946); Hanna-Barbera (1957–1980)

Richard Frederick Bickenbach (August 9, 1907 – June 28, 1994) was an American animator who worked for Warner Bros. Cartoons and as a layout artist and character designer for MGM and Hanna-Barbera Productions. He worked on animation for many cartoons, and drew the art for several comic book adaptations of Hanna-Barbera's shows, including Yogi Bear and The Flintstones.

== Career ==
Bickenbach began his career as an animator for Ub Iwerks' Animated Pictures, the Metro-Goldwyn-Mayer cartoon department and Walter Lantz Productions until finally settling at Warner Bros. Pictures' cartoon division Leon Schlesinger Productions. He would animate the Looney Tunes and Merrie Melodies series for directors Ben Hardaway and Cal Dalton, Friz Freleng, Frank Tashlin, and Robert McKimson in a span of roughly eight years. He also provided his voice for a few cartoons, mostly portraying caricatures of Frank Sinatra.

He later left and moved back to MGM in 1946 to provided layouts for roughly eighty Tom and Jerry shorts during the decade he was there. When he moved to Hanna-Barbera, he was one of their first employees and he was there for two decades as an animator and layout artist. He had a large influence on Hanna-Barbera's early cartoon styles and was credited with creating the first official Yogi Bear model sheets. He was the recipient of the 1984 Motion Picture Screen Cartoonists Golden Award.
