= Ed Barge =

American animator (1910–1991)

- Born: Edward Jonathan Barge; August 29, 1910; Santa Clara, California, U.S.
- Died: September 29, 1991 (aged 81); Woodland Hills, California, U.S.
- Occupation: Animator
- Employer(s): Harman-Ising Productions (1928-1937); MGM (1937–1957); Hanna-Barbera Productions (1957–1984); Film Roman Productions (1984-1991)
- Spouse: Alice Davis (m. 1939)

Edward Jonathan "Ed" Barge (August 29, 1910 – September 29, 1991) was an American animator. He was best known for animating MGM's Tom and Jerry shorts.

== Early life and education ==
Barge was born to Alfred Edward and Margaret G. Barge in San Jose, California. In 1916, the family moved to Bakersfield, where his father was employed by the Santa Fe Railroad and Pacific Western Oil Co. before retiring in 1954. He was the second of six children; his brother Henry was a photographer for the Bakersfield Californian. Barge attended St. Francis Parochial School and high school in Bakersfield, where he was a baseball and basketball star. He was still living in Bakersfield in July 1936 and was becoming known for his landscape paintings. He married Alice Davis, the daughter of Mrs. B.A. Davis of Bakersfield, in Beverly Hills on April 6, 1939.

== Career ==
He began his career at Harman-Ising Productions, which shut down by August 1937 when Fred Quimby poached a number of its staff members to form the Metro-Goldwyn-Mayer cartoon department. Barge worked at MGM as an assistant animator and received his first screen credit as an animator on Innertube Antics, directed by George Gordon and released in January 1944. Gordon's unit had been disbanded the year before, at which point Barge was placed in the William Hanna/Joseph Barbera unit, then solely devoted to producing the Tom and Jerry cartoons; 1945's Mouse in Manhattan marks Barge's earliest credited work on the series. Barge subsequently remained at MGM for the next decade, eventually departing following production of the 1956 Tom and Jerry short Barbecue Brawl.

Hanna and Barbera opened their own studio that same year and hired Barge in 1957 for the movie The Man Called Flintstone. He remained with Hanna-Barbera until 1984, when he moved to work for Film Roman Productions, remaining until his death on September 29, 1991, at the age of 81.
