= Kenneth Muse =

American animator (1910–1987)

- Born: Kenneth Lee Muse; July 26, 1910; Charlotte, North Carolina, U.S.
- Died: July 26, 1987 (aged 77); Templeton, California, U.S.
- Occupation: Animator
- Employer(s): Walt Disney Productions (1939–1941); MGM Cartoons (1941–1957); Hanna-Barbera Productions (1957–1987); DePatie–Freleng Enterprises (1969–1974) 20th Century Fox (1992–1996)
- Known for: Animating Tom and Jerry cartoons and former Disney animator

Kenneth Lee Muse (July 26, 1910 – July 26, 1987) was an American animator, best known for his work on the Tom and Jerry series at MGM Cartoons.

== Biography ==
Muse worked briefly at Walt Disney Productions, where he was Preston Blair's assistant on Fantasia (he helped animate "The Sorcerer's Apprentice" scenes). He also provided animation for Pinocchio ("I've Got No Strings" sequence), Fantasia and various Mickey Mouse cartoons such as Mr. Mouse Takes a Trip (1940), Mickey's Birthday Party (1942) and Symphony Hour (1942). He was paid $22 a week to draw Mickey Mouse.

Muse left Disney following the 1941 strike there and joined MGM's animation department in 1941, along with fellow animators Preston Blair, Ed Love, Walter Clinton, Claude Smith, and Berny Wolf. He was assigned to the Hanna – Barbera unit, where he remained for 17 years. He first provided animation for the eighth Tom and Jerry short, Fine Feathered Friend (1942), and would remain an animator on the series until its final Hanna-Barbera-directed entry, Tot Watchers, in 1958. Muse also animated Jerry Mouse dancing with a live-action Gene Kelly in the 1945 musical Anchors Aweigh, with Ray Patterson and Ed Barge (and became archive footage as Jerry's visible in Family Guy episode, "Road to Rupert").

The only Tom and Jerry short that Muse didn't work on was Little School Mouse (1954). The reason for this was because he very briefly worked for fellow MGM employee Gene Hazelton on a short called Mr. Winkle Returns (1954) with Irven Spence, before moving back to MGM.

When MGM closed their animation studio in 1957, Muse joined his former bosses at their new company, Hanna-Barbera. He was one of the most prolific animators working for Hanna-Barbera's classic period of the late 1950s and early 1960s. He animated many important shows and sequences, including all of the short pilot The Flagstones, from which The Flintstones series was sold, as well as the original opening and closing titles of the series (the instrumental "Rise and Shine" titles, seen in the first two seasons, rather than the later, more familiar "Meet the Flintstones" titles). Muse also animated all of the first-produced episode of the series, "The Swimming Pool" (during the first season, episodes were assigned to one animator, who had only about four weeks each to complete them). Other early episodes animated entirely by Muse include "Hot Lips Hannigan","No Help Wanted", "The Monster From The Tar Pits", and "The Tycoon" (the J.L. Gotrocks episode). Muse also animated the opening and closing titles for Top Cat (1961). Aside from a sojourn at DePatie-Freleng Enterprises, he provided animation for nearly all of Hanna-Barbera's animated television series over a period of three decades, including The Huckleberry Hound Show (1958), The Yogi Bear Show (1961), Top Cat (1961), The Jetsons (1962), Wacky Races (1968), Hong Kong Phooey (1974), Jabberjaw (1976), and Challenge of the Superfriends (1978).

Muse was the stepfather of singer-songwriter Judee Sill, with whom he had a strained relationship.

== Death ==
Muse died on July 26, 1987, his 77th birthday, in Templeton, California.
