= List of Tom and Jerry characters =

This article contains the list of characters featured in the Tom and Jerry animated series, given in the order of the era in which they first appeared.

== Main ==
=== Tom and Jerry ===
Thomas "Tom" (originally called "Jasper") is a bluish grey and white domestic shorthair cat. He is usually, but not always, portrayed as living a comfortable and pampered life, while Gerald "Jerry" (originally called "Jinx"), a brown house mouse, always lives in close proximity to Tom. Despite being very energetic, determined, and much larger, Tom is no match for Jerry's wits. Jerry also possesses surprising strength for his size, sometimes even greater than Tom's, being able to lift items such as anvils with relative ease, and withstand big impacts. Although cats usually chase mice to eat them, it is quite rare for Tom to actually try to eat Jerry. Instead, he tends to compete with Jerry to taunt him (even as revenge) or to obtain a reward from a human (including his owner(s) or master(s)) for catching him or for generally doing his job as a house cat well. By the final "fade-out" of each cartoon, Jerry usually gets the best of Tom.

However, on rare occasions Tom triumphs over Jerry. This usually happens when the latter pushes Tom a little too far, such as in The Million Dollar Cat, where Jerry learns that Tom will lose his newly acquired wealth if he harms any animal, "including mice." He then torments Tom a touch too much until he retaliates. In Timid Tabby, Tom's look-alike cousin pushes Jerry over the edge. Occasionally and ironically, there are times when they both lose, like when Jerry's final trap or attack on Tom backfires or he overlooks something, like in Filet Meow, where Jerry orders a shark from the pet store to scare Tom away from eating a goldfish, but finds himself entirely intimidated as well. They even occasionally end up as friends, although within this set of stories, the truce is often ruined by some last minute event. One story that has a friendly ending is Snowbody Loves Me.

Both characters display sadistic tendencies, usually taking pleasure in tormenting each other, although it is often in response to a triggering event. However, when one character appears to be in mortal danger from an unplanned situation, or due to actions by a third party, the other will develop a conscience and save him. Occasionally, the duo bonds over a mutual sentiment toward an unpleasant experience and ultimately, attacking each other is more of a game than serious. Multiple shorts show the two getting along with minimal difficulty and they are more than capable of teamwork when the situation calls for it, usually against a third party who manages to torture and humiliate them both. These partnerships are usually forgotten when an unexpected event happens, or when one character feels that the other is no longer necessary. This is the case in Posse Cat, when they agree that Jerry will allow himself to be caught if Tom agrees to share his reward dinner, but Tom then reneges. Other times, Tom does keep his promise to Jerry and the partnerships do not so quickly dissolve after a solution to the problem is found.

== Hanna-Barbera era (1940–1958, 2000–2005) ==
The following characters were introduced in the theatrical shorts that were directed by William Hanna and Joseph Barbera.

=== Spike and Tyke ===
Spike, occasionally referred to as Butch or Killer, is a stern though occasionally dim-witted grey bulldog who is particularly disapproving of cats, but is gentle towards mice (though in his debut appearance, Dog Trouble (1942), Spike goes after both Tom and Jerry), and later, his son Tyke. In the shorts, Jerry would often try to get Tom in trouble with Spike so that the bulldog would beat him. Spike has a few weaknesses that Tom tries to capitalize upon: his possessiveness about his bone and his ticklishness. His first speaking role was in The Bodyguard (1944), where he was voiced by Billy Bletcher up until 1949, from which point he was voiced by other actors, including Patrick McGeehan, Jerry Mann, Bob Shamrock, John Brown, Fred Karbo, Stan Freberg, and Daws Butler. Spike is very protective towards his son and gets very angry at Tom if Tyke is bothered or harmed. After Daws Butler, Maurice LaMarche, Frank Welker, John DiMaggio, Michael Donovan, Phil LaMarr, Rick Zieff, and Bobby Cannavale would all perform Spike's voice. Unlike his father Spike, Tyke does not speak in Tom and Jerry or the 2014 TV series (aside from laughing in one short); he does speak in Tom and Jerry Kids, voiced by Patric Zimmerman.

=== Nibbles ===
Nibbles (also known as Tuffy) is a little, blue/gray, diaper-wearing orphan mouse who is close to Jerry and appears frequently with him, especially in the comics. His cartoon debut came in the short The Milky Waif (1946). Nibbles was later featured in the Academy Award-winning short The Little Orphan (1949).

He is sometimes seen as Jerry's nephew, but occasionally referred to as an orphan. Although these details are very inconclusive. Nibbles is often shown eating excessively as he is always hungry. In his first animated appearance, Tuffy was left on Jerry's doorstep, abandoned by his parents. Tom enjoys chasing Nibbles/Tuffy as much as he does Jerry.

Though the character was created as Tuffy for the comics in 1942, his early animated appearances from 1945 used the name Nibbles. During the 1950s and subsequently, the mouse was called Tuffy on-screen as well. In Tom and Jerry: The Magic Ring (2002), the name Nibbles was used again; and he was depicted as a pet-store mouse whom Jerry doesn't know.

In the Mouseketeer shorts, Nibbles speaks in French and English. He also is not Jerry's nephew; rather, he is the son of François Mouse—who does not make an appearance, but his name was given in two letters in the short Touché, Pussy Cat! (1954).

Like his guardian Jerry, Nibbles is often mistaken for a girl due to his extraordinarily high pitched voice. He was voiced by Francoise Brun-Cottan in the Mouseketeer shorts, Lucille Bliss in Robin Hoodwinked, Lou Scheimer and Frank Welker in The Tom and Jerry Comedy Show, Charlie Adler in Tom & Jerry Kids, Tara Strong in Tom and Jerry: The Magic Ring, Reece Thompson in Tom and Jerry Tales (season 1), Chantal Strand in Tom and Jerry: A Nutcracker Tale and Tom and Jerry Tales (season 2), Kath Soucie from 2010 onwards, and Alan Marriott in the video games Fists of Furry (2000) and War of the Whiskers (2002).

=== Butch ===
Butch
- First appearance: The Alley Cat (1941)
- Voiced by: Harry E. Lang (1941); William Hanna (1941, 1946–1948, 1950); Jack Mather (1943); Frank Graham (1946); Raul Martinez (1946); Jerry Mann (1951); Fred Karbo (1953); Daws Butler (1954–1955, 1957); Alan Marriott (2000); Marc Silk (2002); Maurice LaMarche (2002); Tony Cervone (2005); Colin Murdock (2006–2008); Joey D'Auria (2014–2022); Nicky Jam (2021)

In-universe information
- Species: Cat
- Gender: Male

Butch is a black alley cat who made his first appearance in the Tom and Jerry series in the short Baby Puss (1943), alongside Topsy and the already-established Meathead. His character, however (along with the character of Toodles Galore), first appeared in the MGM short (and Butch's only solo cartoon) The Alley Cat (1941), directed by Hugh Harman. Though unnamed in the short, he was referred to as "Tom" in a model sheet. Butch is the leader of the alley cat bullies who are usually friends with Tom and help him catch Jerry. In his first appearance, Baby Puss, Butch was an antagonist, tormenting Tom after Tom's young girl owner treated him like a baby—to the point of dressing Tom up in a diaper, a bonnet, and pink paw mittens. Thus costumed, Tom couldn't help, but be a figure of fun—both for Butch and his gang, and for Jerry. Butch also battles with Tom over Toodles Galore and her affections, creating a love triangle between him and Tom in a couple of shorts including the shorts, Springtime for Thomas (1946) and Casanova Cat (1951). In some cartoons, such as A Mouse in the House (1947), Butch battles with Tom to catch Jerry. Butch is usually portrayed as a homeless alley/street cat although in the short, Blue Cat Blues (1956), Butch is apparently a millionaire who wins the attention of Tom's love interest due to his immense wealth much to Tom's dismay. Butch also appears in a cartoon in the short-lived Spike and Tyke cartoon series, Scat Cats (1957), as a house cat owned by George and Joan, who in later installments of the original series own Tom. Butch briefly appears in Heavenly Puss (1949) as one of the cats trying to enter heaven, apparently having been killed in a fight with a dog (wearing bandages and with a full set of dog teeth clamped onto his tail).

He is voiced by Harry E. Lang in The Alley Cat, Jack Mather in Baby Puss, Frank Graham in Springtime for Thomas and Trap Happy (1946), Raul Martinez in Springtime for Thomas (singing voice), Jerry Mann in Casanova Cat, Fred Karbo in Life with Tom, Daws Butler in Baby Butch (1954), Smarty Cat (1955) and Scat Cats (1957), Alan Marriott in Tom and Jerry in Fists of Furry (video game, 2000), Marc Silk in Tom and Jerry in War of the Whiskers (video game, 2002), Maurice LaMarche in Tom and Jerry: The Magic Ring (2002), Tony Cervone in The Karate Guard (2005), Colin Murdock in Tom and Jerry Tales (2006–08), Joey D'Auria in The Tom and Jerry Show (2014–2021) and Tom and Jerry in New York (2021), and Nicky Jam in Tom & Jerry (2021).

=== Toodles Galore ===
Toodles Galore is an attractive white female cat, who usually wears a large blue bow around her neck, and is supposedly Tom's love interest, although Tom is a reputed playboy, and had other love interests before and after Toodles. Toodles is the only love interest who appeared more than twice. During the classic era, Tom had to compete twice against Butch and even once against Spike for Toodles's affection, and he lost them all. In Casanova Cat (1951), Toodles even fell in love once with Jerry.

Toodles is one of the more anthropomorphic animals in the early series, but her depiction varies by period. She never speaks and she rarely moves around. She has a feline main body, not a human one; however, details like whiskers come and go. She also has cat ears and nose. However, she has many human attributes. She sits in very human poses and walks on two feet (as does Tom in all but the very early shorts, where he chases Jerry on all fours). She has human-shaped hands with painted nails, and rather human eyes and lips made up as a human woman of the era might. In most appearances, like the other cats, she wears nothing but her fur, but she wears a bathing-suit in Salt Water Tabby (1947) with a human feminine figure.

Toodles appears in four episodes of Tom and Jerry Tales (2006–2008): "Joy Riding Jokers," "Spaced Out Cat," "Piranha Be Loved By You," "Abracadumb," and "Flamenco Fiasco," credited in the latter episode as "Senorita Cat" and voiced by Chantal Strand. In the later series, The Tom and Jerry Show (2014–2021), she makes cameo appearances in the episodes "Belly Achin'", "Cat Napped", "Don't Cut the Cheese", and "A Star Forlorn". She would later make a full appearance in the Season 4 episode "Tap Cat". She also appears in Tom and Jerry in New York, voiced by Rachael MacFarlane. A white cat similar in appearance to her appears in the 2021 film.

=== Mammy Two Shoes ===
Mammy Two Shoes (voiced by Lillian Randolph) is an African-American woman. Whether or not she is a maid taking care of the home in which Tom and Jerry reside or the homeowner is never made clear. Her face is never seen (with the exception of Saturday Evening Puss (1950), in which her face is very briefly seen as she runs towards the viewer), and she usually wallops the cat (whom she usually addresses as "Thomas") with a broom whenever he misbehaves. She sometimes tries to get rid of Jerry's presence in the house. Mammy would appear in 19 cartoons, starting with Puss Gets the Boot (1940) and ending with Push-Button Kitty (1952). She was voiced by Lillian Randolph in most of her appearances, with Anita Brown performing the role in The Mouse Comes to Dinner. The character eventually became controversial due to being based on the Mammy archetype, and was retired from the series in 1953. Gene Deitch opted not to use Mammy's character in his shorts, as he felt a "stereotypical black housekeeper" character "didn't work in a modern context." MGM Animation/Visual Arts, under the supervision of Chuck Jones, created replacement characters for Mammy in the Tom and Jerry cartoons featuring her for television. These versions used rotoscoping techniques to replace Mammy on-screen with a similarly stocky white woman (in most shorts) or a thin white woman (in Saturday Evening Puss); Randolph's voice on the soundtracks was replaced by an Irish-accented (or, in Puss, generic young adult) voice performed by actress June Foray. Three years after Turner Broadcasting System acquired Tom and Jerry, the cartoons featuring Mammy were edited again, with Lillian Randolph's voice replaced by that of Thea Vidale, who re-recorded the dialogue to remove Mammy's stereotype.

=== Quacker ===
Quacker
- First appearance: Little Quacker (1950)

In-universe information
- Species: Duck
- Gender: Male

Little Quacker is a duck and another recurring character in the series. He appears in Little Quacker (1950), Just Ducky (1953), Downhearted Duckling (1954), Southbound Duckling (1955), That's My Mommy (also 1955), Happy Go Ducky (1958), and The Vanishing Duck (1958). Quacker talks a lot compared to Tom and Jerry. His voice is a "duck voice" similar to Disney's Donald Duck. In many shorts, he is the only character who speaks. He is very trusting, even trusting Tom in many situations in which Tom wishes to eat him. He is a friend of Jerry, but unlike Jerry harbors no hard feelings towards Tom. In three cartoons, Quacker becomes separated from his mother at birth, only to reunite with her later in two of them (Little Quacker and Just Ducky). In That's My Mommy however, he is adopted by Tom. In Little Quacker, Quacker's father, Henry makes an appearance. Because his birth is shown differently in different cartoons, he may have siblings as seen in Just Ducky and Happy Go Ducky. Quacker also gets a girlfriend named Fifi in Downhearted Duckling. He appeared in The Tom and Jerry Show episode "The Lost Duckling" (1975). Quacker was used as a template for the Hanna-Barbera character Yakky Doodle, who made guest appearances in several Hanna-Barbera TV shows before starring in his own series of shorts on The Yogi Bear Show. In 1995, he was used as a template for the character Hard Luck Duck in the short of the same name in What a Cartoon!, voiced by Russi Taylor.

He was voiced by Red Coffey in the classic shorts, Don Messick in The Tom and Jerry Show (1975), Alan Marriott in Tom and Jerry in Fists of Furry and Tom and Jerry in War of the Whiskers (he was named "Duckling" in those games), and Sam Kwasman in The Tom and Jerry Show (2014) and Tom and Jerry in New York.

=== Cuckoo ===
Cuckoo is a canary that first appeared in Kitty Foiled (1948). He also appeared in The Flying Cat (1952), Life with Tom (1953), Hic-cup Pup (1954), Two Little Indians (where he is red in color), and Matinee Mouse (which reuses clips from the previous episodes). He is Jerry's best friend. Despite being a little bird, he can actually carry heavy objects like a bowling ball in Kitty Foiled and a 2000 lb. weight in The Flying Cat.

=== Lightning ===
Lightning
- First appearance: Old Rockin' Chair Tom (1948)
- Voiced by: Paul Frees (1951); Daws Butler (1957); Manuel Paris (1957); Mel Blanc (1966); William Hanna (archive voice) (2016-2019); Joey Wells (2021); Stephen Stanton (2021-present)

In-universe information
- Species: Cat
- Gender: Male

Lightning is a ginger orange cat who first appeared in the short Old Rockin' Chair Tom (1948) as Tom's rival. Lightning is named as such because in his first short, he practically moved at the speed of lightning. In later cartoons, Lightning often appeared as one of Tom's alley cat buddies/rivals. Lightning has the same character design as Butch, but with an orange color (although his tone of his coloring and even his design occasionally varies from film-to-film). In Mucho Mouse, he speaks Spanish and is a house cat. He also appears in the Gene Deitch short Switchin' Kitten. In the Chuck Jones short Catty-Cornered (his final appearance), Lightning is portrayed with more of an orange-yellow color than before, with the additional changes of a black tail and ears. Lightning also appears in the live action film where he is voiced by Joey Wells.

=== Topsy ===
Topsy
- First appearance: Baby Puss (1943)
- Voiced by: Harry E. Lang (1943); Fred Karbo (1953); Michael Donovan (2007); Harry Ratchford (2021)

In-universe information
- Species: Cat
- Gender: Male

Topsy is a grey/brown Scottish Fold kitten. He is one of Tom's alley cat friends/foes, although in Professor Tom he befriends Jerry. He first appeared in Baby Puss; his final appearance in the original theatrical shorts was in Scat Cats. He also appears in Tom and Jerry Tales with a more yellowish color (similar to Life with Tom). In Professor Tom, Topsy is explicitly a house cat; more often (as in Saturday Evening Puss and elsewhere), he is depicted as an alley cat or a cat of unknown origin. In the live action film, Topsy is voiced by Harry Ratchford.

=== Meathead ===
Meathead
- First appearance: Sufferin' Cats! (1943)
- Voiced by: William Hanna (vocal sounds); Harry E. Lang (1943); Jack Mather (1943); Fred Karbo (1953); Colin Murdock (2007); Dave B. Mitchell (2014); Joey D'Auria (2014); Rick Zieff (2016–present); Na'im Lynn (2021)

In-universe information
- Species: Cat
- Gender: Male

Meathead is a brown, mangy alley cat who wears a red toupee (which is occasionally seen the same color as the rest of his fur). He is generally portrayed as dull-witted and first appeared in the short, Sufferin' Cats! (1943), as Tom's rival. He also appears in Baby Puss and additional shorts as one of Tom's alley cat buddies/foes. He is known as Frankie in Heavenly Puss. In Scat Cats, his final appearance in the original theatrical shorts, he is portrayed with an all-gray color.

Meathead appears in several episodes of Tom and Jerry Tales with an orange color similar to that of Lightning and also has a red nose and, in two episodes, a bushy tail. He re-appeared in The Tom and Jerry Show episode "Cruisin' for a Bruisin'" as a lead antagonist, while a drag version of the character named "Meathelda" appeared in the episode "Hop to It!". Meathead also makes multiple appearances in later seasons, usually alongside Butch and other alley cats. He appears in the live action film, voiced by Na'im Lynn.

=== George and Joan ===
George and Joan (voiced by Daws Butler (1954–1957; George) and Richard Anderson (1958; George) and June Foray (1954–1956; Joan), Julie Bennett (1956–1958; Joan), Pilar Arcos (1957; Joan) and Perry Sheehan (1958; Joan), respectively) are an average middle-class white couple, who debuted in the short Pet Peeve (1954), replacing Mammy Two Shoes. They are the owners of Tom, Jerry, and Spike, but Tom likes to keep Joan company and Spike likes to keep George company. Joan is often seen either cooking or sitting on her armchair knitting or sewing a dress with Tom keeping her company. George, on the other hand, hates the monthly bills and complains that they're too expensive. But when he's not complaining about the bills, he is sitting in his armchair or on the sofa reading the newspaper wearing his smart purple or grey suit and Spike is keeping him company. Both George and Joan are very kind and polite towards each other and Tom and Spike. In Pet Peeve, George and Joan decided to keep Jerry as a pet because he is easy to look after and doesn't eat too much and tell Tom and Spike to leave. However, in later shorts with George and Joan, Tom and Spike still happily live with them and Jerry is not a pet.

George and Joan also appeared in three other Tom and Jerry shorts: Tom's Photo Finish, Busy Buddies, and The Vanishing Duck (Quacker's last short), and one Spike and Tyke short, Scat Cats.

In some shorts, Joan appears without George, such as Mouse for Sale, The Flying Sorceress, Mucho Mouse, and Tot Watchers. It could be presumed that George would be working at his office during the settings of these cartoons.

=== Jeannie and the Baby ===
Jeannie, the babysitter of George and Joan's baby, is an average teenager who spends much of her time talking on the phone. She is often called on to look after the baby if they're going out. Jeannie proceeds to leap straight onto the phone just as George and Joan shut the front door, which implies that she is very negligent about her job. Despite this, Jeannie is very kind, friendly, cheerful, and rarely loses a smile—except to scold Tom for "bothering the baby", which she thinks that he and Jerry are doing on purpose to annoy her. Jeannie and the baby were seen in only two cartoons: Busy Buddies (1956) and Tot Watchers (1958). Jeannie is voiced by Janet Waldo in the original shorts. The baby also appears in Tom & Jerry Kids, where the babysitter is slightly younger and a redhead instead of a blonde. Due to modern sensibilities, this negligent-based climax would no longer be replicated in the newer entrees since her neglect became a very serious matter.

A handful of teenage babysitters do the similar climax as Jeannie's on The Flintstones.

=== The Ants ===
The Ants are an army of red ants who steal food as they see them. They appeared in four cartoons Cat Napping, Pup on a Picnic, Barbecue Brawl, and Carmen Get It!. They also appeared in Tom & Jerry Kids. They are unusually heavy for their size, and their combined weight often causes many items, such as Tom's hammock, to break. It is unclear how or why the ants are so heavy, as they are even capable of making tables and diving boards shake as they march onto them.

=== Guardian devils ===
Each guardian devil for Tom and Jerry appeared in three cartoons Sufferin' Cats! (1943), Springtime for Thomas (1946), and Smitten Kitten (1952). In the first of these cartoons, one served as evil conscience for Tom and in the other one for Jerry.

=== Goldfish ===
A tiny goldfish who lives in the same house as Tom and Jerry. She appeared in first debuts in The Little Goldfish (1939) by Rudolf Ising. Later, major roles in Jerry and the Goldfish (1951) and Filet Meow (1966) (although the goldfish in the latter could be a different one), where Tom's attempts to eat her lead to Jerry winning her affections. She mostly appeared in cameo roles in other cartoons Puss Gets the Boot (1940), Puss n' Toots (1942), Baby Puss (1943), The Million Dollar Cat (1944), Casanova Cat (1951), The Missing Mouse (1953), Haunted Mouse (1965), and The Brothers Carry-Mouse-Off (1965).

=== Muscles ===
Muscles is Jerry's cousin and a mouse with incredible strength. In Jerry's Cousin (1951), Muscles appears to hate cats, including Tom. In Haunted Mouse, another mouse named Merlin, who is also a cousin of Jerry's, appears as a wizard with magical abilities. Muscles' other appearance was in Tom and Jerry: The Magic Ring, however, his name was changed to Freddie and he was hostile towards Jerry (although it could be a different mouse who is identical to Muscles). He was voiced by Paul Frees in Jerry's Cousin and by Billy West in Tom and Jerry: The Magic Ring. He also appeared in The Tom and Jerry Show.

=== George the Cat ===
George is the cat counterpart of Muscles, but with a personality that is in stark contrast to him. Like Muscles, George is identical to Tom (although he is shorter) and is his cousin. Unlike Muscles, however, George is a coward and is scared of mice. He first appeared at the beginning of Jerry's Cousin where he gets thrashed by Muscles (possibly the reason for his fear of mice). His bigger role was in Timid Tabby (1957) where he finally overcomes his fear. He also appeared in Tom & Jerry Kids, the early 1990s television series, where his fear seems to have re-instated even though he pretended it had not (his name was changed to Tim in that short). He is voiced by Bill Thompson.

=== Fluff, Muff, and Puff ===
Fluff, Muff, and Puff are a trio of brown, black, and orange kittens that first featured in Heavenly Puss (1949) in a cameo appearance (during Tom's dream) as charming kittens who drowned. They also appeared as cute but mischievous kittens in Triplet Trouble (1952). They also appeared on The Tom and Jerry Show.

=== Chérie ===
Chérie is a brown/grey female mouse who serves as Jerry's love interest. She first appeared at the end of Springtime for Thomas (1946), and then later in Smitten Kitten (1952), Touché, Pussy Cat! (1954, the only cartoon where she has an identical twin), Tom and Chérie (1955, the first cartoon where she is named, but only seen in silhouette form) and The Mouse from H.U.N.G.E.R. (1967, as a ticking time bomb set by Tom).

=== Toots ===
Toots is the name given to three different characters that have appeared infrequently. The first of these is a fluffy beige cat who appears in Puss n' Toots (1942) and in The Mouse Comes to Dinner (1945), the latter being her only speaking role. She also has a cameo in The Bodyguard (1944) and Smitten Kitten (1952). This version of Toots also appeared in some 1940s Tom and Jerry comics, and in The Tom and Jerry Show (2014–2021), mistakenly credited as "Toodles" and voiced by Alicyn Packard. Toots is also a different cat by the same name who appears in The Zoot Cat (1944) and in the Tom and Jerry Tales episode "Kitty Cat Blues". She has occasionally and erroneously been referred to as "Sheikie", but this is actually Tom's nickname, as seen on a gift card in the cartoon. Finally, Toots is the name of a mouse who serves as Jerry's love interest in Blue Cat Blues (1956). Toots also appeared as an antagonist in Love Me, Love My Mouse (1966).

=== King of France ===
In some of the mouseketeer series of cartoons, Tom serves the king of France. This is an obvious reference to Louis XIV, who is shown as an extremely short-tempered and cruel monarch. In The Two Mouseketeers (1952), the king executes Tom while in Royal Cat Nap (1958), he orders for Tom's execution.

=== Mechano cat and Robot-Mouse ===
Mechano cat first appeared in Push Button Kitty (1952) as Tom's rival. Later, Mechano and Robot-Mouse are seen as a cat-like-robot and mouse-like-robot who serve Tom and Jerry (except at the end of Advance and Be Mechanized (1967), when they get revenge and switch roles with Tom and Jerry, as they control their minds and make them do the work) in the three Chuck Jones outer space cartoons O-Solar Meow, Guided Mouse-ille, and Advance and Be Mechanized (both 1967). Mechano's efforts to catch or trap Jerry or Robot-Mouse always backfire for Tom, except in Advance and Be Mechanized, when he succeeds to catch Robot-Mouse in the beginning. In Guided Mouse-ille, he can stand upright and have hands to use a gun to try and blast Jerry in his mobile tank. This backfired and left Mechano with a black face, while crying in frustration. He sneaks back and promptly shoots Tom, who attempts to shoot Mechano back for his insubordination. However, the shot came out on the wrong end and Tom faints leaving Mechano laughing himself silly. He also appeared in the Tom and Jerry Tales episode "Tin Cat of Tomorrow" (2006) where he is named Verminator 7000. Mechano (called "Robot Cat") also appeared as a fighter in the video game, War of the Whiskers (2002), and was voiced by Marc Silk.

=== The St. Bernard ===
The St. Bernard is a dog who first appeared in Puttin' on the Dog (1944) and then again in The A-Tom-Inable Snowman (1966). Unlike the other dogs in the franchise, he is not hostile to cats and on one occasion becomes Tom's medical aid. He also appeared in War Dogs and Little Cesario.

=== Eagle ===
Eagle is an eagle that tries to steal Jerry for food from Tom. He first appeared in Flirty Birdy, then in The Tom and Jerry Show episode "The Egg and Tom and Jerry" (1975, where he is female instead of male) and then again in Tom and Jerry Tales episode "Bend it like Thomas" (2007). Eagle also appeared as a playable character in the video game War of the Whiskers (2002), voiced by Marc Silk.

=== Lion ===
Lion is a lion that debuted in Slap Happy Lion (1947) by Tex Avery. He has switched from a tame one in Jerry and the Lion (1950), to a nervous one in The Tom and Jerry Show episode "The Hypochondriac Lion" (1975) to a monster in the Tom and Jerry Tales episode "You're Lion" (2007). He is also a playable character in Tom and Jerry in War of the Whiskers where he is voiced by Alan Marriott.

=== Baby Woodpecker ===
A baby woodpecker that first appeared in Hatch Up Your Troubles (1949) and its remake The Egg and Jerry (1956) where he could peck into virtually anything including Tom's stomach or his golf club in Tee for Two (1945). Baby Woodpecker and his Mama would re-appear by making cameo appearances in The Tom and Jerry Show which ran from 2014.

=== Uncle Pecos ===
Uncle Pecos is Jerry's cowboyish uncle who appears in Pecos Pest (1955). He was voiced by Shug Fisher. He is known to always play a guitar and wears a black cowboy hat that covers his eyes. He plucks each of Tom's whiskers off to replace broken strings on the guitar. Being from Texas, he is shown to be super strong and is also shown to have a stammer, especially while singing.

Uncle Pecos returned in the Tom and Jerry Tales episode "Cry Uncle" (2006), voiced by Scott McNeil. In the episode, he arrives at Tom and Jerry's house and annoys Tom and Jerry with his music. He later leaves with Auntie Spinner in the end of the episode. Uncle Pecos made his second return in The Tom and Jerry Show, voiced by Stephen Stanton. He appears in the episodes, "I Quit", "Uncle Pecos Rides Again" and "Cat-A-Tonic Mouse" (all 2018).

=== The Exterminators ===
A trio of cats colored black, brown and orange who offer 'extermination' services on demand. They first appeared in Jerry's Cousin and then again in Karate Guard, failing to live on their promise in each cartoon. Butch is the leader of the gang in the latter cartoon, but he appeared in this role alone in Trap Happy.

=== Radio ===
A radio with a male human voice that broadcasts music, cookery shows and warnings on escaped animals, bomb threats etc. In Jerry's Diary (1949), the radio is shown to be anthropomorphic (with the announcer's name as "Uncle Dudley") but this is not the case with other cartoons. The radio's announcements often cause troubles for Tom, as in Jerry and the Lion (1950), Little Runaway, (1952) The Missing Mouse (1953), and Down Beat Bear (1956), fear in Fraidy Cat (1942), embarrassment in Jerry's Diary (1949) and Life with Tom (1953) or as in Jerry and the Goldfish (1951) may be the cause of evil intentions.

The radio was voiced by Martha Wentworth in Fraidy Cat, Jerry Mann in The Zoot Cat and Life with Tom, Harry E. Lang in Jerry's Diary, Frank Graham in Jerry and the Lion, Daws Butler in Jerry and the Goldfish and Down Beat Bear, and Paul Frees in The Missing Mouse and Down Beat Bear.

=== Jackass ===
Unlike the other Tom and Jerry characters, this one is not a character per se, but rather a substitution for a character, such as Spike the Bulldog, for a brief visual gag. Usually, a character turns into a jackass when it is fooled such as Spike in Solid Serenade (1946), The Framed Cat (1950), and Pet Peeve (1954) or Tom in Polka-Dot Puss (1949). In Pup on a Picnic (1955), 'Jackass' is replaced with 'Sucker'.

== Gene Deitch era (1961–1962) ==
The following characters were introduced in the theatrical shorts that were directed by Gene Deitch in the early 1960s.

=== The Grumpy Owner ===
An overweight, short-tempered, average height, middle-aged, and bald white man became Tom's owner only in three of the thirteen cartoons: Down and Outing (1961), High Steaks (1962), and Sorry Safari (also 1962). Unlike any of the other owners and like Spike, he has severe anger issues and is repeatedly violent toward Tom for his actions. He is voiced by Allen Swift.

The Grumpy Owner bears a strong resemblance to another character created by Deitch: Clint Clobber (also voiced by Swift), the property manager of a rundown apartment building who had been created for Terrytoons in the mid to late 1950s. There is some debate as to whether the Owner and Clobber were the same character; however, Deitch claimed they were in fact different characters.

=== Mad Scientist ===
He is a mad scientist reminiscent of Frankenstein. He first appeared in Switchin' Kitten (1961) and subsequently was the subject of a number of television episodes (e.g. 'Trojan Dog' in The Tom and Jerry Comedy Show, 1980–82) and movies thereafter. In his first appearance, the mad scientist is the owner of Jerry (who is also his assistant) and has numerous cats trapped in a prison. When Jerry picks an orange cat named Lightning, the other cats flee in terror as the scientist pulls him out for his latest experiment. He switches the mind of the orange cat with that of a bulldog and presents him as his present to Jerry.

=== Thin Lady ===
An unnamed thin white lady was Tom's owner in Buddies Thicker Than Water (1962). Chuck Jones would also use her in The Unshrinkable Jerry Mouse (1964) and in the revised version of Saturday Evening Puss. She also appeared in the movie Tom and Jerry: The Fast and the Furry (2005). Like many other early owners, her face was never shown.

== Chuck Jones era (1963–1967) ==
The following characters were introduced in the theatrical shorts that were produced by Chuck Jones in the mid to late-1960s.

=== Tiny Bulldog ===
This nameless mouse-sized bulldog, designed similarly to Spike the Bulldog, is Jerry's pet dog companion in only two shorts: The Cat's Me-Ouch (1965) and Purr-Chance to Dream (1967). His role is similar to Spike in cartoons such as The Bodyguard (1944), Fit To Be Tied (1952), and Much Ado About Mousing (1964), which is to defend Jerry against Tom. He is presumably the oldest son of Spike before Tyke, and this could be identified by his looks and personality that is similar to his father Spike. Unlike Spike and Tyke, he has a big bite (similar to those of Looney Tunes' Tasmanian Devil).

=== Shark ===
A shark who tries to eat Tom and Jerry. He appears in Puss 'n' Boats and Filet Meow (both 1966) and Surf-Bored Cat and Cannery Rodent (both 1967). The creature's color and species varies, in Cannery Rodent and Surf-Bored Cat it is a blue shark, while in Filet Meow and Puss 'n' Boats it is a great white shark.

== The Tom and Jerry Show (1975) ==
The following characters were introduced in The Tom and Jerry Show television series which ran for the first half of the 1975 season.

=== Broke ===
A gopher that devours vegetables, who appears in Gopher Broke and The Son of Gopher Broke.

=== Robin Ho Ho and His Merry Men ===
A parody of Robin Hood and His Merry Men, they appeared in Robin Ho Ho. They also appeared in Tom and Jerry: Robin Hood and His Merry Mouse (2012).

=== Sheriff of Nottingham ===
The primary antagonist in Robin Ho Ho and also in Tom and Jerry: Robin Hood and His Merry Mouse. He is based on the character from the Robin Hood tales.

=== Yvonne Jockalong ===
Love interest to both Tom and Jerry, she appears in The Ski Bunny and The Tennis Menace.

=== Sergeant Farce ===
A police officer who appears in See Dr. Jackal and Hide and in The Police Kitten where he is the superior officer to both Tom and Jerry.

== The Tom and Jerry Comedy Show (1980 series) ==
The following characters were introduced in the television series The Tom and Jerry Comedy Show.

=== Droopy ===
A Basset Hound often with a miserable look on his face, originally introduced in the Tex Avery shorts of the 1940s. He first made a poster cameo in Matinee Mouse (1966) in the Chuck Jones era. He also appeared in the Droopy and Dripple segments of Tom and Jerry Kids. He is sometimes an adversary of Spike. He would also appear in Tom and Jerry Tales and would appear in the direct-to-video films.

=== Barney Bear ===
An anthropomorphic cartoon character, a sluggish, sleepy bear who often is in pursuit of nothing, but peace and quiet, originally introduced in the Harman-Ising shorts of the 1930s. He would also appear in the direct-to-video films.

=== McWolf ===
McWolf, initially named "Slick Wolf" is the villain of the "Droopy and Dripple" segments. A bad and cruel wolf whose only mission is to ruin the life of Droopy (and Dripple and sometimes to remain with Miss Vavoom in Tom & Jerry Kids). McWolf sometimes appears as a crazy scientist whom loves to try and dominate the world, as a space villain, or a criminal fat person (known as "The Chubby Man"), etc. His character is based on the wolf in Red Hot Riding Hood. He is voiced by Frank Welker.

== Tom & Jerry Kids (1990–92) ==
The following characters were introduced in the television series Tom & Jerry Kids.

=== Dripple ===
Dripple is the son of Droopy, essentially an older version of the infant pup from Homesteader Droopy (1954). He is always with his father and they always do the same (although sometimes Dripple thinks "better" than his father). The identity of his mother is never mentioned or even addressed, although, due to Droopy's frequent relationships with Miss Vavoom, it can be assumed that his mother is either dead or is divorced from Droopy with no visitation rights prior to the events of the series. He is voiced by Charlie Adler.

=== Miss Vavoom ===
The recurring woman of the show. She is very seductive and she always takes different hairdos. She always is conquered by Droopy and most of times is the greater target of McWolf. Sometimes, she is called Bubbles Vavoom, Ultra Vavoom, Sugar Vavoom, etc. Her character is based on Red from Red Hot Riding Hood (1943). She is voiced by Teresa Ganzel.

=== Calaboose Cal ===
A gold cat host of a demonstration and participation show. He is arrogant (sometimes), has a rancher accent, and is sometimes presented as an enemy to Tom. Purportedly inspired by legendary Southern California car dealer Cal Worthington. He is voiced by Phil Hartman.

=== Urfo ===
Urfo is a six-legged alien dog that frequently arrives on Earth and helps Jerry fend off Tom.. His owners often send people to retrieve him.

=== Clyde ===
Clyde is a fat cat who often causes problems for Tom despite trying to be friendly and helpful. He is voiced by Brian Cummings. He also appears (uncredited) in the live action film as one of the many alley cats in Butch's gang.

=== Kyle the Cat ===
A mangy orange cat that first appeared as the antagonist of Spike or Tyke. Voiced by Pat Fraley.

=== Bernie the Swallow ===
A medically challenged yellow swallow that is friends with Jerry in Hard to Swallow. He had a color change to blue in "Swallow the Swallow" and "Grab that Bird" as he is chased mostly by Clyde and Kyle. Voiced by David L. Lander.

=== Wild Mouse ===
A grayish-green, shaggy fanged mouse who occasionally replaces Jerry and outwits his foes. Like Tom and Jerry, Wild Mouse is voiced by Frank Welker. He first appears in the episode "Wildmouse" and is last seen in the episode "King Windmouse."

=== Moncy ===
A cougar who torments Spike and Tyke. He wants to eat Tyke's lunch (and Spike prevents him). He was voiced by Frank Welker.

=== Sheriff Potgut ===
The elderly sheriff of Hokey Finokey Swamp. He is arrogant, rude, and self-centered. He threatened to send Swampy back to the circus (which Swampy is aware of the fact that it promotes animal cruelty), throwing Swampy into tears. He also envies the map Swampy made to search for the hidden treasure. He appears in the episode "Cajun Gumbo" as the episode's main antagonist. Aside from the lone episode where he battled Swampy, the Sheriff and the Gator Brothers were also used as antagonists in an episode featuring Wild Mouse.

=== Gator Brothers ===
The Gator Brothers are Sheriff Potgut's henchmen. They appear in the episode "Cajun Gumbo" as antagonists and in another episode featuring Wild Mouse.

=== Stinky Jr. McWolf ===
Stinky Jr. is the son of McWolf who has the same personality as him.

=== Screwball Squirrel ===
Screwball Squirrel is based on the original Screwball "Screwy" Squirrel in 1944, but now his adventures take place in a public city park, as he messes with hot-headed park attendant Dweeble and his dumb guard dog, Rumpley. He was voiced by Charlie Adler. He would also appear in one direct-to-video film, Tom and Jerry's Giant Adventure, voiced by Paul Reubens. He would also make a cameo appearance in the Season 3 episode of The Tom and Jerry Show, "Kid Stuff".

=== Lightning Bolt the Super Squirrel ===
A squirrel superhero. He is a rather campy and flamboyant superhero who throws lightning bolts. He also speaks with a slight Minnesotan accent and appeared in the spin-off series Droopy, Master Detective. He was voiced by Charlie Adler.

== Tom and Jerry Tales (2006 series) ==
The following characters were introduced in the television series Tom and Jerry Tales.

=== Mauricio ===
Mauricio is a very amorous octopus gentleman who first appeared in the mainly live-action musical film Dangerous When Wet (1953) during a Tom and Jerry sequence with Esther Williams. He was voiced by Fernando Lamas. In the Tom and Jerry Tales episode "Octo Sauve", Tom encounters him, and he mistakes Tom for a mermaid. Mauricio wants to date Tom, and they end up getting lost in the sea. He is voiced by David Kaye.

=== Princess ===
The princess appears in Medieval Menace, where she kisses Tom, who has turned into a frog, thinking he is a prince transformed by a spell. She is voiced by Nicole Bouma.

=== Mrs. Two Shoes ===
Mrs. Two Shoes is a white woman with a personality and a name similar to Mammy Two Shoes. Several photos on a mantel in "Ho, Ho Horrors" imply that Mrs. Two Shoes has a family (a man and a boy, also shown only as legs and partial torsos). Mrs. Two Shoes is voiced by Nicole Oliver.

== The Tom and Jerry Show (2014 series) ==
The following characters were introduced in the 2014 television series Tom and Jerry Show.

=== Rick and Ginger ===
Rick (voiced by Jason Alexander and later Stephen Stanton) and Ginger (voiced by Grey DeLisle) are a middle-class couple. Rick is more sympathetic towards Spike while Ginger favors Tom. Their faces are never seen in the show, but their voices are featured.

=== Hamster ===
The Hamster is a small "anti-social, overachieving" hamster with light brown fur. He wears glasses and is the smartest hamster in the lab.

=== Bot ===
Bot is a robot that cleans the lab with its vacuum cleaner and control arm. It has a red screen that spots trash all over the lab and most often mistakes Tom as such out of its programming.

=== Beatie and Hildie ===
Beatie and Hildie are witch sisters who act as Tom and Jerry's medieval owners.

=== The Detective ===
The detective is a detective who is the owner of Tom (and presumably Jerry too). In his absence, Tom and Jerry work as sleuths themselves, in the process using his name and fame. He appeared in the first-season episodes, "Feline Fatale", "One of a Kind", "Haunted Mouse", "Sleuth or Consequences", "Poof!", "Bone Dry", "Cat Napped", and "Curse Case Scenario".

=== Dr. Bigby ===
Dr. Bigby is an eccentric scientist whose experiments don't always often go according to plan, he is also an owner of Jerry, Napoleon, Hamster and Bot.

=== Skid ===
Skid is an orange cat that was always the great leader and also always makes the election of the Top cat. Both Tom and Butch compete for the Golden Fez in the United Mouse Catchers when they both attempt to capture Jerry.

=== George and Junior ===
George and Junior are based on the original George and Junior from their only four shorts in the 1940s designed and directed by Tex Avery. They appear in the Season 4 episode of The Tom and Jerry Show, "Shadow of a Doubt".

== Tom and Jerry movies ==
The following recurring characters were introduced in the various Tom and Jerry movies.

=== Robyn Starling ===
Robyn Starling is a young girl whose father Tom and Jerry helped her to find in Tom and Jerry: The Movie. She is voiced by Anndi McAfee.

=== Biff Buzzard and Buzz Blister ===
Biff Buzzard and Buzz Blister are characters in Tom and Jerry: Blast Off to Mars and Tom and Jerry: The Fast and the Furry. In Tom and Jerry: The Fast and the Furry, they were news reporters. In Tom and Jerry: Blast Off to Mars, they were astronauts. Biff is voiced by Billy West and Buzz by Jess Harnell.

=== Blue Parrot Betty ===
Blue Parrot Betty is a pet parrot owned by Blue Pirate Bob in Tom and Jerry: Shiver Me Whiskers. She is voiced by the American actress, Kathy Najimy.

=== Tin, Pan, and Alley ===
Tin, Pan, and Alley are a trio of male Siamese cats created especially for the new direct-to-video films, they are secondary antagonists in Tom and Jerry Meet Sherlock Holmes, Tom and Jerry: Robin Hood and His Merry Mouse, Tom and Jerry's Giant Adventure, Tom and Jerry: The Lost Dragon, and Tom and Jerry: Spy Quest, acting as henchmen for the main antagonists. In their first appearance in Tom and Jerry Meet Sherlock Holmes, they are local gravediggers who work for Professor Moriarty. In Tom and Jerry: Robin Hood and His Merry Mouse, they worked as spies for Prince John. In Tom and Jerry: The Lost Dragon, they are the Hench-cats of Drizelda. In Tom and Jerry: Spy Quest, they are seen working for Doctor Zin. They also make an appearance in Tom and Jerry: Willy Wonka and the Chocolate Factory. They were named after the Warner Bros. 1943 short Tin Pan Alley Cats. Tin is voiced by Greg Ellis, Pan by Jess Harnell, and Alley by Richard McGonagle.

=== Butch (dog) ===
Butch (originally known as Spike, until renamed as Butch to avoid confusion with Spike from the Tom and Jerry cartoons) is the name of another bulldog from Tex Avery's shorts in the 1940s and 1950s. He was one of the main antagonists in Droopy shorts (although he was replaced by Hanna-Barbera's Spike in the 1980s) and also had a series of his own. He appears in a number of movies e.g. Tom and Jerry and the Wizard of Oz and Tom and Jerry: The Magic Ring.
