= Blue Cat Blues =

1956 film directed by William Hanna and Joseph Barbera

- The ending of the short featuring Tom and Jerry, both depressed and heartbroken on a railroad track.
- Directed by: William Hanna; Joseph Barbera
- Story by: William Hanna; Joseph Barbera
- Produced by: William Hanna; Joseph Barbera
- Starring: Paul Frees
- Narrated by: Paul Frees
- Music by: Scott Bradley
- Animation by: Kenneth Muse; Ed Barge; Irven Spence; Lewis Marshall
- Layouts by: Richard Bickenbach
- Backgrounds by: Robert Gentle
- Color process: Technicolor
- Production company: MGM cartoon studio
- Distributed by: Metro-Goldwyn-Mayer
- Release date: November 4, 1956; (earliest known date)
- Running time: 6:49
- Country: United States
- Language: English

Blue Cat Blues is a 1956 one-reel animated Tom and Jerry cartoon written, directed and produced by co-creators William Hanna and Joseph Barbera. The short was released by Metro-Goldwyn-Mayer on November 4, 1956 in CinemaScope. It is the series' 103rd entry.

Unusual for a Tom and Jerry cartoon, Jerry "speaks" through an inner monologue, voiced by Paul Frees.

== Plot ==
Tom is seen sitting on train tracks, heavily depressed and waiting for an oncoming train to come and run him over, while Jerry laments his friend's state and recalls how he ended up there. Jerry narrates that he and Tom were best friends before Tom falls for a beautiful white cat who, at first, seems to return his feelings (though she actually made it clear that she didn't love him, for example by shaping his face to look like a donkey) before leaving him for Butch (who, unlike in other cartoons, is extremely rich), revealing she is a gold digger, confirming Jerry's earlier suspicions.

Despite Jerry's protests, Tom desperately tries to buy back her love but is continually outdone by Butch. When Tom tries to present her with a flower, he finds she has already received a beautiful horseshoe garland of roses from Butch. He then presents her with a small bottle of perfume, but then Butch arrives with a large tanker truck full of perfume. Tom squanders all of his life savings to buy a diamond ring for her (with a diamond so small she needs a magnifying glass to see it), only to learn that Butch has already gifted her a ring with a large diamond so shiny that she and Tom need welding helmets to see it. He even takes out a predatory 26-year, 112% APR loan from a used car lot to buy her an old, rickety automobile, only for Butch to arrive in his long and fancy convertible, crushing Tom and his car.

Distraught, Tom starts drinking (milk) uncontrollably, ignoring Jerry's pleas, and eventually nearly goes down the literal gutter but is saved just in time by Jerry. Tom becomes even more depressed when Butch and the white cat drive by in Butch's car with a "JUST MARRIED" sign on the back. As the flashback ends, Jerry kisses a picture of his girlfriend before she drives past, having married a rich mouse and revealing that she is no better than the white cat. Heartbroken too, Jerry joins Tom on the tracks. The whistle of an approaching train grows louder as the cartoon fades out.

== Voice cast ==
- Paul Frees as The Narrator (Jerry's inner monologue)

== Reception ==
=== Critical response ===
In Cartoon Carnival: A Critical Guide to Best Cartoons, writer Michael Samerdyke said "Blue Cat Blues is deeply indebted to Tex Avery for its gags." Video Movie Guide: 1995 called the short (in a review for the aforementioned Festival of Fun VHS) said "among the worst Tom & Jerry outings".

=== Legacy ===
The short has gained a legacy in recent times for being 'dark' due to Tom's depression and blackly comic ending, often cited as shocking for a 'children's TV cartoon', despite the fact it was not made for TV or children. Animated theatrical shorts at the time were aimed at adults, which meant violence, sexual innuendo, political satire, and other adult themes, including depictions of alcohol and tobacco, were common.

Additionally, it is often misreported as the "final" short of the series due to its ending implying the deaths of Tom and Jerry. The final short by William Hanna and Joseph Barbera produced at Metro-Goldwyn-Mayer was Tot Watchers in 1958, and the final short overall was Purr-Chance to Dream, produced by Chuck Jones at MGM Animation/Visual Arts in 1967.

== Availability ==
- LaserDisc: The Art of Tom & Jerry Vol. 2, Disc Four
- VHS: Tom and Jerry: Festival of Fun (Note: Also available on iTunes.)
- DVD:
  - Tom and Jerry's Greatest Chases Vol. 3
  - Tom and Jerry Spotlight Collection Vol. 1, Disc Two
  - Tom and Jerry: The Classic Collection Vol. 4, Disc Two (Vol. 8 in Europe and Australia) (Europe 1995 Turner dubbed version and pan-and-scan edition)
  - Tom and Jerry: No Mice Allowed!
  - Tom and Jerry: The Golden Era Anthology
- Blu-ray:
  - Tom & Jerry: The Complete CinemaScope Collection
  - Tom and Jerry: The Golden Era Anthology
- iTunes:
  - Tom & Jerry and Friends Vol. 1
  - Tom and Jerry Vol. 1
  - Tom and Jerry: Wild Cats and Traps

Additionally, the soundtrack was officially released on the album Tom and Jerry & Tex Avery Too! in 2006.
