= Toodles =

Toodles may refer to:

- Toodles Galore, a female cat in the Tom and Jerry cartoons
- Toodles, a female shih-tzu dog, appearing periodically in the television program The New Normal
- Toodles, a fictional device from the Mickey Mouse Clubhouse children's series
- Toodles, a female Toad character from the video game Paper Mario: The Thousand-Year Door

== See also ==
- Tootles, one of Peter Pan's Lost Boys
