= The Alley Cat =

The Alley Cat may refer to:

- The Alley Cat (1929 film)
- The Alley Cat (1941 film)
- The Alley Cat (1985 film)
