= Tee for Two =

1945 animated short film

- Poster of Tee for Two
- Directed by: William Hanna; Joseph Barbera
- Story by: Joseph Barbera (uncredited)
- Produced by: Fred Quimby
- Starring: William Hanna (uncredited)
- Cinematography: Jack Stevens (uncredited)
- Edited by: Fred McAlpin (uncredited)
- Music by: Scott Bradley
- Animation by: Ray Patterson; Pete Burness; Irven Spence; Kenneth Muse
- Layouts by: Harvey Eisenberg (uncredited)
- Backgrounds by: Robert Gentle (uncredited)
- Color process: Technicolor
- Production company: MGM Cartoons
- Distributed by: Metro-Goldwyn-Mayer
- Release dates: July 21, 1945; February 14, 1953 (re-issue)
- Running time: 7:03
- Language: English

Tee for Two is a 1945 American one-reel Technicolor animated cartoon and is the 20th Tom and Jerry short, first released to theaters on July 21, 1945 and reissued on February 14, 1953 by Metro-Goldwyn-Mayer. The short was directed by William Hanna and Joseph Barbera, composed by Scott Bradley, and animated by Ray Patterson, Irven Spence, Pete Burness, and Kenneth Muse. Jack Stevens, Fred McAlpin, Harvey Eisenberg, and Robert Gentle, all uncredited, would function as the cinematographer, the editor, the layout artist, and the background artist respectively.

In the short, Tom wreaks havoc on a golf course, trying to play despite Jerry's interference. From hitting Jerry instead of the ball to being attacked by bees, Tom's attempts are met with comical failures. After a series of mishaps, including a humiliating encounter with a lawn mower, Tom is knocked out by Jerry's final swing. Tee for Two is noted for exceptional violence. This is apparent in the scene where Tom gets stung by a collection of bees.

== Plot ==
Jerry Mouse draws a pupil on a golf ball lodged in Tom Cat's eye, much to Tom's frustration.

In a game of golf, Tom, stuck inside an immense divot, repeatedly strikes the ball in a furious manner. After many strokes, the ball finally reaches the putting green. Tom tries to putt the ball inside the cup, but it is thwarted due to Jerry living in there. Despite Jerry's efforts to seek refuge, Tom catches him and uses him as a tee.

After Tom's numerous failed strokes, including getting his teeth smashed by a golf ball and a ball flying into a tree, Jerry replaces Tom's golf ball with an egg. Because of this, a baby woodpecker quickly hatches out of its egg after Tom's stroke and repeatedly pecks at Tom. After another false golf ball placed by Jerry, Tom, exasperated by Jerry's tricks, uses him as a golf ball and successfully blows him into the hole. In his scorecard, Tom writes that the number of strokes in that round was three. Jerry, knowing this is false, shames Tom, leading him to write his true score of 33 strokes. For the following hole, Jerry ties Tom's club to his tail using a rope, sending Tom flying into his target hole after his stroke. Jerry then putts the golf ball into Tom's throat, using the throat as the golf hole Tom is stuck in.

While chasing Jerry, Tom steps on a collection of golf clubs numerous times, causing the clubs to swing rapidly into Tom's face each time. A frustrated Tom uses a golf ball to bring a running Jerry back to him and proceeds to strike Jerry, and a small patch of grass under the ball, with his club. While airborne, Jerry drops the golf ball beneath him as a bomb, causing it to explode on Tom. Afterward, Jerry, still flying, falls into a tree, with Tom following him shortly after. Trying to hit Jerry, Tom repeatedly pokes the inside of the tree Jerry is in with a club, but Jerry takes the club and pokes at Tom back. To escape, Jerry places a beehive on Tom's head, leading to Tom getting chased by many bees. Tom gets cut by a lawn mower in an attempt to hide behind a bush. In order to seek sanctuary, Tom jumps into a lake, preventing the bees from further chasing him. Despite this, Jerry leads the bees to the snorkel, with the bees heading inside Tom's mouth, much to his shock. Jerry strikes a golf ball on Tom, running from the bees, causing him to fall over.

== Voice cast ==
- William Hanna as Tom and Jerry vocal effects (uncredited)

== Production ==
Bar sheet for scenes 54 to 57 in Tee for Two.

Tee for Two was directed by William Hanna and Joseph Barbera, who directed every Tom and Jerry short produced by the MGM Cartoon Studio. Fred Quimby produced the short, and the music score was done by Scott Bradley. The short is animated by Ray Patterson, Irven Spence, Pete Burness, and Kenneth Muse. Uncredited work was done by Jack Stevens, Fred McAlpin, Harvey Eisenberg, and Robert Gentle. They worked as the cinematographer, the editor, the layout artist, and the background artist respectively.

The co-directors of Tee for Two

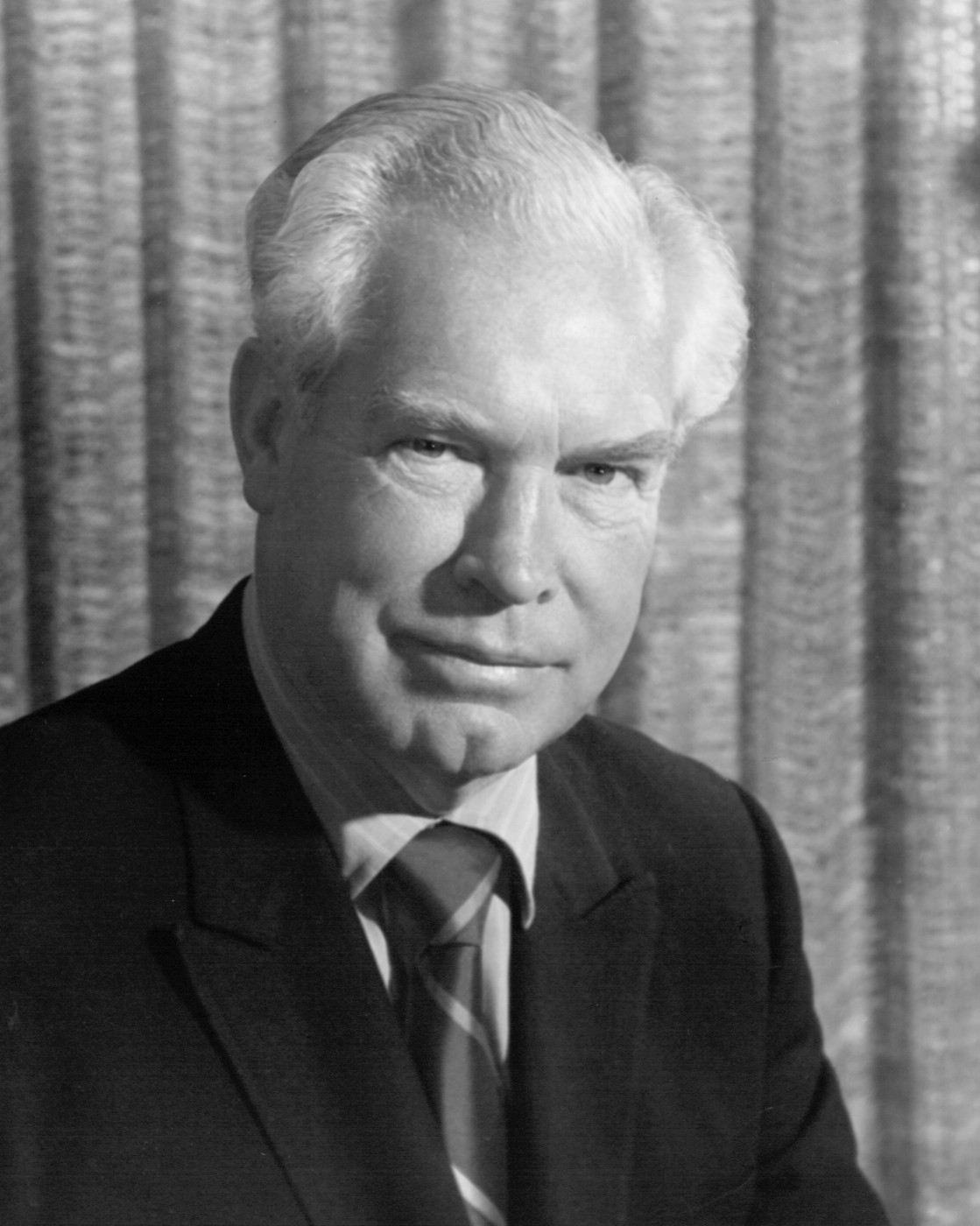
Co-director William Hanna worked on the timing for Tee for Two.

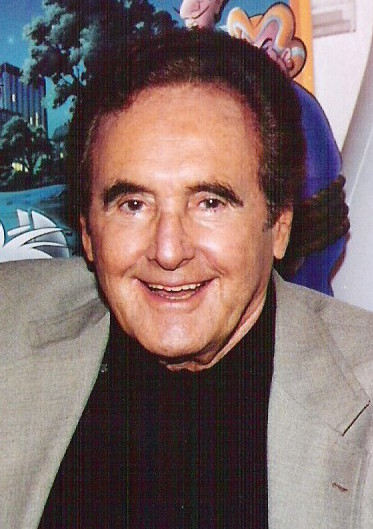
Co-director Joseph Barbera drew the storyboard for Tee for Two.

Tee for Two, along with Mouse in Manhattan, Quiet Please!, Springtime for Thomas, and Love Boids, which was later named Flirty Birdy before release, started its production in animation as early as May 20, 1944. Tee for Two had a production number of #126. Mouse in Manhattan was produced after Tee for Two with a production number of #132, but was released before the latter. This makes Tee for Two the 20th short in the Tom and Jerry film series to be released.

A found bar sheet of Tee for Two composed by Scott Bradley contains the music for scenes 54 to 57. The bar sheet contains actions and sound effects so Bradley could accurately compose the music with the action. The copyright for the Tee for Two motion picture photo-play was sent by Loew's Incorporated to the copyright office with it being received on July 25, 1945; four days after the short's release. Its registration number is L13396.

Tee for Two is considered to be the first Tom and Jerry cartoon to cast Tom as a "human" character rather than a house cat. Irven Spence, a former animator for Tex Avery at Leon Schlesinger Productions, animates the scene where Tom repeatedly strikes the ball while digging deeper into a hole. Kenneth Muse, a former animator for Disney, animates the following scene where Tom encounters Jerry, hitting Jerry with a golf ball while he was fleeing. Muse would often draw Tom with crossed whiskers. Animation historian Devon Baxter says that Muse's way of drawing Tom's whiskers makes Tom "look like a villain from a stage melodrama." Baxter would point out another thing about how Muse animated his characters:

"Another trait of Muse’s animation is in how he handles the entry of Tom or Jerry on-screen; their feet slip onto the ground before they come to a stop. Muse stressed a general flexibility in the characters’ movement—for instance, their bodies squash and stretch in his scenes."

Pete Burness animates the scenes where Tom uses Jerry as an assistant while playing golf. He would also animate the scene where Tom's teeth get shattered after his golf ball bounces back against a stone. According to Baxter, a "similar gag in 1948’s Kitty Foiled is depicted with sharper timing but is almost as unpleasant." Spence animates the following scenes where Jerry replaces Tom's golf ball with an egg, to which Tom hits. Ray Patterson's work begins in the scene where a woodpecker hatches out of its egg and torments Tom. Analyzing how Patterson animates, Baxter would state:

"Ray Patterson animates perhaps the finest acting in Tee for Two. Tom conveys an array of emotions when he scores his first hole, with a half-broken golf ball fastened on Jerry’s head."

Muse animates the following scene where Jerry ties a rope to connect Tom's tail and his club, which flings Tom after swinging it. After that, Burness animates Tom trying to poke Jerry, who is inside a tree, with a club. Spence animates Jerry placing a beehive on Tom's head, and Muse animates Tom fleeing from the tree. When Tom dives underwater to seek refuge from the bees, the animation is split between Spence, Muse, and Patterson. Burness animates the final scene of Tee for Two, where Jerry hits Tom with a golf ball; a callback to Jerry getting hit by a golf ball earlier in the film.

== Reception and release ==
Tee for Two was released by Metro-Goldwyn-Mayer on July 21, 1945, with it being reissued on February 14, 1953. Tee for Two is best remembered for its climactic scene involving Tom's strong reaction from a bee attack. Animator Mark Kausler has described Tom's reaction from the bee attack to be "the most terrifying drawing ([by the animator] Ken Muse) of Tom being stung... accompanied by the most anguished scream ever put on film." Animation historian and video editor Devon Baxter has also described Tom's scream to be "the largest and most gruesome reaction in the series to date".

Writer and historian Michael Samerdyke viewed the climactic scene as illustrative of the natural incorporation of Tex Avery's style of comedy into Hanna and Barbera's own animated shorts. However, animation historian Michael Barrier saw otherwise, and stated that "the sheer scale of Tom's reaction – so big it's preposterous–cancels out his pain." Ben Simon of Animated Views says that Tee for Two is "a golfing escapade in which Tom’s game is disrupted by a number of terrific gags perpetrated by a woodpecker, a swarm of bees…and Jerry, of course." Jerry's Diary, a compilation of previous Tom and Jerry cartoons, featured a clip of Tee for Two.

== Works cited ==
- Webb, Graham (2011). The Animated Film Encyclopedia: A Complete Guide to American Shorts, Features and Sequences, 1900-1999. McFarland & Company. ISBN 0786449853.
- Scott, Keith (2022). Cartoon Voices: of the Golden Age, 1930-1970 - Volume Two: Selected Filmographies with Voice Credits. Orlando: BearManor Media. ISBN 979-8-88771-010-5.
- Lenburg, Jeff (1999). The Encyclopedia of Animated Cartoons. Checkmark Books. ISBN 0-8160-3831-7.
- Samerdyke, Michael (August 28, 2014). Cartoon Carnival: A Critical Guide to the Best Cartoons from Warner Brothers, MGM, Walter Lantz and DePatie-Freleng. Lulu Press, Inc. ISBN 978-1-31-247007-1.
- Barrier, Michael (November 6, 2003). Hollywood Cartoons: American Animation in Its Golden Age. Oxford University Press. ISBN 978-0-19-516729-0.
- Adams, T.R. (1991). Tom and Jerry: Fifty Years of Cat and Mouse. Crescent Books. ISBN 185510086X.
- Annand, Jonathan (2025). Animation Craft For 3D and 2D Animators. CRC Press. ISBN 978-1032422404.
- Sandler, Kevin; Williams, Tyler (2024). Hanna and Barbera: Conversations. University Press of Mississippi. ISBN 9781496850454.
