= Trap Happy =

1946 film directed by William Hanna and Joseph Barbera

- Theatrical release poster
- Directed by: William Hanna; Joseph Barbera
- Produced by: Fred Quimby
- Starring: William Hanna
- Music by: Scott Bradley
- Animation by: Michael Lah; Kenneth Muse; Ed Barge; Uncredited animators: Al Grandmain (effects animation); Irven Spence (recycled animation from The Yankee Doodle Mouse; Pete Burness; Ray Patterson
- Color process: Technicolor
- Production company: MGM Cartoons
- Distributed by: Metro-Goldwyn-Mayer
- Release dates: June 29, 1946; March 27, 1954 (re-issue)
- Running time: 6:55
- Language: English

Trap Happy is a 1946 American one-reel animated cartoon and is the 25th Tom and Jerry short, it was released on June 29, 1946. It was produced by Fred Quimby, directed by William Hanna and Joseph Barbera, with the music score by Scott Bradley. The cartoon was animated by Michael Lah, Kenneth Muse, and Ed Barge, with uncredited work from Ray Patterson and Pete Burness. Recycled animation done by Irven Spence from The Yankee Doodle Mouse was used in the beginning of the short. The short was re-issued in March 27, 1954. The short was noted for its extreme violence and the quality of the animation.

== Plot ==
Tom, tired of being constantly outsmarted by Jerry while chasing him, looks through the yellow pages and finds a company called "Ajax Mouse Exterminators", and calls the company, to Jerry's dismay. The exterminator, Butch, comes quickly to Tom's house, paints a nut yellow, gives it an essence of cheese, and places it inside Jerry's mouse hole. This tricks Jerry as he eats the nut thinking that it's cheese. Butch then uses a magnet to pull Jerry out of his mouse hole and attempts to cut him with an axe, but Jerry moves Tom's tail to where Butch placed him, and Butch ends up cutting Tom's tail. Jerry then runs to another mouse hole, with Butch using a corkscrew to pin Jerry to a wall. Jerry uses electric wires to make the handle of the corkscrew spin, which causes the handle to repeatedly hit Butch.

After escaping his mouse hole Tom and Butch were gassing, Jerry runs into another mouse hole, with Tom and Butch lifting the wall Jerry is in. Jerry hits Tom's foot with him jumping out in pain, which makes the lifted wall slam on Butch's hand with Jerry playing "Yankee Doodle" on Butch's hand. Butch gives Tom a hammer and goes inside the wall Jerry is in to lure him out, but due to Butch popping his head out the mouse hole, Tom, without looking, hits Butch with a hammer by accident. Butch lights a bomb near Jerry's mouse hole, and Jerry throws the bomb back at him and the both of them, and Tom starts playing a game of hot potato with the bomb, which ends up with the bomb exploding on Butch and Tom. Tom and Butch accidentally grabs each others hand as they were trying to catch Jerry inside the mouse hole, and they pull each other thinking that they have Jerry.

Tom ends up pulling Butch out, breaking the wall while doing so, and an infuriated Butch pulls out a shotgun and starts shooting Tom.

== Production ==
- Directed by: William Hanna and Joseph Barbera
- Story: William Hanna and Joseph Barbera
- Animation: Michael Lah, Kenneth Muse, Ed Barge, Ray Patterson (uncredited), Pete Burness (uncredited), Irven Spence (recycled animation from The Yankee Doodle Mouse, uncredited)
- Music: Scott Bradley
- Produced by: Fred Quimby

=== Animation ===
Animation done by Irven Spence from The Yankee Doodle Mouse was reused when Tom was chasing Jerry down the stairs. Ed Barge animates the following sequence until Tom opens the door for Butch, which was done by Kenneth Muse. After that, Muse animated until the scene where Jerry runs to a mouse hole after Butch cuts Tom's tail by accident, which was animated by Michael Lah, he animated until Ray Patterson's scene where Tom and Butch lifts the wall in attempt to catch Jerry. Patterson animates until the scene where Butch runs into the wall Jerry was in, which was animated by Muse. Lah animates the sequence where Tom, Butch, and Jerry plays hot potato with a bomb, and Pete Burness animates the scene where Tom and Butch try to pull each other out thinking that they've captured Jerry. Patterson animated the rest, starting with Tom jumping out of the window while running through the window.

== Reception ==
Rodney Figueiredo of Animated Views stated that "(t)he ending to this short is priceless and very funny", as "(s)eeing the two cats get on each other’s nerves is very entertaining."

The music in this short was praised. Author Mervyn Cooke stated that it was impressive that "[Scott] Bradley's ability to catch the action in sometimes inordinate detail yet still bind his illustrative effects together in music that made autonomous structural sense." Cooke stated that the "musical 'binding' was sometimes achieved by the simple device of tying the music in with rhythmicized actions in the images." Cooke includes the instance with the "two cats bashing themselves into brick walls" as an example.

Author Thad Komorowski stated that "(o)ne of the series' highlights (animated by Ray Patterson) is here, with a whole wall coming down on Butchs' fingers and Jerry playing 'Yankee Doodle' on the other end."

== Availability ==
VHS

- Tom & Jerry Cartoon Festival, Volume Three

Laserdisc

- Tom & Jerry Cartoon Festival, Volume Three
- The Art of Tom & Jerry, Volume 1, Side 3

DVD

- Tom and Jerry: The Classic Collection, Volume One
- Tom and Jerry Spotlight Collection, Volume Two
- Tom & Jerry's Greatest Chases, Volume Four
- Tom and Jerry Golden Collection, Volume One
- Tom and Jerry: Tricks and Treats
- Tom and Jerry: The Golden Era Anthology

Blu-ray

- Tom and Jerry Golden Collection, Volume One
- Tom and Jerry: The Golden Era Anthology
