= Tom and Jerry: The Magic Ring =

2002 direct-to-video Tom and Jerry film

- Promotional poster
- Directed by: James Tim Walker
- Written by: Tim Cahill; Julie McNally
- Based on: Tom and Jerry by: William Hanna; Joseph Barbera
- Produced by: Tom Minton
- Starring: Jeff Glen Bennett; Jim Cummings; Maile Flanagan; Jess Harnell; Maurice LaMarche; Tress MacNeille; Charlie Schlatter; Tara Strong; Frank Welker; Billy West
- Edited by: Bradford H. Keatts
- Music by: J. Eric Schmidt
- Production companies: Turner Entertainment Co. Warner Bros. Animation
- Distributed by: Warner Home Video
- Release date: March 12, 2002
- Running time: 62 minutes
- Country: United States
- Language: English

Tom and Jerry: The Magic Ring is a 2002 American animated fantasy comedy film. Produced by Warner Bros. Animation (making it the first Tom and Jerry production to be made by that company, as parent company Time Warner, had purchased franchise then-owner Turner Broadcasting System in 1996) and Turner Entertainment Co., it was the first direct-to-video attempt to recapture the style of William Hanna and Joseph Barbera's original film shorts from Metro-Goldwyn-Mayer as well as the final animated collaboration of both Hanna and Barbera, as Hanna died on March 22, 2001. It was directed by James Tim Walker, written by Tim Cahill & Julie McNally, produced by Tom Minton, and edited by Bradford H. Keatts.

The film was initially set for a 2001 release, but was instead released on March 12, 2002 on both VHS and DVD. A Game Boy Advance video game based on the film was also made.

== Plot ==
In a haunted and creepy mansion, Tom chases Jerry while breaking things. Meanwhile, in the basement, Tom's owner (a wizard named Chip) attempts to make a potion using his magic ring but uses the wrong kind of milk for the concoction. Tom ends up in the basement and Chip orders him to guard the ring while he travels to Calcutta to get the correct milk. If Tom does a good job, he'll be rewarded with a juicy salmon. But if not, he will be thrown out on the street. Unknown to Tom, Jerry finds the ring while climbing the table and puts it on his head, wearing it like a crown. Jerry runs out of the mansion, and Tom follows, trying to find him to get the ring back.

Jerry tries to get the ring removed by going to a jewelry store. However, the owner has left for lunch, and Tom sneaks in and disguises himself as the owner. He helps Jerry try to get the ring off, but to no avail. Afterward, Jerry goes into a house and runs into Butch and Droopy (who is a psychic). Butch attempts to get the ring off Jerry's head but also fails. Tom comes in, and Jerry runs out, with Butch chasing after him as well. They end up in an alley where an alley cat is napping. He wakes up and tries to eat Jerry, but Tom rescues him using the ring's magic powers. Butch arrives and finally gets the ring off Jerry's head. Tom and the alley cat then chase Butch, and the ring gets stuck back on Jerry again. When Tom is running away from Butch and the alley cat, he slips on a banana peel and ends up unconscious outside a pet store.

A kind old lady takes them inside the store, filled with animals worldwide. She puts them in two cages; however, Tom is paired with Spike and his son Tyke, while Jerry is left with two mice named Freddie and Joey, who bully a young diaper-wearing mouse named Nibbles. Jerry uses the ring to stop the mouse bullies from hurting Nibbles by turning them into chunks of cheese. When the cheese mice escape the cage, Jerry uses the ring to make Nibbles grow into a giant mouse, who breaks free and chases the cheese mice from the store. A boy buys Jerry, but the ring produces magic, melting Tom and allowing him to escape his cage. Tom sneaks outside and snatches Jerry from the boy's hand, whose Mother tells a police officer. The alley cat and Butch, together with Spike and Tyke, also chase Tom, who escapes with Jerry by riding a bus driven by Droopy. Eventually, the duo ends up cornered in a garbage dump, where Jerry uses the magic ring to freeze Butch, Spike, Tyke, the alley cat, and police cars. Now safe, Tom and Jerry head back to the mansion, where Tom once again tries to get the ring off. Jerry hides in a kitchen cupboard and uses the furniture ring remover to get the ring off before throwing it down into the basement. Tom retrieves the ring, but to his horror, it gets stuck on his finger.

Hearing Chip returning home, Tom tries to get the ring off. Thinking that Tom stole his ring, Chip angrily kicks him out of the mansion, causing the ring to fall off Tom's finger. This unfreezes the cat, Butch, Spike, Tyke, and police cars from earlier along with the cheese mice and Nibbles, who all chase Tom into the sunset.

At the conclusion, Chip becomes Jerry's owner. He gives him the salmon, and with the ring's power, Jerry turns it into cheese.

== Cast ==
- Jeff Bennett as Tom Cat, Droopy Dog, and Joey
- Frank Welker as Jerry Mouse, Tyke
- Charlie Schlatter as Chip
- Jim Cummings as Butch
- Maile Flanagan as Boy
- Jess Harnell as Police Officer
- Maurice LaMarche as Spike Bulldog and Butch Cat (credited as "Alleycat")
- Tress MacNeille as Margaret and Mom
- Tara Strong as Nibbles Mouse
- Billy West as Freddie

== Reception ==
Tom and Jerry: The Magic Ring received mixed reviews from critics.

Carrie R. Wheadon of Common Sense Media gave a negative review, saying, "There's very little magic here at all and very little story that makes sense or fits together." She provides a rating of two out of five stars. Christopher Simons of DVD Talk was slightly more positive, stating, "I'd say pick it up, but only for the younger ones."

== Follow-up film ==
Tom and Jerry: Blast Off to Mars was released on January 18, 2005.
