= Muppet Pinball Mayhem =

2002 video game

- Developer: Digital Eclipse
- Publisher: NewKidCo (US) Ubi Soft (EU)
- Platform: Game Boy Advance
- Release: NA: May 2002; EU: 4 July 2002
- Genre: Pinball
- Mode: Single-player

Muppet Pinball Mayhem is a 2002 pinball video game for the Game Boy Advance developed by Digital Eclipse and published by NewKidCo in the United States and Ubi Soft in Europe.

== Gameplay ==
Muppet Pinball Mayhem is a pinball video game. The game features local multiplayer through allowing between two and four players to take turns on the board.

== Reception ==
Reception

Review scores
Publication	Score
IGN	7.9/10
Jeuxvideo.com	14/20
Game Boy Extreme	65%
Nintendo Official Magazine	6/10

Tim Wright of Game Boy Extreme considered the game to "play well enough" and feature "good graphics", highlighting the added "tricks, secrets and minigames" and "oodles of detail" on the game's pinball tables. Describing the game as "good fun", Nintendo Official Magazine praised the "imaginative and colourful" tables, but considered them to lack detail and "any real tension or excitement" to sustain interest.
