= The Midnight Snack =

1941 Tom and Jerry cartoon

- Title card
- Directed by: William Hanna; Joseph Barbera
- Story by: William Hanna; Joseph Barbera
- Produced by: Fred Quimby (uncredited on original issue); William Hanna
- Music by: Scott Bradley (uncredited)
- Color process: Technicolor; Perspecta (re-released in 1958)
- Production company: MGM Cartoons
- Distributed by: Metro-Goldwyn-Mayer
- Release date: July 19, 1941
- Running time: 8 minutes
- Language: English

The Midnight Snack is a Tom and Jerry cartoon released on July 19, 1941. It is the second of the Tom and Jerry films, returning to the basic premise of the previous film, Puss Gets the Boot, following that cartoon's Academy Awards nomination.

This cartoon features the second appearance of Tom and Jerry, and is the first in which the characters are given their familiar names; in the first cartoon, Puss Gets the Boot has the cat named Jasper, and the unnamed mouse.

== Plot ==
Tom watching Jerry standing on a piece of cheese.

The cartoon takes place in a kitchen at midnight. Jerry pokes his head out of the refrigerator door and steals some cheese, unaware that Tom is watching him. Tom weighs the mouse down enough such that he can no longer see in front of him. After Jerry falls off from a rolling pin, Tom emerges from his hiding place with a smug face.

Jerry "salutes" the cat and returns the slice of cheese to the refrigerator. He then proceeds to steal just a tiny bit of cheese, but Tom stomps on his tail with one of his hind paws and replaces the cheese. However, the cat soon realizes that he has the free run of the refrigerator, so he places an iron on top of Jerry's tail and begins eating. Jerry frees himself, but is soon caught by Tom and returns himself to the iron.

Tom then presents Jerry with the wedge of cheese, but the iron attached to Jerry's tail prevents him from reaching the cheese. Tom then proceeds to allow Jerry to lick some cream off a few donuts, and then the mouse gets sprayed with the rest of it, plus a cherry for good measure. Tom then smells the cheese, but soon sees that it is the wedge of cheese, much to his nose's displeasure, and tosses it away. Unfortunately, the cheese smashes some crockery and wakes up Tom's owner, Mammy Two Shoes, who goes downstairs. Tom quickly shoves Jerry into the refrigerator and hides. Mammy rushes in and opens the fridge, screaming in terror when she spots Jerry. Leaping onto a stool and comically hiking up numerous, patterned layers of underclothes, Mammy calls Tom who emerges and pursues Jerry. In the midst of the chase, Mammy leaves the room.

Tom surprises Jerry behind a trash bin, but Jerry tricks Tom into looking over the bin and jumps on the pedal, sending it to crash into Tom's face. Jerry then jumps into the toaster and Tom starts it. Jerry pops up, his tail is on fire, and cools it in a sink full of water, only to be chased again by Tom. Tom ends up losing his grip and gets his tail caught up in an ironing board, with his body facing the refrigerator. Jerry climbs down the blind, picks up a fork with his tail and stabs Tom with the fork, causing Tom to slide down the board and eventually breaking the plates, up a washing board, onto the grater and crashes into the fridge just as Jerry had planned.

Mammy re-enters the room on the belief that Tom has caught Jerry and disposed of Jerry. Then she opens the refrigerator door to get Tom a bowl of cream, only to find Tom in the refrigerator, covered in food. Jerry overhears Mammy shouting at Tom and kicking the screeching cat out of the house while munching on his wedge of cheese and feeling very pleased with himself.

== Voice cast ==
- Harry E. Lang as Tom and Jerry (vocal effects) (uncredited)
- Lillian Randolph as Mammy Two Shoes (1941 original version) (uncredited)
- Thea Vidale as Mammy Two Shoes (1989 dubbed version) (uncredited)

== Reception ==
Motion Picture Exhibitor reviewed the short on August 6, 1941, not yet recognizing the soon-to-be stars as anything special: "The old story of the cat and the mouse, with the latter again victorious over the cat who winds up in the refrigerator. Some byplay is humorous. Fair."

== Home media ==
DVD

- Tom and Jerry Spotlight Collection, Volume Two, disc one (2005)
- Tom and Jerry: The Deluxe Anniversary Collection, disc one (2010)
- Tom and Jerry Golden Collection Volume One, disc one (2011)
- Tom and Jerry: The Golden Era Anthology disc one (2025)

VHS

- Starring Tom & Jerry

LaserDisc

- Tom & Jerry Classics
- The Art of Tom & Jerry
