= Tom and Jerry: Forbidden Compass =

2025 film by Zhang Gang

- Theatrical release poster
- Chinese: 猫和老鼠：星盘奇缘
- Directed by: Zhang Gang
- Written by: Zhang Gang
- Based on: Tom and Jerry by: William Hanna; Joseph Barbera
- Produced by: Zhang Gang; Chen Bofei; Jasmine Gao; Huixia Zhang; Shaojing Yang
- Starring: John Shang; Ruan Yeifei; Kyle McCarley; Brent Mukai
- Edited by: Chen Mengyue
- Music by: Hank Lee
- Production companies: Warner Bros. Pictures Animation; China Film Co., Ltd.; Warner Bros. (F.E.); Origin Animation
- Distributed by: Wuzhou Film Distribution (China); Viva Pictures (United States)
- Release dates: 2 August 2025 (China); 4 September 2026 (United States)
- Running time: 104 minutes
- Countries: China; United States
- Languages: Mandarin; English
- Box office: $5.9 million

Tom and Jerry: Forbidden Compass (Chinese: 猫和老鼠：星盘奇缘; also released in the United States as "Tom and Jerry and the Forbidden Compass") is a 2025 animated adventure comedy film based on the Tom and Jerry franchise created by William Hanna and Joseph Barbera. Written and directed by Zhang Gang, the film was produced by China Film Co., Ltd., Warner Bros. Pictures and Origin Animation It is the first fully computer-animated feature-length film in the Tom and Jerry franchise.

The film premiered at the 27th Shanghai International Film Festival on 21 June 2025 and was released theatrically by Wuzhou Film Distribution in China on 2 August 2025. The film was also released theatrically by Viva Pictures in the United States on 4 September 2026 under its Viva Kids label. It was universally panned by critics, and has grossed over $5 million worldwide.

== Plot ==
During a chase through a museum, Tom and Jerry discover a mysterious compass that transports them to a fantastical world inspired by Chinese mythology. To return home, the pair must work together on a journey involving magical creatures, ancient secrets, and new allies.

== Voice cast ==
- John Shang as Tom Cat, a British cat
- Ruan Yifei as Jerry Mouse, house mouse
- Jiang Wen as Heavenly Master
- Wang Baoshun as Phoenix Master
- Li Boxin as Lil Feeney
- Li Hanlin as Ten Ten and Xander
- Long Lan as Sonny
- Zhang Wenjie as Jade
- Tu Xiongfei as Mega Rat
- Li Zongcheng as Young Mega Rat
- Bai Weichen as Jade's Beijing opera singing voice
- Zhang Gang as Devil Tom

=== English dub ===
- Andrew Kishino as Heavenly Master
- Kyle McCarley as Phoenix Master
- Cory Yee as Lil Feeney
- Andrew Grace as Ten Ten
- Ryan Garcia as Xander
- Christopher W. Jones as Sonny (Note: Although the credits list Todd Haberkorn as Sonny, Jones would confirm to being the actual voice of the character.)
- Miya Kodama as Jade
- Brent Mukai as Mega Rat
- Eduardo De Los Reyes as Gold Tooth
- Grant George as panicked villager
- Marc Haize as Singer #1

== Production ==
Tom & Jerry: Forbidden Compass was written and directed by Zhang Gang and produced by China Film Co., Ltd., Warner Bros. Pictures, Origin Animation, and Turner Entertainment Co. The project was developed as a Chinese co-production and marked the first fully computer-animated feature film in the Tom and Jerry franchise. The filmmakers sought to combine the classic slapstick comedy of Tom and Jerry with elements of Chinese mythology, folklore, and fantasy adventure. The film was produced with the participation of Warner Bros. Pictures, which collaborated with Chinese partners on the project.

ReDefine Animation handled animation services, while Fame's Skopje Studio Orchestra in North Macedonia handled music, alongside composer, Hank Lee.

== Release ==
Tom & Jerry: Forbidden Compass had its world premiere at the 27th Shanghai International Film Festival on 21 June 2025, where it was screened as part of the festival's animation lineup. Warner Bros. Pictures announced the film's Chinese theatrical release in June 2025. Distributed by Wuzhou Film Distribution Co., Ltd., the film was released nationwide in China on 2 August 2025. In April 2026, Viva Pictures acquired North American distribution rights to the film. The company scheduled a theatrical release in the United States for 9 September 2026 under its Viva Kids label. On 5 August 2026, the film was moved up a week to 4 September.

== Reception ==
On the review aggregator website Rotten Tomatoes, 0% of 11 critics' reviews are positive, with an average rating of 3.2/10. Metacritic, which uses a weighted average, assigned the film a score of 24 out of 100, based on 4 critics, indicating "generally unfavorable" reviews.

Leslie Felperin of The Guardian awarded the film two out of five stars, criticizing its excessive visual spectacle and describing the film as "a barrage of bright colours and noise". Tara Brady of The Irish Times also gave the film two out of five stars, writing that Tom and Jerry were overshadowed by newly introduced characters and that the film strayed too far from the franchise's traditional formula. Mark Kermode was similarly critical, comparing the viewing experience to "being shouted at by a hyperactive child".
