= The Adventures of Elmo in Grouchland (video game) =

1999 video game

- Game Boy Color cover Windows cover
- Developers: Bonsai Entertainment Corp. Mattel Media (Windows)
- Publishers: NA: NewKidCo; EU: Ubi Soft; WW: Mattel Media (Windows)
- Platforms: Game Boy Color, Microsoft Windows
- Release: EU: November 2000; NA: October 1999; NA: September 24, 1999 (Windows)
- Genres: Platformer; Edutainment (Windows)
- Mode: Single-player

The Adventures of Elmo in Grouchland was published by NewKidCo for Game Boy Color and Mattel Media for Windows in 1999. This game is a platforming side scroller based on the movie of the same name.

== Gameplay ==
There are eight side-scrolling platform levels in Elmo in Grouchland, and each one is very short. The player generally spends each level hopping over obstacles such as fire hydrants. Along with the eight platforming levels are two alternate style levels, each one different. In one, the player is sitting in a minecart and has to duck the low ceilings as the mine cart moves forward. The other involves Elmo falling into Grouchland, through Oscar the Grouch's trash can. The player moves Elmo left and right, helping him to avoid trash.

== CD-ROM version ==
The Adventures of Elmo in Grouchland was also released as a Sesame Street CD-ROM game for home computers. The game was published by Mattel Media in October 1999, and re-released by Encore Software and Sesame Workshop in 2005. Travel with Elmo to recover his lost blanket in Grouchland. Concepts introduced include sharing and friendship, while skills such as problem solving, observation, prediction, and spatial relations are emphasized.
