= Tom and Jerry & Tex Avery Too! =

Tom and Jerry & Tex Avery Too! Volume 1: The 1950s

Soundtrack album by Scott Bradley
- Released: November 2006
- Recorded: 1950–1958
- Genre: Film score
- Length: 1:59:02
- Label: Film Score Monthly
- Producer: Lukas Kendall; Daniel Goldmark

Tom and Jerry & Tex Avery Too! Volume 1: The 1950s is a 2006 soundtrack album containing Scott Bradley's film scores from Metro-Goldwyn-Mayer's Tom and Jerry, Droopy and Tex Avery theatrical cartoon shorts. These cartoons' soundtracks were selected as the first release because they had the best sound quality. A second volume was digitally released in 2010.

== Track listing ==
All music is composed by Scott Bradley.

Disc one
No.	Title	Length
1.	"Touché, Pussy Cat!"	6:23
2.	"That's My Mommy"	6:04
3.	"Deputy Droopy"	5:33
4.	"Blue Cat Blues"	7:07
5.	"T.V. of Tomorrow"	7:28
6.	"Busy Buddies"	6:00
7.	"Mouse for Sale"	6:46
8.	"Give and Tyke"	6:10
9.	"Dixieland Droopy"	7:29
10.	"Little Johnny Jet"	7:02
11.	"Neapolitan Mouse"	7:09
12.	"Happy Go Ducky"	5:55
Total length:		79:40

Disc two
No.	Title	Length
1.	"Field and Scream"	5:49
2.	"Pecos Pest"	6:03
3.	"Billy Boy"	5:49
4.	"Downbeat Bear"	5:36
5.	"Pet Peeve"	5:42
6.	"Tom and Chérie"	6:19
7.	"Cellbound"	5:16
8.	"Tom's Photo Finish"	6:04
9.	"Tot Watchers"	6:08
10.	"Scat Cats"	6:09
11.	"Homesteader Droopy"	6:56
12.	"Downhearted Duckling"	6:24
13.	"Barbecue Brawl"	6:26
Total length:		79:22
