= Saturday Evening Puss =

1950 animated short film directed by Joseph Barbera

- Title card
- Directed by: William Hanna; Joseph Barbera
- Story by: William Hanna; Joseph Barbera (both uncredited)
- Produced by: Fred Quimby
- Starring: Lillian Randolph; June Foray (1960's reanimated version); William Hanna (all uncredited)
- Music by: Scott Bradley
- Animation by: Ed Barge; Kenneth Muse; Irven Spence; Ray Patterson; MGM Animation/Visual Arts (1960's reanimated version)
- Layouts by: Richard Bickenbach (uncredited)
- Backgrounds by: Robert Gentle (uncredited)
- Color process: Technicolor; Perspecta (reissue)
- Production company: MGM Cartoons
- Distributed by: Metro-Goldwyn-Mayer
- Release date: January 14, 1950
- Running time: 6:30
- Language: English

Saturday Evening Puss is a 1950 one-reel animated cartoon and is the 48th Tom and Jerry short directed by William Hanna and Joseph Barbera. The cartoon was released on January 14, 1950, produced by Fred Quimby, scored by Scott Bradley and animated by Ed Barge, Kenneth Muse, Irven Spence and Ray Patterson. It is the only Tom and Jerry cartoon to feature Mammy Two Shoes' face on-screen, though only briefly. A re-edited version was produced in the 1960s, replacing Mammy with a white teenage girl.

== Plot ==
Mammy leaves for her Saturday night bridge club. Tom then rushes to the window and signals to his three alley cat friends, Butch, Topsy, and Lightning that it is "ok for the party". They arrive for a loud session of jazz music; however, the noise disturbs Jerry, who is trying to sleep. He complains to Tom, who ignores him. Jerry tries to disrupt the party by tearing the tonearm off the phonograph, shutting Topsy in a drawer and slamming the piano lid shut on Butch's hands. The cats chase Jerry back into his mouse hole but, deciding that they will not be able to party as long as Jerry is around, turn their music back on to lure him out again. Jerry takes the bait, and the cats chase him. Tom eventually catches him and ties him up with windowsill string.

Nevertheless, Jerry manages to reach the telephone and calls Mammy, telling her about the party. Mammy races back home and confronts the cats. The three cats try to run but Mammy grabs Tom by the tail and unleashes her fury, throwing all four cats out the front door. At home, Mammy badmouths the cats for ruining her entire evening. She then decides to relax by playing the same jazz recording that the cats were playing, turning Jerry's brief contentment to immediate dismay and leaving him no better off than before.

== Edited version ==
In the re-animated 1966 version, Mammy Two-Shoes was replaced with a white teenage girl, and her night out at the Lucky Seven Bridge Club was redone as a night out dancing with her boyfriend. Her voice was provided by voice actress June Foray, and the animation changes were done by MGM Animation/Visual Arts. In addition, Jerry's voice when he complains to Tom about the noise is muted out. This changed version is found on The Art of Tom & Jerry laserdisc release and The Very Best of Tom & Jerry VHS release both by MGM/UA Home Video in the 1990s.

== Voice cast ==
- Lillian Randolph as Mammy Two Shoes (1950 original version, uncredited)
  - June Foray as Teenage Girl (1966 re-animated version, uncredited)
  - Thea Vidale as Mammy Two Shoes (1991 redubbed version, uncredited)
- William Hanna as the vocal effects for Tom, Jerry, and The Alley Cats (uncredited)

== Reception ==
The Film Daily reviewed the cartoon on February 16, 1950, saying, "When Beulah, the maid, steps out to her Saturday night social, Tom the cat decides to throw a shindig for the rest of the gang. This disturbs Jerry, the mouse, who tells Beulah — who hurriedly stops the party. Marvelous cartoon."

== Availability ==
=== VHS ===
- The Very Best of Tom & Jerry (1991) (1966 re-animated version)

=== LaserDisc ===
- The Art of Tom & Jerry: Volume I, Side 7 (1993) (1966 re-animated version)

=== DVD ===
- Tom and Jerry Spotlight Collection Volume 2, Disc 2 (2005)
- Tom and Jerry: The Deluxe Anniversary Collection, Disc 1 (2010)
- Tom and Jerry's Greatest Chases Volume 4 (2010)
- Tom and Jerry: The Golden Era Anthology, Disc 3 (2025)

=== Blu-ray ===
- Tom and Jerry: The Golden Era Anthology, Disc 3 (2025)
