= Tom Cat =

Fictional cat

- Tom and Jerry character
- Tom's design in the Hanna-Barbera shorts.
- First appearance: Jasper: Puss Gets the Boot (1940); Tom or Thomas: The Midnight Snack (1941)
- Created by: William Hanna; Joseph Barbera
- Designed by: Harvey Eisenberg (1940–1953, 1980, 2002-present); Richard Bickenbach (1953–1958, 2001)
- Voiced by: Harry E. Lang (1940–1953); William Hanna (archival recordings; 1942–1958, 1965-1967, 2006-present); Mel Blanc (1946, 1964-1967); Daws Butler (1957); Allen Swift (1961–1962); Terence Monk (1964, 1967); June Foray (1966); John Stephenson (1975); Lou Scheimer (1980); Frank Welker (1990–1993); Richard Kind (speaking; 1992); Alan Marriott (2000); Jeff Bennett (2002); Marc Silk (2002); Bill Kopp (2005); Spike Brandt (2005–2017); Don Brown (2006–2008); Rich Danhakl (2014–2021); Andrew Dickman (2021); Kaiji Tang (2021); Eric Bauza (2022); Megumi Aratake (2022); Rick Zieff (2025); John Shang (2026)
- Developed by: William Hanna & Joseph Barbera

In-universe information
- Full name: Thomas Jasper Cat Sr.
- Species: Cat
- Gender: Male
- Family: Unnamed father Unnamed mother Tim (twin brother)
- Relatives: George (cousin); Catsby (cousin); Unnamed grandfather
- Nationality: American
- Breed: Bicolor British cat

Thomas "Tom" Jasper Cat Sr. is an American cartoon character and one of the two titular main protagonists (the other being Jerry Mouse) in Metro-Goldwyn-Mayer's series of Tom and Jerry theatrical animated short films. Created by William Hanna and Joseph Barbera, he is a grey-blue and white anthropomorphic (but usually silent) domestic short haired tuxedo British cat who first appeared in the 1940 MGM animated short Puss Gets the Boot. The cat was initially known as "Jasper" during his debut in the short, but beginning with The Midnight Snack he was known as "Tom" or "Thomas".

== History ==
=== Tom and Jerry cartoons ===
Tom's full name, "Tom Cat", is based on "tomcat", a word which refers to male cats. He is usually mute and speaks only rarely, though he frequently screams in pain when his plans to catch Jerry Mouse backfire. His trademark scream was provided by creator William Hanna. Hanna's recordings of Tom screaming were later used as a stock sound effect for other MGM cartoon characters such as Tex Avery's Butch Bulldog and multiple one shot characters.

Tom has changed over the years, especially after the first cartoons. He first walked on four legs, but after the cartoon Dog Trouble, he started walking on two. In 1945 shorts, he had twisted whiskers and his appearance kept changing. In the 1940s and early 1950s, he had white fur between his eyes. In newer cartoons, the white fur is gone. As a slapstick cartoon character, Tom has a superhuman level of elasticity.

Tom is usually defeated in the end (or very rarely, killed, like in Mouse Trouble, where he explodes), although there are some stories where he outwits and defeats Jerry. Besides Jerry, he also has trouble with other mouse or cat characters. One of them that appears frequently is Spike Bulldog. Spike regularly appears and usually assists Jerry and beats up Tom (though on some occasions, Tom beats Spike or Spike turns on Jerry, like his debut appearance in Dog Trouble).

He is almost always called by his full name "Thomas" by Mammy Two-Shoes.

=== Anchors Aweigh and Dangerous When Wet ===
Tom and Jerry showed up together in the 1945 Technicolor Metro-Goldwyn-Mayer musical Anchors Aweigh where Tom briefly appears as a butler for King Jerry, the latter who has a dance sequence with Gene Kelly, and also in another musical with the same studio Dangerous When Wet (1953), where, in a dream sequence, main character Katie Higgins (Esther Williams) does an underwater ballet with Tom and Jerry, as well as animated depictions of the different people in her life.

=== Tom & Jerry (2021) ===
The 2021 movie was the first time when live-action human actors interact with Tom and Jerry who, along with various other iconic characters of the show and all other animals, are 2D animated cartoons. Both characters are called by their actual first names by the end of the film and their full names are given during the end credits, "Tom" being Thomas D. Cat.

== Voice actors ==
Here are several of his voiceover actors:

- Harry E. Lang (1940–1953): vocal effects in the Hanna-Barbera era (1940–1953) shorts, and speaking in the shorts: The Lonesome Mouse, The Million Dollar Cat, The Mouse Comes to Dinner, Quiet Please!, Solid Serenade, Trap Happy (1943–1946), laughing in The Tom and Jerry Show (archival recording from Mouse Trouble)
- William Hanna (1942–present): Vocal effects in the Hanna-Barbera era (1940–1958) shorts (Note: Archival recordings of Hanna have been used in later productions, namely the Chuck Jones era shorts (1963-1967), Tom and Jerry: Shiver Me Whiskers, Tom and Jerry Tales, The Tom and Jerry Show, Tom & Jerry, Tom and Jerry Special Shorts, Tom and Jerry in New York, MultiVersus, and the Singapore Tom and Jerry shorts)
- Kent Rogers (1942–1943): Vocal effects in the 1942 shorts: Fraidy Cat and Puss n' Toots
- Jerry Mann (1944, 1946, 1950): Vocal effects and speaking in the 1944 shorts: The Zoot Cat and The Million Dollar Cat, speaking in the 1946 short: Solid Serenade (archival recordings from The Zoot Cat), speaking in the 1950 short: The Framed Cat
- Billy Bletcher (1944, 1946): speaking in the 1944 short: The Bodyguard, laughing in the 1946 short: Solid Serenade)
- Mel Blanc (1946, 1953–1954, 1963–1967): Screaming in the 1946 short, The Milky Waif (reused from the 1942 MGM cartoon, The Hungry Wolf), sneezing in the shorts: Just Ducky and Puppy Tale (reused from The Hungry Wolf), vocal effects in the Chuck Jones era (1963–1967), and The Tom and Jerry Show (archival recording from The Hungry Wolf)
- Cal Howard (1946): speaking in the 1946 short: Trap Happy
- Ira "Buck" Woods (1946): singing in the 1946 short: Solid Serenade
- Red Coffey (1950, 1952–1953, 1955): quacking in the shorts: Little Quacker, The Duck Doctor and That's My Mommy, drowning vocal effects in the 1953 short: Just Ducky
- Ken Darby (1950): "singing" in the 1950 short: Texas Tom
- Paul Frees (1951): snoring in Sleepy-Time Tom
- Pinto Colvig (1952): seal vocal effects in the 1952 short: Little Runaway
- Fred Karbo (1953): laughing in the 1953 short: Life with Tom
- Daws Butler (1957): speaking in the 1957 short: Mucho Mouse
- Allen Swift (1961–1962): vocal effects in the Gene Deitch era (1961–1962) shorts
- Gene Deitch (1961–1962): vocal effects in the Gene Deitch era (1961–1962) shorts
- Terence Monk (1964, 1967): singing in The Cat Above and the Mouse Below, singing in Cat and Dupli-cat
- Arte Johnson: Mattel Tom and Jerry Talking Hand Puppet
- June Foray (1966): vocal effects in the 1966 short: Duel Personality
- John Stephenson: The Tom and Jerry Show
- Don Messick: imitating the ghost's laugh in The Tom and Jerry Show (1975 TV series) episode "Castle Wiz"
- Lou Scheimer: The Tom and Jerry Comedy Show
- Frank Welker: Tom & Jerry Kids and The Tom and Jerry Show (2014 TV series) episode "Just Plane Nuts"
- Richard Kind (1992): speaking, non-speaking and singing in Tom and Jerry: The Movie
- Jeff Bergman: Cartoon Network
- Alan Marriott: Tom and Jerry in Fists of Furry
- Jeff Bennett: Tom and Jerry: The Magic Ring
- Marc Silk: Tom and Jerry in War of the Whiskers
- Bill Kopp: Tom and Jerry: Blast Off to Mars and Tom and Jerry: The Fast and the Furry
- Spike Brandt: The Karate Guard, Tom and Jerry: A Nutcracker Tale, Tom and Jerry Meet Sherlock Holmes, Tom and Jerry and the Wizard of Oz, Tom and Jerry: Robin Hood and His Merry Mouse, Tom and Jerry's Giant Adventure, Tom and Jerry: The Lost Dragon, Tom and Jerry: Spy Quest, Tom and Jerry: Back to Oz, and Tom and Jerry: Willy Wonka and the Chocolate Factory
- Don Brown: Tom and Jerry Tales
- Rich Danhakl: The Tom and Jerry Show (2014 TV series)
- Tom Kenny: Four of his 9 lives in The Tom and Jerry Show (2014 TV series)
- Dave B. Mitchell: Three of his 9 lives in The Tom and Jerry Show (2014 TV series)
- Rene Mujica: One of his 9 lives in The Tom and Jerry Show (2014 TV series)
- Erick Bolivar: singing in The Tom and Jerry Show (2014 TV series) episode "Tom Quixote"
- Kaiji Tang: Tom & Jerry
- T-Pain: singing in Tom & Jerry
- Andrew Dickman: Tom and Jerry Special Shorts
- Eric Bauza: whistling in MultiVersus
- Megumi Aratake: Tom and Jerry Japanese shorts
- Rick Zieff: Tom and Jerry Time
- John Shang: Tom and Jerry: Forbidden Compass

Voiced by in unofficial material:

- Stephen Stanton (2012): Mad
- Seth MacFarlane (2013): Family Guy

Tom has had a number of different voice actors over the years. When the character debuted in Puss Gets the Boot, voice actor Harry E. Lang provided the screeches and meows for Tom. He would continue to do so until Sufferin Cats (1943). Beginning with the short The Night Before Christmas (1941), co-creator William Hanna provided the vocal effects and famous screams for the character until the last Hanna-Barbera short Tot Watchers (1958). This was accomplished by someone recording him screaming, chopping the top and bottom of it, leaving the strongest part of the recording in. During this time period, Lang continued doing vocal effects for Tom and occasionally did his speaking voice between 1943 and 1946. Billy Bletcher also voiced him in a few shorts between 1944 and 1950. In 1961–1962, when Gene Deitch took over as director after the MGM cartoon studio shut down in 1957, he and Allen Swift did vocal effects for Tom throughout that time period. When Chuck Jones took over during 1963–1967, Mel Blanc (best known for voicing Bugs Bunny and other characters) and June Foray voiced Tom. Terence Monk did his singing voice in The Cat Above and the Mouse Below (1964) and Cat and Dupli-cat (1967).

In The Tom and Jerry Show (1975), Tom was voiced by John Stephenson. Lou Scheimer voiced him in The Tom and Jerry Comedy Show in 1980–1982. Frank Welker voiced him in Tom and Jerry Kids in 1990–1993. Other voice actors include Richard Kind (in Tom and Jerry: The Movie), Jeff Bergman (in a Cartoon Network Latin America bumper and a Boomerang UK bumper), Alan Marriott (in Tom and Jerry in Fists of Furry), Jeff Bennett (in Tom and Jerry: The Magic Ring), Marc Silk (in Tom and Jerry in War of the Whiskers), Bill Kopp (in Tom and Jerry: Blast Off to Mars and Tom and Jerry: The Fast and the Furry), Spike Brandt (in The Karate Guard, Tom and Jerry: A Nutcracker Tale, Tom and Jerry Meet Sherlock Holmes, Tom and Jerry and the Wizard of Oz, Tom and Jerry: Robin Hood and His Merry Mouse, Tom and Jerry's Giant Adventure, Tom and Jerry: The Lost Dragon, Tom and Jerry: Spy Quest, Tom and Jerry: Back to Oz, and Tom and Jerry: Willy Wonka and the Chocolate Factory), and Don Brown (in Tom and Jerry Tales). In The Tom and Jerry Show (2014 TV series), his vocal effects are provided by the show's sound designer Rich Danhakl and archival recordings of William Hanna from the original theatrical shorts. In the 2021 live-action animated film Tom & Jerry, his voice was provided by Kaiji Tang and archived recordings of William Hanna.

On November 18, 2021, it was confirmed that Eric Bauza would be voicing the character in the 2022 fighting game, MultiVersus, which establishes Tom's original given name "Jasper" to be his middle name. Additionally, William Hanna's archival audio recordings (usually Tom's iconic screams as a death scream sound) are also used in the game. In Cartoon Network Japan's Tom and Jerry shorts, Tom was voiced by Megumi Aratake.

== In popular culture ==
Tom's screams have been used as stock sound effects in various media, such as the 1981 James Bond film For Your Eyes Only, Critters 2 and Critters 3 (used for the Critters when they scream and shriek) and the Hi Hi Puffy AmiYumi episode, "Small Stuff" (used for Jang Keng, a black cat). It was also used for the caveman in the 1995 game Prehistorik Man.

Tom and Jerry were planned to make cameo appearances in the deleted scene "Acme's Funeral" from the 1988 film Who Framed Roger Rabbit. In that deleted scene, they appear with other animated characters scared when Casper appears at the funeral.

The Itchy & Scratchy Show from The Simpsons parodies Tom and Jerry, with its cat character Scratchy, unlike Tom, usually being portrayed as a harmless character who is subject to wanton unprovoked graphic violence by the psychopathic Itchy.

Xilam's Oggy and the Cockroaches is inspired by Tom and Jerry, with its cat character Oggy being portrayed as the hapless victim of three sadistic cockroaches.

Tom and Jerry made a cameo appearance in the 1992 animated TV special The Rosey and Buddy Show.

The supreme leader of Iran, Ali Khamenei likened the rivalry between the United States and the Islamic Republic of Iran to Tom and Jerry, with the United States in the role of Tom.

Time Magazine noted that late Palestinian leader Yasser Arafat admired Tom and Jerry because, in his view, the mouse always outwits the cat—mirroring how Palestinians, seen as the underdog, persist despite adversity.

In 2025, Tom, alongside Jerry, was featured as a playable pilot in Bullet Hell game ACECRAFT.

== See also ==
- List of Hanna-Barbera characters
- Metro-Goldwyn-Mayer cartoon studio
