= Jerry Mouse =

Fictional mouse

- Tom and Jerry character
- Jerry's design in the Hanna-Barbera shorts
- First appearance: Jinx: Puss Gets the Boot (1940); Jerry or Gerald: The Midnight Snack (1941)
- Created by: William Hanna; Joseph Barbera
- Designed by: Harvey Eisenberg (1940–1953, 1980, 2002-present); Richard Bickenbach (1953–1958, 2001)
- Voiced by: William Hanna (1940–1958, 2006, 2014–present); Harry E. Lang (1943–1945); Sara Berner (1944–1945); Paul Frees (1951, 1956); Manuel Paris (1957); Allen Swift (1961–1962); Mel Blanc (1963–1967); Terence Monk (1964); June Foray (1965–1967); Dale McKennon (1967); John Stephenson (1975); Lou Scheimer (1980); Frank Welker (1990–2002); Dana Hill (also speaking; 1992); Alan Marriott (2000–2002); Marc Silk (2002); Bill Kopp (2005); Spike Brandt (2005–2017); Sam Vincent (2006–2008); Rich Danhakl (2014–2021); André Sogliuzzo (2021); Andrew Dickman (2021); Eric Bauza (2022); Aya Yonekura (2022); Sara Kapner (2025); Ruan Yifei (2026)

In-universe information
- Full name: Gerald/Jerome Jinx Mouse
- Species: House mouse (Mus musculus)
- Gender: Male
- Family: Nibbles (nephew)
- Relatives: Pecos and Harry (uncles); Muscles and Merlin (cousins); Dinky and Sniffles (nephews); Unnamed mother; Geraldine Mouse (sister)
- Nationality: American

Gerald Jerome "Jerry" Jinx Mouse, is an American character and one of the two titular characters in Metro-Goldwyn-Mayer's series of Tom and Jerry theatrical animated short films and other animated media, usually acting as the protagonist opposite his rival Tom Cat. Created by William Hanna and Joseph Barbera, Jerry is an anthropomorphic (but usually silent) brown house mouse, who first appeared in the 1940 MGM animated short Puss Gets the Boot.

The character was not referred to by name in his debut cartoon; Hanna said that the mouse's original name as "Jinx", while Barbera claimed the mouse went unnamed in his first appearance. A 1940 article from MGM's Short Story magazine, however, would refer to the character as "Pee-Wee".

== History ==
=== Tom and Jerry cartoons ===
The name "Jerry" was chosen by Geraint Rowlands, who submitted "Tom and Jerry" as potential names for the duo after an important Loews Inc. distributor in Texas asked for follow-ups to Puss Gets the Boot. While the idea of a cat-and-mouse duo was considered shopworn by the 1940s, Hanna and Barbera decided to expand upon the standard expected cat and mouse relationship. Instead of being a "cowering victim" of Tom, he took delight in besting, and even torturing, his feline frenemy (even if Tom is just following orders or is even just minding his own business and is antagonized by Jerry). Hanna and Barbera considered Tom and Jerry "the best of enemies", whose rivalry hid an unspoken amount of mutual caring and respect for one another. Indeed, Tom and Jerry are not always enemies; they have been known to stop fighting with each other long enough to team up on occasion and get rid of a common foe if the situation calls for it.

In later Tom and Jerry cartoons, Jerry acquired a young ward: a small grey mouse called "Tuffy" or "Nibbles" depending upon the cartoon, who was left on Jerry's doorstep as a foundling baby in the 1946 short The Milky Waif. Jerry and Tuffy were also featured together in a sub-series of Tom and Jerry cartoons set in 17th century France which featured the characters as musketeers. The first of these shorts, The Two Mouseketeers, won the 1951 Academy Award for Best Short Subject: Cartoons.

Hanna and Barbera served as writer/directors of the Tom and Jerry cartoons until 1956, when they also became the producers. Fourteen Tom and Jerry cartoons between 1940 and 1954 were nominated for the Academy Award for Best Short Subject: Cartoons, with seven of the shorts winning that award. MGM shut down its animation department in 1957, but new Tom and Jerry cartoons were produced by Gene Deitch and later Chuck Jones during the 1960s. Jerry would also appear in later Tom and Jerry productions made for television, a series of direct-to-video features, and Tom and Jerry: The Movie, a 1992 theatrical film. Later productions eschewed much of the violence the 1940s and 1950s shorts were known for, and in several of the television shows Jerry was given a red bowtie and a kinder disposition in Tom & Jerry Kids.

=== Anchors Aweigh ===
On his own, Jerry Mouse appears in a fantasy sequence in the 1945 Gene Kelly MGM musical film Anchors Aweigh. Jerry appears as the young ruler of a kingdom where music is banned because he feels he lacks talent, and Kelly persuades the mouse into performing a song-and-dance number with him. Kelly and MGM had originally wanted Walt Disney's Mickey Mouse as Kelly's dance partner for the sequence, but Disney was unwilling to license the character.

Hanna and Barbera achieved the effect of Kelly dancing with Jerry by rotoscoping: live-action plates of Kelly dancing alone were shot first, and the action traced frame by frame so that Jerry's movements would match. The success of the animated segment of Anchors Aweigh, which was mentioned as "stealing the show" in contemporary trade reviews, led to two more live-action/animated projects for Hanna and Barbera and MGM: an underwater ballet sequence featuring both Tom and Jerry in the 1953 film Dangerous When Wet, with Esther Williams, and the "Sinbad the Sailor" sequence of Kelly's 1956 film Invitation to the Dance.

=== Tom & Jerry Kids ===
In 1990, this version of Jerry wears a red bowtie (just like what he used to have in the 1975 Tom and Jerry Show) and has a tuft of hair on his head. He often taunts Tom (as a kitten) any chance he gets. Sometimes, in a few episodes, he is friends with/allies of Tom.

=== Tom & Jerry (2021) ===
The 2021 movie marks the first time when live-action human actors interact with Tom and Jerry who, along with various other iconic characters of the show and all other animals, are 2D animated cartoons. Both characters are called by their actual first names by the end of the film and their full names are given during the end credits, "Jerry" being Jerome A. Mouse.

== Voice actors ==
Like Tom, Jerry is usually a silent character, but this is not a strict rule, and several people have voiced him in various capacities over the years:

- William Hanna: Vocal effects in the Hanna-Barbera era (1940–1958) shorts and speaking in Part-Time Pal, Tom and Jerry: Shiver Me Whiskers (archival recordings from classic shorts), The Tom and Jerry Show (2014, archival recordings from the pre-1958 shorts), Tom & Jerry (2021, archival recordings as before) and Tom and Jerry Special Shorts (2021 series) (archival recordings as before)
- Harry Lang: vocal effects and speaking in The Lonesome Mouse, whistling in The Bodyguard, whistling and sneezing in Mouse in Manhattan
- Kent Rogers: Fraidy Cat and Puss n' Toots vocal effects
- Sara Berner: speaking in The Zoot Cat, speaking and singing voice for Jerry in Anchors Aweigh
- Jerry Mann: The Million Dollar Cat vocal effects
- Lillian Randolph (voice of Mammy Two Shoes): when Jerry and Tuffy disguise to fool Tom in the 1946 short: The Milky Waif
- Frank Graham: speaking in Kitty Foiled
- Georgia Stark: whistling in Kitty Foiled
- Paul Frees: speaking in His Mouse Friday and Blue Cat Blues
- Manuel Paris: speaking in Mucho Mouse
- Allen Swift: vocal effects in the Gene Deitch era (1961–1962) shorts
- Gene Deitch: vocal effects in the Gene Deitch era (1961–1962) shorts
- Mel Blanc: vocal effects in the Chuck Jones era (1963–1967) shorts
- Terence Monk: singing in The Cat Above and the Mouse Below
- June Foray: vocal effects in the Chuck Jones era (1963–1967) shorts, Boomerang UK and Ireland bumper (archival recording from I'm Just Wild About Jerry)
- Walker Edmiston: Mattel Tom and Jerry Talking Hand Puppet
- Dale McKennon: singing in Cat and Dupli-cat
- John Stephenson: The Tom and Jerry Show (1975)
- Lou Scheimer: The Tom and Jerry Comedy Show
- Frank W. Welker: Tom & Jerry Kids & Tom and Jerry: The Magic Ring
- Dana Hill: speaking, non-speaking and singing in Tom and Jerry: The Movie
- Jeff Bergman: Cartoon Network Latin America bumper
- Alan Marriott: Tom and Jerry in Fists of Furry and Tom and Jerry in War of the Whiskers
- Marc Silk: Tom and Jerry in War of the Whiskers (as Monster Jerry)
- Bill Kopp: Tom and Jerry: Blast Off to Mars and Tom and Jerry: The Fast and the Furry
- Spike Brandt: The Karate Guard, Tom and Jerry: A Nutcracker Tale, Tom and Jerry Meet Sherlock Holmes, Tom and Jerry and the Wizard of Oz, Tom and Jerry: Robin Hood and His Merry Mouse, Tom and Jerry's Giant Adventure, Tom and Jerry: The Lost Dragon, Tom and Jerry: Spy Quest, Tom and Jerry: Back to Oz, and Tom and Jerry: Willy Wonka and the Chocolate Factory
- Samuel Vincent: Tom and Jerry Tales
- Rich Danhakl: The Tom and Jerry Show (2014 TV series)
- Rick Zieff: speaking in Spike's voice in The Tom and Jerry Show (2014 TV series) episode "Cat-astrophic Failure"
- André Sogliuzzo: Tom & Jerry (2021 film)
- Andrew Dickman: Tom and Jerry Special Shorts (2021 series)
- Eric Bauza: whistling in MultiVersus
- Aya Yonekura: Tom and Jerry Japanese shorts
- Sara Kapner: Tom and Jerry Time
- Ruan Yifei: Tom and Jerry: Forbidden Compass

Jerry has had a number of voice actors over the years. Ever since his debut in Puss Gets the Boot his vocal effects were provided by co-creator William Hanna during the Hanna-Barbera era. Harry E. Lang did Jerry's vocal effects and speaking voice in the shorts The Lonesome Mouse (1943) and Mouse in Manhattan (1945). Sara Berner voiced Jerry in the short The Zoot Cat (1944), as well as Anchors Aweigh (1945) in a dance sequence with him and Gene Kelly. A sequence in the short The Milky Waif (1946) features Jerry and Nibbles disguising themselves as a pair of black people, in which the former is voiced by Lillian Randolph (same voice as Mammy Two Shoes). Paul Frees did Jerry's speaking voice in the shorts His Mouse Friday (1951) and Blue Cat Blues (1956). Manuel Paris did Jerry's voice in the short Mucho Mouse (1957). When the MGM cartoon studio shut down in 1957 and Gene Deitch and European animation studio Rembrandt Studio took over, he and Allen Swift did Jerry's voice during the 1961–1962 era. During the Chuck Jones era in 1963–1967, his voice was provided by Mel Blanc, June Foray, Chuck Jones, and Abe Levitow. Terence Monk did his voice in the short The Cat Above and the Mouse Below (1964) and Dale McKennon did Jerry's singing voice in Cat and Dupli-cat (1967). In The Tom and Jerry Show (1975), Jerry was voiced by John Stephenson. Lou Scheimer voiced him in The Tom and Jerry Comedy Show (1980–1982). Frank Welker voiced him in Tom and Jerry Kids (1990–1993), and Tom and Jerry: The Magic Ring (2002). Dana Hill voiced Jerry's voice in Tom and Jerry: The Movie (1992).

Other voice actors include Jeff Bergman in a Cartoon Network Latin America bumper, Alan Marriott in Tom and Jerry in Fists of Furry (2000) and Tom and Jerry in War of the Whiskers (2002), Marc Silk in Tom and Jerry in War of the Whiskers (2002; as Monster Jerry), Spike Brandt in The Karate Guard (2005), Tom and Jerry: A Nutcracker Tale (2007), Tom and Jerry Meet Sherlock Holmes (2010), Tom and Jerry and the Wizard of Oz (2011), Tom and Jerry: Robin Hood and His Merry Mouse (2012), Tom and Jerry's Giant Adventure (2013), Tom and Jerry: The Lost Dragon (2014), Tom and Jerry: Spy Quest (2015), Tom and Jerry Back to Oz (2016), and Tom and Jerry: Willy Wonka and the Chocolate Factory (2017), Sam Vincent in Tom and Jerry Tales (2006-2008). In The Tom and Jerry Show (2014 TV series), Jerry's vocal effects are provided by the show's sound designer Rich Danhakl and archival recordings of William Hanna from the original theatrical shorts. In the 2021 live-action animated film Tom & Jerry, his voice was provided by André Sogliuzzo and archived recordings of William Hanna.

On November 18, 2021, it was confirmed that Eric Bauza would be voicing the character on the 2022 fighting game, MultiVersus, which establishes Jerry's original given name "Jinx" to be his middle name. In Cartoon Network Japan's Tom and Jerry shorts, Jerry was voiced by Aya Yonekura.

== In popular culture ==
Tom and Jerry were planned to appear in a cameo in the deleted scene "Acme's Funeral" from the 1988 film Who Framed Roger Rabbit. In that deleted scene, they appear with other animated characters scared when Casper appears at the funeral.

Xilam's Oggy and the Cockroaches is inspired by Tom and Jerry, with the three cockroaches like Dee Dee, Joey, and Marky and being inspired by Jerry.

Tom and Jerry made a cameo appearance in the 1992 animated TV special The Rosey and Buddy Show.

Jerry has been variously credited as Gerald "Jerry" Mouse in the video game Multiversus, and Jerome A. Mouse in the credits to their 2020 feature film. Neither of these conflicting names is considered canon, according to leading animation historian Jerry Beck.

The stage name of Ukrainian singer Jerry Heil was derived from her use of the name "Jerry Mouse" on Russian social media service VK.

The supreme leader of Iran, Ali Khamenei likened the rivalry between the United States and the Islamic Republic of Iran to Tom and Jerry, with Iran in the role of Jerry.

Time Magazine noted that late Palestinian leader Yasser Arafat admired Tom and Jerry because, in his view, the mouse always outwits the cat—mirroring how Palestinians, seen as the underdog, persist despite adversity.

In 2025, Jerry, alongside Tom, was featured as a playable pilot in Bullet Hell game ACECRAFT.

== See also ==
- List of Hanna-Barbera characters
