= Tot Watchers =

1958 animated short film by William Hanna, Joseph Barbera

- Title card
- Directed by: William Hanna; Joseph Barbera
- Story by: Homer Brightman
- Produced by: William Hanna; Joseph Barbera
- Starring: Julie Bennett; Bill Thompson; William Hanna
- Music by: Scott Bradley
- Animation by: Lewis Marshall; James Escalante; Kenneth Muse
- Layouts by: Richard Bickenbach
- Backgrounds by: Robert Gentle
- Color process: Technicolor; CinemaScope; Perspecta
- Production company: MGM Cartoons
- Distributed by: Metro-Goldwyn-Mayer
- Release date: June 25, 1958; (earliest known date)
- Running time: 6:39
- Country: United States
- Language: English

Tot Watchers is a 1958 American one-reel animated Tom and Jerry action comedy short. It was produced and directed by William Hanna and Joseph Barbera with music by Scott Bradley. The short was released by Metro-Goldwyn-Mayer as early as June 25, 1958. It is the 114th and last Tom and Jerry theatrical cartoon produced or directed by both Hanna and Barbera, and the last cartoon short of the series until Gene Deitch's Switchin' Kitten in 1961. Barbera would return to direct one final Tom and Jerry theatrical short, The Karate Guard, in 2005.

In the film, Tom Cat and Jerry Mouse initially attempt to return a wandering infant to its caretaker. When the baby resumes its wanderings and enters a construction site, they go out of their way to protect it. Afterwards, the duo are mistaken for babynappers and arrested by the police for kidnapping the baby.

== Plot ==
Tom and Jerry, engaged in their typical conflict, notice the baby crawling out of its pram. Their attempts to return the infant are unsuccessful, as it repeatedly escapes. During one such incident, the baby enters Spike's doghouse. Tom mistakenly grabs Spike instead of the baby, resulting in a violent confrontation.

Frustrated, Tom brings the baby back to Jeannie, who misinterprets the situation and hits Tom with a broom. Subsequently, Tom disregards the baby's wanderings. However, when the infant crawls into a 100-story construction site, Tom and Jerry are compelled to intervene.

The baby navigates precariously across steel beams while Tom and Jerry pursue. On the 50th floor, Jerry attempts to save the baby by grasping its diaper, but the garment detaches. Tom manages to catch the falling infant. In the ensuing confusion, Tom inadvertently dons the diaper himself while the baby crawls away.

Believing the baby has entered a cement mixer on the 30th floor, Tom and Jerry dive in, only to discover the infant playing with a hammer nearby. Later, a panicked Jeannie informs a police officer about the missing baby. Tom and Jerry return with the infant, exhausted.

As Jeannie retrieves the baby, the police officer (voiced by Bill Thompson) arrests Tom and Jerry under the presumption of kidnapping. In the police car, their explanations are initially dismissed until the baby is seen crawling past, having apparently been neglected by Jeannie once again. This revelation causes the officer to realize Tom and Jerry's innocence.

== Voice cast ==
- Julie Bennett as The Mother / Jeannie the Babysitter (uncredited)
- Bill Thompson as The Police Officer (uncredited)
- William Hanna as the vocal sounds of Tom and Jerry (uncredited)

== Production ==
Tot Watchers was produced by MGM Cartoons. After the departure of producer Fred Quimby from the Tom and Jerry series in 1955, directors William Hanna and Joseph Barbera took the added responsibility of producing the series themselves. According to animation historian Michael Barrier, it was during the post-Quimby period that the effects of the series' lower budget on its animation quality became more obvious, stating that "there was no hiding corner cutting behind a curtain of stylization". Scott Bradley's score for Tot Watchers was recorded on June 6, 1957 - almost 20 years - to the date - after the MGM cartoon department opened.

== Reception ==
Writer and historian Michael Samerdyke stated that Tot Watchers, though it will "never be considered one of the best of the series, ... is an entertaining cartoon and points the way to how the series would develop in the Sixties."

== Home media ==
- Tom and Jerry Spotlight Collection, Vol. 2 (2005)
- Tom and Jerry's Greatest Chases, Vol. 5 (2010)
- Tom and Jerry: The Golden Era Anthology (2025)
