= Tom and Jerry in War of the Whiskers =

2002 video game

- North American PS2 box art
- Developer: VIS Entertainment
- Publishers: NA: NewKidCo; EU: Ubi Soft
- Director: Robbie Graham
- Producer: Robbie Graham
- Programmer: Frank Arnot
- Artist: Jeff Cairns
- Composer: Richard Michael
- Platforms: PlayStation 2, GameCube, Xbox
- Release: PlayStation 2: NA: October 22, 2002; EU: March 14, 2003; JP: January 29, 2004; GameCube: NA: January 4, 2003; Xbox: NA: November 25, 2003
- Genre: Fighting
- Modes: Single-player, multiplayer

Tom and Jerry in War of the Whiskers is a 3D fighting game developed by VIS Entertainment and published by NewKidCo for the PlayStation 2, GameCube, and Xbox. It is the sequel to the 3D cartoon fighting game Tom and Jerry in Fists of Furry. The game features characters from the Tom and Jerry franchise who battle each other in destructible arena environments. It supports up to two players on the PlayStation 2 version and up to four players on the GameCube and Xbox versions.

It is the only NewKidCo title and the only Tom and Jerry game to receive a ESRB T rating. The PlayStation 2 version was released between 2002 and 2004 in all major regions, while the Xbox and GameCube versions were released in 2003 exclusively in North America. The game received mixed reviews from critics.

== Gameplay ==
Gameplay in the Xbox version.

War of the Whiskers is a 3D fighting game, supporting up to four players in arena (show). The objective is to defeat an opponent in a set amount of time and rounds. There are three types of gameplay. First is Challenge mode, where the opponents are the enemies of the character chosen from classic Tom and Jerry cartoons. The final boss is either Monster Jerry, a bigger and scary mutated Jerry, or Robot Cat, one of Tom's creations. Another mode is Versus, a standard-fare one-on-one fight. The last is Tag Battle, where player can play against each other in a two-on-two fight, or play as one team against two opponents.

Players can choose from a wide range of 11 playable characters, some of whom also have unlockable costumes, and 13 arenas with destructible environment, each with a unique set of weapons amounting to more than 75 in total. At the beginning of the game, only two characters (Tom and Jerry) and two arenas (PAWS and A Fridge Too Far) are available; the rest of the characters and arenas have to be unlocked by playing Challenge. Some of the unlockable characters and arenas can only be played in multi-player modes.

== Development and release ==
Tom and Jerry in War of the Whiskers was developed by VIS Entertainment. It was published by NewKidCo in North America and Ubisoft Entertainment in Europe. It is a sequel to Tom and Jerry in Fists of Furry. The game was originally slated to the first quarter of 2002, but was delayed until the third quarter. It was first released for PlayStation 2 on October 22, 2002 in North America, with later PlayStation 2 releases in other regions. It was also released on GameCube and Xbox only in North America in 2003. In Japan, where the PlayStation 2 version was ported and published by Success on January 29, 2004. All voices in the game were provided by Alan Marriott and Marc Silk.

== Reception ==
Reception

Aggregate score
Aggregator	Score
Metacritic	(NGC): 64/100 (PS2): 63/100 (Xbox): 50/100

Review scores
Publication	Score
Famitsu	(PS2): 21/40
GamesMaster	(PS2): 23%
GameSpot	(PS2): 6.4/10
GameZone	(PS2): 7.1/10
IGN	(PS2): 6.3/10
Nintendo Power	(NGC): 3.2/5
TeamXbox	(Xbox): 7.1/10

Tom and Jerry in War of the Whiskers received "mixed or average" reviews on all platforms, according to review aggregator website Metacritic. Famitsu gave it a score of two sixes, one five, and one four for a total of 21 out of 40.
