= Tom and Jerry: The Fast and the Furry =

2005 American animated film

- DVD cover
- Directed by: Bill Kopp
- Screenplay by: Bill Kopp
- Story by: Joseph Barbera
- Based on: Tom and Jerry by: William Hanna; Joseph Barbera
- Produced by: Stephen Fossatti
- Starring: Charlie Adler; Jeff Glen Bennett; John DiMaggio; Jess Harnell; Tom Kenny; Bill Kopp; Tress MacNeille; Rob Paulsen; Billy West
- Edited by: Julie Lau
- Music by: Nathan Wang
- Production companies: Turner Entertainment Co. Warner Bros. Animation (Note: Animation outsourced to Hanho Heung-Up and Yearim Productions.)
- Distributed by: Kidtoon Films (Theatrical); Warner Home Video
- Release dates: September 3, 2005 (Theatrical); October 11, 2005 (Home media)
- Running time: 75 minutes
- Country: United States
- Language: English

Tom and Jerry: The Fast and the Furry is a 2005 American animated action-adventure racing comedy film featuring the cat-and-mouse duo Tom and Jerry. Produced by Warner Bros. Animation and Turner Entertainment Co., it is the third made-for-video Tom and Jerry film. Alongside Tom and Jerry: Blast Off to Mars (also written and directed by Bill Kopp), the release of the film coincided with the 65th anniversary of the cat-and-mouse team's debut in 1940.

The Fast and the Furry was first released theatrically in selected cities of the United States by Kidtoon Films on September 3, 2005. The film was then released on both VHS (making it the final Tom and Jerry film to be released in that format) and DVD on October 11, 2005, and on Blu-ray on April 5, 2011.

== Plot ==
Tom (voiced by Bill Kopp) and Jerry are evicted from their house by Tom's owner after they destroy it during one of their usual chases. Upon seeing an ad for the "Fabulous Super Race", a reality race show, they build their vehicles from a junkyard before heading to Globwobbler Studios in Hollywood, California, and entering themselves in the race.

The other racers in the line include elderly Grammy and her pet dog Squirty; dark lord and florist Gorthan; superstar Steed Dirkly; single mother of four Soccer Mom; and scientist Dr. Professor, the latter eliminating himself before the race after antimatter accidentally vaporizes him and his vehicle.

The race begins in Hollywood, where Grammy takes an early lead, but Steed overtakes her late in the leg. Upon the racers arriving at the finish line in Mexico, the head of Globwobbler Studios, Jacques "J.W." Wren, decides to extend the race to the Amazonian jungle due to high public ratings.

During the race through the jungle, Tom switches a sign indicating the road the racers should take, hoping to get Jerry eliminated. However, his tactic results in the elimination of Soccer Mom as her minivan sinks into quicksand. She informs Jerry of which path to take, allowing him to continue racing. Steed wins again, while Grammy follows him in second, but J.W. still wants to continue due to the high ratings. The next leg of the race will begin in Antarctica, and the racers will have to modify their vehicles for ocean travel.

On the way to Antarctica, Steed's vehicle sinks, causing his elimination before he falls for a mermaid on an island, who is actually a sea monster who proceeds to feed him to her offspring. The first contestant to reach Antarctica is Gorthan, also eliminated after hosts Biff Buzzard and Buzz Blister goad him into licking a metal pole. He is left adrift with his vehicle on an iceberg while struggling to free his tongue.

As Tom, Jerry, and Grammy arrive, Grammy is eliminated when a whale accidentally swallows her and Squirty, thanks to Tom's machinations. J.W. then notifies the hosts that the racers will have to modify their vehicles again for underwater travel to Australia. While racing underwater, Tom faces problems. Seals take over his car, and his fish juice spray attracts sharks, ultimately eliminating him when he crashes into a concrete block and an anchor crushes him.

Upon arriving in Australia, Jerry continues racing across the country to Borneo, where the finish line got reassigned. Grammy and Squirty return to the race when the whale spits them out. Tom also returns after J.W.'s assistant Irving rescues him under J.W.'s orders and saws Australia in half to get in the lead before a kangaroo knocks him out for what he did.

The next leg of the race involves the racers modifying their vehicles with balloons for air travel to Borneo. During the leg, Tom inadvertently pops Grammy's balloons while attempting to attack Jerry, resulting in Grammy's elimination once again when she and Squirty fall to their deaths upon bickering over what they thought was a parachute. J.W. then announces the true final leg of the race, which will involve them traveling back to Hollywood with jet planes in only five minutes due to the race taking too long.

Therefore, Tom and Jerry proceed anyway and race through Asia, Europe, the Atlantic, and the U.S., causing damage to numerous monuments, such as the Great Wall of China and Saint Basil's Cathedral, in the process. Their jets crumble and shatter near the finish line, with Tom and Jerry finishing the race in a tie.

Although they both technically won, J.W. claims that, according to the contract, if a tie occurred, a tiebreaker would have to take place through another race. Not wanting to go through the entire ordeal again, Tom and Jerry attack him and seize the mansion's keys before walking away. Angry and disoriented, J.W. then declares that Hollywood stands for family entertainment. The pharaoh-like President of Hollywood appears to eliminate J.W. for his inappropriate change of heart, while Irving becomes the new head of Globwobbler Studios.

As for Tom and Jerry, they share their new mansion peacefully for a moment, until Tom's owner shows up and takes possession of the mansion as compensation for them destroying her old one. She immediately tells Tom to chase Jerry after seeing the latter, reigniting their rivalry.

== Voice cast ==
- Bill Kopp as Tom Cat and Frank
- John DiMaggio as J.W. Globwobbler and Spike the Bulldog
- Charlie Adler as Grammy
- Jeff Bennett as Steed Dirkly and TV Announcer
- Jess Harnell as Buzz Blister and Film Director
- Tom Kenny as Gorthan the Destroyer of Light & Whale
- Tress MacNeille as Mallory "Soccer Mom" McDoogle, Tour Girl and Tom's Owner
- Rob Paulsen as Irving and Dave
- Billy West as Biff Buzzard, President of Hollywood and Squirty
- J. Grant Albrecht as Clown-O and Security Guard
- Thom Pinto as Computer Voice and Guard
- Neil Ross as Dr. Professor and Director

== Production ==
According to Bill Kopp, the film's director and writer (and voice of Tom), the film was conceived and scripted in 2003 alongside Tom and Jerry: Blast Off to Mars, with work on the film's animation taking place between November 2003 and March 2005.

=== Widescreen ===
This was the second Tom and Jerry film to be filmed in widescreen and the first one to be filmed in the high-definition format, although the Region 1 DVD and the U.S. version of Boomerang were in full screen (cropping the left and right of the image), though not pan and scan as the camera stays directly in the center of the image. Like other films and television series filmed in widescreen, the monitor the animation team would have worked from would have 16:9 and 4:3 safe areas so that the full screen version would not crop off too much of the important visual elements (such as characters). However, the film is broadcast in widescreen on Cartoon Network in the United States and released in widescreen on the Region A Blu-ray.

== Reception ==
Renee Schonfeld of Common Sense Media gave the film two stars out of five, saying "Unlike some of the wittier spoofs Tom & Jerry have starred in, this one is less clever and more straightforwardly devoted to thrills and spills."

== Follow-up film ==
Tom and Jerry: Shiver Me Whiskers was released on August 22, 2006.
