= NewKidCo =

Defunct American video game publisher

NewKidCo LLC
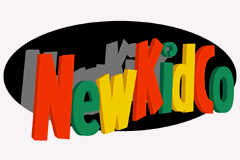
- Type: Subsidiary
- Founded: 1997
- Defunct: 2005
- Fate: Closed
- Products: Video game
- Parent: NewKidCo International Inc. (1998–2005)

NewKidCo LLC was an American video game publisher of children's titles based on popular licensed characters, for Sony, Nintendo and Microsoft consoles. The company was a subsidiary of NewKidCo International Inc. (TSE: NKC; OTC BB: NKCIF).

NewKidCo had subsidiary offices in Burlington, Massachusetts and Midtown Manhattan, New York City. At a later point, it was headquartered in Midtown Manhattan, with its only office being there.

== History ==
NewKidCo Holdings, LLC was formed as a start-up company in 1997 by Henry Kaplan and Jonathan D. Harber, the latter being the former CEO of fellow video game publisher Hi Tech Expressions, with Harber also having worked for the company. Shortly afterwards, the company secured a licensing deal with Children's Television Workshop to publish Sesame Street games for the PlayStation. This was done though Kaplan's long-time partnership with the organization.

On April 21, 1998, NewKidCo Holdings, LLC announced that they had entered into a joint venture with Alpha Software Corporation, a subsidiary of SoftQuad International Inc. to secure game publishing rights; of which Alpha Software would own a majority stake in the business. On the same day, the venture announced that the Sesame Street titles would release in the Fall of 1998. The joint-venture with Alpha Software was finalized on June 10 as NewKidCo LLC, with Alpha holding 75% in the combined company. SoftQuad International soon announced a possible diversion of its hardware assets to focus strictly on video games. At E3 1998, the company secured its third license: Tiny Toon Adventures with the announcement of Tiny Toon Adventures: Buster and the Beanstalk. SoftQuad International was delisted from the NASDAQ on October 9, and on November 10, they had entirely sold SoftQuad Inc.'s assets to private investors and management, sending the company private. This completed the international division's move to children's video games and were renamed NewKidCo International Inc. Prior to that, the company began releasing games for the Game Boy Color with Elmo' ABCs and Elmo's 123s.

In March 1999, The Learning Company (later Mattel Interactive) secured North American distribution rights to NewKidCo's titles in North America. These rights expired in July 2000 when NewKidCo decided to open up their own distribution network.

At E3 1999, the company entered the Nintendo 64 market with enhanced ports of Elmo's Letter Adventure and Elmo's Number Journey, as well as a Game Boy Color tie-in game to the film The Adventures of Elmo in Grouchland. The company also secured a license to release video games based on Hello Kitty from Sanrio. On June 15, NewKidCo International Inc. purchased out NewKidCo Holdings LLC's 25% share in NewKidCo LLC, becoming a fully owned subsidiary. On October 7, the company entered into a publishing deal with Disney Interactive to release titles based on the Winnie the Pooh franchise, as well as a PlayStation port of Disney's Animated Storybook: Mulan. On December 18, the company secured a license from Sony Pictures Family Entertainment Group to release Dragon Tales video games.

At E3 2000, the company secured the E.T. license from Universal Pictures and Amblin Entertainment and Tom & Jerry from Warner Bros. Interactive Entertainment. In July 2000, Ubi Soft signed a publishing deal with the company to allow them to release the company's titles in PAL region territories. The partnership was extended in January 2001.

In April 2002, NewKidCo signed a deal with Nickelodeon to release games based on Dora the Explorer. In November 2002, the company signed a new North American distribution deal with Jack of All Games. Leveraging by their distribution deal, NewKidCo and Take-Two Interactive decided to start co-publishing games shortly before the company shut down. One of the co-published games, Dora the Explorer: Super Spies, went through Gotham Games, the others Dora the Explorer: Barnyard Buddies and the Game Boy Advance version of Dragon Tales: Dragon Adventures was co-published by Global Star Software.

== Games ==
Title	Platform(s)	Developer(s)	Year(s)
Tiny Toon Adventures: The Great Beanstalk	PlayStation	Terraglyph Interactive Studios	1998
Sesame Street: Elmo's Letter Adventure	Nintendo 64, PlayStation	Realtime Associates	1998 (PS); 1999 (N64)
Sesame Street: Elmo's Number Journey	Nintendo 64, PlayStation	Realtime Associates	1998 (PS); 1999 (N64)
Disney's Story Studio: Mulan	PlayStation	Revolution Software	1999
Hello Kitty's Cube Frenzy	Game Boy Color, PlayStation	Culture Publishers (PlayStation); Torus Games (Game Boy Color)	1999
Sesame Street: The Adventures of Elmo in Grouchland	Game Boy Color	Bonsai Interactive Corporation	1999
Sesame Street: Elmo's 123s	Game Boy Color	Bonsai Entertainment	1999
Sesame Street: Elmo's ABCs	Game Boy Color	Bonsai Entertainment	1999
Doug's Big Game	Game Boy Color	ImaginEngine/Magellan Interactive	2000
Dragon Tales: Dragon Seek	PlayStation	Zed Two Game Design Studio	2000
Dragon Tales: Dragon Wings	Game Boy Color	Zed Two Game Design Studio	2000
Tigger's Honey Hunt	Nintendo 64, PlayStation	Doki Denki Studio	2000
Tom and Jerry in Fists of Furry	Nintendo 64, Windows	VIS Entertainment	2000
Tom and Jerry in House Trap	PlayStation	Warthog Games	2000
Tom and Jerry in Mouse Attacks!	Game Boy Color	Warthog Games	2000
Winnie the Pooh: Adventures in the 100 Acre Wood	Game Boy Color	TOSE	2000
Dragon Tales: Dragon Adventures	Game Boy Color	Handheld Games	2001
E.T.: Digital Companion	Game Boy Color	Powerhead Games	2001
E.T.: Escape from Planet Earth	Game Boy Color	Saffire	2001
E.T. the Extra-Terrestrial	Game Boy Advance	Fluid Studios	2001
Goofy's Fun House	PlayStation	The Code Monkeys	2001
Sesame Street Sports	Game Boy Color, PlayStation	Bonsai Interactive Corporation (GBC); Realtime Associates (PlayStation)	2001
E.T.: Away from Home	PC	Lexis Numérique	2002
E.T.: Interplanetary Mission	PC, PlayStation	Lexis Numérique (PC); Digital Eclipse Software (PlayStation)	2002
E.T.: Phone Home Adventure	PC	Lexis Numérique	2002
E.T. and the Cosmic Garden	Game Boy Color	Zed Two Game Design Studio	2002
Little League Baseball 2002	Game Boy Advance	Handheld Games	2002
Muppet Pinball Mayhem	Game Boy Advance	Digital Eclipse	2002
Tom and Jerry: The Magic Ring	Game Boy Advance	Cave+Barn Studios	2002
Droopy's Tennis Open	Game Boy Advance	Warthog Games	2002
Tom and Jerry in Infurnal Escape	Game Boy Advance	CinéGroupe	2002
Dora the Explorer: The Search for Pirate Pig's Treasure	Game Boy Advance	CinéGroupe	2002
Tom and Jerry in War of the Whiskers	GameCube, PlayStation 2, Xbox	VIS Entertainment	2002 (PS2); 2003 (NGC/Xbox)
Dr. Seuss: Green Eggs and Ham	Game Boy Advance	Handheld Games	2003
Dr. Seuss: The Cat in the Hat	PlayStation	DC Studios	2004
The Cat in the Hat	Game Boy Advance	Game Titan	2005

=== Canceled ===
- Droopy's Miniature Golf (Game Boy Advance)
- E.T.: Return to the Green Planet (PlayStation 2)
- E.T.: Salerian Project (Game Boy Advance)
- E.T.: Search for Dragora (GameCube, Xbox)
- Little League Baseball 2002 (GameCube)
- The Super-Stoo-Pendus World of Dr. Seuss (Game Boy Advance)
- U.S. Youth Soccer: Power-Up Soccer (Game Boy Advance)
