= The Alley Cat (1941 film) =

- Directed by: Hugh Harman
- Starring: Harry E. Lang; Sara Berner; Billy Bletcher; The Sportsmen Quartet
- Music by: Scott Bradley
- Color process: Technicolor
- Production company: MGM Cartoons
- Distributed by: Metro-Goldwyn-Mayer
- Release date: July 5, 1941
- Running time: 9 minutes
- Language: English

The Alley Cat is a 1941 American animated short film released by Metro-Goldwyn-Mayer. Directed by Hugh Harman, the film centers on Butch, and Toodles Galore, who were subsequently integrated as recurring characters into the Tom and Jerry series of shorts (start in Baby Puss (1943)).

== Plot ==
Butch is a black male alley cat who is instantly smitten with Toodles, a gorgeous, white female cat he sees on the balcony of her wealthy family's penthouse apartment on Park Avenue. He serenades her, but the butler sends the family's bulldog Rover after him.

A long, fast-paced chase ensues, with Rover being outwitted by Butch every time, and the chase ends with the butler accidentally hitting Rover with a broom when the dog chases Butch, causing Rover to turn against the butler out of anger. Once Rover and the butler are out of the way, Butch makes it into the apartment to dance with his new love.
