= Tom and Jerry: Blast Off to Mars =

- DVD cover
- Directed by: Bill Kopp
- Written by: Bill Kopp
- Based on: Tom and Jerry by: William Hanna; Joseph Barbera
- Produced by: Tom Minton
- Starring: Jeff Glen Bennett; Corey Burton; Kathryn Fiore; Brad Garrett; Jess Harnell; Tom Kenny; Rob Paulsen; Frank Welker; Billy West
- Edited by: Ken Solomon
- Music by: Julie Bernstein; Steven Bernstein
- Production companies: Turner Entertainment Co. Warner Bros. Animation (Note: Animation outsourced to Toon City.)
- Distributed by: Warner Home Video
- Release date: January 18, 2005
- Running time: 75 minutes
- Countries: United States; Philippines
- Language: English

Tom and Jerry: Blast Off to Mars is a 2005 American animated science fiction comedy-adventure film starring the cat-and-mouse duo Tom and Jerry. Produced by Warner Bros. Animation and Turner Entertainment Co., it is the second made-for-video Tom and Jerry film.

The film was released on DVD and VHS on January 18, 2005, and on Blu-ray on October 16, 2012. Alongside Tom and Jerry: The Fast and the Furry (also written and directed by Bill Kopp), the release of the film coincided with the 65th anniversary of the cat-and-mouse team's debut in 1940. It is Joseph Barbera's first solo Tom and Jerry work without his partner William Hanna, who died on March 22, 2001.

== Plot ==
Tom chases Jerry as usual from their house and across town until they arrive at the "International Space Place," where astronauts Buzz Blister and Biff Buzzard are heading to Mars. In the process, Tom and Jerry are caught during the speech (first misunderstood as aliens due to Tom getting hit by green paint backstage) and the staff try to capture them, but only Tom is caught and thrown out.

During the testing of dehydrated food, Jerry knocks over a cup in the process, resulting in the food going all over the place in an explosion. Soon, the staff tries to catch Jerry, but figuring that only Tom can catch him, they bring him back to the base and give him a mission to eliminate Jerry. During the chase, the duo land onto a rocket, ending up at Mars, where Tom and Jerry are left behind.

A green female alien named Peep along with an alien dog Ubu and three more Martians arrive, to which Jerry is then taken to the Martians' lair where he is mistaken for the "Great Gloop." After much calamity and a discovery that Jerry is not the Great Gloop, Tom, Jerry, and Peep hijack a flying saucer so that they can get back to Earth and warn everyone about a potential attack by the Martians. They manage to stop them, but a gigantic orange vacuum cleaner robot named the "Invince-a-tron" eventually arrives at Earth and begins to suck everyone up with its vacuum. Tom, Jerry, and Peep ultimately foil the Invince-a-tron by using a bone to get Spike into its brain and make it malfunction, destroying it.

In the aftermath, Tom and Jerry are rewarded with a Hummer by the U.S. President for saving Earth from being destroyed by the Invince-a-tron. Before they could even drive it, however, they are attacked once again by a newly repaired Invince-a-tron controlled by Spike as revenge on Tom and Jerry for the destruction of his bone. Peep flies in the flying saucer and rescues Jerry, but leaves Tom behind to be chased by the Spike-controlled Invince-a-tron. In the epilogue, Biff and Buzz are cleaning the mess as punishment for lying that there is no life on Mars; they soon start to argue and fight about it as a horrified Tom is still being pursued by the Spike-controlled Invince-a-tron into the sunset.

== Voice cast ==
- Bill Kopp as Tom Cat, Jerry Mouse, and Press Guy #1
- Kathryn Fiore as Peep and Press Girl
- Frank Welker as Spike the Bulldog and Ubu
- Jeff Bennett as Dr. Gluckman, Martian Guard #1, and President
- Corey Burton as Martian Scientist, Court Attendant, and Eyes at the Gate
- Brad Garrett as Commander Bristle and Martian Guard #3
- Jess Harnell as Buzz Blister, Martian General, and Worker #3
- Tom Kenny as Grob, Martian Guard #2, and Gardener #1
- Rob Paulsen as Computer Voice, Boy, Worker #1, and Worker #2
- Billy West as Biff Buzzard, King Thingg, and Gardener #2

== Production ==
According to Bill Kopp, the film's director and writer, the film was conceived and scripted in 2003 alongside Tom and Jerry: The Fast and the Furry; the film was announced by Business Wire on November 22, 2004. The film was animated and produced by Toon City in Philippines.

=== Widescreen ===
This was the first Tom and Jerry film to be filmed in widescreen and the first one to be filmed in the high-definition format, although the Region 1 DVD and the American version of Boomerang were in full screen (cropping the left and right of the image), though not pan and scan as the camera stays directly in the center of the image. Like television shows filmed in high-definition and other films filmed in high-definition, the monitor the animation team would have worked from would have 16:9 and 4:3 safe areas so that the full screen version would not crop off too much of any important visual elements (such as characters). However, the film is broadcast in widescreen on Cartoon Network in the United States and released in widescreen on the Region A Blu-ray.

== Reception ==
The film received a negative review from Radio Times, which gave the film a two-star review and said "the characters are drawn a little too sharply, and the running time is just too long for the pacing that made the original shorts so perfect". Screen Rant has listed the film as one of the worst Tom and Jerry movies ever made, saying "The plot is fairly convoluted with the journey to and the journey from Mars feeling like they could have been made into two separate films which is likely why it received a lower score". Writing in 2016 in the book "Mars in the Movies: A History", Thomas Miller described it as "utterly pointless".

Internationally, the film was also reviewed poorly. The Norwegian newspaper Dagbladet said that "the first five minutes of this movie, in which Tom & Jerry ravage a regular kitchen, are much better than the trip to Mars with all its consequences". The German film review website MDPress gave the film 6/10, criticising the film's lack of logic even in the context of a children's cartoon.

Conversely, Renee Schonfeld of Common Sense Media gave it a positive review, rating it 3 out of 5 stars and saying "This franchise entry is funnier than some and has a wittier, more well-developed story than most."

== Follow-up film ==
Tom and Jerry: The Fast and the Furry was released on October 11, 2005.
