= Tom and Jerry in Fists of Furry =

2000 video game

- North American cover art for Nintendo 64
- Developer: VIS Interactive
- Publishers: NA: NewKidCo; PAL: Ubi Soft
- Platforms: Nintendo 64; Microsoft Windows
- Release: NA: November 8, 2000; EU: November 12, 2000
- Genre: Fighting
- Modes: Single-player, multiplayer

Tom and Jerry in Fists of Furry is a fighting video game for the Nintendo 64 and Microsoft Windows. It was developed by VIS Interactive and published by NewKidCo and by Ubi Soft in PAL region. It is based on the animated short film series of Tom and Jerry.

== Gameplay ==
Tom's fighting pose

Tom and Jerry in Fists of Furry features 10 levels, each with themes like the kitchen from the Tom and Jerry TV show and a boxing ring. With gameplay based on slapstick comedy, players interact with the environment and scattered usable objects like chairs, pool cues, and bombs. Each of the seven characters have unique attacks. Power-ups include invincibility to items (but not to punches or the stage hazards), or a green gas which can contaminate a touched opponent.

Initially, only Tom and Jerry are available as playable characters; by completing the game with each character, players can unlock Butch, Duckling, Tuffy, Spike and Tyke.

== Development and release ==
Development began in late 1999, and was in final submission to Nintendo of America by August 2000. Team members had chosen Nintendo 64 due to its library's lack of fighting games. They wanted to simplify controls for all age groups, so they chose to forgo the typical combination moves. Toodles Galore was planned to be a playable character, but was cut during development. All voices in the game were provided by Alan Marriott. The game was released on Nintendo 64, in North America on November 8, 2000, published by NewKidCo and Mattel Interactive, and in Europe on November 12, 2000, by Ubi Soft.

== Reception ==
Reception

Review scores
Publication	Score	
Publication	N64	PC
GameSpot	6.6/10	
IGN	6.8/10	
N64 Magazine	35%	
Nintendo Power	8.3/10	
Actu & Soluces 64	81%	
Game Vortex		65%

IGN briefly played a pre-release demonstration of the Nintendo 64 version, calling it a clone of Power Stone (1999), with a disappointing lack of four-player fighting. IGN later rated it 6.8/10, calling it "the next best fighter on the system" after Super Smash Bros. (1999), saying that it would have been better received if it had been released first. Ryan Davis of GameSpot rated it "fair" at 6.6/10, calling the game challenging but also accessible to younger players. He praised the controls but criticized the difficulty balance. N64 Magazine rated it 35%, and said the game is to be avoided because the high-quality Tom and Jerry franchise was "let down by lazy and cack-handed execution", especially because of a "brain-numbing punch-punch-kick-style combo" instead of any special attacks. They said that the characters were not drawn badly and that the locations from the cartoons were a plus. Nintendo Power gave an 8.3/10 rating and said it was the best 3D fighting game for Nintendo 64, due to the multiplayer elements, interactive fighting environments, and precision controls. The French magazine Actu & Soluces 64 rated it at 81%.

Game Vortex played the Windows version, rated it at 65%, was disappointed, criticized the total lack of music, and recommended a gamepad to mimic the preferred Nintendo 64 version.

== Sequel ==
In 2002, Tom and Jerry in War of the Whiskers was released for the PlayStation 2, GameCube, and Xbox, and the latter two are North American exclusives. It is the only NewKidCo game to receive a T rating.
