= The Tom and Jerry Cartoon Kit =

1962 film by Gene Deitch

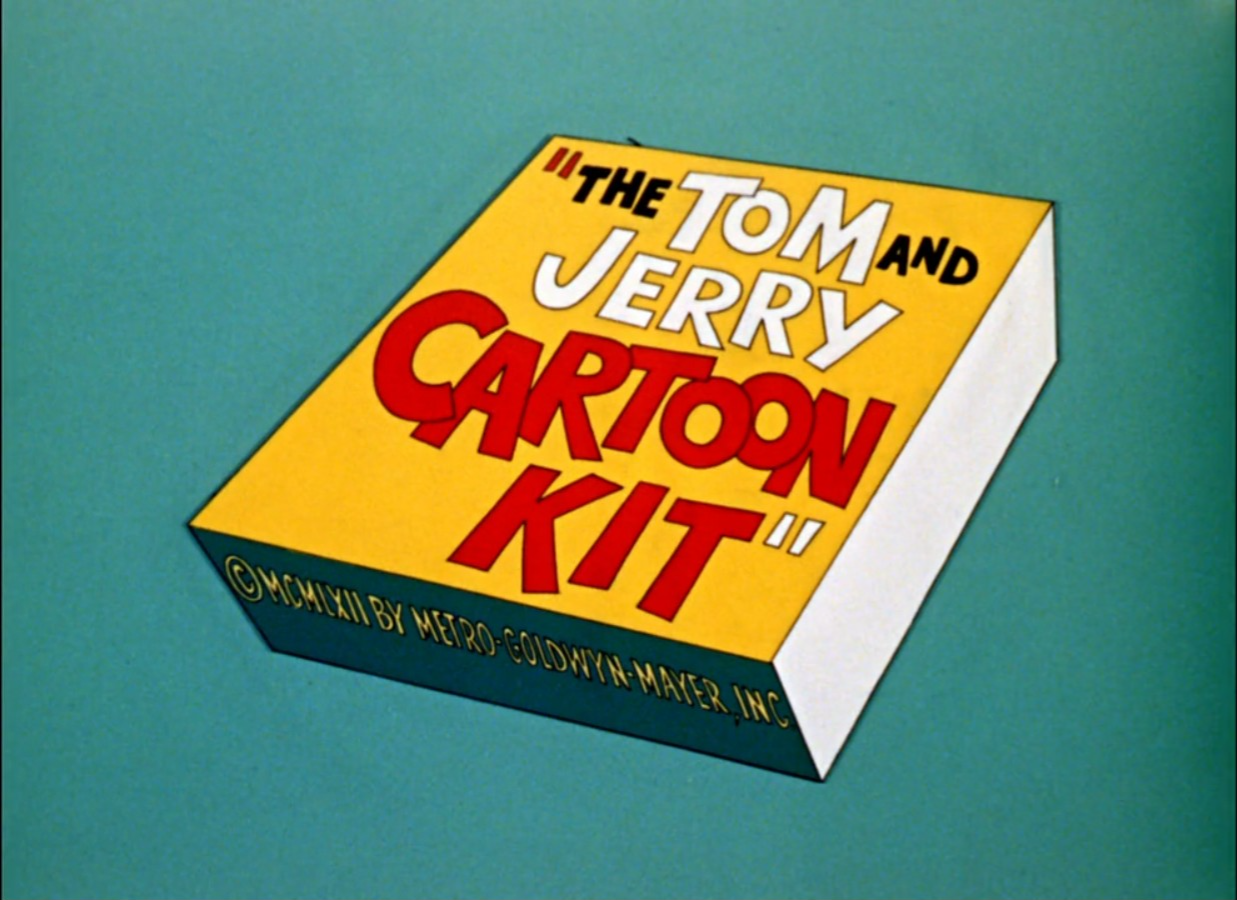
- The title card of The Tom and Jerry Cartoon Kit.
- Directed by: Gene Deitch; Animation direction: Václav Bedřich
- Story by: Chris Jenkyns
- Produced by: William L. Snyder
- Starring: Allen Swift
- Music by: Steven Konichek
- Animation by: Uncredited animation: Jindřích Bárta; Antonín Bureš; Mirek Kačena; Milan Klikar; Věra Kudrnová; Věra Marešová; Olga Šišková; Zdeňka Skřípková; Zdeněk Smetana; Checking: Ludmila Kopečná (uncredited)
- Backgrounds by: Background paint: Bohumil Šiška (uncredited); Assistant background paint: Miluše Hluchanicová (uncredited)
- Color process: Metrocolor
- Production company: Rembrandt Films
- Distributed by: Metro-Goldwyn-Mayer
- Release date: August 10, 1962
- Running time: 6:39
- Countries: United States; Czechoslovakia
- Language: English

The Tom and Jerry Cartoon Kit is the 123rd episode in the Tom and Jerry animated action comedy short films, produced and released on August 10, 1962. It was the ninth cartoon in a series of thirteen to be directed by Gene Deitch and produced by William L. Snyder in Czechoslovakia. It updates its copyright to the current year 1962 as opposed to the 1961 copyright of Dicky Moe.

The Tom and Jerry Cartoon Kit is a sarcastic attack on the series as a whole and its formulaic approach, which the short mocks as excessively violent and designed solely for profit. Deitch had strongly divergent views on animation compared to Tom and Jerry's creators, William Hanna and Joseph Barbera, that he openly expressed throughout his lifetime.

The film has a martial arts theme. Jerry Mouse and Tom Cat train in judo and then hold a breaking contest, in which each tries to outdo the other.

== Plot ==
The cartoon begins with a demonstration for the Tom and Jerry Cartoon Kit, with which "anyone can now enter the lucrative field of animated cartoons". The items in the kit include the following:

- "One mean, stupid cat" (Tom)
- "One sweet, lovable mouse" (Jerry)
- "Assorted deadly weapons" (a knife, a hammer, and a stick of dynamite)
- Coffee and cigarettes (removed from the kit and described as being "for the cartoonists")
- A slice of watermelon

The narrator says, "First, put the sweet, lovable mouse into a simple situation expressing a natural human need, such as eating a slice of watermelon contained in our kit. The result may not make sense, but it will last long enough for you to be comfortably seated before the feature begins." This statement refers to the original theatrical exhibition of the cartoon, which ran ahead of a feature film.

At first, Jerry eats the watermelon on the table and spits the seeds out, hitting and waking Tom, who initially grabs the hammer to attempt to hit Jerry, but instead flicks him on the back of his head. Jerry swallows the seeds by accident, causing him to turn green for a moment and then make sounds like a shaker when he moves and goes into a lively dance until Tom traps him in a metal can. Tom uses Jerry as a maraca for his own dance; when the effect suddenly stops, Tom peeks inside only to get a mouthful of seeds spat into his face. Outraged, he devours the rest of the watermelon and turns his head into a cannon to fire blasts of seeds at Jerry, who takes cover in the kit box just before Tom hits it, damaging it and destroying the stick of dynamite.

The knife included in the kit sticks in the floor, barely missing Jerry, who begins to teach himself judo from a book that has landed nearby. He emerges with enough fighting skill to easily overpower Tom, even after the latter undergoes boxing training and then tries to attack with the knife. Tom eventually attends a judo school in order to face Jerry on even terms. The two then hold a breaking contest, in which each tries to outdo the other: Jerry with a wooden board, Tom with a brick, then Jerry again with a cement block. When Tom tries to break a huge block of marble, the bricks holding it up fracture and it crashes through the floor, taking him with it.

An unconscious Tom ends up in the battered box. Jerry replaces the lid as the narrator concludes, "Our next film will be for the kiddies, and will demonstrate a new poison gas. Thank you and good night." The wording on the lid has changed to read "The End – An MGM Cartoon." The music winds to a stop as if being played on a slowing phonograph record, and Jerry bows to the audience before the screen fades to black.

== Reception ==
While the Deitch shorts were generally negatively received by Tom and Jerry fans, this particular short is often considered one of the best of the thirteen cartoons, due to its inventive plotline and satirical nature.

== See also ==
- List of American films of 1962
