= Calypso Cat =

- The title card of Calypso Cat
- Directed by: Gene Deitch; Animation direction: Václav Bedřich
- Story by: Larz Bourne
- Produced by: William L. Snyder
- Music by: Steven Konichek
- Animation by: Jindra Barta; Antonín Bures; Mirek Kacena; Milan Klikar; Vera Kudrnová; Vera Maresová; Olga Sisková; Zdenka Skrípková; Zdenek Smetana (all uncredited); Checking: Ludmila Kopecná (uncredited)
- Backgrounds by: Background paint: Bohumil Siska (uncredited); Assistant background paint: Miluse Hluchanicová (uncredited)
- Color process: Metrocolor
- Production company: Rembrandt Films
- Distributed by: Metro-Goldwyn-Mayer
- Release date: June 9, 1962
- Running time: 8:00
- Countries: United States; Czechoslovakia
- Language: English

Calypso Cat is a Tom and Jerry animated comedy short film, produced in 1961 and released on June 9, 1962. It was the seventh of the thirteen cartoons in the series to be directed by Gene Deitch and produced by William L. Snyder in Czechoslovakia.

While the Deitch shorts were generally negatively-received by Tom and Jerry fans, this particular short is often considered one of the best of the thirteen cartoons. This is due to its love triangle that harkens back to the Hanna-Barbera era, as well as the background art and the calypso-flavored soundtrack.

The film is primarily set on a ship, with Tom Cat and Jerry Mouse as stowaways. Tom has fallen in love with a female Persian cat and tries to court her. Jerry is following them, and tries to sabotage their potential relationship.

== Plot ==
While chasing Jerry around a dock Tom sees and instantly falls in love with a female cat. The female cat appears to return Tom's interest, so Tom sneaks aboard the ship the female cat and her owner have just boarded.

Jerry follows Tom onto the boat and proceeds to interfere with Tom's subsequent flirtations. On board the ship, Tom gives the Persian cat a tray of refreshments, but the mouse intends to cause trouble by booting the bench the female cat is sitting on as she begins to enjoy the refreshments on the tray. Then, when the refreshments are dumped on her (by Jerry collapsing her chair), and Tom trips and falls on her when getting a wet towel, the Persian cat gets annoyed and bangs the tray onto Tom's head so that it turns the shape of a bell.

Now the Persian cat plans on ignoring Tom, but Tom decides to certify her with something else. Just then, the second trouble Jerry is trying to give is to put a bouquet of flowers in a fire hose's water spraying space and switch on the water tap so that once Tom gives the bouquet to the female cat, she will be soaked while smelling the bouquet. After getting splashed, the furious Persian cat smacks Tom with her fist, leaving him with a hanging nose.

He dashes after the female cat down the steps at the edge of the ship, pleading for forgiveness but she seems to be paying no attention to him. Tom holds the Persian cat's hand trying a reason to get along with her but she continues to leave. Jerry then tricks Calypso cat into assaulting Tom by hitting the steel drum with a rock (Calypso cat thought Tom had kicked it). Obviously, Tom retaliates and the two start to fight each other, using the drums sticks and steel drum as weapons. Tom loses the fight when Calypso cat slams the drum onto Tom and turns him into a turtle, as Tom comes out of his shell, and Calypso cat proceeds to walk off, Tom runs around and around and spins around on his shell, and Jerry laughs and laughs himself silly, accompanied by the female cat, making Tom heartbroken.

Jerry then sets Tom's feet on fire to get his attention, and Tom, now realizing that Jerry sabotaged his potential relationship, proceeds to chase Jerry back onto the ship in a crazed fury. The ship arrives back at the dock where it had been at the start, and the chase continues on the dock. Despite being chased by Tom, Jerry is smiling through the camera for the closing as if it was all worth it.

== Production ==
In scoring the Tom and Jerry series, upcoming composer Steven Konichek "found a way forwards" through "avoiding old-style chase music" and "concentrating on atmospheric underscoring" in the Deitch shorts; his cues in this particular cartoon have been described as "dissonantly jazzy".
