= Tom and Jerry: The Gene Deitch Collection =

Collection of Tom and Jerry cartoons

- DVD cover
- Directed by: Gene Deitch
- Starring: Tom Cat; Jerry Mouse
- Distributed by: Warner Home Video
- Release date: June 2, 2015
- Country: United States

Tom and Jerry: The Gene Deitch Collection is a one-disc DVD collection of animated short cartoons starring Tom and Jerry, all directed by Gene Deitch and released in 1961–62. It was released on June 2, 2015, in Region 1.

This collection brought all 13 of the Gene Deitch Tom and Jerry cartoons together for the first time on DVD (on Region 1), along with two documentaries.

These are the same 13 cartoons that appear on European DVD collection in PAL format, Tom and Jerry: The Classic Collection, Vol. 5., released in August 2004, albeit presented restored and remastered in the set, as opposed to the Turner TV broadcast prints used in the 2004 UK DVD.

== Disc contents ==
=== 1961 ===
- 01 Switchin' Kitten
- 02 Down and Outing
- 03 It's Greek to Me-ow!

=== 1962 ===
- 04 High Steaks
- 05 Mouse into Space
- 06 Landing Stripling
- 07 Calypso Cat
- 08 Dicky Moe
- 09 The Tom and Jerry Cartoon Kit
- 10 Tall in the Trap
- 11 Sorry Safari
- 12 Buddies Thicker Than Water
- 13 Carmen Get It!

== Bonus features ==
- Tom and Jerry...and Gene: The Rembrandt Years (which contains a newly shot interview with Deitch discussing his work on the series and how he and his foreign team of animators continued to crank out these cartoons on a much smaller budget due to the studio changes.)
- Much Ado About Tom and Jerry (released on the Deluxe Anniversary Collection)
