= Mouse into Space =

1962 film by Gene Deitch

- Title card
- Directed by: Gene Deitch; Animation direction: Václav Bedřich
- Story by: Tod Dockstader
- Produced by: William L. Snyder
- Starring: Allen Swift (uncredited)
- Music by: Steven Konichek (uncredited)
- Animation by: Jindra Barta; Antonín Bures; Mirek Kacena; Milan Klikar; Vera Kudrnová; Vera Maresová; Olga Sisková; Zdenka Skrípková; Zdenek Smetana (all uncredited); Checking: Ludmila Kopecná (uncredited)
- Backgrounds by: Background paint: Bohumil Siska (uncredited); Helped by: Miluse Hluchanicová (uncredited)
- Color process: Metrocolor
- Production company: Rembrandt Films
- Distributed by: Metro-Goldwyn-Mayer
- Release date: 1962
- Running time: 6:48
- Countries: United States; Czechoslovakia
- Language: English

Mouse into Space is a Tom and Jerry animated action comedy short film released as early as April 2, 1962 (copyrighted 1961). It was the fifth of the thirteen cartoons in the series to be directed by Gene Deitch and produced by William L. Snyder in Prague, Czechoslovakia.

The film has a theme involving the human spaceflight programs of the 1960s. After narrowly evading a bullet to the head, Jerry Mouse decides to avoid cats by volunteering as an astronaut. Tom Cat is depressed without him and gets intoxicated. Following a number of strange coincidences, Tom accidentally joins Jerry on his first flight into space.

== Plot ==
The short begins with Jerry reading a magazine, in which they announce "that life is much better in space for a mouse" and Tom stealthily places a revolver to Jerry's head and shoots, but Jerry reacts quickly and avoids death. He gets angry and continues reading, but Tom plants a bomb that Jerry pushes out just before it explodes.

Jerry reads that there are no cats in space, so he packs up to head off to space. A sad Tom tries to convince him to stay, putting a hammer, a revolver, and even a bomb on his head, but Jerry ignores him and leaves home, saddening Tom. Jerry enlists as an astro-mouse, and after passing the test, he proceeds to the rocket ship. Tom falls into depression and drinks alcohol on an evening walk, and in his intoxicated state, he sleeps in a tube that was actually the gasoline hose of a rocket.

By night, a fuel truck arrives and a man gets down to connect the hose to the fuel tank of the truck and turns the crank, releasing gasoline into the hose. Tom wakes up from the noise but unfortunately, the gasoline has already drowned him so he tries to swim above, but moments later the astronaut hits the launch button, igniting the gasoline into the fire. Tom climbs above the fire before it reaches him and eventually, the bottommost part of the rocket falls off once the rocket enters space, so Tom manages to survive. But the astronaut hits the number 2 button, so the bottommost parts of the rocket again release fire and fall off, and Tom jumps to the main rocket every time the bottommost part he is standing on falls off until only a small conical capsule remains on the main rocket.

When Tom opens the capsule, he is very happy to see Jerry. He immediately jumps into it, closes the cap, then moves Jerry's chair, making it spin fast. While he laughs incessantly, Tom accidentally presses a button that makes the capsule spin and completely changes its track into a loopy zigzag, and the force of the spinning capsule coupled with a loosely-hinged door easily pushes Tom out of the capsule sending him slowly flying into space due to zero gravity. A different capsule manages to collide with Tom, and when he opens it, he finds a Soviet Bulldog resembling Spike. The frightened Tom flees, but not knowing how to move fast in space, he cannot defend himself from a stampede of moonstones, one of which traps him inside it.

As a lost Jerry navigates the capsule into space, he senses a falling stone, and he turns the capsule, so the pointed tip splits open the moonstone, releasing Tom. Tom fell back to Earth's gravity zone, but as his downward velocity increases a piece of the moonstone stuck to Tom's waist, heats up to such a point that Tom shoots out of the moonstone, but not fast enough to escape the gravity zone, and falls to the earth in pieces in which Jerry laughs at Tom's predicament; as once he realizes that Tom was stuck in the moonstone, it cracked. Jerry's capsule calmly lands in the space center when its in-built parachute activates.

Tom barely reaches home seeing Jerry is proud and jumps through the window with a hammer, gun, and bomb, but he drops those items after instantly noticing that Jerry won a medal for his successful space trip. Tom merrily greets Jerry, and Jerry merrily greets Tom back before asking him to light a cigar for him. Instead of the cigar, Tom treacherously lights his shiny medal to set him on fire and kill him, but it backfires since the medal turns out to function as a jetpack as well, and Jerry now from his medal jetpack gives chase to Tom, forcing him to pack up his belongings and move out of the house. Jerry cheerfully waves farewell to Tom as the cartoon closes.

== Reception ==
In their book The Encyclopedia of Cartoon Superstars: From A to (almost) Z, authors John Calwey and Jim Korkis noted that while the Deitch shorts "were never as funny as the classics, they did have a quirky style all their own", believing that Deitch "was able to maintain the inner side of the characters by having them show occasional feelings". In Mouse into Space, as "one of the more bizarre examples", Tom becomes "so full of despair, that he takes to the bottle!".
