= Kaca =

Kaca may refer to:

- KACA, Kenya Anti-Corruption Authority
- Káča, from Devil and Káča
- A romanization of Kacha (sage)
- Kaća Čelan, Serbian writer, director, theatre and acting expert, professor and actress
- Kaca, Hungarian name of Cața, commune in Brașov County, Transylvania, Romania

== See also ==
- Kac (disambiguation)
