= Alice of Wonderland in Paris =

- Original U.S. film poster
- Directed by: Gene Deitch
- Produced by: William L. Snyder
- Starring: Norma MacMillan; Carl Reiner; Howard Morris; Allen Swift
- Music by: Paul Alter; Václav Lidl
- Production company: Rembrandt Films
- Distributed by: Childhood Productions
- Release date: February 5, 1966
- Running time: 52 minutes
- Countries: Czechoslovakia; United States
- Language: English

Alice of Wonderland in Paris or Alice in a New Wonderland is a 1966 animated film directed by Gene Deitch and produced by William L. Snyder in extreme limited animation.

== Plot ==
Young Alice, having become a celebrity for her adventures in Wonderland, is in her bedroom. She is dreaming about visiting Paris and sharing adventures with the storybook girl Madeline. While no comment is made as to where this Alice comes from or what time the film is set in, Alice seems to be American, as she likes cheeseburgers and is having a great deal of trouble when it comes to getting to France. As Alice points out, “Getting to Wonderland was easy – all I had to do was fall down the rabbit hole. But let’s face it – it takes money to get to Paris!”.

As Alice dreams in her bedroom, a talking mouse named Francois rides a bicycle into Alice's bedroom and wants to conduct a survey about her favorite cheeses. Alice wants to join Francois in his native Paris, so Francois uses a cheese that his company makes, which uses the same magical mushroom she ate in Wonderland as an ingredient, to shrink Alice to the size of a rodent. Together, they ride through Paris, where Francois narrates a series of Parisian themed short stories.

The film includes brief adaptations of five short stories:

- Eve Titus' Anatole
- Ludwig Bemelmans' Madeline and the Bad Hat
- Crockett Johnson's The Frowning Prince
- James Thurber's Many Moons
- Ludwig Bemelmans' Madeline and the Gypsies.

In the end, when Alice finally meets her, it just so turns out that Madeline dreams of being Alice in Wonderland.

== Cast ==
- Norma MacMillan as Alice
- Luce Ennis as Singer
- Howard Morris as Grand Wizard, King (The Frowning Prince), Queen, The Frowning Prince
- Carl Reiner as Anatole, Doucette, M. Duval
- Trinka Snyder as Princess Lenore
- Allen Swift as Francois, Narrator, King (Many Moons), Lord High Chamberlain
- Lionel Wilson as Jester, Royal Mathematician, Royal Wizard, Minstrel

== Production ==
Alice of Wonderland in Paris was created by the team of Gene Deitch and William L. Snyder, who had previously collaborated on Munro, which won the Academy Award for Animated Short Film in 1961. The filmmakers (along with Rembrandt Films) were also responsible for producing the 1960–1962 Tom and Jerry theatrical cartoons for Metro-Goldwyn-Mayer and also were one of the producers of the Popeye animated TV series for King Features Syndicate, aired in syndication between 1960 and 1963.

Attracted to the economy and beauty of Prague, Deitch and Snyder produced cartoons for both cinema release and cartoons based on short stories for school educational film use. Five of these stories were placed in the feature with new Alice sequences to be released as a feature film in the West.

Actors Carl Reiner, Howard Morris and Allen Swift provided the voice performances, and Canadian actress Norma MacMillan provided the voice of Alice.

Alice of Wonderland in Paris runs 52 minutes, which is somewhat short for a feature film release, and it was presented for its 1966 U.S. theatrical distribution on a bill with the short film White Mane. It was originally distributed in the U.S. theaters by a company called Childhood Productions; Paramount Pictures re-released it in 1975 as Alice in a New Wonderland, and White Mane was also part of the bill.
