= The Hobbit (1967 film) =

1967 American animated adaptation of Tolkien novel

- Title screen
- Directed by: Gene Deitch
- Written by: Gene Deitch
- Based on: The Hobbit by J.R.R. Tolkien
- Produced by: William Snyder
- Narrated by: Herb Lass
- Cinematography: Adolf Born
- Music by: Václav Lidl
- Release date: 30 June 1967 (New York)
- Running time: 11 min 42 sec
- Countries: United States; Czechoslovakia
- Language: English

The Hobbit is a 1967 fantasy animated short film by Gene Deitch and the first attempt to adapt J.R.R. Tolkien's 1937 novel The Hobbit (upon which it is loosely based) into a film.

While originally planned as an ambitious full-length adaptation, the short film actually released was an "ashcan copy", created solely to fulfil a contractual obligation and retain the rights and never intended for public exhibition.

At less than twelve minutes, it is also one of the shortest films based on Tolkien's work. It has no connection to the 1977 Rankin/Bass animated film or Peter Jackson's film trilogy.

The film is short and lacking in detail, barely resembling the original story with the exception of the encounter with the trolls (renamed "Gromes") and Bilbo Baggins's encounter with a creature called Golüm. A Princess Mika, described as a "child", is introduced to avoid having Bilbo as a bachelor.

== Plot ==
A dragon named Slag has ravaged a town in Dale called Golden Bells, though General Torin Oakenshield and Princess Mika survive. They ask a wizard, Gandalf, for help; he tells them that the Great Book prophesies Slag's death, for which they must have a Hobbit. They visit Bilbo at his home in Hobbiton; he refuses to help, but Gandalf and Mika persuade him. They set off and meet two Gromes; Bilbo (not Gandalf, who does not come with them) tricks them into fighting each other, and at dawn, the Gromes turn into trees.

Bilbo vanishes from his companions. He has fallen into a hole in the mountains occupied by Grablins, landing in Golüm's lake. He finds Golüm's magic ring and escapes. He crosses Mirkwood and reaches the Lonely Mountain. He manages to steal the Arkenstone from Slag's hoard and uses a bow to shoot it into Slag's heart, killing him. Bilbo marries Mika and they return together to Hobbiton. The narrator ends the story that Gandalf may come back to bring Bilbo on another adventure.

== Production ==
Producer William L. Snyder of Rembrandt Films had the film rights to Tolkien's work from 1964 to 1967 and intended to make a feature-length animated film of The Hobbit, working with Deitch as an animator and Bill Bernal as a writer.

A proposed deal with 20th Century-Fox fell through, but Snyder was nevertheless required to meet his contractual obligation to produce a "full-color film" of The Hobbit by the 30th of June that year or lose his rights to the material (which had grown significantly in value due to a recent increase in interest in the works of Tolkien).

Snyder asked Deitch to make a 12-minute version, quickly and cheaply, purely to fulfil the wording of the contract. As such, this version — which was never intended for public exhibition — has been considered an "ashcan copy" by many including Deitch himself.

The short is only slightly animated; it consists mostly of camera movements over still pictures, with some cut-outs moving on the screen. Rushing through production, Snyder "premiered" the film on June 30, 1967 — the last day before his film rights would expire. He paid people a dime to give back to him, and then came and watched the film in a small Manhattan projection room. He had them sign statements that they had paid to see a Hobbit film, allowing Snyder to retain the rights. He then sold the rights back to Tolkien for approximately $100,000.

The film remained unknown to Tolkien fans until 2012 when Deitch posted about the film's history on his blog. He stated that the film had been produced in 1966, but subsequent document discoveries confirmed that this happened in 1967.

== See also ==
- Limited animation
- The Lord of the Rings – Ralph Bakshi's 1978 animated feature adaptation
- Cutout animation
