= Nudnik =

Czech animated film series

- Directed by: Gene Deitch
- Produced by: William Lawrence Snyder
- Starring: Gene Deitch
- Music by: Ferdinand Havlík
- Backgrounds by: Miluse Hluchanicová
- Production company: Rembrandt Films
- Distributed by: Paramount Studios
- Running time: 4—6 minutes
- Country: Prague

Nudnik is a 1965 Czechoslovak animated short film series directed by Gene Deitch, produced by William L. Snyder, and distributed by Paramount Studios. Twelve shorts were released during 1965 and 1967. The character's tagline is "Whatever can go wrong with Nudnik, will go wrong."

The first cartoon of the series, Here's Nudnik, was nominated for the Academy Award for Best Animated Short Film in 1965, losing to The Pink Phink.

Nudnik was based on a previous Terrytoons character, Foofle, who appeared from 1959 to 1960.

== Synopsis ==
Nudnik contains only one major character, simply named Nudnik. He cannot do anything right; when he does something, it usually ends with disastrous results, and usually gets him in trouble. At first the idea was for each short to be scored with melancholy jazz music, which was done for the first cartoon. However, the studio wasn't pleased with the musical choice, and they made Deitch use more upbeat music. The song that was used most often was "Wrap Your Troubles in Dreams", used both for the opening sequence and as a general theme of sorts for the character himself.

Though there were other characters, they were unnamed, such as the fat woman, the dog, the cop, and the thief. There was something of an unspoken rule that everything in the world hates Nudnik, further adding to the mayhem.

== Shorts ==
Title	Release date
Here's Nudnik	August 1, 1965
Drive On, Nudnik!	November 1965
Home Sweet Nudnik	March 1966
Nudnik on a Shoestring	March 12, 1966
Welcome, Nudnik!	May 1966
Nudnik on the Roof	July 1966
From Nudnik with Love	September 1966
Who Needs Nudnik??	May 1967
Nudnik on the Beach	May 1967
Good Neighbor Nudnik	June 1967
Nudnik's Nudnickel	August 1967
I Remember Nudnik	September 1967

== TV series ==
A "new" animated series, The Nudnik Show, was created in 1991, which showed the 12 classic shorts in syndication, and it also had one brand-new Nudnik short, "Nudnik Impossible", however it was mostly made using left over clips from old promotional material from when the shorts were original being produced in the 60s, bringing the number of Nudnik shorts from 12 to 13. It also had 11 bumpers with all-new animation, each one being about 30 seconds long; according to the IMDb listing, Jules Feiffer was a writer for the series, so it is most likely that he wrote for the bumpers. The production companies were Paramount Pictures and Rembrandt Films.

The shorts were featured on Cartoon Network's animated anthology series ToonHeads in 1996.
