= Munro (film) =

1960 Czechoslovak-American animated short film

- Directed by: Gene Deitch
- Story by: Jules Feiffer
- Produced by: William L. Snyder; Zdenka Najmanova
- Starring: Howard Morris; Seth Deitch; Marie Deitch; Jules Feiffer
- Narrated by: Howard Morris
- Edited by: Zdenka Navratilova
- Music by: Štěpán Koníček
- Production companies: Film Representations; Rembrandt Films
- Distributed by: Paramount Pictures (United States)
- Release dates: September 1960 (Czechoslovakia); September 14, 1961 (U.S.); (Note: Earliest known release date in the U.S.)
- Running time: 8 minutes 20 seconds
- Countries: Czechoslovakia; United States

Munro is a 1960 Czechoslovak-American animated short film directed by Gene Deitch, written by Jules Feiffer, and produced by William L. Snyder. Munro won an Oscar for Best Animated Short Film in 1961. It was the first short composed outside of the United States to be so honored. The Academy Film Archive preserved Munro in 2004.

== Plot ==
The title character is a rebellious little boy who is accidentally drafted into the United States Army. No matter which adult he tells, "I'm only four", they all fail to notice his age. Eventually, the harshness of army life makes Munro cry, which causes the general to realize that he really is a little boy. He is discharged and becomes a hero... and whenever he misbehaves, Munro is reminded of his stint in the army.

== Production ==
Screenwriter Feiffer, who adapted his own story from his book Passionella and Other Stories, and provided the storyboards, said the tale was a reaction to his time serving in the U.S. Army:

I came up with the story of Munro because I understood that if you're really in a rage and really want to attack someone in cartoon form, the least effective way is to jump up and down and scream and yell and to be polemical—something a lot of cartoonists have never learned. The best way is to go in the other direction and feign innocence, and bring the reader along in a quiet way. And so Munro tells this savage story but tells it entertainingly and sweetly and builds it up and gets the reader stressed, and as you read it, and particularly when you see the film, you feel your stomach knot up because of the obvious abuse and ignorance of authority. And people connected to their own situations with authority in or out of the Army when no one listens, no one believes you. They know, you don't, and they may even start to convince you, as they do Munro, that they're right and you're wrong.

Munro's voice is provided by Gene Deitch's young son Seth Deitch (later a writer and artist in his own right), while Deitch's wife Marie Deitch does the female voices.
