= Don't You Believe It! =

American radio program

Don't You Believe It! was an American radio program which aired in the late 1930s and early 1940s. The program, hosted by Alan Kent and later Tobe Reed, introduced unique facts along with debunking popular myths, followed by its tagline "Don't you believe it!" The program was sponsored by the Lorillard Tobacco Company, promoting "Sensation" cigarettes.

The droning tagline was referenced in cartoons such as the Merrie Melodies short Bacall to Arms (1946), the Tom and Jerry shorts Mouse Trouble (1944) and The Missing Mouse (1953), and the Bugs Bunny short Big Top Bunny (1951).
