= Václav Bedřich =

Václav Bedřich (28 August 1918, Příbram – 7 March 2009) was a Czech animator, actor, and film director. He is best known for his children's TV animation.

He created 358 animated films, which earned him a number of awards at domestic and international film festivals.

== Selected filmography ==
- 1944: Wedding in the Coral Sea

1953: Hrnečku, vař! ("Cook, Little Pot!")

- 1955: Devil and Káča, 44min. animation loosely based on the fairy tale "Devil and Káča" by Božena Němcová. Lucifer asks his sidekick to bring the most evil princess from the Earth. By mistake a peasant girl Káča is brought who raises hell in hell and is to be returned to the Earth as soon as possible.
- 1960: Čtyřicet dědečků (Forty Old Men; direction and scenario), 8 min. animation; a grotesque story about a magic pot which multiplies anything what is put inside
  - Honorable mention at the 9th International Short Film Festival Oberhausen (1963)
- 1961: Calypso Cat
- 1962: Mouse into Space
- 1962: The Tom and Jerry Cartoon Kit
- 1966: Pohádky ovčí babičky
- 1971: Poppy Dolly
- 1971–2014: Štaflík a Špagetka
- 1973: Víla Amálka
- 1975: Maxipes Fík
- 1978: Bob a Bobek – králíci z klobouku (Bob and Bobby – the Rabbits from a Hat)
- 1980: O zvířátkách pana Krbce
- 1981: Maxipes Fík II
- 1981: Sredni Vaštar (director); 29min., drawn animation, based on Sredni Vashtar by Hector Hugh Munro
- 1986: The Great Cheese Robbery (Czech: Velká sýrová loupež), where Bedřich was both the director and an actor. It is a 47-minute movie about three mice living in a cinema. After watching many thrillers they planned a "great cheese robbery". It is a parody of The Great Train Robbery. It is based on the children's book by Jean Van Leeuwen The Great Cheese Conspiracy first published in 1969.
- 1969-1976: Smrtící vůně A seven-part series of animated parodies on horror stories in which a young couple successfully evades traps set by an evil scientist and his sidekicks.
  - 1969: Smrtící vůně [Deadly Scent]
  - 1970:Pokažená svatba Spoiled Wedding
  - 1970:Nedokončený víkend Unfinished Weekend
  - 1971:Utopená ponorka Sunken Submarine
  - 1972:Očistná lázeň Cleansing bath
  - 1973:Poklad v pyramidě Treasure in the Pyramid
  - 1976: Uloupený obraz (Stolen Painting)

== Awards ==
In addition to the film awards, in 1960 he was awarded the Silver badge of an exemplary worker by the Ministry of Education and Culture.
