= Tom and Jerry (2023 TV series) =

Animated television series

- Also known as: Tom and Jerry Singapore
- Genre: Comedy; Slapstick
- Based on: Tom and Jerry by William Hanna; Joseph Barbera
- Story by: Vivek Bolar; Shiva Prasad Shetty; Chandrakanth Anchan
- Directed by: Vivek Bolar
- Starring: Chi Len; Kandri Shi
- Theme music composer: Advait Nemlekar
- Composer: No Sound In Space
- Countries of origin: Singapore; India; United States
- Original language: English
- No. of seasons: 1
- No. of episodes: 7

Production
- Executive producer: Sam Register
- Producers: Shreekaanth Daas; Carol Wee; Chai Yoon Fei
- Running time: 3 minutes
- Production companies: Aum Animation Studios India; Warner Bros. Animation

Original release
- Network: Cartoon Network; HBO Go
- Release: 7 August – 9 December 2023

Tom and Jerry (also known as Tom and Jerry Singapore) is an animated television series of shorts produced by Aum Animation Studios India and Warner Bros. Animation. Based on the Tom and Jerry characters and theatrical cartoons series created by William Hanna and Joseph Barbera, the show aired on Cartoon Network and HBO Go from August 7 to December 9, 2023.

The series was first announced in April 2021 and promoted in 2022, originally known as Hurry Hurry, Tom and Jerry. It was intended for Southeast Asian audiences and distribution, as it is set in various locations in Singapore, including its streets, buildings, and cityscapes, and references Singaporean culture as well. The series comprises seven three-minute episodes written by Robot Playground Media in Singapore and produced by Aum Animation Studios India in Asia in association with Warner Bros. Animation, as part of a partnership between Warner Bros. Discovery and the Singapore Tourism Board. Character designs were done by Chips and Toon Studios.
