= Tom & Jerry (2021 soundtrack) =

Tom & Jerry (Original Motion Picture Soundtrack)

Film score by Christopher Lennertz
- Released: February 12, 2021
- Recorded: 2020
- Studio: Abbey Road Studios, London
- Genre: Film score
- Length: 56:16
- Label: WaterTower
- Producer: Christopher Lennertz

Christopher Lennertz chronology
Shaft (2019)	Tom & Jerry (2021)	Barb and Star Go to Vista Del Mar (2021)

Tom & Jerry (Original Motion Picture Soundtrack) is the score album composed by Christopher Lennertz for the 2021 film Tom & Jerry, directed by Tim Story. Based on the titular cartoon characters of the same name created by William Hanna and Joseph Barbera, produced by Warner Animation Group and Warner Bros. Pictures. The film's soundtrack was released by WaterTower Music on February 12, 2021.

== Background ==
Story's recurring collaborator Christopher Lennertz was announced as the film's composer in July 2020. For the film's music, Lennertz and the crew also looked back to the music of the original cartoons as inspiration, which even includes creating an exclusive theme tune for Tom and Jerry that plays during the film's end credits. They decided to use the orchestral music, as what they did in the original. Initially, they planned to use jazz music for the themes but connect with audiences from each demographic and recall the nostalgic value, Lennertz decided to blend each genre, such as the hip hop and the Indian music so as to be " inclusive of as many cultures as possible". Later, he recorded a 100-piece orchestra to provide a "big action sound" and recall the nostalgia of the original cartoon, and explained it as a "fun time working on the score". Tim Story, on the film's music, added that "whether it was hip hop in the beginning or the Indian in the music in the wedding, we just wanted to always kind of find music that was true to what was happening on screen."

Lennertz's score was released into a 30-track album by WaterTower Music on February 12, 2021, two weeks before the film's United States release. More music inspiration from the original cartoons involves the film's portrayal of Tom as a jazz pianist, such as Tom playing jazz pianist Eric Reed's piece "Soft Shoe", when busking in Central Park. The Japanese dub provides a new theme song for the movie titled "Piece of Cake" by Eito.

== Reception ==
Jonathan Broxton of Movie Muaic UK wrote "There is a lot to like here. So much of the album is really fun. Lennertz is an excellent composer, and he and his orchestrators did a great job incorporating so many different musical styles and instruments. The problem is that we rarely get to enjoy one sound for longer than half a minute. The score has some good highlights, but they're all 30 seconds long. Your enjoyment of this music away from the film will depend very much on your tolerance for having the listening experience cut up into all these small bites." Filmtracks.com wrote "Tom & Jerry is endearing and exhausting at the same time. There's only so much of the record scratching sound effect that one can tolerate in this context. Expect most film music collectors sympathetic to the Mancini approach to refuse the patience necessary for its tone. But there are some really smart comedy moments in the work, the latter half of "Better Cheese Trap" among the snazziest pieces of parody music in years. There's much to like about Lennertz's talents here, but this score was destined for trouble the moment the director decided to infuse the soundtrack with black culture despite almost all the human, feline, and vermin characters in the story being, well, not black."

== Track listing ==
No.	Title	Length
1.	"Tom and Jerry"	0:51
2.	"Park Chase"	1:18
3.	"Kayla Quits"	1:00
4.	"Tom and Jerry Arrive"	1:21
5.	"Jerry's Theme - Meeting Linda"	1:55
6.	"Tom in Disguise"	1:42
7.	"Kayla's Tour"	2:44
8.	"Preeta & Ben"	2:19
9.	"Rodentia Is Toast"	1:14
10.	"Cheese Trap"	1:44
11.	"Tightrope"	1:42
12.	"I Know You"	1:50
13.	"Could He Wear a Hat"	2:03
14.	"Meet My Enforcer"	1:18
15.	"Jerry's Spa"	1:48
16.	"Spike Drags Terrence"	1:01
17.	"Better Cheese Trap"	1:52
18.	"Rooftop Chat"	1:40
19.	"Petnado"	2:27
20.	"Terrence Fired"	2:49
21.	"Terrence Watches"	1:18
22.	"Bridal Chat - Drone"	2:24
23.	"Locked Up"	2:00
24.	"Interrogation"	1:50
25.	"Wedding Disaster"	6:08
26.	"The Wedding's Off"	2:02
27.	"New Plan"	1:15
28.	"Married in the Park"	2:31
29.	"Cat Dog Mouse Fight"	0:31
30.	"End Credits (Tom and Jerry)"	1:25
Total length:		56:02

== Charts ==
Chart (2021)	Position
UK Soundtrack Albums (OCC)	45
US Soundtrack Albums (Billboard)	23
