= Zdeňka Deitchová =

Czech film animator and director (born 1928)

- Born: Zdeňka Pavlina Hrachovcová; May 18, 1928; Prague, Czechoslovakia
- Died: November 1, 2025 (aged 97); Prague, Czech Republic
- Education: School of Applied Arts
- Known for: Animation
- Spouse: Gene Deitch (m. 1964; died 2020)

Zdeňka Pavlina Deitchová (née Hrachovcová, formerly Najnamová, May 18 1928 - Nov 1 2025) was a Czech animator and production manager, and the director for the Bratři v triku studio. Deitchová worked on a variety of projects like Krtek and other films. She was married to American animator Gene Deitch until his death in 2020.

== Early life ==
Zdeňka Najmanová was born on May 18, 1928, in Prague, Czechoslovakia. Her father worked for Czechoslovak Railways. In 1935 after her mother died suddenly, she was raised by her father, František Hrachovec, and her older brother, František Hrachovec. In Prague, she attended and graduated from the School of Applied Arts.

== Career ==
Deitchová got a job as an animator at the Bratři v triku studio. Eventually, she was promoted to production manager and was put in charge of the studio's international contract work. In this job, she met William Snyder and worked on a variety of his films. Through her work with William Snyder, she met Gene Deitch, who she later married. She then became the director of the studio and worked on a variety of projects like Krtek with Gaia Vitkova as the editor. Deitchová also taught at the Animation Department of the Film and TV School of the Academy of Performing Arts in Prague (FAMU).

Deitchová died in November 2025, aged 97.

== Legacy ==
In 2007 after working in the industry for over 55 years, she retired. In 2014, Deitchová was interviewed by the nonprofit Post Bellum as part of their Stories of the 20th Century project.

== Filmography ==
Year	Title	Role	Notes
2002-2007	Čarodějné pohádky	Production manager	Television series
2005	Mach a Šebestová na cestách	Production manager	Television series
2003	O Kanafáskovi	Production manager	Television series
1993-2003	Edudant and Francimor	Production manager	Television series
1987-2002	Krtek	Production manager	Television Series
1991	Sedem vymyslených budíkov	Production manager	Television series
1988-1990	Štaflík a Špagetka	Production manager	Television Series
1990	The Emperor's New Clothes	Production manager	Short Film
1990	The Pigs' Wedding	Production manager	Short Film
1987	In the Night Kitchen	Production manager	Short Film
1986	The Great Cheese Robbery	Production manager	Movie
1985	Mr. Pip's Kisses	Production manager	Short Film
1984	Why Mosquitoes Buzz in People's Ears	Production manager	Short Film
1983	Burt Dow: Deep-Water Man	Production manager	Short Film
1983	Procházka pana Pipa	Production manager	Short Film
1983-1987	Rákosníček a jeho rybník	Production manager	Television series
1982	The Hat	Production manager	Short Film
1981	Moon Man	Production manager	Short Film
1980	Teeny-Tiny and the Witch Woman	Production manager	Short Film
1979	Smile for Auntie	Production manager	Short Film
1977	Charlie Needs a Cloak	Production manager	Short Film
1977	Strega Nona	Production manager	Short Film
1975	Na věčnou památku	Production manager	Short Film
1971	The Foolish Frog	Production manager	Short Film
1969	The Giants	Production manager	Short Film
1962	Mouse Into Space	Production manager – uncredited	Short Film
1962	Carmen Get It!	Production manager – uncredited	Short Film
1962	Buddies... Thicker Than Water	Production manager – uncredited	Short Film
1962	Sorry Safari	Production manager – uncredited	Short Film
1962	Anatole	Production manager – as S. Nauman	Short Film
1962	Tall in the Trap	Production manager – uncredited	Short Film
1962	The Tom and Jerry Cartoon Kit	Production manager – uncredited	Short Film
1962	Dicky Moe	Production manager – uncredited	Short Film
1962	Calypso Cat	Production manager – uncredited	Short Film
1962	Landing Stripling	Production manager – uncredited	Short Film
1962	High Steaks	Production manager – uncredited	Short Film
1961	It's Greek to Me-ow!	Production manager – uncredited	Short Film
1961	Down and Outing	Production manager – uncredited	Short Film
1961	Munro	Production manager – uncredited	Short Film
1961	Switchin' Kitten	Production manager – uncredited	Short Film
1960	Sunshine	Production manager – as S. Nauman	Short Film
