= Devil and Káča =

Czech literary fairy tale by Božena Němcová

Devil and Káča (Czech: Čert a Káča) is a literary fairy tale by Czech writer Božena Němcová from her collection Národní báchorky a pověsti (Folk Stories and Legends). It was adapted from a Czech folk tale.

== Plot ==
A devil dances with a village old maid Káča, takes her to the hell, and then cannot get rid of her. A young shepherd helps him out and the devil promised the shepherd a reward. Eventually the shepherd tricks the devil into a larger reward by scaring him by telling that Káča is coming.

== Adaptations ==
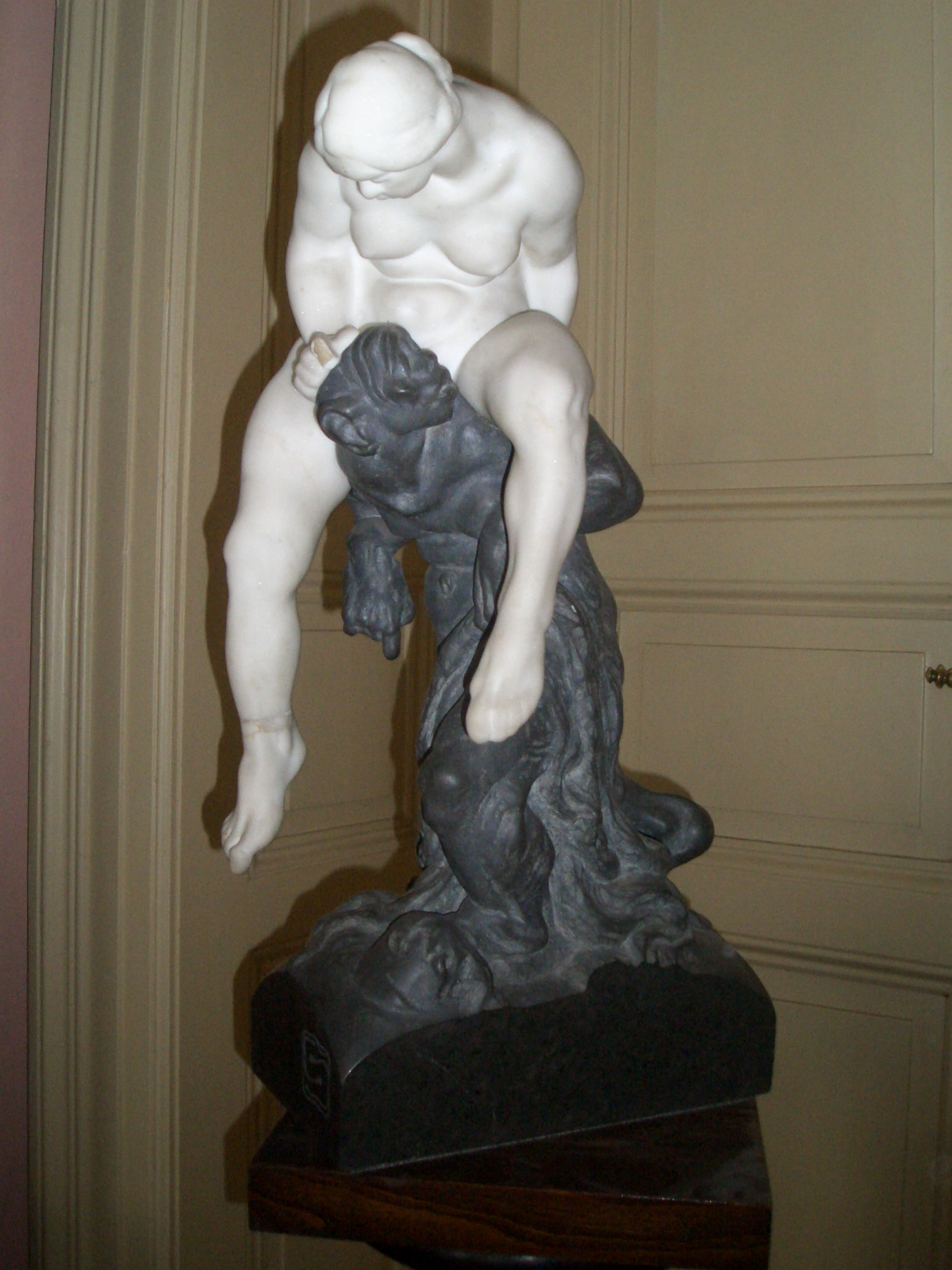
A vision of Devil and Káča by Ladislav Šaloun

- 1899: opera by Antonín Dvořák, The Devil and Kate
- 1955: Devil and Káča, 44min. animation directed by Václav Bedřich loosely based on the fairy tale by Božena Němcová. Lucifer asks his sidekick to bring the most evil princess from the Earth. By mistake a peasant girl Káča was brought and she raised a hell in hell and she is to be returned to the Earth as soon as possible.
- 1970: Devil and Káča, Czech black and white comedy TV film with Jiřina Bohdalová as Káča, Ladislav Trojan as devil and Jiří Krampol as shepherd.
