= The Last Trick =

- Directed by: Jan Švankmajer
- Starring: Eva Svankmajerova; Jiri Prochazka
- Cinematography: Svatopluk Maly
- Edited by: Milada Sadkova
- Music by: Dr. Steven Konichek
- Distributed by: Ustredni Pujcovna Filmu
- Release date: 1964
- Running time: 12 minutes
- Country: Czechoslovakia
- Language: Czech

The Last Trick (Czech: Poslední trik pana Schwarcewalldea a pana Edgara) is a 1964 Czechoslovak animated short film by Jan Švankmajer. It was Švankmajer's first film.

== Plot ==
During the title sequence, the cast and crew are seen backstage preparing for their performance. The play depicts two mime-like magicians (who are portrayed by both costumed actors and Kuroko style puppets) named Mr. Edgar and Mr. Schwarzwald, trying to outdo each other by performing various stage tricks for the pleasure of an unseen audience. After each act, the two performers congratulate each other with a handshake. However, as tensions rise, the handshakes become less friendly and even violent. For his first trick, Edgar skins a fish by placing it inside his papier mache head; Schwarzwald one ups him by making a dog puppet perform various tricks on a tightrope; Edgar in turn grows several arms and begins playing various instruments simultaneously; Schwarzwald imitates this trick by growing several heads and juggling them; and Edgar causes several chairs to come alive and perform tricks at the crack of a whip. For the magicians' last trick, Edgar and Schwarzwald make themselves disappear by tearing each other to pieces.
