= KAC =

KAC or Kac may refer to:

== Organizations ==
- Kenitra Athletic Club, a football club in Kenitra, Morocco
- EC KAC or Klagenfurter Athletiksport Club, an ice hockey club in Klagenfurt, Austria
- Knight's Armament Company, an American firearm manufacturer
- Korea Airports Corporation
- Kosciusko Alpine Club, an Australian ski club

== People ==
- Eduardo Kac (born 1960), Brazilian-American artist
- Mac Kac (1920–1987), French jazz drummer
- Mark Kac (1914–1984), Polish-American mathematician
- Victor Kac (born 1943), Russian-American mathematician

== Places ==
- Kać, Novi Sad, South Bačka District, Serbia
- Kenyon Athletic Center, Gambier, Knox County, Ohio, US
- Kiaracondong railway station, Bandung, West Java, Indonesia, code

== Other ==
- ICAO designator for Kuwait Airways
- Jinghpaw language (ISO 639-3 code)

== See also ==
- Kács, Borsod-Abaúj-Zemplén, Hungary
- KACS, a radio station in Washington state, US
- Kach (disambiguation)
