= Štěpán Koníček =

Czech conductor and composer

- Born: 7 March 1928; Prague, Czechoslovakia
- Died: 26 May 2006 (aged 78); Prague, Czech Republic
- Occupation: Composer
- Years active: 1951–1997

Štěpán Koníček (7 March 1928 – 26 May 2006) was a Czech composer and conductor. He is known for his long-term collaboration with the Film Symphony Orchestra (FISYO) and for recording film music.

== Life ==
Koníček was born in Prague. He studied conducting under Karel Ančerl and composing as a pupil of Pavel Bořkovec, both at the Academy of Performing Arts in Prague. During his career, he collaborated with film directors such as Roman Polanski, David Lynch and Jane Campion. He created music for the film Munro, which won the Academy Award for Animated Short Film in 1961. He also wrote the music of the Jan Svankmajer first short film The Last Trick.

Some of Koníček's compositions incorporate elements of Brazilian music such as bossa nova and samba. He contributed the musical score for Gene Deitch's 1961–62 Tom and Jerry cartoons, in which his name credits were anglicized as Steven Konichek to prevent association with Communism.
