= William L. Snyder =

American film producer (1918–1998)

- Born: William Lawrence Snyder; February 14, 1918; Baltimore, Maryland, U.S.
- Died: June 3, 1998 (aged 80); Livingston, New York, U.S.
- Occupation: Animation producer
- Known for: The founder of Rembrandt Films
- Spouse: Peggy Leibowitz Snyder
- Children: 3

William Lawrence Snyder (February 14, 1918 – June 3, 1998) was an American film producer. Snyder founded the company Rembrandt Films with offices in Czechoslovakia as a distributor of European films in the United States.

In 1960 he began a collaboration with animator Gene Deitch beginning with the film Munro, which told the story of a four-year-old boy drafted into the army, and won the Academy Award for Animated Short Film.

The two continued their collaboration, with Snyder producing and Deitch directing both original films, including the Nudnik series, and cartoons outsourced from American studios such as Tom and Jerry cartoons for MGM, episodes of Popeye the Sailor for King Features, and shorts for both UPA and Terrytoons, both of where Deitch had previously worked. Three additional nominations for Best Animated Sort were received. Snyder also produced the feature film Alice of Wonderland in Paris (1966).

Snyder and Rembrandt Films had the film rights to Tolkien's work from 1964 to 1967 and intended to make a feature-length animated film of The Hobbit, working with Deitch as an animator and Bill Bernal as a writer. Snyder asked Deitch to make a 12-minute version, quickly and cheaply, purely to fulfil the wording of the contract. As such, this version — which was never intended for public exhibition — has been considered an "ashcan copy".

Snyder died of Alzheimer's disease at the age of 80 in 1998.

Rembrandt Films is run today by his son, Adam Snyder, and his wife, Patricia Giniger Snyder.
