= Tom and Jerry =

American cartoon series and franchise

- Logo used since 1985
- Created by: William Hanna; Joseph Barbera
- Original work: Puss Gets the Boot (1940)
- Owners: Turner Entertainment Co. (Skydance)
- Years: 1940–present

Print publications
- Comics: List of comics
- Comic strips: List of comic strips

Films and television
- Films: Tom and Jerry: The Movie (1992); Tom and Jerry (2021); Tom and Jerry: Forbidden Compass (2025)
- Short films: List of shorts (1940–1967, 2001–present); Spike and Tyke (1957)
- Animated series: List of animated series
- Television special: Tom and Jerry: Santa's Little Helpers (2014)
- Television short: The Mansion Cat (2001)
- Direct-to-video: List of direct-to-video films

Theatrical presentations
- Musical: Tom and Jerry: Purr-Chance to Dream (2019)

Games
- Video games: List of video games

Audio
- Soundtracks: Tom and Jerry & Tex Avery Too!; Tom & Jerry (2021)

Tom and Jerry (also known as Tom & Jerry) is an American animated media franchise and series of comedy short films created in 1940 by William Hanna and Joseph Barbera. Best known for its 161 theatrical short films produced and released by Metro-Goldwyn-Mayer, the series centers on the rivalry between a cat named Tom and a mouse named Jerry. Many shorts also feature several recurring characters.

Created in 1940 as the MGM cartoon department struggled to compete with Walt Disney Productions and Leon Schlesinger Productions (Warner Bros.' Looney Tunes and Merrie Melodies), Tom and Jerry's initial short-film titled Puss Gets the Boot proved successful in theaters and garnered an Academy Award nomination for Best Short Subject (Cartoon). Hanna and Barbera later directed a total of 114 Tom and Jerry shorts for its initial MGM run from 1940 to 1958. During this time, they won seven Academy Awards for Best Animated Short Film, tying for first place with Walt Disney's Silly Symphonies with the most awards in the category. After the MGM cartoon studio closed in 1957, MGM revived the series with Gene Deitch directing an additional thirteen Tom and Jerry shorts for Rembrandt Films in Czechoslovakia, from 1961 to 1962. Tom and Jerry became the highest-grossing animated short-film series of that time, overtaking Looney Tunes. Chuck Jones produced another 34 shorts with Sib Tower 12 Productions between 1963 and 1967. Five more shorts have been produced since 2001, making a total of 166 shorts.

A number of spin-offs have been made, including the television series The Tom and Jerry Show (1975), The Tom and Jerry Comedy Show (1980–1982), Tom & Jerry Kids (1990–1993), Tom and Jerry Tales (2006–2008), and The Tom and Jerry Show (2014–2021). In 1992, the first feature-length film based on the series, Tom and Jerry: The Movie, was released. Thirteen direct-to-video films have been produced since 2002. In 2019, a musical adaptation of the series, titled Tom and Jerry: Purr-Chance to Dream, debuted in Japan, in advance of Tom and Jerry's 80th anniversary. In 2021, the live-action/animated hybrid film Tom and Jerry was released, while a Chinese-American computer-animated film, Tom and Jerry: Forbidden Compass, premiered in June 2025.

== Plot ==
The series features comic fights between an iconic set of adversaries, a house cat (Tom) and a house mouse (Jerry). The plots of many shorts are often set in the backdrop of a house, centering on Tom (who is often enlisted by a human) trying to capture Jerry, and the mayhem and destruction that follows. Tom rarely succeeds in catching Jerry, mainly because of Jerry's cleverness, cunning abilities, and luck. However, on several occasions, they have displayed genuine friendship and concern for each other's well-being. At other times, the pair set aside their rivalry in order to pursue a common goal, such as when a baby escapes the watch of a negligent babysitter, causing Tom and Jerry to pursue the baby and keep it away from danger, in the shorts Busy Buddies and Tot Watchers respectively. Despite their endless attacks on one another, they have saved each other's lives every time they were truly in danger, with the exception of The Two Mouseketeers and Blue Cat Blues.

The cartoons are known for their violent gags. While Tom and Jerry has often been criticized as excessively violent, there is no blood or gore in any scene. Tom uses axes, hammers, firearms, firecrackers, explosives, traps and poison to kill Jerry, and Jerry's methods of retaliation are far more violent, with frequent success, including slicing Tom in half, decapitating him, shutting his head or fingers in a window or a door, stuffing Tom's tail in a waffle iron or a mangle, kicking him into a refrigerator, getting him electrocuted, pounding him with a mace, club or mallet, letting a tree or electric pole drive him into the ground, sticking matches into his feet and lighting them, etc.

Music plays a very important part in the shorts, emphasizing the action, bringing in humor, filling in for traditional sound effects, and lending emotion to the scenes. Musical director Scott Bradley created complex scores that combined elements of jazz, classical, and pop music. Bradley often used contemporary pop songs and songs from other films, including MGM films such as The Wizard of Oz and Meet Me in St. Louis.

The two lead characters speak English on rare occasions. Most of the vocal effects used for Tom and Jerry are their high-pitched laughs and gasping screams. Even though Tom and Jerry almost never speak, the shorts often show other characters speaking. For example, the character Mammy Two Shoes has lines in nearly every cartoon in which she appears.

== Characters ==
=== Tom and Jerry ===
Tom, named "Jasper" in his debut appearance, is a gray and white domestic shorthair cat. "Tom" is a generic name for a male cat. He is usually but not always portrayed as living a comfortable, or even pampered life, while Jerry, whose name is not explicitly mentioned in his debut appearance, is a small, brown house mouse who always lives in close proximity to Tom. Despite being very energetic, determined and much larger, Tom is no match for Jerry's wits. Jerry possesses surprising strength for his size, approximately the equivalent of Tom's, lifting items such as anvils with relative ease and withstanding considerable impacts.

Although cats typically chase mice to eat them, it is quite rare for Tom to actually try to eat Jerry. He tries to hurt or compete with him just to taunt Jerry, even as revenge, or to obtain a reward from a human, including his owner(s)/master(s), for catching Jerry, or for generally doing his job well as a house cat. By the final "fade-out" of each cartoon, Jerry usually gets the best of Tom.

Other results may be reached. On rare occasions, Tom triumphs, usually when Jerry becomes the aggressor or he pushes Tom a little too far. In The Million Dollar Cat, Jerry learns that Tom will lose his newly acquired wealth if he harms any animal, especially mice. He then torments Tom a little too much until he retaliates. In Timid Tabby, Tom's look-alike cousin pushes Jerry over the edge. Occasionally and usually ironically, they both lose, usually because Jerry's last trap or attack on Tom backfires on him or he overlooks something. In Chuck Jones' Filet Meow, Jerry orders a shark from the pet store to scare Tom away from eating a goldfish. Afterward, the shark scares Jerry away as well. They occasionally end up being friends, although there is often a last-minute event that ruins the truce. One cartoon that has a friendly ending is Snowbody Loves Me.

Both characters display sadistic tendencies, in that they are equally likely to take pleasure in tormenting each other, although it is often in response to a triggering event. However, when one character appears to truly be in mortal danger from an unplanned situation or due to actions by a third party, the other will develop a conscience and save him. Occasionally, they bond over a mutual sentiment towards an unpleasant experience and their attacking each other is more play than serious attacks. Multiple shorts show the two getting along with minimal difficulty, and they are more than capable of working together when the situation calls for it, usually against a third party who manages to torture and humiliate them both.

Sometimes this partnership is forgotten quickly when an unexpected event happens, or when one character feels that the other is no longer necessary. This is the case in Posse Cat, when they agree that Jerry will allow himself to be caught if Tom agrees to share his reward dinner, but Tom then reneges. Other times, Tom keeps his promise to Jerry and the partnerships are not quickly dissolved after the problem is solved.

Tom changes his love interest many times. The first love interest is Toots who appears in Puss n' Toots, and calls him "Tommy" in The Mouse Comes to Dinner. He is interested in a cat called Toots in The Zoot Cat although she has a different appearance to the original Toots. The most frequent love interest of Tom's is Toodles Galore, who never has any dialogue in the cartoons.

Despite five shorts ending with a depiction of Tom's apparent death, his demise is never permanent. He even reads about his own death in a flashback in Jerry's Diary. He appears to die in explosions in Mouse Trouble, after which he is seen in heaven, Yankee Doodle Mouse and in Safety Second, while in The Two Mouseketeers he is guillotined offscreen. The short Blue Cat Blues ends with both Tom and Jerry sitting on the railroad tracks with the intent of suicide while the whistle of an oncoming train is heard foreshadowing their imminent death.

==== Tom and Jerry speaking ====
Although many supporting and minor characters speak, Tom and Jerry rarely do so themselves. One exception is The Lonesome Mouse where they speak several times briefly, primarily Jerry, to contrive to get Tom back into the house. Tom more often sings while wooing female cats. For example, Tom sings Louis Jordan's "Is You Is or Is You Ain't My Baby" in the 1946 short Solid Serenade. In that short and Zoot Cat, Tom woos female cats using a deep, heavily French-accented voice in imitation of a then-popular leading man, actor Charles Boyer.

At the end of The Million Dollar Cat, after beginning to antagonize Jerry he says, "Gee, I'm throwin' away a million dollars... BUT I'M HAPPY!". In The Mouse Comes to Dinner, Tom speaks to his girlfriend Toots while inadvertently sitting on a stove: "Say, what's cookin'?", to which Toots replies "You are, stupid." In Tom and Jerry: The Magic Ring, Jerry says, "No, no, no, no, no" when choosing the shop to remove his ring.

Another instance of speech comes in Solid Serenade and The Framed Cat, where Tom directs Spike through a few dog tricks in a dog-trainer manner. In Puss Gets the Boot, Jerry begs and prays for his life when Tom catches him by the tail. Jerry has whispered in Tom's ear on several occasions. In Love Me, Love My Mouse, Jerry calls Toots "Mama".

Tom's scream
The most notable variant of Tom's scream, described as "leather-lunged" and recorded by William Hanna with the sound effect's beginning and ending trimmed out.

Co-director William Hanna provided most of the vocal effects for the pair, including Tom's leather-lunged scream, created by recording Hanna's scream and eliminating the beginning and ending of the recording, leaving only the strongest part of the scream on the soundtrack, and Jerry's nervous gulp.

The only other reasonably common vocalization is made by Tom when some external reference claims a certain scenario or eventuality to be impossible, which inevitably thwarts Tom's plans – at which point, a bedraggled and battered Tom appears and says in a haunting, echoing voice "Don't you believe it!", a reference to the then-popular 1940s radio show Don't You Believe It!. In Mouse Trouble, Tom says "Don't you believe it!" after being beaten up by Jerry, which also happens in The Missing Mouse. In the 1946 short Trap Happy, Tom hires a cat disguised as a mouse exterminator who, after several failed attempts to dispatch Jerry and suffering a lot of accidents in the process, changes profession to Cat exterminator by crossing out the "Mouse" on his title and writing "CAT", resulting in Tom spelling out the word out loud before reluctantly pointing at himself.

One short, 1956's Blue Cat Blues, is narrated by Jerry in voiceover, voiced by Paul Frees, as they try to win back their ladyfriends. Jerry was voiced by Sara Berner during his appearance in the 1945 MGM musical Anchors Aweigh. Tom and Jerry: The Movie is the first, and so far only installment of the series where the famous cat-and-mouse duo regularly speaks or is able to be understood by humans. In that film, Tom was voiced by Richard Kind, and Jerry was voiced by Dana Hill.

=== Spike and Tyke ===
In his attempts to catch Jerry, Tom often has to deal with Spike, known as "Killer" and "Butch" in some shorts, an angry, vicious but gullible bulldog who tries to attack Tom for bothering him or his son Tyke while trying to get Jerry. Originally, Spike was unnamed and mute, aside from howls and biting noises as well as attacking indiscriminately, not caring whether it was Tom or Jerry though usually attacking Tom. In later cartoons, Spike spoke often, using a voice and expressions, performed by Billy Bletcher and later Patrick McGeehan, Jerry Mann, Bob Shamrock, John Brown, Stan Freberg and Daws Butler, modeled after comedian Jimmy Durante. Spike's coat has altered throughout the years between gray and creamy tan. The addition of Spike's son Tyke in the late 1940s led to both a slight softening of Spike's character and a short-lived spin-off theatrical series called Spike and Tyke.

Most cartoons with Spike in them conform to a theme: usually, Spike is trying to accomplish something, such as building a dog house or sleeping, when Tom and Jerry's antics stop him doing it. Spike then presumably due to prejudice, singles out Tom as the culprit, and threatens him that if it ever happens again, he will do "something horrible" to him, effectively forcing Tom to take the blame, while Jerry overhears. Afterward, Jerry usually does anything he can to interrupt whatever Spike is doing, while Tom barely manages to stop him, usually getting injured in the process. Usually, Jerry eventually wrecks whatever Spike is doing in spectacular fashion, and leaves Tom to take the blame, forcing him to flee from Spike and inevitably lose.

Off-screen, Spike does something to Tom, and Tom is generally shown injured or in a bad situation while Jerry smugly cuddles up to Spike unscathed. Tom sometimes gets irritated with Spike. An example is in That's My Pup!, when Spike forces Tom to run up a tree every time his son barkes, causing Tom to hang Tyke on a flag pole. At least once, Tom does something that benefits Spike, who promises not to interfere ever again, causing Jerry to frantically leave the house and run into the distance, in Hic-cup Pup. Spike is well known for his famous "Listen pussycat!" catchphrase when he threatens Tom, his other famous catchphrase is "That's my boy!" normally said when he supports or congratulates his son.

Tyke is described as a cute, sweet-looking, happy and lovable puppy. He is Spike's son. Unlike Spike, Tyke does not speak and only communicates, mostly towards his father, by barking, yapping, wagging his tail, whimpering and growling. Spike would always go out of his way to care and comfort his son and make sure that he is safe from Tom. Tyke loves his father and Spike loves his son and they get along like friends, although most of the time they would be taking a nap or Spike would teach Tyke the main facts of life of being a dog. Like Spike, Tyke's appearance has altered throughout the years, from gray, with white paws, to creamy tan. When Tom & Jerry Kids first aired, this was the first time that viewers heard Tyke speak.

=== Butch and Toodles Galore ===
Butch is a black, cigar-smoking alley cat who also wants to eat Jerry. He is Tom's most frequent adversary. For most of the shorts he appears in, he is usually seen rivaling Tom over Toodles. Butch was Tom's chum as in some cartoons, where Butch is leader of Tom's alley cat buddies, who are mostly Lightning, Topsy, and Meathead. Butch talks more often than Tom or Jerry in most shorts.

Butch and Toodles were originally introduced in Hugh Harman's 1941 short The Alley Cat, but were integrated into Tom and Jerry rather than continuing in their own series.

=== Nibbles ===
Nibbles is a small gray mouse who often appears in shorts as an orphan mouse. He is a carefree individual who very rarely understands the danger of the situation, simply following instructions the best he can both to Jerry's command and his own innocent understanding of the situation. This can lead to such results as "getting the cheese" by simply asking Tom to pick it up for him, rather than following Jerry's example of outmaneuvering and sneaking around Tom. Many times Nibbles is an ally of Jerry in fights against Tom, including being the second Mouseketeer. He is given speaking roles in all his appearances as a Mouseketeer, often with a high-pitched French tone, provided by Francoise Brun-Cottan. However, during a short in which he rescued Robin Hood, his voice was instead a more masculine, gruff Cockney accent, provided by Lucille Bliss.

=== The Housekeeper ===
The housekeeper, usually seen from the torso down, is a heavy-set, middle-aged black woman who often has to deal with the mayhem generated by the lead characters. Voiced by character actress Lillian Randolph, she is often seen as the owner of Tom, and perhaps the homeowner as well. Her face was only shown once, very briefly, in Saturday Evening Puss. Her appearances have often been edited out, dubbed, or re-animated as a slim white woman in later television showings, since her character is a mammy archetype that had been protested as racist by the NAACP and other civil rights groups since the 1940s. In a 1975 article in Film Comment she was referred to as "Mammy Two Shoes", a moniker that has been inaccurately attributed to the character ever since, The name "Mammy Two-Shoes" was on the Disney model sheets for a character in a Silly Symphony cartoon, though the name was never spoken in the cartoon. A similar housekeeper then appeared in MGM Bosko cartoons by Harman and Ising, also without a name. At no time, ever, was the name used in any Tom and Jerry cartoon, The author of the 1975 article later apologized, but too much time had established the incorrect information, including on the DVD releases of the cartoons, in which the script read by Whoopi Goldberg on the Tom and Jerry Spotlight Collection: Vol. 2 DVD set, while explaining the importance of African-American representation in the cartoon series, however stereotyped, mentions the incorrect name numerous times.

== History ==
Tom and Jerry titlecard from 1947 to 1953

"Tom and Jerry" was a commonplace phrase for young men given to drinking, gambling, and riotous living in 19th-century London, England. The term comes from Life in London; or, The Day and Night Scenes of Jerry Hawthorn, Esq., and his elegant friend, Corinthian Tom (1821) by Pierce Egan, the British sports journalist who authored similar accounts compiled as Boxiana. However Brewer notes no more than an "unconscious" echo of the Regency era, and thus Georgian era, origins in the naming of the cartoon.

=== Hanna-Barbera era (1940–1958) ===
In August 1937, animator and storyman Joseph Barbera began to work at MGM, then the largest studio in Hollywood. He learned that co-owner Louis B. Mayer wished to boost the animation department by encouraging the artists to develop some new cartoon characters, following the lack of success with its earlier cartoon series based on the Captain and the Kids comic strip. Barbera then teamed with fellow Harman-Ising unit animator and director William Hanna, who joined Harman-Ising Productions in 1930, and pitched new ideas, among them was the concept of two "equal characters who were always in conflict with each other". An early thought involved a fox and a dog before they settled on a cat and mouse. The pair discussed their ideas with producer Fred Quimby, then the head of the short film department who, despite a lack of interest in it, gave them the green-light to produce one cartoon short.

The first short, Puss Gets the Boot, features a cat named Jasper and an unnamed mouse, named Jinx in pre-production, and an African American housemaid named Mammy Two Shoes. Leonard Maltin described it as "very new and special [...] that was to change the course of MGM cartoon production" and established the successful Tom and Jerry formula of comical cat and mouse chases with slapstick gags. It was released onto the theatre circuit on February 10, 1940. The pair, having been advised by management not to produce any more, focused on other cartoons including Gallopin' Gals (1940) and Officer Pooch (1941). Matters changed when Texas businesswoman Bessa Short sent a letter to MGM, asking whether more cat and mouse shorts would be produced, which helped convince management to commission a series.

A studio contest held to rename both characters was won by animator Jack Carr, who suggested Tom the cat and Jerry the mouse. Carr was awarded a first-place prize of $50, equivalent to $1,149 in 2025. It has been suggested, but not proven, that the names were derived from a 1932 story by Damon Runyon, who took them from the name of a popular Christmastime cocktail, itself derived from the names of two characters in an 1821 stage play by William Moncrieff, an adaptation of 1821 Egan's book titled Life in London where the names originated, which was based on George Cruikshank's, Isaac Robert Cruikshank's, and Egan's own careers. Puss Gets the Boot was a critical success, earning an Academy Award nomination for Best Short Subject: Cartoons in 1941 despite the credits listing Ising and omitting Hanna and Barbera.

After MGM gave the green-light for Hanna and Barbera to continue, the studio entered production on the second Tom and Jerry cartoon, The Midnight Snack (1941). The pair continued to work on the series for the next fifteen years of their career. The composer of the series, Scott Bradley, made it difficult for the musicians to perform his score which often involved the twelve-tone technique developed by Arnold Schoenberg. The series developed a quicker, more energetic and violent tone which was inspired by the work of MGM colleague Tex Avery. Hanna and Barbera made minor adjustments to Tom and Jerry's appearance so they would "age gracefully". Jerry lost weight and his long eyelashes, while Tom lost his jagged fur for a smoother appearance, had larger eyebrows, and received a white and gray face with a white mouth. He adopted a quadrupedal stance at first, like a real cat, to become increasingly and almost exclusively bipedal.

Hanna and Barbera produced 114 cartoons for MGM, thirteen of which were nominated for an Academy Award for Best Short Subject. Seven went on to win, breaking the winning streak held by Walt Disney's studio in the category. Tom and Jerry won more Academy Awards than any other character-based theatrical animated series. Barbera estimated the typical budget of $50,000 for each Tom and Jerry cartoon which made the duo take "time to get it right". A typical cartoon took around six weeks to make.

As per standard practice for American animation production at the time, Barbera and Hanna did not work with a script beforehand. After coming up with a cartoon idea together, Barbera would flesh out the story by drawing a storyboard and provide character designs and animation layouts. Hanna did the animation timing - planning the music and temporal beats and accents the animation action would occur on - and assigned the animators their scenes and supervised their work. Hanna provided incidental voice work, in particular Tom's numerous screams of pain. Despite minimal creative input, as head of the MGM cartoon studio, Quimby was credited as the producer of all cartoons until 1955.

The rise in television in the 1950s caused problems for the MGM animation studio, leading to budget cuts on Tom and Jerry cartoons due to decreased revenue from theatrical screenings. In an attempt to combat this, MGM ordered that all subsequent shorts be produced in the widescreen CinemaScope format. The first, Pet Peeve, was released in November 1954. The studio found that re-releases of older cartoons were earning as much as new ones, resulting in the executive decision to cease production on Tom and Jerry and later the animation studio on May 15, 1957. The final cartoon produced by Hanna and Barbera, Tot Watchers, was released on June 25, 1958. The pair decided to leave and went on to focus on their own production company Hanna-Barbera Productions, which went on to produce such popular animated television series including The Flintstones, Yogi Bear, The Jetsons and Scooby-Doo.

==== Production formats ====
Before 1954, all Tom and Jerry cartoons were produced in the standard Academy ratio and format. In 1954 and 1955, some of the output was dually produced in dual versions: one Academy-ratio negative composed for a flat widescreen (1.75:1) format and one shot in the CinemaScope process. From 1955 until the closure of the MGM cartoon studio a year later, all Tom and Jerry cartoons were produced in CinemaScope. Some even had their soundtracks recorded in Perspecta directional audio. All of the Hanna and Barbera cartoons were shot as successive color exposure negatives in Technicolor.

=== Gene Deitch era (1961–1962) ===
In 1961, MGM revived the Tom and Jerry franchise, and contracted European animation studio Rembrandt Films to produce 13 Tom and Jerry shorts in Prague, Czechoslovakia. All were directed by Gene Deitch and produced by William L. Snyder. Deitch wrote most of the cartoons, with occasional assistance from Larz Bourne and Eli Bauer. Štěpán Koníček provided the musical score for the Deitch shorts. Sound effects were produced by electronic music composer Tod Dockstader and Deitch. The majority of vocal effects and voices in Deitch's films were provided by Allen Swift and Deitch.

Deitch states that, being a "UPA man", he was not a fan of the Tom and Jerry cartoons, thinking they were "needlessly violent". However, after being assigned to work on the series, he quickly realized that "nobody took [the violence] seriously", and it was merely "a parody of exaggerated human emotions". He also came to see what he perceived as the "biblical roots" in Tom and Jerry's conflict, similar to David and Goliath, stating "That's where we feel a connection to these cartoons: the little guy can win (or at least survive) to fight another day."

Since the Deitch/Snyder team had seen only a handful of the original Tom and Jerry shorts, and since the team produced their cartoons on a tighter budget of $10,000, the resulting films were considered surrealist in nature, though this was not Deitch's intention. The animation was limited and jerky in movement compared to the more fluid Hanna-Barbera shorts, and often utilized motion blur. Background art was done in a more simplistic, angular, Art Deco-esque style. The soundtracks featured sparse and echoic electronic music, futuristic sound effects, heavy reverb and dialogue that was mumbled rather than spoken. According to Jen Nessel of The New York Times, "The Czech style had nothing in common with these gag-driven cartoons."

Whereas Hanna-Barbera's shorts generally took place in and outside of a house, Deitch's shorts opted for more exotic locations, such as a 19th-century whaling ship, the jungles of Nairobi, an Ancient Greek acropolis, or the Wild West. In addition, Mammy Two Shoes was replaced as Tom's owner by a bald, overweight, short-tempered, middle-aged white man, who bore a striking resemblance to another Deitch character, Clint Clobber. Just like Spike the Bulldog, he was also significantly more brutal and violent in punishing Tom's actions as compared to previous owners, often beating and thrashing Tom repeatedly; the character and his extreme treatment of Tom was poorly received.

To avoid being linked to Communism, Deitch modified the Czech names of his crew in the opening credits of the shorts to look more conventional to English-speaking audiences, e.g. Štěpán Koníček became "Steven Konichek" and Václav Lídl became "Victor Little". These shorts are among the few Tom and Jerry cartoons not to carry the "Made In Hollywood, U.S.A." phrase on the end title card. Due to Deitch's studio being behind the Iron Curtain, the production studio's location is omitted entirely on it. After the 13 shorts were completed, Joe Vogel, the head of production, was fired from MGM. Vogel had approved of Deitch and his team's work, but MGM decided not to renew their contract after Vogel's departure. The final of the 13 shorts, Carmen Get It!, was released on December 21, 1962.

Deitch's shorts were commercial successes. In 1962, the Tom and Jerry series became the highest-grossing animated short film series of that time, dethroning Looney Tunes, which had held the position for 16 years. However, unlike the Hanna-Barbera shorts, none of Deitch's films were nominated for any Academy Awards. In retrospect, these shorts are often considered the worst of the Tom and Jerry theatrical output. Deitch stated that due to his team's inexperience as well as their low budget, he "hardly had a chance to succeed", and "well understand[s] the negative reactions" to his shorts. He believes "They could all have been better animated – truer to the characters – but our T&Js were produced in the early 1960s, near the beginning of my presence here, over a half-century ago as I write this!" Despite the criticism, Deitch's Tom and Jerry shorts are appreciated by some fans due to their uniquely surreal nature. The shorts were released on DVD in 2015 in Tom and Jerry: The Gene Deitch Collection.

Production formats

The 1960s entries were done in Metrocolor but returned to the standard Academy ratio and format.

=== Chuck Jones era (1963–1967) ===
After the last of the Deitch cartoons were released, Chuck Jones, who had been fired from his 30-plus year tenure at Warner Bros. Cartoons, started his own animation studio, Sib Tower 12 Productions (later renamed MGM Animation/Visual Arts), with partner Les Goldman. Beginning in 1963, Jones and Goldman went on to produce 34 more Tom and Jerry shorts, all of which carried Jones' distinctive style, and a slight psychedelic influence.

Jones had trouble adapting his style to Tom and Jerry's brand of humor, and a number of the cartoons favored full animation, personality and style over storyline. The characters underwent a slight change of appearance: Tom was given thicker eyebrows (resembling Jones' Grinch, Count Blood Count or Wile E. Coyote), a less complex look (including the color of his fur becoming gray), sharper ears, longer tail and furrier cheeks (resembling Jones' Claude Cat or Sylvester), while Jerry was given larger eyes and ears, a lighter brown color, and a sweeter, Porky Pig-like expression.

Some of Jones' Tom and Jerry cartoons are reminiscent of his work with Wile E. Coyote and the Road Runner, includes the uses of blackout gags and gags involving characters falling from high places. Jones co-directed the majority of the shorts with layout artist Maurice Noble. The remaining shorts were directed by Abe Levitow and Ben Washam, with Tom Ray directing two shorts built around footage from earlier Tom and Jerry cartoons directed by Hanna and Barbera, and Jim Pabian directed a short with Maurice Noble. Various vocal characteristics were made by Mel Blanc, June Foray and even Jones himself. These shorts contain a memorable opening theme, in which Tom first replaces the MGM lion, then is trapped inside the "O" of his name.

Though Jones's shorts were generally considered an improvement over Deitch's, they had varying degrees of critical success. MGM ceased production of Tom and Jerry shorts in 1967, by which time Jones had moved on to television specials and the feature film The Phantom Tollbooth. The shorts were released on DVD in 2009 on Tom and Jerry: The Chuck Jones Collection.

=== Tom and Jerry hit television ===
Beginning in 1965, the Hanna and Barbera Tom and Jerry cartoons began to appear on television in heavily edited versions. The Jones team was required to take the cartoons featuring Mammy Two Shoes and remove her by pasting over the scenes featuring her with new scenes. Most of the time, she was replaced with a similarly fat white Irish woman. Occasionally, as in Saturday Evening Puss, a thin white teenager took her place instead, with both characters voiced by June Foray.

Recent telecasts on Cartoon Network and Boomerang retain Mammy with new voiceover work performed by Thea Vidale to remove the stereotypical black jargon featured on the original cartoon soundtracks. The standard Tom and Jerry opening titles were removed as well. Instead of the roaring MGM Lion sequence, an opening sequence featuring different clips of the cartoons was used instead. The title cards were also changed. A pink title card with the name written in white font was used instead.

Debuting on CBS' Saturday morning schedule on September 25, 1965, Tom and Jerry moved to CBS Sundays in 1967 and remained there until September 17, 1972.

=== Second Hanna-Barbera era: The Tom and Jerry Show (1975–1977) ===
In 1975, Tom and Jerry were reunited with Hanna and Barbera, who produced The Tom and Jerry Show for Saturday mornings. These 48 seven-minute cartoon shorts were paired with Grape Ape and Mumbly cartoons, to create The Tom and Jerry/Grape Ape Show, The Tom and Jerry/Grape Ape/Mumbly Show, and The Tom and Jerry/Mumbly Show, all of which initially ran on ABC Saturday mornings between September 6, 1975, and September 3, 1977. In these cartoons, Tom and Jerry, now with a red bow tie, who had been enemies during their formative years, became nonviolent pals who went on adventures together, as Hanna-Barbera had to meet the stringent rules against violence for children's TV. This format has not been used in newer Tom and Jerry entries.

Around the same period, ABC's broadcast standards department also declined to carry the original theatrical Tom and Jerry shorts. Susan Futterman, who managed children's programming within the department from late 1976, cited excessive violence as the reason, even as the cartoons continued to air on competing networks at high ratings.

=== Filmation era (1980–1982) ===
Filmation Studios were commissioned by MGM Television to produce a Tom and Jerry TV series, The Tom and Jerry Comedy Show, which debuted in 1980 and featured new cartoons starring Droopy, Spike, Slick Wolf, and Barney Bear, not seen since the original MGM shorts. The Filmation Tom and Jerry cartoons were noticeably different from Hanna-Barbera's efforts, as they returned Tom and Jerry to the original chase formula, with a somewhat more "slapstick" humor format. This incarnation, much like the 1975 version, was not as well received by audiences as the originals, and lasted on CBS Saturday mornings from September 6, 1980, to September 4, 1982.

=== Tom and Jerry's new owners ===
In 1986, MGM was purchased by WTBS founder Ted Turner. Turner sold the company a short while later, but retained MGM's pre-1986 film library. Tom and Jerry became the property of Turner Entertainment Co., where the rights stand today via Warner Bros., and have in subsequent years appeared on Turner-run channels, such as TBS, TNT, Cartoon Network, The WB, Boomerang, and Turner Classic Movies.

=== Third Hanna-Barbera era: Tom & Jerry Kids (1990–1994) ===
One of the biggest trends for Saturday morning television in the 1980s and 1990s was the "babyfication" (child versions) of classic cartoon stars. On March 2, 1990, Tom & Jerry Kids, co-produced by Turner Entertainment Co. and Hanna-Barbera Productions (which was sold to Turner in 1991), debuted on Fox Kids, and aired for a few years on British children's block, CBBC. It featured a youthful version of the famous cat-and-mouse duo chasing each other. As with the 1975 H-B series, Jerry wears his red bowtie, while Tom now wears a red cap. Spike and his son Tyke, who now had talking dialogue, and Droopy and his son Dripple, appeared in back-up segments for the show, which ran until November 18, 1994. Tom & Jerry Kids was the last Tom and Jerry cartoon series produced in 4:3 (full screen) aspect ratio.

=== One-off productions (2001; 2005) ===
In 2001, a new television special titled Tom and Jerry: The Mansion Cat premiered on Boomerang. It featured Joe Barbera (who was also a creative consultant) as the voice of Tom's owner, whose face is never seen. In this cartoon, Jerry, housed in a habitrail, is as much of a house pet as Tom is, and their owner has to remind Tom to not "blame everything on the mouse".

In 2005, a new Tom and Jerry theatrical short, titled The Karate Guard, which had been written and directed by Barbera and Spike Brandt, storyboarded by Joseph Barbera and Iwao Takamoto and produced by Joseph Barbera, Spike Brandt, and Tony Cervone premiered in Los Angeles cinemas on September 27, 2005, as part of the celebration of Tom and Jerry's sixty-fifth anniversary. This marked Barbera's first return as a writer, director and storyboard artist on the series since his and Hanna's original MGM cartoon shorts, and last overall. He died shortly after production ended. Director/animator, Spike Brandt was nominated for an Annie award for best character animation. The short debuted on the Cartoon Network on January 27, 2006. The short was filmed in the standard Academy ratio and format.

=== Warner Bros. era (2006–present) ===
In 1996, Turner merged with Time Warner, the parent company of Warner Bros. The characters from the MGM library, including Tom and Jerry, were placed under the control of Warner Bros. Animation. A relaunch of the theatrical shorts series was planned for 2003 alongside a similar relaunch of the Looney Tunes theatrical shorts, but was canceled after the financial failure of Looney Tunes: Back in Action.

In 2006, a new series called Tom and Jerry Tales premiered. Thirteen half-hour episodes each consisting of three shorts were produced. Some of the segments, like The Karate Guard, had originally been produced and completed in 2003 and/or 2005 as part of the planned theatrical cartoon relaunch. The show debuted in markets outside the US and UK, before premiering in February 2006 on the UK version of Boomerang, and the following autumn in the US on Kids' WB on The CW. Tales is the first Tom and Jerry TV series that utilizes the original style of the classic shorts, along with the slapstick. Tales is the first Tom and Jerry production produced in 16:9 widescreen aspect ratio, but was cropped to 4:3 fullscreen aspect ratio when initially aired in the United States. The series was canceled in 2008, shortly before the Kids' WB block shut down.

Following Cartoon Network's 2012 reruns of Tom and Jerry Tales, the channel launched The Tom and Jerry Show (2014). Initially featuring two 11-minute segments, the series later shifted to 7-minute segments to better match the look and tone of the original theatrical shorts. Similar to other reboot works like Scooby-Doo! Mystery Incorporated and New Looney Tunes, several episodes the new series brought Tom and Jerry into contemporary environments, telling new stories and relocating the characters to more fantastic worlds, from a medieval castle to a mad scientist's lab. The series was produced by Warner Bros. Animation, with Sam Register serving as executive producer in collaboration with Darrell Van Citters and Ashley Postlewaite at Renegade Animation. Originally slated for a 2013 Cartoon Network premiere, the series was pushed back to April 9, 2014. It is the second Tom and Jerry production presented in 16:9 widescreen aspect ratio.

In November 2014, a two-minute sketch was shown as part of the Children in Need telethon in the United Kingdom. The sketch was produced as a collaboration with Warner Bros.

In May 2016, WB Kids began releasing excerpts from various Tom and Jerry works to the online platform YouTube. By January 2017, compilation videos of the Tom and Jerry franchise began to be released by WB Kids on the platform.

On February 20, 2021, Warner Bros. released two new shorts onto HBO Max titled Tom and Jerry Special Shorts to honor the 81st anniversary of Tom and Jerry, as well as to promote the 2021 film. These shorts share the style of the other HBO Max original Looney Tunes Cartoons, also produced by Warner Bros. Animation.

A new Tom and Jerry series made its debut on July 1, 2021, as a Max Original on HBO Max, called Tom and Jerry in New York, which basically served as a spin-off of The Tom and Jerry Show by having the exact same animation style and slapstick, except that the events take place in the city of New York City. It was loosely based on the 2021 film, as the humans in the series were shown with their faces intact.

On November 11, 2022, Cartoon Network in Japan premiered a new series of animated shorts, Tom and Jerry (Japanese: とむとじぇりー, romanized: Tomu to Jerī (Note: Generally, loanwords and non-Japanese names are transliterated in katakana, like トム (Tom) and ジェリー (Jerry). However, the series' title uses hiragana to spell out the names of Tom (とむ) and Jerry (じぇりー).)), marking the first Japanese production based on the property. Featuring the voices of Megumi Aratake (as Tom), Aya Yonekura (as Jerry) and Eri Tanaka and Nana Kumagai (as Tuffy), the shorts were animated by Fanworks in co-operation with Studio Nanahoshi. Ayu handled the character design and Captain Mirai composed the musical scores. The November 11, 2022 premiere coincided with Cartoon Network's celebration of Cheese Day, which is organized by cheese industry in Japan. In 2025, the series was renamed Tom and Jerry Gokko (Japanese: とむとじぇりーごっこ, romanized: Tomu to Jerī Gokko).

On July 25, 2023, the Southeast Asian version of Tom and Jerry animated shorts was announced, to be presented on Cartoon Network Asia alongside HBO Asia streaming platform HBO GO before it was aired globally. The animated shorts, which were set in Singapore, were produced by Warner Bros. Discovery Asia-Pacific's director of original kids content Carlene Tan, with animation by Aum Animation Studios India alongside Singapore-based Robot Playground Media and Chips and Toon Studios for both the stories and designs.

== Outside the United States ==
When shown on terrestrial television in the United Kingdom, from April 1967 to February 2001, usually on the BBC, Tom and Jerry cartoons were not edited for violence, and Mammy was retained. As well as having regular slots, mainly after the evening BBC News with around two shorts shown every evening and occasionally shown on children's network CBBC in the morning, Tom and Jerry served the BBC in another way. When faced with disruption to the schedules, for example when live broadcasts overran, the BBC would invariably turn to Tom and Jerry to fill any gaps, confident that it would retain much of an audience that might otherwise channel hop. This proved particularly helpful in 1993, when Noel's House Party had to be cancelled due to an IRA bomb scare at BBC Television Centre. Tom and Jerry was shown instead, bridging the gap until the next programme. In 2006, a mother complained to Ofcom about the smoking shown in the cartoons, since Tom often attempts to impress love interests with the habit, resulting in reports that the smoking scenes in Tom and Jerry films may be subject to censorship.

Due to its very limited use of dialogue, Tom and Jerry was easily translated into various foreign languages. Tom and Jerry began broadcasting in Japan in 1965. A 2005 nationwide survey taken in Japan by TV Asahi, sampling age groups from teenagers to adults in their sixties, ranked Tom and Jerry No. 85 in a list of the top 100 "anime" of all time. Their web poll taken after the airing of the list ranked it at No. 58 – the only non-Japanese animation on the list, and beating anime classics like Tsubasa: Reservoir Chronicle, A Little Princess Sara, and the ultra-classics Macross and Ghost in the Shell. In Japan, the word "anime" refers to all animation regardless of origin, not just Japanese animation.

Tom and Jerry serve as the long-time licensed mascots for Gifu-based Juroku Bank.

Tom and Jerry have long since been popular in Germany. The different shorts are usually linked together with key scenes from Jerry's Diary (1949), in which Tom reads about his and Jerry's past adventures. The cartoons are introduced with rhyming German language verse, and when necessary, a German voice spoke the translations of English labels on items and similar information.

In Yugoslavia, Tom and Jerry also received locally titled theatrical releases. Contemporary Slovenian cinema listings record screenings of Tom in Jerry - Oskarjevca in 1984 and 1986.

The show was aired in mainland China by CCTV in the mid-1980s to the early 1990s and was extremely popular at the time. Collections of the show are still a prominent feature in Chinese book stores.

In the Philippines, the series was aired on ABS-CBN from 1966 until its closure due to the country's declaration of martial law in 1972, with the later Hanna-Barbera shorts from Barbecue Brawl to Tot Watchers and all of Gene Deitch and Chuck Jones shorts. RPN aired most of Hanna-Barbera shorts from 1977 until 1989. ABS-CBN would later return to the air after the restoration of democracy in 1986 and air the same shorts as in the pre-martial law era. This lasted until the end of 1988.

In Indonesia, the series was aired on TPI (later re-branded as MNCTV) from the mid-1990s to early 2010s and RCTI during 2000s.

Even though Gene Deitch's shorts were created in Czechoslovakia (1960–1962), the first official TV release of Tom and Jerry were in 1988. It was one of the few cartoons of western origin broadcast in Czechoslovakia (1988) and Romania (until 1989) before the fall of the Soviet Union in 1989.

== Feature films ==
Tom and Jerry's first feature film appearance was in the 1945 MGM musical Anchors Aweigh, in which Jerry performs a dance number with Gene Kelly. In this scene, Tom made a cameo as a servant. Filmmakers had wanted Mickey Mouse for the scene, but Walt Disney had rejected the deal, as the Disney studio was focusing on its own cartoons to help pay off its debts after World War II. Eventually Disney lent out their effects wizard Joshua Meador to spruce up MGM's 1956 Forbidden Planet. William Hanna and Joe Barbera supervised animation for the scene.

In 1953, Tom and Jerry's second feature film appearance was swimming with Esther Williams in a dream sequence in another MGM musical, Dangerous When Wet.

On October 1, 1992, the first international release of Tom and Jerry: The Movie arrived when the film was released overseas to theaters in Europe and then domestically by Miramax Films on July 30, 1993, with future video and DVD releases that would be sold under Warner Home Video, which, following Disney's acquisition of Miramax and Turner's subsequent merger with Time Warner, had acquired the film's distribution rights. Barbera served as creative consultant for the picture, which was produced and directed by Phil Roman. The film was a musical with a structure similar to MGM's blockbusters, The Wizard of Oz and Singin' in the Rain.

In 2001, Warner Bros., which had, by then, merged with Turner and assumed its properties, released the duo's first direct-to-video film, Tom and Jerry: The Magic Ring, in which Tom covets a ring that grants mystical powers to the wearer, and has become accidentally stuck on Jerry's head. It was the last time Hanna and Barbera co-produced a Tom and Jerry cartoon together, as William Hanna died shortly after The Magic Ring was released.

Four years later, Bill Kopp scripted and directed two more Tom and Jerry DTV features for the studio, Tom and Jerry: Blast Off to Mars and Tom and Jerry: The Fast and the Furry, the latter one based on a story by Barbera. Both were released on DVD in 2005, marking the celebration of Tom and Jerry's 65th anniversary. In 2006, another direct-to-video film, Tom and Jerry: Shiver Me Whiskers, tells the story about the pair having to work together to find the treasure. Joe came up with the storyline for the next film, Tom and Jerry: A Nutcracker Tale, as well as the initial idea of synchronizing the on-screen actions to music from Tchaikovsky's Nutcracker Suite. This DTV film, directed by Spike Brandt and Tony Cervone, was Joe Barbera's last Tom and Jerry project due to his death in December 2006. The holiday-set animated film was released on DVD in late 2007 and dedicated to Barbera.

A new direct-to-video film, Tom and Jerry Meet Sherlock Holmes, was released on August 24, 2010. It is the first made-for-video Tom and Jerry film produced without any of the characters' original creators. The next direct-to-video film, Tom and Jerry and the Wizard of Oz, was released on August 23, 2011, and was the first made-for-video Tom and Jerry film made for Blu-ray. It had a preview showing on Cartoon Network. Robin Hood and His Merry Mouse was released on Blu-ray and DVD on October 2, 2012.

Tom and Jerry's Giant Adventure was released in 2013 on Blu-ray and DVD. Tom and Jerry: The Lost Dragon was released on DVD on September 2, 2014. Tom and Jerry: Spy Quest was released on DVD on June 23, 2015. Tom and Jerry: Back to Oz was released on DVD on June 21, 2016. Tom and Jerry: Willy Wonka and the Chocolate Factory was released on DVD on July 11, 2017.

A live action/3D animated hybrid film was directed by Tim Story and starred Chloë Grace Moretz, Michael Peña Colin Jost, Rob Delaney and Ken Jeong. The film was released on February 26, 2021.

On December 12, 2024, it was announced that a new animated Tom and Jerry feature film is in the works from Warner Bros. Pictures Animation, with Rashida Jones, Will McCormack and Michael Govier writing the script.

A feature-length computer-animated film titled Tom and Jerry: Forbidden Compass (Chinese: 猫和老鼠:星盘奇缘), directed by Zhang Gang and co-produced by China and the United States, premiered at the 27th Shanghai International Film Festival on June 21, 2025, and was released in China on August 9, 2025. It was later released in theaters in the United States on September 4, 2026.

== Controversies ==
A frame from the short The Truce Hurts. The characters in this shot have turned into black stereotypes after a passing car splashed mud on their faces. Scenes such as this are frequently highly edited or cut from modern broadcasts of Tom and Jerry.

Like many animated cartoons from the 1930s to the 1950s, Tom and Jerry featured racial stereotypes. After explosions, for example, characters with blasted faces would resemble blackface stereotypes, with large lips and bow-tied hair. Perhaps the most controversial element of the show is the character Mammy Two Shoes, a poor black maid who speaks in a stereotypical "black accent". Today, the blackface gags are often censored when these shorts are aired.

Following the 1949 re-issue of the 1943 Tom and Jerry short The Lonesome Mouse, the NAACP, which had begun protesting stereotypical and racist depictions of African-Americans in Hollywood cinema, began a campaign against the use of the maid character in the Tom and Jerry shorts. Lillian Randolph left her role as the voice of Mammy Two Shoes in 1952 to instead take a job on television in Amos & Andy, and Hanna and Barbera retired the character at that time.

In the 1960s, shorts featuring Mammy Two Shoes were re-animated in part by Chuck Jones' team at MGM, alongside their work on the newer entries produced by Jones, in order to be shown on television. These versions of the shorts replace the African-American maid with a white woman, voiced by June Foray with an Irish accent. These versions of the Tom and Jerry shorts were broadcast on television until the MGM catalog's acquisition by Turner in 1986. Turner redubbed Mammy Two Shoes' voice in these shorts in the mid-1990s to make the character sound less stereotypical.

Two shorts – His Mouse Friday, which depicts cannibals, and A Mouse in the House, which shows Mammy getting spanked repeatedly by Tom and Butch in the end resulting in racial abuse – have been removed from circulation. Two others in particular – Casanova Cat, which features a scene where Jerry's face is blackened by Tom with cigar smoke and he is forced to perform a minstrel dance, and Mouse Cleaning, where Tom is shown with blackface speaking in a stereotypical "Negro dialect" – were omitted from DVD/Blu-ray releases. Notably the other two – Fraidy Cat, showed Tom biting Mammy in the rear near the end, and The Mouse Comes to Dinner, including Jerry briefly dressing up as a Native American stereotype during the beginning – have Mammy edited in complete absence.

At the start of the 2005 Tom and Jerry Spotlight Collection: Vol 2. DVD set, a disclaimer by actress and comedian Whoopi Goldberg warns viewers about the potentially offensive material in the cartoons. Goldberg's disclaimer emphasizes that the racial and ethnic stereotypes present in the shorts were "wrong then and they are wrong today", borrowing a phrase used in disclaimers done for Warner Bros. Looney Tunes Golden Collection DVD sets. This disclaimer is also used in the Tom and Jerry Golden Collection: Volume 1 Blu-ray/DVD/digital release as well.

Mammy Two Shoes in a scene from the Tom and Jerry short Saturday Evening Puss, in which her full face was shown for the first time

The cartoons you are about to see are products of their time. They may depict some of the ethnic and racial prejudices that were commonplace in U.S. society. These depictions were wrong then and they are wrong today. While the following does not represent the Warner Bros. view of today's society, these cartoons are being presented as they were originally created, because to do otherwise would be the same as claiming that these prejudices never existed.

— Disclaimer by Whoopi Goldberg

Since 2020, all episodes featuring Mammy Two Shoes are no longer seen on Cartoon Network and Boomerang and are removed from the Boomerang app. There are other shorts (The Lonesome Mouse, (Note: This short, which was released during World War II (1943) contains a reference where Jerry paint marks on a picture of Tom's face like Adolf Hitler and then spits on it. This scene is cut out of reruns) Blue Cat Blues, (Note: The subplot of this short is considered dark since it had references of alcoholism and suicide.) and The Mouse from H.U.N.G.E.R. (Note: The beginning of this short contains rapid flickering from the projector, which this technique was notorious for inducing epileptic seizures.)) that are found inappropriate for the intended audiences rather than just having racist contents and are censored from the two channels as well.

In 2006, the British version of the Boomerang channel made plans to edit Tom and Jerry cartoons being aired in the UK where the characters were seen to be smoking. There was a subsequent investigation by UK media watchdog Ofcom. It has also taken the U.S. approach by censoring blackface gags, though this seems to be random as not all scenes of this type are cut. One Gene Deitch-era short, Buddies Thicker Than Water, is shortened as one scene involves drunkenness.

In 2013, it was reported that Cartoon Network of Brazil censored 27 shorts on the grounds of being "politically incorrect". In an official release, the channel confirmed that it had censored only two shorts, The Two Mouseketeers (Note: This short has a dark offscreen ending where Tom was guillotined.) and Heavenly Puss (Note: The subplot of this short is considered dark since it had a reference of damnation in Hell.) "by editorial issues and appropriateness of the content to the target audience—children of 7 to 11 years".

== In other media ==
=== Comic books ===
Tom and Jerry began appearing in comic books in 1942, as one of the features in Dell Comics' Our Gang Comics. In 1949, with MGM's live-action Our Gang shorts having ceased production five years earlier, the series was renamed Tom and Jerry Comics. That title ran 212 issues with Dell before being handed off to Western Publishing's line of Gold Key Comics, where it ran until issue #344 (June 1984). Tom and Jerry continued to appear in various comic books for the rest of the 20th century. Tom and Jerry comics were also extremely popular in Norway, Germany, Sweden, the UK, the Netherlands, Yugoslavia and Australia. A licensed European version has been drawn by Spanish artist Oscar Martin since 1986. Another licensed version was published in Yugoslavia, started in 1983 and drawn by a number of artists, including Zoran Kovačević, Bojan Đukić, Zdravko Zupan and Dušan Reljić.

=== Comic strip ===
Tom and Jerry
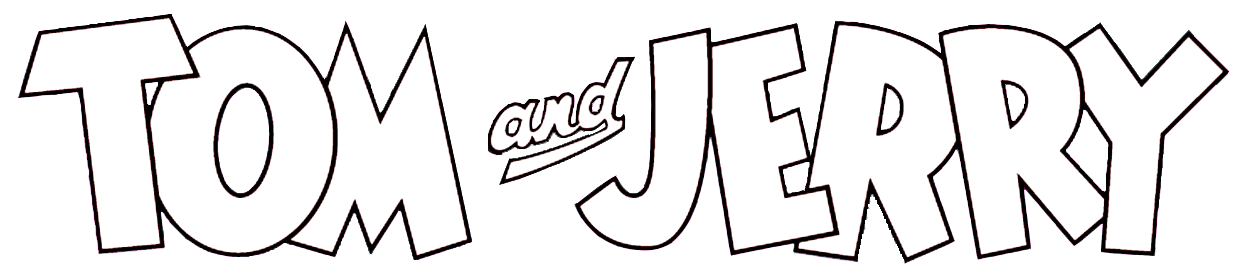
- Authors: Fred Quimby (1950–52); Kelly Jarvis (1989–94)
- Current status/schedule: Ended
- Launch date: April 1, 1950; 76 years ago
- End date: March 13, 1994; 32 years ago
- Syndicate: Editors Press Service (1989–94)
- Genre: Humor

A Tom and Jerry comic strip was syndicated from 1950 to 1952. Although credited to MGM animation studio head Fred Quimby, experts believe the strips were ghosted by Gene Hazelton and possibly Ernie Stanzoni and Dan Gormley. Tom and Jerry was revived as a comic strip from 1989 to 1994, syndicated to the South American market by Editors Press Service. The strip was produced by Kelley Jarvis during this era, with the exception of a short period in 1990–1991 when it was done by Paul Kupperberg & Rich Maurizio.

=== Tom to Jerry: Nanairo ===
Tom to Jerry: Nanairo (Japanese: とむとじぇりーナナイロ, romanized: Tomu to Jerī Nanairo, lit. 'Tom and Jerry: Seven Colors') is a short-lived series of Japanese comics authored by Chara Chara Makiart as a spin-off of Tom and Jerry. It was first featured in the August 2021 issue of the Nakayoshi magazine. Nanairo, along with Chara Chara Makiart's other project Harapeko Penguin Cafe, was cancelled in December 2021 as Kodansha (Nakayoshi's publisher) has terminated its contract with the creative unit after one of Makiart members was found guilty for sexually assaulting a minor.

=== Musical adaptation ===
A musical, or music drama (音楽劇, ongaku geki), adaptation of the cartoon series, titled Tom and Jerry: Purr-Chance to Dream (トムとジェリー 夢よもう一度, Tomu to Jerī Yume yo Mōichido), debuted in Japan in 2019 in advance of the series' upcoming 80th anniversary. The musical was composed by Masataka Matsutoya, staged by Seiji Nozoe, and written by Shigeki Motoiki.

== Cultural influences ==
Throughout the years, the term and title Tom and Jerry became practically synonymous with never-ending rivalry, as much as the related "cat and mouse fight" metaphor has. Yet in Tom and Jerry it was not the more powerful Tom who usually came out on top. In 2005, TV Asahi ranked Tom and Jerry as 58th of the Top 100 Animated TV Series in Japan overall, outranking titles like Rurouni Kenshin, Initial D, and even Macross. In January 2009, IGN named Tom and Jerry as the 66th best in the Top 100 Animated TV Shows.

=== In popular culture ===
Wile E. Coyote and the Road Runner were originally meant to parody Tom and Jerry. In 1973, the magazine National Lampoon referenced Tom and Jerry in a violence-filled comic book parody, Kit 'n' Kaboodle. In The Simpsons, The Itchy & Scratchy Show is a spoof of Tom and Jerry—a "cartoon within a cartoon". In an episode of the series titled "Krusty Gets Kancelled", Worker and Parasite, a replacement cartoon for Itchy & Scratchy, is a reference to Soviet-era animation. The Italian adult black comedy comic strip Squeak the Mouse created by artist Massimo Mattioli satirizes Tom and Jerry, taking the content to extreme levels, which includes gory, horror, violence, and explicit sexual content.

Tom and Jerry made a cameo appearance in the 1992 animated TV special The Rosey and Buddy Show.

In an interview found on the DVD releases, several Mad TV cast members stated that Tom and Jerry is one of their biggest influences for slapstick comedy. Also in the Cartoon Network show MAD, Tom and Jerry appear in three segments: "Celebrity Birthdays", "Mickey Mouse Exterminator Service", and "Tom and Jury". Johnny Knoxville from Jackass has stated that watching Tom and Jerry inspired many of the stunts in the films.

In 1995, Listerine mouthwash brand launched an ad campaign for their product, targeting young buyers. The ad featured some scenes of several Tom & Jerry classic cartoon.

In 2003, British agency Ogilvy & Mather produced a 40-minute Ford UK commercial promoting their then-recent Ford Mondeo, which featured Tom and Jerry. In the commercial, the characters break out of a television, wrecking the living room, and eventually breaking the door and going outside. Jerry then enters the Ford Mondeo via the exhaust pipe, and Tom gets chased away by a bulldog. The commercial was directed by Jeff Stark, written by Dale Winton, drafted by Paul Frost, and produced by Kim Parrot and Cathy Green. Animation was done by Jerry Forder at Icepics Animation Studios, with backgrounds by Monica Herman and art direction by Hamish Pinnell and John Bramble. Sound design was done by James Saunders. The music was composed by Goldstein. Post-production was done by Paul Hannaford at Rushes.

The supreme leader of Iran, Ali Khamenei likened the rivalry between the United States and the Islamic Republic of Iran to Tom and Jerry, with the United States in the role of Tom and Iran in the role of Jerry. Time Magazine noted that late Palestinian leader Yasser Arafat admired Tom and Jerry because, in his view, the mouse always outwits the cat, mirroring how Palestinians, seen as the underdog, persist despite adversity.

Pac-Man's playful chase dynamic was inspired by the back-and-forth antics seen in Tom and Jerry, as stated by creator Toru Iwatani. Tom and Jerry was the primary influence for Xilam's Oggy and the Cockroaches, which employs silent comedy and slapstick humour much like Tom and Jerry.

Japanese manga One Piece was significantly influenced by Tom and Jerry, which was confirmed by Eiichiro Oda, the creator of the series.

The rivalry between Kamen Rider My-Th and Kamen Rider Maou in Kamen Rider My-Th that premiered in Japan on September 6, 2026, was influenced by Tom and Jerry that is based on its English idiom.

Tom appears in the 197th episode of the web series Death Battle, to face off against Wile E. Coyote himself in a battle of unsuccessful cartoon chasers. This episode was selected to happen by votes from fans, beating out several other popular ideas as well. The episode was initially slated for 2024, but was canceled after Death Battle's company Rooster Teeth was shut down by its parent company Warner Bros. However, show creators Ben Singer, Chad James, Austin Harper and Sam Mitchell managed to secure the Death Battle intellectual property, and started a Kickstarter to continue the show. The episode released on June 22, 2025, and declared Wile E. the winner due to his superior physical stats, arsenal, and "toonliness."

== Home media ==
In the pre-video era, Tom and Jerry cartoons were a popular subject for 8mm home movies, with the UK-based Walton Films issuing dozens of titles as colour one-reel Super 8 films, in both silent and sound editions. Walton's agreement with MGM obligated them to release the films in slightly edited form, even though the single-reel format would have comfortably accommodated the cartoons' seven to eight minute running time. These releases were discontinued before the dawn of the 1980s.

As early as 1981, MGM/CBS released Tom and Jerry Cartoon Festival, the very first Tom and Jerry release on numerous home video formats, including VHS, Betamax, CED Videodisc, and Laserdisc, and mostly consisted the original Hanna-Barbera-era shorts (excluding the CinemaScope cartoons). The VHS and Beta versions released a total of four volumes up through 1984, while releases on the other two formats were discontinued after the second volume due to marketing difficulties of Laserdisc and CED players during that time period.

Between the late 1980s and early 1990s, MGM/UA Home Video released a series of Tom and Jerry VHS tapes under their Cartoon Movie Stars banner. Also in the early 1990s, MGM/UA released a released three volumes of Laserdisc box sets for collectors, entitled The Art of Tom & Jerry. Volumes 1 and 2 contain all of the Hanna and Barbera era shorts in chronological order, with the CinemaScope shorts being presented in letterboxed versions. The cartoons were mostly presented uncut with three exceptions: His Mouse Friday, where the cannibal's dialogue had been removed, Saturday Evening Puss, which is the re-drawn version with June Foray's voice added, and The Framed Cat where Mammy-Two Shoes' dialogue had been redubbed. A third volume to The Art of Tom & Jerry was released and contains all of the Chuck Jones-era Tom and Jerry shorts; however, it omitted any of the Gene Deitch-era shorts. This was the final home media release of Tom and Jerry release by MGM.

In 1999, three years after Time Warner's acquisition of Turner Broadcasting, the rights to Tom and Jerry (along with the rest of MGM's Pre-1986 library) moved from MGM to Warner Bros. with Warner Home Video handling all future releases. DVD and Blu-Ray releases of Tom and Jerry have encountered difficulties in terms of restoration, due to most of the original film negatives to the Pre-1951 MGM cartoons being destroyed in a vault fire in the 1970s, leaving only inferior duplicate copies.

In April 2004, Warner Home Video released Tom and Jerry: The Classic Collection in Regions 2 and 4; a six disc double-sided DVD box-set in the United Kingdom, and 12 single-layer individual DVD volumes issued throughout Western Europe and Australia. The set includes almost every single Tom and Jerry cartoon released between 1940 and 1967 in chronological order; with the exceptions of The Million Dollar Cat and Busy Buddies, which were not included for unexplained reasons. The cartoons on this set were sourced from unrestored 1980s Turner broadcast prints as seen on TNT and Cartoon Network, and therefore many of the shorts were censored: with many blackface gags being cut (including His Mouse Friday being heavily edited) and almost all of Mammy Two Shoes' dialogue being redubbed by Thea Vidale. Also the CinemaScope cartoons were presented in 4:3 pan and scan, with the exceptions of The Egg and Jerry, Tops with Pops and Feedin' the Kiddie which were released in non-anamorphic widescreen as seen on The Art of Tom and Jerry laserdiscs. The Classic Collection also contained no bonus material. Unlike the U.S. DVDs however, Mouse Cleaning and Casanova Cat were included on these sets and were presented uncut.

There have been several Tom and Jerry DVDs released in Region 1 (United States and Canada), such as the Tom and Jerry's Greatest Chases DVDs. In October 2004, Warner Home Video released the first volume of Tom and Jerry Spotlight Collection; a two-disc set with an assortment of Tom and Jerry cartoons presented in random order. Much like the U.K Classic Collection, most of the cartoons were unrestored and sourced from the '80s Turner prints, however the CinemaScope cartoons were restored in their correct 2.35:1 aspect ratios and released in 16:9 anamorphic widescreen. The Spotlight Collection also contained numerous special features. In October 2005, Volume 2 of the Spotlight Collection was released - which much like the first volume had a random assortment of cartoons, sourced from unrestored Turner Prints (except the CinemaScope cartoons), and contained numerous extras - including an introduction by Whoopi Goldberg about the politically incorrect content in some cartoons. Despite this however, some of the cartoons on Volumes 1 & 2 were censored: having cuts and redubbed Mammy Two Shoes dialogue. Warner Home Video eventually offered a disc replacement program offering fixing these errors, and modern pressings of Volumes 1 & 2 present the cartoons uncut. A third and final volume of the Spotlight Collection was released in September 2007 - bringing a total of 112 of the 114 original Hanna and Barbera-era Tom and Jerry shorts having been released. Volume 3 received a negative response from fans due to His Mouse Friday being edited (with an extreme zoom-in towards the end to avoid showing a pygmy cannibal), the CinemaScope cartoon Pup on a Picnic being cropped to 16:9, and the cartoons Mouse Cleaning and Casanova Cat being excluded from these sets due to brief blackface gags.

On June 23, 2009, Warner Home Video released the Tom and Jerry: The Chuck Jones Collection DVD, which contains all thirty-four shorts as well as special features. Prior to 2015, the Gene Deitch-era Tom and Jerry shorts saw limited availability on home media, with the most notable release being on the U.K. Classic Collection box-set. The Gene Deitch-era Tom and Jerry shorts were released in a one-disc set titled Tom and Jerry: The Gene Deitch Collection in June 2015.

In October 2011, Warner Home Video released the first volume of the Tom and Jerry Golden Collection on DVD and Blu-ray. Unlike the Spotlight Collections, the Golden Collections were aimed at adult collectors. This time the cartoons were presented uncut, in chronological order and restored from color reversal intermediates resulting in a much more pristine image quality. Despite this however, 12 cartoons (Puss n' Toots, The Bowling Alley Cat, Sufferin' Cats!, The Lonesome Mouse, The Zoot Cat, The Million-Dollar Cat, Puttin' on the Dog, Mouse Trouble, Quiet Please!, The Milky Waif, Heavenly Puss and Jerry's Diary) were sourced from 1960s Metrocolor prints, resulting in a washed out image, which drew some criticism from fans and collectors. A second volume of the Golden Collection series was scheduled to be released in June 2013. However, in February 2013, it was announced by TVShowsOnDVD.com that, much like the Spotlight Collections, Mouse Cleaning and Casanova Cat would not be included. The product received negative reviews on Amazon and various other websites, which eventually led Warner Home Video to cancel Volume 2 and the Golden Collection series. The transfers made for Volume 2 (excluding Mouse Cleaning and Casanova Cat) were eventually made available on the ITunes Store and YouTube Movies.

In February 2025, to coincide with Tom and Jerry's 85th anniversary, Warner Archive Collection released Tom and Jerry: The Complete CinemaScope Collection, a single disc Blu-Ray set which contained all 23 CinemaScope Tom and Jerry cartoons presented in their correct aspect ratios - including Pup on a Picnic. The set also included three non-Tom and Jerry CinemaScope cartoons by Hanna and Barbera - Good Will to Men (1955), Give and Tyke and Scat Cats (both 1957) - which were included as extras. This set received mostly positive feedback from fans and collectors.

In September 2025, Warner Archive announced Tom and Jerry: The Golden Era Anthology, a multi-disc Blu-Ray set collecting the entirety of the original 114 Hanna-Barbera era shorts. Tom and Jerry: The Golden Era Anthology was released on December 2, 2025 and presented all 114 shorts in chronological order and uncut - including Mouse Cleaning and Casanova Cat - as well as an unedited version of His Mouse Friday, over three hours of bonus material and a 28-page booklet.

== Theatrical shorts ==
The following cartoons won the Academy Award for Best Short Subject: Cartoons:

- 1943: The Yankee Doodle Mouse
- 1944: Mouse Trouble
- 1945: Quiet Please!
- 1946: The Cat Concerto
- 1948: The Little Orphan
- 1952: The Two Mouseketeers
- 1953: Johann Mouse

These cartoons were nominated for the Academy Award for Best Short Subject: Cartoons, but did not win:

- 1940: Puss Gets the Boot
- 1941: The Night Before Christmas
- 1947: Dr. Jekyll and Mr. Mouse
- 1949: Hatch Up Your Troubles
- 1950: Jerry's Cousin
- 1954: Touché, Pussy Cat!

== Television ==
=== Television shows ===
Series no.	Title	Seasons	Episodes	Broadcast run	Production company	Original network
1	The Tom & Jerry Show	1	16	1975	Hanna-Barbera Productions; MGM Television	ABC
2	The Tom and Jerry Comedy Show	1	15	1980	Filmation; MGM Television	CBS
3	Tom & Jerry Kids	4	65	1990–93	Hanna-Barbera Productions; Turner Entertainment	Fox Kids
4	Tom and Jerry Tales	2	26	2006–08	Turner Entertainment; Warner Bros. Animation; Warner Bros. Family Entertainment	Kids' WB
5	The Tom and Jerry Show	5	118	2014–21	Turner Entertainment; Warner Bros. Animation	Cartoon Network (2014–16); Boomerang SVOD (2017–21); Cartoon Network App (2021)
6	Tom and Jerry Special Shorts	1	2	2021	Turner Entertainment; Warner Bros. Animation	HBO Max
7	Tom and Jerry in New York	2	13	2021	Turner Entertainment; Warner Bros. Animation	HBO Max
8	Tom and Jerry Gokko	1	14	2022–present	Fanworks; Studio Nanahosi; Turner Entertainment; Warner Bros. Japan	Cartoon Network (Japan)
9	Tom and Jerry Singapore	1	7	2023	Aum Animation Studios; Turner Entertainment; Warner Bros. Animation	Cartoon Network (Asia); HBO Go
10	Tom and Jerry Time	1	2	2025	Turner Entertainment; Warner Bros. Animation	Cartoonito YouTube channels

=== Packaged shows and programming blocks ===
Series no.	Title	Broadcast run	Original channel
1	Tom and Jerry (1960s packaged show)	1965–72	CBS
2	Tom and Jerry	1967–2001	BBC
3	Tom and Jerry's Funhouse on TBS	1986–95	TBS
4	Cartoon Network's Tom and Jerry Show	1992–2004	Cartoon Network

=== Television specials ===
#	Title	Release date
1	Hanna-Barbera's 50th: A Yabba Dabba Doo Celebration	July 17, 1989
2	Tom and Jerry: Santa's Little Helpers	October 7, 2014
3	A Fundraising Adventure (Children in need special)	November 14, 2014

== See also ==
- Tom and Jerry filmography
- Tom and Jerry Tales § Episodes
- Golden age of American animation
- Metro-Goldwyn-Mayer cartoon studio and MGM Animation/Visual Arts
- List of works produced by Hanna-Barbera Productions
- List of Hanna-Barbera characters
- Oggy and the Cockroaches
- Pakdam Pakdai
- Tommies and Jerries, respective nicknames for generic British and German soldiers during the World Wars.
