= Gene Deitch =

American illustrator, animator, and film director (1924–2020)

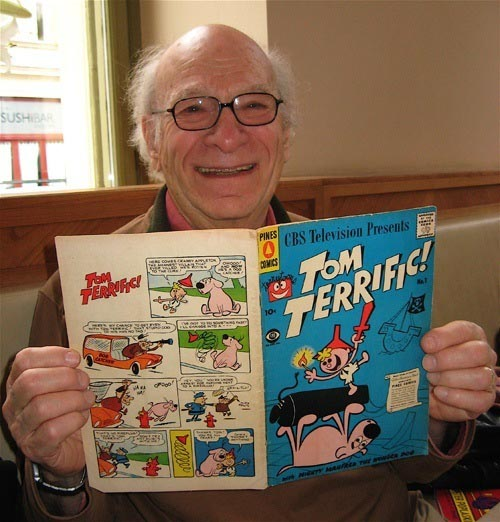
- Gene Deitch in 2007
- Born: Eugene Merril Deitch; August 8, 1924; Chicago, Illinois, U.S.
- Died: April 16, 2020 (aged 95); Prague, Czech Republic
- Citizenship: United States
- Occupations: Illustrator, animator, director
- Years active: 1945–2008
- Spouses: Marie (m. 1943; div. before 1964); Zdenka Najmanová (m. 1964)
- Children: 3, including Kim
- Awards: Inkpot Award (2013)
- Website: Archived at archive.org

Eugene Merril "Gene" Deitch (August 8, 1924 – April 16, 2020) was an American illustrator, animator, comics artist, and film director who was based in Prague from the 1960s until his death in 2020. Deitch was known for creating animated cartoons such as Munro, Tom Terrific, and Nudnik, as well as his work on the Popeye and Tom and Jerry series.

== Early life ==
Deitch was born in Chicago on August 8, 1924, the son of Jewish parents Joseph Deitch, a salesman, and Ruth Delson Deitch. In 1929, the family moved to California, and Deitch attended school in Hollywood. He graduated from Los Angeles High School in 1942.

== Early career ==
After graduating, Deitch began working for North American Aviation, drawing aircraft blueprints. In 1943, he was drafted and underwent pilot training before catching pneumonia and was honorably discharged in May of the following year. From 1940 to 1951, Deitch contributed covers and interior art to the jazz magazine The Record Changer. In the 1950s, Deitch was an early supporter and audio engineer for Connie Converse, one of the first American singer-songwriters, recording sessions that made up her debut album How Sad, How Lovely. Converse appeared once on CBS television due in part to Deitch's connections with the network, but otherwise found little success and eventually abandoned music only to be rediscovered decades later, through recordings Deitch had made of her music in 1954.

== Animation career ==
In 1955, Deitch took an apprenticeship at the animation studio United Productions of America (UPA), and later became the creative director of Terrytoons, creating such characters as Sidney the Elephant, Gaston Le Crayon, Tom Terrific, and Clint Clobber. Beginning in 1955, while working at UPA, Deitch wrote and drew the United Feature Syndicate comic strip The Real-Great Adventures of Terr’ble Thompson!, Hero of History, starring a courageous child in fantastical adventures. A skit about Terr'ble Thompson had been recorded by Little Golden Records, with actor Art Carney and bandleader Mitch Miller participating. That led to the daily strip, which ran from Sunday, October 16, 1955, to April 14, 1956. In early 1958, his theatrical cartoon Sidney's Family Tree was nominated for an Academy Award. In August 1958, he was fired from Terrytoons and set up his own studio in New York called Gene Deitch Associates, Inc., which primarily produced television commercials.

When the client Rembrandt Films promised to fund Munro, an animated theatrical short Deitch wanted to create, Deitch relocated to the company's base in Prague, Czechoslovakia, in October 1959. He originally planned to spend only ten days in Prague. Still, after meeting his future wife, Zdenka, he decided to settle permanently in the city. Munro premiered in Czechoslovakia in September 1960 and in the U.S. on October 5, 1961, as a short preceding Breakfast at Tiffany's. It won an Academy Award for Best Animated Short Film in 1961, the first short created outside of the United States to be so honored. Munro was preserved by the Academy Film Archive in 2004.

From 1960 to 1963, Deitch was hired by Rembrandt to direct Popeye cartoons for television for King Features, and from 1961 to 1962 he directed 13 new Tom and Jerry shorts for MGM. Being a "UPA man", Deitch had misgivings about the latter property, thinking they were "needlessly violent". However, after being assigned to work on the series, he quickly realized that "nobody took [the violence] seriously", and it was merely "a parody of exaggerated human emotions". He also came to see what he perceived as the "biblical roots" in Tom and Jerry's conflict, similar to David and Goliath, stating "That's where we feel a connection to these cartoons: the little guy can win (or at least survive) to fight another day." Contemporary critics often regarded Deitch's shorts as the worst in the Tom and Jerry series; Deitch said some fans wrote positive letters to him, stating that his Tom and Jerry shorts were their personal favorites.

Alongside Rembrandt's head William L. Snyder, Deitch co-produced and directed a series of TV shorts of Krazy Kat for King Features from 1962 to 1964. The Bluffers, which was based on one of Deitch's ideas, was also co-produced by him. He directed the 1966 film Alice of Wonderland in Paris. In 1966, he worked with Czech animator Jiří Trnka on a feature-length animated film adaptation of The Hobbit. However, producer Snyder could not secure the funds, and in order to not let the rights for the novel expire, he asked Deitch to produce a short film adaptation in 30 days. Deitch and illustrator Adolf Born made a 13-minute animated film never intended for distribution; the film was long considered lost until it was rediscovered by Snyder's son and released on YouTube in 2012. Also in 1966, Deitch created a young girl adventurer in Terrible Tessie.

From 1969 until his retirement in 2008, Deitch was the leading animation director for the Connecticut organization Weston Woods Studios, adapting children's picture books. Deitch adapted 37 films for Weston Woods, from Drummer Hoff in 1969 to Voyage to the Bunny Planet in 2008. His studio was located in Prague near the Barrandov Studios, where many major films were shot. In 2003, Deitch was awarded the Annie Awards' Winsor McCay Award by ASIFA-Hollywood for a lifetime contribution to the art of animation.

== Personal life and death ==
Deitch met his first wife, Marie, when they both worked at North American Aviation, and they married in 1943. Their three sons, Kim, Simon, and Seth Deitch, are artists and writers for underground and alternative comics.

Several days after arriving in Prague in October 1959, Deitch met Zdenka Najmanová, the production manager at the studio Bratři v triku where he worked. They married in 1964. Deitch's memoir, For the Love of Prague, is based on his experience of being what he called "the only free American living and working in Prague during 30 years of the Communist Party dictatorship". According to Deitch, although he was followed by the StB and his phone was tapped, he was never aware of their presence and was never interrogated nor arrested. In 2008, Deitch retired from making cartoons.

Deitch died in Prague on April 16, 2020, at the age of 95. Shortly before his death, Deitch had noted intestinal problems.
