= Rembrandt Films =

Czech production company founded in 1949

- Founded: 1949; 77 years ago
- Founder: William L. Snyder
- Headquarters: Prague, Czech Republic (formerly Czechoslovakia)
- Key people: Adam Snyder; Patricia Giniger Snyder; Gene Deitch
- Divisions: Rembrandt Communications; Rembrandt Animation; Rembrandt Video Productions
- Website: http://rembrandtfilms.com/

Rembrandt Films is a Czech production company founded by American film producer William L. Snyder in 1949, and revived by Adam Snyder in 1995. It began as an importer of films from Europe and expanded into animated film production.

Gene Deitch directed for the company both his own films and cartoons outsourced from American studios such as MGM (Tom and Jerry), and King Features Syndicate (Popeye, Krazy Kat, Snuffy Smith and Beetle Bailey). He also worked on the Michelin X commercials.

Rembrandt Films is now run by the son of William Snyder, Adam Snyder, and his wife Patricia Giniger Snyder. Rembrandt Films is an umbrella company for Rembrandt Communications, Rembrandt Animation and Rembrandt Video Productions. It conducts animation, video production, and business writing.

== Notable works ==
=== Animation ===
- Munro
- Tom and Jerry (co-produced with MGM)
- Popeye (co-produced with King Features Syndicate)
- Nudnik
- Krazy Kat (co-produced with King Features Syndicate)
- Alice of Wonderland in Paris
- Madeline
- Michelin X commercials

=== Documentaries ===
- Silent Pioneers (Emmy Nominee for Best Program)
- Girona, The Mother of Israel: The Jews of Catalonia
- Caring for Cambodia
- The Children of Oswiecim Remember
- The Technion: Turning Tomorrow's Dreams into Today's Realities
- CADCA: The Dangers of Underage Drinking
- CADCA's Dose of Prevention Award
- Finding Security in an Insecure World
- Turning Passion into Promise to End Duchenne
- Hale House: It's All About the Children
- Hale House: The Mother Hale Way
- A Torah Returns
- The Dreyfus Affair: A Current Affair
- The Many Faces of the Sephardim
- Come Back to the Lower East Side
- In Touch for Life
- The Four Energy Gates (Dr. Nan Lu)
