= Nono =

Nono may refer to:

== Places ==
- Nono, Argentina, a municipality in the Province of Córdoba
- Nono, Ecuador, a parish in the municipality of Quito in the province of Pichincha
- Nono, Illubabor, Oromia (woreda), Ethiopia, or Nono Sele
  - Nono, Illubabor, Oromia (town), in Nono woreda
- Nono, West Shewa, Oromia, Ethiopia, a woreda

== Animals ==
- Black nono (Simulium buissoni), a midge species on the Marquesas Islands in Polynesia, with the common name nono or no-no
- White nono (Leptoconops albiventris), a midge species on the Marquesas Islands in Polynesia, with the common name nono or no-no

== People ==
- Nonô (footballer, 1899–1931), full name Claudionor Gonçalves da Silva, Brazilian football forward
- Nonô (footballer, born 1940), full name Cláudionor Reinaldo Franco, Brazilian football defender
- Nono (footballer, born 1991), a Spanish winger for CD Tenerife, full name David González Plata
- Nono (footballer, born 1993), a Spanish midfielder, full name José Antonio Delgado Villar
- Nonô (musician) (born 1997), a Brazilian musician
- Nōno Chieko (born 1935), a Japanese politician
- Nonô Figueiredo (born 1971), a Brazilian auto racing driver
- Nono Katjingisua (born 1967), Namibian politician
- Nono Lubanzadio (born 1980), a Congolese football player
- Nono Maloyi (born 1968), a South African politician
- Ali Al-Nono (born 1980), a Yemeni football player
- Grace Nono, a female vocalist from the Philippines
- Hoda Nono, the Bahraini Ambassador to the United States
- Luigi Nono (1924–1990), an Italian composer
- Luigi Nono (painter) (19th century)`
- Kimito Nono (born 2002) Japanese professional footballer
- Sumika Nono (born 1987) Japanese actress

== Nicknames ==
- Norbert Krief, a French rock guitarist
- Nordahl Lelandais (b. 1983), a French ex-military, involved in criminal cases
- Pope Pius IX, whose Italian name is Pio Nono
- Nozomi Tsuji, a Japanese singer
- Andrés Vázquez, a Spanish bullfighter known as "El Nono"

== Fictional characters ==
- Nono (Diebuster), a character in the anime series Diebuster
- Nono, a character in the anime series Planetes
- Nono, a small robot in the anime series Ulysses 31
- Nono (のの), a shy blue-haired shrine maiden in the anime series Popotan
- Nono, a moogle in the games Final Fantasy Tactics Advance, Final Fantasy XII, and Final Fantasy XII: Revenant Wings
- Nono, a character in the anime series Toriko
- Noo-Noo, a character in the television series Teletubbies
- Nono Hana, the protagonist in the anime series Hugtto! PreCure
- Nono Ichinose, a character in the manga Hitohira

== Other ==
- NONO or Non-POU domain-containing octamer-binding protein, a protein that in humans is encoded by the NONO gene
- No-hitter, also called a no-no, a baseball game in which one team has no hits
- IX Nono Reparto Arditi, a Special Forces unit of the current Italian Army

== See also ==
- "Nobody but Me", Isley Brothers' song noted for repeating the word "no"
- No-no (disambiguation)
