= List of Tom & Jerry Kids episodes =

Tom & Jerry Kids is a Fox Kids animated television series. It was broadcast for four seasons from 1990 to 1993.

== Series overview ==
Season	Segments	Episodes	Originally released	
Season	Segments	Episodes	First released	Last released
1	39	13	September 8, 1990	December 1, 1990
2	39	13	September 14, 1991	December 7, 1991
3	78	26	September 12, 1992	December 13, 1992
4	39	13	September 11, 1993	December 4, 1993

== Episodes ==
The segments indicate in colors by which characters starred in them:

- Blue = Tom & Jerry Kids (99 segments)
- Red = Droopy & Dripple (66 segments)
- Sky Blue = Spike & Tyke (16 segments)
- Maroon = Urfo & Buzz (1 segment)
- Green = Wildmouse (2 segments)
- Orange = Slowpoke Antonio (2 segments)
- Purple = Swampy Fox and Gator Brothers (1 segment)
- Light Blue = Bernie Bird (2 segments)
- Tan = Kyle the Cat (1 segment)
- Cyan = Mouse Scouts (1 segment)
- Lime = Blast-Off Buzzard (2 segments)
- Pink = Calaboose Cal (2 segments)

=== Season 1 (1990) ===
No. overall	No. in season	Title	Written by	Original release date
1a	1a	"Flippin' Fido"	Jim Ryan; Directed by: Ray Patterson	September 8, 1990
At night, Tom chases Jerry in a department store but a watchdog is pursuing Tom, so Tom distracts him with Frisbees.
1b	1b	"Dakota Droopy & the Lost Dutch Boy Mine"	Jim Ryan	September 8, 1990
Dakota Droopy and his son Dripple set out to find gold, while claim-jumper McWolf tries to steal the gold for himself.
1c	1c	"Dog Daze Afternoon"	Marty Murphy	September 8, 1990
Tom relieves all the neighborhood dogs of their leashes so the dog catcher can capture them, but Jerry springs them out from the dog catcher's truck. Suddenly, Tom wakes up from a nap and sees all of the dogs in his house and they chase him.
2a	2a	"Toys Will Be Toys"	Jim Ryan	September 15, 1990
Tom pursues Jerry in a toy store at night.
2b	2b	"Droopy Delivers"	Pat Ventura	September 15, 1990
McWolf tries to ruin Droopy and Dripple's pizza business by getting rid of them and taking over their pizza business.
2c	2c	"My Pal"	Jim Ryan	September 15, 1990
During his chase with Jerry, Tom accidentally frees Clyde's head from a flower pot and soon regrets his actions when Clyde tries to help the kitten to catch the mouse but fails.
3a	3a	"Prehistoric Pals"	Jack Hanrahan	September 22, 1990
Long ago in an era known as the Stone Age, Jerry befriends a baby dinosaur after rescuing him as Tom pursues them both.
3b	3b	"Super Droop & Dripple Boy Meet the Yolker"	Jim Ryan	September 22, 1990
Super Droop and Dripple Boy must stop the Yolker and his crime spree at all costs.
3c	3c	"Marvelous Marvin"	Sandy Fries	September 22, 1990
Tom tries to capture Jerry so he can be a spokesperson for a cat food company when a cat actor named Marvin ends up being replaced with him.
4a	4a	"Bat Mouse"	Dennis Marks	September 29, 1990
After his many failed attempts, Jerry uses his Bat belt tool to call Bat Mouse for help to teach Tom a lesson.
4b	4b	"Puss 'n Pups"	Pat Ventura	September 29, 1990
Spike teaches Tyke how to chase cats and forces Kyle to be Tyke's target.
4c	4c	"Outer Space Rover"	Dennis Marks	September 29, 1990
A space dog named Urfo gets left behind and befriends Jerry as he's being chased by Tom.
5a	5a	"The Vermin"	Eric Alter	October 6, 1990
After an all-night birthday party, Tom tries to sleep, but Jerry's electric guitar keeps him awake and he throws Jerry out of the house. Later, Jerry joins his favorite rock n' roll band known as "The Vermins".
5b	5b	"Aerobic Droopy"	Sandy Fries	October 6, 1990
Droopy and Dripple open up a new aerobic studio right next to McWolf's aerobic studio who tries to get Miss Vavoom to come on over to his aerobics studio.
5c	5c	"Mouse Scouts"	Jim Ryan	October 6, 1990
Tom thinks that Jerry and his mouse scouts are incessantly stealing his food before he tries capturing them, but a bear makes things worse. Note: The only episode in Season 1 where the same title card music is used in all 3 cartoons.
6a	6a	"Sugar Belle Loves Tom, Sometimes"	Sandy Fries	October 13, 1990
Tom tries to juggle while he's being allured by Sugar Belle (voiced by Kath Soucie) while guarding a banquet table from Jerry.
6b	6b	"Super Duper Spike"	Pat Ventura	October 13, 1990
Tyke's favorite TV superhero unfortunately is sick, so his dad moonlights as his own son's beloved superhero.
6c	6c	"Mall Mouse"	Jim Ryan	October 13, 1990
At night, Tom is told by the owner to guard the cheese in a shop from Jerry, who happens to be hanging around the mall at night as a mysterious superhero known only as the Mall Mouse.
7a	7a	"Cosmic Chaos"	Pat Ventura	October 20, 1990
In a futuristic time, security guard Tom is ordered to eliminate Jerry at an apartment. In the end, Tom and Jerry are riding some futuristic motorcycles after being attacked by a gang of motorcyclists.
7b	7b	"Droopy of the Opera"	Pat Ventura	October 20, 1990
Droopy appears as a tenor of the opera, while a former opera star in other words Pepperoni McWolf plans to ruin his performance. Note: This episode is a parody of Phantom of the Opera.
7c	7c	"Beach Bummers"	Pat Ventura	October 20, 1990
At the beach, Jerry is being chased by Tom as he rescues a dolphin from some greedy fishermen.
8a	8a	"Gator, Baiter"	Pat Ventura	October 27, 1990
A wrestling gator (voiced by Jim Cummings) is fed up after being humiliated by other wrestlers that can break the rules, so he leaves his career and then encounters Tom and Jerry. Guest star: Sorrell Booke voices the wrestling announcer.
8b	8b	"Hoodwinked Cat"	Pat Ventura	October 27, 1990
In a homage to Little Red Riding Hood, Spike tells Tyke to deliver a canary to his grandmother, while Kyle attempts to steal and eats the bird.
8c	8c	"Medieval Mouse"	Sandy Fries	October 27, 1990
Squire Tom was told by his owner to clean the knight's castle and get rid of Jerry.
9a	9a	"Clyde to the Rescue"	Jim Ryan	November 3, 1990
Clyde gets his head stuck again when golfer Tom accidentally frees him again before he helps him catch Jerry, as he keeps running away from them and does not get captured by them.
9b	9b	"Droopio & Juliet"	Sandy Fries	November 3, 1990
Droopy and the narrator write a story about him competing against McWolf for a lovely woman named Juliet (Miss Vavoom).
9c	9c	"Maze Monster Zap Men"	Dennis Marks	November 3, 1990
During another chase, Tom and Jerry go into an arcade center after closing hours and the video game arcade monsters come to life and goes after Tom and Jerry in the arcade. Note: Most sound effects were from Donkey Kong for the Atari 2600 and also from Pac-Man for the Atari 2600.
10a	10a	"Crash Condor"	Jim Ryan	November 10, 1990
Tom tries to catch a baby condor in an attempt to cook and eat it after falling onto Tom's head before Jerry rescues and befriends the condor and helps him to fly back into the air.
10b	10b	"Yo Ho Ho... Bub"	Sandy Fries	November 10, 1990
Droopy, Dripple and McWolf are pirates competing to find some gold treasure and a beautiful female pirate Vavoom.
10c	10c	"Scrub-a-Dub Tom"	Pat Ventura	November 10, 1990
A little blonde Hyde-prone girl (voiced by Kath Soucie) bathes and dresses Tom to be in a pet show, despite Tom's objections.
11a	11a	"No Biz Like a Snow Biz"	Jim Ryan	November 17, 1990
Jerry and his mouse scouts are at a ski resort, while Tom enjoys skiing and interrupts them.
11b	11b	"The Maltese Poodle"	Sandy Fries	November 17, 1990
Detectives Droopy and Dripple are searching for the legendary Maltese Poodle statue after being informed by Miss Vavoom.
11c	11c	"Cast Away Tom"	Pat Ventura	November 17, 1990
Desperate for food, Tom sees an island and tries to find food and encounters a Tarzan-like Jerry on the island.
12a	12a	"The Little Urfulls"	Jim Ryan	November 24, 1990
Fearing that his planet will be doomed, Urfo entrusts Jerry to take care of 6 space pups and feed them some milk. Guest star: Peter Cullen voices the dogcatcher.
12b	12b	"Droopo: The First Bloodhound"	Jim Ryan	November 24, 1990
McWolf breaks out of prison and wears a sheriff's uniform before he tries to get his revenge against Droopy, who's spoofing Rambo in an attempt to arrest him.
12c	12c	"Indy Mouse 500"	Pat Ventura	November 24, 1990
A cross-country road race between fellow champions Tom and Jerry is on until Jerry wins the race. The title is a takeoff with the Indy 500 race at the Indianapolis Motor Speedway.
13a	13a	"Exterminator Cometh"	Jim Ryan	December 1, 1990
Calaboose Cal (voiced by Phil Hartman) is hired by Tom's owner who will replace Tom if he can't capture Jerry.
13b	13b	"Foreign Legion Frenzy"	Pat Ventura	December 1, 1990
Out in a desert, McWolf attacks Droopy and Dripple's castle.
13c	13c	"Urfo Returns"	Jim Ryan	December 1, 1990
Urfo flies away from home as he escapes. He rescues and defends Jerry from pursuing Tom; Meanwhile, a robotic catcher hires Tom as his reluctant assistant as both of them must work together to catch Urfo and get a huge money reward.

=== Season 2 (1991) ===
No. overall	No. in season	Title	Written by	Original release date
14a	1a	"Circus Antics"	Sandy Fries	September 14, 1991
Jerry tries to enjoy a day at the circus, but Tom is determined to catch him; an elephant hands Jerry a whistle so he can blow it whenever Tom comes around to cause trouble for Jerry.
14b	1b	"Trés Sheik Poodles"	Jim Ryan	September 14, 1991
Droopy, Dripple and McWolf compete in a competition to win Princess Vavoom's heart.
14c	1c	"Head Banger Buddy"	Patrick A. Ventura	September 14, 1991
During a chase, Tom accidentally hits a very large dog (voiced by Chuck McCann) on his head causing the dog to think he's like a cat. Later, the dog gets hit several times and changes from dog to cat behavior and vice versa.
15a	2a	"Pump 'Em Up Pals"	Fred Kron	September 21, 1991
Tom and Jerry are increasing their aerobics and fitness levels to use against each other.
15b	2b	"DroopyLand"	Patrick A. Ventura	September 21, 1991
Droopy and Dripple build a fictional amusement park called "DroopyLand" and enjoy being at the park, while McWolf attempts to destroy it by any means necessary.
15c	2c	"The Exterminator Cometh... Again"	Jim Ryan	September 21, 1991
Calaboose Cal takes Tom and Jerry to promote his businesses and inventions on national TV.
16a	3a	"Jerry's Mother"	Patrick A. Ventura	September 28, 1991
Jerry's mother (voiced by Sally Struthers) pays a visit to her son and helps him deal with Tom for stealing his food.
16b	3b	"Stage Fright"	Barry Blitzer	September 28, 1991
Droopy and Dripple rescue the singing Miss Lolly Vavoom from a runaway stagecoach as she organizes a race between Droopy and McWolf.
16c	3c	"Tom's Terror"	Jim Ryan	September 28, 1991
Tom moves over into a witch's house and eventually regrets his decision. Note: This episode is a remake of the 1956 Tom and Jerry short "The Flying Sorceress".
17a	4a	"Who Are You Kitten?"	Patrick A. Ventura	October 5, 1991
An orphaned kitten takes up residence at Tom's place, and is becoming a nuisance, not only to Tom, but to Jerry as well, until the orphan's mother drags him back home.
17b	4b	"Broadway Droopy"	Jim Ryan	October 5, 1991
Droopy and McWolf are entertainers competing for a musical role in a Broadway show in New York City until Droopy wins the role, while McWolf attempts to ruin his performance.
17c	4c	"Pussycat Pirate"	Dennis Marks	October 5, 1991
Tom and Jerry are pirates. The ship's captain (voiced by Jim Cummings) hires Tom to catch Jerry after his previous four cats ended up walking the plank for failing to catch the mouse.
18a	5a	"Father's Day"	Jim Ryan	October 12, 1991
Tom's grandfather (voiced by Hamilton Camp) comes to visit him as he takes him out to a desert to teach him survival skills.
18b	5b	"Scourge of the Sky"	Barry Blitzler, Don Jurwich, and Jerry Eisenberg	October 12, 1991
Droopy and Dripple are pilots during World War I as they face off against McWolf in an all-out dogfight in the air.
18c	5c	"Lightning Bolt the Super Squirrel"	Patrick A. Ventura	October 12, 1991
Lightning Bolt the Super Squirrel helps defend the weak against the strong, as he decides to help Jerry against Tom while he also helps Tom take on a dog. In the end, he gives them some superhero costumes as the two decide to put their superhero skills to the test.
19a	6a	"Amademouse"	Jim Ryan	October 19, 1991
Tom and Jerry are musicians playing pianos for the king.
19b	6b	"Muscle Beach Droopy"	Jim Ryan	October 19, 1991
Droopy and Dripple drive down to the beach and the women are attracted to Droopy, while Hunk Hardbody is not too happy about Droopy getting all the attention from the ladies themselves.
19c	6c	""Perky" the Fish Pinching Penguin"	Dennis Marks	October 19, 1991
A penguin named Perky escapes at night to find some fish to eat. The next day, Tom's down by the docks in a fishing boat using Jerry as bait before Perky decides to help him and get rid of Tom.
20a	7a	"Slowpoke Antonio"	Patrick A. Ventura	October 26, 1991
Jerry's cowboy cousin, Slowpoke Antonio, comes to the neighborhood to get some last minute rodeo training by pursuing Tom.
20b	7b	"Haunted Droopy"	Jim Ryan	October 26, 1991
Droopy and Dripple go to the home of Droopy's late twin brother, Droopert for the reading of his will, while McWolf tries to scare them at any cost.
20c	7c	"Wildmouse"	Fred Kron	October 26, 1991
Wildmouse is a mouse raised by wolves that can eat everything in its path very quickly, as Tom's owner Pierre (voiced by René Auberjonois) tells him to catch Wildmouse for stealing all of his food. Note: First appearance of Wildmouse.
21a	8a	"Catch That Mouse"	Jim Ryan	November 2, 1991
Calaboose Cal and Miss Lolly Vavoom run the game show titled "Catch That Mouse" where the cats are each given special objectives to catch a mouse and win up to a million dollars. Before the show begins, a brown cat named Ferdie Furball once again attempts to catch Jerry, but fails. Then Vavoom calls Tom to appear on the show and is given multiple ways to catch Jerry during the show, but with only a limited amount of time. During Tom's fourth and final attempt, he chases Jerry (who was willing to take a dive) as he is finally captured by Tom as they reach the goal line as Miss Vavoom proudly awards Tom and Jerry a brand new car as the three drive off into the night, while Calaboose Cal closes out the show for the night.
21b	8b	"Good Knight Droopy"	Patrick A. Ventura	November 2, 1991
Knights Droopy and Butch (voiced by Brad Garrett) are battling each other in a jousting tournament in order to win Miss Vavoom's heart.
21c	8c	"Birthday Surprise"	Sandy Fries	November 2, 1991
Tom brings birthday presents to his neighbor Cindy Lou, who's celebrating her birthday and apparently, he has a crush on her. As he comes to bring the final present, Jerry is dressed up as a ballerina in a fake music box, but Tom finally finds out that Cindy Lou is already in love with another cat as she starts going out with him instead as Tom just cannot believe that she chose another boyfriend who happens to be better than Tom could have ever been.
22a	9a	"Cleocatra"	Fred Kron	November 9, 1991
Cleocatra (voiced by Tress MacNeille) orders Tothentamon (Tom) to catch The Desert Shadow (Jerry) for stealing all her food. Note: The title character is a parody of Cleopatra.
22b	9b	"McWolfenstein"	Jim Ryan	November 9, 1991
Mad scientist McWolf creates Frankenstein's monster, who complains a lot. When Dr. Droopy wins an award for the "World's Greatest Scientist," McWolf gets steamed up and sends his monster to go after him.
22c	9c	"Chase School"	Sandy Fries	November 9, 1991
The boys are at the chase school when a teacher (voiced by Greg Burson) demonstrates how two teams of cats and mice can work together as Tom goes after Jerry all the while Jerry attempts to evade or foil Tom's plans. However, both sides have a debate about which species happens to be the best, which means If Jerry fails to work together with his classmate and teammate Tom, then one of the teams will win. In the end, both sides agree to settle things by having an all out pie fight as they hurl pies at each other.
23a	10a	"Zorrito"	Jim Ryan	November 16, 1991
In Spain, swashbuckler hero Jerry as Zorrito tries to stop Tom from stealing all the citizens money as Tom happens to be following orders from his leader the village's greedy king.
23b	10b	"Deep Sleep Droopy"	Sandy Fries	November 16, 1991
Droopy and Dripple are bodyguards protecting Miss Vavoom as they try to protect her from The Chubby Man (McWolf).
23c	10c	"Hard to Swallow"	Patrick A. Ventura	November 16, 1991
A swallow bird named Bernie (voiced by David Lander) flies from South America to North America until he is tired and falls from the sky, which causes the right side of his wing to end up being damaged when he falls onto Tom's plate as he wants to eat him, but Jerry saves Bernie.
24a	11a	"The Little Thinker"	Jim Ryan	November 23, 1991
A little boy named Buzz finds a space dog named Urfo when he's hiding from another alien named Big Feet.
24b	11b	"Rap Rat is Where It's At"	Jim Ryan	November 23, 1991
A hip hop rat named Rap Rat is stealing things around the city while rapping until police officers Droopy and Dripple nab him and send him off to jail.
24c	11c	"My Pet"	Jim Ryan	November 23, 1991
Tyke would like to have a cat for a pet but he finds an Indian Bengal tiger escaped from a circus train. In the end, Tyke and Spike help him go back to his homeland of India. Note: This is one of the two episodes of the show to only have various cartoons and no Tom and Jerry Kids cartoons.
25a	12a	"Calaboose Cal 495"	Jim Ryan	November 30, 1991
Tom and Jerry are competing in a racing event hosted by Calaboose Cal and Miss Vavoom as both want to win a million-dollar prize. In the end, they both finish the race at the same time and both of them win the prize much to their shock and awe along with everyone else as well.
25b	12b	"Return of the Chubby Man"	Sandy Fries	November 30, 1991
Miss Vooey Vavoom and detectives Droopy and Dripple are on a mission to stop the Chubby Man (McWolf) from stealing her beloved jade poodle.
25c	12c	"Chumpy Chums"	Sandy Fries	November 30, 1991
Spike tries to convince Tom and Jerry to become good friends in order to show his son Tyke what brotherly love is all about, but Tom keeps disrespecting Jerry, and the tables turn when Tyke says that dogs and cats can be friends as he wants his father to be a better neighbor and Tom's friend.
26a	13a	"Jerry Hood and His Merry Meeces"	Fred Kron	December 7, 1991
The Sheriff wants to arrest Jerry Hood (Jerry) and his Merry Meeces for committing multiple crimes as he sends Tom to capture them. But in the end, when he escapes from the Sheriff's castle, Tom becomes Jerry Hood's ally. Note: The title character is a parody of Robin Hood. Guest Star Tony Jay as the narrator.
26b	13b	"Eradicator Droopy"	Patrick A. Ventura	December 7, 1991
Private detectives Droopy and Dripple and Miss Vavoom attempt to stop Mad scientist McWolf along with his latest invention, The Eradicator from wreaking havoc upon the entire city.
26c	13c	"Tyke on a Hike"	Patrick A. Ventura	December 7, 1991
Tyke goes off to the jungle with his father Spike to take some photos of animals, but a lion takes Tyke's food as Spike dislikes him. In the end, Spike and Tyke return home whereas the lion happens to be there while eating, drinking and watching some television and would like to be around Spike and Tyke even though Spike dislikes the idea.

=== Season 3 (1992) ===
This is the only season to have 26 episodes instead of 13, with 2 episodes airing on Saturday and Sunday, making it the longest season in the show.

No. overall	No. in season	Title	Written by	Original release date
27a	1a	"The Planet Dogmania"	Sandy Fries	September 12, 1992
After eating pizza, Tom has a bad nightmare where scary cats tell him if he can't catch Jerry within the next hour, he will be sent off to the Planet Dogmania.
27b	1b	"McWolfula"	Jim Ryan	September 12, 1992
McWolf appears as a vampire and tries to bite Droopy and Dripple who sleep in his castle.
27c	1c	"Catawumpus Cat"	Sandy Fries	September 12, 1992
Tom is sent by the Native American cats to catch Wild Mouse. But in the end, the Native Americans get angry for failing to catch Wild Mouse before they force Tom to live with the wild animals, including Wild Mouse.
28a	2a	"Pest in the West"	Patrick A. Ventura	September 19, 1992
Jerry's cousin, Slowpoke, annoys Tom by eating his food before he pursues them.
28b	2b	"Double 'O' Droopy"	Jim Ryan	September 19, 1992
Droopy and Dripple are spy agents and their mission is to stop McWolf's plans. Note: The title character is a parody of James Bond, AKA 007.
28c	2c	"Tom, the Babysitter"	Arthur Alsberg and Don Nelson	September 19, 1992
A teenage girl (voiced by Kath Soucie) was instructed babysit a young child while her mother (also voiced by Kath Soucie) was going out after Tom promised not to bother the child. However, the babysitter is talking on the phone than doing her actual babysitting, while Tom points to her that the child has crawled out of his crib and was crawling everywhere around the house until the babysitter accuses Tom for taking the child out of the crib and kicks him out of the house. Then Tom gets back inside and works together with Jerry to get the child back into his crib shortly before the child's mother returns home. Note: This episode is a remake of both the 1956 and 1958 Tom and Jerry shorts Busy Buddies and Tot Watchers.
29a	3a	"Gas Blaster Puss"	Patrick A. Ventura	September 26, 1992
Jerry builds a special motorcycle made specifically for mice, while Tom uses various heavy artillery to attack him but fails.
29b	3b	"Fear of Flying"	Arthur Alsberg and Don Nelson	September 26, 1992
Dr. Droopy and Dripple teach McWolf on how to face his fear of flying after being delayed at an airport during his vacation to Hawaii with Miss Vavoom.
29c	3c	"Mess Hall Mouser"	Sandy Fries	September 26, 1992
Tom and Jerry are serving with the US army at a training base. The army's chef orders Tom to catch Jerry for stealing his food, but every time when Tom catches Jerry, a mysterious female soldier cat comes to help Jerry.
30a	4a	"Toliver's Twist"	Barry Blitzer	September 27, 1992
A poor and hungry mouse goes into Tom and Jerry's house to tell them about him and his fellow mice orphans that happen to be suffering, so they welcome them in their house. Note: The title is a parody of Oliver Twist.
30b	4b	"Boomer Beaver"	Patrick A. Ventura	September 27, 1992
A beaver (voiced by Jesse Corti) discovers that his house was completely destroyed by Spike when he's cutting all of the abundant-tree filled forest to build his own house before he convinces him not to destroy his house.
30c	4c	"Pony Express Droopy"	Bruce Morris	September 27, 1992
Droopy, Dripple and McWolf compete in a pony express race until Droopy and Dripple win the race.
31a	5a	"Krazy Klaws"	Barry Blitzer	October 3, 1992
Tom wants to be part of a motorcycle cat gang before they send him after Jerry.
31b	5b	"Tyke on a Bike"	Bruce Morris	October 3, 1992
Tyke wins a bike courtesy of a sweepstakes event while he's watching television as it was advertising a commercial featuring a motorcycle like bike called the super cycle that comes complete with an autograph picture and asks his father Spike to teach him how to ride a bike, but Spike can't ride himself since he was young before he tells his son he'll help him learn how to ride a motorcycle like a bicycle at an obstacle course.
31c	5c	"Tarmutt of the Apes"	Jim Ryan	October 3, 1992
McWolf is searching for and tries to catch a gorilla in order to get a million-dollar reward, but Droopy and Dripple save the gorilla.
32a	6a	"Tom's Mermouse Mess-Up"	Patrick A. Ventura	October 4, 1992
During Tom's fishing outing, Jerry finds a beautiful mermaid mouse after being attacked by a sea creature. He spends some time with his love interest, a beautiful mermouse, until Tom catches her in an attempt to sell the mermouse to an aquarium before Jerry manages to help the mermouse escape.
32b	6b	"Here's Sand in Your Face"	Arthur Alsberg and Don Nelson	October 4, 1992
Tyke has a conflict with a man (voiced by Maurice LaMarche) at the beach when he accidentally trips himself causing his beach ball to bounce into him before Spike intervenes as he's sent flying into the sea. For Spike's last attempt, he uses some special moves he learned in order to toughen himself up as he uses a combination of ballet dancing and martial arts.
32c	6c	"Deep Space Droopy"	Stewart St. John	October 4, 1992
In space, Droopy and Dripple are protecting Princess Vavoom's medallion from McWolf who attempts to steal it from her.
33a	7a	"Termi-Maid"	Carl Swenson	October 10, 1992
A robot named Termi-Maid comes into Tom and Jerry's house to clean their house, but the robot becomes a threat to Tom and Jerry before they work together to stop her at all costs.
33b	7b	"The Fish That Shoulda Got Away"	Arthur Alsberg and Don Nelson	October 10, 1992
Spike and Tyke go fishing and try to catch various kinds of fish. In the end, Tyke tells Spike that he found a fish: a beautiful mermaid.
33c	7c	"Droopy's Rhino"	Patrick A. Ventura	October 10, 1992
In Africa, McWolf tries to catch a rare white rhino for a huge money reward, but Droopy and Dripple save the rhino. In the end, Droopy and Dripple get their reward courtesy of the circus's ringmaster for catching McWolf because he's a rare wolf.
34a	8a	"The Break 'n' Entry Boyz"	Barry Blitzer	October 11, 1992
Two notorious dog bandits sneak into Tom and Jerry's house to steal their things, but they tie Tom up. Jerry unties him and teams up to get them until Jerry calls the police to get the bandits themselves.
34b	8b	"Love Me, Love My Zebra"	Arthur Alsberg and Don Nelson	October 11, 1992
Tyke is hiding a zebra in his room after hearing about a news report after he escapes from the zoo and promises him to take back to his homeland. When the zoo catcher is coming, Tyke and the zebra run away as they're being chased by a zoo truck before they inadvertently enter the Scarborough Hill Race Track's horse race event as they race against their competition and win the race. He gets the money prize for winning the competition as the zebra returns to its homeland as Spike and Tyke see their zebra friend off.
34c	8c	"Dakota Droopy Returns"	Patrick A. Ventura	October 11, 1992
Droopy and Dripple travel through the Amazon jungle to find a lost beautiful young princess in order to get a reward, while McWolf is also trying to find the lost princess, but becomes side-tracked by a local tribe. When they find her, they discover she was already being rescued by Droopy and Dripple's grandfather as well as being married to him. Droopy and Dripple are happy for him and let him be alone with his beautiful new bride.
35a	9a	"Doom Manor"	Stewart St. John	October 17, 1992
During a chase, Tom and Jerry run into a creepy manor house and encounter a witch (voiced by June Foray), who truly loves cats and uses Jerry as an experiment. In the end, Frankenstein's monster catches up to them after he ruins her laboratory and escapes from the manor, as he tries to befriend Tom and Jerry.
35b	9b	"Barbecue Bust-Up"	Patrick A. Ventura	October 17, 1992
Tyrone interrupts Spike and Tyke's barbecue as Spike won't allow any cats to eat his steak. For Tyrone's last attempt, the steak is completely ruined after he accidentally fires a group of rockets toward the barbecue grill, causing it to explode as he has an idea in other words he invites over to the cats' neighborhood for a special steak barbecue event. Note: This episode is a similar to the 1956 Tom and Jerry short "Barbecue Brawl".
35c	9c	"The Fabulous Droopy & Dripple"	Stewart St. John	October 17, 1992
Droopy and Dripple are hired by new singer Miss Vavoom at their club, while McWolf attempts to eliminate them and get into the show. But in the end after his many failed attempts, McWolf has had enough and tells them he wants to become the star of their own act. Note: This episode is a parody of "The Fabulous Baker Boys".
36a	10a	"S.O.S. Ninja"	Stewart St. John	October 18, 1992
After Tom kicks Jerry out of the house yet again, a sales mouse gives Jerry a special kind of belt that can summon ninjas in order to keep Tom from bothering him as they give him all sorts of protection.
36b	10b	"The Pink Powder Puff Racer"	Stewart St. John	October 18, 1992
Spike (who happens to be a former soapbox racing champion when he was younger) helps Tyke build and design his own car for the annual neighborhood soapbox race.
36c	10c	"Car Wash Droopy"	Stewart St. John	October 18, 1992
Droopy and Dripple make a lot of money at their car wash, while McWolf tries to get the people to come to his car wash.
37a	11a	"Go-pher Help"	Arthur Alsberg and Don Nelson	October 24, 1992
At a golf course, a gopher notices Tom's chasing and mistreating Jerry by using him as a golf ball before he saves him as they team up in order to get back at Tom.
37b	11b	"Downhill Droopy"	Stewart St. John	October 24, 1992
At a ski resort somewhere in Europe, world-famous skiers Droopy and Dripple give Miss Vavoom skiing lessons, while Matterhorn McWolf is furious when they give ski lessons to her instead of him.
37c	11c	"Down in the Dumps"	Bruce Morris	October 24, 1992
Tyke accepts his sleepy father's assignment in order to protect the city dump from multiple scavengers which also includes Kyle (the third appearance of the character).
38a	12a	"Catastrophe Cat"	Stewart St. John	October 25, 1992
Tom's country cousin, Catastrophe Cat, who can cause all sorts of disasters while singing and walking around, visits Tom and Jerry before he helps him catch Jerry as mayhem itself ensues.
38b	12b	"Droopy and the Dragon"	Arthur Alsberg and Don Nelson	October 25, 1992
After a magic show, fire inspectors Droopy and Dripple rescue McWolf's dragon by taking him back to his homeland by using a time machine as Droopy says they'll have a very happy ending.
38c	12c	"Wild Mouse II"	Stewart St. John	October 25, 1992
Sheriff Potgut hires the Gator Brothers to stop Wild Mouse from stealing his favourite soup while riding a speed boat.
39a	13a	"Tom's Double Trouble"	Arthur Alsberg and Don Nelson	October 31, 1992
Tom's owner gets him a birthday present for him which happens to be a white mouse named Percy (voiced by Susan Blu), but he gets into trouble because of him until Percy manages to fight back then runs away and hides in Jerry's mousehole before he paints Jerry white in order to confuse Tom. In the end, Tom was so sad about Percy accidentally ending up in a sewer drain before he paints Jerry white when Tom's owner returns and surprisingly, Percy is still alive before he goes back into his cage as they bid each other goodbye, but Tom goes back to his usual ways as their chase resumes.
39b	13b	"High Seas Hijinks"	Carl Swenson	October 31, 1992
The queen tells Droopy Columbus and Dripple along with their rival, Admiral McWolf, to set sail in order to find the new world and whoever gets there first will be rewarded.
39c	13c	"Just Rambling Along"	Patrick A. Ventura	October 31, 1992
In Madrid, Spain, Slowpoke happens to be a toreador at the Chili Bean Arena.
40a	14a	"The Watchcat"	Stewart St. John	November 1, 1992
Tom is employed at the Museum of Natural History under the title of "watchcat" and his working under the human manager when Jerry was trespassing and sneaks into the museum. During the chase, the six objects comes to life at night and walk their exhibits to haunt them until the clock reaches 6:00 am before the objects back into their exhibits when the manager returns, but the museum manager is revealed that he was disguised as a brown wolf before scaring away at the museum.
40b	14b	"Go with the Floe"	Sandy Fries	November 1, 1992
Droopy and Dripple compete with Muckluck McWolf in a dog-sled race to the North Pole to win a million-dollar prize and kiss Miss Frosty Vavoom.
40c	14c	"Pooches in Peril"	Sandy Fries	November 1, 1992
Mounties Droopy and Dripple are assigned to capture the dangerous tree logger Slalom McWolf.
41a	15a	"Catch as Cat Can"	Barry Blitzer	November 7, 1992
Tom and Jerry are being chased by a game hunter on an island after they accidentally get in a hot-air balloon from a circus during their chase.
41b	15b	"I Dream of Cheezy"	Bruce Morris	November 7, 1992
While chasing Jerry, Tom goes to Sergeant Boffo's ferocious feline mouse-bashing school for training to toughen up with his attitude for catching mice. When Tom catches Jerry and throws him away from the house, he finds a mysterious bottle at the city dump to release the mouse genie named Cheezy (voiced by Chuck McCann) and befriends Jerry and helps him to attack Tom for doing so. Note: This episode is similar to I Dream of Jeannie.
41c	15c	"Fraidy Cat"	Don Nelson and Arthur Alsberg	November 7, 1992
A cat named Tim (voiced by Dana Hill and the character is similar to Jerry's twin-brother Percy in the previous title "Tom's Double Trouble") arrives at the front door and Tom welcomes in. Tim tells Tom (whom he refers to be a "twin brother" due to their similar appearances) with his memories when he was a timid cat and what was called the "Fraidy Cat", and a states that he's not anymore. During Tim's stay, he turns out to be still frightened of mice and pilfers food at the refrigerator until Tom gets caught with Jerry. In the end, Tom scares him away by disguising himself as a gigantic robot mouse by tricking him into believing Jerry was actually turned into the monster and scares him away from the house. Note: This episode is a remake of the 1957 Tom and Jerry short Timid Tabby and this is the only episode to have three Tom and Jerry Kids cartoons and no various cartoons
42a	16a	"Sing Along with Slowpoke"	Patrick A. Ventura	November 8, 1992
Jerry's cousin, Slowpoke, visits his house again to sing along with his guitar for the upcoming star TV show on tomorrow night, but his terrible singing annoys Tom and Tom keeps trying to get rid of Slowpoke.
42b	16b	"Dakota Droopy and the Great Train Robbery"	Arthur Alsberg and Don Nelson	November 8, 1992
Dakota Droopy and Dripple are on a mission to guard a train from the most infamous gold robbery Gold Wolf which is carrying a billion dollars in gold bullion.
42c	16c	"Droopy Law"	Bruce Morris	November 8, 1992
High Court Judge Droopy holds McWolf in disguised as a woman and Dripple with the public defender Miss Vavoom in court, Dripple tells her about accuses McWolf who's stealing the cookies while delivering to his grandmother (same as similar to the previous season 1 title "Hoodwinked Cat" when Kyle attempts to steal and eats the bird while delivering Tyke is being guarded by Spike).
43a	17a	"Stunt Cat"	Barry Blitzer	November 14, 1992
Movie stunt cat Tom are making the movie titled "Dancing with Dingbats" (a take-off with Dances with Wolves) alongside Kevin Castner (a take-off with Kevin Costner) and Wild Mouse.
43b	17b	"See No Evil"	Sandy Fries	November 14, 1992
During a usual chase, Jerry discovers some invisible ink at a table, and he changes himself into being invisible so he can mess with Tom. And later, Tom also uses the invisible ink to do the same to Jerry. In the end, both of them are using the invisible ink to a chase that never stops around the destruction of the house. Note: This episode is similar to the 1947 Tom and Jerry short "The Invisible Mouse".
43c	17c	"This Is No Picnic"	Arthur Alsberg and Don Nelson	November 14, 1992
Spike and Tyke are on an outing for a picnic, while an army of ants attempts to steal their father and son picnic food.
44a	18a	"Scrapheap Symphony"	Jim Ryan	November 15, 1992
The first crossover episode featuring the cast: Clyde, Calaboose Cal, Kyle, Miss Vavoom, Spike & Tyke, Droopy & Dripple, Slowpoke Antonio and Wildmouse are playing "William Tell Overture" with McWolf as the conductor. Note: This is the first and only episode where all the characters are in one cartoon.
44b	18b	"Circus Cat"	Barry Blitzer	November 15, 1992
During a chase around a circus, Tom digs into a lion's cage and he pulls him away. The lion named Simba, the King of the Beast, befriends and helps to protect Jerry from Tom bothering him. In the end before the show begins, Tom will become his new assistant to jump through the ring of fire 200 times for the world record attempt.
44c	18c	"Cajun Gumbo"	Stewart St. John	November 15, 1992
Swampy Fox escapes from a circus train and goes back to the swamp to locate the treasure, while Sheriff Potgut and the Gator Brothers (a previous appearance in the episode title "Wild Mouse II") wants the treasure as well.
45a	19a	"Hunter Pierre"	Stewart St. John	November 21, 1992
A wealthy animal collector tells Hunter Pierre to capture Wild Mouse at the old ghost town for a million-dollar reward, but fails attempts to catch him.
45b	19b	"Battered Up!"	Bruce Morris	November 21, 1992
Molasses Droopy and Thunderbolt McWolf are the baseball players to compete against each other in the baseball competition match with Miss Vavoom as umpire and Dripple as a pitcher until McWolf wins the game will be promoted to the major leagues and introduce Droopy as a new coach, but McWolf scares him away and leaves the field, begging him to win the entire match.
45c	19c	"The Conquest of the Planet Irwin"	Sandy Fries	November 21, 1992
In the year 2500 AD, Commandeer Droopy, Lieutenant Dripple and the crew member Rocket-Breath McWolf were on board the spaceship struggling to maintain control of the ship as they crash-landed onto the planet Irwin before he sends them into the palace to meet the Queen Vavoom and tells them about the contest; the winner will become the king and rule of the planet by her side if he captures the rare of zupp creature. Note this is the second and last episode to only have various cartoons and no Tom and Jerry Kids cartoons.
46a	20a	"Big Top Droopy"	Patrick A. Ventura	November 22, 1992
Droopy and Dripple are the new daredevil superstar attractions at the Colonel Buckshot's Circus, while Bromo the Fearless Bear attempts to outperform without them.
46b	20b	"Jerry and the Beanstalk"	Barry Blitzer	November 22, 1992
When Jerry is stealing food, Tom's owner tells him can't eat dinner if he captures Jerry and then gives him the 3 beans on the bowl before he throws the beans out which will turn into a beanstalk. Tom and Jerry climb the beanstalk up into the sky and enter a castle to find the golden egg when is being chased by the angry giant before they managed to escape by cutting down the beanstalk to "timber." The giant falls down into the ground and Tom and Jerry return and gives the owner back the golden egg until the giant drops by to want it back. Note: This episode is a parody of "Jack and the Beanstalk".
46c	20c	"High Speed Hounds"	Sandy Fries	November 22, 1992
Droopy and McWolf with Dripple races against each other in a footrace on The Big Apple Marathon Race, the winner will be rewarded to have a dinner date with Miss High-Rise Vavoom.
47a	21a	"Penthouse Mouse"	Jim Ryan	November 28, 1992
Calaboose Cal and Tom are hired by a penthouse owner to get rid of Jerry during the grand opening of Manhattan's most luxurious apartments. Note: This episode is similar to the 1963 Tom and Jerry short of the same title.
47b	21b	"Twelve Angry Sheep"	Bruce Morris	November 28, 1992
Judge Droopy holds the case against Scoundrel McWolf in the courthouse who's accused of stealing the sheep from the loyal sheepdog Dripple and Little Miss Bo Peep Vavoom until Dripple was confessed that he's pleaded guilty to wrongdoings before he sentenced him to 13 days in prison. Note: This episode is similar to the previous episode title "The Droopy Law" and a parody of "Twelve Angry Men".
47c	21c	"The Ant Attack"	Stewart St. John	November 28, 1992
Tom's owner bakes a cake for Tom to celebrate his 7th birthday to blow all the candles until Jerry blows one candle to eat his cake and then runs away, but Jerry runs down to the closed door and Tom jumps onto the wooden plank, causing Jerry to fly into the tree and fall onto the ground before was rescued by the army of red ants (a previous appearances with the Spike & Tyke episode title "This Is No Picnic") and they plans to crash Tom's birthday celebration to cut the cake into a various pieces. When his owner returns home, she realises Tom was eating already with his birthday cake and promises to bake another one next year, much to Tom's confusion, sadly and sitting in the kitchen until the ants finally give back to him the pieces of the cake to apologise and carry the letters to said "Happy Birthday Tom" to enjoy his birthday cake in tears with the celebration. Note: The seven candles of the birthday cake reveal Tom to be around 6-7 years old.
48a	22a	"Mouse with a Message"	Sandy Fries	November 29, 1992
In the WWI era, The Currier (Jerry) was sent by the general to deliver the letter to HQ, while Thomas Von Klobberhafen (the German name is Tom) was determined to acquire the letter.
48b	22b	"It's the Mad, Mad, Mad, Mad, Dr. McWolf"	Jim Ryan	November 29, 1992
The mad scientist Dr. McWolf tries to make himself handsome with his experiment after he sees the commercial of Dr. Droopy's product with the instant best-selling beauty market.
48c	22c	"Wild World of Bowling"	Bruce Morris	November 29, 1992
Wild Mouse escapes from a museum truck from a safe and enters the urban bowling alley where Tom is working at after a smoke direction from Tom's pizza sends him there. Tom tries to get rid of him until Wild Mouse steals a bowling ball and leaves the town when the police arrive. In the end, Wild Mouse is playing with the bowling ball with his friends in the wildlife forest.
49a	23a	"Star Wrek"	Barry Blitzer	December 5, 1992
This episode title is about Tom and Jerry starring in a battle between the mice and the Bulgarian feline cat enemies across the galaxy in a spoof of Star Trek.
49b	23b	"Droop and Deliver"	Bruce Morris	December 5, 1992
In Colonial times, Droopy and Dripple are on the hazardous mission to drive with an armored coach, full of The King's currency to a dangerous country. In their path, they encounter The Ungentlemanly Bandit: Uncouth McWolf, who is wanted for robbery, diliging and rude manners.
49c	23c	"Swallow the Swallow"	Patrick A. Ventura	December 5, 1992
Hungry cats Kyle and Clyde attempt to eat Bernie (a previous appearance on the episode title "Hard to Swallow") after he's tired and falls onto the farm.
50a	24a	"Lightning Bolt – The Super Squirrel Strikes Again"	Patrick A. Ventura	December 6, 1992
In a sequel to the previous season 2 title, Tom was playing tennis using Jerry as a tennis ball after the chase before the Lightning Bolt shots him and rescues Jerry to attack Tom when he accidentally hits the tennis net before the chase resumes, but Fido starts chasing Tom when the Lightning Bolt saves him.
50b	24b	"Surely You Joust"	Sandy Fries	December 6, 1992
Unemployed Droopy and Dripple look for a job before they meet the King, who hires them to go out and must slay a dragon named Dwayne (voiced by Jim Cummings) who is wreaking havoc in his kingdom.
50c	24c	"Rootin' Tootin' Slowpoke"	Patrick A. Ventura	December 6, 1992
Slowpoke goes to the Gower Gulch to showdown against Flashipus, a desperado cat who's always trying to get rid all of the mice around his town.
51a	25a	"Firehouse Mouse"	Barry Blitzer	December 12, 1992
The firehouse dog named Sparky returns to his duty from his retirement with the help of Tom and Jerry after Tom's accidentally spilled the cooking oil and the electric wire during the chase, causing turns onto the fire to blaze and trapping them inside the kitchen.
51b	25b	"The Wrath of Dark Wolf"	Stewart St. John	December 12, 1992
While taking the day off, Galactic cosmic heroes Captain Droopy and Junior Captain Dripple find the Dark Wolf who is planning to take over their planet and build his own empire.
51c	25c	"Pound Hound"	Bruce Morris	December 12, 1992
When Kyle steals from a hot dog vendor, he runs away and unknowingly enters a dog pound truck and is cuffed to a tough dog named Bazooka who hates cats. They escape the truck and goes on the run with a French dog inspector tracking them down.
52a	26a	"The Ghost of Castle McLochjaw"	Bruce Morris	December 13, 1992
On a dark and stormy night, Tom and Jerry run off into a castle where they encounter a ghost dog coming back to life after 200 years of imprisonment before he befriends him and helps to protect Jerry from bothering Tom.
52b	26b	"A Thousand Clones"	Bruce Morris	December 13, 1992
In 2029 AD in Los Angeles, detectives Droopy and Dripple helps Dr. Ultra Vavoom (who is blue and has a different hairstyle) against Dr. Dupo McWolf who's stolen her duplicate machine and duplicates himself to create robotic enemies. Note: This episode is a parody of the Terminator series.
52c	26c	"Roughing It"	Jim Ryan	December 13, 1992
In a wildlife forest, the mouse scouts have a plan to rough it with their scout leader and he teaches them a lesson to make men out of them.

=== Season 4 (1993) ===
Some of the episodes were produced in 1992.

No. overall	No. in season	Title	Written by	Original release date
53a	1a	"As the Cheese Turns"	Janice Diamond	September 11, 1993
Tom was watching his favorite daytime soap opera Nine Lives to Live, while Jerry tunes his favorite daytime soap opera As the Cheese Turns it's about trying to befriend an adolescent girl mouse after Tom's crash onto the swimming pool during the chase is being interrupted by the macho mouse before they decides to make the competition.
53b	1b	"McWerewolf of London"	Jim Ryan	September 11, 1993
Using Big Ben as a hideout, Sir Trevor McWolf uses a formula that transforms him into his criminal werewolf form called McWerewolf. In this form, McWerewolf is going around in London causing havoc in the entire city before he robbed some cash in the bank, the Inspector Droople and the Sergeant Dripple were on the case to stop him for attempted robbery. Note: This episode is similar to the 1935 horror film Werewolf of London. In addition, Sir Trevor McWolf's transformation into McWerewolf through a formula is similar to the transformations seen in Strange Case of Dr Jekyll and Mr Hyde.
53c	1c	"Grab That Bird"	Patrick A. Ventura	September 11, 1993
In this sequel to the season 3 title "Swallow the Swallow", castaways Kyle and Clyde are desperate for food when they encounter Bernie on top of the coconut tree during his vacation before attempting to catch and eats the bird but fails. In the end, when Bernie leaves the island to go on board the cruise ship, the giant monster appears and chases them around the island.
54a	2a	"Cave Mouse"	Stewart St. John	September 18, 1993
When a professor tells about the prehistoric times in a university, the cave cat Tom pursues the cave mouse Jerry.
54b	2b	"McWolfenstein Returns"	Jim Ryan	September 18, 1993
In a sequel to the season 2 title, the mad scientist McWolfenstein gets him out of the castle for failure to do so before he meets Droopy, who's spoofing as Alfred Hitchcock, makes him star on his new monster-thriller movie titled "Saturday the 14th" (a take-off of the slasher horror film "Friday the 13th"). When McWolf spots them on television, he tries to stop them and bring his monster back for making the film.
54c	2c	"Destructive Construction"	Patrick A. Ventura	September 18, 1993
Blast-Off Buzzard pursues Crazy Legs Snake at a construction site in attempts to eat him, but fails.
55a	3a	"Alien Mouse"	Bruce Morris	September 25, 1993
Captain entrusts Tom to stop Wild Mouse from swallowing and destroying their spaceship. Note: This episode is similar to the 1975 The Tom and Jerry Show episode title "Termites Plus Two".
55b	3b	"Droopy Man"	Stewart St. John	September 25, 1993
In a city of darkness known as Gossip City, millionaires and superheroes Droopy Man and Dripple Boy teams up with Cheetah Vavoom to stop a greedy pig named Piligos P. Snorthog for stealing their foods around the city. Note: The title character is a parody of Batman.
55c	3c	"Abusement Park"	Patrick A. Ventura	September 25, 1993
In a sequel from the previous episode title "Destructive Construction", Blast-Off Buzzard and his gang of buzzards go after Crazy Legs Snake; they enter The Desert Oasis Amusement Park where Crazy Legs happens to be there and fooling around them and the chase resumes by using various amusement rides.
56a	4a	"Martian Mouse"	Stewart St. John	October 2, 1993
The Martian Mouse that was on board the ship was breaking up due to malfunction, so he makes an emergency landing on planet Earth and meets Jerry after Tom gets him out of the house for playing drums while sleeping. While he makes a teleporting back to his planet after tells him to take care of his spaceship, Jerry flies around until Tom accidentally swallows it.
56b	4b	"Darkwolf Strikes Back"	Stewart St. John	October 2, 1993
In a sequel to the season 3 title "The Wrath of Dark Wolf" after they captured Dark Wolf and teleported him to the Planet "Hoodnik," Captain Droopy and Junior Captain Dripple was sent out to find the priceless abadon energy ball and bring them back to Starleash Headquarters who has stolen by the galactic bandence and separated into two pieces were hidden by other planets when Dark Wolf returns to the action and attempts to steal their pieces too.
56c	4c	"Knockout Pig"	Patrick A. Ventura	October 2, 1993
In McDoogles pig farm, the boxing pig escapes the barn at night from being pursuit by the police when he thinks he's going to be shipped to the meat market after they informed him by his fellow pigs before he heads to the suburbs where he meets Jerry for help, while Tom also foils an attempt to sell the pigs for a big money reward when he's informed by watching television before Jerry stops him by using the bell to beats him out.
57a	5a	"Musketeer Jr."	Patrick A. Ventura	October 9, 1993
Musketeer Jerry teaches Tuffy how to be a musketeer in his fencing school and fight against the musketeer Tom for getting rid of them when Tuffy exclaims "Touché, Pussy Cat!" and pokes Tom's rear-end four times in the process. Note: This episode is a similar to the 1954 Tom and Jerry short "Touché, Pussy Cat!".
57b	5b	"Galaxy Droopy"	Patrick A. Ventura	October 9, 1993
Dark Wolf's invention with the new Super Sucksaforus vacuum can inhale all and suck out their planets before he tries to steal a bunch of lottery tickets at the convenience store, Captain Droopy and Junior Captain Dripple were on the mission to stop him from his evil plans.
57c	5c	"Return of the Ants"	Stewart St. John	October 9, 1993
Spike and Tyke were on the beach for fun where suddenly the red ants who lives in the sand castle (which appeared on the previous season 3 title "This Is No Picnic") when appears their food basket was left behind inside the umbrella and they arrived to locate the food basket before Spike and Tyke tries to get rid of them and moves another section to build his own the sand castle to battle against the ants before they reach to steal his basket until they win the battle before their ants to retreat, but the big waves appear and lose the basket onto the sea when their ants was finally managed to claim the basket to sail onto the sunset for victory over the two dogs.
58a	6a	"Droopyman Returns"	Stewart St. John	October 16, 1993
Deep in the heart of Gossip City, Droopy Man and Dripple Boy returns to the action to stop the mad scientist Dr. Reginald Riff Rat for plans to turn the city onto the rats just like him and also tries to kidnap Cheetah Vavoom.
58b	6b	"Tom Thumped"	Jim Ryan	October 16, 1993
Wild Mouse was escaped from the Dingo Brothers Circus coming this weekend is being informed by Jerry's watching television when the police are searching and try to arrest him for chewing up his shoes where he meets Jerry in hideout before he helps him to get some food for the cat hungry, but is being chased by Tom to meet the white cat next door. She becomes his lover until she's more interested with a mouse-like Jerry in which she often refers to "Fuzzy Wuzzy". Despite the polices' attempts to arrest the Wildmouse after the chase, he sends him out on board the ship and waves goodbye to him. Later, Tom is so nervous when Jerry tells him his ideas to bring him to the w and then she cuddles him to get onto the limousine when he discovers she was already in love, leaving Tom's behind before he gets furious to taunts them, but then the steamroller flattens over him causing all of his fur to be shaved off, except on his face.
58c	6c	"Droopnet"	Bruce Morris	October 16, 1993
In the city on Friday night, detective cops Droopy and Rookie Dripple are searching for the notorious car thief named Scofflaw Badwrench. Note: This episode is a parody of the 1987 American buddy cop comedy film "Dragnet".
59a	7a	"Right-Brother Droopy"	Bruce Morris	October 23, 1993
Droopy and Dripple are the Right Brothers, and they compete with the airplane invention contest when the reporter Miss Scoops Vavoom comes by for them to be in the contest and win up to $20,000, while Flip-Flop McWolf (who is also the paperboy) also wants to participate as well to fly against them in the contest. Note: This episode is a parody of the "Wright Brothers".
59b	7b	"Cheap Skates"	Sandy Fries	October 23, 1993
During a chase, the TV tells Jerry can order the roller skates named Zip-Zip Roller Wheels which makes faster than the spacecraft so can be use it to mess up with him. And later, the TV also tells Tom to buy the same skates to chase around the house and the outside.
59c	7c	"Hollywood Droopy"	Patrick A. Ventura	October 23, 1993
Out in Hollywood, the washed-up producer and the owner of a Dilapidated Pictures Flops McWolf sees Droopy and Dripple as the stars of the new movie. They signed the contract (which was really an accident insurance policy) naming him benefactor so he can receive all the money if they have any accidents, but all the "accidents" while he tries to film them only happen to him.
60a	8a	"Fallen Archers"	Sandy Fries, Don Jurwich, and Jerry Eisenberg	October 30, 1993
In medieval times, Droopy and Dripple compete with the Father & Son Archery Contest against McWolf and his son Stinky, the winner of the contest will receive the romantic dinner date with the magic sand of the love angel Miss Vavoom.
60b	8b	"When Knights Were Cold"	Patrick A. Ventura	October 30, 1993
Since the knights are too cowardly to face the fire-breathing Wild Mouse, Tom is sent by the king to deal with him, but fails to capture him. Note: This episode is a guest voice by Tony Jay.
60c	8c	"The Mouth is Quicker Than the Eye"	Jim Ryan	October 30, 1993
Cal the Magnificent (Calaboose Cal) and the Mystery Lady (Miss Vavoom) helps her to do some more magicians to deal against a naughty boy named Bratty in his child's birthday party.
61a	9a	"Mutton for Punishment"	Sandy Fries	November 6, 1993
In the settling of the old west, sheepherders Droopy and Dripple protects the sheep from cattle barren Sidewinder McWolf and his henchman Cowboy Irwin with the help of these bad guys for plans to build with his own land called "Orange County".
61b	9b	"Cat Counselor Cal"	Jim Ryan	November 6, 1993
During the chase, a cat counseling and the customs equipment Calaboose Cal shows Tom with a few modern ways on his inventions to capture Jerry, but fails.
61c	9c	"Termite Terminator"	Jim Ryan	November 6, 1993
Pest exterminator Calaboose Cal was hired by the wealthy lady to get rid of pesky termites destroying her house. Note: This episode is similar to the 1975 The Tom and Jerry Show episode titled "Termites Plus Two".
62a	10a	"Bride of McWolfenstein"	Jim Ryan	November 13, 1993
Droopy and Dripple's car breaks down in front of a creepy castle. Inside the castle, the mad scientist McWolfenstein was creating the bride (which was similar voice by Miss Vavoom) for himself, when she spots Droopy was coming at the door, she falls madly in love to take dancing with him causing an irritated McWolfenstein to repair her body but still in love for him before she takes off with them to the Mad Scientist Land amusement park while McWolfenstein follows them in attempts to beat Droopy but fails before he feels so sad when he thinks nobody cares for him until he's wrong about them for the first time in his life when the four beautiful women likes him and carry him off. Then Dripple takes the bride off to ride the bumper cars while Droopy is waiting for them as he says to the audience, "Now there goes a chip off the old poodle".
62b	10b	"Hillbilly Hootenanny"	Bruce Morris	November 13, 1993
After they are battling out by using the cannonball to shoot around the village, Tom's hillbilly cousins was boring the game and they decide to take on the vacation to visit into his cousins house when they grab Jerry and throws him out of the house for stealing his food before they do a lot of dirty activities such as singing and dancing, and taste the special chili pot which they insulted him and kicks him out of the house, then Jerry calls his cousin for help to take them down of the cats off-screen until they stop fighting and leaves the house before Tom and Jerry want to follow them by riding his sidecar motorcycle.
62c	10c	"El Smoocho"	Jim Ryan	November 13, 1993
Droopy and Dripple are driving the coach in full of gold shipment with Miss Lily Vavoom to Dodge City, they come across the paths of El Smoocho (McWolf) who attempts to take her and tries to steal the gold off for himself.
63a	11a	"Droopy Hockey"	Patrick A. Ventura	November 20, 1993
At the arena, team Droopy Dry-Icers compete against team McWolf Blasters in the ice hockey championship match with Miss Vavoom as the ice queen (which was represented by the gold trophy for the winning team) and Dripple as the ice hockey referee.
63b	11b	"Hawkeye Tom"	Patrick A. Ventura	November 20, 1993
Both Tom and a hawkeye bird are pursuing Jerry in attempts to eat him.
63c	11c	"No Tom Like the Present"	Sandy Fries	November 20, 1993
After an anvil drops on him, Tom's spirit gets sent up to heaven when his mousetrap fails and is sent to the other place for mistreating Jerry. An angel cat tells him that he is on his 8th life so the angel cat gives him only one more chance to stay alive to avoid any injuries while he tries to catch Jerry. Note: This episode is similar to the 1949 Tom and Jerry short "Heavenly Puss".
64a	12a	"Dirty Droopy"	Jim Ryan	November 27, 1993
The public enemy 123456 and 7 Mangler McWolf gets detective Dirty Droopy fired when he says to the judge that Droopy had tortured him and he's innocent, he plans to spread through the crime spree, but detective Droopy can follow anywhere to stop him by using his teleport until McWolf gives up and goes down to prison, it turns out all of the Droopy people that had been appearing at McWolf.
64b	12b	"Two Stepping Tom"	Sandy Fries	November 27, 1993
An elephant named Tundo (voiced by Jim Cummings) is performing on stage by Sheboygan Records, Inc. and gets frightened and jumps onto the ceiling when he spots Jerry. The next day, Tom arrives at studio manager Mr. Sheboygan's office. he is requested to get rid of Jerry and make Tundo more enjoyable to avoid Jerry from ruining his concert. While singing, he gets spoiled by Tom and Jerry's chasing when Tundo aims Jerry to land on, but Jerry escapes and causes Tundo to land on Tom several times instead. After the concert, Mr. Sheboygan gives dollar bills for Tom as a reward, but Jerry teases Tundo causing him to jump into the air and landing on Tom before Jerry steals the bills out of Tom's hand and walks out with them. Note: Miss Vavoom also appears in this episode.
64c	12c	"Disc Temper"	Jim Ryan	November 27, 1993
The watchdog (whose 1st appearance was from the previous first episode title "Flippin' Fido") is on the job as a guard dog duty at the beach; the lifeguard tells him to take charge to remind him there are no pets allowed onto the beach while he's going on a lunch break and has to keep Tom and Jerry off the beach during their chase, so Tom distracts the watchdog again with frisbees. Note: The watchdog can talk for the only time in this episode.
65a	13a	"Order in Volleyball Court"	Sandy Fries	December 4, 1993
The volleyball championship play-offs between the challengers Droopy and Dripple against McWolf and his son Stinky, the winner of this game will receive $100,000 and get a chance to have a date with Miss Volley Vavoom.
65b	13b	"King Wildmouse – 10th Wonder of the World"	Bruce Morris	December 4, 1993
Tom and a hunter (voiced by Jim Cummings) go to the Mouse-co Island to locate Wildmouse where the hunter is too lazy while he tries to get it himself until Wildmouse gets caught in the curiosity mousetrap, when the hunter refuses to share the credit for him, Tom frees Wildmouse from the cage and takes him back home.
65c	13c	"Space Chase"	Sandy Fries	December 4, 1993
Tom and Jerry are selected to go into a Space Shuttle and test the experiment to see if they can live in peace and harmony in outer space, but they keep fooling around.

== See also ==
- List of Tom and Jerry characters § Tom & Jerry Kids (1990–93)
- List of works produced by Hanna-Barbera Productions
