= No-no =

No-no, No-No or no-no may refer to:

- No-hitter, also called a no-no, a baseball game in which a team was not able to record a single hit
- Elastic No-No Band, a musical group based in New York City's anti-folk scene, active from 2004–2011
  - No-No's (Leftovers and Live Songs), is the second official CD release by the antifolk group Elastic No-No Band
  - The Very Best of Elastic No-No Band So Far, the first official CD release of the antifolk group Elastic No-No Band
- Judy's Little No-No, a 1969 crime film about a go-go dancer who is targeted by gangsters after coming into possession of a priceless jewel
- No-No Boy (play), a play written by Ken Narasaki adapted from the novel of the same title by John Okada
- No-No Boy, a novel by John Okada about a Japanese-American set in 1946 in Seattle, Washington
- Noo-Noo, a character in the television series Teletubbies
- No-no, a baby talk phrase used when talking to a young child, meaning something bad, dangerous, unhealthy, inappropriate or rude; i.e. "a big no-no" or "eating candy before lunch is a no-no."
- "No No", a song by Westlife from Westlife
- A No No, a song by Mariah Carey

== See also ==
- "Nobody but Me", Isley Brothers' song noted for repeating the word "no"
- Nono (disambiguation)
- NONO (protein)
