= Didu =

Didu may refer to:

- Didu (woreda), a woreda (district) in Oromia Region, Ethiopia
- Didu, Iran, a village in Chahardangeh Rural District, Chahardangeh District, Sari County, Mazandaran Province, Iran
- Didu, Guangdong (地都), a town in Rongcheng District, Jieyang, Guangdong, China
- Didu, A gentleman from Bikaner, Rajasthan planning to make 100 million dollars.

== See also ==
- Yue opera, a Chinese opera genre, formerly known as Didu song (的篤班)
