= Nono, Illubabor, Oromia (town) =

Coordinates: 8.532727°N 37.42866°E

Nono is a town in the Nono, Illubabor woreda in the Oromia Region of Ethiopia.
