= Help!... It's the Hair Bear Bunch! =

American animated television series

- Title card
- Created by: Joe Ruby; Ken Spears
- Directed by: William Hanna; Joseph Barbera
- Voices of: Daws Butler; Paul Winchell; William Callaway; John Stephenson; Joe E. Ross
- Theme music composer: Hoyt Curtin
- Composer: Hoyt Curtin
- Country of origin: United States
- Original language: English
- No. of seasons: 1
- No. of episodes: 16

Production
- Executive producers: William Hanna; Joseph Barbera
- Producer: Charles A. Nichols
- Running time: 30 minutes
- Production company: Hanna-Barbera Productions

Original release
- Network: CBS
- Release: September 11, 1971 – January 8, 1972

Help! ... It's the Hair Bear Bunch! is an American animated television series created by Joe Ruby and Ken Spears and produced by Hanna-Barbera Productions, which aired on CBS on Saturday mornings from September 11, 1971, to January 8, 1972, for 16 episodes. Daws Butler, Paul Winchell and William Callaway voice the three bears that compose the Hair Bear Bunch, while John Stephenson and Joe E. Ross voice Mr. Eustace P. Peevly and Lionel J. Botch, respectively, the two individuals who patrol the zoo in which the bears live. The series' producer was Charles A. Nichols, with William Hanna and Joseph Barbera directing, and Hoyt Curtin serving as the composer.

A 13-issue comic book series was created by Gold Key Comics and began distribution in November 1971. Many television critics compared the premise of the show to other Hanna-Barbera productions, such as Wally Gator, Top Cat and Yogi Bear. While in syndication, the series aired on multiple television networks in the United States, including Boomerang, Cartoon Network, and the USA Network. In total, Help!... It's the Hair Bear Bunch! contained sixteen 30 minute-long episodes. It has also been released digitally to the Google Play Store and iTunes Store and physically on DVD as part of Warner Bros.' Archive Collection on a four-disc set.

== Storyline ==
The series follows the Hair Bear Bunch, a group of three bear cousins who live at the Wonderland Zoo run by zoo director Mr. Peevly and zookeeper Lionel Botch. They also serve as the "wacky heroes" of the show. The three bears would occasionally escape their luxurious cage to ride on their invisible motorcycles; however, they would always return to the cage before Mr. Peevly or Lionel Botch were able to catch them. Even Peevly and Botch are visited by their boss the Zoo Superintendent. The bears had several motives for pranking and fooling Mr. Peevly and Mr. Botch, including trying to improve their living conditions and wanting to embark on get-rich-quick schemes. The bears also wore clothes; according to author Christopher P. Lehman, Hanna-Barbera dressed the bears in counterculture apparel in order to stay on track with the mainstream fashion in the United States. Sometimes, the bears (usually Hair) would activate a hidden switch to reveal a cave with more luxurious surroundings (complete with modern furniture) instead of the more meager accommodations they were normally seen living in.

== Characters ==
The series features the following five main characters throughout its run:

- Daws Butler as Hair Bear, the afro-wearing leader of the Hair Bear Bunch. While developing a voice for Hair Bear, Butler "approximated his voice" to that of Phil Silvers as Sergeant Bilko in CBS's The Phil Silvers Show (1955–1959).
- Paul Winchell as Bubi Bear, the "more level-headed confederate" to Hair Bear, though he sometimes speaks in unintelligible gibberish.
- Bill Callaway as Square Bear, the most idiotic and "dimwitted" of the three bears, though he is the one who usually conjures up the "invisible motorcycle[s]" they use to make their escapes. His personality has also been described as "dopey" and "laid-back".
- John Stephenson as Mr. Eustace P. Peevly, the irritable, frustrated and authoritarian zoo director at Wonderland Zoo whom the three bears constantly try to outsmart – often successfully.
- Joe E. Ross as Lionel J. Botch, a zookeeper who is the "harebrained assistant" to Mr. Peevly. He is constantly completing work for Mr. Peevly, despite him putting Lionel "in dangerous situations for selfish reasons". He is also constantly rebuked by Peevly whenever he asks about his promotion to some unspecified title.

== Production and promotion ==
Executively produced and directed by William Hanna and Joseph Barbera's Hanna-Barbera Productions, Charles A. Nichols served as the series' main producer. Additionally, Robert "Bob" Givens contributed as one of the series' layout artists. The show's official theme song was written by Hoyt Curtin, who also served as the series' music composer. Other than the main cast, frequent Hanna-Barbera voice actors Janet Waldo, Joan Gerber, Lennie Weinrib, Vic Perrin and Hal Smith played several minor characters for the show. A group of five writers wrote for Help!... It's the Hair Bear Bunch!, including Joel Kane, Heywood Kling, Howard Morgenstern, and creators Joe Ruby, and Ken Spears.

Despite Stephenson ultimately playing the role of Mr. Eustace P. Peevly, Barbera had intended for Joe Flynn to play the part since the character was based on Flynn's Captain Binghamton from McHale's Navy; however, when Flynn came into audition for the part, Barbera was unimpressed and cast Stephenson for the part instead. Barbera claimed that "Joe Flynn didn't sound enough like Joe Flynn."

Gold Key Comics adapted several Hanna-Barbera and Saturday morning-based productions (such as The Funky Phantom, The Harlem Globetrotters, and Lidsville) into comic books. The adaptation of Help!... It's the Hair Bear Bunch! was titled just The Hair Bear Bunch and began distribution in 1972. 13 different issues were made for the series overall.

Help!... It's the Hair Bear Bunch! contained a laugh track created by Hanna-Barbera.

== Episodes ==
No.	Title	Original release date
1	"Keep Your Keeper"	September 11, 1971
The Hair Bear Bunch trick Mr. Peevly into thinking he has a disease called Zoolarium. When Mr. Peevly goes on vacation, a strict zoo keeper named Mr. Grunch is called in to cover for him, so the Hair Bear Bunch plan to find Mr. Peevly and persuade him to come back.
2	"Rare Bear Bungle"	September 18, 1971
The Hair Bear Bunch get a new roommate named Rare Bear, but Hair Bear suspects that he has been planted in their cave by Mr. Peevly to act as his spy.
3	"Raffle Ruckus"	September 25, 1971
Hair Bear suggests to Mr. Peevly to hold a raffle in order to obtain money for new facilities for the zoo. When Hair Bear wins, he ends up having ownership of the zoo and sees how hard it is to run the zoo and fill out the needs of the other animals. When Hair Bear learns that Mr. Peevly has been playing him, he ends up sneaking the other animals out of the zoo.
4	"Bridal Boo Boo"	October 2, 1971
In order to keep Mr. Peevly busy, Hair Bear decides to set him up with a female to be his girlfriend. Yet Mr. Peevly ends up getting a tough lady named Bertha, who brings order to the Wonderland Zoo.
5	"No Space Like Home"	October 9, 1971
The Hair Bear Bunch apply for an advert for adventure and fame, which turns out to be a space expedition to Mars sponsored by Professor Nielsen Rockabuilt. Mr. Peevly and Botch end up stowing away and end up landing on an alien planet of Turulia where the Turulians elect Mr. Peevly as their new leader. While in the alien's dungeons, the Hair Bear Bunch learn that the aliens elect a new leader every day, while the old one gets imprisoned in a glass cage.
6	"Love Bug Bungle"	October 16, 1971
Mr. Peevly ends up bunking a gorilla named Arnie into the Hair Bear Bunch's cave. Hair Bear discovers that Arnie is in love with Gloria the Gorilla and plans to hook both of them up, which involves making a cologne that causes him to lose control of his love advances.
7	"I'll Zoo You Later"	October 23, 1971
The Hair Bear Bunch plan to make their way to the National Forest. Once they do, the Hair Bear Bunch take refuge in a cabin, which turns out to be a hideout for two bank robbers, even when Mr. Peevly and Botch catch up to them.
8	"Ark Lark"	October 30, 1971
Following a drawing from the Suggestion Box, Mr. Peevly puts on a play of Noah's Ark with the zoo animals. Later that night, Hair Bear secretly places wheels on the Ark and pilots it all the way to Pleasure Island where they planned to go to a deserted island. To gain money, they disguise Zeed the Zebra as a horse and enter him in a race.
9	"Gobs of Gabaloons"	November 6, 1971
When Mr. Peevly wants the animals to build him a swimming pool, the Hair Bear Bunch finds a treasure map in one of the trees, which leads to the treasure of Redbeard which had been stolen from Ptomania. They follow the map to the end point to Mr. Peevly's office and try different ways to get to the treasure below.
10	"Panda Pandamonium"	November 13, 1971
While hiding from Mr. Peevly and Botch in the woods when trying to get to the carnival, the Hair Bear Bunch find a baby panda named Percy whose cage fell off a passing train bound for the St. Louis Zoo. Mr. Peevly has the Hair Bear Bunch watch over Percy Panda until the Zoo Superintendent comes to pick Percy up and bring him to the St. Louis Zoo.
11	"Closed Circuit TV"	November 20, 1971
Mr. Peevly sets up closed circuit TV cameras around the zoo to keep an eye on things, so that he can catch the Hair Bear Bunch in another one of their escapes. Hair Bear discovers the cameras and uses this to his advantage to make a television show.
12	"The Bear Who Came to Dinner"	November 27, 1971
Hair Bear has Square Bear fake an injury to have the Hair Bear Bunch evade being sent to the National Forest. Mr. Peevly ends up allowing Square Bear to recuperate at his house to evade getting into trouble with the Zoo Superintendent. Mr. Peevly vows to find a way to expose the fact that Square Bear is faking his injuries.
13	"Unbearably Peevly"	December 4, 1971
In order to catch the Hair Bear Bunch in one of their escape plans, Mr. Peevly and Botch disguise themselves as bears. Of course the Hair Bear Bunch play along with this, upon seeing through their disguises. Things get worse for Mr. Peevly and Botch when they are mistaken for escaped circus bears.
14	"Goldilocks and the Three Bears"	December 11, 1971
The Hair Bear Bunch end up getting involved in the production of "Whatever Happened to Goldilocks and The Three Bears" where Twinkles Sunshine (the actress playing Goldilocks) rewrites the script where the Three Bears have to save Goldilocks from an evil prince.
15	"The Diet Caper"	December 18, 1971
The Hair Bear Bunch and the other animals attempt to tunnel into town to get food, which leads the Hair Bear Bunch into a haunted house in an amusement park. The Hair Bear Bunch then end up tricking Mr. Peevly and Botch into going down the same path.
16	"Kling Klong versus the Masked Marvel"	January 8, 1972
In order to win $500 from the Sports Arena, Hair Bear has Bananas the Gorilla go through wrestling training in order to stay in the ring with the Masked Marvel. Yet when the Masked Marvel gets the measles, Botch ends up having to cover for him in the wrestling ring.

== Reception ==
=== Broadcast history ===
Help! ... It's the Hair Bear Bunch! was broadcast on CBS between September 11, 1971 and January 8, 1972. The series was cancelled after the first season, consisting of sixteen episodes, was completed airing; according to Lehman, the series was unsuccessful because it did not appeal to a younger audience, citing its similarities to The Phil Silvers Show as an additional reason. It returned Sunday mornings at 9:30 AM on September 9, 1973 then was moved to Saturdays at 8 AM on February 2, 1974 after CBS revamped their Saturday line-up.

In syndication, the series was replayed on several television networks after its cancellation. USA Network ran the series beginning February 19, 1989, and until November 7, 1991. The United States' Cartoon Network began broadcasting it in 1994 and its sister channel Boomerang did so on several occasions in the early-to-late 2000s until 2026 when it airs on MeTV Toons. A physical release on VHS first occurred in September 1988 and features three episodes from the series. Years later, as part of the Warner Bros. Television Distribution's Archive Collection, the complete Help! ... It's the Hair Bear Bunch series was made available on DVD as a four-disc set. It was also released digitally to the Google Play Store and iTunes Store libraries in its entirety.

=== Critical response ===
Help! ... It's the Hair Bear Bunch! was compared to several other Hanna-Barbera productions. David Mansour, author of From Abba to Zoom: A Pop Culture Encyclopedia of the Late 20th Century, compared the show's premise to the storyline of Hanna-Barbera's Top Cat and wrote, "but instead of a gang of hip cats residing in an alley, it starred a bunch of cool bears living at the zoo." Christopher P. Lehman, who wrote American Animated Cartoons of the Vietnam Era, also compared it to a previous television series, but instead to the live-action The Phil Silvers Show. Author David Perlmutter considered the show to be a reworked version of Yogi Bear, which he deemed appropriate because "the youth of the late 1960s and early 1970s" had a "'hippie' mindset." He also noted that because the series "incorporated some of the 'flip, sophisticated' style of the early animal con-artist formula, the series maintained a distinct connection with the time and place in which it was produced."

Besides Wait Till Your Father Gets Home (1972–1974) and Hong Kong Phooey (1974), Nichola Dobson wrote in The A to Z of Animation and Cartoons that Help! ... It's the Hair Bear Bunch! was one of Hanna-Barbera's more successful shows. However, in The Encyclopedia of Guilty Pleasures: 1001 Things You Hate to Love, three different authors labeled the series as one of Hanna-Barbera's "lesser-known efforts" but ultimately called it a "guilty pleasure" and enjoyed that it had its own score. In a retrospective view of older cartoons, the staff at MeTV included the show on their list of "15 Forgotten Cartoons from the Early 1970s You Used to Love." Deirdre Sheppard from Common Sense Media rated it three out of five stars and noted that it has "no educational content"; however, she also said that "other than the mildest of mild violence, and the characters' tendency to poke fun at each other, the series is fun and inoffensive."

== Other appearances ==
- The Hair Bear Bunch made guest appearances at a celebrity roast honoring Fred Flintstone in the TV special Hanna-Barbera's All-Star Comedy Ice Revue (1977).
- Hair appeared in Laff-a-Lympics issue 12, "The Ends of the Earth"
- In the Dexter's Laboratory episode "Chubby Cheese," Hair is a part of Chubby Cheese's animatronic band, he plays the banjo.
- Hair appeared in Harvey Birdman, Attorney at Law.
- In Top Cat Begins, Hair's afro adorns several posters and billboards advertising Hair Bear! The Musical throughout the film.
- The Hair Bear Bunch appear in Jellystone!

== See also ==
- List of works produced by Hanna-Barbera Productions
