= It's About Time (TV series) =

American fantasy/science-fiction comedy TV series of the 1960s

- Genre: Science fiction; Fantasy; Drama; Sitcom
- Created by: Sherwood Schwartz
- Starring: Frank Aletter; Jack Mullaney; Imogene Coca; Joe E. Ross; Cliff Norton; Mike Mazurki
- Theme music composer: Gerald Fried; George Wyle; Sherwood Schwartz
- Composer: Gerald Fried
- Country of origin: United States
- No. of seasons: 1
- No. of episodes: 26

Production
- Producer: Sherwood Schwartz
- Running time: 30 minutes per episode
- Production companies: Redwood Productions, Inc. Gladasya Productions, Inc.

Original release
- Network: CBS
- Release: September 11, 1966 – April 2, 1967

It's About Time is an American science fantasy comedy television series that aired on CBS for one season of 26 episodes from September 11, 1966 to April 2, 1967. The series was created by Sherwood Schwartz and used sets, props, and incidental music from Schwartz's other television series in production at the time, Gilligan's Island.

== Description ==
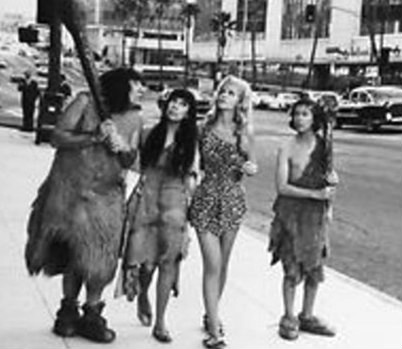
The cave family in the 20th century with Joe E. Ross, Imogene Coca, Mary (Graham) Grace, and Pat Cardi

Astronauts Mac McKenzie (Frank Aletter) and Hector Canfield (Jack Mullaney) travel faster than the speed of light, resulting in being sent back in time to prehistoric days where they have to adjust to living with a cave-dwelling family led by Shag/Shad (Imogene Coca) and Gronk (Joe E. Ross). Their children were 18-year-old Mlor (Mary Grace) and 14-year-old Breer (Pat Cardi). Tribe Chief Boss (Cliff Norton) and his right-hand man Clon (Mike Mazurki) were always suspicious of the astronauts.

Ratings were impressive for the first few weeks on the air, but they soon plunged. Show creator Schwartz concluded that three factors were the cause of the decline in audience interest:

- Repetition of the astronauts being in danger from dinosaurs, clubs, spears, volcanoes, and cavemen
- An unattractive look to the show (e.g., caves, dirt streets, etc.)
- The cave dwellers spoke a primitive form of English that was difficult to listen to

He retooled the series beginning with the January 22, 1967 episode, after 18 episodes set in prehistoric times, essentially reversing the premise that had been shown in the first half of the season. The astronauts repair their space capsule and return to 1967, with Shad, Gronk, and their children in tow. Boss and Clon make their final appearances in this episode, which also introduces two new supporting characters who remained with the show: Alan DeWitt as Mr. Tyler, manager of the apartment building where Mac and Hector live, and Frank Wilcox as General Morley, their commanding officer.

The prehistoric family begins adjusting to life in the 1960s, reacting to the unfamiliar surroundings and setting up a home in 20th-century Los Angeles. For example, Gronk and Shad had to learn to write their names and sign them for many salesmen who brought "presents" which had to be paid for later. Mac and Hector also had to convince their disbelieving superior that they really did travel in time and were not playing some sort of elaborate practical joke. Seven episodes were produced with this new premise before the series was canceled at the end of the season.

According to Pat Cardi, who played Greer, CBS considered reversing their cancellation decision after ratings improved during summer reruns; however, Imogene Coca and Joe E. Ross had already committed to other projects, officially ending the series.

== Episodes ==
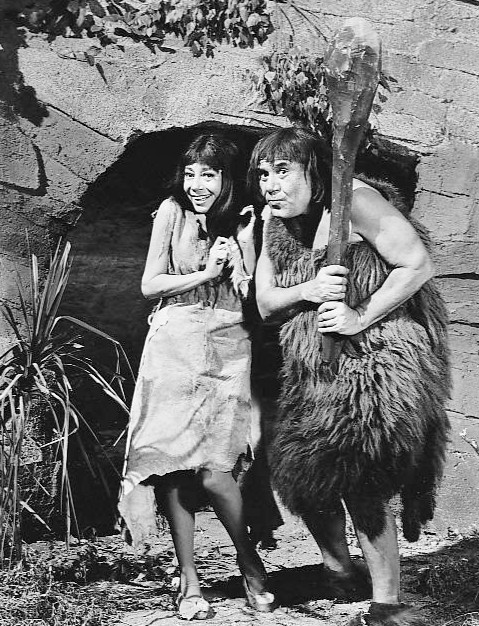
Imogene Coca and Joe E. Ross

No.	Title	Directed by	Written by	Original release date	Prod. code
1	"And Then I Wrote 'Happy Birthday to You'"	Richard Donner	David P. Harmon, Elroy Schwartz, Sherwood Schwartz	September 11, 1966	4202–0901
Mac and Hector introduce present day birthday customs to the cave people.
2	"The Copper Caper"	George Cahan	Joel Kane	September 18, 1966	4202–0902
The astronauts need copper, but the local supply is limited to a necklace worn by the unfriendly chief.
3	"The Initiation"	Jack Arnold	Bruce Howard	September 25, 1966	4202–0903
The astronauts try to obtain a dinosaur tooth.
4	"Tailor Made Hero"	Jack Arnold	Alan Dinehart, Herbert Finn	October 2, 1966	4202–0904
Gronk tries to prove he is as heroic as the astronauts.
5	"The Rainmakers"	George Cahan	Bill Freedman, Ben Gershman	October 9, 1966	4202–0905
Hector and Mac must end a drought or they will be sacrificed to the water spirit.
6	"Me Caveman—You Woman"	Jack Arnold	Budd Grossman	October 16, 1966	4202–0906
The astronauts are troubled that cavemen drag their women around by the hair as their form of courtship, so they do their best to institute modern, civilized courting techniques.
7	"The Champ"	Jerry Hopper	Alan Dinehart, Herbert Finn	October 23, 1966	4202–0907
The cave people learn how to use a slingshot.
8	"Mark Your Ballots"	Leslie Goodwins	Roland MacLane	October 30, 1966	4202–0908
Mac and Hector try to persuade the cave people to elect a new leader.
9	"Have I Got A Girl for You"	Leslie Goodwins	Jerry Adelman	November 6, 1966	4202–0909
Shad tries to find perfect mates for Mac and Hector.
10	"Cave Movies"	Jerry Hopper	Bruce Howard	November 13, 1966	4202–0910
Hector and Mac try to document their prehistoric predicament by filming daily activities.
11	"Androcles and Clon"	Jerry Hopper	Roland MacLane	November 20, 1966	4202–0911
Boss (Cliff Norton) wants to execute the astronauts because they have made an evil device.
12	"Love Me, Love My Gnook"	George Cahan	Alan Dinehart, Herbert Finn	November 27, 1966	4202–0912
A puppy has the astronauts facing death sentences - the cave dwellers believe dogs are bad luck.
13	"The Broken Idol"	Leslie Goodwins	Brad Radnitz	December 4, 1966	4202–0913
Hector and Mac try to keep the lid on a bubbling volcano.
14	"The Sacrifice"	Gary Nelson	Bill Freedman, Ben Gershman, Martin Roth	December 11, 1966	4202–0914
Mlor (Mary Grace) is about to be sacrificed in a cave ritual.
15	"King Hec"	Anton Leader	Arthur Weingarten	December 18, 1966	4202–0915
Hector steals Boss's thunder by making weather forecasts.
16	"The Mother-in-law"	Jerry Hopper	Jerry Adelman	December 25, 1966	4202–0916
Gronk (Joe E. Ross) moves in with the astronauts.
17	"Which Doctor's Witch?"	Leslie Goodwins	Albert E. Lewin	January 1, 1967	4202–0917
Mac and Hector search frantically for Boss, who has disappeared.
18	"To Catch a Thief"	Jerry Hopper	Budd Grossman	January 8, 1967	4202–0918
Someone is robbing the cave people.
19	"20th Century Here We Come"	George Cahan	Elroy Schwartz	January 22, 1967	4202–0920
Mac and Hector orbit back to the 20th century, accompanied by the Stone Age family.
20	"Shad Rack and Other Tortures"	Jerry Hopper	David P. Harmon	January 29, 1967	4202–0921
The astronauts try to convince a general that their primitive pals are in Los Angeles.
21	"The Cave Family Swingers"	Steve Binder	Sam Locke, Joel Rapp	February 5, 1967	4202–0922
The cave dwellers form a rock-and-roll band.
22	"To Sign or Not to Sign"	David Orrick McDearmon	Joel Kane	February 19, 1967	4202–0924
Mac teaches Gronk and Shad to write their names. With this new talent, they sign up for things.
23	"School Days, School Days"	Jack Shea	Michael Morris	February 26, 1967	4202–0925
Breer goes to school in the modern day world.
24	"Our Brothers' Keepers"	David Orrick McDearmon	Bill Freedman, Ben Gershman	March 5, 1967	4202–0926
Hector and Mac bring the cave family to the airbase to meet General Morley as proof they traveled back in time to the Stone Age.
25	"The Stone Age Diplomats"	Leslie Goodwins	Joel Kane	March 12, 1967	4202–0923
Mac and Hector's landlord wants to kick out Gronk and family from their apartment, but the boys set up a ruse that they are diplomats from a foreign country who simply dress differently.
26	"The Stowaway"	Dick Darley	Burt Styler	April 2, 1967	4202–0919
Hector tries to save Mlor from marriage to Boss's son.

- "The Stowaway" was originally scheduled to air January 15, 1967, but was pre-empted by an episode of Lassie after CBS revamped its prime time lineup following the first-ever Super Bowl which aired earlier that afternoon. This episode was set in prehistoric times and clearly predates the previous seven episodes. However, it did not air until April 2, 1967. In the show's current syndication reruns on certain networks – such as Antenna TV – this episode airs in its intended order, immediately preceding "20th Century Here We Come...".

== Home media ==
On June 27, 2017, ClassicFlix released The Complete Series on DVD in region 1.

== Merchandising ==
The TV series was adapted into a comic strip by Dan Spiegle, distributed by Gold Key Comics.
