= Ale (woreda) =

Woreda in Oromia Region, Ethiopia

Coordinates: 8°00′N 35°40′E

Ale is one of the woredas in the Oromia Region of Ethiopia. Part of the Illubabor Zone, Ale is bordered on the south by the Southern Nations, Nationalities and Peoples Region, on the west by Nono, on the northwest by Bure, and on the northeast by Metu. Towns in Ale include Ale, Gore and Leka. Didu woreda was part of Ale woreda.

Rivers in Ale include the Moro Kala and Waffa, both part of the drainage area of the Baro. High points include Mount Sidi.

Coffee is an important cash crop of this woreda. Over 50 square kilometers is planted with this crop.

== Demographics ==
The 2007 national census reported a total population for this woreda of 64,266, of whom 32,034 were men and 32,232 were women; 9,048 or 14.09% of its population were urban dwellers. The plurality of inhabitants were Moslem, with 37.22% of the population reporting they observed this belief, while 33.48% of the population said they practised Ethiopian Orthodox Christianity, and 29.12% were Protestant.

Based on figures published by the Central Statistical Agency in 2005, this woreda has an estimated total population of 104,291, of whom 53,060 are men and 51,231 are women; 16,038 or 15.38% of its population are urban dwellers, which is greater than the Zone average of 12%. With an estimated area of 1,494.22 square kilometers, Ale has an estimated population density of 69.8 people per square kilometer, which is less than the Zone average of 72.3.

The 1994 national census reported a total population for this woreda of 73,207 in 16,960 households, of whom 36,050 were men and 37,157 women; 8,977 or 12.26% of its population were urban dwellers at the time. The three largest ethnic groups reported in Ale were the Oromo (85.55%), the Amhara (6.98%), and the Kafficho (3.98%); all other ethnic groups made up 3.49% of the population. Oromiffa was spoken as a first language by 90.18%, 5.84% Amharic, and 2.26% spoke Kafa; the remaining 1.72% spoke all other primary languages reported. The majority of the inhabitants professed Ethiopian Orthodox Christianity, with 56.55% of the population reporting they practiced that belief, while 34.7% of the population said they were Muslim, 6.49% Protestant, and 1.41% were Catholic.
