= Joe E. Ross =

American actor and comedian (1914–1982)

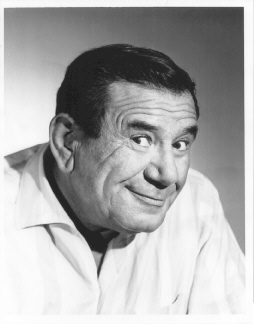
- Ross c. 1966
- Born: Joseph Roszawikz; March 15, 1914; New York City, New York, U.S.
- Died: August 13, 1982 (aged 68); Los Angeles, California, U.S.
- Occupations: Actor; comedian
- Years active: 1938–1982

Joe E. Ross (born Joseph Roszawikz; March 15, 1914 – August 13, 1982) was an American actor and comedian known for his trademark "Ooh! Ooh!" exclamation, which he used in many of his roles. He starred in such TV sitcoms as The Phil Silvers Show and Car 54, Where Are You?.

== Career ==
Ross was born on March 15, 1914, to Jewish immigrant parents in New York City who owned a candy store. Aged 16, he dropped out of Seward Park High School to become a singing waiter at the Van Cortlandt Inn in the Bronx. When the cafe added a female dancer and singer, Ross was promoted to announcer. He added some jokes and became a comedian.

In 1938, he appeared at the Queens Terrace, near Jackson Heights, New York. Jackie Gleason had already been playing there for 16 weeks, and the manager was about to ask Gleason to stay a while longer. Ross heard of the opening, auditioned for it, got the contract, and also stayed for 16 weeks. He then turned burlesque comic on the Schuster circuit out of Chicago.

His career was interrupted by World War II. He served in the United States Army Air Corps at Camp Blanding, Florida, before being stationed in England.

Discharged at the war's end, Ross became an announcer-comic at Billy Gray's Band Box in Hollywood. He kept his ties to burlesque, and appeared in Irving Klaw's feature-length theatrical film Teaserama (1955), a re-creation of a burlesque show.

In 1955, Ross worked at a nightclub in Miami Beach called Ciro's. He was spotted by Nat Hiken and Phil Silvers, who were planning You'll Never Get Rich (later known as The Phil Silvers Show and sometimes Sgt. Bilko) and loved Ross's comedy skills. Ross was hired on the spot and cast as the mess sergeant, Rupert Ritzik.

Ross (left) doing part of a routine with Dave Starr in Teaserama (1955)

Ross made Ritzik memorable. Ritzik was henpecked, stupid, and greedy, always an easy mark for Bilko's schemes. Whenever Ritzik had a sudden inspiration, he would hesitate and stammer "Ooh! Ooh!" before articulating his idea. The catchphrase came from the actor's own frustration when he couldn't remember his lines. Silvers would deliberately stray from the scripted dialogue and give Ross the wrong cues, prompting a genuinely confused reaction and an agonized "Ooh! Ooh!" from Ross. Another exclamation Ross used often on the show was "I knew it! I knew it!" each time he lost money on a gambling bet he had been hesitant to make. It began a running gag that Ritzik was jinxed against any bet made with Bilko.

After The Phil Silvers Show ended in 1959, Nat Hiken went on to produce Car 54, Where Are You? and cast Ross as Patrolman Gunther Toody of New York's 53rd Precinct. Fred Gwynne, another Bilko alumnus, played Toody's partner, Francis Mulldoon. Toody could usually be counted on at some point to say "Ooh! Ooh!", or "Do you mind? Do—you—mind?". Ross became so identified with his policeman role that he recorded an album of songs entitled "Love Songs from a Cop". Roulette Records released the LP in 1964. Ross did the voice for Toody for the episode "Car 54" of Hanna-Barbera's Wait Till Your Father Gets Home, in which Toody and Mulldoon moonlight running a day care center and one of the children turns up missing.

Ross also starred as Gronk in Sherwood Schwartz's ill-fated 1966 sitcom It's About Time, which featured two 1960s American astronauts who were thrown back in time to the prehistoric era.

Following the breakup of Allen & Rossi in 1968, Steve Rossi teamed for less than three months with Ross in an act called "Rossi & Ross". Rossi & Ross played once on Ed Sullivan and disbanded in January 1969.

Ross also was a prominent cartoon voice into the 1970s, playing the stereotypical bumbling sergeant in many cartoons such as Hong Kong Phooey (as Sgt. Flint) and Help!... It's the Hair Bear Bunch! (as Botch). He also voiced Roll on CB Bears segment Shake, Rattle and Roll. His "Ooh! Ooh!" catchphrase was emulated by Frank Welker in the animated series Fangface and Norm Prescott as Theodore H. Bear in The New Adventures of Mighty Mouse and Heckle and Jeckle's Quacula episodes. He was also one of the few white comedians with 1970s label Laff Records, which specialized in African-American comedians and released his album Should Lesbians Be Allowed to Play Pro-Football?.

== Personal life ==
Ross had trouble memorizing his lines and used his catchphrase "Ooh! Ooh!" as a delaying tactic to remember what he was supposed to say. He was often known as a difficult person to work with and co-workers complained that he was continually vulgar, even cursing around children. Imogene Coca, who played Ross's caveman wife in the sitcom It's About Time, hated working with Ross and referred to him as "that awful man."

Others, however, called him "a man of sweet character" and he was described as a "trouper, cooperative and hard working" during his career. Who's Who in Comedy: Comedians, Comics, and Clowns from Vaudeville to Today's Stand-Ups described Ross as having a "Runyonesque sweetness and likeability despite his obtuseness (that) kept him performing right up to the end."

== Death ==
Ross died of a heart attack on August 13, 1982, while performing in the clubhouse of his apartment building in Los Angeles, The Oakwood Apartments. He was buried in Forest Lawn-Hollywood Hills Cemetery. Jay Leno, who met Ross when he first arrived in Hollywood and said Ross was the first movie star to become his friend, delivered the eulogy. Ross' gravestone is inscribed with the double entendre "This man had a ball".

== Selected filmography ==
- The Sound of Fury (1950) - Nightclub Entertainer (uncredited)
- This Woman Is Dangerous (1952) - Asst. Manager (uncredited)
- Models, Inc. (1952) - Front Man (uncredited)
- Teaserama (1955) - Burlesque comic
- Around the World in Eighty Days (1956) - Extra (uncredited)
- Hear Me Good (1957) - Max Crane
- Maracaibo (1958) - Milt Karger
- Tall Story (1960) - Mike (uncredited)
- The Bellboy (1960) - Joey, Gangster
- All Hands on Deck (1961) - Bos'n
- Tony Rome (1967) - Bartender at Paradise Club (uncredited)
- The Love Bug (1968) - Detective
- Judy's Little No-No (1969)
- Beach Boy Rebels (1969)
- The Boatniks (1970) - Nutty Sailor
- The Naked Zoo (1970) - Mr. Barnum
- The Juggler of Notre Dame (1970)
- Revenge is My Destiny (1971) - Maxie Marks
- Frasier, the Sensuous Lion (1973) - Kuback
- The Godmothers (1973) - Gino
- How to Seduce a Woman (1974) - Bartender
- Alias Big Cherry (1975)
- Linda Lovelace for President (1975) - Dirty Guy #2
- The World Through the Eyes of Children (1975) - Michael
- Slumber Party '57 (1976) - Michael
- The Happy Hooker Goes to Washington (1977) - Night Watchman
- Gas Pump Girls (1979) - Bruno
- Skatetown, U.S.A. (1979) - Rent-a-Cop
- The Woman Inside (1981)

== Television ==
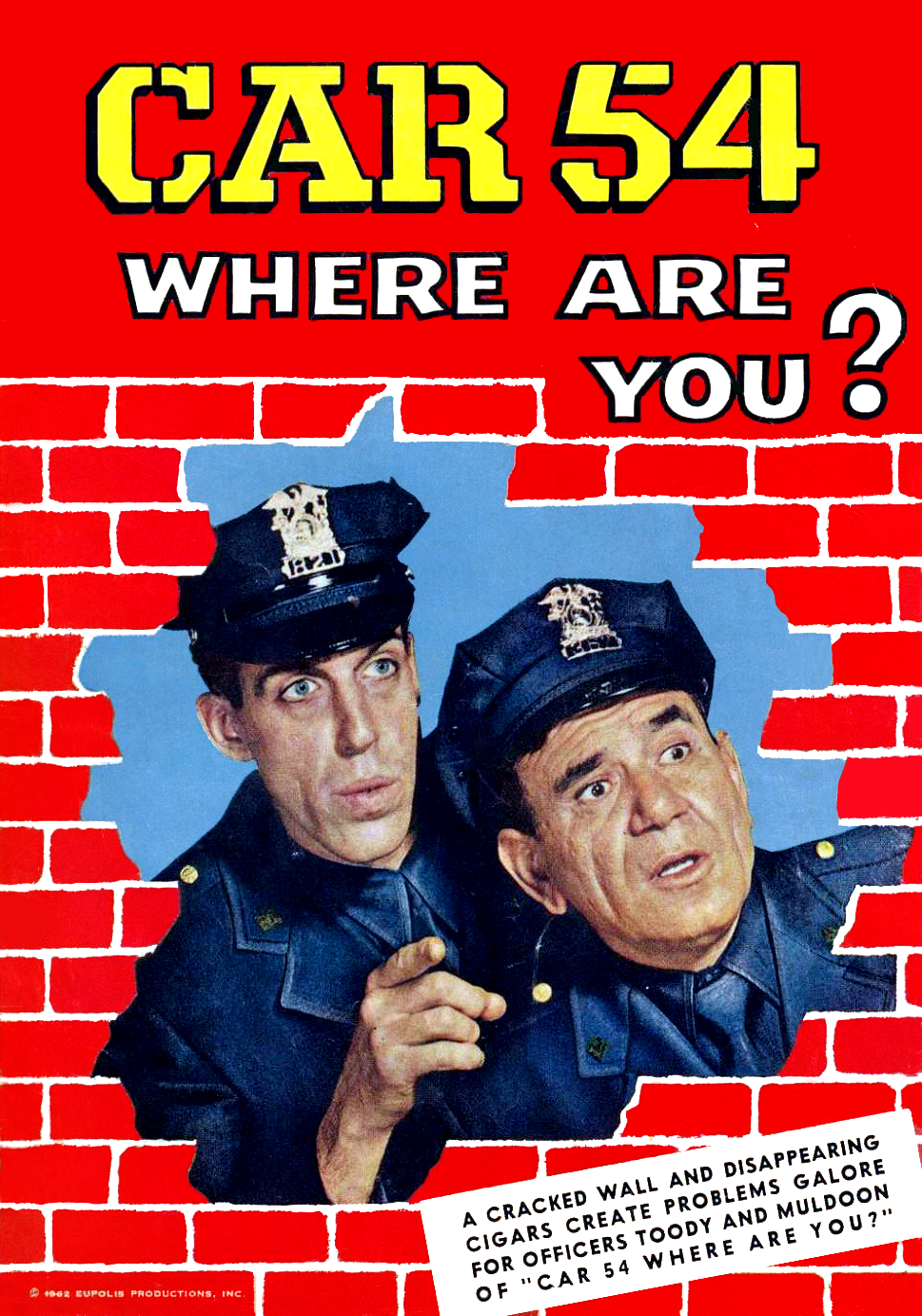
Ross (right) pictured with Fred Gwynne, Car 54, Where Are You?

- The Colgate Comedy Hour - Episode #2.19 (1952)
- The Phil Silvers Show - 55 episodes - MSgt. Rupert B. Ritzik (1956–1959)
- Car 54, Where Are You? - 60 episodes - Officer Gunther Toody (1961–1963)
- It's About Time - 26 episodes - Gronk (1966–1967)
- Batman - episode - The Funny Feline Felonies - Talent Agent (uncredited) (1967)
- The Red Skelton Hour - episode - The Pied-Eyed Piper - Clancy the Cop (1968)
- McMillan & Wife - episode - The Easy Sunday Murder Case - The Doorman (1971)
- Help!... It's the Hair Bear Bunch! - 16 episodes - Botch (voice) (1971)
- The Adventures of Robin Hoodnik - television movie - Deputy Oxx (voice) (1972)
- Love, American Style - episode - Love and the Cryptic Gift / Love and the Family Hour / Love and the Legend / Love and the Sexpert (segment: "Love and the Sexpert") (1973)
- Hong Kong Phooey - 31 episodes - Sergeant Flint (voice) (1974)
- Wait Till Your Father Gets Home - episode - Car 54 - Officer Gunther Toody (voice) (1974)
- The Ghost Busters - episode - Jekyll & Hyde: Together, for the First Time! - Mr. Hyde (1975)
- The Tom & Jerry Show - episode - See Dr. Jackal and Hide / Planet of the Dogs / The Campout Cutup (segment: "Planet of the Dogs") (1975)
- CB Bears - Segment - Shake, Rattle, & Roll - 13 episodes - Roll (voice) (1977)
- The Love Boat - episode - A Selfless Love/The Nubile Nurse/Parents Know Best - Mr. Ross (1978)
