= Tom & Jerry Kids =

American animated television series

- Also known as: Tom & Jerry Kids Show (season 1)
- Genre: Comedy; Slapstick; Surreal comedy
- Based on: Tom and Jerry by: William Hanna; Joseph Barbera
- Voices of: Charlie Adler; William Callaway; Teresa Ganzel; Patrick Fraley; Dick Gautier; Phil Hartman; Don Messick; Frank Welker; Patric Zimmerman
- Theme music composer: Tom Worrall
- Composers: Tom Worrall; Gary Lionelli (seasons 2–4)
- Country of origin: United States
- Original language: English
- No. of seasons: 4
- No. of episodes: 65 (195 segments) (list of episodes)

Production
- Executive producers: William Hanna; Joseph Barbera; Paul Sabella (season 1)
- Producers: Don Jurwich; Joseph Barbera (seasons 2–4)
- Editors: Gil Iverson; Tim Iverson; Pat Foley (season 1); Tom Gleason (seasons 3–4)
- Running time: 22 minutes (7 minutes per segment)
- Production companies: H-B Production Co. (Note: Animation outsourced to Wang Film Productions, Fil-Cartoons and Mr. Big Cartoons.); Turner Entertainment Co.

Original release
- Network: Fox (Fox Kids Network)
- Release: September 8, 1990 – December 4, 1993

Related
- The Tom and Jerry Comedy Show (1980); Tom and Jerry Tales (2006–08); Droopy, Master Detective (1993)

Tom & Jerry Kids (formerly known as Tom & Jerry Kids Show in the first season) is an American animated television series co-produced by H-B Production Co. and Turner Entertainment Co., and starring the cat-and-mouse duo Tom and Jerry as toddlers (toddler kitten and baby mouse). It premiered on Fox on September 8, 1990, airing as the first program of the children's programming block, Fox Kids, and was the second Tom and Jerry TV series to be produced by Hanna-Barbera following The Tom & Jerry Show in 1975.

The series is somewhat similar to the "older" version of the original theatricals, partly akin to being produced by creators William Hanna and Joseph Barbera, founders of Hanna-Barbera and former MGM cartoon studio staff.

== Segments ==
=== Tom and Jerry ===
The Tom and Jerry Kids cartoons are based on the classic shorts, Tom and Jerry, but it stars the kitten and mouseling instead. They remain silent like their older selves and both of them are attempting to outwit each other, exactly like in the original shorts. Some of the plots and gags are recycled from old Tom and Jerry cartoons, but the violence is toned down for younger viewers.

=== Spike and Tyke ===
The Spike and Tyke segments are based on the characters, Spike and Tyke from the original Tom and Jerry series. Strangely, Spike is still an adult and Tyke is slightly older in this series. Spike still loves his son, Tyke, more than anything and enjoys spending time with him. Additionally, Tyke now has the ability to talk, which mean that he has grown smarter and more intelligent. Spike's toughness is only used on occasions, as these segments mostly revolve around his love for his son and on teaching family values. Additionally, Spike and Tyke are grey like their debut appearances in the classic Tom and Jerry shorts, with Tyke wearing a blue collar.

=== Droopy and Dripple ===
The Droopy and Dripple segments feature characters from the classic Tex Avery shorts starring Droopy. Droopy has a different job every episode and his son Dripple (a tinier, identical version of him) always follows him as his assistant. The two will usually end up clashing with McWolf, the before-unnamed villainous wolf from Avery shorts that, envious of their success, will use any dirty trick against them to win, but inevitably fails. The beautiful Miss Vavoom (Red in Avery shorts) is another possible source of conflict between the two, as both of them have a crush on her and she, or a kiss from her, is often the prize of some sort of competition.

Their "detective" segments were later spun-off into Droopy, Master Detective.

=== Slowpoke Antonio ===
Slowpoke Antonio is the western cousin of Jerry. While he appeared in the "Tom and Jerry" segments, Slowpoke Antonio did star in two cartoons.

=== Calaboose Cal ===
Calaboose Cal is a gold cat and mouse exterminator who often helps Tom try to catch Jerry. While he appeared in the Tom and Jerry segments, Calaboose Cal did star in two cartoon shorts.

=== Wild Mouse ===
Wild Mouse is a ferocious mouse who often aids Jerry in thwarting Tom. While he appeared in the "Tom and Jerry" segments, Wild Mouse did star in two cartoon shorts.

=== Blast-Off Buzzard ===
Season 4 features a new adaption of the Blast-Off Buzzard segment from the CB Bears where the characters actually talk. In these segments, Blast-Off Buzzard leads his biker gang of buzzards as they try to catch Crazylegs. Only two episodes were made.

== Episodes ==
Season	Segments	Episodes	Originally released	
Season	Segments	Episodes	First released	Last released
1	39	13	September 8, 1990	December 1, 1990
2	39	13	September 14, 1991	December 7, 1991
3	78	26	September 12, 1992	December 13, 1992
4	39	13	September 11, 1993	December 4, 1993

== Principal voice actors ==
- Charlie Adler – Dripple, Lightning Bolt the Super Squirrel, Crazylegs, Rap Rat (in "Rap Rat is Where It's At"), Urfo's Mother (in "Urfo Returns")
- William Callaway – Slowpoke Antonio
- Patrick Fraley – Kyle the Cat, Yolker (in "Super Droop and Dripple Boy Meet the Yolker"), Zebra (in "Love Me, Love My Zebra"), Tyrone the Tiny (in "Barbecue Bust-Up")
- Teresa Ganzel – Miss Vavoom, Skier ("Downhill Droopy"), Lt. Lucy (in "Mess Hall Mouser"), White Tabby (in "Tom Thumped")
- Dick Gautier – Spike
- Phil Hartman – Calaboose Cal, Hot Dog Vendor (in "Pound Hound"), Inspector Le Paw (in "Pound Hound")
- Don Messick – Droopy, Bat Mouse (in "Bat Mouse"), Narrator (in "Scourge of the Sky")
- Frank Welker – Tom, Jerry, McWolf, Wild Mouse, Urfo, Moncy, Bat Cat (in "Bat Mouse"), Ants (in "This is No Picnic"), Caveman (in "Prehistoric Pals"), Chino the Kitten (in "Who Are You Kitten"), Commander (in "Scourge of the Sky"), Jester (in "When Knights Were Cold"), Male Mouse Students (in "Chase School"), Martian Mouse (in "Martian Mouse"), Museum Manager (in "The Watchcat"), Narrator (in "Wild Mouse II"), Salesmouse (in "S.O.S. Ninja"), Stinky Jr. (in "Fallen Archers," "Order in the Volley Ball Court"), Urfo Catcher (in "Urfo Returns"), Momma Seagull (in "Cast Away Tom"), Elephants (in "Cast Away Tom"), Rhino (in "Cast Away Tom"), Ostrich (in "Cast Away Tom"), Lions (in "Cast Away Tom"), Gorilla (in "Cast Away Tom"), Zap Men (in "Maze Monster Zap Men")
- Patric Zimmerman – Tyke

== Production and broadcast ==
The series was a co-production between Hanna-Barbera and Turner Entertainment Co., serving as the former's second Tom and Jerry series after The Tom & Jerry Show in 1975. This is the first Tom and Jerry series to be produced by Turner Entertainment, after they had bought the Tom and Jerry franchise from Metro-Goldwyn-Mayer in 1986. Parent company Turner Broadcasting System would buy the Hanna-Barbera studios in late 1991 starting with the third season. Perhaps the most notable differences from the classic shorts are the pair's appearances (and ages). Concept art by Jerry Eisenberg showed that Tom was planned to live with his parents, but this was changed to him living with human owners. Tom & Jerry Kids was one of the last Saturday-morning cartoons from Hanna-Barbera before shifting focus toward producing shows specifically for Cartoon Network.

In 1994, Fox canceled the series and ended its run on Fox Kids on September 4, 1994, but it soon began airing in reruns on Cartoon Network (which Turner launched to showcase its large animation library, including the original Tom and Jerry) in 1995, and ended in 2007 when the show was removed from the Cartoon Network schedule and moved to its sister channel Boomerang. However, it made a brief return to the Cartoon Network airwaves on June 4, 2023, during a marathon consisting on other Tom and Jerry shows. In the MENA region, an Arabic-language version of the show was broadcast on Spacetoon from July 13, 2000, to December 31, 2004.

== Home media ==
In 1991, 12 episodes were put on two VHS cassettes in the United States, although only a few million copies were made. Eleven VHS cassettes were released in the United Kingdom. The series was released on DVD in Germany by Kinowelt Home Entertainment on July 11, 2008, as the first official DVD release. In 2010, the episode Flippin' Fido was included in the Deluxe Anniversary Collection DVD set with the original opening and closing titles restored, different from TV airing versions.

On April 30, 2013, Warner Home Video released the first season of the show on DVD for the first time. The remaining 3 seasons have yet to see a DVD release. In the United Kingdom, Season One was released as 2 separate DVDs on August 12, 2013, under the titles Baby Tom and Jerry, as part of WB's Big Faces range. Like the U.S. release of Season One, Baby Tom includes the first seven half-hour episodes, while Baby Jerry includes the remaining 6 episodes.

DVD name	Ep #	Release date
The Complete Season 1	13	April 30, 2013

== Awards ==
This show was given a Daytime Emmy nomination in 1992 for Outstanding Music Direction and Composition.

== Comic book ==
In Mexico, Editorial Vid made a comic book based on Tom & Jerry Kids in 1990. Tom and Jerry (the original older versions) have their own comic book there, and the Tom & Jerry Kids comic book is followed by Tom and Jerry.

== See also ==
- List of works produced by Hanna-Barbera Productions
- The Tom & Jerry Show (1975)
- List of Tom & Jerry Kids episodes
- List of characters in Tom & Jerry Kids
