= The Tom & Jerry Show (1975 TV series) =

1975 American animated television series

- Also known as: The New Tom & Jerry Show
- Genre: Comedy
- Created by: William Hanna; Joseph Barbera
- Based on: Tom and Jerry by: William Hanna; Joseph Barbera
- Directed by: William Hanna; Joseph Barbera
- Voices of: John Stephenson
- Theme music composer: Hoyt Curtin
- Opening theme: "The Tom & Jerry Show"
- Ending theme: "The Tom & Jerry Show" (Instrumental)
- Composer: Hoyt Curtin
- Country of origin: United States
- No. of episodes: 16 (48 segments)

Production
- Executive producers: William Hanna; Joseph Barbera
- Producer: Iwao Takamoto (creative producer)
- Editors: Pat Foley; Joe Sandusky; James Yaras; Richard Allen; Terry Moore
- Running time: 23 minutes (7 minutes per segment)
- Production companies: Hanna-Barbera Productions; MGM Television

Original release
- Network: ABC
- Release: September 6 – December 13, 1975

Related
- The Tom and Jerry Comedy Show (1980)

The Tom & Jerry Show is an American animated television series produced by Hanna-Barbera Productions in association with MGM Television. Based on the Tom and Jerry theatrical cartoon series, which was created by H-B co-founders and former MGM cartoon studio staff William Hanna and Joseph Barbera, the show originally aired on ABC from September 6 to December 13, 1975 (for a total of 16 episodes) as the first half-hour of The Tom & Jerry/Grape Ape/Mumbly Show, with The Great Grape Ape Show representing the series' second half-hour and The Mumbly Cartoon Show representing the series' third half-hour. This series marked the first time that Tom and Jerry appeared in animated installments produced specifically for television.

== Premise ==
Unlike other incarnations, Tom and Jerry are shown as friends instead of enemies and this series did not use the slapstick chases and the violence central to the theatrical shorts due to concerns at the time regarding such material on children's programming.

Most episodes have either of them dealing with different hi-jinks at home, working different jobs, and contending with Spike.

== Voice cast ==
- John Stephenson – Tom (vocal effects only), Jerry (vocal effects only), Macho Cat (in "Beach Bully"), Cosmic Cat (in "Cosmic Cat and Meteor Mouse"), Rex the Lion (in "The Hypochondriac Lion"), Spike (in "Triple Trouble"), Pierre LeChoppe (in "The Big Feet"), various
- Henry Corden – Giant (in "Beanstalk Buddies")
- Kathy Gori – Katy O'Kitty (in "The Police Kitten"), Fairy Godmother (in "Chickenrella"), Short Stepsister (in "Chickenrella")
- Don Messick – Spike, Quacker (in "The Lost Duckling"), Meteor Mouse (in "Cosmic Cat and Meteor Mouse"), Zookeeper (in "The Hypochondriac Lion"), Giant Watchdog (in "Beanstalk Buddies"), Big Feet (in "The Big Feet"), various
- Alan Oppenheimer – Ringmaster (in "Stay Awake or Else..."), Sapstone (in "The Sorcerer's Apprentices")
- Joe E. Ross – Spike (in "Planet of the Dogs")
- Hal Smith – Black Barney
- Jean Vander Pyl – Evil Stepmother (in "Chickenrella"), Fairy godmother (in "Chickenrella")
- Janet Waldo – Yvonne Jockalong (in "The Ski Bunny"), Cindy (in "Chickenrella"), Tall Stepsister (in "Chickenrella")
- Lennie Weinrib – Dinky (in "Jerry's Nephew"), Squirrel (in "Triple Trouble")
- Frank Welker – Additional Voices

== Episodes ==
No.	Title	Original release date	Prod. code
1a	"No Way, Stowaways"	September 6, 1975	80-03
Caught stowing away on a pirate ship, Tom and Jerry compete to become the ship's cabin boy and avoid being thrown overboard by a pirate named Weirdbeard.
1b	"The Ski Bunny"	September 6, 1975	80-02
While skiing in the Swiss Alps, Tom and Jerry compete for the affections of a pretty female cat, and try not to get into trouble with Spike.
1c	"Stay Awake or Else..."	September 6, 1975	80-01
After partying all night, a circus roustabout Tom cannot stay awake on the job, Jerry tries to keep him from being fired by the ringmaster.
2a	"No Bones About It"	September 13, 1975	80-04
A dinosaur's toe bone was missing from the museum in which Tom and Jerry work; they see Spike carrying what they think is the missing bone, so they try to get it away from him.
2b	"An Ill Wind"	September 13, 1975	80-05
An old traveler in a desert gives Tom and Jerry a map to a gold mine to thank them for saving his life; the two of them fight over it, and also have to deal with the outlaw Black Barney who wants it too.
2c	"Beach Bully"	September 13, 1975	80-06
Tom and Jerry's day at the beach is being interrupted by a macho cat who will not leave them alone. They plan to get revenge on the cat in creative ways, and also get Spike involved.
3a	"The Mammoth Manhunt"	September 20, 1975	80-07
A baby woolly mammoth (voiced by Frank Welker) revived after being frozen in ice escapes from the explorer who had thawed him out and who wants to display him for money. Tom and Jerry help the mammoth to get back home to Alaska while evading the greedy explorer.
3b	"The Wacky World of Sports"	September 20, 1975	80-08
Tom and Jerry compete against each other in a decathlon. Tom uses a variety of underhanded tricks against Jerry which manage to work against Tom as well.
3c	"Robin Ho Ho"	September 20, 1975	80-10
Tom and Jerry want to join Robin Ho Ho's band of Merry Men. After passing a few tests, including laughing and archery, the duo must pass the final test by stealing the red plume from the Sheriff of Nottingham's helmet. Note: The title character is a parody of Robin Hood.
4a	"Safe But Not Sorry"	September 27, 1975	80-18
Tom and Jerry are hired to deliver a heavy safe to a house at the top of a steep hill (à la The Music Box), but sabotaging their efforts is a mischievous puppy who lives in the house.
4b	"Gopher Broke"	September 27, 1975	80-09
The vegetables in Tom and Jerry's garden are being devoured by a gopher, and all of their attempts to get rid of him fail to work.
4c	"The Super Bowler"	September 27, 1975	80-11
Tom and Jerry's compete against each other in the National Bowl-Off, and Tom resorts to a number of dirty tricks to win.
5a	"Tricky McTrout"	October 4, 1975	80-20
Fishermen Tom and Jerry attempt to catch a crafty fish named Tricky McTrout, but everything they try just gets them into trouble with the park ranger.
5b	"The Tennis Menace"	October 4, 1975	80-13
Tom and Jerry compete against each other in a tennis match, with Tom using a number of sneaky tricks to win.
5c	"Cosmic Cat and Meteor Mouse"	October 4, 1975	80-15
Tom and Jerry try to watch their favorite television show Cosmic Cat and Meteor Mouse, without waking up Spike.
6a	"The Castle Wiz"	October 11, 1975	80-14
Tom and Jerry are offered $20 to spend a night in a haunted castle.
6b	"Grim and Bear It"	October 11, 1975	80-16
Fledgling forest rangers Tom and Jerry try to protect a mischievous bear cub from danger without invoking his mother's wrath.
6c	"The Flying Sorceress"	October 11, 1975	80-19
A witch recruits Tom and Jerry to help her in her flying cauldron. First, she has them dust the crops (with a feather duster) and then she runs a passenger service. The title is a reference to the classic Tom and Jerry short with the same name.
7a	"The Kitten Sitters"	October 18, 1975	80-27
Tom and Jerry take in six abandoned kittens without Spike's knowledge, and the sight of a kitten who seems to be everywhere almost drives him crazy.
7b	"Termites Plus Two"	October 18, 1975	80-21
Tom and Jerry try to stop the gang of termites (on tiny motorcycles) from destroying their house.
7c	"Planet's Pest"	October 18, 1975	80-24
A shape-shifting space alien tries to eat all the food in the house, causing Tom, Jerry, and Spike to fight each other and almost giving them a nervous breakdown.
8a	"The Hypochondriac Lion"	October 25, 1975	80-23
A lion (voiced by John Stephenson) at the zoo has a splinter in his paw, and veterinarians Tom and Jerry are hired to remove it, but the nervous lion is not making it easy for them.
8b	"Give 'Em the Air"	October 25, 1975	80-31
Tom and Jerry work together in a cross-country airplane race against the cheating Purple Baron.
8c	"The Egg and Tom and Jerry"	October 25, 1975	80-34
When an egg falls out of an eagle's nest, the newly-hatched eaglet thinks that Tom is his mother, while the mother eagle thinks that Jerry is her baby.
9a	"Watch Out, Watch Dog"	November 1, 1975	80-12
Spike is assigned as a night watchdog for a department store; he mistakes janitors Tom and Jerry for prowlers, and spends the night chasing them throughout the store.
9b	"The Super Cyclists"	November 1, 1975	80-25
Tom and Jerry compete against each other in a cross-country motorcycle race.
9c	"The Police Kitten"	November 1, 1975	80-28
Police officers Tom and Jerry are assigned to train Katy O'Kitty, a female feline rookie, by letting her ride with them; their resentment over this assignment is made worse by the fact that she is better at their job than they are.
10a	"The Outfoxed Fox"	November 8, 1975	80-30
A pushy fox hides out in Tom and Jerry's house from a pursuing hound.
10b	"The Towering Fiasco"	November 8, 1975	80-17
Professional dog walkers Tom and Jerry are hired to walk an English sheepdog who keeps running into trouble. The title is a takeoff with The Towering Inferno.
10c	"The Lost Duckling"	November 8, 1975	80-37
Tom and Jerry help a duckling (Quacker in his only appearance on the show) to go south for the winter, using a variety of methods from a paper plane to a railroad handcar. Note: The plot is the same as the classic CinemaScope Tom and Jerry short Southbound Duckling.
11a	"Beanstalk Buddies"	November 15, 1975	80-22
In this takeoff of Jack and the Beanstalk, an impoverished Tom and Jerry find themselves in a giant's castle in the sky, and try to evade a giant watchdog to get some food.
11b	"Two Stars Are Born"	November 15, 1975	80-29
Tom and Jerry are hired as stuntmen in a movie in which Catman and Reubin (a takeoff with Batman and Robin) do battle with a giant space alien.
11c	"Son of Gopher Broke"	November 15, 1975	80-39
In this sequel to "Gopher Broke", groundskeepers Tom and Jerry try to stop the gopher from ruining their wealthy employer's garden and they create chaos in the process.
12a	"The Sorcerer's Apprentices"	November 22, 1975	80-26
Sapstone the Sorcerer, dissatisfied with his canine apprentice Manfred, recruits Tom and Jerry to be his new apprentices. Upset about being replaced, Manfred challenges the duo to a duel of magic wands.
12b	"Hold That Pose"	November 22, 1975	80-38
Safari photographers Tom and Jerry try to get a picture of the rare Pip Squaker bird which has never been photographed before.
12c	"The Supercape Caper"	November 22, 1975	80-42
Supercape, a Superman-like superhero, has lost his courage. He "deputizes" Tom and Jerry, who help him take down a number of villains.
13a	"Chickenrella"	November 27, 1975	80-32
After falling asleep when reading Cinderella, Tom and Jerry dream themselves into the story, helping Cindy and her blundering fairy godmother who briefly turns the girl into a chicken, hence the title.
13b	"Double Trouble Crow"	November 27, 1975	80-33
Corn farmers Tom and Jerry try to get rid of a crow who is intent on devouring their crops; it later turns out that they were dealing with a whole family of lookalike crows.
13c	"Jerry's Nephew"	November 27, 1975	80-44
Jerry's nephew Dinky (who refers to both Tom and Jerry as his uncles) has come to visit, and the duo are run ragged when trying to keep him out of danger with one of them having to get him away from a hen and contending with her rooster husband.
14a	"See Dr. Jackal and Hide"	November 29, 1975	80-35
Dr. Jackal is working on a formula to make short people tall. When he tests it on himself, he transforms into a monster, causing his lab assistants Tom and Jerry to run for their lives. Note: This cartoon is a spoof of Strange Case of Dr Jekyll and Mr Hyde.
14b	"Planet of the Dogs"	November 29, 1975	80-43
While running from Spike, Tom and Jerry find themselves on a NASA rocket headed for the planet Dogstar, where the canine inhabitants of the planet are being brainwashed by a giant talking idol into believing that cats and mice are their enemies. Note: This cartoon is a parody of the film Planet of the Apes.
14c	"The Campout Cutup"	November 29, 1975	80-45
While camping, Tom and Jerry are bedeviled by a mosquito who resists their attempts to get rid of him.
15a	"Triple Trouble"	December 6, 1975	80-36
Tom and Jerry try to chop down a tree for a log cabin, but the squirrel who lives in the tree convinces them not to. The three of them then have to contend with Spike, who is bulldozing trees to make room for a freeway.
15b	"The Bull Fighters"	December 6, 1975	80-41
In Mexico, Tom and Jerry save the life of a bull named Toro the Terrible, who promises to be their friend for life. Later, Tom finds himself being a bullfighter against Toro. At first Tom and Toro put on a show for the crowd, with neither actually hurting the other, but the injured Toro is being replaced by a fiercer bull named El Rotteno.
15c	"The Cruise Kitty"	December 6, 1975	80-46
The captain of a cruise liner puts mascot Spike in charge of security, and Tom and Jerry are accidental stowaways on the ship. Spike keeps trying to call the captain's attention to them, but he keeps failing to prove their presence.
16a	"It's No Picnic"	December 13, 1975	80-40
An ant who has accidentally been enlarged to human size escapes from a research laboratory and invades Tom and Jerry's picnic, eating all of the food, a baseball and a bat.
16b	"The Big Feet"	December 13, 1975	80-47
Lumberjack Pierre LeChopp enlists Tom and Jerry to help him trap the elusive Big Feet (a takeoff with Bigfoot), who has been scaring away all of his lumberjacks.
16c	"The Great Motorboat Race"	December 13, 1975	80-48
Tom and Jerry are working together to compete in a boat race.

== Broadcast history ==
A total of 48 seven-minute Tom and Jerry shorts were produced in 1975 and originally aired in these following formats on ABC Saturday morning:

- The Tom & Jerry/Grape Ape Show (September 6, 1975 – September 4, 1976, ABC Saturday 8:30–9:30 a.m. [EDT])
- The Tom & Jerry/Grape Ape/Mumbly Show (September 11, 1976 – November 27, 1976, ABC Saturday 8:00–9:00 a.m. [EDT]) (reruns of Tom & Jerry and Grape Ape)
- The Tom & Jerry/Mumbly Show (December 4, 1976 – September 3, 1977, ABC Saturday 8:00–8:30 a.m. [EDT]) (reruns)
- The Tom & Jerry Show (international reruns)

Immediately following the end of the original ABC run, these cartoons were edited within the main and end title credits and added to run with theatrical-era MGM Tom and Jerry cartoons from 1940 to 1967 for syndication by MGM until 1986 (H-B retained ancillary rights to the Mumbly and Grape Ape segments, with syndication rights to those segments going to Worldvision Enterprises from 1979 until 1991). Some independent television stations in the 1980s have aired the Tom and Jerry segments without the Mumbly and Grape Ape segments in their syndicated Tom and Jerry package as part of some stations' lineup, such as WFLD in Chicago and WYAH in Portsmouth, Virginia.

Since 1986, it has been rebroadcast on TBS, Cartoon Network, Boomerang and Canada's Teletoon and Teletoon Retro.

The cartoons have been shown with the main and end title credits intact on TBS, the Boomerang streaming service, and Cartoon Network.

From 1985 until 1995, ATN, later Seven Network (the Australian "American Broadcasting Company") aired the show in Australia.

== Home media ==
The premiere episode (show #TJGA-1, September 6, 1975) of The New Tom and Jerry/Grape Ape Show was released as part of Warner Home Video's Saturday Morning Cartoons – 1970s Volume 2 on October 27, 2009; it marked the first home video release of the 1975 made-for-TV version of Tom and Jerry. Another cartoon, episode #80-15, "Cosmic Cat and Meteor Mouse", is included as part of the Tom and Jerry: The Deluxe Anniversary Collection, which was released by Warner Home Video on June 22, 2010. The episode (show #TJGA-11, November 15, 1975) of The New Tom and Jerry/Grape Ape Show was released as the digital version of Tom and Jerry: School's Out. 2 episodes was released as the digital version of Tom and Jerry: House Pests.

== Reception ==
Despite initial skepticism from long-time fans over the gentler, non-violent format, the 1975 show became a runaway ratings hit for ABC. It quickly dominated its 8:30 AM slot, capturing a massive audience of young viewers. The show proved to network executives that famous animated characters could draw huge ratings on television while strictly adhering to modern censorship guidelines. The success of the 16-episode, 48-segment run helped cement Tom and Jerry's place in modern pop culture, giving the characters a second life beyond theatrical re-runs. While contemporary animation historians often criticize the low-budget, limited animation and tame plotlines compared to the original MGM theatrical shorts, the series enjoyed a massive post-broadcast legacy.

When Joseph Barbera was asked in 2000 by The Guardian if public pressure had resulted in Tom and Jerry being less violent in this show, he said that the same arguments were going on 50 years ago.

== See also ==
- List of works produced by Hanna-Barbera Productions
- Tom & Jerry Kids (1990–1993), another Tom and Jerry TV series produced by Hanna-Barbera
