= Judy's Little No-No =

- Theatrical release poster
- Directed by: Sherman Price
- Written by: Sherman Price
- Produced by: Edward Jacobs
- Starring: Elisa Ingram; John Davis Lodge; Joe E. Ross; Marlene; Zorita
- Release date: 1969
- Running time: 84 minutes
- Country: United States
- Language: English

Judy's Little No-No (also released as Let's Do It) is a 1969 crime film about a go-go dancer who is targeted by gangsters after coming into possession of a priceless jewel. The film was directed and written by Sherman Price and stars Elisa Ingram, John Davis Lodge, and Joe E. Ross.
