= Didu (woreda) =

Woreda in the Oromia region of Ethiopia

Didu is one of the woredas in the Oromia Region of Ethiopia. It was part of Ale woreda.

== Demographics ==
The 2007 national census reported a total population for this woreda of 32,639, of whom 16,316 were men and 16,323 were women; 1,163 or 3.56% of its population were urban dwellers. The majority of the inhabitants were Muslim, with 50.91% of the population reporting they observed this belief, while 25.52% of the population said they practised Ethiopian Orthodox Christianity, and 23.28% were Protestant.
