= Nono Sele =

District in Oromia Région, Ethiopia

Coordinates: 7°45′N 35°15′E

Nono Sele is one of the woredas in the Oromia Region of Ethiopia. It is named after the Nono Oromo, a subgroup of the Macha Oromo, who live in this area. Part of the Illubabor Zone, Nono Sele is bordered on the southwest by the Gambela Region, on the north by Bure, on the northeast by Ale, and on the southeast by the Southern Nations, Nationalities and Peoples Region. Towns in Nono Sele include Birbirsa and Nono.

== Demographics ==
The 2007 national census reported a total population for this woreda of 22,902, of whom 11,487 were men and 11,415 were women; 1,744 or 7.62% of its population were urban dwellers. The majority of the inhabitants were Protestant, with 44.21% of the population reporting they observed this belief, while 40.35% of the population said they practised Ethiopian Orthodox Christianity, and 9.89% were Moslem.

Based on figures published by the Central Statistical Agency in 2005, this woreda has an estimated total population of 25,649, of whom 13,027 are men and 12,622 are women; 1,849 or 7.21% of its population are urban dwellers, which is less than the Zone average of 12%. With an estimated area of 2,868.29 square kilometers, Nono has an estimated population density of 8.9 people per square kilometer, which is less than the Zone average of 72.3.

The 1994 national census reported a total population for this woreda of 18,354 in 4,319 households, of whom 9,065 were men and 9,289 women; 1,033 or 5.63% of its population were urban dwellers at the time. The four largest ethnic groups reported in Nono were the Oromo (69.13%), the Mocha (20.94%), the Majangir (4.7%), and the Amhara (4.52%); all other ethnic groups made up 0.71% of the population. Oromiffa was spoken as a first language by 74.95%, 18.89% Mocha, 4.72% Majangir, and 1.2% Amharic; the remaining 0.24% spoke all other primary languages reported. The majority of the inhabitants professed Ethiopian Orthodox Christianity, with 76.52% of the population reporting they practiced that belief, while 10.79% of the population said they were Muslim, and 10.44% observed traditional religions.
