= Milt Gross =

American cartoonist and animator (1895-1953)

- Born: March 4, 1895 Bronx, New York, U.S.
- Died: November 29, 1953 (aged 58) Pacific Ocean
- Areas: Cartoonist; Animator
- Notable works: He Done Her Wrong, Count Screwloose

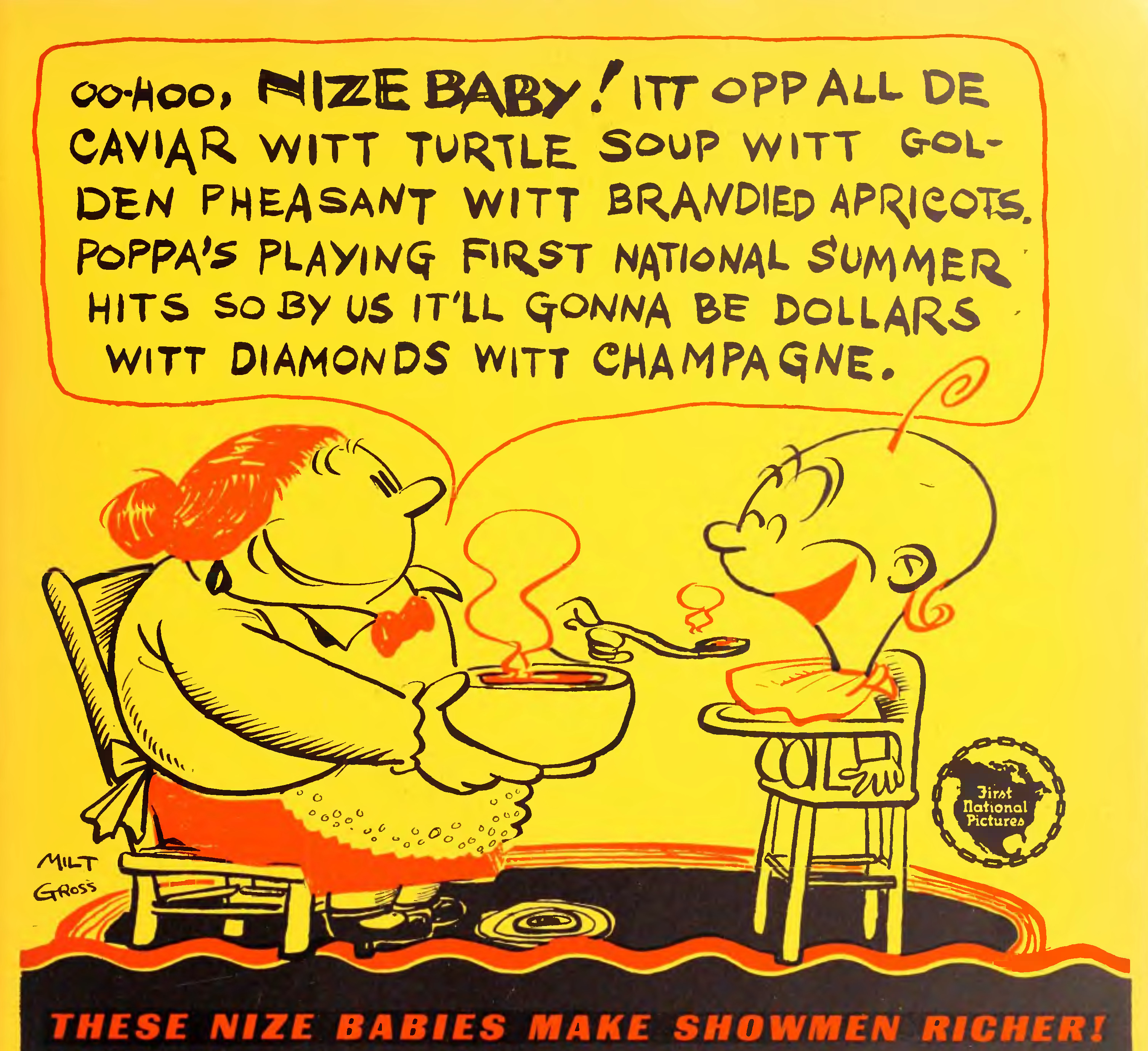
Nize Baby art by Milt Gross for First National Pictures in Motion Picture News, 1926

Milt Gross (/ɡroʊs/; March 4, 1895 – November 29, 1953) was an American cartoonist and animator. His work is noted for its exaggerated cartoon style and Yiddish-inflected English dialogue. He originated the non-sequitur "Banana Oil!" as a phrase deflating pomposity and posing. His character Count Screwloose's admonition, "Iggy, keep an eye on me!", became a national catchphrase. The National Cartoonists Society fund to aid indigent cartoonists and their families, for many years was known as the Milt Gross Fund. In 2005, it was absorbed by the Society's Foundation, which continues the charitable work of the Fund.

== Comic strips and books ==
Gross was born in the Bronx and served as a soldier in World War I. After apprenticing as a teenage assistant to Tad Dorgan, Gross's first comic strip was Phool Phan Phables for the New York Journal, begun when he was 20, featuring a rabid sports fan named George Phan. It was one of several short-lived comic strips (and other undertakings, including his first animated film) before his first success, Gross Exaggerations, which began as an illustrated column, "Gross Exaggerations in the Dumbwaiter", in the New York World. Originally titled Banana Oil until 1925, the comic strip was retitled Gross Exaggerations until becoming The Feitelbaum Family on June 1, 1926, and finally Looy Dot Dope on January 7, 1927. Its Yinglish vocabulary would set the tone for much of Gross' work, as would its reworkings of well-known tales, as in "Nize Ferry-tail from Elledin witt de Wanderful Lemp" and "Jack witt de Binn Stuck". These were gathered in a 1926 book Nize Baby, which evolved into a Sunday newspaper color comic strip.

Also in 1926, he published Hiawatta witt No Odder Poems, a 40-page parody of Longfellow's The Song of Hiawatha, each of its pages, in the words of Jim Vadeboncoeur, Jr., "with a barely decipherable stanza and a drawing which only sometimes helped". In subsequent years, Gross followed with De Night in de Front from Chreesmas, Dunt Esk (1927) and Famous Fimmales witt Odder Ewents from Heestory (1928).

In 1930, Gross published what many consider his masterpiece, the pantomime tale He Done Her Wrong: The Great American Novel and Not a Word in It — No Music, Too. Minus words, this "novel" is composed entirely of pen-and-ink cartoons, nearly 300 pages long, and is comparable to such silent films serials as The Perils of Pauline. It resembled (and parodied) Lynd Ward's Gods' Man, the first American wordless novel, published the previous year.. It has been reprinted several times, including an abridged version in 1983 (retitled Hearts of Gold) and in 2005 by Fantagraphics, under its original title.

Starting in 1931, Gross worked for the Hearst chain, doing various syndicated comic strips and Sunday topper strips, including Dave's Delicatessen, Banana Oil, Pete the Pooch, Count Screwloose from Tooloose, Babbling Brooks, Otto and Blotto, The Meanest Man, Draw Your Own Conclusion, I Did It and I'm Glad! and That's My Pop! (which later became a radio show). While his strips' vocabulary moved closer to standard English over time, his work always maintained Yiddish touches. In 1936, he illustrated two books in collaboration, Pasha the Persian (by Margaret Linden) and What's This? (with Robert M. Low and Lou Wedemar).

In 1945, the year of his book Dear Dollink, he suffered a heart attack and went into semi-retirement. His last book was I Shouda Ate the Eclair (published 1946), in which one Mr. Figgits nearly starts World War III because he refuses to eat a chocolate éclair. In 1946–47, his work appeared in the short-lived comic book Picture News. His final published work appeared in the pages of comic books published by American Comics Group, including two issues of Milt Gross Funnies. In 1950, two of his earlier books were combined as Hiawatta and De Night in De Front From Chreesmas.

== Animation ==
Gross made occasional animated films through the silent film era, including The Ups & Downs of Mr. Phool Phan (his first), Useless Hints by Fuller Prunes, Izzy Able the Detective and How My Vacation Spent Me. Most of these were for Bray Productions, the studio of John R. Bray. Others were for Universal.

In 1939, he returned to animation by directing two cartoons at Metro-Goldwyn-Mayer, Jitterbug Follies and Wanted: No Master, featuring Count Screwloose (voiced by Mel Blanc) and J.R. The Wonderdog. According to Bill Littlejohn, they were both extremely funny works. Fred Quimby thought them to be too vulgar and had Gross fired. Animator William Hanna and screenwriter Joseph Barbera despised the experience and believed the films to be subpar. Gross would also co-write the 1943 Screen Gems cartoon He Can't Make It Stick (directed by John Hubley and Paul Sommer), after he pitched the story to then-producer Dave Fleischer and writer Stephen Longstreet.

== Death ==
On November 29, 1953, Gross died of a heart attack aboard the Pacific Ocean liner SS Monterey, while returning from a Hawaiian vacation with his wife. He was buried at Hillside Memorial Park Cemetery in Culver City, California. At the time of his death, he was developing a children's TV show starring his character Pete the Pooch, which combined animation with live-action footage of Gross as host. Two pilot episodes were completed but never shown to the public.

== Legacy ==
In 2009 the New York University Press published Is Diss a System?: A Milt Gross Comic Reader, which argues for Gross' importance as a link between the cartooning cultures of the first and second halves of the 20th century, especially as they related to Jewish culture.

In August 1971, Dover Publications reprinted Nize Baby. In 2010, cartoon historian Craig Yoe edited The Complete Milt Gross Comic Books and Life Story, a complete collection of the Gross comic book stories from the 1940s with a lengthy illustrated biography by Yoe and an Al Jaffee introduction.

== Bibliography ==
- Banana Oil! (1924) M.S. Publishing Co.
- Nize Baby (1926) George H. Dolan Company
- Hiawatta witt No Odder Poems (1926) George H. Doran Co.
- De Night in de Front from Chreesmas (1927) George H. Doran Co.
- Dunt Esk!! (1927) Grosset & Dunlap
- Famous Fimmales witt Odder Ewents from Heestory (1928) Doubleday, Doran & Co.
- He Done Her Wrong (1930) Doubleday, Doran & Co.
- What's This? (with Robert M. Low and Lou Wedemar) (1936) Simon and Schuster
- Pasha the Persian by Margaret Linden, illustrated by Milt Gross (1936) Claude Kendall, Inc.
- That's My Pop Goes Nuts for Fair: A Cartoon Tour of New York (1939) The Bystander Press. Reprinted 2015 as Milt Gross’ New York: A Lost Graphic Novel
- Dear Dollink (1945) G.P. Putnam's Sons
- I Shoulda Ate the Eclair (1946) Ziff-Davis Publishing Co.
- Milt Gross Funnies #1 (August 1947) American Comics Group
- Milt Gross Funnies #2 (September 1947) American Comics Group
- Hiawatta and De Night in de Front from Chreesmas (1950) Doubleday
- The Smithsonian Collection of Newspaper Comics (1977) Bill Blackbeard, ed., Smithsonian Institution Press/Harry Abrams
- He Done Her Wrong (Reprinted 2006) Fantagraphics ISBN 1-56097-694-2
- Art Out of Time: Unknown Comics Visionaries 1900–1969 (2006) Dan Nadel, ed., Abrams ISBN 0-8109-5838-4
- Is Diss a System?: A Milt Gross Comic Reader (2009) Ari Kelman, ed., NYU Press ISBN 0-8147-4823-6
- The Complete Milt Gross Comic Books and Life Story (2010) Craig Yoe, ed., IDW Publishing ISBN 1-60010-546-7
- Gross Exaggerations: The Meshuga Comic Strips of Milt Gross (2020) Peter Maresca, ed. Sunday Press Books ISBN 978-0-98355-048-8

== Sources ==
- Cohen, Karl F. (2004), "Censorship of Theatrical Animation", Forbidden Animation: Censored Cartoons and Blacklisted Animators in America, McFarland & Company, ISBN 978-0786420322
