= Gallopin' Gals =

1940 film by William Hanna and Joseph Barbera

- Title card
- Directed by: William Hanna; Joseph Barbera
- Produced by: Fred Quimby (uncredited on original release)
- Starring: Elvia Allman; Sara Berner; Truman Bradley; Blanche Stewart (all uncredited)
- Music by: Scott Bradley (uncredited)
- Color process: Technicolor
- Production company: Metro-Goldwyn-Mayer
- Distributed by: Loew's, Inc.
- Release date: October 26, 1940
- Running time: 7 minutes
- Country: United States
- Language: English

Gallopin' Gals is a 1940 American animated short film directed by William Hanna and Joseph Barbera. It was released on October 26, 1940, alongside the feature film Hullabaloo. It is one in numerous one-shot cartoons directed by Hanna and Barbera before committing to the Tom and Jerry series. It was released as a Gold Medal Reprint in 1951.

== Plot ==
Fillies at the Kentucky Derby with New York accents, gossiping about some of the other contestants, partake in a race. The underdog of the story is a shy, lonely horse named Maggie who has never won a race in her life and has hay fever. During the race, the other horses competing are distracted by a photo finish. They fall short of the finish line, in second place simultaneously, while the picture is taken. Maggie crosses in front of them, winning the race.

== See also ==
- List of films about horses
- List of films about horse racing
