= Robert Allen (animator) =

American animator (1909–2008)

Robert Yeats Allen
- Born: May 14, 1909; Kansas City, Missouri, U.S.
- Died: May 19, 2008 (aged 99); Fallbrook, California, U.S.
- Occupations: Animator, film director
- Spouse: Minnie Coffie
- Children: 1
- Relatives: Heck Allen (brother)

Robert Yeats Allen (May 14, 1909 – May 14, 2008) was an American animator and film director. He is best known for his work for the Metro-Goldwyn-Mayer cartoon department.

== Biography ==
Allen was born in Kansas City, Missouri. He was hired by Harman-Ising Productions, producers of the Looney Tunes and Merrie Melodies series, as an animator. He did not become a lead animator until the studio left their contract with Warner Bros. Pictures in favor of Metro-Goldwyn-Mayer, after which most of Harman-Ising's lead animators left for Leon Schlesinger Productions. His animation skill flourished under the Happy Harmonies series, which were given extravagant budgets unlike the series at Warners. Allen became the studio's Bosko specialist, animating Bosko as well as drawing comic strips with the character, which were syndicated by cartoonist and Hugh Harman's brother Fred Harman starting from 1934.

Allen left Harman-Ising in 1938 alongside most of their staff, as MGM terminated Harman-Ising's contract and formed a new studio under Fred Quimby, who aggressively hired Harman-Ising's staff. His brother, Heck Allen, followed him to the studio as a screenwriter and enjoyed a more successful career writing for Tex Avery. Allen was promoted to director on The Captain and the Kids alongside fellow Harman-Ising alumni William Hanna and Friz Freleng. Allen's poor directorial skills led to him being demoted to animator after three cartoons alongside Hanna (as a storyman). His unit was handed to Burt Gillett, who left after directing one cartoon. After Quimby was forced to hire Hugh Harman and Rudolf Ising after failing to produce successful cartoons, Allen worked under Ising, who eventually allowed him to direct cartoons as an uncredited co-director, including Little Cesario (1941) and the Barney Bear cartoon The Flying Bear (1941). After directing Chips Off the Old Block (1942), under which he is credited, he left the studio alongside Ising and his crew. He wound up animating for Hugh Harman Productions in around 1945. Despite his early retirement from animation, Allen outlived his peers and died in 2008.
