= The Early Bird Dood It! =

1942 film by Tex Avery

- The reissue title card of the cartoon. On the original title card the bird has a tail.
- Directed by: Tex Avery
- Story by: Rich Hogan
- Produced by: Fred Quimby (uncredited in original issue)
- Starring: Kent Rogers; Frank Graham; Tex Avery
- Music by: Scott Bradley
- Animation by: Irven Spence; Preston Blair; Ed Love; Ray Abrams
- Color process: Technicolor
- Production company: Metro-Goldwyn-Mayer
- Distributed by: Loew's, Inc.
- Release date: August 29, 1942
- Running time: 9 minutes
- Language: English

The Early Bird Dood It! is a 1942 MGM cartoon directed by Tex Avery and produced by Fred Quimby. The composer of this cartoon was Scott Bradley.

== Plot ==
The cartoon opens with the printed words:

To the ladies
The worm in this photoplay
is fictitious - Any similarity
between this worm and your
husband is purely intentional.

The camera pans over a forest, shown with no accompanying background music. There is a sign that reads: "Quiet, isn't it?" Then, the camera zooms to a hole in the ground, from which emerges a worm (who eventually is revealed to be a caricature of Lou Costello) wearing a bowler hat. The worm sees a bird in the distance and races back into his hole. The bird, uttering threats, sticks his beak in and ends up with a handkerchief tied around it. The bird writes a zero, the third of the week, in his "worm ration card" book. The bird says that he will see us "tomorrow morning" and strides off.

The worm comes out and tells the viewers that the bird is trying to catch him every day, and that it is making him a nervous wreck. He wishes he could get rid of the bird, and then he sees a chance: a cat that has just failed in his effort to catch a mouse.

The worm approaches the cat, introduces himself as the worm as in "the early bird catches the..." and asks the feline if he "could go for a fat, juicy bird". The cat licks his chops and replies in the affirmative. The worm shows him a blueprint plan of action for the next morning: the bird chases the worm to his hole, the worm jumps in. The cat then catches the bird and eats it. The worm tells the cat that he'll see him in the morning, then pulls down a rolling screen in order to bring in the next morning.

The plan goes well until the cat engages in dopey conversation and fails to eat the bird, who escapes. The cat then chases the bird around and around a tree. The bird soon disengages, pops out of a hollow in the tree and hits the still-racing cat with a club. After uttering, "Ouch" the cat embarks on a swearing rant (a word-stamp appears indicating Censored Dialogue).

The worm, having seen none of this, appears from his hole and walks off carefree - until he comes face to beak with the bird. He runs away and attempts to jump back into his home; the bird is waiting in the hole, mouth open. A chase ensues. They pass a billboard advertising the film "Mrs. Minimum" (spoofing Mrs. Miniver) and its accompanying cartoon, the very one the bird and the worm are in. The bird says, "Hey, I hear that's a pretty funny cartoon." The worm replies, "Well, I hope it's funnier than this one!" The chase resumes.

Hidden in a bush, the worm manipulates his form to appear as a beautiful woman's leg. While the bird is reveling in this sight, he is clubbed by the worm with a baseball bat. Retrieving the bat, the bird sets up to return the bashing, but stops himself when he sees the worm is actually standing on the cat's head. The cat chases the bird until they come upon a bar. They enter and the cat puts up a sign reading, "2 minute intermission for a short beer". When they are done, the bird flips the sign to, "Here we go again!", and the chase continues.

They see a "SLOW" sign, and the chase continues with in slow-motion. They then pass a sign reading: "RESUME SPEED", and the chase goes returns to normal pace. The bird ducks behind a tree; but the cat continues, and crashes through a series of warning signs: "DEAD END", "CURVE AHEAD", "STOP", "DETOUR", "BRIDGE OUT", and "ROAD CLOSED". Having fallen off a cliff into a body of water, the cat finds a road sign reading: "HOW DID YOU GET WAY DOWN HERE".

From his hole, the worm pokes out a stick with his hat on top (he has done this throughout the cartoon) to check the general safety of the area. The bird is sitting on the stick; and another chase begins. At one moment, the worm stops and asks the bird, "Are you following me?" The bird loudly replies, "YEAH!" "That's what I thought," says the worm.

As they approach the worm's home, the bird gets ahead and covers it with a rock. He then paints a fake hole a few inches away. To his surprise, the worm successfully jumps in; he then shows himself long enough to say, "I fooled ya!" When the bird attempts to repeat the worm's feat, he naturally hits the hard ground. The worm jumps out of the fake hole and dives into a lake. The bird "lifts" the water as though it were a rug, from beneath which the cat materializes. The bird runs, pursued by the cat.

The worm, standing in the road on which the bird and cat are running, holds up a sign reading "DETOUR". They veer to the right, and run off a cliff. Upon witnessing their fall, and hearing them hit the ground, the worm produces a bugle, plays a small portion of "Taps", then breaks into a jazz riff.

Heading home, the worm expresses sorrow at the apparent death of the cat but, as he eases into his hole he says, "Oh well, at least I finally got rid of that darned old early bird." He then ducks down and right away the bird comes up. He swallows, obviously having eaten the worm and wearing his bowler hat. He struts off, passing behind a tree. The cat is then seen, licking his chops and hiccupping, having obviously eaten the bird and also wearing the bowler hat the bird was wearing just earlier. He shows a sign reading: "Sad ending ain't it?"

== Voice Cast ==
All voices are uncredited:

- Kent Rogers as the Worm (impersonating Lou Costello)
- Frank Graham as the Bird
  - Kent Rogers as the Bird's muzzled nosies
- Tex Avery as the Cat

== Credits ==
- Director: Tex Avery
- Story: Rich Hogan
- Animation: Irven Spence, Preston Blair, Ed Love, Ray Abrams
- Music: Scott Bradley
- Producer: Fred Quimby

== See also ==
- Fair and Worm-er, a Warner Bros. cartoon directed by Chuck Jones with a similar plot.
