= Peace on Earth (film) =

1939 film by Hugh Harman

- Title card
- Directed by: Hugh Harman
- Produced by: Hugh Harman; Fred Quimby (uncredited)
- Starring: Mel Blanc; Martha Wentworth; Shirley Reed; Jeanne Dunne; The Hollywood Choir Boys (all uncredited)
- Music by: Scott Bradley
- Production company: Metro-Goldwyn-Mayer
- Distributed by: Loew's, Inc.
- Release date: December 9, 1939
- Running time: 9 minutes
- Country: United States
- Language: English

Peace on Earth is a 1939 American animated anti-war drama short film directed by Hugh Harman. It tells the story of a post-apocalyptic world populated only by animals, after human beings have gone extinct due to war. A critical and commercial success and considered to be one of the greatest cartoons of all time, it was nominated for the Nobel Peace Prize and the 1939 Academy Award for Short Subjects (Cartoons), losing the latter honor to Walt Disney Productions' Silly Symphony The Ugly Duckling.

== Plot ==
On Christmas Eve, a grandfather squirrel visits his two young grandchildren, who ask him who the "men" are in the phrase "Peace on Earth, good will to men." He recalls that men went extinct when he was a young child. Through flashbacks, he remembers them only as "monsters" wearing "great, big iron pots on their heads" (helmets), "walked on their hind legs" (bipedalism), carrying "terrible-looking shootin'-irons with knives on the end of them" (bayonets), whose "eyes flashed" (goggles), and had "these tremendous big snoots (snouts), like this, that curled down and fastened onto their stomachs" (gas masks). Always going to war, finding an increasingly frivolous thing to fight over as soon as another was settled, they fight in scenes of devastation reminiscent of World War I until there are only two left. Each fatally shoots the other, and the last sight of a man is a hand curling into a fist as it slips under in a watery foxhole.

Animals — among them the young squirrel who would later become the grandfather — come out of hiding to find a Bible open to "Thou shalt not kill." An owl reads the words, taking it to be a good rulebook that men ignored. The owl finds “Ye shall rebuild the old wastes” (paraphrasing Isaiah 58:12 and 61:4). The animals agree, using men’s devices of war to build the town of Peaceville. There, in the present day, the grandchildren have fallen asleep, as their mother tucks them in.

Throughout the film, a Christmas carol of young rabbits and a squirrel, using the melody of "Hark! The Herald Angels Sing," is featured with altered lyrics emphasizing "peace on Earth, good will to men."

== Voice cast ==
- Mel Blanc as Grandfather Squirrel (uncredited)
- Shirley Reed and Jeannie Dunne as The Two Child Squirrels (uncredited)
- Martha Wentworth as Mother Squirrel singing Silent Night at the end (uncredited)
- The Hollywood Choir Boys as The Young Animal Christmas carolers led by Hal Crane (uncredited)

== Accolades ==
According to Harman, Fred Quimby disliked the film until it proved to be commercially successful. Harman attempted to follow it up with an adaptation of Thomas Gray's poem "Elegy Written in a Country Churchyard", but Quimby and the animators trashed all production materials and cancelled it when it was half complete out of spite. Harman considers it to be one of his best cartoons, with it being one in three cartoons he did not disown.

According to Hugh Harman's obituary in The New York Times and Ben Mankiewicz, host of Cartoon Alley, the cartoon was nominated for a Nobel Peace Prize. However, it is not listed in the official Nobel Prize nomination database. According to filmmaker and animation historian Greg Ford, the cartoon was actually nominated for a Nobel Peace Prize, but neither won nor lost, since the Nobel Prizes were called off that year (ironically) due to the onset of World War II.

Mankiewicz also claimed that the cartoon was the first about a serious subject by a major studio. In 1994, it was voted #40 of the 50 Greatest Cartoons of all time by members of the animation field.

It was also nominated for the 1939 Academy Award for Short Subjects (Cartoons). It did not claim that honor (which instead went to Walt Disney's Silly Symphony The Ugly Duckling).

== Remake ==
Good Will to Men
- Directed by: William Hanna; Joseph Barbera
- Story by: William Hanna; Joseph Barbera
- Produced by: Fred Quimby; William Hanna; Joseph Barbera
- Starring: Elmore Vincent; Sandy Descher; June Foray; Mitchell Boys Choir
- Music by: Scott Bradley
- Animation by: Lewis Marshall; Kenneth Muse; Ed Barge; Irvin Spence; Reuben Timmins
- Layouts by: Dick Bickenbach
- Backgrounds by: Robert Gentle; Don Driscoll
- Color process: Technicolor
- Production company: Metro-Goldwyn-Mayer
- Distributed by: Loew's, Inc.
- Release date: December 23, 1955
- Running time: 9 minutes
- Country: United States
- Language: English

William Hanna and Joseph Barbera directed a remake of the cartoon in CinemaScope in 1955. This post-World War II version of the film, entitled Good Will to Men, is narrated by a deacon mouse who tells the story to a choir of mice preparing for a Christmas service. Good Will to Men featured updated and even more destructive forms of warfare technology such as flamethrowers, bazookas and missiles, and instead of the final battle being man-to-man, humanity is driven to extinction by a mutually assured nuclear holocaust. This version did not explain why humans were constantly at war, only that the deacon believed they were eager to kill each other for killing's sake; it also does not reference the line of rebuilding, instead quoting love your neighbor as yourself as the foundation for society's future. This new version was also nominated for the Best Animated Short Subject Oscar, but lost to Speedy Gonzales. This film was the last animated production for producer Fred Quimby before his retirement in May 1955.

=== Voice Cast ===
- Elmore Vincent as The Old Choir Master Mouse (uncredited)
- Sandy Descher as The Child Mice (uncredited)
- June Foray as The Old Lady Mouse and The Old Lady Rabbit saying "Merry Christmas" to each other at the end (uncredited)
- Eight boys from the Mitchell Boys Chior singing Hark! The Herald Angels Sing (uncredited)

== Home media ==
Both Peace on Earth and Good Will to Men are included, digitally restored and uncut, on the Warner Bros. Home Entertainment Academy Awards Animation Collection DVD set.

Peace on Earth is also included as an extra on the A Christmas Carol DVD and Blu-ray from Warner Home Video and The Mortal Storm Blu-ray by Warner Archive Collection.

In 2025, Good Will to Men was included as a bonus short (restored in HD) on both the Tom and Jerry: The Complete CinemaScope Collection and Tom and Jerry: The Golden Era Anthology Blu-Ray sets from Warner Archive.

== See also ==
- List of Christmas films
