= Northwest Hounded Police =

- Directed by: Tex Avery
- Story by: Heck Allen
- Produced by: Fred Quimby
- Starring: Tex Avery; Frank Graham; William Hanna
- Music by: Scott Bradley
- Animation by: Walter Clinton; Ed Love; Ray Abrams; Preston Blair; Al Grandmain (effects animation, uncredited)
- Layouts by: Claude Smith
- Backgrounds by: John Didrik Johnsen
- Production company: MGM cartoon studio
- Distributed by: Metro-Goldwyn-Mayer
- Release date: August 3, 1946
- Running time: 7:30
- Country: United States
- Language: English

Northwest Hounded Police is a 1946 American animated short film directed by Tex Avery, produced by Fred Quimby, and featuring Droopy and Avery's wolf character. A remake of Droopy's first cartoon Dumb-Hounded (also adopting elements from Avery's 1941 Bugs Bunny cartoon Tortoise Beats Hare), the short revolves around the wolf (an escaped criminal) on the run from Droopy, who is trailing the wolf in order to capture him. The title is a play on words on the film North West Mounted Police (1940).

== Plot ==
The film opens with a view of "Alka-Fizz Prison", a parody of Alcatraz. The sign over the gate informs viewers that "No Noose is Good Noose", a pun involving the phrase "no news is good news" and the use of the noose in executions. The Wolf, portrayed as an imprisoned convict, uses a pencil to draw a "crude door on the wall outside his cell", then opens that door and escapes, making his way from the United States to Canada.

The scene shifts to the Royal Canadian Mounted Police headquarters of Mounty County. The chief addresses the whole squad of Mounties, seeking a volunteer who is willing to catch the escaped convict. Sgt. McPoodle (Droopy) is effectively volunteered when all the other Mounties step back to reveal him. Meanwhile out in the Yukon wilderness, the Wolf is tramping through the snow and stops to read a series of Burma-Shave-style signs which contain a warning message for him: "Don't Look Now/ Use Your Noodle/ You're Being Followed/ by Sgt. McPoodle". He turns around, and the camera shifts left to reveal that McPoodle is indeed riding up behind him. This sets the pace for most of the short, where the shifting perspective of the camera exposes the presence of Droopy from one location to the next.

Clearly frightened, the Wolf proceeds to run until he reaches in a seemingly vacant cabin at the foot of a mountain. He shuts a whole set of doors at the front and locks them, but then the camera shifts to reveal the presence of McPoodle, who sits in an armchair calmly reading a comic strip. The Wolf panics and re-opens the set of doors, only to find McPoodle waiting in the doorway. The Wolf bursts out through the back door, though he finds McPoodle also standing behind that door.

The Wolf climbs up the mountain and finds refuge in its summit, within a large bird nest occupied by only a large egg. When the Wolf declares that he will never be found in this place, the egg then cracks and McPoodle emerges from inside. The Wolf immediately dives into the lake below, he feels momentarily safe underwater, until he notices McPoodle among the schooling fish. After discovering McPoodle the driver seat of a Taxi he takes to the airport; followed by his accompaniment in the airplane he tries to escape in, the Wolf ends up on a tiny atoll in the middle of the ocean with only two rocks on its surface. The Wolf remarks to the audience, that he has caught on to the pattern and fully expects the Mountie to emerge from under the larger rock. At this point, McPoodle surprises him by appearing from under the smaller rock instead.

The Wolf throws a brief childish tantrum and proceeds to swim all the way to New York City. He runs in the streets of the City, and an accidental turn causes him to nearly run off the edge of the film, he saves himself and then seeks refuge in a movie theater, hiding among the audience. An MGM cartoon starts in which McPoodle appears greets him from the screen, causing the Wolf to again flee. The Wolf next seeks the services of a plastic surgeon and requests a new face. After a rapid procedure, he finds his new face to be a replica of McPoodle's and begs the surgeon to restore his original face. Then he thanks the surgeon for doing so, only to notice that the man's face has also changed to now look like McPoodle.

An increasingly desperate Wolf next attempts to feed himself to a lion in the local zoo, but inside belly of the beast, he finds himself sharing the space with McPoodle. He jumps back out of the lion's mouth and runs to a hotel, but when he hides in one of its rooms, it turns out to be a prison cell. The Wolf speaks to the audience again, realizing that he has been caught, but now that he has some time to recall the events of the pursuit: "I wonder if there coulda been more than one o' them little guys". At this point, the camera shifts to the hallway where hundreds of McPoodles have gathered. They respond in unision to his question with "'What do you think, brother?"

== Voice cast ==
- Frank Graham as The Wolf, RCMP Chief, Dr. Putty-Puss
  - William Hanna as Wolf's screams (re-used audio from the Tom and Jerry cartoons)
- Tex Avery as Sergeant Droopy McPoodle

== Production ==
Jeff Lenburg comments that one of the animators of the film was Preston Blair, who produced some of his best work while working under Tex Avery, including this film. He cites as other examples Red Hot Riding Hood (1943), Screwball Squirrel (1944), Batty Baseball (1944), The Shooting of Dan McGoo (1945), Lonesome Lenny (1946), and Red Hot Rangers (1947). His work under Avery ended in 1948, when Fred Quimby promoted Blair to a director in his own right. He and co-director Michael Lah worked on three films for the Barney Bear series, before Quimby decided to discontinue their production unit. In reaction, Blair left the Metro-Goldwyn-Mayer cartoon studio and started working for Terrytoons.

Bill Thompson, the regular voice of Droopy, did not do the character's voice in this cartoon; Tex Avery provided the voice, instead.

== Analysis ==
The main humor of the film derives from Droopy inexplicably appearing wherever the Wolf goes, granting the character omnipresence. This was only the fourth film to feature Droopy, but it is essentially a remake of the first of them, Dumb-Hounded (1943). Both films actually recycle the gag of the seemingly omnipresent character from an even earlier film, Tortoise Beats Hare (1941). In that film, Cecil Turtle enlists his look-alike relatives to beat Bugs Bunny in a race.

The warning signs hint at two of the main themes of the film. One is the thin line between visibility and invisibility, the other is the sense that the pursuit of the officer is both relentless and inescapable. Scott Curtis argues that the film can be seen as a very sad comment on the lives of the animators themselves. The Wolf finds a way to escape through the power of his drawing pencil, suggesting emancipation through an artist's talent and creativity. But that promise of freedom is soon revealed as an illusion. In Curtis' view Avery and his crew had found themselves in a similar trap, having to draw hundreds of drawings of Droopy for every one of his films, to the point the character became a dominating presence in their lives.

Derek Hayes and Chris Webster cite Northwest Hounded Police as an example of an animated film where the empathy of the audience is reserved for the nominal villain, the Wolf. Because the audience can relate to his human-like frustrations, while Droopy here serves the role of a "boring hero". They define this type of hero as one seemingly flawless and invulnerable, effectively having nothing in common with the audience. Making it unlikely for them to identify with the hero, or feel empathy for him/her. They also argue that Droopy himself was never given a developed personality in his films, leaving the role of the real protagonist to whatever character shares the screen with him.

Jean-Marc Limoges cites the scene set in the movie theater as an example of Avery using metalepsis in his films. The Wolf among the film audience is greeted by Droopy (McPoodle) from the movie screen. Not only allowing the presence of a film within a film, but allowing the two films to interact.

== Reception ==
In 1994, animation historian Jerry Beck published The 50 Greatest Cartoons, selecting and ranking animated short films according to a poll of 1,000 people working in the animation industry. Northwest Hounded Police was ranked 28th in the list. The only shorts directed by Avery which were ranked higher were Red Hot Riding Hood (1943, ranked 7th), King-Size Canary (1947, ranked 10th), Bad Luck Blackie (1949, ranked 15th), and Little Rural Riding Hood (1949, ranked 23rd).

In 1999, the Cartoon Network published its own list of Greatest 50 Cartoons. Northwest Hounded Police was ranked 27th. The only animated shorts directed by Avery which were ranked higher were I Love to Singa (1936, ranked 8th), King-Size Canary (1947, ranked 13th), Red Hot Riding Hood (1943, ranked 14th), Bad Luck Blackie (1949, ranked 15th), Ventriloquist Cat (1950, ranked 19th), Little Rural Riding Hood (1949, ranked 22nd), and A Wild Hare (1940, ranked 24th).

== Sources ==
- Curtis, Scott (2011), "Tex Avery's Prison House of Animation, or Humor and Boredom in Studio Cartoons", in Goldmark, Daniel; Keil, Charlie (eds.), Funny Pictures: Animation and Comedy in Studio-Era Hollywood, University of California Press, ISBN 978-0520950122
- Hayes, Derek; Webster, Chris (2013), "Principles of Performance", Acting and Performance for Animation, Taylor & Francis, ISBN 978-0240812397
- Lenburg, Jeff (2006), "Blair, Preston", Who's who in Animated Cartoons: An International Guide to Film & Television's Award-winning and Legendary Animators, Hal Leonard Corporation, ISBN 978-1617746604
- Limoges, Jean-Marc (2011), "Metalepsis in the Cartoons of Tex Avery: Expanding the Boundaries of Transgression", in Kukkonen, Karin; Klimek, Sonja (eds.), Metalepsis in Popular Culture, Walter de Gruyter GmbH, ISBN 978-3110252781
- Mittell, Jason (2004), "Appendix", Genre and Television: From Cop Shows to Cartoons in American Culture, Routledge, ISBN 978-1135458768
- Shull, Michael S.; Wilt, David E. (2004), "Filmography 1943", Doing Their Bit: Wartime American Animated Short Films, 1939–1945, McFarland & Company, ISBN 978-0786481699
