= Little Johnny Jet =

1953 American cartoon short film

- Directed by: Tex Avery
- Written by: Heck Allen
- Produced by: Fred Quimby
- Starring: Daws Butler; Colleen Collins
- Music by: Scott Bradley
- Animation by: Walter Clinton; Grant Simmons; Michael Lah; Ray Patterson; Robert Bentley
- Color process: Technicolor
- Production company: MGM cartoon studio
- Distributed by: Metro-Goldwyn-Mayer
- Release date: April 18, 1953
- Running time: 7 minutes
- Country: United States
- Language: English

Little Johnny Jet is a 1953 Metro-Goldwyn-Mayer cartoon studio cartoon short directed by Tex Avery about a "family" of airplanes. The title is a play on Little Johnny Jones. The screenplay was written by Heck Allen. The film score was composed by Scott Bradley. The film was produced by Fred Quimby. It was nominated for the Academy Award for Best Animated Short Film but lost to the Tom and Jerry short Johann Mouse (another MGM Cartoon).

== Synopsis ==
The cartoon follows the story of a B-29 bomber named John (voiced by Daws Butler), who is married to a Douglas DC-3 named Mary (voiced by Colleen Collins). Despite being a veteran, he has been unable to find work lately because all the airports are looking for jets. His need for finding work increases upon learning Mary is going to have a baby, so John goes to try reenlisting in the Air Force. Unfortunately the Air Force refuses his job application, as they are looking for jets as well, which further angers him. On his way home, Junior finally arrives, (via a stork-helicopter) and so John is overcome with happiness, until it turns out that Junior is a jet as well. John loses his mind.

When reading the paper, the next day, the Hot Air News, John sees the ad for a jet contest held by the United States Government where the winner gets a huge contract. Plenty fed up with jets, he goes to enter the contest as well to try to show them up. Realizing the risk that her husband is putting himself, Mary (with Junior in tow) goes after John. En route to the contest, John meets a B-29 general who smokes Douglas MacArthur's trademark corncob pipe and has Bataan written amidst his five stars. When John asks him, the general declines to enter the contest and states, parodying MacArthur's farewell address to the U.S. Congress, that "older planes never fly, they just fade away," before literally fading away.

At the contest, John lines up at the starting line with the rest of the jets. Mary and Junior catch up to him and Mary tries convincing John not to go through with the race, but John refuses to listen to her. While this was happening, Junior gets out of the baby buggy and gets in the fuselage of John, and by the time Mary realizes that her son is there, it is too late.

At the green flag, the jets all but disappear while John, in comparison, sputters badly to take off and run the race. Within no time, his engines simply detach themselves from his body and fly away on their own, sending him into a nosedive for Earth. Junior realizes what is happening and after a brief struggle with the door, manages to get out of him in time to grab him by the tail and save him. When John notices that he has not crashed, he looks back and sees his son holding his tail and flying him along. After happily praising him for saving him, they then kick into high gear and run the race, tearing past the other contestants (freaking them out in the process), and fly around the world, going by certain landmarks with funny things happening (the Eiffel Tower pulling itself open long enough to let them through, the Leaning Tower of Pisa tilting the other way, the Sphinx's top shaven off to reveal a bald head, they fly by a huge cloud of smog which is completely removed to reveal Los Angeles, the Statue of Liberty's dress blows open to reveal then-rather risqué lingerie on it (leaving Junior perplexed), etc.), and a few non-landmark things as well (a blimp gets cut in half to look like a watermelon, a sky-written ad for a cola changes to read "BURP!", an ocean liner gets shrunk down to a tugboat, and a rainbow literally tied up like a bow, etc.).

They easily win the race and the government contract for Junior. While John is happy for his son, he is shocked when the government tells him they need ten thousand more just like him—John realizes that he and Mary have some serious procreating to do, though Mary turns out to be mentally prepared.

== Voice Cast ==
- Daws Butler as John Jet / The Recruitment Officer / The Douglas MacArthur Plane / The Senior Army Officer
- Colleen Collins as Mary Jet

== See also ==
- One Cab's Family
