= The Cat Concerto =

1947 Tom and Jerry short film

- Original theatrical poster
- Directed by: William Hanna; Joseph Barbera
- Produced by: Fred Quimby
- Cinematography: Jack Stevens
- Edited by: Fred McAlpin
- Music by: Scott Bradley; Jakob Gimpel (piano solo); Calvin Jackson (piano solo, uncredited)
- Animation by: Kenneth Muse; Ed Barge; Irven Spence
- Backgrounds by: Robert Gentle
- Color process: Technicolor
- Production company: MGM Cartoons
- Distributed by: Metro-Goldwyn-Mayer
- Release date: April 26, 1947
- Running time: 7 minutes
- Country: United States
- Language: No dialogue

The Cat Concerto is a 1947 American animated cartoon and a Tom and Jerry short. It was released to theaters by Metro-Goldwyn-Mayer under their cartoon division on April 26, 1947. The short film centers on Tom's attempts to perform Franz Liszt's Hungarian Rhapsody No. 2 on the piano as Jerry constantly disrupts the performance, leading to an escalation of slapstick antics. The short film was produced by Fred Quimby and directed by William Hanna and Joseph Barbera, with musical supervision by Scott Bradley, and animation by Kenneth Muse, Ed Barge, and Irven Spence.

The Cat Concerto faced a plagiarism dispute with Warner Bros. cartoon Rhapsody Rabbit (1946), as it featured both Tom and Bugs Bunny fighting against a mouse, similar slapstick gags, and the same composition by Liszt. Despite the dispute, the short film won Best Animated Short Subject at the 19th Academy Awards, which served as the fourth consecutive Tom and Jerry film to win an Oscar. Its classical approach would influence the subsequent short films The Hollywood Bowl (1950) and Johann Mouse (1953). Retrospectively, The Cat Concerto was ranked at number 42 on The 50 Greatest Cartoons (1994), praising its slapstick violence in connection to the background music. Additionally, the short film influenced Chinese pianist Lang Lang, who considered it to have started his interest in playing the piano.

== Plot ==
A 30-second excerpt of The Cat Concerto

At a formal concert, Tom plays Franz Liszt's Hungarian Rhapsody No. 2 on the piano. Jerry, who lives inside the piano, disrupts Tom's performance by mock-conducting him. Tom flicks Jerry away and continues playing. Jerry emerges from under the piano keys, and Tom tries unsuccessfully to hit him with the key and smash him. Jerry manipulates the piano's keys from inside, irritating Tom, who hits him with a tuning tool. In retaliation, Jerry slams the keyboard lid on Tom's fingers and tries to cut his finger with scissors. After several failed attempts, Jerry sets a mousetrap, catching Tom's finger.

Tom climbs onto the piano to chase Jerry, playing with his feet. Jerry dances on the felts, briefly changing the tune to "On the Atchison, Topeka and the Santa Fe". Tom bounces Jerry with a chord, eventually catching him and throwing him onto the piano stool. Jerry manipulates the seat controls, sending Tom crashing into the keys. Tom, fed up, stuffs Jerry into the piano felts and plays frantically on the piano. The felts bash Jerry around, but he emerges angry and retaliates by playing the rhapsody's finale with felts as drumsticks, causing Tom to collapse in exhaustion. The audience applauds, and Jerry takes credit for the performance as a spotlight shines on him.

== Background and production ==
In 1939, animator William Hanna and writer Joseph Barbera from MGM's cartoon division began working together to create a mouse-and-cat cartoon titled Puss Gets the Boot (1940), which received critical and popular acclaim along with an Academy Award nomination. The short film evolved into Tom and Jerry, which quickly became the most popular cartoon characters from MGM's cartoon division.

The Cat Concerto was directed by Hanna and Barbera, produced by Fred Quimby, and edited by Fred MacAlpin. It additionally features animation from Kenneth Muse, Ed Barge, and Irven Spence, set design from Robert Gentle, music from Scott Bradley, piano from Jakob Gimpel, and photography from Jack Stevens. The short film's production number is #165. For its use of music, Franz Liszt's Hungarian Rhapsody No. 2 is prominently featured. The Cat Concerto is considered to be the first Tom and Jerry short film to feature Tom in a human role, in which his piano playing was primarily animated by Muse. The short film is presented as a parody of the "rituals and pretensions of classical music concerts", combining satire and slapstick humor. During a scene where Jerry takes control over the piano, he plays "On the Atchison, Topeka, and the Santa Fe", which was a hit song from MGM at the time.

=== Plagiarism dispute ===
In the same year that MGM produced The Cat Concerto, Warner Bros. released a similar cartoon titled Rhapsody Rabbit (1946), directed by Friz Freleng and featuring Bugs Bunny facing off against an unnamed mouse. Both cartoons shared nearly identical gags and featured the same piece by Franz Liszt. In 1999, Michael Mallory interviewed Barbera about the process of The Cat Concerto, in which he considered the idea of "having the cat play the piano" as fascinating. He revealed that during a screening for the Oscar nominees, The Cat Concerto played first, which received an enthusiastic response from the audience, making Freleng "mad as hell." Rhapsody Rabbit followed, which featured similarities to the previous short film and led viewers to believe Freleng had plagiarized The Cat Concerto.

== Release and reception ==
On March 13, 1947, The Cat Concerto was qualified for and won Best Animated Short Subject at the 19th Academy Awards; the title card was modified on time to display its status as the winner. It served as the fourth consecutive Tom and Jerry film to win an Oscar. The short film was officially released on April 26 by MGM under their cartoon division. Following its release, The Cat Concerto was met with critical acclaim and is retrospectively considered one of the best Tom and Jerry cartoons. The day after the short film's Oscar preview, a Deseret News writer described The Cat Concerto as a "performance that has to be seen and heard to be believed." Hanna and Barbera later made the similar short film The Hollywood Bowl (1950), which seemingly inspired Chuck Jones's Baton Bunny (1959), and approached classical music again on Johann Mouse (1953).

In 1994, The Cat Concerto was ranked at number 42 on the book The 50 Greatest Cartoons, authored by Jerry Beck. Will Friedwald reviewed the short film on the book, in which he considered Tom and Jerry's comic violence in background of Liszt's Hungarian Rhapsody No. 2, as parodying not only the "hoity-toity manner of the concert virtuoso but the hammers and strings of the piano itself." Sam Scott of Looper included The Cat Concerto as one of "the best Tom and Jerry cartoons to stream right now" in 2021, praising the short film's character animation as it features "Tom's unprovoked spitefulness and Jerry's infectious joy". The short film was subsequently influential to Chinese pianist Lang Lang. He revealed that his first exposure to classical music was The Cat Concerto, which inspired his passion for piano with the desire to "play as fast as that cat could." In 2017, teenage pianist Yannie Tan performed a rendition of the short film's music, which received over eight million views on YouTube by the following year.

== Home video appearances ==
=== DVD ===
- Tom and Jerry's Greatest Chases (2000)
- Tom and Jerry Spotlight Collection Volume 1, Disc 1 (2004)
- Tom and Jerry: The Deluxe Anniversary Collection, Disc 1 (2010)
- Tom and Jerry Golden Collection Volume 1, Disc 2 (2011)
- Tom and Jerry: The Golden Era Anthology, Disc 2 (2025)

=== Blu-ray ===
- Tom and Jerry Golden Collection Volume 1, Disc 2 (2011)
- Tom and Jerry: The Golden Era Anthology, Disc 2 (2025)

== Works cited ==
- Adams, T. R. (1991). Tom and Jerry: Fifty Years of Cat and Mouse. Crescent Books. ISBN 185510086X.
- Beck, Jerry (1994). The 50 Greatest Cartoons: As Selected by 1,000 Animation Professionals. Turner Publishing. ISBN 187868549X.
- Goldmark, Daniel; Taylor, Yuval, eds. (2002). The Cartoon Music Book. Chicago Review Press. ISBN 1569764115.
- Sennett, Ted (1989). The Art of Hanna-Barbera: Fifty Years of Creativity. Viking Studio Books. ISBN 0670829781.
- Webb, Graham (2011). The Animated Film Encyclopedia: A Complete Guide to American Shorts, Features and Sequences, 1900-1999 (2nd ed.). McFarland & Company. ISBN 0786449853.
