= Heck Allen =

American author and screenwriter (1912 –1991)

- Born: September 29, 1912; Kansas City, Missouri, U.S.
- Died: October 26, 1991 (aged 79); Van Nuys, California, U.S.
- Occupations: Writer, screenwriter
- Relatives: Robert Allen (brother)
- Writing career
- Genres: Western fiction Animation

Henry Wilson "Heck" Allen (September 29, 1912 – October 26, 1991) was an American author of historical fiction and a screenwriter. He used several different pseudonyms for his works. His 50+ novels of the American West were published under the pen names Will Henry and Clay Fisher. Allen's screenplays and scripts for animated shorts were credited to Heck Allen and Henry Allen.

== Biography ==
Allen was born in Kansas City, Missouri. Before he began his writing career he worked variously as a stablehand, shop clerk, and gold miner.

In 1937 he began working as a contract screenwriter for the Metro-Goldwyn-Mayer cartoon department, where his brother Robert worked as an animator and director. While his early work was for Rudolf Ising's Barney Bear series, his longest collaboration was with director Tex Avery. Allen was credited as story artist on many classic Avery shorts, included Swing Shift Cinderella, Northwest Hounded Police, and King-Size Canary, among many others, after Avery's screenwriter Rich Hogan was drafted into the army. Allen downplayed his contributions to the shorts, claiming that Avery merely used him as a sounding board for his own ideas. He was fired by Fred Quimby after Hogan returned to the studio and went to work for Walter Lantz Productions on several Woody Woodpecker cartoons that he co-wrote with Ben Hardaway including Wet Blanket Policy and Wild and Woody!. Following the 1948 shutdown of Walter Lantz Productions, Allen returned to MGM and continued to write for Avery's cartoons that were released during the 1950s including Little Johnny Jet, The Three Little Pups, and The First Bad Man.

Allen's career as a novelist began in 1950, with the publication of his first Western No Survivors. Allen, afraid that the studio would disapprove of his moonlighting, used a pen-name to avoid trouble. He would go on to publish over 50 novels, eight of which were adapted for the screen. Most of these were published under one or the other of the pseudonyms Will Henry and Clay Fisher. Allen was a five-time winner of the Spur Award from the Western Writers of America and a recipient of the Levi Strauss Award for lifetime achievement.

Allen died of pneumonia on October 26, 1991, in Van Nuys, California. He was 79 years old.

== Partial bibliography ==
- No Survivors, 1950
- "Red Blizzard", 1951
- "Wolf-Eye, The Bad One", 1951 (For Children)
- Santa Fe Passage, 1952 ("Santa Fe Passage", filmed in 1955)
- "To Follow a Flag", 1953 (republished as "Pillars of the Sky"), ("Pillars of the Sky", filmed in 1956)
- "War Bonnet", 1953
- "Yellow Hair", 1953
- Death of a Legend, 1954 (republished as "The Raiders")
- "The Fourth Horseman", 1954
- The Tall Men, 1954 (The Tall Men, filmed in 1955)
- The Big Pasture, 1955
- The Brass Command, 1955
- Who Rides with Wyatt, 1955 (Young Billy Young, filmed in 1969)
- Red Brother and White, 1955
- The Blue Mustang, 1956
- The North Star, 1956 (republished as "Blind Cañon") (filmed as Tashunga (also released as The North Star), 1996)
- The Texas Rangers, 1957 (For Children)
- Yellowstone Kelly, 1957 (Yellowstone Kelly, filmed in 1959)
- "The Seven Men at Mimbres Spring", 1958
- "The Crossing", 1958
- "Orphan of the North", 1958 (For Children)
- From Where the Sun Now Stands, 1960 (Spur Award Winner) (The Saddleman Award), 1961
- Journey to Shiloh, 1960 (Journey to Shiloh, filmed in 1968)
- "Nino: The Legend of Apache Kid", 1961
- "The Return of the Tall Man", 1961
- The Feleen Brand, 1962
- "San Juan Hill", 1962
- "The Pitchfork Patrol", 1962
- "The Gates of the Mountains", 1963 (Spur Award Winner)
- MacKenna's Gold, 1963 (Mackenna's Gold, filmed in 1969)
- "Valley of the Bear", 1964 (For Children)
- In the Land of the Mandans, 1965 (For Children)
- The Last Warpath, 1966
- Custer's Last Stand: The Story of the Battle of the Little Big Horn, 1966
- "Sons of the Western frontier", 1968
- "Genesis Five"
- One More River to Cross, 1967
- "Alias Butch Cassidy"
- "Maheo's Children: The Legend of Little Dried River", 1968 (republished as "The Squaw killers")
- "The Day Fort Larking Fell", 1968
- Genesis Five, 1968
- Outlaws and Legends, 1969
- "Tayopa!", 1968
- "See How They Run", 1970
- Starbuck, 1972
- Chiricahua, 1972 (Spur Award winner)
- "Outcasts of Canyon Creek"
- The Bear Paw Horses, 1973
- "Apache Ransom", 1974
- Sex and Pain, 1975
- I, Tom Horn, 1975
- "Black Apache" 1976
- From Where the Twilight Zone, 1976
- Summer of the Gun, 1978
- "Nine Lives West", 1978
- "Seven Card Stud", 1981
- The Legend of Sotoju Mountain, 2002
- Winter Shadows, 2003
- The Hunkpapa Scout, 2004
- The Scout, 2005
- Medicine Road, 2006
