= George and Junior =

- MGM Cartoons characters
- George (left) and Junior (right), seen in Red Hot Rangers
- First appearance: Henpecked Hoboes; (October 26, 1946; 80 years ago)
- Last appearance: George and Junior's Christmas Spectacular; July 23, 1995; 31 years ago
- Created by: Tex Avery
- Designed by: Irven Spence
- Voiced by: George: Dick Nelson (1946–1947); Wally Maher (1948); John Rubinow (1995); Benjamin Diskin (2019); Junior: Tex Avery (1946–1948); Tony Pope (1995); Stephen Stanton (2019)

In-universe information
- Species: Bears
- Gender: Male

George and Junior are cartoon characters, two anthropomorphic bears created by Tex Avery for Metro-Goldwyn-Mayer. All of the George and Junior shorts were directed by Avery in the 1940s. They appeared in four cartoons: Henpecked Hoboes (1946), Hound Hunters (1947), Red Hot Rangers (1947), and Half-Pint Pygmy (1948).

== History ==
The cartoons would usually follow the misadventures of two bears inspired by George and Lennie from John Steinbeck's Of Mice and Men: George, the short, short-tempered, intelligent one (voiced by Dick Nelson) and Junior, the tall, dim-witted, strong one (voiced by Tex Avery). George would usually come up with a plan to fix their current situation. Junior would accidentally mess it up somehow, then George would get angry and say "Bend over, Junior", and, when Junior does so, George delivers a hard kick to his rear end.

== Appearances ==
The characters' designs and voices were altered for their fourth appearance.

A gray-purple version of George made a brief headshot cameo during the final scene of the 1988 Disney/Amblin film Who Framed Roger Rabbit. The octopus from Half-Pint Pygmy also made a cameo as a bartender at The Ink and Paint Club. Junior was planned to have a cameo in the film, but was later dropped for unknown reasons. George and Junior were also planned to appear in the deleted scene of Marvin Acme's funeral alongside other famous cartoon characters, according to one of the storyboards of the scene. They would later make appearances in Dark Horse Comics with Tex Avery's Wolf and Red and Screwy Squirrel.

In 1995, George and Junior were featured in two segments of What a Cartoon!, respectively voiced by John Rubinow and Tony Pope.

Lucky Ducky was originally planned to feature George and Junior.

In 2019, both George and Junior make an appearance as zoo catchers in The Tom and Jerry Show episode "Shadow of a Doubt". They also make various cameos in some episodes of the series. George is voiced by Ben Diskin, while Junior is voiced by Stephen Stanton.

== Cartoons ==
#	Title	Release date
1	Henpecked Hoboes	October 26, 1946
2	Hound Hunters	April 12, 1947
3	Red Hot Rangers	May 3, 1947
4	Half-Pint Pygmy	August 7, 1948
5	Look Out Below	April 9, 1995
6	George and Junior's Christmas Spectacular	July 23, 1995

== Voice actors ==
- Dick Nelson (1946–1947, George)
- Tex Avery (1946–1948, Junior)
- Wally Maher (Half-Pint Pygmy, George)
- John Rubinow and Tony Pope (What a Cartoon!)
- Ben Diskin and Stephen Stanton (The Tom and Jerry Show)

== Comics ==
=== List of comics appearances ===
- Tex Avery's Screwball Squirrel #1 (plus Wolf and Red) (1995) (Dark Horse Comics)
- Tex Avery's Screwball Squirrel #3 (plus Wolf and Red) (1995) (Dark Horse Comics) (Junior only)
- Comics and Stories #2 Featuring Tex Avery's Screwball Squirrel (1996) (Dark Horse Comics)

== Home media ==
- Henpecked Hoboes is on the DVD of Till the Clouds Roll By
- Hound Hunters is on the DVD of Fiesta (1947)
- Red Hot Rangers is on the DVD of Tycoon (1947)

In 2020, Warner Archive released the cartoons Hound Hunters and Red Hot Rangers uncut and digitally restored as part of the Tex Avery Screwball Classics: Volume 1 Blu-Ray.

== See also ==
- Of Fox and Hounds
