= Blitz Wolf =

- Poster for Blitz Wolf
- Directed by: Tex Avery
- Story by: Rich Hogan
- Starring: Bill Thompson; Pinto Colvig; Frank Graham; Sara Berner; Kent Rogers (all uncredited)
- Music by: Scott Bradley
- Animation by: Ray Abrams; Irven Spence; Preston Blair; Ed Love
- Color process: Technicolor
- Production company: MGM Cartoons
- Distributed by: Metro-Goldwyn-Mayer
- Release date: August 22, 1942
- Running time: 10 minutes
- Language: English

Blitz Wolf is a 1942 American animated propaganda short film produced and distributed by Metro-Goldwyn-Mayer. A parody of the Three Little Pigs told via a World War II perspective, the short was directed by Tex Avery (in his first cartoon for MGM) and produced by Fred Quimby. It was nominated for the Academy Award for Best Short Subject: Cartoons but lost to Der Fuehrer's Face, another anti-Nazi World War II parody featuring Donald Duck.

== Plot ==
The plot is a parody of the Three Little Pigs, told from a Second World War anti-German propaganda perspective. In this cartoon, the danger is from Adolf Wolf (a caricature of Adolf Hitler), who is set on invading the pig's nation of Pigmania. The pig who built his house of stone, "Sergeant Pork" (an homage to Sergeant York, or the contemporary film about him), takes his precautions and outfits his house with defense machinery, but the two pigs who built their houses of straw and sticks claim they don't have to take precautions against the wolf because they signed a non-aggression pact with him.

Adolf Wolf invades Pigmania, despite the two pigs protesting that he signed a treaty with them. He destroys their houses, the straw house with "Der Mechanized Huffer Und Puffer" and the stick house with an artillery shell, forcing the pigs to take shelter in the third pig's house, prompting a battle between the two parties. Towards the end of the cartoon, Adolf Wolf is blown out of his bomber plane by the pigs' artillery shells, fired from their multi-barreled "secret weapon" and filled with Defense bonds, and plummets down to Earth followed by a bomb from his own plane, which promptly blows him to Hell upon impact. There he realizes he is dead and says: "Where am I? Have I been blown to... ?", whereupon a group of devils adds: "Ehhhh, it's a possibility!", in reference to a then well-known catchphrase by Artie Auerbach on the Al Pearce radio show.

== Credits ==
- Director: Tex Avery
- Story: Rich Hogan
- Animation: Ray Abrams, Irven Spence, Preston Blair, Ed Love
- Music: Scott Bradley

== Voice cast ==
- Bill Thompson as Adolf Wolf (uncredited)
- Pinto Colvig as Sgt. Pork (uncredited)
- Frank Graham as Narrator (uncredited)
- Sara Berner as Pigs (uncredited)
- Kent Rogers as Devils (uncredited)

== Cultural references ==
- This is Tex Avery's first cartoon at MGM, and also the first film at MGM for animator Ed Love. Love had arrived at MGM with Kenneth Muse just after the 1941 Disney animators' strike.
- The MGM lion, Tanner, roars to the tune of "Hold That Tiger", with 5 quick and short roars.
- Adolf Wolf, the antagonist of the cartoon, would serve as inspiration for Tex Avery's unnamed wolf, who would appear in other cartoons such as Red Hot Riding Hood and Northwest Hounded Police.
- Tex Avery would once again parody the story of the Three Little Pigs in One Ham's Family and The Three Little Pups.
- This short was widely available, uncut, on the MGM/UA video label's VHS release, Tex Avery's Screwball Classics, Vol. 4 and on the MGM/UA laserdisc collection The Compleat Tex Avery. A fully restored and uncut version is available on Academy Awards Animation Collection DVD set by Warner Home Video, and as a bonus feature (in standard definition) on Disc 3 of the Looney Tunes Platinum Collection: Volume 2 Blu-Ray set. The high definition version was later included on the Tex Avery Screwball Classics: Volume 3 Blu-Ray by Warner Archive Collection.
- As the cartoon begins, a card is shown that says, "The Auto Tires Used in This Photoplay Are Fictitious - And We Aint Kiddin' Brother!" This is a reference to the scarcity of consumer rubber in the U.S. due to its rationing for the war effort.
- A newspaper's subtitle reads, "Uncle Sam: If He Dood It, He Get a Whippin!" This is a reference to Red Skelton's radio-show character The Mean Widdle Kid, who often said, just before misbehaving, "If I dood it, I dit a whippin!"
- There is a reference to the Doolittle Raid by Jimmy Doolittle on Tokyo. When the bomb lands and destroys Tokyo, there is a sign "Doolittle Dood It!" coming out from the water. "Doolittle Dood It!" was an actual newspaper headline of the Los Angeles Herald Examiner.
- Pinto Colvig provides the voice of "Practical Pig", as he did in Disney's Three Little Pigs.
- Adolf Wolf's voice was provided by Bill Thompson, who would later voice Droopy. Droopy starred in his own adaptation of the story called The Three Little Pups.
- In the beginning, the two little pigs mockingly sing to Sergeant Pork: You're in the army now,/ You're not behind the plow,/ You're diggin' a ditch,/ [pause and motion freeze],/ You're in the army now! The pause was inserted to replace the line "You son of a bitch," which would be inappropriate for a film at the time. This is much similar to a gag in the Warner Bros. cartoon The Draft Horse.
- The wolf saying "Is that you, Myrt?" on the phone is a reference to the radio show Fibber McGee and Molly.
- Most of the scenery doesn't resemble World War II at all. The trenches and the pigs' uniforms resemble those of World War I.
- As the tanks arrive, one small tank has the line "Good Humor" written on its side and makes the sound of an ice cream truck. This is similar to a joke later used in Bugs Bunny Nips the Nips.
- A lone flame tank not spewing fire holds up a sign with the line 'I Don't Want to Set the World on Fire'. This is a reference to the highly popular 1941 song by that title.
- When the straw house is blown away, a sign says 'Gone with the Wind', referring to the 1939 film (with another smaller sign agreeing that this is a corny gag), which was also released by MGM.
- One of the pigs' artillery shells blasts the Wolf's tank into tin cans, a reference to the Allied Scrap Metal Drives of World War II.
- At one point, Sgt. Pork distracts incoming shellfire by holding up a copy of Esquire magazine's (unseen-by-the-audience) Petty Girl pin-up artwork by George Petty.

== Analysis ==
Out of 15 cartoon shorts released by the Metro-Goldwyn-Mayer cartoon studio in 1942, this was the only one to have World War II as its subject matter. Besides targeting Adolf Hitler, the short includes references to anti-Japanese sentiment in the United States.

The Wolf holds a sign inviting the audience to hiss at him, as nobody cares about their reaction. This breaks the fourth wall and reveals the character's contempt for the audience.

There is a mixed message regarding the characters. The Wolf is presented with humor, with enough panache to keep the audience interested in him. Conversely, Sergeant Pork is a humorless, stoic character, on a serious mission.

The MGM pressbook termed the short as pro-democracy propaganda. The two lazy pig brothers reject preparation for defense because of their non-aggression pact, an allusion to the Molotov–Ribbentrop Pact. Their brother Sgt. Pork is named after Sgt. Alvin C. York, a World War I hero who inspired the film Sergeant York (1941). He represents the attitude of preparing for war.

The Wolf violates a non-aggression pact to blow down the pigs' homes. The two lazy pigs become fugitives of war and seek asylum in their brother's fortified home, which demonstrates a sign: "No Japs allowed." The three pigs use a huge cannon to bomb Tokyo. The city is destroyed with the image of the Rising Sun Flag collapsing in the background, replaced by a sky with red, white and blue stripes.

During the showdown, the Wolf fires an artillery shell against the fortified house. Sgt. Pork in his trench reaches down for his copy of the Esquire magazine. The pig opens the magazine and shows the centerfold to the shell. The shell stops midflight and whistles in appreciation. It then retreats and instantly returns with ten other shells, who are accordingly fascinated by the image presented to them. They make catcalls and then fall down deactivated. The pinup here is used as more than a symbol for boosting morale; it exploits the male vulnerability of the enemy through eliciting erotic arousal. The shells stand in for their human operators.

In another scene where a weapon stands in for military personnel, Pork's cannon collapses exhausted. Its owner revives it through feeding it B-1 vitamins. (B1 helps the body generate energy.) The cannon stands erect again and begins blasting away all on its own. The label may reference the number system of military hardware like the Boeing B-17 Flying Fortress.

The Wolf utilizes a "Stinka Bomber PU". This is a parody of the German Stuka, a dive bomber used by the Luftwaffe. The shells that down the aircraft are filled with defense bonds. The cartoon concludes with two printed titles: "The End of Adolf" and "If you'll Buy a Stamp or Bond - We'll Skin That Skunk Across the Pond!"

According to Chuck Jones, Tex Avery was criticized by an MGM producer for being overly rough in his depiction of Hitler. The producer reminded Avery that the victor of the war was yet to be determined.

This cartoon has rarely been shown in the United States since World War II. However, it was shown on Cartoon Network's ToonHeads and TCM's Cartoon Alley with the word "Japs" airbrushed out from the "No Japs Allowed" sign, and the scene involving a missile hitting Tokyo cut (this edited version is also available on the Region 2 Tex Avery 5-disc DVD set).

== Availability ==
VHS

- Tex Avery's Screwball Classics 4

LaserDisc

- All This and Tex Avery Too!
- The Compleat Tex Avery

DVD

- Warner Bros. Home Entertainment Academy Awards Animation Collection: 15 Winners, 26 Nominees

Blu-ray

- Looney Tunes Platinum Collection: Volume 2, Disc 3
- Tex Avery Screwball Classics: Volume 3

== See also ==
- The Thrifty Pig (a 1941 short by Disney, also involving the Three Little Pigs against a Nazi wolf)
- List of World War II short films

== Sources ==
- Kakoudaki, Despina (2004), "Pinup:The American Secret Weapon in World War II", in Williams, Linda (ed.), Porn Studies, Duke University Press, ISBN 978-0822333128
- Shull, Michael S.; Wilt, David E. (2004), "All Out for Victory:1942", Doing Their Bit: Wartime American Animated Short Films, 1939-1945, McFarland & Company, ISBN 978-0786481699
- Shull, Michael S.; Wilt, David E. (2004), "Filmography 1942", Doing Their Bit: Wartime American Animated Short Films, 1939-1945, McFarland & Company, ISBN 978-0786481699
- Thompson, Mark; Phelps, Brian (2005), "Interview with Chuck Jones", in Furniss, Maureen (ed.), Chuck Jones: Conversations, University Press of Mississippi, ISBN 978-1578067299
