= The Yankee Doodle Mouse =

1943 film by directed by Joseph Barbera and William Hanna

- Theatrical poster
- Directed by: William Hanna; Joseph Barbera
- Story by: Cal Howard (uncredited)
- Produced by: Fred Quimby (uncredited on original issue)
- Starring: William Hanna (uncredited, unconfirmed)
- Music by: Scott Bradley
- Animation by: Irven Spence; Pete Burness; Kenneth Muse; George Gordon; Uncredited animators: Al Grandmain (effects animation); Barney Posner (assistant animation); Jack Zander
- Layouts by: Harvey Eisenberg (uncredited)
- Backgrounds by: Ernest Smythe (uncredited)
- Color process: Technicolor
- Production company: MGM cartoon studio
- Distributed by: Metro-Goldwyn-Mayer
- Release dates: June 26, 1943; June 24, 1950 (re-release)
- Running time: 7:28 (reissue version)
- Language: no spoken dialogue

The Yankee Doodle Mouse is a 1943 American one-reel animated cartoon in Technicolor. It is the eleventh Tom and Jerry short produced by Fred Quimby, and directed by William Hanna and Joseph Barbera, with musical supervision by Scott Bradley and animation by Irven Spence, Pete Burness, Kenneth Muse and George Gordon. Jack Zander was credited on the original print, but his credit was omitted in the 1950 reissue. It was released to theaters on June 26, 1943 by Metro-Goldwyn Mayer. The short features Tom the cat and Jerry the mouse chasing each other in a pseudo-warfare style, and makes numerous references to World War II technology such as jeeps and dive bombers, represented by clever uses of common household items. The Yankee Doodle Mouse won the 1943 Oscar for Best Animated Short Film, making it the first of seven Tom and Jerry cartoons to receive this distinction.

== Plot ==
Tom pursues Jerry through a cellar, but Jerry successfully dives into his mousehole. Tom peers into the hole, and Jerry launches a tomato from a mousetrap into his face. Jerry then climbs up the wall and grabs a handful of eggs from a carton, which is marked "hen-grenades." As Tom wipes the tomato off his face, he is promptly covered in egg, with one hit to the eye leaving the effect of him wearing a monocle. Jerry shoots off the corks from a champagne case, knocking Tom into a tub of water with only a pot to keep him afloat. The mouse promptly launches a brick from a spatula, sinking both the pot and Tom. A war communiqué message reads, "Sighted cat – sank same. Signed, Lt. Jerry Mouse."

Later, Tom approaches Jerry's mousehole with a cheese and a mallet in his hand, while Jerry uses a pipe as a makeshift periscope to observe; spotting this trap, Jerry instead opens the ironing board cupboard, sending the board crashing onto Tom's head. Jerry charges down the board on a jeep made from a cheese grater attached to a roller skate, tearing Tom's fur as he speeds past twice, after which the jeep crashes into a wall, sending a sack of flour tumbling down. Adapting quickly to the situation, Jerry grabs the sack and spreads a makeshift flour smokescreen, which blocks Tom's vision but not Jerry's. He smacks the nearly blind Tom in the rear with a board three times, but eventually Tom falls to the ground facing the mouse; Jerry slaps Tom a fourth time before the cat can do anything and then runs for it.

Tom, now wearing a bowl as an improvised helmet, throws a stick of dynamite towards Jerry, who immediately throws it back to Tom; this continues until Jerry performs reverse psychology by taking it from Tom, provoking the cat to steal it back and this new cycle to continue until Jerry leaves Tom to witlessly hold the stick, which explodes. Jerry jumps into a tea kettle to escape the cat's wrath, but Tom sees him and throws another firecracker into the kettle; Jerry panics, but the oxygen has run out and the mouse escapes through the spout with no explosion. The puzzled cat opens the kettle's lid and sticks his entire head in just as the firecracker goes off, making him like a sunflower (the sunflower gag was removed on Cartoon Network in the late 1990s and early 2000s due to the short’s blackface reference).

Continuing his attempts to defeat the mouse, Tom launches a Paper plane with a firecracker hidden on top, but Jerry blows it back beneath Tom, who barely spots the firecracker before it goes off and is again black in the face. Jerry then plants an enormous stick of dynamite behind Tom; the cat sees it and screams in terror until the cracker splits into successively smaller sticks, ending with a minuscule replica of the original firecracker. Tom laughs, believing this to be harmless, but the dynamite explodes powerfully.

Jerry then goes through a hole in a barrel and jumps into a makeshift plane fashioned from an egg carton (launched from a slingshot made from a rubber band). He drops a succession of light bulbs, one of which hits Tom's head, and a banana bomb, which hits Tom's face. Tom grabs a Roman candle and skillfully shoots down Jerry's now weaponless plane, piece by piece. Jerry uses a brassiere to parachute from the plane, but is again shot down by Tom. Jerry races into his mousehole to escape, but Tom pushes another Roman candle into the hole and fires off six shots.

The fireballs pursue Jerry through the mouse hole through the barrel going back and forth until he eventually he leads them into a hose, which he shoots like a machine gun into a barrel where Tom is hiding. The barrel explodes, leaving Tom riding the remaining parts of the barrel like a bicycle, which then crashes into the wall. Recovering, Tom fires a dart gun at Jerry, which hits him on the tail as he again attempts to dive into his mousehole.

Tom grabs Jerry and ties him to an ignited rocket. Jerry pretends to help himself be tied up, but tricks Tom into strapping his own hands to the rocket. Jerry emerges from the ropes, and Tom does not realize what has happened until Jerry waves at him. Tom fails to blow out the fuse, and the rocket shoots high into the sky and explodes. The explosion forms the Stars and Stripes. Jerry proudly salutes the flag, and a final war communiqué is displayed, which reads "SEND MORE CATS!" signed by Jerry.

== Voice cast ==
- No Voices, some vocal effects, possibly by William Hanna but unconfirmed

== Crew ==
- Directed by: William Hanna and Joseph Barbera
- Story: William Hanna, Joseph Barbera
- Animation: Irven Spence, Pete Burness, George Gordon, Kenneth Muse
- Additional Animation: Jack Zander
- Assistant Animation: Barney Posner
- Effects Animation: Al Grandmain, Stan Quackenbush
- Layout: Harvey Eisenberg
- Music: Scott Bradley
- Co-Producer: William Hanna
- Produced by: Fred Quimby

== Missing sequence ==
The short was reissued in 1950. A gag involving ration stamps was removed in the reissue print. In the sequence where Jerry hits Tom with a board four times, as Jerry attempts to run off, the sequence fades to black. In the original missing sequence, Tom follows him, only to get his head stuck in Jerry’s hole. Jerry then uses Tom’s tongue to lick a war bond stamp. The second war communique reads: "Enemy gets in a few good licks! Signed, Lt. Jerry Mouse".

== Availability ==
VHS

- Tom & Jerry's 50th Birthday Classics

Laserdisc

- Tom & Jerry Classics
- The Art of Tom & Jerry Vol. 1, Side 2

DVD

- Tom and Jerry Spotlight Collection Vol. 1, Disc 1 (2004)
- Tom and Jerry: The Deluxe Anniversary Collection Disc 1 (2010)
- Tom and Jerry Golden Collection Vol. 1, Disc 1 (2011)
- Tom and Jerry: The Golden Era Anthology Disc 1 (2025)

Blu-ray

- Tom and Jerry Golden Collection Vol. 1, Disc 1 (2020)
- Tom and Jerry: The Golden Era Anthology Disc 1 (2025)
