= He Done Her Wrong =

Graphic novel by Milt Gross

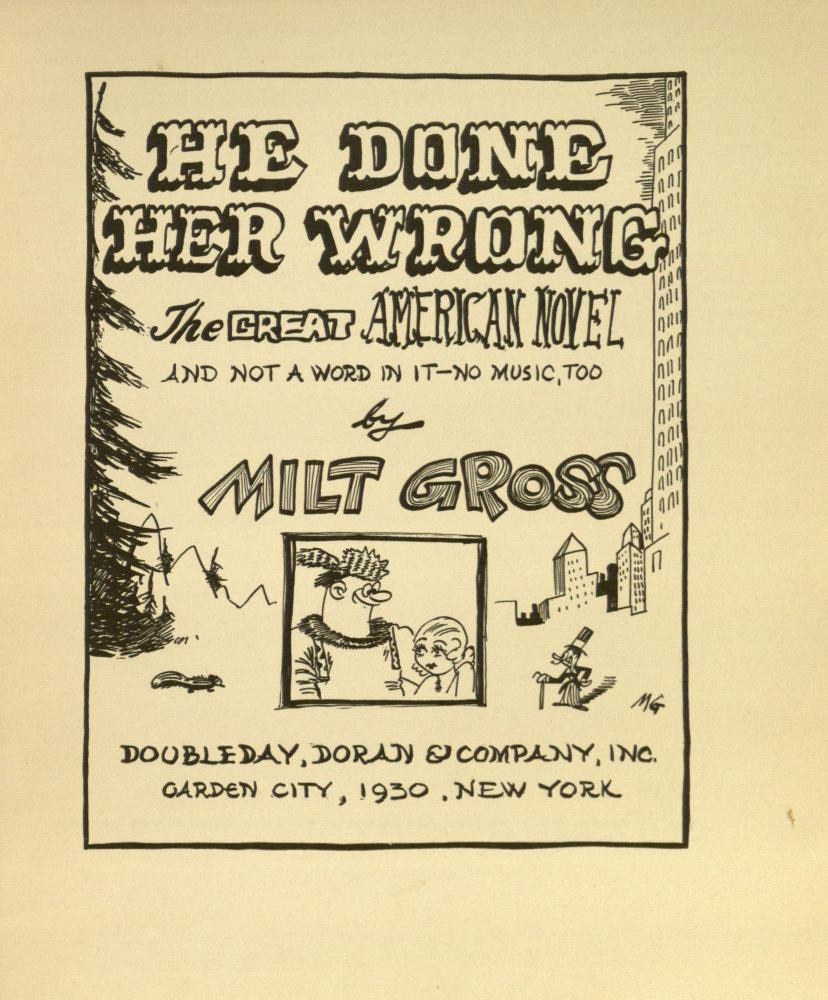
- Title page of He Done Her Wrong
- Creator: Milt Gross
- Date: 1930

He Done Her Wrong is a wordless novel written by American cartoonist Milt Gross and published in 1930. It was not as successful as some of Gross's earlier works, notably his book Nize Baby (1926) based on his newspaper comic strips. He Done Her Wrong has been reprinted in recent years and is now recognized as a comic parody of other similar wordless novels of the early 20th century, as well as an important precursor to the modern graphic novel.

== Plot ==
The narrative of He Done Her Wrong centers on a young country man who falls in love with a barroom singer. A jealous villain tricks the couple and takes the singer to New York. After a chain of humorous occurrences (presented primarily as slapstick comedy) the protagonist is reunited with his love and discovers that he is the son of a rich industrialist. While the protagonist and his love settle down and raise a family, the villain is cornered by the angry fathers of five women with whom he has fathered children, ultimately driven into a life of unhappiness.

== Style ==
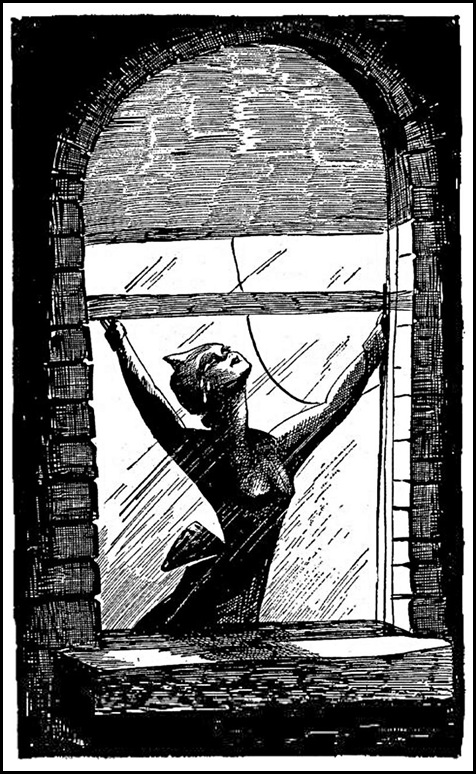
Gross parodies Lynd Ward.

He Done Her Wrong follows Milt Gross's earlier comic strip style illustration. The characters are generally cartoonish, and the male characters in particular often have large protruding noses, emblematic of Gross's comical approach to drawing. Gross's characteristic artwork precedes other similar cartoonish styles, such as that of Harvey Kurtzman of MAD Magazine.

Thematically, He Done Her Wrong is a mixture of different comedic elements, evoking the zany silent film antics of Charlie Chaplin (Gross had previously collaborated with Chaplin on the 1928 film The Circus), the physical comedy of popular slapstick routines, as well as the exaggerated emotionality and melodrama of an adventure film. Despite the implication of the book's lengthy subtitle – "...Not a Word In It – No Music Too" – Gross doesn't refrain from using words entirely, occasionally inserting single words for comedic effect or clarity. The phrase "No Music Too" also calls to mind the silent films of the period (referencing the piano accompaniment typical of these films).

The layout of panels in He Done Her Wrong appears generally standard, but Gross employs several creative framing techniques. Characters occasionally venture beyond the edges of a panel, and some pages feature action sequences in motion within the page, guiding the reader's eye along a determined path. The narrative elements of the book are somewhat unusual as well. Gross often utilizes picture balloons to advance the plot in a more specific fashion than illustrations alone could. He also occasionally makes use of rebus, conveying information without quite relying entirely on either pictures or words.

== Effect ==
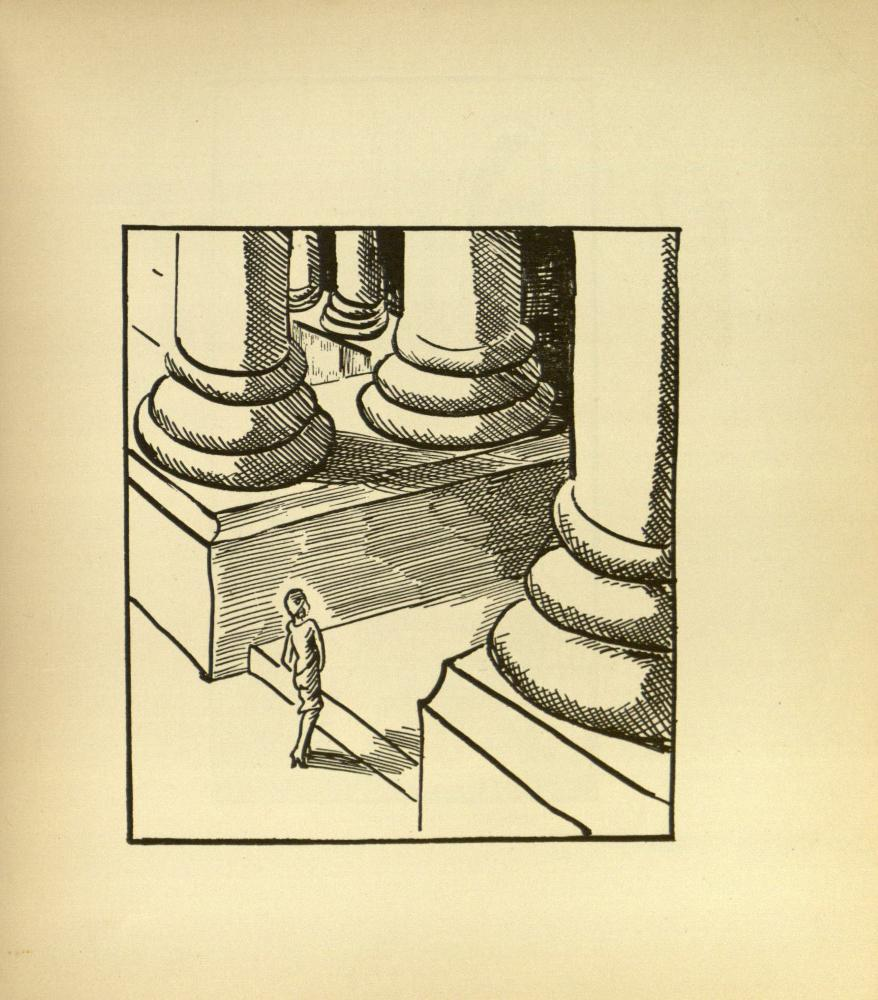
Page from He Done Her Wrong

Though He Done Her Wrong did not become a major hit when it was published, it is now considered a significant early work in long-form comics. Gross wrote it partially as a response to the wordless woodcut novels of the time, (such as those of Lynd Ward or Frans Masereel) lampooning the high-artistic style and intentionally ambiguous messages of these wordless novels and presenting a traditional narrative in a similar format. Despite this, He Done Her Wrong still contains hints of the tense drama present in Ward's novels.

Gross's wordless novel notably influenced later comics works in important ways. His simplistic art style in He Done Her Wrong, while perhaps not as striking as the contemporary woodcut works that influenced it, nonetheless succeeds in producing recognizable characters without identifying them by name. Additionally, despite its length (nearly 300 pages), the action unfolds at a satisfying rate. Later comics works, especially graphic novels, often rely heavily on specific orientation of panels to achieve a desired effect or style of reading, a technique which is visible in the fluid and progressive layout of He Done Her Wrong. Gross also displays an impressive understanding of narrative progress, with each illustration following the last in a concise but comprehensible manner, avoiding long stretches of narrative time between panels, which could risk losing the reader's attention or understanding. Notably, Osamu Tezuka who is considered to be Japan's "God of Comics", was highly influenced by He Done Her Wrong when developing his own cinematic style of comics storytelling, especially in the frequent use of silent panels.

He Done Her Wrong can be viewed along with Gross's other works as a valuable contribution to Jewish popular literature. Though lacking the Yiddish-inflected dialogue that made Gross famous in his comic strips, his self-described "Great American Novel" still draws heavily from Gross's particular brand of comedy, strongly rooted in the Yiddish tradition.
