= Count Screwloose from Tooloose =

1929–1935 American comic strip

Count Screwloose from Tooloose is an American comic strip written and illustrated by Milt Gross, introduced on February 17, 1929. The strips depict the adventures of Count Screwloose, a mentally ill man who frequently leaves Nuttycrest Sanitarium, the insane asylum where he resides, to go out into the rest of the world. There he often meets people who act crazier than he did and thus he always goes back, telling his dog Iggy: "Iggy, keep an eye on me", which became a national catchphrase at the time. The series was discontinued in 1935.

== History ==
In 1937, the comic strip was adapted into a short-lived cartoon series by Metro-Goldwyn-Mayer, with Gross serving as director. Two cartoons were released in 1939 before Gross was fired due to a poor relationship with Fred Quimby.

- Jitterbug Follies
- Wanted: No Master
