= The Captain and the Kids (film series) =

Series of theatrical cartoon short subjects

- Directed by: William Hanna; Robert Allen; Friz Freleng; Burt Gillett
- Starring: Billy Bletcher; Martha Wentworth; Shirley Reed; Jeanne Dunne; Mel Blanc
- Music by: Bert Lewis
- Color process: Black-and-white; Technicolor (The Captain's Christmas and Petunia Natural Park)
- Production company: Metro-Goldwyn-Mayer
- Distributed by: Loew's Inc.
- Release dates: 1938; 1939
- Running time: 7–9 minutes
- Country: United States
- Language: English

In 1938, the comic strip The Captain and the Kids (Rudolph Dirks' parallel version of his own strip The Katzenjammer Kids) was adapted by Metro-Goldwyn-Mayer, becoming the studio's first self-produced series of theatrical animated cartoon, directed by William Hanna, Robert Allen, and Friz Freleng. The short-lived series was unsuccessful, ending after one year and a total of 15 cartoons. Following that cancellation, Freleng returned to Leon Schlesinger Productions, where he had earlier been an animation director. The Captain was voiced by Billy Bletcher, Mama was voiced by Martha Wentworth, the kids were voiced by Shirley Reed and Jeanne Dunne, and John Silver was voiced by Mel Blanc.

== Titles ==
#	Title	Directed by	Release date
1	Blue Monday	William Hanna	February 11, 1938
2	Cleaning House	Robert Allen	February 12, 1938 (Note: Archived from a February 15 article, this is based on the fact that new cartoon shorts would typically premiere in theaters on Saturdays.) (earliest known date)
3	Poultry Pirates	Friz Freleng	April 16, 1938
4	The Captain's Pup	Robert Allen	April 30, 1938
5	A Day at the Beach	Friz Freleng	June 25, 1938
6	What a Lion!	William Hanna	July 16, 1938
7	The Pygmy Hunt	Friz Freleng	August 6, 1938
8	Old Smokey	William Hanna	September 3, 1938
9	Buried Treasure	Robert Allen	September 17, 1938
10	The Winning Ticket	Burt Gillett	October 1, 1938
11	The Honduras Hurricane	Friz Freleng	October 15, 1938
12	Petunia Natural Park (Note: Filmed in Technicolor.)	Friz Freleng	December 8, 1938 (earliest known date)
13	The Captain's Christmas	Friz Freleng	December 10, 1938
14	Seal Skinners	Friz Freleng	January 21, 1939
15	Mama's New Hat	Friz Freleng	February 11, 1939

== See also ==
- Count Screwloose from Tooloose
