= Irven Spence =

American animator (1909–1995)

- Born: Irven LeRoy Spence; April 24, 1909; Lincoln, Nebraska, U.S.
- Died: September 21, 1995 (aged 86); Dallas, Texas, U.S.
- Occupation: Animator
- Employer(s): Winkler Pictures (1930); Animated Pictures (1930-36); Leon Schlesinger Productions (1936-38); Metro-Goldwyn-Mayer (1938-46, 1947-56); John Sutherland Productions (1946-47, 1959); Animation Inc. (1956); Walter Lantz Productions (1956-1959); Grantray-Lawrence Animation (1958); United Productions of America (1959-62, 1970); Hanna-Barbera Productions (1961-90); DePatie-Freleng Enterprises (1969-71); Chuck Jones Enterprises (1970-71, 1973); Bakshi Enterprises (1973-82, 1988, 1992); Richard Williams Productions (1977); Film Roman (1992)
- Spouse: Alice Amelia Hossfield (m. 1931; died 1984)
- Children: Darlene Saurette (1933–1979)
- Parent(s): Charles Harvey Spence; Annie Elizabeth Anderson

Irven LeRoy Spence (April 24, 1909 – September 21, 1995) was an American animator. He was best known for his work on Metro-Goldwyn-Mayer's Tom and Jerry animated shorts. Spence has been credited variously as Irven Spence, Irvin Spence, and Irv Spence.

== Career ==
Spence interest in drawing began in his youth, when he provided cartoons for his high school newspaper (along with classmate William Hanna). Spence's earliest animation work was for Charles Mintz's Winkler Pictures, and then for Ub Iwerks's Animated Picture, where he worked on the "Flip the Frog" series.

After Animated Pictures folded in 1936, Spence worked at Leon Schlesinger Productions as an animator in Tex Avery's animation unit. There, he contributed his rounded, eccentric drawing style to already irreverent animated films such as 1937's Little Red Walking Hood. He later moved to Metro-Goldwyn-Mayer's cartoon department in 1938, starting with The Captain and the Kids cartoons, some of which were directed by fellow Warner alumnus Bill Hanna and Friz Freleng. Spence animated for Milt Gross (on the Count Screwloose cartoons), Hugh Harman, and for the Bill Hanna/Joe Barbera unit. Spence also animated Tex Avery's first four cartoons (Blitz Wolf, The Early Bird Dood It!, Dumb-Hounded and Red Hot Riding Hood) following Avery's arrival at the studio in 1941, before moving over to the Hanna/Barbera unit again. Spence's first credit in a Tom and Jerry short was in The Yankee Doodle Mouse (1943), which received an Academy Award for Best Animated Short; Spence would continue to work on the series, albeit discontinuously, until his final departure from MGM in 1956, with his final credit appearing on 1957's Timid Tabby.

Spence, during his time at MGM, would also directed two live-action spoof films, Rats in Spats in 1941, and Rugged Rangers in 1942. Both films star various staff members who worked in the studio at the time, such as Bill Littlejohn, Pete Burness, Michael Lah, Ray Patterson, Jack Zander, and Ed Barge among others.

Spence would briefly provide character designs for Avery before he left the studio in the mid-40's to work for John Sutherland Productions, but later returned in '47. He left MGM again in August 1956 for Animation, Inc., a commercial production studio, before joining his former bosses at Hanna-Barbera Productions seven years later. He provided animation for many animated television series, including Jonny Quest (1964), Frankenstein Jr. and The Impossibles (1966), and The Pebbles and Bamm-Bamm Show (1971).

In addition to his work for Hanna-Barbera, Spence also worked for Chuck Jones (the 1970 television adaptation of Horton Hears a Who!), DePatie-Freleng Enterprises (Roland and Ratfink, The Ant and the Aardvark), and Ralph Bakshi (Heavy Traffic, Coonskin, Wizards, and the 1978 animated version of The Lord of the Rings). Spence's last animation credit was on Tom and Jerry: The Movie (1992). Spence also conducted a workshop for animators under the auspices of the Motion Picture Screen Cartoonists Local 839. He received the 1986 Winsor McCay Award from the International Animated Film Society, ASIFA-Hollywood, for his lifetime contributions to the field of animation.

== Personal life and death ==
Spence married Alice Amelia Hossfeld in a Latter Day Saints ceremony on January 15, 1931. He was managing a Standard Oil station in Compton, California at the time. They had one daughter. Alice died in 1984 and Spence remarried. Spence in his later years would be diagnosed with Alzheimer's and would die of a heart attack on September 21, 1995, in Dallas, Texas.
