= Metro-Goldwyn-Mayer cartoon department =

Animation division of Metro-Goldwyn-Mayer

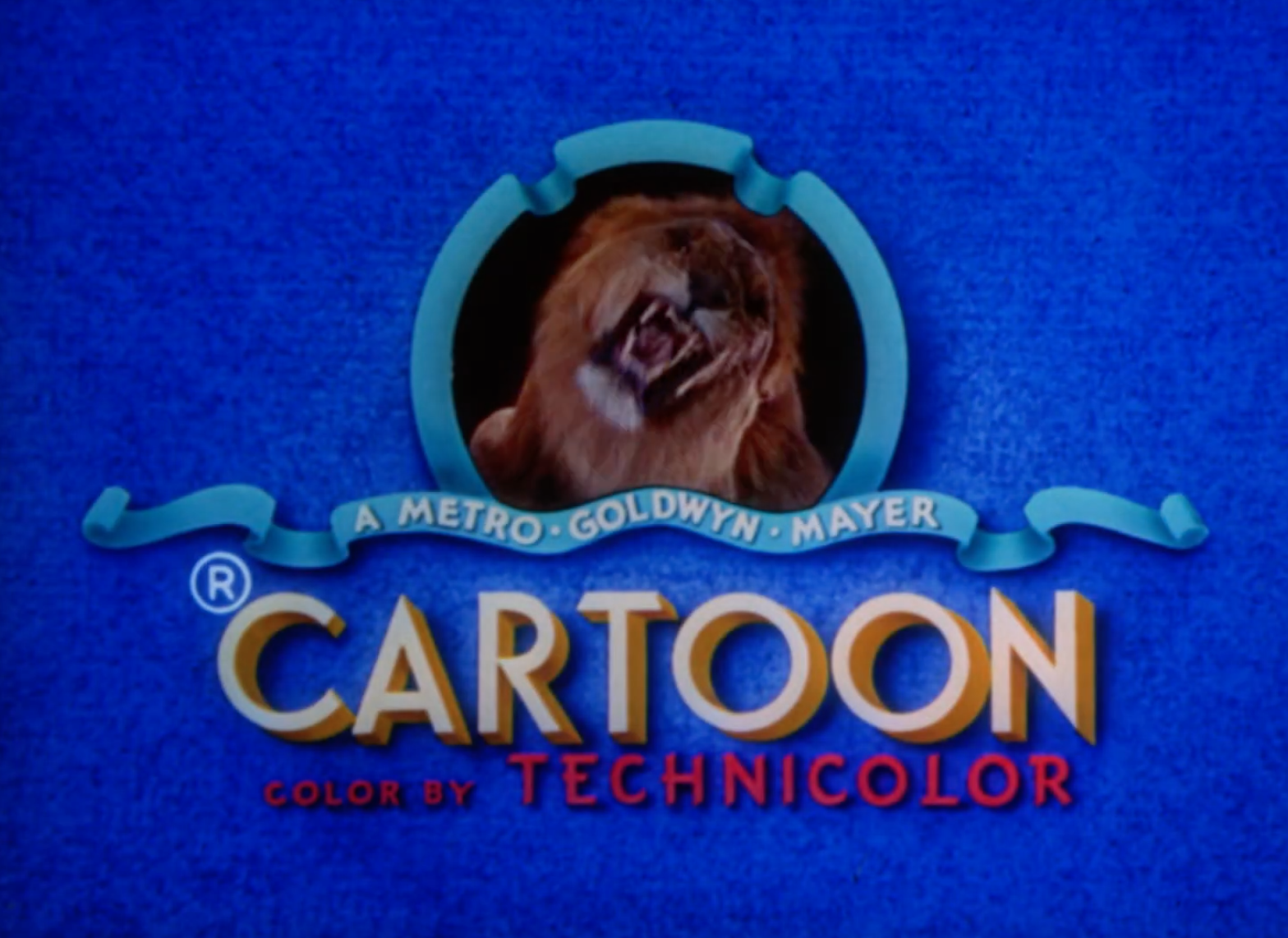
- Studio's opening title card, 1953–1958
- Type: Division
- Industry: Animation; Motion pictures
- Predecessor: Harman-Ising Productions (inherited staff in 1938 after the studio closed)
- Founded: March 1937; 89 years ago
- Founder: Fred Quimby
- Defunct: May 15, 1957; 69 years ago
- Fate: Closed
- Successors: In-house studio: MGM Animation/Visual Arts; Metro-Goldwyn-Mayer Animation; Staff: Hanna-Barbera; Library: Warner Bros. (through Turner Entertainment Co.)
- Headquarters: Overland and Montana Avenue, Culver City, California, United States
- Key people: William Hanna; Joseph Barbera; Hugh Harman; Rudolf Ising; Tex Avery; Fred Quimby; Preston Blair; Michael Lah
- Products: Animated theatrical short films
- Parent: Metro-Goldwyn-Mayer

Metro-Goldwyn-Mayer operated an in-house animation studio, simply named its cartoon department, during the Golden Age of American animation. Active from 1937 until 1957, the cartoon department was responsible for producing animated shorts to accompany MGM's feature films in Loew's Theaters, which included popular cartoon characters and series such as Tex Avery's various cartoon characters and William Hanna and Joseph Barbera's Tom and Jerry series.

Prior to forming its own cartoon studio, MGM released the work of independent animation producer Ub Iwerks, and later the Happy Harmonies series from Hugh Harman and Rudolf Ising. The MGM cartoon studio was founded to replace Harman and Ising, although both men eventually became employees of the studio. After a slow start, the studio began to take off in 1940 after its short The Milky Way became the first non-Disney cartoon to win the Academy Award for Best Short Subjects: Cartoons. The studio's roster of talent benefited from an exodus of animators from the Warner Bros. and Disney studios, who were facing issues with union workers. Originally established and run by executive Fred Quimby, Hanna and Barbera became the heads of the studio in 1955 following Quimby's retirement. The cartoon studio was closed on May 15, 1957, at which time Hanna and Barbera took much of the staff to form their own company, Hanna-Barbera Productions, then named H-B Enterprises.

Turner Broadcasting System (via Turner Entertainment Co.) took over the library in 1986 after Ted Turner's short-lived ownership of MGM/UA. When Turner sold back the MGM/UA production unit, he kept the pre-May 1986 MGM library, including the MGM cartoons, for his own company. In 1996, Turner Broadcasting System merged with Time Warner, the parent company of Warner Bros., which currently owns the rights to the pre-May 1986 MGM library via Turner Entertainment Co. and also owns the rights to much of Hanna-Barbera's library after Hanna-Barbera was absorbed into Warner Bros. Animation and replaced by Cartoon Network Studios in 2001 following the death of William Hanna. As of 2026, Skydance owns the pre-1986 Metro-Goldwyn-Mayer cartoons as part of Warner Bros. Entertainment.

== Background ==
In the 1930s, to promote their films and attract larger theater audiences, the studios produced many short subjects to supplement the main feature, including travelogues, serials, comedies, newsreels, and cartoons. During the late 1920s, Walt Disney Productions had achieved enormous popular and critical success with its Mickey Mouse and Silly Symphony cartoons. Several other studios, Metro-Goldwyn-Mayer among them, noted Disney's success and began looking for ways to equal or surpass Disney. MGM had tried but failed to acquire distribution rights to Mickey Mouse and Silly Symphonies shorts from then-distributors Columbia Pictures and United Artists. However, they succeeded in contracting Disney to work on their 1934 musical comedy Hollywood Party; a segment in Technicolor called The Hot Choc-late Soldiers, and a sequence with Jimmy Durante interacting with an animated Mickey Mouse were produced. Future attempts in collaborations with Disney, including Anchors Aweigh, did not materialize.

MGM's first foray into animation was the Flip the Frog cartoon series, produced independently for Celebrity Pictures by Ub Iwerks, formerly the head animator at the Disney studio. Celebrity Pictures' Pat Powers had hired Iwerks away from Disney with the promise of giving Iwerks his own studio, and was able to secure a distribution deal with MGM for the Flip the Frog cartoons. The first Flip the Frog cartoon, Fiddlesticks, was released in January 1931, and over two-dozen other Flip cartoons followed during the next three years. In 1934, the Flip character was dropped in favor of Willie Whopper. Willie Whopper failed to catch on, and MGM terminated its distribution deal with Iwerks and Powers, who had already begun independently distributing the Iwerks ComiColor cartoons.

In August 1934, MGM signed a new deal with Disney alumni Hugh Harman and Rudolf Ising, which had just broken ties with producer Leon Schlesinger and Warner Bros. Pictures over budget concerns, to work on a new series of high-budget color cartoons. The director team brought with them much of their staff from their time with Schlesinger, including animators and storymen such as C. G. Maxwell, William Hanna, and brothers Robert and Thomas McKimson. Also following Harman and Ising from Schlesinger was Bosko, a successful character the duo had created for the Looney Tunes series. After learning from Disney's experiences with Oswald the Lucky Rabbit, whose ownership by Universal Pictures led to Winkler Pictures' collapse after Disney's departure, Harman and Ising retained the rights to Bosko alongside their other characters; only Bosko was used in a significant capacity.

The first entry in MGM's new Happy Harmonies series, The Discontented Canary, was completed in September 1934 and released in October. The series continued for three years, moving from two-strip to three-strip Technicolor in 1935. The Happy Harmonies canon included a handful of entries starring Bosko, who, by 1936, was redesigned from an ambiguous "inkblot" character to a discernible little African-American boy. The directors worked separately on their own films, although both strived to create elaborate films that would compete with Disney's award-winning Silly Symphonies.

However, budget problems threatened to plague Harman and Ising a second time: Happy Harmonies cartoons regularly ran over budget, and Harman paid no heed to MGM's demands that he reduce the costs of the shorts. MGM retaliated in February 1937 by deciding to open its own cartoon studio and hired away most of the Harman-Ising staff to do so. The final Happy Harmonies short, The Little Bantamweight, was released in March 1938, and Harman and Ising went on to do freelance animation work for Walt Disney before their studio closed down for bankruptcy.

While MGM was still under contract of Harman-Ising, the studio commissioned Oskar Fischinger to do a cartoon titled An Optical Poem. While Fischinger had the option from MGM to continue doing more films from them in his contract, the film did not earn a profit at the box-office, citing overhead costs, ending MGM's relationship with Fischinger.

== History ==
=== Early years (1937–1939) ===
In March 1937, MGM hired film sales executive Fred Quimby, who had no experience in the animation industry, to set up and run the new MGM cartoon department. Among the holdovers from the Harman-Ising regime, William Hanna and Robert Allen were appointed directors, and C. G. Maxwell became production manager. Quimby raided every major American animation studio for talent, extracting artists, directors, and writers such as Leon Schlesinger Productions, Screen Gems and much of the top staff at Terrytoons. After spending some time headquartered in a nearby house, the new MGM cartoon studio at Overland Ave. and Montana Ave. opened its doors on August 23, 1937. Harman-Ising alumni Friz Freleng, Robert Allen and William Hanna were assigned as the studio's first directors.

Although it boasted a brand-new facility and good directors, the MGM cartoon studio's first series failed. The Captain and The Kids, adapted from Rudolph Dirks' The Captain and the Kids comic strip, was licensed by MGM without consulting its then-forming creative staff, in an attempt to replicate the success of Fleischer Studios' Popeye the Sailor shorts. Freleng, Hanna, and Allen struggled to translate the Katzenjammer humor into animation, and the series folded after fifteen shorts. Only two of the Captain and the Kids shorts were produced in Technicolor; the other thirteen were produced in black-and-white and released in sepia-toned prints.

MGM brought in established newspaper cartoonists such as Milt Gross and Harry Hershfield in an attempt to both bolster the Captain and the Kids product and create original properties for MGM, but both cartoonists' tenures at the studio were short-lived. Gross managed to complete two cartoons, Jitterbug Follies and Wanted: No Master, with his characters Count Screwloose of Tooloose and J.R. the Wonder Dog, but left due to his poor relationship with Quimby. Hershfield completed no cartoons.

=== Harman and Ising return (1938–1943) ===
Studio's opening title card, 1939–1942

In January 1939, Quimby, coming full-circle, hired Hugh Harman and Rudolf Ising as the new creative heads of the studio after their previous studio closed down, acting as both directors and producers, and in charge of many of the employees who had defected from that studio a year before. Harman and Ising agreed to join under the condition Scott Bradley follow them to the studio.

Among Ising's first new cartoons for MGM was 1939's The Bear That Couldn't Sleep, the debut appearance of Barney Bear, a lumbering anthropomorphic bear based upon both Wallace Beery and Ising himself. Barney Bear would become MGM's first original cartoon star, popular enough to be regularly featured in cartoons until 1954. Ising focused on the Barney Bear cartoons, while Harman focused on making elaborate one-shot cartoons, although Harman was able to establish a short-lived series of Bear Family cartoons.

At this time, Harman created his masterpiece, Peace on Earth. Released during the holiday season of 1939 (immediately after the outbreak of World War II in Europe), Peace on Earth was a dramatic cartoon that dealt with the idea of what a post-apocalyptic world would be like. Peace on Earth was nominated for the 1939 Academy Award for Short Subjects (Cartoons).

=== Tom and Jerry (1940–1958) ===
Friz Freleng, briefly assigned to work under Harman, returned to Schlesinger after his MGM contract expired in April 1939. Ising-unit storymen Joseph Barbera and William Hanna directed 1940's Puss Gets the Boot, featuring a mouse's attempts to outwit a house cat named Jasper. Though released without fanfare, the short was financially and critically successful, earning an Academy Award nomination for Best Short Subject (Cartoons) in 1940. On the strength of the Oscar nomination and public demand, Hanna and Barbera were given their own unit and assigned to direct more cat-and-mouse cartoons, soon christening the characters Tom and Jerry. Puss Gets the Boot did not win the 1940 Academy Award for Best Cartoon, but another MGM cartoon, Rudolf Ising's The Milky Way did, making MGM the first studio to wrest the Cartoon Academy Award away from Walt Disney Productions. Tom and Jerry quickly became MGM's most valuable animated property. The shorts were successful at the box office, many licensed products (comic books, toys, etc.) were released to the market, and the series would earn twelve more Academy Award for Short Subjects (Cartoons) nominations, with seven of the Tom & Jerry shorts going on to win the Academy Award: The Yankee Doodle Mouse (1943), Mouse Trouble (1944), Quiet Please! (1945), The Cat Concerto (1947), The Little Orphan (1949), The Two Mouseketeers (1952) and Johann Mouse (1953). Tom and Jerry was eventually tied with Disney's Silly Symphonies as the most-awarded theatrical cartoon series. Originally barred by Quimby from making a second cat-and-mouse short until the overwhelming success of Puss Gets the Boot demanded it, Hanna and Barbera and their team of animators, who included George Gordon, Jack Zander, Kenneth Muse, Irven Spence, Ed Barge, Ray Patterson, and Pete Burness, worked on Tom and Jerry cartoons almost exclusively from 1941 until 1955. Exceptions were half a dozen one-shot theatrical shorts, including Gallopin' Gals (1940), Officer Pooch (1941), War Dogs (1943), Good Will to Men (1955), and the last seven films in the Droopy series.

Key to the successes of Tom and Jerry and other MGM cartoons was the work of Scott Bradley, who scored virtually all of the cartoons for the studio throughout its existence. Bradley's scores made use of both classical and jazz sensibilities. In addition, he often used songs from the scores of MGM's feature films, the most frequent of them being "The Trolley Song" from Meet Me in St. Louis and "Sing Before Breakfast" from Broadway Melody of 1936.

=== Tex Avery (1942–1953) ===
Jerky Turkey by Tex Avery

Hugh Harman left MGM in April 1941, and Rudolf Ising departed two years later. George Gordon took over Ising's department, continuing work on the Barney Bear cartoons. He completed three Barney Bear cartoons as well as a few other such as The Stork's Holiday and the short lived Ol' Doc Donkey series before he left the studio in 1943. In Harman's place, Quimby hired Tex Avery, an animation director known for his wild comedic style at the Schlesinger studio, who had recently left Paramount Pictures after creating the Speaking of Animals series. Avery's first short for MGM was the World War II parody Blitz Wolf, which was nominated for the 1942 Academy Award for Short Subjects (Cartoons). While Avery had revolutionized cartoon humor at Schlesinger's, he went several steps further in his MGM works. Avery exaggerated his characters and situations wildly, and was noted for the precise and hard-edged timing of his gags. Among Avery's most noted cartoons for MGM were slapstick comedies such as Red Hot Riding Hood (1943), Jerky Turkey (1945), Northwest Hounded Police (1946), King-Size Canary (1947), Little Rural Riding Hood (1949), and Bad Luck Blackie (1949). While Avery preferred to focus on gags instead of characterization, he established several popular MGM cartoon characters, including Screwball "Screwy" Squirrel, the Of Mice and Men derived pair of George and Junior, and his best-known character, Droopy. Droopy, voiced by Bill Thompson (a.k.a. "Wallace Wimple" on NBC Radio's Fibber McGee and Molly show) debuted in 1943 with Dumb-Hounded. He appeared in several more Avery cartoons (including Northwest Hounded Police) before being officially given his own series in 1949 with Señor Droopy. Also in 1949, Avery would debut Butch (formerly named Spike) who would be a recurring antagonist in the Droopy films but also as a star in his own films such as Magical Maestro (1952), Rock-a-Bye-Bear (1952) and Cellbound (1955) which was Avery's final cartoon for MGM.

The influence of Avery's cartoons was felt across the animation industry; even Hanna and Barbera adapted their Tom and Jerry shorts to match the levels of madcap humor and violence in Avery's films. Avery's team included storymen Rich Hogan and Heck Allen, and animators such as Michael Lah, Ed Love, and Preston Blair, an ex-Disney animator most famous for animating Red in Red Hot Riding Hood and its follow-ups. In 1946, Quimby assigned Blair and Lah to direct a new series of Barney Bear cartoons after George Gordon left for John Sutherland Productions. The unit was disbanded after three cartoons, with Blair also leaving for Sutherland.

=== CinemaScope (1953–1957) ===
Tex Avery was a perfectionist: he worked extensively on his films' stories and gags, revised his animators' drawings, and was even known to cut frames out of the final Technicolor answer print to sharpen the comedy timing. The strain of overwork caused Avery to quit MGM in May 1950, after completing Rock-a-Bye Bear (not released until 1952 because of MGM's cartoon backlog). Former Walter Lantz Productions and Disney director Dick Lundy were brought in to head Avery's unit. Lundy completed one Droopy and ten Barney Bear cartoons, refining the latter series' uneven comedic pacing. Avery returned in October 1951 and reassumed his role as director from Lundy, starting with Little Johnny Jet (released in 1953).

Avery directed eleven more cartoons for MGM, many of them showing the heavy influence of the newly popular UPA studio and its simplified designs. In March 1953, MGM temporarily closed down the cartoon unit, thinking that the growing trend for 3D films would bring an end to the animated cartoon. Avery himself did not leave the studio until June, working with co-director Michael Lah on two more cartoons, Deputy Droopy and Cellbound, which Lah completed with the Hanna and Barbera staff (working during the most part of 1953 for commercials, as a predecessor of H-B Enterprises) during the closure. Avery returned to Walter Lantz Productions the following February, while Lah went on to do commercial animation work. Because of a large backlog of completed MGM cartoons, the cartoons Avery completed during his second tenure at the studio were not released until after he left again; Cellbound was not released until 1955.

Meanwhile, after the studio reopened in 1954, budget cuts required Hanna and Barbera to reduce the level of detail in their Tom and Jerry shorts (a precursor of what was to come), and to also begin doing one "cheater" short per year composed mostly of reused footage from previously released cartoons. That year, Hanna and Barbera directed Pet Peeve, the first MGM cartoon in the new widescreen CinemaScope process, which had been was devised as a means to keep audiences attending movie theatres in the wake of the popularity of television. Pet Peeve, released in late 1954, was followed by a sporadic number of CinemaScope Tom and Jerry shorts, with several other Tom and Jerry shorts being dual-released in standard format and in CinemaScope. After Pecos Pest (released in 1955), all MGM cartoons were released in CinemaScope. Six previous MGM cartoons, among them Hugh Harman's Peace on Earth, were remade in CinemaScope. Like the original Peace on Earth in 1939, its 1955 remake, Good Will to Men, was nominated for the Academy Award for Best Short Subject (Cartoons).

=== Later years (1955–1957) ===
Quimby retired in 1955, and Hanna and Barbera became the new heads of the studio. Michael Lah returned to the studio in 1955 to direct an animated sequence for the MGM feature Invitation to the Dance, and stayed on to supervise a new series of CinemaScope Droopy cartoons to accompany the new CinemaScope Tom and Jerry cartoons.

Lah's One Droopy Knight was nominated for the 1957 Academy Award for Best Short Subject (Cartoons). However, for the most part, both the 1955–1957 CinemaScope Droopy and Tom and Jerry cartoons had lost their appeal in the eyes of critics due to weaker stories and simplistic animation, which were the result of the budget cuts. MGM had begun reissuing previously released cartoons since the 1940s, but decided in late 1956 that, due to the reissued shorts bringing in as much revenue as the new shorts, it could save $600,000 a year by shutting down production on new shorts. Virtually all films produced by the studio, with the exception of the Screwy Squirrel, George and Junior series and one-shot films, were reissued under the Gold Medal series.

The MGM cartoon studio was closed on May 15, 1957; the last cartoon made by the studio was released in 1958. Hanna and Barbera took most of their unit and began producing television cartoons with their company Hanna-Barbera Productions. Hanna-Barbera first approached MGM to distribute their cartoons for television but was turned down. Columbia Pictures' Screen Gems picked up Hanna-Barbera's series, and the studio soon became the most successful producers of television animation in the world. MGM would later outsource the production of Tom and Jerry cartoons to Rembrandt Films, solely due to Gene Deitch's cartoons winning awards, only for the new series to be lambasted by critics and audiences. MGM later contracted Chuck Jones and Les Goldman's Sib Tower 12 studio to create more Tom and Jerry shorts. Sib Tower 12 was absorbed by MGM in 1964 and was renamed MGM Animation/Visual Arts.

== Legacy ==
Many MGM cartoons have received critical acclaim throughout the years due to their extremely high-quality animation, especially the Tom and Jerry shorts, or in the case of Tex Avery's work, their raunchy nature and fast pacing. Individual shorts such as To Spring (1936) and The Dot and the Line (1965) have been acclaimed for their artistic designs while others such as Screwball Squirrel (1944) and King-Size Canary (1947) are celebrated for their sheer lunacy.

On May 30, 1978, a two-alarm fire affecting four buildings at the George Eastman Museum resulted in the loss of some rare movie films and still photographs in the collection, including the original negatives to pre-1951 films produced by the studio, much of which only survived by way of Gold Medal Reprints, reissued versions with master positives stored by MGM and later Turner Entertainment Co., who owns all MGM cartoons through their acquisition of MGM's pre-1986 library. Original prints of the reissued cartoons, including censored cartoons such as The Yankee Doodle Mouse and Red Hot Riding Hood, remained lost to this day.

As of 2009, nearly all of the Hanna and Barbera-produced Tom and Jerry shorts are available on DVD under the Tom and Jerry Spotlight Collection, a series of three DVD box sets that were released from October 2004 to September 2007 (however, two cartoons are missing due to politically incorrect scenes, and several of the released ones are edited). Warner Home Video would later release the Tom and Jerry shorts as part of the Tom and Jerry Golden Collection series of DVD and Blu-ray box sets, which started with the first volume being released October 25, 2011, with the shorts being presented uncut, restored, remastered, in chronological order, and for the Blu-ray version, in 1080p high definition. A second volume was also announced, but was ultimately scrapped as Warner Home Video still had reservations about two politically incorrect shorts (the Volume 2 restorations were released internationally for digital releases and TV airings). Moreover, a two-disc collection of all of Droopy's cartoons was released in May 2007. In February 2020, the Warner Archive Collection started releasing Tex Avery Screwball Classics Blu-rays and DVDs with 19 of Tex Avery's MGM cartoons. A second volume was announced in March and was released on December 15, 2020, followed by a third one that was released on October 5, 2021 and a fourth one on December 1, 2026. On February 11, 2025, the Warner Archive Collection released "Tom and Jerry: The Complete CinemaScope Collection", which collects the 23 Tom and Jerry cartoons released in CinemaScope, alongside the 2 Spike and Tyke CinemaScope cartoons, and Good Will to Men. On December 2, 2025, the Warner Archive Collection released Tom and Jerry: The Golden Era Anthology, which collects all of the Hanna and Barbera-produced Tom and Jerry cartoons. A four-disc set, Tex Avery: The Definitive Screwball Classics Collection, a complete box set containing the entire Avery library, the original release prints of The Shooting of Dan McGoo (1945), Wild and Woolfy (1945), and Lucky Ducky (1948), in addition to the Michael Lah Droopy cartoons, is in development and will release on December 1, 2026.

== Filmography ==
Series

- The Captain and the Kids (1938–1939; directed by William Hanna, Robert Allen and Friz Freleng)
- Count Screwloose and J.R. the Wonder Dog (1939; directed by Milt Gross)
- Barney Bear (1939–1954; directed by Rudolf Ising, Robert Allen, George Gordon, Preston Blair, Michael Lah and Dick Lundy)
- Tom and Jerry (1940–1958; directed by William Hanna and Joseph Barbera, 1961–1962; directed by Gene Deitch, 1963–1967; directed by Chuck Jones)
- Droopy (1943–1958; directed by Tex Avery, Dick Lundy and Michael Lah)
- Screwy Squirrel (1944–1946; directed by Tex Avery)
- George and Junior (1946–1948; directed by Tex Avery)
- Butch (1949-1957; directed by Tex Avery and Michael Lah)
- Spike and Tyke (1957; directed by William Hanna and Joseph Barbera)

Live-action films with animated sequences

- Anchors Aweigh (1945; "The Worry Song" sequence with Gene Kelly and Jerry Mouse with a cameo by Tom Cat; directed by William Hanna and Joseph Barbera and animated by Kenneth Muse, Ray Patterson and Ed Barge)
- Holiday in Mexico (1946; Animated title sequence)
- Dangerous When Wet (1953; Animated swimming sequence with Esther Williams and Tom and Jerry)
- Invitation to the Dance (1956; "Sinbad the Sailor" sequence)

Other productions/works

- Chiquita Banana animated theatrical commercials (1947–1949; for John Sutherland Productions)
- Fun And Facts About America (1948–1952; industrial cartoon film series with animation provided for John Sutherland Productions)

== MGM cartoon department staff: (1937-1957) ==
=== Producers ===
- Hugh Harman (1938–1942)
- Rudolf Ising (1938–1943)
- Fred Quimby (1937–1955)
- William Hanna (1955–1957)
- Joseph Barbera (1955–1957)

=== Directors ===
- Robert Allen (1937, 1941–1942)
- Tex Avery (1942–1955)
- Joseph Barbera (1940–1957)
- Preston Blair (1948–1949)
- Jerry Brewer (1942)
- Friz Freleng (1938–1939)
- Burt Gillett (1938)
- George Gordon (1943–1945)
- Milt Gross (1939)
- William Hanna (1937–1957)
- Hugh Harman (1939–1942)
- Rudolf Ising (1939–1943)
- Michael Lah (1945, 1948-1949, 1955–1957)
- Dick Lundy (1952–1954)

=== Script writers ===
- Heck Allen
- Joseph Barbera
- Homer Brightman
- Pinto Colvig
- Jack Cosgriff
- Otto Englander
- Rich Hogan
- Cal Howard
- William Hanna
- Jerry Mann
- Webb Smith
- Roy Williams

=== Animators ===
- Ray Abrams
- Robert Allen
- Ed Barge
- Robert Bentley
- Richard Bickenbach
- Preston Blair
- Pete Burness
- Robert Cannon
- Jack Carr
- Walter Clinton
- Ben Clopton
- Herman Cohen
- James Escalante
- Arnold Gillespie
- George Gordon
- Al Grandmain
- Emery Hawkins
- Michael Lah
- Irving Levine
- Bill Littlejohn
- Ed Love
- Lewis Marshall
- Manuel Moreno
- Kenneth Muse
- Bill Nolan
- Jim Pabian
- Tony Pabian
- Don Patterson
- Ray Patterson
- Bill Schipek
- Louie Schmitt
- Leonard Sebring
- William Shull
- Grant Simmons
- Paul Sommer
- Ken Southworth
- Irven Spence
- Cecil Surry
- David Treffman
- Gil Turner
- Bill Tytla
- Carl Urbano
- Carlo Vinci
- Don Williams
- Rudy Zamora
- Jack Zander

=== Layout and background artists ===
- Ed Benedict
- Richard Bickenbach
- Walter Clinton
- Harvey Eisenberg
- Robert Gentle
- Gene Hazelton
- John Didrik Johnsen
- Irving Levine
- Louie Schmitt
- Claude Smith
- Joseph Smith
- Irven Spence
- Bernard Wolf

=== Voice actors ===
- Tex Avery
- Joseph Barbera
- Sara Berner
- Mel Blanc
- Billy Bletcher
- Lucille Bliss
- Daws Butler
- Red Coffey
- Pinto Colvig
- Hans Conried
- June Foray
- Paul Frees
- Frank Graham
- William Hanna
- Cal Howard
- Rudolf Ising
- Harry E. Lang
- Patrick McGeehan
- Lillian Randolph
- Kent Rogers
- Bill Thompson
- Thea Vidale
- Martha Wentworth
- Gayne Whitman

=== Musical directors ===
- Scott Bradley (1939–1957)
- Bert Lewis (1937–1939)
- Edward Plumb (1953)

=== Sound design department ===
- Fred McAlpin (1937–1948)
- Jim Faris (1948–1952)
- Lovell Norman (1952–1957)

== See also ==
- The Golden Age of American animation
- Turner Entertainment Co.
- Warner Bros. Animation
- Hanna-Barbera
- MGM Animation/Visual Arts
- Metro-Goldwyn-Mayer Animation

== Bibliography ==
- Barrier, Michael (1999). Hollywood Cartoons: American Animation in Its Golden Age. Oxford: Oxford University Press. ISBN 0-19-516729-5.
- Maltin, Leonard (1980, rev. 1987) Of Mice and Magic: A History of American Animated Cartoons, New York: Plume Books. ISBN 0-452-25993-2
- Adams, T.R. (1991), Tom and Jerry: Fifty Years of Cat and Mouse, ISBN 0-517-05688-7
