= William Hanna =

American animator and voice actor (1910–2001)

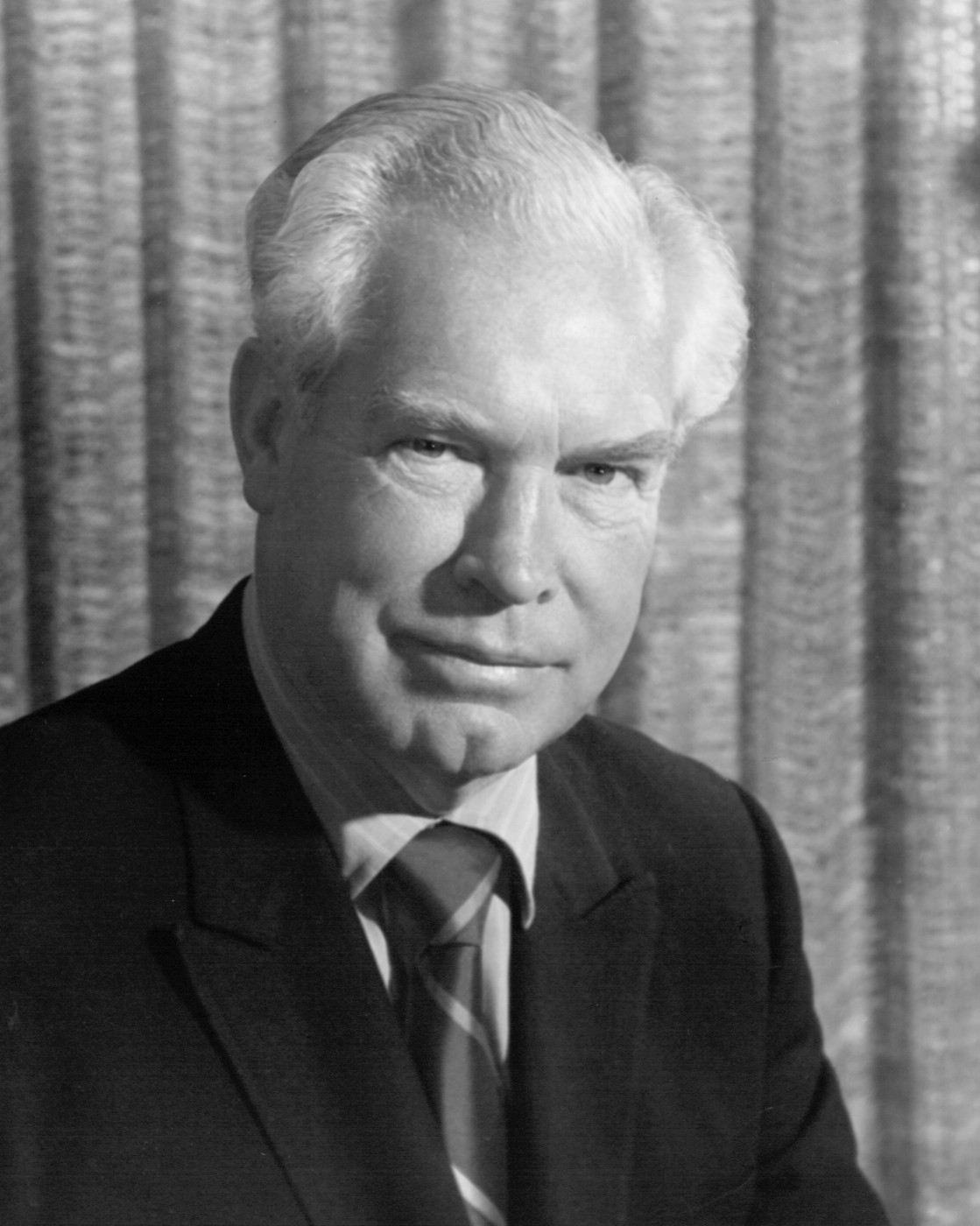
- Hanna in 1977
- Born: July 14, 1910; Melrose, New Mexico Territory, U.S.
- Died: March 22, 2001 (aged 90); Los Angeles, California, U.S.
- Burial place: Ascension Cemetery, Lake Forest, California, U.S.
- Occupations: Animator; musician; voice actor
- Years active: 1930–2001
- Employer(s): Harman-Ising Productions (1930–1937); MGM Cartoons (1937–1957); Hanna-Barbera (1957–2001)
- Spouse: Violet Wogatzke (m. 1936)
- Children: 2

William Denby Hanna (July 14, 1910 – March 22, 2001) was an American animator, musician, and voice actor. Hanna and Joseph Barbera co-created Tom and Jerry and founded the animation studio and production company Hanna-Barbera, with Hanna providing the vocal effects for Tom and Jerry's title characters.

Hanna joined the Harman and Ising animation studio in 1930 and steadily gained skill and prominence while working on cartoons such as Captain and the Kids. In 1937, while working at Metro-Goldwyn-Mayer (MGM), Hanna met Barbera and formed a working relationship. In 1957, they co-founded Hanna-Barbera, which became the most successful television animation studio in the business, creating or producing programs such as The Flintstones, The Huckleberry Hound Show, The Jetsons, Scooby-Doo, The Smurfs, and Yogi Bear. In 1967, Hanna-Barbera was sold to Taft Broadcasting for $12 million (equivalent to about $116 million today) but Hanna and Barbera remained heads of the company until 1991. At that time, the studio was sold to Turner Broadcasting System, which in turn was merged with Time Warner in 1996; Hanna and Barbera stayed on as advisors.

Tom and Jerry won seven Academy Awards, while Hanna and Barbera were nominated for two others and won eight Emmy Awards. Their cartoons have become cultural icons, and their cartoon characters have appeared in other media such as films, books, and toys. Hanna-Barbera's shows had a worldwide audience of over 300 million people in their 1960s heyday and have been translated into more than 28 languages.

== Early and personal life ==
Hanna was born to William John and Avice Joyce (née Denby) Hanna on July 14, 1910, in Melrose, New Mexico Territory. He was the third of seven children. Hanna described his family as "a red-blooded, Irish-American family". His father was a construction superintendent for railroads as well as water and sewer systems throughout the Western United States, requiring the family to move frequently.

When Hanna was three years old, the family moved to Baker City, Oregon, where his father worked on the Balm Creek Dam. It was there that Hanna would develop his love of the outdoors. The family moved to Logan, Utah, before moving to San Pedro, California, in 1917. During the next two years they moved several times before eventually settling in Watts, California, in 1919.

In 1922, while living in Watts, he joined the Boy Scouts. He attended Compton High School from 1925 through 1928, where he played the saxophone in a dance band. His passion for music carried over into his career; he helped write songs for his cartoons, including the theme for The Flintstones. Hanna became an Eagle Scout as a youth and remained active in Scouting throughout his life. As an adult, he served as a Scoutmaster and was recognized by the Boy Scouts of America with their Distinguished Eagle Scout Award in 1985. Despite his numerous career-related awards, Hanna was most proud of this Distinguished Eagle Scout Award. His interests also included sailing and singing in a barbershop quartet. Hanna studied both journalism and structural engineering at Compton City College, but had to drop out of college with the onset of the Great Depression.

On August 7, 1936, Hanna married Violet Blanch Wogatzke, and they had a marriage lasting over 64 years, until his death. The marriage produced two children, David William and Bonnie Jean. In 1996, Hanna, with assistance from Los Angeles writer Tom Ito, published his autobiography.

== Early career ==
After dropping out of college, Hanna worked briefly as a construction engineer and helped build the Pantages Theatre in Hollywood. He lost that job during the Great Depression and found another at a car wash. His sister's boyfriend encouraged him to apply for a job at Leon Schlesinger's Pacific Title & Art Studio, which produced title cards for motion pictures. While working there, Hanna's talent for drawing became evident, so Schlesinger referred him to Harman-Ising Productions, an animation studio which partnered with Schlesinger to produce the Looney Tunes and Merrie Melodies series.

Despite a lack of formal training, Hanna soon became head of their ink and paint department. Besides inking and painting, Hanna also wrote songs and lyrics. When Hugh Harman and Rudolf Ising chose to break with Schlesinger and begin producing cartoons independently for Metro-Goldwyn-Mayer (MGM) in 1933, Hanna was one of the employees who followed them.

Hanna was given the opportunity to direct his first cartoon in 1936; the result was To Spring, part of the Harman-Ising Happy Harmonies series. The following year, MGM decided to terminate their partnership with Harman-Ising and bring production in-house. Hanna was among the first people MGM hired away from Harman-Ising to their new cartoon department. During 1938–1939, he served as a senior director on MGM's The Captain and the Kids series, based upon the comic strip of the same name (an alternate version of The Katzenjammer Kids that had resulted from a 1914 lawsuit). The series did not do well. Consequently, Hanna was demoted to a story man and the series was canceled.

Hanna's desk at MGM was opposite that of Joseph Barbera, who had previously worked at Terrytoons. The two quickly realized they would make a good team. By 1939 they had solidified a partnership that would last over 60 years. Hanna and Barbera worked alongside animation director Tex Avery, who had created Daffy Duck and Bugs Bunny for Warner Bros. and directed Droopy cartoons at MGM.

== Tom and Jerry ==
In 1940, Hanna and Barbera jointly directed Puss Gets the Boot, which was nominated for an Academy Award for Best (Cartoon) Short Subject. The studio wanted a diversified cartoon portfolio, so despite the success of Puss Gets the Boot, Hanna and Barbera's supervisor, Fred Quimby, did not want to produce more cat and mouse cartoons. Surprised by the success of Puss Gets the Boot, Hanna and Barbera ignored Quimby's resistance and continued developing the cat-and-mouse theme. By this time, however, Hanna wanted to return to working for Ising, to whom he felt very loyal. Hanna and Barbera met with Quimby, who discovered that although Ising had taken sole credit for producing Puss Gets the Boot, he never actually worked on it. Quimby, who had wanted to start a new animation unit independent of Ising, then gave Hanna and Barbera permission to pursue their cat-and-mouse idea. The result was their most famous creation, Tom and Jerry.

Modeled after the Puss Gets the Boot characters with slight differences, the series followed Jerry, the rodent who continually outwitted his feline foe, Tom. Hanna said they settled on the cat and mouse theme for this cartoon because: "We knew we needed two characters. We thought we needed conflict, and chase and action. And a cat after a mouse seemed like a good, basic thought." The revamped characters first appeared in 1941's The Midnight Snack. Over the next 17 years Hanna and Barbera worked almost exclusively on Tom and Jerry, directing more than 114 highly popular cartoon shorts. During World War II they also made animated training films.

Tom and Jerry relied mostly on motion instead of dialog. Despite its popularity, Tom and Jerry has often been criticized as excessively violent. The series won its first Academy Award for the 11th short, The Yankee Doodle Mouse (1943)—a war-time adventure. Tom and Jerry was ultimately nominated for 13 Academy Awards, winning seven. No other character-based theatrical animated series has won more awards, nor has any other series featuring the same characters. Tom and Jerry also made guest appearances in several of MGM's live-action films, including Anchors Aweigh (1945) and Invitation to the Dance (1956) with Gene Kelly, and Dangerous When Wet (1953) with Esther Williams.

Quimby accepted each Academy Award for Tom and Jerry without inviting Hanna and Barbera onstage. The cartoons were also released with Quimby listed as the sole producer, following the same practice for which he had condemned Ising. When Quimby retired in late 1955, Hanna and Barbera were placed in charge of MGM's animation division. As the studio began to lose more revenue due to television, MGM soon realized that re-releasing old cartoons was far more profitable than producing new ones. In 1957, MGM ordered Hanna and Barbera's business manager to close the cartoon division and lay off everyone by a phone call. Hanna and Barbera found the no-notice closure puzzling because Tom and Jerry had been so successful.

== Television ==
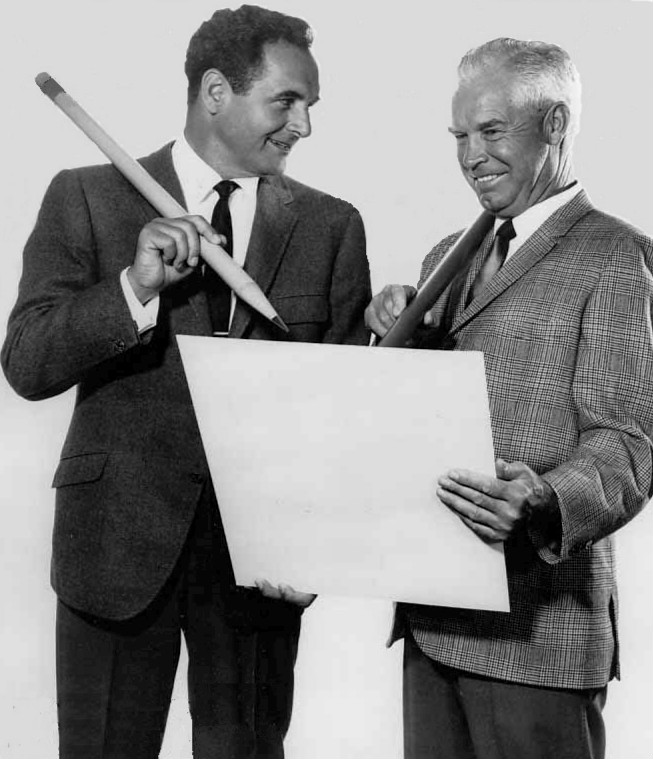
Hanna (right) and Joseph Barbera from a television special for the premiere of their new Secret Squirrel/Atom Ant television program in 1965

During his last year at MGM, Hanna branched out into television, forming the short-lived company Shield Productions with fellow animators Mike Lah and Jay Ward, who had created the series Crusader Rabbit. Their partnership soon ended, and in 1957 Hanna reteamed with Joseph Barbera to produce cartoons for television and theatrical release. The two brought different skills to the company. Barbera was a skilled gag writer and sketch artist, while Hanna had a gift for timing, story construction, and recruiting top artists. Major business decisions would be made together, though each year the title of president alternated between them.

A coin toss determined that Hanna would have precedence in the naming of the new company, first called H-B Enterprises but soon changed to Hanna-Barbera Productions. Barbera and Hanna's MGM colleague George Sidney, the director of Anchors Aweigh, became the third partner and business manager in the company, and arranged a deal for distribution and working capital with Screen Gems, the television division of Columbia Pictures, who took part ownership of the new studio.

The first offering from the new company was The Ruff & Reddy Show, a series which detailed the friendship between a dog and cat. Despite a lukewarm response for their first theatrical venture, Loopy De Loop, Hanna-Barbera soon established themselves with two successful television series: The Huckleberry Hound Show and The Yogi Bear Show. A 1960 survey showed that half of the viewers of Huckleberry Hound were adults. This prompted the company to create a new animated series, The Flintstones.

A parody of The Honeymooners, the new show followed a typical Stone Age family with home appliances, talking animals, and celebrity guests. With an audience of both children and adults, The Flintstones became the first animated prime-time show to be a hit. Fred Flintstone's signature exclamation "yabba dabba doo" soon entered everyday usage, and the show boosted the studio to the top of the TV cartoon field. The company later produced a space-age version of The Flintstones, known as The Jetsons. Although both shows reappeared in the 1970s and 1980s, The Flintstones was far more popular.

By the late 1960s, Hanna-Barbera Productions was the most successful television animation studio in the business. The Hanna-Barbera studio produced over 3,000 animated half-hour television shows. Among the more than 100 cartoon series and specials they produced were: Atom Ant, Augie Doggie and Doggie Daddy (an imitation of the earlier Spike and Tyke MGM cartoons), Jonny Quest, Josie and the Pussycats, Magilla Gorilla, Pixie and Dixie and Mr. Jinks, Quick Draw McGraw, and Top Cat. Top Cat was based on Phil Silvers's character Sgt. Bilko, though it has been erroneously reported that Sgt. Bilko was the basis for Yogi Bear. The Hanna-Barbera studio also produced Scooby-Doo (1969–1991) and The Smurfs (1981–1989). The company also produced animated specials based on Alice in Wonderland, Jack and the Beanstalk, Cyrano de Bergerac, as well as the feature-length film Charlotte's Web (1973).

As popular as their cartoons were with 1960s audiences, they were disliked by artists. Television programs had lower budgets than theatrical animation, and this economic reality caused many animation studios to go out of business in the 1950s and 1960s, putting many people in the industry out of work. Hanna-Barbera was key in the development of limited animation, which allowed television animation to be more cost-effective, but also reduced quality. Hanna and Barbera had first experimented with these techniques in the early days of Tom and Jerry.

To reduce the cost of each episode, shows often focused more on character dialogue than detailed animation. The number of drawings for a seven-minute cartoon decreased from 14,000 to nearly 2,000, and the company implemented innovative techniques such as rapid background changes to improve viewing. Reviewers criticized the change from vivid, detailed animation to repetitive movements by two-dimensional characters. Barbera once said that their choice was to adapt to the television budgets or change careers. The new style did not limit the success of their animated shows, enabling Hanna–Barbera to stay in business, providing employment to many who would otherwise have been out of work. Limited animation became the standard for television animation, and continues to be used today in television programs such as The Simpsons, SpongeBob SquarePants, and South Park.

In 1966, Hanna-Barbera Productions was sold to Taft Broadcasting (renamed Great American Communications in 1987) for $12 million. Hanna and Barbera remained at the head of the company until 1991. At that point, the company was sold to the Turner Broadcasting System for an estimated $320 million, which itself merged with Time Warner, owners of Warner Bros., in 1996. This began a close association with the Cartoon Network. Hanna and Barbera continued to advise their former company and periodically worked on new Hanna-Barbera shows, including The Cartoon Cartoon Show series and hit silver screen versions of The Flintstones (1994) and Scooby-Doo (2002).

== Death ==
Hanna died of esophageal cancer at his home in North Hollywood, Los Angeles, California, on March 22, 2001, at the age of 90.

== Legacy ==
Most of the cartoons Hanna and Barbera created revolved around close friendship or partnership; this theme is evident with Yogi Bear and Boo Boo, Fred Flintstone and Barney Rubble, Ruff and Reddy, The Jetsons family, and the friends in Scooby-Doo. These may have been a reflection of the close business friendship and partnership that Hanna and Barbera shared for almost 60 years. Professionally, they balanced each other's strengths and weaknesses very well, but Hanna and Barbera traveled in completely different social circles. Hanna's personal friends primarily included other animators. Barbera tended to socialize with Hollywood celebrities.

Their division of work roles complemented each other but they rarely talked outside of work, since Hanna was interested in the outdoors and Barbera liked beaches, good food and drinks. In their long partnership, in which they worked with over 2,000 animated characters, Hanna and Barbera rarely exchanged a cross word. Barbera said: "We understood each other perfectly, and each of us had deep respect for the other's work."

Hanna is considered one of the all-time great animators and on a par with Tex Avery. Hanna and Barbera were among the most successful animators on the cinema screen and successfully adapted to the change television brought to the industry. Leonard Maltin says the Hanna–Barbera team "[may] hold a record for producing consistently superior cartoons using the same characters year after year—without a break or change in routine. Their characters are not only animated superstars, but also a very beloved part of American pop culture". They are often considered as Walt Disney's only rivals as cartoonists.

Hanna and Barbera had a lasting impact on television animation. Cartoons they created often make greatest lists. Many of their characters have appeared in film, books, toys, and other media. During the 1960s their TV shows had a worldwide audience of over 300 million people and have since been translated into more than 20 languages. The works of Hanna and Barbera also have been recognized for their music, such as The Cat Concerto (1946) and Johann Mouse (1952), called "masterpieces of animation" in part due to their use of classical music.

In all, the Hanna–Barbera team won seven Academy Awards and eight Emmy Awards, including the 1960 award for The Huckleberry Hound Show, which was the first Emmy awarded to an animated series. They also won these awards: Golden Globe for Television Achievement (1960), Golden IKE Award—Pacific Pioneers in Broadcasting (1983), Pioneer Award—Broadcast Music Incorporated (1987), Iris Award—NATPE Men of the Year (1988), Licensing Industry Merchandisers' Association Award for Lifetime Achievement (1988), Governors Award of the Academy of Television Arts and Sciences (1988), Jackie Coogan Award for Outstanding Contribution to Youth through Entertainment Youth in Film (1988), Frederic W. Ziv Award for Outstanding Achievement in Telecommunications—Broadcasting Division College—Conservatory of Music University of Cincinnati (1989), stars on the Hollywood Walk of Fame (1976), several Annie Awards, several environmental awards, and were recipients of numerous other accolades prior to their induction into the Television Hall of Fame in 1994. In March 2005, the Academy of Television Arts & Sciences and Warner Bros. Animation dedicated a wall sculpture at the Television Academy's Hall of Fame Plaza in North Hollywood to Hanna and Barbera.

== See also ==
- Golden age of American animation
- Tom and Jerry filmography
- List of works produced by Hanna-Barbera Productions
- Peace on Earth (remade by Hanna and Barbera as Good Will to Men)
- Tom and Jerry awards and nominations
- Tom and Jerry: The Movie
