= Fred Quimby =

American animation producer (1886–1965)

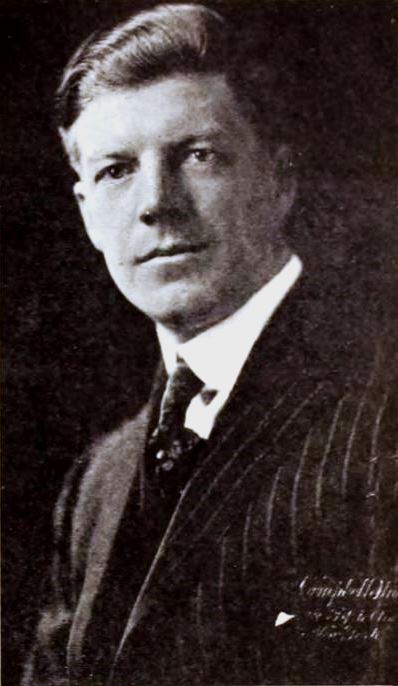
- Quimby in 1920
- Born: Frederick Clinton Quimby; July 31, 1886; Minneapolis, Minnesota, U.S.
- Died: September 16, 1965 (aged 79); Santa Monica, California, U.S.
- Occupation: Animation producer
- Years active: 1921–1955
- Spouse: Sue Quimby (m. 1923; died 1954)

Frederick Clinton "Fred" Quimby (July 31, 1886 – September 16, 1965) was an American animation producer best known for producing the Tom and Jerry cartoon series, for which he won seven Academy Awards for Best Animated Short Films. He was the executive in charge of the Metro-Goldwyn-Mayer cartoon department, which included, among others and at various times, animators and directors Hugh Harman, Rudolf Ising, Tex Avery, Michael Lah, William Hanna and Joseph Barbera, the creators of Tom and Jerry. MGM's cartoon characters included Droopy, Butch Dog, Barney Bear, and others, and they also released multiple one-shot cartoons.

== Life and career ==
Quimby was born in Minneapolis, Minnesota, and started his career as a journalist. In 1907, he managed a film theater in Missoula, Montana. Later, he worked at Pathé, and became a member of the board of directors before leaving in 1921 to become an independent producer. He was hired by Fox Film in 1924, and moved to MGM in 1927 to head its short features department. In 1937, he was assigned to create MGM's animation department, producing the unsuccessful The Captain and the Kids series before he was forced to rehire his predecessors Hugh Harman and Rudolf Ising. The studio benefited from Harman and Ising's presence, hiring former Harman-Ising Productions staff as well as animators from Terrytoons as its films became more successful.

In 1939, William Hanna and Joseph Barbera presented Quimby with a proposal for a series of cartoons featuring a cat and a mouse. Although he had no interest in the idea, Quimby approved, and the result was Puss Gets the Boot, which was nominated for an Academy Award. Initially, he refused to pursue more Cat and Mouse cartoons after Puss Gets the Boot. However, following the critical and financial success of that cartoon, he agreed to make Tom and Jerry an official cartoon of the MGM cartoon department.

As producer, Quimby became a multiple recipient of the Academy Award for Animated Short Film for the Tom and Jerry films, though he never invited Hanna and Barbera onstage when he accepted the awards. His name became well known due to its prominence in the credits of MGM's cartoons starting from 1946, appearing alone in the final title card slide before the beginning of the cartoon proper.

Quimby took sole credit for approving and producing the Tom and Jerry series, but was not involved in the creative process and had a difficult relationship with animators, including Hanna and Barbera, who believed that Quimby was not fit for a real animation leader:

...unfortunately for a cartoon producer, [he had] no sense of humor to call upon... He knew nothing of animation and cartoons were a strange thing to him. Cast in the role of high school principal opposite the animators' boyish enthusiasms, he acted as liaisons between them and the front office, usually it seemed, turning down requests for bigger budgets, raises and special dispensations of funds.

After the production of Good Will to Men (a remake of Peace on Earth), Quimby retired from MGM in May 1955, with Hanna and Barbera assuming his role as co-heads of the studio and taking over the production title for the Tom and Jerry shorts.

Despite its success with Hanna and Barbera's releases, MGM assumed that re-releasing old cartoons would be more profitable, and the cartoon division was closed in 1957. MGM would later contract first Gene Deitch and then Chuck Jones to produce more Tom and Jerry shorts through their own studios during the 1960s.

Quimby died of a heart attack in Santa Monica, California on September 16, 1965, about seven weeks after his 79th birthday, and was buried at Forest Lawn Memorial Park in Glendale, California.

== Academy Award credits ==
- Nominated for Best Animated Short Subject 1940: Puss Gets the Boot – producer (with Rudolf Ising)
- Winner Best Animated Short Subject 1940: The Milky Way – producer (with Rudolf Ising)
- Nominated for Best Animated Short Subject 1941: The Night Before Christmas – producer
- Nominated for Best Animated Short Subject 1941: The Rookie Bear – producer
- Nominated for Best Animated Short Subject 1942: Blitz Wolf – producer
- Winner Best Animated Short Subject 1943: The Yankee Doodle Mouse – producer
- Winner Best Animated Short Subject 1944: Mouse Trouble – producer
- Winner Best Animated Short Subject 1945: Quiet Please! – producer
- Winner Best Animated Short Subject 1946: The Cat Concerto – producer
- Nominated for Best Animated Short Subject 1947: Dr. Jekyll and Mr. Mouse – producer
- Winner Best Animated Short Subject 1948: The Little Orphan – producer
- Nominated for Best Animated Short Subject 1949: Hatch Up Your Troubles – producer
- Nominated for Best Animated Short Subject 1951: Jerry's Cousin – producer
- Winner Best Animated Short Subject 1952: The Two Mouseketeers – producer
- Winner Best Animated Short Subject 1953: Johann Mouse – producer
- Nominated for Best Animated Short Subject 1953: Little Johnny Jet – producer
- Nominated for Best Animated Short Subject 1954: Touché, Pussy Cat! – producer
- Nominated for Best Animated Short Subject 1955: Good Will to Men – producer (with William Hanna & Joseph Barbera)
