= Van Des Autels =

American radio and television announcer

- Born: Richard Van Tassel Des Autels; December 11, 1910; Paragould, Arkansas, U.S.
- Died: September 2, 1968 (aged 57); North Hollywood, California, U.S.
- Spouses: Patricia Lucille Burnett; 1931 – 1941; Betty Jane McPherson (née Sheffer); 1943 – 1968
- Career
- Show: Skippy Hollywood Theatre
- Station(s): KTSA, San Antonio, KTSM, El Paso; KTAR-TV, Phoenix

Richard Van Tassel Des Autels(December 11, 1910 – September 2, 1968) was an American film actor, radio announcer, and television news anchor.

== Early life and career ==
The only child of James A. Des Autels and Phoebe Van Tassel, he was born in Paragould, Arkansas. The family later relocated to Portsmouth, Virginia and, in 1923, to El Paso, Texas. Attending El Paso High School, Des Autels excelled at track and field and well as theatre, his creative output including a chalk talk staged during his freshman year, and, two years later, the libretto for a two-act comic opera entitled Brutuspanto, in which he also costarred with, among others, Harry Hickox.

Following his graduation, Des Autels worked as program director at KTSA in San Antonio, and later at KTSM in El Paso.

In 1941, along with Mike Frankovich, Don Thompson and others, Des Autel provided play-by-play coverage on NBC Blue Network's PCPFL broadcasts. The following year, he hosted I Solemnly Swear, a daily, 15-minute U.S. Navy recruiting program, on KFAC in Los Angeles.

In 1947, Frank Graham and Des Autels co-hosted a well-received listener-participation giveaway show entitled Three Alarm.

In 1948, Des Autels collaborated with producer-director Jerry Fairbanks, providing narration for NBC's Television Close-Ups, a series of 26 five-minute mini-documentaries, dealing primarily with historical subjects.

From 1949 to 1950, Des Autels teamed with producer-director Les Mitchel and composer Del Castillo, serving as announcer—aka "Van, the Skippy Man"—on the dramatic anthology series Skippy Hollywood Theatre. He was also the featured actor on the 2/13/49 episode, entitled "Double Talk".

From 1961 through 1967, Des Autels was the news anchor at KTAR-TV in Phoenix.

== Personal life and death ==
Des Autels was married at least twice; to Patricia Lucille Burnett from 1931 until at least 1938, and, from October 1943 until his death, to Betty Jane McPherson (née Sheffer).

On September 2, 1968, three days after being admitted to the U.S. Veterans Hospital in North Hollywood, Des Autels died of undisclosed causes, although the Associated Press did note that he had moved from Phoenix to Los Angeles the previous year "for treatment of a chronic throat ailment."

== Filmography ==
=== Film ===
- Twentieth Century Vikings (short subject, 1947), as himself
- Willie and Joe Back at the Front (1952), as Lieutenant colonel
- Bloodhounds of Broadway (1952), as Upstate senator
- How to Marry a Millionaire (1953), as Best man
- The Robe (1953), as Chamberlain
- The Crooked Web (1955), as Tom Jackson

=== Television ===
- The Lone Ranger (1953), episode "The Devil's Bog" – Grant Huston (as Van Desautels)
- Combat Sergeant (1956), 7/26/56 episode "Destined for Death" - President of the Court
