= Personal Appearance =

Personal Appearance may refer to:

- Personal appearance
- Personal Appearance (play), a 1934 stage comedy by Lawrence Riley
- Personal Appearance (album), a 1957 album by Sonny Stitt
- Personal Appearance Theater, an American television anthology series
