= Skippy Hollywood Theatre =

American radio dramatic anthology program

Skippy Hollywood Theatre is an American radio dramatic anthology program that began as a syndicated series and later was broadcast on CBS from December 1, 1949, through September 21, 1950.

== Origin ==
Rosenfield Packing Company initially ventured into radio as an advertising medium for its Skippy peanut butter when it sponsored Superman in Fresno, California, and San Francisco. After that start, it added half-sponsorship of Superman in Los Angeles. Successful results led the company to seek to sponsor the program in other markets, but none were available. The company then worked with its advertising agency "to develop a program which would be reasonable in cost, would belong to Skippy, and would permit unlimited expansion as Rosefield grew."

The manufacturer and the agency consulted with C. P. MacGregor, who had experience in producing radio transcriptions. He suggested that the company create a 30-minute dramatic program in Hollywood using "minor screen names and experienced radio talent". The result was Skippy Hollywood Theatre. Plans called for Skippy to sponsor the show in areas in which it was distributed, while it would be made available (without Skippy in the title) to non-competing advertisers where Skippy was not distributed. With few exceptions, the show "never entered a market until good evening time on a top-rated station was available."

The trade publication Variety reported in November 1945 that Skippy Hollywood Theatre was being heard on more 50,000-watt radio stations west of Chicago than any other program. It added that the show might be the only recorded program "heard regularly week in and week out from WOR, New York, to KGMB, Honolulu."

== Overview ==
Skippy Hollywood Theatre presented original 30-minute dramas. Its format was modeled after that of Lux Radio Theatre, and it was so similar that some people called the show "the poor man's Lux". MacGregor was the original host, with Les Mitchel as host later. Van Des Autels was the announcer.

Actors who appeared on the program "who were still unknowns when 'Skippy' handed them parts" included Vanessa Brown, Peggy Knudsen and Gale Storm. Equally obscure—at least to American listeners—were the Abbey Theatre Players of Dublin, who made their American radio debut on December 29, 1949 with "The Great Emptiness" (the second of six consecutive episodes recorded when Mitchel was in London earlier that year), featuring, among others, Dermot Walsh and Sheila Manahan. The first of those six episodes was an adaptation of Charles Dickens' A Christmas Carol, whose cast included Alec Guinness, Jean Simmons, John Mills, Dirk Bogarde, Googie Withers, and Derek Bond. Others featured in the London episodes include Michael Redgrave, Clive Brook, and Margaret Lockwood, as well as American expatriates Bebe Daniels, Ben Lyon and Barbara Lyon.

Another notable debut aired in April 1944, when New York Yankees centerfielder Joe DiMaggio appeared alongside then popular child actor Dix Davis in the episode, "One Hit—Two Errors".

New futures are predicted for Joe DiMaggio, the baseball son of California dear to the hearts of the Yanks and now on duty with the Army! Come curtain time for Skippy Hollywood Theater tonight, Joe becomes a Thespian. Batting the 'clean-up' spot in the radio drama, 'One Hit, Two Errors,' Joe's first dramatic appearance is sure to endear him even further to baseball fans.

== Episodes ==
=== Syndicated ===
Partial List of Episodes of Skippy Hollywood Theatre
Date	Episode	Actor(s)
November 15, 1942	"Murder for Fun"	Gale Page
January 16, 1943	"Meet Mrs. Chandler"	Ona Munson
January 18, 1943	"Wagon Wheels Rolling"	Roy Rogers
March 10, 1943	"Kathrine of the Bridle Bit"	Anita Louise
March 19, 1943	"Little Miss Fortune"	Elaine Barrymore
March 24, 1943	"Taxi, Mister?"	Isabel Jewell
April 2, 1943	"The Seal of the Pharoah" [sic]	Gale Page
April 9, 1943	"Cloud Seventeen"	Ona Munson
April 18, 1943	"Marriage for Wages"	Gale Page
June 12, 1943	"Ashes of Victory"	Anita Louise
October 17, 1943	"Emotions for Sale"	Anita Louise
November 7, 1943	"Snow Man"	Anita Louise
November 21, 1943	"Young Lady, Be Good"	Jane Withers
December 19, 1943	"Blessed Are They"	Roddy McDowell
January 9, 1944	"The Peacock Screen"	Annabella
April 16, 1944	"Crichton Plays Cupid"	Eric Blore
April 22, 1944	"One Hit—Two Errors"	Joe DiMaggio, Dix Davis
April 23, 1944	"Understudy"	John Sutton
May 28, 1944	"Mary, Mary, Quite Contrary"	Margo
June 4, 1944	"Love Divided by Two"	Jon Hall
June 18, 1944	"Love Pays Five to Two"	Carole Landis
July 9, 1944	"The Silver Gown"	Ruth Chatterton
October 8, 1944	"Strange Journey"	Vincent Price
November 5, 1944	"Every Time It Rains"	Edward Everett Horton
November 9, 1945	"Two Hearts in Pigskin"	Charles Starrett, Rosemary Reddins, Robert Clarke, Tyler McVey, Harold Cowan
October 4, 1947	"Return to America"	Ginger Rogers
October 24, 1947	"Pranks for Parents"	Bebe Daniels, Ben Lyon, Barbara Lyon, Richard Lyon
December 17, 1947	"The Heart Remembers"	Patricia Morison
September 24, 1948	"Angelica"	Victor Mature
February 23, 1949	"The Man From Jamestown"	Basil Rathbone
April 1, 1949	"Mr. God Johnson"	Peter Lorre, Lurene Tuttle, Charlie Lung, Earl Lee, Herb Butterfield
July 18, 1949	"Death Accidental"	Marie Windsor
November 24, 1949	"Song of Thanksgiving"	Stephen McNally

=== CBS ===
Partial List of Episodes of Skippy Hollywood Theatre on CBS
Date	Episode	Actor(s)
December 1, 1949	"Something Special"	Marjorie Reynolds
December 8, 1949	"London Legend"	Jane Wyatt
December 15, 1949	"Best Performance"	Les Mitchel
December 22, 1949	"A Christmas Carol"	John Mills, Jean Simmons, Googie Withers, Alec Guinness, John McCullum, Derek Bond and Dirk Bogarde
December 29, 1949	"The Great Emptiness"	Maureen Balaney, Dermot Walsh, Sheila Manahan, Joyce Chanceller, and Elizabeth Erskine
January 5, 1950	"Billy and the Bride"	Jean Simmons
January 12, 1950	"Rappaccini's Daughter"	Michael Redgrave
January 19, 1950	"It's Not Cricket"	Bebe Daniels, Ben Lyon, Barbara Lyon, and Richard Lyon
January 26, 1950	"Thought"	Clive Brook
February 2, 1950	"The Coming of Mr. Snover"	Victor Moore
February 9, 1950	"Trudy and the Quiet Life"	Barbara Fuller
February 16, 1950		
February 23, 1950	"Mulligan the Mighty"	James Gleason
March 2, 1950	"Flash in the Pan"	Michael O'Shea
March 9, 1950	"When the Wind Blows"	Preston Foster
March 16, 1950	"The Tender Heart"	Ella Raines
March 23, 1950	"And the River Laughed"	John Carroll
March 30, 1950	"Love Come Stealing"	Virginia O'Brien
April 6, 1950	"The Terrible Meek"	Les Mitchel
April 13, 1950	"Seven Seas to Danger"	Brian Donlevy
April 20, 1950	"A Dime a Dozen"	Gale Storm
April 27, 1950	"Bid for Fame"	John Sutton
May 4, 1950	"Show Business"	Bill Shirley, Gale Robbins
May 11, 1950	"Help Wanted—Murderer"	John Howard
May 18, 1950	"The Tale of the Mermaid"	Irene Hervey, Francis X. Bushman
May 25, 1950	"No More Diplomacy"	Allan Jones, Lurene Tuttle, Herbert Rawlinson, Henry Sharp
June 1, 1950	No broadcast (Preempted by Hallmark Playhouse)	
June 8, 1950	"Shadow Life"	Rhonda Fleming
June 15, 1950	"A Poltergeist for Harry"	Edmond O'Brien
June 22, 1950	"The Blue Chair"	Vanessa Brown
June 29, 1950	"The Other Side of the Moon"	Ann Dvorak
July 6, 1950	"The Throwback"	Bobby Driscoll
July 13, 1950	"The Big Leaguer"	Bill Lundigan
July 20, 1950	"Perfect Gentleman"	Les Mitchel
July 27, 1950	"Short Story"	Joan Bennett
August 3, 1950	"The Hunt"	Mercedes McCambridge
August 10, 1950	"Wild Horse in the Town"	Dan Duryea
August 17, 1950	"The Truth Pays Off"	Meg Randall
August 24, 1950	"Detour"	Pat O'Brien
August 31, 1950	"Farewell to Birdie McKeever"	Gloria Grahame
September 7, 1950	"To the Bitter End"	Natalie Wood
September 14, 1950	"A Date for Agnes"	Wayne Morris
September 21, 1950	"Stormbound"	Les Mitchel, Lurene Tuttle

== Production ==
First MacGregor and then Mitchel produced and directed the series. MacGregor left after a disagreement over proposed changes. Under Mitchel's leadership, the host's role was diminished, and an emphasis was put on better-known performers and better scripts. The CBS version was broadcast on Thursdays from 10:30 to 11 p.m. Eastern Time. When the program moved to CBS, it had already received high ratings on the West Coast. The syndicated version was broadcast in more than 55 markets at the time of the shift to CBS.

Mahlon Merrick and Del Castillo directed the music. Writers included Roger Quayle Denny and True Eames Boardman. Some scripts came from amateur writers, including students in evening high schools in Hollywood. Mitchel read scripts submitted from across the United States and from other countries. He acknowledged that some of the submissions were bad, but he said, "I hit the jackpot often enough to make it pay."

When Rosefield Packing Company canceled the series, it planned to shift the funds previously allocated to the program to "an extensive national spot and program campaign in both radio and TV".

== Critical response ==
A review of the episode "Two Hearts in Pigskin" in the trade publication Variety compared the show favorably to other radio dramatic anthologies of that era. It noted that MacGregor "knows dramatic values" and that Hooper ratings indicated his success in providing good programs within budget constraints.

Radio historian John Dunning described Skippy Hollywood Theatre as "a slick show, the equal of many network series". One contemporaneous critic, Bill Bird of the Pasadena Independent, likewise lauded Mitchel's resourcefulness in putting out a polished product while also seeing the program as emblematic of the industry-wide transition from "live" to "canned" entertainment.

[Mitchel] attributes part of the program's success to the fact that, being transcribed, scenes that don't come out right the first time can be redone and spliced into the tape and some of which are then taken off on transcription discs for presentation over the air. What this all adds up to is that the customers apparently care little whether it is 'live' or 'canned' if it is good entertainment.
