= Madelon Baker =

American record producer, singer and actress (1927–1999)

- Born: Georgia Madelon Baker; 1910 or 1911; Marion, Illinois, U.S.
- Died: February 26, 1999 (aged 88); Laguna Hills, California, U.S.
- Other names: Madelon Grayson, Madelon Mitchel, C. Madelon Baker
- Education: Wayne State University, Northwestern University
- Occupations: Record producer; music publisher; actress; singer; model
- Spouses: Carl Grayson (né Graub) (m. 1933; div. 1940); Les Mitchel (m. 1942; div. 1952); Jackson Correll Baker (m. 1956; died 1975)

Georgia Madelon Baker (1910 or 1911 – February 26, 1999) was a record producer, music publisher, actress and singer, known for her role in launching singer-songwriter Jimmy Webb's career, and her work with Gospel, R&B and doo wop artists such as Cassietta George, Ron Kenoly and the Paradons. As an actress, she performed in the world premiere of the John Cage/Kenneth Patchen radio play The City Wears a Slouch Hat, and had substantial roles in both the short-lived Gasoline Alley film series and the much-ballyhooed 1955 short subject, The Great Adventure, commemorating the 50th anniversary of Rotary International.

== Early life ==
A native of Marion, Illinois, Baker was the youngest of five daughters born to Fannie Elizabeth Bateman and George Christie Baker, a coal miner who died in 1924 at age 54. Shortly thereafter, the family moved to Highland Park, Michigan and Baker began modeling. She later attended Wayne State University before transferring to Northwestern.

== Career ==
By the following decade, Baker was appearing on radio in such series as The Lone Ranger and The Romance of Helen Trent, as well as becoming one of the featured vocalists for bandleaders Henry Busse and Johnny Hamp, as well as her then-husband Carl Grayson (né Graub). (Note: Oddly enough, Baker was just one of two Madelon Bakers performing with big bands during this period; moreover, both resided within the Detroit urban area. Baker's namesake/neighbor—full name Madelon Cressence Baker—resided in Detroit proper and, unlike her Illinois-born counterpart, had done so her entire life; notable credits include gigs with Johnny DiCicco, Bob Chester and her husband, saxophonist/bandleader Bob Carney. Also helping to distinguish between the two is the fact that during her career, Madelon C. Baker is consistently referred to in Detroit newspapers as "blond Madelon Baker," an assertion corroborated by a good number of images also found in those papers, all of which clearly differentiate her from her red-haired, Illinois-born contemporary.)

On May 31, 1942, on WBBM in Chicago, under the direction of her soon-to-be husband Les Mitchel, Baker—as Madelon Grayson—co-starred with Les Tremayne, Forrest Lewis, Jonathan Hole, Frank Dane, and John Larkin in Columbia Workshop's world premiere presentation of poet Kenneth Patchen's radio play The City Wears a Slouch Hat, accompanied by a five-member percussion ensemble performing John Cage's score, conducted by the composer. Later that year, Baker and fellow WBBM staffer Jane Webb were among a host of local radio people donating their time and talents to the new serviceman's canteen which opened on Christmas Day under the auspices of the Women's Army Corps.

Baker was fashion coordinator for Marshall Field's in Chicago from 1942 to 1944, at which point she and Mitchel moved to Los Angeles. From 1944 through 1951, she was employed in varying capacities at Les Mitchel Productions; she served variously as producer, secretary-treasurer (as G. Madelon Mitchel) and, on at least one occasion, performer.

In 1955, Baker—as Madelon Mitchell—co-starred with Edward Arnold, Jim Backus, Lyle Talbot, and Sujata Rubener in The Great Adventure, a 29-minute docu-drama commemorating the 50th anniversary of Rotary International, which had its world premiere simultaneously in 80 countries on February 23. Debuting on December 1 of that year and continuing for at least three months, Baker, still billed as Mitchell, hosted a cooking show entitled Camera Kitchen on KHJ-TV in Los Angeles. Among her guests were Barbara Ellen Davenport (wife of college football star Bob Davenport), pioneer TV cook Monty Margetts, and fashion consultant Caroline Leonetti.

In 1959, Baker, together with her husband Jackson Baker, began Audio Arts Inc., a recording studio specializing in R&B and Gospel, performed by artists such as Cassietta George and Ron Kenoly. One notable exception was their much-heralded discovery, singer-songwriter Jimmy Webb, whose first single they recorded and released, and approximately 50 of whose songs—including "Didn't We," "Where's the Playground Susie" and "Galveston"—were published by the Bakers' company, Ja-Ma Music. Another Audio Arts coup was its discovery of the Paradons, resulting in the studio's first hit record (which proved to be the band's only hit), "Diamonds and Pearls".

== Personal life and death ==
Baker was married at least three times. The first two marriages ended in divorce: with violinist/vocalist Carl Graub (aka Grayson) from 1933 to 1940, and with producer Lester Mandiville "Les" Mitchel from 1942 to 1952. By contrast, Baker's final marriage, to her Audio Arts partner/co-founder—and partial namesake—Jackson Correll Baker, lasted from 1956 until his death in 1975.

On February 26, 1999, Baker died of a stroke in Laguna Hills, California.

== Filmography ==
=== Films ===
Year	Title	Role	Notes
1940	Girls of the Road	Annie	As Madelon Grayson
1940	The Secret Seven	Moll	uncredited
1940	Glamour for Sale	Irene	uncredited
1950	Charlie's Haunt	Eve Tannen	
1951	Gasoline Alley	Phyllis Wallet	As Madelon Mitchel
1951	Two Dollar Bettor	Grace Shepard	As Madelon Mitchel
1951	Corky of Gasoline Alley	Phyllis Wallet	As Madelon Mitchel
1953	Never Wave at a WAC	Captain McGrady	Uncredited
1955	The Great Adventure	Mrs. Grayson	As Madelon Mitchell
1955	Ain't Misbehavin'	Mrs. Warden	Uncredited
1956	I've Lived Before	Daisy - Miss Stone's Maid	Uncredited
1957	The Deadly Mantis	Mother	Uncredited

=== Television ===
Year	Title	Role	Notes
1952	Personal Appearance Theater		Episode: "The Haircut" (as Madelon Mitchel)
1955 – 1956	Camera Kitchen	Self - host	13 episodes (as Madelon Mitchel)
1956	Alfred Hitchcock Presents	Doctor's Receptionist	Season 2 Episode 14: "John Brown's Body"
1976	Faith for Today	Nurse	1 episode
1983	Odyssey	Self	1 episode
