= King-Size Canary =

1947 film by Tex Avery

- Original title card for the short
- Directed by: Tex Avery
- Story by: Heck Allen
- Produced by: Fred Quimby
- Starring: Frank Graham; Sara Berner; William Hanna (all uncredited)
- Music by: Scott Bradley
- Animation by: Robert Bentley; Walter Clinton; Ray Abrams
- Layouts by: Walter Clinton (uncredited)
- Backgrounds by: John Didrik Johnsen (uncredited)
- Color process: Technicolor
- Production company: MGM Cartoons
- Distributed by: Metro-Goldwyn-Mayer
- Release date: December 6, 1947
- Running time: 7:55
- Language: English

King-Size Canary is an animated cartoon short that debuted in movie theaters in 1947. It was produced by Metro-Goldwyn-Mayer and directed by Tex Avery. The canary in this short was a primary inspiration for the design of Maurice, a character from The Wacky World of Tex Avery.

== Plot ==
An alley cat searches for food in some garbage cans late at night. Unable to find anything worth his while (the bones he finds are stolen by other alley cats before he can take a bite), he spots a refrigerator inside a house and heads for it. He sneaks onto the property only to wake a sleeping bulldog. The bulldog chases the cat up to the side of the house. The cat quickly pulls out some sleeping pills, putting the dog into a deep sleep.

Once inside, the cat searches for food in the kitchen, but comes up empty. His luck finally changes when he notices a can of cat food. He quickly opens the can and out pops a mouse, who is plopped down onto a dinner plate. The cat is about to dig in with a fork, but the mouse puts a quick stop to that. He says that the cat can't eat him because he has already seen the cartoon they are in, and that he winds up saving the cat's life later. The feline understands, but wants some food as he is starving. The mouse points into the other room and tells him that there is a huge, fat, tasty canary in there. The cat charges out into the other room, stuffs the unseen canary into a sack, and heads back to the kitchen.

The bird is emptied from the sack, to be revealed as scrawny and little. The bird tells the cat, "Well, I've been sick...". Disgusted with the tiny creature at first but still desperate, the cat gets a (literal) brainstorm when he sees a bottle of Jumbo Gro plant growth formula on the shelf. Quickly, he pours some of the formula into the bird and sure enough, the canary grows rapidly in size. But before the cat can take a bite, the bird is already over ten feet tall. The canary takes advantage of his new height and beats up on the cat. The cat turns the tables on the bird and drinks the Jumbo Gro formula himself, increasing in size until he is much bigger than the bird. He tosses the formula out of the window only for it to land in the bulldog's mouth. While the now giant-sized cat chases the slightly smaller canary through the side of the house, the bulldog guzzles down the formula. After a quick run around the block, the cat and canary wind up back outside of the house, where a now gigantic bulldog appears before them. The cat runs away in fear as the bulldog tosses the bottle of Jumbo Gro down the chimney, where it rolls out of the fireplace and straight to the mouse, who is reading a book titled The Lost Squeekend (a play on the 1944 book The Lost Weekend) in the living room. The dog leaps over the house and chases the cat into the city.

Meanwhile, the mouse takes a few sips of the formula, instantly growing to gigantic size. The dog chases the cat through the city, only for the now gargantuan mouse to show up and scare the bulldog away with a simple "Boo!". The mouse, who is as tall as a twenty-story building, reminds the cat that he told him he would save his life. The cat thanks him as the mouse hands the bottle of Jumbo Gro back to him and waddles off. The cat rubs his enormous belly, realizing he is still hungry, then sees the huge mouse waddles off and gets another idea. He suddenly drinks more of the formula and grows even bigger than the mouse. The cat, who is by now one hundred stories tall, chases the giant but smaller mouse through the city and across the country, passing the Grand Canyon, the Hoover Dam and the Rocky Mountains.

The giant mouse hides in a railroad tunnel, losing the cat for a moment. The mouse drinks the Jumbo Gro when the cat isn't paying attention and becomes even bigger than the cat. The mouse starts to beat up on the cat only for the cat to take the formula back and drink it, further increasing his size. The mouse takes it back and drinks more to further increase his size as well. They continue to increase their sizes until they suddenly both come to a stop at the same exact size when they realize that the formula's bottle is empty. They tell the audience that they will have to end the cartoon, now that the formula has run out. They wave goodbye to the audience before the camera pulls back, revealing that they have outgrown the Earth itself and are standing atop the globe.

== Voice Cast ==
All the voice actors are uncredited:

- Frank Graham as The Mouse
- Sara Berner as The Canary (re-used audio from Slap Happy Lion)
  - William Hanna as The Canary screaming (re-used audio from the Tom and Jerry cartoons).

It is currently unconfirmed who voices The Cat, but according to historian Keith Scott it is either Pinto Colvig or Tex Avery.

== Crew ==
- Directed by: Tex Avery
- Animation: Robert Bentley, Walt Clinton, Ray Abrams
- Story: Heck Allen
- Layouts: Walt Clinton
- Backgrounds: John Didrik Johnsen
- Music: Scott Bradley
- Produced by: Fred Quimby

== Reception ==
In 1994, it was voted #10 of the 50 Greatest Cartoons of all time by members of the animation field.
