= The Wacky World of Tex Avery =

French-American animated series

- French: Le Monde fou de Tex Avery
- Genre: Comedy; Slapstick; Adventure
- Created by: Robby London
- Voices of: Billy West; Kathleen Barr; Ian James Corlett; Lee Tockar; Cree Summer; Terry Klassen; Maurice LaMarche; Alec Willows; Phil Hayes; Scott McNeil
- Narrated by: Maurice LaMarche
- Theme music composer: Jacques Offenbach
- Opening theme: "The Wacky World of Tex Avery" (to the tune of Orpheus in the Underworld's Infernal Galop)
- Ending theme: "Infernal Galop"
- Composer: Jean-Michel Guirao
- Countries of origin: France; United States
- Original language: English
- No. of seasons: 1
- No. of episodes: 65 (195 segments)

Production
- Executive producers: Andy Heyward; Michael Malini; Robby London; Christopher Hallowell
- Producers: Eddie Fitzgerald (credited as Eddie Fitzpatrick); Mike Fontanelli (credited as Michael Fauntleroy)
- Running time: 22 minutes (7 minutes per segment)
- Production companies: Les Studios Tex SARL; Telcima S.A.; DIC Productions, L.P.; Milimetros S.A.; The Program Exchange

Original release
- Network: M6 (France); First-run syndication (U.S.)
- Release: September 3 – November 30, 1997

The Wacky World of Tex Avery (French: Le Monde fou de Tex Avery) is an animated television series created by Robby London and co-produced by DIC Productions, L.P., Les Studios Tex SARL, Milimetros, M6 and Telcima.

Both the series and the titular character were named after Tex Avery, an animator who is known for his work at Warner Bros., MGM and Walter Lantz Productions, who had died in 1980, seventeen years before the series' debut. The creator describes the show as "a homage to the brilliant, hilarious and groundbreaking animator Tex Avery and the wonderful squash-and-stretch cartoons of his era". The series was first broadcast on the French channel M6 on September 3, 1997 and later debuted in syndication in the United States on September 29, ending after a single season on November 30 that same year. In the following years since it debuted, The Wacky World of Tex Avery has received overwhelmingly negative reviews and has been described as an "insult" to its namesake's legacy. It was only a minimal hit in international territories where Tex Avery's actual works were lesser-known.

== Segments ==
The series' episodes contain three shorts derived from one of seven segments.

=== Tex Avery ===
This segment series centers on a cowboy named Tex Avery who saves the day and his love interest, Chastity Knott, from his nemesis, Sagebrush Sid.

He was inspired by the Red Hot Ryder character from Buckaroo Bugs, created by Bob Clampett (a fellow animator at Termite Terrace in the 1930s). The theme song is "Home on the Range". If a Tex Avery segment is present in an episode, it is always the first segment.

This segment has 33 shorts in total.

=== Pompeii Pete ===
Pete is a diminutive, bumbling Roman centurion from Pompeii who was buried in lava from the eruption of Mount Vesuvius and two thousand years later breaks free from his preserved state in the modern world. His over-interpretive behavior constantly foils the schemes of sleazy conman, Dan.

He was loosely inspired by Shorty from the Famous Studios era of Popeye the Sailor and Manuel from Fawlty Towers, borrowing some inspiration from Encino Man. The theme song is "Tarantella Napoletana".

This segment has 29 shorts in total.

=== Einstone ===
This segment series centers on a brilliant caveman, Ughbert Einstone, who is history's first inventor, and tries to teach his friends how to be civilized through the use of his inventions.

This segment is inspired by The First Bad Man, with Einstone's name being a play on Albert Einstein. The theme song is "If You're Happy and You Know It".

This segment has 26 shorts in total.

=== Genghis & Khannie ===
Genghis the lion is a warlord who leads his barbarian army across the world to conquer in the name of his emperor and often crosses paths with a female panda cub named Khannie, who tends to thwart his plans through her innocent behavior.

Their names are a play on Genghis Khan. Though unconfirmed, Genghis' design is likely based on the lion from the Slap Happy Lion short. In Italy, Genghis was dubbed by Gianluca Iacono that later got fame becoming the dubber of Vegeta from Dragon Ball Z.

This segment has 27 shorts in total.

=== Freddy the Fly ===
A playful, obnoxious, and uncultured housefly named Freddy bothers an obese, lazy, and exceedingly short-tempered billionaire named Amanda Banshee, whose continuous excessive attempts to get rid of him often involve the most extreme of ways.

Freddy was inspired by Homer the Homeless Flea, a character created by Rudolf Ising that Avery later used in his short What Price Fleadom, and comedian Red Skelton's character, Freddy the Freeloader. Freddy and Amanda each have their own themes; Beethoven's "Symphony no. 5" for Freddy and Vivaldi's "The Four Seasons" for Amanda.

This segment has 26 shorts in total.

=== Maurice & Mooch ===
This segment series centers on a young chicken named Maurice Squab who outwits Mooch, a fox constantly trying to eat him.

Maurice's design is based on the canary from King-Size Canary, with his personality influenced by Junior Pig from One Ham's Family. Maurice speaks with a Swedish accent; Mooch has a New York accent, with a voice modeled off Jimmy Durante. The segment's theme is "Home! Sweet Home!". The premise is also likely based on the Baby Huey cartoons from Famous Studios.

This segment has 27 shorts in total.

=== Power Pooch ===
A normal dog gains superpowers after licking a superhero's shoe and becomes a superhero himself, albeit an incompetent one. Along with his cat sidekick, Little Buddy, Power Pooch fights the forces of evil, such as Doctor Hydrant and his henchman, Boney the bone.

This segment is inspired by Paul Terry's Mighty Mouse, and Joe Harris' Underdog, as well as Doug TenNapel's Earthworm Jim.

This segment has 27 shorts in total.

== Cast ==
- Billy West - Tex Avery, Sagebrush Sid and Freddy the Fly
- Kathleen Barr - Chastity Knott
- Ian James Corlett - Ughbert Einstone and Pompeii Pete
- Phil Hayes - Power Pooch
- Terry Klassen - Maurice Squab
- Maurice LaMarche - Mooch (impersonating Jimmy Durante), The Emperor, Mr. Squab, The Narrator and Doctor Hydrant
- Scott McNeil - Amanda Banshee
- Cree Summer - Khannie
- Lee Tockar - Genghis (impersonating Sean Connery) and Little Buddy
- Alec Willows - Dan

== Episodes ==
Current prints of the series have Michel Trouillet, Paul F. Quinn and Daniël Shwall credited as the writers, having been credited on French prints before. Tubi and certain prints on YouTube would also credit Daniël Shwall as director by each episode using the end credits of the first episode, even though each half-hour episode have a different set of end credits. This article goes by the writer credits as seen in the original English prints for the show, seen in the original US airings of each episode, as well as the director credits also from original airings as well as certain modern rereleases.

No.	Title	Directed by	Written by	Original release date
1	"Rodeo, Rodeo, Where for Art Thou Rodeo?"	Daniël Shwall	Henry Gilroy	September 3, 1997
1	"The Dis-Orderly"	Daniël Shwall	Jymn Magon	September 3, 1997
1	"A Bird in the Brain is Worth Two in the Bush"	Daniël Shwall	Jeffrey Scott	September 3, 1997
Tex Avery – Rodeo, Rodeo, Where for Art Thou Rodeo?: Tex and Sid compete with each other to become rodeo clowns at Chastity's rodeo. Pompeii Pete – The Dis-Orderly: Dan fakes injury to get room and board in a hospital, but has the unfortunate luck of Pete being assigned as his orderly. Einstone – A Bird in the Brain is Worth Two in the Bush: Einstone tries to help his Neanderthal contemporaries to get a giant pterosaur egg for breakfast.
2	"The Not-So-Great Train Robbery"	Daniël Shwall	Jymn Magon	September 4, 1997
2	"Humpty Dumpty Had a Great Wall"	Daniël Shwall	Jeffrey Scott	September 4, 1997
2	"Marital Blitz"	Daniël Shwall	Jymn Magon	September 4, 1997
Tex Avery – The Not-So-Great Train Robbery: Sid's attempts to rob a train carrying gold are continuously thwarted by Tex, who was assigned to guard the gold. Genghis & Khannie – Humpty Dumpty Had a Great Wall: Genghis' attempts to get over the Great Wall of China are repeatedly thwarted by Khannie (who innocently believes he wants to play). Freddy the Fly – Marital Blitz: Freddy invites himself to the wedding of Sabrina Holmes and Philip Fenton, and predictably causes Amanda to inadvertently interrupt the ceremony.
3	"Cabin Fever"	Christian Choquet	Mike Fontanelli & Henry Gilroy	September 5, 1997
3	"Cruisin' for a Bruisin'"	Christian Choquet	Jymn Magon	September 5, 1997
3	"Breakfast in Bedlam"	Bill Zeats	Jeffrey Scott	September 5, 1997
Tex Avery – Cabin Fever: In winter, Tex fights to reclaim a cabin from Sid, though both are unaware that it actually belongs to Chastity. Freddy the Fly – Cruisin' for a Bruisin': Freddy disrupts a dinner on a cruise ship which Amanda causes to sink in her attempts to get rid of him. Maurice & Mooch – Breakfast in Bedlam: While Maurice prepares breakfast in bed for his parents, Mooch makes an attempt to make breakfast of him.
4	"Bottleneck Bear"	Christian Choquet	Mike Fontanelli & Henry Gilroy	September 6, 1997
4	"Sitter Jitters"	Daniël Shwall	Jeffrey Scott	September 6, 1997
4	"Flychiatry"	Daniël Shwall	Michael Patrick Dobkins	September 6, 1997
Tex Avery – Bottleneck Bear: Cutting through a mountain pass on his way to see Chastity, Tex has to deal with a bear. Maurice & Mooch – Sitter Jitters: While Maurice's parents are out for the evening, Mooch pretends to be a babysitter so he can eat Maurice. Freddy the Fly – Flychiatry: After a recent incursion with Freddy lands her in a sanitorium, Amanda is convinced by her psychiatrist that the fly doesn't exist.
5	"Driving Mr. Dan"	Christian Choquet	Steve Brasfield	September 7, 1997
5	"Who Kilt the Conqueror"	Christian Choquet	Jeffrey Scott	September 7, 1997
5	"Saur Loser"	Daniël Shwall	Jeffrey Scott	September 7, 1997
Pompeii Pete – Driving Mr. Dan: Dan's drive to the airport becomes complicated by the fact his chauffeur has been replaced by Pete. Genghis & Khannie – Who Kilt the Conqueror: Genghis' attempts to seize a seemingly undefended castle to complete his conquest of Scotland are halted by Khannie's playful behavior. Einstone – Saur Loser: After they are terrorized by a Tyrannosaurus, Einstone and the Neanderthals invent various methods to try to catch it.
6	"Mine, Mine, Mine"	Daniël Shwall	Jymn Magon	September 10, 1997
6	"Stupe De Jour"	Daniël Shwall	Steve Brasfield	September 10, 1997
6	"Teacher's Pest"	Daniël Shwall	Jeffrey Scott	September 10, 1997
Tex Avery – Mine, Mine, Mine: Sid tries various ways to get rid of Tex to have their gold mine all to himself after learning one of them will inherit it if the other passes on. Pompeii Pete – Stupe De Jour: After firing his assistant from his cookery show, Dan gets a replacement in Pete, who might cause his ratings to plummet. Maurice & Mooch – Teacher's Pest: Mooch is in for a rather hard lesson when he attempts to eat Maurice on his first day of school.
7	"Silence of the Lames"	Daniël Shwall	Michael Patrick Dobkins	September 11, 1997
7	"Aloha Oy"	Daniël Shwall	Jeffrey Scott	September 11, 1997
7	"Black and Blue Belt"	Daniël Shwall	Jeffrey Scott	September 11, 1997
Freddy the Fly – Silence of the Lames: Freddy makes Amanda's volunteer job at a library more noisy than she intends it to be. Genghis & Khannie – Aloha Oy: Genghis tries to conquer the islands of Hawaii, but Khannie stands in his way as usual. Maurice & Mooch – Black and Blue Belt: Maurice faces off with Mooch (who tries to pose as Maurice's kung-fu teacher) in a no-holds-barred kung-fu lesson.
8	"Cat Scratch Fervor"	Christian Choquet	Eleanor Burian-Mohr & Steve Pesce	September 12, 1997
8	"Say Goodnight Freddy"	Christian Choquet	Jymn Magon	September 12, 1997
8	"Quiet Please"	Christian Choquet	Chris Otsuki	September 12, 1997
Power Pooch – Cat Scratch Fervor: Power Pooch fights against a cat who has powered himself up with his Power Shoe. Freddy the Fly – Say Goodnight Freddy: Kept up by Amanda's snoring at night, Freddy decides to disrupt her sleep as much as he can. Pompeii Pete – Quiet Please: After checking himself in at a hotel, Dan's sleep gets constantly disrupted by Pete.
9	"Tell-Tale Fly"	Daniël Shwall	Chris Otsuki	September 13, 1997
9	"True or False Alarm"	Daniël Shwall	Jeffrey Scott	September 13, 1997
9	"SSSpeed"	Daniël Shwall	Jymn Magon	September 13, 1997
Freddy the Fly – Tell Tale Fly: After finally killing Freddy once and for all, Amanda ends up being haunted by his ghost. Maurice & Mooch – True or False Alarm: When Maurice visits a fire house to volunteer as a firefighter, Mooch poses as a fireman to try to fire roast him. Power Pooch – SSSpeed: Power Pooch mistakes a crash test bus full of dummies for a driverless bus full of citizens which he ends up sending on a wild ride.
10	"Greek A-Boo"	Christian Choquet	Jeffrey Scott	September 14, 1997
10	"Toothpaste Pete"	Christian Choquet	Drew Daywalt	September 14, 1997
10	"Cave Improvement"	Christian Choquet	Jeffrey Scott	September 14, 1997
Genghis & Khannie – Greek A-Boo: Attempting to conquer Ancient Greece, Genghis' attempts to sneak into the Athenian Palace get thwarted by Khannie. Pompeii Pete – Toothpaste Pete: When Dan enters a dentist's clinic to hide from the authorities, he ends up losing his teeth when Pete gets to work on them. Einstone – Cave Improvement: Einstone tries to teach the Neanderthals about home improvements when their cave roof springs a leak.
11	"A Man Called Horsey"	Daniël Shwall	Don Gillies	September 17, 1997
11	"Neanderthal Mom"	Daniël Shwall	Lane Raichert	September 17, 1997
11	"Toy Store Story"	Daniël Shwall	Jeffrey Scott	September 17, 1997
Tex Avery – A Man Called Horsey: Tex arrives in a town where horses rule the roost (the horses had forced people to switch places after Sid's horse got fed up with the abuse he took as they were being chased by a posse). Einstone – Neanderthal Mom: When Einstone's cavemother comes to stay, he tries to cosmetically change her appearance so she can move in with someone else. Maurice & Mooch – Toy Store Story: Mooch tries to get at Maurice when the young chicken makes a visit to a toy store.
12	"Disasterpiece Theater"	Daniël Shwall	Mike Fontanelli & Henry Gilroy	September 18, 1997
12	"You Take the High Road and I'll Take Cairo"	Daniël Shwall	Jeffrey Scott	September 18, 1997
12	"Caveman and Wife"	Daniël Shwall	Jeffrey Scott	September 18, 1997
Tex Avery – Disasterpiece Theater: After being fed up with their atypical cowboy routines, Chastity forces Tex and Sid to partake in a classy English story. Genghis & Khannie – You Take the High Road and I'll Take Cairo: After Genghis succeeds in conquering Ancient Egypt, he finds his reign as pharaoh threatened by the Princess of Cairo, who happens to be Khannie. Einstone – Caveman and Wife: Einstone competes with a strong caveman over a beautiful cavewoman to prove that brains are a better way to woo a woman than brawn.
13	"What's Yours is Mayan"	Christian Choquet	Jeffrey Scott	September 19, 1997
13	"Wish Upon a Star Traveler"	Christian Choquet	Jeffrey Scott	September 19, 1997
13	"Mile High Fly"	Christian Choquet	Chris Otsuki	September 19, 1997
Genghis & Khannie – What's Yours is Mayan: In search of the Mayans' gold in hopes it will help him conquer the Mayan empire, Genghis learns he must make a sacrifice to a nearby volcano, unless that sacrifice is Khannie. Einstone – Wish Upon a Star Traveler: After an alien ship lands, Einstone and the Neanderthals are put through a series of tests to determine which of them will be worthy to go with the aliens. Freddy the Fly – Mile High Fly: After failing to rid herself of Freddy again, Amanda decides to make a growth spray believing she needs a bigger target to hit.
14	"Gangster Rip"	Daniël Shwall	Jymn Magon	September 20, 1997
14	"Himalaya Down and Die"	Daniël Shwall	Jeffrey Scott	September 20, 1997
14	"The Ugh-Lympic Games"	Daniël Shwall	Jeffrey Scott	September 20, 1997
Pompeii Pete – Gangster Rip: Dan is charged by his boss with teaching his nephew the business, but unfortunately mistakes traveling salesman Pete for said nephew. Genghis & Khannie – Himalaya Down and Die: In search of the city of Shangri-La, Genghis hires a guide to show him the way, but the guide happens to be Khannie. Einstone – The Ugh-Lympic Games: To settle a dispute between the Neanderthals and a group of apes, Einstone comes up with a prehistoric version of the Olympics.
15	"Out of Shape, Out of Mind"	Daniël Shwall	Jeffrey Scott	September 21, 1997
15	"Pain in the Rain Forest"	Daniël Shwall	Jeffrey Scott	September 21, 1997
15	"Bank You Very Much"	Daniël Shwall	Henry Gilroy	September 21, 1997
Einstone – Out of Shape, Out of Mind: After they fail on a hunt, Einstone puts the Neanderthals through an extensive exercise routine. Genghis & Khannie – Pain in the Rain Forest: Genghis' attempts to conquer the tribes of the Amazon repeatedly fall afoul of Khannie, and the local wildlife. Power Pooch – Bank You Very Much: Power Pooch tries to bring a pair of bank robbers to justice, despite the police lieutenant wanting the dog-brained hero to stay out of it.
16	"Virtual Tex"	Daniël Shwall	Don Gillies	September 24, 1997
16	"Chicken Scouts"	Daniël Shwall	Jeffrey Scott	September 24, 1997
16	"Pompeii Away"	Daniël Shwall	Henry Gilroy	September 24, 1997
Tex Avery – Virtual Tex: Tex takes part in an interactive adventure where the audience's choices determine good or bad outcomes, but someone seems to be rigging the votes to the bad outcomes. Maurice & Mooch – Chicken Scouts: Believing he can get a four-for-one, including Maurice, Mooch poses as the Chicken Scouts' scoutmaster. Pompeii Pete – Pompeii Away: After accidentally being cast away from a cruise, Dan ends up on a desert island with Pete, who's insistent on giving him a coconut drink.
17	"Tex-Babies"	Christian Choquet	Michel Trouillet, Paul F. Quinn & Daniël Shwall	September 25, 1997
17	"Gunga Dan"	Christian Choquet	Michel Trouillet, Paul F. Quinn & Daniël Shwall	September 25, 1997
17	"Is There a Doctor in the Cave?"	Christian Choquet	Jeffrey Scott	September 25, 1997
Tex Avery – Tex-Babies: Tex and Sid remember their life stories from before they were born after Chastity calls them out on their constant fighting. Pompeii Pete – Gunga Dan: In India, Dan searches for a rare white tiger, but Pete may ruin his chances. Einstone – Is There a Doctor in the Cave?: After a Neanderthal catches a cold, Einstone decides to teach them a lesson in medical care.
18	"Ever Herd of Cows?"	Christian Choquet	Michel Trouillet, Paul F. Quinn & Daniël Shwall	September 26, 1997
18	"The Return of Dr. Hydrant"	Christian Choquet	Michel Trouillet, Paul F. Quinn & Daniël Shwall	September 26, 1997
18	"Fortunate Fly"	Christian Choquet	Michel Trouillet, Paul F. Quinn & Daniël Shwall	September 26, 1997
Tex Avery – Ever Herd of Cows?: Tex decides to keep a cow so he can start a herd, but Sid tries to rustle it. Power Pooch – The Return of Dr. Hydrant: Dr. Hydrant kidnaps Little Buddy so that he can get rid of his simple-minded adversary once and for all. Freddy the Fly – Fortunate Fly: To try to improve her luck at a casino, Amanda is given a fly on her skin, but said fly happens to be Freddy.
19	"Not Even a Sporting Chance"	Daniël Shwall	Michel Trouillet, Paul F. Quinn & Daniël Shwall	September 27, 1997
19	"Fat Chance"	Daniël Shwall	Michel Trouillet, Paul F. Quinn & Daniël Shwall	September 27, 1997
19	"La Misery"	Daniël Shwall	Michel Trouillet, Paul F. Quinn & Daniël Shwall	September 27, 1997
Tex Avery – Not Even a Sporting Chance: Tex defends his fort against Sagebrush Sid's attempts to capture it for himself. Freddy the Fly – Fat Chance: Amanda is put on a tough exercise routine, made even tougher not so much by being made not to eat as by Freddy's interventions. Power Pooch – La Misery: Power Pooch and Little Buddy try to bodyguard Miss Lotsacash from robbery, but her very poor hearing gives P.P. more than he bargained for.
20	"Caddy Whack"	Christian Choquet	Mike Fontanelli & Lane Reichart	September 28, 1997
20	"Mutts Attacks!"	Christian Choquet	Jymn Magon	September 28, 1997
20	"Dances on Lions"	Christian Choquet	Jeffrey Scott	September 28, 1997
Pompeii Pete – Caddy Whack: Dan's golf game may go over par when his caddy happens to be Pete. Power Pooch – Mutts Attacks!: Power Pooch and Little Buddy take on a pair of aliens, P.P. unaware that the aliens don't mean any harm. Genghis & Khannie – Dances on Lions: Genghis tries to conquer a Native American tribe, but finds himself halted by Khannie and her tribe's chief.
21	"Nice to Canoe You"	Daniël Shwall	Michel Trouillet, Paul F. Quinn & Daniël Shwall	October 1, 1997
21	"Bug to the Future"	Daniël Shwall	Michel Trouillet, Paul F. Quinn & Daniël Shwall	October 1, 1997
21	"Yes, We Have No Electricity"	Daniël Shwall	Michel Trouillet, Paul F. Quinn & Daniël Shwall	October 1, 1997
Tex Avery – Nice to Canoe You: Tex races across water rapids to rescue Chastity from Sid, who wants to marry her, just to get a kiss. Freddy the Fly – Bug to the Future: Freddy accidentally becomes frozen in a freezer and wakes up in the distant future where he bugs a non-violent descendant of Amanda. Maurice & Mooch – Yes, We Have No Electricity: When the power goes out in Maurice's house, Mooch decides to take advantage of the situation to try to eat Maurice.
22	"Fly Incarnation"	Daniël Shwall	Michel Trouillet, Paul F. Quinn & Daniël Shwall	October 2, 1997
22	"Fly Like a Beagle"	Daniël Shwall	Sib Ventress & Tracy Berna	October 2, 1997
22	"The One That Didn't Get Away"	Christian Choquet	Jeffrey Scott	October 2, 1997
Freddy the Fly – Fly Incarnation: Amanda is led to believe that Freddy is in fact a reincarnation of her departed brother. Power Pooch – Fly Like a Beagle: Power Pooch and Little Buddy are at the airport, searching for crime, when they end up on a plane with animal activist terrorists planning to crash the plane into a taxidermy convention. Maurice & Mooch – The One That Didn't Get Away: Mooch intends to catch himself some dinner when Maurice tries to catch a big fish for a competition. NOTE: Subsequent airings since September 11, 2001 replaced "Fly Like a Beagle" with "Power Puppy" due to the episode's similarities to the 9/11 terror attacks.
23	"Fat and Fatter"	Daniël Shwall	David Henry Schneider, Drew Daywalt & Henry Gilroy	October 3, 1997
23	"Cake Me a Bake"	Daniël Shwall	Sib Ventress & Tracy Berna	October 3, 1997
23	"Count Danula"	Daniël Shwall	Henry Gilroy & Mike Fontanelli	October 3, 1997
Tex Avery – Fat and Fatter: Seeing Chastity going out with a fat man, Tex and Sid try fattening themselves up as much as they can. Freddy the Fly – Cake Me a Bake: Amanda makes a cake for a fundraising sale, though Freddy may decide on having it for himself Pompeii Pete – Count Danula: Danula is set on acquiring blood for his family, but Pete inadvertently thwarts him every time.
24	"The Toothless Fairy"	Daniël Shwall	Jeffrey Scott	October 4, 1997
24	"A No Etiquette Barbarian in King Arthur's Court"	Daniël Shwall	Jeffrey Scott	October 4, 1997
24	"Look Who's Ughing"	Daniël Shwall	Jeffrey Scott	October 4, 1997
Maurice & Mooch – The Toothless Fairy: Mooch disguises himself as a tooth fairy so he can sink his own teeth into Maurice. Genghis & Khannie – A No Etiquette Barbarian in King Arthur's Court: After Genghis conquers Camelot and Khannie draws Excalibur from the stone (believing it to be an apple peeler), they face each other in a joust for the sword. Einstone – Look Who's Ughing: Einstone tries to teach a Neanderthal who has been left babysitting his son about proper childcare.
25	"Pony Distress"	Daniël Shwall	Mark Zaslove	October 5, 1997
25	"My Fair Freddy"	Daniël Shwall	Michael Patrick Dobkins	October 5, 1997
25	"Re Pete Customer"	Daniël Shwall	Mike Fontanelli & Henry Gilroy	October 5, 1997
Tex Avery – Pony Distress: Tex works as a Pony Express rider, but Sid is determined to get at his mail. Freddy the Fly – My Fair Freddy: While preparing for a charity ball, Amanda has Freddy sent off to a finishing school, but when he comes back cultured, he turns out to be worse than before. Pompeii Pete – Re Pete Customer: Dan is in for more than a short back and sides when he mistakes Pete (who was remodelling the salon) for a top hairstylist.
26	"A Hunting We Won't Go"	Christian Choquet	Jeffrey Scott	October 8, 1997
26	"Top Gun Shy"	Christian Choquet	Michel Trouillet, Paul F. Quinn & Daniël Shwall	October 8, 1997
26	"Sidekicked"	Christian Choquet	Michel Trouillet, Paul F. Quinn & Daniël Shwall	October 8, 1997
Einstone – A Hunting We Won't Go: After seeing the Neanderthals eat a giant rock, Einstone decides to educate them in proper dinner manners. Pompeii Pete – Top Gun Shy: Dan's patience is tested when he mistakes Pete for his new pilot. Power Pooch – Sidekicked: Dr. Hydrant uses a robotic version of Little Buddy to try to steal the Power Shoe.
27	"The President's Fly"	Christian Choquet	Sib Ventress & Tracy Berna	October 9, 1997
27	"The Long-Awaited Evil Twin Episode"	Christian Choquet	Jymn Magon	October 9, 1997
27	"Donkey Conqueror"	Christian Choquet	Jeffrey Scott	October 9, 1997
Freddy the Fly – The President's Fly: Amanda attends a peace treaty signing with Garbawjia at the White House, but also finds that Freddy is the president's first fly. Power Pooch – The Long-Awaited Evil Twin Episode: Through a freak accident whilst Power Pooch powers himself up, an evil duplicate of himself is born which he must do battle with. Genghis & Khannie – Donkey Conqueror: While trying to conquer Thailand, Genghis meets his match in the form of Khannie's giant gorilla bodyguard, Donkey Conqueror.
28	"Wrapped Up in His Work"	Daniël Shwall	Michel Trouillet, Paul F. Quinn & Daniël Shwall	October 10, 1997
28	"Cyrano De Burg-A-Rock Head"	Daniël Shwall	Michel Trouillet, Paul F. Quinn & Daniël Shwall	October 10, 1997
28	"Terminal Veloci-Pete"	Daniël Shwall	Michel Trouillet, Paul F. Quinn & Daniël Shwall	October 10, 1997
Power Pooch – Wrapped Up in His Work: Power Pooch mistakes a mummy for a bandaged person in need of medical attention. Einstone – Cryano De Burg-A-Rock Head: When a Neanderthal falls in love, Einstone tries to help him turn on the charm to win the apple of his eye over. Pompeii Pete – Terminal Veloci-Pete: Skydiving instructor Dan may lose his mind when Pete repeatedly asks him for payment on a delivery.
29	"Up a Tree Without a Paddle"	Daniël Shwall	David Bleiman Ichioka & Ken Pontac	October 11, 1997
29	"Mechanically Declined"	Daniël Shwall	Jeff Silverman	October 11, 1997
29	"Power Pooch No More"	Daniël Shwall	Michael Patrick Dobkins	October 11, 1997
Tex Avery – Up a Tree Without a Paddle: Tex must protect his mountain forest from being cut down by Sid Bunyan. Pompeii Pete – Mechanically Declined: When Dan's freshly cleaned car breaks down, he's in for more than a tune up from Pete's lack of mechanical know-how. Power Pooch – Power Pooch No More: After believing he has killed Little Buddy, Power Pooch goes to a monastery to become a monk but ends up driving the resident monks to insanity.
30	"Water You Gonna Do?"	Daniël Shwall	Mike Fontanelli & Henry Gilroy	October 12, 1997
30	"Run for Your Lifeguard!"	Daniël Shwall	Jeffrey Scott	October 12, 1997
30	"A Shoe Thing!"	Daniël Shwall	Bill Matheny	October 12, 1997
Tex Avery – Water You Gonna Do?: In search of water after losing his way, Tex finds himself a target for a hungry vulture. Maurice & Mooch – Run for Your Lifeguard!: Mooch passes himself off as a beach lifeguard in another attempt to eat Maurice. Power Pooch – A Shoe Thing!: After Little Buddy accidentally powers himself up with Power Pooch's Power Shoe, he must help his hero to stop a meteor heading for Earth (which P.P. had set on a collision course).
31	"Tallywho?"	Christian Choquet	Tracy Berna	October 15, 1997
31	"The Eggstra Terrestrial"	Christian Choquet	Eleanor Burian-Mohr & Steve Pesce	October 15, 1997
31	"Double O Scussi"	Christian Choquet	Mike Fontanelli & Henry Gilroy	October 15, 1997
Freddy the Fly – Tallywho?: On a recreational fox-hunt involving her servants, Amanda finds another target in Freddy when he disrupts the hunt. Maurice & Mooch – The Eggstra Terrestrial: Mooch disguises himself as an alien to try to eat Maurice. Pompeii Pete – Double O Scussi: Pete is mistaken for a spy by Dr. Danfeld, whose cat ends up bearing the brunt of his owner's attempts on Pete's life.
32	"Stagecoach Tex"	Daniël Shwall	Drew Daywalt, Henry Gilroy & David Henry Schneider	October 16, 1997
32	"Bored of the Flies"	Daniël Shwall	Michael Patrick Dobkins	October 16, 1997
32	"Slaphappy Birthday"	Daniël Shwall	Jeffrey Scott	October 16, 1997
Tex Avery – Stagecoach Tex: Tex and Sid fight over which of them has Chastity ride in their stagecoaches. Freddy the Fly – Bored of the Flies: Freddy and Amanda end up cast away on an island where Freddy is viewed by the natives as their king. Maurice & Mooch – Slaphappy Birthday: Mooch poses as a birthday clown so he can eat Maurice and his friends at his birthday party.
33	"To Ape or Not to Ape"	Christian Choquet	Drew Daywalt, Henry Gilroy & David Henry Schneider	October 17, 1997
33	"Tarred and Married"	Christian Choquet	Eddie Fitzgerald & Henry Gilroy	October 17, 1997
33	"Peek-A-Boom"	Christian Choquet	Michael Patrick Dobkins	October 17, 1997
Tex Avery – To Ape or Not to Ape: Lost in a jungle, Tex finds himself the unwilling apple of a female gorilla's eye and also the target of a jealous male gorilla. Einstone – Tarred And Married: An attempt to get rid of a T-Rex by disguising himself as a female T-Rex results in Einstone becoming his antagonist's unwilling mate. Genghis & Khannie – Peek-A-Boom: Genghis' attempts to attain a cannon to conquer a fort force him to agree to play with Khannie.
34	"What Big Feet You Have"	David Degrande	David Bleiman Ichioka & Ken Pontac	October 18, 1997
34	"Peer Pressure"	David Degrande	David Bleiman Ichioka & Ken Pontac	October 18, 1997
34	"Doggie Pounded"	David Degrande	Eleanor Burian-Mohr & Steve Pesce	October 18, 1997
Tex Avery – What Big Feet You Have: When Chastity offers a reward for evidence of Bigfoot's existence, Tex and Sid race to see who can get there first (though Tex mistakes Sid for Bigfoot after the latter disguises himself to create false evidence). Einstone – Peer Pressure: Having failed one time too many with his smarts, Einstone tries to earn the Neanderthals' respect by sinking himself to their level Power Pooch – Doggie Pounded: Needing some rest from crime fighting, Power Pooch takes a vacation, but is oblivious to the fact he is in a dog pound, and worse still is insistent that he doesn't need the Power Shoe.
35	"Just Plane Trouble"	Daniël Shwall	Ryder Windham	October 19, 1997
35	"Can't Fly Me Love"	Daniël Shwall	Chris Otsuki	October 19, 1997
35	"PP Loves Fifi"	Daniël Shwall	Michael Patrick Dobkins	October 19, 1997
Pompeii Pete – Just Plane Trouble: Dan finds his flight on a plane disrupted by Pete. Freddy the Fly – Can't Fly Me Love: Amanda receives a mail-order date who is much less interested in her than he is in getting at her money, while Freddy decides to play cupid his own way. Power Pooch – PP Loves Fifi: Against the oath of not using his powers for personal gain, Power Pooch tries to win a foxy female dog's heart with his might.
36	"My Dinner with Mooch"	David Degrande	Eleanor Burian-Mohr	October 22, 1997
36	"Diamonds Are for Heifer"	David Degrande	Steve Pesce & Bruce Talkington	October 22, 1997
36	"Squirrel Trouble"	David Degrande	Henry Gilroy	October 22, 1997
Maurice & Mooch – My Dinner with Mooch: Mooch is invited to Maurice's house for dinner, but he would much rather have chicken than pork. Freddy the Fly – Diamonds Are for Heifer: After Amanda buys the Hopeless Diamond despite initial suspicions of a curse relating to it, Freddy ensures that said curse comes true with his mischief. Power Pooch – Squirrel Trouble: Power Pooch tries to get rid of a particularly troublesome squirrel that was tearing up his owner's yard.
37	"Sagebrush Sindy"	Christian Choquet	Don Gillies	October 23, 1997
37	"Courting Disaster"	Christian Choquet	Jymn Magon	October 23, 1997
37	"The Postman Always Barks Twice"	Christian Choquet	Tracy Berna	October 23, 1997
Tex Avery – Sagebrush Sindy: In Canada, Sid tries to get one over on Tex (who was working as a Mountie) by disguising himself as a woman. Genghis & Khannie – Courting Disaster: After Genghis finally catches Khannie, to his dismay he ends up having to play with her when she wins the Emperor's favor. Power Pooch – The Postman Always Barks Twice: When the city's mailmen suddenly disappear as a part of Dr. Hydrant's latest scheme, Power Pooch decides to deliver the mail in their stead.
38	"Chastity Peak"	Daniël Shwall	Drew Daywalt & David Henry Schneider	October 24, 1997
38	"Ready Willing and Cable"	Daniël Shwall	Bruce Talkington	October 24, 1997
38	"Crass Action Hero"	Daniël Shwall	Michael Patrick Dobkins	October 24, 1997
Tex Avery – Chastity Peak: Tex and Sid race to reach the top of a mountain that they each intend to name after Chastity. Maurice & Mooch – Ready Willing and Cable: When Maurice and his family get a new TV, Mooch disguises himself as a cable guy so he can get Maurice as a TV dinner. Pompeii Pete – Crass Action Hero: On a studio tour, Pete is roped in by actor Dan as a sidekick for his new movie.
39	"Aw, Mush!"	Christian Choquet	Jeff Silverman	October 25, 1997
39	"The Wrath of Khannie"	Christian Choquet	Henry Gilroy	October 25, 1997
39	"The Midas Touche"	Christian Choquet	Michel Trouillet, Paul F. Quinn & Daniël Shwall	October 25, 1997
Tex Avery – Aw, Mush!: Tex and Sid race against each other in a sled race across the Yukon. Genghis & Khannie – The Wrath of Khannie: Genghis' conquest of Mars is complicated by Khannie's overinterpretation of planting flags. Freddy the Fly – The Midas Touche: Freddy becomes subjected to a curse meant for Amanda that causes everything he touches to become worthless, which he takes advantage of when Amanda competes with a rival.
40	"That's Shoe Biz"	David Degrande	Michel Trouillet, Paul F. Quinn & Daniël Shwall	October 26, 1997
40	"Dial M for Moron"	David Degrande	Michel Trouillet, Paul F. Quinn & Daniël Shwall	October 26, 1997
40	"I'll Take Manure"	David Degrande	Michel Trouillet, Paul F. Quinn & Daniël Shwall	October 26, 1997
Power Pooch – That's Shoe Biz: Power Pooch's Power Shoe accidentally ends up in the hands of a baby who ends up getting powered up by it. Pompeii Pete – Dial M for Moron: At a writer's block regarding a murder weapon for his next novel, author Daniel Mann tries to come up with one to get rid of gardener Pete. Freddy the Fly – I'll Take Manure: Amanda competes on her favorite game show, but Freddy enters it himself to try to win the top prize.
41	"Showdown at the I'm OK You're OK Corral"	Daniël Shwall	Michel Trouillet, Paul F. Quinn & Daniël Shwall	October 29, 1997
41	"Carnivores Anonymous"	Daniël Shwall	Michel Trouillet, Paul F. Quinn & Daniël Shwall	October 29, 1997
41	"Presidential Pooch"	Daniël Shwall	Michel Trouillet, Paul F. Quinn & Daniël Shwall	October 29, 1997
Tex Avery – Showdown at the I'm OK You're OK Corral : Tex and Sid's fighting puts them in a psychiatric hospital where a therapist attempts to make them stop fighting, which is easier said than done. Maurice & Mooch – Carnivores Anonymous: Mooch realizes he has a problem with eating chickens, such as Maurice, and that his life has become unmanageable, so he attends a Carnivores Anonymous meeting to end his bad habit. Power Pooch – Presidential Pooch: Power Pooch believes that when the First Lady says that she will "take out the President" it does not mean dinner and a show.
42	"Running of the Bullys"	Daniël Shwall	Michel Trouillet, Paul F. Quinn & Daniël Shwall	October 30, 1997
42	"What, Me Hostage?"	Daniël Shwall	Michel Trouillet, Paul F. Quinn & Daniël Shwall	October 30, 1997
42	"Coach Mooch"	Daniël Shwall	Michel Trouillet, Paul F. Quinn & Daniël Shwall	October 30, 1997
Einstone – Running of the Bullys: Fed up with annoying Neanderthals, Einstone packs up and moves on to find others that are more tolerable. Pompeii Pete – What, Me Hostage?: Pete innocently answers a bank's help wanted ad and is "employed" as a hostage when Dan's bank robbery attempt goes awry. Maurice & Mooch – Coach Mooch: Mooch convinces the townspeople that a baseball team is needed to prevent the young chickens from becoming juvenile delinquents, but he plans to eat Maurice and the other chickens on the team.
43	"Mutiny on the Poultry"	Daniël Shwall	Michel Trouillet, Paul F. Quinn & Daniël Shwall	October 31, 1997
43	"The Running Dan"	Daniël Shwall	Michel Trouillet, Paul F. Quinn & Daniël Shwall	October 31, 1997
43	"Ugh-ementary, My Dear Watson"	Daniël Shwall	Michel Trouillet, Paul F. Quinn & Daniël Shwall	October 31, 1997
Maurice & Mooch – Mutiny on the Poultry: When Maurice starts playing pirates, Mooch disguises himself as a pirate captain to eat Maurice. Pompeii Pete – The Running Dan: Dan is an unethical director of an art museum, who plans to steal an exhibited diamond. The only problem is that Pete can't keep his eyes off the diamond, because he was tasked by Dan to guard it. Einstone – Ugh-elementary, My Dear Watson: Einstone(called Sherlock Einstone in this cartoon) must solve a mystery involving a missing turtle, but his assistant Watson is making things difficult.
44	"Don't Shoot, it's a Shoot"	Daniël Shwall	Mark Zaslove	November 1, 1997
44	"Dawn of the Dan"	Daniël Shwall	Michel Trouillet, Paul F. Quinn & Daniël Shwall	November 1, 1997
44	"Tragedy and Comedy"	Daniël Shwall	Michel Trouillet, Paul F. Quinn & Daniël Shwall	November 1, 1997
Power Pooch – Don't Shoot, it's a Shoot: Always trying to "second guess" the criminal mind, Power Pooch is so vigilant, that he "foils" a major bank heist in broad daylight, but the bank robbers trick him into helping him rob the bank under the guise that they're filming a movie. Pompeii Pete – Dawn of the Dan: Dan is having a party at his mansion. Pompeii Pete is the doorman who can't seem to get the hang of opening the door, especially when a horde of zombies is invading. Einstone – Tragedy and Comedy: Einstone invents theater to inspire the Neanderthals to strive towards civilization.
45	"Tex-Files"	Daniël Shwall	Drew Daywalt, David Henry Schneider & Henry Gilroy	November 2, 1997
45	"Income Outcome"	Daniël Shwall	Eleanor Burian-Mohr & Steve Pesce	November 2, 1997
45	"Asgard Me Not"	Daniël Shwall	Jymn Magon	November 2, 1997
Tex Avery – Tex-Files: Tex and Sid are abducted by Chasity, which the two fight for the affection of. Freddy the Fly – Income Outcome: Amanda disguises herself as a woman of poverty to evade the taxman. Genghis & Khannie – Asgard Me Not: Genghis attempts to conquer the mythical Asgard in the name of the Emperor, but has to deal with Thor and his protege Khannie.
46	"Moochini the Magnificent"	Daniël Shwall	Michel Trouillet, Paul F. Quinn & Daniël Shwall	November 5, 1997
46	"Pumped Up!"	Daniël Shwall	Michel Trouillet, Paul F. Quinn & Daniël Shwall	November 5, 1997
46	"Map-solutely Not"	Daniël Shwall	Michel Trouillet, Paul F. Quinn & Daniël Shwall	November 5, 1997
Maurice & Mooch – Moochini the Magnificent: Mooch poses as a magician in another attempt to eat Maurice. Power Pooch – Pumped Up!: When the Power Shoe is at the cleaners, Power Pooch has to use the shoe of Wonder Wench, guardian of all things fashionable, to transform into Miss Power Pooch, to save the Lieutenant. Genghis & Khannie – Map-solutely Not: In the chilling Himalayas, the Emperor sets Genghis out to conquer the Great Ruler of the mountains, but he has to rely on an unreliable map from Khannie.
47	"Tex Meets Execs"	Daniël Shwall	Jymn Magon	November 6, 1997
47	"Agent from Horde"	Daniël Shwall	Michael Patrick Dobkins	November 6, 1997
47	"My Hairy Lady"	Daniël Shwall	Michel Trouillet, Paul F. Quinn & Daniël Shwall	November 6, 1997
Tex Avery – Tex Meets Execs: Tex and Sid attempt to engage in a shoot-out, but a network executive keeps changing the scene. Genghis & Khannie – Agent from Horde: Genghis is an agent of H.O.R.D.E., who's out to get a growth serum that's being guarded by two old women, and has to deal with Khannie, who she believes Genghis is her imaginary friend. Einstone – My Hairy Lady: Einstone teaches a female Neanderthal how to act and behave properly, so she can become his mate.
48	"Frankeinstone"	Daniël Shwall	Steve Brasfield	November 7, 1997
48	"Atlantis Shrugged"	Daniël Shwall	Rowby Goren	November 7, 1997
48	"Mini the Mooch"	Daniël Shwall	Michael Patrick Dobkins	November 7, 1997
Einstone – Frankeinstone: Einstone puts himself on the face of a Neanderthal so he can receive some affection from the cavewomen. Genghis & Khannie – Atlantis Shrugged: After seemingly conquering everything on the planet, the Emperor sets Genghis out to conquer Atlantis City, and a treasure that belongs to Khannie. Maurice & Mooch – Mini the Mooch: Mooch becomes the test subject of Maurice's science experiment, which involves shrinking the fox to test his reflexes.
49	"Duhmesticated"	Daniël Shwall	Michel Trouillet, Paul F. Quinn & Daniël Shwall	November 8, 1997
49	"Buzzin' Couzin'"	Daniël Shwall	Michel Trouillet, Paul F. Quinn & Daniël Shwall	November 8, 1997
49	"20/20 Houndsight"	Daniël Shwall	Michel Trouillet, Paul F. Quinn & Daniël Shwall	November 8, 1997
Einstone – Duhmesticated: Einstone creates a bachelor lounge, and has to keep some Neanderthals from crashing his private party. Freddy the Fly – Buzzin' Couzin: Amanda invites her rural cousin Mabel-Lee to get rid of Freddy, but she ends up becoming even more of a problem. Power Pooch – 20/20 Houndsight: After seeing an abstract painting, Power Pooch believes that he's losing his vision, and tries to deal with his apparent sight loss as he causes havoc at his master's banquet, which he thinks assassins are going to hijack.
50	"The Texorcist"	Daniël Shwall	Michel Trouillet, Paul F. Quinn & Daniël Shwall	November 9, 1997
50	"Enraptured Einstone"	Daniël Shwall	Michel Trouillet, Paul F. Quinn & Daniël Shwall	November 9, 1997
50	"May the Stressed Man Win"	Daniël Shwall	Michel Trouillet, Paul F. Quinn & Daniël Shwall	November 9, 1997
Tex Avery – The Texorcist: After killing Tex once and for all, Sid ends up being haunted by his corpse and ghost. Einstone – Enraptured Einstone: In an attempt to find a partner, Einstone ends up luring a female dinosaur, who brings him back to her carnivorous parents. Genghis & Khannie – May the Stressed Man Win: The Emperor takes Genghis into his garden when conquering plans get the best of him, but much to Genghis' chagrin, the Emperor also invites Khannie over as well.
51	"Dan the Man Child"	Daniël Shwall	Henry Gilroy & Beverly Morrison	November 12, 1997
51	"Queen Khannie"	Daniël Shwall	David Bleiman Ichioka & Ken Pontac	November 12, 1997
51	"Backseat Bedlam"	Daniël Shwall	Michael Patrick Dobkins	November 12, 1997
Pompeii Pete – Dan the Man Child: Dan tries to rob a rich woman's house under the guise of her son, but Pete tries to care for him. Genghis & Khannie – Queen Khannie: Genghis conquers Tiny Island, where he meets their leader Queen Khannie, whom he brings back to the Emperor. Maurice & Mooch – Backseat Bedlam: Mooch poses as Maurice's cousin Sven in an attempt to eat him on a road trip to the Grand Canyon.
52	"Flea! Run Away!"	Daniël Shwall	Michel Trouillet, Paul F. Quinn & Daniël Shwall	November 13, 1997
52	"Family Food"	Daniël Shwall	Michel Trouillet, Paul F. Quinn & Daniël Shwall	November 13, 1997
52	"Remember the Rigmarole"	Daniël Shwall	Michel Trouillet, Paul F. Quinn & Daniël Shwall	November 13, 1997
Power Pooch – Flea! Run Away!: Dr. Hydrant creates a superpowered flea out of Power Pooch's DNA, which consumes his energy from the Power Shoe. Maurice & Mooch – Family Food: Quarrelin' Kin is hijacked by Mooch so he can eat Maurice and his family, who are competing against Mooch's dimwitted cousins, Vernon and Earl. Genghis & Khannie – Remember the Rigamorle: Genghis attempts to storm the Alamo in Texas, but has difficulty gaining a password from guard Khannie.
53	"Armed Adillo"	Daniël Shwall	-	November 14, 1997
53	"Beyond Stupidity"	Daniël Shwall	Michel Trouillet, Paul F. Quinn & Daniël Shwall	November 14, 1997
53	"Queasy Cuisine"	Daniël Shwall	Michel Trouillet, Paul F. Quinn & Daniël Shwall	November 14, 1997
Tex Avery – Armed Adillo: While out his garden, Tex must deal with an armadillo, who is ruining his crops. Einstone – Beyond Stupidity: Einstone ends up in the future, and must escape from a woman who is madly in love with him. Pompeii Pete – Queasy Cuisine: After getting fired from being a firefighter, Pete becomes a waiter for a fancy restaurant that Dan is reviewing. If the restaurant doesn't get a good review, Dan will eat his notebook.

No.	Title	Original release date
54	"Tex-tra Credit / Power Puppy / Eski-No-Mo"	November 15, 1997
Tex Avery – Tex-tra Credit: Tex and Sid disguise themselves as students to compete over who will be Chastity's teacher's pet. Power Pooch – Power Puppy: Power Pooch is subjected to an age-regressing whistle as part of Dr. Hydrant's plan to re-educate him. Genghis & Khannie – Eski-No-Mo: Genghis plans to conquer the Arctic, but is thwarted by Khannie, who serves as his tour guide.
55	"Mister Smart Guy / Chicken Fried Cousins / Rich Meets Poe"	November 16, 1997
Einstone – Mister Smart Guy: Einstone competes with a smaller Neanderthal, who has the ladies' attention. Maurice & Mooch – Chicken Fried Cousins: While trying to catch Maurice, Mooch tries to convince his cousins, Vernon and Earl, that he is not a chicken so they don't capture and eat him. Freddy the Fly – Rich Meets Poe: A famous gothic writer named Edgar Allan Poe visits Amanda's mansion to write a poem about her, and gets inspiration when Amanda attacks Freddy. The next part of the cartoon is told in a similar manner to The Raven.
56	"The Dog Who Would Be King / Butlervania / Gym Dandy"	November 19, 1997
Power Pooch – The Dog Who Would Be King: While howling at the moon, Power Pooch tells Little Buddy a story about his former family. Freddy the Fly – Butlervania: Freddy tells the viewers about where all the butlers come from: a kingdom called Butlervania. Amanda goes there to hunt some wild butlers and train them to be her servants. Pompeii Pete – Gym Dandy: Pete helps Dan prepare for a pose off at a gym.
57	"Moby Cow / Dan's Best Friend / Unsurely, You Jest"	November 20, 1997
Tex Avery – Moby Cow: Tex tells some children a story of how he caught a giant cow. Pompeii Pete – Dan's Best Friend: After being cursed by a gypsy, Dan is transformed into a werewolf. Because the curse can only be lifted if he bites someone else, he ends up getting dragged into vet's office run by Pompeii Pete, so he can bite him. Genghis & Khannie – Unsurely, You Jest: The Emperor forces Genghis to become the new jester after he fires his old one. Genghis uses Khannie as practice to help him entertain the Emperor and make him laugh.
58	"Narrated Tex / Emperor on Holiday / Superchump"	November 21, 1997
Tex Avery – Narrated Tex: After getting foiled by Tex again, Sid steals the narrator's job and tries to narrate the cartoon in his favor. Tex turns the tables against him. Genghis & Khannie – Emperor on Holiday: The Emperor puts Genghis in charge of invading a castle guarded by Khannie while he is on vacation. Maurice & Mooch – Superchump: Mooch disguises himself as a superhero and tricks Maurice into becoming his sidekick so he can eat him.
59	"Night of the Living Dumb / Poil of Wisdom / The Butlers Did It"	November 22, 1997
Power Pooch – Night of the Living Dumb: A meteor's strange powers revive three cats as zombies, and Power Pooch and Little Buddy must fight them off. Einstone – Poil of Wisdom: Einstone uses a machine with a special pearl to make a Neanderthal smarter. When the machine doesn't work properly, Einstone must find another pearl. Freddy the Fly – The Butlers Did It: Freddy tricks Amanda's butlers into turning against her and doing the opposite of what she says.
60	"Corporate Takeover / Toy Pre-History / Stressed Guest"	November 23, 1997
Genghis & Khannie – Corporate Takeover: Genghis succeeds in taking over a big city and creates his own mud pie business. After trying one of Khannie's mud pies, Genghis decides to take her down by becoming more ambitious, but Khannie is a lot better at selling. Genghis decides to get rid of her. Einstone – Toy Pre-History: Einstone becomes an unwilling pet for a dinosaur, and must find a way to escape. Maurice & Mooch – Stressed Guest: Mooch fakes an accident by destroying his house and moving into Maurice's so he can eat him and his family, but grows to regret it.
61	"Sold Out / Dan or Dana / Shoeless"	November 26, 1997
Freddy the Fly – Sold Out: Amanda attends an auction, but Freddy also comes as an uninvited guest. Pompeii Pete – Dan or Dana: To escape the police, Dan disguises himself as a woman, but must also deal with Pete, who is in love with "her". Power Pooch – Shoeless: When a sea monster attacks, Power Pooch needs to find the Power Shoe, but can't seem to find it.
62	"Justice of the Pieces / The Buddy Guard / The Meat Tree"	November 27, 1997
Tex Avery – Justice of the Pieces: Tex ends up in a crazy town full of people who look like Sid, and is put on trial for breaking one of the town's laws. Pompeii Pete – The Buddy Guard: Dan is tasked to guard Pete, but they both end up in a bad part of town. Einstone – The Meat Tree: Einstone reminisces about the time he told some dinosaurs about a tree that grows meat.
63	"Tex and Sid's Blooper Spectacular / Time Flies, Chickens Don't / Men in Lavender"	November 28, 1997
Tex Avery – Tex and Sid's Blooper Spectacular: Tex and Sid showcase their favorite bloopers. Maurice & Mooch – Time Flies, Chickens Don't: Mooch chases Maurice for so long that they become very old. The elderly rivals reminisce about how they became enemies in the first place. Pompeii Pete – Men in Lavender: Dan and Pete are tasked with border patrol to make sure aliens don't get through customs, but some of the aliens are vicious.
64	"The Original Origin Story / Harrier Pigeon / Bat-Dan"	November 29, 1997
Power Pooch – The Original Origin Story: While being tied up by an evil cat, Power Pooch explains to Little Buddy how he first got the Power Shoe. Genghis & Khannie – Harrier Pigeon: After being thwarted by Khannie, Genghis decides to send a message to the Emperor by carrier pigeon, but he ends up sending a terrible picture of himself. Pompeii Pete – Bat-Dan: Pete becomes Bat-Dan's new sidekick and helps him stop his archenemies as the Clay Pigeon.
65	"Yearnin' for a Learning / The Stepford Chickens / French Twist"	November 30, 1997
Tex Avery – Yearnin' for a Learning: A censor forces Tex and Sid to add educational content to their antics, but Tex and Sid turn the tables on her. Maurice & Mooch – The Stepford Chickens: While at a town meeting, Mooch must tell the truth about how often he tries to eat Maurice, under the threat of being eaten by a group of chickens. Genghis & Khannie – French Twist: Genghis takes a vacation to France, but after the French army surrenders, Genghis becomes king, but also has to hang out with Khannie, who is the queen.

== Development ==
In October 1995, DIC Entertainment announced they would be opening an animation office in France in partnership with Hampster Productions (which at the time, was 33% minority-owned by DIC's majority owner Capital Cities/ABC, which had not yet been acquired by The Walt Disney Company), and that their first project would be called Tex Avery Theater. DIC also acquired the rights to use Avery's name and likeness through his estate in order to produce the series, with Avery's daughter Nancy Arkley reported to have a direct involvement in the series. The package of 195 7-minute cartoons was made available starting in October 1996. In March 1997, the studio was opened up and was named Les Studios Tex, which DIC was a shareholder, with DIC launching the show as The Wacky World of Tex Avery in syndication in the fall of that year.

The invocation of Avery's name allowed DIC to hire talent that otherwise would have never agreed to such a project, including Eddie Fitzgerald and Michael Fontinelli, who left DreamWorks Animation and Walt Disney Animation Studios, respectively, to join the new series out of respect for Avery's work. Production of the series was centered in France in part because the producers believed Avery had a Jerry Lewis-level reputation in the country and to better position the studio in the French market by meeting domestic production requirements. As DIC did not have access to any of Avery's characters (his MGM and early Warner Bros. work was owned at the time by the Turner Broadcasting System), a suite of new, non-derivative characters were created specifically for the series, including a cowboy named after Avery himself and meant to represent Avery's "hormonal" brand of humor. Original plans for Tex Avery Theater had the animated Avery serving as a host of bridging segments, before he was given his own segments during development.

During the production of the series at Hong Ying Animation in Suzhou, China, Jean Lajeunesse, who was working as an animation supervisor, reportedly experienced a severe mental health crisis due to the immense workload. According to fellow animation supervisor Peter Huggan, Lajeunesse became frustrated with the studio's inability to replicate the traditional "squash and stretch" animation style associated with Avery. After repeatedly sending work back for revisions without satisfactory results, Lajeunesse attempted to animate the entire series himself, despite the production schedule requiring roughly four episodes per week at over 30,000 drawings per episode. Colleagues observed Lajeunesse working through the night and noticed a visible decline in his physical health. After he failed to appear at his desk one day, studio staff discovered that ceiling tiles in his office had been removed, and found an insane Lajeunesse living in the crawlspace on the cement rafters. Studio management subsequently contacted local authorities, who removed him from the ceiling and had him committed to a psychiatric facility. Most episodes were animated using digital ink and paint, although certain episodes (specifically 12, 15, 24, 29, 30 and 36) were animated on cels due to the high cost of digital animation at the time.

== Home media releases ==
=== France ===
In July 2003, TF1 Video through the TF! Video label released a 2-DVD boxset of the series, which contained 48 cartoons (24 cartoons each). Another boxset was released in January 2004, containing 64 cartoons (32 cartoons each).

In April 2011, AV Video released a boxset containing the first 24 episodes, with 72 cartoons all on the 3 DVDs.

=== United States ===
On October 7, 2003, Sterling Entertainment Group released three VHSs/DVDs of the series titled Power Pooch to the Rescue, Pompeii Pete in the 21st Century and Tex Rides Again, each containing nine cartoons from their respective segments. On the DVD versions, three bonus cartoons are featured with other characters from the show, like Freddy the Fly. The Tex Avery and Pompeii Pete DVDs were re-released in 2007 by NCircle Entertainment.

In February 2013, Mill Creek Entertainment released The Wacky World of Tex Avery- Volume 1 on DVD in Region 1 for the first time. The four-disc set features the first 40 episodes of the series and includes a bonus episode of Bump in the Night. Additionally, "Rodeo, Rodeo, Where for Art Thou Rodeo? / The Dis-Orderly / A Bird in the Brain is Worth Two in the Bush" appears as a bonus episode on Gadget Boy's Adventures in History: The Complete Series Region 1 DVD.

The show at one point was available on Hulu, and has since been removed from the service. It is currently available on Tubi and Fandango at Home.

== Later syndication ==
After the show's run on M6 in France, the show re-aired on Télétoon in March 2002, and on Canal+ Family and Gulli in 2008 and 2010, respectively.

In Italy, the show was shown to Mediaset in 1999. The Italian dub of the show is also broadcast to Telebimbi, a Canadian Category B-exempt Italian language specialty channel.

In the United States, The Program Exchange syndicated the series primarily on Fox and UPN stations from 1997 to 2004. In 2010, the program re-aired in the United States for the first time in a decade, where it was a part of the weekday morning Cookie Jar Toons programming block on the now-defunct digital subchannel This TV. The show was removed from the lineup on September 26, 2011. Most episodes of the show were also available on Hulu and Jaroo.com. These prints plaster the DIC logo with the 2008 Cookie Jar logo. As of 2022, episodes 1-52 are available on Tubi. In 2025, the show began airing on MeTV Toons, where episodes 53-65 aired for the first time on American television since the end of its syndicated run for nearly 15 years.

== Reception ==
A preview by Variety noted that the series was anticipated with a mixture of excitement and dread; author Michael Mallory gave a positive review: "most of the master's trademarks are well-represented in the new cartoons. The full-throttle pacing is there, as well as the exaggerated eyeball takes; the subtle throw-away gags (...) the split-second timing, and the sparing use of music and sound effects (...) to punctuate the action."

In his book Encyclopedia of American Animated Television Shows, David Perlmutter described the show as an "insult" to the titular cartoonist, panning its animation, humor and pacing; Perlmutter said that it lacked the masterful way Avery himself employed and often transcended the limits of his material.

== See also ==
- The Tex Avery Show
