= Henny Penny =

Folk tale also known as "Chicken Little"

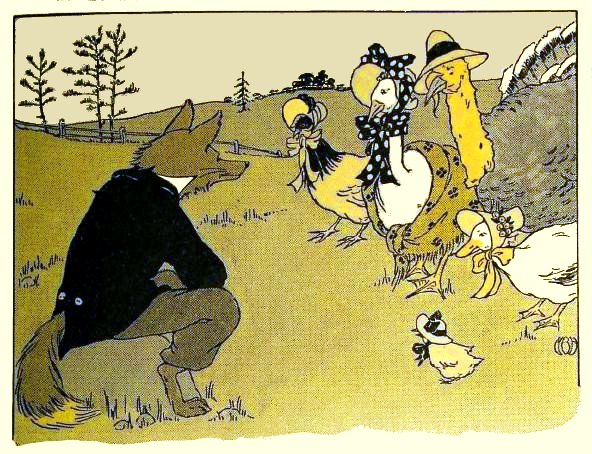
Illustration for the story "Chicken Little", 1916

"Henny Penny" (more commonly known in the United States as "Chicken Little" and sometimes as "Chicken Licken") is a European folk tale with a moral in the form of a cumulative tale about a chicken who believes that the world is coming to an end. The phrase "The sky is falling!" features prominently in the story, and has passed into the English language as a common idiom indicating a hysterical or mistaken belief that disaster is imminent. Similar stories go back more than 25 centuries and "Henny Penny" continues to be referred to in a variety of media.

== The story and its name ==
The story is listed as Aarne–Thompson–Uther Index type 20C, which includes international examples of folktales that make light of paranoia and mass hysteria. There are several Western versions of the story, of which the best-known concerns a chick which believes that the sky is falling when an acorn falls on its head. The chick decides to tell the king and, on its journey, meets other animals which join it in the quest. After this point, there are many endings. In the most familiar, a fox joins them, leads them to its lair, and then eats them all.

In most retellings, the animals have rhyming names, commonly Chicken Licken or Chicken Little, Henny Penny or Hen-Len, Cocky Locky, Ducky Lucky or Ducky Daddles, Drakey Lakey, Goosey Loosey or Goosey Poosey, Gander Lander, Turkey Lurkey, and Foxy Loxy or Foxy Woxy.

In the United States, the most common name for the story is "Chicken Little", as attested by illustrated books for children dating from the early 19th century. In Britain, it is best known as "Henny Penny" and "Chicken Licken".

== History ==
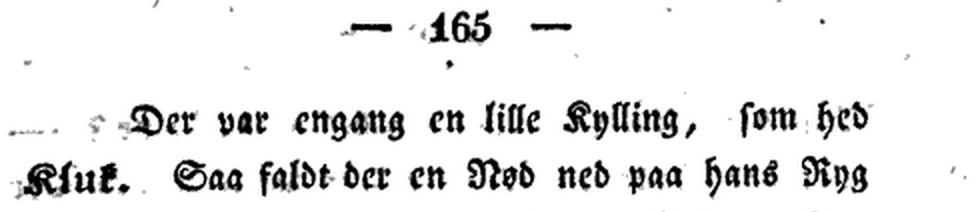
"There was once a little chick named Kluk": beginning of the 1823 Danish version of the story.

The story was part of the oral folk tradition and only began to appear in print after the Brothers Grimm had set a European example with their collection of German tales in the early years of the 19th century. One of the earliest to collect tales from Scandinavian sources was Just Mathias Thiele, who in 1823 published an early version of the Henny Penny story in the Danish language. The names of the characters in this version are Kylling Kluk, (Note: Kylling means "chick" (baby chicken); Kluk is an onomatopoeic representation of a chicken's vocalization, similar to English "cluck") Høne Pøne, (Note: Høne means "hen"; Pøne means "penny") Hane Pane, (Note: Hane means "cock"/"rooster") And Svand, (Note: And means "duck") Gaase Paase, (Note: Gaase (modern Danish Gåse) means "goose") and Ræv Skræv. (Note: Ræv means "fox") In Thiele's untitled account, a nut falls on Kylling Kluk's back and knocks him over. He then goes to each of the other characters, proclaiming that "I think all the world is falling" and setting them all running. The fox Ræv Skræv joins in the flight and, when they reach the wood, counts them over from behind and eats them one by one. Eventually, the tale was translated into English by Benjamin Thorpe after several other versions had appeared.

Once the story began to appear in the English language, the titles by which they went varied considerably and have continued to do so. John Greene Chandler (1815–1879), an illustrator and wood engraver from Petersham, Massachusetts, published an illustrated children's book titled The Remarkable Story of Chicken Little in 1840. In this American version of the story, the characters' names are Chicken Little, Hen-Pen, Duck-Luck, Goose-Loose, and Fox-Lox; Chicken Little is frightened by a leaf falling on her tail.

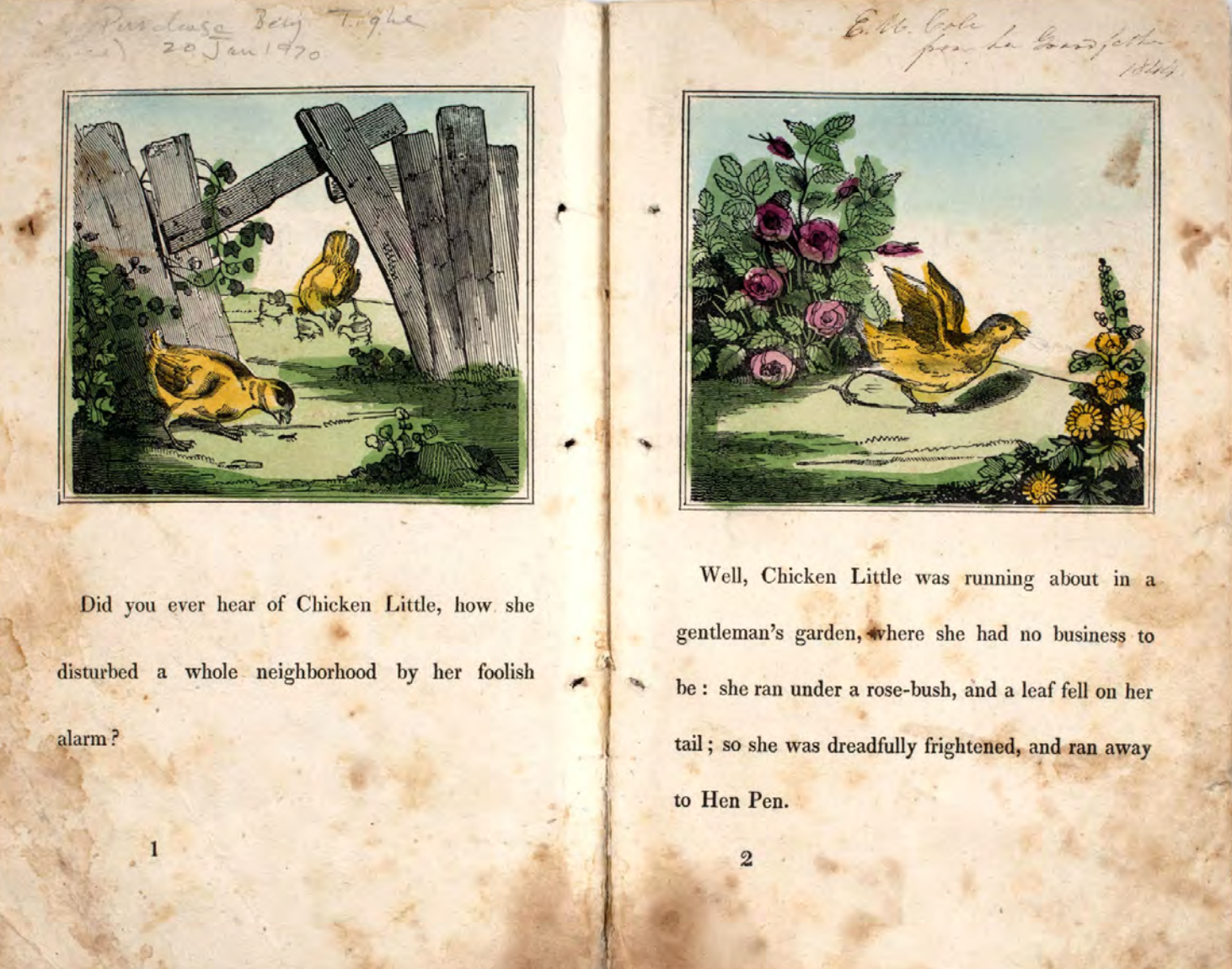
First pages of The Remarkable Story of Chicken Little (1840)

A Scots version of the tale is found in Robert Chambers's Popular Rhymes, Fireside Stories, and Amusements of Scotland of 1842. It appeared among the "Fireside Nursery Stories" and was titled "The hen and her fellow travellers". The characters included Henny Penny, Cocky Locky, Ducky Daddles, Goosie Poosie, and an unnamed tod (fox). Henny Penny became convinced that "the lifts were faun" (the heavens were falling) when a pea fell on her head.

In 1849, a "very different" English version was published under the title "The Story of Chicken-Licken" by James Orchard Halliwell. In this Chicken-licken was startled when "an acorn fell on her bald pate" and encounters the characters Hen-len, Cock-lock, Duck-luck, Drake-lake, Goose-loose, Gander-lander, Turkey-lurkey and Fox-lox.

It was followed in 1850 by "The wonderful story of Henny Penny" in Joseph Cundall's compilation, The Treasury of pleasure books for young children. Each story there is presented as if it were a separate book; this version also had two illustrations by Harrison Weir. In reality the story is a repetition of the Chambers narration in standard English, except that the dialect phrase "so she gaed, and she gaed, and she gaed" is retained and the cause of panic is mistranslated as "the clouds are falling".

Benjamin Thorpe's translation of Thiele's Danish story was published in 1853 and given the title "The Little Chicken Kluk and his companions". Thorpe describes the tale there as "a pendant to the Scottish story…printed in Chambers" (see above) and gives the characters approximately the same names as in Chambers.

Comparing the different versions, we find that in the Scots and English stories the animals want "to tell the king" that the skies are falling; while in the American story, as in the Danish, they are not given any specific motivation. In all versions they are eaten by the fox, although in different circumstances.

Comparison of early publications
Source	Title	Main character	Other characters	Initial event	Fear	Motivation	Fate
Thiele, 1823	[untitled]	Kylling Kluk	Høne Pøne; Hane Pane; And Svand; Gaase Paase; Ræv Skræv	A nut falls on Kylling Kluk's back	All the world is falling (al Verden falder)	So let us run (Saa lad os løbe)	Raev Skraev runs with them into the wood and eats them one by one
Chandler, 1840	The Remarkable Story of Chicken Little	Chicken Little	Hen Pen; Duck Luck; Goose Loose; Turkey Lurkey; Fox Lox	The leaf of a rose-bush falls on Chicken Little's tail	The sky is falling	None given, except that Chicken Little is frightened	Fox Lox invites the animals into his den, kills the others, and eats Chicken Little
Chambers, 1842	The Hen and Her Fellow-Travellers	henny-penny	cocky-locky ducky-daddles goose-poosie unnamed tod (fox)	A pea falls on henny-penny's head	"The lifts were faun" (the heavens were falling)	To tell the king about it	A tod (fox) takes them to his hole, forces them inside, then he and his young ones eat them
Halliwell, 1849	The Story of Chicken-licken	Chicken-licken	Hen-len; Cock-lock; Duck-luck; Drake-lake; Goose-loose; Gander-lander; Turkey-lurkey; Fox-lox	An acorn falls upon Chicken-licken's bald pate	The sky had fallen	To tell the king	Fox-lox takes them to his hole, then he and his young ones eat them
Thorpe, 1853 (translation of Thiele 1823)	The Little Chicken Kluk and His Companions	Chicken Kluk	Henny Penny; Cocky Locky; Ducky Lucky; Goosy Poosy; Foxy Coxy	A nut falls on Chicken Kluk's back	All the world is falling	Then let us run	Foxy Coxy runs with them into the wood and eats them one by one

== Definition ==
The name "Chicken Little" and the fable's central phrase The sky is falling! have been applied in contexts where people are accused of being unreasonably afraid, or to those trying to incite an unreasonable fear in those around them. The Merriam-Webster Dictionary shows 1895 as the first use of the name "Chicken Little" to refer to "one who warns of or predicts calamity, especially without justification". However, a much earlier oration delivered to the city of Boston on July 4, 1844 contains the passage:

To hear their harangues on the eve of the election, one would suppose that the fable of Chicken Little was about to become a truth, and that the sky was actually falling.

Behavioural scientists have recognised that such typical fearmongering can sometimes elicit a response called Chicken Little syndrome, described as "inferring catastrophic conclusions possibly resulting in paralysis". It has also been defined as "a sense of despair or passivity which blocks the audience from actions". The term began appearing in the 1950s and the phenomenon has been noted in many different societal contexts.

== Idiomatic usage ==
Collins Dictionary describes the term "Chicken Little" as used idiomatically in the US of "a person who constantly warns that a calamity is imminent; a vociferous pessimist". The Oxford English Dictionary also notes that usage of the cognate "Chicken Licken" for "A person who panics easily, or spreads alarm amongst others" is "originally and chiefly US" usage. In support it quotes Christian Connection's Herald of Gospel Liberty for 2 November 1922 as referring to another character in the tale too: "Those who encourage nostrums and quacks are Goosey Pooseys and Chicken Lickens."

Nevertheless, still other characters have appeared in the lyrics of songs in the UK. Round about 1900, Florence Hoare included "Henny Penny" as part of her suite of "Seven Children's Songs" written to fit music originally arranged by Johannes Brahms in 1858. And in their song "Moving in with" (from Bummed, 1986), the English band Happy Mondays included the refrain: "Henny Penny, Cocky Locky, Goosey Loosey/ Turkey Lurky, Tricky Licky, Ducky Lucky/ I'd say we're all on the move when the sound's falling in."

In the US there are many CDs, films, novels, and songs titled "The Sky is Falling", but the majority refer to the idiomatic use of the phrase rather than to the fable from which it derives. Among the several references to the tale that do so is the title "Chicken Little Was Right" (1968), by the Californian rock band The Turtles, referring to the false sense of security that alarmism challenges, although the original story is not otherwise referenced in the lyrics. A further example is the song "Chicken Little" (Fancy, 1997) by Idiot Flesh, especially in the refrain "The sky is falling, gotta tell the king" and the inclusion of the names of other characters from the story at the end.

== Adaptations ==
Walt Disney Animation Studios has made two versions of the story. The first was Chicken Little, a 1943 animated short released during World War II as one of a series produced at the request of the U.S. government for the purpose of discrediting Nazism. It tells a variant of the parable in which Foxy Loxy takes the advice of a book on psychology (on the original 1943 cut, it is Mein Kampf) by striking the least intelligent first. Dim-witted Chicken Little is convinced by him that the sky is falling and whips the farmyard into mass hysteria, which the unscrupulous fox manipulates for his own benefit. The dark comedy is used as an allegory for the idea that fear-mongering weakens the war effort and costs lives. It is also one of the versions of the story in which Chicken Little appears as a character distinct from Henny Penny.

The second Disney film was the very loosely adapted Chicken Little, released in 2005 as an animated feature. It is an updated science fiction sequel to the original fable in which Chicken Little is partly justified in his fears. In this version, Foxy Loxy is changed from a male to a female, and from the main antagonist to a local bully. Another film adaptation was the animated TV episode "Henny Penny" (1999), which was part of the HBO series Happily Ever After: Fairy Tales for Every Child. In this modern update, the story is given a satirical and political interpretation.

There have also been a number of musical settings. American composer Vincent Persichetti used the fable as the plot of his only opera, The Sibyl: A Parable of Chicken Little (Parable XX), op. 135 (1976), which premiered in 1985. Then in 2007 the singer and composer Gary Bachlund used the text of Margaret Free's reading version of "Chicken Little" (The Primer, 1910) with a similar teaching aim. Setting the text for high voice and piano, Bachlund noted in the score that he intends a reference to alarmism and its tragic consequences.

The folk tale's educative potential was also illustrated in the final episode of season 6 of the American TV sitcom, The Golden Girls (May 4, 1991), where Dorothy, Blanche, Rose and Sophia perform a musical version of Henny Penny ending in increasing literacy in the school where one of them teaches. Although the show's aim was comic entertainment, it was followed in 1998 by Joy Chaitin and Sarah Stevens-Estabrook's light-hearted musical version of the fable, "Henny Penny". Designed for between six and a hundred junior actors, it has additional characters as optional extras: Funky Monkey, Sheepy Weepy, Mama Llama, Pandy Handy and Giraffy Laughy (plus an aggressive oak tree).

In Singapore, a more involved musical was performed in 2005. This was Brian Seward's The Acorn - the true story of Chicken Licken. It is a tale of mixed motivations as certain creatures (including some among the 'good guys') take advantage of the panic caused by Chicken Licken.

Later in the UK the Guildhall School of Music and Drama pioneered a scheme to harness opera, in this case based on the tale of Henny Penny, as a tool for language education in primary schools. This was a participatory exercise whereby children took part in a production adapted in various European languages - French (Cocotte Chocotte), German (Hennig Pfennig), Spanish (Pollita Chiquita), Italian (Sabrina Gallina) - as well as using English.

== Related stories ==
A very early example containing the basic motif and many of the elements of the tale is some 25 centuries old and appears in the Buddhist scriptures as the Daddabha Jataka (J 322). In it, the Buddha, upon hearing about some particular religious practices, comments that there is no merit in them, but rather that they are "like the noise the hare heard." He then tells the story of a hare, already wondering, "If this earth should be destroyed, what would become of me?", who is frightened by a beli fruit falling on a palm leaf and jumps to the conclusion that the earth is coming to an end. The hare starts a stampede among the other animals until a lion halts them, investigates the cause of the panic and restores calm. The fable teaches how false beliefs can spread rapidly in a group and shows the potential benefit of thorough investigation.

The Australian author Ursula Dubosarsky tells the Tibetan version of the Jataka tale in rhyme, in her book The Terrible Plop (2009), which has since been dramatised, using the original title Plop!. In this version, the animal stampede is halted by a bear, rather than a lion, and the ending has been changed from the Tibetan original.

The Br'er Rabbit story, "Brother Rabbit Takes Some Exercise", is closer to the Eastern versions. In this story, Br'er Rabbit initiates the panic but does not take part in the mass flight, although Br'er Fox does. In this case, it is Br'er Terrapin that leads the animals back to question Br'er Rabbit.

== See also ==
- The Boy Who Cried Wolf – Aesop's fable
