= Stars over Hollywood =

American radio anthology series (1941–1954)

- Genre: Anthology
- Running time: 30 minutes
- Country of origin: United States
- Language: English
- Syndicates: CBS
- Starring: Numerous Hollywood stars
- Announcer: Jim Bannon; Frank Goss; Art Gilmore; Marvin Miller; Scott Douglas
- Directed by: Paul Pierce; Les Mitchel; Don Clark
- Produced by: Paul Pierce; Les Mitchel; Don Clark
- Original release: May 31, 1941 – September 25, 1954
- Opening theme: Chopin Etude No. 3
- Sponsored by: Dari-Rich Armour and Co.

Stars over Hollywood is a radio anthology in the United States. It was broadcast on CBS from May 31, 1941, to September 25, 1954, sponsored first by Dari-Rich, Carnation Milk and later by Armour and Company. (Note: This program should not be confused with Stars over Hollywood, a 15-minute dramatic serial, produced via electrical transcription by C. P. MacGregor Electrical Transcriptions.)

== Format ==
Comedies and light romances were typical episodes for Stars over Hollywood. The presentations were "casual and relaxed ... but the performances were very professional." Each of the program's scripts was original.

The show's success surprised many doubters, who thought that audiences would not listen to this type of broadcast on Saturday mornings, a time that has been described as "the ghetto of the schedule." The program lasted 13 years at the same time (12:30 pm, Eastern Time). Following the lead of Stars over Hollywood, other dramas, such as Armstrong Theater of Today and Grand Central Station, found success on Saturdays.

== Personnel ==
As the title implies, the program featured "major Hollywood stars." As an anthology, Stars over Hollywood had no recurring cast. A 1943 newspaper ad promised, "Each week you'll find a Hollywood star in the leading role of a new story."

Actors and actresses who appeared in leading roles during the program's run included Alan Ladd, Anita Louise, Mary Astor, Phil Harris, Merle Oberon, and Basil Rathbone. Supporting actors, most of whom were regulars on radio, included Lurene Tuttle, Janet Waldo, and Eve McVeagh. A 1953 newspaper article commented: "The phenomenal success of the program is due largely to the stars themselves, who like the show's family appeal. More than 50 top name personalities have come back for a second and sometimes third performance."

The program's host was Knox Manning. Announcers were Jim Bannon, Art Gilmore, Frank Goss, Marvin Miller, Art Ballinger, and Scott Douglas. Producer-directors were Les Mitchel, Paul Pierce, and Don Clark. Music directors were Del Castillo, Rex Koury, and Ivan Ditmars.

== Episodes ==
On February 21, 1953, "The Wonderful Miss Prinn" starred Debra Paget.
