= Chicken Little (1943 film) =

- Theatrical release poster
- Directed by: Clyde Geronimi
- Based on: "Henny Penny"
- Produced by: Walt Disney
- Starring: Frank Graham
- Narrated by: Frank Graham
- Music by: Oliver Wallace
- Animation by: Character animators: Ollie Johnston; Milt Kahl; Norman Tate; Ward Kimball; John Lounsbery; Effects animators: Edwin Aardal; George Rowley; Andy Engman
- Color process: Technicolor
- Production company: Walt Disney Productions
- Distributed by: RKO Radio Pictures
- Release date: December 17, 1943
- Running time: 9 minutes
- Country: United States
- Language: English

Chicken Little is a 1943 short film created by Walt Disney during World War II and directed by Clyde Geronimi. The short was based on the European folk tale "Henny Penny", known in the United States as "Chicken Little". It is an anti-Nazi film showing the evils of mass hysteria.

The folk tale was adapted by Disney again into a separate full-length film of the same name in 2005, with Zach Braff as the titular protagonist and directed by Mark Dindal.

== Plot ==
A narrator introduces the audience to the residents of a poultry farm: leader Cocky Locky, gossiper Henny Penny, intellectual Turkey Lurkey, drunkards Ducky Lucky and Goosey Poosie, and simpleton Chicken Little. Unbeknownst to the flock, a fox named Foxy Loxy intends to catch the chickens for dinner. The farm's fences and well-armed farmer prevent him from entering outright, so Foxy Loxy turns to a psychology manual. The manual states that the best way to manipulate a crowd is beginning with "the least intelligent", which he quickly identifies as Chicken Little.

Using cigar smoke, a bucket of water, a thunder sheet, and a blue-painted wooden board, Foxy Loxy tricks Chicken Little into believing that the sky is falling. Chicken Little panics and runs to tell the other farmyard residents, using the board as evidence. While the other chickens initially join in the panic, Cocky Locky quickly deduces that the "piece of the sky" is just a hunk of wood, dispersing the crowd and leaving Chicken Little humiliated.

Undeterred, Foxy Loxy returns to his book, where he finds a passage about undermining the masses' faith in its leadership. Adopting multiple disguises, he starts a series of rumors which raise doubts about Cocky Locky's intelligence and accuse him of being a totalitarian drunkard. Next, Foxy Loxy flatters Chicken Little, convincing him to challenge Cocky Locky's leadership.

Filled with confidence, Chicken Little announces that he will be the new leader and save the flock from the falling sky. Cocky Locky objects to his challenge, asking "If the sky is falling, why doesn't it hit me on the head?" At that moment, Foxy Loxy tosses another wooden board onto Cocky Locky's head, knocking him out. Seemingly vindicated, Chicken Little is made the flock's leader and is asked what to do next. Chicken Little, unknowingly goaded on by Foxy Loxy, suggests that the flock run away from the farm and into a nearby cave, which is actually Foxy Loxy's den.

Despite the narrator's assurance that everything will be alright, Foxy Loxy is soon revealed to have eaten all of the chickens, arranging their wishbones into rows resembling a war cemetery. The narrator protests that this was not how the story was supposed to end, to which Foxy Loxy responds, "Don't believe everything you read, brother!"

== Cast ==
- Frank Graham as Narrator / Foxy Loxy / Chicken Little / Cocky Locky / Turkey Lurkey / Additional characters
- Clarence Nash as Ducks (quacking sounds only)
- Florence Gill as Hens (clucking sounds only)

== Foxy Loxy and Mein Kampf ==
According to Disney historian David Gerstein in a comment on Andreas Deja's blog, the studio had the title of the book that Foxy Loxy reads changed from Hitler's Mein Kampf to the generic Psychology in a postwar reissue.

== Other appearances ==
Cocky Locky makes a cameo appearance in Mickey's Christmas Carol dancing at Fezzywig's party. Chicken Little makes a cameo appearance in the Toontown countryside in Who Framed Roger Rabbit.

== Television ==
The postwar reissue of the short is featured in the Walt Disney's Wonderful World of Color episode Man is His Own Worst Enemy, first airing on October 21, 1962. It is presented uncut, but instead of the original generic narrator, new unaltered narration is provided by Ludwig Von Drake.

== Home media ==
The short was released on May 18, 2004, on Walt Disney Treasures: Walt Disney on the Front Lines and on December 6, 2005, on Walt Disney Treasures: Disney Rarities - Celebrated Shorts: 1920s–1960s.

== See also ==
- Chicken Little (2005 film) – an animated film that is Disney's second adaptation of the fable. This film is unrelated to the 1943 cartoon.
- The Fox and the Crow – Columbia cartoon series starring Frank Graham as both the titular fox and crow
