= The Crooked Web =

1955 film by Nathan H. Juran

- Theatrical release poster
- Directed by: Nathan Juran (as Nathan Hertz Juran)
- Written by: Lou Breslow
- Produced by: Sam Katzman
- Starring: Frank Lovejoy; Mari Blanchard; Richard Denning
- Cinematography: Henry Freulich
- Edited by: Edwin H. Bryant
- Production company: Clover Productions
- Distributed by: Columbia Pictures
- Release date: November 30, 1955
- Running time: 77 minutes
- Country: United States
- Language: English

The Crooked Web is a 1955 crime film noir directed by Nathan Juran and starring Frank Lovejoy, Mari Blanchard and Richard Denning.

== Plot ==
Stan Fabian runs a drive-in restaurant with girlfriend Joanie Daniel, whose brother Frank turns up for a visit. Joanie has declined to marry Stan because he's strapped for cash, but Frank tempts him with a proposition, mentioning that he and a partner hid a stash of gold in Germany during the war.

Stan accepts an offer to help recover the gold for a cut of the loot. What he doesn't know is that Joanie and Frank are actually undercover cops. A rich businessman's son was apparently killed by Stan during a deal gone wrong, but the German police are unable to extradite him to charge him with a crime.

Frank pretends to shoot his partner, using blanks. He secretly meets with Berlin chief of police Koenig, pretending to be looking for the gold. Stan fears a double-cross, but confesses his wartime murder to Joanie, and is shocked to be placed under arrest.

== Cast ==
- Frank Lovejoy as Stanley Fabian
- Mari Blanchard as Joanie Daniel
- Richard Denning as Frank Daniel
- John Mylong as Herr Koenig
- Harry Lauter as Sgt. Mike Jancoweizc
- Steven Ritch as Ramon 'Ray' Torres
- Lou Merrill as Herr Schmitt
- Van Des Autels as Tom Jackson
