= Dix Davis =

American actor and intelligence analyst (1926–2024)

- Born: Dixon Davis; September 12, 1926; Los Angeles, California, U.S.
- Died: January 6, 2024 (aged 97); Dorset, Vermont, U.S.
- Other name: Peter Dixon Davis
- Education: University of Southern California, University of California, Berkeley
- Occupations: Actor, intelligence analyst
- Years active: 1934–1949, mid-1950s through the late 1980s
- Known for: A Date With Judy, One Man's Family
- Spouse: June Dunn
- Relatives: Tim Davis (brother)

Peter Dixon Davis (born Dixon Davis; September 12, 1926 – January 6, 2024) was an American child actor in radio and film, perhaps best known as Randolph, the title character's wise-cracking kid brother on the popular 1940s teen sitcom A Date With Judy. Davis later served as an intelligence analyst with the United States Information Service and, for more than three decades, with the Central Intelligence Agency's Office of Current Intelligence (OCI).

== Early life and career ==
Dixon Davis was born in Los Angeles, California on September 12, 1926. He was the younger of two sons born to Fredrick Duane Davis and Marion Naomi Stimson. According to an article published in 1942 by the Harrisburg Telegraph, Davis's "overnight" transition "from newsboy's assistant to actor" occurred in the summer of 1934 in front of The Brown Derby on Wilshire Boulevard, where, while hawking newspapers and magazines, Davis and his brother caught the fancy of a party of passersby headed by songwriter Gus Kahn. After purchasing some of their wares, Kahn and company instructed the boys to report to United Artists the next day for parts in Eddie Cantor's upcoming film, and thus Davis came to make his uncredited screen debut in the 1934 musical comedy Kid Millions.

The brief film career that resulted likewise consisted primarily of inconsequential bit parts, mostly uncredited. That said, on the rare occasion that he was given anything to play, Davis's work did not go unnoticed. Case in point, the 1940 drama, The Old Swimmin' Hole. Concluding its review of the film, The Hollywood Reporter notes, "Si Jenks is fine in support and there is still another good bit by another child, Dix Davis," while the British periodical Monthly Film Bulletin observes:

Jackie Moran is not so convincing as the adolescent Chris, but Charles Brown plays the big-hearted country doctor to perfection, and a special word must be said for Dix Davis, a small boy in the hero worshipping stage who wants to join the Lions.

In May 1939, Davis made his radio debut opposite Lionel Barrymore on The Rudy Vallee Show. The trio would be reunited at least twice in the next few years, for the 1941 and '42 editions of Barrymore's annual Christmas day rendition of Dickens' A Christmas Carol, with Davis as Tiny Tim and Vallee, Bob Cratchit, to Barrymore's Scrooge.

In April 1944, Davis co-starred with New York Yankees centerfielder Joe DiMaggio as the latter made his acting debut on the radio anthology series, Skippy Hollywood Theatre. Later that year, Davis was teamed with Basil Rathbone on Columbia Masterworks' recording of Robert Louis Stevenson's Treasure Island, as Jim Hawkins to Rathbone's Long John Silver.

Approximate date(s)	Program (or LP)	Role	Notes
May 1939	The Rudy Vallee Show		Radio debut opposite Lionel Barrymore
1939 or 1940	Hedda Hopper's Hollywood	Jack Benny	Series aired Mondays, Wednesdays, and Fridays, featuring Hoppers' "Biodramas" of Hollywood celebrities, each consisting of either three or six parts. Benny's was one of the 6-parters, and in the first episode or two, Davis played the young Benny.
1940 through 1949	One Man's Family	Pinky	
1941 through 1948	A Date With Judy	Randolph Foster	
1941	Jack Benny Show	Belly Laugh Barton	
April 29, 1941 through August 16, 1941	Latitude Zero		Written by Anne and Ted Sherdeman.
March 3, 1941	Lux Radio Theatre ep. "My Bill"	Bill Colbrook	With Kay Francis and Warren William.
December 25, 1941, December 25, 1942	A Christmas Carol	Tiny Tim	Co-starred with Lionel Barrymore, who plays Scrooge.
January 19, 1942	The Orson Welles Show ep. "My Little Boy"		
1942	Hap Hazard	Stanley, the bellhop	
1942	Blondie	Alvin Fuddle	
1942	Burns and Allen	Neighbor's child	
September 2 and 9, 1942	Those We Love	Edgar ("the mean little boy")	Guest star on two episodes.
November 2, 1942 through July 30, 1943	Today at the Duncans	Dinky Duncan	
Summer 1943	The Fred Brady Show	Orson (Fred's kid brother)	Summer replacement show for The Bob Burns Show.
November 1943	Columbia Masterworks' A Christmas Carol	Peter Cratchit	With Basil Rathbone as Scrooge, Francis X. Bushman as Christmas Past, Jay Novello as Bob Cratchit, and Tommy Cook as Tiny Tim.
April 22, 1944	Skippy Hollywood Theatre ep. "One Hit—Two Errors"	Lefty Collins	Co-starred with Joe DiMaggio, making his acting debut as "Joe Collins."
November 1944	Columbia Masterworks'; Treasure Island	Jim Hawkins	Paired with Basil Rathbone's Long John Silver; Rathbone also narrates.
1944 through 1946	The Charlotte Greenwood Show	Robert Barton	
1946	The Second Mrs. Burton	Brad Burton	
April through July 1948	I Love Adventure		
August 1948	Dr. Christian	Scrapper Malloy	
c. 1950	Mail Call; Program no. 367		A soap opera satire and a quiz show satire calle, Take it or I'll Give You a Shot in the Head. Also feat. Del Sharbutt, Lina Romay, Toni Harper, Dick Powell, Martha Stewart, Herb Jeffries, André Previn, Michel Perrier, Armed Forces Radio Service Orchestra.
June 8, 1953 through February 5, 1954	Family Skeleton		

== Later career ==
As early as 1943, Davis made it known that his long-range goals did not include acting, nor anything else remotely show-business-related.

Dix is dark-haired, brown-eyed, has regular features which are thickly speckled with freckles, and is "14 going on 15." (Note: In fact, Davis—born September 9, 1926—was sixteen going on seventeen when this was published, heightening even further the "rather small for his age" incongruity noted elsewhere in the same article.) Most of the time he seems a bit too preoccupied to pay much attention to girls; possibly because his thoughts are concerned with the far-away places of the globe. His ambition, it appears, is to be a trained geographer-explorer, and his hobby is map making.

In 1946 and '47, an approximately one-year-long hitch with the United States Army saw Davis reach the rank of Sergeant, but also delayed by one year his graduation from the University of Southern California. In 1948, the then-21-year-old USC senior initially hinted at, then definitively announced his intention to pursue a diplomatic career. In November of that year, however, a recent addition to A Date With Judy's cast helped Davis—albeit only temporarily—make a somewhat less radical career detour:

Dix Davis, who plays Randolph, Judy's brother, And Dick Crenna, Oogie Pringle, the teen-ager's boy friend, have now entered a new profession—song writing. They've just written a tune, "Tomorrow," which they hope to publish soon. Davis did the lyrics, Crenna the music.

Following a six-month, 15,000-mile road trip through Europe in 1949, Davis was employed by the State Department, serving as Assistant Press Officer in Pakistan. He later earned an advanced degree in Political Science from the University of California, Berkeley, prior to commencing his 33-year career with the CIA's Office of Current Intelligence, delivering periodic briefings to every U.S. President from Eisenhower through Reagan.

== Personal life and death ==
Davis met his future wife June Dunn in Washington, D.C., during his second career with the CIA's Office of Current Intelligence. He died on January 6, 2024, at the age of 97. He was predeceased by his wife and his brother, and survived by his late wife's two sons, their spouses, and several grandchildren.

== Partial filmography ==
- Kid Millions (1934) - Little Boy in Ice Cream Number (uncredited)
- Our Gang Follies of 1936 (1935) - Audience member lifted in air when fat boy sits down
- The Pigskin Palooka (1937) - #33 on Opposing Team
- Our Gang Follies of 1938 (1937) - Boy sitting at the table closest to the gang's, right next to Spanky, in Clubhouse Spanky scene (uncredited)
- The Adventures of Tom Sawyer (1938) - Schoolboy (uncredited)
- Test Pilot (1938) - Kid (uncredited)
- Cocoanut Grove (1938) - Boy Who Fights Half-Pint (uncredited)
- The Singing Cowgirl (1938) - Billy Harkins
- The Little Ranger (1938) - Gang Member Who Ties Alfalfa (uncredited)
- Breaking the Ice (1938) - uncredited
- Aladdin's Lantern (1938) - Boy Sitting Behind Deacon (uncredited)
- Feathered Pests (1939) - Kid
- The Doctor Takes a Wife (1940) - Boy (uncredited)
- Our Town (1940) - Si Crowell
- I Love You Again (1940) - Cpl. Belenson (uncredited)
- The Old Swimmin' Hole (1940) - Jimmy
- Meet the Chump (1940) - Newsboy (uncredited)
- Bad Men of Missouri (1941) - Young Bob (uncredited)
- The 500 Hats of Bartholomew Cubbins (1943) - Messenger (voice)
