= The Crime Smasher =

1943 film by James Tinling

- Directed by: James Tinling
- Written by: Walter Gering; Michael L. Simmons
- Based on: Cosmo Jones by Frank Graham
- Produced by: Lindsley Parsons
- Starring: Edgar Kennedy, Richard Cromwell and Gale Storm
- Cinematography: Mack Stengler
- Edited by: Carl Pierson
- Music by: Edward J. Kay
- Production company: Monogram Pictures
- Distributed by: Monogram Pictures
- Release date: January 29, 1943
- Running time: 62 minutes
- Country: United States
- Language: English

The Crime Smasher is a 1943 American crime comedy film directed by James Tinling and starring Edgar Kennedy, Richard Cromwell and Gale Storm. It is based on the Radio program Cosmo Jones featuring Frank Graham. The film's sets were designed by the art director Dave Milton. It is sometimes alternatively titled Cosmo Jones in the Crime Smasher.

== Plot ==
When the dead body of a gangster is tossed out of a moving car in front of Police Headquarters, Police Chief Murphy is annoyed to see meek, mild Cosmo Jones taking photographs at the scene. An arrest and grilling only reveals that Cosmo is an amateur criminologist who has taken an interest in the case.

Cosmo gets in deeper when he witnesses a failed kidnap attempt of heiress Susan Fleming. Bystander/witness Eustace Smith, who pronounces himself allergic to bullets and knives, attaches himself to Cosmo for protection. Cosmo is delighted to have an assistant as it makes him feel more professional.

A second kidnap attempt on Fleming is successful as she is taken from her bed in her own home. To Chief Murphy's dismay, Fleming's family trusts Cosmo enough to let him handle the ransom drop. After some confusion with lookalike briefcases, Cosmo ends up at the place where Susan is being held captive; sold out by her boyfriend for a cut of the ransom money.

Police rescue Susan in a shoot out with Eustace conquering his fears long enough to kayo several hoodlums with a mallet.

When it is all over, Cosmo announces he'd like to join the police force. This touches off a typical temper explosion from Chief Murphy.

== Cast ==
- Edgar Kennedy as Police Chief Murphy
- Richard Cromwell as Sgt. Pat Flanagan
- Gale Storm as Susan Fleming
- Mantan Moreland as Eustace Smith
- Frank Graham as Professor Cosmo Jones
- Gwen Kenyon as Phyllis Blake
- Herbert Rawlinson as Mr. James J. Blake
- Tristram Coffin as Jake Pelotti
- Charles Jordan as Biff Garr
- Vince Barnett as Henchman "Gimp"
- Emmett Vogan as Police Commissioner Gould
- Maxine Leslie as Mrs. Jake Pelotti
- Mauritz Hugo as Tony Sandol - Gangster
- Sam Bernard as Gangster

== Bibliography ==
- Tucker, David C. Gale Storm: A Biography and Career Record. McFarland, 2018.
