= Frank Graham (voice actor) =

American actor and radio announcer (1914–1950)

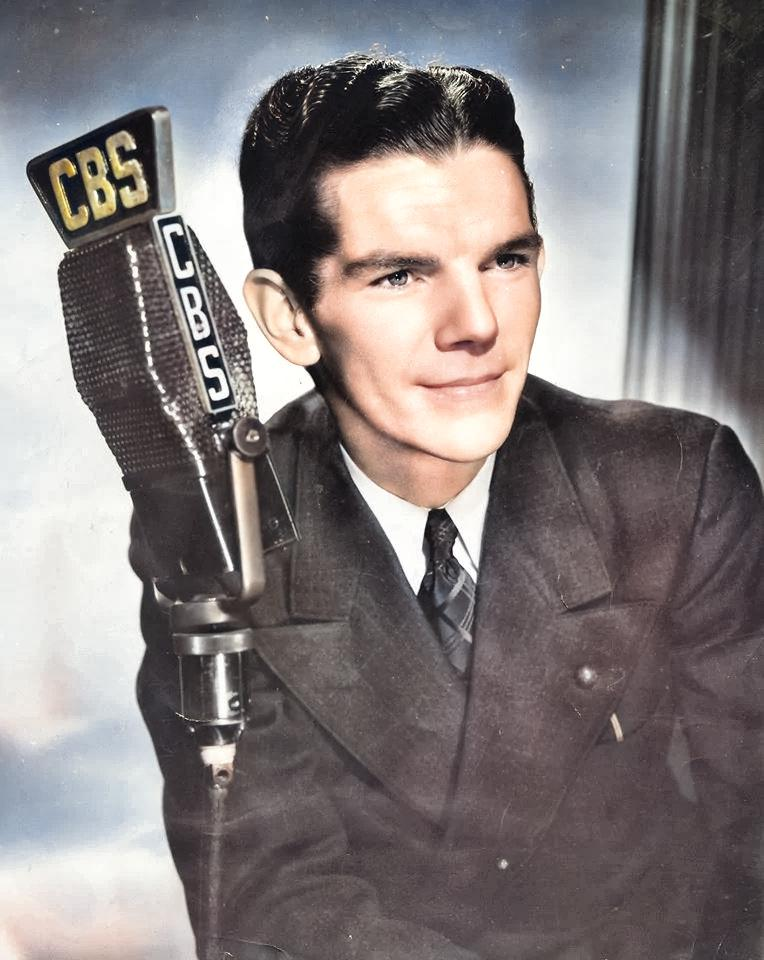
- Graham on CBS in the 1940s
- Born: Frank Lee Graham; November 22, 1914; Detroit, Michigan, U.S.
- Died: September 2, 1950 (aged 35); Hollywood, California, U.S.
- Occupations: Radio announcer, voice actor
- Years active: 1936–1950

So Much for So Little, an Oscar-winning short documentary film narrated by Frank Graham

Frank Lee Graham (November 22, 1914 – September 2, 1950) was an American radio announcer and voice actor, best remembered for his many voice roles during the Golden Age of American Animation. He started his career as a voice actor and writer for radio in the 1930s, being described as the "man of a thousand voices". His most famous of these was Prof. Cosmo Jones, whom he played in the live action film adaptation The Crime Smasher (1943). He provided voices for MGM, Warner Bros, Screen Gems, Disney, and WWII propaganda shorts, primarily as a narrator. His more notable roles include Slick McWolf in six Tex Avery shorts, including the acclaimed Red Hot Riding Hood (1943), the narrator of the Walt Disney Classics film The Three Caballeros (1944), and The Fox and the Crow in eighteen shorts from 1942-1946. He appeared in six Tom and Jerry shorts, including two as Butch and as the Lion in Jerry and the Lion (1950), which was his last role released before his death from suicide that same year.

== Biography ==
Graham was born on November 22, 1914, in Detroit, Michigan, to Frank L. Graham and opera singer Ethel Briggs Graham. He later traveled with his mother on tour.

He starred in Jeff Regan, Investigator and co-developed the radio drama Satan's Waitin' with Van Des Autels. Graham was also The Wandering Vaquero, the narrator of The Romance Of The Ranchos radio series (1941–1942), also on the CBS network.

One of his few live-action roles was portraying the title character in the film Cosmo Jones, Crime Smasher (1943). He had also served as a writer for the radio program upon which the film was based.

Graham voiced numerous characters in animated films for Walt Disney, MGM, Columbia and Warner Bros. He voiced Slick McWolf in Tex Avery's Droopy cartoons, as well as the Mouse in King-Size Canary at Metro-Goldwyn-Mayer. He provided the voices of the Fox and the Crow in the shorts of the same name at Columbia.

He was found dead at age 35 in his convertible in the carport of his home in Hollywood on September 2, 1950, with a photograph of Mildred Rossi by his side. Rossi had ended a relationship with him weeks earlier. A coroner declared he had committed suicide by carbon monoxide poisoning.

== Filmography ==
Year	Title	Role	Notes
1941	The Night Before Christmas	Narrator	Voice, uncredited
1942	A Hollywood Detour	Narrator	Voice, uncredited
1942	Horton Hatches the Egg	Narrator / Tall Hunter	Voice, uncredited
1942	Woodman, Spare That Tree	The Fox and the Crow	Voice, uncredited
1942	Foney Fables	Narrator / Wolf	Voice, uncredited
1942	Blitz Wolf	Narrator	Voice, uncredited
1942	Saludos Amigos	Himself	Uncredited
1942	The Early Bird Dood It!	Bird	Voice, uncredited
1942	Toll Bridge Troubles	The Fox and the Crow	Voice, uncredited
1942	Fox Pop	Prisoner Fox	Voice, uncredited
1943	Slay It with Flowers	The Fox and the Crow	Voice, uncredited
1943	Cosmo Jones, Crime Smasher	Professor Cosmo Jones	
1943	Dumb-Hounded	Wolf / Mayor	Voice, uncredited
1943	Plenty Below Zero	The Fox and the Crow	Voice, uncredited
1943	Red Hot Riding Hood	Wolf / Storyteller / Nightclub MC / Cab Driver	Voice, uncredited
1943	Tree for Two	The Fox and the Crow	Voice, uncredited
1943	Coming!! Snafu	Narrator	Voice, uncredited
1943	A-Hunting We Won't Go	The Fox and the Crow	Voice, uncredited
1943	Reason and Emotion	Narrator / Reason	Voice, uncredited
1943	Sleepy Lagoon	Narrator	Uncredited
1943	Room and Bored	The Fox and the Crow	Voice, uncredited
1943	Way Down Yonder in the Corn	The Fox and the Crow	Voice, uncredited
1943	Chicken Little	Narrator / Foxy Loxy / Chicken Little / Cocky Locky / Turkey Lurkey / Additional Voices	Voice, uncredited
1943	Rumors	Narrator – Soldier	Voice, uncredited
1944	Ladies Courageous	Col. Andy Brennan	Voice, uncredited
1944	The Weakly Reporter	Various	Voice, uncredited
1944	The Lady and the Monster	Narrator	Uncredited
1944	The Dream Kids	The Fox and the Crow	Voice, uncredited
1944	Going Home	Narrator	Voice, uncredited
1944	The Chow Hound	Narrator	Voice, uncredited
1944	Mr. Moocher	The Fox and the Crow	Voice, uncredited
1944	Big Heel-Watha	Narrator / Chief Rain-in-Face / Interpreter	Voice, uncredited
1944	The Stupid Cupid	Narrator and Elmer Fudd	Voice, uncredited
1944	Be Patient, Patient	The Fox and the Crow	Voice, uncredited
1944	The Egg-Yegg	The Fox and the Crow	Voice, uncredited
1944	The Three Caballeros	Narrator	Voice
1945	Tokyo Woes	Narrator	Voice, uncredited
1945	The Shooting of Dan McGoo	Wolf / Bartender / Narrator	Voice, uncredited
1945	Jerky Turkey	Indian	Voice, uncredited
1945	Something You Didn't Eat	Narrator	Voice, uncredited
1945	Ku-Ku Nuts	The Fox and the Crow	Voice, uncredited
1945	Swing Shift Cinderella	Wolf / Nightclub MC / Wolves	Voice, uncredited
1945	Fresh Airedale	Narrator – Shep's Master	Voice, uncredited
1945	Treasure Jest	The Fox and the Crow	Voice, uncredited
1945	Phoney Baloney	The Fox and the Crow	Voice, uncredited
1945	Wild and Woolfy	Race Caller	Voice, uncredited
1946	Baseball Bugs	Baseball Commentator / Gas-House Gorilla	Voice, uncredited
1946	Springtime for Thomas	Jerry's Devil Conscience / Butch	Voice, uncredited
1946	Foxy Flatfoots	The Fox and the Crow	Voice, uncredited
1946	Unsure Runts	The Fox and the Crow	Voice, uncredited
1946	The Hick Chick	Bull	Voice, uncredited
1946	The Eager Beaver	Narrator	Voice, uncredited
1946	Cagey Bird	Dog	Voice, uncredited
1946	Northwest Hounded Police	Wolf / Chief / Dr. Putty-Puss	Voice, uncredited
1946	Mysto-Fox	The Fox and the Crow	Voice, uncredited
1946	Honesty Is the Best Policy	Professor J. Waldo Purrington / Fish Vendor	Voice, uncredited
1947	Slap Happy Lion	Mouse	Voice, uncredited
1947	King-Size Canary	Mouse	Voice, uncredited
1948	Lo, the Poor Buffal	Indian (saying "Yipe!")	Voice, uncredited
1949	So Much for So Little	Narrator	Voice, uncredited
1949	The House of Tomorrow	Narrator / Machine	Voice, uncredited
1949	Each Dawn I Crow	Narrator	Voice, uncredited
1950	Jerry and the Lion	Lion / Radio Announcer	Voice, uncredited
1950	The Chump Champ	Announcer	Voice, uncredited, released posthumously
