= Personal Appearance Theater =

American TV anthology series (1951–1952)

Personal Appearance Theater is an American half-hour television anthology series that featured a combination of comedy and mystery films. A total of 29 episodes aired on ABC from October 27, 1951, to May 23, 1952.

Among its guest stars were Nina Bara, Anita Louise, Jane Darwell, Madelon Mitchel, Robert Anderson, and Clem Bevans, as well as Marjorie Reynolds, Buddy Ebsen, Joseph Schildkraut, and Dub Taylor.

The program's competition included The Whistling Wizard on CBS.

Personal Appearance Theater initially was on Saturdays from 7 to 7:30 p.m. Eastern Time. In December 1951, it was moved to Fridays from 9:30 to 10 p.m. E. T. In May 1951 it was moved 8:30 to 9 p.m. E. T. on Fridays.

Bob Finkle was the director.
