= Slap Happy Lion =

- The mouse gets one up on the lion.
- Directed by: Tex Avery
- Story by: Heck Allen
- Produced by: Fred Quimby
- Starring: Frank Graham; Sara Berner (all uncredited)
- Music by: Scott Bradley
- Animation by: Ray Abrams; Robert Bentley; Walter Clinton
- Layouts by: Walter Clinton (uncredited)
- Backgrounds by: John Didrik Johnsen (uncredited)
- Color process: Technicolor
- Production company: MGM cartoon studio
- Distributed by: Metro-Goldwyn-Mayer
- Release date: September 20, 1947
- Running time: 7 minutes
- Language: English

Slap Happy Lion is a 1947 American animated short film directed by Tex Avery and produced by Fred Quimby for Metro-Goldwyn-Mayer. Released on September 20, 1947, the short details the tragic downfall of a lion from king of the beasts to a gibbering, pill-popping wreck. It is narrated by a mouse whose torments drove him crazy. The mouse's voice was supplied by Frank Graham. Scott Bradley provided the music.

== Plot ==
Outside the Jingling Bros. Circus (a parody of the Ringling Bros. Circus), a hospital ward clerk hauls out a lion in a wheelchair who has had a nervous breakdown. Watching this, a mouse expresses his disappointment about the lion being mouse-shocked and then talks about what happened before.

We are then given a flashback about the lion being king of the beasts because all the animals are scared to death of him. He roars and gets everyone out of his sight. His loud roar frightens every last animal, including a gorilla, who screams, shrinks down in size, and runs off.

Then, one day, the lion meets a mouse who says "Boo," making the lion do a double take, feel scared, and scream twice at him. The lion hides up a tree, frightened, then comes down, stands up, and roars at the mouse. Unfortunately for him, the mouse proves to be tougher than expected. The mouse eventually walks away but mistakenly steps in the wrong direction—straight into the lion's mouth.

The lion succeeds in catching the mouse and tries to eat him, hoping to kill him. However, he is so distracted by trying to do so that he doesn't realize that he is missing a tooth, which has fallen out of his mouth. The mouse is hiding in the gum between the rest of his teeth. By the time the lion notices his missing tooth, it's too late. The mouse then gets out of the lion's mouth and rolls out his tongue like a window shade. The lion grabs the mouse with his tongue, pulls him back in, and tries to swallow him. While inside the lion's stomach, the mouse finds two bones and plays the lion’s ribs like a xylophone.

The lion tries to kill the mouse by lighting a bomb with a match, putting it in his mouth, and swallowing it. When the mouse sees the bomb inside the lion's stomach, he screams and escapes the lion's mouth again, fleeing from him. The lion feels smug until he realizes the bomb is still inside him. He screams for help, but the bomb explodes. Though he survives the explosion, he gets his tail bitten by the mouse, who grabs and bites the lion’s tail, angering him even more.

While the lion looks for the mouse, the mouse sneaks inside his head and pulls out firecrackers, which explode. The mouse cooks the lion's tail, causing him to roar in pain. When the lion runs to the lake to cool it down, the mouse pulls out a safety pin and a sign that says “CENSORED” before finally poking him in the rear.

The lion then tries to hide from the mouse but finds him in the following places:

- On top of a palm tree
- Under a rock, hoping to dodge the mouse, only to find him inside
- In an abandoned hut
- Inside a gun that the lion fires to shoot the mouse
- In a bed where the mouse lives
- In a reflection in the mirror
- In a bottle of whiskey that the lion tries to drink

The mouse finally peeves the lion in different ways by hurting his feet, blowing a toot in his ears, biting his nose, and kicking him out, and when he is now a nervous wreck, the lion runs out of the hut and around the jungle.

After the story, the mouse wonders how anyone could be afraid of a mouse when another mouse shows up and says "Boo." and despite being a mouse himself, he says, 'A mouse.' and screams and runs off like the lion did.

== Voice Cast ==
- Frank Graham as The Mouse
- Sara Berner as Small Crocodile
- Tex Avery as Lion and Animal Vocal Effects
  - Sara Berner also provides the Scream for both the Lion and the Mouse.

== Notes ==
The closing title in the re-issued version does not display the regular MGM card, and erroneously uses the Tom and Jerry card instead. This might indicate that MGM made a mistake when reissuing it. Also, the Tom and Jerry short Smarty Cat also does not display the ending card, using the regular MGM card instead.

The lion's design served as the inspiration for the design of Genghis, a character from The Wacky World of Tex Avery. The lion would also reappear in the Tom and Jerry Tales episode, You're Lion.
