= The Paradons =

US musical group

- Origin: Kern County, Bakersfield, California, United States
- Genres: R&B, doo-wop, soul, rock-n-roll Country
- Years active: 1959–1960
- Label: Milestone Records
- Past members: Charles Arbuckle; West Tyler; Billy Meyers; Chuck Weldon; William Powers
- Website: myspace.com/theparadons

The Paradons are an American doo wop vocal group from Bakersfield, California, United States, that formed in 1959.

The group began by singing locally at school dances and clubs. Within a few months they secured a recording session with Werly Fairburn's Milestone Records—not to be confused with the like-named jazz label founded by Orrin Keepnews about six years later—and recorded eight songs. Their first release with the label, "Diamonds and Pearls" / "I Want Love", became a hit in the US, peaking at number 27 on the US Billboard R&B chart and number 18 on the Billboard Hot 100 in 1960.

The group appeared on American Bandstand and at the Apollo Theater in the wake of its success.

The group soon broke up over monetary disputes, having been together less than a year.

Despite the group's demise, Milestone continued releasing singles from their initial recording sessions, but these releases – "Bells Ring", "Take All of Me", and "I Had a Dream" – did not chart.

== Members ==
- William Powers
- Charles Arbuckle
- Billy Meyers
- Chuck Weldon
- West Tyler

Joe Karp and Billy Meyers revived the group in 1965 as 'Joey and the Paradons'.
