= Les Mitchel =

American radio director, producer and actor (1904–1975)

- Born: Lester Mandiville Mitchel; October 27, 1904; Malinta, Henry County, Ohio, U.S.
- Died: January 12, 1975 (aged 70); Sacramento, California, U.S.
- Other name: Les Mitchell
- Education: University of Toledo
- Occupations: Radio and film producer, director and actor; television actor
- Years active: 1923–1975
- Spouse(s): Florence Lillian Aubry; 1925–? Elaine Beeson; 1939–? Madelon Baker; 1942–1952; div. Lovita Pauline Scrydloff (née Strohbach); 1953–? Tracy Parsons; 1971
- Children: 3

Lester Mandiville Mitchel (October 27, 1904 – January 12, 1975) was an American film actor and radio producer, director and actor, known for directing Stars over Hollywood and Backstage Wife, as well as hosting, producing and directing Skippy Hollywood Theatre.

== Early life ==
Born in Malinta in Henry County, Ohio, Mitchel was the son of Jeremiah Ezekiel Mitchel and Myrtle Lucy Fairbank. He attended the University of Toledo.

== Radio career ==
Mitchel made his radio debut in Detroit in 1935, later serving as producer, actor, writer and announcer on several Detroit stations. He joined WBBM in Chicago as a producer in 1939 and four years later was appointed assistant program director in charge of commercial broadcasts in 1943.

On May 31, 1942, on WBBM, Mitchel directed the Columbia Workshop's world premiere presentation of poet Kenneth Patchen's radio play The City Wears a Slouch Hat, accompanied by a five-member percussion ensemble performing John Cage's score, conducted by the composer. The cast included Mitchell's soon-to-be wife Madelon Grayson (né Baker), Les Tremayne, Forrest Lewis, Jonathan Hole, Frank Dane, and John Larkin.

In August 1942, Mitchel succeeded Blair Walliser as director of The Romance of Helen Trent. In June 1944, he was hired as director of The Dreft Star Playhouse. At approximately the same time, Mitchel succeeded Paul Pierce as producer-director of Stars Over Broadway.

From 1947 to 1950, Mitchel produced, directed and hosted Skippy Hollywood Theatre; he also occasionally starred on the show.

In 1951, he directed 26 episodes of Orson Welles's The Adventures of Harry Lime.

As of October 1958, Mitchel was an instructor at the Virginia Rose School of Arts in Sunland-Tujunga, Los Angeles. The following year he produced, directed, and starred in a revival of Death Takes a Holiday, playwright Walter Ferris's English-language adaptation of Alberto Casella's La morte in vacanza. (Note: Ferris's adaptation was the basis for the like-named 1934 film starring Fredric March.)

== Film and television ==
Mitchel's 1951 documentary short subject, Maya Are People, was acquired the following year by the San Diego Museum of Man and screened on April 22, 1952.

A second short subject, People of Oaxaca (likely made during the same visit to Mexico and presumably now lost), concerns the Zapotec peoples of Oaxaca in southern Mexico. The film received what may have been its world premiere in November 1952 on WGAL in Lancaster, Pennsylvania, where it aired on consecutive Saturday mornings, November 8 and 15. It next surfaced with Mitchel's Maya on October 17, 1954, as the two formed the back end of a trio of shorts screened at the Memorial Art Gallery in Rochester, New York. It returned to the Gallery three weeks later, minus Maya and grouped intentionally with two utterly unrelated shorts. Subsequent sightings extend at least as far as February 1959, when the film was screened at the main branch of the Cincinnati Public Library.

== Later career ==
Beginning in 1961 and continuing through 1973, Mitchel was a prominent figure in the Religious Science movement. At his death, Variety reported that this portion of his career was "headquartered, variously, in Oklahoma City, Cleveland and Alburquerque." Contemporaneous newspaper listings indicate that, for at least one six month period (December 1964–May 1965), Mitchel hosted a 30-minute, weekly, eponymous Sunday evening radio program on KTOK in Oklahoma City. The Sacramento Bee confirms that he founded Religious Science Churches in Oklahoma City in 1964—during which time he also helped establish one in Albuquerque—and Cleveland in 1968, before settling in Sacramento in 1971, where he succeeded the outgoing Rev. Lester M. Bashara as minister of the Sacramento Church of Religious Science. Upon his death, he was succeeded by his then wife, the former Tracy Parsons.

== Personal life and death ==
Mitchel was married at least five times: to Florence Lillian Aubry in 1925; to Elaine Beeson, as of 1939; to Madelon Grayson (née Baker) from 1942 to 1952, to Lovita Pauline Scrydloff (née Lohbach) in March 1953, and, from 1971 until his death, Tracy Parsons, with whom he had a daughter, Leslie Mitchel. Mitchel had at least two other children, including a daughter, Delores, with his first wife, and a son, Jerry, with his second.

A longtime resident of Sunland-Tujunga, Mitchel attained a double distinction in 1950: becoming both the neighborhood's first honorary mayor (Note: The honorary mayoralty continued through at least 1952.) and the president of the local chamber of commerce.

== Filmography ==
=== Film ===
Year	Title	Role	Notes
1949	Once More, My Darling	None	Dialogue director (uncredited)
1950	The Return of Jesse James	None	Dialogue director, assistant producer (uncredited)
1951	Maya Are People	Self (uncredited)	Documentary short subject, directed by Mitchel
1951	People of Oaxaca	Self (uncredited)	Documentary short subject, directed by Mitchel
1957	Outlaw's Son	Bill Somerson	

=== Television ===
Year	Title	Role	Notes
1956	Dragnet, episode "The Big Revision"	Unknown	
1956	The Roy Rogers Show, ep. "Head for Cover"	Unknown	
1956	The Roy Rogers Show, ep. "Paleface Justice"	Unknown	
1956	Sergeant Preston of the Yukon, ep. "Emergency on Scarface Flat"	Basil Ogden	
1956	The Roy Rogers Show, ep. "Fighting Sire"	Outlaw	
1957	The Adventures of Jim Bowie, ep. "The Beggar of New Orleans"	Gorley	
1958	Dragnet, ep. "The Big Gent"	Unknown	
