= Del Castillo (organist) =

U.S. theatre organist (1893–1992)

- Also known as: Lloyd Del Castillo, Lloyd Gould del Castillo
- Born: Lloyd Gould Castillo; April 2, 1893; Boston, Massachusetts, U.S.
- Died: July 6, 1992 (aged 99) Los Angeles, California, U.S.
- Occupations: Organist, composer
- Instrument: Cinema organ/ theatre organ
- Years active: 1915–1989

Del Castillo (born Lloyd Gould Castillo, (Note: Despite the fact that in every relevant document for which Del Castillo himself was the source (e.g. 1917 Draft registration, miscellaneous copyright applications and the 1930 census form), he specifies del Castillo, the fact remains that in every such document to which his father had earlier supplied such info (i.e. the original birth registration and the 1900 and 1910 census forms), he is referred to simply as Lloyd G. Castillo (and his father as Frank M. Castillo). Even the 1992 LA Times obit, while not dispensing with "del" altogether, includes it only parenthetically—as "Lloyd G. (del) Castillo".) April 2, 1893 – July 6, 1992), was an American cinema organist, theatre organist and composer, who provided music for radio series such as Stars over Hollywood, Hollywood Theatre of Today, and Satan's Waitin' , as well as a number of animated short subjects, including several featuring Mr. Magoo. In addition, he served for several years as both program director and staff organist at WEEI (AM) in Boston.

== Early life and career ==
Castillo was born in Boston, Massachusetts, the only child of Dr. and Mrs. Frank Martin Castillo. Mrs. Castillo, the former Minnie May Gould, was herself an accomplished pianist and graduate of the Boston Conservatory of Music, who also performed with Caroline Nichols' Fadettes of Boston. She personally saw to Lloyd's early training, giving him piano lessons at age 4. Shortly thereafter he attended the Faelton Pianoforte School, and, by age nine, was performing in public. He continued his studies at Rindge Manual Training School and later attended Harvard University, where he served for two years as conductor of the Pierian Sodality before graduating in 1914.

Daily News critic Ben Gross, in an otherwise dismissive review of the short-lived summer replacement radio series Satan's Waitin', wrote: "The best part of it to this listener was the eerie, howling background music provided by Del Castillo, organist, and Dr. Samuel Hoffman, playing the theremin."

Castillo also founded a school for theatrical organists, the first such school in Boston. Among his students was longtime Fenway Park and Boston Garden organist John Kiley.

== Personal life and death ==
Scarcely two months into Castillo's sophomore year at Harvard, The Boston Globe recounted, in rapid succession, the indictment, arrest and conviction of his father, Dr. Frank del Castillo, sentenced to three to five years in Massachusetts State Prison after "plead[ing] guilty to an illegal operation involving Annie Gallagher Sept. 6."

From June 15, 1920, until her death on June 14, 1975, Castillo was married to Phyllis Arlene Woolley.

On July 6, 1992, Lloyd Castillo died in Los Angeles at age ninety-nine.
