= List of Metro-Goldwyn-Mayer animated short films =

The following list is a filmography of all animated short subjects distributed by the Metro-Goldwyn-Mayer (MGM) motion picture studio through Loew's Incorporated between 1937 and 1958 and between 1961 and 1967. Cartoons produced by external companies, such as Harman-Ising Productions and Animated Pictures are not included.

== Metro-Goldwyn-Mayer cartoon department (1938–1958) ==
=== 1938-1945 ===
No animators, storymen and composers were credited until Blitz Wolf (1942). No storymen are credited on Tom and Jerry cartoons.

Release date	Series	Title	Director	Animator	Story	Prod. Code	Notes	Availability
February 11, 1938	The Captain and the Kids	Blue Monday	William Hanna			3	First of three cartoons solely directed by William Hanna.; First Captain and the Kids cartoon.; First cartoon to be produced in-house.; First cartoon to feature the Jackie logo	
February 12, 1938 (Note: Archived from a February 15 article, this is based on the fact that new cartoon shorts would typically premiere in theaters on Saturdays.) (earliest known date)	The Captain and the Kids	Cleaning House	Robert Allen			2	First cartoon directed by Robert Allen.	
April 16, 1938	The Captain and the Kids	Poultry Pirates	Friz Freleng			5	First MGM cartoon to be directed by Friz Freleng.	
April 30, 1938	The Captain and the Kids	The Captain's Pup	Robert Allen			4	First MGM cartoon to be animated by Richard Bickenbach.	
June 25, 1938	The Captain and the Kids	A Day at the Beach	Friz Freleng			10		
July 16, 1938	The Captain and the Kids	What a Lion!	William Hanna			12	Second of three cartoons solely directed by William Hanna.; Originally the first cartoon produced in-house at MGM under the title Lion Hunters under a "1" production code. However, it was heavily reworked and became the 12th cartoon in production code order.	
August 6, 1938	The Captain and the Kids	The Pygmy Hunt	Friz Freleng			7		
September 3, 1938	The Captain and the Kids	Old Smokey	William Hanna			6	Last of three cartoons solely directed by William Hanna.	
September 17, 1938	The Captain and the Kids	Buried Treasure	Robert Allen			11		
October 1, 1938	The Captain and the Kids	The Winning Ticket	Burt Gillett			13	Only MGM cartoon directed by Burt Gillett.	
October 15, 1938	The Captain and the Kids	Honduras Hurricane	Friz Freleng			14		
December 8, 1938 (earliest known date)	The Captain and the Kids	Petunia Natural Park	Friz Freleng			15	Last of two Captain and the Kids cartoons filmed in Three-strip Technicolor by production code, but the first to be released. It is also the first MGM cartoon filmed in Three-strip Technicolor since An Optical Poem.; Features a rotoscoped color variation of the Jackie logo.	
December 10, 1938	The Captain and the Kids	The Captain's Christmas	Friz Freleng			9	First of two Captain and the Kids cartoons filmed in Three-strip Technicolor by production code, but the last to be released.; Also features a rotoscoped color variation of the Jackie logo.	
January 21, 1939 (Note: Archived from a January 22 article, this is based on the fact that new cartoon shorts would typically premiere in theaters on Saturdays.) (earliest known date)	The Captain and the Kids	Seal Skinners	Friz Freleng			16	Final Captain and the Kids cartoon produced.	
February 11, 1939	The Captain and the Kids	Mama's New Hat	Friz Freleng			8	Final Captain and the Kids cartoon in overall release order.	
February 25, 1939	Count Screwloose and J.R. The Wonder Dog	Jitterbug Follies	Milt Gross			18	First of two Milt Gross Count Screwloose cartoons.	
March 18, 1939	Count Screwloose and J.R. The Wonder Dog	Wanted: No Master	Milt Gross			22	Last of two Milt Gross Count Screwloose cartoons.; Final black-and-white cartoon produced by MGM. All cartoons after are in color going forward.; Final cartoon to feature the Jackie logo.	
March 15, 1939	—N/a	The Little Goldfish	Rudolf Ising			29	Original produced for Disney as a Silly Symphony cartoon.; Earliest MGM cartoon to be reissued.; First cartoon to feature the Tanner logo as well as the first cartoon featuring the MGM cartoon fanfare.; First cartoon directed by Rudolf Ising for the studio.	
May 13, 1939	—N/a	Art Gallery	Hugh Harman			26	Third and last Good Little Monkeys cartoon.; First cartoon directed by Hugh Harman for the studio.	
June 10, 1939	Barney Bear	The Bear That Couldn't Sleep	Rudolf Ising			31	First appearance of Barney Bear.; Originally released as a one-shot cartoon but later re-released as part of the Barney Bear series.	
July 14, 1939	—N/a	Goldilocks and the Three Bears	Hugh Harman			30	Originally produced for Disney.; First appearance of The Bear Family.; First cartoon to be given a reissue.	
August 19, 1939 (Note: Archived from an August 18 article, this is based on the fact that new cartoon shorts would typically premiere in theaters on Saturdays.) (earliest known date)	—N/a	The Bookworm	Friz Freleng			28	First appearances of the Bookworm and the Raven.; First cartoon to be directed by Freleng under Hugh Harman's unit.	
September 30, 1939	—N/a	One Mother's Family	Rudolf Ising			34		
October 28, 1939	—N/a	The Blue Danube	Hugh Harman			37	Based on the 1867 waltz of the same name by Johann Strauss II.	
December 6, 1939 (earliest known date)	—N/a	Peace on Earth	Hugh Harman			40		
December 30, 1939	—N/a	The Mad Maestro	Friz Freleng			38	Second and final cartoon to be directed by Freleng under Hugh Harman's unit.	
January 10, 1940 (earliest known date)	Barney Bear	The Fishing Bear	Rudolf Ising			41		
February 10, 1940	Tom and Jerry	Puss Gets the Boot	William Hanna & Joseph Barbera			42	Originally produced as a one-shot cartoon, it became the first cartoon in the Tom and Jerry cartoon series.; Tom and Jerry originally had different names as shown in this cartoon, Jasper and Jinx.; First appearance of Mammy Two-Shoes.; First cartoon co-directed by Joseph Barbera.; Directed at Rudolf Ising's unit.	
March 23, 1940	—N/a	Home on the Range	Rudolf Ising			44		
April 20, 1940	—N/a	A Rainy Day	Hugh Harman			45		
May 18, 1940	—N/a	Swing Social	William Hanna & Joseph Barbera			43	First cartoon to be directed by the Hanna-Barbera unit.	
June 8, 1940	—N/a	Tom Turkey and His Harmonica Humdingers	Hugh Harman			46		
June 22, 1940	—N/a	The Milky Way	Rudolf Ising			P39	First Academy Award for Best Animated Short for a cartoon not released by Disney, also the first MGM cartoon to win an Academy Award.	
July 20, 1940	—N/a	The Bookworm Turns	Hugh Harman			49		
August 10, 1940	—N/a	Romeo in Rhythm	Rudolf Ising			47	Ising was not credited for unknown reasons.	
September 6, 1940	—N/a	Papa Gets the Bird	Hugh Harman			50	Last Bear Family cartoon.	
October 12, 1940	—N/a	The Homeless Flea	Rudolf Ising			54		
October 26, 1940	—N/a	Gallopin' Gals	William Hanna & Joseph Barbera			51		
November 21, 1940 (earliest known date)	—N/a	The Lonesome Stranger	Hugh Harman			53		
December 21, 1940	—N/a	Mrs. Ladybug	Rudolf Ising			56		
January 22, 1941	—N/a	Abdul the Bulbul-Ameer	Hugh Harman			52		
March 8, 1941	Barney Bear	The Prospecting Bear	Rudolf Ising			66		
April 5, 1941	—N/a	The Little Mole	Hugh Harman			58		
April 26, 1941	—N/a	The Goose Goes South	William Hanna & Joseph Barbera			55		
May 17, 1941	Barney Bear	The Rookie Bear	Rudolf Ising			68		
June 7, 1941	—N/a	Dance of the Weed	Rudolf Ising			63		
July 5, 1941	—N/a	The Alley Cat	Hugh Harman			61	The main characters later evolved into Butch and Toodles in the Tom and Jerry series.	
July 19, 1941	Tom and Jerry	The Midnight Snack	William Hanna & Joseph Barbera			60	First official Tom and Jerry cartoon.	
August 30, 1941	—N/a	Little Cesario	Robert Allen			48	Directed under Rudolf Ising's unit.	
September 6, 1941	—N/a	Officer Pooch	William Hanna & Joseph Barbera			67		
November 1, 1941	Barney Bear	The Flying Bear	Rudolf Ising & Robert Allen			72		
December 6, 1941	Tom and Jerry	The Night Before Christmas	William Hanna & Joseph Barbera			78		
December 27, 1941	—N/a	The Field Mouse	Hugh Harman			59		
January 17, 1942	Tom and Jerry	Fraidy Cat	William Hanna & Joseph Barbera			69		
February 21, 1942	—N/a	The Hungry Wolf	Hugh Harman			70	Last MGM cartoon directed by Hugh Harman. His unit was overtaken by Tex Avery.	
March 14, 1942	—N/a	The First Swallow	Jerry Brewer			71	Directed under Rudolf Ising's unit.	
March 28, 1942	Barney Bear	The Bear and the Beavers	Rudolf Ising			75		
April 18, 1942	Tom and Jerry	Dog Trouble	William Hanna & Joseph Barbera			64	First appearance of Spike the Dog.	
May 16, 1942	—N/a	Little Gravel Voice	Rudolf Ising			57		
May 30, 1942	Tom and Jerry	Puss 'n' Toots	William Hanna & Joseph Barbera			74	First appearance of Toots.	
July 4, 1942	—N/a	Bats in the Belfry	Jerry Brewer			76	Directed under Rudolf Ising's unit.	
July 18, 1942	Tom and Jerry	The Bowling Alley Cat	William Hanna & Joseph Barbera			79	Final MGM cartoon with the fanfare opening and without animation/story credits.	
August 22, 1942	—N/a	Blitz Wolf	Tex Avery	Ray Abrams, Irven Spence, Preston Blair & Ed Love	Rich Hogan	86	First MGM cartoon to be directed by Tex Avery, replacing Hugh Harman. This was the first Avery cartoon to be released, but not the first produced however.; First MGM cartoon with full credits.; First appearance of Slick McWolf.; First MGM cartoon written by Rich Hogan.; First MGM cartoon to feature the "Tiger Rag" opening gag as the theme tune.	
August 29, 1942	—N/a	The Early Bird Dood It!	Tex Avery	Irven Spence, Preston Blair, Ed Love & Ray Abrams	Rich Hogan	84	First MGM cartoon produced to be directed by Tex Avery.	
September 12, 1942	—N/a	Chips Off the Old Block	Robert Allen	Carl Urbano & Al Grandmain		77	Directed under Rudolf Ising's unit.	
October 10, 1942	Tom and Jerry	Fine Feathered Friend	William Hanna & Joseph Barbera	Kenneth Muse, Pete Burness, George Gordon, Jack Zander & Bill Littlejohn		81	First Tom and Jerry cartoon with animation credits.; Last MGM cartoon to use the "Tiger Rag" opening gag as the theme tune, not heard in reissue.; Final MGM cartoon animated by Bill Littlejohn. Although credited in its original release, he went uncredited in its reissue.	
November 7, 1942	Barney Bear	Wild Honey (How to Get Along Without a Ration Book)	Rudolf Ising	Michael Lah, Rudy Zamora & Don Williams	Henry Allen	83	First Barney Bear cartoon where the character is identified by that name.; First Barney Bear cartoon with animation credits.; First MGM cartoon with "Runnin' Wild" as the theme tune.	
December 26, 1942	Barney Bear	Barney Bear's Victory Garden	Rudolf Ising	Carl Urbano, Michael Lah, Don Williams & Rudy Zamora		90		
January 16, 1943	Tom and Jerry	Sufferin' Cats!	William Hanna & Joseph Barbera	Kenneth Muse, George Gordon, Pete Burness & Jack Zander		85	First appearance of Meathead.; Features "Runnin' Wild" as the theme tune.	
February 13, 1943	Barney Bear	Bah Wilderness	Rudolf Ising	Michael Lah, Carl Urbano, Preston Blair & Rudy Zamora		87		
March 20, 1943	Droopy	Dumb-Hounded	Tex Avery			92	First appearance of Droopy, although he is not identified by that name yet.; Features "Runnin' Wild" as the theme tune.	
April 24, 1943	—N/a	The Boy and the Wolf	Rudolf Ising			95		
May 8, 1943	—N/a	Red Hot Riding Hood	Tex Avery			88	First appearance of Red Hot Riding Hood.; Features "Runnin' Wild" as the theme tune.	
May 22, 1943	Tom and Jerry	The Lonesome Mouse	William Hanna & Joseph Barbera	George Gordon, Kenneth Muse, Jack Zander, Irven Spence, Al Grandmain & Pete Burness		89		
June 19, 1943	—N/a	Who Killed Who?	Tex Avery			94		
June 26, 1943	Tom and Jerry	The Yankee Doodle Mouse	William Hanna & Joseph Barbera	Irven Spence, Pete Burness, Kenneth Muse, George Gordon & Jack Zander		91	First of seven Tom and Jerry shorts, and the second MGM cartoon overall, to win an Academy Award.; Jack Zander was originally credited in its initial release, but went uncredited in the reissue.	
July 16, 1943	Barney Bear	Barney Bear and the Uninvited Pest	Rudolf Ising			98	Final MGM cartoon by directed by Rudolf Ising, his unit would be overtaken by George Gordon.; Final MGM cartoon that lacked any animation credits. All cartoons after this would credit their animators going forward.	
August 14, 1943	—N/a	One Ham's Family	Tex Avery	Ray Abrams, Preston Blair & Ed Love		97		
October 9, 1943	—N/a	War Dogs	William Hanna & Joseph Barbera	Pete Burness, Kenneth Muse, Irven Spence & Jack Zander		96	Final non-Tom and Jerry cartoon directed by William Hanna and Joseph Barbera until 1955.	
October 23, 1943	—N/a	The Stork's Holiday	George Gordon	Michael Lah, Rudy Zamora, Carl Urbano, Don Williams & Al Grandmain	Otto Englander & Webb Smith	101	First cartoon directed by George Gordon, and the only cartoon to credit him as director.	
October 30, 1943 (Note: Archived from an October 31 article, this is based on the fact that new cartoon shorts would usually premiere in theaters on Saturdays.)	Tom and Jerry	Baby Puss	William Hanna & Joseph Barbera	Kenneth Muse, Ray Patterson, Irven Spence & Pete Burness		99	First appearances of Nancy, Butch, and Topsy.	
November 27, 1943	—N/a	What's Buzzin' Buzzard?	Tex Avery	Ed Love, Ray Abrams & Preston Blair		100		
January 22, 1944	—N/a	Innertube Antics	George Gordon	Michael Lah, Ed Barge & Arnold Gillespie		103	First of two Ol' Doc Donkey cartoons.	
February 26, 1944	Tom and Jerry	The Zoot Cat	William Hanna & Joseph Barbera	Ray Patterson, Kenneth Muse, Irven Spence & Pete Burness		104		
March 1944	A Few Quick Facts	AIR&NAVY/China/Safety	George Gordon	Arnold Gillespie & Ray Patterson		130	Not an official MGM cartoon, despite being produced by the cartoon studio itself. It was featured in the A Few Quick Facts series and released as part of the Army-Navy Screen Magazine issue No. 22.	
April 1, 1944	—N/a	Screwball Squirrel	Tex Avery	Preston Blair, Ed Love & Ray Abrams		107	First appearance of Screwy Squirrel.	
April 22, 1944	—N/a	Batty Baseball	Tex Avery	Ray Abrams, Preston Blair & Ed Love		105	Story by Rich Hogan	
April 24, 1944	A Few Quick Facts	US Soldier/Bullet/Diarrhea & Dysentery	Tex Avery & John Hubley	Irven Spence		133	Not an official MGM cartoon, despite being produced by the cartoon studio itself. It was featured in the A Few Quick Facts series and released as part of the Army-Navy Screen Magazine issue No. 24.; An alternate version of the US Soldier segment exists with different audio and wording.; Co-animated by UPA, hence being co-directed by John Hubley.	
May 6, 1944	Tom and Jerry	The Million Dollar Cat	William Hanna & Joseph Barbera	Irven Spence, Kenneth Muse, Pete Burness & Ray Patterson		109		
May 26, 1944	A Few Quick Facts	USS Iowa/Brain/Shoes	George Gordon	Arnold Gillespie & Ray Patterson		135; 136	Not an official MGM cartoon, despite being produced by the cartoon studio itself. It was featured in the A Few Quick Facts series and released as part of the Army-Navy Screen Magazine issue No. 26.; Only MGM cartoon to be produced under two production codes.	
June 3, 1944	—N/a	The Tree Surgeon	George Gordon	Michael Lah, Ed Barge & Arnold Gillespie		106	Final of two Ol' Doc Donkey cartoons.	
June 24, 1944	Screwy Squirrel	Happy-Go-Nutty	Tex Avery	Preston Blair, Ed Love & Ray Abrams		111		
July 1944	A Few Quick Facts	Chaplain Corps./Accidents/Gas	William Hanna & Joseph Barbera	Kenneth Muse & Pete Burness		139	Not an official MGM cartoon, despite being produced by the cartoon studio itself. It was featured in the A Few Quick Facts series and released as part of the Army-Navy Screen Magazine issue No. 30.	
July 22, 1944	Tom and Jerry	The Bodyguard	William Hanna & Joseph Barbera	Kenneth Muse, Pete Burness, Ray Patterson & Irven Spence		114		
September 9, 1944	Barney Bear	Bear Raid Warden	George Gordon	Michael Lah, Ed Barge, Arnold Gillespie & Jack Carr		108		
October 21, 1944	Screwy Squirrel	Big Heel-Watha (Buck of the Month)	Tex Avery	Preston Blair, Ed Love & Ray Abrams		115		
October 28, 1944	Tom and Jerry	Puttin' on the Dog	William Hanna & Joseph Barbera	Pete Burness, Ray Patterson, Irven Spence & Kenneth Muse		117		
November 23, 1944	Tom and Jerry	Mouse Trouble	William Hanna & Joseph Barbera	Ray Patterson, Irven Spence, Kenneth Muse & Pete Burness		118		
December 30, 1944	Barney Bear	Barney Bear's Polar Pest	George Gordon	Michael Lah, Ed Barge, Arnold Gillespie & Jack Carr		113		
January 13, 1945	Screwy Squirrel	The Screwy Truant	Tex Avery	Preston Blair, Ed Love & Ray Abrams		120		
February 17, 1945	Barney Bear	The Unwelcome Guest	George Gordon & Michael Lah	Michael Lah, Ed Barge & Jack Carr		116	Final in-house MGM cartoon directed by George Gordon, he continued directing cartoons under John Sutherland for which are still distributed by MGM themselves.; Although Gordon is often cited as the director, Lah claimed to have co-directed this cartoon.	
March 3, 1945	Droopy	The Shooting of Dan McGoo	Tex Avery	Ed Love, Ray Abrams & Preston Blair		122	First of two cartoons featuring Droopy, Wolfie, and Red.; Loose remake of Dangerous Dan McFoo.	
April 7, 1945	—N/a	Jerky Turkey	Tex Avery	Preston Blair, Ed Love & Ray Abrams		124	Public domain	
May 5, 1945	Tom and Jerry	The Mouse Comes to Dinner	William Hanna & Joseph Barbera	Irven Spence, Kenneth Muse, Pete Burness & Ray Patterson		123		
July 7, 1945	Tom and Jerry	Mouse in Manhattan	William Hanna & Joseph Barbera	Kenneth Muse, Ray Patterson, Irven Spence & Ed Barge		132		
July 21, 1945	Tom and Jerry	Tee for Two	William Hanna & Joseph Barbera	Ray Patterson, Pete Burness, Irven Spence & Kenneth Muse		126		
August 25, 1945	—N/a	Swing Shift Cinderella	Tex Avery	Ray Abrams, Preston Blair & Ed Love		128		
September 22, 1945	Tom and Jerry	Flirty Birdy	William Hanna & Joseph Barbera	Irven Spence, Kenneth Muse & Ray Patterson		129		

=== 1945-1958 ===
Release Date	Series	Title	Director	Prod. code	Notes	Availability
November 3, 1945	Droopy	Wild and Woolfy	Tex Avery	134	• Second of two cartoons featuring Droopy, Wolfie, and Red.	• Tex Avery Screwball Classics: Volume 3 DVD and Blu-ray. • Tex Avery's Droopy: The Complete Theatrical Collection DVD • Extra on the DVD of Thrill of a Romance.
December 22, 1945	Tom and Jerry	Quiet Please!	William Hanna & Joseph Barbera	131		• Tom and Jerry Golden Collection: Volume 1 Blu-ray. • Extra on the DVD and Blu-ray of The Picture of Dorian Gray. • Warner Bros. Home Entertainment Academy Awards Animation Collection: 15 Winners DVD. • Warner Bros. Home Entertainment Academy Awards Animation Collection DVD. • Tom and Jerry Spotlight Collection: Volume 1 DVD. • Tom and Jerry: The Classic Collection: Volume 1 DVD.
March 9, 1946	Screwy Squirrel	Lonesome Lenny	Tex Avery	138	• Final Screwy Squirrel cartoon.	• Tex Avery Screwball Classics: Volume 1 DVD and Blu-ray.
March 30, 1946	Tom and Jerry	Springtime for Thomas	William Hanna & Joseph Barbera	137		• Tom and Jerry Golden Collection: Volume 1 Blu-ray. • Tom and Jerry Spotlight Collection: Volume 2 DVD. • Tom and Jerry: The Classic Collection: Volume 1 DVD.
May 18, 1946	Tom and Jerry	The Milky Waif	William Hanna & Joseph Barbera	139	• First appearance of Nibbles/Tuffy. • First cartoon to credit Fred Quimby as the producer.	• Tom and Jerry Golden Collection: Volume 1 Blu-ray. • Tom and Jerry Spotlight Collection: Volume 1 DVD. • Tom and Jerry: The Classic Collection: Volume 1 DVD.
June 15, 1946	—N/a	The Hick Chick	Tex Avery	141		• Tex Avery Screwball Classics: Volume 1 DVD and Blu-ray. • Extra on the DVD and Blu-ray of Ziegfeld Follies.
June 29, 1946	Tom and Jerry	Trap Happy	William Hanna & Joseph Barbera	145		• Tom and Jerry Golden Collection: Volume 1 Blu-ray. • Tom and Jerry: Tricks & Treats DVD. • Tom and Jerry Spotlight Collection: Volume 2 DVD. • Tom and Jerry: The Classic Collection: Volume 1 DVD.
August 3, 1946	Droopy	Northwest Hounded Police	Tex Avery	144		• Tex Avery Screwball Classics: Volume 3 DVD and Blu-ray. • Tex Avery's Droopy: The Complete Theatrical Collection DVD • Extra on the DVD of Courage of Lassie.
August 31, 1946	Tom and Jerry	Solid Serenade	William Hanna & Joseph Barbera	149		• Tom and Jerry Golden Collection: Volume 1 Blu-ray. • Tom and Jerry Spotlight Collection: Volume 1 DVD. • Tom and Jerry: The Classic Collection: Volume 2 DVD. • Extra on the DVD of Courage of Lassie. • Extra on the DVD and Blu-ray of Ziegfeld Follies.
October 26, 1946	—N/a	Henpecked Hoboes	Tex Avery	148	• First appearances of George and Junior.	• Extra on the DVD of Till the Clouds Roll By.
February 22, 1947	Tom and Jerry	Cat Fishin'	William Hanna & Joseph Barbera	155		• Tom and Jerry Golden Collection: Volume 1 Blu-ray. • Extra on the DVD and Blu-ray of The Pirate. • Tom and Jerry Spotlight Collection: Volume 1 DVD. • Tom and Jerry: The Classic Collection: Volume 2 DVD.
March 15, 1947	Tom and Jerry	Part Time Pal	William Hanna & Joseph Barbera	153		• Tom and Jerry Golden Collection: Volume 1 Blu-ray. • Tom and Jerry Spotlight Collection: Volume 2 DVD. • Tom and Jerry: The Classic Collection: Volume 2 DVD.
April 12, 1947	—N/a	Hound Hunters	Tex Avery	151	• Features George and Junior	• Tex Avery Screwball Classics: Volume 1 DVD and Blu-ray. • Extra on the DVD of Fiesta.
April 26, 1947	Tom and Jerry	The Cat Concerto	William Hanna & Joseph Barbera	165		• Tom and Jerry Golden Collection: Volume 1 Blu-ray. • Extra on the DVD and Blu-ray of The Yearling. • Warner Bros. Home Entertainment Academy Awards Animation Collection: 15 Winners DVD. • Warner Bros. Home Entertainment Academy Awards Animation Collection DVD. • Tom and Jerry Spotlight Collection: Volume 1 DVD. • Tom and Jerry: The Classic Collection: Volume 2 DVD.
May 3, 1947	—N/a	Red Hot Rangers	Tex Avery	150	• Features George and Junior • Last MGM cartoon animated by Ed Love.	• Tex Avery Screwball Classics: Volume 1 DVD and Blu-ray. • Extra on the DVD of Tycoon.
June 14, 1947	Tom and Jerry	Dr. Jekyll and Mr. Mouse	William Hanna & Joseph Barbera	157		• Tom and Jerry Golden Collection: Volume 1 Blu-ray. • Warner Bros. Home Entertainment Academy Award Nominated Animation: Cinema Favorites DVD. • Warner Bros. Home Entertainment Academy Awards Animation Collection DVD. • Extra on the DVD of This Time for Keeps. • Tom and Jerry Spotlight Collection: Volume 2 DVD. • Tom and Jerry: The Classic Collection: Volume 2 DVD.
July 12, 1947	Tom and Jerry	Salt Water Tabby	William Hanna & Joseph Barbera	158		• Tom and Jerry Golden Collection: Volume 1 Blu-ray. • Tom and Jerry: Mouse Trouble DVD. • Tom and Jerry Spotlight Collection: Volume 1 DVD. • Tom and Jerry: The Classic Collection: Volume 2 DVD.
July 19, 1947	—N/a	Uncle Tom's Cabana	Tex Avery	152		
August 30, 1947	Tom and Jerry	A Mouse in the House	William Hanna & Joseph Barbera	162		• Tom and Jerry Golden Collection: Volume 1 Blu-ray. • Tom and Jerry Spotlight Collection: Volume 3 DVD. • Tom and Jerry: The Classic Collection: Volume 2 DVD.
September 20, 1947	—N/a	Slap Happy Lion	Tex Avery	154		• Tex Avery Screwball Classics: Volume 3 DVD and Blu-ray. • Extra on the DVD and Blu-ray of Song of the Thin Man.
September 27, 1947	Tom and Jerry	The Invisible Mouse	William Hanna & Joseph Barbera	163		• Tom and Jerry Golden Collection: Volume 1 Blu-ray. • Tom and Jerry: Mouse Trouble DVD. • Tom and Jerry Spotlight Collection: Volume 1 DVD. • Tom and Jerry: The Classic Collection: Volume 2 DVD.
December 6, 1947	—N/a	King-Size Canary	Tex Avery	156		• Tex Avery Screwball Classics: Volume 3 DVD and Blu-ray. • Extra on the Blu-ray of Looney Tunes Platinum Collection: Volume 2. • Extra on the DVD of Command Decision.
January 30, 1948	Barney Bear	The Bear and the Bean	Preston Blair & Michael Lah	161	• Supervised by William Hanna and Joseph Barbera.	
March 20, 1948	—N/a	What Price Fleadom	Tex Avery	159	• Last appearance of Homer Flea.	• Tex Avery Screwball Classics: Volume 3 DVD and Blu-ray. • Extra on the DVD and Blu-ray of The Three Musketeers.
June 1, 1948	Tom and Jerry	Kitty Foiled	William Hanna & Joseph Barbera	167		• Tom and Jerry Golden Collection: Volume 1 Blu-ray. • Tom and Jerry: Mouse Trouble DVD. • Tom and Jerry Spotlight Collection: Volume 1 DVD. • Tom and Jerry: The Classic Collection: Volume 2 DVD.
June 15, 1948	—N/a	Little 'Tinker	Tex Avery	164		• Tex Avery Screwball Classics: Volume 3 DVD and Blu-ray. • Extra on the DVD of The Bachelor and the Bobby-Soxer.
June 26, 1948	Barney Bear	The Bear and the Hare	Preston Blair & Michael Lah	166		• Extra on the DVD of On an Island with You.
July 17, 1948	Tom and Jerry	The Truce Hurts	William Hanna & Joseph Barbera	173		• Tom and Jerry Golden Collection: Volume 1 Blu-ray. • Tom and Jerry Spotlight Collection: Volume 1 DVD. • Tom and Jerry: The Classic Collection: Volume 2 DVD.
August 7, 1948	—N/a	Half-Pint Pygmy	Tex Avery	169	• Last appearances of George and Junior.	
September 18, 1948	Tom and Jerry	Old Rockin' Chair Tom	William Hanna & Joseph Barbera	172		• Tom and Jerry Golden Collection: Volume 1 Blu-ray. • Tom and Jerry Spotlight Collection: Volume 2 DVD. • Tom and Jerry: The Classic Collection: Volume 2 DVD.
October 9, 1948	—N/a	Lucky Ducky	Tex Avery	181	• Originally planned as a ' George and Junior cartoon.	
October 30, 1948	Tom and Jerry	Professor Tom	William Hanna & Joseph Barbera	179		• Tom and Jerry Golden Collection: Volume 1 Blu-ray. • Tom and Jerry Spotlight Collection: Volume 2 DVD. • Tom and Jerry: The Classic Collection: Volume 2 DVD. • Extra on the DVD of A Date with Judy.
November 20, 1948	—N/a	The Cat That Hated People	Tex Avery	171	• First appearance of Blackie the Cat	• Tex Avery Screwball Classics: Volume 2 DVD and Blu-ray. • Extra on the DVD of Words and Music.
December 11, 1948	Tom and Jerry	Mouse Cleaning	William Hanna & Joseph Barbera	182		• Tom and Jerry: The Classic Collection: Volume 2 DVD.
January 15, 1949	Barney Bear	Goggle Fishing Bear	Preston Blair & Michael Lah	168		
January 22, 1949	—N/a	Bad Luck Blackie	Tex Avery	175	• Featuring Blackie the Cat.	• Tex Avery Screwball Classics: Volume 1 DVD and Blu-ray. • Extra on the Blu-ray of Looney Tunes Platinum Collection: Volume 2.
February 26, 1949	Tom and Jerry	Polka-Dot Puss	William Hanna & Joseph Barbera	184		• Tom and Jerry Spotlight Collection: Volume 2 DVD. • Tom and Jerry: The Classic Collection: Volume 2 DVD.
April 9, 1949	Droopy	Señor Droopy	Tex Avery	185	• First Droopy cartoon in which he is identified by that name. • Last MGM cartoon animated by Preston Blair.	• Tex Avery Screwball Classics: Volume 3 DVD and Blu-ray. • Extra on the Blu-ray of Looney Tunes Platinum Collection: Volume 2. • Tex Avery's Droopy: The Complete Theatrical Collection DVD • Extra on the DVD of That Midnight Kiss.
April 30, 1949	Tom and Jerry	The Little Orphan	William Hanna & Joseph Barbera	191		• Warner Bros. Home Entertainment Academy Awards Animation Collection: 15 Winners DVD. • Warner Bros. Home Entertainment Academy Awards Animation Collection DVD. • Tom and Jerry Spotlight Collection: Volume 1 DVD. • Tom and Jerry: The Classic Collection: Volume 2 DVD.
May 14, 1949	Tom and Jerry	Hatch Up Your Troubles	William Hanna & Joseph Barbera	186		• Extra on the DVD and Blu-ray of Neptune's Daughter. • Warner Bros. Home Entertainment Academy Award-Nominated Animation: Golden Gems DVD. • Warner Bros. Home Entertainment Academy Awards Animation Collection DVD. • Tom and Jerry Spotlight Collection: Volume 3 DVD. • Tom and Jerry: The Classic Collection: Volume 2 DVD.
June 11, 1949	—N/a	The House of Tomorrow	Tex Avery	205		• Tex Avery Screwball Classics: Volume 2 DVD and Blu-ray. • Extra on the DVD and Blu-ray of Mr. Blandings Builds His Dream House.
July 9, 1949	Tom and Jerry	Heavenly Puss	William Hanna & Joseph Barbera	189		• Tom and Jerry: Winter Tails DVD. • Tom and Jerry Spotlight Collection: Volume 1 DVD. • Tom and Jerry: The Classic Collection: Volume 2 DVD.
July 30, 1949	—N/a	Doggone Tired	Tex Avery	190		• Tex Avery Screwball Classics: Volume 2 DVD and Blu-ray. • Extra on the DVD of On the Town.
August 13, 1949	Droopy	Wags to Riches	Tex Avery	196	• First appearance of Butch, named Spike on this cartoon. • First pairing of Droopy and Butch.	• Tex Avery Screwball Classics: Volume 1 DVD and Blu-ray. • Extra on the Blu-ray of Looney Tunes Platinum Collection: Volume 2. • Tex Avery's Droopy: The Complete Theatrical Collection DVD • Extra on the DVD of The Barkleys of Broadway.
September 3, 1949	Tom and Jerry	The Cat and the Mermouse	William Hanna & Joseph Barbera	194		• Extra on the DVD and Blu-ray of Dangerous When Wet. • Extra on the Blu-ray of Take Me Out to the Ball Game. • Tom and Jerry Spotlight Collection: Volume 2 DVD. • Tom and Jerry: The Classic Collection: Volume 2 DVD.
September 17, 1949	—N/a	Little Rural Riding Hood	Tex Avery	192	• Final cartoon featuring Red.	• Tex Avery Screwball Classics: Volume 2 DVD and Blu-ray. • Extra on the DVD and Blu-ray of Battleground.
October 1, 1949	Tom and Jerry	Love That Pup	William Hanna & Joseph Barbera	197	• First appearance of Tyke.	• Extra on the Blu-ray of Madame Bovary. • Tom and Jerry Spotlight Collection: Volume 3 DVD. • Tom and Jerry: The Classic Collection: Volume 2 DVD.
October 22, 1949	Tom and Jerry	Jerry's Diary	William Hanna & Joseph Barbera	198	• First Tom and Jerry "cheater" short, featuring scenes from Tee for Two, Mouse Trouble, Solid Serenade and The Yankee Doodle Mouse.	• Tom and Jerry Spotlight Collection: Volume 3 DVD. • Tom and Jerry: The Classic Collection: Volume 2 DVD.
November 5, 1949	Droopy	Out Foxed	Tex Avery	187		• Tex Avery Screwball Classics: Volume 2 DVD and Blu-ray. • Tex Avery's Droopy: The Complete Theatrical Collection DVD • Extra on the DVD of Madame Bovary.
December 10, 1949	Tom and Jerry	Tennis Chumps	William Hanna & Joseph Barbera	200		• Tom and Jerry Spotlight Collection: Volume 3 DVD. • Tom and Jerry: The Classic Collection: Volume 2 DVD.
December 24, 1949	—N/a	The Counterfeit Cat	Tex Avery	202	• Featuring Blackie the Cat and Butch.	• Tex Avery Screwball Classics: Volume 2 DVD and Blu-ray. • Extra on the DVD of East Side, West Side.
January 7, 1950	Tom and Jerry	Little Quacker	William Hanna & Joseph Barbera	209	• First appearance of Little Quacker.	• Extra on the DVD and Blu-ray of Million Dollar Mermaid. • Tom and Jerry: Fur Flying Adventures: Volume 1 DVD. • Tom and Jerry Spotlight Collection: Volume 2 DVD. • Tom and Jerry: The Classic Collection: Volume 2 DVD.
January 14, 1950	Tom and Jerry	Saturday Evening Puss	William Hanna & Joseph Barbera	206		• Tom and Jerry and Friends: Volume 2 DVD. • Tom and Jerry: Fur Flying Adventures: Volume 1 DVD. • Tom and Jerry Spotlight Collection: Volume 2 DVD. • Tom and Jerry: The Classic Collection: Volume 2 DVD.
March 11, 1950	Tom and Jerry	Texas Tom	William Hanna & Joseph Barbera	210		• Extra on the Blu-ray of Westward the Women. • Tom and Jerry Spotlight Collection: Volume 1 DVD. • Tom and Jerry Spotlight Collection: Volume 2 DVD. • Tom and Jerry: The Classic Collection: Volume 2 DVD.
April 22, 1950	Tom and Jerry	Jerry and the Lion	William Hanna & Joseph Barbera	201		• Tom and Jerry: Mouse Trouble DVD. • Tom and Jerry Spotlight Collection: Volume 1 DVD. • Tom and Jerry: The Classic Collection: Volume 2 DVD.
May 27, 1950	—N/a	Ventriloquist Cat	Tex Avery	208	• Featuring Blackie the Cat and Butch.	• Tex Avery Screwball Classics: Volume 2 DVD and Blu-ray. • Extra on the DVD of Three Little Words.
June 10, 1950	—N/a	The Cuckoo Clock	Tex Avery	174	• Last appearance of Blackie the Cat	• Tex Avery Screwball Classics: Volume 2 DVD and Blu-ray. • Extra on the DVD and Blu-ray of Summer Stock.
July 1, 1950	Tom and Jerry	Safety Second	William Hanna & Joseph Barbera	212		• Tom and Jerry Spotlight Collection: Volume 2 DVD. • Tom and Jerry: The Classic Collection: Volume 2 DVD.
September 16, 1950	Tom and Jerry	The Hollywood Bowl	William Hanna & Joseph Barbera	224		• Tom and Jerry and Friends: Volume 2 DVD. • Tom and Jerry: Fur Flying Adventures: Volume 1 DVD. • Tom and Jerry Spotlight Collection: Volume 1 DVD. • Tom and Jerry: The Classic Collection: Volume 3 DVD.
September 30, 1950	—N/a	Garden Gopher	Tex Avery	211	• Featuring Butch.	• Tex Avery Screwball Classics: Volume 1 DVD and Blu-ray. • Extra on the DVD of Two Weeks with Love.
October 21, 1950	Tom and Jerry	The Framed Cat	William Hanna & Joseph Barbera	214		• Tom and Jerry Spotlight Collection: Volume 3 DVD. • Tom and Jerry: The Classic Collection: Volume 3 DVD.
November 4, 1950	Droopy	The Chump Champ	Tex Avery	213		• Tex Avery Screwball Classics: Volume 1 DVD and Blu-ray. • Tex Avery's Droopy: The Complete Theatrical Collection DVD • Extra on the DVD of Pagan Love Song.
November 25, 1950	Tom and Jerry	Cue Ball Cat	William Hanna & Joseph Barbera	215		• Tom and Jerry Spotlight Collection: Volume 1 DVD. • Tom and Jerry: The Classic Collection: Volume 3 DVD.
December 9, 1950	—N/a	The Peachy Cobbler	Tex Avery	217		• Tex Avery Screwball Classics: Volume 1 DVD and Blu-ray. • Extra on the DVD of Nancy Goes to Rio.
January 6, 1951	Tom and Jerry	Casanova Cat	William Hanna & Joseph Barbera	216		• Tom and Jerry: The Classic Collection: Volume 3 DVD.
February 10, 1951	—N/a	Cock-a-Doodle Dog	Tex Avery	218	• Featuring Butch	• Tex Avery Screwball Classics: Volume 3 DVD and Blu-ray.
March 3, 1951	Tom and Jerry	Jerry and the Goldfish	William Hanna & Joseph Barbera	219		• Extra on the Blu-ray of Father's Little Dividend. • Tom and Jerry Spotlight Collection: Volume 1 DVD. • Tom and Jerry: The Classic Collection: Volume 3 DVD.
March 31, 1951	Droopy	Daredevil Droopy	Tex Avery	221		• Tex Avery Screwball Classics: Volume 1 DVD and Blu-ray. • Tex Avery's Droopy: The Complete Theatrical Collection DVD
April 7, 1951	Tom and Jerry	Jerry's Cousin	William Hanna & Joseph Barbera	220		• Warner Bros. Home Entertainment Academy Award-Nominated Animation: Golden Gems DVD. • Tom and Jerry: Tricks & Treats DVD. • Warner Bros. Home Entertainment Academy Awards Animation Collection DVD. • Tom and Jerry Spotlight Collection: Volume 1 DVD. • Tom and Jerry: The Classic Collection: Volume 3 DVD.
May 5, 1951	Droopy	Droopy's Good Deed	Tex Avery	222		• Tex Avery's Droopy: The Complete Theatrical Collection DVD
May 26, 1951	Tom and Jerry	Sleepy-Time Tom	William Hanna & Joseph Barbera	223		• Tom and Jerry Spotlight Collection: Volume 2 DVD. • Tom and Jerry: The Classic Collection: Volume 3 DVD.
June 16, 1951	—N/a	Symphony in Slang	Tex Avery	226		• Tex Avery Screwball Classics: Volume 1 DVD and Blu-ray. • Extra on the Blu-ray of Looney Tunes Platinum Collection: Volume 2.
July 7, 1951	Tom and Jerry	His Mouse Friday	William Hanna & Joseph Barbera	227		• Tom and Jerry Spotlight Collection: Volume 3 DVD. • Tom and Jerry: The Classic Collection: Volume 3 DVD.
September 8, 1951	Tom and Jerry	Slicked-up Pup	William Hanna & Joseph Barbera	232		• Tom and Jerry Spotlight Collection: Volume 1 DVD. • Tom and Jerry: The Classic Collection: Volume 3 DVD.
September 22, 1951	—N/a	Car of Tomorrow	Tex Avery	236		• Tex Avery Screwball Classics: Volume 2 DVD and Blu-ray. • Extra on the DVD of Royal Wedding.
October 6, 1951	Tom and Jerry	Nit-Witty Kitty	William Hanna & Joseph Barbera	231		• Tom and Jerry Spotlight Collection: Volume 2 DVD. • Tom and Jerry: The Classic Collection: Volume 3 DVD.
November 17, 1951	Droopy	Droopy's Double Trouble	Tex Avery	230		• Tex Avery Screwball Classics: Volume 2 DVD and Blu-ray. • Tex Avery's Droopy: The Complete Theatrical Collection DVD • Extra on the DVD of Royal Wedding.
December 8, 1951	Tom and Jerry	Cat Napping	William Hanna & Joseph Barbera	229		
January 12, 1952	Tom and Jerry	The Flying Cat	William Hanna & Joseph Barbera	233		
February 9, 1952	—N/a	Magical Maestro	Tex Avery	228	• Featuring Butch.	• Tex Avery Screwball Classics: Volume 2 DVD and Blu-ray. • Extra on the Blu-ray of Looney Tunes Platinum Collection: Volume 2. • Extra on the DVD of The Belle of New York.
February 16, 1952	Tom and Jerry	The Duck Doctor	William Hanna & Joseph Barbera	235		• Extra on the Blu-ray of Westward the Women.
March 15, 1952	Tom and Jerry	The Two Mouseketeers	William Hanna & Joseph Barbera	247		• Extra on the DVD and Blu-ray of Ivanhoe.
April 12, 1952	Tom and Jerry	Smitten Kitten	William Hanna & Joseph Barbera	240		
April 19, 1952	Tom and Jerry	Triplet Trouble	William Hanna & Joseph Barbera	238		
May 15, 1952	—N/a	One Cab's Family	Tex Avery	234		• Tex Avery Screwball Classics: Volume 2 DVD and Blu-ray.
June 14, 1952	Tom and Jerry	Little Runaway	William Hanna & Joseph Barbera	242		
July 12, 1952	—N/a	Rock-a-Bye Bear	Tex Avery	239	• Featuring Butch • Final cartoon directed by Avery before a year-long sabbatical.	• Tex Avery Screwball Classics: Volume 3 DVD and Blu-ray. • Extra on the Blu-ray of Looney Tunes Platinum Collection: Volume Two.
July 26, 1952	Tom and Jerry	Fit to Be Tied	William Hanna & Joseph Barbera	243		
September 6, 1952	Tom and Jerry	Push-Button Kitty	William Hanna & Joseph Barbera	244		
September 27, 1952	Droopy	Caballero Droopy	Dick Lundy	246	• First released MGM cartoon directed by Dick Lundy.	• Tex Avery's Droopy: The Complete Theatrical Collection DVD
October 18, 1952	Tom and Jerry	Cruise Cat	William Hanna & Joseph Barbera	252		
November 8, 1952	Barney Bear	The Little Wise Quacker	Dick Lundy	245	• First MGM cartoon directed by Dick Lundy.	
November 29, 1952	Tom and Jerry	The Dog House	William Hanna & Joseph Barbera	250		
December 20, 1952	Barney Bear	Busybody Bear	Dick Lundy	251		
January 10, 1953	Tom and Jerry	The Missing Mouse	William Hanna & Joseph Barbera	254	• Edward Plumb was the composer for this cartoon.	
January 31, 1953	Barney Bear	Barney's Hungry Cousin	Dick Lundy	253		• Extra on the Blu-ray of Kiss Me Kate.
February 21, 1953	Tom and Jerry	Jerry and Jumbo	William Hanna & Joseph Barbera	256		• Extra on the DVD and Blu-ray of Billy Rose's Jumbo.
March 14, 1953	Barney Bear	Cobs and Robbers	Dick Lundy	248		• Extra on the DVD of Easy to Love.
March 21, 1953	Tom and Jerry	Johann Mouse	William Hanna & Joseph Barbera	266		• Extra on the DVD of The Prisoner of Zenda.
April 18, 1953	—N/a	Little Johnny Jet	Tex Avery	267	• First cartoon directed by Tex Avery after return from sabbatical.	• Tex Avery Screwball Classics: Volume 3 DVD and Blu-ray. • Warner Bros. Home Entertainment Academy Award-Nominated Animation: Golden Gems DVD. • Warner Bros. Home Entertainment Academy Awards Animation Collection DVD. • Extra on the DVD and Blu-ray of The Naked Spur.
April 25, 1953	Tom and Jerry	That's My Pup!	William Hanna & Joseph Barbera	260		
May 30, 1953	Barney Bear	Heir Bear	Dick Lundy	249		
June 6, 1953	—N/a	T.V. of Tomorrow	Tex Avery	274		• Tex Avery Screwball Classics: Volume 2 DVD and Blu-ray. • Extra on the DVD of Torch Song.
June 20, 1953	Barney Bear	Wee-Willie Wildcat	Dick Lundy	255		
September 5, 1953	Tom and Jerry	Just Ducky	William Hanna & Joseph Barbera	258		• Extra on the Blu-ray of Father's Little Dividend.
September 26, 1953	Barney Bear	Half-Pint Palomino	Dick Lundy	257	• Second and final appearance of Benny Burro.	
October 17, 1953	Tom and Jerry	Two Little Indians	William Hanna & Joseph Barbera	262		
November 21, 1953	Tom and Jerry	Life with Tom	William Hanna & Joseph Barbera	264	• Uses footage from Cat Fishin', The Little Orphan, and Kitty Foiled.	
December 26, 1953	Droopy	The Three Little Pups	Tex Avery	269	• First appearance of Tex Avery's southern wolf.	• Tex Avery Screwball Classics: Volume 2 DVD and Blu-ray. • Tex Avery's Droopy: The Complete Theatrical Collection DVD • Extra on the Blu-ray of The Band Wagon.
January 23, 1954	Tom and Jerry	Puppy Tale	William Hanna & Joseph Barbera	275		
January 30, 1954	Tom and Jerry	Posse Cat	William Hanna & Joseph Barbera	268		
February 20, 1954	Droopy	Drag-a-Long Droopy	Tex Avery	271		• Tex Avery Screwball Classics: Volume 2 DVD and Blu-ray. • Tex Avery's Droopy: The Complete Theatrical Collection DVD
March 20, 1954	Barney Bear	The Impossible Possum	Dick Lundy	259		
April 17, 1954	Tom and Jerry	Hic-cup Pup	William Hanna & Joseph Barbera	270		
May 8, 1954	—N/a	Billy Boy	Tex Avery	272		• Tex Avery Screwball Classics: Volume 3 DVD and Blu-ray. • Extra on the DVD of Executive Suite.
May 29, 1954	Tom and Jerry	Little School Mouse	William Hanna & Joseph Barbera	273		
June 19, 1954	Barney Bear	Sleepy-Time Squirrel	Dick Lundy	263		
July 10, 1954	Droopy	Homesteader Droopy	Tex Avery	276		• Tex Avery Screwball Classics: Volume 2 DVD and Blu-ray. • Tex Avery's Droopy: The Complete Theatrical Collection DVD
July 30, 1954	Barney Bear	Bird-Brain Bird Dog	Dick Lundy	265	• Last Barney Bear cartoon. • Last MGM cartoon directed by Dick Lundy.	
August 14, 1954	Tom and Jerry	Baby Butch	William Hanna & Joseph Barbera	277		
September 4, 1954	Tom and Jerry	Mice Follies	William Hanna & Joseph Barbera	279		
September 18, 1954	—N/a	The Farm of Tomorrow	Tex Avery	278		• Tex Avery Screwball Classics: Volume 2 DVD and Blu-ray. • Extra on the DVD and Blu-ray of Deep in My Heart.
October 2, 1954	Tom and Jerry	Neapolitan Mouse	William Hanna & Joseph Barbera	281		
November 6, 1954	—N/a	The Flea Circus	Tex Avery	280		• Tex Avery Screwball Classics: Volume 2 DVD and Blu-ray. • Extra on the DVD and Blu-ray of Les Girls.
November 13, 1954	Tom and Jerry	Downhearted Duckling	William Hanna & Joseph Barbera	283		
November 20, 1954	Tom and Jerry	Pet Peeve	William Hanna & Joseph Barbera	296	• First MGM cartoon filmed in CinemaScope to be released • An Academy ratio version was also released. • First appearances of George and Joan.	
December 4, 1954	Droopy	Dixieland Droopy	Tex Avery	282		• Tex Avery Screwball Classics: Volume 2 DVD and Blu-ray. • Extra on the DVD and Blu-ray of The Long, Long Trailer. • Tex Avery's Droopy: The Complete Theatrical Collection DVD.
December 18, 1954	Tom and Jerry	Touché, Pussy Cat!	William Hanna & Joseph Barbera	294	• Filmed in both CinemaScope and Academy ratio formats.	• Extra on the Blu-ray of The Last Time I Saw Paris.
March 12, 1955	Tom and Jerry	Southbound Duckling	William Hanna & Joseph Barbera	298	• Filmed in both CinemaScope and Academy ratio formats.	
April 30, 1955	—N/a	Field and Scream	Tex Avery	284		• Tex Avery Screwball Classics: Volume 2 DVD and Blu-ray. • Extra on the DVD of Hit the Deck.
April 30, 1955	Tom and Jerry	Pup on a Picnic	William Hanna & Joseph Barbera	285	• Filmed in both CinemaScope and Academy ratio formats.	
May 21, 1955	Tom and Jerry	Mouse for Sale	William Hanna & Joseph Barbera	287		
September 2, 1955	Tom and Jerry	Designs on Jerry	William Hanna & Joseph Barbera	292	• First MGM cartoon released on a Friday.	
September 9, 1955	Tom and Jerry	Tom and Chérie	William Hanna & Joseph Barbera	299	• Filmed in CinemaScope.	
September 30, 1955	—N/a	The First Bad Man	Tex Avery	286		• Tex Avery Screwball Classics: Volume 2 DVD and Blu-ray. • Extra on the DVD and Blu-ray of Kismet. • Extra on the Blu-ray of Wichita.
October 14, 1955	Tom and Jerry	Smarty Cat	William Hanna & Joseph Barbera	297	• Uses footage from Solid Serenade, Cat Fishin', and Fit to Be Tied.	
October 28, 1955	Droopy	Deputy Droopy	Tex Avery & Michael Lah	288		• Tex Avery Screwball Classics: Volume 3 DVD and Blu-ray. • Extra on the DVD and Blu-ray of It's Always Fair Weather. • Extra on the Blu-ray of Wichita. • Tex Avery's Droopy: The Complete Theatrical Collection DVD.
November 11, 1955	Tom and Jerry	Pecos Pest	William Hanna & Joseph Barbera	289		
November 19, 1955	Tom and Jerry	That's My Mommy	William Hanna & Joseph Barbera	300	• First cartoon produced by William Hanna and Joseph Barbera in CinemaScope. • The first MGM cartoon released solely in CinemaScope format.	
November 25, 1955	—N/a	Cellbound	Tex Avery & Michael Lah	291	• Featuring Butch • Final MGM cartoon directed by Tex Avery. • Final MGM cartoon released in Academy ratio.	• Tex Avery Screwball Classics: Volume 3 DVD and Blu-ray.
December 23, 1955	—N/a	Good Will to Men	William Hanna & Joseph Barbera	302	• Remake of Peace on Earth. • Last MGM cartoon produced by Fred Quimby; also the only one he produced alongside William Hanna and Joseph Barbera.	• Extra on the DVD and Blu-ray of It's Always Fair Weather.• Warner Bros. Home Entertainment Academy Award-Nominated Animation: Golden Gems DVD. • Warner Bros. Home Entertainment Academy Awards Animation Collection DVD.
January 27, 1956	Tom and Jerry	The Flying Sorceress	William Hanna & Joseph Barbera	301	• Produced by William Hanna and Joseph Barbera.	• Extra on the DVD of Tom and Jerry: The Magic Ring.
March 23, 1956	Tom and Jerry	The Egg and Jerry	William Hanna & Joseph Barbera	314	• CinemaScope remake of Hatch Up Your Troubles.	
May 4, 1956	Tom and Jerry	Busy Buddies	William Hanna & Joseph Barbera	303	• Produced by William Hanna and Joseph Barbera.	
September 7, 1956	Tom and Jerry	Muscle Beach Tom	William Hanna & Joseph Barbera	304		
September 21, 1956	Droopy	Millionaire Droopy	William Hanna & Joseph Barbera (uncredited)	315	• CinemaScope remake of Wags to Riches.	• Tex Avery's Droopy: The Complete Theatrical Collection DVD • Extra on the DVD of High Society.
October 21, 1956	Tom and Jerry	Down Beat Bear	William Hanna & Joseph Barbera	305		• Extra on the Blu-ray of The Fastest Gun Alive.
November 16, 1956	Tom and Jerry	Blue Cat Blues	William Hanna & Joseph Barbera	306		• Extra on the Blu-ray of The Fastest Gun Alive.
December 14, 1956	Tom and Jerry	Barbecue Brawl	William Hanna & Joseph Barbera	307		
January 25, 1957	—N/a	Cat's Meow	William Hanna & Joseph Barbera (uncredited)	323	• Last Butch solo cartoon. • CinemaScope remake of Ventriloquist Cat.	
February 22, 1957	Tom and Jerry	Tops with Pops	William Hanna & Joseph Barbera	318	• CinemaScope remake of Love That Pup.	
March 29, 1957	Spike and Tyke	Give and Tyke	William Hanna & Joseph Barbera	313	• Spin-off of Tom and Jerry, one of two made.	
April 19, 1957	Tom and Jerry	Timid Tabby	William Hanna & Joseph Barbera	308		
May 17, 1957	Droopy	Grin and Share It	Michael Lah	312		• Tex Avery's Droopy: The Complete Theatrical Collection DVD.
June 7, 1957	Tom and Jerry	Feedin' the Kiddie	William Hanna & Joseph Barbera	321	• CinemaScope remake of The Little Orphan.	
July 26, 1957	Spike and Tyke	Scat Cats	William Hanna & Joseph Barbera	319	• Last Spike and Tyke cartoon.	
September 6, 1957	Tom and Jerry	Mucho Mouse	William Hanna & Joseph Barbera	310	• Final appearance of Lightning Cat.	
October 4, 1957	Droopy	Blackboard Jumble	Michael Lah	316		• Tex Avery's Droopy: The Complete Theatrical Collection DVD. • Extra on the DVD of Blackboard Jungle.
November 1, 1957	Tom and Jerry	Tom's Photo Finish	William Hanna & Joseph Barbera	311		
December 6, 1957	Droopy	One Droopy Knight	Michael Lah	320	• Quasi-remake of Señor Droopy.	• Warner Bros. Home Entertainment Academy Award-Nominated Animation: Golden Gems DVD. • Warner Bros. Home Entertainment Academy Awards Animation Collection DVD. • Tex Avery's Droopy: The Complete Theatrical Collection DVD.
January 3, 1958	Tom and Jerry	Happy Go Ducky	William Hanna & Joseph Barbera	309	• Red Coffey voices Little Quacker.	• Extra on the DVD of Easter Parade.
February 7, 1958	Droopy	Sheep Wrecked	Michael Lah	322		• Tex Avery's Droopy: The Complete Theatrical Collection DVD.
March 7, 1958	Tom and Jerry	Royal Cat Nap	William Hanna & Joseph Barbera	317		
April 4, 1958	Droopy	Mutts About Racing	Michael Lah	326		• Tex Avery's Droopy: The Complete Theatrical Collection DVD.
May 2, 1958	Tom and Jerry	The Vanishing Duck	William Hanna & Joseph Barbera	325		• Extra on the DVD of Gigi.
June 6, 1958	Tom and Jerry	Robin Hoodwinked	William Hanna & Joseph Barbera	329		
July 4, 1958	Droopy	Droopy Leprechaun	Michael Lah	333	• Last Droopy cartoon. • Final appearance of Butch. • Final cartoon completed at the studio.	• Tex Avery's Droopy: The Complete Theatrical Collection DVD.
August 1, 1958	Tom and Jerry	Tot Watchers	William Hanna & Joseph Barbera	330	• Final Tom and Jerry cartoon produced at the studio.	• Extra on the DVD of The Tunnel of Love.

== Rembrandt Films (1961–1962) ==
Release date	Series	Title	Series Director	Notes
September 7, 1961	Tom and Jerry	Switchin' Kitten	Gene Deitch	First MGM cartoon produced in Czechoslovakia by William L. Snyder's Rembrandt Films. First MGM cartoon with Leo the Lion.
October 26, 1961	Tom and Jerry	Down and Outing	Gene Deitch	
December 7, 1961	Tom and Jerry	It's Greek to Me-ow!	Gene Deitch	
March 23, 1962	Tom and Jerry	High Steaks	Gene Deitch	
April 13, 1962	Tom and Jerry	Mouse into Space	Gene Deitch	
May 18, 1962	Tom and Jerry	Landing Stripling	Gene Deitch	
June 22, 1962	Tom and Jerry	Calypso Cat	Gene Deitch	
July 20, 1962	Tom and Jerry	Dicky Moe	Gene Deitch	
August 10, 1962	Tom and Jerry	The Tom and Jerry Cartoon Kit	Gene Deitch	
September 14, 1962	Tom and Jerry	Tall in the Trap	Gene Deitch	
October 12, 1962	Tom and Jerry	Sorry Safari	Gene Deitch	
November 1, 1962	Tom and Jerry	Buddies Thicker Than Water	Gene Deitch	
December 21, 1962	Tom and Jerry	Carmen Get It!	Gene Deitch	Last MGM cartoon produced in Czechoslovakia by William L. Snyder's Rembrandt Films.

== MGM Animation/Visual Arts (1963–1967) ==
Release date	Series	Title	Director	Notes
July 27, 1963	Tom and Jerry	Pent-House Mouse	Chuck Jones	First MGM cartoon produced by Chuck Jones and Les Goldman's Sib Tower 12 studio. Extra on the Blu-ray of The Courtship of Eddie's Father.
February 25, 1964	Tom and Jerry	The Cat Above and the Mouse Below	Chuck Jones	
March 24, 1964	Tom and Jerry	Is There a Doctor in the Mouse?	Chuck Jones	
April 14, 1964	Tom and Jerry	Much Ado About Mousing	Chuck Jones	
May 12, 1964	Tom and Jerry	Snowbody Loves Me	Chuck Jones	
December 8, 1964	Tom and Jerry	The Unshrinkable Jerry Mouse	Chuck Jones	
January 20, 1965	Tom and Jerry	Ah, Sweet Mouse-Story of Life	Chuck Jones	
January 27, 1965	Tom and Jerry	Tom-ic Energy	Chuck Jones	
February 10, 1965	Tom and Jerry	Bad Day at Cat Rock	Chuck Jones	
March 3, 1965	Tom and Jerry	The Brothers Carry-Mouse-Off	Jim Pabian	
March 24, 1965	Tom and Jerry	Haunted Mouse	Chuck Jones	
April 7, 1965	Tom and Jerry	I'm Just Wild About Jerry	Chuck Jones	
May 19, 1965	Tom and Jerry	Of Feline Bondage	Chuck Jones	
June 9, 1965	Tom and Jerry	The Year of the Mouse	Chuck Jones	
December 22, 1965	Tom and Jerry	The Cat's Me-Ouch!	Chuck Jones	
December 31, 1965	—N/a	The Dot and the Line (⭐️)	Chuck Jones	Extra on the DVD and Blu-ray of The Glass Bottom Boat.
January 20, 1966	Tom and Jerry	Duel Personality	Chuck Jones	
February 17, 1966	Tom and Jerry	Jerry, Jerry, Quite Contrary	Chuck Jones	
April 7, 1966	Tom and Jerry	Jerry-Go-Round	Abe Levitow	First MGM cartoon directed by Abe Levitow.
April 28, 1966	Tom and Jerry	Love Me, Love My Mouse	Chuck Jones & Ben Washam	Last appearance of Toodles.
May 5, 1966	Tom and Jerry	Puss 'n' Boats	Abe Levitow	
June 30, 1966	Tom and Jerry	Filet Meow	Abe Levitow	Extra on the Blu-ray of Spinout.
July 14, 1966	Tom and Jerry	Matinee Mouse	Tom Ray	Uses footage from the Hanna and Barbera shorts Love That Pup, The Flying Cat, Professor Tom, The Missing Mouse, Jerry and the Lion, Jerry's Diary, The Flying Sorceress and The Truce Hurts. William Hanna and Joseph Barbera were credited as directors while Tom Ray was credited as the story director.
August 4, 1966	Tom and Jerry	The A-Tom-inable Snowman	Abe Levitow	
September 8, 1966	Tom and Jerry	Catty-Cornered	Abe Levitow	Last appearance of Lightning. Extra on the Blu-ray of Spinout.
January 20, 1967	Tom and Jerry	Cat and Dupli-cat	Chuck Jones	
February 27, 1967	Tom and Jerry	O-Solar Meow	Abe Levitow	
March 10, 1967	Tom and Jerry	Guided Mouse-ille	Abe Levitow	
April 7, 1967	Tom and Jerry	Rock 'n' Rodent	Abe Levitow	Last appearance of Spike. Extra on the Blu-ray of Double Trouble.
April 14, 1967	Tom and Jerry	Cannery Rodent	Chuck Jones	
April 21, 1967	Tom and Jerry	The Mouse from H.U.N.G.E.R.	Abe Levitow	Rarely airs on Cartoon Network and Boomerang because of the epileptic seizure-causing flickering shown in the beginning.
May 5, 1967	Tom and Jerry	Surf-Bored Cat	Abe Levitow	Final MGM cartoon directed by Abe Levitow. Extra on the Blu-ray of Double Trouble.
June 23, 1967	Tom and Jerry	Shutter Bugged Cat	Tom Ray	Uses footage from the Hanna and Barbera shorts Part Time Pal, Nit-Witty Kitty, Johann Mouse, The Yankee Doodle Mouse, Heavenly Puss and Designs on Jerry. William Hanna & Joseph Barbera were credited as directors while Tom Ray as story director.
August 25, 1967	Tom and Jerry	Advance and Be Mechanized	Ben Washam	
September 8, 1967	Tom and Jerry	Purr-Chance to Dream	Ben Washam	Last Tom and Jerry cartoon made by MGM.
December 31, 1967	—N/a	The Bear That Wasn't	Chuck Jones	Last one-shot cartoon. Last cartoon produced by MGM Animation/Visual Arts. Last cartoon distributed by MGM. Last time that Tanner the Lion was used in a MGM logo.

== Bibliography ==
- Iwerks, Leslie and Kenworthy, John. (2001): The Hand Behind the Mouse. Disney Editions.
- Maltin, Leonard (1987): Of Mice and Magic: A History of American Animated Cartoons. Penguin Books.
- Lenburg, Jeff (1993): The Great Cartoon Directors. Da Capo Press.
- Moritz, William (2004): Optical Poetry: The Life and Work of Oskar Fischinger. John Libbey Publishing.
