= Jack Zander =

American animator (1908–2007)

- Born: Arthur Jack Zander; May 3, 1908; Kalamazoo, Michigan, United States
- Died: December 17, 2007 (aged 99); Pound Ridge, New York, United States
- Occupation: Animator
- Years active: 1930–1984

Arthur Jack Zander (May 3, 1908 – December 17, 2007) was an American animator whose career lasted from the "golden age" of theatrical animation into the 1980s.

== Biography ==
Jack Zander was born on May 3, 1908, in Kalamazoo, Michigan as Arthur Jack Zander. His first job in animation was for Romer Grey in 1930, before he left for Harman-Ising Productions where he worked on the Looney Tunes and Merrie Melodies series. After Harman-Ising left both series, he joined The Van Beuren Corporation followed by Terrytoons in 1936.

He joined the Metro-Goldwyn-Mayer cartoon department in 1937, and worked on MGM cartoons based on comic strips, including The Captain and the Kids and Count Screwloose. After Hugh Harman and Rudolf Ising rejoined the studio, he worked on cartoons including The Little Goldfish (1939), Goldilocks and the Three Bears (1939), The Mad Maestro (1939) and the Barney Bear series. By the early 1940s, Zander became a regular animator in William Hanna and Joseph Barbera's then newly-formed unit and contributed animation to shorts such as War Dogs (1943) and the early Tom & Jerry entries Puss Gets the Boot (1940), The Midnight Snack (1941), The Night Before Christmas (1941), Fraidy Cat (1942), Fine Feathered Friend (1942) and Sufferin' Cats! (1943). He left MGM in 1942.

After World War II, Zander begin working in industrial films and advertising. In 1954, Zander was a founder of Pelican Films. In 1966, Pelican acquired Lars Calonius Productions, whose clients included Kent cigarettes, General Foods, and Gulf Oil. In 1970, he left Pelican and formed Zander's Animation Parlour in New York City where he made commercials for AT&T, the U.S. Postal Service, Kraft Foods, Arm & Hammer, Pepsi, Visine, and more until his retirement. In 1984, he created "Tippi Turtle", an obnoxious character who enjoyed playing practical jokes, in three animated shorts for Saturday Night Live.

== Awards ==
Zander was nominated for an Outstanding Animated Program Emmy in 1981 for Gnomes, and in 1984 he won the Motion Picture Screen Cartoonists' Golden Award.

== Death ==
Zander died at his home in New York on December 17, 2007.
