= Blue Danube =

Blue Danube may refer to:

- "The Blue Danube", a waltz composed by Johann Strauss II
- The Blue Danube (1926 film), a German silent film directed by Frederic Zelnik
- The Blue Danube (1928 film), an American silent film starring Leatrice Joy
- The Blue Danube (1932 film), a British film
- The Blue Danube (1939 film). an American cartoon film by Hugh Harman
- The Blue Danube (1940 film), an American drama film
- The Blue Danube (1955 film), an Austrian film
- Blue Danube (nuclear weapon), the first British operational nuclear weapon
- Blue Danube (band), an Austrian band who represented their country in the 1980 Eurovision Song Contest
- Blue Danube Radio, an English-language radio station in Vienna
- Blue Danube, or Blue Onion, a porcelain pattern
- Blue Danube (album)
- Blue Danube, a colloquial Soviet term for the drink made from the 70% alcohol rocket fuel used in the V-2, and tinted with manganese crystals
