= John A. McManus =

American film editor

John Armstrong McManus (1913–1971) was an American film editor who developed the television series Crusade in Europe, based on the book of Dwight D. Eisenhower.

== Biography ==
McManus was born in Greenwich, Connecticut. He began his career as a film editor for The March of Time in 1934. In 1940, he worked on propaganda films for Nelson A. Rockefeller, the Coordinator of Inter-American Affairs.

During World War II, McManus served in the U.S. Army as a supervising editor in Frank Capra's psychological cinema unit, contributing to the Why We Fight series. He also served as the supervising editor for the Army–Navy Screen Magazine. After the war, he joined Louis de Rochemont Associates and worked on films including The House on 92nd Street. Later, for 20th Century Fox, he originated Crusade in Europe and other television programs.

In 1955, McManus supervised The Man I Never Saw, a fundraising film for Athens College directed by Spyros Skouras, which received a Golden Reel Award. He later worked as an associate of David Lowe and others, editing television programs for the Columbia Broadcasting System.
