= Uncle Tom's Bungalow =

1937 film by Fred Avery

- Title card
- Directed by: Fred Avery
- Produced by: Leon Schlesinger
- Starring: Billy Bletcher; Bernice Hansen; Elvia Allman; Mel Blanc; Roy Glenn
- Narrated by: Tedd Pierce
- Music by: Carl W. Stalling
- Animation by: Sid Sutherland; Virgil Ross
- Color process: Technicolor
- Production company: Leon Schlesinger Productions
- Distributed by: Warner Bros. Productions; The Vitaphone Corporation
- Release date: June 5, 1937
- Running time: 8 minutes
- Country: United States
- Language: English

Uncle Tom's Bungalow is a 1937 American animated comedy short film directed by Fred Avery. It was released on June 5, 1937. It is the 75th film in the Merrie Melodies series. The short cartoon is a parody of the 1852 novel Uncle Tom's Cabin and of the "plantation melodrama" genre of the 1930s.

Because of the racial stereotypes of black people throughout the short, it is withheld from circulation, one of the "Censored Eleven" shorts. However, brief segments appeared in Turner Entertainment's 1989 home video release, Cartoons For Big Kids, hosted by Leonard Maltin. It was exhibited once, along with other films as part of "The Censored Eleven", at the TCM Film Festival in Hollywood on April 24, 2010, as part of a classic film series presented by Donald Bogle.

== Plot ==
Eva, a young white girl, lives with her black friend Topsy and mammy caretaker Eliza. Nearly half of the film is used to introduce the characters, alongside used slave trader Simon Simon Legree, Uncle Tom and the dogs.

Simon sells Uncle Tom to the two girls on layaway, after they spot him whipping Uncle Tom for claiming to be owned by Warner Bros. In winter, Simon finds that the girls have missed their last three payments and sets out to get his money or take Uncle Tom back. While the girls and Uncle Tom clean a room, they hide Uncle Tom upon learning of Simon's arrival. Simon is electrocuted while trying to find Uncle Tom, but survives and chases the two girls with a whip, horrifying them to the point they temporarily exchange skin color. Eliza protects them and carries them away while Simon and his dogs give chase. Eliza finds that the river has not frozen over, but a nearby slot machine rewards them ice which they use to get across. Simon and his dogs corner them when Uncle Tom arrives in a limousine and repays Simon his due, which he earned playing craps cheating with loaded dice.

== Reception ==
On June 1, 1937, Selected Motion Pictures called the film "an interesting travesty in Technicolor of the well-known story." The National Board of Review of Motion Pictures called it "highly amusing."

== See also ==
- Uncle Tom's Cabaña, 1947 MGM animated short also directed by Tex Avery
- Mickey's Mellerdrammer, 1933 Disney animated short
- List of films featuring slavery
