= Home on the Range (disambiguation) =

"Home on the Range" is an American folk song.

Home on the Range may also refer to:

- Home on the Range (1935 film), a drama directed by Arthur Jacobson
- Home on the Range (1940 film), a 1940 animated short film by Rudolf Ising
- Home on the Range (1946 film), a drama directed by Robert Springsteen
- Home on the Range (2004 film), a Disney animated feature film
- A Home on the Range, a 2002 American documentary film about Jewish chicken ranchers
- Home on the Range, a 1981 documentary about alleged CIA involvement in the Australian governor's dismissal in 1975
- Home on the Range (album), 1977 album by Slim Whitman
- Home On The Range, a 2013 album with Wilford Brimley and Riders in the Sky
