= Uncle Tom's Cabaña =

Uncle Tom's Cabana
- Theatrical poster
- Directed by: Tex Avery
- Story by: Heck Allen
- Produced by: Fred Quimby
- Starring: Will Wright; Sara Berner; Imogene Lynn
- Music by: Scott Bradley
- Animation by: Walter Clinton; Ray Abrams; Preston Blair; Robert Bentley; Ed Love (uncredited)
- Layouts by: Walter Clinton (uncredited)
- Backgrounds by: John Didrik Johnsen (uncredited)
- Color process: Technicolor
- Production company: MGM cartoon studio
- Distributed by: Metro-Goldwyn-Mayer
- Release date: July 19, 1947
- Running time: 8 minutes
- Country: United States
- Language: English

Uncle Tom's Cabaña (also stylized Uncle Tom's Cabana) is a 1947 American animated short film directed by Tex Avery. The short is a parody of Harriet Beecher Stowe's 1852 novel Uncle Tom's Cabin, and is Avery's second parody of the novel, the first being Uncle Tom's Bungalow in 1937 while at Warner Bros. Cartoons.

The cartoon was well-received by the film press in 1947, but was fiercely criticized by an African-American weekly newspaper on its re-release in 1954, which, seven years after the cartoon's first release, accused the film of inflaming racial misunderstanding. The short was later banned from television airings.

== Plot ==
Uncle Tom decides to tell the kids the "real" story of Uncle Tom's Cabin.

Simon Legree owns the whole town except for the cabin of Uncle Tom. In a forceful move, Legree threatens Uncle Tom that he will take the property if Uncle Tom does not get the mortgage money by midnight. Uncle Tom calls up his friend, Little Eva, for help. As the two ponder on what to do, Uncle Tom begins playing the piano and Little Eva begins dancing. Suddenly, they decide to open a cabaña. The idea is a success. But Legree responds by tying Uncle Tom to a barrel of TNT and stealing the cash register. But he gets distracted by Little Eva's singing and beauty. He kidnaps her only to be greeted by Uncle Tom, at the door, with a hammer.

The Little Boy questions how Uncle Tom escaped the TNT barrel. Uncle Tom explains that he sweated so much that the water doused the fuse. Legree tries to take Uncle Tom out with a machine gun. The Little Boy asks why Uncle Tom wasn't killed. Uncle Tom explains that he had on his "Super-Duper Man Suit".

Uncle Tom's story begins to get more and more ridiculous. To the point where the kids no longer believe him. Uncle Tom responds by saying that if none of his story is true, then he calls for lightning to strike him dead. Lightning strikes Uncle Tom and his spirit floats up into the clouds, leaving the kids behind. The Little Boy responds, "We lose more Uncle Toms that way."

== Voice Cast ==
- Will Wright as Uncle Tom
- Sara Berner as the Little Boy
- Imogene Lynn as Red singing Carry Me Back to Old Virginny

== Reception ==
Upon its original release, The Film Daily wrote "A modern version of the old tale, it is a real seller." Motion Picture Herald described it as "a modern version with the emphasis on swing," and Motion Picture Exhibitor said, "This will appeal, especially to kids."

During the cartoon's 1954 re-issue, the African-American weekly Pittsburgh Courier published an editorial titled "Uncle Tom's Cabana Outrages Negro Audiences: What Price Brotherhood If Movies Play Up Handkerchief Heads?" The editorial called the cartoon "a base stereotype and an insult to Negroes", saying, "Even though there has been a general loosening of the Production Code in order to hype the box office, there is no reason why Negroes should continue to be ridiculed and jeered at in motion pictures. This medium reaches all levels of mentalities and feeds the flames of prejudice by projecting such canards as Uncle Tom's Cabana... Showing this insult during Brotherhood Week was a kick in the teeth to a fine effort to wipe out prejudice in America. With the world in ferment, Uncle Tom's Cabana set the movies back ten years."

In his 1996 book Tex Avery: The MGM Years, John Canemaker criticized the short saying: "In Uncle Tom’s Cabana a black man is the title character, but he is designed in a particularly gross caricature of an African-American with thick lips taking up the lower half of his face. Uncle Tom is amiable and slow, not too bright, poor, elderly (and therefore sexless). Remus-like, he is a dreamer and a fabricator of tall tales for children. (Disney’s feature Song of the South was released the year before)." He also criticizes the ending by saying: "That a black man could best a white one... was a conclusion that would not be allowed to stand. In the final scene, Tom is killed by lightning as a punishment for lying about his past, and his exit floating to heaven [is] less than dignified as his large bare ass leads the way."

== Censorship and Availability ==
Uncle Tom's Cabaña, along with Half-Pint Pygmy, are banned from television airings in the United States due to ethnic stereotyping of African-Americans.

Uncle Tom's Cabaña and Half-Pint Pygmy were on The Compleat Tex Avery LaserDisc boxset from MGM/UA Home Video in 1993, and will appear on the Tex Avery Definitive Screwball Classics Collection Blu-ray box set in 2026.

== See also ==
- Uncle Tom's Bungalow, a 1937 Warner Bros. short also directed by Tex Avery
- Mickey's Mellerdrammer, 1933 Disney animated short
