= The Goose Goes South =

- Directed by: William Hanna, Joseph Barbera (as "Supervised by")
- Produced by: Fred Quimby
- Music by: Scott Bradley (uncredited)
- Color process: Technicolor
- Distributed by: Metro-Goldwyn-Mayer
- Release date: 1941
- Running time: 7 min.
- Language: English

The Goose Goes South is an American animated short film directed by William Hanna and Joseph Barbera, being one of the first cartoons they made on their own. It is noted for its portrayal of African Americans. Produced by Fred Quimby, it was released by Metro-Goldwyn-Mayer on April 26, 1941.

== Story ==
An announcer explains the scene: Geese soar in huge flocks from their pond at the first sign of Winter; they all go south, but not all fly, this last point illustrated by a little white goose in hat, collar, and tie who stands by the side of a road in an attempt at hitchhiking. "No Riders", reads a sign left as if by magic on his thumb by a motorist speeding by; when the goose turns indignantly away, another motorist leaves one reading "Positively No Riders" on his tail. The driver of a red car stops for the bird's thumb, but only to mumble an incoherent (if apparently sincere) apology for his inability to take on a passenger.

So, the little goose will travel slowly, on foot. He comes to the Blue Ridge Mountains of Virginia, where, as the announcer narrates, a hillbilly father berates his "problem child", lazy Zeke, who, though a grown man with a beard, naps in a cradle. Elsewhere, but locally, a revenue agent smashes the still of a moonshiner with his "long arm", which he stretches at will all the way from a distant tree behind which he hides. We are shown Southern hospitality: the little bird luxuriates in a juicy slice of watermelon and is questioned on its merits by the old farmer who grew it; in friendliest tone, the farmer guesses that his guest cannot pay for the fruit, and, when the bird confirms this with a lusty nod, the old man chases him off with a shotgun!

And so the goose speeds through Kentucky, Tennessee, and Georgia (stopping only briefly in the second to tiptoe past a motorcycle-mounted officer and in the latter to whistle at an attractive young lady's likeness on a billboard!) A buxom songbird, "the Songbird of the South" as the narrator calls her, greets us from a branch with "Hello, anybody" and trills a pretty tune. The same driver from before stops again for the goose and makes the same mush-mouthed excuse before driving off.

Two courteous Southern gentlemen in white suits demur to one another, but in what? Why, in a spirited game of pinball, of course! Two African-American ladies converse over their cotton-picking duties: it seems one of them has five small children, all of whom want to grow up to be Rochester! And so we find the gaggle of tots all shouting into telephones in his trademark style.

The goose gets the attention of a motorist with a flirtatious false leg held out just so from behind a bush, but this only snags the same motorist in the same red car and his frustrating mumbled excuse. In nearby tobacco fields, we are introduced to the workers' incomprehensible jargon. In The Everglades, an innocent child sits carelessly playing in the maw of an alligator. The narrator attempts to save her: "It's an alligator," he protests; "It's a hollow tree!", she counters. The jaws snap shut, and the babe pushes them open only to remark with a smile, "I could be wrong, you know."

At last, the long journey ends, and the little goose sits down on a dock for a needed rest. A car pulls up—the same red car from before! "Well, well, if it isn't the little footloose goose!" remarks the driver with unusual clarity; he rambles in his way before speeding off the dock straight into the water! He gurgles for rescue, but the little goose excuses himself with the same sort of incomprehensible mumbling that has by now so often served to deny him succor!

== See also ==
- List of Metro-Goldwyn-Mayer cartoon studio films
