= The Homeless Flea =

1940 film by Rudolf Ising

- Title card
- Directed by: Rudolf Ising
- Produced by: Rudolf Ising; Fred Quimby (uncredited)
- Music by: Scott Bradley
- Color process: Technicolor
- Production company: Metro-Goldwyn-Mayer
- Distributed by: Loew's, Inc.
- Release date: October 12, 1940
- Running time: 7 min
- Country: United States
- Language: English

The Homeless Flea is a 1940 American animated short film directed by Rudolf Ising. It is notable for featuring a flea character which Tex Avery would use and name Homer Flea in What Price Fleadom (1948).

== Plot ==
A homeless flea finds his way to a house where a dog is sleeping. He finds his way to the dog's torso and begins hacking at one of the dog's hairs. The flea constructs a hammock and furniture on the dog. He sleeps while smoking a cigar and cooking a pot of food, which alerts the dog with smoke and causes him to itch. The dog quenches the flame with a goldfish bowl filled with water, but finds the flea to have washed his way into his face. The dog and flea wrestle control of the dog's body and fail to negotiate. The flea attempts to get on the dog while the dog unintentionally destroys furniture including a piano. The flea is driven out and gives up, preferring to hitchhike again.
