= A Tale of Two Cities (1946 film) =

1946 propaganda/documentary film about the atomic bombings of Hiroshima and Nagasaki

- Full film
- Production company: U.S. War Department
- Release date: 1946
- Running time: 12 Minutes
- Country: United States
- Language: English

A Tale of Two Cities is a 1946 propaganda/documentary film about the atomic bombings of Hiroshima and Nagasaki, produced by the Army-Navy Screen Magazine and numbered 76 on its catalog.

The film describes chronologically, and for the most part, dispassionately, the testing and the use of the atomic bombs impact on Hiroshima, describing where the bomb was actually dropped, and the damage done to military industrial targets, as well as noting which edifices sustained less damage, like those built with reinforced concrete. An interview is shown with a Jesuit priest, who describes his experience, and notes that he believes that approximately 100,000 people died.

Then the film moves on to Nagasaki, telling the audience that U.S. President Harry S. Truman warned the Japanese that he would use more nuclear weapons if they didn't surrender. The Nagasaki mission is described, showing the two plants that were the basic targets, and the valley that they planned to bomb, and then shows the mushroom cloud, "the funeral pyre of an aggressor nation".

At the end, the film takes a sober view of the future of atomic power, showing an "atomic shadow" of someone in the Hiroshima blast, saying that this could be someone of any race or creed, and that the future of atomic power could help mankind, or destroy it, depending on how people use it.

== See also ==
- List of Allied propaganda films of World War II
- Debate over the atomic bombings of Hiroshima and Nagasaki
