= The Bookworm (film) =

1939 film by Isadore Freleng

- Title card
- Directed by: Isadore Freleng (uncredited)
- Produced by: Hugh Harman; Fred Quimby (uncredited)
- Music by: Scott Bradley
- Color process: Technicolor
- Production company: Metro-Goldwyn-Mayer
- Distributed by: Loew's, Inc.
- Release date: August 19, 1939
- Running time: 8 min
- Country: United States
- Language: English

The Bookworm is a 1939 American animated short film directed by Isadore Freleng. It was the first cartoon to be directed by Freleng under Hugh Harman for Metro-Goldwyn-Mayer's cartoon department. It would be followed by a sequel, The Bookworm Turns, the same year, which was directed by Harman as Freleng left the studio before production started and after The Mad Maestro was completed.

== Plot ==
Book characters come to life as night arrives. The Three Witches from Macbeth conjure a potion until the Raven from The Raven reminds them that they need a worm. He is instructed to fetch them the worm, but not before he is distracted by a book named "Art Studies". He finds a depressed bookworm and chases him. He dresses up as a doll but does not fool the bookworm. He eventually corners the bookworm, who is chased by villainous book characters, but are met with Paul Revere who literally rides a Black Beauty (depicted as a stereotypical black woman) leading other book characters. The Raven attempts to throw the Bookworm into the Three Witches' cauldron, but is stopped by Boy Scouts who save the Bookworm by improvising a bridge with matches and burn the Raven on it. The Raven gives up and resists the temptation to continue the chase.
