= Johann Gregor Herold =

German painter and porcelain painter (1696–1775)

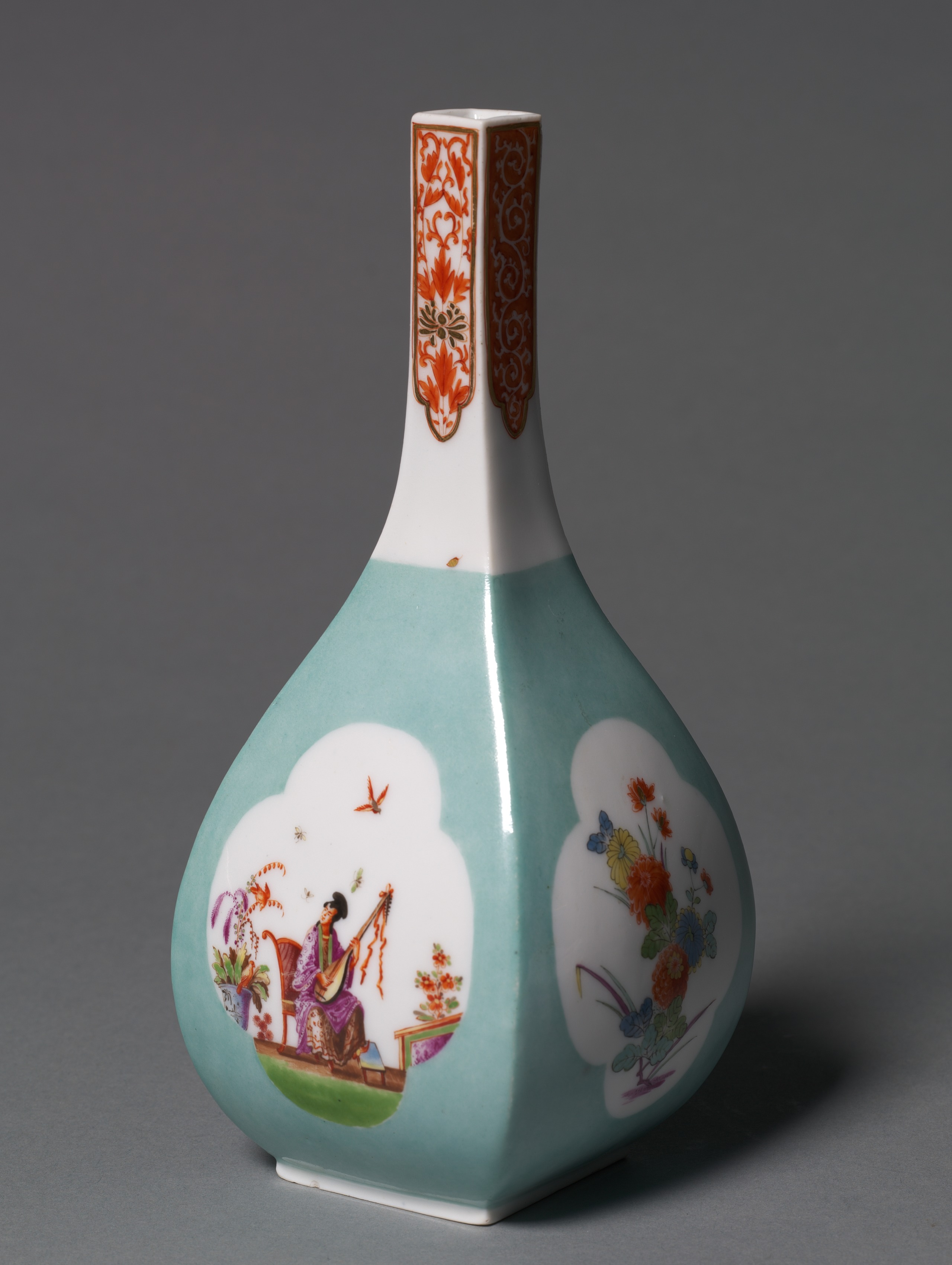
Meissen Sake bottle vase, painted by Herold, 1725

Johann Gregor Herold or Johann Gregorius Höroldt (6 August 1696, in Jena – 26 January 1775, in Meissen) was a German painter and porcelain painter. He was a key early figure in defining the styles of decoration for Meissen porcelain from 1723 onwards.

He was brought to Meissen in 1720 from the du Paquier Vienna porcelain factory, and in 1723 appointed court painter to Augustus the Strong, though evidently expected to spend most of his time designing and painting for porcelain. He created designs and painted some pieces himself, as guides for the larger team of painters at the factory. He specialized in chinoiserie designs, and much enlarged the palette of colours used at Meissen. Among Höroldt's most recognizable work is the Blue Onion pattern which he designed in 1739.
