= One Mother's Family =

1939 film by Rudolf Ising

- Title card
- Directed by: Rudolf Ising
- Produced by: Rudolf Ising; Fred Quimby (uncredited)
- Music by: Scott Bradley (uncredited)
- Color process: Technicolor
- Production company: Metro-Goldwyn-Mayer
- Distributed by: Loew's, Inc.
- Release date: September 30, 1939
- Running time: 8 min
- Country: United States
- Language: English

One Mother's Family is a 1939 American animated short film directed by Rudolf Ising. It is the oldest MGM cartoon directed by Ising to not be reissued and survive in its original titles.

== Plot ==
A hen takes her children, including a runt rooster chick, off for a walk. The chicks haplessly walk on a road and narrowly avoid running over. The runt falls into a pothole. The hen falls into a pond when she attempts to save the runt from falling in himself.

The hen tries to catch a worm, only to have her cover exposed by the runt and other chicks making noises. The chicks disguise as mushrooms to no avail. The runt hunts a grasshopper and swallows it unknowingly. The grasshopper's resistance causes him to jump uncontrollably and incidentally avoid a hawk. The runt and a skunk beat up the hawk, but end up overwhelming the hen with the skunk's smell.
