= Mrs. Ladybug =

1940 film by Rudolf Ising

- Title card
- Directed by: Rudolf Ising
- Produced by: Rudolf Ising; Fred Quimby (uncredited)
- Music by: Scott Bradley
- Color process: Technicolor
- Production company: Metro-Goldwyn-Mayer
- Distributed by: Loew's, Inc.
- Release date: December 21, 1940
- Running time: 7 min
- Country: United States
- Language: English

Mrs. Ladybug is a 1940 American animated short film directed by Rudolf Ising. It is one in numerous one-shot cartoons directed by Ising for Metro-Goldwyn-Mayer. Due to its depiction of racial stereotypes, it rarely airs on television.

== Plot ==
Three butterflies sing the story of Mrs. Ladybug, who takes care of her numerous children and is overwhelmed by the amount of work. After a particularly disobedient boy drenches drying clothes in dirty water by accident, she looks for a maid, attracting the attention of a spider. He dresses up as a mammy with the intention of eating the children. The boy realizes the mammy is a spider, but fails to stop him as he provides sham qualifications including an Oscar statue. The boy manipulates the spider's traps as he is continuously pummeled by the oblivious children while they play a game of hide-and-seek. Despite catching some of the children, the boy tricks the spider into keeping his cigar in his mouth as it burns him from the inside. He then drinks gasoline and causes him to die in an explosion, as Mrs. Ladybug returns to the house to discover the truth.
