= Tom Turkey and His Harmonica Humdingers =

1940 film by Hugh Harman

- Title card
- Directed by: Hugh Harman
- Produced by: Hugh Harman; Fred Quimby (uncredited)
- Music by: Scott Bradley (uncredited)
- Color process: Technicolor
- Production company: Metro-Goldwyn-Mayer
- Distributed by: Loew's, Inc.
- Release date: June 8, 1940
- Running time: 7 min
- Country: United States
- Language: English

Tom Turkey and His Harmonica Humdingers is a 1940 American animated short film directed by Hugh Harman. It is one in numerous cartoons directed by Harman for Metro-Goldwyn-Mayer.

== Plot ==
Tom Turkey plays his harmonica and enters a general store after annoying a female turkey. He is joined with his friends. who lack enthusiasm and move slowly until they hear Tom Turkey playing. The commotion causes a shelf to collapse after an old veteran joins in with his fife. The veteran proceeds to sabotage Tom Turkey's "performance" before also joining in. As Tom Turkey dances with a mannequin, the female turkey from earlier is appalled by the commotion and summons the wives of all the turkeys, who force them to go home, except for Tom, the veteran and a policeman who are single.
