= The Bookworm Turns =

1940 film by Hugh Harman

- Title card
- Directed by: Hugh Harman
- Produced by: Hugh Harman; Fred Quimby (uncredited)
- Music by: Scott Bradley (uncredited)
- Color process: Technicolor
- Production company: Metro-Goldwyn-Mayer
- Distributed by: Loew's, Inc.
- Release date: July 20, 1940
- Running time: 8 min
- Country: United States
- Language: English

The Bookworm Turns is a 1940 American animated short film directed by Hugh Harman. It is a sequel to The Bookworm (1939), which Friz Freleng directed before he left for Leon Schlesinger Productions.

== Plot ==
The Raven from The Raven does not feel well and wants to see a doctor. Nearby, Mr Hyde overhears and humorously produces a serum that turns him into Dr Jekyll instead of the other way round. Dr Jekyll realizes the Raven has no brain and decides to conduct a brain transfer with the Bookworm, on the condition the Raven catches him. The Raven finds the Bookworm moaning about his monotonous lifestyle and catches him after toying with him.

The brain transfer succeeds, with the Raven being able to understand complicated ideas while the Bookworm is reduced to a bumbling idiot, made worse by Dr Jekyll turning him into a giant. As the giant Bookworm chases the Raven once again, Dr Jekyll uses a Tesla coil to throw them into apparatus with chemicals, causing them to be mixed with more chemicals and fall on the ground, somehow reverting both of them to normal. The Raven attempts to be educated with the Bookworm and regrets it.
