= Papa Gets the Bird =

1940 film by Hugh Harman

- Title card
- Directed by: Hugh Harman
- Produced by: Hugh Harman; Fred Quimby (uncredited)
- Music by: Scott Bradley (uncredited)
- Color process: Technicolor
- Production company: Metro-Goldwyn-Mayer
- Distributed by: Loew's, Inc.
- Release date: September 6, 1940
- Running time: 7 min
- Country: United States
- Language: English

Papa Gets the Bird is a 1940 American animated short film directed by Hugh Harman. It is the third and final appearance of the Bear Family following A Rainy Day (1940).

== Plot ==
The Bear Family has acquired a canary, who Mama Bear forces Papa Bear to bathe much to his chagrin. He angers the canary and sulks, but is encouraged by his son Wilbur to commit to bathing the canary. The canary refuses to cooperate, causing Papa Bear to chase it into the house until he falls into the well. Wilbur fails to save his father when the canary flies by. As Wilbur chases the canary, Mama Bear attempts to fetch water, only to horrified by Papa Bear with moss on his face. Papa Bear dives into the well after recovering to avoid a scolding by Mama Bear.
