= Blue Onion =

Porcelain dishware design

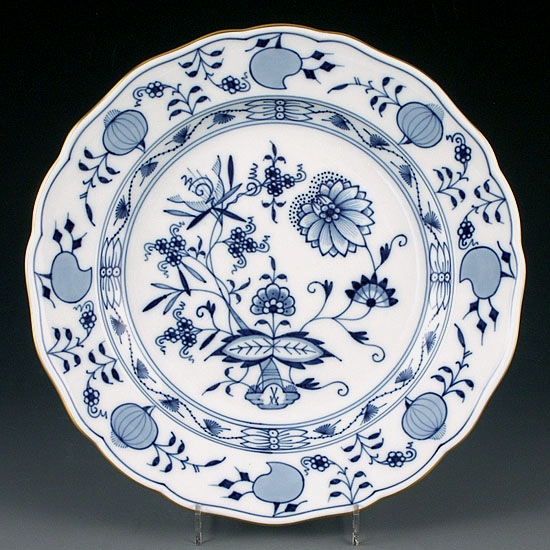
Original Zwiebelmuster. Meissen porcelain plate

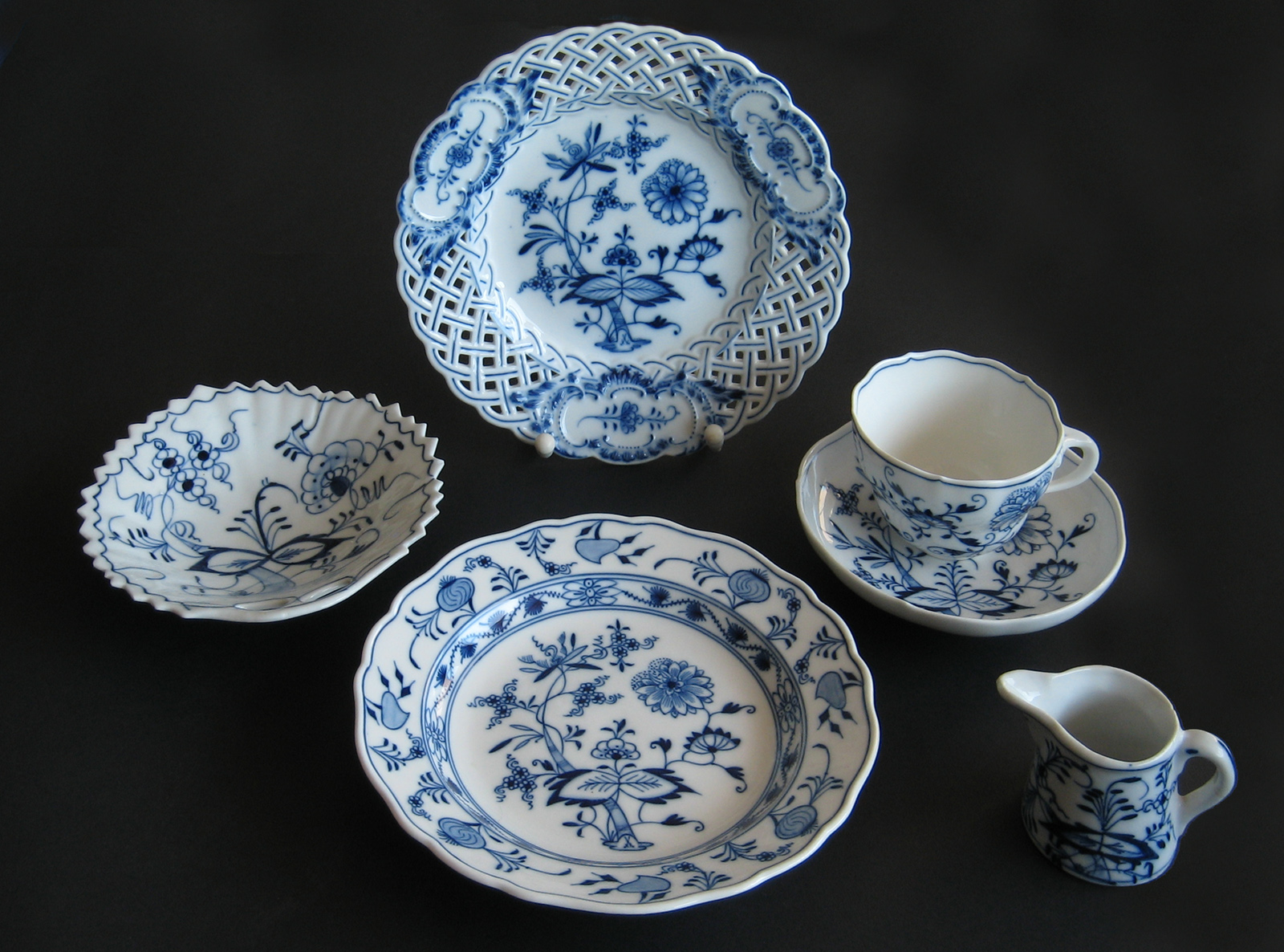
Pieces of table ware with blue onion pattern produced by different German manufacturers around 1900

Blue Onion (German: Zwiebelmuster) is a porcelain tableware pattern for dishware. Originally manufactured by Meissen porcelain in the 18th century and the late 19th Century. It has been copied by other companies.

== History ==
The "onion" pattern was originally named the "bulb" pattern.

The Blue Onion pattern was designed by Johann Gregor Herold in 1739 likely inspired by a Chinese bowl from the Kangxi period. The pattern was modelled after by Chinese porcelain painters, featured pomegranates unfamiliar in Saxony, so the plates and bowls produced in the Meissen factory in 1740 created their own style and feel. Among the earliest Chinese examples are underglaze blue and white porcelains of the early Ming Dynasty. The Meissen painters created hybrids that resembled flora more familiar to Europeans. The so-called "onions" are not onions at all, but, according to historians, are most likely mutations of peaches and pomegranates, modelled on the original Chinese pattern. The design is a grouping of several floral motifs, with peonies and asters in the pattern's centre, and winding stems around a bamboo stalk.

Before the end of the 18th century, other porcelain factories were copying the Meissen Zwiebelmuster. In the 19th century almost all the European manufactories offered a version, with transfer-printed outlines that were coloured in by hand. Enoch Wedgwood's pattern in the 1870s was known as "Meissen". Today, a Japanese version called "Blue Danube" is well-known and featured amongst tableware patterns. (Note: "Blue Danube" is number 7 in "Appendix A: 100 Most Popular Patterns" listed from the records of Replacements.com and illustrated in Shax Riegler. 2011. Dish: 813 Colorful, Wonderful Dinner Plates pp256ff.)

== Characteristics ==
While the design is considered to have originated from an east Asian model, likely Chinese, it also demonstrates the European influence within the abstract stylisation. It is connected with the rhythm and rules of rococo ornamentation: for instance, the asymmetrical motif is composed according to type in various areas, giving the impression of symmetry.

The onion pattern was designed as a white ware decorated with cobalt blue underglaze pattern. Sometimes dishes have gold leaf accents on them. Some rare dishes have a green, red, pink, or black pattern instead of the cobalt blue. A very rare type is called red bud because there are red accents on the blue-and-white dishes.
