= Romeo in Rhythm =

1940 film by Rudolf Ising

- Title card
- Directed by: Rudolf Ising (uncredited)
- Produced by: Rudolf Ising; Fred Quimby (both uncredited)
- Music by: Scott Bradley
- Color process: Technicolor
- Production company: Metro-Goldwyn-Mayer
- Distributed by: Loew's, Inc.
- Release date: August 10, 1940
- Running time: 8 min
- Country: United States
- Language: English

Romeo in Rhythm is a 1940 American animated short film directed by Rudolf Ising. Ising was not credited, with Hugh Harman being mistakenly credited as the cartoon's producer in press releases.

== Plot ==
Crows perform an abridged variation of Romeo and Juliet in the innards of a scarecrow, performing jazz music to the scene where Romeo woos Juliet. The play is disrupted by various interruptions, such as Romeo singing "We're Off to See the Wizard" from The Wizard of Oz (1939) while dressed as the Tin Man and other crows sabotaging the performance.
