= Goldilocks and the Three Bears =

19th-century British fairy tale

"Goldilocks and The Three Bears"
- Short story by Robert Southey
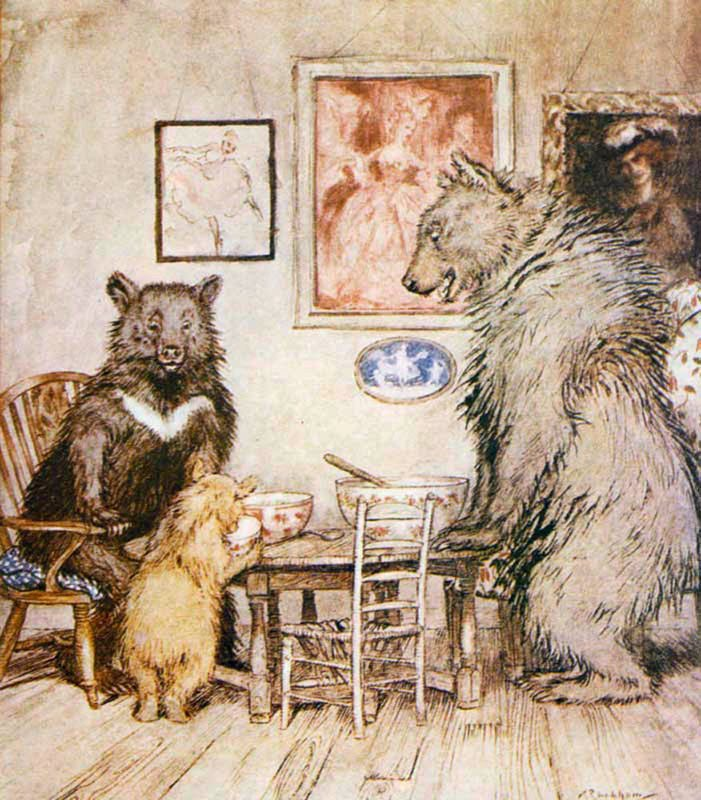
- Illustration by Arthur Rackham, 1918, in English Fairy Tales by Flora Annie Steel
- Original title: "The Story of the Three Bears"
- Country: United Kingdom
- Genre: Fairy tale

Publication
- Published in: The Doctor
- Publication type: Essay and story collection
- Publisher: Longman, Rees, etc.
- Media type: Print
- Publication date: 1837 Narration by Adeline Francis

"Goldilocks and the Three Bears" is a traditional classic 19th-century British fairy tale of which three versions exist. The original version of the tale tells of an impudent and bad old woman who enters the forest home of three anthropomorphic bachelor bears while they are away. She eats some of their porridge, sits down on one of their chairs, breaks it, and sleeps in one of their beds. When the bears return and discover her, they see her wake up and jump out of the window, and she is never seen again. The second version replaces the old woman with a young, naive, blonde-haired girl named Goldilocks; and the third and by far best-known version replaces the bachelor bears with a family of three: a father bear, a mother bear, and a baby bear.

The story has elicited various interpretations and has been adapted to film, opera, and other media. "Goldilocks and the Three Bears" is one of the most popular fairy tales in the English language.

== Southey's version ==
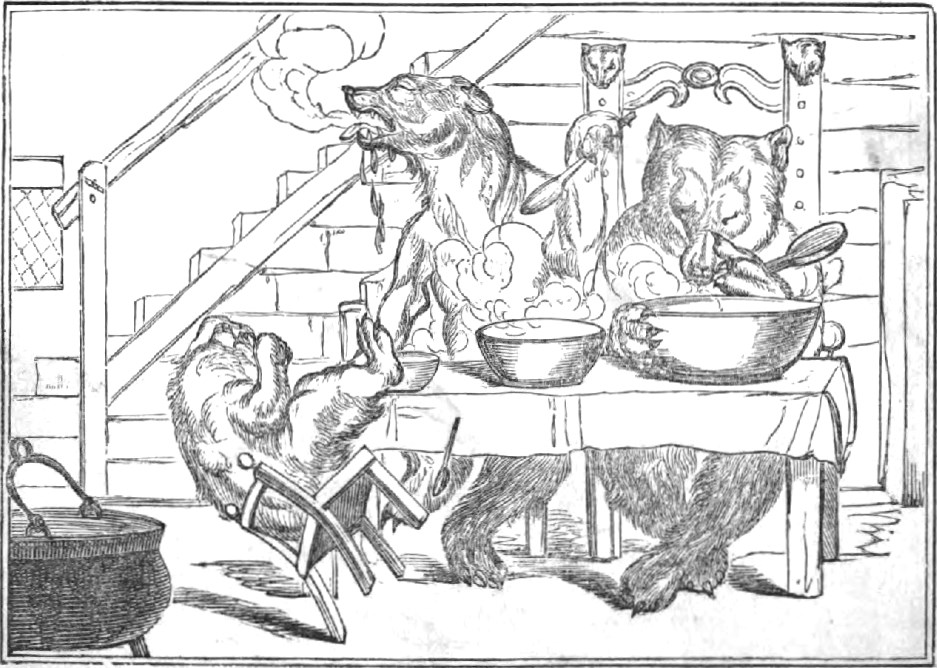
Illustration in "The Story of the Three Bears" second edition, 1839, published by W. N. Wright of 60 Pall Mall, London

In Robert Southey's story, three male bears—a small bear, a medium bear, and a large bear—live together in a house in the woods. Southey describes them as good-natured, trusting, harmless, clean, and hospitable. Each bear has his own bowl of porridge, his own chair, and his own bed. One day, while their hot porridge is cooling, they wander through the woods. An old woman—described throughout the story as insolent, mean, swearing, ugly, dirty, and a vagabond who belongs in a reformatory—discovers the bears' home. She looks through the window and keyhole, opens the latch, and, after ensuring that no one is home, enters. The old woman tries the porridge of the big bear, which is too hot for her; then she tries the porridge of the middle bear, which is too cold; finally, she eats the porridge of the smallest bear. Next, she sits down in the chair of the big bear, which is too hard for her, and then in the chair of the middle bear, which is too soft. When she sits in the chair of the small bear, it breaks as a result. Continuing her exploration of the house, she finds the bears' beds. After trying the big bear's bed and the middle bear's bed and finding them unsuitable, she goes to sleep in the smallest bear's bed. When the bears return home, the story reaches its climax. One after another, they discover that someone has eaten their porridge, has sat in their chairs, and has lain in their beds. The smallest bear finds the old woman in his bed and exclaims, "Someone has lain down in my little bed—and there she is still!" Startled, the old woman jumps out of the window, runs away, and is never seen again.

== Literary elements ==
The story makes extensive use of the literary rule of three, featuring three chairs, three bowls of porridge, three beds, and the three title characters who live in the house. There are also three sequences of the bears discovering in turn that someone has been eating from their porridge, sitting in their chairs, and finally, lying in their beds, at which point the climax of Goldilocks being discovered occurs. This follows three earlier sequences of Goldilocks trying the bowls of porridge, chairs, and beds successively, each time finding the third "just right". Author Christopher Booker characterises this as the "dialectical three" where "the first is wrong in one way, the second in another or opposite way, and only the third, in the middle, is just right". Booker continues: "This idea that the way forward lies in finding an exact middle path between opposites is of extraordinary importance in storytelling".

This concept has spread across many other disciplines, particularly developmental psychology, biology, economics, Buddhism, and engineering, where it is called the "Goldilocks principle". In planetary astronomy, a planet orbiting its sun at just the right distance for liquid water to exist on its surface, neither too hot nor too cold, is referred to as being in the "Goldilocks zone". As Stephen Hawking put it, "Like Goldilocks, the development of intelligent life requires that planetary temperatures be 'just right'".

== Interpretations ==
In The Annotated Classic Fairy Tales (2002), Harvard professor Maria Tatar notes that Southey's story is often viewed as a cautionary fable, conveying a lesson about the dangers of venturing into unknown territories. Similar to The Three Little Pigs, the story uses repetition to capture a child's attention and reinforce themes of protection and safety. Tatar highlights that while today's interpretations of the story often frame it as a quest for discovering what's "just right", earlier generations viewed it as a tale about an intruder who lacked self-control and respect for others' property.

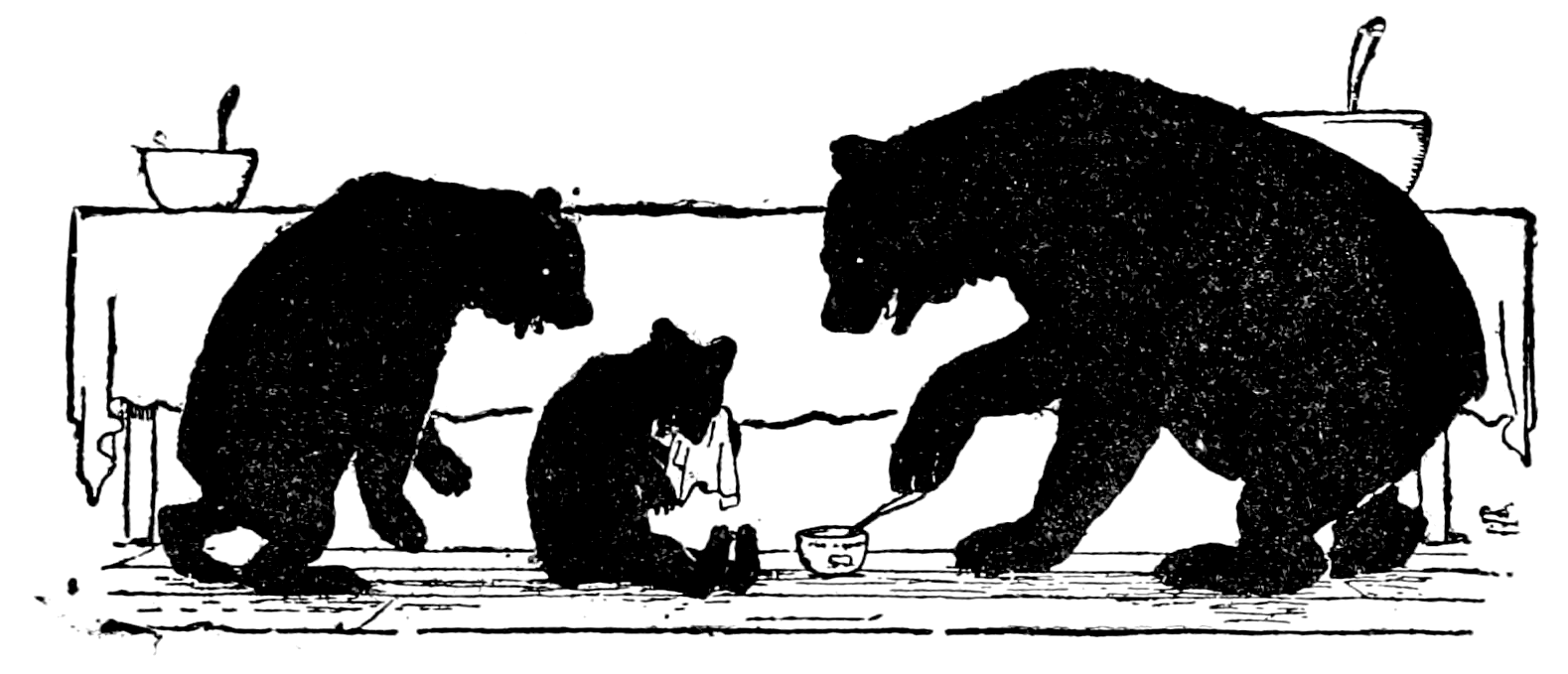
Illustration by Von John D. Batten, 1890

In The Uses of Enchantment (1976), child psychologist Bruno Bettelheim describes Goldilocks as "poor, beautiful, and charming", noting that the story only portrays her hair in a positive light. Bettelheim primarily discusses the tale through the lens of Goldilocks's struggle to overcome Oedipal issues and the identity crisis of adolescence. According to Bettelheim, the story fails to encourage children to truly work through the challenges of growing up, one at a time. It does not end, as a fairy tale should, with the promise of future happiness for those who successfully navigate their Oedipal phase in childhood. He argues that the story prevents the child reader from gaining emotional maturity.

Maria Tatar critiques Bettelheim's interpretation, suggesting that his analysis may overly instrumentalize fairy tales, turning them into vehicles for messages and behavioral models for children. While the story might not resolve Oedipal issues or sibling rivalry in the way Bettelheim believes Cinderella does, it emphasizes the importance of respecting others' property and the consequences of "trying out" things that don't belong to you.

In the Handbook of Psychobiography, Alan C. Elms offers a different perspective, rejecting Bettelheim's view of the story as a tale of post-Oedipal ego development. Instead, he interprets it through the Freudian concept of pre-Oedipal anality. Elms argues that Bettelheim may have overlooked the themes in the story, which could be beneficial for a child's personality development. He believes that the story is mainly aimed at preschool children, who are learning about cleanliness, maintaining order in their environment, and dealing with disruptions to that order. Based on his own experiences and observations, Elms suggests that children are more likely to identify with the clean, orderly bear protagonists rather than with the rebellious, unruly human antagonist. He traces the theme of anality in The Story of the Three Bears back to Robert Southey's meticulous, cleanliness-obsessed aunt, who raised him and passed on her obsession in a milder form.

== In other media ==
=== Film and television ===
- Walt Disney directed an animated film adaptation of "Goldilocks" at his Laugh-O-Gram Studio in 1922
- A second adaptation directed by Hugh Harman and produced by Disney was cancelled and sold to Metro-Goldwyn-Mayer. It launched a short-lived series featuring the Three Bears.
- Coronet Films released a short live-action film featuring real bears and a child in 1958.
- Warner Bros. Cartoons made a few animated shorts with the Three Bears, in which Papa Bear was portrayed as a small but very gruff and short-tempered bear, Mama Bear as a slim, lanky female bear, and Baby Bear as a huge, oafish, simpleton bear named "Junyer". All shorts featuring these characters were directed by Chuck Jones.
- An extended scene in "Rudolph's Shiny New Year" adapts the story, but with Goldilocks replaced by the Baby New Year named Happy.
- Jay Ward did a mangled version of the tale in "Fractured Fairy Tales", in which Goldilocks runs a winter resort and the Three Bears invade her place for hibernation purposes.
- Hanna-Barbera did its take on the original Three Bears tale in basic concept, entitled Help!... It's the Hair Bear Bunch!, which was produced for CBS' Saturday-morning programme in the 1971–72 season. One episode of the series was based loosely on the Goldilocks variant, featuring the ursine trio replacing three humans in ursine costume for a production thereof from Pinchpenny Studios, with child actor Twinkles Sunshine in the Goldilocks role seeking to rewrite such in a more slapstick sort of vein. Previously, Hanna-Barbera used the Hokey Wolf episode "Too Much to Bear" as an interpretation of the Three Bears tale, with a notorious bank robber playing the Goldilocks role and using the Three Bears' house as a hideout.
- In 1984, Faerie Tale Theatre aired an episode titled "Goldilocks", starring Tatum O'Neal.
- The Spanish animated series The Three Bears aired from 1999 to 2001.
- In the Halloween episode "Treehouse of Horror XI" of The Simpsons, there is a scene where Goldilocks is humorously mauled and murdered by the three bears.
- The characters appear in the Shrek franchise. In Shrek (2001), the three bears make a cameo appearance as fairy tale characters exiled by Lord Farquaad. In the 2022 animated film Puss in Boots: The Last Wish, Goldilocks and the Three Bears serve as secondary antagonists.
- Goldilocks and the Three Bears were also made into Muppet characters on Sesame Street.
- The Three Bears appear in puppet form as a recurring segment in the British preschool show The Story Makers.

=== Theater and comics ===
- In November 1949, Walt Disney published the comic The Goldilocks Gambit, written by Carl Barks.
- In 1997, Kurt Schwertsik's 35-minute opera Roald Dahl's Goldilocks (for narrator and orchestra, or eight narrators and orchestra) premiered at the Glasgow Royal Concert Hall. The libretto by Donald Sturrock was based on Roald Dahl's poem Goldilocks and the Three Bears. Set in a forest jury court, the opera portrays Baby Bear on trial for allegedly attacking Miss Goldilocks. The defense attorney highlights the trauma inflicted on the bears by Goldilocks.
- In the series Fables (2002–2024) by Bill Willingham, Goldilocks attempts to stage an uprising of fairy-tale characters.

=== Other ===
- In the toy line Ever After High and its related media, Blondie Lockes is the daughter of Goldilocks.

== See also ==
- Little Red Riding Hood
