= A Rainy Day (1940 film) =

1940 film by Hugh Harman

- Title card
- Directed by: Hugh Harman
- Produced by: Hugh Harman; Fred Quimby (uncredited)
- Music by: Scott Bradley (uncredited)
- Color process: Technicolor
- Production company: Metro-Goldwyn-Mayer
- Distributed by: Loew's, Inc.
- Release date: April 20, 1940
- Running time: 7 min
- Country: United States
- Language: English

A Rainy Day is a 1940 American animated short film directed by Hugh Harman. It is the second appearance of the Bear Family after Goldilocks and the Three Bears and was followed by Papa Gets the Bird in 1940.

== Plot ==
Mother Bear is singing happily as she cleans the house. Upon entering a room she notices light coming in through a hole in the roof. Annoyed that it has not yet been fixed, she calls to Father Bear, disturbing him from his nap in a hammock. As he insists that it is not going to rain that day, the sky suddenly clouds over and a thunder storm rapidly approaches. He reluctantly goes inside to inspect the hole, plugging it with his finger to demonstrate that water would not come in through such a small opening.

Waiting until his wife has left, Father tries to remove his finger, only to find that it has become stuck. He manages to release it whilst also bringing down a section of the roof on his head, leaving a now massive hole. His attempts to set to work are hampered by a series of clumsy mishaps which infuriate him further. Poking her head into the room, Mother tells Father to relax and count to 10, an exercise which ends with him covered in red paint from a paint can that he furiously kicked.

Downstairs in the kitchen, Mother tells their son, Wilbur, to fetch Father a drink of water from the well, as Father struggles to get out onto the roof without damaging it further. The storm finally hits and he is caught in a deluge of rain, as well as struggling with lightning and fierce winds that blow the roof tiles into massive ‘waves’. He falls through the roof into a bedroom that is now completely filled with water. Hearing his son's offers of more water and his wife's incessant singing drift up through the house Father climbs into an underwater bed and, despondent, pulls a blanket over his head as the cartoon ends.
