= Villagers Theatre =

American theatre

Coordinates: 40.4972°N 74.5244°W

Villagers Theatre is a community theater located in the municipal complex of Somerset, New Jersey, United States. It was founded in 1960 and is still running today. The group has a New Playwrights Series where unpublished plays are performed.

== History ==
The theatre was founded in 1960 and began doing shows in the Van Middlesworth Barn. In 1979, the barn was sold, and a new barn was built. The new building opened in 1980, but closed in 1987 due to new fire code laws. Township citizens raised $250,000 to renovate the space, and the theatre re-opened in 1988.

== New Playwrights Series ==
Every year, the theatre takes submissions of new plays by unheard of playwrights and presents staged readings of six new, original shows. Musicals are not accepted, due to the short rehearsal span and lack of time for actors to learn the music. The readings take place once a month from February to May, sometimes with two in one night.

== Major Productions ==
In 2015, the theatre presented the world premiere of Mary Poppins Jr. for their Miniature Musical Makers program. (An acting class and performance program for children 8 to 13.)

Their January 2016 production of Fences received high acclaim and was transferred to a Union County Black History Month festival.

== Education ==
The theatre offers its Miniature Musical Makers program (MMM) for kids ages 9 through 13. MMM is a 12 week program that trains the kids in acting, singing, dancing, and production design, culminating in the performance of a full-length 1 to 2 hour show (with a one weekend run). There is also a teen ensemble, which is the same thing but for ages 14 to 17 and goes for 11 weeks. MMM costs $745 and the teen ensemble is $695. There is a $100 discount for early enrollment.

There is also a Summer Theatre Arts program, offering three different sessions for kids 6-8, 8-12, and 12-16. The program runs for three weeks and costs $850 for a full day program and $450 to go for a half day. The camp culminates in a performance.

== Awards ==
The theatre has won numerous NJACT (New Jersey Association of Community Theatre) Perry Awards. Here are its previous awards:

2009

- Outstanding Lighting Design for a Musical for Jekyll & Hyde
- Outstanding Costume Design for a Musical for Jekyll & Hyde

2010

- Outstanding Costume Design for a Musical for Damn Yankees

2011

- Community Theater Award

2012

- Outstanding Musical Direction for Jesus Christ Superstar
- Outstanding Lead Actor in a Musical for Jesus Christ Superstar

2015

- Outstanding Costume Design for a Musical for Sweeney Todd: The Demon Barber of Fleet Street
- Outstanding Featured Actress in a Musical for Sweeney Todd: The Demon Barber of Fleet Street

== Notable alumni ==
- Jesse Eisenberg
- Brittany Murphy
