= Mickey's Mellerdrammer =

1933 film by Wilfred Jackson

- Directed by: Wilfred Jackson
- Produced by: Walt Disney
- Starring: Pinto Colvig; Walt Disney; Marcellite Garner; Billy Bletcher
- Music by: Oliver Wallace
- Production company: Walt Disney Productions
- Distributed by: United Artists
- Release date: March 18, 1933
- Running time: 8 min
- Country: United States
- Language: English

Mickey's Mellerdrammer is a 1933 American animated short film directed by Wilfred Jackson. The title is a corruption of "melodrama", thought to harken back to the earliest minstrel shows. It is the 54th film of the Mickey Mouse series.

The short is based on Harriet Beecher Stowe's 1852 anti-slavery novel Uncle Tom's Cabin and stars Mickey Mouse and his friends who stage their own production of the novel; Mickey Mouse and some other characters are shown to be dressed in blackface with exaggerated lips, bushy sidewhiskers made out of cotton, and the usual white gloves. Due to its portrayal of racial stereotypes, the film has rarely aired on television.

== Plot ==
Mickey Mouse, Minnie Mouse, Goofy (known then as Dippy Dawg), Horace Horsecollar, and others present their own low budget lighthearted rendition of the 19th-century Tom shows for a crowd in a barn converted into a theater for the occasion.

Horace Horsecollar plays the white slave owner Simon Legree. Minnie plays the young white girl, Eva. Mickey plays old Uncle Tom with cotton around his ears and chin, and the young slave girl Topsy. Clarabelle Cow plays the slave woman Eliza. Goofy plays the production stage hand.

The cartoon opens with Mickey and Clarabelle Cow in their dressing rooms applying blackface makeup for their roles (Mickey originally used a small dynamite to black up his face). The cartoon is much more focused on the Disney characters' efforts to put on the play, than an animated version of Uncle Tom's Cabin. The cartoon contains many images of Mickey and the other characters using makeshift props as sight gags.

The cartoon closes with the characters coming out for a bow, and Horace Horsecollar is pelted with rotten tomatoes. When Goofy shows his face from behind the stage, he is hit with a chocolate pie, leaving him in what appears to be blackface, as Goofy laughs.

== Voice cast ==
- Mickey Mouse: Walt Disney
- Minnie Mouse: Marcellite Garner
- Horace Horsecollar: Billy Bletcher
- Clarabelle Cow: Elvia Allman
- Goofy: Pinto Colvig

== Racial stereotyping ==
Stereotyped characterizations of black people were then common (with Mickey's design itself apparently evolved from blackface caricatures used in minstrel shows, down to the gloves). One of many films and cartoons of its era that referenced Uncle Tom's Cabin, Mickey's Mellerdrammer features Mickey and others in explicit blackface. Henry Louis Gates Jr. wondered how the cartoon evaded censorship of miscegenation, given that Mickey and Minnie portray Tom and Eva, and are "as they say, an item, and unmistakably so". Additionally, Mickey is seen cross-dressing in the role of Topsy.

In the beginning of this short, Clarabelle Cow appears in her dressing room applying lantern soot to her face and leaving an exaggerated area around her lips white. Mickey Mouse then takes a more "comical" approach to applying the makeup: he puts a firecracker in his mouth and lights it, which explodes, causing the ashes to paint his face black while leaving a large area around his lips white.

== Reception ==
Motion Picture Herald reviewed the cartoon on July 1, 1933: "This time Mickey, the inimitable, stages an "Uncle Tom meller", with assorted animated mishaps in the accepted, and approved, Mickey fashion, while the antics of the animated audience contribute not a few of the laughs. It is good cartoon material, and the youngsters, old and young, should enjoy it."

== Home media ==
The short was released on December 7, 2004 on Walt Disney Treasures: Mickey Mouse in Black and White, Volume Two: 1929-1935.

== See also ==
- Mickey Mouse (film series)
- Uncle Tom's Cabaña
- List of entertainers who performed in blackface
