= Swing Social =

1940 film by William Hanna and Joseph Barbera

- Title card
- Directed by: William Hanna; Joseph Barbera
- Produced by: Fred Quimby (uncredited)
- Music by: Scott Bradley (uncredited)
- Color process: Technicolor
- Production company: Metro-Goldwyn-Mayer
- Distributed by: Loew's, Inc.
- Release date: May 18, 1940
- Running time: 8 min
- Country: United States
- Language: English

Swing Social is a 1940 American animated short film directed by William Hanna and Joseph Barbera. It is the first cartoon to be directed by Hanna and Barbera in their own unit after the success of Puss Gets the Boot (1940), which they directed under Rudolf Ising's unit. Barbera disowned the cartoon due to its racist premise.

== Plot ==
A black deacon finds a brother fishing for black bass on Sunday, which he reminds him to be futile due to the bass enjoying their "swing social", much to the bait worm's relief. Underwater, a black catfish sings a jazz song while introducing much of the fish in the form of visual gags.
