= The Blue Danube (1939 film) =

1939 film by Hugh Harman

- Title card
- Directed by: Hugh Harman
- Based on: The Blue Danube by Johann Strauss II
- Produced by: Hugh Harman; Fred Quimby (uncredited)
- Music by: Scott Bradley
- Color process: Technicolor
- Production company: Metro-Goldwyn-Mayer
- Distributed by: Loew's, Inc.
- Release date: October 28, 1939
- Running time: 7 min
- Country: United States
- Language: English

The Blue Danube is a 1939 American animated short film directed by Hugh Harman. It was the third cartoon to be directed by Harman for Metro-Goldwyn-Mayer's cartoon department. It is based on The Blue Danube by Johann Strauss II. Harman regarded the cartoon as one of his best and is one in three cartoons that he did not disown. It was re-released as a Gold Medal Reprint in 1949, rendering the original film lost.

== Plot ==
A conductor conducts a performance of the titular song while natural scenery can be seen. A fairy sings with forest animals to the tune of the song, waking up cherubs who go to work harvesting fruit and grinding fruit into juice, apparently coloring the Danube river this way and replacing the actual water. The cherubs row along the water while the fairy dances.
