= Army–Navy Screen Magazine =

Short film about the Women Airforce Service Pilots, part of the Army–Navy Screen Magazine

The Army–Navy Screen Magazine was a bi-weekly short film series which was shown to American military personnel around the world during World War II. It included a newsreel and a cartoon of Private Snafu. Originally titled The War when first released in May 1943, it was renamed after ten episodes. A total of fifty issues were produced until early 1946 by the Army Signal Corps under the supervision of director Frank Capra. The Private Snafu series was designated classified and were produced by Leon Schlesinger Productions/Warner Bros. Cartoons, UPA, MGM, and Harman-Ising Studio.

A Tale of Two Cities was an Army–Navy Screen Magazine film that tells about the destruction and death caused by atomic bombs dropped on the cities of Hiroshima and Nagasaki, Japan, on August 6 and 9, 1945. An eyewitness account by Jesuit priest Father John Seimes, who had been on the outskirts of Hiroshima, was included. The short film was produced in 1946 by the United States War Department as issue number 74 of the series.
