= The Little Goldfish =

1939 film by Rudolf Ising

- Title card
- Directed by: Rudolf Ising
- Produced by: Rudolf Ising; Fred Quimby (uncredited)
- Music by: Scott Bradley
- Color process: Technicolor
- Production company: Metro-Goldwyn-Mayer
- Distributed by: Loew's, Inc.
- Release date: April 15, 1939
- Running time: 8 min
- Country: United States
- Language: English

The Little Goldfish is a 1939 American animated short film directed by Rudolf Ising. It was the first cartoon to be directed by Ising for Metro-Goldwyn-Mayer's cartoon department; it was initially in development as a Silly Symphony short for Walt Disney Productions until Walt Disney was forced to cancel it due to RKO Radio Pictures' intervention. It was re-released as a Gold Medal reprint in 1948, which fixed an incorrect ocean background on the original title card.

== Plot ==
A goldfish is bored of its monotonous life in a fishbowl. It finds a book about fish living in the ocean and envies their freedom. The goldfish's owner decides to change its water at the kitchen sink, but neglects it upon receiving a phone call. The overflowing water allows the goldfish to escape and be washed down the sewers. It arrives at the ocean and meets a variety of strange fish who are hostile to him. It risks being eaten by a crab and octopus. After running from a giant fish, it is trapped in a bubble. The goldfish wakes up from a nightmare, which apparently had been formed after seeing pages of sea creatures. It is grateful to have a home all to itself.
