= Home on the Range (1940 film) =

1939 film by Rudolf Ising

- Title card
- Directed by: Rudolf Ising
- Produced by: Rudolf Ising; Fred Quimby (uncredited)
- Music by: Scott Bradley (uncredited)
- Color process: Technicolor
- Production company: Metro-Goldwyn-Mayer
- Distributed by: Loew's, Inc.
- Release date: March 23, 1940
- Running time: 7 min
- Country: United States
- Language: English

Home on the Range is a 1940 American animated short film directed by Rudolf Ising. It is one in numerous cartoons directed by Ising for Metro-Goldwyn-Mayer.

== Plot ==
A cow and her child sit near a campfire. The calfs spooked by a nearby jackrabbit and chases it. After the jackrabbit hides in a bush with quails, the jackrabbit runs into a forest where a coyote follows them. The coyote chases the calf into a cave. Regretting luring the calf in the first place, the jackrabbit unsuccessfully taunts the coyote before deciding to notify the calf's mother. As the forest animals use a porcupine and a log as a battering ram to distract the coyote, the coyote comes upon the cow who scares him into escaping. The cow is reunited with her child, who bids goodbye to the jackrabbit.
