= Goldilocks and the Three Bears (1939 film) =

1939 film by Hugh Harman

- Title card
- Directed by: Hugh Harman
- Based on: Goldilocks and the Three Bears
- Produced by: Hugh Harman; Fred Quimby (uncredited)
- Music by: Scott Bradley
- Color process: Technicolor
- Production company: Metro-Goldwyn-Mayer
- Distributed by: Loew's, Inc.
- Release date: July 14, 1939
- Running time: 10 min
- Country: United States
- Language: English

Goldilocks and the Three Bears is a 1939 American animated short film directed by Hugh Harman. It was the second cartoon to be directed by Harman for Metro-Goldwyn-Mayer's cartoon department; it was initially in development as a Silly Symphony short for Walt Disney Productions until Walt Disney was forced to cancel it due to RKO Radio Pictures' intervention. The Bear Family would appear in their own spin-off series, which includes A Rainy Day and Papa Gets the Bird (both 1940). It was the first MGM cartoon to be re-released as a Gold Medal Reprint in 1947, and was re-released again in 1957.

== Plot ==
The Bear Family find their porridge breakfast to be too hot and reluctantly go out for a walk after Papa Bear is thrown into the backyard in pain for trying it. Goldilocks breaks in and drinks Baby Bear's porridge. The Bear Family engage in wacky shenanigans before returning home. Papa Bear and Momma Bear find their porridge intact, but Baby Bear is horrified to find his porridge gone. The paranoid Bear Family prepare a shotgun and more weapons, somehow injuring each other. After scaring off Goldilocks, Papa Bear is punished for overreacting in the first place.
