= The Mad Maestro =

1939 film by Isadore Freleng

- Title card
- Directed by: Isadore Freleng (uncredited)
- Produced by: Hugh Harman; Fred Quimby (uncredited)
- Music by: Scott Bradley
- Color process: Technicolor
- Production company: Metro-Goldwyn-Mayer
- Distributed by: Loew's, Inc.
- Release date: December 30, 1939
- Running time: 7 min
- Country: United States
- Language: English

The Mad Maestro is a 1939 American animated short film directed by Isadore Freleng. It was the second and final cartoon to be directed by Freleng under Hugh Harman for Metro-Goldwyn-Mayer's cartoon department, after which he returned to Leon Schlesinger Productions.

== Plot ==
Stanislausy Smellerdorff conducts an inept band of animal musicians in an orchestra. He proves to be equally inept by poorly handling the musicians. The musicians interrupt the performance with their own quirks, ineptitude or simply due to the nature of their own performance. A percussionist is prevented from playing a single note that he is instructed to play and hits the tired conductor instead.
