= Nero Wolfe (disambiguation) =

Nero Wolfe is a fictional detective character.

Nero Wolfe also may refer to:

- Nero Wolfe (film), a 1977 ABC TV movie starring Thayer David and Tom Mason
- Nero Wolfe (1981 TV series), an NBC TV series starring William Conrad and Lee Horsley
- Nero Wolfe (1982 radio series), a 1982 Canadian Broadcasting Corporation radio series starring Mavor Moore
- Nero Wolfe (2001 TV series), also known as A Nero Wolfe Mystery a 2001–2002 A&E television network series starring Maury Chaykin and Timothy Hutton

== See also ==
- The Adventures of Nero Wolfe, a 1943–1944 ABC radio series
- The Amazing Nero Wolfe, a 1945 Mutual radio series starring Francis X. Bushman
- The New Adventures of Nero Wolfe, a 1950–1951 NBC radio series starring Sydney Greenstreet
