= The Amazing Nero Wolfe =

US radio program

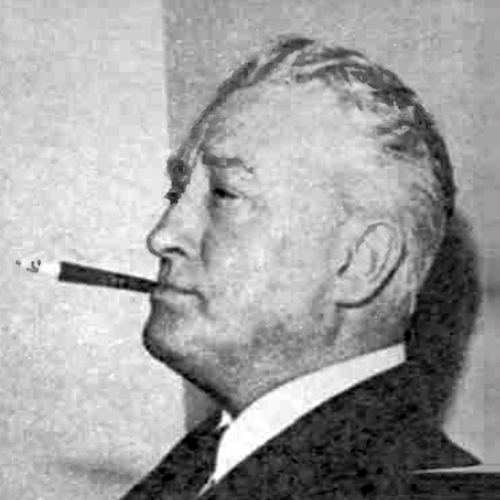
- Francis X. Bushman as Nero Wolfe (1945)
- Genre: Detective mystery
- Running time: 30 minutes
- Country of origin: United States
- Language(s): English
- Syndicates: Mutual Broadcasting System (Don Lee Network)
- Starring: Francis X. Bushman; Elliott Lewis; Charles Victor
- Announcer: Jim Bannon
- Created by: Rex Stout
- Written by: Louis Vittes
- Directed by: Travis Wells
- Produced by: Travis Wells
- Original release: July 17 – November 30, 1945
- No. of episodes: 21

The Amazing Nero Wolfe is a 1945 American radio drama series starring Francis X. Bushman as Rex Stout's fictional armchair detective Nero Wolfe. Broadcast July 17–November 30, 1945, the series was created by the Don Lee Network, a California affiliate of the Mutual Broadcasting System, and may have been broadcast only in that region. The Amazing Nero Wolfe was based on Stout's principal characters but not his stories.

== Production ==
The Amazing Nero Wolfe starred Francis X. Bushman as Wolfe. Wolfe's legman Archie Goodwin was played by Elliott Lewis and Charles Victor. Broadcast July 17–November 30, 1945, The Amazing Nero Wolfe was a product of the Don Lee Network, a California affiliate of the Mutual Broadcasting System. The weekly series may have been broadcast only in that region.

The series was produced and directed by Travis Wells and announced by Jim Bannon. Louis Vittes wrote the scripts for the 30-minute program. Vittes had written the previous ABC radio series, The Adventures of Nero Wolfe (1943–44), which was based on Stout's principal characters but not his stories.

Although 21 episodes were produced, the series finale, "The Case of the Shakespeare Folio", is the only episode of The Amazing Nero Wolfe that has survived in radio collections.

== See also ==
- The Adventures of Nero Wolfe, a 1943–44 ABC radio series starring Santos Ortega and Luis van Rooten
- The New Adventures of Nero Wolfe, a 1950–51 NBC radio series starring Sydney Greenstreet
- Nero Wolfe (1982 radio series), a 1982 Canadian Broadcasting Corporation radio series starring Mavor Moore
