= List of fictional characters with stars on the Hollywood Walk of Fame =

The Hollywood Walk of Fame has awarded more than 2,750 stars to notable people in the film, television, music, radio, live theatre, and sports entertainment industries. However, some of the stars have also been awarded to fictional characters. The following is a list of fictional characters with stars on the Hollywood Walk of Fame, including the category and location of each honoree.

== Fictional characters ==
As of 2024, 20 fictional characters have received stars on the Hollywood Walk of Fame, 15 for motion pictures and 5 for television. Of these stars, 1 character received a star in the 1970s, 3 in the 1980s, 2 in the 1990s, 7 in the 2000s, 6 in the 2010s, and 1 in the 2020s. 9 stars belong to Disney characters, 3 stars belong to Warner Bros. characters, and 2 stars belong to Comcast characters. Batman is the most recent character to receive a star, as of September 26, 2024.

Character(s)	Current copyright holder	Category	Creator(s)	Date	Location	Reason
Alvin and the Chipmunks	Bagdasarian Productions	Television	Ross Bagdasarian Sr.	March 14, 2019	6600 Hollywood Blvd.	For their role in their studio albums, television shows and films. Dedicated on their 60th anniversary.
Batman	DC Comics (Skydance Corporation)	Motion pictures	Bob Kane; Bill Finger	September 26, 2024	6764 Hollywood Blvd.	For his role in feature films. Dedicated on his 85th anniversary. The first star for a superhero.
Big Bird	Sesame Workshop	Television	Jim Henson; Kermit Love	April 21, 1994	7021 Hollywood Blvd.	For his leading role in the children's television show, Sesame Street. Dedicated on his 25th anniversary.
Bugs Bunny	Warner Bros. (Skydance Corporation)	Motion pictures	Ben Hardaway; Cal Dalton; Charles Thorson; Tex Avery; Chuck Jones; Bob Givens; Robert McKimson	December 10, 1985	7007 Hollywood Blvd.	For his role in the Looney Tunes short films. Dedicated on his 45th anniversary. The second star for an animated cartoon character.
Donald Duck	The Walt Disney Company	Motion pictures	Walt Disney; Dick Lundy	August 9, 2004	6840 Hollywood Blvd.	For his role in animated short films. Dedicated on his 70th anniversary.
Kermit the Frog	The Walt Disney Company	Television	Jim Henson	November 14, 2002	6801 Hollywood Blvd.	For his leading role in The Muppet Show. Dedicated on the show's 25th anniversary.
Godzilla	Toho	Motion pictures	Tomoyuki Tanaka; Ishirō Honda; Eiji Tsuburaya	November 29, 2004	6925 Hollywood Blvd.	For his role in the kaiju films. Dedicated on his 50th anniversary.
Pee-wee Herman	Pee-wee Pictures	Motion pictures	Paul Reubens	July 20, 1988	6562 Hollywood Blvd.	For his role in his television shows and films. Dedicated on his 10th anniversary.
Mickey Mouse	The Walt Disney Company	Motion pictures	Walt Disney; Ub Iwerks	November 13, 1978	6925 Hollywood Blvd.	For his role in animated short films. Dedicated on his 50th anniversary. The first star for an animated cartoon character.
Minnie Mouse	The Walt Disney Company	Motion pictures	Walt Disney; Ub Iwerks	January 22, 2018	6834 Hollywood Blvd.	For her role in animated short films, and for her role as a prominent fashion influencer since her debut. Dedicated on her 90th anniversary.
The Munchkins	Turner Entertainment (Skydance Corporation)	Motion pictures	L. Frank Baum	November 20, 2007	6900 Hollywood Blvd.	For their role in the 1939 film, The Wizard of Oz. Dedicated on the film's 70th anniversary. The largest group of individuals represented by a single star.
The Muppets	The Walt Disney Company	Motion pictures	Jim Henson	March 20, 2012	6834 Hollywood Blvd.	For their role in their television shows and films. Dedicated on their 57th anniversary.
Rugrats	Nickelodeon (Skydance Corporation)	Television	Arlene Klasky; Gábor Csupó; Paul Germain	June 28, 2001	6600 Hollywood Blvd.	For their role in their television show. Dedicated on their 10th anniversary.
Shrek	DreamWorks Animation (Comcast)	Motion pictures	William Steig	May 20, 2010	6931 Hollywood Blvd.	For his role in his animated feature films. Dedicated on his 20th anniversary.
The Simpsons	20th Television Animation (The Walt Disney Company)	Television	Matt Groening	January 14, 2000	7021 Hollywood Blvd.	For their role in their television show, The Simpsons. Dedicated on the show's 10th anniversary.
Snoopy	Peanuts Worldwide	Motion pictures	Charles M. Schulz	November 2, 2015	7021 Hollywood Blvd.	For his role in the Peanuts animated television specials and films. Dedicated on his 65th anniversary.
Snow White	The Walt Disney Company	Motion pictures	Brothers Grimm	June 28, 1987	6920 Hollywood Blvd.	For her role in the first full-length Disney animated film, Snow White and the Seven Dwarfs. Dedicated on the film's 50th anniversary. The first star for a female character.
Tinker Bell	The Walt Disney Company	Motion pictures	J. M. Barrie	September 21, 2010	6834 Hollywood Blvd.	For her silent role in all of the Neverland films, and her role as the mascot of Disneyland. Dedicated on her 105th anniversary.
Winnie the Pooh	The Walt Disney Company	Motion pictures	A. A. Milne	April 11, 2006	6834 Hollywood Blvd.	For his role in his animated films. Dedicated on his 80th anniversary.
Woody Woodpecker	Universal Pictures (Comcast)	Motion pictures	Walter Lantz Ben Hardaway	September 13, 1990	7000 Hollywood Blvd.	For his role in animated short films. Dedicated on his 50th anniversary.

== Actors with a character name inscribed with them ==
Actor and character	Character copyright holder	Category	Character Creator(s)	Date	Location	Notes
Clayton Moore - The Lone Ranger	WXYZ	Television	Fran Striker; George W. Trendle	June 5, 1987	6914 Hollywood Blvd.	Honored for Moore's portrayal as the title character in The Lone Ranger.
Tommy Riggs and Betty Lou	WPGP	Radio	Tommy Riggs	February 8, 1960	6164 Hollywood Blvd.	"Tommy Riggs switched back and forth from his natural baritone to the voice of a seven-year-old girl, Betty Lou."

== Live-action animals ==
One fictional live-action canine has a star on the Walk. Two additional live action canines (Rin Tin Tin and Strongheart) are on the Walk, but they are not fictional.

Character	Parent Company	Category	Creator	Date	Location
Lassie	Classic Media (Comcast)	Motion pictures	Eric Knight	February 8, 1960	6368 Hollywood Blvd.

== See also ==
- List of stars on the Hollywood Walk of Fame
