= Happy-Go-Nutty =

1944 film by Tex Avery

- Directed by: Tex Avery
- Story by: Heck Allen
- Produced by: Fred Quimby (uncredited)
- Starring: Wally Maher; Tex Avery
- Music by: Scott Bradley
- Animation by: Ed Love; Ray Abrams; Preston Blair
- Color process: Technicolor
- Production company: Metro-Goldwyn-Mayer
- Distributed by: Loews, Inc.
- Release date: June 24, 1944
- Running time: 7 min
- Country: United States
- Language: English

Happy-Go-Nutty is a 1944 American animated comedy short film directed by Tex Avery. It is the second film in the Screwy Squirrel series. It was originally released on June 24, 1944.

== Plot ==
Screwy Squirrel is locked up in a lunatic asylum named Moron Manor. Despite the nearly non-existent security, he executes a planned escape and proclaims that he is Napoleon (for which he is locked up), immediately rushing to wake up the guard Meathead the dog, who wakes up after a series of loud noises do not work.

The duo begin their chase. Screwy Squirrel pretends to be a passerby who describes himself in detail and even dons Napoleon's hat; Meathead is too stupid to realize and falls off a nearby cliff he is directed to. Screwy then hands him a newspaper that depicts his failure to his chagrin.

Meathead sniffs for tracks; his nose leaves him and heads in the right direction while his body takes a wrong turn. Screwy hits it with a mallet, causing it to shriek in pain and hide in Meathead's skin out of fear. Later, Meathead paints a bomb pink in a vain attempt to trick Screwy. Screwy eats it like an apple and disposes of the core, which Meathead picks up to eat and is hit by the explosion, leaving him in blackface. Screwy reacts in amusement and hides in a tree, only to leave after finding a skunk inside. Meathead finds that Screwy dropped his hat, believing him to inside, only to find the skunk to his horror.

The duo continue their chase when Screwy finds a rogue telephone in the wild. He answers it and says "You don't say..." multiple times while Meathead overhears. Screwy then explains that nothing is being said and runs away. Screwy forces Meathead to take aspirin then hits him when he notes that he does not have a headache to require it. Meathead then disappears to his confusion, who then traps him in a bag, only to find a clone of Screwy in his way. He then releases Screwy to check if Screwy has indeed escaped, then disposes of the clone in a conveniently placed trash can. Meathead then brings out an egg, which Screwy did not expect and throws it in Meathead's face anyway.

The duo continue their chase, splitting into three in a three way path before regrouping and turning right. They run into a cave, where an unseen violent confrontation occurs. Screwy then lights a match and says, "Sure was a funny gag... too bad you couldn't see it!" The duo then leave and take a short break drinking CooCoo Cola before continuing their chase.

Screwy enters a tree and escapes through a bottom hole, before donning an army outfit with a knife. He stabs Meathead multiple times in the back, revealing it to be a rubber knife after Meathead apparently remains unscathed. He then finds a kinetoscope and watches it, which is revealed to be Meathead's shotgun in disguise. They then run across the ending screen, where they put aside their differences and decide to end the film. Screwy then inquires Meathead about his motives for chasing him, only for Meathead to profess that he is the crazy one of all time, proclaiming to be Napoleon again before running back to the asylum. Screwy exclaims the ending's apparent silliness.

== Voice cast ==
- Wally Maher as Screwy Squirrel (uncredited)
- Tex Avery as Meathead the Dog (uncredited)

== Legacy ==
On April Fools' Day in 1997, Cartoon Network broadcast an edited version (minus one blackface gag) of the film repeatedly from 6 am to 6 pm, as part of an April Fool's joke that the character had seized control of the network. Due to its unannounced and highly repetitive nature, Cartoon Network instead aired Looney Tunes shorts for the rest of the day, never attempting another similar April Fools' joke in this fashion outside of the Adult Swim block in the future.
