= Lawrence Dobkin =

American actor, director and screenwriter (1919–2002)

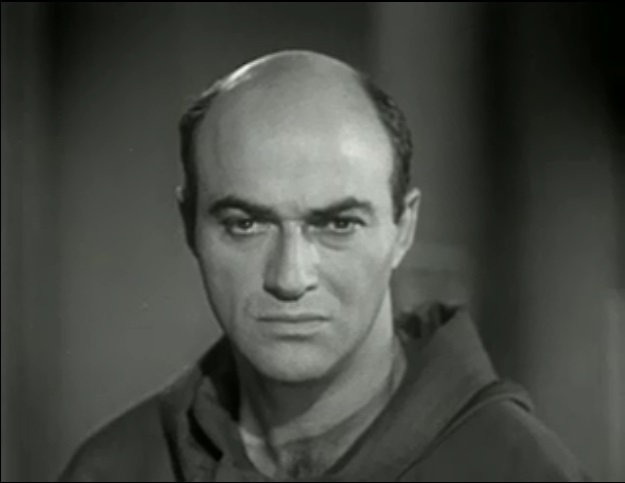
- Dobkin in Raiders of Old California (1957)
- Born: September 16, 1919; New York City, New York, U.S.
- Died: October 28, 2002 (aged 83); Los Angeles, California, U.S.
- Education: Yale University
- Occupations: Actor; director; screenwriter
- Years active: 1946–2001
- Spouses: Frances Hope Walker (m. 1942; div. 1960) Joanna Barnes (m. 1962; div. 1967) Anne Collings (m. 1970)
- Children: 3

Lawrence Dobkin (September 16, 1919 – October 28, 2002) was an American television director, character actor and screenwriter whose career spanned seven decades.

Dobkin was a prolific performer during the Golden Age of Radio. He narrated the western Broken Arrow (1950). His film performances include Never Fear (1949), Sweet Smell of Success (1957), North by Northwest (1959) and Geronimo (1962). Before the closing credits of each episode of the landmark ABC television network series Naked City (1958–1963), he said, "There are eight million stories in the naked city. This has been one of them."

== Early years ==
Dobkin was born in Manhattan, New York City to a Jewish family. His parents were Samuel Dobkin (1888–1948) and Frieda (née Feder, 1890–1984). Dobkin served in a radio propaganda unit of the U.S. Army Air Forces during World War II.

== Radio ==
Dobkin understudied on Broadway. When he returned to network radio he was one of five actors who played the detective Ellery Queen in The Adventures of Ellery Queen. In The New Adventures of Nero Wolfe (1950–1951), Dobkin played detective Archie Goodwin opposite Sydney Greenstreet's Nero Wolfe.

While playing Louie, "The Saint"'s cab-driving sidekick on NBC Radio in 1951, he was asked to step into the lead role of Simon Templar to replace Tom Conway for a single episode — making Dobkin one of the many actors to portray Leslie Charteris' literary creation.

Other radio work included Escape (1947–1954); Gunsmoke (1952–1961); Yours Truly, Johnny Dollar (1956–1960); and the anthology series Lux Radio Theater. "The few of us who are left," Dobkin said of his radio days not long before he died, "keep telling each other that we never had it so good."

He played Lieutenant Matthews on The Adventures of Philip Marlowe, along with several other characters. Continuing to work as a voice actor throughout his career, Dobkin contributed to the video game Tom Clancy's Rainbow Six: Rogue Spear (1999).

== Television ==
Dobkin began a prolific career in television in 1946, having worked as an actor, narrator and director. In 1953, he guest-starred on Alan Hale, Jr.'s short-lived CBS espionage series set in the Cold War, Biff Baker, U.S.A.. He was cast in a 1957 episode of the syndicated series The Silent Service, based on true stories of the submarine division of the United States Navy; he was the lead in the episode "The Ordeal of the S 38" (incorrectly credited as "Lawrence Bodkin"). He appeared also in the religion anthology series, Crossroads, based on experiences of American clergymen, and later on the ABC religion drama, Going My Way, starring Gene Kelly.

In the 1950s situation comedy I Love Lucy, Dobkin played the roles of "Restaurant Man" in episode 66 ("Ricky and Fred Are TV Fans"), "Waiter" in episode 70 ("Equal Rights"), and "Counterfeiter" in episode 145 ("Paris at Last").

In the 1957-1958 television season, Dobkin played a director on the CBS sitcom, Mr. Adams and Eve, starring Howard Duff and Ida Lupino as fictitious married actors residing in Beverly Hills, California. He guest-starred in 1958 in the first season of ABC's The Donna Reed Show.

In 1957, Dobkin appeared in the third episode of the first season of the CBS Television western Have Gun – Will Travel, entitled "The Great Mohave Chase", as the owner of water rights in the small western town of Mohave.

In the May 9, 1958 episode of the CBS Television western series Trackdown entitled, "The End of the World", he portrays a con man named Walter Trump who promises to save a town from destruction by building a wall.

In 1960, Dobkin appeared as Kurt Reynolds in the episode "So Dim the Light" of the CBS anthology series The DuPont Show with June Allyson, and as an escape artist on the run from a possible murder charge in Wanted: Dead or Alive. That same year he played "Esteban Garcia" (a long time friend of Marshal Dillon where things go very wrong) in the TV Western Gunsmoke, in the episode "Don Matteo" (S6E7). He appeared in the David Janssen crime drama series, Richard Diamond, Private Detective. Dobkin appeared in four episodes of The Rifleman playing four different characters, including a heartfelt portrayal of General Philip Sheridan from the American Civil War. He appeared in an episode of The Tab Hunter Show in 1961. In 1964 he narrated the USIS documentary film about the Republican and Democrat conventions called "1964 The Conventions."

Often also cast as a villain, Dobkin portrayed gangster Dutch Schultz on ABC's The Untouchables. He appeared on the ABC/Warner Bros. crime drama, The Roaring 20s and in the NBC western with a modern setting, Empire. He was cast as a mass murderer in the 1972 pilot for ABC's The Streets of San Francisco, starring Karl Malden. He guest-starred on ABC's The Big Valley, starring Barbara Stanwyck. He received an Emmy Award nomination for Outstanding Performance by an Actor in a Supporting Role in a Drama for his work on the CBS Playhouse episode, Do Not Go Gentle Into That Good Night (1967). In 1991, Dobkin appeared in an episode of the television series Night Court as State Supreme Court Justice Welch.

In the Star Trek media franchise Dobkin directed the original series episode "Charlie X", and later portrayed the traitorous Klingon ambassador Kell on Star Trek: The Next Generation in the fourth-season episode "The Mind's Eye".

As a writer, Dobkin created the title character for the 1974 film and the 1977–1978 NBC series The Life and Times of Grizzly Adams.

He began directing for television in 1960, and his work in this area included episodes 1, 9, 10, and 13 of The Munsters (1964), 16 episodes of The Waltons (1972–1981), and an episode of Sara (1976). Dobkin also guest-starred on a 1983 episode of Knight Rider.

== Films ==
Dobkin's notable supporting film roles include Twelve O'Clock High (1949), The Day the Earth Stood Still (1951), Julius Caesar (1953), The Ten Commandments (1956), The Defiant Ones (1958), Johnny Yuma (1966) and Patton (1970). He had a cameo appearance in the 1954 sci-fi thriller Them. In an uncredited performance in Alfred Hitchcock's North by Northwest, Dobkin has a memorable line as an intelligence official who remarks on the plight of the hapless protagonist, on the run for murder after being mistaken for a person who doesn't exist: "It's so horribly sad. Why is it I feel like laughing?"

== Personal life ==
On June 24, 1961, Dobkin married the actress Joanna Barnes; they had no children, but he had one daughter, Debra Dobkin, by his first wife, Frances Hope Walker. Dobkin married the actress Anne Collings in 1970 and had two children: identical twin daughters, Kristy and Kaela.

== Death ==
On October 28, 2002, Dobkin died of heart failure at age 83 at his Los Angeles home.

== Filmography ==
- Not Wanted (1949) - Assistant District Attorney
- Whirlpool (1949) - Surgeon Wayne (uncredited)
- Twelve O'Clock High (1949) - Capt. Twombley (uncredited)
- Never Fear (1949) - Dr. Middleton
- D.O.A. (1950) - Dr. Schaefer
- Frenchie (1950) - Bartender
- Broken Arrow (1950) - (uncredited)
- Chain of Circumstance (1951) - Dr. Callen
- People Will Talk (1951) - Business Manager (uncredited)
- The Mob (1951) - Clegg's Doctor (uncredited)
- Angels in the Outfield (1951) - Rabbi Allen Hahn (uncredited)
- The Day the Earth Stood Still (1951) - Army Physician (uncredited)
- On the Loose (1951) - Ruegg, Defense Attorney (uncredited)
- Bannerline (1951) - Hugo's Doctor (uncredited)
- The Living Christ Series (1951) - Caiaphas
- Red Skies of Montana (1952) - Leo (uncredited)
- The First Time (1952) - Doctor (uncredited)
- 5 Fingers (1952) - Santos (uncredited)
- Deadline - U.S.A. (1952) - Larry Hansen, Rienzi's Lawyer (uncredited)
- Loan Shark (1952) - Walter Kerry
- Young Man with Ideas (1952) - Prosecutor at Hearing (uncredited)
- Diplomatic Courier (1952) - Russian Agent (uncredited)
- Washington Story (1952) - Secretary of the Senate (uncredited)
- Above and Beyond (1952) - Dr. Van Dyke
- Ma and Pa Kettle on Vacation (1953) - U.S. Agent James Farrell (uncredited)
- Julius Caesar (1953) - Citizen of Rome
- Remains to Be Seen (1953) - Captain (uncredited)
- The Affairs of Dobie Gillis (1953) - Mr. McCandless, Student Advisor (uncredited)
- Riders to the Stars (1954) - Dr. Delmar
- The Long Wait (1954) - Doctor (uncredited)
- Them! (1954) - Los Angeles City Engineer (uncredited)
- Sabaka (1954) - General's Aide (uncredited)
- The Silver Chalice (1954) - Epharim
- Day of Triumph (1954) - Matthew
- African Manhunt (1955) - Commentator (voice)
- Jump Into Hell (1955) - Maj. Maurice Bonet
- Kiss of Fire (1955) - Padre Domingo
- Illegal (1955) - Al Carol
- The Killer Is Loose (1956) - Bank Robber (uncredited)
- That Certain Feeling (1956) - Bit Part (uncredited)
- The Ten Commandments (1956) - Hur Ben Caleb
- The Badge of Marshal Brennan (1957) - Chicamon
- Sweet Smell of Success (1957) - Leo Bartha (uncredited)
- Portland Exposé (1957) - Garnell
- Raiders of Old California (1957) - Don Miguel Sebastian
- The Defiant Ones (1958) - Editor
- Wild Heritage (1958) - Josh Burrage
- The Lost Missile (1958) - Narrator (voice)
- Tokyo After Dark (1959) - Maj. Bradley
- North by Northwest (1959) - U.S. Intelligence Agency official (uncredited)
- The Big Operator (1959) - Phil Cernak
- The Gene Krupa Story (1959) - Speaker Willis
- Geronimo (1962) - Gen. George A. Crook
- The Cabinet of Caligari (1962) - Dr. Frank David
- Johnny Yuma (1966) - Linus Jerome Carradine
- Patton (1970) - Colonel Gaston Bell
- Underground (1970) - Boule
- The Midnight Man (1974) - Mason
- Hotwire (1980) - Bodine
- Beastmaster 2: Through the Portal of Time (1991) - Admiral Binns

=== Television ===
- Space Patrol (1950–1953) multiple episodes as Marco
- The Adventures of Superman (1953) - S2 E3 "The man who Could Read Minds" - the Swami.
- Biff Baker, U.S.A. (1953) - Shahab Hussein (as Larry Dobkin)
- I Love Lucy, 2 episodes: "Equal Rights" and "Paris at Last" (1953–1956) - Waiter / Counterfeiter
- Gunsmoke (1956–1960) - Jacklin /Outlaw Brand /Mr. Garcia
- Mr. Adams and Eve (1957–1958) - Max Cassolini / Director
- Richard Diamond, Private Detective (1957) - Warburton Flagge
- The Silent Service (1957) - "The Ordeal of The S 38" - Chappie - mistakenly cast listed as Lawrence Bodkin
- Adventures of the Falcon (1957) – Jack McKenzie in "Snake Eyes"
- Trackdown, 3 episodes: "Look For the Woman", "The Boy", and "The End of the World" (1957–8) - Lee Caldwell / Joel Paine / Walter Trump
- Naked City (1958–1963) - Narrator
- Riverboat (1959) Episode: “the Strange Request” -David Fields
- The Donna Reed Show (1958) - Dr. Winfield Graham
- The Untouchables (1959–1960) - Gangster Dutch Schultz, Falcon, 1957,
- Have Gun – Will Travel (1957–1963) - Ranch Owner Billy Joe Kane, 1957; Col. Oliver Lacey, 1962, "Penelope"
- The Rifleman (1958–1962) - Ben Judson / Don Chimera del Laredo / Gen. Philip H. Sheridan / Juan Argentez
- Wanted: Dead or Alive - (1959) - Bartolo Baffler
- Cheyenne (1960) - 'General Sheridan' *Credited as Larry Dobkin* Episode: "Gold, Glory and Custer - Requiem"
- The DuPont Show with June Allyson (1960) - "So Dim the Light" - Kurt Reynolds
- The Roaring 20s (1960–1961) - Max Winslow / Big Lou Burnett
- The Tab Hunter Show (1961) - "Holiday in Spain" — Calleja
- Stagecoach West (1961) - S1 E26 “Fort Wyatt Crossing” - Captain Eli.
- Rawhide
  - Rawhide (1961) – Pascal in S4:E8, "The Prairie Elephant"
  - Rawhide (1965) – Colonel Reed in S7:E25, "The Last Order"
- Empire (1962) - Dr. Karr
- The Munsters (1964) as director for episodes 1, 9, 10, and 13
- Do Not Go Gentle Into That Good Night (1967) - Dr. Gettlinger
- The Big Valley (1968) - Ben Dawes
- Star Trek: TOS (1969), one episode: "Charlie X"
- Mission Impossible (1971), one episode: "Kitara" - Colonel Alex Kohler
- The Streets of San Francisco (1972) - Gregory Praxas
- The Waltons (1972–1981), director for 16 episodes
- Sara (1976), as director of an episode
- The Life and Times of Grizzly Adams (1974–1978), created the title character for the 1974 film and the TV series
- Hawaii Five-O (S11, ep. 22: The Year of the Horse) as General Oban
- Knight Rider (1982) - 'Col. Alvin B. Kincaid' Episode: "Inside Out"
- Rock Hudson (1990) - director Raoul Walsh
- War and Remembrance (1989) - General George S. Patton
- L.A. Law (1990–1994) - Judge Saul Edelstein
- Matlock (TV series) (1991) - Marvin Shea
- Night Court (1991) - State Supreme Court Justice Welch
- Star Trek: The Next Generation (1991), one episode: "The Mind's Eye" - Klingon ambassador Kell
- NYPD Blue (2001) - Season 8, Episode 7, "In-Laws, Outlaws" - John Gilbert

=== Radio ===
- Escape (1947–1954)
- The Saint (1951) - Louie the cab driver
- The Adventures of Ellery Queen - Ellery Queen
- The New Adventures of Nero Wolfe (1950–1951) - Archie Goodwin
- Gunsmoke (1952–1961)
- Yours Truly, Johnny Dollar (1956–1960)
- Lux Radio Theater
- The Adventures of Philip Marlowe

=== Video game ===
- Tom Clancy's Rainbow Six: Rogue Spear (1999) - Lukyan (voice)
