= Nero Wolfe (1982 radio series) =

- Mavor Moore (Nero Wolfe) and Don Francks (Archie Goodwin)
- Other names: Rex Stout's Nero Wolfe
- Genre: Detective mystery
- Running time: 60 minutes
- Country of origin: Canada
- Language(s): English
- Syndicates: Canadian Broadcasting Corporation
- Starring: Mavor Moore; Don Francks; Cec Linder
- Created by: Rex Stout
- Written by: Ron Hartmann (adaptation)
- Directed by: Ron Hartmann
- Produced by: Ron Hartmann
- Original release: January 16 – April 10, 1982
- No. of episodes: 13

Nero Wolfe is a 1982 Canadian radio drama series adapted from the Nero Wolfe mysteries by Rex Stout. The series stars Mavor Moore as Nero Wolfe, and Don Francks as Wolfe's assistant Archie Goodwin. Thirteen hour-long episodes were presented by the Canadian Broadcasting Corporation.

== Production ==
In 1982, Canadian actor, producer, writer and cultural pioneer Mavor Moore starred as Nero Wolfe in the Canadian Broadcasting Corporation's 13-episode radio series Nero Wolfe, also known as Rex Stout's Nero Wolfe. Don Francks portrayed Wolfe's assistant and legman Archie Goodwin. The supporting cast included Cec Linder as Inspector Cramer, Frank Perry as Fritz Brenner, and Alfie Scopp as Saul Panzer.

Written, produced and directed by actor Ron Hartmann, the series was praised for its high production values and accurate presentation of Stout's original stories.

Fiona Reid, Jack Creley and Neil Munro were featured in the debut episode, "Disguise for Murder", broadcast January 16, 1982. Other repertory players in the series included Jackie Burroughs, Lally Cadeau, Jayne Eastwood, Brian George, Martha Gibson, Lynne Griffin, Barbara Hamilton, Patricia Hamilton, Helen Hughes, Charmion King, Budd Knapp, Maria Loma, Arch McDonnell, Meana E. Meana, Mary Peery, Eric Peterson, August Schellenberg, Ailine Seaton, Terry Tweed and Sandy Webster.

The final episode, "Murder Is No Joke", aired April 10, 1982. The series was released on audiocassette by Durkin Hayes Publishing (DH Audio).

== Episodes ==
#	Date	Program	Source	Notes
1	January 16, 1982	"Disguise for Murder"	1950 story	
2	January 23, 1982	"Before I Die"	1947 story	
3	January 30, 1982	"Counterfeit for Murder"	1961 story	
4	February 6, 1982	"The Cop Killer"	1951 story	
5	February 13, 1982	"Christmas Party"	1957 story	
6	February 20, 1982	"Cordially Invited to Meet Death"	1942 story	
7	February 27, 1982	"Man Alive"	1947 story	
8	March 6, 1982	"Instead of Evidence"	1946 story	
9	March 13, 1982	"Eeny Meeny Murder Mo"	1962 story	
10	March 20, 1982	"The Squirt and the Monkey"	1951 story	
11	March 27, 1982	"The Next Witness"	1955 story	
12	April 3, 1982	"Death of a Demon"	1955 story	
13	April 10, 1982	"Murder Is No Joke"	1958 story	

== See also ==
- The Adventures of Nero Wolfe, a 1943–44 ABC radio series starring Santos Ortega and Luis van Rooten
- The Amazing Nero Wolfe, a 1945 Mutual radio series starring Francis X. Bushman
- The New Adventures of Nero Wolfe, a 1950–51 NBC radio series starring Sydney Greenstreet
