= Lamont Johnson =

American actor

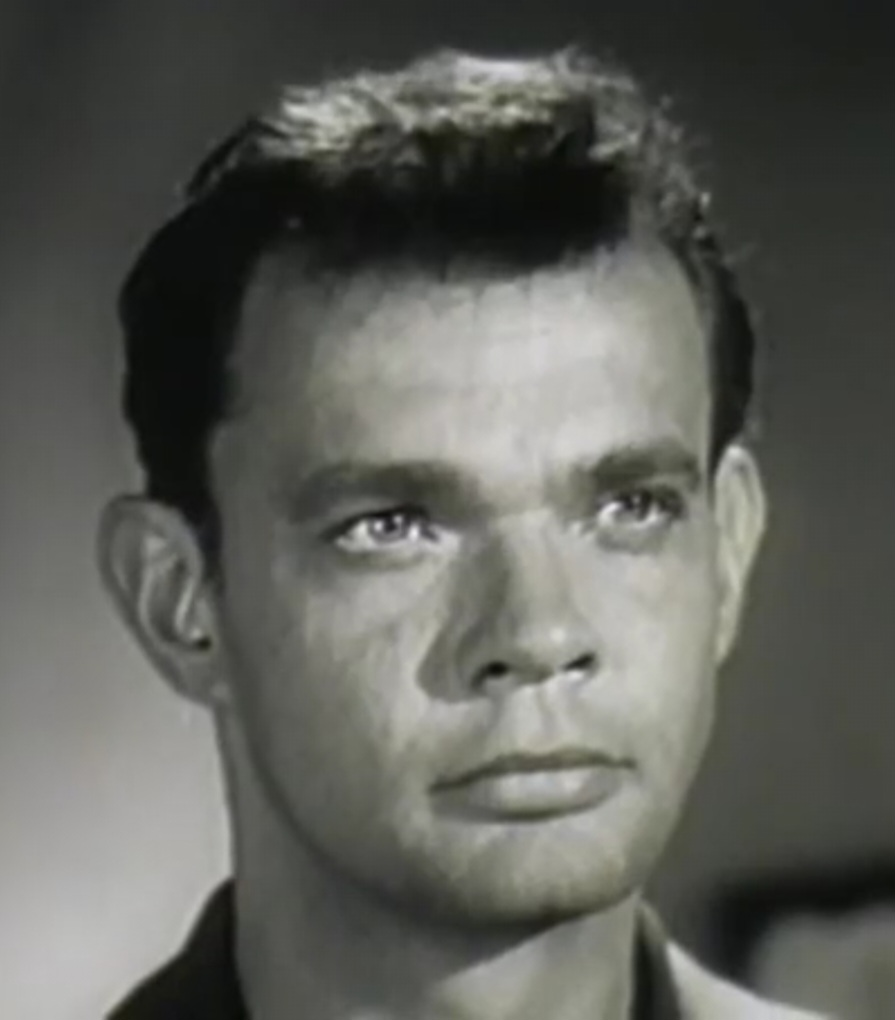
- Johnson in an episode of Treasury Men in Action (1955)
- Born: Ernest Lamont Johnson Jr. September 30, 1922; Stockton, California, U.S.
- Died: October 24, 2010 (aged 88); Monterey, California, U.S.
- Occupations: Actor, director
- Years active: 1951–2000
- Spouse: Toni Merrill (m. 1945)
- Children: 3
- Awards: DGA Award for Outstanding Directorial Achievement in Television for My Sweet Charlie (1970); Shared with Ralph Ferrin (assistant director) (plaque)

Ernest Lamont Johnson Jr. (September 30, 1922 – October 24, 2010) was an American actor and film director who appeared in and directed many television shows and movies. He won two Emmy Awards.

== Early years ==
Born in Stockton, California on September 30, 1922, Johnson was the only child of Altadena-based businessman Ernest Lamont Johnson and aspiring operatic contralto Ruth Alice (née Fairchild) Johnson. He attended Pasadena Junior College and UCLA and was active in theatrical productions at both schools.

== Acting ==
When he was 16, Johnson began his career in radio, eventually playing the role of Tarzan in a popular syndicated series in 1951. He also worked as a newscaster and a disc jockey. Johnson was also one of several actors to play Archie Goodwin in The New Adventures of Nero Wolfe, opposite Sydney Greenstreet on NBC Radio. He then turned to films and television, first as an actor, then as a director.

== Directing ==
Johnson's directing debut came in 1948 with the play Yes Is For a Very Young Man in New York. His television directing debut was on an episode of NBC Matinee Theater. Johnson also directed productions of the operas The Man in the Moon (1959), Iphigénie en Tauride (1962), and Orfeo (1990), and he directed an installment of the series Felicity plus the TV movie The Man Next Door (1996).

== Recognition ==
Johnson was nominated for nine Emmy Awards, winning twice, for Wallenberg: A Hero's Story (1985) and Lincoln (1988) — both for Outstanding Directing For A Miniseries Movie Or A Dramatic Special. He was nominated in the same category for Crash Landing: The Rescue of Flight 232 (1992), Unnatural Causes (1987), Ernie Kovacs: Between the Laughter (1984), Fear on Trial (1975), The Execution of Private Slovik (1974) and That Certain Summer (1972). His other Emmy nomination was for Outstanding Miniseries or Movie, also for Wallenberg: A Hero's Story.

Johnson won five Directors Guild of America Awards, winning in the category Movies for Television and Mini-Series for Lincoln (1988) and for That Certain Summer (1972). He also won DGA Awards for Most Outstanding TV Director (1972) and for Television — My Sweet Charlie (1970) and "Oscar Underwood Story": Profiles in Courage (1964). Additionally, he was nominated for DGA Awards for Movies for Television and Mini-Series for Wallenberg: A Hero's Story (1985), Fear on Trial (1975) and The Execution of Private Slovik (1974). Another DGA Award nomination was for Dramatic Series for Birdbath (1971).

== Personal life ==
Johnson married actress Toni Merrill in Paris in 1945. They had three children: Jeremy, Carolyn, and Christopher Anthony.

== Death ==
Johnson died of heart failure in Monterey, California, October 24, 2010.

== Filmography ==
=== Actor ===
- Up Front (1951) - Miller (uncredited)
- Retreat, Hell! (1952) - Captain 'Tink' O'Grady
- Sally and Saint Anne (1952) - Willie O'Moyne
- The Glory Brigade (1953) - Captain Adams (uncredited)
- Hallmark Hall of Fame (1954, TV Series)
- The Human Jungle (1954) - Detective Lannigan
- Goodyear Television Playhouse (1955, TV Series)
- Alfred Hitchcock Presents (1956) (Season 1 Episode 16: "You Got to Have Luck") - David Schaffner
- Please Murder Me (1956) - Carl Holt
- Crusader (1956, TV Series) - Lieutenant Joseph Balta
- The Brothers Rico (1957) - Peter Malaks
- Jet Pilot (1957) - Sergeant (uncredited)
- Alcoa Theatre (1959, TV Series) - Colonel von Schlabrendorff
- Angel (1961, TV Series) - Lazlo
- Blue Light (1966, Episode: "Jet Trail") - Colonel Von Kreuzer
- The Big Valley (1966, TV Series) - Anson Cross
- Felony Squad (1967, TV Series) - Colonel Bix Gabriel
- Gunsmoke (1967, TV Series) - Stoner
- The McKenzie Break (1970) - PT Boat Captain (uncredited)
- The Last American Hero (1973) - Hotel Desk Clerk (uncredited)
- One on One (1977) - Barry Brunz
- Shogun Assassin (1980) - (voice) (final film role)

=== Director ===
- Have Gun – Will Travel (1958-1959)
- Peter Gunn (1958-1959)
- Mr. Lucky (1959-1960)
- Naked City (1960)
- Dr. Kildare (1961-1963)
- The Twilight Zone (1961-1963)
- A Covenant with Death (1967)
- Kona Coast (1968)
- The Name of the Game (1968-1969)
- Judd for the Defense (1968)
- The McKenzie Break (1970)
- My Sweet Charlie (1970)
- A Gunfight (1971)
- The Groundstar Conspiracy (1972)
- That Certain Summer (1972)
- You'll Like My Mother (1972)
- The Last American Hero (1973)
- The Execution of Private Slovik (1974)
- Visit to a Chief's Son (1974)
- Fear on Trial (1975)
- Lipstick (1976)
- One on One (1977)
- Somebody Killed Her Husband (1978)
- Cattle Annie and Little Britches (1981)
- Crisis At Central High (1981)
- Escape from Iran: The Canadian Caper (1981)
- Spacehunter: Adventures in the Forbidden Zone (1983)
- Faerie Tale Theatre: Jack And The Beanstalk (1983)
- Ernie Kovacs: Between the Laughter (1984)
- Wallenberg: A Hero's Story (1985)
- Unnatural Causes (1986)
- Lincoln (1988)
- The Kennedys of Massachusetts (1990)
- Voices Within: The Lives of Truddi Chase (1990)
- A Thousand Heroes (1992)
- The Broken Chain (1993)
