= The New Adventures of Nero Wolfe =

American radio drama series (1950 to 1951)

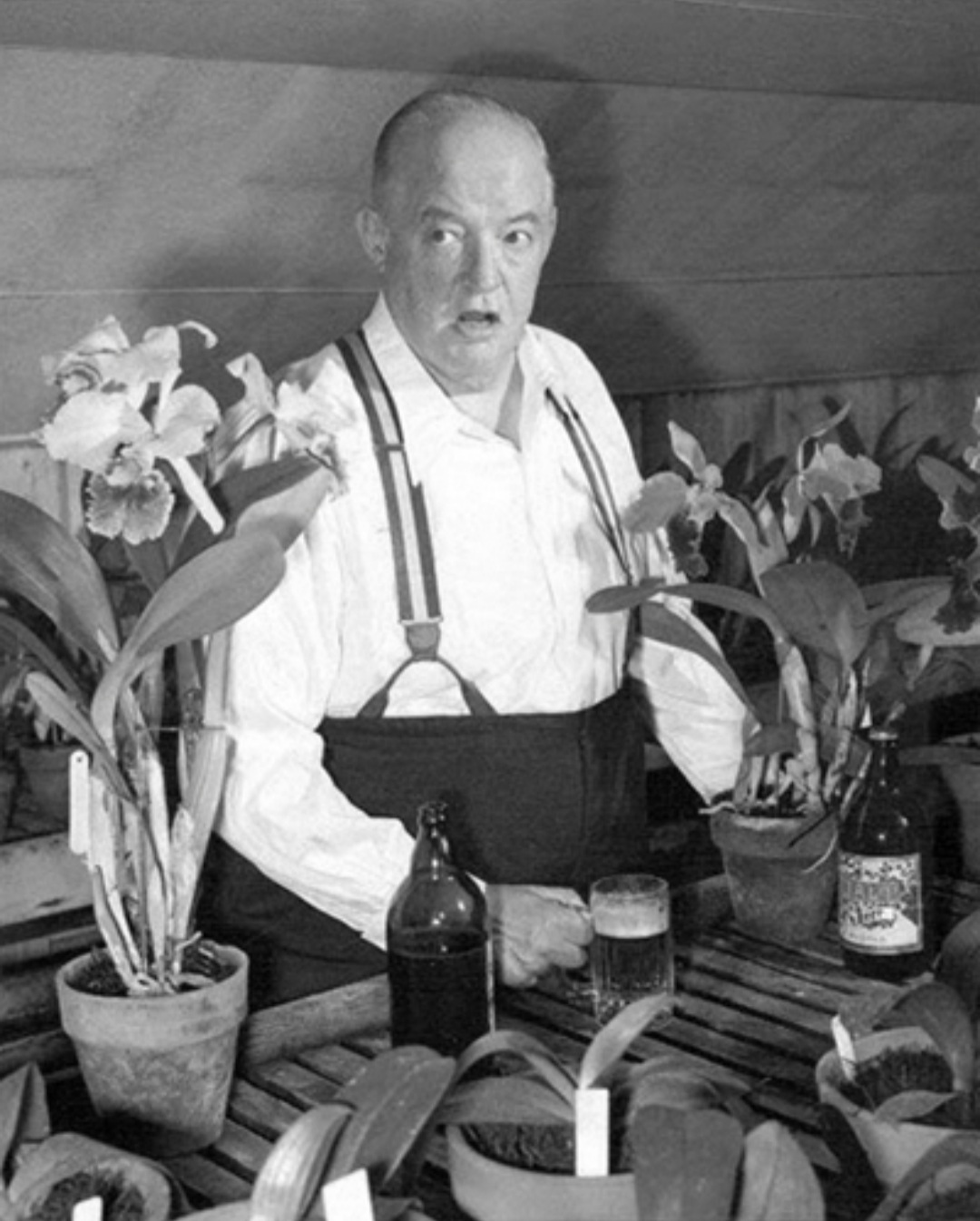
- Sydney Greenstreet as Nero Wolfe (1950)
- Genre: Detective mystery
- Running time: 30 minutes
- Country of origin: United States
- Language(s): English
- Syndicates: NBC
- Starring: Sydney Greenstreet
- Announcer: Don Stanley
- Created by: Rex Stout
- Written by: Alfred Bester and others
- Directed by: J. Donald Wilson
- Produced by: Edwin Fadiman
- Original release: October 20, 1950 – April 27, 1951
- No. of episodes: 26

The New Adventures of Nero Wolfe is a 1950–51 American radio drama series starring Sydney Greenstreet as Rex Stout's fictional armchair detective Nero Wolfe. Based on Stout's principal characters but not his stories, the series aired October 20, 1950 – April 27, 1951, on NBC. It is regarded as the series that is most responsible for popularizing Nero Wolfe on radio.

== Production ==
The New Adventures of Nero Wolfe stars Sydney Greenstreet as Rex Stout's fictional detective genius Nero Wolfe. Produced by Edwin Fadiman and directed by J. Donald Wilson, the series aired on NBC from October 20, 1950 to April 27, 1951. Don Stanley was the announcer. The episodes were written by Alfred Bester and others.

Wolfe's legman Archie Goodwin was played by a succession of actors including Gerald Mohr, Herb Ellis, Lawrence Dobkin, Harry Bartell, Lamont Johnson and Wally Maher.

Biographer John McAleer reported that Stout enjoyed Greenstreet's portrayal. The New Adventures of Nero Wolfe was the first radio series that, like the Nero Wolfe stories themselves, stressed characterization over plot. It is regarded as the series that is most responsible for popularizing Nero Wolfe on radio. All but one episode ("The Case of the Headless Hunter") has survived in radio collections.

Greenstreet suffered from both diabetes and Bright's Disease, and his health fluctuated during the run of the radio program.

== Cast ==
- Sidney Greenstreet as Nero Wolfe
- Wally Maher as Archie Goodwin (Episode 1)
- Lamont Johnson as Archie Goodwin (Episode 2)
- Herb Ellis as Archie Goodwin (Episode 3-4)
- Larry Dobkin as Archie Goodwin (Episode 5-12)
- Gerald Mohr as Archie Goodwin (Episode 13-16)
- Harry Bartell as Archie Goodwin (Episode 17-26)
- Bill Johnstone as Inspector Cramer

== Episodes ==
#	Date	Program	Notes
1	October 20, 1950	"Stamped for Murder"	
2	October 27, 1950	"The Case of the Careworn Cuff"	
3	November 3, 1950	"The Case of the Dear, Dead Lady"	
4	November 10, 1950	"The Case of the Headless Hunter"	
5	November 17, 1950	"The Case of the Careless Cleaner"	
6	November 24, 1950	"The Case of the Beautiful Archer"	
7	December 1, 1950	"The Case of the Friendly Rabbit"	
8	December 8, 1950	"The Case of the Impolite Corpse"	
9	December 15, 1950	"The Case of the Girl Who Cried Wolfe"	
10	December 22, 1950	"The Case of the Slaughtered Santas"	
11	December 29, 1950	"The Case of the Bashful Body"	
12	January 5, 1951	"The Case of the Deadly Sell-Out"	
13	January 12, 1951	"The Case of the Killer Cards"	
14	January 19, 1951	"The Case of the Calculated Risk"	
15	January 26, 1951	"The Case of the Phantom Fingers"	
16	February 2, 1951	"The Case of the Vanishing Shells"	
17	February 16, 1951	"The Case of the Party for Death"	
18	February 23, 1951	"The Case of the Malevolent Medic"	
19	March 2, 1951	"The Case of the Hasty Will"	
20	March 9, 1951	"The Case of the Disappearing Diamonds"	
21	March 16, 1951	"The Case of the Midnight Ride"	
22	March 23, 1951	"The Case of the Final Page"	
23	March 30, 1951	"The Case of the Tell-Tale Ribbon"	
24	April 6, 1951	"The Case of the Shot in the Dark"	Also known as "A Slight Case of Perjury"
25	April 20, 1951	"The Case of the Lost Heir"	
26	April 27, 1951	"The Case of Room 304"	Finale

== See also ==
- The Adventures of Nero Wolfe, a 1943–44 ABC radio series starring Santos Ortega and Luis van Rooten
- The Amazing Nero Wolfe, a 1945 Mutual radio series starring Francis X. Bushman
- Nero Wolfe (1982 radio series), a 1982 Canadian Broadcasting Corporation radio series starring Mavor Moore
