= Fear on Trial =

1975 film by Lamont Johnson

- Title card
- Genre: Drama; History
- Based on: Fear on Trial by John Henry Faulk
- Written by: David W. Rintels
- Directed by: Lamont Johnson
- Starring: George C. Scott; William Devane
- Country of origin: United States
- Original language: English

Production
- Executive producers: Alan Landsburg; Laurence D. Savadove
- Producer: Stanley Chase
- Cinematography: Bill Butler
- Editor: Tom Rolf
- Running time: 100 minutes
- Production company: Alan Landsburg Productions

Original release
- Network: CBS
- Release: October 2, 1975

Fear on Trial is a 1975 American television film about the blacklisting of 1950s broadcast personality John Henry Faulk, based on Faulk's 1964 memoir of the same title. It was directed by Lamont Johnson.

== Cast ==
- George C. Scott as Louis Nizer
- William Devane as John Henry Faulk
- Dorothy Tristan as Laura Faulk (based on Lynn Faulk: the opening credits note "The character of Mrs. John Henry Faulk has been fictionalized for dramatic purposes.")
- William Redfield as Stan Hopp
- Milt Kogan as Herb Steinmann
- Allan Miller as Gerry Dickler
- Ben Piazza as Harry
- John Harkins as Vincent Hartnett
- John McMartin as Tom Murray
- Lois Nettleton as Nan Claybourne (based on Kim Hunter)
- John Houseman as Mike Collins
- Judd Hirsch as Saul
- Bruce Geller as Judge Abraham Geller (Bruce Geller's father and the actual trial judge)
- Mark Goodson as Himself (Goodson was a real witness for Faulk's side in the trial)
