= Blackstone Plantation =

1929-1934 old-time radio musical variety program

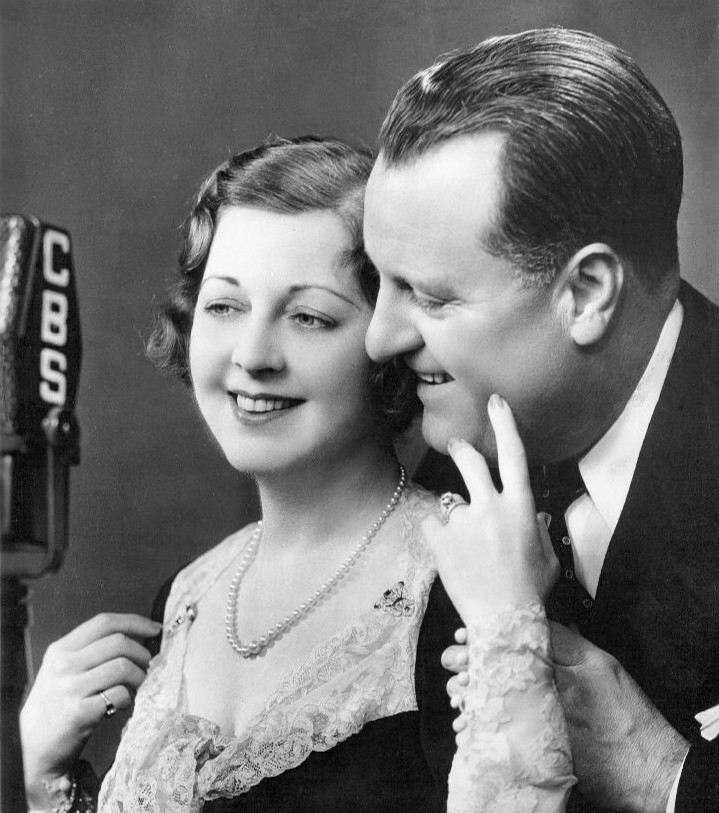
- Julia Sanderson and Frank Crumit starred in Blackstone Plantation.
- Country of origin: United States
- Language: English
- Starring: Frank Crumit; Julia Sanderson
- Announcer: Ed Herlihy
- Produced by: Frank Vallan
- Original release: 1929 – January 2, 1934

Blackstone Plantation is an old-time radio musical variety program in the United States. It was broadcast on CBS (1929–1930) and on NBC (1930–1934). The program was one of NBC's top-rated programs in 1932.

== Personnel ==
Frank Crumit and Julia Sanderson, a husband-and-wife team who had been headliners in vaudeville, were hosts for the show. Alfred Swenson played Captain Blackstone, Santos Ortega played Don Rodrigo, and Ted de Corsia played Don Philippe. The program also featured guest stars such as Lanny Ross and Parker Fennelly.

Ed Herlihy was the program's announcer, and Jack Shilkret's orchestra provided music.

Frank Vallan was the producer when the program was on CBS.

== Format ==
The book Vaudeville old & new: an encyclopedia of variety performances in America summarized the program as follows: "The two stars sang and exchanged banter. Music and gab with guests in their breezy and humorous style characterized their programs." The show was sponsored by Blackstone cigars.
