= The Adventures of Nero Wolfe =

Radio drama in the United States of America

- Genre: Detective mystery
- Running time: 30 minutes
- Country of origin: United States
- Language(s): English
- Syndicates: New England Network (April 10–June 26, 1944); Blue Network – ABC (July 5, 1943–July 14, 1944)
- Starring: J. B. Williams; Santos Ortega; Luis Van Rooten; Joseph Julian; John Gibson
- Created by: Rex Stout
- Written by: Louis Vittes
- Produced by: Himan Brown
- Original release: April 10, 1943 – July 14, 1944
- No. of episodes: 51

The Adventures of Nero Wolfe is a 1943–44 American radio drama series produced by Himan Brown and featuring Rex Stout's fictional detective. Three actors portrayed Nero Wolfe over the course of the series. J. B. Williams starred in its first incarnation, beginning April 10, 1943, on the regional New England Network. Santos Ortega assumed the role when the suspense drama moved to ABC on July 5, 1943, and continued as Wolfe until sometime in 1944 when he was succeeded by Luis Van Rooten. Archie Goodwin, Wolfe's assistant and legman, was played by Joseph Julian and John Gibson. Based on Stout's principal characters but not his stories, the series ended with the broadcast July 14, 1944.

== Production ==
Producer Himan Brown persuaded Rex Stout to agree to a Nero Wolfe radio series, for which the author received a weekly royalty for the use of his characters. Louis Vittes wrote most of the scripts for the 30-minute episodes, basing none of them on Stout's original stories.

The Adventures of Nero Wolfe began on the regional New England Network April 10–June 25, 1943, with J. B. Williams starring as Rex Stout's armchair detective, Nero Wolfe. After a three-month trial run the show moved to the Blue Network, which soon became ABC. Santos Ortega starred in the weekly suspense drama, which aired July 5–September 27, 1943. Wolfe's assistant, Archie Goodwin, was played by John Gibson and Joseph Julian.

Following a four-month hiatus for the network's winter programming, The Adventures of Nero Wolfe resumed January 21, 1944, with Ortega and Julian continuing as Wolfe and Archie. Ortega was succeeded sometime during that year by Luis van Rooten.

Although the show was a success, disagreements between Brown and Stout's representative, Edwin Fadiman, led to the series ending after the broadcast July 14, 1944.

== Episodes ==
=== New England Network ===
No episodes of the New England Network trial run of The Adventures of Nero Wolfe are in circulation. Twelve episodes aired weekly April 10–June 26, 1943. No titles are available.

=== Blue Network – ABC ===
Only one episode of the Blue Network – ABC run of The Adventures of Nero Wolfe is in circulation, an episode that was chosen for rebroadcast by the Armed Forces Radio Service's Mystery Playhouse series. The announcer for "The Last Laugh Murder Case" (July 14, 1944) was Peter Lorre.

#	Date	Program	Notes
1	July 5, 1943	"The Case of the Bloodstained Orchid"	
2	July 12, 1943	"The Case of the Spoiled Broth"	
3	July 19, 1943	"The Case of the Vacant Blonde"	
4	July 26, 1943	"The Case of the Noisy Ghost"	
5	August 2, 1943	"The Case of the Deadly Million"	
6	August 9, 1943	"The Case of the Stuttering Records"	
7	August 16, 1943	"Death Played a Dummy"	
8	August 23, 1943	"The Case of the Departed Guest"	
9	August 30, 1943	"The Case of the Murderous Signature"	
10	September 6, 1943	"The Case of the Allergic Blonde"	
11	September 13, 1943	"The Case of the Plastered Bride"	
12	September 20, 1943	"The Case of the Missing Mind"	
13	September 27, 1943	"The Case of the Red-Headed Baby"	
14	January 21, 1944	"The Case of the Mountain That Came to Mohamet"	
15	January 28, 1944	"The Case of the Traveling Pajamas"	
16	February 4, 1944	Title unknown	
17	February 11, 1944	"The Case of the Superfluous Husband"	
18	February 18, 1944	"The Case of the Princess Charming"	
19	February 25, 1944	"The Case of the Bewildered Brothers"	
20	March 3, 1944	"The Case of the Two-Headed Doll	
21	March 10, 1944	Title unknown	
22	March 17, 1944	"The Case of the Wandering Wife"	
23	March 24, 1944	"The Case of the Passionate Pigeon"	
24	March 31, 1944	Title unknown	
25	April 7, 1944	"The Case of the Tattooed Terror"	
26	April 14, 1944	"The Case of the Lonely Corpse"	
27	April 21, 1944	"The Case of the Coy Cadaver"	
28	April 28, 1944	"The Case of the Dying Portrait"	
29	May 5, 1944	"The Case of the Million Dollar Baby"	
30	May 12, 1944	"The Case of the Tenth Tornado"	
31	May 19, 1944	"The Case of the Burning Book"	
32	May 26, 1944	"The Case of the Wrong Leg Murder"	
33	June 2, 1944	"The Case of the Invisible Murders"	
34	June 9, 1944	Title unknown	
35	June 16, 1944	Title unknown	
36	June 23, 1944	Title unknown	
37	June 30, 1944	Title unknown	
38	July 7, 1944	Title unknown	
39	July 14, 1944	"The Last Laugh Murder Case"	Finale

== See also ==
- The Amazing Nero Wolfe, a 1945 Mutual radio series starring Francis X. Bushman
- The New Adventures of Nero Wolfe, a 1950–51 NBC radio series starring Sydney Greenstreet
- Nero Wolfe (1982 radio series), a 1982 Canadian Broadcasting Corporation radio series starring Mavor Moore
