= Hannibal Cobb =

American old-time radio detective drama

- Genre: Detective drama
- Country of origin: United States
- Language: English
- Syndicates: ABC
- Starring: Santos Ortega
- Announcer: Les Griffith
- Written by: Bernard Dougall; Louis Heyward; Ira Marion; Lillian Schoen
- Directed by: Martin Andrews; William D. Hamilton; Roy LaPlante; Charles Powers
- Produced by: Martin Andrews; William D. Hamilton; Roy LaPlante; Charles Powers
- Original release: January 9, 1950 – May 11, 1951

Hannibal Cobb is an American old-time radio detective drama. It was broadcast on ABC from January 9, 1950 until May 11, 1951.

== Format ==
Hannibal Cobb was a detective who "took an intense personal interest in those for whom he worked." Described at the beginning of each episode as "... a dramatic story of human conflict vividly told ...", Cobb's adventures were reported from the client's viewpoint.

In a radio version of counterprogramming, the program was unique in that it was broadcast in the daytime, when competing networks aired soap operas. In a January 6, 1950, article in The Cincinnati Enquirer, Lane Adams called the scheduling "almost a revolutionary break with hallowed radio precedent."

Hannibal Cobb was based on the Photocrime feature that ran in Look magazine.

== Personnel ==
Santos Ortega portrayed Hannibal Cobb, and Les Griffith was the announcer. Producer/directors were Martin Andrews, William D. Hamilton, Roy LaPlante, and Charles Powers. Writers were Bernard Dougall, Louis Heyward, Ira Marion, and Lillian Schoen.

== Television ==
In 1960, Filmmaster produced a series of 5-minute episodes of a Hannibal Cobb series that starred James Craig. The Video International Productions series was expected to have at least 189 episodes.
