= Archie Goodwin (character) =

Fictional detective created by Rex Stout

- Archie Goodwin meets Flora Gallant in part one of Rex Stout's "Frame-Up for Murder" illustrated by Austin Briggs for The Saturday Evening Post (June 21, 1958)
- First appearance: Fer-de-Lance (1934)
- Created by: Rex Stout

In-universe information
- Gender: Male
- Occupation: Private detective
- Nationality: American

Archie Goodwin is a fictional character in a series of detective stories and novels by American author Rex Stout. Archie is the witty narrator of the cases featuring his boss, Nero Wolfe, from 1934 (Fer-de-Lance) to 1975 (A Family Affair). His job title is Wolfe's confidential assistant and he also acts as secretary and chauffeur, yet Archie is effectively Wolfe's partner in the detective business. The stories often contrast his streetwise persona with Wolfe's aristocratic intelligence.

== Character ==
I know pretty well what my field is. Aside from my primary function as the thorn in the seat of Wolfe's chair to keep him from going to sleep and waking up only for meals, I'm chiefly cut out for two things: to jump and grab something before the other guy can get his paws on it, and to collect pieces of the puzzle for Wolfe to work on. — Archie Goodwin (1937)

Archie is Wolfe's live-in assistant in the private investigation business Wolfe runs out of his comfortable and luxurious New York City brownstone house on West 35th Street. Wolfe rarely leaves the brownstone – and makes it a special point to never leave the house for reasons concerning his work – so Archie does most of the actual investigating, followed by reporting his findings to Wolfe, who solves the mystery. Archie is a skilled observer and has trained his memory so that he can make verbatim reports, oral or typewritten, of extended conversations. He claims to be able to type 6 to 7 pages per hour on average, or up to 10 when he needs to hurry. Because Wolfe is generally ignorant of the logistical details of the world outside his house (and uninterested in them) he relies on Archie for various kinds of practical information and opinions. Wolfe also turns to Archie for personal judgments regarding the character of the women connected with a case, as Wolfe is wary of women and tends to keep them at arms-length.

I am just under six feet and weigh a hundred and eighty and therefore could not be called little. — Archie Goodwin

Archie's bedroom is on the third floor of the brownstone, and he owns all of the furniture within it. Under his bed is a gong that is part of an alarm system designed to sound if anyone gets too close to Wolfe's bedroom door or windows at night. He typically eats his breakfast in the kitchen, and lunch and dinner in the dining room with Wolfe. However, if he must hurry to keep an appointment, he will eat in the kitchen or at a restaurant because Wolfe hates to see anyone rush through a meal.

In addition to detective work, Archie also handles Wolfe's bookkeeping and banking, types his correspondence, and keeps the germination and other records for the orchids Wolfe raises as a hobby. His salary was $200 per week, but later it is $400 per week. Archie's hobbies include dancing (usually at the Flamingo), poker, and baseball. He was a fan of the New York Giants until they relocated to San Francisco in 1957, then later became a fan of the New York Mets when that team was founded in 1962. When moving around Manhattan on business, he often prefers to walk rather than using Wolfe's car or taking taxis. Unlike his employer, Archie has only two conspicuous eccentricities: His favorite drink is milk, and he always knows the exact time.

Archie's conversations with other characters often feature his penchant for arch wit, which can serve purposes such as playing devil's advocate to "badger" Wolfe into working; stalling or goading police officers; issuing threats under the guise of ironically ingenuous observations; or charming female characters into cooperating with Wolfe's professional desiderata.

Regardless of what year the story takes place, Archie and the other principal characters in the corpus do not age. Archie is in his early 30s. (Note: Rex Stout prepared a confidential memo dated 14 September 1949, providing physical descriptions of Archie and Wolfe. Under the heading Description of Archie Goodwin, Stout begins: Height 6 feet. Weight 180 lbs. Age 32. When he was later asked by biographer John J. McAleer at what age Archie was fixed in his own mind, Rex Stout replied, "I like 34.") (Note: Archie's conversation with Cynthia Nieder in "Man Alive" sets his age as 32.) He was born on October 23 (Note: Describing his new wallet, Archie writes "Wolfe had given it to me on October 23, at the dinner-table, and I didn't even know he knew when my birthday was.") in Chillicothe, Ohio. At age 12 he lived in Zanesville. Archie once mentions a sister in Ohio (who sent him silk pajamas for his birthday).

Rex Stout was never overly concerned with consistency in the Wolfe books, and Archie himself comfortably relates unreliable information as it came during the course of the story, so some specifics of Archie's background vary in the corpus. In Fer-de-Lance, he comments that his parents died when he was a child, but in The Final Deduction his mother is still living.

The most concentrated – but suspect – biography of Archie comes from Too Many Women, in which Mrs. Jasper Pine has his background investigated. The details she relates are contradicted in other stories. She tells Archie that his father's name is James Arner Goodwin (Note: In Some Buried Caesar Archie himself implies that his father's name was Titus, when he tells Lily Rowan to use the name Mrs. Titus Goodwin while asking her to call Wolfe, pretending to be his mother.) that his mother's maiden name is Leslie, that he has two brothers and two sisters, and that he was born in Canton, Ohio. Archie never mentions the alleged brothers and second sister in the series. (Note: "Rex thought Mrs. Pine – who was the kind of person who supposes money can buy anything – got what she deserved", wrote Stout's authorized biographer John J. McAleer. He quotes Stout: "Of course Archie was born in Chillicothe. I don't know how he got Mrs. Pine's dick misinformed.") (Note: Goodwin himself brings up his birthplace “Wait till you see Chillicothe, Ohio, where I was born.”)

Although he is from the American Midwest, Archie has the ‘street smarts’ to handle just about any situation he finds himself in, and he knows New York City like the back of his hand. Though he freely admits that there is no one better than Saul Panzer in many aspects of investigative work, such as remembering faces and tailing people, Goodwin is one of the most competent private detectives in the city.

When Wolfe disappears for an extended period in In the Best Families, Archie rents an office of his own and works as an independent detective. During this time, Archie writes, "My idea was to net more per week than I had been getting from Wolfe, not that I cared for the money, but as a matter of principle." Later, Archie needles Wolfe, pointing out that he made a little more than double the amount that Wolfe had been paying him; Wolfe claims not to believe it.

Archie has a long-time cordial and intimate relationship with Lily Rowan, a wealthy society woman. However, they do not try to limit each other's social lives, and Archie has many passing love interests throughout the series. When meeting a woman he considers particularly beautiful, Archie often facetiously expresses a desire to propose marriage. The only serious affair apart from Lily that he shares with the reader is Lucy Valdon, with whom he has a series of extended assignations during The Mother Hunt, prompting Wolfe and Fritz to fear that Archie may finally settle down. This does not happen, and Lucy Valdon did not appear in any other story although she receives a mention in A Right to Die.

== As narrator ==
Archie, as Stout's first-person narrator, faithfully relates each case in the past tense in meticulous detail. His narrative includes his own thoughts over the course of the story, from ruminations on the case in progress to personal impressions of and opinions about the people involved. He is very thorough in describing the details of other characters' physical appearances, often adding his own positive or negative judgments.

Because Wolfe routinely keeps Archie in the dark about certain key insights and key tasks assigned to other operatives, Archie's openness with the reader over the course of the story he is telling from his own point of view does not risk giving away the solution prior to Wolfe's climactic revelations. (However, despite his candor toward the reader, Archie occasionally discloses that he's holding back some particularly private thought or event.)

From time to time Archie acknowledges the reader directly, by speculating as to whether we will be interested in this or that detail, showing us supposed copies of vital documents when the originals are no longer accessible to him at the time he is writing, or discussing whether we might have figured something out yet at a certain point in the narrative. He occasionally expresses mild concern that another character, such as Wolfe or Inspector Cramer, may read his account of the case and take offense at something he has written.

Archie's narratorial wittiness includes a repeatedly employed callback maneuver whereby he quotes a character using a striking or unusual turn of phrase, and then later uses the phrase himself, in some other context, in the course of his narration.

== Portrayals ==
Timothy Hutton portrayed Archie Goodwin in A&E TV's A Nero Wolfe Mystery

- Lionel Stander in the Columbia Pictures films Meet Nero Wolfe (1936) and The League of Frightened Men (1937)
- John Gibson and Joseph Julian in the 1943–44 radio series The Adventures of Nero Wolfe
- Elliott Lewis in the 1945 radio series The Amazing Nero Wolfe
- Gerald Mohr, Herb Ellis, Lawrence Dobkin, Harry Bartell, Lamont Johnson and Wally Maher in the 1950–51 radio series The New Adventures of Nero Wolfe
- Gene Reynolds in the 1956 Omnibus TV series episode, "The Fine Art of Murder"
- William Shatner in the aborted 1959 CBS-TV series Nero Wolfe
- Joachim Fuchsberger in the 1961 German TV movie Zu viele Köche
- Paolo Ferrari in the 1969–1971 Italian TV series
- Tom Mason in the 1977 TV movie Nero Wolfe
- Lee Horsley in the 1981 TV series Nero Wolfe
- Don Francks in the 1982 Canadian radio series Nero Wolfe
- Timothy Hutton in the A&E TV movie The Golden Spiders: A Nero Wolfe Mystery (2000)
- Sergey Zhigunov in the 2001–2002 Russian TV movies
- Timothy Hutton in the 2001–2002 A&E TV series A Nero Wolfe Mystery
- Pietro Sermonti in the 2012 Italian TV series

== Influence ==
- The character of Lord Bontriomphe from Randall Garrett's Too Many Magicians is based on Archie Goodwin. Lord Bontriomphe – the name means "good win" in French – is London's Special Investigator who uses his "flair for narrative and an eidetic memory" to collect information as the "eyes and ears" for his superior.
- In the Bernie Rhodenbarr series by Lawrence Block, Bernie's friend Carolyn Kaiser owns a cat named Archie Goodwin, named after the detective.
