= Stroke of Fate =

1953 American radio drama

Stroke of Fate was an American radio drama, originally aired in 1953.

This NBC Radio alternate history series aired 13 episodes from October 4 to December 27, 1953, featuring actors such as Ed Begley, Alexander Scourby, Hal Studer, and Santos Ortega. The episodes were written by Mort Lewis and George Faulkner, directed by Fred Weihe, and announced by Lionel Ricco. The 30-minute episodes initially aired Sunday nights at 9:00 pm ET, before moving to 9:30 on November 8th. Each episode had an alternate history point of divergence and dramatized the results of that change.

Air date	Title	Point of divergence
October 4	"Robert E. Lee"	At Winfield Scott's request, Lee becomes General of the United States Army at the beginning of the Civil War, instead of later leading the Confederacy's.
October 11	"The Earl of Essex"	Robert Devereux succeeds in overthrowing Elizabeth I of England.
October 18	"The Burr-Hamilton Duel"	During the Hamilton-Burr duel, Alexander Hamilton shot and killed Aaron Burr.
October 25	"Escape of Marie Antoinette"	Marie Antoinette flees Paris during the French Revolution, and is not guillotined.
November 1	"Lincoln's Consular Service"	Abraham Lincoln obtains the consular job he wanted in 1841, which does not result in him becoming President.
November 8	"Benedict Arnold"	Benedict Arnold manages to hand West Point over to the British in the American Revolution.
November 15	"Caesar and Cleopatra"	Julius Caesar weds Cleopatra VII of Egypt in 50 BCE.
November 22	"Germany Invades-Rhineland"	France uses military force to oppose Hitler's occupation of the Rhineland in 1936.
November 29	"Battle of Quebec"	The French win the Battle of the Plains of Abraham in 1759, and retain Quebec.
December 6	"Our Neighbor in Alaska"	Russia does not sell Alaska to the United States in 1867.
December 13	"Alexander the Great"	Alexander the Great survives his illness in 323 BCE and continues his conquest of Asia.
December 20	"America's First Secret Weapon"	David Bushnell's submarine, the Turtle, is used successfully to sink and destroy British ships in the American Revolution.
December 27	"Norman Conquest of England"	The Normans fail to conquer England in 1066.

All of the episodes have survived.

== Bibliography ==
- Dunning, John (1998). On the Air: The Encyclopedia of Old-Time Radio. Oxford University Press. ISBN 0-19-507678-8.
