= The Eddie Bracken Show =

American old-time radio situation comedy

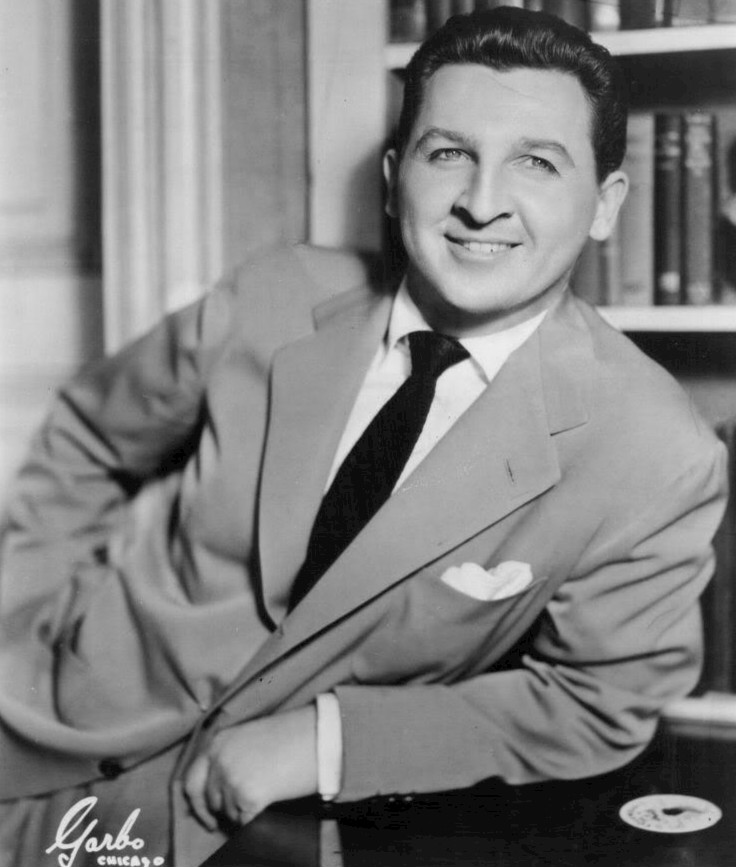
- Eddie Bracken
- Genre: Situation comedy
- Running time: 30 minutes
- Country of origin: United States
- Language: English
- Syndicates: NBC (1945); CBS (1946-1947)
- Starring: Eddie Bracken
- Announcer: John Wald (NBC); Jimmy Wallington (CBS)
- Written by: Robert Riley Crutcher (NBC); George Hope (CBS)
- Directed by: Nat Wolff
- Produced by: Mann Holiner
- Original release: January 28, 1945 – March 23, 1947
- Sponsored by: Standard Brands (NBC); Texaco (CBS)

The Eddie Bracken Show is an American old-time radio situation comedy. It was broadcast on NBC from January 28, 1945, to May 27, 1945, and on CBS from September 29, 1946, to March 23, 1947.

== Format ==
Eddie Bracken played himself in this situation comedy. Radio historian John Dunning described Bracken's role as that of "the same sad bumpkin of his hit films, the eternal helper who always managed to leave a situation more muddled than he found it." Vincent Terrace, in Radio Programs, 1924-1984: A Catalog of More Than 1800 Shows, wrote: "Eddie Bracken is a well-intentioned young man with one serious drawback: He is calamity prone and his efforts to undo the chaotic situation he creates by trying to help others is the focal point of the stories."

== Characters and Cast ==
In addition to Bracken, characters in the program and the actors who portrayed them included Ann Rutherford as Connie Monahan (Bracken's girlfriend), William Demarest as Connie's father, Janet Waldo as another girlfriend, and Jim Bannon as the narrator. Those in supporting roles included Cathy Lewis, Wally Maher, Edwin Cooper, Irene Ryan, Jack Morton, Alan Bridge, Ruth Perrott, and Clem McCarthy. John Wald was the announcer on the NBC broadcasts, and Jimmy Wallington had that role on those on CBS. Music was by Leigh Harline and Paul J. Smith.

Nat Wolff was the show's director. Robert Riley Crutcher wrote for the NBC version, and George Hope wrote for the one on CBS. Mann Holiner was the producer.

== Sponsors ==
The NBC version was sponsored by Standard Brands, and Texaco sponsored the episodes on CBS.
