= Lonesome Lenny =

1946 film by Tex Avery

- Directed by: Tex Avery
- Story by: Heck Allen
- Produced by: Fred Quimby (uncredited)
- Starring: Wally Maher; Tex Avery; Sara Berner (all uncredited)
- Music by: Scott Bradley
- Animation by: Preston Blair; Ed Love; Ray Abrams; Walter Clinton
- Backgrounds by: John Didrik Johnsen (uncredited)
- Color process: Technicolor
- Production company: MGM cartoon studio
- Distributed by: Metro-Goldwyn-Mayer
- Release date: March 9, 1946
- Running time: 8 minutes
- Language: English

Lonesome Lenny is a 1946 Screwy Squirrel cartoon directed by Tex Avery and released to theaters on March 9, 1946 by Metro-Goldwyn-Mayer. It is the last Screwy Squirrel cartoon; he is "killed" off on-screen at the end of the short.

== Plot ==
Screwy Squirrel becomes the playmate of a lonesome, dopey, and strong dog Lenny, in a broad parody of John Steinbeck's "Of Mice and Men".

== Voice cast ==
- Wally Maher as Screwy Squirrel and Pet Store Owner (uncredited)
- Tex Avery as Lenny the Dog (uncredited)
- Sara Berner as Lady (uncredited)

== Home media ==
DVD

- The Katharine Hepburn Collection

Blu-ray

- Tex Avery Screwball Classics Volume 1
