= Tommy Riggs and Betty Lou =

American radio program (1938–1946)

- Genre: Comedy-variety
- Country of origin: United States
- Language: English
- Syndicates: NBC, CBS
- Starring: Tommy Riggs, Bert Wheeler, Dick Wheeler, Hank Ladd, Wally Maher
- Announcer: Ben Gage
- Written by: Sam Moore; Robert Brewster; Jack Douglas
- Original release: 1938 – 1946

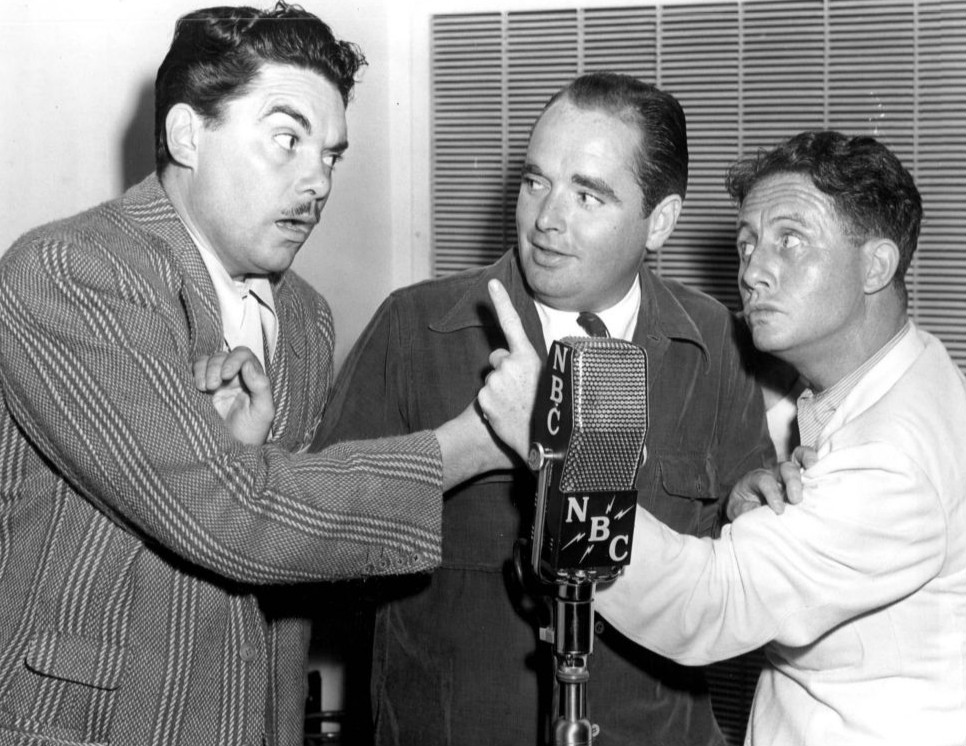
Tommy Riggs (center) with Hank Ladd (left) and Bert Wheeler as they joined the show's cast in 1941.

Tommy Riggs and Betty Lou was a radio situation comedy broadcast from 1938 to 1946. Both characters were voiced by Tommy Riggs.

== Tommy Riggs ==
Tommy Riggs was born October 21, 1908, in Pittsburgh, Pennsylvania. In 1931, he ran a poultry business and also served as a pianist-vocalist for WCAE in Pittsburgh. Riggs's show Tommy Riggs and Betty Lou began at this station in 1937. Riggs had a final run on CBS in the summer of 1946, after which returned to Pittsburgh, where he died in 1967.

=== Physical characteristics ===
Riggs consulted with doctors at Cornell Medical College to determine how he was able to do Betty Lou's voice. They told him his throat muscles were unusually large and strong—the strongest they had seen, causing the unusual condition.

== The show ==
Tommy Riggs switched back and forth from his natural baritone to the voice of a seven-year-old girl, Betty Lou. These dialogues found a shape in later episodes when the character of Betty Lou Barrie was established as Riggs' niece.

When station manager J.L. Coffin heard Riggs' little girl voice, he put The Tom and Betty Program on WCAE's schedule, and Riggs later moved on to KDKA (Pittsburgh), WTAM (Cleveland) and, in 1937, WLW (Cincinnati), where Harry Frankel (a.k.a. Singin' Sam) called a New York agent. An audition in New York led to a transcribed series for Chevrolet, and after Rudy Vallée heard the Chevrolet show, Riggs' agent told him he had two days to get ready for an appearance on Vallée's Royal Gelatin Hour. Vallée signed him for a 13-week contract. The audience reaction was strong: Riggs wound up spending a record 49 weeks on the Vallee show, catapulting him to fame and his own program.

The cast included Bert Wheeler, Hank Ladd, and Dick Wheeler. Ben Gage was the announcer, and Victor Young was musical director. Anita Ellis was the program's vocalist. Sam Moore and Robert Brewster were writer and producer, respectively.

It was one of the earliest shows scripted by comedy writer, comedian and bestselling author Jack Douglas. Despite the contributions of Douglas, Riggs never attained a level equal to that of Fanny Brice, famed for her Baby Snooks character. In the 1940s, Riggs faded as the popularity of Edgar Bergen (whose Charlie McCarthy character was inevitably compared to Betty Lou) expanded. Tommy Riggs and Betty Lou ran from 1938 to 1940 on NBC, then returned for the summer of 1942 on CBS, after which was picked up for a single season on NBC in 1942–43. Riggs then joined the Navy, taking Betty Lou to Allied camps in the Far East for 18 months; when he returned, radio audiences had largely forgotten him.

=== Legacy ===
Tommy Riggs and Betty Lou was awarded a star on the Hollywood Walk of Fame. The star is one of only two to list an honoree alongside a fictional character; the other is Clayton Moore and the Lone Ranger.

Wally Maher played the character Wilbur on Tommy Riggs and Betty Lou and later used the same voice, mannerisms and catchphrases ("I like him, he's silly") when voicing Screwy Squirrel in Tex Avery's short-lived animated series of the same name.
