= Mystery Playhouse =

Mystery Playhouse is an American radio drama hosted by Peter Lorre which aired on the American Forces Network from July 1944 to June 1946.

The series aired during World War II specifically for the purposes of entertaining the troops serving during the war.

== Premise ==
Mystery Playhouse was created by the American Forces Network in 1944 for the entertainment of the troops during World War II.

Every week, the series aired rebroadcasts of episodes of many popular radio shows of the time. Some include rebroadcast of The Whistler, Mr. and Mrs. North, Inner Sanctum Mystery, and The Adventures of Nero Wolfe.

Peter Lorre's way of introducing each episode was noted as "...part plot summary, and part philosophical about the human condition".

== Episodes ==
- "Death Is a Joker" - June 10, 1944
- "Fifty Candles" - July 25, 1944
- "Nightmare" - November 28, 1944
- "The Bottle" - December 12, 1944
- "The Letter" - December 26, 1944
- "Deadline at Dawn" - January 30, 1945
- "The Eleventh Juror" - April 3, 1945
- "Lady in the Morgue" - May 15, 1945
- "Angel Face" - October 5, 1945
- "A Death is Caused Part I" - October 12, 1945
- "A Death is Caused Part II" - October 12, 1945
- "Leg Man - October" 19, 1945
- "Ladies in Retirement" - January 18, 1946
- "Witness for the Prosecution" - May 31, 1946
- "Female of the Species" - June 7, 1946
- "The Adventure of the Fa" - June 14, 1946

== Listen to ==
Audio of Mystery Playhouse
