= Julia Sanderson =

American actress

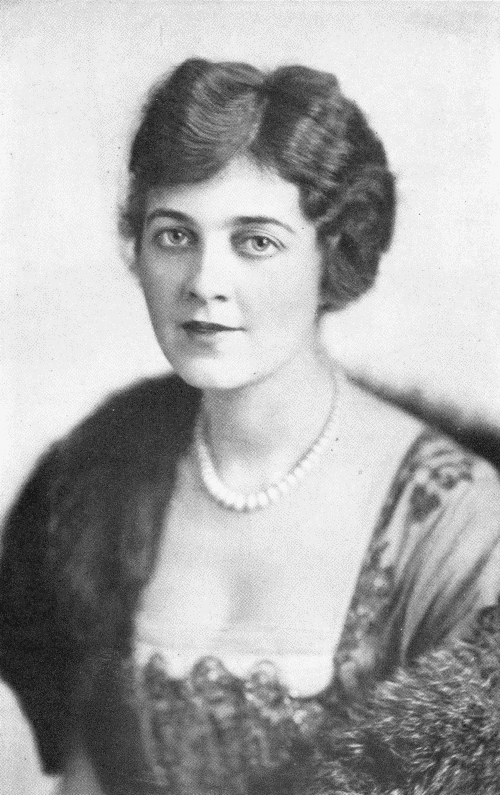
- Julia Sanderson
- Born: Julia Ellen Sackett; August 27, 1887; Springfield, Massachusetts, U.S.
- Died: January 27, 1975 (aged 87); Springfield, Massachusetts, U.S.
- Occupation: Actress
- Years active: 1903–1943
- Spouse(s): Tod Sloan (divorced); Bradford Barnette (divorced); Frank Crumit (1928-1943; his death)

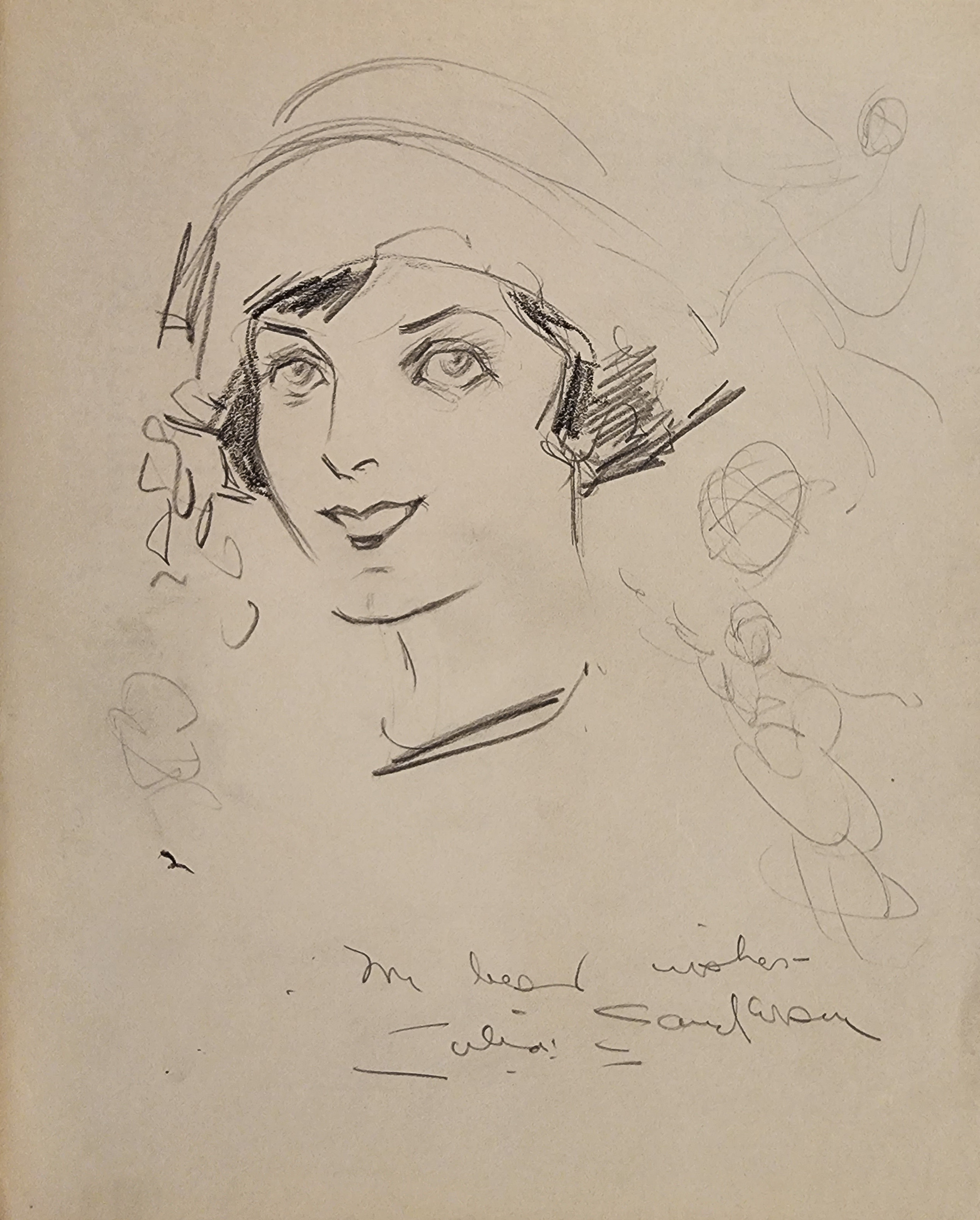
Signed drawing of Julia Sanderson by Manuel Rosenberg for the Cincinnati Post 1923

Julia Sanderson (born Julia Ellen Sackett; August 27, 1887 – January 27, 1975) was a Broadway actress and singer. In 1887, she was born in Springfield, Massachusetts, to parents Albert H. Sackett (also a Broadway actor) and Jeanette Elvira Sanderson.

== Stage career ==
She was first managed within the family circle as a child and teenaged actor, with assistance from her Broadway-experienced father and her mother. At the age of 18, she was in a show called Brewster's Million. She then played in the chorus of Winsome Winni and as understudy to actress Miss Paula Edwardes. She was also considered for a part in a show called The Motor Girl, considered appropriate because of her interest and ownership of the early automobile.

In 1906, she continued to prove busy as she went into the part of Mrs. Pineapple in A Chinese Honeymoon. After this, she was retained to play Mataya in Wang with De Wolf Hopper. Then she played a part in Fantanaand then had a cast part in The Tourists, but resigned from the company in December 1906. She appeared in The Dairymaids, opening in Atlantic City in August 1907, then at the Criterion Theatre in New York City and on tour in the 1907 season before going across to the United Kingdom, having been engaged by Charles Frohman.

== Marriages ==
She was married three times, but had no children. Her first marriage was to Tod Sloan, a jockey, on 22 September 1907. She sought and obtained a divorce from him on February 10, 1913. Her second marriage was to Navy Lieutenant Commander Bradford Barnette, head of the United States Navy's Hydrographic Department, and son of Rear Admiral W.G. Barnette, USN. Her third marriage was to singer Frank Crumit. They courted for six years while appearing in the musical Tangerine, before marrying on July 1, 1927. Sanderson was sued for divorce in September 1922 by her second husband, Barnette, with Crumit, 33, named as co-respondent. Crumit was, at the time, still married to a Connecticut woman.

Crumit and Sanderson wed in 1928, and they retired briefly to Dunrovin, their country home at Longmeadow, a suburb of Springfield. In 1930, they began working as a radio team, singing duets and engaging in comedy dialogues. The couple starred in Blackstone Plantation, which was broadcast on CBS (1929-1930) and NBC (1930-1934). They performed as the "Singing Sweethearts". In 1930, they continued with a popular quiz show, The Battle of the Sexes, which ran 13 years. Crumit and Sanderson drove from Massachusetts to New York City, a four-hour trip, twice a week to do their radio show. Their final broadcast was aired the day before Crumit's death of a heart attack in New York City on September 7, 1943.

== Filmography ==
- Two Daughters of Eve (1912 D.W. Griffith)*short (unconfirmed)
- The Runaway (1917 Mutual)

== Retirement and death ==
After Crumit's death, Sanderson retired from the stage, and returned to live in Springfield at her estate. She died in Springfield on January 27, 1975, aged 87.

== Legacy ==
The Julia Sanderson Theater, named after her, is on the U.S. National Register of Historic Places n Springfield.
