= Frank Crumit =

American singer (1889–1943)

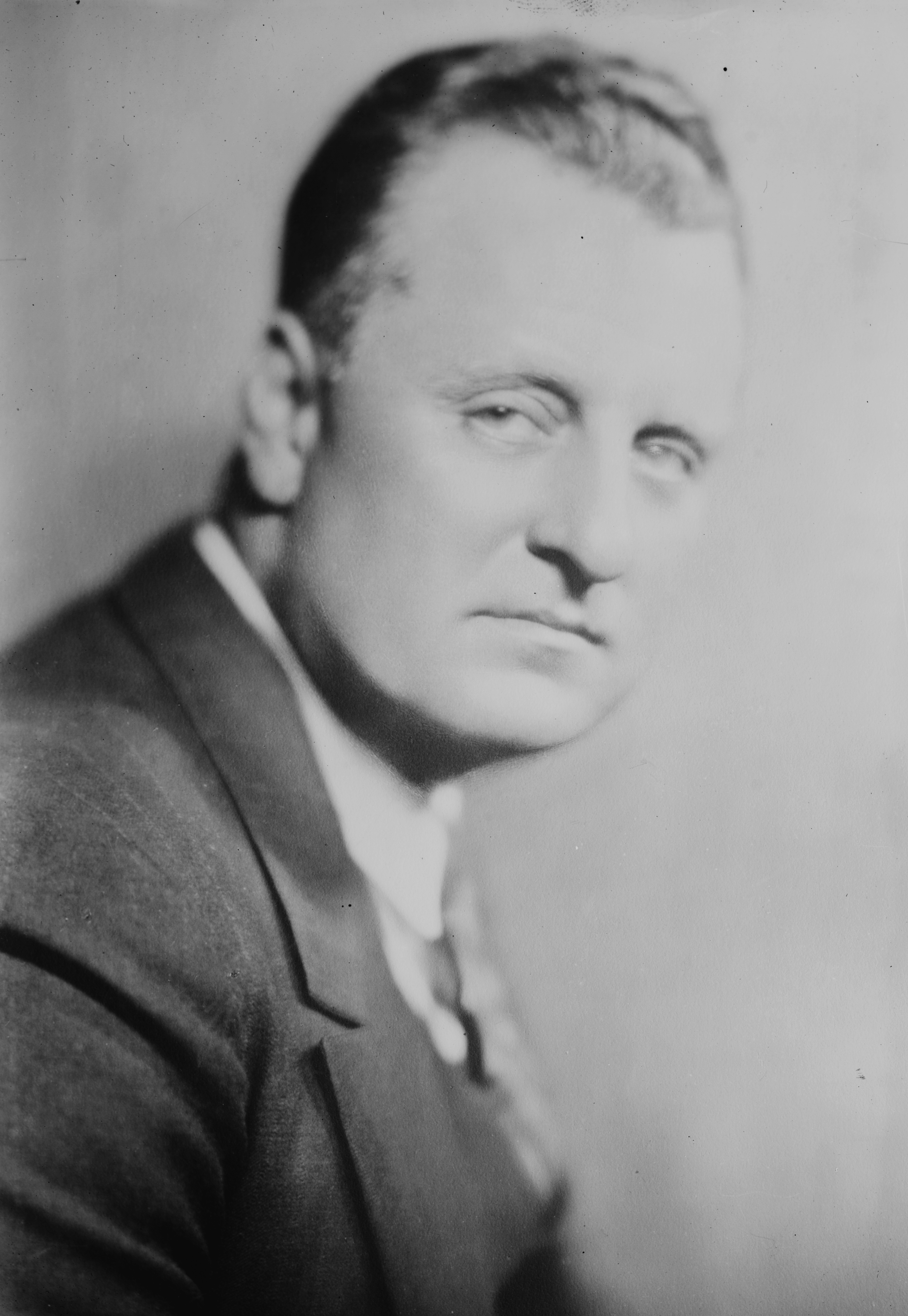
- Frank Crumit

Shepherd of The Lambs
- In office 1932–1936
- Preceded by: A. O. Brown
- Succeeded by: William Gaxton

Personal details
- Born: September 26, 1889 Jackson, Ohio, U.S.
- Died: September 7, 1943 (aged 53) New York City, New York, U.S.
- Spouse(s): Ethel Conrad, Julia Sanderson (1927)
- Occupation: Actor, Singer
- Known for: Vaudeville, Radio

Frank Crumit (September 26, 1889 – September 7, 1943) was an American singer, composer, radio entertainer, and vaudeville star. He shared his radio programs with his wife, Julia Sanderson, and the two were sometimes called "the ideal couple of the air."

== Biography ==
Crumit was born in Jackson, Ohio, the son of Frank and Mary (née Poore) Crumit. He made his first stage appearance at the age of five in a minstrel show.

Attending local schools, Crumit graduated from high school in 1907. After briefly attending an Indiana military academy, he entered Ohio University and later Ohio State University. His primary purpose for entering Ohio University was to follow in the footsteps of his grandfather, Dr. C. K. Crumit, who had been a medical doctor. He instead graduated from Ohio State University with a degree in electrical engineering. This career did not last long, as his passion seemed to be music and the old ballads of the 19th century; his love of music and theater dated back to his early years in the Methodist Church choir and led him to pursue a musical career. He studied voice in Cincinnati and then tried out unsuccessfully for opera in New York City.

By 1913, in his early 20s, he was performing on the vaudeville stage, first with a trio and then a year later on his own, playing ukulele; he was referred to as "the one-man glee club" in New York City's night spots. He appeared in the Broadway musical Betty Be Good in 1918, where he was the first to play the ukulele on Broadway.

He was a success there and went on to Greenwich Village Follies of 1920, which featured his song, "Sweet Lady", written with David B. Zoob. Crumit began making records for American Columbia in 1919, during the time of the acoustic or "horn" method of recording, an entirely mechanical process that preceded the development of microphones and amplifiers in the mid-1920s. Crumit also occasionally added vocals and banjo to recordings by the Paul Biese Trio on the American Columbia label. By the end of 1923, Crumit was recording for the Victor Talking Machine Company.

He met Julia Sanderson, then a musical comedy star, in 1922. Sanderson, 38, was sued for divorce in September of that year by her then-husband, U.S. Navy Lieut. Bradford Barnette, with Crumit, 33, named as co-respondent. Crumit was married to a Connecticut woman at the time.

Crumit and Sanderson were married in 1928, and retired briefly to a country home near Springfield, Massachusetts, but two years later, they began working as a radio team, singing duets and engaging in comedy dialogues. The couple starred in Blackstone Plantation, which was broadcast on CBS (1929–1930), on NBC (1930–1934) and also on NBC Blue (1931-1932). They performed as the "Singing Sweethearts of the Air."

In 1930, they continued with a popular quiz show, The Battle of the Sexes, which ran 13 years; because all radio programs of their era were broadcast "live", Crumit and Sanderson drove from Massachusetts to New York City, a four-hour trip, twice a week to do their radio show. Their final broadcast was aired the day before Crumit's death from a heart attack in New York City on September 7, 1943.

Crumit was elected Shepherd (president) of The Lambs in October 1932, succeeding A. O. Brown. He led the theatrical club until 1936.

== Hit songs ==
His biggest hits were made during the 1920s and early 1930s; they included popular phonograph records of "Frankie and Johnnie", "Abdul Abulbul Amir", "A Gay Caballero" (he even recorded a sequel, "The Return of a Gay Caballero"), "The Prune Song", "There's No-one With Endurance Like the Man Who Sells Insurance", "Down in de Canebrake", "I Wish That I'd Been Born in Borneo", "What Kind of a Noise Annoys an Oyster?", and "I Learned About Women from Her". Crumit is credited with composing at least 50 songs in his career, including the Ohio State University fight song, "Buckeye Battle Cry", in 1919 for a song contest. Prior to this, he wrote at least two songs for Ohio State University, “Round on the Ends” and “OH + IO.” He composed and published "Hills of Ohio" in 1941. His song "Donald the Dub" was used as the theme music to the BBC radio adaptation of P. G. Wodehouse's Oldest Member.

His back-to-back recording (that is, one song on each side) of "The Gay Caballero" and "Abdul Abulbul Amir" (Decca W-4200) sold more than four million records.

His 1929 song "A Tale of the Ticker", came out just a few months before the Wall Street crash in October. This song's lyrics shed light on the stock market‘s problems, correctly foreshadowing the devastating event that would happen just weeks following. The song was featured in the BBC documentary, The Great Crash 1929.

Like so many of the performers during the era, Crumit was a fan of the instruments created by the C.F. Martin & Company and used their tiple, to the point it had to be returned for a new top.
