= Wally Maher =

American actor

Wally Maher (August 4, 1908 – December 27, 1951) was an American actor, primarily on old-time radio; he was also known as the original voice of Tex Avery's cartoon character Screwy Squirrel.

== Early years ==
Maher was born in Cincinnati on August 4, 1908. He was the son of Daniel and Mary Maher, and he had three brothers and two sisters. He dropped out of high school to pursue a career in acting.

== Career ==
=== Theater ===
Maher gained early acting experience with a stock theater company in Cincinnati. His radio debut came when he portrayed Paul Baumer in a production of All Quiet on the Western Front. However, a lack of future acting opportunities led him to pray for divine guidance, and soon after he had another acting opportunity.

On Broadway, Maher portrayed Rittenhoff in Every Man for Himself (1940).

=== Radio ===
In 1936, he began working on several radio dramas from the West Coast. That same year he had one of his most prominent film performances as the reporter who films the mob attempting to lynch Spencer Tracy's character in MGM's Fury, directed by Fritz Lang.

Partial List of Wally Maher's Roles on Radio Programs
Program	Role
Brenthouse	Lance Dudley
Let George Do It	Lieutenant Riley
The Lineup	Sergeant Matt Grebb
The Main Line	Narrator
Michael Shayne	Michael Shayne
The New Adventures of Nero Wolfe	Archie Goodwin
This Is Judy Jones	Leighton
Tommy Riggs and Betty Lou	Wilbur

Other radio programs on which he appeared included The Whistler, NBC Presents: Short Story, The Eddie Bracken Show, Camel Caravan, Gang Busters, Suspense, Mr. District Attorney, Hollywood Showcase, I Love a Mystery, and Junior Miss.

Maher held offices in the Los Angeles chapter of the American Federation of Radio Artists, including being third vice-president in 1943 and a member of the board in 1945.

=== Films ===
The motion pictures in which he appeared include Nick Carter, Master Detective (1950), Pound Foolish (1940), The Story of Molly X (1949), Right Cross (1950, and Mystery Street (1950).

=== Recording career ===
In 1951, Maher and Gene Autry recorded The Story of Little Champ, a two-record album about a young colt.

=== Animated shorts ===
Maher provided the voice of Tex Avery's cartoon character Screwy Squirrel for five shorts produced at Metro-Goldwyn-Mayer, Screwball Squirrel, Happy-Go-Nutty, Big Heel-Watha (all 1944), The Screwy Truant (1945), and Lonesome Lenny (1946). He also voiced the Jimmy Durante-sounding turkey in Jerky Turkey (1945).

== Personal life and death ==
Maher married Carmella Bruno, and they had a son and two daughters. Maher died on December 26, 1951, in St. Vincent's Hospital, aged 43.
