= Screwy Squirrel =

Fictional character

- Screwy Squirrel character
- Screwy Squirrel seen in "Screwball Squirrel" (1944)
- First appearance: Screwball Squirrel (April 1, 1944; 82 years ago)
- Last appearance: Lonesome Lenny; March 9, 1946
- Created by: Tex Avery
- Designed by: Claude Smith
- Voiced by: Wally Maher (1944–1946); William Hanna (1944); Pinto Colvig (1945); Charlie Adler (1993); Jeff Bergman (2004); Paul Reubens (2013); Sean Kenin (2019–present)

In-universe information
- Aliases: Screwball Squirrel; Screwy the Screwball Squirrel
- Species: American red squirrel
- Gender: Male

Screwy Squirrel (also known as Screwball Squirrel) is an animated cartoon character, an anthropomorphic squirrel created by Tex Avery for Metro-Goldwyn-Mayer.

Among some of the more outrageous cartoon characters, Screwy's feats include pulling objects out of thin air, doubling himself, and breaking the fourth wall, all the while uttering a characteristic cackling laugh. The character was not as successful as Avery's Droopy was at this time, appearing in only five cartoons: Screwball Squirrel (1944), Happy-Go-Nutty (1944), Big Heel-Watha (1944), The Screwy Truant (1945), and Lonesome Lenny (1946).

== Characteristics ==
Screwy Squirrel is a trickster who engages in chaotic slapstick with gullible antagonists in a similar manner to Avery's rendition of Bugs Bunny and Daffy Duck. Unlike Bugs and Daffy, who possess a degree of nobility and respect for their enemies, Screwy is a sadistic character who lacks any form of self control and is actively malicious towards his enemies, stretching the physical limits of sight gags and reality purely to torture Meathead. Most of his cartoons had him paired with Meathead Dog (voiced by screenwriter Cal Howard in Screwball Squirrel, Tex Avery in Happy-Go-Nutty, and Pinto Colvig in The Screwy Truant) as his adversary. Meathead's physical appearance differed between the three shorts in which he appeared (with his ears changing color from grey-blue to black in Happy-Go-Nutty, and donning a new color palette in The Screwy Truant), but otherwise the character remained the same. In his first appearance, Screwy is at odds with Sammy Squirrel, a parody of Disney-like characters whose entire identity is his adorable appearance, yet manages to be equally as irritable as Screwy despite being polar opposites.

Screwy's shorts revolve around his infliction of various forms of torture on Meathead – or another enemy – for seven minutes, often doing so by breaking any sort of laws of reality. In The Screwy Truant, one gag has Screwy hitting Meathead over the head with everything he can find in a trunk labeled "Assorted Swell Stuff to Hit Dog on Head". When he finishes, Meathead remarks, "Gee whiz! He hit me with everything but the kitchen sink!" Screwy responds with, "Well, don't want to disappoint you, chum", then pulls out that very item and bashes him over the head with it.

Screwy would make his last regular appearance in the 1946 short Lonesome Lenny (a broad parody of the characters of George and Lenny from the John Steinbeck novel Of Mice and Men). In the cartoon, Screwy gets adopted from a pet store by a wealthy woman as a new companion for her pet Lenny, a large dimwitted dog with unfathomable strength. By the end of the cartoon, Lenny reveals that he accidentally "killed" Screwy by crushing him to death from a hug, with him lifting up the squirrel's flattened body from his "pocket" as evidence. However, Screwy brings a sign out from behind his back that reads, "Sad ending, isn't it?" in his final moments.

The reason as to why Screwy was discontinued after five cartoons was said to be that Tex Avery grew to openly dislike the character. Animator Mark Kausler recalled that he used to send Avery letters about his rendition of Screwy, only for Avery to throw away anything related to the character. Additionally, Kausler claimed that Avery hated the character because he did not catch on as well as his Warner Bros. creation, Bugs Bunny.

=== Later appearances ===
Meathead Dog made a cameo appearance in the 1988 film Who Framed Roger Rabbit. He is seen sniffing around at R. K. Maroon's Cartoon Studio in the film's beginning. Screwy is mockingly mentioned by one of Eddie Valiant's bar patrons Angelo, when he says, "Who's your client, Mr. Detective of the Stars? Chilly Willy, or Screwy Squirrel?"

A voice clip of Wally Maher as Screwy from the character's debut short was recycled for the character Dweezil in the video game Putty.

In 1993, Patrick Ventura was developing a series starring Screwy and Meathead at Hanna-Barbera. Joe Barbera intervened, wanting Screwy's personality to be toned down and made more "soft and likeable" for modern audiences. Hanna-Barbera resurrected Screwy in new animation for the series Droopy, Master Detective as part of Fox Kids' programming block of Saturday morning cartoons. Those new cartoons had the character renamed "Screwball" and pitted him not against Meathead, but against a pair of typical Hanna-Barbera authority figures, a human park attendant named Dweeble and his oafish dog Rumply. "Screwball" himself wore a T-shirt and often a "Napoleon-style" bicorne hat. He lived in a hollow tree in the center of the grounds and frequently annoyed Dweeble with his antics (not unlike fellow cartoon funny animals The Shirt Tales, though minus the redeeming social value). Screwy was used as a template for Animaniacs character Slappy Squirrel, and Ventura's own Sledgehammer O'Possum in What a Cartoon!.

On April Fools' Day in 1997, Cartoon Network broadcast an edited version (minus one blackface gag) of the 1944 Screwy Squirrel cartoon Happy-Go-Nutty repeatedly from 6 am to 6 p, as part of an April Fool's joke that the cartoon character had seized control of the network. On April Fool's Day in 2012, Cartoon Network broadcast Screwy Squirrel's debut cartoon The Screwball Squirrel, at 6:00 am and 11:45 am, which marked the first time that a cartoon by Tex Avery was broadcast on the network since The Tex Avery Show.

In 2013, both Meathead and Screwy Squirrel made appearances as residents of "Fairy Land" in Tom and Jerry's Giant Adventure, retaining most of their traits. Screwy Squirrel was voiced by Paul Reubens and Meathead was voiced by John DiMaggio.

In 2019, Screwy Squirrel made an appearance as a landlord of an apartment building called Screwy Arms Apartments, in the third season of The Tom and Jerry Show episode called "Double Dog Trouble". He also made various cameos in the series. Screwy was voiced by Sean Kenin.

American animator and producer Bruce W. Smith briefly began developing a series for Warner Bros. starring the titular character. In Smith's proposed story line, which was never produced, Screwy thinks he is in Hollywood, California, but in reality he is in Hollywood, Alabama.

== Voice actors ==
- Wally Maher (1944–46)
- William Hanna (scream in Screwball Squirrel)
- Pinto Colvig (laughing in The Screwy Truant)
- Charlie Adler (Droopy, Master Detective)
- Jeff Bergman (Boomerang bumpers)
- Paul Reubens (Tom and Jerry's Giant Adventure)
- Sean Kenin (The Tom and Jerry Show)

== Cartoons ==
#	Title	Release date
1	Screwball Squirrel	April 1, 1944
2	Happy-Go-Nutty	June 24, 1944
3	Big Heel-Watha	October 21, 1944
4	The Screwy Truant	January 13, 1945
5	Lonesome Lenny	March 9, 1946

== Comics ==
=== List of comics appearances ===
- Our Gang Comics #12–14 (1944) (Dell Comics)
- Tom & Jerry's Winter Carnival #1 (1952), #2 (1953) (Dell)
- Tom & Jerry's Winter Fun #3 (1954), #6 (1957), #7 (1958), #8 (1958) (Dell)
- Tom & Jerry's Summer Fun #1 (1954), #2 (1955) (Dell)
- Tom and Jerry #213 (1962), #231, #232 (1966), #258 (1971)
- Golden Comics Digest #3, #5 (1969), #8 (1970), #18 (1971), #22, #25 (1972), #28 (1973), #41 (1975) (Gold Key Comics)
- Tex Avery's Wolf and Red various issues (1995) (Dark Horse Comics)
- Tex Avery's Screwball Squirrel (1995) (Dark Horse Comics)
- Tex Avery's Droopy various issues (1995) (Dark Horse Comics)
- Comics and Stories various issues (1996) (Dark Horse Comics)

Some earlier comics style the character's name as "Skrewy Squirrel" or "Skrewy the Screwball Squirrel." Additional titles, not listed here, include the character in one-page gag or puzzle features.

== Home media ==
Several Screwy Squirrel cartoons were released as bonus features on classic Warner Bros. titles including:

- Screwball Squirrel on the DVD of The Thin Man Goes Home
- Happy-Go-Nutty on the DVD of Dragon Seed
- The Screwy Truant on the DVD of The Clock (1945 film)
- Lonesome Lenny on the DVD of Undercurrent
- Screwball Squirrel on the Blu-Ray of Looney Tunes Platinum Collection: Volume 2 (Disc 3)

In March 2020, Screwball Squirrel, The Screwy Traunt, Big Heel-Watha and Lonesome Lenny were released on Blu-Ray, fully restored and uncut, by Warner Archive as part of Tex Avery Screwball Classics: Volume 1. Happy Go Nutty was released on October 5, 2021 as part of Tex Avery Screwball Classics: Volume 3- completing Screwy’s filmography.
