= Santos Ortega =

American actor

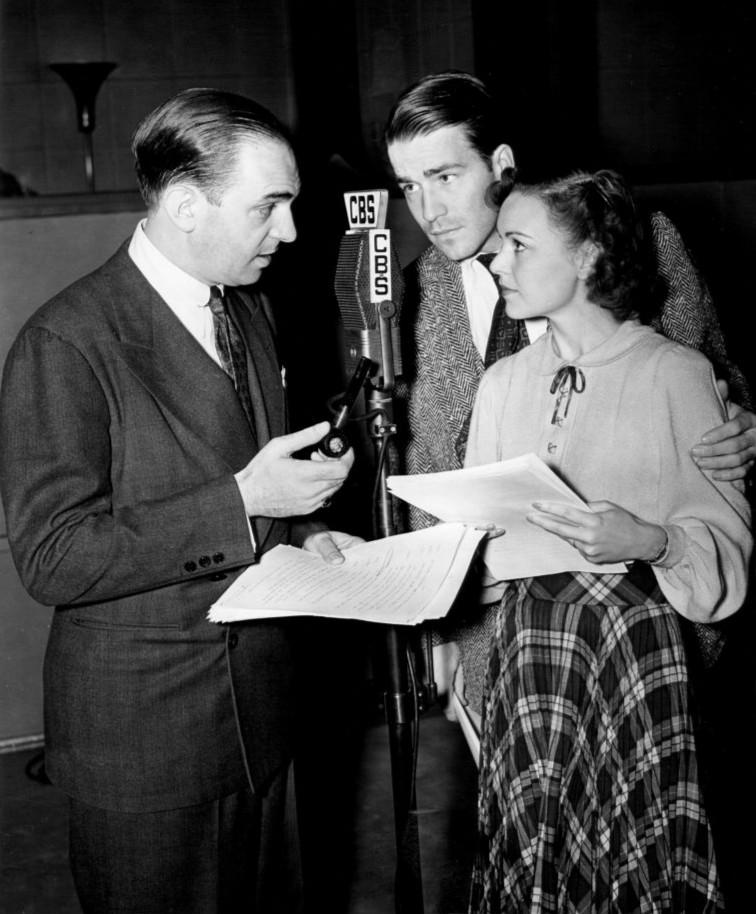
- Ortega (left) as Inspector Queen with Hugh Marlowe as Ellery Queen and Marian Shockley as Nikki in The Adventures of Ellery Queen, 1939
- Born: June 30, 1899; New York City, New York, U.S.
- Died: April 10, 1976 (aged 76); Fort Lauderdale, Florida, U.S.
- Other name: Santos Ortegga
- Occupations: Actor; comedian

Santos Edward Ortega (June 30, 1899 – April 10, 1976) was an American actor and comedian. He was best known for playing Will Hughes in As the World Turns, taking over from Will Lee, who had played the role from the first episode on April 2, 1956, to May 31, 1956. Ortega continued in the role until his death in 1976.

== Biography ==
=== Early life ===
Ortega was born in New York City on June 30, 1899, to parents Rafael (born of Spanish descent) and Isabella (née Corbett, from Ireland) Ortega. Rafael Ortega was a cigar maker by trade, which may have influenced his son's habit of cigar smoking throughout his career.

Ortega initially had aspirations of joining the priesthood and studied briefly at the St. Joseph's Seminary of the De La Salle Christian Brothers in Pocantico Hills, New York, but changed his mind after landing a series of small acting roles in a series of Broadway productions.

=== Stage ===
He began his career when he was 17 in the theater in "an extravaganza at the old Hippodrome Theater. Later, he went on tour with a singing group, returning to New York City to appear on the Broadway stage including roles in Jeb (1946), Puppets of Passion (1927), What Never Dies (1926-1927), What's the Use (1926), and Marilyn's Affairs.

=== Radio ===
As radio stations began to come on the air in large numbers, radio programs began to gain momentum, thus opening up new opportunities for Ortega. He first worked in radio in comedy, appearing on a variety show, Blackstone Plantation, where he played a character named Don Rodrigo. Ortega later said that he was hired for the role after a casting director hired the young unknown based on seeing Ortega's name, assuming that he would be perfect for the role.

Despite Ortega's ethnic-sounding name, and the fact that he did have Latino origins on his father's side, he did not speak Spanish. He came to learn that if he convincingly mastered a Spanish dialect, more work would come his way, and it did.

He served as straight man for the duo of Frank Crumit and Julius Sanderson. Ortega said, "It was a song and patter show, and I provided the laughter." He went on to be active in the medium, starring in The Adventures of Nero Wolfe (1943–1944) and narrating Gang Busters, as well as Stroke of Fate. Perhaps his most famous and notable radio role was Commissioner Weston on The Shadow. He played the title role in Bulldog Drummond (1942–43) and was heard in the daytime radio serials Valiant Lady (as Edward Curran), Perry Mason, 1948's Roger Kilgore, Public Defender, and as the title character in The Adventures of Charlie Chan (1947–1948), The Affairs of Peter Salem from 1949 to 1953, and Hannibal Cobb (1950–1951).

From the 1930s into the early 1960s, the prolific Ortega lent his wide range of voice characterizations to numerous other radio drama series such as Inner Sanctum, The Mysterious Traveler, Suspense, Casey Crime Photographer, The Eternal Light, The Columbia Workshop, The Big Story, Perry Mason, You Are There, Dimension X, and X Minus One.

He also originated the radio role of Inspector Queen on The Adventures of Ellery Queen.

=== Television ===
On television, he played Will Hughes (usually just referred to as "Grandpa") on As the World Turns, replacing Will Lee as of June 21, 1956. On November 22, 1963, he was in the middle of a scene with actress Helen Wagner when CBS suddenly cut in with the first bulletin on President Kennedy's assassination. (The cast, who were performing the episode live, were not yet aware of the situation.) Ortega continued in the role until shortly before his death in 1976.

=== Film ===
Ortega played character roles in two films during the 1950s: The Family Secret (1951) and Crowded Paradise (1956).

=== Personal life ===
Ortega was married twice. He married Evelyn Fairbank in 1926, but the couple had no children and later divorced. He later married Cynthia Beckett, 20 years his junior, when he was around 50 years old. They would go on to have two children.

Ortega was a lifelong tobacco user who often smoked cigars during his radio shows. However, during his tenure on "As the World Turns," he was most often seen smoking a pipe.

=== Death ===
Ortega died on April 10, 1976, in Broward General Hospital in Fort Lauderdale, Florida, while he was visiting in that area. He was 76. Survivors included a son, a daughter and a sister. A memorial service was held April 25, 1976, at the Church of the Heavenly Rest in New York City.

== Filmography ==
- As the World Turns (1956-1976): Will Hughes
