= Sydney Greenstreet =

British and American actor (1879–1954)

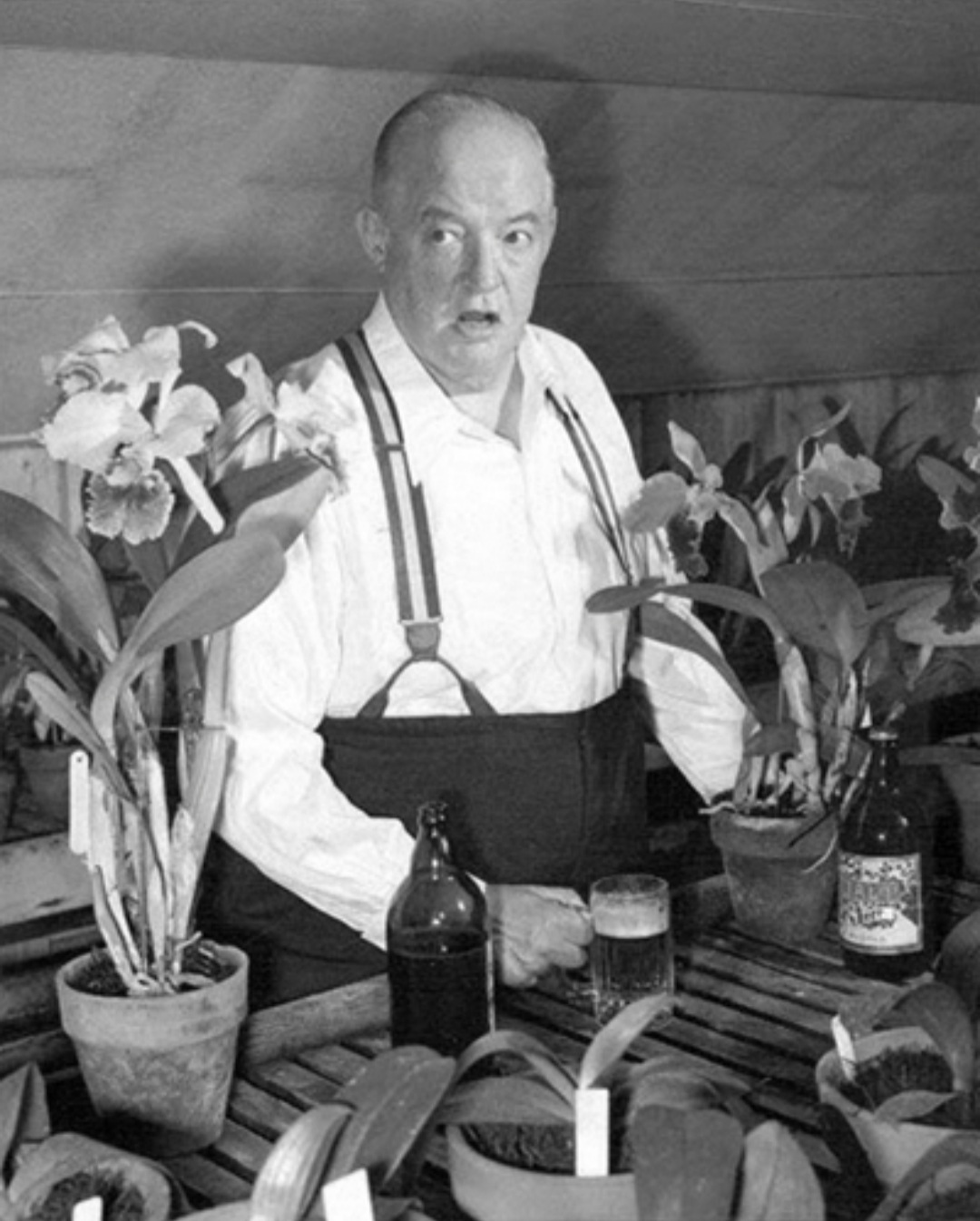
- Greenstreet in NBC radio's The New Adventures of Nero Wolfe (1950)
- Born: Sydney Hughes Greenstreet; December 27, 1879; West Malling, Kent, England
- Died: January 18, 1954 (aged 74); Hollywood, California, U.S.
- Resting place: Forest Lawn Memorial Park, Glendale
- Occupation: Actor
- Years active: 1902–1951
- Spouse: Dorothy Marie Ogden (m. 1918)
- Children: 1

Sydney Hughes Greenstreet (December 27, 1879 – January 18, 1954) was a British and American character actor. While he did not begin his career in films until the age of 61, he had a run of significant motion pictures in a Hollywood career lasting through the 1940s. He is best remembered for the three Warner Bros. films – The Maltese Falcon (1941, his first film role), Casablanca (1942), and Passage to Marseille (1944) – with both Humphrey Bogart (five films total with Greenstreet) and Peter Lorre (nine films with Greenstreet, three of which were also with Bogart). Greenstreet was nominated for the Academy Award for Best Supporting Actor for his performance in The Maltese Falcon. He portrayed Nero Wolfe on radio during 1950 and 1951. He became an American citizen in 1925.

== Early life ==
Sydney Hughes Greenstreet was born on December 27, 1879, in Eastry, Kent, the son of Ann (née Baker) and John Jarvis Greenstreet, a tanner. In the 1881 census, his father was recorded as a Master Tanner employing eighteen men, and the Greenstreet family was living in Sandwich, Kent, and had three living-in servants. The 1891 census finds Greenstreet and three of his brothers living at Dane Hill School, Margate, a boarding school for boys aged ten to eighteen, with the Rev. Charles Boulden as headmaster. Greenstreet had seven siblings. He left home at the age of 18 to make his fortune as a Ceylon tea planter, but drought forced him out of business. He began managing a brewery and, to escape boredom, took acting lessons.

== Career ==
Greenstreet's stage debut was as a murderer in a 1902 production of a Sherlock Holmes story at the Marina Theatre, Ramsgate, Kent. He toured Britain with Ben Greet's Shakespearean company, and in 1905 made his New York City debut in Everyman. He appeared in such plays as a revival of As You Like It (1914). He appeared in numerous plays in Britain and America, working through most of the 1930s with Alfred Lunt and Lynn Fontanne at the Theatre Guild. His stage roles ranged from musical comedy to Shakespeare, and years of such versatile acting on two continents led to many offers to appear in films. He refused until he was 61.

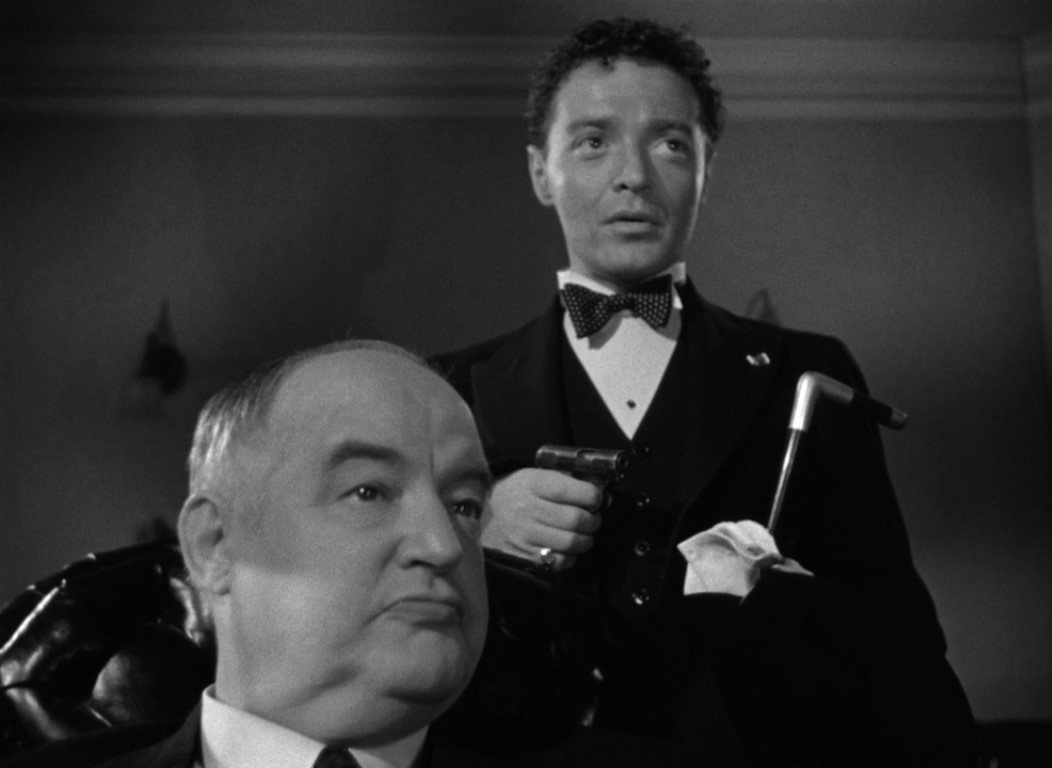
Greenstreet and Peter Lorre in The Maltese Falcon (1941)

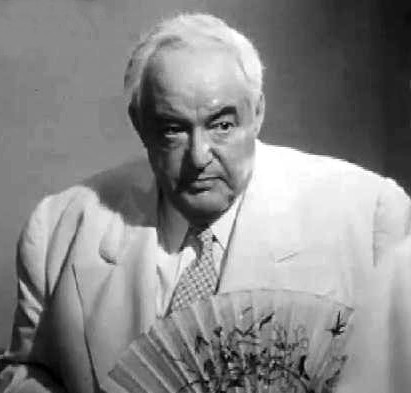
Greenstreet in Across the Pacific (1942)

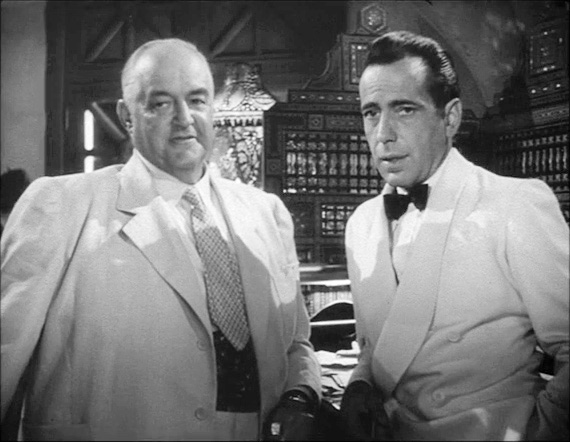
Greenstreet and Humphrey Bogart in Casablanca (1942)

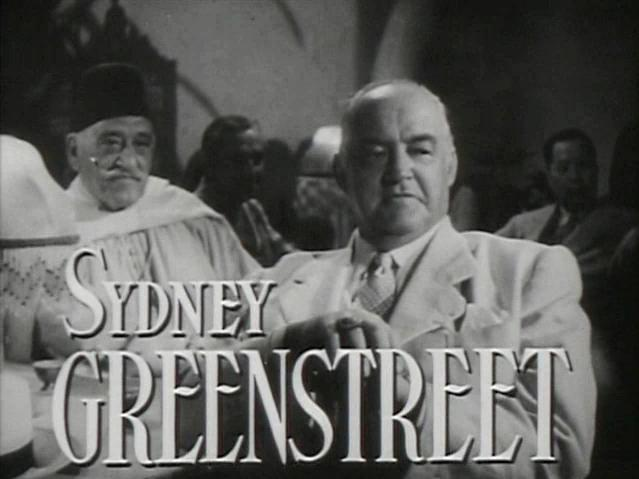
Greenstreet in Casablanca (1942)

In 1941, Greenstreet began working for Warner Bros. His debut film role was as Kasper Gutman ("The Fat Man") co-starring with Humphrey Bogart in The Maltese Falcon. In Casablanca (1942), Greenstreet played crooked club owner Signor Ferrari (for which he received a salary of $3,750 per week—equivalent to $82,972 in 2026 dollars—for seven weeks' work). He also appeared in Background to Danger (1943), with George Raft; Passage to Marseille (1944), reuniting with Casablanca stars Bogart, Peter Lorre and Claude Rains; The Mask of Dimitrios (1944); The Conspirators (1944) with Hedy Lamarr and Paul Henreid; Hollywood Canteen (1944); Conflict (1945), again with Bogart; Three Strangers (1946); and The Verdict (1946). In the last two, and The Mask of Dimitrios, he received top billing. He had dramatic roles, such as William Makepeace Thackeray in Devotion (1946), and witty performances in screwball comedies, such as Alexander Yardley in Christmas in Connecticut (1945). Near the end of his film career, he played opposite Joan Crawford in Flamingo Road (1949).

After little more than eight years, Greenstreet's film career ended with Malaya (also 1949), in which he was billed fourth, after Spencer Tracy, James Stewart and Valentina Cortese. In those years, he worked with stars ranging from Clark Gable to Ava Gardner to Joan Crawford. Author Tennessee Williams wrote his one-act play The Last of My Solid Gold Watches with Greenstreet in mind, and dedicated it to him. During 1950–1951, Greenstreet played Nero Wolfe on the radio program The New Adventures of Nero Wolfe, based loosely on the rotund detective genius created by Rex Stout.

== Death and legacy ==
Greenstreet suffered from diabetes and Bright's disease, a kidney disorder. Five years after retiring from film acting, he died on January 18, 1954, in Hollywood. His death was caused by complications from both conditions. He is interred at Forest Lawn Memorial Park, Glendale, California, in the Utility Columbarium area of the Great Mausoleum, inaccessible to the public. He was survived by his only child, John Ogden Greenstreet (1920–2004), from his marriage to Dorothy Marie Ogden. Actor Mark Greenstreet is his great-nephew.

== Academy Award nomination ==
Year	Film	Category	Result
1941	The Maltese Falcon	Best Supporting Actor	Nominated

== Filmography ==
Year	Title	Role	Notes
1941	The Maltese Falcon	Kasper Gutman	Nominated – Academy Award for Best Supporting Actor
1941	They Died with Their Boots On	Lt. Gen. Winfield Scott	
1942	Across the Pacific	Dr. Lorenz	
1942	Casablanca	Signor Ferrari	
1943	Background to Danger	Col. Robinson	
1944	Passage to Marseille	Major Duval	
1944	Between Two Worlds	Rev. Tim Thompson	
1944	The Mask of Dimitrios	Mr. Peters	
1944	The Conspirators	Ricardo Quintanilla	
1944	Hollywood Canteen	Himself	
1945	Pillow to Post	Col. Michael Otley	
1945	Conflict	Dr. Mark Hamilton	
1945	Christmas in Connecticut	Alexander Yardley	
1946	Three Strangers	Jerome K. Arbutny	
1946	Devotion	William Makepeace Thackeray	
1946	The Verdict	Supt. George Edward Grodman	
1947	That Way with Women	James P. Alden	
1947	The Hucksters	Evan Llewellyn Evans	
1948	Ruthless	Buck Mansfield	
1948	The Woman in White	Count Alessandro Fosco	
1948	The Velvet Touch	Capt. Danbury	
1949	Flamingo Road	Sheriff Titus Semple	
1949	It's a Great Feeling	Himself	Uncredited
1949	Malaya	The Dutchman	
