= 1928 in animation =

Events in 1928 in animation.

== Events ==
=== February ===
- February 13: The Laurel & Hardy short film Flying Elephants is released. It has a short animated sequence with a flying elephant, animated by Walter Lantz.

=== September ===
- September 1: Paul Terry's Farmer Alfalfa cartoon Dinner Time is an early attempt to synchronize animation with sound.

=== November ===
- November 18: Walt Disney's Steamboat Willie is released, one of the first cartoons with a synchronized soundtrack. It marks the debuts of Mickey, and Minnie Mouse. It also launches the long-running film series Mickey Mouse. November 18 will later be officially declared as the characters' birthday.

== Films released ==
Excerpt from Steamboat Willie

- 5 January – Short Circuit (United States)
- 8 January – The Smoke Scream (United States)
- 14 January – Pig Styles (United States)
- 22 January – Draggin' th' Dragon (United States)
- 28 January – Shadow Theory (United States)
- 5 February – The Oily Bird (United States)
- 11 February – Ice Boxed (United States)
- 13 February - Flying Elephants (United States)
- 19 February – Ohm Sweet Ohm (United States)
- 20 February – Africa Before Dark (United States)
- 25 February – A Hunger Stroke (United States)
- 4 March – Japanicky (United States)
- 10 March – Wired and Fired (United States)
- 18 March –Polly-tics (United States)
- 19 March – Bright Lights (United States)
- 24 March – Love Sunk (United States)
- 1 April – Comicalamities (United States)
- 7 April – Tong Tied (United States)
- 15 April – Felix the Cat in Sure-Locked Homes (United States)
- 19 April – Eskimotive (United States)
- 21 April – A Bum Steer (United States)
- 5 May – Gold Bricks (United States)
- 13 May – Arabiantics (United States)
- 14 May – Hungry Hoboes (United States)
- 15 May – Plane Crazy (United States)
- 19 May – The Long Count (United States)
- 27 May – In- and Out-Laws (United States)
- 28 May – Oh What a Knight (United States)
- 2 June – The Patent Medicine Kid (United States)
- 10 June – Outdoor Indore (United States)
- 11 June – Poor Papa (United States)
- 16 June – Stage Coached (United States)
- 24 June:
  - The Fox Chase (United States)
  - Futuritzy (United States)
  - The Mouse's Bride (United States)
- 30 June – The Rain Dropper (United States)
- 8 July – Astronomeows (a.k.a. Astronomeous) (United States)
- 9 July – Tall Timber (United States)
- 14 July:
  - Ghosts Before Breakfast (Germany)
  - A Companionate Mirage (United States)
- 22 July – Jungle Bungles (United States)
- 4 August:
  - News Reeling (United States)
  - Static (United States)
- 5 August – The Last Life (United States)
- 16 August – Baby Feud (United States)
- 26 August – In the Bag (United States)
- 5 September – Sea Sword (United States)
- 15 September – The Show Vote (United States)
- 18 September – Sunday on the Farm (United States)
- 29 September – The Phantom Trail (United States)
- 14 October – Dinner Time (United States)
- 15 October – Come Easy, Go Slow (United States)
- 29 October – Beaches and Scream (United States)
- 4 November – Animal Olympic Games (Japan)
- 9 November – Nicked Nags (United States)
- 18 November – Steamboat Willie (United States)
- 23 November – Liar Bird (United States)
- 26 November – Barnyard Politics (United States)
- 7 December – Still Waters (United States)
- 22 December – Night Owls (United States)
- 23 December – Stage Struck (United States)
- 30 December – The Gallopin' Gaucho (United States)

== Births ==
=== January ===
- January 4: Jan Lenica, Polish graphic designer, cartoonist, poster illustrator and animator (Dom, A, Adam 2, Ubu et la grande gidouille), (d. 2001).
- January 5:
  - Denise Bryer, British actress (voice of Twizzle in The Adventures of Twizzle, Commander Makara in Star Fleet, Noddy in The Noddy Shop), (d. 2021).
  - Joe Harris, American illustrator and storybook artist (creator of the Trix Rabbit, co-creator of Underdog), (d. 2017).
- January 13: Robert Verrall, Canadian animator (The Romance of Transportation in Canada, What on Earth!, Cosmic Zoom), (d. 2025).
- January 26: Bob Singer, American animation artist, character designer, layout and background artist and storyboard director (Hanna-Barbera).
- January 29: Pierre Tchernia, French producer, screenwriter and animator (Asterix, Lucky Luke), (d. 2016).

=== February ===
- February 2: Yugo Sako, Japanese film director, producer and animator (Ramayana: The Legend of Prince Rama), (d. 2012).
- February 4: David Ketchum, American actor (voice of the Announcer in Roger Ramjet) and screenwriter (Captain Caveman and the Teen Angels, The Funky Phantom, The Roman Holidays, Jeannie, Wait Till Your Father Gets Home, The Scooby-Doo/Dynomutt Hour), (d. 2025).
- February 11: Conrad Janis, American jazz trombonist and actor (voice of Frederick McConnell in Mork & Mindy/Laverne & Shirley/Fonz Hour), (d. 2022).
- February 15: Norman Bridwell, American author and cartoonist (creator of Clifford the Big Red Dog), (d. 2014).
- February 22: Paul Dooley, American actor, writer and comedian (voice of Sarge in the Cars franchise, Gazooks in Raggedy Ann & Andy: A Musical Adventure, Hank the Janitor/Mall Santa in Recess Christmas: Miracle on Third Street, Father Michael in the Batman: The Animated Series episode "It's Never Too Late", Stan in the Duckman episode "Dammit, Hollywood", Security Guard in the American Dad! episode "Next of Pin").
- February 28: Hoàng Việt, Vietnamese composer and animator, (d. 1967).
- February 29: Joss Ackland, British actor (voice of Black Rabbit in Watership Down, Brigand in The Thief and the Cobbler, Samuel and Noah in Testament: The Bible in Animation, Julius Caesar in the Shakespeare: The Animated Tales episode "Julius Caesar"), (d. 2023).

=== March ===
- March 7: Štěpán Koníček, Czech composer and conductor (Munro, Gene Deitch, Popeye the Sailor, Tom and Jerry, Jan Svankmajer), (d. 2006).
- March 16: Pepita Pardell, Spanish animator, cartoonist, illustrator and painter (worked for Balet y Blay), (d. 2019).
- March 19: Patrick McGoohan, Irish-American actor, director, screenwriter and producer (voice of Billy Bones in Treasure Planet, Number Six in The Simpsons episode "The Computer Wore Menace Shoes"), (d. 2009).
- March 20:
  - Fred Rogers, American television host, author, producer and minister (voiced himself in the Arthur episode "Arthur Meets Mister Rogers"), (d. 2003).
  - Eddy Ryssack, Belgian comics artist and animator (worked for Belvision), (d. 2004).

=== April ===
- April 1: Peter Maddocks, English editorial cartoonist, comic artist and animator (The Family-Ness, Jimbo and the Jet Set, Penny Crayon), (d. 2024).
- April 5: Gene Merlino, American singer and musician (choir performer in Charlotte's Web and Heidi's Song, performed the songs South of the Border, Born Free and Jellyfish in The Simpsons, additional voices in The Little Mermaid), (d. 2024).
- April 7: James Garner, American actor (voice of God in God, the Devil and Bob, Rourke in Atlantis: The Lost Empire, Shazam in Superman/Shazam!: The Return of Black Adam), (d. 2014).
- April 9: Yoji Kuri, Japanese cartoonist and independent filmmaker (d. 2024).
- April 22: Estelle Harris, American actress and comedian (voice of Mrs. Tammy Turtle in Mickey Mouse Works and House of Mouse, Mrs. Potato Head in the Toy Story franchise, Mrs. Catherina Duckstein in Queer Duck, Old Lady Bear in Brother Bear, Mrs. June Boogin in Teacher's Pet, Audrey in Home on the Range, Mama Lipsky in Kim Possible, Lula in Dave the Barbarian, Mama Gunda in Tarzan II, Oz's Mother in Fanboy & Chum Chum, Peg-Leg Peg in Jake and the Never Land Pirates, Velma Farnsworth in the Futurama episode "Near-Death Wish", Death's Mother in the Family Guy episode "Death Lives", Timon's Mother in the Timon & Pumbaa episode "Mombasa-In-Law", Lt. Kellaway's Mother in The Mask episode "The Mother of All Hoods", Arthur's Mother in The Tick episode "The Tick vs. Dot and Neil's Wedding", Phil's Mother in the Hercules episode "Hercules and the King for a Day", Iguana and Turtle in The Wild Thornberrys episode "Eliza-cology", Old Lady and Receptionist in the Godzilla: The Series episode "What Dreams May Come", Helga in The Proud Family episode "Thelma and Luis", Mrs. Irma Mudka in The Emperor's New School episode "Mudka's Secret Recipe", Marty's Wife in the American Dad! episode "In Country... Club", Sylvester's Mother in The Looney Tunes Show episode "Point, Laser Point"), (d. 2022).
- April 27: Tamás Deák, Hungarian composer and conductor (Cat City), (d. 2024).

=== May ===
- May 1: Raoul Servais, Belgian animator, animated film director and comic artist (Chromophobia, Harpya), (d. 2023).
- May 7: John Ingle, American actor (voice of Cera's father in The Land Before Time franchise, Wise Paw in Paw Paws, Judge in the Animaniacs episode "La La Law"), (d. 2012).
- May 8: John Bennett, British actor (voice of Captain Holly in Watership Down, Don in The Plague Dogs), (d. 2005).
- May 18: Zdeňka Deitchová, Czech animator and production manager (Bratři v triku).
- May 24:
  - Dick Curtis, American actor (voice of Motormouse in Cattanooga Cats, Pappy Wilson in Skyhawks), (d. 2023).
  - Flor Vargas, Colombian actress (voice of Queen in Bolívar el héroe), (d. 2026).

=== June ===
- June 1: Bob Monkhouse, British actor and writer (voice of Mr. Hell in Aaagh! It's the Mr. Hell Show!, Johnny Saveloy in Rex the Runt), (d. 2003).
- June 2: Bob Amsberry, American actor (voice of Joe Muffaw in Paul Bunyan, one of Maleficent's goons in Sleeping Beauty), (d. 1957).
- June 7: Charles Strouse, American composer (Alice in Wonderland or What's a Nice Kid Like You Doing in a Place Like This?, All Dogs Go to Heaven), (d. 2025).
- June 9: Jackie Mason, American comedian and actor (voice of Rabbi Hyman Krustofski in The Simpsons, The Sandman in The Fairly OddParents episode "Beddy Bye"), (d. 2021).
- June 10: Maurice Sendak, American author and illustrator (Really Rosie, Little Bear, Seven Little Monsters, Where the Wild Things Are, Higglety Pigglety Pop! or There Must Be More to Life), (d. 2012).
- June 12: Richard M. Sherman, American songwriter (Walt Disney Animation Studios, Snoopy Come Home, Charlotte's Web, Little Nemo: Adventures in Slumberland, The Mighty Kong), (d. 2024).
- June 15: Laurence Badie, French actress (French dub voice of Velma Dinkley in the Scooby-Doo franchise), (d. 2024).
- June 16: Annie Cordy, Belgian singer, comedian and actress (dub voice of Grandmother Willow in Pocahontas), (d. 2020).
- June 20: Martin Landau, American actor, acting coach, producer and editorial cartoonist (voice of Mac Gargan/Scorpion in Spider-Man, #2 in 9, Mr. Rzykruski in Frankenweenie, The Great Raymondo in The Simpsons episode "The Great Simpsina"), (d. 2017).
- June 25:
  - Alex Toth, American comics artist and animator (Space Ghost), (d. 2006).
  - Peyo, Belgian comics artist and film director (The Smurfs and the Magic Flute), (d. 1992).

=== July ===
- July 8: Ilona Kassai, Hungarian actress (Hungarian dub voice of Katara in Avatar: The Last Airbender, Kaede in Inuyasha, Gru's Mother in Despicable Me 3), (d. 2025).
- July 9: Vince Edwards, American actor and director (voice of Jake Rockwell in Centurions), (d. 1996).
- July 13: Johnny Gilbert, American announcer (voice of Jackie Jacques in the Johnny Bravo episode "Over the Hump!", TV Host in The Angry Beavers episode "Stare and Stare Alike!", himself in the Scooby-Doo and Guess Who? episode "Total Jeopardy!").
- July 17: Vince Guaraldi, American jazz composer (Peanuts), (d. 1976).
- July 22: Orson Bean, American actor (voice of Bilbo Baggins in The Hobbit, Frodo Baggins in The Return of the King, Billy Rabbit in Garfield in the Rough, and Geppetto in the Tiny Toon Adventures episode "Fairy Tales for the 90's"), (d. 2020).

=== August ===
- August 7: Romeo Muller, American screenwriter (Rankin/Bass), (d. 1992).
- August 9: Malcolm Marmorstein, American film director and screenwriter (Pete's Dragon), (d. 2020).
- August 19: Walter Massey, Canadian actor (voice of Admiral Zogal and Deathforce Officer in Space Carrier Blue Noah, Captain Perez and The Doctor in The Mysterious Cities of Gold, Papa and Dr. Nose in Adventures of the Little Koala, Uncle Henry in The Wonderful Wizard of Oz, Polluto in The Smoggies, Plato in The Little Flying Bears, Geppetto in Saban's Adventures of Pinocchio, Piers McMaster in C.L.Y.D.E., Guru Lou in Samurai Pizza Cats, Papa Beaver in Papa Beaver's Storytime, Mr. Gronkle in The Busy World of Richard Scarry, Dentist in The Little Lulu Show, Principal Herbert Haney and Mr. Marco in Arthur, Mr. Tinker in How the Toys Saved Christmas, Dr. Stewart in Lassie, Santa Claus in Caillou's Holiday Movie, Shen-Shen's Great Great Uncle in the Sagwa, the Chinese Siamese Cat episode "Wedding Day Mess", additional voices in Diplodos, Bumpety Boo, Sharky and George, The Adventures of Peter Pan, Saban's Adventures of the Little Mermaid, Bob in a Bottle, Robinson Sucroe, Animal Crackers, The Country Mouse and the City Mouse Adventures, Caillou, Patrol 03, Ripley's Believe It or Not!, For Better or For Worse, A Miss Mallard Mystery, Wunschpunsch and Tripping the Rift), (d. 2014).
- August 31: James Coburn, American actor (voice of Henry J. Waternoose III in Monsters, Inc.), (d. 2002).

=== September ===
- September 4: Dick York, American actor (voice of Darrin Stephens in The Flintstones episode "Samantha"), (d. 1992).
- September 11: Earl Holliman, American actor (voice of Milton in the Captain Planet and the Planeteers episode "Never the Twain Shall Meet"), (d. 2024).
- September 17: Roddy McDowall, British-American actor (voice of Mad Hatter in the DC Animated Universe, Proteus in Gargoyles, the Breadmaster in The Tick, Snowball in Pinky and the Brain, Mr. Soil in A Bug's Life), (d. 1998).
- September 19: Adam West, American actor (voice of Batman in The New Adventures of Batman, Tarzan and the Super 7, Super Friends: The Legendary Super Powers Show, The Super Powers Team: Galactic Guardians, The Simpsons episode "Large Marge", Batman: New Times, Batman: Return of the Caped Crusaders and Batman vs. Two-Face, Dog Zero and Leonardo da Vinci in The Secret Files of the Spy Dogs, Mayor Adam West in Family Guy, Catman in The Fairly OddParents, Mayor Grange in The Batman, Jared Moon in Aloha, Scooby-Doo!, Ace in Chicken Little, Uncle Art in Meet the Robinsons, Thomas Wayne and Proto-Bot in Batman: The Brave and the Bold, Wise Old Parrot in Jake and the Never Land Pirates, Captain Super Captain and Professor Evil Professor in Penn Zero: Part-Time Hero, Simon Trent in the Batman: The Animated Series episode "Beware the Gray Ghost", Captain Blasto in the Rugrats episode "Superhero Chuckie", Spruce Wayne/Caped Crusader in the Animaniacs episode "Boo Wonder", Ernest Hemingway in the Histeria! episode "Super Writers", Timothy North/Fearless Ferret in the Kim Possible episode "The Fearless Ferret", R. Kelly's Lawyer in The Boondocks episode "The Trail of Robert Kelly", young Mermaid Man in the SpongeBob SquarePants episode "Back to the Past", Nighthawk in The Super Hero Squad Show episode "Whom Continuity Would Destroy!", Razzle Novak in the Moonbeam City episode "Stuntstravaganza", himself in The Simpsons episode "Mr. Plow", The Critic episode "Eyes on the Prize", the Johnny Bravo episodes "Johnny Bravo Meets Adam West" and "Adam West Date-O-Rama", The Fairly OddParents episodes "Miss Dimmsdale" and "Channel Chasers", and the Futurama episode "Leela and the Genestalk"), (d. 2017).
- September 28: Koko Taylor, American singer (voiced herself in the Arthur episode "Big Horns George"), (d. 2009).

=== October ===
- October 1: Erica Yohn, American actress (voice of Mama Mousekewitz in An American Tail), (d. 2019).
- October 2: Ted Nichols, American composer (Hanna-Barbera), (d. 2026).
- October 5: Ray Osrin, American cartoonist, animator and comics artist, (d. 2001).
- October 9: Jim MacGeorge, American actor (voice of Captain Huffenpuff, Beany Boy and Crowy in Beany and Cecil, Oliver Hardy in Laurel & Hardy), (d. 2021).
- October 19: Lou Scheimer, American animation producer (founder of Filmation), actor (voice of Dumb Donald in Fat Albert and the Cosby Kids, Orko and Stratos in He-Man and the Masters of the Universe) and composer (He-Man and the Masters of the Universe), (d. 2013).
- October 25: Marion Ross, American actress (voice of Grandma SquarePants in SpongeBob SquarePants, Mrs. Lopart in Handy Manny, Mrs. von Hausen in The Boondocks, Marion Cunningham in the Family Guy episode "The Father, the Son, and the Holy Fonz", General Richter in the Superman: The Animated Series episode "Speed Demons", Ms. Wakefield in the King of the Hill episode of the same name, Flavia in The Sylvester & Tweety Mysteries episode "Jeepers Creepers", Grandma Moonbeam in the Scooby-Doo! Mystery Incorporated episode "When the Cicada Calls", Rebecca the Elephant Queen in The Wild Thornberrys episode "Forget Me Not", Doctor Minerva in the Guardians of the Galaxy episode "Gotta Get Outta This Place").

=== November ===
- November 3: Osamu Tezuka, Japanese manga artist and animator (Astro Boy, Kimba the White Lion, Black Jack, Phoenix, Princess Knight, Unico, Message to Adolf, The Amazing 3, Buddha), (d. 1989).
- November 10: Ennio Morricone, Italian composer (Around the World with Peynet's Lovers, Aida of the Trees), (d. 2020).
- November 12: Bob Holness, British-South African radio and television presenter and occasional actor (voice of Mr. Formal in the Rex the Runt episode "Adventures on Telly 1"), (d. 2012).
- November 16:
  - Clu Gulager, American actor and director (voice of Anderson's War Buddy in the Beavis and Butt-Head episode "What's the Deal?"), (d. 2022).
  - Marvin Levy, American film publicist (DreamWorks Pictures, Amblin Entertainment, Columbia Pictures), (d. 2025).
- November 17: Eli Bauer, American comics artist and animator (Terrytoons, Sesame Street), (d. 1998).
- November 23: Elmarie Wendel, American actress and singer (voice of Aunt Grizelda in The Lorax, Beverley Billingsley in the American Dad episode "Stanny Boy and Frantastic"), (d. 2018).

=== December ===
- December 1: Malachi Throne, American actor (voice of God in Animaniacs, Mongke in Avatar: The Last Airbender, Ranakar in Green Lantern: First Flight, Fingers in the Batman Beyond episode "Speak No Evil", The Judge in The New Batman Adventures episode "Judgement Day"), (d. 2013).
- December 10: John Colicos, Canadian actor (voice of Apocalypse in X-Men: The Animated Series), (d. 2000).
- December 11:
  - Peter Firmin, British animator, puppeteer and illustrator (co-creator of Noggin the Nog, Ivor the Engine and Bagpuss), co-founder of Smallfilms, (d. 2018).
  - Kenneth Hyman, American studio executive (Warner Bros.-Seven Arts), (d. 2026).
- December 14: Nikolay Serebryakov, Soviet and Russian director of animated films, (d. 2005).
- December 17:
  - George Lindsey, American actor (voice of Lafayette in The Aristocats, Trigger in Robin Hood, Deadeye in The Rescuers), (d. 2012).
  - Whitney Lee Savage, American animator (Mickey Mouse in Vietnam, Sesame Street), (d. 1998).
- December 25: Dick Miller, American actor (voice of Boxy Bennett in Batman: The Animated Series, Chuckie Sol in Batman: Mask of the Phantasm, Oberon in the Justice League Unlimited episode "The Ties That Bind"), (d. 2019).
- December 28: Bob Holt, American actor (voice of the title character and the Once-ler in The Lorax, Avatar in Wizards, the title characters in The Great Grape Ape Show and The Incredible Hulk, Shadow Demon in Dungeons & Dragons, Cop-Tur in Challenge of the GoBots), (d. 1985).
- December 29: Bernard Cribbins, English actor and singer (portrayed Mr. Masterman in The Water Babies, voice of the Narrator in The Wombles, Christopher's Christmas Mission, Simon in the Land of Chalk Drawings and Edward and Friends, Eel in The Water Babies, Clint Katzenburger in the Dennis and Gnasher episode "Oil Strike!"), (d. 2022).
