= Empty Socks =

1927 film by Walt Disney and Ub Iwerks

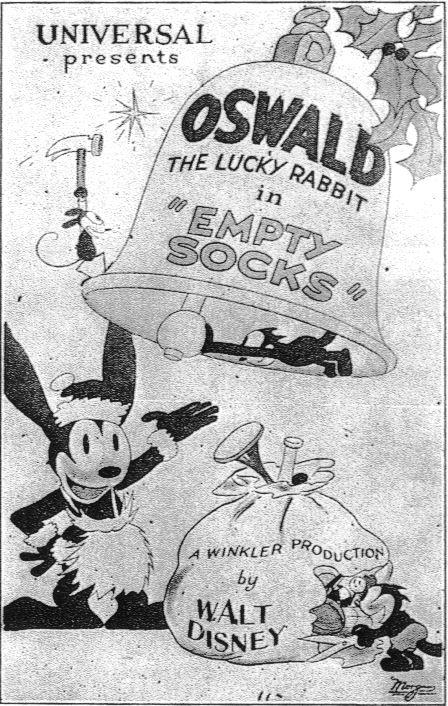
- Theatrical release poster
- Directed by: Walt Disney; Ub Iwerks
- Written by: Walt Disney
- Produced by: Charles Mintz; George Winkler
- Animation by: Hugh Harman; Rollin Hamilton
- Production company: Winkler Pictures
- Distributed by: Universal Pictures
- Release date: December 12, 1927
- Running time: 5:30
- Country: United States
- Language: Silent with English intertitles

Empty Socks is a 1927 American silent animated short film directed by Walt Disney and Ub Iwerks. It was considered a lost film until its rediscovery in Norway in 2014. The film stars Oswald the Lucky Rabbit.

== Plot ==
The short from 1927.

Oswald pretends to be Santa Claus with his horse and visits his girlfriend/wife, Ortensia, who is in an orphanage. Oswald asks his horse to stretch its neck and sees that Ortensia was telling a Christmas story to 20 kittens. Oswald gets off his horse like a playground slide and puts on what was missing from his body, a Santa Claus beard, and Oswald looks at his horse and also fantasizes him as a Santa's reindeer, placing on his head two branches that were on the ground. Oswald whistles at Ortensia and she takes advantage of the fact that the kittens are asleep and sneaks away. The kittens hear Ortensia leaving and follow her. Oswald puts up a ladder in the orphanage and tries to ride his horse up, but his horse is in a pose that causes him to fall. Oswald doesn't like this at all, but then he puts the horse in another pose and they manage to get on. Oswald tries to get in through the chimney, but it looked like two more cups and he couldn't get in, but Oswald makes himself thinner and manages to get in.

Ortensia tells Oswald to be quiet and the horse enters as well. The two tell the horse to be quiet and he walks slowly but in a strange movement, until the horse stumbles and falls to the ground, which knocks over a clock and a bottle in the distance. Oswald and Ortensia get irritated and the horse slips and falls to the ground again and the two get even more irritated and send him be quiet looking at the wall. All the happy kittens look at the door and Oswald pulls a Christmas tree out of his bag.

One of the kittens, who is in pajamas, tries to go down a ladder, but a part of his pajamas falls off, which shows his bottom, and he falls down all the steps, which causes him to be in pain.

Three kittens are playing firefighter, with two firefighters and one victim, who has a real fire. when the firemen arrive, the other one runs to a sink and attaches the hose to the spout of the faucet. One of them asks for water to come out of the hose and the other firefighter turns on the faucet and no water comes out of the hose, he looks at the hose and he takes a shower of water and cannot get the hose back. When he manages to get the hose back, no water comes out again. He calls the other firefighter, pulls the hose forward and water comes out. The fire grows, becoming a blaze and a fire appears in the shape of a hand and grabs one of the firefighters.

All the kittens run from the orphanage and Oswald grabs another hose to throw at the fire. A kitten comes up with the idea to trick Oswald by putting the hose in gasoline and when Oswald shoots it, there is a huge explosion. The house is totally destroyed and Oswald falls from the sky and his rear end starts to catch fire and (it had a cut scene), the film ends.

== Production background ==
The film was directed by Walt Disney while his studio was under contract by Winkler Productions. This short is considered Disney's first Christmas-themed cartoon. Mickey's Orphans (1931) is considered a remake of Empty Socks with a similar story line.

== Rediscovery ==
In December 2014, an almost complete copy of the film, missing about 30 seconds, was discovered in Mo i Rana, Norway. Previously, the only known fragment was a 25-second segment housed at the Museum of Modern Art in New York City. The original short ran about 5:30. The print of Empty Socks was found with a copy of the Oswald cartoon Tall Timber (1928).

The print of Empty Socks belonged to a private individual, before being donated to the collection of the Norwegian Film Institute, which handed over its archive to the National Library of Norway. The library stores most of its documents in a high-security bunker in Mo i Rana.

On December 17, a digitized version of the recovered nitrate film was shown at the National Library of Norway, along with Tall Timber.

== See also ==
- List of Christmas films
- List of rediscovered films
