= Mickey's Choo-Choo =

1929 film by Walt Disney

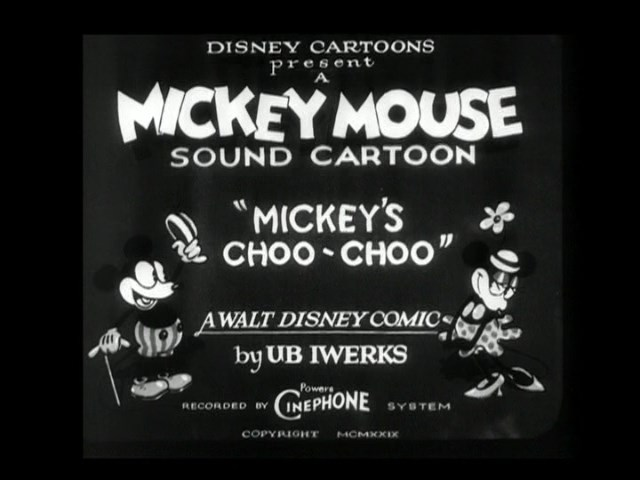
- Directed by: Walt Disney
- Produced by: Walt Disney
- Music by: Carl Stalling
- Animation by: Ub Iwerks
- Color process: Black and white
- Production company: Disney Cartoons
- Distributed by: Celebrity Productions
- Release date: September 26, 1929
- Running time: 7 minutes (one reel)
- Language: English

Mickey's Choo-Choo is a 1929 American animated short film directed by Walt Disney. It is the eleventh film of the Mickey Mouse film series. Ub Iwerks was the animator. It was the eleventh Mickey Mouse short to be produced, the eighth of that year, and was one of the series of early Disney cartoons that led Mickey Mouse to become a national fad by the end of 1929. Columbia Pictures reissued the film after Walt Disney Productions switched distributors. Originally produced in black and white, this cartoon was one of 45 Mickey Mouse cartoons colorized by American Film Technologies in 1991.

== Plot ==
The short

The cartoon opens with Mickey piloting an anthropomorphic 2-2-0 steam engine, ringing his bell and blowing the engine's whistle. As the engine and its coal tender back to collect a boxcar, the engine rests with Mickey, its railroad engineer, fuelling it, and feeding his engine with coal from the tender. As the engine eats too much coal and burps, Mickey decides to have some spaghetti, until Minnie comes along. After Mickey finishes his lunch, Minnie arrives with a fiddle that she can play, and hops onto the freight car. Minnie plays a musical song (Dvořák's Humoresque) while Mickey does the same. Mickey looks at his watch and calls 'All aboard!' to the engine, which whistles in cheerful response after Mickey gets on board. The engine slowly starts out of the station and chuffs cheerfully through the beautiful countryside toward a hill too steep for the engine to make over. Mickey disembarks and tries to push the train over, but the boxcar comes loose from the engine with Minnie still onboard and runs away, defeathers Pete's flock of ducks, chases down and collides with Clarabelle Cow, and wrecks by colliding with a tree. The remnants of the boxcar form a seesaw, which Mickey and Minnie ride like a handcar into the sunset.

== Voice cast ==
- Mickey Mouse: Walt Disney
- Minnie Mouse: Walt Disney

== Production ==
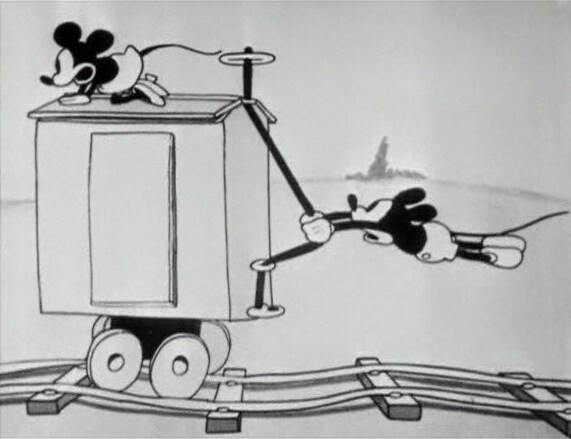
Mickey and Minnie Mouse in the short.

Some of the gags in the cartoon are recycled from the 1927 Oswald the Lucky Rabbit short Trolley Troubles. This is the first cartoon in which Mickey says more than a couple of words, "this time in a voice that sounds like Walt's".

The soundtrack includes Mickey singing "I've Been Working on the Railroad" and playing part of Antonín Dvořák's Humoresques on his spaghetti. Minnie's ride on the train is set to the tune of "Dixie".

The closing image of Mickey and Minnie operating a handcar inspired a famous toy version, manufactured by the Lionel Corporation. The toy was extremely profitable for the company, who credited the toy to have saved them from financial disaster.

== Reception ==
In Mickey's Movies: The Theatrical Films of Mickey Mouse, Gijs Grob writes: "The finale of Mickey's Choo-Choo is remarkably fast and full of action. Moreover, it's the first Disney cartoon to feature real dialogue. Most of the cartoon, however, has a remarkably slow pace, and even some awkwardly silent moments. There's hardly any plot and Mickey and Minnie's designs are inconsistent, ranging from sophisticated (with an extra facial line) to downright poor. The end result is an average entry in Mickey's canon."

Motion Picture News (October 12, 1929) said: "This issue of the Mickey Mouse series by Walt Disney is a laugh from start to finish. In addition to sound effects this one has music and dialogue and a railway thrill with a runaway freight car. The little comedy proved to be the hit of the Strand, New York, bill, topping everything else on the program for laughs and entertainment value."

== Home media ==
The short was released on December 7, 2004 on Walt Disney Treasures: Mickey Mouse in Black and White, Volume Two: 1929–1935.

== See also ==
- Mickey Mouse (film series)
- 1929 in film
