= Sleigh Bells =

Sleigh bells are a type of bell which produces a distinctive 'jingle' sound, especially in large numbers.

Sleigh Bells may refer to:

- Sleigh Bells (band), a band from New York
- Sleigh Bells (film), a 1928 animated film
