= Oh Teacher =

Oh Teacher may refer to:

- Oh Teacher (film), an animated cartoon from 1927 by Walt Disney
- "Oh Teacher", a song by Diana Ross from her 1985 album Eaten Alive (album)
