= Poor Papa =

1928 film by Walt Disney

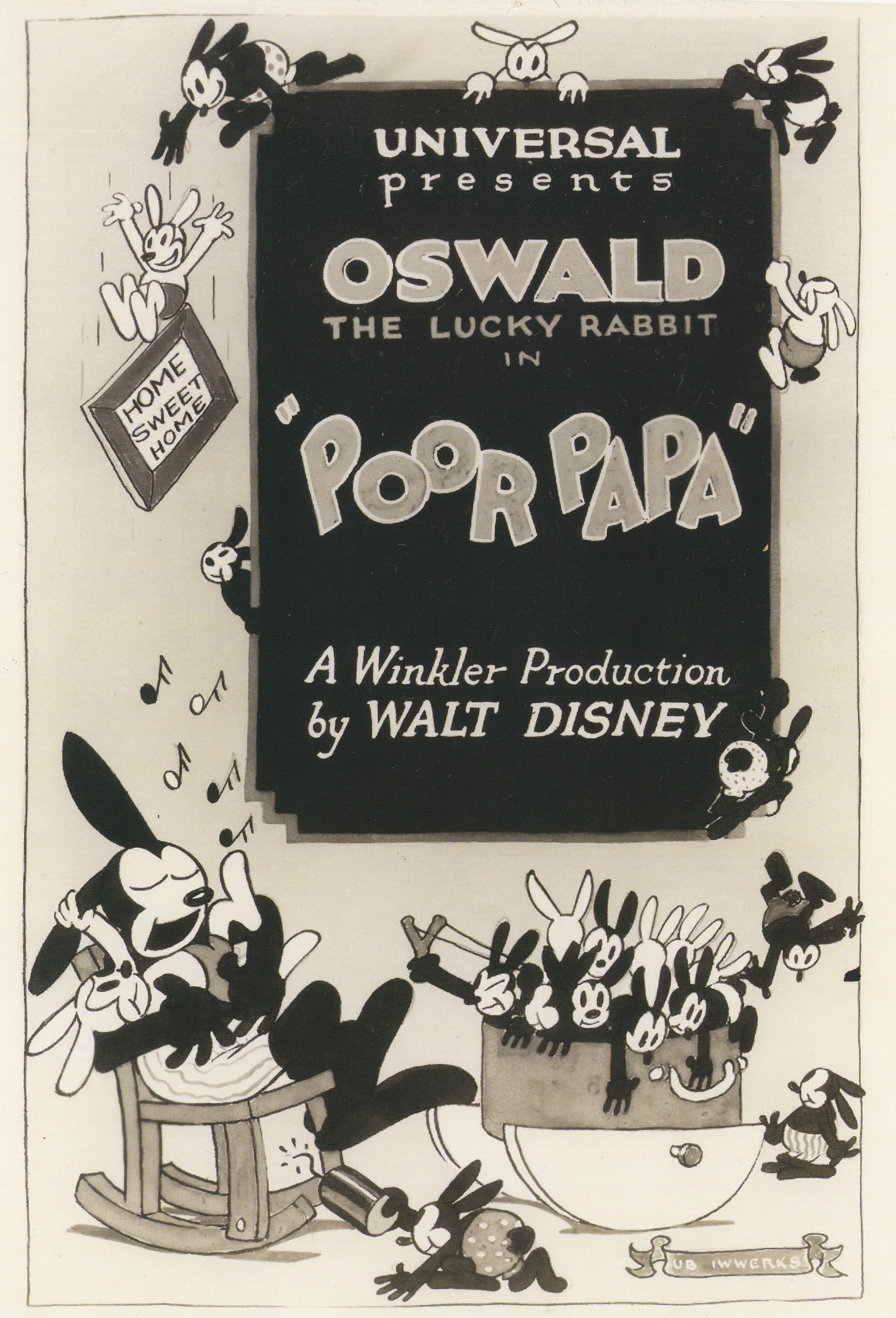
- Poster
- Directed by: Walt Disney
- Story by: Walt Disney
- Produced by: Charles Mintz; George Winkler
- Animation by: Ub Iwerks; Hugh Harman; Rudolf Ising; Les Clark; Friz Freleng; Ben Clopton; Norm Blackburn; Rollin Hamilton
- Color process: Black-and-white
- Production company: Winkler Pictures
- Distributed by: Universal Pictures
- Release date: June 11, 1928
- Running time: 5:11
- Country: United States
- Language: Silent

Poor Papa is a 1928 animated comedy short film directed by Walt Disney. It is the first cartoon produced in 1927 to feature Oswald the Lucky Rabbit, but its release was held back due to Universal Pictures' displeasure over its premise.

== Plot ==
The short

Oswald paces nervously outside a room where his wife is giving birth. A succession of storks fly over the house and drop numerous babies down the chimney. The doctor exits the birthing room, congratulates Oswald and begins to count a large number on his fingers. Oswald stops him and rushes into the room to see his wife in bed with more than 30 babies.

On Saturday night, Oswald washes the children in a barrel and, tying them together, runs the string of them through a wringer and hangs them up to dry. A number of children are playing outside the house. Inside, many children are engaging in destructive activities such as jumping on a piano keyboard, sawing the legs off a table and boring holes in the furniture. Oswald is trying to churn butter but is annoyed by the children's antics. He grabs one and spanks him, but the child runs away and thumbs his nose at Oswald. Another child drops a bar of soap, upon which Oswald slips and falls. Fed up, he grabs a rifle and climbs on the roof. He puts up a "NO VACANCIES" sign. Seeing more storks approaching carrying babies, he shoots at them and drives them away. One drops its load of babies, and they fall through the chimney before Oswald can prevent it. He ties a knot in the chimney, then laughs as the storks are unable to use the chimney, not seeing them drop the babies into the house's open water tank. He turns on the tap to fill a pot and is taken aback when numerous babies pour out of the tap.

== History ==
In the early summer of 1927, Disney finished the cartoon Poor Papa, but Universal was not very satisfied. They had expected a more Charlie Chaplin-like character and thought Oswald was too elderly and too fat. Disney agreed to make some changes and the cartoon was not released in theatres at the time. Disney made a second Oswald cartoon known as Trolley Troubles, which was released instead and well received.

As for Poor Papa, it too eventually released in theatres, although Universal held it back until 1928. In total, nine Oswald cartoons were released in 1927.

Some elements of Poor Papa were later reused in the Mickey Mouse short Mickey's Nightmare.

== Preservation status ==
After its release, Poor Papa was believed to be lost for many years, until around in the 2000s, where three incomplete surviving copies were found in the United Kingdom. All three copies were sold to private collectors.

In 2007, Disney attempted to purchase one of the three copies during production of The Adventures of Oswald the Lucky Rabbit DVD, but failed. Later, in 2015, Disney found a complete copy of the cartoon in a private collection. It was then restored and Poor Papa was finally released as a bonus feature in the Blu-Ray "Signature Edition" of Pinocchio.
