= The Haunted House (1929 film) =

1929 film by Jack King

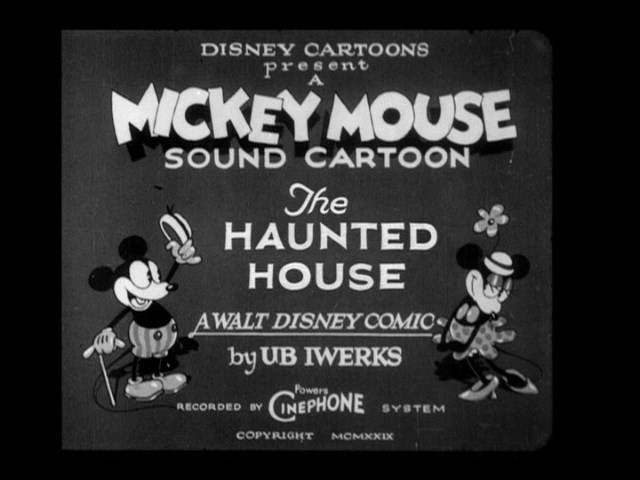
- Directed by: Jack King
- Produced by: Walt Disney
- Starring: Walt Disney
- Music by: Carl Stalling
- Animation by: Ub Iwerks
- Color process: Black-and-white
- Production company: Disney Cartoons
- Distributed by: Celebrity Productions
- Release date: December 2, 1929
- Running time: 7 minutes
- Country: United States
- Language: English

The Haunted House, also known as Haunted House, is a 1929 American animated comedy horror short film directed by Jack King. It is the fourteenth film of the Mickey Mouse series and the first film to be directed by King, who would become a prominent director in the company. It was the fourteenth Mickey Mouse short to be produced, the eleventh of that year. It follows Mickey Mouse who is trapped in a haunted house and forced to play music. It was directed by Walt Disney who also provided the voice of Mickey; Ub Iwerks was the primary animator and Carl Stalling wrote the original music. It was released on December 2, 1929 by Celebrity Productions. Columbia Pictures reissued the film after Walt Disney Productions switched distributors.

The Haunted House borrows animation from Disney's first Silly Symphony cartoon, The Skeleton Dance, which was released earlier in 1929, although most of the sequence is new. The Haunted House was Mickey's first cartoon with a horror theme and led the way to later films such as The Gorilla Mystery (1930) and The Mad Doctor (1933). Disney had some trouble with the state censors over this cartoon, because of the gags involving a chamber pot and an outhouse.

As a published work from 1929, The Haunted House entered the U.S. public domain on January 1, 2025.

== Plot ==
The short.

On a dark and stormy night, Mickey Mouse takes shelter in a sinister-looking house. Knocking on the porch door and receiving no answer, he pulls on the door knob and the entire porch collapses. Apprehensively peering through the open front door, he enters and the door locks itself behind him. Visibly frightened, Mickey is then startled by several bats flying from holes in the wall. A large spider descends from the ceiling, causing him to hide in a chamber pot. Climbing out of the chamber pot, Mickey hears howls and clattering, and flees into a hallway before the lights of a chandelier go out. He shouts three times in the dark, lights a match, and looks around. A shadow of a cloaked figure appears in his shadow. Dizzy with fear, Mickey screams, panics, and flees in fright, but is pursued by the figure, who makes growling noises. The cloaked figure corners Mickey in a room and lifts its hood, revealing itself as a skeleton ghost. It and several other skeletons compel Mickey to play the organ while they dance along to the music, one of them using a radiator as an accordion. When Mickey finishes playing, he sneaks away and tries to escape, but is spotted by the skeletons. As he runs and tries to open a door, the doorknob is revealed as a skeleton hand, which grips Mickey and shakes him. Running up a staircase, Mickey bumps into two more skeletons in a bed, then dives out of a window and into a barrel full of skeletons, which raise their hands menacingly at him. He runs up to an outhouse and frantically tries to open the door, hoping to hide, but a skeleton occupying the toilet spooks him. The skeleton slams the outhouse door closed as a terrified Mickey runs away.

== Reception ==
On the 2004 Walt Disney Treasures DVD set Mickey Mouse in Black and White: Volume Two, The Haunted House is in the bonus-features "From the Vault" section, which begins with an introduction by film historian Leonard Maltin explaining the origins of racial stereotypes seen in Disney cartoons of the 30s and 40s. The Haunted House is included in that group because of Mickey's "Mammy!" impression, which refers to Al Jolson's famous blackface performance, "My Mammy". The 1931 short The Moose Hunt is also included in that section because of a similar gag featuring Pluto.

On the Disney Film Project, Ryan Kirkpatrick praises this short as a step forward in the series' sophistication: "The Haunted House breaks the formula of putting Mickey into a setting and having the music start immediately. Instead, it starts with an establishing shot of the titular house, which looks like a menacing face on the horizon. Then we see Mickey struggling through a storm trying to reach the house. The music, the rain animation, and the blowing wind that moves the objects in the foreground all help to give a sense of foreboding."

In his book Mickey's Movies: The Theatrical Films of Mickey Mouse, Gijs Grob disagrees: "Mickey's role in this short is limited, and his only function is as the carrier of the audience's fear. Indeed, he looks repeatedly into the camera for sympathy, dragging us into the haunted house with him. The early scenes of this cartoon manage to evoke a genuine feel of horror, but in the end the short resembles the boring song-and-dance routines of both the early Mickey Mouse and Silly Symphony series too much to be a standout."

Motion Picture News (January 4, 1930) said: "As the title indicates, a haunted house furnishes the background for this subject of the popular Mickey Mouse series. It has plenty of weird stuff capped by a burlesque of Al Jolson's Mammy line, that is a darb, and should bring down any house."

Film Daily (January 5, 1930) wrote: "The 'creeper' idea, as the title implies, injected into a Mickey Mouse comic, with the usual storm, lightning ghosts, dancing skeletons, etc. Also a flash simulation of Al Jolson, produced by a black-and-white character silhouette, with a simultaneous cry of 'Mammy', that is a knockout."

Variety (February 12, 1930) said: "Another comedy wow. Joins Ub Iwerks' highly imaginative comedy conceptions with sound effects. Mickey Mouse in a haunted villa is fast with laughs throughout. Culminates in Mickey being compelled to play an eerie organ while a ballet of skeletons dance weird capers. Delightfully mad, this short can be added to any bill and improve it thereby."

== Releases ==
- 1929 - theatrical release
- c. 1992 - Mickey's Mouse Tracks: Episode 25
- 1998 - The Ink & Paint Club: "Oooh! Scary!"

== Home media ==
The short was released on December 7, 2004 on Walt Disney Treasures: Mickey Mouse in Black and White, Volume Two: 1929-1935.

Additional releases include:

- 1983 - Walt Disney Cartoon Classics: "Scary Tales" (VHS)

== See also ==
- Mickey Mouse (film series)
