= Sinbad the Sailor (1935 film) =

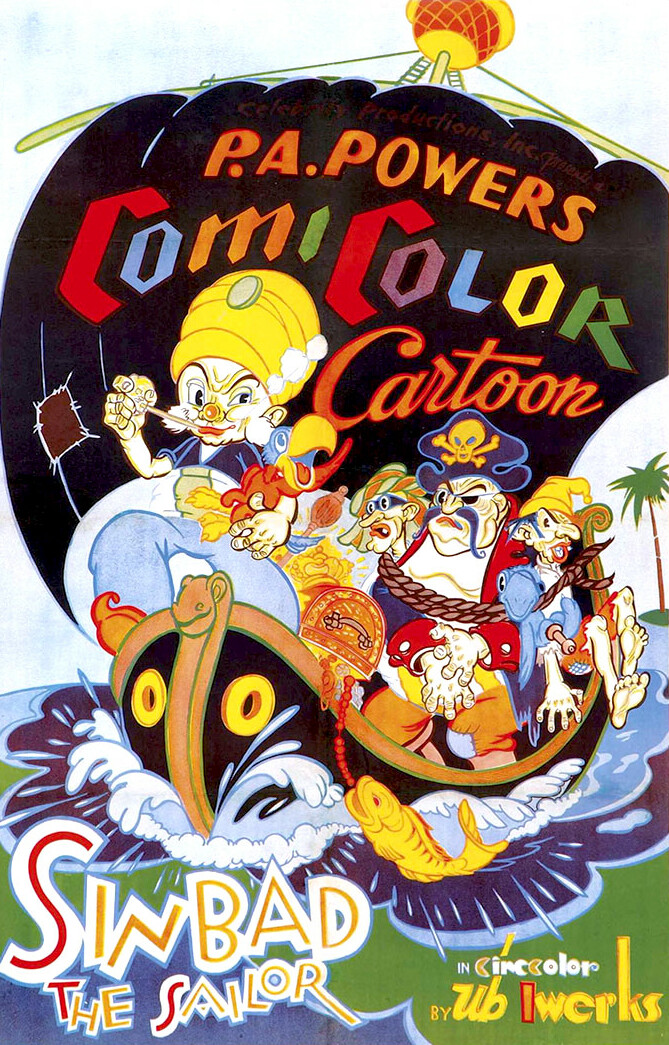
- Sinbad the Sailor theatrical poster
- Directed by: Ub Iwerks (uncredited)
- Produced by: Ub Iwerks
- Music by: Carl W. Stalling
- Production company: The Ub Iwerks Studio
- Distributed by: Celebrity Pictures
- Release date: July 30, 1935 (U.S.)
- Running time: 7:30
- Country: United States
- Language: English

The Cartoon

Sinbad the Sailor is a 1935 animated short film produced and directed by Ub Iwerks part of the ComiColor Cartoons series.

== Synopsis ==
The cartoon begins with the legendary Sinbad the Sailor overlooking the seas with his faithful parrot from atop the crow's nest of a merchant ship. Suddenly, he spots a group of nefarious pirates and their captain singing a shanty. He rallies his crew for retreat, but the pirates discover them and plan to steal their treasure. First they shoot their cannons at them, but Sinbad bats their cannonballs back and destroys them. Then their captain catches their ship with an anchor and the two crews engage each other in battle while their captains and their parrots duel it out. The pirate captain finds himself outnumbered, but then he uses a cannonball as a bowling ball to defeat Sinbad's crew. The sailor is tied up and forced to walk the plank into the ocean.

Luckily, Sinbad's parrot saves him before he drowns and he manages to swim ashore to a deserted island, where he hallucinates dancing hula girls. He then finds the same pirates planning to bury the treasure on the island and tricks them into fighting each other by throwing coconuts at their heads from atop a tree, but is then thrown off by an angry ape and discovered. The pirates tie him to a tree and begin tormenting him until realizing that the tree was actually the leg of a giant, fire-breathing roc, who overpowers the pirates. The captain retaliates by throwing the treasure chest at it, but the roc catches it in its beak and flies away with Sinbad still attached. Sinbad's parrot unties him and forces the roc to drop the treasure by destroying its tail-feathers. Sinbad activates a parachute in his hat and lands safely on his own ship with the treasure. He and his parrot then enjoy their victory with cigars until they realize they were the kind that explode.

== See also ==
- ComiColor Cartoons

== Preservation ==
Sinbad the Sailor was preserved and restored by the UCLA Film and Television Archive. The restoration premiered at the UCLA Festival of Preservation in 2022. Restoration funding was provided by ASIFA-Hollywood.
