= Africa Before Dark =

1928 film by Walt Disney and Ub Iwerks

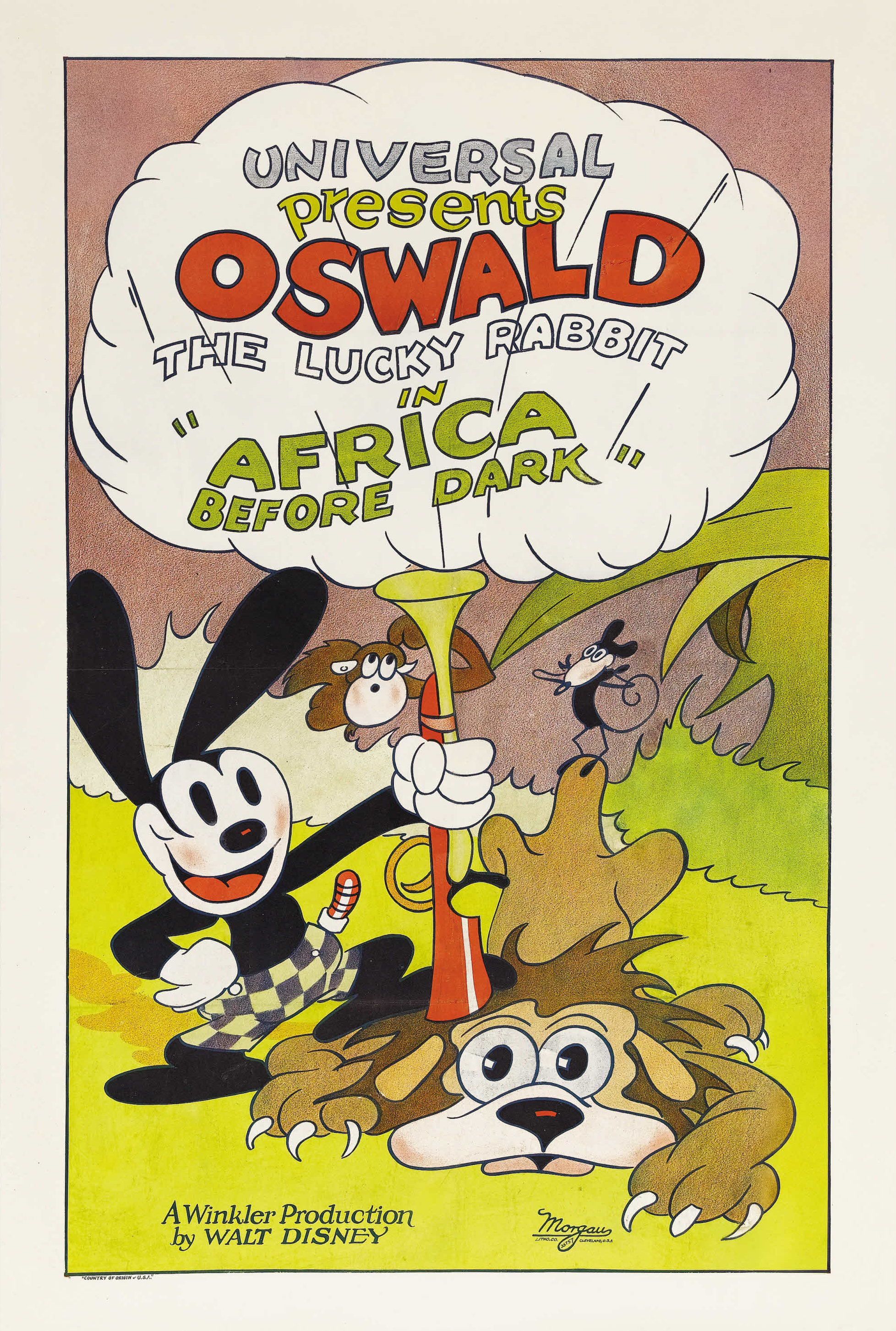
- Poster
- Directed by: Walt Disney; Ub Iwerks
- Story by: Walt Disney; Ub Iwerks
- Produced by: Charles Mintz; George Winkler
- Animation by: Ub Iwerks; Hugh Harman; Friz Freleng; Les Clark; Rollin Hamilton
- Color process: Black-and-white
- Production company: Winkler Pictures
- Distributed by: Universal Pictures
- Release date: February 20, 1928
- Running time: 6 minutes
- Country: United States
- Language: Silent

Africa Before Dark is a 1928 American animated comedy short film directed by Walt Disney and Ub Iwerks. It features Oswald the Lucky Rabbit.

== Plot summary ==
Full short

Oswald is big-game hunting in Africa, and is riding an elephant, which is itself riding a bicycle. The elephant crashes into a rock, tips onto its trunk, and then accidentally sits on Oswald, crushing him flat. The elephant blows air into Oswald, reinflating him. A variety of African animals are playing games, including two monkeys playing tic-tac-toe on a tiger's back. Oswald stealthily approaches with a rifle and shoots numerous shots at the animals, who all vanish. An owl laughs at Oswald, and angered, he shoots the owl. A baby tiger approaches Oswald, kicks him and runs away. Oswald chases it and the tiger runs into a burrow in the ground. Oswald tries to shoot it but the tiger redirects his rifle so that Oswald shoots himself. The tiger runs into a hollow log and Oswald produces an enormous handgun. Instead of the baby tiger, several huge lions emerge from the log, and Oswald's gun dwindles into a tiny pop-gun. Oswald runs away, chased by the lions. He leaps onto his elephant's back and they continue to run from the lions. The elephant then flaps his ears and flies away, carrying Oswald to safety.

== Releases ==
The short was released on February 20, 1928, by Universal Pictures.

The film was thought to be lost before a fragment was discovered in 2009 and later a full copy was found at the Austrian Film Museum in Vienna. The film was restored by Walt Disney Animation Studios and shown at a screening on June 13, 2015, with live orchestration provided by the Los Angeles Chamber Orchestra.

It was released as a bonus item on the 2017 Blu-ray release of Bambi.
