= Walt Disney Treasures: Wave Seven =

Digital video disc collection

The seventh wave of Walt Disney Treasures was released on December 11, 2007.

== The Chronological Donald, Volume Three ==

The third volume on Donald Duck. 50,000 sets were produced.

=== Disc one ===
==== 1947 ====
- Straight Shooters, April 18, 1947
- Sleepy Time Donald, May 9, 1947
- Donald's Dilemma, July 11, 1947
- Crazy with the Heat, August 1, 1947 (in a Donald & Goofy cartoon)
- Bootle Beetle, August 22, 1947
- Wide Open Spaces, September 12, 1947
- Chip an' Dale, November 28, 1947

==== 1948 ====
- Drip Dippy Donald, March 5, 1948
- Daddy Duck, April 16, 1948
- Donald's Dream Voice, May 21, 1948
- The Trial of Donald Duck, July 30, 1948
- Inferior Decorator, August 27, 1948
- Soup's On, October 15, 1948

==== From the vault ====
- Clown of the Jungle, June 20, 1947
- Three for Breakfast, November 5, 1948
- Tea for Two Hundred, December 24, 1948

==== Bonus features ====
- The Many Faces of Donald Duck: Leonard Maltin interviews film historians and Disney crew members of Donald's importance to Disney. Much is said of his extensive film career, such as his appearances in films like The Three Caballeros, Who Framed Roger Rabbit and Fantasia 2000, as well as appearances on the Walt Disney anthology series on television.
- Donald on the Mickey Mouse Club: Maltin explains how each week on The Mickey Mouse Club, the classic opening theme sequence would end with a gag involving Donald and the gong he is supposed to strike. Ten of those fifteen gags (complete with the opening) are scattered about this set as Easter eggs with five eggs on each disc.
- Galleries: On both discs are a set of galleries containing each of the respective discs' cartoons' storyboards and background paintings.

=== Disc two ===
==== 1949 ====
- Sea Salts, April 8, 1949
- Winter Storage, June 3, 1949
- Honey Harvester, August 5, 1949
- All in a Nutshell, September 2, 1949
- The Greener Yard, October 14, 1949
- Slide, Donald, Slide, November 25, 1949
- Toy Tinkers, December 16, 1949

==== 1950 ====
- Lion Around, January 20, 1950
- Crazy Over Daisy, March 24, 1950
- Trailer Horn, April 28, 1950
- Hook, Lion & Sinker, September 1, 1950
- Out On A Limb, December 15, 1950

==== From the vault ====
- Donald's Happy Birthday, February 11, 1949
- Bee At The Beach, October 13, 1950

==== Bonus features ====
- Sculpting Donald Leonard Maltin meets with acclaimed Disney sculptor Ruben Procopio, who demonstrates how to transfer a flat 2D character like Donald into 3D. He also discusses his background and how his father influenced his work.
- Donald on the Mickey Mouse Club: Same as Disc One.
- Galleries: On both discs are a set of galleries containing each of the respective discs' cartoons' storyboards and background paintings.

== The Adventures of Oswald the Lucky Rabbit ==
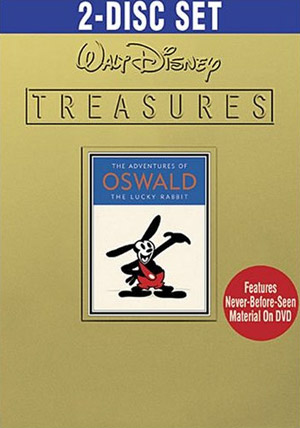

Disney produced 27 Oswald the Lucky Rabbit cartoons, but this set contains only the 13 episodes that were accessible for release. A further seven Oswald cartoons were subsequently recovered by the studio in efforts overseen by the Disney historian Dave Bossert.

120,000 sets were produced.

=== Disc one ===
==== 1927 ====
- Introduction by film author and historian Leonard Maltin
- Trolley Troubles
- Oh Teacher
  (Available with commentary by Mark Kausler in "Bonus Material")
- The Mechanical Cow
- Great Guns!
- All Wet
- The Ocean Hop
  (Available with commentary by Mark Kausler in "Bonus Material")

==== 1928 ====
- Rival Romeos
- Bright Lights
  (Available with commentary by Leonard Maltin and Jerry Beck in "Bonus Material")
- Ozzie of the Mounted
  (Available with commentary by Jerry Beck in "Bonus Material")
- Oh What a Knight
  (Available with commentary by Leonard Maltin and Mark Kausler in "Bonus Material")
- The Sky Scrapper
  (Titled Sky Scrappers)
- The Fox Chase
  (Available with commentary by Jerry Beck in "Bonus Material")
- Tall Timber

==== Bonus material ====
- Oswald Comes Home Documentary on how Oswald, the Lucky Rabbit returned to the Walt Disney Company's ownership, hosted by Leonard Maltin.
- Audio Commentaries
- Sagebrush Sadie (Fragment)
- Still Frame Galleries

=== Disc two ===
==== Documentary ====
- The Hand Behind The Mouse: The Ub Iwerks Story, a 1999 documentary that was written, produced and directed by Ub Iwerks' granddaughter Leslie Iwerks.

==== "The Work of Ub Iwerks" ====
- Before Oswald
  - Alice Gets Stung
  - Alice in the Wooly West
  - Alice's Balloon Race
- After Oswald
  - Plane Crazy
  - Steamboat Willie
  - Skeleton Dance

== Disneyland: Secrets, Stories and Magic ==

Documentary films about Disneyland. 50,000 sets were produced.

=== Disc One ===
==== Documentaries ====
- Disneyland: Secrets, Stories and Magic of the Happiest Place on Earth: An 81 minute documentary of the park, produced in 2005 during the 50th anniversary of Disneyland.
- Wonderful World of Disneyland Trivia Game
- People and Places: Disneyland U.S.A.: a 42-minute theatrically-released, two-reel 1956 CinemaScope film that showcases the then newly opened Disneyland.
  - Available with Optional Audio Commentary track by Leonard Maltin and Tony Baxter
  - Available with Optional Music-Only Track

=== Disc Two ===
==== Documentaries ====
- Operation Disneyland: A behind the scenes look at the preparations for the live broadcast of the opening of Disneyland, filmed for ABC in July 1955.
- The Golden Horseshoe Revue: An episode of Wonderful World of Color featuring the 10,000th performance of The Golden Horseshoe Revue. Aired on September 23, 1962.
- Disneyland Goes to the World's Fair: An episode of Wonderful World of Color featuring Walt Disney's presence at the 1964 New York World's Fair. Aired May 17, 1964.
- Disneyland Around the Seasons: An episode of Wonderful World of Color featuring new additions to the park, such as It's a Small World, New Orleans Square and Great Moments with Mr. Lincoln. Aired December 18, 1966 (three days after Walt Disney's death).

==== Bonus features ====
- Building Walt's Dream: Disneyland Under Construction: Rare behind-the-scenes footage of Disneyland being constructed with commentary by Imagineers Tony Baxter, Ed Holberman and Walter Magnesium.
- Gallery

== Bibliography ==
- Cotter, Bill (2003) [1997]. The Wonderful World of Disney Television. New York: Hyperion. ISBN 0-766-99584-4.
