= Trolley Troubles =

1927 film by Walt Disney

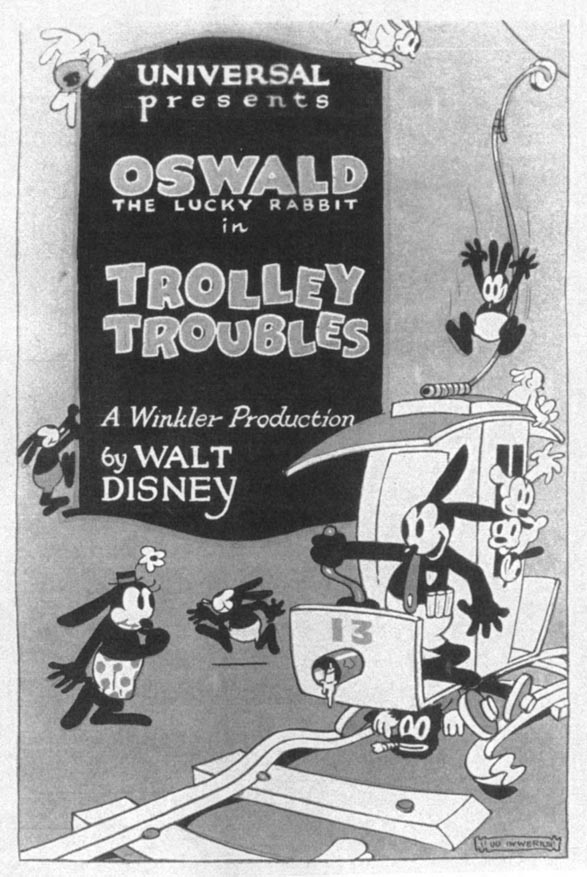
- Theatrical release poster
- Directed by: Walt Disney
- Story by: Walt Disney
- Produced by: Charles Mintz; George Winkler
- Animation by: Ub Iwerks; Hugh Harman; Les Clark; Friz Freleng; Ben Clopton; Norm Blackburn; Rollin "Ham" Hamilton
- Color process: Black-and-white
- Production company: Winkler Pictures
- Distributed by: Universal Pictures
- Release date: September 5, 1927
- Running time: 6:16
- Country: United States

Trolley Troubles is a 1927 animated short film directed by Walt Disney. It is the first film featuring Oswald the Lucky Rabbit, a character that Disney and Ub Iwerks created for Winkler Pictures. Released on September 5, 1927 by Universal Pictures, it was a critical and commercial success, launching the careers of Disney and his animators and establishing Winkler Pictures as a major studio in the golden age of American animation; Oswald would serve as Universal's lead cartoon star for a decade.

== Plot ==
The short film.

Oswald is preparing a trolley to transport his bunny kids and other animal characters. He encounters a stubborn cow who walks onto the tracks and refuses to move until Oswald drives the trolley underneath her, angering her as Oswald mocks her. Oswald then arrives at a steep hill. Oswald finds a stubborn goat, who he baits with a stick to push the trolley up the hill.

The trolley unexpectedly goes onto a bumpy road, tossing the animals out of the trolley to their demise. Oswald prays to God and detaches his foot, kisses it and rubs it on his head for good luck. Eventually, the trolley crashes into a river. Having been spared from certain death, Oswald uses a big stick to row it downstream like a raft.

== Production ==
In the early summer of 1927, Walt Disney finished the first Oswald cartoon, entitled Poor Papa, but Universal was not satisfied by its quality. They had expected a more Charlie Chaplin-like character and thought Oswald was too elderly and too fat. Disney agreed to make some changes and the cartoon was not released in theatres at the time. It is possible that the film was inspired by The Toonerville Trolley (1920) short film based on the Toonerville Folks newspaper cartoon.

Instead, Oswald's second-produced cartoon was submitted for release: Trolley Troubles. Universal was pleased and the short was released by Universal on September 5, 1927.

The press loved the new cartoon series, and Oswald became a popular character. From then on, a new cartoon was released every two weeks.

The cartoon was reissued on November 23, 1931, after Walter Lantz Productions took over the Oswald series. This re-release was completed with music and sound effects in an attempt to compete with Columbia Pictures and Walt Disney Productions' Mickey Mouse series.

The copyright for Trolley Troubles expired in 1955 due to neglect by Universal Pictures.

== Home media ==
After The Walt Disney Company purchased the rights to Oswald and the Disney-era films in 2006, the short was released on December 11, 2007, on Walt Disney Treasures: The Adventures of Oswald the Lucky Rabbit. A restored version of the short was released on Disney+ on September 7, 2023, as part of Disney's 100th anniversary.
