= Bright Lights (1928 film) =

1928 film by Walt Disney

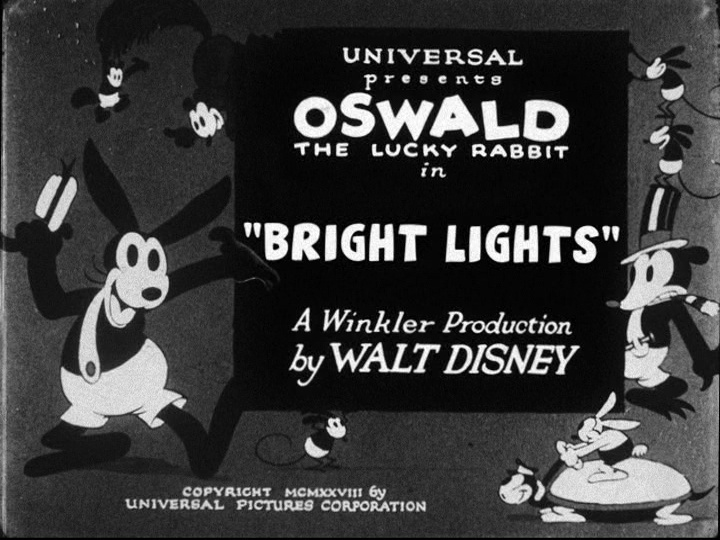
- Title card
- Directed by: Walt Disney
- Story by: Walt Disney
- Produced by: Charles Mintz; George Winkler
- Animation by: Ub Iwerks; Rollin Hamilton
- Color process: Black and white
- Production company: Winkler Pictures
- Distributed by: Universal Pictures
- Release date: March 19, 1928
- Running time: 7 minutes
- Language: Silent

Bright Lights is a 1928 American silent animated comedy short film directed by Walt Disney. It features Oswald the Lucky Rabbit.

== Overview ==
Previously in 1927, Oswald had an oval face, a chubbier waist, and pants with a single suspender. By 1928, he is given a makeover with a rounder head, slimmer waist, and shorts. Despite this change, the rabbit's 1927 appearance remained on the title cards until High Up. His shorts would be his only outfit until 1930.

== Plot ==
Full short

A show composed of a concert, Broadway, and circus acts is taking place at a theater in the city. One of the stars of the show is a lady cat dancer, for whom Oswald develops sudden affection upon seeing a poster. The show's admission is 50 cents, but Oswald's pockets are empty.

Oswald notices a stage entrance where performers and certain officials can enter the theater without paying admission. Oswald then comes up with an idea of impersonating a performer by bulging his chest (possibly pretending to be a stuntman). The guard by the door is not deceived and prevents the penniless rabbit from entering. After a bit of a struggle, Oswald then ties the guard to a lamp post and proceeds toward the inside of the theater. However, Oswald is forced back outside by a group of glaring performers.

While strategizing his way back in, Oswald sees a man in a thick fur coat exiting a taxi and heading towards the theater entrance. Oswald attempts to hide under the man's shadow. As the man with the coat enters, the guard becomes suspicious upon noticing a lump on the shadow. Thinking he made it inside undetected, Oswald reappears from the shadow without noticing the guard approaching. When he realizes the guard is right behind him, Oswald quickly makes his move.

Oswald successfully loses the guard by entering a cage, but there is a jaguar in it. The jaguar chases him into the stage where acrobats are performing a balancing act with a long pole. Oswald climbs up the pole and grabs the ceiling for his safety. One of the acrobats follows him up the pole and clings onto the rabbit's legs. Bothered by his new companion, Oswald grabs a mallet and strikes the acrobat. Oswald plunges down and drops on the jaguar. The jaguar gets even angrier and the frightened Oswald flees the stage.

Other vicious animals, such as lions, then break out of their cages and force everyone else to leave the theater. Oswald then appears out of a toilet booth, believing everyone disappeared from the scene, only to realize that a lion is still nearby. The lion then chases him into the horizon as the cartoon ends.

== Home media ==
The short was released on December 11, 2007 on Walt Disney Treasures: The Adventures of Oswald the Lucky Rabbit.

== See also ==
- Oswald the Lucky Rabbit filmography
