= Ub Iwerks =

American animator, producer and special effects technician (1901–1971)

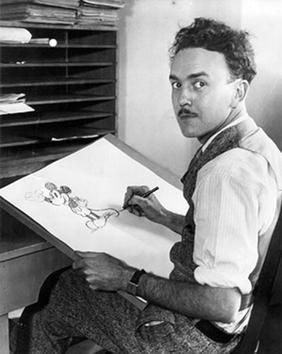
- Iwerks animating his most famous co-creation, Mickey Mouse c. 1929
- Born: Ubbe Ert Iwwerks; March 24, 1901; Kansas City, Missouri, U.S.
- Died: July 7, 1971 (aged 70); Burbank, California, U.S.
- Resting place: Forest Lawn – Hollywood Hills Cemetery (ashes)
- Occupations: Animator; cartoonist; film producer; inventor; special and visual effects technician
- Years active: 1919–1971
- Employers: Screen Gems (1923–1928, 1936–1940); Walt Disney Productions (1928–1930, 1940–1964); Animated Pictures (1930–1937); Leon Schlesinger Productions (1937); Cartoon Films Limited (1937–1940)
- Notable work: Oswald the Lucky Rabbit; Mickey Mouse; Flip the Frog
- Spouse: Mildred Sarah Hederson (m. c. 1926)
- Children: Don; David
- Relatives: Leslie Iwerks (granddaughter)

Signature
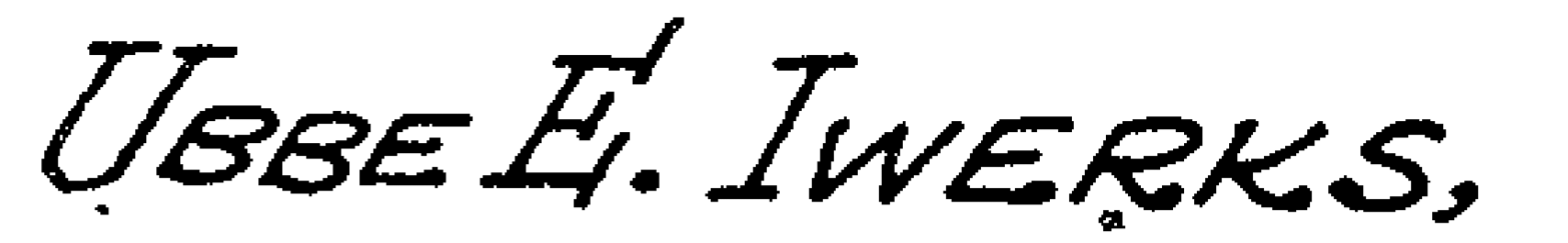

Ub Iwerks (/ʌb ˈaɪwɜːrks/ ub EYE-wurks; born Ubbe Ert Iwwerks, March 24, 1901 – July 7, 1971) was an American animator, cartoonist, film director, film producer, character designer, inventor, and special effects technician. He was widely known for his early work with Walt Disney Productions, especially for having worked on the creation of Mickey Mouse and Oswald the Lucky Rabbit, among other characters.

Iwerks met Walt Disney in 1919 while working at an art studio in Kansas City, Missouri. After briefly working as illustrators for a local newspaper company, they ventured into animation together. Iwerks joined Disney as chief animator on the Laugh-O-Gram shorts series beginning in 1922, but a studio bankruptcy would cause Disney to relocate to Los Angeles in 1923. At Winkler Pictures, Iwerks continued to work with Disney on the Alice Comedies as well as the creation of Oswald the Lucky Rabbit. One of Iwerks's most long-lasting contributions to animation was a refined version of a sketch drawn by Disney that would later go on to become Mickey Mouse. Iwerks was responsible for much of the animation for the early Mickey Mouse and Silly Symphony cartoons, including Steamboat Willie, The Skeleton Dance and The Haunted House, before a falling out with Disney led to Iwerks's resignation from the studio in January 1930.

Following his separation with Disney, Iwerks founded Animated Pictures and produced the Flip the Frog and Willie Whopper series as part of a contract between Celebrity Productions and Metro-Goldwyn-Mayer, but the new studio failed to rival its competitors. An independent series of Cinecolor ComiColor Cartoons were also not successful in the long term. The studio was later reorganized in 1937. Subsequently, Iwerks directed two Looney Tunes cartoon shorts for Leon Schlesinger Productions and over a dozen Color Rhapsody cartoons for Screen Gems from his studio as contract work before joining Disney again in 1940. As head of Disney's Special Processes and Camera department, Iwerks developed visual effects processes on productions such as Song of the South (1946), Mary Poppins (1964), and Alfred Hitchcock's The Birds (1963). He also adapted the xerography process to be able to photocopy animation pencil drawings onto animation cels and contributed technical solutions to Disney's WED Enterprises group (now Walt Disney Imagineering) for Disneyland, Walt Disney World, and 1964 World's Fair attractions.

Iwerks had two children, Donald Warren and David Lee, with his wife Mildred Sarah Henderson. Iwerks died of a heart attack in Burbank, California, in 1971 at age 70. Iwerks was posthumously named a Disney Legend in 1989. His likeness has been featured in his granddaughter Leslie Iwerks' 1999 documentary The Hand Behind the Mouse: The Ub Iwerks Story as well as the 2014 feature film Walt Before Mickey, in which he is portrayed by Armando Gutierrez. Iwerks received nominations for three Academy Awards, for which he won two. He also posthumously received the Winsor McCay Award at the 1978 Annie Awards and the Hall of Fame award at the 2017 Visual Effects Society Awards. Iwerks is considered one of the greatest animators of all time.

== Early life ==
Iwerks was born Ubbe Ert Iwwerks in Kansas City, Missouri. His father, Ert Ubbén Iwwerks, was born in the village of Uttum in East Frisia (northwest Germany, today part of the municipality of Krummhörn) and immigrated to the United States in 1869 around the age of 14. The elder Iwwerks, who worked as a barber, had abandoned several previous wives and children. When Ub Iwerks was a teenager, his father abandoned him as well, forcing the boy to drop out of school and work to support his mother. Iwerks despised his father and never spoke of or saw him again; upon learning that he had died, he reportedly said, "Throw him in a ditch." Years later, when Iwerks's son Don asked about his grandfather, Ub stopped Don, telling him "We don't talk about that."

Ub Iwerks attended Ashland Grammar School, graduating in 1914. Ub's full name, Ubbe Ert Iwwerks, can be seen on early Alice Comedies that he signed. After moving to Hollywood in 1924, he began simplifying his name to "Ub Iwerks", sometimes written as "U.B. Iwerks", (Note: For example in the opening credits of Little Black Sambo (1935)) and legally changed his name to "Ub Iwerks" in 1926.

== Career ==
=== Early work with Walt Disney (1919–1926) ===
Iwerks spent most of his career working with or for Walt Disney. The two met in 1919 while working for the Pesmen-Rubin Art Studio in Kansas City, and eventually started their own commercial art business together. Disney and Iwerks then found work as illustrators for the Kansas City Slide Newspaper Company (which was later named The Kansas City Film Ad Company). While working for the Kansas City Film Ad Company, Disney decided to take up work in animation, and Iwerks soon joined him.

At Kansas City Film Ad, Iwerks displayed what became a life-long devotion to mechanics and invention. To make the process of photographing the animation drawings more efficient, Iwerks attached a motor drive to the animation camera with a switch that resembled a telegraph key. This allowed the camera to be operated by a single seated person who could both photograph the drawings and switch out and adjust the drawings - without requiring a second person to stand and work the camera.

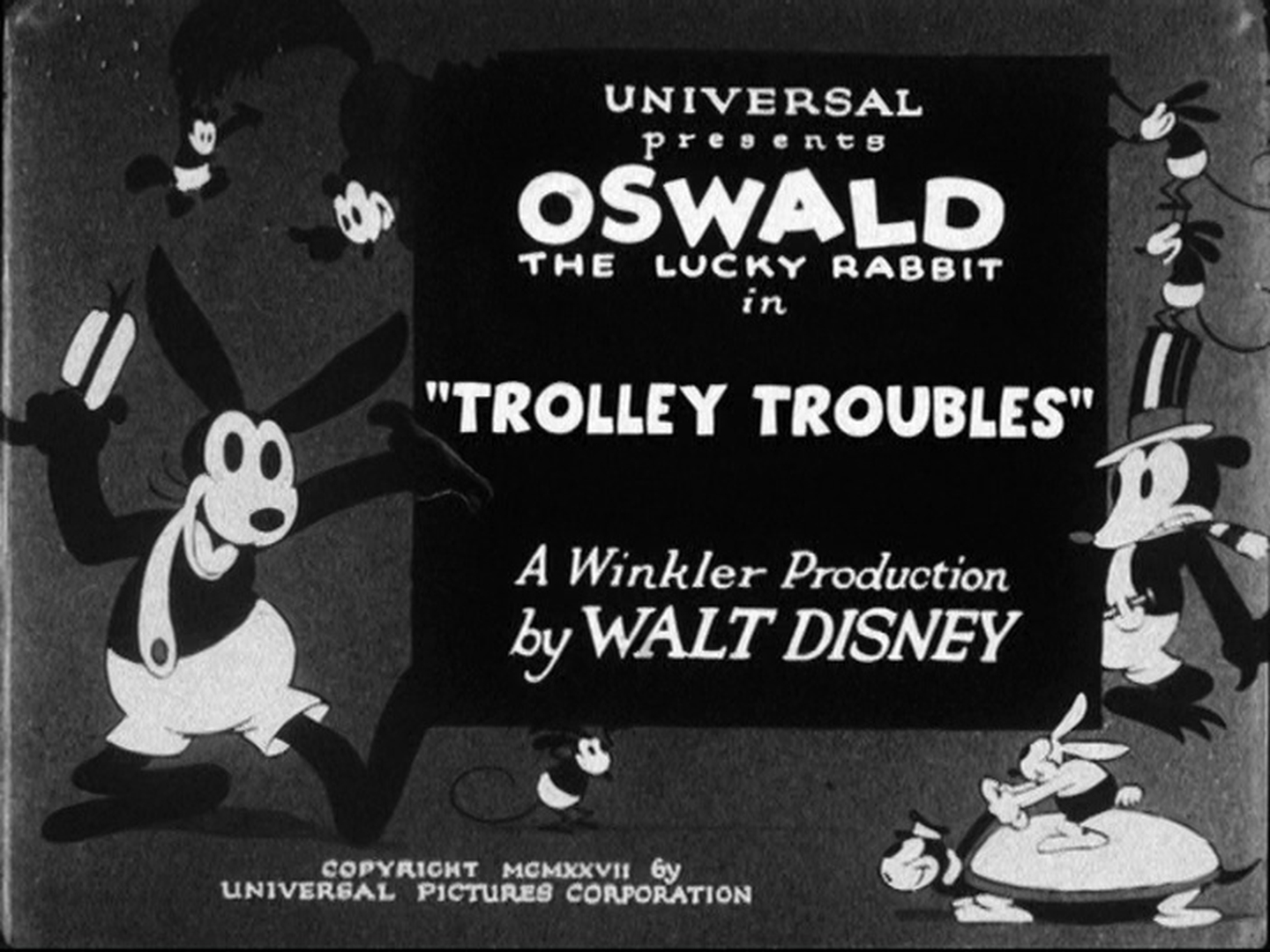
The title card for Trolley Troubles (1927), animated by Iwerks

In 1922, when Disney began his Laugh-O-Gram cartoon series, Iwerks joined him as chief animator. The studio went bankrupt, however, and in 1923 Iwerks followed Disney's move to Los Angeles to work with Walt and his brother Roy on a new series of cartoons known as the Alice Comedies. The Alice shorts featured a live-action little girl (portrayed by Virginia Davis and later Dawn O'Day (Anne Shirley), Margie Gay, and Lois Hardwick) superimposed into an animated cartoon world. The shorts, produced for Margaret J. Winkler of M.J. Winkler Productions (later Winkler Pictures), proved popular enough to remain in production through 1926.

=== Oswald and Mickey Mouse (1927–1929) ===
After the end of the Alice series, Disney asked Iwerks to design a new character who would star in all-animated - and lower-budgeted - cartoon shorts. Winkler Pictures had been taken over in 1924 by Margaret Winkler's husband, Charles Mintz, who had contracted to produce a cartoon series for release through Universal Pictures. At Disney's request, Iwerks designed the character who became Oswald the Lucky Rabbit. The first Oswald cartoon to be completed was Poor Papa animated entirely by Iwerks and featuring a heavyset and middle-aged version of Oswald. Universal, who would own full rights to the prospective character, rejected Poor Papa and Mintz and Disney had Iwerks design a younger, thinner version of the character. Trolley Troubles, featuring the redesigned Oswald, became the first cartoon in the series to be released, in September 1927.

In February 1928, Walt Disney requested a budget increase for the Oswald cartoons from Charles Mintz, who rejected the request and then informed the stunned Disney that he had secretly hired away most of Disney's animators to make Oswald cartoons in-house instead. These animators included Hugh Harman, Rudolf Ising, and Friz Freleng, all of whom had also followed Iwerks and Disney from Kansas City to Los Angeles. Only Iwerks and a small handful of other holdouts - Les Clark, Wilfred Jackson, Johnny Cannon - had remained loyal to Disney and refused to sign with Mintz. A stunned and angry Walt Disney vowed to never again work with a character he did not own.

Disney asked Iwerks to start drawing up new character ideas - in secret, as the defecting animators would not leave for the new Winkler studio until May 1928. Iwerks tried sketches of frogs, dogs, and cats, but none of these appealed to Disney. Mice characters had turned up periodically in the Alice and Oswald shorts; Harman, one the animators who had just defected to Mintz, had drawn some sketches of mice around a photograph of Walt Disney back in 1925. With additional inspiration from the work of Life magazine cartoonist Clifton Meek, who'd drawn mice characters since the 1910s, Iwerks and Disney worked out a series of sketches that evolved into the character that would be named Mickey Mouse. Iwerks drew the final designs the character, who resembled Oswald with round mouse ears instead of rabbit ears, and animated the first Mickey Mouse cartoon, Plane Crazy, by himself - mostly in secret behind a locked office door until Harman and the other animators left for Winkler.

Excerpt of Steamboat Willie (1928), one of the first few Mickey Mouse shorts, which was animated almost entirely by Iwerks

As with Oswald, Plane Crazy was not the first Mickey short to be released, as neither it nor the follow-up, The Galloping Gaucho, were picked up by a distributor. With the arrival of sound films in the marketplace, Disney and Iwerks designed the third Mickey cartoon, Steamboat Willie, to be synchronized with music and sound effects. Both the needed sound equipment and film distribution were provided by Pat Powers, an veteran film impresario looking for a market for his Powers Cinephone sound-on-film system (actually an unlicensed clone of Lee DeForest's Phonofilm system). Credited as "A Walt Disney Comic by Ub Iwerks," Steamboat Willie was released in November 1928 and made Mickey Mouse an immediate sensation.

Several of the other early Disney sound cartoons were animated almost entirely by Iwerks. These included Plane Crazy, Steamboat Willie, The Haunted House, and the inaugural Silly Symphony short, The Skeleton Dance. As both adapted and original music became more integral to the Disney cartoons, Carl W. Stalling, an acquaintance of Iwerks and Disney from Kansas City, was hired as music director.

=== Break from Disney (1929–1930) ===
Across 1929, Iwerks became increasingly resentful of Disney's leadership and felt his contributions to the success of Mickey Mouse were under-appreciated, despite being the sole animator to receive on-screen credit. On one occasion, a child asked Disney to draw Mickey Mouse on a napkin, and Disney handed the pen to Iwerks, saying, "Why don't you draw Mickey and I'll sign it?" Iwerks retorted, "Draw your own Mickey!" and stormed off. When Charles Giegerich, an associate of Pat Powers, surreptitiously approached Iwerks in September 1929 with an offer to start his own studio, Iwerks eventually accepted. At the time Iwerks signed with Powers in January 1930, Powers was still distributing the Mickey Mouse cartoons, and had arranged distribution of the Silly Symphonies through Columbia Pictures. However, his dealings with the Disney brothers had become increasingly tense and he decided to deal directly with Iwerks instead.

Iwerks waited until January 21, 1930 - after Walt Disney had gone to New York to meet with Powers over financial disputes - to both tender his resignation to Roy Disney instead, and to inform him of his new side deal with Powers. The Iwerks deal and resignation triggered a business crisis that resulted in several months of acrimonious negotiations and business disputes. Upon learning that Iwerks was leaving, music director Carl Stalling resigned as well, later joining Iwerks at his new studio.

The situation was eventually settled by May 1930, with Columbia paying Powers to assume distribution of the Mickey Mouse shorts and Powers negotiating a deal with Metro-Goldwyn-Mayer (MGM) for Iwerks' new studio. Roy Disney bought back Iwerks' 20% interest in Walt Disney Productions as part of his exit from the company. The last Mickey Mouse cartoon Iwerks directed and animated on was Wild Waves (1929), and his final Disney film as a director was the Silly Symphony Autumn (1930). He also penciled the first strips of the Mickey Mouse comic strip.

==== Flip the Frog, Willie Whopper, and ComicColor Cartoons ====
Ub Iwerks' studio, Animated Pictures Corp., opened in 1930. Investors led by Pat Powers eagerly provided support under the impression that Iwerks was responsible for much of Disney's early success. However, while animation for a time suffered at Disney from Iwerks's departure, it soon rebounded as his former co-workers Les Clark, Wilfred Jackson, and New York imports Norm Ferguson and Burt Gillett were joined by new recruits such as Art Babbitt and Fred Moore.

Despite a contract with Metro-Goldwyn-Mayer (MGM) to distribute his cartoons, and the introduction of new characters Flip the Frog and Willie Whopper, the Iwerks Studio was never a major commercial success and failed to rival either Disney or Fleischer Studios. Newly hired animator Fred Kopietz recommended that Iwerks employ a friend from Chouinard Art School, Chuck Jones, who was hired and put to work as a cel washer. Iwerks also lured Fleischer animators such as Grim Natwick, Shamus Culhane, Al Eugster, and Rudy Zamora from New York to Los Angeles to work for his studio.

The Flip the Frog cartoons, which lasted from 1930 to 1933, became Iwerks's most famous work outside of animating Mickey Mouse. Fiddlesticks, the first Flip short, was also the first individual sound cartoon short released in color. (Walter Lantz's animated segment for King of Jazz earlier in 1930 was the first sound color animation to be released.)

Once the Flip series fell out of popularity by 1933, it was replaced by the Willie Whopper cartoons, which failed to catch on. MGM ended its contract with Iwerks in 1934 and instead contracted with Hugh Harman & Rudolf Ising's Harman-Ising Productions to produce a new color series of Happy Harmonies cartoons. The Flip the Frog and Willie Whopper cartoons were later distributed on the home-movie market in 8 mm and 16 mm prints by Official Films in the 1940s.

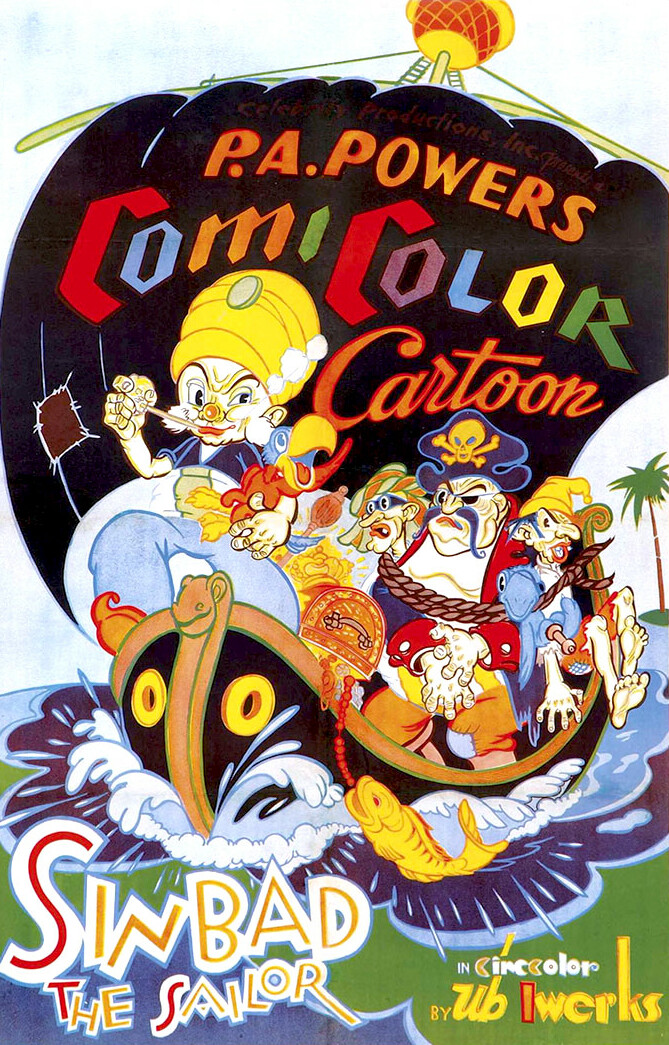
Sinbad the Sailor, a 1935 ComiColor cartoon

From 1933 to 1936, Iwerks produced a series of shorts using the two-strip Cinecolor process under the title ComiColor Cartoons. These shorts were released by Pat Powers through Celebrity Pictures. The ComiColor series mostly focused on fairy tales with no continuing character or star. Iwerks also experimented with stop-motion animation in combination with the multiplane camera, and made a short called The Toy Parade, which was never released in public.

The Flip the Frog and Willie Whopper cartoons were later distributed on the home-movie market in 8 mm and 16 mm prints by Official Films in the 1940s. The ComiColor cartoons received home-movie distribution through Castle Films and later Blackhawk Films.

In 1936, Pat Powers began working out a contract for a new series of cartoons based on the Reg'lar Fellers comic strip about a group of neighborhood kids. Powers wanted Iwerks to either move his studio to New York or allow Powers to set up a satellite studio in New York for the series; when Iwerks declined, Powers and Iwerks parted company and the Celebrity Productions backers withdrew their financial support from Animated Pictures. Only one Reg'lar Fellers cartoon, the ComiColor short Happy Days, was completed and released.

==== Contract work and Gran'Pop Monkey ====
The Iwerks studio continued on by doing advertising films and contract work for other animation studios. In early 1937, Leon Schlesinger Productions contracted Iwerks to produce four Looney Tunes shorts starring Porky Pig and Gabby Goat, reuniting him with Carl W. Stalling and Chuck Jones in the process. Iwerks began the project with his own crew working from Schlesinger staff storyboards, but when production fell behind, Schlesinger assigned Bob Clampett, Chuck Jones, and Robert Cannon to report to the Beverly Hills Animated Pictures offices and help bolster the Iwerks staff.

While Iwerks completed direction on the first two shorts, Porky and Gabby and Porky's Super Service, he quit the project during production of the third, Porky's Badtime Story. He had reportedly grown frustrated with the Porky Pig character, and stopped reporting to work at his studio. Clampett, who resented both the Iwerks assignment and not being able to direct, took over direction of the short himself. Only one more cartoon, Get Rich Quick Porky, was made by Clampett, with assistance from Jones, at Iwerks before he and his co-workers were returned to the main Schlesinger lot and Clampett was given his own unit.

Iwerks reached out to Charles Mintz at the former Winkler studio, which had been acquired by Columbia Pictures and renamed Screen Gems, for more contract work. For Screen Gems, Iwerks produced and directed fifteen shorts between 1936 and 1940 for Columbia'sColor Rhapsody anthology cartoon shorts series with his facilities and staff.

In 1937, Iwerks worked out an arrangement with British producer and financier Lawson Harris to reorganize his animation studio. Now known as Cartoon Films Limited, Iwerks was named vice-president and continued his contract work for Screen Gems while also attempting to launch one final self-produced series, Gran'pop Monkey. Based upon the work of British cartoonist Lawson Wood, three Gran'Pop Monkey cartoons were made in 1938. Intended for release through Educational Pictures, the films were instead released through Monogram Pictures after Educational experienced financial problems of its own.

By 1939, Iwerks had ceded most of the creative supervision and directorial duties to Paul Fennell, and was supplementing his income by teaching animation at an area vocational school. The following year, Iwerks was offered an opportunity to return to Disney and resigned from Cartoon Films on September 9, 1940, and Harris and Fennell continued production at Cartoon Films Ltd. on their own through 1943.

=== Visual effects supervision at Disney (1940–1964) ===
Ben Sharpsteen, who had worked under Iwerks when he first came to the Disney studio in 1929, was by 1940 general manager of the Disney studio. He hired Iwerks back to Disney in August 1940 as an animation checker after hearing of Iwerks' financial struggles. Iwerks reconciled with Walt Disney over lunch, and after learning Iwerks was more interested in working on mechanical processes than working directly on animation, Disney assigned Iwerks to work on the development of a new visual effects optical camera.

In December 1945, Iwerks became the head of the Special Processes and Camera department at Disney. His refined optical camera processes for combining two pieces of Technicolor film (often to combine live-action footage with animation, but also to composite pieces of live-action film as well) were used at Disney on films such Song of the South (1946), So Dear to My Heart (1949), and The Parent Trap (1961). Iwerks and his team at Disney would continue to refine these processes for decades, and Iwerks was given a 1960 Academy Award for Technical Achievement for his improved optical printer and matte process.

Iwerks and his team also spent years adapting the xerographic process for cel animation, in order to directly photocopy animators' pencil drawings to animation cels, speeding up the animation process by minimizing the need to trace each drawing from paper to celluloid by hand via the "inking" stage. First used in primitive form for Fantasia (1940), Iwerks developed a variety of patents for applying xerography for use in animation. The matured animation xerography process was first used in the climax of Sleeping Beauty (1959) before being used for most of the animation for One Hundred and One Dalmatians (1961). Xerography quickly became a standard procedure for the animation industry due to its cost-savings. He also did work for WED Enterprises, now Walt Disney Imagineering, helping to develop many Disney theme park attractions during the 1960s.

Iwerks's last major work for a Disney film was the further improvements of his visual effects processes for Mary Poppins. This included the purchase and re-development of the sodium vapor screen filming process (informally referred to as "yellowscreen," despite being a different process from chroma key) to achieve improved visual effects compositing quality in scenes from Dick Van Dyke's "Jolly Holiday" dance with cartoon penguins to the "Feed the Birds" sequence.

While developing the sodium screen process for Poppins, Iwerks was tapped by Alfred Hitchcock to supervise the special effects for his 1963 film The Birds. Many of the visual effects shots for The Birds were devised and filmed by Iwerks at the Disney studio, and Iwerks was nominated for the 1964 Academy Award for Best Visual Effects. For his work on Mary Poppins, Iwerks and his team were awarded a second Academy Award for Technical Achievement in 1965.

== Personal life and death ==
Iwerks married Mildred Henderson about 1926. They had two sons, Donald and David. The former went on to work for the Walt Disney company and to found Iwerks Entertainment, while the latter became a portrait photographer. His granddaughter is documentary film producer Leslie Iwerks.

Iwerks died on July 7, 1971 from a heart attack in Burbank, California, aged 70, and his ashes are interred in a niche in the Columbarium of Remembrance at Forest Lawn Memorial Park, Hollywood Hills Cemetery. The last project he worked on was the Hall of Presidents.

== Influence and tributes ==
The Ub Iwerks Award for Technical Achievement at the Annie Awards, the annual awards ceremony for the American animation industry, is named in his honor.

A rare self-portrait of Iwerks was found in a garbage bin at an animation studio in Burbank. The portrait was saved and is now part of the Animation Archives in Burbank, California.

After World War II, much of Iwerks's early animation style was imitated by legendary manga artists Osamu Tezuka and Shotaro Ishinomori.

In 1989, Iwerks was named a Disney Legend in both the Animation and Imagineering categories.

In the 1996 The Simpsons episode "The Day the Violence Died", a relationship similar to Iwerks's early relationship with Walt Disney is used as the main plot.

A documentary film, The Hand Behind the Mouse: The Ub Iwerks Story, was released in 1999, followed by a book written by Iwerks's granddaughter Leslie Iwerks and John Kenworthy in 2001. The documentary, created by Leslie Iwerks, was released as part of The Walt Disney Treasures, Wave VII series (disc two of The Adventures of Oswald the Lucky Rabbit collection).

A feature film released in 2014, Walt Before Mickey, showed how Ub Iwerks, portrayed by Armando Gutierrez, and Walt Disney, portrayed by Thomas Ian Nicholas, co-created Mickey Mouse.

The sixth episode from the second season of Drunk History ("Hollywood") tells about Ub's work relationship with Disney, with stress on the creation of Mickey Mouse. Iwerks was portrayed in the episode by Tony Hale.

== Filmography ==
=== 1922 ===
Title	Release date	Notes
Little Red Riding Hood	July 29	
The Four Musicians of Bremen	August 1	
Jack and the Beanstalk	September 4	
Jack the Giant Killer	September 12	
Goldie Locks and the Three Bears	October 4	
Puss in Boots	November 3	
Cinderella	December 6	

=== 1923 ===
Title	Release date	Notes
Alice's Wonderland	October 16	

=== 1924 ===
Title	Release date	Notes
Alice's Day at Sea	March 1	
Alice's Spooky Adventure	April 1	
Alice's Wild West Show	May 1	
Alice's Fishy Story	June 1	
Alice and the Dog Catcher	July 1	
Alice the Peacemaker	August 1	
Alice Gets in Dutch	November 1	
Alice Hunting in Africa	November 15	
Alice and the Three Bears	December 1	
Alice the Piper	December 15	

=== 1925 ===
Title	Release date	Notes
Alice Cans the Cannibals	January 1	
Alice the Toreador	January 15	
Alice Gets Stung	February 1	
Alice Solves the Puzzle	February 15	
Alice's Egg Plant	May 17	
Alice Loses Out	June 15	
Alice Is Stage Struck	June 23	
Alice Wins the Derby	July 12	
Alice Picks the Champ	July 30	
Alice's Tin Pony	August 15	
Alice Chops the Suey	August 30	
Alice the Jail Bird	September 15	
Alice Plays Cupid	October 15	
Alice Rattled by Rats	November 15	
Alice in the Jungle	December 15	

=== 1926 ===
Title	Release date	Notes
Alice on the Farm	January 1	
Alice's Balloon Race	January 15	
Alice's Orphan	January 15	
Alice's Little Parade	February 1	
Alice's Mysterious Mystery	February 15	
Alice Charms the Fish	September 6	
Alice's Monkey Business	September 20	
Alice in Slumberland	September 29	
Alice in the Wooly West	October 4	
Alice the Fire Fighter	October 18	
Alice Cuts the Ice	November 1	
Alice Helps the Romance	November 15	
Alice's Spanish Guitar	November 29	
Alice's Brown Derby	December 13	
Alice the Lumberjack	December 27	

=== 1927 ===
Title	Release date	Notes
Alice the Golf Bug	January 10	
Alice Foils the Pirates	January 24	
Alice at the Carnival	February 7	
Alice at the Rodeo	February 21	
Alice the Collegiate	March 7	
Alice in the Alps	March 21	
Alice's Auto Race	April 4	
Alice's Circus Daze	April 18	
Alice's Knaughty Knights	May 2	
Alice's Three Bad Eggs	May 15	
Poor Papa	May 15	The first Oswald The Rabbit short produced by Walt Disney and distributed by Universal Studios.
Alice's Picnic	May 30	
Alice's Channel Swim	June 13	
Alice in the Klondike	June 27	
Alice's Medicine Show	July 11	
Alice the Whaler	July 25	
Alice the Beach Nut	August 8	
Trolley Troubles	September 5	
Oh Teacher	September 19	
The Mechanical Cow	October 3	
Great Guns!	October 17	
All Wet	October 31	
The Ocean Hop	November 14	
The Banker's Daughter	November 28	
Rickety Gin	December 26	

=== 1928 ===
Title	Release date	Notes
The Ol' Swimming Hole	February 6	
Africa Before Dark	February 20	
Rival Romeos	March 5	
Bright Lights	March 19	
Sagebrush Sadie	April 2	
Ride 'Em Plowboy	April 16	
Ozzy of the Mounted	April 30	
Hungry Hobos	May 14	
Plane Crazy	May 15	First Mickey Mouse cartoon ever produced.
Oh What a Knight	May 28	
The Fox Chase	June 25	
Tall Timber	July 9	
Sleigh Bells	July 23	
High Up	August 6	
The Gallopin' Gaucho	August 7	Second Mickey Mouse cartoon ever produced.
Hot Dogs	August 20	
Sky Scrapper	September 23	
Steamboat Willie	November 18	Music composed by Wilfred Jackson and Burt Lewis.

=== 1929 ===
Title	Release date	Notes
The Barn Dance	March 14	
The Opry House	March 28	
When the Cat's Away	April 11	
The Barnyard Battle	April 25	
The Karnival Kid	May 23	
Mickey's Choo-Choo	June 20	
Mickey's Follies	June 26	
The Plowboy	June 28	
The Jazz Fool	July 5	
Wild Waves	August 15	
The Skeleton Dance	August 29	The first "Silly Symphony"
El Terrible Toreador	September 26	
Springtime	October 24	
Jungle Rhythm	November 15	
Hell's Bells	November 21	
The Haunted House	December 2	
The Merry Dwarfs	December 19	

=== 1930 ===
Title	Release date	Series	Notes
Fiddlesticks	August 16	Flip the Frog	First Flip the Frog cartoon; Filmed in two-strip Harriscolor, but widely released in B/W
Little Orphan Willie	October 18	Flip the Frog	Filmed in two-strip Harriscolor, but only intact in B/W
Flying Fists	September 6	Flip the Frog	Filmed in two-strip Harriscolor, but only intact in B/W
The Village Barber	September 27	Flip the Frog	First non-woodland cartoon
The Cuckoo Murder Case	October 18	Flip the Frog	First Halloween-themed cartoon
Puddle Pranks	December	Flip the Frog	Final woodland-themed cartoon; This and Little Orphan Willie were never copyrighted; Only appearance of Flip's frog girlfriend

=== 1931 ===
Title	Release date	Series	Notes
The Village Smitty	January 31	Flip the Frog	First appearance of Flip's cat girlfriend and Orace
The Soup Song	January 31	Flip the Frog	Bandmaster Paul Whiteman is caricatured
Laughing Gas	March 14	Flip the Frog	Only appearance of the walrus
Ragtime Romeo	May 2	Flip the Frog	First time Flip wears a hat
The New Car	July 25	Flip the Frog	Starting with this cartoon, Flip's design slowly changes; Some plot elements in this cartoon are reused from a Disney Oswald cartoon, Trolley Troubles
Movie Mad	August 29	Flip the Frog	Caricatures include Laurel and Hardy and Charlie Chaplin
The Village Specialist	September 12	Flip the Frog	Only appearance of Mrs Pig
Jail Birds	September 26	Flip the Frog	First time Orace is Flip's horse
Africa Squeaks	October 17	Flip the Frog	No longer shown on American television due to offensive black stereotypes
Spooks	September 21	Flip the Frog	Second Halloween-themed cartoon

=== 1932 ===
Title	Release date	Series	Notes
The Milkman	February 20	Flip the Frog	First appearance of the orphan boy
Fire! Fire!	March 5	Flip the Frog	
What a Life	March 26	Flip the Frog	First time Flip interacts with humans
Puppy Love	April 30	Flip the Frog	First appearance of Flip's dog
School Days	May 14	Flip the Frog	First appearance of the spinster
The Bully	June 18	Flip the Frog	Final appearance of the orphan boy
The Office Boy	July 16	Flip the Frog	The secretary is a caricature of Joan Crawford; Contains inappropriate content
Room Runners	August 13	Flip the Frog	Contains inappropriate content
Stormy Seas	August 22	Flip the Frog	Possibly a withheld 1931 release; Final appearance of Flip's cat girlfriend
Circus	August 27	Flip the Frog	Copyrighted on September 7, 1932
The Goal Rush	October 3	Flip the Frog	In the beginning, there is a scene considered inappropriate where the bandmaster shoots the clarinet player just for playing wrong; First appearance of Flip's human girlfriend
The Phoney Express	October 27	Flip the Frog	First "official" appearance of Flip's human girlfriend. She bears a strong resemblance to Fleischer Studios's Betty Boop. The original title for the cartoon was "The Pony Express", but later changed to "The Phoney Express" by Pat Powers
The Music Lesson	October 29	Flip the Frog	Only appearance of Flip's friends
The Nurse Maid	November 26	Flip the Frog	This cartoon has two racist scenes that do not appear on TV. There is an angry "Chinaman–Fu Man Chu" type with long fingernails trying to scratch the eyes out of Flip. Later, a cigar store Indian has gags with runaway animals.
Funny Face	December 24	Flip the Frog	In the public domain

=== 1933 ===
Title	Release date	Series	Notes
Coo Coo, the Magician	January 21	Flip the Frog	Cameo of the spinster at the beginning
Flip's Lunchroom	March 4	Flip the Frog	Only Flip the Frog cartoon to have Flip's name in the title
Techno-Cracked	May 8	Flip the Frog	Possibly filmed in two-strip Technicolor or cinecolor
Bulloney	May 30	Flip the Frog	
A Chinaman's Chance	June 24	Flip the Frog	No longer shown on American television due to offensive Chinese stereotypes; Final appearance of Flip's dog
Paleface	August 12	Flip the Frog	Final appearances of Orace, Flip's girlfriend, and the spinster
The Air Race	n/a	Willie Whopper	The first Willie Whopper cartoon, though it was never released due to a plot hole. A remake, Spite Flight, was released.
Play Ball	September 16	Willie Whopper	The first official Willie Whopper cartoon
Soda Squirt	October 12	Flip the Frog	Final Flip the Frog cartoon; Caricatures include Laurel and Hardy, Jimmy Durante, Buster Keaton, Rasputin, the Marx Brothers, Mae West, and Joe E. Brown.
Spite Flight	October 14	Willie Whopper	A remake of the unreleased Willie Whopper cartoon, The Air Race
Stratos Fear	November 11	Willie Whopper	
Jack and the Beanstalk	December 23	Comicolor	First Comicolor cartoon

=== 1934 ===
Title	Release date	Series	Notes
Davy Jones Locker	January 13	Willie Whopper	The first of two Willie Whopper cartoons to be filmed in Cinecolor
The Little Red Hen	February 16	Comicolor	
Hell's Fire	February 17	Willie Whopper	The only cartoon made by Ub Iwerks to have a curse word in the title. This is the last of the two Willie Whopper cartoons filmed in Cinecolor.
Robin Hood, Jr.	March 10	Willie Whopper	
The Brave Tin Soldier	April 7	Comicolor	
Insultin' the Sultan	April 14	Willie Whopper	
Puss in Boots	May 17	Comicolor	Two other prints exist.
Reducing Creme	May 19	Willie Whopper	
Rasslin' Round	June 1	Willie Whopper	Working title: Rasslin' Around
The Queen of Hearts	June 25	Comicolor	
Cave Man	July 6	Willie Whopper	Music composed by Bennie Moten and his orchestra
Jungle Jitters	July 24	Willie Whopper	No longer shown on American television due to offensive black stereotypes
Aladdin and the Wonderful Lamp	August 10	ComiColor	
Good Scout	September 1	Willie Whopper	Music composed by McKinney's Cotton Pickers; Stereotypes of ethnic (Chinese, Jewish, Black) boy scouts
Viva Willie	September 20	Willie Whopper	Final Willie Whopper cartoon. After this cartoon, the rest are Comicolor cartoons.
The Headless Horseman	October 1	Comicolor	
The Valiant Tailor	October 29	Comicolor	
Don Quixote	November 26	Comicolor	Preserved by the Academy Film Archive in 1998
Jack Frost	December 24	Comicolor	

=== 1935 ===
All Comicolor shorts

Title	Release date	Notes
Little Black Sambo	February 6	No longer shown on American television due to offensive black stereotypes
Brementown Musicians	March 6	
Old Mother Hubbard	April 3	
Mary's Little Lamb	May 1	
Summertime	June 15	
Sinbad the Sailor	July 30	
The Three Bears	August 30	
Balloonland (aka The Pincushion Man)	September 30	This is known as both Balloonland and The Pincushion Man
Simple Simon	November 15	
Humpty Dumpty	December 30	

=== 1936 ===
All Comicolor shorts

Title	Release date	Notes
Ali Baba	January 30	
Tom Thumb	March 30	
Dick Whittington's Cat	May 30	
Little Boy Blue (aka The Big Bad Wolf)	July 30	This cartoon is variously known both as Little Boy Blue and The Big Bad Wolf.
Happy Days	September 30	Last of the Comicolor cartoons, based on the comic strip Reg'lar Fellers. The last cartoon made prior to reorganizing the studio.

=== 1936-1940 ===
- Contract work to Screen Gems/Columbia Pictures – 16 cartoons (Iwerks was only personally involved with 15 of the Color Rhapsody series, the last cartoon in the deal was completed by Paul Fennell after Iwerks had left his own studio)
- Contract work to Leon Schlesinger Productions – two cartoons
- In 1938, Iwerks produced his last series, Gran' Pop Monkey, featuring the title character created by British illustrator Lawson Wood. There were three cartoons produced: "A Busy Day", "Beauty Shoppe" and "Baby Checkers". All three were released theatrically by Monogram Pictures between 1940 and 1941.

Title	Release date	Notes
Two Lazy Crows	November 26, 1936	A Color Rhapsody cartoon; First Color Rhapsody directed by Iwerks
Skeleton Frolic	January 29, 1937	A Color Rhapsody cartoon; remake of Iwerk's earlier The Skeleton Dance
Merry Mannequins	March 19, 1937	A Color Rhapsody cartoon
Porky and Gabby	May 15, 1937	A Looney Tunes cartoon; First Looney Tune by Iwerks and debut of Gabby Goat
The Foxy Pup	May 21, 1937	A Color Rhapsody cartoon
Porky's Super Service	July 3, 1937	A Looney Tunes cartoon; Last Looney Tune by Iwerks
The Horse on the Merry-Go-Round	February 17, 1938	A Color Rhapsody cartoon
Snow Time	April 14, 1938	A Color Rhapsody cartoon
The Frog Pond	August 12, 1938	A Color Rhapsody cartoon
Midnight Frolics	November 24, 1938	A Color Rhapsody cartoon
The Gorilla Hunt	February 24, 1939	A Color Rhapsody cartoon
Nell’s Yells	June 30, 1939	A Color Rhapsody cartoon
Crop Chasers	September 22, 1939	A Color Rhapsody cartoon
Blackboard Revue	March 15, 1940	A Color Rhapsody cartoon
The Egg Hunt	May 31, 1940	A Color Rhapsody cartoon
Ye Olde Swap Shoppe	June 28, 1940	A Color Rhapsody cartoon
A Busy Day	July 22, 1940	A Gran’ Pop Monkey cartoon
Wise Owl	December 5, 1940	A Color Rhpsody; Last Color Rhapsody directed by Iwerks, Last cartoon Iwerks directed before returning to Disney
Beauty Shoppe	January 19, 1941	A Gran’ Pop Monkey cartoon
Baby Checkers	February 2, 1941	A Gran’ Pop Monkey cartoon
The Carpenters	March 14, 1941	A Color Rhapsody; Directed by Paul Fennell, Iwerks was not involved in the creation of this cartoon (as he had returned to Disney) but it was made as part of his contract with Screen Gems

== Accolades ==
Year	Award	Category	Recognition	Shared with	Result
1960	Academy Awards	Technical Achievement Award	For the design of an improved optical printer for special effects and matte shots.	—N/a	Won
1964	Academy Awards	Best Effects, Special Visual Effects	The Birds	—N/a	Nominated
1964	Academy Awards	Academy Award of Merit	For the conception and perfection of techniques for Color Traveling Matte Composite Cinematography.	Petro Vlahos and Wadsworth E. Pohl	Won
1978	Annie Awards	Winsor McCay Award	—N/a	—N/a	Won
1989	Disney Legend	Honoree	Animation and Imagineering Categories	—N/a	Won
2017	Visual Effects Society Awards	Hall of Fame	—N/a	—N/a	Won

== See also ==
- Walt Disney (film)
