= The Mechanical Cow =

1927 film by Walt Disney

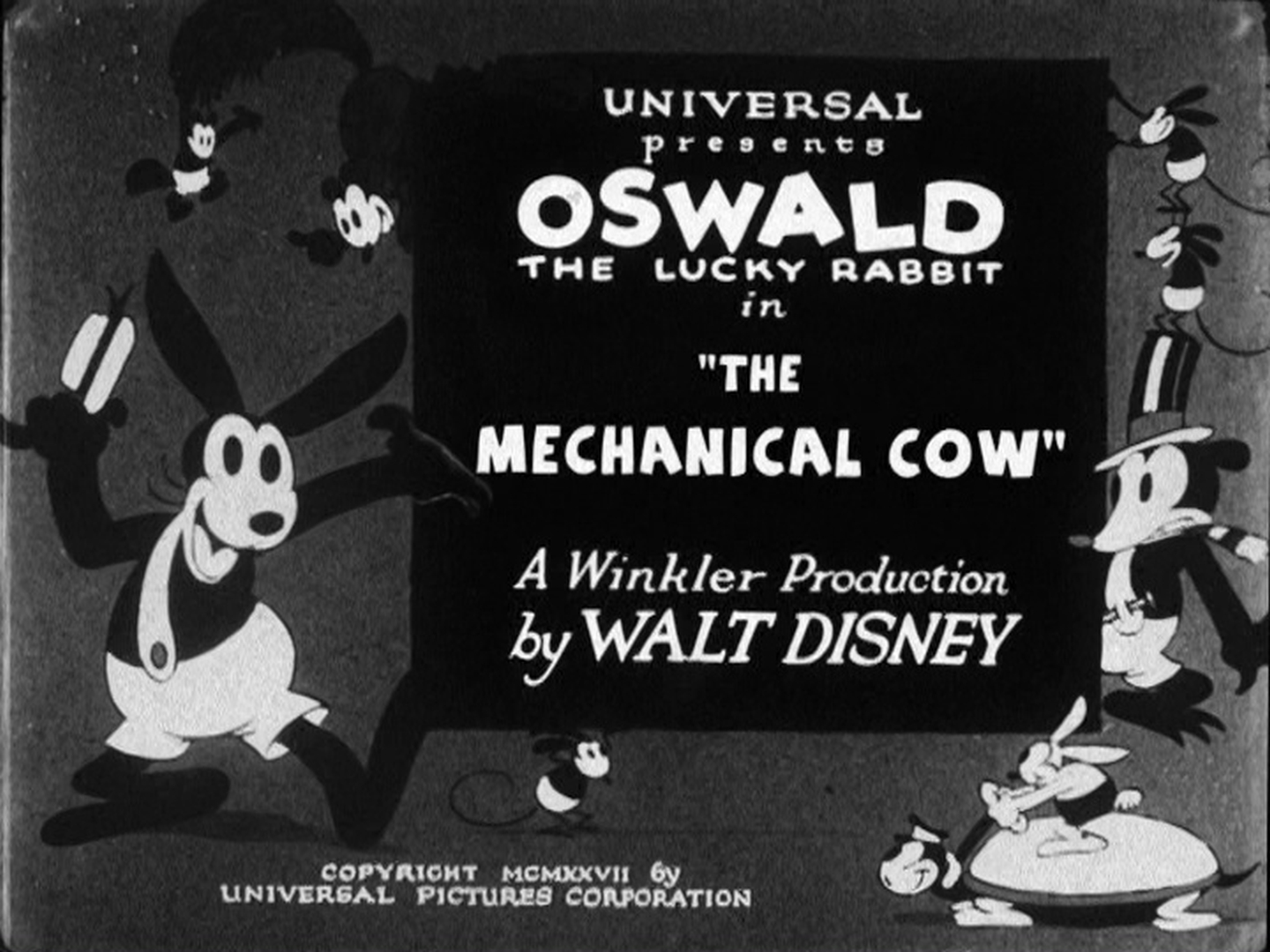
- Title card
- Directed by: Walt Disney
- Produced by: Charles Mintz; George Winkler
- Animation by: Ub Iwerks
- Color process: Black-and-white
- Production company: Winkler Productions
- Distributed by: Universal Pictures
- Release date: October 3, 1927
- Running time: 6:03
- Country: United States
- Language: English

The Mechanical Cow is a 1927 American animated comedy short film directed by Walt Disney. It was produced by Winkler Productions and distributed by Universal Pictures. The cartoon was re-released by Walter Lantz Productions in 1932 with music and sound effects added.

== Plot ==
The short film.

Oswald and his mechanical cow are sleeping in adjacent beds. The alarm clock wakes up Oswald, who has a brief fight with the clock. He attempts to get the cow out of bed but the cow refuses to get up. Finally Oswald coaxes the cow onto a slide which propels him down to a lower floor onto four roller skates. Oswald rides on the cow outside while announcing that he has milk to sell. A mother hippopotamus buys some for her infant hippo, which Oswald dispenses from the cow's udder directly into the baby's mouth. Fanny, Oswald's girlfriend, comes to buy some milk and Oswald flirts with her.

Suddenly, a car driven by bears resembling Pete abducts Fanny. Oswald follows, riding on the mechanical cow. The figures shoot at Oswald but he evades their bullets. Oswald causes the cow's neck to elongate in a scissors mechanism, reaching the car. He runs along the neck and extracts Fanny from the car. They ride away on the cow, with the car now pursuing them. Oswald and Fanny fall off a cliff but Oswald grabs a branch to stop their fall. The pursuing car also falls over the cliff, with the bears falling out of the car into a body of water where they are eaten by fish. Oswald and Fanny ride off on the mechanical cow.

== Home media ==
After The Walt Disney Company purchased the rights to the film from Universal Pictures, the film was released on December 11, 2007, on Walt Disney Treasures: The Adventures of Oswald the Lucky Rabbit.
