= Oh What a Knight =

1928 film by Walt Disney and Ub Iwerks

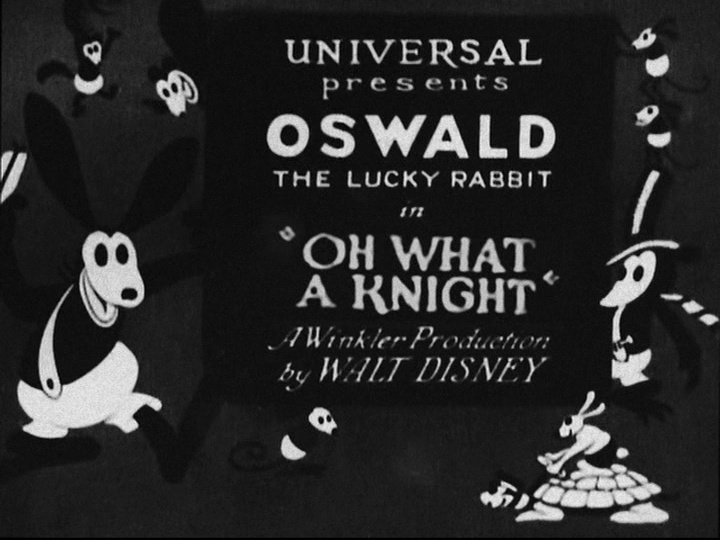
- Title card
- Directed by: Walt Disney; Ub Iwerks
- Story by: Ub Iwerks; Walt Disney
- Produced by: Charles Mintz; George Winker
- Animation by: Ub Iwerks; Hugh Harman; Rollin Hamilton
- Color process: Black-and-white
- Production company: Winkler Pictures
- Distributed by: Universal Pictures
- Release date: May 28, 1928
- Running time: 6 minutes (one reel)
- Country: United States
- Language: silent film

Oh What a Knight is an American animated short film directed by Walt Disney and Ub Iwerks and released in 1928 by Universal Pictures. The short film features Oswald the Lucky Rabbit attempting to rescue his girlfriend Ortensia from her overprotective father, Pete, employing unusual fighting tactics—including manipulating his own shadow. Oswald's bold and adventurous demeanor in the cartoon reflects a personality inspired by silent film star Douglas Fairbanks.

== Plot ==
Full short

In the Middle Ages, Oswald, a minstrel, rides his horse while singing and playing a concertina. He reaches a stone tower in which Pete is keeping his daughter Ortensia captive. He scales the tower and he kisses Ortensia. Pete appears carrying a spear. Oswald grabs a sword and they fight. Pete breaks through a wall and gets stuck, allowing Oswald to free Ortensia from the large iron ball to which she is chained. Pete gets free and calls nine knights to help him. Oswald rolls the iron ball toward them like a bowling ball and scatters them. Escaping by the door, they discover a hostile lion, so they leap from the tower using her dress as a parachute and kiss each other as they fall off.

== Release ==
Oh What a Knight was released on December 11, 2007, as part of Walt Disney Treasures: The Adventures of Oswald the Lucky Rabbit. The short was later included as a viewable feature within the 2010 Wii platformer Epic Mickey. It also appeared in the remake Epic Mickey Rebrushed (2024).

== Legacy ==
Epic Mickey features levels inspired by classic Disney cartoons, including Oh What a Knight. The short also appears as one of the unlockable cartoons in the game.
