= Oh Teacher (film) =

1927 film by Walt Disney

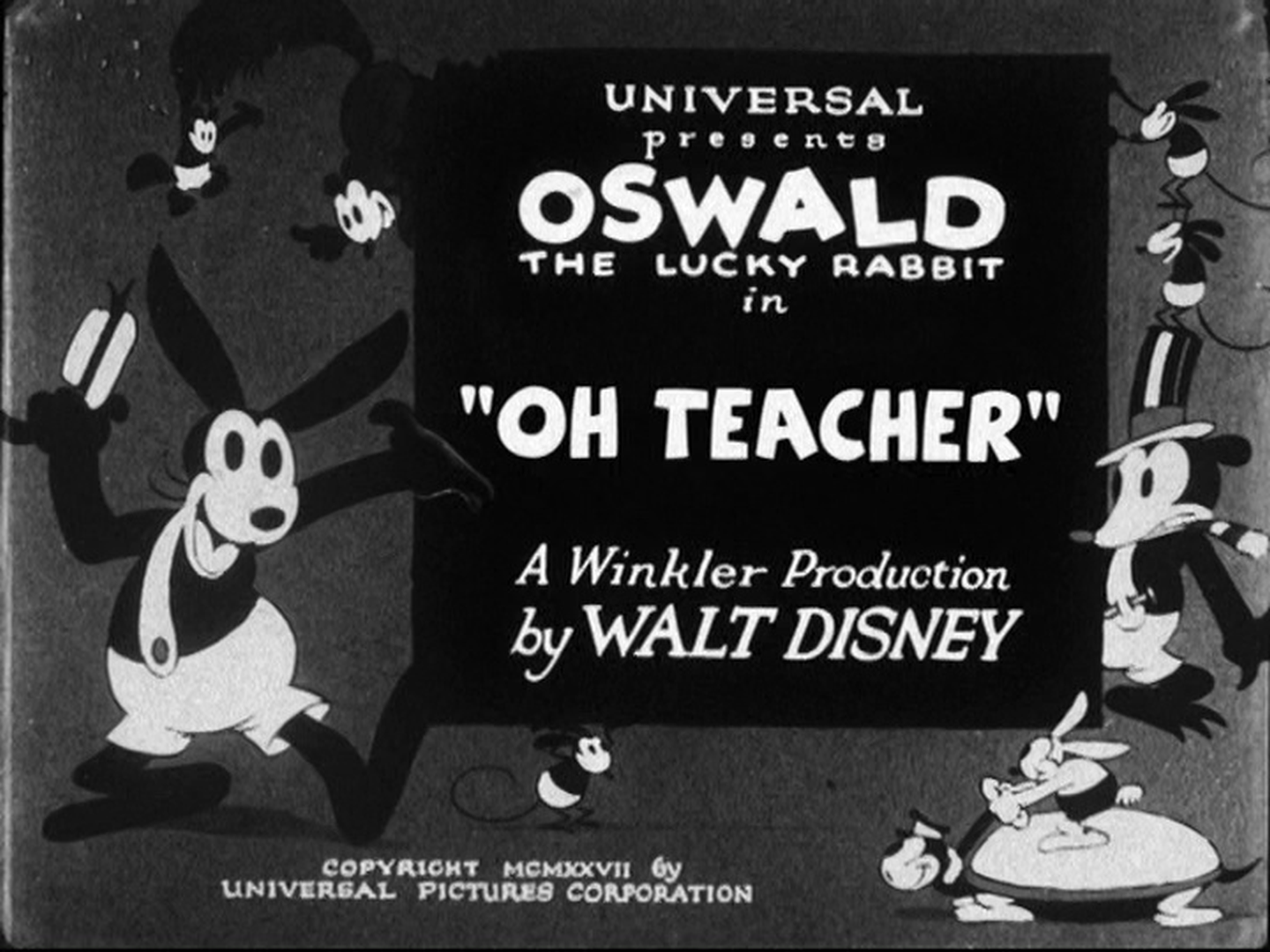
- Title card
- Directed by: Walt Disney
- Produced by: Charles Mintz; George Winkler
- Animation by: Hugh Harman; Friz Freleng; Rollin Hamilton
- Color process: Black-and-white
- Production company: Winkler Pictures
- Distributed by: Universal Pictures
- Release date: September 19, 1927
- Running time: 5:53
- Country: United States
- Language: English

Oh Teacher is a 1927 American animated comedy short film directed by Walt Disney, starring Oswald the Lucky Rabbit, and distributed by Universal Pictures. The film was reissued in 1932 by Universal Pictures with added music and sound effects. The original version entered the public domain on January 1, 2023.

== Plot ==
Oswald rides to his girlfriend's house on a bicycle, picking a flower for her. His girlfriend agrees to go out with him. A school bus picks up a pig to school, after which a mischievous cat harasses a younger cat on the bus by pulling its tail. The school bus driver sabotages the cat with a puff of exhaust fumes, sending him crashing. Angered, he finds another opportunity of mischief by literally using a question mark as a rope to throw Oswald off his bicycle.

The short film.

The cat wastes no time in stealing Oswald's bike. As Oswald chases, the cat loses control and crashes into a pole, turning the bike into a tall unicycle as Oswald's girlfriend falls into a river. As she calls for help, Oswald literally uses her call for help to speedily arrive and rescue her. Unfortunately, she is smitten after the cat uses Oswald as a bridge and saves her. The cat defeats Oswald in a fight, abducts his girlfriend and brings him to school right as it starts. The classroom scene was cut in the reissued version and remains lost.

During recess, Oswald arrives at the school for revenge with a brick, intending to assault the cat while he walks out. Unbeknownst to him, the cat is right behind him. As he confronts the cat, he taunts the cat and convinces him that he will give up the brick as an apology, as long as he throws it and catches it. The brick lands on the school's roof, falling into a vent and eventually knocking the cat out. Oswald, not realizing what happened, taunts the unconscious cat until his girlfriend arrives, convinced that Oswald actually defeated the cat. Realizing his good luck, Oswald gloats to his girlfriend about his feat.

== Home media ==
After The Walt Disney Company acquired the right to the film and the character from Universal Studios in 2006, the film was released by Walt Disney Studios Home Entertainment on December 11, 2007, on Walt Disney Treasures: The Adventures of Oswald the Lucky Rabbit.
