= Marvin Levy (publicist) =

American publicist (1928–2025)

- Levy in the 1950s
- Born: November 16, 1928; New York City, U.S.
- Died: April 7, 2025 (aged 96); Los Angeles, California, U.S.
- Education: New York University
- Occupation: Film publicist
- Known for: Work with Steven Spielberg
- Spouse: Carol Schild (m. 1952)
- Children: 2

Marvin Jay Levy (November 16, 1928 – April 7, 2025) was an American publicist who specialized in film marketing and public relations. He is most noted for having been a longtime marketer for director Steven Spielberg at Amblin Entertainment and DreamWorks, where he led publicity and awards campaigns for films.

== Early life ==
Marvin Jay Levy was born in Manhattan, New York, on November 16, 1928, where he grew up on the East Side. He graduated from New York University in 1949. Entering the advertising sector, he got a job at a radio station, for which he collected questions and answers for a quiz show, but was fired because his questions were not difficult enough. Shortly thereafter, he became the publicist for the first Tex McCrary and Jinx Falkenburg talk shows; he was eventually laid off, but a letter of recommendation from McCrary secured his next job in the advertising division of the New York Metro-Goldwyn-Mayer office. He was in the United States Air Force from 1952 to 1954, where he served in Michigan and worked in public relations.

== Career ==
Levy's career began in communications during his service in the United States Air Force, where he worked in advertising and public relations. At MGM's New York office, he was entrusted with the task of promoting films in New York and conducting promotional campaigns with local stars, including for films awarded with the Best Picture Oscar like Gigi and Ben-Hur.

In 1962, Levy joined New York-based movie public relations company Blowitz, Thomas and Canton. From there, he became an advertising and publicity executive with Cinerama Releasing Corp., prompting his move to Los Angeles in 1974. After Cinerama's merger with American International Pictures, Levy moved to Columbia Pictures in the first months of 1975. With the commercialization of great films such as Taxi Driver, The Deep, and Kramer vs. Kramer, Levy climbed the hierarchy of the film marketing department of Columbia Pictures. One of the productions he marketed at the time was Close Encounters of the Third Kind, Steven Spielberg's first film following the success of Jaws.

=== Work with Steven Spielberg ===
Spielberg and Levy got along so well that Spielberg increasingly relied on Levy's advice in the following years and Levy became a father figure for him. In 1982, Spielberg was at the zenith in Hollywood and Levy moved to Spielberg's production company Amblin Entertainment to represent it exclusively. He directed marketing and public relations at Amblin for twelve years. When Spielberg founded DreamWorks Pictures in 1994 with Jeffrey Katzenberg and David Geffen, Levy moved there with him. He worked both as a publicist for the films, and for Spielberg himself.

In 1994, Levy received the Les Mason award, the highest award from the Local 600 International Cinematographers Guild (Film Marketer Association).

He was member of the Board of Governors of the Academy of Motion Picture Arts and Sciences at the Public Relations Branch from 1991 to 2002 and again beginning in 2004.

In 2018, at the age of 90, he became the first publicist who received an Honorary Academy Award for an exemplary career in publicity that has brought films to the minds, hearts and souls of audiences all over the world.

Levy retired in 2024.

== Personal life and death ==
In 1952, Levy married fellow advertising professional Carol Schild. They had two sons. He died at his home in Studio City, Los Angeles, on April 7, 2025, at the age of 96.

== Partial filmography ==
- Gigi (1958)
- Ben-Hur (1959)
- Taxi Driver (1976)
- Close Encounters of the Third Kind (1977)
- The Deep (1977)
- Kramer vs. Kramer (1979)
- Back to the Future (1985)
- Back to the Future Part II (1989)
- Back to the Future Part III (1990)
- Jurassic Park (1993)
- Schindler's List (1993)
- The Lost World: Jurassic Park (1996)
- Saving Private Ryan (1998)
- American Beauty (1999)
- Gladiator (2000)
- A Beautiful Mind (2001)
- Munich (2005)
- War Horse (2011)
- Lincoln (2012)
- Bridge of Spies (2015)
- The Post (2017)
