= Hungry Hobos =

1928 film by Walt Disney

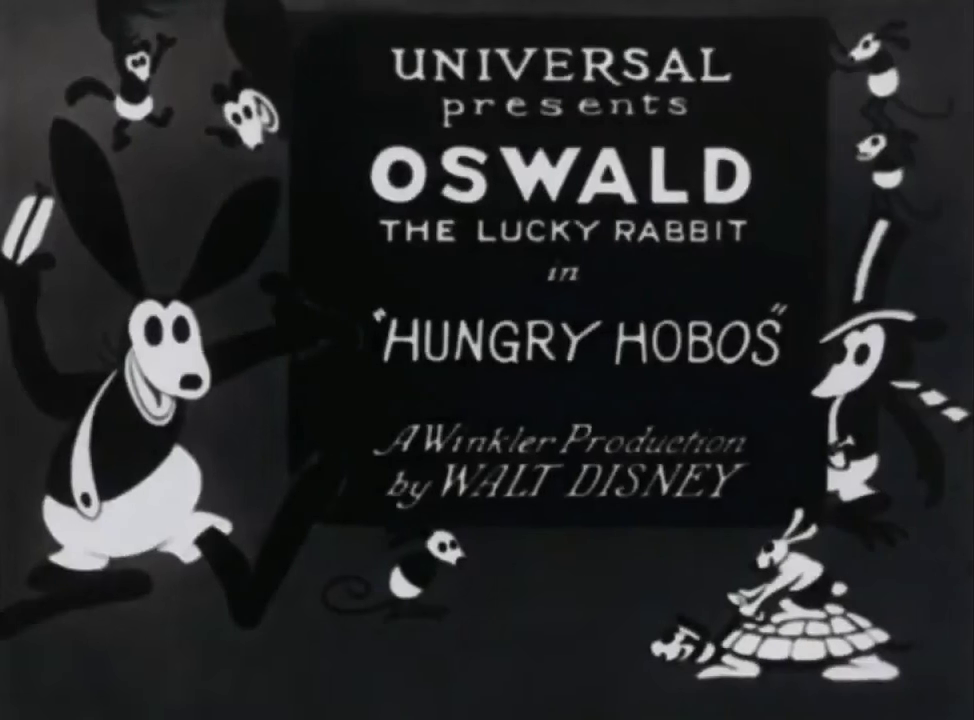
- Title card
- Directed by: Walt Disney
- Written by: Walt Disney
- Produced by: Charles Mintz; George Winkler
- Animation by: Ub Iwerks
- Production company: Winkler Pictures
- Distributed by: Universal Pictures
- Release date: May 14, 1928
- Running time: 5:21
- Country: United States
- Language: Silent with English intertitles

Hungry Hobos is a 1928 American silent comedy film directed by Walt Disney. It features Oswald the Lucky Rabbit and was released on May 14, 1928. It was rediscovered in November 2011.

== Plot summary ==
Hungry Hoboes (1928)

Oswald the Lucky Rabbit and Peg Leg Pete are hobos riding on a train carrying cows and chickens. As they play checkers, they are annoyed by Clarabelle (as Bessie) and the cows around them. A chicken appears and they imagine having fried eggs. As Pete prepares a skillet, Oswald unsuccessfully tries to coerce the chicken into laying eggs. Finally he pulls the chicken's head off and extracts two eggs from its body. Since neither hobo has a match, Pete drags Oswald's rear end along the rail until his pants catch fire, then cooks the eggs by holding the skillet over Oswald's burning pants. A policeman notices the two and they run from him, as he pursues them on a bicycle. Pete disguises Oswald as a monkey and, putting a dog, a cat and a pig into a box with a crank on one side, he pretends to be an organ grinder. The deception fails when the animals escape from the box, and the hobos run from the policeman again. They finally escape by jumping onto another train.

== Releases ==
The short was released by Universal Studios in 1928.

It was rediscovered in November 2011 in the Huntley Film Archives. It was later purchased by the Walt Disney Company for $31,250. It was then restored in an almost year-long digital process. Hungry Hoboes re-debuted at the Telluride Film Festival, on September 2, 2012, as part of a special animation shorts program presented by leading film historian and restoration expert Serge Bromberg.
