= The Fox Chase =

1928 film by Walt Disney

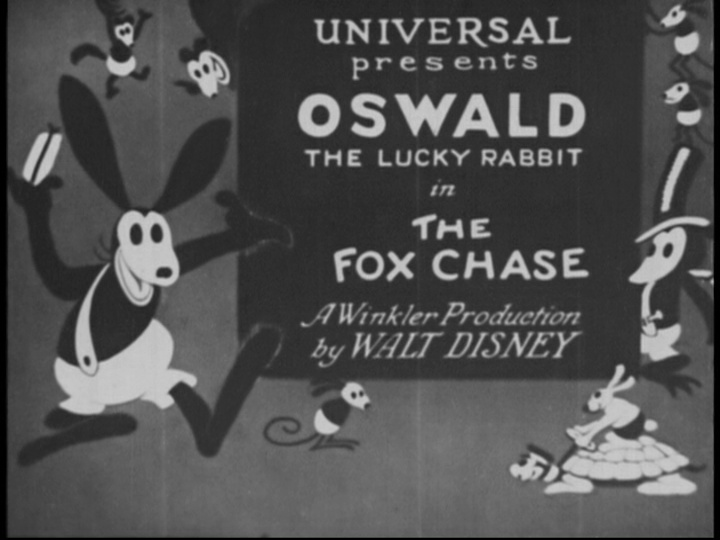
- Title card
- Directed by: Walt Disney
- Story by: Walt Disney
- Produced by: Charles Mintz; George Winkler
- Animation by: Ub Iwerks; Hugh Harman; Les Clark; Friz Freleng; Ben Clopton; Norm Blackburn; Rollin Hamilton
- Production company: Winkler Pictures
- Distributed by: Universal Pictures
- Release date: June 25, 1928
- Running time: 5:16
- Country: United States
- Language: Silent

The Fox Chase is a 1928 American animated comedy short film directed by Walt Disney. It features Oswald the Lucky Rabbit. It was released on June 25, 1928.

== Story ==
Full short

Oswald is in a fox chase competition, with other participants and several dogs. The fox teases the dogs and the competition owner blows a horn for everyone to be prepared, the owner of the competition throws a gun as a way of saying that the competition has started. Everyone runs forward and Oswald and Horace are left behind while Horace is jumping in the same corner and throws Oswald up and makes him go down on tail like a playground slide instead of running.

Horace is stubborn and doesn't want to move on just to make fun of Oswald while the poor rabbit gets hurt. Oswald even so tries two times to mount the horse jumping on his back but Horace prevents it and he gets up higher. Oswald also tries to put a ladder behind Horace, but it doesn't work. Oswald tries to tie a ladder to Horace's tail and Horace finally runs, but it's just to keep making fun of Oswald and not let him upstairs.

One of the dogs tries to bite the fox, but the fox slaps him with his own tail. The fox jumps over the wall and a furry dog tries to chase it and ends up hitting the wall and falls on its belly up. Other dogs jump on the belly to jump high to pass the wall. The last one has so much strength on the belly of the furry one that the furry one flies up a little and falls and gets back on his feet and jumps the wall. A sausage dog also jumps and a very tiny puppy appears, who can't jump but tries to grab the wall.

Oswald continues to hold on to the ladder tied to Horace's tail as Horace continues to run, until the ladder unties Horace's tail and Oswald and the ladder are hitting and dragging on the ground. The ladder rises and Oswald tells Horace to get close to him. Oswald manages to get one of his legs onto Horace, but the ladder and Horace move more further apart and Oswald's leg grows so long that he falls to the ground and is dragging himself with pain. Oswald screams loudly for Horace to stop for Oswald to mount him and the scream comes to life and pushes Horace for him to see that Oswald is in a moment of disaster. Oswald recharges the legs, gets up and jumps over to Horace and Oswald makes a push when he leans against Horace's back what his legs are spread out like a spider.

The cunning fox pushes the puddle in the direction the dogs are going to jump in and he laughs even before the dogs jump in as he already knew what was going to happen. When the dogs jump over the wall, they fall into the puddle, and they all come out of there soaking wet, until the furry dog jumps the wall and falls into the puddle and he climbs out. His skin shrinks and it stops on the belly. Some dogs are after the fox and the wiener dog passes/runs over them. The wise fox makes the wiener dog tie itself and she ties a knot on the body. She laughs at the dog and walks away still laughing, but the wiener dog unties himself and goes after the fox.

Oswald is finally mounted on Horace in the right way, until they see that the fox is running towards them. The fox goes straight and the two run after it, until Horace has his body upside down, minus his legs. Oswald puts the parts of Horace that were upside down to the correct side and they continue in search of the fox, until they trip over a huge rock and change places. The wiener dog passes/runs over them and Oswald holds his tail. Oswald manages to get on the dog and is happy that he is celebrating and jumping on the dog that his body ducks, but manages to straighten the dog's body by putting its legs forward instead of lifting it. The back of the dog's body also falls, Oswald catches it and bends the dog's tail to stay upright and not fall.

A dog and the furry dog spot the fox running towards them and hide in a tree with a hole to enter it and another small hole. When the fox passes under the tree, the two dogs go through the small path and take the fox and they start hitting her, but she curls up and leaves the middle of the fight. The dog is squeezing the furry dog, taking all his tongue out of his stomach, but the dog only realized when the fox was having a laugh, and scared, he puts all the tongue that came out of the furry stomach back into him and the two run after the fox.

The two dogs knew that the fox was hiding on the log, but the fox starts hitting the dogs with a club. Oswald is still on top of the wiener dog, but once Oswald finds the fox hiding on the log hitting the dogs with the club, Oswald jumps from the dog he was with and tries to see the fox hiding on the log, and he is also spanked. He gets an idea to have the dogs go further back while Oswald rolls up the log to get the fox out. Instead of finding the fox, the dogs and Oswald run away in fear after finding a skunk. It was actually the fox in a skunk costume, nobody won the competition and she starts laughing and the episode ends.
