= Tall Timber (1928 film) =

1928 film by Walt Disney

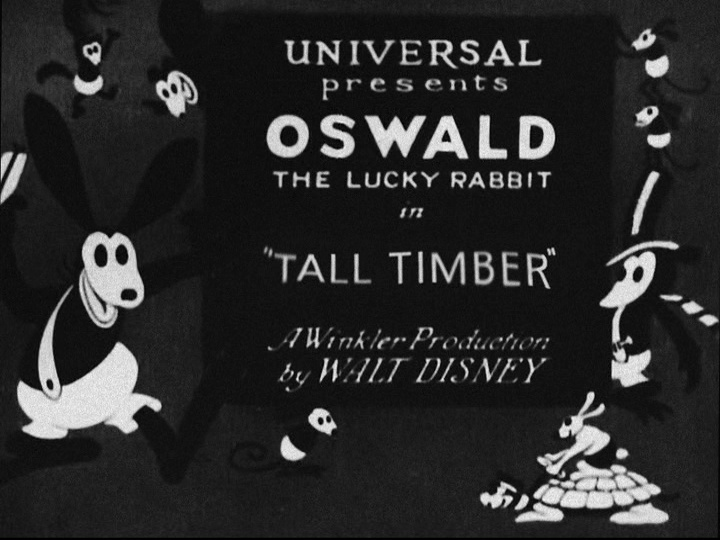
- Title card
- Directed by: Walt Disney
- Story by: Walt Disney
- Produced by: Charles Mintz; George Winkler
- Animation by: Ub Iwerks; Hugh Harman
- Color process: Black and white
- Production company: Winkler Pictures
- Distributed by: Universal Pictures
- Release date: July 9, 1928
- Running time: 7:32
- Country: United States
- Language: English

Tall Timber is a 1928 American animated short film directed by Walt Disney. It features Oswald the Lucky Rabbit. In terms of production, the film was for many years the last extant Oswald cartoon directed by Walt Disney, until late 2015, when Sleigh Bells, the Oswald cartoon made after Tall Timber, was rediscovered.

== Plot ==
Full short

Oswald is canoeing down a rough river. Upon reaching his destination, which is the lake, Oswald brings out his rifle and decides to go duck hunting. The ducks, however, are quite clever, and Oswald ends up shooting a hole in his boat, thus sinking it. He was unintendedly brought to dry ground by a moose.

While walking downhill, Oswald is chased by a boulder. His efforts to outrun the large rock are in vain as it rams him flat against a tree. In an attempt to restore his normal shape, Oswald drops a smaller rock on top of himself. This results in him having a more spherical physique, making it difficult for him to walk.

As he goes walking, Oswald stumbled and starts tumbling on the ground. In his path, two bear cubs are drinking syrup from maple trees. Oswald runs into one of them, causing that bear to be thrown upward. The cub's fall is cushioned when Oswald rolled back. Amazed by Oswald's bloated shape and bouncy qualities, the bears use him as a trampoline. Not willing to share with each other, the bears pull Oswald from opposite sides, stretching him back to his original form. Annoyed by their antics, Oswald chases one of the bears to what looks like a tree stump. The stump turns out to be the mother of the two bears who then chases Oswald into a cave. Upon entering the cave, Oswald and the big bear go into a tussle. Ironically, the big bear comes out with no fur on her torso and runs in embarrassment. Oswald, however, comes out wearing the big bear's fur like a jacket and celebrates by mocking Pete.

== Home media ==
The short was released on December 11, 2007, on Walt Disney Treasures: The Adventures of Oswald the Lucky Rabbit.

== See also ==
- Oswald the Lucky Rabbit filmography
