= Sleigh Bells (film) =

1928 film by Walt Disney and Ub Iwerks

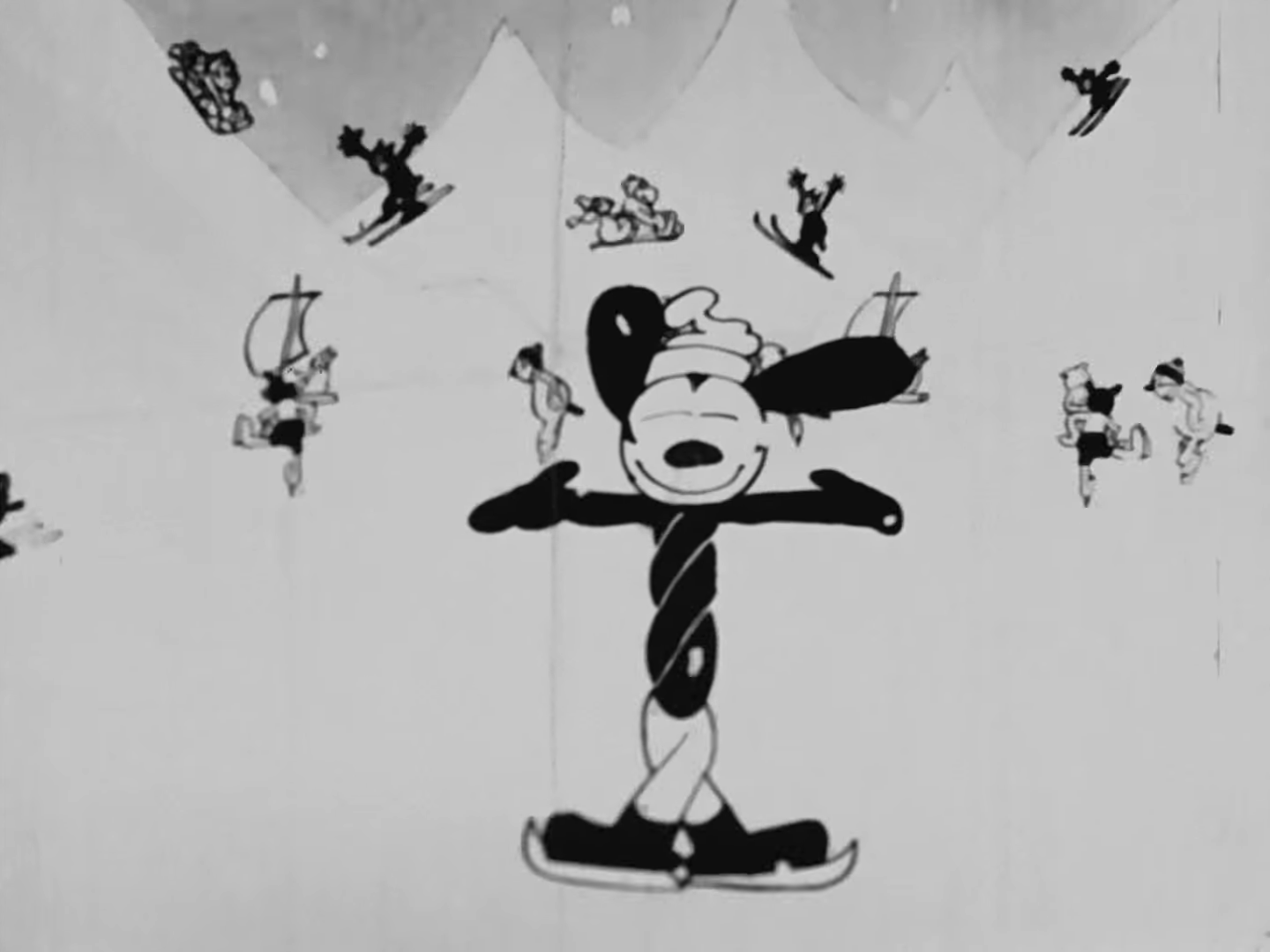
- A still from the silent film.
- Directed by: Walt Disney; Ub Iwerks
- Story by: Ub Iwerks; Walt Disney
- Produced by: Charles Mintz
- Production company: Winkler Pictures
- Distributed by: Universal Pictures
- Release date: July 23, 1928
- Running time: 6 minutes (one reel)
- Country: United States
- Language: English

Sleigh Bells is an American animated short film directed by Walt Disney and Ub Iwerks. It features Oswald the Lucky Rabbit. by Universal Pictures. The film was thought to be lost until a print was discovered in the BFI National Archives in 2015.

== Synopsis ==
The film has Oswald the Lucky Rabbit playing in an ice hockey game with surreal plot points. With a "winter wonderland backdrop", Oswald takes off his ear to form a balloon plus a laughing donkey, who gets the puck in the mouth which sticks.

== History ==
The short was animated by Walt Disney and Ub Iwerks and was released in 1928. The found footage of film was dated 1931 at a Soho film laboratory. That lab went out of business with its film being sent to the BFI archives in 1981. A lost Disney titles researcher searched through the BFI archive catalog and found its listing. The short was returned to Disney and has since been restored by the Walt Disney Animation Studios. Sleigh Bells was featured in It's a Disney Christmas: Seasonal Shorts program at BFI Southbank in December 2015.

== See also ==
- List of rediscovered films
