= Rollin Hamilton =

American animator (1898–1951)

- Born: Rollin Clare Hamilton; October 28, 1898; South Dakota, U.S.
- Died: June 3, 1951 (aged 52); Los Angeles, California, U.S.
- Occupation: Animator
- Years active: 1924–1943

Rollin "Ham" Clare Hamilton (October 28, 1898 – June 3, 1951) was an American animator. He was Walt Disney's first hire, and from 1924 to 1928, he worked as an animator for the Alice Comedies and Oswald the Lucky Rabbit shorts. In 1928, Hamilton and several other animators left the Walt Disney Studio to work at Winkler Pictures' new animation studio with the help of Charles Mintz. A year later, Hamilton briefly transferred to Walter Lantz's new studio before he helped fellow animators Hugh Harman and Rudolf Ising establish their own animation studio. He was one of the primary animators for the Looney Tunes and Merrie Melodies cartoons. From 1929 to 1934, he animated the Bosko character in the Harman-Ising studio.

He was one of the few animators who remained with Leon Schlesinger after Harman and Ising left in 1933. In Schlesinger's studio, he animated Buddy, Beans the Cat, and Porky Pig. He then worked as a freelance animator until 1940.

Hamilton died in 1951 of a heart attack.
