= Animated Pictures =

Defunct American animation studio

Animated Pictures Corp., Ltd.
- Industry: Animation
- Founded: 1930; 96 years ago
- Founder: Ub Iwerks
- Defunct: 1937; 89 years ago
- Fate: Reorganized as Cartoon Films, Ltd.
- Successor: Cartoon Films, Ltd.
- Headquarters: 9713 Santa Monica Blvd., Beverly Hills, California, United States
- Key people: Ub Iwerks (President); Pat Powers (Vice president, 1930–1936); Emil Offeman (General manager, 1930–1936)
- Products: Theatrical animated short films
- Number of employees: 75 (1933)
- Parent: Celebrity Productions, Inc. (1930–1936)

Animated Pictures Corp., Ltd. was an American animation studio based in Beverly Hills, California, headed by animator Ub Iwerks. The studio was best known for producing cartoon series such as Flip the Frog and Willie Whopper, as well as its ComiColor cartoon series. The short-lived studio was in operation between 1930 and 1937.

== History ==
=== Background and financing ===
Ub Iwerks was the director and head animator of the increasingly successful Mickey Mouse and Silly Symphony cartoons for Walt Disney, serving at Disney's right hand man with production. In early 1930, Iwerks accepted a contract with Disney's distributor, Pat Powers, to resign from the studio and produce cartoons under his own name. Iwerks brought along other Disney talent, like musical composer Carl Stalling and animators Merle Gilson and Ben Clopton.

Financial backers, led by Powers, suspected Iwerks was responsible for much of Disney's early success, and Powers' New York-based film company, Celebrity Productions, Inc., cut ties with Disney to support Iwerks' production venture. The studio was formally incorporated as Animated Pictures Corp., Ltd, with its original location based in Los Angeles, California.

=== Flip the Frog series and MGM contract (1930–1933) ===
Iwerks' first cartoon character, Flip the Frog, was announced as early as February 1930. Flip's first few cartoons, starting with Fiddlesticks in May, were released both in black-and-white and in Harriscolor, making them arguably the first sound cartoons released in color. Animated Pictures made a sales record in May after their first press announcement, even before the cartoons' release, as the European rights to the films were sold out before ten days. By early July, the studio signed a contract from Metro-Goldwyn-Mayer to handle distribution of the series. As the Flip cartoons progressed, the studio saw moderate success and expanded operations, hiring new staff and moving their production facility to Beverly Hills.

Several key creative personnel and trainee artists employed by Iwerks were later prominent figures in animation history. Grim Natwick, already a seasoned animator and creative force at Max Fleischer's cartoon studio for designing Betty Boop, was hired in 1931 to lead Animated Pictures' creative output, a position he held until late 1934. Natwick also hired animators Shamus Culhane, Al Eugster, and Berny Wolf, as well as musical composer Art Turkisher, all formerly with the Fleischer studio. One of Iwerks' first hires, an animator named Fred Kopietz, recommended Iwerks employ a friend from the Chouinard Art Institute. This friend, Chuck Jones, was hired and put to work as a cel washer in one of his first jobs before becoming a prominent cartoon director at Warner Bros. Despite the influx of talent from both Disney and Fleischer, Iwerks failed to rival either studio in terms of commercial success.

Flip the Frog, much like his cartoon contemporaries, bore various resemblances to Mickey Mouse in both his visual design, personality, and mannerisms. As the series progressed and with the new hired animators, the appearance of Flip gradually became less frog-like. Flip evolved into more of a down-and-out, Chaplin-esque character who always found himself in everyday conflicts surrounding the poverty-stricken atmosphere of the Great Depression.

=== Expansion, Willie Whopper and ComiColor series (1933–1934) ===
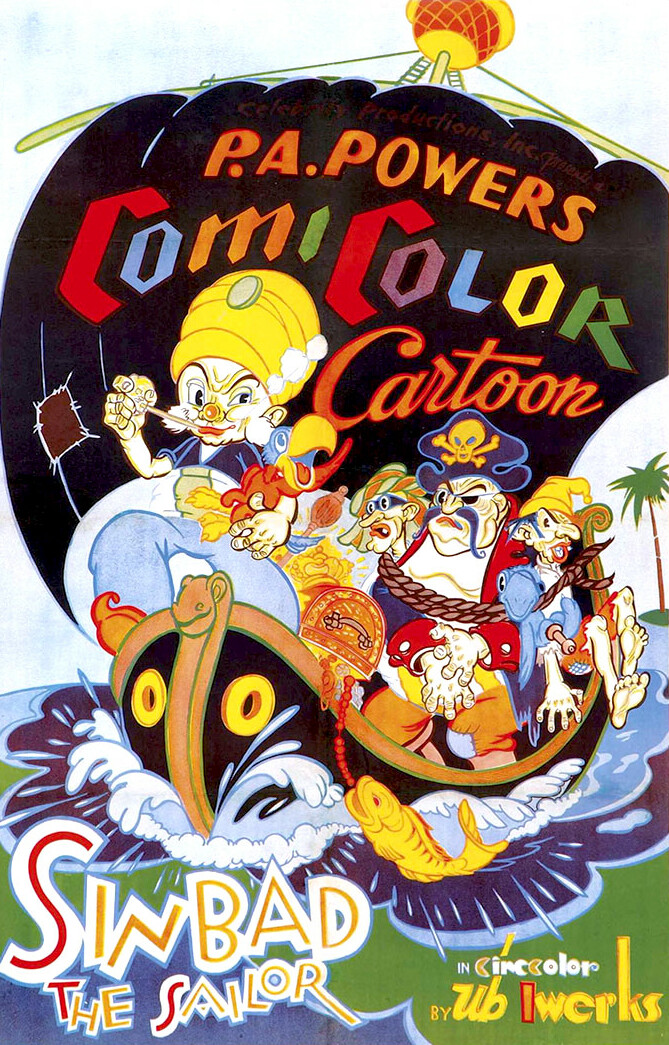
The cartoon "Sinbad the Sailor" was introduced by the studio in 1935

In 1933, Flip the Frog was phased out and replaced with two new cartoon series, one featuring Willie Whopper, and the other a series of color cartoons called ComiColors. The character Willie Whopper was a young boy who told of his many outlandish adventures. His fantastic accounts were as depicted on-screen as outright lies or "whoppers", and were usually preceded by his memorable catchphrase, "Say, did I ever tell ya this one?" The ComiColor cartoons mostly focused on fairy tales with one-off characters. Both series were started in 1933, with Willie featured in 14 cartoons through 1934, and the ComiColors produced until 1936.

The staff was doubled to meet the demand, and the studio was reorganized into different animation units so both series could be produced in tandem. The ComiColors were initially co-directed by Shamus Culhane and Al Eugster, and the Willie Whopper cartoons handled by two units: one with co-directors Grim Natwick and Berny Wolf, and another led by ex-Harman/Ising animators Robert Stokes and Norman Blackburn. Only the Willie Whopper cartoons were picked up by MGM for a distribution deal through 1933 and 1934, while each ComiColor cartoon was individually sold by Celebrity Productions to a wide variety of distributors who were interested. The ComiColor cartoons enjoyed some success overseas, with eleven countries closed for foreign distribution rights of cartoons in 1934 and as many as 17 foreign versions of individual films completed for distribution.

Walt Disney had exclusive rights to use the full-color Technicolor process for his studio's cartoons, so Iwerks opted for the cheaper two-color Cinecolor process for all ComiColor cartoons and two Willie Whopper cartoons, Davy Jones' Locker and Hell's Fire. In some instances, Iwerks also opted to cut costs for music production by utilizing cheaper canned music from commercial records in place of more expensive custom orchestrated scores by Carl Stalling or Art Turkisher. Examples of such could be heard throughout the Willie Whopper and ComiColor series.

=== Decline (1934–1937) ===
In 1934, financiers and staff of Iwerks' cartoons were starting to see the lackluster output of Iwerks' Animated Pictures studio in comparison to Disney, and were dropping support. MGM did not renew their contract with Iwerks for 1934-35 season, instead favoring the production of Happy Harmonies cartoons for Harman-Ising Productions, thus leaving Iwerks with only the independently-distributed ComiColor shorts in the studio's roster. The same year, Grim Natwick resigned from his supervisory role to work for Walt Disney on his first feature-length animated film, Snow White and the Seven Dwarfs, and many other key animators followed suit soon after.

Despite these dropouts, Animated Pictures, under Celebrity Productions, continued to find opportunities for additional work. They collaborated with English companies Revelation Films and Boots, Ltd. on a short educational film titled See How They Won, a film depicting the battle of a character named "John Careless" who falls victim to the "Bad Health Brigade." The concept and story were done in England, with Animated Pictures working on the film's production. After release, Revelation Films signed a deal with Celebrity Productions to produce a series of cartoons for a promotional campaign.

In addition, as early as June 19, 1935, Iwerks and Celebrity Productions discussed a deal of producing a cartoon series for the 1936-37 season based on the Reg'lar Fellers comic strip, by arrangement with comic creator Gene Byrnes. Meetings between Iwerks and Celebrity Productions took place to discuss the prospects of expanding or entirely moving Iwerks' animation studio to New York to start the series. These plans all ultimately fell through; the only cartoon to come out of the deal was Happy Days in 1936, which became the final cartoon to be produced by Iwerks for Pat Powers. Despite the deals with Byrnes and Revelation, and another season of ComiColors proposed by Pat Powers for the 1936-37 season, Powers and Celebrity Productions, Inc. withdrew all financial support from Iwerks' studio following the demise of the Reg'lar Fellas deal.

== Aftermath ==
=== Freelance ===
After losing the support and deals from Pat Powers, Iwerks managed to keep Animated Pictures afloat by finding freelance work, utilizing his own Beverly Hills studio and animation staff. Iwerks began producing and directing Technicolor Color Rhapsodies cartoons for Columbia Pictures' Screen Gems animation studio to help fill out their schedule on a subcontract basis. At the beginning of 1937, Iwerks signed a contract with Caravel Distributing Co. to produce animation for a promotional film sponsored by various advertisers, featuring cartoon characters like Otto Soglow's Little King.

Later in 1937, producer Leon Schlesinger enlisted Iwerks as a subcontractor to help increase his turnout of black-and-white Looney Tunes cartoons for release through Warner Bros. Pictures. When production fell behind on the first of these shorts, Porky and Gabby, three animators from Leon Schlesinger Productions - Robert Cannon, Bob Clampett, and Chuck Jones - an Animated Pictures Corp. alumnus - were sent to work at Animated Pictures and collaborate with the Iwerks staff.

Iwerks ultimately completed two Looney Tunes shorts: Porky and Gabby and Porky's Super Service. Both shorts featured Porky Pig, with the former also featuring Gabby Goat, a new character created by Schlesinger storyman (and Iwerks alumnus) Cal Howard, who sometimes also did the voice. While working on layout drawings for a third short, Porky's Badtime Story, a frustrated Iwerks - he reportedly hated the Porky Pig character - stopped reporting to work, and Clampett, a Harman-Ising alumnus who had long harbored directing aspirations, took over direction. After completing one more Looney Tunes short at the Iwerks studio, Get Rich Quick Porky, the Schlesinger staffers returned to their home studio on the Warner Bros. Sunset Boulevard lot and Clampett was given his own directorial unit.

=== Reorganization as Cartoon Films, Ltd. ===
Around December 1937, Iwerks struck a deal with UK-owned British Independent Exhibitors Association, a merger between distributors British Independent Exhibitors Co, Ltd. and Sound City, to produce a series of color cartoons. These cartoons featured a character of British cartoonist Lawson Wood's, a monkey named Gran'pop. To accommodate work on these cartoons, Iwerks' Animated Pictures was reorganized into a new venture under the same studio address, named Cartoon Films, Ltd., with producer Lawson Harris serving as president of the new establishment. In a deal with another representative of Iwerks' studio, David Biedermann, Educational Pictures signed distribution rights for the series to replace their contract with Paul Terry's Terrytoons. A deal for 24 Gran'pop cartoons was initially projected for the series, reportedly moved up to 50 cartoons a couple days later, and distribution deals with Grand National were discussed, but only three cartoons were completed in 1938 under Iwerks' supervision. All three shorts would eventually be released by Monogram Pictures in the 1940-1941 season. In the interim, the studio produced advertising shorts for businesses like Shell Oil Company, W. K. Kellogg Co., Lever Brothers, and Kraft Cheese, which were released around 1940 and sometimes promoted as "Minitoons".

As early as July 1939, Cartoon Films made a deal with a color film company, Dunningcolor, to introduce their newest three-strip color process of the same name in a series of animated shorts to be released by Columbia Pictures. However, on September 9, 1940, Ub Iwerks resigned from his studio to rejoin Walt Disney Productions as a technical developer, so the studio was turned over to Lawson Harris and animator Paul Fennell, including production of the Dunningcolor shorts. Two historical cartoons came out of the Dunningcolor contract, titled How War Came and Broken Treaties, which were completed and released in 1941. They were both narrated by Raymond Gram Swing, and the former of them was nominated an Academy Award for Best Cartoon Subject.

The same year, Cartoon Films completed Ub Iwerks' initial contract with Columbia's Screen Gems, with a final cartoon titled The Carpenters. In 1942, the studio opened up facilities in Chicago, IL and New York, NY. The studio moved to animating for war propaganda films for a time, as they contributed animation to a 1943 short for the United States Department of Agriculture, titled Six Legged Saboteurs. Information on Cartoon Films, Ltd. after this point is not conclusive, but in 1944, the studio's Beverly Hills address was occupied by animation studio Hugh Harman Productions.

== Technical innovations ==
Throughout most of the studio's existence, Iwerks' cartoons produced under Celebrity Productions' auspices utilized Pat Powers' own Cinephone system for sound recording, which was formerly used for Walt Disney's early sound cartoons, and the animation studio was supplied with its own sound equipment to utilize the technology.

Iwerks also experimented with stop-motion animation in combination with the multiplane camera. Although first developed in the 1920's by Lotte Reiniger, Iwerks made many substantial improvements in multiplane animation. This technology allowed for a three-dimensional look, separating layers of the background, resulting in a greater feeling of depth. He made a short called "The Toy Parade", which was never released in public. The 1934 animated short "The Headless Horseman" was the first time Iwerks used the multiplane effect, and it was utilized in both the ComiColor and Willie Whopper cartoons.

== Labor unrest ==
According to the recollections of various former Iwerks employees, management at Animated Pictures under Powers was harsh. Particularly, Iwerks' general manager and one of Pat Powers' right-hand men, Emil Offeman, demanded harsh work environments and footage quotas for the employed artists. Offeman's often misinformed work expectations caused Jim Pabian, a neophyte animator at the studio, to quit the studio and cancel his contract with Iwerks.

According to animator Shamus Culhane's autobiography, the last straw was when Offeman constantly harassed an ailing animator, Godfrey Bjork, about work quotas to the point of his hospitalization and death in 1933. Afterwards, meetings calling for unionization of animation studios were allegedly held by Grim Natwick, with dozens of animation workers in attendance and considered some of the first union meetings in the business.

== Filmography ==
=== 1930 ===
Series	Title	Release Date	Director	Distributor	Color Process	Film	Notes
Flip the Frog	Fiddlesticks	August 16, 1930	Ub Iwerks	Celebrity Productions/MGM	Harriscolor, B&W		Only released in Britain with Color.
Flip the Frog	Flying Fists	September 6, 1930	Ub Iwerks	Celebrity Productions/MGM	Harriscolor, B&W		1. Only released in Britain with Color.; 2. Currently only survives in B&W prints.
Flip the Frog	The Village Barber	September 27, 1930	Ub Iwerks	MGM	B&W		
Flip the Frog	Little Orphan Willie	October 18, 1930	Ub Iwerks	Celebrity Productions	Harriscolor, B&W		1. Rejected by MGM and was never copyrighted.; 2. Currently only survives in B&W prints.; 3. Was later released by Celebrity in 1935 when the rights reverted to Powers.
Flip the Frog	The Cuckoo Murder Case	October 18, 1930	Ub Iwerks	MGM	B&W		
Flip the Frog	Puddle Pranks	December 6, 1930	Ub Iwerks	Celebrity Productions	Harriscolor, B&W		1. Rejected by MGM and was never copyrighted.; 2. Currently only survives in B&W prints.; 3. Was later released by Celebrity in 1935 when the rights reverted to Powers.

=== 1931 ===
Series	Title	Release Date	Director	Distributor	Notes
Flip the Frog	The Soup Song	January 10, 1931	Ub Iwerks	MGM	
Flip the Frog	The Village Smitty	January 31, 1931	Ub Iwerks	MGM	
Flip the Frog	Laughing Gas	March 14, 1931	Ub Iwerks	MGM	
Flip the Frog	Ragtime Romeo	May 2, 1931	Ub Iwerks	MGM	
Flip the Frog	The New Car	July 25, 1931	Ub Iwerks	MGM	The First cartoon that featured the redesigned Flip design.
Flip the Frog	Movie Mad	August 29, 1931	Ub Iwerks	MGM	
Flip the Frog	The Village Specialist	September 12, 1931	Ub Iwerks	MGM	
Flip the Frog	Jail Birds	September 26, 1931	Ub Iwerks	MGM	
Flip the Frog	Africa Squeaks	October 17, 1931	Ub Iwerks	MGM	
Flip the Frog	Spooks	November 21, 1931	Ub Iwerks	MGM	

=== 1932 ===
Series	Title	Release Date	Director	Distributor	Film	Notes
Flip the Frog	Fire! Fire!	January 23, 1932	Ub Iwerks	MGM	Copyright Renewed	
Flip the Frog	The Milkman	February 20, 1932	Ub Iwerks	MGM	Copyright Renewed	
Flip the Frog	What a Life	March 26, 1932	Ub Iwerks	MGM	Copyright Renewed	
Flip the Frog	Puppy Love	April 30, 1932	Ub Iwerks	MGM	Copyright Renewed	
Flip the Frog	School Days	May 14, 1932	Ub Iwerks	MGM	Copyright Renewed	
Flip the Frog	The Bully	June 18, 1932	Ub Iwerks	MGM	Copyright Renewed	
Flip the Frog	The Office Boy	July 16, 1932	Ub Iwerks	MGM	Copyright Renewed	
Flip the Frog	Room Runners	August 13, 1932	Ub Iwerks	MGM	Copyright Renewed	
Flip the Frog	Stormy Seas	August 22, 1932	Ub Iwerks	MGM	Copyright Renewed	
Flip the Frog	Circus	August 27, 1932	Ub Iwerks	MGM	Copyright Renewed	
Flip the Frog	The Goal Rush	September 3, 1932	Ub Iwerks	MGM	Copyright Renewed	
Flip the Frog	The Pony Express	October 1, 1932	Ub Iwerks	MGM	Copyright Renewed	Retitled as The Phoney Express when reissued by Pat Powers
Flip the Frog	The Music Lesson	October 29, 1932	Ub Iwerks	MGM	Copyright Renewed	
Flip the Frog	The Nurse Maid	November 26, 1932	Ub Iwerks	MGM	Copyright Renewed	First cartoon in which the character is simply referred to as "Flip" in the opening titles.
Flip the Frog	Funny Face	December 24, 1932	Ub Iwerks	MGM		One of the few Flip the Frog cartoons that didn’t get renewed.

=== 1933 ===
Series	Title	Release Date	Director(s)	Distributor	Color Process	Film	Notes
Flip the Frog	Coo Coo, the Magician	January 21, 1933	Ub Iwerks	MGM	B&W	Copyright Renewed	
Flip the Frog	Flip's Lunchroom	March 25, 1933	Ub Iwerks	MGM	B&W	Copyright Renewed	
Flip the Frog	Techno-Cracked	April 29, 1933	Ub Iwerks	MGM	B&W	Copyright Renewed	Theorized to have been shot in Cinecolor.
Flip the Frog	Bulloney	May 27, 1933	Ub Iwerks	MGM	B&W	Copyright Renewed	
Flip the Frog	A Chinaman's Chance	June 24, 1933	Ub Iwerks	MGM	B&W	Copyright Renewed	
Flip the Frog	Paleface	August 12, 1933	Ub Iwerks	MGM	B&W	Copyright Renewed	
Flip the Frog	Soda Squirt	September 9, 1933	Ub Iwerks	MGM	B&W	Copyright Renewed	Features "By Heck" by Nat Shilkret and the Victor Orchestra and "Mama Inez by the Havana Novelty Orchestra.
Willie Whopper	The Air Race	Unreleased	Ub Iwerks	None	B&W		1. Features "Zampa" Overture by Herold, by the Victor Symphony Orchestra.; 2. The first Willie Whopper cartoon produced.; 3. Rejected by MGM and never copyrighted.; 4. It was remade into Spite Flight.
Willie Whopper	Play Ball	September 16, 1933	Ub Iwerks	MGM	B&W	Copyright Renewed	The first released Willie Whopper cartoon.
Willie Whopper	Spite Flight	October 14, 1933	Ub Iwerks	MGM	B&W	Copyright Renewed	A remake of the unreleased Willie Whopper cartoon, The Air Race.
Willie Whopper	Stratos Fear	November 11, 1933	Ub Iwerks	MGM	B&W	Copyright Renewed	1. First short with Willie's redesign.; 2. First credit for Pat Powers as P. A. Powers.
ComiColor	Jack and the Beanstalk	December 23, 1933	Shamus Culhane, AI Eugster, & Ub Iwerks	Celebrity Productions	Cinecolor	Copyright Renewed	The First ComiColor cartoon.

=== 1934 ===
Series	Title	Release Date	Director(s)	Distributor	Color Process	Film	Notes
Willie Whopper	Davy Jones Locker	January 13, 1934	Ub Iwerks	MGM	Cinecolor	Copyright Renewed	Produced in Cinecolor.
ComiColor	The Little Red Hen	February 16, 1934	Shamus Culhane, AI Eugster, & Ub Iwerks	Celebrity Productions	Cinecolor	Copyright Renewed	
Willie Whopper	Hell's Fire	February 17, 1934	Ub Iwerks	MGM	Cinecolor	Copyright Renewed	1. Retitled to "Masquerade Holiday" and “Vulcan Entertains" for reissues.; 2. The full Cinecolorversion was once considered lost, but has since been found.
Willie Whopper	Robin Hood Jr.	March 10, 1934	Ub Iwerks	MGM	B&W	Copyright Renewed	
ComiColor	The Brave Tin Soldier	April 7, 1934	Shamus Culhane, AI Eugster, & Ub Iwerks	Celebrity Productions	Cinecolor	Copyright Renewed	
Willie Whopper	Insultin' the Sultan	April 14, 1934	Ub Iwerks	MGM	B&W	Copyright Renewed	
ComiColor	Puss in Boots	May 17, 1934	Shamus Culhane, AI Eugster, & Ub Iwerks	Celebrity Productions	Cinecolor	Copyright Renewed	
Willie Whopper	Reducing Créme	May 19, 1934	Ub Iwerks	MGM	B&W	Copyright Renewed	
Willie Whopper	Rasslin' Round	June 1, 1934	Ub Iwerks	MGM	B&W	Copyright Renewed	
ComiColor	The Queen of Hearts	June 25, 1934	Shamus Culhane, AI Eugster, & Ub Iwerks	Celebrity Productions	Cinecolor	Copyright Renewed	
Willie Whopper	Cave Man	July 6, 1934	Ub Iwerks	MGM	B&W	Copyright Renewed	Features "Somebody Stole My Gal" and "Lafayette" by Bennie Moten
Willie Whopper	Jungle Jitters	July 24, 1934	Ub Iwerks	MGM	B&W	Copyright Renewed	
ComiColor	Aladdin and the Wonderful Lamp	August 10, 1934	Shamus Culhane & Ub Iwerks	Celebrity Productions	Cinecolor	Copyright Renewed	
Willie Whopper	The Good Scout	September 1, 1934	Ub Iwerks	MGM	B&W	Copyright Renewed	1. Features "Smiles" by Boyd Senter and "Milenberg Joys" by McKinney's Cotton Pickers.; 2. Has a Bosko cameo.
Willie Whopper	Viva Willie	September 20, 1934	Ub Iwerks	MGM	B&W	Copyright Renewed	Final Willie Whopper cartoon & final Iwerks cartoon distributed by MGM.
ComiColor	The Headless Horseman	October 1, 1934	Shamus Culhane, Al Eugster, & Ub Iwerks	Celebrity Productions	Cinecolor	Copyright Renewed	
ComiColor	The Valiant Tailor	October 29, 1934	Shamus Culhane, Al Eugster, & Ub Iwerks	Celebrity Productions	Cinecolor		Retitled "The King's Tailor" by Castle Films.
ComiColor	Don Quixote	November 26, 1934	Shamus Culhane, Al Eugster, & Ub Iwerks	Celebrity Productions	Cinecolor	Copyright Renewed	
ComiColor	Jack Frost	December 24, 1934	Shamus Culhane, Al Eugster, & Ub Iwerks	Celebrity Productions	Cinecolor		

=== 1935 ===
Series	Title	Release Date	Director(s)	Distributor	Color Process	Film	Notes
ComiColor	Little Black Sambo	February 6, 1935	Shamus Culhane, Al Eugster, & Ub Iwerks	Celebrity Productions	Cinecolor		
ComiColor	The Brementown Musicians	March 6, 1935	Shamus Culhane, Al Eugster, & Ub Iwerks	Celebrity Productions	Cinecolor		
ComiColor	Old Mother Hubbard	April 3, 1935	Shamus Culhane, Al Eugster, & Ub Iwerks	Celebrity Productions	Cinecolor		
ComiColor	Mary's Little Lamb	May 1, 1935	Shamus Culhane, Al Eugster, & Ub Iwerks	Celebrity Productions	Cinecolor		
ComiColor	Summertime	June 15, 1935	Shamus Culhane, Al Eugster, & Ub Iwerks	Celebrity Productions	Cinecolor		
ComiColor	Sinbad the Sailor	July 30, 1935	Shamus Culhane, Al Eugster, & Ub Iwerks	Celebrity Productions	Cinecolor		
ComiColor	The Three Bears	August 30, 1935	Shamus Culhane, Al Eugster, & Ub Iwerks	Celebrity Productions	Cinecolor		
ComiColor	Balloon Land	September 30, 1935	Ub Iwerks	Celebrity Productions	Cinecolor		Features "Buffoon" by the Victor Concert Orchestra and "Parade of the Wooden Soldiers" by the International Novelty Orchestra.
ComiColor	Simple Simon	November 15, 1935	Ub Iwerks	Celebrity Productions	Cinecolor		
ComiColor	Humpty Dumpty	December 30, 1935	Al Eugster, Ub Iwerks	Celebrity Productions	Cinecolor		

=== 1936 ===
Series	Title	Release Date	Director(s)	Distributor	Color Process	Film	Notes
ComiColor	Ali Baba	January 30, 1936	Shamus Culhane, Al Eugster, & Ub Iwerks	Celebrity Productions	Cinecolor		
ComiColor	Tom Thumb	March 30, 1936	Ub Iwerks	Celebrity Productions	Cinecolor		
ComiColor	Dick Whittington's Cat	May 30, 1936	Ub Iwerks	Celebrity Productions	Cinecolor		
ComiColor	Little Boy Blue	July 30, 1936	Ub Iwerks	Celebrity Productions	Cinecolor		
ComiColor	Happy Days	September 30, 1936	Ub Iwerks	Celebrity Productions	Cinecolor		1. The Last ComiColor cartoon.; 2. Features characters from the comic strip Reg'lar Fellers.; 3. The last cartoon made before Celebrity Productions pulled its funding.
Color Rhapsody	Two Lazy Crows	November 26, 1936	Ub Iwerks	Columbia Pictures Corporation	Technicolor	Copyright Renewed	First Color Rhapsody directed by Iwerks

=== 1937 ===
Series	Title	Release Date	Director	Distributor	Color Process	Notes
Color Rhapsody	Skeleton Frolic	January 29, 1937	Ub Iwerks	Columbia Pictures Corporation	Technicolor	Remake of 1929’s The Skeleton Dance, which Iwerks animated.
Color Rhapsody	Merry Mannequins	March 19, 1937	Ub Iwerks	Columbia Pictures Corporation	Technicolor	
Looney Tunes	Porky and Gabby	May 15, 1937	Ub Iwerks	Warner Bros. Productions	B&W	The First Looney Tune by Iwerks and debut of Gabby Goat.
Color Rhapsody	The Foxy Pup	May 21, 1937	Ub Iwerks	Columbia Pictures Corporation	Technicolor	
Looney Tunes	Porky's Super Service	July 3, 1937	Ub Iwerks	Warner Bros. Productions	B&W	1. The Last Looney Tune by Iwerks.; 2. Bob Clampett would complete Porky's Badtime Story which Iwerks had begun.

=== 1938 ===
Series	Title	Release Date	Director	Distributor	Color Process	Notes
Color Rhapsody	The Horse on the Merry-Go-Round	February 17, 1938	Ub Iwerks	Columbia Pictures Corporation	Technicolor	
Color Rhapsody	Snow Time	April 14, 1938	Ub Iwerks	Columbia Pictures Corporation	Technicolor	One of very few Color Rhapsody cartoons that didn’t get renewed.
Color Rhapsody	The Frog Pond	August 12, 1938	Ub Iwerks	Columbia Pictures Corporation	Technicolor	
Color Rhapsody	Midnight Frolics	November 24, 1938	Ub Iwerks	Columbia Pictures Corporation	Technicolor	

=== 1939 ===
Series	Title	Release Date	Director	Distributor	Color Process	Notes
Color Rhapsody	The Gorilla Hunt	February 24, 1939	Ub Iwerks	Columbia Pictures Corporation	Technicolor	
Color Rhapsody	Nell’s Yells	June 30, 1939	Ub Iwerks	Columbia Pictures Corporation	Technicolor	
Color Rhapsody	Crop Chasers	September 22, 1939	Ub Iwerks	Columbia Pictures Corporation	Technicolor	

=== 1940 ===
Series	Title	Release Date	Director(s)	Distributor	Color Process	Film	Notes
Color Rhapsody	Blackboard Revue	March 15, 1940	Ub Iwerks	Columbia Pictures Corporation	Technicolor	Copyright Renewed	
Color Rhapsody	The Egg Hunt	May 31, 1940	Ub Iwerks, Paul Fennell	Columbia Pictures Corporation	Technicolor	Copyright Renewed	
Color Rhapsody	Ye Olde Swap Shoppe	June 28, 1940	Ub Iwerks	Columbia Pictures Corporation	Technicolor	Copyright Renewed	
Gran' Pop Monkey	A Busy Day	July 22, 1940	Ub Iwerks	Monogram Pictures	Cinecolor		1. Completed in 1938, but not released until 1940.; 2. Nearly complete with color.
Color Rhapsody	Wise Owl	December 5, 1940	Ub Iwerks	Columbia Pictures Corporation	Technicolor	Copyright Renewed	1. The Last Color Rhapsody directed by Iwerks.; 2. The Last cartoon Ub Iwerks directed at the studio before returning to Disney.

=== 1941 ===
Series	Title	Release Date	Director(s)	Distributor	Color Process	Film	Notes
Gran' Pop Monkey	Beauty Shoppe	January 19, 1941	Ub Iwerks	Monogram Pictures	Cinecolor		1. Completed in 1938, but not released until 1941.; 2. Half complete with color.
Gran' Pop Monkey	Baby Checkers	February 2, 1941	Ub Iwerks	Monogram Pictures	Cinecolor		1. Completed in 1938, but not released until 1941.; 2. Currently only survives in B&W prints.
Color Rhapsody	The Carpenters	March 14, 1941	Ub Iwerks, Paul Fennell	Columbia Pictures Corporation	Technicolor	Copyright Renewed	The Final Color Rhapsody completed by Iwerks as part of his contract.
This Changing World	Broken Treaties	August 1, 1941	Paul Fennell	Columbia Pictures Corporation	Dunningcolor	Copyright Renewed	1. Volume 1, Chapter 2; 2. Released in the wrong order.
This Changing World	How War Came	November 7, 1941	Paul Fennell	Columbia Pictures Corporation	Dunningcolor	Copyright Renewed	1. Volume 1, Chapter 1; 2. Released in the wrong order.

=== Advertisments and Government Work ===
Title	Release Date	Company	Product	Color Process	Film	Notes
See How They Won	October 14, 1935	Revelation Films Limited	Boots Chemists	Cinecolor		Retitled “The Microbe Army” for TV release.
Leave it to John	1936	Revelation Films Limited	Boots Chemists	Cinecolor	Lost(?)	
A Date With Kate	1939	Swift & Company	Brookfield Butter	Technicolor		
Pebble Punch	1940	The Coca-Cola Company	Coca-Cola	Technicolor		Minitoons presents
A Squirt in Time	1940	Shell Oil Company, Inc.	Golden Shell Motor Oil	Technicolor		
Cops and Robbers	1940	Shell Oil Company, Inc.	Golden Shell Motor Oil	Technicolor		
Piston Rodeo	1940	Shell Oil Company, Inc.	Golden Shell Motor Oil	Technicolor		
Time Counts	1940	Shell Oil Company, Inc.	Golden Shell Motor Oil	Technicolor		
Cross Country Run	1940	Shell Oil Company, Inc.	Golden Shell Motor Oil	Technicolor		
The Oilympic Games, Endurance Relay	1940	Shell Oil Company, Inc.	Golden Shell Motor Oil	Technicolor		
The Pantry Purge	1940	W. K. Kellogg Company	Rice Krispies	Technicolor		
Breakfast Pals	1940	W. K. Kellogg Company	Rice Krispies	Technicolor		
Breakfast Harmony	1940	W. K. Kellogg Company	Rice Krispies	Technicolor		
Singing, Sinking, Sunk	1940	W. K. Kellogg Company	Rice Krispies	Technicolor		
Let’s Come Clean	1940	Lever Brothers	Rinso	Technicolor		
Grime Does Not Pay	1940	Lever Brothers	Rinso	Technicolor		
Foiled Again	1940	Lever Brothers	Rinso	Technicolor		
Meet the Champ	1940	Lever Brothers	Rinso	Technicolor		
Week-End Par	1940	Kraft Cheese Company	Malted Milk	Technicolor		
Does The Shoe Fit?	1940	Kraft Cheese Company	Malted Milk	Technicolor		
Energy Up-Batter Up	1940	Kraft Cheese Company	Malted Milk	Technicolor		
Milk With Oomph	1940	Kraft Cheese Company	Malted Milk	Technicolor		
He’s Champion	1940	Miller’s Mutual Flour Association	Flour	Unknown		
(Animated Portions)	1940	Westinghouse Electric & Mfg. Co.	Westinghouse Minute Movies	Unknown		
Keep This Under Your Hood	1940	Ford Motor Co.	Parts	Technicolor		Non-Theatrical
Six Legged Sabotuers	1943	United States Department of Agriculture	Educational	B&W		Animated Portions. The last known project Cartoon Films worked on.

== Image gallery ==
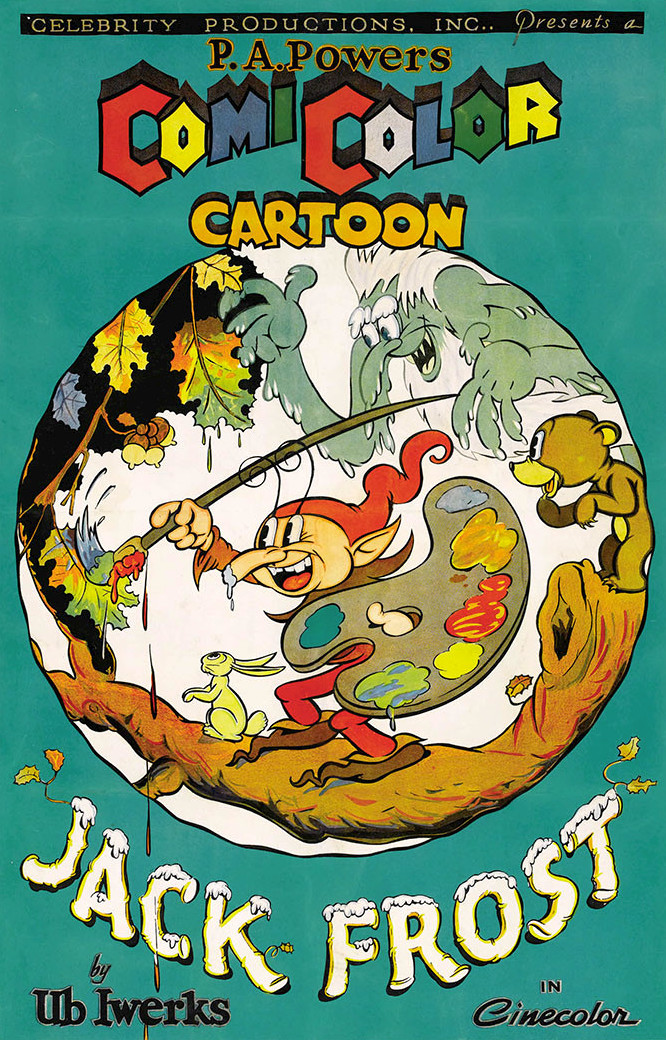
"Jack Frost" (1934)

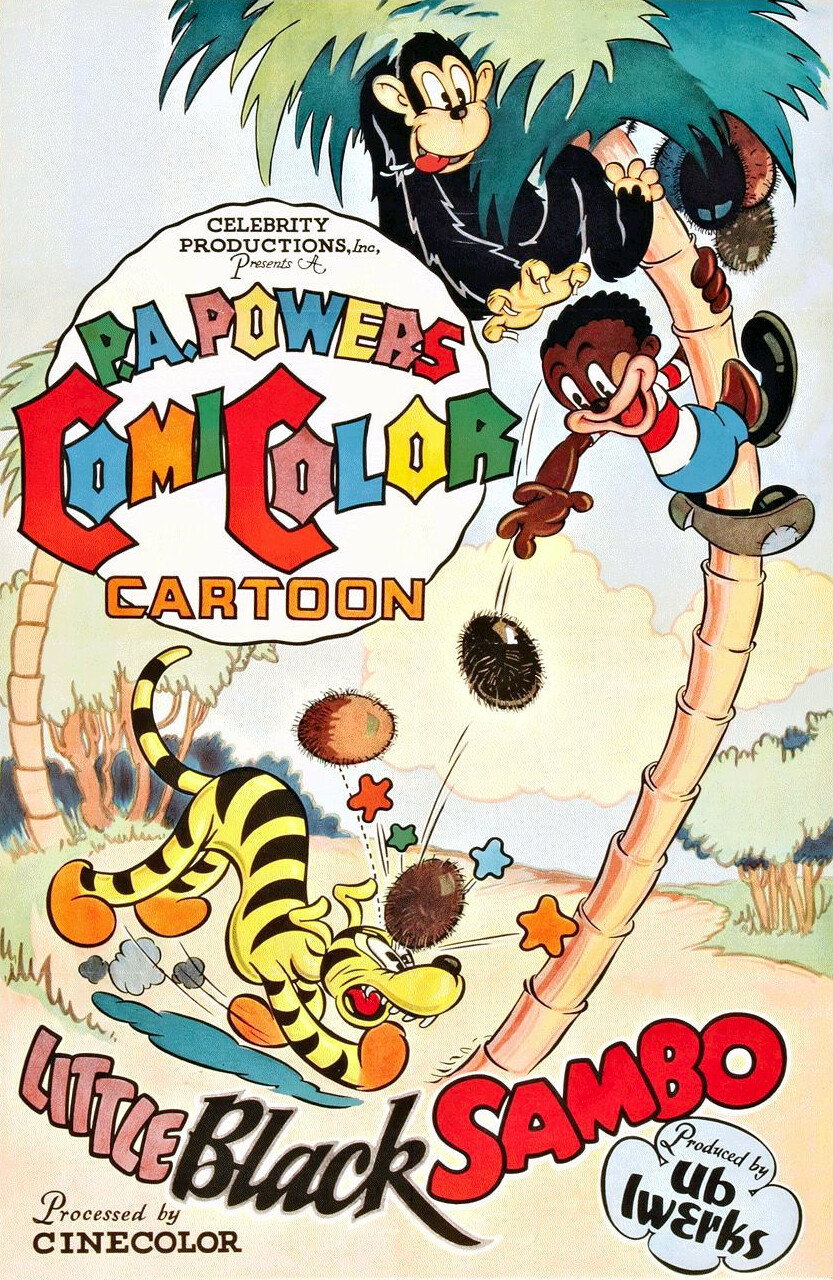
"Little Black Sambo" (1935)

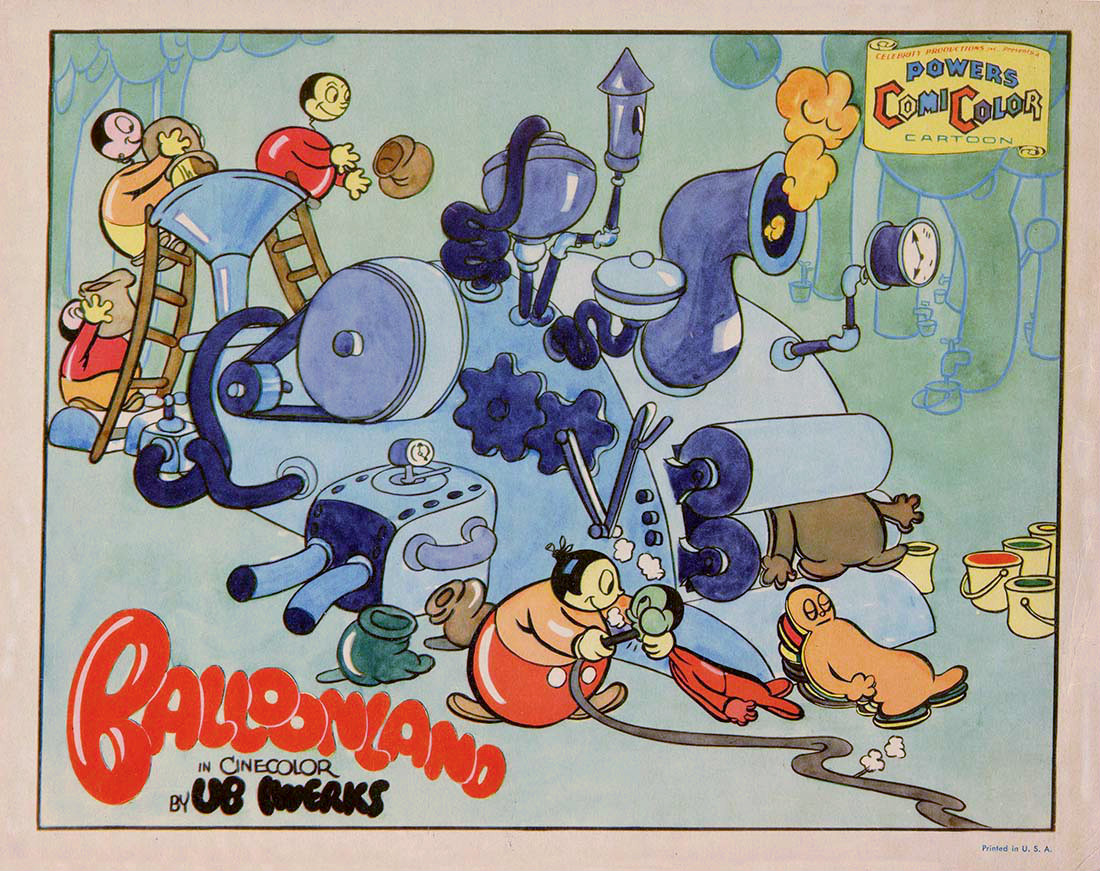
"Balloon Land" (1935)
