= Get Rich Quick Porky =

1937 film by Robert Clampett

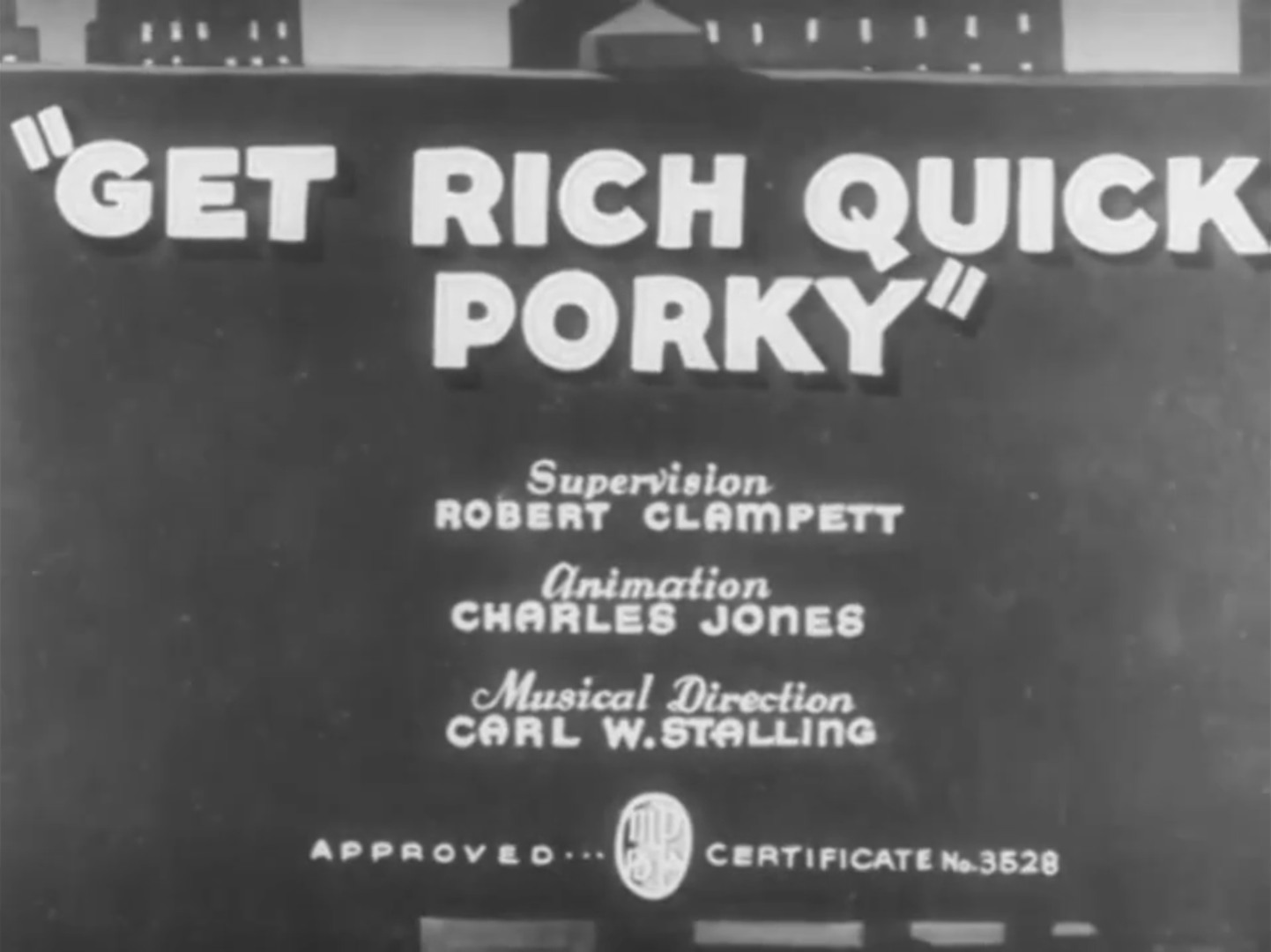
- Title card
- Directed by: Robert Clampett
- Produced by: Leon Schlesinger
- Starring: Mel Blanc; Earle Hodgins; Cal Howard; Shirley Reed; Billy Bletcher (all uncredited)
- Music by: Carl W. Stalling
- Animation by: Charles Jones Uncredited Animation: Robert Cannon; John Carey; Bill Hammer; Jerry Hathcock; Tom Massey; Norm McCabe
- Color process: Black-and-white
- Production company: Leon Schlesinger Productions
- Distributed by: Warner Bros. Productions; The Vitaphone Corporation
- Release date: August 28, 1937
- Running time: 7 minutes
- Country: United States
- Language: English

Get Rich Quick Porky is a 1937 American animated comedy short film directed by Robert Clampett. The short was released on August 28, 1937. It is the 90th film in the Looney Tunes series, the 28th cartoon to feature Porky Pig and the third and final cartoon to feature Gabby Goat.

== Plot ==
A con artist, John Gusher, operates a get-rich-quick scheme where he sells land under the promise of natural petroleum, which he fakes by using an irrigation sprinkler on an otherwise worthless piece of greenery. He finds Porky trying to deposit money into a bank for a promised 2% interest, to Gabby's chagrin, who believes that Porky should use it on pleasure. John easily convinces Porky and Gabby to invest in his scheme and makes them sign a contract.

Porky and Gabby haplessly try to extract petroleum, with Gabby finding an empty can of petroleum. A dog wanders into the site and finds a bone dug up by Porky, which it buries somewhere else, only for a small gusher of petroleum to launch it upward. He repeatedly fails to bury the bone and is launched up himself. Gabby rides a jackhammer, drilling into the earth and out again. The dog meets a gopher who uses a magic trick to make the bone disappear and appear in the dog's left ear. The gopher then tricks the dog into being shot with petroleum while he hides the bone, much to the dog's sadness.

Porky finds some oil, only for John to turn off the irrigation and having his scheme discovered. An enraged Porky is sarcastically given $1 by John, only for Gabby to activate an actual oil vein and launch the trio into the air. As the deed is technically valid, Porky fights with John over the deed, only for Gabby to hit John with the jackhammer. Porky believes him to have retrieved the deed, only to find himself holding the bone. The gopher emerges and transmutes the bone into the deed under the request that Porky and Gabby allows him into a business partnership.

== Voice cast ==
- Mel Blanc as Porky Pig, Dog
- Earle Hodgins as Oil Land Hustler
- Cal Howard as Gabby Goat
- Shirley Reed as Gopher
- Billy Bletcher as Driver

== Production ==
Chuck Jones, later to be famed as a director, is credited as animator on the short, whose working title was The Oily Bird Gets Porky. Get Rich Quick Porky marked the fourth and final short Clampett, Jones and Robert Cannon worked on while on loan from Leon Schlesinger Productions to Ub Iwerks' Animated Pictures Corp. Iwerks had directed Porky and Gabby and Porky's Super Service before quitting the project. Clampett assumed official directorial duties in his stead, with Jones assisting him by drawing the character layout drawings. Former Iwerks animators Jerry Hatchcock and Bill Hammer were swiftly poached by Schlesinger and worked on a majority of the animation in the film.

Unlike the two Iwerks films and Porky's Badtime Story, which were written at Schlesinger primarily by Cal Howard, the storyboard for Get Rich Quick Porky was devised entirely by Clampett himself at Animated Pictures. Howard did work on Get Rich Quick Porky as the voice artist for Gabby Goat. Following completion of the short, Clampett, Jones, and Cannon returned to the Warner Bros. Sunset Boulevard studio lot where the Schlesinger studio was based. Under the auspices of a new subcontracting setup run by Leon Schlesinger's brother-in-law, Ray Katz, Clampett would be given his own unit, with Jones as his lead animator until the latter became a director as well in 1938.

== Home media ==
Get Rich Quick Porky is available on disc 2 of the Porky Pig 101 DVD set.

== See also ==
- Porky Pig filmography
- Looney Tunes and Merrie Melodies filmography (1930–1939)
- List of animated films in the public domain in the United States
