= Flip the Frog =

Animated film series and fictional character

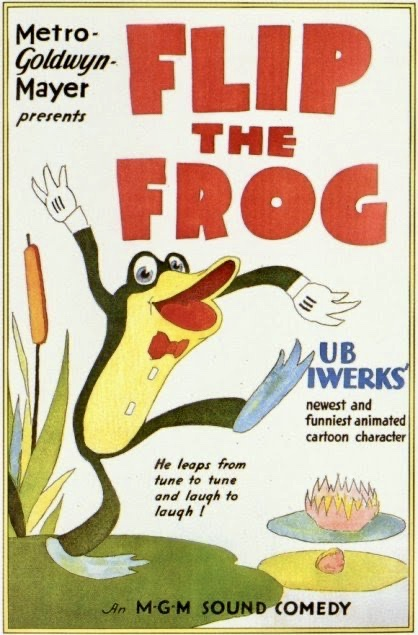
- First appearance: Fiddlesticks (1930)
- Last appearance: Soda Squirt (1933)
- Created by: Ub Iwerks

In-universe information
- Species: Frog
- Gender: Male

Flip the Frog is an animated cartoon character created by American animator Ub Iwerks. He starred in a series of 38 cartoons produced by Celebrity Pictures and distributed by Metro-Goldwyn-Mayer from 1930 to 1933. The series had many recurring characters, including Flip's dog, a mule named Orace, and a dizzy neighborhood spinster.

== History ==
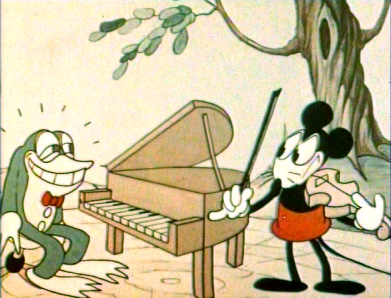
Flip the Frog in his first appearance, Fiddlesticks, opposite an unnamed mouse, who bears a striking resemblance to Mickey Mouse

Ub Iwerks was the lead animator for Walt Disney Productions, after he and Walt Disney left Winkler Pictures to work on the Mickey Mouse and Silly Symphony series. In 1930, after a series of disputes between the two, Iwerks left the company and went on to accept an offer from distributor Pat Powers to open a cartoon studio of his own, Animated Pictures, and receive a salary of $300 a week, an offer that Disney was unable to match at the time.

Iwerks was to produce new cartoons under Powers' Celebrity Pictures auspices and distributed by Metro-Goldwyn-Mayer. The first series he was to produce was to feature a character called Tony the Frog, but Iwerks disliked the name and was subsequently changed to Flip. Flip's personality is reminiscent of Mickey Mouse, which Iwerks created with Disney and had intended to compete with.

Ub Iwerks planned to release the series in both color and black-and-white versions through Celebrity Productions, Inc. The series attracted public attention in England by being the first color sound cartoon series, in the two-color British Multicolor System. These shorts were exhibited in England in color, but not in the United States where they were made. After four shorts had been produced (Fiddlesticks, Flying Fists, Little Orphan Willie and Puddle Pranks) MGM picked up the series. They agreed to exhibit Fiddlesticks and Flying Fists. Little Orphan Willie and Puddle Pranks were never copyrighted and remain in the public domain. MGM decided to produce the series entirely in black and white, releasing the ones produced in color in black-and-white versions only. Some have speculated that the episode Techno-Cracked (1933) may have been photographed in Cinecolor. The Cinecolor process was a new two-color process that came out in 1932, the year that Technicolor began phasing out its two-color system in favor of their new three-strip process. Iwerks would go on to make extensive use of Cinecolor with his ComiColor Cartoon series.

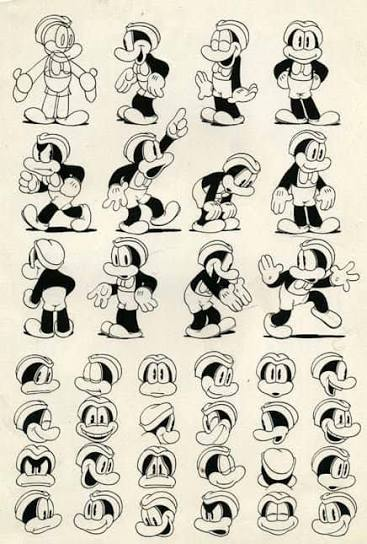
Model sheet of Flip the Frog, c. 1931, showing his evolution to less frog-like appearance

Iwerks' studio quickly began accumulating new talent, such as animators Fred Kopietz, Irv Spence, Grim Natwick, and Chuck Jones (who worked at the Iwerks studio as a cel-washer before going on to inbetweening and then animating at the Leon Schlesinger studio). After the first two cartoons, the appearance of Flip the Frog gradually became less froglike. This was done under the encouragement of MGM, who thought that the series would sell better if the character were more humanized. Flip's major redesign is attributed to Grim Natwick, who made a name for himself at the Fleischer Studios with the creation of Betty Boop. Natwick also had a hand in changing Flip's girlfriend. In earlier films, she was consistently a cat, but Natwick made Flip's new girlfriend, Fifi, a human who shared distinct similarities with Betty (even down to her spit curls).

This frog's personality also began to develop. As the series progressed, Flip became more of a down-and-out, Chaplin-esque character who always found himself in everyday conflicts surrounding the poverty-stricken atmosphere of the Great Depression. Owing to the influx of New York City animators to Iwerks' studio, such as Natwick, the shorts became increasingly risqué. In Room Runners (1932), Flip, out of cash and luck, attempts to sneak out of his hotel in order to avoid paying his past-due rent. Another gag has Flip watch a girl taking a shower through a keyhole. In The Office Boy, released the same year, Flip tries to secure a low-level office job and meets a shapely secretary. At one point in the short, a mischievous mouse that Flip tries to apprehend scoots up the secretary's skirt. In A Chinaman's Chance (1933), Flip and his dog track down the notorious Chinese criminal Chow Mein. While investigating in a Chinese laundry, Flip stumbles into an opium den, inhales the drug though an opium pipe he takes from a sleeping junkie, and begins hallucinating.

The character eventually wore out his welcome at MGM. His final short was Soda Squirt, released in October 1933. Subsequently, Iwerks replaced the series with a new one starring an imaginative child named Willie Whopper. Flip became largely forgotten by the public in the ensuing years, but the character would make a small comeback when animation enthusiasts and historians began digging up the old Iwerks shorts. All of the Flip cartoons are now available in the 2004 Region 2 Flip the Frog DVD set released by Mk2/Lobster in France. Most are available in Region 1, in particular on the Cartoons That Time Forgot series.

Commonwealth Pictures acquired the rights to the cartoons, with the rights being handed to Blackhawk Films and eventually Film Preservation Associates. The copyright for Fiddlesticks was renewed in 1959 by Exclusive Pictures Corp.; it entered the public domain in 2026, whereas the remaining copyrighted cartoons, if any, will enter the public domain as late as 2029.

== Flip the Frog Annual ==
In 1931, a Flip the Frog Annual was issued in England by Dean & Son Ltd. Published "by exclusive arrangement with Ub Iwerks, the originator of the film character, Flip The Frog", it was drawn by Wilfred Haughton, who also drew the early Mickey Mouse Annuals for Dean. The Annual only ran for one edition, based on Flip's ending in 1933 and the lack of success with it. The earlier, more frog-like character was used rather than the later version. The book contains 11 full cartoon strip stories, 4 colour plates and other one-page items that are not derived from any of his cartoons. All the adventures take place outside, unlike the cartoons, and feature additional characters, including a mischievous boy fox ("Freddie"), a policeman ("Robert"), an Uncle Flop (mentioned only), and others not shown in the cartoon films. An additional cartoon co-star included is Flap, Flip's frog girlfriend from Puddle Pranks (1930).

== Filmography ==
All cartoons dating from 1931 onwards have their copyrights renewed unless otherwise noted. Cartoons released in 1930 are public domain.

=== 1930 ===
No.	Title	Director	Animated by	Release date	Backgrounds	Distributor	Film	Notes
1	Fiddlesticks	Ub Iwerks	Ub Iwerks; Fred Kopietz; Tony Pabian	August 16, 1930	Fred Kopietz	Celebrity Productions		In two-strip Harriscolor; released by Celebrity Productions (early 1930) and MGM (August 16, 1930).
2	Flying Fists	Ub Iwerks	Ub Iwerks	September 6, 1930	Unknown	Celebrity Productions		Originally in two-strip Harriscolor, which remains lost. Released by Celebrity Productions (early 1930) and MGM (September 6, 1930).
3	Little Orphan Willie	Ub Iwerks	Ub Iwerks	October 18, 1930	Unknown	Celebrity Productions		Originally in two-strip Harriscolor, which remains lost. Rejected by MGM and never copyrighted, but released by Celebrity Productions domestically.
4	The Village Barber	Ub Iwerks	Ub Iwerks; Fred Kopietz	September 27, 1930	Unknown	Metro-Goldwyn-Mayer		The first cartoon both produced for and released by MGM.
5	The Cuckoo Murder Case	Ub Iwerks	Ub Iwerks; Irven Spence	October 18, 1930	Unknown	Metro-Goldwyn-Mayer		
6	Puddle Pranks	Ub Iwerks	Ub Iwerks	December 6, 1930	Unknown	Celebrity Productions		The first cartoon to open with Flip's specially-animated piano theme song. Originally in two-strip Harriscolor, which remains lost. Rejected by MGM and never copyrighted, but released by Celebrity Productions domestically.

=== 1931 ===
No.	Title	Director	Animated by	Release date	Distributor	Film	Notes
7	The Village Smitty	Ub Iwerks	Ub Iwerks; Grim Natwick	January 31, 1931	Metro-Goldwyn-Mayer		
8	The Soup Song	Ub Iwerks	Ub Iwerks; Fred Kopietz	January 31, 1931	Metro-Goldwyn-Mayer		
9	Laughing Gas	Ub Iwerks	Ub Iwerks	March 14, 1931	Metro-Goldwyn-Mayer		
10	Ragtime Romeo	Ub Iwerks	Ub Iwerks; Grim Natwick	May 2, 1931	Metro-Goldwyn-Mayer		
11	The New Car	Ub Iwerks	Ub Iwerks; Grim Natwick	July 25, 1931	Metro-Goldwyn-Mayer		First cartoon featuring the redesigned Flip.
12	Movie Mad	Ub Iwerks	Ub Iwerks	August 29, 1931	Metro-Goldwyn-Mayer		
13	The Village Specialist	Ub Iwerks	Ub Iwerks	September 12, 1931	Metro-Goldwyn-Mayer		
14	Jail Birds	Ub Iwerks	Ub Iwerks; Grim Natwick	September 26, 1931	Metro-Goldwyn-Mayer		
15	Africa Squeaks	Ub Iwerks	Ub Iwerks; Grim Natwick	October 17, 1931	Metro-Goldwyn-Mayer		
16	Spooks	Ub Iwerks	Ub Iwerks; Grim Natwick	December 21, 1931	Metro-Goldwyn-Mayer		

=== 1932 ===
No.	Title	Director	Animated by	Release date	Distributor	Film	Notes
17	The Milkman	Ub Iwerks	Ub Iwerks; Fred Kopietz; Grim Natwick	February 20, 1932	Metro-Goldwyn-Mayer	Copyright Renewed	
18	Fire-Fire	Ub Iwerks	Ub Iwerks	March 5, 1932	Metro-Goldwyn-Mayer	Copyright Renewed	
19	What a Life	Ub Iwerks	Ub Iwerks	March 26, 1932	Metro-Goldwyn-Mayer	Copyright Renewed	
20	Puppy Love	Ub Iwerks	Ub Iwerks	April 30, 1932	Metro-Goldwyn-Mayer	Copyright Renewed	
21	School Days	Ub Iwerks	Ub Iwerks	May 14, 1932	Metro-Goldwyn-Mayer	Copyright Renewed	
22	The Bully	Ub Iwerks	Ub Iwerks	June 18, 1932	Metro-Goldwyn-Mayer	Copyright Renewed	
23	The Office Boy	Ub Iwerks	Pete Burness; Chuck Jones; Fred Kopietz; Grim Natwick	July 16, 1932	Metro-Goldwyn-Mayer	Copyright Renewed	
24	Room Runners	Ub Iwerks	Shamus Culhane; Grim Natwick; Irven Spence	August 13, 1932	Metro-Goldwyn-Mayer	Copyright Renewed	
25	Stormy Seas	Ub Iwerks	Ub Iwerks; Grim Natwick	August 22, 1932	Metro-Goldwyn-Mayer	Copyright Renewed	
26	Circus	Ub Iwerks	Ub Iwerks	August 27, 1932	Metro-Goldwyn-Mayer	Copyright Renewed	
27	The Goal Rush	Ub Iwerks	Ub Iwerks; Grim Natwick	October 3, 1932	Metro-Goldwyn-Mayer	Copyright Renewed	
28	The Pony Express (Note: Retitled as "Phoney Express" when the cartoon was reissued by Pat Powers.)	Ub Iwerks	Shamus Culhane; Al Eugster; Grim Natwick	October 27, 1932	Metro-Goldwyn-Mayer	Copyright Renewed	
29	The Music Lesson	Ub Iwerks	Ub Iwerks; Shamus Culhane; Chuck Jones; Grim Natwick	October 29, 1932	Metro-Goldwyn-Mayer	Copyright Renewed	
30	Nurse Maid	Ub Iwerks	Shamus Culhane	November 26, 1932	Metro-Goldwyn-Mayer	Copyright Renewed	First cartoon in which the character is simply referred to as "Flip" in the opening titles.
31	Funny Face	Ub Iwerks	Shamus Culhane; Grim Natwick	December 24, 1932	Metro-Goldwyn-Mayer		Copyright not renewed, in the public domain.

=== 1933 ===
No.	Title	Director	Animated by	Release date	Distributor	Notes
32	Coo Coo the Magician	Ub Iwerks	Shamus Culhane; Grim Natwick	January 21, 1933	Metro-Goldwyn-Mayer	
33	Flip's Lunch Room	Ub Iwerks	Lee Blair; Shamus Culhane; Grim Natwick	April 3, 1933	Metro-Goldwyn-Mayer	
34	Techno-Cracked (Note: Possibly filmed in color.)	Ub Iwerks	Shamus Culhane	May 8, 1933	Metro-Goldwyn-Mayer	
35	Bulloney	Ub Iwerks	Shamus Culhane; Al Eugster; Ub Iwerks	May 30, 1933	Metro-Goldwyn-Mayer	
36	A Chinaman's Chance	Ub Iwerks	Shamus Culhane	June 24, 1933	Metro-Goldwyn-Mayer	
37	Pale-Face	Ub Iwerks	Shamus Culhane; Al Eugster	August 12, 1933	Metro-Goldwyn-Mayer	
38	Soda Squirt	Ub Iwerks	Lee Blair; Shamus Culhane; Al Eugster; Grim Natwick; Irven Spence	October 12, 1933	Metro-Goldwyn-Mayer	Last Flip the Frog cartoon.

== Home media ==
Thirty-seven of Flip's cartoons were compiled on the French Mk2/Lobster Films 2004 2-disc DVD set Flip the Frog.

Twenty-seven of Flip's cartoons are included in the two DVD collections Cartoons That Time Forgot: The Ub Iwerks Collection, Vol. 1 and 2.

Another early Flip short, Little Orphan Willie, while not included on any of the above DVD releases, is included on the DVD collection Return of the 30s Characters from Thunderbean Animation.

Iwerks retained the original camera negatives to the films. All thirty-eight of Flip's cartoons were released and restored from the negatives on Blu-ray in October 2023 by Thunderbean Animation. The Blu-ray has an introduction by documentary filmmaker and Ub Iwerks' granddaughter Leslie Iwerks.

== In popular culture ==
A clip of the character tap-dancing on a turtle from Fiddlesticks is featured on a television set in the music video for Eminem's song "The Real Slim Shady", which a viewer laughs at.

Footage from Room Runners is featured during the intro sequence of the Futurama episode "Children of a Lesser Bog".

In the Muppet Babies episode "The Great Muppet Cartoon Show", footage from "Funny Face" appears during the "We Love Cartoons" song.

== See also ==
- Golden age of American animation
