= Tick Tock Tuckered =

1944 film by Bob Clampett

- Directed by: Bob Clampett
- Story by: Warren Foster
- Based on: Porky's Badtime Story
- Produced by: Leon Schlesinger
- Starring: Mel Blanc
- Edited by: Treg Brown
- Music by: Carl W. Stalling
- Animation by: Thomas McKimson
- Color process: Technicolor
- Production company: Leon Schlesinger Productions
- Distributed by: Warner Bros. Pictures; The Vitaphone Corporation
- Release date: April 8, 1944
- Running time: 7:00
- Language: English

Tick Tock Tuckered is a Warner Bros. Looney Tunes cartoon directed by Bob Clampett. The cartoon was released on April 8, 1944, and stars Porky Pig and Daffy Duck. This is a color remake of the cartoon Porky's Badtime Story (1937), with Daffy filling the role that was previously played by Gabby Goat. A gag from Friz Freleng's cartoon Notes to You (1941) was also reused as well, while a reference to The Dover Boys (1942) is briefly made.

In the short, Porky and Daffy oversleep; after arriving at their work 2 hours late, their boss threatens to fire them if they are late again. That night, they resolve to sleep earlier than usual, in hopes of being able to wake up on time the next morning, but they are kept awake by animal noises, the brightness of the moonlight, and the effects of a thunderstorm on their house. When they arrive at work on time early the next morning, they realize that it's Sunday and that the company is closed for the day.

== Plot ==
The plot is basically the same as the plot of Porky's Badtime Story.

When Porky Pig and Daffy Duck realize that they have overslept, they end up rushing to work at the Fly-By-Nite Aircraft Company and attempt to sneak in. When Daffy winds the time clock backwards two hours and clocks in, the alarm goes off; their boss (a caricature of Clampett's immediate boss, production manager Ray Katz) catches them and in a cheerful, but sarcastic manner, states that if they were not going to make it, he would have sent their work to them. He then drops his friendly façade and angrily warns them that if they are late again they will be terminated. He then orders them to get to work, to which they dash into their office and close the door so fast that the sign on the door shatters.

That night at 8 p.m., Porky sets the alarm clock as Daffy complains about having to go to bed so early, but Porky reminds Daffy about their boss' threat to fire them if they are late again. Porky climbs into bed and they both fall asleep until they are awakened by the sound of a fighting dog and cat outside the window. Later, the moon emerges from behind the clouds and its light shines directly on Porky, waking him up. Porky makes several unsuccessful attempts to close the shade and ultimately ends up wrecking his bed. The moonlight also disturbs Daffy, who grabs a shotgun and shoots the moon, which then falls from the sky ("Unbelievable, isn't it?"). As the night progresses, a thunderstorm occurs while Porky is sleeping in Daffy's bed. Porky closes the window but then a leak begins dripping from the ceiling. When Daffy opens an umbrella in the house, Porky warns him that it is bad luck. Daffy dismisses Porky's superstition until a lightning strike destroys the umbrella. Frustrated, Daffy shouts that he "might as well try sleeping under Niagara Falls", then a torrent of water comes through the roof and rains down on them.

The next morning, Porky and Daffy are sleeping in the dresser drawers when the alarm clock goes off at 6 a.m. They hurry to get themselves ready to make sure they get to work on time. When they arrive, a sign on the door reads "Closed Sunday". Porky states that they do not have to work today, to which Daffy boxes himself ("Now he tells me!") before they rush home, run into the house and jump into the drawers to resume sleeping. When the alarm clock goes off again at 6:15. Porky shoots the alarm clock, which falls over and dies.

== Voice cast ==
- Mel Blanc as Porky Pig / Daffy Duck / Boss / Cat and Dog sounds

== Home media ==
- VHS 1986 - Viddy-Oh! For Kids Cartoon Festivals: Porky Pig and Daffy Duck Cartoon Festival Starring "Tick Tock Tuckered" - MGM/UA Home Video
- VHS 1988 - Cartoon Moviestars: Just Plain Daffy - MGM/UA Home Video
- Laserdisc 1992 - The Golden Age of Looney Tunes: Volume 2 - MGM/UA Home Video
- VHS 2001 - Looney Tunes: The Collectors Edition, Vol. 12 - Porky and Daffy - Warner Home Video/Columbia House
- DVD 2010 - Looney Tunes Super Stars' Daffy Duck: Frustrated Fowl (restored) - Warner Home Video

== See also ==
- Daffy Duck filmography
- Porky Pig filmography
- Looney Tunes and Merrie Melodies filmography (1940–1949)
