= The Great Carrot Train Robbery =

- Directed by: Robert McKimson
- Story by: Cal Howard
- Produced by: William L. Hendricks
- Starring: Mel Blanc; Pat Woodell; Billy Strange
- Edited by: Hal Geer
- Music by: William Lava
- Animation by: Ted Bonnicksen; Laverne Harding; Jim Davis; Ed Solomon
- Layouts by: Bob Givens; Jaime Diaz
- Backgrounds by: Bob Abrams
- Color process: Technicolor
- Production company: Warner Bros.-Seven Arts Animation
- Distributed by: Warner Bros.-Seven Arts; Vitagraph Company of America
- Release date: January 25, 1969
- Running time: 6 min
- Language: English

The Great Carrot Train Robbery is a 1969 Warner Bros.-Seven Arts Merrie Melodies cartoon directed by Robert McKimson. The short was released on January 25, 1969, and stars Bunny and Claude in their second and final short.

The short is the final "classic era" Warner Bros. cartoon with the voice of Mel Blanc.

== Plot ==
Bunny and Claude return and head to a train station, wanting to board the Carrot Express. The ticket attendant tells them that they cannot board, but Claude grabs the ticket attendant's shirt and he surrenders. Bunny and Claude introduce themselves to the ticket attendant, who passes out just before the train arrives. As Bunny and Claude board the train and enter one of the cars holding carrots, the ticket attendant calls the sheriff. The ticket attendant explains to the sheriff how he saw Bunny and Claude, and the sheriff hears and quickly jumps into his car.

The sheriff drives onto a road parallel to the railroad track, and he drives over several bumps, each bouncing him to a different spot in the car. The road intersects the railroad and just as the sheriff is crossing the tracks, the Carrot Express crashes into it, breaking half of the sheriff's car. The sheriff stops on top of a bridge, and just as the train passes below, he jumps into the funnel, causing him to become black from the ash, and then blown up into the air when he walks by the whistle. However, when the sheriff is walking on top of the cars, Claude comes out from a trapdoor on one of the cars and spots the sheriff, who gives chase. The sheriff chases Bunny across several cars, but misses a jump. As Claude runs back to his original car, the sheriff climbs back up onto the top of the train, but hits a tunnel.

Once Claude goes back into the car, the sheriff squeezes his way through the trapdoor and Bunny and Claude are forced to hide in two barrels. Not knowing Bunny and Claude are hiding, the sheriff hides in another barrel. Claude nails the sheriff's barrel closed and inserts a stick of dynamite before throwing it out, wishing the sheriff to have a "barrel of fun". The barrel bounces down several hills before exploding.

The sheriff uses a handcar to catch up to the train, but on an uphill section of track, Claude unhooks a section of the train, causing it to roll downwards towards the sheriff. The sheriff changes direction and the loose cars bump into him several times before the sheriff pedals himself into a closed track and hits a bumper.

Bunny and Claude finally stop the train, and Claude tells Bunny that the carrots are theirs. The sheriff, meanwhile, pays a farmer money to use his horse to catch Bunny and Claude. Just as Bunny and Claude are loading their car with carrots, the sheriff catches up to them and catches the duo red-handed. As the sheriff explains to Bunny and Claude that crime doesn't pay and carrot is the root of all evil, his horse eats some of the carrots! When the sheriff yells at the horse, Bunny and Claude manage to escape along with the remaining carrots from the train. The cartoon ends when sheriff chases Bunny and Claude into the horizon on his fat horse, which bounces when it gallops.
