= Willie Whopper =

Fictional character created by Ub Iwerks

- The Willie Whopper title card, showing Willie Whopper's original design.
- First appearance: The Air Race; April 30, 1933
- Last appearance: Viva Willie; September 21, 1934
- Created by: Ub Iwerks
- Designed by: Grim Natwick; Ub Iwerks

In-universe information
- Species: Human
- Gender: Male

Willie Whopper is an animated cartoon character created by American animator Ub Iwerks. The Whopper series was the second from Animated Pictures to be produced by Pat Powers and distributed through Metro-Goldwyn-Mayer. 14 shorts were produced in 1933 to 1934.

== History ==
Willie is a young lad who tells of his many outlandish adventures, which are then depicted on-screen. His fantastic accounts are, in fact, outright lies or "whoppers". His stories are usually preceded by his catchphrase, "Say, did I ever tell ya this one?"

The character's first-produced film was The Air Race (1933), in which Willie tells of how he entered and won the 1933 National Air Race—even receiving a kiss from Amelia Earhart in the end. The short reflects Iwerks' own fascination with aviation. One scene even involves a plane crashing into a "Fireworks" stand which, afterwards is reduced in spelling to "I WERKS" (the animator Ub Iwerks' last name).

The Air Race was initially left unreleased because distributor MGM rejected it, asking for a revision to explain more about why Willie entered the race. In the largely reanimated revision — Spite Flight (1933) — the story shows Willie interested in the race's cash prize because it will help him pay off his girlfriend's mom's mortgage. The new footage also turns Willie's racing rival into the girlfriend's landlord.

Animator Grim Natwick initially designed Willie for The Air Race and the subsequent Play Ball, the character's first theatrical release. He was, at first, tall and lanky, much like a boy version of the earlier Flip the Frog. Iwerks wasn't completely satisfied with this design and decided to make the character more "cartoonlike". By the series' fourth entry, Stratos-Fear, Willie became roly-poly and more endearing to audiences. Critics too especially went for this new change. Before 1933 was over, Willie also appeared in his first Cinecolor endeavor, Davy Jones' Locker.

1934 was the final production year for the Whopper series. The final entry in the series was Viva Willie released on September 20. Other Iwerks staffers on the series included Al Eugster, Norm Blackburn, Berny Wolf and Shamus Culhane (who referred to Willie as a "boy Baron von Münchhausen").

After MGM dropped Iwerks, they hired Iwerks' former colleagues at Winkler Pictures, Hugh Harman and Rudolf Ising to produce a cartoon series called Happy Harmonies directly for the studio; they had cut ties with Leon Schlesinger after producing Looney Tunes and Merrie Melodies cartoons for Warner Bros. Pictures until 1933. A 1934 cartoon, The Good Scout, features a cameo appearance from Bosko, possibly an in-joke by former Harman-Ising animators Robert Stokes and Norm Blackburn.

== Filmography ==
=== 1933 ===
No.	Title	Director	Release date	Distributor	Film	Home media release(s)	Notes
1	The Air Race	Ub Iwerks	April 30, 1933	Metro-Goldwyn-Mayer	The First Willie Whopper Cartoon.	Cartoons That Time Forgot (DVD); Ub Iwerks' Willie Whopper (Blu-ray/DVD)	First film in the series.; Rejected by MGM and never copyrighted.
2	Play Ball	Ub Iwerks	September 16, 1933	Metro-Goldwyn-Mayer	Copyright Renewed	Ub Iwerks' Willie Whopper (Blu-ray/DVD)	The first Willie Whopper cartoon to be widely released.
3	Spite Flight	Ub Iwerks	October 14, 1933	Metro-Goldwyn-Mayer	Copyright Renewed	Ub Iwerks' Willie Whopper (Blu-ray/DVD)	
4	Stratos-Fear	Ub Iwerks	November 11, 1933	Metro-Goldwyn-Mayer	Copyright Renewed	Cartoons That Time Forgot (DVD); Ub Iwerks' Willie Whopper (Blu-ray/DVD)	
5	Davy Jones' Locker	Ub Iwerks	December 9, 1933	Metro-Goldwyn-Mayer	Copyright Renewed	Ub Iwerks' Willie Whopper (Blu-ray/DVD)	Produced in Cinecolor.

=== 1934 ===
No.	Title	Director	Release date	Distributor	Home media release(s)	Notes
6	Hell's Fire	Ub Iwerks	January 6, 1934	Metro-Goldwyn-Mayer	Cartoons That Time Forgot (DVD); Ub Iwerks' Willie Whopper (Blu-ray/DVD)	Retitled to "Masquerade Holiday" and “Vulcan Entertains" for reissues.; The full Cinecolor version was once considered lost, but has since been found.
7	Robin Hood, Jr.	Ub Iwerks	February 3, 1934	Metro-Goldwyn-Mayer	Ub Iwerks' Willie Whopper (Blu-ray/DVD)	
8	Insultin' the Sultan	Ub Iwerks	April 14, 1934	Metro-Goldwyn-Mayer	Cartoons That Time Forgot (DVD); Ub Iwerks' Willie Whopper (Blu-ray/DVD)	
9	Reducing Creme	Ub Iwerks	May 19, 1934	Metro-Goldwyn-Mayer	Ub Iwerks' Willie Whopper (Blu-ray/DVD)	
10	Rasslin' Round	Ub Iwerks	June 1, 1934	Metro-Goldwyn-Mayer	Cartoons That Time Forgot (DVD); Ub Iwerks' Willie Whopper (Blu-ray/DVD)	
11	The Cave Man	Ub Iwerks	July 6, 1934	Metro-Goldwyn-Mayer	Ub Iwerks' Willie Whopper (Blu-ray/DVD)	
12	Jungle Jitters	Ub Iwerks	July 27, 1934	Metro-Goldwyn-Mayer	Ub Iwerks' Willie Whopper (Blu-ray/DVD)	
13	The Good Scout	Ub Iwerks	September 1, 1934	Metro-Goldwyn-Mayer	Cartoons That Time Forgot (DVD); Ub Iwerks' Willie Whopper (Blu-ray/DVD)	Features a Bosko cameo.
14	Viva Willie	Ub Iwerks	September 21, 1934	Metro-Goldwyn-Mayer	Cartoons That Time Forgot (DVD); Ub Iwerks' Willie Whopper (Blu-ray/DVD)	Final film in the series.

== Copyright ==
All of the Willie Whopper cartoons, with the lone exception of 1933’s “The Air Race”, were renewed between 1961 — 1962. Commonwealth Pictures owned the rights to the cartoons, eventually handing them to Blackhawk Films and Film Preservation Associates.

== See also ==
- Golden Age of American animation
