= The Good Scout =

1934 film by Ub Iwerks

- Directed by: Ub Iwerks
- Produced by: Ub Iwerks
- Music by: Carl Stalling; Art Turkisher
- Animation by: Robt. G. Stokes; Norm Blackburn
- Color process: Black-and-white
- Production company: Animated Pictures
- Distributed by: Metro-Goldwyn-Mayer
- Release date: 1934
- Running time: 7 min.
- Country: United States
- Language: English

The Good Scout is an American animated short film directed by Ub Iwerks and featuring Willie Whopper. It has a copyright date of September 1, 1934. It is known for being the first Metro-Goldwyn-Mayer film in which Bosko makes an appearance.

== Summary ==
At Boy Scout Headquarters, a troop leader blows a bugle call summoning his charges to discuss their daily good turns. The boys line up, Willie's turn coming after his Cantonese- and Yiddish-speaking comrades deliver their incomprehensible tales. Willie narrates his derring-do:

Clad in a sailor suit, young Willie saves a dog from a cruel prank by severing some tin cans that have been tied to his tail by a string; several other dogs with the same problem follow at the first's direction, but Willie must dash off to help a poor waif whose newspapers have been stolen by a bruiser in a beret. Willie steps between the two and commands the bully to let the lad alone. The big fellow cries after Willie punches him in the face and takes back the papers, but the scrawny victim, now sympathizing with his old tormentor, punches Willie into the street and walks off hand-in-hand with the battered brute.

A lady in a white gown cautiously foots a mud puddle as she considers crossing the street; Willie chivalrously lays his jacket over the puddle for the lady, but as she steps down she is instantly engulfed in mud as if by the sea. An incredulous Willie helps the lady out of the mess, and she, brandishing her umbrella, chases him off, Willie grasping the spare tire on the back of a speeding car to get away. Posters advertising a $5,000 reward for the return of the kidnapped Mary fly into the air as the careless driver plows into a trash can abandoned by a street cleaner who flees the car by diving down the sewer. Mary is tied up in the back of the car, and Willie, having looked over the poster and begged silent confirmation from the damsel of her identity, attempts to board the vehicle, but as he tries to step onto the spare tire, it detaches from the car and leaves the scout flailing atop the rubber as it rolls rapidly down the road after the perpetrator & his prey (and over the face of an old man who emerges from another sewer grate!) The villain pulls up to an apartment building and enters with Mary in his arms; Willie tries to steer his wheel, but loses control as it crashes into and bursts a fire hydrant, whose consequent surge shoots Willie up some dozen flights to the flagpole on the building's roof. Willie hangs on for dear life as the pole inclines over the precipice; now it bends down, down, and Willie grasps the pole's rope, which descends just so that he can see within the apartment where the evildoer terrorizes the young lady. Willie, kicking off from the windowsill, swings away and swings back again, kicking the cur away from the girl. Mary rescues Willie from a fall, and he storms in furiously to finish his business. Charging Willie grasps a hanging lamp, and swings again feet forward at his foe, who dazed but an instant lunges at Willie just as the boy-pendulum reaches too high for the villain's grasp, which is now perforce for the open window and Willie's perilous rope. Our hero works the pulley such that the defeated dastard must dangle from the roof! Willie and Mary eye each other amorously as the scout ends his tale, and the scout master gives Willie a medal for his fantastic lie.

== Cameo by Bosko ==
As Willie waits on line to speak to the scout master, Bosko, the trademark character of Harman and Ising, waits behind him. Steve Stanchfield explains this as an anticipation of that duo's 1934 replacement of the Iwerks Studio as MGM's cartoon producer.
