= Little Black Sambo (film) =

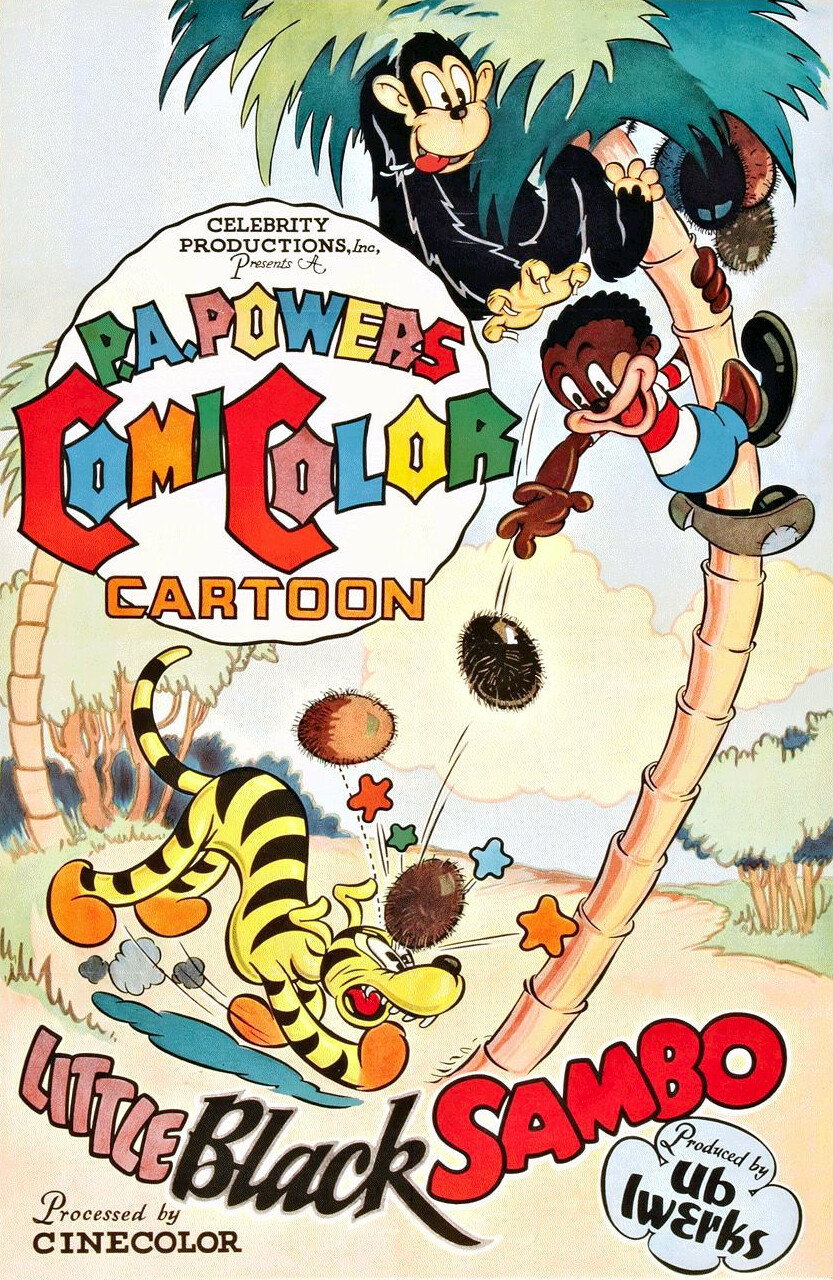
- Poster
- Directed by: Ub Iwerks
- Produced by: Ub Iwerks
- Starring: Possibly Ub Iwerks
- Music by: Carl Stalling
- Animation by: Ub Iwerks
- Color process: Cinecolor
- Production company: Animated Pictures
- Distributed by: Celebrity Productions
- Release date: February 6, 1935
- Running time: 8 minutes
- Country: United States
- Language: English

The Cartoon

Little Black Sambo is a 1935 Cinecolor animated film with sound. Released on February 6, 1935, the short is based on the 1899 children's book The Story of Little Black Sambo by Helen Bannerman. This film was created at Ub Iwerks's Animated Pictures and released by Celebrity Productions. The film marked the first appearance of an unnamed dog who appeared in three of Iwerks' films.

== Plot ==
Sambo's mother is bathing him, and she dries and clothes him as their dog watches. After that, his mother warns, in dialect, "Now, go along and play, honey child. But watch out for that bad, old tiger." and the controversial line, "That old tiger sure do like dark meat". As Sambo goes out to play, the dog sneaks out the window with a fiendish idea. He uses undried brown paint on a fence for stripes and a paint brush for them on his tail. He sees his teeth, and finds a bear trap to resemble sharp teeth. He tests his appearance in a mirror and walks away, although it was an actual tiger.

Sambo is whistling, as the dog is hiding in a tree, sneaking on him. The dog follows him, until Sambo runs away. He finally hides on a coconut tree, and throws coconuts at him, until he grabs a monkey's ear, who throws him out to the ground. Then, the dog tells Sambo that he is not a tiger. Then, Sambo plays fetch, and when the dog retrieves, the real tiger appears, and chases them home. They block the door, and the tiger uses a rock to reproduce a banging sound. He creeps in the house, and they use molasses to trap him. Sambo grabs a skillet and burns the tiger, and he is chased away.

== Reception ==
The Film Daily (April 25, 1935): "The tale of a pickaninny's adventures as he wanders off into the jungle with his faithful pup. They encounter a ferocious tiger, who gives chase, and they escape to the shelter of the cabin. The tiger breaks in, but the pickaninny and the pup pull a fast one, and get rid of him. Done with a swell comedy technique by Iwerks, and the color treatment is very good".

Philadelphia Exhibitor (May 1, 1935): "Swell color; swell drawing; satisfactory comedy, music not too good. All about Little Sambo, mother warning him against the big bad tiger, family dog overhearing, deciding to play tiger, notion of them receiving scare from real tiger. Pleasant".

== Home media ==
The film was available for purchase for home viewing from 1942 to 1968 from Castle Films, the company having acquired the rights for it among the many acquired from the defunct Ub Iwerks Studio in 1941. It was listed as #757 in its catalog in 1948 in various formats, including 8mm and 16mm, in color and in black-and-white, condensed to 3:30 minutes or full-length, with sound or silent with minimal dialog on interstitial cards.

It was released on video and DVD on several public domain cartoon anthologies, including Johnny Legend Presents: The Complete Weird Cartoons. The Castle Films color/sound version has been digitized and is available as part of the collection at the Internet Archive, mislabeled there as Loittle Black Sambo.

== In popular culture ==
Alongside clips from Scrub Me Mama with a Boogie Beat, clips of the cartoon are seen in the 2000 film Bamboozled, a Spike Lee film about black stereotypes.

Various parts of the cartoon can be seen in the opening credits of the 2007 independent film Spinning Into Butter, starring Sarah Jessica Parker and Victor Rasuk, as well as on the music video for "On Top of Your World" by Sahara Hotnights.
