= Fiddlesticks (1930 film) =

1930 film by Ub Iwerks

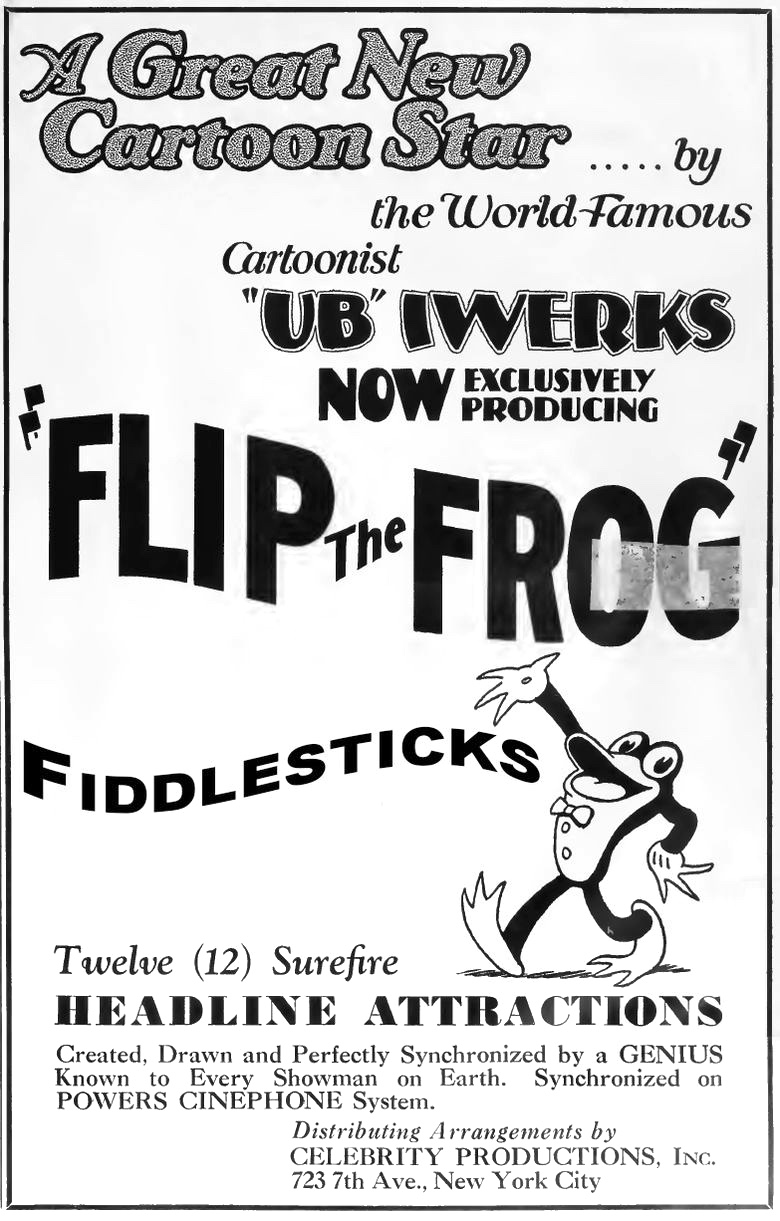
- Directed by: Ub Iwerks
- Produced by: Ub Iwerks
- Music by: Carl Stalling
- Animation by: Ub Iwerks; Fred Kopietz; Jim Pabian
- Backgrounds by: Fred Kopietz
- Color process: Harriscolor
- Production company: Animated Pictures
- Distributed by: Celebrity Pictures
- Release date: August 16, 1930
- Running time: 6:12
- Country: United States
- Language: Sound film (no dialogue)

Fiddlesticks is a 1930 American animated comedy short film directed and animated by Ub Iwerks, in his first cartoon since he departed from Walt Disney's studio. The short features Iwerks' character Flip the Frog.

The short is the first complete, individual sound cartoon to be photographed in color, using the short-lived Harriscolor process. Fiddlesticks was released a few months after King of Jazz, a musical revue from Universal Pictures which included a two-strip Technicolor cartoon segment, animated by Walter Lantz & Bill Nolan of the Universal cartoon studio, featuring a caricature of the film's star Paul Whiteman (and a cameo by Iwerks creation Oswald the Lucky Rabbit).

The copyright of the film was renewed in 1959, one of the few Flip cartoons to have their copyright renewed. It entered the public domain on January 1, 2026 as a work from 1930.

== Plot synopsis ==
The full short

Flip is seen dancing on lilypads until he reaches land and dries himself off. He walks to a party, where he performs a dance for the audience, accidentally climbing to a spider web. He also performs a duet, playing piano alongside a mouse playing the violin. They perform two songs. In the first song, the mouse starts crying, and so do Flip and the piano. The second song makes Flip start hugging the piano, which then kicks Flip. The cartoon ends with Flip beating on the piano; he kicks all the piano keys into the air, and they drop onto him.

== Significance ==
Fiddlesticks was the first in the Flip the Frog series. The sound system was Powers Cinephone, the same system used for Disney's Mickey Mouse shorts starting with Steamboat Willie in 1928 up to 1932, which Ub Iwerks previously worked on from 1928 to 1929.

The unnamed mouse in the cartoon bears a striking resemblance to Mortimer Mouse, the original concept behind Mickey Mouse, both of whom were first animated by Ub Iwerks.

== In popular culture ==
The cartoon appeared on a television set in the music video for Eminem's song "The Real Slim Shady", which a viewer laughs at.
