= Golden Yeggs =

1950 film by Friz Freleng

- Title card
- Directed by: I. Freleng
- Story by: Tedd Pierce
- Starring: Mel Blanc
- Music by: Carl Stalling
- Animation by: Arthur Davis; Gerry Chiniquy; Ken Champin; Virgil Ross; Emery Hawkins
- Layouts by: Hawley Pratt
- Backgrounds by: Paul Julian
- Color process: Technicolor
- Production company: Warner Bros. Cartoons
- Distributed by: Warner Bros. Pictures<brr />The Vitaphone Corporation
- Release date: August 5, 1950
- Running time: 6:51
- Language: English

Golden Yeggs is a 1950 Warner Bros. Merrie Melodies short directed by Friz Freleng. The cartoon was released on August 5, 1950, and stars Daffy Duck and Porky Pig. A forerunner of the Rocky and Mugsy characters appear, with Rocky already in his present-day form.

The story was written by Tedd Pierce and animated by Arthur Davis, Gerry Chiniquy, Ken Champin, Virgil Ross and Emery Hawkins. Paul Julian painted the backgrounds and Hawley Pratt designed the layouts. Mel Blanc provided the voices and Carl W. Stalling the music.

"Yegg" is a slang term for a burglar or safecracker. The same play-on-words was used in the title of the 1947 Bugs Bunny cartoon, Easter Yeggs. It is also a film noir parody.

== Plot ==
When Porky finds a golden egg in his henhouse, a goose reveals to the audience that he laid it. However, knowing full well what happened to the goose that laid the golden egg (a reference to Aesop's Fables), the goose tells Porky that Daffy is responsible. After reading about how much Daffy is worth, Rocky and his gang strong-arm Porky and 'talk him into' selling the duck to them. They hustle Daffy back to their den where Rocky demands he lay a golden egg. Daffy tries to stall for time, at one point asking for surroundings that would make him more comfortable. Rocky and his henchmen oblige, but when Daffy tries to get out of providing the egg, they shoot him out of the nice pool he has been enjoying and take him back to their hideout.

Daffy is given five minutes to lay the egg, or else. The duck insists on privacy, then tries various ways to escape his predicament, but is stopped at every turn. When time runs out, Rocky fires his gun at Daffy's head (but due to cartoon logic, Daffy does not die). The extreme stress results in him actually laying a golden egg, unless it was a fake or that goose put it there.

Relieved he is now free to go, Daffy prances toward the door. Rocky holds him up, points into a room containing dozens of empty egg crates and orders the duck to fill them. Daffy groans, "Oh, my achin' back" and faints.

=== Alternative ending ===
In the context of its inclusion in The Looney Looney Looney Bugs Bunny Movie, an alternate denouement is presented for this cartoon. Departing from the original conclusion where Daffy Duck succumbs to exhaustion, a new resolution unfolds as Bugs Bunny, assuming the guise of Elegant Mess (a satirical reference to Eliot Ness), arrives on the scene accompanied by law enforcement officers to apprehend Rocky and his cohorts.

Daffy, fatigued from executing Rocky's commands, is depicted as being taken away on a stretcher to receive medical attention. Bugs, demonstrating concern for Daffy's well-being, inquires if he requires any assistance, to which Daffy humorously requests immediate attention from a proctologist.

== Home media ==
This cartoon is available on the Looney Tunes Golden Collection: Volume 1, Disc 2.
