= Porky's Badtime Story =

1937 film by Robert Clampett

- Directed by: Robert Clampett
- Produced by: Leon Schlesinger
- Music by: Carl W. Stalling
- Animation by: Charles Jones; Jerry Hatchcock (uncredited)
- Color process: Black-and-white
- Production company: Leon Schlesinger Productions
- Distributed by: Warner Bros. Productions; The Vitaphone Corporation
- Release date: July 24, 1937
- Running time: 7 min
- Country: United States
- Language: English

Porky's Badtime Story is a 1937 American animated comedy short film directed by Robert Clampett. It was released on July 24, 1937. It is the 88th film in the Looney Tunes series, the 26th cartoon to feature Porky Pig, the second film to feature Gabby Goat and the first to be directed by Clampett. The short was later remade by Clampett as Tick Tock Tuckered (1944), with Daffy Duck taking Gabby's role.

== Plot ==
Porky Pig and Gabby Goat miss their alarm at 6 a.m. and oversleep to 10 a.m. They frantically rush to work at Peter Piper Pickled Peppers. When clocking in, Gabby tries to pull the lever, but ends up struggling and sounding an alarm. Their boss initially sarcastically reminds them, but threatens to fire them if they arrive late one more time.

To Gabby's chagrin, Porky makes him sleep at 8 p.m. to avoid waking up late. As they sleep, three cats meow offscreen, causing Porky to throw a shoe at them; they return the shoe and hit Porky in the head multiple times. A fly pesters Porky and lands on Gabby's head, waking him up. The moon attempts to shine on Porky, causing him to close the curtains multiple times, only for the moon to forcibly open one curtain. Porky ties the curtain to his bed, but the moon tugs the bed and removes the bed springs, causing him to collapse into the bed.

Porky sleeps on Gabby's bed. A leak in the roof disturbs Gabby, who then opens an umbrella in the house with Porky telling him that it's bad luck. Gabby ignores Porky's statement until lightning destroys the umbrella. When Gabby quips that he should try sleeping under Niagara Falls, a lot of water comes through the roof and down on them. Porky and Gabby then sleep in some drawers without issue. They wake up the next morning and rush to work on time, but realize that it is a Sunday and they do not need to work. They rush home and catch up on sleep, with Porky hitting the alarm clock after its second alarm.

== Production ==
Clampett, Jones, and Robert Cannon had been loaned out to Ub Iwerks' studio, Animated Pictures Corp., after Leon Schlesinger began subcontracting Looney Tunes shorts to the studio. Both Clampett and Jones resented the assignment - both had directorial aspirations, and both had hoped to be promoted by Schlesinger to serve as director and head of his own unit at Schlesinger, while Jones was previously hired by Iwerks as a cel washer.

Work on the Iwerks Looney Tunes had been slow and difficult - Iwerks disliked the Porky Pig character, and he and his staff had to be coached by Clampett, Jones, and Cannon on how to execute the irreverent Looney Tunes tone and style. Clampett would later recall that Iwerks' "heart just wan't in it," and he reported to work one Monday morning in April 1937 to find that Iwerks did not report to work - and that he was expected to complete direction of the cartoon. Clampett had Jones complete Iwerks' unfinished layout drawings, and supervised the completion of the Schlesinger and Iwerks staff animators' work on both the original scenes and reshoots Clampett would later request.

The original intended title of the short was It Happened All Night, a pun on the name of the popular 1934 Clark Gable-Claudette Colbert feature film It Happened One Night. While a title card with that name was produced, It Happened All Night was thought to be too suggestive and the short was retitled as Porky's Badtime Story. One of Iwerks' animators, Jerry Hatchcock, was lead animator on the film with Jones; for unknown reasons, he was not credited in the final film, though he used the opportunity to move to Warner Bros. with fellow Iwerks animator Bill Hammer after its release.

Clampett, with assistance from Jones on layouts, would finish one more Porky cartoon, Get Rich Quick Porky, before the Schlesinger artists would return to the Sunset Boulevard lot and Clampett would be assigned his own unit – actually run as a separate corporation under Schlesinger's brother-in-law Ray Katz. Under Katz, Clampett would direct Rover's Rival without any involvement with Iwerks, which would be released later in 1937.

== Home media ==
Porky's Badtime Story is available on disc 2 of the Porky Pig 101 DVD set.

== Legacy ==
Bob Clampett later directed a remake of the short as Tick Tock Tuckered (1944), with Daffy Duck taking Gabby's role.

== See also ==
- Porky Pig filmography
- Looney Tunes and Merrie Melodies filmography (1930–1939)
