= Catty Cornered =

1953 film

- A still from the short
- Directed by: I. Freleng
- Story by: Warren Foster
- Starring: Mel Blanc
- Narrated by: Ralph James (uncredited)
- Music by: Carl Stalling
- Animation by: Arthur Davis; Manuel Perez; Ken Champin; Virgil Ross
- Layouts by: Hawley Pratt
- Backgrounds by: Irv Wyner
- Color process: Technicolor
- Production company: Warner Bros. Cartoons
- Distributed by: Warner Bros. Pictures; The Vitaphone Corporation
- Release date: October 31, 1953
- Running time: 7 minutes
- Language: English

Catty Cornered is a 1953 Warner Bros. Merrie Melodies cartoon directed by Friz Freleng. The short was released on October 31, 1953, and stars Tweety and Sylvester. It features a forerunner of the Rocky and Mugsy duo.

== Plot ==
Tweety, who is a rare and valuable bird, has been captured and held for ransom by a duo of criminals: Rocky and his assistant Nick. Sylvester, who is interested only in finding food to eat, makes a number of attempts to steal Tweety:

- Sylvester climbs up the fire escape, then edges along a ledge to the apartment. Rocky sees him and places a banana peel on the ledge, causing Sylvester to slip and fall off.
- Sylvester climbs up the main stairs. Tweety escapes and meets Sylvester on the landing. Tweety refuses Sylvester's offer to use his mouth as a hiding place (the cat tried to eat him; "Not so hard!"). Sylvester instead hides Tweety under a can just as the criminals arrive. Nick takes Sylvester inside for searching, while Rocky removes Tweety from under the can and replaces the bird with a firecracker. Sylvester escapes with the can, unaware of the firecracker, and is injured when it explodes.
- Sylvester hoists himself up using a pulley on a building site. He grabs Tweety and escapes, but the steel plate on the end of the pulley falls back down and lands on him.

Sylvester then gains access using a dumbwaiter. At the same time, police surround the building. Nick hides Tweety in the dumbwaiter, unaware that Sylvester is in there. Rocky is arrested (and likely Nick too). Sylvester escapes from the apartment block with Tweety and is quickly hailed as a hero by the press, who are unaware that he was only interested in eating the bird. Sylvester is forced to attend a celebration in which the mayor requests Sylvester to kiss Tweety, but he eats him instead, only for the mayor to slap between Sylvester's back and neck, forcing Tweety to land back onstage. Tweety ended the cartoon with "Oooh, he's a bad putty tat!"

== Cast ==
- Mel Blanc as Tweety, Sylvester, Rocky, Nick, Paperboy, News Reporter, Police Officer, Photographer and Mayor
- Ralph James as Narrator
