= Porky and Gabby =

1937 film by Ub Iwerks

- Title card
- Directed by: Ub Iwerks
- Produced by: Leon Schlesinger
- Starring: Mel Blanc
- Music by: Carl W. Stalling
- Animation by: Charles Jones; Bob Clampett
- Color process: Black-and-white
- Production company: Leon Schlesinger Productions
- Distributed by: Warner Bros. Productions; The Vitaphone Corporation
- Release date: May 15, 1937
- Running time: 7 min
- Country: United States
- Language: English

Porky and Gabby is a 1937 American animated comedy short film directed by Ub Iwerks. The short was released on May 15, 1937. It is the 85th film in the Looney Tunes series, the 23rd cartoon to feature Porky Pig and the first to feature Gabby Goat.

The cartoon was the first of four cartoons for which animation production was subcontracted by Leon Schlesinger to Ub Iwerks' Animated Pictures studio. When production fell behind, Bob Clampett, Chuck Jones, and Robert Cannon temporarily joined the Iwerks staff to help with the animation. Iwerks was reunited with his former employees, Jones and Carl W. Stalling, on the film. Clampett redesigned Porky for the film to his current familiar self.

== Plot ==
Gabby Goat begrudgingly goes on a camping trip with Porky Pig, only for their belongings to be launched by a boulder and land on Gabby. Gabby then provokes a truck driver, who calmly handles his temperament and dumps him into a mud pool. Their car breaks down on a valley, so they push the car, only for it to speed down the valley and reverse at the same speed on the slope. The engine is then fixed while Porky and Gabby land in the car.

Porky Pig arrives at the destination and sets up a tent, only to be troubled by a fly. Gabby chases it with a shovel, only to fail to squash it as it flies onto the car, causing Gabby to smash the engine out of the car. As Porky requests that Gabby retrieve a piece of rope, the rope he finds triggers a motor which flies like a helicopter, shreds the tent into pieces, digs a hole and punts Gabby into it. Gabby tries to shoot it with a shotgun, but is repeatedly launched into a car horn. A mattress' spring sends Gabby into a tree branch. Porky uses a lasso to catch it, but is dragged into its flight. Two trees Gabby are on are turned into unwieldy stilts. As they narrowly avoid the motor again, they drive away and meet the truck from earlier, who is blown to pieces with the car by the motor. Gabby mocks the driver, only to be slapped again.

== Home media ==
Porky and Gabby is available on disc 2 of the Porky Pig 101 DVD set.

== See also ==
- Porky Pig filmography
- Looney Tunes and Merrie Melodies filmography (1930–1939)
