= The Headless Horseman (1934 film) =

- Directed by: Ub Iwerks
- Based on: The Headless Horseman
- Produced by: Ub Iwerks
- Distributed by: Celebrity Productions
- Release date: 1934
- Country: United States
- Language: English

The Headless Horseman is a 1934 animated short film directed by Ub Iwerks and part of the ComiColor cartoon series. It is based on the 1820 short story "The Legend of Sleepy Hollow" by Washington Irving.

The film was the first time Iwerks used the technique multiplane animation, his most prestigious invention. This allowed for a three-dimensional look, separating layers of the background.

== Plot ==
Katrina Van Tassel is courted by both Brom Bones and Ichabod Crane, both of whom express a dislike for the other. Ichabod reads of the legend of the Headless Horseman and is startled when a courier arrives to deliver a message. Ichabod is invited to a brawl at Van Tassel Hall. The suitors feed Katrina and kiss her arms, and in the confusion end up kissing each other. Three musicians play music and the guests dance. Brom dances with Katrina, but stumbles on his feet. Ichabod cuts in and dances more smoothly. Ichabod shows off with tap dancing, which impresses Katrina but infuriates Brom who imagines Ichabod as a rattlesnake, a stinking skunk, and a donkey.

When the guests are gathered around the fireplace, an old man tells the legend of the Headless Horseman, scaring the party but giving Brom an idea. At midnight, the guests leave. When Ichabod makes advances on Katrina, she kicks him out. On his way home, he is chased and scared off by what appears to be a headless horseman, but is later revealed to be Brom.

Brom and Katrina are wed, but after Brom has placed the ring on Katrina's finger, a headless figure appears and scares off the wedding guests, the priest, and the newlyweds. It appears the headless figure is Ichabod.
