= Cal Howard =

American screenwriter and director (1911–1993)

Calvin Henry Howard (March 24, 1911 – September 10, 1993) was an American cartoon story artist, animator and director mostly remembered for his work at Walter Lantz Productions and Warner Bros. Cartoons. He was also the voice actor of Gabby Goat in Get Rich Quick Porky and Meathead Dog in Screwball Squirrel.

== Career ==
In the late 1920s, Howard became a story man and animator for Walter Lantz Productions, then Walt Disney Productions in 1929. He became well-acquainted with Disney's right hand man Ub Iwerks, departing with him to the Iwerks Studio in the process. From 1930 to 1933, Howard served as a story man for Iwerks and then Lantz, before moving to Leon Schlesinger Productions which he had been affiliated with through collaborations with Iwerks. In 1937, after Friz Freleng left Schlesinger for MGM, Frank Tashlin took over Freleng's old unit, while Howard and animator Cal Dalton took over Tashlin's old unit.

In 1938, Howard left Leon Schlesinger Productions with his friend Tedd Pierce to work for Fleischer Studios in Miami, and served as the live-action model for Prince David in Fleischer's Gulliver's Travels. Subsequently, Ben Hardaway took over Howard as Dalton's co-director. In the 1940s, Howard left Fleischer for the Metro-Goldwyn-Mayer cartoon department in 1940, where he served as an uncredited writer for Tom and Jerry. He was fired by producer Fred Quimby, after discovering that he brought alcohol to the ink and paint department during Christmas holidays. Howard would move to Screen Gems in 1945, and later returned to Warner Bros. Cartoons in 1949.

In 1974, Howard returned to Disney as a story artist. In 1949, Cal Howard moved from California to New York City, to work on NBC's Broadway Open House and Your Show of Shows. When Broadway Open House ended he was hired by Pat Weaver to be an associate producer and writer for the development of NBC's Today Show. He left NBC early in 1952 to return to California and work with Ralph Edwards. In the 1960s, he returned to cartoon work, until his retirement. Cal Howard worked at over seven animation studios in his lifetime and finally received the Annie Award in 1980 for lifetime achievement. He also served on the advisory board of the National Student Film Institute.
