= Porky's Super Service =

1937 film by Ub Iwerks

- Title card
- Directed by: Ub Iwerks
- Produced by: Leon Schlesinger
- Starring: Mel Blanc; Joe Twerp; Elvia Allman
- Music by: Carl W. Stalling
- Animation by: Charles Jones; Robert Clampett
- Production company: Leon Schlesinger Productions
- Distributed by: Warner Bros. Productions; The Vitaphone Corporation
- Release date: July 3, 1937
- Running time: 7 minutes
- Country: United States
- Language: English

Porky's Super Service is a 1937 American animated comedy short film directed by Ub Iwerks. It was released on July 3, 1937. It is the 87th film in the Looney Tunes series and the 25th cartoon to feature Porky Pig.

The cartoon was the second of four cartoons for which animation production was subcontracted by Leon Schlesinger to Ub Iwerks' Animated Pictures Corp. studio, and the final to be fully directed by Iwerks. Schlesinger animators Bob Clampett and Chuck Jones, on loan-out to Iwerks, completed supervision of the final two cartoons themselves.

== Plot ==
Porky Pig operates a gas station. He helps anthropomorphic animals refuel their gas tanks and oil their engines. One car has a bump which magically reappears every time Porky hits it until it escapes to the windshield, which shatters upon impact.

Porky helps a female dog inflate her car's tires, but accidentally distracts her sleeping baby despite being told not to do so. The baby hits his head and sends him flying to a pole, trapping him in a tire. As he oils the car's engine, the baby slams his head in the car. Porky then uses a stethoscope to test the engine, only to be electrocuted and honked at when the baby starts the engine, then thrown into the engine and expelled through the exhaustion pipe.

Porky notices the baby's antics, only to have his nose trapped in the window, while the baby inflates him with air and shoots him with gasoline. The baby accidentally shoots itself with gasoline and blames it on Porky. The mother is dissatisfied with both the baby and Porky (despite seemingly tolerating the former), as she drives away, unaware that her baby has tied a pipe to their tire, destroying the entire gas station as Porky is hit by the sign.

== Home media ==
The short film was released on the Kid Galahad DVD, along with two other Warner Bros. cartoons Egghead Rides Again and I Wanna Be a Sailor. It is also available on the five-disc Porky Pig 101 DVD set.

== See also ==
- Porky Pig filmography
- Looney Tunes and Merrie Melodies filmography (1930–1939)
