= List of Looney Tunes and Merrie Melodies characters =

The Looney Tunes and Merrie Melodies series of animated shorts released by Warner Bros. feature a range of characters which are listed and briefly detailed here. Major characters from the franchise include Bugs Bunny, Daffy Duck, Elmer Fudd, Foghorn Leghorn, Granny, Marvin the Martian, Pepé Le Pew, Porky Pig, Speedy Gonzales, Sylvester the Cat, the Tasmanian Devil, Tweety, Wile E. Coyote and the Road Runner, Yosemite Sam. This list does not include characters from Looney Tunes-related television series, like Tiny Toon Adventures characters, Animaniacs characters, or Duck Dodgers characters, as they have their own list.

== Character table ==
The following is a list of characters who are in at least 2 different types of "Looney Tunes" media, not including cameos.

Character(s)	Theatrical shorts	Feature films (Note: Not including compilation films)	Television series	Other media
Angus MacRory	Yes	No	Yes	Yes
Barnyard Dawg	Yes	Yes	Yes	Yes
Beaky Buzzard	Yes	Yes	Yes	Yes
Bosko	Yes	No	Yes	Yes
Buddy	Yes	No	Yes	No
Bugs Bunny	Yes	Yes	Yes	Yes
Bunny & Claude	Yes	No	No	Yes
Blacque Jacque Shellacque	Yes	No	Yes	Yes
Dr. Lorre	Yes	Yes	No	No
Cecil Turtle	Yes	Yes	Yes	Yes
Charlie Dog	Yes	Yes	Yes	Yes
Claude Cat	Yes	Yes	Yes	No
Colonel Rimfire	Yes	Yes	Yes	No
Colonel Shuffle	Yes	No	Yes	No
Cool Cat	Yes	Yes	Yes	Yes
Daffy Duck	Yes	Yes	Yes	Yes
Elmer Fudd	Yes	Yes	Yes	Yes
Foghorn Leghorn	Yes	Yes	Yes	Yes
Foxy	Yes	No	Yes	No
Gabby Goat	Yes	No	Yes	No
Goofy Gophers	Yes	Yes	Yes	No
Gossamer	Yes	Yes	Yes	Yes
Granny	Yes	Yes	Yes	Yes
Hatta Mari	Yes	No	No	No
Hector the Bulldog	Yes	No	Yes	No
Henery Hawk	Yes	No	Yes	Yes
Hubie and Bertie	Yes	Yes	Yes	Yes
Hugo the Abominable Snowman	Yes	Yes	Yes	Yes
K-9	Yes	Yes	Yes	Yes
Lola Bunny	Yes	Yes	Yes	Yes
Marc Antony and Pussyfoot	Yes	Yes	Yes	Yes
Marvin the Martian	Yes	Yes	Yes	Yes
Melissa Duck	Yes	No	Yes	Yes
Merlin the Magic Mouse	Yes	No	Yes	Yes
Michigan J. Frog	Yes	Yes	Yes	Yes
Miss Prissy	Yes	Yes	Yes	Yes
Nasty Canasta	Yes	Yes	Yes	Yes
Penelope Pussycat	Yes	Yes	Yes	No
Pepé Le Pew	Yes	Yes	Yes	Yes
Pete Puma	Yes	Yes	Yes	No
Petunia Pig	Yes	Yes	Yes	Yes
Piggy	Yes	No	Yes	No
Playboy Penguin	Yes	Yes	Yes	Yes
Porky Pig	Yes	Yes	Yes	Yes
Ralph Wolf and Sam Sheepdog	Yes	Yes	Yes	Yes
Rocky and Mugsy	Yes	Yes	Yes	Yes
Slowpoke Rodriguez	Yes	Yes	Yes	Yes
Sniffles	Yes	Yes	Yes	Yes
Speedy Gonzales	Yes	Yes	Yes	Yes
Spike the Bulldog and Chester the Terrier	Yes	Yes	Yes	Yes
Sylvester the Cat	Yes	Yes	Yes	Yes
Tasmanian Devil	Yes	Yes	Yes	Yes
The Three Bears	Yes	Yes	Yes	Yes
Tweety	Yes	Yes	Yes	Yes
Wile E. Coyote and the Road Runner	Yes	Yes	Yes	Yes
Witch Hazel	Yes	Yes	Yes	Yes
Yosemite Sam	Yes	Yes	Yes	Yes

== Recurring minor characters ==
The following is a list of recurring Looney Tunes and Merrie Melodies characters without their own article:

=== Blacque Jacque Shellacque ===
Blacque Jacque Shellacque
- Looney Tunes/Merrie Melodies character
- First appearance: Bonanza Bunny (1959)
- Created by: Robert McKimson and Tedd Pierce
- Voiced by: Mel Blanc (1959–1962); Billy West (1999); Maurice LaMarche (2003–2013); Jim Cummings (2017–2020); Eric Bauza (2023)

In-universe information
- Species: Human
- Gender: Male
- Family: Yosemite Sam (Cousin)
- Nationality: Canadian

Blacque Jacque Shellacque is a fictional cartoon character in the Looney Tunes and Merrie Melodies series cartoons. He was created by Robert McKimson and Tedd Pierce, and first appeared in the 1959 Merrie Melodies short Bonanza Bunny set in the Klondike of 1896. Maurice LaMarche voiced the character from 2011 to 2014 in The Looney Tunes Show. The character was the inspiration for a specific version of five card draw poker mixed with blackjack named "Blacque Jacque Shellacque" in which the pot is divided between the winning poker hand and the winning blackjack hand. If everyone loses in blackjack, the winning poker hand takes all.

While similar in many ways to Yosemite Sam—both are short in stature and temper—Blacque Jacque possesses his own unique characteristics, not the least of which is his comically thick French Canadian accent, performed by Mel Blanc. Also, like Yosemite Sam and many other villains, Blacque Jacque Shellacque does not have a high level of intelligence, preferring to use force instead of strategy to fight Bugs. His usual swear word is Sacrebleu; and he is often portrayed as a thief.

=== Bunny and Claude ===
Bunny and Claude
- Looney Tunes/Merrie Melodies character
- First appearance: Bunny and Claude: We Rob Carrot Patches, 1968
- Created by: Robert McKimson
- Voiced by: Mel Blanc (Claude); Pat Woodell (Bunny)

In-universe information
- Family: Buster Bunny (nephew; Tiny Toons Looniversity); Babs Bunny (niece; Tiny Toons Looniversity)

Bunny and Claude are two fictional cartoon characters in the Looney Tunes and Merrie Melodies series by Warner Bros. Cartoons which debuted in 1968. They are based on the real-life Bonnie and Clyde and the then-recent film about the pair's life that had been released by Warner Bros. Pictures.

They are depicted as a romantically involved pair of well-dressed rabbits who pull off carrot heists, and their catchphrase is "We rob carrot patches", based on the film Bonnie and Clyde's "We rob banks". Bunny was voiced by Pat Woodell and Claude was voiced by veteran Looney Tunes voice actor Mel Blanc. They both speak with pronounced Southern accents. Bunny and Claude are pursued by a stereotypical Southern sheriff (also voiced by Blanc in a fashion similar to his other characters, Foghorn Leghorn and Yosemite Sam).

They appeared in two cartoons produced by Warner Bros.-Seven Arts Animation, Bunny and Claude (We Rob Carrot Patches), released in 1968, and The Great Carrot Train Robbery, released in 1969. Both films were directed by Robert McKimson, and were his first two cartoons he directed in his comeback to Termite Terrace.

A picture of Bunny and Claude is shown in the first Tiny Toons Looniversity special "Spring Beak", in which they are revealed to be Buster and Babs Bunny's aunt and uncle.

=== Colonel Shuffle ===
Colonel Shuffle
- Looney Tunes/Merrie Melodies character
- First appearance: Mississippi Hare (1949)
- Created by: Chuck Jones
- Voiced by: Billy Bletcher (1949); Mel Blanc (1950); Peter Renaday (1995)

In-universe information
- Species: Human

Colonel Shuffle is a stereotypical "gentleman" of the Southern United States. He has been shown as fiercely loyal to this region and deeply offended by anything that he feels reminds him of the Northern United States.

==== Appearances in theatrical shorts ====
He referred to himself specifically by name in Mississippi Hare (1949), following a game of poker in which he lost (three queens to four kings) and proceeded to let off a barrage of gunfire. Sometimes, he is shown playing a banjo in classic Dixieland style.

In Dog Gone South (1950), Colonel Shuffle had an encounter with Charlie Dog (whom he defeated).

==== Later appearances ====
A Colonel Shuffle-lookalike appears in the Tiny Toon Adventures episodes "Gang Busters" and "Fairy Tales for the 90's", voiced by Joe Alaskey and Frank Welker. In the first he's a prison warden of the prison in which Bugs Bunny and Daffy Duck are incarcerated, and in the second he's a toy company CEO who wants to possess ownership on Buster Bunny to market toys in his image.

Shuffle made his last animated appearance in The Sylvester & Tweety Mysteries episode "The Cat Who Knew Too Much", under the name of Colonel Louie Z. Anna, an old rival of Granny's turned villain who tried to kidnap Tweety.

=== Dr. Lorre ===
Dr. Lorre
- Looney Tunes character
- First appearance: Hair-Raising Hare (1946)
- Created by: Chuck Jones
- Voiced by: Mel Blanc (Hair-Raising Hare); Stan Freberg (Birth of a Notion); Billy West (Looney Tunes Back in Action); Eric Bauza (Coyote vs. Acme)

In-universe information
- Species: Human
- Family: Granny (wife; Coyote vs. Acme)

Dr. Lorre is a character depicted as a mad scientist. He is a parody of the actor Peter Lorre.

He first appeared in the short Hair-Raising Hare, where he tries to catch Bugs Bunny with the help of his monster Rudolph. He later appeared in Birth of a Notion, where he orders his dog Leopold to catch Daffy Duck.

He has a minor appearance in the feature film Looney Tunes: Back in Action, where he is a worker at Acme Corporation in charge of torturing Damian Drake.

Dr. Lorre appears as a supporting character in the feature film Coyote vs. Acme. Here, his full name is mentioned as Dr. Peter Lorre. He is also shown as Granny's husband and a former worker at Acme as an inventor of products for Toons.

=== Gabby Goat ===
Gabby Goat
- Looney Tunes character
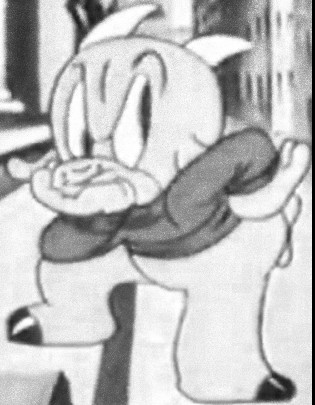
- Gabby Goat in Get Rich Quick Porky (August 1937)
- First appearance: Porky and Gabby; May 15, 1937
- Created by: Ub Iwerks
- Voiced by: Mel Blanc (1937); Cal Howard (Get Rich Quick Porky); Bob Bergen (2018–2019)

In-universe information
- Species: Goat
- Gender: Male
- Family: Granny (Owner)

Gabby Goat is an animated cartoon character in the Warner Bros. Looney Tunes series of cartoons.

Ub Iwerks created Gabby, a loud and temperamental cynic, to be a sidekick for Porky Pig in the 1937 short Porky and Gabby, as Iwerks was briefly subcontracted to Leon Schlesinger Productions, to produce Looney Tunes films. The cartoon focuses on the title characters' camping trip, which is foiled by car trouble.

Gabby made only two other golden-age animated appearances in Porky's Badtime Story and Get Rich Quick Porky (the latter of which did not involve Iwerks), before his retirement.

The series New Looney Tunes revived the character of Gabby.

=== Hector the Bulldog ===
Hector the Bulldog
- Looney Tunes/Merrie Melodies character
- First appearance: Peck Up Your Troubles (1945)
- Created by: Friz Freleng
- Voiced by: Mel Blanc (1947–1983); Frank Welker (1995–2002); Jeff Bergman (2021); Frank Todaro (2022–present)

In-universe information
- Species: Dog (English Bulldog)
- Gender: Male
- Family: Granny (owner); Tweety (owner pet's)
- Nationality: American

Hector the Bulldog is an animated cartoon character in the Warner Bros. Looney Tunes and Merrie Melodies series of cartoons. Hector is a muscle-bound bulldog with gray fur (except in A Street Cat Named Sylvester and Greedy for Tweety, where his fur is yellowish) and walks pigeon-toed. His face bears a perpetual scowl between two immense jowls. He usually wears a black collar with silver studs.

Hector's first appearance was in 1945's Peck Up Your Troubles, where he foils Sylvester's attempts to get a woodpecker. He made a second appearance in A Hare Grows in Manhattan, leading a street gang composed of dogs in a Friz Freleng-directed short; this is also the only short where the dog has numerous speaking lines. Besides these starring roles, Hector is a minor player in several Tweety and Sylvester cartoons directed by Freleng in 1948 and throughout the 1950s. His usual role is to protect Tweety from Sylvester, usually at Granny's request. He typically does this through brute strength alone, but some cartoons have him outsmart the cat, such as 1954's Satan's Waitin', wherein Hector (as Satan) convinces Sylvester to use up his nine lives by pursuing Tweety through a series of extremely dangerous situations. In most of his appearances, the bulldog is nameless, though he is sometimes referred to as Spike, not to be confused with Freleng's other creation Spike who is often paired with Chester the Terrier.

From 1979 to 1983, when Sylvester was the mascot for 9Lives' line of dry cat food, Hector appeared in most TV commercials with the feline, whose plots typically involved Sylvester attempting to distract him to get the bowl of 9Lives, only for the cat to once again end up in danger by the end, with Sylvester proclaiming the brand as "worth riskin' your life for!".

Hector's most prominent role was as a regular cast member in the animated series The Sylvester and Tweety Mysteries. In the cartoon, he plays Granny's loyal guardian. The show makes Hector's low intelligence his Achilles heel as Sylvester is constantly outwitting him.

Hector also appears in the video game Bugs Bunny & Taz: Time Busters where he guards one of the time gears in Granwich. He also appears as an enemy in the game Looney Tunes: Twouble!, in which he can be distracted by giving him a bone.

He is a member of the studio audience in the video game Sheep, Dog 'n' Wolf.

=== Jose and Manuel ===
Jose and Manuel
- Looney Tunes/Merrie Melodies character
- First appearance: Two Crows from Tacos (1956)
- Created by: Friz Freleng
- Voiced by: Don Diamond (1956); Mel Blanc (1959-1966); Tom Holland (1956-1966)

In-universe information
- Species: Crows
- Gender: Male
- Nationality: Mexican

Jose and Manuel are Looney Tunes and Merrie Melodies characters created by Friz Freleng, debuting in the short "Two Crows from Tacos".

=== K-9 ===
K-9
- Looney Tunes character
- First appearance: Haredevil Hare (1948)
- Created by: Chuck Jones
- Voiced by: Mel Blanc (1948); Joe Alaskey (1996); Frank Welker (2003–2004); Fred Tatasciore (2022–present)

In-universe information
- Species: Martian dog
- Gender: Male
- Occupation: Marvin's pet
- Family: Marvin the Martian (owner and boss)
- Nationality: Mars

K-9 is Marvin the Martian's pet alien dog. He is a dog with green fur, and like his owner, he wears a helmet, skirt, and four slippers. K-9 debuts in Haredevil Hare (1948), where he and his owner Marvin tried to defeat Bugs Bunny. He returns in The Hasty Hare (1952), serving the same purpose. After that, he did not appear in another short film until Marvin the Martian in the Third Dimension (1996), where he and Marvin confront Daffy Duck.

In the television series Duck Dodgers, K-9 appears as the pet of Martian Commander X-2 (Marvin's alternate character in the series), having major roles in the episodes "K-9 Kaddy" and "K9 Quarry". He has also had cameo appearances in other Looney Tunes related television series: Marvin and him make a cameo appearance at the end of the episode "What's the Frequency, Kitty?" from The Sylvester & Tweety Mysteries; K-9 appears sleeping next to Marvin and Minerva Mink while they have a date in the episode "Star Warners" from Pinky and the Brain; in The Looney Tunes Show, K-9 has a cameo in the musical video "I'm a Martian" from the episode "Members Only". In Loonatics Unleashed, the character Sergeant Sirius is a robot dog based on him, being the pet of Melvin the Martian, a descendant of Marvin.

K-9 makes a cameo appearance in the film Space Jam, as part of the audience during the basketball game. He has a minor but most notable appearance in the film Space Jam: A New Legacy, where after Bugs claims Tune World in the name of the Earth, he appears alongside Marvin, who arrives to claim Tune World in the name of Mars.

K-9 also appears as a playable character in the mobile game Looney Tunes World of Mayhem.

=== Melissa Duck ===
Melissa Duck
- Looney Tunes/Merrie Melodies character
- First appearance: Nasty Quacks (unofficial) December 1, 1945; The Scarlet Pumpernickel (official) March 4, 1950
- Created by: Frank Tashlin (prototype); Chuck Jones (officially)
- Voiced by: Mel Blanc (1945; prototype); Marian Richman (1950); Janyse Jaud (Baby Looney Tunes; 2002–2005)

In-universe information
- Species: Mallard
- Gender: Female
- Significant other: Daffy Duck

Melissa Duck is a blonde female duck who is the girlfriend to and occasional female counterpart of Daffy Duck. She was created by Frank Tashlin as a prototype and later by Chuck Jones officially, appearing in the short, The Scarlet Pumpernickel, voiced by Marian Richman. A baby version appeared in Baby Looney Tunes as part of the main cast.

==== History ====
In the 1945 cartoon Nasty Quacks, Daffy's owner, a young human girl named Agnes, also becomes the besotted owner of a small, yellow duckling. When a jealous Daffy feeds the duckling growth pills, he is surprised to see it age into a white, female duck with blonde hair. By the end of the cartoon, the two have fallen in love and given birth to roughly ten black, white, and yellow ducklings of their own. The blonde duck in this cartoon bears visual similarities to Daffy's girlfriend from 1953's Muscle Tussle and may represent the "origin" of the Melissa Duck character.

Melissa Duck first officially appeared by name in adult form in the 1950 short The Scarlet Pumpernickel which was, in 1994, voted number 31 of the 50 Greatest Cartoons of all time by members of the animation field. In the cartoon, she appears as a blonde damsel-in-distress and Daffy's love interest. The plot followed Daffy attempting to save "the Fair Lady Melissa" from having to marry the evil Grand Duke Sylvester with whom she is not in love.

Melissa Duck appeared many years later in the series Baby Looney Tunes which debuted in 2002 and casts the adult characters from the original Looney Tunes theatrical shorts as their infant selves, and displays Melissa's crush on Daffy Duck when she was an infant.

In 2021, Melissa Duck reappeared as a playable character in the mobile game Looney Tunes World of Mayhem titled the "Fair Lady Melissa", "Maid Melissa", "Possessed Melissa", "Shapeshifter Melissa", and "Saloon Dancer Melissa".

Similar characters based on and inspired by Melissa had appeared in other productions, also serving as Daffy's love interest; Femme Fatale (aka "The Body", also referred to as Fowl Fatale or Shapely Lady Duck)), appears the 1952 short The Super Snooper. She is a tall voluptuous bright blue-eyed, redheaded duck with red hair and wearing red lipstick and a striking red dress, and she goes madly in love with Daffy as a detective. Later in Robert McKimson's Muscle Tussle (1953), another female duck appears as Daffy's love interest here with him on a visit to the beach. This female duck bears a strong resemblance to Veronica Lake. Another female duck, named Mary appears in the 1957 short Boston Quackie, where she's Daffy's girlfriend on vacation in Paris. Later in the post-Golden Age media, another female duck, named Thelma, who has a human-like form, with golden-blonde hair and wearing a red evening dress appears as a possessed client of Daffy's paranormal investigations business in the short The Duxorcist, originally released as part of Daffy Duck's Quackbusters in 1988. In 2011 The Looney Tunes Show introduced a female duck character, Tina Russo (voiced by Jennifer Esposito in Season 1 and Annie Mumolo in Season 2), who is based on Melissa Duck, although she has a more tomboy personality and appearance.

=== Pete Puma ===
Pete Puma
- Looney Tunes character
- First appearance: Rabbit's Kin (1952)
- Created by: Robert McKimson
- Voiced by: Stan Freberg (1952–2000); Joe Alaskey (1990–1991); John Kassir (2011–present); Jess Harnell (2015, 2023–present); Stephen Stanton (2021–present)

In-universe information
- Species: Puma
- Relatives: Peter Puma (father); Pat Puma (mother); Penelope Puma (sister); Paul Puma (cousin)

Pete Puma is a puma, originally voiced by Stan Freberg. He was created by Robert McKimson, and debuted in the November 15, 1952 short film Rabbit's Kin. Although Pete Puma was a one-shot character in Rabbit's Kin, he is often vividly remembered by cartoon fans, especially for his bizarre, inhaled, almost choking laugh (based on comedian Frank Fontaine's "Crazy Guggenheim" and "John L.C. Silvoney" characters). In Rabbit's Kin, Pete is chasing a young rabbit called "Shorty" who asks Bugs Bunny for help. Bugs is eager to oblige and subjects Pete to some of his trademark pranks.

Pete Puma has made occasional appearances on Tiny Toon Adventures (as the Acme Looniversity janitor), some episodes of The Sylvester and Tweety Mysteries, co-starred with Foghorn Leghorn in Pullet Surprise (voiced again by Freberg in all of these appearances), made a cameo appearance in the crowd scenes of Space Jam, Carrotblanca (as a waiter), Tweety's High-Flying Adventure (as one of the felines around the world whose pawprints Tweety collects, voiced again by Freberg), Bah, Humduck! A Looney Tunes Christmas (working as a janitor again), and is a supporting character in the Looney Tunes comic books. Pete (voiced by John Kassir) is a recurring character in The Looney Tunes Show as Daffy Duck's dimwitted friend, and working various jobs around town. In the Looney Tunes Cartoons shorts he appears in "Puma Problems" and "Bottoms Up", where he is voiced by Stephen Stanton. Pete Puma made a cameo in the 2026 film Coyote vs. Acme.

=== Rocky and Mugsy ===
Rocky and Mugsy
- Looney Tunes/Merrie Melodies characters
- First appearance: Golden Yeggs (1950; Rocky); Bugs and Thugs (1954; Mugsy)
- Created by: Friz Freleng
- Voiced by: Rocky: Dick Nelson (1946); Mel Blanc (1950–1981); Rob Paulsen (1990); Jim Cummings (1995–2000); Joe Alaskey (1999–2005); Maurice LaMarche (2002); James Adomian (2020–2022); Eric Bauza (2022); Mugsy: Mel Blanc (1954–1981); Frank Welker (1990–2000); Joe Alaskey (1999–2002); Kevin Michael Richardson (2005); Fred Tatasciore (2020–2022); Eric Bauza (2022)

In-universe information
- Species: Humans
- Gender: Both males

Rocky and Mugsy are characters in the Warner Bros. Looney Tunes and Merrie Melodies series of cartoons. They were created by Friz Freleng.

==== Biography ====
As an animator, Friz Freleng enjoyed creating new adversaries for Warners' star Bugs Bunny, since he felt that Bugs' other nemeses, such as Beaky Buzzard and Elmer Fudd (who actually appeared in many more Freleng shorts than is commonly realized), were too stupid to give the rabbit any real challenge. Though considered revolutionary for almost all of the late 1940s, Freleng's own Yosemite Sam had not yet been proven capable of fully fulfilling his creator's intentions. Freleng introduced two of these more formidable opponents as a pair of gangsters in the 1946 film Racketeer Rabbit, written by Michael Maltese. In the film, Bugs decides to find himself a new home, but the one he chooses is unfortunately occupied by a duo of bank robbers. The characters here are called "Rocky" (drawn like movie gangster Edward G. Robinson) and "Hugo" (a caricatured Peter Lorre). Both gangsters are performed by the Warner studio's longtime chief voice actor, Mel Blanc.

==== Appearances ====
Freleng liked the mobster idea, and he used the concept again in the 1950 short Golden Yeggs. This time, it is Porky Pig and Daffy Duck who run afoul of the mob, only this time Rocky has not only one sidekick, but an entire gang. Freleng also redesigned Rocky for this short, making him a more generalized caricature of the "tough guy" gangster rather than Robinson in particular. Freleng used several of the same techniques that would make Sam, his other Bugs villain, such a humorous character: despite Rocky's tough-guy demeanor, everlasting cigar (or cigarette) and foppish gangster dress, he really is little more than a dwarf in a much-too-large hat.

In 1953's Catty Cornered, Freleng set the mob against another of his comic duos, Sylvester and Tweety Bird. Gang leader Rocky, this time aided and abetted by a hulking simpleton named "Nick", kidnaps Tweety, and when Sylvester's bumbling predations accidentally free the bird, the poor puss is hailed as a hero.

The duo reappear in 1954's Bugs and Thugs, this time in the form that Freleng would keep them in for the rest of their run. Rocky is aided by a new thug, "Mugsy". Although his body type is similar to that of Nick's, he has less hair and is even less intelligent. Before the Warner studio closed for good in 1963, Rocky and Mugsy would appear in two more Freleng cartoons: Bugsy and Mugsy (1957) and The Unmentionables (1963). Mugsy also appears without his boss in a cameo as one of Napoleon Bonaparte's guards in the 1956 Freleng short Napoleon Bunny-Part.

Rocky and Mugsy have also appeared in various Looney Tunes-related merchandise. They are semi-regular characters in Looney Tunes comic books, for example. They also play the villains in the 2002 Xbox video game Loons: The Fight for Fame, a vs. fighting game in which the no-good gangsters attempt to run a film studio into the ground so that they can buy up the stock for next to nothing. Also, in Bugs Bunny Lost in Time, the pair are bosses of the 1930s era. They also appeared in episodes of The Sylvester and Tweety Mysteries and Duck Dodgers, as well as various cameo appearances in the movie Space Jam. In the movie, they are spotted wearing rabbit's ears and are shown shocked and terrified when Bugs gets crushed by a Monstar named Pound who was meant to crush Lola. They have a brief appearance in the direct-to-video film Tweety's High-Flying Adventure, where they reside in a cabin in Rio de Janeiro while hiding from the police; Mugsy is also in charge of placing the country postmark on Tweety's passport. Rocky and Mugsy both made a cameo appearance in Space Jam: A New Legacy were they are seen in line with the other Tunes leaving Tune World in Bugs Bunny's flashback.

Rocky and Mugsy made cameos in The Looney Tunes Show. In "It's a Handbag", Rocky and Mugsy's pictures were seen in the police's notebook. They were also seen in the Merrie Melodies segment "Stick to My Guns", sung by Yosemite Sam in the episode "Mrs. Porkbunny's" where Yosemite Sam mentions how he declared his vendetta on the Mafia when Sam threw a garbage can into their house. Around the end of the song, Rocky and Mugsy joined in on the final verse with Nasty Canasta, an angry bride, a female cannibal, a grizzly bear, and Toro the Bull.

Rocky and Mugsy appear in the Looney Tunes Cartoons shorts "Chain Gang(sters)" and "Hideout Hare", with Rocky voiced by James Adomian and Mugsy voiced by Fred Tatasciore.

==== Shorts ====
- Racketeer Rabbit (1946) – Features a prototype of Rocky.
- Golden Yeggs (1950) – Rocky's first cartoon, only cartoon paired with Daffy Duck and Porky Pig.
- Catty Cornered (1953) – Only pairing with Sylvester and Tweety.
- Bugs and Thugs (1954) – Mugsy's first cartoon.
- Napoleon Bunny-Part (1956) – Mugsy cameos as a guard.
- Bugsy and Mugsy (1957)
- The Unmentionables (1963) – Final original appearance of Rocky and Mugsy.

==== Parodies ====
In the television series Loonatics Unleashed, the characters Stoney and Bugsy are two gangster descendants of Rocky and Mugsy, being very similar to them in appearance.

Rocky and Mugsy are parodied as the South Park characters Nathan and Mimsy in the episode "Crippled Summer", Nathan having been introduced in the earlier episode "Up the Down Steroid". Throughout the episode's storylines, with various campers being parodies of other Looney Tunes characters, Nathan (Rocky) attempts to arrange fatal accidents for Jimmy Valmer (a counterpart to Bugs Bunny) which get ruined by Mimsy (Mugsy)'s stupidity. Nathan and Mimsy become reoccurring characters following their return appearance in the episode "Handicar". A poster depicting Rocky and Mugsy can be seen on the wall of Nathan's room.

=== Slowpoke Rodriguez ===
José "Slowpoke" Rodríguez
- Looney Tunes character
- First appearance: Mexicali Shmoes (1959)
- Created by: Friz Freleng
- Voiced by: Tom Holland (1962); Mel Blanc (1962); Joe Alaskey (1998); Jeff Bergman (2002); Seth Green (2007); Kerry Shale (2010); Hugh Davidson (2013)

In-universe information
- Species: Mouse
- Gender: Male
- Family: Speedy Gonzales (cousin)
- Nationality: Mexican

José "Slowpoke" Rodríguez ("Lento Rodríguez" in Spanish, though some more recent translations call him "Tranquilino") is a fictional animated cartoon mouse, part of the Looney Tunes' cast.

==== History and personality ====
He is described as "the slowest mouse in all Mexico" and is a cousin to Speedy Gonzales, who is known as the fastest. However, he mentions to his cousin that while he may be best known for his slow feet, he is not slow in "la cabeza" (the head). He speaks in a monotone voice and seems to never be surprised by anything. Due to being slow, he is generally, unlike Speedy, unable to outrun the pursuing cats who try to capture the both of them, but he is shown to have alternative (more effective) methods of resistance, such as his possession and use of a gun.

==== Theatrical cartoon appearances ====
Slowpoke only appeared in two cartoons alongside his cousin. The first, "Mexicali Shmoes" (1959), ends with two lazy cats, José and Manuel, the former learning the hard way that Slowpoke carries a gun. The second, "Mexican Boarders" (1962), revolves around Speedy trying to protect Slowpoke from Sylvester the Cat, but in the end, Slowpoke demonstrates his ability to hypnotize Sylvester into becoming his slave. The other mice comment at this point that "Slowpoke Rodríguez may be the slowest mouse in all Mexico, but he has the evil eye!"

==== Other appearances ====
- Slowpoke makes an appearance as a plot catalyst in the Super NES video game Speedy Gonzales: Los Gatos Bandidos.
- Slowpoke also appears alongside Speedy in a commercial for Virgin Media's broadband service in the UK, voiced by Kerry Shale.
- Slowpoke appears in The Looney Tunes Show episode "The Black Widow", voiced by Hugh Davidson. While his relation to Speedy Gonzales remains intact, he is depicted as the Sheriff of Tacapulco. After Daffy Duck and Porky Pig are arrested for streaking, Sheriff Slowpoke Rodríguez allows them to make a call. As Daffy Duck was unable to get through to Bugs Bunny (who was helping Lola Bunny return a diamond that she unintentionally stole from the museum at the time), he asks Sheriff Slowpoke if he would mind that he tries to call someone else. Daffy gets through to Speedy Gonzales who speeds all the way to Tacapulco to negotiate their release. Once that was done, Sheriff Slowpoke invites Daffy, Porky, and Speedy to join in Tacapulco's fiesta.

=== Yoyo Dodo ===
Yoyo Dodo
- Looney Tunes/Merrie Melodies character
- First appearance: Porky in Wackyland (1938)
- Created by: Bob Clampett
- Voiced by: Mel Blanc (1938–1949); Eric Bauza (2023); Frank Todaro (2025)

In-universe information
- Species: Dodo
- Gender: Male

Yoyo Dodo, also known as The Dodo Bird, is a wacky bird who first appeared in the 1938 short Porky in Wackyland. Yoyo is a green male dodo with red shoes, and a red umbrella sticking out from the top of his head, although some of his appearances have him in black-and-white.

Yoyo made a brief cameo appearance in the beginning of the 1988 film Who Framed Roger Rabbit.

In the 1990 television series Tiny Toon Adventures, a young dodo named Gogo Dodo is featured, who is the son of Yoyo.

Yoyo appeared in the 2023 Looney Tunes Cartoons stop-motion episode Daffy in Wackyland.

Yoyo appeared in the 2025 Bugs Bunny Builders episode Dodo's Wacky Funhouse, voiced by Frank Todaro.

Yoyo made a cameo appearance in the 2026 film Coyote vs. Acme.
