= Copyright renewal in the United States =

95 years protection for post-1964 works

Copyright renewal is a copyright formality through which an initial term of copyright protection for a work can be extended for a second term. Once the term of copyright protection has ended, the copyrighted work enters the public domain, and can be freely reproduced and incorporated into new works.

In the United States, works published before 1931 are all in the public domain under the provisions of the Copyright Act of 1909 and previous law. This act provided for an initial term of 28 years. This term could be extended for an additional 28 years by registering copyright renewal with the United States Copyright Office.

Works published before 1964 in the US are all in the public domain, excepting only those for which a renewal was registered with the US Copyright Office. Relatively few works from this era have had their copyrights renewed. A US Copyright Office study in 1961 found that fewer than 15% of registered copyrights had been renewed. While the copyrights for most Hollywood movies were renewed, some were overlooked by mistake. One example was It's a Wonderful Life, whose 1946 copyright thus lapsed in 1975, but this applied only to its images (allowing a colorized version); Dimitri Tiomkin's score and the short story, from which the screenplay was adapted, had separate copyrights properly renewed.

The US Copyright Act of 1976 modified these provisions so that the second, renewed term was 47 years. This extension applied to works that had been copyrighted between 1950 and 1977 and were thus in their first 28-year term of copyright protection. The maximum term of copyright protection became 75 years instead of the 56 years of the 1909 law, and applied to works whose copyrights were renewed in 1978 or later.

Copyright renewal has largely lost its significance for works copyrighted in the US in 1964 or after due to the Copyright Renewal Act of 1992. This law removed the requirement that a second term of copyright protection is contingent on a renewal registration. The effect was that any work copyrighted in the US in 1964 or after had a copyright term of 75 years, whether or not a formal copyright renewal was filed. There are some legal reasons for filing such renewal registrations. A further amendment to US copyright law in 1998 extended the total term of protection to seventy years beyond the life of the creator (or for corporately-generated material, 95 years) which now applies to all works copyrighted in 1964 or after.

== Determining whether a US copyright was renewed ==
Copyright renewal is significant for works with US copyright notices from 1931 to 1963. All copyright registrations and renewal registrations are published by the Copyright Office in its Catalog of Copyright Entries. For works with copyright notices from 1950 onward, the catalog can be searched online for renewals using a website maintained by the Copyright Office; the corresponding renewals are from 1978 to 1991. For copyrights from 1923 to 1949 (renewals from 1951 to 1977), online searches can be done for book copyrights using a database maintained by Stanford University. Many volumes of the Catalog of Copyright Entries have been digitized and can be accessed through the Internet Archive. Copies of the Catalog of Copyright Entries are available at the Copyright Office itself (in Washington, D.C., and at some libraries).

For listings of renewals and non-renewals of periodicals and newspapers after 1923, see the complete report prepared by the University of Pennsylvania Library.

== In the United Kingdom ==
The Statute of Anne, considered the world's first copyright law and one from which US law got its inspiration, granted copyright for an original term of 14 years plus an equally-sized renewal term. This was changed by the Copyright Act 1842, which provided for a single life-plus-seven-years term, or a 42-year one, whichever was longer.

== See also ==
- List of films in the public domain in the United States
- The Hirtle Chart illustrates the various possible copyright states for works published in the US in 1931 or later; works published before 1931 are all in the public domain.
