= Jack Frost =

Personification of frost and cold weather

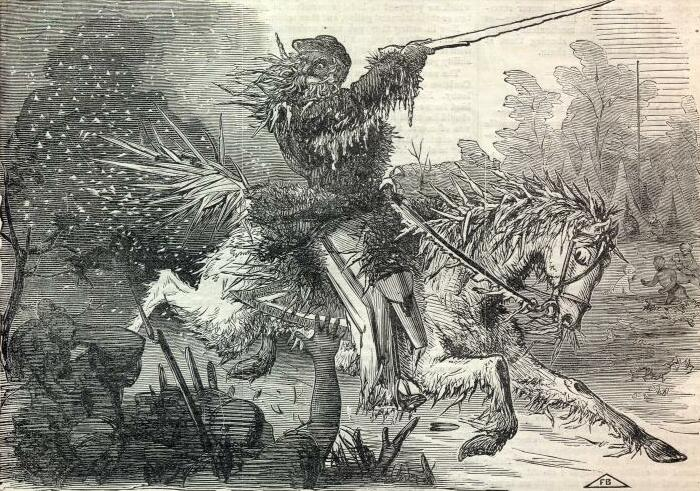
19th-century cartoon depicting Jack Frost as a United States major-general fighting on the side of the Union during the American Civil War

Jack Frost is a personification of frost, ice, snow, sleet, winter, and freezing cold. He is a variant of Old Man Winter who is held responsible for frosty weather, nipping the fingers and toes in such weather, coloring the foliage in autumn, and leaving fern-like patterns on cold windows in winter.

Starting in late 19th century literature, more developed characterizations of Jack Frost depict him as a sprite-like character, sometimes appearing as a sinister mischief-maker or as a hero.

== Background ==
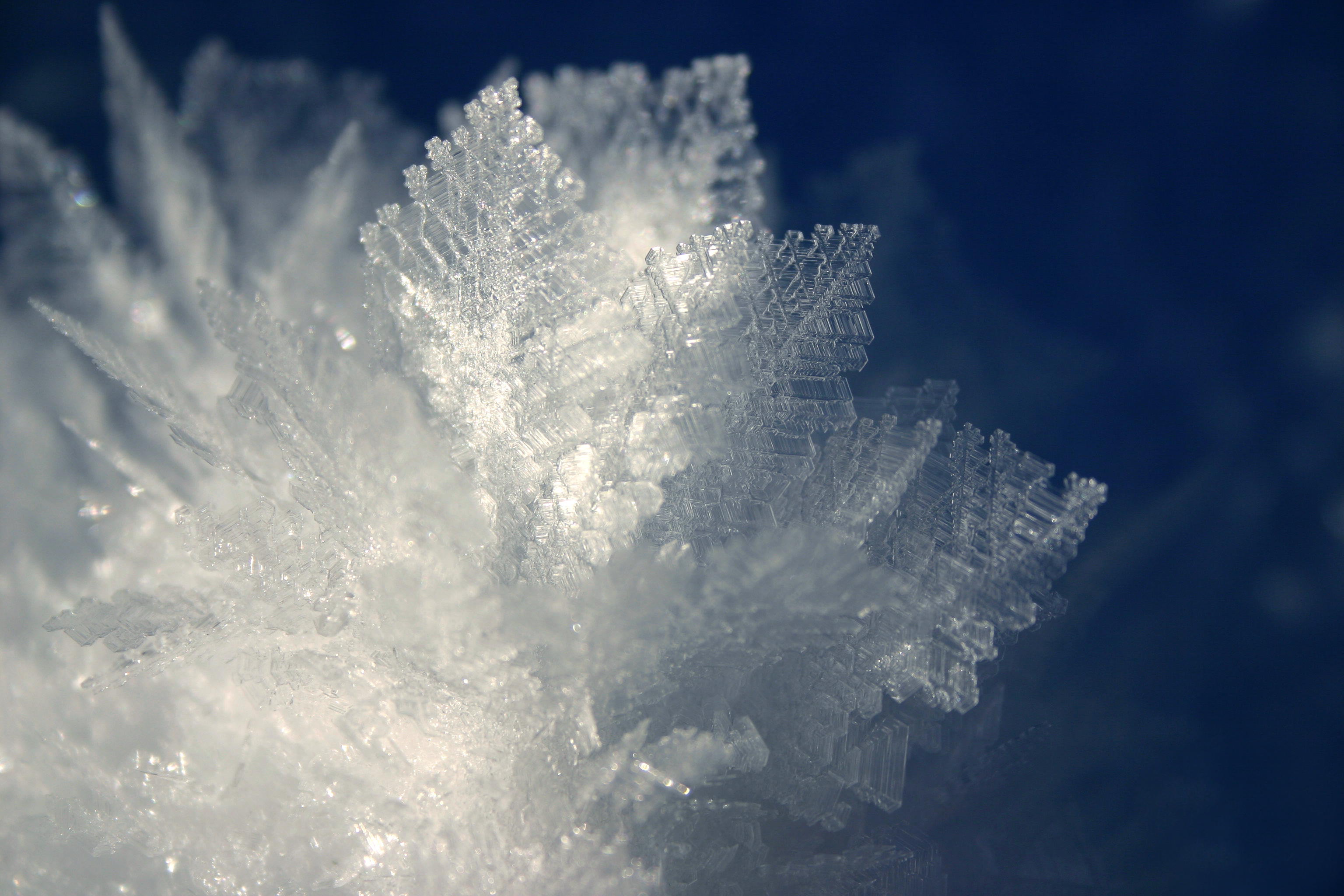
Close-up look at frost crystals.

Jack Frost is traditionally said to leave the frosty, fern-like patterns on windows on cold winter mornings (window frost or fern frost) and nipping the extremities in cold weather. Over time, window frost has become far less prevalent in the modern world due to the advance of double-glazing, but Jack Frost remains a well-known figure in popular culture. He is sometimes described or depicted with paint brush and bucket coloring the autumnal foliage red, yellow, brown, and orange. According to other customs, he is said to be the husband of Suzy Snowflake.

== History ==
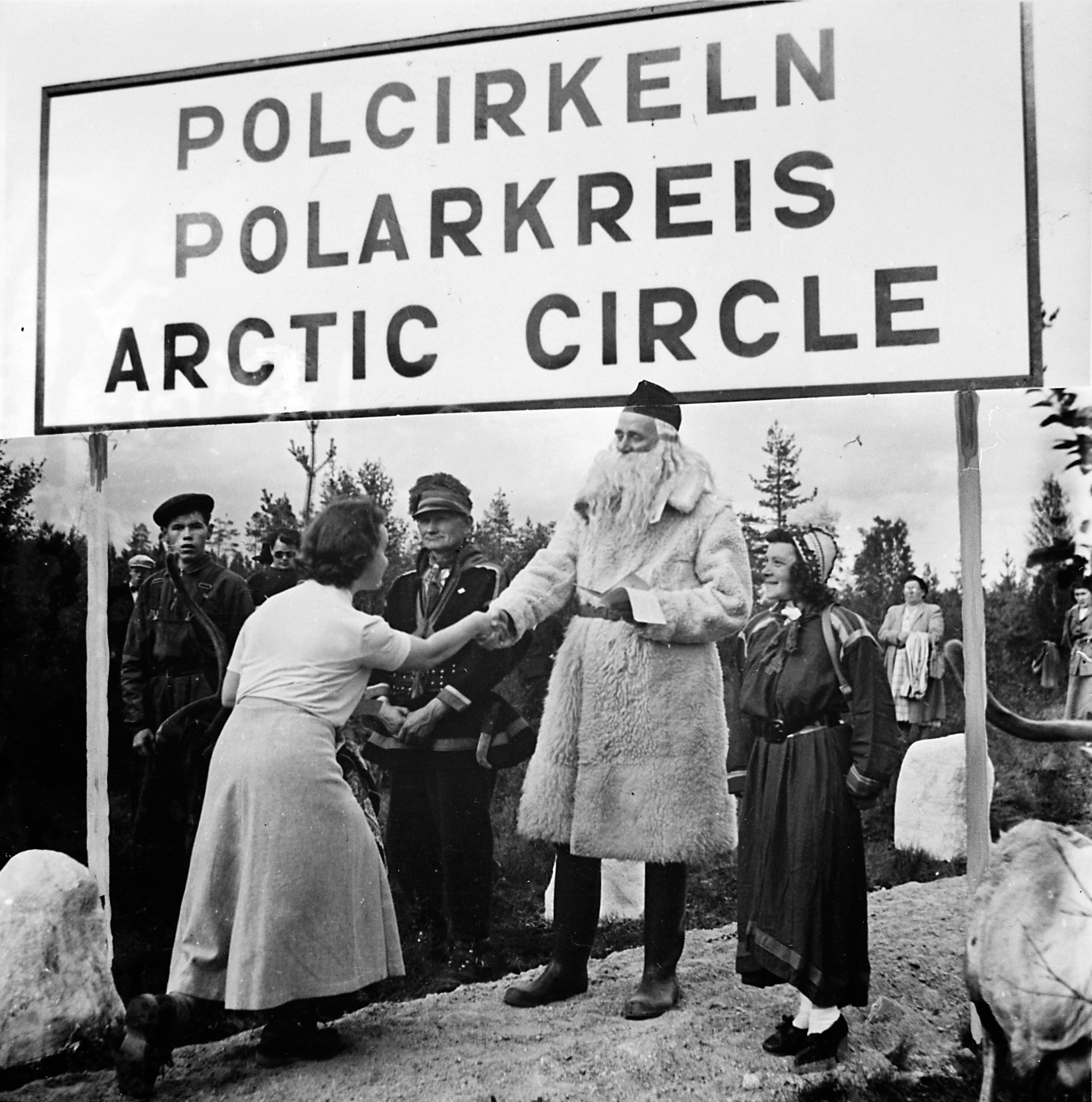
Passenger with SNLC cruise train greeting "kung Bore", the Swedish equivalent of Jack Frost, during a stop at the arctic circle in Sweden, 1950s.

Tales of Jack Frost may originate from Anglo-Saxon and Norse winter customs. In Swedish folklore, the equivalent is Kung Bore (King Bore); the name originating from Swedish 17th century writer Olaus Rudbeck.

There are various other mythological beings who take on a similar role yet have a unique folklore to them. In Russia, he has taken on a different form as Grandfather Frost, and in Germany there is instead a different entity altogether known as Mrs. Holle. The Hindu Kush mountain range is named after stories of a resident giant who would kill (kesh) those who attempted to pass, and has been compared to England's Jack Frost.

The earliest reference to Jack Frost in literature is in the book 'Round About Our Coal Fire, or Christmas Entertainments' published in 1732.

Jack Frost is mentioned in many songs – such as the wintertime song "The Christmas Song" (aka "Chestnuts Roasting on an Open Fire") – and movies. He has been presented as a villain in some media and a hero in others.

== In popular culture ==
=== Literature ===
- Hannah Flagg Gould's (1789-1865) poem "The Frost" features a mischievous being responsible for the quieter phenomena of winter, beautiful ice paintings on windows but who also got upset at lack of gifts and caused the cold to break and ruin things.
- In Margaret T. Canby's "Birdie and His Fairy Friends" (1874), there is a short story titled "The Frost Fairies." In this story, Jack Frost is the king of the Winter Spirits and is described as a kind fellow who wants to help children, whereas a king of a neighboring kingdom, King Winter, is cruel to them. The story tells the origins of how Jack Frost began to oversee the coloring of the leaves of the forest in fall.
  - In 1891 Helen Keller made her own reproduction of the story, titled The Frost King.
- In Charles Sangster's "Little Jack Frost", published in The Aldine, (Vol.7, No.16, 1875) Jack Frost is a playful being who runs around playing pranks and 'nose-biting', coating places with snow before being chased off by Dame Nature for spring.
- In L. Frank Baum's The Life and Adventures of Santa Claus (1902), Jack Frost is the son of the otherwise unnamed Frost King. He takes pleasure in nipping "scores of noses and ears and toes", but Santa Claus, who likes Jack (who he sees as a "jolly rogue") though he mistrusts him, asks him to spare the children. Jack says he will, if he can resist the temptation. The same Jack appears in "The Runaway Shadows", a short story by Baum. In this story, he has the power to freeze shadows, separating them from their owners, making them their own living entities.
- In Laurell K. Hamilton's Meredith Gentry series, a character emerges as the original Jack Frost.
- Jack Frost has appeared as a minor character in the Rupert Bear stories.
- In the Rainbow Magic books by Daisy Meadows, Jack Frost is an antagonist who causes trouble in Fairyland. He is accompanied by pesky goblins who steal the fairies' important objects, and try to sabotage them.
- Jack Frost also appears in "First Death in Nova Scotia", a poem by Elizabeth Bishop.
- In the novel Hogfather by Terry Pratchett, Jack grows tired of "fern patterns" and paints more elaborate pictures on windows.
- Jack Frost appears in The Veil trilogy of novels by Christopher Golden.
- The Man Jack, an enigmatic assassin, calls himself Jack Frost in The Graveyard Book by Neil Gaiman.
- The Stranger, a picture book by Chris Van Allsburg, stars Jack Frost as a lonely stranger with amnesia.
- In Amy Wilson's The Lost Frost Girl, Jack Frost’s daughter Owl discovers powers she’s inherited from Jack and ventures into the world of the fae.

=== Comics ===
- Jack Frost appears in Windsor McCay's comic strip Little Nemo in Slumberland, first being mentioned in a strip published in 1906 and then appearing in another strip published the subsequent year.
- John T. McCutcheon's painting of "Jack Frost" first appeared in the Chicago Tribune front page on September 24, 1922. Jack is depicted painting individual leaves, and lamenting that people will admire his work and then rake the leaves into piles and burn them.
- In comic books, Jack Frost appears as a superhero in works published by Timely Comics (now Marvel Comics) in the 1940s.
- Marvel Comics had a second Jack Frost, the first alias of the original Blizzard.
- Jack Frost is the alias of Dane McGowan one of the main characters from the 1990s Vertigo series The Invisibles.
- In Jack of Fables (a Fables spinoff) the titular character became Jack Frost for a period of time. A second Jack Frost ("Jack too, or Jack two") appears as the son of Jack Horner and The Snow Queen.
- In DC Comics, Jack Frost is a descendant of the frost giants, the personification of winter, and former lover of the Asgardian hero Siegfried.

=== Films ===
- Jack Frost, a Russian film from 1964, has the title Morozko—the Russian equivalent of Jack Frost.
- In the 1997 film Jack Frost, Scott MacDonald plays a serial killer turned into a snowman who continues his rampage. This movie spawned a sequel in 2000: Jack Frost 2: Revenge of the Mutant Killer Snowman.
- In the 1998 film Jack Frost, Michael Keaton plays a human turned into a snowman by the name of Jack Frost.
- Jack Frost appears as the primary antagonist in The Santa Clause 3: The Escape Clause played by Martin Short.
- Jack Frost appears as the main protagonist of Rise of the Guardians, loosely based on the series Guardians of Childhood by William Joyce, voiced by Chris Pine.

=== Radio, animation, and television ===
- The title character in Ub Iwerks's 1934 animated short Jack Frost in the ComiColor Cartoons series.
- The title character (voiced by Robert Morse) in Rankin/Bass's 1979 film Jack Frost.
- The character (voiced by Paul Frees) also makes appearances in the Christmas television special Frosty's Winter Wonderland and in Rudolph and Frosty's Christmas in July.

=== Video games ===
- Jack Frost also appears as Atlus' corporate mascot, being mainly featured in the Megami Tensei franchise and its spin-off franchise Persona and the game Jack Bros.

== See also ==
- Frau Holle
- Father Frost (fairy tale)
- Heikki Lunta
- Snow Miser
- Yuki-onna
- KalGa Jaad
- General Winter, also known as General Frost
- Ded Moroz
