= Jack Frost (1934 film) =

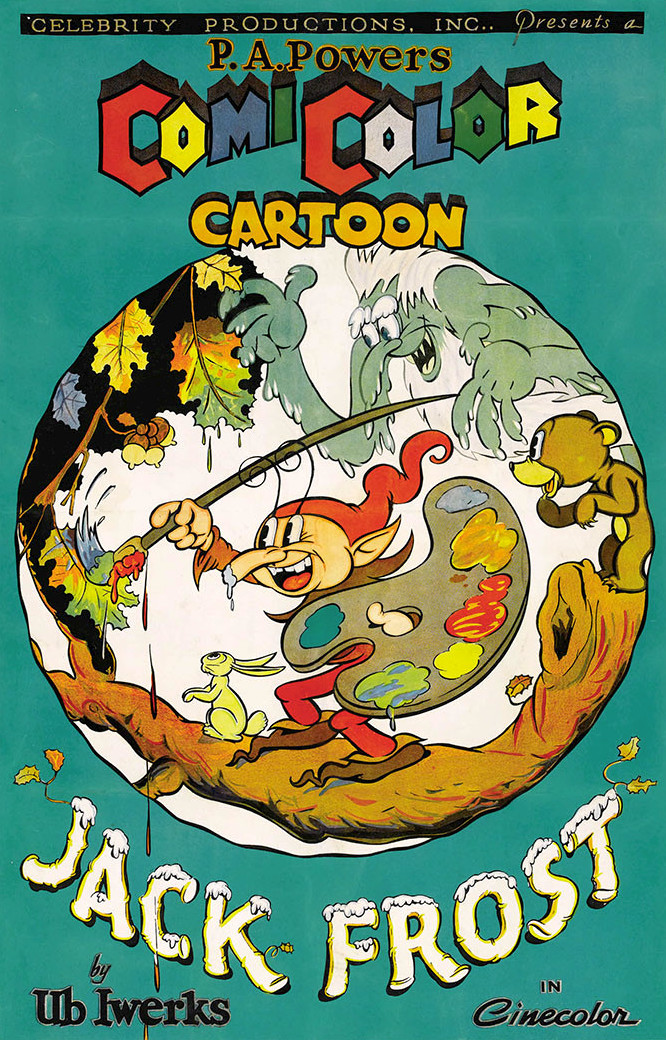
- Directed by: Ub Iwerks
- Produced by: Ub Iwerks
- Music by: Carl Stalling
- Color process: Cinecolor; Color Systems, Inc. (1973 Korean redrawn three-strip color edition with stock music and sounds added)
- Production company: Ub Iwerks Studio
- Distributed by: Celebrity Productions
- Release date: December 24, 1934
- Running time: 8:31
- Country: United States
- Language: English

The Original Cartoon

Jack Frost is a 1934 animated short film produced by Ub Iwerks and is part of the ComiColor Cartoons series.

== Plot summary ==
The animals are enjoying the warm summer and playing together. Suddenly, Jack Frost arrives to the forest and paints the world in autumn colors. He announces the coming winter to the animals of the forest and urges them to prepare for it. Most of the animals, fearing Old Man Winter, begin their hibernation preparation. A grizzly bear cub named Billy musically retorts "I don't have to worry; I don't have to care. My coat is very furry, I'm a frizzly, grizzly bear". His mom chides him if he meets Old Man Winter, he'll change his tune. Back home, she prepares him to go to bed by putting on his nightshirt. When he tries to sneak away to go back out, his mom catches him and drags him onto her knee, spanks him, and tucks him in. When his parents have fallen asleep (hibernation), the cub prepares to run away from home. He sees Jack Frost paint frost patterns on his bedroom window and follows him. Jack Frost catches Billy outside while he's painting pumpkins into jack-o'-lanterns and warns him of Old Man Winter again. Billy repeats his mantra, and a miffed Jack Frost exits.

Billy notices the jack-o'-lanterns, a scarecrow and trees coming to life and sing. At first, he's happy and thinks he made the right choice to leave his home. Billy's retort is interrupted by the surprise blast of cold winds and heavy snowfall. The scarecrow suddenly turns into a snowman. Billy is soon confronted by the sinister Old Man Winter who chases after him. He tries to take shelter in several trees, but is kicked out by the owners each time...save a hospitable skunk whose scent Billy spurns. Old Man Winter corners Billy within a hollow tree trunk, trapping the cub with icicles. Billy weeps over his entrapment as Jack Frost arrives and mocks Billy's earlier bravado. He apologizes to Jack Frost and begs to return him home to his warm bed. A cheery Jack Frost uses his paintbrush to turn the ice to candy canes and Billy licks his way to freedom. Jack Frost takes him back to his home using the palette. He tucks the happy cub back to his room where he's sleeping peacefully. After tucking him in bed, Jack Frost closes the window and paints the word "Finis".

== Alternate versions ==
In 1973, Jack Frost became one of several cartoons to be redrawn and colorized by Color Systems, Inc. under the name "Radio and Television Packagers" despite the fact that the cartoon was already in color and its original audio was replaced by stock music and sounds. It's likely that the company got a hold of a silent black and white print of the cartoon to colorize.

== Sequels ==
The character Old Man Winter returned in the 1935 film Summertime.

== In other media ==
Hip-hop musician Drake shows a clip of the short film in the beginning of his music video "Whisper My Name".

== Image gallery ==
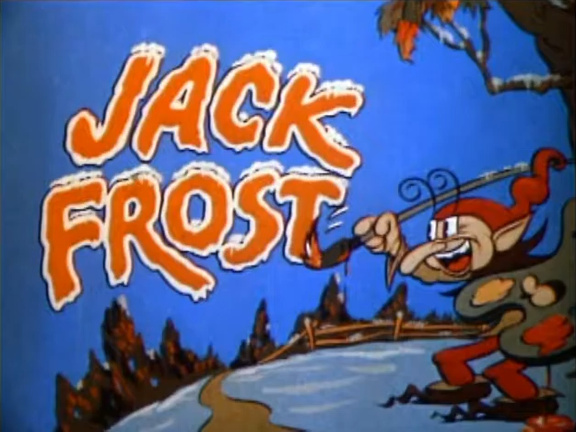
Title card
