= Summertime (1935 film) =

- Directed by: Ub Iwerks
- Produced by: Ub Iwerks
- Music by: Carl W. Stalling
- Distributed by: Celebrity Productions
- Release date: June 15, 1935
- Running time: 7:40
- Language: English

The Cartoon

Summertime is a 1935 animated short film directed and produced by Ub Iwerks and is part of the ComiColor Cartoons series.

The film was originally called In the Good Ol' Summertime.

== Plot summary ==
The film builds further on the plot in Jack Frost in which Old Man Winter comes to the forest.

In Summertime Old Man Winter fights to keep winter in the forest during the spring.
