= Jack and the Beanstalk (1933 film) =

- Directed by: Ub Iwerks
- Based on: Jack and the Beanstalk
- Produced by: Ub Iwerks
- Music by: Carl Stalling
- Distributed by: Celebrity Productions
- Release date: 30 November 1933
- Running time: 8:11
- Language: English

Jack and the Beanstalk is a 1933 animated short film directed by Ub Iwerks and part of the ComiColor cartoon series.

The film was the first in the ComiColor cartoon series.

== Plot summary ==
Jack lives with his mother. They are poor and have neither food nor money. Jack takes their cow to Ye Olde Butcher Shoppe to sell it, but a bystander offers him three dancing beans instead. At home, his mother is outraged when she learns of the deal and throws the beans out the window and sends Jack to bed. During the night, it rains and the beans germinate.

In the morning, Jack sees a huge beanstalk that has grown through the clouds and into the sky. He starts climbing it but soon grows tired. The leaves then elevate him further up. Above the clouds there is a castle. Jack enters the castle and is captured by a giant woman. She dips him in Ye Olde Mustard and intends to eat him, but is interrupted by a loud banging on the castle door and instead hides him in a pipe. A giant man enters claiming he smells the blood of an Englishman. The woman denies this and instead suggests this may be the smell of the mans feet. The man makes several attempts to light his pipe, but Jack blows out the matches. The man eventually gives up and instead demands the woman bring him his moneybag, his self-playing harp and his hen that lays eggs containing coins.

The man falls asleep and Jack attempts to steal the treasures but is captured. He managers to escape on the flying harp but the man follows in pursuit. Back on the ground, Jack chops down the beanstalk, the man falls to his death and a tombstone appears reading "Here lies the giant who tried to kill Jack, – Now he's six feet under flat on his back".

In the final scene, Jack and his mother are fed by servants, the harp plays music and the hen lays coins into a cash register.
