= Don Quixote (cartoon film) =

- Directed by: Ub Iwerks
- Based on: Don Quixote
- Produced by: Ub Iwerks
- Music by: Carl Stalling
- Distributed by: Celebrity Productions
- Release date: 26 November 1934
- Running time: 8:08
- Language: English

Don Quixote is a 1934 animated short film directed by Ub Iwerks and part of the ComiColor cartoon series.

== Plot summary ==
Don Quixote is imprisoned in a padded cell at Ye Olde Bughouse where he reads chivalric romances of the type "When Knights Were Bold", "A Knight in June", "Winning Noon and Knight", "Ten Knights in a Bar Room", "A Thousand and One Knights", and "Wotta Knight". Don Quixote picks up a broom and uses it as both a horse and a sword. When the guard enters the cell, Don Quixote overpowers him and escapes, swinging in lianas until he lands in a cart labelled "Ye Olde Junk" and ends up with a full body armor, lance, and shield. The guard wakes up and alarm is sent to the "Raddio Polyce".

Don Quixote fights a windmill, which he imagines is a giant. The windmill gains the upper hand and spanks him. Don Quixote eats a handful of nails and defeats the building. The guard is searching for the fugitive like a detection dog.

Don Quixote hears the voice of a woman and imagines she is a fair maiden in need of rescue, held captive of a fire breathing dragon (actually an excavator), which he defeats by turning it into a pile of cans. He enters the room of the imagined maiden, but instead it is a piano playing woman who instantly is enamored with him, feeling that are not mutual. The guard appears and the woman turns her attention to him instead.

Don Quixote and the guard run back to the asylum and lock themselves in, burning all books and the keys to the cell.
