= Puss in Boots (1934 film) =

- Directed by: Ub Iwerks
- Based on: Puss in Boots
- Produced by: Ub Iwerks
- Music by: Carl Stalling
- Animation by: Jimmie Culhane; Al Eugster
- Distributed by: Celebrity Productions
- Release date: 17 May 1934
- Running time: 7:13
- Language: English

Puss in Boots is a 1934 animated short film directed by Ub Iwerks and part of the ComiColor cartoon series.

== Plot summary ==
Three kittens play tic-tac-toe under the supervision for their father (who wears a belt and shoes) and accidentally fall into the water. A boy saves the kittens from drowning by throwing them his bagpipe. The kittens' father is grateful and befriends the boy. The town crier announces that "Who so ever saves the Princess from the nasty ogre, he shall marry her". The boy and the four cats travel to Ogre's cave, where the princess has been transformed into a little white bird and is held captive in a birdcage. During a failed attempt to enter the Ogre's cottage, the boy is discovered and the Ogre transforms him into a little brown bird and he is locked in the birdcage too.

The cat hoists up the birdcage from the top of the roof. The rope breaks and the cage falls on the Ogre's head, but the door swings open and allow the birds to escape. The cats fall into the cottage from the roof, and the kittens end up in the cage on the Ogre's head, clawing him badly before he successfully removes the cage from his head, revealing a tic-tac-toe game on his forehead.

The outraged ogre corners the cat and threatens him with his transformation liquid. The kittens jump into the ogre's pants, allowing the cats to escape into a rat hole in the wall. The ogre's bottom reveal several finished games of tic-tac-toe. The cat tells the ogre "You're too big and fat for a hole like that. Don't you wish that you could be a rat?" The ogre transforms himself into a rat and goes into the hole where he is captured by the cat.

The cat transforms the boy and the princess back to human form. Their kissing is interrupted by a game of tic-tac-toe on the boy's bottom.
