= Lost in a Hotel =

1911 film

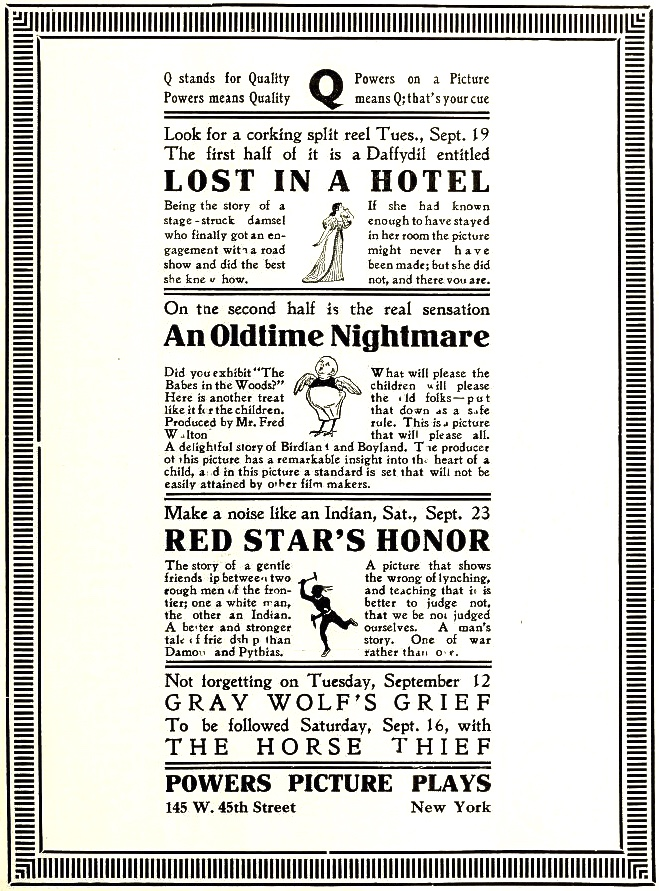
- Powers' promotion of the film as the lead short on a split reel, September 1911
- Directed by: Uncredited (Note: Although the director of this film is not credited in available 1911 trade publications, it is likely that it was Fred Walton, who worked at Powers Moving Picture Company at this time and directed the short An Old-Time Nightmare, which was the Powers short that shared the same split-reel with Lost in a Hotel.)
- Produced by: Patrick Powers
- Starring: Uncredited cast
- Production companies: Powers Moving Picture Company; Nepera Park, New York
- Distributed by: Motion Picture Distributors and Sales Company
- Release date: September 19, 1911
- Running time: 7 minutes (approximately 500 feet)
- Country: United States
- Language: Silent (English intertitles)

Lost in a Hotel is a 1911 American silent comedy film. It was released as the first half of a 1000-foot "split reel", with the latter half being the comedy-fantasy short An Old-Time Nightmare. Both films, currently presumed to be "lost", were produced by the Powers Moving Picture Company of New York. Neither the director nor the performers in this film are identified in 1911 reviews or in plot summaries and advertisements published in trade journals at the time.

== Plot ==
According to reviews in 1911 trade publications, this brief film featured comedic situations that confronted a "stage-struck young lady" who desired to become a professional entertainer. She was portrayed joining a traveling theatrical company, convinced that the life of a performer is filled with only thrills and glamor. Soon, however, she experiences the unappealing, "seamy" side of life behind the stage curtain. On her first night traveling with the company and staying in a large hotel with all its members, she finds herself too excited about her new career to sleep. Bored, she leaves her room in just her dressing robe or, as it is referred to in 1911 reviews, her "kimono". She visits the room of one of the showgirls. Now well past midnight, the young woman tries to return to her own room, but she realizes that she forgot its number and all the rooms in the hotel's long hallways look identical. The remainder of the film consisted of her awkwardly entering room after room and meeting other various odd, erratic characters in the troupe. After she finally locates her room, she concludes from those strange encounters that a career as an entertainer is certainly not filled with glamor, now seems far less appealing, and involves a lifestyle not meant for her. The short ended with the enlightened "maiden" returning home to her mother.

== Cast ==
No cast credits are given in 1911 reviews of the film, in related advertisements, or in any other references to the film published in trade papers or journals at the time.

- Uncredited performer as the "star-struck young lady"
- Uncredited performer as the "show girl"
- Uncredited performers as other members of "theatrical company"

== Split-reel release and reception ==
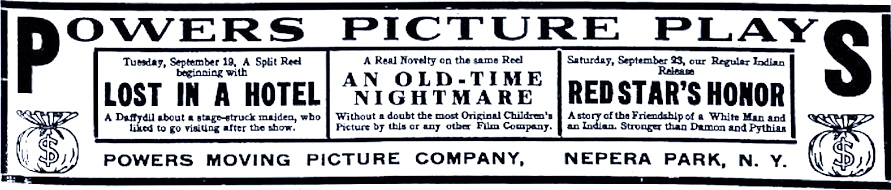
Advertisement in The Billboard, 1911

During the silent era, it was common practice for production companies to load two short films onto a single reel, creating what was referred to then as a "split reel". (Note: The "List Of Films And Their Release Dates" in the October 7, 1911 issue of The Billboard provides examples of the frequent use of split reels in film distribution during the early silent era.) Combining films onto one reel not only reduced the number of reels shipped to theaters by distributors, it also reduced the number of reel changes on the projectors at those locations. In September 1911, when Powers Moving Picture Company distributed its split-reel copies of Lost in a Hotel and An Old-Time Nightmare, this comedy comprised the first half of all the shared reels released. The few available reviews of the film in 1911 are positive. In its October 7 issue, the trade journal The Moving Picture World compliments the "speedy comedy" for evoking "several laughs" and curtly ending its assessment with "It is commendable."

== "Lost" film status ==
No copy of this Powers short is listed among the motion-picture holdings of the Library of Congress, the UCLA Film Archives, in the collection of moving images at the Museum of Modern Art, the George Eastman Museum, the Library and Archives Canada, or in other major film repositories in the United States, Canada, or Europe. The film is therefore presumed to be a lost production.

Powers Moving Picture Company continued producing films as a single, independent studio for only seven months after the release of Lost in a Hotel. In May 1912 Powers formally merged with other production companies to form Universal Film Manufacturing Company. All the resources of those companies were later consolidated by Carl Laemmle and transferred in 1915 to Universal's new, burgeoning studio complex in Universal City, California. If any master negatives and prints of this film and others by Powers were later physically transferred to Universal, that footage may have been lost in devastating fires that often occurred throughout the motion-picture industry in the silent era, including at Universal. At any given time, many millions of feet of old and new films that had been shot on unstable, highly flammable cellulose nitrate stock were stored in film vaults and in various studio warehouses. (Note: The year 1922 provides examples of the scope of the film industry's losses to fires. In that year alone, Universal Pictures lost over 1,285,000 feet of film in just two fires: "Blast Rocks Universal City...Films Worth Half-Million Are Total Loss" (185,000 feet destroyed), Los Angeles Times, May 25, 1922, p. II1; "Movie Films Burned at Universal City...Destroys 1,100,000 Feet of Pictures", The New York Times, December 24, 1922, p. 13. ProQuest.) It is more likely, however, that subsequent studio managers deemed this short and its split-reel companion An Old-Time Nightmare to be inconsequential releases by a short-lived, secondary production company and were discarded or perhaps were simply left unattended and allowed to decay and disintegrate over time.
