= Aladdin and the Wonderful Lamp (1934 film) =

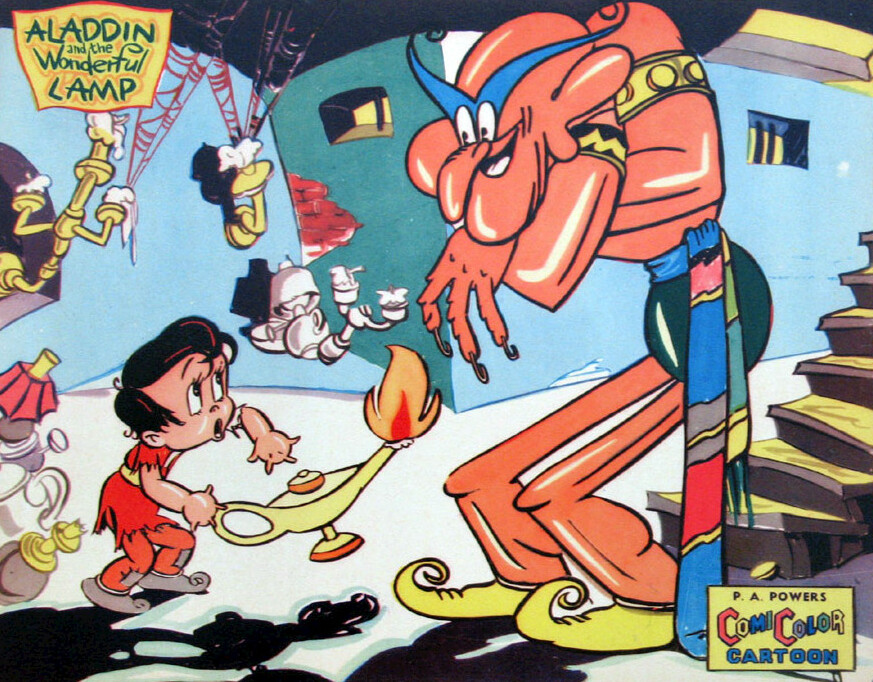
- Lobby card
- Directed by: Ub Iwerks
- Based on: Aladdin
- Produced by: Ub Iwerks
- Music by: Art Turkisher
- Animation by: Grim Natwick; Berny Wolf
- Distributed by: Celebrity Productions
- Release date: 10 August 1934
- Running time: 7:52
- Language: English

Aladdin and the Wonderful Lamp is a 1934 animated short film directed by Ub Iwerks and part of the ComiColor cartoon series.

== Plot summary ==
A lamp trader holds a boy captive in his cellar and makes him clean lamps. Through the window, the boy sees a procession of elephants with the sultan. He sees the sultan's daughter, the princess, riding a white dromedary and is enamored with her. The lamp trader deposits a new batch of lamps into the cellar and orders the boy to polish them.

Polishing one of the lamps summons a red genie, granting the boy wishes. The lamp trader sees this and blurts out "A magic lamp? It's colossal!" The boy wishes himself to the sultan's house. When there, he tells the sultan that he wants to marry the princess. The sultan is not impressed by the beggar in rags, and the boy wishes himself fancier clothes. The sultan asks what the boy can offer his daughter. The boy makes another wish from the genie and money falls from the ceiling into a pile. The lamp trader attempts to steal the lamp and in the commotion, the lamp is swallowed by the sultan. The sultan runs away and is chased by the lamp trader and the boy. They all run over a man with a blowtorch working on an assembly of pipes.

The sultan hits the lamp trader over the head with a string instrument. The boy attaches the blowtorch to a loose string from the instrument and the lamp trader runs away, the blowtorch burning his bottom.

The boy rubs the sultan's stomach, the genie appears through the sultan's mouth, and the boy wishes his lamp back.

The boy, the princess and the genie celebrate when they hear the lamp trader from the street, offer his services. The boy wishes a pile of lamps to fall on the trader.

== Image gallery ==
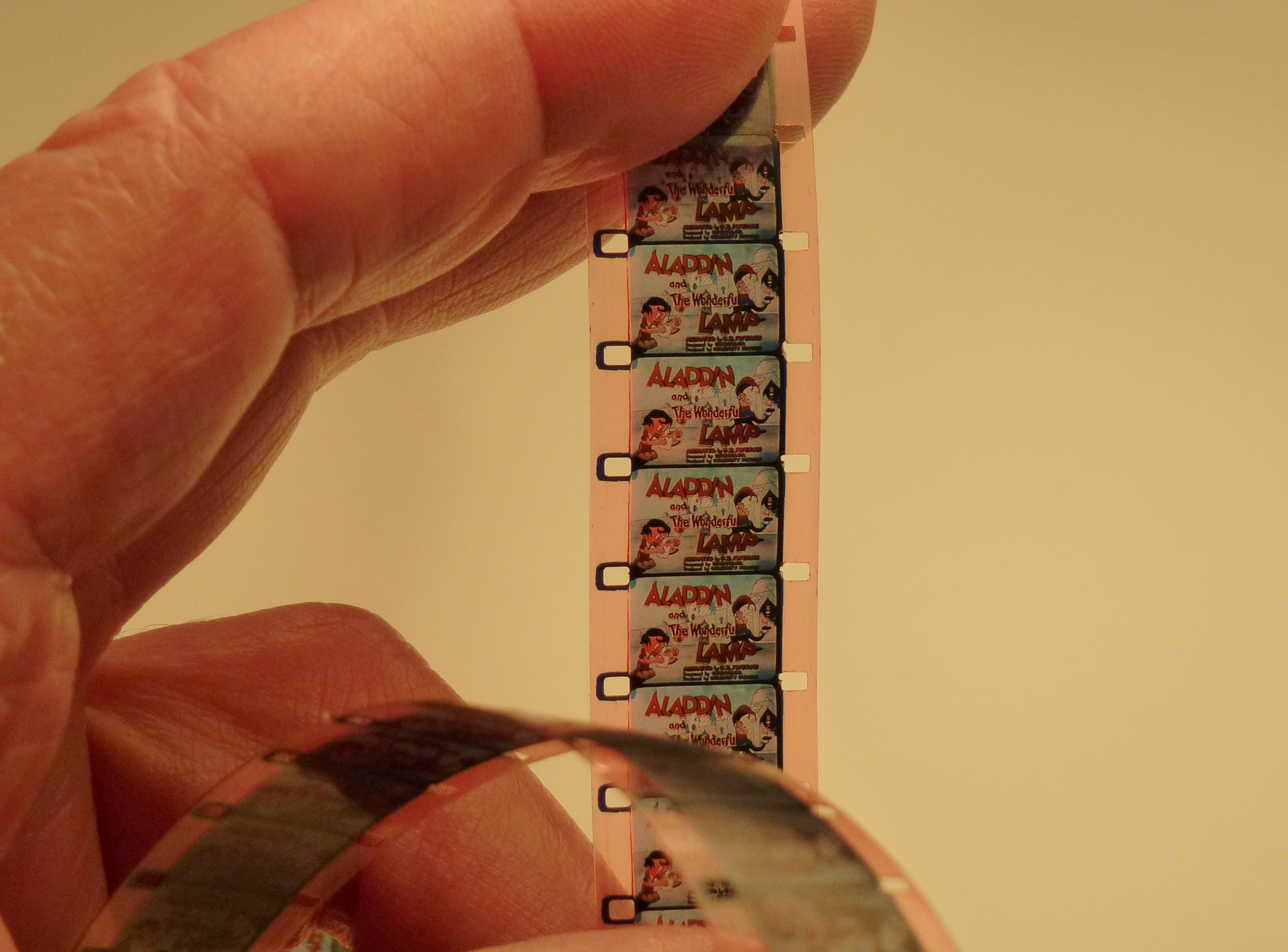
title screen
