= Simple Simon (1935 film) =

1935 film by Ub Iwerks

- Directed by: Ub Iwerks
- Produced by: Pat Powers
- Starring: Pinto Colveg
- Music by: Carl Stalling
- Color process: Cinecolor
- Production company: Celebrity Productions
- Distributed by: Celebrity Productions
- Release date: November 15, 1935
- Running time: 6:44
- Country: United States
- Language: English

The Cartoon

Simple Simon is a 1935 ComiColor Cartoons animated short film produced by Ub Iwerks. It is a humorous retelling of the classic nursery rhyme. This short film was released on November 15, 1935.

== Synopsis ==
Simple Simon uses as rod with a white duck to get a pie up to him. Simon tries to eat the pie and the seller throws him and the duck out and a sign that says "Room For Rent" and closes the door. The Mother Goose characters walk past Simon and are going to the Faire. Simon meets a chef to try his samples. He eats too many samples, much to the annoyance of the chef. He chases Simon and the duck to the Judge's Stand. The duck wins a contest and the judges chase him as well. Simon climbs up a ladder and jumps in the water. He climbs up a giraffe and jumps past acrobats. He lands into a barrel which was kicked away by a fair performer. After the barrel breaks, Simon becomes dizzy. He hallucinates and sees three belly dancers. He attempts to hug one of them, but it turns out to be the chef. Simon is in a shack with a lion. He escapes and saves the chef from the lion, but he continues chasing Simon. Simon disguised himself as an Arabian prince in an attempt to fool him. The duck starts crying because he can't find Simon. Simon approaches the duck and hugs him. The judges arrive and put coins in Simon's hat for winning the contest. The chef tries to charge at Simon one final time, but the lion chases him away.
