= The Brave Tin Soldier (1934 film) =

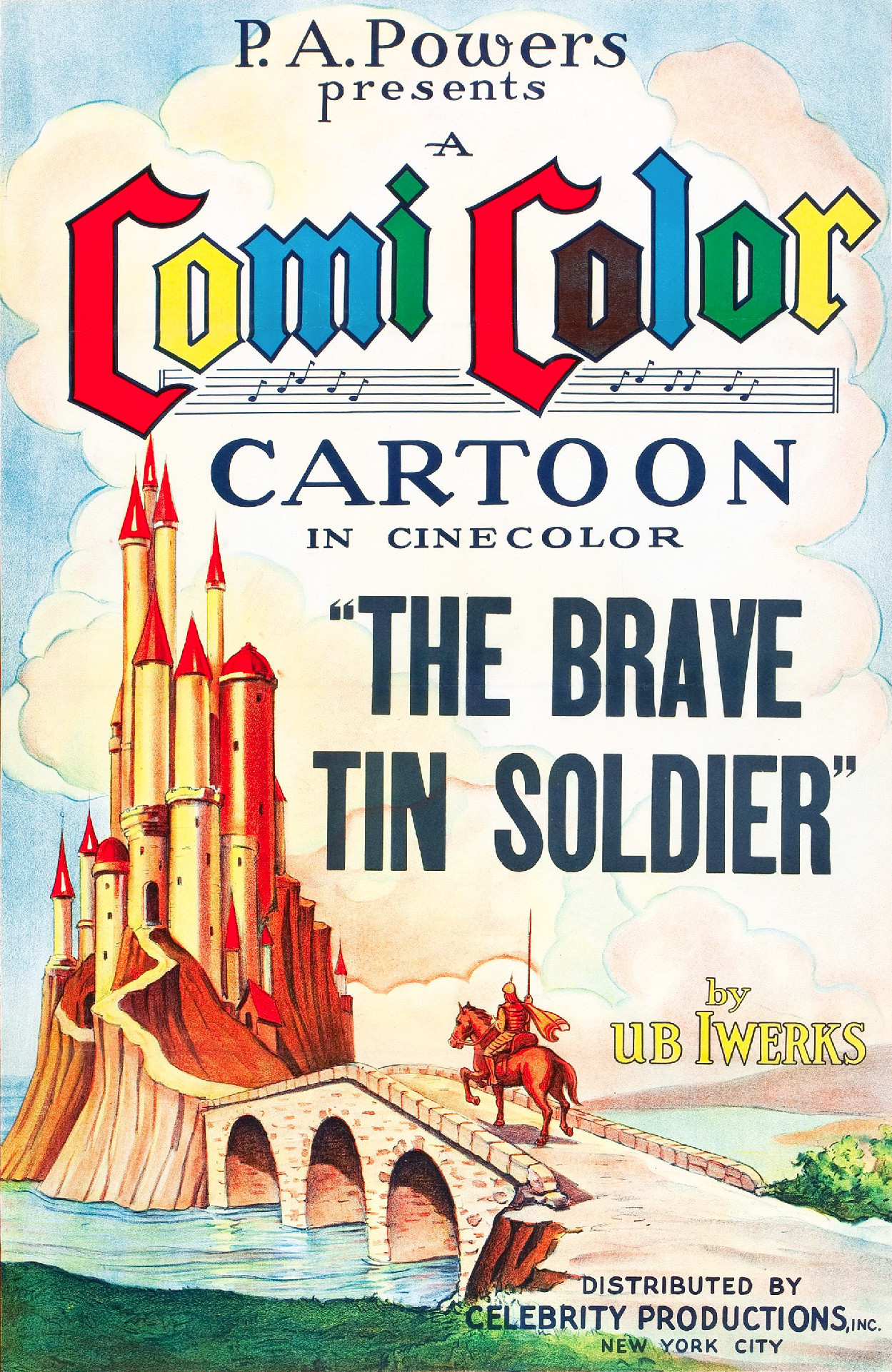
- Film poster
- Directed by: Ub Iwerks
- Based on: The Steadfast Tin Soldier
- Produced by: Ub Iwerks
- Music by: Art Turkisher
- Animation by: Jimmie Culhane; Al Eugster
- Distributed by: Celebrity Productions
- Release date: 7 April 1934
- Running time: 7:14
- Language: English

The Brave Tin Soldier is a 1934 animated short film directed by Ub Iwerks and part of the ComiColor cartoon series.

The film is also known as "Christmas in a Junkyard".

== Plot ==
A toymaker creates tin soldiers. He drops one of them on the floor, accidentally breaks one of his legs off and throws him into the waste. The toymaker goes to bed and at midnight a soldier blows a bugle call and all toys come to life: Dolls, a jack-in-the-box, roly-poly Laurel and Hardy dolls, marionettes, a model railway. The discarded soldier climbs up from the waste basket and realizes he only has one leg, and other toys taunt him. A ballerina expresses her sympathies for him and he is infatuated with her.

Two guards outside a castle blows another bugle call and a parade of soldiers exits the gate, followed by a trolley carrying the king. The soldier pushes the ballerina on a swing, but the king, who also takes a liking to the ballerina, tells the soldier to scram. The king makes unwelcome advances to the ballerina and the soldier, from a distance, loads his rifle with a match, lighting a firework piece which hits the king in the bottom.

A trial is arranged. The tin soldier pleads not guilty, though a Jack-in-the-box Groucho Marx sustains, but later overrules the objections, declaring a fair trial. The ballerina begs for the soldier's life, but the soldier is sentenced to death. At the execution, the soldier refuses a blindfold, and the ballerina again begs for his life. When she is not heard, she runs to the soldier to embrace him. Shots from the firing squad push the couple into the fireplace and they melt into one heart, and taps is played.

Smoke from the soldier and the ballerina, in the shape of a heart, rises through the chimney and into the night sky. At the pearly gates of toy heaven, a toy Saint Peter awaits with the Keys of Heaven at his side and a halo above his head. The soldier's missing leg grows back and he does a celebratory tap dance. Then, the gates open, and all three enter.

== Image gallery ==
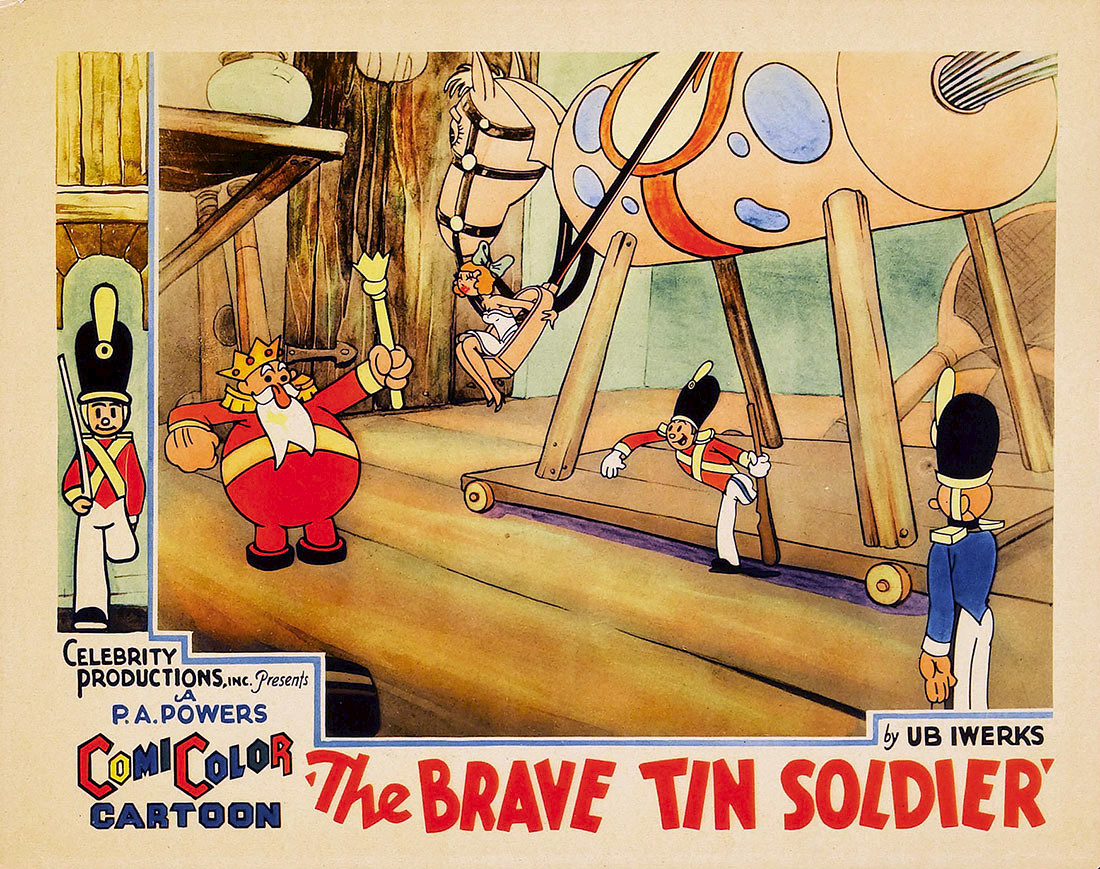
Lobby card

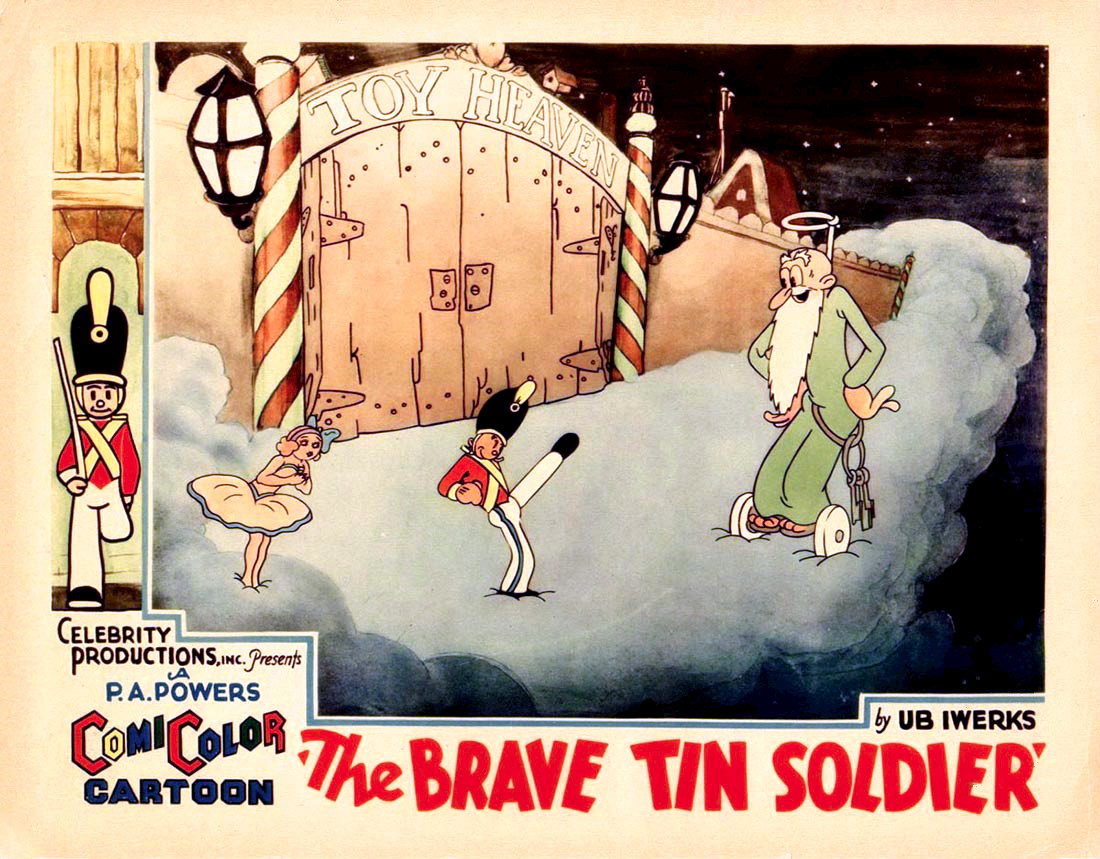
Lobby card
