= Fred Walton =

Fred Walton may refer to:

- Fred Walton (actor) (1865–1936), English-American actor
- Fred Walton (filmmaker), American film director and screenwriter
