= She Wolves =

1925 film

- Directed by: Maurice Elvey
- Screenplay by: Dorothy Yost
- Based on: The Man in Evening Clothes by: André Picard; Yves Mirande
- Starring: Alma Rubens; Jack Mulhall; Bertram Grassby; Harry Myers; Judy King; Fred Walton
- Production company: Fox Film Corporation
- Distributed by: Fox Film Corporation
- Release date: April 26, 1925
- Running time: 60 minutes
- Country: United States
- Language: Silent (English intertitles)

She Wolves is a lost 1925 American silent drama film directed by Maurice Elvey and written by Dorothy Yost. It is based on the 1924 play The Man in Evening Clothes by André Picard and Yves Mirande. The film stars Alma Rubens, Jack Mulhall, Bertram Grassby, Harry Myers, Judy King, and Fred Walton. The film was released on April 26, 1925, by Fox Film Corporation.

== Plot ==
As described in a film magazine review, after a young couple becomes married, the wife becomes deeply chagrined because the husband does not dress and appears with all the care and well-groomed clothes she believes he should have. He decides to leave her. In Paris, he spends so much on clothes he becomes bankrupt. She learns to appreciate him, and there is a reconciliation after.

== Cast ==
- Alma Rubens as Germaine D'Artois
- Jack Mulhall as Lucien D'Artois
- Bertram Grassby as André Delandal
- Harry Myers as Henri de Latour
- Judy King as Fox Trot
- Fred Walton as Valet
- Diana Miller as Céleste
- Josef Swickard as De Goncourt
- Helen Dunbar as Madame De Goncourt
- Charles Clary as D'Artois
