= Tin soldier =

Miniature toy soldiers

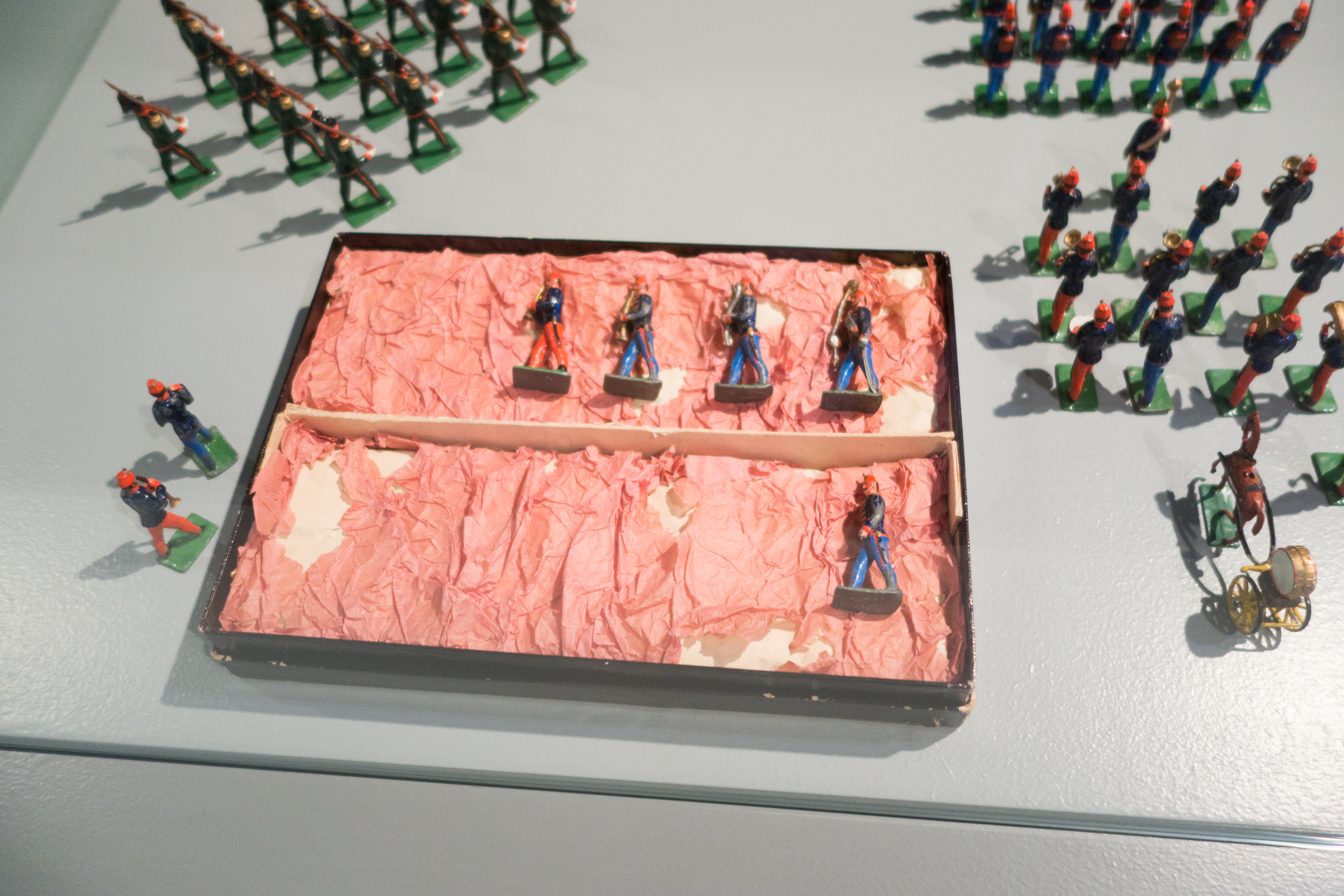
Tin soldiers portraying a military band

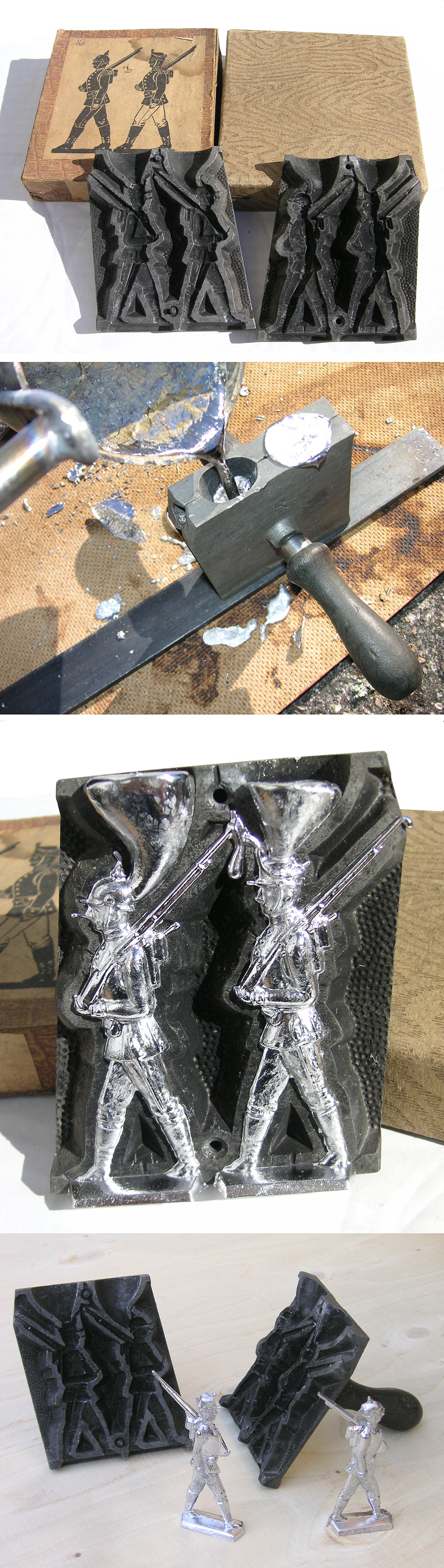
Tin soldiers being cast in German molds from the early 20th century. The two mold halves are clamped together, and the metal (an alloy of tin and lead, heated to approx. 300 °C) is poured into the mold. When the metal has solidified, the mold is cracked open. Sprues (pouring channels) and extraneous flash (metal that has penetrated cracks and air channels in the mold) are seen in the third image, and have been removed from the castings in the last image.

Tin soldiers are miniature toy soldiers that are very popular in the world of collecting. They can be bought finished or in a raw state to be hand-painted. They are generally made of pewter, tin, lead, other metals or plastic. Often very elaborate scale models of battle scenes, known as dioramas, are created for their display. Tin soldiers were originally almost two-dimensional figures, often called "little Eilerts" or "flats". They were the first toy soldiers to be mass-produced. Though largely superseded in popularity from the late 19th century by fully rounded three-dimensional lead figures, these flat tin soldiers continue to be produced.

== History ==
The first mass-produced tin soldiers were made in Germany as a tribute to Frederick the Great during the 18th century. Johann Gottfried Hilpert (1748–1832) and his brother Johann Georg Hilpert (1733–1811) established an early assembly-line in 1775 for soldiers and other figures; female painters applied a single color on each figurine as it was passed around the workshop. Hilpert, living in Nuremberg was probably the first to create them as a mass-produced toy. The world's largest Tin Soldier is located in New Westminster, British Columbia, Canada.

== Casting ==
"Real" tin soldiers, i.e., ones cast from an alloy of tin and lead, can also be home-made. Moulds are available for sale in some hobby shops. Earlier, the moulds were made of metal; currently, they are often made of hard rubber which can stand the temperature of the molten metal, around 250 °C (482 °F).

== Popular culture ==
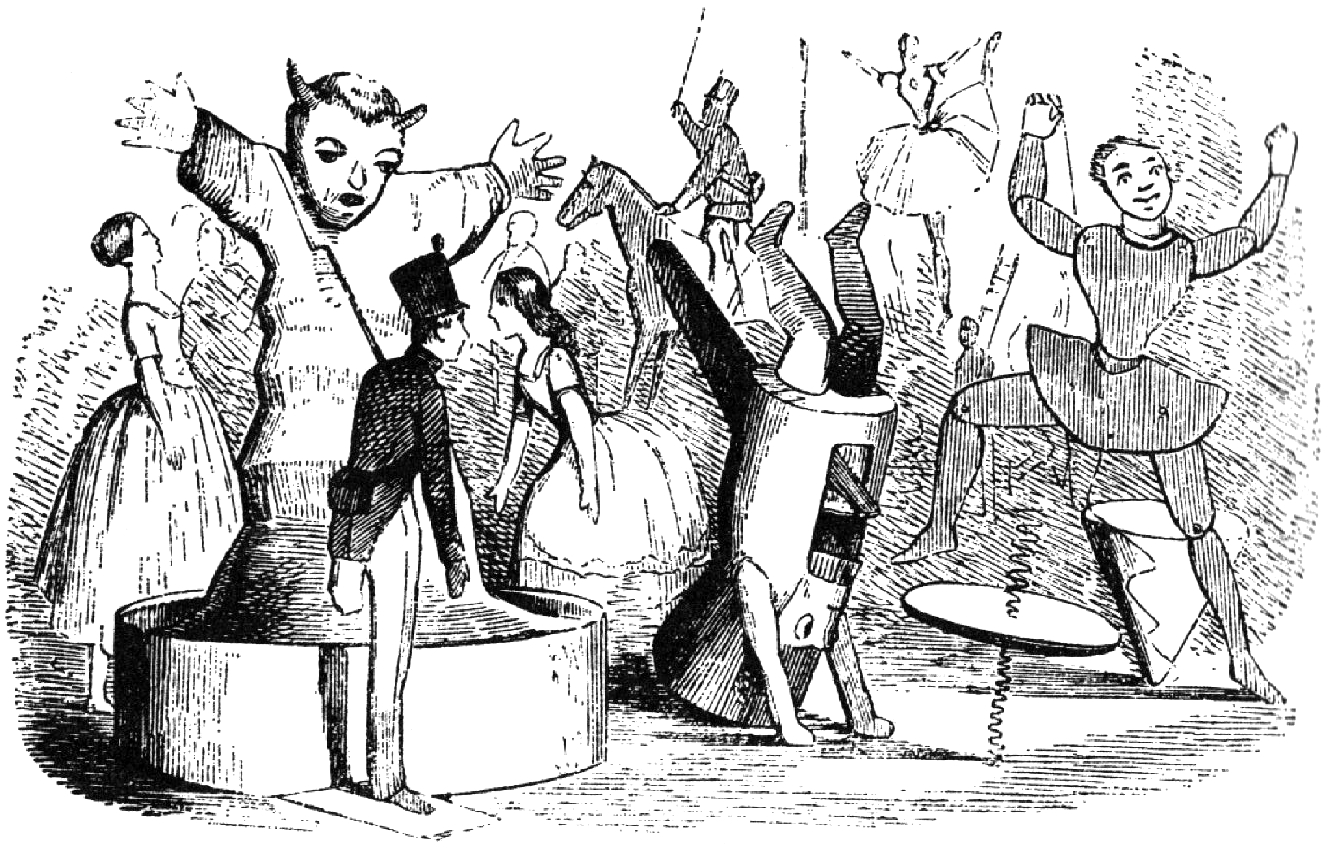
Illustration by Vilhelm Pedersen for The Steadfast Tin Soldier (Den Standhaftige Tinsoldat).

The best-known tin soldier in literature is the unnamed title character in Hans Christian Andersen's 1838 fairy tale The Steadfast Tin Soldier. It concerns a tin soldier who had only one leg because "he had been left to the last, and then there was not enough of the melted tin to finish him." He falls in love with a dancer made of paper and after much adventuring, including being swallowed by a fish, the two are consumed together by fire, leaving nothing but tin melted "in the shape of a little tin heart."

Tin soldiers also play a role in "The Nutcracker Suite" as well as "Knight's Castle" by Edward Eager.

== See also ==
- Army men
- Militaria
- Model figure
- Toy soldier
- The Parade of the Tin Soldiers
