= An Old-Time Nightmare =

1911 American film by Fred Walton

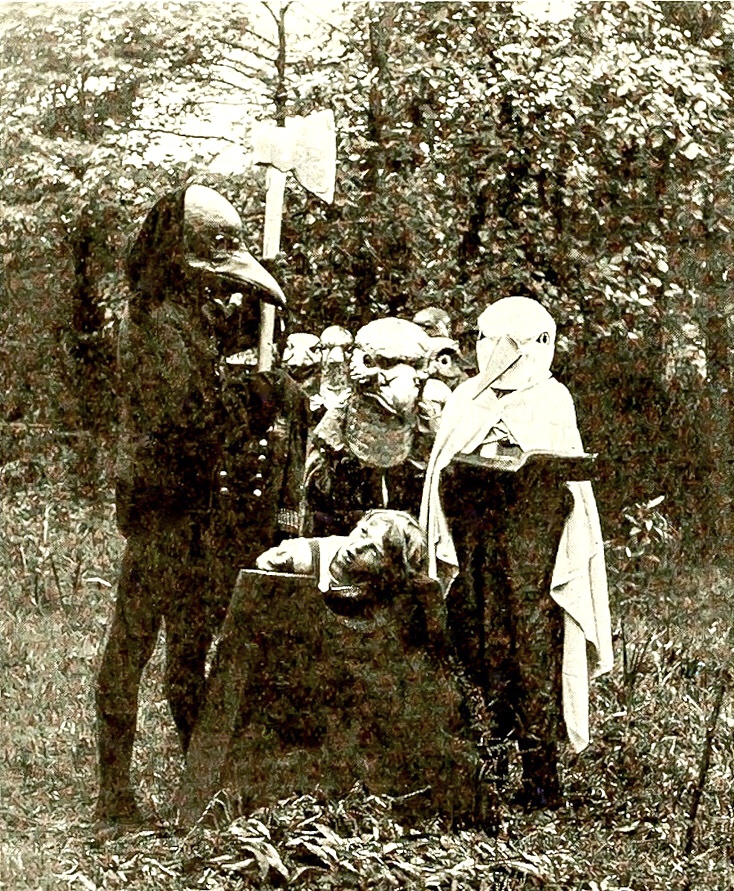
- The boy Tommy prepares to be executed for stealing eggs from a bird's nest
- Directed by: Fred Walton (Note: In some Powers advertisements for this film, it is noted that Fred Walton "produced" the short. During the early silent era, the terms "director" and "producer" were often used interchangeably.)
- Produced by: Patrick Powers
- Starring: Uncredited cast
- Production companies: Powers Moving Picture Company; Nepera Park, Yonkers; New York, U.S.
- Distributed by: Motion Picture Distributors and Sales Company
- Release date: September 19, 1911
- Running time: 7 min (approximately 500 feet)
- Country: United States
- Language: Silent (English intertitles)

An Old-Time Nightmare is a lost 1911 American silent fantasy comedy film. Directed by Fred Walton, the short was released as the latter half of a 1000-foot "split reel", with the first half being another comedy short, Lost in a Hotel. Both films were produced by the Powers Moving Picture Company of New York. This short's performers are not credited in 1911 reviews, in plot summaries, or in advertisements published in trade journals at the time. The faces of most of the cast were not visible on screen, for many of the actors wore costumes with full head coverings sculpted to resemble various species of birds, including a sparrow, eagle, dove, owl, wren, stork, bluebird, robin, linnet, and crow. While the short was identified upon its release as a comedy, it was also characterized in several contemporary reviews as a morality lesson and ideal photoplay for "juvenile" audiences.

== Plot ==
According to reviews in 1911 trade publications, the film began with scenes of a group of boys fishing by a pond in a wooded area known as "Boyland". One of the youngsters brought with him a large serving of pie, which another boy named Tommy steals and runs away from the group. Once he outruns the other boys, Tommy shares the pie with his friend who accompanied him. The pair are tired from running and now do not feel well after devouring the stolen treat, so they lie down next to a big tree and fall asleep. Tommy begins to dream. In a bizarre nightmare he sees himself stealing again, but this time in "Birdland". He is a thief who climbs a tree and robs a bird's nest of its eggs. After taking the eggs, Tommy climbs down and then argues in his dream with his friend. The boys disagree about how to share the eggs, so they leave one another.

Later in his dream, as he walks alone across a cornfield, Tommy is confronted by a huge sparrow that is even larger in size than the boy. The bird accuses him for egg theft and calls an equally large police bird, who arrests Tommy and "jails" him in a large bird cage. A trial before Judge Eagle is then convened to try the boy for his crime. Other human-sized birds assemble in the forest to act as jurors and witnesses in the outdoor court. After the jury quickly finds Tommy guilty, the judge sentences him to be beheaded. A flock of birds now forms a "death march" to escort the condemned boy to the chopping block, where the Crow, Birdland's executioner, is holding a large axe. There, Tommy is forced to place his head on the block, but just before the Crow strikes the fatal blow, Tommy awakens. He finds himself back in the reality of Boyland. His friend is awake too, and says he is hungry again after eating the pie. He suggests that they should find a bird's nest and take some eggs. Tommy refuses. Having gained a new perspective from his nightmare, he vows never again to steal from a nest.

== Cast ==
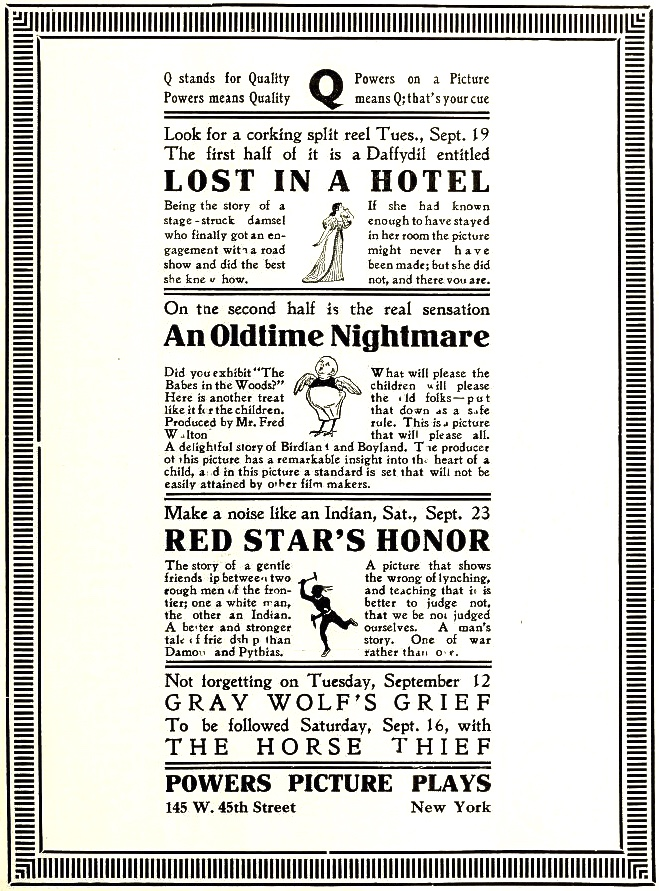
Powers advertisement for the film as second half of split reel (Note: The film's title varies in form in 1911 reviews, release listings, and advertisements. It is chiefly cited as An Old-Time Nightmare but also as An Old-time Nightmare, An Oldtime Nightmare, An Old Time Nightmare, and An Old Nightmare.)

Not one of the performers is credited in reviews of the film, in plot summaries, or in Powers' advertisements for the production published in trade journals and papers in 1911.

- Uncredited child actor as Tommy
- Uncredited child actor as Tommy's Friend
- Uncredited performer as the Sparrow, the victim of egg theft (Note: The bird accusing Tommy of theft is identified as a sparrow in one published summary of the film and as a wren in a story description by another trade journal in 1911.)
- Uncredited performer as the Police Bird of Birdland
- Uncredited performer as Judge Eagle
- Uncredited performers as Bird Jurors
- Uncredited performer as the Minister Dove
- Uncredited performers as Committee of Owls
- Uncredited performer as the Crow, the executioner

== Split-reel release and reception ==
During the silent era, it was common practice for production companies to load two short films onto a single reel, creating what was referred to then as a "split reel". (Note: The "List Of Films And Their Release Dates" in the October 7, 1911 issue of The Billboard provides examples of the frequent use of split reels in film distribution during the early silent era.) Combining films onto one reel not only reduced the number of reels shipped to theaters by distributors, it also reduced the number of reel changes on the projectors at those locations. In September 1911, when Powers Moving Picture Company distributed its split-reel copies of Lost in a Hotel and An Old-Time Nightmare, this comedy-fantasy comprised the latter half of all the shared reels released.

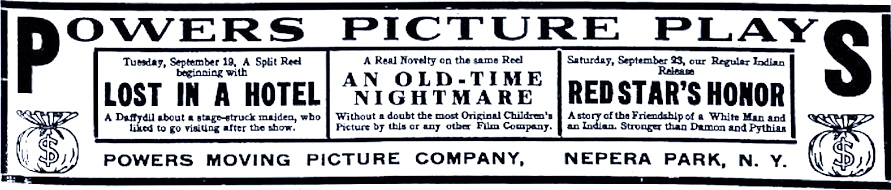
The Billboard, September 16, 1911

The film in 1911 was generally well received by reviewers, who judged it to be an amusing oddity as well as a "worthwhile" screen presentation. Powers itself promoted the release as "Without a doubt the most Original Children's Picture by this or by any other Film Company." The trade journal The Moving Picture World applauded that effort:

Any film that shows an attempt to depart from the beaten path and blaze a trail of its own may be very properly treated as a notable film. Such a film is "An Old Time Nightmare," lately done by the Powers Company. There is a great field for pictures of child life and the supply of them is all too scarce...Juvenile productions have been done before, but we find it incumbent upon us to applaud the novelty of the film in question. It is a story of Birdland. A picture with a distinct lesson and moral for boys who rob birds' nests.

== "Lost" film status ==
No copy of this Powers short is listed among the motion-picture holdings of the Library of Congress, the UCLA Film Archives, in the collection of moving images at the Museum of Modern Art, the George Eastman Museum, the Library and Archives Canada, or in other major film repositories in the United States, Canada, or Europe. The film is therefore presumed to be a lost production.

Powers Moving Picture Company continued producing films as a single, independent studio for only seven months after the release of An Old-Time Nightmare. In May 1912 Powers formally merged with other production companies to form Universal Film Manufacturing Company. Properties of those companies were later consolidated under the ownership of Carl Laemmle and selectively transferred in 1915 to Universal's new, burgeoning studio complex in Universal City, California. If any master negatives and prints of this film and others by Powers were later physically transferred to Universal, that footage may have been lost in devastating fires that often occurred throughout the motion-picture industry in the silent era, including at Universal. At any given time, many millions of feet of old and new films that had been shot on unstable, highly flammable cellulose nitrate stock were stored in film vaults and in various studio warehouses. (Note: The year 1922 provides examples of the scope of the film industry's losses to fires. In that year alone, Universal Pictures lost over 1,285,000 feet of film in just two fires: "Blast Rocks Universal City...Films Worth Half-Million Are Total Loss" (185,000 feet destroyed), Los Angeles Times, May 25, 1922, p. II1; "Movie Films Burned at Universal City...Destroys 1,100,000 Feet of Pictures", The New York Times, December 24, 1922, p. 13. ProQuest.) It is more likely, however, that subsequent studio managers deemed this short and its split-reel companion Lost in a Hotel to be inconsequential releases by a short-lived, secondary production company and were discarded or perhaps were simply left unattended and allowed to decay and disintegrate over time.
