= The Steadfast Tin Soldier =

- Short story by Hans Christian Andersen
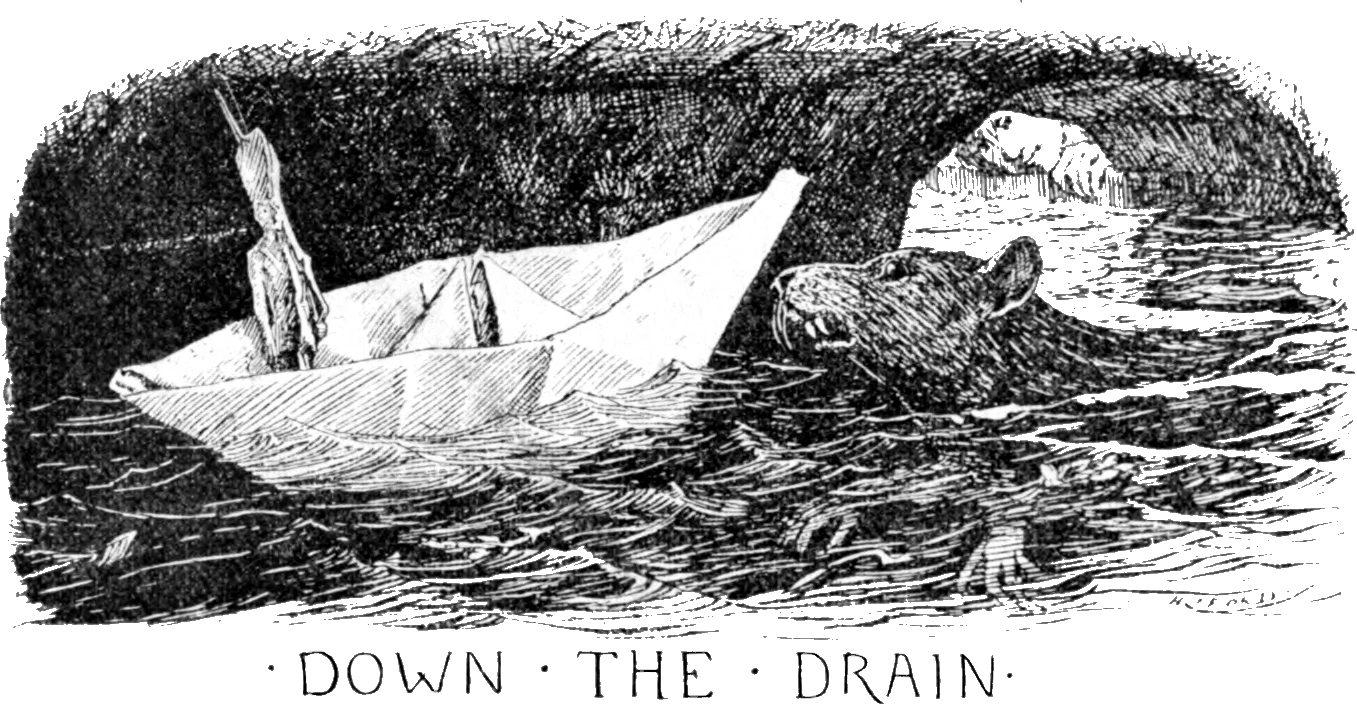
- Illustration from The Yellow Fairy Book (1894)
- Original title: Den Standhaftige Tinsoldat
- Country: Denmark
- Language: Danish
- Genre: Literary fairy tale

Publication
- Published in: Fairy Tales Told for Children. First Collection. First Booklet (Eventyr, fortalte for Børn. Ny Samling. Første Hefte)
- Publication type: Fairy tale collection
- Publisher: C.A. Reitzel
- Media type: Print
- Publication date: 2 October 1838

Chronology
The Daisy	The Wild Swans

"The Steadfast Tin Soldier" (Danish: Den standhaftige tinsoldat) is a literary fairy tale by Hans Christian Andersen about a tin soldier's love for a paper ballerina. The tale was first published in Copenhagen by C.A. Reitzel on 2 October 1838 in the first booklet of Fairy Tales Told for Children. First Collection. The booklet consists of Andersen's "The Daisy" and "The Wild Swans". The tale was Andersen's first not based upon a folk tale or a literary model. "The Steadfast Tin Soldier" has been adapted to various media including ballet and animated film.

== Plot ==
On his birthday, a boy receives a set of 25 tin soldiers all cast from one old tin spoon and arrays them on a table top. One soldier stands on a single leg because, as he was the last one cast, there was not enough metal to make him whole. Nearby, the soldier spies a pretty paper ballerina with a spangle on her sash. She, too, is standing on one leg, and the soldier falls in love. That night, a goblin among the toys in the form of a jack-in-the-box, who also loves the ballerina, angrily warns the soldier to take his eyes off her, but the soldier ignores him.

The next day, the soldier falls from a windowsill (presumably the work of the goblin) and lands in the street. Two boys find the soldier, place him in a paper boat, and set him sailing in the gutter. The boat and its passenger wash into a storm drain, where a rat demands the soldier pay a toll.

Sailing on, the boat is washed into a canal, where the tin soldier is swallowed by a fish. When this fish is caught and cut open, the tin soldier finds himself once again on the table top before the ballerina. Inexplicably, the boy throws the tin soldier into the fire, which is most likely the work of the jack-in-the-box goblin. A wind blows the ballerina into the fire with him; she is consumed by it. The maid cleans the fireplace in the morning and finds that the soldier has melted into a little tin heart, along with the ballerina's spangle, which is now burned as black as coal.

== Publication ==
The tale was first published in Copenhagen, Denmark by C. A. Reitzel on 2 October 1838 in Fairy Tales Told for Children. First Collection. First Booklet. Other tales in the booklet include "The Daisy" and "The Wild Swans". The tale was republished in collected editions of Andersen's work, first, on 18 December 1849 in Fairy Tales and again on 15 December 1862 in the first volume of Fairy Tales and Stories.

== Adaptations ==
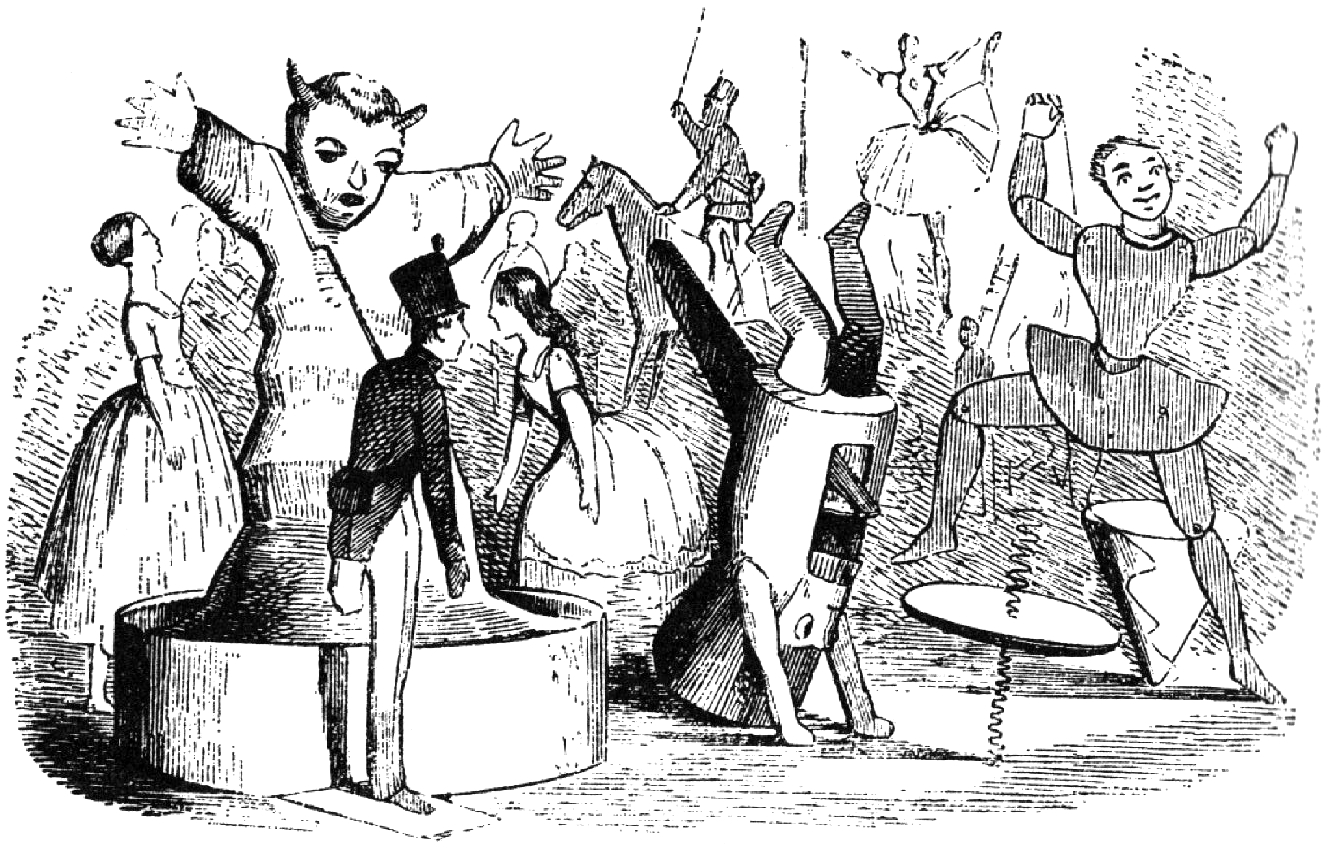
Illustration by Vilhelm Pedersen, Andersen's first illustrator (1850)

- Ub Iwerks did a 1934 Cinecolor cartoon based on the story entitled "The Brave Tin Soldier". The cartoon's plot is different from the original story. The antagonist is not a Jack-in-the-Box, but rather a toy king who wants the ballerina for himself. The tin soldier attacks the king, and as a result is put on trial and sentenced to death via firing squad. The ballerina pleads for his life to be spared, but her pleas are ignored. She then stands alongside the tin soldier and both are shot into a burning fireplace, where he melts into the shape of a heart with her. In the cartoon's ending, both the tin soldier and ballerina are sent to "Toy Heaven", where the tin soldier now has both legs.
- A shortened version of the tale was planned for the 1940 Disney animated film Fantasia, as indicated by 1938 storyboards, but the ending of the segment did not satisfy Walt Disney and the story was set aside.
- George Pal's war-themed 1941 Puppetoon, "Rhythm in the Ranks", is likely a loose adaptation of Andersen's story, with a toy soldier getting discharged after falling in love with an ice-skating ballerina.
- Paul Grimault (with Jacques Prévert) did a 1947 colour French cartoon Le Petit Soldat that portrayed the title character as a toy acrobat who is called to war and returns injured but determined to rescue his ballerina.
- Marcia Brown's 1953 picture book illustrating M. R. James's translation of the story was awarded a Caldecott Honor.
- Ivo Caprino's 1955 puppet movie "The Steadfast Tin Soldier".
- In 1971, the Japanese anime anthology series Andersen Monogatari made an episode adaptation.
- Andersen's contemporary August Bournonville choreographed the tale for his ballet A Fairy Tale in Pictures, and George Balanchine choreographed the tale in 1975, allowing the soldier and the ballerina to express their love before the ballerina is blown into the fire. Georges Bizet set the tale to music in Jeux d'Enfants.
- In 1976, Soyuzmultfilm made an animated adaptation.
- A live-action musical adaptation was the second of four episodes of The Enchanted Musical Playhouse that originally aired from 1984 to 1985 on the (then) brand new Disney Channel.
- In 1985, Harmony Gold made an English dub of a 1980s Italian adaptation of the story, The Little Train.
- In 1986, Atkinson Film-Arts made an animated adaptation featuring the voices of Rick Jones, Terrence Scammell, and Robert Bockstael, with narration by Christopher Plummer.
- In 1989, Studio Miniatur Filmowych made an animated adaptation.
- In 1991, it was adapted into an animated television movie as part of Timeless Tales from Hallmark, which was produced by Hanna-Barbera and Hallmark. It featured the voices of George Newbern as the Tin Soldier, Megan Mullally as the Ballerina, Tim Curry as the Jack-in-the-box and Paul Williams as a frog named Frogbauten.
- Children's author Tor Seidler adapted the book in 1992, with illustrations by Fred Marcellino.
- In 1995, Jon Voight directed and appeared in The Tin Soldier, a Showtime family film loosely based on Andersen's story.
- In 1996, Vivian Little and Kathleen Mills adapted Anderson's story into a full-length ballet for the Dance Fremont studio in Seattle. The ballet is still produced every winter, as an alternative to the popular Christmas ballet The Nutcracker, which many American studios produce in December. Dance Fremont centers the story around a young deaf boy who receives the toys for Christmas, and uses Signed Exact English for all dialogue.
- In the 2000 Disney animated film Fantasia 2000, an adaptation of the tale is set to the first movement of the Piano Concerto No. 2 in F Major by Dmitri Shostakovich. The segment differs from Andersen's tale: there are only five soldiers, but still only one with one leg; the ballerina appears to be made of porcelain; the soldier is disappointed to discover the ballerina has two legs, but the ballerina still accepts him; at the end, the jack-in-the-box villain is the one that perishes in the fire instead of the soldier and ballerina who both remain in one piece.
- In 2002, the series The Fairytaler adapted it in the story "The Hardy Tin Soldier".
- In Stieg Larsson's 2006 thriller The Girl Who Played with Fire, the fiercely independent protagonist Lisbeth Salander compares the journalist Mikael Blomkvist, who had stayed loyal to her despite her repeated blatant rejection of him, with Andersen's steadfast tin soldier (implicitly comparing herself with Andersen's ballerina).
- Mike Mignola's graphic novel Baltimore, or The Steadfast Tin Soldier and the Vampire uses the motif of the tin soldier of Andersen's fairy tale to represent the eponymous protagonist, a World War I veteran and vampire hunter who lost his leg. Kate DiCamillo's The Miraculous Journey of Edward Tulane (2006) makes use of the tale's themes.
- The fairytale is interpolated in the music video of Daft Punk's and Julian Casablancas' song "Instant Crush".
- Genshin Impact incorporated this into Scaramouche’s 2022 character teaser.
