= First Death in Nova Scotia =

1965 poem by Elizabeth Bishop

- by Elizabeth Bishop
- Country: United States
- Language: English
- Subject: Death
- Genre: Poetry
- Publisher: Farrar, Straus and Giroux
- Publication date: 1965
- Media type: Print

"First Death in Nova Scotia" is a short poem by Elizabeth Bishop (1911-1979) published by Farrar, Straus and Giroux in Questions of Travel (1965). The poem tells of a child's first experience of death in the context of a relative's wake.

== Summary ==
A young child is taken into a parlor on a winter day to view her deceased cousin Arthur who is laid out in a coffin resembling a "little frosted cake". The child notes a stuffed loon standing on a marble-topped table eyeing the casket and chromolithographs of British royalty in ermine trains hung above the deceased. The child is given a lily of the valley and lifted by her mother to place the flower in dead Arthur's hand. The child notes, and makes an allusion to Jack Frost, who has painted Arthur's red hair with a bit of "white paint". The child also tells us that the royals have invited Arthur to be "the smallest page at court". The child wonders how Arthur will ever go to court because "his eyes are shut up so tight" and the roads are "deep in snow".

== Background and publication history ==
Bishop was born in Worcester, Massachusetts in 1911, and, following the death of her father and the institutionalization of her mother, was passed from one relative to another. Her earliest years were spent on the coast of Nova Scotia. At Vassar, she decided to make poetry her life's work after meeting Marianne Moore. Bishop once said:

Have you ever noticed how you can learn more about other people-more about how they feel, how it would feel to be them-by hearing them cough or make one of those inner noises, than by watching them for hours? Sometimes if another person hiccups, particularly if you haven't been paying much attention to him, why do you get a sudden sensation as if you were inside him-you know how he feels in the little aspects he never mentions, aspects which are, really, indescribable to another person and must be realized by that kind of intuition. Do you know what I am driving at? Well ... that's what I quite often want to get into poetry.

"First Death in Nova Scotia" was first published by Farrar, Straus, and Giroux in Questions of Travel in 1965, and published in The Complete Poems in 1969.

== Critique ==
Jack Coulehan writes that "First Death" has its source in Bishop's childhood years on Nova Scotia with relatives and that "[t]he imaginative perception here is exquisite". Coulehan explains that the child reconciles her perceptions of a fantastic afterlife (dwelling at court as a page) with the reality of the dead child and the dead loon before her: "Maybe the dead don't go anywhere," Coulehan writes, "Maybe the dead are just dead."

== See also ==
- Literature of Nova Scotia
