= ComiColor Cartoon =

American animated film series

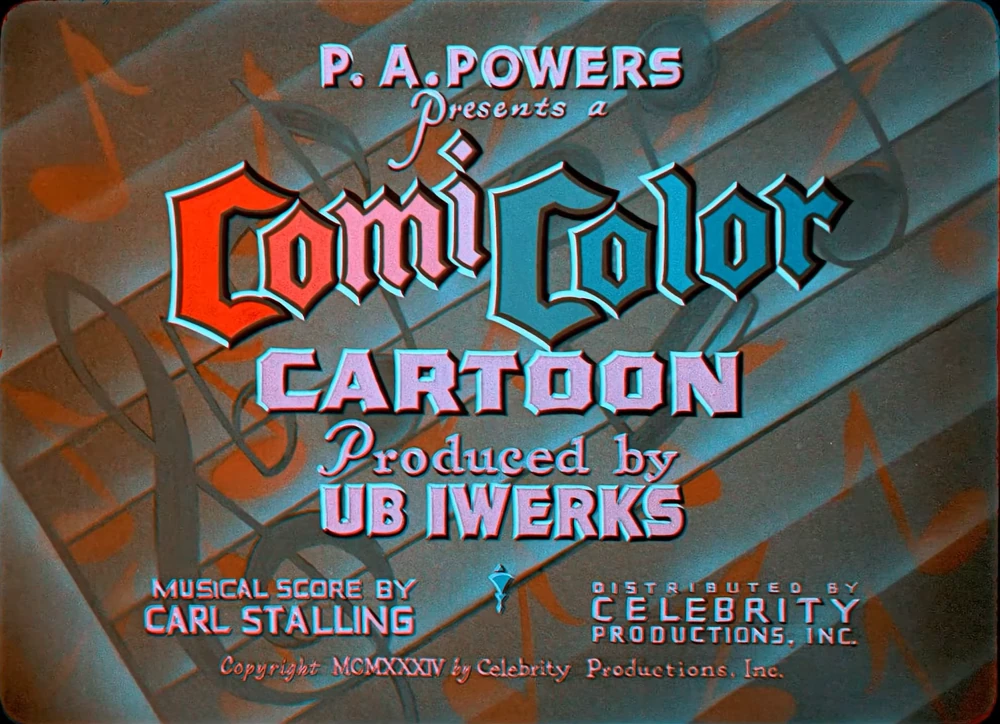
- The title card of "Jack Frost" (1934), featuring the series logo.
- Directed by: Ub Iwerks; Shamus Culhane; Al Eugster; Grim Natwick; Berny Wolf
- Produced by: Ub Iwerks; Pat Powers
- Music by: Carl Stalling; Art Turkisher
- Color process: Cinecolor
- Production company: Animated Pictures
- Distributed by: Celebrity Productions
- Running time: 6 — 7 minutes
- Country: United States
- Language: English

ComiColor Cartoon is a series of twenty-five animated short subjects produced by Ub Iwerks from 1933 to 1936. This cartoon series was the last produced by Iwerks' studio, Animated Pictures, under the studio's main financial backer who handled distribution rights of the films, Celebrity Pictures. The cartoons were all photographed exclusively in Cinecolor.

Most of the ComiColor entries were based upon popular fairy tales and other familiar stories, including Jack and the Beanstalk, Old Mother Hubbard, The Bremen Town Musicians, and The Headless Horseman.

== Production ==
Animated Pictures, the studio run by ex-Walt Disney Productions director and Mickey Mouse co-creator Ub Iwerks, had been producing black-and-white Flip the Frog cartoons for a contract with Metro-Goldwyn-Mayer since 1930 with extensive financial backing from Pat Powers, who was also formerly associated with Disney, through Powers' own company, Celebrity Productions. As early as June 1934, Iwerks' studio announced plans for two new series: one a black-and-white series of cartoons featuring Willie Whopper, as an extension with their MGM deal, and the other an all-color series of ComiColor cartoons.

Walt Disney had an exclusive contract with Technicolor for use of their three-strip process for his studio's short cartoons, so other studios had to opt for different color processes, which particularly used only two strips of color and resulted in more limited palettes. The ComiColor cartoons were shot with the cheaper Cinecolor process, a process which used two red-orange and green-blue strips of film for color. As a result of extensive financial backing from Pat Powers, the cartoons' soundtracks were recorded with Powers' Cinephone system. A number of the shorts were filmed using Iwerks' early attempt at a multiplane camera, which he built himself from the remains of a Chevrolet automobile. Several shorts also utilized the technique of rotoscoping, a process where animation is drawn over live-action footage. Circus performer Wellington Mack served as a live-action reference for such sequences.

Staff was enlarged and Iwerks' Beverly Hills studio expanded to accommodate the increased production. In the beginning, James Culhane and Al Eugster, animators hired from Fleischer Studios, were appointed as the series' lead animators and directors, while Grim Natwick and Berny Wolf, two other ex-Fleischer animators, directed most entries in the Willie Whopper series. Culhane and Eugster fulfilled the role for at least four credited ComiColor films. Iwerks' deal with MGM ended on the Willie cartoons in 1934, with Culhane leaving for a directorial job offer at The Van Beuren Corporation soon after. With the ComiColor cartoons as Iwerks' remaining series, Grim Natwick was subsequently credited as lead animator in two cartoons, Aladdin and the Wonderful Lamp and The Valiant Tailor, and he contributed to the series until he resigned from the studio later that year, taking up a job offer to animate for Walt Disney on his first feature, Snow White and the Seven Dwarfs.

With no distribution deals from larger studios like MGM for the ComiColor series, distribution duties of the cartoons were provided directly by the studio's parent company Celebrity Productions. Distribution rights for the series were sold to multiple smaller production companies based on state and location, organizations including Allied Pictures Corporation in Los Angeles and San Francisco, Gold Medal Film Company in Philadelphia and Washington, D.C., and Principal Film Exchange in New York City, among many others.

== Aftermath ==
Pat Powers continued distributing these cartoons even after financially backing out of Iwerks' studio. In the 1940s, the ComiColor cartoons received home-movie distribution through Castle Films, releasing the cartoons in Cinecolor. Blackhawk Films continued releasing them for home film use in the 1970s, but this time using conventional Eastmancolor film stock.

Copyrights were not renewed on most of the ComiColor cartoons, and fell into the public domain in the United States. As a result, they are widely available on a variety of physical and digital media. Copyrighted cartoons are otherwise owned by Blackhawk Films. Steve Stanchfield of Thunderbean plans on releasing the restored versions of the shorts across two Blu-ray sets called ComiColor Cartoons Collection V.1 & 2.

== Filmography ==
No.	Title	Release Date	Director(s)	Film (If In The Public Domain)	Notes
1	Jack and the Beanstalk	November 25, 1933	Shamus Culhane, AI Eugster, & Ub Iwerks	Copyright renewed.	The first ComiColor cartoon.
2	The Little Red Hen	February 17, 1934	Shamus Culhane, AI Eugster, & Ub Iwerks	Copyright renewed.	
3	The Brave Tin Soldier	April 7, 1934	Shamus Culhane, AI Eugster, & Ub Iwerks	Copyright renewed.	
4	Puss in Boots	May 19, 1934	Shamus Culhane, AI Eugster, & Ub Iwerks	Copyright renewed.	
5	The Queen of Hearts	June 22, 1934	Shamus Culhane, AI Eugster, & Ub Iwerks	Copyright renewed.	Retitled to “Queen of Hearts” by Castle Films for home use.
6	Aladdin and the Wonderful Lamp	August 10, 1934	Shamus Culhane & Ub Iwerks	Copyright renewed.	Retitled to “Aladdin’s Lamp” by Castle Films for home use.
7	The Headless Horseman	September 29, 1934	Shamus Culhane, Al Eugster, & Ub Iwerks	Copyright renewed.	
8	The Valiant Tailor	October 27, 1934	Shamus Culhane, Al Eugster, & Ub Iwerks		Retitled to “The King’s Tailor” by Castle Films for home use.
9	Don Quixote	November 24, 1934	Shamus Culhane, Al Eugster, & Ub Iwerks	Copyright renewed.	
10	Jack Frost	December 22, 1934	Shamus Culhane, Al Eugster, & Ub Iwerks		
11	Little Black Sambo	February 2, 1935	Shamus Culhane, Al Eugster, & Ub Iwerks	Home Movie Release.	
12	The Bremen Town Musicians	March 2, 1935	Shamus Culhane, Al Eugster, & Ub Iwerks		
13	Old Mother Hubbard	March 30, 1935	Shamus Culhane, Al Eugster, & Ub Iwerks		
14	Mary's Little Lamb	April 27, 1935	Shamus Culhane, Al Eugster, & Ub Iwerks		
15	Summertime	June 15, 1935	Shamus Culhane, Al Eugster, & Ub Iwerks		
16	Sinbad the Sailor	July 26, 1935	Shamus Culhane, Al Eugster, & Ub Iwerks		
17	The Three Bears	August 30, 1935	Shamus Culhane, Al Eugster, & Ub Iwerks		
18	Balloon Land	September 30, 1935	Ub Iwerks		Retitled to “The Pincushion Man” by Castle Films for home use.
19	Simple Simon	November 15, 1935	Ub Iwerks		
20	Humpty Dumpty	December 27, 1935	Al Eugster & Ub Iwerks		
21	Ali Baba	January 31, 1936	Shamus Culhane, Al Eugster, & Ub Iwerks		
22	Tom Thumb	March 27, 1936	Ub Iwerks		
23	Dick Whittington's Cat	May 29, 1936	Ub Iwerks		
24	Little Boy Blue	July 31, 1936	Ub Iwerks	Pitch Restored	Retitled to “The Big Bad Wolf” by Castle Films for home use.
25	Happy Days	September 25, 1936	Ub Iwerks	Final ComiColor Cartoon	The last ComiColor cartoon. Was mean’t to become its own cartoon series but got cancelled.

== See also ==
- Golden Age of American animation
- Animated Pictures Corp.
- Color Classics
- Color Rhapsody
- Happy Harmonies
- Rainbow Parade
- Silly Symphonies
- Merrie Melodies

== Sources ==
- Barrier, Michael (1999). Hollywood Cartoons: American Animation in its Golden Age. 198 Madison Avenue, New York, New York 10016: Oxford University Press. ISBN 978-0-19-516729-0.
- Culhane, Shamus (1986). Talking Animals and Other People (1st ed.). New York: St. Martin's Press. ISBN 0-312-78473-2.
- Leslie Iwerks and John Kenworthy, The Hand Behind the Mouse (Disney Editions, 2001) and documentary of the same name (DVD, 1999)
- Jeff Lenburg, The Great Cartoon Directors (Da Capo Press, 1993)
