= Fred Walton (actor) =

British actor

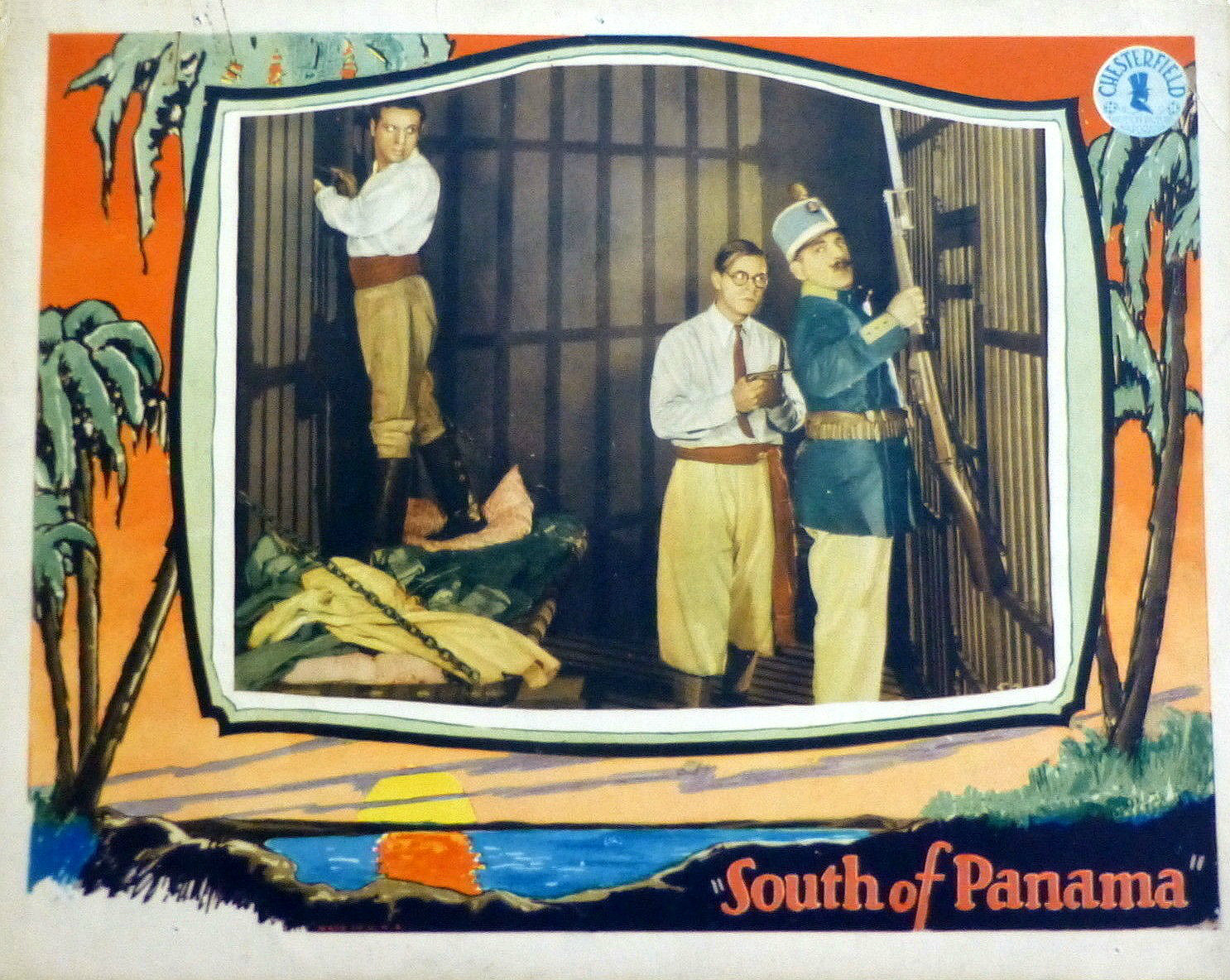
- Lobby card from South of Panama (1928) with Fred Walton at right
- Born: Frederick Heming; 26 July 1865; Brighton, East Sussex, England
- Died: 28 December 1936 (aged 71); London, England
- Occupations: Actor, director
- Years active: 1905-1936

Fred Walton (July 26, 1865 – December 28, 1936) was an English stage actor who immigrated to the United States in the early part of the 20th century and became a character actor and director in American silent and early sound films.

== Life and career ==
Born on 26 July 1865 in Brighton, England, he appeared on the stage in England prior to moving to the United States. In 1905 he appeared in a production of The Babes and the Baron, which ran at the Theatre Royal in Birmingham. The following year, the play was produced by Lee and J.J. Shubert at the Lyric Theatre in New York City, where Walton reprised his role as The Toy Soldier. He remained in the United States, and in 1910 and 1911 he starred in several film shorts, for the Selig Polyscope Company in Chicago and for the Powers Moving Picture Company, a New York studio that in 1912 merged with Independent Moving Pictures. Walton also directed at least two shorts in 1911: April Fool for Edison Studios and the comedy-fantasy production An Old-Time Nightmare for Powers.

In 1911, he would focus on his stage career, during which he appeared in over a dozen plays on Broadway between 1911 and 1922, before returning to the screen in 1924 to perform in The Fast Set. Over the next 12 years, Walton would appear in over 40 films, mostly in supporting or smaller roles. Some of the more notable films in which Walton acted include: Sin Takes a Holiday, starring Constance Bennett, Kenneth MacKenna, and Basil Rathbone; the 1935 Frank Capra classic romantic comedy It Happened One Night, starring Clark Gable and Claudette Colbert; and Little Lord Fauntleroy in 1936, starring Freddie Bartholomew, Dolores Costello Barrymore, and C. Aubrey Smith. He would make his final Broadway appearance in the role of Chester Biddlesby in the Jerome Kern and Otto Harbach musical The Cat and the Fiddle, which ran for almost 400 performances in 1931 and 1932. Walton's final screen performance was in 1936, in the Tyrone Power vehicle Lloyd's of London, which also starred Freddie Bartholomew and C. Aubrey Smith.

Walton died on 28 December 1936, just two months after his last film, Lloyd's of London finished production, and only a month after its premiere in November. He was buried in London.

== Filmography ==
(Most of the following films are listed in the catalog AFI database)

- The Hall-Room Boys (1910)
- An Old-Time Nightmare (1911)
- The Fast Set (1924)
- Marriage in Transit (1925)
- New Brooms (1925)
- She Wolves (1925)
- The City (1926)
- The Splendid Crime (1926)
- 30 Below Zero (1926)
- Almost Human (1927)
- His Dog (1927)
- The Little Adventuress (1927)
- The Wise Wife (1927)
- The House of Shame (1928)
- South of Panama (1928)
- Below the Deadline (1929)
- Circumstantial Evidence (1929)
- Dynamite (1929)
- The Last Dance (1930)
- Sin Takes a Holiday (1930)
- The Big Gamble (1931)
- Kiki (1931)
- The Cat's-Paw (1934)
- Name the Woman (1934)
- Broadway Bill (1934)
- British Agent (1934)
- It Happened One Night (1934)
- Father Brown, Detective (1934)
- The Moonstone (1934)
- Black Moon (1934)
- A Feather in Her Hat (1935)
- Vagabond Lady (1935)
- Two Sinners (1935)
- Forbidden Heaven (1935)
- Behind the Evidence (1935)
- Dangerous Intrigue (1936)
- The White Angel (1936)
- The Big Country (1936)
- Little Lord Fauntleroy (1936)
- The Story of Louis Pasteur (1936)
- Dracula's Daughter (1936)
- The House of a Thousand Candles (1936)
- Lloyd's of London (1937)
