= Sunlit Nights Land Cruises =

Former Swedish luxury train service

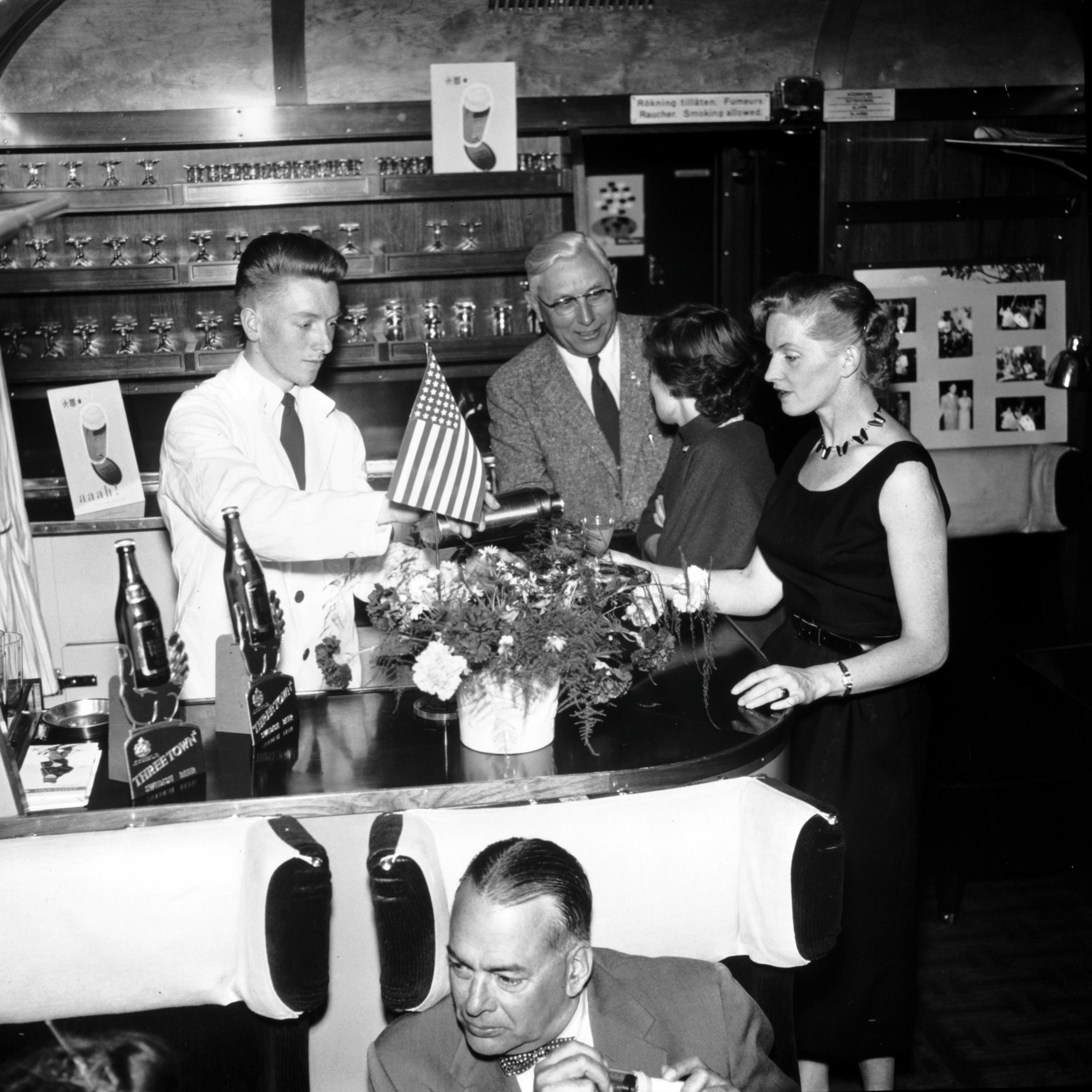
Interior of SNLC bar carriage in 1957

Sunlit Nights Land Cruises (also known as Dollartåget, 'the Dollar Train') was a luxury train service operated by Swedish State Railways from 1950 to 1969. It ran from Stockholm Central Station to northern Sweden and was targeted at foreign tourists, primarily Americans. Originally conceived as a method of bringing US dollars to Sweden after World War II, the service was discontinued as demand fell and the need for foreign currency was no longer urgent.

The service saw approx. 7,000 passengers during its twenty-year tenure, out of which about 75% were American tourists.
