= Old Man Winter =

Personification of winter

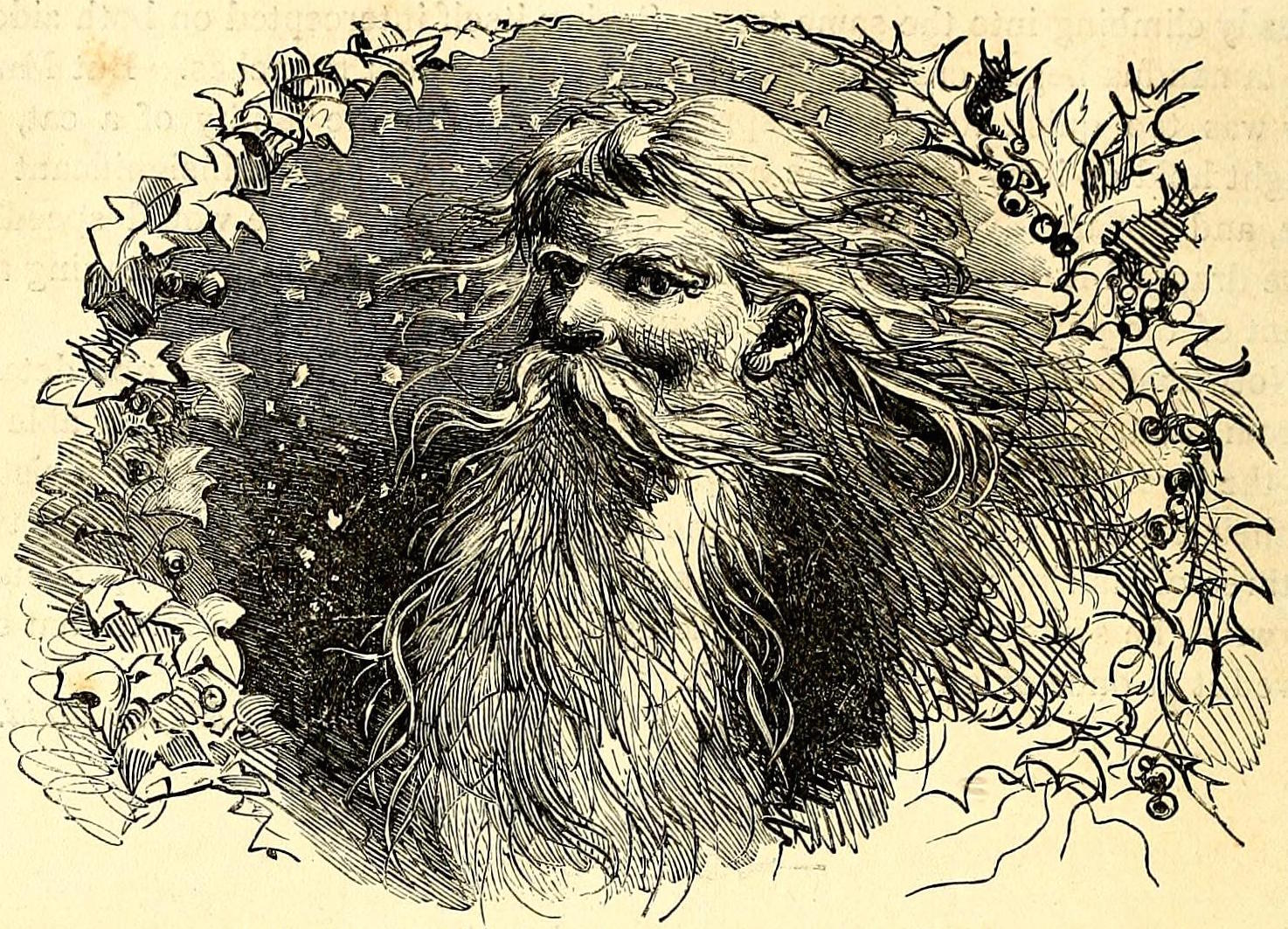
1866 illustration depicting Old Man Winter, originally published alongside a poem by Emily Huntington Miller and later reprinted in a collection edited by John Greenleaf Whittier.

Old Man Winter is a personification of winter. The name is a colloquialism for the winter season derived from ancient Greek mythology and Old World pagan beliefs evolving into modern characters in both literature and popular culture. He is usually depicted as an old man, often blowing winter over the landscape with his breath, or simply freezing the landscape with his very presence.

== History ==
Humans have associated the winter season with deities, e.g., the ancient Greek god of winter Boreas, and in other cultures including Celtic mythology with the goddess Cailleach and goddess Beira. Over time, the old gods of winter changed to new humanizations of the seasons, including Old Man Winter. Among the Potawatomi people of the Western Great Lakes region, there exists a myth about Old Man Winter, called Pondese in their language. Old Man Winter was a character in Haudenosaunee legends.

== Popular culture ==
A caricature of Old Man Winter

=== Literature ===
- Nancy Wood, an American author and poet, included a poem titled "Old Man Winter" in her 1974 collection of poetry and prose called Many Winters

His breath roared out from his lips, Stopping all streams at their source. The feet of Old Man Winter walked upon the earth, freezing all the grass.

— Nancy Wood

- Mabel Powers, an American author, suffragist and feminist, known for collecting and disseminating Native American folklore, included a story titled "How Old Man Winter Was Driven Back" in an anthology of Iroquois stories.
- J. Walter Brain penned a poem entitled "Old Man Winter".

=== Advertising ===
- American Airlines used Old Man Winter in a 1941 ad campaign, touting "Old Man Winter... We like his snow to play in, but it's not all fun... travel above those dark, low-hanging clouds..."
- The Libbey-Owens-Ford Glass Company used Old Man Winter in a World War 2 era ad campaign promoting their new storm windows. The campaign was launched in conjunction with the US Government in an effort to keep domestic fuel consumption low and conserve it for the war effort. "Keep Old Man Winter Out... Keep Warm With Storm Windows!" the ads read.

=== Sports and games ===
- The Old Man Winter Bike Rally and Run is held in February every year in Lyons, Colorado.
- A thoroughbred race horse, born in 2017 and owned by James S. Acquilano, was named Old Man Winter.

=== Music ===
- There is a two part choral octavo called Old Man Winter, written by Lois Brownsey and Marti Lunn Lantz.

=== Television ===
- A version of Old Man Winter named Father Winter appears in Jack Frost, voiced by Paul Frees. He serves as the boss of Jack Frost and his co-workers.
- In The Simpsons episode "Mr. Plow", Abe plays the role of Old Man Winter in the Mr. Plow commercial, where he filled the Simpsons' driveway with snow and then gets beaten up by Homer, aka Mr. Plow.

=== Food and drink ===
- Ribstone Creek Brewery, located in Edgerton, Alberta, Canada, brews a porter by the name of Old Man Winter. This beer won a silver medal in the porter category in the 2020 Canadian Brewing Awards.
- Southern Tier Brewing Company, which originated in Lakewood, New York, US and now has locations in Pennsylvania, North Carolina and Ohio, brews an ale called Old Man Winter.
- Cape Cod Beer, located in Hyannis, Massachusetts, brews an old ale by the name of Old Man Winter.

== See also ==
- Deities and personifications of winter
- Ded Moroz, Russian name for "Old Man Frost"
- Jack Frost, personification of frost, ice, snow, sleet, winter and freezing cold
- Yuki-onna, a "snow woman" spirit in Japanese folklore
