= Pat Powers (producer) =

American producer (1870–1948)

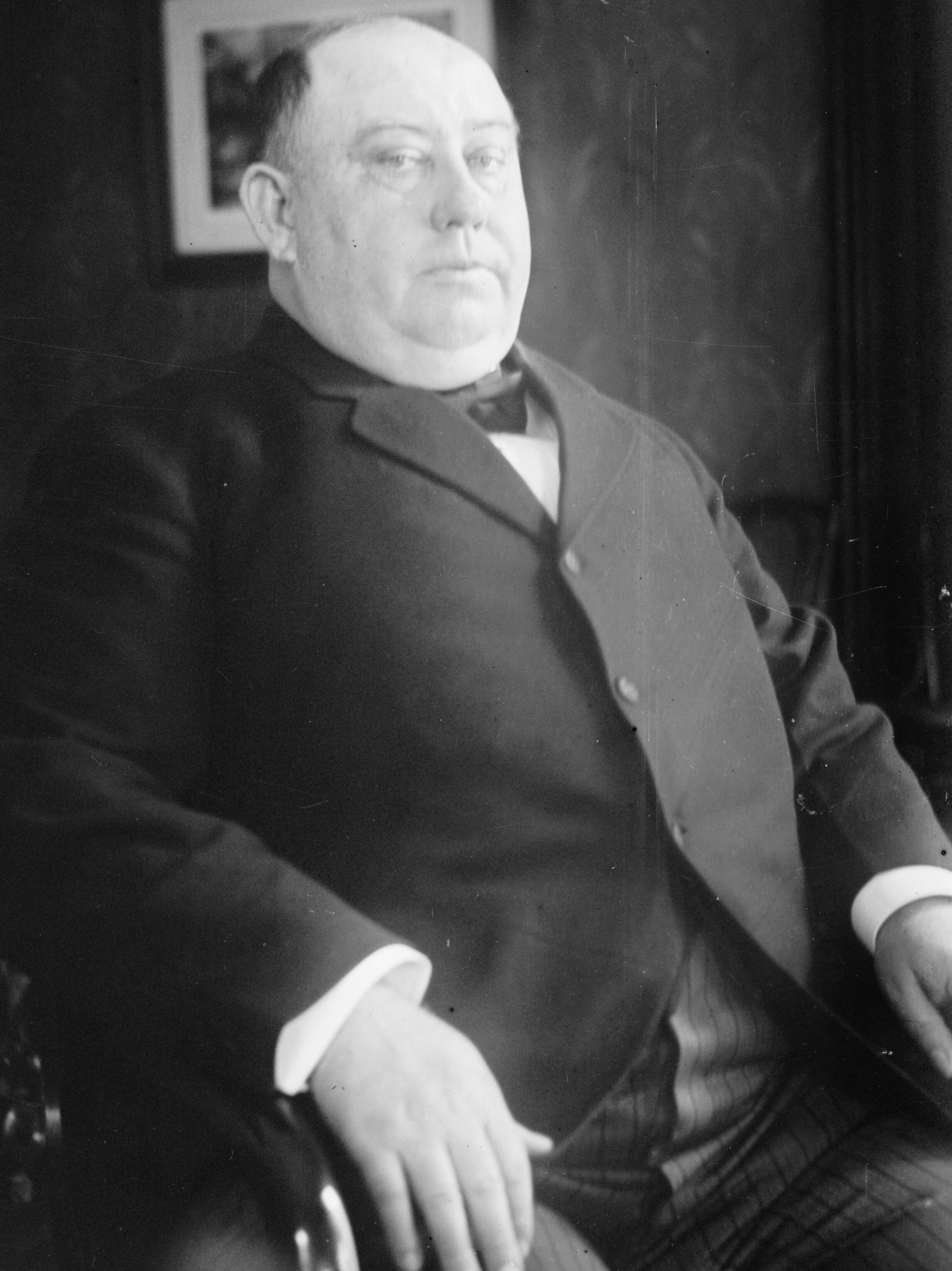
- Born: Patrick Anthony Powers; October 8, 1869; Waterford, Ireland
- Died: July 30, 1948 (aged 78); New York City, U.S.
- Occupations: Movie producer and distributor

Patrick Anthony Powers (October 8, 1869 – July 30, 1948) was an Irish-American producer who was involved in the movie and animation industry from the 1910s to 1930s. He established Powers' Cinephone Moving Picture Company, also known as Powers Picture Plays. His firm, Celebrity Productions, was the first distributor of Walt Disney's Mickey Mouse cartoons (1928–1929). After one year, Disney split with Powers, who started the animation studio Animated Pictures with Disney's lead animator, Ub Iwerks.

== Early career ==
Powers was born in Waterford, Ireland. According to the Buffalo Courier-Express obituary dated August 1, 1948, his sister, Mary Ellen Powers, lived in Buffalo for her entire life.

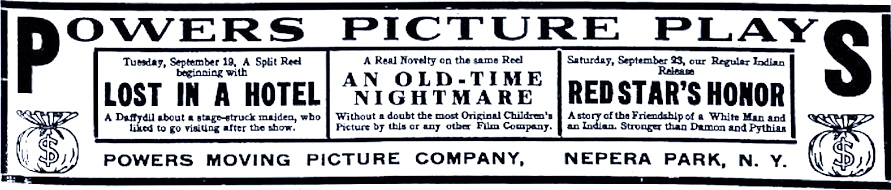
The Billboard, September 16, 1911

Terry Ramsaye, a movie pioneer like Pat Powers, spoke affectionately of his friend: "His first job was as a blacksmith's helper. He was impressed by the amount of labor it involved and immediately gave evidence of executive ability by organizing a union to raise his own pay. He had a flair for politics, too, and presently acquired a less strenuous post with the police department." Ramsaye recalled how entrepreneurial Powers was, quoting Powers's philosophy: "I would rather make 10 dollars in a fast trade than to earn a thousand." Ramsaye concluded, "Pat Powers got what he came over [from Ireland] for -- action, success, and enough controversy to keep him interested."

Powers partnered with Joseph A. Schubert Sr. and sold phonographs from 1900 to 1907, when they formed the Buffalo Film Exchange, 13 Genesee St. which purchased films from producers and rented them to nickelodeons.

In 1910, Powers left Buffalo for New York City, where he founded the Powers Moving Picture Company, also frequently billed in advertisements and credited in his films as "Powers Picture Plays". Early examples of his studio's releases include The Woman Hater (1910) with Violet Heming, Pearl White, and Stuart Holmes; the comedy Lost in a Hotel (1911); the children's fantasy film An Old-Time Nightmare (1911); and the Western Red Star's Honor (1911).

In 1912, Powers's company merged with Carl Laemmle's Independent Moving Pictures Company (IMP) film company and others to create what eventually would become Universal Pictures. He served as treasurer of the Universal Film Manufacturing Company. Later, in 1916 and 1917, Powers introduced a cartoon series titled Fuller Pep, which was similar to Paul Terry's Farmer Al Falfa series. Nine cartoons were produced.

== The 1920s ==
In 1912, Powers had led his own filmmaking company, part of multiple mergers that created Universal Pictures. In 1920, studio president Carl Laemmle and vice president R. H. Cochrane bought out treasurer Powers. As reported by Motion Picture News, "P. A. Powers's other interests are demanding so much of his time that an option on his Universal stock has been given Messrs. Laemmle and Cochrane." Powers left Universal to resume independent production.

The Robertson-Cole production company was reorganized in 1922 as Film Booking Office of America (FBO), and Pat Powers, as one of the company's new American investors, was appointed managing director. The studio was located at the northeast corner of Gower Street and Melrose Avenue, near the future home of Columbia Pictures. Powers was "succeeded as managing director" by Maj. H. C. S. Thomson, "at the instigation of the capital represented in the corporation".

In 1924 Powers turned his attention to purchasing the assets of the defunct Triangle Film Corporation, including approximately 2000 story properties. In 1926, he took over the old William Selig studio and established the new distribution outfit Associated Exhibitors.

In 1928, Joseph P. Kennedy and RCA head David Sarnoff merged FBO and the Keith-Albee-Orpheum theater circuit to form RKO Radio Pictures.

== Powers enters sound-film field ==
Inventor Lee De Forest, a pioneer in adding sound to motion pictures, was on the verge of bankruptcy, due to legal fees from a series of lawsuits against former associates Theodore Case and Freeman Harrison Owens. By the late 1920s De Forest was selling cut-rate sound equipment to second-run movie theaters wanting to convert to sound on the cheap.

Powers invested in what remained of De Forest's Phonofilm company in the spring of 1927. In June 1927, Powers made an unsuccessful takeover bid for the company, and subsequently sued De Forest for $25,000. In the aftermath of the failed takeover, Powers hired a former De Forest technician, William Garity, to replicate the Phonofilm sound recording system, which became Powers Cinephone. By this time, De Forest was in too weak a financial position to mount a legal challenge against Powers for patent infringement.

Powers opened a Cinephone studio for sound-film production in June 1929, on 40th Avenue in Long Island City, New York. His first productions were comedy and novelty shorts with actor-writer Harry Delf, and with burlesque comedians Billy Gilbert and Gene Schuler. The physical plant was very small for a movie studio; surviving Cinephone shorts restrict the camera movement to one cramped soundstage.

== Walt Disney and Ub Iwerks ==
In 1928, Powers licensed the Cinephone process to Walt Disney so that Disney could make sound cartoons such as Mickey Mouse's Steamboat Willie (1928). Unable to find a distributor for the sound cartoons, Disney began releasing his cartoons through Powers's company Celebrity Productions (also known as Celebrity Pictures).

After one year of successful Mickey Mouse and Silly Symphonies cartoons, Walt Disney confronted Powers in 1930 about money due to Disney from the distribution deal. Powers responded by signing Disney's head animator Ub Iwerks to an exclusive deal to create his own animation studio. It was only mildly successful, with cartoon series such as Flip the Frog and Willie Whopper released through Metro-Goldwyn-Mayer, and the ComiColor cartoons released by Powers himself under his Celebrity Pictures banner. Powers withdrew his support from the Iwerks studio in 1936; Iwerks subsisted primarily through subcontracted work for other cartoon studios until he returned to Disney in 1940. As for Disney, he would go on to distribute his cartoons without Powers to Columbia Pictures.

== Later ventures ==
The ComiColor cartoons were the last motion pictures produced by Pat Powers. He then turned his attention to real estate purchases and sales in Connecticut. Powers became a consultant to other producers, including Jerry Fairbanks, and in 1947 he closed Celebrity Productions and established Pat Powers, Inc. on East 46th Street in New York City, with branch offices in Pittsburgh, Pennsylvania and Washington, D. C. "The new firm will serve as consultants in film planning, production, and distribution," reported Movie Makers. "It also plans to serve as a distributor for the home-movie field."

== Legacy ==
In his lifetime, Powers produced nearly 300 movies, most of them early silent films produced at Universal before 1913 or one-reel animated shorts. He is, however, also credited as a producer on Erich von Stroheim's The Wedding March (1928), along with Jesse Lasky and Adolph Zukor. (The latter was a former partner of Mitchell Mark who, like Powers, was a native of Buffalo, New York.)

== Death ==
Patrick Powers, at age 78, died on July 30, 1948, at the Doctors Hospital in New York City after a brief illness. He had two homes, one in Rochester and another in Westport, Connecticut. His obituary also states that he was survived by his sister Mary Ellen and a daughter, Mrs. Roscoe N. George of San Fernando, California. Powers's gravesite is at Holy Cross Cemetery in Lackawanna, New York, near Buffalo.

== Sources ==
- Richard B. Jewell with Vernon Harbin, The RKO Story (New York: Arlington House/Crown, 1982) ISBN 0-517-54656-6
- Betty Lasky, RKO: The Biggest Little Major of Them All (Santa Monica, Calif.: Roundtable, 1989) ISBN 0-915677-41-5
