= 1974 in animation =

Events in 1974 in animation.

== Events ==
=== January ===
- January 6: The first episode of Nippon Animation Heidi, Girl of the Alps is broadcast.
- January 31: The first episode of Vicky the Viking is broadcast.

=== February ===
- February 1: The Peanuts television special It's a Mystery, Charlie Brown premieres on CBS.
- February 12: The first episode of Bagpuss is broadcast.

=== April ===
- April 2: 46th Academy Awards: Frank Film by Frank Mouris wins the Academy Award for Best Animated Short.
- April 9: The Peanuts holiday television special It's the Easter Beagle, Charlie Brown premieres on CBS.

=== May ===
- May 9–24: 1974 Cannes Film Festival:
  - Peter Foldes' Hunger wins the Special Jury Prize.
  - The Nine Lives of Fritz the Cat, a sequel to Ralph Bakshi's Fritz the Cat, becomes the first animated film to be entered at the Cannes Film Festival, but wins no awards. The film is later officially released on 26 June, but flops. Only later will it gain a cult following.

=== June ===
- June 15: Cesare Perfetto's Around the World with Peynet's Lovers is first released.

=== July ===
- July 8: Charles Swenson's X-rated animated film Down and Dirty Duck premieres, featuring the voices of rock singers Mark Volman and Howard Kaylan (aka Flo & Eddie). The film was refused to be advertised for its excessive sexual content, LGBT stereotypes, and pornographic imagery.

=== September ===
- September 7: The first episode of Hong Kong Phooey, produced by Hanna-Barbera, is broadcast.
- September 26: The film Dunderklumpen! is first released.

=== October ===
- October 6: The first episode of Space Battleship Yamato is broadcast.
- October 16: The first episode of Chapi Chapo is broadcast.
- October 21: The first episode of Roobarb is broadcast.

=== November ===
- November 1: Karel Zeman's Adventures of Sinbad the Sailor premieres.

=== Specific date unknown ===
- Mad Magazine makes a television special, directed by Chris Ishii, where several of their comics series appear in animated form. The special never airs, due to television regulations. Edgy programs were banned by the restrictions of the television code at the time.

== Films released ==
- January 15 - The Gentlemen of Titipu (Australia)
- March 6 - Cyrano (United States)
- March 16 - Yaemon, the Locomotive (Japan)
- March 29 - Robinson Crusoe (Italy and Romania)
- May 15 - The Magical Mystery Trip Through Little Red's Head (United States)
- June 15 - Around the World with Peynet's Lovers (Italy and France)
- June 26 - The Nine Lives of Fritz the Cat (United States)
- July 8 - Down and Dirty Duck (United States)
- July 10 - Oliver Twist (United States)
- July 20 - Jack and the Beanstalk (Japan)
- July 25 - Mazinger Z vs. The Great General of Darkness (Japan)
- August 15 - The Three Musketeers (United Kingdom and Italy)
- September 26 - Dunderklumpen! (Sweden)
- October 9 - Prince Piwi (Denmark)
- November 1 - Adventures of Sinbad the Sailor (Czechoslovakia)
- December 10 - The Year Without a Santa Claus (United States and Japan)

== Television series ==
- January 6 - Heidi, Girl of the Alps debuts on Fuji TV
- January 31 - Vicky the Viking debuts on ORF, ZDF, and Fuji Television
- February 12 - Bagpuss debuts on BBC2.
- April 1:
  - Chargeman Ken! debuts on TBS.
  - Hoshi no Ko Poron debuts on Hokkaido Cultural Broadcasting.
  - Jûdô Sanka debuts in syndication.
  - Majokko Megu-chan debuts on NET (now TV Asahi).
- April 2 - Dame Oyaji debuts on Tokyo Channel 12.
- April 4:
  - Getter Robo debuts on Fuji TV.
  - Konchû Monogatari Shin Minashigo Hutch debuts on NET (now TV Asahi).
- April 5:
  - Gan to Gon debuts on SBS.
  - Hoshi no Ko Chobin debuts on TBS.
- September 7:
  - Devlin, Hong Kong Phooey, The New Adventures of Gilligan, and These Are the Days debut on ABC.
  - Partridge Family 2200 A.D., U.S. of Archie, and Valley of the Dinosaurs debut on CBS.
  - Wheelie and the Chopper Bunch debuts on NBC.
- September 8 - Great Mazinger debuts on Fuji TV.
- October 4:
  - Hariken Polymar debuts on NET (now TV Asahi).
  - Jim Botan debuts in syndication.
- October 5 - Hajime Ningen Gyatôruzu debuts on Asahi Hôsô.
- October 6:
  - Space Battleship Yamato debuts on NNN/NNS (YTV).
  - Tentô Mushi No Uta debuts on Fuji TV.
- October 13 - Barbapapa debuts in syndication.
- October 16 - Chapi Chapo debuts on R(T)F Television.
- October 21 - Roobarb debuts on BBC1.
- Specific date unknown - Mio Mao debuts on Programma Nazionale and Channel 5.

== Births ==
=== January ===
- January 1: Chris Butler, English animator, storyboard artist (Mr. Bean: The Animated Series), writer, and director (Laika).
- January 10: Jemaine Clement, New Zealand actor, comedian, musician and filmmaker (voice of Tamatoa in the Moana franchise, Nigel in Rio and Rio 2, Alien in The Drinky Crow Show, Erebos, Alistair, Sir Ian, Man in Line, Caller and Judge Bluetail in TripTank, Jerry the Minion in Despicable Me, Aquaman in DC League of Super-Pets, Dr. Zone and Orton Mahlson in Milo Murphy's Law, Sauron in The Lego Batman Movie, Simon Sex in Big Mouth and Human Resources, This Guy in Tig n' Seek, Ethan in The Simpsons episode "Elementary School Musical", Professor Koontz in the Napoleon Dynamite episode "Scantronica Love", Babel and Tenebres in the Out There episode "Enter Destiny", Fart in the Rick and Morty episode "Mortynight Run", Ziggy in the Regular Show episode "California King", Magunga in the American Dad! episode "Bazooka Steve", the Narrator in the Robot Chicken episode "Freshly Baked: The Robot Chicken Santa Claus Pot Cookie Freakout Special: Special Edition", Courtney in the We Bare Bears episode "Rescue Ranger", Kerry Moonbeam in the Steven Universe Future episode "Mr. Universe").
- January 14: Kevin Durand, Canadian actor (voice of CIA Guy, Skylark Bouncer and Henchman in American Dad!, King Zarkon and Commander Mar in Voltron: Legendary Defender, Anssi, Chauffeur, Manager, Ballcap and Payload Operator in Pantheon, Francois Crossiant in the Glenn Martin, DDS episode "Date with Destiny", Jean Lebeau, Caretaker and Real Estate Agent in the Scooby-Doo and Guess Who? episode "The Last Inmate!", additional voices in the Family Guy episode "Thanksgiving").
- January 18: Maulik Pancholy, American actor and author (voice of Tenzin, Construction Wallah and Kazi in The Wild Thornberrys, Baljeet Tjinder in Phineas and Ferb, Sanjay Patel in Sanjay and Craig, Neil in Milo Murphy's Law, Ranjeet in Mira, Royal Detective, Kamil Sattar in The Replacements episode "Snide and Prejudice", Jasper in the Mickey Mouse Mixed-Up Adventures episode "Here, Kitty, Kitty, Kitty!", additional voices in Q-Force).
- January 20: Ron Brewer, American animator (Computer Warriors), storyboard artist (Klasky Csupo, Family Guy, Nickelodeon Animation Studio, Warner Bros. Animation, American Dad!, The Replacements, Brickleberry, The Great North, Central Park), art director (¡Mucha Lucha!) and director (Attack of the Killer Tomatoes, Wallykazam!).
- January 21: Maxwell Atoms, American animator (The Twisted Tales of Felix the Cat), screenwriter, actor, storyboard artist (Cow and Chicken, I Am Weasel, Poochini, Chowder, Teen Titans Go!), director (Happy Halloween, Scooby-Doo!, Scooby-Doo! The Sword and the Scoob) and producer (Fish Hooks, Bunnicula, creator of The Grim Adventures of Billy & Mandy and Evil Con Carne).
- January 24:
  - Ed Helms, American actor, comedian, singer, writer and producer (voice of Captain Underpants/Mr. Krupp in Captain Underpants: The First Epic Movie, the Once-ler in The Lorax, Kyle Carson in BoJack Horseman, Spleen in Mune: Guardian of the Moon, Graham in Ron's Gone Wrong, Hobo Louie in Everyone's Hero, Al Gore in the Family Guy episode "Fox-y Lady", Mr. Buckley in the American Dad! episode "Stanny Slickers II: The Legend of Ollie's Gold", the King of Atlantis in the Ugly Americans episode "Mark Loves Dick").
  - Erik Wiese, American animator (Boo Boo Runs Wild, A Day in the Life of Ranger Smith), character designer (Jumanji), storyboard artist (Nickelodeon Animation Studio, Samurai Jack, Kick Buttowski: Suburban Daredevil, Sony Pictures Animation, Alpha and Omega: Journey to Bear Kingdom, Peanuts specials), writer (Samurai Jack, SpongeBob SquarePants, Zip Zip), director (Sammy, Dawn of the Croods) and producer (Dawn of the Croods, co-creator of The Mighty B!).
- January 28: Ty Olsson, Canadian actor (voice of Ord in Dragon Tales, Kyle Kelley in Being Ian, Hunk in Voltron Force, Killer Shrike in Iron Man: Armored Adventures, Troll in Packages from Planet X).
- January 29: Kōji Wada, Japanese singer (performed several themes in the Digimon franchise), (d. 2016).
- January 30:
  - Olivia Colman, English actress (voice of Terkel's mother in Terkel in Trouble, Homily in the UK dub of Arrietty, Marion in Thomas & Friends, Mum in We're Going on a Bear Hunt, Strawberry in Watership Down, PAL in The Mitchells vs. the Machines, Donka Pudowski in Ron's Gone Wrong, Mama Bear in Puss in Boots: The Last Wish, Lily in The Simpsons episode "The 7 Beer Itch").
  - Christian Bale, English actor (voice of Thomas in Pocahontas, Howl Pendragon in Howl's Moving Castle).

=== February ===
- February 1: Takashi Onozuka, Japanese voice actor (voice of Paz in Ghost in the Shell, Bosaburo Taira in Rosario + Vampire, dub voice of Dick Grayson in Teen Titans, Teen Titans Go!, The Batman, and Young Justice).
- February 5: Ciro Nieli, American animator, storyboard artist (Family Guy, ¡Mucha Lucha!, Batman: The Brave and the Bold), director (Teen Titans, Transformers: Animated, The Avengers: Earth's Mightiest Heroes) and producer (Teenage Mutant Ninja Turtles, creator of Super Robot Monkey Team Hyperforce Go!).
- February 8: Seth Green, American actor, producer, writer and director (voice of Chris Griffin in Family Guy, Sherman in The Comic Strip, Nelson Nash and Dempsey in Batman Beyond, Todo 360 and Ion Papanoida in Star Wars: The Clone Wars, Lt. Gibbs in Titan Maximum, Monty Monogram in Phineas and Ferb, Rick Jones/A-Bomb in Hulk and the Agents of S.M.A.S.H., Howard the Duck in the Marvel Cinematic Universe, Ultimate Spider-Man, and Guardians of the Galaxy, Blinkerquartz in Crossing Swords, Ahkemnrah in the Dan Vs. episode "The Mummy", Wizard in the Batman: The Animated Series episode "I Am the Knight", Loathsome Leonard in the Rise of the Teenage Mutant Ninja Turtles episode "Raph's Ride-Along", Lance Hale in The Venture Bros. episode "Self-Medication", himself in the Aqua Teen Hunger Force episode "The Dressing" and the Johnny Bravo episode "Back on Shaq", continued voice of Leonardo in Teenage Mutant Ninja Turtles, co-creator of and voice of the title character in Robot Chicken).
- February 10: Elizabeth Banks, American actress and producer (voice of Becky Arangino and Lisa Silver in American Dad!, Mrs. Claus and Shana 'Scarlett' O'Hara in Robot Chicken, Lucy/Wyldstyle in The Lego Movie and The Lego Movie 2: The Second Part, Pizzaz Miller in Moonbeam City, Grulinda in the Phineas and Ferb episode "Imperfect Storm", Pam Fishman in the Family Guy episode "Into Fat Air").
- February 12: Chris Butler, English animator, writer and director (Laika).
- February 16: Mahershala Ali, American actor (voice of Titan in Invincible, Prowler in Spider-Man: Into the Spider-Verse).
- February 17: Jerry O'Connell, American actor (voice of Superman in the DC Animated Movie Universe, Captain Marvel in Superman/Shazam!: The Return of Black Adam and the Justice League Unlimited episode "Clash", Commander Ransom in Star Trek: Lower Decks, Atom in Justice League Action, Nightwing in The Batman, Arizona Jones in Fresh Beat Band of Spies, Pip in Jake and the Never Land Pirates, Barbeque in G.I. Joe: Renegades).
- February 18: Nicole St. John, American voice actress and talent agent (voice of Sally, Comrade Greeting Card and Electronic Orphanarium Welcome Card in Futurama).

=== March ===
- March 3: David Faustino, American actor (voice of Dagur in Dragons: Riders of Berk, Mako in The Legend of Korra, Fox in The Batman, Cavin in season 2 of Adventures of the Gummi Bears, Helia in Winx Club, Scruffy in The Zeta Project episode "His Maker's Name", Starburst in the Static Shock episode "Showtime", Sean Miller in the Batman Beyond episode "The Last Resort").
- March 5: Matt Lucas, English actor and comedian (voice of Benny in Gnomeo & Juliet and Sherlock Gnomes, Charlie in The Queen's Corgi, Mr. Collick in Missing Link).
- March 8: Brandon Vietti, American animator, director and producer (Adelaide Productions, Warner Bros. Animation).
- March 9: Noriaki Sugiyama, Japanese voice actor and narrator (voice of Sasuke Uchiha in Naruto, Uryū Ishida in Bleach, Shirō Emiya in Fate/stay night).
- March 12: Kathleen Fleming, American producer (The Lego Group), (d. 2013).
- March 18: Cosmo Segurson, American animator, storyboard artist (Camp Lazlo, Chowder, Dan Vs.), background artist (Adelaide Productions), animatic editor (The Avengers: Earth's Mightiest Heroes), writer (Camp Lazlo, Chowder, Rocko's Modern Life: Static Cling, The Cuphead Show!), director (Pig Goat Banana Cricket, Rocko's Modern Life: Static Cling) and producer (The Cuphead Show!).
- March 21: Rhys Darby, New Zealand actor and comedian (voice of the Master of Games in Teen Titans Go! vs. Teen Titans, Randall in Infinity Train, Neal in Carmen Sandiego, Hypno-potamus in Rise of the Teenage Mutant Ninja Turtles, Coran in Voltron: Legendary Defender, Bibbly in Trolls, Crash Bandicoot in Skylanders Academy, Mwenzi in The Lion Guard, Langstrom Fischler in Thunderbirds Are Go, Percy in Jake and the Never Land Pirates).
- March 23: Randall Park, American actor and filmmaker (voice of Jimmy Woo in Marvel Zombies, Mr. Sarner in the Solar Opposites episode "The Ping Pong Table", Chen the Cheerleader in The Lego Ninjago Movie, Butch in Paw Patrol: The Movie, Donovan Kim in the Hot Streets episode "Got a Minute for Love?", Eugene in the Mao Mao: Heroes of Pure Heart episode "Adoradad", Hugo in the Adventure Time: Distant Lands episode "BMO", Wizard Shadowbeard in the Where's Waldo? "Shadow of Ball", Bertie's Father in Tuca & Bertie, Apergosian High Leader in the Star Trek: Lower Decks episode "Strange Energies", Yao/Odd-Odd in the Gremlins: Secrets of the Mogwai episode "Always Buy a Ticket").
- March 24: Alyson Hannigan, American actress (voice of Claire Clancy in Fancy Nancy, Gerda in The Wild Thornberrys episode "Every Little Bit Alps", Stacey Gibson in the King of the Hill episode "Talking Shop", Melody in The Simpsons episode "Flaming Moe", Winter in the Sofia the First episode "Winter's Gift").
- March 26: Natasha Leggero, American actress and comedian (voice of Jin Jing in Duck Duck Goose, Poison Ivy in Justice League Action, Ethel Anderson in season 2 of Brickleberry).

=== April ===
- April 1: Andrey Sokolov, Russian animator (Mr. Bean: The Animated Series, What a Cartoon!) and storyboard artist (Mike, Lu & Og), (d. 2025).
- April 11: Tricia Helfer, Canadian actress (voice of the Grid in Tron: Uprising, Black Cat in The Spectacular Spider-Man, Boodikka in Green Lantern: First Flight, Donna Gueterman in the Rick and Morty episode "The Wedding Squanchers", Sif in The Super Hero Squad Show episode "O, Brother!").
- April 18: Edgar Wright, English filmmaker (voice of Goat in Sing, Dog Cop and Pig Chauffeur in Sing 2, Alistair Boorswan in the DuckTales episode "The Duck Knight Returns!").
- April 21:
  - John Hasler, English actor (voice of the title character in Thomas & Friends).
  - Kevin Hageman, American screenwriter and producer (Ninjago, Hotel Transylvania, The Lego Movie, Trollhunters: Tales of Arcadia, The Lego Ninjago Movie, The Croods: A New Age, Trollhunters: Rise of the Titans, Star Trek: Prodigy).
- April 24: Jennifer Paz, Filipino-American actress (voice of Lapis Lazuli in the Steven Universe franchise, Tracy in As Told by Ginger).
- April 28:
  - Penélope Cruz, Spanish actress (voice of Juarez in G-Force).
  - Eric Vale, American voice actor (voice of Trunks in Dragon Ball, Vinsmoke Sanji in One Piece, America and Canada in Hetalia: Axis Powers, Koichiro Iketani in Initial D).

=== May ===
- May 2: Matt Berry, British actor (voice of Prince Merkimer in Disenchantment, Butt Witch in Twelve Forever, Poseidon in The SpongeBob Movie: Sponge on the Run, Bubbles in The SpongeBob Movie: Sponge Out of Water).
- May 6: Matthew Yang King, American actor (voice of Stephen Shin in Justice League: Throne of Atlantis, Persuader in Justice League vs. the Fatal Five, Alan Ripple in Elemental, Tunnel Rat in G.I. Joe: Renegades).
- May 7: Breckin Meyer, American actor, writer, and producer (voice of Joseph Gribble in King of the Hill, Spud in Potato Head Kids, Glenn in Crossing Swords, Josh Mankey in the Kim Possible episode "Crush").
- May 17: Sendhil Ramamurthy, American actor (voice of Khensu in Cleopatra in Space, Deepak in Mira, Royal Detective, Ra's al Ghul in the DC Super Hero Girls episode "#LeagueOfShadows", Saundor in The Legend of Vox Machina episode "The Echo Tree").
- May 21: Fairuza Balk, American actress (voice of Connie D'Amico and Coco in Family Guy, Penny Dee in the Justice League episode "Only a Dream", Roxy in the Close Enough episode "Halloween Enough").
- May 22: Sean Gunn, American actor (voice of G.I. Robot and Weasel in Creature Commandos, Kraglin in the What If...? episode "What If... T'Challa Became a Star-Lord?").
- May 23: Ken Jennings, American game show contestant, host and author (voiced himself in The Simpsons episode "The Caper Chase").
- May 29: Aaron McGruder, American writer, cartoonist and producer (creator of The Boondocks).

=== June ===
- June 1: Henry Jackman, English composer (Walt Disney Animation Studios, DreamWorks Animation).
- June 5:
  - Lino DiSalvo, American animator, director, writer, and actor (Walt Disney Animation Studios, Playmobil: The Movie, Prep & Landing).
  - Chad Allen, American psychologist and former actor (voice of Charlie Brown in Happy New Year, Charlie Brown!, Terrian Scientist in Battle for Terra, Hubert Belveshire in the Pound Puppies episode "From Wags to Riches").
  - Allison Keith, American voice actress (voice of Misato Katsuragi in Neon Genesis Evangelion, Melissa Mao in Full Metal Panic!).
- June 7: Dave Filoni, American animator (King of the Hill, The Oblongs), screenwriter, storyboard artist (King of the Hill, Mission Hill, Disney Television Animation), voice actor, producer and director (Avatar: The Last Airbender, Lucasfilm Animation).
- June 12:
  - Jared Bush, American screenwriter, producer, and director (Walt Disney Animation Studios, creator of Penn Zero: Part-Time Hero).
  - Jason Mewes, American actor, comedian, producer, and podcaster (voice of Jay in Clerks: The Animated Series and Jay & Silent Bob's Super Groovy Cartoon Movie!, Worker #1 in Scooby-Doo! and Kiss: Rock and Roll Mystery, Jimmy, Caller and Michael in Triptank, Kit in Bling, Stinkor and Baddrah in Masters of the Universe: Revelation).
- June 16: Joseph May, English actor (second voice of Thomas in Thomas & Friends).
- June 17: Matthew Senreich, American television writer, producer, director and voice actor (co-creator and voice of various characters in Robot Chicken, Curious Paparazzo, DJ and Cadet #5 in Titan Maximum, Lumberjack in SuperMansion, co-founder of Stoopid Buddy Stoodios).
- June 19: Bumper Robinson, American actor (voice of Rook Blonko in Ben 10: Omniverse, Falcon in Ultimate Spider-Man and Avengers Assemble, Principal Bump in The Owl House, Jamal Williams in Scooby-Doo and the Ghoul School, Carter in Teenage Mutant Ninja Turtles, Danny Pickett in What's with Andy?, Bumblebee and Blitzwing in Transformers: Animated, Black Lightning in Batman: The Brave and the Bold, War Machine in The Avengers: Earth's Mightiest Heroes, Dwight Conrad in Futurama).
- June 22: Donald Faison, American actor and comedian (voice of Toots and Wally in Clone High, Firefighter Hero in Higglytown Heroes, Tobias, Catcher Freeman and Wedgie Rudlin in The Boondocks, Bartik in Tron: Uprising, Quiplash in SuperMansion, Dragos in Vampirina, Hype Faizon in Star Wars Resistance, March Hare in Alice's Wonderland Bakery, Ricky Rotiffle in the Kim Possible episode "Homecoming Upset", Warship Commander, Cadet #3 and Idiotic Club Moron in the Titan Maximum episode "Pilot", Christopher Turk in the American Dad! episode "G-String Circus", the title character in the Adventure Time episode "Princess Cookie", Tactical Droid in the Star Wars: The Clone Wars episode "Old Friends Not Forgotten", Beehive in the Infinity Train episode "The Party Car").
- June 25: Brian J. Kaufman, American production supervisor and television producer (The Simpsons).

=== July ===
- July 3: Clayton Morrow, American animator (The Powerpuff Girls), character designer (Cartoon Network Studios), storyboard artist (Cartoon Network Studios, The Haunted World of El Superbeasto, Disney Television Animation, Puss in Boots), writer, producer (Billy Dilley's Super-Duper Subterranean Summer) and director (Kick Buttowski: Suburban Daredevil, Mickey Mouse, The Cuphead Show!).
- July 4: Mick Wingert, American voice actor (voice of Iron Man in Avengers Assemble, What If...?, Spider-Man, Guardians of the Galaxy and Marvel Future Avengers, Po in Kung Fu Panda: Legends of Awesomeness and Kung Fu Panda: The Paws of Destiny, Star-Lord in Marvel Disk Wars: The Avengers, Sir Dax, Freedo, Nitelite and other various characters in Sofia the First, Clark Carmichael in The Fairly OddParents, Martín, Lomo, and Bruce Butterfrog in Elena of Avalor, Heimerdinger in Arcane, Joker in Batwheels).
- July 7: Xandy Sussan, American television writer (Firehouse Tales, Pet Alien, Warner Bros. Animation).
- July 12: Rodney Clouden, American animator, character designer (Duckman, Stressed Eric, The Wild Thornberrys, Dilbert), storyboard artist (The Wild Thornberrys, Baby Blues, Futurama, Drawn Together), director (American Dad!) and producer (Moon Girl and Devil Dinosaur).
- July 18: Michael Dante DiMartino, American animator (King of the Hill, The Simpsons), producer, writer and director (Mission Hill, Family Guy, King of the Hill, co-creator of Avatar: The Last Airbender and The Legend of Korra).
- July 25: Lauren Faust, American animator (The Maxx, The Pebble and the Penguin, Cats Don't Dance, Quest for Camelot, The Iron Giant), storyboard artist, writer, director and producer (The Powerpuff Girls, Foster's Home for Imaginary Friends, Wander Over Yonder, DC Super Hero Girls, Kid Cosmic, creator of My Little Pony: Friendship is Magic).
- July 28: Banksy, English street artist, political activist and film director (animated the couch gag for The Simpsons episode "MoneyBart").
- July 29:
  - Gail Simone, American writer (Justice League Unlimited, Revisioned: Tomb Raider, Batman: The Brave and the Bold, My Little Pony: Friendship is Magic, Strawberry Shortcake: Berry in the Big City, Wonder Woman, Red Sonja: Queen of Plagues).
  - Josh Radnor, American actor (voice of Durpleton in Centaurworld).

=== August ===
- August 2: Angie Cepeda, Colombian actress (voice of Julieta Madrigal in Encanto).
- August 14: Christopher Gorham, American actor (voice of Flash in the DC Animated Movie Universe, Oliver Queen in Batman: The Doom That Came to Gotham, Wrath in The Batman episode "The End of the Batman").
- August 16: Edwin E. Aguilar, Salvadoran-American animator (The Simpsons, The Oblongs) and storyboard artist (The Simpsons, Brickleberry), (d. 2021).
- August 20: Amy Adams, American actress (portrayed and voiced Giselle in Enchanted, voice of Misty, Merilynn, Sunshine and Dawn's Little Musician in King of the Hill).
- August 24: Jennifer Lien, American actress (voice of Agent L in Men in Black: The Series, Valerie Fox in The Critic episode "Pilot", Movie Actress in the Duckman episode "Apocalypse Not", Elise in The Real Adventures of Jonny Quest episode "Eclipse", Inza Nelson in the Superman: The Animated Series episode "The Hand of Fate").
- August 28: Kristin Booth, Canadian actress (voice of Parker Kovak in Producing Parker, Evie in Braceface, Horse Tessa in The Boys)

=== September ===
- September 1: Jhonen Vasquez, American animator, cartoonist, character designer (Randy Cunningham: 9th Grade Ninja), writer (Bravest Warriors) and producer (creator and voice of Zim's Computer, Nick, Minimoose, and various other characters in Invader Zim).
- September 4:
  - James Monroe Iglehart, American actor and singer (voice of Lance Strongbow in Rapunzel's Tangled Adventure, Bronzino in Elena of Avalor, Vortex and Asmodeus in Helluva Boss, Calvin Carney and Jitterbug in Tom and Jerry: Back to Oz, Taurus Bulba in the DuckTales episode "Let's Get Dangerous!", Oscar in the Vampirina episode "Bust Friends", Oliver the Onion in the Alice's Wonderland Bakery episode "A Special Blend", Martin Chatterley in Kiff).
  - Nona Gaye, American actress and singer (voice of Hero Girl in The Polar Express).
- September 18: Shadi Petosky, American animator (Yo Gabba Gabba!, The Aquabats! Super Show!, Mad), writer and producer (Twelve Forever, co-creator of Danger & Eggs).
- September 19:
  - Edi Patterson, American actress and writer (voice of Pirotesse and Sheru in Legend of Crystania, Yuka Takeuchi in Variable Geo, Jun Kazama in Tekken: The Motion Picture, Nina Shutenberg in City Hunter: Death of the Vicious Criminal Ryo Saeba, Courtney Baynes and Mary Lynne MacGovern in Mike Tyson Mysteries, Mertha and Anna Nanna in The Fungies!, Tom's Mom, Strung Out Woman, Linda and Red Sox Fan #2 in Ten Year Old Tom, Sophie in Teenage Euthanasia, Scout Pinecone Leader and Rock #1 in the Infinity Train episode "The Campfire Car", Momdebra and Cat Student in the Adventure Time: Distant Lands episode "Wizard City", Jessica in The Simpsons episode "Meat Is Murder", Jangel and Angelions in the Battle Kitty episode "Acidic Dunes", additional voices in Mars Needs Moms and We Bare Bears).
  - Jimmy Fallon, American stand-up comedian, television host, actor, writer, producer, singer, and musician (voice of Dylan in The Magic Roundabout, Prince Betameche in the Arthur and the Invisibles franchise, himself in the Family Guy episode "We Love You Conrad").

=== October ===
- October 6:
  - Jeremy Sisto, American actor, producer, and writer (voice of Batman in Justice League: The New Frontier, Talon in Batman vs. Robin, Ferdinand's Father in Ferdinand, King Runeard in Frozen II).
  - Shannon O'Connor, American animator (Warner Bros. Feature Animation, What a Cartoon!), storyboard artist (Extinct, Peanuts specials) and character designer (Futurama, The Simpsons, Sit Down, Shut Up, The Cleveland Show, Good Vibes, Napoleon Dynamite, Brickleberry, Animals, Disenchantment).
- October 7: Alexander Polinsky, American actor (voice of Control Freak in Teen Titans and Teen Titans Go!, Argit and Jarett in the Ben 10 franchise, Chameleon Boy and Matter-Eater Lad in Legion of Super Heroes, Jimmy Olsen in Batman: The Brave and the Bold).
- October 10: Dale Earnhardt Jr., American semi-retired professional stock car racing driver, team owner, author and analyst (voice of Junior in Cars, Chip Racerson Jr. in the Teen Titans Go! episode "Teen Titans Vroom", himself in The Cleveland Show episode "The Hangover: Part Tubbs").
- October 21: Justin Brinsfield, American production assistant (The Angry Beavers) and recording engineer (Nickelodeon Animation Studio, Gary the Rat, Stripperella).
- October 23: Andy Suriano, American character designer (Nickelodeon Animation Studio, Cartoon Network Studios, Warner Bros. Animation, Electric City, Mickey Mouse, DuckTales), storyboard artist (Warner Bros. Animation, Shorty McShorts' Shorts, The Mighty B!, Sym-Bionic Titan, G.I. Joe: Renegades, Electric City, Disney Television Animation, Ben 10: Omniverse, Hulk and the Agents of S.M.A.S.H.), prop designer (Duck Dodgers, Mickey Mouse), art director (Rise of the Teenage Mutant Ninja Turtles), writer (Mickey Mouse), director and producer (Shorty McShorts' Shorts, Rise of the Teenage Mutant Ninja Turtles).
- October 24: John Burgmeier, American voice actor (voice of Kurama in Yu Yu Hakusho, Tien in the Dragon Ball franchise, Shigure Sohma in Fruits Basket, Eyes Rutherford in Spiral, Switzerland in Hetalia: Axis Powers, Donavan Desmond in Spy × Family).
- October 27: Amber Tornquist Hollinger, American animator (The Critic, Timon & Pumbaa), storyboard artist (Disney Television Animation, Hey Arnold!, Duckman, Harold and the Purple Crayon, Disneytoon Studios, Strawberry Shortcake's Berry Bitty Adventures, Hoops & Yoyo Ruin Christmas, Warner Bros. Animation, Postman Pat: The Movie, The Adventures of Puss in Boots, Onyx Equinox, HouseBroken, High Guardian Spice, Stillwater) and director (HouseBroken, High Guardian Spice, Stillwater, Hamster & Gretel).
- October 28: Joaquin Phoenix, American actor (voice of Kenai in Brother Bear).

=== November ===
- November 7: Carl Steven, American former child actor (voice of Pigpen and Franklin in Snoopy's Getting Married, Charlie Brown, Woody in Happily Ever After, Jamie Bingham in Fluppy Dogs, Fred Jones in A Pup Named Scooby-Doo), (d. 2011).
- November 8: Matthew Rhys, Welsh actor (voice of Emperor Belos in The Owl House, Alrick and Aloysius in Infinity Train, Riley Greene in Gremlins: Secrets of the Mogwai).
- November 9: Joe C., American rapper and musician (voice of Kidney Rock in Osmosis Jones, voiced himself in The Simpsons episode "Kill the Alligator and Run"), (d. 2000).
- November 15: James Wootton, Canadian animator (Ed, Edd n Eddy, WildBrain Studios), storyboard artist (Ed, Edd n Eddy, Packages from Planet X, Sausage Party, All Hail King Julien, The Willoughbys, Trollhunters: Rise of the Titans, He-Man and the Masters of the Universe, Hotel Transylvania: Transformania, Paws of Fury: The Legend of Hank) and director (WildBrain Studios, DreamWorks Animation Television).
- November 16: Kelsey Mann, American animator, cartoonist, storyboard artist (Duck Dodgers, Megas XLR, My Gym Partner's a Monkey, Foster's Home For Imaginary Friends), writer, director and producer (Monsters University, Party Central, The Good Dinosaur, Inside Out 2, Pixar Animation Studios)
- November 24: Stephen Merchant, English actor, comedian, director, presenter and writer (voice of Mr. Phillips in Bromwell High, Paris in Gnomeo & Juliet and Sherlock Gnomes, Alfred Pennyworth in the Robot Chicken episode "Stone Cold Steve Cold Stone", Conrad in The Simpsons episode "The Girl Code", Scientist in the American Dad! episode "The Two Hundred", co-creator and co-host of The Ricky Gervais Show).
- November 25: Kenneth Mitchell, Canadian actor (voice of Seartave in Star Trek: Lower Decks), (d. 2024).
- November 28: James C. Mathis III, American actor (voice of Black Panther in The Avengers: Earth's Mightiest Heroes and Avengers Assemble, Terrax in Ultimate Spider-Man and Hulk and the Agents of S.M.A.S.H., Captain Typho in Star Wars: The Clone Wars).

=== December ===
- December 15: P. J. Byrne, American actor (voice of Bolin in The Legend of Korra, Firestorm in Justice League Action, Maxwell Lord in the DC Super Hero Girls episode "#WorldsFinest", Flash in the Teen Titans Go! episode "Teen Titans Action").
- December 17:
  - Paul Briggs, American animator, storyboard artist and actor (Walt Disney Animation Studios).
  - Sarah Paulson, American actress (voice of Dr. Zara in Abominable, Sarah Paulson, Marcia Clark and Costumed Woman in the Family Guy episode "You Can't Handle the Booth").
  - Giovanni Ribisi, American actor (voice of Cebolo in Spirit of the Forest, Joker and Two-Face in Robot Chicken).
- December 20: Rachel Ramras, American actress (voice of various characters in Mad and The Looney Tunes Show, Lola Bunny in Looney Tunes: Rabbits Run, Shandi Strutter in Scooby-Doo! and Kiss: Rock and Roll Mystery, Yung Hee Tyson in Mike Tyson Mysteries, Dolly Parton in the Code Monkeys episode "Dave Gets Boobs", Woman #1 in the Robot Chicken episode "May Cause Indecision... Or Not"), comedian, television producer and writer (The Buzz on Maggie, The Looney Tunes Show, Mike Tyson Mysteries).
- December 21: Scott D. Greenberg, American television producer (Film Roman, Bento Box Entertainment).
- December 29: Asheru, American hip hop artist, educator and youth activist (performed the theme song of The Boondocks).
- December 30: Fred Gonzales, American animator and storyboard artist (Disney Television Animation, Nickelodeon Animation Studio, Clerks: The Animated Series, The Mummy, Loonatics Unleashed, The Land Before Time XIV: Journey of the Brave, Dawn of the Croods, Scooby-Doo and Guess Who?, The Boss Baby: Back in Business).

=== Specific date unknown ===
- Derek Kirk Kim, Korean-American animator (Animation Domination High-Def, Adventure Time, Green Eggs and Ham), artist, writer (Adventure Time) and director (Amphibia).
- Henry Jackman, English composer (DreamWorks Animation, Walt Disney Animation Studios, Pixels, Detective Pikachu, Ron's Gone Wrong).
- Yacine Elghorri, French comic book artist, illustrator, animator (Animated Stories from the New Testament, The Swan Princess: The Mystery of the Enchanted Treasure, Titan A.E.), storyboard artist (Fantastic Four: World's Greatest Heroes), character designer (Flash Gordon, The Why Why Family, Futurama, Xyber 9: New Dawn, The New Adventures of Lucky Luke, W.I.T.C.H.) and prop designer (The Why Why Family).
- Laurie Israel, American television writer (A Little Curious, Growing Up Creepie, Handy Manny, The Fairly OddParents, Olivia, Cosmic Quantum Ray, Wow! Wow! Wubbzy!, Angelina Ballerina: The Next Steps, Thomas & Friends, The Adventures of Chuck and Friends, Robot and Monster, Disney Television Animation, WordGirl, Tumble Leaf, If You Give a Mouse a Cookie, Helpsters, Eureka!).
- Doug Sweetland, American animator and filmmaker (Pixar, Storks).
- Lisa Ortiz, American voice actress and voice director (voice of Lina Inverse in the Slayers franchise, Amy Rose in Sonic X, Serenity Wheeler in Yu-Gi-Oh! Duel Monsters, Tony Tony Chopper in the 4Kids dub of One Piece).
- Shadi Petosky, American television producer and writer (Danger & Eggs, Twelve Forever, Yo Gabba Gabba!).

== Deaths ==
=== January ===
- January 14: Paul Whitsun-Jones, Welsh actor (voice of Fezziwig in A Christmas Carol), dies at age 50.
- January 15: Sam Slyfield, American sound engineer (Walt Disney Animation Studios), dies at age 75.
- January 28: Courtland Hector Hoppin, American animator and photographer (La Joie de Vivre), dies at age 67.

=== February ===
- February 4: Stuart Buchanan, American voice actor, casting director, radio and television producer, and educator (voiced the Huntsman in Snow White and the Seven Dwarfs (1937), Goofy in The Mickey Mouse Theater of the Air , and an unnamed flight attendant in Saludos Amigos), dies at age 79.

=== March ===
- March 5: Billy De Wolfe, American actor (voice of Professor Hinkle in Frosty the Snowman), dies at age 67.
- March 8: Martha Wentworth, American actress (voice of Madam Mim, Granny Squirrel and Scullery Maid in The Sword in the Stone, Mama Katzenjammer in The Captain and the Kids, and Nanny, Queenie and Lucy in One Hundred and One Dalmatians), dies at age 84.

=== April ===
- April 14: Sylvia Holland, English concept artist, illustrator and storyboard artist (Walt Disney Animation Studios), dies at age 73.
- April 30: Agnes Moorehead, American actress (voice of the Goose in Charlotte's Web), dies at age 73.

=== June ===
- June 27: Cliff Friend, American songwriter and pianist (co-wrote "The Merry-Go-Round Broke Down" for Looney Tunes), dies at age 80.

=== July ===
- July 19: Joe Flynn, American actor (voice of Mr. Snoops in The Rescuers), dies at age 49.
- July 20: Allen Jenkins, American actor (voice of Officer Dibble in Top Cat), dies at age 74.
- July 22: Alain Saint-Ogan, French comics writer, artist and animator (adapted his comic Prosper L'Ours into a 1934 animated short), dies at age 78.
- July 26: Gene Byrnes, American cartoonist (created the long-running comic strip Reg'lar Fellers, which received the animated adaptations Happy Days by Ub Iwerks and Boy Meets Dog! by Walter Lantz), dies at age 85.

=== August ===
- August 24: Alexander de Seversky, Russian-American aviation pioneer, inventor, and influential advocate of strategic air power (technical consultant and live-action commentator in the animated feature film Victory Through Air Power), dies at age 80.

=== September ===
- September 9: Manuel Urda Marín, Spanish comics artist and animator, dies at age 86.
- September 14: Barbara Jo Allen, American actress (voice of Fauna in Sleeping Beauty, Goliath II's mother in Goliath II, Scullery Maid in The Sword in the Stone), dies at age 68.

=== October ===
- October 7: Vladimir Degtyaryov, Russian film director and animator (Beloved Beauty), dies at age 58.

=== December ===
- December 2: Cal Dalton, American film director and animator (Warner Bros. Cartoons, Walt Disney Company), dies at age 65.
- December 26: Jack Benny, American actor, comedian, vaudevillian, and violinist (portrayed and voiced himself in The Mouse That Jack Built and The Mad, Mad, Mad Comedians), dies at age 80.

== See also ==
- 1974 in anime

== External sources ==
- Watts, Steven. The Magic Kingdom: Walt Disney and the American way of Life. Columbia, Missouri: University of Missouri Press, 2001. ISBN 0-8262-1379-0.
