= List of animated television series of 1974 =

A list of animated television series first aired in 1974.

Animated television series first aired in 1974
| Title | Episodes | Country | Year | Notes | Technique |
|---|---|---|---|---|---|
| Bagpuss | 13 | United Kingdom | 1974 | | Stop-Motion |
| Barbapapa | 100 | France; Japan | 1974 | | Traditional |
| Calimero | 45 | Japan | 1974–75 | | Traditional |
| Chapi Chapo | 60 | France | 1974–75 | | Stop-Motion |
| Chargeman Ken! | 65 | Japan | 1974 | | Anime |
| The Do-It-Yourself Film Animation Show | 5 | United Kingdom | 1974 | | Traditional/Cut-Out/Stop-Motion/Live Action |
| Dame Oyaji | 26 | Japan | 1974 | | Anime |
| Devlin | 16 | United States | 1974 | | Traditional |
| First Human Giatrus | 77 | Japan | 1974–76 | | Anime |
| Gan to Gon | 260 | Japan | 1974–75 | | Anime |
| Getter Robo | 51 | Japan | 1974–75 | | Anime |
| Great Mazinger | 56 | Japan | 1974–75 | | Anime |
| Heidi, Girl of the Alps | 52 | Japan | 1974 | | Anime |
| Hong Kong Phooey | 16 | United States | 1974 | | Traditional |
| Hoshi no Ko Chobin | 26 | Japan | 1974 | | Anime |
| Hoshi no Ko Poron | 260 | Japan | 1974–75 | | Anime |
| Hurricane Polymar | 26 | Japan | 1974–75 | | Anime |
| Jim Botan | 26 | Japan | 1974–75 | | Anime |
| Judo Sanka | 27 | Japan | 1974 | | Anime |
| Majokko Megu-chan | 72 | Japan | 1974–75 | | Anime |
| Miaunel and Bălănel | 60 | Romania | 1974–82 | | Traditional |
| Mio Mao | 78 | Italy | 1974–2007 | | Stop-Motion |
| Mr. Men | 28 | United Kingdom | 1974–78 | | Traditional |
| The New Adventures of Gilligan | 24 | United States | 1974–75 | Spin-off of Gilligan's Island | Traditional |
| New Honeybee Hutch | 26 | Japan | 1974 | | Anime |
| Partridge Family 2200 A.D. | 16 | United States | 1974 | Spin-off of The Partridge Family | Traditional |
| Roobarb | 30 | United Kingdom | 1974 | | Traditional |
| Simon in the Land of Chalk Drawings | 24 | United Kingdom | 1974–76 | | Traditional |
| The Song of Tentomushi | 104 | Japan | 1974–76 | | Anime |
| Space Battleship Yamato | 26 | Japan | 1974–75 | | Anime |
| These Are the Days | 16 | United States | 1974–75 | | Traditional |
| Tonari no Tamageta-kun | 60 | Japan | 1974–75 | | Anime |
| The U.S. of Archie | 16 | United States | 1974 | | Traditional |
| Urikupen Kyūjotai | 156 | Japan | 1974–75 | | Anime |
| Valley of the Dinosaurs | 16 | United States | 1974 | | Traditional |
| Vicky the Viking (1974) | 78 | West Germany; Japan | 1974–76 | | Traditional |
| Wheelie and the Chopper Bunch | 13 | United States | 1974 | | Traditional |

== See also ==
- List of animated feature films of 1974
- List of Japanese animation television series of 1974
