= 1974 in anime =

The events of 1974 in anime.

== Releases ==
English name	Japanese name	Type	Demographic	Regions
The Life of a Poet	詩人の生涯 (Shijin no Shougai)	Movie	Family	Japan
Polon the Star Child	星の子ポロン (Hoshi no Ko Poron)	TV	Children	Japan, Arabia
Heidi, Girl of the Alps	アルプスの少女ハイジ (Arupusu no Shōjo Haiji)	TV	Family, Children	Japan, Spain, Italy, India, Poland, Portugal, Netherlands, Philippines, Arabia, Japan, China (Taiwan), Korea
No Good Dad	ダメおやじ (Dame Oyaji)	TV	Shōnen	Spain, Russia, Japan
Mazinger Z vs. Dr. Hell	マジンガーZ対ドクターヘル (Majingâ Zetto tai Dokutâ Heru)	Movie	Shōnen	Japan
Yaemon, the Locomotive	きかんしゃやえもん D51の大冒険 (Kikansha Yaemon: D-goichi no Daibōken)	Movie	Family, Children	Japan, Arabia, German [named samurai express in german]
Little Meg the Witch Girl	(魔女っ子メグちゃん (Majokko Megu-chan)	TV	Shōjo	Portugal, Poland, Italy, Spain, France, Russia, Japan, Korea
Hymn to Judo	柔道讃歌 (Judo Sanka)	TV	Shōnen	Japan, Spain
Chargeman Ken!	チャージマン研！ (Chājiman Ken!)	TV	Shōnen	Japan
Vicky the Viking	小さなバイキング ビッケ (Chiisana Viking Bikke)	TV	Family, Children	Japan, France, Sweden, Spain, Italy, Portugal, Netherlands, Germany, Poland, Arabia, China (Taiwan), Netherlands, Korea
Getter Robo	ゲッターロボ (Gettā Robo)	TV	Shōnen	Japan, Italy, Philippines
My Neighbor Tamageta	となりのたまげ太くん (Tonari no Tamageta-kun)	TV	Children	Japan
The New Adventures of Hutch the Honeybee	昆虫物語 新みなしごハッチ (Konchū Monogatari: Shin Minashigo Hatchi)	TV	Children	Japan, Italy
Chobin the Star Child	星の子チョビン (Hoshi no Ko Chobin)	TV	Children	Germany, France, Portugal, Italy, Japan
The Beardless Gogejabal	(ひげなしゴゲジャバル) (Higenashi Gogejabaru)	Movie	Children	Japan
Zero Tester	ゼロテスター (Zerotesutā)	TV	Shōnen	Japan, Korea
Jack and the Beanstalk	ジャックと豆の木 (Jakku to Mame no Ki)	Movie	Family, Children	Italy, France, Poland Japan, Spain, Portugal, Germany, Russia, United States
Mazinger Z vs. The Great General of Darkness	マジンガーZ対暗黒大将軍 (Majingâ Zetto tai Ankoku Daishôgun)	Movie	Shōnen	Japan, France, Spain
Getter Robo	ゲッターロボ (Gettā Robo)	Movie	Shōnen	Japan
Great Mazinger	グレートマジンガー (Gurēto Majingā)	TV	Shōnen	Japan, Korea, Spain, Italy
Jungle Tales	ウリクペン救助隊 (Urikupen Kyūjotai)	TV	Children	Portugal, Italy, Germany, Denmark, Sweden, Japan, Canada, United States, Russia
Jim Button	Jim Button (Jim Botan)	TV	Children	Japan, Netherlands, Poland
Hurricane Polymar	破裏拳ポリマー (Hariken Porimā)	TV	Shōnen	Japan, Italy
First Human Giatrus	はじめ人間 ギャートルズ (Hajime Ningen Gyātoruzu)	TV	Shōnen, Children	Japan, Italy
Space Battleship Yamato	宇宙戦艦ヤマト (Uchū Senkan Yamato)	TV	Shōnen	Spain, Portugal, Italy, United States, Japan, France, Arabia, Netherlands, China (Taiwan)
The Song of Tentomushi	てんとう虫の歌 (Tentōmushi no Uta)	TV		Japan, Spain, Italy
Calimero	カリメロ (Karimero)	TV	Children	Japan, French, Spain, Italy, Germany, Arabia, Denmark
Barbapapa	バーバパパ (Barbapapa)	TV	Children	Japan, France, Spain, Italy, Canada
Pop	ポップ (Pop)	Short	Children	Japan

== See also ==
- 1974 in animation
