= List of animated feature films of 1974 =

This is a list of animated feature films first released in 1974.

== List ==
Title	Country	Director	Production company	Animation technique	Format	Notes	Release date	Duration
Adventures of Sinbad the Sailor a. k. a. Sindbad; Pohádky tisíce a jedné noci (Tales of a Thousand and One Nights)	Czechoslovakia	Karel Zeman	Krátký film Praha; Filmové Studio Gottwaldov; Ustredni Pujcovna Filmu	Traditional	Theatrical		November 1, 1974	88 minutes
Around the World with Peynet's Lovers; Il giro del mondo degli innamorati di Peynet (The Turn of the World of the Sweethearts of Peynet)	Italy; France	Cesare Perfetto	Nuovi Orientamenti Cinematografici	Traditional	Theatrical		June 15, 1974	82 minutes
Cyrano	United States	Charles A. Nichols	Hanna-Barbera	Traditional	Television special	Originally aired as the 10th installment of the ABC anthology television series ABC Afterschool Special (1972–1997).	March 6, 1974	60 minutes
Down and Dirty Duck	United States	Charles Swenson	Murakami-Wolf-Swenson	Traditional	Theatrical		July 8, 1974	75 minutes
Dunderklumpen!	Sweden	Per Åhlin	G.K. Film; Europa Film-Stockholm Film	Traditional/Live action	Theatrical; Live-action animated film		September 26, 1974	97 minutes
The Gentlemen of Titipu	Australia	Leif Gram	Air Programs International; Swank Telefilms	Traditional	Television special	Originally aired as the 15th installment of the CBS animated anthology series Famous Classic Tales (1970–1984).	January 15, 1974	47 minutes
Jack and the Beanstalk ジャックと豆の木 (Jakku to Mame no Ki)	Japan	Gisaburō Sugii	Group TAC; Nippon Herald Films	Traditional	Theatrical	The first feature film directed by Gisaburō Sugii and the inaugural production of the anime studio Group TAC.	July 20, 1974	96 minutes
The Magical Mystery Trip Through Little Red's Head	United States	Herbert Klynn	DePatie-Freleng Enterprises	Traditional/Live action	Television special Live-action animated film	Originally aired as the 12th installment of the ABC anthology television series ABC Afterschool Special (1972–1997).	May 15, 1974	60 minutes
Mazinger Z vs. The Great General of Darkness マジンガーＺ対暗黒大将軍 (Majingā Zetto tai Ankoku Daishōgun)	Japan	Tadanao Tsuji	Toei Animation	Traditional	Theatrical		July 25, 1974	43 minutes
The Nine Lives of Fritz the Cat	United States	Robert Taylor	Krantz Films; Cine Camera; American International Pictures	Traditional	Theatrical	Sequel to Fritz the Cat (1972).	June 26, 1974	76 minutes
Oliver Twist	United States	Hal Sutherland	Filmation; Warner Bros. Pictures	Traditional	Theatrical	Second and last film of the aborted Filmation anthology film series Family Classics, which yielded from a distribution deal with Warner Bros. by the animation studio.	July 10, 1974	91 minutes
Prince Piwi; Prins Piwi	Denmark	Flemming Quist Møller	Klynk Film	Traditional/Live action	Theatrical; Live-action animated film		October 9, 1974	90 minutes
Robinson Crusoe; Il racconto della giungla (The Tale of the Jungle)	Italy; Romania	Gibba; Victor Antonescu	Corona Cinematografica; Animafilm Studio; IFE	Traditional	Theatrical	First Romanian animated feature.	March 29, 1974	88 minutes
The Three Musketeers; D'Artagnan l'Intrépide (D'Artagnan the Intrepid)	United Kingdom; Italy	John Halas; Franco Cristofani	Michelangelo Cinematografica; Pendennis Films Ltd. Educational Film Centre; Cristofani Films; Mothership Studios	Traditional	Theatrical		August 15, 1974	68 minutes
Yaemon, the Locomotive きかんしゃやえもん D51の大冒険 (Kikansha Yaemon D51 no Daibōken)	Japan	Takeshi Tamiya	Toei Animation	Traditional	Theatrical		March 16, 1974	62 minutes
The Year Without a Santa Claus	United States; Japan	Jules Bass; Arthur Rankin Jr.	Rankin/Bass; Video Tokyo Production	Stop motion	Television special		December 10, 1974	51 minutes

== See also ==
- List of animated television series of 1974
