= Reg'lar Fellers (film) =

1941 film

- Directed by: Arthur Dreifuss
- Written by: Gene Byrnes (comics); Arthur Hoerl; Arthur Dreifuss; William C. Kent
- Produced by: Arthur Dreifuss; Joe Eudemiller; Ethel Meglin
- Starring: Billy Lee; Carl 'Alfalfa' Switzer; Sarah Padden
- Cinematography: Mack Stengler
- Edited by: Carl Pierson
- Music by: Ross DiMaggio
- Production company: Producers Releasing Corporation
- Distributed by: Producers Releasing Corporation
- Release date: September 5, 1941
- Running time: 60 minutes
- Country: United States
- Language: English

Reg'lar Fellers is a 1941 American comedy film directed by Arthur Dreifuss and starring Billy Lee, Carl "Alfalfa" Switzer and Sarah Padden. It was based on the comic strip of the same name. Former silent film star Marguerite De La Motte appears in a supporting role.

== Cast ==
- Billy Lee as Pinhead Duffy
- Carl 'Alfalfa' Switzer as Bump Hudson
- Buddy Boles as Jimmy Dugan
- Janet Dempsey as Aggie Reilly
- Henry 'Spike' Lee as Skeeter
- Malcolm Hutton as Puddin'Head Duffy
- Sarah Padden as Hetty Carter
- Roscoe Ates as Emory McQuade
- Danna Callahan as Jane Watson
- Diane Ware as Hazel Barry
- Leonard Grassi as Warren Hamilton
- Sharon Lynne as Baby Carter
- Maren Mayo as Caroline Carter
- Netta Packer as Martha
- Jack C. Smith as Officer Flynn
- Marguerite De La Motte as Mrs. Dugan
- Pat O'Malley as Mr. Dugan Sr.
- Anna Ruth Hughes as Molly Dugan
- Dan Stowell as Ferrel
- Lew Laurie as Lubec
- Daisy Ford as Mrs. Duffy
- Herb Vigran as Radio Announcer

== Bibliography ==
- Buck Rainey. Sweethearts of the sage: biographies and filmographies of 258 actresses appearing in western movies. McFarland & Company Incorporated Pub, 1992.
