= Boy Meets Dog! =

1938 film by Walter Lantz

- Title card for Boy Meets Dog
- Directed by: Walter Lantz
- Story by: Victor McLeod
- Based on: Reg'lar Fellers by Gene Byrnes
- Produced by: Walter Lantz
- Starring: Billy Bletcher; Danny Webb; Joe Twerp; The Rhythmettes
- Music by: Frank Churchill; Nathaniel Shilkret
- Animation by: Rudy Zamora; Frank Tipper
- Backgrounds by: Charles Conner; Roy Forkum
- Production company: Walter Lantz Productions
- Distributed by: Universal Pictures; Castle Films
- Release date: March 10, 1938
- Running time: 9 minutes
- Language: English

Boy Meets Dog (1938)

Boy Meets Dog! is an American animated musical commercial short made in 1938 for Ipana Toothpaste. It was produced by Walter Lantz as a Technicolor cartoon for theatrical release by Universal Pictures. However, it did not see theatrical release, but Castle Films purchased it, and released it to the home movie market.

== Plot ==
A boy named Bobby, gets a lesson in school about how to properly massage his gums to take care of his teeth. After class is dismissed, Bobby is offered by one of his friends in to an ice cream shop to have a sundae and go fishing. Bobby turns it down because his extremely strict, cold-hearted, authoritative, gruff, and very mean father (Billy Bletcher) wouldn't let him. On the way home, Bobby finds a beagle and takes him home. They sneak into the house where Bobby cleans him up in order to convince his father to keep him. However, Bobby's father, who wakes up just in time to hear the beagle's barking coming from the upstairs bathroom, angrily scares the beagle away and the beagle hides in the house. He then cruelly and unfairly sends Bobby to his room without supper for disobeying him. Muttering about his son, he steps on a rollerskate and falls down the stairs. He brutally walks back upstairs to Bobby's room to punish him, but Bobby is not there and he begins looking for him. The gnomes and elves on the wallpaper in Bobby's room come alive and knock Bobby's father unconscious and take him into the forest scene in the wallpaper.

He wakes up in a stock before a judge and jury, where he learns that he is charged with being "neurotic and erratic." Joseph the beagle appears in the scene and gives a false testimony that the father "hit him, and then he kicked him." The jury finds that he "has no mentality" because he does not massage his gums, and is "childlike in his dental knowledge" despite the fact that he attended college, and so finds him guilty. The judge then reveals himself to be Bobby, and he sentences his father to the "Youth Machine," The father falls through a trap door in the ground, sliding down a series of curved slides before falling through an open hatch in the Youth Machine which slams shut, leaving him trapped and completely at the mercy of the fantastical contraption.

In the Youth Machine, he is battered by two boxing gloves that disorient and position him in the center of the machine, where a hydraulic press squashes him down to a shorter size. While recovering from being stunned and disoriented from the boxing gloves, and being bamboozled by his shortened height, a large whisk-like device spins and rises up from the floor underneath him, knocking him off his feet. Upon landing, a gloved robotic hand emerges from one of the walls where one boxing glove appeared from, and reaches for his nose, stretching his face and making his nose tiny and button-shaped as it snaps back into place. As he recoils back, a crude barber chair catches him and cuffs his wrists and neck, keeping him secured as an electric hair clipper arm emerges from its backrest to swiftly shave his head completely bald with precision. As the electric hair clipper arm retreats back into the barber chair, he is spooked by the sudden appearance of another gloved robotic hand, which squeezes a tube of hair replacement on his freshly shaved bald scalp, giving it the look of having a singular tuft of hair. Finally, a steam press-like chamber lowers down from above and envelopes him in the barber chair, ejecting his clothing in every direction before lifting and revealing it had successfully regressed the adult into a baby. The newly regressed father cries defiantly as the machine's powdering arm excessively sprinkles baby powder on his behind, before smaller gloved robotic hands scoop him up and reposition him with a cloth diaper, wrapping it over him and securing it with a button via a button press arm that presses into the cloth diaper. Completing his transformation, a nipple of a bottle brushes against his mouth as he continues to fuss and cry defiantly.

Bobby's father wakes up from the beagle licking his face, explaining the sensation of the bottle being rubbed against him. His behavior changes when he sees the Ipana toothpaste sign that concludes that Bobby is smart and begins acting kinder to him. Bobby, his father, and his friends all go out for sundaes and go fishing in the river.

== History ==
The short was originally a commercial for "Ipana Toothpaste", but the scene of the toothpaste ad after Bobby's father wakes up was removed for the Castle Films release. Later prints released by Mizzell Films restored the cut footage, but without its soundtrack, which is now considered lost.

== Cultural impact ==
- The part where the three lawyer gnomes sing about how the father is a "mental giant" would later on be used in (If not inspiring) Tech N9ne's song "He's a mental Giant" in his album All 6's and 7's.
- Also, the part where gnomes sing about how the father is "child like in his dental knowledge" would later on be used in the ending of Carpenter Brut's song "Escape from Midwich Valley" in his album EP I.

== See also ==
- List of films in the public domain in the United States
- Pluto's Judgement Day, a Walt Disney short with a similar trial scene
