= Linda Yamamoto =

Japanese singer and model

- 山本 リンダ
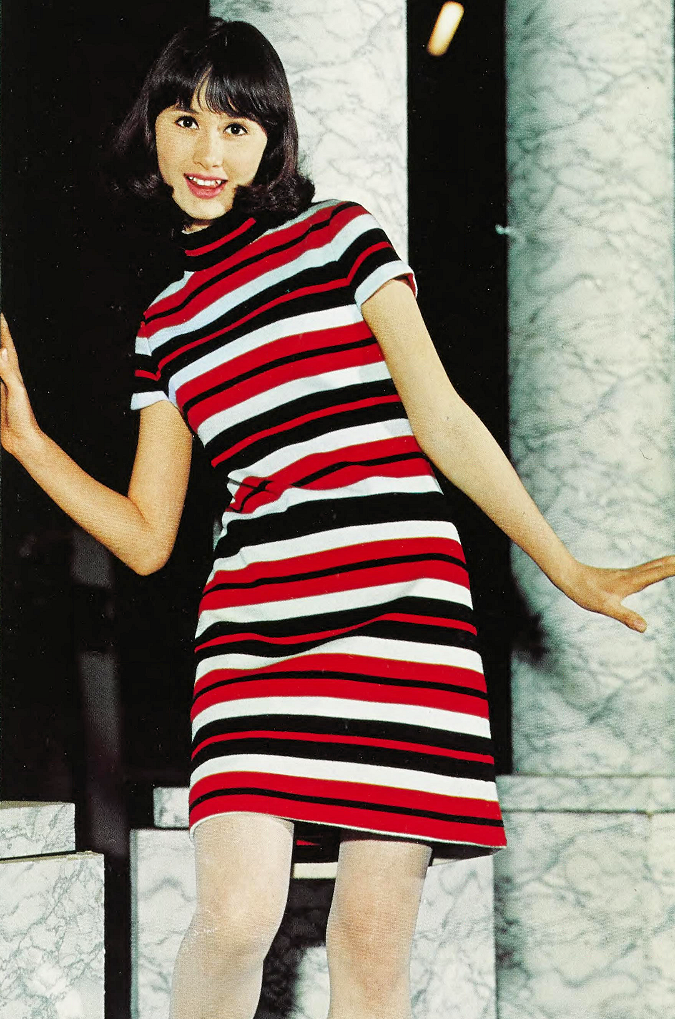
- "Movie Pictorial (Eiga Joho)", December 1967 issue.
- Born: Atsuko Yamamoto; March 4, 1951 (age 75); Kokura, Fukuoka, Japan
- Occupations: Model; singer
- Agent: Linda Music Office
- Height: 168 cm (5 ft 6 in)
- Spouse: Mitsuhiko Inaba
- Musical career
- Genres: J-pop; kayōkyoku
- Instrument: Vocals
- Years active: 1966–present
- Label: Pony Canyon; Tokuma Japan

Japanese name
- Kanji: 山本 リンダ
- Hiragana: やまもと りんだ
- Katakana: ヤマモト リンダ
Transcriptions
- Romanization: Yamamoto Linda
- Website: www.linda-yamamoto.com

Linda Yamamoto (山本リンダ, Yamamoto Rinda)) is a Japanese singer and model whose latest hit song was "Nerai uchi" (狙いうち; meaning "Sharpshoot") in 1973.

== Biography ==
Yamamoto was born March 4, 1951, in Kitakyushu to a Japanese mother and an American father. Her father was a U.S. serviceman who died in the Korean War when she was only two years old. Yamamoto moved to Yokohama as a child. She began modeling when just eleven years old, first becoming known after an appearance in the popular fashion magazine, Soen. She was scouted to become a singer, and in 1966 made her debut single "Komacchau na", which promptly sold over a million copies. Yamamoto continued her modeling career, and as such her modeling career rocketed. A contemporary of Twiggy, she began to be called "the Japanese Twiggy", and the two made some appearances together. About a year after her debut, Yamamoto did a six show tour of the United States, which included stops in New York City and San Francisco. All attempts at a follow-up hit fizzled, however.

She stayed busy with her singing career, however, with some appearances in musicals and on television, but was not getting near the top of the charts. In 1972, she made the first of her numerous comebacks, with the smash hit single "Donimo Tomaranai", which became the second biggest hit of her career. The song was written by the accomplished writing team of Yū Aku and Shunichi Tokora, who also wrote hits for Pink Lady, Finger 5, and Momoe Yamaguchi. They later wrote more songs for Yamamoto, including "Jin Jin Sasete", "Kuruwasetai no", and "Nerai uchi". Yamamoto also had a brief turn as a voice actress in 1974, providing the speaking and singing voice of Princess Margaret in Gisaburo Sugii's anime movie version of Jack and the Beanstalk. She also played the character of Mari in the original Kamen Rider TV series starting in 1971.

However good her songs and singing might have been, what people talked about most was the way she looked. Her stage costume of the time revealed her bellybutton, which became known as "heso dashi". For the times it was considered a very sexy, provocative look, bordering on scandalous, and "heso dashi" became the topic of much media discussion. In the 1970s she began spending a good deal of time doing a stage revue type show, often at famed the Crystal Room in Akasaka. Her shows were consistently popular, and the media began calling her "queen of revue". In 1989 she also started adding chanson to her repertoire, for which she won critical and popular acclaim.

During the 1990s Yamamoto was mostly coasting on her successful past. Even a photo book of nudes only caused a small ripple of new interest. The durable star's career was once again revived, however, this time by a little girl named Chibi Maruko-chan. In her popular anime television program, Maruko-chan would sometimes imitate Yamamoto's songs and dance routines, which again spurred interest, and what finally became another full-fledged Yamamoto revival boom.

In 2001 Yamamoto tied up with the popular Harajuku toy store Kiddyland to make a line of Linda goods. She also married for the first time that year, at the age of 50, to a college professor seven years her senior. In 2005 she became the "image character" for Wanda coffee. Throughout her career, Yamamoto has appeared on Kohaku Uta Gassen five times. Her greatest hit, "Nerai Uchi", was featured prominently in episode 48 of Ultraman Taro, used as a brass band version in the anime Ace of Diamond and is one of the songs in the Nintendo DS game Osu! Tatakae! Ouendan.

== Filmography ==
Year	Title	Role	Notes
1967	Kureji no Kaitô Jibako		
1967	Hana to kaijitsu	Model	
1968	Omoide no yubiwa	Mari Hirose	
1969	Ochiba to kuchizuke	Manager	
1971	Kamen Rider	Mari	22 episodes
1974	Jack and the Beanstalk	Margaret	Voice
1976	Tekiya no Ishimatsu	Machiko	

== Kōhaku Uta Gassen Appearances ==
Year	#	Song	No.	VS	Remarks
1967 (Showa 42)/18th	1	Komacchau na (こまっちゃうナ)	3/23	Yamada Tarou	
1972 (Showa 47)/23rd	2	Dounimo Tomaranai (どうにもとまらない)	8/23	Kiyohiko Ozaki	Returned after 5 years
1973 (Showa 48)/24th	3	Nerai Uchi (狙いうち)	11/23	Shiro Miya	
1974 (Showa 49)/25th	4	Yamiyo Ni Dokkiri (闇夜にドッキリ)	11/25	Kenichi Mikawa	
1991 (Heisei 3)/42nd	5	Dounimo Tomaranai~Nerai Uchi (どうにもとまらない〜狙いうち)	11/28	Tunnels	Returned after 17 years
