= Hiromichi Mogaki =

Japanese television producer

Hiromichi Mogaki (茂垣弘道, Mogaki Hiromichi) is an animation producer currently working as a director for Studio Comet.

== Productions ==
Credits are for producer unless otherwise specified.

- Ashita Tenki ni Naare
- Captain Tsubasa: Ayaushi! Zen Nippon Jr.
- Captain Tsubasa: Europe Daikessen
- Chargeman Ken!
- Cho Hatsumei Boy Kanipan
- Dr. Rin ni Kiite Mite!
- Hatsumei Boy Kanipan (associate producer)
- High School! Kimengumi (TV series and movie)
- The Little Prince
- Mamotte! Lollipop (animation coordinator)
- Manga Nihonshi
- Meimon! Daisan Yakyūbu
- Sasuga no Sarutobi
- Tsuyoshi Shikkari Shinasai
