= Zen-chan Tsū-chan =

Japanese anime television series

Zen-chan Tsū-chan, (Japanese: ゼンちゃんツーちゃん) was a mini-anime series that was broadcast by Nippon Television and produced by Jihō Eigaisha, it was broadcast from October 20, 1969, to January 17, 1970. A 15-minute traffic safety film was made in 1971 as part of a traffic accident prevention campaign program (combining anime and live-action).

== Content ==
The series focused on security issues regarding traffic incidents.

== Survival status ==
The entire material related to the series appears to be lost, beside newspaper ads advertising the show. No footage of the series has resurfaced since it last aired on Yomiuri Television in 1978.
