= Happy Days (1936 film) =

- Directed by: Ub Iwerks
- Produced by: Ub Iwerks
- Starring: Tommy Bupp
- Music by: Carl W. Stalling
- Distributed by: Celebrity Productions
- Release date: September 30, 1936
- Running time: 9:12
- Language: English

Happy Days is a 1936 animated short film directed by Ub Iwerks and part of the ComiColor cartoon series.

The film was the last in the ComiColor and intended as a pilot for a series that Iwerks wanted to animate, based on Gene Byrnes's strip Reg'lar Fellers. The series was scheduled for the 1936–37 season, but never materialized.

The Cartoon

== Plot ==
A group of children purchase a run-down old touring car, for 50 cents down, from a seedy used car dealer. Their inexperience with cars, coupled with the vehicle's mechanical unsoundness, leads to them driving it off a cliff.
