= Jihō Eigasha =

Japanese film company

Jihō Eigasha (Japanese: 時報映画社), was a Japanese film company that produced educational and animated films. They were most notable for producing low-budget animated series, such as Hoshi no Ko Poron and Gan to Gon, in which they relied heavily on limited animation and minimal plots.

== List of works ==
=== Anime ===
- Zen-chan Tsū-chan (1969)
- Gan to Gon (1971, animation produced by Nippon Douga.)
- Hoshi no Ko Poron (1974, animation produced by Nippon Douga.)

=== Movies ===
- Zen-chan no Koutsu Nikki (1962, puppet animation, distributed by Eiken.)
- Zen-chan Tsu-chan (1971, distributed by Eiken.)
- Tsu-chan Toisshou ni Shiyou (1973, distributed by Eiken.)
- Yacchan the Dragonfly (1973, distributed by Eiken.)
