= Reg'lar Fellers =

American comic strip by Gene Brynes

- Author: Gene Byrnes
- Current status/schedule: Concluded daily & Sunday strip
- Launch date: 1917
- End date: January 18, 1949
- Alternate names: (daily) It's a Great Life If You Don't Weaken (1917–1920); (Sunday) Wide Awake Willie (1919–1920)
- Syndicate(s): Bell Syndicate (1917–1924); George Matthew Adams Service (1924–1929); King Features (1929–1942); Associated Newspapers (1942–1949)
- Publisher(s): Cupples & Leon, Big Little Books, Whitman Publishing, Eastern Color Printing, Dell Comics, DC Comics, Standard Comics
- Genre(s): Humor, Children

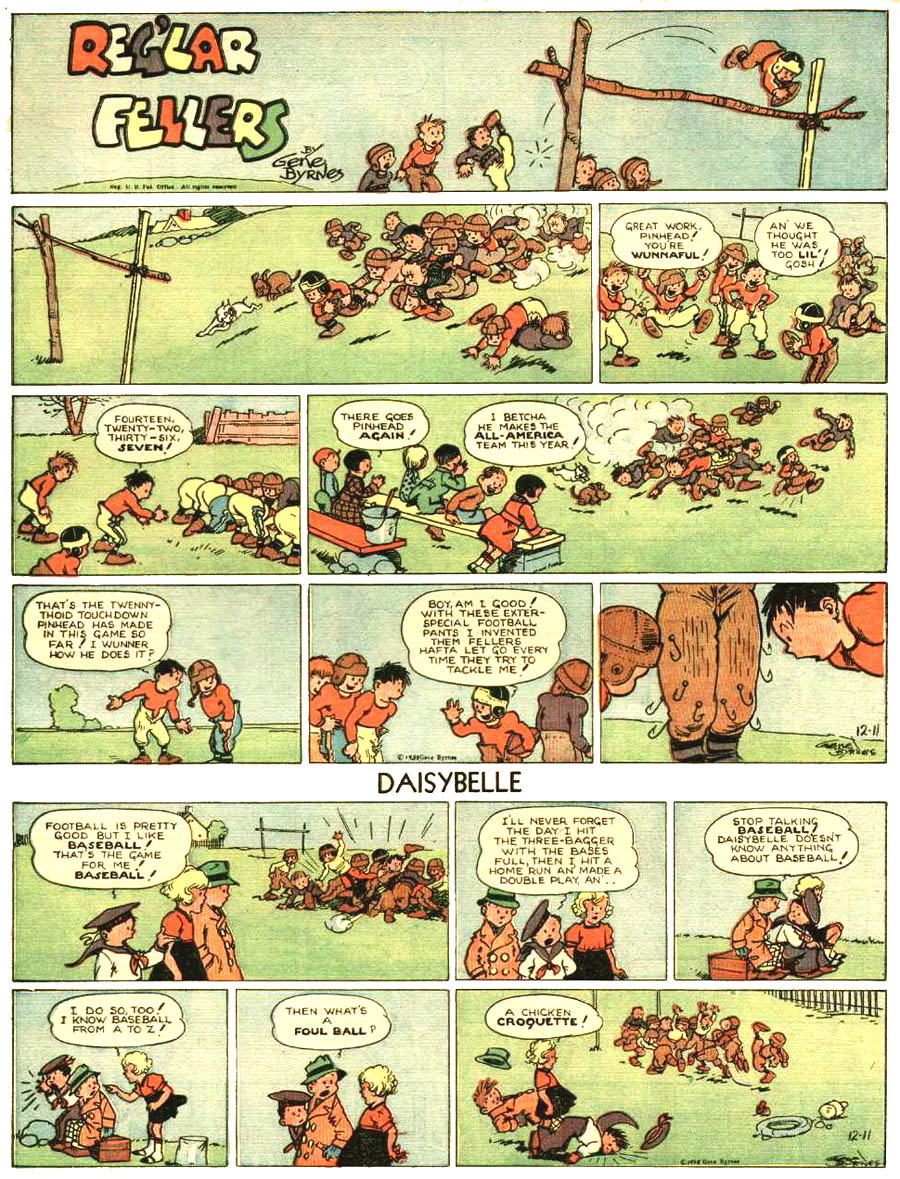
Gene Byrnes' page with Reg'lar Fellers and Daisybelle (December 11. 1938)

Reg'lar Fellers is a long-running newspaper comic strip adapted into a feature film, a radio series on the NBC Red Network, and two animated cartoons. Created by Gene Byrnes (1889–1974), the comic strip offered a humorous look at a gang of suburban children (who nevertheless spoke like New York street kids). Syndicated from 1917 to January 18, 1949, Byrnes's strip was collected into several books. Branding also extended to such items as baseball bats and breakfast cereal.

== Publication history ==
While working as a sports cartoonist with the New York Telegram, Byrnes created his cartoon panel It's a Great Life If You Don't Weaken which introduced the Reg'lar Fellers characters in 1917. He began Wide Awake Willie as a New York Herald Sunday page in 1919, and this too featured Reg'lar Fellers characters. With Reg'lar Fellers distributed by the Bell Syndicate as a daily strip in 1920, Byrnes changed the name of the Sunday strip to Reg'lar Fellers. At its peak, the strip was syndicated in 800 newspapers. It was imitated by other strips, notably Ad Carter's Just Kids.

Reg'lar Fellers had several topper strips on the Sunday page: Draw It Y'self (May 1, 1932 - Sept 2, 1934), Daisybelle (Sept 9, 1934 - 1940/41), Dizzie Lizzie (1940/41 - 1942) and Zoolie (Feb 6, 1944 - Jan 1949).

== Characters and story ==
The characters include leader Jimmy Dugan, sidekick Puddinhead Duffy, Puddinhead's little brother Pinhead, Bullseye the dog and the gang's girl member, Angie Riley.

== Collected editions and comic books ==
Cupples & Leon published four collections of Reg'lar Fellers reprints between 1921 and 1929. Two Big Little Books, from different publishers, were published during the 1930s. Reg'lar Fellers Story Paint Book was published by Whitman Publishing in 1932. One curious hardcover book published during World War II brought together colorful Reg'lar Fellers episodes of kids playing soldiers in backyards with black-and-white World War II combat photographs.

Reg'lar Fellers of America was an athletic organization founded by Clair F. Bee, the Director of Health Education at Long Island University. Reg'lar Fellers of America was planned to develop summer recreation for 12- to 15-year-olds through competitive sports, and Eastern Color Printing's Reg'lar Fellers Heroic Comics promoted the organization to the nation's youth beginning in 1940. Reg'lar Fellers remained in the title logo for the first 15 issues, which also displayed a seal with an eagle and a shield along with the words "Reg'lar Fellers of America". "The Official Publication of Reg'lar Fellers" was the cover blurb until issue 15; the title was shortened to Heroic Comics with issue 16.

In other comic books, Reg'lar Fellers was reprinted in Dell Comics' Popular Comics beginning in #9 (November, 1936), which also featured reprints of Dick Tracy, Tailspin Tommy, Winnie Winkle and other strips. Reg'lar Fellers next appeared in the first issue (April, 1939) of DC Comics's All-American Comics. Standard Comics published two issues of Reg'lar Fellers in its own 1946–47 title.

== In other media ==
=== Films ===
In addition to book reprints and comic books, the strip was adapted to both animation and live-action films.

Ub Iwerks produced the animated adaptation, Happy Days, released on September 30, 1936, as the last ComiColor Cartoon short.

Walter Lantz also produced an animated short, Boy Meets Dog!, an unreleased 1938 commercial for Ipana toothpaste. It eventually got released on the home-movie market (with the Ipana toothpaste billboard scene removed) by Castle Films.

Arthur Dreifuss' live-action feature Reg'lar Fellers (1941) stars Billy Lee as Pinhead Duffy and Carl "Alfalfa" Switzer as Bump Hudson.

=== Radio ===
The Reg'lar Fellers comedy radio series, sponsored by Jell-O, aired Sunday nights on NBC Radio from June 8 to August 31, 1941, as a summer replacement for The Jack Benny Program. Dickie Van Patten and Dickie Monahan starred as Jimmy and Dinky Dugan. Others in the cast included Joyce Van Patten, Patsy O'Shea and Skippy Homeier.

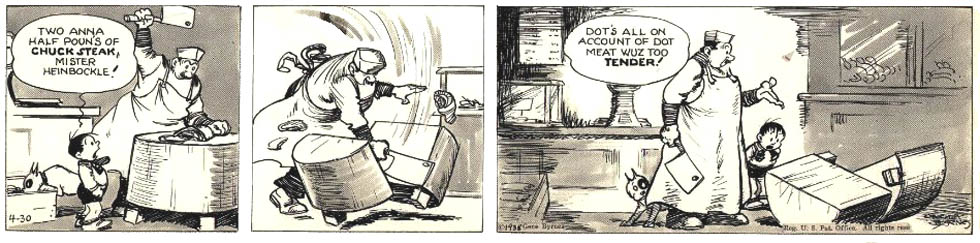
Gene Byrnes Reg'lar Fellers (April 30, 1938)
