= Around the World with Peynet's Lovers =

1974 film

- Japanese poster
- Directed by: Cesare Perfetto
- Screenplay by: Bruno Paolinelli; Cesare Perfetto
- Starring: Serena Verdirosi; Massimo Turci
- Edited by: Bruno Paolinelli
- Music by: Alessandro Alessandroni; Ennio Morricone
- Production company: Nuovi Orientamenti Cinematografici
- Distributed by: Istituto Luce
- Release dates: 1 April 1974 (Cannes); 15 June 1974 (Japan); 4 January 1975 (Italy)
- Running time: 82 minutes
- Country: Italy
- Language: Italian

Il giro del mondo degli innamorati di Peynet, internationally released as Around the World with Peynet's Lovers and The Turn of the World of the Sweethearts of Peynet, is a 1974 Italian animation film directed by Cesare Perfetto and based on the creations of the French illustrator Raymond Peynet.

== Plot ==
The young French fiancés Valentino and Valentina leave Paris for a trip around the world in search of love. The two visit Africa, Europe and Asia, observing the funniest features of various cultures, but without finding love. Finally, they return to Paris.

== Voice cast ==
- Serena Verdirosi as Valentina
- Massimo Turci as Valentino

== Production ==
The making of the film lasted two years. According to Peynet, who participated in the production, the work does not intend to convey any message, but simply be a hymn to the most natural love.

== Music ==
While the soundtrack was composed by Alessandro Alessandroni, the main theme of the film was composed by Ennio Morricone. The song A Flower's All You Need, sung by Demis Roussos, was reused for the film Last Stop on the Night Train (1975).

== Release ==
The film premiered on April 1, 1974 on the ocean liner Raffaello, which left Genoa and stopped in Cannes. The film was released in Japan on June 15, 1974. In Italy, after being screened at film festivals, it was theatrically released on January 4, 1975.
