= Gan to Gon =

Japanese anime television series

ガンとゴン
- Genre: Comedy
- Anime television series
- Written by: Tetsuyoshi Ônuki; Setsuko Murayama
- Studio: Nihon Douga; Jiho Eigasha
- Original network: AKT; SBS; Fuji TV; TV Tokyo
- Original run: April 5, 1974 – August 13, 1975
- Episodes: 260

Gan to Gon (ガンとゴン; lit. Gan & Gon) is a Japanese comedy anime series produced by Jiho Eigasha. Its 260 episodes were aired from April 5, 1974, to August 13, 1975, at a length of around five minutes each.

== Characters ==
Gan (ガン) Voiced by: Toshiko Miura
Gan is the pragmatic and responsible member of the pair, often serving as the voice of reason amidst Gon's wild antics. Despite his initial reservations, Gan's loyalty to his friend always prevails, leading to heartwarming moments of camaraderie and friendship.
Gon (ゴン) Voiced by: Hiroya Kozawa
Gon is the carefree and spontaneous counterpart to Gan. With his infectious enthusiasm and quick wit, he injects excitement and unpredictability into their adventures. Though his impulsive nature may sometimes land them in trouble, Gon's unwavering optimism and resourcefulness never fail to save the day.

Lala (ラーラ) Voiced by: Kuniko Kashii

An Indian girl with a long nose

Gunman (ガンマン) Voiced by: unknown

An enemy of Gan and Gon, and Lala.

Chief (酋長) Voiced by: unknown

Another enemy of Gan and Gon, an Indian Chief who teams up with gunman.

== Staff ==
- Writers: Tetsuyoshi Ônuki, Setsuko Murayama
- Character Design: Tōki Kuwashima
- Key Animation: Takao Suzuki
- Animation: Sumio Iwasaki, Tetsuyoshi Chyōshi, Fumio Sakai, Atsuko Nakajima
- Camera: Masayuki Hattori
- Animation Production: Nihon Doga
- Produced by Jiho Eigasha

== Plot ==
''Gan to Gon'' follows the adventures of Gan and Gon, a quirky duo on a worldwide quest for treasure. Gan, an unsightly yet kind-hearted man of justice, harbors a love for adventure but often finds himself lost in his scatterbrained thoughts. On the other hand, Gon is primarily focused on sleep but surprises with ingenious ideas when the situation demands it.

Throughout the series, Gan and Gon encounter a plethora of challenges, adversaries, and mysteries as they journey across various landscapes and locales. From ancient fortresses to tropical islands, each episode presents the duo with new adventures and unexpected encounters.Their quests lead them to uncover hidden treasures, confront dangerous adversaries, and navigate through perilous situations. Along the way, they demonstrate bravery, cunning, and camaraderie, forging a strong bond as they face the trials and tribulations of their adventures together.

Despite their differences, Gan and Gon complement each other perfectly, with Gan's adventurous spirit balancing Gon's practicality. Together, they embark on a series of escapades filled with excitement, humor, and heartwarming moments, captivating audiences with their unorthodox approach to treasure hunting.

As the series progresses, Gan and Gon's adventures not only entertain but also impart valuable lessons about friendship, courage, and perseverance. Whether unraveling the mysteries of ancient ruins or outwitting cunning adversaries, Gan and Gon's exploits captivate viewers of all ages, making ''Gan to Gon'' a beloved classic in the realm of children's anime.

== Recent Status ==
While some episodes of "Hoshi no Ko Poron" have been discovered and made available online, complete copies of "Gan to Gon" episodes remain elusive. However, a breakthrough occurred when a user named "morikawa" revealed possession of an episode of "Himitsu Sentai Gorenger," indicating the existence of at least one episode of "Gan to Gon."

In June 2014, a 16mm master copy surfaced on Yahoo! Auctions Japan, providing hope for uncovering more episodes. Subsequently, during a Niconico livestream on December 24, 2016, titled "Hoshi no Ko Poron livestream," an episode titled "Protect the Oasis" was showcased. This discovery sparked further interest and efforts to recover additional episodes.

Following these developments, another user managed to find and upload seven more episodes, with releases scheduled every other Saturday until April 8, 2017. These findings represent significant progress in the search for "Gan to Gon" episodes and offer hope for the eventual recovery of the complete series.

== Episodes ==
The following is a list of episodes for "Gan to Gon," including their original titles, English translations, and air dates. The air dates were taken from the Toyama TV re-airing of the series:

Episode #	Original title (Japanese)	English translation	Air date
1	嵐を呼ぶアパッチ機	"Apache Machine Calling a Storm"	November 1, 1972
2	最後のカケ	"The Last Bet"	November 2, 1972
3	消えた名刀	"The Lost Sword"	November 3, 1972
4	金貨とダイナマイト	"Gold Coin and Dynamite"	November 6, 1972
5	ライオン砦の秘密	"Secret of Fort Lion"	November 7, 1972
6	燃える水たまり	"Burning Puddle"	November 8, 1972
7	古寺の決闘	"Battle in Old Temple"	November 9, 1972
8	英雄になったガンとゴン	"Gan and Gon Who Became Heroes"	November 10, 1972
9	熱砂のたたかい	"Fighting Hot Sand"	November 13, 1972
10	ニセモノとホン物	"Fake and Genuine Items"	November 14, 1972
11	ハワイの休日	"Holidays in Hawaii"	November 15. 1972
12	地中海二人ぼっち	"Mediterranean Two People"	November 16, 1972
13	霧の館	"Misty Mansion"	November 17, 1972
14	なぞの古城	"Mysterious Old Castle"	November 20, 1972
15	黒人の島	"Isle of Black People"	November 21, 1972
16	ロデオと男	"Rodeo and Man"	November 22, 1972
17	姫を助けろ	"Rescue the Princess"	November 23, 1972
18	ギャング対ガンとゴン	"Gang vs. Gan and Gon	November 24, 1972
19	ド根性	"Guts"	November 27, 1972
20	帰ってきた金貨の袋	"The Gold Coin Bag That Came Back"	November 28, 1972
21	満月すすきが原"	"Full Moon Susukigahara"	November 29, 1972
22	シルクハットの男	"Man Wearing Silk Hat"	November 30, 1972
23	失せ物探し	"Searching for Lost Items"	December 1, 1972
24	対決	"Showdown"	December 4, 1972
25	ド(ラ)キュラー現わる	"The D(ra)cula Appears"	December 5, 1972
26	怪しい蛇使い	"Suspicious Snake Tamer"	December 6, 1972
27	男と男	"Man and Man"	December 7, 1972
28	赤い手帳のナゾ	"Mystery of Red Notebook"	December 8, 1972
29	Unknown Title	Unknown Title	December 11, 1972
30	ラーラとの出合い	"Meeting with Lala"	December 12, 1972
31	ヤマ(or ママ or ヤム)族の反撃	"Yama(or Mama or Yamu) Tribes' Counterattack "	December 13, 1972
32	ある日どこかで	"One Day Somewhere "	December 14, 1972
33	満月ススキ原	"Full Moon Susukihara"	December 15, 1972
34	影	Shadow"	December 18, 1972
35	酒とダイヤモンド	Alcohol and Diamond"	December 19, 1972
36	泣くな忍者	"Don't Cry Ninja"	December 20, 1972
37	光る山	"Shining Mountain "	December 21, 1972
38	ペンダントをよこせ	"Give me a Pendant"	December 22, 1972
39	消えたゴン	"Disappeared Gon"	December 25, 1972
40	にくしみに対面	"Facing Hatred"	December 26, 1972
41	謎のトルコ石	"Mysterious Turquoise"	December 27, 1972
42	眠れる森	"Sleeping Forest"	December 28, 1972
43	まきこまれたガンとゴン	"Gan and Gon Involved"	December 29, 1972
44	Unknown Title	Unknown Title	January 1, 1973
45	Unknown Title	Unknown Title	January 2, 1973
46	Unknown Title	Unknown Title	January 3, 1973
47	Unknown Title	Unknown Title	January 4, 1973
48	人喰い草の恐怖	"Horror of Human Eating Plant"	January 5, 1973
49	友情の翼で	"With Friendship Wings"	January 8, 1973
50	激突	"Crash"	January 9, 1973
51	あの子はどこかで	"That Girl Somewhere"	January 10, 1973
52	船の墓場	"Ship's Graveyard"	January 11, 1973
53	オアシスを守れ	"Protect the Oasis"	January 12, 1973
54	Unknown Title	Unknown Title	January 15, 1973
55	火攻め水攻め	"Fire Attack Water Attack"	January 16, 1973
56	大決闘	"Great Battle"	January 17, 1973
57	ガンの秘密	"Gan's Secret"	January 18, 1973
58	二人の青春	"Two People's Youth"	January 19, 1973
59	止まらないこと	"Do Not Stop"	January 22, 1973
60	危険が追っていた	"The Danger Was Pursuing"	January 23, 1973
61	空中戦	"Air Battle"	January 24, 1973
62	老インデ(ィ)アンの死	"The Death of the Old Indian"	January 25, 1973
63	三度笠だよガンとゴン	"It's a Sandogasa, Gan and Gon"	January 26, 1973
64	落日の決闘	"Battle of Sunset"	January 29, 1973
65	でき心	"Sudden Impulse"	January 30, 1973
66	一番勝負	"The Single Roud Battle"	January 31, 1973
67	香港の夜	"Hong Kong Night"	February 1, 1973
68	ドライバーだよ...	"It's a Driver..."	February 2, 1973
69	港町ブルース	"Port City Blues"	February 5, 1973
70	指	"Finger"	February 6, 1973
71	"旅は道連れ	"Travel Companion"	February 7, 1973
72	迷路	"Maze"	February 8, 1973
73	二人の関係	"Relationship Between the Two"	February 9, 1973
74	金もうけ	"Making Money"	February 12, 1973
75	消えた日記帳	"Disappeared Diary "	February 13, 1973

== Episode Summaries ==
Due to the rarity of the series and the limited availability of episodes, there are currently no other videos or recordings of "Gan to Gon" readily accessible. The series, originally aired in the early 1970s, has become a subject of interest among collectors and enthusiasts due to its scarcity. Despite efforts to locate additional episodes, only a few have been recovered and made available to the public. This scarcity adds to the intrigue surrounding the series and contributes to its status as a sought-after piece of anime history.

Episode Summaries:

- Protect the Oasis (オアシスを守れ Oashisu o Mamore)
  - Gan and Gon stumble upon an oasis in the desert and encounter a group of mischievous monkeys wreaking havoc. Determined to protect the oasis from destruction, Gan and Gon devise a plan to outsmart the monkeys and restore peace to the tranquil oasis.
- Bag of Gold Coins Came (帰ってきた金貨の袋)
  - A mysterious bag of gold coins suddenly appears in the village, sparking a frenzy among the residents. Gan and Gon find themselves embroiled in a comedic treasure hunt as they race against time and a cast of eccentric characters to uncover the truth behind the magical bag of riches.
- Gold & Dynamite (金貨とダイナマイト)
  - Gan and Gon stumble upon a hidden stash of gold coins buried deep underground. However, their discovery attracts the attention of a band of bumbling bandits who are determined to steal the treasure for themselves. With cunning and wit, Gan and Gon must outmaneuver the thieves and protect the gold from falling into the wrong hands.

== See also ==
- Hoshi no Ko Poron
