= Chargeman Ken! =

1974 sci-fi anime TV series

- Cover for the First DVD Volume.

チャージマン研！ (Chājiman Ken!)
- Genre: Science fiction
- Created by: Eiji Tanaka; Tetsuji Suzukawa
- Anime television series
- Directed by: Noboru Miura
- Produced by: Hiromichi Mogaki
- Written by: Masaaki Wakuda; Toyohiro Andō; Yoshio Tamado
- Music by: Kunio Miyauchi
- Studio: Knack Productions; Tama Production
- Licensed by: NA: Discotek Media
- Original network: First-run syndication
- Original run: April 1, 1974 – June 28, 1974
- Episodes: 65
- Manga
- Written by: Kiyotaka Arashi
- Illustrated by: Kiyotaka Arashi (ch. 1–2); Ryū Morio (ch. 3–6)
- Published by: Tokuma Shoten
- Magazine: TV Land
- Original run: March 1, 1974 – August 1, 1974
- Volumes: 1
- Manga
- Written by: Ikuo Miyazoe
- Published by: Akita Shoten
- Magazine: Bōken Ō
- Original run: April 1, 1974 – July 1, 1974
- Volumes: 1

Chargeman Ken! (チャージマン研(けん)！, Chājiman Ken!) is a science fiction anime series created by Tetsuji Suzukawa and Eiji Tanaka and animated by Knack Productions (now ICHI Corporation) and Tama Production. It was directed by Noboru Miura and written by Masaaki Wakuda, Toyohiro Andō and Yoshio Tamado, with the characters designed by Tanaka. A total of 65 episodes were broadcast in syndication on various networks (it was broadcast in the Kantō region on TBS) from April 1 to June 28, 1974, in 10-minute slots from 5:30 to 5:40 PM, Monday through Friday. Each episode of the series is a self-contained story. Discotek Media currently licenses the series outside Japan. The anime was released to obscurity, but later gained cult attention for its extremely low budget and poor storytelling.

== Plot ==
The story takes place in the year 2074, in a futuristic city where science has developed by leaps and bounds, and the Duralian aliens are planning to invade Earth. 10-year-old Ken Izumi disguises himself as Chargeman and struggles to protect the Earth from the threat of the Duralians.

== Characters ==
=== Izumi family ===
Ken Izumi (泉 研, Izumi Ken)
voiced by Setsuko Takemoto
The protagonist of the franchise, a 5th grade student at Yoi Elevator school, somewhere in Japan. Ken is extremely powerful, able to inflict debilitating punches on a Duralian who has been credibly disguised as a boxing champion. He has the ability to transform into Chargeman Ken when exposed to even a minuscule amount of light, though the total lack of it has prevented him from transforming several times. As Chargeman Ken, he has the mount Sky Rod and carries the Alpha Gun, both of which can instantly kill Duralians by a beam-like attack, and wears the Vizum Belt that can make a lethal vortex of wind. He kills Duralians indiscriminately, even if they are not attacking or are running away. There are several instances of his dispensing with large amounts of hostages in ruthless attacks on Duralian fortifications and transports. Ken's only admitted weakness per se is mathematics, but his hatred for tomato juice has been used to identify his imposter.
Caron Izumi (泉 キャロン, Izumi Kyaron)
Ken's 7-year-old sister. She has compassion for animals and is often supportive of her brother.
Barican (バリカン, Barican)
voiced by Fuyuki Takahashi
Ken's robot companion.
Hiroshi Izumi (泉 博, Izumi Hiroshi)
voiced by Kiyoshi Kawanishi
Ken and Caron's father. He is described as a physician, though he has never been shown practicing medicine in the anime series. Indeed, his wife has forgotten his profession, and he himself commented on a mental hospital in a derogatory fashion.
Saori Izumi (泉 さおり, Izumi Saori)
voiced by Yuki Aida
Ken and Caron's mother and Hiroshi's wife.

=== Duralians ===
Maou (魔王, Maō)
voiced by Noboru Sato
The chief antagonist of the franchise, leader of the Duralians invading Earth. Atypical for Duralians, Maou has two eyes.
Duralians (ジュラル星人, Juraru seijin)
Duralians are vaguely humanoid, maroon-colored, with a slim waist, broad chest, long, tentacle-like limbs, and have a single eye capable of emitting a beam-like attack that can disintegrate any life form it hits and do severe damage to structural members of buildings and towers. They have the ability to transform into other lifeforms, such as humans or horses. Duralians do not have reflections in mirrors, a characteristic used by Ken and other protagonists to distinguish them from humans and robots.

== Episode list ==
No.	Title	Original release date
1	"Danger!! The Children's Space Station" "Kiki!! Kodomo Uchū Sutēshon" (Japanese: 危機!! 子供宇宙ステーション)	April 1, 1974
2	"Safe by a Hair!" "Kiki Ippatsu" (Japanese: 危機一髪!!)	April 2, 1974
3	"The Butterfly Swarm Flutters!" "Chō no Taigun ga Mau" (Japanese: 蝶の大群が舞う)	April 3, 1974
4	"The Mysterious Handsome Boy" "Nazo no Bishōnen" (Japanese: 謎の美少年)	April 4, 1974
5	"Terror! The Mummy Comes by Carriage!" "Kyōfu! Mīra ga Basha de Yattekuru" (Japanese: 恐怖! ミイラが馬車でやってくる)	April 5, 1974
6	"Uncanny! The Space Botanical Garden" "Kaiki! Uchū Shokubutsu-en" (Japanese: 怪奇! 宇宙植物園)	April 8, 1974
7	"Man of the West Ken!" "Seibu no Otoko・Ken!" (Japanese: 西部の男・研!)	April 9, 1974
8	"Duralian X-6" "Juraru Seijin X-6-gō" (Japanese: ジュラル星人X-6号)	April 10, 1974
9	"Enter, the Duralmons!" "Jurarumonsu Tōjō" (Japanese: ジュラルモンス登場)	April 11, 1974
10	"Barican Runs Amuck!" "Barikan Dai Abare!" (Japanese: バリカン大暴れ!)	April 12, 1974
11	"Save the Earth!" "Chikyū o Mamore!" (Japanese: 地球を守れ!)	April 15, 1974
12	"We Can't Eat Vegetable Salad" "Yasai Sarada ga Taberarenai" (Japanese: 野菜サラダが食べられない)	April 16, 1974
13	"Showdown! The Undersea City" "Taiketsu! Kaitei Toshi" (Japanese: 対決! 海底都市)	April 17, 1974
14	"The Great Buddha that Vanished Into the Night" "Yamiyo ni Kieta Daibutsu" (Japanese: 闇夜に消えた大仏)	April 18, 1974
15	"The Art Gallery Mystery!" "Bijutsukan no Kai!" (Japanese: 美術館の怪!)	April 19, 1974
16	"Murder Record, Melody of Terror!" "Satsujin Rekōdo Kyōfu no Merodī" (Japanese: 殺人レコード 恐怖のメロディー)	April 22, 1974
17	"Find Ken's Secret!" "Ken no Himitsu o Sagare!" (Japanese: 研の秘密を探れ!)	April 23, 1974
18	"The Great Escape from Prison Island" "Shūjin Tōdai Dassō" (Japanese: 囚人島大脱走)	April 24, 1974
19	"Bank Gang - Caron's in Danger!" "Ginkō Gyangu Kyaron ga Abunai" (Japanese: 銀行ギャング キャロンが危ない)	April 25, 1974
20	"Ken Gets a Girlfriend" "Gārufurendo ga Dekita" (Japanese: ガールフレンドが出来た)	April 26, 1974
21	"Caron's Present" "Kyaron e no Okurimono" (Japanese: キャロンへの贈り物)	April 29, 1974
22	"Time Bomb Fax TV" "Jigen Bakudan Densō Terebi" (Japanese: 時限爆弾電送テレビ)	April 30, 1974
23	"Mental Hospital Terror" "Kyōfu! Seishin Byōin" (Japanese: 恐怖! 精神病院)	May 1, 1974
24	"An Invitation to the Robot Club" "Robotto Kurabu e no Jōtaijō" (Japanese: ロボットクラブへの招待状)	May 2, 1974
25	"Save Young Yuuichi!" "Yūichi Shōnen o Sukue!" (Japanese: 雄一少年を救え!)	May 3, 1974
26	"The Girl Who Lost Her Memory" "Kioku o Nakushita Shōjo" (Japanese: 記憶を無くした少女)	May 6, 1974
27	"The Burning Poison Mushroom House" "Moeru doko Kinoko no Ie" (Japanese: 燃える毒きのこの家)	May 7, 1974
28	"Space Rocket Z9" "Uchū Roketto Z9-gō" (Japanese: 宇宙ロケットZ9号)	May 8, 1974
29	"Rub Out the Fashion Model!" "Fashon Moderu o Kese!" (Japanese: ファッションモデルを消せ!)	May 9, 1974
30	"Save Caron From the Top of the Tower!" "Tō-jō Kyaron o Sukue!" (Japanese: 塔上のキャロンを救え!)	May 10, 1974
31	"Crisis! One Second to Blast" "Kiki! 1-byō Mae" (Japanese: 危機! 爆破1秒前)	May 13, 1974
32	"The Master Safe Cracker" "Kinko-yaburi no Meijin" (Japanese: 金庫破りの名人)	May 14, 1974
33	"Is My Dad Old-Fashioned?" "Boku no Papa wa Jidaiokure?" (Japanese: 僕のパパは時代おくれ?)	May 15, 1974
34	"Sky Rod, Burrow into the Earth's Depths!" "Sukai Roddo Chitei ni Tsukkome!" (Japanese: スカイロッド 地底に突っこめ!)	May 16, 1974
35	"Dynamite in the Brain!" "Atama no Naka ni Dainamaito" (Japanese: 頭の中にダイナマイト)	May 17, 1974
36	"Shudder! The Devil's Hospital" "Senritsu! Akuma no Byōin" (Japanese: 戦慄! 悪魔の病院)	May 20, 1974
37	"Beat the Hijack" "Haijakku o Yattsukero!" (Japanese: ハイジャックをやっつけろ!)	May 21, 1974
38	"Operation Duralian Fake Friendship" "Juraru no Nise Yūjō Sakusen" (Japanese: ジュラルのニセ友情作戦)	May 22, 1974
39	"The Pretty Boy Robot is a Herald of Death" "Bijin Robotto wa Koroshi no Shisha" (Japanese: 美人ロボットは殺しの使者)	May 23, 1974
40	"Race on Murder Highway" "Shissō! Satsujin Haiu-ei" (Japanese: 疾走! 殺人ハイウェイ)	May 24, 1974
41	"Cinderella Girl" "Shindarera no Shōjo" (Japanese: シンデレラの少女)	May 27, 1974
42	"The Air Force Base is Targeted!" "Kūgun Kichi ga Nera warete iru!" (Japanese: 空軍基地が狙われている!)	May 28, 1974
43	"Peer Through the Camera Viewfinder!" "Kamera no Faindā o Nokoze!" (Japanese: カメラのファインダーを覗け!)	May 29, 1974
44	"Beat the Fake Ken!" "Ken no Nisemono o Yattsukero!" (Japanese: 研の偽者をやっつけろ!)	May 30, 1974
45	"When the Cuckoo Clock Strikes Three" "Hatodokei ga 3-ji o Sashitara" (Japanese: 鳩時計が3時を指したら)	May 31, 1974
46	"Terror! The House of the White-Haired Crone!" "Kyōfu! Shigara Rōba no Ie" (Japanese: 恐怖! 白髪老婆の家)	June 3, 1974
47	"The Great Duralian Counterattack" "Juraru no Dai Gyakushū" (Japanese: ジュラルの大逆襲)	June 4, 1974
48	"Showdown on the Solitary Island!" "Kotō no Taiketsu!" (Japanese: 孤島の対決!)	June 5, 1974
49	"The Delinquent's True Colors" "Furyō Shōnen no Shōtai wa!" (Japanese: 不良少年の正体は!)	June 6, 1974
50	"Save the Orphan Center!" "Minashi-ko Sentā o Sukue!" (Japanese: みなし子センターを救え!)	June 7, 1974
51	"Stray Dog Koro" "Sute Inu Koro" (Japanese: 捨て犬コロ)	June 10, 1974
52	"Blow Up the Undersea Oil Field!" "Kaitei Yuden o Bakuha Shiro!" (Japanese: 海底油田を爆破しろ!)	June 11, 1974
53	"The Suspicious Bride" "Ayashī Hanayome" (Japanese: 怪しい花嫁)	June 12, 1974
54	"Spooky! The Waxwork Museum" "Kaiki! Rō Ningyō-kan" (Japanese: 怪奇! ロウ人形館)	June 13, 1974
55	"The Ones They Met in Egypt" "Ejiputo de Deatta Yatsu" (Japanese: エジプトで出会ったやつ)	June 14, 1974
56	"Runaway! Horseback Ken" "Bōsō! Moue no Ken" (Japanese: 暴走! 馬上の研)	June 17, 1974
57	"The Antarctic Amusement Park" "Nankyoku Yuenchi" (Japanese: 南極遊園地)	June 18, 1974
58	"Circus of Fiends" "Akuma no Sākasu-dan" (Japanese: 悪魔のサーカス団)	June 19, 1974
59	"Forest of Terror" "Kyōfu no Mori" (Japanese: 恐怖の森)	June 20, 1974
60	"Tsunami Attack" "Ōtsunami no Shūgeki" (Japanese: 大津波の襲撃)	June 21, 1974
61	"Barican's Old Friend Pays a Visit" "Barikan no Kyūyū ga Tazunete Kita" (Japanese: バリカンの旧友が尋ねて来た)	June 24, 1974
62	"Crisis at the Agricultural Complex!" "Nōgyō Konbināto no Kiki" (Japanese: 農業コンビナートの危機)	June 25, 1974
63	"Defeat the Murderous Boxer!" "Satsujin Bokusā o Taose!" (Japanese: 殺人ボクサーを倒せ!)	June 26, 1974
64	"Explosion! The Mammoth Control Center" "Bakuhatsu! Mamosu Kontorōru Sentā" (Japanese: 爆発! マンモスコントロールセンター)	June 27, 1974
65	"Victory! Chargeman Ken!" "Shōri! Chājiman Ken" (Japanese: 勝利! チャージマン研)	June 28, 1974

== Broadcast in Japan ==
Area	Station	Timeslot	Network	Notes
Kanto	TBS Television	Weekdays 17:30 - 17:40	JNN	
Hiroshima	Chugoku Broadcasting	April 17 - July 18, 1974	JNN	
Hokkaido	Sapporo Television	Weekdays 7:05 - 7:15	NNS	April 1, 1974 - unknown date
Kinki	Mainichi Broadcasting System	Weekdays 7:10 - 7:20	ANN	April 1 - June 28, 1974 (before the station switched affiliations with ABC the following year)
Fukushima	Fukushima Central Television	Sundays 7:45 - 8:00	NNS; ANN	August 17, 1975 - June 27, 1976, two segments per showing
Akita	Akita Broadcasting System	Irregular broadcast	NNS	
Yamagata	Yamagata Television System	Saturdays 7:45 - 8:00	FNS	Aired during 1975
Ishikawa	Ishikawa TV	Weekdays 16:30 - 16:40	FNS	December 23, 1981 - February 22, 1982
Tottori and Shimane	San-in Central TV		FNS	
Fukuoka	TV Nishinippon		FNS	From April 1, 1974
Okayama	TV Okayama		FNS; ANN	At the time, the station only covered Okayama
Gifu	Gifu Broadcasting System	Weekdays 17:05 - 17:17	Independent	April 10 - May 15, 1975. Withdrawn after 27 episodes.

== Production and cult status ==
Chargeman Ken! features several staff from Astroganger, including Seiichi Nishino, Eiji Tanaka, Toyohiro Andō, and Hiromichi Mogaki. As a result, the anime features similar character designs, story composition and characterization. According to Nishino, the show was produced with the aim of depicting life in the future, based on an illustrated futuristic story by Hiroshi Manabe.

Chargeman Ken! was produced on a budget of 500,000 yen per episode, far lower than the average of 4—5 million yen for a 30-minute episode by 1974. The low budget caused Knack Productions's staff to become apathetic toward the show and largely skip work on it in favor of going to the beach. Much information about the show is still unknown, including the voice actors, who are only listed as "Kindaiza Troupe" (劇団近代座 Gekidan Kindaiza).

Chargeman Ken! remained obscure until 2007, when a two-part DVD box set was released by Line Communications, with the episodes collected on a different order from the initial broadcast. The series became a viral hit on 2channel and Niconico, where users found unintentional comedic value in the show's flaws—including opportunistic and incoherent storytelling, poor pacing, animation inconsistencies, poor voice acting, and artifacts including hairs that appear on the film. It then became an Internet meme, leading to dozens of video remixes and AMVs. On August 20, 2010, almost 40 years after the original broadcast, the first official website for the anime was opened, and on October 27, 2010, the official soundtrack and tribute album "Chargeman Ken! Tribute to Soundtracks vol.1" was released. In response to the boom on the Internet, the show was rebroadcast on AT-X from 2008 to 2009, and on Kids Station from July 2011 to January 2012, with the airing order being the same as that of the original broadcast. Discotek Media released the entire series on DVD in North America on October 31, 2017.

A stage musical based on the series ran from October 31 to November 6, 2019, at Shinjuku FACE in Tokyo. A second musical was staged at Shinjuku FACE from October 10 to October 18, 2020.

On August 3, 2020, ICHI, the production company of the anime, started a crowdfunding campaign on Readyfor to restore and archive the original film reels, which had deteriorated significantly over the years. A Blu-ray box of the show, published by Best Field, was released on June 30, 2021. The release includes all 65 episodes of the anime, including a bonus DVD containing ICHI's pilot films and a slideshow of the characters' model sheets, as well as a booklet featuring an interview with the producer.

Discotek Media released the series on Blu-ray in North America on November 28, 2023.

== See also ==
- Hoshi no Ko Poron
