= Hoshi no Ko Poron =

Japanese anime television series

星の子ポロン
- Genre: Science fiction, Comedy, Education
- Anime television series
- Directed by: Ōnuki Tetsuyoshi; Murayama Setsuko
- Written by: Kuwashima Haruki; Suzuki Takao; Iwasaki Sumio; Choushi Tetsuyoshi; Sakai Fumio; Nakashima Atsuko; Hattori Masayuki
- Music by: Jean-Jacques Perrey; Janko Nilović
- Studio: Nihon Douga; Jiho Eigasha
- Original network: Hokkaido Cultural Broadcasting; TV Tokyo
- Original run: April 1, 1974 – March 21, 1975
- Episodes: 260 (2 segments per episode)

Hoshi no Ko Poron (星の子ポロン; transl. "Star Child Poron") is a Japanese science fiction comedy anime series produced by Jiho Eigasha. Its 260 episodes were aired from April 1, 1974, to March 21, 1975, at a length of around five minutes each, each containing two shorts of at least two minutes in length.

== Plot ==
The titular character, Poron, comes from outerspace to Earth. There, he soon encounters the native life-forms, although as a new arrival, he is unaware that he has ignored humans and instead befriends several animals. The mischievous animal folks, however, keep causing trouble in various places, by their naughty antics and bad behaviors. Poron, though exasperated, secretly unleashes his mysterious power, to save and punish them.

== Characters ==
Poron (ポロン)
Voiced by: Masako Nozawa
An extraterrestrial boy with an antenna growing out of his bald head. He has ability to fly. By emitting light from the stars on the headband he is wearing, he floats objects and changes matters, and settle the problems. He watches over the animal kids, and whenever he sees a young one acting in an unruly manner or in trouble, rushes to the scene. He punishes them and teaches them what they shouldn't do. To accomplish these tasks, he is usually rather ruthless, so the means of his punishment are often quite severe. He loves bananas. There are some episodes where he doesn't intervene, but makes an appearance to utter a few words on the moral of the episode.
Animal Folks (動物たち)
Voiced by: Masako Nozawa, etc.
The animal kids who are the cause of all the troubles and turmoil. They get either saved or punished by Poron.
Narrator (ナレーション)
Voiced by: Masako Nozawa
Besides explaining the plot and current situations to the audience, lectures the animal folks now and then.

== Staff ==
- Writers: Tetsuyoshi Ônuki, Setsuko Murayama
- Character Design: Tōki Kuwashima
- Key Animation: Takao Suzuki
- Animation: Sumio Iwasaki, Tetsuyoshi Chyōshi, Fumio Sakai, Atsuko Nakajima
- Camera: Masayuki Hattori
- Animation Production: Nihon Doga
- Produced by Jiho Eigasha

== Cult status ==
The series has become a popular internet meme due to non-existent plots, poorly drawn characters, and heavy reliance on limited animation which have led to dozens of video remixes and MADs.

== See also ==
- Gan to Gon
- Chargeman Ken!
