= Jack and the Beanstalk (1974 film) =

- Japanese poster for the film

Japanese name
- Kanji: ジャックと豆の木
Transcriptions
- Revised Hepburn: Jakku to Mame no Ki
- Directed by: Gisaburō Sugii
- Written by: Shūji Hirami
- Produced by: Mikio Nakata
- Starring: Masachika Ichimura; Linda Yamamoto
- Cinematography: Kazu Moriyama
- Edited by: Masashi Furukawa
- Music by: Takashi Miki
- Production company: Group TAC
- Distributed by: Nippon Herald Films (Japan); Columbia Pictures (United States)
- Release date: July 20, 1974
- Running time: 96 minutes
- Country: Japan
- Language: Japanese

Jack and the Beanstalk (ジャックと豆の木, Jakku to Mame no Ki) is a 1974 Japanese animated feature film produced by Group TAC (as its debut film), distributed by Nippon Herald Films and directed by Gisaburō Sugii. Styled after classical Western animation, it is a musical fantasy based on the fairy-tale of the same name with the screenplay by Shūji Hirami, music organization by Yū Aku and songs and score composed and arranged by Takashi Miki with Shun'ichi Tokura and Tadao Inōe. It was released in Japan on July 20, 1974 and in the United States by Columbia Pictures in 1976.

== Plot ==
Jack resides with his mother in a small house out in the country. Being very poor, they eventually find themselves forced to sell their cow, which has stopped giving milk. Jack runs into a mysterious man on the way into town and trades the cow for a handful of "magic" beans. Jack's mother becomes angry at him and spanks him with a broom before throwing the beans out the window.

As Jack sleeps, the beanstalk grows, much to the astonishment of Jack's dog, Crosby. Crosby is even more surprised to see a mouse in a dress and hennin named Laura descending the beanstalk. Jack awakens and is also amazed at the sight of the beanstalk. The mouse convinces Jack and Crosby to accompany her up the beanstalk.

Upon arriving at the top, the trio find themselves in the courtyard of a castle, where they find a girl who appears to be in a trance looking at them. The girl, Margaret, is the princess of the castle. Her mother and father have been killed by a Witch, but she claims to be happy since she will soon be marrying her beloved prince, Tulip, whom, unbeknownst to her, is actually a giant. Margaret introduces Jack to Tulip's mother, Madame Alisson "Alice" Hecuba, who herself is actually an evil witch that has put the princess under a spell. The witch aspires to become queen of the Land of the Clouds when Tulip and Margaret are married.

Madame Hecuba takes Jack to an upstairs dining hall, where she feeds him some soup intended to put him to sleep so she can eat him and gain his youth. She has to hide him quickly when Tulip, who is not very bright, arrives upstairs. As he is eating, Tulip smells Jack's presence. Jack manages to escape, much to the chagrin of Hecuba, who orders Tulip to find him and promises to share Jack with him.

In the meantime, Jack meets more clothed mice Nigel, Tammy and George as well as a talking harp. The harp initially starts calling for the giant, but is quick to cooperate when the mice and Jack persuade her that it would be in her best interest. She reveals that Madame Hecuba destroyed the king and queen and turned the people of the castle into mice. Tulip comes into the treasure room and Jack witnesses a golden hen lay a golden egg. The harp also reveals that the witch's spell must be renewed daily.

Jack decides to grab the hen and as much treasure as he can carry and make his way back down the beanstalk. In the process, he tricks Tulip into thinking he fell to his doom. Jack and his mother celebrate their new-found fortune until Crosby persuades Jack that he should stop the princess from marrying the giant.

With fresh determination to help the princess, Jack ascends the beanstalk a second time. He learns from the harp that the spell over the princess can be broken with a kiss from someone who is truly brave. Jack crashes the mock wedding and gives Margaret a kiss. The witch is angered when Margaret returns to normal and recognizes her as her parents' killer, whilst Tulip is enraged that Margaret doesn't actually love him. A chase ensues, and Jack eventually faces Madame Hecuba again. Tulip enters the room and prepares to step on Jack when, at the last moment, fed up with his mother's abusive treatment of him, he turns on her and instead steps on her.

With the witch destroyed, the mice turn back into people and the castle starts to return to normal. The giant is still around, however, and chases Jack and Crosby. The two eventually climb down the beanstalk with Tulip in hot pursuit, and cut the beanstalk down upon reaching the bottom, causing Tulip to fall to his death. Sometime later, Jack and Crosby look up to the clouds, thinking about their friends in the sky.

== Characters ==
- Jack (ジャック, Jakku)

Animated by: Shigeru Yamamoto
Voiced by: Masachika Ichimura (Japanese); Billie Lou Watt (English)

- Margaret (マーガレット, Māgaretto)

Animated by: Tsuneo Maeda
Voiced by: Linda Yamamoto (Japanese); Corinne Orr (English)

- Old bean-seller

Voiced by: Kō Nishimura (Japanese); Ray Owens (English)

- Prince Tulip the giant (巨人 – チューリップ, Kyojin (Chūrippu))

Animated by: Teruhito Ueguchi
Voiced by: Hiroshi Mizushima (Japanese); Ray Owens (English)

- Madam Noir (ノワール夫人, Nowāru-fujin), or Madame Alice Hecuba in the English dub

Animated by: Kazuko Nakamura
Voiced by: Kirin Kiki (Japanese); Billie Lou Watt (English)

- Crosby (グロスビー, Gurosubī)

Animated by: Takateru Miwa
Voiced by: Kazuo Kamimura (Japanese); Jack Grimes (English)

- Harp (たて琴, Tategoto)

Animated by: Kanji Akahori
Voiced by: Nobue Ichitani (Japanese); Billie Lou Watt (English)

- Mother (おっ母, Ohhaha)

Voiced by: Miyoko Asō (Japanese); Billie Lou Watt (English)

- Paper priest (紙の司祭, Kami no shisai)

Voiced by: Takeshi Kusaka

- Kōjō (口上)

Voiced by: Tonpei Hidari

- Mii (ミイ)

Animated by: Toshio Hirata

- The mice (ねずみたち, Nezumi-tachi)

Animated by: Toshio Hirata

- The beanstalk (豆の木, Mame no ki)

Animated by: Kanji Akahori

== Production ==
It is the first feature directed by Sugii and animated by Group TAC and the second film under that arrangement, following as it did the just previously produced half-hour educational film The History of Mutual Aid: The Story of Life Insurance.

== Release ==
As of October 2024, a transfer of the film by Atlas International is available on DVD-Video, with both the English and Japanese audio but only dubtitles, from Hen's Tooth Video UPC 759731409421. There was also a Magic Window VHS released in 1985.

== Soundtrack ==
Musical Fantasy "Jack and the Beanstalk" (Japanese: ミュージカル・ファンタジィ"ジャックと豆の木") was released in Japan in July 1974 by Canyon Records Inc. Catalog# AQ-4001.

=== Track listing ===
No.	Title	Vocal	Length
1.	"Title Kojo" (タイトル・口上)	Tonpei Hidari
2.	"Asa no Uta" (朝の歌)	Film original cast
3.	"Ikite Iku Kimari" (生きて行くきまり)
4.	"Mame Uri no Kyoku" (豆売りの曲)
5.	"Kiseki no Uta" (奇跡の歌)	Linda Yamamoto
6.	"Kanzen ni Shiawase" (完全にしあわせ)	Linda Yamamoto
7.	"Watashi wa Nani Demo Shitte Iru" (私は何でも知っている)	Ichitani Nobue
8.	"Tabete wa Dame yo" (食べては駄目よ)	Ichitani Nobue
9.	"Chu no Sukyatto" (チューのスキャット)	Film original cast
10.	"Omae wa Minikui" (お前はみにくい)	Kirin Kiki
11.	"O Ainiku-sama" (おあいにくさま)	Masachika Ichimura
12.	"Kore ga Seiko no Michi" (これが成功の道)	Kazuo Kamimura
13.	"Kore ga Otoko no Michi" (これが男の道)	Kazuo Kamimura
14.	"Nagaiai no Yume" (長い間の夢)	Kirin Kiki
15.	"Aishitemasu ka" (愛してますか)	Takeshi Kusaka
16.	"Moto e Modori Nasai" (もとへ戻りなさい)
17.	"Kyojin-san Kochira" (巨人さんこちら)	Masachika Ichimura
18.	"Sayonara Jack" (さよならジャック)	Linda Yamamoto & Film original cast
19.	"Oidashi no Uta" (追い出しの歌)	Tonpei Hidari

== Reception ==
The English-dubbed version received mixed opinions from U.S. critics. Henry Herx wrote in his Family Guide to Movies on Video: "Its songs are insipid and the animation rather primitive[;] still it moves along at a lively enough pace and may amuse younger children." Richard Eder of The New York Times remarked: "The lines are blurry, the colors muddy, and the action is blocklike. When the characters' lips move up and down, the words come out sideways." He ended his short review with this comment: "It is the kind of thing grandfathers are sent out to send their grandchildren to. They will sit silently, side by side, and a quiet loathing will come up between them." In 2010, Michael R. Pitts said that the songs are "forgettable". Conversely, the writers of Jerry Beck's Animated Movie Guide hailed it as "A successful Japanese emulation of American fairy-tale theatrical cartoon features with many delightful songs", and gave it four stars.
