= Gene Byrnes =

American cartoonist

- Born: Eugene Francis Byrnes; March 18, 1889 New York City, U.S.
- Died: July 26, 1974 (aged 85) New York City, U.S.
- Area: Cartoonist
- Notable works: Reg'lar Fellers

Eugene Francis Byrnes (March 18, 1889 – July 26, 1974) created the long-running comic strip Reg'lar Fellers, which he signed Gene Byrnes. His humorous look at suburban children (who nevertheless spoke like New York street kids) was syndicated from 1917 to 1949.

== Early life and education ==
Born and educated in New York City, Byrnes was ten years old when he entered a contest that involved drawing a picture in a store window and won the prize, a $5 suit. He took a job as an office boy at McClure's when he was 15, and a year later he went to work in his father's harness business and soon started his own business, making horse collars. He also worked as a bug spray salesman, shoemaker and shoe salesman, introducing electric shoe repairs to New York.

Byrnes planned a career in sports, but after he broke his leg during a wrestling match, he began copying the cartoons of Tad Dorgan while recuperating in the hospital. He was a graduate of the Landon School of Illustration and Cartooning correspondence course, which displayed his name in its advertisements.

== Cartoons to comics ==
Byrnes met Winsor McCay who gave him a letter of recommendation which led to work as a sports cartoonist. At the New York Telegram where Things That Never Happen was part of Byrnes' larger feature, It's A Great Life If You Don't Weaken, syndicated by the New York Evening Telegram from 1915 to 1919. In 1917, this cartoon feature introduced the Reg'lar Fellers characters.

In 1919, he began Wide Awake Willie as a New York Herald Sunday page, and this too featured Reg'lar Fellers characters. With Reg'lar Fellers running as a daily strip in 1920, he changed the name of the Sunday strip to Reg'lar Fellers. Byrnes and his wife lived in New York with a summer home in Lake Champlain. During a 16-day trip west by automobile in 1922, they saw Carmel, California and decided to live there. They acquired the stone house then known as the Foster house, built in 1906, and remodeled it.

In 1923, he was interviewed by Helen Hilliard of The Oakland Tribune:

I sat and watched Gene Byrnes draw a cartoon of himself for me. And I marveled as I watched. How anybody could sit down off-hand, take up pencil and paper, and start right off on a picture. When I had asked him for a photograph, he had looked rather dubious. He had his doubts if he had any pictures of himself. “But,” he continued, “I can make that all right.” A soft drawing pencil appeared magically in his fingers, and deftly he began to trace various figures on a square of drawing paper. As I looked on the lines gradually began to take shape until I could see the faint resemblance to a man. The pencil suddenly disappeared and its place was taken by a pen. This he dipped in India ink and with big swift strokes blotted out the penciled lines with streaks of heavy black. A small paint brush put on the finishing touches. And lo and behold! there was the picture all finished, showing Gene Byrnes, cartoonist, with two Reg’lar Fellers on the top of his desk.

Gene Byrnes' Reg'lar Fellers and his topper strip Zoolie (July 1, 1945)

Byrnes, who was soon earning $25,000 a year, also did two topper strips—Daiseybelle and Zoolie. He overcame his limited drawing skills by hiring a phalanx of talented cartoonists to assist and ghost his strip, which continued to run in newspapers until 1948. Benjamin Thackston Knight (1895–1977), aka “Tack” Knight, was Byrnes' assistant on Reg’lar Fellers from 1924 to 1929.

== Books ==
Cupples & Leon published a Reg'lar Fellers collection in 1929. With syndication in 800 newspapers, plus book reprints and comic books, Byrnes' cartoon kids made him a wealthy man. Merchandising included Reg'lar Fellers baseball and football equipment.

Between 1939 and 1952, he wrote and edited several instructional books on cartooning and illustration. Ralph Bakshi learned how to draw cartoons after finding a copy of Byrnes' The Complete Guide to Cartooning in the early 1950s. Essandess published Byrnes' The How to Doodle Book in 1970.

== Death ==
In later years in New York, Byrnes lived at 570 Park Avenue. At the age of 84, he died at New York's Roosevelt Hospital of a heart ailment in 1974.

== Stonehouse Inn ==
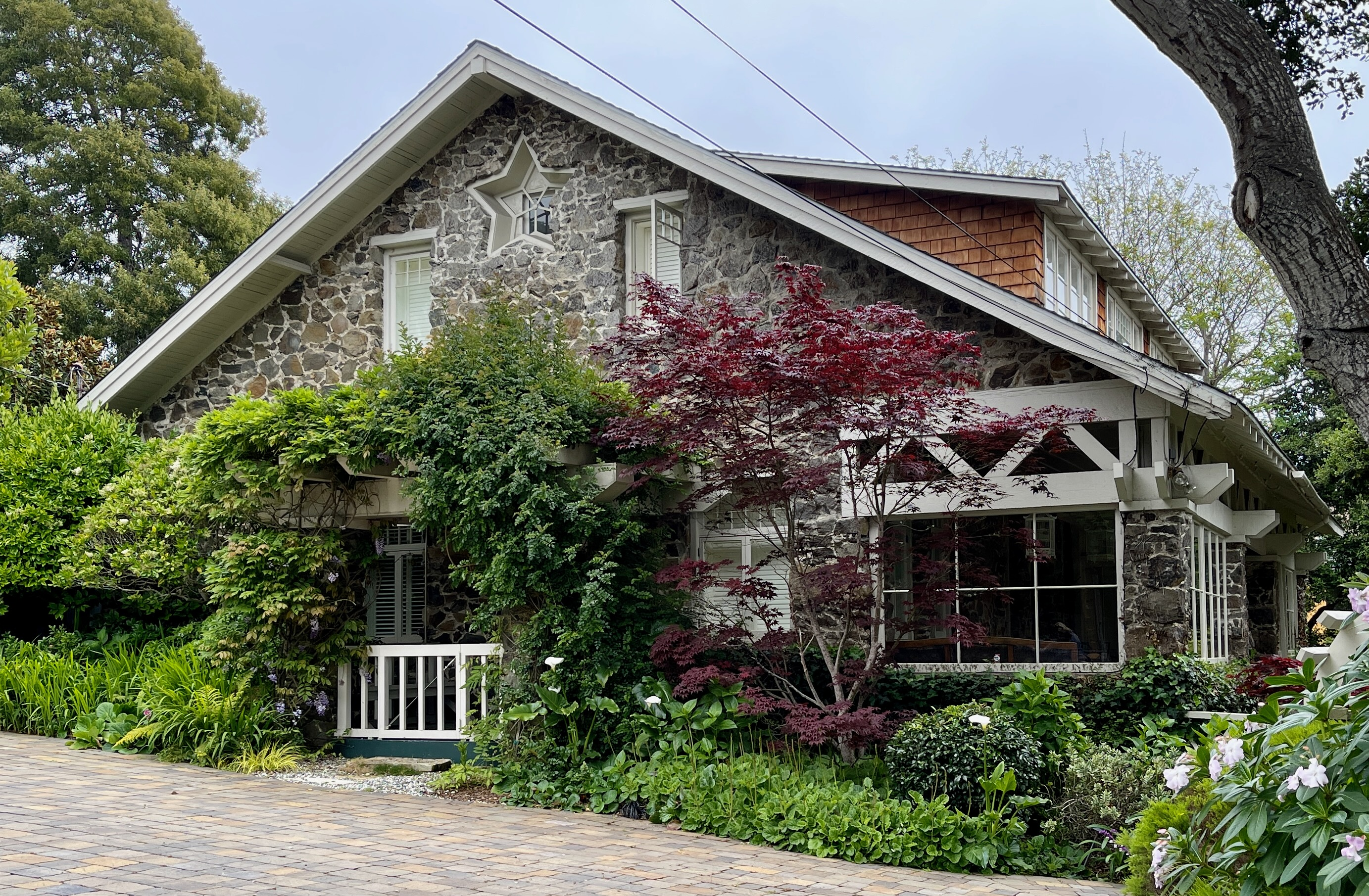
Stonehouse Inn in Carmel-by-the-Sea, California

Byrnes' stone house exists today as the historic Stonehouse Inn, built in 1906, with its ocean view, glass-enclosed porch, seven guest rooms, stone fireplace and hidden vault. It is located in Carmel at Eighth Avenue and Monte Verde Street.

== Sources ==
- Strickler, Dave. Syndicated Comic Strips and Artists, 1924-1995: The Complete Index. Cambria, California: Comics Access, 1995. ISBN 0-9700077-0-1
